= 2026 Houston Astros season =

65th season in Major League Baseball for the Houston Astros

2026 Houston Astros
- American League West champions
- League: American League
- Division: West
- Ballpark: Daikin Park
- City: Houston, Texas
- Record: 81–81 (.500)
- Divisional place: 1st
- Owners: Jim Crane
- President of baseball operations: Jim Crane (Note: Self-declared as a transitional role starting August 24, 2026)
- General manager: Dana Brown (Note: Through August 23, 2026); Charles Cook, Gavin Dickey Connor Huff, Jeff Bagwell (Note: Interim cohort starting August 24, 2026)
- Manager: Joe Espada
- Television: Space City Home Network (Todd Kalas, Kevin Eschenfelder, Geoff Blum, Jeff Bagwell, Julia Morales)
- Radio: KTRH 740 Weekday Night Games Sportstalk 790; Houston Astros Radio Network (Robert Ford, Steve Sparks, Geoff Blum, Michael Coffin); KLAT (Spanish) (Francisco Romero, Alex Treviño)
- Stats: ESPN.com; Baseball Reference

The 2026 Houston Astros season was the 65th season for the Major League Baseball (MLB) franchise located in Houston, Texas, their 62nd as the Astros, 14th in both the American League (AL) and AL West division, and 27th at Daikin Park. The Astros entered the season with an 87–75 record as runners-up in the AL West, three games behind the division-champion Seattle Mariners and having missed the playoffs for the first time since 2016.

Former outfielder Carlos Beltrán and second baseman Jeff Kent, integral pieces to Houston's first-ever National League (NL) Wild Card title in 2004, were elected to the Baseball Hall of Fame. Houston was one of four host cities for the 2026 World Baseball Classic (WBC) tournament, including Pool B and two quarterfinals games taking place at Daikin Park. On March 26, right-hander Hunter Brown made his first career Opening Day start for the Astros, who hosted the Los Angeles Angels, but were shut out 3-0.

On May 25, Tatsuya Imai, Steven Okert, and Alimber Santa—making his major league debut—combined for the 18th no-hitter in franchise history, a 9–0 triumph over the Texas Rangers. Yordan Alvarez received his fourth career selection to the MLB All-Star Game. On August 24, the team removed general manager Dana Brown from his position. On September 4, Josh Hader became the 41st reliever to attain 250 career saves, and, five days later, Jose Altuve registered his 2,500th career hit, the 103rd player to do so.

On the final day of the regular season, the Astros clinched their eighth AL West division title—each since 2017—to return to the playoffs for the tenth time out of 12 campaigns (2015, and 2017 to 2024). Their 15th division title overall, it was Houston's 19th playoff appearance. However, the 81 victories represented the fewest by a division title winner over a non-shortened season, (Note: Since the establishment of divisional play in 1969, four prior seasons had games cancelled league-wide: 1972, 1981, 1994, and 2020.) which surpassed a record by the 2005 San Diego Padres (82–80). The Astros' season ended on a two-game sweep by the Chicago White Sox in the American League Wild Card Series.

Yordan Alvarez, who led the major leagues in batting average (.316), on-base percentage (.432), and slugging percentage (.601), was unanimously selected for the AL Most Valuable Player (MVP) Award. He also ranked second in the AL in home runs (42) and runs batted in (106 RBI), and became the 26th major leaguer to bat .300, score 100 runs, hit 30 doubles, 40 home runs, 100 RBI, and draw 100 walks in the same season. Other awards conferred to Alvarez included the Hank Aaron, Edgar Martinez Outstanding Designated Hitter and Silver Slugger. Meanwhile, first baseman Christian Walker won his fourth career Gold Glove.

== Offseason ==
=== Summary ===
The Astros concluded the 2025 season with an 87–75 (.537) record, narrowly missing the playoffs, to break franchise-record strings of both four successive AL West division championships and eight consecutive seasons qualifying for the playoffs, excluded the first time since 2016. This marked the first time since 2020 that they had not won the division. Houston finished second in the AL West, three games behind the division-champion Seattle Mariners. The Astros tied with the Detroit Tigers with identical 87–75 records for the third and final Wild Card position. However, since Detroit won the season series, they retained the tiebreaker to qualify for the postseason.

Right-hander Hunter Brown authored a breakout performance in 2025, including ranking third in the major leagues with a 2.43 earned run average (ERA). Brown received his first selection to the All-MLB Team, on the Second Team. By virtue of finishing within the top three voting for the Cy Young Award, and Brown's former top-100 prospect status, the Astros received a prospect promotion incentive pick in the 2026 MLB draft.

The Astros made several personnel changes, including dismissing assistant general manager Andrew Ball, head athletic trainer Jeremiah Randall, hitting coaches Alex Cintrón and Troy Snitker, and catching coach Michael Collins.

Two former Astros became Hall of Fame inductees. Second baseman Jeff Kent, who appeared in the 2003 and 2004 seasons for the Astros, was announced as an inductee into the Baseball Hall of Fame, selected through the Contemporary Baseball Era committee. During Kent's latter stage with Houston, the club won their first-ever playoff series, the National League Division Series (NLDS), to advance to their third National League Championship Series (NLCS). During that playoff run, Kent batted .234/.333/.532 with three home runs and 10 runs batted in (RBI) in 10 games. Also on the 2004 squad was Carlos Beltrán, an electee to the Hall of Fame via balloting from the Baseball Writers' Association of America (BBWAA). Acquired prior to that year's All-Star break in a three-team trade with the Kansas City Royals, Beltrán tied Barry Bonds' playoff record for home runs with eight. Beltrán departed for the New York Mets via free agency that off-season. He returned in 2017 to become a member of Houston's first-ever World Series championship team. Hence, Beltrán became Houston's first-ever Hall-of-Famer as a member both the NL- and AL-era clubs.

The 2026 World Baseball Classic was staged on four sites: in Tokyo, Miami, San Juan, Puerto Rico, and Houston. In Houston, Daikin Park hosted all 10 Pool B games from March 6 to 11 and the quarterfinals.

=== Transactions ===
Free agents

Major League free agents

Following 2025 World Series
Víctor Caratini (C)	Astros electing free agency November 2, 2025 Contracts expired after World Series	Signed with Minnesota Twins January 16, 2026 2 years, $14 million
Craig Kimbrel (RP)	Astros electing free agency November 2, 2025 Contracts expired after World Series	Signed with New York Mets January 14, 2026 1 year, $2.5 million (minors)
Brendan Rodgers (2B)	Astros electing free agency November 2, 2025 Contracts expired after World Series	Signed with Boston Red Sox February 5, 2026 1 year (minors)
Framber Valdez (SP)	Astros electing free agency November 2, 2025 Contracts expired after World Series	Signed with Detroit Tigers February 10, 2026 3 years, $115 million
Ramón Urías (IF)	Departed Houston Astros Arbitration phase non-tender	Signed with St. Louis Cardinals February 21, 2026 1 year, $2 million

International free agents

Ryan Weiss (RHP) (United States)	Departed Hanwha Eagles KBO League	Signed with Houston Astros December 11, 2025 1 year, $2.6 million
Tatsuya Imai (RHP) (Japan)	Departed Saitama Seibu Lions Nippon Professional Baseball	Signed with Houston Astros January 2, 2026 3 years, $54 million (Note: Includes player options following years 1 and 2.)

Minor league free agents

Minor league free agents
Player	Position	Date	Organization departed	Gaining organization	Ref.
Peter Lambert	Right-handed pitcher	November 3, 2025	Tokyo Yakult Swallows (Japan)	Houston Astros (Note: Triggered option clause in contract at end of Spring Training. Resigned with Houston on March 27.)	
Cavan Biggio	Utility player	February 15, 2026	Kansas City Royals	Houston Astros	
Christian Vázquez	Catcher	March 7, 2026	Minnesota Twins	Houston Astros	
Luis García	Right-handed pitcher	March 27, 2026	Houston Astros	New York Yankees	

Trades

November 19, 2025	To Atlanta Braves Mauricio Dubón (UT)	To Houston Astros Nick Allen (IF)
December 18, 2025	To Tampa Bay Rays Jacob Melton (OF)—from Houston; Anderson Brito (RHP)—from Houston	To Pittsburgh Pirates Brandon Lowe (2B)—from Tampa Bay Jake Mangum (OF)—from Tampa Bay Mason Montgomery (LHP)—from Tampa Bay
December 18, 2025	To Houston Astros Mike Burrows (RHP)—from Pittsburgh
January 29, 2026	To San Francisco Giants Jancel Villarroel (C)	To Houston Astros Kai-Wei Teng (RHP)
February 13, 2026	To Toronto Blue Jays Jesús Sánchez (OF)	To Houston Astros Joey Loperfido (OF)

Rule 5 draft

Player	Position	Phase	Drafted from	Drafted by	Ref.
Roddery Muñoz	Right-handed pitcher	Major League	Cincinnati Reds	Houston Astros	
Edwin Sánchez	Right fielder	AAA	Los Angeles Dodgers	Houston Astros	
Abel Mercedes	Right-handed pitcher	AAA	Houston Astros	Athletics	

Coaching staff

Departing personnel	Coaching title	Arriving personnel	Ref.
Alex Cintrón	Hitting	Vic Rodriguez	
Troy Snitker	Assistant hitting	Anthony Iapoce	
Bill Murphy	Assistant pitching / bullpen (Note: Duties and title modified in conjunction with this personnel change.)	Ethan Katz	
Michael Collins	Catching	Tim Cossins	

== Spring training ==
The Astros commenced spring training on February 21, 2026, and concluded on March 24 with an overall performance of 11–14 (.440). This record ranked Houston 11th of 15 clubs within the Grapefruit League. On March 3, the Astros hosted Team Venezuela, who were preparing for the World Baseball Classic (WBC). Managed by Astros' bench coach Omar López, Venezuela ultimately won the tournament, defeating the United States 3–2 in the WBC Final. On September 25, 2026, López and Astros bullpen catcher Javier Bracamonte were announced as inductees in the Venezuelan Baseball Hall of Fame and Museum as members of the WBC championship team.

Former Astros pitcher Ryan Pressly joined Space City Home Network (SCHN) as a pre- and post-game analyst for the Astros per an announcement on March 15, 2026.

Spring training non-roster invitees

Christian Vázquez with the Minnesota Twins in 2025.

Player	Position	2025 organization	Bio.
Jax Biggers	Infielder	Texas Rangers	
Cody Bolton	Right-handed pitcher	Cleveland Guardians	
Will Bush	Catcher	Houston Astros	
Sam Carlson	Right-handed pitcher	Los Angeles Dodgers	
Edwin Díaz	Infielder	Houston Astros	
John Garcia	Catcher	Houston Astros	
Garret Guillemette	Catcher	Houston Astros	
Walker Janek	Catcher	Houston Astros	
Michael Knorr	Right-handed pitcher	Houston Astros	
Peter Lambert	Right-handed pitcher	Tokyo Yakult Swallows	
Hudson Leach	Right-handed pitcher	Houston Astros	
Anthony Maldonado	Right-handed pitcher	Athletics	
Carlos Pérez	Catcher	Chicago Cubs	
Collin Price	Catcher	Houston Astros	
Christian Roa (Note: Selected to Opening Day roster)	Right-handed pitcher	Miami Marlins	
Alimber Santa	Right-handed pitcher	Houston Astros	
Lucas Spence	Outfielder	Houston Astros	
Kellen Strahm	Outfielder	Texas Rangers	
Taylor Trammell	Outfielder	Houston Astros	
Riley Unroe	Infielder	Houston Astros	
Logan VanWey	Right-handed pitcher	Houston Astros	
Christian Vázquez	Catcher	Minnesota Twins	
Amos Willingham	Right-handed pitcher	Atlanta Braves	

=== World Baseball Classic ===
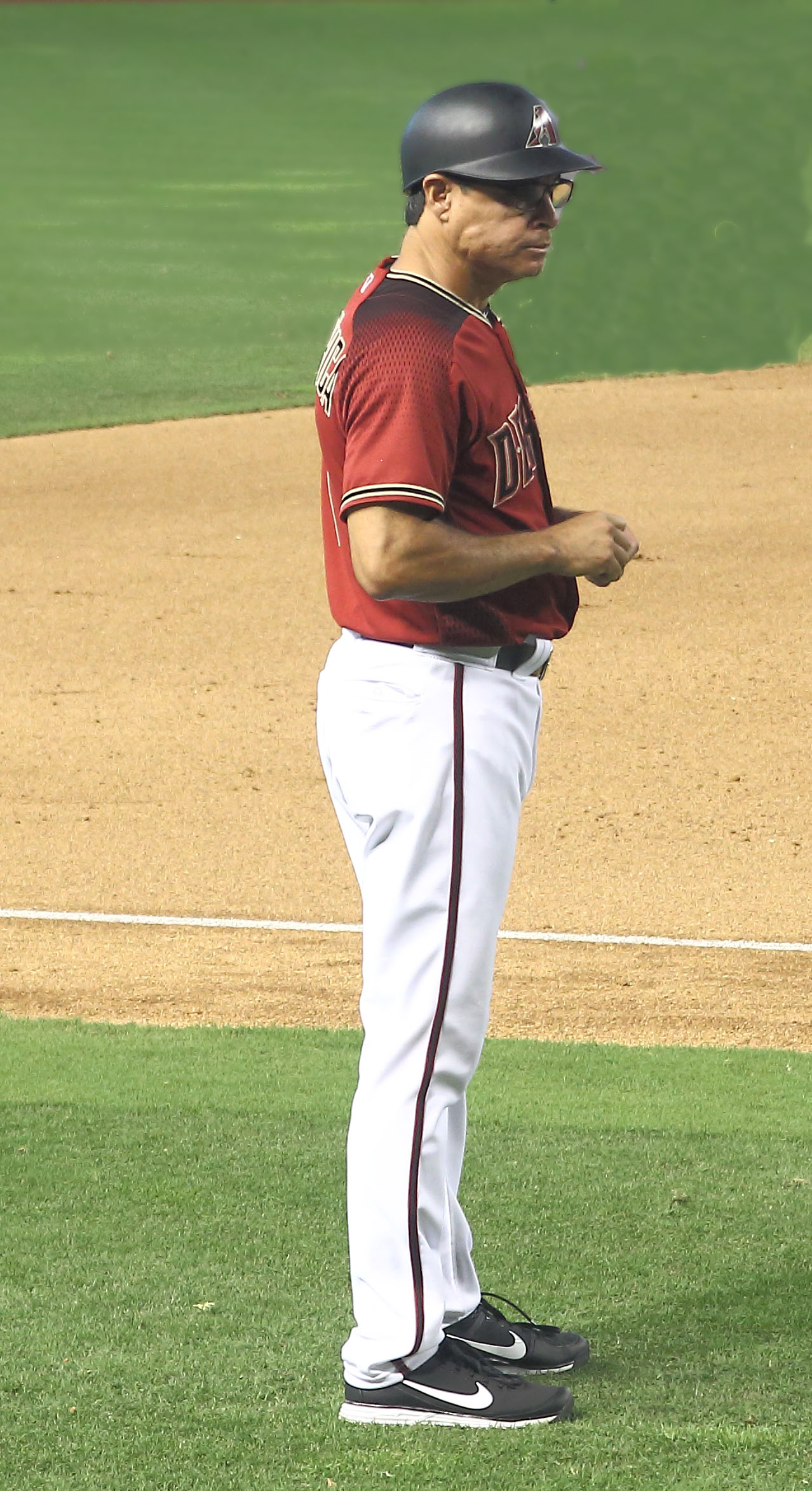
Tony Perezchica

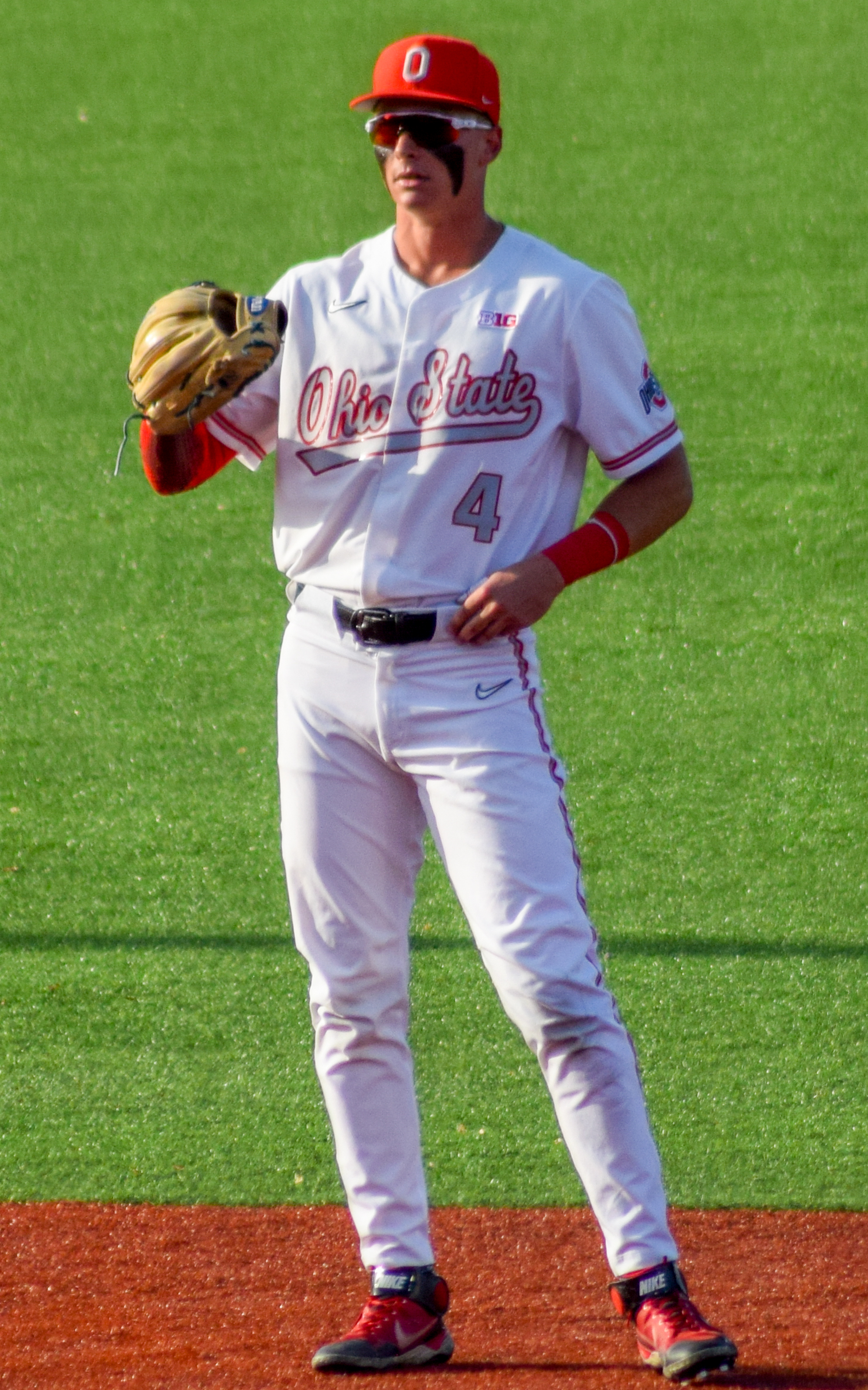
Zach Dezenzo

Houston Astros in the 2026 WBC
Individual	Role	National team	Stats
Josh Hendrickson	Pitcher	Australia	
Jeremy Peña (Note: Opted not to participate due to injury.)	Shortstop	Dominican Republic (bronze)	—
René Rojas	Coach	Dominican Republic (bronze)	—
Jason Bell	Coach	Israel	
Zach Dezenzo	Right fielder	Italy	
Tony Perezchica	Coach	Mexico	—
Shay Whitcomb	Shortstop	South Korea	
Javier Bracamonte	Coach	Venezuela (gold)	—
Omar López	Manager	Venezuela (gold)	—

Friendly	March 3	Venezuela	1–3	Houston Astros	Cacti Park of the Palm Beaches, West Palm Beach, Florida
Friendly	18:07 EST	LP: Amilcar Chirinos (0–1); HR: None	Boxscore	WP: Sam Carlson (1–0); HR: Carlos Pérez (1)	Attendance: 4,000; Umpires: HP – Edwin Moscoso; 1B – Carlos Torres; 2B – Emil Jiménez; 3B – Lance Barksdale

In addition to López, Astros bullpen catcher Javier Bracamonte, who assumed the same role for Team Venezuela, was also a World Baseball Classic champion.

== Regular season ==
=== Summary ===
==== March—April ====
The 2026 season in MLB began on March 25, with one game between the New York Yankees and San Francisco Giants, denominated as "Opening Night." Meanwhile, the Astros, along with most MLB teams, commenced their season the following day, the earliest for the traditional slate of Opening Day in league history. Also, the Automated Ball-Strike System (ABS) was implemented for major league game play for the first time in 2026.

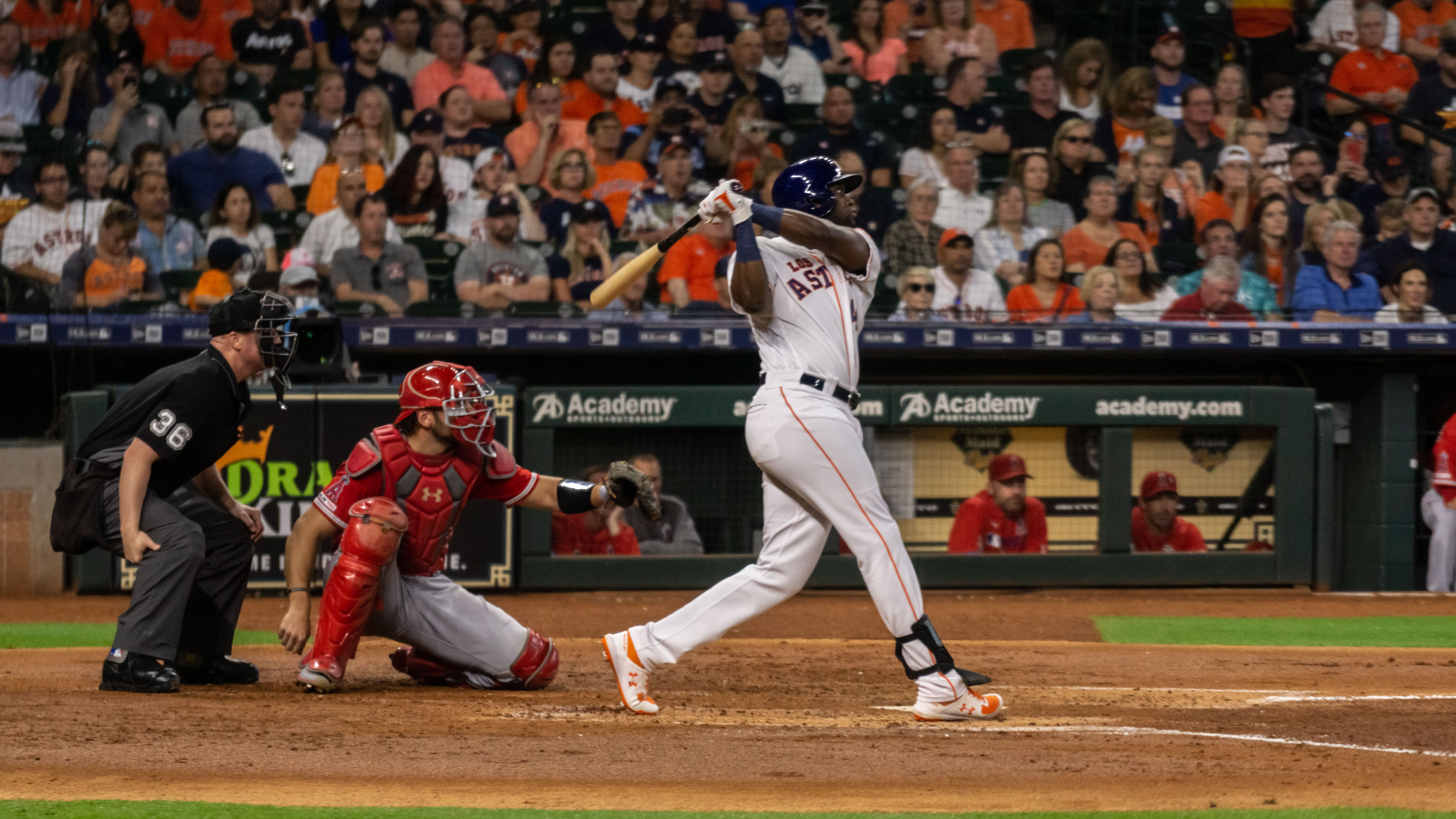
Yordan Alvarez (center), with catcher Kevan Smith and umpire Ryan Blakney, received his fourth All-Star selection in 2026.

Opening Day starting lineup
Uniform	Player	Position
27	Jose Altuve	Second baseman
44	Yordan Alvarez	Designated hitter
15	Isaac Paredes	Third baseman
1	Carlos Correa	Shortstop
10	Joey Loperfido	Left fielder
11	Cam Smith	Right fielder
8	Christian Walker	First baseman
21	Yainer Díaz	Catcher
6	Jake Meyers	Center fielder
58	Hunter Brown	Pitcher
Venue: Daikin Park • Los Angeles (AL) 3, Houston 0 Sources:

On Opening Day, March 26, 2026, the Los Angeles Angels tossed a combined shutout of the Astros, 3–0. Right-hander Hunter Brown made his first career Opening Day start for Houston and tossed 4 2/3 shutout innings with 9 strikeouts but was outlasted by José Soriano with seven shutout innings. Mike Trout homered, stole a base and coaxed three base on balls to lead Los Angeles to victory. The Astros got their first victory of the season on March 28, defeating the Angels, 11–9. Aided by wildness and errors, the Astros overcame a 6–0 deficit, exploding for three runs in the fifth inning and eight in the sixth. Eight of the starting nine in the batting order collected a hit and run scored each. First baseman Christian Walker scored his 500th career run.

On March 27 and March 29, two Astros hurlers with substantial experience in professional baseball in Asia made their major league debuts, Ryan Weiss, (Chinese Professional Baseball League and KBO League)) and Tatsuya Imai (Nippon Professional Baseball, NPB), respectively. On March 30, Lance McCullers Jr. led an 8–1 win over the Boston Red Sox, while Jose Altuve connected for four hits and two home runs. McCullers went seven innings or more, with one run or fewer for the first time since July 16, 2021. McCullers whiffed nine. (Note: Lance McCullers Jr., for single games, since 2015, in the regular season, requiring innings pitched ≥ 7 and runs allowed ≤ 1, sorted by ascending date.) This was Altuve's 42nd four-hit game, and third as a multi-homer bout, his first of this type since September 4, 2023.

Tatsuya Imai (1–0) obtained his first major league victory on April 4, backed by a record-setting batting performance at Sutter Health Park. The Astros shut out the Athletics, 11–0, with 18 hits and 13 walks. The 13 walks tied for second most in a nine-inning contest in club history, (Note: The most in nine innings for the Astros since April 29, 2000, versus Milwaukee. Criteria: For single games, from 1962 to 2026, for HOU, in the regular season, sorted by descending bases on balls.) while they set the club record for a nine-inning game with 17 runners left on base (LOB). (Note: Surpassed 16 runners LOB on May 4, 2017, versus Texas. Criteria: For single games, from 1962 to 2026, for HOU, in the regular season, sorted by descending runners left on base.) Moreover, the Astros were two hits short of producing just the second bout in club history of aggregating at least 20 hits and 10 walks. (Note: Accomplished in extra innings on July 11, 1970. Criteria: For single games, from 1962 to 2026, in the regular season, requiring bases on balls ≥ 10 and hits ≥ 20, sorted by ascending date.) Yordan Alvarez drew four of the walks—reaching base five times—Jeremy Peña and Christian Vázquez each doubled twice, while Christian Walker doubled and homered. Imai allowed three hits over 5 2/3 innings and struck out nine. This was the second time in Alvarez' career that he drew four walks in a game, with first occurring on August 20, 2019.

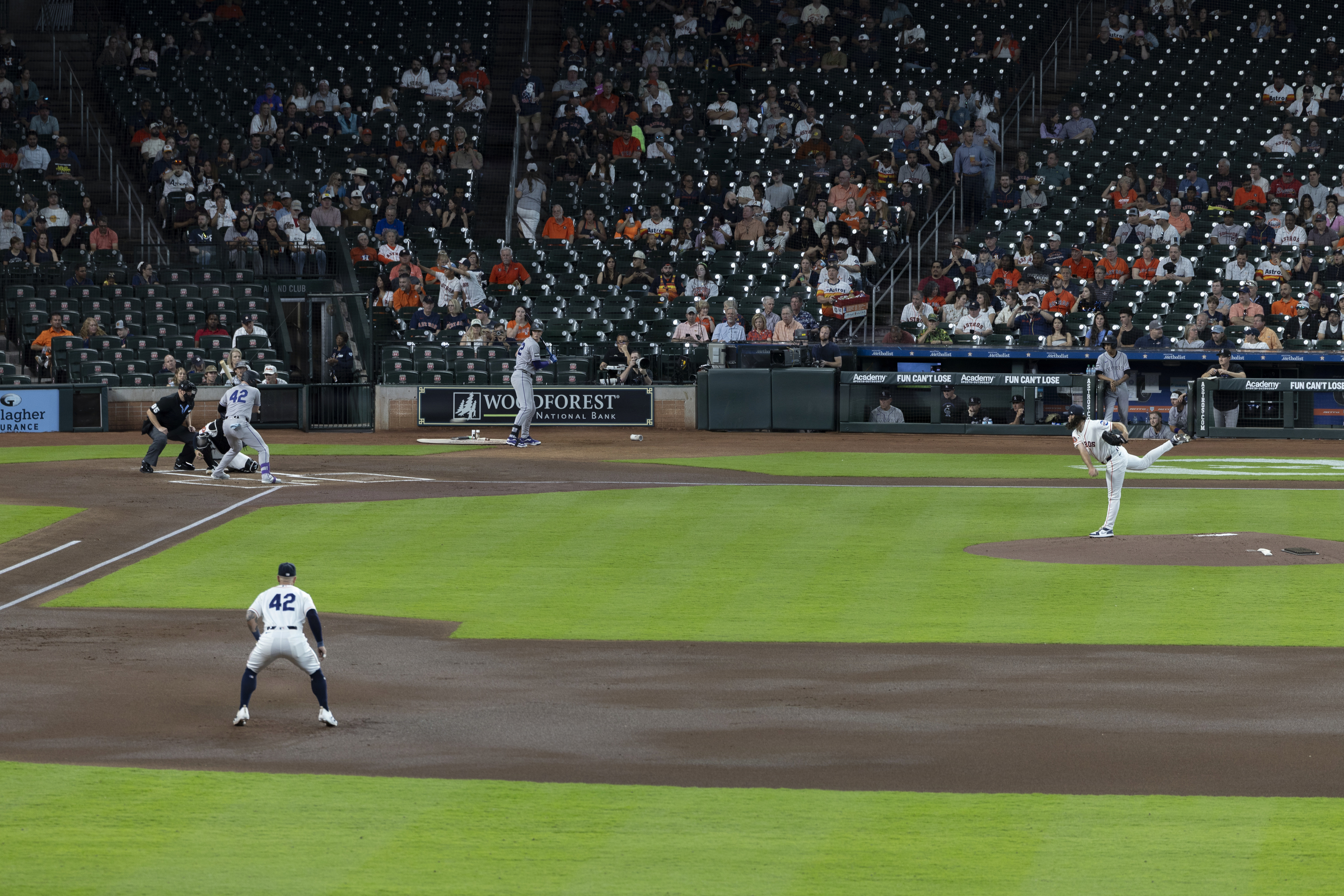
The Astros, during an April game against the Colorado Rockies at Daikin Park

Yordan Alvarez slugged his 174th career home run on April 5, which tied former teammate George Springer for seventh all-time in club history. (Note: For combined seasons, playing for HOU, in the regular season, requiring home runs ≥ 150, sorted by descending home runs.) During the week ended April 5, Alvarez batted .471 / .615 on-base percentage (OBP) / 1.118 slugging percentage (SLG) / over six games and was recognized as AL Player of the Week, his fourth career award, and first by an Astro since both himself and Alex Bregman on August 11, 2024. On April 6, Altuve attained his 2,400th career hit, a first-inning double versus the Colorado Rockies.

From April 14 to 28, Alvarez authored a 13-game hitting streak during which he hit .389, .759 slugging percentage, five home runs, and 12 RBI. This would be the team's longest hitting streak of the season until Jeremy Peña hit safely in a 14th consecutive game on August 2. (Note: Longest streak of consecutive games, in 2026, playing for HOU, in the regular season, requiring Hits ≥ 1, sorted by most games matching criteria.)

Jose Altuve played his 2,000th career game on April 21 at Progressive Field during a series against the Cleveland Guardians. He became the fifth active major leaguer to appear in as many games, and third Astro all-time, joining Hall of Famers Craig Biggio (2.850) and Jeff Bagwell (2,150). (Note: The other active major leaguers included Andrew McCutchen, Carlos Santana, Freddie Freeman and Paul Goldschmidt.)

From April 30 to May 15, Braden Shewmake logged a 10-game hitting streak during which he hit. 389 with two home runs and six RBI.

The Astros' pitching staff was riddled with injuries in the early part of the season. On April 29, the team was in last place in the AL West with a record of 11-19 and an MLB-lowest team earned run average of 5.96.

Over 32 games during March and April, Yordan Alvarez batted .356 / .462 OBP / .737 SLG, with 12 home runs, 27 runs batted in (RBI), 87 total bases, 21 bases on balls and 14 strikeouts. He won AL Player of the Month honors, his third career monthly award. Alvarez joined Jeff Bagwell (five wins) and former teammate Alex Bregman (three) as Astros named the Player of the Month three or more times, and was also Houston's most recent winner in September 2023.

==== May ====
On May 5, Peter Lambert (2–2) led a 2–1 victory over the Los Angeles Dodgers, outdueling Shohei Ohtani (2–2). Lambert tossed seven shutout innings and obtained a game score of 72. Bryan King tossed the final two innings for his third save. Christian Walker (9) and Braden Shewmake (2) went deep for Houston.

On May 14, longtime Astros Jose Altuve and Lance McCullers Jr. each attained a 900 milestone on the way to highlighting a 4–3, extra innings, walk-off victory over the Seattle Mariners. Altuve became the fifth Astro to reach 900 RBI. McCullers struck out Josh Naylor for the 900th of his career. His 154th career appearance, it was the fewest to reach 900 in terms of total career appearances. Zach Cole singled to score Brice Matthews for the walk-off victory in the bottom of the tenth.

During the inaugural game of the season's Lone Star Series on May 15, Spencer Arrighetti and Bryan King combined for a one-hit shutout of the Texas Rangers to lead a 2–0 triumph. Arrighetti (5–1) took a no-hit bid into the top of the eighth until Justin Foscue lined a single down the left field line with one out. King relieved Arrighetti and retired the final five Rangers batters for the save (4). Isaac Paredes (4) homered off Rangers starter Jack Leiter (1–4).

Beginning May 22, until June 19, Yordan Alvarez reached base in 25 consecutive games, during which he hit .366 /.459 .699 slugging percentage, 9 home runs, and 24 RBI. This was tied for eighth-longest on-base streak in the major leagues this season. (Note: Longest streak of consecutive games, in 2026, in the regular season, requiring Times On Base ≥ 1, sorted by most games matching criteria.)

==== Imai—Okert—Santa combined no-hitter ====
On May 25, three Astros pitchers—two of whom were rookies—combined to no-hit their in-state rivals, the Texas Rangers: starter Tatsuya Imai, Steven Okert, and Alimber Santa, making his major league debut. The 18th no-hitter in club history, it was Houston's fifth combined effort. Imai issued walks to the first two Rangers hitters, then induced a ground ball double play. Imai proceeded to permit just two more baserunners as he tossed six innings. Okert took over for the seventh inning, and Santa polished off the masterpiece by closing out the final two innings. Santa retired his first batter faced, Andrew McCutchen, on a ground ball to third baseman Braden Shewmake. During the bottom of the ninth, Santa struck out Brandon Nimmo looking for the final out of the contest and his first major league strikeout.

Yordan Alvarez and Christian Walker connected for home runs to lead Houston's offense. Walker tied a club record by connecting for each of at least one home run and three RBI over three successive contests, joining César Cedeño (1976), Moisés Alou (1998), and Lance Berkman (2006). Nick Allen and Christian Vázquez both had two hits. Astros' defense provided crucial plays to keep history intact. During the bottom of the third, Jeremy Peña snared Joc Pederson's rocket ground ball to his right, pivoted and threw out Pederseon. Jake Meyers made two long running catches to the deep left-center field gap during the fifth inning, one swatted by Justin Foscue and one by Danny Jansen. Vázquez had caught the Astros' most recent combined no-hitter, during Game 4 of the World Series, by Cristian Javier, Bryan Abreu, Rafael Montero, and Ryan Pressly against the Philadelphia Phillies.

This was the first no-hitter pitched in the Lone Star Series. Ronel Blanco had tossed Houston's most recent no-hitter, on April 1, 2024 against the Toronto Blue Jays. It was the first in the major leagues since the Chicago Cubs' Shota Imanaga, Nate Pearson and Porter Hodge no-hit the Pirates on September 4, 2024. The no-hitter was the second of Imai's career, as he had worked eight innings of a combined effort as a member of the Saitama Seibu Lions on April 18, 2025. (Note: Unlike MLB, Nippon Professional Baseball officially recognizes only no-hitters and perfect games thrown by a single pitcher.) Per the Elias Sports Bureau, since 1900, Santa was the only hurler to contribute to a no-hit win in his major league debut. Prior to Santa, on October 15, 1892, Bumpus Jones threw a complete game no-hit victory for the Cincinnati Reds, the only other known instance in which a pitcher tossed a no-hitter during his major league debut.

Notably, the day prior, on May 24, the Astros had defeated Imanaga and the Cubs, 8–5, with Pearson getting the save against his former team.

==== Rest of May ====
On May 31, Isaac Paredes doubled during the fourth inning to obtain the 500th hit of career, off Jacob Misiorowski (6–2). It was the first extra-base hit against the right-hander since April 19, a span of sever starts. Misiorowski fanned eight Astros over seven innings to lead a 2–0, three-hit combined shutout victory for the Milwaukee Brewers. Paredes became the 10th Mexican-born to player to reach the hit milestone, two of whiom had played for Houston: Alex Treviño (the Astros' Spanish-language broadcaster) and Vinny Castilla.

During May, Spencer Arrighetti worked to a 4–1 win–loss record (W–L). 0.93 earned run average (ERA), over five starts and 29 innings pitched (IP). He struck out 22 and surrendered 17 walks, a 1.138 walks plus hits per inning pitched (WHIP), two extra-base hits, .165 batting average against, and .517 OPS. He was recognized as American League (AL) Pitcher of the Month for the first time. Arrighetti, who previously won AL Rookie of the Month in August 2024, joined Roy Oswalt (August 2001, August 2002, and September 2006 as Astros pitchers who have won both monthly awards.

==== June ====
The Astros won on a rally when trailing after seven innings on June 3—their first such triumph on the season—interrupting a 32-game losing streak during those indicated situations for an 11–9 final over the Pittsburgh Pirates. Cam Smith's two-run triple capped a six-run eighth inning, and, Josh Hader collected the save in his season debut after returning from arm injury. During the bottom of the seventh, Paredes slugged a two-run home run to close Pittsburgh's lead to 8–5.

On June 4, Isaac Paredes connected for the 100th home run of his career off Carmen Mlodzinski of the Pittsburgh Pirates. Catcher Collin Price made his major league debut. Price drew a base on balls from starter Jared Jones for his major league plate appearance during the bottom of the second inning. Price went 0-for-3.

Yordan Alvarez launched his fifth career grand slam on June 6, versus Kade Morris of the Athletics during the second inning, to ignite a 13–2 Astros win. LaMonte Wade Jr. added three hits, three RBI, and attained both or his first home run and double for the season. The Astros assembled seven extra-base hits: Jose Altuve also homered, and Christian Walker, Christian Vázquez, Isaac Paredes, and Jeremy Peña all doubled. Alvarez became the 11th Astro to hit five grand slams, with former teammate Kyle Tucker being the most recent.

On June 12, Alvarez connected for two home runs—including a grand slam—and six RBI during the first inning at Kauffman Stadium to lead a 10–8 triumph over the Kansas City Royals. Nine of Houston's runs arrived in the first inning as Christian Walker also went deep. Neither starter (Luinder Avila and Tatsuya Imai) recorded more than two outs, however, as Kansas City answered with five tallies during the bottom of the first. Alvarez became the 24th major leaguer to accrue six or more RBI during a single inning, succeeding Cody Bellinger of the Los Angeles Dodgers on June 2, 2021. Alvarez' two home runs in one inning tied the major league record, becoming the 66th player, succeeding Riley Greene of the Detroit Tigers on May 2, 2025, and third Astros hitter. (Note: Following Lee May on April 29, 1974, and Jeff Bagwell on June 24, 1994.)

On June 23, Astros hitters connected for three consecutive home runs for the eighth time in club history, by Yainer Díaz, Cam Smith, and Taylor Trammell, off Shane Bieber during the fourth inning at the Rogers Centre. (Note: The most recent instance of the Astros hitting three successive home run was on July 19, 2019, by Altuve, Bregman, and Alvarez, versus Texas.) The Astros won in the top of the eleventh inning when Joey Loperfido hit a three-run home that put Houston ahead, 9–6. They held on to defeat the Toronto Blue Jays, 9–7.

On June 30, Alvarez connected for his third grand slam of the month, tying a major league record as the 11th hitter, last accomplished by former teammate Alex Bregman in June 2023. Alvarez took starter Joe Ryan deep during the bottom of the fourth inning, transferring the lead from the Minnesota Twins to the Astros, 6–3, resulting as the game-winning hit. Alvarez' seventh career grand slam, he also tied the regular-season club record held jointly by Carlos Lee, Altuve, and Bregman.

==== July, pre-All-Star break ====
On July 4, Yordan Alvarez blasted his second career regular season walk-off home run, and first in exactly four seasons, leading a 10–8 comeback triumph over the Tampa Bay Rays. It was Alvarez' fourth career bout of two home and six RBI or greater, and second of the campaign. (Note: Previously on August 10, 2019; September 6, 2024; and June 12, 2026.) Six days later, on July 10 against Texas, Alvarez hit a home run off Cal Quantrill 455 feet (139 m) to right-center field, becoming the first player in the American League to hit 30, also the 200th of his career. This was the second-fewest (96 games) for a player to reach 30 home runs in a season in team history, trailing only Jeff Bagwell in 1999.

On July 11, LaMonte Wade Jr. hit his first career grand slam against Kumar Rocker at Globe Life Field, as the Astros toppled the Rangers, 9–3. Starter Peter Lambert (8–5) scattered three hits, one walk and one run over six innings to obtain the victory. Yordan Alvarez (31) and Christian Vázquez (5) also homered, and Alvarez doubled and reached base four times.

==== MLB All-Star Game ====
Yordan Alvarez received selection to the MLB All-Star Game for the fourth time in his career. He was the starting designated hitter, his second selection to the starting lineup. He became the seventh player to become an All-Star four times while playing for Houston, succeeding teammate Jose Altuve (2016) as the most recent. The bout was held at Citizens Bank Park in Philadelphia. Alvarez realized his first hit and first run as an All-Star, hitting a single and scoring on a Cody Bellinger double during the first inning, the first run of the game. The American League defeated the National League, 4–0.

==== July, post-All-Star break ====
The Astros were swept by the Baltimore Orioles at home following the All-Star break. Starting July 12, the first game post-All-Star break, Jeremy Peña had a 15-game hitting streak that lasted until August 3. Peña hit .422/.464./828, 27 hits, seven home runs and 15 RBI. This surpassed Yordan Alvarez' 13-game streak from April 14 to 28 as the team's longest of the season, and was the longest by an Astros hitter since Alex Bregman hit in 16 consecutive from May 28 to June 15, 2024. (Note: Longest streak of consecutive games, from 1962 2026, playing for HOU, in the regular season, requiring Hits ≥ 1, sorted by most games matching criteria.) Peña's tied for fifth-longest in the major leagues this season with Nick Gonzales, Freddie Freeman, Jake McCarthy, and Jordan Walker. (Note: Longest streak of consecutive games, in 2026, in the regular season, requiring Hits ≥ 1, sorted by most games matching criteria.)

On July 15, the Astros traded pitchers Lance McCullers Jr. and Colton Gordon and cash considerations to the Milwaukee Brewers for minor league designated hitter Jayden Fielder.

On July 20, right-hander Ronel Blanco returned to the mound 432 days following arm surgery, versus the Miami Marlins. In the second inning, Jeremy Peña hit an opposite-field grand slam to give the Astros the lead, one they would not relinquish. Alvarez slugged two home runs. The Astros won, 8–5.

Peña then homered in three of his next five games, to go with three successive three-hit games as the Astros won of five of six contests, while continuing an eight-game hitting streak. He hit .500 (13-for-26) with five home runs and eight RBI. Peña was the named AL Player of the Week for the first time in his career.

On July 28, the Astros scored four times in the top of the ninth inning to rally and claim a 6–4 triumph over the Los Angeles Angels, benefiting from miscues on just one hit. Another Tommy John surgery patient, Hayden Wesneski started and won his 2026 debut for Houston on July 29, leading a 7–4 win over the Los Angeles Angels. The Astros reached the .500 mark (55–55) for the first since April 7, their eighth win in nine games. This was the first time since May 6, 2025, that Wesneski had pitched in a major league game. On July 31, the Astros defeated the Rangers, 11–2, to simultaneously attain a winning record, win the Lone Star Series, while overtaking the Rangers for first lace in the AL West. Yainer Díaz delivered successive four-hit games on July 29 and 31, the first time in his career doing so, and first four-hit performance since July 30, 2024, while connecting for a home run in both games. Isaac Paredes (15) and Christian Walker (22) also homered on July 31, and Jeremy Peña collected three hits and three RBI. Meanwhile, Hunter Brown (3–1) logged 5 2/3 innings to earn the win. Díaz became the 16th batter in team history to record four hits each over consecutive games, succeeding Yordan Alvarez on September 3 and 4 of the previous year. (Note: Longest streak of consecutive games, playing for HOU, in the regular season, requiring Hits ≥ 4, sorted by most games matching criteria.)

From July 29 to August 11, Cam Smith batted .415/.452/.732 with three home runs, 8 RBI, and 11 runs scored over 11 games.

Yordan Alvarez hit .360/.467/.721/1.188 OPS, nine home runs, 22 RBI, 17 walks and 18 strikeouts in 23 games during the month of July. He was recognized as AL Player of the Month for the second time this season. Alvarez joined Jeff Bagwell in 1994 as both the second Astro to win the award more than once during the same season, and the second to win at least four times overall.

==== August ====
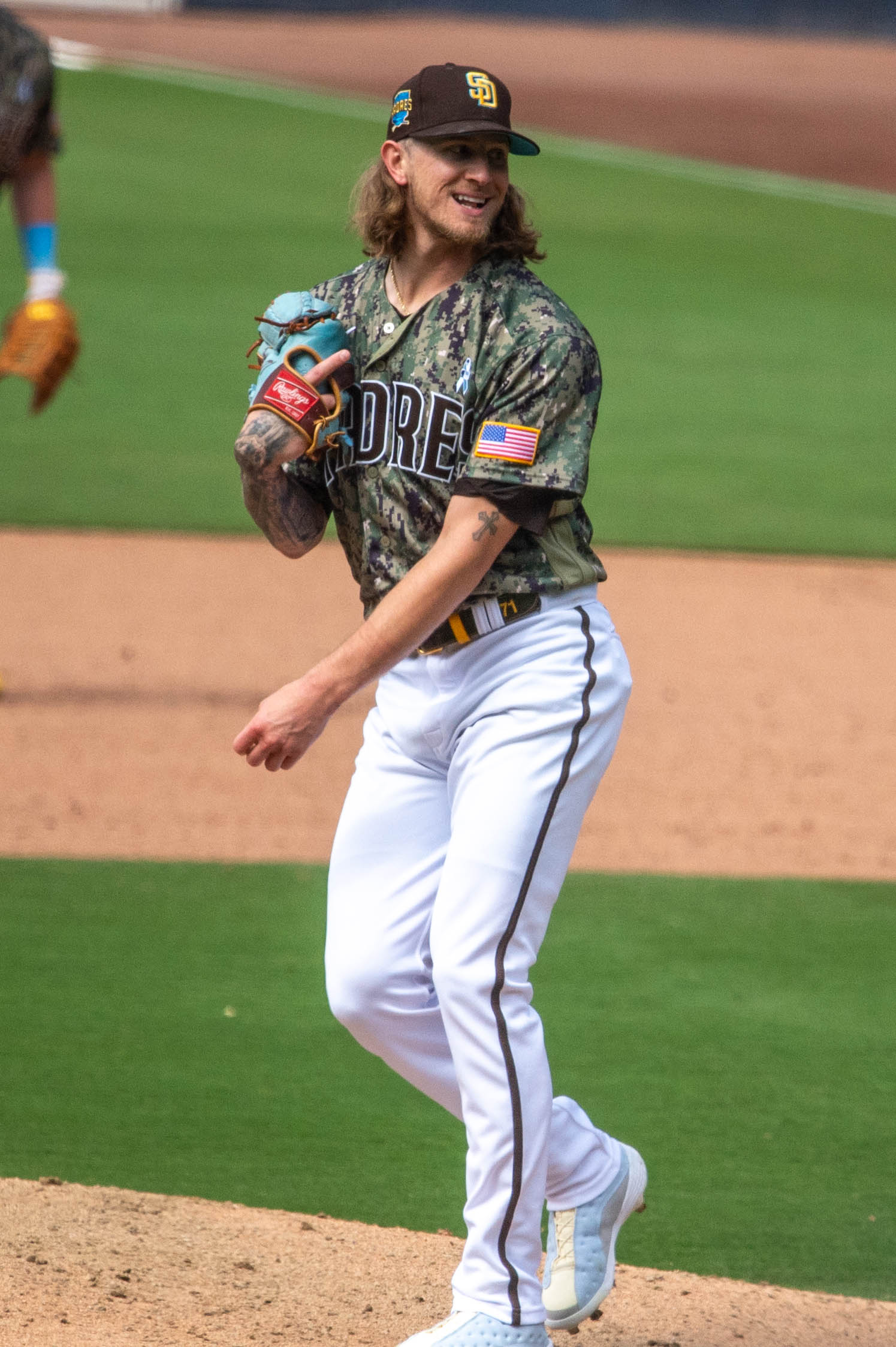
Josh Hader pitched a scoreless month of August.

The Astros won on August 1 versus Texas, 5–4, with Yainer Díaz hitting a RBI single the fourth inning for the go-ahead run. Taylor Trammell collected two RBI. Steven Okert (5–1) tossed 1 1/3 scoreless frames from the sixth to the seventh to earn the victory, and Bryan Abreu (7) and Josh Hader (15) each followed with one scoreless inning to earn the hold and save, respectively. On August 2, the Astros won the final game of the season series against Texas by a score of 7–3, concluding the Lone Star Series 9–4 (.692), and extended a winning streak to a season-high six games, their 11th win in 12. During the bottom of the seventh inning, Cam Smith singled home Taylor Trammell for the go-ahead run. LaMonte Wade Jr. followed with an RBI single, and Yordan Alvarez lined a two-run double. Bryan Abreu (3–3) struck out two of the three batters faced to earn the victory.

On August 3, Houston traded pitcher Spencer Arrighetti to the Toronto Blue Jays for center fielder Daulton Varsho, during a series in which the two clubs were facing each other at Daikin Park. The Astros dropped consecutive series versus the Blue Jays and San Diego Padres, both by losing two of three contests. In the finale of the Padres series, each of Houston's final 22 batters were retired in order in a 2–7 defeat. Houston's only two hits occurred consecutively, first by a Taylor Trammell single, followed by Varsho's first home run as a member of the Astros.

On August 14, Christian Walker belted the Astros' second walk-off home run of the season, and third of his career, off Seattle Mariners closer Andrés Muñoz. A three-run home run, it capped a dramatic five-run comeback during the bottom of the tenth inning which resulted in a 10–7 final. Isaac Paredes, who had two hits and three RBI, singled home Jeremy Peña earlier in the 10th inning, and Daulton Varsho singled home Nick Allen to tie the score, 7-all.

The Astros inducted catcher and broadcaster Alan Ashby and infielder and manager Phil Garner into their team Hall of Fame during a pre-game ceremony at Daikin Park on August 15, 2026.

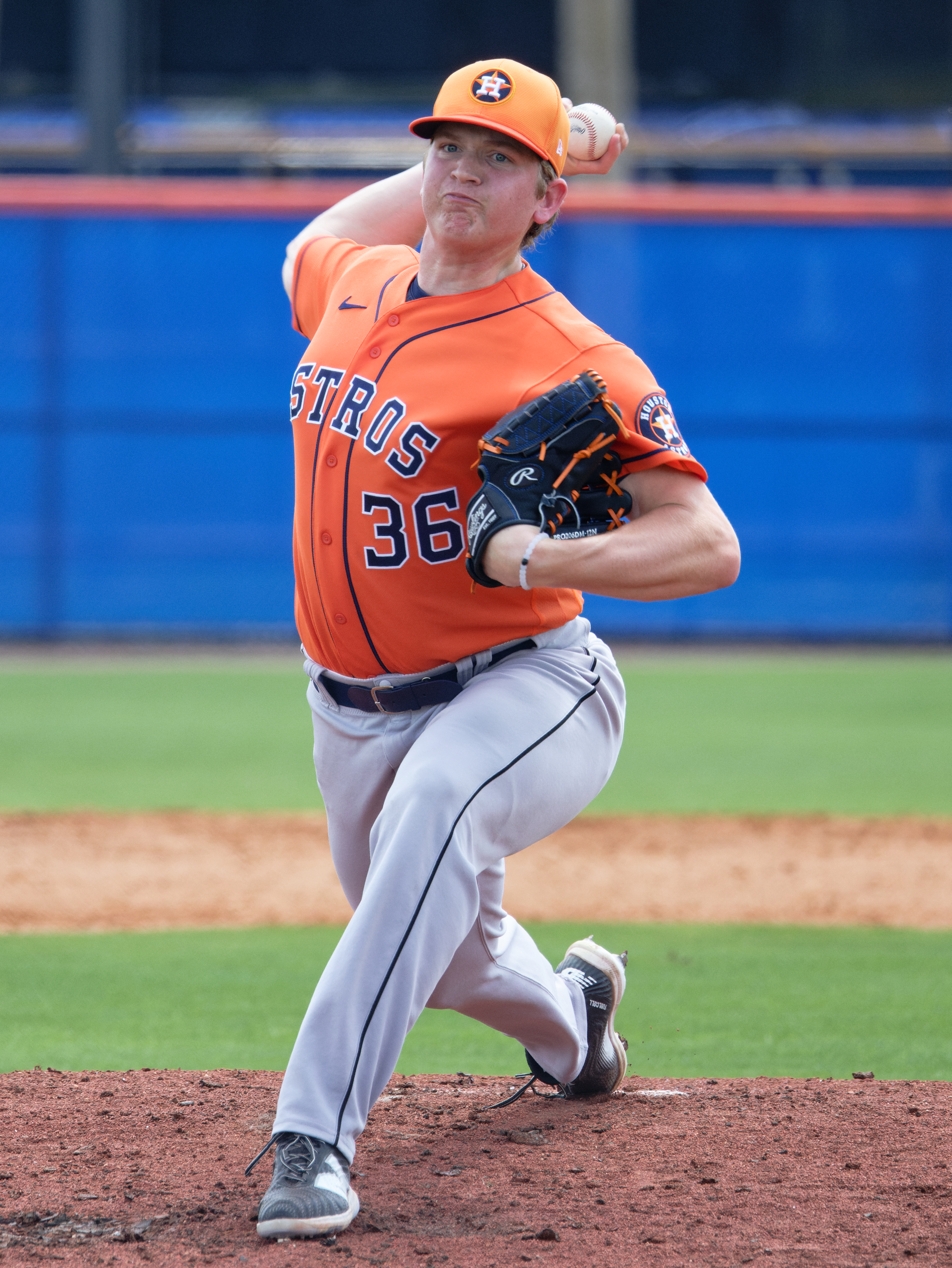
Ethan Pecko made his major league debut in 2026.

On August 19, right-hander Ethan Pecko made his MLB debut as the starting pitcher versus the Los Angeles Angels at Daikin Park. He worked 3 2/3 innings, yielding three hits and two runs, and fanned Vaughn Grissom for his first major league strikeout. Pecko's batterymate, Christian Vázquez, homered (7), as the Astros won, 3–2. Josh Hader, who earned his 18th save of 18 opportunities to open the season, logged the 500th appearance and 245th save of his career, passing Dan Quisenberry for 41st on the latter chart. Thus far on the season, Hader had surrendered a .123 batting average against and an 0.87 earned run average (ERA).

Christian Walker maintained an error-free campaign until August 21, through the first 121 games. This was the longest streak among major league infielders this season.

On August 24, after having lost 5 of their last 6 series, and going 3–6 on their most recent homestand, the Astros announced that they had terminated general manager (GM) Dana Brown. His duties would be divided between assistant GMs Charles Cook, Gavin Dickey and Connor Huff, and senior advisor Jeff Bagwell. Hired in advance of the 2023 season, Brown oversaw two playoff appearances, an AL West division title and a Wild Card berth. On August 27, former pitching coach Brent Strom rejoined the team as a pitching consultant. At the time, the starting rotation had the third-highest ERA in the major leagues (5.17}, while they had issued the second-most base on balls (550).

Southpaw closer Josh Hader remained unscored upon in August over 14 1/3 innings pitched (IP), converting each of seven save opportunities in 13 appearances. He surrendered four this and one walk for a 0.35 WHIP, sporting a 15.00 strikeout-to-walk ratio, and .085 opponents' batting average. He was selected as AL Reliever of the Month for the ninth time in his career, and third in one each of three consecutive seasons as a member of the Astros. Hader's most recent selection was for June of the previous year.

==== September ====
Jose Altuve awaits the pitch on the way to 2,500 career hits.

On September 4, Josh Hader attained his 250th career save by striking out the side in a 3–1 win versus the Arizona Diamondbacks. He became the 41st pitcher to achieve the milestone, and ranked sixth all-time among left-handers, two behind Dave Righetti. Hader's scoreless innings streak reached 19 innings, until, on September 8, (Note: Hader tossed the third-longest scoreless appearance streak (18) in the major leagues, and fourth-longest scoreless innings streak. Criteria: Longest streak of consecutive games, in 2026, As relief pitcher, in the regular season, within a single season, requiring runs allowed ≤ 0 and innings pitched ≥ 1, sorted by most games matching criteria.) the Philadelphia Phillies rallied to cut the Astros' lead to 6–5 in the bottom of the ninth inning. However, Hader persisted to limit the damage and record the save (24). On September 9, Jose Altuve lined a double in the right-center field gap off starter Cristopher Sánchez for hit number 2,500, joining Freddie Freeman as the second active player and 103rd major leaguer overall.

Josh Hader was announced on September 15 as the Astros' Roberto Clemente Award nominee for 2026, his second consecutive year to receive this nomination.

On September 17, Yordan Alvarez connected for his 40th home run, to become the fifth Astros batter to reach the milestone in a single season. (Note: Previously, Jeff Bagwell (thrice, 1997, 1999, and 2000), Richard Hidalgo (2000), Lance Berkman (twice, 2002 and 2006), and Alex Bregman (2019). Number of seasons player meets criteria, playing for HOU, in the regular season, requiring home runs ≥ 40, sorted by descending instances.) Alvarez connected off Kansas City Royals starter Seth Lugo. Jeremy Peña (20), Daulton Varsho (12), LaMonte Wade Jr. (4) and Taylor Trammell (8) also homered as Houston triumphed, 6–2.

On September 19, Jose Altuve recorded his 226th three-hit game (Note: Jose Altuve, for single games, playing for HOU, in the regular season, requiring hits ≥ 3, sorted by ascending date.) to surpass Craig Biggio for most in team history. (Note: Number of games in a career player meets criteria, playing for HOU, in the regular season, requiring hits ≥ 3, sorted by descending instances.) Following a September sweep by division leaders Tampa Bay Rays, and during another sweep by the Atlanta Braves on September 19, the Astros fell out of first place in the AL West for the first time since July 29.

On September 22, Christian Walker blasted the 200th home run of his career, off Logan Gilbert of the Seattle Mariners at T-Mobile Park. The following game, pitcher Josh Hendrickson made his major league debut in relief of Ethan Pecko, and struck out his first batter faced, J. P. Crawford. Hendrickson totaled two innings, yielding two hits and one run over two innings. However, the Mariners ambushed the Astros with a 6–5, walk-off victory in ten innings.

Lucas Spence, in his 16th major league game on September 24, hit his first three major league home runs at Sutter Health Park to lead a 7–5 win over the Athletics. Spence became the third major leaguer to do so, succeeding Seby Zavala of the Chicago White Sox (July 31, 2021) and Joshua Báez of the St. Louis Cardinals, on August 15, 2026. Spence became the 14th Astro to hit three home runs in a single game, following Yordan Alvarez on August 28, 2024, and second Astros rookie, also joining Alvarez (August 10, 2019). During the final road series at Sutter Health, Spence's performance was instrumental in the Astros winning 3 of 4 games to clinch the AL West division. Spence batted .400/.500/1.400/1.900, (Note: Listed combination of batting statistics including batting average (AVG), on-base percentage (OBP), slugging percentage (SLG), and on-base plus slugging percentage (OPS).) one double, one triple, four home runs, 9 RBI, three walks, and five runs scored. Christian Walker closed out the season on a six-game hitting streak, batting 348/.407/.913/1.320 with four home runs and 7 RBI. Yordan Alvarez likewise concluded the season on a 12-game hitting streak, batting .386/.491/.750/1.241, 4 home runs and 10 RBI. Yainer Diaz produced a month of September going 30-for-84, .357/.379/.583/.963, four home runs, 12 RBI, In the regular season finale, six Astros pitchers combined to shut out the A's in West Sacramento, 9–0. Ethan Pecko (2–0) earned his second major league victory. Jeremy Peña, Walker, Yainer Diaz, and Cam Smith each obtained two hits. During the bottom of the ninth inning, Tatsuya Imai pitched scoreless ball, including fanning Denzel Clarke to close out Houston's regular season, and a playoff berth.

==== Performance overview ====
The Astros concluded the 2026 season with an 81–81 record, in first place in the AL West division, one game ahead of the runners-up Texas Rangers, for their eighth AL West division title, 15th division title overall, and 19th playoff appearance. This signaled an 11th consecutive record of .500 or higher during a non-shortened season, (Note: Excluding the 2020 season, which was reduced to 60 games as a response to the COVID-19 pandemic, during which the Astros were 29–31 (.483).) each since 2015. Moreover, Houston clinched a playoff entrance for the 10th time in 12 seasons, furthering a franchise-best span. (Note: Including 2015, and each season from 2017 to 2024.) The Astros led the major leagues in home runs (226) for the first time since 2000. They also led the AL in total bases (2278), and ranked fifth in the league in runs scored (734). Hence, they were accorded the fourth edition of the AL team Silver Slugger Award.

Yordan Alvarez led the major leagues with a .316 batting average to become Houston's third batting champion, joining Jose Altuve (2014, 2016, and 2017), and Yuli Gurriel (2021), and became the first player in club history to lead the league in on-base percentage (.432 OBP). He ranked second in the American League to Pete Alonso of the Baltimore Orioles in both home runs (43 to 42, tied with Junior Caminero of the Tampa Bay Rays) and RBI (113 to 106), and second in hits to Yandy Díaz of Tampa Bay (180 to 179). Moreover, Alvarez became the 26th major leaguer to bat .300, score 100 runs, hit 30 doubles, 40 home runs, 100 RBI, and draw 100 walks, each within the same season. (Note: Also became second Astro following Jeff Bagwell (1999 and 2000). Criteria: Number of seasons player meets criteria, in the regular season, requiring Doubles ≥ 30 and Home Runs ≥ 40 and Runs Batted In ≥ 100 and Batting Average ≥ .300 and Runs ≥ 100 and Bases on Balls ≥ 100, sorted by descending instances.)

Alvarez was also accorded a number of end-of-season awards, most prominently and unanimously as AL Most Valuable Player (MVP). He also garnered AL Hank Aaron, Edgar Martinez Outstanding Designated Hitter, and All-MLB First Team honors. Moreover, Alvarez earned Silver Slugger, and Players Choice Awards for AL Outstanding Player and AL Comeback Player. and The Sporting News Comeback Player of the Year. Alvarez became the second primary DH to earn the MVP, succeeding Shohei Ohtani (4 times, 2021, and 2023 to 2025), as well as the third Astro to win an MVP, joining Jeff Bagwell in 1994 and Jose Altuve in 2017. Alvarez earned his sixth All-MLB Team selection in the eighth season of the award's conduction, which led baseball. This was second in total selections to Ohtani with eight, who had earned two each in 2021 to 2023 as both a pitcher and designated hitter. His second Silver Slugger, Alvarez became the fifth multiple-time winner as a member of the Astros.

First baseman Christian Walker won his fourth career Gold Glove Award, becoming the third Astro to win at the position. He was also the third first baseman to win in both the National and American Leagues, joining Matt Olson, a winner this season as a member of the Atlanta Braves, and J. T. Snow. Former Astros first baseman to be recognized included Jeff Bagwell (1994) and Yuli Gurriel (2021). Moreover, since 2014, this was the 11th time in 13 seasons in which at least one Astro had received a Gold Glove.

As of 2026, two of the three active players whose career batting average stood at .300 or higher were on the Astros' roster: Alvarez (.300) and Jose Altuve (.300) (minimum 2000 plate appearances). (Note: Luis Arráez (.316) was the active leader, while, ranking fourth was Freddie Freeman (.299). Criteria: For combined seasons, up to 2026, active, in the regular season, requiring Plate Appearances ≥ 2000 and Batting Average ≥ .285, sorted by descending Batting Average.)

This roster featured eight pitchers who had thrown in a no-hitter during their major league career: Bryan Abreu, Ronel Blanco, Josh Hader, Tatsuya Imai, Cristian Javier, Steven Okert, Nate Pearson, and Alimber Santa. Of the group, only Pearson and Hader had not pitched in a no-hitter as a member of the Astros.

=== League standings ===
==== American League West ====
AL West
Team	W	L	Pct.	GB	Home	Road
Houston Astros	81	81	.500	—	39‍–‍42	42‍–‍39
Texas Rangers	80	82	.494	1	45‍–‍36	35‍–‍46
Seattle Mariners	76	86	.469	5	43‍–‍38	33‍–‍48
Athletics	64	98	.395	17	32‍–‍49	32‍–‍49
Los Angeles Angels	62	100	.383	19	34‍–‍47	28‍–‍53

==== American League Wild Card ====
Wild Card standings

Division leaders
Team	W	L	Pct.
Tampa Bay Rays	98	64	.605
Cleveland Guardians	85	77	.525
Houston Astros	81	81	.500

Wild Card teams (Top 3 teams qualify for postseason)
Team	W	L	Pct.	GB
New York Yankees	93	68	.578	+9½
Boston Red Sox	87	75	.537	+3
Chicago White Sox	84	78	.519	—
Texas Rangers	80	82	.494	4
Baltimore Orioles	79	82	.491	4½
Toronto Blue Jays	79	83	.488	5
Minnesota Twins	77	85	.475	7
Detroit Tigers	76	86	.469	8
Seattle Mariners	76	86	.469	8
Kansas City Royals	69	93	.426	15
Athletics	64	98	.395	20
Los Angeles Angels	62	100	.383	22

==== Record against opponents ====
American League

2026 American League record Source: MLB Standings Grid – 2026
Team	ATH	BAL	BOS	CWS	CLE	DET	HOU	KC	LAA	MIN	NYY	SEA	TB	TEX	TOR	NL
Athletics	—	2–4	3–4	1–5	1–5	0–6	6–7	2–5	8–5	3–3	3–3	7–6	0–6	7–6	2–4	19–29
Baltimore	4–2	—	4–9	4–2	3–4	4–2	5–1	5–1	3–3	3–3	3–9	3–4	8–5	2–4	7–6	21–27
Boston	4–3	9–4	—	6–0	3–3	5–2	1–5	5–1	4–2	1–5	6–7	3–3	6–7	3–3	4–9	27–21
Chicago	5–1	2–4	0–6	—	7–6	9–4	2–5	9–4	4–2	8–5	3–4	3–3	2–4	4–2	5–1	21–27
Cleveland	5–1	4–3	3–3	6–7	—	10–3	2–4	7–6	6–0	6–7	2–4	4–3	1–5	2–4	2–4	25–23
Detroit	6–0	2–4	2–5	4–9	3–10	—	2–5	6–7	3–3	5–8	4–2	4–2	4–2	4–2	3–3	24–24
Houston	7–6	1–5	5–1	5–2	4–2	5–2	—	4–2	7–6	2–4	3–3	3–10	2–4	9–4	3–3	21–27
Kansas City	5–2	1–5	1–5	4–9	6–7	7–6	2–4	—	5–1	8–5	0–6	5–1	2–5	1–5	3–3	19–29
Los Angeles	5–8	3–3	2–4	2–4	0–6	3–3	6–7	1–5	—	3–4	3–4	6–7	3–3	8–5	2–4	15–33
Minnesota	3–3	3–3	5–1	5–8	7–6	8–5	4–2	5–8	4–3	—	3–3	2–4	1–5	5–1	4–3	18–30
New York	3–3	9–3	7–6	4–3	4–2	2–4	3–3	6–0	4–3	3–3	—	4–2	6–7	4–2	7–6	27–21
Seattle	6–7	4–3	3–3	3–3	3–4	2–4	10–3	1–5	7–6	4–2	2–4	—	1–5	5–8	2–4	23–25
Tampa Bay	6–0	5–8	7–6	4–2	5–1	2–4	4–2	5–2	3–3	5–1	7–6	5–1	—	4–3	9–4	27–21
Texas	6–7	4–2	3–3	2–4	4–2	2–4	4–9	5–1	5–8	1–5	2–4	8–5	3–4	—	6–1	25–23
Toronto	4–2	6–7	9–4	1–5	4–2	3–3	3–3	3–3	4–2	3–4	6–7	4–2	4–9	1–6	—	24–24

Updated with the results of all games through September 27, 2026.
National League

2026 American League record vs. National League Source: MLB Standings
Team	AZ	ATL	CHC	CIN	COL	LAD	MIA	MIL	NYM	PHI	PIT	SD	SF	STL	WSH
Athletics	1–2	1–2	2–1	0–3	2–1	1–2	0–3	2–1	3–0	1–2	1–2	1–2	2–4	1–2	1–2
Baltimore	1–2	1–2	1–2	2–1	1–2	2–1	2–1	0–3	3–0	1–2	0–3	1–2	2–1	2–1	2–4
Boston	2–1	2–4	2–1	1–2	1–2	3–0	2–1	2–1	3–0	1–2	1–2	1–2	3–0	2–1	1–2
Chicago	2–1	2–1	3–3	1–2	2–1	2–1	1–2	0–3	2–1	1–2	0–3	2–1	1–2	1–2	1–2
Cleveland	1–2	1–2	2–1	4–2	3–0	2–1	3–0	1–2	0–3	2–1	1–2	1–2	2–1	1–2	1–2
Detroit	1–3	1–2	2–1	1–2	3–0	1–2	3–0	2–1	0–3	1–2	3–3	2–1	2–1	2–1	1–2
Houston	1–2	0–3	3–0	1–2	2–4	1–2	3–0	1–2	2–1	2–1	1–2	1–2	2–1	0–3	1–2
Kansas City	1–2	1–2	1–2	2–1	0–3	0–3	1–2	1–2	1–2	2–1	0–3	2–1	3–0	3–3	1–2
Los Angeles	1–2	1–2	1–2	2–1	1–2	1–5	1–2	1–2	1–2	0–3	1–2	1–2	1–2	2–1	0–3
Minnesota	2–1	3–0	1–2	0–3	2–1	0–3	2–1	2–4	1–2	0–3	0–3	0–3	2–1	2–1	1–2
New York	1–2	2–1	2–1	1–2	3–0	1–2	2–1	0–3	3–3	2–1	2–1	1–2	3–0	1–2	3–0
Seattle	3–0	2–1	2–1	1–2	2–1	1–2	0–3	1–2	2–1	2–1	1–2	0–6	2–1	3–0	1–2
Tampa Bay	3–0	2–1	1–2	1–2	3–0	0–3	3–3	1–2	1–2	2–1	1–2	3–0	3–0	1–2	2–1
Texas	4–2	1–2	2–1	0–3	2–1	1–2	1–2	1–2	1–2	2–1	2–1	2–1	2–1	2–1	2–1
Toronto	1–2	1–2	1–2	2–1	1–2	1–2	2–1	1–2	2–1	3–3	2–1	1–2	2–1	2–1	2–1

Updated with the results of all games through September 27, 2026.

==== Lone Star Series ====
Date	Winning team	Score	Winning pitcher	Losing pitcher	Attendance	Location	Box
May 15	Houston	2–0	Spencer Arrighetti	Jack Leiter	32,555	Houston	
May 16	Houston	4–1	Kai-Wei Teng	Jacob deGrom	32,315	Houston	
May 17	Texas	0–8	Nathan Eovaldi	Peter Lambert	34,893	Houston	
May 25	Houston	9–0	Tatsuya Imai	Kumar Rocker	36,180	Arlington	
May 26	Texas	7–10	Jack Leiter	Jason Alexander	28,778	Arlington	
May 27	Houston	4–3	Mike Burrows	Tyler Alexander	27,073	Arlington	
May 28	Houston	5–1	Spencer Arrighetti	Nathan Eovaldi	27,234	Arlington	
July 10	Texas	3–7	Cole Winn	Bryan King	34,899	Arlington	
July 11	Houston	9–3	Peter Lambert	Kumar Rocker	37,318	Arlington	
July 12	Texas	5–6	Jacob Latz	Josh Hader	33,804	Arlington	
July 31	Houston	11–2	Hunter Brown	Nathan Eovaldi	36,621	Houston	
August 1	Houston	5–4	Steven Okert	Jacob deGrom	38,461	Houston	
August 2	Houston	7–3	Bryan Abreu	Tyler Alexander	33,955	Houston	

†	Game during which winning team clinched season series

=== Transactions ===
Free agents

Player	Position	Date	Organization departed	Gaining organization	Ref.
Dustin Harris	Outfielder	April 18, 2026	Chicago White Sox	Houston Astros	
Josh Hendrickson	Pitcher	April 18, 2026	Kansas City Monarchs	Houston Astros	
Daniel Johnson	Outfielder	April 19, 2026	Miami Marlins	Houston Astros	
Dustin Harris	Outfielder	May 11, 2026	Houston Astros	Chicago White Sox	
LaMonte Wade Jr.	Outfielder	June 4, 2026	Chicago White Sox	Houston Astros	
Daniel Johnson	Outfielder	June 13, 2026	Houston Astros	Caliente de Durango	
Rhylan Thomas	Outfielder	June 15, 2026	Houston Astros	Toronto Blue Jays	
Christian Roa	Pitcher	July 3, 2026	Chicago Cubs	Houston Astros	
Braden Shewmake	Infielder	July 31, 2026	Milwaukee Brewers	Houston Astros	
J. P. France	Pitcher	August 2, 2026	Houston Astros	San Diego Padres	

Waiver claims

Player	Position	Date	Organization departed	Gaining organization	Ref.
Christian Roa	Pitcher	April 23, 2026	Houston Astros	Minnesota Twins	
Rhylan Thomas	Outfielder	May 9, 2026	Seattle Mariners	Houston Astros	
Nelson Velázquez	Outfielder	August 10, 2026	St. Louis Cardinals	Houston Astros	
Shay Whitcomb	Infielder	August 13, 2026	Houston Astros	San Francisco Giants	
Jorge Barrosa	Outfielder	September 6, 2026	Arizona Diamondbacks	Houston Astros	

Trades

April 19, 2026	To New York Yankees Wilmy Sánchez (RHP)	To Houston Astros Braden Shewmake (IF)
June 10, 2026	To Tampa Bay Rays Cash considerations	To Houston Astros Raynel Delgado (IF)
June 20, 2026	To Chicago Cubs Jayden Murray (RHP)	To Houston Astros Cameron Sisneros (1B)
July 12, 2026	To Milwaukee Brewers Braden Shewmake (IF)	To Houston Astros Cash considerations
July 15, 2026	To Milwaukee Brewers Lance McCullers Jr. (RHP) Colton Gordon (LHP) Cash considerations	To Houston Astros Jayden Fielder (DH/LF)
July 22, 2026	To Kansas City Royals Nate Pearson (RHP)	To Houston Astros Max Martin (RHP)
August 3, 2026	To Toronto Blue Jays Spencer Arrighetti (RHP)	To Houston Astros Daulton Varsho (CF)

== Game log ==
=== Regular season ===
Past games legend
Astros Win (#bfb)	Astros Loss (#fbb)	Game postponed (#bbb)	Clinched division (#090)
Bold denotes an Astros pitcher

Future Games Legend
Home Game	Away Game

2026 Game Log
Total: 81–81 (Home: 39–42; Away: 42–39)
March/April: 12–20 (Home: 8–8; Away: 4–12)

#	Date	Opponent	Score	Win	Loss	Save	Location	Attendance	Record
1	March 26	Angels	0–3	Soriano (1–0)	**Blubaugh** (0–1)	Romano (1)	**Daikin Park**	41,329	0–1
2	March 27	Angels	2–6	Zeferjahn (1–0)	**Burrows** (0–1)	—	**Daikin Park**	30,788	0–2
3	March 28	Angels	11–9	**Teng** (1–0)	Ureña (0–1)	—	**Daikin Park**	30,740	1–2
4	March 29	Angels	9–7	**Blubaugh** (1–0)	Pomeranz (0–1)	**King** (1)	**Daikin Park**	30,848	2–2
5	March 30	Red Sox	8–1	**McCullers Jr.** (1–0)	Suárez (0–1)	—	**Daikin Park**	23,532	3–2
6	March 31	Red Sox	9–2	**Brown** (1–0)	Bello (0–1)	**Bolton** (1)	**Daikin Park**	26,930	4–2
7	April 1	Red Sox	6–4	**Burrows** (1–1)	Crochet (1–1)	**Abreu** (1)	**Daikin Park**	25,272	5–2
8	April 3	@ Athletics	4–11	Springs (1–0)	**Javier** (0–1)	—	Sutter Health Park	12,410	5–3
9	April 4	@ Athletics	11–0	**Imai** (1–0)	Morales (0–2)	—	Sutter Health Park	12,015	6–3
10	April 5	@ Athletics	10–12 (10)	Alvarado (1–0)	**Abreu** (0–1)	—	Sutter Health Park	10,085	6–4
11	April 6	@ Rockies	7–9	Feltner (1–0)	**Weiss** (0–1)	Mejía (1)	Coors Field	16,301	6–5
12	April 7	@ Rockies	1–5	Freeland (1–1)	**Burrows** (1–2)	Senzatela (1)	Coors Field	17,328	6–6
13	April 8	@ Rockies	1–9	Lorenzen (1–1)	**Blubaugh** (1–2)	Agnos (1)	Coors Field	15,189	6–7
14	April 10	@ Mariners	6–9	Hancock (2–1)	**Weiss** (0–2)	Muñoz (1)	T-Mobile Park	44,468	6–8
15	April 11	@ Mariners	7–8	Muñoz (2–1)	**Abreu** (0–2)	—	T-Mobile Park	43,294	6–9
16	April 12	@ Mariners	1–6	Gilbert (1–2)	**Bolton** (0–1)	—	T-Mobile Park	29,071	6–10
17	April 13	@ Mariners	2–6	Kirby (2–2)	**Burrows** (1–3)	—	T-Mobile Park	18,648	6–11
18	April 14	Rockies	7–6	**Blubaugh** (2–2)	Lorenzen (1–2)	**De Los Santos** (1)	**Daikin Park**	29,536	7–11
19	April 15	Rockies	3–1	**Arrighetti** (1–0)	Quintana (0–1)	**De Los Santos** (2)	**Daikin Park**	28,298	8–11
20	April 16	Rockies	2–3	Dollander (2–1)	**Roa** (0–1)	Vodnik (2)	**Daikin Park**	27,842	8–12
21	April 17	Cardinals	4–9	Leahy (2–2)	**Lambert** (0–1)	—	**Daikin Park**	33,086	8–13
22	April 18	Cardinals	5–7	Pallante (2–1)	**McCullers Jr.** (1–1)	O'Brien (6)	**Daikin Park**	33,319	8–14
23	April 19	Cardinals	5–7 (10)	O'Brien (3–0)	**King** (0–1)	Graceffo (1)	**Daikin Park**	33,491	8–15
24	April 20	@ Guardians	9–2	**Arrighetti** (2–0)	Cecconi (0–3)	—	Progressive Field	12,565	9–15
25	April 21	@ Guardians	5–8	Pallette (1–1)	**De Los Santos** (0–1)	—	Progressive Field	15,448	9–16
26	April 22	@ Guardians	2–0	**Lambert** (1–1)	Bibee (0–3)	**De Los Santos** (3)	Progressive Field	15,722	10–16
27	April 24	Yankees	4–12	Warren (3–0)	**McCullers Jr.** (1–2)	—	**Daikin Park**	37,852	10–17
28	April 25	Yankees	3–8	Cruz (2–0)	**Teng** (1–1)	—	**Daikin Park**	38,399	10–18
29	April 26	Yankees	7–4	**Arrighetti** (3–0)	Gil (1–2)	—	**Daikin Park**	35,622	11–18
30	April 28	@ Orioles	3–5	Baz (1–2)	**Teng** (1–2)	Helsley (7)	Camden Yards	13,233	11–19
―	April 29	@ Orioles	**Postponed (rain)** (Makeup date: April 30)						
31	April 30 (1)	@ Orioles	3–10	Bassitt (2–2)	**Lambert** (1–2)	—	Camden Yards	see 2nd game	11–20
32	April 30 (2)	@ Orioles	11–5	**McCullers Jr.** (2–2)	Young (2–1)	—	Camden Yards	26,586	12–20

May: 15–14 (Home: 5–8; Away: 10–6)

#	Date	Opponent	Score	Win	Loss	Save	Location	Attendance	Record
33	May 1	@ Red Sox	1–3	Bennett (1–0)	**Burrows** (1–4)	Chapman (6)	Fenway Park	34,630	12–21
34	May 2	@ Red Sox	6–3	**Arrighetti** (4–0)	Early (2–2)	**King** (2)	Fenway Park	34,158	13–21
35	May 3	@ Red Sox	3–1 (10)	**Abreu** (1–2)	Kelly (0–2)	—	Fenway Park	35,406	14–21
36	May 4	Dodgers	3–8	Yamamoto (3–2)	**Weiss** (0–3)	—	**Daikin Park**	35,126	14–22
37	May 5	Dodgers	2–1	**Lambert** (2–2)	Ohtani (2–2)	**King** (3)	**Daikin Park**	37,008	15–22
38	May 6	Dodgers	2–12	Dreyer (2–1)	**McCullers Jr.** (2–3)	—	**Daikin Park**	32,741	15–23
39	May 8	@ Reds	10–0	**Burrows** (2–4)	Lodolo (0–1)	—	Great American Ball Park	24,347	16–23
40	May 9	@ Reds	1–3	Burns (4–1)	**Arrighetti** (4–1)	Johnson (1)	Great American Ball Park	35,688	16–24
41	May 10	@ Reds	0–5	Abbott (2–2)	**Teng** (1–3)	—	Great American Ball Park	23,980	16–25
42	May 11	Mariners	1–3	Kirby (5–2)	**Lambert** (2–3)	Muñoz (8)	**Daikin Park**	27,012	16–26
43	May 12	Mariners	2–10	Woo (3–2)	**Imai** (1–1)	—	**Daikin Park**	28,829	16–27
44	May 13	Mariners	4–3 (10)	**Abreu** (2–2)	Hoppe (0–1)	—	**Daikin Park**	27,540	17–27
45	May 14	Mariners	3–8	Castillo (1–4)	**Burrows** (2–5)	—	**Daikin Park**	24,398	17–28
46	May 15	Rangers	2–0	**Arrighetti** (5–1)	Leiter (1–4)	**King** (4)	**Daikin Park**	32,555	18–28
47	May 16	Rangers	4–1	**Teng** (2–3)	deGrom (3–3)	**Abreu** (2)	**Daikin Park**	32,315	19–28
48	May 17	Rangers	0–8	Eovaldi (5–4)	**Lambert** (2–4)	—	**Daikin Park**	34,893	19–29
49	May 18	@ Twins	3–6	Orze (2–1)	**Imai** (1–2)	Rogers (1)	Target Field	11,488	19–30
50	May 19	@ Twins	2–1	**Alexander** (1–0)	Matthews (1–1)	**Abreu** (3)	Target Field	13,557	20–30
51	May 20	@ Twins	1–4	Ryan (3–3)	**Burrows** (2–6)	Morris (1)	Target Field	23,552	20–31
52	May 22	@ Cubs	4–2	**Arrighetti** (6–1)	Taillon (2–4)	**King** (5)	Wrigley Field	37,332	21–31
53	May 23	@ Cubs	3–0	**Teng** (3–3)	Rea (4–3)	**King** (6)	Wrigley Field	40,017	22–31
54	May 24	@ Cubs	8–5	**Lambert** (3–4)	Imanaga (4–5)	**Pearson** (1)	Wrigley Field	40,048	23–31
55	May 25	@ Rangers	9–0	**Imai** (2–2)	Rocker (2–5)	—	Globe Life Field	36,180	24–31
56	May 26	@ Rangers	7–10	Leiter (2–4)	**Alexander** (1–1)	Latz (6)	Globe Life Field	28,778	24–32
57	May 27	@ Rangers	4–3	**Burrows** (3–6)	Alexander (1–1)	**De Los Santos** (4)	Globe Life Field	27,073	25–32
58	May 28	@ Rangers	5–1	**Arrighetti** (7–1)	Eovaldi (5–6)	—	Globe Life Field	27,234	26–32
59	May 29	Brewers	4–5 (10)	Uribe (3–2)	**Santa** (0–1)	Megill (7)	**Daikin Park**	29,978	26–33
60	May 30	Brewers	9–2	**Lambert** (4–4)	Sproat (1–4)	—	**Daikin Park**	32,115	27–33
61	May 31	Brewers	0–2	Misiorowski (6–2)	**Imai** (2–3)	Megill (8)	**Daikin Park**	28,366	27–34

June: 16–11 (Home: 8–6; Away: 8–5)

#	Date	Opponent	Score	Win	Loss	Save	Location	Attendance	Record
62	June 2	Pirates	6–10	Chandler (2–6)	**Burrows** (3–7)	Soto (8)	**Daikin Park**	25,513	27–35
63	June 3	Pirates	11–9	**Blubaugh** (3–2)	Soto (4–1)	**Hader** (1)	**Daikin Park**	26,956	28–35
64	June 4	Pirates	1–5	Jones (1–0)	**Teng** (3–4)	Mlodzinski (1)	**Daikin Park**	23,136	28–36
65	June 5	Athletics	5–1	**Lambert** (5–4)	Perkins (2–3)	—	**Daikin Park**	32,420	29–36
66	June 6	Athletics	13–2	**Imai** (3–3)	Morris (0–1)	—	**Daikin Park**	30,211	30–36
67	June 7	Athletics	0–5	Jump (2–1)	**Burrows** (3–8)	—	**Daikin Park**	28,878	30–37
68	June 8	@ Angels	5–4 (10)	**Hader** (1–0)	Aldegheri (1–1)	**Abreu** (4)	Angel Stadium	25,474	31–37
69	June 9	@ Angels	1–10	Ureña (4–4)	**Teng** (3–5)	—	Angel Stadium	24,767	31–38
70	June 10	@ Angels	2–3 (10)	Zeferjahn (3–3)	**Abreu** (2–3)	—	Angel Stadium	25,179	31–39
71	June 12	@ Royals	10–8	**Pearson** (1–0)	Avila (1–3)	**Hader** (2)	Kauffman Stadium	25,672	32–39
72	June 13	@ Royals	8–7	**King** (1–1)	Lange (0–4)	**Abreu** (5)	Kauffman Stadium	17,881	33–39
73	June 14	@ Royals	0–4	Kolek (4–1)	**Arrighetti** (7–2)	—	Kauffman Stadium	23,730	33–40
74	June 15	Tigers	3–9	Finnegan (2–0)	**Teng** (3–6)	—	**Daikin Park**	26,632	33–41
75	June 16	Tigers	4–2	**King** (2–1)	Montero (3–5)	**Hader** (3)	**Daikin Park**	31,244	34–41
76	June 17	Tigers	4–2	**Lambert** (6–4)	Mize (2–4)	**Hader** (4)	**Daikin Park**	31,476	35–41
77	June 19	Guardians	9–3	**Imai** (4–3)	Bibee (2–8)	—	**Daikin Park**	33,279	36–41
78	June 20	Guardians	1–8	Cantillo (6–3)	**Arrighetti** (7–3)	—	**Daikin Park**	32,678	36–42
79	June 21	Guardians	2–1	**Teng** (4–6)	Cecconi (3–6)	**Hader** (5)	**Daikin Park**	36,807	37–42
80	June 22	@ Blue Jays	2–4	Fisher (3–2)	**De Los Santos** (0–2)	Varland (16)	Rogers Centre	42,273	37–43
81	June 23	@ Blue Jays	9–7 (11)	**VanWey** (1–0)	Fisher (3–3)	—	Rogers Centre	38,633	38–43
82	June 24	@ Blue Jays	3–1	**Okert** (1–0)	Hoffman (5–5)	**Hader** (6)	Rogers Centre	39,264	39–43
83	June 25	@ Tigers	2–1	**Imai** (5–3)	Melton (4–1)	**De Los Santos** (5)	Comerica Park	25,066	40–43
84	June 26	@ Tigers	0–8	Montero (4–5)	**Arrighetti** (7–4)	—	Comerica Park	30,036	40–44
85	June 27	@ Tigers	8–6	**Blubaugh** (4–2)	Vest (3–5)	**Hader** (7)	Comerica Park	27,232	41–44
86	June 28	@ Tigers	7–5 (10)	**Hader** (2–0)	Jansen (1–4)	—	Comerica Park	33,655	42–44
87	June 29	Twins	4–5	Matthews (4–5)	**Lambert** (6–5)	Gómez (9)	**Daikin Park**	22,969	42–45
88	June 30	Twins	6–4	**Burrows** (4–8)	Ryan (5–5)	**Hader** (8)	**Daikin Park**	26,848	43–45

July: 13–10 (Home: 6–5; Away: 7–5)

#	Date	Opponent	Score	Win	Loss	Save	Location	Attendance	Record
89	July 1	Twins	3–8	Bradley (7–3)	**Imai** (5–4)	—	**Daikin Park**	29,179	43–46
90	July 3	Rays	1–3	Kelly (5–3)	**Okert** (1–1)	Baker (23)	**Daikin Park**	36,039	43–47
91	July 4	Rays	10–8	**Hader** (3–0)	Legumina (2–2)	—	**Daikin Park**	37,457	44–47
92	July 5	Rays	2–0	**Lambert** (7–5)	Englert (0–2)	**Hader** (9)	**Daikin Park**	29,003	45–47
93	July 6	@ Nationals	11–12	Mikolas (3–7)	**Burrows** (4–9)	Beeter (7)	Nationals Park	11,092	45–48
94	July 7	@ Nationals	6–3	**Okert** (2–1)	Alvarez (2–2)	**Hader** (10)	Nationals Park	20,424	46–48
95	July 8	@ Nationals	2–8	Griffin (10–2)	**Arrighetti** (7–5)	—	Nationals Park	17,760	46–49
96	July 10	@ Rangers	3–7	Winn (5–2)	**King** (2–2)	—	Globe Life Field	34,899	46–50
97	July 11	@ Rangers	9–3	**Lambert** (8–5)	Rocker (2–8)	—	Globe Life Field	37,318	47–50
98	July 12	@ Rangers	5–6	Latz (2–1)	**Hader** (3–1)	—	Globe Life Field	33,804	47–51
**96th All-Star Game in Philadelphia, Pennsylvania**
99	July 17	Orioles	2–3	Sanders (1–0)	**King** (2–3)	Wells (3)	**Daikin Park**	31,867	47–52
100	July 18	Orioles	2–4 (11)	Kittredge (1–1)	**De Los Santos** (0–3)	Sanders (1)	**Daikin Park**	31,649	47–53
101	July 19	Orioles	2–5	Young (8–2)	**Brown** (1–1)	Wolfram (1)	**Daikin Park**	28,936	47–54
102	July 20	Marlins	8–5	**De Los Santos** (1–3)	Junk (4–6)	—	**Daikin Park**	23,684	48–54
103	July 21	Marlins	5–3	**Imai** (6–4)	Phillips (2–5)	**Hader** (11)	**Daikin Park**	28,748	49–54
104	July 22	Marlins	5–2	**Okert** (3–1)	Alcántara (10–6)	**Abreu** (6)	**Daikin Park**	26,099	50–54
105	July 24	@ White Sox	9–5	**Teng** (5–6)	Hudson (3–3)	—	Rate Field	28,657	51–54
106	July 25	@ White Sox	4–1	**Brown** (2–1)	Burke (7–5)	**Hader** (12)	Rate Field	30,029	52–54
107	July 26	@ White Sox	3–12	Newcomb (1–2)	**Blanco** (0–1)	—	Rate Field	32,581	52–55
108	July 27	@ Angels	6–4	**Javier** (1–1)	Fermín (3–2)	**Hader** (13)	Angel Stadium	30,121	53–55
109	July 28	@ Angels	3–2	**Okert** (4–1)	Farris (0–2)	**Hader** (14)	Angel Stadium	32,051	54–55
110	July 29	@ Angels	7–4	**Wesneski** (1–0)	Farris (0–3)	**Abreu** (7)	Angel Stadium	26,417	55–55
111	July 31	Rangers	11–2	**Brown** (3–1)	Eovaldi (10–9)	—	**Daikin Park**	36,621	56–55

August: 14–13 (Home: 7–8; Away: 7–5)

#	Date	Opponent	Score	Win	Loss	Save	Location	Attendance	Record
112	August 1	Rangers	5–4	**Okert** (5–1)	deGrom (7–7)	**Hader** (15)	**Daikin Park**	38,461	57–55
113	August 2	Rangers	7–3	**Abreu** (3–3)	Alexander (1–2)	**Blubaugh** (1)	**Daikin Park**	33,955	58–55
114	August 3	Blue Jays	1–3	Bieber (3–2)	**Javier** (1–2)	Rogers (3)	**Daikin Park**	22,789	58–56
115	August 4	Blue Jays	7–2	**Wesneski** (2–0)	Dallas (1–1)	—	**Daikin Park**	30,450	59–56
116	August 5	Blue Jays	4–5 (10)	Varland (4–4)	**Sousa** (0–1)	Lee (1)	**Daikin Park**	27,751	59–57
117	August 7	@ Padres	6–3	**Abreu** (4–3)	Ray (10–7)	**Hader** (16)	Petco Park	40,958	60–57
118	August 8	@ Padres	2–3	King (7–8)	**Lambert** (8–6)	Miller (29)	Petco Park	41,937	60–58
119	August 9	@ Padres	2–7	Vásquez (8–6)	**Javier** (1–3)	—	Petco Park	40,160	60–59
120	August 10	@ Giants	6–3 (10)	**Hader** (4–1)	Foley (0–1)	—	Oracle Park	28,070	61–59
121	August 11	@ Giants	1–4	Whisenhunt (3–3)	**Brown** (3–2)	Brubaker (2)	Oracle Park	30,093	61–60
122	August 12	@ Giants	2–1	**Okert** (6–1)	Winn (2–3)	**Hader** (17)	Oracle Park	28,101	62–60
123	August 14	Mariners	10–7 (10)	**De Los Santos** (2–3)	Muñoz (5–5)	—	**Daikin Park**	30,582	63–60
124	August 15	Mariners	5–10	Hancock (7–7)	**Wesneski** (2–1)	—	**Daikin Park**	34,664	63–61
125	August 16	Mariners	2–3	Woo (9–8)	**Brown** (3–3)	Muñoz (22)	**Daikin Park**	27,971	63–62
126	August 18	Angels	1–3	Klassen (2–1)	**Javier** (1–4)	Joyce (3)	**Daikin Park**	22,767	63–63
127	August 19	Angels	3–2	**Sousa** (1–1)	Ureña (8–9)	**Hader** (18)	**Daikin Park**	21,162	64–63
128	August 20	Angels	3–18	Rodriguez (4–5)	**Lambert** (8–7)	—	**Daikin Park**	20,934	64–64
129	August 21	Athletics	4–0	**Wesneski** (3–1)	Ginn (8–8)	—	**Daikin Park**	28,477	65–64
130	August 22	Athletics	3–4	Medina (5–3)	**Sousa** (1–2)	Alvarado (3)	**Daikin Park**	31,009	65–65
131	August 23	Athletics	6–7	Perkins (3–9)	**Okert** (6–2)	Harris (13)	**Daikin Park**	30,708	65–66
132	August 25	@ Yankees	9–7	**Abreu** (5–3)	Headrick (7–3)	**Hader** (19)	Yankee Stadium	43,229	66–66
133	August 26	@ Yankees	3–9	Blackburn (6–2)	**Sousa** (1–3)	—	Yankee Stadium	40,269	66–67
134	August 27	@ Yankees	5–1	**Wesneski** (4–1)	Cole (7–7)	—	Yankee Stadium	41,203	67–67
135	August 28	@ Mets	3–1	**Brown** (4–3)	Scott (4–4)	**Hader** (20)	Citi Field	28,848	68–67
136	August 29	@ Mets	2–6	McLean (10–8)	**Javier** (1–5)	—	Citi Field	29,183	68–68
137	August 30	@ Mets	6–3	**Pecko** (1–0)	Pintaro (2–1)	**Hader** (21)	Citi Field	25,227	69–68
138	August 31	White Sox	6–3	**De Los Santos** (3–3)	Kay (9–7)	**Abreu** (8)	**Daikin Park**	21,236	70–68

September: 11–13 (Home: 5–7; Away: 6–6)

#	Date	Opponent	Score	Win	Loss	Save	Location	Attendance	Record
139	September 1	White Sox	1–5	Burke (8–6)	**Teng** (5–7)	—	**Daikin Park**	26,838	70–69
140	September 2	White Sox	2–0	**Blubaugh** (5–2)	Newcomb (2–4)	**Hader** (22)	**Daikin Park**	24,025	71–69
141	September 3	White Sox	6–2	**Brown** (5–3)	Castillo (4–11)	—	**Daikin Park**	24,155	72–69
142	September 4	Diamondbacks	3–1	**Javier** (2–5)	Kelly (9–13)	**Hader** (23)	**Daikin Park**	33,482	73–69
143	September 5	Diamondbacks	3–4 (10)	Loáisiga (7–3)	**King** (2–4)	—	**Daikin Park**	36,470	73–70
144	September 6	Diamondbacks	2–3	Rodríguez (15–5)	**Lambert** (8–8)	Ginkel (3)	**Daikin Park**	39,478	73–71
145	September 8	@ Phillies	6–5	**Wesneski** (5–1)	Painter (3–9)	**Hader** (24)	Citizens Bank Park	39,262	74–71
146	September 9	@ Phillies	7–11	Sánchez (17–5)	**King** (2–5)	—	Citizens Bank Park	38,642	74–72
147	September 10	@ Phillies	2–1	**Abreu** (6–3)	Durán (2–6)	**Hader** (25)	Citizens Bank Park	37,100	75–72
148	September 11	@ Rays	1–3	Baker (2–2)	**Abreu** (6–4)	—	Tropicana Field	16,217	75–73
149	September 12	@ Rays	2–3	Wells (5–2)	**Lambert** (8–9)	Baker (40)	Tropicana Field	24,462	75–74
150	September 13	@ Rays	4–14	Peralta (9–11)	**Wesneski** (5–2)	—	Tropicana Field	18,718	75–75
151	September 15	Royals	4–2	**Brown** (6–3)	Wacha (9–9)	**Hader** (26)	**Daikin Park**	28,635	76–75
152	September 16	Royals	2–5	Lynch (6–5)	**Javier** (2–6)	—	**Daikin Park**	28,497	76–76
153	September 17	Royals	6–2	**King** (3–5)	Lugo (7–9)	—	**Daikin Park**	34,853	77–76
154	September 18	Braves	2–6	Mahle (7–10)	**Lambert** (8–10)	—	**Daikin Park**	36,921	77–77
155	September 19	Braves	3–6	Holmes (10–5)	**Blubaugh** (5–3)	Iglesias (34)	**Daikin Park**	41,147	77–78
156	September 20	Braves	2–4	Mederos (5–1)	**King** (3–6)	Dodd (2)	**Daikin Park**	36,612	77–79
157	September 22	@ Mariners	7–0	**Ullola** (1–0)	Gilbert (12–11)	—	T-Mobile Park	33,382	78–79
158	September 23	@ Mariners	5–6 (10)	Criswell (4–2)	**Hader** (4–2)	—	T-Mobile Park	24,802	78–80
159	September 24	@ Athletics	7–5	**Ullola** (2–0)	Blewett (2–2)	**Abreu** (9)	Sutter Health Park	9,367	79–80
160	September 25	@ Athletics	5–6	Lopez (7–5)	**Brown** (6–4)	Harris (17)	Sutter Health Park	9,012	79–81
161	September 26	@ Athletics	13–2	**Wesneski** (6–2)	Perkins (3–13)	—	Sutter Health Park	12,025	80–81
162	September 27	@ Athletics	9–0	**Pecko** (2–0)	Basso (1–4)	—	Sutter Health Park	10,022	81–81

=== Composite line score ===
Team	1	2	3	4	5	6	7	8	9	10	R	H	E
Opponents	86	69	103	99	122	69	89	69	39	21	**766**	**1276**	**94**
**Houston Astros**	90	73	98	78	85	75	68	97	47	24	**734**	**1320**	**73**
Home runs: OPP: 204; HOU: 226; Total attendance: 2,472,118 Average attendance: 30,519; Boxscore

=== Bating orders ===
No.	Most common (2×)	Most appearances
1	Peña	Peña (105)
2	Alvarez	Alvarez (147)
3	Paredes	Paredes (108)
4	Altuve	Walker (58) • Altuve (50)
5	Díaz	Altuve (30) • Walker (27) • Smith (23)
6	Walker	Smith (39) • Walker (32)
7	Trammell	Smith (38) • Trammell (24)
8	Smith	Smith (31)
9	Wade Jr.	Vázquez (65)

== Postseason ==
=== Summary ===
For the third time in playoff history, the Chicago White Sox faced the Houston Astros. Previous matchups included the 2005 World Series, won by Chicago, and the 2021 American League Division Series (ALDS), won by Houston.

==== American League Wild Card Series Game 1 ====
September 29, 2026 4:10 pm (CDT) at Daikin Park, Houston, Texas 72 °F (22 °C), roof closed
Team	1	2	3	4	5	6	7	8	9	R	H	E
Chicago	1	2	0	1	1	0	1	0	0	6	11	1
Houston	0	0	0	0	2	0	0	1	0	3	6	1
WP: Jordan Hicks (1–0) LP: AJ Blubaugh (0–1); Home runs: CWS: Colson Montgomery (1); HOU: Nelson Velázquez (1); Attendance: 34,011; Boxscore

Through the first four innings, Chicago mounted a 4–0, opening the scoring off rookie reliever AJ Blubaugh (0–1) who was making his first start of the season. He recorded just two outs, walked three, and allowed a sacrifice fly to Munetaka Murakami. During the top of the second inning, Sam Antonacci stroked a bases-loaded single off Bryan King to stretch the White Sox' lead to 3–0. The Astros utilized seven relievers, with Miguel Ullola tossing three innings with four strikeouts to go the longest. The Astros scored their first runs during the bottom of the fifth when pinch hitter Nelson Velázquez hit a two-run home run. This was Velázquez' first career plate appearance in the playoffs.

==== American League Wild Card Series Game 2 ====
September 30, 2026 4:11 pm (CDT) at Daikin Park, Houston, Texas 73 °F (23 °C), Roof Closed
Team	1	2	3	4	5	6	7	8	9	R	H	E
Chicago	4	0	0	0	0	3	0	0	0	7	8	0
Houston	1	1	0	1	0	0	0	0	0	3	5	2
WP: Anthony Kay (1–0) LP: Hunter Brown (0–1); Home runs: CWS: Chase Meidroth (1); HOU: Jeremy Peña (1), Cam Smith (1), Jose Altuve (1); Attendance: 36,015; Boxscore

Astros starter Hunter Brown lasted through just 2/3 inning as Chicago batted around and mounted 4–0 lead. Jeremy Peña, Cam Smith and Jose Altuve each homered for Houston. In the top of the sixth inning, Chicago scored thrice more to augment a 7–3 lead and bury Houston's chance to advance to the American League Division Series (ALDS). Altuve's home run was the 28th of 107 games in postseason play, one away from Manny Ramirez' all-time record of 29. Moreover, Altuve had two hits to become the first player to register 120 hits and 25 home runs each during a postseason career. (Note: For combined seasons, in the postseason, requiring hits ≥ 120 and home runs ≥ 25, sorted by descending hits.)

This was Chicago's first playoff series victory since 2005, when they claimed the World Series championship over Houston. The sweep indicated a ninth consecutive loss at home during the playoffs for the Astros, whose most recent home win had occurred during Game One of the 2023 ALDS over the Minnesota Twins.

=== Game log ===
2026 Postseason Game Log
Total: 0–2 (Home: 0–2; Away: 0–0)
AL Wild Card Series vs White Sox: 0–2 (Home: 0–2; Away: 0–0)

#	Date	Opponent	Score	Win	Loss	Save	Attendance	Record
1	September 29	White Sox	3–6	Hicks (1–0)	Blubaugh (0–1)	―	34,011	0–1
2	September 30	White Sox	3–7	Kay (1–0)	Brown (0–1)	—	36,015	0–2

=== Postseason rosters ===
Playoff rosters
American League Wild Card Series

- Pitchers: 38 Peter Lambert 39 Hayden Wesneski 45 Tatsuya Imai 52 Bryan Abreu 58 Hunter Brown 61 Josh Hendrickson 62 Bennett Sousa 64 Logan VanWey 66 Miguel Ullola 69 AJ Blubaugh 71 Josh Hader 74 Bryan King
- Catchers: 2 Christian Vázquez 21 Yainer Díaz
- Infielders: 3 Jeremy Peña 8 Christian Walker 15 Isaac Paredes 20 Nick Allen 27 Jose Altuve 29 Raynel Delgado
- Outfielders: 10 Joey Loperfido 11 Cam Smith 26 Taylor Trammell 28 Lucas Spence 30 Nelson Velázquez 44 Yordan Alvarez

== Player statistics ==
Table legend
*	Left-handed batter or pitcher	League leader (Bold: MLB leader)
#	Switch hitter	League top ten
	Leader in appearances at position	Team leader

=== Batting ===
Statistics legend
⌖	Primary position	AB	At bats	2B	Doubles	RBI	Runs batted in	SB	Stolen bases	SLG	Slugging percentage
G	Games played	R	Runs scored	3B	Triples	BB	Bases on balls	AVG	Batting average	OPS	On-base plus slugging percentage
PA	Plate appearances	H	Hits	HR	Home runs	SO	Strikeouts	OBP	On-base percentage

==== Regular season results ====
⌖	Player	G	PA	AB	R	H	2B	3B	HR	RBI	SB	BB	SO	AVG	OBP	SLG	OPS
C	Yainer Díaz	98	361	344	38	98	16	1	14	45	0	12	57	.285	.313	.459	.772
1B	Christian Walker	156	635	571	73	129	26	1	29	87	0	51	147	.226	.299	.427	.727
2B	Jose Altuve	135	573	514	70	131	24	2	16	50	5	41	114	.250	.306	.395	.701
3B	Isaac Paredes	155	659	562	69	147	27	1	25	94	0	71	88	.262	.360	.447	.806
SS	Jeremy Peña	112	482	447	82	124	19	2	22	56	12	24	116	.277	.325	.477	.802
LF	Taylor Trammell*	99	289	255	29	49	10	2	8	22	4	29	93	.192	.285	.341	.626
CF	Daulton Varsho*	41	161	151	12	26	4	1	5	14	3	10	36	.172	.224	.311	.535
RF	Cam Smith	157	568	510	67	107	17	6	21	56	12	44	148	.210	.279	.390	.669
DH	Yordan Alvarez*	158	692	567	105	179	34	1	42	106	1	**109**	120	**.316**	**.432**	**.601**	**1.033**
C	Christian Vázquez	86	266	242	22	50	7	0	7	25	1	18	55	.207	.261	.323	.583
OF	Brice Matthews	84	233	214	23	43	5	1	7	22	4	16	74	.201	.255	.332	.587
MI	Nick Allen	94	162	145	26	41	7	0	3	14	2	10	32	.283	.327	.393	.720
CF	Jake Meyers	57	153	141	15	30	7	0	3	11	1	10	31	.213	.268	.326	.594
LF	LaMonte Wade Jr.*	56	146	127	18	26	6	0	4	19	0	19	36	.205	.308	.346	.655
IF	Carlos Correa	32	141	122	22	34	8	0	3	16	1	18	26	.279	.369	.418	.787
LF	Joey Loperfido*	40	121	103	13	22	7	1	1	12	1	14	32	.214	.311	.320	.641
IF	Braden Shewmake*	30	83	78	10	20	4	0	3	9	0	2	13	.256	.272	.423	.695
LF	Zach Dezenzo	35	82	75	11	16	4	0	1	3	1	7	31	.213	.280	.307	.587
CF	Lucas Spence*	19	63	55	9	12	2	1	4	12	0	7	22	.218	.317	.509	.827
OF	Zach Cole*	19	53	51	4	8	1	0	3	8	0	1	21	.157	.189	.353	.542
IF	Ray Delgado*	20	41	37	4	9	1	0	1	4	0	3	7	.243	.300	.351	.651
OF	Dustin Harris*	11	36	31	4	7	0	1	0	4	2	2	6	.226	.286	.290	.576
OF	Nelson Velázquez	18	30	27	2	3	0	0	2	6	0	2	13	.111	.167	.333	.500
UT	Shay Whitcomb	17	24	23	2	3	0	0	2	5	0	1	11	.130	.167	.391	.558
C	César Salazar*	9	22	18	0	1	0	0	0	1	0	3	3	.056	.227	.056	.283
OF	Daniel Johnson*	8	17	14	1	2	0	0	0	0	0	2	3	.143	.194	.143	.437
OF	Jorge Barrosa^{#}	8	15	11	2	1	1	0	0	0	0	3	4	.091	.286	.182	.468
UT	Collin Price	7	13	12	1	2	1	0	0	0	0	1	6	.167	.231	.250	.481
**Team totals**		**162**	**6122**	**5457**	**734**	**1320**	**238**	**21**	**226**	**701**	**50**	**530**	**1343**	**.242**	**.315**	**.417**	**.733**

==== Postseason results ====
Player	G	PA	AB	R	H	2B	3B	HR	RBI	SB	BB	SO	AVG	OBP	SLG	OPS
Jose Altuve	2	8	8	1	2	0	0	1	1	0	0	1	.250	.250	.625	.875
Yordan Alvarez*	2	8	8	0	1	0	0	0	0	0	0	2	.125	.125	.125	.250
Yainer Díaz	2	8	8	0	0	0	0	0	0	0	0	4	.000	.000	.000	.000
Isaac Paredes	2	8	6	0	1	0	0	0	0	0	1	2	.167	.375	.167	.542
Jeremy Peña	2	8	8	2	3	0	0	1	1	0	0	2	.375	.375	.750	1.125
Cam Smith	2	8	7	1	2	0	0	1	1	0	0	3	.286	.375	.714	1.089
Lucas Spence*	2	8	8	1	1	0	0	0	0	0	0	3	.125	.125	.125	.250
Christian Walker	2	8	6	0	0	0	0	0	0	0	2	3	.000	.250	.000	.250
Nick Allen	1	3	3	0	0	0	0	0	0	0	0	1	.000	.000	.000	.000
Nelson Velázquez	1	3	3	1	1	0	0	1	2	0	0	1	.333	.333	1.333	1.667
Taylor Trammell*	1	1	1	0	0	0	0	0	0	0	0	0	.000	.000	.000	.000
**Team totals**	**2**	**71**	**65**	**6**	**11**	**0**	**0**	**4**	**5**	**0**	**3**	**22**	**.169**	**.229**	**.354**	**.582**

=== Pitching ===
Statistics legend
⌖	Primary role	ERA	Earned run average	GF	Games finished	IP	Innings pitched	ER	Earned runs allowed	WHIP	Walks plus hits per inning pitched
W	Wins	G	Games pitched	SV	Saves	H	Hits allowed	BB	Base on balls	K/BB	Strikeout-to-walk ratio
L	Losses	GS	Games started	HD	Holds	R	Runs allowed	SO	Strikeouts

==== Regular season results ====
⌖	Player	W	L	ERA	G	GS	GF	SV	HD	IP	H	R	ER	BB	SO	WHIP	K/BB
SP	Peter Lambert	8	10	3.82	29	29	0	0	0	155 2/3	136	68	66	59	154	1.253	2.61
SP	Hunter Brown	6	4	3.19	20	20	0	0	0	107 1/3	81	42	38	50	124	1.267	2.25
SP	Mike Burrows	4	9	5.99	18	17	1	0	0	94 2/3	112	69	63	35	75	1.553	2.14
SP	Spencer Arrighetti	7	5	4.60	17	17	0	0	0	88	68	47	45	50	87	1.341	1.74
SP	Tatsuya Imai	6	4	5.13	23	15	6	0	0	76 2/3	58	42	42	51	97	1.422	1.90
SP	Cristian Javier	2	6	5.14	17	12	2	0	0	63	64	36	36	28	59	1.460	2.11
CL	Josh Hader*	4	2	1.01	45	0	37	26	0	44 1/3	16	6	5	15	55	0.761	3.67
MR	AJ Blubaugh	5	3	3.66	64	0	9	1	12	96	76	41	389	44	94	1.229	2.24
MR	Enyel De Los Santos	3	3	4.79	66	0	18	5	10	71 1/3	69	43	38	20	67	1.248	3.35
MR	Steven Okert*	6	2	2.13	68	1	1	0	21	67 2/3	45	17	16	14	68	0.872	4.86
MR	Bryan Abreu	6	4	3.73	66	0	28	9	16	62 2/3	44	28	26	41	80	1.356	1.95
MR	Bryan King*	3	6	5.19	60	1	16	6	12	60 2/3	69	39	35	23	51	1.506	2.22
SW	Kai-Wei Teng	5	7	4.76	30	10	2	0	4	73 2/3	69	43	39	33	73	1.385	2.21
SP	Hayden Wesneski	6	2	3.25	11	11	0	0	0	61	49	27	22	20	46	1.131	2.30
SP	Lance McCullers Jr.	2	3	6.86	8	8	0	0	0	39 1/3	38	32	30	22	43	1.525	1.95
SP	Ethan Pecko	2	0	3.93	7	5	0	0	1	34 1/3	25	16	15	14	23	136	1.64
SP	Ronel Blanco	0	1	6.68	8	5	3	0	0	33 2/3	30	25	25	16	29	1.366	1.81
RP	Bennett Sousa*	1	3	6.00	30	1	3	0	12	30	36	22	20	18	32	1.800	1.78
RP	Ryan Weiss	0	3	7.62	9	2	3	0	0	26	35	24	22	20	30	2.115	1.50
SW	Cody Bolton	0	1	5.40	8	3	4	1	0	20	21	12	12	14	22	1.750	1.57
RP	Nate Pearson	1	0	3.60	16	0	4	1	0	20	16	10	8	12	16	1.400	1.33
SW	Jason Alexander	1	1	9.33	4	2	1	0	0	18 1/3	21	19	19	8	14	1.582	1.75
SW	Miguel Ullola	2	0	2.30	11	2	3	0	0	16 2/3	7	4	4	5	16	0.720	3.20
RP	Alimber Santa	0	1	1.17	10	0	4	0	0	15 1/3	8	6	2	6	9	0.913	1.50
RP	Jayden Murray	0	0	7.43	8	0	2	0	0	13 1/3	19	11	11	7	8	1.950	1.14
RP	Logan VanWey	1	0	1.42	10	0	7	0	0	12 2/3	11	3	2	1	9	0.947	9.00
RP	Colton Gordon*	0	0	11.57	4	1	0	0	0	9 1/3	21	12	12	3	11	2.571	3.67
RP	Christian Roa	0	1	5.19	7	0	2	0	0	8 2/3	10	5	5	7	6	1.962	0.86
RP	J. P. France	0	0	8.10	3	0	2	0	0	6 2/3	6	6	6	5	4	1.650	0.80
RP	Roddery Muñoz	0	0	15.75	3	0	0	0	0	4	7	7	7	6	6	3.250	1.00
RP	Josh Hendrickson*	0	0	3.38	2	0	1	0	0	2 2/3	2	1	1	0	3	0.750	
PO	César Salazar	0	0	9.00	1	0	1	0	0	1	1	1	1	0	0	1.000	
PO	LaMonte Wade Jr.*	0	0	18.00	1	0	1	0	0	1	3	2	2	0	0	3.000	
PO	Jake Meyers*	0	0	0.00	1	0	1	0	0	1	0	0	0	0	0	0.000	
**Team totals**		**81**	**81**	**4.45**	**162**	**162**	**162**	**49**	**88**	**1437**	**1276**	**766**	**711**	**650**	**1411**	**1.340**	**2.17**
Note: 50 IP minimum team qualifier. (Note: No pitcher on this team qualified for league leaders in rate statistics.) • Sources:

==== Postseason results ====
Player	W	L	ERA	G	GS	GF	SV	HD	IP	H	R	ER	BB	SO	WHIP	K/BB
Bryan Abreu	0	0	2.45	2	0	0	0	0	3 2/3	1	1	1	1	7	0.545	7.00
Peter Lambert	0	0	6.00	1	0	0	0	0	3	0	2	2	2	2	0.667	1.00
Miguel Ullola	0	0	3.00	1	0	0	0	0	3	1	1	1	0	4	0.333	
Josh Hader*	0	0	0.00	2	0	2	0	0	2 1/3	3	0	0	0	2	1.286	
AJ Blubaugh	0	1	0.00	2	1	0	0	0	2	0	1	0	3	2	1.500	0.67
Josh Hendrickson*	0	0	5.40	1	0	0	0	0	1 2/3	3	1	1	1	0	2.400	0.00
Bennett Sousa*	0	0	9.00	1	0	0	0	0	1	2	1	1	0	1	2.000	
Hunter Brown	0	1	40.50	1	1	0	0	0	2/3	5	4	3	1	2	9.000	2.00
Bryan King*	0	0	54.00	1	0	0	0	0	1/3	4	2	2	0	1	12.000	
Logan VanWey	0	0	0.00	1	0	0	0	0	1/3	0	0	0	0	0	0.000	
**Team totals**	**0**	**2**	**5.50**	**2**	**2**	**2**	**0**	**0**	**18.0**	**19**	**13**	**11**	**8**	**21**	**1.500**	**2.63**

== Roster ==
2026 Houston Astros
Roster
Pitchers: 52 Bryan Abreu; 54 Jason Alexander; 41 Spencer Arrighetti; 56 Ronel Blanco; 69 AJ Blubaugh; 67 Cody Bolton; 58 Hunter Brown; 50 Mike Burrows; 65 Enyel De Los Santos; 68 J. P. France; 61 Colton Gordon; 71 Josh Hader; 61 Josh Hendrickson; 45 Tatsuya Imai; 53 Cristian Javier; 74 Bryan King; 38 Peter Lambert; 43 Lance McCullers Jr.; 46 Roddery Muñoz; 70 Jayden Murray; 48 Steven Okert; 55 Nate Pearson; 70 Ethan Pecko; 73 Christian Roa; 72 Alimber Santa; 62 Bennett Sousa; 17 Kai-Wei Teng; 66 Miguel Ullola; 64 Logan VanWey; 51 Ryan Weiss; 39 Hayden Wesneski	Catchers: 21 Yainer Díaz; 37 Collin Price; 18 César Salazar; 2 Christian Vázquez; Infielders: 20 Nick Allen; 27 Jose Altuve; 1 Carlos Correa; 29 Raynel Delgado; 28 Brice Matthews; 15 Isaac Paredes; 3 Jeremy Peña; 28 Braden Shewmake; 8 Christian Walker; 14 Shay Whitcomb	Outfielders: 44 Yordan Alvarez; 14 Jorge Barrosa; 16 Zach Cole; 9 Zach Dezenzo; 37 Dustin Harris; 31 Daniel Johnson; 10 Joey Loperfido; 0 Brice Matthews; 6 Jake Meyers; 11 Cam Smith; 28 Lucas Spence; 26 Taylor Trammell; 18 Daulton Varsho; 30 Nelson Velázquez; 31 LaMonte Wade Jr.	Manager: 19 Joe Espada; Coaches: 97 Jason Bell (coach); 85 Javier Bracamonte (bullpen catcher); 23 Dave Clark (first base); 82 Tim Cossins (catching); 91 Dan Hennigan (hitting); 76 Anthony Iapoce (hitting); 99 Tommy Kawamura (strategy); 88 Ethan Katz (pitching); 22 Omar López (bench); 36 Josh Miller (pitching); 12 Tony Perezchica (third base); 47 Victor Rodriguez (hitting)

== Major League Baseball draft ==
Houston Astros 2026 MLB draft selections
Rd.	Slot	Draftee	Position	School	Origin	Signed	Notes	Bio
1	17	Logan Hughes	Outfielder	Texas Tech	(Florida)	Y		
1	28	Jack Radel	Pitcher	Notre Dame	(South Dakota)	Y	(Note: Prospect promotion incentive pick. Qualified by Hunter Brown finishing in top 3 of Cy Young voting.)	
2	57	Wes Mendes	Pitcher	Florida State • 2026	(Florida)	Y		
3	93	Keon Johnson	Shortstop	First Presbyterian Day School	(Georgia (U.S. state))	Y		
4	121	Kam Durnin	Shortstop	Missouri • 2026	(Missouri)	Y		
4	133	Beau Peterson	Infielder	Mill Valley High School	(Kansas)	Y	(Note: Compensation pick for the Detroit Tigers signing Framber Valdez)	
5	153	Gavin Eddy	Pitcher	UC Santa Barbara • 2026	(California)	Y		
6	182	Michael Addari	Pitcher	Illinois State	(Illinois)	Y		
7	211	Bryan Carney	Pitcher	Olivet	(Michigan)	Y		
8	241	Aaron Piasecki	Shortstop	Troy • 2026	(Michigan)	Y		
9	271	Ryan Pruitt	Outfielder	South Florida • 2026	(Texas)	Y		
10	301	Taz Butler	Pitcher	Kansas State • 2026	(Georgia (U.S. state))	Y		

== Awards and achievements ==
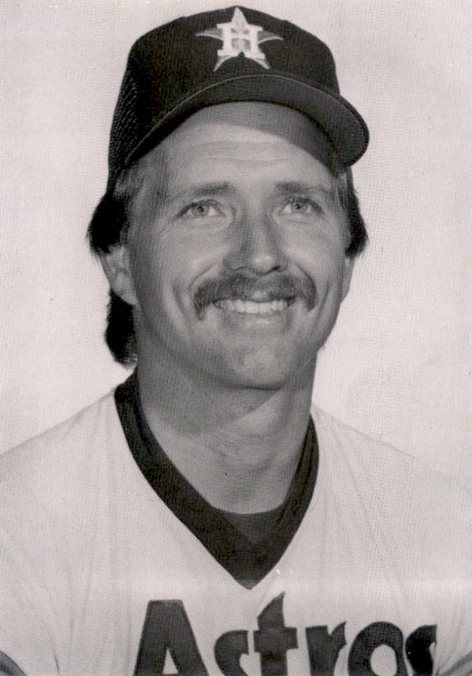
Catcher Alan Ashby shown in 1983

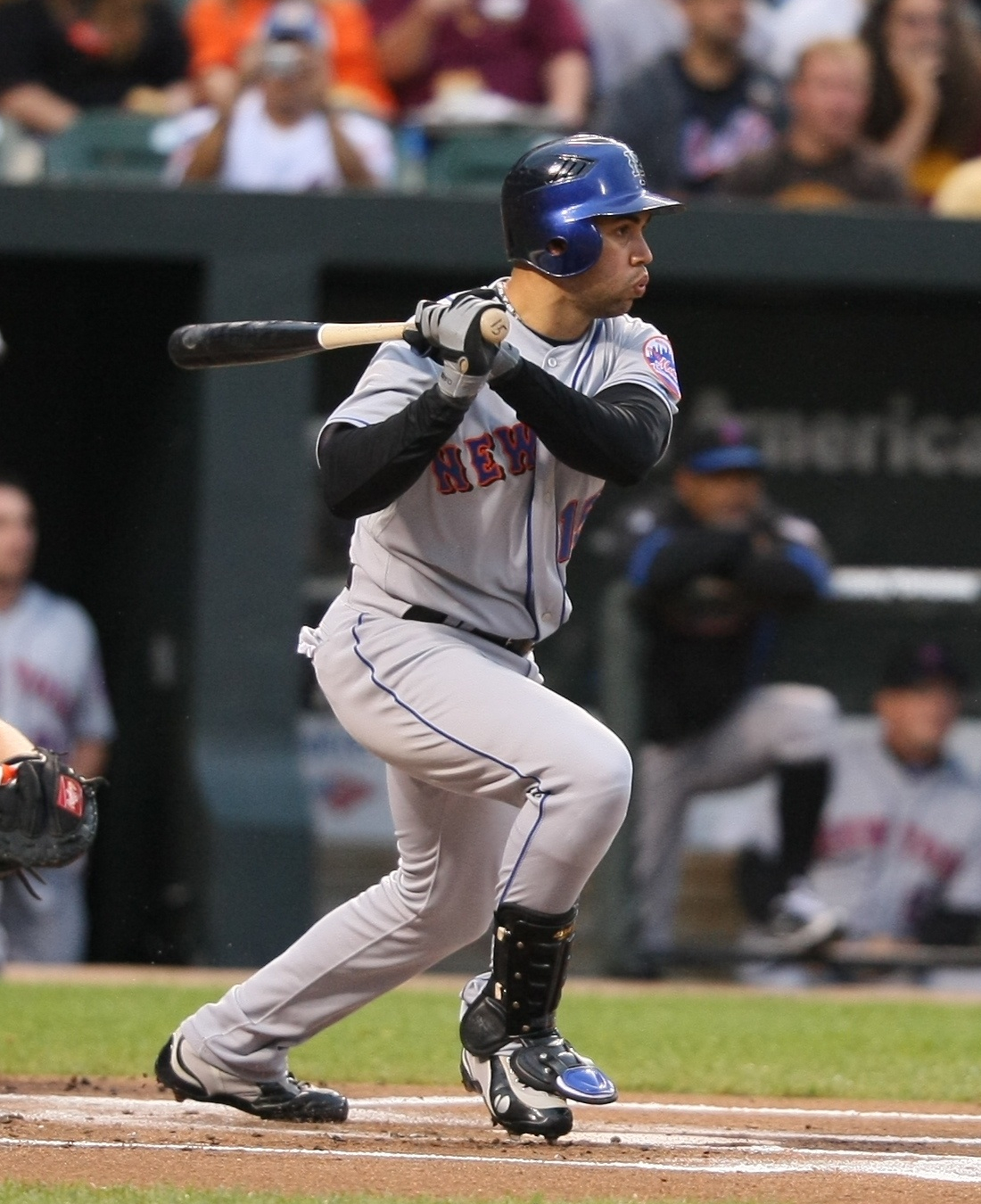
Carlos Beltrán batting from the left side

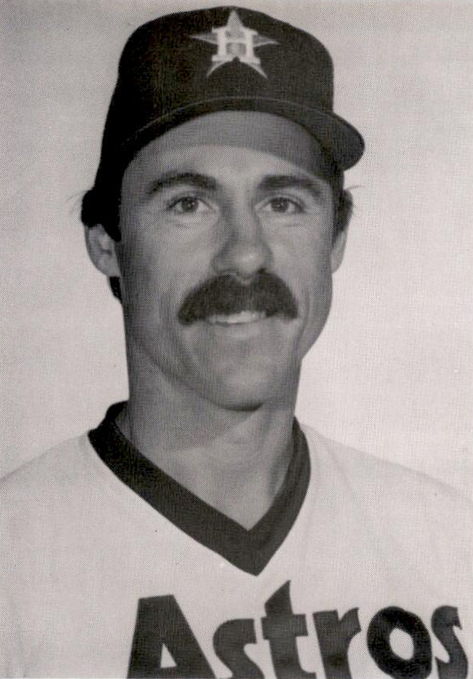
Infielder, coach, and manager Phil Garner

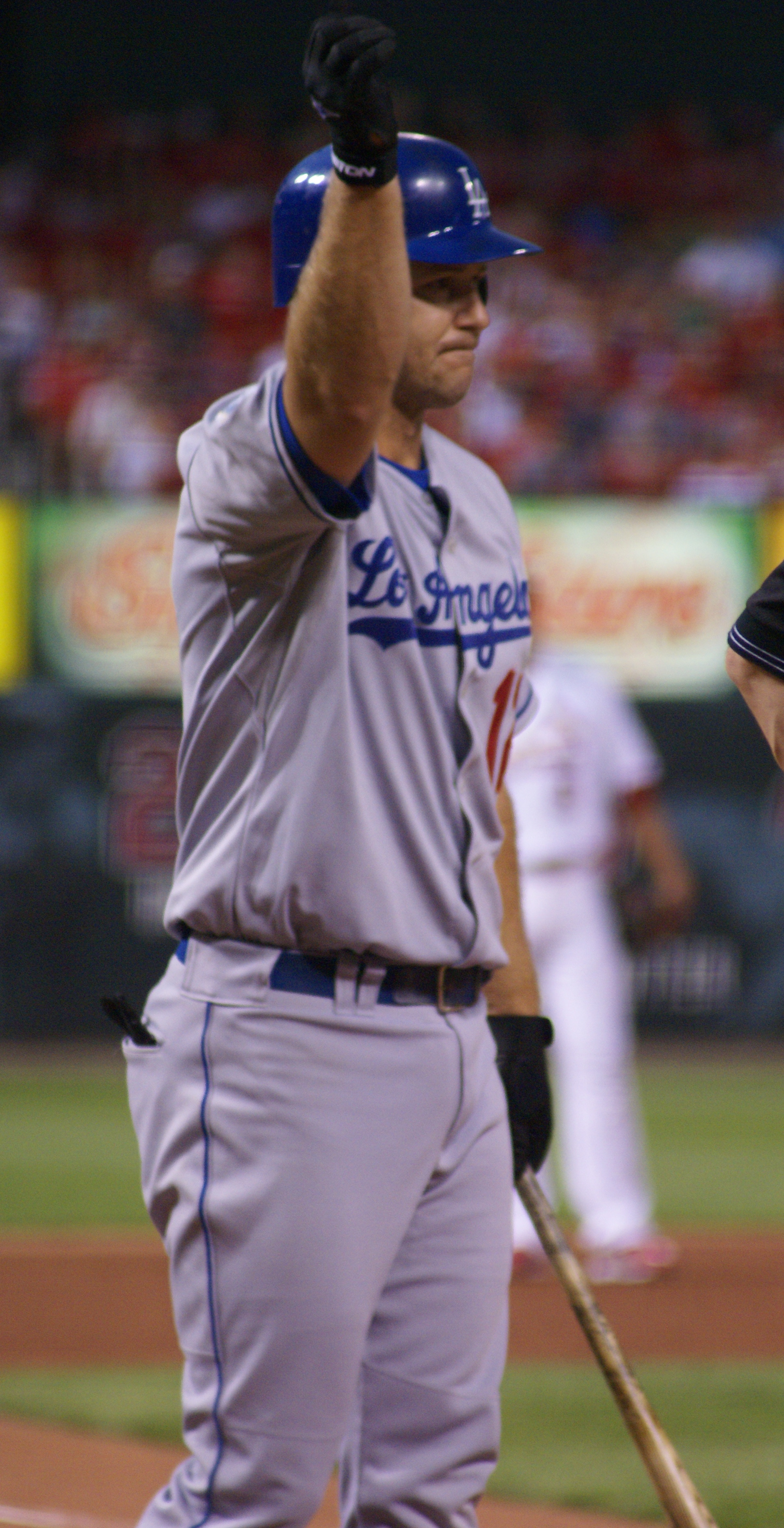
Second baseman Jeff Kent

=== Grand slams ===
No.	Date	Astros batter	Venue	Inning	Pitcher	Opposing team	Box
1	June 6	Yordan Alvarez	Daikin Park	2	Kade Morris	Athletics	
2	June 12	Yordan Alvarez	Kauffman Stadium	1	Mason Black	Kansas City Royals	
3	June 30	Yordan Alvarez	Daikin Park	4 (Note: Tied score or took lead)	Joe Ryan	Minnesota Twins	
4	July 11	LaMonte Wade Jr. (Note: 1st MLB grand slam)	Globe Life Field	3	Kumar Rocker	Texas Rangers	
5	July 20	Jeremy Peña	Daikin Park	2	Janson Junk	Miami Marlins	

=== Pitching achievements ===
==== No-hit game ====
Date	Pitcher	IP	BB	BR	K	Pit.	BF	Catcher	Final	Opponent	Venue	Plate umpire	Box
May 25, 2026	Tatsuya Imai	6	4	4	2	97	20	Christian Vázquez	9–0	Texas Rangers	Globe Life Field	Paul Clemons	
May 25, 2026	Steven Okert	1	1	1	1	15	4	Christian Vázquez	9–0	Texas Rangers	Globe Life Field	Paul Clemons	
May 25, 2026	Alimber Santa	2	0	0	1	24	6	Christian Vázquez	9–0	Texas Rangers	Globe Life Field	Paul Clemons	
May 25, 2026	Imai: Game score: 70 • Win (2–2)												

==== No-hit bid ====
Date	Starting pitcher (IP)	Relief pitcher(s) (IP)	No-hit IP	GS	Catcher	Batter	Final	Opponent	Box
May 15, 2026	Spencer Arrighetti (7 2/3)	—	7 2/3	77	Christian Vázquez	Justin Foscue	2–0	Texas Rangers	
Note: Includes those games started with 7 or more no-hit innings.

=== Career honors ===
Astros elected to Baseball Hall of Fame
Individual	Position	Houston Astros career					Induction	
Individual	Position	Uni.	Seasons	Games	Start	Finish	Induction	
Carlos Beltrán	Center fielder	15	2	219	2004	2017	Class	Plaque
Jeff Kent	Second baseman	12	2	275	2003	2004	Class	Plaque
See also: Members of the Baseball Hall of Fame • Sources:

Inductees into the Houston Astros Hall of Fame
Individual	Role	Uni.	Seasons	Games	Start	Finish	Bio.
Alan Ashby	Catcher	14	11	965	1979	1989	Summary
Alan Ashby	Broadcaster	—	13	—	1998	2006	Summary
Alan Ashby	Broadcaster	—	13	—	2013	2016	Summary
Phil Garner	Third baseman	3	7	753	1981	1987	Summary
Phil Garner	Second baseman	3	7	753	1981	1987	Summary
Phil Garner	Coach	3	3	486	1989	1991	Summary
Phil Garner	Manager	3	4	530	2004	2007	Summary
See also: Complete list of inductees • Sources:

Inductees into the
Venezuelan Baseball Hall of Fame
Inductees	Personnel	Role	Achievement	Ref.
Class	Javier Bracamonte	Coach	As members of 2026 World Baseball Classic championship team	
Class	Omar López	Manager	As members of 2026 World Baseball Classic championship team	

=== Awards ===
2026 Houston Astros award winners
Name of award		Recipient	Ref.
All-MLB Team	First Team designated hitter	Yordan Alvarez	
American League (AL) Pitcher of the Month	May	Spencer Arrighetti	
American League (AL) Player of the Month	April	Yordan Alvarez	
American League (AL) Player of the Month	July	Yordan Alvarez	
American League (AL) Player of the Week	April 5	Yordan Alvarez	
American League (AL) Player of the Week	June 7	Yordan Alvarez	
American League (AL) Player of the Week	July 5	Yordan Alvarez	
American League (AL) Player of the Week	July 26	Jeremy Peña	
American League (AL) Reliever of the Month	August	Josh Hader	
Comeback Player of the Year^{MLB}		Yordan Alvarez	
Darryl Kile Good Guy Award		Bryan Abreu	
Edgar Martinez Outstanding Designated Hitter		Yordan Alvarez	
Fred Hartman Award for Long and Meritorious Service to Baseball		Brent Strom	
Gold Glove Award	First baseman	Christian Walker	
Hank Aaron Award		Yordan Alvarez	
Houston Astros	Most Valuable Player (MVP)	Yordan Alvarez	
Houston Astros	Pitcher of the Year	Peter Lambert	
Houston Astros	Rookie of the Year	AJ Blubaugh	
MLB All-Star Game	Starting designated hitter	Yordan Alvarez	
Most Valuable Player (MVP)		Yordan Alvarez	
Players Choice Awards	AL Comeback Player	Yordan Alvarez	
Players Choice Awards	AL Outstanding Player	Yordan Alvarez	
Silver Slugger Award	Team	Houston Astros	
Silver Slugger Award	Designated hitter	Yordan Alvarez	
The Sporting News	AL All-Star at designated hitter	Yordan Alvarez	
The Sporting News	Comeback Player of the Year	Yordan Alvarez	

Other awards results

Name of award	Voting recipient(s) (Team)	Ref.
Gold Glove	RF winner—W. Abreu (BOS) • Nominee—C. Smith (HOU)	
Heart & Hustle	Winner—Witt Jr. (KC) • Nominee—C. Smith (HOU)	
Manager of the Year	1st—Venable (CWS) • 6th—Espada (HOU)	
Most Valuable Player (AL MVP)	1st—Alvarez (HOU) • 19th—Paredes (HOU)	
Roberto Clemente	Winner—Lindor (NYM) • Nominee—Hader (HOU)	

=== League leaders ===
==== Batting ====
2026 AL batting leaders
Category	Player	Figure	Rank
Wins Above Replacement (WAR)— position players	Yordan Alvarez	6.8	2nd
WAR—offense	Yordan Alvarez	7.2	1st
WAR—offense	Isaac Paredes	4.7	9th
Batting average (AVG)	Yordan Alvarez	.316	1st
On-base percentage (OBP)	Yordan Alvarez	.432	1st
Slugging percentage (SLG)	Yordan Alvarez	.601	1st
On-base plus slugging (OPS)	Yordan Alvarez	1.033	1st
Games played	Yordan Alvarez	158	7th
Games played	Cam Smith	157	10th
Plate appearances	Yordan Alvarez	692	7th
Runs scored	Yordan Alvarez	105	3rd
Hits	Yordan Alvarez	179	2nd
Doubles (2B)	Yordan Alvarez	34	4th
Triples (3B)	Cam Smith	6	2nd
Home runs (HR)	Yordan Alvarez	42	2nd
Home runs (HR)	Christian Walker	29	9th
Runs batted in (RBI)	Yordan Alvarez	106	2nd
Runs batted in (RBI)	Isaac Paredes	94	6th
Base on balls	Yordan Alvarez	109	1st
Total bases	Yordan Alvarez	341	1st
Extra-base hits	Yordan Alvarez	77	1st
Times on base	Yordan Alvarez	299	1st
Double plays grounded into (GIDP)	Jose Altuve	19	5th
Hit by pitch	Isaac Paredes	19	5th
Sacrifice flies	Isaac Paredes	7	5th
At bats per strikeout	Isaac Paredes	6.4	9th
Intentional base on balls	Yordan Alvarez	33	1st

==== Pitching ====
2026 AL pitching leaders
Category	Player	Figure	Rank
Earned run average (ERA) (Relievers)	Steven Okert	2.01	10th
Innings pitched (IP) (Relievers)	AJ Blubaugh	96	1st
Games finished (GF)	Josh Hader	37	10th
Saves	Josh Hader	28	8th
Holds	Steven Okert	21	8th
Strikeouts (SO or K) (Relievers)	AJ Blubaugh	94	6th
Strikeouts (SO or K) (Relievers)	Bryan Abreu	80	10th
Wild pitches	AJ Blubaugh	8	5th
Wild pitches	Bryan Abreu	7	7th
Hit by pitch	Kai-Wei Teng	13	4th
Hit by pitch	Peter Lambert	12	5th
WHIP (Relievers)	Steven Okert	0.82	1st
Strikeout-to-walk ratio (K/BB) (Relievers)	Steven Okert	5.15	3rd
Batting average against (BAA) (Relievers)	Steven Okert	.176	5th
Win probability added (WPA)	Josh Hader	3.4	7th
Championship WPA (cWPA)	Josh Hader	2.7	3rd

=== Milestones ===
==== Career milestones ====
Date	Individual	Position	Quantity	Statistic	Notes	Ref.
March 28, 2026	Christian Walker	First baseman	500th	run scored		
April 4, 2026	Tatsuya Imai	Starting pitcher	1st	win	Previously won 58 games in NPB	
April 3, 2026	Yordan Alvarez	Designated hitter	500th	run batted in		
April 5, 2026	Yordan Alvarez	Designated hitter	174th	home run	Tied-7th with George Springer in team history	
April 6, 2026	Jose Altuve	Second baseman	2,400th	hit		
May 31, 2026	Isaac Paredes	Third baseman	500th	hit		
June 4, 2026	Isaac Paredes	Third baseman	100th	home run		
July 10, 2026	Yordan Alvarez	Designated hitter	200th	home run		
August 19, 2026	Josh Hader	Relief pitcher	500th	game		
September 4, 2026	Josh Hader	Relief pitcher	250th	save	41st reliever all-time	
September 9, 2026	Jose Altuve	Second baseman	2,500th	hit	102nd major leaguer all-time	
September 22, 2026	Christian Walker	First baseman	200th	home run		
September 24, 2026	Lucas Spence	Center fielder	3	home runs	First three in major leagues	
September 30, 2026	Jose Altuve	Second baseman	120th	hit	First player with 120 hits/25 home runs in postseason	

==== Major League debuts ====
Player—Appeared at position

- Ryan Weiss, relief pitcher
- Tatsuya Imai, starting pitcher
- Alimber Santa, relief pitcher
- Collin Price, catcher
- Raynel Delgado, third baseman
- Miguel Ullola, relief pitcher
- Lucas Spence, center fielder
- Ethan Pecko, starting pitcher
- Josh Hendrickson, relief pitcher

Date and opponent

- March 27 vs Los Angeles (AL)
- March 29 vs Los Angeles (AL)
- May 25 vs Texas (Note: During no-hitter.)
- June 4 vs Pittsburgh
- June 14 at Kansas City
- June 29 vs Minnesota
- July 17 vs Baltimore
- August 19 vs Los Angeles (AL)
- September 23 at Seattle
Also:
Box

== Minor league system ==
=== Teams ===
Level	Team	League	Manager
AAA	Sugar Land Space Cowboys	Pacific Coast League	Mickey Storey
AA	Corpus Christi Hooks	Texas League	Ricky Rivera
High-A	Asheville Tourists	South Atlantic League	Nate Shaver
Low-A	Fayetteville Woodpeckers	Carolina League	Carlos Lugo
Rookie	FCL Astros	Florida Complex League	Vincent Blue
Rookie	DSL Astros Blue	Dominican Summer League	Johe Acosta
Rookie	DSL Astros Orange	Dominican Summer League	Carlos Canelon

=== Championships ===
- Carolina League: Fayetteville
- Florida Complex League: FCL Astros

=== Summary ===
Outfielder Bryce Boettcher, whom the Astros selected in the 13th round of the 2024 MLB draft, was chosen on April 25 by the Indianapolis Colts in the fourth round of the 2026 NFL draft as a linebacker from the University of Oregon Ducks football team.

On June 23—the day the Astros' major league club belted three consecutive home runs—Anthnoy Huezo, Xavier Neyens, and Kevin Alvarez of Fayetteville followed suit. The trio achieved the feat during the bottom of the sixth inning off Jason Shockley of the Delmarva Shorebirds to lead a 9–1 triumph at Segra Stadium.

The Woodpeckers claimed their first Carolina League championship since 2018 by sweeping the Charleston RiverDogs in the best-of-three finals, also at Segra Stadium. Ben Tryon capped a 7–4 win in the final game by hitting a first-inning grand slam. Juan Fraide delivered five scoreless innings and struck out six. For the series, Kam Durnin hit .571/.667/.929, doubled twice, scored six runs, hit one homer and collected five RBI.

On September 20, Jason Schiavone purloined his 30th base of the season to join the 30–30 club. He became just the second primary catcher to achieve the feat in professional baseball, and first since Willie Royster in 1981. No major league catcher had achieved the feat. Schiavone hit 26 doubles, 32 home runs, 90 RBI, 32 stolen bases, and.252/.391/.531/.922 combined between Asheville, Corpus Christi, and Sugar Land.

=== Awards and achievements ===
==== Power—speed club ====
30 home runs—30 stolen bases club
Player	AVG	Runs	HR	SB	PSN
Jason Schiavone	.251	106	32	32	32

==== Annual awards ====
- All-Star Futures Game:
  - Kevin Alvarez, OF
  - Xavier Neyens, 3B/SS
- Baseball America Astros' System MiLB Player of the Year: Jason Schiavone (C)
- Carolina League All-Star
  - Shortstop: Xavier Neyens
  - Starting pitcher: Jagger Beck
- Houston Astros Minor League Pitcher of the Year: Bryce Mayer
- Houston Astros Minor League Player of the Year: Jason Schiavone
- Pacific Coast League (PCL) All-Star—RHP: Roddery Muñoz
- Pacific Coast League (PCL) Pitcher of the Month—June: Ethan Pecko
- Texas League (PCL) All-Star—RHP: Bryce Mayer

== See also ==
- List of Major League Baseball batting champions
- List of Major League Baseball career hits leaders
- List of Major League Baseball career saves leaders
- List of Major League Baseball franchise postseason streaks
- List of Major League Baseball no-hitters
- List of Major League Baseball postseason sweeps
- List of Major League Baseball single-inning runs batted in leaders
- List of Major League Baseball single-inning home run leaders
