= Neyens =

The surname Neyens may refer to:

- Xavier Neyens, American baseball player
- Kenny Neyens, Belgian dart player
- Maarten Neyens, Belgian cyclist
