= Miguel Ullola =

Dominican baseball player (born 2002)

Houston Astros – No. 66
- Pitcher
- Born: June 19, 2002 (age 24); Puerto Plata, Dominican Republic
- Bats: Right Throws: Right

MLB debut
- June 29, 2026, for the Houston Astros

MLB statistics (through 2026 season)
- Win–loss record: 2–0
- Earned run average: 2.16
- Strikeouts: 16
- Stats at Baseball Reference

Teams
- Houston Astros (2026–present)

Miguel Daniel Ullola (born June 19, 2002) is a Dominican professional baseball pitcher for the Houston Astros of Major League Baseball (MLB). He debuted in MLB in 2026.

== Career ==
Ullola signed with the Houston Astros as an international free agent on January 15, 2021. He spent his first professional season that year with the Dominican Summer League Astros and Florida Complex League Astros. He pitched 2022 with the Fayetteville Woodpeckers and 2023 with the Asheville Tourists. After the 2023 season, he pitched in the Arizona Fall League.

Ullola started 2024 with the Double-A Corpus Christi Hooks before being promoted to the Triple-A Sugar Land Space Cowboys and started 2025 with Sugar Land. In 28 appearances (23 starts) for Sugar Land, he compiled a 7–6 record and 3.88 ERA with 131 strikeouts across 113 2/3 innings pitched.

On November 18, 2025, the Astros added Ullola to their 40-man roster to protect him from the Rule 5 draft. Ullola was optioned to Triple-A Sugar Land to begin the 2026 season. In his first 20 appearances (including 10 starts), he posted a 1–4 record and 5.48 ERA with 64 strikeouts and one save. On June 28, 2026, Ullola was promoted to the major leagues for the first time. Ullola's full-season totals at Sugar Land included 39 appearances with 10 starts, 4.21 ERA, 1.321 walks plus hits per inning pitched (WHIP), and 90 strikeouts in 66 1/3 innings. On September 22, he hurled two scoreless innings to obtain his first major league win in a 7–0 victory over the Seattle Mariners. He made 11 total appearances for the Astros in 2026, starting two and finishing three. He went 2–0 in 16 2/3 innings, and yielded seven hits and five walks for a 2.16 ERA and 0.720 WHIP, striking out 16. Ullola then made his playoff debut, making one appearance in the 2026 American League Wild Card Series in which he surrendered one run in three innings and struck out four. However, the Astros were swept by the Chicago White Sox, ending their season.

== See also ==
- List of Major League Baseball players from the Dominican Republic
