= Raynel Delgado =

Cuban baseball player (born 2000)

Houston Astros – No. 29
- Infielder
- Born: April 4, 2000 (age 26); Havana, Cuba
- Bats: Left Throws: Right

MLB debut
- June 14, 2026, for the Houston Astros

MLB statistics (through 2026 season)
- Batting average: .243
- Home runs: 1
- Runs batted in: 4
- Stats at Baseball Reference

Teams
- Houston Astros (2026–present)
Medals
Men's baseball
Representing United States
U-18 Baseball World Cup
Gold medal – first place	2017 Thunder Bay	Team

Raynel Delgado (born April 4, 2000) is a Cuban professional baseball infielder for the Houston Astros of Major League Baseball (MLB).

== Amateur career ==
Delgado was born in Havana and moved to Miami at age seven. He attended Mater Academy Charter School before transferring to Calvary Christian Academy. He batted .351 as a senior for Calvary Christian. He committed to play college baseball at Florida International University.

Delgado was selected by the Cleveland Indians in the sixth round of the 2018 Major League Baseball draft.

== Professional career ==
=== Cleveland Indians/Guardians ===
Delgado spent seven seasons in Cleveland's minor league system, reaching as high as Triple-A Columbus Clippers with whom he played the 2024 season and hit .275 with nine home runs and 44 RBI over 93 games.

=== Milwaukee Brewers ===
On November 4, 2024, Delgado elected free agency. He was signed to a minor league contract with an invitation to spring training by the Milwaukee Brewers on November 15. On August 19, 2025, Delgado hit for the cycle with the Triple-A Nashville Sounds. In 125 total appearances for Nashville, he batted .281/.363/.378 with five home runs, 53 RBI, and 40 stolen bases. Delgado elected free agency following the season on November 6.

=== Tampa Bay Rays ===
On November 20, 2025, Delgado signed a minor league contract with the Tampa Bay Rays. Delgado was assigned to the Triple-A Durham Bulls to begin the 2026 season, where he slashed .250/.320/.362 with three home runs, 33 RBI, and 24 stolen bases across his first 61 games.

=== Houston Astros ===
On June 10, 2026, Delgado was traded to the Houston Astros in exchange for cash considerations. Two days later, Delgado was selected to the 40-man roster and promoted to the major leagues for the first time. On June 28, Delgado hit his first major league home run, off Tyler Holton of the Detroit Tigers. A three-run blast, the home run tied the score 3-all during the top of the seventh inning. Delgado appeared in 20 games at the major league level, making nine appearances at second base, seven at third base, and five at shortstop. Across 41 plate appearances, he batted .243/.300/.351 with four runs, nine hits, three walks, one double, one home run, and four RBI.

== See also ==
- List of Major League Baseball players from Cuba
