= Collin Price =

American baseball player (born 1999)

Houston Astros – No. 37
- Catcher
- Born: November 15, 1999 (age 26); Suwanee, Georgia, U.S.
- Bats: Right Throws: Right

MLB debut
- June 4, 2026, for the Houston Astros

MLB statistics (through 2026 season)
- Batting average: .167
- Home runs: 0
- Runs batted in: 0
- Stats at Baseball Reference

Teams
- Houston Astros (2026–present)

Collin Martin Price (born November 15, 1999) is an American professional baseball catcher for the Houston Astros of Major League Baseball (MLB). He made his MLB debut in 2026.

== Career ==
Price attended Mercer University, where he played college baseball for the Mercer Bears. The Houston Astros selected Price in the sixth round of the 2022 Major League Baseball draft.

On June 4, 2026, Price was selected to the 40–man roster and promoted to the major leagues for the first time. He made his major league debut that day, and appeared in seven total games at the major league level, going went 2-for-12 (.167) in 13 total plate appearances.
