= Xavier Neyens =

American baseball player (born 2006)

Houston Astros
- Third baseman
- Born: October 29, 2006 (age 19); Everett, Washington, U.S.
- Bats: Left Throws: Right
- Stats at Baseball Reference

Xavier Neyens (born October 29, 2006) is an American professional baseball third baseman in the Houston Astros organization.

== Amateur career ==
Neyens attended Mount Vernon High School in Mount Vernon, Washington. He played third base and was also a pitcher. He hit .422 with three home runs as a freshman in 2022 and was named the Northwest Conference MVP. As a sophomore in 2023, he played in only 14 games due to an injury and hit .405 with two home runs. As a junior in 2024, he hit .455 with three home runs, 24 runs batted in (RBI) and 20 stolen bases and went 8–0 with a 1.26 earned run average (ERA) and 60 strikeouts as a pitcher. He was named the Washington Gatorade Baseball Player of the Year and the Skagit Valley Herald Baseball Player of the Year. As a senior in 2025, he hit .456 with eight home runs and 27 RBI.

In July 2024, Neyens competed in the High School Home Run Derby which took place in between rounds at the Major League Baseball Home Run Derby at Globe Life Field. He was committed to play college baseball at Oregon State University.

== Professional career ==
Neyens was a top prospect for the 2025 Major League Baseball draft. The Houston Astros selected him with the 21st overall pick in the draft. He signed with Houston for a $4.12 million signing bonus on July 19, 2025.

Neyens made his professional debut in 2026 with the Single-A Fayetteville Woodpeckers. He was announced to play in the 2026 MLB All-Star Futures Game in Philadelphia. He was selected to the Carolina League All-Star team.

== See also ==
- All-Star Futures Game all-time roster
