= 2025 Houston Astros season =

64th season in Major League Baseball for the Houston Astros

2025 Houston Astros
- League: American League
- Division: West
- Ballpark: Daikin Park
- City: Houston, Texas
- Record: 87–75 (.537)
- Divisional place: 2nd
- Owners: Jim Crane
- General managers: Dana Brown
- Managers: Joe Espada
- Television: Space City Home Network (Todd Kalas, Kevin Eschenfelder, Geoff Blum, Jeff Bagwell, Mike Stanton, Julia Morales)
- Radio: KTRH 740 Weekday Night Games Sportstalk 790; Houston Astros Radio Network (Robert Ford, Steve Sparks, Geoff Blum, Michael Coffin); KLAT (Spanish) (Francisco Romero, Alex Treviño)
- Stats: ESPN.com; Baseball Reference

The 2025 Houston Astros season was the 64th season for the Major League Baseball (MLB) franchise located in Houston, Texas, their 61st as the Astros, 13th in both the American League (AL) and AL West division, and 26th at Daikin Park, with this being the first season under the stadium's new name after formerly being named "Minute Maid Park". They entered the season as four-time defending AL West champions with an 88–73 record, and entrants into eight consecutive postseasons, both streaks franchise records, and the second-longest active postseason streak in MLB.

Former relief pitcher Billy Wagner, who spent the majority of his playing career with the Astros, was elected as one of the five honorees to the Baseball Hall of Fame. Wagner became the third player to be elected into the Hall as a member of the Astros, and the eleventh Astro overall. His #13 jersey was retired on August 16.

Making his fourth consecutive Opening Day start, Framber Valdez became the fifth starting pitcher in franchise history to achieve the same. (Note: Preceding Valdez by order of appearance were J. R. Richard (5 consecutive), Mike Scott (5), Shane Reynolds (5), and Roy Oswalt (8)) On April 20, 2025, the Astros played the 10,000th game in franchise history, which resulted in a 3–2 defeat to the San Diego Padres at Daikin Park.

Pitchers Hunter Brown and Josh Hader, third baseman Isaac Paredes and shortstop Jeremy Peña each represented the Astros at the MLB All-Star Game, playing for the American League. It was the sixth career selection for Hader, second for Paredes and first for both Brown and Peña. In the first round of the amateur draft, the Astros selected shortstop Xavier Neyens at 21st overall.

The Astros opened the season on a strong start, going 55–35 (.611) through their first 90 games while mounting a 7-game division lead on July 6. However, the team collapsed in the second-half of the season, as they went 32–40 (.444) in their final 72 games of the season. For the first time since 2020, the Astros did not win the American League West division; it was the first time they didn’t win the division in a full 162-game season since 2016. On September 27, the Astros were officially eliminated from playoff contention for the first time since 2016 following the Cleveland Guardians' 3–2 win over the Texas Rangers, ending the second longest streak in the Majors, and the longest in the American League. The Astros finished with the same 87–75 record as the Detroit Tigers, but lost the head-to-head tiebreaker to miss out.

The Houston Astros drew an average home attendance of 33,677, the 11th-highest of all MLB teams.

== Offseason ==
=== Summary ===
The Houston Astros concluded the 2024 campaign as American League (AL) West champions, their fourth consecutive division title, seventh AL West title, and 14th division title in franchise history, including those won as former members of the National League (NL) West and NL Central divisions. Further, it was the ninth season in the previous 10 in which they had qualified for the Major League Baseball (MLB) postseason, and franchise-record eighth consecutive.

In the 2024 AL Wild Card Series (WCS), the Detroit Tigers swept the best-of-3 set, ending Houston's postseason after two games. The WCS defeat halted Houston's record-setting streak of American League Championship Series (ALCS) qualifications at seven (2017–2023)—the longest in AL history—and the second-longest consecutive LCS appearances after the Atlanta Braves' streak of eight National League Championship Series (NLCS) from 1991 to 1999. (Note: No postseason tournament was held in 1994 as the remainder of the season was cancelled as a response to that year's players' strike.)

==== October—November 2024 ====
On October 14, 2024, it was announced that the Astros would not renew the contract of third base coach Gary Pettis for the 2025 season, concluding a 10-year period with the club. On October 24, the Astros hired Tony Perezchica to succeed Pettis, and to assume roles as infield coach and run prevention coordinator.

Following the 2024 World Series, eight Astros, including Alex Bregman, Caleb Ferguson, Ben Gamel, Kendall Graveman, Jason Heyward, Yusei Kikuchi, Héctor Neris, and Justin Verlander each became eligible to elect free agency and did so. On November 4, the Astros designated right-handers José Urquidy and Oliver Ortega for assignment. Entering his final arbitration season, Urquidy appeared in 79 games and 70 starts for the Astros, going 27–16 wins–losses and 3.98 earned run average (ERA) over 405 innings pitched, and three additional World Series contests won.

The Astros announced on November 18 that Minute Maid Park was to be renamed Daikin Park the following January 1 as result of a new naming-rights sponsorship with Daikin Industries, Ltd., with corresponding changes to the stadium. This partnership between the Astros and Daikin covered the next 15 seasons through 2039.

==== December 2024—January 2025 ====
On December 13, 2024, the Astros completed one of the most significant trades in franchise history, sending three-time All-Star, Silver Slugger and Gold Glove Award winner Kyle Tucker to the Chicago Cubs for infielder Isaac Paredes, pitcher Hayden Wesneski, and third base prospect Cam Smith. Ten days later, the Astros signed free agent first baseman Christian Walker to 3-year, $60 million contract. Walker, who was the winner of the three previous Gold Glove Awards at his position as a member of the Arizona Diamondbacks, had slashed .250/.332/.481 over the prior three seasons.

Left-handed pitcher Billy Wagner was elected as one five inductees for 2025 to the Baseball Hall of Fame in his tenth and final year of Baseball Writers' Association of America (BBWAA) eligibility. Having played nine of his 16 major league seasons in a Houston uniform, Wagner joined his former teammates Craig Biggio and Jeff Bagwell as the third player to have spent the majority of his career as a member of the Astros to be enshrined into the National Baseball Hall of Fame. His 225 saves while with the Astros remained the most in franchise history at the time of induction.

In a separate transaction with the Cubs at the end of January, the Astros swapped postseason saves leader Ryan Pressly for minor league pitcher Juán Bello.

=== Staff and player transactions ===
Coaching responsibilities
Prior title holder	Role	Incumbent	Ref.
Gary Pettis	Third base coach	Tony Perezchica	

Free agents

Major League free agents

Following 2024 World Series
Alex Bregman^{[A]} (3B)	Astros electing free agency October 31, 2024 Contracts expired after World Series	Signed with Boston Red Sox February 15, 2025 3 years, $120 million
Caleb Ferguson (RP)	Astros electing free agency October 31, 2024 Contracts expired after World Series	Signed with Pittsburgh Pirates January 9, 2025 1 year, $3 million
Ben Gamel (OF)	Astros electing free agency October 31, 2024 Contracts expired after World Series	Re-signed with Houston Astros February 5, 2025 1 year, $1.2 million
Kendall Graveman (RP)	Astros electing free agency October 31, 2024 Contracts expired after World Series	Unisgned
Jason Heyward (OF)	Astros electing free agency October 31, 2024 Contracts expired after World Series	Signed with San Diego Padres February 7, 2025 1 year
Yusei Kikuchi (SP)	Astros electing free agency October 31, 2024 Contracts expired after World Series	Signed with Los Angeles Angels November 27, 2024 3 years, $63 million
Héctor Neris (RP)	Astros electing free agency October 31, 2024 Contracts expired after World Series	Signed with Atlanta Braves Marc 3, 2025 Minor league contract
Justin Verlander (SP)	Astros electing free agency October 31, 2024 Contracts expired after World Series	Signed with San Francisco Giants January 13, 2025 1 year, $15 million
Christian Walker^{[A]} (1B) Arizona Diamondbacks	Incoming free agents Contracts expired after 2024 World Series	Signed with Houston Astros December 23, 2024 3 years, $60 million
Waived
José Urquidy (SP)	Designated for assignment November 4, 2024 Declined minor league assignment	Signed with Detroit Tigers March 8, 2025 1 year, $1 million
Oliver Ortega (RP)	Designated for assignment November 4, 2024 Declined minor league assignment	Signed with New York Mets December 8, 2024 Minor league contract with invite to Spring Training
Jon Singleton (1B)	Designated for assignment November 4, 2024 Declined minor league assignment	Signed with New York Mets April 3, 2025 Minor league contract

Minor league free agents
Player	Pos.	Date	Departed from	Gaining organization	Ref.
Wander Suero	RHP	October 11, 2024	Houston Astros	Atlanta Braves	
Glenn Otto	RHP	October 27, 2024	Houston Astros	Houston Astros	
Steven Okert	LHP	November 12, 2024	Minnesota Twins	Houston Astros	
Joe Hudson	C	December 16, 2024	New York Mets	Houston Astros	
Miguel Castro	RHP	December 30, 2024	Arizona Diamondbacks	Houston Astros	
José González	OF	January 2, 2025	Yuba-Sutter High Wheelers (Pioneer Lg.)	Houston Astros	
Blake Weiman	LHP	January 6, 2025	Chicago Cubs	Houston Astros	
Zack Short	IF	January 7, 2025	Atlanta Braves	Houston Astros	
Bryan Lavastida	C	January 16, 2025	Cleveland Guardians	Houston Astros	
Luis Guillorme	IF	February 11, 2025	Arizona Diamondbacks	Houston Astros	
Brendan Rodgers	2B	February 19, 2025	Colorado Rockies	Houston Astros	

Amateur free agents
November 13	OF	Yensi de la Cruz
November 20	1B	Luis Castro
December 4	RHP	José Palacio
December 13	RHP	Álex Santiago González
December 16	RHP	Robier Hernández
December 16	RHP	Juán Martínez
December 16	RHP	Jorman Santana
January 15	SS; RHP; OF; SS; C SS; RHP	Anderson Areinamo; Juan Fraide; Freddy Ramos; Juan Rojas; Emilio Gonzalez; Santiago Martinez; Emilio Payro: RHP Ronald de los Santos; SS Jose de la Cruz; C Emilio Gonzalez; RHP Omar Damian; OF Anthony Millan; C Ire Garcia; RHP Jesus Sosa; RHP Ismael Obregon; RHP Adrian Ruiz; SS Pablo Martinez; C Esteban Castro; SS Eric Mota; RHP Dayerson Cova; OF Kevin Alvarez

Free agent notes

1. Received, and rejected, qualifying offer.

40-man roster moves

40-man roster moves (non-free agents)
Transaction date	Player	Pos.	Move	Gaining organization	Ref.
November 4, 2024	Trey Cabbage	OF	DFA	Pittsburgh Pirates	
November 4, 2024	Seth Martinez	RHP	DFA	Arizona Diamondbacks	
November 4, 2024	Penn Murfee	RHP	DFA	Chicago White Sox	
November 19, 2024	Colton Gordon	LHP	Added	Promoted to major league roster	
December 23, 2024	Grae Kessinger	IF	DFA	Arizona Diamondbacks	
March 27, 2025	Cooper Hummel	OF	DFA	New Yok Yankees	
May 14, 2025	Tayler Scott	RHP	DFA	Arizona Diamondbacks	
May 20, 2025	Brandon Walter	LHP	Added	Promoted to major league roster	
June 8, 2025	Forrest Whitley	RHP	DFA	Tampa Bay Rays	
June 23, 2025	Taylor Trammell	OF	Added	Promoted to major league roster	

Trades

November 4, 2024	To New York Yankees Cash considerations	To Houston Astros Taylor Trammell (OF)
December 13, 2024	To Chicago Cubs Kyle Tucker (RF)	To Houston Astros Isaac Paredes (IF) Hayden Wesneski (RHP) Cam Smith (3B)
January 8, 2025	To Arizona Diamondbacks Grae Kessinger (IF)	To Houston Astros Matthew Linskey (RHP)
January 28, 2025	To Chicago Cubs Ryan Pressly (RHP)	To Houston Astros Juán Bello (RHP)

Arbitration-phase players

=== Arbitration-phase players ===
Arbitration-eligible players
Player	Pos.	Svc.	Yr.	Salary	Free agent	Ref.
Framber Valdez	LHP	5.163	1	$18,000,000	2026	
Kyle Tucker	RF	5.079	1	Traded to Cubs	2026	
Mauricio Dubón	UT	4.162	1	$5,000,000	2027	
Luis García	RHP	4.083	1	$1,875,000	2027	
Bryan Abreu	RHP	4.022	1	$3,450,000	2027	
Chas McCormick	OF	4.000	1	$3,400,000	2027	
Isaac Paredes	IF	3.160	1	$6,625,000	2028	
Jake Meyers	CF	3.044	1	$2,300,000	2028	
Jeremy Peña	SS	3.000	1	$4,100,000	2028	
José Urquidy	RHP	5.049	DFA	Elected free agency	2026 (Note: Under control of signing team through 2025.)	
Also:

Injury report

=== Injury report ===
Injured list (IL) 2025
Player	Role	Injury type	Last active	Return	Notes	Ref.
Lance McCullers Jr.	Pit.	Right forearm muscle strain	November 1, 2022	May 4, 2025	(Note: Subsequently underwent season-ending surgery on June 14, 2023, to repair the flexor tendon and remove a bone spur in his right elbow.)	
Luis García	Pit.	Right ulnar collateral ligament (UCL) reconstruction	May 1, 2023	August 2025		
J. P. France	Pit.	Right shoulder capsular tear	April 23, 2024	August 2025	(Note: Underwent season-ending surgery on July 1, 2024.)	
Cristian Javier	Pit.	Right UCL reconstruction	May 21, 2024	August 11, 2025		
Pedro León	Pos.	Left knee medial collateral ligament (MCL) sprain	August 18, 2024			
Taylor Trammell	Pos.	Right calf strain	February 22, 2025	June 23, 2025	(Note: Simultaneously activated from to IL major league roster.)	
Spencer Arrighetti	Pit.	Right thumb fracture	April 5, 2025	August 6, 2025		
Yordan Alvarez	Pos.	Muscle strain in right hand	May 2, 2025		(Note: Later diagnosed with a 4th metacarpal fracture.)	
Hayden Wesneski	Pit.	Right UCL reconstruction	May 9, 2025	Out for season		
Ronel Blanco	Pit.	Right UCL reconstruction	May 17, 2025	Out for season		
Chas McCormick	Pos.	Left oblique strain	May 30, 2025	July 22, 2025		
Zach Dezenzo	Pos.	Left hand capsular strain	June 1, 2025			
Lance McCullers Jr.	Pit.	Right foot sprain	June 13, 2025	June 28, 2025		
Jeremy Peña	Pos.	Rib fracture	June 27, 2025	August 1, 2025		
Isaac Paredes	Pos.	Right hamstring strain	July 19, 2025			

== Spring training ==
The Astros' opening spring training contests occurred on February 22, 2025, with two split-squad games featured in Grapefruit League play, the first of 30 total. One was a home game at Cacti Park of the Palm Beaches in West Palm Beach, Florida, versus the Washington Nationals—with whom they shared Cacti Park—and the other took place on the road against the New York Mets at Clover Park in Port St. Lucie. The Astros concluded spring training with two exhibition contests against their Triple-A affiliate, Sugar Land Space Cowboys, on March 24 and 25, at Daikin Park.

The Astros began deploying long-time second baseman Jose Altuve in left field in spring training to improve their infield defense and outfield offense. He had not previously made any professional appearances as an outfielder.

The Astros went 16–12 in spring training, good for second place in the Grapefruit League and two games behind the Toronto Blue Jays, and a 1/2-game ahead of the Boston Red Sox.

With the selection of 2015 amateur draftee and infielder Brendan Rodgers (3rd overall by the Colorado Rockies) to the Opening Day roster, he joined Bregman (2nd by the Astros) and Tucker (5th by the Astros) as the third top-five selection from that draft class to have made Houston's major league roster. Rodgers also joined shortstop Jeremy Peña and fellow newcomer Christian Walker (first baseman) as one of three former Gold Glove Award winners in the 2025 Astros' infield.

2025 Spring Training non-roster invitees
See also: Houston Astros minor league players

No.	Player	Pos.	2024 organization	Ref.
84	Jesús Bastidas	IF	Houston Astros	
69	A. J. Blubaugh	RHP	Houston Astros	
65	Aaron Brown	RHP	Houston Astros	
51	Miguel Castro^{§}	RHP	Arizona Diamondbacks	
88	José Fleury	RHP	Houston Astros	
91	Ray Gaither	RHP	Houston Astros	
0	Luis Guillorme	IF	Arizona Diamondbacks	
82	Quincy Hamilton	OF	Houston Astros	
31	Joe Hudson	C	New York Mets	
80	Bryan Lavastida	C	Cleveland Guardians	
86	Brice Matthews	IF	Houston Astros	
76	Jacob Melton	OF	Houston Astros	
47	Rafael Montero^{§}	RHP	Houston Astros	
48	Steven Okert^{§}	LHP	Minnesota Twins	
38	Glenn Otto	RHP	Houston Astros	
81	Miguel Palma	C	Houston Astros	
83	Collin Price	C	Houston Astros	
54	Brendan Rodgers^{§}	IF	Colorado Rockies	
87	Tommy Sacco	IF	Houston Astros	
16	Zack Short	IF	Atlanta Braves	
90	Cam Smith^{§}	IF	Chicago Cubs	
79	Misáél Tamárez	RHP	Houston Astros	
78	Miguel Ullola	RHP	Houston Astros	
64	Logan VanWey	RHP	Houston Astros	
75	Brandon Walter	LHP	Red Sox/Astros^{↑}	
70	Blake Weiman	RHP	Chicago Cubs	
↑—Did not play.				
^{§}	—selected to Opening Day major league roster.			

== Regular season ==
=== Summary ===
==== March—April ====
Opening Series, March 27–29 vs New York Mets: Houston won series, 2–1

Opening Day starting lineup
Uniform	Player	Position	Starts
27	Jose Altuve	Left fielder	13
15	Isaac Paredes	Third baseman	1
44	Yordan Alvarez	Designated hitter	5
8	Christian Walker	First baseman	1
21	Yainer Díaz	Catcher	2
3	Jeremy Peña	Shortstop	4
11	Cam Smith (Note: Major league debut.)	Right fielder	1
1	Brendon Rodgers	Second baseman	1
6	Jake Meyers	Center fielder	3
59	Framber Valdez	Pitcher	4
Venue: Daikin Park • Final: Houston 3, New York (NL) 1 Sources:

The New York Mets and Houston Astros, MLB's 1962 National League expansion duo, had never faced each other on Opening Day in 63 prior seasons. Framber Valdez (1–0), making his fourth consecutive Opening Day start for Houston, (Note: Surpassed Dallas Keuchel (2015 to 17) for most consecutive Opening Day starts by a left-hander for the Astros, and second-most overall in franchise history after Roy Oswalt (2003–10).) tossed seven scoreless innings and closer Josh Hader struck out Juan Soto with two on and two outs in the ninth to seal the Astros' 3–1 win over the Mets. The save was the 200th of Hader's career. In the second inning, rookie Cam Smith—who was making his major league debut—hit an opposite-field single in his first at bat off the first pitch from starter Clay Holmes for his first major league hit. New York won the middle game, catalyzed by Soto's first home run for the Mets, leading a 3–1 score. Soto's blast came off starter Hunter Brown (0–1), who struck out seven over six innings, allowing four hits and all three runs (two earned). In the series finale, Jeremy Peña homered and Yordan Alvarez' tiebreaking double in the sixth—also his first hit of the season—lifted the Astros to a 2–1 win. Hence, the Astros took two of three in the season-opening series. Houston starter Spencer Arrighetti (1–0) yielded a first-inning double to Juan Soto, and just one run with five strikeouts over six innings, in what culminated as the only hit of a combined one-hitter. In the ninth, Hader walked Soto as the leadoff batter before retiring the next three bfor his second save.

March 31–April 2 vs San Francisco Giants: HOU lost series, 3–0

Ryan Gusto made his major league debut on March 31, tossing two scoreless innings in relief. He entered in the seventh inning and retired Matt Chapman with a swinging strikeout, his first in the major leagues. Added to the major league roster to start the previous season's finale versus the Cleveland Guardians, that game was cancelled due to rain and no makeup was played. Led by home runs from Wilmer Flores, LaMonte Wade Jr., and Luis Matos in the finale, the Giants swept the Astros at home with a 6–3 win. It was the first series sweep of Houston by San Francisco since August 28–30, 2012, the last season in which the Astros were a member of the National League.

Jeremy Peña batting.

April 3–6 at Minnesota Twins: HOU won series, 2–1

In Houston's 2025 road opener in Minneapolis, Christian Walker and Jeremy Peña started the second inning with back-to-back home runs, and Brendan Rodgers stroked three hits and three RBI to lead the Houston Astros to a 5–2 win. Hunter Brown (2–0) yielded two runs, five hits, and no walks, with eight strikeouts in six innings, including retiring 15 of the last 16 batters faced. Jose Altuve struck out in all five plate appearances, the first time he had struck out as many times in one game in the major leagues. It was Walker's first home run as an Astro. Altuve bounced back the following game, cranking his 41st career leadoff home run among three hits and no strikeouts. However, the Twins scored 6 times in fourth inning, benefitting from lost command by Arrighetti (1–1) and two errors—include one by Altuve in left field—to win the middle game, 6–1. The Astros won the third game, 9–7, in their first extra innings contest of the year, and biggest comeback for the season to date. In the fourth inning, the Twins led, 7–1. The Astros rallied starting in the fifth inning, totaling eight runs, capped Yordan Alvarez' game-tying 9th-inning home run, his first of the season. Houston scored the final two and game-winning runs in the tenth.

April 7–9 at Seattle Mariners: HOU lost series, 2–1

On April 8, Arrighetti sustained a right thumb fracture after being hit by a batted ball during pre-game workouts at T-Mobile Park, and was placed on the 15-day injured list (IL).

In the middle game on April 8, Cam Smith stroked his first major league triple in the seventh inning to drive home Yainer Díaz. In the top of the 12th inning, Víctor Caratini's RBI single was the game-winning hit for a 2–1 score. Gusto (1–0) pitched the 11th inning for his first major league win and Steven Okert followed with a scoreless 12th for his first save in an Astros uniform. Hader pitched the ninth and tenth as Astros relievers combined for 5 1/3 scoreless innings.

April 11–13 vs Los Angeles Angels: HOU won series, 2–1

In the series opening game, the Astros won with a season-high to date scoring output at 14–3, led by Yainer Díaz' first career grand slam. The Astros scored nine times with two outs. Cam Smith produced each of his first major league home run, double, and stolen base,. Paredes reached base in each of his last 5 plate appearances, including his first home run in an Astros uniform. The Astros, who entered the contest with the majors' lowest team batting average, amassed 16 hits. Díaz' slam was first for the Astros since José Abreu's in a 12–3 win over the Texas Rangers on September 6, 2023.

April 18–20 vs San Diego Padres: HOU won series, 2–1

Rookie Cam Smith connected both of his first career multi-home run and four-RBI game to lead a 6–4 win over San Diego. Both his home runs were surrendered by Padres starter Kyle Hart. In game two, Christian Walker hit a two-run home run and Isaac Paredes delivered the tie-breaking single in the bottom of the seventh to give the Astros the 3–2 lead for good. Josh Hader retired former Astro Yuli Gurriel on a fly ball to end the game for the save (6) and give the Astros their first two-game winning streak of the season. The finale was also the 10,000th contest in franchise history for the Astros. The Padres won, 3–2, to avoid the sweep as Fernando Tatís Jr. homered, tripled, and delivered all three runs for San Diego. The Astros' all-time franchise record stood at 5019–4976–5 (.502) win–loss–tied (W–L–T) following the contest.

April 21–23 vs Toronto Blue Jays: HOU won series, 3–0

In the opener, Hunter Brown tossed 7 scoreless frames with 9 strikeouts, and Forrest Whitley finished the last 2 innings for Houston's second shutout. Jose Altuve hit a two-run double, and Brendan Rodgers collected two hits and two RBI. On April 23, Walker connected for the 150th home run of his career off Bowden Francis and Gusto tossed 5 2/3 shutout innings to lead a 3–1 win.

April 25–27 at Kansas City Royals: HOU lost series, 2–1

The Royals claimed the first two games of the series with back-to-back 2–0 shutout defeats of the Astros. Their first two offensive shutouts of the season, Seth Lugo and Michael Wacha were the Royals' starting pitchers who primarily stymied the Astros. Jeremy Peña, who authored a career-high 14-game hitting streak that spanned April 8–23 starting with a game against Seattle through Toronto, was hitless in the first game against Kansas City. However, in the second game, Peña collected a single and a walk. The Astros avoided a sweep with 7–3 win the finale, as Yordan Alvarez homered in the third inning off Kris Bubic to snap the Astros' 26-inning scoreless streak. Meanwhile, Hunter Brown (4–1) yielded one run in six innings on seven hits and a walk with nine strikeouts, having authored a scoreless innings streak of 28 that ended in the fifth inning when Bobby Witt Jr. doubled home Jonathan India. (Note: The fifth-longest such streak in franchise history, it trailed only Roy Oswalt (32 1/3), J. R. Richard (31), Don Wilson (29) and Darryl Kile (28 2/3).) Brown ended the contest with a 1.22 ERA through his first six starts of the season.

April 28–30 vs Detroit Tigers: HOU won series, 2–1

In the opener versus Detroit, Jose Altuve and Christian Walker both hit two-run home runs, and two errors in the seventh inning by shortstop Trey Sweeney allowed the Astros to tack on four more runs. Steven Okert (1–0) hurled a scoreless top of the sixth inning to earn his first win as an Astro prior to Altuve's home run in the bottom of the inning to give the Astros a 4–3 lead. Christian Walker went 2-for-3 with an RBI double and run scored, and Yainer Díaz hit a go-ahead two-run single in the sixth inning to lead Houston's come-from-behind, 6–4 win on April 29. The Astros called up AJ Blubaugh to the major league roster on April 30, and he made his major league debut that day as the starting pitcher. He yielded a two-run home run to Colt Keith in the second inning and a grand slam the following inning to Javier Báez, as the Tigers won the finale, 7–4. Blubaugh (0–1) pitched four innings and allowed 7 runs, but just 2 were earned after the Astros were charged 2 errors, and he also struck out 6.

Hunter Brown received MLB Central's Pitch Hand Award for April, thus recognizing him as the best pitcher in the major leagues for the month.

==== May ====
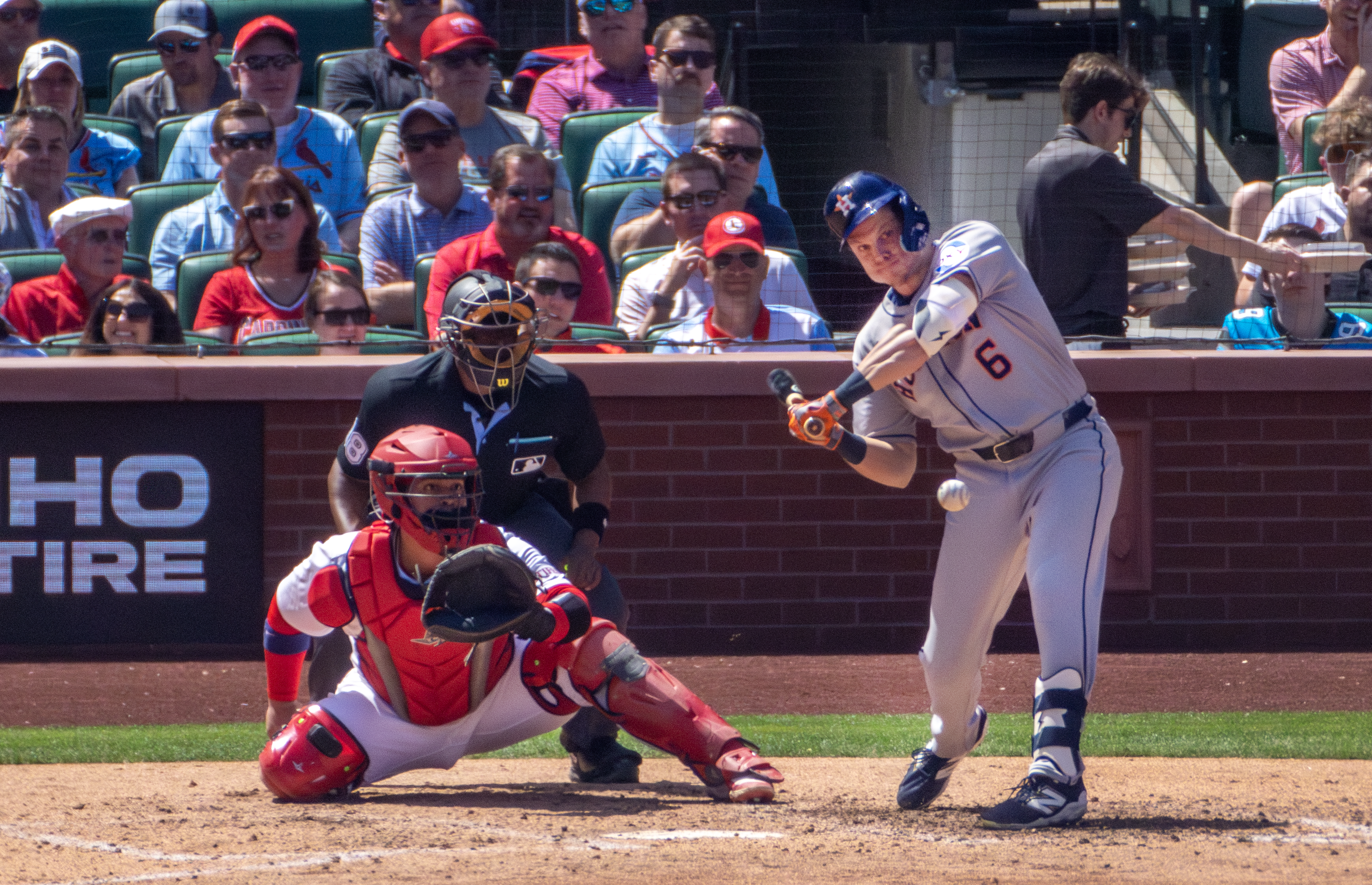
Jake Meyers (right) batting at Busch Stadium in St. Louis in 2025.

May 2–4 at Chicago White Sox: HOU lost series, 2–1

On May 3, Jake Meyers became the first Astro to record 2 home runs, 1 triple and 1 double in a single game to lead an 8–3 win over Chicago. He also tied a club record with 13 total bases and established a career-high seven RBI.

Following a 915-day absence spanning from the 2022 World Series, starting pitcher Lance McCullers Jr. made his 2025 debut on May 4 and tossed 3 2/3 scoreless innings with three hits, three walks allowed, and four strikeouts. Houston took a 4–0 lead; however, the White Sox rallied in the fifth inning. Josh Rojas draw a bases-loaded walk, and Lenyn Sosa followed with a two-run single. As rain began to fall, Astros relievers struggled with command, and the White Sox capitalized in the sixth inning to take the lead, 5–4, just before the contest was called after 6 1/2 innings.

May 5–7 at Milwaukee Brewers: HOU lost series, 2–1

On May 5, the Astros placed designated hitter Yordan Alvarez on the 10-day injured list (IL) due to right hand inflammation based on a small muscle strain. He had last played on May 3 in Chicago.

Jeremy Peña, whose 0-for-3 performance in the second game on May 6 ended a 9-game hitting streak, had featured hits in 23 of each of his prior 24 games played to raise his season batting average from .154 to .281.

Over two innings on May 7, Houston collected five walks, and benefitted from a Milwaukee error and passed ball. Jeremy Peña hit a three-run home run in the sixth to extend the lead to 6–1. Framber Valdez tossed seven innings with three hits and seven strikeouts. The Astros won the finale, 9–1, and the Brewers became the 24th team that Valdez had defeated.

On May 9, the Astros placed starter Hayden Wesneski on the IL due to right elbow discomfort. He had last pitched on May 6 after tossing 80 pitches in 4 innings against Milwaukee.

May 9–11 vs Cincinnati Reds: HOU won series, 2–1

Hunter Brown (6–1) started the series opener against Cincinnati and delivered 5 2/3 shutout innings to lead a 3–0 win. The win was the Astros' first against the Reds since June 19, 2016, to snap a nine-game losing streak to Cincinnati. McCullers (0–1), making his second start since freturning the IL, got just one out while surrendering 7 runs as the Reds scored 10 total in the first inning. It was the eighth time in francise history that Houston had surrendered 10 or more runs in an inning. Víctor Caratini hit a three-run home run as the Astros answered with six runs in the third inning. In that inning, Jose Altuve doubled off Reds starter Nick Martinez for his 700th career extra-base hit, the fourth Astro to reach this milestone with the club. (Note: Altuve joined Craig Biggio (1,014), Jeff Bagwell (969), and Lance Berkman (727).) On May 11, Ronel Blanco struck out 11 to establish a new career high over eight innings and lead a 6–0, two-hit shutout to win the finale and the series.

May 12–14 vs Kansas City Royals: HOU won series, 2–1

In the middle game of the series, Framber Valdez tossed eight innings with one run allowed, and Isaac Paredes' first career walk-off home run clinched a 2–1 final score. This was also the first walk-off home run of the season for Houston. In the finale, Jeremy Peña, who had four hits, singled home the go-ahead run in the eighth off Royals closer Carlos Estévez. Colton Gordon made his major league debut for the Astros as the starting pitcher, tallying 4 1/3 innings with 3 runs yielded.

May 15–18 at Texas Rangers • Lone Star Series: HOU tied series, 2–2

In the series opener, Hunter Brown (6–2) tossed his first complete game in professional baseball, surrendering just 1 run on a Jake Burger home run. However, he was outdueled by eight shutout innings from Jacob deGrom as Texas prevailed, 1–0. In the second game, Christian Walker's three-run home run capped a six-run seventh to lead a 6–3 win over the Rangers, overcome another stellar and scoreless 5 2/3 innings from Nathan Eovaldi, and snap Texas' 6-game winning streak. Lance McCullers bounced back from the disastrous last start against Cincinnati to pitch 4 innings and allow two runs, both unearned. In the seventh inning of the finale, Yainer Díaz' solo home run erased a no-hit and shutout bid of 6 2/3 innings by the Rangers' Jack Leiter. The following inning, Isaac Paredes' 3-run home run off Robert Garcia plated the game-winning run, making starter Framber Valdez (3–4) the winning pitcher. The Astros and Rangers split the series.

The Astros announced on May 18 that Hayden Wesneski required Tommy John surgery and would miss the remainder of the 2025 season and part of 2026.

May 19–21 at Tampa Bay Rays: HOU lost series, 1–2

The Astros won the opener, 4–3, after Jake Meyers connected go-ahead home run (3) in the top of the seventh inning off Rays reliever Manuel Rodríguez. Mayers also walked, had a stolen base and scored on a double by Cam Smith off starter Ryan Pepiot in a 3-run first inning. Colton Gordon, a native of St. Petersburg, made his second major league start for the Astros and yielded 3 runs in 5 1/3 innings, getting 7 strikeouts. Brandon Walter made his Astros debut in the middle game which was also his first major league start. Gordon tossed five scoreless innings; however, the Rays rallied for 3–2 win and Walter received a no decision

May 22–25 vs Seattle Mariners: HOU won series, 3–1

Jose Altuve connected for his 12th career multi-home run game Jeremy Peña tripled in two runs for his 500th career hit in the opener to lead Houston to a 9–2 win. (Note: Peña became the fifth player in franchise history to reach this milestone as a shortstop, succeeding Roger Metzger (839), Carlos Correa (778), Craig Reynolds (767) and Adam Everett (530).) Altuve also set a personal high for the season with 4 RBI. Bryan Abreu (1–2), having remained unscored upon in 18 of his first 20 outings of the season, surrendered the game-tying double to Julio Rodríguez and the go-ahead home run to Cal Raleigh in the seventh inning to blow the save opportunity and take the 5–3 loss in the second game. The following game, Houston scored two unearned runs by capitalizing on two first-inning errors as Jeremy Peña and Christian Walker collected two hits apiece. In the eighth, Abreu struck out Mitch Garver to end the inning with Rodríguez on base. The Astros held on for a 2–1 win. In the finale, Walker hit his first walk-off home run as a member of the Astros for a 5–3 win, a two-run home run, and third career walk-off hit. The Astros took three of four games in the series versus the AL West-leading Mariners.

May 27–28 vs Athletics: HOU won series, 2–0

Jose Altuve homered twice—his second multi-home run game in six days—and produced his 40th career 4-hit game while Hunter Brown rebounded from a rocky start at Tampa Bay to toss six efficient innings and lead Houston to an 11–1 over the Athletics on May 27. The Astros connected for 8 extra-base hits—a season high—including four home runs.

In the second game, Isaac Paredes hit a sacrifice fly, Zach Dezenzo hit a home run and Víctor Caratini recorded 2 RBIs in a 5–3 victory over the Athletics. Starter Lance McCullers threw his strongest outing yet in a comeback bid, reaching season-highs both with six innings and 12 strikeouts, while achieving a quality start for the first time. (Note: McCullers' 12 strikeouts equaled a career-high set on July 6, 2018, versus the White Sox.) In the seventh inning, Dezenzo's homer tied the score at 3 runs apiece. The Astros then loaded the bases, and Caratini delivered the go-ahead, two-run single for the decisive runs that gave the Astros the lead for good. (Note: Prior to Caratini's at bat, the Astros had been 6-for-50 with the bases loaded, accounting for the lowest team batting average in the major leagues so far in 2025.)

As a result, the Astros had won four consecutive games for the first time on the season and were also a season-high 5 games over .500 (30–25).

May 29–June 1 vs Tampa Bay Rays

Jose Altuve and Yainer Díaz each hit a home run. However, Bryan King (3–1) struggled, giving up 5 runs in a 3–13 loss to the Rays. Junior Caminero homered and collected a career-high 6 RBI to lead Tampa Bay, who got five more stolen bases to push their league-best total to 81. Framber Valdez (5–4) tossed an 83-pitch three-hit complete game the following day and his batterymate Yainer Díaz belted an opposite-field a walk-off home run to give the Astros a 2–1 victory. Valdez struck out nine, walked one, and netted a game score of 85. His pitch count matched Darryl Kile for the fewest to a complete game in club history, the contest in which Kile tossed his no-hitter in 1993.

The Rays established offensive season-highs on May 31 at the expense of Astros' pitching, led by Caminero, who hit two of Tampa Bay's season-high five home runs, and Rays starter Zack Littell (5–5) pitched the club's first complete game since 2016 on the way a 16–3 pummeling of Houston. The Rays also tied their season-high in runs and collected another season-high 18 hits. Brandon Lowe hit an RBI double to extend his hitting streak to a career-best 13 games. Jake Mangum hit his first career home run in the sixth. Jeremy Peña homered twice for the Astros.

==== June ====
Outfielder Zach Dezenzo was placed on the 10-day injured list (IL) on June 1 with left hand inflammation, and the Astros promoted fellow outfielder Jacob Melton from the Triple-A Sugar Land Space Cowboys to the major league roster for the first time.

Rest of series vs Tampa Bay Rays: HOU split series, 2–2

The Astros scored an unearned run on June 1 off Taj Bradley in the first inning, Hunter Brown (8–3) tossed six shutout innings, and the Astros held on for a 1–0 win to earn the series split. In the first inning, Christian Walker singled home Jeremy Peña, who had reached on an error in that pivotal first inning. Melton made his major league debut for the Astros, starting in center field, and legged out an infield single in the fifth inning off Bradley for his first major league hit. The Astros, outscored by the Rays by 21 runs, set a franchise record for negative run-scoring differential while still obtaining a series split.

June 3–5 at Pittsburgh Pirates: HOU wins series, 2–1

Lance McCullers Jr. (1–1) and Paul Skenes (4–6) locked into a dominant pitching duel on June 3, with the Astros winning 3–0. Skenes yielded just one run in eight innings, a home run to Christian Walker (8), The 50th win of McCullers' career, it was also his first in the regular season since September 21, 2022, against Tampa Bay. In the second game, Ryan Gusto (3–3) gave up eight hits and three runs, leading to a 3–0 loss. Isaac Paredes homered twice and Jose Altuve hit a sacrifice fly as the Astros won the game, 8–2, and the series. Framber Valdez (6–4) struck out 11 batters in seven innings.

June 6–8 at Cleveland Guardians: HOU wins series, 2–1

Rookie Colton Gordon (1–1) hurled five innings on June 6 at Progressive Field with one run on seven hits surrendered and struck out five to earn his first major league win and set up the Astros' 4–2 win. Two assists by Mauricio Dubón, starting in left field, in the bottom of the first inning to second base prevented both Ángel Martínez and José Ramírez from extending singles into doubles. (Note: Dubón became the sixth player in Astros' franchise history to notch two outfield assists in one inning, joining Brian Bogusevic in a 2011 contest against the Pirates—the most recent—Richard Hidalgo, Jim Pankovits, Cesar Cedeño and Rusty Staub.) In the top of the fifth, aided by opportunistic baserunning from Jeremy Peña, Altuve and Walker hit consecutive RBI singles for Houston to take a 3–0 lead. Peña produced a second consecutive three-hit game to extend a hitting streak to 12 games while pilfering a stolen and Paredes drew three walks and hit a single. Josh Hader shut down the Guardians' lineup in the bottom of the ninth to earn a 17th consecutive save.

Isaac Paredes singled in an insurance run and Jake Meyers scored the go-ahead run on a wild pitch on June 7 to give the Astros a 5–3 win in 10 innings. In the bottom of the tenth, Bennett Sousa struck out Jhonkensy Noel with two outs and runners on first and second to secure his first save of the season and as Astro. Josh Hader (2–0) pitched a scoreless ninth to earn the win. Left-hander Brandon Walter made his second start for the Astros on June 8, yielding two runs in six innings—both on a home run to Bo Naylor in the second inning. Jake Meyers had his second 4-hit game of the season. Cam Smith hit a two-run double in the seventh tie the game at 2. In the bottom of the seventh, Will Wilson laid a sacrifice bunt with two runners on and Astros reliever Steven Okert's (1–2) throwing error led to two additional runs, and the Guardians held on for the win, 4–2.

June 10–12 vs Chicago White Sox: HOU wins series, 2–1

McCullers, facing the White Sox a second time since his 2025 debut one month earlier, struggled with command, surrendering a home run to Luis Robert Jr., who remained hot against the Astros. McCullers (1–2) surrendered four runs, four hits and four walks over five innings to take the loss by a 4–2 score. The Astros got nine hits and three walks, but grounded into three double plays. On June 11, Walker stroked three hits including a home run (9) and Ryan Gusto (4–3) tossed six innings with seven strikeouts and just two runs allowed for his first quality start as a major leaguer to lead to a 10–2 over the White Sox. The Astros, who had entered the contest having scored 15 total runs on the season in the first inning, got three, including Walker's home run. Jose Altuve collected 2 hits to reach 2,300 for his career, the 158th player in MLB history and third Astro to reach the plateau. Framber Valdez (7–4) tossed five innings with 7 hits allowed and 12 strikeouts on June 12. Per Baseball-Reference, this was the first start in club history with 12 or more strikeouts over five or fewer innings. Altuve stroked 2 doubles and Paredes hit a key home run that become in the insurance run and the Astros prevailed in the finale, 4–3.

June 13–15 vs Minnesota Twins: HOU wins series, 3–0

Hunter Brown tossed 7 innings on June 15 with just 2 runs surrendered to the Twins, struck out a career-high 12, and rookie Cam Smith's ground ball single up the middle delivered his first career walk-off hit in the bottom of the ninth for the 3–2 win. Bryan Abreu struck out three in the eighth, Josh Hader (3–0) struck out 2 in the ninth for the win and Astros pitching got 17 total strikeouts. On June 15, Víctor Caratini hit a sacrifice fly in the bottom of the ninth to score Altuve and tie the game at 1. Dubón's single to the left field wall with two outs in the tenth inning scored Meyers for the go-ahead run and second consecutive walk-off win, 2–1.

June 16–19 at Athletics: HOU split series, 2–2

The Astros stroked a season-high 20 hits for an 11–4 victory on June 18, powered by three-run home runs each from Altuve and Caratini. Three hits each came from Altuve, Caratini, Meyers, Peña and Smith. Rookie Nick Kurtz hit two walk-off home runs over the game 4 days against the Astros, and three overall in the series in his team's last at bat. In the first game, he hit it against Bryan Abreu (1–3), and in the final game, against Josh Hader (4–1).

June 20–22 at Los Angeles Angels: HOU wins series, 2–1

Behind a pair of home runs from Logan O'Hoppe and 6 1/3 stifling innings from starter José Soriano, Los Angeles won 9–1 on June 21. Soriano had allowed just 2 runs over his previous 20 1/3 innings, struck out 28, and no home runs over his previous ten starts. Over a six-game span between Sutter Health Park and Angel Stadium, Dubón hit for a power surge, with four home runs, including two on June 22 that were instrumental in 8–7 finale and series win.

On the West Coast road trip that included stops to Anaheim and West Sacramento, California, the Astros went 4–3.

June 24–26 vs Philadelphia Phillies: HOU wins series, 3–0

The Astros tossed consecutive shutouts on June 24 and 25, beginning with Framber Valdez' 7-inning effort to lead a 1–0 win. In the ninth inning, Cooper Hummel hit his first home of the season for the only run of the game. On June 25, Colton Gordon (3–1) and four relievers—all left-handed—combined in a seven-hitter for a 2–0 score. This was the first time for Houston that they had used as many as 5 left-handed pitchers in a single game.

First-half summary: Houston won their 81st game, thus concluding the midway point of the season, with a 2–1 score over Philadelphia for the series sweep while also nearly pulling off a series shutout. The Astros held the Phillies scoreless for 25 consecutive innings until a Brandon Marsh hit a sacrifice fly in the eighth inning. Hunter Brown tossed 7 scoreless innings and struck out 9. The Astros improved to 17–7 in one-run games, while their first-half record was 48–33, at that point a season-high 15 games over .500 and a five-game lead over Seattle.

June 27–29 vs Chicago Cubs: HOU wins series, 2–1

The arrival of the Cubs to Daikin Park signaled the return of Kyle Tucker and Ryan Pressly along with the reunion of Paredes and Smith with their prior organization. Josh Hader's save of the 7–4 win in the first game was the 22nd straight he had converted to start the season, which surpassed Dave Smith's club record for the same type of feat, accomplished in 1989. In the middle game, Tucker homered and had four hits to lead a 12–3 Chicago victory and spoil of Lance McCullers' return from a second IL stint. Smith hit his second home run in as many days to temporarily give Houston a 2–1 lead. Behind Framber Valdez, Houston bounced back in the finale to win, 2–0, and win another home series, taking two of three from Chicago. Bryan Abreu worked through two critical innings, while Josh Hader tossed a scoreless ninth to secure his 23rd save.

The Astros concluded this 6-game homestand 5–1. Playing to a major league-best 19–7 record for the month of June, the Astros improved their record to 50–34, occupied in first place in the AL West with a 6 1/2-game lead over Seattle, while joining the Detroit Tigers and Los Angeles Dodgers as the third club to have reached 50 wins.

For the month of June, Hunter Brown was recognized with the AL Pitcher of the Month Award, while Josh Hader received AL Reliever of the Month honors. Brown's work included a 1.19 earned run average (ERA) with 13 hits surrendered and 39 strikeouts in 30 1/3 innings; he led the AL in ERA and was third in strikeouts. (Note: Brown became Houston's first Pitcher of the Month since 2019, when Gerrit Cole won three times.) Hader, who had won the previous August with the Astros, converted 9-of-9 save opportunities, posted a 1.98 ERA, 4–1 W–L record and struck out 22 over 13 2/3 innings. This was the first career selection for Brown and eighth for Hader.

==== July ====
July 1–3 at Colorado Rockies: HOU wins series, 2–1

On July 1, Víctor Caratini's third career grand slam in the third inning capped a 6–5 Astros win, while Christian Walker was 3-for-4 with a run batted in (RBI). On July 2, Jose Altuve singled in the go-ahead run in the sixth inning for his 2.315th hit to pass Jeff Bagwell and move into second place for most hits in franchise history, trailing only Craig Biggio (3,060). In the second inning, Shay Whitcomb connected for his first major league home run. Hunter Brown struck out Hunter Goodman for the 500th of his career. Brown joined teammate Lance McCullers Jr. as the only Astros pitchers to reach 500 strikeouts within their first 86 appearances. The Astros won, 5–3.

July 4–6 at Los Angeles Dodgers: HOU wins series, 3–0

The Astros won the opener on Independence Day, 18–1, inducing the most lopsided loss at Dodger Stadium in Los Angeles' franchise history. (Note: Was most lopsided home loss for the Dodgers franchise since July 3, 1947, when the New York Giants prevailed, 19–2, at Ebbetts Field in Brooklyn.) Altuve homered twice with 5 RBI, Walker homered among 4 hits and 4 RBI, and Caratini hit another grand slam, two doubles and 4 RBI as the Astros collected 20 total hits, 11 for extra bases. Yainer Díaz homered, Framber Valdez (10–4) struck out seven and surrendered four runs in six innings, and Josh Hader recorded 4 outs to convert his major league-leading 25th save. On July 6, the Astros completed the three-game sweep, their first at Dodger Stadium since May 9–11, 2008. Ryan Gusto (6–3) held the Dodgers to one run in six innings, recent call-up Zack Short had three hits, and Díaz, Altuve and Walker all homered for Houston.

Initial MLB All-Star Game rosters. Astros players selected for the American League squad included:

- Hunter Brown, reserve pitcher—1st selection
- Josh Hader, reserve pitcher—6th selection
- Jeremy Peña, reserve infielder—1st selection

All-Star roster addition:

- Isaac Paredes replaced José Ramírez (CLE)

July 7–9 vs Cleveland Guardians: HOU loses series, 0–3

Cleveland, who arrived in Houston on a 10-game losing streak with 15 total runs scored, swept the series from the Astros, and exceed their scoring output of the entire losing streak. José Ramírez homered in all three games in

July 11–13 vs Texas Rangers: HOU loses series, 1–2

In the opener, Lance McCullers lasted three innings and gave up five runs as Texas won, 7–3. The Astros entered a season-high four-game losing streak. Second baseman Brice Matthews made his major league debut for Houston.

July 14–17: All-Star break

July 18–20 at Seattle Mariners: HOU loses series, 1–2

July 21–23 at Arizona Diamondbacks: HOU wins series, 3–0

Astros rookie second baseman Brice Matthews, who had just made his major league debut on July 11, took over as the offensive star of the series with 3 home runs and 8 RBI. In the second inning of the series opener, Matthews connected for a 3-run home run off Arizona ace Zac Gallen, and added a two-run home in the seventh inning to lead a 6–3 Houston win. Matthews homered the following day to back Astros ace Framber Valdez' (11–4) 7-inning effort, who allowed just one run, as Houston won again, 3–1. Valdez also extended a personal winning streak to 10 games.

July 24–27 vs Athletics: HOU loses series, 0–4

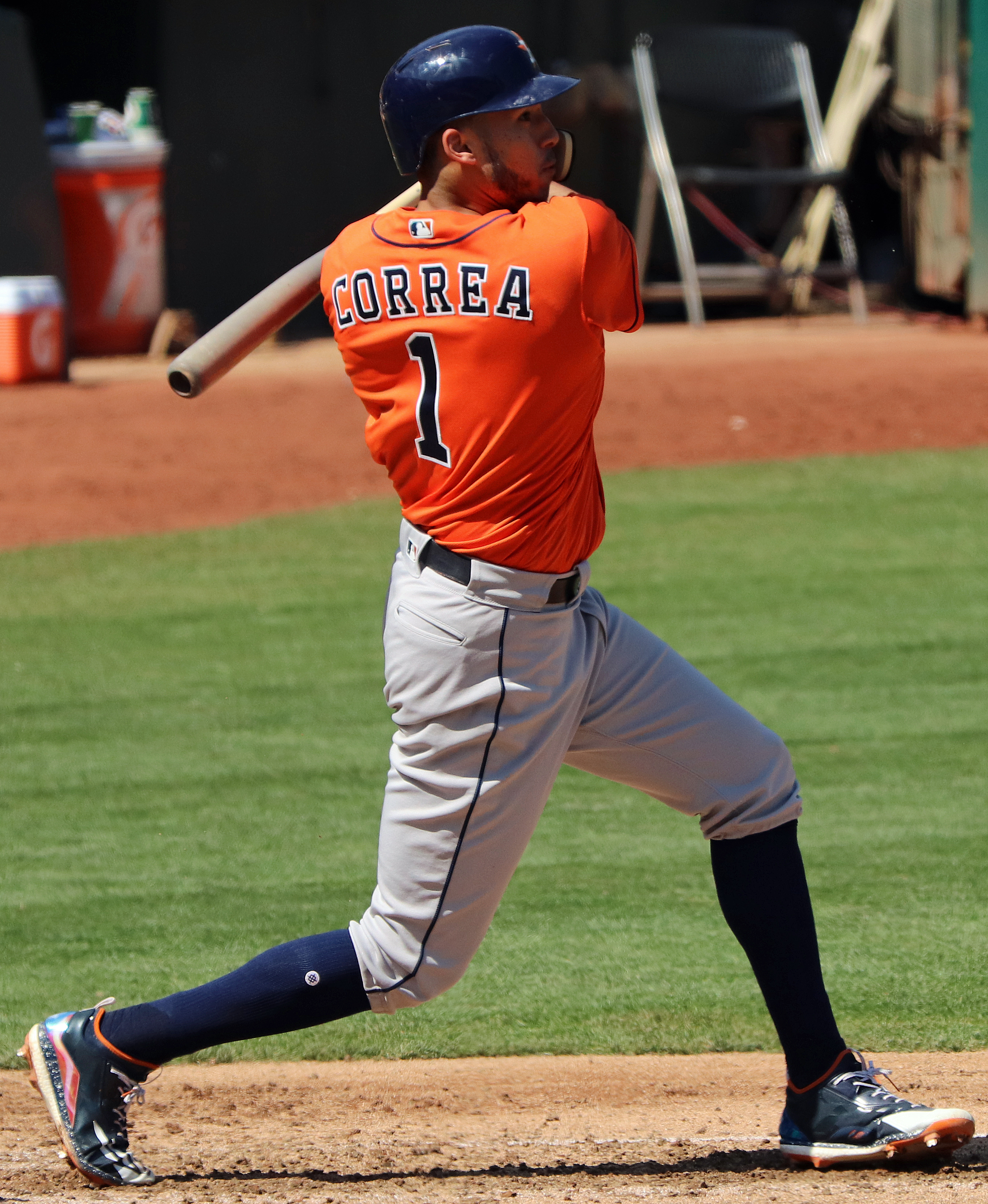
Carlos Correa was one of the Astros' trade deadline acquisitions.

During the July 25 contest, A's rookie Nick Kurtz hit the 20th four home run game in major league history at the expense of Astros pitching, including a record-tying six hits and 19 total bases. Kurtz matched Shawn Green's game in 2002 for the three achievements, becoming just the second major leaguer to do so, while becoming the first rookie to hit four home runs in a single game.

July 28–30 vs Washington Nationals: HOU wins series, 2–1

The Nationals won the finale, 2–1, while Houston lost for the first time in 13 starts by Valdez. He yielded just one run in six innings while tying his season-high of 12 strikeouts. In the third inning, his strikeout of Alex Call was the 1,000th of his career, the tenth Astros pitcher to reach this milestone.

Trade deadline acquisitions. To reinforce a lineup depleted by injuries to starters Yordan Alvarez, Jake Meyers, and Isaac Paredes, the Astros reacquired their former starting shortstop Carlos Correa in a trade with the Minnesota Twins. Houston also traded for left-handed hitting outfielder Jesús Sánchez from the Miami Marlins, and former Gold Glove-winning infielder Ramón Urías from the Baltimore Orioles. With Correa's successor, Jeremy Peña as the Astros' starting shortstop, Correa agreed to move to third base in place of the injured Paredes. By adding Correa and Urías, the Astros had seven former Gold Glove winners on their 2025 roster, including Jose Altuve, Mauricio Dubón, Peña, Brendan Rodgers, and Christian Walker.

==== August ====
August 1–3 at Boston Red Sox: HOU loses series, 0–3

On August 2, Christian Walker recorded his 500th career RBI by connecting for a two-run home run off Red Sox pitcher Walker Buehler in the first inning; Boston took the second game of the series, 7–3. Boston swept the Houston Astros in the three-game set, as Framber Valdez allowed six runs in the finale to take the loss, 6–1, and end a personal 10-game winning streak. The Red Sox did all of their scoring in the fourth inning, taking advantage of several key Astros mistakes.

August 4–6 at Miami Marlins: HOU wins series, 2–1

One of the Astros' recent acquisitions to fill in for their injury-depleted starting rotation, Jason Alexander (2–1), hurled six scoreless innings at LoanDepot Park to lead an 8–2 Astros win in the series opener. Outfielder Jesús Sánchez, acquired from the Marlins just days earlier, stroked an RBI double to open the Astros' scoring with a five-run fourth inning. This performance accounted for the longest scoreless outing of Alexander's career to date. In the finale, Houston nearly overcame a rough return by Spencer Arrighetti, out for nearly four months due to a fractured thumb. Houston went 4-for-13 with runners in scoring position as Miami won, 6–4.

August 8–10 at New York Yankees: HOU wins series, 2–1

Carlos Correa delivered the game-winning single in the 10th inning of the series opener at Yankee Stadium. Former Yankee Taylor Trammell followed Correa with an insurance home run off new Yankee reliever Devin Williams. Over the final two innings, Josh Hader (6–2) shut down the Yankees offense to hold a 5–3 final score and earn the win. In the second game, Trent Grisham clubbed the tie-breaking home run in the bottom of the eighth for New York off lefty Bryan King, before the Astros were shut down in ninth as New York won, 5–4. In the finale, Astros starting pitcher Jason Alexander tossed 5 1/3 no-hit innings before ultimately departing with six scoreless and just one hit and a 4–0 Houston lead. Jose Altuve homered in both the first and third games, including the 250th of his career in the finale on August 10. Thus, he became the 17th major leaguer to reach both milestones of 250 home runs and 300 stolen bases. Correa added a home run in the ninth inning of the series finale before the Astros added two more runs to their lead and won, 7–1.

August 11–13 vs Boston Red Sox: HOU wins series, 2–1

Reunion Day. At Daikin Park, Correa played his first game as an Astro since departing in free agency following the 2021 season, Alex Bregman returned for the first time as a Boston Red Sock, and pitcher Cristian Javier made his return to the major leagues after 14 months since undergoing Tommy John surgery. In his first at bat against former teammate Javier, who last pitched on May 21, 2024, Bregman connected for a two-run home run into the Crawford Boxes for an early 2–0 lead. However, those were only runs that Javier allowed to cross the plate in five innings of work, including retiring 14 of the final 16 batters faced. Chas McCormick, after multiple stays on the injured list, homered in the fourth inning for his first in 11 months. Trade deadline acquisition Ramón Urías' first home run as an Astro provided the decisive margin as Houston held on for the win, 7–6, rendering Javier as the winning the pitcher. Reliever Héctor Neris reached 10 years of service time. They were routed in the middle game, 14–1, but came back to claim the finale, 4–1, led by home runs from Jeremy Peña and Yainer Díaz. Hunter Brown kept the Red Sox' first 3 hitters at 0-for-11 to allow one run over 6 2/3 solid innings.

August 15–17 vs Baltimore Orioles: HOU loses series, 1–2

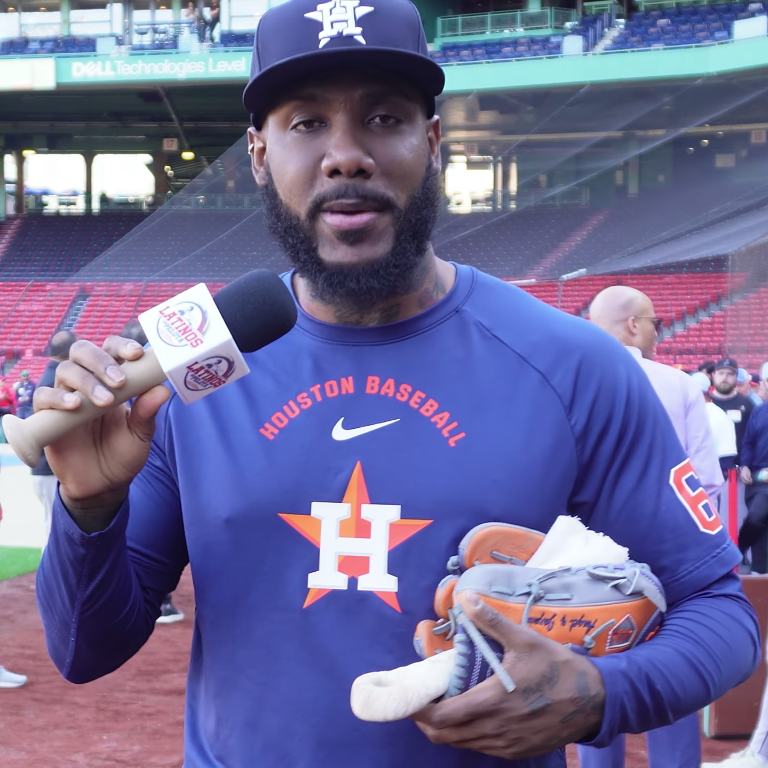
Pitcher Enyel De Los Santos with the Astros

On August 15, Orioles rookie starter Brandon Young tossed a masterpiece, including 7 2/3 innings with no baserunners, just four outs within a perfect game. Former teammate Ramón Urías' infield single spoiled the bid for history. During the eleventh inning of the second contest, Enyel De Los Santos recorded the first-ever two-pitch, three-out, inning. Ryan Mountcastle flew out on the first offering. On the next pitch, Dylan Beavers lined out to Urías at second base, who threw to Carlos Correa at third to tag the automatic runner, Luis Vázquez, and complete the double play. In the finale, Jordan Westburg collected four hits and had a career-high 5 RBI, including a 3-run home run to lead a 12–0 Orioles barrage and series sweep. Starter Dean Kremer extended his mastery over the Astros with seven sharp innings.

August 18–20 at Detroit Tigers: HOU loses series, 0–3

The Astros remained scoreless for the first 28 innings through the series finale at Comerica Park, when Mauricio Dubón homered against former Astros Charlie Morton. The Astros totaled 31 scoreless innings and along with being shut out over three consecutive games, feats not done against them since 1985. However, the Tigers exploited first-inning wildness from Framber Valdez and won the finale, 7–2, to sweep the series.

August 21–24 at Baltimore Orioles: HOU wins series, 3–1

In the opener, Jesús Sánchez snapped an 0-for-29 slump, hitting 5-for-5 to lead a 7–2 win over the Orioles and snap Houston's 4-game losing streak. Yainer Díaz and Christian Walker both had 2-run home runs for the Astros. Walker also homered in a second and third consecutive games to lead Houston to win each of the first three games of the series. In the first inning on August 23, Carlos Correa, Jesús Sánchez and Victor Caratini all homered to post five runs. However, the Orioles answered with three in the bottom of the inning and kept making gains as the Astros scored in subsequent frames. AJ Blubaugh (2–1) delivered four crucial innings from the bullpen and gave up two runs to earn the win. In the finale, Spencer Arrighetti had his best showing since returning from the injured list, including 15 in a row retired following an four hits in the first inning. John Rooney relieved Arrighetti for his major league debut and allowed a run over 1 1/3 innings. However, Gunnar Henderson and Luis Vázquez each cranked home runs for Baltimore, who rode yet another outstanding effort from starter Trevor Rogers to seize the win, 3–2.

August 26–28 vs Colorado Rockies: HOU wins series, 2–1

August 29–September 1 vs Los Angeles Angels

==== September ====
Rest of series vs Los Angeles Angels: HOU split series, 2–2

September 2–4 vs New York Yankees: HOU loses series, 1–2

September 5–7 at Texas Rangers: HOU loses series, 1–2

September 9–11 at Toronto Blue Jays: HOU loses series, 1–2

On September 10, Carlos Correa connected for the 200th home of his career, at the Rogers Centre. The blast, a solo home run during the top of the sixth inning, broke scoreless tie, arriving off José Berríos of the Toronto Blue Jays. This was also Correa's final home run of the 2025 season.

September 12–14 at Atlanta Braves: HOU wins series, 2–1

During his major league debut on September 12, Zach Cole homered on the first pitch delivered to him at the major league level, becoming just the second player in team history to do so, joining Mark Saccomanno. (Note: Saccomano hit his home run on September 8, 2008.) and 17th American League player, succeeding Akil Baddoo on April 4, 2021, as a member of the Detroit Tigers. Cole also succeeded Saccomanno by becoming the fifth Astros to homer in his first at bat. Cole homered off Hurston Waldrep in his first plate appearance during the third inning, and recorded in RBI singles in the next two innings, both instances scoring Christian Walker. Cole totaled four RBI to lead an 11–3 victory over Atlanta.

September 15–17 vs Texas Rangers: HOU wins series, 3–0

September 19–21 vs Seattle Mariners: HOU loses series, 0–3

On September 20, Jeremy Peña connected for his first career grand slam, off Carlos Vargas of the Seattle Mariners during the bottom of the seventh inning at Daikin Park, shrinking the Astros' deficit to 4-to-6. The Mariners held on for the victory by the same score. Framber Valdez (12–11) took the defeat, including yielding Cal Raleigh's 57th home run of the season. Peña collected two hits.

September 23–25 at Athletics: HOU loses series, 1–2

September 26–28 at Los Angeles Angels

==== Performance overview ====
The Astros concluded the season with an 87–75 (.537) record, as runners-up in the AL West, three games behind the division-champion Seattle Mariners. In the AL Wild Card standings, Houston tied with Detroit for identical 87–75 records for the third and final Wild Card position. Because Detroit won their head-to-head matchups, they retained the tiebreaker to qualify for the playoffs and eliminate the Astros. For the second consecutive season, the Astros' elimination involved losing a series to the Tigers following the 2024 American League Wild Card Series. The Astros' second place finish in the division interrupted franchise-record strings of both four successive division championships (second place in 2020) and eight consecutive seasons qualifying for the playoffs (last failure to qualify was in 2016). However, the team continued a franchise-record eighth successive with 84 or more victories, (Note: Excluding the 2020 season which was shortened to 60 games.) with the second-longest string having transpired from 2001 to 2005. The Astros utilized a franchise-record 60 position players this season, and 36 pitchers, also a franchise record.

First baseman Christian Walker led all American League fielders with 1,100 putouts. He became the first Houston Astro to lead the league since Lee May led the National League in 1972 with 1,318.

Setup man Bryan Abreu equaled Brad Lidge for a club-record third successive campaign with 100 or more strikeouts by a relief pitcher, from 2004 to 2006. Abreu also matched Lidge and Billy Wagner (1997, 1999, and 2003) for most total in club history. (Note: Number of seasons player meets criteria, At least 80% games in relief, playing for HOU, in the regular season, requiring strikeouts ≥ 100, sorted by descending instances.) In 2025, Abreu whiffed 105 in 71 innings pitched, yielded a 2.28 earned run average (ERA) and registered a 3–4 record and 7 saves.

=== League standings ===
==== American League West ====
AL West
Team	W	L	Pct.	GB	Home	Road
Seattle Mariners	90	72	.556	—	51‍–‍30	39‍–‍42
Houston Astros	87	75	.537	3	46‍–‍35	41‍–‍40
Texas Rangers	81	81	.500	9	48‍–‍33	33‍–‍48
Athletics	76	86	.469	14	36‍–‍45	40‍–‍41
Los Angeles Angels	72	90	.444	18	39‍–‍42	33‍–‍48

==== American League Wild Card ====
AL Wild Card standings

Division leaders
Team	W	L	Pct.
Toronto Blue Jays	94	68	.580
Seattle Mariners	90	72	.556
Cleveland Guardians	88	74	.543

Wild Card teams (Top 3 teams qualify for postseason)
Team	W	L	Pct.	GB
New York Yankees	94	68	.580	+7
Boston Red Sox	89	73	.549	+2
Detroit Tigers	87	75	.537	—
Houston Astros	87	75	.537	—
Kansas City Royals	82	80	.506	5
Texas Rangers	81	81	.500	6
Tampa Bay Rays	77	85	.475	10
Athletics	76	86	.469	11
Baltimore Orioles	75	87	.463	12
Los Angeles Angels	72	90	.444	15
Minnesota Twins	70	92	.432	17
Chicago White Sox	60	102	.370	27

=== Record against opponents ===
American League

2025 American League record Source: MLB Standings Grid – 2025
Team	ATH	BAL	BOS	CWS	CLE	DET	HOU	KC	LAA	MIN	NYY	SEA	TB	TEX	TOR	NL
Athletics	—	4–2	3–3	5–1	2–4	4–2	8–5	4–2	4–9	4–3	2–4	6–7	3–3	5–8	2–5	20–28
Baltimore	2–4	—	5–8	6–0	3–4	1–5	3–4	2–4	5–1	0–6	4–9	5–1	7–6	2–4	6–7	24–24
Boston	3–3	8–5	—	4–3	4–2	2–4	4–2	4–2	1–5	3–3	9–4	3–3	10–3	3–4	5–8	26–22
Chicago	1–5	0–6	3–4	—	2–11	5–8	3–3	3–10	3–3	8–5	1–6	1–5	4–2	2–4	3–3	21–27
Cleveland	4–2	4–3	2–4	11–2	—	8–5	4–2	8–5	3–3	9–4	3–3	2–4	5–2	2–4	3–3	20–28
Detroit	2–4	5–1	4–2	8–5	5–8	—	4–2	9–4	5–2	8–5	4–2	2–4	3–3	2–4	3–4	23–25
Houston	5–8	4–3	2–4	3–3	2–4	2–4	—	3–3	8–5	5–1	3-3	5–8	3–4	7–6	4–2	31–17
Kansas City	2–4	4–2	2–4	10–3	5–8	4–9	3–3	—	3–3	7–6	0–6	3–4	3–3	6-1	4–2	26–22
Los Angeles	9–4	1–5	5–1	3–3	3–3	2–5	5–8	3–3	—	2–4	3–4	4–9	3–3	5–8	2–4	22–26
Minnesota	3–4	6–0	3–3	5–8	4–9	5–8	1–5	6–7	4–2	—	2–4	3–4	3–3	3–3	2–4	20–28
New York	4–2	9–4	4–9	6–1	3–3	2–4	3–3	6–0	4–3	4–2	—	5–1	9–4	4–2	5–8	26–22
Seattle	7–6	1–5	3–3	5–1	4–2	4–2	8–5	4–3	9–4	4–3	1–5	—	3–3	10–3	2–4	25–23
Tampa Bay	3–3	6–7	3–10	2–4	2–5	3–3	4–3	3–3	3–3	3–3	4–9	3–3	—	3–3	7–6	28–20
Texas	8–5	4–2	4–3	4–2	4–2	4–2	6–7	1-6	8–5	3–3	2–4	3–10	3–3	—	2–4	25–23
Toronto	5–2	7–6	8–5	3–3	3–3	4–3	2–4	2–4	4–2	4–2	8–5	4–2	6–7	4–2	—	30–18

Updated with the results of all games through September 28, 2025.
National League

2025 American League record vs. National League Source: MLB Standings
Team	AZ	ATL	CHC	CIN	COL	LAD	MIA	MIL	NYM	PHI	PIT	SD	SF	STL	WSH
Athletics	1–2	2–1	0–3	3–0	2–1	1–2	2–1	1–2	1–2	1–2	1–2	1–2	1–5	1–2	2–1
Baltimore	1–2	3–0	1–2	1–2	2–1	2–1	1–2	1–2	2–1	1–2	3–0	3–0	1–2	1–2	1–5
Boston	1–2	3–3	1–2	2–1	3–0	2–1	2–1	0–3	2–1	1–2	1–2	1–2	1–2	3–0	3–0
Chicago	1–2	1–2	1–5	2–1	2–1	0–3	2–1	1–2	1–2	2–1	3–0	1–2	2–1	0–3	2–1
Cleveland	1–2	0–3	0–3	1–5	2–1	1–2	2–1	2–1	3–0	1–2	3–0	0–3	2–1	0–3	2–1
Detroit	3–0	0–3	2–1	1–2	3–0	0–3	1–2	1–2	1–2	1–2	2–4	2–1	3–0	2–1	1–2
Houston	3–0	2–1	2–1	2–1	4–2	3–0	2–1	1–2	2–1	3–0	2–1	2–1	0–3	1–2	2–1
Kansas City	2–1	2–1	2–1	1–2	3–0	1–2	1–2	1–2	1–2	1–2	3–0	1–2	2–1	3–3	2–1
Los Angeles	2–1	2–1	0–3	1–2	1–2	6–0	1–2	0–3	0–3	2–1	1–2	1–2	2–1	2–1	1–2
Minnesota	1–2	0–3	2–1	1–2	1–2	1–2	1–2	2–4	2–1	1–2	2–1	2–1	3–0	0–3	1–2
New York	1–2	2–1	1–2	1–2	2–1	1–2	0–3	3–0	3–3	1–2	2–1	2–1	1–2	3–0	3–0
Seattle	0–3	2–1	2–1	2–1	3–0	0–3	2–1	1–2	1–2	0–3	3–0	5–1	0–3	3–0	1–2
Tampa Bay	2–1	2–1	1–2	0–3	2–1	1–2	3–3	2–1	3–0	0–3	2–1	3–0	2–1	2–1	3–0
Texas	2–4	3–0	1–2	2–1	3–0	1–2	0–3	3–0	2–1	0–3	2–1	1–2	1–2	2–1	2–1
Toronto	2–1	2–1	2–1	2–1	3–0	1–2	2–1	1–2	0–3	2–4	1–2	3–0	3–0	3–0	3–0

Updated with the results of all games through September 28, 2025.

=== Transactions ===
Free agents

Player	Pos.	Date	Departed from	Gaining organization	Ref.
Greg Jones	SS	May 20, 2025	Chicago White Sox	Houston Astros	
Omar Narváez	C	June 5, 2025	Chicago White Sox	Houston Astros	
Cooper Hummel	OF	June 6, 2025	Baltimore Orioles	Houston Astros	
Jon Singleton	1B	June 22, 2025	New York Mets	Houston Astros	
Héctor Neris	RHP	July 5, 2025	Los Angeles Angels	Houston Astros	
Craig Kimbrel	RHP	August 22, 2025	Texas Rangers	Houston Astros	

Trades

April 8, 2025	To Atlanta Braves Rafael Montero (RHP)	To Houston Astros Patrick Halligan (RHP) Cash considerations
June 13, 2025	To Tampa Bay Rays Forrest Whitley (RHP)	To Houston Astros Cash considerations
July 30, 2025	To Baltimore Orioles Twine Palmer (RHP)	To Houston Astros Ramón Urías (IF)
July 31, 2025	To Miami Marlins Ryan Gusto (RHP) Chase Jaworsky (SS) Esmil García (OF)	To Houston Astros Jesús Sánchez (OF)
July 31, 2025	To Minnesota Twins Mike Mikulski (LHP) Cash considerations	To Houston Astros Carlos Correa (SS)

== Game log ==
=== Regular season ===
Past games legend
Astros Win (#bfb)	Astros Loss (#fbb)	Game postponed (#bbb)	Eliminated from playoff spot (#933)
Bold denotes an Astros pitcher

Future Games Legend
Home Game	Away Game

2025 Game Log
Total: 87–75 (Home: 46–35; Away: 41–40)
March/April: 16–14 (Home: 11–7; Away: 5–7)

#	Date	Opponent	Score	Win	Loss	Save	Location	Attendance	Record
1	March 27	Mets	**W** 3–1	**Valdez** (1–0)	Holmes (0–1)	**Hader** (1)	**Daikin Park**	42,305	1–0
2	March 28	Mets	L 1–3	Megill (1–0)	**Brown** (0–1)	Díaz (1)	**Daikin Park**	37,004	1–1
3	March 29	Mets	**W** 2–1	**Arrighetti** (1–0)	Canning (0–1)	**Hader** (2)	**Daikin Park**	41,742	2–1
4	March 31	Giants	L 2–7	Hicks (1–0)	**Blanco** (0–1)	—	**Daikin Park**	28,324	2–2
5	April 1	Giants	L 1–3	Webb (1–0)	**Wesneski** (0–1)	Walker (2)	**Daikin Park**	30,314	2–3
6	April 2	Giants	L 3–6	Rodríguez (1–0)	**Valdez** (1–1)	Doval (2)	**Daikin Park**	24,114	2–4
7	April 3	@ Twins	**W** 5–2	**Brown** (1–1)	Ryan (0–1)	**Hader** (3)	Target Field	36,783	3–4
8	April 5	@ Twins	L 1–6	Sands (1–0)	**Arrighetti** (1–1)	—	Target Field	16,082	3–5
9	April 6	@ Twins	**W** 9–7 (10)	**Hader** (1–0)	Varland (1–1)	—	Target Field	14,638	4–5
10	April 7	@ Mariners	L 3–4	Santos (1–1)	**Scott** (0–1)	Muñoz (4)	T-Mobile Park	19,383	4–6
11	April 8	@ Mariners	**W** 2–1 (12)	**Gusto** (1–0)	Hahn (0–1)	**Okert** (1)	T-Mobile Park	22,409	5–6
12	April 9	@ Mariners	L 6–7	Lawrence (1–0)	**Abreu** (0–1)	—	T-Mobile Park	20,556	5–7
13	April 11	Angels	**W** 14–3	**Blanco** (1–1)	Kochanowicz (1–1)	—	**Daikin Park**	34,459	6–7
14	April 12	Angels	L 1–4	Anderson (1–0)	**Gusto** (1–1)	Jansen (4)	**Daikin Park**	36,102	6–8
15	April 13	Angels	**W** 7–3	**Wesneski** (1–1)	Hendricks (0–1)	—	**Daikin Park**	37,032	7–8
16	April 14	@ Cardinals	L 3–8	Gray (3–0)	**Valdez** (1–2)	—	Busch Stadium	21,977	7–9
17	April 15	@ Cardinals	**W** 2–0	**Brown** (2–1)	Fedde (1–2)	**Hader** (4)	Busch Stadium	22,285	8–9
18	April 16	@ Cardinals	L 1–4	Matz (1–0)	**Blanco** (1–2)	Helsley (3)	Busch Stadium	30,360	8–10
19	April 18	Padres	**W** 6–4	**Gusto** (2–1)	Hart (2–1)	**Hader** (5)	**Daikin Park**	41,431	9–10
20	April 19	Padres	**W** 3–2	**Scott** (1–1)	Estrada (0–1)	**Hader** (6)	**Daikin Park**	39,287	10–10
21	April 20	Padres	L 2–3	Jacob (1–0)	**Scott** (1–2)	Suárez (9)	**Daikin Park**	31,940	10–11
22	April 21	Blue Jays	**W** 7–0	**Brown** (3–1)	Gausman (2–2)	—	**Daikin Park**	28,219	11–11
23	April 22	Blue Jays	**W** 5–1	**Blanco** (2–2)	Bassitt (2–1)	—	**Daikin Park**	29,825	12–11
24	April 23	Blue Jays	**W** 3–1	**Gusto** (3–1)	Francis (2–3)	**Hader** (7)	**Daikin Park**	25,209	13–11
25	April 25	@ Royals	L 0–2	Lugo (2–3)	**Wesneski** (1–2)	Erceg (1)	Kauffman Stadium	19,003	13–12
26	April 26	@ Royals	L 0–2	Wacha (1–3)	**Valdez** (1–3)	Estévez (7)	Kauffman Stadium	25,378	13–13
27	April 27	@ Royals	**W** 7–3	**Brown** (4–1)	Bubic (2–2)	—	Kauffman Stadium	21,171	14–13
28	April 28	Tigers	**W** 8–5	**Okert** (1–0)	Flaherty (1–3)	**Hader** (8)	**Daikin Park**	26,395	15–13
29	April 29	Tigers	**W** 6–4	**Sousa** (1–0)	Olson (3–2)	—	**Daikin Park**	28,904	16–13
30	April 30	Tigers	L 4–7	Hanifee (2–0)	**Blubaugh** (0–1)	Kahnle (5)	**Daikin Park**	27,568	16–14

May: 15–13 (Home: 10–5; Away: 5–8)

#	Date	Opponent	Score	Win	Loss	Save	Location	Attendance	Record
31	May 2	@ White Sox	L 3–7	Cannon (2–3)	**Valdez** (1–4)	—	Rate Field	13,866	16–15
32	May 3	@ White Sox	**W** 8–3	**Brown** (5–1)	Ellard (0–2)	―	Rate Field	20,874	17–15
33	May 4	@ White Sox	L 4–5 (7)	Vasil (1–1)	**Okert** (1–1)	—	Rate Field	19,418	17–16
34	May 5	@ Brewers	L 1–5	Myers (1–0)	**Blanco** (2–3)	—	American Family Field	20,306	17–17
35	May 6	@ Brewers	L 3–4	Patrick (2–3)	**Wesneski** (1–3)	Megill (4)	American Family Field	21,075	17–18
36	May 7	@ Brewers	**W** 9–1	**Valdez** (2–4)	Priester (1–1)	—	American Family Field	26,922	18–18
37	May 9	Reds	**W** 3–0	**Brown** (6–1)	Martinez (1–4)	**Hader** (9)	**Daikin Park**	36,857	19–18
38	May 10	Reds	L 9–13	Ashcraft (3–3)	**McCullers Jr.** (0–1)	—	**Daikin Park**	32,335	19–19
39	May 11	Reds	**W** 6–0	**Blanco** (3–3)	Petty (0–2)	—	**Daikin Park**	37,794	20–19
40	May 12	Royals	L 5–7	Wacha (3–4)	**Gusto** (3–2)	Estévez (12)	**Daikin Park**	26,386	20–20
41	May 13	Royals	**W** 2–1	**Abreu** (1–1)	Schreiber (1–2)	—	**Daikin Park**	27,114	21–20
42	May 14	Royals	**W** 4–3	**King** (1–0)	Lorenzen (3–4)	**Hader** (10)	**Daikin Park**	24,641	22–20
43	May 15	@ Rangers	L 0–1	deGrom (4–1)	**Brown** (6–2)	Armstrong (2)	Globe Life Field	28,108	22–21
44	May 16	@ Rangers	**W** 6–3	**Ort** (1–0)	Armstrong (1–1)	—	Globe Life Field	33,035	23–21
45	May 17	@ Rangers	L 1–5	Mahle (5–1)	**Blanco** (3–4)	—	Globe Life Field	38,465	23–22
46	May 18	@ Rangers	**W** 4–3	**Valdez** (3–4)	Garcia (1–2)	**Hader** (11)	Globe Life Field	34,433	24–22
47	May 19	@ Rays	**W** 4–3	**King** (2–0)	Rodríguez (0–2)	**Hader** (12)	George M. Steinbrenner Field	10,046	25–22
48	May 20	@ Rays	L 2–3	Rodríguez (1–2)	**Ort** (1–1)	—	George M. Steinbrenner Field	10,046	25–23
49	May 21	@ Rays	L 4–8	Bradley (4–3)	**Brown** (6–3)	—	George M. Steinbrenner Field	8,596	25–24
50	May 22	Mariners	**W** 9–2	**Dubin** (1–0)	Kirby (0–1)	—	**Daikin Park**	29,512	26–24
51	May 23	Mariners	L 3–5	Hancock (1–2)	**Abreu** (1–1)	Muñoz (17)	**Daikin Park**	34,664	26–25
52	May 24	Mariners	**W** 2–1	**Valdez** (4–4)	Woo (5–2)	**Hader** (13)	**Daikin Park**	35,785	27–25
53	May 25	Mariners	**W** 5–3	**King** (3–0)	Legumina (4–2)	—	**Daikin Park**	35,526	28–25
54	May 27	Athletics	**W** 11–1	**Brown** (7–3)	Sears (4–5)	—	**Daikin Park**	36,143	29–25
55	May 28	Athletics	**W** 5–3	**Dubin** (2–0)	Sterner (1–1)	**Hader** (14)	**Daikin Park**	25,122	30–25
56	May 29	Rays	L 3–13	Uceta (4–1)	**King** (3–1)	—	**Daikin Park**	29,661	30–26
57	May 30	Rays	**W** 2–1	**Valdez** (5–4)	Cleavinger (0–1)	—	**Daikin Park**	32,115	31–26
58	May 31	Rays	L 3–16	Littell (5–5)	**Gordon** (0–1)	—	**Daikin Park**	33,033	31–27

June: 19–7 (Home: 11–2; Away: 8–5)

#	Date	Opponent	Score	Win	Loss	Save	Location	Attendance	Record
59	June 1	Rays	**W** 1–0	**Brown** (8–3)	Bradley (4–5)	**Hader** (15)	**Daikin Park**	33,938	32–27
60	June 3	@ Pirates	**W** 3–0	**McCullers Jr.** (1–1)	Skenes (4–6)	**Hader** (16)	PNC Park	15,891	33–27
61	June 4	@ Pirates	L 0–3	Burrows (1–1)	**Gusto** (3–3)	Bednar (7)	PNC Park	12,359	33–28
62	June 5	@ Pirates	**W** 8–2	**Valdez** (6–4)	Keller (1–8)	—	PNC Park	13,775	34–28
63	June 6	@ Guardians	**W** 4–2	**Gordon** (1–1)	Allen (3–4)	**Hader** (17)	Progressive Field	31,819	35–28
64	June 7	@ Guardians	**W** 5–3 (10)	**Hader** (2–0)	Gaddis (0–1)	**Sousa** (1)	Progressive Field	31,717	36–28
65	June 8	@ Guardians	L 2–4	Smith (2–2)	**Okert** (1–2)	Clase (14)	Progressive Field	23,876	36–29
66	June 10	White Sox	L 2–4	Smith (3–3)	**McCullers Jr.** (1–2)	Eisert (2)	**Daikin Park**	28,950	36–30
67	June 11	White Sox	**W** 10–2	**Gusto** (4–3)	Burke (3–7)	—	**Daikin Park**	28,519	37–30
68	June 12	White Sox	**W** 4–3	**Valdez** (7–4)	Martin (2–7)	**Hader** (18)	**Daikin Park**	28,003	38–30
69	June 13	Twins	**W** 10–3	**Gordon** (2–1)	Paddack (2–6)	—	**Daikin Park**	38,402	39–30
70	June 14	Twins	**W** 3–2	**Hader** (3–0)	Durán (4–2)	—	**Daikin Park**	36,315	40–30
71	June 15	Twins	**W** 2–1 (10)	**Hader** (4–0)	Sands (3–3)	—	**Daikin Park**	39,757	41–30
72	June 16	@ Athletics	L 1–3	Miller (1–2)	**Abreu** (1–3)	—	Sutter Health Park	8,766	41–31
73	June 17	@ Athletics	**W** 13–3	**Alexander** (1–0)	Sears (5–6)	—	Sutter Health Park	8,315	42–31
74	June 18	@ Athletics	**W** 11–4	**Valdez** (8–4)	Severino (2–7)	—	Sutter Health Park	8,803	43–31
75	June 19	@ Athletics	L 4–6 (10)	Kelly (1–0)	**Hader** (4–1)	—	Sutter Health Park	8,670	43–32
76	June 20	@ Angels	**W** 3–2 (10)	**Hader** (5–1)	Strickland (1–1)	**Sousa** (2)	Angel Stadium	29,580	44–32
77	June 21	@ Angels	L 1–9	Soriano (5–5)	**Walter** (0–1)	—	Angel Stadium	32,326	44–33
78	June 22	@ Angels	**W** 8–7	**Gusto** (5–3)	Strickland (1–2)	**Hader** (19)	Angel Stadium	29,154	45–33
79	June 24	Phillies	**W** 1–0	**Abreu** (2–3)	Suárez (6–2)	**Hader** (20)	**Daikin Park**	31,245	46–33
80	June 25	Phillies	**W** 2–0	**Gordon** (3–1)	Wheeler (7–3)	**Hader** (21)	**Daikin Park**	28,826	47–33
81	June 26	Phillies	**W** 2–1	**Abreu** (3–3)	Kerkering (5–3)	—	**Daikin Park**	37,130	48–33
82	June 27	Cubs	**W** 7–4	**Walter** (1–1)	Horton (3–2)	**Hader** (22)	**Daikin Park**	39,451	49–33
83	June 28	Cubs	L 3–12	Rea (5–3)	**McCullers Jr.** (1–3)	—	**Daikin Park**	39,218	49–34
84	June 29	Cubs	**W** 2–0	**Valdez** (9–4)	Taillon (7–6)	**Hader** (23)	**Daikin Park**	37,319	50–34

July: 12–13 (Home: 3–10; Away: 9–3)

#	Date	Opponent	Score	Win	Loss	Save	Location	Attendance	Record
85	July 1	@ Rockies	**W** 6–5	**Sousa** (2–0)	Dollander (2–9)	**Hader** (24)	Coors Field	30,303	51–34
86	July 2	@ Rockies	**W** 5–3	**Brown** (9–3)	Chivilli (1–4)	**Sousa** (3)	Coors Field	30,545	52–34
87	July 3	@ Rockies	L 6–7	Mejía (1–0)	**Weems** (0–1)	Halvorsen (7)	Coors Field	25,151	52–35
88	July 4	@ Dodgers	**W** 18–1	**McCullers Jr.** (2–3)	Casparius (6–3)	**Alexander** (1)	Dodger Stadium	53,377	53–35
89	July 5	@ Dodgers	**W** 6–4	**Valdez** (10–4)	Wrobleski (4–3)	**Hader** (25)	Dodger Stadium	49,744	54–35
90	July 6	@ Dodgers	**W** 5–1	**Gusto** (6–3)	Klein (1–1)	—	Dodger Stadium	41,291	55–35
91	July 7	Guardians	L 5–7	Festa (2–2)	**Gordon** (3–2)	Clase (19)	**Daikin Park**	27,472	55–36
92	July 8	Guardians	L 6–10 (10)	Junis (2–1)	**Hader** (5–2)	—	**Daikin Park**	30,681	55–37
93	July 9	Guardians	L 2–4	Cecconi (4–4)	**Walter** (1–2)	Sewald (2)	**Daikin Park**	27,683	55–38
94	July 11	Rangers	L 3–7	Leiter (5–6)	**McCullers Jr.** (2–4)	—	**Daikin Park**	40,233	55–39
95	July 12	Rangers	**W** 5–4 (11)	**Sousa** (3–0)	Garcia (1–5)	—	**Daikin Park**	39,696	56–39
96	July 13	Rangers	L 1–5	Eovaldi (7–3)	**Brown** (9–4)	—	**Daikin Park**	37,939	56–40
**95th All-Star Game in Cumberland, Georgia**
97	July 18	@ Mariners	L 1–6	Castillo (7–5)	**Walter** (1–3)	—	T-Mobile Park	41,834	56–41
98	July 19	@ Mariners	L 6–7 (11)	Bazardo (4–0)	**Neris** (3–2)	—	T-Mobile Park	31,700	56–42
99	July 20	@ Mariners	**W** 11–3	**Ort** (2–1)	Woo (8–5)	—	T-Mobile Park	33,189	57–42
100	July 21	@ Diamondbacks	**W** 6–3	**Gordon** (4–2)	Gallen (7–11)	**Hader** (26)	Chase Field	20,144	58–42
101	July 22	@ Diamondbacks	**W** 3–1	**Valdez** (11–4)	Woodford (0–1)	**King** (1)	Chase Field	25,650	59–42
102	July 23	@ Diamondbacks	**W** 4–3	**Sousa** (4–0)	Ginkel (1–4)	**Hader** (27)	Chase Field	22,513	60–42
103	July 24	Athletics	L 2–5	Severino (4–11)	**Alexander** (1–1)	Miller (20)	**Daikin Park**	32,386	60–43
104	July 25	Athletics	L 3–15	Springs (9–7)	**Gusto** (6–4)	—	**Daikin Park**	37,700	60–44
105	July 26	Athletics	L 1–5	Sterner (3–3)	**Brown** (9–5)	—	**Daikin Park**	36,212	60–45
106	July 27	Athletics	L 1–7	Ginn (2–2)	**Gordon** (4–3)	—	**Daikin Park**	36,976	60–46
107	July 28	Nationals	L 1–2	Pilkington (2–0)	**King** (3–2)	Finnegan (20)	**Daikin Park**	28,786	60–47
108	July 29	Nationals	**W** 7–4	**Sousa** (5–0)	Chafin (1–1)	**Hader** (28)	**Daikin Park**	35,751	61–47
109	July 30	Nationals	**W** 9–1	**Gusto** (7–4)	Gore (4–11)	—	**Daikin Park**	31,357	62–47

August: 13–15 (Home: 6–6; Away: 7–9)

#	Date	Opponent	Score	Win	Loss	Save	Location	Attendance	Record
110	August 1	@ Red Sox	L 1–2 (10)	Weissert (4–3)	**Sousa** (5–1)	—	Fenway Park	36,881	62–48
111	August 2	@ Red Sox	L 3–7	Wilson (3–1)	**Gordon** (4–4)	Chapman (20)	Fenway Park	36,215	62–49
112	August 3	@ Red Sox	L 1–6	Giolito (8–2)	**Valdez** (11–5)	—	Fenway Park	36,081	62–50
113	August 4	@ Marlins	**W** 8–2	**Alexander** (2–1)	Alcántara (6–10)	—	LoanDepot Park	10,827	63–50
114	August 5	@ Marlins	**W** 7–3	**Blubaugh** (1–1)	Quantrill (4–9)	—	LoanDepot Park	12,186	64–50
115	August 6	@ Marlins	L 4–6	Junk (6–2)	**Arrighetti** (1–2)	Bachar (2)	LoanDepot Park	10,073	64–51
116	August 8	@ Yankees	**W** 5–3 (10)	**Hader** (6–2)	Williams (3–5)	—	Yankee Stadium	46,027	65–51
117	August 9	@ Yankees	L 4–5	Bednar (3–5)	**King** (3–3)	—	Yankee Stadium	45,738	65–52
118	August 10	@ Yankees	**W** 7–1	**Alexander** (3–1)	Fried (12–5)	—	Yankee Stadium	43,658	66–52
119	August 11	Red Sox	**W** 7–6	**Javier** (1–0)	Crochet (13–5)	**Sousa** (4)	**Daikin Park**	39,330	67–52
120	August 12	Red Sox	L 1–14	May (7–8)	**Arrighetti** (1–3)	—	**Daikin Park**	34,396	67–53
121	August 13	Red Sox	**W** 4–1	**Brown** (10–5)	Buehler (7–7)	**Abreu** (1)	**Daikin Park**	31,048	68–53
122	August 15	Orioles	L 0–7	Young (1–6)	**Valdez** (11–6)	—	**Daikin Park**	33,654	68–54
123	August 16	Orioles	**W** 5–4 (12)	**De Los Santos** (4–3)	Akin (4–3)	—	**Daikin Park**	37,641	69–54
124	August 17	Orioles	L 0–12	Kremer (9–9)	**Javier** (1–1)	—	**Daikin Park**	36,411	69–55
125	August 18	@ Tigers	L 0–10	Flaherty (7–12)	**Arrighetti** (1–4)	—	Comerica Park	27,008	69–56
126	August 19	@ Tigers	L 0–1 (10)	Vest (6–2)	**Ort** (2–2)	—	Comerica Park	30,770	69–57
127	August 20	@ Tigers	L 2–7	Morton (9–10)	**Valdez** (11–7)	—	Comerica Park	29,216	69–58
128	August 21	@ Orioles	**W** 7–2	**Alexander** (4–1)	Young (1–7)	—	Camden Yards	18,061	70–58
129	August 22	@ Orioles	**W** 10–7	**Okert** (2–2)	Povich (2–7)	**Abreu** (2)	Camden Yards	24,224	71–58
130	August 23	@ Orioles	**W** 9–8	**Blubaugh** (2–1)	Enns (1–2)	**Abreu** (3)	Camden Yards	30,158	72–58
131	August 24	@ Orioles	L 2–3	Rogers (7–2)	**Arrighetti** (1–5)	Akin (3)	Camden Yards	19,746	72–59
132	August 26	Rockies	L 1–6	Gordon (5–5)	**Brown** (10–6)	—	**Daikin Park**	35,433	72–60
133	August 27	Rockies	**W** 4–0	**Valdez** (12–7)	Dollander (2–11)	—	**Daikin Park**	28,338	73–60
134	August 28	Rockies	**W** 4–3	**King** (4–3)	Peralta (1–2)	**Abreu** (4)	**Daikin Park**	29,523	74–60
135	August 29	Angels	**W** 2–0	**De Los Santos** (5–3)	García (2–1)	**Ort** (1)	**Daikin Park**	33,841	75–60
136	August 30	Angels	L 1–4	Fermín (3–2)	**Abreu** (3–4)	Jansen (24)	**Daikin Park**	38,559	75–61
137	August 31	Angels	L 0–3	Soriano (10–9)	**Brown** (10–7)	Jansen (25)	**Daikin Park**	36,811	75–62

September: 12–13 (Home: 5–5; Away: 7–8)

#	Date	Opponent	Score	Win	Loss	Save	Location	Attendance	Record
138	September 1	Angels	**W** 8–3	**García** (1–0)	Kikuchi (6–10)	—	**Daikin Park**	33,247	76–62
139	September 2	Yankees	L 1–7	Fried (15–5)	**Valdez** (12–8)	—	**Daikin Park**	33,133	76–63
140	September 3	Yankees	**W** 8–7	**King** (5–3)	Williams (3–6)	—	**Daikin Park**	30,693	77–63
141	September 4	Yankees	L 4–8	Rodón (16–7)	**Javier** (1–2)	—	**Daikin Park**	35,019	77–64
142	September 5	@ Rangers	L 3–4 (12)	Garcia (3–7)	**McCullers Jr.** (2–5)	—	Globe Life Field	31,662	77–65
143	September 6	@ Rangers	**W** 11–0	**Brown** (11–7)	deGrom (11–7)	—	Globe Life Field	38,332	78–65
144	September 7	@ Rangers	L 2–4	Maton (3–5)	**Valdez** (12–9)	Armstrong (7)	Globe Life Field	35,449	78–66
145	September 9	@ Blue Jays	L 3–4 (10)	Hoffman (9–6)	**Kimbrel** (0–1)	—	Rogers Centre	40,252	78–67
146	September 10	@ Blue Jays	**W** 3–2	**De Los Santos** (6–3)	Hoffman (9–7)	**Abreu** (5)	Rogers Centre	36,760	79–67
147	September 11	@ Blue Jays	L 0–6	Gausman (10–10)	**Javier** (1–3)	—	Rogers Centre	41,224	79–68
148	September 12	@ Braves	**W** 11–3	**Blubaugh** (3–1)	Waldrep (4–1)	**Gordon** (1)	Truist Park	34,030	80–68
149	September 13	@ Braves	**W** 6–2	**Brown** (12–7)	Elder (7–10)	—	Truist Park	36,826	81–68
150	September 14	@ Braves	L 3–8	Stratton (1–1)	**Valdez** (12–10)	—	Truist Park	32,807	81–69
151	September 15	Rangers	**W** 6–3	**Okert** (3–2)	Leiter (9–9)	**Abreu** (6)	**Daikin Park**	30,484	82–69
152	September 16	Rangers	**W** 6–5	**Gordon** (5–4)	Kelly (12–8)	**Abreu** (7)	**Daikin Park**	35,026	83–69
153	September 17	Rangers	**W** 5–2	**Javier** (2–3)	deGrom (12–8)	**King** (2)	**Daikin Park**	33,084	84–69
154	September 19	Mariners	L 0–4	Woo (15–7)	**Brown** (12–8)	—	**Daikin Park**	41,471	84–70
155	September 20	Mariners	L 4–6	Kirby (10–7)	**Valdez** (12–11)	Muñoz (37)	**Daikin Park**	42,065	84–71
156	September 21	Mariners	L 3–7	Gilbert (6–6)	**Alexander** (4–2)	—	**Daikin Park**	41,893	84–72
157	September 23	@ Athletics	L 1–5	Springs (11–11)	**Javier** (2–4)	—	Sutter Health Park	9,465	84–73
158	September 24	@ Athletics	L 0–6	Severino (8–11)	**Brown** (12–9)	—	Sutter Health Park	9,753	84–74
159	September 25	@ Athletics	**W** 11–5	**Valdez** (13–11)	Ginn (4–7)	—	Sutter Health Park	8,293	85–74
160	September 26	@ Angels	L 3–4	Burke (7–1)	**King** (5–4)	Jansen (29)	Angel Stadium	37,448	85–75
161	September 27	@ Angels	**W** 6–1	**France** (1–0)	Dana (0–4)	—	Angel Stadium	36,487	86–75
162	September 28	@ Angels	**W** 6–2	**Gordon** (6–4)	Aldegheri (0–2)	—	Angel Stadium	30,609	87–75

== Roster ==
2025 Houston Astros
Roster
Pitchers: 52 Bryan Abreu; 54 Jason Alexander; 41 Spencer Arrighetti; 56 Ronel Blanco; 69 AJ Blubaugh; 58 Hunter Brown; 73 Luis Contreras; 65 Enyel De Los Santos; 66 Shawn Dubin; 68 J. P. France; 77 Luis García; 61 Colton Gordon; 67 Ryan Gusto; 71 Josh Hader; 72 Nick Hernandez; 53 Cristian Javier; 46 Craig Kimbrel; 74 Bryan King; 43 Lance McCullers Jr.; 47 Rafael Montero; 70 Jayden Murray; 50 Héctor Neris; 48 Steven Okert; 63 Kaleb Ort; 67 John Rooney; 50 Tayler Scott; 62 Bennett Sousa; 59 Framber Valdez; 64 Logan VanWey; 60 Brandon Walter; 51 Jordan Weems; 39 Hayden Wesneski; 55 Forrest Whitley	Catchers: 17 Víctor Caratini; 21 Yainer Díaz; 18 César Salazar; Infielders: 27 Jose Altuve; 1 Carlos Correa; 14 Mauricio Dubón; 0 Luis Guillorme; 28 Brice Matthews; 15 Isaac Paredes; 3 Jeremy Peña; 1 Brendan Rodgers; 38 Zack Short; 35 Jon Singleton; 29 Ramón Urías; 8 Christian Walker; 10 Shay Whitcomb	Outfielders: 44 Yordan Alvarez; 16 Zach Cole; 47 Kenedy Corona; 9 Zach Dezenzo; 16 Cooper Hummel; 20 Chas McCormick; 31 Jacob Melton; 6 Jake Meyers; 4 Jesús Sánchez; 11 Cam Smith; 26 Taylor Trammell	Manager: 19 Joe Espada; Coaches: 97 Jason Bell (coach); 85 Javier Bracamonte (bullpen catcher); 37 Alex Cintrón (hitting); 23 Dave Clark (first base); 29 Michael Collins (coach); 99 Tommy Kawamura (major league coach); 22 Omar López (bench); 36 Josh Miller (pitching); 95 Bill Murphy (bullpen); 12 Tony Perezchica (third base); 46 Troy Snitker (hitting)

== Major League Baseball draft ==
The Astros were ranked number 21 in the draft selection order. Though the Boston Red Sox signed Alex Bregman, the Astros concurrently forfeited a second-round selection and a compensation pick after the fourth round due to signing a free agent who had received a qualifying offer—Christian Walker—and their status as a club that paid luxury tax penalties for the 2024 season.

Houston Astros 2025 MLB draft selections
Rd.	Slot	Draftee	Position	School	Origin	Signed	Notes	Bio
1	21	Xavier Neyens	Shortstop	Mount Vernon High School	(Washington (state))	Y		
2	None						(Note: Forfeited due to signing Christian Walker, who declined qualifying offer from the Arizona Diamondbacks.)	
3	95	Ethan Frey	Outfielder	Louisiana State · 2025	(Louisiana)	Y		
4	126	Nick Monistere	Infielder	Southern Mississippi · 2025	(Texas)	Y		
5	156	Nick Potter	Right-handed pitcher	Wichita State	(Missouri)	Y		
6	186	Gabel Pentecost	Right-handed pitcher	Taylor University	(Indiana)	Y		
7	216	Jase Mitchell	Catcher	Cape Henlopen HS	(Delaware)	Y		
8	246	Kyle Walker	Second baseman	Arizona State	(Illinois)	Y		
9	276	Kellen Oakes	Right-handed pitcher	Oregon State ⋅ 2025	(Oregon)	Y		
10	306	Zach Daudet	Shortstop	Cal State Polytechnic	(California)	Y		

== Player statistics ==
Table legend
*	Left-handed batter or pitcher	League leader (Bold: MLB leader)
#	Switch hitter	League top ten
	Leader in appearances at position	Team leader

=== Batting ===
Statistics legend
⌖	Position	AB	At bats	2B	Doubles	RBI	Runs batted in	SB	Stolen bases	SLG	Slugging percentage
G	Games played	R	Runs scored	3B	Triples	BB	Bases on balls	AVG	Batting average	OPS	On-base plus slugging percentage
PA	Plate appearances	H	Hits	HR	Home runs	SO	Strikeouts	OBP	On-base percentage

Individual batting results
⌖	Player	G	AB	R	H	2B	3B	HR	RBI	SB	BB	SO	AVG	OBP	SLG
C	Yainer Díaz	143	542	56	139	25	1	20	70	1	20	95	.256	.284	.417
1B	Christian Walker	154	585	72	139	24	1	27	88	2	40	177	.238	.297	.421
2B	Jose Altuve	155	588	80	156	24	1	26	77	10	55	109	.265	.329	.442
3B	Isaac Paredes	102	378	53	96	15	1	20	53	0	50	76	.254	.352	.458
SS	Jeremy Peña	125	493	68	150	30	2	17	62	20	35	93	.304	.363	.477
LF	Cooper Hummel^{#}	36	87	10	15	0	0	3	7	1	14	30	.172	.301	.276
CF	Jake Meyers	104	343	53	100	15	2	3	24	16	31	67	.292	.334	.373
RF	Cam Smith	134	441	55	104	21	3	9	51	8	43	137	.236	.312	.358
DH	Yordan Alvarez*	48	165	17	45	8	0	6	27	1	28	33	.273	.367	.430
UT	Mauricio Dubón	133	369	43	89	21	0	7	33	3	24	42	.241	.289	.355
C	Victor Caratini^{#}	114	344	35	89	14	0	12	46	1	23	65	.259	.324	.404
3B	Carlos Correa	51	200	23	58	10	0	6	21	0	19	45	.290	.355	.430
OF	Jesús Sánchez*	48	146	21	29	9	0	4	12	4	13	40	.199	.269	.342
OF	Taylor Trammell*	52	117	15	23	7	0	3	12	3	17	41	.197	.296	.333
2B	Brendan Rodgers	43	115	12	22	4	0	2	11	0	11	46	.191	.266	.278
CF	Chas McCormick	64	100	13	21	5	0	1	5	2	9	31	.210	.279	.290
OF	Zach Dezenzo	34	98	17	24	6	0	2	10	1	11	37	.245	.321	.367
2B	Ramón Urías	35	94	6	21	5	0	3	10	1	6	28	.223	.267	.372
OF	Jacob Melton*	32	70	7	11	0	1	0	7	7	6	29	.157	.234	.186
SS	Zack Short	22	50	9	11	2	0	2	7	0	4	18	.220	.291	.380
OF	Zach Cole*	15	47	9	12	2	0	4	11	3	5	20	.255	.327	.553
2B	Brice Matthews	13	42	6	7	0	0	4	9	1	2	20	.167	.222	.452
UT	Shay Whitcomb	20	32	4	4	0	0	1	1	0	0	10	.125	.125	.219
IF	Luis Guillorme^{#}	12	20	2	3	0	0	0	0	0	1	8	.150	.190	.150
C	César Salazar*	11	13	0	3	0	0	0	1	0	2	2	.231	.375	.231
DH	Jon Singleton	3	9	0	1	0	0	0	0	0	0	1	.111	.111	.111
CF	Kenedy Corona	3	2	0	0	0	0	0	0	0	2	1	.000	.500	.000
'**Team totals**		**162**	**5490**	**686**	**1372**	**247**	**12**	**182**	**655**	**85**	**471**	**1371**	**.250**	**.315**	**.399**

=== Pitching ===
Statistics legend
⌖	Pitching role	ERA	Earned run average	GF	Games finished	IP	Innings pitched	ER	Earned runs allowed	WHIP	Walks plus hits per inning pitched
W	Wins	G	Games pitched	SV	Saves	H	Hits allowed	BB	Base on balls	K/BB	Strikeout-to-walk ratio
L	Losses	GS	Games started	HD	Holds	R	Runs allowed	SO	Strikeouts

Individual pitching results
⌖	Player	W	L	ERA	G	GS	SV	IP	H	R	ER	BB	SO
SP	Framber Valdez*	13	11	3.66	31	31	0	192.0	171	82	78	68	187
SP	Hunter Brown	12	9	2.43	31	31	0	185.1	133	55	50	57	206
SP	Ryan Gusto	7	4	4.92	24	14	0	86.0	95	50	47	28	87
SP	Colton Gordon*	6	4	5.34	20	14	1	86.0	103	54	51	19	72
SP	Jason Alexander	4	2	3.66	14	13	1	71.1	68	32	29	21	60
SP	Lance McCullers Jr.	2	5	6.51	16	13	0	55.1	61	45	40	39	61
CL	Josh Hader^	6	2	2.05	48	0	28	52.2	29	16	12	16	76
SU	Steven Okert*	3	2	3.01	68	1	1	71.2	45	25	24	19	84
SU	Bryan Abreu	3	4	2.28	70	0	7	71.0	51	18	18	31	105
MR	Bryan King*	5	4	2.78	68	0	2	68.0	60	21	21	11	69
MR	Bennett Sousa*	5	1	2.84	44	0	4	50.2	37	18	16	15	59
MR	Kaleb Ort	2	2	4.89	49	0	1	46.0	35	26	25	27	49
	Brandon Walter*	1	3	3.35	9	9	0	53.2	46	20	20	4	52
	Ronel Blanco	3	4	4.10	9	9	0	48.1	37	22	22	20	48
	Cristian Javier	2	4	4.62	8	8	0	37.0	32	22	19	15	34
	Spencer Arrighetti	1	5	5.35	7	7	0	35.1	30	21	21	20	31
	AJ Blubaugh	3	1	1.69	11	3	0	32.0	17	11	6	11	35
	Hayden Wesneski	1	3	4.50	6	6	0	32.0	29	16	16	6	29
	Shawn Dubin	2	0	5.61	23	0	0	25.2	30	16	16	8	21
	Enyel De Los Santos	3	0	4.03	22	0	0	22.1	22	10	10	6	24
	Tayler Scott	1	2	7.36	18	0	0	18.1	21	16	15	14	17
	Luis Contreras	0	0	6.75	9	0	0	12.0	11	9	9	8	13
	Jayden Murray	0	0	1.54	9	1	0	11.2	10	2	2	3	8
	Hector Neris	0	1	5.40	12	0	0	11.2	13	11	7	8	15
	Craig Kimbrel	0	1	2.45	13	0	0	11.0	9	4	3	6	16
	Logan VanWey	0	0	5.06	9	0	0	10.2	15	7	6	3	7
	Nick Hernandez	0	0	5.06	10	0	0	10.2	12	6	6	8	11
	Luis García	1	0	3.52	2	2	0	7.2	3	3	3	1	7
	Forrest Whitley	0	0	12.27	5	0	0	7.1	9	10	10	6	8
	Jordan Weems	0	1	14.54	4	0	0	4.1	9	7	7	3	0
	J.P. France	1	0	2.25	2	0	0	4.0	2	1	1	2	5
	Rafael Montero	0	0	4.50	3	0	0	4.0	3	2	2	2	5
PO	Chas McCormick*	0	0	6.00	3	0	0	3.0	3	2	2	2	1
	John Rooney*	0	0	6.75	1	0	0	1.1	1	1	1	1	2
PO	César Salazar	0	0	0.00	1	0	0	1.0	0	0	0	0	0
PO	Cooper Hummel	0	0	36.00	1	0	0	1.0	5	4	4	0	0
**Team totals**		**87**	**75**	**3.86**	**162**	**162**	**45**	**1442.0**	**1257**	**665**	**619**	**508**	**1504**
Other: Complete games—Valdez (2), Brown (1) • Sources:

== Awards and achievements ==
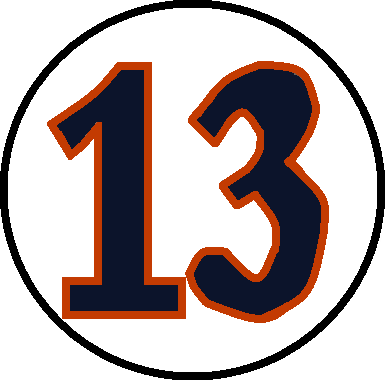
Billy Wagner's number 13 was retired by the Houston Astros in 2025.

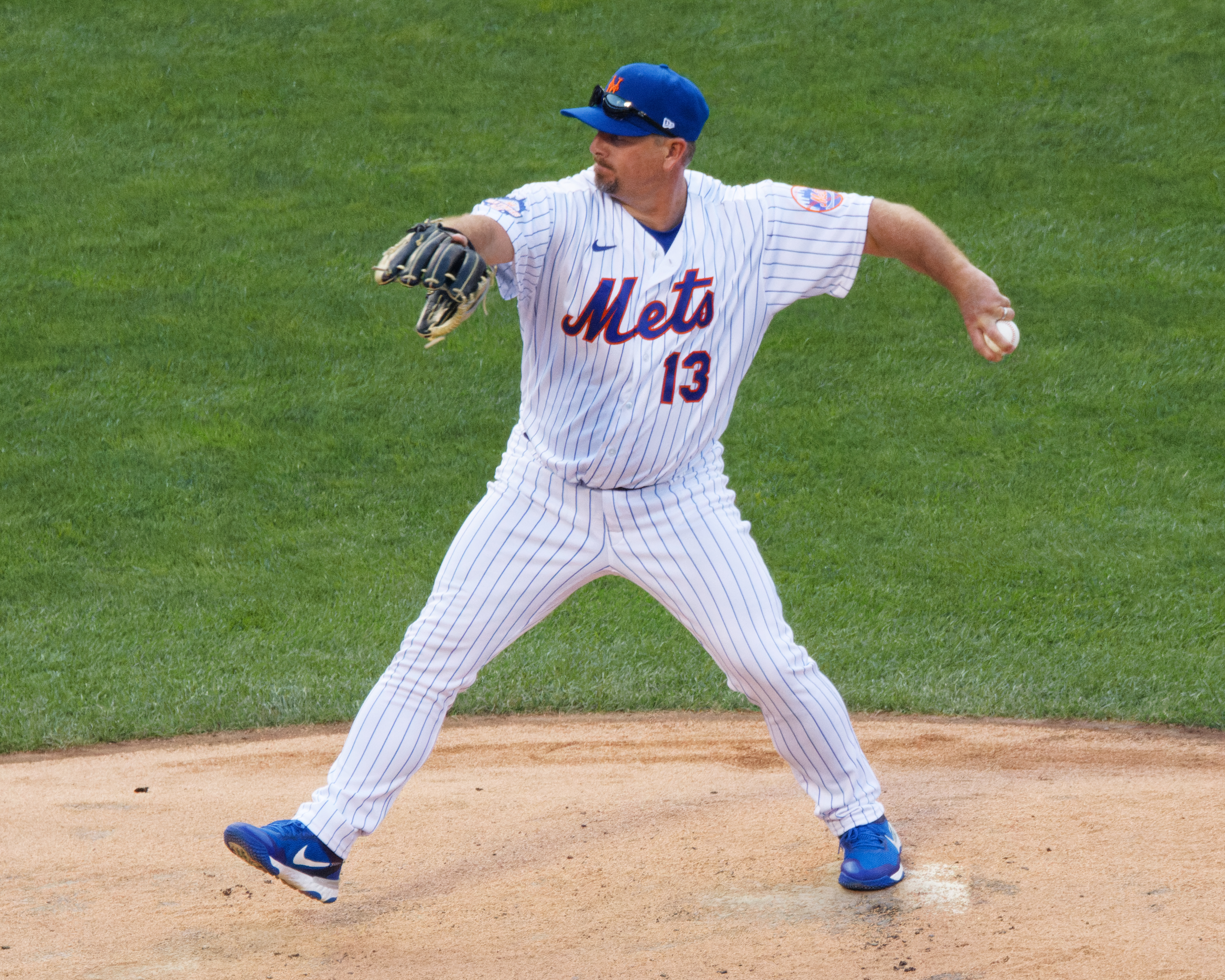
HOF inductee Billy Wagner

=== Grand slams ===
No.	Date	Astros batter	Venue	Inning	Pitcher	Opposing team	Box
1	April 11	Yainer Díaz (Note: 1st MLB grand slam)	Daikin Park	5	Los Angeles Angels	Jack Kochanowicz	
2	July 1	Víctor Caratini	Coors Field	3	Colorado Rockies	Chase Dollander	
3	July 4	Víctor Caratini	Dodger Stadium	6	Los Angeles Dodgers	Noah Davis	
4	September 20	Jeremy Peña	Daikin Park	7	Seattle Mariners	Carlos Vargas	

=== Career honors ===
Astros elected to Baseball Hall of Fame
Individual	Position	Houston Astros career					Induction	
Individual	Position	Uni.	Seasons	Games	Start	Finish	Induction	
Billy Wagner	Relief pitcher	13 (Note: Uniform number retired on August 16, 2025.)	9	464	1995	2003	Class	Inducted as an Astro • Plaque
See also: Members of the Baseball Hall of Fame • Source:

=== Annual awards ===
2025 Houston Astros award winners
Name of award			Recipient	Ref.
All-MLB Team	Second Team	Starting pitcher	Hunter Brown	
American League (AL) Pitcher of the Month		June	Hunter Brown	
American League (AL) Reliever of the Month		June	Josh Hader	
Darryl Kile Good Guy Award			Josh Hader	
Gold Glove Award		Utility player	Mauricio Dubón	
Fred Hartman Award for Long and Meritorious Service to Baseball			Alex Treviño	
Houston Astros		Most Valuable Player (MVP)	Jeremy Peña	
Houston Astros		Pitcher of the Year	Hunter Brown	
Houston Astros		Rookie of the Year	Cam Smith	
MLB All-Star Game		Reserve pitcher	Hunter Brown	
MLB All-Star Game		Reserve pitcher	Josh Hader	
MLB All-Star Game		Reserve infielder	Isaac Paredes	
MLB All-Star Game		Reserve infielder	Jeremy Peña	

Other awards results

Name of award	Voting recipient(s) (Team)	Ref.
AL Cy Young	1st—Skubal (DET) • 3rd—Brown (HOU)	
AL Gold Glove at right field	Winner—Abreu (BOS) • Nominee—Smith (HOU)	
AL Manager of the Year	1st—Vogt (CLE) • 6th—Espada (HOU)	
AL Most Valuable Player	1st—Judge (NYY) • 10th—Peña (HOU)	
AL Rookie of the Year	1st—Kurtz (ATH) • 10th—Smith (HOU)	
AL Silver Slugger at shortstop	Winner—Witt Jr. (KC) • Finalist—Peña (HOU)	
Heart & Hustle	Winner—Witt Jr. (KC) • Nominee—Peña (HOU)	
Roberto Clemente	Winner—Betts (LAD) • Nominee—Hader (HOU)	

=== League leaders ===
==== AL pitching leaders ====
- Complete games: Framber Valdez (2)
- Wild pitches: Framber Valdez (12)

==== AL fielding leaders ====
- Putouts: Christian Walker (1,100)

=== Milestones ===
==== Major League debuts ====
Player—Appeared at position

- Cam Smith, right fielder
- Ryan Gusto, relief pitcher
- Logan VanWey, relief pitcher
- A. J. Blubaugh, starting pitcher
- Colton Gordon, starting pitcher
- Jacob Melton, center fielder
- Kenedy Corona, center fielder
- Brice Matthews, second baseman
- John Rooney, relief pitcher
- Zach Cole, left fielder

Date and opponent

- March 27 vs New York (NL) (Note: Opening Day)
- March 31 vs San Francisco
- April 11 vs Los Angeles (AL)
- April 30 vs Detroit
- May 14 vs Kansas City
- June 1 vs Tampa Bay
- July 7 vs Cleveland
- July 11 vs Texas
- August 24 at Baltimore
- September 12 at Atlanta
Further :
Box

Individual career milestones in 2025
Date	Individual	Position	Quantity	Statistic	Note	Ref.
March 27, 2025 ^{[Opening Day]}	Cam Smith	Right fielder	1st	hit	Major league debut	
March 27, 2025 ^{[Opening Day]}	Josh Hader	Relief pitcher	200th	save	35th save as member of Astros	
March 31, 2025	Ryan Gusto	Relief pitcher	1st	strikeout	Major league debut	
April 3, 2025	Jose Altuve	Left fielder	1st	5-strikeout game		
April 11, 2025	Yainer Díaz	Catcher	1st	grand slam		
April 11, 2025	Cam Smith	Right fielder	1st	home run		
April 23, 2025	Christian Walker	First baseman	150th	home run	3rd home run as member of Astros	
May 10, 2025	Jose Altuve	Left fielder	700th	extra-base hit	4th Astro to reach this milestone	
May 15, 2025	Hunter Brown	Starting pitcher	1st	complete game		
May 22, 2025	Jeremy Peña	Shortstop	500th	hit		
May 27, 2025	Jose Altuve	Designated hitter	40th	4-hit game	Extended own franchise record	
June 1, 2025	Jacob Melton	Center fielder	1st	hit		
June 3, 2025	Lance McCullers Jr.	Starting pitcher	50th	win	First win since Sept. 21, 2022	
June 6, 2025	Colton Gordon	Starting pitcher	1st	win		
June 29, 2025	Framber Valdez	Starting pitcher	974th	strikeout	10th place in Astros history (Note: Passed Darryl Kile (973).)	
July 2, 2025	Shay Whitcomb	Designated hitter	1st	home run		
July 2, 2025	Jose Altuve	Second baseman	2,315th	hit	Second place in Astros history (Note: Passed Bagwell (2,314).)	
July 2, 2025	Hunter Brown	Starting pitcher	500th	strikeout		
July 5, 2025	Framber Valdez	Starting pitcher	1,000th	inning pitched		
July 21, 2025	Brice Matthews	Second baseman	1st	home run	(Note: Also first multi-home run game in the major leagues.)	
July 28, 2025	Framber Valdez	Starting pitcher	1,000th	strikeout		
August 2, 2025	Christian Walker	First baseman	500th	run batted in (RBI)		
August 10, 2025	Jose Altuve	Designated hitter	250th	home run	(Note: Became 17th player in major league history to reach both 250 home runs and 300 stolen bases.)	
August 11, 2025	Héctor Neris	Relief pitcher	10	yrs service time		
September 10, 2025	Carlos Correa	Third baseman	200th	home run		

=== Ejections ===
No.	Date	Astros personnel	H/A	Opposing team	Ref
1	May 18, 2025	Joe Espada	A	Texas Rangers	
2	August 6, 2025	Josh Miller	A	Miami Marlins	

== Minor league system ==
=== Teams ===
Level	Team	League	Division	W	L	WPct	GB (Note: Overall records for the entire season are presented—some minor leagues play a split season, with first-half and second-half results determining playoff participants.)	Manager	Notes	Ref.
AAA	Sugar Land Space Cowboys	Pacific Coast League	East	73	76	.490	10 1/2	Mickey Storey		
AA	Corpus Christi Hooks	Texas League	South	48	89	.350	25 1/2	Ricky Rivera		
High-A	Asheville Tourists	South Atlantic League	South	52	76	.406	16	Nate Shaver		
Low-A	Fayetteville Woodpeckers	Carolina League	North	69	63	.523	2 1/2	Carlos Lugo		
Rookie	FCL Astros	Florida Complex League	East	37	16	.698	—	Vince Blue	Division champions	
Rookie	DSL Astros Blue	Dominican Summer League	West	32	23	.582	3	Johe Acosta	Quarterfinals qualified	
Final regular season standings.

=== Summary ===
Corpus Christi starting pitcher José Fleury received Texas League Pitcher of the Month honors for April. He compiled a 2–0 W–L, 0.82 ERA, 5 walks, and 11 hits allowed in 22 innings over four starts. Beginning the season with 18 1/3 scoreless innings, he also held opponents to a .149 average.

On May 10, 2025, Brice Matthews, playing for Sugar Land, hit for the cycle, the first of his career in professional baseball. He led a 12–7 win over the Salt Lake Bees and the cycle was the second in Space Cowboys franchise history.

Another player hit for the cycle on May 13, 2025—this time by Colin Barber, an outfielder for Corpus Christi—to lead a 20–14 win against the Frisco RoughRiders at Riders Field. Meanwhile, Zach Cole hit a grand slam, a two-run home run and drove in career-best 8 runs. Cole's 8 RBI tied the Hooks' single-game club record.

The Space Cowboys won 12 in a row through May 22 until a 16–3 defeat at Constellation Field to the Las Vegas Aviators.

Miguel Ullola was credited with a 3–0 W–L, 1.17 ERA over 5 starts in the month of May, thus being named Pacific Coast League (PCL) Pitcher of the Month, his first monthly award in the PCL. The league leader for May in ERA and opponents' batting average (.175), he tossed 23 innings, allowed three runs, walked 13, and struck out 34.

On July 3, Kenedy Corona stroked a walk-off single for Sugar Land, a 7–6 win versus the Round Rock Express in extra innings. In the bottom of the ninth, with Corona on base, Jesús Bastidas hit a game-tying 3-run home run off closer Craig Kimbrel. Down 6–0, it had been Sugar Land's largest comeback through that point in the season.

=== Awards ===
- All-Star Futures Game selectees:
  - Brice Matthews, 2B/SS
  - Alimber Santa, RHP
- Houston Astros Minor League Pitcher of the Year: Bryce Mayer
- Houston Astros Minor League Player of the Year: Zach Cole
- Pacific Coast League (PCL) Pitcher of the Month—May: Miguel Ullola
- Texas League Pitcher of the Month—April—José Fleury

== See also ==
- List of Major League Baseball annual putouts leaders
- List of Major League Baseball players with a home run in their first major league at bat
- List of Major League Baseball retired numbers
- List of Major League Baseball tie-breakers
