= Brandon Walter =

American baseball player (born 1996)

Houston Astros – No. 60
- Pitcher
- Born: September 8, 1996 (age 30); New Castle, Delaware, U.S.
- Bats: Left Throws: Left

MLB debut
- June 22, 2023, for the Boston Red Sox

MLB statistics (through 2025 season)
- Win–loss record: 1–3
- Earned run average: 4.23
- Strikeouts: 68
- Stats at Baseball Reference

Teams
- Boston Red Sox (2023); Houston Astros (2025)

Brandon Lee Walter (born September 8, 1996) is an American professional baseball pitcher for the Houston Astros of Major League Baseball (MLB). He has previously played in MLB for the Boston Red Sox.

== Early life and amateur career ==
Walter grew up in New Castle, Delaware, and attended Hodgson Vo-Tech High School, where he played for the school's baseball team. He finished his high school career with a 23–3 win–loss record and a 0.83 earned run average (ERA).

Walter attended the University of Delaware and played college baseball for the Delaware Fightin' Blue Hens. He became the Blue Hens' primary weekend starter as a freshman and was named third team All-Colonial Athletic Association after going 7–3 with a 3.63 ERA and 85 strikeouts. Walter tore the ulnar collateral ligament in his pitching elbow in the ninth start of his sophomore season, requiring him to undergo Tommy John surgery and miss the rest of the year and his entire junior season. He returned in 2019 and went 5–6 with a 3.86 ERA while striking out 106 batters over 86 1/3 innings pitched.

== Professional career ==
=== Boston Red Sox ===
The Boston Red Sox selected Walter in the 26th round, with the 797th overall selection, of the 2019 Major League Baseball draft. After signing with the team, he was assigned to the Gulf Coast League Red Sox, where he posted a 4–1 record and 2.70 ERA with 39 strikeouts in 33 1/3 innings pitched across 13 appearances. Walter did not play in a game in 2020 due to the cancellation of the minor league season because of the COVID-19 pandemic.

Walter began the 2021 season with the Low-A Salem Red Sox. He was promoted to the High-A Greenville Drive after posting a 1.45 ERA over 13 appearances. Walter made 25 appearances with 14 starts between the two teams and was named the Red Sox Minor League Pitcher of the Year after having a 2.92 ERA, a 0.97 WHIP, and a .199 batting average against.

Walter began the 2022 season in Double-A with the Portland Sea Dogs. In June, he was promoted to the Triple-A Worcester Red Sox. On November 15, 2022, Walter was added to Boston's 40-man roster. Walter was optioned to Triple-A Worcester to begin the 2023 season. Through 13 games (12 starts), Walter struggled to a 6.28 ERA with 64 strikeouts across 61 2/3 innings pitched.

On June 22, Walter was added to Boston's active roster for the first time. He made his major-league debut that day, pitching 6 2/3 innings in relief, allowing three runs. He was then optioned back to Worcester, recalled to Boston on July 4, and returned to Worcester on July 24. He was next recalled to Boston on August 9, and returned to Worcester two days later. Walter picked up his first MLB save on July 8, 2023, pitching 3 innings in a Red Sox victory over Oakland. Walter spent additional time with the Red Sox during September, when major-league rosters expanded to 28 players. Walter was named the winner of the Red Sox' Lou Gorman Award for 2023, recognizing a player who exhibited perseverance in overcoming obstacles to reach the major leagues.

Walter was optioned to Triple-A Worcester prior to the start of the 2024 season. He did not appear for Boston due to a rotator cuff injury, and was designated for assignment following the acquisition of Lucas Sims on July 30, 2024. He was released by the Red Sox organization on August 2.

=== Houston Astros ===
On August 15, 2024, Walter signed a minor league contract with the Houston Astros. He began the 2025 season with the Triple-A Sugar Land Space Cowboys, posting a 3-1 record and 1.94 ERA with 41 strikeouts over 10 appearances (six starts). On May 20, 2025, the Astros selected Walter's contract, adding him to their active roster. He made his debut with the Astros that day, which was also his first major league start. In that start, Walter tossed five scoreless innings against the Tampa Bay Rays at George M. Steinbrenner Field; however, the Rays rallied for 3–2 win and Walter received a no decision. In nine starts for Houston, he posted a 1-3 record and 3.35 ERA with 52 strikeouts across 53 2/3 innings pitched. Walter was placed on the injured list on July 24 with left elbow inflammation, and was transferred to the 60-day injured list on August 22. On September 23, Walter underwent ulnar collateral ligament reconstruction surgery.

Awards
Preceded by Zack Kelly	Lou Gorman Award; 2023	Succeeded by Incumbent
