= Logan VanWey =

American baseball player (born 1999)

Houston Astros – No. 64
- Pitcher
- Born: February 14, 1999 (age 27); Joplin, Missouri, U.S.
- Bats: Right Throws: Right

MLB debut
- April 11, 2025, for the Houston Astros

MLB statistics (through 2026 season)
- Win–loss record: 1–0
- Earned run average: 3.09
- Strikeouts: 16
- Stats at Baseball Reference

Teams
- Houston Astros (2025–present)

Logan Christopher VanWey (born February 14, 1999) is an American professional baseball pitcher for the Houston Astros of Major League Baseball (MLB).

== Career ==
=== Amateur ===
VanWey attended Webb City High School in Webb City, Missouri, and Missouri Southern State University, where he played college baseball for the Missouri Southern Lions.

=== Glacier Range Riders ===
During the beginning of the 2022 season, VanWey played for the Glacier Range Riders of the independent Pioneer League. In nine starts for the team, VanWey posted a 2-2 record and 6.64 ERA with 46 strikeouts across 39 1/3 innings pitched.

=== Houston Astros ===
On July 28, 2022, VanWey signed with the Houston Astros as an undrafted free agent. He made his affiliated debut with the rookie-level Florida Complex League Astros, recording four scoreless appearances with one win and 16 strikeouts over eight innings.

VanWey split the 2023 season between the High-A Asheville Tourists, Double-A Corpus Christi Hooks, and Triple-A Sugar Land Space Cowboys, accumulating a 2-1 record and 3.72 ERA with 63 strikeouts and three saves across 40 appearances. He returned to Sugar Land for the 2024 season. In 60 appearances out of the bullpen, VanWey compiled a 9-1 record and 3.22 ERA with 98 strikeouts and four saves across 72 2/3 innings pitched.

On April 7, 2025, VanWey was selected to the 40-man roster and promoted to the major leagues for the first time. He made his MLB debut on April 11 against the Los Angeles Angels. In nine appearances for Houston during his rookie campaign, VanWey recorded a 5.06 ERA with seven strikeouts across 10 2/3 innings pitched. On December 5, VanWey was removed from the 40-man roster and sent outright to Triple-A Sugar Land.

VanWey was assigned to Triple-A Sugar Land to begin the 2026 season, compiling a 1-1 record and 5.74 ERA with 19 strikeouts over 15 games. On May 8, 2026, the Astros selected VanWey's contract, adding him to their active roster. On June 23, VanWey recorded his first career win, allowing one run across two innings of relief against the Toronto Blue Jays.
