= John Rooney (baseball) =

American baseball player (born 1997)

Free agent
- Pitcher
- Born: January 28, 1997 (age 29); Melrose, New York, U.S.
- Bats: Right Throws: Left

MLB debut
- August 24, 2025, for the Houston Astros

MLB statistics (through 2025 season)
- Win–loss record: 0–0
- Earned run average: 6.75
- Strikeouts: 2
- Stats at Baseball Reference

Teams
- Houston Astros (2025)

John Rooney (born January 28, 1997) is an American professional baseball pitcher who is a free agent. He has previously played in Major League Baseball (MLB) for the Houston Astros.

== Amateur career ==
A native of Melrose, New York, Rooney attended Hoosic Valley High School Hofstra University, where he and played college baseball for the Hofstra Pride. In 2017, he played collegiate summer baseball with the Yarmouth–Dennis Red Sox of the Cape Cod Baseball League.

== Professional career ==
=== Los Angeles Dodgers ===
The Los Angeles Dodgers drafted Rooney in the third round, with the 104th overall selection, of the 2018 Major League Baseball draft. He split his first professional season between the rookie-level Arizona League Dodgers and Single-A Great Lakes Loons, recording a 1.80 ERA in eight starts. Rooney split the 2019 campaign between Great Lakes and the High-A Rancho Cucamonga Quakes, accumulating a combined 10-4 record and 2.84 ERA with 89 strikeouts in 104 2/3 innings pitched across 20 starts.

Rooney did not play in a game in 2020 due to the cancellation of the minor league season because of the COVID-19 pandemic. He returned to action in 2021 with the Double-A Tulsa Drillers, compiling an 0-2 record and 4.08 ERA with 42 strikeouts across eight appearances (five starts). Rooney made 24 appearances (17 starts) for Tulsa in 2022, struggling to a 4-7 record and 6.15 ERA with 99 strikeouts over 98 innings of work.

In 2023, Rooney spent time with Tulsa and the Triple-A Oklahoma City Dodgers. In 53 appearances (one start) for the two affiliates, he posted a cumulative 6-3 record and 2.86 ERA with 69 strikeouts and three saves across 69 1/3 innings pitched. Rooney made 53 appearances out of the bullpen for the Triple-A Oklahoma City Baseball Club in 2024, registering a 5-2 record and 4.33 ERA with 71 strikeouts and one save across 60 1/3 innings pitched. He elected free agency following the season on November 4, 2024.

=== Miami Marlins ===
On November 13, 2024, Rooney signed a minor league contract with the Miami Marlins organization. Rooney made 38 appearances for the Triple-A Jacksonville Jumbo Shrimp in 2025, compiling a 2-1 record and 2.45 ERA with 45 strikeouts and four saves across 33 innings of work.

=== Houston Astros ===
On August 3, 2025, the Marlins traded Rooney to the Houston Astros in exchange for cash considerations; he was subsequently added to the 40-man roster and promoted him to the major leagues for the first time. On August 5, he was optioned to the Triple-A Sugar Land Space Cowboys without appearing for Houston, becoming a phantom ballplayer. On August 24, the Astros promoted Rooney to the major leagues for a second time. He pitched 1 1/3 innings of relief but allowed a Luis Vázquez solo home run in his MLB debut in a 3–2 away loss to the Baltimore Orioles on August 24. On August 26, Rooney was placed on the injured list due to left elbow inflammation. He was transferred to the 60-day injured list on September 3, officially ending his season. On September 23, it was announced that Rooney had undergone surgery to remove bone spurs and address tennis elbow. On November 6, Rooney was removed from the 40-man roster and sent outright to Sugar Land. He elected free agency the same day.

=== Tampa Bay Rays ===
On November 15, 2025, Rooney signed a minor league contract with the Tampa Bay Rays. In 25 games between Triple-A and High-A he threw 28 innings of relief going 2-1 with a 3.86 ERA with 32 strikeouts and one save. He elected free agency on November 2.
