= Zach Cole =

American baseball player (born 2000)

Houston Astros – No. 16
- Outfielder
- Born: August 4, 2000 (age 26); Springfield, Missouri, U.S.
- Bats: Left Throws: Right

MLB debut
- September 12, 2025, for the Houston Astros

MLB statistics (through 2026 season)
- Batting average: .204
- Home runs: 7
- Runs batted in: 19
- Stats at Baseball Reference

Teams
- Houston Astros (2025–present)

Zachary Robert Cole (born August 4, 2000) is an American professional baseball outfielder for the Houston Astros of Major League Baseball (MLB). He made his MLB debut in 2025.

== Amateur career ==
Cole attended Springfield Catholic High School in Springfield, Missouri, and played college baseball at the Ball State University. He also played collegiate summer baseball with the Rochester Honkers of the Northwoods League in 2021 and with the Cotuit Kettleers of the Cape Cod Baseball League in 2022.

== Professional career ==
Cole was drafted by the Houston Astros in the 10th round of the 2022 Major League Baseball draft. He started his first professional season with the Florida Complex League Astros and would later be promoted to the Single-A Fayetteville Woodpeckers. Cole started the 2023 season with the Single-A Fayetteville Woodpeckers, getting promoted to the High-A Asheville Tourists after 70 games with the Woodpeckers.

Cole began the 2024 season injured and started back with the Florida Complex League Astros on a rehab assignment. Following his rehab, he would be promoted to the Double-A Corpus Christi Hooks.

Cole began the 2025 season with the Double-A Corpus Christi Hooks, and later received a promotion to the Triple-A Sugar Land Space Cowboys; in 97 appearances for the two affiliates, he batted .279/.377/.539 with 19 home runs, 65 RBI, and 18 stolen bases. On September 12, 2025, Cole was selected to the 40-man roster and promoted to the major leagues for the first time. He made his debut starting in left field on the same day against the Atlanta Braves, recording a home run on the first pitch of his first major league at-bat and a total of four RBI in a 11–3 win. Cole became the fifth player in Astros' franchise history to hit a home run in his first major league at-bat, and only the second to do so on the first pitch, following Mark Saccomanno, who accomplished the feat in 2008. He made 15 appearances for Houston during his rookie season, batting .255/.327/.553 with four home runs, 11 RBI, and three stolen bases.

Cole was optioned to Triple-A Sugar Land to begin the 2026 season. He made his season debut for the Astros on May 4, 2026, hitting a home run against Yoshinobu Yamamoto of the Los Angeles Dodgers. Cole made 19 appearances for Houston, batting .157/.189/.353/.542, three home runs and eight RBI.

== See also ==
- List of Major League Baseball players with a home run in their first major league at bat
