= Luis Vázquez (baseball) =

Puerto Rican baseball player (born 1999)

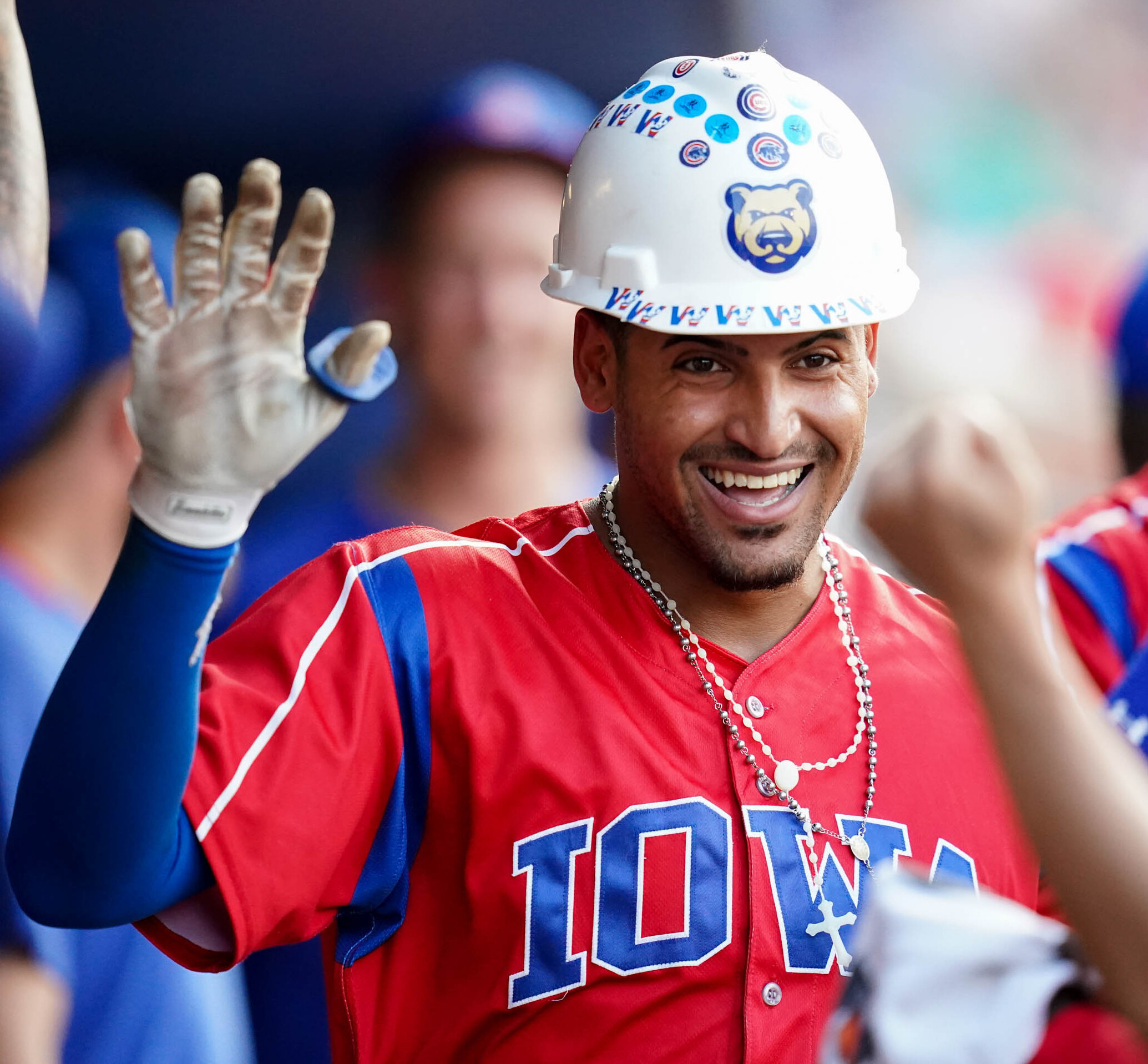
- Vázquez with the Iowa Cubs in 2023

Free agent
- Infielder
- Born: October 10, 1999 (age 27); Orocovis, Puerto Rico
- Bats: Right Throws: Right

MLB debut
- May 22, 2024, for the Chicago Cubs

MLB statistics (through 2026 season)
- Batting average: .145
- Home runs: 1
- Runs batted in: 4
- Stats at Baseball Reference

Teams
- Chicago Cubs (2024); Baltimore Orioles (2025–2026)

Luis Vázquez (born October 10, 1999) is a Puerto Rican professional baseball infielder who is a free agent. He has previously played in Major League Baseball (MLB) for the Chicago Cubs and Baltimore Orioles.

== Career ==
=== Chicago Cubs ===
Vázquez was drafted by the Chicago Cubs in the 14th round, with the 435th overall selection, of the 2017 Major League Baseball draft out of Alberto Meléndez Torres High School in Orocovis, Puerto Rico. He made his professional debut with the rookie–level Arizona League Cubs, hitting .185 in 29 games. Vázquez spent the 2018 campaign with the Low–A Eugene Emeralds, batting .193/.254/.289 with three home runs, 19 RBI, and 11 stolen bases.

Vázquez split the 2019 campaign between the Triple–A Iowa Cubs, Double–A Tennessee Smokies, Single–A South Bend Cubs, and Eugene. In 106 games for the four affiliates, he accumulated a .234/.288/.300 batting line with two home runs and 25 RBI. Vázquez did not play in a game in 2020 due to the cancellation of the minor league season because of the COVID-19 pandemic.

He returned to action in 2021, playing for the rookie–level Arizona Complex League Cubs, South Bend, and Tennessee. Vázquez batted a cumulative .264/.352/.328 with two home runs, 14 RBI, and five stolen bases across 34 total games. He split 2022 between Iowa and Tennessee, slashing .225/.276/.345 with nine home runs and 43 RBI across 113 total contests.

Vázquez spent the 2023 season back with Double–A Tennessee and Triple–A Iowa. In 124 games between the two affiliates, he hit a combined .271/.361/.456 with 20 home runs, 80 RBI, and 10 stolen bases. On November 6, 2023, the Cubs added Vázquez to their 40-man roster. He was optioned to the Triple–A Iowa Cubs to begin the 2024 season.

On May 21, 2024, Vázquez was promoted to the major leagues for the first time. He made his debut the following day as a defensive replacement for Nico Hoerner, and struck out in his only at–bat. In 11 games for Chicago, he went 1-for-12 (.083) with 1 RBI. Vázquez was designated for assignment following the signing of Jon Berti on January 28, 2025.

=== Baltimore Orioles ===
On January 31, 2025, Vázquez was traded to the Baltimore Orioles in exchange for cash considerations. He was designated for assignment by the Orioles following the signing of Ramón Laureano on February 4. Vázquez cleared waivers and was sent outright to the Triple-A Norfolk Tides on February 7. In 37 appearances for Norfolk, he batted .280/.345/.447 with five home runs, 20 RBI, and three stolen bases. On June 10, the Orioles selected Vázquez's contract, adding him to their active roster. His first MLB home run was a solo shot off John Rooney in the seventh inning of a 3–2 home win over the Houston Astros on August 24. Vázquez made 33 appearances for the Orioles, slashing .160/.208/.240 with one home run, three RBI, and two stolen bases. On November 18, Vázquez was designated for assignment by the Orioles. He cleared waivers and was sent outright to Norfolk on November 23.

On March 23, 2026, Vázquez was placed on the injured list after he broke his right thumb on a hit by pitch during spring training. After rehabilitating with the High–A Frederick Keys, he went on to make 50 appearances for Triple–A Norfolk, hitting .225 with six home runs, 18 RBI, and seven stolen bases. On August 26, the Orioles selected Vázquez's contract, adding him to their active roster. He made his season debut for Baltimore that day against the St. Louis Cardinals, appearing as a pinch runner and defensive replacement for Samuel Basallo in the ninth inning. Vázquez was designated for assignment by the Orioles on August 31. He cleared waivers and was sent outright to Triple–A Norfolk on September 3. On October 15, Vázquez elected for free agency.
