= Kenedy Corona =

Venezuelan baseball player (born 2000)

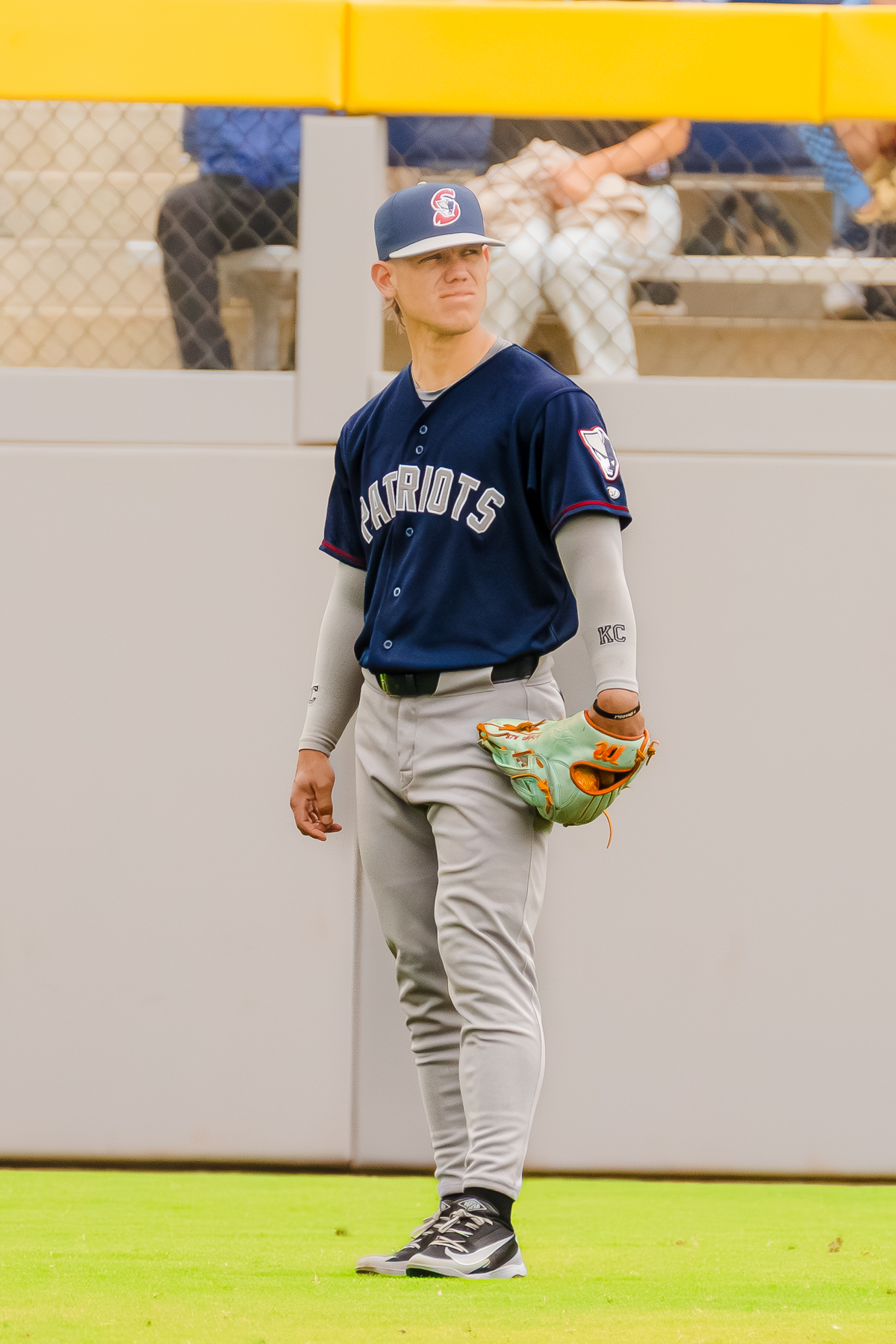
- Corona playing for the Somerset Patriots in 2026

Free agent
- Outfielder
- Born: March 21, 2000 (age 26); Maracaibo, Zulia, Venezuela
- Bats: Right Throws: Right

MLB debut
- July 7, 2025, for the Houston Astros

MLB statistics (through 2025 season)
- Batting average: .000
- Home runs: 0
- Runs batted in: 0
- Stats at Baseball Reference

Teams
- Houston Astros (2025)

Kenedy Junior Corona (born March 21, 2000) is a Venezuelan professional baseball outfielder who is a free agent. He has previously played in Major League Baseball (MLB) for the Houston Astros.

== Career ==
=== New York Mets ===
Corona signed with the New York Mets as an international free agent on April 6, 2019. He split his first professional season between the Dominican Summer League Mets, rookie-level Gulf Coast League Mets, and Low-A Brooklyn Cyclones. In 63 appearances split between the three affiliates, Corona batted .301/.398/.470 with five home runs, 29 RBI, and 19 stolen bases.

=== Houston Astros ===
On December 6, 2019, the Mets traded Corona and Blake Taylor to the Houston Astros in exchange for Jake Marisnick. He did not play in a game in 2020 due to the cancellation of the minor league season because of the COVID-19 pandemic. Corona returned to action in 2021 with the Single-A Fayetteville Woodpeckers, hitting .244/.306/.343 with two home runs, 22 RBI, and 19 stolen bases across 57 appearances.

Corona split the 2022 season between Fayetteville and the High-A Asheville Tourists, batting a cumulative .278/.362/.495 with 19 home runs, 67 RBI, and 28 stolen bases over 107 total appearances. He made 117 appearances split between Asheville and the Double-A Corpus Christi Hooks in 2023, slashing .251/.331/.458 with 22 home runs, 65 RBI, and 32 stolen bases. Corona played in the Arizona Fall League for the Mesa Solar Sox after the season.

On November 14, 2023, the Astros added Corona to their 40-man roster to protect him from the Rule 5 draft. He was optioned to the Triple–A Sugar Land Space Cowboys to begin the 2024 season. Corona made 98 appearances split between Corpus Christi and Sugar Land, batting a cumulative .214/.314/.290 with three home runs, 29 RBI, and 27 stolen bases.

Corona was optioned to Triple-A Sugar Land to begin the 2025 season, with whom he batted .228/.315/.351 with six home runs, 28 RBI, and eight stolen bases. On July 7, 2025, Corona was promoted to the major leagues for the first time. In three appearances for Houston during his rookie campaign, he went 0-for-2 with two walks. On November 4, Corona was placed on outright wavers by the Astros. After clearing waivers two days later, he was removed from the 40-man roster and sent outright to Sugar Land. Corona elected free agency the same day.

=== New York Yankees ===
On December 24, 2025, Corona signed a minor league contract with the New York Yankees. In 102 games between Triple-A and Double-A he batted .255/.349/.427 with 12 home runs, 53 RBIs and 23 stolen bases. He elected free agency on November 2.
