= 2026 Seattle Mariners season =

2026 Seattle Mariners
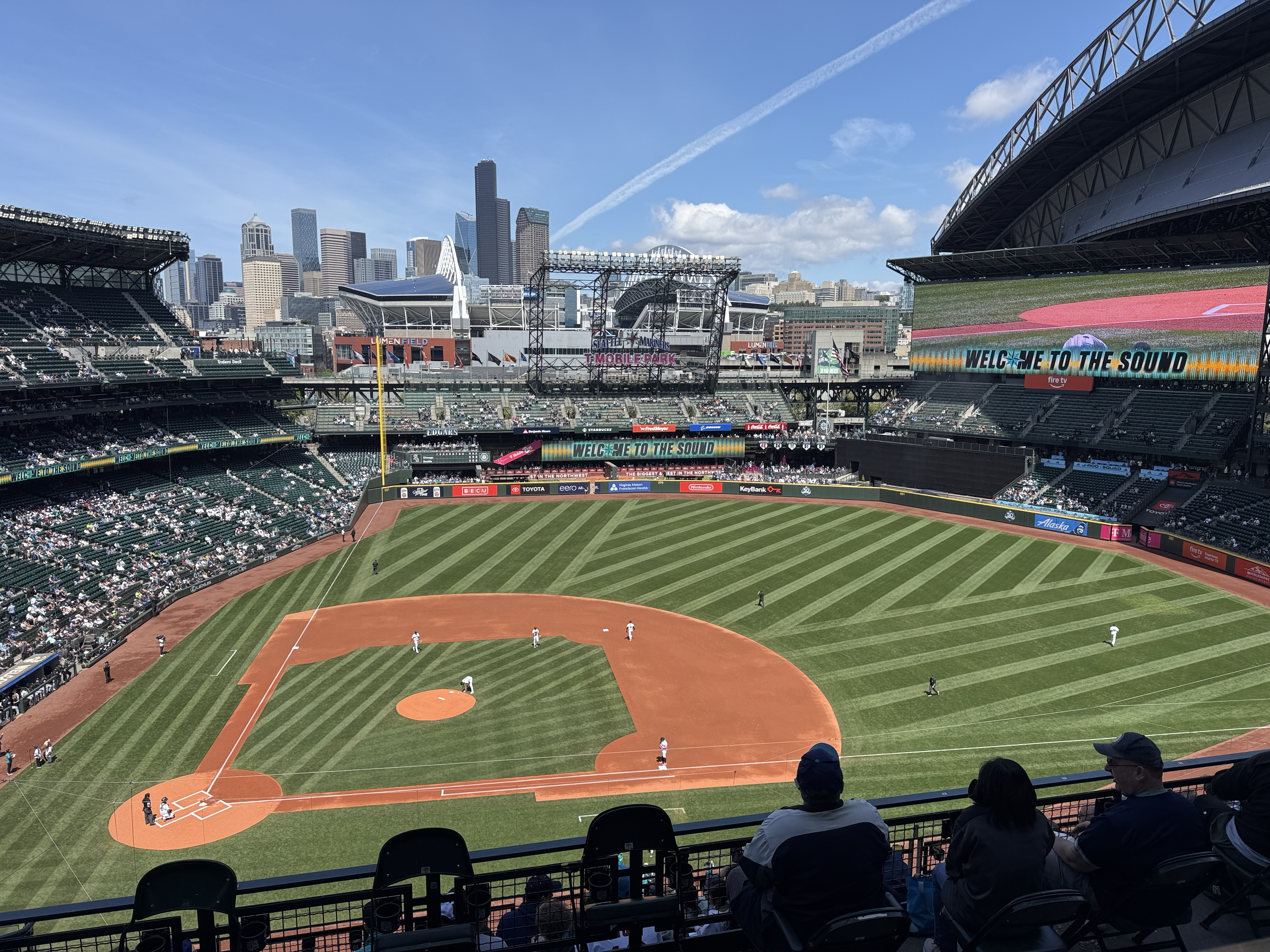
- T-Mobile Park in May 2026
- League: American League
- Division: West
- Ballpark: T-Mobile Park
- City: Seattle, Washington
- Record: 76–86 (.469)
- Divisional place: 3rd
- Owners: Baseball Club of Seattle, LP, represented by CEO John Stanton
- President of baseball operations: Jerry Dipoto
- General manager: Justin Hollander
- Manager: Dan Wilson
- Television: MLB Local Media (Aaron Goldsmith, Jay Buhner, Dave Valle, Angie Mentink, Ryan Rowland-Smith, Bill Krueger, Jen Mueller, Ryon Healy, Brad Adam)
- Radio: ESPN-710; Seattle Mariners Radio Network (Rick Rizzs, Gary Hill Jr., Mark McLemore, Ken Phelps, Angie Mentink, Ryan Rowland-Smith, Shannon Drayer)

The 2026 Seattle Mariners season was the 50th season in franchise history and their 27th full season (28th overall) at T-Mobile Park, their home ballpark in Seattle, Washington.

After reaching the American League Championship Series in 2025, team management and media expected the team to compete for a championship, but the Mariners suffered their first losing season since 2020. The Mariners became the second team in MLB history to play 50 seasons and fail to reach the World Series in the expansion era. With expectations of competing for the franchise's first title, the season was deemed a disappointment by many fans and media members. Manager Dan Wilson left the team at the end of the season.

The Mariners lost on Opening Day on March 26 against the Cleveland Guardians in Seattle. Their season ended on September 27 against the Los Angeles Angels at home, with Seattle finishing in third place in the American League West.

The Mariners retired Randy Johnson's uniform number 51 on May 2. The team previously retired that number in 2025 for Ichiro Suzuki. The Mariners wore a uniform patch commemorating their 50th season. The Mariners unveiled a statue for Suzuki in April and a statue commemorating the 2001 Mariners in September. In August, the team celebrated its 50 seasons with a pre-game ceremony recognizing the top 50 players in franchise history and announced that broadcaster Rick Rizzs would be inducted into the team's hall of fame. Left fielder Randy Arozarena represented the Mariners in the MLB All-Star Game and was named to the All-MLB Second Team and won a Silver Slugger Award after leading the American League (AL) in runs. Second baseman Cole Young won a Gold Glove Award.

The Mariners had several historical blowouts. On August 18, they suffered their worst loss in franchise history, losing 22–0 to the eventual World Series champion Milwaukee Brewers. On August 23, they had their worst home defeat, a 19–2 loss to the Chicago Cubs. On September 12, the Mariners beat the Athletics 19–1, their largest margin of victory in franchise history.

== Offseason ==
Coming off an AL West division title and AL Championship Series appearance, the Mariners acted early in the offseason, re-signing first baseman Josh Naylor, who had been a 2025 mid-season pickup, to a five-year contract in mid-November.

On December 5, the Mariners announced their coaching staff for 2026. Two former coaches left for bench coach jobs, with third base coach Kristopher Negrón joining the Pittsburgh Pirates and bullpen coach Tony Arnerich going to the Cleveland Guardians. Carlos Cardoza, previously the Frisco RoughRiders manager, was named the third base coach, and former Mariner catcher Austin Nola began his coaching career as the bullpen coach. Jake McKinley, formerly the Nevada Wolf Pack coach, was named the field coordinator, replacing Louis Boyd, who took another role with the Mariners. Seattle retained all other coaches from 2025.

The Mariners made two trades to fill areas of need and sent out prospects, acquiring reliever José A. Ferrer from the Washington Nationals for catcher Harry Ford and getting utility player Brendan Donovan from the St. Louis Cardinals for four minor leaguers and a draft pick. The Donovan deal was done in part due to two former Mariners and FanGraphs bloggers, with Dave Cameron, Seattle's senior director of player personnel, reaching out to Jeff Sullivan, a senior analyst with the Tampa Bay Rays, to include the Rays in a three-way trade.

The Mariners made smaller signings to fill lesser roles, adding Rob Refsnyder as a right-handed bat to face lefties and signing Andrew Knizner and Mitch Garver for the backup catcher job.

Pitcher Logan Evans had Tommy John surgery in January 2026, with an expected 12-month recovery.

In January, the team announced that they would wear Seattle Steelheads-inspired uniforms on Sunday home games, replacing their cream alternates.

Longtime broadcaster Rick Rizzs announced in January that he would retire after the season. Fellow broadcaster Angie Mentink suffered a stroke in February. The franchise also changed television broadcast arrangements, shuttering Root Sports Northwest after the 2025 season and moving production to MLB Local Media. The team is broadcasting some Friday games on KING-TV other Pacific Northwest over-the-air television stations and added former player Ryon Healy as a color commentator. The team also announced in February that they would unveil a statue in September depicting Mike Cameron and Mark McLemore honoring the 2001 Mariners team that won 116 games as well as the 25th anniversary of the September 11 attacks.

=== Transactions ===
- November 2, 2025: Josh Naylor, Eugenio Suárez, Caleb Ferguson, and Luke Jackson elected free agency.
- November 3: The Mariners declined Mitch Garver's $12 million mutual option, paying him a $1 million buyout and making him a free agent.
- November 5: Pitcher Cole Wilcox acquired from the Tampa Bay Rays for cash.
- November 6: Jorge Polanco declined a $6 million option, receiving a $750,000 buyout, and elected free agency. The Mariners claimed pitcher Ryan Loutos off waivers from the Washington Nationals.
- November 16: Minor league pitcher Robinson Ortiz traded by the Los Angeles Dodgers to Seattle for minor league pitcher Tyler Gough.
- November 17: Naylor signed a five-year, $92.5 million contract with the Mariners.
- November 18: The Boston Red Sox traded minor league pitcher Alex Hoppe to the Mariners for minor league catcher Luke Heyman. The Mariners designated pitcher Tayler Saucedo for assignment. Saucedo elected free agency two days later.
- November 21: The Mariners non-tendered Trent Thornton and Gregory Santos, making them free agents.
- November 25: Pitcher Casey Lawrence re-signed with Seattle on a minor league contract.
- December 6: The Mariners acquired relief pitcher José A. Ferrer from the Washington Nationals for catcher Harry Ford and pitcher Isaac Lyon.
- December 16: Catcher Andrew Knizner signed a one-year, $1 million contract.
- December 22: Outfielder Rob Refsnyder signed a one-year, $6.25 million contract.
- January 8, 2026: Relief pitcher Michael Rucker signed a minor league contract.
- January 23: Pitcher Cooper Criswell acquired from the New York Mets for cash. Pitcher Jhonathan Díaz designated for assignment. Díaz was sent outright to Triple-A on January 28.
- January 27: The Mariners claimed catcher Jhonny Pereda off waivers from the Minnesota Twins. Reliever Jackson Kowar was designated for assignment and would be claimed by the Twins.
- February 2: Utility player Brendan Donovan acquired from the St. Louis Cardinals for prospects Jurrangelo Cijntje, Tai Peete, Colton Ledbetter, and a competitive balance round B draft pick. The Mariners sent third baseman Ben Williamson to the Rays, who sent another draft pick to St. Louis to complete the deal.
- February 13: Connor Joe signed a minor league contract.
- February 16: Pitcher Josh Simpson acquired from the Miami Marlins for cash. Pitcher Logan Evans placed on the 60-day injured list, recovering from Tommy John surgery.
- February 26: Garver re-signed with Seattle on a minor league contract.

== Spring training ==
Pitchers and catchers reported to the Mariners' spring training facility, the Peoria Sports Complex, between February 9 and 11, with the first spring training game played on February 20, against the San Diego Padres, who also train in Peoria, Arizona.

The Mariners non-roster invitees to spring training included top prospects, such as Colt Emerson, Ryan Sloan, and Kade Anderson; former major leaguers on minor league contracts Dane Dunning, Patrick Wisdom, and Michael Rucker; and returning organizational players including Casey Lawrence, Austin Kitchen, and Guillo Zuñiga.

Pitcher Bryce Miller and shortstop J. P. Crawford dealt with injuries in late February. Both players began the season on the injured list, along with utility player Miles Mastrobuoni. Mitch Garver won the competition for the backup catcher job in spring training, with Andrew Knizner electing free agency.

=== World Baseball Classic ===
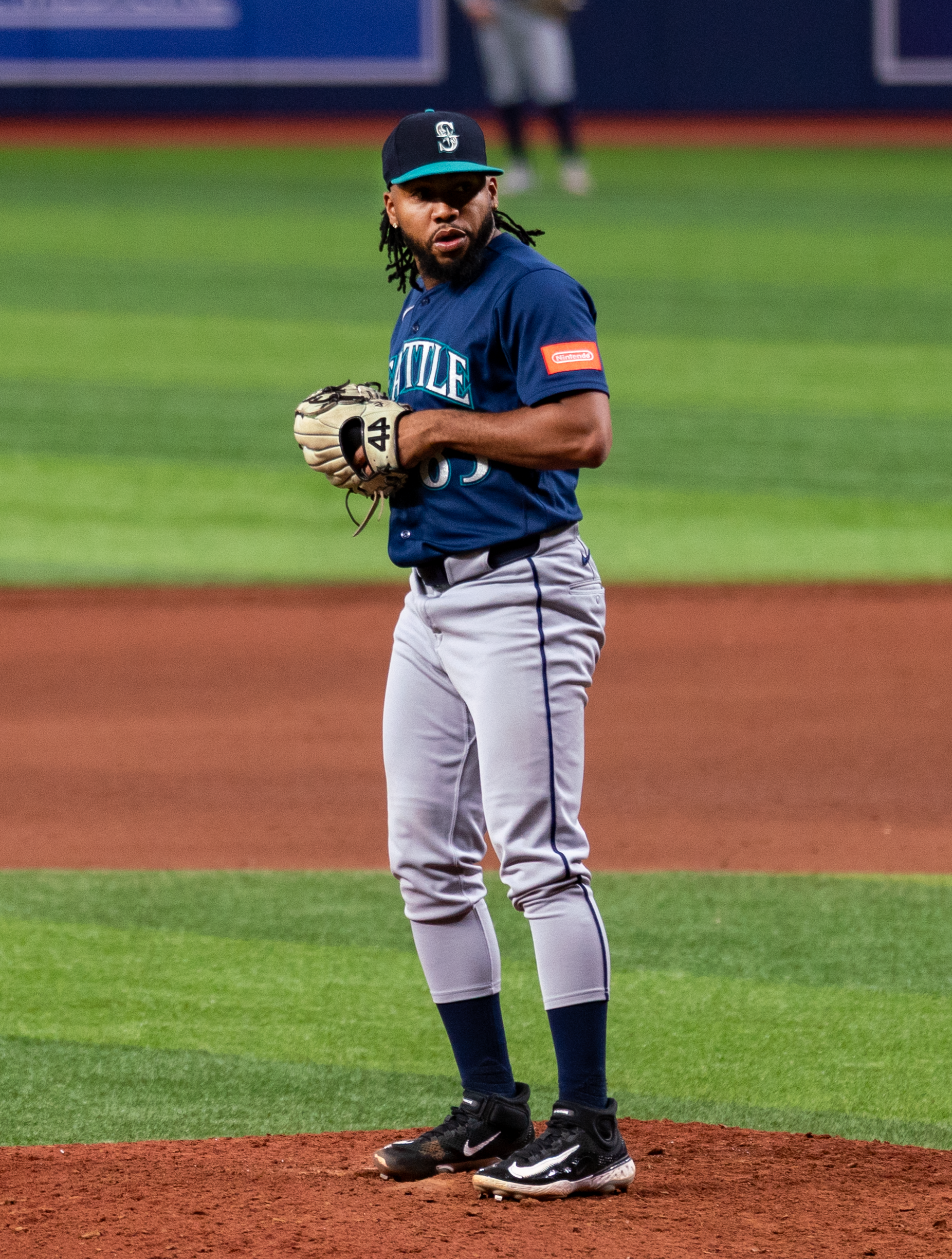
Reliever Eduard Bazardo won the World Baseball Classic with Venezuela.

The Mariners had 16 players selected to play in the 2026 World Baseball Classic (WBC), held during spring training, including six minor leaguers. Outfielders Julio Rodríguez and Randy Arozarena returned to the Dominican Republic and Mexico, respectively, with All-Star closer Andrés Muñoz also playing for Mexico. Cal Raleigh and Gabe Speier committed to the United States prior to the WBC rosters being announced in February. Josh Naylor was the captain for Canada, after previously playing in the 2017 WBC. Reliever Eduard Bazardo pitched for Venezuela. Dominic Canzone and Miles Mastrobuoni joined Italy. South Korea selected minor league signee Dane Dunning, while prospect Michael Arroyo and reliever Guillo Zuñiga joined Colombia. Four other minor league pitchers were chosen by other national teams. Mastrobuoni suffered a calf injury during pool play and returned to Mariners spring training.

During a U.S.–Mexico game on March 10, Arozarena, ahead of his first plate appearance, attempted to shake Raleigh's hand, which Raleigh declined. Naylor made a similar attempt when Canada faced the U.S., though Naylor said after the game that he was joking with Raleigh. Raleigh, who was hitless in the WBC, was benched in the final two games, including facing Rodríguez and the Dominican Republic. Bazardo won the WBC with Venezuela, recording two outs in the championship game win over the U.S.

== Regular season ==
=== Season standings ===
==== American League West ====
AL West
Team	W	L	Pct.	GB	Home	Road
Houston Astros	81	81	.500	—	39‍–‍42	42‍–‍39
Texas Rangers	80	82	.494	1	45‍–‍36	35‍–‍46
Seattle Mariners	76	86	.469	5	43‍–‍38	33‍–‍48
Athletics	64	98	.395	17	32‍–‍49	32‍–‍49
Los Angeles Angels	62	100	.383	19	34‍–‍47	28‍–‍53

==== American League Wild Card ====
Division leaders
Team	W	L	Pct.
Tampa Bay Rays	98	64	.605
Cleveland Guardians	85	77	.525
Houston Astros	81	81	.500

Wild Card teams (Top 3 teams qualify for postseason)
Team	W	L	Pct.	GB
New York Yankees	93	68	.578	+9½
Boston Red Sox	87	75	.537	+3
Chicago White Sox	84	78	.519	—
Texas Rangers	80	82	.494	4
Baltimore Orioles	79	82	.491	4½
Toronto Blue Jays	79	83	.488	5
Minnesota Twins	77	85	.475	7
Detroit Tigers	76	86	.469	8
Seattle Mariners	76	86	.469	8
Kansas City Royals	69	93	.426	15
Athletics	64	98	.395	20
Los Angeles Angels	62	100	.383	22

==== Record against opponents ====
2026 American League record Source: MLB Standings Grid – 2026
Team	ATH	BAL	BOS	CWS	CLE	DET	HOU	KC	LAA	MIN	NYY	SEA	TB	TEX	TOR	NL
Athletics	—	2–4	3–4	1–5	1–5	0–6	6–7	2–5	8–5	3–3	3–3	7–6	0–6	7–6	2–4	19–29
Baltimore	4–2	—	4–9	4–2	3–4	4–2	5–1	5–1	3–3	3–3	3–9	3–4	8–5	2–4	7–6	21–27
Boston	4–3	9–4	—	6–0	3–3	5–2	1–5	5–1	4–2	1–5	6–7	3–3	6–7	3–3	4–9	27–21
Chicago	5–1	2–4	0–6	—	7–6	9–4	2–5	9–4	4–2	8–5	3–4	3–3	2–4	4–2	5–1	21–27
Cleveland	5–1	4–3	3–3	6–7	—	10–3	2–4	7–6	6–0	6–7	2–4	4–3	1–5	2–4	2–4	25–23
Detroit	6–0	2–4	2–5	4–9	3–10	—	2–5	6–7	3–3	5–8	4–2	4–2	4–2	4–2	3–3	24–24
Houston	7–6	1–5	5–1	5–2	4–2	5–2	—	4–2	7–6	2–4	3–3	3–10	2–4	9–4	3–3	21–27
Kansas City	5–2	1–5	1–5	4–9	6–7	7–6	2–4	—	5–1	8–5	0–6	5–1	2–5	1–5	3–3	19–29
Los Angeles	5–8	3–3	2–4	2–4	0–6	3–3	6–7	1–5	—	3–4	3–4	6–7	3–3	8–5	2–4	15–33
Minnesota	3–3	3–3	5–1	5–8	7–6	8–5	4–2	5–8	4–3	—	3–3	2–4	1–5	5–1	4–3	18–30
New York	3–3	9–3	7–6	4–3	4–2	2–4	3–3	6–0	4–3	3–3	—	4–2	6–7	4–2	7–6	27–21
Seattle	6–7	4–3	3–3	3–3	3–4	2–4	10–3	1–5	7–6	4–2	2–4	—	1–5	5–8	2–4	23–25
Tampa Bay	6–0	5–8	7–6	4–2	5–1	2–4	4–2	5–2	3–3	5–1	7–6	5–1	—	4–3	9–4	27–21
Texas	6–7	4–2	3–3	2–4	4–2	2–4	4–9	5–1	5–8	1–5	2–4	8–5	3–4	—	6–1	25–23
Toronto	4–2	6–7	9–4	1–5	4–2	3–3	3–3	3–3	4–2	3–4	6–7	4–2	4–9	1–6	—	24–24

Updated with the results of all games through September 27, 2026.

=== Season summary ===
==== March/April ====
The Mariners lost on Opening Day and split their opening four-game series at home with the Cleveland Guardians, with Emerson Hancock getting nine strikeouts to salvage the series. After Cal Raleigh's walk-off single, the Mariners lost the final two games of their series against the New York Yankees. Following the opening homestand, the team signed top prospect shortstop Colt Emerson to an eight-year, $95 million contract extension, though he remained in the minors. Incumbent shortstop J. P. Crawford came off the injured list.

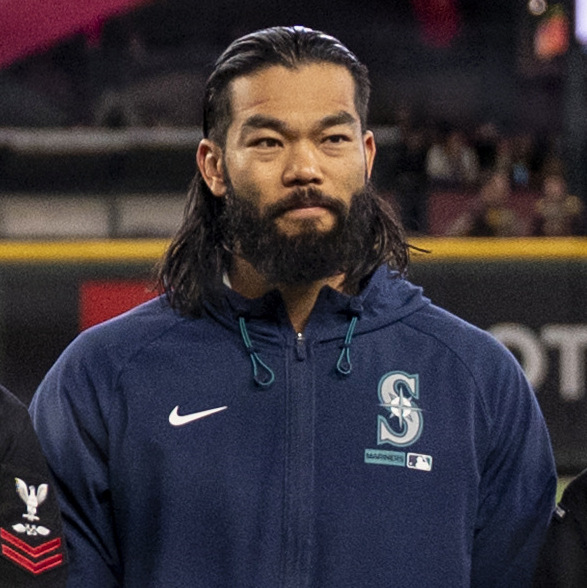
Connor Joe was called up to the Mariners in April.

Seattle offensive struggles continued on their first road trip. After defeating the Anaheim Angels on April 3, the team lost five consecutive games. Right fielder Jo Adell robbed three potential Mariners home runs to preserve a 1–0 Angels win on April 4. The Texas Rangers then swept Seattle. In Texas, outfielder Víctor Robles went on the injured list, replaced by Connor Joe, who made a costly fielding error and was hitless in his Mariners debut.

The Mariners ended their losing streak by sweeping a four-game series against the Houston Astros, scoring six or more runs in each game. Prior to the first game, the Mariners unveiled a statue of Ichiro Suzuki, with the statue's bat breaking during the ceremony. In the second game, Crawford tied a franchise record with his eighth walk-off hit. Cleanup hitter Josh Naylor hit his first two home runs of the season on April 13 to seal the sweep.

The Mariners began another losing streak with their next road game. The San Diego Padres swept the Mariners, taking a lead in the Vedder Cup. Closer Andrés Muñoz blew a four-run lead in the second game, a 7–6 walk-off loss on April 15, with José A. Ferrer taking a blown save. The losing streak reached four games with a shutout home loss to the Rangers before the Mariners won on 7–3 on April 18, with Muñoz earning a one-out save with a game-ending bases loaded strikeout. The Mariners split their homestand, winning two games against the Rangers and one against the Athletics, with the final win coming on a Naylor walk-off single. Reliever Casey Legumina, after allowing three runs and taking a loss on April 20, was designated for assignment then traded to the Tampa Bay Rays.

The Mariners then swept the St. Louis Cardinals in St. Louis. Will Wilson homered in his first at bat with the Mariners in the first game of the series. After losing a rain delayed game to open a series against the Minnesota Twins, Seattle won the final two games, with Julio Rodriguez's first three-double game on April 28 and three RBI by Cole Young the next day. Reliever Matt Brash left the final game of the series after throwing two pitches and went on the injured list with a lat injury.

==== May ====
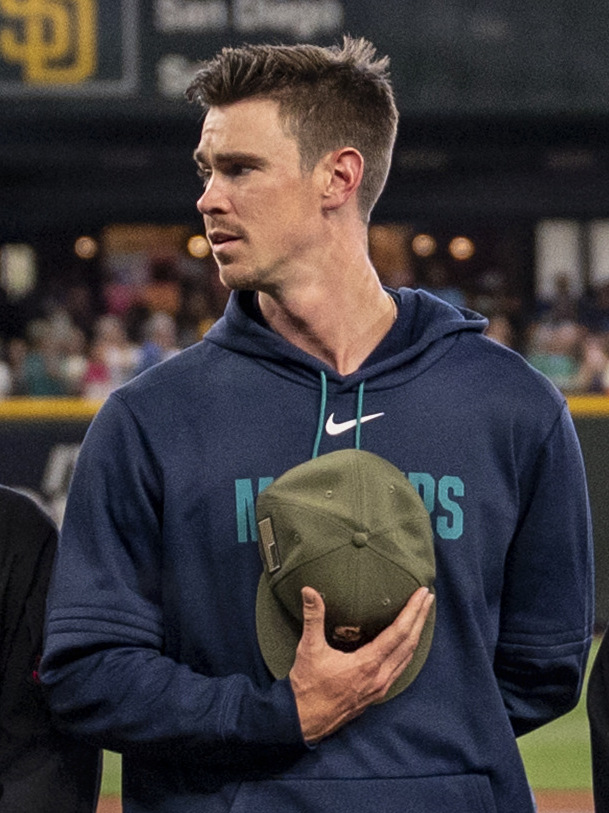
Starting pitcher Emerson Hancock in May. He had a career-high 14 strikeouts on May 2.

The Kansas City Royals swept the Mariners in Seattle to open May, spoiling Randy Johnson's number retirement as well as a 14-strikeout, no-walk performance by Emerson Hancock on May 2. Hancock's strikeout total was the most by an MLB starter since teammate George Kirby struck out 14 in September 2025. After the series, reliever Gabe Speier went on the injured list (IL) with shoulder inflammation. Seattle then dealt the Atlanta Braves their first series loss of the year. Logan Gilbert allowed four solo home runs in the opener, but Luke Raley and J. P. Crawford hit multi-run homers for the comeback win. Bryan Woo, after allowing 13 runs over his previous two starts, threw six shutout innings to close out the series.

Raley hit two home runs, driving in seven runs to power a 12–8 win over the Chicago White Sox in Chicago. However, Seattle lost the last two games of the series, with Eduard Bazardo allowing two runs in the series finale and the team unable to score after loading the bases with no outs in the ninth inning. Seattle then won three out of four games in Houston, with Seattle besting Astros rookie Tatsuya Imai in his second consecutive start facing Seattle. Cal Raleigh, after enduring an 0-for-36 slump, showered with his uniform on, then got two hits in the win on May 12. However, the Mariners' nine-game winning streak over Houston ended with a Zach Cole 10th inning walk-off single the next game, spoiling Bryce Miller's first start of the season. After the series, Raleigh went on the IL for the first time in his career, dealing with an oblique muscle strain. Catcher Jhonny Pereda replaced him on the roster.

The San Diego Padres then swept the Mariners at T-Mobile Park, winning all six Vedder Cup games. Seattle promoted top prospect Colt Emerson on May 17, with Brendan Donovan returning to the IL 10 days after returning from his first IL stint. The Mariners then won two out of three games against the White Sox, with Woo throwing six scoreless innings and Emerson hitting a home run for his first MLB hit in the opening game. In the second game, the Mariners deployed a "piggyback" approach, with Luis Castillo making his first regular season relief appearance following five hitless innings by Miller. Seventh inning solo home runs from Pereda, hitting his first MLB dinger, and Randy Arozarena helped the Mariners win the final game of the series. Matt Brash, in his return from the IL, earned the win. After the series, Víctor Robles returned from the IL, with Connor Joe returning to the minors.

For the second time in May, the Mariners struggled against the Royals. After Seattle won the first game of the series in Kansas City on a Mitch Garver two-run home run, Stephen Kolek threw a shutout. Woo failed to escape the fifth inning in the final game of the series.

Starting with a series in West Sacramento, California, the Mariners then began an eight-game winning streak that vaulted them above .500 for the first time since March and into first place in the AL West for the first time all season. The Mariners swept the Athletics, scoring nine runs twice. Returning home, the Mariners then swept the Arizona Diamondbacks. Speier returned from the IL in West Sacramento, with Nick Davila sent down to the minors. After blowing a 5–1 lead, the Mariners won in 10 innings in the first game of the series. Following another scoreless home start from Woo, the Mariners again needed 10 innings to beat Arizona to finish the sweep, with Robles breaking his bat on a walk-off single.

Julio Rodríguez, usually a slow starter, hit 10 home runs in May, the most in any month in his career. The Mariners starting rotation, with Miller returning, increased to six pitchers, with Castillo and Miller using the "piggyback" twice. Injuries to Raleigh, Donovan, Brash, and Speier opened roster spots for Pereda, Joe, Josh Simpson, and Robinson Ortiz. Emerson and relievers Davila, Alex Hoppe, and Domingo González all made their MLB debuts during the month.

==== June ====
The Mariners won their first two games in June against the New York Mets, extending their winning streak to eight games. In the first game, Cole Young hit a walk-off single for the team's third extra-inning win in four games. New York snapped the winning streak on June 3, with George Kirby losing his third consecutive decision.

Seattle began their longest road trip of the season dropping two out of three games to the Detroit Tigers. In their first meeting since the 2025 AL Division Series, Kerry Carpenter homered off Bryan Woo to power Detroit to the win. Seattle won the middle game of the series with another scoreless Bryce Miller start. Closer Andrés Muñoz blew his fifth save of the season in the final game at Comerica Park. Seattle then split a four game series against the Baltimore Orioles after winning the first two games. Josh Naylor hit a go-ahead grand slam in the first game, a 6–3 win.In the second game, Nick Davila pitched the 10th inning to earn his first MLB save. The win extended Seattle's AL West lead to three games, the largest of the season. Baltimore scored seven runs to win each of the final two games of the series. Miller threw a career-high eight innings to win the opening game against the Washington Nationals, with Dominic Canzone hitting a home run and a triple. During the game, Randy Arozarena injured his left hamstring, going on the injured list several days later. After that 10–2 win, the Mariners failed to score more than three runs in a game for 13 consecutive games, which matched a franchise record and was the longest such streak of offensive futility in MLB since 2016. The streak began with two lopsided losses at Nationals Park.

The Mariners returned to Seattle to face the Orioles, scoring three runs in each game, which was enough to win two out of three games. Cal Raleigh returned from the injured list and hit a two-run single to win the first game, with Logan Gilbert getting a season-high 10 strikeouts. The Mariners added minor leaguer Curtis Washington Jr., who was batting .190 for the Everett AquaSox, to the active roster for the game to replace Arozarena. Washington became a phantom ballplayer when he was sent down the next day, replaced by Connor Joe. Despite having a quality start, Kirby took his fifth consecutive loss in the second game against Baltimore. Woo continued his scoreless streak at home, pitching innings to win the final game of the series. Facing three left-handed Boston Red Sox starters, the Mariners' offense still struggled to score. Ranger Suárez, Connelly Early, and Payton Tolle all threw quality starts, with the Mariners winning only the final game of the series thanks to a one-run, 6 1/3 inning start from Gilbert on June 21. Gilbert was named the AL Player of the Week for his performances against Boston and Baltimore, allowing two runs in 13 1/3 innings pitched with 18 strikeouts.

The Mariners, scoring three runs for the second consecutive game, won the opening game against the Pittsburgh Pirates, with Pittsburgh-native Cole Young hitting a go-ahead home run in his first game at PNC Park. The Mariners mustered one run in each of the final two games of the series, getting blown out 11–1 in the second game, their most lopsided loss of the season. Ohio native Colt Emerson hit a home run in his first game at Progressive Field to power a series-opening win against the Cleveland Guardians. Cleveland won the next two games, though the Mariners scored five runs in the final game, ending their streak of not exceeding three runs in a game. The loss, precipitated by a bullpen collapse in the eighth inning, dropped the Mariners into second place in the AL West for the first time since late May.

The Mariners ended June with two comfortable home wins against the Los Angeles Angels. Young hit two home runs and Kirby pitched eight innings in the opening game. In the second game, Woo set a franchise record with 32 1/3 consecutive scoreless innings pitched at home, which dated back to May 6, before Eduard Bazardo allowed an inherited runner to score for the Angels.

Dominic Canzone led the Mariners offensively, batting .314 with six home runs. He began batting higher in the batting order and facing more left-handed pitchers. Raleigh, in his return from injury, continued to bat under .200 but led the team in walks. Gilbert and Miller led Mariners pitchers, with each topping 30 strikeouts with an ERA under 3.00 as the Mariners continued to use a six-man starting rotation, all of whom had at least one quality start. The Mariners ended June one loss behind the Texas Rangers in the AL West and in the final AL Wild Card spot.

==== July ====
The Mariners lost their playoff position and dropped below .500 in July, playing particularly poorly on the road, going 3–10.

===== Pre-All-Star break =====
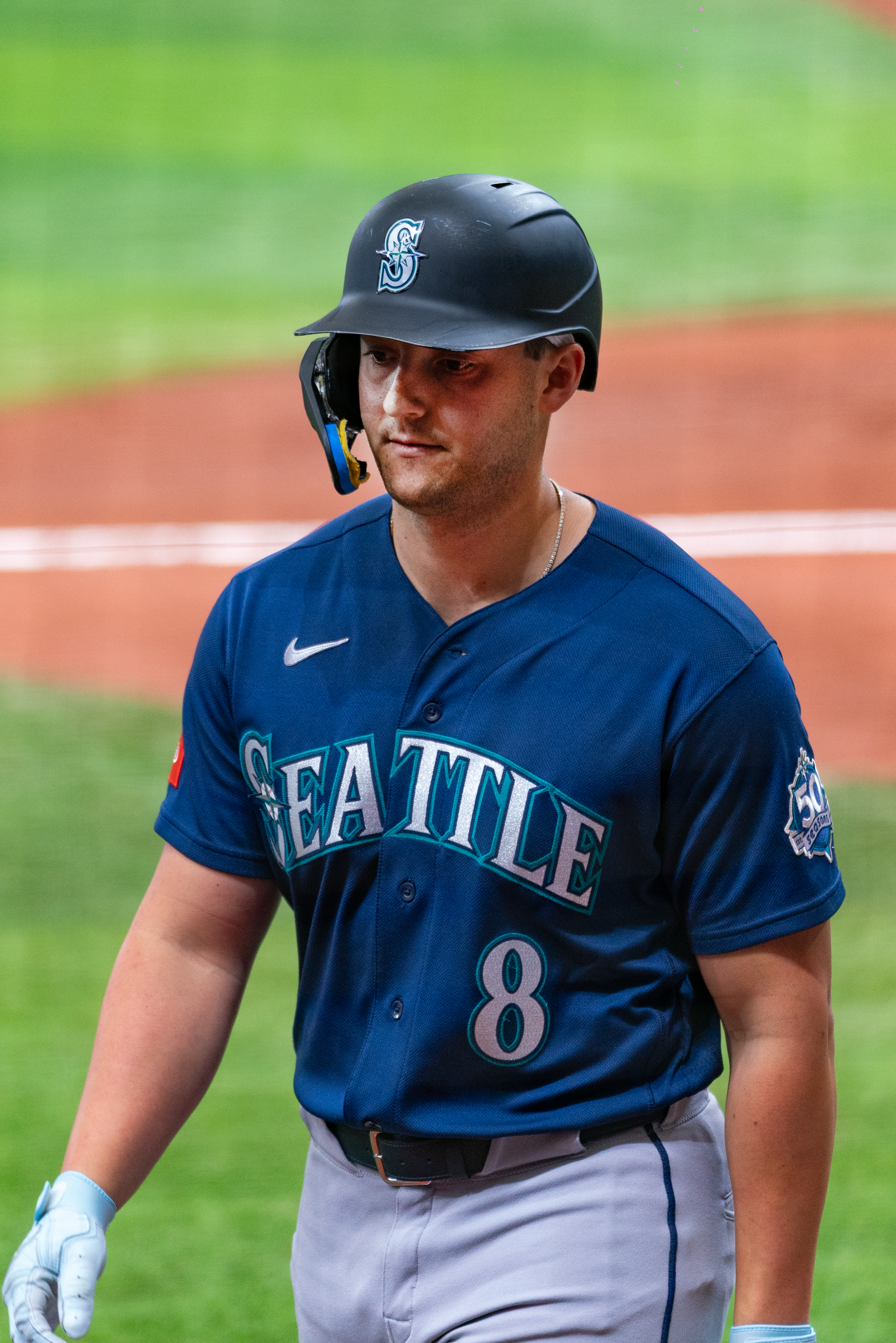
Dominic Canzone in July. He batted third in the lineup most of the month.

The Mariners finished the sweep of the Angels on July 1 to move into a tie for first place in the division. However, center fielder Julio Rodríguez left the game after a Nolan Schanuel throw hit him in the back of his helmet. Rodríguez went on the seven-day concussion injured list. Replacement center fielder Víctor Robles also left the game. The Toronto Blue Jays, behind a strong Dylan Cease start, won the first game in the 2025 ALCS rematch, 2–0. Randy Arozarena lost both of Seattle's Automated Ball-Strike (ABS) System challenges in his first-inning at bat. Before the game, the U.S. men's national soccer team gathered on the field and head coach Mauricio Pochettino threw out the first pitch to manager Dan Wilson. After the scoreless loss, Seattle shut out Toronto the next two games. Arozarena hit a grand slam, Cal Raleigh hit a three-run home run, and Logan Gilbert pitched 7 1/3 innings with seven strikeouts on July 4. In the final game of the series, Mitch Garver hit a two-run home run and Emerson Hancock pitched seven scoreless innings. The Mariners had six different pitchers throw a quality start in consecutive games, the first time that happened in MLB since the Houston Astros in September 2023. On July 5, Arozarena was named to the MLB All-Star Game, his second consecutive selection.

The Mariners lost the first five games of their final road trip before the All-Star break. They lost in 10 innings against the Miami Marlins on July 7. Gabe Speier allowed a game-tying home run to Heriberto Hernández. In the 10th inning, Weston Wilson made a base running error for the Mariners, then Jakob Marsee had a walk-off hit. The Mariners were shut out in the second game, with Cole Young not using an ABS challenge on a called strikeout to end the game. Arozarena and Dominic Canzone homered in an 8–4 loss on July 9 to finish the sweep. Traveling north, the Mariners lost to the Tampa Bay Rays, as Luis Castillo allows three home runs on July 10. Gilbert picked up his 1,000th career strikeout, the fifth player in franchise history to do so, in a 6–1 loss. The Mariners won the final game before the break, with Wilson and Arozarena homering. However, Hancock was hit on his throwing hand by a Yandy Díaz batted ball on the first pitch he threw and was removed in the second inning. The losing road trip dropped the Mariners below .500 and below the Texas Rangers in the AL West at the All-Star break. Arozarena had one single in two at bats in the All-Star Game.

===== Post-All-Star break =====
The Mariners returned home, losing 7–0 to the San Francisco Giants on July 17 before winning the final two games of the series. The next day, Raleigh hit a three-run home run off Giants ace Logan Webb to tie the game, then Rodríguez, in his return from the concussion injured list, hit a walk-off sacrifice fly in the 10th inning. Gilbert struck out 10 to top former Mariner Robbie Ray in the rubber match, as Luke Raley and Young homered off reliever Adrian Houser. Seattle's winning streak reached three as George Kirby pitched six scoreless innings against the Cincinnati Reds. Manager Terry Francona intentionally walked Canzone to have left-handed reliever and former Mariner Caleb Ferguson face the switch-hitting Raleigh, who knocked a grand slam. Seattle lost the final games of the homestand. Chase Burns pitched five scoreless innings on July 21, then Sal Stewart hit a go-ahead three-run home run off Eduard Bazardo to win the final game, spoiling Hancock's quality start.

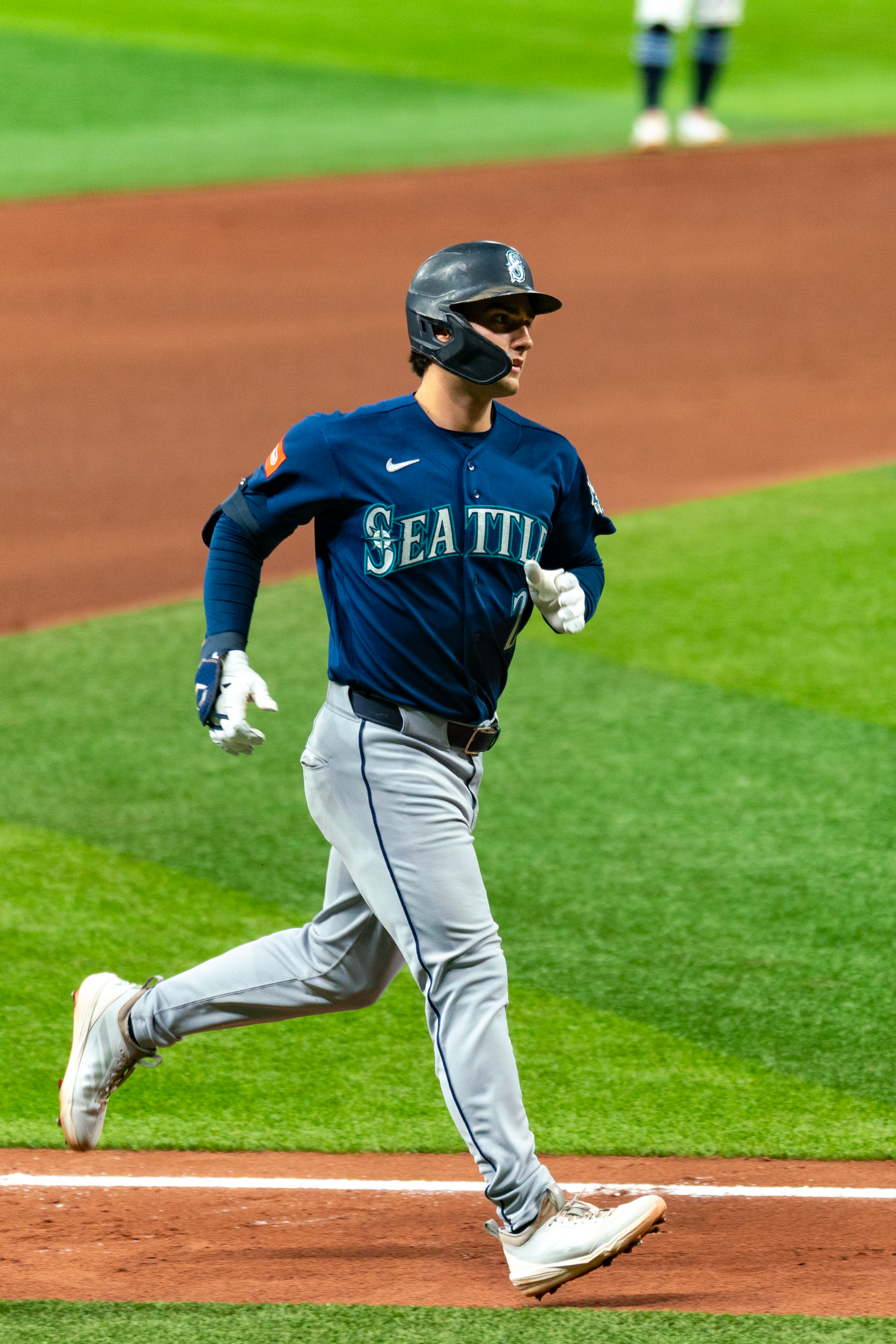
Cole Young was one of the team's top batters in July.

The Mariners traveled to Arlington, trailing the Texas Rangers by half a game, then lost three of four games. In the first game, Bazardo allowed two inherited runners from Bryce Miller to score. In the game, Joc Pederson of the Rangers notched his 1,000th career hit. Bryan Woo then had another poor road start, allowing five runs in the first two innings as Nathan Eovaldi gave up one run in seven innings. The Mariners' lone win in the series came on a Canzone go-ahead three-run home run off Cole Winn followed immediately by an Arozarena home run in the seventh inning on July 26. Kirby allowed seven runs in four innings the next day as Texas took the series. The Mariners mustered one win in a series against the defending World Series champion Los Angeles Dodgers, with Canzone hitting two home runs, including a two-run home run off Alex Vesia in the eighth inning, to win the first game. Rob Refsnyder returned from the injured list and also homered. The next game, Andy Pages had three hits, including a home run, off Hancock. On July 30, Dalton Rushing and former Mariner Teoscar Hernández homered, and Roki Sasaki allowed two runs as the Dodgers took the series.

The Mariners returned home to lose the final game of July to the Minnesota Twins, extending their losing streak to three games. José A. Ferrer and Bazardo both allowed home runs and Luke Keaschall hit a go-ahead double off Ferrer as the bullpen blew the lead.

Arozarena, Canzone, and Young led the Mariners offensively in July. Canzone regularly hit third in the batting order and faced more left-handed pitchers. Josh Naylor led the team with a .274 batting average and six stolen bases but hit no home runs and had four RBI. Refsnyder returned to the team in late July, with Miles Mastrobuoni and Buddy Kennedy leaving the roster. J. P. Crawford went on the injured list with left wrist inflammation at the end of the month.

==== August ====
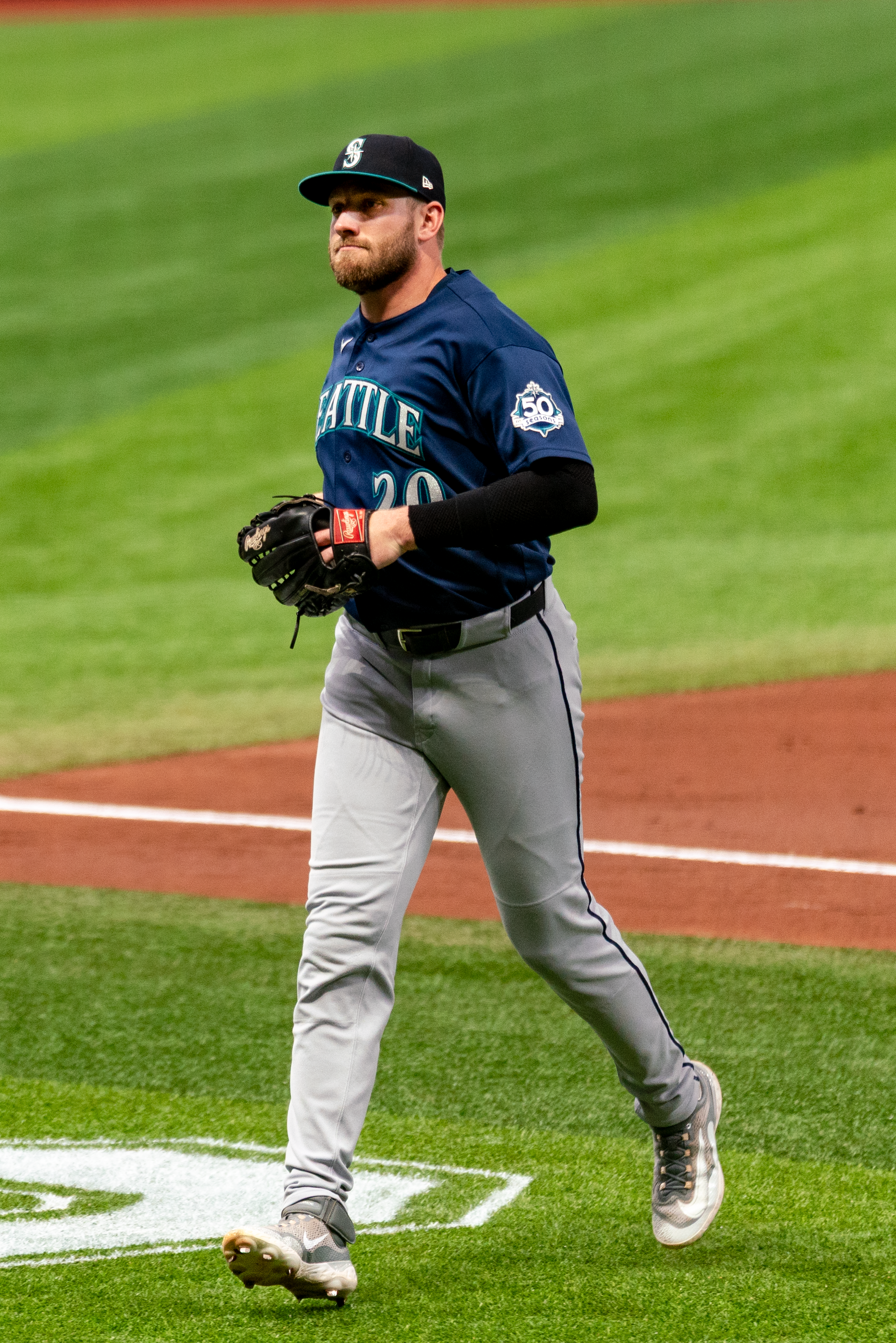
Outfielder Luke Raley in July. He underwent season-ending surgery in August.

Despite several trade deadline acquisitions, the Mariners remained in third place in the AL West and below .500 in August, again playing worse on the road. During the month, Seattle suffered their largest blowout loss and home loss in franchise history.

After losing the opening game of the series to the Twins, the Mariners had two walk-off wins. On August 1, the Mariners capitalized on a defensive miscue by Twins first baseman Royce Lewis during Cal Raleigh's ninth-inning ground out to first base, allowing Randy Arozarena to score the winning run in a 4–3 victory. That day, the Mariners placed Luke Raley on the 10-day injured list for a left forearm strain; it was later announced he would undergo season-ending surgery on his flexor tendon. That night, the Mariners traded Luis Castillo to the Chicago White Sox for relief pitcher Seranthony Domínguez and minor leaguers Nolan Jones and Boston Smith. While there were trade rumors involving George Kirby and Arozarena, president of baseball operations (POBO) Jerry Dipoto said that the Mariners never engaged in advanced negotiations for either. The Mariners won the next day, taking an early lead backed by a Josh Naylor double, an RBI single Cole Young (who had four hits), and a Raleigh home run. Though Kirby pitched 7 scoreless innings, the bullpen gave up the lead when Eduard Bazardo and José A. Ferrer gave up two home runs, followed by Andrés Muñoz giving up a game-tying home run to Luke Keaschall. Muñoz received the win however, after Colt Emerson hit a walk-off single for a 7–6 victory.

On August 3, the Mariners completed their trade deadline by acquiring outfielder Taylor Ward from the Baltimore Orioles for reliever Alex Hoppe and minor leaguers Brock Moore, and Harrison Kreiling. Before the series against the Detroit Tigers, the Mariners released Mitch Garver and Rob Refsnyder to clear roster space for Ward and Brendan Donovan, who returned from the injured list. The Mariners were shut out 8–0 against the Tigers on August 4 after seven scoreless innings by Troy Melton. On August 5, the Mariners won 4–2 after Bryan Woo pitched seven scoreless innings and Julio Rodríguez and Emerson homered. In the 7th inning, Raleigh was hit by pitch from Enmanuel De Jesus in the lower stomach. The next inning, Gabe Speier hit the third batter, Gleyber Torres. Both benches cleared and Speier and manager Dan Wilson were ejected. Both were suspended; Speier for three games (which he appealed) while Wilson was suspended for one game. The Mariners lost the series finale 11–0, shutout from seven innings by Framber Valdez alongside home runs by Dillon Dingler (having one in every game of the series) and All-Star rookie Kevin McGonigle.

The Mariners celebrated 50 seasons of baseball in the next series against the Tampa Bay Rays, though they lost all three games. On August 7, the Mariners lost 2–1 after a pitchers' duel. Drew Rasmussen threw seven shutout innings for Tampa Bay, while Rodríguez provided Seattle's only run with a solo home run in the ninth inning. After the game, the Mariners held an alumni Home Run Derby. Stefen Romero won the contest over current bullpen coach Austin Nola in the finals after participation by Hall of Famer Ichiro Suzuki, All-Star Mike Cameron, Bucky Jacobsen, and broadcasters Ryan Rowland-Smith and Ryon Healy. Before the second game, the Mariners announced the 50 Greatest Mariners Players, also honoring former manager Lou Piniella. The team announced that retiring long-time broadcaster Rick Rizzs would be inducted into the Mariners Hall of Fame in 2027. The Mariners lost another low-scoring game, with Michael Rucker allowing two decisive runs in the sixth inning. Naylor hit two home runs for the Mariners' only scoring. The Rays completed the sweep with Ward scoring the lone run with a first-inning triple. Ian Seymour and three relievers shut down the Mariners, and Liam Hicks hit a bases-loaded double off Ferrer.

The Mariners lost the first two games of the three-game series against the Yankees. On August 13, they won the final game 1–0 after a first-inning home run by Weston Wilson, six scoreless innings by Gilbert, and four successful ABS overturns by catcher Jhonny Pereda. After the game, the Mariners promoted infielder Brock Rodden. The team initially planned to demote Emerson, but the struggling prospect told the team he had been dealing with a wrist injury since spring training, so he was put on the injured list, later having season-ending surgery. After losing the first game of the series against the Astros 7–10, the Mariners won the next two 10–5 and 3–2, winning the series. In the first win on August 15, the Mariners were backed by Cole Young and Brendan Donovan, both having three hits with Young hitting a three-run home run in the 9th inning. The second was backed by homers from Arozarena and Raleigh and six innings pitched by Woo. The Mariners suffered the most lopsided loss in franchise history, losing to the Milwaukee Brewers 22–0 on August 18. Although they rebounded to win the following game 7–5, it was their only win of the three-game series.

On August 21, the Mariners beat the Chicago Cubs 6–5 on a walk-off single by Leo Rivas in the 10th inning. The next day, the Mariners beat the Cubs again, this time 5–4 with leadoff and walk-off home runs by Arozarena. Top pitching prospect Kade Anderson made his MLB debut in the win. Arozarena notched his sixth consecutive 20–20 season, a feat done only by Barry Bonds, Bobby Bonds, Bobby Abreu, and Willie Mays. During batting practice before the game, Donovan was hit in the head by a ball, returning to the injured list with a concussion and missing the rest of the season. The next day, Seattle suffered their biggest home loss in franchise history, falling 19–2. Raleigh hit a career-high three home runs in a series-opening win against the Philadelphia Phillies on August 24. He became the first Mariner to hit three home runs at T-Mobile Park. He homered the next game as George Kirby struck out nine to clinch a series win. Seattle was held to two hits in their final August home game, as Kyle Schwarber hit his 40th home run of the season in a 6–0 win.

The Mariners lost their final four road games of August. They were swept in three games by the Toronto Blue Jays. On August 28, Hancock lost what would be his final game of the season, losing to Dylan Cease and suffering an injury after falling down while attempting to field a ground ball. The Blue Jays came from behind to win the second game 4–3, as Anderson could not finish the fifth inning. Max Scherzer had 10 strikeouts to clinch the sweep, passing former Mariner Gaylord Perry in career strikeouts. Seattle lost the opening game against the Boston Red Sox, with Cooper Criswell allowing a 10th inning walk-off to his former team. During the game, Boston starter Payton Tolle fielded a ground ball and bear hugged Dominic Canzone to record an out.

Raleigh was named the AL Player of the Week for the final week of August, batting .389 with five home runs. He paced the Mariners with nine home runs in August but batted .195. Arozarena had eight homers and batted .250, second only to Naylor's .293 among regulars. Naylor had a nine-game hitting streak that lasted through August 19, also stealing his 25th base that day. Newcomer Ward batted .121 in his first month with the team. Logan Gilbert and Woo were the only starters with ERAs under 4 in August. Bryce Miller went 0–3 with a 9.00 ERA in four starts. Top prospect Anderson had a 4.50 ERA in two starts, pitching 10 innings under a pitch count. Muñoz was uneven, blowing four saves in nine opportunities. Anderson and Rodden made their MLB debuts in August.

==== September ====
In the season's final month, the Mariners remained in third place in the AL West and clinched their first losing record since 2020. They were eliminated from the postseason in the final week of the season.

As rosters expanded on September 1, the Mariners called up prospect Lázaro Montes and signed submarining reliever Hoby Milner. Connor Joe was designated for assignment. Montes made an immediate impact, homering in his MLB debut, a 9–6 win over the Boston Red Sox. The next day, the Mariners won the series at Fenway Park, 8–3, scoring in two four-run innings.

At the start of the next homestand, the Mariners unveiled a statue featuring Mike Cameron and Mark McLemore, honoring the 2001 Mariners clinching the AL West title and carrying an American flag following the team's first game after the September 11th attacks. The Mariners lost the first three games at home against the Athletics. In the first game, Julio Rodríguez stole three bases to become the first MLB player with at least 20 home runs and 20 stolen bases in each of his first five seasons. In the second game, Logan Gilbert set a franchise record by allowing four home runs in one inning. He gave up seven runs but struck out 10 batters. Seattle won the final game of the series, with Bryan Woo throwing a career-high eight scoreless innings. Prospect Michael Arroyo made his MLB debut. The Mariners lost the first game of a series against the Texas Rangers, who hit three home runs. Montes hit a 474-foot home run, the longest home run in Seattle since at least 2015 and tied for the longest home run in MLB in 2026, according to Statcast. Kade Anderson earned his first MLB win the next night. Gilbert earned his final win of the season on September 10 to take the series.

The Athletics walked off the Mariners twice in West Sacramento. Former Mariner Donovan Walton hit two-run, 10th inning home run off Eduard Bazardo to open the series. On September 12, the Mariners won 19–1, their largest margin of victory in franchise history. Arroyo had his first three MLB hits, including a home run, and Woo allowed one run in six innings. Lawrence Butler hit a two-run walk-off home run off Andrés Muñoz, his second long ball of the game, to seal the series. The Mariners then lost their first two games against the Los Angeles Angels. The second loss, on September 15, was 82nd loss of the season, ensuring their first losing record since 2020. Gilbert allowed a go-ahead home run to Josh Lowe in the 2–1 game. Both Rodríguez and J. P. Crawford wore Roberto Clemente's uniform number 21, on Roberto Clemente Day. Seattle beat former Mariner starter Yusei Kikuchi to end the series, with Cal Raleigh getting three RBI on two hits. The Mariners won their final road games of the series against the Colorado Rockies. Montes hit a go-ahead ninth inning home run to win the first game, 5–4. The Rockies won the second game, as Jose A. Ferrar allowed two inherited runners to score and gave up two runs in the seventh inning, wasting early home runs from Raleigh and Randy Arozarena. Anderson pitched a career-high seven scoreless innings on September 20 to win the series, with Canzone driving in both of Seattle's runs in a 2–1 win.

The Houston Astros shut out the Mariners in the first game of Seattle's final homestand, with Gilbert allowing four runs in four innings. On September 23, Josh Naylor hit a 10th-inning, bases-loaded walk-off single of closer Josh Hader to briefly extend the team's chances of making the postseason. However, a Rangers win on September 24 eliminated the Mariners from playoff contention. That day, infielder Brock Rodden went on the injured list with a season-ending left knee injury, with Leo Rivas returning. The Mariners lost the opening game of the their final series, with Woo allowing the Angels to score go-ahead runs after he convinced manager Dan Wilson to leave him in the game. The Mariners dubbed the final three games of the season Rick Rizzs Weekend, honoring their retiring broadcaster. To open the festivities, Seattle suffered their final loss of the season, with Bryce Miller losing his 10th game of the season. On September 26, Naylor stole his 30th base, becoming the first first baseman with 30 steals in an MLB season since George Sisler in 1922 and only the third first baseman with 10 home runs and 30 steals consecutive seasons, following Sisler and Fred Merkle. Wilson announced he would not return as manager following the final game of the season.

=== Game log ===
Legend
	Mariners win
	Mariners loss
	Postponement
	Eliminated from playoff spot
**Bold**	Mariners team member

2026 Game Log: 76–86 (Home: 43–38; Road: 33–48)
March/April: 16–16 (Home: 10–7; Road: 6–9)

#	Date	Opponent	Score	Win	Loss	Save	Attendance	Record	Streak
1	March 26	Guardians	4–6	Brogdon (1–0)	**Speier** (0–1)	Smith (1)	44,938	0–1	L1
2	March 27	Guardians	5–1	**Kirby** (1–0)	Williams (0–1)	—	36,987	1–1	W1
3	March 28	Guardians	5–6 (10)	Smith (1–0)	**Muñoz** (0–1)	Brogdon (1)	43,283	1–2	L1
4	March 29	Guardians	8–0	**Hancock** (1–0)	Cecconi (0–1)	**Criswell** (1)	30,800	2–2	W1
5	March 30	Yankees	2–1	**Brash** (1–0)	Blackburn (0–1)	—	27,291	3–2	W2
6	March 31	Yankees	0–5	Fried (2–0)	**Gilbert** (0–1)	—	32,790	3–3	L1
7	April 1	Yankees	3–5	Schlittler (2–0)	**Kirby** (1–1)	Bednar (3)	23,415	3–4	L2
8	April 3	@ Angels	3–1 (10)	**Muñoz** (1–1)	Suter (0–1)	**Speier** (1)	44,931	4–4	W1
9	April 4	@ Angels	0–1	Kochanowicz (1–0)	**Hancock** (1–1)	Romano (3)	44,084	4–5	L1
10	April 5	@ Angels	7–8 (11)	Anderson (1–0)	**Speier** (0–2)	—	27,712	4–6	L2
11	April 6	@ Rangers	1–2	Beeks (1–0)	**Gilbert** (0–2)	Junis (1)	23,901	4–7	L3
12	April 7	@ Rangers	2–3	Eovaldi (1–2)	**Kirby** (1–2)	Junis (2)	22,411	4–8	L4
13	April 8	@ Rangers	0–3	Gore (2–0)	**Woo** (0–1)	Winn (1)	20,997	4–9	L5
14	April 10	Astros	9–6	**Hancock** (2–1)	Weiss (0–2)	**Muñoz** (1)	44,468	5–9	W1
15	April 11	Astros	8–7	**Muñoz** (2–1)	Abreu (0–2)	—	43,294	6–9	W2
16	April 12	Astros	6–1	**Gilbert** (1–2)	Bolton (0–1)	—	29,071	7–9	W3
17	April 13	Astros	6–2	**Kirby** (2–2)	Burrows (1–3)	—	18,648	8–9	W4
18	April 14	@ Padres	1–4	King (2–1)	**Woo** (0–2)	Miller (5)	38,152	8–10	L1
19	April 15	@ Padres	6–7	Jacob (1–0)	**Muñoz** (2–2)	—	46,095	8–11	L2
20	April 16	@ Padres	2–5	Buehler (1–1)	**Castillo** (0–1)	Miller (6)	39,008	8–12	L3
21	April 17	Rangers	0–5	Collyer (1–0)	**Gilbert** (1–3)	—	28,253	8–13	L4
22	April 18	Rangers	7–3	**Kirby** (3–2)	Eovaldi (2–3)	**Muñoz** (2)	45,552	9–13	W1
23	April 19	Rangers	5–2	**Woo** (1–2)	Gore (2–2)	**Muñoz** (3)	35,474	10–13	W2
24	April 20	Athletics	4–6	Harris (2–0)	**Legumina** (0–1)	Kuhnel (4)	20,203	10–14	L1
25	April 21	Athletics	2–5	Lopez (2–1)	**Bazardo** (0–1)	Perkins (1)	19,092	10–15	L2
26	April 22	Athletics	5–4	**Muñoz** (3–2)	Kuhnel (0–1)	—	15,704	11–15	W1
27	April 24	@ Cardinals	3–2	**Kirby** (3–2)	Pallante (2–2)	**Muñoz** (4)	31,304	12–15	W2
28	April 25	@ Cardinals	11–9	**Brash** (2–0)	O'Brien (3–1)	**Muñoz** (5)	27,236	13–15	W3
29	April 26	@ Cardinals	3–2	**Bazardo** (1–1)	Romero (0–1)	**Ferrer** (1)	30,780	14–15	W4
30	April 27	@ Twins	4–11	Prielipp (1–0)	**Castillo** (0–2)	—	14,160	14–16	L1
31	April 28	@ Twins	7–1	**Bazardo** (2–1)	Ryan (2–3)	—	17,821	15–16	W1
32	April 29	@ Twins	5–3	**Criswell** (1–0)	Orze (0–1)	**Muñoz** (6)	20,051	16–16	W2

May: 15–13 (Home: 7–8; Road: 8–5)

#	Date	Opponent	Score	Win	Loss	Save	Attendance	Record	Streak
33	May 1	Royals	6–7	Lynch IV (1–0)	**Ferrer** (0–1)	Erceg (8)	36,384	16–17	L1
34	May 2	Royals	2–3 (10)	Strahm (1–0)	**Criswell** (1–1)	Erceg (9)	42,794	16–18	L2
35	May 3	Royals	1–4	Bubic (3–1)	**Castillo** (0–3)	Lynch IV (1)	39,408	16–19	L3
36	May 4	Braves	5–4	**Gilbert** (2–3)	Kinley (3–2)	**Muñoz** (7)	26,934	17–19	W1
37	May 5	Braves	2–3	Suárez (3–0)	**Muñoz** (3–3)	Iglesias (6)	27,128	17–20	L1
38	May 6	Braves	3–1	**Woo** (2–2)	Pérez (2–2)	**Ferrer** (2)	23,648	18–20	W1
39	May 8	@ White Sox	12–8	**Hancock** (3–1)	Burke (2–3)	—	23,011	19–20	W2
40	May 9	@ White Sox	1–6	Kay (2–1)	**Castillo** (0–4)	—	25,438	19–21	L1
41	May 10	@ White Sox	1–2	Hudson (1–0)	**Bazardo** (2–2)	Domínguez (9)	19,247	19–22	L2
42	May 11	@ Astros	3–1	**Kirby** (5–2)	Lambert (2–3)	**Muñoz** (8)	27,012	20–22	W1
43	May 12	@ Astros	10–2	**Woo** (3–2)	Imai (1–1)	—	28,829	21–22	W2
44	May 13	@ Astros	3–4 (10)	Abreu (2–2)	**Hoppe** (0–1)	—	27,540	21–23	L1
45	May 14	@ Astros	8–3	**Castillo** (1–4)	Burrows (2–5)	—	24,398	22–23	W1
46	May 15	Padres	0–2	Vásquez (5–1)	**Hancock** (3–2)	Miller (14)	43,349	22–24	L1
47	May 16	Padres	4–7	Buehler (3–2)	**Gilbert** (2–4)	Estrada (1)	44,207	22–25	L2
48	May 17	Padres	3–8	Giolito (1–0)	**Kirby** (5–3)	—	40,365	22–26	L3
49	May 18	White Sox	6–1	**Woo** (4–2)	Schultz (2–3)	—	31,409	23–26	W1
50	May 19	White Sox	1–2	Hudson (2–1)	**Castillo** (1–5)	Taylor (1)	28,837	23–27	L1
51	May 20	White Sox	5–4	**Brash** (3–0)	Newcomb (0–1)	**Ferrer** (3)	24,492	24–27	W1
52	May 22	@ Royals	2–0	**Bazardo** (3–2)	Mears (2–3)	**Muñoz** (9)	18,842	25–27	W2
53	May 23	@ Royals	0–5	Kolek (3–0)	**Kirby** (5–4)	—	25,544	25–28	L1
54	May 24	@ Royals	6–8	Lugo (2–4)	**Woo** (4–3)	—	25,014	25–29	L2
55	May 25	@ Athletics	9–2	**Miller** (1–0)	Civale (5–2)	—	11,194	26–29	W1
56	May 26	@ Athletics	4–1	**Hancock** (4–2)	Jump (0–1)	—	9,539	27–29	W2
57	May 27	@ Athletics	9–1	**Gilbert** (3–4)	Springs (3–6)	—	9,612	28–29	W3
58	May 29	Diamondbacks	7–6 (10)	**Criswell** (2–1)	Morillo (1–2)	—	44,198	29–29	W4
59	May 30	Diamondbacks	5–1	**Woo** (5–3)	Nelson (2–4)	—	44,364	30–29	W5
60	May 31	Diamondbacks	3–2 (10)	**Castillo** (2–5)	Loáisiga (1–2)	—	41,897	31–29	W6

June: 13–14 (Home: 7–4; Road: 6–10)

#	Date	Opponent	Score	Win	Loss	Save	Attendance	Record	Streak
61	June 1	Mets	3–2 (10)	**Speier** (1–2)	Minter (0–1)	—	23,037	32–29	W7
62	June 2	Mets	8–3	**Gilbert** (4–4)	Tong (1–1)	—	28,329	33–29	W8
63	June 3	Mets	1–7	Peralta (4–4)	**Kirby** (5–5)	—	27,969	33–30	L1
64	June 5	@ Tigers	3–7	Valdez (3–4)	**Woo** (5–4)	—	32,591	33–31	L2
65	June 6	@ Tigers	4–0	**Miller** (2–0)	Montero (2–4)	—	32,606	34–31	W1
66	June 7	@ Tigers	4–5	Vest (2–4)	**Muñoz** (3–4)	—	34,893	34–32	L1
67	June 8	@ Orioles	6–3	**Hancock** (5–2)	Gibson (1–1)	**Muñoz** (10)	12,377	35–32	W1
68	June 9	@ Orioles	6–5 (10)	**Ferrer** (1–1)	Garcia (3–1)	**Davila** (1)	14,728	36–32	W2
69	June 10	@ Orioles	2–7	Young (5–1)	**Kirby** (5–6)	—	13,483	36–33	L1
70	June 11	@ Orioles	5–7	Wells (1–1)	**Woo** (5–5)	Kittredge (1)	15,776	36–34	L2
71	June 12	@ Nationals	10–2	**Miller** (3–0)	Littell (6–5)	—	22,226	37–34	W1
72	June 13	@ Nationals	3–8	Cavalli (4–4)	**Castillo** (2–6)	—	30,004	37–35	L1
73	June 14	@ Nationals	1–10	Mikolas (2–5)	**Hancock** (5–3)	—	27,264	37–36	L2
74	June 16	Orioles	3–1	**Gilbert** (5–4)	Young (5–2)	**Muñoz** (11)	27,396	38–36	W1
75	June 17	Orioles	3–5	Bradish (4–7)	**Kirby** (5–7)	—	28,068	38–37	L1
76	June 18	Orioles	3–0	**Woo** (6–5)	Baz (4–7)	**Muñoz** (12)	43,053	39–37	W1
77	June 19	Red Sox	2–6	Suárez (3–3)	**Miller** (3–1)	—	45,775	39–38	L1
78	June 20	Red Sox	1–5	Early (6–5)	**Hancock** (5–4)	—	45,663	39–39	L2
79	June 21	Red Sox	3–1	**Gilbert** (6–4)	Tolle (3–5)	**Muñoz** (13)	45,577	40–39	W1
80	June 23	@ Pirates	3–2	**Kirby** (6–7)	Keller (5–5)	**Muñoz** (14)	16,015	41–39	W2
81	June 24	@ Pirates	1–11	Ashcraft (7–3)	**Woo** (6–6)	Mlodzinski (2)	18,750	41–40	L1
82	June 25	@ Pirates	1–5	Chandler (3–7)	**Miller** (3–2)	—	24,367	41–41	L2
83	June 26	@ Guardians	3–1	**Castillo** (3–6)	Herrin (0–3)	**Muñoz** (15)	32,832	42–41	W1
84	June 27	@ Guardians	3–4	Cecconi (4–6)	**Gilbert** (6–5)	Smith (25)	33,309	42–42	L1
85	June 28	@ Guardians	5–6	Festa (2–1)	**Rucker** (0–1)	Smith (26)	27,934	42–43	L2
86	June 29	Angels	6–2	**Kirby** (7–7)	Johnson (1–3)	—	37,100	43–43	W1
87	June 30	Angels	8–3	**Woo** (7–6)	Soriano (8–5)	—	32,372	44–43	W2

July: 9–15 (Home: 6–5; Road: 3–10)

#	Date	Opponent	Score	Win	Loss	Save	Attendance	Record	Streak
88	July 2	Angels	1–0	**Miller** (4–2)	Ureña (5–7)	**Muñoz** (16)	36,019	45–43	W3
89	July 3	Blue Jays	0–2	Cease (5–4)	**Castillo** (3–7)	Varland (18)	45,391	45–44	L1
90	July 4	Blue Jays	11–0	**Gilbert** (7–5)	Bieber (0–1)	—	41,181	46–44	W1
91	July 5	Blue Jays	4–0	**Hancock** (6–4)	Yesavage (4–4)	—	37,415	47–44	W2
92	July 7	@ Marlins	5–6 (10)	Gibson (2–0)	**Rucker** (0–2)	—	8,660	47–45	L1
93	July 8	@ Marlins	0–2	Phillips (2–3)	**Kirby** (7–8)	Fairbanks (13)	10,545	47–46	L2
94	July 9	@ Marlins	4–8	Junk (4–5)	**Miller** (4–3)	—	7,815	47–47	L3
95	July 10	@ Rays	2–7	Martinez (8–2)	**Castillo** (3–8)	—	15,568	47–48	L4
96	July 11	@ Rays	1–6	Jax (5–6)	**Gilbert** (7–6)	—	22,597	47–49	L5
97	July 12	@ Rays	8–2	**Ferrer** (2–1)	Seymour (6–2)	—	24,297	48–49	W1
**96th All-Star Game in Philadelphia, PA**
98	July 17	Giants	0–7	Roupp (7–8)	**Miller** (4–4)	—	42,595	48–50	L1
99	July 18	Giants	4–3 (10)	**Ferrer** (3–1)	Smith (0–2)	—	43,485	49–50	W1
100	July 19	Giants	6–3	**Gilbert** (8–6)	Houser (2–7)	**Muñoz** (17)	36,204	50–50	W2
101	July 20	Reds	8–0	**Kirby** (8–8)	Abbott (5–6)	—	35,929	51–50	W3
102	July 21	Reds	2–4	Burns (12–1)	**Castillo** (3–9)	Pagán (8)	35,239	51–51	L1
103	July 22	Reds	3–5	Singer (5–9)	**Bazardo** (3–3)	Pagán (9)	38,236	51–52	L2
104	July 24	@ Rangers	4–5	Gray (5–0)	**Miller** (4–5)	Latz (20)	33,478	51–53	L3
105	July 25	@ Rangers	1–7	Eovaldi (10–8)	**Woo** (7–7)	—	34,006	51–54	L4
106	July 26	@ Rangers	6–4	**Speier** (2–2)	Winn (5–3)	**Muñoz** (18)	29,496	52–54	W1
107	July 27	@ Rangers	3–7	Rocker (4–8)	**Kirby** (8–9)	—	27,683	52–55	L1
108	July 28	@ Dodgers	7–6	**Ferrer** (4–1)	Stewart (0–1)	**Muñoz** (19)	51,686	53–55	W1
109	July 29	@ Dodgers	2–4	Lauer (6–5)	**Hancock** (6–5)	Díaz (5)	46,065	53–56	L1
110	July 30	@ Dodgers	2–6	Sasaki (5–5)	**Woo** (7–8)	—	52,378	53–57	L2
111	July 31	Twins	3–5	Funderburk (2–1)	**Ferrer** (4–2)	Gómez (14)	43,489	53–58	L3

August: 11–16 (Home: 7–7; Road: 4–9)

#	Date	Opponent	Score	Win	Loss	Save	Attendance	Record	Streak
112	August 1	Twins	4–3	**Muñoz** (4–4)	Morris (4–3)	—	41,423	54–58	W1
113	August 2	Twins	7–6	**Muñoz** (5–4)	Gómez (2–1)	—	41,710	55–58	W2
114	August 4	Tigers	0–8	Melton (7–1)	**Hancock** (6–6)	—	35,752	55–59	L1
115	August 5	Tigers	4–2	**Woo** (8–8)	Hanifee (0–1)	**Muñoz** (20)	40,743	56–59	W1
116	August 6	Tigers	0–11	Valdez (7–7)	**Miller** (4–6)	—	30,323	56–60	L1
117	August 7	Rays	1–2	Rasmussen (11–5)	**Gilbert** (8–7)	Baker (33)	39,468	56–61	L2
118	August 8	Rays	2–3	Matz (5–4)	**Rucker** (0–3)	Baker (34)	41,351	56–62	L3
119	August 9	Rays	1–4	Seymour (5–4)	**Hancock** (6–7)	Matz (1)	35,839	56–63	L4
120	August 11	@ Yankees	1–4	Hill (4–2)	**Rucker** (0–4)	Bednar (27)	41,407	56–64	L5
121	August 12	@ Yankees	5–10	Blackburn (4–2)	**Speier** (2–3)	—	41,714	56–65	L6
122	August 13	@ Yankees	1–0	**Gilbert** (9–7)	Fried (4–4)	**Muñoz** (21)	41,842	57–65	W1
123	August 14	@ Astros	7–10 (10)	De Los Santos (2–3)	**Muñoz** (5–5)	—	30,582	57–66	L1
124	August 15	@ Astros	10–5	**Hancock** (7–7)	Wesneski (2–1)	—	34,664	58–66	W1
125	August 16	@ Astros	3–2	**Woo** (9–8)	Brown (3–3)	**Muñoz** (22)	27,971	59–66	W2
126	August 18	@ Brewers	0–22	Harrison (10–3)	**Miller** (4–7)	—	36,870	59–67	L1
127	August 19	@ Brewers	7–5	**Gilbert** (10–7)	May (6–8)	**Muñoz** (23)	34,564	60–67	W1
128	August 20	@ Brewers	4–7	Patrick (7–4)	**Kirby** (8–10)	Megill (23)	35,909	60–68	L1
129	August 21	Cubs	6–5 (10)	**Domínguez** (5–3)	Zeferjahn (4–4)	—	46,018	61–68	W1
130	August 22	Cubs	5–4	**Rucker** (1–4)	Webb (6–3)	—	45,681	62–68	W2
131	August 23	Cubs	2–19	Civale (6–7)	**Miller** (4–8)	—	44,649	62–69	L1
132	August 24	Phillies	9–2	**Gilbert** (11–7)	Wheeler (10–5)	—	35,293	63–69	W1
133	August 25	Phillies	4–1	**Kirby** (9–10)	Nola (5–10)	**Muñoz** (24)	37,600	64–69	W2
134	August 26	Phillies	0–6	Luzardo (12–5)	**Woo** (9–9)	—	33,642	64–70	L1
135	August 28	@ Blue Jays	1–8	Cease (9–5)	**Hancock** (7–8)	—	41,910	64–71	L2
136	August 29	@ Blue Jays	3–4	Soriano (11–7)	**Ferrer** (4–3)	Varland (31)	41,512	64–72	L3
137	August 30	@ Blue Jays	0–7	Scherzer (2–7)	**Gilbert** (11–8)	—	42,039	64–73	L4
138	August 31	@ Red Sox	8–9 (10)	Chapman (3–4)	**Criswell** (2–2)	—	37,487	64–74	L5

September: 12–12 (Home: 6–7; Road: 6–5)

#	Date	Opponent	Score	Win	Loss	Save	Attendance	Record	Streak
139	September 1	@ Red Sox	9–6	**Woo** (10–9)	Páez (0–1)	—	35,758	65–74	W1
140	September 2	@ Red Sox	8–3	**Criswell** (3–2)	Sandoval (1–4)	—	33,922	66–74	W2
141	September 3	Athletics	4–7	Blewett (1–0)	**Anderson** (0–1)	Harris (14)	27,368	66–75	L1
142	September 4	Athletics	6–7	Basso (1–2)	**Gilbert** (11–9)	Harris (15)	34,134	66–76	L2
143	September 5	Athletics	2–6	Springs (4–13)	**Kirby** (9–11)	—	40,950	66–77	L3
144	September 6	Athletics	2–0	**Woo** (11–9)	Jump (6–10)	**Muñoz** (25)	36,867	67–77	W1
145	September 8	Rangers	5–10	Quantrill (8–5)	**Miller** (4–9)	—	35,476	67–78	L1
146	September 9	Rangers	3–2	**Anderson** (1–1)	Bradford (0–5)	**Muñoz** (26)	21,565	68–78	W1
147	September 10	Rangers	4–3	**Gilbert** (12–9)	Junis (1–3)	**Muñoz** (27)	24,784	69–78	W2
148	September 11	@ Athletics	5–6 (10)	Roycroft (2–0)	**Bazardo** (3–4)	—	8,682	69–79	L1
149	September 12	@ Athletics	19–1	**Woo** (12–9)	Jump (6–11)	—	10,289	70–79	W1
150	September 13	@ Athletics	7–8	Alvarado (5–3)	**Muñoz** (5–6)	—	9,171	70–80	L1
151	September 14	@ Angels	4–6	Detmers (6–8)	**Anderson** (1–2)	Joyce (5)	28,311	70–81	L2
152	September 15	@ Angels	1–2	Johnson (5–8)	**Gilbert** (12–10)	Watson (3)	30,906	70–82	L3
153	September 16	@ Angels	7–2	**Vargas** (1–0)	Kikuchi (1–6)	—	38,906	71–82	W1
154	September 18	@ Rockies	5–4	**Vargas** (2–0)	Romano (0–4)	**Muñoz** (28)	40,203	72–82	W2
155	September 19	@ Rockies	3–5	Mejía (4–6)	**Ferrer** (4–4)	Bernardino (4–4)	34,457	72–83	L1
156	September 20	@ Rockies	2–1	**Anderson** (2–2)	Sugano (12–11)	**Bazardo** (1)	33,751	73–83	W1
157	September 22	Astros	0–7	Ullola (1–0)	**Gilbert** (12–11)	—	33,382	73–84	L1
158	September 23	Astros	6–5 (10)	**Criswell** (4–2)	Hader (4–2)	—	24,802	74–84	W1
159	September 24	Angels	4–6	Rodriguez (5–8)	**Woo** (12–10)	Watson (4)	31,032	74–85	L1
160	September 25	Angels	5–7	Detmers (7–8)	**Miller** (4–10)	—	40,678	74–86	L2
161	September 26	Angels	8–4	**Vargas** (3–0)	Farris (1–4)	—	40,308	75–86	W1
162	September 27	Angels	7–3	**Bazardo** (4–4)	Kikuchi (1–7)	—	44,761	76–86	W2

== 2026 roster ==
2026 Seattle Mariners
Roster
Pitchers: 13 Kade Anderson; 83 Eduard Bazardo; 47 Matt Brash; 58 Luis Castillo; 88 Cooper Criswell; 82 Nick Davila; 74 Jhonathan Díaz; 58 Seranthony Domínguez; 45 José A. Ferrer; 36 Logan Gilbert; 46 Domingo González; 26 Emerson Hancock; 48 Alex Hoppe; 68 George Kirby; 64 Casey Legumina; 50 Bryce Miller; 41 Hoby Milner; 75 Andrés Muñoz; 38 Michael Rucker; 37 Josh Simpson; 55 Gabe Speier; 62 José Suárez; 59 Troy Taylor; 54 Carlos Vargas; 43 Cole Wilcox; 22 Bryan Woo	Catchers: 18 Mitch Garver; 5 Jhonny Pereda; 29 Cal Raleigh; Infielders: 96 Michael Arroyo; 1 Ryan Bliss; 3 J. P. Crawford; 33 Brendan Donovan; 4 Colt Emerson; 39 Buddy Kennedy; 21 Miles Mastrobuoni; 12 Josh Naylor; 76 Leo Rivas; 90 Brock Rodden; 31 Weston Wilson; 7 Will Wilson; 35 Patrick Wisdom; 2 Cole Young	Outfielders: 56 Randy Arozarena; 8 Dominic Canzone; 9 Connor Joe; 99 Lázaro Montes; 20 Luke Raley; 30 Rob Refsnyder; 10 Víctor Robles; 44 Julio Rodríguez; 27 Taylor Ward; Other batters: 17 Stuart Fairchild	Manager: 6 Dan Wilson; Coaches: 14 Manny Acta (bench); 66 Fleming Baez (bullpen catcher); 40 Trent Blank (director of pitching strategy); 57 Carlos Cardoza (third base); 80 Danny Farquhar (assistant pitching); 16 Perry Hill (infield); 11 Edgar Martínez (director of hitting strategy); 84 Jake McKinley (field coordinator); 60 Austin Nola (bullpen); 95 Justin Novak (bullpen catcher); -- Ed Paparella (Hitting Coordinator); 33 Kevin Seitzer (hitting); 32 Pete Woodworth (pitching); 53 Eric Young Jr. (first base)

== Player stats ==
= Indicates team leader

= Indicates American League leader

=== Batting ===
Note: G = Games played; AB = At bats; R = Runs scored; H = Hits; 2B = Doubles; 3B = Triples; HR = Home runs; RBI = Runs batted in; SB = Stolen bases; BB = Walks; AVG = Batting average; SLG = Slugging average

Player	G	AB	R	H	2B	3B	HR	RBI	SB	BB	AVG	SLG
Josh Naylor	152	597	58	156	23	0	10	57	30	45	.261	.350
Julio Rodríguez	150	596	69	147	26	0	22	71	22	47	.247	.401
Cole Young	160	577	76	142	19	4	17	66	4	44	.246	.381
Randy Arozarena	154	572	113	161	34	2	26	79	26	68	.281	.484
Dominic Canzone	146	477	60	126	28	4	23	77	2	48	.264	.484
Cal Raleigh	126	451	49	82	15	0	23	69	2	72	.182	.368
J.P. Crawford	116	412	54	91	12	0	14	40	1	64	.221	.352
Luke Raley	95	262	28	59	9	1	15	39	1	15	.225	.439
Colt Emerson	69	221	24	42	6	1	8	23	3	15	.190	.335
Brendan Donovan	39	137	12	38	7	1	3	15	1	15	.277	.409
Victor Robles	65	133	15	34	3	2	0	9	10	9	.256	.308
Mitch Garver	50	126	17	22	3	0	4	15	1	22	.175	.294
Weston Wilson	54	125	18	24	4	0	3	11	5	12	.192	.296
Leo Rivas	51	124	11	19	3	1	0	11	2	16	.153	.194
Rob Refsnyder	53	114	9	16	1	0	4	11	0	8	.140	.254
Jhonny Pereda	31	90	12	27	2	0	2	8	0	9	.300	.389
Taylor Ward	32	88	7	11	0	1	0	7	0	12	.125	.148
Brock Rodden	30	61	8	12	3	1	0	4	0	10	.197	.279
Lázaro Montes	21	52	7	11	2	0	4	11	0	7	.212	.481
Patrick Wisdom	19	47	3	5	1	0	1	4	0	3	.106	.191
Connor Joe	21	39	2	7	2	0	1	3	2	6	.179	.308
Michael Arroyo	15	35	5	13	2	0	1	4	2	5	.371	.514
Miles Mastrobuoni	13	26	3	5	0	0	0	1	0	2	.192	.192
Buddy Kennedy	5	10	2	1	1	0	0	0	0	1	.100	.200
Ryan Bliss	3	8	0	1	0	0	0	1	0	1	.125	.125
Will Wilson	2	5	1	1	0	0	1	2	0	1	.200	.800
Stuart Fairchild	1	0	1	0	0	0	0	0	0	0	.---	.---
Totals	162	5385	664	1253	206	18	182	638	114	557	.233	.379

=== Pitching ===
Note: W = Wins; L = Losses; ERA = Earned run average; G = Games pitched; GS = Games started; SV = Saves; IP = Innings pitched; H = Hits allowed; R = Runs allowed; ER = Earned runs allowed; BB = Walks allowed; SO = Strikeouts

Player	W	L	ERA	G	GS	SV	IP	H	R	ER	BB	SO
Logan Gilbert	12	11	3.73	32	32	0	186.0	153	77	77	49	205
George Kirby	9	11	4.33	30	30	0	174.2	197	89	84	47	148
Bryan Woo	12	10	4.01	30	30	0	173.0	152	84	77	39	175
Emerson Hancock	7	8	3.57	25	25	0	138.2	126	56	55	32	126
Bryce Miller	4	10	4.17	22	21	0	118.2	100	60	55	38	119
Luis Castillo	3	9	5.06	20	17	0	99.2	107	65	56	32	86
Eduard Bazardo	4	4	4.01	73	0	1	67.1	73	34	30	25	70
José A. Ferrer	4	4	4.18	73	0	3	64.2	75	33	30	20	54
Andrés Muñoz	5	6	4.24	61	0	28	57.1	46	29	27	24	89
Gabe Speier	2	3	2.93	54	0	1	46.0	35	17	15	15	45
Michael Rucker	1	4	5.56	37	0	0	43.2	39	31	27	17	50
Cooper Criswell	4	2	3.32	37	0	1	40.2	41	18	15	16	31
Kade Anderson	2	2	3.79	7	7	0	35.2	35	15	15	9	32
Alex Hoppe	0	1	5.79	24	0	0	28.0	27	21	18	11	34
Nick Davila	0	0	4.94	24	0	1	27.1	24	17	15	13	13
Cole Wilcox	0	0	4.00	23	0	0	27.0	27	13	12	17	28
Seranthony Domínguez	1	0	3.04	24	0	0	23.2	18	8	8	8	18
Carlos Vargas	3	0	4.74	16	0	0	19.0	16	10	10	4	17
Matt Brash	3	0	0.54	20	0	0	16.2	8	2	1	6	15
Casey Legumina	0	1	4.63	8	0	0	11.2	15	6	6	3	9
Domingo González	0	0	4.70	5	0	0	7.2	9	4	4	5	5
Josh Simpson	0	0	9.82	8	0	0	7.1	11	8	8	4	10
Hoby Milner	0	0	4.26	6	0	0	6.1	8	3	3	1	7
Troy Taylor	0	0	9.00	2	0	0	3.0	4	3	3	2	2
José Suárez	0	0	4.50	1	0	0	2.0	2	1	1	2	3
Jhonathan Díaz	0	0	6.75	1	0	0	1.1	2	1	1	0	1
Victor Robles	0	0	27.00	1	0	0	1.0	5	3	3	1	0
Leo Rivas	0	0	63.00	1	0	0	1.0	9	9	7	1	0
Weston Wilson	0	0	27.00	1	0	0	1.0	5	3	3	0	0
Jhonny Pereda	0	0	54.00	1	0	0	0.1	3	2	2	0	0
Totals	76	86	4.20	162	162	35	1430.1	1372	722	668	441	1392

== Awards and honors ==
- Cole Young: American League (AL) Gold Glove Award
- Randy Arozarena: MLB All-Star Game, All-MLB Second Team, Silver Slugger Award, AL runs leader
- Logan Gilbert: AL Player of the Week, June 15–21
- Cal Raleigh: AL Player of the Week, August 24–30

=== 50 Greatest Players ===
As part of celebrating their 50th season, the Mariners announced the "50 Greatest Mariners Players", as selected by Mariners staff, former players, fans, and Seattle media. The unranked list included eight players on the 2026 team, including the recently traded Luis Castillo. During the team's August pre-game ceremony unveiling the top 50 players, the final four players revealed on the list were the players whose numbers were retired by the team, Ken Griffey Jr., Randy Johnson, Edgar Martínez, and Ichiro Suzuki. At the event, Lou Piniella, who has the most wins managing the franchise, was also recognized, and the team announced that broadcaster Rick Rizzs would be inducted into the team's hall of fame.

==== Starting pitchers ====
- Floyd Bannister, 1979–1982
- Jim Beattie, 1980–1986
- Luis Castillo, 2022–2026
- Freddy García, 1999–2004
- Logan Gilbert, 2021–2026
- Erik Hanson, 1988–1993
- Félix Hernández, 2005–2019
- Hisashi Iwakuma, 2012–2017
- Randy Johnson, 1989–1998
- George Kirby, 2022–2026
- Mark Langston, 1984–1989
- Mike Moore, 1982–1988
- Jamie Moyer, 1996–2006
- James Paxton, 2013–2018, 2021
- Joel Piñiero, 2000–2006
- Bryan Woo, 2022–2026

==== Relief pitchers ====
- Norm Charlton, 1993, 1995–1997, 2001
- Mike Jackson, 1988–1991, 1996
- Andrés Muñoz, 2021–2026
- J. J. Putz, 2003–2008
- Arthur Rhodes, 2000–2003, 2008
- Kazuhiro Sasaki, 2000–2003

==== Catchers ====
- Cal Raleigh, 2021–2026
- Dave Valle, 1984–1993
- Dan Wilson, 1994–2005

==== Infielders ====
- Adrián Beltré, 2005–2009
- Bret Boone, 1992–1993, 2001–2005
- Robinson Canó, 2014–2018
- J. P. Crawford, 2019–2026
- Julio Cruz, 1977–1983
- Alvin Davis, 1984–1991
- John Olerud, 2000–2004
- Harold Reynolds, 1983–1992
- Alex Rodriguez, 1994–2000
- Kyle Seager, 2011–2021

==== Outfielders ====
- Phil Bradley, 1983–1987
- Jay Buhner, 1988–2001
- Mike Cameron, 2000–2003
- Ken Griffey Jr., 1989–1999, 2009–2010
- Franklin Gutiérrez, 2009–2013, 2015–2016
- Mitch Haniger, 2017–2022, 2024
- Dave Henderson, 1981-1986
- Raúl Ibañez, 1996–2000, 2004–2008, 2013
- Ruppert Jones, 1977–1979
- Julio Rodríguez, 2022–2026
- Ichiro Suzuki, 2001–2012, 2018–2019

==== Utility players ====
- Bruce Bochte, 1978–1982
- Mark McLemore, 2000–2003

==== Designated hitters ====
- Nelson Cruz, 2015–2018
- Edgar Martínez, 1987–2004

== Farm system ==
Level	Team	League	Manager
AAA	Tacoma Rainiers	Pacific Coast League	John Russell
AA	Arkansas Travelers	Texas League	Rich Thompson
High-A	Everett AquaSox	Northwest League	Ryan Scott
A	Inland Empire 66ers	California League	Luis Caballero
Rookie	ACL Mariners	Arizona Complex League	Hecmart Nieves
Foreign Rookie	DSL Mariners	Dominican Summer League	Luis Matias

The Mariners had a new Single-A affiliate in 2026, as Diamond Baseball Holdings moved the Modesto Nuts, which the company bought from the Mariners, after the 2025 season to San Bernardino to become the Inland Empire 66ers.

Top pitching prospects Kade Anderson and Ryan Sloan were selected for the All-Star Futures Game. Anderson and Lázaro Montes were named the Texas League pitcher and player of the month, respectively, for June. Anderson had a 1.06 ERA in 18 starts in Double-A, the second-lowest ERA by a pitcher with at least 90 innings pitched at Double-A and/or Triple-A since 1963. After the season, Anderson won Minor League Baseball's Pitching Prospect of the Year and Debut of the Year awards and Baseball America's Minor League Pitcher of the Year. He also won the Texas League Pitcher of the Year Award.

During the 2026 MLB draft, the team selected infielder Ace Reese in the first round and outfielder Jake Brown, Anderson's former college teammate, in the second round.

The Mariners' two lowest-level affiliates, the Arizona Complex League Mariners and Dominican Summer League (DSL) Mariners, each won their respective divisions. The DSL Mariners lost in the pool round of the DSL Cup. The Peoria Javelinas, which included prospects from the Mariners and several other teams, won the Arizona Fall League Championship.
