= Alex Hoppe =

American baseball player (born 1998)

Baltimore Orioles – No. 26
- Pitcher
- Born: December 17, 1998 (age 27); Davenport, Iowa, U.S.
- Bats: Right Throws: Right

MLB debut
- April 27, 2026, for the Seattle Mariners

MLB statistics (through 2026 season)
- Win–loss record: 1–1
- Earned run average: 4.43
- Strikeouts: 47
- Stats at Baseball Reference

Teams
- Seattle Mariners (2026); Baltimore Orioles (2026–present)

Alex Kevin Hoppe (/ˈhɒpiː/ HOP-ee; born December 17, 1998) is an American professional baseball pitcher for the Baltimore Orioles of Major League Baseball (MLB). He has previously played in MLB for the Seattle Mariners. He made his MLB debut in 2026.

== Career ==
=== Boston Red Sox ===
Hoppe attended Unity Christian High School in Fulton, Illinois, and the University of North Carolina at Greensboro, where he played college baseball for the UNC Greensboro Spartans. He was selected by the Boston Red Sox in the sixth round of the 2022 Major League Baseball draft.

=== Seattle Mariners ===
On November 18, 2025, the Red Sox traded Hoppe to the Seattle Mariners in exchange for catcher Luke Heyman; the Mariners subsequently added him to the 40-man roster to protect him from the Rule 5 draft. Hoppe was optioned to the Triple-A Tacoma Rainiers to begin the 2026 season. On April 21, the Mariners promoted Hoppe to the major leagues for the first time. He made his major league debut on April 27, allowing three earned runs and recording three strikeouts in 1 2/3 innings pitched against the Minnesota Twins.

=== Baltimore Orioles ===
On August 3, 2026, the Mariners traded Hoppe and minor league pitchers Brock Moore and Harrison Kreiling to the Baltimore Orioles in exchange for outfielder Taylor Ward. He was credited with his first MLB win in an eleven-inning 7–5 away victory over the New York Mets on 15 September.
