= Ryan Sloan =

American baseball player (born 2006)

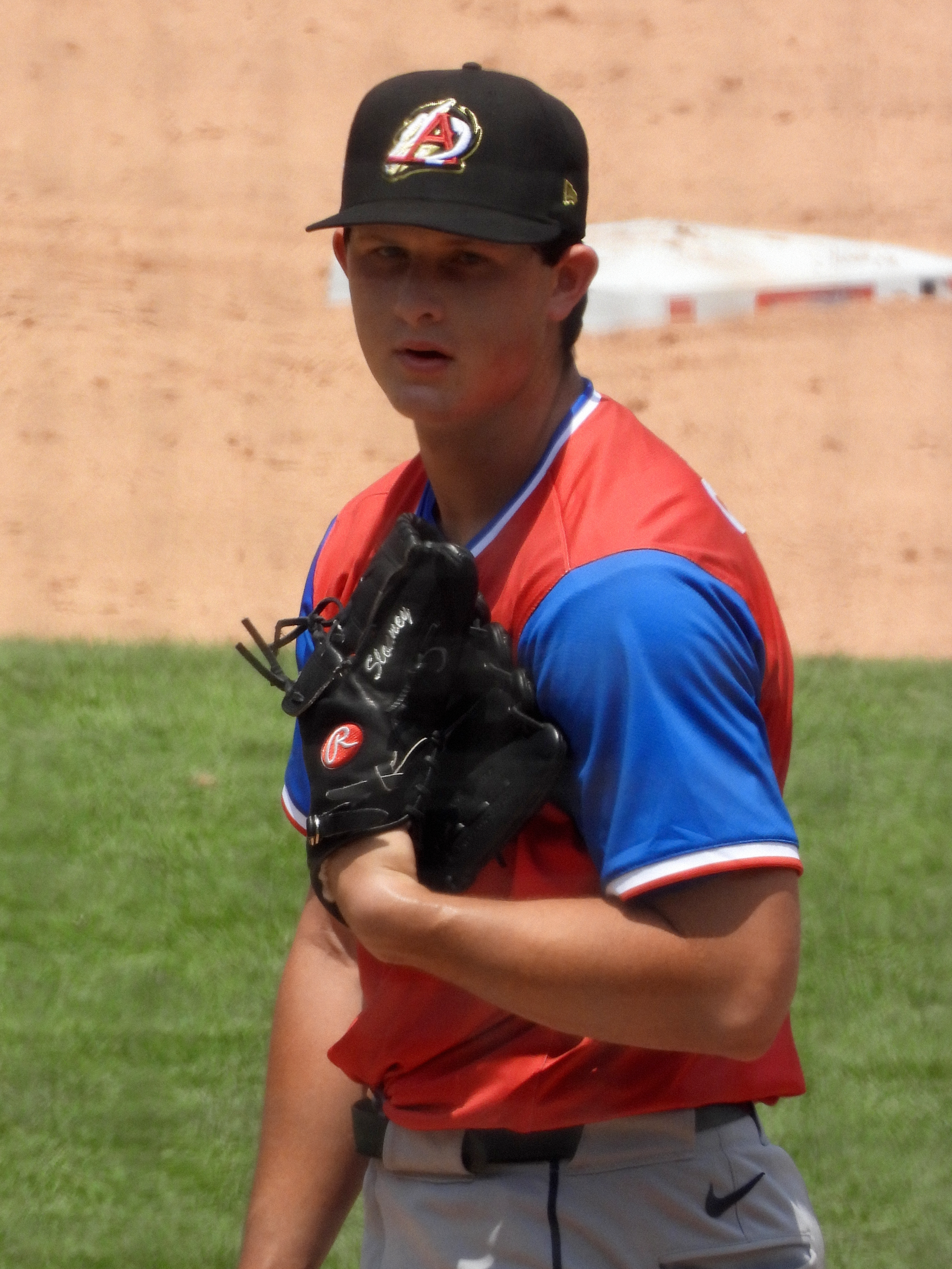
- Sloan pitching for the American League Futures in 2026

Seattle Mariners
- Pitcher
- Born: January 29, 2006 (age 20); Aurora, Illinois
- Bats: Right Throws: Right
- Stats at Baseball Reference

Ryan Leslie Sloan (born January 29, 2006) is an American professional baseball pitcher in the Seattle Mariners organization. He was drafted by the Mariners 55th overall in the 2024 Major League Baseball draft.

== Amateur career ==
Sloan attended York Community High School in Elmhurst, Illinois where he played baseball. As a junior in 2023, he posted a 5–1 record with 97 strikeouts over 53 innings. He threw a no-hitter in York's Super Sectional game. As a senior in 2024, Sloan went 2–3 with a 0.30 ERA and ninety strikeouts over 46 innings. He was named the Illinois Gatorade Baseball Player of the Year. He committed to play college baseball at Wake Forest University.

== Professional career ==
Sloan was considered a top prospect for the 2024 Major League Baseball draft after being ranked 16th by Perfect Game for the Class of 2024. He was selected 55th overall by the Seattle Mariners. Sloan signed with the Mariners on a $3 million contract on July 15, 2024.

Sloan made his professional debut in 2025 with the Single-A Modesto Nuts. In June 2025, he was the 89th ranked prospect in the MLB and the ninth ranked prospect for the Mariners. In August, he was promoted to the High-A Everett AquaSox before undergoing a season-ending eye procedure. Over 21 starts between the two teams, Sloan went 2–4 with a 3.73 ERA and 90 strikeouts over 82 innings. The Mariners named him their Minor League Pitcher of the Year. Sloan was assigned to the Double-A Arkansas Travelers for the 2026 season. He was selected to represent the Mariners at the 2026 All-Star Futures Game alongside Kade Anderson. With Arkansas, Sloan made 22 starts and went 4–4 with a 3.73 ERA and 128 strikeouts over 101 1/3 innings.
