= Weston Wilson =

American baseball player (born 1994)

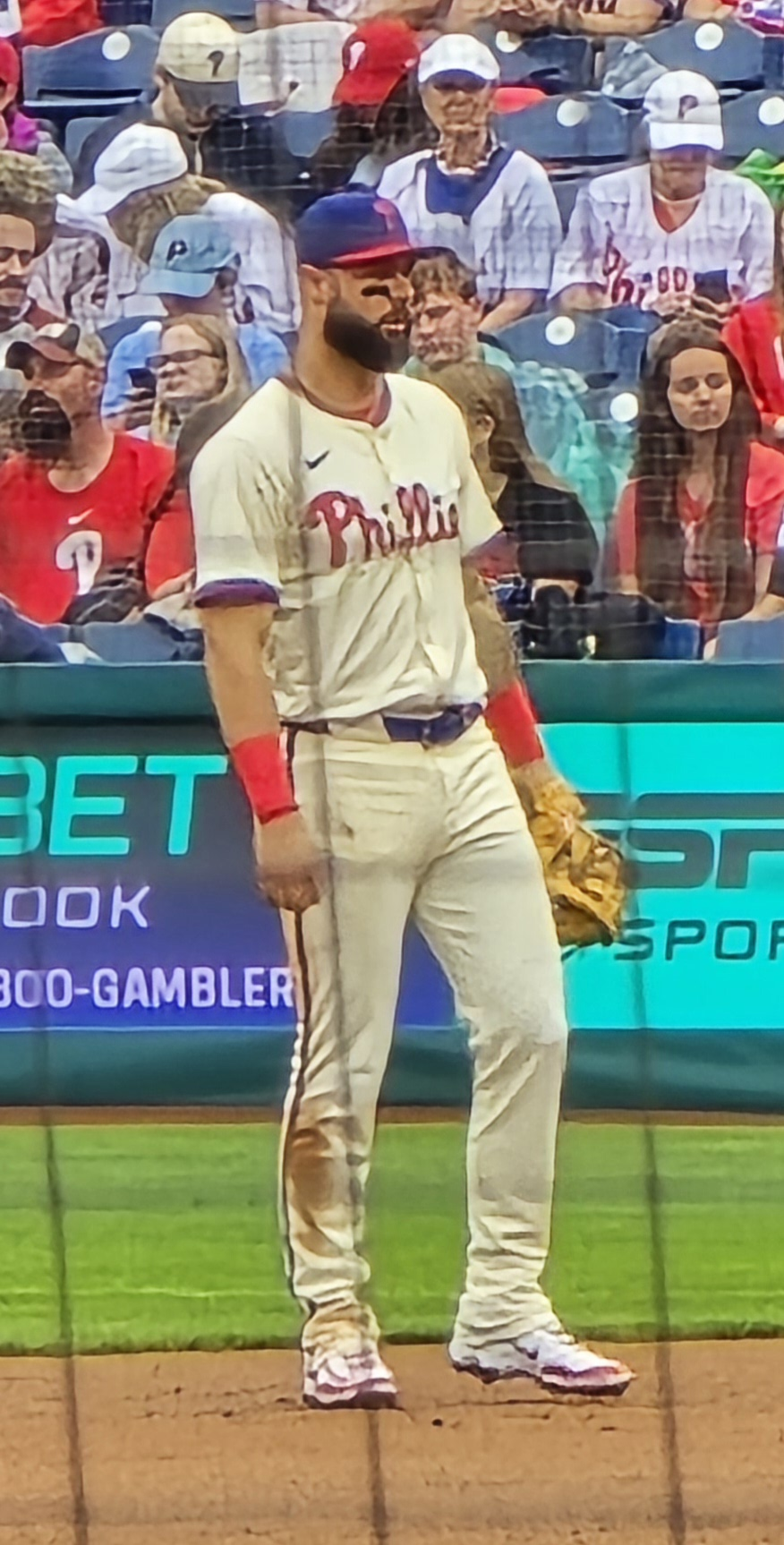
- Wilson with the Phillies in May 2025

Free agent
- Utility player
- Born: September 11, 1994 (age 32); High Point, North Carolina, U.S.
- Bats: Right Throws: Right

MLB debut
- August 9, 2023, for the Philadelphia Phillies

MLB statistics (through 2026 season)
- Batting average: .224
- Home runs: 13
- Runs batted in: 43
- Stats at Baseball Reference

Teams
- Philadelphia Phillies (2023–2025); Baltimore Orioles (2026); Seattle Mariners (2026)

Weston Graham Wilson (born September 11, 1994) is an American professional baseball utility player who is a free agent. He has previously played in Major League Baseball (MLB) for the Philadelphia Phillies, Baltimore Orioles, and Seattle Mariners.

== Career ==
=== Amateur career ===
Wilson attended Wesleyan Christian Academy in High Point, North Carolina, and Clemson University, where he played college baseball for the Clemson Tigers. In 2015, he played collegiate summer baseball with the Wareham Gatemen of the Cape Cod Baseball League.

=== Milwaukee Brewers ===
The Milwaukee Brewers selected Wilson in the 17th round, with the 501st overall selection, of the 2016 MLB draft. He made his professional debut for the rookie–level Helena Brewers, hitting .318 in 62 games. In 2017, Wilson split the year between the Single–A Wisconsin Timber Rattlers and High–A Carolina Mudcats, batting a cumulative .254/.323/.378 with eight home runs and 53 runs batted in (RBIs) across 112 total games.

Wilson spent the 2018 season back in Carolina, apart from a 12-game audition for the Double–A Biloxi Shuckers. In 105 games for the Mudcats, he slashed .274/.330/.447 with 13 home runs and 62 RBI. Wilson spent the 2019 season with Double–A Biloxi, playing in 127 games and hitting .232/.324/.416 with a career–high 19 home runs, 58 RBIs, and 12 stolen bases. He did not play in a game in 2020 due to the cancellation of the minor league season because of the COVID-19 pandemic.

In 2021, when Wilson was playing for the Nashville Sounds, he developed a blood clot in his right shoulder. In 70 games, he had batted .267/.354/.548 with 16 home runs and 35 RBI. After having surgery, he played in the Arizona Fall League that year. Wilson returned to Nashville in 2022, playing in 118 games and batting .228/.297/.358 with 11 home runs, 54 RBIs, and a career–high 17 stolen bases. He elected free agency following the season on November 10, 2022.

=== Philadelphia Phillies ===
On January 11, 2023, Wilson signed a minor league contract with the Philadelphia Phillies organization. In 100 games for the Triple–A Lehigh Valley IronPigs, he hit .260/.361/.524 with 25 home runs, 69 RBI, and 23 stolen bases. On August 6, Wilson was selected to the 40-man roster and promoted to the major leagues for the first time. He made his first career start on August 9, hitting a home run during his first career at bat. In eight games for the Phillies in his rookie campaign, Wilson went 5–for–16 (.313) with one home run, two RBI, and three stolen bases.

Wilson was optioned to Triple–A Lehigh Valley to begin the 2024 season. On July 12, 2024, Wilson was recalled to the major leagues upon the release of Whit Merrifield. On August 15, Wilson hit for the cycle, becoming the tenth Phillie to do so, and the first rookie in Phillies history. The triple was the first of his career, in his 24th game.

Wilson was designated for assignment by Philadelphia on January 20, 2026.

=== Baltimore Orioles ===
On January 22, 2026, Wilson was claimed off waivers by the Baltimore Orioles. He was designated for assignment following the acquisition of Bryan Ramos on February 1. Wilson cleared waivers and was sent outright to the Triple-A Norfolk Tides on February 6. On April 13, Baltimore selected Wilson's contract following an injury to Ryan Mountcastle. He made 19 appearances for the team, batting .231/.348/.333 with one home run, three RBI, and two stolen bases. Wilson was designated for assignment by the Orioles on June 6. He elected free agency after clearing waivers on June 12.

=== Seattle Mariners ===
On June 14, 2026, Wilson signed a minor league contract with the Seattle Mariners. He was initially assigned to the Triple-A Tacoma Rainiers. On June 19, the Mariners selected Wilson's contract, adding him to their active roster. He made 54 appearances for the Mariners, batting .192/.263/.296 with three home runs, 11 RBI, and five stolen bases. On November 2, Wilson was removed from the 40–man roster and elected free agency.

== Personal life ==
Wilson proposed to his wife Madison Wilson before a game while with the Carolina Mudcats in May 2017. They married in September 2017.

In March 2024, Wilson announced via Instagram that the pair were expecting their first child in September 2024.

Achievements
Preceded by Xavier Edwards	Hitting for the cycle August 15, 2024	Succeeded by Carson Kelly
