= Jhonny Pereda =

Venezuelan baseball player (born 1996)

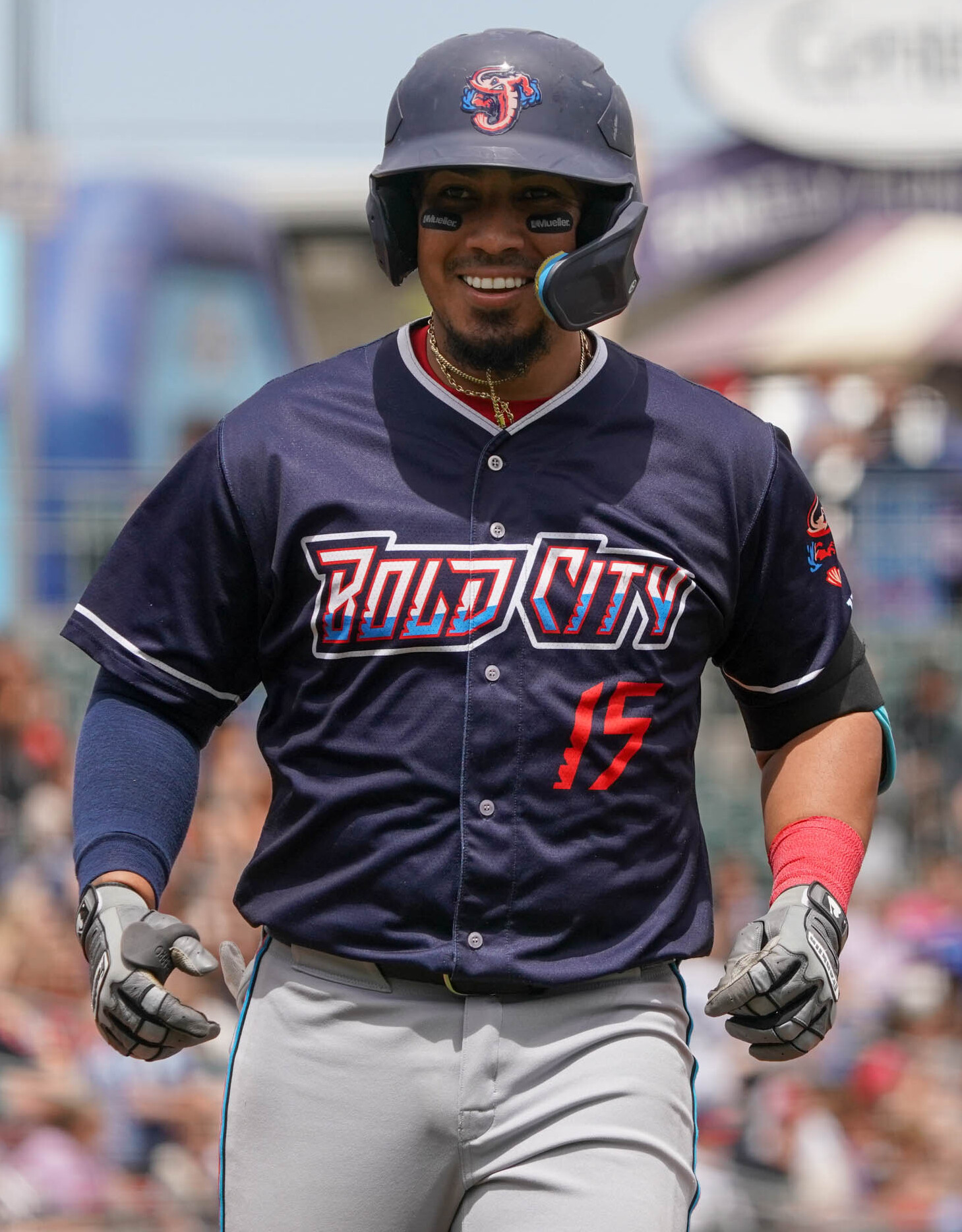
- Pereda with the Jacksonville Jumbo Shrimp in 2024

Seattle Mariners – No. 5
- Catcher
- Born: April 18, 1996 (age 30); San Juan, Venezuela
- Bats: Right Throws: Right

MLB debut
- April 17, 2024, for the Miami Marlins

MLB statistics (through 2026 season)
- Batting average: .268
- Home runs: 2
- Runs batted in: 16
- Stats at Baseball Reference

Teams
- Miami Marlins (2024); Athletics (2025); Minnesota Twins (2025); Seattle Mariners (2026–present)

Jhonny Fernando Pereda (born April 18, 1996) is a Venezuelan professional baseball catcher for the Seattle Mariners of Major League Baseball (MLB). He has previously played in MLB for the Miami Marlins, Athletics, and Minnesota Twins. He made his MLB debut in 2024.

== Career ==
=== Chicago Cubs ===
On April 1, 2013, Pereda signed with the Chicago Cubs as an international free agent. He spent his first two professional seasons with the Venezuelan Summer League Cubs, hitting .221 across 122 games. Pereda spent the 2015 and 2016 seasons with the rookie–level Arizona League Cubs, batting .258 with two home runs and 24 RBI across 52 total games. In 2017, he played in 92 games for the Single–A South Bend Cubs, batting .249/.335/.290 with no home runs and 29 RBI.

Pereda spent the 2018 season with the High–A Myrtle Beach Pelicans, playing in 122 games and hitting .272/.348/.363 with career–highs in home runs (8) and RBI (57). Following the season, he was named the top defensive catcher in the minor leagues. In 2019, Pereda played for the Double–A Tennessee Smokies, appearing in 98 contests and slashing .241/.336/.305 with two home runs and 39 RBI.

=== Boston Red Sox ===
On March 23, 2020, Pereda was traded to the Boston Red Sox as the player to be named later from a previous trade that sent Travis Lakins Sr. to Chicago. He was released by the organization on July 15, but re–signed with the team the following day on a new minor league deal. Pereda did not play in a game in 2020 due to the cancellation of the minor league season because of the COVID-19 pandemic.

He returned to action in 2021 with the Double–A Portland Sea Dogs and Triple–A Worcester Red Sox. In 64 games between the two affiliates, Pereda accumulated a .246/.343/.325 batting line with no home runs and 20 RBI. He elected free agency following the season on November 7, 2021.

=== San Francisco Giants ===
On December 15, 2021, Pereda signed a minor league contract with the San Francisco Giants. He was later invited to major league spring training. Pereda spent the year with the Triple–A Sacramento River Cats, playing in 65 games and hitting .272/.371/.379 with four home runs and 25 RBI. He elected free agency following the season on November 10, 2022.

=== Cincinnati Reds ===
On December 6, 2022, Pereda signed a minor league contract with the Cincinnati Reds that included an invitation to spring training. He spent the entirety of the 2023 season with the Triple–A Louisville Bats, playing in 68 contests and slashing .325/.405/.468 with six home runs and 36 RBI. Pereda elected free agency following the season on November 6, 2023.

=== Miami Marlins ===
On January 17, 2024, Pereda signed a minor league contract with the Miami Marlins. He missed all of spring training after dealing with visa issues that prevented him from entering the United States. Pereda was assigned to the Triple–A Jacksonville Jumbo Shrimp to begin the season, where he went 9–for–26 (.346) across 8 games. On April 15, Pereda was selected to the 40-man roster and promoted to the major leagues for the first time. Pereda recorded his first major league hit on August 8 against all-star pitcher Hunter Greene of the Cincinnati Reds. Elly De La Cruz of the Reds accidentally threw the used ball to a ball boy, who threw it into the stands, before it was ultimately retrieved by the Marlins bench for posterity. Pereda recorded his first major league RBI in the same game, also against Greene. In 20 games during his rookie campaign, he batted .231/.250/.231 with no home runs and four RBI. Pereda was designated for assignment by the Marlins on January 28, 2025.

=== Athletics ===
On January 30, 2025, Pereda was traded to the Athletics in exchange for cash considerations. On May 15, as a position player pitcher in a game against the Los Angeles Dodgers, Pereda struck out Dodgers star Shohei Ohtani. In 17 appearances for the Athletics, he went 7-for-40 (.175) with three RBI and six walks. Pereda was designated for assignment by the team on July 19.

=== Minnesota Twins ===
On July 22, 2025, Pereda was claimed off waivers by the Minnesota Twins. In 11 appearances for Minnesota, he slashed .345/.387/.483 with one RBI and two walks. On January 23, 2026, Pereda was designated for assignment by the Twins.

=== Seattle Mariners ===
On January 27, 2026, Pereda was traded to the Seattle Mariners in exchange for cash considerations. He was optioned to the Triple-A Tacoma Rainiers to begin the 2026 regular season. He was recalled to the Majors on May 14 following an injury to Cal Raleigh, and hit his first MLB career home run on May 20 against Sean Newcomb of the Chicago White Sox.
