= Brock Rodden =

American baseball player (born 2000)

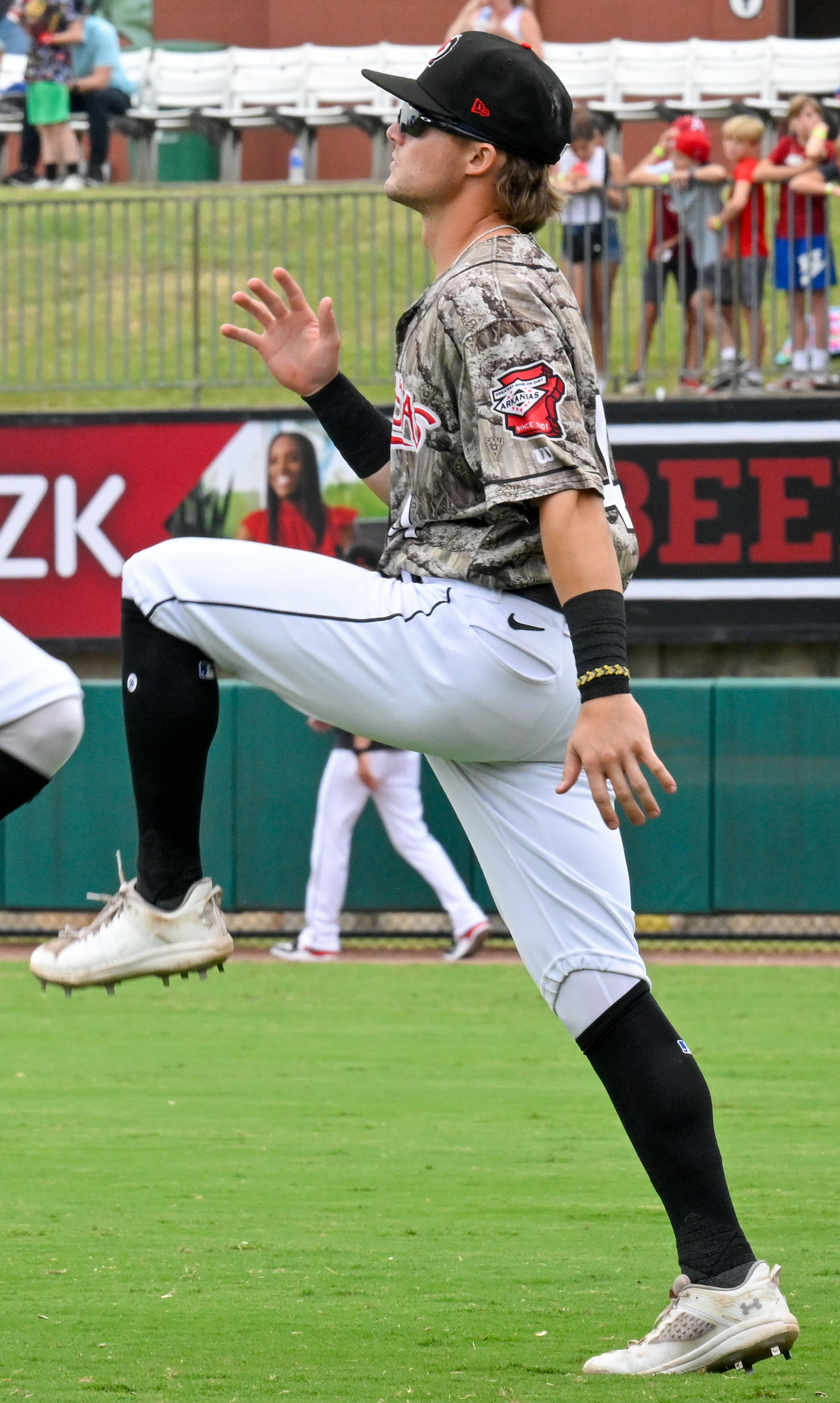
- Rodden with the Arkansas Travelers in 2024

Seattle Mariners – No. 90
- Infielder
- Born: May 25, 2000 (age 26); Durant, Oklahoma U.S.
- Bats: Switch Throws: Right

MLB debut
- August 14, 2026, for the Seattle Mariners

MLB statistics (through 2026 season)
- Batting average: .197
- Home runs: 0
- Runs batted in: 4
- Stats at Baseball Reference

Teams
- Seattle Mariners (2026–present)

Brock Rodden (born May 25, 2000) is an American professional baseball infielder for the Seattle Mariners of Major League Baseball (MLB). He made his MLB debut in 2026.

== Amateur career ==
Rodden attended Oktaha High School in Oktaha, Oklahoma and played college baseball at Seminole State College and Wichita State University. As a sophomore at Wichita State in 2022, he batted .338 with 17 home runs and 48 RBI. Rodden was drafted in the 10th round of the 2022 Major League Baseball draft by the Oakland Athletics but opted not to sign with the team. Returning as a junior at Wichita State in 2023, he played in 55 games and slashed .371/.474/.677 with 17 home runs and 64 RBI and was named the American Athletic Conference Player of the Year. In 2022, he played collegiate summer baseball with the Orleans Firebirds of the Cape Cod Baseball League, and returned to the league in 2023 with the Cotuit Kettleers.

== Professional career ==
Rodden was selected by the Seattle Mariners in the fifth round, 160th overall, of the 2023 Major League Baseball draft, and he signed with the team for $200,000. Rodden made his professional debut that year with the Arizona Complex League Mariners and Modesto Nuts, batting .311 with two home runs in 34 games between the two teams. He split the 2024 season between the High-A Everett AquaSox and Double-A Arkansas Travelers, hitting .257 with 14 home runs, 64 RBI, and 29 stolen bases over 131 games. In 2025, Rodden batted .295 with five home runs, 22 RBI, and 14 stolen bases in 37 games with Arkansas before suffering a hamate fracture in his wrist that ended his season.

To begin the 2026 season, Rodden was assigned to the Triple-A Tacoma Rainiers. In 92 games for Tacoma, he slashed .262/342/.499 with 19 home runs and 65 RBI. On August 14, 2026, Rodden was promoted to the major leagues for the first time. He made his MLB debut later that day, starting at shortstop against the Houston Astros and collecting his first career hit and two RBI.
