= Michael Arroyo (baseball) =

Colombian baseball player (born 2004)

Seattle Mariners – No. 14
- Second baseman / Shortstop
- Born: November 3, 2004 (age 22); Cartagena, Colombia
- Bats: Right Throws: Right

MLB debut
- September 6, 2026, for the Seattle Mariners

MLB statistics (through 2026 season)
- Batting average: .371
- Home runs: 1
- Runs batted in: 4
- Stats at Baseball Reference

Teams
- Seattle Mariners (2026–present)

Michael Arroyo (born November 3, 2004) is a Colombian professional baseball second baseman and shortstop for the Seattle Mariners of Major League Baseball (MLB). He signed with the Mariners in 2022 and made his MLB debut in 2026. He also plays for the Colombia national team.

== Professional career ==
Arroyo signed with the Seattle Mariners as an international free agent in January 2022 for $1.375 million, the most for a Colombian that year. He was one of three Mariners international prospects who received signing bonuses of more than $1 million in 2022, along with Lázaro Montes and Martín Gonzalez.

Arroyo made his professional debut that year with the Dominican Summer League Mariners. Baseball America named him a Rookie-level All-Star. Arroyo started 2023 with the Arizona Complex League Mariners before being promoted to the Single-A Modesto Nuts in mid-June. He started 2024 in Single-A before being promoted to the Everett AquaSox in late June. In 120 games for the two teams, he hit to a .285/.400/.409 slash line with 23 home runs and 89 runs batted in (RBI). He was also hit by 23 pitches, seventh-most in the minors in 2024. He was named the 98th best prospect in baseball by MLB.com before the 2025 season. Arroyo returned to High-A Everett to start the 2025 season. He was promoted to the Double-A Arkansas Travelers in late June. After the season, he was named a Northwest League All-Star and a Baseball America High-A All-Star.

Arroyo began the 2026 season in Double-A before being promoted to the Triple-A Tacoma Rainiers. In 114 games for the two affiliates, he batted a combined .283/.359/.471 with 18 home runs, 81 RBI, and 17 stolen bases. He also began playing in left field in Triple-A after primarily playing as a middle infielder.

On September 6, Arroyo was added to the 40-man roster and promoted to the major leagues for the first time. He made his MLB debut that day. On September 12, he had his first MLB hit and home run, along with three RBI in a 19–1 win over the Athletics. In 15 games as a September call-up, he batted .371 with one home run and four RBI.

== International career ==
Arroyo plays for the Colombia national team. In the 2026 World Baseball Classic (WBC) qualifiers, held in Tucson, Arizona, he hit a two-run double in an 8–1 win over China on March 3, 2025. Arroyo had three hits and two RBI in 10 at-bats as Colombia went undefeated and advanced to the WBC. In the 2026 WBC, Arroyo batted 4-for-13 with one RBI and two stolen bases in four games.

== Personal life ==
Arroyo's older brother Carlos plays for the Colombia national team and played in Minor League Baseball from 2018 to 2025.
