= Colt Emerson =

American baseball player (born 2005)

Seattle Mariners – No. 4
- Shortstop
- Born: July 20, 2005 (age 21); Zanesville, Ohio, U.S.
- Bats: Left Throws: Right

MLB debut
- May 17, 2026, for the Seattle Mariners

MLB statistics (through 2026 season)
- Batting average: .190
- Home runs: 8
- Runs batted in: 23
- Stats at Baseball Reference

Teams
- Seattle Mariners (2026–present)
Medals
Men's baseball
Representing United States
U-12 Baseball World Cup
Gold medal – first place	2017 Taiwan	Team
U-18 Baseball World Cup
Gold medal – first place	2022 Sarasota-Bradenton	Team

Colt Walker Emerson (born July 20, 2005) is an American professional baseball shortstop for the Seattle Mariners of Major League Baseball (MLB). He debuted in MLB in 2026.

== Amateur career ==
Emerson grew up in Cambridge, Ohio, and attended John Glenn High School. As a junior in 2022, he batted .459 with five home runs, 12 doubles, three triples, and 21 runs batted in (RBIs). He played for the United States in the 2022 U-18 Baseball World Cup and batted .360. In his senior season, he hit .446 with eight home runs, 39 runs scored, and 25 RBIs. He was named the Ohio Gatorade Player of the Year and the Division II Player of the Year. Emerson committed to play college baseball at Auburn. He also played football as a wide receiver during his first three years of high school and was a first team All-Ohio selection during his junior year after catching 58 passes for 756 yards and eight touchdowns. Emerson was nicknamed "Ched" in high school.

== Professional career ==
The Seattle Mariners selected Emerson in the first round, with the 22nd overall selection, of the 2023 MLB draft. On July 14, he signed with the Mariners for $3.8 million, exceeding the $3.5 million slot value of the pick. He made his professional debut in August with the Arizona Complex League Mariners. After eight games, Emerson advanced to the Single-A Modesto Nuts. He reached base in all but one of his minor league 28 games in 2023, including postseason games. He hit .374 with 10 doubles, 2 home runs, and 8 stolen bases. He split time at second base and shortstop. In the two-game California League Championship, Emerson went 6-for-10 as the Nuts swept the Rancho Cucamonga Quakes.

Emerson was ranked on many top 100 prospect lists entering 2024. He returned to Modesto to start the season. He hit a first-pitch home run to open his season. He went on the Nuts' injured list twice, missing two weeks in April with an oblique injury then missing more than a month after fouling a ball off his foot in May, causing a stress fracture. He was promoted to the High-A Everett AquaSox in August. He reached base in 49 consecutive games from April 7 until August 17. After batting .293/.440/.427 in Modesto, Emerson struggled in Everett, hitting only .225/.331/.317. After the season, he played for the Peoria Javelinas in the Arizona Fall League. His hitting rebounded, batting .370 in 13 games, but another injury, this one to his hamstring, cut short his Fall League play. He was named to the Fall Stars Game but did not play in the contest.

Emerson started 2025 with Everett and improved from the previous year, batting .281/.388/.453. On August 4, he was promoted to the Double-A Arkansas Travelers and quickly adjusted to the Texas League, batting .282/.360/.430. After the end of Arkansas' season, on September 15, Emerson was promoted again, this time to the Triple-A Tacoma Rainiers. Across three minor league levels, he batted .285/.383/.458 with 16 home runs, six triples, and 14 stolen bases. He primarily played shortstop.

On March 31, 2026, Emerson and the Mariners agreed to an eight-year, $95 million contract extension. The deal includes a full no-trade clause, a ninth-year club option, and escalators that could exceed more than $130 million. It is the largest MLB contract ever for a player prior to their MLB debut, besting the $82 million, eight-year deal that Milwaukee Brewers outfielder Jackson Chourio signed in December 2023.

On May 17, 2026, the Mariners promoted Emerson to the major leagues for the first time, and he made his MLB debut the same day. On May 18, Emerson collected his first hit, a three-run home run against Trevor Richards of the Chicago White Sox. Emerson debuted at third base, but moved to shortstop following an injury to J. P. Crawford, with Crawford then moving to third to accommodate the rookie. A week after his debut, Emerson went 4-for-4 with three doubles against the Kansas City Royals, joining Ken Griffey Jr. and Alex Rodriguez as the only Mariners to record four hits in a game before turning 20. Emerson hit a home run in his first professional game in his home state of Ohio, helping the Mariners defeat the Cleveland Guardians on June 26. However, his batting average dropped to .200 after the series in Cleveland. Dating back to February 2026, Emerson began dealing with a lingering wrist injury; he ultimately played through the discomfort until August 12. The Mariners originally had planned to option him to Triple-A Tacoma; however, after Emerson informed them of the injury, the team instead placed him on the 10-day injured list with left wrist tendon inflammation. On August 24, it was announced that Emerson would undergo season–ending surgery on his left wrist.

== International career ==
Emerson participated in the United States national baseball team youth tournaments and programs. He played in the 2017 U-12 Baseball World Cup in Taiwan, batting .500 in two games. He played in 9 games in the 2022 U-18 Baseball World Cup, batting .360. He was also part of the U.S. under-14 developmental team in 2019 and the under-16/under-17 developmental team in 2021.

== Personal life ==
Emerson's older brother was also an All-Ohio baseball and football player at John Glenn who committed to played college baseball for the Ohio State Buckeyes before transferring to Belmont Abbey College.
