= Lázaro Montes =

Cuban baseball player (born 2004)

Seattle Mariners – No. 99
- Outfielder
- Born: October 22, 2004 (age 21); Havana, Cuba
- Bats: Left Throws: Right

MLB debut
- September 1, 2026, for the Seattle Mariners

MLB statistics (through 2026 season)
- Batting average: .212
- Home runs: 4
- Runs batted in: 11
- Stats at Baseball Reference

Teams
- Seattle Mariners (2026–present)

Lázaro Yosmel Montes (born October 22, 2004) is a Cuban professional baseball outfielder for the Seattle Mariners of Major League Baseball (MLB). He made his MLB debut in 2026.

== Early life ==
Montes' father, Yosmel Montes, is a former track and field athlete for Cuba. They defected from Cuba in 2018, when Montes was 13 years old.

== Career ==
=== Minor leagues (2022–2026) ===
Montes signed with the Seattle Mariners as an international free agent on January 15, 2022 for $2.5 million. He was viewed as a high-risk, high-reward prospect by evaluators. He was one of three Mariners international prospects who received signing bonuses of more than $1 million in 2022, along with Michael Arroyo and Martín Gonzalez. He made his professional debut that year with the Dominican Summer League Mariners.

Montes started 2023 with the Arizona Complex League Mariners before being promoted in early August to the Modesto Nuts. He hit .303 with 13 home runs in 70 games for the two clubs but struck out in 25 percent of his plate appearances. Before the 2024 season, Baseball America ranked Montes as the 100th best prospect in the MLB. Returning to Modesto to begin the season, he batted .309 with 13 home runs over 65 games while reducing his strikeout rate to 19 percent of plate appearances. Following a promotion to the Everett Aquasox in June, his offensive production declined. In 51 games with Everett, he hit .260 with 8 home runs, while his strikeout rate increased to 29 percent.

Montes was named the 42nd best prospect in baseball by MLB.com before the 2025 season. He participated in his first spring training with the Mariners and started the season returning to High-A Everett. In June, he was promoted to the Double-A Arkansas Travelers. He was selected to play in the All-Star Futures Game. He won the Northwest League Most Valuable Player Award.

Montes returned to Double-A to begin 2026, hitting .234/.369/.550 with 25 home runs and 66 runs batted in (RBI) in 79 games. He was named the Texas League Player of the Month for June. He was promoted to the Triple-A Tacoma Rainiers in early July. In 44 games in Triple-A, he slashed .274/.369/.571 with 13 home runs and 30 RBI.

=== Major leagues (2026–present) ===
On September 1, 2026, Montes was promoted to the major leagues for the first time as a September call-up. He made his MLB debut that night against the Boston Red Sox as a designated hitter. He went 2-for-4 with a walk, a solo home run, and two RBI, helping the Mariners to a 9–6 victory. Montes became the first Mariners player to hit a home run in their MLB debut since Kyle Lewis in 2019 and the first to get at least two hits in their debut since Ichiro Suzuki in 2001. On September 8, Montes hit the longest home run at T-Mobile Park since Statcast tracking began in 2015, at 474 feet. It was also tied for the longest home run hit in the 2026 MLB season.

In 59 plate appearances during his initial MLB stint as a September call-up, Montes batted .212 with four home runs and 24 strikeouts.

== Personal life ==
Montes and his wife have a son.
