= Carlos Cardoza =

Puerto Rican baseball player and manager (born 1987)

Seattle Mariners – No. 57
- Coach
- Born: January 19, 1987 (age 39); San Juan, Puerto Rico
- Bats: Right Throws: Right

Teams
- Seattle Mariners (2026–present)

Carlos Cardoza-Oquendo (born January 19, 1987) is a Puerto Rican professional baseball coach who currently is the third base coach for the Seattle Mariners of Major League Baseball (MLB).

== Career ==
Cardoza was born in San Juan, Puerto Rico, but his family moved and he grew up in Decatur, Georgia. He attended Decatur High School. Cardoza attended Georgia State University after high school but did not appear in a college baseball game. He transferred to Armstrong State University for the remainder of college. He played one season of professional baseball in the Puerto Rico.

Cardoza returned to Decatur High School as the head baseball coach in 2014 and 2015. He was hired by the Texas Rangers and served as a coach for one season then a manager across multiple levels from 2016 to 2025, spending his final three seasons helming the Double-A Frisco RoughRiders. He also served as the manager of the Surprise Saguaros in the Arizona Fall League in 2023. He won the Rangers' 2024 Bobby Jones Player Development Award.

Cardoza was hired by the Seattle Mariners as third base coach prior to the 2026 season.

== Personal life ==
Cardoza has two younger brothers. His grandfather also played professional baseball in Puerto Rico.
