= Nick Davila (baseball) =

American baseball player (born 1998)

Seattle Mariners – No. 82
- Pitcher
- Born: November 21, 1998 (age 27); Hialeah, Florida, U.S.
- Bats: Right Throws: Right

MLB debut
- May 3, 2026, for the Seattle Mariners

MLB statistics (through 2026 season)
- Win–loss record: 0–0
- Earned run average: 4.94
- Strikeouts: 13
- Stats at Baseball Reference

Teams
- Seattle Mariners (2026–present)

Nicholas Davila (born November 21, 1998) is an American professional baseball pitcher for the Seattle Mariners of Major League Baseball (MLB). He made his MLB debut in 2026.

== Career ==
=== Amateur career ===
Davila attended Charles W. Flanagan High School in Pembroke Pines, Florida. He then enrolled at Hillsborough Community College and played college baseball there for two years. Davila transferred to the University of South Florida to continue his college career with the South Florida Bulls.

=== Detroit Tigers ===
On July 7, 2020, Davila signed with the Detroit Tigers as an undrafted free agent after going unselected in the 2020 Major League Baseball draft. He did not appear in a game during the season due to the cancellation of the minor league season because of the COVID-19 pandemic.

Davila made his professional debut in 2021 with the Single-A Lakeland Flying Tigers, compiling a 6-8 record and 3.54 ERA with 99 strikeouts across 27 appearances (including 13 starts). He returned to Lakeland in 2022, accumulating a 3-5 record and 3.65 ERA with 53 strikeouts in 56 2/3 innings pitched across 22 games (18 starts). On March 9, 2023, Davila was released by the Tigers organization.

=== Seattle Mariners ===
On March 27, 2023, Davila signed a minor league contract with the Seattle Mariners organization. He would go on to split the season between the Single-A Modesto Nuts, High-A Everett AquaSox, and Triple-A Tacoma Rainiers. In 22 appearances (18 starts) for the three affiliates, Davila logged a cumulative 5-9 record and 4.51 ERA with 109 strikeouts across 117 2/3 innings pitched.

Davila spent the 2024 campaign with High-A Everett, posting a 3-3 record and 4.98 ERA with 28 strikeouts and two saves in 21 2/3 innings pitched across 13 appearances out of the bullpen. In 2025, Davila made 39 relief outings for the Double-A Arkansas Travelers, registering a 1–4 record and 3.55 ERA with 40 strikeouts and four saves across 50 2/3 innings of work.

Davila was assigned to Double-A Arkansas to begin the 2026 campaign, where he recorded a 2.00 ERA with 10 strikeouts over his first eight appearances. On May 2, it was announced that Davila would be selected to the 40-man roster and promoted to the major leagues for the first time. Davila made his MLB debut the following day, pitching in the ninth inning against the Kansas City Royals. He was sent down at the end of May after throwing 7 1/3 scoreless innings. Davila returned to the majors in June, earning his first MLB save after pitching the 10th inning in a win over the Baltimore Orioles on June 9. He made 24 total appearances for Seattle during his rookie campaign, recording a 4.94 ERA with 13 strikeouts and one save across 27 1/3 innings pitched. On August 31, Davila was placed on the injured list due to a SC joint sprain in his right shoulder. He was transferred to the 60–day injured list on September 6, ending his season.
