= Domingo González (baseball) =

Dominican baseball player (born 1999)

Free agent
- Pitcher
- Born: September 27, 1999 (age 27); San Francisco de Macorís, Dominican Republic
- Bats: Right Throws: Right

MLB debut
- May 12, 2026, for the Seattle Mariners

MLB statistics (through 2026 season)
- Win–loss record: 0–0
- Earned run average: 4.70
- Strikeouts: 5
- Stats at Baseball Reference

Teams
- Seattle Mariners (2026)

Domingo Jose González (born September 27, 1999) is a Dominican professional baseball pitcher who is a free agent. He made his Major League Baseball (MLB) debut in 2026.

== Career ==
=== Pittsburgh Pirates ===
On June 13, 2018, Gonzalez signed with the Pittsburgh Pirates as an international free agent. He made his professional debut with the Dominican Summer League Pirates. Gonzalez split the 2019 season between the Low-A West Virginia Black Bears, rookie-level Gulf Coast League Pirates, and the DSL Pirates; in 17 appearances (nine starts) for the three affiliates, he accumulated a 7–3 record and 2.09 ERA with 84 strikeouts over 69 innings of work. He did not play in a game in 2020 due to the cancellation of the minor league season because of the COVID-19 pandemic.

González returned to action in 2021, accumulating a 5–5 record and 4.95 ERA with 104 strikeouts across 20 games (14 starts) for the Single-A Bradenton Marauders and High-A Greensboro Grasshoppers. In 2022, he made 29 appearances (11 starts) split between Greensboro and the Double-A Altoona Curve, registering a combined 9–3 record and 4.90 ERA with 103 strikeouts across 104 2/3 innings pitched.

=== Atlanta Braves ===
On December 7, 2022, Gonzalez was selected by the Atlanta Braves in the minor league phase of the Rule 5 draft. He spent the 2023 season with the Double-A Mississippi Braves, posting a 3–5 record and 4.19 ERA with 76 strikeouts and one save in 53 2/3 innings pitched across 40 games.

Gonzalez split the 2024 campaign between Double–A Mississippi and the Triple–A Gwinnett Stripers. In 45 appearances split between the two affiliates, he compiled a 4–3 record and 2.91 ERA with 83 strikeouts and 9 saves across 52 2/3 innings pitched. On November 2, 2024, the Braves added Gonzalez to their 40-man roster to prevent him from reaching minor league free agency.

Gonzalez was optioned to Triple-A Gwinnett to begin the 2025 season, where he logged a 2–1 record and 4.29 ERA with 39 strikeouts over 42 innings of work. Gonzalez was designated for assignment by the Braves on August 10, 2025.

=== Seattle Mariners ===
On August 12, 2025, Gonzalez was claimed off waivers by the Seattle Mariners. He made 11 appearances down the stretch for the Triple-A Tacoma Rainiers, logging a 1–0 record and 5.02 ERA with nine strikeouts across 14 1/3 innings pitched.

Gonzalez was optioned to Triple-A Tacoma to begin the 2026 season. Across his first 12 appearances for Tacoma, he recorded a 1.80 ERA with 15 strikeouts over 15 innings of work. On May 11, 2026, Gonzalez was promoted to the major leagues for the first time. He made his MLB debut the next day, pitching a scoreless inning in relief and recording his first career strikeout against the Houston Astros. González made five appearances for Seattle, recording a 4.70 ERA with five strikeouts across 7 2/3 innings pitched. On June 11, González was designated for assignment by the Mariners following the promotion of Michael Rucker. He cleared waivers and was sent outright to Triple-A Tacoma on June 15. He elected free agency on November 2.
