= Kade Anderson =

American baseball player (born 2004)

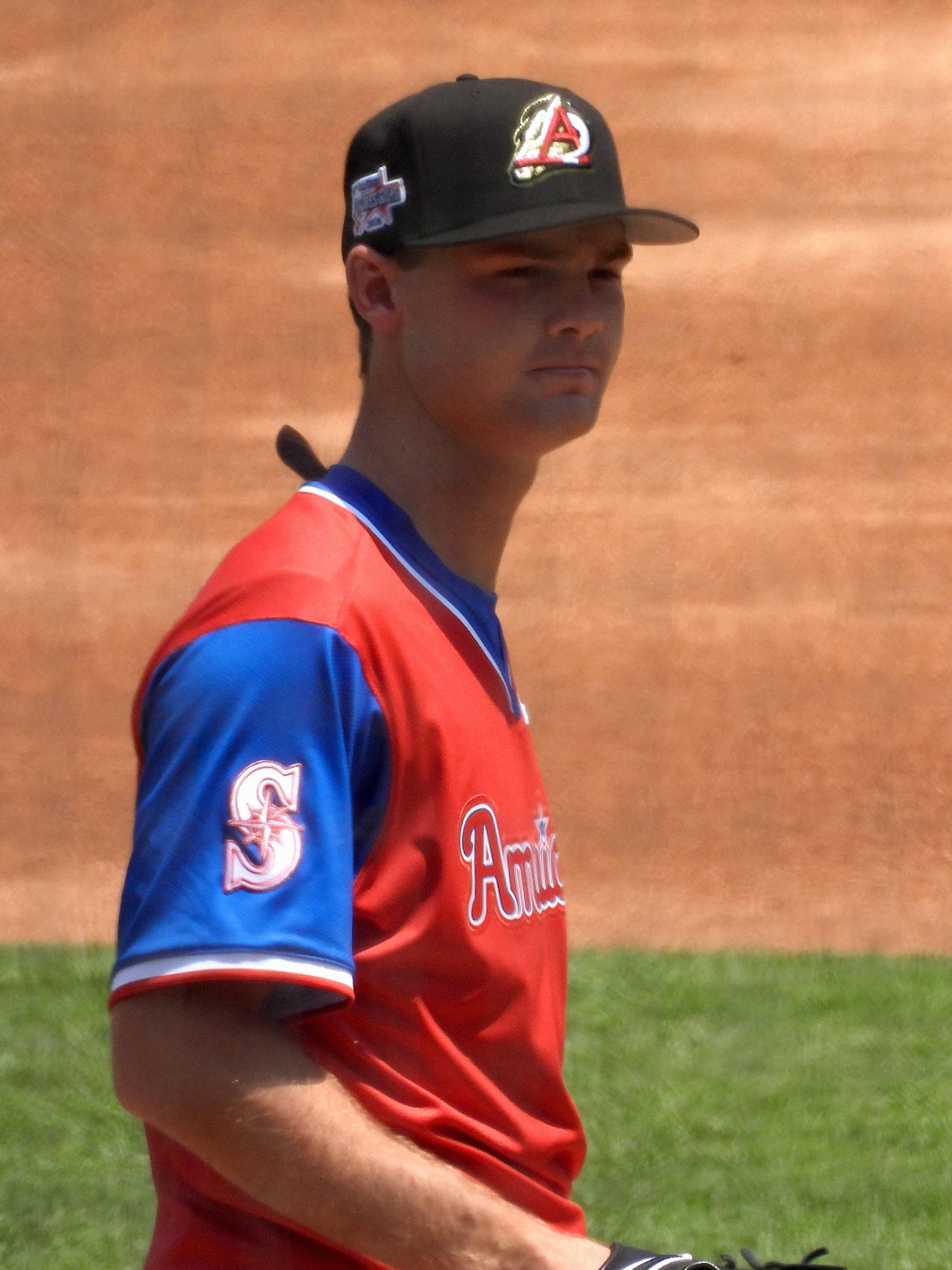
- Anderson in the 2026 All-Star Futures Game

Seattle Mariners – No. 13
- Pitcher
- Born: July 6, 2004 (age 22); Slidell, Louisiana, U.S.
- Bats: Left Throws: Left

MLB debut
- August 22, 2026, for the Seattle Mariners

MLB statistics (through 2026 season)
- Win–loss record: 2–2
- Earned run average: 3.79
- Strikeouts: 32
- Stats at Baseball Reference

Teams
- Seattle Mariners (2026–present)

Kade William Anderson (born July 6, 2004) is an American professional baseball pitcher for the Seattle Mariners of Major League Baseball (MLB). He played college baseball for the LSU Tigers, with whom he won the 2025 College World Series and was named the Most Outstanding Player of the series. The Mariners selected him third overall in the 2025 MLB draft and he made his MLB debut in 2026.

== Amateur career ==
Anderson attended St. Paul's School in Covington, Louisiana. In high school, he had 28–1 record with a 0.22 earned run average (ERA) and 212 strikeouts. He did not pitch his senior year in high school in 2022 after undergoing Tommy John surgery. He was ranked 130th by Perfect Game in the Class of 2023, being the second overall player and left-handed pitcher in Louisiana. He committed to play college baseball for the LSU Tigers.

Anderson did not pitch his first year at LSU in 2023 while recovering from surgery. He returned in 2024, pitching in 18 games with nine starts for the Tigers. He went 4–2 with a 3.99 ERA and 59 strikeouts in 38 1/3 innings.

Anderson entered 2025 as LSU's number one starter. On April 3, against the Oklahoma Sooners, he had 14 strikeouts and had LSU's first shutout since 2018. On June 21, Anderson threw his second complete-game shutout of the season. He had 10 strikeouts, this time against Coastal Carolina, to win Game 1 of the 2025 College World Series. Anderson was named the College World Series Most Outstanding Player after LSU won Game 2 and clinched their eighth national title. Anderson was named the Baseball America College Pitcher of the Year.

== Professional career ==
Anderson was selected as the third overall pick in the 2025 Major League Baseball draft by the Seattle Mariners. He signed with Seattle for a signing bonus worth $8.8 million. He pitched in the Mariners' 2026 Spring Breakout game. He made his minor league debut with the Double-A Arkansas Travelers. He allowed one run over his first five starts in Double-A. He won four Texas League Pitcher of the Week awards, three of them in a row, as well the Texas League Pitcher of the Month for June. He started the All-Star Futures Game, throwing one scoreless inning, allowing a single to Jesús Made. He ended his tenure with the Travelers with a 1.06 ERA with 135 strikeouts in 91 1/3 innings (18 starts).

On August 22, the Mariners promoted Anderson to the major leagues, and he made his debut later that day against the Chicago Cubs. He pitched 5 2/3 innings, allowing 3 earned runs with 5 strikeouts in a game the Mariners ultimately won on a walk-off. On September 20, Anderson pitched 7 scoreless innings with 7 strikeouts against the Colorado Rockies at Coors Field.
