= 2026 Athletics season =

2026 Athletics
- League: American League
- Division: West
- Ballpark: Sutter Health Park; Las Vegas Ballpark
- City: West Sacramento, California; Summerlin South, Nevada
- Record: 64–98 (.395)
- Divisional place: 4th
- Owner: John Fisher
- General manager: David Forst (through August 7); Dan Feinstein (starting August 7)
- Manager: Mark Kotsay
- Television: NBC Sports California
- Radio: KNEW; Athletics Radio Network

The 2026 Athletics season was the 126th season for the Athletics franchise, the 59th season in California, and the franchise's second year in West Sacramento. The team plays 75 home games at Sutter Health Park as part of their temporary relocation following their departure from Oakland, and prior to their planned permanent relocation to the Las Vegas metropolitan area. Las Vegas Ballpark in Summerlin South, Nevada, was used as their home stadium for six games.

== Season standings ==
=== American League West ===
AL West
Team	W	L	Pct.	GB	Home	Road
Houston Astros	81	81	.500	—	39‍–‍42	42‍–‍39
Texas Rangers	80	82	.494	1	45‍–‍36	35‍–‍46
Seattle Mariners	76	86	.469	5	43‍–‍38	33‍–‍48
Athletics	64	98	.395	17	32‍–‍49	32‍–‍49
Los Angeles Angels	62	100	.383	19	34‍–‍47	28‍–‍53

=== American League Wild Card ===
Division leaders
Team	W	L	Pct.
Tampa Bay Rays	98	64	.605
Cleveland Guardians	85	77	.525
Houston Astros	81	81	.500

Wild Card teams (Top 3 teams qualify for postseason)
Team	W	L	Pct.	GB
New York Yankees	93	68	.578	+9½
Boston Red Sox	87	75	.537	+3
Chicago White Sox	84	78	.519	—
Texas Rangers	80	82	.494	4
Baltimore Orioles	79	82	.491	4½
Toronto Blue Jays	79	83	.488	5
Minnesota Twins	77	85	.475	7
Detroit Tigers	76	86	.469	8
Seattle Mariners	76	86	.469	8
Kansas City Royals	69	93	.426	15
Athletics	64	98	.395	20
Los Angeles Angels	62	100	.383	22

=== Record against opponents ===
2026 American League record Source: MLB Standings Grid – 2026
Team	ATH	BAL	BOS	CWS	CLE	DET	HOU	KC	LAA	MIN	NYY	SEA	TB	TEX	TOR	NL
Athletics	—	2–4	3–4	1–5	1–5	0–6	6–7	2–5	8–5	3–3	3–3	7–6	0–6	7–6	2–4	19–29
Baltimore	4–2	—	4–9	4–2	3–4	4–2	5–1	5–1	3–3	3–3	3–9	3–4	8–5	2–4	7–6	21–27
Boston	4–3	9–4	—	6–0	3–3	5–2	1–5	5–1	4–2	1–5	6–7	3–3	6–7	3–3	4–9	27–21
Chicago	5–1	2–4	0–6	—	7–6	9–4	2–5	9–4	4–2	8–5	3–4	3–3	2–4	4–2	5–1	21–27
Cleveland	5–1	4–3	3–3	6–7	—	10–3	2–4	7–6	6–0	6–7	2–4	4–3	1–5	2–4	2–4	25–23
Detroit	6–0	2–4	2–5	4–9	3–10	—	2–5	6–7	3–3	5–8	4–2	4–2	4–2	4–2	3–3	24–24
Houston	7–6	1–5	5–1	5–2	4–2	5–2	—	4–2	7–6	2–4	3–3	3–10	2–4	9–4	3–3	21–27
Kansas City	5–2	1–5	1–5	4–9	6–7	7–6	2–4	—	5–1	8–5	0–6	5–1	2–5	1–5	3–3	19–29
Los Angeles	5–8	3–3	2–4	2–4	0–6	3–3	6–7	1–5	—	3–4	3–4	6–7	3–3	8–5	2–4	15–33
Minnesota	3–3	3–3	5–1	5–8	7–6	8–5	4–2	5–8	4–3	—	3–3	2–4	1–5	5–1	4–3	18–30
New York	3–3	9–3	7–6	4–3	4–2	2–4	3–3	6–0	4–3	3–3	—	4–2	6–7	4–2	7–6	27–21
Seattle	6–7	4–3	3–3	3–3	3–4	2–4	10–3	1–5	7–6	4–2	2–4	—	1–5	5–8	2–4	23–25
Tampa Bay	6–0	5–8	7–6	4–2	5–1	2–4	4–2	5–2	3–3	5–1	7–6	5–1	—	4–3	9–4	27–21
Texas	6–7	4–2	3–3	2–4	4–2	2–4	4–9	5–1	5–8	1–5	2–4	8–5	3–4	—	6–1	25–23
Toronto	4–2	6–7	9–4	1–5	4–2	3–3	3–3	3–3	4–2	3–4	6–7	4–2	4–9	1–6	—	24–24

Updated with the results of all games through September 27, 2026.

== Game log ==
Legend
Athletics Win	Athletics Loss	Game postponed / Tie	Eliminated from playoff race

2026 game log
Total: 64–98 (Home: 32–49; Away: 32–49)
March/April: 17–14 (Home: 7–6; Away: 10–8)

#	Date	Opponent	Score	Win	Loss	Save	Stadium (Attendance)	Record	Streak
1	March 27	@ Blue Jays	2–3	Hoffman (1–0)	Sterner (0–1)	—	Rogers Centre (42,728)	0–1	L1
2	March 28	@ Blue Jays	7–8 (11)	Miles (1–0)	Medina (0–1)	—	Rogers Centre (40,268)	0–2	L2
3	March 29	@ Blue Jays	2–5	Lauer (1–0)	Morales (0–1)	Hoffman (1)	Rogers Centre (36,484)	0–3	L3
4	March 30	@ Braves	0–4	Elder (1–0)	Lopez (0–1)	—	Truist Park (24,478)	0–4	L4
5	March 31	@ Braves	5–2	Civale (1–0)	Suárez (0–1)	Leiter Jr. (1)	Truist Park (30,799)	1–4	W1
6	April 1	@ Braves	1–5	Sale (2–0)	Severino (0–1)	—	Truist Park (27,568)	1–5	L1
7	April 3	Astros	11–4	Springs (1–0)	Javier (0–1)	—	Sutter Health Park (12,410)	2–5	W1
8	April 4	Astros	0–11	Imai (1–0)	Morales (0–2)	—	Sutter Health Park (12,015)	2–6	L1
9	April 5	Astros	12–10 (10)	Alvarado (1–0)	Abreu (0–1)	—	Sutter Health Park (10,085)	3–6	W1
10	April 7	@ Yankees	3–5	Cruz (1–0)	Leiter Jr. (0–1)	Bednar (5)	Yankee Stadium (39,853)	3–7	L1
11	April 8	@ Yankees	3–2	Alvarado (2–0)	Bednar (0–1)	Kuhnel (1)	Yankee Stadium (38,147)	4–7	W1
12	April 9	@ Yankees	1–0	Springs (2–0)	Weathers (0–1)	Harris (1)	Yankee Stadium (40,392)	5–7	W2
13	April 10	@ Mets	4–0	Perkins (1–0)	Holmes (2–1)	—	Citi Field (36,349)	6–7	W3
14	April 11	@ Mets	11–6	Lopez (1–1)	Senga (0–2)	—	Citi Field (38,244)	7–7	W4
15	April 12	@ Mets	1–0	Civale (2–0)	Peralta (1–1)	Kuhnel (2)	Citi Field (37,316)	8–7	W5
16	April 13	Rangers	1–8	Eovaldi (2–2)	Severino (0–2)	—	Sutter Health Park (8,344)	8–8	L1
17	April 14	Rangers	2–1	Springs (3–0)	Gore (2–1)	Leiter Jr. (2)	Sutter Health Park (8,031)	9–8	W1
18	April 15	Rangers	6–5	Harris (1–0)	Beeks (1–1)	Kuhnel (3)	Sutter Health Park (9,252)	10–8	W2
19	April 16	Rangers	6–9	Quantrill (1–0)	Sterner (0–2)	—	Sutter Health Park (8,764)	10–9	L1
20	April 17	White Sox	2–9	Martin (3–1)	Civale (2–1)	—	Sutter Health Park (12,027)	10–10	L2
21	April 18	White Sox	7–6 (11)	Perkins (2–0)	Sims (0–2)	—	Sutter Health Park (11,131)	11–10	W1
22	April 19	White Sox	4–7	Schultz (1–1)	Springs (3–1)	Domínguez (4)	Sutter Health Park (12,070)	11–11	L1
23	April 20	@ Mariners	6–4	Harris (2–0)	Legumina (0–1)	Kuhnel (4)	T-Mobile Park (20,203)	12–11	W1
24	April 21	@ Mariners	5–2	Lopez (2–1)	Bazardo (0–1)	Perkins (1)	T-Mobile Park (19,092)	13–11	W2
25	April 22	@ Mariners	4–5	Muñoz (3–2)	Kuhnel (0–1)	—	T-Mobile Park (15,704)	13–12	L1
26	April 24	@ Rangers	8–1	Severino (1–2)	Eovaldi (2–4)	—	Globe Life Field (30,396)	14–12	W1
27	April 25	@ Rangers	3–4	Winn (2–1)	Springs (3–2)	Latz (1)	Globe Life Field (35,810)	14–13	L1
28	April 26	@ Rangers	2–1	Sterner (1–2)	Rocker (1–2)	Perkins (2)	Globe Life Field (32,031)	15–13	W1
29	April 28	Royals	1–4 (10)	Mears (2–1)	Sterner (1–3)	Erceg (7)	Sutter Health Park (9,274)	15–14	L1
30	April 29	Royals	5–2	Severino (2–2)	Wacha (2–2)	Leiter Jr. (3)	Sutter Health Park (9,399)	16–14	W1
31	April 30	Royals	6–3	Medina (1–1)	Cameron (2–2)	Perkins (3)	Sutter Health Park (9,333)	17–14	W2

May: 11–17 (Home: 4–11; Away: 7–6)

#	Date	Opponent	Score	Win	Loss	Save	Stadium (Attendance)	Record	Streak
32	May 1	Guardians	5–8	Sabrowski (1–1)	Ginn (0–1)	Smith (8)	Sutter Health Park (12,122)	17–15	L1
33	May 2	Guardians	6–14	Cecconi (1–4)	Lopez (2–2)	—	Sutter Health Park (11,390)	17–16	L2
34	May 3	Guardians	7–1	Civale (3–1)	Messick (3–1)	—	Sutter Health Park (12,194)	18–16	W1
35	May 5	@ Phillies	1–9	Sánchez (3–2)	Severino (2–3)	—	Citizens Bank Park (36,069)	18–17	L1
36	May 6	@ Phillies	3–6	Kerkering (1–0)	Perkins (2–1)	Keller (3)	Citizens Bank Park (36,474)	18–18	L2
37	May 7	@ Phillies	12–1	Ginn (1–1)	Painter (1–4)	—	Citizens Bank Park (37,543)	19–18	W1
38	May 8	@ Orioles	4–3	Lopez (3–2)	Bradish (1–5)	Harris (2)	Camden Yards (39,311)	20–18	W2
39	May 9	@ Orioles	6–2	Civale (4–1)	Baz (1–4)	—	Camden Yards (30,707)	21–18	W3
40	May 10	@ Orioles	1–2	Bassitt (3–2)	Severino (2–4)	Garcia (3)	Camden Yards (24,213)	21–19	L1
41	May 12	Cardinals	4–6	Pallante (4–3)	Springs (3–3)	O'Brien (12)	Sutter Health Park (11,132)	21–20	L2
42	May 13	Cardinals	6–2	Ginn (2–1)	Liberatore (2–2)	—	Sutter Health Park (10,182)	22–20	W1
43	May 14	Cardinals	4–5	Svanson (1–1)	Perkins (2–2)	O'Brien (13)	Sutter Health Park (8,975)	22–21	L1
44	May 15	Giants	5–2	Civale (5–1)	Mahle (1–5)	Harris (3)	Sutter Health Park (12,348)	23–21	W1
45	May 16	Giants	4–6	McDonald (2–0)	Severino (2–5)	Gage (1)	Sutter Health Park (12,489)	23–22	L1
46	May 17	Giants	1–10	Houser (2–4)	Springs (3–4)	—	Sutter Health Park (12,541)	23–23	L2
47	May 18	@ Angels	1–2	Silseth (1–0)	Ginn (2–2)	—	Angel Stadium (25,776)	23–24	L3
48	May 19	@ Angels	14–6	Sterner (2–3)	Detmers (1–5)	—	Angel Stadium (23,803)	24–24	W1
49	May 20	@ Angels	6–5 (10)	Barlow (1–0)	Silseth (1–1)	Harris (4)	Angel Stadium (24,588)	25–24	W2
50	May 21	@ Angels	3–2 (10)	Kuhnel (1–1)	Zeferjahn (2–2)	Leiter Jr. (4)	Angel Stadium (25,848)	26–24	W3
51	May 22	@ Padres	3–7	Morejón (4–1)	Springs (3–5)	—	Petco Park (41,180)	26–25	L1
52	May 23	@ Padres	0–2	Giolito (2–0)	Ginn (2–3)	Miller (16)	Petco Park (42,616)	26–26	L2
53	May 24	@ Padres	5–2	Lopez (4–2)	King (4–3)	Barlow (1)	Petco Park (41,799)	27–26	W1
54	May 25	Mariners	2–9	Miller (1–0)	Civale (5–2)	—	Sutter Health Park (11,194)	27–27	L1
55	May 26	Mariners	1–4	Hancock (4–2)	Jump (0–1)	—	Sutter Health Park (9,539)	27–28	L2
56	May 27	Mariners	1–9	Gilbert (3–4)	Springs (3–6)	—	Sutter Health Park (9,612)	27–29	L3
57	May 29	Yankees	2–8	Rodón (1–2)	Severino (2–6)	—	Sutter Health Park (12,254)	27–30	L4
58	May 30	Yankees	6–4	Ginn (3–3)	Weathers (2–3)	Barlow (2)	Sutter Health Park (12,361)	28–30	W1
59	May 31	Yankees	8–13	Warren (7–1)	Lopez (4–3)	—	Sutter Health Park (12,515)	28–31	L1

June: 12–15 (Home: 7–8; Away: 5–7)

#	Date	Opponent	Score	Win	Loss	Save	Stadium (Attendance)	Record	Streak
60	June 2	@ Cubs	2–1	Jump (1–1)	Taillon (2–5)	Harris (5)	Wrigley Field (36,065)	29–31	W1
61	June 3	@ Cubs	5–4 (10)	Harris (3–0)	Roberts (0–1)	Sterner (1)	Wrigley Field (31,922)	30–31	W2
62	June 4	@ Cubs	6–7	Rolison (4–1)	Kuhnel (1–2)	—	Wrigley Field (37,419)	30–32	L1
63	June 5	@ Astros	1–5	Lambert (5–4)	Perkins (2–3)	—	Daikin Park (32,420)	30–33	L2
64	June 6	@ Astros	2–13	Imai (3–3)	Morris (0–1)	—	Daikin Park (30,211)	30–34	L3
65	June 7	@ Astros	5–0	Jump (2–1)	Burrows (3–8)	—	Daikin Park (28,878)	31–34	W1
66	June 8	Brewers	14–15 (12)	Uribe (4–2)	Suárez (0–2)	Patrick (3)	Las Vegas Ballpark (8,519)	31–35	L1
67	June 9	Brewers	7–5	Ginn (4–3)	Gasser (0–3)	Barnett (1)	Las Vegas Ballpark (8,422)	32–35	W1
68	June 10	Brewers	4–3	Barlow (2–0)	Patrick (3–3)	Alvarado (1)	Las Vegas Ballpark (8,436)	33–35	W2
69	June 12	Rockies	6–4	Barnett (1–0)	Agnos (0–2)	Harris (6)	Las Vegas Ballpark (8,534)	34–35	W3
70	June 13	Rockies	7–5	Suárez (1–2)	Freeland (1–7)	Alvarado (2)	Las Vegas Ballpark (8,532)	35–35	W4
71	June 14	Rockies	9–23	Sugano (7–4)	Springs (3–7)	Castellano (1)	Las Vegas Ballpark (8,268)	35–36	L1
72	June 15	Pirates	11–2	Ginn (5–3)	Jones (1–1)	—	Sutter Health Park (10,033)	36–36	W1
73	June 16	Pirates	5–6	Montgomery (2–1)	Alvarado (2–1)	Soto (11)	Sutter Health Park (8,615)	36–37	L1
74	June 17	Pirates	4–12	Ashcraft (6–3)	Civale (5–3)	—	Sutter Health Park (9,024)	36–38	L2
75	June 18	Angels	5–0	Jump (3–1)	Johnson (0–2)	—	Sutter Health Park (9,245)	37–38	W1
76	June 19	Angels	12–11 (10)	Alvarado (3–1)	Yates (0–3)	—	Sutter Health Park (9,687)	38–38	W2
77	June 20	Angels	0–7	Ureña (5–5)	Ginn (5–4)	—	Sutter Health Park (11,261)	38–39	L1
78	June 21	Angels	7–9	Silseth (2–1)	Alvarado (3–2)	Bachman (1)	Sutter Health Park (12,377)	38–40	L2
79	June 23	@ Giants	1–3	Ray (6–6)	Civale (5–4)	Kilian (5)	Oracle Park (40,043)	38–41	L3
80	June 24	@ Giants	1–2	Miller (1–0)	Alvarado (3–3)	—	Oracle Park (37,526)	38–42	L4
81	June 25	@ Giants	9–6	Hartlieb (1–0)	Kilian (2–4)	Barnett (2)	Oracle Park (33,089)	39–42	W1
82	June 26	@ Angels	9–3	Ginn (6–4)	Ureña (5–6)	—	Angel Stadium (29,089)	40–42	W2
83	June 27	@ Angels	2–5	Zeferjahn (4–3)	Hartlieb (1–1)	Yates (2)	Angel Stadium (37,064)	40–43	L1
84	June 28	@ Angels	1–4	Aldegheri (3–3)	Civale (5–5)	Natera Jr. (1)	Angel Stadium (32,557)	40–44	L2
85	June 29	Dodgers	4–9	Lauer (4–5)	Jump (3–2)	—	Sutter Health Park (12,394)	40–45	L3
86	June 30	Dodgers	3–9	Wrobleski (10–2)	Springs (3–8)	—	Sutter Health Park (12,387)	40–46	L4

July: 5–19 (Home: 3–9; Away: 2–10)

#	Date	Opponent	Score	Win	Loss	Save	Stadium (Attendance)	Record	Streak
87	July 1	Dodgers	7–1	Ginn (7–4)	Barnes (0–1)	—	Sutter Health Park (12,592)	41–46	W1
88	July 3	Marlins	5–12	Bachar (1–0)	Perkins (2–4)	—	Sutter Health Park (10,312)	41–47	L1
89	July 4	Marlins	2–7	Alcántara (10–4)	Civale (5–6)	—	Sutter Health Park (12,532)	41–48	L2
90	July 5	Marlins	8–9	Pérez (5–6)	Jump (3–3)	—	Sutter Health Park (8,686)	41–49	L3
91	July 7	@ Tigers	2–6	Skubal (5–4)	Ginn (7–5)	—	Comerica Park (28,736)	41–50	L4
92	July 8	@ Tigers	1–6	Melton (5–1)	Springs (3–9)	—	Comerica Park (29,049)	41–51	L5
93	July 9	@ Tigers	1–4	Valdez (5–6)	Perkins (2–5)	Jansen (11)	Comerica Park (20,699)	41–52	L6
94	July 10	@ White Sox	1–14	Burke (6–4)	Civale (5–7)	—	Rate Field (37,539)	41–53	L7
95	July 11	@ White Sox	0–1	Fedde (5–6)	Jump (3–4)	Taylor (4)	Rate Field (22,742)	41–54	L8
96	July 12	@ White Sox	1–9	Schultz (3–6)	Ginn (7–6)	—	Rate Field (27,175)	41–55	L9
–	July 14	96th All-Star Game in Philadelphia, PA							
97	July 17	Nationals	4–23	Cavalli (6–4)	Jump (3–5)	—	Sutter Health Park (11,087)	41–56	L10
98	July 18	Nationals	15–1	Ginn (8–6)	Littell (7–7)	—	Sutter Health Park (11,138)	42–56	W1
99	July 19	Nationals	2–5	Griffin (11–2)	Lopez (4–4)	Beeter (8)	Sutter Health Park (9,088)	42–57	L1
100	July 20	@ Diamondbacks	5–2	Medina (2–1)	Ginkel (3–3)	Harris (7)	Chase Field (19,121)	43–57	W1
101	July 21	@ Diamondbacks	5–6 (10)	Ginkel (4–3)	Medina (2–2)	—	Chase Field (19,709)	43–58	L1
102	July 22	@ Diamondbacks	5–15	Kelly (8–8)	Jump (3–6)	—	Chase Field (19,343)	43–59	L2
103	July 24	@ Twins	2–0	Lopez (5–4)	Matthews (4–8)	Harris (8)	Target Field (26,128)	44–59	W1
104	July 25	@ Twins	0–2	Rogers (6–3)	Barnett (1–1)	Gómez (13)	Target Field (30,873)	44–60	L1
105	July 26	@ Twins	8–11	Prielipp (3–5)	Springs (3–10)	—	Target Field (19,701)	44–61	L2
106	July 27	Red Sox	2–4	Tolle (6–6)	Perkins (2–6)	Chapman (25)	Sutter Health Park (10,486)	44–62	L3
107	July 28	Red Sox	4–3	Jump (4–6)	Bennett (6–4)	Harris (9)	Sutter Health Park (10,356)	45–62	W1
108	July 29	Red Sox	2–4 (10)	Chapman (2–3)	Suárez (1–3)	Weissert (1)	Sutter Health Park (9,674)	45–63	L1
109	July 30	Red Sox	4–5	Gray (13–2)	Medina (2–3)	Chapman (26)	Sutter Health Park (10,246)	45–64	L2
110	July 31	Tigers	1–13	Madden (1–0)	Springs (3–11)	—	Sutter Health Park (8,926)	45–65	L3

August: 8–20 (Home: 4–10; Away: 4–10)

#	Date	Opponent	Score	Win	Loss	Save	Stadium (Attendance)	Record	Streak
111	August 1	Tigers	6–8	Valdez (6–7)	Perkins (2–7)	Jansen (13)	Sutter Health Park (10,426)	45–66	L4
112	August 2	Tigers	0–11	Montero (8–6)	Jump (4–7)	—	Sutter Health Park (8,237)	45–67	L5
113	August 4	@ Reds	4–5	Garcia (2–2)	Harris (3–1)	Pagán (12)	Great American Ball Park (21,714)	45–68	L6
114	August 5	@ Reds	2–3	Lowder (4–7)	Juenger (0–1)	Pagán (13)	Great American Ball Park (16,544)	45–69	L7
115	August 6	@ Reds	5–6	Abbott (6–7)	Barnett (1–2)	Burke (2)	Great American Ball Park (17,617)	45–70	L8
116	August 7	@ Red Sox	1–13	Tolle (7–6)	Perkins (2–8)	Burgos (1)	Fenway Park (37,227)	45–71	L9
117	August 8	@ Red Sox	7–3	Jump (5–7)	Bennett (7–5)	Harris (10)	Fenway Park (36,696)	46–71	W1
118	August 9	@ Red Sox	4–3	Alvarado (4–3)	Chapman (2–4)	Harris (11)	Fenway Park (36,817)	47–71	W2
119	August 10	Rays	6–10	Roycroft (1–0)	Suárez (1–4)	—	Sutter Health Park (7,427)	47–72	L1
120	August 11	Rays	4–12	Martinez (12–3)	Barnett (1–3)	—	Sutter Health Park (8,154)	47–73	L2
121	August 12	Rays	4–8	Rasmussen (12–5)	Perkins (2–9)	—	Sutter Health Park (8,287)	47–74	L3
122	August 14	Rangers	8–3	Medina (3–3)	Silseth (3–3)	—	Sutter Health Park (8,082)	48–74	W1
123	August 15	Rangers	3–5	Gore (7–9)	Ginn (8–7)	Latz (24)	Sutter Health Park (10,070)	48–75	L1
124	August 16	Rangers	5–2	Medina (4–3)	Junis (1–2)	Harris (12)	Sutter Health Park (7,343)	49–75	W1
125	August 17	@ Royals	5–9	Wacha (6–8)	Barnett (1–4)	Cruz (5)	Kauffman Stadium (12,438)	49–76	L1
126	August 18	@ Royals	3–4	Durán (1–0)	Harris (3–2)	—	Kauffman Stadium (12,009)	49–77	L2
127	August 19	@ Royals	7–9	Kimbrel (1–2)	Rom (1–1)	—	Kauffman Stadium (11,579)	49–78	L3
128	August 20	@ Royals	2–6	Thomas (1–1)	Jump (5–8)	—	Kauffman Stadium (11,867)	49–79	L4
129	August 21	@ Astros	0–4	Wesneski (3–1)	Ginn (8–8)	—	Daikin Park (28,477)	49–80	L5
130	August 22	@ Astros	4–3	Medina (5–3)	Sousa (1–2)	Alvarado (3)	Daikin Park (31,009)	50–80	W1
131	August 23	@ Astros	7–6	Perkins (3–9)	Okert (6–2)	Harris (13)	Daikin Park (30,708)	51–80	W2
132	August 24	Twins	6–9	Matthews (8–8)	Springs (3–12)	Morris (4)	Sutter Health Park (8,149)	51–81	L1
133	August 25	Twins	4–2	Jump (6–8)	Bradley (9–6)	Alvarado (4)	Sutter Health Park (8,301)	52–81	W1
134	August 26	Twins	7–4	Ginn (9–8)	Morris (4–6)	Alvarado (5)	Sutter Health Park (9,446)	53–81	W2
135	August 28	Orioles	3–4 (10)	Kittredge (3–3)	Basso (0–1)	Hoppe (1)	Sutter Health Park (7,228)	53–82	L1
136	August 29	Orioles	3–5	Baz (5–14)	Perkins (3–10)	Kittredge (8)	Sutter Health Park (10,619)	53–83	L2
137	August 30	Orioles	5–8	Bassitt (6–4)	Springs (3–13)	Canó (3)	Sutter Health Park (7,606)	53–84	L3
138	August 31	@ Rangers	1–8	deGrom (10–9)	Jump (6–9)	—	Globe Life Field (22,572)	53–85	L4

September: 11–13 (Home: 7–5; Away: 4–8)

#	Date	Opponent	Score	Win	Loss	Save	Stadium (Attendance)	Record	Streak
139	September 1	@ Rangers	5–8	Gore (8–10)	Basso (0–2)	Latz (28)	Globe Life Field (24,253)	53–86	L5
140	September 2	@ Rangers	9–2	Lopez (6–4)	Bradford (0–4)	—	Globe Life Field (23,801)	54–86	W1
141	September 3	@ Mariners	7–4	Blewett (1–0)	Anderson (0–1)	Harris (14)	T-Mobile Park (27,368)	55–86	W2
142	September 4	@ Mariners	7–6	Basso (1–2)	Gilbert (11–9)	Harris (15)	T-Mobile Park (34,134)	56–86	W3
143	September 5	@ Mariners	6–2	Springs (4–13)	Kirby (9–11)	—	T-Mobile Park (40,950)	57–86	W4
144	September 6	@ Mariners	0–2	Woo (11–9)	Jump (6–10)	Muñoz (25)	T-Mobile Park (36,867)	57–87	L1
145	September 7	Blue Jays	6–5	Harris (4–2)	Varland (5–5)	—	Sutter Health Park (7,467)	58–87	W1
146	September 8	Blue Jays	2–4	Soriano (12–7)	Perkins (3–11)	Miles (2)	Sutter Health Park (7,632)	58–88	L1
147	September 9	Blue Jays	2–0	Blewett (2–0)	Lorenzen (3–12)	Alvarado (6)	Sutter Health Park (7,217)	59–88	W1
148	September 11	Mariners	6–5 (10)	Roycroft (2–0)	Bazardo (3–4)	—	Sutter Health Park (8,682)	60–88	W2
149	September 12	Mariners	1–19	Woo (12–9)	Jump (6–11)	—	Sutter Health Park (10,289)	60–89	L1
150	September 13	Mariners	8–7	Alvarado (5–3)	Muñoz (5–6)	—	Sutter Health Park (9,171)	61–89	W1
151	September 15	@ Rays	1–2	Baker (3–2)	Alvarado (5–4)	—	Tropicana Field (16,102)	61–90	L1
152	September 16	@ Rays	3–4	Martinez (15–4)	Basso (1–3)	Sulser (3)	Tropicana Field (14,552)	61–91	L2
153	September 17	@ Rays	1–10	Rasmussen (15–5)	Springs (4–14)	—	Tropicana Field (12,305)	61–92	L3
154	September 18	@ Guardians	3–5	Cantillo (10–9)	Blewett (2–1)	Smith (38)	Progressive Field (35,391)	61–93	L4
155	September 19	@ Guardians	6–12	Cecconi (5–7)	Lopez (6–5)	—	Progressive Field (31,615)	61–94	L5
156	September 20	@ Guardians	0–1	Williams (14–8)	Perkins (3–12)	Smith (39)	Progressive Field (26,110)	61–95	L6
157	September 22	Angels	9–7	Medina (6–3)	Bachman (1–3)	Harris (16)	Sutter Health Park (7,711)	62–95	W1
158	September 23	Angels	7–3	Hartlieb (2–1)	Ureña (9–11)	—	Sutter Health Park (7,430)	63–95	W2
159	September 24	Astros	5–7	Ullola (2–0)	Blewett (2–2)	Abreu (9)	Sutter Health Park (9,367)	63–96	L1
160	September 25	Astros	6–5	Lopez (7–5)	Brown (6–4)	Harris (17)	Sutter Health Park (9,012)	64–96	W1
161	September 26	Astros	2–13	Wesneski (6–2)	Perkins (3–13)	—	Sutter Health Park (12,025)	64–97	L1
162	September 27	Astros	0–9	Pecko (2–0)	Basso (1–4)	—	Sutter Health Park (10,022)	64–98	L2

== Roster ==
2026 Athletics
Roster
Pitchers: 37 Elvis Alvarado; 58 Scott Barlow; 63 Mason Barnett; 66 Brady Basso; 49 Scott Blewett; 62 Ben Bowden; 45 Aaron Civale; 68 Joey Estes; 44 Tyler Ferguson; 35 J. T. Ginn; 36 Hogan Harris; 31 Geoff Hartlieb; 52 Seth Johnson; 58 Hayden Juenger; 61 Gage Jump; 49 Michael Kelly; 48 Brooks Kriske; 65 Matt Krook; 47 Joel Kuhnel; 38 Mark Leiter Jr.; 57 Jacob Lopez; 46 Luis Medina; 19 Luis Morales; 67 Kade Morris; 50 Jack Perkins; 65 Taylor Rashi; 30 Joe Rock; 39 Drew Rom; 56 Chris Roycroft; 40 Luis Severino; 59 Jeffrey Springs; 60 Justin Sterner; 54 José Suárez; 70 Yunior Tur	Catchers: 15 Jonah Heim; 23 Shea Langeliers; 10 Brian Serven; 29 Austin Wynns; Infielders: 20 Zack Gelof; 11 Brett Harris; 2 Darell Hernáiz; 77 Andy Ibáñez; 44 Joshua Kuroda-Grauer; 16 Nick Kurtz; 22 Jeff McNeil; 13 Joey Meneses; 3 Max Muncy; 11 Jonathan Ornelas; 17 Michael Stefanic; 29 Donovan Walton; 47 Tommy White; 12 Alika Williams; 5 Jacob Wilson	Outfielders: 33 Henry Bolte; 4 Lawrence Butler; 1 Denzel Clarke; 26 Carlos Cortes; 25 Brent Rooker; 21 Tyler Soderstrom; 32 Colby Thomas	Manager: 7 Mark Kotsay; Coaches: 18 Mike Aldrete (hitting); 51 Darren Bush (bench); 28 Ryan Christenson (first base); 41 Chris Cron (assistant hitting); 8 Bobby Crosby (third base); 88 Javy Guerra (bullpen); 55 Ramón Hernández (coach and interpreter); 71 Dan Hubbs (interim pitching); 91 Dustin Hughes (bullpen catcher); 72 Marcus Jensen (quality control); 90 Christian Molfetta (bullpen catcher)

== Player stats ==
= Indicates team leader

=== Batting ===
Note: G = Games played; AB = At bats; R = Runs scored; H = Hits; 2B = Doubles; 3B = Triples; HR = Home runs; RBI = Runs batted in; SB = Stolen bases; BB = Walks; AVG = Batting average; SLG = Slugging average

Player	G	AB	R	H	2B	3B	HR	RBI	SB	BB	AVG	SLG
Jeff McNeil	144	478	52	126	23	0	9	59	8	31	.264	.368
Lawrence Butler	154	472	64	112	19	2	17	62	10	61	.237	.394
Shea Langeliers	106	424	58	111	21	0	23	58	3	37	.262	.474
Henry Bolte	119	415	57	115	16	2	11	38	21	39	.277	.405
Tyler Soderstrom	109	396	58	97	27	3	19	56	2	53	.245	.472
Zack Gelof	111	394	76	101	16	2	22	55	16	31	.256	.475
Nick Kurtz	99	352	62	90	15	1	21	69	7	79	.256	.483
Carlos Cortes	124	343	30	86	16	2	10	43	2	31	.251	.397
Jacob Wilson	80	320	37	85	16	1	7	37	4	12	.266	.388
Jonah Heim	93	319	30	64	15	0	12	35	0	22	.201	.361
Max Muncy	82	256	31	59	9	2	9	30	3	21	.230	.387
Alika Williams	88	215	29	58	20	1	4	16	2	10	.270	.428
Tommy White	56	189	19	48	5	0	3	10	0	5	.254	.328
Brent Rooker	48	180	20	36	4	0	10	29	2	19	.200	.389
Donovan Walton	60	139	22	31	6	1	6	20	3	23	.223	.410
Darell Hernáiz	56	137	13	32	3	0	1	9	3	16	.234	.277
Colby Thomas	55	114	11	23	3	0	4	11	1	4	.202	.333
Brian Serven	29	80	8	14	1	0	5	14	0	4	.175	.375
Denzel Clarke	40	76	6	12	1	0	0	6	4	8	.158	.171
Joshua Kuroda-Grauer	21	71	8	26	7	0	1	4	0	2	.366	.507
Austin Wynns	14	39	3	3	0	0	0	0	0	3	.077	.077
Michael Stefanic	19	26	3	9	1	0	0	4	0	3	.346	.385
Joey Meneses	9	20	1	3	0	0	0	2	0	3	.150	.150
Andy Ibáñez	11	17	1	2	0	0	0	3	0	1	.118	.118
Jonathan Ornelas	6	12	0	2	0	0	0	0	0	1	.167	.167
Brett Harris	5	4	0	0	0	0	0	0	0	1	.000	.000
Team totals	162	5488	699	1345	244	17	194	670	91	520	.245	.402

Source:Baseball Reference

=== Pitching ===
Note: W = Wins; L = Losses; ERA = Earned run average; G = Games pitched; GS = Games started; SV = Saves; IP = Innings pitched; H = Hits allowed; R = Runs allowed; ER = Earned runs allowed; BB = Walks allowed; SO = Strikeouts

Player	W	L	ERA	G	GS	SV	IP	H	R	ER	BB	SO
Jeffrey Springs	4	14	6.18	29	29	0	142.2	152	105	98	57	112
J. T. Ginn	9	8	3.71	27	24	0	138.1	114	63	57	57	121
Jacob Lopez	7	5	5.47	27	24	0	123.1	126	78	75	58	112
Jack Perkins	3	13	6.10	37	17	3	121.0	125	89	82	51	140
Gage Jump	6	11	5.47	20	20	0	98.2	104	62	60	46	108
Aaron Civale	5	7	5.42	16	15	0	74.2	98	46	45	23	58
Luis Medina	6	3	3.08	60	1	0	73.0	63	30	25	39	93
Hogan Harris	4	2	3.33	74	0	17	70.1	60	28	26	42	88
Luis Severino	2	6	4.16	12	12	0	62.2	61	33	29	31	65
Elvis Alvarado	5	4	3.90	56	0	6	55.1	44	25	24	25	65
Mason Barnett	1	4	7.02	20	6	2	50.0	53	40	39	30	50
Brady Basso	1	4	6.07	26	7	0	43.0	61	30	29	10	31
José Suárez	1	3	5.65	36	1	0	43.0	48	30	27	13	37
Justin Sterner	2	3	6.12	46	0	1	42.2	46	31	29	13	40
Scott Blewett	2	2	3.31	25	0	0	35.1	39	16	13	9	32
Mark Leiter Jr.	0	1	4.28	36	0	4	33.2	33	16	16	11	38
Scott Barlow	2	0	6.48	36	0	2	33.1	26	26	24	19	29
Geoff Hartlieb	2	1	4.82	18	0	0	28.0	30	15	15	14	22
Joel Kuhnel	1	2	4.21	25	0	4	25.2	27	12	12	6	14
Kade Morris	0	1	10.90	6	2	0	17.1	30	21	21	7	10
Seth Johnson	0	0	6.23	12	1	0	17.1	22	12	12	6	20
Luis Morales	0	2	13.50	5	2	0	16.0	27	26	24	14	13
Hayden Juenger	0	1	8.36	13	0	0	14.0	22	13	13	6	6
Chris Roycroft	1	0	3.29	9	0	0	13.2	15	6	5	9	11
Yunior Tur	0	0	16.34	8	0	0	12.2	25	27	23	11	14
Drew Rom	0	1	6.75	13	0	0	12.0	16	9	9	3	6
Carlos Cortes	0	0	10.61	9	0	0	9.1	15	12	11	8	1
Joey Estes	0	0	11.05	2	1	0	7.1	12	9	9	2	5
Michael Kelly	0	0	16.20	5	0	0	5.0	12	9	9	6	6
Matt Krook	0	0	14.73	5	0	0	3.2	5	7	6	4	5
Brooks Kriske	0	0	0.00	2	0	0	2.2	2	0	0	1	2
Taylor Rashi	0	0	4.50	1	0	0	2.0	3	1	1	2	1
Tyler Ferguson	0	0	27.00	1	0	0	1.1	4	4	4	0	1
Ben Bowden	0	0	36.00	1	0	0	1.0	2	4	4	2	0
Joe Rock	0	0	-.--	1	0	0	0.0	1	2	2	2	0
Team totals	64	98	5.51	162	162	39	1430.0	1523	937	875	637	1356

Note: No ERA qualifier/leader noted as no pitcher pitched 162 innings (1 inning pitched per game played).

Source:Baseball Reference

== Farm system ==
Level	Team	League	Division	Manager	Record
AAA	Las Vegas Aviators	Pacific Coast League	West	Fran Riordan	32–23
AA	Midland RockHounds	Texas League	South	Gregorio Petit	27–24
High-A	Lansing Lugnuts	Midwest League	East	Javier Goddard	23–28
Low-A	Stockton Ports	California League	North	Darryl Kennedy	21–30
Rookie	ACL Athletics	Arizona Complex League	East	Gunner Buhner	7–14
Rookie	DSL Athletics	Dominican Summer League	West	Wilkin Castillo	0–1
