= Taj Bradley =

Mexican and American baseball player (born 2001)

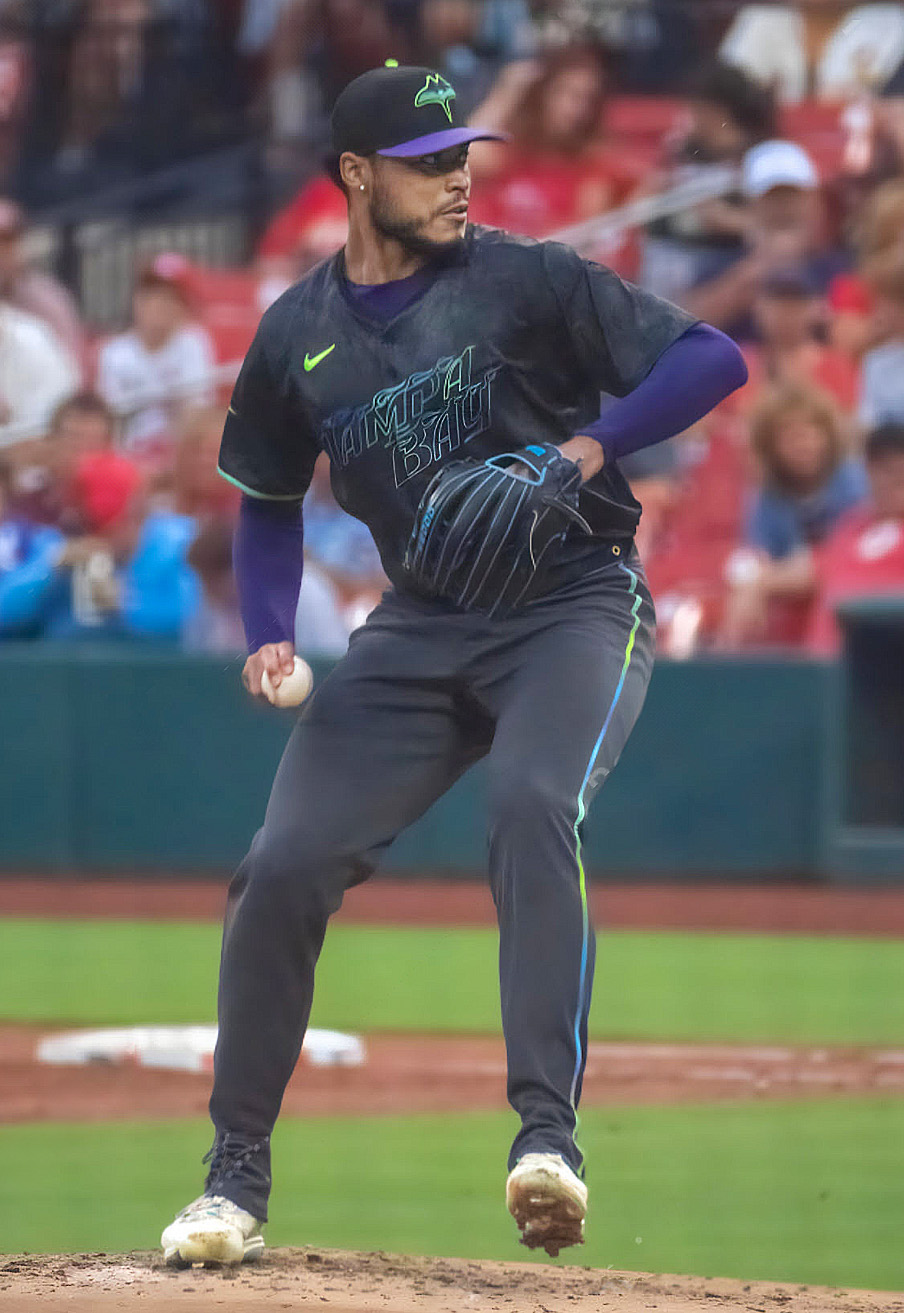
- Bradley with the Tampa Bay Rays

Minnesota Twins – No. 26
- Pitcher
- Born: March 20, 2001 (age 25); Los Angeles, California, U.S.
- Bats: Right Throws: Right

MLB debut
- April 12, 2023, for the Tampa Bay Rays

MLB statistics (through 2026 season)
- Win–loss record: 31–33
- Earned run average: 4.50
- Strikeouts: 615
- Stats at Baseball Reference

Teams
- Tampa Bay Rays (2023–2025); Minnesota Twins (2025–present)

Career highlights and awards
- Pitched an immaculate inning on August 25, 2026

Taj Ali Bradley (born March 20, 2001) is an American professional baseball pitcher for the Minnesota Twins of Major League Baseball (MLB). He has previously played in MLB for the Tampa Bay Rays.

== Career ==
Bradley grew up in Stone Mountain, Georgia, and attended Redan High School. He initially played mostly outfield and catcher. Bradley initially committed to play college baseball at Hillsborough Community College before changing his commitment to the University of South Carolina later in his senior year.

=== Tampa Bay Rays ===
The Tampa Bay Rays selected Bradley in the fifth round, 150th overall, of the 2018 MLB draft. He made his professional debut with the minor league Gulf Coast League Rays with whom he pitched 23 innings and compiled a 5.09 ERA. Bradley spent the 2019 season with the minor league Princeton Rays of the Appalachian League where he went 2–5 with 3.18 over 11 starts and 12 total appearances. Bradley did not play in a game in 2020 due to the cancellation of the minor league season from the COVID-19 pandemic.

Bradley began the 2021 season with the Low-A East Charleston RiverDogs where he went 9–3 with a 1.76 ERA over 14 starts before being promoted to the High-A East Bowling Green Hot Rods. Over eight starts with Bowling Green, he went 3–0 with a 1.96 ERA and 42 strikeouts over 36 1/3 innings. Bradley was assigned to the Double-A Montgomery Biscuits at the start of the 2022 season. He was selected to play in the 2022 All-Star Futures Game. Bradley was promoted to the Triple-A Durham Bulls following the conclusion of the MLB All-Star break. On November 15, 2022, the Rays added Bradley to their 40-man roster to protect him from the Rule 5 draft.

Bradley was optioned back to Triple-A Durham to begin the 2023 season. The Rays promoted him to the major leagues on April 11 to make his major league debut the following day. Bradley started the game on April 12, pitching five innings and striking out eight, while allowing three runs. At the time, his 8 strikeouts ranked second in franchise history for strikeouts in a rookie debut behind Wade Davis (9). His debut was also significant because, according to Elias Sports Bureau, it was only the second time since 1900 that a team on a winning streak of at least 10 games sent a starting pitcher to the mound for his big league debut. He made 23 appearances (21 starts) for Tampa Bay during his rookie campaign, posting a 5-8 record and 5.59 ERA with 129 strikeouts across 104 2/3 innings pitched.

Bradley made 25 starts for the Rays during the 2024 season, compiling an 8–11 record and 4.11 ERA with 154 strikeouts over 138 innings of work. He started 21 games for the team in 2025, posting a 6–6 record and 4.61 ERA with 95 strikeouts across 111 1/3 innings pitched.

=== Minnesota Twins ===
On July 31, 2025, the Rays traded Bradley to the Minnesota Twins in exchange for Griffin Jax. On August 25, Bradley became the first pitcher in the history of the Twins franchise to pitch an immaculate inning, doing so against the Athletics's Carlos Cortes, Brian Serven, and Henry Bolte in the bottom of the 5th inning.

== International career ==
Bradley is of African-American and Mexican descent. He was selected to play for the Mexico national baseball team at the 2026 World Baseball Classic. However, a week before the tournament was set to begin, Bradley withdrew from the team in order to remain with the Twins during spring training.
