= List of Major League Baseball pitchers who have thrown an immaculate inning =

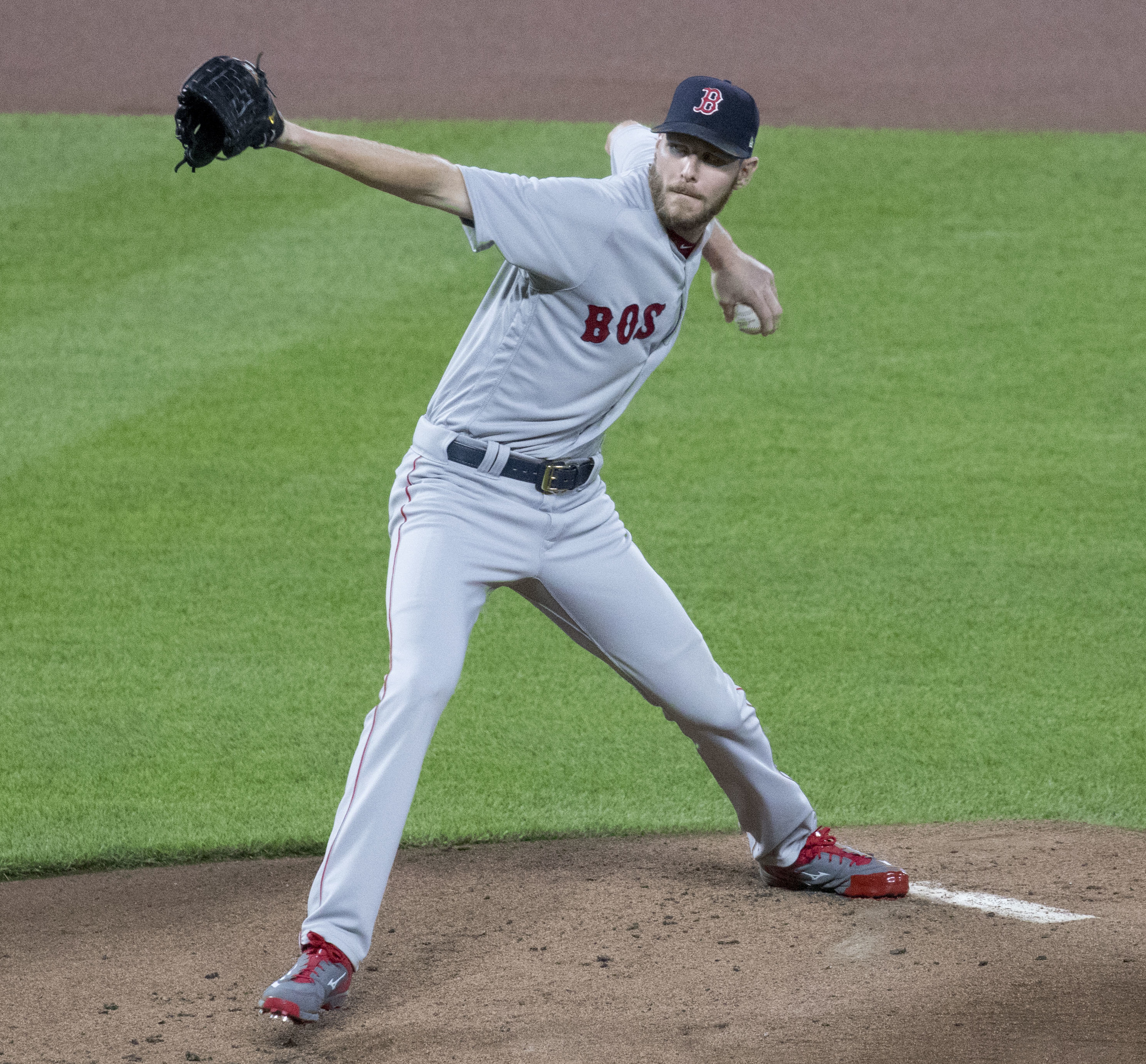
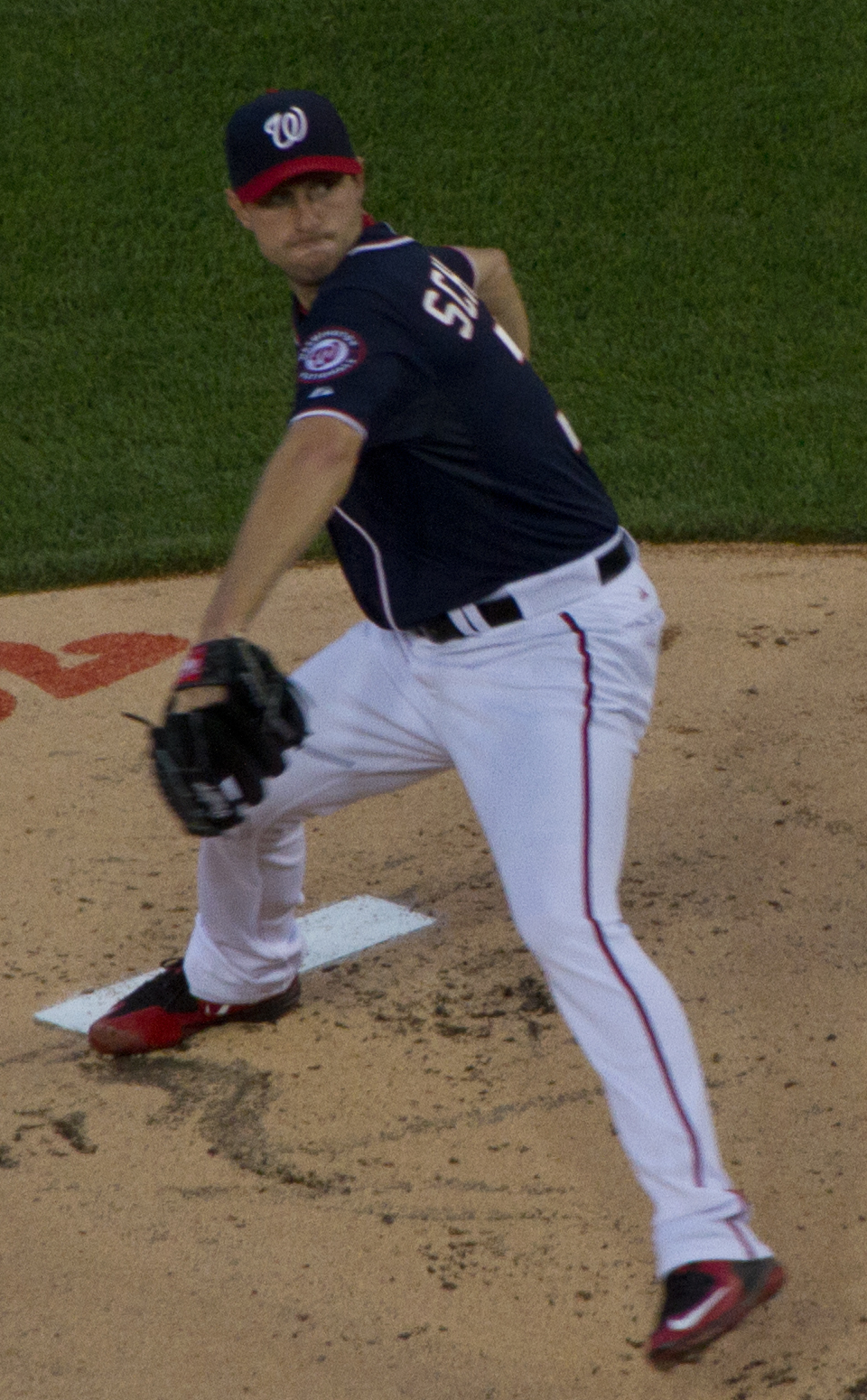
Sandy Koufax, Chris Sale, and Max Scherzer are the only pitchers to achieve an immaculate inning three times.

An immaculate inning occurs in baseball when a pitcher strikes out all three batters he faces in one inning with only nine pitches, the minimum possible. This has happened 125 times in Major League Baseball history; 116 pitchers have accomplished the feat.

The feat was first performed by John Clarkson of the Boston Beaneaters against the Philadelphia Quakers on June 4, 1889; and most recently by Payton Tolle of the Boston Red Sox on September 13, 2026. The term "immaculate inning" first appeared in newspapers after 2000.

Five pitchers have accomplished the feat more than once: Hall of Famers Sandy Koufax and Nolan Ryan, and active pitchers Chris Sale, Max Scherzer, and Kevin Gausman. Only Koufax, Sale, and Scherzer have completed it three times apiece. Only Ryan and Gausman have done it in both the American League and National League. Sale threw two immaculate innings in the same season, doing so in 2019 on May 8 and then on June 5, just 28 days later. In addition to being the only pitcher to throw an immaculate inning in three consecutive seasons, on June 30, 1962, Koufax accomplished his first immaculate inning while throwing his first no-hitter, the only player to do both in a single game.

Sloppy Thurston, Ryan, Wade Miley, Thomas Pannone, Reid Detmers, Hayden Wesneski, Brandon Young, and Tolle are the only rookies to have achieved the feat. Danny Jackson is the sole pitcher to have thrown an immaculate inning in the postseason, doing so in the seventh inning of Game 5 of the 1985 World Series. Jackson pitched a complete game, winning 6–1 and staving off elimination for the Kansas City Royals, who eventually won the series in seven games.

While an immaculate inning typically occurs with the bases empty, a nine-pitch, three-strikeout performance can also be accomplished by a relief pitcher who enters the game with one or more runners on base. On May 8, 2014, Brad Boxberger of the Tampa Bay Rays entered a game against the Baltimore Orioles with the bases loaded and proceeded to strike out the side with nine pitches. No player has ever struck out four batters on 12 pitches in an inning, with one of those batters reaching base on an uncaught third strike.

No pitcher has thrown more than one immaculate inning in a game. Jesús Sánchez of the Florida Marlins came within one pitch of that feat on September 13, 1998. Facing the Atlanta Braves, Sánchez struck out the side in the bottom of the second inning on 10 pitches and threw an immaculate inning in the bottom of the third inning: six consecutive strikeouts on 19 pitches. Just one game has seen two pitchers throw immaculate innings: on June 15, 2022, Phil Maton and Luis Garcia of the Houston Astros struck out the same three Texas Rangers batters (Nathaniel Lowe, Ezequiel Durán, and Brad Miller) in the second and seventh innings respectively. Just six weeks later, Durán was also the first strikeout victim of the very next immaculate inning pitched by Reid Detmers on July 31, 2022, making him the only hitter to be on the opposing end of an immaculate inning three times.

As of the current 2026 season, the Texas Rangers are the only team to never have thrown at least one immaculate inning in their history, and the Arizona Diamondbacks and Toronto Blue Jays are the only team never to have been on the receiving end of an immaculate inning. (Note: The Washington Nationals in their current form have yet to have been victimized by an immaculate inning, but their predecessor team the Montreal Expos were in a 1977 game.)

== Frequency by decade ==
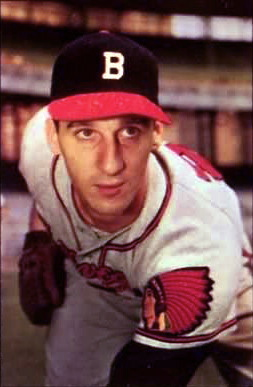
Warren Spahn's immaculate inning in 1949 was the first in 12 seasons.

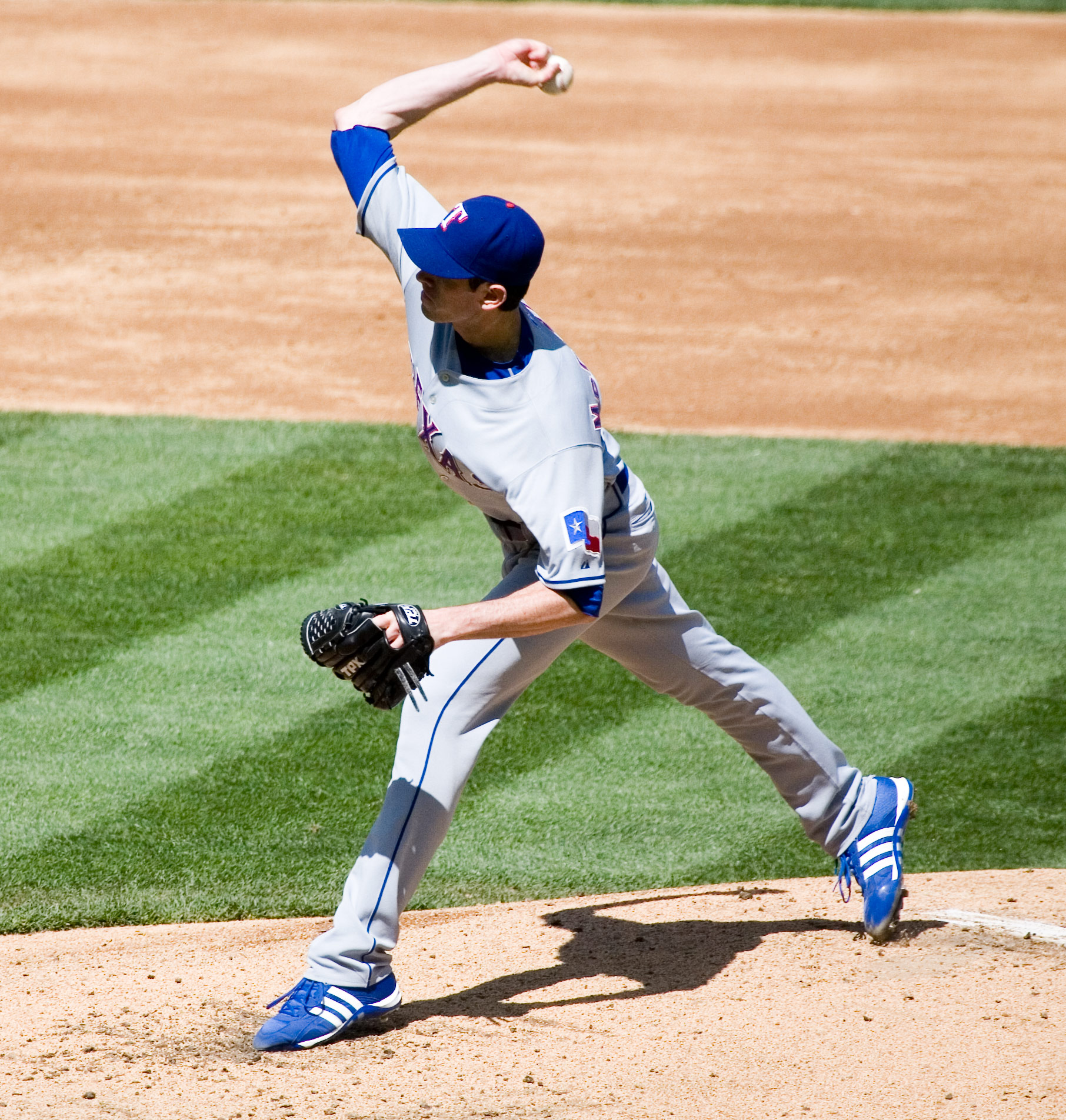
Brandon McCarthy threw the seventh and final immaculate inning of 2014.

The frequency of immaculate innings has varied widely throughout baseball history. There were only 33 immaculate innings in the 114 Major League seasons from 1876 to 1989, an average of only 0.29 per season (or about one every three seasons), but the next 29 occurred in the 20 seasons from 1990 to 2009, an average of 1.45 per season. The pace has since picked up even more, with 63 immaculate innings in the 17 seasons from 2010 to 2026, an average of 3.71 per season.

From 1876 to 2009, 133 seasons, there were 62 immaculate innings, 0.46 per season. Then from 2010 to 2026, 17 seasons, there have been 63 immaculate innings, 3.71 per season.

An alternate perspective shows that the first 41 immaculate innings took place between 1876 and 1996, 121 seasons, for an average of 0.34 per season (or about one every three seasons). The next 38 immaculate innings were thrown between 1997 and 2016, 20 seasons, for an average of 1.90 per season. The most recent 46 immaculate innings occurred between 2017 and 2026, 10 seasons, for an average of 4.60 per season. In just over 12 decades there were 41 immaculate innings, next 2 decades 38 more, and in 1 decade 46 more. The 2025 season is the 150th season since the National League began keeping statistics.

Decade	Immaculate innings	
Decade	Number	Cumulative
1880s	1	1
1890s	0	1
1900s	1	2
1910s	2	4
1920s	4	8
1930s	1	9
1940s	1	10
1950s	3	13
1960s	8	21
1970s	8	29
1980s	4	33
1990s	15	48
2000s	14	62
2010s	37	99
2020s	26	125

== Players ==
Key
Pitcher (X)	Name of the pitcher (number of immaculate innings they had pitched at that point, if more than one)
Date	Date of the game
Team	The pitcher's team at the time of the game
Opposing team	The team against whom the pitcher struck out three batters on nine pitches
Inning	The inning in which the pitcher struck out three batters on nine pitches
Batters faced (X)	The batters who were struck out (number of immaculate innings they had struck out in at that point, if more than one)
Box	Box score with play by play, if available
†	Pitcher has been elected to the Baseball Hall of Fame
‡	Pitcher is active (Note: A player is considered inactive if he has announced his retirement or has not played professionally for a full season.)

MLB pitchers who have thrown an immaculate inning
Pitcher	Date	Team	Opposing team	Inning	Batters faced	Box
John Clarkson^{†}	June 4, 1889	Boston Beaneaters	Philadelphia Quakers	6th	Sam Thompson, Joe Mulvey, Sid Farrar	n/a
Rube Waddell^{†}	July 1, 1902	Philadelphia Athletics	Baltimore Orioles	3rd	Billy Gilbert, Harry Howell, John Cronin	n/a
Walter Johnson^{†}	June 10, 1913	Washington Senators	Detroit Tigers	3rd	George Moriarty, Red McKee, Al Clauss	
Pat Ragan	October 5, 1914	Brooklyn Dodgers	Boston Braves	8th	Possum Whitted, Butch Schmidt, Red Smith	
Joe Oeschger	September 8, 1921	Boston Braves	Philadelphia Phillies	4th	Bevo LeBourveau, Cy Williams, Ed Konetchy	
Sloppy Thurston	August 22, 1923	Chicago White Sox	Philadelphia Athletics	12th	Beauty McGowan, Chick Galloway, Sammy Hale	
Dazzy Vance^{†}	September 14, 1924	Brooklyn Robins	Cincinnati Reds	3rd	Sam Bohne, Bubbles Hargrave, Eppa Rixey	
Lefty Grove^{†}	September 27, 1928	Philadelphia Athletics	Chicago White Sox	7th	Moe Berg, Tommy Thomas, Johnny Mostil	
Lynn Nelson	May 17, 1937	Philadelphia Athletics	New York Yankees	6th	Tony Lazzeri, Lefty Gomez, Frankie Crosetti	
Warren Spahn^{†}	July 2, 1949	Boston Braves	Philadelphia Phillies	2nd	Stan Hollmig, Willie Jones, Eddie Miller	
Billy Hoeft	September 7, 1953	Detroit Tigers	Chicago White Sox	7th	Jim Rivera, Mike Fornieles, Chico Carrasquel	
Robin Roberts^{†}	April 17, 1956	Philadelphia Phillies	Brooklyn Dodgers	6th	Carl Furillo, Charlie Neal, Sandy Amorós	
Jim Bunning^{†}	August 2, 1959	Detroit Tigers	Boston Red Sox	9th	Sammy White, Jim Mahoney, Ike Delock	
Sandy Koufax^{†}	June 30, 1962	Los Angeles Dodgers	New York Mets	1st	Richie Ashburn, Rod Kanehl, Félix Mantilla	
Sandy Koufax^{†} (2)	April 19, 1963	Los Angeles Dodgers	Houston Colt .45s	5th	Bob Aspromonte, Jim Campbell, Turk Farrell	
Tony Cloninger	June 15, 1963	Milwaukee Braves	Philadelphia Phillies	8th	Tony González, Clay Dalrymple, Rubén Amaro	
Sandy Koufax^{†} (3)	April 18, 1964	Los Angeles Dodgers	Cincinnati Reds	3rd	Leo Cárdenas, Johnny Edwards, Jim Maloney	
Bob Bruce	April 19, 1964	Houston Colt .45s	St. Louis Cardinals	8th	Bill White, Charlie James, Ken Boyer	
Al Downing	August 11, 1967	New York Yankees	Cleveland Indians	2nd	Tony Horton, Don Demeter, Duke Sims	
Nolan Ryan^{†}	April 19, 1968	New York Mets	Los Angeles Dodgers	3rd	Claude Osteen, Wes Parker, Zoilo Versalles	
Bob Gibson^{†}	May 12, 1969	St. Louis Cardinals	Los Angeles Dodgers	7th	Len Gabrielson, Paul Popovich, John Miller	
Bill Wilson	July 6, 1971	Philadelphia Phillies	Atlanta Braves	8th	Darrell Evans, Hal King, Earl Williams	
John Strohmayer	July 10, 1971	Montreal Expos	Philadelphia Phillies	5th	Mike Ryan, Woodie Fryman, Denny Doyle	
Milt Pappas	September 24, 1971	Chicago Cubs	Philadelphia Phillies	4th	Greg Luzinski, Don Money, Mike Anderson	
Nolan Ryan^{†} (2)	July 9, 1972	California Angels	Boston Red Sox	2nd	Carlton Fisk, Bob Burda, Juan Beníquez	
Bruce Sutter^{†}	September 8, 1977	Chicago Cubs	Montreal Expos	9th	Ellis Valentine, Gary Carter, Larry Parrish	
Pedro Borbón	June 23, 1979	Cincinnati Reds	San Francisco Giants	9th	Mike Sadek, Gary Lavelle, Billy North	
Lynn McGlothen	August 25, 1979	Chicago Cubs	San Francisco Giants	3rd	Larry Herndon, Joe Strain, Jack Clark	
Joey McLaughlin	September 11, 1979	Atlanta Braves	San Francisco Giants	7th	Larry Herndon (2), Greg Johnston, Johnnie LeMaster	
Ron Guidry	August 7, 1984	New York Yankees	Chicago White Sox	9th	Carlton Fisk (2), Tom Paciorek, Greg Luzinski (2)	
Danny Jackson	October 24, 1985	Kansas City Royals	St. Louis Cardinals	7th	Terry Pendleton, Tom Nieto, Brian Harper	
Jeff Robinson	September 7, 1987	Pittsburgh Pirates	Chicago Cubs	8th	Leon Durham, Andre Dawson, Rafael Palmeiro	
Rob Dibble	June 4, 1989	Cincinnati Reds	San Diego Padres	8th	Carmelo Martínez, Mark Parent, Garry Templeton	
Jeff Montgomery	April 29, 1990	Kansas City Royals	Texas Rangers	8th	Pete Incaviglia, Geno Petralli, Thad Bosley	
Andy Ashby	June 15, 1991	Philadelphia Phillies	Cincinnati Reds	4th	Hal Morris, Todd Benzinger, Jeff Reed	
David Cone	August 30, 1991	New York Mets	Cincinnati Reds	5th	Herm Winningham, Randy Myers, Mariano Duncan	
Pete Harnisch	September 6, 1991	Houston Astros	Philadelphia Phillies	7th	Wes Chamberlain, Dickie Thon, José DeJesús	
Trevor Wilson	June 7, 1992	San Francisco Giants	Houston Astros	9th	Jeff Bagwell, Eric Anthony, Rafael Ramírez	
Mel Rojas	May 11, 1994	Montreal Expos	New York Mets	9th	David Segui, Todd Hundley, Jeff McKnight	
Stan Belinda	August 6, 1994	Kansas City Royals	Seattle Mariners	9th	Eric Anthony (2), Chris Howard, Luis Sojo	
Todd Worrell	August 13, 1995	Los Angeles Dodgers	Pittsburgh Pirates	9th	Mark Johnson, Angelo Encarnación, Steve Pegues	
Mike Magnante	August 22, 1997	Houston Astros	Colorado Rockies	9th	Ellis Burks, Harvey Pulliam, Jeff Reed (2)	
Doug Jones	September 23, 1997	Milwaukee Brewers	Kansas City Royals	9th	Johnny Damon, Scott Cooper, Rod Myers	
Jimmy Key	April 14, 1998	Baltimore Orioles	Chicago White Sox	2nd	Robin Ventura, Magglio Ordóñez, Ray Durham	
Orel Hershiser	June 16, 1998	San Francisco Giants	Colorado Rockies	4th	Ellis Burks (2), Vinny Castilla, Todd Helton	
Jesús Sánchez	September 13, 1998	Florida Marlins	Atlanta Braves	3rd	Tony Graffanino, Greg Maddux, Walt Weiss	
Shane Reynolds	July 15, 1999	Houston Astros	Detroit Tigers	1st	Juan Encarnación, Brad Ausmus, Bobby Higginson	
B. J. Ryan	September 5, 1999	Baltimore Orioles	Cleveland Indians	6th	Manny Ramirez, Jim Thome, Richie Sexson	
Randy Johnson^{†}	August 23, 2001	Arizona Diamondbacks	Pittsburgh Pirates	6th	Tony McKnight, Gary Matthews Jr., Jack Wilson	
Jason Isringhausen	April 13, 2002	St. Louis Cardinals	Houston Astros	9th	Daryle Ward, José Vizcaíno, Julio Lugo	
Byung-Hyun Kim	May 11, 2002	Arizona Diamondbacks	Philadelphia Phillies	8th	Scott Rolen, Mike Lieberthal, Pat Burrell	
Pedro Martínez^{†}	May 18, 2002	Boston Red Sox	Seattle Mariners	1st	Ichiro Suzuki, Mark McLemore, Rubén Sierra	
Brian Lawrence	June 12, 2002	San Diego Padres	Baltimore Orioles	3rd	Brook Fordyce, Jerry Hairston Jr., Melvin Mora	
Brandon Backe	April 15, 2004	Houston Astros	Milwaukee Brewers	8th	Bill Hall, Scott Podsednik, Craig Counsell	
Ben Sheets	June 13, 2004	Milwaukee Brewers	Houston Astros	3rd	Pete Munro, Craig Biggio, José Vizcaíno (2)	
LaTroy Hawkins	September 11, 2004	Chicago Cubs	Florida Marlins	9th	Jeff Conine, Juan Encarnación (2), Álex González	
Rick Helling	June 20, 2006	Milwaukee Brewers	Detroit Tigers	1st	Curtis Granderson, Plácido Polanco, Iván Rodríguez	
Buddy Carlyle	July 6, 2007	Atlanta Braves	San Diego Padres	4th	Khalil Greene, Russell Branyan, José Cruz Jr.	
Rich Harden	June 8, 2008	Oakland Athletics	Los Angeles Angels	1st	Maicer Izturis, Howie Kendrick, Garret Anderson	
Félix Hernández	June 17, 2008	Seattle Mariners	Florida Marlins	4th	Jeremy Hermida, Jorge Cantú, Mike Jacobs	
A. J. Burnett	June 20, 2009	New York Yankees	Florida Marlins	3rd	Josh Johnson, Chris Coghlan, Emilio Bonifacio	
Ross Ohlendorf	September 5, 2009	Pittsburgh Pirates	St. Louis Cardinals	7th	Khalil Greene (2), Julio Lugo (2), Jason LaRue	
Rafael Soriano	August 23, 2010	Tampa Bay Rays	Los Angeles Angels	9th	Erick Aybar, Mike Napoli, Peter Bourjos	
Jordan Zimmermann	May 6, 2011	Washington Nationals	Florida Marlins	2nd	Giancarlo Stanton, Greg Dobbs, John Buck	
Juan Pérez	July 8, 2011	Philadelphia Phillies	Atlanta Braves	10th	Jason Heyward, Nate McLouth, Wilkin Ramírez	
Clay Buchholz	August 16, 2012	Boston Red Sox	Baltimore Orioles	6th	Adam Jones, Matt Wieters, Chris Davis	
Wade Miley^{‡}	October 1, 2012	Arizona Diamondbacks	Colorado Rockies	3rd	Jonathan Herrera, Drew Pomeranz, Josh Rutledge	
Iván Nova	May 29, 2013	New York Yankees	New York Mets	8th	Ike Davis, Mike Baxter, Rubén Tejada	
Steve Delabar	July 30, 2013	Toronto Blue Jays	Oakland Athletics	8th	Adam Rosales, Coco Crisp, Chris Young	
Brad Boxberger	May 8, 2014	Tampa Bay Rays	Baltimore Orioles	6th	Steve Pearce, Jonathan Schoop, Caleb Joseph	
Cole Hamels	May 17, 2014	Philadelphia Phillies	Cincinnati Reds	3rd	Zack Cozart, Brandon Phillips, Todd Frazier	
Justin Masterson	June 2, 2014	Cleveland Indians	Boston Red Sox	4th	Jonny Gomes, Grady Sizemore, Stephen Drew	
Garrett Richards	June 4, 2014	Los Angeles Angels	Houston Astros	2nd	Jon Singleton, Matt Dominguez, Chris Carter	
Rex Brothers	June 14, 2014	Colorado Rockies	San Francisco Giants	8th	Michael Morse, Brandon Crawford, Gregor Blanco	
Carlos Contreras^{‡}	July 11, 2014	Cincinnati Reds	Pittsburgh Pirates	7th	Jordy Mercer, Jeff Locke, Gregory Polanco	
Brandon McCarthy	September 17, 2014	New York Yankees	Tampa Bay Rays	7th	Wil Myers, Nick Franklin, Matt Joyce	
Mike Fiers	May 7, 2015	Milwaukee Brewers	Los Angeles Dodgers	4th	Enrique Hernández, Carlos Frías, Joc Pederson	
Santiago Casilla	May 17, 2015	San Francisco Giants	Cincinnati Reds	9th	Marlon Byrd, Brandon Phillips (2), Jay Bruce	
Juan Nicasio	July 4, 2016	Pittsburgh Pirates	St. Louis Cardinals	8th	Stephen Piscotty, Jhonny Peralta, Yadier Molina	
Drew Storen	April 18, 2017	Cincinnati Reds	Baltimore Orioles	9th	Jonathan Schoop (2), J. J. Hardy, Hyun-soo Kim	
Craig Kimbrel^{‡}	May 11, 2017	Boston Red Sox	Milwaukee Brewers	9th	Hernán Pérez, Travis Shaw, Domingo Santana	
Max Scherzer^{‡}	May 14, 2017	Washington Nationals	Philadelphia Phillies	5th	César Hernández, Odúbel Herrera, Aaron Altherr	
Kenley Jansen^{‡}	May 18, 2017	Los Angeles Dodgers	Miami Marlins	9th	Derek Dietrich, J. T. Riddle, Ichiro Suzuki (2)	
Carlos Carrasco^{‡}	July 7, 2017	Cleveland Indians	Detroit Tigers	5th	Nicholas Castellanos, Mikie Mahtook, José Iglesias	
Dellin Betances	August 2, 2017	New York Yankees	Detroit Tigers	8th	Jim Adduci, Justin Upton, Miguel Cabrera	
José Alvarado^{‡}	August 4, 2017	Tampa Bay Rays	Milwaukee Brewers	9th	Travis Shaw (2), Jesús Aguilar, Hernán Pérez (2)	
Rick Porcello	August 9, 2017	Boston Red Sox	Tampa Bay Rays	5th	Trevor Plouffe, Wilson Ramos, Mallex Smith	
Kevin Gausman^{‡}	April 23, 2018	Baltimore Orioles	Cleveland Indians	7th	Yonder Alonso, Yan Gomes, Bradley Zimmer	
Max Scherzer^{‡} (2)	June 5, 2018	Washington Nationals	Tampa Bay Rays	6th	Johnny Field, Christian Arroyo, Daniel Robertson	
Germán Márquez^{‡}	August 8, 2018	Colorado Rockies	Pittsburgh Pirates	4th	Corey Dickerson, Starling Marte, Gregory Polanco (2)	
Zac Rosscup^{‡}	August 19, 2018	Los Angeles Dodgers	Seattle Mariners	9th	Kyle Seager, Ryon Healy, Cameron Maybin	
Josh Hader^{‡}	March 30, 2019	Milwaukee Brewers	St. Louis Cardinals	9th	Tyler O'Neill, Dexter Fowler, Yairo Muñoz	
Thomas Pannone^{‡}	April 14, 2019	Toronto Blue Jays	Tampa Bay Rays	5th	Avisaíl García, Brandon Lowe, Daniel Robertson (2)	
Chris Sale^{‡}	May 8, 2019	Boston Red Sox	Baltimore Orioles	7th	Hanser Alberto, Dwight Smith Jr., Steve Wilkerson	
Chris Sale^{‡} (2)	June 5, 2019	Boston Red Sox	Kansas City Royals	8th	Kelvin Gutiérrez, Nicky Lopez, Martin Maldonado	
Stephen Strasburg	July 3, 2019	Washington Nationals	Miami Marlins	4th	Garrett Cooper, Neil Walker, Starlin Castro	
Kevin Gausman^{‡} (2)	August 18, 2019	Cincinnati Reds	St. Louis Cardinals	9th	Yairo Muñoz (2), Dexter Fowler (2), Tommy Edman	
Chris Martin^{‡}	September 11, 2019	Atlanta Braves	Philadelphia Phillies	7th	César Hernández (2), Jay Bruce (2), Logan Morrison	
Will Harris	September 27, 2019	Houston Astros	Los Angeles Angels	8th	Kaleb Cowart, Matt Thaiss, Michael Hermosillo	
Zach Plesac^{‡}	September 18, 2020	Cleveland Indians	Detroit Tigers	2nd	Jorge Bonifacio, Niko Goodrum, Austin Romine	
Kyle Finnegan^{‡}	May 5, 2021	Washington Nationals	Atlanta Braves	6th	Austin Riley, Dansby Swanson, William Contreras	
Michael King^{‡}	June 4, 2021	New York Yankees	Boston Red Sox	4th	Hunter Renfroe, Marwin Gonzalez, Christian Vázquez	
Chad Green^{‡}	July 4, 2021	New York Yankees	New York Mets	7th	Michael Conforto, Jeff McNeil, Jonathan Villar	
Chris Sale^{‡} (3)	August 26, 2021	Boston Red Sox	Minnesota Twins	3rd	Nick Gordon, Andrelton Simmons, Rob Refsnyder	
Max Scherzer^{‡} (3)	September 12, 2021	Los Angeles Dodgers	San Diego Padres	2nd	Fernando Tatís Jr., Eric Hosmer, Tommy Pham	
Nestor Cortes Jr.^{‡}	April 17, 2022	New York Yankees	Baltimore Orioles	4th	Robinson Chirinos, Chris Owings, Kelvin Gutiérrez (2)	
Luis García^{‡}	June 15, 2022	Houston Astros	Texas Rangers	2nd	Nathaniel Lowe, Ezequiel Durán, Brad Miller	
Phil Maton^{‡}	June 15, 2022	Houston Astros	Texas Rangers	7th	Nathaniel Lowe (2), Ezequiel Durán (2), Brad Miller (2)	
Reid Detmers^{‡}	July 31, 2022	Los Angeles Angels	Texas Rangers	2nd	Ezequiel Durán (3), Kole Calhoun, Charlie Culberson	
Ryan Helsley^{‡}	September 16, 2022	St. Louis Cardinals	Cincinnati Reds	9th	Kyle Farmer, Jake Fraley, Donovan Solano	
Hayden Wesneski^{‡}	September 22, 2022	Chicago Cubs	Pittsburgh Pirates	5th	Jack Suwinski, Zack Collins, Jason Delay	
Enyel De Los Santos^{‡}	September 27, 2022	Cleveland Guardians	Tampa Bay Rays	7th	Christian Bethancourt, Jose Siri, Taylor Walls	
Colin Holderman^{‡}	May 4, 2023	Pittsburgh Pirates	Tampa Bay Rays	7th	Taylor Walls (2), Luke Raley, Christian Bethancourt (2)	
Johan Oviedo^{‡}	May 24, 2023	Pittsburgh Pirates	Texas Rangers	4th	Josh Smith, Robbie Grossman, Jonah Heim	
Michael Kopech^{‡}	July 10, 2024	Chicago White Sox	Minnesota Twins	9th	Brooks Lee, Matt Wallner, Max Kepler	
Ryan Pepiot^{‡}	September 18, 2024	Tampa Bay Rays	Boston Red Sox	5th	Connor Wong, Wilyer Abreu, Triston Casas	
Cal Quantrill^{‡}	May 18, 2025	Miami Marlins	Tampa Bay Rays	4th	Jonathan Aranda, Christopher Morel, Kameron Misner	
Brandon Young^{‡}	July 8, 2025	Baltimore Orioles	New York Mets	5th	Jesse Winker, Jeff McNeil, Luis Torrens	
Andrew Kittredge^{‡}	August 6, 2025	Chicago Cubs	Cincinnati Reds	7th	Tyler Stephenson, Gavin Lux, Ke'Bryan Hayes	
Mason Miller^{‡}	September 3, 2025	San Diego Padres	Baltimore Orioles	8th	Jeremiah Jackson, Ryan Mountcastle, Emmanuel Rivera	
Michael Soroka^{‡}	March 30, 2026	Arizona Diamondbacks	Detroit Tigers	5th	Javier Báez, Kerry Carpenter, Gleyber Torres	
Gavin Williams^{‡}	July 23, 2026	Cleveland Guardians	Minnesota Twins	4th	Byron Buxton, Ryan Jeffers, Josh Bell	
Taj Bradley^{‡}	August 25, 2026	Minnesota Twins	Athletics	5th	Carlos Cortes, Brian Serven, Henry Bolte	
Justin Martinez^{‡}	September 11, 2026	Arizona Diamondbacks	Texas Rangers	6th	Wyatt Langford, Evan Carter, Jake Burger	
Payton Tolle^{‡}	September 13, 2026	Boston Red Sox	Kansas City Royals	1st	Nick Loftin, Bobby Witt Jr., Jac Caglianone	

== See also ==
- List of Major League Baseball single-inning strikeout leaders
