= Payton Tolle =

American baseball player (born 2002)

Boston Red Sox – No. 70
- Pitcher
- Born: November 1, 2002 (age 23); Stillwater, Oklahoma, U.S.
- Bats: Left Throws: Left

MLB debut
- August 29, 2025, for the Boston Red Sox

MLB statistics (through 2026 season)
- Win–loss record: 9–7
- Earned run average: 3.33
- Strikeouts: 190
- Stats at Baseball Reference

Teams
- Boston Red Sox (2025–present)

Career highlights and awards
- Pitched an immaculate inning on September 13, 2026

Payton John Tolle (born November 1, 2002) is an American professional baseball pitcher for the Boston Red Sox of Major League Baseball (MLB). He made his MLB debut in 2025.

== Amateur career ==
Tolle attended Bethany High School in Bethany, Oklahoma. He enrolled at Wichita State University, where he played college baseball as a two-way player for the Wichita State Shockers. He batted .320 and pitched to a 9–2 win–loss record for the Shockers as a sophomore in 2023 and was a finalist for the John Olerud Award.

After the 2023 season, Tolle transferred to Texas Christian University (TCU) to play for the TCU Horned Frogs. In his lone year at TCU in 2024, he was named the Big 12 Pitcher of the Year after going 7–4 with a 3.21 earned run average (ERA) and 125 strikeouts in 81 1/3 innings pitched.

== Professional career ==
=== Draft and minor leagues ===
The Boston Red Sox selected Tolle in the second round of the 2024 Major League Baseball draft and signed for $2 million. He signed with the Red Sox and made his professional debut in 2025 with the Greenville Drive, was promoted to the Portland Sea Dogs in June, and was promoted to the Worcester Red Sox in early August. Across three minor league levels, Tolle recorded a 3.04 ERA, 0.99 WHIP and 133 strikeouts over 91 2/3 innings.

=== Boston Red Sox (2025–present) ===
==== 2025: MLB debut ====
On August 29, 2025, Tolle was called up to the Red Sox and made his major league debut that evening, against the Pittsburgh Pirates. Tolle pitched 5 2/3 innings allowing two earned runs, three hits, and two walks while recording eight strikeouts. After struggling in his next two starts against the Arizona Diamondbacks and Athletics, Tolle was moved to the bullpen for the remainder of the season.

Following the 2025 regular season, Tolle was added to the playoff roster for the AL Wild Card Series against the New York Yankees.

==== 2026 ====
Tolle was optioned to Triple-A Worcester to begin the 2026 season. He was called up to the Red Sox on April 23, 2026. On May 4, Tolle recorded his first career win, allowing two unearned runs in seven innings pitched against the Detroit Tigers. On August 7, Tolle recorded a career-high 14 strikeouts over six innings against the Athletics, helping Boston secure its ninth consecutive win. In doing so, he became the youngest Red Sox pitcher to reach the 14-strikeout threshold since Roger Clemens. On September 13, Tolle recorded the first immaculate inning of his career against the Kansas City Royals, and the first recorded by a Red Sox pitcher since Chris Sale's third career immaculate inning in 2021.

== Personal life ==
Tolle married his longtime girlfriend, Devin Melton, during the 2026 All-Star break.

Tolle's mother, Jina, died from cancer in 2024. Tolle pays tribute to her with the words "you're so pretty" inscribed on his glove. Jina would yell those words to playfully embarrass Tolle in front of his friends and teammates.

Tolle is a Christian. He was baptized in January 2026. He has said, "I think I just hope my platform can give others hope. I have been through some hard things during the past few years, and I want to show people that by trusting God, you can make it through and have a good attitude. I feel like I have a unique opportunity to show others the love of Jesus with the platform He has blessed me with."
