= Jack Perkins (baseball) =

American baseball player (born 1999)

Athletics – No. 50
- Pitcher
- Born: December 26, 1999 (age 26); Kokomo, Indiana, U.S.
- Bats: Right Throws: Right

MLB debut
- June 22, 2025, for the Athletics

MLB statistics (through 2026 season)
- Win–loss record: 6–15
- Earned run average: 5.64
- Strikeouts: 177
- Stats at Baseball Reference

Teams
- Athletics (2025–present)

Jackson Scott Perkins (born December 26, 1999) is an American professional baseball pitcher for the Athletics of Major League Baseball (MLB). He made his MLB debut in 2025.

== Amateur career ==
Perkins attended Kokomo High School in Kokomo, Indiana, where he played football and baseball. He was selected by the Atlanta Braves in the 39th round of the 2018 Major League Baseball draft, but did not sign and instead honored his commitment to play college baseball at the University of Louisville for the Louisville Cardinals baseball team.

Perkins made his collegiate debut with Louisville in 2019 as a freshman. He pitched a total of 32 1/3 innings for the year, recording a 3–0 win–loss record with a 4.18 earned run average (ERA) and 37 strikeouts. He underwent elbow surgery after the season, and did not make an appearance in 2020 while recovering. He returned to pitch in 2021, pitching 16 innings and compiling a 7.31 ERA. After the season, he transferred to Indiana University. He started 15 games for Indiana in 2022 and went 3–4 with a 5.10 ERA and 91 strikeouts over 83 innings.

== Professional career ==
The Oakland Athletics selected Perkins in the fifth round (154th overall) of the 2022 Major League Baseball draft. Perkins made his professional debut with the rookie-level Arizona Complex League Athletics and also played for the Single-A Stockton Ports, pitching ten innings between the two affiliates.

To open the 2023 season, Perkins was assigned to the High-A Lansing Lugnuts before being promoted to the Double-A Midland RockHounds. Over 22 games (twenty starts) between the two teams, Perkins went 4–3 with a 4.10 ERA and 93 strikeouts over 107 2/3 innings. After the season, he was selected to play in the Arizona Fall League for the Mesa Solar Sox, with whom he did not allow a run over ten appearances. Perkins spent the 2024 season back with Midland and missed time due to a lat injury, but still started 15 games and went 4–1 with a 2.96 ERA and 100 strikeouts in 76 innings.

Perkins missed the start of the 2025 season due to injury but made his season debut in May with the Triple-A Las Vegas Aviators. In nine starts, he posted a 3–2 record and 2.86 ERA with 68 strikeouts over 44 innings of work. On June 22, 2025, Perkins was promoted to the major leagues for the first time. He made his MLB debut that night versus the Cleveland Guardians at Sutter Health Park, pitching three scoreless innings in relief with two strikeouts. On June 28, Perkins recorded his first career save, pitching 3 1/3 scoreless innings of a 7–0 victory over the New York Yankees. On August 9, he recorded his first career win, allowing three runs over six innings pitched against the Baltimore Orioles. On August 22, Perkins was placed on the injured list with a right shoulder strain. Perkins made 12 appearances (four starts) for the Athletics during his rookie campaign, compiling a 3–2 record and 4.19 ERA with 37 strikeouts across 38 2/3 innings pitched.

Perkins was optioned to Triple-A Las Vegas to begin the 2026 season. He was recalled by the Athletics on April 9. In June, Perkins was moved into the team's starting rotation. On September 4, he was optioned back to Las Vegas. He was recalled the following day after J. T. Ginn was placed on the injured list. Perkins pitched in 37 games (17 starts) for the Athletics in 2026 and ended the season with a 3–13 record, 6.10 ERA, 140 strikeouts, and a 1.45 walks plus hits per inning pitched (WHIP) across 121 innings pitched.
