= José Suárez (baseball, born 1998) =

Venezuelan baseball player (born 1998)

Free agent
- Pitcher
- Born: January 3, 1998 (age 28); Naguanagua, Venezuela
- Bats: Left Throws: Left

MLB debut
- June 2, 2019, for the Los Angeles Angels

MLB statistics (through 2026 season)
- Win–loss record: 23–33
- Earned run average: 5.37
- Strikeouts: 423
- Stats at Baseball Reference

Teams
- Los Angeles Angels (2019–2024); Atlanta Braves (2025–2026); Seattle Mariners (2026); Athletics (2026)

José Rances Suárez Quintero (born January 3, 1998) is a Venezuelan professional baseball pitcher who is a free agent. He has previously played in Major League Baseball (MLB) for the Los Angeles Angels, Atlanta Braves, Seattle Mariners, and Athletics.

A native of Naguanagua, Venezuela, Suárez signed with the Angels as an international free agent at the age of 16 in 2014. After spending five seasons in the Angels farm system, he made his MLB debut in 2019. On September 4, 2021, Suárez threw the first complete game of his career.

== Career ==
=== Los Angeles Angels ===
Suárez signed with the Los Angeles Angels as an international free agent on July 3, 2014. He spent his first professional season in 2015 with the Dominican Summer League Angels and Arizona League Angels, compiling a combined 3-3 record and 2.97 ERA in 15 games (13 starts). In 2016, he pitched for the Arizona League Angels and Orem Owlz where he was 1-4 with a 4.84 ERA in 12 games (six starts).

Suárez played 2017 with the Arizona League Angels and Burlington Bees where he pitched to a combined 6-1 record and 3.28 ERA in 15 starts. He started 2018 with the Inland Empire 66ers and was promoted to the Mobile BayBears and Salt Lake Bees during the season. In 26 starts between the three clubs, he pitched to a 3-6 record with 3.92 ERA.

The Angels added Suárez to their 40-man roster after the 2018 season. He opened the 2019 season on the injured list with shoulder soreness, and was assigned back to Salt Lake upon his return. On June 2, Suárez was promoted to the major leagues for the first time to start versus the Seattle Mariners, where he picked up his first major league win. He finished the season with a 7.11 ERA in 81 innings, allowing 23 home runs. In 2020, Suárez recorded a 38.57 ERA after two starts lasting 2 1/3 innings in total before being optioned off the roster.

Suárez made his first major league appearance of the 2021 season on May 10 against the Houston Astros. He pitched four innings, allowing one run. He was the starting pitcher in the 2021 MLB Little League Classic. In four innings, Suárez gave up three runs and struck out four in the 3-0 loss to the Cleveland Indians. On September 4, 2021, against the Texas Rangers, Suárez pitched his first complete game, allowing one run and striking out eight batters. In 23 games (14 starts), he logged an 8–8 record and 3.75 ERA with 85 strikeouts in 98 1/3 innings pitched.

In 2022, Suárez made 22 appearances (20 starts) and registered an 8–8 record and 3.96 ERA with 103 strikeouts in 109.0 innings of work. The year marked his second consecutive season going 8–8 with an ERA under 4.00, and he set new career–highs in strikeouts and innings pitched.

Suárez began the 2023 season out of the Angels' rotation, struggling to a 7.89 ERA across his first five starts. In a May 7 outing against the Texas Rangers, Suárez departed after 2 2/3 innings (in which he allowed 7 earned runs) with an apparent injury. An MRI revealed a left shoulder strain, and he was placed on the injured list the following day. He was transferred to the 60-day injured list on June 23. Suárez was activated from the injured list on September 11.

In 2024, Suárez made 18 appearances for the Angels and struggled to an 8.15 ERA with 37 strikeouts across 35 1/3 innings pitched. On June 17, 2024, Suárez was designated for assignment. He cleared waivers and was sent outright to Salt Lake on June 24. On September 9, the Angels selected Suárez's contract, adding him to their active roster.

=== Atlanta Braves ===
On March 23, 2025, Suárez was traded to the Atlanta Braves in exchange for Ian Anderson. Suárez was designated for assignment on April 21, following the acquisition of Scott Blewett. He cleared waivers and was sent outright to the Triple-A Gwinnett Stripers on April 24. On September 16, the Braves selected Suárez's contract, adding him back to their active roster. He made seven total appearances (including one start) for Atlanta, compiling a 2-0 record and 1.86 ERA with 16 strikeouts and one save across 19 1/3 innings pitched.

On January 15, 2026, Suárez was claimed off waivers by the Baltimore Orioles. He was designated for assignment following the acquisition of Weston Wilson on January 22. On January 26, Suárez was claimed back off waivers by the Braves. In eight appearances for Atlanta, he struggled to a 6.61 ERA with 21 strikeouts across 16 1/3 innings pitched. Suárez was designated for assignment by the Braves on May 1.

=== Seattle Mariners ===
On May 3, 2026, Suárez was claimed off of waivers by the Seattle Mariners. He made one appearance for Seattle, allowing one run with three strikeouts in two innings pitched against the Chicago White Sox on May 9. On May 12, the Mariners designated Suárez for assignment.

=== Athletics ===
On May 14, 2026, the Mariners traded Suárez to the Athletics in exchange for cash considerations. He made 36 appearances (including one start) for the team, compiling a 1–3 record and 5.65 ERA with 37 strikeouts over 43 innings of work. Suárez was designated for assignment by the Athletics on September 2. On September 8, Suárez was released.

== See also ==
- List of Major League Baseball players from Venezuela
