= Joel Kuhnel =

American baseball player (born 1995)

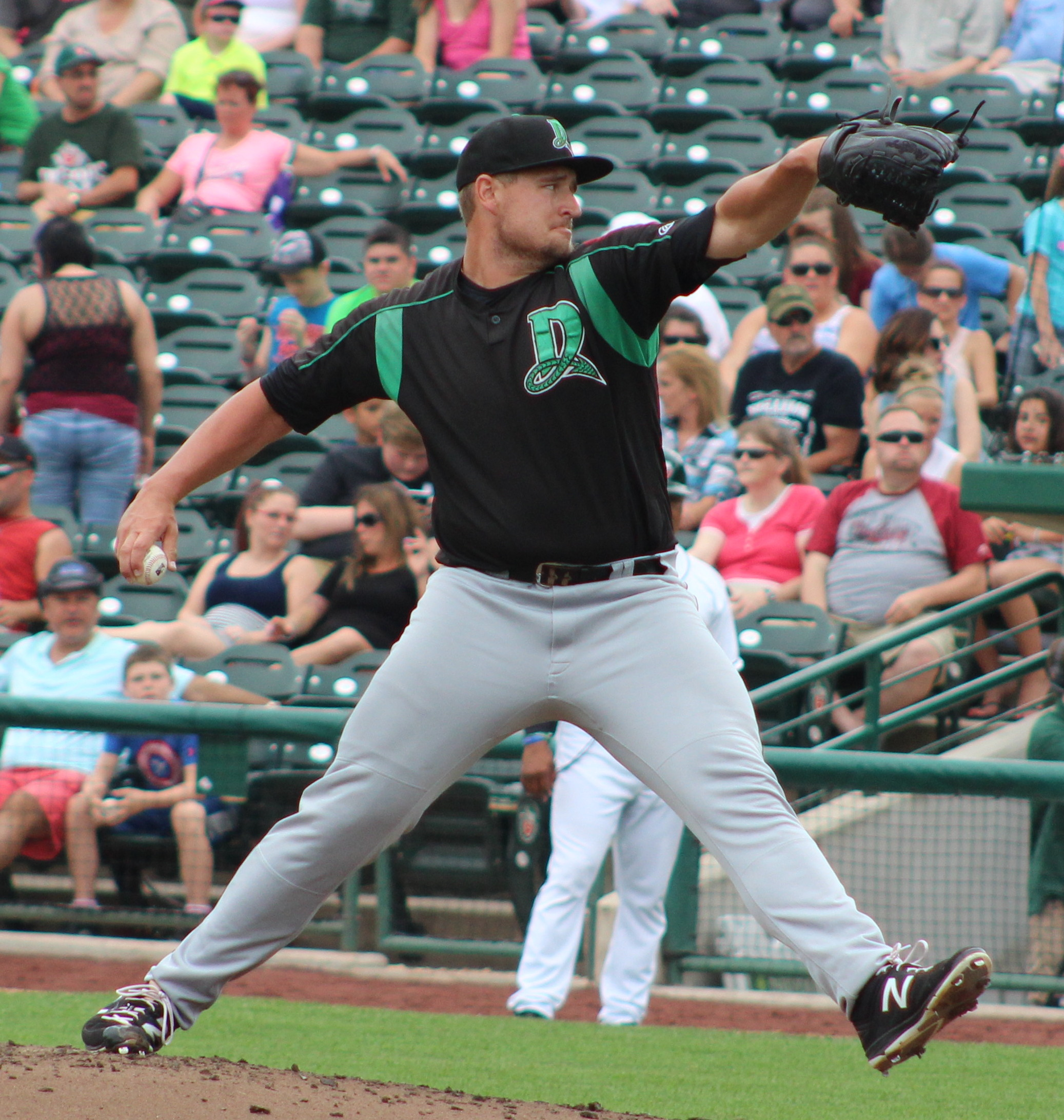
- Kuhnel with the Dayton Dragons in 2017

New York Mets
- Pitcher
- Born: February 19, 1995 (age 31); Goldsboro, North Carolina, U.S.
- Bats: Right Throws: Right

MLB debut
- August 16, 2019, for the Cincinnati Reds

MLB statistics (through 2026 season)
- Win–loss record: 5–6
- Earned run average: 5.39
- Strikeouts: 104
- Stats at Baseball Reference

Teams
- Cincinnati Reds (2019–2020, 2022–2023); Houston Astros (2023–2024); Tampa Bay Rays (2024); Athletics (2026); Milwaukee Brewers (2026); San Francisco Giants (2026)

Joel Kenneth Kuhnel (born February 19, 1995) is an American professional baseball pitcher in the New York Mets organization. He has previously played in Major League Baseball (MLB) for the Cincinnati Reds, Houston Astros, Tampa Bay Rays, Athletics, Milwaukee Brewers, and San Francisco Giants.

== Amateur career ==
Kuhnel attended Sunrise Mountain High School in Peoria, Arizona. Undrafted in the 2013 Major League Baseball draft, he enrolled at Central Arizona College where he played college baseball.

As a freshman at Central Arizona in 2014, Kuhnel pitched to a 2–0 record with a 1.62 ERA over 39 innings. After the season, he transferred to the University of Texas at Arlington. In 2015, his first season with UTA, he went 4–4 with a 3.55 ERA over 16 games (12 starts). As a junior in 2016, Kuhnel compiled a 6–4 record with a 2.99 ERA across 12 starts.

== Professional career ==
=== Cincinnati Reds ===
Kuhnel was selected by the Cincinnati Reds in the 11th round of the 2016 Major League Baseball draft. He signed with the Reds, receiving a $125,000 signing bonus. He made his professional debut with the rookie-level Billings Mustangs, pitching to a 0–1 record and a 3.43 ERA over 18 relief appearances. In 2017, he pitched with the Single-A Dayton Dragons and compiled a 2–4 record, a 4.36 ERA, and 54 strikeouts over 64 relief innings pitched. In 2018, he played for the High-A Daytona Tortugas, with whom he was named a Florida State League All-Star, going 1–4 with a 3.04 ERA in 44 games pitched out of the bullpen. Kuhnel began 2019 with the Double-A Chattanooga Lookouts, earning Southern League All-Star honors, and was promoted to the Triple-A Louisville Bats in June. Over 41 relief appearances between the two teams, he went 5–3 with a 2.18 ERA and fifty strikeouts over 53 2/3 innings.

On August 15, 2019, the Reds selected Kuhnel's contract and promoted him to the major leagues. He made his major league debut on August 16 versus the St. Louis Cardinals. He pitched a total of 9 2/3 innings for the Reds in 2019, going 1–0 with a 4.66 ERA and nine strikeouts. In 2020, Kuhnel pitched to a 6.00 ERA over three games and three innings pitched. On October 26, 2020, he was outrighted off of the 40-man roster. He spent all of 2021 in the minor leagues, but he missed a majority of the season while dealing with a shoulder injury, pitching only eight innings during the year.

He was assigned to Triple-A Louisville to begin the 2022 season. On May 8, 2022, Kuhnel was selected to the 40-man and active rosters. In 53 appearances for Cincinnati, Kuhnel worked to a 6.36 ERA with 56 strikeouts and 1 save in 58.0 innings pitched.

In 2023, Kuhnel spent the majority of his time in Louisville, but struggled to a 7.13 ERA across 21 games. In 2 games for Cincinnati, he allowed 3 runs in 6 hits in 3 1/3 innings. On June 13, 2023, Kuhnel was designated for assignment by the Reds following the promotion of Daniel Duarte.

=== Houston Astros ===
On June 16, 2023, Kuhnel was traded to the Houston Astros for cash considerations. He appeared in 7 games for the Astros, registering a 4.66 ERA with 3 strikeouts across 9 2/3 innings of work.

On January 4, 2024, Kuhnel was designated for assignment to make room on the 40-man roster for Declan Cronin. He cleared waivers and was sent outright to the Triple-A Sugar Land Space Cowboys on January 10. However, Kuhnel elected free agency on January 13. Kuhnel re-signed with the Astros on a minor league contract on January 29. On April 12, Kuhnel had his contract selected to the major league roster. He made only one appearance before he was designated for assignment on April 30.

=== Toronto Blue Jays ===
On May 4, 2024, Kuhnel was traded to the Toronto Blue Jays for cash. He posted a 1.04 ERA in six games for the Triple-A Buffalo Bisons, but was designated for assignment by the Blue Jays on May 31. Kuhnel cleared waivers and elected free agency on June 4.

=== Milwaukee Brewers ===
On June 11, 2024, Kuhnel signed a minor league contract with the Milwaukee Brewers. On June 25, the Brewers selected Kuhnel's contract, adding him to their major league roster. The next day, he was designated for assignment without having appeared for the Brewers. Kuhnel cleared waivers and was sent outright to the Triple-A Nashville Sounds on June 28. On July 14, Kuhnel was added back to the major league roster. However, he was designated for assignment again on July 21, without having appeared for Milwaukee.

=== Tampa Bay Rays ===
On July 23, 2024, Kuhnel was claimed off waivers by the Tampa Bay Rays. In 5 games for the Rays, he posted a 1.13 ERA with 4 strikeouts across 8 innings pitched. On November 4, Kuhnel was removed from the 40-man roster. He rejected a minor league assignment and elected free agency.

=== Philadelphia Phillies ===
On December 21, 2024, Kuhnel signed a minor league contract with the Philadelphia Phillies. In 26 appearances for the Triple-A Lehigh Valley IronPigs, he posted a 3–1 record and 3.62 ERA with 27 strikeouts and two saves across 32 1/3 innings pitched. Kuhnel was released by the Phillies organization on July 3, 2025.

=== New York Yankees ===
On July 4, 2025, Kuhnel signed a minor league contract with the New York Yankees. In 24 appearances (two starts) for the Triple-A Scranton/Wilkes-Barre RailRiders, he posted a 1–1 record and 3.45 ERA with 29 strikeouts and five saves over 31 1/3 innings of work. Kuhnel elected free agency following the season on November 6.

=== Athletics ===
On December 16, 2025, Kuhnel signed a minor league contract with the Athletics. On April 7, 2026, the Athletics selected Kuhnel's contract, adding him to their active roster. He made 25 appearances for the team, logging a 1-2 record and 4.21 ERA with 14 strikeouts and four saves across 25 2/3 innings pitched. Kuhnel was designated for assignment by the Athletics on June 5.

=== Milwaukee Brewers (second stint) ===
On June 6, 2026, Kuhnel was traded to the Milwaukee Brewers in exchange for cash considerations. He made 10 appearances for Milwaukee, struggling to an 0–1 record and 6.52 ERA with eight strikeouts and two saves across 9 2/3 innings pitched. Kuhnel was designated for assignment by the Brewers on September 2.

=== San Francisco Giants ===
On September 4, 2026, Kuhnel was claimed off waivers by the San Francisco Giants. On September 9, Kuhnel recorded his first save with San Francisco, becoming the 11th Giant of the year to record a save, marking a franchise record. He made 10 appearances for the Giants, recording a 2.79 ERA with six strikeouts and two saves across 9 2/3 innings pitched. On November 2, Kuhnel was removed from the 40–man roster and elected free agency.

=== New York Mets ===
On November 18, 2026, Kuhnel signed a minor league contract with the New York Mets.
