= Yunior Tur =

Cuban baseball player (born 1999)

New York Mets
- Pitcher
- Born: August 9, 1999 (age 27); Havana, Cuba
- Bats: Right Throws: Right

MLB debut
- July 17, 2026, for the Athletics

MLB statistics (through 2026 season)
- Win–loss record: 0–0
- Earned run average: 16.34
- Strikeouts: 14
- Stats at Baseball Reference

Teams
- Athletics (2026)

Yunior Tur (born August 9, 1999) is a Cuban professional baseball pitcher for the New York Mets of Major League Baseball (MLB). He made his MLB debut in 2026 with the Athletics.

== Career ==
Tur played for Avispas de Santiago de Cuba of the Cuban National Series from 2018 to 2021. In December 2022, he signed a minor league contract with the Oakland Athletics.

Tur began the 2026 season with the Triple–A Las Vegas Aviators. On July 15, 2026, the Athletics selected Tur's contract, adding him to their active roster.
