= Gage Jump =

American baseball player (born 2003)

Athletics – No. 61
- Pitcher
- Born: April 12, 2003 (age 23); Aliso Viejo, California, U.S.
- Bats: Left Throws: Left

MLB debut
- May 26, 2026, for the Athletics

MLB statistics (through 2026 season)
- Win–loss record: 6–11
- Earned run average: 5.47
- Strikeouts: 108
- Stats at Baseball Reference

Teams
- Athletics (2026–present)

Gage Lee Jump (born April 12, 2003) is an American professional baseball pitcher for the Athletics of Major League Baseball (MLB). He made his MLB debut in 2026.

== Early life and amateur career ==
Jump attended JSerra Catholic High School in San Juan Capistrano, California, where he played baseball. As a senior in 2021, he went 9–0 with a 0.63 ERA. He was selected by the San Diego Padres in the 18th round of the 2021 Major League Baseball draft, but did not sign and instead enrolled at the University of California, Los Angeles, (UCLA) to play college baseball for the UCLA Bruins.

Jump made seven appearances as a freshman for UCLA in 2022, going 1–1 with a 3.86 ERA. Jump underwent Tommy John surgery and missed all of the 2023 season. After the season, he transferred to Louisiana State University (LSU) to play for the LSU Tigers. Jump pitched in 17 games (making 15 starts) for LSU in 2024, going 6–2 with a 3.47 ERA and 101 strikeouts over 83 innings.

== Professional career ==
Jump was selected by the Oakland Athletics with the 73rd overall pick in the 2024 Major League Baseball draft. He signed with the team for $2 million. He made his professional debut in 2025 with the Lansing Lugnuts and was promoted to the Midland RockHounds in mid-May. He was selected to represent the Athletics (alongside Tommy White) at the 2025 All-Star Futures Game at Truist Park. Over 26 games (24 starts) between the two teams, Jump went 9–7 with a 3.28 ERA and 131 strikeouts over 112 2/3 innings.

Jump pitched 9 2/3 innings during 2026 spring training and gave up two runs with seven strikeouts. He was assigned to the Triple-A Las Vegas Aviators to open the season. Jump made nine starts for Las Vegas and had a 0–2 record, a 4.50 ERA, and 56 strikeouts over 38 innings.

On May 26, 2026, the Athletics promoted Jump to the major leagues for first time. That same day, he made his MLB debut against the Seattle Mariners, taking the loss after allowing four runs across five innings pitched. He recorded five strikeouts and struck out the first batter he saw in the major leagues, J.P. Crawford, on three pitches. On June 2, Jump recorded his first MLB win after pitching seven innings in which he allowed one run on three hits and one walk alongside five strikeouts in a 2-1 victory over the Chicago Cubs. On September 15, he was placed on the injured list with left shoulder impingement, ending his season prematurely. Jump made 20 starts for the Athletics in 2026 and had a 6–11 record, a 5.47 ERA, and 108 strikeouts over 98 2/3 innings.
