= Mason Barnett =

American baseball player (born 2000)

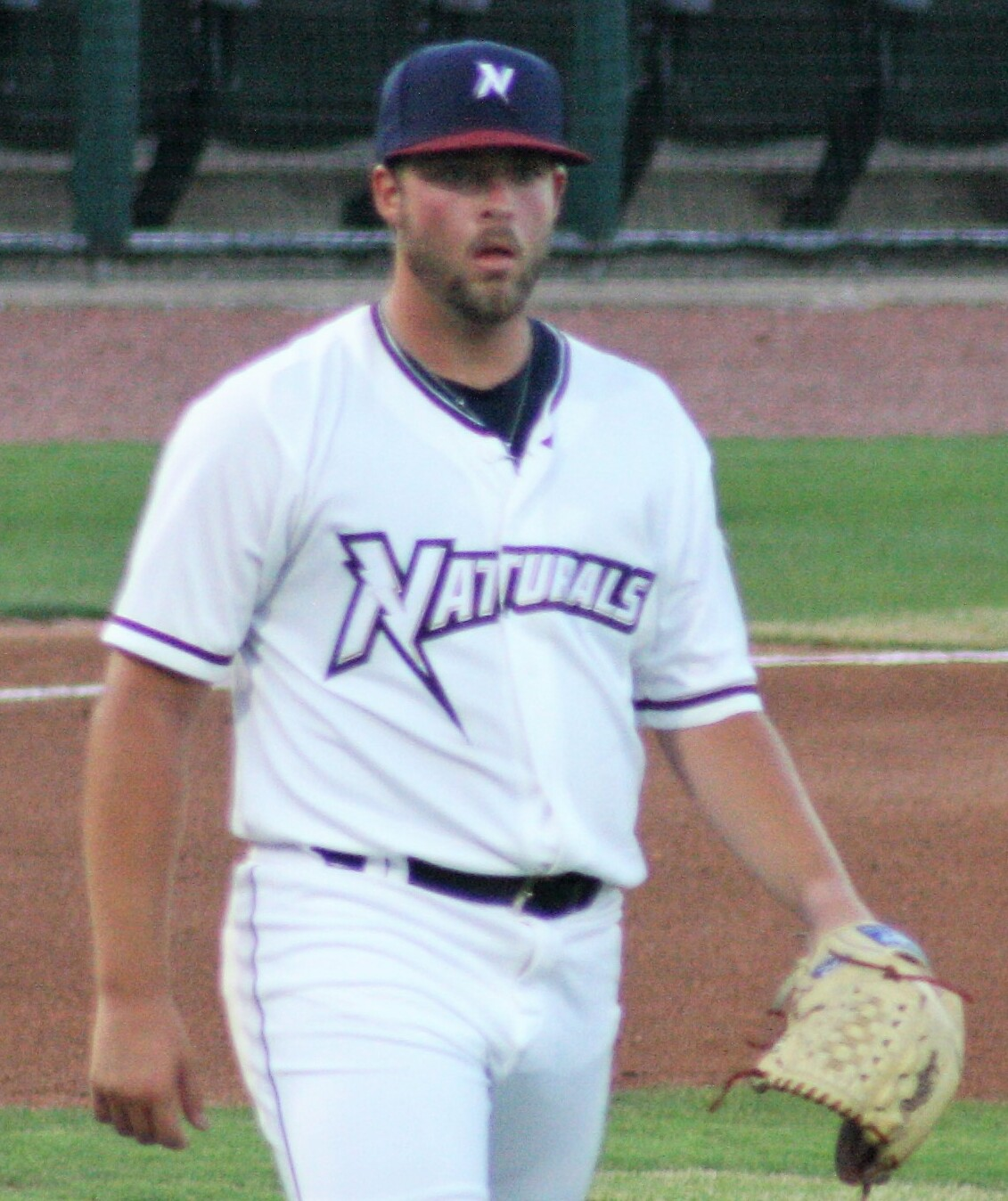
- Barnett with the Northwest Arkansas Naturals in 2023

Athletics – No. 63
- Pitcher
- Born: November 7, 2000 (age 25); Kennesaw, Georgia, U.S.
- Bats: Right Throws: Right

MLB debut
- August 30, 2025, for the Athletics

MLB statistics (through 2026 season)
- Win–loss record: 2–5
- Earned run average: 6.97
- Strikeouts: 68
- Stats at Baseball Reference

Teams
- Athletics (2025–present)

Mason McLendon Barnett (born November 7, 2000) is an American professional baseball pitcher for the Athletics of Major League Baseball (MLB). He made his MLB debut in 2025.

== Career ==
=== Amateur ===
Barnett attended Cartersville High School in Cartersville, Georgia, and Auburn University, where he played college baseball for the Auburn Tigers. In 2021, he played collegiate summer baseball with the Brewster Whitecaps of the Cape Cod Baseball League.

=== Kansas City Royals ===
The Kansas City Royals selected Barnett in the third round of the 2022 Major League Baseball draft. He signed with the Royals and spent his first professional season with the rookie-level Arizona Complex League Royals and Single-A Columbia Fireflies. Barnett started 2023 with the High-A Quad Cities River Bandits before his promotion to the Double-A Northwest Arkansas Naturals.

=== Oakland Athletics / Athletics ===
On July 30, 2024, Barnett, Will Klein, and Jared Dickey were acquired by the Oakland Athletics in exchange for Lucas Erceg. He made seven starts down the stretch for the Double-A Midland RockHounds, posting a 4-2 record and 2.61 ERA with 52 strikeouts across 41 1/3 innings pitched.

Barnett began the 2025 season with the Triple-A Las Vegas Aviators, compiling a 6-2 record and 6.13 ERA with 124 strikeouts over 119 innings of work. On August 26, 2025, Barnett was selected to the 40-man roster and promoted to the major leagues for the first time. On September 5, Barnett recorded his first career win, allowing four runs and striking out eight across five innings pitched against the Los Angeles Angels. He made five starts for the Athletics during his rookie campaign, compiling a 1-1 record and 6.85 ERA with 18 strikeouts across 22 1/3 innings pitched.

Barnett was optioned to Triple-A Las Vegas to begin the 2026 season.
