= Hayden Juenger =

American baseball player (born 2000)

Athletics – No. 58
- Pitcher
- Born: August 9, 2000 (age 26); St. Louis, Missouri, U.S.
- Bats: Right Throws: Right

MLB debut
- May 31, 2026, for the Toronto Blue Jays

MLB statistics (through 2026 season)
- Win–loss record: 0–1
- Earned run average: 9.00
- Strikeouts: 6
- Stats at Baseball Reference

Teams
- Toronto Blue Jays (2026); Athletics (2026)

Hayden Michael Juenger (born August 9, 2000) is an American professional baseball pitcher in the Athletics organization. He has previously played in Major League Baseball (MLB) for the Toronto Blue Jays.

== Amateur career ==
Juenger attended O'Fallon Township High School in O'Fallon, Illinois and played college baseball at Missouri State University. In summer 2019, he played for the Mankato MoonDogs of the Northwoods League.

== Professional career ==
=== Toronto Blue Jays ===
The Toronto Blue Jays selected Juenger in the sixth round of the 2021 Major League Baseball draft. Juenger made his professional debut with the Vancouver Canadians. In 11 games, he had a 2–0 win–loss record, 2.70 earned run average (ERA), and 34 strikeouts over 20 innings pitched.

Juenger was assigned to the Triple-A Buffalo Bisons to begin the 2026 season, where he posted a 1-2 record and 3.15 ERA with 23 strikeouts and three saves across his first 17 games. On May 30, 2026, Juenger was promoted to the major leagues for the first time. He made two appearances for the Blue Jays, recording a 13.50 ERA with no strikeouts over two innings of work. Juenger was designated for assignment by Toronto on June 23, following Shane Bieber's activation from the injured list.

=== Athletics ===
On June 27, 2026, Juenger was traded to the Athletics in exchange for Owen Carapellotti. On July 21, he was recalled from Triple-A Las Vegas and placed on the Athletics' active roster. He made his Athletics debut against the Arizona Diamondbacks on July 22.
