= Hogan Harris =

American baseball player (born 1996)

Athletics – No. 36
- Pitcher
- Born: December 26, 1996 (age 29); Lafayette, Louisiana, U.S.
- Bats: Right Throws: Left

MLB debut
- April 14, 2023, for the Oakland Athletics

MLB statistics (through 2026 season)
- Win–loss record: 13–13
- Earned run average: 4.06
- Strikeouts: 270
- Stats at Baseball Reference

Teams
- Oakland Athletics / Athletics (2023–present)

Hogan Anthony Harris (born December 26, 1996) is an American professional baseball pitcher for the Athletics of Major League Baseball (MLB). He made his MLB debut in 2023.

== Amateur career ==
Harris attended St. Thomas More Catholic High School in Lafayette, Louisiana. In 2015, his senior year, he went 6–1 with a 0.67 ERA, earning All-State honors.

Undrafted in the 2015 Major League Baseball draft, he enrolled at University of Louisiana at Lafayette where he played college baseball. In 2016, Harris' freshman year at UL Lafayette, he appeared in 16 games (two starts) in which he went 2–0 with a 3.90 ERA. That summer, he played collegiate summer baseball with the Wareham Gatemen of the Cape Cod Baseball League. As a sophomore in 2017, he compiled a 5–2 record with a 2.66 ERA over 13 games (12 starts), striking out 87 batters over 67 2/3 innings. He returned to the Cape Cod League after the season's end and played for the Yarmouth–Dennis Red Sox. In 2018, Harris' junior season, he missed the first six weeks of the season due to an oblique injury, but eventually returned and went 5–2 with a 2.62 ERA over 12 games (11 starts).

== Professional career ==
Following his junior season, Harris was selected by the Oakland Athletics in the third round of the 2018 Major League Baseball draft and signed. He made his professional debut in 2019 with the Vermont Lake Monsters of the Low–A New York–Penn League before being promoted to the Stockton Ports of the High–A California League in July. Over 15 games (13 starts) between the two clubs, Harris pitched to a 1–5 record with a 2.80 ERA, striking out 65 batters over 54 2/3 innings.

Harris did not play in a game in 2020 due to the cancellation of the minor league season because of the COVID-19 pandemic. He missed all of the 2021 season due to an undisclosed injury. He was selected to play in the Arizona Fall League for the Mesa Solar Sox after the season with whom he gave up eight earned runs and 14 walks, alongside striking out 14 batters, over ten innings. He was assigned to the Lansing Lugnuts of the High-A Midwest League to begin the 2022 season. In mid-June, he was promoted to the Midland RockHounds of the Double-A Texas League. In mid-August, he was promoted to the Las Vegas Aviators of the Triple-A Pacific Coast League. Over 23 games (22 starts) between the three teams, he went 2–4 with a 3.42 ERA and 105 strikeouts over 73 2/3 innings.

On November 15, 2022, the Athletics selected Harris's contract and added him to the 40-man roster to protect him from the Rule 5 draft. Harris was optioned to Las Vegas to begin the 2023 season.

On April 14, 2023, Harris was recalled and promoted to the major leagues for the first time. After initially appearing in three games as a reliever, Harris made his first career MLB start against Pittsburgh on June 7. Pitching five innings, Harris earned the win after giving up three earned runs. In 14 games (six starts) for Oakland, he registered a 3–6 record and 7.14 ERA with 56 strikeouts across 63 innings of work. Harris also appeared in 15 games for Triple-A Las Vegas and pitched to a 6.47 ERA over 57 innings.

Harris was optioned to Las Vegas to begin the 2024 season. He made 13 starts for Las Vegas during the season, going 3–4 with a 6.35 ERA. He also appeared in 21 games (nine starts) for the Athletics with whom he went 4–4 with a 2.86 ERA over 72 1/3 innings.

To open the 2025 season, Harris was optioned to Las Vegas. He was recalled to the Athletics on April 23, and August 9. He made 48 relief appearances for the Athletics and went 2–1 with a 3.20 ERA and 65 strikeouts over 64 2/3 innings.

In 2026, Harris was named to his first ever Opening Day roster. He made 74 relief appearances for the Athletics and had a 4–2 record, a 3.33 ERA, 88 strikeouts, and 17 saves across 70 1/3 innings.
