= Scott Blewett =

American baseball player (born 1996)

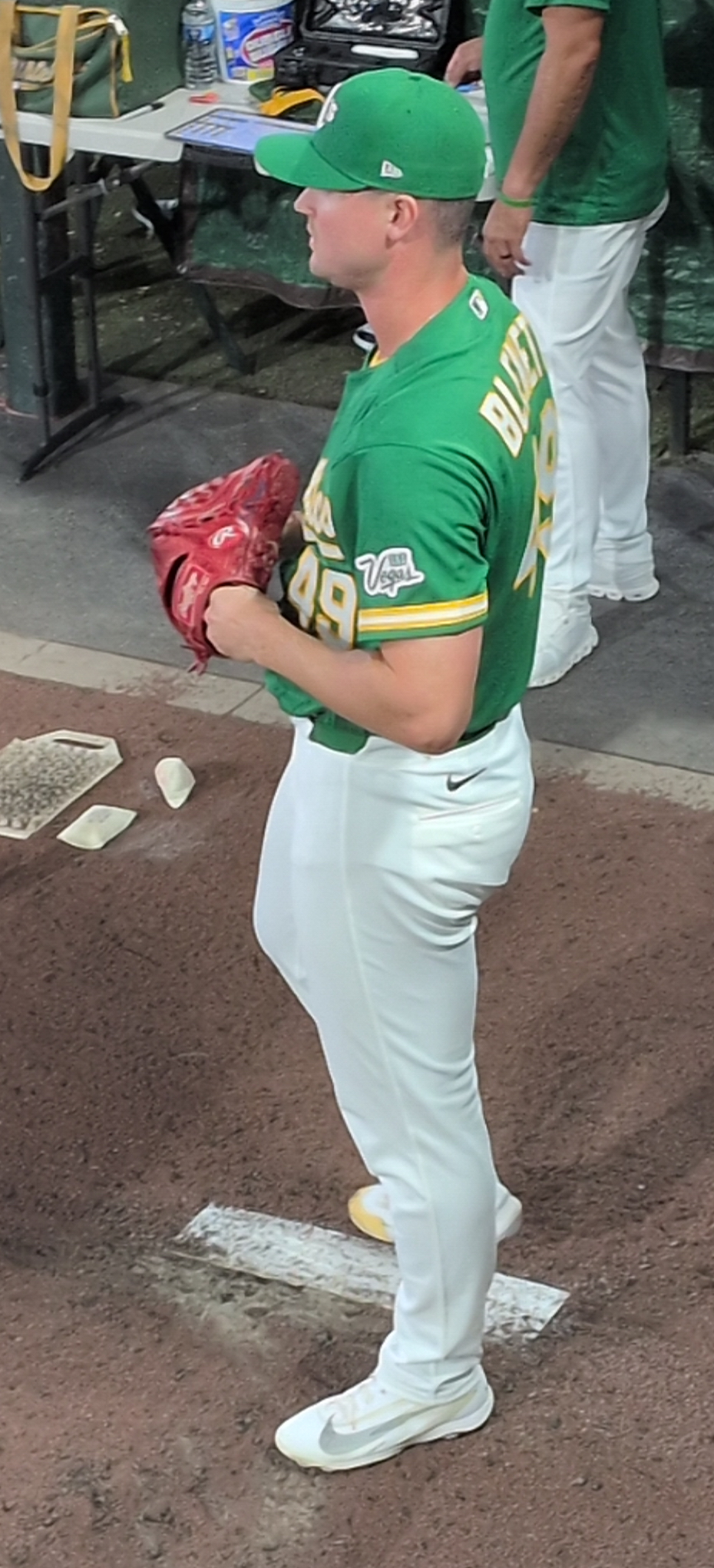
- Blewett with the Athletics in 2026

Athletics – No. 49
- Pitcher
- Born: April 10, 1996 (age 30); Syracuse, New York, U.S.
- Bats: Right Throws: Right

Professional debut
- MLB: September 18, 2020, for the Kansas City Royals
- CPBL: August 25, 2023, for the Uni-President Lions

MLB statistics (through 2026 season)
- Win–loss record: 6–3
- Earned run average: 3.85
- Strikeouts: 95

CPBL statistics (through 2023 season)
- Win–loss record: 3–3
- Earned run average: 3.95
- Strikeouts: 40
- Stats at Baseball Reference

Teams
- Kansas City Royals (2020–2021); Uni-President Lions (2023); Minnesota Twins (2024–2025); Baltimore Orioles (2025); Atlanta Braves (2025); Baltimore Orioles (2025); St. Louis Cardinals (2026); Athletics (2026–present)

Scott Thomas Blewett (/bluːˈɛt/ bloo-EHT; born April 10, 1996) is an American professional baseball pitcher for the Athletics of Major League Baseball (MLB). He has previously played in MLB for the Kansas City Royals, Minnesota Twins, Baltimore Orioles, Atlanta Braves, and St. Louis Cardinals, and in the Chinese Professional Baseball League (CPBL) for the Uni-President Lions.

== Amateur career ==
Blewett attended Charles W. Baker High School in Baldwinsville, New York. He committed to play college baseball at St. John's University. As a senior, he was the Gatorade Baseball Player of the Year for New York. Blewett was drafted by the Kansas City Royals in the second round of the 2014 Major League Baseball draft. He signed for $1.8 million.

== Professional career ==
=== Kansas City Royals ===
After signing, Blewett made his professional debut with the Burlington Royals, going 1–2 with a 4.82 ERA in eight games (seven starts). He played 2015 and 2016 with the Lexington Legends, posting a 3–5 record with a 5.20 ERA over 18 starts in 2015 and an 8–11 record with a 4.31 ERA in 25 starts in 2016, and 2017 with the Wilmington Blue Rocks, where he went 7–10 with a 4.07 ERA in a career high 152 2/3innings pitched, making 27 starts. He spent the 2018 season with the Northwest Arkansas Naturals, going 8–6 with a 4.79 ERA in 26 games (25 starts).

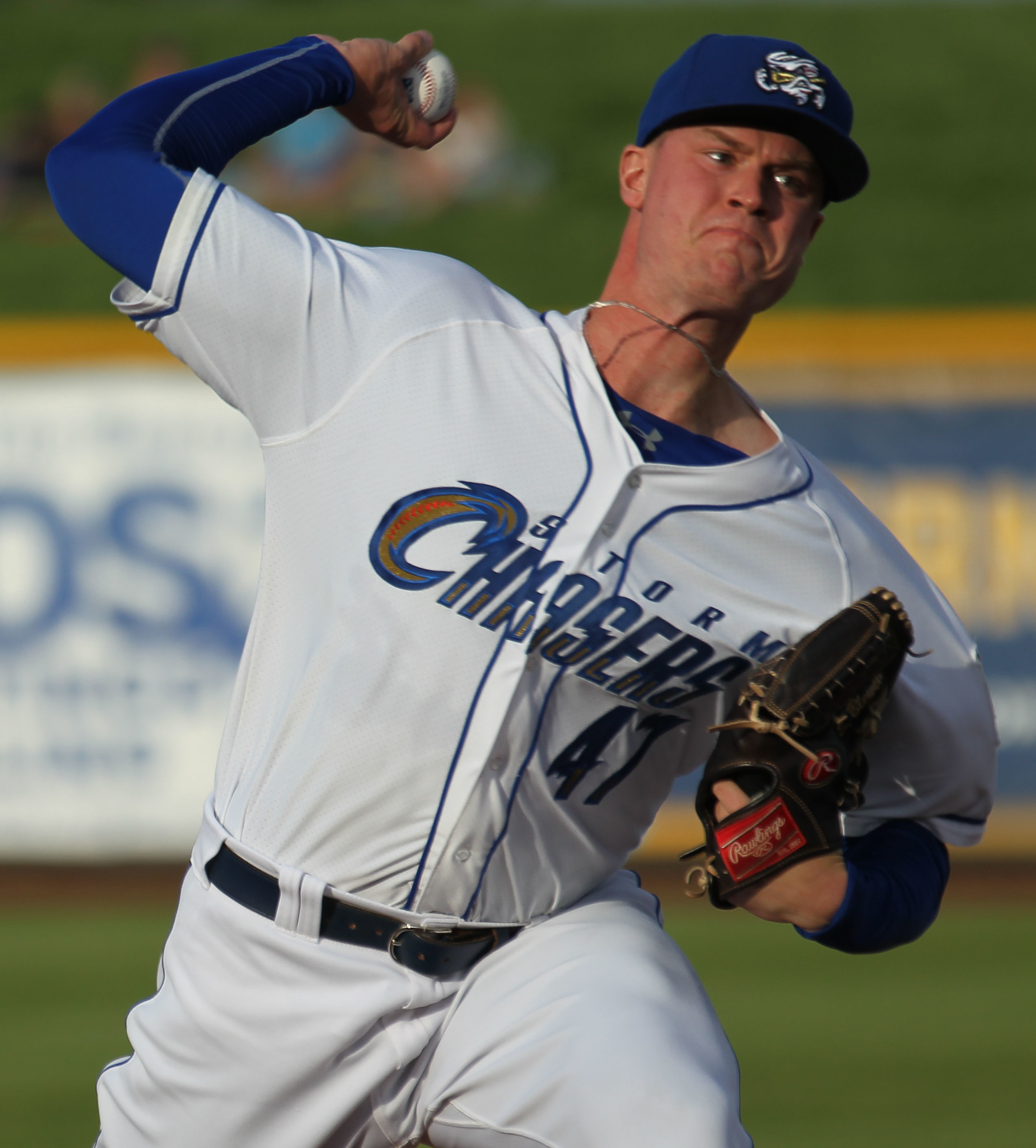
Blewett with the Omaha Storm Chasers in 2019

The Royals added Blewett to their 40-man roster after the 2018 season. He began 2019 with the Omaha Storm Chasers, and also spent time with the Naturals. Over 23 games (21 starts) between the two teams, Blewett went 6–11 with a 7.34 ERA, striking out ninety over 106 2/3 innings.

On August 5, 2020, Blewett was promoted to the major leagues for the first time. He was optioned down the next day without making a major league appearance. He was recalled on August 15, but again sent down without play a day later. On September 16, he was recalled again, and made his major league debut on September 18 against the Milwaukee Brewers, pitching 2 scoreless innings.

On April 1, 2021, Blewett was designated for assignment by the Royals. On April 6, Blewett was outrighted to the alternate training site. Blewett was selected back to the Royals roster during September, and pitched 5 innings, giving up 1 run. On October 29, Blewett elected free agency.

=== Chicago White Sox ===
On April 9, 2022, Blewett signed a minor league contract with the Chicago White Sox organization. In 27 games (25 starts) split between the Double–A Birmingham Barons and the Triple–A Charlotte Knights, he accumulated an 8–7 record and 5.78 ERA with 109 strikeouts in 123.0 innings of work. He elected free agency following the season on November 10.

=== Atlanta Braves ===
On March 29, 2023, Blewett signed a minor league contract with the Atlanta Braves organization. In 17 games (13 starts) for the Double–A Mississippi Braves, he registered a 3–4 record and 4.21 ERA with 76 strikeouts in 72 2/3 innings pitched.

=== Uni-President Lions ===
On August 12, 2023, Blewett signed with the Uni-President Lions of the Chinese Professional Baseball League (CPBL). In 7 starts for the Lions, he logged a 3–3 record and 3.95 ERA with 40 strikeouts over 41 innings of work. Blewett became a free agent following the season.

=== Minnesota Twins ===
On January 24, 2024, Blewett signed a minor league contract with the Minnesota Twins. In 36 outings for the Triple–A St. Paul Saints, he recorded a 3.66 ERA with 52 strikeouts across 51 2/3 innings pitched. On August 9, the Twins selected Blewett's contract, adding him to their active roster. He made one appearance for the Twins, tossing a scoreless inning of relief against the Kansas City Royals. Blewett was designated for assignment following the promotion of Zebby Matthews on August 13. He cleared waivers and was sent outright to St. Paul on August 16. However, Blewett rejected the assignment in favor of free agency. He re-signed with Minnesota on a new minor league contract the following day. On August 23, the Twins added Blewett back to their active roster. In 12 appearances for Minnesota, he compiled a 1.77 ERA with 18 strikeouts across 20 1/3 innings pitched. On November 4, Blewett was removed from the 40–man roster and sent outright to St. Paul. He elected free agency the next day.

On November 18, 2024, Blewett re–signed with the Twins organization on a minor league contract. On April 7, 2025, the Twins selected Blewett's contract, adding him to their active roster. He was designed for assignment on April 12 after allowing one run over 4 2/3 relief innings.

=== Baltimore Orioles ===
On April 14, 2025, the Baltimore Orioles claimed Blewett off waivers. He made two scoreless appearances for Baltimore, striking out six batters over 4 1/3 innings pitched. Blewett was designated for assignment by the Orioles on April 19.

=== Atlanta Braves (second stint) ===
On April 20, 2025, Blewett was traded to the Atlanta Braves in exchange for cash considerations. In 11 appearances (one start) for Atlanta, he logged a 2-0 record and 5.51 ERA with 13 strikeouts across 16 1/3 innings pitched. Blewett was designated for assignment following the promotion of Craig Kimbrel on June 5.

=== Baltimore Orioles (second stint) ===
On June 6, 2025, Blewett was traded to the Baltimore Orioles in exchange for cash considerations. He allowed 16 earned runs with 12 strikeouts in 21 2/3 innings pitched across 11 appearances. On July 13, Blewett was placed on the injured list due to right elbow discomfort. He was transferred to the 60-day injured list on August 26. On September 19, Blewett was activated from the injured list and designated for assignment. He cleared waivers and was sent outright to the Triple-A Norfolk Tides on September 22. Blewett elected free agency on September 29.

=== St. Louis Cardinals ===
On November 24, 2025, Blewett signed a minor league contract with the St. Louis Cardinals. He began the 2026 season with the Triple-A Memphis Redbirds, pitching to a 4–1 record and 5.18 ERA with 63 strikeouts and six saves across 37 appearances. On July 17, 2026, the Cardinals selected Blewett's contract, adding him to their active roster. He made one scoreless appearance for St. Louis, recording two strikeouts in two innings pitched against the Los Angeles Angels on July 21. The following day, Blewett was designated for assignment by the Cardinals.

=== Athletics ===
On July 26, 2026, Blewett was traded to the Athletics in exchange for cash considerations.
