= J. T. Ginn =

American baseball player (born 1999)

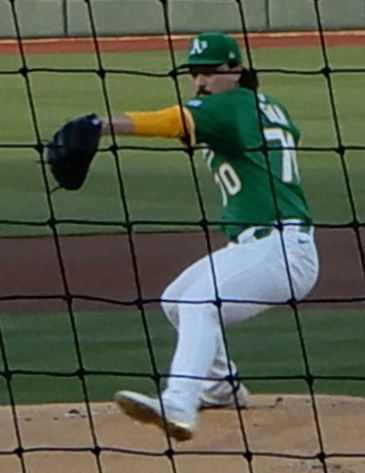
- Ginn with the Athletics in 2025

Athletics – No. 35
- Pitcher
- Born: May 20, 1999 (age 27); Flowood, Mississippi, U.S.
- Bats: Right Throws: Right

MLB debut
- August 21, 2024, for the Oakland Athletics

MLB statistics (through 2026 season)
- Win–loss record: 14–16
- Earned run average: 4.25
- Strikeouts: 249
- Stats at Baseball Reference

Teams
- Oakland Athletics / Athletics (2024–present)
Medals
Men's baseball
Representing United States
U-18 Baseball World Cup
Gold medal – first place	2017 Thunder Bay	Team

John Thomas Ginn (born May 20, 1999) is an American professional baseball pitcher for the Athletics of Major League Baseball (MLB). He made his MLB debut in 2024.

== Amateur career ==
Ginn graduated from Brandon High School in Brandon, Mississippi. In 2017, as a junior, he batted .482 with 16 home runs. That summer, he pitched in the 2017 Under Armour All-America Baseball Game at Wrigley Field. As a senior, he batted .419 with nine home runs and 27 RBI along with pitching to a 5–1 record and 0.36 ERA and was named the Mississippi Gatorade Baseball Player of the Year. He signed to play college baseball at Mississippi State.

The Los Angeles Dodgers selected Ginn with the 30th overall selection of the 2018 MLB draft. On July 5, 2018, he announced that he was going to honor his commitment to Mississippi State and that he would not be signing with the Dodgers. In 2019, his freshman year at Mississippi State, he went 8–4 with a 3.36 ERA over 16 starts, striking out 103 over eighty innings. He was named the 2019 Southeastern Conference Freshman of the Year. He underwent Tommy John surgery in March 2020.

== Professional career ==
=== New York Mets ===
The New York Mets selected Ginn with the 52nd overall pick the 2020 MLB draft. He signed with the Mets on June 30, 2020, for a $2.9 million bonus. He did not play a minor league game in 2020 due to the cancellation of the minor league season caused by the COVID-19 pandemic alongside still recovering from surgery. Ginn returned to play in June 2021, making his professional debut with the St. Lucie Mets of the Low-A Southeast. He was promoted to the Brooklyn Cyclones of the High-A East in July. Over 18 starts between the two teams, Ginn went 5–5 with a 3.03 ERA and 81 strikeouts over 92 innings.

=== Oakland Athletics / Athletics ===
On March 12, 2022, the Mets traded Ginn and Adam Oller to the Oakland Athletics in exchange for Chris Bassitt. He opened the season with the Midland RockHounds of the Double–A Texas League. In 12 starts split between Midland and the rookie–level Arizona Complex League Athletics, Ginn compiled a 1–4 record and 5.10 ERA with 46 strikeouts across 42 1/3 innings pitched. He returned to the two affiliates in 2023, making eight starts and struggling to a 7.43 ERA with 17 strikeouts over 26 2/3 innings of work. Ginn began the 2024 season with Midland, logging a 4–1 record and 4.15 ERA over six starts. In May, he was promoted to the Triple–A Las Vegas Aviators, for whom he logged a 4–3 record and 5.72 ERA with 69 strikeouts across 15 games (14 starts).

On August 20, 2024, Ginn was selected to the 40-man roster and promoted to the major leagues for the first time. He made his MLB debut the next day versus the Tampa Bay Rays and pitched two scoreless innings in relief while recording three strikeouts in a 4-2 loss. Across eight games (six starts) for Oakland during his rookie campaign, Ginn posted a 1–1 record and 4.24 ERA with 29 strikeouts across 34 innings pitched.

Ginn was optioned to Las Vegas to begin the 2025 season. He was recalled by the Athletics in April, but shortly after, was placed on the injured list with right elbow inflammation. He was activated on May 19, but then placed back on the injured list the next day with a right quadriceps strain. Ginn returned to the Athletics on June 16, and played the remainder of the season with the club. For the season, he pitched in 23 games (16 starts) and had a 4–7 record, a 5.08 ERA, and 99 strikeouts across 90 1/3 innings.

Ginn was named to the Athletics' Opening Day roster in 2026 as a relief pitcher. On July 22, he was placed on the injured list with a right middle finger blister before he was activated on August 4. On September 5, he was placed back on the injured list with right elbow impingement. Ginn was transferred to the 60–day injured list on September 22, officially ending his season. Ginn pitched in 27 games (24 starts) for the Athletics and ended the season with a 9–8 record, a 3.71 ERA, and 121 strikeouts across 138 1/3 innings.

== Personal life ==
Ginn was born John Thomas Ginn on May 20, 1999, in Flowood, Mississippi to Wanda and Mike Ginn.
