= Carlos Cortes =

American baseball player (born 1997)

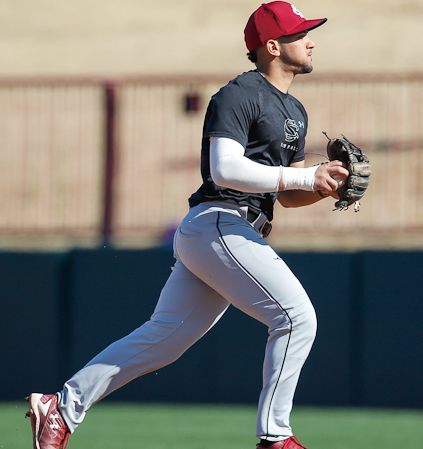
- Cortes in 2017 with South Carolina

Athletics – No. 26
- Outfielder
- Born: June 30, 1997 (age 29); Orlando, Florida, U.S.
- Bats: Left Throws: Switch

MLB debut
- July 23, 2025, for the Athletics

MLB statistics (through September 19, 2026)
- Batting average: .265
- Home runs: 13
- Runs batted in: 54
- Stats at Baseball Reference

Teams
- Athletics (2025–present)

Carlos Andres Cortes (born June 30, 1997) is an American professional baseball outfielder for the Athletics of Major League Baseball (MLB). He made his MLB debut in 2025.

Cortes is one of the few switch throwers in MLB history. He played college baseball for the South Carolina Gamecocks, then was drafted by the New York Mets in the third round of the 2018 MLB draft. He signed with the Athletics after the 2024 season. He played for Puerto Rico in the 2026 World Baseball Classic.

== Amateur career ==
Cortes attended Lake Howell High School. He was drafted by the New York Mets in the 20th round of the 2016 MLB draft but did not sign. He attended the University of South Carolina for two seasons (2017 and 2018) and played college baseball for the Gamecocks. In 2017, he played collegiate summer baseball in the Cape Cod Baseball League for the Yarmouth-Dennis Red Sox.

Cortes hit .265 with 15 home runs and 44 runs batted in (RBI) his sophomore season in 2018 for the Gamecocks and was ranked the 177th best prospect by Baseball America in the upcoming draft.

== Professional career ==
=== New York Mets ===
The New York Mets selected Cortes in the third round, with the 83rd overall selection, of the 2018 Major League Baseball draft; he signed with them for a $1 million signing bonus on June 25.

Cortes made his professional debut for the Low-A Brooklyn Cyclones, hitting to a .264/.338/.382 slash line with four home runs and 24 RBI. He spent the 2019 season with the High-A St. Lucie Mets. Over 127 appearances for St. Lucie, Cortes slashed .255/.336/.397 with 11 home runs, 68 RBI, and 26 doubles. He was named a post-season Florida State League All-Star. He did not play in a game in 2020 due to the cancellation of the minor league season because of the COVID-19 pandemic. He played in the Australian Baseball League for the Sydney Blue Sox that winter, batting .392 in 14 games. Cortes was drafted as a second baseman, but due to a weak right throwing arm, was moved to a lefty-throwing outfielder after two seasons in the minors.

Cortes spent the 2021 season with the Double-A Binghamton Rumble Ponies, batting .257/.332/.487 with 14 home runs and 57 RBI over 79 games. He split the 2022 season between Binghamton and the Triple-A Syracuse Mets. In 123 appearances split between the two affiliates, Cortes slashed .223/.295/.369 with 12 home runs and 55 RBI.

Cortes made 118 appearances for Triple-A Syracuse during the 2023 season, batting .241/.355/.428 with 15 home runs and 54 RBI. He returned to Syracuse in 2024, playing in 83 games and hitting .246/.330/.456 with 16 home runs, 52 RBI, and three stolen bases. Cortes elected free agency following the season on November 4.

=== Athletics ===
On November 18, 2024, Cortes signed a minor league contract with the Athletics. On July 15, 2025, the Athletics added Cortes to their 40-man roster and immediately optioned him back to the Triple-A Las Vegas Aviators. He made his MLB debut on July 23. The following day, in a game against the Houston Astros, in his second career at-bat, Cortes got his first MLB RBI on a sacrifice fly. In the bottom of the third, he threw out a runner at second from far right field. Then in top of the fourth inning, he singled for his first MLB hit. On September 6, Cortes hit his first career home run off of Scott Kingery, a utility player with the Los Angeles Angels. In his first MLB season, he hit .309, the second best average by any rookie with at least 50 plate appearances, trailing teammate Jacob Wilson. After the season, Cortes was named the Aviators' most valuable player and a Pacific Coast League All-Star.

Cortes was named the American League Player of the Week on April 27, 2026 after batting .542 with six extra base hits in six games. He pitched in nine games for the Athletics, throwing exclusively as a lefty.

== International career ==
Cortes played for the Puerto Rico national team in the 2026 World Baseball Classic. He batted .278 with one RBI in five games.

== Personal life ==
Cortes naturally throws left handed, but his father taught him to throw right handed at the age of 8.

Cortes is married. He has an older sister who played college softball for the Tampa Spartans.
