= Henry Bolte (baseball) =

American baseball player (born 2003)

Athletics – No. 33
- Outfielder
- Born: August 4, 2003 (age 23); San Francisco, California, U.S.
- Bats: Right Throws: Right

MLB debut
- May 13, 2026, for the Athletics

MLB statistics (through 2026 season)
- Batting average: .277
- Home runs: 11
- Runs batted in: 38
- Stats at Baseball Reference

Teams
- Athletics (2026–present)

Henry Bolte (/boʊlˈteɪ/ bohl-TAY; born August 4, 2003) is an American professional baseball outfielder for the Athletics of Major League Baseball (MLB). He made his MLB debut in 2026.

== Early life and amateur career ==
Bolte grew up in Palo Alto, California, and attended Palo Alto High School. During the 2021 season, he hit .304 with five doubles, six triples, and three home runs. In the following summer he played in the Area Code Games. As a senior, Bolte batted .441 with 45 hits, 13 home runs, and 42 RBI. Following the end of the season, he participated in the Major League Baseball draft combine. Bolte committed to play college baseball at the University of Texas at Austin for the Texas Longhorns.

== Professional career ==
The Oakland Athletics selected Bolte 56th overall in the 2022 Major League Baseball draft. He signed with the team on July 25, 2022, and received a $2 million signing bonus. After signing, Bolte was assigned to the rookie-level Arizona Complex League Athletics to begin his professional career, with whom he hit .212 over 11 games. In 2023, he played with the Stockton Ports and batted .257 with 14 home runs, 68 RBI, and 32 stolen bases over 112 games.

To open the 2024 season, Bolte was assigned to the Lansing Lugnuts. In July, he was promoted to the Midland Rockhounds. Over 123 games between both teams, Bolte hit .267 with 15 home runs, 73 RBI, and 46 stolen bases. He returned to Midland to open the 2025 season and was promoted to the Las Vegas Aviators of the Triple-A Pacific Coast League (PCL) in July.

Bolte began the 2026 season with Las Vegas and tied a PCL record with hits in 12 consecutive at-bats from May 7-9. This included a two-game stretch where he hit 10-10 with 9 extra base hits. He was named the PCL's player of the week for May 4-10. On May 12, 2026, Bolte was selected to the 40-man roster and promoted to the major leagues for the first time. He made his major league debut the following day against the St. Louis Cardinals, collecting singles in his first two at-bats. On June 9, Bolte hit his first career home run off of Robert Gasser of the Milwaukee Brewers.
