= 2024 Oakland Athletics season =

2024 Oakland Athletics
- League: American League
- Division: West
- Ballpark: Oakland Coliseum
- City: Oakland, California
- Record: 69–93 (.426)
- Divisional place: 4th
- Owners: John Fisher
- General managers: David Forst
- Managers: Mark Kotsay
- Television: NBC Sports California (Jenny Cavnar, Chris Caray, Johnny Doskow, Dallas Braden)
- Radio: KNEW; Oakland Athletics Radio Network (Ken Korach, Vince Cotroneo, Johnny Doskow)

The 2024 season was the 124th season for the Oakland Athletics franchise, and the 57th in Oakland. It was the Athletics' final season in Oakland, before the team relocated after the owners approved the move unanimously on November 16, 2023. The team took temporary residency in West Sacramento for three seasons at Sutter Health Park, operating as just the Athletics during that period of time.

This was the first season for Jenny Cavnar as play-by-play announcer for A's broadcasts on NBC Sports California, thus becoming the first female primary announcer in MLB history.

With a win over the New York Mets on August 13, the Athletics improved on their record from the previous season.

== Transactions ==
=== October 2023 ===
October 2	Activated RHP's Angel Felipe and Austin Pruitt from the 15-day injured list. Recalled RHP's Devin Sweet, Tayler Scott and Chad Smith; LHP's Kirby Snead, Sam Long, Hogan Harris and Easton Lucas; SS Kevin Smith and 3B's Buddy Kennedy and Jonah Bride from Las Vegas Aviators.
October 4	Activated LHP Richard Lovelady and RHP Yacksel Ríos from the 60-day injured list and outrighted them to Las Vegas Aviators. Sent RHP Zach Neal outright to Las Vegas Aviators.
October 9	RHP Austin Pruitt elected free agency.
October 12	Activated RHP James Kaprielian from the 60-day injured list and sent him outright to Las Vegas Aviators. Sent LHP Sam Long and C Carlos Pérez outright to Las Vegas Aviators.
October 17	Activated RHP's Drew Rucinski, Freddy Tarnok and Zach Jackson from the 60-day injured list.
October 24	Claimed LHP Anthony Kay off waivers from New York Mets.
October 25	St. Louis Cardinals claimed 3B Buddy Kennedy off of waivers.
October 27	Sent LHP Kirby Snead outright to Las Vegas Aviators.

=== November 2023 ===
November 2	RHP Trevor May elected free agency.
November 6	Claimed 3B Miguel Andújar off of waivers from Pittsburgh Pirates. Selected the contract of LF Lázaro Armenteros from Midland RockHounds. Sent RHP's Tayler Scott and Chad Smith; and LHP's Easton Lucas and Anthony Kay outright to Las Vegas Aviators. Activated LHP Sean Newcomb from the 60-day injured list.
November 14	Selected the contract of SS Darell Hernáiz from Las Vegas Aviators. Selected the contracts of LHP Brady Basso and RHP Royber Salinas from Midland RockHounds.
November 15	Acquired 3B Abraham Toro from the Milwaukee Brewers for RHP Chad Patrick.
November 16	Signed free agent LHP Jack O'Loughlin from the Detroit Tigers to a minor league contract.
November 17	Claimed RHP Michael Kelly off waivers from Cleveland Guardians. SS Kevin Smith elected free agency – (signed a minor league contract with New York Yankees on January 8). Signed free agent CF Daz Cameron from the Baltimore Orioles to a minor league contract and invited him to spring training.
November 20	Signed free agent RHP Osvaldo Bido from the Pittsburgh Pirates to a one-year, $750,000 contract. Signed free agent SS Hoy Park from the Atlanta Braves to a minor league contract.
November 21	Signed free agent OF Jeisson Rosario from the New York Yankees to a minor league contract.
November 22	Signed free agent LHP Domingo Robles from the Atlanta Braves to a minor league contract.
November 29	Signed free agent C Drew Lugbauer from the Atlanta Braves to a minor league contract and invited him to spring training.
November 30	Invited non-roster 2B Cooper Bowman to spring training. Invited non-roster RHP Jack Perkins to spring training. Invited non-roster SS Max Muncy to spring training. Invited non-roster RHP Stevie Emanuels to spring training. Invited non-roster C Daniel Susac to spring training. Invited non-roster C Kyle McCann to spring training. Invited non-roster SS Jacob Wilson to spring training. Invited non-roster RHP Billy Sullivan to spring training. Invited non-roster 3B Brett Harris to spring training. Invited non-roster 2B Max Schuemann to spring training. Invited non-roster RHP Shohei Tomioka to spring training.

=== December 2023 ===
December 4	Signed free agent RHP Danis Correa from the Cincinnati Reds to a minor league contract.
December 6	Drafted RHP Mitch Spence from the New York Yankees in the 2023 Rule 5 draft.
December 9	Signed free agent RHP Michel Otanez from the Arizona Diamondbacks to a minor league contract.
December 10	Signed free agent RHP Gerardo Reyes from the Los Angeles Angels to a minor league contract.
December 12	Signed free agent RHP Gerson Moreno from the Washington Nationals to a minor league contract.
December 15	Activated SS Aledmys Díaz.
December 18	San Francisco Giants claimed RHP Devin Sweet off waivers.
December 19	Signed free agent RHP Trevor Gott from the New York Mets to a one-year, $1.5 million contract.

=== January 2024 ===
January 5	Re-signed free agent C Carlos Pérez to a minor league contract.
January 15	Signed international free agent SS Edgar Montero to a minor league contract. Signed international free agent RHP Hugo Meraz from Mexico to a minor league contract. Signed international free agent SS Brayan Cota from Mexico to a minor league contract. Signed international free agent RHP Yohandri Contreras from Venezuela to a minor league contract. Signed international free agent RHP Celso Lopez from Venezuela to a minor league contract. Signed international free agent RHP Oliver Sirotti from Dominican Republic to a minor league contract. Signed international free agent RHP Erick Matos from Cuba to a minor league contract. Signed international free agent OF Sebastian Rojas from Venezuela to a minor league contract. Signed international free agent SS Samuel Gonzalez from Venezuela to a minor league contract. Signed international free agent C Alejandro Pereira from Venezuela to a minor league contract. Signed international free agent RHP Nathan Arends from Aruba to a minor league contract. Signed international free agent LHP Franco Zabelta from Colombia to a minor league contract. Signed international free agent RHP Luis Plicet from Panama to a minor league contract. Signed international free agent OF José Ramos from Venezuela to a minor league contract. Signed international free agent LHP José Parra from Venezuela to a minor league contract. Signed international free agent C Azaeel Pacheco from Venezuela to a minor league contract.
January 31	Signed free agent RHP Dylan Hall from New York Mets to a minor league contract.

=== February 2024 ===
February 1	Sent LHP Francisco Pérez outright to Las Vegas Aviators.
February 2	Signed free agent LHP Alex Wood from San Francisco Giants to a one-year, $8.5 million contract. Traded OF Jonah Cox to San Francisco Giants for RHP Ross Stripling and cash. Designated 3B Jonah Bride for assignment.
February 3	Signed free agent RF Stephen Piscotty from Chicago White Sox to a minor league contract.
February 5	Activated RHP Mason Miller.
February 7	Traded 3B Jonah Bride to Miami Marlins for cash.
February 8	Re-signed free agent LHP Francisco Pérez to a minor league contract.
February 9	Signed free agent RHP Aaron Brooks from San Diego Padres to a minor league contract.
February 14	Signed free agent LHP Scott Alexander from San Francisco Giants to a one-year, $2.25 million contract.
February 21	Signed international free agent RHP Amilcar Medina from Venezuela to a minor league contract.

=== March 2024 ===
March 3	Optioned RHP Adrián Martínez to Las Vegas Aviators. Optioned RHP Osvaldo Bido to Las Vegas Aviators. Optioned LHP Hogan Harris to Las Vegas Aviators.
March 10	Optioned 3B Jordan Díaz to Las Vegas Aviators. Optioned LHP Brady Basso to Las Vegas Aviators. Optioned LF Lazaro Armenteros to Las Vegas Aviators. Optioned RHP Royber Salinas to Las Vegas Aviators. Optioned RHP Joey Estes to Las Vegas Aviators.
March 16	Signed free agent 3B J. D. Davis from San Francisco Giants to a one-year, $2.5 million contract. Designated RHP Ángel Felipe for assignment.
March 17	Optioned C Tyler Soderstrom to Las Vegas Aviators.
March 19	Released RHP Ángel Felipe.
March 24	Acquired RHP Austin Adams from New York Mets for cash.
March 26	Acquired LHP T.J. McFarland from Los Angeles Dodgers for cash.
March 27	Optioned RHP Zach Jackson to Las Vegas Aviators.

== Season standings ==
=== American League West ===
AL West
Team	W	L	Pct.	GB	Home	Road
Houston Astros	88	73	.547	—	46‍–‍35	42‍–‍38
Seattle Mariners	85	77	.525	3½	49‍–‍32	36‍–‍45
Texas Rangers	78	84	.481	10½	44‍–‍37	34‍–‍47
Oakland Athletics	69	93	.426	19½	38‍–‍43	31‍–‍50
Los Angeles Angels	63	99	.389	25½	32‍–‍49	31‍–‍50

=== American League Wild Card ===
Division leaders
Team	W	L	Pct.
New York Yankees	94	68	.580
Cleveland Guardians	92	69	.571
Houston Astros	88	73	.547

Wild Card teams (Top 3 teams qualify for postseason)
Team	W	L	Pct.	GB
Baltimore Orioles	91	71	.562	+5
Kansas City Royals	86	76	.531	—
Detroit Tigers	86	76	.531	—
Seattle Mariners	85	77	.525	1
Minnesota Twins	82	80	.506	4
Boston Red Sox	81	81	.500	5
Tampa Bay Rays	80	82	.494	6
Texas Rangers	78	84	.481	8
Toronto Blue Jays	74	88	.457	12
Oakland Athletics	69	93	.426	17
Los Angeles Angels	63	99	.389	23
Chicago White Sox	41	121	.253	45

=== Record vs. opponents ===
==== Record vs. American League ====
2024 American League record Source: MLB Standings Grid – 2024
Team	BAL	BOS	CWS	CLE	DET	HOU	KC	LAA	MIN	NYY	OAK	SEA	TB	TEX	TOR	NL
Baltimore	—	8–5	6–1	3–4	2–4	2–5	4–2	4–2	6–0	8–5	3–3	4–2	9–4	5–2	7–6	20–26
Boston	5–8	—	4–3	2–5	3–4	2–4	4–2	4–2	3–3	6–7	5–1	4–3	6–7	4–2	8–5	21–25
Chicago	1–6	3–4	—	5–8	3–10	2–4	1–12	4–2	1–12	1–5	3–3	1–6	4–2	0–7	1–5	11–35
Cleveland	4–3	5–2	8–5	—	7–6	1–4	5–8	5–1	10–3	2–4	6–1	4–2	3–4	4–2	4–2	24–22
Detroit	4–2	4–3	10–3	6–7	—	2–4	6–7	3–4	6–7	2–4	3–3	5–1	5–1	3–4	5–2	22–24
Houston	5–2	4–2	4–2	4–1	4–2	—	4–3	9–4	2–4	1–6	8–5	5–8	4–2	7–6	5–2	22–24
Kansas City	2–4	2–4	12–1	8–5	7–6	3–4	—	5–2	6–7	2–5	4–2	3–3	3–3	1–5	5–2	23–23
Los Angeles	2–4	2–4	2–4	1–5	4–3	4–9	2–5	—	1–5	3–3	5–8	8–5	3–4	4–9	0–7	22–24
Minnesota	0–6	3–3	12–1	3–10	7–6	4–2	7–6	5–1	—	0–6	6–1	5–2	3–4	5–2	4–2	18–28
New York	5–8	7–6	5–1	4–2	4–2	6–1	5–2	3–3	6–0	—	5–2	4–3	7–6	3–3	7–6	23–23
Oakland	3–3	1–5	3–3	1–6	3–3	5–8	2–4	8–5	1–6	2–5	—	4–9	3–4	6–7	3–3	24–22
Seattle	2–4	3–4	6–1	2–4	1–5	8–5	3–3	5–8	2–5	3–4	9–4	—	3–3	10–3	2–4	26–20
Tampa Bay	4–9	7–6	2–4	4–3	1–5	2–4	3–3	4–3	4–3	6–7	4–3	3–3	—	1–5	9–4	26–20
Texas	2–5	2–4	7–0	2–4	4–3	6–7	5–1	9–4	2–5	3–3	7–6	3–10	5–1	—	2–4	19–27
Toronto	6–7	5–8	5–1	2–4	2–5	2–5	2–5	7–0	2–4	6–7	3–3	4–2	4–9	4–2	—	20–26

Updated with the results of all games through September 30, 2024.

==== Record vs. National League ====
2024 American League record vs. National League Source: MLB Standings
Team	AZ	ATL	CHC	CIN	COL	LAD	MIA	MIL	NYM	PHI	PIT	SD	SF	STL	WSH
Baltimore	2–1	2–1	0–3	3–0	2–1	1–2	1–2	1–2	1–2	2–1	1–2	1–2	1–2	0–3	2–2
Boston	0–3	1–3	2–1	2–1	1–2	0–3	3–0	1–2	0–3	2–1	3–0	1–2	2–1	1–2	2–1
Chicago	1–2	2–1	0–4	0–3	2–1	0–3	1–2	0–3	0–3	0–3	0–3	0–3	1–2	2–1	2–1
Cleveland	0–3	1–2	3–0	3–1	1–2	1–2	2–1	0–3	3–0	2–1	2–1	1–2	2–1	1–2	2–1
Detroit	2–1	0–3	1–2	3–0	2–1	2–1	1–2	1–2	2–1	1–2	2–2	1–2	1–2	2–1	1–2
Houston	2–1	0–3	0–3	0–3	4–0	2–1	3–0	2–1	2–1	1–2	1–2	1–2	1–2	2–1	1–2
Kansas City	1–2	1–2	1–2	3–0	1–2	1–2	2–1	2–1	1–2	1–2	2–1	1–2	0–3	3–1	3–0
Los Angeles	1–2	1–2	1–2	0–3	1–2	2–2	3–0	1–2	2–1	1–2	2–1	3–0	2–1	1–2	1–2
Minnesota	2–1	0–3	1–2	1–2	2–1	1–2	1–2	1–3	1–2	2–1	1–2	1–2	1–2	1–2	2–1
New York	2–1	1–2	2–1	0–3	2–1	1–2	2–1	2–1	0–4	3–0	1–2	2–1	3–0	1–2	1–2
Oakland	1–2	1–2	2–1	2–1	2–1	1–2	2–1	1–2	2–1	2–1	3–0	0–3	2–2	1–2	2–1
Seattle	2–1	2–1	1–2	3–0	2–1	0–3	1–2	1–2	3–0	2–1	1–2	3–1	2–1	2–1	1–2
Tampa Bay	3–0	1–2	2–1	2–1	2–1	1–2	3–1	1–2	3–0	0–3	2–1	1–2	2–1	1–2	2–1
Texas	2–2	1–2	2–1	2–1	0–3	2–1	2–1	0–3	1–2	0–3	2–1	1–2	1–2	1–2	2–1
Toronto	1–2	1–2	1–2	1–2	2–1	1–2	0–3	1–2	1–2	1–3	2–1	2–1	2–1	3–0	1–2

Updated with the results of all games through September 30, 2024.

== Game log ==
Legend
Athletics Win	Athletics Loss	Game postponed / Tie	Eliminated from playoff race

2024 Game Log
Total: 69–93 (Home: 38–43; Away: 31–50)
March/April: 14–17 (Home: 6–9; Away: 8–8)

#	Date	Opponent	Score	Win	Loss	Save	Stadium (Attendance)	Record	Streak
1	March 28	Guardians	0–8	Bieber (1–0)	Wood (0–1)	—	Oakland Coliseum (13,522)	0–1	L1
2	March 29	Guardians	4–6	Allen (1–0)	Stripling (0–1)	Clase (1)	Oakland Coliseum (3,837)	0–2	L2
3	March 30	Guardians	3–12	Sandlin (1–0)	Sears (0–1)	—	Oakland Coliseum (5,425)	0–3	L3
4	March 31	Guardians	4–3	Jiménez (1–0)	Barlow (0–1)	—	Oakland Coliseum (4,118)	1–3	W1
5	April 1	Red Sox	0–9	Houck (1–0)	Boyle (0–1)	Anderson (1)	Oakland Coliseum (6,618)	1–4	L1
6	April 2	Red Sox	4–5 (11)	Winckowski (1–0)	Spence (0–1)	—	Oakland Coliseum (5,112)	1–5	L2
7	April 3	Red Sox	0–1	Pivetta (1–1)	Stripling (0–2)	Jansen (2)	Oakland Coliseum (6,436)	1–6	L3
8	April 5	@ Tigers	4–5	Foley (2–0)	Erceg (0–1)	Lange (1)	Comerica Park (44,711)	1–7	L4
9	April 6	@ Tigers	4–0	Blackburn (1–0)	Maeda (0–1)	—	Comerica Park (27,529)	2–7	W1
10	April 7	@ Tigers	7–1	Boyle (1–1)	Flaherty (0–1)	—	Comerica Park (15,174)	3–7	W2
11	April 9	@ Rangers	4–3	Kelly (1–0)	Leclerc (0–2)	Miller (1)	Globe Life Field (18,714)	4–7	W3
12	April 10	@ Rangers	2–6	Bradford (3–0)	Stripling (0–3)	—	Globe Life Field (30,488)	4–8	L1
13	April 11	@ Rangers	1–0	Sears (1–1)	Gray (0–1)	Miller (2)	Globe Life Field (19,726)	5–8	W1
14	April 12	Nationals	2–1 (10)	Kelly (2–0)	Finnegan (0–2)	—	Oakland Coliseum (5,777)	6–8	W2
15	April 13	Nationals	1–3	Gore (2–0)	Boyle (1–2)	Finnegan (5)	Oakland Coliseum (3,330)	6–9	L1
16	April 14	Nationals	7–6	Spence (1–1)	Law (1–1)	Miller (3)	Oakland Coliseum (8,637)	7–9	W1
17	April 15	Cardinals	1–3	Gray (2–0)	Stripling (0–4)	Helsley (6)	Oakland Coliseum (5,508)	7–10	L1
18	April 16	Cardinals	2–3	Lynn (1–0)	Jiménez (1–1)	Helsley (7)	Oakland Coliseum (3,296)	7–11	L2
19	April 17	Cardinals	6–3	Blackburn (2–0)	Matz (1–1)	Miller (4)	Oakland Coliseum (9,551)	8–11	W1
20	April 19	@ Guardians	2–10	McKenzie (2–2)	Boyle (1–3)	—	Progressive Field (16,262)	8–12	L1
21	April 20	@ Guardians	3–6	Allen (3–0)	Wood (0–2)	Clase (6)	Progressive Field (19,487)	8–13	L2
22	April 21	@ Guardians	2–6	Bibee (2–0)	Stripling (0–5)	—	Progressive Field (16,905)	8–14	L3
23	April 22	@ Yankees	2–0	Erceg (1–1)	González (1–1)	Miller (5)	Yankee Stadium (30,366)	9–14	W1
24	April 23	@ Yankees	3–4	Stroman (2–1)	Blackburn (2–1)	Holmes (9)	Yankee Stadium (30,060)	9–15	L1
25	April 24	@ Yankees	3–7	Schmidt (2–0)	Boyle (1–4)	—	Yankee Stadium (31,179)	9–16	L2
26	April 25	@ Yankees	3–1	Wood (1–2)	Cortés Jr. (1–2)	Miller (6)	Yankee Stadium (40,141)	10–16	W1
27	April 26	@ Orioles	3–2 (10)	Spence (2–1)	Webb (0–1)	Miller (7)	Camden Yards (22,965)	11–16	W2
28	April 27	@ Orioles	0–7	Irvin (2–1)	Sears (1–2)	—	Camden Yards (28,364)	11–17	L1
29	April 28	@ Orioles	7–6	McFarland (1–0)	Kimbrel (3–1)	Erceg (1)	Camden Yards (40,887)	12–17	W1
30	April 29	Pirates	5–1	Boyle (2–4)	Falter (2–2)	—	Oakland Coliseum (3,528)	13–17	W2
31	April 30	Pirates	5–2	Spence (3–1)	Keller (2–3)	Miller (8)	Oakland Coliseum (3,876)	14–17	W3

May: 9–19 (Home: 7–7; Away: 2–12)

#	Date	Opponent	Score	Win	Loss	Save	Stadium (Attendance)	Record	Streak
32	May 1	Pirates	4–0	Stripling (1–5)	Priester (0–2)	—	Oakland Coliseum (4,679)	15–17	W4
33	May 3	Marlins	3–1	Sears (2–2)	Weathers (2–3)	Erceg (2)	Oakland Coliseum (8,533)	16–17	W5
34	May 4	Marlins	20–4	Blackburn (3–1)	Rogers (0–5)	—	Oakland Coliseum (7,809)	17–17	W6
35	May 5	Marlins	3–12	Smith (2–0)	Boyle (2–5)	—	Oakland Coliseum (12,212)	17–18	L1
36	May 6	Rangers	2–4	Leclerc (3–2)	Erceg (1–2)	Yates (6)	Oakland Coliseum (2,895)	17–19	L2
37	May 7	Rangers	8–15	Ureña (1–2)	Stripling (1–6)	—	Oakland Coliseum (3,965)	17–20	L3
38	May 8 (1)	Rangers	9–4	Sears (3–2)	Lorenzen (2–2)	—	Oakland Coliseum (see 2nd game)	18–20	W1
39	May 8 (2)	Rangers	11–12	Robertson (2–0)	Bido (0–1)	Yates (7)	Oakland Coliseum (8,230)	18–21	L1
40	May 10	@ Mariners	1–8	Thornton (1–1)	Blackburn (3–2)	—	T-Mobile Park (39,743)	18–22	L2
41	May 11	@ Mariners	8–1	Estes (1–0)	Miller (3–3)	—	T-Mobile Park (32,398)	19–22	W1
42	May 12	@ Mariners	4–8	Castillo (4–5)	Wood (1–3)	—	T-Mobile Park (41,609)	19–23	L1
43	May 13	@ Astros	2–9	Arrighetti (1–4)	Stripling (1–7)	—	Minute Maid Park (26,225)	19–24	L2
44	May 14	@ Astros	1–2 (10)	Hader (2–3)	Kelly (2–1)	—	Minute Maid Park (36,178)	19–25	L3
45	May 15	@ Astros	0–3	Valdez (3–1)	Brooks (0–1)	Martinez (1)	Minute Maid Park (28,124)	19–26	L4
46	May 16	@ Astros	1–8	Javier (3–1)	Estes (1–1)	Dubin (1)	Minute Maid Park (26,377)	19–27	L5
47	May 17	@ Royals	2–6	Ragans (3–3)	Spence (3–2)	—	Kauffman Stadium (24,585)	19–28	L6
48	May 18	@ Royals	3–5	Lugo (7–1)	Stripling (1–8)	McArthur (11)	Kauffman Stadium (22,014)	19–29	L7
49	May 19	@ Royals	4–8	Singer (4–2)	Sears (3–3)	—	Kauffman Stadium (20,035)	19–30	L8
50	May 21	Rockies	5–4	Erceg (4–4)	Kinley (2–1)	Miller (9)	Oakland Coliseum (4,005)	20–30	W1
51	May 22	Rockies	3–4 (12)	Mears (1–3)	Muller (0–1)	Koch (1)	Oakland Coliseum (3,617)	20–31	L1
52	May 23	Rockies	10–9 (11)	Bielak (1–0)	Lambert (2–3)	—	Oakland Coliseum (6,886)	21–31	W1
53	May 24	Astros	3–6	Verlander (3–2)	Stripling (1–9)	Hader (7)	Oakland Coliseum (9,676)	21–32	L1
54	May 25	Astros	3–1	Sears (4–3)	Arrighetti (2–5)	Miller (10)	Oakland Coliseum (10,617)	22–32	W1
55	May 26	Astros	2–5	Blanco (5–0)	Brooks (0–2)	—	Oakland Coliseum (10,927)	22–33	L1
56	May 28	@ Rays	3–0	Spence (4–2)	Littell (2–3)	Miller (11)	Tropicana Field (13,889)	23–33	W1
57	May 29	@ Rays	3–4	Fairbanks (1–2)	Kelly (2–2)	—	Tropicana Field (13,167)	23–34	L1
58	May 30	@ Rays	5–6 (12)	Lovelady (1–3)	Ferguson (0–1)	—	Tropicana Field (15,264)	23–35	L2
59	May 31	@ Braves	2–4	López (3–2)	Sears (4–4)	Iglesias (14)	Truist Park (40,204)	23–36	L1

June: 7–20 (Home: 5–7; Away: 2–13)

#	Date	Opponent	Score	Win	Loss	Save	Stadium (Attendance)	Record	Streak
60	June 1	@ Braves	11–9	Kelly (3–2)	Herget (0–1)	Jiménez (1)	Truist Park (41,181)	24–36	W1
61	June 2	@ Braves	1–3	Lee (2–1)	Adams (0–1)	Iglesias (15)	Truist Park (37,853)	24–37	L1
62	June 4	Mariners	3–4	Kirby (5–5)	Spence (4–3)	Saucedo (2)	Oakland Coliseum (5,624)	24–38	L2
63	June 5	Mariners	2–1	Estes (2–1)	Gilbert (3–4)	Miller (12)	Oakland Coliseum (9,735)	25–38	W1
64	June 6	Mariners	0–3	Woo (3–0)	Sears (4–5)	Stanek (4)	Oakland Coliseum (6,571)	25–39	L1
65	June 7	Blue Jays	2–1	Miller (1–0)	Green (1–1)	—	Oakland Coliseum (16,046)	26–39	W1
66	June 8	Blue Jays	0–7	Gausman (5–4)	Medina (0–1)	—	Oakland Coliseum (9,285)	26–40	L1
67	June 9	Blue Jays	4–6 (10)	García (3–0)	Adams (0–2)	Cabrera (1)	Oakland Coliseum (11,276)	26–41	L2
68	June 10	@ Padres	1–6	Cease (6–5)	Estes (2–2)	—	Petco Park (38,822)	26–42	L3
69	June 11	@ Padres	3–4	Suárez (3–0)	Alexander (0–1)	—	Petco Park (41,945)	26–43	L4
70	June 12	@ Padres	4–5	Suárez (4–0)	Miller (1–1)	—	Petco Park (35,688)	26–44	L5
71	June 13	@ Twins	2–6	Ryan (5–5)	Medina (0–2)	—	Target Field (23,229)	26–45	L6
72	June 14	@ Twins	5–6 (10)	Durán (2–2)	Alexander (0–2)	—	Target Field (35,631)	26–46	L7
—	June 15	@ Twins	Postponed (rain); Makeup: June 16						
73	June 16 (1)	@ Twins	2–6	Ober (6–4)	Sears (4–6)	Durán (11)	Target Field (33,835)	26–47	L8
74	June 16 (2)	@ Twins	7–8	Staumont (1–0)	Jiménez (1–2)	Jax (6)	Target Field (20,787)	26–48	L9
75	June 18	Royals	7–5	Harris (1–0)	Marsh (5–4)	Miller (13)	Oakland Coliseum (7,013)	27–48	W1
76	June 19	Royals	5–1	Medina (1–2)	Ragans (4–5)	—	Oakland Coliseum (4,557)	28–48	W2
77	June 20	Royals	2–3	McArthur (4–3)	Nittoli (0–1)	Stratton (4)	Oakland Coliseum (8,753)	28–49	L1
78	June 21	Twins	6–5	Newcomb (1–0)	Durán (3–3)	Miller (14)	Oakland Coliseum (9,158)	29–49	W1
79	June 22	Twins	2–10	Ober (7–4)	Sears (4–7)	—	Oakland Coliseum (9,299)	29–50	L1
80	June 23	Twins	0–3	López (7–6)	Harris (1–1)	Jax (7)	Oakland Coliseum (18,491)	29–51	L2
81	June 24	@ Angels	1–5	Canning (3–8)	Medina (1–3)	—	Angel Stadium (24,586)	29–52	L3
82	June 25	@ Angels	5–7	Anderson (7–7)	Spence (4–4)	Estévez (15)	Angel Stadium (26,473)	29–53	L4
83	June 26	@ Angels	2–5	Moore (4–2)	Estes (2–3)	—	Angel Stadium (31,240)	29–54	L5
84	June 28	@ Diamondbacks	9–4	Alexander (1–2)	Thompson (3–3)	—	Chase Field (25,846)	30–54	W1
85	June 29	@ Diamondbacks	0–3	Gallen (6–4)	Harris (1–2)	Sewald (11)	Chase Field (39,843)	30–55	L1
86	June 30	@ Diamondbacks	1–5	Mantiply (3–1)	McFarland (1–1)	—	Chase Field (26,413)	30–56	L2

July: 15–9 (Home: 8–4; Away: 7–5)

#	Date	Opponent	Score	Win	Loss	Save	Stadium (Attendance)	Record	Streak
87	July 2	Angels	7–5	Spence (5–4)	Soriano (4–6)	—	Oakland Coliseum (5,447)	31–56	W1
88	July 3	Angels	5–0	Estes (3–3)	Daniel (1–1)	—	Oakland Coliseum (14,837)	32–56	W2
89	July 4	Angels	5–0	Sears (5–7)	Contreras (1–1)	—	Oakland Coliseum (11,956)	33–56	W3
90	July 5	Orioles	2–3	Suárez (5–2)	Harris (1–3)	Kimbrel (22)	Oakland Coliseum (9,654)	33–57	L1
91	July 6	Orioles	19–8	Medina (2–3)	Povich (1–3)	—	Oakland Coliseum (8,526)	34–57	W1
92	July 7	Orioles	3–6	Rodriguez (11–3)	Spence (5–5)	Kimbrel (23)	Oakland Coliseum (14,524)	34–58	L1
93	July 9	@ Red Sox	9–12	Bello (9–5)	Estes (3–4)	—	Fenway Park (31,826)	34–59	L2
94	July 10	@ Red Sox	5–2	Sears (6–7)	Pivetta (4–6)	Miller (15)	Fenway Park (32,935)	35–59	W1
95	July 11	@ Red Sox	0–7	Houck (8–6)	Medina (2–4)	Anderson (3)	Fenway Park (33,512)	35–60	L1
96	July 12	@ Phillies	6–2	Bido (1–1)	Suárez (10–4)	—	Citizens Bank Park (42,570)	36–60	W1
97	July 13	@ Phillies	5–11	Phillips (1–0)	Spence (5–6)	—	Citizens Bank Park (44,231)	36–61	L1
98	July 14	@ Phillies	18–3	Estes (4–4)	Mercado (1–2)	—	Citizens Bank Park (43,025)	37–61	W1
–	July 16	94th All-Star Game in Arlington, TX							
99	July 19	Angels	13–3	Sears (7–7)	Canning (3–10)	—	Oakland Coliseum (11,596)	38–61	W2
100	July 20	Angels	8–2	Spence (6–6)	Kochanowicz (0–2)	—	Oakland Coliseum (14,574)	39–61	W3
101	July 21	Angels	5–8	García (4–1)	Erceg (2–3)	Estévez (18)	Oakland Coliseum (10,380)	39–62	L1
102	July 22	Astros	4–0	Harris (2–3)	Arrighetti (4–8)	—	Oakland Coliseum (4,517)	40–62	W1
103	July 23	Astros	8–2	Bido (2–1)	Bloss (0–1)	—	Oakland Coliseum (5,896)	41–62	W2
104	July 24	Astros	1–8	Brown (9–6)	Sears (7–8)	—	Oakland Coliseum (14,978)	41–63	L1
105	July 25	@ Angels	6–5	Stripling (2–9)	Rosenberg (0–1)	Ferguson (1)	Angel Stadium (25,752)	42–63	W1
106	July 26	@ Angels	5–4	Blackburn (4–2)	Crouse (4–1)	Erceg (3)	Angel Stadium (28,722)	43–63	W2
107	July 27	@ Angels	3–1	Spence (7–6)	Anderson (8–9)	Ferguson (2)	Angel Stadium (33,755)	44–63	W3
108	July 28	@ Angels	6–8	Contreras (2–1)	Bido (2–2)	García (4)	Angel Stadium (27,016)	44–64	L1
109	July 30	@ Giants	5–2	Sears (8–8)	Ray (1–1)	—	Oracle Park (37,885)	45–64	W1
110	July 31	@ Giants	0–1	Webb (8–8)	Stripling (2–10)	—	Oracle Park (38,668)	45–65	L1

August: 14–12 (Home: 7–8; Away: 7–4)

#	Date	Opponent	Score	Win	Loss	Save	Stadium (Attendance)	Record	Streak
111	August 2	Dodgers	6–5	Estes (5–4)	Stone (9–5)	—	Oakland Coliseum (21,060)	46–65	W1
112	August 3	Dodgers	0–10	Flaherty (8–5)	Spence (7–7)	—	Oakland Coliseum (35,207)	46–66	L1
113	August 4	Dodgers	2–3	Vesia (2–3)	Bido (2–3)	Banda (1)	Oakland Coliseum (25,544)	46–67	L2
114	August 5	White Sox	5–1	Sears (9–8)	Bush (0–1)	—	Oakland Coliseum (4,971)	47–67	W1
115	August 6	White Sox	1–5	Cannon (2–5)	Stripling (2–11)	—	Oakland Coliseum (5,867)	47–68	L1
116	August 7	White Sox	3–2	McFarland (2–1)	Toussaint (0–2)	Miller (16)	Oakland Coliseum (6,964)	48–68	W1
117	August 9	@ Blue Jays	1–3	Berríos (10–9)	Spence (7–8)	Green (11)	Rogers Centre (39,894)	48–69	L1
118	August 10	@ Blue Jays	1–0	Bido (3–3)	Rodríguez (1–5)	Miller (17)	Rogers Centre (34,312)	49–69	W1
119	August 11	@ Blue Jays	8–4	Sears (10–8)	Bassitt (9–11)	—	Rogers Centre (38,797)	50–69	W2
120	August 13	@ Mets	9–4	Adams (1–2)	Blackburn (5–3)	—	Citi Field (31,293)	51–69	W3
121	August 14	@ Mets	1–9	Peterson (7–1)	Estes (5–5)	—	Citi Field (28,288)	51–70	L1
122	August 15	@ Mets	7–6	Ferguson (1–1)	Garrett (7–4)	Miller (18)	Citi Field (28,461)	52–70	W1
123	August 17	Giants	2–0	Bido (4–3)	Birdsong (3–3)	Otañez (1)	Oakland Coliseum (37,551)	53–70	W2
124	August 18	Giants	2–4 (10)	Walker (8–3)	Jiménez (1–3)	—	Oakland Coliseum (32,727)	53–71	L1
125	August 19	Rays	3–0	Boyle (3–5)	Bradley (6–8)	Miller (19)	Oakland Coliseum (3,938)	54–71	W1
126	August 20	Rays	0–1	Baz (1–2)	Estes (5–6)	Uceta (1)	Oakland Coliseum (4,377)	54–72	L1
127	August 21	Rays	2–4	Pepiot (7–5)	Spence (7–9)	Rodríguez (1)	Oakland Coliseum (10,339)	54–73	L2
128	August 22	Rays	3–1	Bido (5–3)	Springs (1–2)	Miller (20)	Oakland Coliseum (5,142)	55–73	W1
129	August 23	Brewers	3–11	Hudson (6–1)	Sears (10–9)	—	Oakland Coliseum (14,031)	55–74	L1
130	August 24	Brewers	5–9	Rea (12–4)	Boyle (3–6)	—	Oakland Coliseum (12,769)	55–75	L2
131	August 25	Brewers	4–3	Estes (6–6)	Montas (6–9)	Miller (21)	Oakland Coliseum (15,961)	56–75	W1
132	August 27	@ Reds	5–4	Otañez (1–0)	Santillan (1–2)	Miller (22)	Great American Ball Park (15,786)	57–75	W2
133	August 28	@ Reds	9–6	Ferguson (2–1)	Pagán (3–4)	Miller (23)	Great American Ball Park (12,065)	58–75	W3
134	August 29	@ Reds	9–10	Pagán (4–4)	Holman (0–1)	—	Great American Ball Park (36,098)	58–76	L1
135	August 30	@ Rangers	9–2	Sears (11–9)	Gray (5–6)	—	Globe Life Field (28,111)	59–76	W1
136	August 31	@ Rangers	2–3	Yates (6–2)	Ferguson (2–2)	—	Globe Life Field (28,454)	59–77	L1

September: 10–16 (Home: 5–8; Away: 5–8)

#	Date	Opponent	Score	Win	Loss	Save	Stadium (Attendance)	Record	Streak
137	September 1	@ Rangers	4–6 (10)	Festa (3–1)	Miller (1–2)	—	Globe Life Field (33,309)	59–78	L2
138	September 2	Mariners	5–4	Ferguson (3–2)	Voth (2–5)	—	Oakland Coliseum (12,167)	60–78	W1
139	September 3	Mariners	3–2	Harris (3–3)	Thornton (3–3)	—	Oakland Coliseum (3,924)	61–78	W2
140	September 4	Mariners	3–16	Kirby (11–10)	Sears (11–10)	—	Oakland Coliseum (4,390)	61–79	L1
141	September 5	Mariners	4–6	Woo (7–2)	Estes (6–7)	—	Oakland Coliseum (5,581)	61–80	L2
142	September 6	Tigers	7–6 (13)	Holman (1–1)	Brieske (2–4)	—	Oakland Coliseum (14,669)	62–80	W1
143	September 7	Tigers	1–2	Hurter (4–1)	McFarland (2–2)	Foley (21)	Oakland Coliseum (14,694)	62–81	L1
144	September 8	Tigers	1–9	Madden (1–0)	Ginn (0–1)	—	Oakland Coliseum (11,250)	62–82	L2
145	September 10	@ Astros	4–3 (12)	Harris (4–3)	Neris (9–5)	—	Minute Maid Park (36,234)	63–82	W1
146	September 11	@ Astros	5–4	Estes (7–7)	Brown (11–8)	Miller (24)	Minute Maid Park (32,327)	64–82	W2
147	September 12	@ Astros	3–6	Pressly (2–3)	McFarland (2–3)	—	Minute Maid Park (30,720)	64–83	L1
148	September 13	@ White Sox	2–0	Basso (1–0)	Crochet (6–12)	Miller (25)	Guaranteed Rate Field (26,513)	65–83	W1
149	September 14	@ White Sox	6–7	Varland (1–0)	Harris (4–4)	—	Guaranteed Rate Field (21,478)	65–84	L1
150	September 15	@ White Sox	3–4	Burke (1–0)	Sears (11–11)	Ellard (1)	Guaranteed Rate Field (18,017)	65–85	L2
151	September 16	@ Cubs	2–9	Imanaga (14–3)	Estes (7–8)	—	Wrigley Field (34,532)	65–86	L3
152	September 17	@ Cubs	4–3	Spence (8–9)	Wicks (2–4)	Miller (26)	Wrigley Field (32,718)	66–86	W1
153	September 18	@ Cubs	5–3	Ferguson (4–2)	Pearson (2–2)	Miller (27)	Wrigley Field (27,806)	67–86	W2
154	September 20	Yankees	2–4 (10)	Cole (7–5)	McFarland (2–4)	Weaver (3)	Oakland Coliseum (23,426)	67–87	L1
155	September 21	Yankees	0–10	Rodón (16–9)	Sears (11–12)	—	Oakland Coliseum (33,187)	67–88	L2
156	September 22	Yankees	4–7	Gil (15–6)	Estes (7–9)	Weaver (4)	Oakland Coliseum (24,663)	67–89	L3
157	September 24	Rangers	5–4	Miller (2–2)	Sborz (2–2)	—	Oakland Coliseum (30,402)	68–89	W1
158	September 25	Rangers	1–5	Festa (6–1)	Basso (1–1)	—	Oakland Coliseum (35,270)	68–90	L1
159	September 26	Rangers	3–2	Ginn (1–1)	Rocker (0–2)	Miller (28)	Oakland Coliseum (46,889)	69–90	W1
160	September 27	@ Mariners	0–2	Woo (9–3)	Sears (11–13)	Taylor (1)	T-Mobile Park (41,429)	69–91	L1
161	September 28	@ Mariners	6–7 (10)	Bazardo (2–0)	Alexander (1–3)	—	T-Mobile Park (33,007)	69–92	L2
162	September 29	@ Mariners	4–6	Gilbert (9–12)	Spence (8–10)	—	T-Mobile Park (42,177)	69–93	L3

== Season summary ==
=== Opening Day starters ===
Thursday, March 28, 2024, vs. Cleveland Guardians at Oakland Coliseum.

Name	Pos.
Ryan Noda	1B
Zack Gelof	2B
JJ Bleday	CF
Brent Rooker	DH
Seth Brown	LF
J. D. Davis	3B
Shea Langeliers	C
Lawrence Butler	RF
Nick Allen	SS
Alex Wood	P

=== March/April ===
- March 19 – The Athletics announced that Alex Wood would be the opening day starting pitcher.
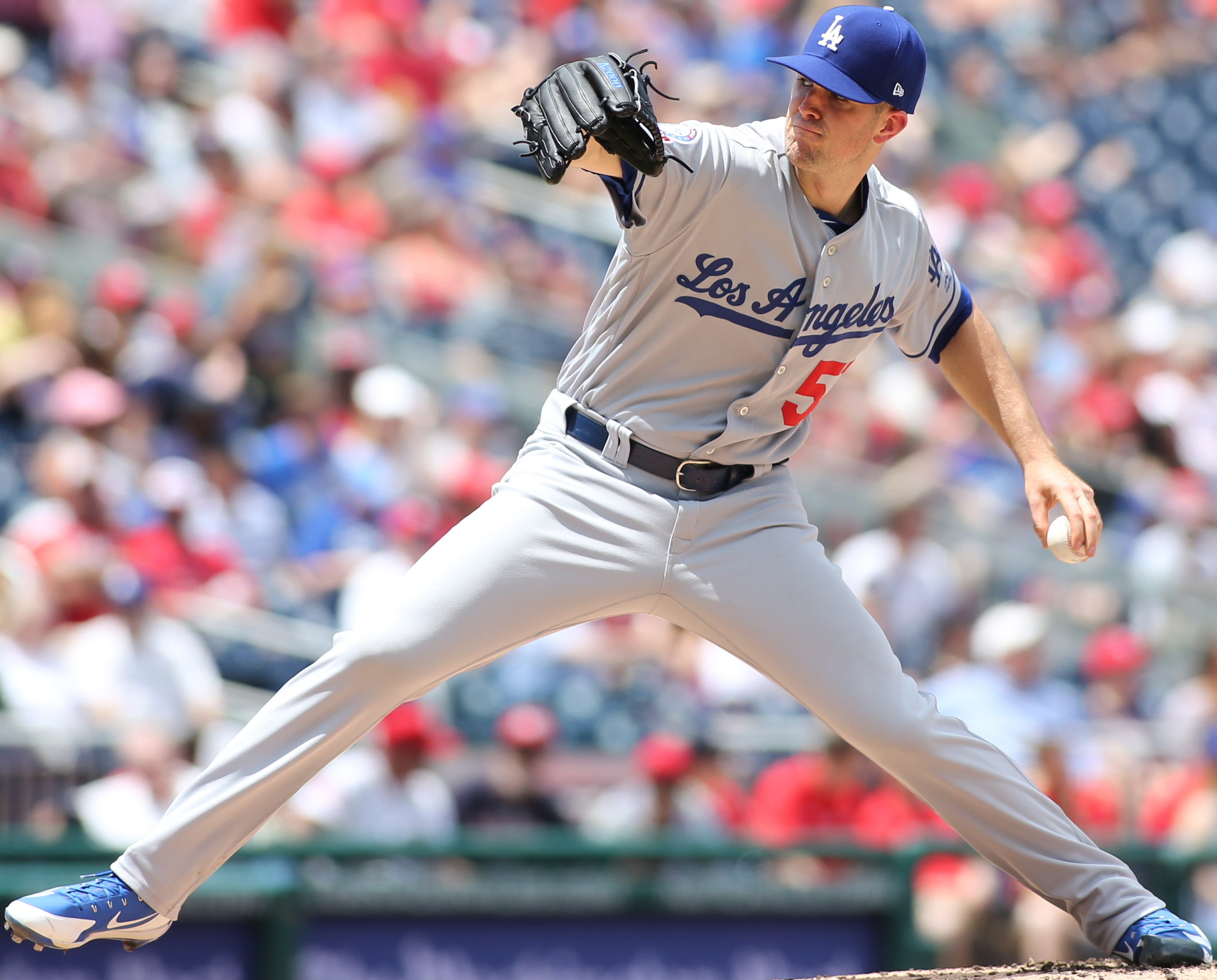
  Alex Wood, seen here with the Los Angeles Dodgers in 2018, was the Athletics Opening Day starting pitcher.
- March 28 – In the first game of the season, the A's faced the Cleveland Guardians at Oakland Coliseum to begin a four-game series. JJ Bleday had two hits, including a double, however, the Guardians shutout Oakland 8–0 in front of a home opening crowd of 13,522 fans.
- March 29 – J. D. Davis slugged his first two home runs of the season, however, the A's lost to the Guardians by a score of 6–4 to remain winless to start the season.
- March 30 – Zack Gelof had two hits, stole a base and scored a run in the Athletics 12–3 loss to Cleveland.
- March 31 – With the bases loaded in the bottom of the ninth, Abraham Toro earned a walk, as the Athletics snapped their three-game losing streak and defeated the Guardians 4–3, earning their first win of the season. Paul Blackburn pitched seven shutout innings, allowing only three hits and struck out three batters in his start. Esteury Ruiz had two hits, scored two runs and stole his first base of the season.
- April 1 – The A's welcomed the Boston Red Sox for a three-game home series. JJ Bleday had two of the Athletics four hits, as the A's were shutout by the Red Sox 9–0. Oakland committed five errors in the loss.
- April 2 – Shea Langeliers hit his first home run of the season and Brent Rooker had two hits, as Oakland lost to the Red Sox by a score of 5–4 in 11 innings.
- April 3 – The Red Sox completed the three-game sweep over the Athletics, as Oakland dropped the series finale, losing 1–0. Ross Stripling pitched seven innings, allowing only one run and struck out three. J. D. Davis had two hits for the A's. With the loss, Oakland finished their season-opening homestand with a 1–6 record.
- April 5 – After an off-day, the A's began their first road trip of the season against the Detroit Tigers at Comerica Park in Detroit, Michigan. Brent Rooker hit a two-run home run and Abraham Toro hit a solo home run, however, the A's lost to the Tigers by a 5-4 score. With the loss, Oakland dropped their fourth consecutive game.
- April 6 - Paul Blackburn pitched six shutout innings, allowing only three hits, leading the Athletics to a 4-0 victory over the Tigers. Brent Rooker hit a two-run home run in the first inning, then drove home another run in the eighth, leading the A's offense.
- April 7 - Zack Gelof had four hits, including a triple and a home run, and drove home four runners, as Oakland won consecutive games for the first time this season, defeating Detroit 7-1. Joe Boyle pitched five shutout innings to earn his first victory of the season.
- April 9 - After a day off, the A's travelled to Globe Life Field in Arlington, Texas for a three-game series against the defending World Series champions, the Texas Rangers. Shea Langeliers hit three home runs and drove home four runs, including a two-run homer in the top of the ninth inning, as the Athletics rallied from behind and defeated the Rangers 4-3 to win their third consecutive game.
- April 10 - Zack Gelof hit a solo home run in the ninth inning, however, the Rangers ended the Athletics three-game winning streak, as Texas won the game 6-2.
- April 11 - In the series finale against the Rangers, JP Sears carried a no-hitter until the seventh inning, as the Athletics shutout Texas 1-0 to win two of the three games in the series. Seth Brown had two hits, including a home run, scoring Oakland's only run.
- April 12 - The A's returned home for a three-game interleague series against the Washington Nationals. In the series opener, Lawrence Butler hit a solo home run in the third inning, then hit the game-winning single in the bottom of the 10th inning, as the Athletics defeated the Nationals for their fifth win in their last six games. Paul Blackburn pitched 6.1 innings of shutout baseball in his start.
- April 13 - Abraham Toro had three hits and drove home the lone Athletics run, as Oakland lost to Washington 3-1.
- April 14 - Lawrence Butler had three hits and scored two helps, as the A's rallied from a 6-1 deficit, scoring six runs in the sixth inning, to defeat the Nationals 7-6. JJ Bleday also had three hits in the game and Abraham Toro drove home two runs. With the win, the A's moved within one game of the division lead.
- April 15 - The A's welcomed the St. Louis Cardinals at home for a three-game interleague series. Esteury Ruiz hit a pinch-hit solo home run in the bottom of the eighth, as Oakland lost to the Cardinals 3-1.
- April 16 - Kyle McCann hit his first career home run, as he finished the game with two hits and drove home two runners, in the Athletics 3-2 loss to the Cardinals.
- April 17 - Esteury Ruiz hit a two-run home run and Tyler Nevin had three hits, as the Athletics avoided the series sweep, defeating the Cardinals 6-3. Paul Blackburn pitched 5.2 innings to earn the victory, improving his record to 3-0 with a 1.08 ERA to begin the season.
- April 19 - After an off-day, the Athletics begin a ten game road trip. Their first stop is a three-game series at Progressive Field in Cleveland, Ohio against the Cleveland Guardians. Abraham Toro led off the game with a home run and Brent Rooker also homered, as the A's dropped the first game of the series 10-2 to Cleveland.
- April 20 - Ryan Noda hand two hits, including his first home run of the season and Max Schuemann hit his first career home run, as Oakland lost to the Guardians by a 6-3 score.
- April 21 - Brent Rooker connected for his fourth home run of the season, however, the Guardians completed the three-game series sweep, defeating the Athletics 6-2.
- April 22 - The Athletics road trip continued as they travelled to Yankee Stadium in The Bronx, New York for a four-game series against the New York Yankees. In the series opener, Zack Gelof broke a scoreless tie with a two-run homerun in the top of the ninth inning, as the A's shutout the Yankees 2-0. JP Sears pitched six shutout innings, striking out seven batters and Mason Miller earned his fifth save of the season.
- April 23 - Shea Langeliers and Lawrence Butler each hit home runs, however, the Athletics dropped a close game, losing 4-3 to the Yankees.
- April 24 - Brent Rooker hit a three-run home run in the Athletics 7-3 loss to the Yankees. With the loss, the A's fall to 1-5 on their road trip.
- April 25 - Tyler Nevin hit a two-run home run, while Nick Allen hit a solo home run, as the Athletics defeated the Yankees 3-1 to split their four-game series. Alex Wood pitched 5.2 innings, allowing only one run, to earn his first victory with Oakland. Mason Miller earned his sixth save of the season.
- April 26 - The A's concluded their road trip with a visit to Oriole Park at Camden Yards in Baltimore, Maryland for a three-game series against the Baltimore Orioles. Down 2-1 in the ninth inning, Abraham Toro hit a double, scoring Brent Rooker to tie the game. In the tenth inning, Rooker hit a double, scoring Shea Langeliers, as the A's completed the comeback and defeated the Orioles 3-2. Mitch Spence pitched three shutout innings in relief to earn the win.
- April 27 - The Orioles held Oakland to only five hits, as Baltimore shutout the Athletics 7-0. JP Sears pitched into the seventh inning in his start, however, he allowed seven earned runs.
- April 28 - Kyle McCann hit a two-run home run in the ninth inning, helping the Athletics complete the comeback and defeat the Orioles 7-6. Seth Brown and Tyler Nevin also hit home runs for Oakland.
- April 29 - The A's return home for a three-game interleague series against the Pittsburgh Pirates. Tyler Nevin homered for the second straight game, as Oakland defeated the Pirates 5-1. With the win, the A's have won four of their past five games.
- April 30 - JJ Bleday hit two home runs, powering the Athletics to a 5-2 victory over the Pirates. Mitch Spence pitched three scoreless innings out of the bullpen to earn the win, and Mason Miller struck out the side in the ninth for his eighth save of the season.

=== May ===
- May 1 - Ross Stripling pitched six shutout innings, earning his first victory with the A's and the first in his career in nearly two years, as Oakland shutout Pittsburgh 4-0 to complete the series sweep. Abraham Toro and Tyler Nevin each homered for the Athletics.
- May 3 - After a day off, the Athletics began a three-game interleague series at home against the Miami Marlins. Brent Rooker hit a two-run home run and JP Sears pitched 6.1 innings, allowing no runs and striking out six, as the Athletics defeated the Marlins 3-1. The A's set an Oakland record for longest shutout streak by their bullpen, as the club allowed no runs in 30.1 innings pitched, until the Marlins scored in the ninth.
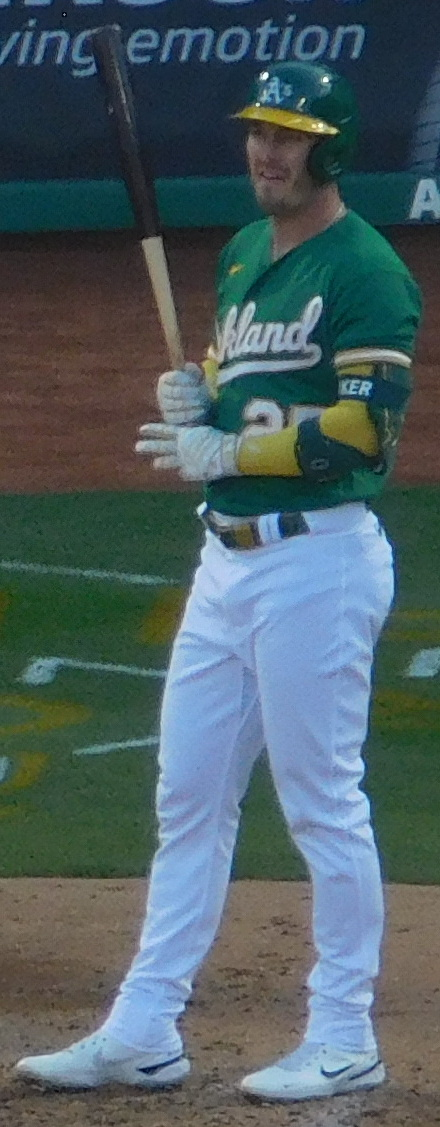
  On May 4th, Brent Rooker, seen here in the 2023 season, became the first Athletics player since Mark McGwire in 1996 to hit two home runs in the same inning.
- May 4 - Oakland extended their winning streak to six games, as they crushed the Marlins 20-4. Brent Rooker homered twice in the third inning, becoming the first Athletics player to home twice in an inning since Mark McGwire in 1996. He finished the game with three hits and five RBI. Brett Harris hit the first two home runs of his career. Shea Langeliers had three hits, including a three run home run and scored three runs. JJ Bleday had three hits, including a home run, and drove home four runners. With the win, the Athletics are back to .500, with a 17-17 record.
- May 5 - The A's saw their winning streak snapped at six games, as the Marlins won the final game of the series by a score of 12-3. Brent Rooker had two hits and scored two runs for Oakland.
- May 6 - Oakland finished their ten-game home stand with a four-game series against their divisional rivals and defending World Series champions, the Texas Rangers. In the first game of the series, JJ Bleday hit a home run, while Abraham Toro had three hits and J. D. Davis had two hits and scored a run, as the Athletics lost 4-2.
- May 7 - Kyle McCann had two hits, including a home run and scored three runs, while Seth Brown hit a three-run home run, however, the A's lost their third game in a row, losing 15-8 to the Rangers. Texas scored ten runs in the second inning to take an early 11-0 lead.
- May 8 - Game 1 - Shea Langeliers had three hits, including a home run and drove home five runners, helping the Athletics snap their losing skid with a 9-4 win over the Rangers in the first game of the doubleheader. Brent Rooker also had three hits, scored three runs and hit a three run home run.
- May 8 - Game 2 - Shea Langeliers had another big game, hitting a two-run home run and driving home three runs, to set an Oakland record for most RBI in a doubleheader, which was previously set by Reggie Jackson on August 14, 1969. Abraham Toro had three hits and scored twice, however, the Rangers split the doubleheader, defeating Oakland 12-11.
- May 10 - The Athletics began a ten-game road trip with a three-game series at T-Mobile Park in Seattle, Washington against their divisional rivals, the Seattle Mariners. Lawrence Butler had two hits and drove home the lone Athletics run, as the Mariners defeated Oakland 8-1.
- May 11 - Max Schuemann hit a three-run double in the fifth inning, as the Athletics defeated the Mariners in 8-1. JJ Bleday hit a solo home run in the victory. Joey Estes pitched five innings, allowing only one run and struck out five, earning his first career victory.
- May 12 - Max Schuemann, Abraham Toro and Brent Rooker each hit home runs, however, Oakland lost the final game of the series against the Mariners by a score of 8-4.
- May 13 - The Athletics road trip continued with a four-game series at Minute Maid Park in Houston, Texas against their divisional rivals, the Houston Astros. JJ Bleday had two hits, including an RBI-double, in the Athletics 9-2 loss to the Astros. The loss was the A's seventh in their past nine games.
- May 14 - Abraham Toro had two hits and scored the only run for the A's, as Oakland lost to the Astros 2-1 in ten innings.
- May 15 - The A's were held to only two hits and dropped their fourth consecutive game, losing 3-0 to Houston. Aaron Brooks pitched seven innings, allowing three runs and struck out five.
- May 16 - Houston completed the four-game sweep against the Athletics, as Oakland lost 8-1, losing their fifth straight game. The A's were held to four hits and scored their lone run on an RBI single by Zack Gelof.
- May 17 - The Athletics ten-game road trip concluded with a three-game series at Kauffman Stadium in Kansas City, Missouri against the Kansas City Royals. The A's struggles continued as the club was held to only four hits in a 6-2 loss to the Royals. Shea Langeliers hit a two-run home run in the ninth to break up the Royals shutout bid.
- May 18 - Seth Brown slugged a home run, while Brent Rooker had two hits and an RBI, however, the Athletics dropped to 2-12 in their past 14 games, as the Royals defeated Oakland 5-3.
- May 19 - The Royals completed the three-game sweep, defeating Oakland 8-4 in the final game of the series. Brent Rooker hit a three-run home run in the ninth for the A's. Oakland finished their ten-game road trip with a 1-9 record.
- May 21 - After a day off, the Athletics returned home for a three-game interleague series against the Colorado Rockies. Abraham Toro hit an eighth inning home run, helping the A's snap their eight-game losing streak, as Oakland defeated Colorado 5-4. J. D. Davis and Seth Brown also homered for the Athletics. Mason Miller pitched a perfect ninth inning, striking out all three batters he faced, to earn his ninth save and lower his season ERA to 0.89.
- May 22 - JJ Bleday hit a home run while Zack Gelof and Brent Rooker each had two hits, however, the Athletics lost to the Rockies by a score of 4-3 in twelve innings.
- May 23 - Down 9-5 in the bottom of the tenth inning, the Athletics rallied for five runs, winning the game 10-9. JJ Bleday hit a home run in the extra inning to tie the game. The A's won the game when Tyler Soderstrom walked with the bases loaded. Seth Brown, Kyle McCann and Max Schuemann each had three hits.
- May 24 - The Athletics hosted their divisional rivals, the Houston Astros for a three-game weekend series. JJ Bleday had two hits and scored three runs and Miguel Andújar had three hits and drove home two runs, as the Athletics lost to the Astros 6-3.
- May 25 - JP Sears pitched six strong innings, allowing only two hits and one unearned run, as the Athletics defeated the Astros 3-1. Mason Miller struck out the side in the ninth inning to earn his tenth save. Brent Rooker hit a two-run double in the first inning in the win.
- May 26 - Shea Langeliers and Max Schuemann each solo home runs for the Athletics in a 5-2 loss to the Astros.
- May 28 - After a day off, the Athletics begin a six-game road trip with a three-game series against the Tampa Bay Rays at Tropicana Field in St. Petersburg, Florida. Miguel Andújar hit a three-run home run, his first homer as an Athletic, as Oakland shutout the Rays 3-0. Mitch Spence pitched 5.1 innings, allowing only one hit and struck out four batters, to improve to 4-2 on the season.
- May 29 - Miguel Andújar had two hits and drove home two runs and JJ Bleday also had two hits, scoring a run, as the A's lost a close game to Tampa Bay, by a 4-3 score.
- May 30 - JJ Bleday and Abraham Toro each had three hits, while Shea Langeliers had two hits, including a two-run home run, as the Athletics lost the series finale by a 6-5 score in twelve innings to the Rays.
- May 31 - The Athletics head to Atlanta, Georgia for a three game interleague series against the Atlanta Braves at Truist Park. Miguel Andújar had two hits and scored a run, while Zack Gelof had a hit, scored a run and drove home a runner, as the Athletics lost their third game in a row, losing 4-2 to the Braves.

=== June ===
- June 1 - Miguel Andújar had four hits, including a home run, drove home four runners and scored three runs, while Brent Rooker had two hits, also hitting a home run, and drove home four runners, as the Athletics defeated the Braves 11-9.
- June 2 - The Athletics were held to only two hits, as the Braves defeated Oakland 3-1. Zack Gelof hit a solo home run for the A's.
- June 4 - After a scheduled day off, the A's returned to action with a three-game home series against their divisional rivals, the Seattle Mariners. JJ Bleday had two hits and a run, as the Athletics lost to the Mariners 4-3.
- June 5 - Joey Estes took a perfect game into the seventh inning, as the Athletics defeated the Mariners 2-1. Zack Gelof had two hits, including a home run.
- June 6 - The Athletics were limited to only two hits, as they lost to the Mariners 3-0. JP Sears took the loss despite a strong start, as he pitched six innings, allowed two runs and struck out eight batters.
- June 7 - The A's welcomed the Toronto Blue Jays for a three-game home series. JJ Bleday hit a walk off solo home run in the bottom of the ninth inning, as the Athletics defeated the Blue Jays 2-1. Mason Miller, who pitched a perfect ninth inning, earned his first career victory. Hogan Harris pitched six shutout innings in his start, allowing only three hits.
- June 8 - Oakland was held to only five hits, as they were shutout 7-0 by the Blue Jays.
- June 9 - Brent Rooker hit a solo home run and Abraham Toro drove home two runners, as the Athletics lost to the Blue Jays 6-4 in ten innings. Mitch Spence pitched seven innings in his start, allowing five hits and two runs.
- June 10 - Oakland began a seven-game road trip with a three-game interleague series at Petco Park in San Diego, California against the San Diego Padres. Tyler Soderstrom hit a solo home run, however, the A's offense struggled, as the Padres defeated Oakland 6-1.
- June 11 - The Athletics lost their fourth game in a row, losing 4-3 to the Padres. Tyler Soderstrom had two hits, including a two-run home run, while Abraham Toro had two hits, which included a solo home run.
- June 12 - The Padres completed the series sweep, defeating the Athletics 5-4, extending Oakland's losing streak to five games. Miguel Andújar had two hits, bringing his season batting average up to .323.
- June 13 - The A's finished off their road trip with a four-game series against the Minnesota Twins at Target Field in Minneapolis, Minnesota. In the first game, Tyler Soderstrom hit a two-run home run, however, Oakland lost their sixth consecutive game, losing 6-2 to the Twins.
- June 14 - Shea Langeliers hit a first inning grand slam, giving Oakland an early 4-0 lead, however, the Twins rallied back and defeated the Athletics 6-5 in ten innings. The loss drops the A's to a 9-29 record in their past 38 games and is their seventh straight loss.
- June 15 - The A's game against the Twins was postponed due to rain. The teams will play in a doubleheader on June 16th.
- June 16 - Game 1 - JJ Bleday and J. D. Davis each had two hits and Daz Cameron hit a home run, as the A's lost their eighth game in a row, losing 6-2 to the Twins.
- June 16 - Game 2 - JJ Bleday had four hits, including a home run, and scored twice, while Tyler Soderstrom had three hits, scored twice, hit a home run and drove home two runners, as the Athletics lost the second game of the double header, losing 8-7 to the Twins.

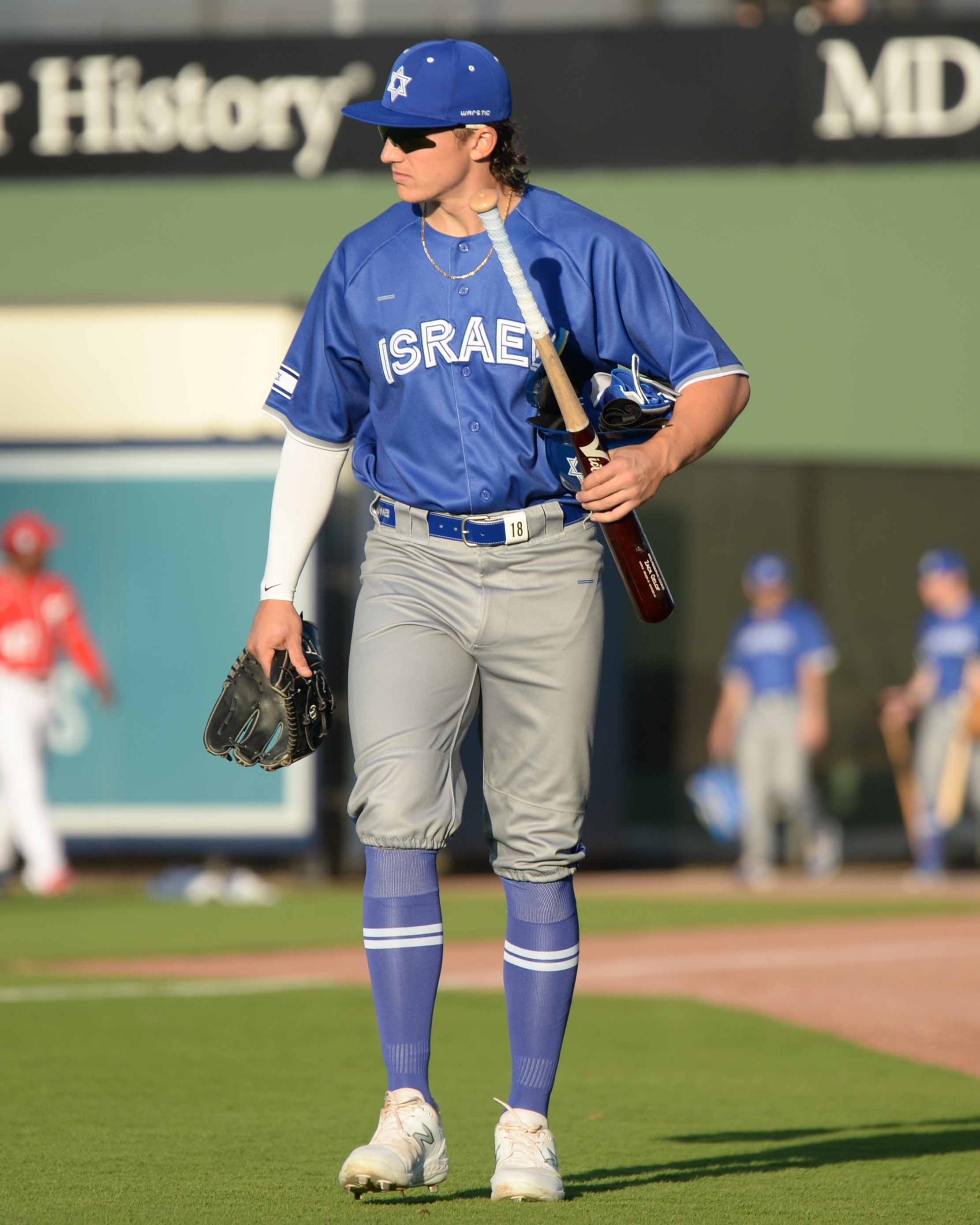
Zack Gelof, seen here with the Israel national baseball team in 2023, homered in three straight games from June 20-22.

- June 18 - After a day off, the A's returned home for a three game series against the Kansas City Royals. Zack Gelof hit a three-run home run and JJ Bleday had three hits and drove home two runners, as the Athletics snapped their nine game losing skid, defeating Kansas City 7-5.
- June 19 - Zack Gelof hit a solo home run and Brent Rooker drove home two runners, as the Athletics defeated the Royals for the second straight game, winning 5-1. Luis Medina earned his first win of the season as he pitched 5.2 innings, allowing only one run, in his start.
- June 20 - Zack Gelof homered for the third straight game, hitting a two-run shot, however, the Royals defeated the Athletics 3-2.
- June 21 - The Athletics hosted the Minnesota Twins for a three-game home series. Shea Langeliers hit a two-run go ahead home run in the bottom of the eighth inning, as the Athletics defeated the Twins 6-5.
- June 22 - JJ Bleday and Tyler Soderstrom each hit solo home runs. JP Sears struggled in his start, allowing eight runs in 1.1 innings pitched, as the Twins crushed the Athletics 10-2.
- June 23 - Miguel Andújar had two hits for the Athletics, however, Oakland was shutout by the Twins 3-0.
- June 24 - The A's were on the road for a three-game series against their divisional rivals, the Los Angeles Angels at Angel Stadium in Anaheim, California. In the first game of the series, Tyler Nevin hit a solo home run, as the Athletics lost the game by a 5-1 score.
- June 25 - Armando Alvarez had three hits and Brent Rooker hit a solo home run, however, Oakland lost their fourth in a row, losing 7-5 to the Los Angeles Angels.
- June 26 - The A's lost their fifth game in a row, falling 5-2 to the Angels. Armando Alvarez scored both of the runs for Oakland.
- June 28 - After a scheduled day off, the Athletics wrapped up their road trip with a three-game interleague series against the Arizona Diamondbacks at Chase Field in Phoenix, Arizona. Zack Gelof had three hits and two runs, while the A's slugged four home runs in the final two innings of the game, snapping their five-game losing streak with a 9-4 victory over the Diamondbacks.
- June 29 - The Athletics offense struggled, as the team managed to get only two hits in a 3-0 loss to the Diamondbacks.
- June 30 - Zack Gelof hit a solo home run, as the Athletics lost the final game of the series by a score of 5-1 to the Diamondbacks.

=== July ===
- July 2 - The Athletics returned home for a three-game series against their divisional rivals, the Los Angeles Angels. Lawrence Butler hit a three-run home run and Brent Rooker hit a solo home run, leading the Athletics to a 7-5 win over the Angels.
- July 3 - Joey Estes pitched a complete game shutout, allowing only five hits, as the Athletics defeated the Angels 5-0. Brent Rooker had three hits and hit his 17th home run of the season.
- July 4 - Lawrence Butler hit a home run and JP Sears pitched five innings, allowing two hits and no runs, as the Athletics shutout the Angels for the second consecutive game, winning 5-0, to sweep the three-game series.
- July 5 - The Athletics hosted the best team in the American League, the Baltimore Orioles, for a three-game series. Shea Langeliers and Miguel Andújar each hit solo home runs for the A's, as Oakland lost to the Orioles by a score of 3-2.
- July 6 - Oakland's offense exploded for 18 hits, as Brent Rooker led the way with three hits, including a three-run home run, as he drove home four runners and scored three times, as the Athletics crushed the Orioles 19-8. Miguel Andújar, Brett Harris and Tyler Nevin each had three hits in the victory.
- July 7 - Tyler Soderstrom had two hits and drove home a runner, as the A's lost the final game of the series, dropping the game 6-3 to the Orioles.
- July 9 - Following an off-day, the Athletics visit Fenway Park in Boston, Massachusetts for a three-game series against the Boston Red Sox. Zack Gelof had three hits, including a home run, and drove home four runners while Lawrence Butler hit a three-run home run in the Athletics 12-9 loss to Boston.
- July 10 - JP Sears allowed only one run in 5.2 innings pitched, while Lawrence Butler had two hits and drove home two runners, as the Athletics defeated the Red Sox 5-2. Mason Miller picked up his 15th save of the season after pitching a scoreless ninth inning.
- July 11 - The Athletics were held to only four singles in a 7-0 shutout loss to the Red Sox.
- July 12 - The A's finished the first half of the season with a three-game interleague road series against the Philadelphia Phillies at Citizens Bank Park in Philadelphia, Pennsylvania. Shea Langeliers had two hits and drove home two runners and Lawrence Butler hit a two-run pinch hit homerun, as the Athletics defeated the Phillies 6-2.
- July 13 - Brent Rooker had three hits, including a home run, however, the Athletics lost to the Phillies by score of 11-5.

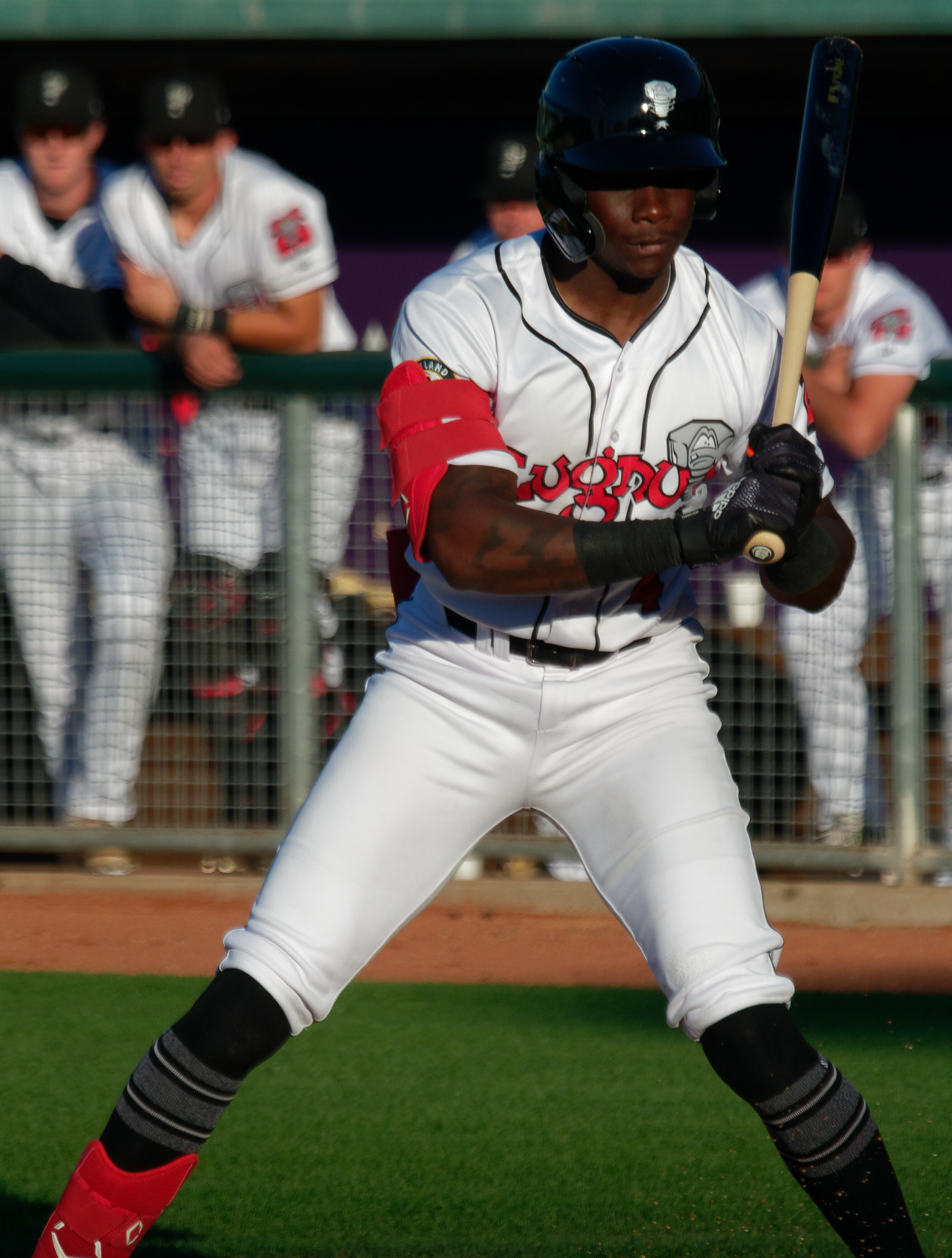
Lawrence Butler, seen here with the Lansing Lugnuts in 2021, hit three home runs and drove home six runs in a 18-3 win over the Phillies on July 14th.

- July 14 - Lawrence Butler hit three home runs and drove home six runners, Brent Rooker hit two home runs and drove home five runners and Seth Brown also hit two home runs, driving home three runners, leading the Athletics to a 18-3 victory over the Phillies. Zack Gelof hit a ninth inning grand slam to cap off the scoring for Oakland.
- July 16 - The 2024 Major League Baseball All-Star Game was held at Globe Life Field in Arlington, Texas. Mason Miller pitched one inning in relief, allowing no base runners and struck out two batters, to earn the win for the American League in a 5-3 victory over the National League.
- July 19 - Following the All-Star break, the A's returned home for a three-game series against their divisional rivals, the Los Angeles Angels. Max Schuemann had three hits, including a two-run home run, scored three times and drove home four runners, as the Athletics crushed the Angels 13-3. Shea Langeliers and JJ Bleday also homered for the A's.
- July 20 - The A's extended their winning streak to three games, as Lawrence Butler had three hits and drove home three runs and Brent Rooker hit a three-run home run, leading Oakland to an 8-2 victory.
- July 21 - Miguel Andújar had three hits, including a solo home run, while Brent Rooker drove home two runners, however, the Angels won the final game of the series, defeating Oakland 8-5.
- July 22 - The A's wrapped up their six-game home stand as their divisional rivals, the Houston Astros visited for a three-game series. Hogan Harris pitched 6.2 shutout innings, striking out seven batters, leading the A's to a 4-0 victory over the Astros.
- July 23 - Lawrence Butler, Brent Rooker, Seth Brown, Zack Gelof and Shea Langeliers all connected for home runs, as the Athletics defeated the Astros 8-2.
- July 24 - Miguel Andújar had two hits and drove home the lone Athletics run, as Houston defeated Oakland 8-1 in the final game of the series.
- July 25 - The A's were on the road for a four-game series at Angel Stadium in Anaheim, California to face their divisional rivals, the Los Angeles Angels. Lawrence Butler and Brent Rooker each hit home runs, as the A's beat the Angels 6-5.
- July 26 - Brent Rooker hit a two-run home run, his tenth homer of the month, leading the Athletics to a 5-4 win over the Angels. With the victory, Oakland now has a record of 13-7 in July, securing their first winning month since posting a 14-12 record in July 2022.
- July 27 - Shea Langeliers hit a three-run home run in the first inning and Mitch Spence pitched six innings, allowing only one run, as Oakland defeated the Angels 3-1. With the win, the A's have won eight of their past ten games.
- July 28 - Brent Rooker had two hits, including a three-run double, however, the A's dropped the final game of the series, losing 8-6 to the Angels.
- July 30 - Following an off day, the Athletics travelled to Oracle Park in San Francisco, California for the first two games of the Bay Bridge Series against the San Francisco Giants. The Athletics offense hit four home runs, as Daz Cameron, Lawrence Butler, Brent Rooker and JJ Bleday each connected, leading the A's to a 5-2 win over the Giants. JP Sears earned his eighth win of the season after pitching seven shutout innings, striking out nine batters.
- July 31 - The Athletics were held to five hits, as the Giants defeated Oakland 1-0. JJ Bleday had two of the A's hits.

=== August ===
- August 2 - The A's welcomed the Los Angeles Dodgers for a three-game home interleague series. Shea Langeliers, Seth Brown and Brent Rooker each hit home runs, while Joey Estes pitched six strong innings, allowing only two runs and striking out six, as the Athletics defeated the Dodgers 6-5.
- August 3 - Seth Brown had two hits, however, the Dodgers shutout the Athletics by a score of 10-0 in front of a season-high crowd of 35,207.
- August 4 - Brent Rooker slugged his 28th home run of the season, a two-run homer, however, the Athletics lost to the Dodgers 3-2.
- August 5 - The Athletics closed out their home stand with a three-game series against the Chicago White Sox. Lawrence Butler homered and Zack Gelof scored two runs. JP Sears pitched seven innings, allowing only a run and struck out five, earning his ninth win of the season, as Oakland defeated the White Sox 5-1.
- August 6 - Zack Gelof had two hits, including a solo home run, while Brent Rooker and Miguel Andújar also had two hits, however, the Athletics lost to the White Sox 5-1. With the win, Chicago snapped their 21-game losing streak.
- August 7 - The Athletics came from behind, scoring three runs in the seventh inning, to defeat the White Sox 3-2. Zack Gelof had two hits and drove home a runner in the victory. Mason Miller pitched a perfect ninth inning to earn his 16th save of the season.
- August 9 - After an off-day, the A's were on the road for a three-game series at Rogers Centre in Toronto, Ontario, Canada against the Toronto Blue Jays. Darell Hernáiz hit his first career home run, however, the Athletics lost to the Blue Jays 3-1.
- August 10 - Brent Rooker hit a solo home run while Osvaldo Bido pitched six shutout innings, allowing only two hits in the Athletics 1-0 win over the Blue Jays. Shea Langeliers had four hits and Mason Miller struck out three in the ninth to earn his 17th save in the win.
- August 11 - In the first inning, JJ Bleday hit a three-run home run, followed by a two-run home run by Zack Gelof, as the A's took an early 6-0 lead. JP Sears pitched seven innings, allowing three runs, to earn his tenth win of the season, as Oakland defeated Toronto 8-4.
- August 13 - After a travel day, the Athletics concluded their road trip with a three-game interleague series against the New York Mets at Citi Field in Queens, New York. Shea Langeliers had four hits, hit a home run and drove home four runners, while Brent Rooker and JJ Bleday scored three runs in the Athletics 9-4 win over the Mets.
- August 14 - Miguel Andújar had two hits and scored the lone Athletics run, as the Mets defeated Oakland 9-1.

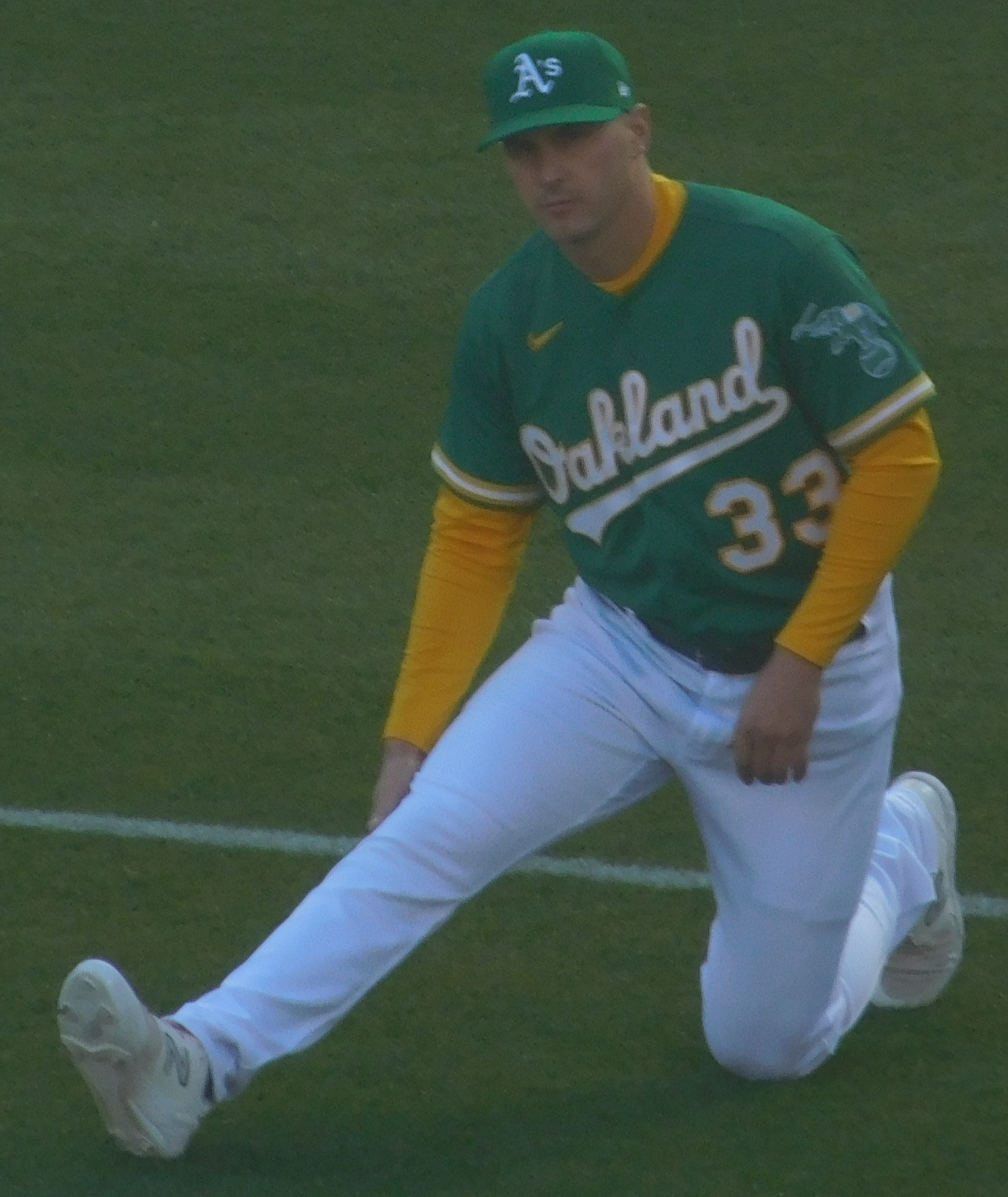
JJ Bleday, seen here with the Athletics in 2023, hit a grand slam in a 7-6 win over the New York Mets on August 15.

- August 15 - JJ Bleday had three hits, including a grand slam, while Shea Langeliers also had three hits, scoring once, as Oakland came from behind to defeat the Mets 7-6. At three hours and forty-five minutes, this game was timed as the longest game of the pitch clock era.
- August 17 - After an off-day, the A's were back at home to host the San Francisco Giants for the final two games of the Bay Bridge Series. Osvaldo Bido pitched six shutout innings, allowing only one hit and striking out six batters, while Seth Brown had three hits and drove home a run, as the Athletics shutout the Giants 2-0.
- August 18 - JP Sears pitched seven innings, allowing just one run and struck out nine, however, he received a no-decision, as the Athletics lost to the Giants 4-2 in ten innings. The teams split the Bay Bridge Series for the 2024 season, as each team won two games.
- August 19 - The Athletics host the Tampa Bay Rays for a four-game series. JJ Bleday hit a two-run home run, while Joe Boyle pitched six innings of shutout baseball, earning his third win of the season, as the Athletics defeated the Rays 3-0.
- August 20 - The Rays held Oakland to only three hits, as Tampa Bay defeated the A's 1-0.
- August 21 - JJ Bleday hit a solo home run, however, the Athletics lost their second straight to the Rays, losing 4-2.
- August 22 - Lawrence Butler had two hits, drove home a run and scored a run. Osvaldo Bido had a strong start, pitching five innings and allowing only two hits and a run, as he earned his fifth win, while Mason Miller pitched a scoreless ninth inning to earn his 20th save of the season, leading Oakland to a 3-1 win over the Rays.
- August 23 - The Athletics close out their home stand with a three-game interleague series against the Milwaukee Brewers. Lawrence Butler hit a leadoff home run in the first inning and Seth Brown had two hits and scored a run in Oakland's 11-3 loss to the Brewers.
- August 24 - Brent Rooker had three hits, including a solo home run, and Zack Gelof had three hits, scoring two runs, however, the Athletics lost to the Brewers 9-5.
- August 25 - The Athletics scored all four of their runs in the fourth inning, while Joey Estes pitched 5.2 innings, allowing two runs and striking out five, as Oakland avoided being swept, defeating the Brewers 4-3.
- August 27 - Following a travel day, the Athletics were on the road for a three-game interleague series against the Cincinnati Reds at Great American Ballpark in Cincinnati, Ohio. Max Schuemann and Lawrence Butler each hit two-run home runs in the seventh inning, then Zack Gelof hit an eighth inning solo home run, as the Athletics defeated the Reds 5-4.
- August 28 - Seth Brown hit two home runs and drove home four runners, leading the Athletics to a 9-6 victory over the Reds. Lawrence Butler and Brent Rooker also homered in the win.
- August 29 - Lawrence Butler hit three home runs and drove home four runs and JJ Bleday had five hits, including a home run, however, the A's dropped the final game of the series to the Reds, losing 10-9.
- August 30 - Oakland finished their road trip with a three-game series against the Texas Rangers at Globe Life Field in Arlington, Texas. Brent Rooker hit two home runs and scored three runs, JJ Bleday had two hits, including a home run, and drove home four runners and Shea Langeliers also hit a homer, as the Athletics routed the Rangers 9-2.
- August 31 - Lawrence Butler had two hits, including a solo home run, however, the A's lost to the Rangers 3-2.

=== September ===
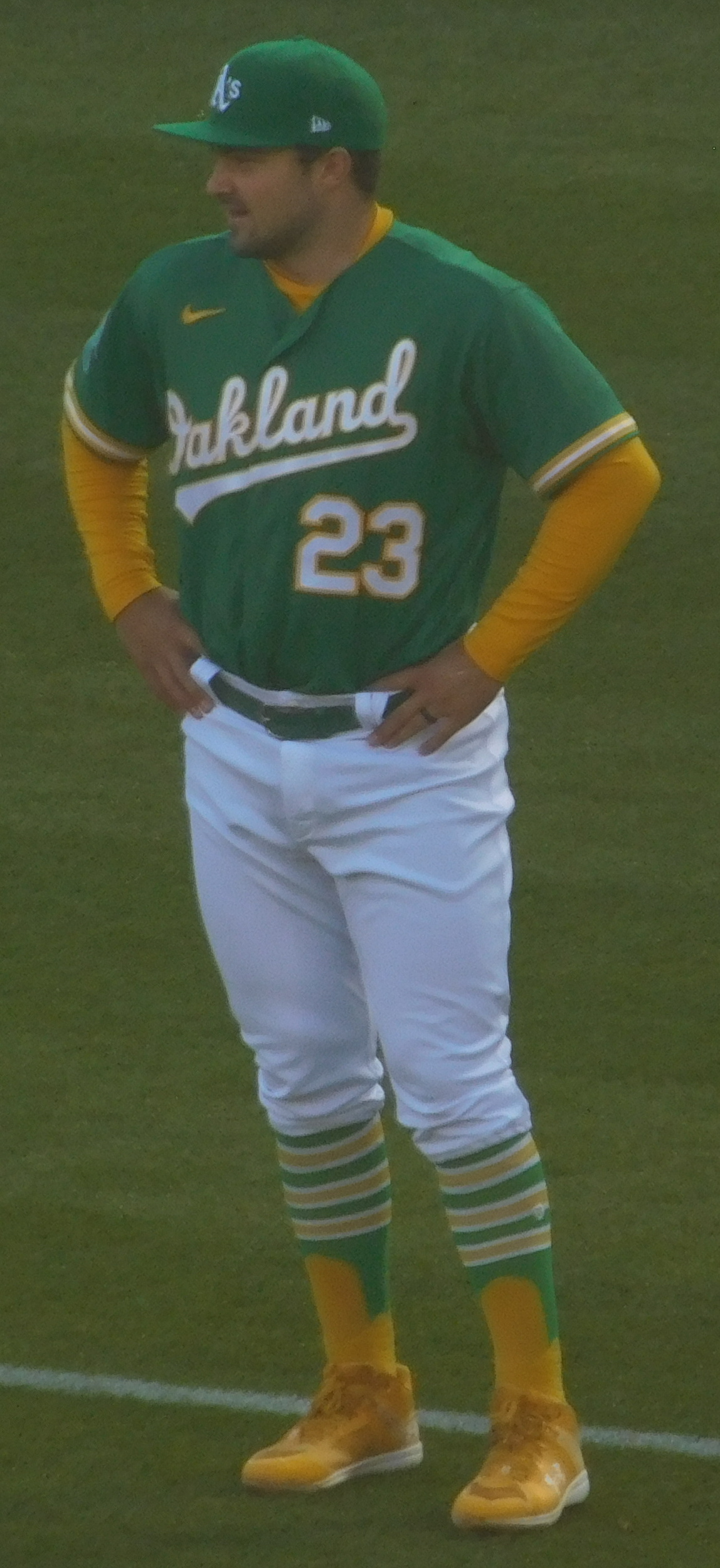
Shea Langeliers, seen here with the Athletics in 2023, hit two home runs, including a walkoff homer, in a 5-4 win over the Seattle Mariners on September 2nd.

- September 1 - Lawrence Butler and Brent Rooker each had four hits, while Zack Gelof had three hits, scored a run and drove home another run in the Athletics 6-4 loss to the Rangers in ten innings.
- September 2 - The Athletics returned home and faced the Seattle Mariners for a four-game series. Shea Langeliers hit two home runs, including a walk off homer in the bottom of the ninth inning, and drove home four runs, as the A's defeated the Mariners 5-4.
- September 3 - Seth Brown hit a home run in the fourth inning and hit a game-winning single in the ninth inning, leading Oakland to a 3-2 win over the Mariners. J.T. Ginn pitched six solid innings in his start, allowing two runs and struck out seven, while Hogan Harris pitched three shutout innings, allowing no hits, to earn the win.
- September 4 - Brent Rooker had two hits, scored a run and drove home another run in the Athletics 16-3 loss to the Mariners.
- September 5 - Brent Rooker hit two home runs, bringing his season total to 35, and drove home three runs, however, the A's dropped the final game of the series, losing 6-4 to the Mariners.
- September 6- The Athletics hosted the Detroit Tigers for a three-game home series. In the 13th inning, Seth Brown hit a game-winning single, scoring JJ Bleday, as the A's defeated the Tigers 7-6.
- September 7 - Oakland's offense was held to only one run, when Kyle McCann singled home Zack Gelof, as the A's lost to the Tigers 2-1. Brady Basso pitched six scoreless innings in his start, allowing only three hits and striking out six batters.
- September 8 - Shea Langeliers and Zack Gelof each had two hits, however, Oakland lost their fourth game in their last five games played, losing 9-1 to the Tigers.
- September 10 - The A's began a nine-game road trip with a three-game series against the division leading Houston Astros at Minute Maid Park in Houston, Texas. Zack Gelof had two hits, including a solo home run, and scored twice, helping the Athletics defeated the Astros 4-3 in twelve innings.
- September 11 - Kyle McCann hit a two-run home run while Brent Rooker had two hits and drove home two runners and Max Schuemann also had two hits and scored twice, leading the A's to a 5-4 win over the Astros. Joey Estes earned the win, pitching 6.2 innings, allowing two earned runs, bringing his season record to 7-7.
- September 12 - Brent Rooker hit his 36th home run of the season, while Tyler Nevin also hit a solo home run, as the Athletics lost to the Astros 6-3.
- September 13 - Oakland's road trip continued with a three-game weekend series at Guaranteed Rate Field in Chicago, Illinois to face the Chicago White Sox. Brent Rooker each Zack Gelof each drove home runs, and Brady Basso picked up his first career victory, pitching 5.1 scoreless innings, as the Athletics shutout the White Sox 2-0.
- September 14 - Brent Rooker had three hits and drove home two runs, bringing his season RBI total to 105, however, Oakland lost to the White Sox 7-6. With the loss, the A's were officially eliminated from the post-season.
- September 15 - Brent Rooker hit his 37th home run of the season, a two-run shot, and Shea Langeliers hit his 26th home run, a solo homer, as the A's lost to the White Sox 4-3.
- September 16 - The A's travelled to the North Side of Chicago, Illinois to Wrigley Field for a three-game interleague series against the Chicago Cubs. Brent Rooker hit a two-run home run, his 38th of the season, however, the A's lost their third in a row, losing 9-2 to the Cubs.
- September 17 - Shea Langeliers hit two home runs, bringing his season total to 28, and drove home three runners, while Lawrence Butler hit a solo home run, as Oakland snapped their three-game losing skid with a 4-3 win over the Cubs.
- September 18 - Tyler Soderstrom hit a home run and drove home two runs, while Brent Rooker had two hits and drew two walks, leading the Athletics to a 5-3 win over the Cubs.
- September 20 - After an off-day, the Athletics began their final homestand in Oakland with a three-game series against the New York Yankees. Shea Langeliers and JJ Bleday each drove home a run, as the A's lost to the Yankees 4-2 in ten innings.
- September 21 - Shea Langeliers had two hits, however, the Athletics were shutout by the Yankees, losing 10-0.
- September 22 - Tyler Soderstrom had two hits and drove home two runs, while Ryan Noda had a pinch-hit double, but the Yankees completed the three-game sweep, defeating Oakland 7-4.
- September 24 - After an off-day, the Athletics host the Texas Rangers for their last ever home series in Oakland. Lawrence Butler and Shea Langeliers each scored two runs, and Jacob Wilson singled home Zack Gelof in the bottom of the ninth inning, leading the Athletics to a 5-4 win over the Rangers.
- September 25 - Lawrence Butler and Brent Rooker each had two hits in the A's 5-1 loss to the Rangers.
- September 26 - The Athletics played their final game at both the Oakland Coliseum and in Oakland. Jacob Wilson had two hits and scored two runs, while JJ Bleday drove home two runs, as the Athletics defeated the Rangers 3-2. Mason Miller earned his 28th save of the season and J. T. Ginn earned the final victory in Oakland.
- September 27 - The A's closed out their season on the road for a three-game series against the Seattle Mariners at T-Mobile Park in Seattle, Washington. Oakland was held to five hits in a 2-0 shutout loss to the Mariners.
- September 28 - Brent Rooker connected for his 39th home run of the season, a two-run homer, while Shea Langeliers hit his 29th homer of the season, a solo shot, in the Athletics 7-6 loss to the Mariners in ten innings.
- September 29 - The Athletics played their final game as an Oakland based team. Tyler Nevin and Darell Hernáiz each drove home two runs, however, the Mariners completed the series sweep, defeating the Athletics 6-4. Oakland finished the 2024 season with a 69-93 record and in fourth place in the American League West, which was a 19-game improvement over their record of 50-112 in the 2023 season.

=== Transactions ===
==== March 2024 ====
March 28	Selected contract of C Kyle McCann from Las Vegas Aviators. Placed 3B Miguel Andújar (right knee lateral meniscus surgery) on the 10-day injured list retroactive to March 25. Placed RHP Luis Medina (right knee MCL sprain) on the 15-day injured list retroactive to March 25. Placed RHP Freddy Tarnok (right hip inflammation) on the 15-day injured list retroactive to March 25. Placed LHP Scott Alexander (left rib bone contusion) on the 15-day injured list retroactive to March 25. Placed SS Aledmys Díaz (right calf strain) on the 60-day injured list retroactive to March 25. Placed LHP Sean Newcomb (left knee inflammation) on the 60-day injured list retroactive to March 25.
March 31	Designated RHP Adrián Martínez for assignment. Claimed 3B Tyler Nevin off waivers from Baltimore Orioles.

==== April 2024 ====
April 1	Optioned OF Esteury Ruiz to Las Vegas Aviators. Activated 3B Tyler Nevin.
April 3	Sent RHP Adrián Martínez outright to Las Vegas Aviators.
April 4	Signed free agent 1B Quincy Nieporte from Detroit Tigers to a minor league contract.
April 6	Traded cash to Chicago White Sox for RHP Alex Speas. Designated RHP Zach Jackson for assignment.
April 9	Sent RHP Zach Jackson outright to Las Vegas Aviators.
April 11	Placed OF Brent Rooker (costochondral cartilage injury) on the 10-day injured list. Selected the contract of 2B Max Schuemann from Las Vegas Aviators. Transferred RHP Luis Medina (right knee MCL sprain) from the 15-day injured list to the 60-day injured list.
April 15	Placed 3B J. D. Davis (right adductor strain) on the 10-day injured list. Recalled OF Esteury Ruiz from Las Vegas Aviators.
April 18	Optioned SS Darell Hernáiz to Las Vegas Aviators.
April 19	Activated OF Brent Rooker from the 10-day injured list.
April 25	Placed 3B Zack Gelof (strained left oblique) on the 10-day injured list retroactive to April 24. Recalled SS Darell Hernáiz from Las Vegas Aviators.
April 28	Sent 3B J. D. Davis on a rehab assignment to Las Vegas Aviators.

==== May 2024 ====
May 2	Optioned 1B Ryan Noda to Las Vegas Aviators.
May 3	Optioned SS Nick Allen to Las Vegas Aviators. Selected the contract of 3B Brett Harris from Las Vegas Aviators. Sent LHP Scott Alexander on a rehab assignment to Stockton Ports. Activated 3B J. D. Davis from the 10-day injured list. Transferred RHP Freddy Tarnok from the 15-day injured list to the 60-day injured list. Signed free agent RHP Seth Elledge from the Atlanta Braves to a minor league contract.
May 6	Placed RHP Joe Boyle (back strain) on the 15-day injured list. Recalled LHP Hogan Harris from Las Vegas Aviators.
May 7	Optioned RHP Dany Jiménez to Las Vegas Aviators. Designated LF Lazaro Armenteros for assignment. Selected the contract of RHP Tyler Ferguson from Las Vegas Aviators.
May 8	Designated RHP Alex Speas for assignment. Placed SS Darell Hernáiz (left ankle injury) on the 10-day injured list. Optioned LHP Hogan Harris to Las Vegas Aviators. Recalled RHP Osvaldo Bido from Las Vegas Aviators. Selected the contract of LHP Easton Lucas from Las Vegas Aviators. Recalled C Tyler Soderstrom from Las Vegas Aviators.
May 10	Sent LHP Scott Alexander on a rehab assignment to Las Vegas Aviators. Sent SS Aledmys Díaz on a rehab assignment to Las Vegas Aviators. Sent 3B Zack Gelof on a rehab assignment to Las Vegas Aviators. Optioned RHP Osvaldo Bido to Las Vegas Aviators. RHP Alex Speas claimed off of waivers by Houston Astros.
May 11	Optioned LHP Easton Lucas to Las Vegas Aviators. Recalled RHP Joey Estes from Las Vegas Aviators.
May 13	Optioned RHP Paul Blackburn (stress reaction of the fifth metatarsal of his right foot) on the 15-day injured list retroactive to May 11. Recalled LHP Easton Lucas from Las Vegas Aviators.
May 14	Activated 3B Zack Gelof from the 10-day injured list. Sent 3B Miguel Andújar on a rehab assignment to Las Vegas Aviators. Optioned 1B Lawrence Butler to Las Vegas Aviators. Recalled LHP Brady Basso from Midland RockHounds. Optioned LHP Easton Lucas to Las Vegas Aviators.
May 15	Transferred SS Darell Hernáiz (left ankle injury) from the 10-day injured list to the 60-day injured list. Placed LHP Alex Wood (left rotator cuff tendonitis) on the 15-day injured list retroactive to May 13. Selected the contract of RHP Aaron Brooks from Las Vegas Aviators. Optioned LHP Brady Basso to Las Vegas Aviators. Recalled LHP Hogan Harris from Las Vegas Aviators. Sent RHP Joe Boyle on a rehab assignment to Las Vegas Aviators. Sent RHP Luis Medina on a rehab assignment to ACL Athletics.
May 16	Acquired RHP Brandon Bielak from the Houston Astros for cash considerations. Designated LHP Easton Lucas for assignment.
May 17	Optioned LHP Hogan Harris to Las Vegas Aviators. Activated RHP Brandon Bielak. Signed free agent LHP Robert Dugger from the SSG Landers of the KBO League to a minor league contract.
May 18	LHP Easton Lucas claimed off of waivers by Detroit Tigers. Sent LHP Sean Newcomb on a rehab assignment to ACL Athletics.
May 21	Optioned RHP Tyler Ferguson to Las Vegas Aviators. Activated LHP Scott Alexander from the 15-day injured list.
May 22	Sent LHP Sean Newcomb on a rehab assignment to Las Vegas Aviators. Sent Luis Medina on a rehab assignment to Las Vegas Aviators.
May 23	Placed 2B Esteury Ruiz (strained left wrist) on the 10-day injured list. Designated 3B Jordan Díaz for assignment. Selected the contract of CF Daz Cameron from Las Vegas Aviators.
May 24	Optioned 3B Brett Harris to Las Vegas Aviators. Activated 3B Miguel Andújar from the 10-day injured list.
May 25	Designated RHP Brandon Bielak for assignment. Placed RHP Ross Stripling (right elbow strain) on the 15-day injured list. Selected the contract of LHP Jack O'Loughlin from Las Vegas Aviators. Recalled RHP Tyler Ferguson from Las Vegas Aviators.
May 27	Sent 3B Jordan Díaz outright to Las Vegas Aviators.
May 28	Designated 3B Tyler Nevin for assignment. Activated SS Aledmys Díaz from the 60-day injured list.
May 29	Sent RHP Brandon Bielak outright to Las Vegas Aviators.
May 30	Placed LHP Kyle Muller (left shoulder tendinitis) on the 15-day injured list retroactive to May 27. Recalled LHP Hogan Harris from Las Vegas Aviators.
May 31	Placed RHP Lucas Erceg (strained right forearm) on the 15-day injured list retroactive to May 26. Optioned RHP Tyler Ferguson to Las Vegas Aviators. Sent 3B Tyler Nevin outright to Las Vegas Aviators. Recalled RHP Dany Jiménez from Las Vegas Aviators. Recalled LHP Brady Basso from Las Vegas Aviators.

==== June 2024 ====
June 1	RHP Freddy Tarnok claimed off of waivers by Philadelphia Phillies.
June 2	Designated RHP Aaron Brooks for assignment. Activated RHP Luis Medina from the 60-day injured list.
June 3	Optioned LHP Brady Basso to Las Vegas Aviators.
June 4	Sent RHP Aaron Brooks outright to Las Vegas Aviators. Activated LHP Sean Newcomb from the 60-day injured list. Selected the contract of RHP Vinny Nittoli from Las Vegas Aviators. Signed free agent LHP Wei-En Lin to a minor league contract.
June 5	Activated RHP Joe Boyle from the 15-day injured list. Optioned RHP Joe Boyle to Las Vegas Aviators.
June 9	Transferred LHP Alex Wood (left rotator cuff tendonitis) from the 15-day injured list to the 60-day injured list. Optioned LHP Jack O'Laughlin to Las Vegas Aviators. Selected the contract of RHP Michel Otañez from Las Vegas Aviators.
June 12	Activated RHP Lucas Erceg from the 15-day injured list. Optioned RHP Michel Otañez to Las Vegas Aviators. Signed free agent RHP Norge Vera from the Chicago White Sox to a minor league contract.
June 16	Recalled LHP Brady Basso from Las Vegas Aviators.
June 17	Optioned LHP Brady Basso to Las Vegas Aviators.
June 18	Designated 3B J. D. Davis for assignment. Selected the contract of 3B Tyler Nevin from Las Vegas Aviators. Sent RF Seth Brown outright to Las Vegas Aviators. Recalled 1B Lawrence Butler from Las Vegas Aviators.
June 21	Designated RHP Vinny Nittoli for assignment. Recalled RHP Osvaldo Bido from Las Vegas Aviators.
June 22	Placed 3B Abraham Toro (strained right hamstring) on the 10-day injured list. Selected the contract of 3B Armando Álvarez from Las Vegas Aviators.
June 23	Traded 3B J. D. Davis and cash to the New York Yankees for Jordan Groshans. Selected the contract of RHP Aaron Brooks from Las Vegas Aviators.
June 25	Designated RHP Aaron Brooks for assignment. Recalled LHP Jack O'Loughlin from Las Vegas Aviators.
June 27	Sent RHP Aaron Brooks outright to Las Vegas Aviators.

==== July 2024 ====
July 2	Designated LHP Sean Newcomb for assignment. Designated SS Aledmys Díaz for assignment. Recalled RHP Tyler Ferguson from Las Vegas Aviators. Recalled 3B Brett Harris from Las Vegas Aviators.
July 5	Released LHP Sean Newcomb. Released SS Aledmys Díaz.
July 6	Sent LHP Kyle Muller on a rehab assignment to Stockton Ports.
July 7	Activated LHP Kyle Muller from the 15-day injured list. Optioned LHP Jack O'Loughlin to Las Vegas Aviators.
July 9	Placed LHP Hogan Harris on the paternity list. Recalled RHP Michel Otañez from Las Vegas Aviators. Sent RHP Ross Stripling on a rehab assignment to Stockton Ports. Sent RHP Paul Blackburn on a rehab assignment to Stockton Ports. Sent 2B Esteury Ruiz on a rehab assignment to Stockton Ports.
July 11	Placed C Tyler Soderstrom (left wrist bone bruise) on the 10-day injured list retroactive to July 10. Selected the contract of RF Seth Brown from Las Vegas Aviators.
July 12	Activated LHP Hogan Harris from the paternity list. Optioned RHP Michel Otañez to Las Vegas Aviators.
July 13	Placed RHP Luis Medina (right elbow sprain) on the 15-day injured list. Recalled RHP Michel Otañez from Las Vegas Aviators.
July 14	Sent RHP Ross Stripling on a rehab assignment to Las Vegas Aviators. Sent RHP Paul Blackburn on a rehab assignment to Las Vegas Aviators.
July 15	Sent 3B Abraham Toro on a rehab assignment to ACL Athletics.
July 16	Sent 2B Esteury Ruiz on a rehab assignment to ACL Athletics.
July 17	Optioned 3B Armando Alvarez to Las Vegas Aviators.
July 19	Selected the contract of SS Jacob Wilson from Las Vegas Aviators. Sent SS Darell Hernáiz on a rehab assignment to Las Vegas Aviators. Sent 3B Abraham Toro on a rehab assignment to Las Vegas Aviators.
July 21	Placed SS Jacob Wilson (strained left hamstring) on the 10-day injured list. Activated 3B Abraham Toro from the 10-day injured list.
July 22	Signed 1B Nick Kurtz.
July 23	Signed 3B Tommy White.
July 24	Signed free agent C Thomas Takayoshi from Edmonton Riverhawks of the West Coast League to a minor league contract. Signed free agent OF Cesar Franco from Bismarck Larks of the Northwoods League.
July 25	Placed RHP Mason Miller (broken left hand) on the 15-day injured list. Activated RHP Ross Stripling from the 60-day injured list. Signed RHP Aidan Layton. Signed C Dylan Fien. Signed SS Joshua Kuroda-Grauer. Signed LHP Gage Jump. Signed RHP Blake Hammond. Signed OF Cameron Leary. Signed SS Ali Camarillo. Signed RHP Kyle Robinson. Signed LHP Riley Huge. Signed RHP Josiah Romeo. Signed LHP Ryan Madgic. Signed OF Rodney Green. Signed LHP Tucker Novotny. Signed 3B Jared Sprague-Lott. Signed RHP Connor Spencer. Signed RHP Sam Stuhr.
July 26	Activated RHP Paul Blackburn from the 60-day injured list. Optioned LHP Hogan Harris to Las Vegas Aviators.
July 30	Traded RHP Lucas Erceg to Kansas City Royals for RHP Will Klein, RHP Mason Barnett and OF Jared Dickey. Traded RHP Paul Blackburn to New York Mets for RHP Kade Morris. Selected the contract of RHP Gerardo Reyes from Las Vegas Aviators.
July 31	Activated RHP Will Klein.

==== August 2024 ====
August 2	Activated SS Darell Hernáiz from the 60-day injured list. Optioned 3B Brett Harris to Las Vegas Aviators. Transferred RHP Luis Medina (right elbow sprain) from the 15-day injured list to the 60-day injured list.
August 6	Sent RHP Dany Jiménez on a rehab assignment to Las Vegas Aviators.
August 7	Placed RF Seth Brown on the paternity list. Designated RHP Gerardo Reyes for assignment. Activated RHP Mason Miller from the 15-day injured list. Recalled 3B Armando Alvarez from Las Vegas Aviators.
August 9	Sent RHP Gerardo Reyes outright to Las Vegas Aviators.
August 10	Activated RF Seth Brown from the paternity list. Sent 3B Armando Alvarez to Las Vegas Aviators.
August 13	Designated LHP Kyle Muller for assignment. Recalled RHP Joe Boyle from Las Vegas Aviators.
August 14	Placed OF Brent Rooker on the paternity list. Recalled 3B Armando Alvarez from Las Vegas Aviators. Sent LHP Kyle Muller outright to Las Vegas Aviators.
August 17	Activated OF Brent Rooker from the paternity list. Optioned 3B Armando Alvarez to Las Vegas Aviators. Selected the contract of RHP Grant Holman from Las Vegas Aviators. Optioned RHP Will Klein to Las Vegas Aviators. Sent SS Jacob Wilson on a rehab assignment to Las Vegas Aviators.
August 18	Placed RHP Austin Adams (right forearm tendinitis) on the 15-day injured list. Activated RHP Dany Jiménez from the 15-day injured list.
August 20	Placed LHP Scott Alexander (left rotator cuff tendonitis) on the 15-day injured list retroactive to August 18. Selected the contract of RHP J.T. Ginn from Las Vegas Aviators. Signed free agent RHP Austin Pruitt from the Texas Rangers to a minor league contract.
August 22	Signed free agent RHP Lincoln Henzman from the Baltimore Orioles to a minor league contract.
August 24	Optioned RHP Dany Jiménez to Las Vegas Aviators. Recalled LHP Hogan Harris from Las Vegas Aviators.
August 26	Optioned SS Darell Hernáiz to Las Vegas Aviators.
August 27	Designated 3B Abraham Toro for assignment. Activated SS Jacob Wilson from the 10-day injured list. Claimed SS Tristan Gray off waivers from Miami Marlins. Recalled 3B Armando Alvarez from Las Vegas Aviators.
August 28	Placed 3B Miguel Andújar (core muscle injury) on the 10-day injured list retroactive to August 25. Recalled SS Nick Allen. Sent 3B Abraham Toro outright to Las Vegas Aviators.
August 31	Transferred 3B Miguel Andújar (core muscle injury) from the 10-day injured list to the 60-day injured list. Claimed RHP Janson Junk off waivers from Houston Astros.

==== September 2024 ====
September 1	Activated RHP Janson Junk. Recalled SS Tristan Gray from Las Vegas Aviators.
September 4	Activated LHP Scott Alexander from the 15-day injured list. Placed LF Esteury Ruiz (strained left wrist) on the 60-day injured list. Claimed 3B CJ Alexander off waivers from Kansas City Royals. Optioned RHP Joe Boyle to Las Vegas Aviators. Optioned 3B CJ Alexander to Las Vegas Aviators.
September 5	Designated RHP Janson Junk for assignment. Recalled LHP Brady Basso from Las Vegas Aviators.
September 7	Sent RHP Janson Junk outright to Las Vegas Aviators.
September 8	Optioned LHP Brady Basso to Las Vegas Aviators. Selected the contract of RHP Brandon Bielak from Las Vegas Aviators.
September 10	Placed RHP Osvaldo Bido (right wrist flexor tendinitis) on the 15-day injured list retroactive to September 8. Optioned 3B Tristan Gray to Las Vegas Aviators. Recalled 1B Ryan Noda from Las Vegas Aviators. Recalled LHP Brady Basso from Las Vegas Aviators.
September 11	Designated LHP Jack O'Loughlin for assignment. Placed RHP Ross Stripling (lower back pain) on the 15-day injured list retroactive to September 9. Selected the contract of LHP Kyle Muller from Las Vegas Aviators.
September 13	Sent LHP Jack O'Loughlin outright to Las Vegas Aviators.
September 14	Optioned 3B Armando Alvarez to Las Vegas Aviators. Activated 1B Tyler Soderstrom from the 10-day injured list.
September 22	Designated RHP Brandon Bielak for assignment. Recalled RHP Joe Boyle from Las Vegas Aviators.
September 24	Recalled SS Darell Hernáiz from Las Vegas Aviators. Optioned 1B Ryan Noda to Midland RockHounds.
September 25	Sent RHP Brandon Bielak outright to Las Vegas Aviators.
September 27	Activated RHP Ross Stripling from the 15-day injured list. Optioned LHP Brady Basso to ACL Athletics.

== Roster ==
2024 Oakland Athletics
Roster
Pitchers: 29 Austin Adams; 54 Scott Alexander; 66 Brady Basso; 45 Osvaldo Bido; 37,62 Brandon Bielak; 58 Paul Blackburn; 35 Joe Boyle; 53 Aaron Brooks; 70 Lucas Erceg; 68 Joey Estes; 65 Tyler Ferguson; 70 J. T. Ginn; 63 Hogan Harris; 67 Grant Holman; 56 Dany Jiménez; 60 Janson Junk; 47 Michael Kelly; 64 Will Klein; 67 Easton Lucas; 48 T. J. McFarland; 46 Luis Medina; 19 Mason Miller; 39 Kyle Muller; 16 Sean Newcomb; 64 Vinny Nittoli; 37 Jack O'Loughlin; 47 Michel Otañez; 92 Gerardo Reyes; 38 JP Sears; 40 Mitch Spence; 36 Ross Stripling; 57 Alex Wood	Catchers: 23 Shea Langeliers; 52 Kyle McCann; Infielders: 10 Nick Allen; 50 Armando Alvarez; 5 J. D. Davis; 6 Aledmys Díaz; 20 Zack Gelof; 16 Tristan Gray; 77 Brett Harris; 2 Darell Hernáiz; 26 Tyler Nevin; 49 Ryan Noda; 12 Max Schuemann; 21 Tyler Soderstrom; 31 Abraham Toro; 5 Jacob Wilson	Outfielders: 22 Miguel Andújar; 33 JJ Bleday; 15 Seth Brown; 4 Lawrence Butler; 28 Daz Cameron; 25 Brent Rooker; 1 Esteury Ruiz	Manager: 7 Mark Kotsay; Coaches: 18 Mike Aldrete (hitting); 51 Darren Bush (bench); 90 Wilkin Castillo (bullpen catcher); 41 Chris Cron (assistant hitting); 8 Bobby Crosby (first base); 14 Scott Emerson (pitching); 88 Ramón Hernández (coach and interpreter); 71 Dan Hubbs (bullpen); 91 Dustin Hughes (bullpen catcher); 59 Marcus Jensen (quality control); 3 Eric Martins (third base)

== Player stats ==
= Indicates team leader

=== Batting ===
Note: G = Games played; AB = At bats; R = Runs scored; H = Hits; 2B = Doubles; 3B = Triples; HR = Home runs; RBI = Runs batted in; SB = Stolen bases; BB = Walks; AVG = Batting average; SLG = Slugging average

Player	G	AB	R	H	2B	3B	HR	RBI	SB	BB	AVG	SLG
JJ Bleday	159	572	74	139	43	4	20	60	2	67	.243	.437
Brent Rooker	145	546	82	160	26	2	39	112	11	59	.293	.562
Zack Gelof	138	497	60	105	20	2	17	49	25	38	.211	.362
Shea Langeliers	137	482	58	108	18	2	29	80	4	41	.224	.450
Lawrence Butler	125	412	63	108	24	2	22	57	18	35	.262	.490
Max Schuemann	133	396	55	87	14	0	7	34	14	47	.220	.308
Seth Brown	124	372	32	86	11	1	14	44	4	25	.231	.379
Abraham Toro	94	337	34	81	17	1	6	26	4	20	.240	.350
Miguel Andújar	75	302	31	86	14	1	4	30	3	13	.285	.377
Tyler Nevin	87	245	22	50	10	0	7	20	1	25	.204	.331
Tyler Soderstrom	61	189	18	44	10	0	9	26	0	20	.233	.429
Daz Cameron	66	170	22	34	5	1	5	15	5	13	.200	.329
Kyle McCann	54	140	13	33	4	0	5	15	0	16	.236	.371
J. D. Davis	39	123	12	29	4	0	4	5	0	9	.236	.366
Darell Hernáiz	48	120	8	23	3	0	1	12	1	11	.192	.242
Brett Harris	36	103	15	15	3	0	3	12	0	17	.146	.262
Nick Allen	41	97	6	17	4	0	1	4	0	5	.175	.247
Ryan Noda	36	95	8	13	4	0	1	4	0	14	.137	.211
Jacob Wilson	28	92	11	23	2	2	0	3	0	8	.250	.315
Esteury Ruiz	29	55	10	11	2	1	2	8	5	4	.200	.382
Armando Alvarez	16	37	7	9	1	0	0	2	1	2	.243	.270
Aledmys Díaz	12	29	2	3	0	0	0	1	0	1	.103	.103
Tristan Gray	8	21	0	3	1	0	0	0	0	3	.143	.190
Team totals	162	5432	643	1267	240	19	196	619	98	493	.233	.393

Source:Baseball Reference

=== Pitching ===
Note: W = Wins; L = Losses; ERA = Earned run average; G = Games pitched; GS = Games started; SV = Saves; IP = Innings pitched; H = Hits allowed; R = Runs allowed; ER = Earned runs allowed; BB = Walks allowed; SO = Strikeouts

Player	W	L	ERA	G	GS	SV	IP	H	R	ER	BB	SO
JP Sears	11	13	4.38	32	32	0	180.2	172	93	88	49	137
Mitch Spence	8	10	4.58	35	24	0	151.1	165	79	77	44	126
Joey Estes	7	9	5.01	25	24	0	127.2	130	73	71	27	92
Ross Stripling	2	11	6.01	22	14	0	85.1	109	65	57	22	49
Hogan Harris	4	4	2.86	21	9	0	72.1	65	29	23	33	61
Mason Miller	2	2	2.49	55	0	28	65.0	36	23	18	21	104
Osvaldo Bido	5	3	3.41	16	9	0	63.1	43	25	24	26	63
T. J. McFarland	2	4	3.81	79	0	0	56.2	53	28	24	17	39
Tyler Ferguson	4	2	3.68	48	0	2	51.1	32	23	21	24	62
Paul Blackburn	4	2	4.41	9	9	0	51.0	45	25	25	14	38
Kyle Muller	0	1	4.01	21	0	0	49.1	48	25	22	10	36
Joe Boyle	3	6	6.42	13	10	0	47.2	42	35	34	40	56
Austin Adams	1	2	3.92	56	0	0	41.1	38	20	18	23	53
Luis Medina	2	4	5.18	8	8	0	40.0	43	24	23	20	32
Alex Wood	1	3	5.26	9	9	0	39.1	51	27	23	19	33
Scott Alexander	1	3	2.56	45	0	0	38.2	31	14	11	15	31
Lucas Erceg	2	3	3.68	38	0	3	36.2	31	17	15	13	41
Michel Otañez	1	0	3.44	36	0	1	34.0	27	15	13	20	55
J. T. Ginn	1	1	4.24	8	6	0	34.0	36	16	16	9	29
Michael Kelly	3	2	2.59	28	0	0	31.1	27	11	9	10	22
Aaron Brooks	0	2	5.06	5	4	0	26.2	33	19	15	8	12
Dany Jiménez	1	3	4.91	25	0	1	25.2	21	18	14	19	25
Brady Basso	1	1	4.03	7	4	0	22.1	23	10	10	5	19
Grant Holman	1	1	4.02	18	0	0	15.2	17	8	7	9	16
Brandon Bielak	1	0	4.38	6	0	0	12.1	17	6	6	6	5
Sean Newcomb	1	0	6.30	7	0	0	10.0	9	7	7	8	7
Jack O'Loughlin	0	0	4.66	4	0	0	9.2	13	5	5	5	6
Vinny Nittoli	0	1	2.25	7	0	0	8.0	8	2	2	2	5
Gerardo Reyes	0	0	4.50	3	0	0	4.0	4	3	2	3	2
Easton Lucas	0	0	14.73	3	0	0	3.2	8	7	6	3	6
Will Klein	0	0	27.00	3	0	0	1.2	2	5	5	4	1
Janson Junk	0	0	inf	1	0	0	0.0	6	7	7	2	0
Team totals	69	93	4.37	162	162	35	1436.2	1385	764	698	530	1263

Source:Baseball Reference

== Farm system ==
Level	Team	League	Division	Manager	Record
AAA	Las Vegas Aviators	Pacific Coast League	West	Fran Riordan	74–75 (.497)
AA	Midland RockHounds	Texas League	South	Gregorio Petit	44–25 (.638)
High-A	Lansing Lugnuts	Midwest League	East	Craig Conklin	27–39 (.409)
Low-A	Stockton Ports	California League	North	Javier Godard	20–46 (.303)
Rookie	ACL Athletics	Arizona Complex League	East	Tim Esmay	0–0 (–)
Rookie	DSL Athletics	Dominican Summer League	Northwest	Cooper Goldby	0–0 (–)
