= Kyle McCann =

American baseball player (born 1997)

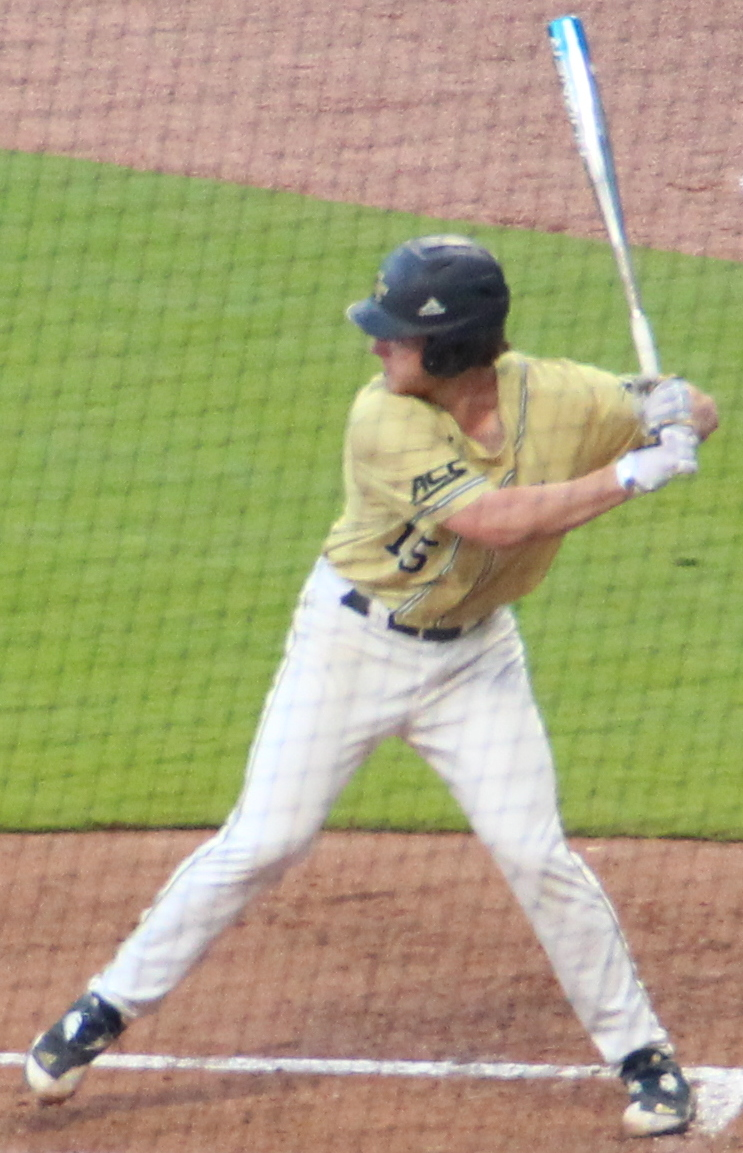
- McCann at Georgia Tech in 2017

Free agent
- Catcher
- Born: December 2, 1997 (age 28); Atlanta, Georgia, U.S.
- Bats: Left Throws: Right

MLB debut
- March 30, 2024, for the Oakland Athletics

MLB statistics (through 2024 season)
- Batting average: .236
- Home runs: 5
- Runs batted in: 15
- Stats at Baseball Reference

Teams
- Oakland Athletics (2024)

Kyle Joseph McCann (born December 2, 1997) is an American professional baseball catcher and first baseman who is a free agent. He has previously played in Major League Baseball (MLB) for the Oakland Athletics. He was drafted in the fourth round of the 2019 MLB draft by Oakland after three seasons at Georgia Tech. Following his junior season, Baseball America named him a second team All-American as a designated hitter. He was also named all-ACC first team catcher.

== Amateur career ==
McCann attended Lambert High School in Suwanee, Georgia, and Georgia Institute of Technology. He played college baseball for the Georgia Tech Yellow Jackets from 2017 through 2019. During his first two seasons at Georgia Tech, he played first base as Joey Bart was already established at catcher. Following his sophomore season, he was named to the all-ACC third team. Following the 2018 season, he played collegiate summer baseball for the Chatham Anglers in the Cape Cod Baseball League. For the 2019 season, he moved to catcher was subsequently named to the all-ACC first team and a second-team All-American by Baseball America. He was also one of three finalists for the Buster Posey Award, which honors best catcher in NCAA Division I.

== Professional career ==
=== Oakland Athletics ===
==== Minor leagues ====
The Oakland Athletics selected McCann in the fourth round of the 2019 Major League Baseball draft. After he signed, the Athletics assigned him to Vermont Lake Monsters. Appearing in 55 games, McCann hit only .192. In five games with the Arizona Complex League Athletics, he hit two home runs with .400 average. Following the cancellation of the 2020 minor league season due to the COVID-19 pandemic, McCann was named to the A's 60 player training pool.

To start his first full professional season in 2021, McCann was assigned to the Double A Midland RockHounds, where he hit .166 over 93 games at both first base and catcher. In 2022, he spent most of the season at Midland but also appeared in 7 games for the Triple-A Las Vegas Aviators. He hit 21 home runs while batting .234 for the season across both teams. In 2023, McCann was a non-roster invitee to the team's spring training. During that time, observers noted that McCann had significantly improved from the prior season, with the San Francisco Chronicle calling McCann "the A's most improved player in spring training." He was believed to be the most likely back-up catcher on the main roster before being leapfrogged during the final week of spring training by veteran Carlos Perez. He subsequently played the entire season in Las Vegas, hitting .270 with 17 home runs in 97 games. Defensively, he played primarily at catcher (60 games) while making 10 appearances at first base. He also appeared in 27 games at designated hitter. He spent much of the year sharing catching duties with top prospect Tyler Soderstrom.

==== Major leagues ====
In 2024, McCann was again a non-roster invitee to the spring training roster competing for a back-up spot behind Shea Langeliers. On March 28, the Athletics selected his contract and added him to their Opening Day roster. In his MLB debut on March 30, McCann went 0-for-2 in four plate appearances, walking twice. He also drove in a run and struck out twice. In 54 games during his rookie campaign, McCann batted .236/.318/.371 with five home runs and 15 RBI. He was designated for assignment by the Athletics following the acquisition of Jhonny Pereda on January 30, 2025. McCann cleared waivers and was sent outright to Triple-A Las Vegas on February 5. He was released by the organization on March 23.

=== Piratas de Campeche ===
On May 9, 2025, McCann signed with the Piratas de Campeche of the Mexican League. McCann made 32 appearances for Campeche, slashing .319/.450/.611 with eight home runs and 34 RBI.

=== Colorado Rockies ===
On February 3, 2026, McCann signed a minor league contract with the Colorado Rockies. He made 39 appearances split between the rookie–level Arizona Complex League Rockies and Triple–A Albuquerque Isotopes, batting a cumulative .195/.307/.305 with three home runs and 15 RBI. McCann was released by the Rockies organization on July 31.
