= Royber Salinas =

Venezuelan baseball player (born 2001)

Marineros de Carabobo – No. 47
- Pitcher
- Born: April 10, 2001 (age 25); Guarenas, Venezuela
- Bats: Right Throws: Right

Royber Adrian Salinas (born April 10, 2001) is a Venezuelan professional baseball pitcher for the Marineros de Carabobo of the Venezuelan Major League.

== Career ==
=== Atlanta Braves ===
Salinas signed with the Atlanta Braves as an international free agent on October 9, 2018. He made his professional debut in 2019 with the Dominican Summer League Braves.

Salinas did not play in a game in 2020 due to the cancellation of the minor league season because of the COVID-19 pandemic. He returned in 2021 to pitch for the rookie–level Florida Complex League Braves and Augusta GreenJackets. He pitched 2022 with Augusta and Rome Braves.

=== Oakland Athletics ===
On December 12, 2022, Salinas was traded to the Oakland Athletics with Kyle Muller, Manny Pina, and Freddy Tarnok. He made 18 appearances (16 starts) for the Double–A Midland RockHounds, posting a 5.48 ERA with 89 strikeouts across 67 1/3 innings pitched. On November 14, 2023, the Athletics added Salinas to their 40-man roster to protect him from the Rule 5 draft. He was optioned to the Triple–A Las Vegas Aviators to begin the 2024 season. In 10 starts split between Midland and Las Vegas, Salinas compiled a 3–1 record and 4.60 ERA with 50 strikeouts across 43 innings pitched.

=== Atlanta Braves (second stint) ===
On November 1, 2024, Salinas was claimed off waivers by the Atlanta Braves. However on November 22, the Braves non–tendered Salinas, making him a free agent. Salinas re–signed with the Braves on a minor league contract on November 26. In seven appearances (two starts) split between the rookie-level Florida Complex League Braves and High-A Rome Emperors, he accumulated a 4.70 ERA with seven strikeouts over 7 2/3 innings of work. Salinas was released by the Braves organization on July 12, 2025.

=== Marineros de Carabobo ===
On April 27, 2026, Salinas signed with the Marineros de Carabobo of the Venezuelan Major League.
