= Brady Basso =

American baseball player (born 1997)

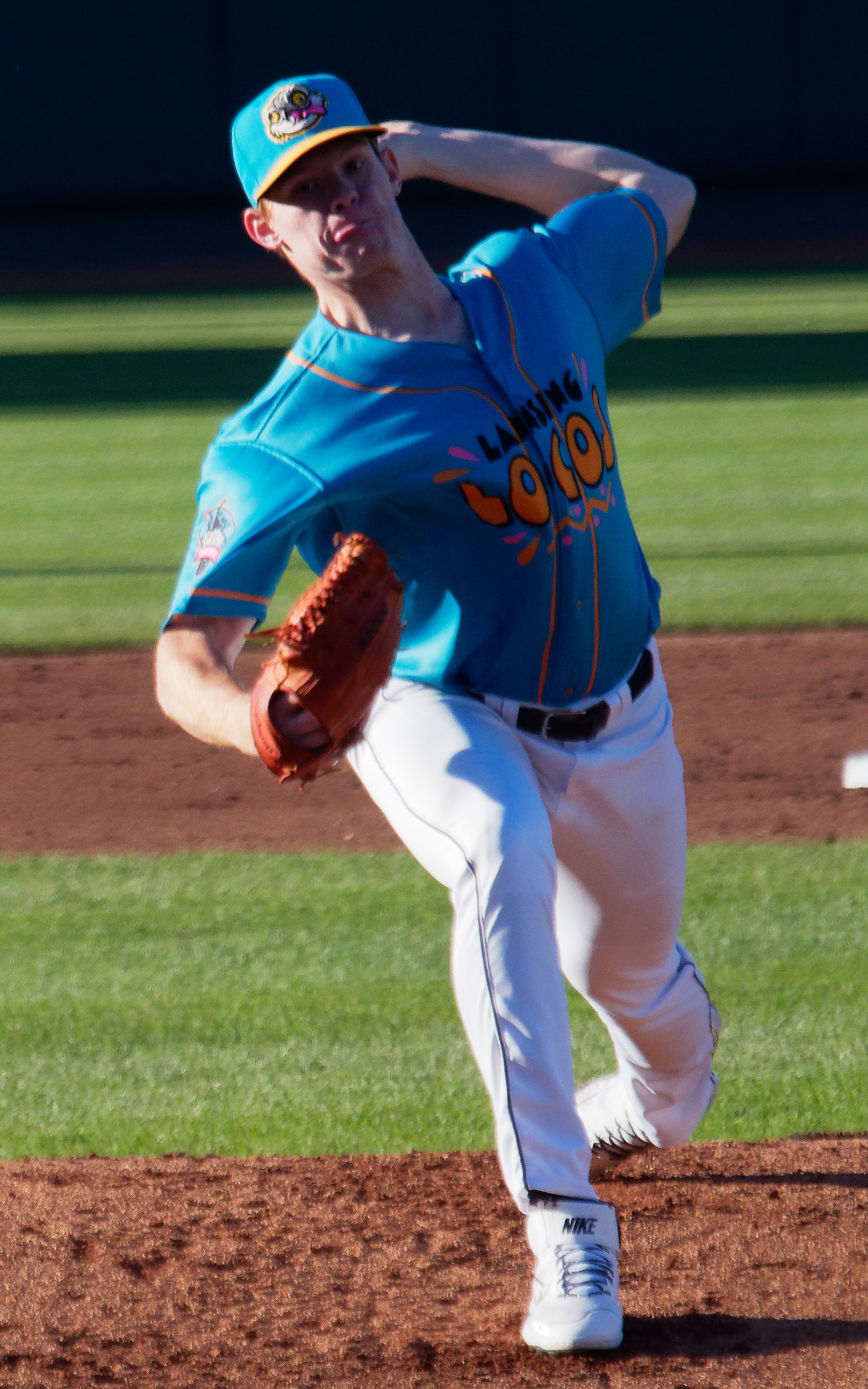
- Basso with the Lansing Lugnuts in 2021

Athletics – No. 66
- Pitcher
- Born: October 8, 1997 (age 28); Pearland, Texas, U.S.
- Bats: Right Throws: Left

MLB debut
- May 31, 2024, for the Oakland Athletics

MLB statistics (through 2026 season)
- Win–loss record: 3–6
- Earned run average: 4.91
- Strikeouts: 58
- Stats at Baseball Reference

Teams
- Oakland Athletics / Athletics (2024–present)

Brady Marshall Basso (born October 8, 1997) is an American professional baseball pitcher for the Athletics of Major League Baseball (MLB). He made his MLB debut in 2024.

== Amateur career ==
A native of Pearland, Texas, Basso attended Pearland High School and Oklahoma State University-Stillwater, where he played college baseball for the Oklahoma State Cowboys. In 2018, he played collegiate summer baseball with the Brewster Whitecaps of the Cape Cod Baseball League.

== Professional career ==
The Oakland Athletics selected Basso in the 16th round, with the 494th overall selection, of the 2019 Major League Baseball draft. He made his professional debut with the rookie–level Arizona League Athletics, logging a 1.75 ERA across 15 appearances. Basso did not play in a game in 2020 due to the cancellation of the minor league season because of the COVID-19 pandemic.

Basso spent the 2021 campaign with the High–A Lansing Lugnuts, registering a 4.71 ERA with 26 strikeouts across 7 appearances (4 starts). He underwent Tommy John surgery in June 2021, causing him to miss the remainder of the season and the entirety of the 2022 season as a result. Basso returned from injury in 2023, splitting the year between Lansing and the Double–A Midland RockHounds. In 20 appearances (17 starts) between the two affiliates, he accumulated a 2.42 ERA with 64 strikeouts across 63 1/3 innings pitched.

On November 15, 2023, the Athletics added Basso to their 40-man roster to protect him from the Rule 5 draft. He was optioned to the Triple–A Las Vegas Aviators to begin the 2024 season. On May 14, 2024, Basso was promoted to the major leagues for the first time. However, he did not appear for Oakland and was optioned down to Las Vegas the next day. On May 31, Basso was recalled to the majors following an injury to Lucas Erceg. He made his MLB debut later that day against the Atlanta Braves, pitching a scoreless inning in relief and recording his first career strikeout against Marcell Ozuna. In 7 games (4 starts) during his rookie campaign, Basso compiled a 1-1 record and 4.03 ERA with 19 strikeouts across 22 1/3 innings pitched.

On March 5, 2025, it was announced that Basso would be shut down after suffering a shoulder strain during a spring training outing. On April 7, he was transferred to the 60-day injured list. Basso was activated from the IL on August 11. He made 11 appearances for the team, posting a 1-1 record and 2.31 ERA with eight strikeouts across 11 2/3 innings pitched.

Basso was optioned to Triple-A Las Vegas to begin the 2026 season.
