= Darell Hernáiz =

Puerto Rican baseball player (born 2001)

Athletics – No. 2
- Infielder
- Born: August 3, 2001 (age 25); San Juan, Puerto Rico
- Bats: Right Throws: Right

MLB debut
- March 28, 2024, for the Oakland Athletics

MLB statistics (through 2026 season)
- Batting average: .221
- Home runs: 4
- Runs batted in: 37
- Stats at Baseball Reference

Teams
- Oakland Athletics / Athletics (2024–present)

Darell Giovan Hernáiz (born August 3, 2001) is a Puerto Rican professional baseball infielder for the Athletics of Major League Baseball. He made his MLB debut in 2024.

== Career ==
=== Baltimore Orioles ===
Hernáiz attended Americas High School in El Paso, Texas. He was drafted by the Baltimore Orioles in the fifth round of the 2019 Major League Baseball draft. He made his professional debut that year with the Gulf Coast Orioles.

Hernáiz did not play for a team in 2020 due to the Minor League Baseball season being cancelled because of the COVID-19 pandemic. He returned in 2021 to play for the Delmarva Shorebirds. He started the 2022 season with Delmarva before being promoted to the Aberdeen IronBirds.

=== Oakland Athletics / Athletics ===
On January 26, 2023, the Orioles traded Hernáiz to the Oakland Athletics in exchange for pitchers Kyle Virbitsky and Cole Irvin. He split the season between the Double–A Midland RockHounds and Triple–A Las Vegas Aviators, playing in 131 games and hitting .321/.386/.456 with nine home runs, 71 RBI, and 13 stolen bases. On November 14, 2023, the Athletics added Hernáiz to their 40-man roster to protect him from the Rule 5 draft.

On March 26, 2024, manager Mark Kotsay announced that Hernáiz had made the team's Opening Day roster. He made his MLB debut on Opening Day, March 28. After going 3-29 (.103 batting average) to start the season, Hernáiz was optioned back to Triple-A Las Vegas on April 18. He was recalled a week later after fellow infielder Zack Gelof was added to the injury list. In a May 7 game against the Texas Rangers, Hernáiz was removed early after stepping awkwardly on first base while attempting to beat out a ground ball. He was subsequently diagnosed with a severe left ankle sprain, and was placed on the 60–day injured list on May 15. Hernáiz was activated on August 2. In 48 total appearances during his rookie campaign, Hernáiz batted .192/.261/.242 with one home run, 12 RBI, and one stolen base.

Hernáiz was optioned to Triple-A Las Vegas to begin the 2025 season. Hernáiz made 53 appearances for the Athletics during the year, slashing .231/.292/.306 with two home runs, 16 RBI, and three stolen bases. He played in 56 games for the team in 2026, batting .234/.316/.277 with one home run, nine RBI, and three stolen bases.
