= Lázaro Armenteros =

Cuban baseball player (born 1999)

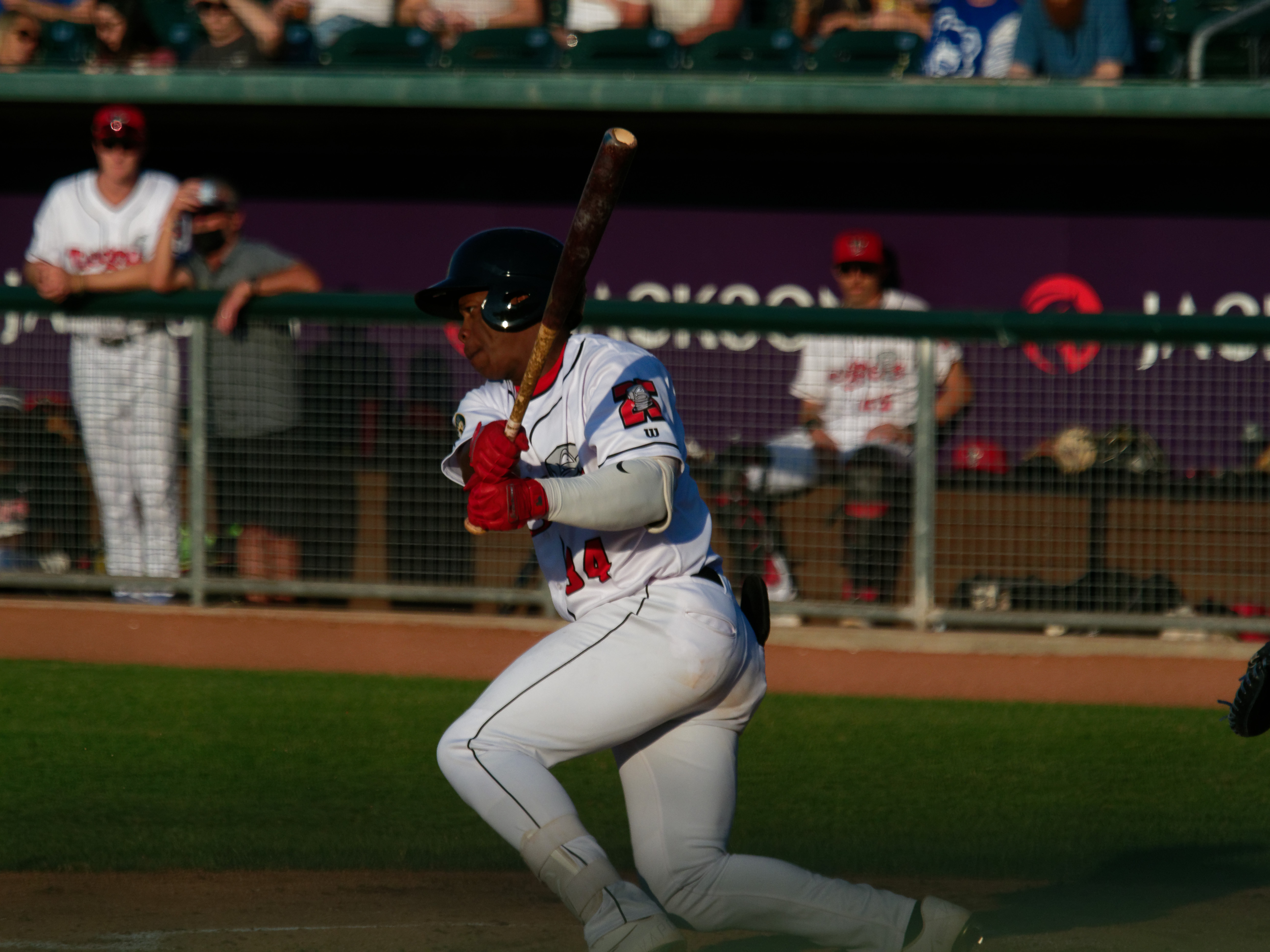
- Armenteros with the Lansing Lugnuts in 2021

Senadores de Caracas – No. 31
- Outfielder
- Born: 22 May 1999 (age 27); Havana, Cuba
- Bats: Right Throws: Right
- Stats at Baseball Reference
Medals
Men's baseball
Representing Cuba
U-15 Baseball World Cup
Gold medal – first place	2014 Mazatlán	Team

Lázaro Robersy Armenteros Arango (born 22 May 1999), nicknamed Lazarito, is a Cuban professional baseball outfielder for the Senadores de Caracas of the Venezuelan Major League.

== Career ==
=== Amateur ===
Armenteros played in the 2014 15U Baseball World Cup, held in Mexico, and made the All-Tournament Team after batting .462 in nine games.

In 2015, Armenteros was sanctioned by the Cuban government, and disallowed from playing for the 15-and-under team. Armenteros defected from Cuba in an attempt to play in Major League Baseball. He reached Haiti, and established residency there in May 2015. He permanently settled in the Dominican Republic. A team in Nippon Professional Baseball reportedly offered Armenteros a contract worth $15 million. In January 2016, Armenteros was declared a free agent.

=== Oakland Athletics ===
On 2 July 2016, Armenteros signed a minor league contract with the Oakland Athletics. He made his American professional baseball debut in 2017 with both the DSL Athletics and AZL Athletics, slashing .276/.377/.443 with four home runs, 23 RBIs, and 12 stolen bases in 47 games between the two teams.

The Athletics assigned him to the Beloit Snappers of the Single–A Midwest League in 2018, for whom he batted .277 with 8 home runs and 39 RBI in 79 games. In 2019, Armenteros played in 126 games for High–A Stockton Ports of the California League, hitting .222/.336/.403 with career–highs in home runs (17), RBI (61), and stolen bases (22). In addition, he led the minor leagues in strikeouts, with 227 in 459 at–bats.

Armenteros did not play in a game in 2020 due to the cancellation of the minor league season because of the COVID-19 pandemic. He returned to action in 2021, splitting the year between Stockton and the High–A Lansing Lugnuts. In 71 combined contests, he hit .259/.322/.381 with 6 home runs, 26 RBI, and 21 stolen bases. Armenteros again played for Lansing in 2022, appearing in 56 games and slashing .261/.376/.479 with 10 home runs, 26 RBI, and 13 stolen bases.

Armenteros once more began the 2023 season with Lansing before quickly being promoted to the Double–A Midland RockHounds. In 96 appearances for Midland, he hit .249/.380/.464 with 14 home runs, 72 RBI, and 10 stolen bases. On 6 November, the Athletics added Armenteros to their 40-man roster to prevent him from reaching minor league free agency.

Armenteros was optioned to the Triple–A Las Vegas Aviators to begin the 2024 season. After hitting .133 in 24 games, he was designated for assignment on 7 May 2024. Armenteros cleared waivers and was sent outright to Triple–A on 9 May. He was released by the Athletics organization on 15 July.

=== Kansas City Monarchs ===
On March 17, 2025, Armenteros signed with the Kansas City Monarchs of the American Association of Professional Baseball. In two games for the team, he went 1-for-9 (.111) with one RBI and one stolen base. Armenteros was released by the Monarchs on May 25.

=== Senadores de Caracas ===
On April 28, 2026, Armenteros signed with the Senadores de Caracas of the Venezuelan Major League.

== Personal life ==
Armenteros was born and raised in the San Miguel del Padrón section of Havana. He has three brothers and three sisters. His father, Lazaro Sr., played for the Cuban national basketball team.
