= Wei-En Lin =

Taiwanese baseball player (born 2005)

Athletics
- Pitcher
- Born: November 4, 2005 (age 20); Taoyuan, Taiwan
- Bats: Left Throws: Left
- Stats at Baseball Reference

Wei-En Lin (Chinese: 林維恩; born November 4, 2005) is a Taiwanese professional baseball pitcher in the Athletics organization.

== Career ==
Lin played in the 2018 Little League Baseball Asia Pacific and Middle East Regionals as a student of Taoyuan's Guishan Elementary School and pitched against South Korea and Japan during the 2023 U-18 Baseball World Cup. He faced Spain in the World Baseball Classic 2025 Qualifiers. Lin was rostered for the 2026 World Baseball Classic, during which he faced South Korea in relief.

Lin attended Taoyuan Municipal Ping Jen Senior High School. By his sophomore season, Lin had begun garnering attention from professional scouts. He signed with the Oakland Athletics as an international free agent in June 2024. Lin made his professional debut in 2025 with the Stockton Ports and was promoted to the Lansing Lugnuts during the season. Throughout the season, Lin adjusted the grip on his curveball and opted to abandon his splitter for a Vulcan changeup. In 2026, Lin was invited to spring training. He was subsequently assigned to the Midland RockHounds, and named the team's Opening Day starter. In May, he ranked 93rd on a list of top prospects compiled by Baseball America. Lin was only the second Taiwanese player listed in eighteen years, following Chin-Lung Hu. On June 5, Lin became the youngest Taiwanese player ever promoted to the Triple–A level. Later that month, Lin disclosed that he would undergo ulnar collateral ligament reconstruction.
