= Michel Otañez =

Dominican baseball player (born 1997)

Texas Rangers – No. 58
- Pitcher
- Born: July 3, 1997 (age 29); Villa La Mata, Dominican Republic
- Bats: Right Throws: Right

MLB debut
- June 10, 2024, for the Oakland Athletics

MLB statistics (through 2025 season)
- Win–loss record: 1–0
- Earned run average: 4.81
- Strikeouts: 61
- Stats at Baseball Reference

Teams
- Oakland Athletics / Athletics (2024–2025)

Michel Otañez (born July 3, 1997) is a Dominican professional baseball pitcher for the Texas Rangers of Major League Baseball (MLB). He has previously played in MLB for the Athletics. He made his MLB debut in 2024.

== Career ==
=== New York Mets ===
Otañez signed with the New York Mets as an international free agent on July 2, 2016. He made his professional debut that season with the Dominican Summer League Mets. Otañez missed the entirety of the 2017 season after undergoing Tommy John surgery.

Otañez returned from injury in 2018 with the rookie–level Gulf Coast League Mets, posting a 1–6 record and 7.64 ERA with 33 strikeouts across 11 games (7 starts). In 2019, he made 14 starts split between the rookie–level Kingsport Mets and Low–A Brooklyn Cyclones, accumulating a 4–3 record and 3.14 ERA with 70 strikeouts across 63 innings. Otañez did not play in a game in 2020 due to the cancellation of the minor league season because of the COVID-19 pandemic.

Otañez spent 2021 back with Brooklyn, logging a 5.13 ERA with 58 strikeouts in 35 games. He split the 2022 campaign between the Double–A Binghamton Rumble Ponies and Triple–A Syracuse Mets, pitching to a combined 4.84 ERA with 58 strikeouts and 8 saves across 45 appearances. Otañez elected free agency following the season on November 10, 2022.

=== Arizona Diamondbacks ===
On November 14, 2022, Otañez signed a minor league contract with the Arizona Diamondbacks. In 32 appearances split between the Double–A Amarillo Sod Poodles and Triple–A Reno Aces, he compiled a 6.08 ERA with 61 strikeouts across 37 innings of work. Otañez elected free agency following the season on November 6. On November 14, he re–signed with the Diamondbacks on a new minor league deal, but the contract ultimately fell through.

=== Oakland Athletics / Athletics ===
On December 9, 2023, Otañez signed a minor league contract with the Oakland Athletics organization. In 22 appearances for the Triple–A Las Vegas Aviators, he recorded a 3.99 ERA with 45 strikeouts across 29 1/3 innings pitched. On June 9, 2024, Otañez was selected to the 40-man roster and promoted to the major leagues for the first time. He made his MLB debut the next day. Otañez made 36 appearances for Oakland during his rookie campaign, compiling a 1–0 record and 3.44 ERA with 55 strikeouts and one save over 34 innings of work.

Otañez pitched in six games for the Athletics in 2025, but struggled to a 13.50 ERA with six strikeouts across 5 1/3 innings pitched.

=== Texas Rangers ===
On November 5, 2025, Otañez was claimed off waivers by the Texas Rangers. Otañez was optioned to the Triple-A Round Rock Express to begin the 2026 season. After struggling to a 6.15 ERA across 26 1/3 innings, Otañez was designated for assignment by the Rangers on June 13, 2026. He cleared waivers and was sent outright to Round Rock on June 18. On September 18, Otañez's contract was selected by the Rangers.
