= 2025 Athletics season =

2025 Athletics
- League: American League
- Division: West
- Ballpark: Sutter Health Park
- City: West Sacramento, California
- Record: 76–86 (.469)
- Divisional place: 4th
- Owners: John Fisher
- General managers: David Forst
- Managers: Mark Kotsay
- Television: NBC Sports California
- Radio: KNEW; Athletics Radio Network

The 2025 Athletics season was the 125th season for the Athletics franchise, the 58th year in California, and the franchise's first year in West Sacramento. The team played their home games at Sutter Health Park as part of their temporary relocation following their departure from Oakland, and prior to their planned relocation to the Las Vegas metropolitan area. As part of the franchise's temporary relocation, they were known as simply the Athletics and A's during this period of time. While their home games were being hosted at Sutter Health Park, they were sharing the ballpark with the Sacramento River Cats of the Pacific Coast League. (Note: The franchise's team abbreviation for this season was ATH.)

Although the A's improved on their 69–93 record from 2024, their final season in Oakland, they missed the playoffs for the fifth straight year.

== Offseason ==
=== Temporary relocation to Sacramento ===
The Athletics finished the 2024 season, their final season as the Oakland Athletics, with a 69–93 record, which was a 19 game improvement on their 50–112 record from 2023. The franchise played their final home game as an Oakland based team on September 27, 2024. After moving, the team renamed themselves the Athletics with no city name attached and will play in West Sacramento at Sutter Health Park until at least 2028 pending the completion of a new Las Vegas MLB stadium on the Las Vegas Strip.

=== Transactions ===
==== 2024 ====
- November 8 – Signed LHP T. J. McFarland to a 1-year, $1.8 million contract.
- December 14 – Acquired LHP Jeffrey Springs and LHP Jacob Lopez from the Tampa Bay Rays in exchange for RHP Joe Boyle, 1B Will Simpson, RHP Jacob Watters and a compensatory draft pick.
- December 21 – Signed 3B Gio Urshela to a 1-year contract.

==== 2025 ====
- January 17 – Signed RHP José Leclerc to a 1-year, $10 million contract.

== Season standings ==
=== American League West ===
AL West
Team	W	L	Pct.	GB	Home	Road
Seattle Mariners	90	72	.556	—	51‍–‍30	39‍–‍42
Houston Astros	87	75	.537	3	46‍–‍35	41‍–‍40
Texas Rangers	81	81	.500	9	48‍–‍33	33‍–‍48
Athletics	76	86	.469	14	36‍–‍45	40‍–‍41
Los Angeles Angels	72	90	.444	18	39‍–‍42	33‍–‍48

=== American League Wild Card ===
Division leaders
Team	W	L	Pct.
Toronto Blue Jays	94	68	.580
Seattle Mariners	90	72	.556
Cleveland Guardians	88	74	.543

Wild Card teams (Top 3 teams qualify for postseason)
Team	W	L	Pct.	GB
New York Yankees	94	68	.580	+7
Boston Red Sox	89	73	.549	+2
Detroit Tigers	87	75	.537	—
Houston Astros	87	75	.537	—
Kansas City Royals	82	80	.506	5
Texas Rangers	81	81	.500	6
Tampa Bay Rays	77	85	.475	10
Athletics	76	86	.469	11
Baltimore Orioles	75	87	.463	12
Los Angeles Angels	72	90	.444	15
Minnesota Twins	70	92	.432	17
Chicago White Sox	60	102	.370	27

=== Record vs. opponents ===
==== Record vs. American League ====
2025 American League record Source: MLB Standings Grid – 2025
Team	ATH	BAL	BOS	CWS	CLE	DET	HOU	KC	LAA	MIN	NYY	SEA	TB	TEX	TOR	NL
Athletics	—	4–2	3–3	5–1	2–4	4–2	8–5	4–2	4–9	4–3	2–4	6–7	3–3	5–8	2–5	20–28
Baltimore	2–4	—	5–8	6–0	3–4	1–5	3–4	2–4	5–1	0–6	4–9	5–1	7–6	2–4	6–7	24–24
Boston	3–3	8–5	—	4–3	4–2	2–4	4–2	4–2	1–5	3–3	9–4	3–3	10–3	3–4	5–8	26–22
Chicago	1–5	0–6	3–4	—	2–11	5–8	3–3	3–10	3–3	8–5	1–6	1–5	4–2	2–4	3–3	21–27
Cleveland	4–2	4–3	2–4	11–2	—	8–5	4–2	8–5	3–3	9–4	3–3	2–4	5–2	2–4	3–3	20–28
Detroit	2–4	5–1	4–2	8–5	5–8	—	4–2	9–4	5–2	8–5	4–2	2–4	3–3	2–4	3–4	23–25
Houston	5–8	4–3	2–4	3–3	2–4	2–4	—	3–3	8–5	5–1	3-3	5–8	3–4	7–6	4–2	31–17
Kansas City	2–4	4–2	2–4	10–3	5–8	4–9	3–3	—	3–3	7–6	0–6	3–4	3–3	6-1	4–2	26–22
Los Angeles	9–4	1–5	5–1	3–3	3–3	2–5	5–8	3–3	—	2–4	3–4	4–9	3–3	5–8	2–4	22–26
Minnesota	3–4	6–0	3–3	5–8	4–9	5–8	1–5	6–7	4–2	—	2–4	3–4	3–3	3–3	2–4	20–28
New York	4–2	9–4	4–9	6–1	3–3	2–4	3–3	6–0	4–3	4–2	—	5–1	9–4	4–2	5–8	26–22
Seattle	7–6	1–5	3–3	5–1	4–2	4–2	8–5	4–3	9–4	4–3	1–5	—	3–3	10–3	2–4	25–23
Tampa Bay	3–3	6–7	3–10	2–4	2–5	3–3	4–3	3–3	3–3	3–3	4–9	3–3	—	3–3	7–6	28–20
Texas	8–5	4–2	4–3	4–2	4–2	4–2	6–7	1-6	8–5	3–3	2–4	3–10	3–3	—	2–4	25–23
Toronto	5–2	7–6	8–5	3–3	3–3	4–3	2–4	2–4	4–2	4–2	8–5	4–2	6–7	4–2	—	30–18

Updated with the results of all games through September 28, 2025.

==== Record vs. National League ====
2025 American League record vs. National League Source: MLB Standings
Team	AZ	ATL	CHC	CIN	COL	LAD	MIA	MIL	NYM	PHI	PIT	SD	SF	STL	WSH
Athletics	1–2	2–1	0–3	3–0	2–1	1–2	2–1	1–2	1–2	1–2	1–2	1–2	1–5	1–2	2–1
Baltimore	1–2	3–0	1–2	1–2	2–1	2–1	1–2	1–2	2–1	1–2	3–0	3–0	1–2	1–2	1–5
Boston	1–2	3–3	1–2	2–1	3–0	2–1	2–1	0–3	2–1	1–2	1–2	1–2	1–2	3–0	3–0
Chicago	1–2	1–2	1–5	2–1	2–1	0–3	2–1	1–2	1–2	2–1	3–0	1–2	2–1	0–3	2–1
Cleveland	1–2	0–3	0–3	1–5	2–1	1–2	2–1	2–1	3–0	1–2	3–0	0–3	2–1	0–3	2–1
Detroit	3–0	0–3	2–1	1–2	3–0	0–3	1–2	1–2	1–2	1–2	2–4	2–1	3–0	2–1	1–2
Houston	3–0	2–1	2–1	2–1	4–2	3–0	2–1	1–2	2–1	3–0	2–1	2–1	0–3	1–2	2–1
Kansas City	2–1	2–1	2–1	1–2	3–0	1–2	1–2	1–2	1–2	1–2	3–0	1–2	2–1	3–3	2–1
Los Angeles	2–1	2–1	0–3	1–2	1–2	6–0	1–2	0–3	0–3	2–1	1–2	1–2	2–1	2–1	1–2
Minnesota	1–2	0–3	2–1	1–2	1–2	1–2	1–2	2–4	2–1	1–2	2–1	2–1	3–0	0–3	1–2
New York	1–2	2–1	1–2	1–2	2–1	1–2	0–3	3–0	3–3	1–2	2–1	2–1	1–2	3–0	3–0
Seattle	0–3	2–1	2–1	2–1	3–0	0–3	2–1	1–2	1–2	0–3	3–0	5–1	0–3	3–0	1–2
Tampa Bay	2–1	2–1	1–2	0–3	2–1	1–2	3–3	2–1	3–0	0–3	2–1	3–0	2–1	2–1	3–0
Texas	2–4	3–0	1–2	2–1	3–0	1–2	0–3	3–0	2–1	0–3	2–1	1–2	1–2	2–1	2–1
Toronto	2–1	2–1	2–1	2–1	3–0	1–2	2–1	1–2	0–3	2–4	1–2	3–0	3–0	3–0	3–0

Updated with the results of all games through September 28, 2025.

== Game log ==
Legend
Athletics Win	Athletics Loss	Game postponed / Tie	Eliminated from playoff spot

2025 Game Log
Total: 76–86 (Home: 36–45; Away: 40–41)
March/April: 16–15 (Home: 6–9; Away: 10–6)

#	Date	Opponent	Score	Win	Loss	Save	Stadium (Attendance)	Record	Streak
1	March 27	@ Mariners	2–4	Thornton (1–0)	Leclerc (0–1)	Muñoz (1)	T-Mobile Park (42,871)	0–1	L1
2	March 28	@ Mariners	7–0	Springs (1–0)	Castillo (0–1)	—	T-Mobile Park (25,061)	1–1	W1
3	March 29	@ Mariners	4–2	Bido (1–0)	Miller (0–1)	Miller (1)	T-Mobile Park (35,264)	2–1	W2
4	March 30	@ Mariners	1–2	Woo (1–0)	Sears (0–1)	Muñoz (2)	T-Mobile Park (27,696)	2–2	L1
5	March 31	Cubs	3–18	Brown (1–1)	Estes (0–1)	Rea (1)	Sutter Health Park (12,192)	2–3	L2
6	April 1	Cubs	4–7	Steele (2–1)	Severino (0–1)	Pressly (2)	Sutter Health Park (10,095)	2–4	L3
7	April 2	Cubs	2–10	Taillon (1–1)	Springs (1–1)	—	Sutter Health Park (9,342)	2–5	L4
8	April 4	@ Rockies	6–3 (11)	Murdock (1–0)	Chivilli (0–1)	Miller (2)	Coors Field (48,015)	3–5	W1
9	April 5	@ Rockies	7–4	Sears (1–1)	Márquez (0–1)	Miller (3)	Coors Field (27,599)	4–5	W2
10	April 6	@ Rockies	5–12	Dollander (1–0)	Estes (0–2)	Vodnik (1)	Coors Field (26,207)	4–6	L1
11	April 7	Padres	4–5	King (2–0)	Severino (0–2)	Suárez (5)	Sutter Health Park (9,502)	4–7	L2
12	April 8	Padres	10–4	Springs (2–1)	Cease (1–1)	—	Sutter Health Park (9,018)	5–7	W1
13	April 9	Padres	1–2	Vásquez (1–1)	Bido (1–1)	Suárez (6)	Sutter Health Park (10,553)	5–8	L1
14	April 11	Mets	4–7	Canning (1–1)	Sears (1–2)	Díaz (3)	Sutter Health Park (9,632)	5–9	L2
15	April 12	Mets	3–1	Ginn (1–0)	Peterson (1–1)	Miller (4)	Sutter Health Park (10,133)	6–9	W1
16	April 13	Mets	0–8	Senga (2–1)	Severino (0–3)	—	Sutter Health Park (10,036)	6–10	L1
17	April 15	@ White Sox	12–3	Springs (3–1)	Burke (1–3)	Spence (1)	Rate Field (10,673)	7–10	W1
18	April 16	@ White Sox	3–1	Bido (2–1)	Gilbert (1–1)	Miller (5)	Rate Field (10,411)	8–10	W2
19	April 17	@ White Sox	8–0	Sears (2–2)	Martin (1–2)	—	Rate Field (10,560)	9–10	W3
20	April 18	@ Brewers	3–5	Peralta (2–1)	Ginn (1–1)	Megill (2(	American Family Field (25,008)	9–11	L1
21	April 19	@ Brewers	3–1	Severino (1–3)	Patrick (1–1)	Miller (6)	American Family Field (30,659)	10–11	W1
22	April 20	@ Brewers	1–14	Henderson (1–0)	Springs (3–2)	Alexander (1)	American Family Field (21,512)	10–12	L1
23	April 22	Rangers	5–8	Corbin (2–0)	Bido (2–2)	Jackson (7)	Sutter Health Park (10,059)	10–13	L2
24	April 23	Rangers	5–2	Sears (3–2)	Rocker (1–3)	Miller (7)	Sutter Health Park (9,806)	11–13	W1
25	April 24	Rangers	4–3	Holman (1–0)	Jackson (0–2)	—	Sutter Health Park (9,008)	12–13	W2
26	April 25	White Sox	6–5	Sterner (1–0)	Burke (1–4)	Miller (8)	Sutter Health Park (10,283)	13–13	W3
27	April 26	White Sox	3–10	Cannon (1–3)	Springs (3–3)	—	Sutter Health Park (8,832)	13–14	L1
28	April 27	White Sox	3–2 (10)	Holman (2–0)	Leasure (0–2)	—	Sutter Health Park (9,127)	14–14	W1
29	April 28	@ Rangers	2–1	Sears (4–2)	Corbin (2–1)	Miller (9)	Globe Life Field (19,818)	15–14	W2
30	April 29	@ Rangers	2–15	deGrom (1–1)	Lopez (0–1)	Dunning (1)	Globe Life Field (24,452)	15–15	L1
31	April 30	@ Rangers	7–1	Holman (3–0)	Garcia (1–1)	—	Globe Life Field (19,803)	16–15	W1

May: 7–21 (Home: 3–10; Away: 4–11)

#	Date	Opponent	Score	Win	Loss	Save	Stadium (Attendance)	Record	Streak
32	May 1	@ Rangers	3–0	Springs (4–3)	Mahle (3–1)	Miller (10)	Globe Life Field (30,808)	17–15	W2
33	May 2	@ Marlins	6–1	Hoglund (1–0)	Bellozo (0–2)	—	LoanDepot Park (8,864)	18–15	W2
34	May 3	@ Marlins	6–9	Bachar (2–0)	Miller (0–1)	—	LoanDepot Park (13,543)	18–16	L1
35	May 4	@ Marlins	3–2	Spence (1–0)	Bender (1–2)	Ferguson (1)	LoanDepot Park (17,690)	19–16	W1
36	May 5	Mariners	7–6 (11)	Harris (1–0)	Legumina (2–1)	—	Sutter Health Park (10,257)	20–16	W2
37	May 6	Mariners	3–5	Snider (1–0)	Ferguson (0–1)	Vargas (1)	Sutter Health Park (9,615)	20–17	L1
38	May 7	Mariners	5–6	Bazardo (1–0)	Murdock (0–1)	Muñoz (13)	Sutter Health Park (9,697)	20–18	L2
39	May 9	Yankees	2–10	Warren (2–2)	Bido (2–3)	—	Sutter Health Park (12,049)	20–19	L3
40	May 10	Yankees	11–7	Holman (4–0)	Cruz (1–1)	Miller (11)	Sutter Health Park (12,113)	21–19	W1
41	May 11	Yankees	2–12	Yarbrough (1–0)	Severino (1–4)	—	Sutter Health Park (12,224)	21–20	L1
42	May 13	@ Dodgers	11–1	Springs (5–3)	Knack (2–1)	—	Dodger Stadium (45,161)	22–20	W1
43	May 14	@ Dodgers	3–9	Yamamoto (5–3)	Hoglund (1–1)	—	Dodger Stadium (50,071)	22–21	L1
44	May 15	@ Dodgers	2–19	Wrobleski (1–1)	Bido (2–4)	—	Dodger Stadium (51,272)	22–22	L2
45	May 16	@ Giants	1–9	Webb (5–3)	Sears (4–3)	—	Oracle Park (41,112)	22–23	L3
46	May 17	@ Giants	0–1 (10)	Doval (3–1)	Miller (0–2)	—	Oracle Park (40,448)	22–24	L4
47	May 18	@ Giants	2–3	Rodríguez (3–0)	Ferguson (0–2)	Walker (8)	Oracle Park (40,051)	22–25	L5
48	May 19	Angels	3–4	Soriano (3–4)	Ginn (1–2)	Jansen (9)	Sutter Health Park (10,519)	22–26	L6
49	May 20	Angels	5–7	Hendricks (2–5)	Hoglund (1–2)	Jansen (10)	Sutter Health Park (10,028)	22–27	L7
50	May 21	Angels	5–10	Neris (2–1)	Sears (4–4)	—	Sutter Health Park (10,094)	22–28	L8
51	May 22	Angels	5–10	Strickland (1–0)	Holman (4–1)	—	Sutter Health Park (10,321)	22–29	L9
52	May 23	Phillies	3–4	Wheeler (6–1)	Lopez (0–2)	Banks (1)	Sutter Health Park (10,052)	22–30	L10
53	May 24	Phillies	6–9 (11)	Kerkering (4–1)	Spence (1–1)	Lazar (1)	Sutter Health Park (10,090)	22–31	L11
54	May 25	Phillies	5–4	Ferguson (1–2)	Strahm (1–3)	Miller (12)	Sutter Health Park (10,068)	23–31	W1
55	May 27	@ Astros	1–11	Brown (7–3)	Sears (4–5)	—	Daikin Park (36,143)	23–32	L1
56	May 28	@ Astros	3–5	Dubin (2–0)	Sterner (1–1)	Hader (14)	Daikin Park (25,122)	23–33	L2
57	May 29	@ Blue Jays	0–12	Berríos (2–2)	Lopez (0–3)	—	Rogers Centre (23,853)	23–34	L3
58	May 30	@ Blue Jays	7–11	Bassitt (5–3)	Springs (5–4)	—	Rogers Centre (36,951)	23–35	L4
59	May 31	@ Blue Jays	7–8	Lucas (3–2)	Hoglund (1–3)	Hoffman (13)	Rogers Centre (38,017)	23–36	L5

June: 12–16 (Home: 6–8; Away: 6–8)

#	Date	Opponent	Score	Win	Loss	Save	Stadium (Attendance)	Record	Streak
60	June 1	@ Blue Jays	4–8	Swanson (1–0)	Sterner (1–2)	—	Rogers Centre (30,130)	23–37	L6
61	June 2	Twins	4–10	Ryan (6–2)	Severino (1–5)	—	Sutter Health Park (8,922)	23–38	L7
62	June 3	Twins	3–10	López (5–3)	Lopez (0–3)	—	Sutter Health Park (8,487)	23–39	L8
63	June 4	Twins	1–6	Matthews (1–1)	Sterner (1–3)	—	Sutter Health Park (9,211)	23–40	L9
64	June 5	Twins	14–3	Spence (2–1)	Festa (0–1)	—	Sutter Health Park (8,877)	24–40	W1
65	June 6	Orioles	5–4	Sears (5–5)	Kremer (5–6)	Miller (13)	Sutter Health Park (8,424)	25–40	W2
66	June 7	Orioles	4–7	Akin (1–0)	Severino (1–6)	Bautista (12)	Sutter Health Park (9,185)	25–41	L1
67	June 8	Orioles	5–1	Newcomb (1–4)	Sugano (5–4)	—	Sutter Health Park (8,836)	26–41	W1
68	June 9	@ Angels	4–7	Kikuchi (2–5)	Springs (5–5)	Jansen (15)	Angel Stadium (24,884)	26–42	L1
69	June 10	@ Angels	1–2 (10)	Detmers (2–2)	Harris (1–1)	—	Angel Stadium (27,480)	26–43	L2
70	June 11	@ Angels	5–6	Hendricks (4–6)	Holman (4–2)	Detmers (2)	Angel Stadium (21,741)	26–44	L3
71	June 13	@ Royals	6–4	Severino (2–6)	Wacha (3–6)	—	Kauffman Stadium (29,586)	27–44	W1
72	June 14	@ Royals	4–0	Lopez (1–4)	Lorenzen (4–7)	—	Kauffman Stadium (29,034)	28–44	W2
73	June 15	@ Royals	3–2	Ferguson (2–2)	Estévez (2–2)	Miller (14)	Kauffman Stadium (27,272)	29–44	W3
74	June 16	Astros	3–1	Miller (1–2)	Abreu (1–3)	—	Sutter Health Park (8,766)	30–44	W4
75	June 17	Astros	3–13	Alexander (1–0)	Sears (5–6)	—	Sutter Health Park (8,315)	30–45	L1
76	June 18	Astros	4–11	Valdez (8–4)	Severino (2–7)	—	Sutter Health Park (8,803)	30–46	L2
77	June 19	Astros	6–4 (10)	Kelly (1–0)	Hader (4–1)	—	Sutter Health Park (8,670)	31–46	W1
78	June 20	Guardians	5–1	Springs (6–5)	Bibee (4–7)	—	Sutter Health Park (8,578)	32–46	W2
79	June 21	Guardians	2–4	Ortiz (4–8)	Spence (2–2)	Clase (17)	Sutter Health Park (8,383)	32–47	L1
80	June 22	Guardians	0–3	Cecconi (3–3)	Sears (5–7)	Clase (18)	Sutter Health Park (10,215)	32–48	L2
81	June 24	@ Tigers	4–11	Skubal (9–2)	Severino (2–8)	—	Comerica Park (22,929)	32–49	L3
82	June 25	@ Tigers	3–0	Lopez (2–4)	Flaherty (5–9)	Miller (15)	Comerica Park (21,872)	33–49	W1
83	June 26	@ Tigers	0–8	Enns (1–0)	Springs (6–6)	—	Comerica Park (27,676)	33–50	L1
84	June 27	@ Yankees	0–3	Warren (5–4)	Spence (2–3)	Williams (11)	Yankee Stadium (46,192)	33–51	L2
85	June 28	@ Yankees	7–0	Sears (6–7)	Schmidt (4–4)	Perkins (1)	Yankee Stadium (45,084)	34–51	W1
86	June 29	@ Yankees	5–12	Stroman (1–1)	Severino (2–9)	—	Yankee Stadium (42,166)	34–52	L1
87	June 30	@ Rays	6–4	Newcomb (2–4)	Fairbanks (3–2)	Miller (16)	George M. Steinbrenner Field (10,046)	35–52	W1

July: 13–11 (Home: 7–5; Away: 6–6)

#	Date	Opponent	Score	Win	Loss	Save	Stadium (Attendance)	Record	Streak
88	July 1	@ Rays	4–3 (10)	Kelly (2–0)	Montgomery (1–2)	Miller (17)	George M. Steinbrenner Field (10,046)	36–52	W2
89	July 2	@ Rays	5–6	Pepiot (6–6)	Spence (2–4)	Uceta (1)	George M. Steinbrenner Field (10,046)	36–53	L1
90	July 4	Giants	11–2	Sears (7–7)	Verlander (0–6)	—	Sutter Health Park (12,322)	37–53	W1
91	July 5	Giants	2–7	Webb (8–6)	Severino (2–10)	—	Sutter Health Park (12,298)	37–54	L1
92	July 6	Giants	2–6	Birdsong (4–3)	Lopez (2–5)	—	Sutter Health Park (12,180)	37–55	L2
93	July 8	Braves	10–1	Springs (7–6)	Fuentes (0–3)	—	Sutter Health Park (8,620)	38–55	W1
94	July 9	Braves	2–9	Elder (3–6)	Spence (2–5)	—	Sutter Health Park (9,273)	38–56	L1
95	July 10	Braves	5–4 (11)	Sterner (2–3)	Bummer (1–2)	—	Sutter Health Park (10,258)	39–56	W1
96	July 11	Blue Jays	6–7	Scherzer (1–0)	Severino (2–11)	—	Sutter Health Park (7,950)	39–57	L1
97	July 12	Blue Jays	4–3	Lopez (3–5)	Gausman (6–7)	Miller (18)	Sutter Health Park (8,738)	40–57	W1
98	July 13	Blue Jays	6–3	Springs (8–6)	Berríos (5–4)	Miller (19)	Sutter Health Park (8,884)	41–57	W2
–	July 15	95th All-Star Game in Cumberland, GA							
99	July 18	@ Guardians	6–8	Cecconi (5–4)	Sears (7–8)	Clase (21)	Progressive Field (41,339)	41–58	L1
100	July 19	@ Guardians	8–2	Severino (3–11)	Allen (6–8)	—	Progressive Field (32,949)	42–58	W1
101	July 20	@ Guardians	2–8	Williams (6–4)	Springs (8–7)	—	Progressive Field (25,855)	42–59	L1
102	July 21	@ Rangers	2–7	Leiter (6–6)	Lopez (3–6)	—	Globe Life Field (26,430)	42–60	L2
103	July 22	@ Rangers	2–6	deGrom (10–2)	Newcomb (2–5)	—	Globe Life Field (23,032)	42–61	L3
104	July 23	@ Rangers	1–2	Gray (1–0)	Perkins (0–1)	Garcia (8)	Globe Life Field (27,719)	42–62	L4
105	July 24	@ Astros	5–2	Severino (4–11)	Alexander (1–1)	Miller (20)	Daikin Park (32,386)	43–62	W1
106	July 25	@ Astros	15–3	Springs (9–7)	Gusto (6–4)	—	Daikin Park (37,700)	44–62	W2
107	July 26	@ Astros	5–1	Sterner (3–3)	Brown (9–5)	—	Daikin Park (36,213)	45–62	W3
108	July 27	@ Astros	7–1	Ginn (2–2)	Gordon (4–3)	—	Daikin Park (36,976)	46–62	W4
109	July 28	Mariners	1–3	Castillo (8–6)	Sears (7–9)	Muñoz (24)	Sutter Health Park (9,536)	46–63	L1
110	July 29	Mariners	6–1	Severino (5–11)	Evans (4–4)	—	Sutter Health Park (8,671)	47–63	W1
111	July 30	Mariners	5–4	Springs (10–7)	Woo (8–6)	Perkins (3)	Sutter Health Park (9,165)	48–63	W2

August: 15–12 (Home: 7–8; Away: 8–4)

#	Date	Opponent	Score	Win	Loss	Save	Stadium (Attendance)	Record	Streak
112	August 1	Diamondbacks	5–1	Lopez (4–6)	DeSclafani (1–2)	—	Sutter Health Park (8,730)	49–63	W3
113	August 2	Diamondbacks	2–7	Gallen (8–12)	Ginn (2–3)	—	Sutter Health Park (8,687)	49–64	L1
114	August 3	Diamondbacks	4–6	Rodríguez (4–7)	Perkins (0–2)	Nelson (1)	Sutter Health Park (8,830)	49–65	L2
115	August 5	@ Nationals	16–7	Severino (6–11)	Gore (4–12)	—	Nationals Park (21,636)	50–65	W1
116	August 6	@ Nationals	1–2	Ferrer (3–3)	Kelly (2–1)	—	Nationals Park (14,980)	50–66	L1
117	August 7	@ Nationals	6–0	Lopez (5–6)	Parker (7–12)	—	Nationals Park (14,519)	51–66	W1
118	August 8	@ Orioles	2–3	Sugano (9–5)	Ginn (2–4)	Akin (2)	Camden Yards (20,796)	51–67	L1
119	August 9	@ Orioles	11–3	Perkins (1–2)	Young (0–6)	—	Camden Yards (30,078)	52–67	W1
120	August 10	@ Orioles	3–2	Alvarado (1–0)	Akin (3–2)	—	Camden Yards (23,183)	53–67	W2
121	August 11	Rays	4–7	Pepiot (8–9)	Springs (10–8)	Fairbanks (20)	Sutter Health Park (7,731)	53–68	L1
122	August 12	Rays	6–0	Lopez (6–6)	Baz (8–9)	—	Sutter Health Park (8,305)	54–68	W1
123	August 13	Rays	2–8	Rasmussen (10–5)	Ginn (2–5)	—	Sutter Health Park (8,275)	54–69	L1
124	August 15	Angels	10–3	Perkins (2–2)	Kikuchi (6–8)	—	Sutter Health Park (8,484)	55–69	W1
125	August 16	Angels	7–2	Morales (1–0)	Anderson (2–8)	Newcomb (1)	Sutter Health Park (10,035)	56–69	W2
126	August 17	Angels	5–11 (10)	Jansen (5–2)	Kelly (2–2)	—	Sutter Health Park (8,876)	56–70	L1
127	August 19	@ Twins	6–3	Lopez (7–6)	Ryan (12–6)	Harris (1)	Target Field (22,725)	57–70	W1
128	August 20	@ Twins	4–2 (10)	Kelly (3–2)	Cabrera (0–1)	Ferguson (2)	Target Field (18,448)	58–70	W2
129	August 21	@ Twins	8–3	Perkins (3–2)	Ureña (0–1)	Bido (1)	Target Field (21,837)	59–70	W3
130	August 22	@ Mariners	2–3	Woo (11–7)	Alvarado (1–1)	Muñoz (30)	T-Mobile Park (36,958)	59–71	L1
131	August 23	@ Mariners	2–1 (10)	Ferguson (3–2)	Ferguson (3–3)	Harris (2)	T-Mobile Park (36,524)	60–71	W1
132	August 24	@ Mariners	4–11	Gilbert (4–5)	Lopez (7–7)	—	T-Mobile Park (37,550)	60–72	L1
133	August 25	Tigers	8–3	Kelly (4–2)	Skubal (11–4)	—	Sutter Health Park (8,105)	61–72	W1
134	August 26	Tigers	7–6 (10)	Núñez (1–0)	Vest (6–3)	—	Sutter Health Park (9,043)	62–72	W2
135	August 27	Tigers	7–0	Morales (2–0)	Mize (12–5)	—	Sutter Health Park (8,551)	63–72	W3
136	August 29	Rangers	2–5	Leiter (9–7)	Springs (10–9)	Armstrong (5)	Sutter Health Park (8,413)	63–73	L1
137	August 30	Rangers	3–9	Kelly (11–7)	Barnett (0–1)	—	Sutter Health Park (8,941)	63–74	L2
138	August 31	Rangers	6–9	deGrom (11–6)	Ginn (2–6)	—	Sutter Health Park (8,716)	63–75	L3

September: 13–11 (Home: 7–5; Away: 6–6)

#	Date	Opponent	Score	Win	Loss	Save	Stadium (Attendance)	Record	Streak
139	September 1	@ Cardinals	11–3	Morales (3–0)	Gray (12–8)	—	Busch Stadium (22,670)	64–75	W1
140	September 2	@ Cardinals	1–2	Mikolas (7–10)	Kelly (4–3)	Romero (6)	Busch Stadium (17,002)	64–76	L1
141	September 3	@ Cardinals	1–5	Liberatore (7–11)	Springs (10–10)	Romero (7)	Busch Stadium (17,516)	64–77	L2
142	September 5	@ Angels	10–4	Barnett (1–1)	Soriano (10–10)	—	Angel Stadium (30,779)	65–77	W1
143	September 6	@ Angels	17–4	Ginn (3–6)	Kikuchi (6–11)	—	Angel Stadium (35,816)	66–77	W2
144	September 7	@ Angels	3–4	Detmers (5–3)	Bido (2–5)	Jansen (26)	Angel Stadium (33,053)	66–78	L1
145	September 8	Red Sox	0–7	Crochet (15–5)	Morales (3–1)	—	Sutter Health Park (10,079)	66–79	L2
146	September 9	Red Sox	0–6	Early (1–0)	Springs (10–11)	—	Sutter Health Park (10,066)	66–80	L3
147	September 10	Red Sox	5–4	Harris (2–1)	Chapman (4–3)	—	Sutter Health Park (9,634)	67–80	W1
148	September 12	Reds	3–0	Ferguson (4–2)	Singer (13–10)	Newcomb (2)	Sutter Health Park (8,333)	68–80	W2
149	September 13	Reds	11–5	Basso (1–0)	Martinez (10–13)	—	Sutter Health Park (8,758)	69–80	W3
150	September 14	Reds	7–4	Morales (4–1)	Lodolo (8–8)	Kelly (1)	Sutter Health Park (8,778)	70–80	W4
151	September 16	@ Red Sox	2–1	Spence (3–5)	Weissert (6–6)	Harris (3)	Fenway Park (35,886)	71–80	W5
152	September 17	@ Red Sox	4–5 (10)	Murphy (3–0)	Kelly (4–4)	—	Fenway Park (36,404)	71–81	L1
153	September 18	@ Red Sox	5–3	Ginn (4–6)	Bello (11–8)	Harris (4)	Fenway Park (32,828)	72–81	W1
154	September 19	@ Pirates	4–3	Severino (7–11)	Keller (6–15)	Kelly (2)	PNC Park (20,584)	73–81	W2
155	September 20	@ Pirates	0–2	Chandler (3–1)	Morales (4–2)	Santana (14)	PNC Park (18,209)	73–82	L1
156	September 21	@ Pirates	0–11	Mlodzinski (5–8)	Spence (3–6)	—	PNC Park (16,107)	73–83	L2
157	September 23	Astros	5–1	Springs (11–11)	Javier (2–4)	—	Sutter Health Park (9,465)	74–83	W1
158	September 24	Astros	6–0	Severino (8–11)	Brown (12–9)	—	Sutter Health Park (9,753)	75–83	W2
159	September 25	Astros	5–11	Valdez (13–11)	Ginn (4–7)	—	Sutter Health Park (8,293)	75–84	L1
160	September 26	Royals	4–3	Sterner (4–3)	Avila (1–1)	—	Sutter Health Park (10,543)	76–84	W1
161	September 27	Royals	2–4	Wacha (10–13)	Morales (4–3)	Estévez (42)	Sutter Health Park (10,047)	76–85	L1
162	September 28	Royals	2–9	Lynch IV (6–2)	Basso (1–1)	—	Sutter Health Park (8,754)	76–86	L2

== Roster ==
2025 Athletics
Roster
Pitchers: 49 Jason Alexander; 61 Elvis Alvarado; 63 Mason Barnett; 66 Brady Basso; 45 Osvaldo Bido; 62 Ben Bowden; 39 Carlos Duran; 68 Joey Estes; 44 Tyler Ferguson; 70 J. T. Ginn; 36 Hogan Harris; 53 Gunnar Hoglund; 67 Grant Holman; 49 Michael Kelly; 62 Matt Krook; 37 José Leclerc; 57 Jacob Lopez; 56 Anthony Maldonado; 48 T. J. McFarland; 48 Scott McGough; 19 Mason Miller; 58 Luis Morales; 58 Noah Murdock; 31 Sean Newcomb; 54 Eduarniel Núñez; 47 Michel Otañez; 52 Ángel Perdomo; 50 Jack Perkins; 38 JP Sears; 40 Luis Severino; 28 Mitch Spence; 59 Jeffrey Springs; 60 Justin Sterner	Catchers: 23 Shea Langeliers; 65 Willie MacIver; 64 Jhonny Pereda; 29 Austin Wynns; Infielders: 26 CJ Alexander; 22 Miguel Andújar; 6 Logan Davidson; 20 Zack Gelof; 11 Brett Harris; 2 Darell Hernáiz; 16 Nick Kurtz; 10 Max Muncy; 12 Max Schuemann; 17 Luis Urías; 13 Gio Urshela; 5 Jacob Wilson	Outfielders: 35 Drew Avans; 33 JJ Bleday; 15 Seth Brown; 4 Lawrence Butler; 1 Denzel Clarke; 26 Carlos Cortes; 25 Brent Rooker; 21 Tyler Soderstrom; 32 Colby Thomas	Manager: 7 Mark Kotsay; Coaches: 18 Mike Aldrete (hitting); 51 Darren Bush (bench); 41 Chris Cron (assistant hitting); 8 Bobby Crosby (first base); 14 Scott Emerson (pitching); 88 Ramón Hernández (coach and interpreter); 71 Dan Hubbs (bullpen); 91 Dustin Hughes (bullpen catcher); 72 Marcus Jensen (quality control); 3 Eric Martins (third base); 90 Christian Molfetta (bullpen catcher)

== Player stats ==
= Indicates team leader

=== Batting ===
Note: G = Games played; AB = At bats; R = Runs scored; H = Hits; 2B = Doubles; 3B = Triples; HR = Home runs; RBI = Runs batted in; SB = Stolen bases; BB = Walks; AVG = Batting average; SLG = Slugging average

Player	G	AB	R	H	2B	3B	HR	RBI	SB	BB	AVG	SLG
Brent Rooker	162	626	92	164	40	3	30	89	6	65	.262	.479
Lawrence Butler	152	569	83	133	30	2	21	63	22	59	.234	.404
Tyler Soderstrom	158	561	75	155	34	1	25	93	8	55	.276	.474
Jacob Wilson	125	486	62	151	26	0	13	63	5	27	.311	.444
Shea Langeliers	123	481	73	133	32	0	31	72	7	36	.277	.536
Nick Kurtz	117	420	90	122	26	2	36	86	2	63	.290	.619
JJ Bleday	98	307	48	65	17	0	14	39	1	36	.212	.404
Luis Urías	96	287	27	66	7	0	8	25	2	31	.230	.338
Miguel Andújar	60	218	22	65	10	1	6	27	1	11	.298	.436
Max Muncy	63	206	17	44	7	0	9	23	1	10	.214	.379
Max Schuemann	101	183	20	36	4	2	2	13	7	22	.197	.273
Gio Urshela	59	181	10	43	14	1	0	20	0	13	.238	.326
Darell Hernáiz	51	173	17	40	5	1	2	16	3	17	.231	.306
Denzel Clarke	47	148	18	34	8	2	3	8	6	6	.230	.372
Colby Thomas	49	120	20	27	5	0	6	19	2	7	.225	.417
Willie MacIver	32	102	7	19	5	0	3	9	3	7	.186	.324
Carlos Cortes	42	94	11	29	8	1	4	14	0	3	.309	.543
Zack Gelof	30	92	12	16	3	0	2	7	1	7	.174	.272
Brett Harris	32	73	11	20	5	0	0	5	1	7	.274	.342
Seth Brown	38	65	6	12	2	0	1	3	1	9	.185	.262
Austin Wynns	22	63	7	14	5	0	3	10	0	2	.222	.444
Jhonny Pereda	17	40	3	7	2	0	0	3	0	6	.175	.225
Logan Davidson	9	20	1	3	1	0	0	2	0	3	.150	.200
CJ Alexander	6	17	0	3	0	0	0	0	0	0	.176	.176
Drew Avans	7	15	1	2	0	0	0	0	1	0	.133	.133
Team totals	162	5547	733	1403	296	16	219	709	80	502	.253	.431

Source:Baseball Reference

=== Pitching ===
Note: W = Wins; L = Losses; ERA = Earned run average; G = Games pitched; GS = Games started; SV = Saves; IP = Innings pitched; H = Hits allowed; R = Runs allowed; ER = Earned runs allowed; BB = Walks allowed; SO = Strikeouts

Player	W	L	ERA	G	GS	SV	IP	H	R	ER	BB	SO
Jeffrey Springs	11	11	4.11	32	30	0	171.0	153	90	78	54	138
Luis Severino	8	11	4.54	29	29	0	162.2	162	93	82	50	124
JP Sears	7	9	4.95	22	22	0	111.0	112	63	61	29	97
Jacob Lopez	7	7	4.08	21	17	0	92.2	81	47	42	37	113
J. T. Ginn	4	7	5.08	23	16	0	90.1	92	52	51	31	99
Mitch Spence	3	6	5.10	32	8	1	84.2	96	57	48	26	66
Osvaldo Bido	2	5	5.87	26	10	1	79.2	93	56	52	35	68
Justin Sterner	4	3	3.18	59	1	0	65.0	47	24	23	21	70
Hogan Harris	2	1	3.20	48	0	4	64.2	54	26	23	33	65
Tyler Ferguson	4	2	4.66	56	0	2	58.0	43	32	30	34	54
Sean Newcomb	2	1	1.75	36	0	2	51.1	39	12	10	14	50
Luis Morales	4	3	3.14	10	9	0	48.2	38	18	17	18	43
Elvis Alvarado	1	1	3.19	37	0	0	42.1	34	17	15	22	50
Michael Kelly	4	4	3.18	42	0	2	39.2	32	17	14	19	29
Jack Perkins	3	2	4.19	12	4	3	38.2	27	18	18	18	37
Mason Miller	1	2	3.76	38	0	20	38.1	21	17	16	18	59
Gunnar Hoglund	1	3	6.40	6	6	0	32.1	38	23	23	11	23
Grant Holman	4	2	5.09	22	2	0	23.0	26	14	13	9	17
Mason Barnett	1	1	6.85	5	5	0	22.1	26	18	17	11	18
Noah Murdock	1	1	13.24	14	0	0	17.0	26	25	25	20	21
T. J. McFarland	0	0	6.89	27	0	0	15.2	26	12	12	3	7
Brady Basso	1	1	2.31	11	1	0	11.2	12	4	3	9	8
Joey Estes	0	2	9.82	3	2	0	11.0	16	12	12	6	6
Ben Bowden	0	0	4.22	11	0	0	10.2	9	6	5	5	7
José Leclerc	0	1	6.00	10	0	0	9.0	13	6	6	5	8
Scott McGough	0	0	7.00	6	0	0	9.0	12	7	7	1	11
Eduarniel Núñez	1	0	9.00	6	0	0	8.0	9	8	8	7	9
Jason Alexander	0	0	18.00	4	0	0	6.0	12	13	12	5	5
Anthony Maldonado	0	0	12.00	6	0	0	6.0	10	8	8	5	7
Michel Otañez	0	0	13.50	6	0	0	5.1	7	8	8	5	6
Ángel Perdomo	0	0	5.40	4	0	0	3.1	2	2	2	3	2
Matt Krook	0	0	5.40	3	0	0	3.1	5	2	2	1	3
Jhonny Pereda	0	0	21.00	3	0	0	3.0	9	7	7	2	3
Willie MacIver	0	0	0.00	2	0	0	2.0	4	0	0	0	0
Carlos Duran	0	0	81.00	1	0	0	0.1	1	3	3	3	0
Team totals	76	86	4.71	162	162	35	1437.2	1387	817	753	570	1323

Source:Baseball Reference

== Farm system ==
Level	Team	League	Division	Manager	Record
AAA	Las Vegas Aviators	Pacific Coast League	West	Fran Riordan	83–67 (.553)
AA	Midland RockHounds	Texas League	South	Gregorio Petit	66–72 (.478)
High-A	Lansing Lugnuts	Midwest League	East	Darryl Kennedy	62–70 (.470)
Low-A	Stockton Ports	California League	North	Javier Godard	57–75 (.432)
Rookie	ACL Athletics	Arizona Complex League	East	Tim Esmay	25–35 (.417)
Rookie	DSL Athletics	Dominican Summer League	West	Wilkin Castillo	35–20 (.636)
