= Jacob Lopez =

American baseball player (born 1998)

Athletics – No. 57
- Pitcher
- Born: March 11, 1998 (age 28); Los Angeles, California, U.S.
- Bats: Left Throws: Left

MLB debut
- August 14, 2023, for the Tampa Bay Rays

MLB statistics (through 2026 season)
- Win–loss record: 15–12
- Earned run average: 4.86
- Strikeouts: 241
- Stats at Baseball Reference

Teams
- Tampa Bay Rays (2023–2024); Athletics (2025–present)

Jacob Lopez (born March 11, 1998) is an American professional baseball pitcher for the Athletics of Major League Baseball (MLB). He made his MLB debut in 2023 with the Tampa Bay Rays.

== Career ==
=== Amateur career ===
Lopez attended Saugus High School and College of the Canyons, both in Santa Clarita, California. He played baseball in both high school and college.

=== San Francisco Giants ===
The San Francisco Giants selected Lopez in the 26th round, with the 766th overall selection of the 2018 Major League Baseball draft. He made his professional debut with the rookie-level Arizona League Giants, recording a 1.42 ERA in 9 games. Lopez began the 2019 season with the Low-A Salem-Keizer Volcanoes, starting 9 games and posting a 3.02 ERA with 39 strikeouts across 41 2/3 innings pitched.

=== Tampa Bay Rays ===
On July 31, 2019, the Giants traded Lopez to the Tampa Bay Rays in exchange for Joe McCarthy. He made 3 starts for the Low-A Hudson Valley Renegades down the stretch, recording a 2–0 record and 2.40 ERA with 18 strikeouts. Lopez did not play in a game in 2020 due to the cancellation of the minor league season because of the COVID-19 pandemic.

Lopez began the 2021 season with the High-A Bowling Green Hot Rods, making 14 appearances (10 starts) and registering a 3–1 record and 2.30 ERA with 88 strikeouts across 54 2/3 innings of work. Lopez suffered an elbow injury in late August that necessitated Tommy John surgery and caused him to miss the entire 2022 season.

Lopez began the 2023 season with the Double-A Montgomery Biscuits, and was promoted to the Triple-A Durham Bulls after 8 games. In 18 starts for Durham, he pitched to a 4–5 record and 2.72 ERA with 87 strikeouts in 79 1/3 innings pitched. On August 14, 2023, Lopez was promoted to the major leagues for the first time. He made his debut that day in relief against the Giants, in which he recorded a save. In 4 games for Tampa Bay, Lopez logged a 4.38 ERA with 8 strikeouts across 12 1/3 innings of work.

Lopez was optioned to Triple-A Durham to begin the 2024 season. He made 4 appearances for the Rays, posting a 5.23 ERA with 8 strikeouts across 10 1/3 innings pitched.

=== Athletics ===
On December 14, 2024, Lopez and pitcher Jeffrey Springs were traded to the Athletics in exchange for Joe Boyle, Will Simpson, Jacob Watters, and a Competitive Balance Round A draft pick in the 2025 MLB draft. Lopez was optioned to the Triple-A Las Vegas Aviators to begin the 2025 season. After three minor league appearances, he debuted with the Athletics on April 18.
