= Chris Mazza =

American baseball player (born 1989)

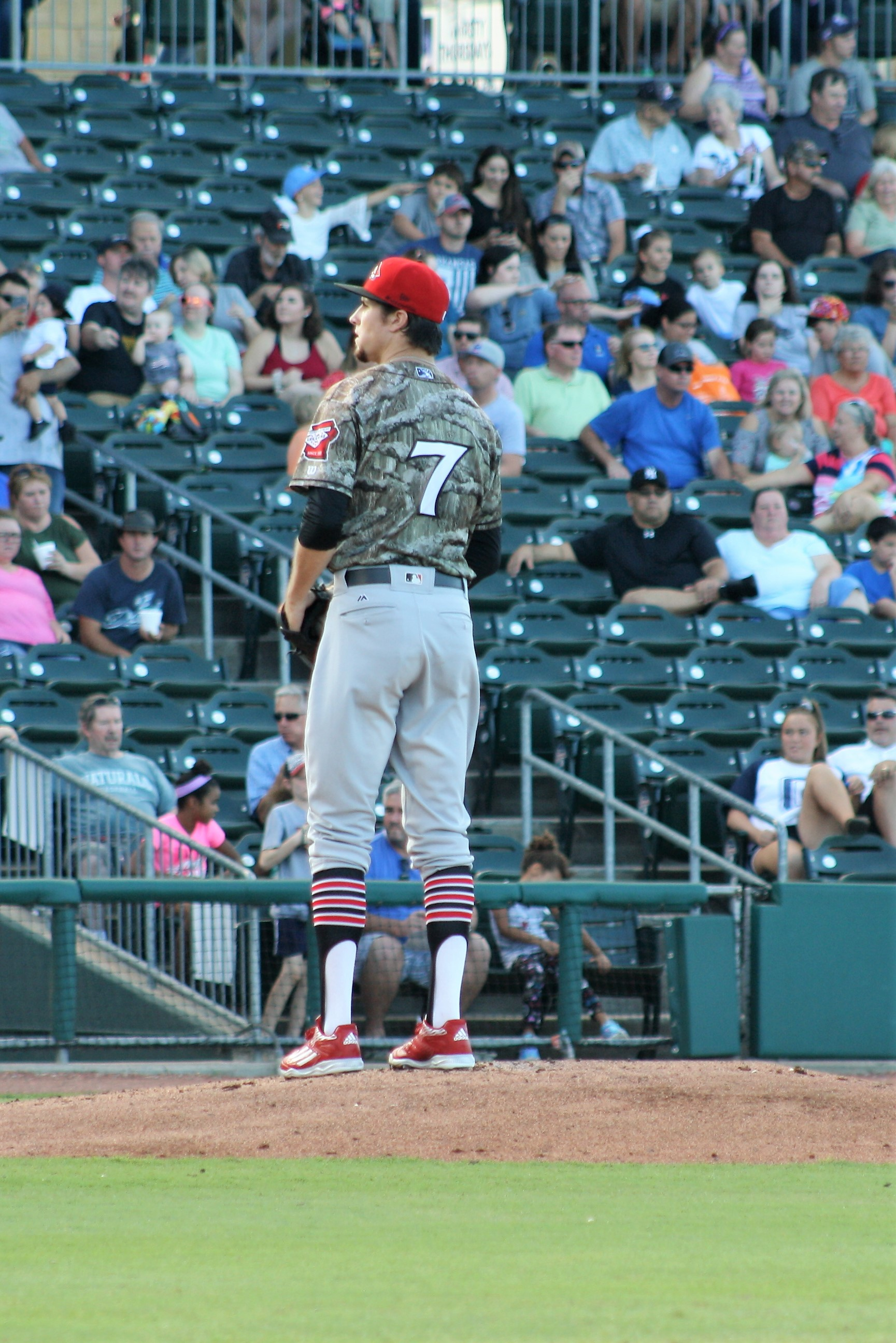
- Mazza with the Arkansas Travelers in 2018
- Pitcher
- Born: October 17, 1989 (age 36); Walnut Creek, California, U.S.
- Batted: Right Threw: Right

MLB debut
- June 29, 2019, for the New York Mets

Last MLB appearance
- April 17, 2022, for the Tampa Bay Rays

MLB statistics
- Win–loss record: 3–3
- Earned run average: 5.35
- Strikeouts: 66
- Stats at Baseball Reference

Teams
- New York Mets (2019); Boston Red Sox (2020); Tampa Bay Rays (2021–2022)

Christopher James Mazza (born October 17, 1989) is an American former professional baseball pitcher. He played in Major League Baseball (MLB) for the New York Mets, Boston Red Sox, and Tampa Bay Rays. Listed at 6 feet 4 inches (1.93 m) and 180 pounds (82 kg), he batted and threw right-handed.

== Career ==
Mazza attended Clayton Valley High School in Concord, California. He attended Menlo College in Atherton, California.

=== Minnesota Twins ===
Mazza was drafted by the Minnesota Twins in the 27th round of the 2011 MLB draft. He became the first player ever drafted out of Menlo College. Mazza spent time in the Twins organization from 2011 to 2015. During his time with them, he played for the Gulf Coast League Twins, Elizabethton Twins, and Cedar Rapids Kernels. He was released by the Twins on July 22, 2015.

=== Miami Marlins ===
Mazza signed a minor league contract with the Miami Marlins on August 4, 2015. While in the Miami organization, he played for the GCL Marlins, Jupiter Hammerheads, Jacksonville Suns, Jacksonville Jumbo Shrimp, and New Orleans Baby Cakes. He was released by the Marlins on May 19, 2018.

=== San Rafael Pacifics ===
After being released by Miami, Mazza signed with the San Rafael Pacifics of the Pacific Association. In 17 games (1 start) for the Pacifics, he posted a 3-2 record and 0.59 ERA with 31 strikeouts across 30 2/3 innings of work.

=== Southern Maryland Blue Crabs ===
On July 13, 2018, Mazza signed a contract with the Southern Maryland Blue Crabs of the Atlantic League. In 9 games (1 start) for the Blue Crabs, he registered a 3-0 record and 0.42 ERA with 20 strikeouts across 21 2/3 innings pitched.

=== Seattle Mariners ===
On August 17, 2018, Mazza was signed by the Seattle Mariners, and was assigned to the Arkansas Travelers for the remainder of the season.

=== New York Mets ===
On December 13, 2018, Mazza was selected by the New York Mets in the Triple-A phase of the 2018 Rule 5 draft.

Mazza opened the 2019 season playing for the Binghamton Rumble Ponies and the Syracuse Mets. On June 26, Mazza's contract was selected and he was called up to the major leagues for the first time. He made his major league debut on June 29 against the Atlanta Braves, pitching four innings in relief in which he gave up one earned run while striking out two. Overall with the 2019 Mets, Mazza appeared in nine games, all in relief, compiling a 1–1 record with 5.51 ERA in 16 1/3 innings pitched while striking out 11 batters. Mazza was designated for assignment on December 13, 2019.

=== Boston Red Sox ===
The Boston Red Sox claimed Mazza off waivers on December 20, 2019. On March 26, 2020, the team optioned Mazza to the High-A Salem Red Sox. He was added to Boston's active roster on July 29, and made his first appearance with the team on August 1 against the New York Yankees. He was optioned to the Red Sox' alternate training site after the game of August 5, as clubs reduced their 2020 active rosters to 28 players. He was recalled twice during August.

Overall with the 2020 Red Sox, Mazza appeared in nine games (six starts), compiling a 1–2 record with 4.80 ERA and 29 strikeouts in 30 innings pitched. His only victory of the season came on September 8, against the Philadelphia Phillies. He gave up the longest MLB home run of the season, a 495-foot (151 m) shot to Ronald Acuña Jr. of the Atlanta Braves. On February 12, 2021, Mazza was designated for assignment after the signing of Martín Pérez.

=== Tampa Bay Rays ===
On February 17, 2021, the Red Sox traded Mazza and Jeffrey Springs to the Tampa Bay Rays in exchange for Ronaldo Hernández and Nick Sogard. On August 27, Mazza pitched the final 3 innings of a 6–3 victory over the Baltimore Orioles to earn his first career save. On November 5, Mazza was outrighted off of the 40-man roster and elected free agency. He re-signed with the Rays on a minor league contract on January 7, 2022, and was selected to the Rays' roster on April 7. In 2 appearances, Mazza gave up seven runs in 5.1 innings pitched.

On May 18, Mazza was placed on the 60-day injured list with a back injury. On June 20, 2022, he was reinstated from the 60-day injured list and was designated for assignment. He elected free agency on June 22.

=== Seattle Mariners (second stint) ===
On June 28, 2022, the Seattle Mariners signed Mazza to a minor league contract. Mazza made 15 appearances (7 starts) for the Triple-A Tacoma Rainiers to close out the season. In 46 2/3 innings pitched, he logged a 5–3 record and 7.75 ERA. Mazza elected free agency following the season on November 10.

=== Saraperos de Saltillo ===
On March 13, 2023, Mazza signed with the Saraperos de Saltillo of the Mexican League. In 3 starts, he posted a 0–2 record with a 6.75 ERA over 12 innings. The team announced he had suffered an elbow injury requiring surgery and released him on May 13.

=== Kane County Cougars ===
On April 7, 2025, Mazza signed with the Kane County Cougars of the American Association of Professional Baseball and travelled with the team to participate in the 2025 Baseball Champions League Americas. In 16 starts for the team, Mazza had an ERA of 3.83 in 82 1/3 with 59 strikeouts; his performance helped the Cougars win their second consecutive league championship.

On January 28, 2026, Mazza announced his retirement from professional baseball via his Instagram.

== Personal life ==
Mazza is related to Joe, Dom and Vince DiMaggio by way of his grandmother, who is a cousin of the DiMaggio brothers.

Mazza and his wife, Callie, married in November 2020. Their first child, a daughter, was born in February 2022.
