= Ronaldo Hernández =

Colombian baseball player (born 1997)

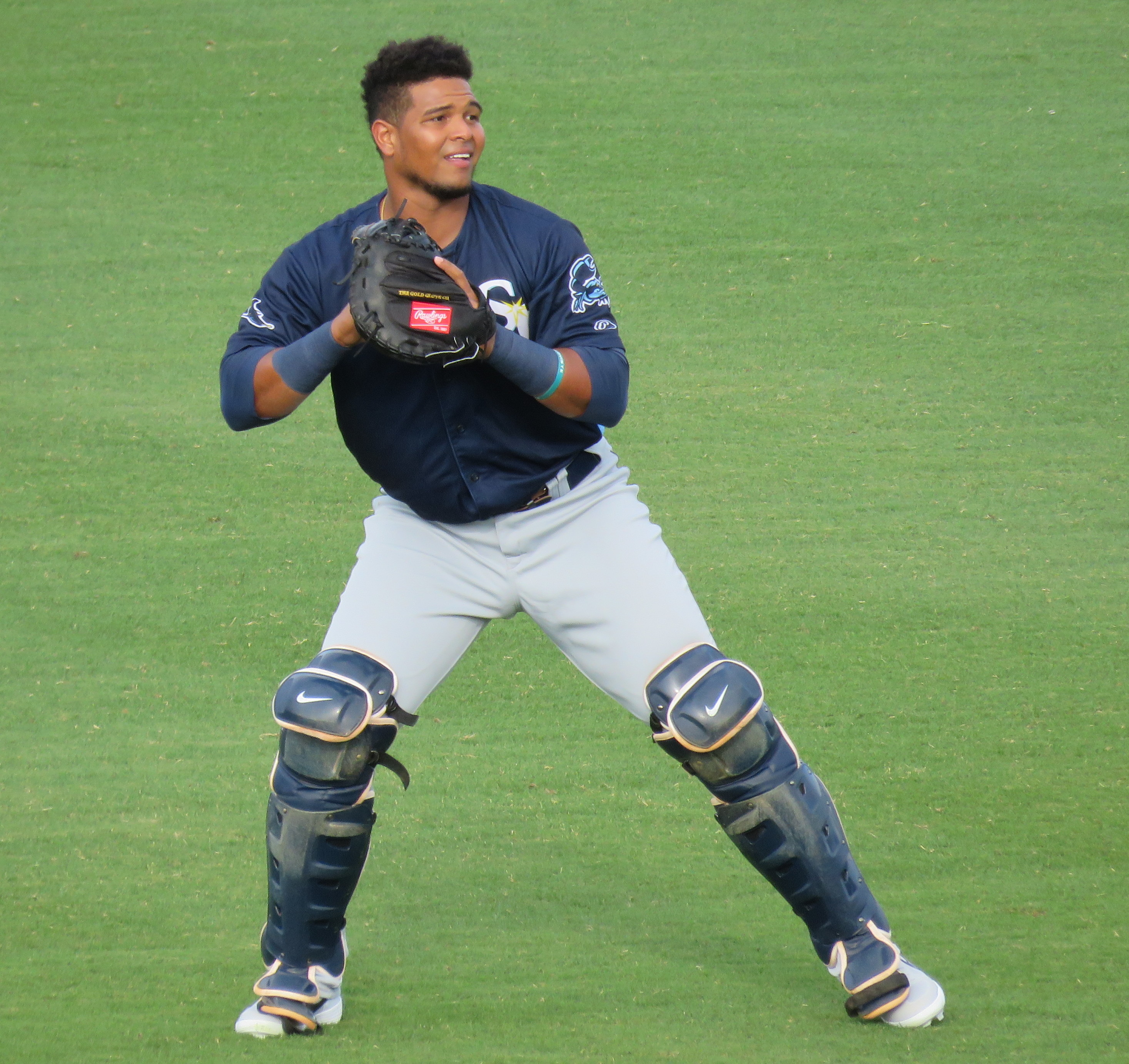
- Hernandez with the Charlotte StoneCrabs

Long Island Ducks – No. 50
- Catcher
- Born: November 11, 1997 (age 28); Arjona, Colombia
- Bats: Right Throws: Right
- Stats at Baseball Reference

Ronaldo José Hernández (born November 11, 1997) is a Colombian professional baseball catcher for the Long Island Ducks of the Atlantic League of Professional Baseball. He is currently considered a phantom ballplayer, having spent multiple stints on the Boston Red Sox's active roster without making an appearance in a Major League Baseball (MLB) game. Listed at 6 feet 1 inch (1.85 m) and 230 pounds (100 kg), he throws and bats right-handed.

== Career ==
=== Tampa Bay Rays ===
Hernández signed with the Tampa Bay Rays as an international free agent on August 9, 2014. He made his professional debut in 2015 with the Dominican Summer League Rays, recording a .227 batting average in 13 games. He played 2016 with the Dominican Summer League Rays, slashing .340/.406/.485 with 6 home runs and 35 runs batted in (RBIs) in 54 games, and 2017 with the Princeton Rays, hitting .332 with 5 home runs and 40 RBIs in 54 games.

Hernández played in 2018 with the Bowling Green Hot Rods where he slashed .284/.339/.494 with 21 home runs and 79 RBIs in 109 games. After the season, he played in the Arizona Fall League for the Peoria Javelinas. He spent 2019 with the Charlotte Stone Crabs, slashing .265/.299/.397 with 9 home runs and 60 RBI in 103 games. Hernández was named to the 2019 All-Star Futures Game. He played for the Salt River Rafters in the Arizona Fall League following the 2019 season.

On November 20, 2019, the Rays added Hernández to their 40-man roster to protect him from the Rule 5 draft. He did not play in a game in 2020 due to the cancellation of the minor league season because of the COVID-19 pandemic.

=== Boston Red Sox ===
On February 17, 2021, the Rays traded Hernández and Nick Sogard to the Boston Red Sox in exchange for Chris Mazza and Jeffrey Springs. Hernández began the 2021 season in Double-A with the Portland Sea Dogs and was promoted late in the season to the Triple-A Worcester Red Sox; in 99 total games, be batted a combined .284 with 16 home runs and 58 RBIs.

Hernández began the 2022 season with Worcester. He was selected to Boston's active roster on April 19, after both Christian Vázquez and Kevin Plawecki were placed on the COVID-19 injured list, then returned to Worcester the following day, when Vázquez was reactivated. The Red Sox again added Hernández to their major-league roster for one game, on August 1, following the trade of Vázquez and prior to catcher Reese McGuire joining the team. Hernández spending time on Boston's active roster without yet appearing in a major-league game made him an example of a phantom ballplayer. In 105 games for Worcester, he hit .261/.298/.451 with 17 home runs and 63 RBI. On December 2, Hernández was removed from the 40-man roster, and sent outright to Triple–A.

Hernández spent the 2023 season back in Worcester, playing in 99 games and batting .242/.336/.445 with 17 home runs and 70 RBI. He elected free agency following the season on November 6, 2023.

=== Arizona Diamondbacks ===
On December 20, 2023, Hernández signed a minor league contract with the Arizona Diamondbacks. He played in 63 games for the Triple–A Reno Aces in 2024, slashing .311/.357/.507 with 11 home runs and 36 RBI. Hernández was released by the Diamondbacks organization on September 18, 2024.

=== New York Yankees ===
On February 9, 2025, Hernández signed a minor league contract with the New York Yankees that included an invitation to spring training. In 25 appearances for the Triple-A Scranton/Wilkes-Barre RailRiders, he batted .221/.287/.351 with two home runs, 13 RBI, and one stolen base. Hernández was released by the Yankees organization on July 4.

=== Pericos de Puebla ===
On July 8, 2025, Hernández signed with the Pericos de Puebla of the Mexican League. In two appearances for Puebla, he went 1-for-6 (.167). Hernández was released by the Pericos on July 11.

=== Boston Red Sox (second stint) ===
On July 17, 2025, Hernández signed a minor league contract with the Boston Red Sox. Hernández made 26 appearances for the Double-A Portland Sea Dogs, batting .198/.263/.308 with two home runs and eight RBI; he also made four appearances for the Triple-A Worcester Red Sox, going 1-for-15 (.067) with one RBI and one walk. Hernández elected free agency following the season on November 6.

=== Leones de Yucatán ===
On January 9, 2026, Hernández signed with the Leones de Yucatán of the Mexican League. He made 12 appearances for the Leones, batting .156/.206/.188 with one double and two RBI. On May 4, Hernández was released by Yucatán.

=== Long Island Ducks ===
On May 15, 2026, Hernández signed with the Long Island Ducks of the Atlantic League of Professional Baseball.
