= Nick Sogard =

American baseball player (born 1997)

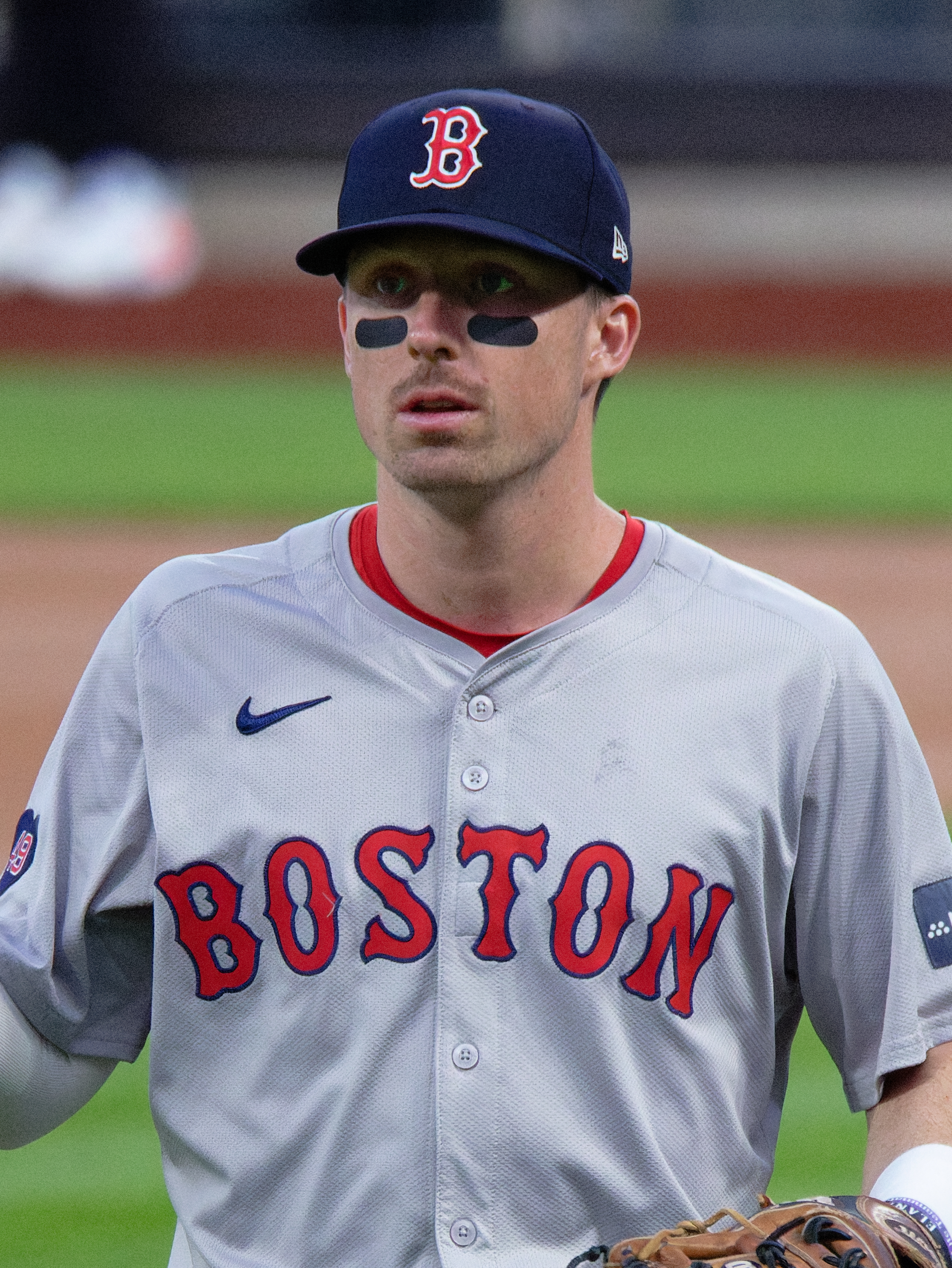
- Sogard with the Red Sox in 2024

Boston Red Sox – No. 20
- Infielder
- Born: September 9, 1997 (age 29); Los Angeles, California, U.S.
- Bats: Switch Throws: Right

MLB debut
- August 2, 2024, for the Boston Red Sox

MLB statistics (through 2026 season)
- Batting average: .260
- Home runs: 5
- Runs batted in: 36
- Stats at Baseball Reference

Teams
- Boston Red Sox (2024–present)

Nicholas John Sogard (born September 9, 1997) is an American professional baseball infielder for the Boston Red Sox of Major League Baseball (MLB). He made his MLB debut in 2024.

== Career ==
Sogard attended Jesuit High School in Carmichael, California, and Loyola Marymount University, where he played college baseball for the Loyola Marymount Lions. In 2018, he played collegiate summer baseball for the Duluth Huskies of the Northwoods League.

=== Tampa Bay Rays ===
The Tampa Bay Rays drafted Sogard in the 12th round of the 2019 MLB draft, with the 368th overall selection. He made his professional debut with the Low-A Hudson Valley Renegades, recording a .290 batting average in 63 games. Sogard did not play in a game in 2020 due to the cancellation of the minor-league season because of the COVID-19 pandemic.

=== Boston Red Sox ===
On February 17, 2021, the Rays traded Sogard and Ronaldo Hernández to the Boston Red Sox in exchange for Jeffrey Springs and Chris Mazza. Sogard split the year between the High-A Greenville Drive and Double-A Portland Sea Dogs, posting an aggregate .276/.346/.461 slash line with 13 home runs and 42 runs batted in (RBI) across 80 total games.

Sogard split the 2022 campaign between Portland and the Triple-A Worcester Red Sox. In 125 total games with the two affiliates, he slashed .254/.359/.349 with four home runs, 43 RBI, and 18 stolen bases. Sogard returned to Worcester in 2023, playing in 112 games and slashing .266/.370/.391 with seven home runs, 47 RBI, and 17 stolen bases. He began the 2024 campaign with Worcester, slashing .279/.382/.439 with 12 home runs, 54 RBI, and 10 stolen bases over 89 appearances prior to being called up.

On July 31, 2024, the Red Sox selected Sogard to the 40-man roster and promoted him to the major leagues for the first time. He made his major-league debut on August 2. In 31 appearances for the Red Sox during his rookie campaign, Sogard batted .273/.326/.325 with eight RBI and three stolen bases.

Sogard was optioned to Triple-A Worcester to begin the 2025 season. He was recalled by Boston on May 10, following an injury to Romy González. Sogard would play 14 games for the Red Sox before being optioned down to Triple-A. He was once again recalled to the Red Sox on June 27 when Marcelo Mayer was placed on the bereavement list. Sogard would only play three games with the team before being optioned to Worcester. Sogard was recalled and optioned after a single game with the Red Sox on August 29, before being recalled for a final time that year on September 3rd after Roman Anthony suffered a left oblique strain. Through 30 games with the Red Sox in 2025, Sogard slashed .260/.317/.344 with nine RBI and two stolen bases. In his 91 games in Worcester that year, he slashed .277/.393/.385 with five home runs, 28 RBI, and 16 stolen bases.

Sogard was optioned to Triple-A Worcester to begin the 2026 season. After an injury to Trevor Story, Sogard was recalled by Boston on May 16. In 36 games with Worcester, he batted .269/.417/.454 with five home runs and 23 RBI. He would play 12 games for the Red Sox, before being placed on the injured list on June 3 due to right side soreness. He would be optioned to Worcester upon returning on July 12. Following an injury to Curtis Mead, Sogard would once again be recalled to the Red Sox on July 29. He batted .270/.386/.378 with 5 RBI over 10 games in his second Triple-A stint of the year. On August 19, Sogard hit his first major league home run. It came off of Arizona Diamondbacks pitcher Brandon Pfaadt to lead off the bottom of the first inning in an eventual 7-6 loss.

== Personal life ==
Sogard's cousins Eric Sogard and Alex Sogard both played professional baseball. Eric was drafted by the San Diego Padres in the second round of the 2007 MLB draft, and played in the major leagues from 2010 to 2021. Alex was drafted by the Houston Astros in the 26th round of the 2010 MLB draft, but never reached the majors and retired following the 2015 campaign. Sogard is also a nephew of former major-league players Steve Sax and Dave Sax.

Sogard grew up a fan of the Boston Red Sox.
