= Lawrence Butler (baseball) =

American baseball player (born 2000)

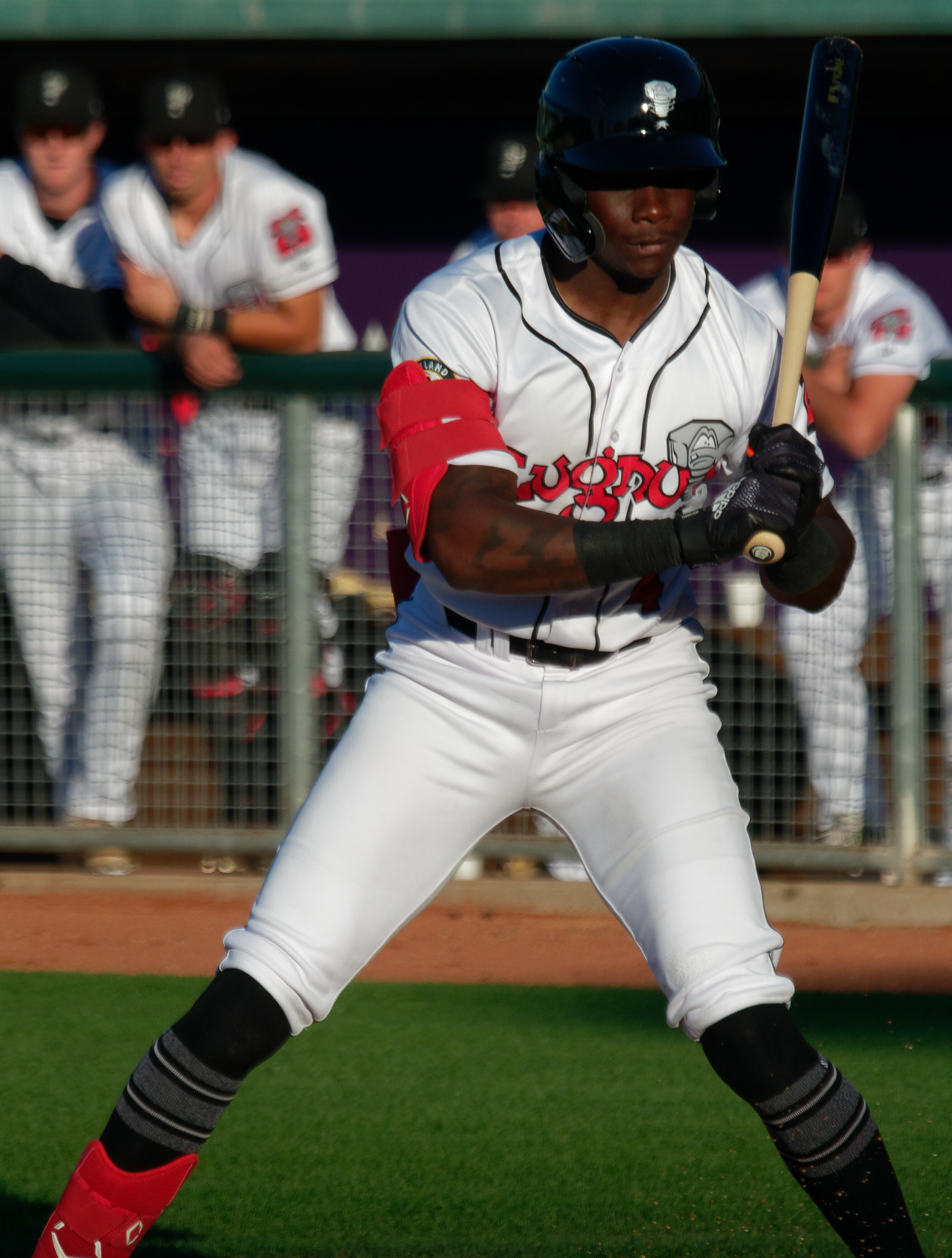
- Butler with the Lansing Lugnuts in 2021

Athletics – No. 4
- Outfielder
- Born: July 10, 2000 (age 26); Burlington, New Jersey, U.S.
- Bats: Left Throws: Right

MLB debut
- August 11, 2023, for the Oakland Athletics

MLB statistics (through September 23, 2026)
- Batting average: .240
- Home runs: 64
- Runs batted in: 191
- Stats at Baseball Reference

Teams
- Oakland Athletics / Athletics (2023–present)

Lawrence Evan Butler (born July 10, 2000) is an American professional baseball outfielder for the Athletics of Major League Baseball (MLB). He made his MLB debut in 2023.

== Career ==
Butler was born in Burlington, New Jersey. He attended Westlake High School in Atlanta, Georgia, and played in a league and team founded by Marquis Grissom, alongside Michael Harris II.

The Oakland Athletics selected Butler in the sixth round, with the 173rd overall selection, of the 2018 Major League Baseball draft. Butler made his professional debut that year with the rookie–level Arizona League Athletics, hitting .226 in 46 games. Butler spent the 2019 season with the Low–A Vermont Lake Monsters. He played in 55 games for the team, struggling to a .177/.276/.287 with 4 home runs and 22 RBI.

Butler did not play in a game in 2020 due to the cancellation of the Minor League Baseball season because of the COVID-19 pandemic. He returned to action in 2021, playing for the Single–A Stockton Ports and High–A Lansing Lugnuts. In 102 games between the two teams, he batted .273/.367/.504 with career–highs in home runs (19), RBI (75), and stolen bases (29). In 2022, Butler spent the year with Lansing, hitting .270/.357/.468 with 11 home runs, 41 RBI, and 13 stolen bases. On November 15, 2022, the Athletics added Butler to their 40-man roster to protect him from the Rule 5 draft.

Butler was optioned to the Double-A Midland RockHounds to begin the 2023 season. In 89 games split between Midland and the Triple–A Las Vegas Aviators, he batted a cumulative .284/.350/.475 with 15 home runs, 70 RBI, and 21 stolen bases.

On August 11, 2023, Butler was promoted to the major leagues for the first time.

Butler started the 2024 season in the major leagues but struggled early and was demoted to Triple-A Las Vegas. He was called back up to the majors in June and rebounded, finishing with a .262 average in 125 games.

On March 6, 2025, Butler signed a seven-year, $65.5 million contract extension with the Athletics through 2031 with a club option for the 2032 season. He made 152 appearances for the team during the regular season, hitting .234/.306/.404 with 21 home runs, 63 RBI, and 22 stolen bases. On October 3, it was announced that Butler had undergone surgery to repair the patellar tendon in his right knee; he also received a platelet-rich plasma injection to address patellar tendinitis in his left knee.
