= Noah Murdock =

American baseball player (born 1998)

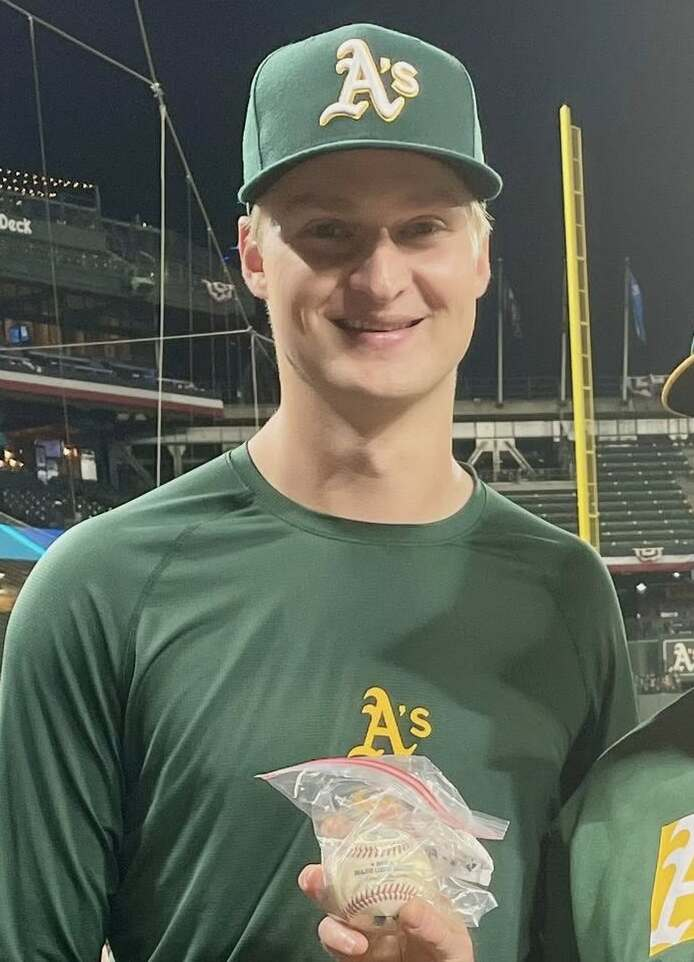
- Murdock with the Athletics in 2025

Free agent
- Pitcher
- Born: August 20, 1998 (age 28); Richmond, Virginia, U.S.
- Bats: Right Throws: Right

MLB debut
- March 29, 2025, for the Athletics

MLB statistics (through 2026 season)
- Win–loss record: 1–1
- Earned run average: 11.07
- Strikeouts: 25
- Stats at Baseball Reference

Teams
- Athletics (2025); Pittsburgh Pirates (2026)

Noah James Murdock (born August 20, 1998) is an American professional baseball pitcher who is a free agent. He has previously played in Major League Baseball (MLB) for the Athletics and Pittsburgh Pirates. He made his MLB debut in 2025.

== Career ==
=== Amateur ===
Murdock attended Colonial Heights High School in Colonial Heights, Virginia. The Washington Nationals selected him in the 38th round of the 2016 MLB draft, but he chose to honor his commitment to attend the University of Virginia to play college baseball for the Virginia Cavaliers.

=== Kansas City Royals ===
The Kansas City Royals drafted Murdock in the seventh round, with the 199th overall selection, of the 2019 Major League Baseball draft. He made his professional debut with the rookie–level Burlington Royals, recording a 2.17 ERA with 43 strikeouts over 11 appearances. Murdock did not play in a game in 2020 due to the cancellation of the minor league season because of the COVID-19 pandemic.

Murdock returned to action in 2021 with the High–A Quad Cities River Bandits, making 7 appearances (6 starts) and posting a 3.18 ERA with 19 strikeouts across 22 2/3 innings pitched. He split the 2022 campaign between Quad Cities and the Double–A Northwest Arkansas Naturals. In 17 starts split between the two affiliates, he struggled to an 0–7 record and 6.91 ERA with 64 strikeouts across 70 1/3 innings of work.

Murdock returned to Northwest Arkansas in 2023, making 36 appearances and logging a 5.87 ERA with 77 strikeouts over 69 innings pitched. In 2024, he split time between Northwest Arkansas and the Triple–A Omaha Storm Chasers. In 46 combined appearances out of the bullpen, Murdock accumulated a 3.16 ERA with 72 strikeouts across 62 2/3 innings.

=== Athletics ===
On December 11, 2024, the Athletics selected Murdock from the Royals in the Rule 5 draft. On March 17, 2025, manager Mark Kotsay announced that Murdock had made the team's Opening Day roster. In 14 appearances for the Athletics, he struggled to a 13.24 ERA with 21 strikeouts across 17 innings pitched. Murdock was designated for assignment following the promotion of Elvis Alvarado on May 9.

=== Kansas City Royals (second stint) ===
On May 12, 2025, Murdock was returned to the Kansas City Royals organization. He made 16 appearances for the Triple-A Omaha Storm Chasers, but struggled to an 0-2 record and 6.00 ERA with 20 strikeouts over 21 innings of work. Murdock elected free agency following the season on November 6.

=== Pittsburgh Pirates ===
On November 14, 2025, Murdock signed a minor league contract with the Pittsburgh Pirates. In 24 appearances split between the Single-A Bradenton Marauders, Double-A Altoona Curve, and Triple-A Indianapolis Indians, he posted a cumulative 2-2 record and 4.11 ERA with 39 strikeouts and one save across 30 2/3 innings pitched. On July 5, 2026, the Pirates selected Murdock's contract and optioned him back to Indianapolis. On November 20, 2026, he was non-tendered by the Pirates and became a free agent.

== See also ==
- Rule 5 draft results
