= Max Muncy (baseball, born 2002) =

American baseball player (born 2002)

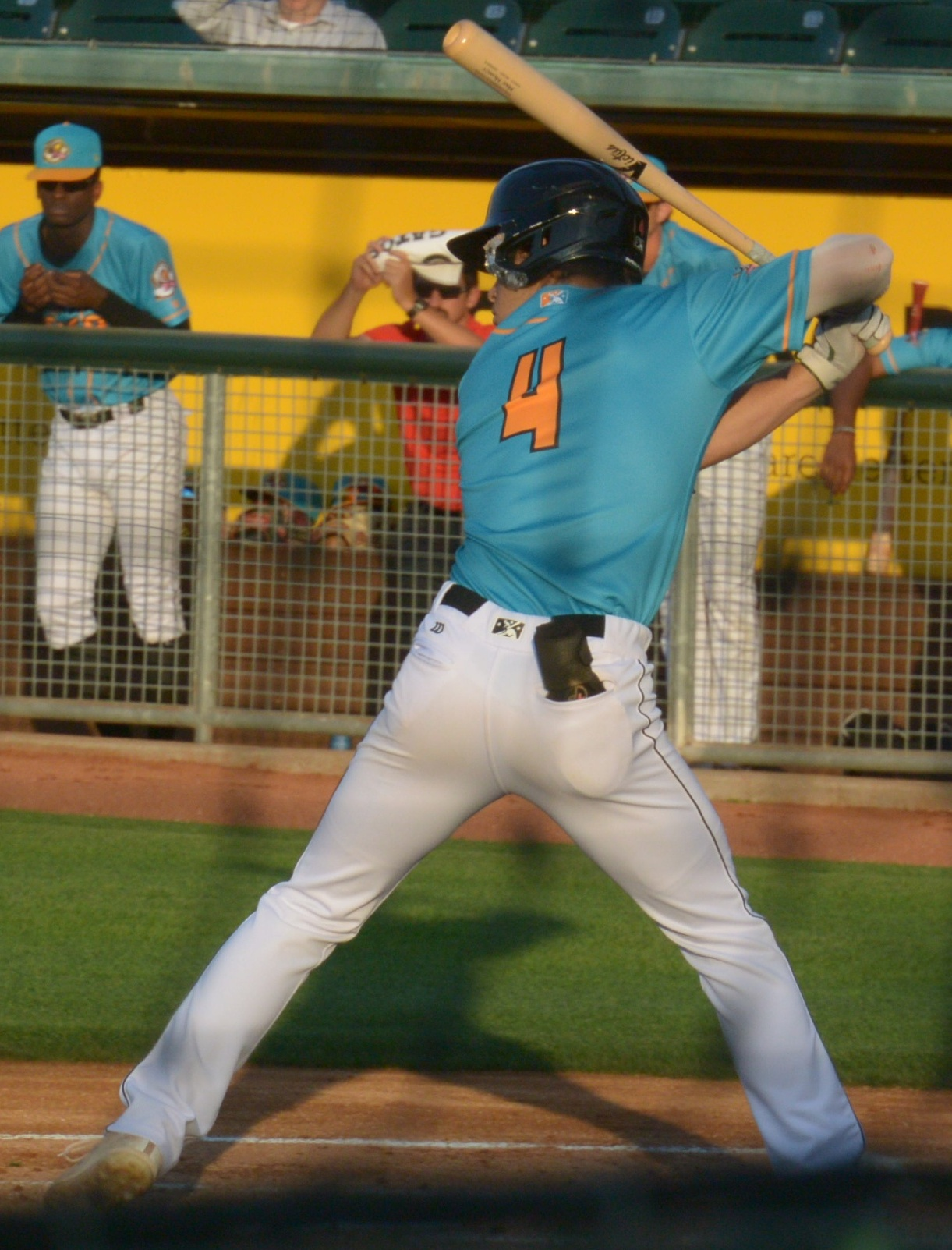
- Muncy with the Lansing Lugnuts in 2022

Athletics – No. 3
- Infielder
- Born: August 25, 2002 (age 24); Camarillo, California, U.S.
- Bats: Right Throws: Right

MLB debut
- March 27, 2025, for the Athletics

MLB statistics (through 2026 season)
- Batting average: .223
- Home runs: 18
- Runs batted in: 53
- Stats at Baseball Reference

Teams
- Athletics (2025–present)

Maxwell Price Muncy (born August 25, 2002) is an American professional baseball infielder for the Athletics of Major League Baseball (MLB). He was selected in the first round of the 2021 MLB draft by the Athletics and made his MLB debut in 2025.

== Early life and amateur career ==
Muncy grew up in Camarillo, California, and attended Thousand Oaks High School. His father Mike Muncy played college baseball and was drafted three times between 1991 and 1993, but never played professionally. He made the varsity baseball team as a freshman and hit for .382 average with 13 extra-base hits as a sophomore. As a senior, Muncy batted .469 with 45 hits, 49 RBIs and 11 home runs, and scored 34 runs in 28 games played and was named the Baseball Player of the Year by the Los Angeles Times and Los Angeles Daily News. Muncy committed to play college baseball at the University of Arkansas.

== Professional career ==
The Oakland Athletics selected Muncy in the first round, with the 25th overall selection, in the 2021 Major League Baseball draft. He signed with Oakland for a $2.85 million bonus. He made his professional debut with the Rookie-level Arizona Complex League Athletics, hitting .129/.206/.129 with four hits, 12 strikeouts, three walks, and four RBI over 31 at-bats.

Muncy opened the 2022 season with the Stockton Ports of the Single-A California League. Muncy batted .230 with 16 doubles, 16 home runs, and 51 RBI in 81 games with Stockton before being promoted to the Lansing Lugnuts of the High-A Midwest League. Muncy split the 2023 campaign between Lansing and the Double-A Midland RockHounds. In 123 appearances for the two affiliates, he hit a combined .275/.353/.411 with 10 home runs, 62 RBI, and 13 stolen bases.

Muncy was assigned to the Triple-A Las Vegas Aviators for the start of the 2024 season. He met and played in the same game against the Los Angeles Dodgers' Max Muncy who was on an injury rehab assignment with Oklahoma City at Las Vegas Ballpark on August 13. The two men were born exactly twelve years apart but are not related. In 50 games for Las Vegas, Muncy hit .278/.374/.491 with eight home runs, 33 RBI, and four stolen bases.

On March 27, 2025, the Athletics selected Muncy's contract after he made the team's Opening Day roster. The next day, he hit his first career home run off of Tayler Saucedo of the Seattle Mariners.
