= Osvaldo Bido =

Dominican baseball player (born 1995)

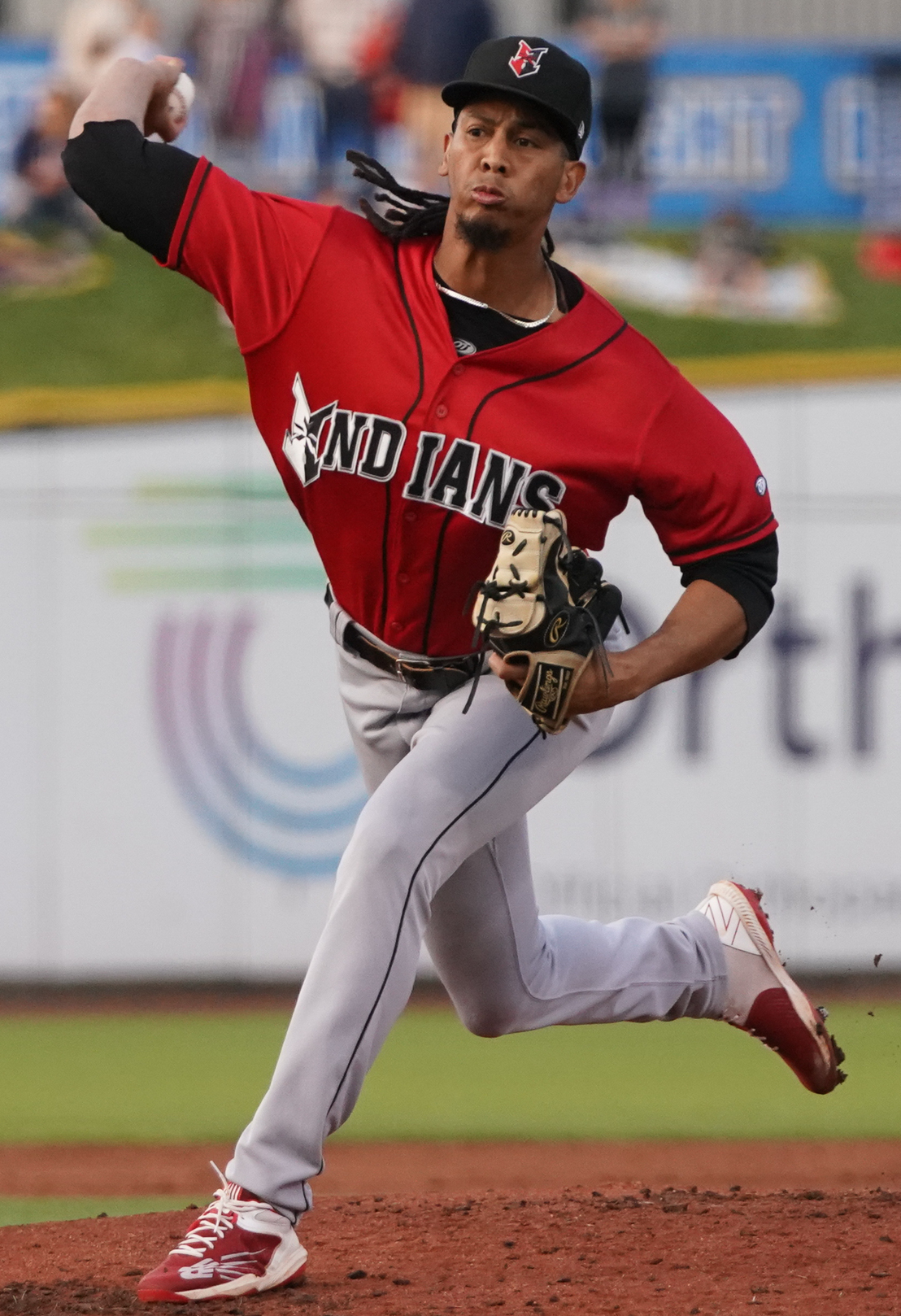
- Bido with the Indianapolis Indians in 2022

Yokohama DeNA BayStars – No. 42
- Pitcher
- Born: October 18, 1995 (age 31); Los Hidalgos, Dominican Republic
- Bats: Right Throws: Right

Professional debut
- MLB: June 14, 2023, for the Pittsburgh Pirates
- NPB: July 25, 2026, for the Yokohama DeNA BayStars

MLB statistics (through May 6, 2026)
- Win–loss record: 11–13
- Earned run average: 5.17
- Strikeouts: 190

NPB statistics (through August 6, 2026)
- Win-loss record: 1–1
- Earned run average: 10.29
- Strikeouts: 7
- Stats at Baseball Reference

Teams
- Pittsburgh Pirates (2023); Oakland Athletics / Athletics (2024–2025); Atlanta Braves (2026); Chicago White Sox (2026); Yokohama DeNA BayStars (2026–present)

Osvaldo Bido (born October 18, 1995) is a Dominican professional baseball pitcher for the Yokohama DeNA BayStars of Nippon Professional Baseball (NPB). He has previously played in Major League Baseball (MLB) for the Pittsburgh Pirates, Oakland Athletics / Athletics, Atlanta Braves, and Chicago White Sox. He made his MLB debut in 2023.

== Career ==
=== Pittsburgh Pirates ===
The Pittsburgh Pirates signed Bido as an international free agent on March 14, 2017. He spent his first professional season with the Dominican Summer League Pirates, posting a 1–8 record and 5.33 ERA across 15 contests. In 2018, he made 14 starts for the Low–A West Virginia Black Bears, registering a 4–6 record and 4.18 ERA with 58 strikeouts across 75 1/3 innings of work. Bido began the 2019 season with the Single–A Greensboro Grasshoppers, and was promoted to the High–A Bradenton Marauders in July. In 25 combined starts, he accumulated a 12–8 record and 3.32 ERA with 107 strikeouts in 135 2/3 innings pitched.

Bido did not play a game in 2020 due to the cancellation of the Minor League Baseball season because of the COVID-19 pandemic. He returned to action in 2021, splitting the year between the Double–A Altoona Curve and Triple–A Indianapolis Indians. In 23 games (21 starts) Bido recorded a 4–8 record and 5.33 ERA with 98 strikeouts across 101 1/3 innings of work. Bido remained with Indianapolis for the entirety of the 2022 season, making 32 appearances and working to a 3–8 record and 4.53 ERA with a career–high 122 strikeouts in 111 1/3 innings pitched.

Bido began the 2023 season back with Triple–A Indianapolis. In 12 games (10 starts), he registered a 3–4 record and 4.55 ERA with 56 strikeouts in 55 1/3 innings pitched. On June 14, 2023, Bido was selected to the 40-man roster and promoted to the major leagues for the first time. In 16 appearances for Pittsburgh, he logged a 2–5 record and 5.86 ERA with 48 strikeouts across 50 2/3 inning pitched. On November 17, the Pirates non–tendered Bido, making him a free agent.

=== Oakland Athletics / Athletics ===
On November 20, 2023, Bido signed a major league contract with the Oakland Athletics, paying him $750,000. He was optioned to the Triple–A Las Vegas Aviators to begin the 2024 season. The Athletics promoted him to the major leagues to start one game of a doubleheader on May 8. Bido made 16 appearances (nine starts) for Oakland during the year, compiling a 5–3 record and 3.41 ERA with 63 strikeouts across 63 1/3 innings pitched.

Bido made 26 appearances (10 starts) for the Athletics during the 2025 campaign, registering a 2–5 record and 5.87 ERA with 68 strikeouts and one save across 79 2/3 innings pitched.

=== Atlanta Braves ===
On December 5, 2025, Bido was claimed off waivers by the Atlanta Braves. He was designated for assignment on December 15, following the signing of Ha-seong Kim. On December 19, Bido was claimed off waivers by the Tampa Bay Rays. He was designated for assignment by the Rays on January 12, 2026. On January 16, Bido was claimed off waivers by the Miami Marlins. He was designated for assignment by Miami on January 20. Bido was claimed off waivers by the Los Angeles Angels on January 27, but was subsequently designated for assignment two days later. On February 5, Bido was claimed off waivers for a fifth time, this time by the New York Yankees. On March 24, Bido was claimed back off waivers by the Braves. In six appearances for Atlanta, he logged a 1–0 record and 6.30 ERA with six strikeouts and one save across 10 innings pitched. On April 16, Bido was designated for assignment by the Braves.

=== Chicago White Sox ===
On April 18, 2026, Bido was claimed off waivers by the Chicago White Sox. He made five appearances for Chicago, registering a 1–0 record and 6.23 ERA with five strikeouts across 8 2/3 innings pitched. On May 8, Bido was designated for assignment by the White Sox. He cleared waivers and was sent outright to the Triple-A Charlotte Knights on May 11. Bido was released by the White Sox organization on May 19, in order to pursue an opportunity in Japan.

=== Yokohama DeNA BayStars ===
On June 11, 2026, Bido signed with the Yokohama DeNA BayStars of Nippon Professional Baseball.
