= Tyler Ferguson =

American baseball player (born 1993)

Chicago Cubs – No. 64
- Pitcher
- Born: October 5, 1993 (age 32); Fresno, California, U.S.
- Bats: Right Throws: Right

MLB debut
- May 7, 2024, for the Oakland Athletics

MLB statistics (through September 1, 2026)
- Win–loss record: 8–5
- Earned run average: 4.36
- Strikeouts: 137
- Stats at Baseball Reference

Teams
- Oakland Athletics / Athletics (2024–2026); Chicago Cubs (2026–present)

Tyler Clark Ferguson (born October 5, 1993) is an American professional baseball pitcher for the Chicago Cubs of Major League Baseball (MLB). He has previously played in MLB for the Oakland Athletics / Athletics.

== Career ==
=== Amateur career ===
Ferguson attended Clovis West High School in Fresno, California and then went on to Vanderbilt University for his college baseball career with the Vanderbilt Commodores. As a part time starting pitcher, he contributed to the 2013 Southeastern Conference championship squad, the 2014 College World Series championship squad, and the 2015 College World Series runner-ups.

=== Texas Rangers ===
The Texas Rangers selected Ferguson in the sixth round, with the 168th overall selection, of the 2015 Major League Baseball draft, and he signed. He made his professional debut with the rookie–level Arizona League Rangers.

Ferguson split the 2016 season between the Low–A Spokane Indians and Single–A Hickory Crawdads. In 23 appearances, he combined for a 3.92 ERA and 56 strikeouts across 43 2/3 innings pitched. Ferguson split 2017 between Hickory and the High–A Down East Wood Ducks, but struggled to a 2–6 record and 6.61 ERA with 57 strikeouts across 36 appearances.

Ferguson once again played for Hickory and Down East in 2018, registering a 4.76 ERA with 14 strikeouts in 14 games. He was released by the Rangers organization on March 19, 2019.

=== Trois-Rivières Aigles ===
On April 5, 2019, Ferguson signed with the Trois-Rivières Aigles of the Can-Am League. In 45 outings for the Aigles, Ferguson compiled a 3–5 record and 4.75 ERA with 55 strikeouts across 55 innings of work.

=== Los Angeles Dodgers ===
On February 23, 2020, Ferguson signed a minor league contract with the Los Angeles Dodgers. He did not play in a game in 2020 due to the cancellation of the minor league season because of the COVID-19 pandemic. Ferguson was released by the Dodgers organization on July 1.

=== Chicago Dogs ===
On April 13, 2021, Ferguson signed with the Chicago Dogs of the American Association of Professional Baseball. In nine appearances for the Dogs, Ferguson recorded a 3.14 ERA with 11 strikeouts across 14 1/3 innings pitched.

=== Atlanta Braves ===
On June 17, 2021, Ferguson's contract was purchased by the Atlanta Braves organization. He spent the remainder of the season split between the High–A Rome Braves and Double–A Mississippi Braves. In 22 appearances between the two affiliates, Ferguson compiled a 6–4 record and 2.23 ERA with 33 strikeouts across 32 1/3 innings.

In 2022, Ferguson made 52 appearances split between Mississippi and the Triple–A Gwinnett Stripers, posting a combined 4.80 ERA with 64 strikeouts in 50 2/3 innings of work. He elected free agency following the season on November 10, 2022.

=== Arizona Diamondbacks ===
On December 9, 2022, Ferguson signed a minor league contract with the Arizona Diamondbacks organization. He spent the year with the Triple–A Reno Aces, pitching in 51 games and logging a 5.49 ERA with 86 strikeouts across 78 2/3 innings. Ferguson elected free agency following the season on November 6, 2023.

=== Oakland Athletics / Athletics ===
On November 15, 2023, Ferguson signed a minor league contract with the Oakland Athletics. In 14 games for the Triple–A Las Vegas Aviators, he recorded a 2.40 ERA with 24 strikeouts and four saves across 15 innings pitched.

On May 7, 2024, Ferguson was selected to the 40-man roster and promoted to the major leagues for the first time. On July 25, Ferguson earned his first career save, striking out two batters in a scoreless ninth inning against the Los Angeles Angels. He made 48 appearances out of the bullpen during his rookie campaign, compiling a 4–2 record and 3.68 ERA with 62 strikeouts and two saves across 51 1/3 innings pitched. Ferguson made 56 relief appearances for the Athletics during the 2025 season, accumulating a 4–2 record and 4.66 ERA with 54 strikeouts and two saves over 58 innings of work.

Ferguson was optioned to Triple-A Las Vegas to begin the 2026 season. He made one appearance for the Athletics on May 5, 2026, allowing four runs on four hits in 1 1/3 innings of relief against the Philadelphia Phillies. The following day, Ferguson was designated for assignment by the Athletics.

=== Chicago Cubs ===
On May 7, 2026, the Athletics traded Ferguson to the Chicago Cubs in exchange for cash considerations.
