= Willie MacIver =

American baseball player (born 1996)

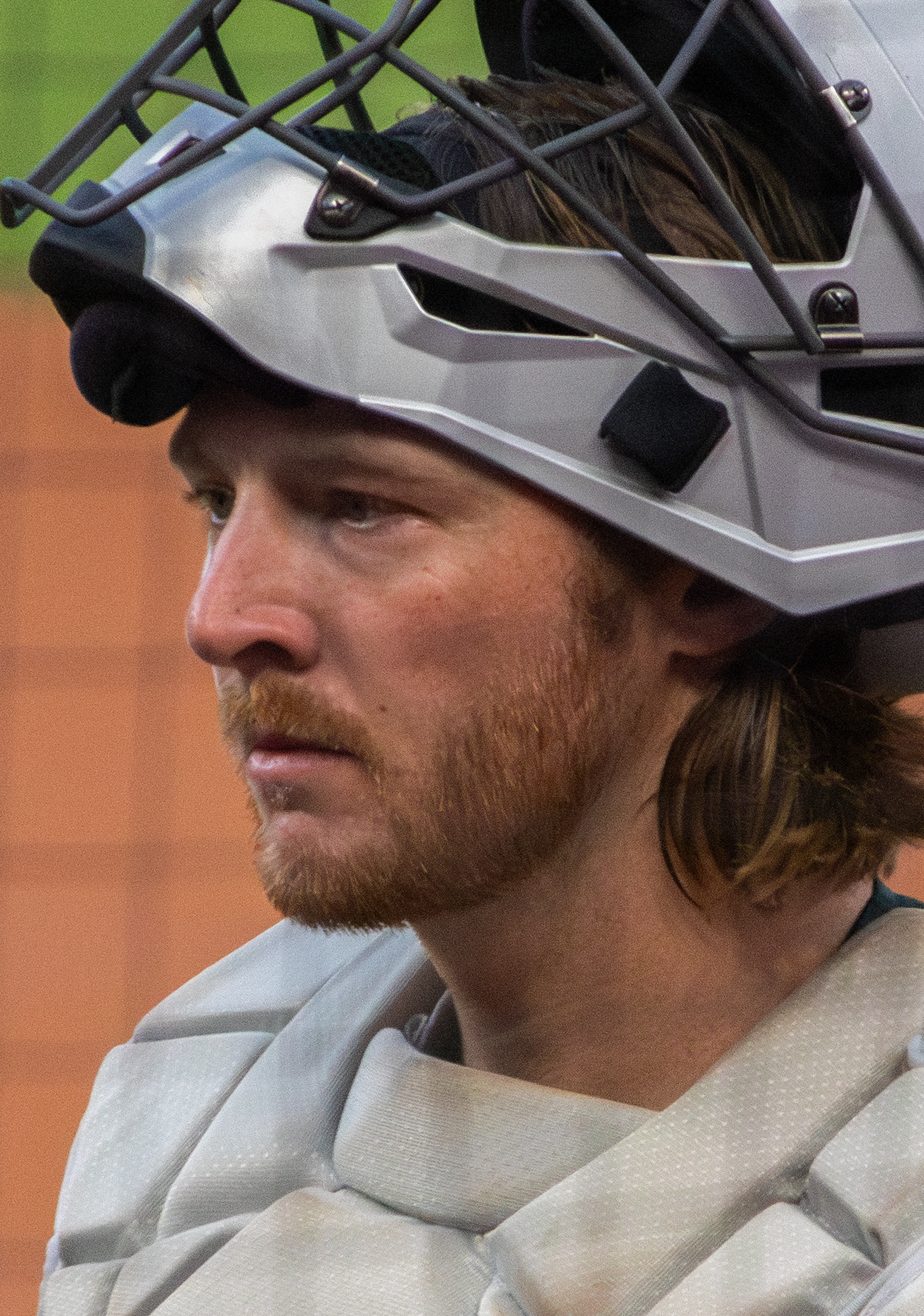
- MacIver with the Athletics in 2025

Seattle Mariners
- Catcher
- Born: October 28, 1996 (age 29); Pleasant Hill, California, U.S.
- Bats: Right Throws: Right

MLB debut
- May 25, 2025, for the Athletics

MLB statistics (through 2025 season)
- Batting average: .186
- Home runs: 3
- Runs batted in: 9
- Stats at Baseball Reference

Teams
- Athletics (2025)
Medals
Men's baseball
Representing United States
WBSC Premier12
Bronze medal – third place	2024 Tokyo	Team

William MacIver (/məˈkaɪvər/; born October 28, 1996) is an American professional baseball catcher for the Seattle Mariners of Major League Baseball (MLB). He has previously played in MLB for the Athletics. He made his MLB debut in 2025.

== Career ==
=== Amateur career ===
MacIver attended College Park High School in Pleasant Hill, California, and the University of Washington, where he played college baseball for the Washington Huskies for three seasons. In 2017, he played collegiate summer baseball with the Wareham Gatemen of the Cape Cod Baseball League, and was named a league all-star.

=== Colorado Rockies ===
MacIver was drafted by the Colorado Rockies in the ninth round, with the 276th overall selection, of the 2018 Major League Baseball draft. After signing with the team he was assigned to the Boise Hawks of the Low–A Northwest League. MacIver played for the Single–A Asheville Tourists in 2019, where he was voted the best catcher in the South Atlantic League after batting .252 with 13 home runs and 60 RBI in 117 games played. He did not play in a game in 2020 due to the cancellation of the minor league season because of the COVID-19 pandemic, but was later assigned to the Rockies' alternate training site. MacIver was assigned to the Spokane Indians of the High-A West League to begin the 2021 season. He was promoted to the Double–A Hartford Yard Goats after batting .286 with 10 home runs in 46 games in Spokane. In June 2021, MacIver was selected to play in the All-Star Futures Game.

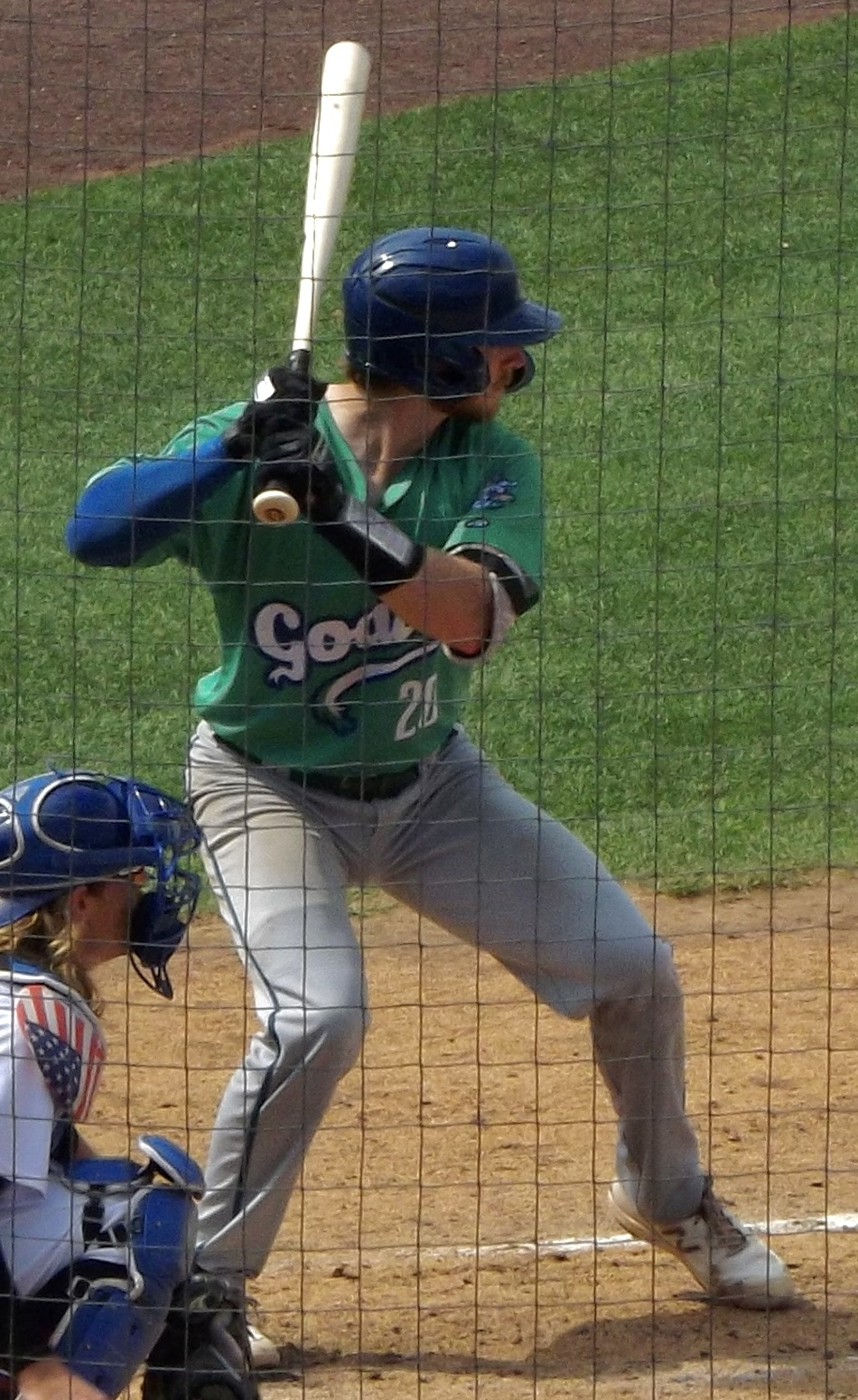
MacIver with the Hartford Yard Goats in 2022

He split the 2022 season between Double-A Hartford and the Triple-A Albuquerque Isotopes, slashing a cumulative .226/.309/.398 with 15 home runs, 50 RBI, and 10 stolen bases. On March 29, 2023, it was announced that MacIver would miss 6–8 weeks after receiving an anti-inflammatory injection in his right shoulder. In 62 total games split between Albuquerque and the rookie–level Arizona Complex League Rockies, he slashed .272/.416/.416 with three home runs, 34 RBI, and 16 stolen bases.

MacIver spent the entirety of the 2024 campaign with Triple–A Albuquerque, playing in 89 games and batting .297/.382/.530 with 15 home runs, 56 RBI, and nine stolen bases. He elected free agency following the season on November 4, 2024.

=== Athletics ===
On December 17, 2024, MacIver signed a minor league contract with the Athletics. He made 35 appearances for the Triple-A Las Vegas Aviators, batting .389/.469/.548 with two home runs, 30 RBI, and two stolen bases. On May 23, 2025, MacIver was promoted to the major leagues for the first time. MacIver faced the Philadelphia Phillies in his major league debut on May 25, driving in the winning run and catching Johan Rojas stealing for the final out of the game. On June 19, he hit his first career home run off of Colton Gordon of the Houston Astros. MacIver made 32 appearances for the Athletics during his rookie campaign, batting .186/.252/.324 with three home runs, nine RBI, and three stolen bases.

=== Texas Rangers ===
On November 5, 2025, MacIver was claimed off waivers by the Texas Rangers. MacIver was optioned to the Triple-A Round Rock Express to begin the 2026 season. He made 14 appearances for Round Rock, batting .170/.333/.255 with one home run, six RBI, and one stolen base. MacIver was designated for assignment by the Rangers on April 23, 2026.

=== Toronto Blue Jays ===
On April 24, 2026, MacIver was traded to the Toronto Blue Jays in exchange for cash considerations. He made 60 appearances for the Triple–A Buffalo Bisons, slashing .270/.344/.460 with seven home runs, 44 RBI, and four stolen bases. MacIver was designated for assignment by the Blue Jays on August 10.

=== Seattle Mariners ===
On August 12, 2026, MacIver was claimed off of waivers by the Seattle Mariners.
