= Jeffrey Springs =

American baseball player (born 1992)

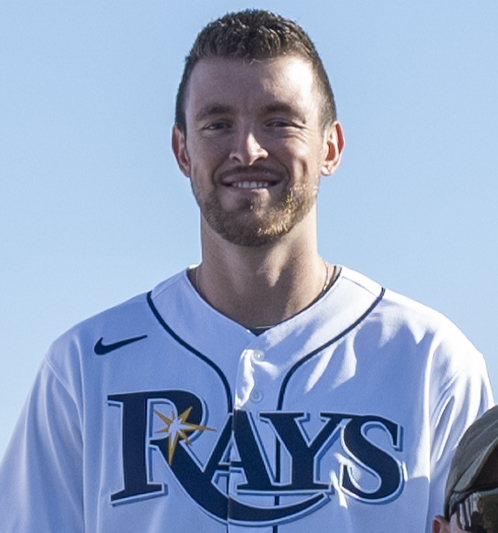
- Springs with the Tampa Bay Rays in 2023

Free agent
- Pitcher
- Born: September 20, 1992 (age 34); Belmont, North Carolina, U.S.
- Bats: Left Throws: Left

MLB debut
- July 31, 2018, for the Texas Rangers

MLB statistics (through 2026 season)
- Win–loss record: 38–37
- Earned run average: 4.22
- Strikeouts: 609
- Stats at Baseball Reference

Teams
- Texas Rangers (2018–2019); Boston Red Sox (2020); Tampa Bay Rays (2021–2024); Athletics (2025–2026)

Jeffrey Scott Springs (born September 20, 1992) is an American professional baseball pitcher who is a free agent. He has previously played in Major League Baseball (MLB) for the Texas Rangers, Boston Red Sox, Tampa Bay Rays, and Athletics.

== Career ==
Springs attended South Point High School in Belmont, North Carolina. While at South Point, he helped lead the baseball team to the 2011 North Carolina 3A state title, and was also named MVP of the 3A championship series. He attended Appalachian State University, pursuing a degree in management and played college baseball for the Mountaineers for four years (2012–2015). Springs was drafted by the Texas Rangers in the 30th round of the 2015 MLB draft and signed with them for a $1,000 signing bonus.

=== Texas Rangers ===
After signing, Springs split the season between the Spokane Indians and Hickory Crawdads. He posted a combined 2–2 record with a 2.61 ERA in 31 innings. He split the 2016 season between two levels, with the Hickory Crawdads going 1–1 with a 1.16 ERA in 18 games and struggling in a promotion to the High Desert Mavericks, going 2–2 with a 5.36 ERA in 13 games (9 starts}. Springs spent 2017 with the Down East Wood Ducks, going 2–8 with a 3.69 ERA with 146 strikeouts in 112 1/3 innings in 31 games (17 starts). Springs opened the 2018 season with the Frisco RoughRiders of the Texas League, producing a 3–2 record with a 4.82 ERA in 37 1/3 innings. Springs was promoted to the Round Rock Express of the Pacific Coast League, producing a 1–2 record with a 2.79 ERA in 19.1 innings.

Springs was promoted to the major leagues for the first time on July 31, 2018, and made his major league debut that night, striking out A.J. Pollock for his first major league strikeout. Springs finished his rookie season after producing a 1–1 record with a 3.38 ERA in 32 major league innings. In 2019, Springs made the Rangers opening day roster. Springs missed close to two months due to left biceps tendinitis. He finished the 2019 season going 4–1 with a 6.40 ERA over 32 1/3 innings for Texas.

On December 2, 2019, Springs was designated for assignment. On December 13, Springs re-signed with Texas on a one-year major league contract.

=== Boston Red Sox ===
On January 15, 2020, Springs was traded to the Boston Red Sox in exchange for Sam Travis. On March 26, the team optioned Springs to the Triple-A Pawtucket Red Sox. Springs made his debut with Boston in the team's fourth game of the delayed-start 2020 season, allowing five runs on four hits and a walk in 1 1/3 innings of relief against the New York Mets on July 27. He was optioned to and from the team's alternate training site during August and September. Overall with the 2020 Red Sox, Springs appeared in 16 games, all in relief, compiling an 0–2 record with 7.08 ERA and 28 strikeouts in 20 1/3 innings pitched. On February 16, 2021, Springs was designated for assignment by Boston following the signing of Hirokazu Sawamura.

=== Tampa Bay Rays ===
On February 17, 2021, the Red Sox traded Springs and Chris Mazza to the Tampa Bay Rays in exchange for Ronaldo Hernández and Nick Sogard. He made a career-high 43 appearances for Tampa Bay in 2021, pitching to a 5-1 record and 3.43 ERA with 63 strikeouts in 44 2/3 innings of work. On August 16, Springs underwent season-ending surgery to repair an ACL tear in his right knee and was placed on the 60-day injured list.

Springs made 33 appearances (25 of them starts) for the Rays in 2022, posting a 9-5 record and career-best 2.46 ERA while striking out 144 in 135 1/3 innings pitched. On June 4, 2022, Springs, along with 4 other Rays teammates, opted out of wearing a Rays team logo and cap in support of LGBTQ+ Pride, during the team's annual Pride Night celebration at Tropicana Field.

On January 25, 2023, Springs agreed to a four-year, $31 million contract extension with the Rays. On April 13, Springs exited the set after left arm ulnar neuritis. He was placed on the 10-day injured list due to ulnar inflammation. On April 22, it was revealed that Springs would undergo Tommy John surgery, which prematurely ended his 2023 season.

On July 28, 2024, Springs was activated from the injured list to make his return from surgery. He made 7 starts for the Rays down the stretch, logging a 2–2 record and 3.27 ERA with 37 strikeouts across 33 innings pitched.

=== Athletics ===
On December 14, 2024, the Rays traded Springs and Jacob Lopez to the Athletics for Joe Boyle, Will Simpson, Jacob Watters, and a Competitive Balance Round A pick in the 2025 MLB draft. On October 30, the Athletics declined their club option making him a free agent.
