= Jason Alexander (baseball) =

American baseball pitcher (born 1993)

Free agent
- Pitcher
- Born: March 1, 1993 (age 33); Windsor, California, U.S.
- Bats: Right Throws: Right

MLB debut
- June 1, 2022, for the Milwaukee Brewers

MLB statistics (through 2026 season)
- Win–loss record: 7–6
- Earned run average: 5.54
- Strikeouts: 125
- Stats at Baseball Reference

Teams
- Milwaukee Brewers (2022); Athletics (2025); Houston Astros (2025–2026)

Jason Raymond Alexander (born March 1, 1993) is an American professional baseball pitcher who is a free agent. He has previously played in MLB for the Milwaukee Brewers, Athletics and Houston Astros.

== Amateur career ==
Alexander went to high school at Cardinal Newman High School, in Santa Rosa, California, and attended college at California State University, Long Beach and Menlo College.

== Professional career ==
=== Los Angeles Angels ===
Alexander signed with the Los Angeles Angels as an undrafted free agent on June 19, 2017. He finished his first pro campaign having appeared in 18 games split between the Orem Owlz, Arizona League Angels, and High-A Inland Empire 66ers. He pitched to a cumulative 2–1 record and 3.50 ERA with 37 strikeouts in 43.2 innings of work. In 2018, Alexander split the year between Inland Empire, the Double-A Mobile BayBears, and Triple-A Salt Lake Bees. In 24 total games (21 starts), he pitched to a 4–10 record and 4.41 ERA with 95 strikeouts in 116.1 innings of work.

In 2019, he played with Mobile and Salt Lake, accumulating a 4–8 record and 6.66 ERA with 96 strikeouts in 101.1 innings pitched spanning 23 games (15 starts). Alexander did not play in a game in 2020 due to the cancellation of the minor league season because of the COVID-19 pandemic. On June 5, 2020, Alexander was released by the Angels.

=== Miami Marlins ===
On April 21, 2021, Alexander signed a minor league contract with the Miami Marlins. He spent the majority of his season with Triple-A Jacksonville Jumbo Shrimp. With scoreless appearances in a game apiece for the Florida Complex League Marlins and Double-A Pensacola Blue Wahoos, Alexander pitched to a 1.84 ERA with 18 strikeouts in 5 games (4 starts) for Jacksonville. He elected free agency following the season on November 7.

=== Milwaukee Brewers ===
On November 19, 2021, Alexander signed a minor league contract with the Milwaukee Brewers organization. He was assigned to the Triple-A Nashville Sounds to begin the 2022 season.

Alexander was promoted to the Major Leagues on June 1, and made his debut later that day. He finished the major league season with 18 appearances, 11 of which were starts, and a 5.90 ERA. In 2022 in Triple-A he was 8–2 with a 2.84 ERA in 63.1 innings.

On February 18, 2023, Alexander was placed on the 60-day injured list with a strained right rotator cuff. He was activated on July 8 and optioned to Triple–A Nashville. On July 24, Alexander was removed from the 40-man roster and sent outright to Triple–A. In 19 minor league games (11 starts), he posted a 2–4 record and 6.14 ERA with 44 strikeouts across 63.0 innings of work. Alexander elected free agency following the season on November 6.

=== Boston Red Sox ===
On February 27, 2024, Alexander signed a minor league contract with the Boston Red Sox. In 29 games (27 starts) for the Triple–A Worcester Red Sox, he compiled a 7–6 record and 4.42 ERA with 129 strikeouts across 138 1/3 innings pitched. Alexander elected free agency following the season on November 4.

=== Athletics ===
On November 15, 2024, Alexander signed a minor league contract with the Athletics. He began the 2025 season with the Triple-A Las Vegas Aviators. On April 7, 2025, the Athletics selected Alexander's contract, adding him to their active roster. In four appearances for the team, he struggled to an 18.00 ERA with five strikeouts over six innings of work. On May 16, Alexander was designated for assignment by the Athletics.

=== Houston Astros ===
On May 18, 2025, Alexander was claimed off waivers by the Houston Astros. Inserted into the Astros' starting rotation depleted by injury, on August 4, Alexander hurled six scoreless innings at LoanDepot Park to lead an 8–2 win over the Miami Marlins. This performance accounted for the longest scoreless outing of Alexander's career to date. At Yankee Stadium on August 10, Alexander tossed another six shutout innings after having started the first 5 1/3 without surrendering any hits to lead a 7–1 win over the New York Yankees. In 2025, Alexander appeared in 14 games for Houston, 13 of which were starts, and went 4-2 with a 3.66 ERA in that span.

Alexander was optioned to the Triple-A Sugar Land Space Cowboys to begin the 2026 season. He was designated for assignment on September 24. He cleared waivers and was sent outright to Triple-A Sugar Land Space Cowboys on September 27. He elected free agency on October 3.

== Personal life ==
Alexander is the son of Richard and Maryann Alexander. He has two brothers who played professional baseball. His brother, Stuart, played in the Miami Marlins organization from 2005-2010, and his brother Scott Alexander has played in various organizations.
