= Luis Morales (baseball) =

Cuban baseball player (born 2002)

Athletics – No. 19
- Pitcher
- Born: September 24, 2002 (age 23); Antilla, Cuba
- Bats: Right Throws: Right

MLB debut
- August 1, 2025, for the Athletics

MLB statistics (through July 31, 2026)
- Win–loss record: 4–5
- Earned run average: 5.85
- Strikeouts: 56
- Stats at Baseball Reference

Teams
- Athletics (2025–present)

Luis Danys Morales (born September 24, 2002) is a Cuban professional baseball pitcher for the Athletics of Major League Baseball (MLB). He made his MLB debut in 2025.

== Career ==
Morales was born in Cuba. He played for Gallos de Sancti Spíritus in Cuban National Series during the 2020–21 season, going 3–3 with a 5.95 ERA in 11 pitching appearances. While playing on the Cuba national team in the 2020 U-23 Baseball World Cup in Mexico City, Morales defected. He was ruled an international free agent by Major League Baseball for the 2023 MLB international signing period.

Morales was signed by the Oakland Athletics on January 16, 2023. He split his first affiliated season between the Dominican Summer League Athletics, rookie-level Arizona League Athletics, Single-A Stockton Ports, and High-A Lansing Lugnuts. In 14 appearances (13 starts) for the four affiliates, he compiled a combined 0-5 record and 2.86 ERA with 53 strikeouts over 44 innings of work. Morales returned to Lansing for the 2024 season, registering a 2-4 record and 4.22 ERA with 84 strikeouts over 81 innings of work.

Morales began the 2025 season with the Double-A Midland RockHounds, later receiving a promotion to the Triple-A Las Vegas Aviators. On August 1, 2025, Morales was selected to the 40-man roster and promoted to the major leagues for the first time. Morales recorded his first victory on August 16, allowing one run over fine innings against the Los Angeles Angels. Morales made the Athletics' Opening Day roster in 2026, and was sent to the minors on April 7.
