= Justin Sterner =

American baseball player (born 1996)

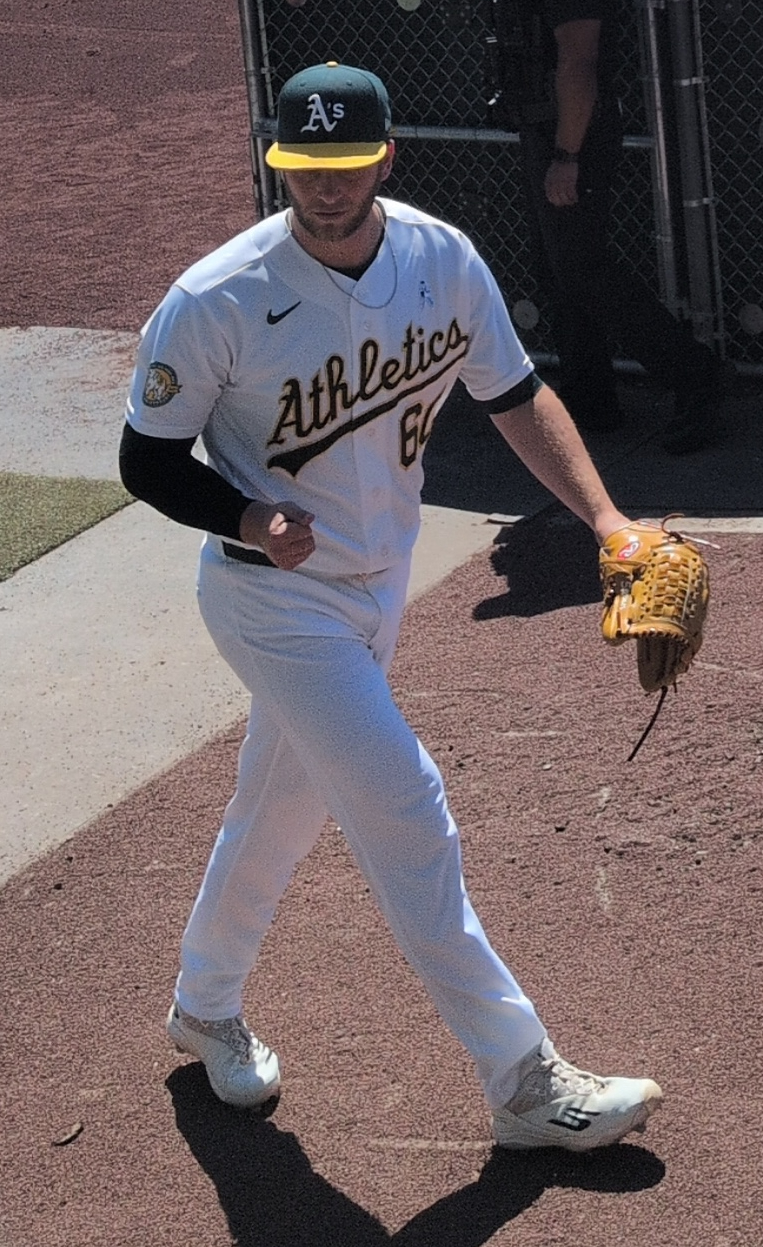
- Sterner in the bullpen at Sutter Health Park in 2026

Athletics – No. 60
- Pitcher
- Born: August 29, 1996 (age 30); La Jolla, California, U.S.
- Bats: Right Throws: Right

MLB debut
- May 31, 2024, for the Tampa Bay Rays

MLB statistics (through 2026 season)
- Win–loss record: 6–6
- Earned run average: 4.27
- Strikeouts: 114
- Stats at Baseball Reference

Teams
- Tampa Bay Rays (2024); Athletics (2025–present)

Justin James Sterner (born August 29, 1996) is an American professional baseball pitcher for the Athletics of Major League Baseball (MLB). He has previously played in MLB for the Tampa Bay Rays.

== Career ==
=== Amateur career ===
Sterner graduated from Dana Hills High School in Dana Point, California, and completed a two-year mission for the Church of Jesus Christ of Latter-day Saints in Apia, Samoa. He then attended Brigham Young University (BYU), where he played college baseball for the BYU Cougars.

=== Miami Marlins ===
On August 3, 2020, Sterner signed with the Miami Marlins as an undrafted free agent after he was not selected in the 2020 MLB draft. He did not play in a game in 2020 due to the cancellation of the minor league season because of the COVID-19 pandemic.

Sterner made his professional debut in 2021 with the Single–A Jupiter Hammerheads, for whom he posted a 1.38 ERA across seven appearances. He was later promoted to the High–A Beloit Snappers, and compiled a 7.36 ERA with 10 strikeouts in five games.

=== Tampa Bay Rays ===
On July 3, 2021, the Marlins traded Sterner and cash considerations to the Tampa Bay Rays in exchange for David Hess. He finished the season playing with the High–A Bowling Green Hot Rods and Double–A Montgomery Biscuits.

Sterner split the 2022 campaign between Montgomery and the Triple–A Durham Bulls. In 38 appearances for the two affiliates, he accumulated a 6–2 record and 3.94 ERA with 65 strikeouts across 48 innings of work. Sterner played 2023 back with Montgomery and Durham, combining for a 5.27 ERA with 71 strikeouts and three saves in 34 total appearances.

Sterner began the 2024 season in Durham, compiling a 3.60 ERA with 33 strikeouts across 25 innings pitched. On May 31, 2024, Sterner was selected to the 40-man roster and promoted to the major leagues for the first time. He made two appearances during his rookie campaign, allowing two runs (one earned) on five hits with four strikeouts over four innings pitched.

=== Athletics ===
On November 4, 2024, Sterner was claimed off waivers by the Athletics. On April 25, 2025, Sterner recorded his first career win after tossing 1 1/3 scoreless innings against the Chicago White Sox. He did not give up a run in his first 18 2/3 innings pitched for the Athletics. Sterner made 59 appearances (including one start) for the team, compiling a 4–3 record and 3.18 ERA with 70 strikeouts over 65 innings of work.

Sterner made 46 appearances out of the bullpen for the Athletics during the 2026 season, accumulating a 2–3 record and 6.12 ERA with 40 strikeouts and one save across 42 2/3 innings pitched. On August 15, 2026, it was announced that Sterner had undergone a season–ending chondroplasty on his right knee.

== Personal life ==
Sterner is a member of the Church of Jesus Christ of Latter-day Saints.
