= Grant Holman =

American baseball player (born 2000)

Philadelphia Phillies – No. 51
- Pitcher
- Born: May 31, 2000 (age 26); Kirkland, Washington, U.S.
- Bats: Right Throws: Right

MLB debut
- August 17, 2024, for the Oakland Athletics

MLB statistics (through 2026 season)
- Win–loss record: 5–3
- Earned run average: 4.62
- Strikeouts: 33
- Stats at Baseball Reference

Teams
- Oakland Athletics / Athletics (2024–2025); Philadelphia Phillies (2026–present)

Grant James Holman (born May 31, 2000) is an American professional baseball pitcher for the Philadelphia Phillies of Major League Baseball (MLB). He has previously played in MLB for the Oakland Athletics / Athletics.

== Amateur career ==
When he was 13, Holman played in the 2013 Little League World Series, where he threw a no-hitter. He attended Eastlake High School in Chula Vista, California and played college baseball at the University of California, Berkeley. In 2019, he played collegiate summer baseball with the Cotuit Kettleers of the Cape Cod Baseball League.

== Professional career ==
=== Oakland Athletics / Athletics ===
Holman was drafted by the Oakland Athletics in the sixth round, with the 188th overall selection, of the 2021 Major League Baseball draft. After signing, he made his professional debut with the Single-A Stockton Ports. Holman split 2022 between the rookie-level Arizona Complex League Athletics and High-A Lansing Lugnuts, with an aggregate 1–5 record, 4.75 ERA, and 40 strikeouts across 41 2/3 innings pitched.

Holman split the 2023 season between the ACL Athletics, Lansing, and the Double-A Midland RockHounds. In 35 total appearances for the three affiliates, he registered a 4.26 ERA with 60 strikeouts and three saves over 44 1/3 innings of work.

Holman began the 2024 season with Double-A Midland, making 17 scoreless appearances with 24 strikeouts and 6 saves. In June, he was promoted to the Triple-A Las Vegas Aviators, where he had an 0.92 ERA with 30 strikeouts over 23 appearances. On August 16, Holman was selected to the 40-man roster and promoted to the major leagues for the first time. In 18 appearances for Oakland, Holman logged a 1-1 record and 4.02 ERA with 16 strikeouts across 15 2/3 innings pitched.

Holman was optioned to Triple-A Las Vegas to begin the 2025 season. The Athletics recalled him on April 23, 2025. In 22 appearances (two starts) for the team, he posted a 4-2 record and 5.09 ERA with 17 strikeouts over 23 innings of work. Holman was optioned back to Las Vegas on June 16, after J. T. Ginn was activated from the injured list. However, on June 19, Holman's option was rescinded and he was placed on the injured list with rotator cuff tendinitis. On July 15, he was transferred to the 60-day injured list.

Holman was designated for assignment by the Athletics on February 10, 2026.

=== Detroit Tigers ===
On February 15, 2026, Holman was claimed off waivers by the Arizona Diamondbacks. He was optioned to the Triple-A Reno Aces to begin the regular season. However, on March 25, Holman was designated for assignment by the Diamondbacks. Holman was claimed off waivers by the Los Angeles Dodgers on April 1. On April 11, he was claimed off waivers again, this time by the Detroit Tigers. In three appearances (one start) for the Triple-A Toledo Mud Hens, Holman struggled to a 6.75 ERA with three strikeouts over four innings pitched. On May 3, Holman was designated for assignment by the Tigers.

=== Philadelphia Phillies ===
On May 7, 2026, Holman was claimed off of waivers by the Philadelphia Phillies, and was optioned to Triple-A Lehigh Valley. Holman was called up to the major leagues on September 1, 2026.
