= Michael Kelly (baseball) =

American baseball player (born 1992)

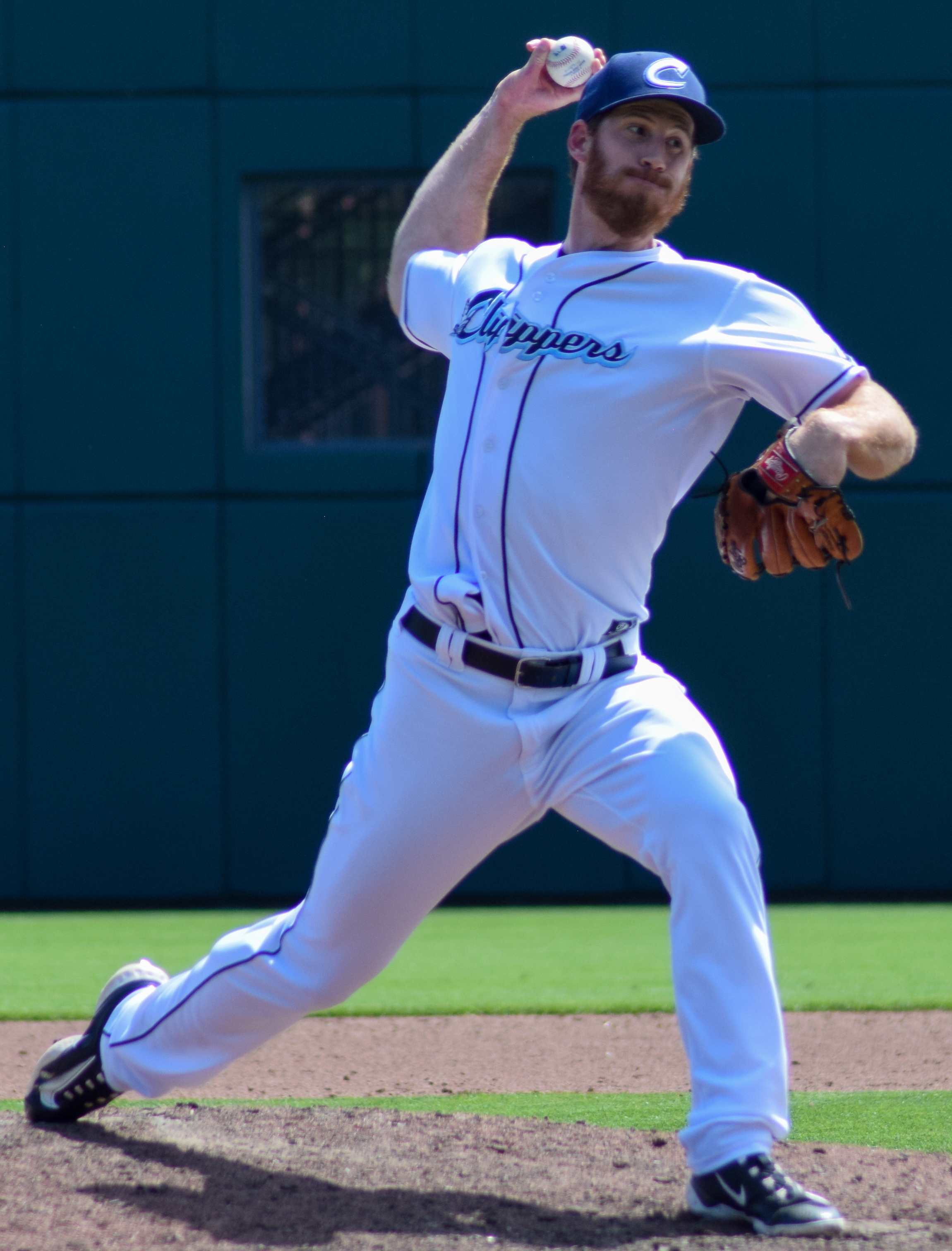
- Kelly with the Columbus Clippers in 2023

Free agent
- Pitcher
- Born: September 6, 1992 (age 34); Boynton Beach, Florida, U.S.
- Bats: Right Throws: Right

MLB debut
- June 16, 2022, for the Philadelphia Phillies

MLB statistics (through May 31, 2026)
- Win–loss record: 8–6
- Earned run average: 3.72
- Strikeouts: 77
- Stats at Baseball Reference

Teams
- Philadelphia Phillies (2022); Cleveland Guardians (2023); Oakland Athletics / Athletics (2024–2026)

Michael Joseph Kelly (born September 6, 1992) is an American professional baseball pitcher who is a free agent. He has previously played in Major League Baseball (MLB) for the Philadelphia Phillies, Cleveland Guardians, and Oakland Athletics / Athletics.

== Career ==
=== San Diego Padres ===
Kelly attended West Boca Raton Community High School in Boca Raton, Florida, and played for the school's baseball team as a pitcher. The San Diego Padres selected Kelly in the first round, with the 48th overall selection, of the 2011 MLB draft. He made his professional debut in 2012, splitting the year between the rookie-level Arizona League Padres and Single-A Fort Wayne TinCaps. Kelly split the 2013 campaign between Fort Wayne and the Low-A Eugene Emeralds, accumulating a 3-2 record and 5.75 ERA with 49 strikeouts across 56 1/3 innings pitched.

Kelly returned to Eugene in 2014, posting a 7-5 record and 4.05 ERA with 71 strikeouts across 15 appearances (14 starts). He split 2015 between the High-A Lake Elsinore Storm and Eugene, logging a cumulative 5-9 record and 5.68 ERA with 57 strikeouts over 19 appearances (18 starts). In 2016, Kelly played for Lake Elsinore, the Double-A San Antonio Missions, and the Triple-A El Paso Chihuahuas. In 25 starts for the three affiliates, he compiled a 9-8 record and 4.34 ERA with 115 strikeouts across 128 2/3 innings pitched.

Kelly split the 2017 season between Double–A San Antonio and Triple–A El Paso. In 28 games (22 starts), he accumulated a 10–4 record and 4.19 ERA with 128 strikeouts in 126 2/3 innings pitched. Kelly elected free agency following the season on November 6, 2017. He pitched for the Padres' organization for six seasons without appearing in the major leagues.

=== Baltimore Orioles ===
On December 14, 2017, Kelly signed a major league contract with the Baltimore Orioles. He was designated for assignment on March 29, 2018, and assigned outright to the Double-A Bowie Baysox after clearing waivers on April 5. Kelly split the year between Bowie and the Triple–A Norfolk Tides, accumulating a 1–6 record and 8.42 ERA with 62 strikeouts across 31 appearances. He elected free agency following the season on November 2.

=== Southern Maryland Blue Crabs ===
On April 25, 2019, Kelly signed with the Southern Maryland Blue Crabs of the Atlantic League of Professional Baseball, an independent baseball league. He made 20 appearances (17 starts) for the Blue Crabs, compiling a 3–8 record and 5.34 ERA with 83 strikeouts across 89 1/3 innings pitched.

=== Houston Astros ===
On May 11, 2021, Kelly signed a minor league contract with the Houston Astros organization. He split the season between the Double–A Corpus Christi Hooks and Triple–A Sugar Land Skeeters. In 41 relief outings between the two affiliates, Kelly accumulated a 5–4 record and 2.70 ERA with 62 strikeouts across 50 innings of work. He elected free agency following the season on November 7.

=== Philadelphia Phillies ===
On November 28, 2021, Kelly signed a minor league contract with the Philadelphia Phillies. He began the season with the Triple-A Lehigh Valley IronPigs. On June 13, 2022, Kelly was selected to the 40-man roster and promoted to the major leagues for the first time. He made four appearances for the Phillies, recording a 2.25 ERA with four strikeouts across four innings pitched. On July 14, Kelly was removed from the roster and sent outright to Triple–A Lehigh. He elected free agency on October 14.

=== Cleveland Guardians ===
On January 4, 2023, Kelly signed a minor league contract with the Cleveland Guardians. The deal included an invitation to the Guardians' major league spring training camp. He began the year with the Triple-A Columbus Clippers, where he made 18 appearances and recorded a 1.61 ERA with 36 strikeouts and two saves in 22 1/3 innings pitched. On June 3, Kelly was selected to the major league roster to fill the roster spot vacated by Hunter Gaddis, who had been optioned to Triple-A. In 14 games for Cleveland, he compiled a 3.78 ERA with 16 strikeouts across 16 2/3 innings of work. The Guardians designated Kelly for assignment on November 14.

=== Oakland Athletics ===
On November 17, 2023, the Oakland Athletics claimed Kelly off of waivers. In 28 games for Oakland, he recorded a 2.59 ERA with 22 strikeouts across 31 1/3 innings pitched. On June 4, 2024, MLB suspended Kelly for one year for violating the league's gambling policies.

On June 5, 2025, Kelly was activated from the restricted list. He made 42 appearances during the remainder of the year for the Athletics, compiling a 4–4 record and 3.18 ERA with 29 strikeouts and two saves across 39 2/3 innings pitched.

Kelly made five appearances for the Athletics in 2026, recording a 16.20 ERA with six strikeouts over five innings pitched. On June 29, 2026, Kelly was designated for assignment following the promotion of Joshua Kuroda-Grauer. He was released by the team on July 5.
