= Mitch Spence =

American baseball player (born 1998)

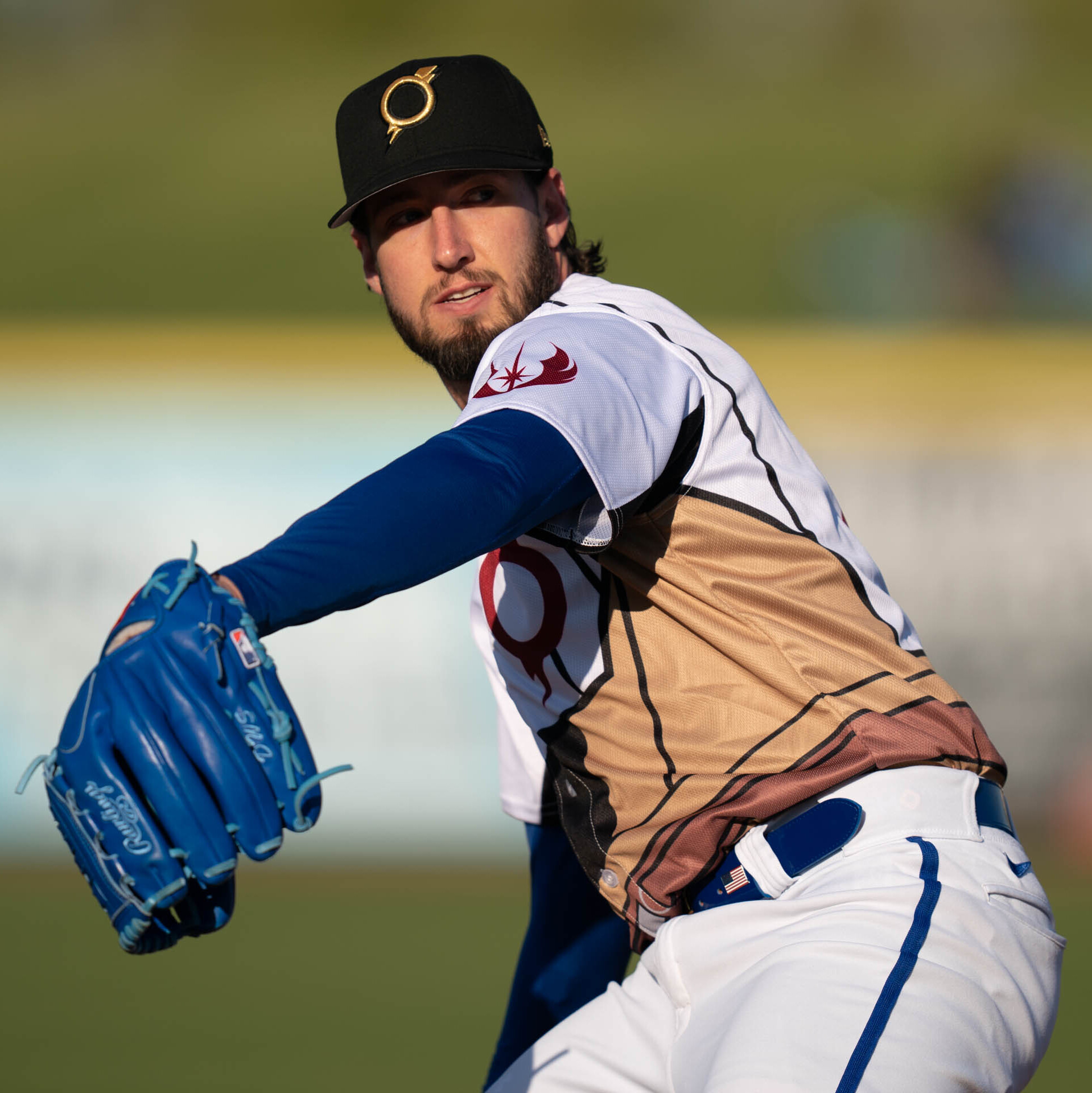
- Spence with the Omaha Storm Chasers in 2026

Kansas City Royals – No. 54
- Pitcher
- Born: May 6, 1998 (age 28); Kirkland, Washington, U.S.
- Bats: Right Throws: Right

MLB debut
- March 29, 2024, for the Oakland Athletics

MLB statistics (through 2026 season)
- Win–loss record: 11–18
- Earned run average: 5.39
- Strikeouts: 198
- Stats at Baseball Reference

Teams
- Oakland Athletics / Athletics (2024–2025); Kansas City Royals (2026–present)

Mitchell Perry Spence (born May 6, 1998) is an American professional baseball pitcher for the Kansas City Royals of Major League Baseball (MLB). He has previously played in MLB for the Oakland Athletics.

== Career ==
=== Amateur career ===
Spence attended Green Hope High School in Cary, North Carolina, and played on the school's baseball team. He enrolled at the University of South Carolina Aiken, where he played college baseball for the Pacers. Spence was twice named the Peach Belt Conference's pitcher of the week.

=== New York Yankees ===
The New York Yankees drafted Spence in the 10th round, with the 315th overall selection, of the 2019 Major League Baseball draft. He made his professional debut with the rookie–level Pulaski Yankees, posting a 3.54 ERA in 16 games out of the bullpen. Spence did not play in a game in 2020 due to the cancellation of the minor league season because of the COVID-19 pandemic.

Spence returned to action in 2021 with the High–A Hudson Valley Renegades. He made 23 appearances (20 starts) and logged a 7–6 record and 3.94 ERA with 118 strikeouts in 105 innings pitched. He split the 2022 season between the Double–A Somerset Patriots and Triple–A Scranton/Wilkes-Barre RailRiders. Pitching in 27 contests, Spence registered a 6–7 record and 4.70 ERA with 127 strikeouts across 130 1/3 innings of work.

The Yankees invited Spence to spring training as a non-roster player in 2023. He spent the year with Triple–A Scranton, making 29 starts and posting an 8–8 record and 4.47 ERA with 153 strikeouts across 163 innings pitched.

=== Oakland Athletics ===
On December 6, 2023, the Oakland Athletics selected Spence with the first overall pick of the Rule 5 draft. After competing in spring training in 2024 for a roster spot with the Athletics, Spence made their Opening Day roster. After pitching in relief, Spence made his first major league start on May 17. The Athletics kept him in their starting rotation afterwards. In 35 appearances (24 starts) for Oakland during his rookie campaign, Spence compiled an 8–10 record and 4.58 ERA with 126 strikeouts across 151 1/3 innings pitched.

Spence made 32 appearances (eight starts) for the Athletics in 2025, registering a 3–6 record and 5.10 ERA with 66 strikeouts and one save across 84 2/3 innings pitched. On February 10, 2026, Spence was designated for assignment by the Athletics.

=== Kansas City Royals ===
On February 12, 2026, the Athletics traded Spence to the Kansas City Royals in exchange for A.J. Causey. He was optioned to the Triple-A Omaha Storm Chasers to begin the regular season. He made his debut on March 18th, giving up 6 runs in four innings of relief of Noah Cameron vs. the New York Yankees, and has subsequently been moved back and forth between the Storm Chasers and Royals.

== See also ==
- Rule 5 draft results
