= Turlock Transit =

Transportation in California, United States

- Turlock Transit bus at Turlock Transit Center in August 2026
- Parent: City of Turlock
- Founded: November 16, 1998; 28 years ago
- Headquarters: 156 S Broadway 230
- Locale: Turlock, CA
- Service type: Bus service, Dial-a-Ride
- Routes: 6
- Destinations: Turlock
- Hubs: Roger K. Fall Transit Center, Central Park (Turlock)
- Annual ridership: 194,723 (2020)
- Operator: Storer Transit Systems
- Website: Official website

Turlock Transit is the primary bus agency serving residents and visitors to Turlock, the second-largest city in Stanislaus County, California (after the county seat, Modesto). It is operated by the city through its contractor Storer Transit Systems and offers both fixed routes and dial-a-ride local service within Turlock, with most fixed routes operating out of a central transit center. (Regional bus service connecting Turlock to other cities is operated by Stanislaus Regional Transit Authority).

== History ==
Fixed route public transportation in Turlock was initiated on November 16, 1998; the city's new service was named the Bus Line Service of Turlock, aka BLaST. The initial BLaST service operated two loop routes, adding a third in May 1999. In addition, Turlock operated a dial-a-ride service under the name Dial-A-Ride-Turlock (DART). Laidlaw Transit was the initial contracted operator. The BLaST Transfer Hub was moved from the city's Walmart (on Countryside Drive) to Central Park near downtown Turlock on December 22, 2003.

By 2004, BLaST was operating four fixed routes, which all met at Central Park every 40 minutes. Routes were designated by letter (A, B, C, D) and operated as one-way loops; the transfer hub was moved to Dels Lane on August 13, 2007. With the move, headways were decreased to 30 minutes, but these were later adjusted to 35, then 40 minutes by 2011, coincident with fare increases and service hour cutbacks. The Turlock Regional Transit Center opened at its present location, the intersection of Golden State Boulevard and Dels Lane, on August 27, 2012. Both StaRT and The Bus (Merced) have scheduled service to the Transit Center, where riders may transfer to and from BLaST.

In accordance with the recommendations of the 2016 Short Range Transit Plan (SRTP), buses were fitted with electronic fare boxes and the service was expanded to six routes in June 2016. On January 2, 2017, the service was rebranded to Turlock Transit; the change included increased service hours and revised routes, in response to a state-mandated increase in the farebox recovery ratio target. In February 2017, a fire disabled four city-owned buses while they were parked at the city's corporation yard. Three were damaged beyond repair and were replaced in 2018.

== Services ==
=== Fixed routes ===
All fixed routes start and end at the Roger K. Fall Transit Center in Turlock. Routes 1 and 2 operate the same path in opposite directions.

Turlock Transit fixed routes
No.	Route name	Terminus	via	Terminus	Typical headway (minutes)	Notes / Refs.
1	Countryside	Roger K. Fall Transit Center	Countryside, Monte Vista, Geer, & Fulkerth/Hawkeye (Target, CSUS, Save Mart)	Roger K. Fall Transit Center	30 (M-Sa)	
2	Geer	Roger K. Fall Transit Center	Fulkerth/Hawkeye, Geer, Monte Vista, & Countryside (Walmart, CSUS, Safeway)	Roger K. Fall Transit Center	30 (M-Sa)	
3	Olive	Roger K. Fall Transit Center	Golden State, Christofferson, Olive, & Hawkeye (Pitman HS, CSUS, Emanuel Medical Center)	Roger K. Fall Transit Center	30 (M-Sa)	
4	Colorado	Roger K. Fall Transit Center	Hawkeye, Canal, Berkeley, & Colorado (Turlock HS, Crane Park)	Roger K. Fall Transit Center	30 (M-Sa)	
5	Lander	Roger K. Fall Transit Center	Golden State, Lander, & Linwood (Downtown/Central Park, Save Mart)	Roger K. Fall Transit Center	30 (M-Sa)	
6	Soderquist	Roger K. Fall Transit Center	Fulkerth, Tully, Main, & Soderquist	Roger K. Fall Transit Center	30 (M-Sa)	
7	Fransil	Roger K. Fall Transit Center	Fulkerth, Tully, Walnut, Main, & Fransil	Roger K. Fall Transit Center	30 (M-Sa)	

== Fleet and facilities ==
Turlock Transit fleet (fixed routes)
Fleet no. (Qty)	Year	Mfr	Model	Length	Fuel	Notes
21858–21861 (4)	2018	Gillig	Low Floor	35'	CNG	
21962–21965 (4)	2019	Gillig	Low Floor	35'	CNG	
22168–22169 (2)	2020	Gillig	Low Floor	35'	CNG	
(6)	2017	Champion Bus	LF Transport	26'	?	

=== Facilities ===
Selected Turlock Transit facilities
- Points of interest
- Parks and open spaces
1 Walmart
(original BLaST Transfer Hub, 1998–2003)
2 Central Park (interim transit center, 2003–07)
3 Roger K. Fall Transit Center
(formerly Turlock Regional Transit Center, 2012–18)
4 Corporation Yard (bus depot)

The Roger K. Fall Transit Center is at 1418 N Golden State Blvd near downtown Turlock, equipped with bus bays, rider waiting areas, and administrative offices. It was rededicated on September 21, 2018 for the longtime city transportation engineering supervisor; before it was renamed in 2018, it was the Turlock Regional Transit Center. Prior to the completion of the Fall Transit Center, the transfer hub for BLaST routes was approximately 1 mi (1.6 km) southeast in Central Park, at the corner of Golden State and Main.

In 2019, Turlock Transit began planning the construction of the Transit Operations Facility, which will be located north of the existing city Corporation Yard. In accordance with planned future operations, the TOF will be equipped with solar power and battery-electric bus charging infrastructure.
