= Söderström =

Söderström is a surname of Swedish origin, and Søderstrøm a surname of Norwegian origin. Both mean "south stream; or, river"; and both are commonly anglicized as Soderstrom or Soederstroem. People with those surnames include:

- Bruno Söderström (1881–1969), Swedish track and field athlete
- Christian Söderström (born 1980), Swedish ice hockey player
- Dan Söderström (born 1948), Swedish ice hockey player
- Elisabeth Söderström (1927–2009), Swedish soprano noted for her performances of both opera and song
- Fredrik Söderström (born 1973), Swedish footballer
- Gustaf Söderström (1865–1958), Swedish athlete who won a gold medal at the 1900 Olympic Games
- Hans Söderström (born 1957), Swedish curler
- Jonatan Söderström (AKA "Cactus", active from 2008), Swedish independent video game developer
- Judy Soderstrom (born 1942), American politician and businesswoman
- Marit Söderström (born 1962), Swedish sailor who competed in the 1988 Summer Olympics
- Mark Soderstrom (born 1970), Australian footballer and television presenter
- Oliver Söderström (born 1998), Swedish racing driver
- Ove Söderström, (born 1939), Swedish curler
- Per Søderstrøm (born 1943), Norwegian handball player who competed in the 1972 Summer Olympics
- Peter Söderström (born 1975) Swedish politician
- Reuben G. Soderstrom (1888–1970), American labor union leader in Illinois
- Steve Soderstrom (born 1972), American baseball player
- Thomas Robert Soderstrom (1936–87), American agrostologist
- Tim Söderström (born 1994), Swedish footballer
- Tommy Söderström (born 1969), Swedish ice hockey goaltender
- Tyler Soderstrom (born 2001), American baseball player
- Ulf Söderström (born 1972), Swedish ice hockey player
- Victor Söderström (disambiguation), multiple people
- Pär Anders Söderström (born 1980), Swedish nuclear physicist

== See also ==
- Söderström, a river in central Stockholm
- Bouteloua, a genus of plants formerly known as Soderstromia
- Söderströms Förlag, a Finnish Swedish-language publishing company
