= Blake Cederlind =

American baseball player (born 1996)

Free agent
- Pitcher
- Born: January 4, 1996 (age 30); Turlock, California, U.S.
- Bats: Right Throws: Right

MLB debut
- September 15, 2020, for the Pittsburgh Pirates

MLB statistics (through 2020 season)
- Win–loss record: 0–0
- Earned run average: 4.50
- Strikeouts: 4
- Stats at Baseball Reference

Teams
- Pittsburgh Pirates (2020)

Blake Cederlind (born January 4, 1996) is an American professional baseball pitcher who is a free agent. He has previously played in Major League Baseball (MLB) for the Pittsburgh Pirates.

== Amateur career ==
Cederlind attended Turlock High School in Turlock, California, where he played baseball and was teammates with Brett Cumberland and Kevin Kramer. In 2014, his senior year, he went 8–1 with a 1.50 ERA along with batting .289. He was not drafted out of high school in the 2014 Major League Baseball draft, and he enrolled at Merced College where he played college baseball.

As a freshman at Merced in 2015, Cederlind went 3–1 with a 7.89 ERA over 21 2/3 innings. After the year, he was selected by the Minnesota Twins in the 22nd round of the 2015 Major League Baseball draft but did not sign. In 2016, his sophomore year at Merced, he appeared in 23 games (making four starts) in which he compiled a 5–2 record and 3.75 ERA while striking out 63 batters in 57 2/3 innings. Following the season, the Pittsburgh Pirates selected Cederlind in the fifth round of the 2016 Major League Baseball draft.

== Professional career ==
=== Pittsburgh Pirates ===
Cederlind signed with Pittsburgh for $285,000, and was assigned to the Rookie-level Bristol Pirates. Over six starts, he went 0–1 with a 4.67 ERA. In 2017, Cederlind spent the season with the Single-A West Virginia Power where he pitched to a 2–3 record and 7.76 ERA over 25 games (seven starts), striking out 55 batters over 58 innings. He returned to West Virginia to begin the 2018 season and was promoted to the Class-A Advanced Bradenton Marauders in June. Over 49 2/3 innings between both teams, he pitched to a 4–4 record and 4.89 ERA while striking out 54 batters. Cederlind returned to Bradenton to begin 2019 before he was promoted to the Double-A Altoona Curve in May. In August, he was promoted to the Triple-A Indianapolis Indians with whom he finished the season. Over 41 relief appearances between the three clubs, Cederlind went 5–2 with a 2.28 ERA, striking out 55 over 59 1/3 innings.

Cederlind was added to the Pirates 40-man roster following the 2019 season. On July 5, 2020, it was announced that Cederlind had tested positive for COVID-19. On September 15, Cederlind was promoted to the major leagues for the first time and made his debut against the Cincinnati Reds.

On March 12, 2021, Cederlind was placed on the 60-day injured list due to a strained ulnar collateral ligament in his right elbow. On March 23, 2021, Cederlind underwent Tommy John surgery, causing him to miss the 2021 season. On November 10, 2022, Cederlind was sent outright off of the 40-man roster.

Cederlind returned from injury in 2023, making five appearances for Bradenton and struggling to a 13.50 ERA with six strikeouts in six innings pitched. On May 31, 2023, Cederlind was released by the Pirates organization.

=== San Diego Padres ===
On June 8, 2023, Cederlind signed a minor league contract with the San Diego Padres organization. Cederlind made five appearances split between the Rookie–level Arizona Complex League Padres and Double–A San Antonio Missions; in 4 2/3 innings, he surrendered six runs on five hits and seven walks with seven strikeouts. On July 14, Cederlind was released by the Padres.

=== Arizona Diamondbacks ===
On April 6, 2026, after two years of inactivity, Cederlind signed a minor league contract with the Arizona Diamondbacks. He appeared in 15 games split between the rookie–level Arizona Complex League Diamondbacks and Double–A Amarillo Sod Poodles, compiling an 0–1 record and 5.02 ERA with 12 strikeouts and three saves across 14 1/3 innings pitched. Cederlind was released by the Diamondbacks on August 10.
