= Jocelyn Moore =

Jocelyn Moore may refer to:

- Jocelyn Wardrop-Moore (born 1932), British alpine skier
- Jocelyn Moore (businessperson), American National Football League official
