= Colin Kaepernick =

American football player (born 1987)

- Kaepernick in 2025

No. 7
- Position: Quarterback

Personal information
- Born: November 3, 1987 (age 39); Milwaukee, Wisconsin, U.S.
- Listed height: 6 ft 4 in (1.93 m)
- Listed weight: 230 lb (104 kg)

Career information
- High school: Pitman (Turlock, California)
- College: Nevada (2006–2010)
- NFL draft: 2011: 2nd round, 36th overall pick

Career history
- San Francisco 49ers (2011–2016)

Awards and highlights
- 2× WAC Offensive Player of the Year (2008, 2010); WAC Freshman of the Year (2007); NFL records: Rushing yards by a quarterback in a game: 181; Rushing yards by a quarterback in a postseason: 264

Career NFL statistics
- Passing attempts: 1,692
- Passing completions: 1,011
- Completion percentage: 59.8%
- TD–INT: 72–30
- Passing yards: 12,271
- Passer rating: 88.9
- Rushing yards: 2,300
- Rushing touchdowns: 13
- Stats at Pro Football Reference

Colin Rand Kaepernick (/ˈkæpərnɪk/ KAP-ər-nik; born November 3, 1987) is an American civil rights activist and former professional football quarterback. He played for the San Francisco 49ers in the National Football League (NFL) for six seasons. In 2016, he gained attention for kneeling during the U.S. national anthem at the start of NFL games in protest of police brutality and racial inequality in the United States.

Kaepernick played college football for the Nevada Wolf Pack, winning Western Athletic Conference Offensive Player of the Year twice. Selected by the 49ers in the second round of the 2011 NFL draft, Kaepernick began his professional career as a backup to Alex Smith. He became the 49ers' starter in the middle of the 2012 season after Smith was injured and led the team to Super Bowl XLVII, the team's first Super Bowl appearance since 1994. In his first full season as the starter in 2013, Kaepernick helped the 49ers reach the NFC Championship Game. Over the next three seasons, Kaepernick was demoted from and reinstated as the team's starting quarterback, with the 49ers missing the playoffs each year.

Kaepernick sat and kneeled during the playing of the U.S. national anthem prior to games throughout the 2016 pre-season and regular season as a protest against police brutality and racial inequality in the United States. The protests were highly polarized and included negative reactions from U.S. president Donald Trump. Kaepernick became a free agent after the season and was not signed by any team, prompting him to file a grievance against the NFL and team owners in November 2017, accusing them of collusion in keeping him out of the league; Kaepernick withdrew the grievance in February 2019 after reaching a confidential settlement with the NFL. His protests received renewed attention in 2020 amid the George Floyd protests, and kneeling became a part of protest movements in other sports regarding racial injustice.

== Early life ==
Colin Rand Kaepernick was born on November 3, 1987, in Milwaukee, Wisconsin, to 19-year-old Heidi Russo, who is a White American. His birth father, who is a Black American (of Ghanaian, Nigerian, and Ivorian ancestry) and whose identity is unknown, separated from Russo before Kaepernick was born. Russo placed Kaepernick up for adoption, and at five weeks old, he was placed with a white couple named Rick and Teresa Kaepernick. The couple had two biological children: son Kyle and daughter Devon. The Kaepernicks decided to adopt a boy after losing two other sons to heart defects.

Kaepernick lived in Fond du Lac, Wisconsin, until age four, when his family moved to California. When he was eight years old, Kaepernick began playing youth football as a defensive end and punter. At age nine, he was the starting quarterback on his youth team, and he completed his first pass for a long touchdown. A 4.0 GPA student at John H. Pitman High School in Turlock, California, Kaepernick played football, basketball and baseball and was nominated for all-state selection in all three sports his senior year. In his senior year, he was the most valuable player (MVP) of the Central California Conference in football. In basketball, he was a first-team All-CCC selection at forward and led his 16th-ranked team to a near upset of No. 1-ranked Oak Ridge High School in the opening round of the playoffs. In that game, Kaepernick scored 34 points, but future NBA player Ryan Anderson of Oak Ridge scored 50 points to lead his team to a victory.

== College career ==
Kaepernick received most of his high school accolades as a baseball pitcher. He received several scholarship offers in that sport, but he wanted to play college football. The University of Nevada, Reno, was the only college to offer Kaepernick a football scholarship, and Kaepernick signed with Nevada in February 2006.

Kaepernick started his college career in 2007 with the Nevada Wolf Pack as a back-up quarterback, playing in 11 of the team's 13 games. He finished the season with 19 passing touchdowns, three interceptions and 2,175 passing yards, garnering a 53.8% completion percentage. Kaepernick also added 593 rushing yards and six rushing touchdowns as Nevada finished 6–7. He was named Western Athletic Conference Freshman of the Year.

As a sophomore, Kaepernick recorded 2,849 passing yards, 22 passing touchdowns, seven interceptions, 1,130 rushing yards and 17 rushing touchdowns. He became just the sixth player in NCAA history to pass for 2,000 yards and rush for 1,000 or more yards in a single season. At the Humanitarian Bowl, he had 370 passing yards, three passing touchdowns, two interceptions, 15 rushing yards and one rushing touchdown, earning the game's MVP award despite his team losing the game. At the conclusion of the game, Kaepernick was designated the WAC Offensive Player of the Year. He was the first sophomore to win this award since Marshall Faulk of San Diego State did in 1992.

In the 2009 Major League Baseball draft, Kaepernick was selected in the 43rd round by the Chicago Cubs. He decided that he wanted to continue to play football at the University of Nevada and did not sign with the Cubs.

Kaepernick finished his junior season with 2,052 passing yards, 20 passing touchdowns, six interceptions 1,183 rushing yards and 16 rushing touchdowns. Kaepernick led the Wolf Pack to an 8–5 record and a second-place finish in the WAC behind undefeated Boise State. He was named second-team All-WAC quarterback for the season.

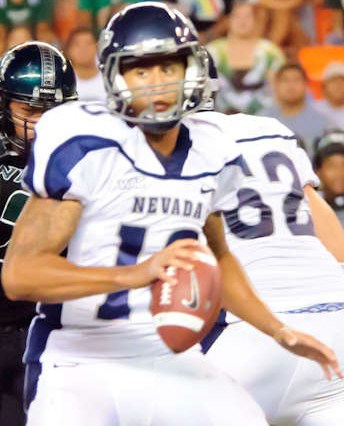
Kaepernick in 2010

On November 26, 2010, Kaepernick led his team to a 34–31 overtime victory against the previously undefeated Boise State Broncos, snapping their 24-game win streak that had dated back to the 2008 Poinsettia Bowl. This game was played on Nevada's senior night, the final home game for Kaepernick. Nevada head coach Chris Ault would later call this game the "most important win in program history".

Kaepernick ended his senior season with 3,022 passing yards, 21 passing touchdowns, eight interceptions, 1,206 rushing yards and 20 rushing touchdowns. He joined Florida's Tim Tebow as the second quarterback in FBS history to have 20 passing touchdowns and 20 rushing touchdowns in the same season. Nevada claimed a share of the WAC title after defeating Louisiana Tech. Kaepernick was named WAC Co-Offensive Player of the Year with Kellen Moore, who had won the award in 2009.

Kaepernick finished his collegiate career with 10,098 passing yards, 82 passing touchdowns, 24 interceptions, 4,112 rushing yards and 59 rushing touchdowns. He became the first quarterback in the history of Division I FBS college football to have passed for over 10,000 yards and rushed for over 4,000 yards in a collegiate career, a feat that has not been duplicated. He also tied former Nebraska quarterback and Heisman Trophy winner Eric Crouch for most career rushing touchdowns by a quarterback in FBS history (later broken by Keenan Reynolds).

Kaepernick maintained a 4.0 grade point average during his college years and graduated in 2011 with a bachelor's degree in business management. After his senior season, Kaepernick was eligible for the 2011 NFL Draft.

== Professional career ==
Pre-draft measurables
Height	Weight	Arm length	Hand span	Wingspan	40-yard dash	10-yard split	20-yard split	20-yard shuttle	Three-cone drill	Vertical jump	Broad jump
6 ft 4 5/8 in (1.95 m)	233 lb (106 kg)	33 1/2 in (0.85 m)	9 1/8 in (0.23 m)	6 ft 7 3/8 in (2.02 m)	4.63 s	1.63 s	2.71 s	4.18 s	6.85 s	32.5 in (0.83 m)	9 ft 7 in (2.92 m)
All values from NFL Combine

=== 2011 season ===
On April 29, 2011, the San Francisco 49ers traded up with the Denver Broncos from the thirteenth pick in the second round (45th overall) to select Kaepernick as the fourth pick in the second round (36th overall) at the 2011 NFL draft. The Broncos received picks 45, 108, and 141 overall in exchange for the 36th overall pick.

Kaepernick spent the 2011 season as backup to Alex Smith and attempted just five passes in three games during the season.

=== 2012 season ===
In 2012, Kaepernick was initially used sparingly to run certain plays. He scored his first career touchdown in the team's fourth game when he scored on a seven-yard run against the New York Jets. In Week 10, against the St. Louis Rams, Kaepernick replaced Smith in the second half of the game after he suffered a concussion in the first half. Kaepernick completed eleven of seventeen passes for 117 yards and added 66 rushing yards and a rushing touchdown as the 49ers and the Rams ended the game in a 24–24 tie. He got his first NFL start the next game on November 19, during a Monday Night Football game against the Chicago Bears at Candlestick Park. Kaepernick completed 16-of-23 for 246 yards with two touchdowns in a 32–7 win against a highly ranked Bears defense. A quarterback controversy began. Smith was ranked third in the NFL in passer rating (104.1), led the league in completion percentage (70%), and had been 19–5–1 as a starter under Jim Harbaugh, while Kaepernick was considered more dynamic with his scrambling ability and arm strength. Smith was cleared to play the day before the following game, but Harbaugh chose not to rush him back and again started Kaepernick. Kaepernick won NFC Offensive Player of the Week for Week 15 against the New England Patriots. He passed for 221 yards, four touchdowns, and one interception in the 41–34 victory. He remained the starter for the rest of the season and led the 49ers to an 11–4–1 record and a berth in the NFL playoffs.

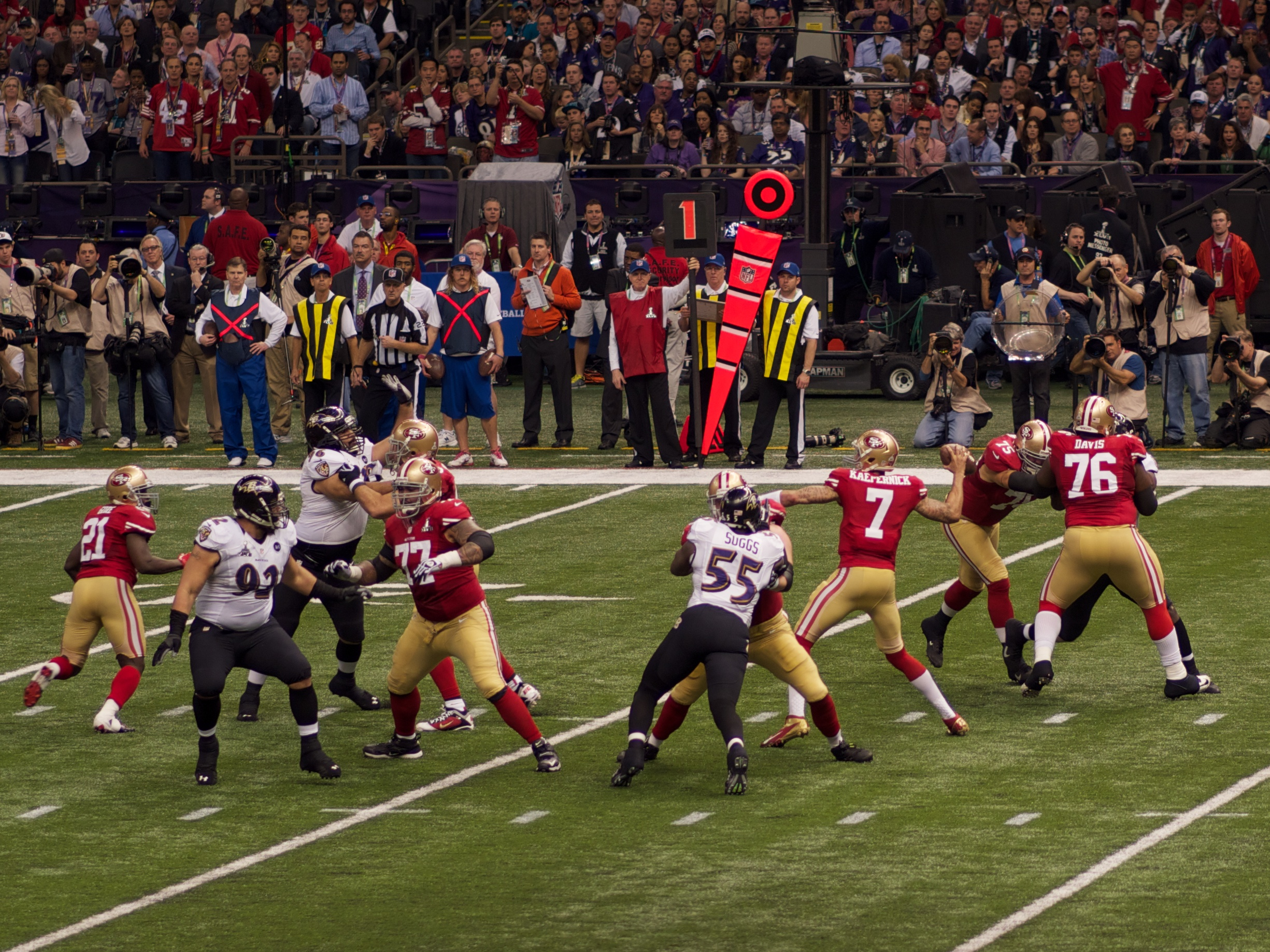
Kaepernick in Super Bowl XLVII

In his first career postseason start, against the Green Bay Packers, Kaepernick had 263 passing yards, two passing touchdowns, one interception and 181 rushing yards and two rushing touchdowns as the 49ers defeated the Packers 45–31. With his performance, he set an NFL single-game record for most rushing yards by a quarterback with 181, breaking Michael Vick's record of 173 in a 2002 regular season game. He also broke the 49ers postseason rushing record, regardless of position and joined Jay Cutler and Otto Graham in both as the only players in NFL history to run for two touchdowns and pass for two others in a playoff game. In the NFC Championship, the 49ers defeated the Atlanta Falcons 28–24 with Kaepernick completing 16-of-21 passes for 233 yards and one touchdown. The team advanced to Super Bowl XLVII in New Orleans against the Baltimore Ravens. Kaepernick threw for 302 yards, one passing touchdown, and ran for a touchdown, but the 49ers fell behind early and could not come back, losing by a score of 34–31. He was ranked 81st by his fellow players on the NFL Top 100 Players of 2013.

=== 2013 season ===
In the season opener of the 2013 season against the Green Bay Packers, Kaepernick threw for a career-high 412 yards and three touchdowns, the first 400-yard game by a 49ers quarterback since Tim Rattay on October 10, 2004. Kaepernick ended the season with 3,197 yards passing, 21 touchdowns, and eight interceptions, 524 yards rushing yards and four rushing touchdowns and led the 49ers to a 12–4 record and a berth in the NFL playoffs.

In the Wild Card Round, the 49ers played the Green Bay Packers. Kaepernick had 227 passing yards, one passing touchdown, one interception and added 98 rushing yards as the 49ers beat the Packers 23–20. In the Divisional Round, against the Carolina Panthers, Kaepernick had 196 passing yards, one passing touchdown, 15 rushing yards, and one rushing touchdown as the 49ers beat the Panthers 23–10. In the NFC Championship Game, against eventual Super Bowl champion Seattle Seahawks, Kaepernick had 153 passing yards, one passing touchdown, two interceptions and rushed for 130 yards as the 49ers lost to the Seahawks 23–17, ending the 49ers' season and attempt to return to the Super Bowl. He was ranked 81st by his fellow players on the NFL Top 100 Players of 2014.

=== 2014 season ===
On June 4, Kaepernick signed a six-year contract extension with the 49ers, worth up to $126 million, including $54 million in potential guarantees, and $13 million fully guaranteed.

On September 17, Kaepernick was fined by the NFL for using inappropriate language on the field. On October 9, he was fined $10,000 by the NFL for appearing at a post-game press conference wearing headphones from Beats by Dre, while the league's headphone sponsor was Bose. In a game against the San Diego Chargers, he ran for a 90-yard touchdown. The 49ers finished the season 8–8 and failed to make the playoffs for the first time since 2010. Kaepernick threw for 3,369 yards with 19 touchdowns and 10 interceptions. He rushed for 639 yards and one touchdown. Following the season, head coach Jim Harbaugh left to coach the University of Michigan.

=== 2015 season ===
In 2015, Kaepernick struggled under new head coach Jim Tomsula. A day after a 27–6 collapse at St. Louis in Week 8, Kaepernick lost his starting job to backup Blaine Gabbert for Week 9 against Atlanta. With Gabbert starting as their new quarterback, the 49ers narrowly won 17–16. On November 21, the 49ers announced that Kaepernick would miss the rest of the season because of an injured left shoulder that required surgery. He ended the season with 1,615 yards passing, six passing touchdowns, five interceptions and 256 rushing yards with one rushing touchdown in nine games.

Head coach Tomsula was fired following the season and the 49ers hired Chip Kelly as his replacement. In February 2016, Kaepernick expressed an interest in being traded.

=== 2016 season ===
Kaepernick was coming off three surgeries entering the 2016 season, needing operations on his thumb and knee in addition to the season-ending shoulder procedure. After having lost weight and muscle mass because of the injuries, he competed for the starting quarterback position with Gabbert. Kelly named Gabbert as the starter to open the season.

Prior to the 49ers Week 6 game against the Buffalo Bills, Kelly announced Kaepernick would start, marking his first start of the season. On October 13, it was announced that he and the 49ers restructured his contract, turning it into a two-year deal with a player option for the next season. He completed 13-of-29 passes, with 187 passing yards, one passing touchdown and 66 rushing yards in the 49ers 45–16 loss to the Buffalo Bills. On November 27, he recorded 296 passing yards, three passing touchdowns and 113 yards rushing in the 49ers' 31–24 loss to the Miami Dolphins. He joined Michael Vick, Cam Newton, Randall Cunningham, and Marcus Mariota as the only quarterbacks in NFL history to record at least three passing touchdowns and 100 yards rushing in a game. In a Week 13 loss to the Chicago Bears, Kaepernick threw a career-low four yards before getting benched for Gabbert. He returned to the starting lineup the following week and threw for 183 yards and two touchdowns in the 49ers' 41–13 loss to the Atlanta Falcons. On December 24, Kaepernick recorded 281 total yards, two passing touchdowns, one interception, one rushing touchdown, and a two-point conversion on the game-winning drive as the 49ers beat the Los Angeles Rams 22–21 to get their first victory on the season with Kaepernick as the starter. For the 2016 NFL season, Kaepernick played twelve games and ended the season with 2,241 passing yards, sixteen passing touchdowns, four interceptions and added 468 rushing yards and two rushing touchdowns.

During the offseason, San Francisco hired Kyle Shanahan from Atlanta to be their new coach. He planned to run the same offense which he ran the previous year with the Falcons, and did not believe that Kaepernick fit the scheme. The 49ers told Kaepernick that they planned to release him. On March 3, 2017, he opted out of his contract and became a free agent at the start of the 2017 league year on March 9.

=== Lawsuit against the NFL and potential NFL future ===
Following his departure from the 49ers in 2016, Kaepernick went unsigned through the off-season and 2017 training camps, leading to allegations that he was being blackballed because of his on-field political statements as opposed to his performance. The Seattle Seahawks brought Kaepernick in for a visit in May 2017, but did not work him out or offer a contract. Seahawks head coach Pete Carroll said, "He's a starter in this league. And we have a starter. But he's a starter in this league, and I can't imagine that someone won't give him a chance to play." The Baltimore Ravens considered signing Kaepernick as a backup to starting quarterback Joe Flacco before the 2017 season. According to former Raven Ray Lewis, the team did not go through with this after Kaepernick's girlfriend made comparisons of Ravens owner Steve Bisciotti to a slave owner, and Lewis his slave, in a tweet; Bisciotti reportedly believed the signing would result in heavy backlash and criticism from the general public, a claim that was refuted by the team. By August 2017, the statistics website FiveThirtyEight concluded that "it's obvious Kaepernick is being frozen out for his political opinions", calling it "extraordinary... that a player like him can't find a team", based on the observation that "no above-average quarterback has been unemployed nearly as long as Kaepernick this offseason". The Seahawks set up another visit and workout with him in April 2018, but the team postponed it indefinitely after he would not say whether he would continue his national anthem protest or not.

In October 2017, Kaepernick filed a grievance against the NFL, accusing league owners of collusion to keep him out of the league. The NFL requested to dismiss the case but was denied by an arbitrator which meant the case would go to trial. On February 15, 2019, it was announced that Kaepernick reached a confidential settlement with the NFL and withdrew the grievance. In a related case, Eric Reid, who was the first to join Kaepernick in kneeling when they were 49ers teammates, also settled with the league. Reid had been unsigned for a stretch before joining the Carolina Panthers.

Before November 2019, Kaepernick had not had an NFL tryout since becoming a free agent. He continued working out five days a week, and stated publicly and privately that he wished to continue playing.

On November 12, 2019, the NFL set up a workout for him in Atlanta on Saturday, November 16. All 32 NFL teams were invited to attend the private session, which was to be closed to the media. It was to include an on-field workout and an interview, with videos of both to be sent to teams afterward. Aside from its scouting combine, the league rarely organizes workouts for all of its teams. Typically, NFL teams schedule workouts for Tuesdays, when head coaches and general managers can more readily attend. On Saturdays, teams are preparing for games the next day and traveling to away games. On November 16, about 30 minutes before the scheduled start of the workout, Kaepernick nixed the plans over concerns about the workout not being public and issues with the liability waiver the NFL asked him to sign. He instead moved to an Atlanta-area high school, where he held a public throwing session attended by scouts from seven NFL teams.

In an opinion piece published by The New York Times on November 22, 2019, Ta-Nehisi Coates said Kaepernick is "not fighting for a job" but that he is "fighting against cancellation".

In February 2019, it was reported that Kaepernick spoke with the Alliance of American Football and XFL about becoming a quarterback for them but wanted a guaranteed $20,000,000 per season. XFL quarterbacks were paid $250,000 per season while AAF quarterbacks were signed to an unguaranteed $250,000 over three seasons.

In June 2020, Seahawks head coach Pete Carroll said that he regretted not signing Kaepernick in 2017; however, for the 2020 season, he would not be signing him and was happy with Geno Smith as the team's backup quarterback. Carroll indicated "someone is interested" in Kaepernick and that a team contacted him about Kaepernick to get some insight on him and Carroll said that it is the first time any team has contacted him since his 2017 meeting with Kaepernick.

Kaepernick worked out for the Las Vegas Raiders in May 2022.

In August 2024, Harbaugh, in his first year as the Los Angeles Chargers' head coach, revealed he had reached out to Kaepernick months prior to offer him a coaching job on the team, but he declined. As the Chargers staff was already complete for 2024, he would have had to join at the start of the 2025 season had he changed his mind.

== Career statistics ==
=== NFL ===
Legend
**Bold**	Career high

==== Regular season ====
Year	Team	Games			Passing									Rushing					Sacks		Fumbles	
Year	Team	GP	GS	Record	Cmp	Att	Pct	Yds	Y/A	Lng	TD	Int	Rtg	Att	Yds	Avg	Lng	TD	Sck	Yds	Fum	Lost
2011	SF	3	0	—	3	5	60.0	35	7.0	19	0	0	81.3	2	−2	−1.0	−1	0	0	0	0	0
2012	SF	13	7	5–2	136	218	**62.4**	1,814	**8.3**	57	10	3	**98.3**	63	415	6.6	50	**5**	16	112	**9**	2
2013	SF	16	16	12–4	243	416	58.4	3,197	7.7	64	**21**	8	91.6	92	524	5.7	28	4	39	231	6	4
2014	SF	16	16	8–8	**289**	**478**	60.5	**3,369**	7.0	**80**	19	**10**	86.4	**104**	**639**	6.1	**90**	1	**52**	**344**	8	**5**
2015	SF	9	8	2–6	144	244	59.0	1,615	6.6	76	6	5	78.5	45	256	5.7	15	1	28	166	5	1
2016	SF	12	11	1–10	196	331	59.2	2,241	6.8	65	16	4	90.7	69	468	**6.8**	30	2	36	207	**9**	3
Career		69	58	28–30	1,011	1,692	59.8	12,271	7.3	80	72	30	88.9	375	2,300	6.1	90	13	171	1,060	37	15

==== Playoffs ====
Year	Team	Games			Passing									Rushing					Sacks		Fumbles	
Year	Team	GP	GS	Record	Cmp	Att	Pct	Yds	Y/A	Lng	TD	Int	Rtg	Att	Yds	Avg	Lng	TD	Sck	Yds	Fum	Lost
2011	SF	0	0	did not play																		
2012	SF	3	3	2−1	**49**	80	**61.3**	**798**	**10.0**	45	**4**	2	**100.9**	25	**264**	**10.6**	56	**3**	5	**32**	1	0
2013	SF	3	3	2−1	45	**82**	54.9	576	7.0	45	3	**3**	74.0	**26**	243	9.3	**58**	1	**6**	26	**3**	**1**
Career		6	6	4–2	94	162	58.0	1,374	8.5	45	7	5	87.3	51	507	9.9	58	4	11	58	4	1

=== College ===
Year	Team	Games			Passing								Rushing			
Year	Team	GP	GS	Record	Cmp	Att	Pct	Yds	Avg	TD	Int	Rate	Att	Yds	Avg	TD
2006	Nevada	0	0	—	Redshirted (redshirt)											
2007	Nevada	11	8	4–4	133	247	53.8	2,175	8.8	19	3	150.8	105	593	5.6	6
2008	Nevada	13	12	6–6	208	383	54.3	2,849	7.4	22	7	132.1	161	1,130	7.0	17
2009	Nevada	13	13	8–5	166	282	58.9	2,052	7.3	20	6	139.1	161	1,183	7.3	16
2010	Nevada	14	14	13–1	233	359	64.9	3,022	8.4	21	8	150.5	173	1,206	7.0	20
Career		51	47	31–16	740	1,271	58.2	10,098	7.9	82	24	142.5	600	4,112	6.9	59

== Activism ==
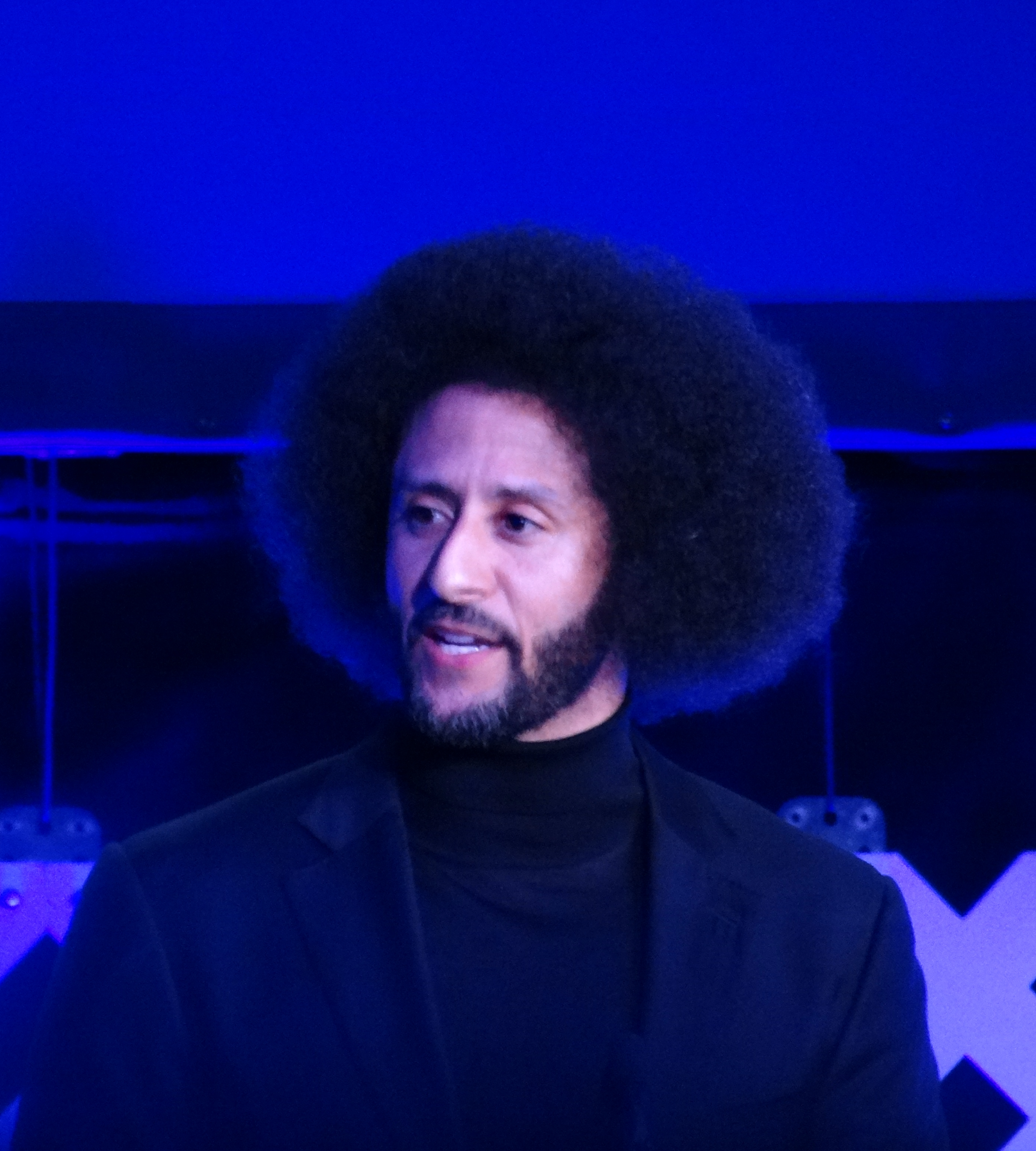
Kaepernick speaking at the 2026 ACLU Biennial Leadership Conference

Leading up to the 2016 season, Kaepernick was active in July on social media with social commentary on the fatal police shootings of Alton Sterling and Philando Castile, the police shooting of Charles Kinsey and the acquittal of police in the death of Freddie Gray. In the 49ers third preseason game of the season, reporter Steve Wyche noticed Kaepernick sitting down during the playing of "The Star-Spangled Banner", as opposed to the tradition of standing. During a post-game interview, Kaepernick explained his position stating, "I am not going to stand up to show pride in a flag for a country that oppresses black people and people of color. To me, this is bigger than football and it would be selfish on my part to look the other way. There are bodies in the street and people getting paid leave and getting away with murder", referencing a series of African-American deaths caused by law enforcement that led to the Black Lives Matter movement and adding that he would continue to protest until he feels like "[the American flag] represents what it's supposed to represent". It had gone largely unnoticed that Kaepernick was also sitting during the anthem in the previous two weeks, when he was inactive and not in uniform while recovering from injuries.

In the 49ers' fourth and final preseason game, Kaepernick kneeled during the U.S. national anthem to show more respect to former and current U.S. military members while still protesting during the anthem after having a conversation with former NFL player and U.S. military veteran Nate Boyer. Kaepernick grew more involved in social justice issues. After the September 2016 police shootings of Terence Crutcher and Keith Lamont Scott, he commented publicly on the shootings saying, "this is a perfect example of what this is about". Photos then surfaced of him wearing socks depicting police officers as pigs. In a statement, Kaepernick acknowledged wearing them as a statement against "rogue cops". He maintained that he has friends/family in law enforcement and that there are cops with "good intentions" who protect and serve and he was not targeting all police. Kaepernick went on to kneel during the anthem prior to every 49ers game that season.

After initial backlash against his protests, Kaepernick pledged to donate $1 million to "organizations working in oppressed communities". He donated $25,000 to the Mothers Against Police Brutality organization that was started by Collette Flanagan, whose son fell victim to police brutality. In 2018, Kaepernick announced that he would make the final $100,000 donation of his "Million Dollar Pledge" in the form of $10,000 donations to charities that would be matched by celebrities.

Inspired by Kaepernick, other NFL players and pro athletes conducted various forms of silent protests during the national anthem. His San Francisco teammates awarded him the team's Len Eshmont Award, as the player who best epitomized the inspirational and courageous play of former 49er Len Eshmont. Then-49ers head coach Chip Kelly later said that Kaepernick was "zero distraction" that season.

Also in 2016, Kaepernick and his partner Nessa founded the "Know Your Rights Camp", an organization which held free seminars to disadvantaged youths to teach them about self-empowerment, American history, and legal rights. In April 2020, the Know Your Rights Camp launched a relief fund for individuals impacted by the COVID-19 pandemic. Kaepernick donated $100,000 to the fund.

In 2018, Nike released an ad featuring Kaepernick with the text, "Believe in something. Even if it means sacrificing everything." NFL spokesperson Jocelyn Moore responded to the ad saying Kaepernick's social justice campaign, "deserve(s) our attention and action".

In July 2019, Nike released a shoe featuring the Betsy Ross flag called the Air Max 1 Quick Strike Fourth of July trainers. The trainers were designed to celebrate Independence Day. The model was subsequently withdrawn after Colin Kaepernick told the brand he and others found the flag offensive because they associated it with slavery. Joe Scarborough decried Nike's decision as "politically correct madness", saying that the flag should be seen as a symbol of resistance against King George III. Scarborough also felt that this instance of political correctness could help Donald Trump to be re-elected. Charles Taylor of Forbes described Nike's decision as a blunder, noting that no significant number of Americans view the Betsy Ross flag as a racist symbol and that a poll shows that 85% of American millennials like seeing the U.S. flag on Independence Day. Nike's decision to withdraw the product drew criticism from Arizona Republican governor Doug Ducey, who subsequently pulled a US$2 million tax incentive for a Nike factory in the state, and Texas Republican senator Ted Cruz.

In June 2020, amid the George Floyd protests, The New York Times wrote that the NFL had wrestled with the issue of race, noting that three-quarters of NFL players are African-American, yet nearly every NFL team owner is white (and several are prominent Trump supporters). NFL Commissioner Roger Goodell put out a statement in which he apologized for not listening to the concerns of African-American players. The Times wrote that Goodell's "words were panned as hypocritical because of the league owners' rejection of Kaepernick." Michael Rosenberg of Sports Illustrated wrote, "Mainstream white America is going to reconsider Kaepernick at some point – the way it reconsidered Muhammad Ali years after he refused to go to Vietnam, the way it reconsidered Jackie Robinson and Jack Johnson. Progress comes in fits and starts, and this country tends to punish those who urge it to move faster. The reconsideration of Kaepernick has begun." In August, after the shooting of Jacob Blake, a black man, Goodell said that he wished the NFL had listened earlier to Kaepernick's reasons for kneeling.

Kaepernick supports the abolition of police and prisons. In October 2020, Kaepernick Publishing launched a project with Medium titled "Abolition for the People", a collection of 30 essays written by several activists calling for police and prison abolition and criticizing prison reform as only "reforming, reshaping, and rebranding" systemic racism. In August 2016 Kaepernick wore a t-shirt featuring a picture of a meeting between Malcolm X and Fidel Castro and praised the Cuban Literacy Campaign. He also said, "I am a believer in Malcolm X and his ideology and what he talked about and what he believed in as far as fighting oppression".

=== Vegan activism ===
In 2016, Kaepernick said that he began following a vegan diet nine months earlier to help recover from injuries. In 2020, he partnered with Impossible Foods via his organization "Know Your Rights Camp" to provide vegan food to "communities in need." Also in 2020, he partnered with Ben & Jerry's to create a vegan flavor called "Change the Whirled." A portion of the proceeds will also go to the "Know Your Rights Camp."

== Written works ==
- Kaepernick, Colin, ed. (2021). Abolition for the People: The Movement for a Future Without Police & Prisons. Chicago: Haymarket. ISBN 9781642599633.
- Kaepernick, Colin (2022). I Color Myself Different. Illustrated by Eric Wilkerson. New York: Scholastic. ISBN 9781338789621.
- Kaepernick, Colin; Ewing, Eve L.; Caicedo, Orlando (2023). Change the Game. New York: Scholastic. ISBN 9781338789652.
- Kaepernick, Colin; Diab, Nessa (2024). We Are Free, You & Me. Illustrated by Gladys Jose. New York: Scholastic. ISBN 9781339042947.
- Kaepernick, Colin (2026). The Perilous Fight. New York: Legacy Lit. ISBN 9781538777879.

== Personal life ==
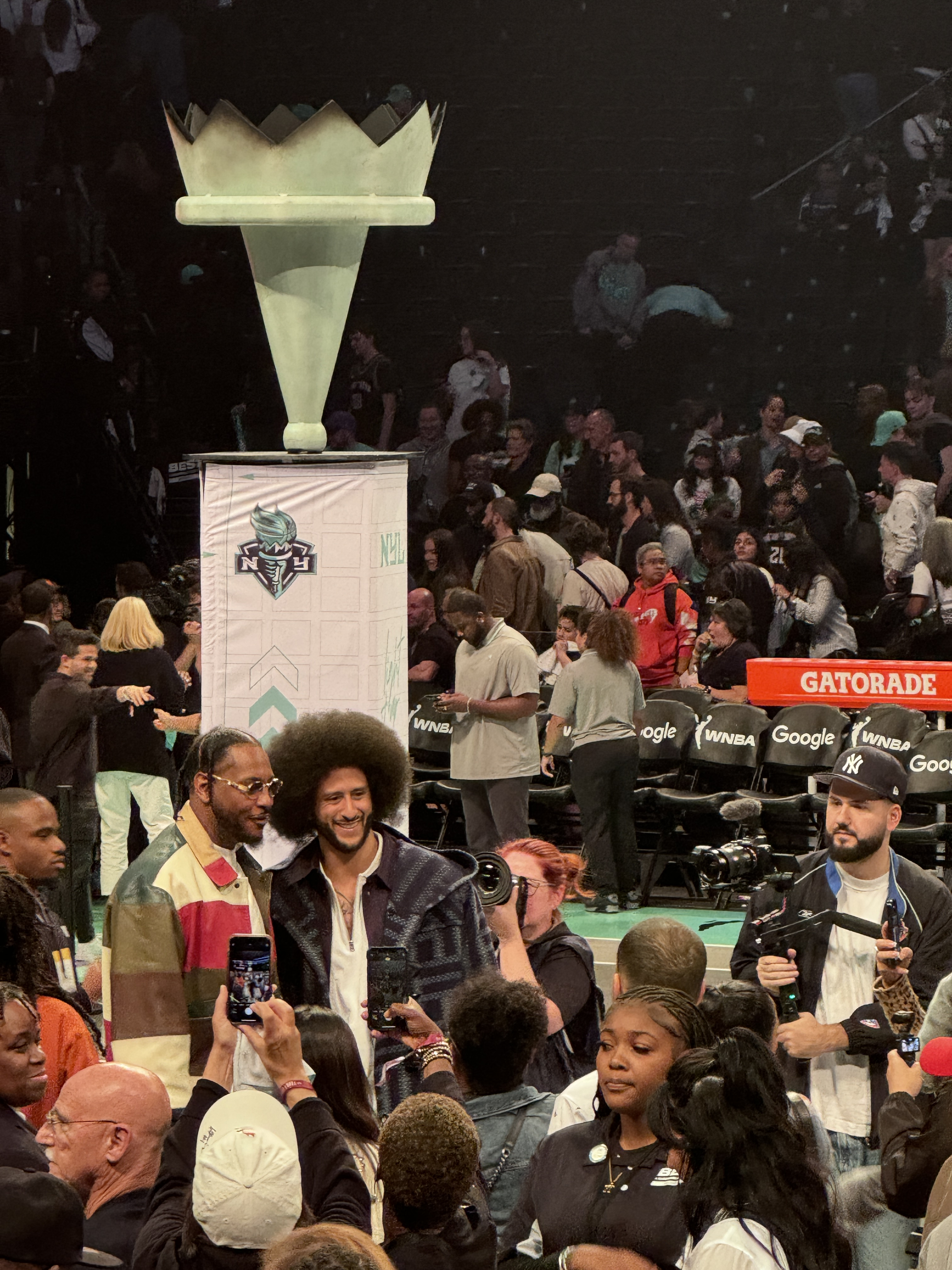
Colin Kaepernick poses with Carmelo Anthony after a New York Liberty/Las Vegas Aces WNBA Semifinals game, October 1, 2024

Kaepernick was baptized Methodist, confirmed Lutheran, and attended a Baptist church during his college years. Kaepernick spoke about his faith saying, "I think God guides me through every day and helps me take the right steps and has helped me to get to where I'm at." Kaepernick has tattoos about his faith. His right arm features a scroll with the Bible verse Psalm 18:39 written on it. Tattooed under the scroll are praying hands with the phrase "To God The Glory" written on them. To the left of both the scroll and praying hands is the word "Faith" written vertically. His left arm features a Christian cross with the words "Heaven Sent" on it referring to Jesus Christ. Written above and below the cross is the phrase "God Will Guide Me". Written to the left and right of the cross is the Bible verse Psalm 27:3.

Kaepernick reportedly started dating radio personality and television host Nessa Diab in July 2015 and officially went public about their relationship in February 2016. Their daughter was born in August 2022.

Kaepernick's family has had a pet African spurred tortoise named Sammy since he was 10 years old.

In February 2020, Kaepernick started Kaepernick Publishing. Kaepernick published a children's book titled I Color Myself Different in April 2022 through his publishing company and Scholastic.

On October 29, 2021, Netflix premiered Colin in Black & White, a six-episode limited series about Kaepernick's teenage years. The series was co-created by Kaepernick and Ava DuVernay.

Kaepernick's memoir, The Perilous Fight, was released on September 15, 2026.

== Awards and honors ==
- 2017 GQ Magazine Citizen of the Year
- 2017 Sports Illustrated Muhammad Ali Legacy Award
- 2017 ACLU Eason Monroe Courageous Advocate Award
- 2017 Puffin/Nation Prize for Creative Citizenship honoree
- 2018 Amnesty International Ambassador of Conscience Award
- 2018 Harvard University W. E. B. Du Bois Medal
- 2020 Ripple of Hope Award from the Robert F. Kennedy Center for Justice and Human Rights
- 2026 ACLU Ralph Ellison Award for Defenders of Civil Rights and Civil Liberties in the Arts, Business, Science, and Sports
