= Kade Morris =

American baseball player (born 2002)

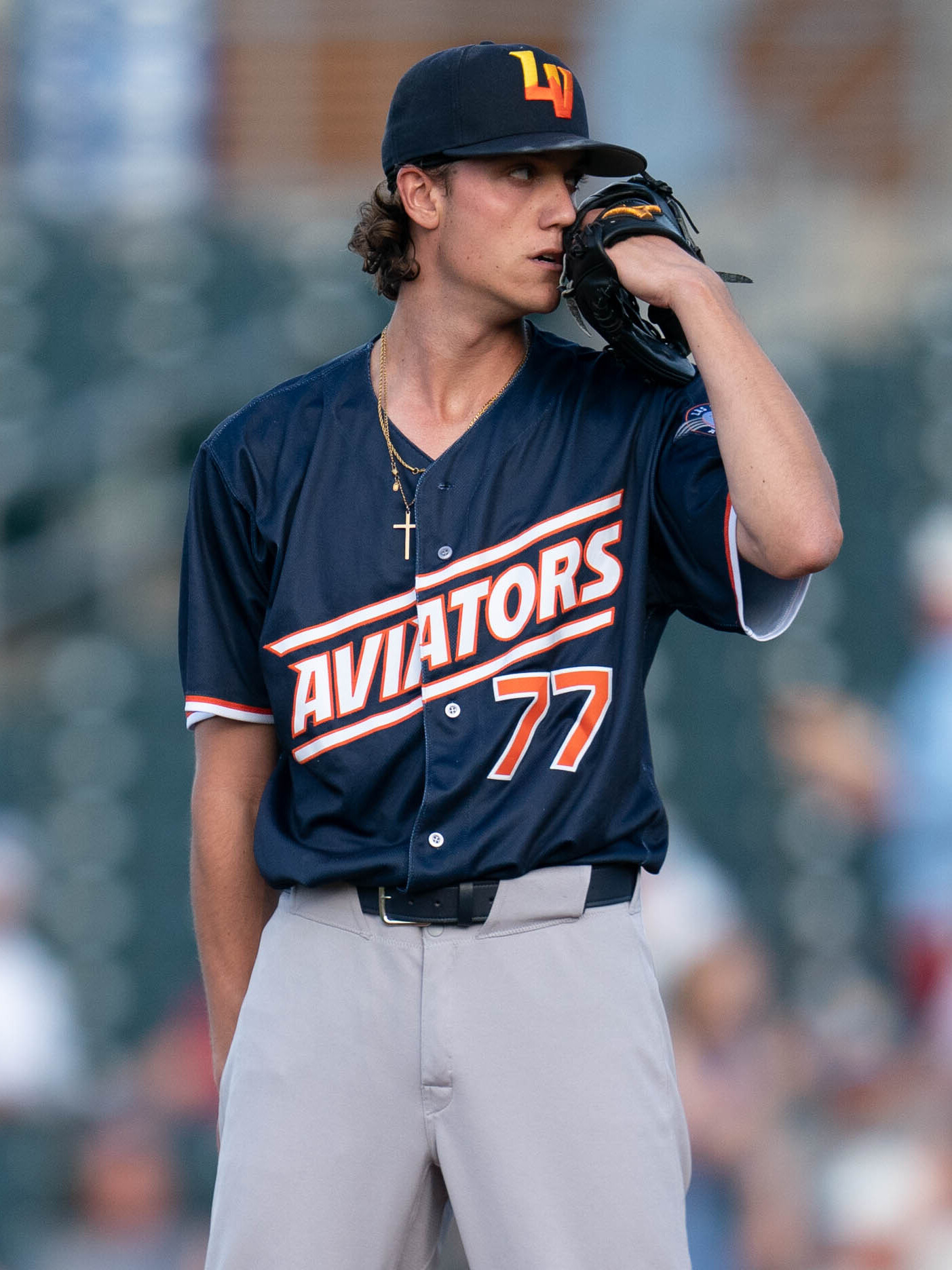
- Morris with the Las Vegas Aviators in 2026

Athletics – No. 67
- Pitcher
- Born: June 21, 2002 (age 24); Modesto, California, U.S.
- Bats: Right Throws: Right

MLB debut
- June 6, 2026, for the Athletics

MLB statistics (through 2026 season)
- Win–loss record: 0–1
- Earned run average: 10.90
- Strikeouts: 10
- Stats at Baseball Reference

Teams
- Athletics (2026–present)

Kade Tanner Morris (born June 21, 2002) is an American professional baseball pitcher for the Athletics of Major League Baseball (MLB). He debuted in MLB in 2026.

== Career ==
Morris attended John H. Pitman High School in Turlock, California, and played college baseball at University of Nevada, Reno. In 2022, he played collegiate summer baseball with the Cotuit Kettleers of the Cape Cod Baseball League.

=== New York Mets ===
The New York Mets selected Morris in the third round of the 2023 Major League Baseball draft. He signed with the Mets and spent his first professional season with the Florida Complex League Mets and St. Lucie Mets.

Morris began the 2024 campaign with Single–A St. Lucie, recording a 3.63 ERA in seven games; following a promotion to the High–A Brooklyn Cyclones, he posted a 4–3 record and 3.43 ERA with 57 strikeouts across 11 games (10 starts).

=== Oakland Athletics / Athletics ===
On July 30, 2024, the Mets traded Morris to the Oakland Athletics in exchange for Paul Blackburn. He was assigned to the High–A Lansing Lugnuts, struggling to an 0–6 record and 5.92 ERA over seven starts; he also received two appearances for the Triple–A Las Vegas Aviators.

Morris split the 2025 campaign between Las Vegas and the Double–A Midland RockHounds, compiling a 9–10 record and 4.38 ERA with 128 strikeouts over 150 innings of work.

Morris was assigned to Triple-A Las Vegas to begin the 2026 season, posting a 5–3 record and 4.45 ERA with 49 strikeouts across his first 11 starts. On June 2, 2026, Morris was selected to the 40-man roster and promoted to the major leagues for the first time.
