= John H. Pitman High School =

Coordinates: 37.5305°N 120.8785°W

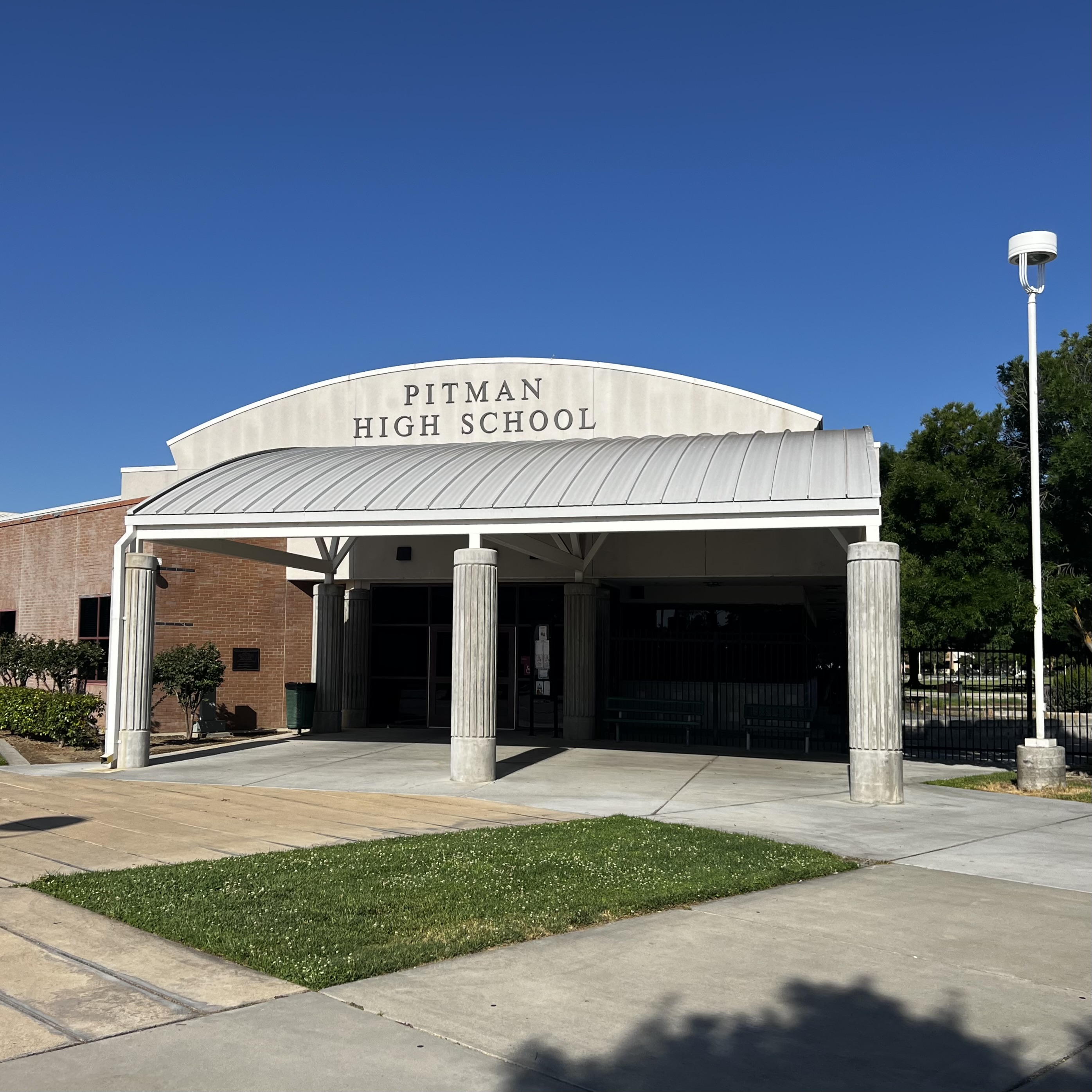
John H. Pitman High School
- 2525 W Christoffersen Parkway; Turlock, Stanislaus County, CA 95382-9509; U.S.

Information
- Type: Public
- Motto: "Never Settle, Never Quit… Roll Pride."
- Established: 2002
- Status: Open
- School district: Turlock Unified
- NCES District ID: 0600158
- Principal: Janine Arakelian
- Teaching staff: 89.85 (FTE)
- Enrollment: 1,968 (2025-2026)
  - Grade 9: 512
  - Grade 10: 477
  - Grade 11: 521
  - Grade 12: 476
- Student to teacher ratio: 22.10
- Campus: Suburban, 45 acres (180,000 m^{2})
- Colors: Dark Green and Silver
- Athletics conference: Central California Athletic League
- Mascot: Rolling Pride
- Rival: Turlock High School
- Newspaper: The Roaring Times
- Website: www.turlock.k12.ca.us/phs

John H. Pitman High School, colloquially referred to as Pitman High School (PHS), is the second comprehensive high school located in Turlock, in the heart of the northern San Joaquin Valley of California. It is situated in a transitional agrarian/suburban community and serves most of the northern part of Turlock, as well as the nearby Census-designated place of Keyes. John H. Pitman consists of a 45-acre campus.

== History ==
In the 1990s, Turlock High School was overcrowded. In 1998, the Turlock community approved a bond measure to build a new school named after John H. Pitman, who was a teacher and principal from Turlock High School. Ground was broken for the construction project in late 1997.

A dedication ceremony on Saturday, August 10, 2002, was attended by over 1,000 students.

== Statistics ==
=== Demographics ===
For the 2025–2026 school year, 1,968 students enrolled at John H Pitman High School. There are 1,031 male and 954 female students.

2025-2026 Enrollment by Race/Ethnicity
Race	Number	Percent
Hispanic	1,117	56.3%
White	549	27.7%
Asian	189	9.5%
Two or more races	66	3.3%
Black	41	2.1%
Native Hawaiian/Pacific Islander	14	0.7%
American Indian/Alaskan Native	9	0.4%

== Stadium scandal ==
The development of Pitman High School, introduced in 2002, was built without the intentions to house a stadium, alternatively sharing Turlock High School's Joe Debely Field. With further developments of the school coming to completion, notably TID's integration of lighting, Turlock Lions Club and their scoreboard, as well as 2019's addition of an all surface Track and field renovation + AstroTurf American football field further pushes the current motive to bring a home to the campus. The surrounding towns (or communities), such as Hilmar, California, Modesto, California, and Ceres, California currently have or have planned construction of their own independent fields and stadiums based in their surrounding campus. Modesto City Schools released a goal towards a project that would set a date on constructing a stadium in almost every High School by 2038, which was passed by voters in 2022 and was named Bond Measures L.

== Notable alumni ==
- Colin Kaepernick - American football player and civil rights activist (Class of 2006)
- Bradin Hagens - Major League Baseball player (Class of 2007)
- Anthony Harding - American football player (Class of 2006)
- Kade Morris - Major League Baseball player (Class of 2020)
