= Kaepernick Publishing =

Publishing company founded by Colin Kaepernick

- Formation: March 2019; 7 years ago
- Founder: Colin Kaepernick
- Type: Publishing

Kaepernick Publishing is a publishing company founded by activist and football player Colin Kaepernick in New York in March 2019 for "black and brown writers to control their narratives and retain ownership."

== Background ==
The company's "Abolition for the People" project published 30 reprinted and commissioned essays about police abolition, prison abolition, and Abolish ICE in partnership with Medium as part of an ongoing partnership to create content. The series is meant to demonstrate the failures of police reform in the United States and includes authors like Angela Davis, Ruha Benjamin, and Kiese Laymon.

In 2020, a joint venture with Audible was announced, including an audiobook of a memoir by Kaepernick.
