= Brad Lesley =

American baseball player (1958–2013)

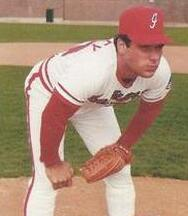
- Lesley with the Indianapolis Indians c. 1983
- Pitcher
- Born: September 11, 1958; Turlock, California, U.S.
- Died: April 28, 2013 (aged 54); Marina del Rey, California, U.S.
- Batted: Right Threw: Right

Professional debut
- MLB: July 31, 1982, for the Cincinnati Reds
- NPB: April 8, 1986, for the Hankyu Braves

Last appearance
- MLB: October 4, 1985, for the Milwaukee Brewers
- NPB: August 17, 1987, for the Hankyu Braves

MLB statistics
- Win–loss record: 1–3
- Earned run average: 3.86
- Strikeouts: 46

NPB statistics
- Win–loss record: 7–5
- Earned run average: 3.00
- Strikeouts: 58
- Stats at Baseball Reference

Teams
- Cincinnati Reds (1982–1984); Milwaukee Brewers (1985); Hankyu Braves (1986–1987)

Bradley Jay Lesley (September 11, 1958 – April 28, 2013) was an American actor, media personality and professional baseball pitcher. Lesley was an especially imposing physical figure, standing 6 ft 6 in (1.98 m) and weighing 230 lb (104 kg). Nicknamed "The Animal", he was known for his aggressive style of self-motivation.

== Early life ==
Bradley Lesley was born in Turlock, California, and he attended Turlock High School. Later, he attended Merced College in Merced, California.

== Career ==
=== Baseball ===
He played professional baseball for two Major League Baseball teams. He was drafted in the first round in 1978 by the Cincinnati Reds, for whom he pitched parts of three seasons, from 1982 to 1984. He pitched in the Reds' minor-league system for five seasons before being called up to the majors. He made his big-league debut at age 23 on July 31, 1982 in a 5-4 Reds loss at Riverfront Stadium, pitching a scoreless ninth inning against the San Diego Padres. Overall in his rookie season, he pitched 28 games (all in relief) with an 0-2 record but a fine 2.58 earned run average. The following season he appeared in only five games for the Reds, going 0-0 with a 2.16 ERA, and in 1984 he pitched in 16 Reds' games, going 0-1 with a 5.12 ERA.

On November 12, 1984 Lesley's contract was purchased by the Milwaukee Brewers. He pitched in five games for the Brewers, going 1-0 but with a 9.95 ERA. After the season, he was released, ending his Major League career.

Lesley then played two seasons in Japan for the Hankyu Braves. His record in Japan was 7–5, with 24 saves in 60 games over two years.

Lesley had a distinctive celebration of strikeouts by putting his arms in a backwards motion behind him, causing his chest to stick out, while he would roar out. In one game against the Houston Astros, Astros pitcher Nolan Ryan famously mimicked Lesley's celebration after striking out a Reds player, which got the players from both teams' dugouts, including Lesley, laughing.

=== Media personality ===
After retiring from baseball, he became a television personality in Japan, where he is probably best known for his role as "Animal Leslie" in the Japanese game show Takeshi's Castle. He participated in games such as Devil's Domain, Stuck Up, and his own game, Animal Bang. Takeshi's Castle would later be shown in the US on the cable network Spike TV as Most Extreme Elimination Challenge, later shortened to MXC.

=== Actor ===
Lesley appeared in several feature films, including Brother (2000) (as Moose), Big Monster on Campus (2000) (as Arnie), Buddy (1997) (as Ali Baba), A Boy Called Hate (1996) (as the Moving Truck Driver), Little Big League (1994) (as John 'Blackout' Gatling) and Mr. Baseball (1992) (as Niven).

== Personal life ==
Lesley was married at one time to Chiho Svimonoff and they had one son, Kentaro (健太郎). They later divorced.

== Death ==
By early 2013, Lesley had been suffering from kidney problems and had been living in a nursing home for many months, where he was receiving dialysis. On April 28, 2013, he was rushed to a hospital in Marina del Rey, where he died.

Celebrity entertainment show TMZ obtained Lesley's death certificate and reported that he died of a heart attack brought on by a case of coronary artery disease (not kidney failure, as previously reported).
