= Steve Soderstrom =

American baseball player

- Pitcher
- Born: April 3, 1972 (age 54); Turlock, California, U.S.
- Batted: Right Threw: Right

MLB debut
- September 17, 1996, for the San Francisco Giants

Last MLB appearance
- September 27, 1996, for the San Francisco Giants

MLB statistics
- Win–loss record: 2–0
- Earned run average: 5.27
- Strikeouts: 9
- Stats at Baseball Reference

Teams
- San Francisco Giants (1996)

Stephen Andrew Soderstrom (born April 3, 1972) is an American former Major League Baseball player who played for the San Francisco Giants in 1996.

== Amateur career ==
A native of Turlock, California, Soderstrom attended Turlock High School and was drafted by the New York Mets in the 15th Round (402nd overall) of the 1990 amateur draft. He didn't sign, and went on to pitch for Fresno State University. In 1991, he played collegiate summer baseball with the Hyannis Mets of the Cape Cod Baseball League. In 1993, he was drafted by the San Francisco Giants sixth overall in the 1993 amateur entry draft.

== Professional career ==
Soderstrom spent three years in the Giants' organization before getting to the major leagues. The 6'3", 215 pound right-hander made his major league debut on September 17, 1996. His stay in the majors lasted just 10 days, as his final MLB game was on September 27. Over those ten days, he started all three of the games he pitched in, compiling a 2–0 record while giving up 16 hits in 13 2/3 innings and gaining an ERA of 5.27. He walked six and struck out nine.

== Personal ==
Soderstrom currently owns and operates Backyard Sports Academy, a multi-sport instructional facility, in his hometown of Turlock.

His son, Tyler, was drafted number 26 overall in the 2020 Major League Baseball Draft by the Oakland Athletics. He is a catcher and attended the same high school as his father. They became the 10th father-son duo to be drafted in the first round. Another son, Tate, was an outfielder at the University of Arizona.
