= Emanuel Medical Center =

- Tenet Healthcare
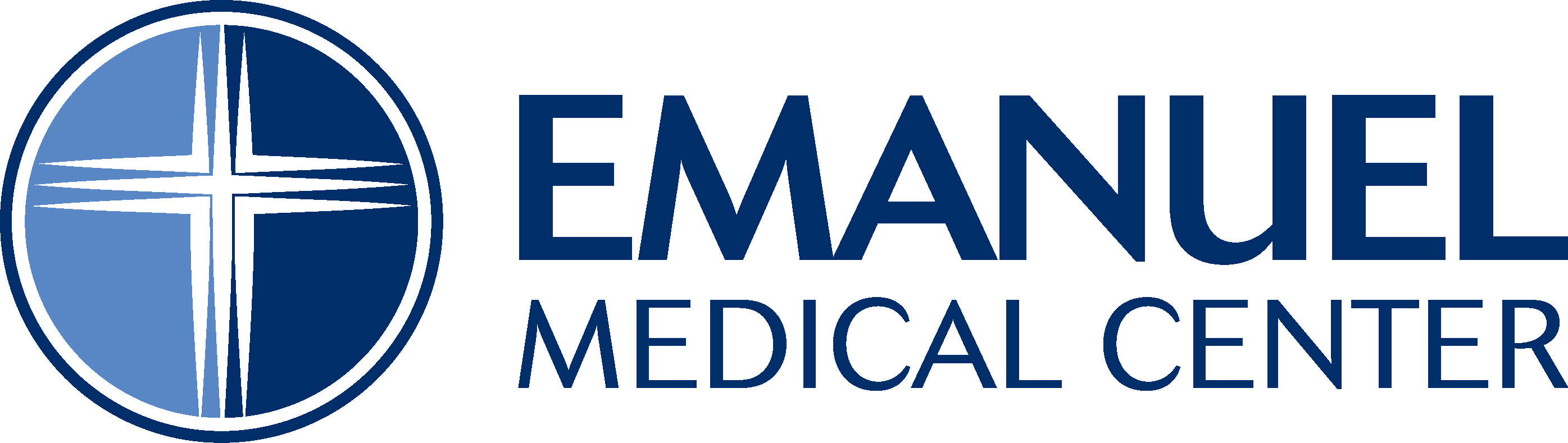

Geography
- Location: 825 Delbon Avenue, Turlock, California, United States
- Coordinates: 37°30′44″N 120°50′21″W

Services
- Beds: 209

History
- Founded: 1917

Links
- Website: EmanuelMedicalCenter.org
- Lists: Hospitals in California

Emanuel Medical Center is a 209-bed acute care hospital located in Turlock, Calif. Hospital services include 24-hour emergency care, the only heart attack receiving center between Modesto and Fresno, an advanced center for mothers and newborns, rehabilitation and therapy, and more. The Emanuel Cancer Center provides specialized cancer services that include diagnosis, treatment and support.

== Management ==
Tenet Healthcare completed the acquisition of Emanuel Medical Center on August 1, 2014.

== Key Services ==
General and specialty medical services offered at Emanuel Medical Center include:

- Cardiovascular
- Diagnostic Imaging
- Emergency Department
- Gastroenterology
- General Surgery
- Gynecology
- Laboratory Medicine
- Obstetrics
- Oncology
- Orthopedics
- Pediatrics
- Physical Therapy
