= Turlock High School =

Coordinates: 37°29′59.00″N 120°49′56.28″W

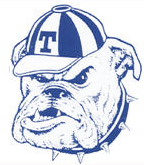

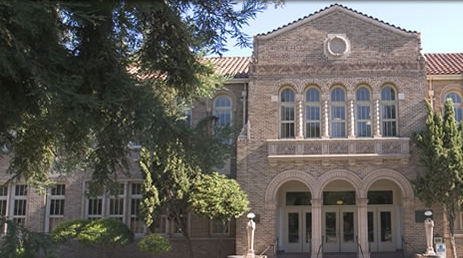
- 1600 East Canal Drive; Turlock, CA; U.S.

Information
- Type: Public
- Motto: "Strong and enduring. Rich in tradition."
- Established: 1906
- Principal: David Kline
- Teaching staff: 118.79 (FTE)
- Enrollment: 2,479 (2043-2025)
- Student to teacher ratio: 20.87
- Campus: Suburban, 45 acres (180,000 m^{2})
- Colors: Blue and gold
- Athletics conference: Central California Athletic League
- Mascot: Bulldog
- Newspaper: Clarion
- Yearbook: Alert
- Website: www.turlock.k12.ca.us/ths/

Turlock High School (THS) is a comprehensive high school located in Turlock, in the heart of the northern San Joaquin Valley in the U.S. state of California.

Turlock High School is situated on a 40+-acre campus, in the midst of a long established residential neighborhood, consisting of 133 classrooms positioned in and around an array of athletic, agricultural, business, and vocational complexes. It serves two public elementary school districts in addition to a number of private and parochial schools that exist in the surrounding area. Turlock High School is a part of the Turlock Unified School District(TUSD).

By the late 20th century, THS was the second largest high school in northern California. However, to ease the burden of overcrowding, a community bond was passed in 1998 to construct a second comprehensive campus, John H. Pitman High School, which opened in August, 2002.

== History ==
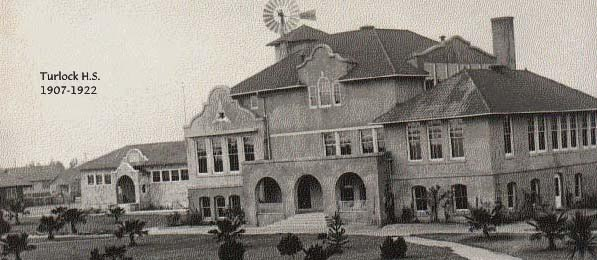
Turlock High 1907

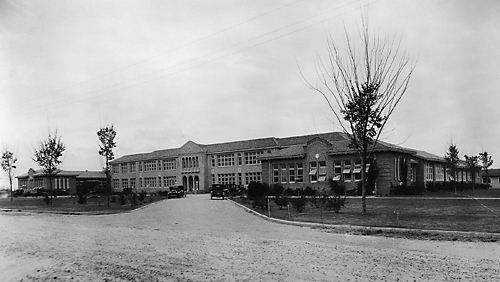
Turlock High 1922

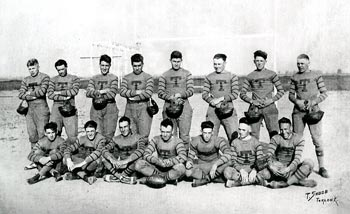
Football Team 1920

Turlock High School was organized in September 1906, with twenty-two pupils enrolled. The faculty consisted of Mr. S. R. Douglas and Miss Maud Clark. The first classes were taught in the town hall. During that year, the Student body adopted a constitution, chose blue and gold as school colors, and published the first Alert yearbook. Years later, the students at THS adopted the bulldog as their mascot and symbol. Butch and Brenda Bulldog appear at many athletic events in which their teams compete.

The first high school building opened in September 1907. It was located on the Turlock Covenant Church grounds and was torn down during the summer of 1963. In 1908, the school had its first commencement; Chesley Osborn being the sole graduate.

Bonds for a new school were voted in 1917 and after much debate, a site was selected—bounded by what is now Canal Drive, N Berkeley Avenue, E Marshall Street, and Colorado Avenue. Opening in 1922, the "main building" was designed by the renowned California architect William Henry Weeks. During the early 1920s, the "main building", containing the auditorium, classrooms, and offices was constructed. Later, the original gym (now girls' gym), bus garage, and industrial arts building was added. After World War II, the agriculture building, library, boys' gym, cafeteria, swimming pool (1962), wood shop, and the classrooms lettered "L" and "B" were built within a decade (1948–58). In the 1970s the school grounds were expanded eastward to Wallace Street/Julien Elementary School. As a result, N Berkeley Avenue now runs through the center of the campus, but is closed to traffic during school hours.

Turlock won California State Football Championship in 1949 with Paul Larson and Head Coach Joe Debely.

On November 9, 1989, the THS Football Stadium was renamed the Joe Debely Stadium and dedicated to the late Mr. Joe Debely who served as THS football, track and golf coach from 1933 to 1941 and 1946–1953.

Among its faculty has been Larry Banner, a two-time Olympian in gymnastics, who taught at Turlock High School for 16 years.

== Modernization ==
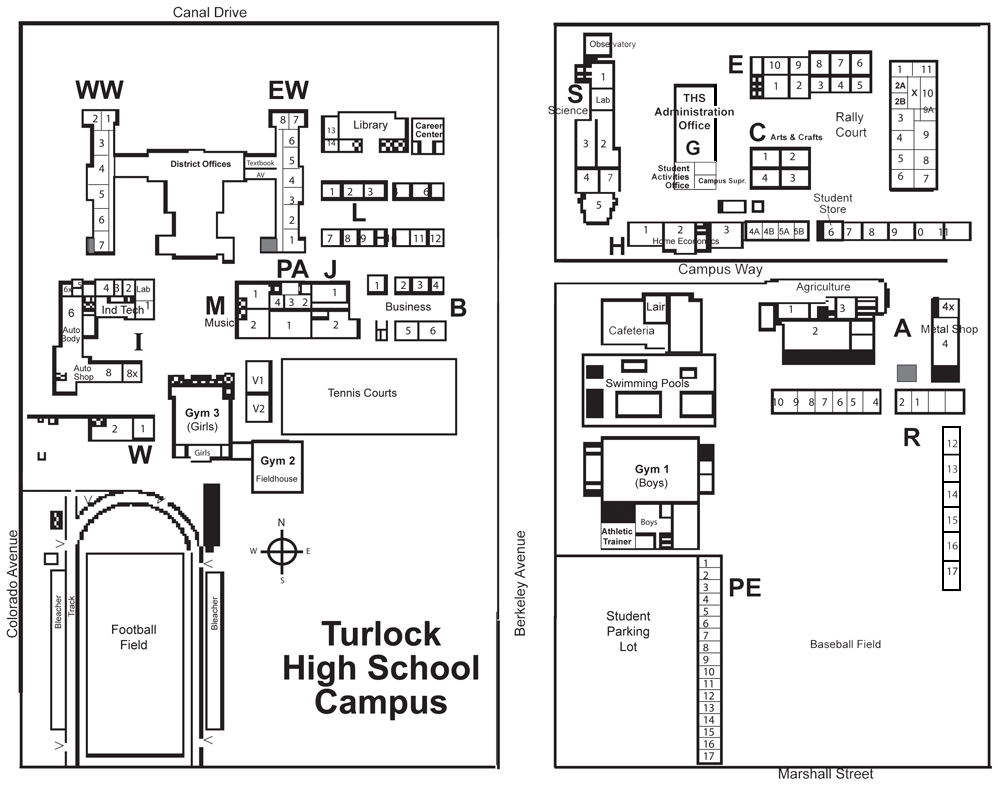
THS Campus Map

In 1972 construction was started on buildings on the east campus to replace all facilities in the old "main building". New rooms (J Building) were also constructed. These were completed and occupied in the fall of 1974. Other additions since that time were the Career Center (1977–78 school year), and the Performing Arts Building occupied in the spring of 1979.

In November 1979, the center wing of the old "main building" was gutted by fire. The roof and windows were quickly replaced to restore the exterior of the picturesque building. However, for many years the interior sat vacant. As of 2008, the interior of the main building had been completely restored. The center wing now houses the offices for the Turlock Unified School District, classrooms for the Turlock Adult School, and the Turlock Community Theatre. The east wing is still used as additional classrooms for Turlock High students and the west wing is now used by Turlock Unified School District.

In 2006, the newly renovated THS Aquatic Center was renamed in honor of the school's Aquatics Program Head Coach Steve Feaver, who has led Turlock High's water polo and swimming teams to countless championships.

== Turlock Community Theatre (Turlock High School Auditorium) ==
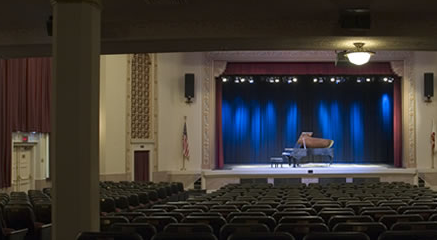
Auditorium Stage

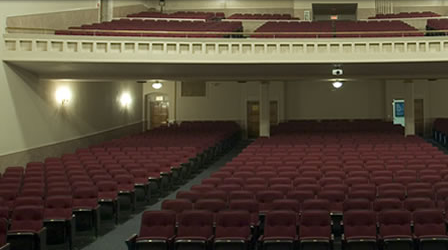
Seating

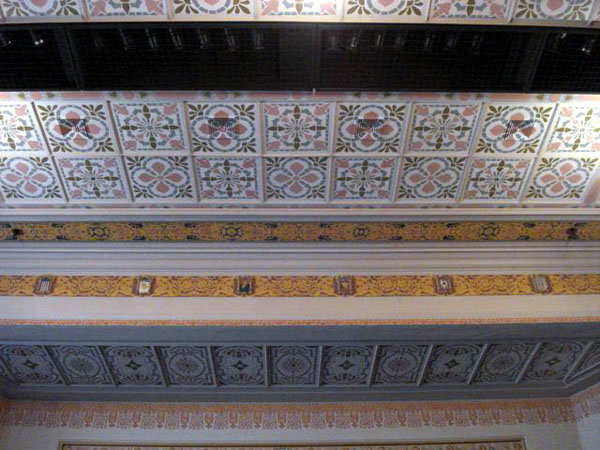
Ceiling Detail

The Turlock Community Theatre opened in 1925, and was referred to as the “Turlock High School Auditorium”. The theatre became a cultural center of the community and a center for performing arts. Among those who performed were the Von Trapp Family, the Vienna Boy's Choir, and the San Francisco Ballet. In addition, plays, concerts, and special events were staged throughout the years.

The Turlock High School main building and auditorium stood grandly near the center of downtown Turlock, bringing together all ages from the surrounding communities. This ended abruptly, however, when the building was damaged by fire in November 1979.

For seven years, the Theatre stood idle until, in 1986, a group of concerned citizens formed the “Turlock High School Auditorium Restoration Fund”, a nonprofit organization dedicated to saving this local treasure. The group signed a long-term lease with the school district, and, soon thereafter, the Theatre proudly gained formal recognition as a historical landmark in the National Register of Historic Places.

For nearly 14 years, dedicated volunteers worked tirelessly raising funds for the building's restoration. After many years of effort and a tremendous outpouring of support from the community, the multimillion-dollar restoration project was completed in the spring of 1999. The organization officially changed its name first to the “Turlock Community Auditorium” and later to the “Turlock Community Theatre” and opened the doors to a new era of cultural enrichment for the community.

Among the many nationally and internationally known entertainers to grace the Theatre's stage are Debbie Reynolds, Ann-Margret, Lou Rawls, The Smothers Brothers, Tony Orlando, Howie Mandel, Gashole Movie Premiere, Hall & Oates, Jackson Browne, Jewel, Olivia Newton-John, Paul Anka, Melissa Manchester, Julio Iglesias, Manhattan Transfer, John Fogerty, Clint Black, Mark Chesnutt, The Oak Ridge Boys, Vince Gill, Randy Travis, Lily Tomlin, Bob Newhart, Frank Caliendo, Wynonna Judd and Los Lonely Boys.

The Theatre is currently home to the Turlock Community Concert Association series of performing artists, the Turlock Junior Miss Program, the Miss Stanislaus County Scholarship Program, and regularly hosts performances by the Modesto Symphony.

== Overcrowding ==
Throughout the 1980s and 1990s, the rapid increase in student enrollment necessitated the placement of more than two dozen portable classrooms labeled the R and PE buildings, with the R section being placed between the Agriculture Building and the baseball field and the PE section placed in a row along the east side of the student parking lot. By the late 1990s, THS was the second largest high school in northern California. To ease the burden of overcrowding, a community bond was passed in 1998 to construct a second comprehensive campus, John H. Pitman High School, which opened on August 10, 2002.

== Notable alumni ==
- Kevin Kramer, MLB 2nd baseman. Drafted by the Pittsburgh Pirates in the second round of the 2015 Major League Baseball draft
- Tom Brandstater, NFL quarterback, (2003)
- Alison Cox, 2004 Olympic Games, silver medal (2004)
- Brett Cumberland, baseball player, (2014)
- Frank Duffy, Major League Baseball player, (1964)
- Susan Eggman, California State Assemblymember, (1979)
- Paul Larson, All-American quarterback for California, (1950)
- Brad Lesley, Actor, Major League baseball player, (1976)
- Tommy Mendonca, 2008 College World Series Most Outstanding Player, (2006)
- Dick Monteith, California State Senator and County Supervisor, (1950)
- Dan Reichert, Major League Baseball player, (1994)
- Steve Soderstrom, Major League Baseball player, (1990)
- Tyler Soderstrom, Major League Baseball player, (2020-present)
- Blake Cederlind, Major League Baseball player, (2020)
- Mustafa Johnson, Canadian Football League player, (2022–present)
- Cole Carrigg, Major League Baseball player, (2023–present)

== Gallery ==
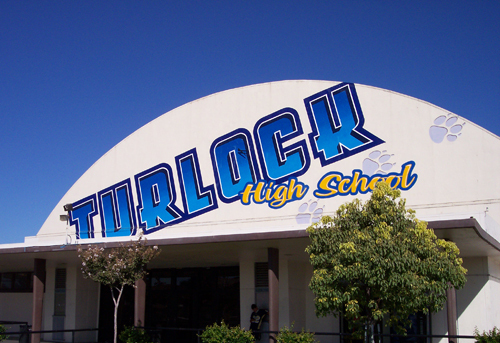
Gymnasium

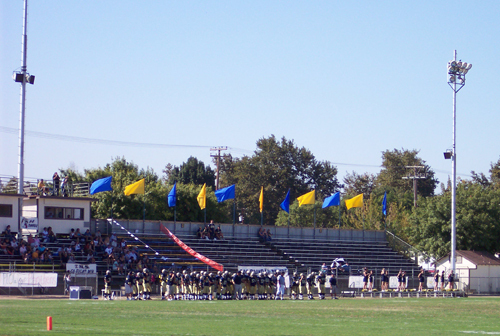
Joe Debely Stadium

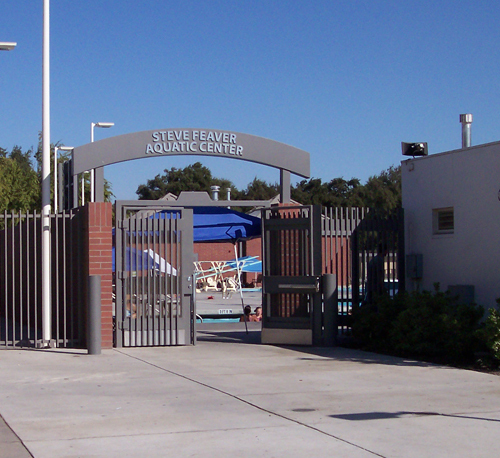
Aquatic Center
