= Tyler Soderstrom =

American baseball player (born 2001)

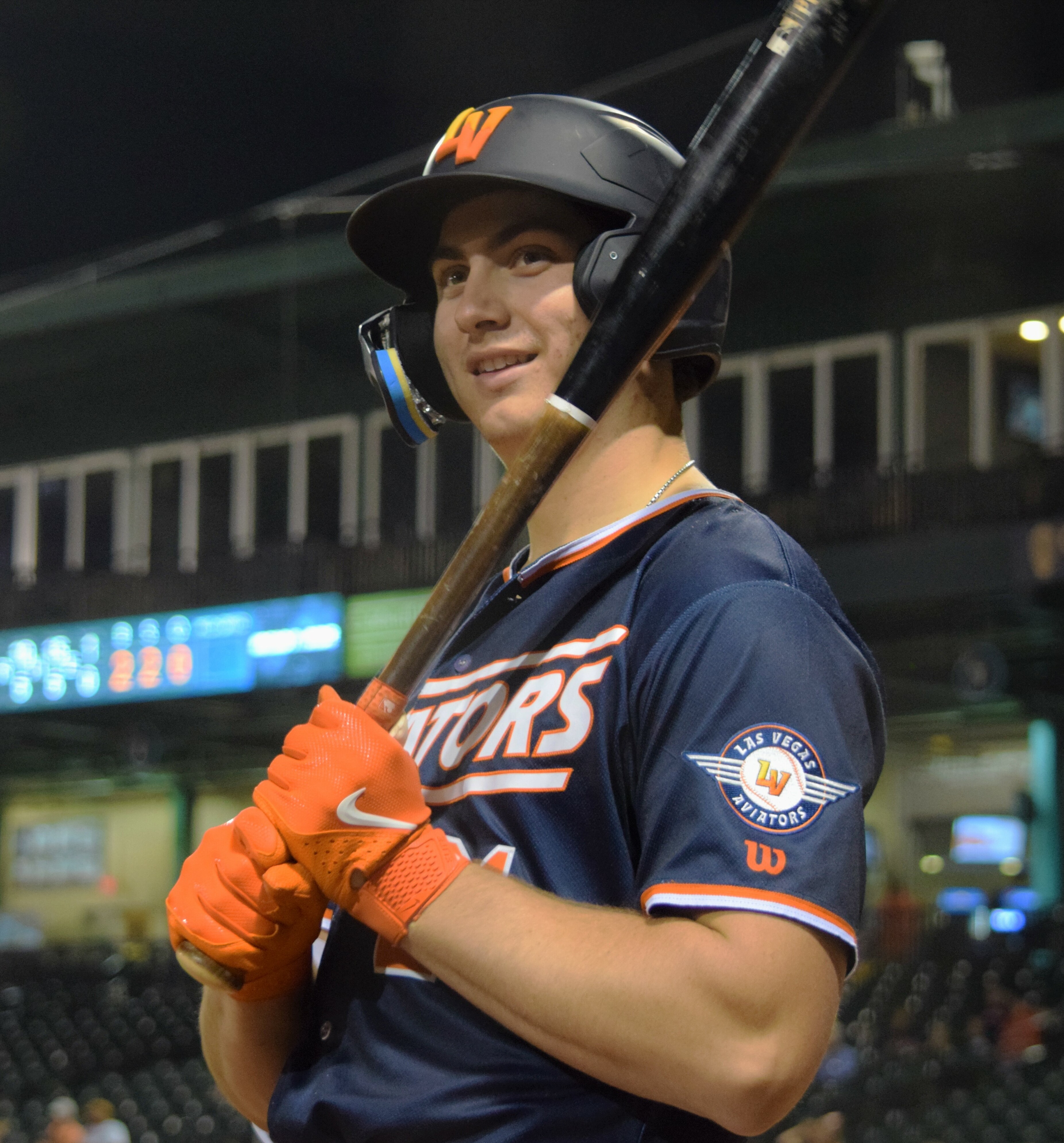
- Soderstrom with the Las Vegas Aviators in 2023

Athletics – No. 21
- First baseman / Left fielder
- Born: November 24, 2001 (age 24); Turlock, California, U.S.
- Bats: Left Throws: Right

MLB debut
- July 14, 2023, for the Oakland Athletics

MLB statistics (through 2026 season)
- Batting average: .249
- Home runs: 56
- Runs batted in: 182
- Stats at Baseball Reference

Teams
- Oakland Athletics / Athletics (2023–present)
Medals
Men's baseball
Representing United States
U-18 Baseball World Cup
Silver medal – second place	2019 Gijang	Team

Tyler Christian Soderstrom (SOH-dər-strəm; born November 24, 2001) is an American professional baseball first baseman and left fielder for the Athletics of Major League Baseball (MLB). He was selected 26th overall by the Athletics in the 2020 MLB draft and made his MLB debut in 2023.

== Amateur career ==
Soderstrom attended Turlock High School in Turlock, California, where he played baseball. In 2019, his junior year, he hit .450 with four home runs. That summer, he played in the 2019 Under Armour All-America Baseball Game. He also played for the 18U United States national baseball team, hitting .364. As a senior in 2020, he was named the Gatorade California Baseball Player of the Year after batting .357 over five games before the season was cut short due to the COVID-19 pandemic. He signed to play college baseball at UCLA.

== Professional career ==
=== Minor leagues ===
Soderstrom was considered one of the top prospects for the 2020 Major League Baseball draft. He was selected 26th overall by the Oakland Athletics, and signed with them for $3.3 million. He did not play a minor league game in 2020 due to the cancellation of the minor league season caused by the pandemic. To begin the 2021 season, he was assigned to the Stockton Ports of the Low-A West. In June, Soderstrom was selected to play in the All-Star Futures Game at Coors Field. After not playing in a game since July 23, he was placed on the injured list on August 16 with a back injury and missed the remainder of the season. Over 57 games with Stockton, Soderstrom slashed .306/.390/.568 with 12 home runs, 49 RBI, and twenty doubles.

Soderstrom was assigned to the Lansing Lugnuts of the High-A Midwest League to begin the 2022 season. In early August, he was promoted to the Midland RockHounds of the Double-A Texas League. Near the season's end, he was promoted to the Las Vegas Aviators of the Triple-A Pacific Coast League. Over 134 games between the three teams, he slashed .267/.324/.501 with 29 home runs and 105 RBI.

To open the 2023 season, Soderstrom was assigned to Las Vegas. He was selected to represent the Athletics at the 2023 All-Star Futures Game. In 69 games for Las Vegas, he batted .254/.303/.536 with 20 home runs and 59 RBI.

=== Major leagues ===
On July 14, 2023, Soderstrom was selected to the 40-man roster and promoted to the major leagues for the first time. He made his MLB debut that night at the Oakland Coliseum versus the Minnesota Twins. He recorded his first MLB hit, an infield single, off Gavin Stone of the Los Angeles Dodgers on July 15. Soderstrom hit his first MLB home run on August 4 at Dodger Stadium off of Emmet Sheehan. He was optioned to Las Vegas on August 21 and recalled September 1. In 45 games during his first big league season, Soderstrom hit .160 with three home runs.

Soderstrom was optioned to Triple–A Las Vegas to begin the 2024 season. On May 10, he was recalled from Las Vegas and hit a home run in his first game back with Oakland. He missed two months during the season due to a bone bruise in his left wrist. Soderstrom finished 2024 having appeared in 61 games with nine home runs, 24 RBI, and an OPS+ of 114 at the major league level.

In 2025, Soderstrom opened the season as the starting first baseman for Athletics. He had three two-homer games within the first 17 games of the season, becoming just the fifth player of all-time to do so. Across 158 appearances for the Athletics, Soderstrom batted .276/.346/.474 with 25 home runs and 93 RBI. On December 25, 2025, Soderstrom and the Athletics agreed to a seven-year, $86 million contract extension.

Soderstrom made 109 appearances for the Athletics during the 2026 season, slashing .245/.338/.472 with 19 home runs and 56 RBI. On August 16, 2026, he was placed on the injured list due to a left hip impingement. Two days later, it was announced that Soderstrom would undergo season–ending hip surgery.

== Personal life ==
Soderstrom's father, Steve Soderstrom, was selected sixth overall by the San Francisco Giants in the 1993 Major League Baseball draft, but appeared in only three Major League games in his pitching career.

Soderstrom and his wife, Bailey, were married in November 2025 in Hawaii.
