= Victor Söderström =

Victor Söderström may refer to:

- Victor Söderström (ice hockey) (born 2001)
- Victor Söderström (footballer) (born 1994)
