= Anthony Harding =

Anthony Harding may refer to:

- Anthony Harding (diver) (born 2000), British diver
- Tony Harding (Anthony John Harding, 1942–2014), British illustrator
- Anthony Harding (archaeologist) (born 1946), British archaeologist

== See also ==
- Antony Harding, British musician
