= Kevin Kramer =

American baseball player (born 1993)

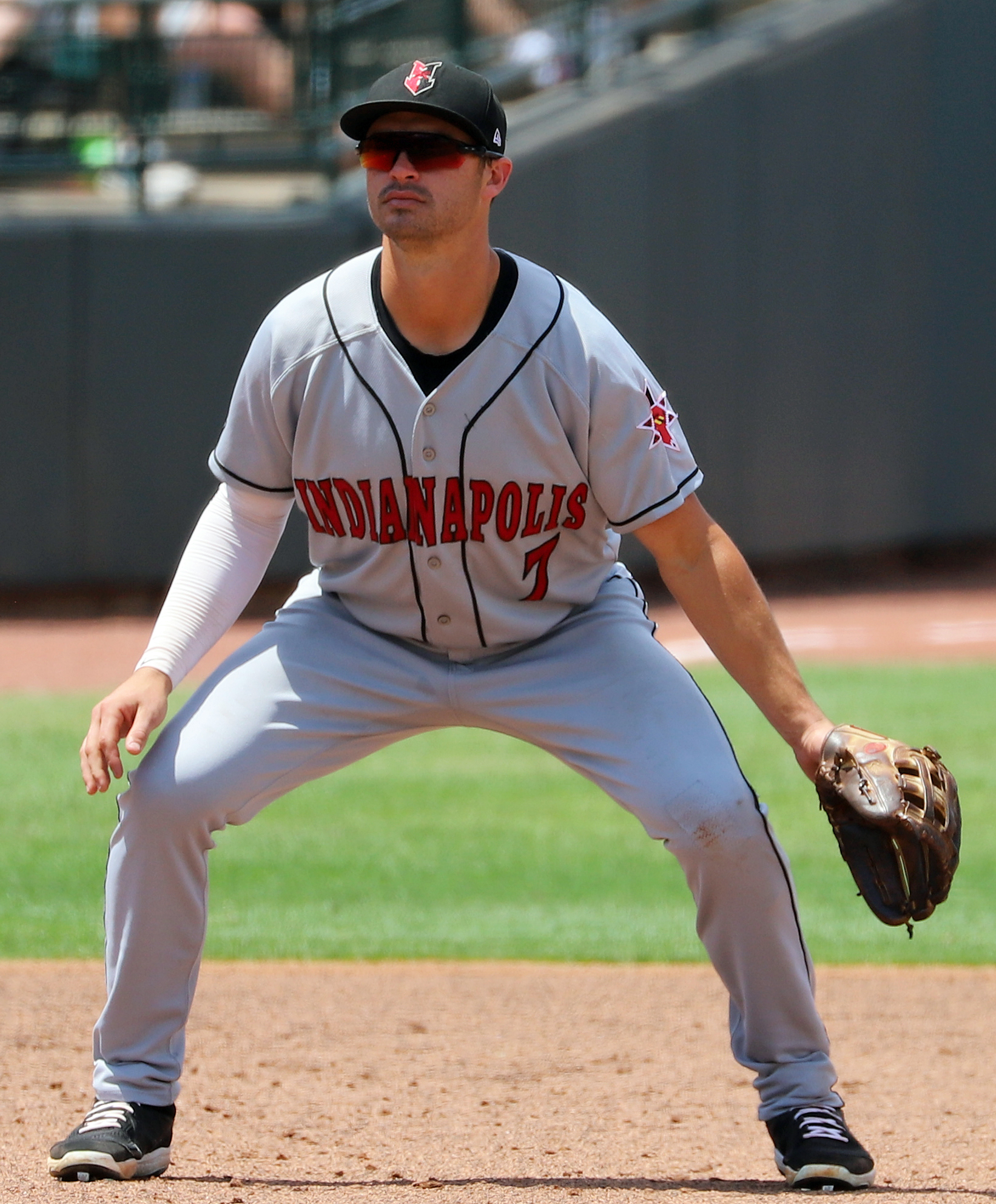
- Kramer with the Indianapolis Indians in 2021
- Second baseman / Third baseman / Outfielder
- Born: October 3, 1993 (age 32); Turlock, California, U.S.
- Batted: Left Threw: Right

MLB debut
- September 5, 2018, for the Pittsburgh Pirates

Last MLB appearance
- September 29, 2019, for the Pittsburgh Pirates

MLB statistics
- Batting average: .152
- Home runs: 0
- Runs batted in: 9
- Stats at Baseball Reference

Teams
- Pittsburgh Pirates (2018–2019)

Kevin Lowell Kramer (born October 3, 1993) is an American former professional baseball second baseman. He played in Major League Baseball (MLB) for the Pittsburgh Pirates in 2018 and 2019.

== Amateur career ==
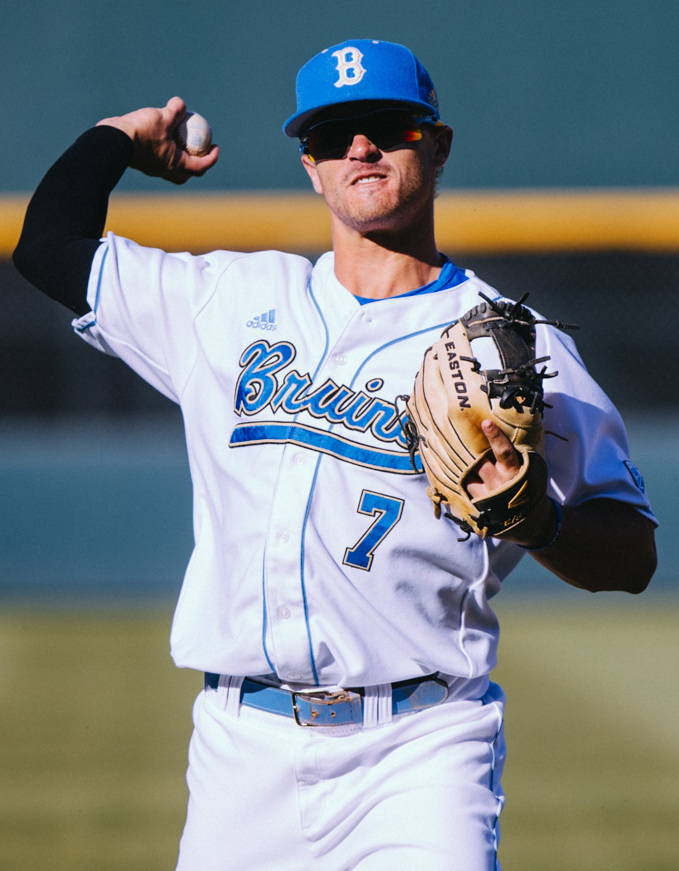
Kramer at UCLA in 2015

Kramer attended Turlock High School in Turlock, California. He was drafted by the Cleveland Indians in the 25th round of the 2011 Major League Baseball draft, but did not sign and attended the University of California, Los Angeles (UCLA), where he played college baseball for the Bruins. In 2013, he played collegiate summer baseball with the Orleans Firebirds of the Cape Cod Baseball League.

== Professional career ==
=== Pittsburgh Pirates ===
After his junior year, he was drafted by the Pittsburgh Pirates in the second round of the 2015 Major League Baseball draft.

Kramer made his professional debut with the Low-A West Virginia Black Bears and was promoted to the Single-A West Virginia Power during the season. In 58 total games between the two teams, he batted .291 with 20 RBIs. He played 2016 with the High-A Bradenton Marauders where he posted a .277 batting average with four home runs and 57 RBIs in 118 games. In 2017, Kramer played with the Double-A Altoona Curve, batting .297 with six home runs and 27 RBIs in 53 games before a fractured right hand ended his season in June.

Kramer began the 2018 season with the Triple-A Indianapolis Indians of the International League and was called up to the majors for the first time on September 4. He made his MLB debut the next day as a pinch hitter against the Cincinnati Reds. In 21 games with Pittsburgh, Kramer slashed .135/.175/.135 with 4 RBI. Kramer spent the majority of the 2019 season with Indianapolis, playing in only 22 games with the Pirates, with whom he batted .167/.260/.190 with 5 RBI.

On May 20, 2020, Kramer underwent surgery on his right hip, and missed the entire 2020 season. On October 30, Kramer was outrighted off of the 40-man roster. He began the 2021 season with Indianapolis, where he batted .196/.318/.296 with 3 home runs and 22 RBI in 51 games.

=== Milwaukee Brewers ===
On July 4, 2021, Kramer was traded to the Milwaukee Brewers in exchange for Nathan Kirby. He played in 23 games for the Triple-A Nashville Sounds, slashing .245/.379/.321 with no home runs and 4 RBI. On August 17, Kramer was released by the Brewers organization.

On June 1, 2022, Kramer affirmed that he had retired from professional baseball and has since started his own solar power firm after his release from the Brewers organization.

== Personal ==
Kramer and his wife, Riley, welcomed their first child, a daughter, in November 2019.
