= Turlock, California =

City in California, United States

- City in California
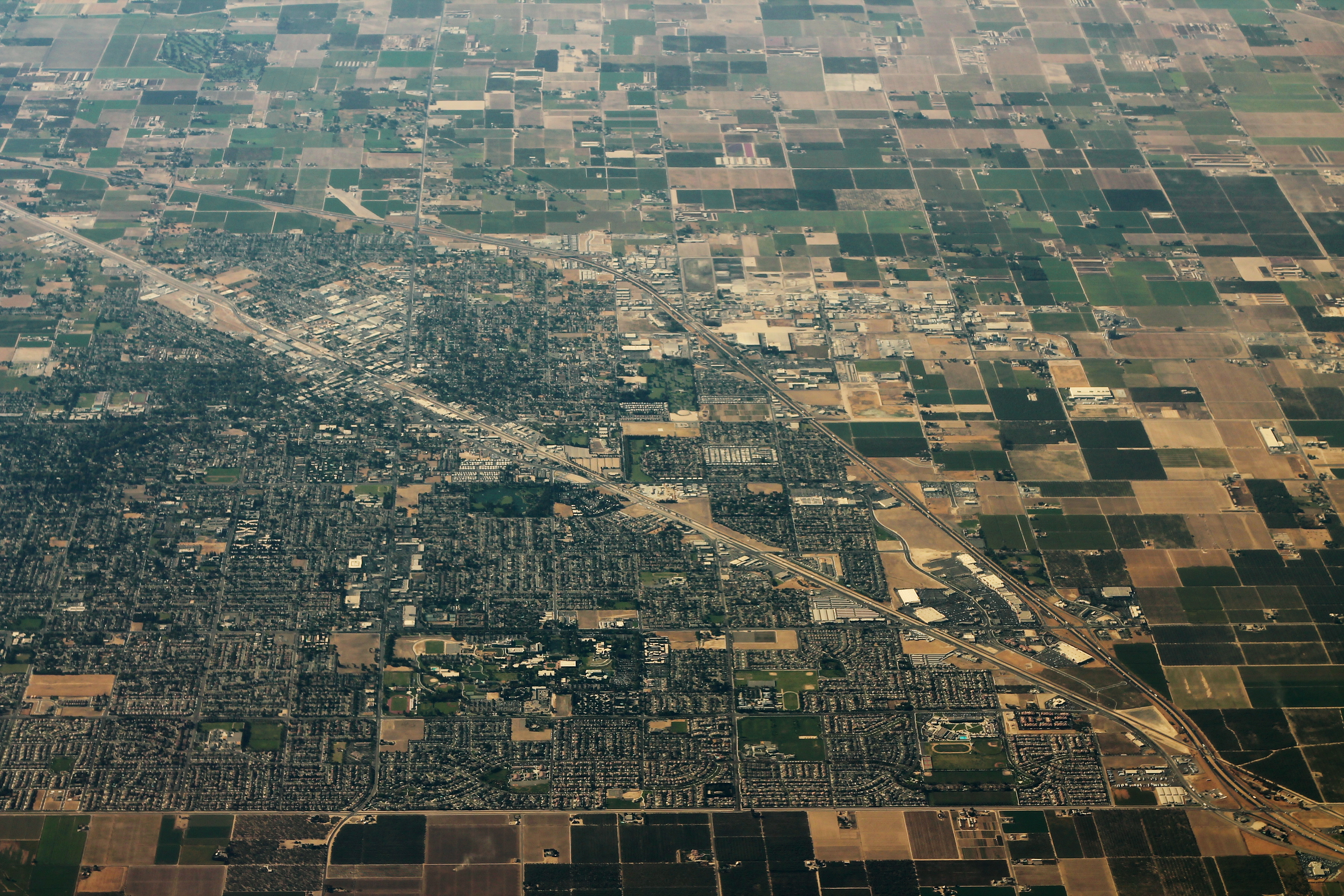
- Aerial view of Turlock
- Interactive map of Turlock, California
- Location in the United States
- Coordinates: 37°30′21″N 120°50′56″W
- Country: United States
- State: California
- County: Stanislaus
- Incorporated: February 15, 1908

Government
  - Type: Council–manager
  - Mayor: Amy Bublak (R)
  - Vice Mayor: Rebecka Monez
  - Councilmember District 1: Kevin Bixel
  - Councilmember District 3: Cassandra Abram
  - Councilmember District 4: Erika Phillips

Area
  - Total: 16.93 sq mi (43.85 km^{2})
  - Land: 16.90 sq mi (43.78 km^{2})
  - Water: 0.027 sq mi (0.07 km^{2}) 0%
- Elevation: 102 ft (31 m)

Population (2020)
  - Total: 72,740
  - Density: 4,303/sq mi (1,661/km^{2})
- Time zone: UTC−8 (Pacific)
  - Summer (DST): UTC−7 (PDT)
- ZIP codes: 95380–95382
- Area code: 209
- FIPS code: 06-80812
- GNIS feature IDs: 277622, 2412114
- Website: www.cityofturlock.org

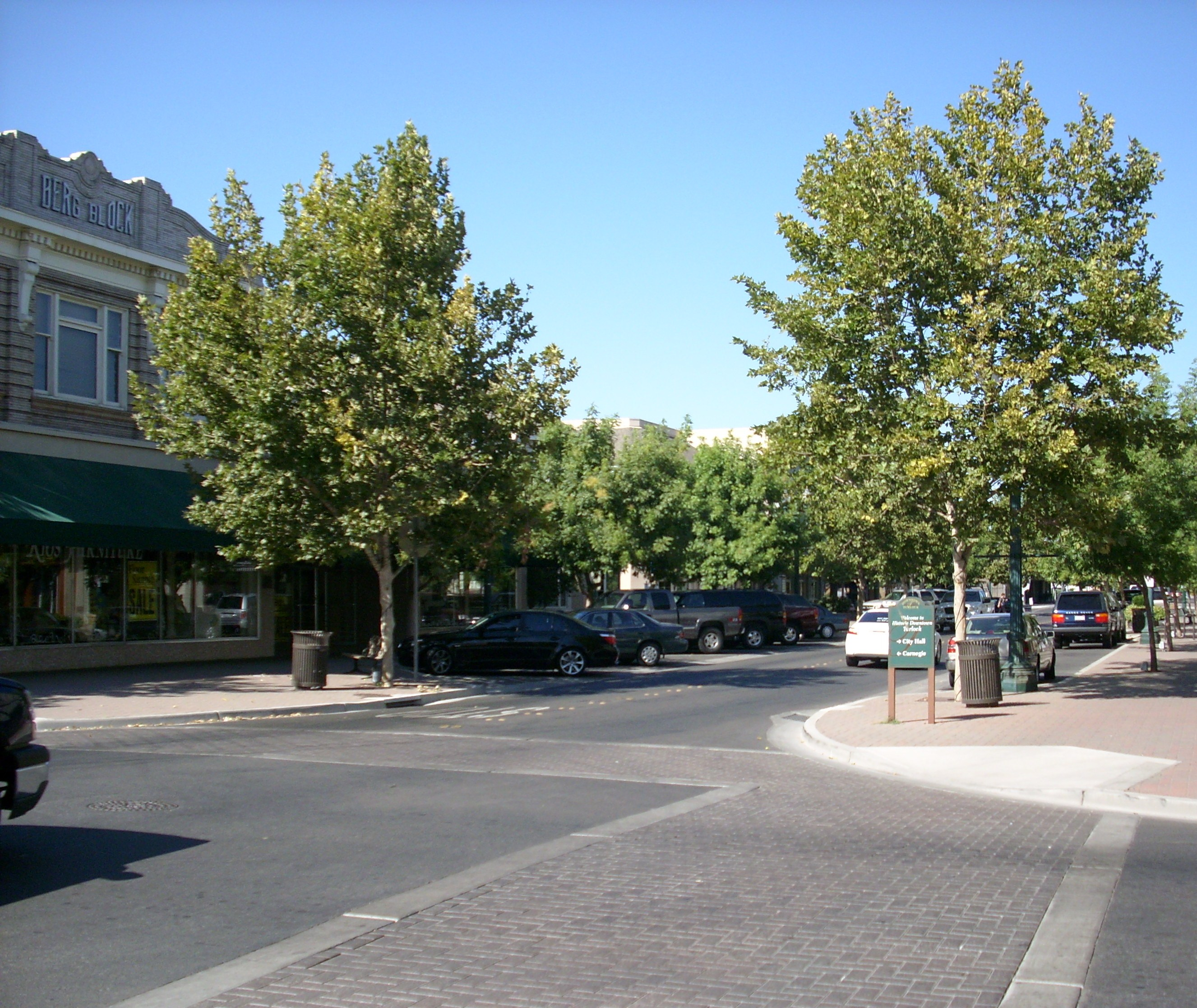
Main Street in Turlock

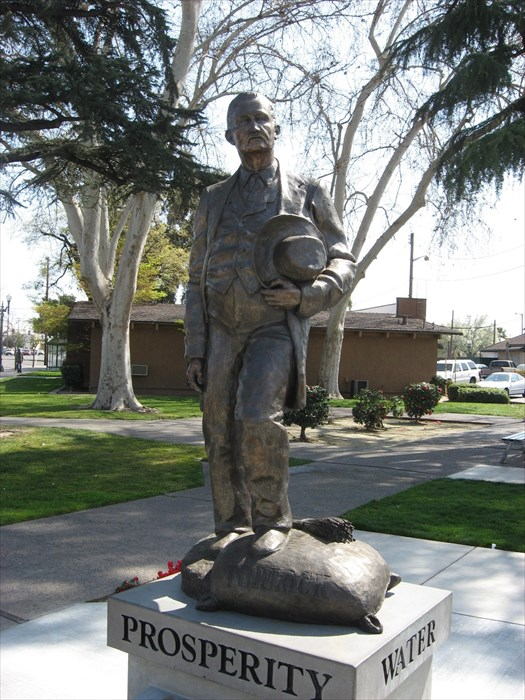
John W. Mitchell statue located at Turlock's downtown Central Park

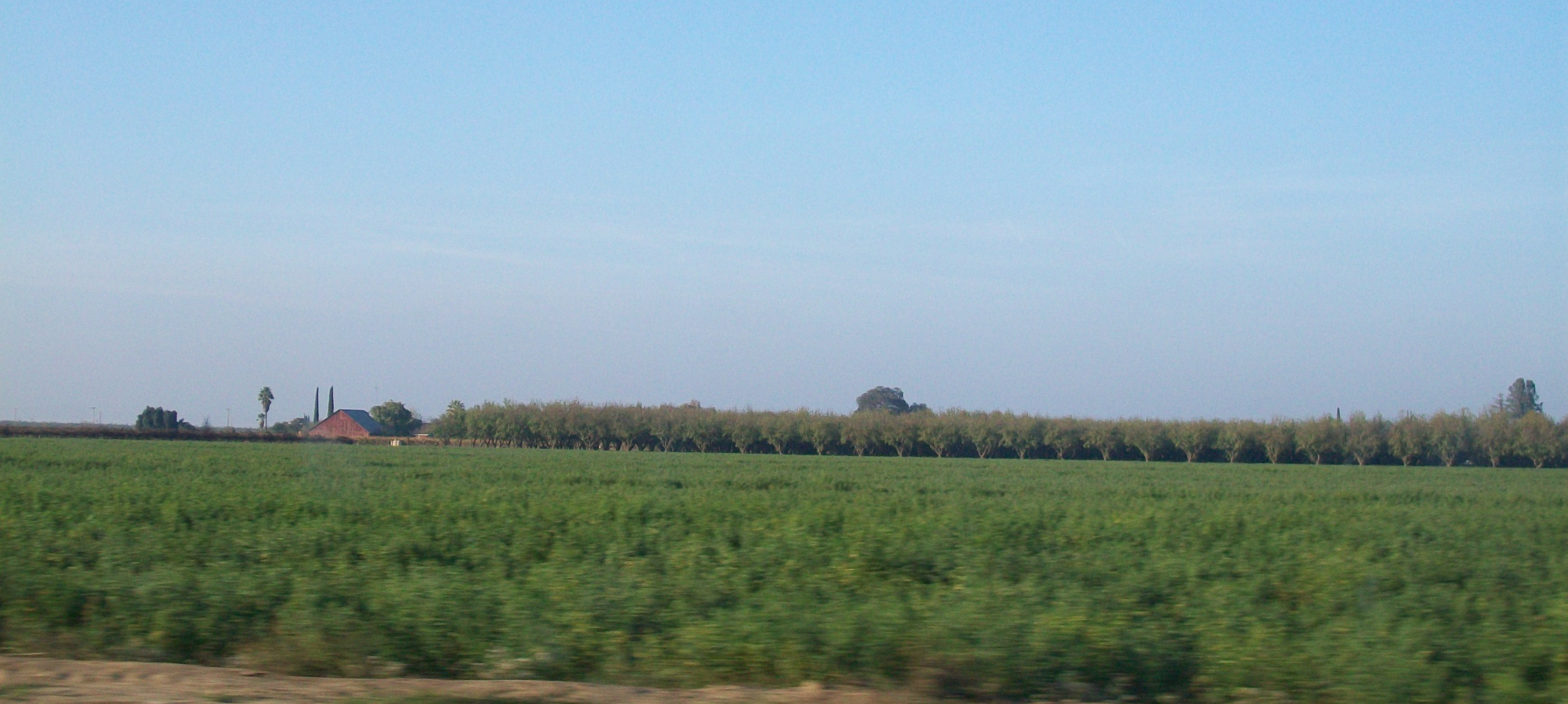
Various agriculture fields in Turlock

Turlock is a city in Stanislaus County, California, United States. Its population was 72,740 at the 2020 United States census, making it the second-largest city in Stanislaus County after Modesto. The city is home to California State University, Stanislaus.

== History ==
Founded on December 22, 1871, by prominent grain farmer John William Mitchell, the town consisted of a post office, a depot, a grain warehouse and a few other buildings. Mitchell declined the honor of having the town named for himself. The name "Turlock" was then chosen instead. The name is believed to originate from the Irish village of Turlough. In October 1870, Harper's Weekly published an excerpt from English novelist James Payn's story Bred in the Bone, which includes the mention of a town named "Turlock". Local historians believe that the issue of Harper's Weekly was read by early resident H.W. Lander, who suggested the alternate name.

Mitchell and his brother were successful businessmen, buying land and developing large herds of cattle and sheep that were sold to gold miners and others as they arrived. They were also leaders in wheat farming and cultivated tracts of land under the tenant system. Eventually, the Mitchells owned most of the area, over 100,000 acres, from Keyes to Atwater. In the early 20th century, 20-acre lots from the Mitchell estate were sold for $20 an acre.

While it grew to be a relatively prosperous and busy hub of activity throughout the end of the 19th century, it was not incorporated as a city until February 15, 1908. By that time intensive agricultural development surrounded most of the city (agriculture remains the major economic force in the region in current times). Many of the initial migrants to the region were Swedish. As an early San Francisco Chronicle article stated of the region and the community's lacteal productivity, "you have to hand it to the Scandinavians for knowing how to run a dairy farm."

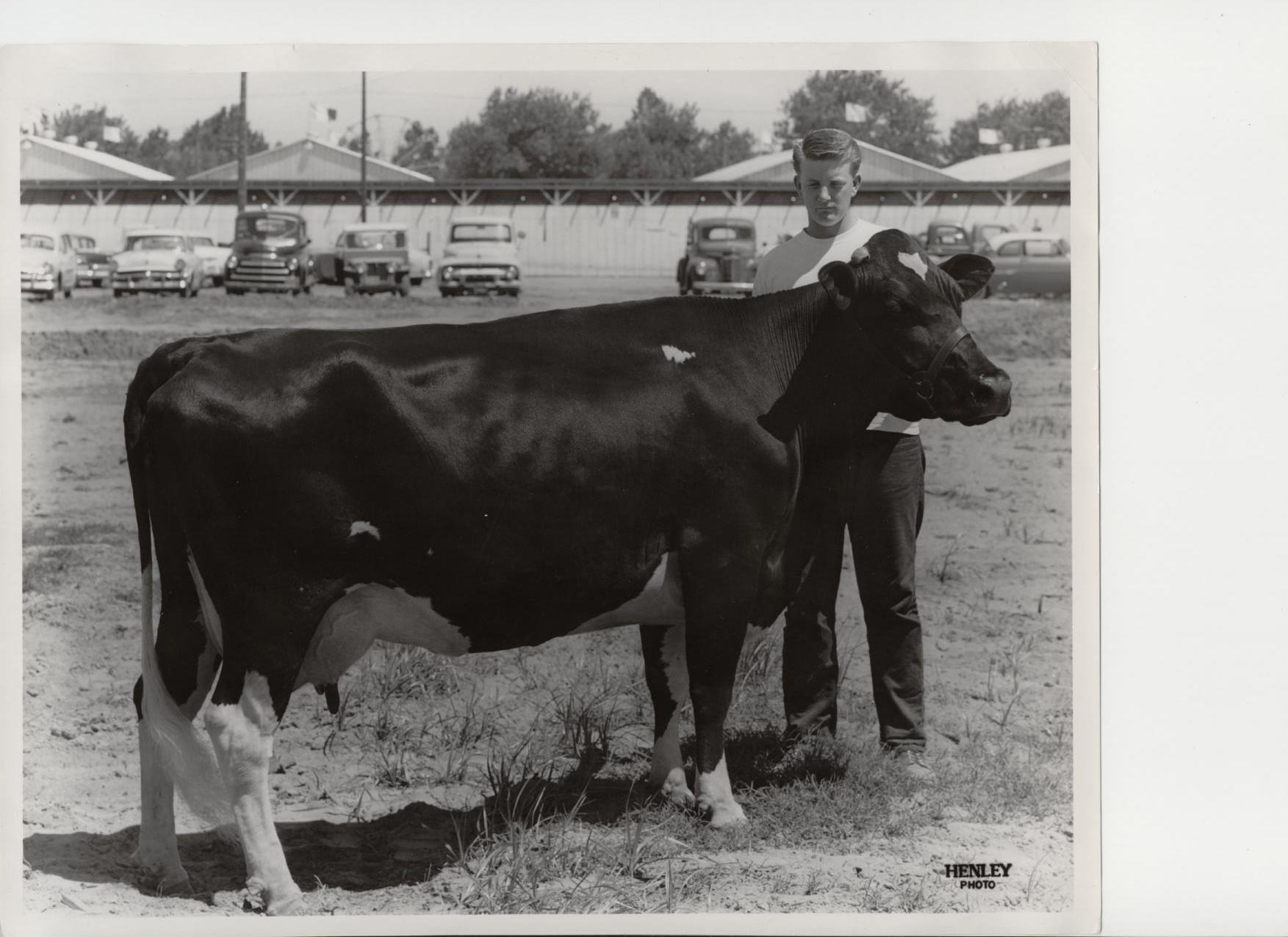
Cow exhibition at Stanislaus County Fair located in Turlock

Turlock went on to become known as the "Heart of the Valley" because of its agricultural production. With the boom came racial and labor strife. In July 1921, a mob of 150 white men evicted 60 Japanese cantaloupe pickers from rooming houses and ranches near Turlock, taking them and their belongings on trucks out of town. The white workers claimed they were being undercut by the Japanese who were working for lower wages. In protest, fruit growers briefly threatened not to hire any white workers who supported the eviction, preferring to let their melons rot on the vines, rather than hire such characters. As a result of this stance, the eviction had the opposite effect of what the mob had intended. By August 1921, Japanese workers had returned to the Turlock area and were nearly the only people employed to pick melons.

The incident gained national attention, and California Governor William Stephens vowed that justice would be served. Six men were promptly arrested but were apparently untroubled by the charges, stating that leaders of Turlock's American Legion and Chamber of Commerce had told them that no trouble would result from their actions. Although a former Turlock night watchman testified that one of the accused had disclosed a plan "to clean up Turlock of the Japs," all six men were acquitted.

An editorial in the July 22, 1921 edition of the San Francisco Chronicle opposed both the evictions and Japanese labor, with one column stating that "we in California are determined that Oriental workers shall be kept out of the state. But that does not mean that the decent citizens of California will tolerate for one moment such proceedings as the attack of a mob on the Japanese cantaloupe workers in the Turlock district."

In 1930, Turlock's population was 20% Assyrian. They were such a significant part of the population that the southern part of town even became referred to as Little Urmia, referring to the region of northwestern Iran from which most had come. In the 1930s, Turlock was cited by Ripley's Believe It or Not as having the most churches per capita in the US, which had partly to do with the variety of ethnic churches established for the relatively small settler population. Various religious centers reflecting a diverse population, such as Sikh Gurdwaras, various Assyrian Christian churches, and many mainline Protestant, Mormon and Roman Catholic churches have been built.

During World War II, after the attack on Pearl Harbor, the US government placed Japanese Americans into concentration camps all over the country. The Stanislaus County Fairgrounds was the site of one of 15 temporary "assembly centers" and held 3,669 Japanese Americans, most of whom were US citizens. The US Army also built the Ballico Auxiliary Field (1942–1946) for training pilots in Turlock.

In 1960, California State University, Stanislaus, opened to students, helping to spur growth in the city as the university expanded in its early years. In the 1970s, State Route 99 (formerly U.S. Route 99) was completed through the area, largely bypassing the then-incorporated areas of Turlock in a route to the west of the city through mostly undeveloped land. Since that time, the city has grown westward considerably to meet the freeway's north–south path, but urban development west of the freeway has only recently begun to take hold. In an attempt to allow for orderly growth of the city, comprehensive growth master plans have established urban growth boundaries since the 1960s.

In the 1980s, Turlock experienced extensive growth of both residential and commercial areas, following a statewide boom in housing demand and construction. The housing boom of the 1980s diminished in the early 1990s but increased again in the second half of the decade, partly as a result of growth in the San Francisco Bay Area, which placed a higher demand for more affordable housing in outlying areas. After the dot-com bust, housing demand intensified, producing much higher housing prices in an area formerly known for affordable housing. A recent boom in the retail sector has produced considerable growth along the Highway 99 corridor. Turlock reached its northern urban growth boundary, Taylor Road, in the late 1990s, and growth beyond it is restricted by the city's Master Plan.

The Stanislaus County Fairgrounds are located in Turlock. Before the land was known as Stanislaus County Fairgrounds it was first known as Melon Carnival because of its crop of cantaloupes, the main source of Turlock's economy. In 1911, the first Melon Carnival was held in downtown Turlock. Eventually, the Melon Carnival became the Stanislaus County Fair and was held at the Stanislaus County Fairgrounds. Promoting agriculture, entertainment and technology with the help of the community, is the main mission of the Stanislaus County fairgrounds.

== Geography ==
Turlock is located approximately 300 miles (480 km) northwest of Los Angeles, between the cities of Modesto and Merced in Stanislaus County at the intersection of State Route 99 and State Route 165.

According to the United States Census Bureau, the town has a total area of 16.9 square miles (44 km^{2}), all land.

=== Climate ===
Turlock has hot, mostly dry summers and cool, wet winters. Average January temperatures are a maximum of 53.7 °F (12.1 °C) and a minimum of 38.1 °F (3.4 °C). Average July temperatures are a maximum of 104.4 °F (40.2 °C) and a minimum of 62.6 °F (17.0 °C). There are an average of 78.0 days with highs of 90 °F (32 °C) or higher and an average of 19.8 days with lows of 32 °F (0 °C) or lower. The record high temperature was 114 °F (46 °C) on July 9, 1896. The record low temperature was 18 °F (−8 °C) on January 21, 1922, and December 19, 1924.

The average annual precipitation is 11.88 inches (302 mm). There are an average of 48 days with measurable precipitation. The wettest year was 1983 with 27.03 inches (687 mm) and the driest year was 1953 with 5.32 inches (135 mm). The most precipitation in one month was 8.47 inches (215 mm) in February 1998. The most precipitation in 24 hours was 2.70 inches (69 mm) on December 11, 1906. Although snow is very rare in Turlock, 3.0 inches (76 mm) fell in January 1922 and 2.0 inches (51 mm) fell in February 1976.

Climate data for Turlock, California, 1991–2020 normals, extremes 1894–present
Month	Jan	Feb	Mar	Apr	May	Jun	Jul	Aug	Sep	Oct	Nov	Dec	Year
Record high °F (°C)	75 (24)	79 (26)	90 (32)	96 (36)	103 (39)	111 (44)	114 (46)	113 (45)	106 (41)	100 (38)	85 (29)	73 (23)	114 (46)
Mean daily maximum °F (°C)	54.9 (12.7)	61.1 (16.2)	66.9 (19.4)	72.1 (22.3)	80.1 (26.7)	87.8 (31.0)	93.0 (33.9)	91.8 (33.2)	87.5 (30.8)	77.2 (25.1)	64.2 (17.9)	55.0 (12.8)	74.3 (23.5)
Daily mean °F (°C)	48.5 (9.2)	53.2 (11.8)	57.7 (14.3)	62.0 (16.7)	68.7 (20.4)	75.1 (23.9)	79.4 (26.3)	78.3 (25.7)	74.8 (23.8)	66.3 (19.1)	55.6 (13.1)	48.4 (9.1)	64.0 (17.8)
Mean daily minimum °F (°C)	42.2 (5.7)	45.4 (7.4)	48.5 (9.2)	52.0 (11.1)	57.3 (14.1)	62.4 (16.9)	65.8 (18.8)	64.8 (18.2)	62.1 (16.7)	55.4 (13.0)	46.9 (8.3)	41.9 (5.5)	53.7 (12.1)
Record low °F (°C)	18 (−8)	21 (−6)	25 (−4)	28 (−2)	34 (1)	40 (4)	43 (6)	41 (5)	37 (3)	32 (0)	21 (−6)	18 (−8)	18 (−8)
Average precipitation inches (mm)	2.63 (67)	2.29 (58)	1.85 (47)	0.93 (24)	0.59 (15)	0.12 (3.0)	trace	0.01 (0.25)	0.03 (0.76)	0.61 (15)	1.07 (27)	2.26 (57)	12.39 (315)
Average precipitation days (≥ 0.01 in)	10.4	10.3	8.9	4.8	2.9	0.9	0.1	0.2	0.5	2.6	5.8	9.8	57.2
Source: NOAA

== Demographics ==
Historical population
Census	Pop.	Note	%±
1880	175		—
1890	203		16.0%
1910	1,573		—
1920	3,394		115.8%
1930	4,276		26.0%
1940	4,839		13.2%
1950	6,235		28.8%
1960	9,116		46.2%
1970	13,992		53.5%
1980	26,287		87.9%
1990	42,198		60.5%
2000	55,810		32.3%
2010	68,549		22.8%
2020	72,740		6.1%
U.S. Decennial Census

=== 2020 census ===
As of the 2020 census, Turlock had a population of 72,740. The population density was 4,302.9 inhabitants per square mile (1,661.4/km^{2}). The age distribution was 24.8% under the age of 18, 10.8% aged 18 to 24, 26.8% aged 25 to 44, 22.6% aged 45 to 64, and 15.0% who were 65 years of age or older. The median age was 35.1 years. For every 100 females, there were 93.8 males, and for every 100 females age 18 and over, there were 89.8 males.

The census reported that 97.3% of the population lived in households, 1.9% lived in non-institutionalized group quarters, and 0.9% were institutionalized. There were 24,163 households, out of which 37.8% had children under the age of 18 living in them, 49.8% were married-couple households, 7.0% were cohabiting couple households, 27.1% had a female householder with no spouse or partner present, and 16.1% had a male householder with no spouse or partner present. 21.1% of households were one person, and 10.0% had someone living alone who was 65 years of age or older. The average household size was 2.93. There were 17,490 families (72.4% of all households).

There were 25,105 housing units at an average density of 1,485.1 units per square mile (573.4 units/km^{2}), of which 24,163 (96.2%) were occupied. Of the occupied units, 54.6% were owner-occupied and 45.4% were occupied by renters. Of all housing units, 3.8% were vacant. The homeowner vacancy rate was 1.1% and the rental vacancy rate was 4.1%.

99.5% of residents lived in urban areas, while 0.5% lived in rural areas.

Racial composition as of the 2020 census
Race	Number	Percent
White	38,371	52.8%
Black or African American	1,529	2.1%
American Indian and Alaska Native	1,490	2.0%
Asian	5,465	7.5%
Native Hawaiian and Other Pacific Islander	320	0.4%
Some other race	15,203	20.9%
Two or more races	10,362	14.2%
Hispanic or Latino (of any race)	29,965	41.2%

=== Income and poverty ===
In 2023, the US Census Bureau estimated that the median household income was $79,807, and the per capita income was $36,306. About 8.2% of families and 10.8% of the population were below the poverty line.

=== 2010 census ===
The 2010 United States Census reported that Turlock had a population of 69,733. The population density was 4,049.4 inhabitants per square mile (1,563.5/km^{2}). The racial makeup of Turlock was 47,864 (69.8%) White, 1,160 (1.7%) African American, 601 (0.9%) Native American, 3,865 (5.6%) Asian, 313 (0.5%) Pacific Islander, 11,328 (16.5%) from other races, and 3,418 (5.0%) from two or more races. Hispanic or Latino of any race were 24,957 persons (36.4%). The Census reported that 67,342 people (98.2% of the population) lived in households, 687 (1.0%) lived in non-institutionalized group quarters, and 520 (0.8%) were institutionalized.

There were 22,772 households, out of which 9,339 (41.0%) had children under the age of 18 living in them, 12,055 (52.9%) were opposite-sex married couples living together, 3,161 (13.9%) had a female householder with no husband present, 1,453 (6.4%) had a male householder with no wife present. There were 1,387 (6.1%) unmarried opposite-sex partnerships, and 153 (0.7%) same-sex married couples or partnerships. 4,755 households (20.9%) were made up of individuals, and 2,058 (9.0%) had someone living alone who was 65 years of age or older. The average household size was 2.96. There were 16,669 families (73.2% of all households); the average family size was 3.45. The population was spread out, with 18,820 people (27.5%) under the age of 18, 8,087 people (11.8%) aged 18 to 24, 18,313 people (26.7%) aged 25 to 44, 15,317 people (22.3%) aged 45 to 64, and 8,012 people (11.7%) who were 65 years of age or older. The median age was 32.5 years. For every 100 females, there were 94.8 males. For every 100 females age 18 and over, there were 90.9 males.

There were 24,627 housing units at an average density of 1,454.8 units per square mile (561.7 units/km^{2}), of which 12,622 (55.4%) were owner-occupied, and 10,150 (44.6%) were occupied by renters. The homeowner vacancy rate was 2.6%; the rental vacancy rate was 9.0%. 37,867 people (55.2% of the population) lived in owner-occupied housing units and 29,475 people (43.0%) lived in rental housing units.

=== Ancestry ===
4.9% of Turlock's population reported ancestry in the category Assyrian. This was the fourth highest percentage in the United States for this category, the highest for a community outside of Oakland County, Michigan and the only one of the top seven places in this category that was not one of Detroit's northern suburbs.

Culturally, the area is home to large concentrations of Americans of South Asian descent (particularly Sikhs), Mexican-Americans, and people of varied European descent. Swedes and Portuguese were early settlers to the area. Continued immigration from the Azores Islands (Portugal) in recent decades has established a large Portuguese-speaking community within the city. Turlock is a major center for the Assyrian community in the United States, who began to arrive in the 1910s seeking opportunities in farming. By 1924 the Assyrian Evangelical Church was established and by the 1950s, 8% of the population of Turlock was Assyrian. There was an increased influx into Turlock in the 1970s following political strife in Iraq and in the 1980s following the 1979 Islamic Revolution in Iran.

== Economy ==
Foster Farms, Emanuel Medical Center, and Turlock Unified School District are the largest employers in Turlock. MedicAlert, a non-profit, charitable, and membership-based organization for 24/7 medical response information, has been based in Turlock since its founding in 1956. La Perla Tapatía Supermarkets is headquartered in Turlock.

== Sports ==
The indoor soccer team the Turlock Cal Express of the Major Arena Soccer League 2 (MASL2) plays at the Turlock Indoor Soccer Complex. Turlock is home to the California State University, Stanislaus Warriors in the National Collegiate Athletic Association (NCAA).

== Government ==
Turlock uses a Council–Manager form of government. It is led by a five-member City Council consisting of a Mayor and four Councilmembers. The Mayor is elected at-large, while each Councilmember is elected to one of four electoral districts. All five Councilmembers are elected to four-year terms. The Turlock City Council holds public meetings every second and fourth Tuesday of each month at 6:00 p.m. City Hall is located at 156 South Broadway in Turlock. A directly elected City Treasurer (Diana Lewis) also serves a four-year term.

In the California State Legislature, Turlock is in the 4th senatorial district, represented by Republican Marie Alvarado-Gil, and in the 22nd Assembly district, represented by Republican Juan Alanis.

In the United States House of Representatives, Turlock is split between California's 5th congressional district, represented by Republican Tom McClintock, and California's 13th congressional district, represented by Democrat Adam Gray.

== Education ==
=== College ===
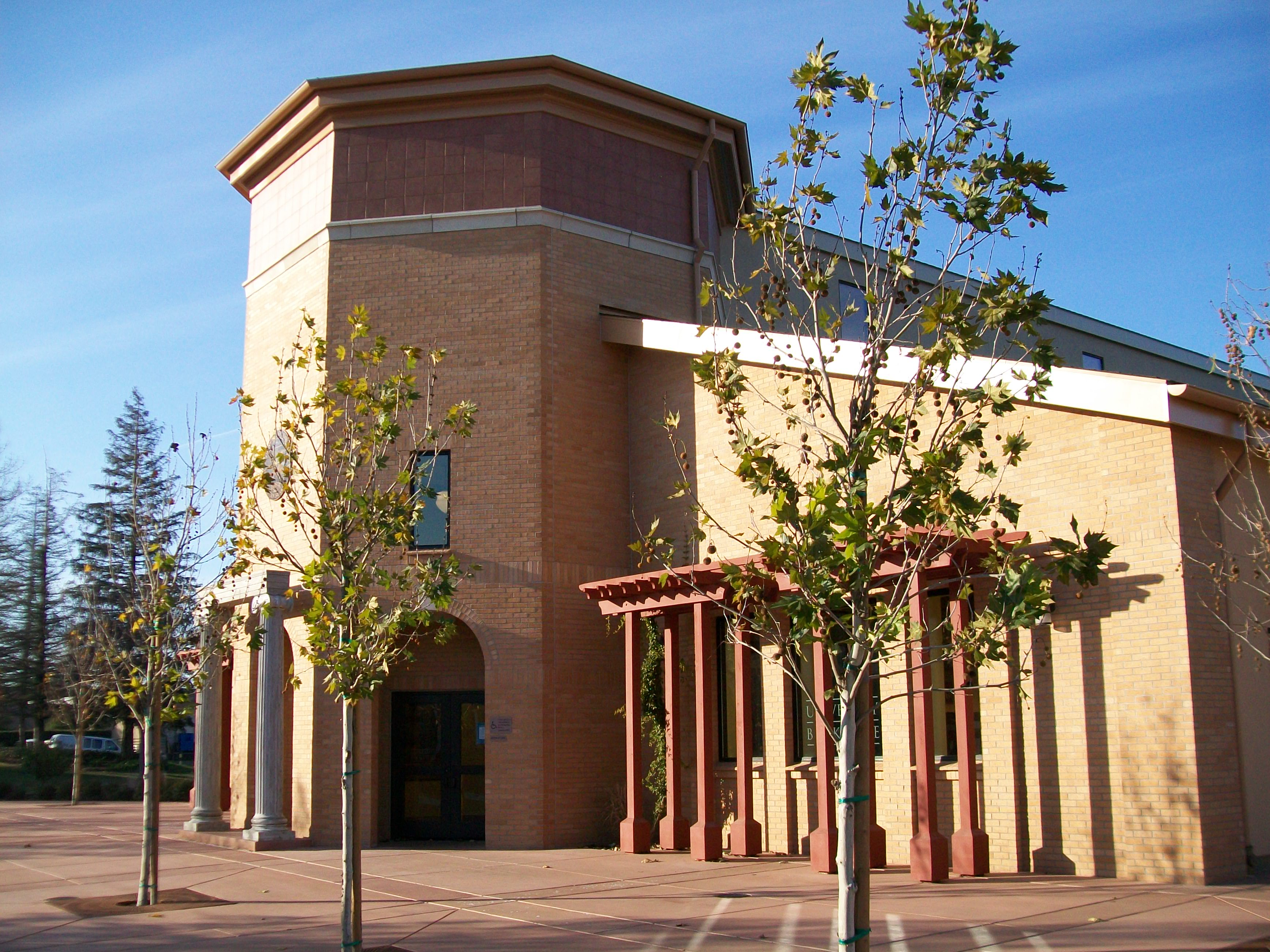
California State University, Stanislaus campus

Turlock is the home of California State University, Stanislaus, a liberal arts university, and part of the 23-campus California State University system. As of 2023, CSU Stanislaus reported a student population of 10,577 students, 9,244 of whom were undergraduate students.

=== Secondary ===
Turlock is home to two public high schools, Turlock High School and John H. Pitman High School, as well as a continuation high school, Roselawn High School, both being part of the Turlock Unified School District. Turlock High School, the first in the city, opened in 1907, and Pitman opened in a major growth zone of northern Turlock in 2002.

Turlock Christian High School is a private high school within the city. Classes are held at Monte Vista Chapel, a church in Turlock. Turlock has two junior high schools, two middle schools and nine elementary schools, one of which got California Distinguished School Award in 2012 and won $10,000 in a competition held by Scotties. The money gained from the competition helped the Turlock Unified School District recently purchase Chromebooks for school use.

=== Elementary ===
Turlock is home to Julien, Crowell, Wakefield, Osborn, Cunningham, Dennis Earl, Walnut, Medeiros and Brown Elementary Schools inside its city limits.

Osborn Two-Way Immersion Academy is a public elementary school that was opened in 1958 by E.B. Osborn. One of the school's main objectives is helping students become more proficient in both Spanish and English. One of the extracurricular activities offered there is Baile Folklórico, calling their dance troupe Los Luceros de Osborn, where they perform at the school, festivals, and even at Gallo.

== Media ==
The Turlock Journal, a local newspaper, has been in continuous operation since 1904. A digital local newspaper is the Turlock City News found it in 2009 focusing on Turlock news.

== Infrastructure ==
=== Transportation ===
Turlock Transit operates local bus service, while the Stanislaus Regional Transit Authority operates intercity routes that connect Turlock to other cities in Stanislaus County and to Dublin/Pleasanton station. An Altamont Corridor Express commuter rail station is planned to be constructed in Turlock for service starting in 2027. Amtrak serves Turlock at the nearby Turlock–Denair station.

== Notable people ==
- Richard L. Bare, television director (Green Acres, The Twilight Zone)
- Tom Brandstater, NFL player (Denver, Indianapolis, Miami, St. Louis, Dallas Cowboys)
- Tony Corbin, football player
- Alison Cox, Olympic silver medalist, women's rowing, Athens 2004
- Josh Harder, U.S. representative
- Lester Hayes, NFL athlete (Oakland Raiders)
- Doug James, rhythm and blues saxophonist
- Dot-Marie Jones, athlete and actress
- Colin Kaepernick, NFL quarterback
- Kevin Kramer, MLB athlete (Pittsburgh Pirates)
- Paul Larson, football player (Cal, Chicago Cardinals, Oakland Raiders)
- Brad Lesley, actor, MLB athlete (Cincinnati Reds, Milwaukee Brewers)
- Tommy Mendonca, MLB athlete (Philadelphia Phillies)
- James Mitchell, actor
- Cal Niday, auto racer
- Oliver O'Grady, Irish defrocked Catholic priest
- Jonathan Quinn, football player (Jacksonville Jaguars, Kansas City, Chicago Bears)
- Hayden Sargis, soccer player
- Steve Soderstrom, former MLB player
- Tyler Soderstrom, MLB baseball player for the Oakland Athletics
- Braiden Ward, Professional Baseball Outfielder
- Cory Williams, actor and YouTube personality

== In popular culture ==
Turlock and Turlock High School are briefly mentioned in the 1973 film American Graffiti.

On the Grateful Dead's live album Europe '72, Bob Weir precedes the song "Truckin'" with the following introduction:

Of course, by now I needn't tell you that this next number rose straight to the top of the charts in Turlock, California (Cheers). Numero Uno and it stayed there for a week or two. They love us in Turlock, and we love them for that.

In the 1960s, radio advertisements by Central Valley-based Foster Farms said, "turkeys from Turlock."

== See also ==
- California Historical Landmarks in Stanislaus County, California
