= Jocelyn Moore (businesswoman) =

American football executive

Jocelyn Moore is an American National Football League official who serves as executive vice president of communications and public affairs. She was hired by the NFL in 2016 as the Vice President for Public Policy and Government Affairs, and was promoted to her current position in 2018. Prior to working for the NFL, Moore was the managing director of The Glover Park Group.

In September 2018, Moore testified in front of the United States House Judiciary Subcommittee on Crime, Terrorism and Homeland Security regarding the creation of a federal framework for legalized sports betting.
