= 2024 Tampa Bay Rays season =

Major League Baseball season

2024 Tampa Bay Rays
- League: American League
- Division: East
- Ballpark: Tropicana Field
- City: St. Petersburg, Florida
- Record: 80–82 (.494)
- Divisional place: 4th
- Owners: Stuart Sternberg
- President of baseball operations: Erik Neander
- Manager: Kevin Cash
- Television: Bally Sports Sun
- Radio: Tampa Bay Rays Radio Network (English); WGES (Spanish)

The 2024 Tampa Bay Rays season was the 27th season of the Tampa Bay Rays franchise, and their 17th as the Rays. They played their home games at Tropicana Field as members of Major League Baseball's American League East.

The Rays finished with a record of 80–82, good for 4th in the AL East, 14 games behind the division champion New York Yankees. They missed the postseason for the first time since 2018 and finished with their first losing record since 2017.

Due to the damage to Tropicana Field after the season ended, this was the last season for the Rays at Tropicana Field until 2026.

== Season standings ==
=== American League East ===
AL East
Team	W	L	Pct.	GB	Home	Road
New York Yankees	94	68	.580	—	44‍–‍37	50‍–‍31
Baltimore Orioles	91	71	.562	3	44‍–‍37	47‍–‍34
Boston Red Sox	81	81	.500	13	38‍–‍43	43‍–‍38
Tampa Bay Rays	80	82	.494	14	42‍–‍39	38‍–‍43
Toronto Blue Jays	74	88	.457	20	39‍–‍42	35‍–‍46

=== American League Wild Card ===
Division leaders
Team	W	L	Pct.
New York Yankees	94	68	.580
Cleveland Guardians	92	69	.571
Houston Astros	88	73	.547

Wild Card teams (Top 3 teams qualify for postseason)
Team	W	L	Pct.	GB
Baltimore Orioles	91	71	.562	+5
Kansas City Royals	86	76	.531	—
Detroit Tigers	86	76	.531	—
Seattle Mariners	85	77	.525	1
Minnesota Twins	82	80	.506	4
Boston Red Sox	81	81	.500	5
Tampa Bay Rays	80	82	.494	6
Texas Rangers	78	84	.481	8
Toronto Blue Jays	74	88	.457	12
Oakland Athletics	69	93	.426	17
Los Angeles Angels	63	99	.389	23
Chicago White Sox	41	121	.253	45

=== Record vs. opponents ===
==== Record vs. American League ====
2024 American League record Source: MLB Standings Grid – 2024
Team	BAL	BOS	CWS	CLE	DET	HOU	KC	LAA	MIN	NYY	OAK	SEA	TB	TEX	TOR	NL
Baltimore	—	8–5	6–1	3–4	2–4	2–5	4–2	4–2	6–0	8–5	3–3	4–2	9–4	5–2	7–6	20–26
Boston	5–8	—	4–3	2–5	3–4	2–4	4–2	4–2	3–3	6–7	5–1	4–3	6–7	4–2	8–5	21–25
Chicago	1–6	3–4	—	5–8	3–10	2–4	1–12	4–2	1–12	1–5	3–3	1–6	4–2	0–7	1–5	11–35
Cleveland	4–3	5–2	8–5	—	7–6	1–4	5–8	5–1	10–3	2–4	6–1	4–2	3–4	4–2	4–2	24–22
Detroit	4–2	4–3	10–3	6–7	—	2–4	6–7	3–4	6–7	2–4	3–3	5–1	5–1	3–4	5–2	22–24
Houston	5–2	4–2	4–2	4–1	4–2	—	4–3	9–4	2–4	1–6	8–5	5–8	4–2	7–6	5–2	22–24
Kansas City	2–4	2–4	12–1	8–5	7–6	3–4	—	5–2	6–7	2–5	4–2	3–3	3–3	1–5	5–2	23–23
Los Angeles	2–4	2–4	2–4	1–5	4–3	4–9	2–5	—	1–5	3–3	5–8	8–5	3–4	4–9	0–7	22–24
Minnesota	0–6	3–3	12–1	3–10	7–6	4–2	7–6	5–1	—	0–6	6–1	5–2	3–4	5–2	4–2	18–28
New York	5–8	7–6	5–1	4–2	4–2	6–1	5–2	3–3	6–0	—	5–2	4–3	7–6	3–3	7–6	23–23
Oakland	3–3	1–5	3–3	1–6	3–3	5–8	2–4	8–5	1–6	2–5	—	4–9	3–4	6–7	3–3	24–22
Seattle	2–4	3–4	6–1	2–4	1–5	8–5	3–3	5–8	2–5	3–4	9–4	—	3–3	10–3	2–4	26–20
Tampa Bay	4–9	7–6	2–4	4–3	1–5	2–4	3–3	4–3	4–3	6–7	4–3	3–3	—	1–5	9–4	26–20
Texas	2–5	2–4	7–0	2–4	4–3	6–7	5–1	9–4	2–5	3–3	7–6	3–10	5–1	—	2–4	19–27
Toronto	6–7	5–8	5–1	2–4	2–5	2–5	2–5	7–0	2–4	6–7	3–3	4–2	4–9	4–2	—	20–26

Updated with the results of all games through September 30, 2024.

==== Record vs. National League ====
2024 American League record vs. National League Source: MLB Standings
Team	AZ	ATL	CHC	CIN	COL	LAD	MIA	MIL	NYM	PHI	PIT	SD	SF	STL	WSH
Baltimore	2–1	2–1	0–3	3–0	2–1	1–2	1–2	1–2	1–2	2–1	1–2	1–2	1–2	0–3	2–2
Boston	0–3	1–3	2–1	2–1	1–2	0–3	3–0	1–2	0–3	2–1	3–0	1–2	2–1	1–2	2–1
Chicago	1–2	2–1	0–4	0–3	2–1	0–3	1–2	0–3	0–3	0–3	0–3	0–3	1–2	2–1	2–1
Cleveland	0–3	1–2	3–0	3–1	1–2	1–2	2–1	0–3	3–0	2–1	2–1	1–2	2–1	1–2	2–1
Detroit	2–1	0–3	1–2	3–0	2–1	2–1	1–2	1–2	2–1	1–2	2–2	1–2	1–2	2–1	1–2
Houston	2–1	0–3	0–3	0–3	4–0	2–1	3–0	2–1	2–1	1–2	1–2	1–2	1–2	2–1	1–2
Kansas City	1–2	1–2	1–2	3–0	1–2	1–2	2–1	2–1	1–2	1–2	2–1	1–2	0–3	3–1	3–0
Los Angeles	1–2	1–2	1–2	0–3	1–2	2–2	3–0	1–2	2–1	1–2	2–1	3–0	2–1	1–2	1–2
Minnesota	2–1	0–3	1–2	1–2	2–1	1–2	1–2	1–3	1–2	2–1	1–2	1–2	1–2	1–2	2–1
New York	2–1	1–2	2–1	0–3	2–1	1–2	2–1	2–1	0–4	3–0	1–2	2–1	3–0	1–2	1–2
Oakland	1–2	1–2	2–1	2–1	2–1	1–2	2–1	1–2	2–1	2–1	3–0	0–3	2–2	1–2	2–1
Seattle	2–1	2–1	1–2	3–0	2–1	0–3	1–2	1–2	3–0	2–1	1–2	3–1	2–1	2–1	1–2
Tampa Bay	3–0	1–2	2–1	2–1	2–1	1–2	3–1	1–2	3–0	0–3	2–1	1–2	2–1	1–2	2–1
Texas	2–2	1–2	2–1	2–1	0–3	2–1	2–1	0–3	1–2	0–3	2–1	1–2	1–2	1–2	2–1
Toronto	1–2	1–2	1–2	1–2	2–1	1–2	0–3	1–2	1–2	1–3	2–1	2–1	2–1	3–0	1–2

Updated with the results of all games through September 30, 2024.

== Offseason ==
The Rays finished the 2023 season 99–63, good enough for second place in the AL East. They would be eliminated by the eventual World Series winning Texas Rangers in the 2023 American League Wild Card Series.

In a procedural move, shortstop Wander Franco was added back to the 40-man roster following the conclusion of the 2023 World Series following his stint on MLB's administrative leave.

=== Roster departures ===
On November 2, 2023, relief pitchers Chris Devenski, Jake Diekman, and Robert Stephenson elected free agency.

On November 4, 2023, the Rays placed Jalen Beeks, Christian Bethancourt, Josh Fleming, Tristan Gray, Raimel Tapia, and Cole Sulser on outright waivers.

== Game log ==
=== Regular season ===
Legend
	Rays win
	Rays loss
	Postponement
	Eliminated from playoff spot
**Bold**	Rays team member

2024 Game Log: 80–82 (Home: 42–39; Away: 38–43)
March/April: 14–17 (Home: 8–9; Away: 6–8)

#	Date	Opponent	Score	Win	Loss	Save	Attendance	Record	Streak
1	March 28	Blue Jays	2–8	Berríos (1–0)	**Eflin** (0–1)	—	25,025	0–1	L1
2	March 29	Blue Jays	8–2	**Civale** (1–0)	Bassitt (0–1)	—	18,653	1–1	W1
3	March 30	Blue Jays	5–1	**Littell** (1–0)	Kikuchi (0–1)	—	18,905	2–1	W2
4	March 31	Blue Jays	2–9	White (1–0)	**Armstrong** (0–1)	—	14,875	2–2	L1
5	April 1	Rangers	3–9	Dunning (1–0)	**Pepiot** (0–1)	—	14,144	2–3	L2
6	April 2	Rangers	5–2	**Eflin** (1–1)	Heaney (0–1)	—	11,697	3–3	W1
7	April 3	Rangers	1–4	Eovaldi (1–0)	**Civale** (1–1)	—	18,881	3–4	L1
8	April 5	@ Rockies	7–10	Beeks (1–0)	**Fairbanks** (0–1)	—	48,399	3–5	L2
9	April 6	@ Rockies	8–6	**Cleavinger** (1–0)	Beeks (1–1)	**Poche** (1)	29,238	4–5	W1
10	April 7	@ Rockies	3–2	**Pepiot** (1–1)	Hudson (0–2)	**Armstrong** (1)	25,566	5–5	W2
11	April 8	@ Angels	1–7	Anderson (2–0)	**Eflin** (1–2)	—	18,748	5–6	L1
12	April 9	@ Angels	6–4	**Civale** (2–1)	Sandoval (1–2)	**Fairbanks** (1)	20,271	6–6	W1
13	April 10	@ Angels	4–2	**Kelly** (1–0)	Soriano (0–2)	**Fairbanks** (2)	16,600	7–6	W2
14	April 12	Giants	2–1	**Cleavinger** (2–0)	Winn (0–3)	**Fairbanks** (3)	15,146	8–6	W3
15	April 13	Giants	2–11	Webb (1–1)	**Pepiot** (1–2)	—	17,411	8–7	L1
16	April 14	Giants	9–4	**Alexander** (1–0)	Snell (0–2)	—	19,470	9–7	W1
17	April 15	Angels	3–7	García (1–0)	**Maton** (0–1)	—	12,267	9–8	L1
18	April 16	Angels	7–6 (13)	**Cleavinger** (3–0)	Fulmer (0–1)	—	12,160	10–8	W1
19	April 17	Angels	4–5	Strickland (1–0)	**Fairbanks** (0–2)	—	10,844	10–9	L1
20	April 18	Angels	2–1	**Pepiot** (2–2)	Canning (0–3)	**Poche** (2)	10,648	11–9	W1
21	April 19	@ Yankees	3–5	Santana (1–0)	**Devenski** (0–1)	Holmes (8)	36,055	11–10	L1
22	April 20	@ Yankees	2–0 (10)	**Adam** (1–0)	Ferguson (0–3)	**Cleavinger** (1)	47,629	12–10	W1
23	April 21	@ Yankees	4–5	Gil (1–1)	**Civale** (2–2)	González (2)	40,022	12–11	L1
24	April 22	Tigers	1–7	Skubal (3–0)	**Littell** (1–1)	—	13,522	12–12	L2
25	April 23	Tigers	2–4	Faedo (1–1)	**Poche** (0–1)	Foley (7)	13,648	12–13	L3
26	April 24	Tigers	7–5	**Devenski** (1–1)	Vest (1–1)	**Cleavinger** (2)	13,754	13–13	W1
27	April 26	@ White Sox	4–9	Flexen (1–3)	**Eflin** (1–3)	—	10,323	13–14	L1
28	April 27	@ White Sox	7–8 (10)	García (1–2)	**Maton** (0–2)	—	28,009	13–15	L2
29	April 28	@ White Sox	2–4	Fedde (2–0)	**Littell** (1–2)	Leasure (1)	12,669	13–16	L3
30	April 29	@ Brewers	1–0	**Pepiot** (3–2)	Wilson (2–1)	**Adam** (1)	20,395	14–16	W1
31	April 30	@ Brewers	2–8	Peralta (3–0)	**Alexander** (1–1)	—	21,124	14–17	L1

May: 14–13 (Home: 9–9; Away: 5–4)

#	Date	Opponent	Score	Win	Loss	Save	Attendance	Record	Streak
32	May 1	@ Brewers	1–7	Rea (3–0)	**Eflin** (1–4)	—	20,132	14–18	L2
33	May 3	Mets	10–8	**Armstrong** (1–1)	Quintana (1–3)	**Adam** (2)	19,077	15–18	W1
34	May 4	Mets	3–1	**Adam** (2–0)	Ottavino (1–1)	**Maton** (1)	18,968	16–18	W2
35	May 5	Mets	7–6 (10)	**Ramírez** (1–0)	Diekman (1–1)	—	19,310	17–18	W3
36	May 6	White Sox	8–2	**Ramírez** (2–0)	Clevinger (0–1)	—	12,042	18–18	W4
37	May 7	White Sox	5–1	**Eflin** (2–4)	Soroka (0–4)	—	10,872	19–18	W5
38	May 8	White Sox	1–4	Flexen (2–3)	**Civale** (2–3)	Kopech (3)	12,877	19–19	L1
39	May 10	Yankees	0–2	Schmidt (4–1)	**Bradley** (0–1)	Holmes (12)	18,041	19–20	L2
40	May 11	Yankees	7–2	**Littell** (2–2)	Cortés Jr. (1–4)	—	21,308	20–20	W1
41	May 12	Yankees	6–10	Gil (4–1)	**Alexander** (1–2)	—	20,694	20–21	L1
42	May 13	@ Red Sox	5–3	**Eflin** (3–4)	Crawford (2–2)	**Adam** (3)	28,663	21–21	W1
43	May 14	@ Red Sox	4–5 (12)	Bernardino (2–1)	**Rodríguez** (0–1)	—	32,892	21–22	L1
44	May 15	@ Red Sox	4–3	**Bradley** (1–1)	Houck (3–5)	**Kelly** (1)	30,016	22–22	W1
45	May 16	@ Red Sox	7–5	**Rodríguez** (1–1)	Jansen (1–1)	**Ramírez** (1)	31,704	23–22	W2
46	May 17	@ Blue Jays	4–3	**Alexander** (2–2)	Bassitt (3–6)	**Fairbanks** (4)	32,640	24–22	W3
47	May 18	@ Blue Jays	5–4	**Ramírez** (3–0)	Pearson (0–1)	**Cleavinger** (3)	34,416	25–22	W4
48	May 19	@ Blue Jays	2–5	Manoah (1–1)	**Civale** (2–4)	Romano (7)	35,840	25–23	L1
49	May 20	Red Sox	0–5	Houck (4–5)	**Bradley** (1–2)	—	13,489	25–24	L2
50	May 21	Red Sox	2–5	Weissert (2–1)	**Adam** (2–1)	Jansen (8)	12,274	25–25	L3
51	May 22	Red Sox	5–8	Bello (5–2)	**Lovelady** (0–2)	—	13,095	25–26	L4
52	May 24	Royals	1–8	Lugo (8–1)	**Alexander** (2–3)	—	16,368	25–27	L5
53	May 25	Royals	4–7 (11)	McArthur (2–2)	**Lovelady** (0–3)	Anderson (1)	20,309	25–28	L6
54	May 26	Royals	4–1	**Cleavinger** (4–0)	Wacha (4–5)	**Fairbanks** (5)	20,789	26–28	W1
55	May 28	Athletics	0–3	Spence (4–2)	**Littell** (2–3)	Miller (11)	13,889	26–29	L1
56	May 29	Athletics	4–3	**Fairbanks** (1–2)	Kelly (2–2)	—	13,167	27–29	W1
57	May 30	Athletics	6–5 (12)	**Lovelady** (1–3)	Ferguson (0–1)	—	15,264	28–29	W2
58	May 31	@ Orioles	1–3	Pérez (1–0)	**Lovelady** (1–4)	Kimbrel (13)	27,364	28–30	L1

June: 14–12 (Home: 6–7; Away: 8–5)

#	Date	Opponent	Score	Win	Loss	Save	Attendance	Record	Streak
59	June 1	@ Orioles	5–9	Webb (1–3)	**Bradley** (1–3)	—	36,958	28–31	L2
60	June 2	@ Orioles	4–3	**Armstrong** (2–1)	Tate (2–1)	**Fairbanks** (6)	32,463	29–31	W1
61	June 4	@ Marlins	9–5	**Pepiot** (4–2)	Luzardo (2–5)	**Fairbanks** (7)	9,234	30–31	W2
62	June 5	@ Marlins	5–3	**Lovelady** (2–4)	Garrett (2–1)	**Fairbanks** (8)	8,778	31–31	W3
63	June 7	Orioles	3–6	Irvin (6–2)	**Civale** (2–5)	Kimbrel (14)	17,882	31–32	L1
64	June 8	Orioles	0–5	Bradish (2–0)	**Bradley** (1–4)	—	20,485	31–33	L2
65	June 9	Orioles	2–9	Rodriguez (7–2)	**Littell** (2–4)	—	20,386	31–34	L3
66	June 10	Orioles	2–5	Burnes (7–2)	**Pepiot** (4–3)	Kimbrel (15)	14,686	31–35	L4
67	June 11	Cubs	5–2	**Devenski** (2–1)	Neris (6–1)	—	15,192	32–35	W1
68	June 12	Cubs	3–4	Miller (1–0)	**Cleavinger** (4–1)	Neris (10)	16,927	32–36	L1
69	June 13	Cubs	3–2	**Bradley** (2–4)	Leiter Jr. (2–4)	**Fairbanks** (9)	19,679	33–36	W1
70	June 14	@ Braves	3–7	Sale (9–2)	**Littell** (2–5)	Iglesias (18)	41,046	33–37	L1
71	June 15	@ Braves	2–9	Morton (4–3)	**Pepiot** (4–4)	—	40,480	33–38	L2
72	June 16	@ Braves	8–6	**Adam** (3–1)	Iglesias (0–1)	**Fairbanks** (10)	40,211	34–38	W1
73	June 18	@ Twins	6–7	Durán (3–2)	**Fairbanks** (1–3)	—	17,342	34–39	L1
74	June 19	@ Twins	3–2 (10)	**Adam** (4–1)	Alcalá (1–2)	**Maton** (2)	20,712	35–39	W1
75	June 20	@ Twins	7–6 (10)	**Fairbanks** (2–3)	Jax (3–3)	—	24,863	36–39	W2
76	June 21	@ Pirates	10–3	**Poche** (1–1)	Mlodzinski (1–3)	—	26,600	37–39	W3
77	June 22	@ Pirates	3–4	Jones (5–6)	**Eflin** (3–5)	Chapman (2)	33,040	37–40	L1
78	June 23	@ Pirates	3–1	**Kelly** (2–0)	Holderman (3–1)	**Fairbanks** (11)	29,026	38–40	W1
79	June 24	Mariners	4–3	**Maton** (1–2)	Voth (2–2)	**Fairbanks** (12)	14,482	39–40	W2
80	June 25	Mariners	11–3	**Cleavinger** (5–1)	Castillo (6–9)	—	14,034	40–40	W3
81	June 26	Mariners	2–5	Kirby (7–5)	**Armstrong** (2–2)	Thornton (1)	18,286	40–41	L1
82	June 28	Nationals	3–1	**Eflin** (4–5)	Parker (5–4)	**Fairbanks** (13)	14,959	41–41	W1
83	June 29	Nationals	1–8	Irvin (6–6)	**Civale** (2–6)	—	17,501	41–42	L1
84	June 30	Nationals	5–0	**Bradley** (3–4)	Corbin (1–8)	—	18,259	42–42	W1

July: 13–11 (Home: 7–4; Away: 6–7)

#	Date	Opponent	Score	Win	Loss	Save	Attendance	Record	Streak
85	July 2	@ Royals	5–1	**Littell** (3–5)	Singer (4–5)	—	16,865	43–42	W2
86	July 3	@ Royals	2–4	Wacha (5–6)	**Pepiot** (4–5)	McArthur (15)	23,268	43–43	L1
87	July 4	@ Royals	10–8	**Eflin** (5–5)	Marsh (6–6)	**Fairbanks** (14)	28,358	44–43	W1
88	July 5	@ Rangers	0–3	Lorenzen (5–4)	**Baz** (0–1)	Yates (12)	32,175	44–44	L1
89	July 6	@ Rangers	3–4	Hernández (2–0)	**Kelly** (2–1)	Yates (13)	31,560	44–45	L2
90	July 7	@ Rangers	2–13	Eovaldi (6–3)	**Littell** (3–6)	—	32,113	44–46	L3
91	July 9	Yankees	5–3	**Pepiot** (5–5)	Rodón (9–7)	**Fairbanks** (15)	20,436	45–46	W1
92	July 10	Yankees	1–2	Hill (3–0)	**Eflin** (5–6)	Holmes (20)	19,246	45–47	L1
93	July 11	Yankees	5–4	**Kelly** (3–1)	Cortés Jr. (4–8)	**Fairbanks** (16)	23,438	46–47	W1
94	July 12	Guardians	2–0	**Bradley** (4–4)	Carrasco (3–7)	**Adam** (4)	17,290	47–47	W2
95	July 13	Guardians	2–4	Sandlin (6–0)	**Cleavinger** (5–2)	Clase (29)	19,946	47–48	L1
96	July 14	Guardians	2–0	**Pepiot** (6–5)	Lively (8–5)	**Fairbanks** (17)	21,875	48–48	W1
–	July 16	**94th All-Star Game in Arlington, TX**							
97	July 19	@ Yankees	1–6	Cole (3–1)	**Eflin** (5–7)	—	47,036	48–49	L1
98	July 20	@ Yankees	9–1	**Bradley** (5–4)	Cortés Jr. (4–9)	—	43,173	49–49	W1
99	July 21	@ Yankees	6–4	**Cleavinger** (6–2)	Stroman (7–5)	**Fairbanks** (18)	45,178	50–49	W2
100	July 22	@ Yankees	1–6	Rodón (10–7)	**Littell** (3–7)	—	40,824	50–50	L1
101	July 23	@ Blue Jays	4–2	**Alexander** (3–3)	Berríos (8–8)	**Fairbanks** (19)	38,575	51–50	W1
102	July 24	@ Blue Jays	3–6	Cabrera (3–2)	**Adam** (4–2)	—	32,276	51–51	L1
103	July 25	@ Blue Jays	13–0	**Bradley** (6–4)	Bassitt (8–9)	—	41,148	52–51	W1
104	July 26	Reds	2–3 (10)	Martinez (4–5)	**Rodríguez** (1–2)	Díaz (20)	20,441	52–52	L1
105	July 27	Reds	4–0	**Littell** (4–7)	Abbott (9–7)	—	23,464	53–52	W1
106	July 28	Reds	2–1	**Cleavinger** (7–2)	Cruz (3–8)	**Fairbanks** (20)	19,873	54–52	W2
107	July 30	Marlins	9–3	**Alexander** (4–3)	Cronin (2–3)	—	17,931	55–52	W3
108	July 31	Marlins	2–6	Muñoz (2–5)	**Bradley** (6–5)	—	14,484	55–53	L1

August: 12–15 (Home: 5–6; Away: 7–9)

#	Date	Opponent	Score	Win	Loss	Save	Attendance	Record	Streak
109	August 2	@ Astros	2–3	Abreu (2–1)	**Kelly** (3–2)	Hader (22)	33,430	55–54	L2
110	August 3	@ Astros	6–1	**Littell** (5–7)	Blanco (9–6)	—	37,328	56–54	W1
111	August 4	@ Astros	1–0	**Alexander** (5–3)	Arrighetti (4–10)	**Fairbanks** (21)	35,205	57–54	W2
112	August 6	@ Cardinals	3–4	Gray (11–6)	**Springs** (0–1)	Helsley (35)	32,922	57–55	L1
113	August 7	@ Cardinals	2–5	Fedde (8–5)	**Bradley** (6–6)	Helsley (36)	31,401	57–56	L2
114	August 8	@ Cardinals	6–4	**Lovelady** (3–4)	Romero (5–2)	**Fairbanks** (22)	35,217	58–56	W1
115	August 9	Orioles	1–4	Eflin (8–7)	**Littell** (5–8)	—	20,673	58–57	L1
116	August 10	Orioles	5–7	Smith (4–0)	**Poche** (1–2)	Domínguez (2)	23,898	58–58	L2
117	August 11	Orioles	2–1	**Rodríguez** (2–2)	Kimbrel (6–4)	**Fairbanks** (23)	16,848	59–58	W1
118	August 12	Astros	1–6	Valdez (12–5)	**Bradley** (6–7)	—	10,540	59–59	L1
119	August 13	Astros	2–3	Kikuchi (6–9)	**Baz** (0–2)	Hader (26)	12,275	59–60	L2
120	August 14	Astros	1–2 (10)	Hader (5–6)	**Cleavinger** (7–3)	—	12,493	59–61	L3
121	August 16	Diamondbacks	5–4	**Fairbanks** (3–3)	Martínez (5–3)	—	21,613	60–61	W1
122	August 17	Diamondbacks	6–1	**Springs** (1–1)	Gallen (9–6)	**Lovelady** (1)	17,708	61–61	W2
123	August 18	Diamondbacks	8–7 (12)	**Uceta** (1–0)	Martínez (5–4)	—	18,636	62–61	W3
124	August 19	@ Athletics	0–3	Boyle (3–5)	**Bradley** (6–8)	Miller (19)	3,938	62–62	L1
125	August 20	@ Athletics	1–0	**Baz** (1–2)	Estes (5–6)	**Uceta** (1)	4,377	63–62	W1
126	August 21	@ Athletics	4–2	**Pepiot** (7–5)	Spence (7–9)	**Rodríguez** (1)	10,339	64–62	W2
127	August 22	@ Athletics	1–3	Bido (5–3)	**Springs** (1–2)	Miller (20)	5,142	64–63	L1
128	August 23	@ Dodgers	3–7	Kopech (4–8)	**Rodríguez** (2–3)	—	45,556	64–64	L2
129	August 24	@ Dodgers	9–8 (10)	**Rodríguez** (3–3)	Kelly (1–1)	**Cleavinger** (4)	48,488	65–64	W1
130	August 25	@ Dodgers	1–3	Treinen (6–3)	**Lovelady** (3–5)	Banda (2)	52,464	65–65	L1
131	August 26	@ Mariners	1–5	Miller (10–7)	**Pepiot** (7–6)	—	29,755	65–66	L2
132	August 27	@ Mariners	3–2	**Uceta** (2–0)	Chargois (2–1)	**Rodríguez** (2)	26,153	66–66	W1
133	August 28	@ Mariners	2–6	Castillo (11–12)	**Alexander** (5–4)	—	35,131	66–67	L1
134	August 30	Padres	5–13	Pérez (4–5)	**Bradley** (6–9)	—	17,547	66–68	L2
135	August 31	Padres	11–4	**Baz** (2–2)	Vásquez (4–7)	—	16,600	67–68	W1

September: 13–14 (Home: 7–4; Away: 6–10)

#	Date	Opponent	Score	Win	Loss	Save	Attendance	Record	Streak
136	September 1	Padres	3–4	Scott (9–5)	**Rodríguez** (3–4)	Suárez (30)	17,494	67–69	L1
137	September 2	Twins	4–5	Alcalá (4–3)	**Littell** (5–9)	Durán (21)	11,636	67–70	L2
138	September 3	Twins	2–1	**Springs** (2–2)	Festa (2–5)	**Cleavinger** (5)	10,531	68–70	W1
139	September 4	Twins	9–4	**Alexander** (6–4)	Varland (0–6)	—	11,513	69–70	W2
140	September 5	Twins	3–4	López (14–8)	**Bradley** (6–10)	Durán (22)	10,584	69–71	L1
141	September 6	@ Orioles	0–2	Kremer (7–9)	**Baz** (2–3)	Domínguez (9)	25,439	69–72	L2
142	September 7	@ Orioles	7–1	**Pepiot** (8–6)	Eflin (10–8)	—	34,256	70–72	W1
143	September 8	@ Orioles	2–0	**Littell** (6–9)	Burnes (13–8)	**Uceta** (2)	29,519	71–72	W2
144	September 9	@ Phillies	1–2	Estévez (4–4)	**Cleavinger** (7–4)	—	39,511	71–73	L1
145	September 10	@ Phillies	4–9	Alvarado (2–5)	**Lovelady** (3–6)	—	40,088	71–74	L2
146	September 11	@ Phillies	2–3	Wheeler (15–6)	**Rasmussen** (0–1)	Estévez (25)	40,715	71–75	L3
147	September 12	@ Guardians	5–2	**Sulser** (1–0)	Williams (3–9)	**Lovelady** (2)	19,188	72–75	W1
148	September 13	@ Guardians	3–1	**Littell** (7–9)	Bibee (11–8)	**Uceta** (3)	24,160	73–75	W2
149	September 14	@ Guardians	1–6	Cantillo (2–3)	**Alexander** (6–5)	—	31,362	73–76	L1
150	September 15	@ Guardians	0–2	Lively (12–9)	**Bradley** (6–11)	Clase (45)	21,144	73–77	L2
151	September 17	Red Sox	8–3	**Baz** (3–3)	Pivetta (5–11)	—	12,169	74–77	W1
152	September 18	Red Sox	1–2	Slaten (6–2)	**Rasmussen** (0–2)	Jansen (27)	12,153	74–78	L1
153	September 19	Red Sox	2–0	**Littell** (8–9)	Bello (14–8)	**Cleavinger** (6)	13,120	75–78	W1
154	September 20	Blue Jays	1–0	**Kelly** (4–2)	Berríos (16–10)	**Bigge** (1)	14,372	76–78	W2
155	September 21	Blue Jays	3–2	**Bradley** (7–11)	Rodríguez (1–7)	**Rasmussen** (1)	20,704	77–78	W3
156	September 22	Blue Jays	4–3	**Kelly** (5–2)	Cabrera (3–3)	**Uceta** (4)	20,567	78–78	W4
157	September 24	@ Tigers	1–2	Skubal (18–4)	**Pepiot** (8–7)	Brieske (1)	22,770	78–79	L1
158	September 25	@ Tigers	1–7	Guenther (3–0)	**Littell** (8–10)	—	32,463	78–80	L2
159	September 26	@ Tigers	3–4	Brieske (4–4)	**Cleavinger** (7–5)	Foley (27)	27,867	78–81	L3
160	September 27	@ Red Sox	2–1	**Bradley** (8–11)	Pivetta (6–12)	**Uceta** (5)	33,694	79–81	W1
161	September 28	@ Red Sox	7–2	**Baz** (4–3)	Crawford (9–16)	—	35,333	80–81	W2
162	September 29	@ Red Sox	1–3	Priester (3–6)	**Pepiot** (8–8)	Slaten (2)	34,862	80–82	L1

== Roster ==
2024 Tampa Bay Rays
Roster
Pitchers: 47 Jason Adam; 14 Tyler Alexander; 64 Shawn Armstrong; 11 Shane Baz; 43 Hunter Bigge; 45 Taj Bradley; 34 Aaron Civale; 60 Garrett Cleavinger; 48 Chris Devenski; 24 Zach Eflin; 29 Peter Fairbanks; 49 Kevin Kelly; 67 Joel Kuhnel; 52 Zack Littell; 74 Jacob Lopez; 55 Richard Lovelady; 88 Phil Maton; 48 Mason Montgomery; 44 Ryan Pepiot; 38 Colin Poche; 61 Erasmo Ramírez; 57 Drew Rasmussen; 39 Manuel Rodríguez; 59 Jeffrey Springs; 65 Justin Sterner; 71 Cole Sulser; 63 Edwin Uceta; 40 Jacob Waguespack; 53 Tyler Zuber	Catchers: 19 Rob Brantly; 41 Logan Driscoll; 28 Alex Jackson; 50 René Pinto; 30 Ben Rortvedt; Infielders: 62 Jonathan Aranda; 7 José Caballero; 13 Junior Caminero; 2 Yandy Díaz; 8 Brandon Lowe; 25 Curtis Mead; 24 Christopher Morel; 17 Isaac Paredes; 10 Amed Rosario; 54 Austin Shenton; 6 Taylor Walls	Outfielders: 56 Randy Arozarena; 10 Dylan Carlson; 21 Jonny DeLuca; 0 Niko Goodrum; 15 Josh Lowe; 26 Kameron Misner; 1 Richie Palacios; 43 Harold Ramírez; 22 José Siri	Manager: 16 Kevin Cash; Coaches: 99 Misha Dworken (staff assistant); 97 Jonathan Erlichman (analytics coach); 46 Tomas Francisco (field coordinator); 9 Michael Johns (first base); 52 Rick Knapp (assistant pitching); 27 Rodney Linares (bench); 33 Jorge Moncada (bullpen); 51 Chad Mottola (hitting); 35 Brady North (assistant hitting); 23 Kyle Snyder (pitching); 4 Brady Williams (third base)

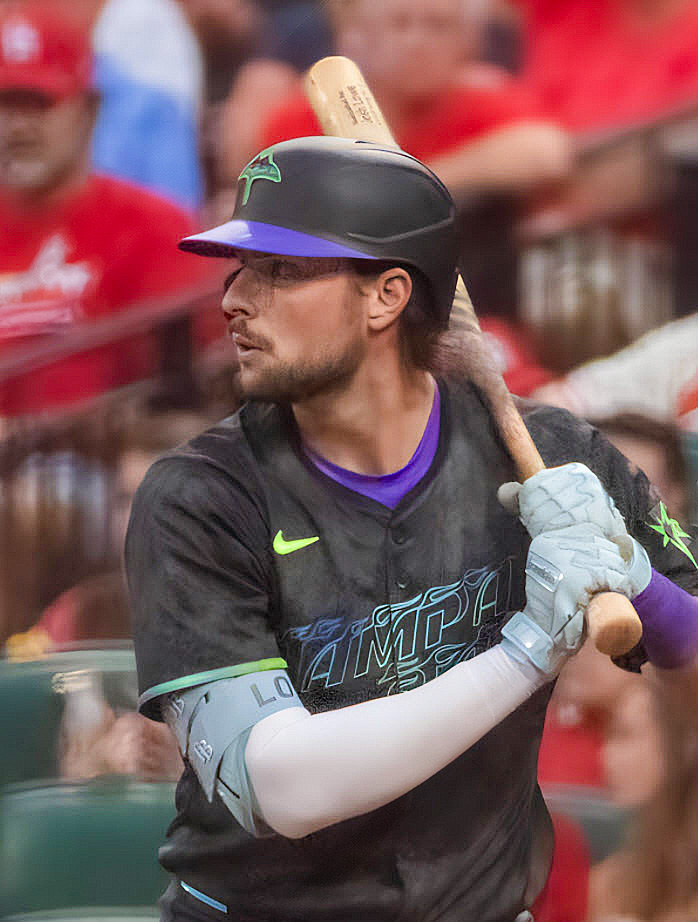
Josh Lowe

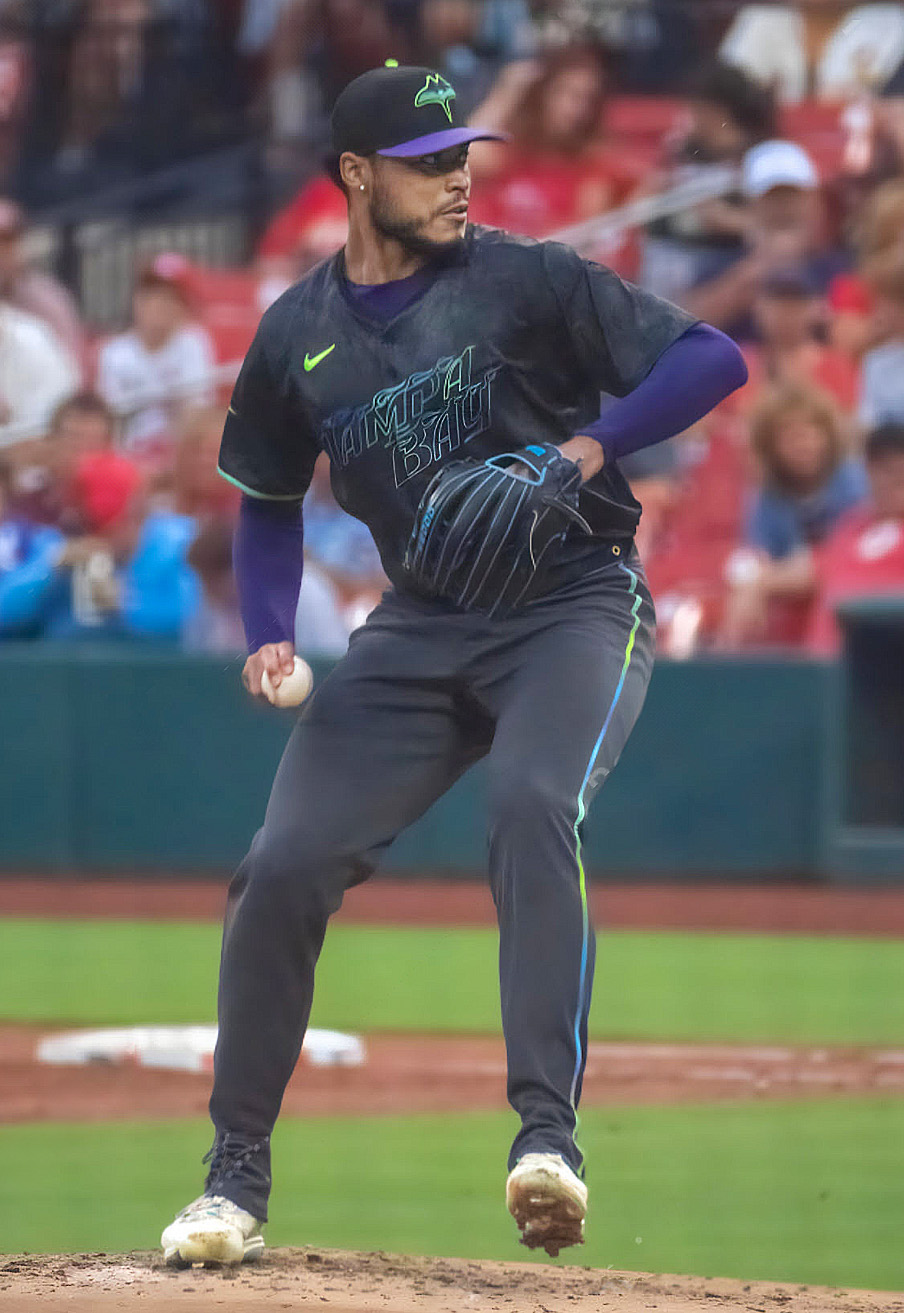
Taj Bradley.

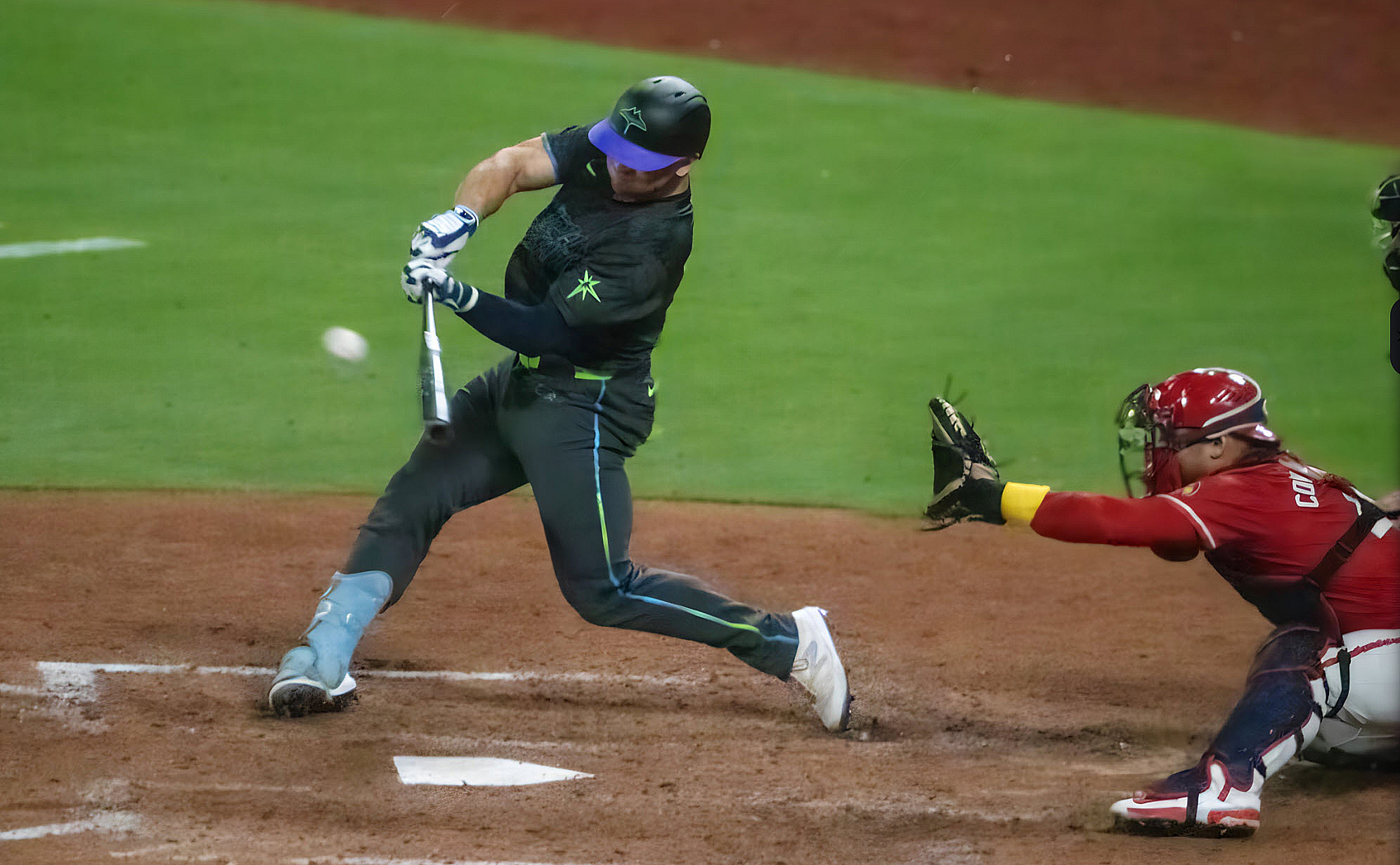
Ben Rortvedt

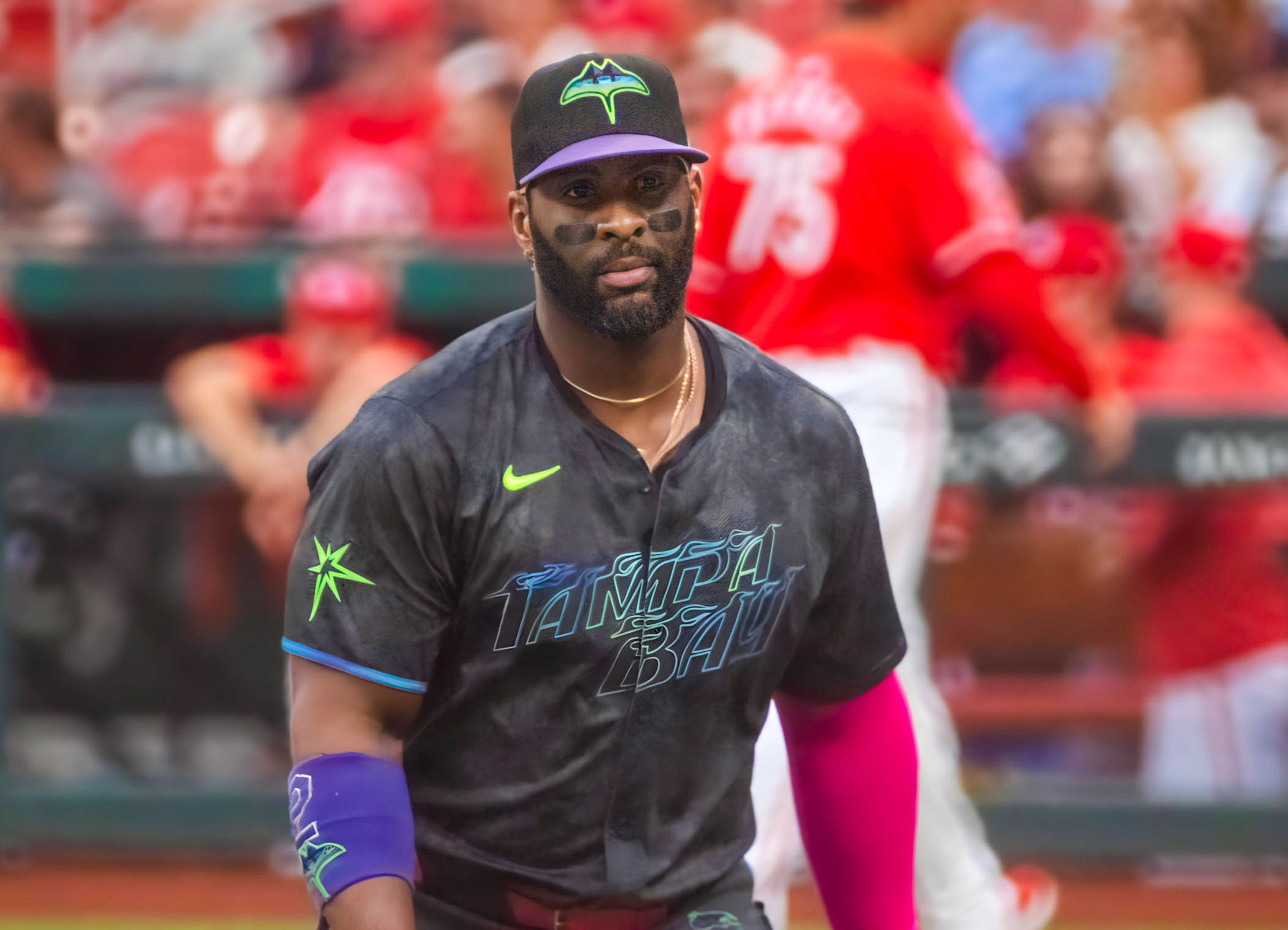
Yandy Díaz

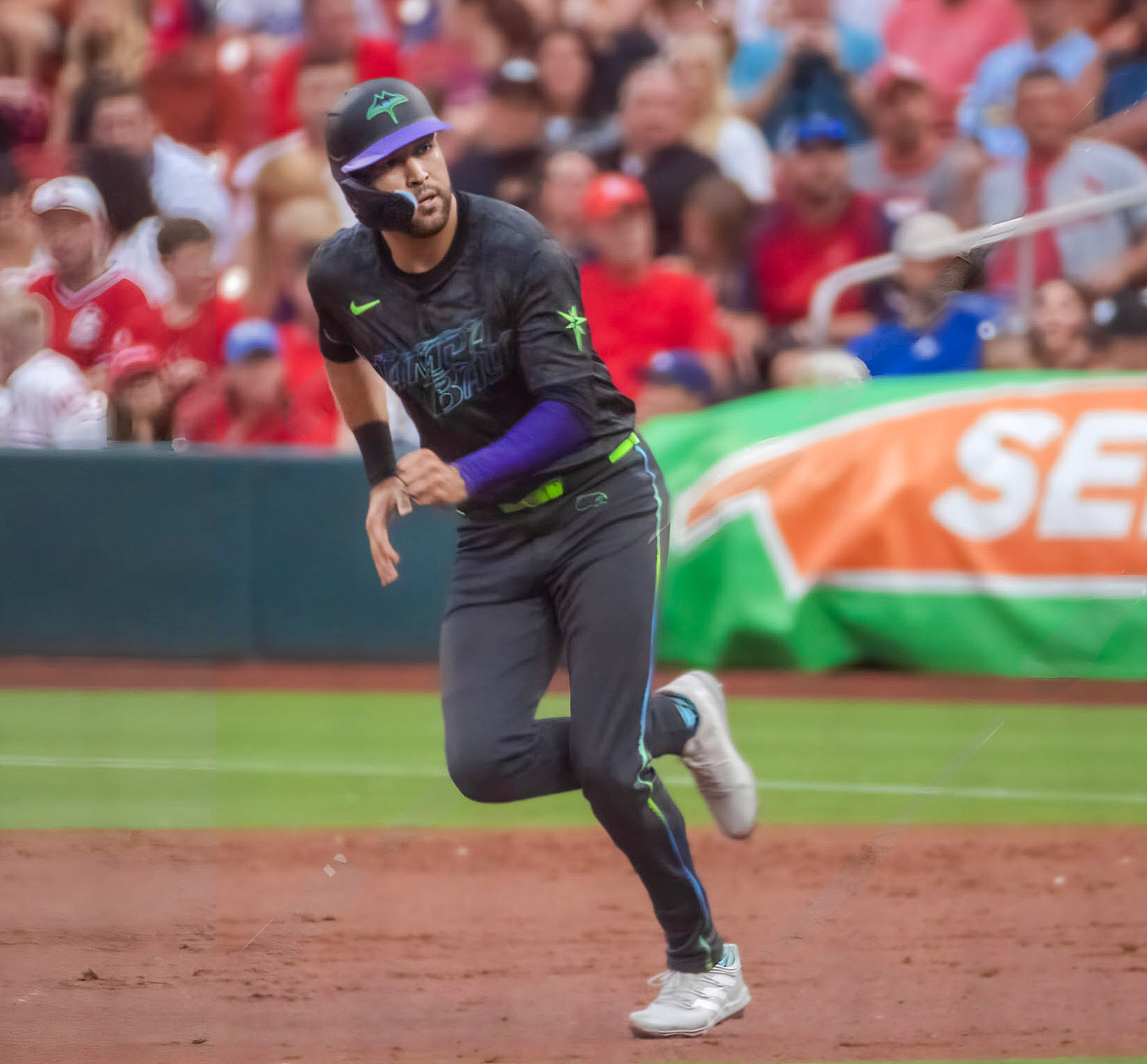
Dylan Carlson

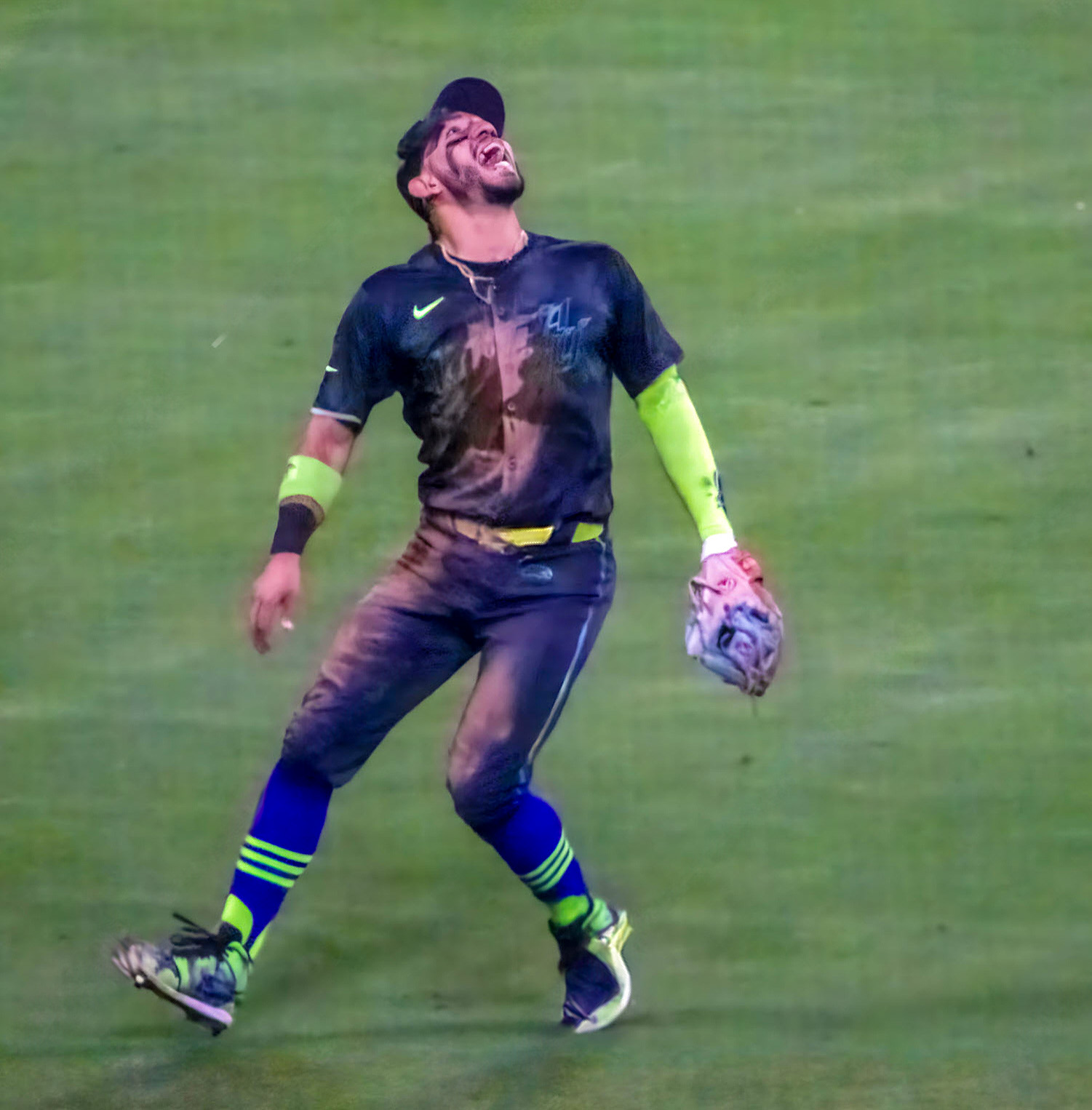
José Caballero

== Player stats ==
= Indicates team leader

= Indicates league leader

=== Batting ===
Note: G = Games played; AB = At bats; R = Runs scored; H = Hits; 2B = Doubles; 3B = Triples; HR = Home runs; RBI = Runs batted in; SB = Stolen bases; BB = Walks; AVG = Batting average; SLG = Slugging average

Player	G	AB	R	H	2B	3B	HR	RBI	SB	BB	AVG	SLG
Yandy Díaz	145	563	55	158	31	1	14	65	0	50	.281	.414
José Caballero	139	441	53	100	24	1	9	44	44	27	.227	.347
Jose Siri	130	402	50	75	16	1	18	47	14	31	.187	.366
Brandon Lowe	107	385	56	94	19	3	21	58	5	33	.244	.473
Isaac Paredes	101	363	41	89	19	1	16	55	0	52	.245	.435
Josh Lowe	106	353	37	85	19	2	10	34	25	32	.241	.391
Randy Arozarena	100	350	45	74	19	0	15	37	16	45	.211	.394
Jonny DeLuca	107	332	29	72	12	4	6	31	16	24	.217	.331
Ben Rortvedt	112	290	27	66	13	0	3	31	1	34	.228	.303
Richie Palacios	92	264	46	59	8	1	5	21	19	45	.223	.318
Amed Rosario	76	264	22	81	17	3	2	26	9	7	.307	.417
Taylor Walls	84	218	27	40	5	3	1	14	16	31	.183	.248
Christopher Morel	49	173	13	33	4	2	3	9	1	14	.191	.289
Junior Caminero	43	165	15	41	9	1	6	18	2	11	.248	.424
Harold Ramírez	48	164	21	44	3	0	1	13	5	3	.268	.305
Alex Jackson	58	139	17	17	7	0	3	12	1	12	.122	.237
Jonathan Aranda	44	128	22	30	7	0	6	14	0	12	.234	.430
Curtis Mead	38	122	10	29	3	0	1	7	2	6	.238	.287
Dylan Carlson	37	114	7	25	2	0	3	14	2	10	.219	.316
Austin Shenton	19	42	3	9	5	0	1	3	0	8	.214	.405
René Pinto	19	42	5	9	3	0	2	6	0	4	.214	.429
Logan Driscoll	15	35	2	6	0	0	1	5	0	1	.171	.257
Niko Goodrum	9	16	1	3	0	0	0	0	0	1	.188	.188
Kameron Misner	8	15	0	1	0	0	0	0	0	0	.067	.067
Rob Brantley	3	9	0	1	0	0	0	0	0	0	.111	.111
Team totals	162	5389	604	1241	245	23	147	564	178	493	.230	.366

Source:Baseball Reference

=== Pitching ===
Note: W = Wins; L = Losses; ERA = Earned run average; G = Games pitched; GS = Games started; SV = Saves; IP = Innings pitched; H = Hits allowed; R = Runs allowed; ER = Earned runs allowed; BB = Walks allowed; SO = Strikeouts

Player	W	L	ERA	G	GS	SV	IP	H	R	ER	BB	SO
Zack Littell	8	10	3.63	29	29	0	156.1	164	68	63	31	141
Taj Bradley	8	11	4.11	25	25	0	138.0	122	68	63	47	154
Ryan Pepiot	8	8	3.60	26	26	0	130.0	102	58	52	48	142
Zach Eflin	5	7	4.09	19	19	0	110.0	115	55	50	13	87
Tyler Alexander	6	5	5.10	23	9	0	107.2	110	61	61	24	90
Aaron Civale	2	6	5.07	17	17	0	87.0	93	51	49	27	84
Shane Baz	4	3	3.06	14	14	0	79.1	57	28	27	27	69
Kevin Kelly	5	2	2.67	68	0	1	70.2	59	25	21	9	63
Garrett Cleavinger	7	5	3.75	68	0	6	60.0	52	29	25	31	71
Jason Adam	4	2	2.49	47	0	4	47.0	26	17	13	16	50
Shawn Armstrong	2	2	5.40	38	7	1	46.2	56	30	28	19	50
Pete Fairbanks	3	3	3.57	46	0	23	45.1	36	20	18	17	44
Edwin Uceta	2	0	1.51	30	0	5	41.2	26	8	7	8	57
Manuel Rodríguez	3	4	2.15	40	0	2	37.2	29	13	9	11	34
Colin Poche	1	2	3.86	43	0	2	37.1	30	16	16	13	33
Phil Maton	1	2	4.58	40	0	2	35.1	29	19	18	18	30
Jeffrey Springs	2	2	3.27	7	7	0	33.0	34	12	12	11	37
Richard Lovelady	3	5	3.77	28	0	2	28.2	25	13	12	9	20
Drew Rasmussen	0	2	2.83	16	4	1	28.2	25	10	9	6	35
Chris Devenski	2	1	6.75	19	0	0	26.2	28	25	20	14	24
Erasmo Ramírez	3	0	4.35	13	0	1	20.2	12	12	10	10	15
Hunter Bigge	0	0	2.57	15	1	1	14.0	14	4	4	3	19
Cole Sulser	1	0	0.00	6	2	0	11.2	3	0	0	6	8
Jacob Lopez	0	0	5.23	4	1	0	10.1	5	7	6	7	8
Jacob Waguespack	0	0	5.40	4	1	0	10.0	13	7	6	10	11
Mason Montgomery	0	0	1.86	9	0	0	9.2	6	2	2	5	17
Joel Kuhnel	0	0	1.13	5	0	0	8.0	4	1	1	0	4
Justin Sterner	0	0	2.25	2	0	0	4.0	5	2	1	1	4
Tyler Zuber	0	0	2.70	2	0	0	3.1	3	1	1	2	4
Ben Rortvedt	0	0	4.50	1	0	0	2.0	3	1	1	2	1
Team totals	80	82	3.77	162	162	51	1440.2	1286	663	604	445	1406

Source:Baseball Reference

Note: No Earned run average (ERA) qualifiers, 162 Innings pitched required, 1 inning per scheduled game.

== Farm system ==
Level	Team	League	Manager
AAA	Durham Bulls	International League	
AA	Montgomery Biscuits	Southern League	
High-A	Bowling Green Hot Rods	South Atlantic League	
A	Charleston RiverDogs	Carolina League	
Rookie	FCL Rays	Florida Complex League	
Foreign Rookie	DSL Rays 1	Dominican Summer League	
Foreign Rookie	DSL Rays 2	Dominican Summer League	
