= 2024 Minnesota Twins season =

2024 Minnesota Twins
- League: American League
- Division: Central
- Ballpark: Target Field
- City: Minneapolis, Minnesota
- Record: 82–80 (.506)
- Divisional place: 4th
- Owner: Jim Pohlad
- President: Dave St. Peter
- President, Baseball Operations: Derek Falvey
- General manager: Thad Levine
- Manager: Rocco Baldelli
- Television: Bally Sports North
- Radio: WCCO
- Stats: ESPN.com; Baseball Reference

The 2024 Minnesota Twins season was the 64th season for the Minnesota Twins franchise in the Twin Cities of Minnesota, their 15th season at Target Field, and the 124th overall in the American League. They entered the season as the defending American League Central champions. Despite having a 95% chance of making the playoffs as late as September 2, they suffered a late season collapse, going 8–18 in their last 26 games, which resulted in them failing to improve on their 87–75 record from 2023. On September 27, they were officially eliminated from postseason contention.

== Offseason ==
In February, the Twins signed Carlos Santana to a one-year, $5.25 million contract, and signed Jay Jackson to a one–year, $1.5 million contract.

== Season standings ==
=== American League Central ===
AL Central
Team	W	L	Pct.	GB	Home	Road
Cleveland Guardians	92	69	.571	—	50‍–‍30	42‍–‍39
Kansas City Royals	86	76	.531	6½	45‍–‍36	41‍–‍40
Detroit Tigers	86	76	.531	6½	43‍–‍38	43‍–‍38
Minnesota Twins	82	80	.506	10½	43‍–‍38	39‍–‍42
Chicago White Sox	41	121	.253	51½	23‍–‍58	18‍–‍63

=== American League Wild Card ===
Division leaders
Team	W	L	Pct.
New York Yankees	94	68	.580
Cleveland Guardians	92	69	.571
Houston Astros	88	73	.547

Wild Card teams (Top 3 teams qualify for postseason)
Team	W	L	Pct.	GB
Baltimore Orioles	91	71	.562	+5
Kansas City Royals	86	76	.531	—
Detroit Tigers	86	76	.531	—
Seattle Mariners	85	77	.525	1
Minnesota Twins	82	80	.506	4
Boston Red Sox	81	81	.500	5
Tampa Bay Rays	80	82	.494	6
Texas Rangers	78	84	.481	8
Toronto Blue Jays	74	88	.457	12
Oakland Athletics	69	93	.426	17
Los Angeles Angels	63	99	.389	23
Chicago White Sox	41	121	.253	45

=== Record vs. opponents ===
==== Record vs. American League ====
2024 American League record Source: MLB Standings Grid – 2024
Team	BAL	BOS	CWS	CLE	DET	HOU	KC	LAA	MIN	NYY	OAK	SEA	TB	TEX	TOR	NL
Baltimore	—	8–5	6–1	3–4	2–4	2–5	4–2	4–2	6–0	8–5	3–3	4–2	9–4	5–2	7–6	20–26
Boston	5–8	—	4–3	2–5	3–4	2–4	4–2	4–2	3–3	6–7	5–1	4–3	6–7	4–2	8–5	21–25
Chicago	1–6	3–4	—	5–8	3–10	2–4	1–12	4–2	1–12	1–5	3–3	1–6	4–2	0–7	1–5	11–35
Cleveland	4–3	5–2	8–5	—	7–6	1–4	5–8	5–1	10–3	2–4	6–1	4–2	3–4	4–2	4–2	24–22
Detroit	4–2	4–3	10–3	6–7	—	2–4	6–7	3–4	6–7	2–4	3–3	5–1	5–1	3–4	5–2	22–24
Houston	5–2	4–2	4–2	4–1	4–2	—	4–3	9–4	2–4	1–6	8–5	5–8	4–2	7–6	5–2	22–24
Kansas City	2–4	2–4	12–1	8–5	7–6	3–4	—	5–2	6–7	2–5	4–2	3–3	3–3	1–5	5–2	23–23
Los Angeles	2–4	2–4	2–4	1–5	4–3	4–9	2–5	—	1–5	3–3	5–8	8–5	3–4	4–9	0–7	22–24
Minnesota	0–6	3–3	12–1	3–10	7–6	4–2	7–6	5–1	—	0–6	6–1	5–2	3–4	5–2	4–2	18–28
New York	5–8	7–6	5–1	4–2	4–2	6–1	5–2	3–3	6–0	—	5–2	4–3	7–6	3–3	7–6	23–23
Oakland	3–3	1–5	3–3	1–6	3–3	5–8	2–4	8–5	1–6	2–5	—	4–9	3–4	6–7	3–3	24–22
Seattle	2–4	3–4	6–1	2–4	1–5	8–5	3–3	5–8	2–5	3–4	9–4	—	3–3	10–3	2–4	26–20
Tampa Bay	4–9	7–6	2–4	4–3	1–5	2–4	3–3	4–3	4–3	6–7	4–3	3–3	—	1–5	9–4	26–20
Texas	2–5	2–4	7–0	2–4	4–3	6–7	5–1	9–4	2–5	3–3	7–6	3–10	5–1	—	2–4	19–27
Toronto	6–7	5–8	5–1	2–4	2–5	2–5	2–5	7–0	2–4	6–7	3–3	4–2	4–9	4–2	—	20–26

Updated with the results of all games through September 30, 2024.

==== Record vs. National League ====
2024 American League record vs. National League Source: MLB Standings
Team	AZ	ATL	CHC	CIN	COL	LAD	MIA	MIL	NYM	PHI	PIT	SD	SF	STL	WSH
Baltimore	2–1	2–1	0–3	3–0	2–1	1–2	1–2	1–2	1–2	2–1	1–2	1–2	1–2	0–3	2–2
Boston	0–3	1–3	2–1	2–1	1–2	0–3	3–0	1–2	0–3	2–1	3–0	1–2	2–1	1–2	2–1
Chicago	1–2	2–1	0–4	0–3	2–1	0–3	1–2	0–3	0–3	0–3	0–3	0–3	1–2	2–1	2–1
Cleveland	0–3	1–2	3–0	3–1	1–2	1–2	2–1	0–3	3–0	2–1	2–1	1–2	2–1	1–2	2–1
Detroit	2–1	0–3	1–2	3–0	2–1	2–1	1–2	1–2	2–1	1–2	2–2	1–2	1–2	2–1	1–2
Houston	2–1	0–3	0–3	0–3	4–0	2–1	3–0	2–1	2–1	1–2	1–2	1–2	1–2	2–1	1–2
Kansas City	1–2	1–2	1–2	3–0	1–2	1–2	2–1	2–1	1–2	1–2	2–1	1–2	0–3	3–1	3–0
Los Angeles	1–2	1–2	1–2	0–3	1–2	2–2	3–0	1–2	2–1	1–2	2–1	3–0	2–1	1–2	1–2
Minnesota	2–1	0–3	1–2	1–2	2–1	1–2	1–2	1–3	1–2	2–1	1–2	1–2	1–2	1–2	2–1
New York	2–1	1–2	2–1	0–3	2–1	1–2	2–1	2–1	0–4	3–0	1–2	2–1	3–0	1–2	1–2
Oakland	1–2	1–2	2–1	2–1	2–1	1–2	2–1	1–2	2–1	2–1	3–0	0–3	2–2	1–2	2–1
Seattle	2–1	2–1	1–2	3–0	2–1	0–3	1–2	1–2	3–0	2–1	1–2	3–1	2–1	2–1	1–2
Tampa Bay	3–0	1–2	2–1	2–1	2–1	1–2	3–1	1–2	3–0	0–3	2–1	1–2	2–1	1–2	2–1
Texas	2–2	1–2	2–1	2–1	0–3	2–1	2–1	0–3	1–2	0–3	2–1	1–2	1–2	1–2	2–1
Toronto	1–2	1–2	1–2	1–2	2–1	1–2	0–3	1–2	1–2	1–3	2–1	2–1	2–1	3–0	1–2

Updated with the results of all games through September 30, 2024.

== Game log ==
Legend
	Twins win
	Twins loss
	Postponement
	Eliminated from playoff spot
**Bold**	Twins team member

2024 game log: 82–80 (Home: 43–38; Away: 39–42)
March/April: 16–13 (Home: 6–6; Away: 10–7)

#	Date	Opponent	Score	Win	Loss	Save	Attendance	Record	Streak
1	March 28	@ Royals	4–1	**López** (1–0)	Ragans (0–1)	**Jax** (1)	38,775	1–0	W1
2	March 30	@ Royals	5–1	**Jax** (1–0)	Smith (0–1)	—	19,461	2–0	W2
3	March 31	@ Royals	0–11	Singer (1–0)	**Ober** (0–1)	—	13,005	2–1	L1
4	April 2	@ Brewers	2–3	Peguero (2–0)	**Varland** (0–1)	Uribe (3)	41,659	2–2	L2
5	April 3	@ Brewers	7–3	**Duarte** (1–0)	Payamps (0–1)	—	17,854	3–2	W1
6	April 4	Guardians	2–4	Bibee (1–0)	**López** (1–1)	Clase (3)	35,595	3–3	L1
7	April 6	Guardians	1–3	Sandlin (2–0)	**Ryan** (0–1)	Clase (4)	25,806	3–4	L2
—	April 7	Guardians	Postponed (rain); Makeup: August 9						
8	April 8	Dodgers	2–4	Paxton (2–0)	**Jackson** (0–1)	Phillips (4)	15,177	3–5	L3
9	April 9	Dodgers	3–6	Glasnow (3–0)	**Varland** (0–2)	—	17,024	3–6	L4
10	April 10	Dodgers	3–2	**Funderburk** (1–0)	Vesia (0–1)	**Okert** (1)	18,640	4–6	W1
—	April 11	@ Tigers	Postponed (rain); Makeup: April 13						
11	April 12	@ Tigers	2–8	Skubal (2–0)	**López** (1–2)	—	12,434	4–7	L1
12	April 13 (1)	@ Tigers	11–5 (12)	**Alcalá** (1–0)	Lange (0–1)	—	see 2nd game	5–7	W1
13	April 13 (2)	@ Tigers	4–1	**Woods Richardson** (1–0)	Manning (0–1)	**Sands** (1)	22,548	6–7	W2
14	April 14	@ Tigers	3–4	Vest (1–0)	**Jax** (1–1)	Foley (4)	17,317	6–8	L1
15	April 15	@ Orioles	4–7	Tate (1–0)	**Varland** (0–3)	Kimbrel (4)	14,611	6–9	L2
16	April 16	@ Orioles	3–11	Rodriguez (3–0)	**Paddack** (0–1)	—	18,108	6–10	L3
17	April 17	@ Orioles	2–4	Kimbrel (3–0)	**Jax** (1–2)	—	15,860	6–11	L4
18	April 19	Tigers	4–5	Chafin (2–0)	**Thielbar** (0–1)	Foley (6)	13,849	6–12	L5
19	April 20	Tigers	4–3	**Ober** (1–1)	Olson (0–3)	**Jax** (2)	20,064	7–12	W1
20	April 21	Tigers	1–6	Mize (1–0)	**Varland** (0–4)	—	17,757	7–13	L1
21	April 22	White Sox	7–0	**Paddack** (1–1)	Cannon (0–1)	—	12,443	8–13	W1
22	April 23	White Sox	6–5	**Jackson** (1–1)	Wilson (1–2)	—	11,223	9–13	W2
23	April 24	White Sox	6–3	**Ryan** (1–1)	Crochet (1–4)	**Jax** (3)	12,546	10–13	W3
24	April 25	White Sox	6–3	**Sands** (1–0)	Banks (0–2)	**Jax** (4)	20,363	11–13	W4
25	April 26	@ Angels	5–3	**Ober** (2–1)	Sandoval (1–4)	**Thielbar** (1)	31,087	12–13	W5
26	April 27	@ Angels	16–5	**Paddack** (2–1)	Soriano (0–4)	—	44,478	13–13	W6
27	April 28	@ Angels	11–5	**López** (2–2)	Detmers (3–2)	—	38,955	14–13	W7
28	April 29	@ White Sox	3–2	**Jax** (2–2)	Brebbia (0–1)	**Thielbar** (2)	10,772	15–13	W8
29	April 30	@ White Sox	6–5	**Thielbar** (1–1)	Kopech (0–3)	**Durán** (1)	11,609	16–13	W9

May: 16–12 (Home: 10–7; Away: 6–5)

#	Date	Opponent	Score	Win	Loss	Save	Attendance	Record	Streak
30	May 1	@ White Sox	10–5	**Ober** (3–1)	Leone (0–1)	—	12,216	17–13	W10
31	May 3	Red Sox	5–2	**Paddack** (3–1)	Houck (3–3)	**Durán** (2)	24,488	18–13	W11
32	May 4	Red Sox	3–1	**López** (3–2)	Booser (0–1)	**Sands** (2)	23,587	19–13	W12
33	May 5	Red Sox	2–9	Bernardino (1–0)	**Ryan** (1–2)	—	29,638	19–14	L1
34	May 6	Mariners	3–1	**Jax** (3–2)	Castillo (3–5)	**Thielbar** (3)	14,384	20–14	W1
35	May 7	Mariners	6–10	Stanek (1–0)	**Alcalá** (1–1)	—	14,710	20–15	L1
36	May 8	Mariners	6–3	**Paddack** (4–1)	Kirby (3–3)	**Durán** (3)	15,685	21–15	W1
37	May 9	Mariners	11–1	**López** (4–2)	Gilbert (3–1)	—	22,154	22–15	W2
38	May 10	@ Blue Jays	3–2	**Ryan** (2–2)	Kikuchi (2–3)	**Jax** (5)	34,205	23–15	W3
39	May 11	@ Blue Jays	8–10	Swanson (1–2)	**Jackson** (1–2)	Romano (6)	35,069	23–16	L1
40	May 12	@ Blue Jays	5–1	**Ober** (4–1)	Manoah (0–1)	—	32,200	24–16	W1
41	May 14	Yankees	1–5	Rodón (4–2)	**Paddack** (4–2)	—	23,805	24–17	L1
42	May 15	Yankees	0–4	Stroman (3–2)	**López** (4–3)	—	22,235	24–18	L2
43	May 16	Yankees	0–5	Schmidt (5–1)	**Ryan** (2–3)	—	31,569	24–19	L3
44	May 17	@ Guardians	2–3	Herrin (2–0)	**Durán** (0–1)	Clase (13)	30,121	24–20	L4
45	May 18	@ Guardians	4–11	Allen (5–2)	**Ober** (4–2)	—	35,545	24–21	L5
46	May 19	@ Guardians	2–5	Clase (3–1)	**Durán** (0–2)	—	25,136	24–22	L6
47	May 20	@ Nationals	3–12	Parker (3–2)	**López** (4–4)	—	16,979	24–23	L7
48	May 21	@ Nationals	10–0	**Ryan** (3–3)	Corbin (1–5)	—	23,597	25–23	W1
49	May 22	@ Nationals	3–2	**Okert** (1–0)	Irvin (2–5)	**Durán** (4)	21,837	26–23	W2
50	May 24	Rangers	3–2	**Ober** (5–2)	Ureña (1–4)	**Durán** (5)	21,857	27–23	W3
51	May 25	Rangers	5–3	**Sands** (2–0)	Robertson (2–2)	**Durán** (6)	30,957	28–23	W4
52	May 26	Rangers	2–6	Latz (1–1)	**López** (4–5)	—	27,917	28–24	L1
53	May 27	Royals	6–5	**Ryan** (4–3)	Marsh (4–2)	**Durán** (7)	17,508	29–24	W1
54	May 28	Royals	4–2	**Woods Richardson** (2–0)	Ragans (4–4)	**Durán** (8)	15,174	30–24	W2
55	May 29	Royals	1–6	Lugo (9–1)	**Ober** (5–3)	—	18,130	30–25	L1
56	May 30	Royals	7–6	**Thielbar** (2–1)	Stratton (2–3)	**Durán** (9)	22,542	31–25	W1
57	May 31	@ Astros	6–1	**López** (5–5)	Blanco (5–1)	—	36,903	32–25	W2

June: 15–12 (Home: 7–3; Away: 8–9)

#	Date	Opponent	Score	Win	Loss	Save	Attendance	Record	Streak
58	June 1	@ Astros	2–5	Valdez (4–3)	**Ryan** (4–4)	Hader (8)	33,855	32–26	L1
59	June 2	@ Astros	4–3	**Okert** (2–0)	Pressly (0–3)	**Durán** (10)	34,242	33–26	W1
60	June 4	@ Yankees	1–5	Gil (8–1)	**Ober** (5–4)	—	37,139	33–27	L1
61	June 5	@ Yankees	5–9	Rodón (8–2)	**Paddack** (4–3)	—	43,202	33–28	L2
62	June 6	@ Yankees	5–8	Weaver (4–1)	**López** (5–6)	Holmes (18)	41,380	33–29	L3
63	June 7	@ Pirates	0–3	Keller (8–3)	**Ryan** (4–5)	Bednar (13)	19,552	33–30	L4
64	June 8	@ Pirates	0–4	Stratton (2–1)	**Woods Richardson** (2–1)	—	29,700	33–31	L5
65	June 9	@ Pirates	11–5 (10)	**Durán** (1–2)	Heller (0–1)	—	24,463	34–31	W1
66	June 10	Rockies	5–0	**Paddack** (5–3)	Hudson (2–8)	—	19,901	35–31	W2
67	June 11	Rockies	4–5	Quantrill (6–4)	**Thielbar** (2–2)	Kinley (5)	21,998	35–32	L1
68	June 12	Rockies	17–9	**López** (6–6)	Gomber (1–4)	—	18,875	36–32	W1
69	June 13	Athletics	6–2	**Ryan** (5–5)	Medina (0–2)	—	23,229	37–32	W2
70	June 14	Athletics	6–5 (10)	**Durán** (2–2)	Alexander (0–2)	—	35,631	38–32	W3
—	June 15	Athletics	Postponed (rain); Makeup: June 16						
71	June 16 (1)	Athletics	6–2	**Ober** (6–4)	Sears (4–6)	**Durán** (11)	33,835	39–32	W4
72	June 16 (2)	Athletics	8–7	**Staumont** (1–0)	Jiménez (1–2)	**Jax** (6)	20,787	40–32	W5
73	June 18	Rays	7–6	**Durán** (3–2)	Fairbanks (1–3)	—	17,342	41–32	W6
74	June 19	Rays	2–3 (10)	Adam (4–1)	**Alcalá** (1–2)	Maton (2)	20,712	41–33	L1
75	June 20	Rays	6–7 (10)	Fairbanks (2–3)	**Jax** (3–3)	—	24,863	41–34	L2
76	June 21	@ Athletics	5–6	Newcomb (1–0)	**Durán** (3–3)	Miller (14)	9,158	41–35	L3
77	June 22	@ Athletics	10–2	**Ober** (7–4)	Sears (4–7)	—	9,299	42–35	W1
78	June 23	@ Athletics	3–0	**López** (7–6)	Harris (1–1)	**Jax** (7)	18,491	43–35	W2
79	June 25	@ Diamondbacks	4–5	Ginkel (6–1)	**Alcalá** (1–3)	Sewald (10)	21,485	43–36	L1
80	June 26	@ Diamondbacks	8–3	**Woods Richardson** (3–1)	Nelson (5–6)	—	16,396	44–36	W1
81	June 27	@ Diamondbacks	13–6	**Festa** (1–0)	Montgomery (6–5)	—	22,671	45–36	W2
82	June 28	@ Mariners	2–3 (10)	Stanek (5–1)	**Sands** (2–1)	—	44,924	45–37	L1
83	June 29	@ Mariners	5–1	**López** (8–6)	Miller (6–7)	—	35,551	46–37	W1
84	June 30	@ Mariners	5–3	**Sands** (3–1)	Stanek (5–2)	**Durán** (12)	33,367	47–37	W2

July: 12–11 (Home: 6–5; Away: 6–6)

#	Date	Opponent	Score	Win	Loss	Save	Attendance	Record	Streak
85	July 2	Tigers	5–3	**Alcalá** (2–3)	Vest (1–2)	**Durán** (13)	19,609	48–37	W3
86	July 3	Tigers	2–9	Montero (1–2)	**Festa** (1–1)	—	25,053	48–38	L1
87	July 4	Tigers	12–3 (7)	**Ober** (8–4)	Maeda (2–5)	—	20,893	49–38	W1
88	July 5	Astros	12–13	King (1–0)	**López** (8–7)	Hader (15)	28,129	49–39	L1
89	July 6	Astros	9–3	**Ryan** (6–5)	Brown (6–6)	—	31,431	50–39	W1
90	July 7	Astros	3–2	**Durán** (4–3)	Hader (3–5)	—	28,056	51–39	W2
91	July 8	@ White Sox	8–6 (11)	**Durán** (5–3)	Shuster (1–2)	**Funderburk** (1)	10,881	52–39	W3
—	July 9	@ White Sox	Postponed (rain); Makeup: July 10						
92	July 10 (1)	@ White Sox	1–3	Fedde (7–3)	**Ober** (8–5)	Kopech (9)	see 2nd game	52–40	L1
93	July 10 (2)	@ White Sox	3–2	**Okert** (3–0)	Soroka (0–10)	**Durán** (14)	13,607	53–40	W1
94	July 12	@ Giants	1–7	Harrison (5–4)	**Ryan** (6–6)	—	34,106	53–41	L1
95	July 13	@ Giants	4–2	**Sands** (4–1)	Rogers (1–3)	**Durán** (15)	32,582	54–41	W1
96	July 14	@ Giants	2–3	Walker (6–3)	**Durán** (5–4)	—	34,115	54–42	L1
ASG	July 16	NL @ AL	3–5	Miller (1–0)	Greene (0–1)	Clase (1)	39,343	—	N/A
97	July 20	Brewers	4–8 (12)	Junis (2–0)	**Okert** (3–1)	—	41,679	54–43	L2
98	July 21	Brewers	7–8	Koenig (8–1)	**Jax** (3–4)	Megill (19)	36,327	54–44	L3
99	July 22	Phillies	7–2	**Ober** (9–5)	Suárez (10–5)	**Sands** (3)	29,904	55–44	W1
100	July 23	Phillies	0–3	Soto (2–3)	**Durán** (5–5)	Strahm (1)	31,272	55–45	L1
101	July 24	Phillies	5–4	**Durán** (6–5)	Soto (2–4)	—	33,813	56–45	W1
102	July 26	@ Tigers	9–3	**López** (9–7)	Montero (1–4)	—	27,778	57–45	W2
103	July 27	@ Tigers	2–7	Skubal (12–3)	**Ryan** (6–7)	—	35,138	57–46	L1
104	July 28	@ Tigers	5–0	**Ober** (10–5)	Faedo (5–2)	—	24,264	58–46	W1
105	July 29	@ Mets	2–15	Quintana (6–6)	**Woods Richardson** (3–2)	Buttó (2)	28,507	58–47	L1
106	July 30	@ Mets	0–2	Manaea (7–4)	**Festa** (1–2)	Díaz (13)	27,767	58–48	L2
107	July 31	@ Mets	8–3	**López** (10–7)	Severino (7–4)	—	28,875	59–48	W1

August: 14–14 (Home: 9–9; Away: 5–5)

#	Date	Opponent	Score	Win	Loss	Save	Attendance	Record	Streak
108	August 2	White Sox	10–2	**Ryan** (7–7)	Martin (0–1)	—	30,801	60–48	W2
109	August 3	White Sox	6–2	**Ober** (11–5)	Toussaint (0–1)	—	38,289	61–48	W3
110	August 4	White Sox	13–7	**Sands** (5–1)	Flexen (2–11)	—	28,302	62–48	W4
111	August 5	@ Cubs	3–0	**Festa** (2–2)	Hendricks (3–10)	**Jax** (8)	35,382	63–48	W5
112	August 6	@ Cubs	3–7	Imanaga (9–2)	**López** (10–8)	—	36,653	63–49	L1
113	August 7	@ Cubs	2–8	López (2–2)	**Richards** (2–2)	—	35,059	63–50	L2
114	August 9 (1)	Guardians	4–2	**Ober** (12–5)	Cantillo (0–2)	**Durán** (16)	23,217	64–50	W1
115	August 9 (2)	Guardians	6–3	**Sands** (6–1)	Cobb (0–1)	**Richards** (1)	28,605	65–50	W2
116	August 10	Guardians	1–2	Williams (2–4)	**Woods Richardson** (3–3)	Clase (34)	30,314	65–51	L1
117	August 11	Guardians	3–5	Bibee (10–4)	**Thielbar** (2–3)	Clase (35)	30,084	65–52	L2
118	August 12	Royals	8–3	**López** (11–8)	Singer (8–8)	—	22,173	66–52	W1
119	August 13	Royals	13–3	**Matthews** (1–0)	Lugo (13–7)	—	25,885	67–52	W2
120	August 14	Royals	1–4	Ragans (10–7)	**Varland** (0–5)	Erceg (5)	27,560	67–53	L1
121	August 15	@ Rangers	3–2	**Alcalá** (3–3)	Yates (4–2)	**Durán** (17)	29,558	68–53	W1
122	August 16	@ Rangers	4–3	**Woods Richardson** (4–3)	Heaney (4–13)	**Durán** (18)	28,705	69–53	W2
123	August 17	@ Rangers	5–2	**Henríquez** (1–0)	Eovaldi (8–7)	**Sands** (4)	31,192	70–53	W3
124	August 18	@ Rangers	5–6 (10)	Chafin (4–2)	**Durán** (6–6)	—	30,735	70–54	L1
125	August 19	@ Padres	3–5	King (11–6)	**Matthews** (1–1)	Suárez (28)	40,220	70–55	L2
126	August 20	@ Padres	5–7	Scott (8–5)	**Okert** (3–2)	Suárez (29)	39,143	70–56	L3
127	August 21	@ Padres	11–4	**Woods Richardson** (5–3)	Waldron (7–11)	—	36,589	71–56	W1
128	August 23	Cardinals	1–6	Pallante (6–6)	**Festa** (2–3)	—	29,634	71–57	L1
129	August 24	Cardinals	6–0	**López** (12–8)	Gray (11–9)	—	35,183	72–57	W1
130	August 25	Cardinals	2–3	Armstrong (3–2)	**Durán** (6–7)	Helsley (40)	28,018	72–58	L1
131	August 26	Braves	6–10	Fried (8–7)	**Ober** (12–6)	—	18,974	72–59	L2
132	August 27	Braves	6–8 (10)	Iglesias (4–1)	**Durán** (6–7)	—	20,200	72–60	L3
133	August 28	Braves	1–5	Sale (15–3)	**Festa** (2–4)	—	19,142	72–61	L4
134	August 30	Blue Jays	2–0	**López** (13–8)	Gausman (12–10)	**Durán** (19)	24,623	73–61	W1
135	August 31	Blue Jays	0–15	Berríos (14–9)	**Matthews** (1–2)	—	30,517	73–62	L1

September: 9–18 (Home: 5–8; Away: 4–10)

#	Date	Opponent	Score	Win	Loss	Save	Attendance	Record	Streak
136	September 1	Blue Jays	4–3	**Jax** (4–4)	Green (4–4)	**Durán** (20)	32,774	74–62	W1
137	September 2	@ Rays	5–4	**Alcalá** (4–3)	Littell (5–9)	**Durán** (21)	11,636	75–62	W2
138	September 3	@ Rays	1–2	Springs (2–2)	**Festa** (2–5)	Cleavinger (5)	10,531	75–63	L1
139	September 4	@ Rays	4–9	Alexander (6–4)	**Varland** (0–6)	—	11,513	75–64	L2
140	September 5	@ Rays	4–3	**López** (14–8)	Bradley (6–10)	**Durán** (22)	10,584	76–64	W1
141	September 6	@ Royals	0–5	Ragans (11–9)	**Matthews** (1–3)	—	19,484	76–65	L1
142	September 7	@ Royals	2–4	Lynch IV (1–0)	**Durán** (6–9)	Erceg (10)	29,160	76–66	L2
143	September 8	@ Royals	0–2	Wacha (12–7)	**Woods Richardson** (5–4)	Erceg (11)	26,477	76–67	L3
144	September 9	Angels	2–6	Detmers (4–6)	**Festa** (2–6)	Suárez (1)	14,445	76–68	L4
145	September 10	Angels	10–5	**López** (15–8)	Canning (5–13)	—	18,311	77–68	W1
146	September 11	Angels	6–4	**Sands** (7–1)	Kochanowicz (2–5)	**Durán** (23)	15,660	78–68	W2
147	September 13	Reds	4–8	Aguiar (2–0)	**Ober** (12–7)	—	27,170	78–69	L1
148	September 14	Reds	1–11	Martinez (9–6)	**Woods Richardson** (5–5)	Suter (2)	28,881	78–70	L2
149	September 15	Reds	9–2	**Sands** (8–1)	Lowder (1–2)	—	22,545	79–70	W1
150	September 16	@ Guardians	3–4	Walters (1–0)	**Jax** (4–5)	Clase (46)	17,559	79–71	L1
151	September 17	@ Guardians	4–1	**Sands** (9–1)	Williams (3–10)	**Jax** (9)	17,391	80–71	W1
152	September 18	@ Guardians	4–5 (10)	Gaddis (5–3)	**Henríquez** (1–1)	—	19,391	80–72	L1
153	September 19	@ Guardians	2–3 (10)	Morgan (3–0)	**Thielbar** (2–4)	—	21,707	80–73	L2
154	September 20	@ Red Sox	4–2 (12)	**Blewett** (1–0)	Criswell (6–5)	**Jax** (10)	33,052	81–73	W1
—	September 21	@ Red Sox	Postponed (rain); Makeup: September 22						
155	September 22 (1)	@ Red Sox	1–8	Pivetta (6–11)	**López** (15–9)	—	32,307	81–74	L1
156	September 22 (2)	@ Red Sox	3–9	Crawford (9–15)	**Irvin** (6–6)	—	31,941	81–75	L2
157	September 24	Marlins	1–4	Weathers (4–6)	**Ober** (12–8)	Tinoco (3)	21,983	81–76	L3
158	September 25	Marlins	8–3	**Jax** (5–5)	Petersen (3–1)	—	18,162	82–76	W1
159	September 26	Marlins	6–8 (13)	Maldonado (1–1)	**Blewett** (1–1)	McCaughan (1)	17,341	82–77	L1
160	September 27	Orioles	2–7	Povich (3–9)	**López** (15–10)	—	26,058	82–78	L2
161	September 28	Orioles	2–9	Davidson (1–0)	**Matthews** (1–4)	—	30,558	82–79	L3
162	September 29	Orioles	2–6	Suárez (9–7)	**Ober** (12–9)	—	26,041	82–80	L4

== Roster ==
2024 Minnesota Twins
Roster
Pitchers: 66 Jorge Alcalá; 60 Scott Blewett; 73 Caleb Boushley; 51 Matt Bowman; 62 Diego Castillo; 68 Randy Dobnak; 54 Daniel Duarte; 59 Jhoan Durán; 58 David Festa; 55 Kody Funderburk; 53 Brent Headrick; 31 Ronny Henriquez; 24 Cole Irvin; 32 Jay Jackson; 22 Griffin Jax; 49 Pablo López; 52 Zebby Matthews; 17 Bailey Ober; 14 Steven Okert; 20 Chris Paddack; 32 Trevor Richards; 41 Joe Ryan; 44 Cole Sands; 63 Josh Staumont; 61 Brock Stewart; 56 Caleb Thielbar; 39 Michael Tonkin; 48 Justin Topa; 37 Louie Varland; 74 Josh Winder; 78 Simeon Woods Richardson	Catchers: 85 Jaír Camargo; 27 Ryan Jeffers; 8 Christian Vázquez; Infielders: 39 Diego Castillo; 50 Willi Castro; 4 Carlos Correa; 12 Kyle Farmer; 47 Edouard Julien; 72 Brooks Lee; 23 Royce Lewis; 64 José Miranda; 30 Carlos Santana	Outfielders: 25 Byron Buxton; 89 Michael Helman; 89 DaShawn Keirsey Jr.; 26 Max Kepler; 19 Alex Kirilloff; 9 Trevor Larnach; 13 Manuel Margot; 82 Austin Martin; 38 Matt Wallner	Manager: 5 Rocco Baldelli; Coaches: 35 Hank Conger (first base/catching); 75 Nate Dammann (quality control); 98 Anderson De La Rosa (bullpen catcher); 46 Tony Diaz (assistant bench); 63 Rudy Hernández (hitting); 88 Pete Maki (pitching); 98 Connor Olson (bullpen catcher); 79 David Popkins (hitting); 91 Luis Ramirez (assistant pitching); 67 Derek Shomon (assistant hitting); 84 Colby Suggs (bullpen); 33 Jayce Tingler (bench); 40 Tommy Watkins (third base)

== Player stats ==
= Indicates team leader

=== Batting ===
Note: G = Games played; AB = At bats; R = Runs scored; H = Hits; 2B = Doubles; 3B = Triples; HR = Home runs; RBI = Runs batted in; SB = Stolen bases; BB = Walks; AVG = Batting average; SLG = Slugging average

Player	G	AB	R	H	2B	3B	HR	RBI	SB	BB	AVG	SLG
Willi Castro	158	558	89	138	31	5	12	60	14	51	.247	.385
Carlos Santana	150	521	63	124	26	0	23	71	4	65	.238	.420
Ryan Jeffers	122	412	56	93	22	0	21	64	3	32	.226	.432
José Miranda	121	401	44	114	28	4	9	49	2	18	.284	.441
Max Kepler	105	368	43	93	21	1	8	42	1	22	.253	.380
Byron Buxton	102	355	62	99	27	3	18	56	7	20	.279	.524
Trevor Larnach	112	355	59	92	17	0	15	52	4	40	.259	.434
Carlos Correa	86	319	55	99	20	2	14	54	0	40	.310	.517
Manuel Margot	129	315	37	75	17	1	4	31	5	21	.238	.337
Christian Vázquez	93	294	29	65	10	0	7	27	3	11	.221	.327
Royce Lewis	82	292	40	68	16	0	16	47	0	28	.233	.452
Edouard Julien	94	266	36	53	9	0	8	21	6	33	.199	.323
Austin Martin	93	233	41	59	18	1	1	16	7	20	.253	.352
Matt Wallner	75	220	26	57	17	1	13	37	3	24	.259	.523
Kyle Farmer	107	215	26	46	13	1	5	25	3	19	.214	.353
Brooks Lee	50	172	9	38	6	1	3	27	3	11	.221	.320
Alex Kirilloff	57	159	20	32	8	3	5	20	0	15	.201	.384
DaShawn Keirsey Jr.	6	13	1	2	0	0	1	1	0	0	.154	.385
Michael Helman	9	10	2	3	2	0	0	0	0	0	.300	.500
Diego Castillo	4	6	3	2	1	0	0	2	0	2	.333	.500
Jaír Camargo	5	6	1	0	0	0	0	0	0	1	.000	.000
Team totals	162	5490	742	1352	309	23	183	702	65'	473	.246	.411

Source:Baseball Reference

=== Pitching ===
Note: W = Wins; L = Losses; ERA = Earned run average; G = Games pitched; GS = Games started; SV = Saves; IP = Innings pitched; H = Hits allowed; R = Runs allowed; ER = Earned runs allowed; BB = Walks allowed; SO = Strikeouts

Player	W	L	ERA	G	GS	SV	IP	H	R	ER	BB	SO
Pablo López	15	10	4.08	32	32	0	185.1	180	90	84	41	198
Bailey Ober	12	9	3.98	31	31	0	178.2	136	81	79	43	191
Joe Ryan	7	7	3.60	23	23	0	135.0	110	59	54	23	147
Simeon Woods Richardson	5	5	4.17	28	28	0	133.2	125	63	62	48	117
Chris Paddack	5	3	4.99	17	17	0	88.1	102	50	49	21	79
Cole Sands	9	1	3.28	62	0	4	71.1	59	30	26	12	85
Griffin Jax	5	5	2.03	72	0	10	71.0	47	19	16	15	95
David Festa	2	6	4.90	14	13	0	64.1	62	36	35	23	77
Jorge Alcalá	4	3	3.24	54	0	0	58.1	40	23	21	20	58
Jhoan Durán	6	9	3.64	58	0	23	54.1	48	30	22	15	66
Louie Varland	0	6	7.61	16	7	0	49.2	68	44	42	16	49
Caleb Thielbar	2	4	5.32	59	0	3	47.1	50	33	28	24	53
Zebby Matthews	1	4	6.69	9	9	0	37.2	51	31	28	11	43
Steven Okert	3	2	5.09	44	1	1	35.1	37	22	20	16	33
Kody Funderburk	1	0	6.49	27	0	1	34.2	41	26	25	15	32
Jay Jackson	1	2	7.52	20	0	0	26.1	28	24	22	9	29
Josh Staumont	1	0	3.70	25	0	0	24.1	17	12	10	14	18
Scott Blewett	1	1	1.77	12	0	0	20.1	17	5	4	8	18
Ronny Henriquez	1	1	3.26	16	1	0	19.1	20	8	7	5	15
Michael Tonkin	0	0	3.86	13	0	0	16.1	18	7	7	7	22
Brock Stewart	0	0	5.17	16	0	0	15.2	15	9	9	8	20
Trevor Richards	0	1	4.15	10	0	1	13.0	8	6	6	11	13
Diego Castillo	0	0	2.70	7	0	0	10.0	8	3	3	8	6
Randy Dobnak	0	0	5.59	5	0	0	9.2	11	6	6	5	7
Josh Winder	0	0	3.00	4	0	0	9.0	7	4	3	1	10
Matt Bowman	0	0	2.35	5	0	0	7.2	2	2	2	4	6
Kyle Farmer	0	0	6.75	3	0	0	4.0	7	3	3	1	0
Caleb Boushley	0	0	4.50	2	0	0	4.0	6	2	2	2	1
Daniel Duarte	1	0	2.25	2	0	0	4.0	2	1	1	1	3
Cole Irvin	0	1	12.27	4	0	0	3.2	6	5	5	4	2
Brent Headrick	0	0	3.00	1	0	0	3.0	2	1	1	2	5
Justin Topa	0	0	0.00	3	0	0	2.1	1	0	0	0	2
Matt Wallner	0	0	0.00	1	0	0	1.1	2	0	0	0	0
Willi Castro	0	0	0.00	2	0	0	1.1	0	0	0	0	0
Team totals	82	80	4.26	162	162	43	1440.1	1333	735	682	433	1500

Source:Baseball Reference

== Farm system ==
Level	Team	League	Manager
AAA	St. Paul Saints	International League	Toby Gardenhire
AA	Wichita Wind Surge	Texas League	Ramon Borrego
A-Advanced	Cedar Rapids Kernels	Midwest League	Brian Dinkleman
A	Fort Myers Mighty Mussels	Florida State League	Brian Meyer
Rookie	FCL Twins	Florida Complex League	Robbie Robinson
Rookie	DSL Twins	Dominican Summer League	Jimmy Alvarez
