= Logan Driscoll =

American baseball player (born 1997)

Free agent
- Catcher
- Born: November 3, 1997 (age 28); Colorado Springs, Colorado, U.S.
- Bats: Left Throws: Right

MLB debut
- September 3, 2024, for the Tampa Bay Rays

MLB statistics (through 2024 season)
- Batting average: .171
- Home runs: 1
- Runs batted in: 5
- Stats at Baseball Reference

Teams
- Tampa Bay Rays (2024)

Logan Rylee Driscoll (born November 3, 1997) is an American professional baseball catcher who is a free agent. He has played in Major League Baseball (MLB) for the Tampa Bay Rays.

== Amateur career ==
Driscoll attended Lake Braddock High School in Burke, Virginia, and George Mason University, where he played college baseball for the George Mason Patriots. In 2018, he played collegiate summer baseball with the Harwich Mariners of the Cape Cod Baseball League.

== Professional career ==
=== San Diego Padres ===
The San Diego Padres drafted Driscoll in the second round, with the 73rd overall selection, of the 2019 Major League Baseball draft. He made his professional debut with the Low–A Tri-City Dust Devils, hitting .268 with three home runs and 20 RBI over 39 games.

=== Tampa Bay Rays ===
On February 8, 2020, the Padres traded Driscoll and Manuel Margot to the Tampa Bay Rays in exchange for Emilio Pagán. He did not play in a game in 2020 due to the cancellation of the minor league season because of the COVID-19 pandemic. Driscoll returned to action in 2021 with the rookie–level Florida Complex League Rays, Single–A Charleston RiverDogs, and High–A Bowling Green Hot Rods. In 57 games for the three affiliates, he slashed .295/.374/.478 with six home runs and 28 RBI.

Driscoll spent the 2022 season with Bowling Green, playing in 60 games and hitting .229/.340/.381 with seven home runs and 39 RBI. He split the 2023 campaign between the Double–A Montgomery Biscuits and Triple–A Durham Bulls, batting .263/.331/.414 with career–highs in home runs (12) and RBI (58) over 104 appearances. Driscoll began the 2024 season with Durham.

On September 1, 2024, Driscoll was selected to the 40-man roster and promoted to the major leagues for the first time. He made his MLB debut on September 3 against the Minnesota Twins, and logged his first career hit in the game, a single off of David Festa. In 15 appearances for Tampa Bay during his rookie campaign, Driscoll batted .171/.189/.257 with one home run and five RBI.

Driscoll was optioned to Triple-A Durham to begin the 2025 season, but did not make an appearance during the regular season due to an ankle injury he suffered in spring training. Driscoll was released by the Rays on August 15, 2025. He re-signed with Tampa Bay on a minor league contract on August 25.

=== Miami Marlins ===
On August 20, 2026, the Rays traded Driscoll to the Miami Marlins in exchange for cash considerations. He had his contract selected to the major league roster the next day, and was subsequently optioned to the Triple–A Jacksonville Jumbo Shrimp. On October 30, he was sent outright off the 40-man roster and elected free agency.

== Hitting and fielding profile ==
Driscoll exhibits a patient approach at the plate, demonstrating good bat-to-ball skills and the ability to spray the ball to all fields. He covers the plate well and is adept at fighting off pitches with two strikes. While his power is more gap-oriented than home run-centric, he possesses average raw power.

Defensively, Driscoll is athletic to handle duties behind the plate and in corner outfield positions. He receives well as a catcher and has a strong arm capable of throwing out runners and making plays from the outfield. His speed is adequate for a catcher but may limit his range in the outfield.
