= Manuel Rodríguez (pitcher) =

Mexican baseball player (born 1996)

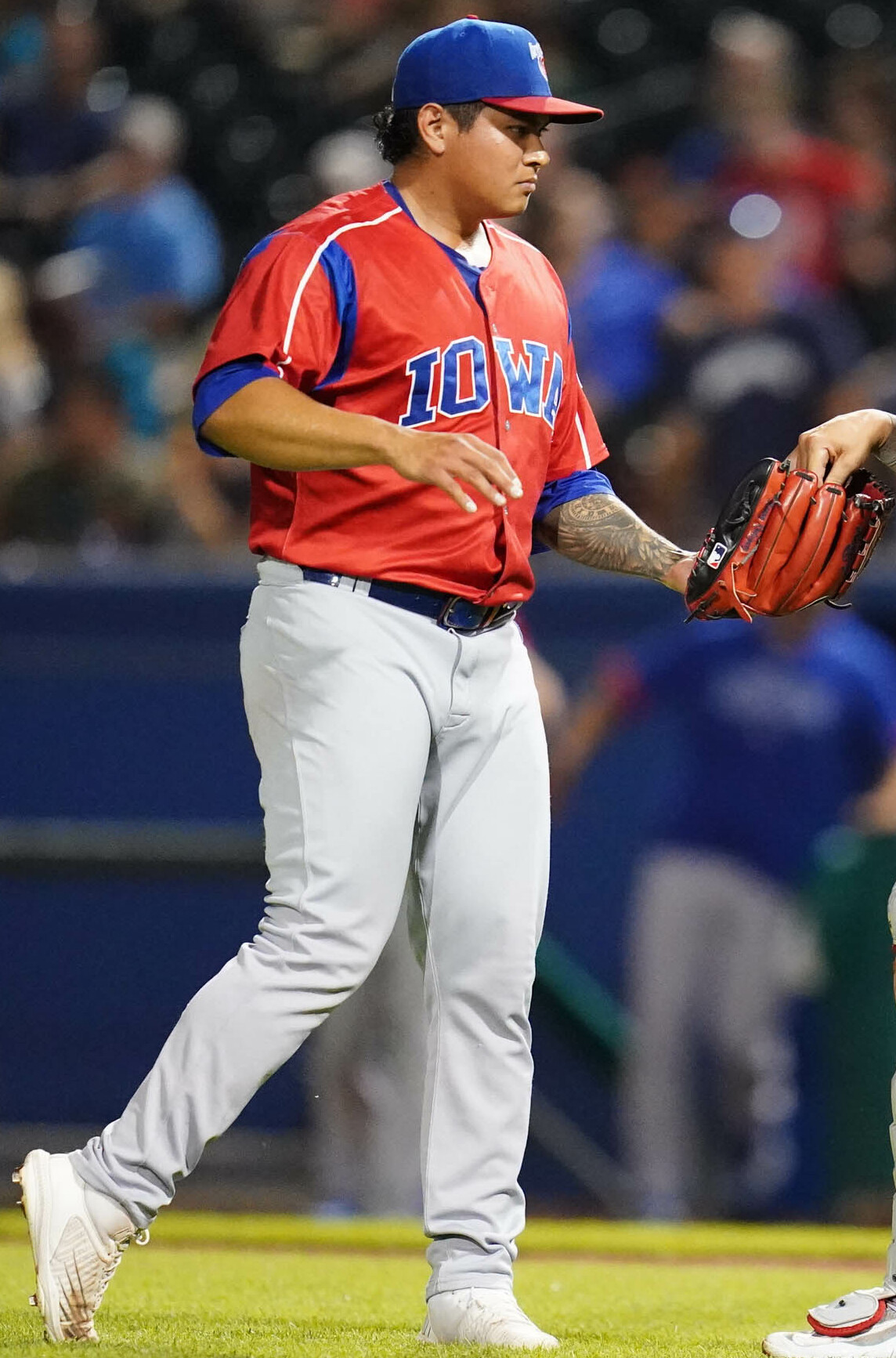
- Rodríguez with the Iowa Cubs in 2023

Tampa Bay Rays – No. 39
- Pitcher
- Born: August 6, 1996 (age 30); Mérida, Yucatán, Mexico
- Bats: Right Throws: Right

MLB debut
- July 30, 2021, for the Chicago Cubs

MLB statistics (through 2026 season)
- Win–loss record: 9–9
- Earned run average: 2.97
- Strikeouts: 93
- Stats at Baseball Reference

Teams
- Chicago Cubs (2021–2022); Tampa Bay Rays (2024–present)

Manuel De Jesus Rodríguez (born August 6, 1996) is a Mexican professional baseball pitcher for the Tampa Bay Rays of Major League Baseball (MLB). He has previously played in MLB for the Chicago Cubs.

== Career ==
=== Leones de Yucatán ===
Rodríguez began his professional career in the Mexican League with the Leones de Yucatán, playing for them from 2014 through 2016. He was named the 2015 Mexican League Rookie of the Year, after posting a 4–0 record with a 1.84 ERA over 49 innings.

=== Chicago Cubs ===
Rodríguez's contract was purchased by the Chicago Cubs from Yucatán on July 21, 2016, for $400,000. He played for the Eugene Emeralds and the South Bend Cubs in 2017, going a combined 1–0 with a 3.94 ERA over 29 2/3 innings. He spent the 2018 season with South Bend, going 3–5 with a 7.59 ERA and 64 strikeouts over 40 1/3 innings. He spent the 2019 season with the Myrtle Beach Pelicans, going 1–3 with a 3.45 ERA and 52 hits, 36 walks, and 65 strikeouts over 45 innings.

On November 20, 2019, the Cubs added Rodríguez to their 40-man roster to protect him from the Rule 5 draft. He did not play in a game in 2020 due to the cancellation of the minor league season because of the COVID-19 pandemic. Rodríguez opened the 2021 season with the Double-A Tennessee Smokies and Triple-A Iowa Cubs. In June 2021, Rodríguez was selected to play in the All-Star Futures Game.

On July 30, 2021, Chicago promoted Rodríguez to the major leagues for the first time. He made his MLB debut that night, throwing a scoreless inning with two strikeouts in relief. In 2021, Rodríguez was 3–3 with a 6.11 ERA and 16 strikeouts with the major league team. In 20 games, he pitched 17 2/3 innings, in which he gave up 18 runs, 12 earned.

Rodríguez was placed on the injured list on April 14, 2022, with a right elbow strain. He was later transferred to the 60-day injured list on June 1. Rodríguez was activated off of the injured list on August 26, and added to the active roster; Kervin Castro was sent down to Triple–A to clear active roster space for Rodríguez.

On January 17, 2023, Rodríguez was designated for assignment by Chicago following the acquisition of Julian Merryweather. On January 23, Rodríguez cleared waivers and was sent outright to Triple-A Iowa. In 35 appearances for Iowa, he registered a 4.42 ERA with 56 strikeouts and 13 saves in 38 2/3 innings pitched.

=== Tampa Bay Rays ===
On August 1, 2023, the Cubs traded Rodríguez, Adrian Sampson, and international free agent bonus pool space to the Tampa Bay Rays in exchange for Josh Roberson. In 15 games for the Triple–A Durham Bulls, he posted a 3.06 ERA with 24 strikeouts across 17 2/3 innings of work.

On November 6, 2023, the Rays added Rodríguez to their 40-man roster to prevent him from reaching minor league free agency. He was optioned to Triple–A Durham to begin the 2024 season.

Rodríguez made 31 appearances for the Rays to begin the 2025 season, registering a 1–2 record and 2.08 ERA with 25 strikeouts across 30 1/3 innings pitched. On June 11, 2025, Rodríguez was placed on the injured list with a right forearm strain. While on rehabilitation assignment with Durham, he began experiencing elbow soreness, and was transferred to the 60-day injured list on July 22. On July 26, it was announced that Rodríguez would require season-ending elbow surgery to repair his right flexor tendon.

On August 23, 2026, Rodríguez was activated for his season debut and return from surgery.
