= Bailey Ober =

American baseball player (born 1995)

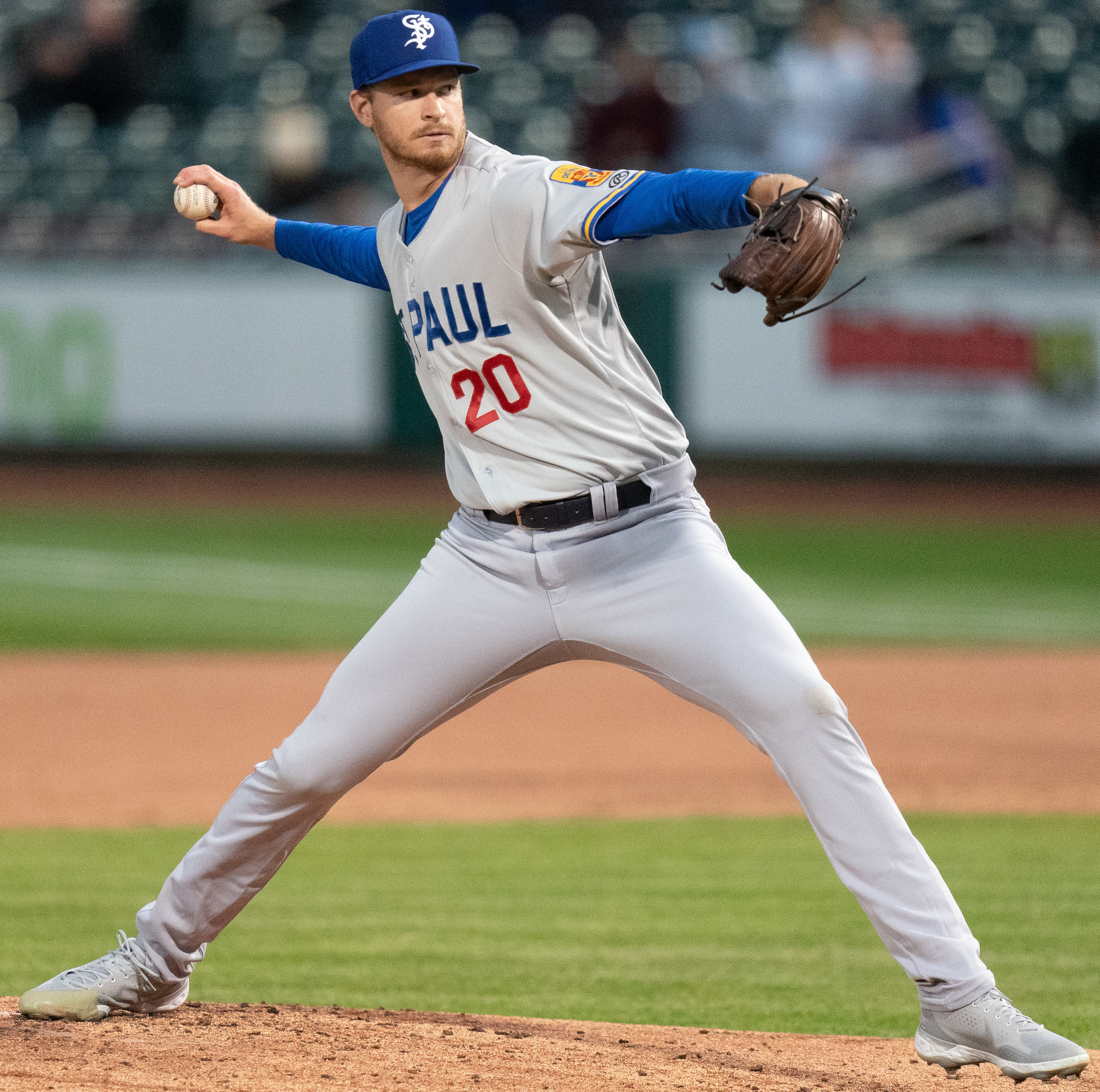
- Ober with the St. Paul Saints in 2021

Free agent
- Pitcher
- Born: July 12, 1995 (age 31); Huntersville, North Carolina, U.S.
- Bats: Right Throws: Right

MLB debut
- May 18, 2021, for the Minnesota Twins

MLB statistics (through 2026 season)
- Win–loss record: 38–37
- Earned run average: 4.15
- Strikeouts: 700
- Stats at Baseball Reference

Teams
- Minnesota Twins (2021–2026)

John Bailey Ober (born July 12, 1995) is an American professional baseball pitcher who is a free agent. He has previously played in Major League Baseball (MLB) for the Minnesota Twins. He made his MLB debut in 2021.

== Amateur career ==
Ober attended Charlotte Christian School in Charlotte, North Carolina and played college baseball at the College of Charleston. He was drafted by the Los Angeles Dodgers in the 23rd round of the 2016 MLB draft, but did not sign and returned to Charleston. He was then drafted by the Minnesota Twins in the 12th round of the 2017 MLB draft and signed.

== Professional career ==
Ober made his professional debut in 2017 with the rookie ball Elizabethton Twins, recording a 3.21 ERA in 6 games. In 2018, Ober posted a 7-1 record and 3.84 ERA in 14 appearances for the Single-A Cedar Rapids Kernels. He split the 2019 season between the Double-A Pensacola Blue Wahoos and the High-A Fort Myers Miracle, pitching to a stellar 8-0 record and 0.69 ERA in 14 games.

Ober did not play in a game in 2020 due to the cancellation of the minor league season because of the COVID-19 pandemic. On November 20, 2020, the Twins added Ober to their 40–man roster to protect him from the Rule 5 draft. He was assigned to the Triple-A St. Paul Saints to begin the 2021 season.

On May 18, 2021, Ober was promoted to the major leagues for the first time. He made his MLB debut that day as the starting pitcher against the Chicago White Sox. In 20 starts during his rookie campaign, Ober posted a 3-3 record and 4.19 ERA with 96 strikeouts in 92 1/3 innings pitched.

On July 30, 2022, Ober was placed on the 60-day injured list with a right groin strain. He was activated from the injured list on September 15. Ober made 11 starts for Minnesota in 2022, pitching to a 2–3 record and 3.21 ERA with 51 strikeouts in 56 innings of work.

Ober was optioned to the Triple-A St. Paul Saints to begin the 2023 season.

Prior to the 2026 season, Ober and the Twins agreed on a one-year deal worth $5.2 million, avoiding salary arbitration. On May 12, 2026, during a victory over the Miami Marlins, Ober recorded a Maddux on 89 pitches for his first career complete–game shutout. On June 2, he was diagnosed with a flexor strain, ultimately remaining sidelined for a month. He ended the season with a 7-7 record and 24 starts only. On November 20, 2026, Ober was non-tendered by the Twins and became a free agent.

== Personal life ==
Ober and his wife, Montana, married in 2017.
