= Richard Lovelady =

American baseball player (born 1995)

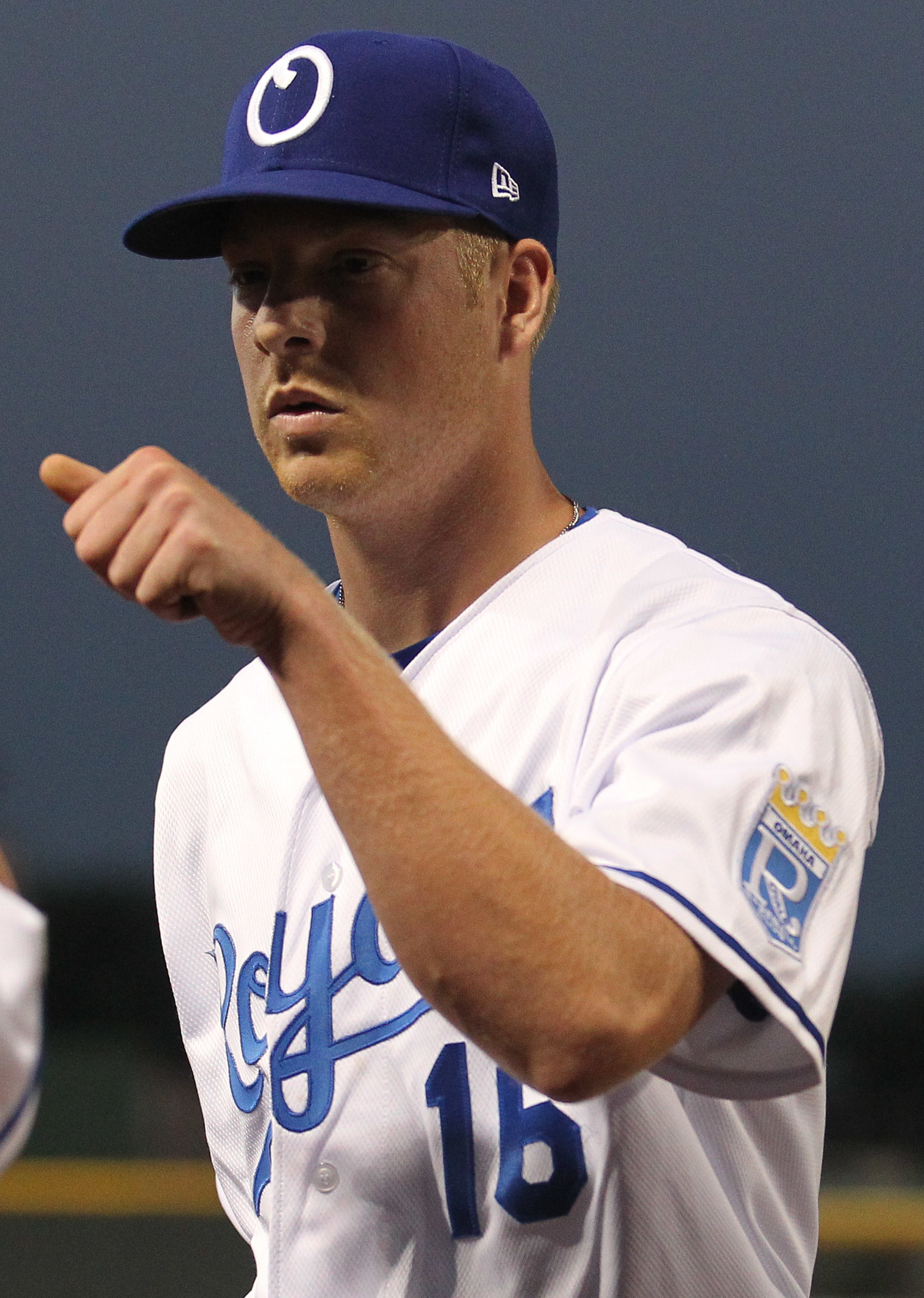
- Lovelady with the Omaha Storm Chasers in 2018

Free agent
- Pitcher
- Born: July 7, 1995 (age 31); Hinesville, Georgia, U.S.
- Bats: Left Throws: Left

MLB debut
- April 9, 2019, for the Kansas City Royals

MLB statistics (through 2026 season)
- Win–loss record: 8–17
- Earned run average: 5.05
- Strikeouts: 133
- Stats at Baseball Reference

Teams
- Kansas City Royals (2019–2021); Oakland Athletics (2023); Chicago Cubs (2024); Tampa Bay Rays (2024); Toronto Blue Jays (2025); New York Mets (2025–2026); Washington Nationals (2026)

Richard Tyler "Dicky" Lovelady (born July 7, 1995) is an American professional baseball pitcher who is a free agent. He has previously played in Major League Baseball (MLB) for the Kansas City Royals, Oakland Athletics, Chicago Cubs, Tampa Bay Rays, Toronto Blue Jays, New York Mets, and Washington Nationals. Lovelady was selected by the Royals in the 10th round of the 2016 MLB draft.

== Amateur career ==
Lovelady attended First Presbyterian Christian Academy in Hinesville, Georgia and played college baseball at East Georgia State College and Kennesaw State University. He was drafted by the Kansas City Royals in the 10th round of the 2016 Major League Baseball draft.

== Professional career ==
=== Kansas City Royals ===
Lovelady made his professional debut with the Arizona League Royals and was promoted to the Idaho Falls Chukars during the season; in 25 total relief innings pitched between both teams, he posted a 2–1 record, 1.80 ERA and a 0.92 WHIP. In 2017, he spent time with both the Wilmington Blue Rocks and the Northwest Arkansas Naturals, pitching to a combined 4–2 record and 1.62 ERA in 66 2/3 total relief innings pitched. Lovelady spent 2018 with the Omaha Storm Chasers, going 3–3 with a 2.47 ERA in 46 relief appearances. In 2019, he opened the season with Omaha.

Lovelady was promoted to the majors for the first time on April 9, 2019. He made his major league debut against the Seattle Mariners that evening, recording two strikeouts in one inning of relief. Lovelady made 1 appearance for the Royals in 2020, giving up one run over one inning pitched.

In 20 appearances for the Royals in 2021, Lovelady recorded a 3.48 ERA. On September 30, 2021, Lovelady underwent Tommy John surgery, which wiped him out for the entire 2022 season. On November 30, Lovelady was non-tendered by the Royals, making him a free agent. He was re-signed by the Royals the next day on a minor league contract.

On November 10, 2022, Lovelady was selected to the 40-man roster to be protected from the Rule 5 draft. He was optioned to Triple-A Omaha to begin the 2023 season.

=== Atlanta Braves ===
On March 30, 2023, Lovelady was traded to the Atlanta Braves in exchange for cash considerations and was optioned to the Triple-A Gwinnett Stripers. He appeared in 4 games for Gwinnett, recording a 7.20 ERA with 4 strikeouts in 5 innings pitched.

=== Oakland Athletics ===
On April 13, 2023, Lovelady was claimed off waivers by the Oakland Athletics. In 27 games for Oakland, he posted a 4.63 ERA with 24 strikeouts in 23 1/3 innings pitched. On July 23, manager Mark Kotsay announced that Lovelady would not return in 2023 after suffering a strain of the pronator muscle in his left forearm. On October 4, Lovelady was removed from the 40–man roster and sent outright to the Triple–A Las Vegas Aviators. He elected free agency following the season on November 6.

=== Chicago Cubs ===
On January 31, 2024, Lovelady signed a minor league contract with the Chicago Cubs. After 10 appearances for the Triple–A Iowa Cubs, Lovelady was added to Chicago's major league roster on April 28. In 7 appearances for Chicago, he struggled to a 7.94 ERA with 6 strikeouts across 5 2/3 innings pitched. On May 14, Lovelady was designated for assignment by the Cubs.

=== Tampa Bay Rays ===
On May 18, 2024, the Cubs traded Lovelady to the Tampa Bay Rays in exchange for Jeff Belge. In 28 appearances for Tampa Bay, he compiled a 3–5 record and 3.77 ERA with 20 strikeouts and 2 saves over 28 2/3 innings pitched. On November 19, Lovelady was designated for assignment by the Rays after Jake Mangum was added to the roster. Three days later, the Rays non–tendered Lovelady, making him a free agent.

=== Toronto Blue Jays ===
On January 22, 2025, Lovelady signed a minor league contract with the Toronto Blue Jays. On March 17, the Blue Jays selected Lovelady's contract. In 2 appearances for Toronto, he struggled to an 0–1 record and 21.60 ERA with 3 strikeouts across 1 2/3 innings pitched. Lovelady was designated for assignment by the Blue Jays on March 30. He cleared waivers and was sent outright to the Triple-A Buffalo Bisons on April 3. However, Lovelady rejected the assignment and elected free agency the following day.

=== Minnesota Twins ===
On April 8, 2025, Lovelady signed a minor league contract with the Minnesota Twins. In 19 appearances for the Triple-A St. Paul Saints, he logged an 0–1 record and 1.31 ERA with 22 strikeouts and six saves across 20 2/3 innings pitched. Lovelady opted out of his contract and was released by the Twins organization on June 18.

=== New York Mets ===
On June 23, 2025, Lovelady signed a one-year, major league contract with the New York Mets. On the same day, Lovelady requested to be known as "Dicky Lovelady" in media statements and in other unofficial contexts. His preferred name was considered humorous by fans and became popular online, and as a result, the adult website CamSoda offered Lovelady $250,000 to perform for the site.

Lovelady made one appearance for the team, allowing two runs in 1 2/3 innings against the Atlanta Braves. Lovelady was designated for assignment by the Mets on June 25. He elected free agency after clearing waivers on June 27. On June 29, Lovelady re-signed with the Mets on a new major league contract. After continued struggles over five additional games, Lovelady was designated for assignment by the team on July 18. On September 20, the Mets selected Lovelady's contract, adding him back to their active roster. He made two additional appearances for the team, allowing two runs (one earned) with four strikeouts across 3 1/3 innings pitched. Lovelady was designated for assignment by the Mets on September 25. He cleared waivers and was sent outright to the minor leagues on September 27, but he elected free agency on September 29.

On October 23, 2025, the Mets re-signed Lovelady to a one-year major league contract. On January 22, 2026, Lovelady was designated for assignment following the acquisition of Vidal Bruján. On January 29, Lovelady was claimed off waivers by the Washington Nationals. He was designated for assignment by the Nationals on March 10. On March 14, Lovelady was claimed back off waivers by the Mets. In six appearances for the team, he compiled a 1–1 record and 3.68 ERA with six strikeouts across 7 1/3 innings pitched. Lovelady was designated for assignment on April 11, following the promotion of Craig Kimbrel.

=== Washington Nationals ===
On April 16, 2026, Lovelady was traded to the Washington Nationals in exchange for cash. Lovelady made 32 appearances (including six starts) for the Nationals, compiling a 2–3 record and 4.23 ERA with 25 strikeouts and four saves across 27 2/3 innings pitched. On June 29, he was placed on the injured list due to a left triceps strain. Lovelady was transferred to the 60-day injured list on July 19. On November 2, Lovelady was removed from the 40–man roster and elected free agency.

== Personal life ==
Lovelady and his wife, Maddie, married in 2019. The couple had a son in 2023.
