= Tyler Alexander =

American baseball player (born 1994)

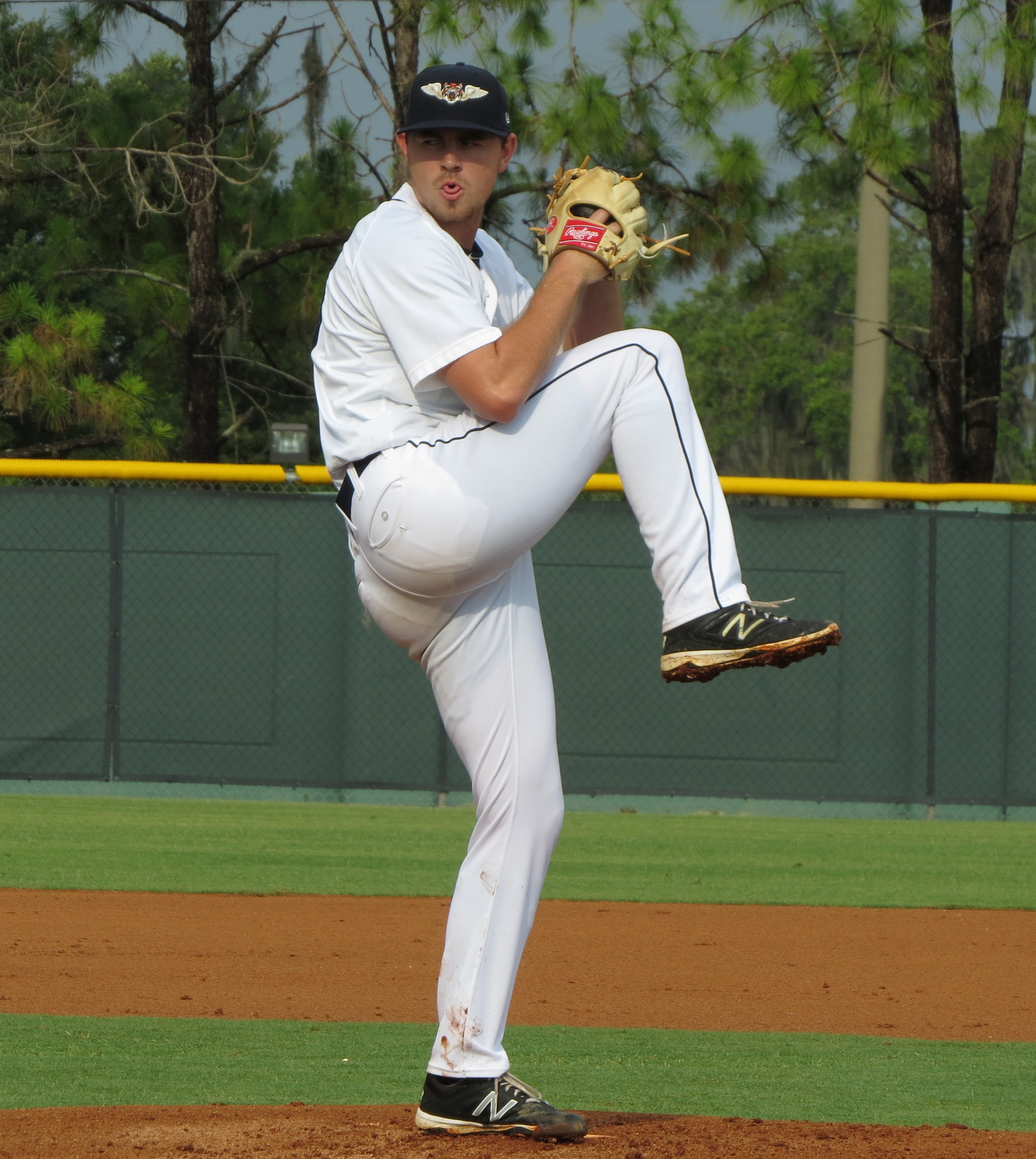
- Alexander with the Lakeland Flying Tigers

Free agent
- Pitcher
- Born: July 14, 1994 (age 32); Chicago, Illinois, U.S.
- Bats: Right Throws: Left

MLB debut
- July 3, 2019, for the Detroit Tigers

MLB statistics (through 2026 season)
- Win–loss record: 27–44
- Earned run average: 4.52
- Strikeouts: 505
- Stats at Baseball Reference

Teams
- Detroit Tigers (2019–2023); Tampa Bay Rays (2024); Milwaukee Brewers (2025); Chicago White Sox (2025); Texas Rangers (2026)

Career highlights and awards
- MLB Records: 9 consecutive strikeouts by a relief pitcher

Tyler John Alexander (born July 14, 1994) is an American professional baseball pitcher who is a free agent. He has played in Major League Baseball (MLB) for the Detroit Tigers, Tampa Bay Rays, Milwaukee Brewers, Chicago White Sox, and Texas Rangers.

== Amateur career ==
Alexander attended Carroll Senior High School in Southlake, Texas. In 2013, as a senior, he went 12–1 with a 0.66 ERA, striking out 177 batters in 94.2 innings. He was drafted by the Detroit Tigers in the 23rd round of the 2013 MLB draft, but did not sign with the Tigers and instead chose to attend Texas Christian University (TCU), where he played college baseball. As a freshman in 2014, he went 10–3 with a 2.36 ERA in twenty games (16 starts), and in 2015, as a sophomore, he went 6–3 with a 3.07 ERA in 17 games (15 starts). After his sophomore season, Alexander was again drafted by the Tigers, this time in the second round of the 2015 MLB draft.

== Professional career ==
=== Detroit Tigers ===
==== Minor leagues ====
Alexander signed with the Tigers and spent the 2015 season with the Connecticut Tigers, posting an 0–2 record and 0.97 ERA in 37 innings pitched. He started 2016 with the Lakeland Flying Tigers and was promoted to the Erie SeaWolves during the season. In 25 total games (24 starts) between the two teams, he pitched to an 8–8 record and 2.44 ERA with a 1.05 WHIP. He returned to Erie in 2017, posting an 8–9 record, a 5.07 ERA, and 120 strikeouts in 27 games (26 starts), and in 2018, he played for both Erie and the Toledo Mud Hens, going 6–8 with a 4.44 ERA in 26 games (24 starts).

==== Major leagues ====
Alexander returned to Toledo to begin the 2019 season. On July 3, 2019, the Tigers selected Alexander's contract and promoted him to the major leagues as the 26th man of a doubleheader against the Chicago White Sox. In his major league debut, he pitched five innings, allowing two runs and recording four strikeouts (including the very first batter he faced). On September 16, Alexander pitched six innings of one-run baseball against the Baltimore Orioles, earning his first major league win.

On August 2, 2020, against the Cincinnati Reds, Alexander set an MLB record for a reliever by striking out nine consecutive batters. He also tied the American League and Tigers' franchise record of nine consecutive strikeouts set by Doug Fister on September 27, 2012. He became the first pitcher with 10 or more strikeouts in a relief outing since Randy Johnson set the strikeout record for a relief pitcher with 16 on July 18, 2001. (Johnson's record was accomplished on the second day of a suspended game; while he was the first pitcher to appear that day, he was officially listed as a reliever.)

With the 2020 Detroit Tigers, Alexander appeared in 14 games, compiling a 2–3 record with a 3.96 ERA and 34 strikeouts in 36 1/3 innings pitched.

Alexander made the Tigers Opening Day roster out of 2021 spring training. He began the season as a long reliever and occasional "opener" (pitching the first two to three innings of a game), before being moved to an official starting role in July. On August 20, Alexander pitched a career-high seven innings and allowed only one run against the Toronto Blue Jays to record his first quality start of the season. Overall in 2021, Alexander appeared in 41 games (15 starts), posting a 2–4 record and 3.81 ERA, while striking out 87 batters in 106 1/3 innings.

Alexander made the Tigers' Opening Day roster out of 2022 spring training. He suffered a left elbow sprain and was placed on Detroit's 15-day IL on May 2, retroactive to April 30. He was recalled to the Tigers on June 14. On September 19, Alexander took a no-hitter into the seventh inning against the Baltimore Orioles before surrendering a leadoff single to Ryan Mountcastle. Alexander ended up throwing seven shutout innings as he and the Tigers won 11–0. On November 18, Alexander signed a one-year, $1.875 million contract with the Tigers, avoiding arbitration.

Alexander began the 2023 season mainly pitching out of Detroit's bullpen. He made 25 appearances, recording a 4.50 ERA with 44 strikeouts in 44.0 innings of work before he was placed on the 60-day injured list with a lat strain on July 4, 2023. Following the season on November 6, Alexander was designated for assignment by the Tigers.

=== Tampa Bay Rays ===
On November 10, 2023, Alexander was claimed off waivers by the Tampa Bay Rays. On May 17, 2024, he threw 7 1/3 perfect innings vs. the Toronto Blue Jays before giving up a single, a home run, and another single and being pulled. This was the 2nd longest perfect game bid in Rays history, behind the duo of Ryne Stanek and Ryan Yarbrough in 2019 and Drew Rasmussen in 2022, both 8 innings against the Baltimore Orioles. In 23 games (9 starts) for Tampa Bay, he compiled a 6–5 record and 5.10 ERA with 90 strikeouts across 107 2/3 innings pitched. On November 22, the Rays non–tendered Alexander, making him a free agent.

=== Milwaukee Brewers ===
On February 12, 2025, Alexander signed a one-year contract with the Milwaukee Brewers. In 21 appearances (four starts) for Milwaukee, he struggled to a 3–5 record and 6.19 ERA with 30 strikeouts across 36 1/3 innings pitched. On June 1, Alexander was designated for assignment by the Brewers. He elected free agency in lieu of an outright assignment to the Triple-A Nashville Sounds on June 6.

=== Chicago White Sox ===
On June 8, 2025, Alexander signed a minimum-salary, major league contract with the Chicago White Sox. He made 31 appearances (one start) for Chicago, registering a 2–9 record and 4.26 ERA with 52 strikeouts across 61 1/3 innings pitched.

=== Texas Rangers ===
On December 15, 2025, Alexander signed a one-year, $1.125 million contract with the Texas Rangers.

== Pitch selection ==
Alexander throws a combination of four-seam and two-seam fastballs. The four-seam fastball averages 91 MPH (topping out at 94 MPH). He initially threw his two-seam fastball as a sinker at 90 to 91 MPH, but opponents were hitting it for an average over .360. In 2021, Alexander began throwing his two-seamer as a cutter at an average of 87 MPH (topping out at 90 MPH). This pitch has been much more effective, with opponents hitting it at only a .222 clip that season. Alexander's main offspeed pitches are a changeup at about 84 MPH and a slider averaging 85 MPH.
