= Garrett Cleavinger =

American baseball player (born 1994)

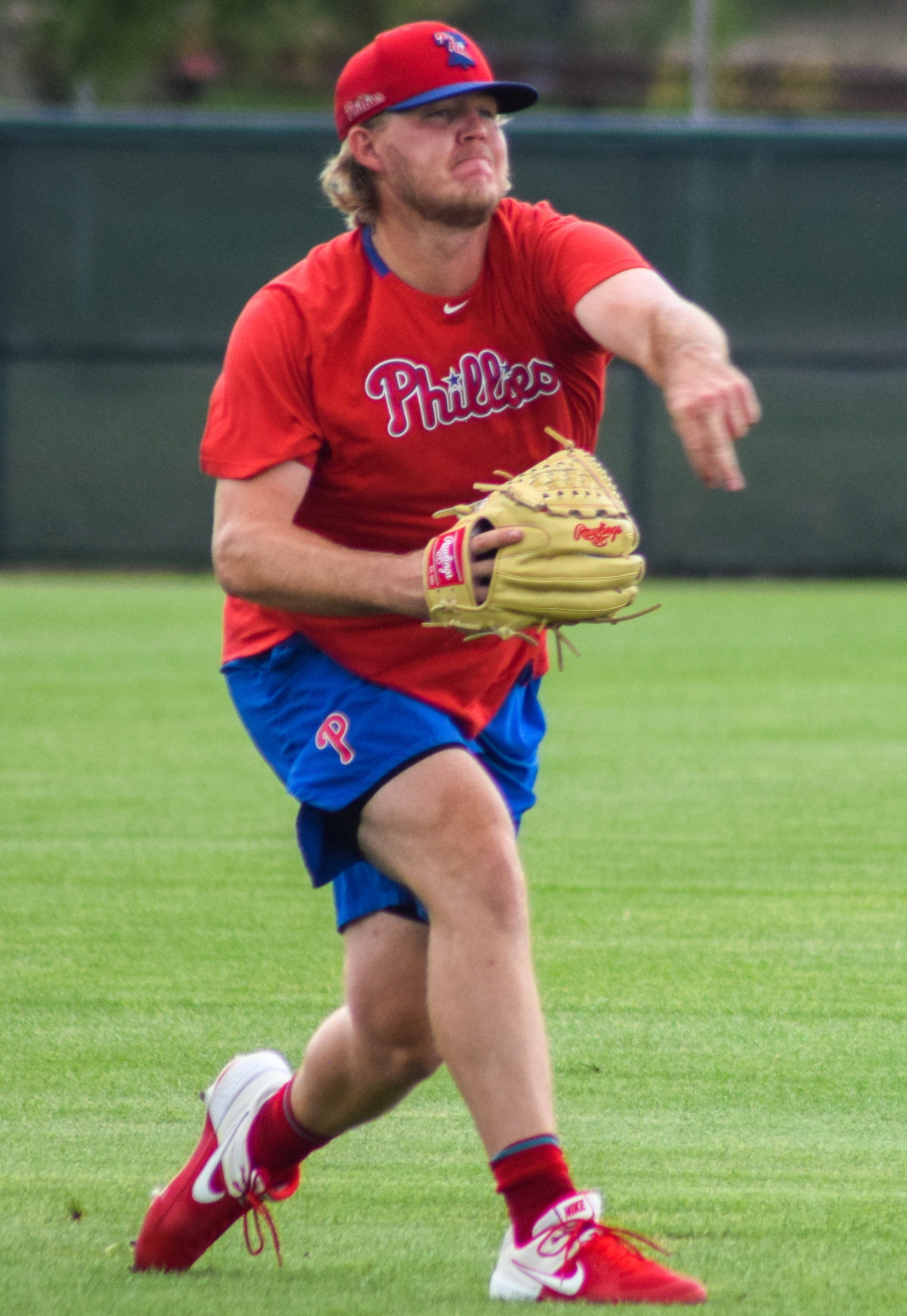
- Cleavinger with the Philadelphia Phillies in 2020

Tampa Bay Rays – No. 60
- Pitcher
- Born: April 23, 1994 (age 32); Lawrence, Kansas, U.S.
- Bats: Right Throws: Left

MLB debut
- September 17, 2020, for the Philadelphia Phillies

MLB statistics (through 2026 season)
- Win–loss record: 17–20
- Earned run average: 3.49
- Strikeouts: 275
- Stats at Baseball Reference

Teams
- Philadelphia Phillies (2020); Los Angeles Dodgers (2021–2022); Tampa Bay Rays (2022–present)
Medals
Men's baseball
Representing United States
World Baseball Classic
Silver medal – second place	2026 Miami	Team

Garrett J. Cleavinger (born April 23, 1994) is an American professional baseball pitcher for the Tampa Bay Rays of Major League Baseball (MLB). He has previously played in MLB for the Philadelphia Phillies and Los Angeles Dodgers.

== Amateur career ==
Cleavinger attended Lawrence High School in Lawrence, Kansas, graduating in 2012. As a senior, he was first-team all-state, first-team All-Sunflower League, first-team all-area, Player of the Year, and named a Central Region All-American by Perfect Game.

Cleavinger attended the University of Oregon and played college baseball for the Oregon Ducks. He served as the closer for the Ducks in 2015. As a freshman in 2013, Cleavinger was 9–0 with a 1.24 ERA (2nd in the Pac-12 Conference) and two saves in 37 relief appearances (4th in the conference), and struck out 57 batters in 43 2/3 innings (averaging 11.7 strikeouts/9 innings, 4th-best in the conference). He set an Oregon freshman records for appearances and earned run average (ERA), and held opposing batters to a .137 batting average (the lowest single-season mark by an Oregon pitcher in school history). Cleavinger was named a freshman All-American by Louisville Slugger and the NCBWA (2nd Team). In 2014, he was 3–2 with two saves and a 3.34 ERA in 35 relief appearances (leading the conference) while striking out 13.6 batters/9 IP (also leading the conference). In 2013 and 2014, Cleavinger played collegiate summer baseball with the Falmouth Commodores of the Cape Cod Baseball League. In 2015, he was 6–2 with 9 saves (5th in the conference) and a 1.58 ERA in 37 relief appearances (5th), while leading the conference with 14.9 strikeouts/9 innings and allowing 4.5 hits/9 innings (4th). Cleavinger played for the Ducks alongside future Phillies teammate, pitcher Cole Irvin.

== Professional career ==
=== Baltimore Orioles ===
The Baltimore Orioles selected Cleavinger in the third round of the 2015 MLB draft, and he made his professional debut with the Aberdeen IronBirds, posting a 6–1 record with a 2.19 ERA in 19 games. Cleavinger spent 2016 with the Delmarva Shorebirds and the Frederick Keys, going a combined 7–3 with a 3.07 ERA in a career-high 76 1/3 innings pitched. He was a 2016 South Atlantic League (SAL) Mid-Season All-Star. Cleavinger started 2017 with the Bowie Baysox.

=== Philadelphia Phillies ===
On July 28, 2017, the Orioles traded Cleavinger and Hyun-soo Kim to the Philadelphia Phillies in exchange for Jeremy Hellickson. The Phillies assigned Cleavinger to the Reading Fightin Phils. In 38 total games between Bowie and Reading in 2017, he posted a 2–5 record, a 6.00 ERA, and 59 strikeouts, in 54 innings. In 2018, between Clearwater and Reading, Cleavinger was 1–1 with a 7.43 ERA, and 18 strikeouts in 13 1/3 innings.

Cleavinger returned to Reading to begin 2019. There, he was 3–2 with a 4.35 ERA in 51 2/3 innings, as he had the worst walks/9 innings ratio in the Eastern League (5.9), the 4th-best strikeouts/9 innings ratio (14.5), and the 6th-best hits/9 innings ratio (5.6). Cleavinger was added to the Phillies 40–man roster following the 2019 season.

Cleavinger was first called up by the Phillies on September 8, 2020, but did not pitch before being sent back down. Then, on September 15, he was promoted to the major leagues for the second time. Cleavinger made his MLB debut on September 17, against the New York Mets, at Citizens Bank Park.

=== Los Angeles Dodgers ===
On December 29, 2020, Cleavinger was traded to the Los Angeles Dodgers as part of a three-team trade that sent José Alvarado to the Phillies and minor leaguer Dillon Paulson and a player to be named later to the Tampa Bay Rays. On May 11, 2021, Cleavinger recorded his first career major league victory against the Seattle Mariners. He pitched in 22 games for the Dodgers, with a 2–4 record and 3.00 ERA.

=== Tampa Bay Rays ===
On August 1, 2022, Cleavinger was traded to the Tampa Bay Rays in exchange for minor leaguer German Tapia. He logged 13 appearances for Tampa Bay to close out the year, posting a 2.41 ERA with 25 strikeouts in 18.2 innings pitched.

In 2023, Cleavinger worked out of Tampa Bay's bullpen, pitching in 15 games and recording a 3.00 ERA with 14 strikeouts in 12.0 innings of work. In a May 7 appearance against the New York Yankees, Cleavinger suffered a knee injury after tagging Aaron Hicks out in a rundown. The following day, he was diagnosed with a torn ACL, an injury likely to end his season.

== Personal life ==
Cleavinger's uncle Matt McWilliams played in the Atlanta Braves organization.
