= David Festa =

American baseball player (born 2000)

Minnesota Twins – No. 58
- Pitcher
- Born: March 8, 2000 (age 26); Verona, New Jersey, U.S.
- Bats: Right Throws: Right

MLB debut
- June 27, 2024, for the Minnesota Twins

MLB statistics (through 2025 season)
- Win–loss record: 5–10
- Earned run average: 5.12
- Strikeouts: 130
- Stats at Baseball Reference

Teams
- Minnesota Twins (2024–2025)

David Festa (born March 8, 2000) is an American professional baseball pitcher for the Minnesota Twins of Major League Baseball (MLB).

== Career ==
Festa attended Seton Hall Preparatory School in West Orange, New Jersey and played college baseball at Seton Hall University. He was drafted by the Minnesota Twins in the 13th round of the 2021 Major League Baseball draft. Festa spent his first professional season with the rookie–level Florida Complex League Twins and Single–A Fort Myers Mighty Mussels.

Festa started 2022 with Fort Myers before being promoted to the High–A Cedar Rapids Kernels. He made 21 appearances (18 starts) between the two affiliates, accumulating a 9–4 record and 2.43 ERA with 108 strikeouts across 103 2/3 innings pitched. Festa split the 2023 campaign between the Double–A Wichita Wind Surge and Triple–A St. Paul Saints, compiling a 4.19 ERA with 119 strikeouts over 24 games (22 starts).

Festa began the 2024 season with Triple–A St. Paul. On June 27, 2024, Festa was promoted to the major leagues for the first time. He made his MLB debut that day against the Arizona Diamondbacks, allowing 5 runs with 2 strikeouts in 5 innings pitched. Festa made 14 appearances (13 starts) for Minnesota during his rookie campaign, logging a 2-6 record and 4.90 ERA with 77 strikeouts across 64 1/3 innings pitched.

Festa was optioned to Triple-A St. Paul to begin the 2025 season. He made 11 appearances (10 starts) for Minnesota, compiling a 3-4 record and 5.40 ERA with 53 strikeouts across 53 1/3 innings pitched. On September 2, 2025, it was announced that Festa would miss the remainder of the season due to a shoulder injury.

On April 2, 2026, Festa was placed on the 60-day injured list due to a triceps strain and shoulder impingement. On July 19, it was reported that he was in danger of missing the entirety of the regular season. On July 28, it was announced that Festa would undergo shoulder and pectoral surgeries, formally ending his season; the surgeries were required to address the shoulder impingement and neurogenic thoracic outlet syndrome.
