= 2027 Baltimore Orioles season =

Major League Baseball team season

2027 Baltimore Orioles
- League: American League
- Division: East
- Ballpark: Oriole Park at Camden Yards
- City: Baltimore, Maryland
- Owner: David Rubenstein
- President of baseball operations: Mike Elias
- General manager: Jared Banner
- Manager: Craig Albernaz
- Television: MASN (Kevin Brown, Scott Garceau, Ben Wagner, Brett Hollander, Melanie Newman, Jim Palmer, Brian Roberts, Brad Brach, Dave Johnson, Ben McDonald, Mike Devereaux, Rob Long)
- Radio: WBAL-AM; Baltimore Orioles Radio Network (Geoff Arnold, Brett Hollander, Scott Garceau, Ben Wagner, Kevin Brown, Ben Mcdonald, Melanie Newman)

The 2027 Baltimore Orioles season is scheduled to be the 127th season in Baltimore Orioles franchise history, the 74th in Baltimore, and the 36th at Oriole Park at Camden Yards.

The season is contingent on Major League Baseball (MLB) and the Major League Baseball Players Association (MLBPA) signing a new collective bargaining agreement (CBA). Without a new CBA, MLB is expected to lock out the players on December 2, 2026, until one is signed. If such a lockout extends indefinitely, the season could be postponed, shortened, or even cancelled.

== Game log ==
The 2027 schedule is tentative until a new collective bargaining agreement (CBA) is signed between Major League Baseball (MLB) and the Major League Baseball Players Association (MLBPA). If the labor dispute extends into late February or early March, MLB would then start to consider whether to postpone or shorten the season.

Past games legend
Orioles Win (#bfb)	Orioles Loss (#fbb)	Game postponed (#bbb)
Bold denotes an Orioles pitcher

2027 Baltimore Orioles Season Game Log: 0–0 (Home: 0–0; Away: 0–0)
March/April: 0–0 (Home: 0–0; Away: 0–0)

#	Date	Opponent	Score	Win	Loss	Save	Stadium	Attendance	Record	Streak/ Box
1	March 25	@ Rays	—	—	—	—	Tropicana Field	—	–	—
2	March 26	@ Rays	—	—	—	—	Tropicana Field	—	–	—
3	March 27	@ Rays	—	—	—	—	Tropicana Field	—	–	—
4	March 29	Blue Jays	—	—	—	—	**Camden Yards**	—	–	—
5	March 31	Blue Jays	—	—	—	—	**Camden Yards**	—	–	—
6	April 1	Blue Jays	—	—	—	—	**Camden Yards**	—	–	—
7	April 2	Tigers	—	—	—	—	**Camden Yards**	—	–	—
8	April 3	Tigers	—	—	—	—	**Camden Yards**	—	–	—
9	April 4	Tigers	—	—	—	—	**Camden Yards**	—	–	—
10	April 5	@ White Sox	—	—	—	—	Rate Field	—	–	—
11	April 6	@ White Sox	—	—	—	—	Rate Field	—	–	—
12	April 7	@ White Sox	—	—	—	—	Rate Field	—	–	—
13	April 9	Angels	—	—	—	—	**Camden Yards**	—	–	—
14	April 10	Angels	—	—	—	—	**Camden Yards**	—	–	—
15	April 11	Angels	—	—	—	—	**Camden Yards**	—	–	—
16	April 12	Angels	—	—	—	—	**Camden Yards**	—	–	—
17	April 13	@ Giants	—	—	—	—	Oracle Park	—	–	—
18	April 14	@ Giants	—	—	—	—	Oracle Park	—	–	—
19	April 15	@ Giants	—	—	—	—	Oracle Park	—	–	—
20	April 16	@ Angels	—	—	—	—	Angel Stadium	—	–	—
21	April 17	@ Angels	—	—	—	—	Angel Stadium	—	–	—
22	April 18	@ Angels	—	—	—	—	Angel Stadium	—	–	—
23	April 20	Royals	—	—	—	—	**Camden Yards**	—	–	—
24	April 21	Royals	—	—	—	—	**Camden Yards**	—	–	—
25	April 22	Royals	—	—	—	—	**Camden Yards**	—	–	—
26	April 23	Marlins	—	—	—	—	**Camden Yards**	—	–	—
27	April 24	Marlins	—	—	—	—	**Camden Yards**	—	–	—
28	April 25	Marlins	—	—	—	—	**Camden Yards**	—	–	—
29	April 27	Red Sox	—	—	—	—	**Camden Yards**	—	–	—
30	April 28	Red Sox	—	—	—	—	**Camden Yards**	—	–	—
31	April 30	@ Padres	—	—	—	—	Petco Park	—	–	—

May: 0–0 (Home: 0–0; Away: 0–0)

#	Date	Opponent	Score	Win	Loss	Save	Stadium	Attendance	Record	Streak/ Box
32	May 1	@ Padres	—	—	—	—	Petco Park	—	–	—
33	May 2	@ Padres	—	—	—	—	Petco Park	—	–	—
34	May 3	@ Diamondbacks	—	—	—	—	Chase Field	—	–	—
35	May 4	@ Diamondbacks	—	—	—	—	Chase Field	—	–	—
36	May 5	@ Diamondbacks	—	—	—	—	Chase Field	—	–	—
37	May 7	White Sox	—	—	—	—	**Camden Yards**	—	–	—
38	May 8	White Sox	—	—	—	—	**Camden Yards**	—	–	—
39	May 9	White Sox	—	—	—	—	**Camden Yards**	—	–	—
40	May 10	Yankees	—	—	—	—	**Camden Yards**	—	–	—
41	May 11	Yankees	—	—	—	—	**Camden Yards**	—	–	—
42	May 12	Yankees	—	—	—	—	**Camden Yards**	—	–	—
43	May 13	Yankees	—	—	—	—	**Camden Yards**	—	–	—
44	May 14	@ Blue Jays	—	—	—	—	Rogers Centre	—	–	—
45	May 15	@ Blue Jays	—	—	—	—	Rogers Centre	—	–	—
46	May 16	@ Blue Jays	—	—	—	—	Rogers Centre	—	–	—
47	May 17	@ Blue Jays	—	—	—	—	Rogers Centre	—	–	—
48	May 18	Cardinals	—	—	—	—	**Camden Yards**	—	–	—
49	May 19	Cardinals	—	—	—	—	**Camden Yards**	—	–	—
50	May 20	Cardinals	—	—	—	—	**Camden Yards**	—	–	—
51	May 21	@ Guardians	—	—	—	—	Progressive Field	—	–	—
52	May 22	@ Guardians	—	—	—	—	Progressive Field	—	–	—
53	May 23	@ Guardians	—	—	—	—	Progressive Field	—	–	—
54	May 25	@ Nationals	—	—	—	—	Nationals Park	—	–	—
55	May 26	@ Nationals	—	—	—	—	Nationals Park	—	–	—
56	May 27	@ Nationals	—	—	—	—	Nationals Park	—	–	—
57	May 28	Rockies	—	—	—	—	**Camden Yards**	—	–	—
58	May 29	Rockies	—	—	—	—	**Camden Yards**	—	–	—
59	May 30	Rockies	—	—	—	—	**Camden Yards**	—	–	—
60	May 31	Mets	—	—	—	—	**Camden Yards**	—	–	—

June: 0–0 (Home: 0–0; Away: 0–0)

#	Date	Opponent	Score	Win	Loss	Save	Stadium	Attendance	Record	Streak/ Box
61	June 1	Mets	—	—	—	—	**Camden Yards**	—	–	—
62	June 2	Mets	—	—	—	—	**Camden Yards**	—	–	—
63	June 4	@ Phillies	—	—	—	—	Citizens Bank Park	—	–	—
64	June 5	@ Phillies	—	—	—	—	Citizens Bank Park	—	–	—
65	June 6	@ Phillies	—	—	—	—	Citizens Bank Park	—	–	—
66	June 8	@ Yankees	—	—	—	—	Yankee Stadium	—	–	—
67	June 9	@ Yankees	—	—	—	—	Yankee Stadium	—	–	—
68	June 10	@ Yankees	—	—	—	—	Yankee Stadium	—	–	—
69	June 11	Rays	—	—	—	—	**Camden Yards**	—	–	—
70	June 12	Rays	—	—	—	—	**Camden Yards**	—	–	—
71	June 13	Rays	—	—	—	—	**Camden Yards**	—	–	—
72	June 14	Rays	—	—	—	—	**Camden Yards**	—	–	—
73	June 15	Guardians	—	—	—	—	**Camden Yards**	—	–	—
74	June 16	Guardians	—	—	—	—	**Camden Yards**	—	–	—
75	June 17	Guardians	—	—	—	—	**Camden Yards**	—	–	—
76	June 18	@ Rangers	—	—	—	—	Globe Life Field	—	–	—
77	June 19	@ Rangers	—	—	—	—	Globe Life Field	—	–	—
78	June 20	@ Rangers	—	—	—	—	Globe Life Field	—	–	—
79	June 21	@ Royals	—	—	—	—	Kauffman Stadium	—	–	—
80	June 22	@ Royals	—	—	—	—	Kauffman Stadium	—	–	—
81	June 23	@ Royals	—	—	—	—	Kauffman Stadium	—	–	—
82	June 25	Rangers	—	—	—	—	**Camden Yards**	—	–	—
83	June 26	Rangers	—	—	—	—	**Camden Yards**	—	–	—
84	June 27	Rangers	—	—	—	—	**Camden Yards**	—	–	—
85	June 29	Athletics	—	—	—	—	**Camden Yards**	—	–	—
86	June 30	Athletics	—	—	—	—	**Camden Yards**	—	–	—

July: 0–0 (Home: 0–0; Away: 0–0)

#	Date	Opponent	Score	Win	Loss	Save	Stadium	Attendance	Record	Streak/ Box
87	July 1	Athletics	—	—	—	—	**Camden Yards**	—	–	—
88	July 2	@ Red Sox	—	—	—	—	Fenway Park	—	–	—
89	July 3	@ Red Sox	—	—	—	—	Fenway Park	—	–	—
90	July 4	@ Red Sox	—	—	—	—	Fenway Park	—	–	—
91	July 5	@ Tigers	—	—	—	—	Fifth Third Park	—	–	—
92	July 6	@ Tigers	—	—	—	—	Fifth Third Park	—	–	—
93	July 7	@ Tigers	—	—	—	—	Fifth Third Park	—	–	—
94	July 8	@ Tigers	—	—	—	—	Fifth Third Park	—	–	—
95	July 9	@ Rays	—	—	—	—	Tropicana Field	—	–	—
96	July 10	@ Rays	—	—	—	—	Tropicana Field	—	–	—
97	July 11	@ Rays	—	—	—	—	Tropicana Field	—	–	—
ASG	July 13	AL @ NL	—	—	—	—	Wrigley Field	—	—	―
98	July 16	Nationals	—	—	—	—	**Camden Yards**	—	–	—
99	July 17	Nationals	—	—	—	—	**Camden Yards**	—	–	—
100	July 18	Nationals	—	—	—	—	**Camden Yards**	—	–	—
101	July 19	Astros	—	—	—	—	**Camden Yards**	—	–	—
102	July 20	Astros	—	—	—	—	**Camden Yards**	—	–	—
103	July 21	Astros	—	—	—	—	**Camden Yards**	—	–	—
104	July 22	Red Sox	—	—	—	—	**Camden Yards**	—	–	—
105	July 23	Red Sox	—	—	—	—	**Camden Yards**	—	–	—
106	July 24	Red Sox	—	—	—	—	**Camden Yards**	—	–	—
107	July 25	Red Sox	—	—	—	—	**Camden Yards**	—	–	—
108	July 27	@ Athletics	—	—	—	—	Sutter Health Park	—	–	—
109	July 28	@ Athletics	—	—	—	—	Sutter Health Park	—	–	—
110	July 29	@ Athletics	—	—	—	—	Sutter Health Park	—	–	—
111	July 30	@ Mariners	—	—	—	—	T-Mobile Park	—	–	—
112	July 31	@ Mariners	—	—	—	—	T-Mobile Park	—	–	—

August: 0–0 (Home: 0–0; Away: 0–0)

#	Date	Opponent	Score	Win	Loss	Save	Stadium	Attendance	Record	Streak/ Box
113	August 1	@ Mariners	—	—	—	—	T-Mobile Park	—	–	—
114	August 3	Blue Jays	—	—	—	—	**Camden Yards**	—	–	—
115	August 4	Blue Jays	—	—	—	—	**Camden Yards**	—	–	—
116	August 5	Blue Jays	—	—	—	—	**Camden Yards**	—	–	—
117	August 6	Pirates	—	—	—	—	**Camden Yards**	—	–	—
118	August 7	Pirates	—	—	—	—	**Camden Yards**	—	–	—
119	August 8	Pirates	—	—	—	—	**Camden Yards**	—	–	—
120	August 10	@ Astros	—	—	—	—	Daikin Park	—	–	—
121	August 11	@ Astros	—	—	—	—	Daikin Park	—	–	—
122	August 12	@ Astros	—	—	—	—	Daikin Park	—	–	—
123	August 13	@ Braves	—	—	—	—	Truist Park	—	–	—
124	August 14	@ Braves	—	—	—	—	Truist Park	—	–	—
125	August 15	@ Braves	—	—	—	—	Truist Park	—	–	—
126	August 16	@ Yankees	—	—	—	—	Yankee Stadium	—	–	—
127	August 17	@ Yankees	—	—	—	—	Yankee Stadium	—	–	—
128	August 18	@ Yankees	—	—	—	—	Yankee Stadium	—	–	—
129	August 20	Dodgers	—	—	—	—	**Camden Yards**	—	–	—
130	August 21	Dodgers	—	—	—	—	**Camden Yards**	—	–	—
131	August 22	Dodgers	—	—	—	—	**Camden Yards**	—	–	—
132	August 23	Twins	—	—	—	—	**Camden Yards**	—	–	—
133	August 24	Twins	—	—	—	—	**Camden Yards**	—	–	—
134	August 25	Twins	—	—	—	—	**Camden Yards**	—	–	—
135	August 27	@ Blue Jays	—	—	—	—	Rogers Centre	—	–	—
136	August 28	@ Blue Jays	—	—	—	—	Rogers Centre	—	–	—
137	August 29	@ Blue Jays	—	—	—	—	Rogers Centre	—	–	—
138	August 30	@ Red Sox	—	—	—	—	Fenway Park	—	–	—
139	August 31	@ Red Sox	—	—	—	—	Fenway Park	—	–	—

September: 0–0 (Home: 0–0; Away: 0–0)

#	Date	Opponent	Score	Win	Loss	Save	Stadium	Attendance	Record	Streak/ Box
140	September 1	@ Red Sox	—	—	—	—	Fenway Park	—	–	—
141	September 2	@ Red Sox	—	—	—	—	Fenway Park	—	–	—
142	September 3	@ Twins	—	—	—	—	Target Field	—	–	—
143	September 4	@ Twins	—	—	—	—	Target Field	—	–	—
144	September 5	@ Twins	—	—	—	—	Target Field	—	–	—
145	September 6	Rays	—	—	—	—	**Camden Yards**	—	–	—
146	September 7	Rays	—	—	—	—	**Camden Yards**	—	–	—
147	September 8	Rays	—	—	—	—	**Camden Yards**	—	–	—
148	September 10	Mariners	—	—	—	—	**Camden Yards**	—	–	—
149	September 11	Mariners	—	—	—	—	**Camden Yards**	—	–	—
150	September 12	Mariners	—	—	—	—	**Camden Yards**	—	–	—
151	September 14	@ Cubs	—	—	—	—	Wrigley Field	—	–	—
152	September 15	@ Cubs	—	—	—	—	Wrigley Field	—	–	—
153	September 16	@ Cubs	—	—	—	—	Wrigley Field	—	–	—
154	September 17	@ Brewers	—	—	—	—	American Family Field	—	–	—
155	September 18	@ Brewers	—	—	—	—	American Family Field	—	–	—
156	September 19	@ Brewers	—	—	—	—	American Family Field	—	–	—
157	September 21	Reds	—	—	—	—	**Camden Yards**	—	–	—
158	September 22	Reds	—	—	—	—	**Camden Yards**	—	–	—
159	September 23	Reds	—	—	—	—	**Camden Yards**	—	–	—
160	September 24	Yankees	—	—	—	—	**Camden Yards**	—	–	—
161	September 25	Yankees	—	—	—	—	**Camden Yards**	—	–	—
162	September 26	Yankees	—	—	—	—	**Camden Yards**	—	–	—

== Current roster ==
Baltimore Orioles 2027 spring training roster
40-man roster		Non-roster invitees	Coaches / other
Pitchers: 74 Félix Bautista; 34 Shane Baz; 38 Kyle Bradish; -- Braxton Bragg; 78 Yennier Canó; 81 Luis De León; -- Michael Forret; 50 Rico Garcia; -- Nestor German; 43 Trey Gibson; 21 Ryan Helsley; 76 Yaramil Hiraldo; 26 Alex Hoppe; -- Braden Nett; 66 Anthony Nunez; 37 Cade Povich; -- Patrick Reilly; 73 Cam Sanders; 61 Josh Walker; -- Levi Wells; 48 Grant Wolfram; 63 Brandon Young	Catchers: 29 Samuel Basallo; 75 Carlos Narváez; Infielders: 23 Blaze Alexander; 25 Pete Alonso; 32 Christian Encarnacion-Strand; -- Aron Estrada; 2 Gunnar Henderson; 7 Jackson Holliday; 82 Jeremiah Jackson; 16 Coby Mayo; 11 Jordan Westburg; Outfielders: 12 Dylan Beavers; -- Enrique Bradfield; 17 Colton Cowser; 27 Christian Franklin; 9 Tyler O'Neill; 62 Reed Trimble	Pitchers: -- Alex Carrillo; -- Connor Cooke; -- Robinson Martínez; Infielders: -- Jose Barrero; -- Luis Vázquez; Outfielders: -- Junior Pérez	Manager: 55 Craig Albernaz; Coaches: 36 Jason Bourgeois (first base); 46 Buck Britton (third base); 47 Miguel Cairo (infield); 51 Hank Conger (bullpen); 53 Donnie Ecker (bench); 58 Drew French (pitching); 89 Ryan Klimek (pitching strategy); 86 Dustin Lind (hitting); 85 Brady North (assistant hitting); 77 Mitch Plassmeyer (assistant pitching); 87 Joe Singley (field coordinator/catching); 39 active, 0 inactive, 6 non-roster invitees; 7-, 10-, or 15-day injured list; * Not on active roster; ^{†} Suspended list; Roster, coaches, and NRIs updated November 20, 2026; Transactions • Depth chart; → All MLB rosters

== Farm system ==
Level	Team	League	Manager
Triple-A	Norfolk Tides	International League	
Double-A	Chesapeake Baysox	Eastern League	
High-A	Frederick Keys	South Atlantic League	
Low-A	Delmarva Shorebirds	Carolina League	
Rookie	FCL Orioles	Florida Complex League	
Foreign Rookie	DSL Orioles 1	Dominican Summer League	
Foreign Rookie	DSL Orioles 2	Dominican Summer League	
