= 2026 Baltimore Orioles season =

Major League Baseball team season

2026 Baltimore Orioles
- League: American League
- Division: East
- Ballpark: Oriole Park at Camden Yards
- City: Baltimore, Maryland
- Record: 79–82 (.491)
- Divisional place: 4th
- Owner: David Rubenstein
- General manager: Mike Elias
- Manager: Craig Albernaz
- Television: MASN (Kevin Brown, Scott Garceau, Ben Wagner, Brett Hollander, Melanie Newman, Jim Palmer, Brian Roberts, Brad Brach, Dave Johnson, Ben McDonald, Mike Devereaux, Rob Long)
- Radio: WBAL-AM; Baltimore Orioles Radio Network (Geoff Arnold, Brett Hollander, Scott Garceau, Ben Wagner, Kevin Brown, Ben Mcdonald, Melanie Newman)

The 2026 Baltimore Orioles season was the 126th season in Baltimore Orioles franchise history, the 73rd in Baltimore, and the 35th at Oriole Park at Camden Yards.

The Orioles improved upon their 75–87 record from the previous year with a 4–3 win on September 21 against the Toronto Blue Jays. However, they were mathematically eliminated from postseason contention on September 24 following the Chicago White Sox's victory over the Kansas City Royals, failing to qualify for a second year in a row. Due to the September 2026 nor'easter, their game vs. the New York Yankees was rained out after a significant delay, leading to both teams only playing 161 games.

On October 26, 2025, the Orioles hired Craig Albernaz to be their new manager for the 2026 season.

== Regular season ==
=== Regular season standings ===
==== American League East ====
AL East
Team	W	L	Pct.	GB	Home	Road
Tampa Bay Rays	98	64	.605	—	55‍–‍26	43‍–‍38
New York Yankees	93	68	.578	4½	46‍–‍34	47‍–‍34
Boston Red Sox	87	75	.537	11	41‍–‍40	46‍–‍35
Baltimore Orioles	79	82	.491	18½	39‍–‍42	40‍–‍40
Toronto Blue Jays	79	83	.488	19	42‍–‍39	37‍–‍44

==== American League Wild Card ====
Division leaders
Team	W	L	Pct.
Tampa Bay Rays	98	64	.605
Cleveland Guardians	85	77	.525
Houston Astros	81	81	.500

Wild Card teams (Top 3 teams qualify for postseason)
Team	W	L	Pct.	GB
New York Yankees	93	68	.578	+9½
Boston Red Sox	87	75	.537	+3
Chicago White Sox	84	78	.519	—
Texas Rangers	80	82	.494	4
Baltimore Orioles	79	82	.491	4½
Toronto Blue Jays	79	83	.488	5
Minnesota Twins	77	85	.475	7
Detroit Tigers	76	86	.469	8
Seattle Mariners	76	86	.469	8
Kansas City Royals	69	93	.426	15
Athletics	64	98	.395	20
Los Angeles Angels	62	100	.383	22

==== Record vs. opponents ====
===== Record vs. American League =====
2026 American League record Source: MLB Standings Grid – 2026
Team	ATH	BAL	BOS	CWS	CLE	DET	HOU	KC	LAA	MIN	NYY	SEA	TB	TEX	TOR	NL
Athletics	—	2–4	3–4	1–5	1–5	0–6	6–7	2–5	8–5	3–3	3–3	7–6	0–6	7–6	2–4	19–29
Baltimore	4–2	—	4–9	4–2	3–4	4–2	5–1	5–1	3–3	3–3	3–9	3–4	8–5	2–4	7–6	21–27
Boston	4–3	9–4	—	6–0	3–3	5–2	1–5	5–1	4–2	1–5	6–7	3–3	6–7	3–3	4–9	27–21
Chicago	5–1	2–4	0–6	—	7–6	9–4	2–5	9–4	4–2	8–5	3–4	3–3	2–4	4–2	5–1	21–27
Cleveland	5–1	4–3	3–3	6–7	—	10–3	2–4	7–6	6–0	6–7	2–4	4–3	1–5	2–4	2–4	25–23
Detroit	6–0	2–4	2–5	4–9	3–10	—	2–5	6–7	3–3	5–8	4–2	4–2	4–2	4–2	3–3	24–24
Houston	7–6	1–5	5–1	5–2	4–2	5–2	—	4–2	7–6	2–4	3–3	3–10	2–4	9–4	3–3	21–27
Kansas City	5–2	1–5	1–5	4–9	6–7	7–6	2–4	—	5–1	8–5	0–6	5–1	2–5	1–5	3–3	19–29
Los Angeles	5–8	3–3	2–4	2–4	0–6	3–3	6–7	1–5	—	3–4	3–4	6–7	3–3	8–5	2–4	15–33
Minnesota	3–3	3–3	5–1	5–8	7–6	8–5	4–2	5–8	4–3	—	3–3	2–4	1–5	5–1	4–3	18–30
New York	3–3	9–3	7–6	4–3	4–2	2–4	3–3	6–0	4–3	3–3	—	4–2	6–7	4–2	7–6	27–21
Seattle	6–7	4–3	3–3	3–3	3–4	2–4	10–3	1–5	7–6	4–2	2–4	—	1–5	5–8	2–4	23–25
Tampa Bay	6–0	5–8	7–6	4–2	5–1	2–4	4–2	5–2	3–3	5–1	7–6	5–1	—	4–3	9–4	27–21
Texas	6–7	4–2	3–3	2–4	4–2	2–4	4–9	5–1	5–8	1–5	2–4	8–5	3–4	—	6–1	25–23
Toronto	4–2	6–7	9–4	1–5	4–2	3–3	3–3	3–3	4–2	3–4	6–7	4–2	4–9	1–6	—	24–24

Updated with the results of all games through September 27, 2026.

===== Record vs. National League =====
2026 American League record vs. National League Source: MLB Standings
Team	AZ	ATL	CHC	CIN	COL	LAD	MIA	MIL	NYM	PHI	PIT	SD	SF	STL	WSH
Athletics	1–2	1–2	2–1	0–3	2–1	1–2	0–3	2–1	3–0	1–2	1–2	1–2	2–4	1–2	1–2
Baltimore	1–2	1–2	1–2	2–1	1–2	2–1	2–1	0–3	3–0	1–2	0–3	1–2	2–1	2–1	2–4
Boston	2–1	2–4	2–1	1–2	1–2	3–0	2–1	2–1	3–0	1–2	1–2	1–2	3–0	2–1	1–2
Chicago	2–1	2–1	3–3	1–2	2–1	2–1	1–2	0–3	2–1	1–2	0–3	2–1	1–2	1–2	1–2
Cleveland	1–2	1–2	2–1	4–2	3–0	2–1	3–0	1–2	0–3	2–1	1–2	1–2	2–1	1–2	1–2
Detroit	1–3	1–2	2–1	1–2	3–0	1–2	3–0	2–1	0–3	1–2	3–3	2–1	2–1	2–1	1–2
Houston	1–2	0–3	3–0	1–2	2–4	1–2	3–0	1–2	2–1	2–1	1–2	1–2	2–1	0–3	1–2
Kansas City	1–2	1–2	1–2	2–1	0–3	0–3	1–2	1–2	1–2	2–1	0–3	2–1	3–0	3–3	1–2
Los Angeles	1–2	1–2	1–2	2–1	1–2	1–5	1–2	1–2	1–2	0–3	1–2	1–2	1–2	2–1	0–3
Minnesota	2–1	3–0	1–2	0–3	2–1	0–3	2–1	2–4	1–2	0–3	0–3	0–3	2–1	2–1	1–2
New York	1–2	2–1	2–1	1–2	3–0	1–2	2–1	0–3	3–3	2–1	2–1	1–2	3–0	1–2	3–0
Seattle	3–0	2–1	2–1	1–2	2–1	1–2	0–3	1–2	2–1	2–1	1–2	0–6	2–1	3–0	1–2
Tampa Bay	3–0	2–1	1–2	1–2	3–0	0–3	3–3	1–2	1–2	2–1	1–2	3–0	3–0	1–2	2–1
Texas	4–2	1–2	2–1	0–3	2–1	1–2	1–2	1–2	1–2	2–1	2–1	2–1	2–1	2–1	2–1
Toronto	1–2	1–2	1–2	2–1	1–2	1–2	2–1	1–2	2–1	3–3	2–1	1–2	2–1	2–1	2–1

Updated with the results of all games through September 27, 2026.

== Game log ==
Past games legend
Orioles Win (#bfb)	Orioles Loss (#fbb)	Game postponed (#bbb)	Eliminated from playoff race (#933)
Bold denotes an Orioles pitcher

2026 Baltimore Orioles Season Game Log: 79–82 (Home: 39–42; Away: 40–40)
March/April: 15–16 (Home: 9–9; Away: 6–7)

#	Date	Opponent	Score	Win	Loss	Save	Stadium	Attendance	Record	Streak/ Box
1	March 26	Twins	2–1	**Rogers** (1–0)	Funderburk (0–1)	**Helsley** (1)	**Camden Yards**	42,134	1–0	W1
2	March 28	Twins	1–4	Banda (1–0)	**Bradish** (0–1)	Sands (1)	**Camden Yards**	26,057	1–1	L1
3	March 29	Twins	8–6	**Garcia** (1–0)	Abel (0–1)	**Helsley** (2)	**Camden Yards**	18,071	2–1	W1
4	March 30	Rangers	2–5	Leiter (1–0)	**Bassitt** (0–1)	Alexander (2)	**Camden Yards**	11,209	2–2	L1
5	March 31	Rangers	5–8	Winn (1–0)	**Canó** (0–1)	—	**Camden Yards**	13,542	2–3	L2
6	April 1	Rangers	8–3	**Rogers** (2–0)	Eovaldi (0–2)	**Suárez** (1)	**Camden Yards**	14,324	3–3	W1
7	April 3	@ Pirates	4–5	Keller (1–0)	**Bradish** (0–2)	Soto (1)	PNC Park	38,986	3–4	L1
8	April 4	@ Pirates	2–3	Santana (2–0)	**Helsley** (0–1)	—	PNC Park	27,949	3–5	L2
9	April 5	@ Pirates	2–8	Ashcraft (1–1)	**Bassitt** (0–2)	—	PNC Park	11,956	3–6	L3
10	April 6	@ White Sox	2–1	**Young** (1–0)	Fedde (0–2)	**Helsley** (3)	Rate Field	17,221	4–6	W1
11	April 7	@ White Sox	4–2	**Canó** (1–1)	Hicks (0–1)	**Helsley** (4)	Rate Field	10,750	5–6	W2
12	April 8	@ White Sox	5–3	**Bradish** (1–2)	Sims (0—1)	**Garcia** (1)	Rate Field	10,133	6–6	W3
13	April 10	Giants	3–6	Roupp (2–1)	**Baz** (0–1)	—	**Camden Yards**	32,294	6–7	L1
14	April 11	Giants	6–2	**Wolfram** (1–0)	Webb (1–2)	—	**Camden Yards**	29,444	7–7	W1
15	April 12	Giants	6–2	**Povich** (1–0)	Houser (0–2)	—	**Camden Yards**	24,091	8–7	W2
16	April 13	Diamondbacks	9–7	**Suárez** (1–0)	Loáisiga (0–1)	**Helsley** (5)	**Camden Yards**	10,289	9–7	W3
17	April 14	Diamondbacks	3–4	Kelly (1–0)	**Rogers** (2–1)	Sewald (6)	**Camden Yards**	13,524	9–8	L1
18	April 15	Diamondbacks	5–8 (10)	Thompson (1–0)	**Wells** (0–1)	Morillo (1)	**Camden Yards**	17,028	9–9	L2
19	April 16	@ Guardians	2–4	Messick (3–0)	**Baz** (0–2)	Smith (4)	Progressive Field	14,748	9–10	L3
20	April 17	@ Guardians	6–4	**Garcia** (2–0)	Sabrowski (0–1)	**Helsley** (6)	Progressive Field	23,988	10–10	W1
21	April 18	@ Guardians	2–4	Williams (3–1)	**Kremer** (0–1)	Smith (5)	Progressive Field	20,783	10–11	L1
22	April 19	@ Guardians	4–8	Festa (1–0)	**Rogers** (2–2)	—	Progressive Field	17,408	10–12	L2
23	April 20	@ Royals	7–5 (12)	**Nunez** (1–0)	Lange (0–2)	—	Kauffman Stadium	13,589	11–12	W1
24	April 21	@ Royals	5–6	Erceg (1–1)	**Helsley** (0–2)	—	Kauffman Stadium	15,164	11–13	L1
25	April 22	@ Royals	8–6	**Bassitt** (1–2)	Wacha (2–1)	**Nunez** (1)	Kauffman Stadium	14,175	12–13	W1
26	April 24	Red Sox	10–3	**Young** (2–0)	Bello (1–3)	—	**Camden Yards**	26,776	13–13	W2
27	April 25	Red Sox	1–17	Crochet (3–3)	**Rogers** (2–3)	—	**Camden Yards**	33,582	13–14	L1
28	April 26	Red Sox	3–5	Early (2–1)	**Bradish** (1–3)	Chapman (5)	**Camden Yards**	32,511	13–15	L2
29	April 28	Astros	5–3	**Baz** (1–2)	Teng (1–2)	**Helsley** (7)	**Camden Yards**	13,233	14–15	W1
―	April 29	Astros	**Postponed (rain)** (Makeup date: April 30)							
30	April 30 (1)	Astros	10–3	**Bassitt** (2–2)	Lambert (1–2)	—	**Camden Yards**	see 2nd game	15–15	W2
31	April 30 (2)	Astros	5–11	McCullers Jr. (2–2)	**Young** (2–1)	—	**Camden Yards**	26,586	15–16	L1

May: 13–16 (Home: 10–6; Away: 3–10)

#	Date	Opponent	Score	Win	Loss	Save	Stadium	Attendance	Record	Streak/ Box
32	May 1	@ Yankees	2–7	Warren (4–0)	**Povich** (1–1	—	Yankee Stadium	41,239	15–17	L2
33	May 2	@ Yankees	4–9	Weathers (2–2)	**Bradish** (1–4)	—	Yankee Stadium	46,049	15–18	L3
34	May 3	@ Yankees	3–11	Cruz (3–0)	**Wolfram** (1–1)	—	Yankee Stadium	43,416	15–19	L4
35	May 4	@ Yankees	1–12	Schlittler (5–1)	**Baz** (1–3)	—	Yankee Stadium	36,802	15–20	L5
36	May 5	@ Marlins	9–7	**Garcia** (3–0)	Nardi (2–2)	—	LoanDepot Park	6,600	16–20	W1
37	May 6	@ Marlins	7–4	**Young** (3–1)	Pérez (2–4)	**Garcia** (2)	LoanDepot Park	6,607	17–20	W2
38	May 7	@ Marlins	3–4	Faucher (3–2)	**Kittredge** (0–1)	—	LoanDepot Park	8,588	17–21	L1
39	May 8	Athletics	3–4	Lopez (3–2)	**Bradish** (1–5)	Harris (2)	**Camden Yards**	39,311	17–22	L2
40	May 9	Athletics	2–6	Civale (4–1)	**Baz** (1–4)	—	**Camden Yards**	30,707	17–23	L3
41	May 10	Athletics	2–1	**Bassitt** (3–2)	Severino (2–4)	**Garcia** (3)	**Camden Yards**	24,213	18–23	W1
42	May 11	Yankees	3–2	**Enns** (1–0)	Headrick (3–1)	**Nunez** (2)	**Camden Yards**	23,160	19–23	W2
43	May 12	Yankees	2–6	Warren (5–1)	**Rogers** (2–4)	—	**Camden Yards**	20,344	19–24	L1
44	May 13	Yankees	7–0	**Bradish** (2–5)	Fried (4–3)	—	**Camden Yards**	14,521	20–24	W1
45	May 15	@ Nationals	2–3	Littell (2–4)	**Baz** (1–5)	Lovelady (2)	Nationals Park	38,912	20–25	L1
46	May 16	@ Nationals	3–13	Cavalli (2–2)	**Bassitt** (3–3)	—	Nationals Park	40,559	20–26	L2
47	May 17	@ Nationals	7–3	**Nunez** (2–0)	Lovelady (2–2)	—	Nationals Park	26,715	21–26	W1
48	May 18	@ Rays	6–16	McClanahan (5–2)	**Rogers** (2–5)	—	Tropicana Field	13,633	21–27	L1
49	May 19	@ Rays	1–4	Kelly (3–1)	**Bradish** (2–6)	Baker (13)	Tropicana Field	13,956	21–28	L2
50	May 20	@ Rays	3–5	Scholtens (5–2)	**Nunez** (2–1)	Seymour (2)	Tropicana Field	11,846	21–29	L3
51	May 22	Tigers	7–4	**Bassitt** (4–3)	Flaherty (0–6)	**Nunez** (3)	**Camden Yards**	14,956	22–29	W1
―	May 23	Tigers	**Postponed (rain)** (Makeup date: May 24)							
52	May 24 (1)	Tigers	5–3	**Enns** (2–0)	Jansen (1–3)	—	**Camden Yards**	17,616	23–29	W2
53	May 24 (2)	Tigers	1–4	Melton (1–0)	**Rogers** (2–6)	Anderson (2)	**Camden Yards**	19,735	23–30	L1
54	May 25	Rays	9–7 (13)	**Enns** (3–0)	Scholtens (5–3)	—	**Camden Yards**	22,388	24–30	W1
55	May 26	Rays	6–1	**Baz** (2–5)	Jax (1–3)	—	**Camden Yards**	11,878	25–30	W2
56	May 27	Rays	11–2	**Gibson** (1–0)	Matz (4–2)	—	**Camden Yards**	16,317	26–30	W3
57	May 28	Blue Jays	1–2	Hoffman (4–3)	**Nunez** (2–3)	Varland (8)	**Camden Yards**	13,778	26–31	L1
58	May 29	Blue Jays	5–6	Fluharty (3–0)	**Canó** (1–2)	Fisher (1)	**Camden Yards**	25,494	26–32	L2
59	May 30	Blue Jays	6–5	**Suárez** (2–0)	Hoffman (4–4)	—	**Camden Yards**	32,645	27–32	W1
60	May 31	Blue Jays	9–5	**Bradish** (3–6)	Miles (2–1)	—	**Camden Yards**	34,476	28–32	W2

June: 11–16 (Home: 4–8; Away: 7–8)

#	Date	Opponent	Score	Win	Loss	Save	Stadium	Attendance	Record	Streak/ Box
61	June 2	@ Red Sox	4–2	**Baz** (3–5)	Early (5–3)	**Garcia** (4)	Fenway Park	35,004	29–32	W3
62	June 3	@ Red Sox	1–8	Tolle (3–2)	**Bassitt** (4–4)	Watson (1)	Fenway Park	36,872	29–33	L1
63	June 4	@ Red Sox	8–2	**Rogers** (3–6)	Bello (2–6)	—	Fenway Park	33,180	30–33	W1
64	June 5	@ Blue Jays	13–3	**Young** (4–1)	Yesavage (2–3)	—	Rogers Centre	41,801	31–33	W2
65	June 6	@ Blue Jays	4–6	Miles (3–1)	**Bradish** (3–7)	Varland (10)	Rogers Centre	41,868	31–34	L1
66	June 7	@ Blue Jays	4–6	Macko (2–0)	**Baz** (3–6)	Varland (11)	Rogers Centre	41,278	31–35	L2
67	June 8	Mariners	3–6	Hancock (5–2)	**Gibson** (1–1)	Muñoz (10)	**Camden Yards**	12,377	31–36	L3
68	June 9	Mariners	5–6 (10)	Ferrer (1–1)	**Garcia** (3–1)	Davila (1)	**Camden Yards**	14,728	31–37	L4
69	June 10	Mariners	7–2	**Young** (5–1)	Kirby (5–6)	—	**Camden Yards**	13,483	32–37	W1
70	June 11	Mariners	7–5	**Wells** (1–1)	Woo (5–5)	**Kittredge** (1)	**Camden Yards**	15,776	33–37	W2
71	June 12	Padres	7–3	**Baz** (4–6)	Canning (0–5)	—	**Camden Yards**	25,458	34–37	W3
72	June 13	Padres	3–9	Vásquez (6–4)	**Gibson** (1–2)	—	**Camden Yards**	25,722	34–38	L1
73	June 14	Padres	2–5	Buehler (4–3)	**Rogers** (3–7)	Miller (19)	**Camden Yards**	20,611	34–39	L2
74	June 16	@ Mariners	1–3	Gilbert (5–4)	**Young** (5–2)	Muñoz (11)	T-Mobile Park	27,396	34–40	L3
75	June 17	@ Mariners	5–3	**Bradish** (4–7)	Kirby (5–7)	—	T-Mobile Park	28,068	35–40	W1
76	June 18	@ Mariners	0–3	Woo (6–5)	**Baz** (4–7)	Muñoz (12)	T-Mobile Park	43,053	35–41	L1
77	June 19	@ Dodgers	5–6	Treinen (4–1)	**Helsley** (0–3)	—	Dodger Stadium	51,939	35–42	L2
78	June 20	@ Dodgers	3–2	**Rogers** (4–7)	Yamamoto (7–5)	**Canó** (1)	Dodger Stadium	50,538	36–42	W1
79	June 21	@ Dodgers	12–1	**Young** (6–2)	Sheehan (3–5)	—	Dodger Stadium	50,215	37–42	W2
80	June 22	@ Angels	6–1	**Bradish** (5–7)	Aldegheri (2–3)	—	Angel Stadium	28,431	38–42	W3
81	June 23	@ Angels	1–5	Johnson (1–2)	**Baz** (4–8)	—	Angel Stadium	31,569	38–43	L1
82	June 24	@ Angels	6–7 (10)	Silseth (3–1)	**Akin** (0–1)	—	Angel Stadium	27,585	38–44	L2
83	June 26	Nationals	3–1	**Rogers** (5–7)	Alvarez (1–1)	**Helsley** (8)	**Camden Yards**	26,901	39–44	W1
84	June 27	Nationals	3–4 (10)	Beeter (3–1)	**Helsley** (0–4)	Lawrence (1)	**Camden Yards**	29,616	39–45	L1
85	June 28	Nationals	4–6	Littell (7–6)	**Bradish** (5–8)	Poulin (3)	**Camden Yards**	27,626	39–46	L2
86	June 29	White Sox	2–8	Taylor (4–1)	**Wolfram** (1–2)	—	**Camden Yards**	17,146	39–47	L3
87	June 30	White Sox	3–9	Fedde (3–6)	**Gibson** (1–3)	Schweitzer (1)	**Camden Yards**	17,581	39–48	L4

July: 15–8 (Home: 7–4; Away: 8–4)

#	Date	Opponent	Score	Win	Loss	Save	Stadium	Attendance	Record	Streak/ Box
88	July 1	White Sox	6–1	**Kremer** (1–1)	Schultz (2–5)	—	**Camden Yards**	19,045	40–48	W1
89	July 3	@ Reds	3–0	**Rogers** (6–7)	Singer (3–8)	**Wells** (1)	Great American Ball Park	22,157	41–48	W2
90	July 4	@ Reds	8–5	**Young** (7–2)	Greene (0–1)	**Wells** (2)	Great American Ball Park	33,047	42–48	W3
91	July 5	@ Reds	2–3	Lodolo (3–2)	**Bradish** (5–9)	Pagán (7)	Great American Ball Park	17,601	42–49	W4
92	July 7	Cubs	2–5	Boyd (4–1)	**Baz** (4–9)	Thornton (2)	**Camden Yards**	16,200	42–50	L1
93	July 8	Cubs	7–9	Rea (7–5)	**Kremer** (1–2)	Webb (4)	**Camden Yards**	18,935	42–51	L2
94	July 9	Cubs	3–2	**Wells** (2–1)	Ferguson (0–1)	**Kittredge** (2)	**Camden Yards**	12,052	43–51	W1
95	July 10	Royals	5–3	**Garcia** (4–1)	Strahm (3–2)	**Kittredge** (3)	**Camden Yards**	26,993	44–51	W2
96	July 11	Royals	6–1	**Bradish** (6–9)	Cameron (5–7)	—	**Camden Yards**	28,958	45–51	W3
97	July 12	Royals	8–2	**Wolfram** (2–2)	Strahm (3–3)	—	**Camden Yards**	31,355	46–51	W4
ASG	July 14	AL @ NL	4–0	Cease (1–0)	Sánchez (0–1)	—	Citizens Bank Park	43,916	—	―
98	July 17	@ Astros	3–2	**Sanders** (1–0)	King (2–3)	**Wells** (3)	Daikin Park	31,867	47–51	W5
99	July 18	@ Astros	4–2 (11)	**Kittredge** (1–1)	De Los Santos (0–3)	**Sanders** (1)	Daikin Park	31,649	48–51	W6
100	July 19	@ Astros	5–2	**Young** (8–2)	Brown (1–1)	**Wolfram** (1)	Daikin Park	28,936	49–51	W7
101	July 20	@ Red Sox	5–6	Whitlock (5–1)	**Wells** (2–2)	Chapman (22)	Fenway Park	37,659	49–52	L1
―	July 21	@ Red Sox	**Postponed (rain)** (Makeup date: July 22)							
102	July 22 (1)	@ Red Sox	3–6	Bennett (6–3)	**Kremer** (1–3)	Chapman (23)	Fenway Park	35,039	49–53	L2
103	July 22 (2)	@ Red Sox	5–1	**Bradish** (7–9)	Rivera (0–1)	—	Fenway Park	38,005	50–53	W1
104	July 24	Braves	6–7 (10)	Hernández (1–0)	**Kittredge** (1–2)	—	**Camden Yards**	35,775	50–54	L1
105	July 25	Braves	3–2	**Canó** (2–2)	Fuentes (4–1)	—	**Camden Yards**	37,883	51–54	W1
106	July 26	Braves	2–3 (11)	Kinley (6–4)	**Kittredge** (1–3)	—	**Camden Yards**	25,032	51–55	L1
107	July 27	@ Tigers	8–5	**Wolfram** (3–2)	Montero (7–6)	**Garcia** (5)	Comerica Park	21,913	52–55	W1
108	July 28	@ Tigers	0–14	Melton (6–1)	**Kremer** (1–4)	—	Comerica Park	27,453	52–56	L1
109	July 29	@ Tigers	10–9 (12)	**Wolfram** (4–2)	Sommers (0–2)	**Kittredge** (4)	Comerica Park	34,406	53–56	W1
110	July 31	Phillies	6–4	**Nunez** (3–2)	Kerkering (6–1)	**Wells** (4)	**Camden Yards**	31,857	54–56	W2

August: 15–13 (Home: 4–7; Away: 11–6)

#	Date	Opponent	Score	Win	Loss	Save	Stadium	Attendance	Record	Streak/ Box
111	August 1	Phillies	0–5	Sánchez (14–4)	**Baz** (4–10)	—	**Camden Yards**	37,751	54–57	L1
112	August 2	Phillies	0–8 (6)	Mayza (3–3)	**Bradish** (7–10)	—	**Camden Yards**	31,403	54–58	L2
113	August 4	Angels	3–1	**Povich** (2–1)	Rodriguez (3–4)	**Canó** (2)	**Camden Yards**	18,585	55–58	W1
114	August 5	Angels	5–2	**Rogers** (7–7)	Detmers (3–8)	**Kittredge** (5)	**Camden Yards**	16,977	56–58	W2
115	August 6	Angels	1–4	Farris (1–3)	**Young** (8–3)	Natera Jr. (2)	**Camden Yards**	21,202	56–59	L1
116	August 7	@ Rangers	1–2	Alexander (3–2)	**Baz** (4–11)	Latz (22)	Globe Life Field	27,804	56–60	L2
117	August 8	@ Rangers	1–5	deGrom (8–7)	**Bradish** (7–11)	–	Globe Life Field	38,626	56–61	L3
118	August 9	@ Rangers	10–5	**Hiraldo** (1–0)	Rocker (4–9)	—	Globe Life Field	35,334	57–61	W1
119	August 10	@ Twins	5–9	Kremer (2–4)	**Rogers** (7–8)	—	Target Field	20,155	57–62	L1
120	August 11	@ Twins	5–2	**Young** (9–3)	Ober (7–4)	**Kittredge** (6)	Target Field	21,677	58–62	W1
121	August 12	@ Twins	5–7	Matthews (6–8)	**Baz** (4–12)	Gómez (17)	Target Field	20,160	58–63	L1
122	August 14	@ Rays	6–5	**Walker** (1–0)	Cleavinger (4–4)	**Sanders** (2)	Tropicana Field	18,343	59–63	W1
123	August 15	@ Rays	4–3 (10)	**Kittredge** (2–3)	Baker (1–1)	**Sanders** (3)	Tropicana Field	28,055	60–63	W2
124	August 16	@ Rays	10–2	**Rogers** (8–8)	Peralta (5–10)	–	Tropicana Field	18,598	61–63	W3
125	August 17	@ Rays	6–7	Booser (1–0)	**Canó** (2–3)	Baker (35)	Tropicana Field	10,159	61–64	L1
126	August 18	Yankees	1–3	De Los Santos (1–0)	**Baz** (4–13)	Bednar (28)	Camden Yards	23,357	61–65	L2
127	August 19	Yankees	3–5	Headrick (7–2)	**Sanders** (1–1)	Bednar (29)	Camden Yards	26,453	61–66	L3
128	August 20	Yankees	1–6	Cole (7–6)	**Bradish** (7–12)	Yarbrough (3)	Camden Yards	29,200	61–67	L4
129	August 21	Rays	5–3	**Rogers** (9–8)	Peralta (5–11)	**Garcia** (6)	**Camden Yards**	25,963	62–67	W1
130	August 22	Rays	3–2 (10)	**Garcia** (5–1)	Baker (1–2)	—	**Camden Yards**	27,158	63–67	W2
131	August 23	Rays	1–3	Martinez (13–4)	**Baz** (4–14)	Baker (37)	**Camden Yards**	27,745	63–68	L1
132	August 25	@ Cardinals	13–1	**Bassitt** (5–4)	Liberatore (5–12)	—	Busch Stadium	26,877	64–68	W1
133	August 26	@ Cardinals	8–7	**Wolfram** (5–2)	O'Brien (3–6)	**Kittredge** (7)	Busch Stadium	21,185	65–68	W2
134	August 27	@ Cardinals	5–7	Gastélum (4–3)	**Rogers** (9–9)	O'Brien (34)	Busch Stadium	20,723	65–69	L1
135	August 28	@ Athletics	4–3 (10)	**Kittredge** (3–3)	Basso (0–1)	**Hoppe** (1)	Sutter Health Park	7,228	66–69	W1
136	August 29	@ Athletics	5–3	**Baz** (5–14)	Perkins (3–10)	**Kittredge** (8)	Sutter Health Park	10,619	67–69	W2
137	August 30	@ Athletics	8–5	**Bassitt** (6–4)	Springs (3–13)	**Canó** (3)	Sutter Health Park	7,606	68–69	W3
138	August 31	@ Rockies	2–1	**Wolfram** (6–2)	Manfredi (1–1)	**Kittredge** (9)	Coors Field	17,277	69–69	W4

September: 10–13 (Home: 5–8; Away: 5–5)

#	Date	Opponent	Score	Win	Loss	Save	Stadium	Attendance	Record	Streak/ Box
139	September 1	@ Rockies	2–4	Hill (1–3)	**De León** (0–1)	Romano (14)	Coors Field	16,334	69–70	L1
140	September 2	@ Rockies	5–6 (11)	Castaño (2–0)	**Wolfram** (6–3)	—	Coors Field	15,616	69–71	L2
141	September 3	Red Sox	5–6	Miller (4–0)	**De León** (0–2)	Chapman (31)	**Camden Yards**	19,720	69–72	L3
142	September 4	Red Sox	0–1	Suarez (6–4)	**Baz** (5–15)	Chapman (32)	**Camden Yards**	19,821	69–73	L4
143	September 5	Red Sox	0–5	Gray (17–4)	**Bassitt** (6–5)	—	**Camden Yards**	32,207	69–74	L5
144	September 6	Red Sox	1–3	Tolle (9–6)	**Bradish** (7–13)	Chapman (33)	**Camden Yards**	27,596	69–75	L6
145	September 7	Guardians	6–4	**Rogers** (10–9)	Cantillo (9–9)	**Walker** (1)	**Camden Yards**	21,612	70–75	W1
146	September 8	Guardians	5–9	Herrin (3–4)	**Young** (9–4)	—	**Camden Yards**	13,279	70–76	L1
147	September 9	Guardians	9–5	**Baz** (6–15)	Griffin (15–5)	**Garcia** (7)	**Camden Yards**	16,222	71–76	W1
148	September 11	@ Blue Jays	7–4	**Bassitt** (7–5)	Scherzer (2–8)	**Garcia** (8)	Rogers Centre	42,111	72–76	W2
149	September 12	@ Blue Jays	3–7	Arrighetti (8–9)	**Bradish** (7–14)	—	Rogers Centre	41,949	72–77	L1
150	September 13	@ Blue Jays	1–8	Cease (11–5)	**Rogers** (10–10)	—	Rogers Centre	41,805	72–78	L2
151	September 14	@ Mets	2–1	**Canó** (3–3)	Núñez (1–1)	**Garcia** (9)	Citi Field	35,800	73–78	W1
152	September 15	@ Mets	7–5 (11)	**Hoppe** (1–1)	Pintaro (2–2)	**Kittredge** (10)	Citi Field	28,097	74–78	W2
153	September 16	@ Mets	7–1	**Bassitt** (8–5)	Curry (0–1)	—	Citi Field	25,324	75–78	W3
154	September 18	Brewers	5–6 (10)	Megill (3–3)	**Wolfram** (6–4)	Patrick (6)	**Camden Yards**	25,304	75–79	L1
155	September 19	Brewers	0–1	Gasser (5–5)	**Rogers** (10–11)	Ashby (3)	**Camden Yards**	32,663	75–80	L2
156	September 20	Brewers	0–3	Hall (4–0)	**Young** (9–5)	Megill (29)	**Camden Yards**	15,337	75–81	L3
157	September 21	Blue Jays	4–3	**Canó** (4–3)	Rogers (2–3)	**Garcia** (10)	**Camden Yards**	12,067	76–81	W1
―	September 22	Blue Jays	**Postponed (rain)** (Makeup date: September 23)							
158	September 23 (1)	Blue Jays	4–2	**Bassitt** (9–5)	Scherzer (3–9)	**Kittredge** (11)	**Camden Yards**	10,562	77–81	W2
159	September 23 (2)	Blue Jays	4–2	**Gibson** (2–3)	Van Eyk (0–2)	—	**Camden Yards**	19,824	78–81	W3
160	September 25 (1)	@ Yankees	10–2	**Suárez** (3–0)	Beck (0–2)	—	Yankee Stadium	Game 2	79–81	W4
161	September 25 (2)	@ Yankees	3–6	Warren (11–6)	**Young** (9–6)	—	Yankee Stadium	46,656	79–82	L1
–	September 27	@ Yankees	**Canceled (rain)**							

== Roster ==
2026 Baltimore Orioles
Roster
Pitchers: 45 Keegan Akin; 40 Chris Bassitt; 74 Félix Bautista; 34 Shane Baz; 38 Kyle Bradish; 78 Yennier Canó; 81 Luis De León; 24 Zach Eflin; 71 Dietrich Enns; 70 José Espada; 65 Cameron Foster; 50 Rico Garcia; 43 Trey Gibson; 21 Ryan Helsley; 76 Yaramil Hiraldo; 26 Alex Hoppe; 39 Andrew Kittredge; 64 Dean Kremer; 66 Anthony Nunez; 37 Cade Povich; 72 Nick Raquet; 28 Trevor Rogers; 73 Cam Sanders; 49 Albert Suárez; 58 Lou Trivino; 61 Josh Walker; 68 Tyler Wells; 80 Cameron Weston; 86 Grant Wolfram; 63 Brandon Young	Catchers: 29 Samuel Basallo; 31 Sam Huff; 75 Carlos Narváez; 79 Yohel Pozo; 27 Jake Rogers; 35 Adley Rutschman; 41 Chadwick Tromp; Infielders: 23 Blaze Alexander; 25 Pete Alonso; 54 Jose Barrero; 32 Christian Encarnacion-Strand; 2 Gunnar Henderson; 7 Jackson Holliday; 82 Jeremiah Jackson; 16 Coby Mayo; 6 Ryan Mountcastle; 52 Luis Vázquez; 32 Weston Wilson	Outfielders: 12 Dylan Beavers; 17 Colton Cowser; 27 Christian Franklin; 62 Rece Hinds; 13 Heston Kjerstad; 9 Tyler O'Neill; 88 Luis Robert Jr.; 62 Johnathan Rodríguez; 83 Michael Siani; 30 Leody Taveras; 3 Taylor Ward; Other batters: 98 Maverick Handley	Manager: 55 Craig Albernaz; Coaches: 36 Jason Bourgeois (first base); 46 Buck Britton (third base); 47 Miguel Cairo (infield); 51 Hank Conger (bullpen); 53 Donnie Ecker (bench); 58 Drew French (pitching); 89 Ryan Klimek (pitching strategy); 86 Dustin Lind (hitting); 85 Brady North (assistant hitting); 77 Mitch Plassmeyer (assistant pitching); 87 Joe Singley (field coordinator/catching)

== Player stats ==
= Indicates team leader

= Indicates league leader

=== Batting ===
Note: G = Games played; AB = At bats; R = Runs scored; H = Hits; 2B = Doubles; 3B = Triples; HR = Home runs; RBI = Runs batted in; SB = Stolen bases; BB = Walks; AVG = Batting average; SLG = Slugging average

Player	G	AB	R	H	2B	3B	HR	RBI	SB	BB	AVG	SLG
Gunnar Henderson	158	623	88	141	27	6	24	60	10	67	.226	.404
Pete Alonso	161	602	100	161	24	0	43	113	5	81	.267	.522
Leody Taveras	139	429	58	94	18	6	8	56	11	41	.219	.345
Coby Mayo	132	412	64	94	18	3	24	63	4	36	.228	.461
Taylor Ward	111	410	64	101	20	0	7	30	4	87	.246	.346
Samuel Basallo	112	360	40	80	10	1	18	54	0	32	.222	.406
Colton Cowser	142	341	41	77	10	0	13	40	10	46	.226	.370
Dylan Beavers	104	324	41	74	20	0	9	44	5	35	.228	.373
Jackson Holliday	98	315	45	72	12	1	7	30	8	34	.229	.340
Jeremiah Jackson	102	277	29	60	11	0	10	45	2	10	.217	.365
Blaze Alexander	93	261	35	79	13	2	4	31	10	19	.303	.414
Adley Rutschman	67	247	30	62	19	1	8	47	0	30	.251	.433
Tyler O'Neill	85	231	31	49	8	0	10	23	1	27	.212	.377
Christian Encarnacion-Strand	58	195	25	54	13	0	11	39	1	11	.277	.513
Carlos Narváez	33	77	5	8	1	0	0	0	1	5	.104	.117
Christian Franklin	21	60	6	9	2	0	0	1	3	7	.180	.220
Weston Wilson	19	39	6	9	1	0	1	3	2	6	.231	.333
Sam Huff	14	33	1	4	2	0	0	1	0	1	.121	.182
Rece Hinds	12	28	0	5	2	0	0	1	0	4	.179	.250
Yohel Pozo	19	27	4	7	0	0	1	2	1	1	.259	.370
Chadwick Tromp	9	24	1	3	0	0	0	1	0	0	.125	.125
Heston Kjerstad	11	19	1	4	1	0	0	2	0	0	.211	.263
Ryan Mountcastle	8	14	0	4	1	0	0	1	0	1	.286	.357
Johnathan Rodríguez	7	11	0	2	1	0	0	2	0	3	.182	.273
Luis Robert Jr.	3	11	2	2	1	0	1	3	0	1	.182	.545
Jose Barrero	2	6	0	1	0	0	0	0	0	0	.167	.167
Jake Rogers	3	5	0	1	0	0	0	0	0	0	.200	.200
Maverick Handley	1	1	0	0	0	0	0	0	0	0	.000	.000
Michael Siani	1	1	0	0	0	0	0	0	0	0	.000	.000
Luis Vázquez	1	0	1	0	0	0	0	0	0	0	.---	.---
Totals	161	5373	718	1257	235	20	199	692	78	586	.234	.396

=== Pitching ===
Note: W = Wins; L = Losses; ERA = Earned run average; G = Games pitched; GS = Games started; SV = Saves; IP = Innings pitched; H = Hits allowed; R = Runs allowed; ER = Earned runs; BB = Walks allowed; SO = Strikeouts

Player	W	L	ERA	G	GS	SV	IP	H	R	ER	BB	SO
Shane Baz	6	15	4.11	31	31	0	179.2	179	92	82	63	154
Trevor Rogers	10	11	4.03	30	30	0	169.2	162	81	76	39	157
Brandon Young	9	6	3.56	28	28	0	156.2	150	71	62	61	133
Kyle Bradish	7	14	4.12	29	29	0	155.0	156	83	71	70	142
Chris Bassitt	9	5	4.59	20	18	0	102.0	120	53	52	38	74
Rico Garcia	5	1	3.09	75	0	10	67.0	43	26	23	22	68
Albert Suárez	3	0	3.86	28	0	1	63.0	57	32	27	20	46
Anthony Nunez	3	2	4.07	52	0	3	59.2	47	31	27	26	66
Tyler Wells	2	2	2.67	43	0	4	54.0	39	19	16	13	53
Grant Wolfram	6	4	4.30	60	0	1	52.1	53	30	25	16	61
Yennier Canó	4	3	2.90	68	0	3	49.2	40	19	16	13	45
Andrew Kittredge	3	3	3.54	55	0	11	48.1	55	30	19	11	40
Trey Gibson	2	3	6.13	9	8	0	39.2	41	27	27	27	37
Cade Povich	2	1	4.38	8	7	0	37.0	40	18	18	15	28
Dean Kremer	1	4	6.50	7	7	0	36.0	38	28	26	11	38
Josh Walker	1	0	2.08	31	0	1	30.1	24	9	7	12	29
Keegan Akin	0	1	5.68	24	2	0	25.1	29	18	16	9	17
Cam Sanders	1	1	2.70	19	0	3	20.0	13	6	6	10	27
Dietrich Enns	3	0	3.94	13	0	0	16.0	13	8	7	11	13
Ryan Helsley	0	4	4.11	17	0	8	15.1	13	9	7	9	21
Alex Hoppe	1	0	1.84	18	0	1	14.2	14	8	3	9	13
Luis De León	0	2	1.93	8	0	0	9.1	6	3	2	2	6
Yaramil Hiraldo	1	0	8.68	8	0	0	9.1	9	9	9	10	13
Cameron Foster	0	0	9.00	6	0	0	9.0	17	10	9	8	9
Zach Eflin	0	0	2.45	1	1	0	3.2	4	1	1	2	7
Nick Raquet	0	0	7.36	4	0	0	3.2	3	3	3	2	1
Lou Trivino	0	0	18.00	2	0	0	3.0	6	6	6	3	3
Weston Wilson	0	0	15.43	3	0	0	2.1	6	4	4	0	0
Félix Bautista	0	0	16.20	2	0	0	1.2	4	3	3	1	3
Cameron Weston	0	0	0.00	1	0	0	1.0	0	0	0	1	1
Chadwick Tromp	0	0	18.00	1	0	0	1.0	3	2	2	1	0
José Espada	0	0	0.00	1	0	0	1.0	2	0	0	0	0
Totals	79	82	4.08	161	161	46	1436.1	1386	739	651	535	1305

== Farm system ==
Coaching assignments in the Orioles farm system were announced on February 3, 2026.

Level	Team	League	Manager
Triple-A	Norfolk Tides	International League	Tim Federowicz
Double-A	Chesapeake Baysox	Eastern League	Roberto Mercado
High-A	Frederick Keys	South Atlantic League	Collin Woody
Low-A	Delmarva Shorebirds	Carolina League	Adonis Smith
Rookie	FCL Orioles	Florida Complex League	Christian Frias
Foreign Rookie	DSL Orioles 1	Dominican Summer League	Chris Madera
Foreign Rookie	DSL Orioles 2	Dominican Summer League	Elbis Morel
