= Brady North =

American baseball player & coach (born 1991)

Baltimore Orioles – No. 85
- Coach
- Born: April 24, 1991 (age 34); Nashville, Tennessee, U.S.
- Bats: Left Throws: Left

Teams
- Tampa Bay Rays (2022–2025); Baltimore Orioles (2026–present)

Brady Timothy North (born April 24, 1991) is an American former professional baseball first baseman and outfielder who currently serves as the assistant hitting coach for the Baltimore Orioles of Major League Baseball (MLB).

== Playing career ==
North is a product of Tampa, Florida which is a well known baseball community. He graduated from Gaither High School where he was a 4 year starter for Hall of Fame Coach Frank Permuy.

North played his first two years of college College baseball at Hillsborough Community College for Head Coach Gary Calhoun.

North then played the 2013 college baseball College baseball at Jacksonville University for Head Coach Terry Alexander.

North then attended Cumberland University, where he played college baseball for the Cumberland Phoenix for Hall of Fame Head Coach Woody With Cumberland, North won the NAIA World Series in 2014.

North was not selected in the Major League Baseball draft. He spent the 2015 season with the Washington Wild Things of the Frontier League, going 2-for-25 (.080) with one RBI and one stolen base. North returned to the Frontier League in 2016 with the Lake Erie Crushers, batting .229/.356/.250 with two RBI.

== Coaching career ==
=== Tampa Bay Rays ===
On January 18, 2019, the Tampa Bay Rays hired North to serve as the hitting coach for their rookie-level affiliate, the Gulf Coast League Rays.

After the 2019 season, North was promoted to the Rays' High-A affiliate, the Bowling Green Hot Rods, where they would end up winning the High-A East Championship.

During the offseason of 2021, North worked winter ball in LIDOM as the hitting coach for Leones del Escogido. On November 18, 2021, the Rays promoted North to their major league coaching staff.

In the 2024 offseason, North was hired by the Criollos de Caguas of the Roberto Clemente professional baseball league in Puerto Rico to serve as the team's hitting coach.

October 3, 2025, the Rays announced that North would not return to the major league coaching staff in 2026, and offered him an alternative role within the organization.

=== Baltimore Orioles ===
On November 20, 2025, the Baltimore Orioles hired North to serve as the team's assistant hitting coach under new manager Craig Albernaz.
