= Cam Sanders =

American baseball player (born 1996)

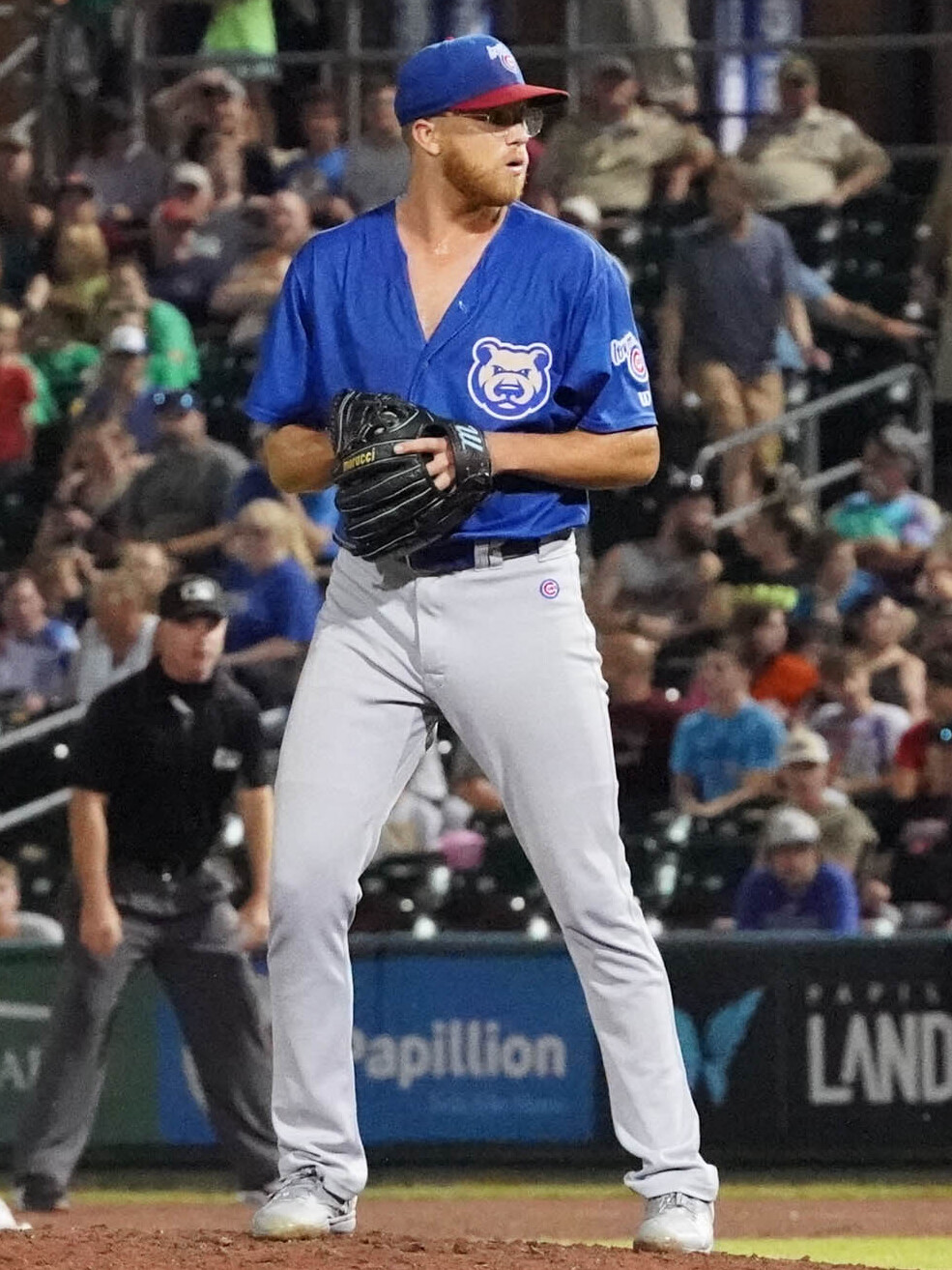
- Sanders with the Iowa Cubs in 2023

Baltimore Orioles – No. 73
- Pitcher
- Born: December 9, 1996 (age 29); Thibodaux, Louisiana, U.S.
- Bats: Right Throws: Right

MLB debut
- August 5, 2025, for the Pittsburgh Pirates

MLB statistics (through 2026 season)
- Win–loss record: 1–1
- Earned run average: 5.25
- Strikeouts: 44
- Stats at Baseball Reference

Teams
- Pittsburgh Pirates (2025–2026); Baltimore Orioles (2026–present)

Cameron Ronald Sanders (born December 9, 1996) is an American professional baseball pitcher for the Baltimore Orioles of Major League Baseball (MLB). He has previously played in MLB for the Pittsburgh Pirates.

== Amateur career ==
Sanders attended Edward Douglas White Catholic High School in Thibodaux, Louisiana. He played college baseball at Northwest Florida State College for two years before transferring to Louisiana State University (LSU) for the 2018 season. He went 1–0 with a 5.59 ERA over 38 1/3 innings for LSU in 2018.

== Professional career ==
=== Chicago Cubs ===
Sanders was selected by the Chicago Cubs in the 12th round (368th overall) of the 2018 Major League Baseball draft. Sanders signed, forgoing his senior year of college baseball. He made his professional debut with the Rookie-level Arizona League Cubs and was promoted to the Class A Short Season Eugene Emeralds after one game, finishing the season with a 4.32 ERA over 16 2/3 innings. He spent the 2019 season with the Class A South Bend Cubs, starting twenty games and going 8–4 with a 2.94 ERA and 84 strikeouts over 101 innings, earning All-Star honors. Sanders did not play in a game in 2020 due to the cancellation of the minor league season because of the COVID-19 pandemic.

Sanders returned to action in 2021 with the Double-A Tennessee Smokies with whom he started 18 games and went 4–7 with a 5.32 ERA and 107 strikeouts over 89 2/3 innings. He returned to Tennessee to open the 2022 season and was promoted to the Triple-A Iowa Cubs in early May. Over 35 games (17 starts) between the two teams, he went 2–9 with a 4.94 ERA, 111 strikeouts, and sixty walks over 98 1/3 innings. Sanders played the 2023 season with Iowa and made 51 relief appearances, going 7-2 with a 5.15 ERA, 97 strikeouts, and 69 walks over 64 2/3 innings.

Sanders was assigned to Iowa to open the 2024 season and also spent time with Tennessee, going 2–3 with a 5.83 ERA over 49 appearances. He elected free agency following the season on November 4, 2024.

=== Pittsburgh Pirates ===
On January 21, 2025, Sanders signed a minor league contract with the Pittsburgh Pirates organization. He opened the 2025 season with the Double-A Altoona Curve and was later promoted to the Triple-A Indianapolis Indians.

On August 5, 2025, the Pirates selected Sanders's contract and promoted him to the major leagues. He made his MLB debut that night at PNC Park against the San Francisco Giants, pitching two scoreless innings in relief and recording his first MLB strikeout against Christian Koss. Sanders made six appearances for Pittsburgh during his rookie campaign, recording an 8.10 ERA with four strikeouts across 6 2/3 innings pitched.

Sanders was optioned to Indianapolis to begin the 2026 season. He was recalled to the major league roster on March 31, 2026. In nine appearances for Pittsburgh, Sanders struggled to an 8.68 ERA with 13 strikeouts across 9 1/3 innings pitched. On July 11, Sanders was designated for assignment by the Pirates.

=== Baltimore Orioles ===
Sanders was traded to the Baltimore Orioles in exchange for cash considerations on July 13, 2026. Sanders' Orioles debut in a 3–2 away victory over the Houston Astros four nights later on July 17 resulted in his first MLB win. He entered the game with the bases loaded and one out in the seventh inning and retired the only two batters he faced without surrendering a run. Sanders recorded his first MLB career save in an 11-inning 4–2 victory over the Astros the following day. With the Orioles, Sanders made 19 relief appearances and had a 1–1 record, a 2.70 ERA, and 27 strikeouts across 20 innings pitched.

== Personal life ==
Sanders' father, Scott Sanders, played seven years of Major League Baseball.
