= Luis De León =

Dominican baseball player (born 2003)

Baltimore Orioles – No. 81
- Pitcher
- Born: April 14, 2003 (age 23); Barahona, Dominican Republic
- Bats: Left Throws: Left

MLB debut
- September 1, 2026, for the Baltimore Orioles

MLB statistics (through 2026 season)
- Win–loss record: 0–2
- Earned run average: 1.93
- Strikeouts: 6

Teams
- Baltimore Orioles (2026–present)

Luis Mario De León (born April 14, 2003) is a Dominican professional baseball pitcher for the Baltimore Orioles of Major League Baseball (MLB).

== Career ==
De León signed with the Baltimore Orioles as an international free agent on December 15, 2021. He made his professional debut in 2022 with the Dominican Summer League Orioles. He pitched 2023 with the rookie–level Florida Complex League Orioles and Single–A Delmarva Shorebirds, and 2024 with Delmarva and the High–A Aberdeen IronBirds.

De León pitched 2025 with Delmarva, Aberdeen, and Double–A Chesapeake Baysox. After the season, he pitched in the Arizona Fall League.

De León began the 2026 campaign with Chesapeake before being promoted to the Triple–A Norfolk Tides; in 26 appearances (22 starts) for the two affiliates, he accumulated a 6–6 record and 4.73 ERA with 121 strikeouts over 99 innings of work. He was selected to the 40–man roster and promoted to the major leagues for the first time on 1 September. He was the losing pitcher in his MLB debut later that night after allowing a two-run homer to TJ Rumfield in the seventh inning of an Orioles' 4–2 away defeat to the Colorado Rockies.
