= Cameron Foster =

American baseball player (born 1999)

Atlanta Braves
- Pitcher
- Born: March 17, 1999 (age 27); Houston, Texas, U.S.
- Bats: Right Throws: Right

MLB debut
- April 16, 2026, for the Baltimore Orioles

MLB statistics (through 2026 season)
- Win–loss record: 0–0
- Earned run average: 9.00
- Strikeouts: 9
- Stats at Baseball Reference

Teams
- Baltimore Orioles (2026)

Cameron Michael John Foster (born March 17, 1999) is an American professional baseball pitcher for the Atlanta Braves of Major League Baseball (MLB). He has previously played in MLB for the Baltimore Orioles.

== Career ==
Foster played college baseball at Wharton County Junior College and McNeese State University.

=== New York Mets ===
Foster was selected by the New York Mets in the 14th round of the 2022 Major League Baseball draft. He made his professional debut in 2023 with the High–A Brooklyn Cyclones; in 18 games (16 starts) for the team, he compiled a 4–6 record and 4.20 ERA with 85 strikeouts across 81 1/3 innings pitched.

Foster made 27 appearances (including nine starts) for the Double–A Binghamton Rumble Ponies during the 2024 campaign, registering a 4–2 record and 3.64 ERA with 68 strikeouts across 71 1/3 innings pitched. He began the 2025 season with Binghamton, and was promoted to the Triple–A Syracuse Mets after recording a 1.01 ERA with 34 strikeouts across 19 appearances.

=== Baltimore Orioles ===
On July 25, 2025, the Mets traded Foster and Wellington Aracena to the Baltimore Orioles in exchange for Gregory Soto. He made 13 appearances down the stretch for the Triple-A Norfolk Tides, recording a 3.38 ERA with 23 strikeouts over 16 innings of work. On November 18, the Orioles added Foster to their 40-man roster to protect him from the Rule 5 draft.

Foster was optioned to Triple-A Norfolk to begin the 2026 season. On April 16, 2026, the Orioles promoted Foster to the major leagues for the first time. He made six appearances for Baltimore, struggling to a 9.00 ERA with nine strikeouts over nine innings of work.

=== Atlanta Braves ===
On November 17, 2026, Foster was claimed off waivers by the Atlanta Braves.
