= Craig Albernaz =

American baseball coach (born 1982)

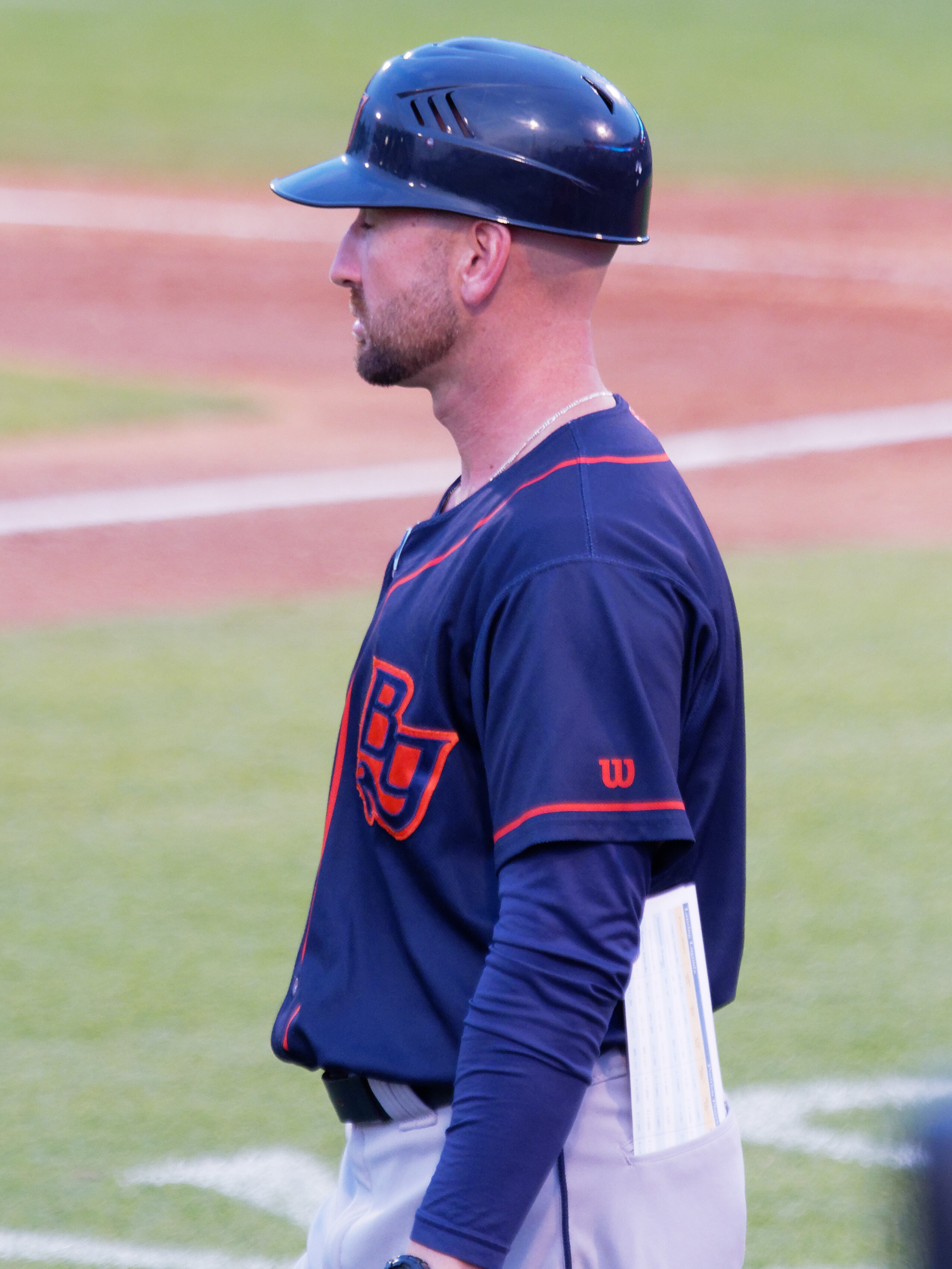
- Albernaz with the Bowling Green Hot Rods in 2018

Baltimore Orioles – No. 55
- Manager
- Born: October 30, 1982 (age 43); Fall River, Massachusetts, U.S.
- Bats: Right Throws: Right

MLB statistics (through August 15, 2026)
- Managerial record: 79–82
- Winning %: .491
- Stats at Baseball Reference
- Managerial record at Baseball Reference

Teams
- As manager: Baltimore Orioles (2026–present); As coach: Tampa Bay Rays (2015–2019); San Francisco Giants (2020–2023); Cleveland Guardians (2024–2025)

Craig Francis Albernaz (born October 30, 1982) is an American professional baseball manager for the Baltimore Orioles of Major League Baseball (MLB). He played college baseball for Eckerd College. Albernaz signed with the Tampa Bay Rays as a free agent in 2006. He was formerly a coach for the San Francisco Giants and Cleveland Guardians.

== High school, college, and playing career ==
Albernaz attended Somerset Berkley Regional High School in Somerset, Massachusetts.

He attended Eckerd College ('05), where he played college baseball as a pitcher and catcher. As a catcher, he threw out 61% of attempted base stealers, and his arm was regularly clocked at 1.85 seconds to second base.

Albernaz was undrafted out of college and signed with the Tampa Bay Rays as a free agent in 2006. He played as a catcher in the Rays organization from 2006 through 2013. Albernaz spent his final season in 2014 in the Detroit Tigers organization. In his minor league career, five seasons of which he played in Triple–A, he threw out 44% of attempted base stealers (145 of 329).

== Coaching career ==
=== Tampa Bay Rays ===
Albernaz began his coaching career in 2015. He served as a coach for the rookie–level Princeton Rays in the Appalachian League in 2015 and for the Low–A Hudson Valley Renegades in the New York-Penn League in 2016. He started the 2017 season as the third base and catching coach of the Triple–A Durham Bulls in the International League, before serving as the manager of Hudson Valley. He served as the High–A Bowling Green Hot Rods' manager in the Midwest League in 2018. He was named the 2018 Midwest League Manager of the Year. Albernaz spent the 2019 season as one of the Rays minor league field coordinators.

=== San Francisco Giants ===
On December 11, 2019, Albernaz was hired by the San Francisco Giants as their bullpen and catching coach.

=== Cleveland Guardians ===
On November 10, 2023, the Cleveland Guardians hired Albernaz to be their bench coach. On November 13, 2024, Albernaz was promoted to the role of assistant manager.

=== Baltimore Orioles ===
On October 27, 2025, the Baltimore Orioles hired Albernaz as their manager.

In a freak accident in a game against the Arizona Diamondbacks on April 13, 2026, a foul ball lined off the bat of Jeremiah Jackson struck Albernaz in the face. Albernaz was taken to the hospital and suffered seven fractures in his right cheek and a broken jaw, however he returned to manage the next day.

=== Managerial record ===
As of September 27,2026

Team	Year	Regular season					Postseason			
Team	Year	Games	Won	Lost	Win %	Finish	Won	Lost	Win %	Result
BAL	2026	161	79	82	.491		–	–	–	–
Total		161	79	82	.491		0	0	–	
