= Brandon Young (baseball) =

American baseball player (born 1998)

Baltimore Orioles – No. 63
- Pitcher
- Born: August 19, 1998 (age 28); Lumberton, Texas, U.S.
- Bats: Right Throws: Right

MLB debut
- April 19, 2025, for the Baltimore Orioles

MLB statistics (through 2026 season)
- Win–loss record: 10–13
- Earned run average: 4.28
- Strikeouts: 180
- Stats at Baseball Reference

Teams
- Baltimore Orioles (2025–present)

Brandon Wayne Young (born August 19, 1998) is an American professional baseball pitcher for the Baltimore Orioles of Major League Baseball (MLB). He made his MLB debut in 2025.

== Career ==
=== Amateur career ===
Young attended Lumberton High School in Lumberton, Texas, graduating in 2016. He played college baseball for two seasons for Howard College and two seasons for the University of Louisiana at Lafayette.

=== Minor leagues ===
On June 14, 2020, Young signed with the Baltimore Orioles as an undrafted free agent. He did not play in a game in 2020 due to the cancellation of the minor league season because of the COVID-19 pandemic. Young returned to action in 2021 with the Single–A Delmarva Shorebirds and High–A Aberdeen IronBirds. In 23 games (20 starts) for the two affiliates, he compiled a 4–3 record and 3.52 ERA with 114 strikeouts across 84 1/3 innings pitched.

Young made 3 starts for the Double–A Bowie Baysox in 2022, but later underwent Tommy John surgery and missed the remainder of the season. He split the 2023 campaign between the rookie–level Florida Complex League Orioles, Delmarva, Aberdeen, and Bowie. In 11 total starts for the four affiliates, Young logged an 0–5 record and 4.50 ERA with 40 strikeouts over 40 innings of work.

Young made 27 appearances (24 starts) split between Double–A Bowie and the Triple–A Norfolk Tides, compiling a 5–6 record and 3.57 ERA with 132 strikeouts across 111 innings pitched. He was named Baltimore's minor league pitcher of the year after the season. On November 19, 2024, the Orioles added Young to their 40-man roster to protect him from the Rule 5 draft.

=== Major leagues ===
Young was optioned to Triple-A Norfolk to begin the 2025 season. On April 19, 2025, Young was promoted to the major leagues for the first time. He allowed three runs over four innings as the starting pitcher in his MLB debut in a 9–5 home win over the Cincinnati Reds later that afternoon. On July 8, Young threw an immaculate inning against the New York Mets, becoming the 4th in Orioles history and the first since Kevin Gausman in 2018. He struck out Jesse Winker, Jeff McNeil, and Luis Torrens.

On August 15, 2025, Young got his first win and threw a perfect game through 7 2/3 innings in a game against the Houston Astros. It was the longest perfect game bid for Baltimore since Mike Mussina also had his perfect game broken up with two outs in the eighth in 1998. Young's perfect game was broken up by an infield single from former teammate Ramón Urías, who had been traded to the Astros just two weeks prior. Young went on to strike out the next batter, ending the game having pitched eight innings, with no earned runs, no walks and only one hit. On August 22, Young was placed on the injured list due to a strained left hamstring, an injury sustained as he was covering first base in a game against Houston. He was transferred to the 60-day injured list on August 27, officially ending his season; in 12 starts during his rookie campaign, Young posted a 1-7 record and 6.24 ERA with 47 strikeouts.

Young was optioned to Triple-A Norfolk to begin the 2026 season. He was called up on April 6, after Dietrich Enns was placed on the 15-day injured list with a foot infection, and started that night's game against the Chicago White Sox. Young was sent back down the following day.
