= Christian Franklin =

American baseball player (born 1999)

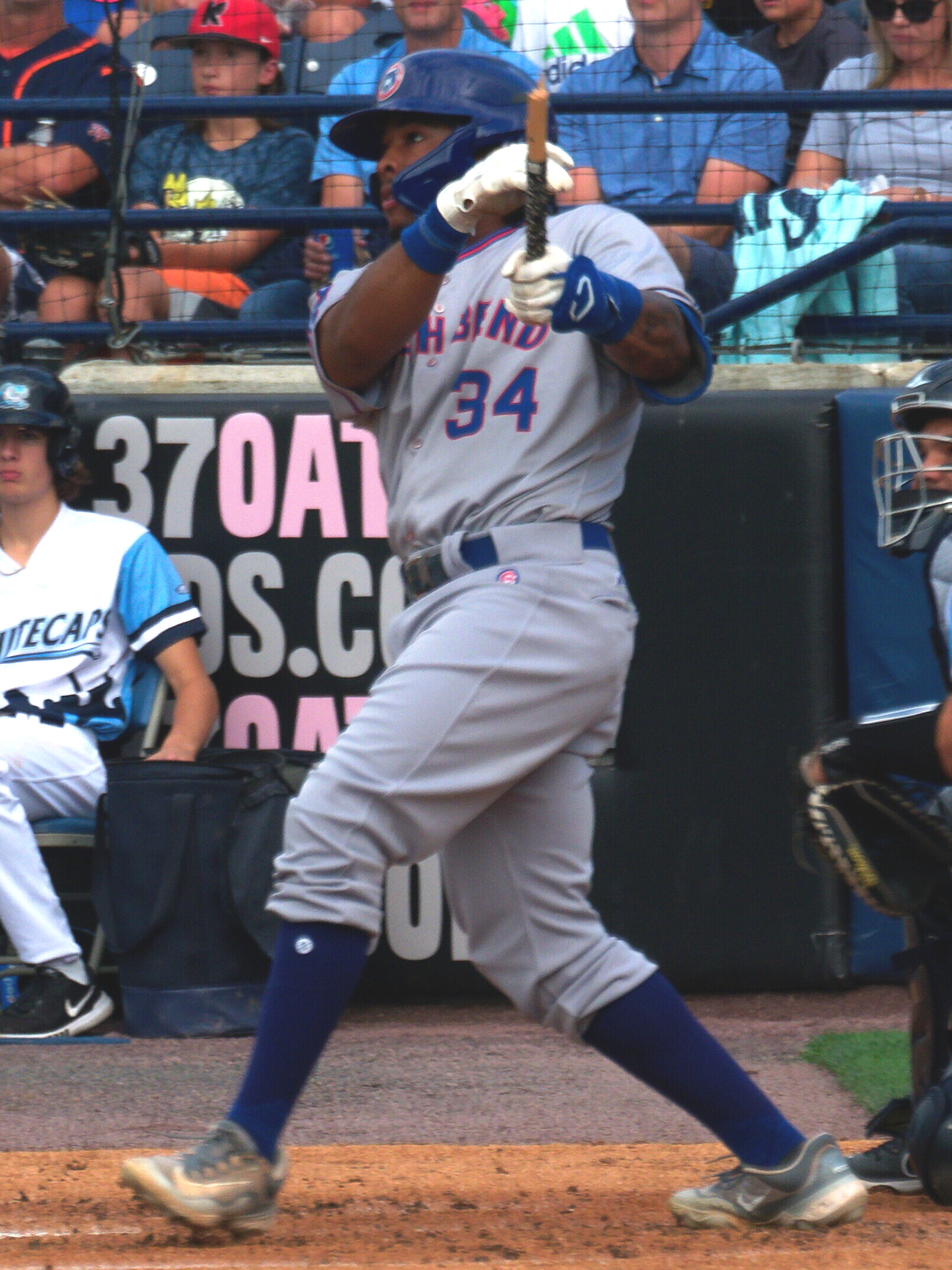
- Franklin with the South Bend Cubs in 2023

Baltimore Orioles – No. 27
- Outfielder
- Born: November 30, 1999 (age 26); Overland Park, Kansas, U.S.
- Bats: Right Throws: Right

MLB debut
- August 4, 2026, for the Baltimore Orioles

MLB statistics (through 2026 season)
- Batting average: .180
- Home runs: 0
- Runs batted in: 1
- Stats at Baseball Reference

Teams
- Baltimore Orioles (2026–present)

Christian Franklin (born November 30, 1999) is an American professional baseball outfielder for the Baltimore Orioles of Major League Baseball (MLB). He played college baseball for the Arkansas Razorbacks.

== Amateur career ==
Franklin grew up in Overland Park, Kansas, and attended Rockhurst High School in Kansas City, Missouri. He batted .361 over his junior and senior seasons with 18 RBI and 14 runs scored.

Franklin became the Razorbacks' starting left fielder as a freshman and was named to the Southeastern Conference (SEC) All-Freshman team after batting .274 with 41 runs scored, 34 runs batted in and 12 stolen bases. After the season, he played summer baseball for the Santa Barbara Foresters of the California Collegiate League. As a sophomore, Franklin batted .381 with four doubles, a triple, three home runs and RBI in 16 games before the season was cut short due to the coronavirus pandemic.

Franklin was named a preseason First Team All-American by Baseball America and by the National College Baseball Writers Association going into his junior year. He was named the SEC Player of the Week on May 3, 2021, after driving in 10 runs in three games against LSU and was a second team All-SEC selection at the end of the regular season. In the opening game of the 2021 NCAA Division I baseball tournament, Franklin had a run-saving catch followed by a home run to spark a come from behind win over NJIT.

== Professional career ==
=== Chicago Cubs ===
Franklin was selected in the fourth round with the 123rd overall pick in the 2021 Major League Baseball draft by the Chicago Cubs. He signed with the team on July 16, 2021, and received a $425,000 bonus. Franklin was assigned to the Rookie-level Arizona Complex League Cubs to begin his professional career, where he played four games before being promoted to the Low-A Myrtle Beach Pelicans. Over 24 games between the two teams, he batted .237 with one home run and eight RBI.

=== Washington Nationals ===
On July 30, 2025, the Cubs traded Franklin and Ronny Cruz to the Nationals in exchange for pitcher Michael Soroka. He made 31 appearances for the Triple-A Rochester Red Wings, hitting .290/.382/.427 with four home runs, 23 RBI, and eight stolen bases. On November 18, the Nationals added Franklin to their 40-man roster to protect him from the Rule 5 draft. Franklin was optioned to Triple-A Rochester to begin the 2026 season. He appeared in 93 games with the Red Wings in 2026, batting .249 with 17 doubles, two triples, six home runs, 39 RBI, 17 stolen bases and a .735 OPS.

=== Baltimore Orioles ===
On August 3, 2026, Franklin was traded to the Baltimore Orioles in exchange for Joe Glassey. He made his MLB debut the following night as the starting left fielder in a 3–1 home win over the Los Angeles Angels. His first plate appearance in the third inning resulted in a leadoff walk and he eventually scored on a Pete Alonso single.
