= Zack Littell =

American baseball player (born 1995)

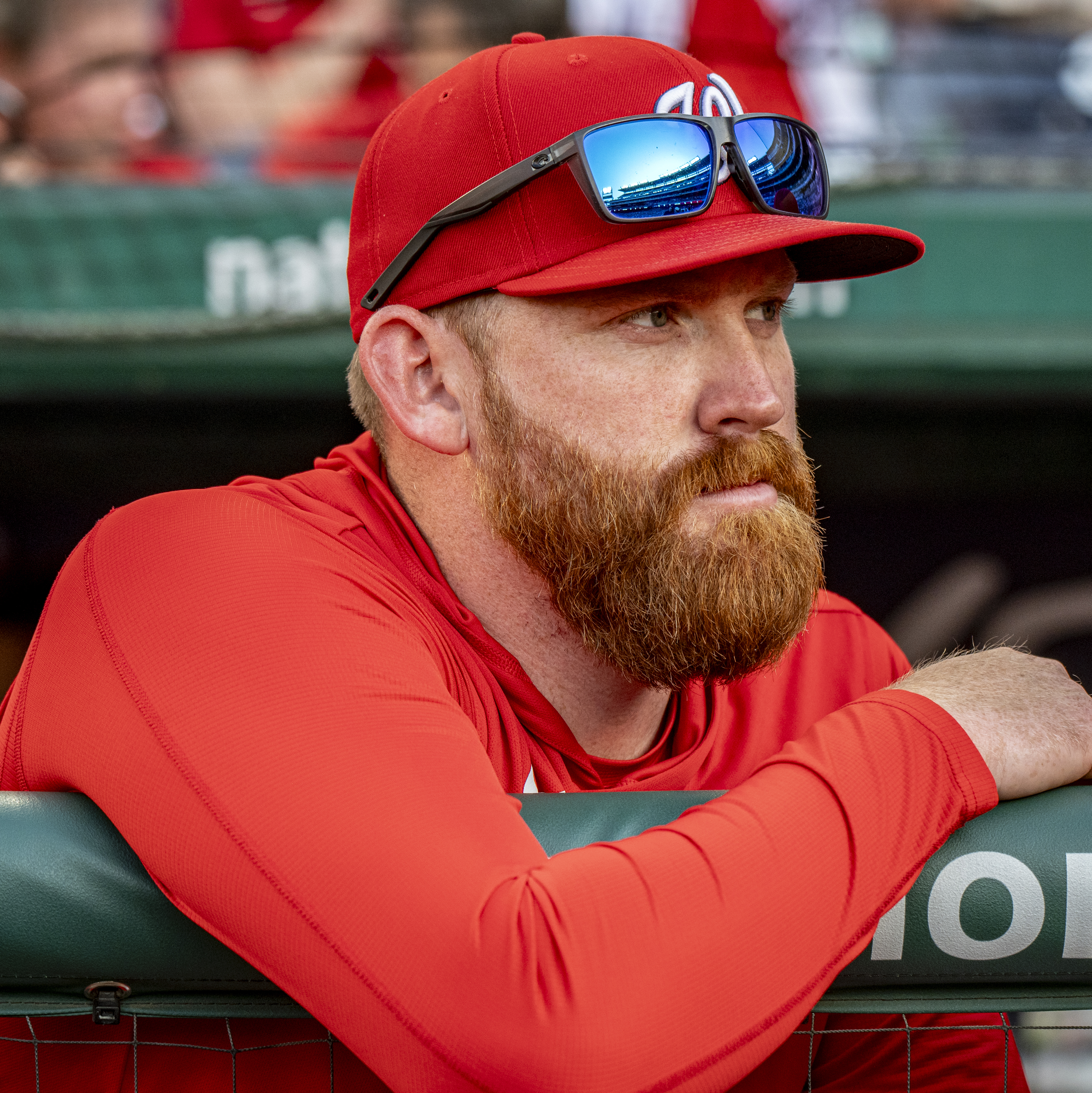
- Littell with the Washington Nationals in 2026

Free agent
- Pitcher
- Born: October 5, 1995 (age 31); Mebane, North Carolina, U.S.
- Bats: Right Throws: Right

MLB debut
- June 5, 2018, for the Minnesota Twins

MLB statistics (through August 22, 2026)
- Win–loss record: 42–37
- Earned run average: 4.11
- Strikeouts: 569
- Stats at Baseball Reference

Teams
- Minnesota Twins (2018–2020); San Francisco Giants (2021–2022); Boston Red Sox (2023); Tampa Bay Rays (2023–2025); Cincinnati Reds (2025); Washington Nationals (2026); Arizona Diamondbacks (2026)

Zachary Stuart Littell (born October 5, 1995) is an American professional baseball pitcher who is a free agent. He has previously played in Major League Baseball (MLB) for the Minnesota Twins, San Francisco Giants, Boston Red Sox, Tampa Bay Rays, Cincinnati Reds, Washington Nationals, and Arizona Diamondbacks. Littell was selected by the Seattle Mariners in the 11th round of the 2013 MLB draft and made his MLB debut with the Twins in 2018.

== Early life ==
Littell attended Eastern Alamance High School in Mebane, North Carolina.

== Professional career ==
=== Seattle Mariners (2013–2017) ===
The Seattle Mariners selected Littell in the 11th round of the 2013 Major League Baseball draft. He signed with Seattle, forgoing his commitment to play college baseball at Appalachian State University. Littell made his professional debut with the Rookie-level Arizona League Mariners. He was 0–6 with a 5.94 earned run average (ERA) and a 1.560 walks plus hits per inning pitched (WHIP) in 33 1/3 innings in 2013.

He pitched in 2014 for the Advanced Rookie League Pulaski Mariners, going 5–5 with a 4.52 ERA in 13 starts. Littell pitched in 2015 for the Single-A Clinton LumberKings, compiling a 3–6 record and 3.91 ERA in 21 starts.

He started 2016 with Clinton, and was promoted to the Bakersfield Blaze in July. In 28 total games (27 starts) between the two clubs, Littell collected a 13–6 record, 2.66 ERA, and 1.16 WHIP.

=== New York Yankees (2017) ===
On November 18, 2016, the Mariners traded Littell to the New York Yankees in exchange for pitcher James Pazos. Littell started 2017 with the Tampa Yankees and was promoted to the Trenton Thunder in late June.

=== Minnesota Twins (2017–2020) ===
On July 30, 2017, the Yankees traded Littell and pitcher Dietrich Enns to the Minnesota Twins in exchange for pitcher Jaime García and cash considerations. The Twins then assigned him to the Chattanooga Lookouts where he finished the season. In 27 total games (25 starts) between Tampa, Trenton, and Chattanooga, he went 19–1 with a 2.12 ERA and 1.12 WHIP. On November 20, the Twins added Littell to their 40-man roster to protect him from the Rule 5 draft.

Littell made his MLB debut on June 5, 2018. In eight games in the majors in 2018, Littell went 0–2 with a 6.20 ERA, 25 hits, 14 strikeouts, and 11 walks in 20 1/3 innings. In the minors, he was 6–9 with a 3.98 ERA and a 1.357 WHIP.

Littell moved to the bullpen full time in 2019. He went 6–0 in 29 games with a 2.68 ERA, 32 K, and 9 BB in 37 innings, while in the minors in 63 innings, he was 3–3 with a 3.71 ERA and 25 walks. He had a hard-hit rate of 52.5%.

In 2020 in 6 1/3 innings he gave up five home runs among 12 hits. He had a 9.95 ERA with a 2.368 WHIP. On September 17, 2020, Littell was outrighted off the 40-man roster. He became a free agent on November 2.

=== San Francisco Giants (2021–2022) ===
On February 3, 2021, Littell signed a minor league contract with the San Francisco Giants, and received an invitation to spring training. The Giants promoted him to the major leagues on April 30. In the 2021 regular season, Littell was 4–0 with a 2.92 ERA in 63 games (2 starts) covering 62 2/3 innings in which he struck out 63 batters with the Giants; with Triple-A Sacramento, he had a 9.00 ERA. His hard-hit percentage of 46.0% was in the bottom (worst) 5% of major league pitchers.

On September 13, 2022, Giants manager Gabe Kapler came to the pitcher's mound to remove Littell from a game, after Littell had given up two earned runs on three hits and a walk on only 15 pitches. Littell slammed the ball into Kapler's hand and angrily told Kapler he wanted to remain in the game. The next day, the Giants demoted him to the Triple-A Sacramento River Cats. In 2022, Littell was 3–3 with a 5.08 ERA and a 1.376 WHIP with the Giants. He was 0-1 with a 6.75 ERA with Triple-A Sacramento. The Giants waived him off the 40-man roster on November 9. When no team chose to pick him up, the Giants outrighted him to Sacramento. He elected free agency on November 10.

=== Texas Rangers (2023) ===
On January 12, 2023, Littell signed a minor league contract with the Texas Rangers organization. He began the year with the Triple-A Round Rock Express, for whom he made eight appearances and recorded a 2.25 ERA with 16 strikeouts in 12 innings pitched. The Rangers never called him up from the minor leagues.

=== Boston Red Sox (2023) ===
On May 5, 2023, Littell was traded to the Boston Red Sox in exchange for cash considerations. He was selected to Boston's active roster the next day. In two relief appearances for Boston, he surrendered three hits, three walks, and three runs in three innings pitched, for a 9.00 ERA. Littell was designated for assignment on May 10, five days after being acquired.

=== Tampa Bay Rays (2023–2025) ===
On May 12, 2023, Littell was claimed off waivers by the Tampa Bay Rays. He pitched for both the Triple–A Durham Bulls (with whom he was 0-1 with an 18.00 ERA) and the Rays, who converted him into a starting pitcher. On August 4, he threw a career-high 6 innings, allowing no runs and earning a win against the Detroit Tigers. He ended the season 3-6, with a 4.10 ERA and 74 strikeouts between the two major league teams.

In 2024, Littell made 29 starts for the Rays, posting a 3.63 ERA on the season with an 8-10 record and 141 strikeouts. Littell led the Rays in innings pitched for the season.

On May 31, 2025, Littell pitched a complete game against the Houston Astros; Littell gave up 10 hits and three earned runs while throwing 117 pitches. He made 22 starts for Tampa Bay, compiling an 8-8 record and 3.58 ERA with 89 strikeouts across 133 1/3 innings pitched.

=== Cincinnati Reds (2025) ===
On July 30, 2025, the Rays traded Littell to the Cincinnati Reds in exchange for Brian Van Belle and Adam Serwinowski. Littell made 10 starts for the Reds, compiling a 2-0 record and 4.39 ERA with 41 strikeouts across 53 1/3 innings pitched.

=== Washington Nationals (2026) ===
On March 10, 2026, Littell signed a one-year, $7 million contract with the Washington Nationals, that included performance incentives and a mutual option for the 2027 season. He made 23 appearances (including 14 starts) for Washington, compiling a 7–8 record and 4.97 ERA with 70 strikeouts across 112 1/3 innings pitched. Littell was designated for assignment by the Nationals on August 5; he was released two days later.

=== Arizona Diamondbacks (2026) ===
On August 10, 2026, Littell signed a major league contract with the Arizona Diamondbacks. Following the signing, it was reported that Littell would work primarily as a relief pitcher. In three appearances for the team, he posted a 1–0 record and 7.50 ERA with three strikeouts over 12 innings of work. Littell was designated for assignment by the Diamondbacks on August 23 and was released on August 26.
