= Trey Gibson =

American baseball player (born 2002)

Baltimore Orioles – No. 43
- Pitcher
- Born: May 18, 2002 (age 24); Newport News, Virginia, U.S.
- Bats: Right Throws: Right

MLB debut
- May 3, 2026, for the Baltimore Orioles

MLB statistics (through 2026 season)
- Win–loss record: 2-3
- Earned run average: 6.13
- Strikeouts: 37
- Stats at Baseball Reference

Teams
- Baltimore Orioles (2026–present)

Richard Russell Gibson (born May 18, 2002) is an American professional baseball pitcher for the Baltimore Orioles of Major League Baseball (MLB). He made his MLB debut in 2026.

== Amateur career ==
Gibson attended Grafton High School in Yorktown, Virginia and played college baseball at Liberty University. He was suspended by Liberty for the entirety of the 2023 season and did not make an appearance. In 2023, he played collegiate summer baseball with the Chatham Anglers of the Cape Cod Baseball League.

== Professional career ==
Gibson signed with the Baltimore Orioles as an undrafted free agent after going unselected in the 2023 Major League Baseball draft. Gibson made his professional debut with the rookie-level Florida Complex League Orioles. He played 2024 with the Delmarva Shorebirds and Aberdeen IronBirds. He started 2025 with Aberdeen before being promoted to the Chesapeake Baysox.

Gibson was assigned to the Triple-A Norfolk Tides to begin the 2026 season, posting a 2-2 record and 4.01 ERA with 25 strikeouts over six starts. On May 3, 2026, Gibson was promoted to the major leagues for the first time. He made his MLB debut later that day against the New York Yankees, allowing three earned runs on four hits over 4 2/3 innings pitched. On May 27, Gibson recorded his first career win after allowing one run across 5 2/3 innings pitched against the Tampa Bay Rays.
