= Anthony Nunez =

American baseball player (born 2001)

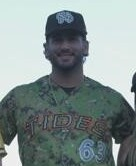
- Nunez with the Norfolk Tides in 2025

Baltimore Orioles – No. 66
- Pitcher
- Born: July 10, 2001 (age 25); Miami, Florida, U.S.
- Bats: Switch Throws: Right

MLB debut
- March 28, 2026, for the Baltimore Orioles

MLB statistics (through 2026 season)
- Win–loss record: 3–2
- Earned run average: 4.07
- Strikeouts: 66
- Stats at Baseball Reference

Teams
- Baltimore Orioles (2026–present)

Anthony Nunez (born July 10, 2001) is an American professional baseball pitcher for the Baltimore Orioles of Major League Baseball (MLB). He made his MLB debut in 2026.

== Career ==
=== San Diego Padres ===
Nunez attended Miami Springs Senior High School in Miami Springs, Florida. He was selected by the San Diego Padres in the 29th round (863rd overall) of the 2019 Major League Baseball draft as an infielder. Nunez signed with the Padres and made his professional debut that year with the rookie-level Arizona League Padres. He did not play in a game in 2020 due to the cancellation of the minor league season because of the COVID-19 pandemic.

Nunez returned to action in 2021 with the rookie-level Arizona Complex League Padres and Single-A Lake Elsinore Storm. He made 26 appearances for the two affiliates, batting a cumulative .208/.376/.361 with two home runs, 16 RBI, and three stolen bases. Nunez was released by the Padres organization on August 21, 2021.

=== University of Tampa ===
Following his release from the Padres organization, Nunez was ruled eligible to play Division II college baseball at the University of Tampa. In 2022, he played collegiate summer baseball with the Chatham Anglers of the Cape Cod Baseball League. After playing the infield for two years at Tampa, Nunez was also a pitcher his final season in 2024, becoming a two-way player.

=== New York Mets ===
Nunez signed with the New York Mets as an undrafted free agent on June 14, 2024. He spent the remainder of the year with the rookie-level Florida Complex League Mets and Single-A St. Lucie Mets, recording a combined 2.70 ERA with 12 strikeouts across nine appearances.

Nunez started 2025 with the High-A Brooklyn Cyclones before being promoted to the Double-A Binghamton Rumble Ponies, where he logged a 2.10 ERA with 36 strikeouts in 22 games.

=== Baltimore Orioles ===
On July 31, 2025, the Mets traded Nunez, Raimon Gómez, and Chandler Marsh to the Baltimore Orioles in exchange for Cedric Mullins. He made one scoreless appearance for the Double-A Chesapeake Baysox before being promoted to the Triple-A Norfolk Tides, for whom he logged a 1-4 record and 3.45 ERA with 21 strikeouts and four saves across 16 games. On November 6, the Orioles added Nunez to their 40-man roster to prevent him from reaching minor league free agency.

Nunez was initially optioned to Triple-A Norfolk to begin the 2026 season. However, on March 25, 2026, it was announced that Nunez had made the team's Opening Day roster. On March 28, he made his MLB debut in a game against the Minnesota Twins, pitching two innings in relief without giving up a hit or a run, and striking out three. On April 22, Nunez recorded his first career save after tossing a scoreless ninth inning against the Kansas City Royals.
