= Josh Walker (baseball) =

American baseball player (born 1994)

Baltimore Orioles – No. 61
- Pitcher
- Born: December 1, 1994 (age 31); Otisville, New York, U.S.
- Bats: Left Throws: Left

MLB debut
- May 16, 2023, for the New York Mets

MLB statistics (through 2026 season)
- Win–loss record: 1–1
- Earned run average: 4.21
- Strikeouts: 60
- Stats at Baseball Reference

Teams
- New York Mets (2023–2024); Toronto Blue Jays (2025); Baltimore Orioles (2026–present)

Joshua Todd Walker (born December 1, 1994) is an American professional baseball pitcher for the Baltimore Orioles of Major League Baseball (MLB). He has previously played in MLB for the New York Mets and Toronto Blue Jays. He made his MLB debut in 2023.

== Amateur career ==
Walker attended Minisink Valley High School in Slate Hill, New York, where he played football, baseball, and swam. As a senior, he had a 2.60 earned run average (ERA). After high school, he played college baseball for two seasons at the University of South Florida before transferring to the University of New Haven in 2016. In 2017, his senior season at New Haven, he had a 3–1 record and a 2.40 ERA over thirty innings.

== Professional career ==
=== New York Mets ===
After the season, Walker was selected by the New York Mets in the 37th round of the 2017 Major League Baseball draft. He signed and made his professional debut with the Rookie-level Gulf Coast League Mets where he posted a 9.42 ERA over 14 1/3 innings. In 2018, he played with the Kingsport Mets of the Rookie-level Appalachian League before being promoted to the Brooklyn Cyclones of the Low-A New York–Penn League, pitching to a 3.27 ERA with 52 strikeouts over 41 1/3 innings. Walker pitched only six innings in 2019 after being in a car accident that injured his left arm, and he did not play a game in 2020 after the minor league season was cancelled due to the COVID-19 pandemic.

To begin the 2021 season, Walker was assigned to Brooklyn (now members of the High-A East) and was promoted to the Binghamton Rumble Ponies of the Double-A Northeast and the Syracuse Mets of the Triple-A East during the season. Over 21 games (twenty starts) between the three clubs, Walker pitched to a 9–4 record, a 3.73 ERA, and 98 strikeouts over 115 2/3 innings. He returned to Syracuse to begin the 2022 season on the injured list. He made rehab appearances with the Florida Complex League Mets and the St. Lucie Mets before he was assigned to Syracuse; over 22 innings pitched for the season between the three teams, he went 3–2 with a 4.91 ERA and 38 strikeouts.

Walker began the 2023 season with Syracuse, where he made nine appearances and logged a 0.68 ERA with 18 strikeouts in 13 1/3 innings pitched. On May 16, 2023, Walker was selected to the 40-man roster and promoted to the major leagues for the first time. In 14 games for the Mets, he struggled to an 8.10 ERA with 12 strikeouts in 10 innings of work. On August 14, Walker was placed on the injured list with a right oblique strain. He was transferred to the 60–day injured list on August 17.

Walker was optioned to Triple-A Syracuse to begin the 2024 season. In 10 games for the Mets, he recorded a 5.11 ERA with 11 strikeouts across 12 1/3 innings pitched. Walker was designated for assignment following the acquisition of Ryne Stanek on July 26.

=== Pittsburgh Pirates ===
On July 30, 2024, Walker was traded to the Pittsburgh Pirates in exchange for Nicolas Carreno. After one appearance for the Triple-A Indianapolis Indians, the Pirates designated Walker for assignment on August 9. He was released by the organization the next day. Walker re-signed with the Pirates on a minor league contract on August 15. He elected free agency following the season on November 4.

=== Toronto Blue Jays ===
On December 20, 2024, Walker signed a one–year, $760,000 contract with the Toronto Blue Jays. He was optioned to the Triple-A Buffalo Bisons to begin the 2025 season. In three appearances for Toronto, Walker recorded a 7.20 ERA with eight strikeouts over five innings of work. On May 25, 2025, Walker was designated for assignment following the promotion of Ali Sánchez.

=== Philadelphia Phillies ===
On May 29, 2025, Walker was traded to the Philadelphia Phillies in exchange for cash considerations. In 23 appearances for the Triple-A Lehigh Valley IronPigs, he logged a 2–1 record and 4.50 ERA with 22 strikeouts over 26 innings of work. On August 19, Walker was designated for assignment by the Phillies.

=== Baltimore Orioles ===
On August 21, 2025, Walker was claimed off waivers by the Baltimore Orioles. In six appearances for the Triple-A Norfolk Tides, he recorded a 2.70 ERA with seven strikeouts across 6 2/3 innings pitched. Walker was designated for assignment by the Orioles on November 6.

On November 13, 2025, Walker was claimed off waivers by the Atlanta Braves. He was designated for assignment by the Braves on December 5. On December 10, Walker was claimed back off waivers by the Orioles. He was designated for assignment following the acquisition of Shane Baz on December 19. Walker cleared waivers and was sent outright to Norfolk on January 7, 2026. He was assigned to Triple-A Norfolk to begin the regular season. On May 11, the Orioles selected Walker's contract, adding him to their active roster. He was optioned and recalled by the Orioles multiple times, with his final call-up being on July 24. He made a total of 31 relief appearances for Baltimore and ended the season with a 1–0 record, a 2.08 ERA, and 29 strikeouts across 30 1/3 innings.
