= Dietrich Enns =

American baseball player (born 1991)

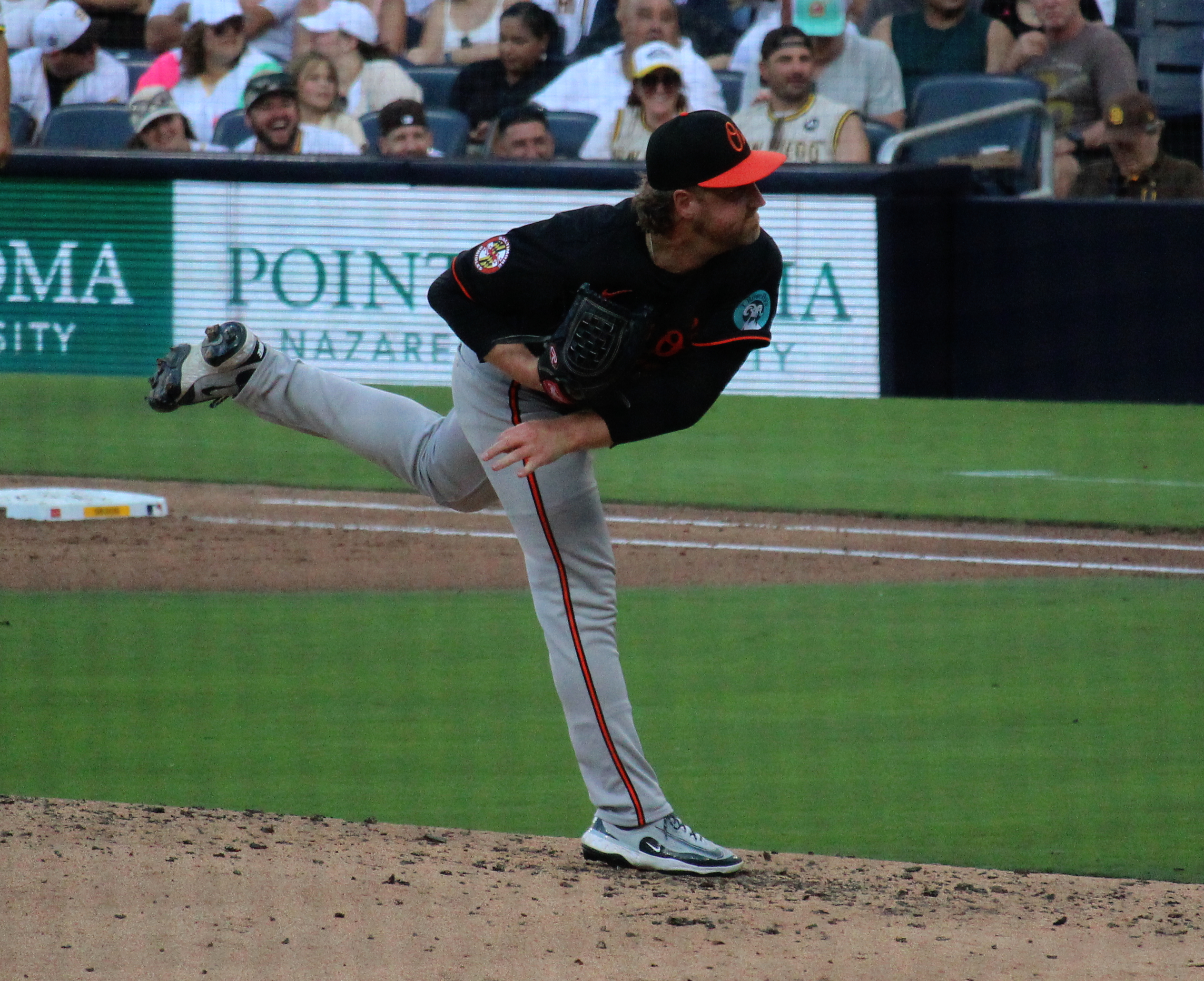
- Enns with the Baltimore Orioles in 2025

Free agent
- Pitcher
- Born: May 16, 1991 (age 35); Frankfort, Illinois, U.S.
- Bats: Left Throws: Left

Professional debut
- MLB: August 10, 2017, for the Minnesota Twins
- NPB: April 10, 2022, for the Saitama Seibu Lions
- KBO: March 23, 2024, for the LG Twins

MLB statistics (through May 25, 2026)
- Win–loss record: 8–3
- Earned run average: 3.86
- Strikeouts: 89

NPB statistics (through 2023 season)
- Win–loss record: 11–17
- Earned run average: 3.62
- Strikeouts: 122

KBO statistics (through 2024 season)
- Win–loss record: 13–6
- Earned run average: 4.19
- Strikeouts: 157
- Stats at Baseball Reference

Teams
- Minnesota Twins (2017); Tampa Bay Rays (2021); Saitama Seibu Lions (2022–2023); LG Twins (2024); Detroit Tigers (2025); Baltimore Orioles (2025–2026)

Dietrich Arthur Enns (born May 16, 1991) is an American professional baseball pitcher who is a free agent. He has previously played in Major League Baseball (MLB) for the Minnesota Twins, Tampa Bay Rays, Detroit Tigers, and Baltimore Orioles, and in Nippon Professional Baseball (NPB) for the Saitama Seibu Lions, and in the KBO League for the LG Twins.

== Amateur career ==
Enns attended Lincoln-Way East High School in Frankfort, Illinois, and Central Michigan University. He played college baseball for the Central Michigan Chippewas. In 2011, he played collegiate summer baseball with the Hyannis Harbor Hawks of the Cape Cod Baseball League, and was named a league all-star. In 2010, he was named the Mid-American Conference's Freshman of the Year after allowing the fewest hits per nine innings in NCAA Division I and posting the fifth-best earned run average in Division I.

== Professional career ==
=== New York Yankees ===
The New York Yankees selected Enns in the 19th round of the 2012 Major League Baseball draft. He made his professional debut for the Staten Island Yankees. In 22 games, he had a 2–0 win–loss record with a 2.11 earned run average (ERA) and 33 strikeouts over 42 2/3 innings. He started the 2013 season with the Charleston RiverDogs and was a Mid-Season All-Star. He was promoted to the Class A-Advanced Tampa Yankees in June of that year. Overall, he pitched in 28 games with eight starts, and went 4–6 with a 2.94 ERA and 112 strikeouts in 82 2/3 innings.

In 2014, he stayed with Tampa where he posted a 1.42 ERA in 13 games and 25 1/3 innings, but his season was ended by an injury which required Tommy John surgery. He returned in June 2015, to pitch with the Gulf Coast League Yankees and the Tampa Yankees, where he put up a 0.61 ERA and 55 strikeouts in 58 2/3 innings between the two clubs. Whereas Enns had primarily appeared out of the bullpen prior to his surgery, he made 12 starts in his 13 games in 2015.

In 2016, Enns made both his Double-A and Triple-A debuts, moving back and forth between the Trenton Thunder and Scranton/Wilkes-Barre RailRiders. He put up a 1.73 ERA in 22 starts between the two levels, striking out 124 in 135 innings. He earned Eastern League Player of the Month honors in April and was a Mid-Season All-Star.

=== Minnesota Twins ===
On July 30, 2017, the Yankees traded Enns and Zack Littell to the Minnesota Twins in exchange for Jaime García and cash consideration. He pitched in three games with the Rochester Red Wings before he was promoted to the big leagues. He made his major league debut on August 10, where he allowed one earned run on five hits over 2.1 innings in a start against the Milwaukee Brewers. Enns made a relief appearance on August 15, where he allowed two runs on two hits in 1.2 innings of work against the Cleveland Indians. Enns was scheduled to start again on August 20, but instead was placed on the disabled list with a strained shoulder, having allowed three earned runs in four innings. Enns made two rehab starts with Rochester, and then was activated and optioned to the Double-A Chattanooga Lookouts in September.

Enns began the 2018 season with the RedWings, again working as a starter. After putting up a 4.50 ERA in 20 innings over four starts, Enns was designated for assignment on May 1 and was outrighted to Triple-A Rochester. He finished the season with a 4.60 ERA in 22 starts between Rochester and Chattanooga, posting 106 strikeouts in 129 innings. Enns elected free agency following the season on November 2.

=== San Diego Padres ===
On November 29, 2018, Enns signed a minor league contract with the San Diego Padres. In 28 games (25 starts) for the Triple–A El Paso Chihuahuas in 2019, he was 11–11 with a 6.70 ERA and 105 strikeouts, and led the minor leagues in home runs given up (37). Enns elected free agency following the season on November 4, 2019.

=== Seattle Mariners ===
On January 29, 2020, Enns signed a minor league deal with the Seattle Mariners. On May 27, Enns was released by the Mariners organization amid the COVID-19 pandemic.

After his release, Enns pitched 18 innings for the independent Tully Monsters, allowing only 2 runs and 10 hits.

=== Tampa Bay Rays ===
On August 18, 2020, Enns signed a minor league deal with the Tampa Bay Rays. On August 3, 2021, the Rays selected Enns' contract. In his Rays debut on August 7, Enns tossed one scoreless inning against the Baltimore Orioles. Enns was released by the Rays on November 17, 2021, after recording a 2.82 ERA in 22 1/3 innings.

=== Saitama Seibu Lions ===
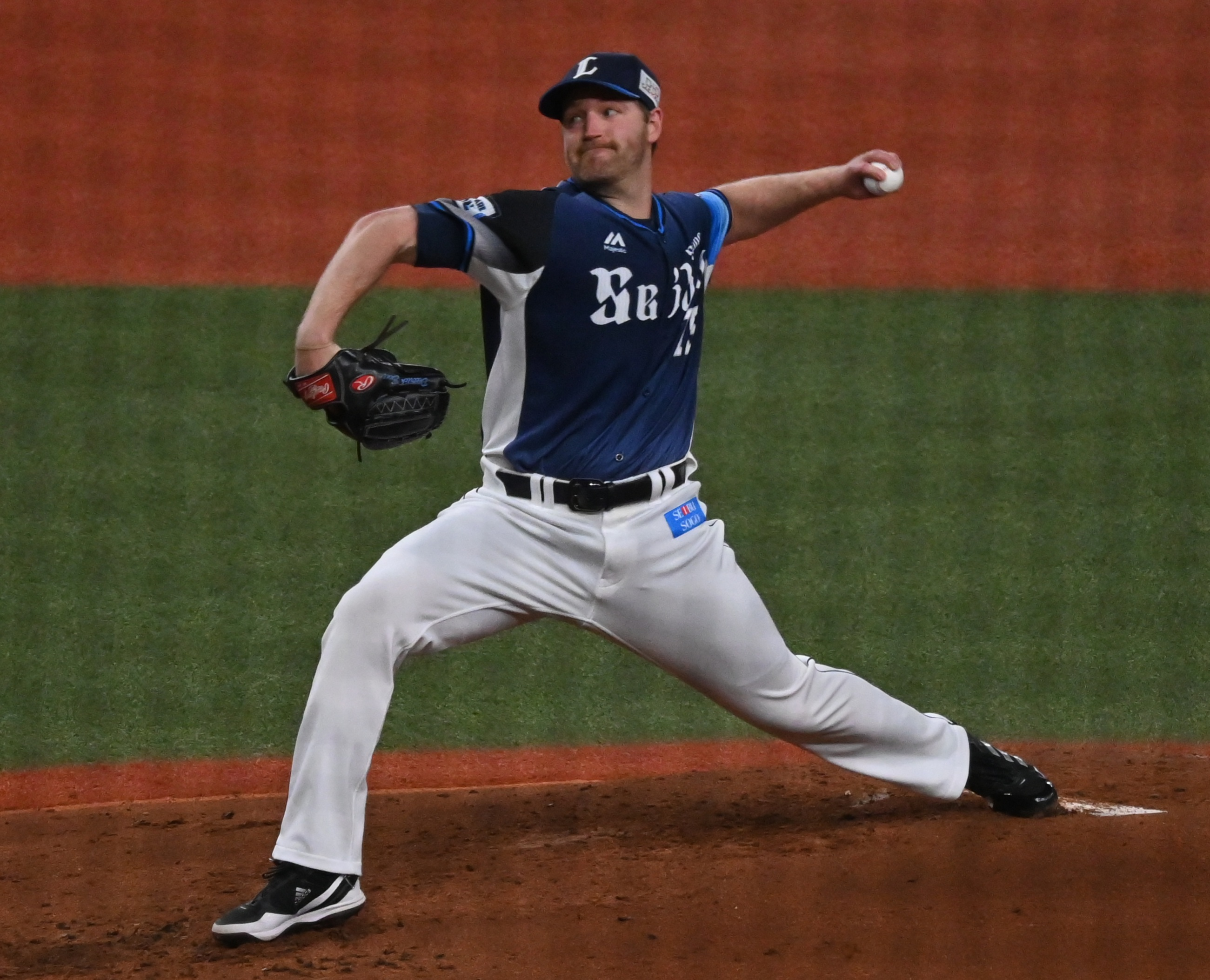
Enns in 2022

On November 23, 2021, Enns signed with the Saitama Seibu Lions of Nippon Professional Baseball. In 2022, Enns pitched in 23 games, going 10–7 with a 2.94 ERA and 92 strikeouts in 122 1/3 innings of work. He became the first non-Japanese left-handed pitcher for the franchise to win 10 games in a season since Marion O’Neil in 1953. He also became the third non-Japanese pitcher to win 10 games for the Lions in his first NPB season. He became a free agent following the 2023 season.

=== LG Twins ===
On November 19, 2023, Enns signed a one–year, $1 million contract with the LG Twins of the KBO League. In 33 starts for the Twins in 2024, he posted a 13–6 record with a 4.19 ERA and 157 strikeouts over 167 2/3 innings. Enns became a free agent following the season.

=== Detroit Tigers ===
On December 15, 2024, Enns announced he had agreed to a minor league contract with the Detroit Tigers on Instagram. On January 7, 2025, he formally signed with the team. In 14 starts for the Triple-A Toledo Mud Hens, Enns logged a 2–2 record and 2.89 ERA with 71 strikeouts across 62 1/3 innings pitched. The Tigers selected Enns' contract on June 26, and named him the starting pitcher for that day. In his first MLB game since September of 2021, he pitched five shutout innings against the Athletics, and earned the win. In seven appearances (two starts) for Detroit, Enns compiled a 1-1 record and 5.60 ERA with 15 strikeouts across 17 2/3 innings pitched.

=== Baltimore Orioles ===
On July 31, 2025, Enns was designated for assignment by the Tigers. He was traded later that same day to the Baltimore Orioles in exchange for cash considerations. Enns made 17 appearances down the stretch for Baltimore, compiling a 2-2 record and 3.14 ERA with 34 strikeouts and two saves across 28 2/3 innings pitched.

Enns pitched in 13 games for Baltimore in 2026, logging a 3-0 record and 3.94 ERA with 13 strikeouts over 16 innings of work. On May 26, 2026, Enns was designated for assignment by the Orioles. He cleared waivers and was sent outright to the Triple-A Norfolk Tides on May 31. On November 2, the Orioles declined their contract option on Enns making him a free agent.

== Personal life ==
Enns and his wife, Julie Anne, married in 2019. In May 2022, while playing for Seibu Lions in Japan, he graduated Northeastern University through its online degree program.
