= Yaramil Hiraldo =

Dominican baseball player (born 1995)

Baltimore Orioles – No. 76
- Pitcher
- Born: December 31, 1995 (age 30); Santiago, Dominican Republic
- Bats: Right Throws: Right

MLB debut
- May 27, 2025, for the Baltimore Orioles

MLB statistics (through 2026 season)
- Win–loss record: 1–0
- Earned run average: 5.90
- Strikeouts: 34
- Stats at Baseball Reference

Teams
- Baltimore Orioles (2025–present)

Yaramil Junior Hiraldo (born December 31, 1995) is a Dominican professional baseball pitcher for the Baltimore Orioles of Major League Baseball (MLB). He made his MLB debut in 2025.

== Career ==
=== Arizona Diamondbacks ===
On June 5, 2018, Hiraldo signed with the Arizona Diamondbacks as an international free agent. He made his professional debut with the Dominican Summer League Diamondbacks. Hiraldo split the 2019 campaign between the Low-A Hillsboro Hops and Single-A Kane County Cougars. In 23 appearances for the two affiliates, he compiled a cumulative 2–1 record and 1.01 ERA with 32 strikeouts across 35 2/3 innings pitched.

Hiraldo did not play in a game in 2020 due to the cancellation of the minor league season because of the COVID-19 pandemic. He returned to action in 2021 with Hillsboro, now a High-A affiliate, and recorded a 4.13 ERA with 25 strikeouts and nine saves across 19 appearances out of the bullpen. Hiraldo was released by the Diamondbacks organization on March 26, 2022.

=== Lexington Legends ===
On April 20, 2022, Hiraldo signed with the Lexington Legends of the Atlantic League of Professional Baseball. In his 50 relief appearances for Lexington, he registered an 0–1 record and 5.83 ERA with 78 strikeouts over 54 innings of work. Hiraldo was released by the Legends on September 18.

=== Charleston Dirty Birds ===
On July 24, 2023, Hiraldo signed with the Charleston Dirty Birds of the Atlantic League of Professional Baseball. In 11 appearances for Charleston, he logged a 1–0 record and 1.64 ERA with 11 strikeouts and five saves across 11 innings pitched.

=== Staten Island FerryHawks ===
On September 1, 2023, Hiraldo was traded to the Staten Island FerryHawks in exchange for a player to be named later. In seven appearances for Staten Island, Hiraldo recorded a 1.29 ERA with eight strikeouts and two saves over seven innings pitched.

=== Caliente de Durango ===
On May 26, 2024, Hiraldo signed with the Caliente de Durango of the Mexican League. In 24 appearances for Durango, he posted a 3–0 record and 2.05 ERA with 27 strikeouts across 22 innings pitched.

=== Baltimore Orioles ===
On October 31, 2024, Hiraldo signed a minor league contract with the Baltimore Orioles organization. He began the 2025 season with the Triple-A Norfolk Tides, also appearing for the High-A Aberdeen IronBirds and Double-A Chesapeake Baysox.

On May 24, 2025, Hiraldo was selected to the 40-man roster and promoted to the major leagues for the first time. He made his debut on May 27, against the St. Louis Cardinals. Before Hiraldo could throw his first pitch, he received a pitch clock violation; he later struck out Iván Herrera for his first career strikeout. Hiraldo made 18 appearances for the Orioles during his rookie season, recording a 4.58 ERA with 21 strikeouts across 19 2/3 innings pitched.

Hiraldo made Baltimore's Opening Day roster entering the 2026 campaign. In his first three appearances, he struggled to a 21.60 ERA with two strikeouts over 1 2/3 innings. On April 3, 2026, Hiraldo was placed on the injured list due to right shoulder inflammation. He was transferred to the 60-day injured list on April 13. On July 11, Hiraldo was activated and optioned to Triple–A Norfolk. On August 9, Hiraldo recorded his first career win, tossing two scoreless innings of relief against the Texas Rangers.
