= Drew French =

American baseball coach (born 1984)

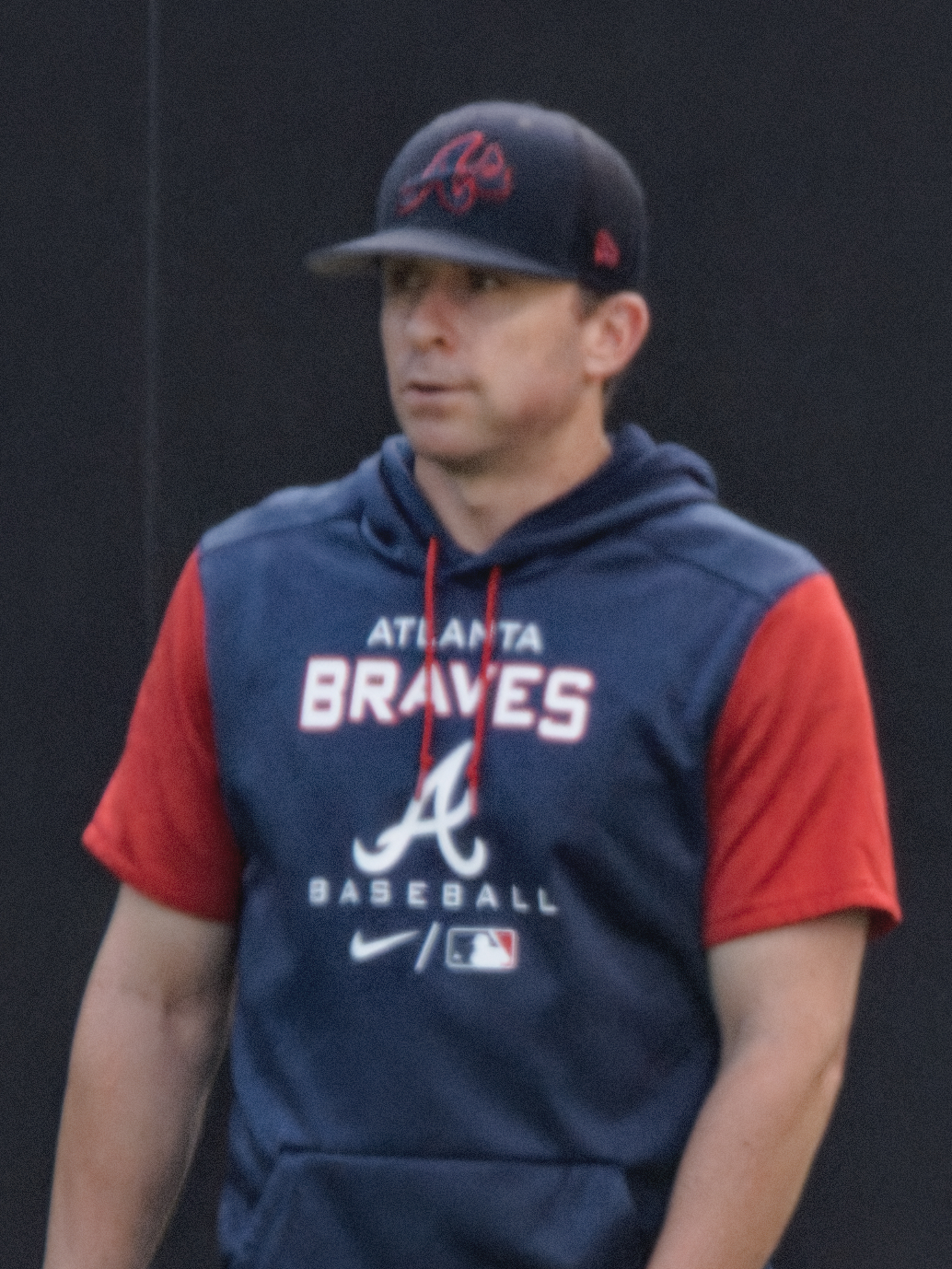
- French with the Braves in 2022

Baltimore Orioles – No. 58
- Coach
- Born: July 19, 1984 (age 42); Seguin, Texas, U.S.

Teams
- As coach: Atlanta Braves (2021–2023); Baltimore Orioles (2024–present)

Career highlights and awards
- World Series champion (2021)

Drew C. French (born July 19, 1984) is an American professional baseball coach who is currently the pitching coach for the Baltimore Orioles of Major League Baseball (MLB).

== Coaching career ==
French was the head coach and camp coordinator of the Austin SLAM Baseball program while he was a relief pitcher at Concordia University Texas. He was named a volunteer assistant at Alabama in 2007 and was promoted to the Crimson Tide's director of baseball operations in 2009. In the summer of 2009, he served as the pitching coach for the North Fork Ospreys of the Hamptons Collegiate Baseball League. French was named the pitching coach at Florida International in 2011, and at Lee University in 2014.

French joined the Houston Astros organization in 2016, and served as the pitching coach of the organization's Triple-A affiliate in 2019.

=== Atlanta Braves ===
French was named the bullpen coach for the Atlanta Braves on December 18, 2020.

=== Baltimore Orioles ===
On November 29, 2023, French was hired by the Baltimore Orioles to serve as the team's pitching coach.
