= Jeremiah Jackson =

American baseball player (born 2000)

Baltimore Orioles – No. 82
- Infielder
- Born: March 26, 2000 (age 26); Nashville, Tennessee, U.S.
- Bats: Right Throws: Right

MLB debut
- August 1, 2025, for the Baltimore Orioles

MLB statistics (through 2026 season)
- Batting average: .239
- Home runs: 15
- Runs batted in: 66
- Stats at Baseball Reference

Teams
- Baltimore Orioles (2025–present)

Jeremiah Jackson (born March 26, 2000) is an American professional baseball infielder for the Baltimore Orioles of Major League Baseball (MLB). He made his MLB debut in 2025.

== Amateur career ==
Jackson attended St. Luke's Episcopal School in Mobile, Alabama, where he played baseball. He committed to play college baseball at Mississippi State University prior to his sophomore year. As a senior in 2018, he batted .637 with 15 home runs and 49 RBI in 34 games and was named Alabama Mr. Baseball.

== Professional career ==
=== Los Angeles Angels ===
The Los Angeles Angels selected Jackson in the second round, with the 57th overall selection, of the 2018 Major League Baseball draft. He signed with the Angels and made his professional debut that year with the Rookie-level Arizona League Angels before being promoted to the Orem Owls of the Rookie Advanced Pioneer League. Over 43 games between the two affiliates, he batted .254 with seven home runs, 23 RBI, and ten stolen bases. In 2019, Jackson returned to Orem, slashing .266/.333/.605 with 23 home runs and sixty RBI over 65 games, earning Pioneer League All-Star honors. His 23 home runs tied the Pioneer League single-season record. Jackson did not play in a game in 2020 due to the cancellation of the minor league season because of the COVID-19 pandemic.

Jackson was assigned to the Inland Empire 66ers of the Low-A West for the 2021 season. He missed over two months due to a quad strain. Over 45 games with the 66ers, Jackson slashed .263/.352/.527 with eight home runs and 46 RBI. He was selected to play in the Arizona Fall League for the Glendale Desert Dogs after the season. Jackson was assigned to the Rocket City Trash Pandas of the Double-A Southern League to begin the 2022 season. After two games, he was placed on the injured list; he returned in late May. Over 87 games with Rocket City, Jackson batted .215 with 14 home runs and 44 RBI. Jackson returned to Rocket City to open the 2023 season.

=== New York Mets ===
On August 1, 2023, the Angels traded Jackson to the New York Mets in exchange for Dominic Leone. The Mets assigned him to the Binghamton Rumble Ponies of the Double-A Eastern League. Over 119 games between Rocket City and Binghamton, Jackson hit .252 with 22 home runs, eighty RBI, and 27 stolen bases. Jackson spent the 2024 season with Binghamton, batting .205 with 19 home runs and 61 RBI over 121 games. He elected free agency following the season on November 4, 2024.

=== Baltimore Orioles ===
On November 25, 2024, Jackson signed a minor league contract with the Baltimore Orioles organization. He was assigned to the Double-A Chesapeake Baysox to open the 2025 season and was promoted to the Triple-A Norfolk Tides in June. On July 25, 2025, Jackson was selected to the 40-man roster and promoted to the major leagues for the first time. He was optioned back to Norfolk the following day without making an appearance, briefly becoming a phantom ballplayer. At Norfolk, he hit .377 with 11 home runs over forty games.

Jackson was promoted to the major leagues for a second time on July 31, 2025. Jackson made his MLB debut on August 1, at Wrigley Field versus the Chicago Cubs. He, Jackson Holliday, and Alex Jackson played for the Orioles on August 3 in a game at Wrigley Field. This was the first time in MLB's Modern Era (since 1900) that a team started at least three players whose given name or surname was Jackson. Remarkably, the three Jacksons combined to throw out a runner at the plate, nailing Carson Kelly to end the first inning in a 5–3 loss to the Chicago Cubs. It was a 9-4-2 putout, Jeremiah Jackson to Jackson Holliday to Alex Jackson. Jeremiah Jackson recorded his first MLB hit during the game, a single off Cade Horton. He hit his first MLB home run off of AJ Blubaugh of the Houston Astros on August 23. Jackson played the remainder of the season with Baltimore following his promotion, and hit .276 with five home runs and 21 RBI across 48 games.

In 2026, Jackson was named to his first ever Opening Day roster for the Orioles as a utility player. On April 13, he hit his first career grand slam off Arizona Diamondbacks relief pitcher Taylor Rashi. Jackson was optioned to Norfolk for the first time during the season on June 28. He was quickly recalled on July 3 before he was optioned once again on August 19. Jackson was recalled for a final time on September 9. Jackson appeared in 102 games for Baltimore and batted .217 with ten home runs and 45 RBI.
