= 2026 Arizona Diamondbacks season =

2026 Arizona Diamondbacks
- League: National League
- Division: West
- Ballpark: Chase Field
- City: Phoenix, Arizona
- Record: 86–76 (.531)
- Divisional place: 3rd
- Owner: Ken Kendrick
- General manager: Mike Hazen
- Manager: Torey Lovullo
- Television: MLB Local Media; Games distributed to local cable providers like YurView Arizona
- Radio: KMVP-FM (98.7)
- Stats: ESPN.com; Baseball Reference

The 2026 Arizona Diamondbacks season was the franchise's 29th season in Major League Baseball and their 29th season at Chase Field in Phoenix, Arizona, as members of the National League West. They were managed by Torey Lovullo in his tenth season with the franchise.

On September 27 (the last day of the season), the Diamondbacks were eliminated from playoff contention, and extending their drought of a playoff spot to three seasons.

== Offseason ==
The Diamondbacks finished the 2025 season with a record of 80–82, which was down from their 89–73 from 2024. They missed the playoffs for the second consecutive season.

=== Transactions ===
==== November 2025 ====
November 2	RHP Zac Gallen, LHP Jalen Beeks and C James McCann elected free agency.
November 6	2B Ildemaro Vargas elected free agency.
November 21	C James McCann re-signed with the Diamondbacks to a 1-year, $2.75 million contract.

==== December 2025 ====
December 12	Diamondbacks signed right-handed pitcher Michael Soroka to a 1-year, $7.5 million contract.
December 19	Philadelphia Phillies traded minor league OF Avery Owusu-Asiedu to Arizona Diamondbacks for RHP Kyle Backhus.
December 19	Diamondbacks signed right-handed pitcher Merrill Kelly to a 2-year, $40 million contract.

==== January 2026 ====
January 13	St. Louis Cardinals traded 3B Nolan Arenado & $31 million for RHP Jack Martinez.
January 15	Signed RHP Taylor Clarke

==== February 2026 ====
February 5	Baltimore Orioles traded RHP Kade Strowd, Wellington Aracena and Jose Mejia for INF Blaze Alexander.
February 10	Diamondbacks signed 1B Carlos Santana to a 1-year, $2.0 million contract.

==== May 2026 ====
May 12	Los Angeles Dodgers traded OF Jose Requena for OF Alek Thomas.

==== June 2026 ====
May 12	Diamondbacks signed OF Max Kepler to a 1-year contract.

==== August 2026 ====
August 3	St. Louis Cardinals traded OF Lars Nootbaar for RHP Daniel Eagen, Sandro Santana, and a player to be named later.
August 10	Signed RHP Zack Littell to a Major League Contract.

== Season standings ==
=== National League West ===
NL West
Team	W	L	Pct.	GB	Home	Road
Los Angeles Dodgers	100	62	.617	—	51‍–‍30	49‍–‍32
San Diego Padres	91	71	.562	9	51‍–‍30	40‍–‍41
Arizona Diamondbacks	86	76	.531	14	45‍–‍36	41‍–‍40
San Francisco Giants	65	97	.401	35	37‍–‍44	28‍–‍53
Colorado Rockies	58	104	.358	42	32‍–‍49	26‍–‍55

=== National League Wild Card ===
Division leaders
Team	W	L	Pct.
Milwaukee Brewers	103	59	.636
Los Angeles Dodgers	100	62	.617
Atlanta Braves	94	68	.580

Wild Card teams (Top 3 teams qualify for postseason)
Team	W	L	Pct.	GB
San Diego Padres	91	71	.562	+3
Chicago Cubs	89	73	.549	+1
Philadelphia Phillies	88	74	.543	—
Arizona Diamondbacks	86	76	.531	2
Pittsburgh Pirates	82	80	.506	6
Miami Marlins	80	82	.494	8
St. Louis Cardinals	77	85	.475	11
Washington Nationals	77	85	.475	11
Cincinnati Reds	75	87	.463	13
New York Mets	74	88	.457	14
San Francisco Giants	65	97	.401	23
Colorado Rockies	58	104	.358	30

==== Record vs. opponents ====
2026 National League record Source: MLB Standings Grid – 2026
Team	AZ	ATL	CHC	CIN	COL	LAD	MIA	MIL	NYM	PHI	PIT	SD	SF	STL	WSH	AL
Arizona	—	4–3	2–4	4–2	9–4	7–6	1–5	2–4	4–2	3–3	3–3	6–7	10–3	5–2	2–4	24–24
Atlanta	3–4	—	3–3	3–3	6–0	5–1	9–4	3–3	6–7	9–4	5–1	3–4	1–5	2–4	9–4	27–21
Chicago	4–2	3–3	—	9–4	3–3	4–2	3–3	4–9	7–0	6–1	7–6	5–1	3–3	6–7	3–3	22–26
Cincinnati	2–4	3–3	4–9	—	4–2	1–6	3–4	4–9	4–2	3–3	6–7	3–3	3–3	5–8	1–5	29–19
Colorado	4–9	0–6	3–3	2–4	—	3–10	2–5	1–5	4–2	2–4	3–3	2–11	7–6	2–4	3–4	20–28
Los Angeles	6–7	1–5	2–4	6–1	10–3	—	2–4	3–4	5–1	4–2	5–1	8–5	9–4	2–4	6–0	31–17
Miami	5–1	4–9	3–3	4–3	5–2	4–2	—	1–5	6–7	5–8	4–2	0–6	4–2	4–2	9–4	22–26
Milwaukee	4–2	3–3	9–4	9–4	5–1	4–3	5–1	—	4–2	4–2	6–7	2–4	3–4	11–2	2–4	32–16
New York	2–4	7–6	0–7	2–4	2–4	1–5	7–6	2–4	—	6–7	4–2	4–2	5–2	2–4	7–6	23–25
Philadelphia	3–3	4–9	1–6	3–3	4–2	2–4	8–5	2–4	7–6	—	5–2	6–0	4–2	4–2	9–4	26–22
Pittsburgh	3–3	1–5	6–7	7–6	3–3	1–5	2–4	7–6	2–4	2–5	—	3–3	3–3	6–7	4–3	32–16
San Diego	7–6	4–3	1–5	3–3	11–2	5–8	6–0	4–2	2–4	0–6	3–3	—	9–4	3–4	4–2	29–19
San Francisco	3–10	5–1	3–3	3–3	6–7	4–9	2–4	4–3	2–5	2–4	3–3	4–9	—	5–1	3–3	16–32
St. Louis	2–5	4–2	7–6	8–5	4–2	4–2	2–4	2–11	4–2	2–4	7–6	4–3	1–5	—	3–3	23–25
Washington	4–2	4–9	3–3	5–1	4–3	0–6	4–9	4–2	6–7	4–9	3–4	2–4	3–3	3–3	—	28–20

Updated with the results of all games through September 27, 2026.

== Game log ==
=== Regular season ===
Legend
	Diamondbacks win
	Diamondbacks loss
	Postponement
	Eliminated from playoff race
**Bold**	Diamondbacks team member

2026 Game Log: 86–76 (Home: 45–36; Road: 41–40)
March/April: 16–14 (Home: 9–6; Road: 7–8)

#	Date	Opponent	Score	Win	Loss	Save	Attendance	Record	Streak
1	March 26	@ Dodgers	2–8	Yamamoto (1–0)	**Gallen** (0–1)	—	53,712	0–1	L1
2	March 27	@ Dodgers	4–5	Henriquez (1–0)	**Ginkel** (0–1)	Díaz (1)	51,540	0–2	L2
3	March 28	@ Dodgers	2–3	Klein (1–0)	**Morillo** (0–1)	Díaz (2)	53,340	0–3	L3
4	March 30	Tigers	9–6	**Soroka** (1–0)	Verlander (0–1)	**Sewald** (1)	48,350	1–3	W1
5	March 31	Tigers	7–5	**Hoffmann** (1–0)	Vest (0–1)	**Sewald** (2)	28,780	2–3	W2
6	April 1	Tigers	1–0	**Gallen** (1–1)	Skubal (1–1)	**Loáisiga** (1)	23,166	3–3	W3
7	April 2	Braves	2–17	López (1–0)	**Nelson** (0–1)	Bido (1)	21,600	3–4	L1
8	April 3	Braves	0–2	Suárez (1–0)	**Sewald** (0–1)	Iglesias (1)	29,192	3–5	L2
9	April 4	Braves	2–1	**Soroka** (2–0)	Elder (1–1)	**Sewald** (3)	37,457	4–5	W1
10	April 5	Braves	6–5 (10)	**Rashi** (1–0)	Payamps (0–1)	—	25,814	5–5	W2
11	April 7	@ Mets	3–4 (10)	Weaver (1–0)	**Sewald** (0–2)	—	34,753	5–6	L1
12	April 8	@ Mets	7–2	**Nelson** (1–1)	Peterson (0–2)	—	33,422	6–6	W1
13	April 9	@ Mets	7–1	**Rodríguez** (1–0)	McLean (1–1)	—	35,783	7–6	W2
14	April 10	@ Phillies	5–4	**Soroka** (3–0)	Luzardo (1–2)	**Sewald** (4)	41,683	8–6	W3
15	April 11	@ Phillies	3–4	Walker (1–2)	**Pfaadt** (0–1)	Durán (5)	41,201	8–7	L1
16	April 12	@ Phillies	4–3	**Clarke** (1–0)	Alvarado (0–1)	**Sewald** (5)	43,060	9–7	W1
17	April 13	@ Orioles	7–9	Suárez (1–0)	**Loáisiga** (0–1)	Helsley (5)	10,289	9–8	L1
18	April 14	@ Orioles	4–3	**Kelly** (1–0)	Rogers (2–1)	**Sewald** (6)	13,524	10–8	W1
19	April 15	@ Orioles	8–5 (10)	**Thompson** (1–0)	Wells (0–1)	**Morillo** (1)	17,028	11–8	W2
20	April 17	Blue Jays	6–3	**Soroka** (4–0)	Lauer (1–3)	**Sewald** (7)	32,747	12–8	W3
21	April 18	Blue Jays	6–2	**Morillo** (1–1)	Hoffman (1–2)	—	36,946	13–8	W4
22	April 19	Blue Jays	4–10	Gausman (1–1)	**Nelson** (1–2)	—	32,240	13–9	L1
23	April 21	White Sox	5–11	Burke (1–2)	**Kelly** (1–1)	—	23,045	13–10	L2
24	April 22	White Sox	11–7	**Rodríguez** (2–0)	Kay (1–1)	—	20,799	14–10	W1
25	April 23	White Sox	1–4	Taylor (1–0)	**Sewald** (0–3)	Domínguez (5)	20,405	14–11	L1
26	April 25	Padres*	4–6	Márquez (3–1)	**Clarke** (1–1)	Miller (10)	19,630	14–12	L2
27	April 26	Padres*	12–7	**Thompson** (2–0)	Rodríguez (0–2)	—	19,671	15–12	W1
28	April 28	@ Brewers	2–13	Patrick (2–1)	**Kelly** (1–2)	Woodford (1)	23,062	15–13	L1
29	April 29	@ Brewers	6–2	**Ginkel** (1–1)	Sproat (0–2)	—	24,540	16–13	W1
30	April 30	@ Brewers	1–13	Drohan (1–1)	**Soroka** (4–1)	—	26,849	16–14	L1
*April 25 and 26 games played at Estadio Alfredo Harp Helú in Mexico City, Mexico

May: 15–13 (Home: 9–4; Road: 6–9)

#	Date	Opponent	Score	Win	Loss	Save	Attendance	Record	Streak
31	May 1	@ Cubs	5–6	Rea (4–1)	**Gallen** (1–2)	Webb (1)	31,083	16–15	L2
32	May 2	@ Cubs	0–2	Imanaga (3–2)	**Nelson** (1–3)	Brown (1)	36,907	16–16	L3
33	May 3	@ Cubs	4–8	Boyd (2–1)	**Kelly** (1–3)	—	35,597	16–17	L4
34	May 5	Pirates	9–0	**Rodríguez** (3–0)	Chandler (1–4)	—	22,410	17–17	W1
35	May 6	Pirates	0–1	Skenes (5–2)	**Soroka** (4–2)	Soto (2)	21,719	17–18	L1
36	May 7	Pirates	2–4	Keller (4–1)	**Gallen** (1–3)	Soto (3)	21,827	17–19	L2
37	May 8	Mets	1–3 (10)	Williams (2–1)	**Ginkel** (1–2)	Myers (1)	30,599	17–20	L3
38	May 9	Mets	2–1	**Kelly** (2–3)	Holmes (4–3)	**Sewald** (8)	38,726	18–20	W1
39	May 10	Mets	5–1	**Rodríguez** (4–0)	Brazobán (2–1)	—	40,170	19–20	W2
40	May 11	@ Rangers	1–0	**Soroka** (5–2)	Junis (0–1)	**Sewald** (9)	22,651	20–20	W3
41	May 12	@ Rangers	4–7	Gore (3–3)	**Gallen** (1–4)	Latz (5)	23,160	20–21	L1
42	May 13	@ Rangers	5–6	Quantrill (2–0)	**Sewald** (0–4)	—	26,049	20–22	L2
43	May 15	@ Rockies	9–1	**Kelly** (3–3)	Freeland (1–5)	—	27,557	21–22	W1
44	May 16	@ Rockies	2–4	Sugano (4–3)	**Rodríguez** (4–1)	Senzatela (3)	34,405	21–23	L1
45	May 17	@ Rockies	8–6	**Soroka** (6–2)	Lorenzen (2–6)	**Sewald** (10)	24,955	22–23	W1
46	May 18	Giants	12–2	**Gallen** (2–4)	Ray (3–6)	—	20,072	23–23	W2
47	May 19	Giants	5–3	**Loáisiga** (1–1)	Kilian (1–2)	—	19,548	24–23	W3
48	May 20	Giants	6–3	**Kelly** (4–3)	Mahle (1–6)	**Sewald** (11)	17,748	25–23	W4
49	May 21	Rockies	2–1	**Sewald** (1–4)	Mejía (0–4)	—	14,761	26–23	W5
50	May 22	Rockies	2–3	Senzatela (4–0)	**Thompson** (2–1)	—	29,945	26–24	L1
51	May 23	Rockies	5–4	**Gallen** (3–4)	Lorenzen (2–7)	**Sewald** (12)	33,891	27–24	W1
52	May 24	Rockies	9–1	**Nelson** (2–3)	Quintana (2–3)	—	30,037	28–24	W2
53	May 25	@ Giants	6–2	**Kelly** (5–3)	Roupp (5–5)	—	38,380	29–24	W3
54	May 26	@ Giants	7–5	**Rodríguez** (5–1)	Mahle (1–7)	**Sewald** (13)	32,336	30–24	W4
55	May 27	@ Giants	3–2	**Soroka** (7–2)	McDonald (2–2)	**Sewald** (14)	33,258	31–24	W5
56	May 29	@ Mariners	6–7 (10)	Criswell (2–1)	**Morillo** (1–2)	—	44,198	31–25	L1
57	May 30	@ Mariners	1–5	Woo (5–3)	**Nelson** (2–4)	—	44,364	31–26	L2
58	May 31	@ Mariners	2–3 (10)	Castillo (2–5)	**Loáisiga** (1–2)	—	41,897	31–27	L3

June: 12–15 (Home: 8–7; Road: 4–8)

#	Date	Opponent	Score	Win	Loss	Save	Attendance	Record	Streak
59	June 1	Dodgers	4–1	**Clarke** (2–1)	Sheehan (3–2)	**Sewald** (15)	31,410	32–27	W1
60	June 2	Dodgers	5–6	Treinen (2–1)	**Soroka** (7–3)	Scott (6)	32,829	32–28	L1
61	June 3	Dodgers	0–7	Ohtani (6–2)	**Gallen** (3–5)	—	36,213	32–29	L2
62	June 4	Dodgers	3–2	**Sewald** (2–4)	Scott (1–3)	—	41,999	33–29	W1
63	June 5	Nationals	1–14	Griffin (7–2)	**Kelly** (5–4)	—	24,272	33–30	L1
64	June 6	Nationals	1–6	Littell (6–4)	**Rodríguez** (5–2)	Lord (1)	30,638	33–31	L2
65	June 7	Nationals	5–1	**Soroka** (8–3)	Cavalli (3–4)	—	35,540	34–31	W1
66	June 9	@ Marlins	6–10	Fairbanks (3–3)	**Garcia** (0–1)	—	8,372	34–32	L1
67	June 10	@ Marlins	0–8	Kempner (1–0)	**Nelson** (2–5)	—	7,729	34–33	L2
68	June 11	@ Marlins	0–2	Phillips (1–1)	**Kelly** (5–5)	Fairbanks (8)	8,580	34–34	L3
69	June 12	@ Reds	5–2	**Ginkel** (2–2)	Burke (2–3)	**Sewald** (16)	29,803	35–34	W1
70	June 13	@ Reds	1–2	Petty (1–1)	**Morillo** (1–3)	Santillan (3)	27,563	35–35	L1
71	June 14	@ Reds	5–3	**Morillo** (2–3)	Maxwell (0–1)	**Sewald** (17)	22,946	36–35	W1
72	June 15	Angels	4–3	**Nelson** (3–5)	Ureña (4–5)	**Sewald** (18)	29,457	37–35	W2
73	June 16	Angels	0–7	Detmers (3–5)	**Kelly** (5–6)	—	36,905	37–36	L1
74	June 17	Angels	8–1	**Rodríguez** (6–2)	Aldegheri (2–2)	—	28,433	38–36	W1
75	June 19	Twins	9–5	**Loáisiga** (2–2)	Prielipp (2–5)	—	25,110	39–36	W2
76	June 20	Twins	8–16	Bradley (6–3)	**Gallen** (3–6)	—	30,575	39–37	L1
77	June 21	Twins	2–4	Laweryson (1–0)	**Morillo** (2–4)	Banda (2)	34,024	39–38	L2
78	June 22	@ Cardinals	2–3	Pallante (9–4)	**Kelly** (5–7)	O'Brien (19)	22,050	39–39	L3
79	June 23	@ Cardinals	4–3	**Ginkel** (3–2)	Svanson (2–2)	**Garcia** (1)	23,560	40–39	W1
80	June 24	@ Cardinals	9–4	**Thompson** (3–1)	Liberatore (3–5)	—	22,376	41–39	W2
―	June 25	@ Cardinals	**Postponed (rain)** (Makeup date: July 23)						
81	June 26	@ Rays	1–6	Martinez (7–2)	**Gallen** (3–7)	—	12,972	41–40	L1
82	June 27	@ Rays	2–4	Grove (1–0)	**Cabrera** (0–1)	Baker (21)	17,562	41–41	L2
83	June 28	@ Rays	1–5	Rasmussen (7–4)	**Kelly** (5–8)	—	17,195	41–42	L3
84	June 29	Giants	5–4	**Rodríguez** (7–2)	Mahle (1–8)	**Sewald** (19)	18,838	42–42	W1
85	June 30	Giants	8–2	**Pfaadt** (1–1)	Roupp (5–8)	—	20,420	43–42	W2

July: 15–10 (Home: 5–5; Road: 10–5)

#	Date	Opponent	Score	Win	Loss	Save	Attendance	Record	Streak
86	July 1	Giants	4–6	McDonald (3–6)	**Gallen** (3–8)	Kilian (7)	17,142	43–43	L1
87	July 3	Brewers	4–7 (11)	Anderson (2–3)	**Thompson** (3–2)	—	31,280	43–44	L2
88	July 4	Brewers	4–3	**Kelly** (6–8)	Woodruff (2–2)	**Sewald** (20)	33,154	44–44	W1
89	July 5	Brewers	2–3	Rom (1–0)	**Rodríguez** (7–3)	Megill (13)	24,728	44–45	L1
90	July 6	@ Padres	8–0	**Pfaadt** (2–1)	Buehler (5–5)	—	38,204	45–45	W1
91	July 7	@ Padres	1–4	Márquez (4–2)	**Gallen** (3–9)	Miller (23)	40,223	45–46	L1
92	July 8	@ Padres	4–10	King (6–7)	**Cabrera** (0–2)	—	39,423	45–47	L2
93	July 9	@ Padres	3–1	**Kelly** (7–8)	Canning (1–7)	**Sewald** (21)	39,270	46–47	W1
94	July 10	@ Dodgers	9–3	**Rodríguez** (8–3)	Klein (3–4)	—	47,727	47–47	W2
95	July 11	@ Dodgers	9–2	**Pfaadt** (3–1)	Yamamoto (9–6)	—	48,102	48–47	W3
96	July 12	@ Dodgers	5–3	**Thompson** (4–2)	Henriquez (4–1)	**Sewald** (22)	47,967	49–47	W4
–	July 14	**96th All-Star Game in Philadelphia, PA**							
97	July 17	Cardinals	4–5	Gastélum (1–0)	**Sewald** (2–5)	O'Brien (25)	29,931	49–48	L1
98	July 18	Cardinals	5–3	**Pfaadt** (4–1)	May (5–7)	**Sewald** (23)	38,244	50–48	W1
99	July 19	Cardinals	8–7 (10)	**Morillo** (3–4)	Gastélum (1–1)	—	28,069	51–48	W2
100	July 20	Athletics	2–5	Medina (2–1)	**Ginkel** (3–3)	Harris (7)	19,121	51–49	L1
101	July 21	Athletics	6–5 (10)	**Ginkel** (4–3)	Medina (2–2)	—	19,709	52–49	W1
102	July 22	Athletics	15–5	**Kelly** (8–8)	Jump (3–6)	—	19,343	53–49	W2
103	July 23	@ Cardinals	10–6	**Pfaadt** (5–1)	McGreevy (4–8)	—	32,381	54–49	W3
104	July 24	@ Nationals	3–2	**Rodríguez** (9–3)	Littell (7–8)	**Sewald** (24)	36,065	55–49	W4
105	July 25	@ Nationals	3–5	Griffin (12–2)	**Bratt** (0–1)	Beeter (9)	30,032	55–50	L1
106	July 26	@ Nationals	7–10	Cornelio (2–1)	**Loáisiga** (2–3)	Beeter (10)	21,341	55–51	L2
107	July 27	@ Pirates	2–3 (10)	Montgomery (4–3)	**Clarke** (2–2)	—	15,412	55–52	L3
108	July 28	@ Pirates	8–7 (12)	**Carrillo** (1–0)	Dotel (1–3)	—	19,024	56–52	W1
109	July 29	@ Pirates	3–0	**Rodríguez** (10–3)	Jones (2–2)	**Garcia** (2)	19,716	57–52	W2
110	July 31	@ Guardians	4–1	**Loáisiga** (3–3)	Bibee (4–11)	**Garcia** (3)	36,639	58–52	W3

August: 15–14 (Home: 9–8; Road: 6–6)

#	Date	Opponent	Score	Win	Loss	Save	Attendance	Record	Streak
111	August 1	@ Guardians	12–8	**Carrillo** (2–0)	Gaddis (1–3)	—	30,392	59–52	W4
112	August 2	@ Guardians	0–5	Williams (11–6)	**Kelly** (8–9)	—	24,869	59–53	L1
113	August 3	Padres	5–1	**Pfaadt** (6–1)	King (6–8)	—	22,008	60–53	W1
114	August 4	Padres	4–9	Vásquez (7–6)	**Rodríguez** (10–4)	—	20,839	60–54	L1
115	August 5	Padres	10–4	**Bratt** (1–1)	Mize (4–7)	—	17,559	61–54	W1
116	August 6	Padres	1–5	Rodríguez (3–2)	**Drake** (0–1)	—	21,884	61–55	L1
117	August 7	Dodgers	4–3	**Ginkel** (5–3)	Díaz (1–1)	—	46,172	62–55	W1
118	August 8	Dodgers	1–2 (10)	Díaz (2–1)	**Carrillo** (2–1)	Dreyer (1)	46,213	62–56	L1
119	August 9	Dodgers	4–2	**Rodríguez** (11–4)	Wrobleski (11–4)	**Ginkel** (1)	43,775	63–56	W1
120	August 10	Rockies	9–0	**Littell** (8–8)	Hughes (0–4)	—	17,358	64–56	W2
121	August 11	Rockies	2–3	Sugano (12–5)	**Ginkel** (5–4)	Romano (11)	21,002	64–57	L1
122	August 12	Rockies	4–6	Feltner (5–6)	**Kelly** (8–10)	Romano (12)	17,168	64–58	L2
123	August 14	@ Braves	2–0	**Pfaadt** (7–1)	Sale (12–8)	**Garcia** (4)	35,106	65–58	W1
124	August 15	@ Braves	10–3	**Rodríguez** (12–4)	Holmes (7–5)	—	39,693	66–58	W2
125	August 16	@ Braves	3–5	Fuentes (5–1)	**Clarke** (2–3)	Iglesias (25)	29,629	66–59	L1
126	August 17	@ Red Sox	1–11	Bello (5–6)	**Bratt** (1–2)	—	36,511	66–60	L2
127	August 18	@ Red Sox	4–9	Suárez (5–3)	**Kelly** (8–11)	—	36,592	66–61	L3
128	August 19	@ Red Sox	7–6 (10)	**Loáisiga** (4–3)	Morán (2–3)	—	36,540	67–61	W1
129	August 21	Reds	9–0	**Rodríguez** (13–4)	Lodolo (3–3)	—	32,087	68–61	W2
130	August 22	Reds	5–11	Lowder (5–8)	**Soroka** (8–4)	—	36,405	68–62	L1
131	August 23	Reds	5–3	**Loáisiga** (5–3)	Abbott (6–9)	**Ginkel** (2)	28,433	69–62	W1
132	August 24	Cubs	0–7	Gausman (7–11)	**Kelly** (8–12)	—	28,704	69–63	L1
133	August 25	Cubs	5–4	**Martínez** (1–0)	Webb (6–4)	—	28,215	70–63	W1
134	August 26	Cubs	2–0	**Rodríguez** (14–4)	Boyd (8–3)	**Morillo** (2)	24,297	71–63	W2
135	August 27	@ Giants	1–6	Roupp (8–13)	**Cabrera** (0–3)	—	40,120	71–64	L1
136	August 28	@ Giants	10–6	**Carrillo** (3–1)	Tidwell (0–1)	—	27,153	72–64	W1
137	August 29 (1) (Note: The August 30 game was moved forward a day as a doubleheader to accommodate for the rescheduling of the postponned game between the Giants and the Braves on June 18.)	@ Giants	7–1	**Kelly** (9–12)	Wilkinson (0–2)	—	39,190	73–64	W2
138	August 29 (2)	@ Giants	2–7	Sanmartín (2–0)	**Bratt** (1–3)	—	29,272	73–65	L1
139	August 31	Phillies	1–2	Nola (6–10)	**Pfaadt** (7–2)	Durán (29)	21,314	73–66	L2

September: 13–10 (Home: 5–6; Road: 8–4)

#	Date	Opponent	Score	Win	Loss	Save	Attendance	Record	Streak
140	September 1	Phillies	1–7	Luzardo (13–5)	**Rodríguez** (14–5)	—	27,395	73–67	L3
141	September 2	Phillies	1–0	**Loáisiga** (6–3)	Bowlan (2–2)	**Morillo** (3)	19,039	74–67	W1
142	September 4	@ Astros	1–3	Javier (2–5)	**Kelly** (9–13)	Hader (23)	33,482	74–68	L1
143	September 5	@ Astros	4–3 (10)	**Loáisiga** (7–3)	King (2–4)	**Garcia** (5)	36,470	75–68	W1
144	September 6	@ Astros	3–2	**Rodríguez** (15–5)	Lambert (8–8)	**Ginkel** (3)	39,478	76–68	W2
145	September 7	@ Royals	5–4 (10)	**Martínez** (2–0)	Kimbrel (1–4)	**Santana** (3)	18,912	77–68	W3
146	September 8	@ Royals	5–3 (11)	**Walston** (1–0)	Gose (1–1)	—	13,361	78–68	W4
147	September 9	@ Royals	2–5	Lynch IV (5–5)	**Soroka** (8–5)	Pearson (4)	15,369	78–69	L1
148	September 11	Rangers	9–1	**Ginkel** (6–4)	Gore (8–11)	—	32,849	79–69	W1
149	September 12	Rangers	2–6	Garcia (1–1)	**Pfaadt** (7–3)	—	34,300	79–70	L1
150	September 13	Rangers	6–7	Quantrill (9–5)	**Rodríguez** (15–6)	Latz (29)	28,843	79–71	L2
151	September 14	Marlins	8–7	**Morillo** (4–4)	Ralston (0–1)	—	19,434	80–71	W1
152	September 15	Marlins	2–4 (11)	Ekness (2–3)	**Clarke** (2–3)	—	24,869	80–72	L1
153	September 16	Marlins	3–4	Gibson (5–1)	**Kelly** (9–14)	Alcántara (1)	22,162	80–73	L2
154	September 18	Yankees	2–9	Cole (9–9)	**Rodríguez** (15–7)	—	41,910	80–74	L3
155	September 19	Yankees	5–3	**Morillo** (5–4)	Fulmer (0–1)	—	47,918	81–74	W1
156	September 20	Yankees	8–4	**Martínez** (3–0)	Headrick (7–4)	—	37,755	82–74	W2
157	September 22	@ Rockies	7–2	**Soroka** (9–5)	Freeland (4–11)	—	19,324	83–74	W3
158	September 23	@ Rockies	5–3	**Kelly** (10–14)	Adams (0–2)	**Loáisiga** (2)	21,041	84–74	W4
159	September 24	@ Rockies	12–8	**Rodríguez** (15–7)	Gordon (1–6)	—	22,511	85–74	W5
160	September 25	@ Padres	11–4	**Pfaadt** (8–3)	Mize (6–10)	—	44,512	86–74	W6
161	September 26	@ Padres	7–10	Matsui (5–1)	**Cabrera** (0–4)	—	44,698	86–75	L1
162	September 27	@ Padres	4–9	Canning (5–9)	**Martínez** (3–1)	—	44,471	86–76	L2

== Roster ==
2026 Arizona Diamondbacks
Roster
Pitchers: 50 Philip Abner; 60 Mitch Bratt; 52 Juan Burgos; 39 Corbin Burnes; 53 José Cabrera; 68 Gerardo Carrillo; 45 Taylor Clarke; 30 Yilber Díaz; 58 Kohl Drake; 23 Zac Gallen; 55 Brandyn Garcia; 37 Kevin Ginkel; 56 Andrew Hoffmann; 99 Drey Jameson; 29 Merrill Kelly; 38 Derek Law; 46 Zack Littell; 43 Jonathan Loaisiga; 63 Justin Martínez; 62 Juan Morillo; 19 Ryne Nelson; 32 Brandon Pfaadt; 54 Taylor Rashi; 57 Eduardo Rodriguez; 22 Joe Ross; 59 Dennis Santana; 38 Paul Sewald; 34 Michael Soroka; 24 Kade Strowd; 81 Ryan Thompson; 48 Blake Walston	Catchers: 25 Adrian Del Castillo; 35 Aramis Garcia; 8 James McCann; 14 Gabriel Moreno; Infielders: 28 Nolan Arenado; 21 Luken Baker; 11 José Fernández; 16 LuJames Groover; 31 Tyler Locklear; 4 Ketel Marte; 2 Geraldo Perdomo; 41 Carlos Santana; 26 Pavin Smith; 13 Tim Tawa; 6 Ildemaro Vargas	Outfielders: 1 Jorge Barrosa; 7 Corbin Carroll; 12 Lourdes Gurriel Jr.; 22 Max Kepler; 21 Lars Nootbaar; 10 Jordan Lawlar; 5 Alek Thomas; 9 Tommy Troy; 15 Ryan Waldschmidt; Other batters: 18 Jesús Sánchez	Manager: 17 Torey Lovullo; Coaches: 82 Jeff Banister (bench); 76 Wellington Cepeda (bullpen); 73 Travis Denker (assistant hitting); 72 Owen Dew (assistant pitching); 75 Damion Easley (assistant hitting); 71 J. R. House (third base); 77 Brian Kaplan (pitching); 88 Shaun Larkin (infield); 74 Joe Mather (hitting); 36 Dave McKay (first base); 83 Jose Queliz (bullpen catcher); 84 Jhonatan Solano (bullpen catcher)

=== Season summary ===
Opening Day starting lineup
Order	No.	Player	Pos.
Batters
1	4	Ketel Marte	2B
2	7	Corbin Carroll	RF
3	2	Geraldo Perdomo	SS
4	14	Gabriel Moreno	C
5	28	Nolan Arenado	3B
6	41	Carlos Santana	1B
7	10	Jordan Lawlar	LF
8	5	Alek Thomas	CF
9	13	Tim Tawa	DH
Starting pitcher
–	23	Zac Gallen	

==== Uniform combination ====
Team	Home White	Away Gray	Black Alternate	Red Alternate	City Connect	Sources
Arizona Diamondbacks	39	26	48	34	15	

=== MLB debuts ===
Diamondbacks have had eight players make their MLB debuts during the 2026 regular season:

- March 31: José Fernández
- May 8: Ryan Waldschmidt
- May 24: Tommy Troy
- June 5: LuJames Groover
- June 21: José Cabrera
- June 24: Mitch Bratt
- July 22: Kohl Drake
- July 23: Gerardo Carrillo

== Player stats ==
= Indicates team leader

= Indicates league leader

=== Batting ===
Note: G = Games played; AB = At bats; R = Runs scored; H = Hits; 2B = Doubles; 3B = Triples; HR = Home runs; RBI = Runs batted in; SB = Stolen bases; BB = Walks; AVG = Batting average; SLG = Slugging average

Player	G	AB	R	H	2B	3B	HR	RBI	SB	BB	AVG	SLG
Geraldo Perdomo	157	562	75	147	20	9	9	59	21	96	.262	.377
Corbin Carroll	156	582	91	139	33	17	22	78	21	73	.239	.467
Nolan Arenado	152	533	80	136	25	1	30	86	4	52	.255	.475
Ildemaro Vargas	142	453	62	115	19	5	9	67	3	27	.254	.377
Ketel Marte	141	562	78	140	31	3	22	76	4	51	.249	.432
Gabriel Moreno	130	473	72	147	33	1	16	83	6	61	.311	.486
Tim Tawa	104	313	41	75	13	1	11	42	8	27	.240	.393
Jorge Barrosa	97	134	28	27	11	1	2	12	3	14	.201	.343
Ryan Waldschmidt	82	250	30	64	15	2	3	22	8	22	.256	.368
José Fernández	73	204	26	52	9	0	3	16	9	11	.255	.343
Adrian Del Castillo	64	181	18	35	6	0	5	24	1	13	.193	.309
Lourdes Gurriel Jr.	51	186	13	39	9	0	2	22	1	10	.210	.290
James McCann	51	156	17	44	6	0	7	28	0	6	.282	.455
Tommy Troy	45	129	23	28	3	1	4	9	1	13	.217	.349
Jordan Lawlar	44	136	18	32	5	1	6	19	6	5	.259	.448
Lars Nootbaar	42	127	17	31	6	0	5	17	1	22	.258	.460
Max Kepler	41	132	11	27	7	0	2	15	0	11	.205	.303
Pavin Smith	40	109	12	20	3	0	3	12	2	12	.183	.294
Alek Thomas	25	94	12	17	9	0	2	10	4	3	.181	.340
LuJames Groover	15	48	4	8	2	0	1	4	0	5	.167	.271
Tyler Locklear	15	36	8	10	3	0	1	6	1	4	.278	.444
Aramis Garcia	8	19	2	3	0	0	1	2	0	0	.158	.316
Carlos Santana	8	24	1	2	1	0	0	0	0	0	.083	.125
Jesús Sánchez	6	15	0	2	0	0	0	0	0	1	.133	.133
Luken Baker	3	5	0	1	0	0	0	0	0	0	.200	.200
Jonathan Loáisiga	1	0	0	0	0	0	0	0	0	0	.000	.000
Merrill Kelly	1	0	0	0	0	0	0	0	0	0	.000	.000
Brandyn Garcia	1	0	0	0	0	0	0	0	0	0	.000	.000
Taylor Clarke	1	0	0	0	0	0	0	0	0	0	.000	.000
Team totals	162	5451	739	1341	269	42	166	706	103	541	.246	.402

Source:Baseball Reference

=== Pitching ===
Note: W = Wins; L = Losses; ERA = Earned run average; G = Games pitched; GS = Games started; SV = Saves; IP = Innings pitched; H = Hits allowed; R = Runs allowed; ER = Earned runs allowed; BB = Walks allowed; SO = Strikeouts

Player	W	L	ERA	G	GS	SV	IP	H	R	ER	BB	SO
Eduardo Rodríguez	16	7	2.89	32	32	0	189.2	173	68	61	62	143
Merrill Kelly	10	14	4.94	29	29	0	162.0	166	93	89	70	113
Brandon Pfaadt	8	3	3.77	29	19	0	136.0	129	61	57	32	94
Michael Soroka	9	5	3.41	22	21	0	116.0	97	45	44	29	114
Zac Gallen	3	9	6.07	22	20	0	105.1	128	78	71	35	64
Ryne Nelson	3	5	4.95	19	15	0	87.1	86	55	48	24	66
Taylor Clarke	2	4	2.96	71	2	0	73.0	59	28	24	17	45
Kevin Ginkel	6	4	4.12	74	0	3	67.2	59	34	31	17	72
Jonathan Loáisiga	7	3	2.42	67	0	2	67.0	56	20	18	13	48
Juan Morillo	5	4	2.24	70	0	3	64.1	45	18	16	23	74
Brandyn Garcia	0	1	1.93	57	0	5	51.1	27	12	11	11	60
Mitch Bratt	1	3	4.70	10	10	0	44.0	40	23	23	27	30
Ryan Thompson	4	2	4.43	46	0	0	40.2	51	23	20	13	29
Paul Sewald	2	5	6.23	45	0	24	39.0	34	29	27	9	44
José Cabrera	0	3	5.73	8	5	0	28.1	32	18	18	11	20
Kohl Drake	0	1	6.53	5	5	0	20.2	24	15	15	7	17
Drey Jameson	0	0	5.12	12	0	0	19.1	19	11	11	10	13
Gerardo Carrillo	3	1	4.15	13	0	0	17.1	14	10	8	16	21
Dennis Santana	0	0	4.20	13	0	1	15.0	14	8	7	4	12
Philip Abner	0	0	6.28	8	0	0	14.1	14	10	10	8	6
Justin Martínez	3	1	2.03	15	0	0	13.1	5	5	3	10	18
Zack Littell	1	0	7.50	3	0	0	12.0	21	12	10	4	3
Andrew Hoffmann	1	0	7.71	8	0	0	11.2	16	12	10	8	12
Corbin Burnes	0	0	7.84	3	3	0	10.0	12	9	9	4	8
Derek Law	0	0	1.00	7	1	0	9.0	8	1	1	2	5
Juan Burgos	0	0	2.08	4	0	0	4.1	3	1	1	0	0
James McCann	0	0	11.25	4	0	0	4.0	9	6	5	3	0
Taylor Rashi	1	0	9.82	3	0	0	3.2	3	4	4	1	4
Joe Ross	0	0	19.64	3	0	0	3.2	7	8	8	4	2
Ildemaro Vargas	0	0	4.91	3	0	0	3.2	3	2	2	3	0
Blake Walston	1	0	3.00	2	0	0	3.0	1	2	1	3	2
Kade Strowd	0	0	3.38	2	0	0	2.2	2	1	1	5	1
Adrian Del Castillo	0	0	5.40	1	0	0	1.2	4	1	1	0	0
Yilber Díaz	0	0	94.50	1	0	0	0.2	7	7	7	1	0
Team totals	86	76	4.18	162	162	38	1442.0	1368	730	669	483	1140

Source:Baseball Reference

== Minor league affiliations ==
Level	Team	League	Location	Manager	W	L	Position
Triple-A	Reno Aces	Pacific Coast League	Reno, Nevada	Jeff Gardner	67	82	5th place
Double-A	Amarillo Sod Poodles	Texas League	Amarillo, Texas	Javier Colina	77	60	1st place Texas League Champions
High-A	Hillsboro Hops	Northwest League	Hillsboro, Oregon	Mark Reed	63	69	5th place
Low-A	Visalia Rawhide	California League	Visalia, California	Dee Garner	54	78	8th place
Rookie	ACL D-backs	Arizona Complex League	Scottsdale, Arizona	Juan Francia	31	28	9th place
Rookie	DSL Arizona Red	Dominican Summer League	Boca Chica, Santo Domingo	Vladimir Frias	33	22	T-15th place
Rookie	DSL Arizona Black	Dominican Summer League	Boca Chica, Santo Domingo	Vladimir Frias	30	25	24th place
