= 2027 Arizona Diamondbacks season =

2027 Arizona Diamondbacks
- League: National League
- Division: West
- Ballpark: Chase Field
- City: Phoenix, Arizona
- Owner: Ken Kendrick
- General manager: Mike Hazen
- Manager: Torey Lovullo
- Television: MLB Local Media; Games distributed to local cable providers like YurView Arizona
- Radio: KMVP-FM (98.7)
- Stats: ESPN.com; Baseball Reference

The 2027 Arizona Diamondbacks season is scheduled to be the franchise's 30th season in Major League Baseball and their 30th season at Chase Field in Phoenix, Arizona, as members of the National League West. They are managed by Torey Lovullo in his eleventh season with the franchise.

The season is contingent on Major League Baseball (MLB) and the Major League Baseball Players Association (MLBPA) signing a new collective bargaining agreement (CBA). Without a new CBA, MLB is expected to lock out the players on December 2, 2026, until one is signed. If such a lockout extends indefinitely, the season could be postponed, shortened, or even cancelled.

== Game log ==
The 2027 schedule is tentative until a new collective bargaining agreement (CBA) is signed between Major League Baseball (MLB) and the Major League Baseball Players Association (MLBPA). If the labor dispute extends into late February or early March, MLB would then start to consider whether to postpone or shorten the season.

=== Regular season ===
Legend
	Diamondbacks win
	Diamondbacks loss
	Postponement
**Bold**	Diamondbacks team member

2027 Game Log: 0–0 (Home: 0–0; Road: 0–0)
March/April: 0–0 (Home: 0–0; Road: 0–0)

#	Date	Opponent	Score	Win	Loss	Save	Attendance	Record	Streak
1	March 25	@ Padres	—	—	—	—	—	–	—
2	March 26	@ Padres	—	—	—	—	—	–	—
3	March 27	@ Padres	—	—	—	—	—	–	—
4	March 28	@ Padres	—	—	—	—	—	–	—
5	March 29	@ Giants	—	—	—	—	—	–	—
6	March 30	@ Giants	—	—	—	—	—	–	—
7	March 31	@ Giants	—	—	—	—	—	–	—
8	April 2	Marlins	—	—	—	—	—	–	—
9	April 3	Marlins	—	—	—	—	—	–	—
10	April 4	Marlins	—	—	—	—	—	–	—
11	April 5	Dodgers	—	—	—	—	—	–	—
12	April 6	Dodgers	—	—	—	—	—	–	—
13	April 7	Dodgers	—	—	—	—	—	–	—
14	April 9	@ Yankees	—	—	—	—	—	–	—
15	April 10	@ Yankees	—	—	—	—	—	–	—
16	April 11	@ Yankees	—	—	—	—	—	–	—
17	April 13	@ Marlins	—	—	—	—	—	–	—
18	April 14	@ Marlins	—	—	—	—	—	–	—
19	April 15	@ Marlins	—	—	—	—	—	–	—
20	April 16	Padres	—	—	—	—	—	–	—
21	April 17	Padres	—	—	—	—	—	–	—
22	April 18	Padres	—	—	—	—	—	–	—
23	April 19	Cubs	—	—	—	—	—	–	—
24	April 20	Cubs	—	—	—	—	—	–	—
25	April 21	Cubs	—	—	—	—	—	–	—
26	April 23	@ Phillies	—	—	—	—	—	–	—
27	April 24	@ Phillies	—	—	—	—	—	–	—
28	April 25	@ Phillies	—	—	—	—	—	–	—
29	April 26	@ Phillies	—	—	—	—	—	–	—
30	April 27	@ Tigers	—	—	—	—	—	–	—
31	April 28	@ Tigers	—	—	—	—	—	–	—
32	April 29	@ Tigers	—	—	—	—	—	–	—
33	April 30	Guardians	—	—	—	—	—	–	—

May: 0–0 (Home: 0–0; Road: 0–0)

#	Date	Opponent	Score	Win	Loss	Save	Attendance	Record	Streak
34	May 1	Guardians	—	—	—	—	—	–	—
35	May 2	Guardians	—	—	—	—	—	–	—
36	May 3	Orioles	—	—	—	—	—	–	—
37	May 4	Orioles	—	—	—	—	—	–	—
38	May 5	Orioles	—	—	—	—	—	–	—
39	May 7	Rangers	—	—	—	—	—	–	—
40	May 8	Rangers	—	—	—	—	—	–	—
41	May 9	Rangers	—	—	—	—	—	–	—
42	May 11	@ Reds	—	—	—	—	—	–	—
43	May 12	@ Reds	—	—	—	—	—	–	—
44	May 13	@ Reds	—	—	—	—	—	–	—
45	May 14	@ Braves	—	—	—	—	—	–	—
46	May 15	@ Braves	—	—	—	—	—	–	—
47	May 16	@ Braves	—	—	—	—	—	–	—
48	May 17	Mariners	—	—	—	—	—	–	—
49	May 18	Mariners	—	—	—	—	—	–	—
50	May 19	Mariners	—	—	—	—	—	–	—
51	May 20	Rockies	—	—	—	—	—	–	—
52	May 21	Rockies	—	—	—	—	—	–	—
53	May 22	Rockies	—	—	—	—	—	–	—
54	May 23	Rockies	—	—	—	—	—	–	—
55	May 24	@ Dodgers	—	—	—	—	—	–	—
56	May 25	@ Dodgers	—	—	—	—	—	–	—
57	May 26	@ Dodgers	—	—	—	—	—	–	—
58	May 28	@ Brewers	—	—	—	—	—	–	—
59	May 29	@ Brewers	—	—	—	—	—	–	—
60	May 30	@ Brewers	—	—	—	—	—	–	—
61	May 31	Reds	—	—	—	—	—	–	—

June: 0–0 (Home: 0–0; Road: 0–0)

#	Date	Opponent	Score	Win	Loss	Save	Attendance	Record	Streak
62	June 1	Reds	—	—	—	—	—	–	—
63	June 2	Reds	—	—	—	—	—	–	—
64	June 4	Giants	—	—	—	—	—	–	—
65	June 5	Giants	—	—	—	—	—	–	—
66	June 6	Giants	—	—	—	—	—	–	—
67	June 8	@ Blue Jays	—	—	—	—	—	–	—
68	June 9	@ Blue Jays	—	—	—	—	—	–	—
69	June 10	@ Blue Jays	—	—	—	—	—	–	—
70	June 11	@ Nationals	—	—	—	—	—	–	—
71	June 12	@ Nationals	—	—	—	—	—	–	—
72	June 13	@ Nationals	—	—	—	—	—	–	—
73	June 14	Braves	—	—	—	—	—	–	—
74	June 15	Braves	—	—	—	—	—	–	—
75	June 16	Braves	—	—	—	—	—	–	—
76	June 18	Red Sox	—	—	—	—	—	–	—
77	June 19	Red Sox	—	—	—	—	—	–	—
78	June 20	Red Sox	—	—	—	—	—	–	—
79	June 21	@ Rockies	—	—	—	—	—	–	—
80	June 22	@ Rockies	—	—	—	—	—	–	—
81	June 23	@ Rockies	—	—	—	—	—	–	—
82	June 25	@ Athletics	—	—	—	—	—	–	—
83	June 26	@ Athletics	—	—	—	—	—	–	—
84	June 27	@ Athletics	—	—	—	—	—	–	—
85	June 28	Mets	—	—	—	—	—	–	—
86	June 29	Mets	—	—	—	—	—	–	—
87	June 30	Mets	—	—	—	—	—	–	—

July: 0–0 (Home: 0–0; Road: 0–0)

#	Date	Opponent	Score	Win	Loss	Save	Attendance	Record	Streak
88	July 1	Giants	—	—	—	—	—	–	—
89	July 2	Giants	—	—	—	—	—	–	—
90	July 3	Giants	—	—	—	—	—	–	—
91	July 4	Giants	—	—	—	—	—	–	—
92	July 6	@ Cardinals	—	—	—	—	—	–	—
93	July 7	@ Cardinals	—	—	—	—	—	–	—
94	July 8	@ Cardinals	—	—	—	—	—	–	—
95	July 9	@ White Sox	—	—	—	—	—	–	—
96	July 10	@ White Sox	—	—	—	—	—	–	—
97	July 11	@ White Sox	—	—	—	—	—	–	—
–	July 13	**97th All-Star Game in Chicago, IL**							
98	July 16	Rockies	—	—	—	—	—	–	—
99	July 17	Rockies	—	—	—	—	—	–	—
100	July 18	Rockies	—	—	—	—	—	–	—
101	July 19	Cardinals	—	—	—	—	—	–	—
102	July 20	Cardinals	—	—	—	—	—	–	—
103	July 21	Cardinals	—	—	—	—	—	–	—
104	July 23	@ Pirates	—	—	—	—	—	–	—
105	July 24	@ Pirates	—	—	—	—	—	–	—
106	July 25	@ Pirates	—	—	—	—	—	–	—
107	July 26	@ Mets	—	—	—	—	—	–	—
108	July 27	@ Mets	—	—	—	—	—	–	—
109	July 28	@ Mets	—	—	—	—	—	–	—
110	July 30	@ Rangers	—	—	—	—	—	–	—
111	July 31	@ Rangers	—	—	—	—	—	–	—

August: 0–0 (Home: 0–0; Road: 0–0)

#	Date	Opponent	Score	Win	Loss	Save	Attendance	Record	Streak
112	August 1	@ Rangers	—	—	—	—	—	–	—
113	August 2	Rays	—	—	—	—	—	–	—
114	August 3	Rays	—	—	—	—	—	–	—
115	August 4	Rays	—	—	—	—	—	–	—
116	August 6	Astros	—	—	—	—	—	–	—
117	August 7	Astros	—	—	—	—	—	–	—
118	August 8	Astros	—	—	—	—	—	–	—
119	August 9	@ Padres	—	—	—	—	—	–	—
120	August 10	@ Padres	—	—	—	—	—	–	—
121	August 11	@ Padres	—	—	—	—	—	–	—
122	August 12	Brewers	—	—	—	—	—	–	—
123	August 13	Brewers	—	—	—	—	—	–	—
124	August 14	Brewers	—	—	—	—	—	–	—
125	August 15	Brewers	—	—	—	—	—	–	—
126	August 16	@ Cubs	—	—	—	—	—	–	—
127	August 17	@ Cubs	—	—	—	—	—	–	—
128	August 18	@ Cubs	—	—	—	—	—	–	—
129	August 20	@ Rockies	—	—	—	—	—	–	—
130	August 21	@ Rockies	—	—	—	—	—	–	—
131	August 22	@ Rockies	—	—	—	—	—	–	—
132	August 23	Nationals	—	—	—	—	—	–	—
133	August 24	Nationals	—	—	—	—	—	–	—
134	August 25	Nationals	—	—	—	—	—	–	—
135	August 27	Phillies	—	—	—	—	—	–	—
136	August 28	Phillies	—	—	—	—	—	–	—
137	August 29	Phillies	—	—	—	—	—	–	—
138	August 31	@ Twins	—	—	—	—	—	–	—

September: 0–0 (Home: 0–0; Road: 0–0)

#	Date	Opponent	Score	Win	Loss	Save	Attendance	Record	Streak
139	September 1	@ Twins	—	—	—	—	—	–	—
140	September 2	@ Twins	—	—	—	—	—	–	—
141	September 3	@ Angels	—	—	—	—	—	–	—
142	September 4	@ Angels	—	—	—	—	—	–	—
143	September 5	@ Angels	—	—	—	—	—	–	—
144	September 6	Pirates	—	—	—	—	—	–	—
145	September 7	Pirates	—	—	—	—	—	–	—
146	September 8	Pirates	—	—	—	—	—	–	—
147	September 10	Royals	—	—	—	—	—	–	—
148	September 11	Royals	—	—	—	—	—	–	—
149	September 12	Royals	—	—	—	—	—	–	—
150	September 13	@ Giants	—	—	—	—	—	–	—
151	September 14	@ Giants	—	—	—	—	—	–	—
152	September 15	@ Giants	—	—	—	—	—	–	—
153	September 16	@ Dodgers	—	—	—	—	—	–	—
154	September 17	@ Dodgers	—	—	—	—	—	–	—
155	September 18	@ Dodgers	—	—	—	—	—	–	—
156	September 19	@ Dodgers	—	—	—	—	—	–	—
157	September 21	Padres	—	—	—	—	—	–	—
158	September 22	Padres	—	—	—	—	—	–	—
159	September 23	Padres	—	—	—	—	—	–	—
160	September 24	Dodgers	—	—	—	—	—	–	—
161	September 25	Dodgers	—	—	—	—	—	–	—
162	September 26	Dodgers	—	—	—	—	—	–	—

== Roster ==
Arizona Diamondbacks 2027 spring training roster
40-man roster		Non-roster invitees	Coaches / other
Pitchers: -- Wellington Aracena; 60 Mitch Bratt; 52 Juan Burgos; 39 Corbin Burnes; 53 José Cabrera; 68 Gerardo Carrillo; 58 Kohl Drake; 55 Brandyn Garcia; -- Spencer Giesting; -- Ashton Izzi; 20 Drey Jameson; 29 Merrill Kelly; 63 Justin Martínez; 64 Cristian Mena; 62 Juan Morillo; 19 Ryne Nelson; -- Johan Oviedo; 32 Brandon Pfaadt; 61 Dylan Ray; 57 Eduardo Rodríguez; 24 Kade Strowd	Catchers: 14 Gabriel Moreno; Infielders: 28 Nolan Arenado; -- Demetrio Crisantes; 16 LuJames Groover; 31 Tyler Locklear; 4 Ketel Marte; 2 Geraldo Perdomo; 13 Tim Tawa; -- Cristofer Torin; Outfielders: 7 Corbin Carroll; -- Druw Jones; 10 Jordan Lawlar; 21 Lars Nootbaar; 9 Tommy Troy; 15 Ryan Waldschmidt; Designated hitters: 25 Adrian Del Castillo; 11 José Fernández		Manager: 17 Torey Lovullo; Coaches: 82 Jeff Banister (bench); 76 Wellington Cepeda (bullpen); 73 Travis Denker (assistant hitting); 72 Owen Dew (assistant pitching); 75 Damion Easley (assistant hitting); 71 J. R. House (third base); 88 Shaun Larkin (infield); 74 Joe Mather (hitting); 36 Dave McKay (first base); 83 Jose Queliz (bullpen catcher); 84 Jhonatan Solano (bullpen catcher); Vacant (pitching); 38 active, 0 inactive, 0 non-roster invitees; 7-, 10-, or 15-day injured list; * Not on active roster; ^{†} Suspended list; Roster, coaches, and NRIs updated November 20, 2026; Transactions • Depth chart; → All MLB rosters

== Minor league affiliations ==
Level	Team	League	Location	Manager
Triple-A	Reno Aces	Pacific Coast League	Reno, Nevada	
Double-A	Amarillo Sod Poodles	Texas League	Amarillo, Texas	
High-A	Hillsboro Hops	Northwest League	Hillsboro, Oregon	
Low-A	Visalia Rawhide	California League	Visalia, California	
Rookie	ACL D-backs	Arizona Complex League	Scottsdale, Arizona	
Rookie	DSL D-backs 1	Dominican Summer League	Boca Chica, Santo Domingo	
Rookie	DSL D-backs 2	Dominican Summer League	Boca Chica, Santo Domingo	
