= Alek Thomas =

American baseball player (born 2000)

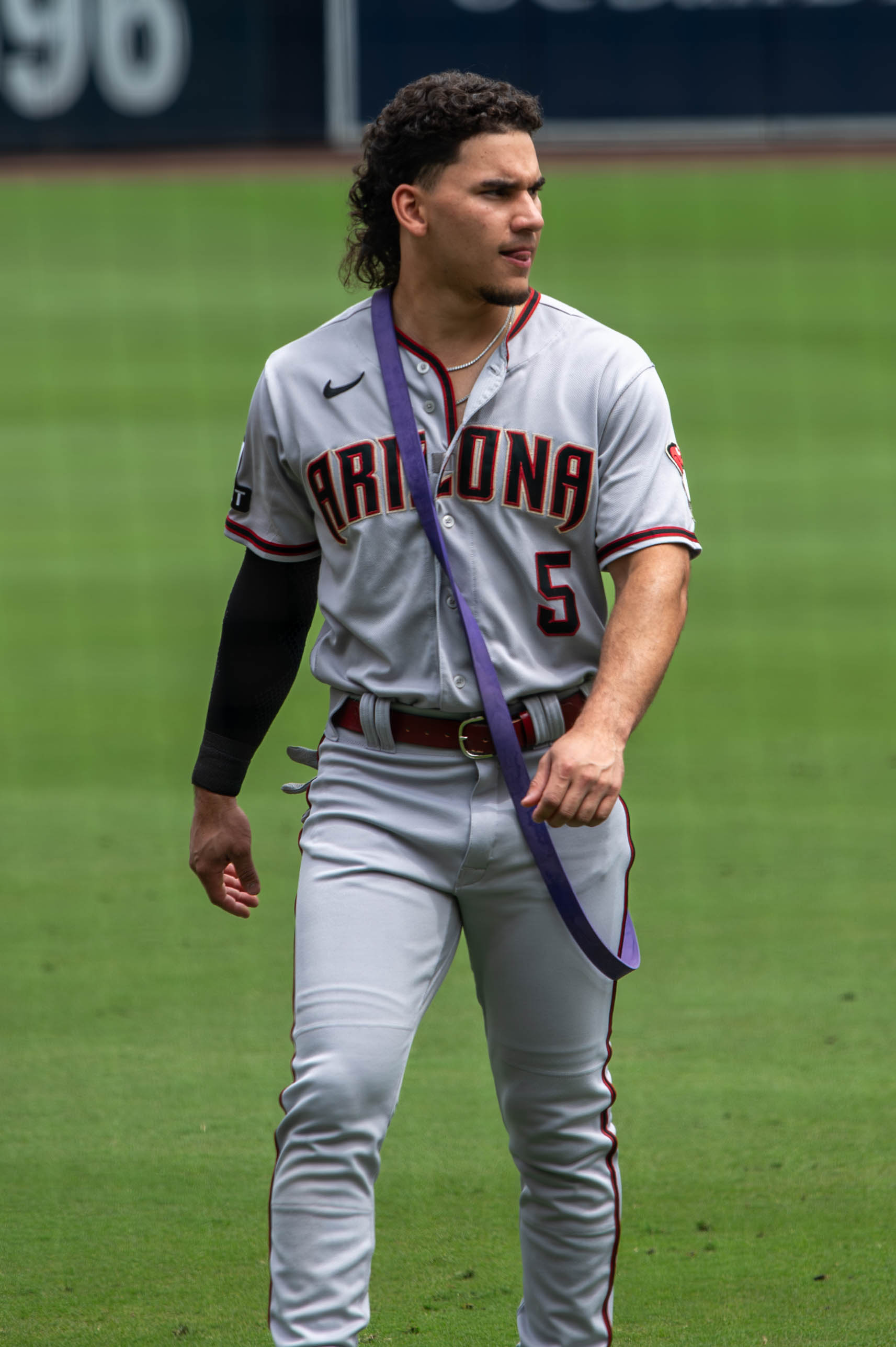
- Thomas playing for the Diamondbacks in 2023

Free agent
- Outfielder
- Born: April 28, 2000 (age 26); Chicago, Illinois, U.S.
- Bats: Left Throws: Left

MLB debut
- May 8, 2022, for the Arizona Diamondbacks

MLB statistics (through 2026 season)
- Batting average: .230
- Home runs: 31
- Runs batted in: 146
- Stats at Baseball Reference

Teams
- Arizona Diamondbacks (2022–2026); Los Angeles Dodgers (2026)
Medals
Men's baseball
Representing United States
U-18 Baseball World Cup
Gold medal – first place	2017 Thunder Bay	Team
Representing Mexico
World Baseball Classic
Bronze medal – third place	2023 Miami	Team

Alek Thomas (born April 28, 2000) is an American professional baseball outfielder who is a free agent. He has previously played in Major League Baseball (MLB) for the Arizona Diamondbacks, with whom made his MLB debut in 2022, and Los Angeles Dodgers. Thomas has also played for the Mexico national baseball team.

== Amateur career ==
Thomas attended Mount Carmel High School in Chicago, Illinois. He committed to play both college baseball and college football at Texas Christian University. During his high school career he hit .423 with 40 home runs and 158 runs batted in (RBI).

== Professional career ==
=== Arizona Diamondbacks ===
The Arizona Diamondbacks selected Thomas in the second round (63rd overall) of the 2018 Major League Baseball draft. He spent his first professional season with the Arizona League Diamondbacks and Missoula Osprey, batting .333 with two home runs, 27 RBI, and 12 stolen bases in 56 games between the two teams. Thomas started 2019 with the Kane County Cougars. In July, he was selected to play in the All-Star Futures Game. In August, Thomas was promoted to the Visalia Rawhide, with whom he finished the year. Over 114 games between the two teams, Thomas slashed .300/.379/.450 with ten home runs, 55 RBI, and 15 stolen bases.

Thomas did not play in a game in 2020 due to the cancellation of the minor league season because of the COVID-19 pandemic. He began the 2021 season with the Double-A Amarillo Sod Poodles. In June, Thomas was selected to play in the All-Star Futures Game. He was promoted to the Reno Aces in August. Over 106 games between the two affiliates, he slashed .313/.394/.559 with 18 home runs, 59 RBI, and 29 doubles. Thomas opened the 2022 season back with Reno, and hitting .277/.362/.495 with four home runs and 14 RBI over 24 games.

On May 8, 2022, Thomas was promoted to the major leagues for the first time. On May 11, he hit his first career home run off Sandy Alcántara of the Miami Marlins. He made 113 appearances for the Diamondbacks during his rookie campaign, batting .231/.275/.344 with eight home runs, 39 RBI, and four stolen bases.

Thomas made 125 appearances for Arizona during the 2023 season, hitting .230/.273/.374 with nine home runs, 39 RBI, and nine stolen bases. In Game 4 of the 2023 National League Championship Series, Thomas hit a pinch-hit, game-tying two-run home run in the eighth inning to help propel the Diamondbacks to a 6–5 victory over the Philadelphia Phillies.

In 2024, Thomas missed extensive time due to a hamstring injury that required a platelet-rich plasma injection. In 39 games for Arizona, he hit .189/.245/.358 with three home runs, 17 RBI, and four stolen bases. Thomas made 143 appearances for the Diamondbacks in 2025, batting .249/.289/.370 with a career-high nine home runs, 38 RBI, and seven stolen bases.

Thomas played in 28 games for Arizona to begin the 2026 campaign, slashing .181/.222/.340 with two home runs, 10 RBI, and four stolen bases. On May 8, 2026, Thomas was designated for assignment by the Diamondbacks following the promotion of Ryan Waldschmidt.

=== Los Angeles Dodgers ===
On May 12, 2026, the Diamondbacks traded Thomas to the Los Angeles Dodgers in exchange for minor league outfielder Jose Requena. He was initially assigned to the Arizona Complex League Dodgers before being promoted to the Triple-A Oklahoma City Comets. Thomas was activated by the Dodgers on August 22, after their starting center fielder Andy Pages was placed on the injured list. In seven appearances, he batted .211/.250/.263 with three RBI before he was designated for assignment on September 5. He returned to Oklahoma City after clearing waivers on September 8, where on the season, he played in 68 games, batting .305 with 11 home runs and 51 RBI. He elected free agency on September 29.

== International career ==
Thomas represented the United States at the 2017 U-18 Baseball World Cup and Mexico at the 2023 World Baseball Classic. Thomas was named to the 2017 U-18 All-World Team after recording a .361 batting average en route to a gold medal. Thomas was selected to play for the Mexico national baseball team at the 2026 World Baseball Classic.

== Personal life ==
Thomas' father Allen was the longtime strength and conditioning coach of the Chicago White Sox. His mother Marcella has roots in Sonora and Thomas has family in Agua Prieta.
