= Donovan Casey =

American baseball player (born 1996)

Free agent
- Outfielder
- Born: February 23, 1996 (age 30); Stratford, New Jersey, U.S.
- Bats: Right Throws: Right

Donovan Casey (born February 23, 1996) is an American professional baseball outfielder who is a free agent.

== Career ==
A native of Stratford, New Jersey, Casey graduated from Sterling High School and played college baseball for Boston College. In 2017, he played collegiate summer baseball with the Chatham Anglers of the Cape Cod Baseball League.

=== Los Angeles Dodgers ===
Casey was selected by the Los Angeles Dodgers in the 20th round of the 2017 MLB draft. He played for the Ogden Raptors and Arizona League Dodgers in 2017 and the Rancho Cucamonga Quakes in 2018.

Casey split the 2019 season between Rancho Cucamonga and the Double–A Tulsa Drillers, accumulating a .260/.322/.479 batting line with 23 home runs, 76 RBI, and 22 stolen bases across 125 games. He did not play in a game in 2020 due to the cancellation of the minor league season because of the COVID-19 pandemic.

=== Washington Nationals ===
On July 30, 2021, he was traded to the Washington Nationals (along with Josiah Gray, Gerardo Carrillo, and Keibert Ruiz) in exchange for Trea Turner and Max Scherzer. He was selected as one of eight Nationals to participate in the Arizona Fall League in 2021, frequently leading off and playing center field for the Surprise Saguaros. On November 19, the Nationals added Casey to their 40-man roster to protect him from the Rule 5 draft.

Casey was called up to the majors for the first time on April 15, 2022, but was optioned back several days later without appearing in an MLB game, becoming a phantom ballplayer. On August 9, Casey was designated for assignment following the waiver claim of Jake McGee. He cleared waivers and was sent outright to the Triple–A Rochester Red Wings on August 11. In 84 games for Rochester, Casey hit .216/.279/.345 with seven home runs, 29 RBI, and six stolen bases.

Casey split the 2023 season between the Single–A Fredericksburg Nationals, High–A Wilmington Blue Rocks, and Double–A Harrisburg Senators. In 73 games between the three affiliates, he batted .191/.278/.245 with two home runs, 20 RBI, and nine stolen bases. Casey elected free agency following the season on November 6, 2023.

=== York Revolution ===
On April 9, 2024, Casey signed with the York Revolution of the Atlantic League of Professional Baseball. In 79 games for York, Casey batted .348/.398/.575 with 16 home runs, 96 RBI, and 33 stolen bases.

=== Los Angeles Dodgers (second stint) ===
On August 6, 2024, Casey's contract was purchased by the Dodgers organization. He was assigned to the Double-A Tulsa Drillers, where he hit .161 in 30 games and did not hit a home run. Casey elected free agency following the season on November 4.

=== Sultanes de Monterrey ===
On April 15, 2025, Casey signed with the Sultanes de Monterrey of the Mexican League. He made 81 appearances for the Sultanes, batting .282/.333/.412 with five home runs, 22 RBI, and 19 stolen bases. Casey was released by Monterrey on February 27, 2026.
