= Keibert Ruiz =

Venezuelan baseball player (born 1998)

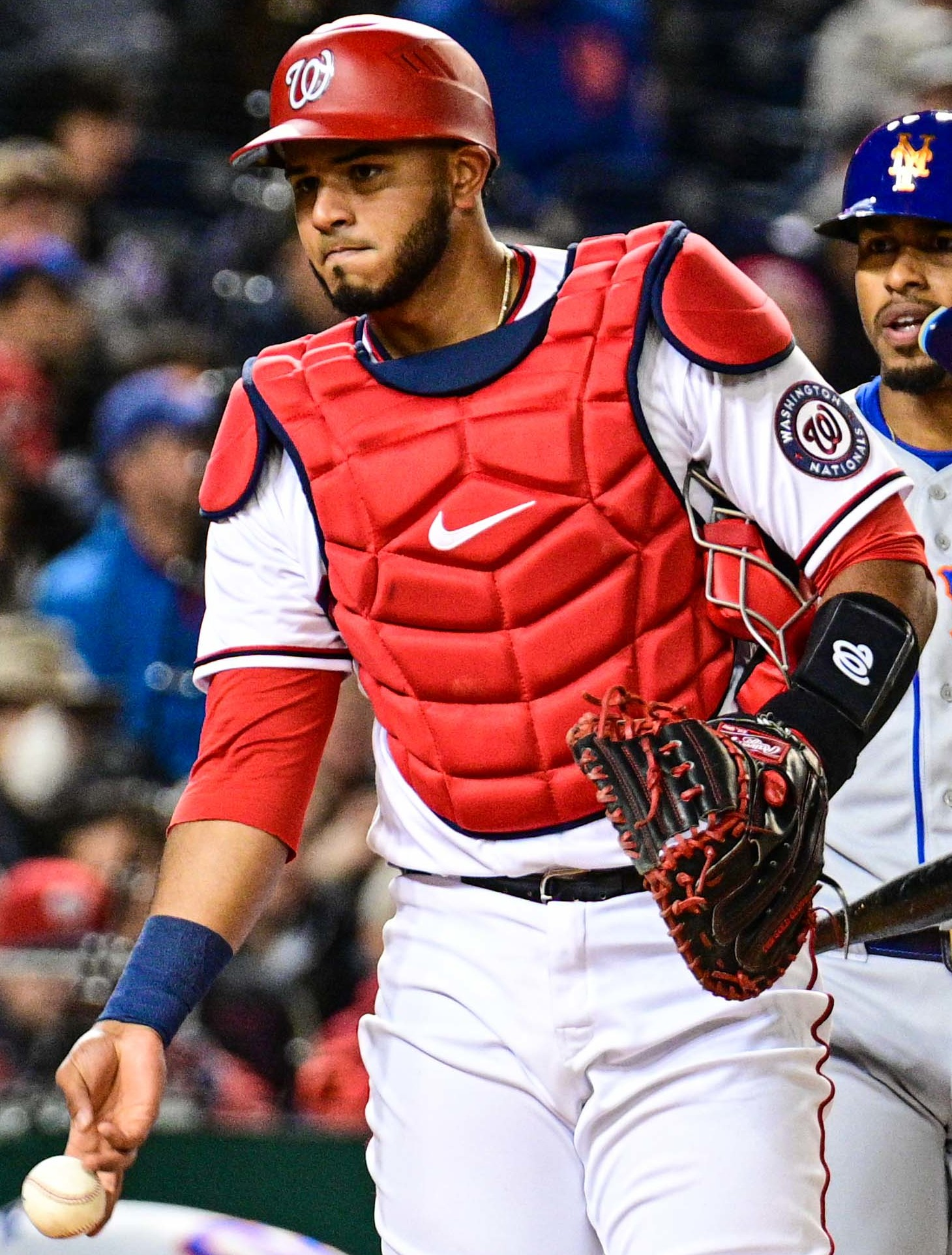
- Ruiz with the Washington Nationals in 2022

Washington Nationals – No. 20
- Catcher
- Born: July 20, 1998 (age 28); Valencia, Venezuela
- Bats: Switch Throws: Right

MLB debut
- August 16, 2020, for the Los Angeles Dodgers

MLB statistics (through 2026 season)
- Batting average: .254
- Home runs: 54
- Runs batted in: 249
- Stats at Baseball Reference

Teams
- Los Angeles Dodgers (2020–2021); Washington Nationals (2021–present)

Career highlights and awards
- World Series Champion (2020); Hit a home run in first major league at-bat (2020)

Keibert Jose Ruiz (born July 20, 1998) is a Venezuelan professional baseball catcher for the Washington Nationals of Major League Baseball (MLB). He has previously played in MLB for the Los Angeles Dodgers.

== Career ==
=== Los Angeles Dodgers ===
Ruiz was signed by the Los Angeles Dodgers as an international free agent in 2014 for $140,000. He made his professional debut with the Dominican Summer League Dodgers in 2015 and spent the whole season there, batting .300 with one home run, 19 RBIs, and eight doubles in 44 games. He spent 2016 with both the Arizona League Dodgers and the Ogden Raptors where he posted a combined .374 batting average with two home runs, 48 RBIs, a .412 OBP and a .939 OPS in 56 total games between both teams. In 2017, he began the year with the Great Lakes Loons where he was selected to the Midwest League mid-season All-Star Team and was then promoted to the Rancho Cucamonga Quakes of the California League. The Dodgers selected him as their Minor League Player of the Year for 2017 after he hit .316 with eight home runs and 51 RBIs in 101 games between Great Lakes and Rancho Cucamonga.

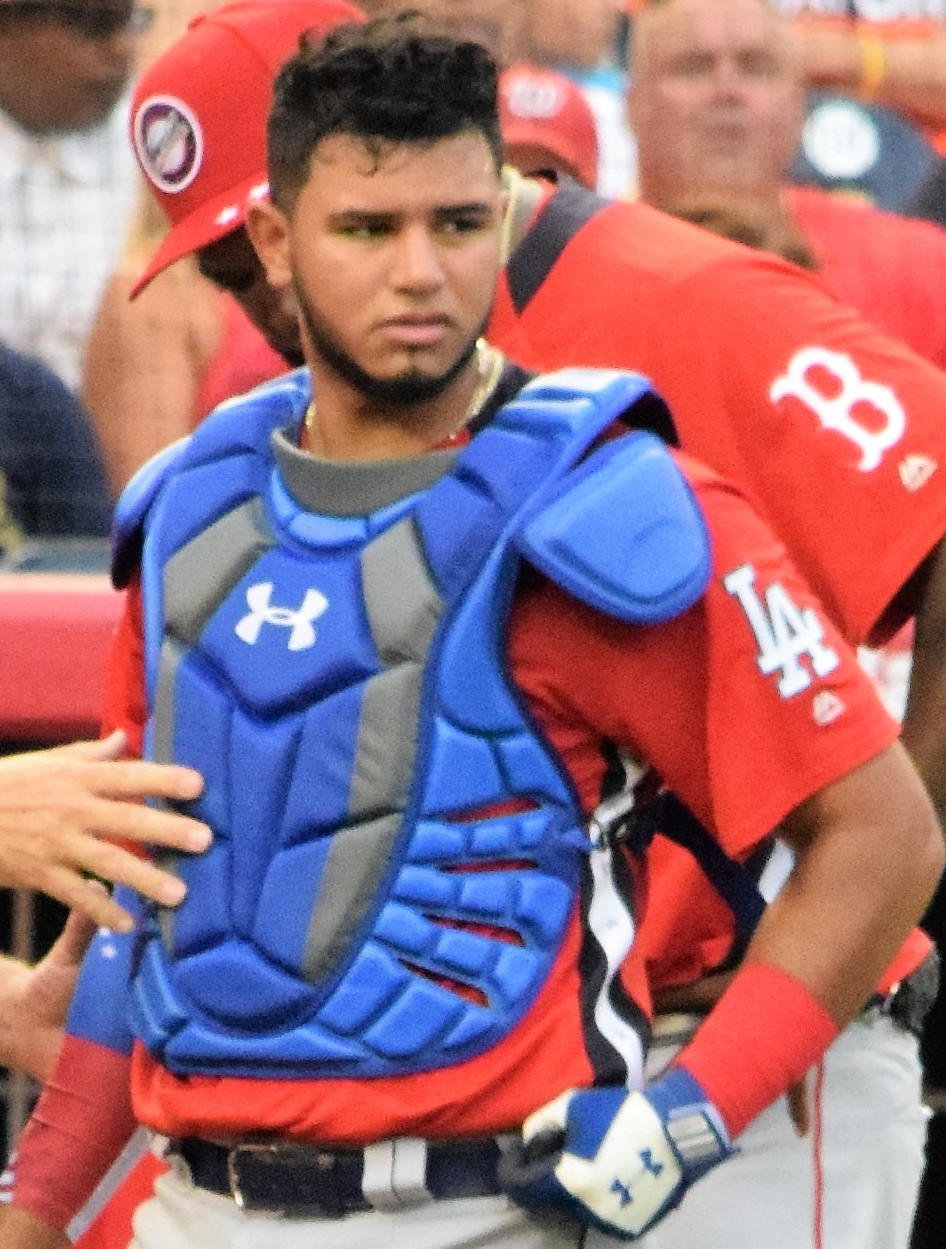
Ruiz at the 2018 All-Star Futures Game

Ruiz was promoted to the Double-A Tulsa Drillers for the 2018 season and was selected to represent them at the mid-season Texas League All-Star Game. He was also selected to the "world" team at the All-Star Futures Game and to the Arizona Fall League Fall Stars game. In 101 games for Tulsa, he hit .268 with 12 home runs and 47 RBIs. The Dodgers added him to their 40-man roster after the 2018 season.

Ruiz began 2019 with Tulsa. He was selected to the mid-season Texas League All-Star Game. Ruiz was promoted to the Triple-A Oklahoma City Dodgers in July. However, he suffered a broken finger in early August that ended his season prematurely. Between the two levels, he hit .261 with six homers and 34 RBI in 85 games in 2019.

Ruiz was called up to the Majors for the first time on August 15, 2020 and made his MLB debut the following day as the starting catcher against the Los Angeles Angels. He hit a home run in his first at-bat, against Julio Teherán of the Angels. He appeared in only two games during the pandemic shortened 2020 season, with two hits in eight at-bats. Ruiz was on the Dodgers roster for the 2020 National League Wild Card Series but did not appear in a game. He was left off the roster for the 2020 National League Division Series.

In 2021, Ruiz appeared in six games for the Dodgers, with one hit (a home run) in seven at-bats. With Oklahoma City, he hit .311 in 52 games with 16 homers and 45 RBI.

=== Washington Nationals ===
On July 30, 2021, the Dodgers traded Ruiz, Josiah Gray, Donovan Casey, and Gerardo Carrillo to the Washington Nationals in exchange for Trea Turner and Max Scherzer. Ruiz homered in his debut as a member of the Nationals organization on August 3, 2021, for the Triple-A Rochester Red Wings. Ruiz was called back up to the Majors on August 30 and made his Nationals debut the same day, going 1-4 against the Philadelphia Phillies. He would finish the season with a .273/.333/.409 slash line with 3 home runs in 96 plate appearances at the MLB level with the Dodgers and the Nationals.

On March 11, 2023, the Nationals announced that Ruiz had signed an eight-year contract extension. The contract, reportedly worth $50 million, ran through 2030, covering his last five seasons of club control and first three years of free agency, and included one-year club options for 2031 and 2032.

In 2025, Ruiz suffered two concussions, the first in a freak accident when he was hit by a foul ball while in the dugout. He missed much of the season, playing in only 68 games for the Nationals. Ruiz returned in the 2026 season, playing in 105 games and slashing .280/.316/.443, with 10 home runs and 48 RBI.

== Personal life ==
Ruiz and his wife have two children.

Until 2025, Ruiz's Venezuelan parents had not seen him play in a game since he was a teenager in the Dominican Summer League in 2015, and had never seen him play in an MLB game. After four visa denials they were finally approved in 2025, and attended a Nationals game on May 22, 2025 in Washington, D.C.. Ruiz went 2-for-5 in the game, including a double and two RBIs, and applied the game-saving tag at home plate in the top of the ninth inning as the Nationals walked off the Atlanta Braves to win their fifth straight. The game was doubly emotional because Ruiz's aunt, his father's sister, had died in Venezuela on that same day.

== Awards and highlights ==
- List of Major League Baseball players with a home run in their first major league at bat
