= Tim Tawa =

American baseball player (born 1999)

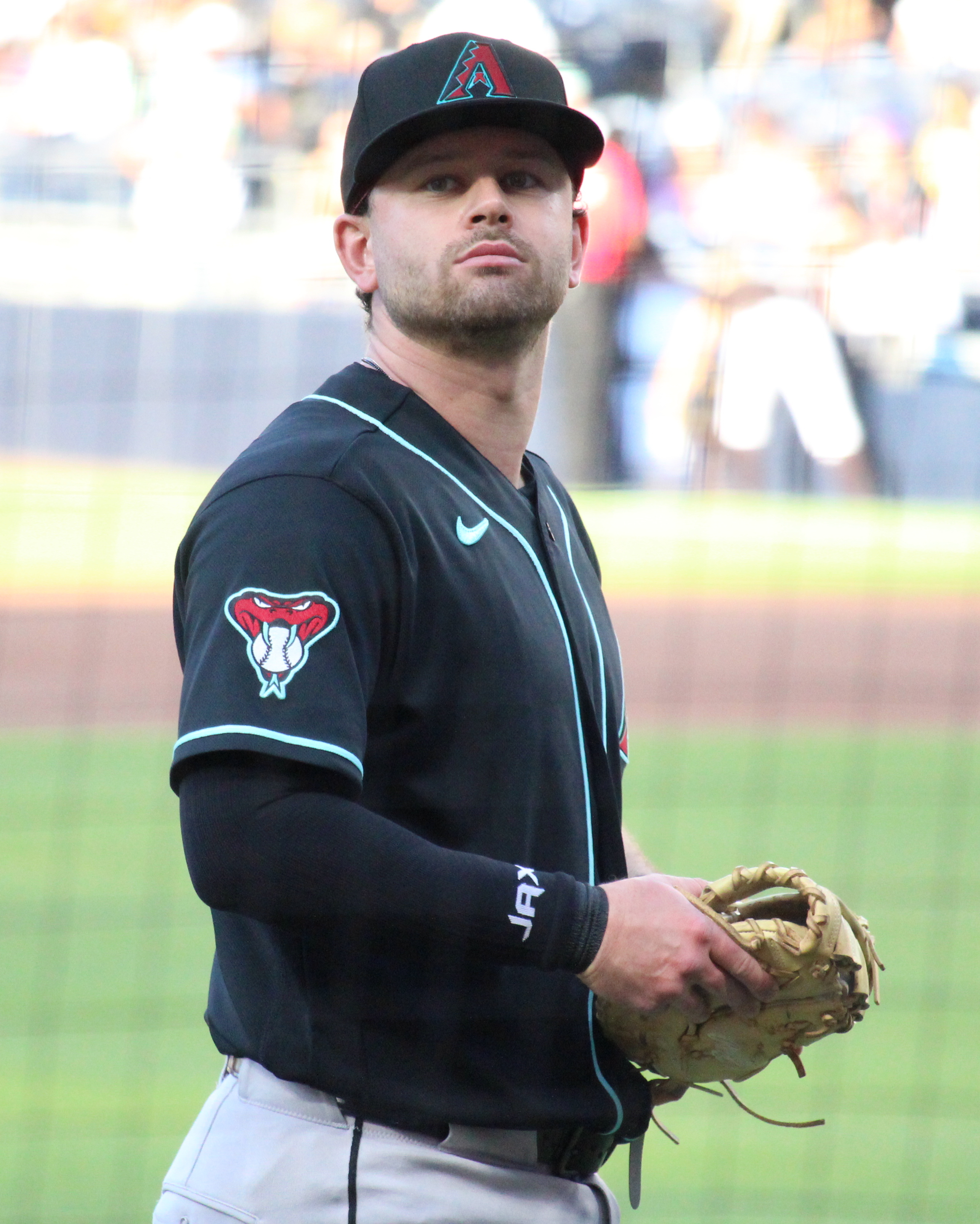
- Tawa with the Diamondbacks in 2026

Arizona Diamondbacks – No. 13
- Utility player
- Born: April 7, 1999 (age 27); Torrance, California, U.S.
- Bats: Right Throws: Right

MLB debut
- April 5, 2025, for the Arizona Diamondbacks

MLB statistics (through 2026 season)
- Batting average: .225
- Home runs: 18
- Runs batted in: 60
- Stats at Baseball Reference

Teams
- Arizona Diamondbacks (2025–present)

Timothy John Tawa (born April 7, 1999) is an American professional baseball utility player for the Arizona Diamondbacks of Major League Baseball (MLB). He made his MLB debut in 2025.

== Amateur career ==
Tawa attended West Linn High School in West Linn, Oregon. He played quarterback and set Oregon state records with 11,337 passing yards, 143 touchdown passes and 714 completions. As a senior, he won a state championship over Central Catholic High School. He shared a backfield with running back Elijah Molden. Alex Forsyth was an offensive lineman for Tawa throughout their youth and high school football careers. His head coach at West Linn was Chris Miller. Tawa was named Gatorade's Player of the Year in Oregon for football three times and in baseball one time. He was also named the MaxPreps Male High School Athlete of the Year.

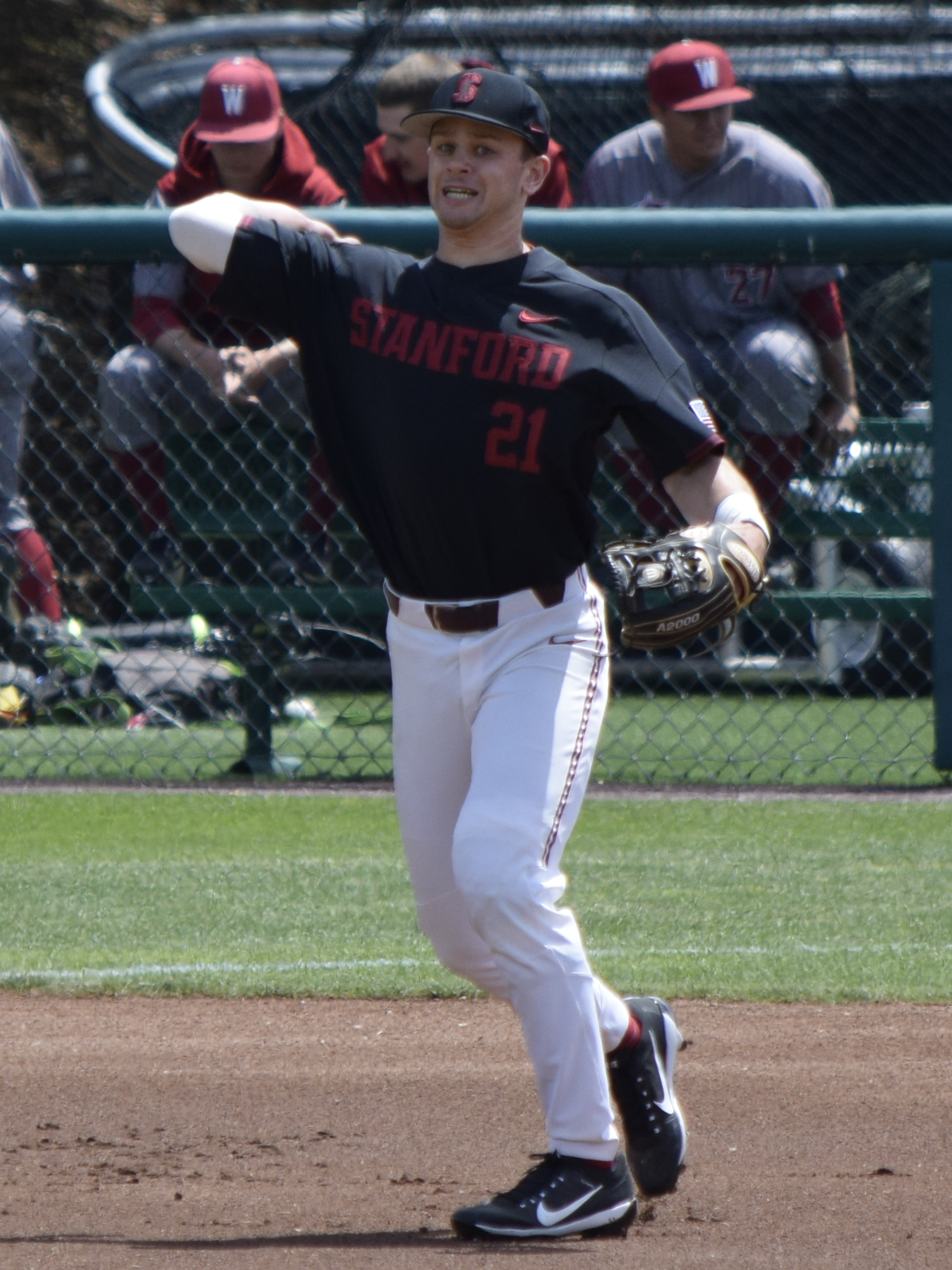
Tawa at Stanford in 2018

Tawa attended Stanford University, where he played college baseball for the Stanford Cardinal. He chose to play only baseball in college because he liked the sport more than football and he felt he was "more projectable" as a professional baseball player. In 2019, he played collegiate summer baseball with the Falmouth Commodores of the Cape Cod Baseball League.

== Professional career ==
The Arizona Diamondbacks selected Tawa in the 11th round, with the 318th overall selection, of the 2021 Major League Baseball draft. He split his first professional season between the rookie–level Arizona Complex League Diamondbacks and Single–A Visalia Rawhide, hitting .269 with six home runs, 22 RBI, and 14 stolen bases across 38 total games.

Tawa spent the 2022 season with the High–A Hillsboro Hops and Double–A Amarillo Sod Poodles, accumulating a .239/.331/.369 batting line with 13 home runs, 53 RBI, and 11 stolen bases over 118 appearances. He returned to Amarillo in 2023, playing in 116 games and hitting .256/.338/.461 with 22 home runs, 75 RBI, and 11 stolen bases.

Tawa split the 2024 campaign between Double–A Amarillo and the Triple–A Reno Aces, slashing .279/.349/.519 with 31 home runs, 90 RBI, and 14 stolen bases. On November 19, 2024, the Diamondbacks added Tawa to their 40-man roster to protect him from the Rule 5 draft.

The Diamondbacks optioned Tawa to Triple-A Reno to begin the 2025 season. On April 5, 2025, Tawa was promoted to the major leagues for the first time following an injury to Ketel Marte. He made his MLB debut that day against the Washington Nationals, and recorded his first career hit. On April 16, Tawa hit his first career home run off of Tyler Phillips of the Miami Marlins. Tawa made 74 appearances for the Diamondbacks during his rookie campaign, batting .201/.274/.347 with seven home runs, 18 RBI, and eight stolen bases.

On April 26, 2026, Tawa hit a grand slam off of David Morgan that helped fuel Arizona to a 12-7 victory over the San Diego Padres in the final game of the MLB Mexico City Series.
