= Manuel Peña =

Manuel Peña may refer to:

== Politics ==
- Juan Manuel de la Peña Bonifaz (died 1669), Spanish politician in the Philippines
- Manuel de la Peña y Peña (1780-1850), Mexican politician
- Manuel la Peña (fl 1808-1811), Spanish military officer
- Manuel Arturo Peña Batlle (1902-1954), Dominican politician
- Manuel "Lito" Peña (1924-2012), US politician

== Sports ==
- Manolo Peña (1965-2012), Spanish professional footballer
- Juan Manuel Peña (born 1973), Bolivian professional footballer
- Manuel Pena Garces (born 1983), Spanish Basketball Coach
- Manuel Peña López (born 1998), Argentine tennis player
