= Juan Morillo (baseball, born 1999) =

Venezuelan baseball player (born 1999)

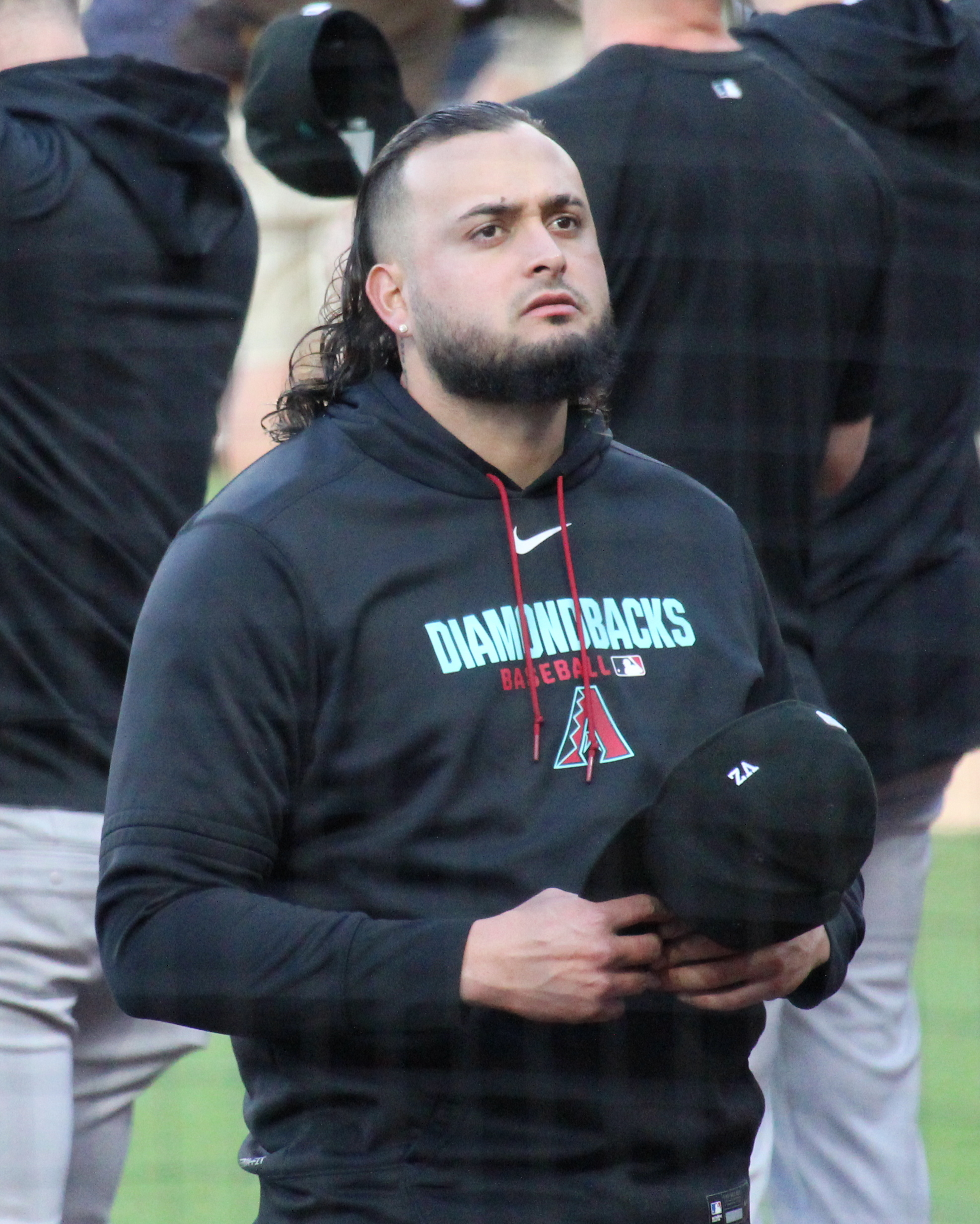
- Morillo in 2026 with the Diamondbacks

Arizona Diamondbacks – No. 62
- Pitcher
- Born: March 19, 1999 (age 27); Maracaibo, Venezuela
- Bats: Right Throws: Right

MLB debut
- April 19, 2025, for the Arizona Diamondbacks

MLB statistics (through 2026 season)
- Win–loss record: 5–7
- Earned run average: 2.92
- Strikeouts: 110
- Stats at Baseball Reference

Teams
- Arizona Diamondbacks (2025–present)

Juan Diego Morillo (born March 19, 1999) is a Venezuelan professional baseball pitcher for the Arizona Diamondbacks of Major League Baseball (MLB). He made his MLB debut in 2025.

== Career ==
=== Los Angeles Dodgers ===
On September 13, 2015, Morillo signed with the Los Angeles Dodgers as an international free agent. He spent the first two seasons of his professional career with the Dominican Summer League Dodgers.

Morillo made 6 appearances for the rookie-level Arizona League Dodgers in 2018. He returned to the affiliate for the 2019 campaign, also making 3 starts for the Ogden Raptors, and posted a cumulative 2-2 record and 2.93 ERA with 75 strikeouts across 58 1/3 innings pitched. Morillo did not play in a game in 2020 due to the cancellation of the minor league season because of the COVID-19 pandemic.

Morillo made one scoreless outing for the High-A Great Lakes Loons in 2021, but missed the remainder of the year and all of the 2022 campaign due to injury. He returned to action in 2023 with the Single-A Rancho Cucamonga Quakes and Great Lakes. In 35 appearances split between the two affiliates, Morillo compiled an 0-2 record and 4.86 ERA with 48 strikeouts and four saves across 33 1/3 innings pitched.

Morillo spent the 2024 campaign with the Double-A Tulsa Drillers, registering a 5-2 record and 4.76 ERA with 50 strikeouts across 41 appearances out of the bullpen. He elected free agency following the season on November 4, 2024.

=== Arizona Diamondbacks ===
On November 14, 2024, Morillo signed a minor league contract with the Arizona Diamondbacks. He was assigned to the Triple-A Reno Aces to begin the 2025 season.

On April 19, 2025, the Diamondbacks promoted Morillo to the major leagues for the first time. Morillo made his debut later that day against the Chicago Cubs, pitching one scoreless inning and striking out two batters. He made 42 appearances for Arizona during his rookie campaign, compiling an 0–3 record and 4.19 ERA with 36 strikeouts and one save across 34 1/3 innings pitched.

On April 18, 2026, Morillo recorded his first career win, tossing 1 1/3 scoreless innings against the Toronto Blue Jays.
