= José Fernández (infielder) =

Venezuelan baseball player (born 2003)

Arizona Diamondbacks – No. 11
- Infielder
- Born: September 22, 2003 (age 23); Cumana, Venezuela
- Bats: Right Throws: Right

MLB debut
- March 31, 2026, for the Arizona Diamondbacks

MLB statistics (through 2026 season)
- Batting average: .255
- Home runs: 3
- Runs batted in: 16
- Stats at Baseball Reference

Teams
- Arizona Diamondbacks (2026–present)

José Luis Fernández (born September 22, 2003) is a Venezuelan professional baseball infielder for the Arizona Diamondbacks of Major League Baseball (MLB). He made his debut in 2026.

== Career ==
Fernández signed with the Arizona Diamondbacks as an international free agent on February 5, 2021. He made his professional debut with the rookie–level Arizona Complex League Diamondbacks, hitting .250 across 36 games. Fernández returned to the ACL Diamondbacks for the 2022 season, slashing .217/.291/.309 with one home run, 15 RBI, and two stolen bases in 50 games.

Fernández spent the 2023 season with the High–A Visalia Rawhide, hitting .262/.320/.377 with five home runs, 44 RBI, and nine stolen bases spanning 95 games. He split the 2024 campaign between the High–A Hillsboro Hops and Double–A Amarillo Sod Poodles. In 103 appearances for the two affiliates, Fernández batted a cumulative .253/.289/.341 with seven home runs, 43 RBI, and 10 stolen bases.

Fernández made 122 appearances for Double-A Amarillo in 2025, slashing .272/.321/.454 with 17 home runs, 80 RBI, and 12 stolen bases. On November 18, 2025, the Diamondbacks added Fernández to their 40-man roster to protect him from the Rule 5 draft.

Fernández was optioned to the Triple-A Reno Aces to begin the 2026 season. On March 30, 2026, the Diamondbacks promoted Fernández to the major leagues for the first time. In Fernández's debut game against the Detroit Tigers, he recorded three hits, two of those being home runs, becoming only the eighth player in MLB history to hit two home runs on their regular season debut.
