= Shaun Larkin =

American baseball player and coach (born 1979)

Arizona Diamondbacks – No. 88
- Coach
- Born: September 7, 1979 (age 46); Garden Grove, California, U.S.
- Bats: Left Throws: Right

Teams
- Arizona Diamondbacks (2025–present)

Shaun Michael Larkin (born September 7, 1979) is an American professional baseball coach for the Arizona Diamondbacks of Major League Baseball (MLB).

== Career ==
Larkin attended La Quinta High School in Westminster, California, and California State University, Northridge, where he played college baseball for the Cal State Northridge Matadors.

The Cleveland Indians selected Larkin in the ninth round of the 2002 MLB draft and he played in Minor League Baseball through the 2006 season. After he retired as a player, he became a coach and front office executive. On November 18, 2024, the Diamondbacks named Larkin their third base coach. He was removed from the role as third base coach on August 20, 2025, though remained on the Diamondbacks staff in a different capacity.
