= Mitch Bratt =

Canadian baseball player (born 2003)

Arizona Diamondbacks – No. 60
- Pitcher
- Born: July 3, 2003 (age 23); Newmarket, Ontario, Canada
- Bats: Left Throws: Left

MLB debut
- June 24, 2026, for the Arizona Diamondbacks

MLB statistics (through 2026 season)
- Win–loss record: 1-3
- Earned run average: 4.70
- Strikeouts: 30
- Stats at Baseball Reference

Teams
- Arizona Diamondbacks (2026–present)

Mitchell Eric Bratt (born July 3, 2003) is a Canadian professional baseball pitcher for the Arizona Diamondbacks of Major League Baseball (MLB). He debuted in MLB in 2026.

== Career ==
=== Texas Rangers ===
Bratt grew up in Newmarket, Ontario, and attended Newmarket High School. After most Canadian baseball leagues were shut down due to COVID-19, he pitched for Georgia Premier Academy in Statesboro, Georgia while completing his final year of high school online. Bratt played summer collegiate baseball after his senior year for the West Virginia Black Bears of the MLB Draft League and had a 2.57 ERA and 44 strikeouts in 28 innings pitched.

The Texas Rangers selected Bratt in the fifth round of the 2021 Major League Baseball draft. After signing with the team he was assigned to ACL Rangers of the Rookie-level Arizona Complex League, where he did not allow an earned run and struck out 13 batters in six innings pitched. Bratt spent the 2022 season with the Down East Wood Ducks of the Low-A Carolina League, going 5–5 with a 2.45 ERA and 99 strikeouts over 80 2/3 innings. Bratt was the recipient of the 2022 Wayne Norton Award, as the top Canadian MiLB player for that season. Bratt missed two months of the 2023 season due to injury. Bratt spent the 2023 season with the Hickory Crawdads of the High-A South Atlantic League, going 2–3 with a 3.54 ERA and 73 strikeouts over 61 innings. Following the 2023 season, Bratt played for the Surprise Saguaros of the Arizona Fall League. He split the 2024 season between Hickory and the Frisco RoughRiders of the Double-A Texas League, going a combined 8–6 with a 3.75 ERA and 117 strikeouts over 110 1/3 innings. Bratt opened the 2025 season back with Frisco, going 6–3 with a 3.18 ERA and 106 strikeouts over 90 2/3 innings.

=== Arizona Diamondbacks ===
On July 31, 2025, the Rangers traded Bratt, Kohl Drake, and David Hagaman to the Arizona Diamondbacks in exchange for Merrill Kelly. He made six starts down the stretch for the Double-A Amarillo Sod Poodles, posting a 1-1 record and 3.98 ERA with 42 strikeouts across 31 2/3 innings pitched. On November 18, the Diamondbacks added Bratt to their 40-man roster to protect him from the Rule 5 draft. The Diamondbacks optioned Bratt to Triple-A Reno Aces to begin the 2026 season.

The Diamondbacks promoted Bratt to the major leagues for the first time on June 24, 2026. He made his debut the same day against the St. Louis Cardinals, pitching three innings and striking out three batters.

== International career ==
On March 13, 2023, at just 19 years old, Bratt started game two for Canada in the 2023 World Baseball Classic. He gave up six runs and recorded just one out.
