= Brandyn Garcia =

American baseball player (born 2000)

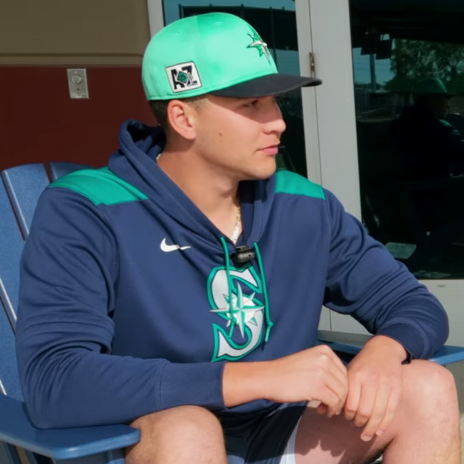
- Garcia in 2025 with the Seattle Mariners

Arizona Diamondbacks – No. 55
- Pitcher
- Born: May 27, 2000 (age 26); Newport, Rhode Island, U.S.
- Bats: Left Throws: Left

MLB debut
- July 21, 2025, for the Seattle Mariners

MLB statistics (through 2026 season)
- Win–loss record: 0–3
- Earned run average: 2.74
- Strikeouts: 74
- Stats at Baseball Reference

Teams
- Seattle Mariners (2025); Arizona Diamondbacks (2025–present)

Brandyn Michael Garcia (born May 27, 2000) is an American professional baseball pitcher for the Arizona Diamondbacks of Major League Baseball (MLB). He has previously played in MLB for the Seattle Mariners.

== Amateur career ==
Garcia attended The Master's School in Simsbury, Connecticut. He enrolled at Quinnipiac University and played college baseball for the Quinnipiac Bobcats. He transferred to Texas A&M University to continue playing for the Texas A&M Aggies.

== Professional career ==
=== Seattle Mariners ===
Garcia was selected by the Seattle Mariners in the 11th round, with the 337th overall pick, of the 2023 Major League Baseball draft. Garcia spent his first professional season with the rookie-level Arizona Complex League Mariners and Modesto Nuts. He pitched 2024 with the Everett Aquasox and Arkansas Travelers. He returned to Arkansas to begin the 2025 season.

On July 21, 2025, the Mariners promoted Garcia to the major leagues for the first time; he made his MLB debut the same day against the Milwaukee Brewers.

=== Arizona Diamondbacks ===
On July 24, 2025, the Mariners traded Garcia and Ashton Izzi to the Arizona Diamondbacks in exchange for Josh Naylor.
