= José Cabrera (baseball, born 2002) =

Dominican baseball player (born 2002)

Arizona Diamondbacks – No. 53
- Pitcher
- Born: May 30, 2002 (age 24); Yaguate, Dominican Republic
- Bats: Right Throws: Right

MLB debut
- June 21, 2026, for the Arizona Diamondbacks

MLB statistics (through 2026 season)
- Win–loss record: 0-4
- Earned run average: 5.72
- Strikeouts: 20
- Stats at Baseball Reference

Teams
- Arizona Diamondbacks (2026–present)

José Manuel Cabrera (born May 30, 2002) is a Dominican professional baseball pitcher for the Arizona Diamondbacks of Major League Baseball (MLB).

== Career ==
Cabrera signed with the Arizona Diamondbacks as an international free agent on September 24, 2021.

Cabrera started 2026 with the Double-A Amarillo Sod Poodles before being promoted to the Triple-A Reno Aces. On June 21, 2026, Cabrera was promoted to the major leagues for the first time.
