= LuJames Groover =

American baseball player (born 2002)

Arizona Diamondbacks – No. 16
- First baseman / Third baseman
- Born: April 16, 2002 (age 24); East Point, Georgia, U.S.
- Bats: Right Throws: Right

MLB debut
- June 5, 2026, for the Arizona Diamondbacks

MLB statistics (through 2026 season)
- Batting average: .167
- Home runs: 1
- Runs batted in: 4
- Stats at Baseball Reference

Teams
- Arizona Diamondbacks (2026–present)

LuJames Groover III (born April 16, 2002) is an American professional baseball first baseman and third baseman for the Arizona Diamondbacks of Major League Baseball (MLB). He made his MLB debut in 2026.

== Amateur career ==
Groover grew up in Morrow, Georgia and attended The Walker School in Marietta, Georgia.

Groover enrolled at the University of North Carolina at Charlotte began his collegiate baseball career for the Charlotte 49ers. In his freshman year in 2021, batting with a .351 with four home runs and 14 doubles. That summer, he played collegiate summer baseball with the Wisconsin Woodchucks of the Northwoods League. He transferred to North Carolina State University to play for the NC State Wolfpack for his sophomore year. In 2022, he again played collegiate summer baseball, this time with the Harwich Mariners of the Cape Cod Baseball League. As a junior for NC State in 2023, he played in 57 games and hit .332 with 13 home runs and 50 RBI. Groover also excelled in the NCAA Tournament, where he went 4-for-12 with two home runs in three regional games.

== Professional career ==
The Arizona Diamondbacks selected Groover in the second round, with the 48th overall selection, of the 2023 Major League Baseball draft. On July 18, 2023, Groover signed with the Diamondbacks.

Groover made his professional debut after signing with the Arizona Complex League Diamondbacks and also played with the Hillsboro Hops, batting .283 with one home run over 27 games. Groover was placed on the injured list early in the 2024 season after breaking his wrist. He played rehab assignments with the ACL Diamondbacks before being assigned to Hillsboro, and he also played with the Amarillo Sod Poodles. Over 61 games played for the season, Groover hit .281 with ten home runs and 35 RBI. After the season, he played in the Arizona Fall League with the Salt River Rafters. He was assigned to Amarillo to open the 2025 season. Groover was selected to represent the Diamondbacks at the 2025 All-Star Futures Game at Truist Park.

Groover was assigned to the Triple-A Reno Aces to begin the 2026 season, where he slashed .322/.421/.452 with three home runs, 39 RBI, and two stolen bases. On June 5, 2026, Groover was selected to the 40-man roster and promoted to the major leagues for the first time. On June 24, Groover hit his first career home run off of Matthew Liberatore of the St. Louis Cardinals.

== Personal life ==
Parents are LuJames II and LeSonya. He has two brothers, Marcus and Cordero and one sister, Ariana. Hobbies include playing video games and watching movies. He majored in communications.
