= Gerardo Carrillo =

Mexican baseball player (born 1998)

Arizona Diamondbacks – No. 68
- Pitcher
- Born: September 13, 1998 (age 28); Guadalajara, Mexico
- Bats: Right Throws: Right

MLB debut
- July 22, 2026, for the Arizona Diamondbacks

MLB statistics (through 2026 season)
- Win–loss record: 3–1
- Earned run average: 4.15
- Strikeouts: 21
- Stats at Baseball Reference

Teams
- Arizona Diamondbacks (2026–present)

Gerardo Carrillo (born September 13, 1998) is a Mexican professional baseball pitcher for the Arizona Diamondbacks of Major League Baseball (MLB). He made his MLB debut in 2026.

== Career ==
=== Los Angeles Dodgers ===
Carrillo signed with the Los Angeles Dodgers as an international free agent on July 5, 2016, and began his professional career the following year with the Dominican Summer League Dodgers. He played for the Arizona League Dodgers and Great Lakes Loons in 2018 and the Rancho Cucamonga Quakes in 2019. Carrillo did not play in a game in 2020 due to the cancellation of the minor league season because of the COVID-19 pandemic.

On November 20, 2020, the Dodgers added Carrillo to their 40-man roster to protect him from the Rule 5 draft. He began the 2021 season with the Double-A Tulsa Drillers, where he recorded a 3–2 record with a 4.25 ERA and 108 strikeouts in 15 games.

=== Washington Nationals ===
On July 30, 2021, Carrillo was traded to the Washington Nationals along with Keibert Ruiz, Donovan Casey, and Josiah Gray in exchange for Max Scherzer and Trea Turner. He spent the remainder of the year with the Double-A Harrisburg Senators, for whom he logged a 0–5 record and 5.59 ERA with 38 strikeouts across eight starts.

In 2022, Carrillo made 21 appearances for the rookie-level Florida Complex League Nationals, High-A Wilmington Blue Rocks, and Harrisburg, posting a cumulative 2–1 record and 6.94 ERA with 28 strikeouts and two saves across 23 1/3 innings pitched. He was designated for assignment on December 20, 2022, following the signing of Erasmo Ramírez. Carrillo cleared waivers and was sent outright to the Triple–A Rochester Red Wings on December 23.

Carrillo began the 2023 season with Double-A Harrisburg but made only two scoreless appearances throughout the year due to injury. He elected free agency following the season on November 6, 2023.

=== Texas Rangers ===
On December 27, 2023, Carrillo signed a minor league contract with the Texas Rangers. On March 6, 2024, Carrillo underwent Tommy John surgery, ruling him out for the entirety of the season.

Carrillo returned to action in 2025, splitting the campaign between the Double-A Frisco RoughRiders and Triple-A Round Rock Express, for whom he accumulated a 2–3 record and 3.88 ERA with 56 strikeouts and seven saves across 42 relief appearances. Carrillo elected free agency following the season on November 6, 2025.

=== Arizona Diamondbacks ===
On December 5, 2025, Carrillo signed a minor league contract with the Arizona Diamondbacks. He made 33 appearances for the Triple-A Reno Aces, compiling a 7–3 record and 4.15 ERA with 57 strikeouts and four saves across 43 1/3 innings pitched. On July 18, 2026, the Diamondbacks added Carrillo to their 40-man roster and subsequently optioned him back to Triple-A Reno. On July 21, Carrillo was promoted to the major leagues for the first time. He made his major league debut the following day against the Athletics. On July 28, Carrillo recorded his first career win, tossing two scoreless innings of relief during an 8–7, extra–inning victory over the Pittsburgh Pirates.

== Winter leagues ==
During the 2022–23, 2023–24, and 2025–26 offseasons, Carrillo pitched for the Charros de Jalisco of the Mexican Pacific League.
