= Kohl Drake =

American baseball player (born 2000)

Arizona Diamondbacks – No. 58
- Pitcher
- Born: July 17, 2000 (age 26); Orem, Utah, U.S.
- Bats: Left Throws: Left

MLB debut
- July 21, 2026, for the Arizona Diamondbacks

MLB statistics (through 2026 season)
- Win–loss record: 0–1
- Earned run average: 6.53
- Strikeouts: 17
- Stats at Baseball Reference

Teams
- Arizona Diamondbacks (2026–present)

Kohl Everett-Scott Drake (born July 17, 2000) is an American professional baseball pitcher for the Arizona Diamondbacks of Major League Baseball (MLB). He made his MLB debut in 2026.

== Amateur career ==
Drake grew up in Sachse, Texas, and attended Wylie High School in Wylie, Texas. Undrafted out of high school, he attended Arkansas Tech University to play college baseball. In his freshman season of 2019, he had a 1–3 win–loss record with a 6.21 earned run average (ERA) over 33 1/3 innings. He transferred to San Joaquin Delta College after that season. In the COVID shortened season of 2020, Drake went 1–0 with a 2.57 ERA over 21 innings.

Drake transferred to Walters State Community College ahead of the 2021 season. He produced a 9–3 record with a 3.72 ERA and 107 strikeouts over 72 2/3 innings in 2021. In 2022, Drake went 14–0 with 160 strikeouts over 93 1/3 innings. He was named the 2022 NJCAA DI Baseball Pitcher of the Year. Drake appeared in one game for the Mahoning Valley Scrappers of the MLB Draft League. Drake was drafted by the Texas Rangers in the 11th round of the 2022 MLB draft and signed with them.

== Professional career ==
=== Texas Rangers ===
Drake split his debut season of 2023 between the ACL Rangers of the Rookie-level Arizona Complex League and the Down East Wood Ducks of the Low-A Carolina League, going a combined 2–5 with a 6.36 ERA and 55 strikeouts over 46 2/3 innings. Drake returned to Down East to open the 2024 season, going 2–1 with a 1.67 ERA and 71 strikeouts over 43 innings. He was promoted to the Hickory Crawdads of the High-A South Atlantic League, going 5–3 with a 2.53 ERA and 57 strikeouts over 42 2/3 innings. He was promoted to the Frisco RoughRiders of the Double-A Texas League in August.

=== Arizona Diamondbacks ===
On July 31, 2025, Drake, along with Mitch Bratt and David Hagaman, were traded to the Arizona Diamondbacks in exchange for Merrill Kelly. He made four appearances down the stretch for the Triple-A Reno Aces, but struggled to a 1–2 record and 9.18 ERA with 19 strikeouts across 16 2/3 innings pitched. On November 18, the Diamondbacks added Drake to their 40-man roster to protect him from the Rule 5 draft.

Drake was optioned to Triple-A Reno to begin the 2026 season. In his first 14 starts for the Aces, he posted a 1–5 record and 7.83 ERA with 48 strikeouts. On June 21, 2026, Drake was promoted to the major leagues for the first time. He was optioned back to Reno on June 24 without having appeared for Arizona, becoming a phantom ballplayer. On July 21, Drake was promoted back to the major leagues and made his debut.
