= Ryan Waldschmidt =

American baseball player (born 2002)

Arizona Diamondbacks – No. 15
- Outfielder
- Born: October 7, 2002 (age 24); Sarasota, Florida, U.S.
- Bats: Right Throws: Right

MLB debut
- May 8, 2026, for the Arizona Diamondbacks

MLB statistics (through 2026 season)
- Batting average: .256
- Home runs: 3
- Runs batted in: 22
- Stats at Baseball Reference

Teams
- Arizona Diamondbacks (2026–present)

Ryan Jeffery Waldschmidt (born October 7, 2002) is an American professional baseball outfielder for the Arizona Diamondbacks of Major League Baseball (MLB). He made his MLB debut in 2026.

== Amateur career ==
Waldschmidt attended Braden River High School in Bradenton, Florida. He started his college baseball career at Charleston Southern University. As a freshman in 2022, he started 48 of 52 games and hit .310/.485/.559 with nine home runs and 43 runs batted in (RBI). After the season, he transferred to the University of Kentucky. In his first year at Kentucky, he played in 59 games and hit .290/.427/.445 with five home runs and 37 RBI. After the season, he played collegiate summer baseball with the Cotuit Kettleers of the Cape Cod Baseball League for four games before suffering a torn ACL. He returned from the injury in 2024 to hit .333/.469/.610 with 14 home runs and 46 RBI over 59 games.

== Professional career ==
Waldschmidt was considered a top prospect for the 2024 Major League Baseball draft. The Arizona Diamondbacks subsequently drafted him with the 31st overall selection. On July 24, 2024, Waldschmidt signed with Arizona on a $2.9 million contract. He made his professional debut with the Single-A Visalia Rawhide, hitting .273 with seven RBI and four stolen bases.

Waldschmidt split the 2025 campaign between the High–A Hillsboro Hops and Double–A Amarillo Sod Poodles. In 134 appearances for the two affiliates, he batted a cumulative .289/.419/.473 with 14 home runs, 46 RBI, and 25 stolen bases.

Waldschmidt began the 2026 season with the Triple-A Reno Aces, batting .289/.400/.477 with three home runs, 22 RBI, and six stolen bases across his first 34 appearances. On May 8, 2026, Waldschmidt was selected to the 40-man roster and promoted to the major leagues for the first time. On July 22, Waldschmidt hit his first career home run off of Yunior Tur of the Athletics.
