= Juan Burgos =

Dominican baseball player (born 1999)

Arizona Diamondbacks – No. 52
- Pitcher
- Born: 22 December 1999 (age 26); Santiago, Dominican Republic
- Bats: Right Throws: Right

MLB debut
- 1 July, 2025, for the Seattle Mariners

MLB statistics (through 2026 season)
- Win–loss record: 1–1
- Earned run average: 5.09
- Strikeouts: 14
- Stats at Baseball Reference

Teams
- Seattle Mariners (2025); Arizona Diamondbacks (2025–present)

Juan Burgos (born 22 December 1999) is a Dominican professional baseball pitcher for the Arizona Diamondbacks of Major League Baseball (MLB). He has previously played in MLB for the Seattle Mariners.

== Career ==
=== Seattle Mariners ===
On 15 April 2019, Burgos signed with the Seattle Mariners as an international free agent. He made his professional debut with the Dominican Summer League Mariners. Burgos did not play in a game in 2020 due to the cancellation of the minor league season because of the COVID-19 pandemic.

Burgos returned to action in 2021 with the rookie-level Arizona Complex League Mariners and Single-A Modesto Nuts. In 14 appearances for the two affiliates, he recorded a cumulative 4.41 ERA with 19 strikeouts and six saves across 16 1/3 innings pitched. Burgos returned to the ACL Mariners and Modesto in 2022, posting a combined 2-0 record and 2.70 ERA with 46 strikeouts and one save over 26 games (three starts).

Burgos returned to Modesto for a third consecutive season in 2023, registering a 1-1 record and 2.53 ERA with 39 strikeouts and seven saves across 30 appearances out of the bullpen. In 2024, Burgos made 38 appearances for the High-A Everett AquaSox, in which he pitched to a 2-5 record and 3.38 ERA with 70 strikeouts and five saves across 61 1/3 innings pitched.

Burgos began the 2025 season with the Double-A Arkansas Travelers, logging a 2–1 record and 0.64 ERA with 29 strikeouts and three saves over 21 games; he also made one scoreless appearance for the Triple-A Tacoma Rainiers. On 28 June 2025, Burgos was selected to the 40-man roster and promoted to the major leagues for the first time. In four appearances for Seattle, he recorded a 4.05 ERA with eight strikeouts across 6 2/3 innings of work.

=== Arizona Diamondbacks ===
On 31 July 2025, the Mariners traded Burgos, Tyler Locklear and Hunter Cranton to the Arizona Diamondbacks in exchange for Eugenio Suárez. On 19 August, Burgos recorded his first career win, tossing 1/3 of a scoreless inning against the Cleveland Guardians. He made nine appearances for the Diamondbacks, posting a 1-1 record and 8.10 ERA with six strikeouts across 6 2/3 innings pitched.

Burgos was optioned to the Triple-A Reno Aces to begin the 2026 season.
