= Kade Strowd =

American baseball player (born 1997)

Arizona Diamondbacks – No. 24
- Pitcher
- Born: September 17, 1997 (age 29); Fort Worth, Texas, U.S.
- Bats: Right Throws: Right

MLB debut
- May 18, 2025, for the Baltimore Orioles

MLB statistics (through 2026 season)
- Win–loss record: 0–1
- Earned run average: 1.86
- Strikeouts: 25
- Stats at Baseball Reference

Teams
- Baltimore Orioles (2025); Arizona Diamondbacks (2026–present)

Randall Kade Strowd (born September 17, 1997) is an American professional baseball pitcher for the Arizona Diamondbacks of Major League Baseball (MLB). He has previously played in MLB for the Baltimore Orioles, for whom he made his MLB debut in 2025.

== Career ==
=== Baltimore Orioles ===
Strowd was drafted by the Baltimore Orioles in the 12th round, with the 348th overall selection, of the 2019 Major League Baseball draft. He made his professional debut with the Low–A Aberdeen IronBirds. Strowd did not play in a game in 2020 due to the cancellation of the minor league season because of the COVID-19 pandemic. He returned to action in 2021 with High–A Aberdeen, making 21 appearances and struggling to an 0–3 record and 8.05 ERA with 45 strikeouts over 38 innings pitched.

Strowd split the 2022 campaign between Aberdeen and the rookie–level Florida Complex League Orioles. In 13 games split between the two affiliates, he compiled a 2–1 record and 1.06 ERA with 24 strikeouts over 17 innings of work. Strowd spent the 2023 season with the Double–A Bowie Baysox, registering a 4–1 record and 5.20 ERA with 67 strikeouts and 2 saves across 55 1/3 innings pitched.

In 46 appearances split between Double–A Bowie and the Triple–A Norfolk Tides, he compiled a 6–3 record and 5.44 ERA with 71 strikeouts across 51 1/3 innings pitched. On November 19, 2024, the Orioles added Strowd to their 40-man roster to protect him from the Rule 5 draft.

Strowd was optioned to Triple-A Norfolk to begin the 2025 season. On April 28, 2025, Strowd was promoted to the major leagues for the first time; and was optioned back to Triple-A the following day without making an appearance, briefly becoming a phantom ballplayer. On May 18, Strowd was recalled to the major leagues after Kyle Gibson was designated for assignment, and subsequently made his major league debut. Strowd made 25 appearances for the Orioles during his rookie campaign, compiling an 0-1 record and 1.71 ERA with 24 strikeouts across 26 1/3 innings pitched.

=== Arizona Diamondbacks ===
On February 5, 2026, the Orioles traded Strowd, along with prospects Wellington Aracena and José Mejía, to the Arizona Diamondbacks in exchange for Blaze Alexander. Strowd was optioned to the Triple-A Reno Aces to begin the regular season.
