= Tommy Troy =

American baseball player (born 2002)

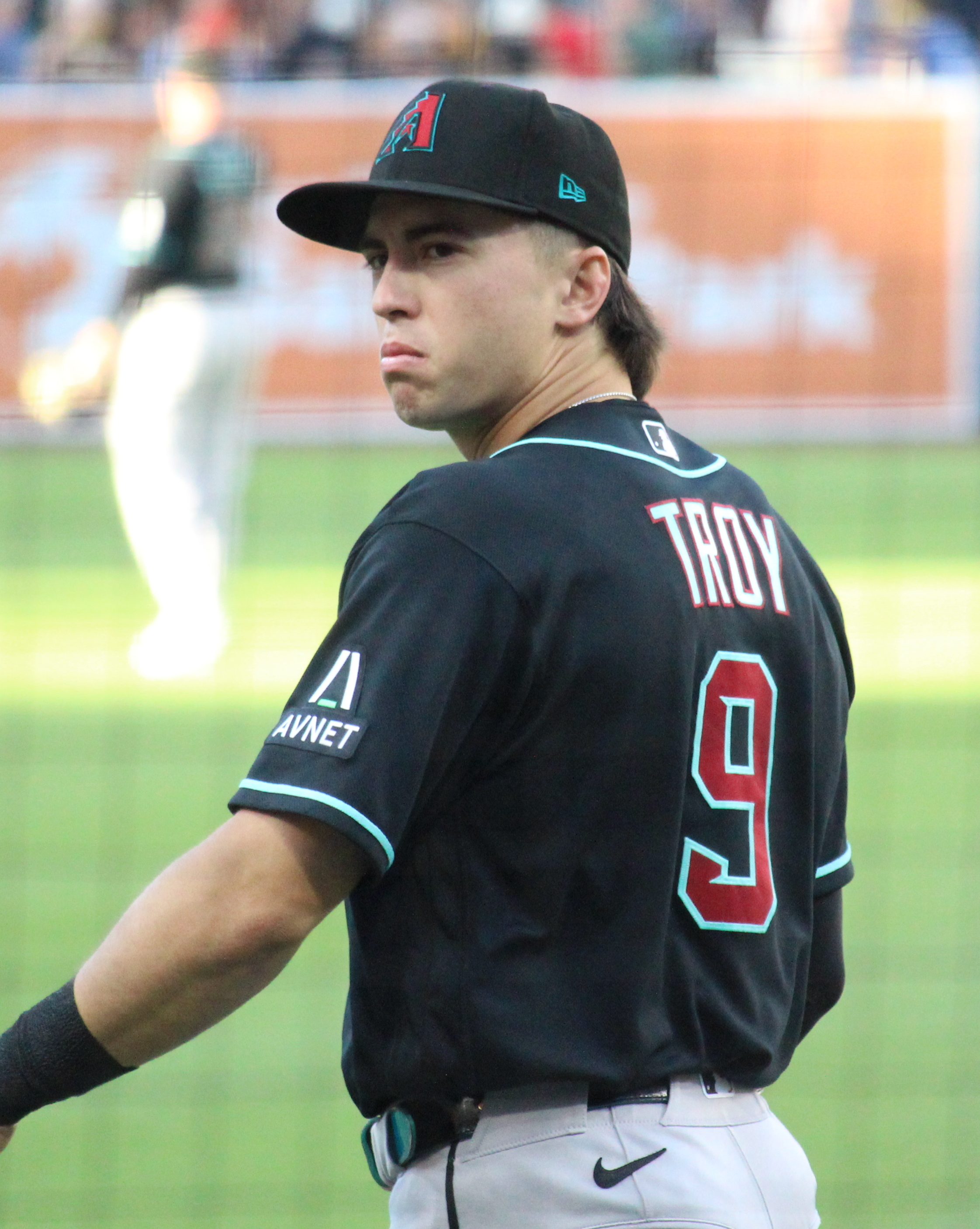
- Troy with the Arizona Diamondbacks in 2026

Arizona Diamondbacks – No. 9
- Outfielder / Second baseman
- Born: January 17, 2002 (age 24); San Jose, California, U.S.
- Bats: Right Throws: Right

MLB debut
- May 24, 2026, for the Arizona Diamondbacks

MLB statistics (through 2026 season)
- Batting average: .217
- Home runs: 4
- Runs batted in: 9
- Stats at Baseball Reference

Teams
- Arizona Diamondbacks (2026–present)

Thomas Joachim Troy V (born January 17, 2002) is an American professional baseball outfielder and second baseman for the Arizona Diamondbacks of Major League Baseball (MLB). He was selected by the Diamondbacks in the first round of the 2023 MLB draft and made his MLB debut in 2026.

== Amateur career ==
Troy attended Los Gatos High School in Los Gatos, California, where he played on their baseball team. He was ranked as a top 200 prospect for the 2020 Major League Baseball draft by Baseball America, but went unselected in the shortened draft and enrolled at Stanford University to play college baseball. He played in the Northwoods League with the Traverse City Pit Spitters that summer.

As a freshman at Stanford in 2021, Troy appeared in 49 games (making 39 starts) and batted .247 with ten home runs, 28 runs batted in (RBI), and six doubles. Following the season's end, he played in the Cape Cod Baseball League with the Wareham Gatemen, with whom he earned All-Star honors. As a sophomore at Stanford in 2022, he played in 55 games and hit .339 with seven home runs, 23 RBI, and 15 doubles. He returned to play in the Cape Cod Baseball League with the Cotuit Kettleers and was named an All-Star. After the season's end, he was awarded the Robert A. McNeese Outstanding Pro Prospect Award after batting .310 with five home runs and 20 RBI over thirty games. Troy entered the 2023 season as a top prospect for upcoming draft. Over 58 games for Stanford in 2023, he hit .394 with 17 home runs, 58 RBI, and 17 stolen bases.

== Professional career ==
The Arizona Diamondbacks selected Troy in the first round, with the 12th overall selection, of the 2023 Major League Baseball draft. On July 18, 2023, Troy signed with the Diamondbacks on a below slot deal worth $4.4 million.

Troy made his professional debut with the Arizona Complex League Diamondbacks and was promoted to the Hillsboro Hops after four games. Over 27 games played between both teams, Troy hit .271 with four home runs and 21 RBI. He was assigned back to Hillsboro to open the 2024 season. He missed over two months due to groin and hamstring injuries, and played seven games with the Complex League Diamondbacks on a rehab assignment before returning to Hillsboro. Over 72 games for the season, Troy batted .234 with five home runs, 25 RBI, and 16 stolen bases. After the season, he was assigned to the Salt River Rafters of the Arizona Fall League.

Troy was assigned to the Amarillo Sod Poodles to open the 2025 season. In early August, he was promoted to the Reno Aces. Troy played in 125 games between both teams and hit .289 with 15 home runs, 66 RBI, 24 stolen bases and 28 doubles. Troy was assigned to Reno to begin the 2026 season. Across 44 games with Reno to open the season, he hit .307 with three home runs, 28 RBI and ten doubles.

On May 23, 2026, the Diamondbacks selected Troy's contract to the 40-man roster and promoted him to the major leagues for the first time. He made his MLB debut the next day as Arizona's starting left fielder and went 2-for-4 with two doubles, with his first ever MLB hit coming off Colorado Rockies starter José Quintana. He hit his first MLB home run and recorded his first career RBI off Emmet Sheehan in a 4-1 victory over the Los Angeles Dodgers on June 1, finishing 2-for-3 in the game with two runs scored. On July 15, Troy was placed on the 10-day injured list with a sprained right acromioclavicular joint. He was activated and returned to the Diamondbacks on August 4. Troy was optioned to Reno on September 15, with whom he ended the season. With Arizona, Troy played in 45 games and ended the season with a .217 batting average, four home runs, and nine RBI.
