= Reno Aces =

- Founded in 2009; Reno, Nevada
Team logo
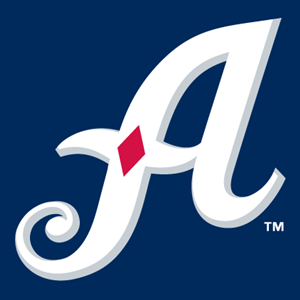
Cap insignia

Minor league affiliations
- Class: Triple-A (2009–present)
- League: Pacific Coast League (2009–present)
- Division: West Division

Major league affiliations
- Team: Arizona Diamondbacks (2009–present)

Minor league titles
- Class titles (1): 2012
- League titles (2): 2012; 2022
- Conference titles (2): 2012; 2014
- Division titles (5): 2011; 2012; 2014; 2017; 2022
- Second-half titles (1): 2024

Team data
- Name: Reno Aces (2009–present)
- Colors: Navy blue, white, red
- Mascot: Archie
- Ballpark: Greater Nevada Field (2009–present)
- Owner/ Operator: SK Baseball
- General manager: Chris Phillips
- Manager: Jeff Gardner
- Website: milb.com/reno

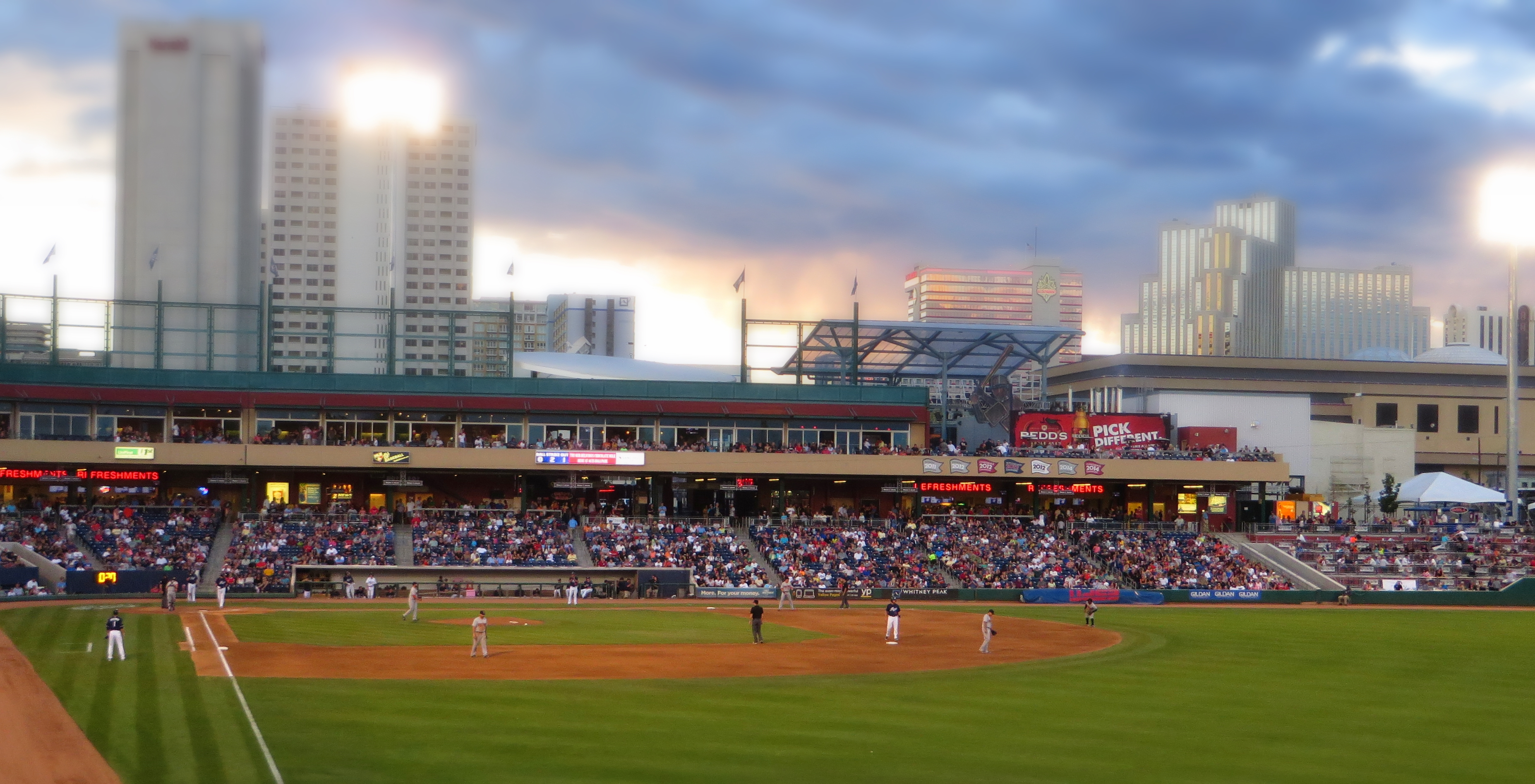
Greater Nevada Field

The Reno Aces are a Minor League Baseball team of the Pacific Coast League (PCL) and the Triple-A affiliate of the Arizona Diamondbacks. They are located in Reno, Nevada, and play their home games at Greater Nevada Field, which opened in 2009. The Aces have been members of the PCL since 2009, including the 2021 season in which it was known as the Triple-A West. They won the PCL championship in 2012 and 2022. Reno went on to win the Triple-A National Championship Game in 2012.

== History ==
=== Team origins ===
The Aces were known as the Tucson Sidewinders from 1998 to 2008. Before that, the team was first known as the Tucson Toros. They were Tucson's Triple-A baseball club, playing at Hi Corbett Field in midtown Tucson from 1969 to 1997. Part of the old ten-team configuration of the Pacific Coast League, the Toros won the PCL Championship in 1991 and 1993. The Toros were preceded by a number of other Tucson teams between 1915 and 1958, such as the Tucson Cowboys and the Tucson Lizards.

After the 1998 Major League Baseball expansion, which added the Arizona Diamondbacks in Phoenix and Tampa Bay Devil Rays, the Toros moved to Fresno, California, as the Fresno Grizzlies. The Phoenix Firebirds relocated to Tucson, briefly became the Tucson Toros (1997), and then became the Sidewinders (1998), the Triple-A affiliate of the new Diamondbacks. This was accomplished by what amounted to a swap in ownership in 1997, with Firebirds owner Martin Stone purchasing the Toros and Toros owner Rick Holtzman receiving interest in the Firebirds. The Tucson team retained management and staff primarily from the Toros, and traces its history from the Toros rather than the Firebirds.

The Sidewinders had humble beginnings, as it was five years before they enjoyed their first winning regular season. They dominated the 2006 season, with the PCL's best record in the regular season and won the Pacific Coast League and National Championships in the postseason.

The Phoenix Firebirds played from 1958 through 1997 as an affiliate of the San Francisco Giants. The franchise joined the Pacific Coast League as a charter member in 1903 as the San Francisco Seals, relocating to Phoenix in 1958 when the major league New York Giants moved to San Francisco. Seals alumni include Joe DiMaggio.

The Tucson Toros have been affiliated with the Chicago White Sox (1969–1972), the Oakland Athletics (1973–1976), the Texas Rangers (1977–1979), the Houston Astros (1980–1996), and the Milwaukee Brewers (1997 only, with one Diamondbacks prospect, Travis Lee, playing with them by special arrangement). At the time of the change in venue and affiliation (1998), the name Sidewinders was chosen from a contest.

The Toros became a member of the independent Golden Baseball League, adopting their previous Triple-A history from 1969 to 1997. The Aces adopted the Sidewinders' history from 1998 to 2008 before the franchise was moved to Reno. The Toros folded in 2011 after the AAA Portland Beavers moved to town to become the Tucson Padres. The Padres moved again in 2014, this time to Texas to become the El Paso Chihuahuas.

=== A new era – Reno Aces ===
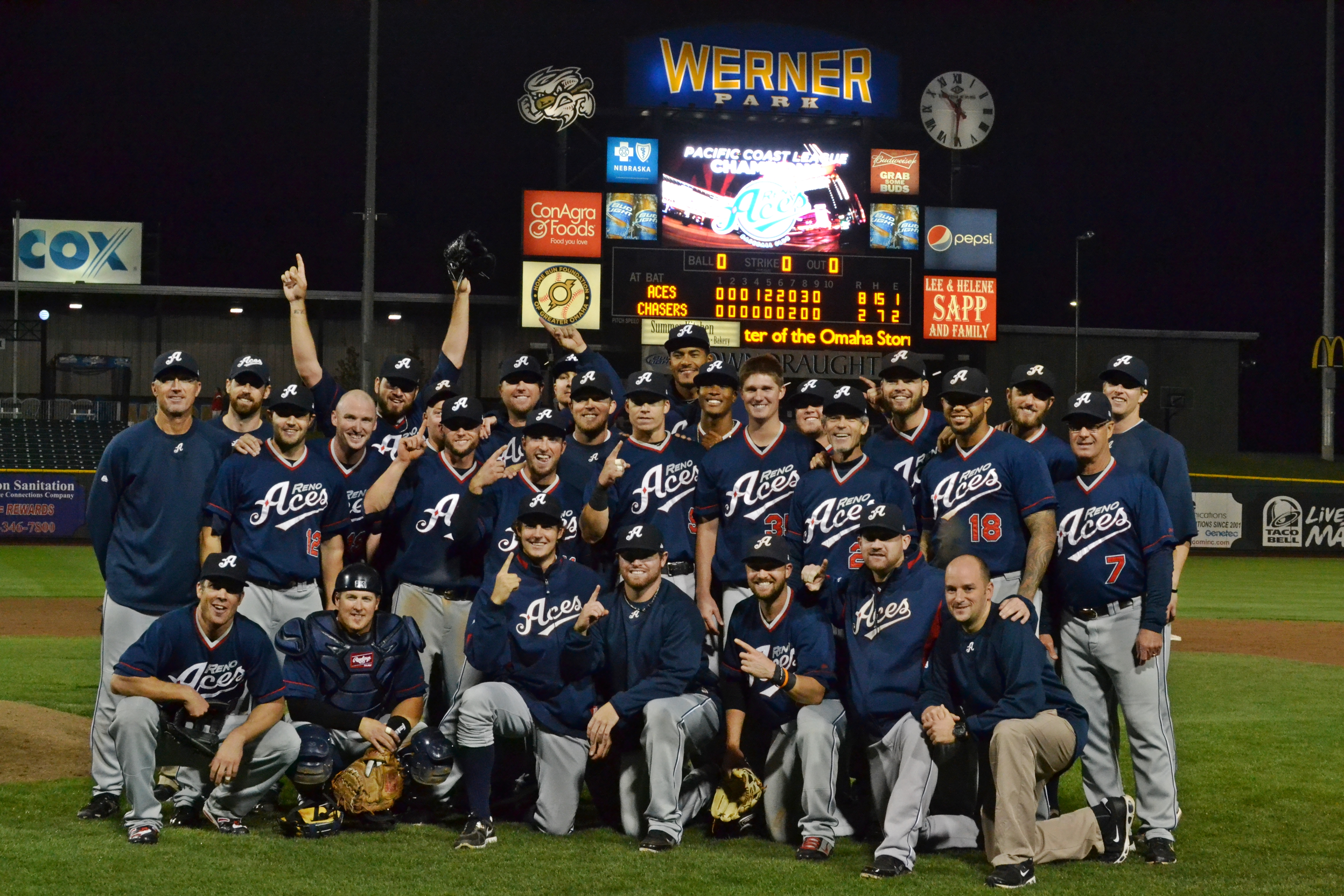
The 2012 PCL champion Aces

In 2006, the team was sold to Manhattan Capital Sports Fund led by Stuart Katzoff and Jerry Katzoff, later in 2007 it was formally announced that the Sidewinders would be moving to Reno after the 2008 season. A new 9,100-capacity venue, Greater Nevada Field, was constructed for the team in downtown Reno.

The move forced the Reno Silver Sox of the independent Golden Baseball League to fold. The franchise dropped the name "Sidewinders" in place of a new identity. Some fans suggested that the team should adopt or purchase the rights to the Silver Sox name from the GBL for the new PCL club, but that was ruled out as that team was, at that point (prior to folding), likely to relocate to Carson City. The Reno Aces introduced their new team name and logo at a press conference on September 23, 2008. The nickname has a dual meaning: "ace" is a baseball slang term for a team's top pitcher, and the ace is the highest card in several card games (a reference to Nevada's gambling history). The logo features the diamonds symbol, which can be seen as another gambling reference, as well as to the diamond of a baseball field and their MLB affiliate's name.

The Reno Aces were due to begin their inaugural season in 2009 on the road against the Salt Lake Bees on Thursday, April 9. However, the game was postponed due to the death of Los Angeles Angels' Nick Adenhart (a Salt Lake alumnus), who was killed by a hit-and-run driver earlier in the day. Adenhart had played for the Bees during the 2008 season, and was remembered the next day in what was originally the second game in a four-game series between the Aces and the Bees. The Bees beat the Aces 6–2 on Friday, April 10. The Aces won their home opener at Greater Nevada Field on Friday, April 17, 11–1 against the Salt Lake Bees, to an over-capacity sell-out crowd of 9,167.

The Aces made the playoffs for the first time in 2011, but lost the fifth and deciding game in the first round to the Sacramento River Cats. The Aces made it back to the post-season the following year in 2012, defeated Sacramento in five games, and the Omaha Storm Chasers in four to win the PCL title. Reno then won the Triple-A National Championship Game, defeating the Pawtucket Red Sox 10–3 at Durham Bulls Athletic Park in North Carolina.

The Reno Aces hosted the Triple-A All-Star Game on July 17, 2013.

In conjunction with Major League Baseball's restructuring of Minor League Baseball in 2021, the Aces were organized into the Triple-A West. Reno ended the season in second place in the Western Division with a 69–49 record. No playoffs were held to determine a league champion; instead, the team with the best regular-season record was declared the winner. However, 10 games that had been postponed from the start of the season were reinserted into the schedule as a postseason tournament called the Triple-A Final Stretch in which all 30 Triple-A clubs competed for the highest winning percentage. Reno finished the tournament in 28th place with a 1–5 record. In 2022, the Triple-A West became known as the Pacific Coast League, the name historically used by the regional circuit prior to the 2021 reorganization.

Manager Gil Velazquez led the 2022 Aces to win the Western Division title with a league-best 85–63 record. They then defeated the El Paso Chihuahuas, winners of the Eastern Division, in a single playoff game, 6–2, to win their second PCL championship. Reno faced the Durham Bulls for the Triple-A championship, but they were defeated, 10–6.

On April 27, 2023, the Aces defeated the Sugar Land Space Cowboys by a score of 24–2. The 22-run margin of victory marked the Aces' largest in a game in team history, and the 24 runs fell 1 run short of the club record. All nine offensive starters recorded a hit, with Dominic Fletcher, Buddy Kennedy, Phillip Evans, P. J. Higgins, Dominic Canzone, and Jake Hager enjoying multi-hit nights. The 2024 Aces won the second-half title, earning them a playoff berth, but they lost the PCL championship to Sugar Land, 2–0, in the best-of-three series.

== Season-by-season records ==
Key
League	The team's final position in the league standings
Division	The team's final position in the divisional standings
GB	Games behind the team that finished in first place in the division that season
‡	Class champions (2009–present)
†	League champions (2009–present)
§	Conference champions (2009–2020)
*	Division champions (2009–2022)
^	Postseason berth (1962–present)

Season-by-season records
Season	League	Regular-season					Postseason			MLB affiliate	Ref.
Season	League	Record	Win %	League	Division	GB	Record	Win %	Result	MLB affiliate	Ref.
2009	PCL	79–64	.552	3rd	2nd	7	—	—	Result	—	Arizona Diamondbacks
2010	PCL	69–74	.483	11th	3rd	9 1/2	—	—	—	Arizona Diamondbacks	
2011 *	PCL	77–67	.535	5th	1st	—	2–3	.400	Won Pacific Conference Northern Division title Lost Pacific Conference title vs. Sacramento River Cats, 3–2	Arizona Diamondbacks	
2012 * § † ‡	PCL	81–63	.563	3rd	1st	—	7–3	.700	Won Pacific Conference Northern Division title Won Pacific Conference title vs. Sacramento River Cats, 3–2; Won PCL championship vs. Omaha Storm Chasers, 3–1; Won Triple-A championship vs. Pawtucket Red Sox	Arizona Diamondbacks	
2013	PCL	60–84	.417	15th	4th	18	—	—	—	Arizona Diamondbacks	
2014 * §	PCL	81–63	.563	1st (tie)	1st	—	5–4	.556	Won Pacific Conference Northern Division title Won Pacific Conference title vs. Las Vegas 51s, 3–1; Lost PCL championship vs. Omaha Storm Chasers, 3–2	Arizona Diamondbacks	
2015	PCL	70–74	.486	10th	3rd	14 1/2	—	—	—	Arizona Diamondbacks	
2016	PCL	76–68	.528	4th	2nd	5 1/2	—	—	—	Arizona Diamondbacks	
2017 *	PCL	80–62	.563	3rd	1st	—	0–3	.000	Won Pacific Conference Northern Division title Lost Pacific Conference title vs. El Paso Chihuahuas, 3–0	Arizona Diamondbacks	
2018	PCL	72–68	.514	6th (tie)	2nd	10 1/2	—	—	—	Arizona Diamondbacks	
2019	PCL	66–74	.471	10th	2nd	7	—	—	—	Arizona Diamondbacks	
2020	PCL	Season cancelled (COVID-19 pandemic)								Arizona Diamondbacks	
2021	AAAW	70–54 (Note: In 2021, the team with the best record at the end of the regular-season was declared the Triple-A West champion. Reno had a 69–49 (.585) record, 3 games behind first place, which put them 3rd in the league and 2nd in their division. The regular-season was followed by the Triple-A Final Stretch, a 10-game postseason tournament in which all 30 Triple-A clubs competed for the highest winning percentage. Reno finished the tournament in for 28th place with a 1–5 (.167) record.)	.565	3rd	2nd	5	—	—	—	Arizona Diamondbacks	
2022 * †	PCL	85–63	.574	1st	1st	—	1–1	.500	Won Western Division title Won PCL championship vs. El Paso Chihuahuas, 1–0; Lost Triple-A championship vs. Durham Bulls, 1–0	Arizona Diamondbacks	
2023	PCL	88–62	.587	3rd	1st	—	—	—	—	Arizona Diamondbacks	
2024^	PCL	79–70	.530	4th	3rd	2 1/2	0–2	.000	Won second-half title Lost PCL championship vs. Sugar Land Space Cowboys, 2–0	Arizona Diamondbacks	
2025	PCL	63–87	.420	9th	5th	23	—	—	—	Arizona Diamondbacks	
2026	PCL	67–82	.450	9th	5th	20 1/2	—	—	—	Arizona Diamondbacks	
Totals	—	1,263–1,197	.513	—	—	—	15–16	.484	—	—	—

== Roster ==
Reno Aces roster
Players	Coaches/Other
Pitchers: 61 Casey Anderson ~; 41 Jonatan Bernal; 38 Mitch Bratt *; 23 Juan Burgos *; 50 Corbin Burnes #*; 53 Jose Cabrera *; 49 Isaiah Campbell; 8 Gerardo Carrillo *; 40 Kohl Drake *; 17 Zac Gallen #*; 37 Spencer Giesting; 47 Tommy Henry; 57 Ashton Izzi; 20 Drey Jameson *; 27 Bryce Jarvis; 38 Derek Law *; 18 Yu-Min Lin ~; 31 Ryne Nelson #*; 39 Dylan Ray *; 32 Avery Short ~; 54 Landon Sims; 34 Kade Strowd *; 48 Blake Walston *; Catchers: 13 Christian Cerda; 35 Aramis Garcia *; 36 Matt O'Neill; Infielders: 10 Gavin Conticello; 28 Demetrio Crisantes; 16 Santiago Espinal *; 11 Logan Mercado; 6 LuJames Groover *; 24 Manuel Peña; 3 Anderdson Rojas; 29 Luis Urías; 4 Jesús Valdez ~; Outfielders: 59 Kristian Robinson; 7 Tommy Troy *; 33 A. J. Vukovich; 21 Trent Youngblood; Designated hitters: 25 Adrian Del Castillo *	Manager: 12 Jeff Gardner; Coaches: 55 Jeff Bajenaru (pitching); 51 Doug Drabek (pitching); 25 Josue Perez (hitting); 60 Jordan Procyshen (coach); 44 Shawn Roof (bench); 43 Terrmel Sledge (hitting); 60-day injured list: -- Kyle Amendt; 56 Andrew Hoffmann *; 7-day injured list; * On Arizona Diamondbacks 40-man roster; ~ Development list; # Rehab assignment; ∞ Reserve list; ‡ Restricted list; § Suspended list; † Temporarily inactive list; Roster updated September 18, 2026; Transactions; → More rosters: MiLB • Pacific Coast League; → Arizona Diamondbacks minor league players

== Notable alumni ==
- Trevor Bauer, pitcher
- Corbin Carroll, outfielder
- Patrick Corbin, pitcher
- Adam Eaton, outfielder
- Mitch Haniger, outfielder
- Ender Inciarte, outfielder
- Jake Lamb, third baseman
- Wade Miley, pitcher
- Chris Owings, shortstop, 2nd baseman
- A. J. Pollock, outfielder
- Brett Butler, manager

== Minor league affiliations ==
Level	Team	League	Location	Manager
Triple-A	Reno Aces	Pacific Coast League	Reno, Nevada	Blake Lalli
Double-A	Amarillo Sod Poodles	Texas League	Amarillo, Texas	Shawn Roof
High-A	Hillsboro Hops	Northwest League	Hillsboro, Oregon	Vince Harrison
Low-A	Visalia Rawhide	California League	Visalia, California	Javier Colina
Rookie	AZL D-backs	Arizona League	Scottsdale, Arizona	Rolando Arnedo
Rookie	DSL D-backs 1	Dominican Summer League	Boca Chica, Santo Domingo	Jaime Del Valle
Rookie	DSL D-backs 2	Dominican Summer League	Boca Chica, Santo Domingo	Ronald Ramirez

== See also ==
- Current and former Reno Aces players (2009–present)
