= 2027 Los Angeles Dodgers season =

Season for the Major League Baseball team the Los Angeles Dodgers

2027 Los Angeles Dodgers
- League: National League
- Division: West
- Ballpark: Uniqlo Field at Dodger Stadium
- City: Los Angeles, California
- Owner: Guggenheim Baseball Management
- President: Stan Kasten
- President of baseball operations: Andrew Friedman
- General manager: Brandon Gomes
- Manager: Dave Roberts
- Television: Spectrum SportsNet LA (Joe Davis, Stephen Nelson, Orel Hershiser, Eric Karros, Jessica Mendoza, Dontrelle Willis, Rick Monday, Kirsten Watson, David Vassegh)
- Radio: KLAC-AM; Los Angeles Dodgers Radio Network (Charley Steiner, Tim Neverett, Stephen Nelson, Rick Monday, José Mota); KTNQ (Pepe Yñiguez, José Mota, Luis Cruz)

The 2027 Los Angeles Dodgers season is scheduled to be the 138th season for the Los Angeles Dodgers franchise in Major League Baseball (MLB), their 70th season in Los Angeles, California, and their 66th season playing home games at Dodger Stadium. The Dodgers would seek to make their fifteenth straight playoff appearance, which would surpass the 1991–2005 Atlanta Braves as the longest consecutive postseason streak in MLB history. They would also attempt to secure their sixth straight National League West title and make a return to the World Series after a one-year absence.

The season is contingent on Major League Baseball (MLB) and the Major League Baseball Players Association (MLBPA) signing a new collective bargaining agreement (CBA). Without a new CBA, MLB is expected to lock out the players on December 2, 2026, until one is signed. If such a lockout extends indefinitely, the season could be postponed, shortened, or even cancelled.

== Offseason ==
=== Coaching staff ===
Hitting coach Aaron Bates resigned from his position with the Dodgers after the 2026 when he was unable to come to agreement with the Dodgers on a new contract. On November 10, the team hired Pedro Guerrero to replace him.

=== Roster departures ===
On October 29, 2026, the day after the conclusion of the 2026 World Series, nine Dodgers players became free agents. This included left-handed pitchers Tarik Skubal, Alex Vesia, Kris Bubic, and Eric Lauer; right-handed pitchers Evan Phillips, Blake Treinen, and Brusdar Graterol; and utility players Miguel Rojas and Kiké Hernández. Rojas, who initially announced his intention to retire at the end of the previous season, confirmed his retirement on October 15. Pitcher Jake Cousins was designated for assignment on November 17.

=== Roster additions ===
On November 9, the Dodgers claimed utility player Christian Cairo off waivers from the New York Mets. However, Cairo was promptly designated for assignment on November 17 when the team added four minor league pitchers to the 40-man roster: Luke Fox, Jackson Ferris, Adam Serwinowski, and Christian Zazueta. On November 20, the Dodgers acquired infielder Royce Lewis from the Minnesota Twins in exchange for pitcher Bobby Miller and minor league catcher Francisco Espinoza.

Off-season 40-man roster moves

| Departing player | Date | Transaction | New team | Arriving player | Old team | Date | Transaction |
|---|---|---|---|---|---|---|---|
| Kris Bubic | October 29 | Free agent | TBA | Christian Cairo | New York Mets | November 9 | Waiver claim |
| Brusdar Graterol | October 29 | Free agent | TBA | Jackson Ferris | Oklahoma City Comets | November 17 | Added to 40-man roster |
| Kiké Hernández | October 29 | Free agent | TBA | Luke Fox | Tulsa Drillers | November 17 | Added to 40-man roster |
| Eric Lauer | October 29 | Free agent | TBA | Adam Serwinowski | Tulsa Drillers | November 17 | Added to 40-man roster |
| Evan Phillips | October 29 | Free agent | Atlanta Braves | Christian Zazueta | Tulsa Drillers | November 17 | Added to 40-man roster |
| Tarik Skubal | October 29 | Free agent | TBA | Royce Lewis | Minnesota Twins | November 20 | Trade |
| Blake Treinen | October 29 | Free agent | TBA | | | | |
| Alex Vesia | October 29 | Free agent | TBA | | | | |
| Miguel Rojas | October 29 | Retired | N/A | | | | |
| Christian Cairo | November 17 | Designated for assignment | Toronto Blue Jays | | | | |
| Jake Cousins | November 17 | Designated for assignment | TBA | | | | |
| Bobby Miller | November 20 | Trade | Minnesota Twins | | | | |

== Regular season ==
=== Game log ===
The 2027 schedule is tentative until a new collective bargaining agreement (CBA) is signed between Major League Baseball (MLB) and the Major League Baseball Players Association (MLBPA). If the labor dispute extends into late February or early March, MLB would then start to consider whether to postpone or shorten the season.

Legend
| | Dodgers win |
| | Dodgers loss |
| | Postponement |
| **Bold** | Dodgers team member |

2027 Game Log: 0–0 (Home: 0–0; Road: 0–0)
March/April: 0–0 (Home: 0–0; Road: 0–0)

| # | Date | Opponent | Score | Win | Loss | Save | Attendance | Record |
|---|---|---|---|---|---|---|---|---|
| 1 | March 25 | Braves | — | — | — | — | — | 0–0 |
| 2 | March 27 | Braves | — | — | — | — | — | 0–0 |
| 3 | March 28 | Braves | — | — | — | — | — | 0–0 |
| 4 | March 29 | Twins | — | — | — | — | — | 0–0 |
| 5 | March 30 | Twins | — | — | — | — | — | 0–0 |
| 6 | March 31 | Twins | — | — | — | — | — | 0–0 |
| 7 | April 1 | @ Rockies | — | — | — | — | — | 0–0 |
| 8 | April 2 | @ Rockies | — | — | — | — | — | 0–0 |
| 9 | April 3 | @ Rockies | — | — | — | — | — | 0–0 |
| 10 | April 4 | @ Rockies | — | — | — | — | — | 0–0 |
| 11 | April 5 | @ Diamondbacks | — | — | — | — | — | 0–0 |
| 12 | April 6 | @ Diamondbacks | — | — | — | — | — | 0–0 |
| 13 | April 7 | @ Diamondbacks | — | — | — | — | — | 0–0 |
| 14 | April 9 | @ Padres | — | — | — | — | — | 0–0 |
| 15 | April 10 | @ Padres | — | — | — | — | — | 0–0 |
| 16 | April 11 | @ Padres | — | — | — | — | — | 0–0 |
| 17 | April 13 | Rockies | — | — | — | — | — | 0–0 |
| 18 | April 14 | Rockies | — | — | — | — | — | 0–0 |
| 19 | April 15 | Rockies | — | — | — | — | — | 0–0 |
| 20 | April 16 | Cubs | — | — | — | — | — | 0–0 |
| 21 | April 17 | Cubs | — | — | — | — | — | 0–0 |
| 22 | April 18 | Cubs | — | — | — | — | — | 0–0 |
| 23 | April 20 | @ Phillies | — | — | — | — | — | 0–0 |
| 24 | April 21 | @ Phillies | — | — | — | — | — | 0–0 |
| 25 | April 22 | @ Phillies | — | — | — | — | — | 0–0 |
| 26 | April 23 | @ Nationals | — | — | — | — | — | 0–0 |
| 27 | April 24 | @ Nationals | — | — | — | — | — | 0–0 |
| 28 | April 25 | @ Nationals | — | — | — | — | — | 0–0 |
| 29 | April 26 | White Sox | — | — | — | — | — | 0–0 |
| 30 | April 27 | White Sox | — | — | — | — | — | 0–0 |
| 31 | April 28 | White Sox | — | — | — | — | — | 0–0 |
| 32 | April 30 | Tigers | — | — | — | — | — | 0–0 |

May: 0–0 (Home: 0–0; Road: 0–0)

| # | Date | Opponent | Score | Win | Loss | Save | Attendance | Record |
|---|---|---|---|---|---|---|---|---|
| 33 | May 1 | Tigers | — | — | — | — | — | 0–0 |
| 34 | May 2 | Tigers | — | — | — | — | — | 0–0 |
| 35 | May 3 | @ Mariners | — | — | — | — | — | 0–0 |
| 36 | May 4 | @ Mariners | — | — | — | — | — | 0–0 |
| 37 | May 5 | @ Mariners | — | — | — | — | — | 0–0 |
| 38 | May 6 | Giants | — | — | — | — | — | 0–0 |
| 39 | May 7 | Giants | — | — | — | — | — | 0–0 |
| 40 | May 8 | Giants | — | — | — | — | — | 0–0 |
| 41 | May 9 | Giants | — | — | — | — | — | 0–0 |
| 42 | May 11 | @ Guardians | — | — | — | — | — | 0–0 |
| 43 | May 12 | @ Guardians | — | — | — | — | — | 0–0 |
| 44 | May 13 | @ Guardians | — | — | — | — | — | 0–0 |
| 45 | May 14 | @ Red Sox | — | — | — | — | — | 0–0 |
| 46 | May 15 | @ Red Sox | — | — | — | — | — | 0–0 |
| 47 | May 16 | @ Red Sox | — | — | — | — | — | 0–0 |
| 48 | May 17 | Reds | — | — | — | — | — | 0–0 |
| 49 | May 18 | Reds | — | — | — | — | — | 0–0 |
| 50 | May 19 | Reds | — | — | — | — | — | 0–0 |
| 51 | May 21 | Padres | — | — | — | — | — | 0–0 |
| 52 | May 22 | Padres | — | — | — | — | — | 0–0 |
| 53 | May 23 | Padres | — | — | — | — | — | 0–0 |
| 54 | May 24 | Diamondbacks | — | — | — | — | — | 0–0 |
| 55 | May 25 | Diamondbacks | — | — | — | — | — | 0–0 |
| 56 | May 26 | Diamondbacks | — | — | — | — | — | 0–0 |
| 57 | May 28 | @ Angels | — | — | — | — | — | 0–0 |
| 58 | May 29 | @ Angels | — | — | — | — | — | 0–0 |
| 59 | May 30 | @ Angels | — | — | — | — | — | 0–0 |
| 60 | May 31 | @ Brewers | — | — | — | — | — | 0–0 |

June: 0–0 (Home: 0–0; Road: 0–0)

| # | Date | Opponent | Score | Win | Loss | Save | Attendance | Record |
|---|---|---|---|---|---|---|---|---|
| 61 | June 1 | @ Brewers | — | — | — | — | — | 0–0 |
| 62 | June 2 | @ Brewers | — | — | — | — | — | 0–0 |
| 63 | June 3 | @ Cubs | — | — | — | — | — | 0–0 |
| 64 | June 4 | @ Cubs | — | — | — | — | — | 0–0 |
| 65 | June 5 | @ Cubs | — | — | — | — | — | 0–0 |
| 66 | June 6 | @ Cubs | — | — | — | — | — | 0–0 |
| 67 | June 7 | Brewers | — | — | — | — | — | 0–0 |
| 68 | June 8 | Brewers | — | — | — | — | — | 0–0 |
| 69 | June 9 | Brewers | — | — | — | — | — | 0–0 |
| 70 | June 11 | Pirates | — | — | — | — | — | 0–0 |
| 71 | June 12 | Pirates | — | — | — | — | — | 0–0 |
| 72 | June 13 | Pirates | — | — | — | — | — | 0–0 |
| 73 | June 14 | @ Giants | — | — | — | — | — | 0–0 |
| 74 | June 15 | @ Giants | — | — | — | — | — | 0–0 |
| 75 | June 16 | @ Giants | — | — | — | — | — | 0–0 |
| 76 | June 18 | Marlins | — | — | — | — | — | 0–0 |
| 77 | June 19 | Marlins | — | — | — | — | — | 0–0 |
| 78 | June 20 | Marlins | — | — | — | — | — | 0–0 |
| 79 | June 22 | @ Rays | — | — | — | — | — | 0–0 |
| 80 | June 23 | @ Rays | — | — | — | — | — | 0–0 |
| 81 | June 24 | @ Rays | — | — | — | — | — | 0–0 |
| 82 | June 25 | @ Marlins | — | — | — | — | — | 0–0 |
| 83 | June 26 | @ Marlins | — | — | — | — | — | 0–0 |
| 84 | June 27 | @ Marlins | — | — | — | — | — | 0–0 |
| 85 | June 28 | Nationals | — | — | — | — | — | 0–0 |
| 86 | June 29 | Nationals | — | — | — | — | — | 0–0 |
| 87 | June 30 | Nationals | — | — | — | — | — | 0–0 |

July: 0–0 (Home: 0–0; Road: 0–0)

| # | Date | Opponent | Score | Win | Loss | Save | Attendance | Record |
|---|---|---|---|---|---|---|---|---|
| 88 | July 1 | Mets | — | — | — | — | — | 0–0 |
| 89 | July 2 | Mets | — | — | — | — | — | 0–0 |
| 90 | July 3 | Mets | — | — | — | — | — | 0–0 |
| 91 | July 4 | Mets | — | — | — | — | — | 0–0 |
| 92 | July 6 | @ Pirates | — | — | — | — | — | 0–0 |
| 93 | July 7 | @ Pirates | — | — | — | — | — | 0–0 |
| 94 | July 8 | @ Pirates | — | — | — | — | — | 0–0 |
| 95 | July 9 | @ Mets | — | — | — | — | — | 0–0 |
| 96 | July 10 | @ Mets | — | — | — | — | — | 0–0 |
| 97 | July 11 | @ Mets | — | — | — | — | — | 0–0 |
| – | July 13 | 97th All-Star Game | American League vs. National League (Wrigley Field, Chicago, Illinois) | | | | | |
| 98 | July 16 | Angels | — | — | — | — | — | 0–0 |
| 99 | July 17 | Angels | — | — | — | — | — | 0–0 |
| 100 | July 18 | Angels | — | — | — | — | — | 0–0 |
| 101 | July 19 | Athletics | — | — | — | — | — | 0–0 |
| 102 | July 20 | Athletics | — | — | — | — | — | 0–0 |
| 103 | July 21 | Athletics | — | — | — | — | — | 0–0 |
| 104 | July 23 | @ Cardinals | — | — | — | — | — | 0–0 |
| 105 | July 24 | @ Cardinals | — | — | — | — | — | 0–0 |
| 106 | July 25 | @ Cardinals | — | — | — | — | — | 0–0 |
| 107 | July 26 | @ Padres | — | — | — | — | — | 0–0 |
| 108 | July 27 | @ Padres | — | — | — | — | — | 0–0 |
| 109 | July 28 | @ Padres | — | — | — | — | — | 0–0 |
| 110 | July 29 | @ Padres | — | — | — | — | — | 0–0 |
| 111 | July 30 | Giants | — | — | — | — | — | 0–0 |
| 112 | July 31 | Giants | — | — | — | — | — | 0–0 |

August: 0–0 (Home: 0–0; Road: 0–0)

| # | Date | Opponent | Score | Win | Loss | Save | Attendance | Record |
|---|---|---|---|---|---|---|---|---|
| 113 | August 1 | Giants | — | — | — | — | — | 0–0 |
| 114 | August 3 | Astros | — | — | — | — | — | 0–0 |
| 115 | August 4 | Astros | — | — | — | — | — | 0–0 |
| 116 | August 5 | Astros | — | — | — | — | — | 0–0 |
| 117 | August 6 | @ Giants | — | — | — | — | — | 0–0 |
| 118 | August 7 | @ Giants | — | — | — | — | — | 0–0 |
| 119 | August 8 | @ Giants | — | — | — | — | — | 0–0 |
| 120 | August 9 | @ Rangers | — | — | — | — | — | 0–0 |
| 121 | August 10 | @ Rangers | — | — | — | — | — | 0–0 |
| 122 | August 11 | @ Rangers | — | — | — | — | — | 0–0 |
| 123 | August 13 | Phillies | — | — | — | — | — | 0–0 |
| 124 | August 14 | Phillies | — | — | — | — | — | 0–0 |
| 125 | August 15 | Phillies | — | — | — | — | — | 0–0 |
| 126 | August 16 | Rockies | — | — | — | — | — | 0–0 |
| 127 | August 17 | Rockies | — | — | — | — | — | 0–0 |
| 128 | August 18 | Rockies | — | — | — | — | — | 0–0 |
| 129 | August 20 | @ Orioles | — | — | — | — | — | 0–0 |
| 130 | August 21 | @ Orioles | — | — | — | — | — | 0–0 |
| 131 | August 22 | @ Orioles | — | — | — | — | — | 0–0 |
| 132 | August 23 | @ Reds | — | — | — | — | — | 0–0 |
| 133 | August 24 | @ Reds | — | — | — | — | — | 0–0 |
| 134 | August 25 | @ Reds | — | — | — | — | — | 0–0 |
| 135 | August 27 | Yankees | — | — | — | — | — | 0–0 |
| 136 | August 28 | Yankees | — | — | — | — | — | 0–0 |
| 137 | August 29 | Yankees | — | — | — | — | — | 0–0 |
| 138 | August 30 | Cardinals | — | — | — | — | — | 0–0 |
| 139 | August 31 | Cardinals | — | — | — | — | — | 0–0 |

September: 0–0 (Home: 0–0; Road: 0–0)

| # | Date | Opponent | Score | Win | Loss | Save | Attendance | Record |
|---|---|---|---|---|---|---|---|---|
| 140 | September 1 | Cardinals | — | — | — | — | — | 0–0 |
| 141 | September 3 | @ Royals | — | — | — | — | — | 0–0 |
| 142 | September 4 | @ Royals | — | — | — | — | — | 0–0 |
| 143 | September 5 | @ Royals | — | — | — | — | — | 0–0 |
| 144 | September 6 | @ Braves | — | — | — | — | — | 0–0 |
| 145 | September 7 | @ Braves | — | — | — | — | — | 0–0 |
| 146 | September 8 | @ Braves | — | — | — | — | — | 0–0 |
| 147 | September 10 | Padres | — | — | — | — | — | 0–0 |
| 148 | September 11 | Padres | — | — | — | — | — | 0–0 |
| 149 | September 12 | Padres | — | — | — | — | — | 0–0 |
| 150 | September 13 | Blue Jays | — | — | — | — | — | 0–0 |
| 151 | September 14 | Blue Jays | — | — | — | — | — | 0–0 |
| 152 | September 15 | Blue Jays | — | — | — | — | — | 0–0 |
| 153 | September 16 | Diamondbacks | — | — | — | — | — | 0–0 |
| 154 | September 17 | Diamondbacks | — | — | — | — | — | 0–0 |
| 155 | September 18 | Diamondbacks | — | — | — | — | — | 0–0 |
| 156 | September 19 | Diamondbacks | — | — | — | — | — | 0–0 |
| 157 | September 21 | @ Rockies | — | — | — | — | — | 0–0 |
| 158 | September 22 | @ Rockies | — | — | — | — | — | 0–0 |
| 159 | September 23 | @ Rockies | — | — | — | — | — | 0–0 |
| 160 | September 24 | @ Diamondbacks | — | — | — | — | — | 0–0 |
| 161 | September 25 | @ Diamondbacks | — | — | — | — | — | 0–0 |
| 162 | September 26 | @ Diamondbacks | — | — | — | — | — | 0–0 |

== Current roster ==
Los Angeles Dodgers 2027 spring training roster
| 40-man roster | | Non-roster invitees | Coaches / other |
|---|---|---|---|
| Pitchers: 78 Ben Casparius; 3 Edwin Díaz; 86 Jack Dreyer; -- Jackson Ferris; -- Luke Fox; 65 Paul Gervase; 31 Tyler Glasnow; 56 Seth Halvorsen; 60 Edgardo Henriquez; 63 Kyle Hurt; 61 Will Klein; 96 Landon Knack; 83 Ronan Kopp; 11 Roki Sasaki; 66 Tanner Scott; -- Adam Serwinowski; 80 Emmet Sheehan; 7 Blake Snell; 41 Brock Stewart; 35 Gavin Stone; 70 Justin Wrobleski; 18 Yoshinobu Yamamoto; -- Christian Zazueta; Two-way players: 17 Shohei Ohtani | Catchers: 64 Eliézer Alfonzo Jr.; 46 Hunter Feduccia; 68 Dalton Rushing; 16 Will Smith; Infielders: 50 Mookie Betts; 25 Tommy Edman; 76 Alex Freeland; 5 Freddie Freeman; 6 Hyeseong Kim; -- Royce Lewis; 13 Max Muncy; Outfielders: 12 Alex Call; 37 Teoscar Hernández; 44 Andy Pages; 23 Kyle Tucker; Designated hitters: 95 Josue De Paula | | Manager: 30 Dave Roberts; Coaches: 54 Josh Bard (bullpen); 91 Dino Ebel (third base); 88 Bob Geren (field coordinator); -- Pedro Guerrero (hitting); 0 Danny Lehmann (bench); 87 Connor McGuiness (assistant pitching); 99 Mark Prior (pitching); 72 Robert Van Scoyoc (hitting); 84 Chris Woodward (first base); 40 active, 0 inactive, 0 non-roster invitees; 7-, 10-, or 15-day injured list; * Not on active roster; ^{†} Suspended list; Roster, coaches, and NRIs updated November 20, 2026; Transactions • Depth chart; → All MLB rosters |

== Farm system ==
| Level | Team | League | Manager | W | L | Position |
|---|---|---|---|---|---|---|
| AAA | Oklahoma City Comets | Pacific Coast League (East Division) | | | | |
| AA | Tulsa Drillers | Texas League (North Division) | | | | |
| High A | Great Lakes Loons | Midwest League (East Division) | | | | |
| Low A | Ontario Tower Buzzers | California League (South Division) | | | | |
| Rookie | ACL Dodgers | Arizona Complex League (West Division) | | | | |
| Foreign Rookie | DSL Dodgers Bautista | Dominican Summer League (Northwest Division) | | | | |
| Foreign Rookie | DSL Dodgers Mega | Dominican Summer League (Northwest Division) | | | | |
