= 2027 Philadelphia Phillies season =

Major League Baseball season

2027 Philadelphia Phillies
- League: National League
- Division: East
- Ballpark: Citizens Bank Park
- City: Philadelphia
- Owner: John Middleton
- President of baseball operations: Dave Dombrowski
- General managers: Preston Mattingly
- Managers: Don Mattingly
- Television: NBC Sports Philadelphia; NBC Sports Philadelphia + NBC Philadelphia (TBA)
- Radio: Phillies Radio Network; WIP SportsRadio 94.1 FM (English) (TBA)
- Stats: ESPN.com; Baseball Reference

The 2027 Philadelphia Phillies season is scheduled to be the 145th season in the history of the franchise, and its 24th season at Citizens Bank Park.

The season is contingent on Major League Baseball (MLB) and the Major League Baseball Players Association (MLBPA) signing a new collective bargaining agreement (CBA). Without a new CBA, MLB is expected to lock out the players on December 2, 2026, until one is signed. If such a lockout extends indefinitely, the season could be postponed, shortened, or even cancelled.

== Game log ==
The 2027 schedule is tentative until a new collective bargaining agreement (CBA) is signed between Major League Baseball (MLB) and the Major League Baseball Players Association (MLBPA). If the labor dispute extends into late February or early March, MLB would then start to consider whether to postpone or shorten the season.

=== Regular season ===
Legend
| | Phillies win |
| | Phillies loss |
| | Postponement |
| **Bold** | Phillies team member |

2027 Game Log: 0–0 (Home: 0–0; Road: 0–0)
March/April: 0–0 (Home: 0–0; Road: 0–0)

| # | Date | Opponent | Score | Win | Loss | Save | Attendance | Record |
|---|---|---|---|---|---|---|---|---|
| 1 | March 25 | @ Nationals | — | — | — | — | — | 0–0 |
| 2 | March 27 | @ Nationals | — | — | — | — | — | 0–0 |
| 3 | March 28 | @ Nationals | — | — | — | — | — | 0–0 |
| 4 | March 29 | @ Marlins | — | — | — | — | — | 0–0 |
| 5 | March 30 | @ Marlins | — | — | — | — | — | 0–0 |
| 6 | March 31 | @ Marlins | — | — | — | — | — | 0–0 |
| 7 | April 1 | Nationals | — | — | — | — | — | 0–0 |
| 8 | April 2 | Nationals | — | — | — | — | — | 0–0 |
| 9 | April 3 | Nationals | — | — | — | — | — | 0–0 |
| 10 | April 4 | Nationals | — | — | — | — | — | 0–0 |
| 11 | April 6 | Tigers | — | — | — | — | — | 0–0 |
| 12 | April 7 | Tigers | — | — | — | — | — | 0–0 |
| 13 | April 8 | Tigers | — | — | — | — | — | 0–0 |
| 14 | April 9 | @ Brewers | — | — | — | — | — | 0–0 |
| 15 | April 10 | @ Brewers | — | — | — | — | — | 0–0 |
| 16 | April 11 | @ Brewers | — | — | — | — | — | 0–0 |
| 17 | April 13 | @ Cubs | — | — | — | — | — | 0–0 |
| 18 | April 14 | @ Cubs | — | — | — | — | — | 0–0 |
| 19 | April 15 | @ Cubs | — | — | — | — | — | 0–0 |
| 20 | April 16 | Brewers | — | — | — | — | — | 0–0 |
| 21 | April 17 | Brewers | — | — | — | — | — | 0–0 |
| 22 | April 18 | Brewers | — | — | — | — | — | 0–0 |
| 23 | April 20 | Dodgers | — | — | — | — | — | 0–0 |
| 24 | April 21 | Dodgers | — | — | — | — | — | 0–0 |
| 25 | April 22 | Dodgers | — | — | — | — | — | 0–0 |
| 26 | April 23 | Diamondbacks | — | — | — | — | — | 0–0 |
| 27 | April 24 | Diamondbacks | — | — | — | — | — | 0–0 |
| 28 | April 25 | Diamondbacks | — | — | — | — | — | 0–0 |
| 29 | April 26 | Diamondbacks | — | — | — | — | — | 0–0 |
| 30 | April 27 | @ Padres | — | — | — | — | — | 0–0 |
| 31 | April 28 | @ Padres | — | — | — | — | — | 0–0 |
| 32 | April 29 | @ Padres | — | — | — | — | — | 0–0 |
| 33 | April 30 | @ Giants | — | — | — | — | — | 0–0 |

May: 0–0 (Home: 0–0; Road: 0–0)

| # | Date | Opponent | Score | Win | Loss | Save | Attendance | Record |
|---|---|---|---|---|---|---|---|---|
| 34 | May 1 | @ Giants | — | — | — | — | — | 0–0 |
| 35 | May 2 | @ Giants | — | — | — | — | — | 0–0 |
| 36 | May 4 | Mets | — | — | — | — | — | 0–0 |
| 37 | May 5 | Mets | — | — | — | — | — | 0–0 |
| 38 | May 6 | Mets | — | — | — | — | — | 0–0 |
| 39 | May 7 | Braves | — | — | — | — | — | 0–0 |
| 40 | May 8 | Braves | — | — | — | — | — | 0–0 |
| 41 | May 9 | Braves | — | — | — | — | — | 0–0 |
| 42 | May 11 | @ Mets | — | — | — | — | — | 0–0 |
| 43 | May 12 | @ Mets | — | — | — | — | — | 0–0 |
| 44 | May 13 | @ Mets | — | — | — | — | — | 0–0 |
| 45 | May 14 | @ Yankees | — | — | — | — | — | 0–0 |
| 46 | May 15 | @ Yankees | — | — | — | — | — | 0–0 |
| 47 | May 16 | @ Yankees | — | — | — | — | — | 0–0 |
| 48 | May 17 | Marlins | — | — | — | — | — | 0–0 |
| 49 | May 18 | Marlins | — | — | — | — | — | 0–0 |
| 50 | May 19 | Marlins | — | — | — | — | — | 0–0 |
| 51 | May 21 | Angels | — | — | — | — | — | 0–0 |
| 52 | May 22 | Angels | — | — | — | — | — | 0–0 |
| 53 | May 23 | Angels | — | — | — | — | — | 0–0 |
| 54 | May 25 | @ Rays | — | — | — | — | — | 0–0 |
| 55 | May 26 | @ Rays | — | — | — | — | — | 0–0 |
| 56 | May 27 | @ Rays | — | — | — | — | — | 0–0 |
| 57 | May 28 | @ Rangers | — | — | — | — | — | 0–0 |
| 58 | May 29 | @ Rangers | — | — | — | — | — | 0–0 |
| 59 | May 30 | @ Rangers | — | — | — | — | — | 0–0 |
| 60 | May 31 | Blue Jays | — | — | — | — | — | 0–0 |

June: 0–0 (Home: 0–0; Road: 0–0)

| # | Date | Opponent | Score | Win | Loss | Save | Attendance | Record |
|---|---|---|---|---|---|---|---|---|
| 61 | June 1 | Blue Jays | — | — | — | — | — | 0–0 |
| 62 | June 2 | Blue Jays | — | — | — | — | — | 0–0 |
| 63 | June 4 | Orioles | — | — | — | — | — | 0–0 |
| 64 | June 5 | Orioles | — | — | — | — | — | 0–0 |
| 65 | June 6 | Orioles | — | — | — | — | — | 0–0 |
| 66 | June 7 | @ White Sox | — | — | — | — | — | 0–0 |
| 67 | June 8 | @ White Sox | — | — | — | — | — | 0–0 |
| 68 | June 9 | @ White Sox | — | — | — | — | — | 0–0 |
| 69 | June 11 | @ Blue Jays | — | — | — | — | — | 0–0 |
| 70 | June 12 | @ Blue Jays | — | — | — | — | — | 0–0 |
| 71 | June 13 | @ Blue Jays | — | — | — | — | — | 0–0 |
| 72 | June 14 | Twins | — | — | — | — | — | 0–0 |
| 73 | June 15 | Twins | — | — | — | — | — | 0–0 |
| 74 | June 16 | Twins | — | — | — | — | — | 0–0 |
| 75 | June 18 | Giants | — | — | — | — | — | 0–0 |
| 76 | June 19 | Giants | — | — | — | — | — | 0–0 |
| 77 | June 20 | Giants | — | — | — | — | — | 0–0 |
| 78 | June 21 | @ Braves | — | — | — | — | — | 0–0 |
| 79 | June 22 | @ Braves | — | — | — | — | — | 0–0 |
| 80 | June 23 | @ Braves | — | — | — | — | — | 0–0 |
| 81 | June 24 | @ Braves | — | — | — | — | — | 0–0 |
| 82 | June 25 | @ Pirates | — | — | — | — | — | 0–0 |
| 83 | June 26 | @ Pirates | — | — | — | — | — | 0–0 |
| 84 | June 27 | @ Pirates | — | — | — | — | — | 0–0 |
| 85 | June 29 | Rockies | — | — | — | — | — | 0–0 |
| 86 | June 30 | Rockies | — | — | — | — | — | 0–0 |

July: 0–0 (Home: 0–0; Road: 0–0)

| # | Date | Opponent | Score | Win | Loss | Save | Attendance | Record |
|---|---|---|---|---|---|---|---|---|
| 87 | July 1 | Rockies | — | — | — | — | — | 0–0 |
| 88 | July 2 | Mariners | — | — | — | — | — | 0–0 |
| 89 | July 3 | Mariners | — | — | — | — | — | 0–0 |
| 90 | July 4 | Mariners | — | — | — | — | — | 0–0 |
| 91 | July 5 | @ Guardians | — | — | — | — | — | 0–0 |
| 92 | July 6 | @ Guardians | — | — | — | — | — | 0–0 |
| 93 | July 7 | @ Guardians | — | — | — | — | — | 0–0 |
| 94 | July 9 | @ Nationals | — | — | — | — | — | 0–0 |
| 95 | July 10 | @ Nationals | — | — | — | — | — | 0–0 |
| 96 | July 11 | @ Nationals | — | — | — | — | — | 0–0 |
| – | July 13 | **2027 Major League Baseball All-Star Game at Wrigley Field in Chicago, Illinois** | | | | | | |
| 97 | July 16 | Pirates | — | — | — | — | — | 0–0 |
| 98 | July 17 | Pirates | — | — | — | — | — | 0–0 |
| 99 | July 18 | Pirates | — | — | — | — | — | 0–0 |
| 100 | July 19 | @ Braves | — | — | — | — | — | 0–0 |
| 101 | July 20 | @ Braves | — | — | — | — | — | 0–0 |
| 102 | July 21 | @ Braves | — | — | — | — | — | 0–0 |
| 103 | July 22 | @ Mets | — | — | — | — | — | 0–0 |
| 104 | July 23 | @ Mets | — | — | — | — | — | 0–0 |
| 105 | July 24 | @ Mets | — | — | — | — | — | 0–0 |
| 106 | July 25 | @ Mets | — | — | — | — | — | 0–0 |
| 107 | July 27 | Red Sox | — | — | — | — | — | 0–0 |
| 108 | July 28 | Red Sox | — | — | — | — | — | 0–0 |
| 109 | July 29 | Red Sox | — | — | — | — | — | 0–0 |
| 110 | July 30 | @ Marlins | — | — | — | — | — | 0–0 |
| 111 | July 31 | @ Marlins | — | — | — | — | — | 0–0 |

August: 0–0 (Home: 0–0; Road: 0–0)

| # | Date | Opponent | Score | Win | Loss | Save | Attendance | Record |
|---|---|---|---|---|---|---|---|---|
| 112 | August 1 | @ Marlins | — | — | — | — | — | 0–0 |
| 113 | August 2 | Cardinals | — | — | — | — | — | 0–0 |
| 114 | August 3 | Cardinals | — | — | — | — | — | 0–0 |
| 115 | August 4 | Cardinals | — | — | — | — | — | 0–0 |
| 116 | August 6 | Royals | — | — | — | — | — | 0–0 |
| 117 | August 7 | Royals | — | — | — | — | — | 0–0 |
| 118 | August 8 | Royals | — | — | — | — | — | 0–0 |
| 119 | August 9 | @ Rockies | — | — | — | — | — | 0–0 |
| 120 | August 10 | @ Rockies | — | — | — | — | — | 0–0 |
| 121 | August 11 | @ Rockies | — | — | — | — | — | 0–0 |
| 122 | August 12 | @ Rockies | — | — | — | — | — | 0–0 |
| 123 | August 13 | @ Dodgers | — | — | — | — | — | 0–0 |
| 124 | August 14 | @ Dodgers | — | — | — | — | — | 0–0 |
| 125 | August 15 | @ Dodgers | — | — | — | — | — | 0–0 |
| 126 | August 17 | Padres | — | — | — | — | — | 0–0 |
| 127 | August 18 | Padres | — | — | — | — | — | 0–0 |
| 128 | August 19 | Padres | — | — | — | — | — | 0–0 |
| 129 | August 20 | Reds | — | — | — | — | — | 0–0 |
| 130 | August 21 | Reds | — | — | — | — | — | 0–0 |
| 131 | August 22 | Reds | — | — | — | — | — | 0–0 |
| 132 | August 24 | @ Athletics | — | — | — | — | — | 0–0 |
| 133 | August 25 | @ Athletics | — | — | — | — | — | 0–0 |
| 134 | August 26 | @ Athletics | — | — | — | — | — | 0–0 |
| 135 | August 27 | @ Diamondbacks | — | — | — | — | — | 0–0 |
| 136 | August 28 | @ Diamondbacks | — | — | — | — | — | 0–0 |
| 137 | August 29 | @ Diamondbacks | — | — | — | — | — | 0–0 |
| 138 | August 31 | Braves | — | — | — | — | — | 0–0 |

September: 0–0 (Home: 0–0; Road: 0–0)

| # | Date | Opponent | Score | Win | Loss | Save | Attendance | Record |
|---|---|---|---|---|---|---|---|---|
| 139 | September 1 | Braves | — | — | — | — | — | 0–0 |
| 140 | September 2 | Braves | — | — | — | — | — | 0–0 |
| 141 | September 3 | Mets | — | — | — | — | — | 0–0 |
| 142 | September 4 | Mets | — | — | — | — | — | 0–0 |
| 143 | September 5 | Mets | — | — | — | — | — | 0–0 |
| 144 | September 6 | Marlins | — | — | — | — | — | 0–0 |
| 145 | September 7 | Marlins | — | — | — | — | — | 0–0 |
| 146 | September 8 | Marlins | — | — | — | — | — | 0–0 |
| 147 | September 9 | Marlins | — | — | — | — | — | 0–0 |
| 148 | September 10 | @ Cardinals | — | — | — | — | — | 0–0 |
| 149 | September 11 | @ Cardinals | — | — | — | — | — | 0–0 |
| 150 | September 12 | @ Cardinals | — | — | — | — | — | 0–0 |
| 151 | September 14 | @ Reds | — | — | — | — | — | 0–0 |
| 152 | September 15 | @ Reds | — | — | — | — | — | 0–0 |
| 153 | September 16 | @ Reds | — | — | — | — | — | 0–0 |
| 154 | September 17 | @ Astros | — | — | — | — | — | 0–0 |
| 155 | September 18 | @ Astros | — | — | — | — | — | 0–0 |
| 156 | September 19 | @ Astros | — | — | — | — | — | 0–0 |
| 157 | September 21 | Cubs | — | — | — | — | — | 0–0 |
| 158 | September 22 | Cubs | — | — | — | — | — | 0–0 |
| 159 | September 23 | Cubs | — | — | — | — | — | 0–0 |
| 160 | September 24 | Nationals | — | — | — | — | — | 0–0 |
| 161 | September 25 | Nationals | — | — | — | — | — | 0–0 |
| 162 | September 26 | Nationals | — | — | — | — | — | 0–0 |

== Current roster ==
Philadelphia Phillies 2027 spring training roster
| 40-man roster | | Non-roster invitees | Coaches / other |
|---|---|---|---|
| Pitchers: 19 Kyle Backhus; 58 Tanner Banks; 52 Jonathan Bowlan; 59 Jhoan Durán; 51 Grant Holman; 40 Brad Keller; 50 Orion Kerkering; 56 Caleb Kilian; 60 Max Lazar; -- Jordan Leasure; 44 Jesús Luzardo; 37 Tim Mayza; 71 Alex McFarlane; 27 Aaron Nola; 24 Andrew Painter; 57 Alan Rangel; 61 Cristopher Sánchez; 55 Chase Shugart; 45 Zack Wheeler | Catchers: 13 Rafael Marchán; 10 J. T. Realmuto; Infielders: 3 Bryce Harper; -- Bryan Rincon; 5 Bryson Stott; 7 Trea Turner; -- Shay Whitcomb; Outfielders: 2 Justin Crawford; 49 Derek Hill; 31 Otto Kemp; 16 Brandon Marsh; 18 Kameron Misner; 29 Félix Reyes; 17 Gabriel Rincones Jr.; 23 Johan Rojas; -- Colby Thomas; Designated hitters: 12 Kyle Schwarber | Pitchers: -- Geoff Hartlieb; -- Max Kranick; Catchers: -- Brian Navarreto; Infielders: -- Bryan Ramos | Manager: 8 Don Mattingly; Coaches: 95 Mike Calitri (major league field coordinator); -- Carlos Mendoza (third base/infield); 65 Caleb Cotham (pitching); 38 Paco Figueroa (first base); 97 Brad Flanders (bullpen catcher); -- Peter Fatse (hitting); -- Joe Cronin (assistant hitting); 93 Mark Lowy (assistant pitching); 94 Rafael Pena (assistant hitting); 98 Hector Rabago (bullpen catcher); 91 Cesar Ramos (bullpen); 62 Dusty Wathan (bench); 36 active, 0 inactive, 4 non-roster invitees; 7-, 10-, or 15-day injured list; * Not on active roster; ^{†} Suspended list; Roster, coaches, and NRIs updated November 20, 2026; Transactions • Depth chart; → All MLB rosters |

== Farm system ==
| Level | Team | League | Manager |
|---|---|---|---|
| AAA | Lehigh Valley IronPigs | International League | |
| AA | Reading Fightin Phils | Eastern League | |
| High A | Jersey Shore BlueClaws | South Atlantic League | |
| Low-A | Clearwater Threshers | Florida State League | |
| Rookie | FCL Phillies | Florida Complex League | |
| Rookie | DSL Phillies | Dominican Summer League | |
