= 2027 Pittsburgh Pirates season =

2027 Pittsburgh Pirates
- League: National League
- Division: Central
- Ballpark: PNC Park
- City: Pittsburgh, Pennsylvania (Note: From 1882–1906, the team played in Allegheny, Pennsylvania, which became annexed by Pittsburgh as the North Side in 1907.)
- Owner: Bob Nutting
- General manager: Ben Cherington
- Manager: Don Kelly
- Television: SportsNet Pittsburgh
- Radio: KDKA-FM; Pittsburgh Pirates Radio Network
- Stats: ESPN.com; Baseball Reference

The 2027 Pittsburgh Pirates season is scheduled to be the franchise's 146th season overall, as well their 141st season as a member of the National League, and the 27th season at PNC Park. The Pirates would attempt to return to the playoffs for the first time since 2015.

The season is contingent on Major League Baseball (MLB) and the Major League Baseball Players Association (MLBPA) signing a new collective bargaining agreement (CBA). Without a new CBA, MLB is expected to lock out the players on December 2, 2026, until one is signed. If such a lockout extends indefinitely, the season could be postponed, shortened, or even cancelled.

== Game log ==
The 2027 schedule is tentative until a new collective bargaining agreement (CBA) is signed between Major League Baseball (MLB) and the Major League Baseball Players Association (MLBPA). If the labor dispute extends into late February or early March, MLB would then start to consider whether to postpone or shorten the season.

Legend
	Pirates win
	Pirates loss
	Postponement
**Bold**	Pirates team member

2027 Game Log: 0–0 (Home: 0–0; Away: 0–0)
March/April: 0–0 (Home: 0–0; Road: 0–0)

#	Date	Opponent	Score	Win	Loss	Save	Attendance	Record	Streak
1	March 25	Athletics	—	—	—	—	—	–	—
2	March 26	Athletics	—	—	—	—	—	–	—
3	March 27	Athletics	—	—	—	—	—	–	—
4	March 29	@ Reds	—	—	—	—	—	–	—
5	March 30	@ Reds	—	—	—	—	—	–	—
6	March 31	@ Reds	—	—	—	—	—	–	—
7	April 2	Padres	—	—	—	—	—	–	—
8	April 3	Padres	—	—	—	—	—	–	—
9	April 4	Padres	—	—	—	—	—	–	—
10	April 5	Yankees	—	—	—	—	—	–	—
11	April 6	Yankees	—	—	—	—	—	–	—
12	April 7	Yankees	—	—	—	—	—	–	—
13	April 9	@ Royals	—	—	—	—	—	–	—
14	April 10	@ Royals	—	—	—	—	—	–	—
15	April 11	@ Royals	—	—	—	—	—	–	—
16	April 12	@ Brewers	—	—	—	—	—	–	—
17	April 13	@ Brewers	—	—	—	—	—	–	—
18	April 14	@ Brewers	—	—	—	—	—	–	—
19	April 15	@ Brewers	—	—	—	—	—	–	—
20	April 16	Reds	—	—	—	—	—	–	—
21	April 17	Reds	—	—	—	—	—	–	—
22	April 18	Reds	—	—	—	—	—	–	—
23	April 20	Giants	—	—	—	—	—	–	—
24	April 21	Giants	—	—	—	—	—	–	—
25	April 22	Giants	—	—	—	—	—	–	—
26	April 23	@ Cubs	—	—	—	—	—	–	—
27	April 24	@ Cubs	—	—	—	—	—	–	—
28	April 25	@ Cubs	—	—	—	—	—	–	—
29	April 27	@ Rays	—	—	—	—	—	–	—
30	April 28	@ Rays	—	—	—	—	—	–	—
31	April 29	@ Rays	—	—	—	—	—	–	—
32	April 30	Nationals	—	—	—	—	—	–	—

May: 0–0 (Home: 0–0; Road: 0–0)

#	Date	Opponent	Score	Win	Loss	Save	Attendance	Record	Streak
33	May 1	Nationals	—	—	—	—	—	–	—
34	May 2	Nationals	—	—	—	—	—	–	—
35	May 3	Cubs	—	—	—	—	—	–	—
36	May 4	Cubs	—	—	—	—	—	–	—
37	May 5	Cubs	—	—	—	—	—	–	—
38	May 6	Cubs	—	—	—	—	—	–	—
39	May 7	@ Twins	—	—	—	—	—	–	—
40	May 8	@ Twins	—	—	—	—	—	–	—
41	May 9	@ Twins	—	—	—	—	—	–	—
42	May 11	Brewers	—	—	—	—	—	–	—
43	May 12	Brewers	—	—	—	—	—	–	—
44	May 13	Brewers	—	—	—	—	—	–	—
45	May 14	@ Mariners	—	—	—	—	—	–	—
46	May 15	@ Mariners	—	—	—	—	—	–	—
47	May 16	@ Mariners	—	—	—	—	—	–	—
48	May 17	@ Rockies	—	—	—	—	—	–	—
49	May 18	@ Rockies	—	—	—	—	—	–	—
50	May 19	@ Rockies	—	—	—	—	—	–	—
51	May 21	White Sox	—	—	—	—	—	–	—
52	May 22	White Sox	—	—	—	—	—	–	—
53	May 23	White Sox	—	—	—	—	—	–	—
54	May 24	Cardinals	—	—	—	—	—	–	—
55	May 25	Cardinals	—	—	—	—	—	–	—
56	May 26	Cardinals	—	—	—	—	—	–	—
57	May 27	Cardinals	—	—	—	—	—	–	—
58	May 28	@ Braves	—	—	—	—	—	–	—
59	May 29	@ Braves	—	—	—	—	—	–	—
60	May 30	@ Braves	—	—	—	—	—	–	—
61	May 31	@ Cardinals	—	—	—	—	—	–	—

June: 0–0 (Home: 0–0; Road: 0–0)

#	Date	Opponent	Score	Win	Loss	Save	Attendance	Record	Streak
62	June 1	@ Cardinals	—	—	—	—	—	–	—
63	June 2	@ Cardinals	—	—	—	—	—	–	—
64	June 4	Blue Jays	—	—	—	—	—	–	—
65	June 5	Blue Jays	—	—	—	—	—	–	—
66	June 6	Blue Jays	—	—	—	—	—	–	—
67	June 8	Astros	—	—	—	—	—	–	—
68	June 9	Astros	—	—	—	—	—	–	—
69	June 10	Astros	—	—	—	—	—	–	—
70	June 11	@ Dodgers	—	—	—	—	—	–	—
71	June 12	@ Dodgers	—	—	—	—	—	–	—
72	June 13	@ Dodgers	—	—	—	—	—	–	—
73	June 14	@ Angels	—	—	—	—	—	–	—
74	June 15	@ Angels	—	—	—	—	—	–	—
75	June 16	@ Angels	—	—	—	—	—	–	—
76	June 18	@ Padres	—	—	—	—	—	–	—
77	June 19	@ Padres	—	—	—	—	—	–	—
78	June 20	@ Padres	—	—	—	—	—	–	—
79	June 22	Tigers	—	—	—	—	—	–	—
80	June 23	Tigers	—	—	—	—	—	–	—
81	June 24	Tigers	—	—	—	—	—	–	—
82	June 25	Phillies	—	—	—	—	—	–	—
83	June 26	Phillies	—	—	—	—	—	–	—
84	June 27	Phillies	—	—	—	—	—	–	—
85	June 28	@ Brewers	—	—	—	—	—	–	—
86	June 29	@ Brewers	—	—	—	—	—	–	—
87	June 30	@ Brewers	—	—	—	—	—	–	—

July: 0–0 (Home: 0–0; Road: 0–0)

#	Date	Opponent	Score	Win	Loss	Save	Attendance	Record	Streak
88	July 1	@ Marlins	—	—	—	—	—	–	—
89	July 2	@ Marlins	—	—	—	—	—	–	—
90	July 3	@ Marlins	—	—	—	—	—	–	—
91	July 4	@ Marlins	—	—	—	—	—	–	—
92	July 6	Dodgers	—	—	—	—	—	–	—
93	July 7	Dodgers	—	—	—	—	—	–	—
94	July 8	Dodgers	—	—	—	—	—	–	—
95	July 9	Marlins	—	—	—	—	—	–	—
96	July 10	Marlins	—	—	—	—	—	–	—
97	July 11	Marlins	—	—	—	—	—	–	—
**97th All-Star Game in Chicago, IL**
98	July 16	@ Phillies	—	—	—	—	—	–	—
99	July 17	@ Phillies	—	—	—	—	—	–	—
100	July 18	@ Phillies	—	—	—	—	—	–	—
101	July 19	@ Cubs	—	—	—	—	—	–	—
102	July 20	@ Cubs	—	—	—	—	—	–	—
103	July 21	@ Cubs	—	—	—	—	—	–	—
104	July 23	Diamondbacks	—	—	—	—	—	–	—
105	July 24	Diamondbacks	—	—	—	—	—	–	—
106	July 25	Diamondbacks	—	—	—	—	—	–	—
107	July 26	Braves	—	—	—	—	—	–	—
108	July 27	Braves	—	—	—	—	—	–	—
109	July 28	Braves	—	—	—	—	—	–	—
110	July 29	Braves	—	—	—	—	—	–	—
111	July 30	Mets	—	—	—	—	—	–	—
112	July 31	Mets	—	—	—	—	—	–	—

August: 0–0 (Home: 0–0; Road: 0–0)

#	Date	Opponent	Score	Win	Loss	Save	Attendance	Record	Streak
113	August 1	Mets	—	—	—	—	—	–	—
114	August 3	@ Nationals	—	—	—	—	—	–	—
115	August 4	@ Nationals	—	—	—	—	—	–	—
116	August 5	@ Nationals	—	—	—	—	—	–	—
117	August 6	@ Orioles	—	—	—	—	—	–	—
118	August 7	@ Orioles	—	—	—	—	—	–	—
119	August 8	@ Orioles	—	—	—	—	—	–	—
120	August 9	Reds	—	—	—	—	—	–	—
121	August 10	Reds	—	—	—	—	—	–	—
122	August 11	Reds	—	—	—	—	—	–	—
123	August 13	Rangers	—	—	—	—	—	–	—
124	August 14	Rangers	—	—	—	—	—	–	—
125	August 15	Rangers	—	—	—	—	—	–	—
126	August 16	@ Reds	—	—	—	—	—	–	—
127	August 17	@ Reds	—	—	—	—	—	–	—
128	August 18	@ Reds	—	—	—	—	—	–	—
129	August 19	@ Reds	—	—	—	—	—	–	—
130	August 20	@ Red Sox	—	—	—	—	—	–	—
131	August 21	@ Red Sox	—	—	—	—	—	–	—
132	August 22	@ Red Sox	—	—	—	—	—	–	—
133	August 23	Cubs	—	—	—	—	—	–	—
134	August 24	Cubs	—	—	—	—	—	–	—
135	August 25	Cubs	—	—	—	—	—	–	—
136	August 27	Rockies	—	—	—	—	—	–	—
137	August 28	Rockies	—	—	—	—	—	–	—
138	August 29	Rockies	—	—	—	—	—	–	—
139	August 31	@ Tigers	—	—	—	—	—	–	—

September: 0–0 (Home: 0–0; Road: 0–0)

#	Date	Opponent	Score	Win	Loss	Save	Attendance	Record	Streak
140	September 1	@ Tigers	—	—	—	—	—	–	—
141	September 2	@ Tigers	—	—	—	—	—	–	—
142	September 3	Brewers	—	—	—	—	—	–	—
143	September 4	Brewers	—	—	—	—	—	–	—
144	September 5	Brewers	—	—	—	—	—	–	—
145	September 6	@ Diamondbacks	—	—	—	—	—	–	—
146	September 7	@ Diamondbacks	—	—	—	—	—	–	—
147	September 8	@ Diamondbacks	—	—	—	—	—	–	—
148	September 10	@ Giants	—	—	—	—	—	–	—
149	September 11	@ Giants	—	—	—	—	—	–	—
150	September 12	@ Giants	—	—	—	—	—	–	—
151	September 14	Cardinals	—	—	—	—	—	–	—
152	September 15	Cardinals	—	—	—	—	—	–	—
153	September 16	Cardinals	—	—	—	—	—	–	—
154	September 17	Guardians	—	—	—	—	—	–	—
155	September 18	Guardians	—	—	—	—	—	–	—
156	September 19	Guardians	—	—	—	—	—	–	—
157	September 21	@ Mets	—	—	—	—	—	–	—
158	September 22	@ Mets	—	—	—	—	—	–	—
159	September 23	@ Mets	—	—	—	—	—	–	—
160	September 24	@ Cardinals	—	—	—	—	—	–	—
161	September 25	@ Cardinals	—	—	—	—	—	–	—
162	September 26	@ Cardinals	—	—	—	—	—	–	—

== Roster ==
Pittsburgh Pirates 2027 spring training roster
40-man roster		Non-roster invitees	Coaches / other
Pitchers: 35 Braxton Ashcraft; 71 Lake Bachar; 45 Hunter Barco; 36 Bubba Chandler; 64 Khristian Curtis; 66 Wilber Dotel; 14 Brandon Eisert; 78 Thomas Harrington; 17 Jared Jones; 23 Mitch Keller; 89 Antwone Kelly; 50 Carmen Mlodzinski; 46 Mason Montgomery; 49 Yohan Ramírez; 48 Evan Sisk; 30 Paul Skenes; 18 Luke Weaver	Catchers: 32 Henry Davis; 43 Rafael Flores Jr.; -- Axiel Plaz; 13 Endy Rodríguez; Infielders: 76 Jack Brannigan; 3 Nick Gonzales; 26 Jacob Gonzalez; 6 Konnor Griffin; 2 Spencer Horwitz; 19 Jared Triolo; 38 Nick Yorke; Outfielders: -- Akil Baddoo; 37 Tyler Callihan; 25 Billy Cook; 15 Oneil Cruz; 34 Jhostynxon García; -- Mitch Jebb; 28 Jake Mangum; 29 Ryan O'Hearn; 10 Bryan Reynolds; 63 Ronny Simon; 55 Esmerlyn Valdez	Outfielders: -- Chas McCormick	Manager: 12 Don Kelly; Coaches: -- Cam Balego (bullpen catcher); 27 Tony Beasley (third base); 67 Cibney Bello (assistant pitching); 16 Tarrik Brock (first base); 82 Jordan Comadena (catching); 52 Matt Hague (hitting); 90 Raul Hernandez (bullpen catcher); 54 Gene Lamont (special assignment); 88 Christian Marrero (assistant hitting); 95 Stephen Morales (assistant coach); 51 Bill Murphy (pitching); 41 Kristopher Negrón (bench); 87 Miguel Pérez (bullpen); 44 Chris Truby (infield); 98 Jonny Tucker (assistant hitting); 39 active, 0 inactive, 1 non-roster invitees; 7-, 10-, or 15-day injured list; * Not on active roster; ^{†} Suspended list; Roster, coaches, and NRIs updated November 20, 2026; Transactions • Depth chart; → All MLB rosters

== Farm system ==
Level	Team	League	Manager
Triple-A	Indianapolis Indians	International League	
Double-A	Altoona Curve	Eastern League	
High-A	Greensboro Grasshoppers	South Atlantic League	
Low-A	Bradenton Marauders	Florida State League	
Rookie	FCL Pirates	Florida Complex League	
Rookie	DSL Pirates Black	Dominican Summer League	
Rookie	DSL Pirates Gold	Dominican Summer League	
