= 2027 San Diego Padres season =

2027 San Diego Padres
- League: National League
- Division: West
- Ballpark: Petco Park
- City: San Diego, California
- Owners: Seidler Equity Partners
- General manager: A. J. Preller
- Manager: Craig Stammen
- Television: MLB Local Media
- Radio: KWFN · KBZT

The 2027 San Diego Padres season is scheduled to be the 59th season of the San Diego Padres franchise. The Padres compete in Major League Baseball (MLB) as a member club of the National League (NL) West Division. The team plays its home games at Petco Park.

The season is contingent on Major League Baseball (MLB) and the Major League Baseball Players Association (MLBPA) signing a new collective bargaining agreement (CBA). Without a new CBA, MLB is expected to lock out the players on December 2, 2026, until one is signed. If such a lockout extends indefinitely, the season could be postponed, shortened, or even cancelled.

== Game log ==
The 2027 schedule is tentative until a new collective bargaining agreement (CBA) is signed between Major League Baseball (MLB) and the Major League Baseball Players Association (MLBPA). If the labor dispute extends into late February or early March, MLB would then start to consider whether to postpone or shorten the season.

2027 Game Log: 0–0 (Home: 0–0; Road: 0–0)
March/April: 0–0 (Home: 0–0; Road: 0–0)

#	Date	Opponent	Score	Win	Loss	Save	Attendance	Record	Streak
1	March 25	Diamondbacks	—	—	—	—	—	0–0	—
2	March 26	Diamondbacks	—	—	—	—	—	0–0	—
3	March 27	Diamondbacks	—	—	—	—	—	0–0	—
4	March 28	Diamondbacks	—	—	—	—	—	0–0	—
5	March 29	Rockies	—	—	—	—	—	0–0	—
6	March 30	Rockies	—	—	—	—	—	0–0	—
7	March 31	Rockies	—	—	—	—	—	0–0	—
8	April 2	@ Pirates	—	—	—	—	—	0–0	—
9	April 3	@ Pirates	—	—	—	—	—	0–0	—
10	April 4	@ Pirates	—	—	—	—	—	0–0	—
11	April 5	@ Cardinals	—	—	—	—	—	0–0	—
12	April 6	@ Cardinals	—	—	—	—	—	0–0	—
13	April 7	@ Cardinals	—	—	—	—	—	0–0	—
14	April 9	Dodgers	—	—	—	—	—	0–0	—
15	April 10	Dodgers	—	—	—	—	—	0–0	—
16	April 11	Dodgers	—	—	—	—	—	0–0	—
17	April 12	Cardinals	—	—	—	—	—	0–0	—
18	April 13	Cardinals	—	—	—	—	—	0–0	—
19	April 14	Cardinals	—	—	—	—	—	0–0	—
20	April 15	Cardinals	—	—	—	—	—	0–0	—
21	April 16	@ Diamondbacks	—	—	—	—	—	0–0	—
22	April 17	@ Diamondbacks	—	—	—	—	—	0–0	—
23	April 18	@ Diamondbacks	—	—	—	—	—	0–0	—
24	April 20	@ Rockies	—	—	—	—	—	0–0	—
25	April 21	@ Rockies	—	—	—	—	—	0–0	—
26	April 22	@ Rockies	—	—	—	—	—	0–0	—
27	April 23	@ Twins	—	—	—	—	—	0–0	—
28	April 24	@ Twins	—	—	—	—	—	0–0	—
29	April 25	@ Twins	—	—	—	—	—	0–0	—
30	April 27	Phillies	—	—	—	—	—	0–0	—
31	April 28	Phillies	—	—	—	—	—	0–0	—
32	April 29	Phillies	—	—	—	—	—	0–0	—
33	April 30	Orioles	—	—	—	—	—	0–0	—

May: 0–0 (Home: 0–0; Road: 0–0)

#	Date	Opponent	Score	Win	Loss	Save	Attendance	Record	Streak
34	May 1	Orioles	—	—	—	—	—	0–0	—
35	May 2	Orioles	—	—	—	—	—	0–0	—
36	May 4	@ Braves	—	—	—	—	—	0–0	—
37	May 5	@ Braves	—	—	—	—	—	0–0	—
38	May 6	@ Braves	—	—	—	—	—	0–0	—
39	May 7	@ Tigers	—	—	—	—	—	0–0	—
40	May 8	@ Tigers	—	—	—	—	—	0–0	—
41	May 9	@ Tigers	—	—	—	—	—	0–0	—
42	May 10	Royals	—	—	—	—	—	0–0	—
43	May 11	Royals	—	—	—	—	—	0–0	—
44	May 12	Royals	—	—	—	—	—	0–0	—
45	May 14	Reds	—	—	—	—	—	0–0	—
46	May 15	Reds	—	—	—	—	—	0–0	—
47	May 16	Reds	—	—	—	—	—	0–0	—
48	May 17	Mets	—	—	—	—	—	0–0	—
49	May 18	Mets	—	—	—	—	—	0–0	—
50	May 19	Mets	—	—	—	—	—	0–0	—
51	May 21	@ Dodgers	—	—	—	—	—	0–0	—
52	May 22	@ Dodgers	—	—	—	—	—	0–0	—
53	May 23	@ Dodgers	—	—	—	—	—	0–0	—
54	May 24	@ Giants	—	—	—	—	—	0–0	—
55	May 25	@ Giants	—	—	—	—	—	0–0	—
56	May 26	@ Giants	—	—	—	—	—	0–0	—
57	May 27	@ Giants	—	—	—	—	—	0–0	—
58	May 28	Red Sox	—	—	—	—	—	0–0	—
59	May 29	Red Sox	—	—	—	—	—	0–0	—
60	May 30	Red Sox	—	—	—	—	—	0–0	—
61	May 31	@ Athletics	—	—	—	—	—	0–0	—

June: 0–0 (Home: 0–0; Road: 0–0)

#	Date	Opponent	Score	Win	Loss	Save	Attendance	Record	Streak
62	June 1	@ Athletics	—	—	—	—	—	0–0	—
63	June 2	@ Athletics	—	—	—	—	—	0–0	—
64	June 4	Brewers	—	—	—	—	—	0–0	—
65	June 5	Brewers	—	—	—	—	—	0–0	—
66	June 6	Brewers	—	—	—	—	—	0–0	—
67	June 7	Giants	—	—	—	—	—	0–0	—
68	June 8	Giants	—	—	—	—	—	0–0	—
69	June 9	Giants	—	—	—	—	—	0–0	—
70	June 11	@ Marlins	—	—	—	—	—	0–0	—
71	June 12	@ Marlins	—	—	—	—	—	0–0	—
72	June 13	@ Marlins	—	—	—	—	—	0–0	—
73	June 15	@ Mets	—	—	—	—	—	0–0	—
74	June 16	@ Mets	—	—	—	—	—	0–0	—
75	June 17	@ Mets	—	—	—	—	—	0–0	—
76	June 18	Pirates	—	—	—	—	—	0–0	—
77	June 19	Pirates	—	—	—	—	—	0–0	—
78	June 20	Pirates	—	—	—	—	—	0–0	—
79	June 21	Cubs	—	—	—	—	—	0–0	—
80	June 22	Cubs	—	—	—	—	—	0–0	—
81	June 23	Cubs	—	—	—	—	—	0–0	—
82	June 25	@ Blue Jays	—	—	—	—	—	0–0	—
83	June 26	@ Blue Jays	—	—	—	—	—	0–0	—l
84	June 27	@ Blue Jays	—	—	—	—	—	0–0	—
85	June 28	@ Cubs	—	—	—	—	—	0–0	—
86	June 29	@ Cubs	—	—	—	—	—	0–0	—
87	June 30	@ Cubs	—	—	—	—	—	0–0	—

July: 0–0 (Home: 0–0; Road: 0–0)

#	Date	Opponent	Score	Win	Loss	Save	Attendance	Record	Streak
88	July 2	Rays	—	—	—	—	—	0–0	—
89	July 3	Rays	—	—	—	—	—	0–0	—
90	July 4	Rays	—	—	—	—	—	0–0	—
91	July 6	@ Mariners	—	—	—	—	—	0–0	—
92	July 7	@ Mariners	—	—	—	—	—	0–0	—
93	July 8	@ Mariners	—	—	—	—	—	0–0	—
94	July 9	@ Rockies	—	—	—	—	—	0–0	—
95	July 10 (1)	@ Rockies	—	—	—	—	—	0–0	—
96	July 10 (2)	@ Rockies	—	—	—	—	—	0–0	—
97	July 11	@ Rockies	—	—	—	—	—	0–0	—
**97th All-Star Game: Chicago, IL**
98	July 16	Mariners	—	—	—	—	—	0–0	—
99	July 17	Mariners	—	—	—	—	—	0–0	—
100	July 18	Mariners	—	—	—	—	—	0–0	—
101	July 19	Angels	—	—	—	—	—	0–0	—
102	July 20	Angels	—	—	—	—	—	0–0	—
103	July 21	Angels	—	—	—	—	—	0–0	—
104	July 23	@ Giants	—	—	—	—	—	0–0	—
105	July 24	@ Giants	—	—	—	—	—	0–0	—
106	July 25	@ Giants	—	—	—	—	—	0–0	—
107	July 26	Dodgers	—	—	—	—	—	0–0	—
108	July 27	Dodgers	—	—	—	—	—	0–0	—
109	July 28	Dodgers	—	—	—	—	—	0–0	—
110	July 29	Dodgers	—	—	—	—	—	0–0	—
111	July 30	@ Astros	—	—	—	—	—	0–0	—
112	July 31	@ Astros	—	—	—	—	—	0–0	—

August: 0–0 (Home: 0–0; Road: 0–0)

#	Date	Opponent	Score	Win	Loss	Save	Attendance	Record	Streak
113	August 1	@ Astros	—	—	—	—	—	0–0	—
114	August 2	@ Brewers	—	—	—	—	—	0–0	—
115	August 3	@ Brewers	—	—	—	—	—	0–0	—
116	August 4	@ Brewers	—	—	—	—	—	0–0	—
117	August 6	Marlins	—	—	—	—	—	0–0	—
118	August 7	Marlins	—	—	—	—	—	0–0	—
119	August 8	Marlins	—	—	—	—	—	0–0	—
120	August 9	Diamondbacks	—	—	—	—	—	0–0	—
121	August 10	Diamondbacks	—	—	—	—	—	0–0	—
122	August 11	Diamondbacks	—	—	—	—	—	0–0	—
123	August 13	@ Nationals	—	—	—	—	—	0–0	—
124	August 14	@ Nationals	—	—	—	—	—	0–0	—
125	August 15	@ Nationals	—	—	—	—	—	0–0	—
126	August 16	@ Nationals	—	—	—	—	—	0–0	—
127	August 17	@ Phillies	—	—	—	—	—	0–0	—
128	August 18	@ Phillies	—	—	—	—	—	0–0	—
129	August 19	@ Phillies	—	—	—	—	—	0–0	—
130	August 20	Nationals	—	—	—	—	—	0–0	—
131	August 21	Nationals	—	—	—	—	—	0–0	—
132	August 22	Nationals	—	—	—	—	—	0–0	—
133	August 23	Guardians	—	—	—	—	—	0–0	—
134	August 24	Guardians	—	—	—	—	—	0–0	—
135	August 25	Guardians	—	—	—	—	—	0–0	—
136	August 27	@ Reds	—	—	—	—	—	0–0	—
137	August 28	@ Reds	—	—	—	—	—	0–0	—
138	August 29	@ Reds	—	—	—	—	—	0–0	—
139	August 31	@ Yankees	—	—	—	—	—	0–0	—

September: 0–0 (Home: 0–0; Road: 0–0)

#	Date	Opponent	Score	Win	Loss	Save	Attendance	Record	Streak
140	September 1	@ Yankees	—	—	—	—	—	0–0	—
141	September 2	@ Yankees	—	—	—	—	—	0–0	—
142	September 3	Rockies	—	—	—	—	—	0–0	—
143	September 4	Rockies	—	—	—	—	—	0–0	—
144	September 5	Rockies	—	—	—	—	—	0–0	—
145	September 6	Giants	—	—	—	—	—	0–0	—
146	September 7	Giants	—	—	—	—	—	0–0	—
147	September 8	Giants	—	—	—	—	—	0–0	—
148	September 10	@ Dodgers	—	—	—	—	—	0–0	—
149	September 11	@ Dodgers	—	—	—	—	—	0–0	—
150	September 12	@ Dodgers	—	—	—	—	—	0–0	—
151	September 14	Braves	—	—	—	—	—	0–0	—
152	September 15	Braves	—	—	—	—	—	0–0	—
153	September 16	Braves	—	—	—	—	—	0–0	—
154	September 17	Rangers	—	—	—	—	—	0–0	—
155	September 18	Rangers	—	—	—	—	—	0–0	—
156	September 19	Rangers	—	—	—	—	—	0–0	—
157	September 21	@ Diamondbacks	—	—	—	—	—	0–0	—
158	September 22	@ Diamondbacks	—	—	—	—	—	0–0	—
159	September 23	@ Diamondbacks	—	—	—	—	—	0–0	—
160	September 24	@ White Sox	—	—	—	—	—	0–0	—
161	September 25	@ White Sox	—	—	—	—	—	0–0	—
162	September 26	@ White Sox	—	—	—	—	—	0–0	—

Legend: = Win = Loss = Postponement
Bold = Padres team member

== Current roster ==
San Diego Padres 2027 spring training roster
40-man roster		Non-roster invitees	Coaches / other
Pitchers: 76 Jhony Brito; 56 Jeremiah Estrada; -- Luis Gutierrez; 68 Kyle Hart; 78 Bryan Hoeing; -- Ian Koenig; 1 Yuki Matsui; 22 Mason Miller; 66 David Morgan; 44 Joe Musgrove; -- Tucker Musgrove; 58 Wandy Peralta; 72 Bradgley Rodríguez; 63 Hunter Stratton; 98 Randy Vásquez; -- Ryan Weiss	Catchers: 12 Luis Campusano; 48 Rodolfo Durán; 54 Freddy Fermin; 8 Ethan Salas; Infielders: 2 Xander Bogaerts; 9 Jake Cronenworth; 13 Manny Machado; 18 Mason McCoy; 30 Gavin Sheets; 24 Sung-mun Song; 99 Gage Workman; Outfielders: 4 Jase Bowen; 29 Dustin Harris; 3 Jackson Merrill; 23 Fernando Tatís Jr.; 0 Samad Taylor; Designated hitters: 7 Will Wagner	Outfielders: -- Kala'i Rosario; -- Cal Stevenson	Manager: 14 Craig Stammen; Coaches: 86 Heberto Andrade (bullpen catcher/coaching assistant); 88 Chris Apecechea (assistant pitching); 81 Morgan Burkhart (major league coaching assistant); 82 Brian Esposito (major league coach); 53 Ben Fritz (bullpen); 81 Ryan Goins (infield); 70 Robby Hammock (field coordinator); 20 Bob Henley (third base/infield and base running instructor); 49 Randy Knorr (bench); 46 David Macias (first base/outfield and base running instructor); 89 Mike McCoy (assistant hitting); 57 Ruben Niebla (pitching); 85 Pat O'Sullivan (assistant hitting); 82 Kevin Plawecki (catching); 80 Nick Punto (major league coach); -- Scott Servais (coaching assistant); 28 Steven Souza Jr. (hitting); 87 Scott Stroud (coaching assistant); 83 Peter Summerville (game planning/coaching assistant); Restricted list: 11 Yu Darvish; 33 active, 0 inactive, 2 non-roster invitees; 7-, 10-, or 15-day injured list; * Not on active roster; ^{†} Suspended list; Roster, coaches, and NRIs updated November 20, 2026; Transactions • Depth chart; → All MLB rosters

== Farm system ==
Level	Team	League	Manager	W	L	Position
Triple-A	El Paso Chihuahuas	Pacific Coast League				
Double-A	San Antonio Missions	Texas League				
High-A	Fort Wayne TinCaps	Midwest League				
Low-A	Lake Elsinore Storm	California League				
Rookie	ACL Padres	Arizona Complex League				
Rookie	DSL Padres Gold	Dominican Summer League				
Rookie	DSL Padres Brown	Dominican Summer League				
