= 2027 Kansas City Royals season =

2027 Kansas City Royals
- League: American League
- Division: Central
- Ballpark: Kauffman Stadium
- City: Kansas City, Missouri
- Owners: John Sherman
- General manager: J.J. Picollo
- Manager: Matt Quatraro
- Television: MLB Local Media
- Radio: KFNZ 96.5 The Fan

The 2027 Kansas City Royals season is scheduled to be the 59th season for the franchise, and their 55th at Kauffman Stadium.

The season is contingent on Major League Baseball (MLB) and the Major League Baseball Players Association (MLBPA) signing a new collective bargaining agreement (CBA). Without a new CBA, MLB is expected to lock out the players on December 2, 2026, until one is signed. If such a lockout extends indefinitely, the season could be postponed, shortened, or even cancelled.

== Game log ==
The 2027 schedule is tentative until a new collective bargaining agreement (CBA) is signed between Major League Baseball (MLB) and the Major League Baseball Players Association (MLBPA). If the labor dispute extends into late February or early March, MLB would then start to consider whether to postpone or shorten the season.

Legend
Royals Win	Royals Loss	Game postponed

2027 Game Log: 0–0 (Home: 0–0; Road: 0–0)
March/April: 0–0 (Home: 0–0; Road: 0–0)

#	Date	Opponent	Score	Win	Loss	Save	Attendance	Record	Streak
1	March 25	Twins	—	—	—	—	—	–	—
2	March 27	Twins	—	—	—	—	—	–	—
3	March 28	Twins	—	—	—	—	—	–	—
4	March 29	White Sox	—	—	—	—	—	–	—
5	March 30	White Sox	—	—	—	—	—	–	—
6	March 31	White Sox	—	—	—	—	—	–	—
7	April 1	@ Cardinals	—	—	—	—	—	–	—
8	April 3	@ Cardinals	—	—	—	—	—	–	—
9	April 4	@ Cardinals	—	—	—	—	—	–	—
10	April 5	@ Angels	—	—	—	—	—	–	—
11	April 6	@ Angels	—	—	—	—	—	–	—
12	April 7	@ Angels	—	—	—	—	—	–	—
13	April 9	Pirates	—	—	—	—	—	–	—
14	April 10	Pirates	—	—	—	—	—	–	—
15	April 11	Pirates	—	—	—	—	—	–	—
16	April 13	Athletics	—	—	—	—	—	–	—
17	April 14	Athletics	—	—	—	—	—	–	—
18	April 15	Athletics	—	—	—	—	—	–	—
19	April 16	Rays	—	—	—	—	—	–	—
20	April 17	Rays	—	—	—	—	—	–	—
21	April 18	Rays	—	—	—	—	—	–	—
22	April 20	@ Orioles	—	—	—	—	—	–	—
23	April 21	@ Orioles	—	—	—	—	—	–	—
24	April 22	@ Orioles	—	—	—	—	—	–	—
25	April 23	@ Guardians	—	—	—	—	—	–	—
26	April 24	@ Guardians	—	—	—	—	—	–	—
27	April 25	@ Guardians	—	—	—	—	—	–	—
28	April 26	Yankees	—	—	—	—	—	–	—
29	April 27	Yankees	—	—	—	—	—	–	—
30	April 28	Yankees	—	—	—	—	—	–	—
31	April 29	@ Rangers	—	—	—	—	—	–	—
32	April 30	@ Rangers	—	—	—	—	—	–	—

May: 0–0 (Home: 0–0; Road: 0–0)

#	Date	Opponent	Score	Win	Loss	Save	Attendance	Record	Streak
33	May 1	@ Rangers	—	—	—	—	—	–	—
34	May 2	@ Rangers	—	—	—	—	—	–	—
35	May 3	Reds	—	—	—	—	—	–	—
36	May 4	Reds	—	—	—	—	—	–	—
37	May 5	Reds	—	—	—	—	—	–	—
38	May 7	Blue Jays	—	—	—	—	—	–	—
39	May 8	Blue Jays	—	—	—	—	—	–	—
40	May 9	Blue Jays	—	—	—	—	—	–	—
41	May 10	@ Padres	—	—	—	—	—	–	—
42	May 11	@ Padres	—	—	—	—	—	–	—
43	May 12	@ Padres	—	—	—	—	—	–	—
44	May 14	@ Giants	—	—	—	—	—	–	—
45	May 15	@ Giants	—	—	—	—	—	–	—
46	May 16	@ Giants	—	—	—	—	—	–	—
47	May 18	Nationals	—	—	—	—	—	–	—
48	May 19	Nationals	—	—	—	—	—	–	—
49	May 20	Nationals	—	—	—	—	—	–	—
50	May 21	Braves	—	—	—	—	—	–	—
51	May 22	Braves	—	—	—	—	—	–	—
52	May 23	Braves	—	—	—	—	—	–	—
53	May 25	@ Cubs	—	—	—	—	—	–	—
54	May 26	@ Cubs	—	—	—	—	—	–	—
55	May 27	@ Cubs	—	—	—	—	—	–	—
56	May 28	@ Tigers	—	—	—	—	—	–	—
57	May 29	@ Tigers	—	—	—	—	—	–	—
58	May 30	@ Tigers	—	—	—	—	—	–	—
59	May 31	@ Yankees	—	—	—	—	—	–	—

June: 0–0 (Home: 0–0; Road: 0–0)

#	Date	Opponent	Score	Win	Loss	Save	Attendance	Record	Streak
60	June 1	@ Yankees	—	—	—	—	—	–	—
61	June 2	@ Yankees	—	—	—	—	—	–	—
62	June 4	Tigers	—	—	—	—	—	–	—
63	June 5	Tigers	—	—	—	—	—	–	—
64	June 6	Tigers	—	—	—	—	—	–	—
65	June 7	Mets	—	—	—	—	—	–	—
66	June 8	Mets	—	—	—	—	—	–	—
67	June 9	Mets	—	—	—	—	—	–	—
68	June 11	Guardians	—	—	—	—	—	–	—
69	June 12	Guardians	—	—	—	—	—	–	—
70	June 13	Guardians	—	—	—	—	—	–	—
71	June 14	@ Brewers	—	—	—	—	—	–	—
72	June 15	@ Brewers	—	—	—	—	—	–	—
73	June 16	@ Brewers	—	—	—	—	—	–	—
74	June 18	@ Astros	—	—	—	—	—	–	—
75	June 19	@ Astros	—	—	—	—	—	–	—
76	June 20	@ Astros	—	—	—	—	—	–	—
77	June 21	Orioles	—	—	—	—	—	–	—
78	June 22	Orioles	—	—	—	—	—	–	—
79	June 23	Orioles	—	—	—	—	—	–	—
80	June 24	@ White Sox	—	—	—	—	—	–	—
81	June 25	@ White Sox	—	—	—	—	—	–	—
82	June 26	@ White Sox	—	—	—	—	—	–	—
83	June 27	@ White Sox	—	—	—	—	—	–	—
84	June 28	Astros	—	—	—	—	—	–	—
85	June 29	Astros	—	—	—	—	—	–	—
86	June 30	Astros	—	—	—	—	—	–	—

July: 0–0 (Home: 0–0; Road: 0–0)

#	Date	Opponent	Score	Win	Loss	Save	Attendance	Record	Streak
87	July 1	Astros	—	—	—	—	—	–	—
88	July 2	Tigers	—	—	—	—	—	–	—
89	July 3	Tigers	—	—	—	—	—	–	—
90	July 4	Tigers	—	—	—	—	—	–	—
91	July 6	@ Twins	—	—	—	—	—	–	—
92	July 7	@ Twins	—	—	—	—	—	–	—
93	July 8	@ Twins	—	—	—	—	—	–	—
94	July 9	@ Mariners	—	—	—	—	—	–	—
95	July 10	@ Mariners	—	—	—	—	—	–	—
96	July 11	@ Mariners	—	—	—	—	—	–	—
97th All-Star Game in Chicago, Illinois
97	July 16	Cardinals	—	—	—	—	—	–	—
98	July 17	Cardinals	—	—	—	—	—	–	—
99	July 18	Cardinals	—	—	—	—	—	–	—
100	July 19	Mariners	—	—	—	—	—	–	—
101	July 20	Mariners	—	—	—	—	—	–	—
102	July 21	Mariners	—	—	—	—	—	–	—
103	July 23	@ Rays	—	—	—	—	—	–	—
104	July 24	@ Rays	—	—	—	—	—	–	—
105	July 25	@ Rays	—	—	—	—	—	–	—
106	July 26	@ White Sox	—	—	—	—	—	–	—
107	July 27	@ White Sox	—	—	—	—	—	–	—
108	July 28	@ White Sox	—	—	—	—	—	–	—
109	July 29	Twins	—	—	—	—	—	–	—
110	July 30	Twins	—	—	—	—	—	–	—
111	July 31	Twins	—	—	—	—	—	–	—

August: 0–0 (Home: 0–0; Road: 0–0)

#	Date	Opponent	Score	Win	Loss	Save	Attendance	Record	Streak
112	August 1	Twins	—	—	—	—	—	–	—
113	August 3	Rockies	—	—	—	—	—	–	—
114	August 4	Rockies	—	—	—	—	—	–	—
115	August 5	Rockies	—	—	—	—	—	–	—
116	August 6	@ Phillies	—	—	—	—	—	–	—
117	August 7	@ Phillies	—	—	—	—	—	–	—
118	August 8	@ Phillies	—	—	—	—	—	–	—
119	August 9	@ Twins	—	—	—	—	—	–	—
120	August 10	@ Twins	—	—	—	—	—	–	—
121	August 11	@ Twins	—	—	—	—	—	–	—
122	August 12	Red Sox*	—	—	—	—	—	–	—
123	August 14	Red Sox	—	—	—	—	—	–	—
124	August 15	Red Sox	—	—	—	—	—	–	—
125	August 16	Rangers	—	—	—	—	—	–	—
126	August 17	Rangers	—	—	—	—	—	–	—
127	August 18	Rangers	—	—	—	—	—	–	—
128	August 20	@ Tigers	—	—	—	—	—	–	—
129	August 21	@ Tigers	—	—	—	—	—	–	—
130	August 22	@ Tigers	—	—	—	—	—	–	—
131	August 23	@ Tigers	—	—	—	—	—	–	—
132	August 24	@ Blue Jays	—	—	—	—	—	–	—
133	August 25	@ Blue Jays	—	—	—	—	—	–	—
134	August 26	@ Blue Jays	—	—	—	—	—	–	—
135	August 27	@ Marlins	—	—	—	—	—	–	—
136	August 28	@ Marlins	—	—	—	—	—	–	—
137	August 29	@ Marlins	—	—	—	—	—	–	—
138	August 30	White Sox	—	—	—	—	—	–	—
139	August 31	White Sox	—	—	—	—	—	–	—
*August 12 game played at Field of Dreams in Dyersville, Iowa

September: 0–0 (Home: 0–0; Road: 0–0)

#	Date	Opponent	Score	Win	Loss	Save	Attendance	Record	Streak
140	September 1	White Sox	—	—	—	—	—	–	—
141	September 3	Dodgers	—	—	—	—	—	–	—
142	September 4	Dodgers	—	—	—	—	—	–	—
143	September 5	Dodgers	—	—	—	—	—	–	—
144	September 6	@ Athletics	—	—	—	—	—	–	—
145	September 7	@ Athletics	—	—	—	—	—	–	—
146	September 8	@ Athletics	—	—	—	—	—	–	—
147	September 10	@ Diamondbacks	—	—	—	—	—	–	—
148	September 11	@ Diamondbacks	—	—	—	—	—	–	—
149	September 12	@ Diamondbacks	—	—	—	—	—	–	—
150	September 13	Guardians	—	—	—	—	—	–	—
151	September 14	Guardians	—	—	—	—	—	–	—
152	September 15	Guardians	—	—	—	—	—	–	—
153	September 16	Guardians	—	—	—	—	—	–	—
154	September 17	Angels	—	—	—	—	—	–	—
155	September 18	Angels	—	—	—	—	—	–	—
156	September 19	Angels	—	—	—	—	—	–	—
157	September 21	@ Guardians	—	—	—	—	—	–	—
158	September 22	@ Guardians	—	—	—	—	—	–	—
159	September 23	@ Guardians	—	—	—	—	—	–	—
160	September 24	@ Red Sox	—	—	—	—	—	–	—
161	September 25	@ Red Sox	—	—	—	—	—	–	—
162	September 26	@ Red Sox	—	—	—	—	—	–	—

== Current roster ==
Kansas City Royals 2027 spring training roster
40-man roster		Non-roster invitees	Coaches / other
Pitchers: -- Angel Bastardo; 38 Ryan Bergert; 76 Spencer Bivens; -- Lucas Braun; 65 Noah Cameron; 74 José Cuas; 62 Randy Dobnak; 45 Carlos Durán; 60 Lucas Erceg; -- Logan Evans; -- José A. Ferrer; 36 Tony Gonsolin; 35 Nolan Hoffman; 59 Ben Kudrna; 67 Seth Lugo; 41 Daniel Lynch IV; -- Bryce Miller; 61 Nate Pearson; 54 Mitch Spence; 50 Connor Thomas; 52 Michael Wacha; 44 Beck Way; 63 Steven Zobac	Catchers: 22 Carter Jensen; Infielders: 12 Nick Loftin; 19 Michael Massey; 9 Vinnie Pasquantino; 2 Tyler Tolbert; 7 Bobby Witt Jr.; Outfielders: 14 Jac Caglianone; 1 Isaac Collins; 24 Matthew Lugo; 16 John Rave; -- Carson Roccaforte; Designated hitters: 13 Salvador Perez	Pitchers: -- Hobie Harris; -- Vince Velasquez	Manager: 33 Matt Quatraro; Coaches: 68 José Alguacil (infield); 70 Connor Dawson (assistant hitting); 80 Allan de San Miguel (bullpen catcher); 82 Miguel Garcia (coach); 83 Juan Graterol (bullpen catcher); 39 Damon Hollins (first base); 49 Paul Hoover (bench); 84 Mike McFerran (assistant pitching); 57 Mitch Stetter (bullpen); 85 Brian Sweeney (pitching); 99 Marcus Thames (assistant hitting); 25 Vance Wilson (third base); 37 Alec Zumwalt (hitting); 60-day injured list: 58 Luinder Avila; 32 Stephen Kolek; 55 Cole Ragans; Restricted list: 64 Steven Cruz; 35 active, 0 inactive, 2 non-roster invitees; 7-, 10-, or 15-day injured list; * Not on active roster; ^{†} Suspended list; Roster, coaches, and NRIs updated November 20, 2026; Transactions • Depth chart; → All MLB rosters

== Farm system ==
Level	Team	League	Manager
AAA	Omaha Storm Chasers	International League	
AA	Northwest Arkansas Naturals	Texas League	
High-A	Quad Cities River Bandits	Midwest League	
Low-A	Columbia Fireflies	Carolina League	
Rookie	ACL Royals	Arizona Complex League	
Rookie	DSL Royals Fortuna	Dominican Summer League	
Rookie	DSL Royals Ventura	Dominican Summer League	
