= 2027 Texas Rangers season =

Major League Baseball season

2027 Texas Rangers
- League: American League
- Division: West
- Ballpark: Globe Life Field
- City: Arlington
- Owners: Ray Davis & Bob R. Simpson
- President of baseball operations: Chris Young
- General managers: Ross Fenstermaker
- Manager: Skip Schumaker
- Television: Rangers Sports Network; Victory+ (direct-to-consumer streaming)
- Radio: KRLD 105.3 FM (English); KZMP 1540 AM (Spanish)
- Stats: ESPN.com; Baseball Reference

The 2027 Texas Rangers season is scheduled to be the 67th of the Texas Rangers franchise overall, their 56th in Arlington as the Rangers, and the 8th season at Globe Life Field. The Rangers would attempt to improve upon their 80–82 record from 2026, make the playoffs after a three-year absence, and end their ten-year AL West title drought.

The season is contingent on Major League Baseball (MLB) and the Major League Baseball Players Association (MLBPA) signing a new collective bargaining agreement (CBA). Without a new CBA, MLB is expected to lock out the players on December 2, 2026, until one is signed. If such a lockout extends indefinitely, the season could be postponed, shortened, or even cancelled.

== Game log ==
The 2027 schedule is tentative until a new collective bargaining agreement (CBA) is signed between Major League Baseball (MLB) and the Major League Baseball Players Association (MLBPA). If the labor dispute extends into late February or early March, MLB would then start to consider whether to postpone or shorten the season.

=== Regular season ===
Legend
Rangers Win	Rangers Loss	Game postponed

2027 Game Log: 0–0 (Home: 0–0; Away: 0–0)
March/April: 0–0 (Home: 0–0; Road: 0–0)

#	Date	Opponent	Score	Win	Loss	Save	Attendance	Record	Streak
1	March 25	@ Astros	—	—	—	—	—	–	—
2	March 26	@ Astros	—	—	—	—	—	–	—
3	March 27	@ Astros	—	—	—	—	—	–	—
4	March 29	@ Mariners	—	—	—	—	—	–	—
5	March 30	@ Mariners	—	—	—	—	—	–	—
6	March 31	@ Mariners	—	—	—	—	—	–	—
7	April 1	Athletics	—	—	—	—	—	–	—
8	April 2	Athletics	—	—	—	—	—	–	—
9	April 3	Athletics	—	—	—	—	—	–	—
10	April 4	Athletics	—	—	—	—	—	–	—
11	April 6	Rays	—	—	—	—	—	–	—
12	April 7	Rays	—	—	—	—	—	–	—
13	April 8	Rays	—	—	—	—	—	–	—
14	April 9	@ Cubs	—	—	—	—	—	–	—
15	April 10	@ Cubs	—	—	—	—	—	–	—
16	April 11	@ Cubs	—	—	—	—	—	–	—
17	April 13	@ Reds	—	—	—	—	—	–	—
18	April 14	@ Reds	—	—	—	—	—	–	—
19	April 15	@ Reds	—	—	—	—	—	–	—
20	April 16	Cardinals	—	—	—	—	—	–	—
21	April 17	Cardinals	—	—	—	—	—	–	—
22	April 18	Cardinals	—	—	—	—	—	–	—
23	April 19	Mariners	—	—	—	—	—	–	—
24	April 20	Mariners	—	—	—	—	—	–	—
25	April 21	Mariners	—	—	—	—	—	–	—
26	April 23	@ Mets	—	—	—	—	—	–	—
27	April 24	@ Mets	—	—	—	—	—	–	—
28	April 25	@ Mets	—	—	—	—	—	–	—
29	April 26	@ Nationals	—	—	—	—	—	–	—
30	April 27	@ Nationals	—	—	—	—	—	–	—
31	April 28	@ Nationals	—	—	—	—	—	–	—
32	April 29	Royals	—	—	—	—	—	–	—
33	April 30	Royals	—	—	—	—	—	–	—

May: 0–0 (Home: 0–0; Road: 0–0)

#	Date	Opponent	Score	Win	Loss	Save	Attendance	Record	Streak
34	May 1	Royals	—	—	—	—	—	–	—
35	May 2	Royals	—	—	—	—	—	–	—
36	May 3	Astros	—	—	—	—	—	–	—
37	May 4	Astros	—	—	—	—	—	–	—
38	May 5	Astros	—	—	—	—	—	–	—
39	May 6	Astros	—	—	—	—	—	–	—
40	May 7	@ Diamondbacks	—	—	—	—	—	–	—
41	May 8	@ Diamondbacks	—	—	—	—	—	–	—
42	May 9	@ Diamondbacks	—	—	—	—	—	–	—
43	May 11	@ Giants	—	—	—	—	—	–	—
44	May 12	@ Giants	—	—	—	—	—	–	—
45	May 13	@ Giants	—	—	—	—	—	–	—
46	May 14	Tigers	—	—	—	—	—	–	—
47	May 15	Tigers	—	—	—	—	—	–	—
48	May 16	Tigers	—	—	—	—	—	–	—
49	May 18	Blue Jays	—	—	—	—	—	–	—
50	May 19	Blue Jays	—	—	—	—	—	–	—
51	May 20	Blue Jays	—	—	—	—	—	–	—
52	May 21	@ Red Sox	—	—	—	—	—	–	—
53	May 22	@ Red Sox	—	—	—	—	—	–	—
54	May 23	@ Red Sox	—	—	—	—	—	–	—
55	May 24	@ Twins	—	—	—	—	—	–	—
56	May 25	@ Twins	—	—	—	—	—	–	—
57	May 26	@ Twins	—	—	—	—	—	–	—
58	May 28	Phillies	—	—	—	—	—	–	—
59	May 29	Phillies	—	—	—	—	—	–	—
60	May 30	Phillies	—	—	—	—	—	–	—
61	May 31	Guardians	—	—	—	—	—	–	—

June: 0–0 (Home: 0–0; Road: 0–0)

#	Date	Opponent	Score	Win	Loss	Save	Attendance	Record	Streak
62	June 1	Guardians	—	—	—	—	—	–	—
63	June 2	Guardians	—	—	—	—	—	–	—
64	June 4	@ Angels	—	—	—	—	—	–	—
65	June 5	@ Angels	—	—	—	—	—	–	—
66	June 6	@ Angels	—	—	—	—	—	–	—
67	June 7	@ Athletics	—	—	—	—	—	–	—
68	June 8	@ Athletics	—	—	—	—	—	–	—
69	June 9	@ Athletics	—	—	—	—	—	–	—
70	June 11	Angels	—	—	—	—	—	–	—
71	June 12	Angels	—	—	—	—	—	–	—
72	June 13	Angels	—	—	—	—	—	–	—
73	June 14	Rockies	—	—	—	—	—	–	—
74	June 15	Rockies	—	—	—	—	—	–	—
75	June 16	Rockies	—	—	—	—	—	–	—
76	June 18	Orioles	—	—	—	—	—	–	—
77	June 19	Orioles	—	—	—	—	—	–	—
78	June 20	Orioles	—	—	—	—	—	–	—
79	June 21	@ White Sox	—	—	—	—	—	–	—
80	June 22	@ White Sox	—	—	—	—	—	–	—
81	June 23	@ White Sox	—	—	—	—	—	–	—
82	June 25	@ Orioles	—	—	—	—	—	–	—
83	June 26	@ Orioles	—	—	—	—	—	–	—
84	June 27	@ Orioles	—	—	—	—	—	–	—
85	June 28	Braves	—	—	—	—	—	–	—
86	June 29	Braves	—	—	—	—	—	–	—
87	June 30	Braves	—	—	—	—	—	–	—

July: 0–0 (Home: 0–0; Road: 0–0)

#	Date	Opponent	Score	Win	Loss	Save	Attendance	Record	Streak
88	July 2	White Sox	—	—	—	—	—	–	—
89	July 3	White Sox	—	—	—	—	—	–	—
90	July 4	White Sox	—	—	—	—	—	–	—
91	July 5	@ Angels	—	—	—	—	—	–	—
92	July 6	@ Angels	—	—	—	—	—	–	—
93	July 7	@ Angels	—	—	—	—	—	–	—
94	July 8	@ Angels	—	—	—	—	—	–	—
95	July 9	@ Athletics	—	—	—	—	—	–	—
96	July 10	@ Athletics	—	—	—	—	—	–	—
97	July 11	@ Athletics	—	—	—	—	—	–	—
97th All-Star Game: Chicago, IL
98	July 16	Astros	—	—	—	—	—	–	—
99	July 17	Astros	—	—	—	—	—	–	—
100	July 18	Astros	—	—	—	—	—	–	—
101	July 19	Twins	—	—	—	—	—	–	—
102	July 20	Twins	—	—	—	—	—	–	—
103	July 21	Twins	—	—	—	—	—	–	—
104	July 23	@ Blue Jays	—	—	—	—	—	–	—
105	July 24	@ Blue Jays	—	—	—	—	—	–	—
106	July 25	@ Blue Jays	—	—	—	—	—	–	—
107	July 26	@ Rays	—	—	—	—	—	–	—
108	July 27	@ Rays	—	—	—	—	—	–	—
109	July 28	@ Rays	—	—	—	—	—	–	—
110	July 29	@ Rays	—	—	—	—	—	–	—
111	July 30	Diamondbacks	—	—	—	—	—	–	—
112	July 31	Diamondbacks	—	—	—	—	—	–	—

August: 0–0 (Home: 0–0; Road: 0–0)

#	Date	Opponent	Score	Win	Loss	Save	Attendance	Record	Streak
113	August 1	Diamondbacks	—	—	—	—	—	–	—
114	August 3	@ Guardians	—	—	—	—	—	–	—
115	August 4	@ Guardians	—	—	—	—	—	–	—
116	August 5	@ Guardians	—	—	—	—	—	–	—
117	August 6	Athletics	—	—	—	—	—	–	—
118	August 7	Athletics	—	—	—	—	—	–	—
119	August 8	Athletics	—	—	—	—	—	–	—
120	August 9	Dodgers	—	—	—	—	—	–	—
121	August 10	Dodgers	—	—	—	—	—	–	—
122	August 11	Dodgers	—	—	—	—	—	–	—
123	August 13	@ Pirates	—	—	—	—	—	–	—
124	August 14	@ Pirates	—	—	—	—	—	–	—
125	August 15	@ Pirates	—	—	—	—	—	–	—
126	August 16	@ Royals	—	—	—	—	—	–	—
127	August 17	@ Royals	—	—	—	—	—	–	—
128	August 18	@ Royals	—	—	—	—	—	–	—
129	August 20	@ Yankees	—	—	—	—	—	–	—
130	August 21	@ Yankees	—	—	—	—	—	–	—
131	August 22	@ Yankees	—	—	—	—	—	–	—
132	August 23	Mariners	—	—	—	—	—	–	—
133	August 24	Mariners	—	—	—	—	—	–	—
134	August 25	Mariners	—	—	—	—	—	–	—
135	August 27	Red Sox	—	—	—	—	—	–	—
136	August 28	Red Sox	—	—	—	—	—	–	—
137	August 29	Red Sox	—	—	—	—	—	–	—
138	August 31	@ Astros	—	—	—	—	—	–	—

September: 0–0 (Home: 0–0; Road: 0–0)

#	Date	Opponent	Score	Win	Loss	Save	Attendance	Record	Streak
139	September 1	@ Astros	—	—	—	—	—	–	—
140	September 2	@ Astros	—	—	—	—	—	–	—
141	September 3	@ Tigers	—	—	—	—	—	–	—
142	September 4	@ Tigers	—	—	—	—	—	–	—
143	September 5	@ Tigers	—	—	—	—	—	–	—
144	September 6	Yankees	—	—	—	—	—	–	—
145	September 7	Yankees	—	—	—	—	—	–	—
146	September 8	Yankees	—	—	—	—	—	–	—
147	September 10	Angels	—	—	—	—	—	–	—
148	September 11	Angels	—	—	—	—	—	–	—
149	September 12	Angels	—	—	—	—	—	–	—
150	September 13	@ Mariners	—	—	—	—	—	–	—
151	September 14	@ Mariners	—	—	—	—	—	–	—
152	September 15	@ Mariners	—	—	—	—	—	–	—
153	September 16	@ Mariners	—	—	—	—	—	–	—
154	September 17	@ Padres	—	—	—	—	—	–	—
155	September 18	@ Padres	—	—	—	—	—	–	—
156	September 19	@ Padres	—	—	—	—	—	–	—
157	September 21	Marlins	—	—	—	—	—	–	—
158	September 22	Marlins	—	—	—	—	—	–	—
159	September 23	Marlins	—	—	—	—	—	–	—
160	September 24	Brewers	—	—	—	—	—	–	—
161	September 25	Brewers	—	—	—	—	—	–	—
162	September 26	Brewers	—	—	—	—	—	–	—

== Current roster ==
Texas Rangers 2027 spring training roster
40-man roster		Non-roster invitees	Coaches / other
Pitchers: 54 Robby Ahlstrom; 61 Cody Bradford; 65 Gavin Collyer; 59 José Corniell; -- Aidan Curry; 72 David Davalillo; 48 Jacob deGrom; 17 Nathan Eovaldi; 62 Robert Garcia; 1 MacKenzie Gore; 75 Peyton Gray; 67 Jacob Latz; 22 Jack Leiter; 74 Leandro López; 71 Adam Macko; 58 Michel Otañez; 70 Ben Peoples; 80 Kumar Rocker; 47 Winston Santos; 63 Chase Silseth; 56 Emiliano Teodo; -- Josh White; 60 Cole Winn	Catchers: 9 Danny Jansen; Infielders: 21 Jake Burger; 20 Ezequiel Durán; 14 Justin Foscue; 39 Cody Freeman; 6 Josh Jung; 5 Corey Seager; Outfielders: 32 Evan Carter; 27 Cameron Cauley; 36 Wyatt Langford; 24 Brandon Nimmo; 19 Alejandro Osuna; Designated hitters: 4 Logan O'Hoppe	Pitchers: -- Dylan File	Manager: 55 Skip Schumaker; Coaches: 88 Rod Barajas (quality control); 82 Eric Dorton (assistant hitting); 87 Brett Hayes (catching); 96 Travis Jankowski (first base); -- Tommy Joseph (hitting); 64 Corey Ragsdale (third base); 84 Colby Suggs (bullpen); 83 Jordan Tiegs (pitching); 81 Luis Urueta (bench); 89 Justin Viele (lead hitting); 36 active, 0 inactive, 1 non-roster invitees; 7-, 10-, or 15-day injured list; * Not on active roster; ^{†} Suspended list; Roster, coaches, and NRIs updated November 20, 2026; Transactions • Depth chart; → All MLB rosters

== Farm system ==
Level	Team	League	Manager
Triple-A	Round Rock Express	Pacific Coast League	
Double-A	Frisco RoughRiders	Texas League	
High-A	Hub City Spartanburgers	South Atlantic League	
Single-A	Hickory Crawdads	Carolina League	
Rookie	ACL Rangers	Arizona Complex League	
Foreign Rookie	DSL Rangers Blue	Dominican Summer League	
Foreign Rookie	DSL Rangers Red	Dominican Summer League	
