= 2027 Cincinnati Reds season =

2027 Cincinnati Reds
- League: National League
- Division: Central
- Ballpark: Great American Ball Park
- City: Cincinnati
- Owner: Bob Castellini
- General manager: Nick Krall
- Manager: Terry Francona
- Television: MLB Local Media
- Radio: WLW (700 AM); Reds Radio Network
- Stats: ESPN.com; Baseball Reference

The 2027 Cincinnati Reds season is scheduled to be the 158th season for the franchise in Major League Baseball, and their 25th at Great American Ball Park in Cincinnati. The Reds would attempt to return to the playoffs after a one-year absence and win the NL Central for the first time since 2012.

The season is contingent on Major League Baseball (MLB) and the Major League Baseball Players Association (MLBPA) signing a new collective bargaining agreement (CBA). Without a new CBA, MLB is expected to lock out the players on December 2, 2026, until one is signed. If such a lockout extends indefinitely, the season could be postponed, shortened, or even cancelled.

== Game log ==
The 2027 schedule is tentative until a new collective bargaining agreement (CBA) is signed between Major League Baseball (MLB) and the Major League Baseball Players Association (MLBPA). If the labor dispute extends into late February or early March, MLB would then start to consider whether to postpone or shorten the season.

Legend
Reds Win	Reds Loss	Game postponed

2027 Game Log: 0–0 (Home: 0–0; Away: 0–0)
March/April: 0–0 (Home: 0–0; Road: 0–0)

#	Date	Opponent	Score	Win	Loss	Save	Attendance	Record	Streak
1	March 25	Cardinals	—	—	—	—	—	–	—
2	March 27	Cardinals	—	—	—	—	—	–	—
3	March 28	Cardinals	—	—	—	—	—	–	—
4	March 29	Pirates	—	—	—	—	—	–	—
5	March 30	Pirates	—	—	—	—	—	–	—
6	March 31	Pirates	—	—	—	—	—	–	—
7	April 1	@ Red Sox	—	—	—	—	—	–	—
8	April 3	@ Red Sox	—	—	—	—	—	–	—
9	April 4	@ Red Sox	—	—	—	—	—	–	—
10	April 5	@ Mets	—	—	—	—	—	–	—
11	April 6	@ Mets	—	—	—	—	—	–	—
12	April 7	@ Mets	—	—	—	—	—	–	—
13	April 8	@ Mets	—	—	—	—	—	–	—
14	April 9	Twins	—	—	—	—	—	–	—
15	April 10	Twins	—	—	—	—	—	–	—
16	April 11	Twins	—	—	—	—	—	–	—
17	April 13	Rangers	—	—	—	—	—	–	—
18	April 14	Rangers	—	—	—	—	—	–	—
19	April 15	Rangers	—	—	—	—	—	–	—
20	April 16	@ Pirates	—	—	—	—	—	–	—
21	April 17	@ Pirates	—	—	—	—	—	–	—
22	April 18	@ Pirates	—	—	—	—	—	–	—
23	April 19	@ Marlins	—	—	—	—	—	–	—
24	April 20	@ Marlins	—	—	—	—	—	–	—
25	April 21	@ Marlins	—	—	—	—	—	–	—
26	April 23	Giants	—	—	—	—	—	–	—
27	April 24	Giants	—	—	—	—	—	–	—
28	April 25	Giants	—	—	—	—	—	–	—
29	April 26	Marlins	—	—	—	—	—	–	—
30	April 27	Marlins	—	—	—	—	—	–	—
31	April 28	Marlins	—	—	—	—	—	–	—
32	April 30	@ Brewers	—	—	—	—	—	–	—

May: 0–0 (Home: 0–0; Road: 0–0)

#	Date	Opponent	Score	Win	Loss	Save	Attendance	Record	Streak
33	May 1	@ Brewers	—	—	—	—	—	–	—
34	May 2	@ Brewers	—	—	—	—	—	–	—
35	May 3	@ Royals	—	—	—	—	—	–	—
36	May 4	@ Royals	—	—	—	—	—	–	—
37	May 5	@ Royals	—	—	—	—	—	–	—
38	May 6	Rockies	—	—	—	—	—	–	—
39	May 7	Rockies	—	—	—	—	—	–	—
40	May 8	Rockies	—	—	—	—	—	–	—
41	May 9	Rockies	—	—	—	—	—	–	—
42	May 11	Diamondbacks	—	—	—	—	—	–	—
43	May 12	Diamondbacks	—	—	—	—	—	–	—
44	May 13	Diamondbacks	—	—	—	—	—	–	—
45	May 14	@ Padres	—	—	—	—	—	–	—
46	May 15	@ Padres	—	—	—	—	—	–	—
47	May 16	@ Padres	—	—	—	—	—	–	—
48	May 17	@ Dodgers	—	—	—	—	—	–	—
49	May 18	@ Dodgers	—	—	—	—	—	–	—
50	May 19	@ Dodgers	—	—	—	—	—	–	—
51	May 21	Blue Jays	—	—	—	—	—	–	—
52	May 22	Blue Jays	—	—	—	—	—	–	—
53	May 23	Blue Jays	—	—	—	—	—	–	—
54	May 25	Brewers	—	—	—	—	—	–	—
55	May 26	Brewers	—	—	—	—	—	–	—
56	May 27	Brewers	—	—	—	—	—	–	—
57	May 28	@ Giants	—	—	—	—	—	–	—
58	May 29	@ Giants	—	—	—	—	—	–	—
59	May 30	@ Giants	—	—	—	—	—	–	—
60	May 31	@ Diamondbacks	—	—	—	—	—	–	—

June: 0–0 (Home: 0–0; Road: 0–0)

#	Date	Opponent	Score	Win	Loss	Save	Attendance	Record	Streak
61	June 1	@ Diamondbacks	—	—	—	—	—	–	—
62	June 2	@ Diamondbacks	—	—	—	—	—	–	—
63	June 3	@ Athletics	—	—	—	—	—	–	—
64	June 4	@ Athletics	—	—	—	—	—	–	—
65	June 5	@ Athletics	—	—	—	—	—	–	—
66	June 7	Cubs	—	—	—	—	—	–	—
67	June 8	Cubs	—	—	—	—	—	–	—
68	June 9	Cubs	—	—	—	—	—	–	—
69	June 11	Mariners	—	—	—	—	—	–	—
70	June 12	Mariners	—	—	—	—	—	–	—
71	June 13	Mariners	—	—	—	—	—	–	—
72	June 14	@ Cubs	—	—	—	—	—	–	—
73	June 15	@ Cubs	—	—	—	—	—	–	—
74	June 16	@ Cubs	—	—	—	—	—	–	—
75	June 18	@ Cardinals	—	—	—	—	—	–	—
76	June 19	@ Cardinals	—	—	—	—	—	–	—
77	June 20	@ Cardinals	—	—	—	—	—	–	—
78	June 21	@ Angels	—	—	—	—	—	–	—
79	June 22	@ Angels	—	—	—	—	—	–	—
80	June 23	@ Angels	—	—	—	—	—	–	—
81	June 25	Braves	—	—	—	—	—	–	—
82	June 26	Braves	—	—	—	—	—	–	—
83	June 27	Braves	—	—	—	—	—	–	—
84	June 29	White Sox	—	—	—	—	—	–	—
85	June 30	White Sox	—	—	—	—	—	–	—

July: 0–0 (Home: 0–0; Road: 0–0)

#	Date	Opponent	Score	Win	Loss	Save	Attendance	Record	Streak
86	July 1	White Sox	—	—	—	—	—	–	—
87	July 2	Brewers	—	—	—	—	—	–	—
88	July 3	Brewers	—	—	—	—	—	–	—
89	July 4	Brewers	—	—	—	—	—	–	—
90	July 5	Brewers	—	—	—	—	—	–	—
91	July 6	@ Astros	—	—	—	—	—	–	—
92	July 7	@ Astros	—	—	—	—	—	–	—
93	July 8	@ Astros	—	—	—	—	—	–	—
94	July 9	@ Braves	—	—	—	—	—	–	—
95	July 10	@ Braves	—	—	—	—	—	–	—
96	July 11	@ Braves	—	—	—	—	—	–	—
ASG	July 13	AL @ NL	—	—	—	—	—	—	—
97	July 16	Guardians	—	—	—	—	—	–	—
98	July 17	Guardians	—	—	—	—	—	–	—
99	July 18	Guardians	—	—	—	—	—	–	—
100	July 19	Rays	—	—	—	—	—	–	—
101	July 20	Rays	—	—	—	—	—	–	—
102	July 21	Rays	—	—	—	—	—	–	—
103	July 23	@ Tigers	—	—	—	—	—	–	—
104	July 24	@ Tigers	—	—	—	—	—	–	—
105	July 25	@ Tigers	—	—	—	—	—	–	—
106	July 26	@ Cardinals	—	—	—	—	—	–	—
107	July 27	@ Cardinals	—	—	—	—	—	–	—
108	July 28	@ Cardinals	—	—	—	—	—	–	—
109	July 29	@ Cardinals	—	—	—	—	—	–	—
110	July 30	Nationals	—	—	—	—	—	–	—
111	July 31	Nationals	—	—	—	—	—	–	—

August: 0–0 (Home: 0–0; Road: 0–0)

#	Date	Opponent	Score	Win	Loss	Save	Attendance	Record	Streak
112	August 1	Nationals	—	—	—	—	—	–	—
113	August 2	Mets	—	—	—	—	—	–	—
114	August 3	Mets	—	—	—	—	—	–	—
115	August 4	Mets	—	—	—	—	—	–	—
116	August 6	@ Brewers	—	—	—	—	—	–	—
117	August 7	@ Brewers	—	—	—	—	—	–	—
118	August 8	@ Brewers	—	—	—	—	—	–	—
119	August 9	@ Pirates	—	—	—	—	—	–	—
120	August 10	@ Pirates	—	—	—	—	—	–	—
121	August 11	@ Pirates	—	—	—	—	—	–	—
122	August 13	Yankees	—	—	—	—	—	–	—
123	August 14	Yankees	—	—	—	—	—	–	—
124	August 15	Yankees	—	—	—	—	—	–	—
125	August 16	Pirates	—	—	—	—	—	–	—
126	August 17	Pirates	—	—	—	—	—	–	—
127	August 18	Pirates	—	—	—	—	—	–	—
128	August 19	Pirates	—	—	—	—	—	–	—
129	August 20	@ Phillies	—	—	—	—	—	–	—
130	August 21	@ Phillies	—	—	—	—	—	–	—
131	August 22	@ Phillies	—	—	—	—	—	–	—
132	August 23	Dodgers	—	—	—	—	—	–	—
133	August 24	Dodgers	—	—	—	—	—	–	—
134	August 25	Dodgers	—	—	—	—	—	–	—
135	August 27	Padres	—	—	—	—	—	–	—
136	August 28	Padres	—	—	—	—	—	–	—
137	August 29	Padres	—	—	—	—	—	–	—
138	August 30	@ Nationals	—	—	—	—	—	–	—
139	August 31	@ Nationals	—	—	—	—	—	–	—

September: 0–0 (Home: 0–0; Road: 0–0)

#	Date	Opponent	Score	Win	Loss	Save	Attendance	Record	Streak
140	September 1	@ Nationals	—	—	—	—	—	–	—
141	September 3	Cubs	—	—	—	—	—	–	—
142	September 4	Cubs	—	—	—	—	—	–	—
143	September 5	Cubs	—	—	—	—	—	–	—
144	September 6	@ Rockies	—	—	—	—	—	–	—
145	September 7	@ Rockies	—	—	—	—	—	–	—
146	September 8	@ Rockies	—	—	—	—	—	–	—
147	September 9	@ Cubs	—	—	—	—	—	–	—
148	September 10	@ Cubs	—	—	—	—	—	–	—
149	September 11	@ Cubs	—	—	—	—	—	–	—
150	September 12	@ Cubs	—	—	—	—	—	–	—
151	September 14	Phillies	—	—	—	—	—	–	—
152	September 15	Phillies	—	—	—	—	—	–	—
153	September 16	Phillies	—	—	—	—	—	–	—
154	September 17	Cardinals	—	—	—	—	—	–	—
155	September 18	Cardinals	—	—	—	—	—	–	—
156	September 19	Cardinals	—	—	—	—	—	–	—
157	September 21	@ Orioles	—	—	—	—	—	–	—
158	September 22	@ Orioles	—	—	—	—	—	–	—
159	September 23	@ Orioles	—	—	—	—	—	–	—
160	September 24	@ Guardians	—	—	—	—	—	–	—
161	September 25	@ Guardians	—	—	—	—	—	–	—
162	September 26	@ Guardians	—	—	—	—	—	–	—

Source: MLB.com

== Roster ==
Cincinnati Reds 2027 spring training roster
40-man roster		Non-roster invitees	Coaches / other
Pitchers: 41 Andrew Abbott; 70 Tejay Antone; 23 Graham Ashcraft; 26 Chase Burns; -- Duncan Davitt; 74 José Franco; 57 Julian Garcia; 21 Hunter Greene; 40 Nick Lodolo; 25 Rhett Lowder; 78 Zach Maxwell; 62 Zach McCambley; 47 Luis Mey; 61 Chase Petty; 34 Connor Phillips; 64 Tony Santillan; -- Paxton Schultz; -- Chase Solesky; 68 Carson Spiers; 55 Brandon Williamson	Catchers: 60 Will Banfield; 35 Jose Trevino; Infielders: 2 Edwin Arroyo; 46 Juan Brito; 16 Oswaldo Cabrera; 44 Elly De La Cruz; -- Carter Graham; 3 Ke'Bryan Hayes; 9 Matt McLain; 7 Spencer Steer; 27 Sal Stewart; Outfielders: 22 JJ Bleday; 59 Blake Dunn; 38 Carlos Jorge; 4 Noelvi Marte; 17 Dane Myers; 43 Héctor Rodríguez	Outfielders: -- Dominic Fletcher	Manager: 77 Terry Francona; Coaches: 92 Kyle Arnsberg (assistant coach); 45 Freddie Benavides (bench coach/field coordinator); 54 Collin Cowgill (first base); 91 Jose Duarte (bullpen catcher); 99 Willie Harris (third base); 95 James Keller (bullpen catcher); 96 Simon Mathews (assistant pitching); 75 Mike Napoli (staff assistant); 93 Alex Pelaez (assistant hitting); 94 Will Remillard (assistant hitting); 90 Matt Tracy (bullpen); 76 Chris Valaika (hitting); 37 active, 0 inactive, 1 non-roster invitees; 7-, 10-, or 15-day injured list; * Not on active roster; ^{†} Suspended list; Roster, coaches, and NRIs updated November 20, 2026; Transactions • Depth chart; → All MLB rosters

== Farm system ==
Level	Team	League	Manager
AAA	Louisville Bats	International League	
AA	Chattanooga Lookouts	Southern League	
High-A	Dayton Dragons	Midwest League	
Low-A	Daytona Tortugas	Florida State League	
Rookie	ACL Reds	Arizona Complex League	
Foreign Rookie	DSL Reds	Dominican Summer League	
