= Pedro Guerrero (coach) =

Dominican baseball player & coach (born 1988)

Los Angeles Dodgers
- Infielder / Coach
- Born: December 3, 1988 (age 37); San Pedro de Macorís, Dominican Republic
- Bats: Right Throws: Right
- Stats at Baseball Reference

Teams
- As coach: Philadelphia Phillies (2018–2021); San Francisco Giants (2022–2024); Miami Marlins (2025–2026)

Pedro Manuel Guerrero (born December 3, 1988) is a Dominican former professional baseball infielder and current coach. He is the hitting coach for the Los Angeles Dodgers of Major League Baseball (MLB). He is the nephew of former MLB manager and longtime coach, Manny Acta.

== Playing career ==
Guerrero was born in San Pedro de Macoris, Dominican Republic. He played professionally in the Los Angeles Dodgers organization from 2006 through 2013, playing as high as Class A+. He batted .236/.287/.351 with 23 home runs, 29 stolen bases, and 163 RBIs in 1,382 at bats over 411 games. He played 183 games at shortstop, 111 games at third base, 97 games at second base, and two games in left field.

== Coaching career ==
=== Philadelphia Phillies ===
Guerrero was the bench coach for the rookie-league Ogden Raptors from 2016 to 2017, before being hired to be the assistant hitting coach for the Philadelphia Phillies, a role which he held through the 2021 season.

=== San Francisco Giants ===
On November 9, 2021, Guerrero was hired by the San Francisco Giants to serve as the team's assistant hitting coach for the 2022 season.

=== Miami Marlins ===
On November 10, 2024, Guerrero was hired by the Miami Marlins to be their hitting coach, ending his 3-season-long stint with San Francisco. This move to Miami reunited Guerrero with now-Miami assistant general manager Gabe Kapler, who was the Giants manager during the first two out of three years Guerrero spent with the team. After the 2026 season ended, Guerrero left the Marlins.

=== Los Angeles Dodgers ===
Guerrero joined the Los Angeles Dodgers coaching staff as a hitting coach in November 2026, replacing Aaron Bates.
