= 2027 Tampa Bay Rays season =

Major League Baseball season

2027 Tampa Bay Rays
- League: American League
- Division: East
- Ballpark: Tropicana Field
- City: St. Petersburg, Florida
- Owners: Patrick Zalupski
- President of baseball operations: Erik Neander
- Manager: Kevin Cash
- Television: FanDuel Sports Network Sun
- Radio: Tampa Bay Rays Radio Network (English); WGES (Spanish)

The 2027 Tampa Bay Rays season is scheduled to be the 30th season of the Tampa Bay Rays franchise, as members of Major League Baseball's American League East Division. They would enter the season as the defending American League champions, the American League East champions, and runners-up of the 2026 World Series.

The season is contingent on Major League Baseball (MLB) and the Major League Baseball Players Association (MLBPA) signing a new collective bargaining agreement (CBA). Without a new CBA, MLB is expected to lock out the players on December 2, 2026, until one is signed. If such a lockout extends indefinitely, the season could be postponed, shortened, or even cancelled.

== Game log ==
The 2027 schedule is tentative until a new collective bargaining agreement (CBA) is signed between Major League Baseball (MLB) and the Major League Baseball Players Association (MLBPA). If the labor dispute extends into late February or early March, MLB would then start to consider whether to postpone or shorten the season.

=== Regular season ===
Legend
	Rays win
	Rays loss
	Postponement
**Bold**	Rays team member

2027 Game Log: 0–0 (Home: 0–0; Away: 0–0)
March/April: 0–0 (Home: 0–0; Away: 0–0)

#	Date	Opponent	Score	Win	Loss	Save	Venue	Attendance	Record	Streak/ Box
1	March 25	Orioles	—	—	—	—	**Tropicana Field**	—	0–0	—
2	March 26	Orioles	—	—	—	—	**Tropicana Field**	—	0–0	—
3	March 27	Orioles	—	—	—	—	**Tropicana Field**	—	0–0	—
4	March 29	Angels	—	—	—	—	**Tropicana Field**	—	0–0	—
5	March 30	Angels	—	—	—	—	**Tropicana Field**	—	0–0	—
6	March 31	Angels	—	—	—	—	**Tropicana Field**	—	0–0	—
7	April 2	@ Twins	—	—	—	—	Target Field	—	0–0	—
8	April 3	@ Twins	—	—	—	—	Target Field	—	0–0	—
9	April 4	@ Twins	—	—	—	—	Target Field	—	0–0	—
10	April 5	@ Twins	—	—	—	—	Target Field	—	0–0	—
11	April 6	@ Rangers	—	—	—	—	Globe Life Field	—	0–0	—
12	April 7	@ Rangers	—	—	—	—	Globe Life Field	—	0–0	—
13	April 8	@ Rangers	—	—	—	—	Globe Life Field	—	0–0	—
14	April 9	Blue Jays	—	—	—	—	**Tropicana Field**	—	0–0	—
15	April 10	Blue Jays	—	—	—	—	**Tropicana Field**	—	0–0	—
16	April 11	Blue Jays	—	—	—	—	**Tropicana Field**	—	0–0	—
17	April 12	Red Sox	—	—	—	—	**Tropicana Field**	—	0–0	—
18	April 13	Red Sox	—	—	—	—	**Tropicana Field**	—	0–0	—
19	April 14	Red Sox	—	—	—	—	**Tropicana Field**	—	0–0	—
20	April 15	Red Sox	—	—	—	—	**Tropicana Field**	—	0–0	—
21	April 16	@ Royals	—	—	—	—	Kauffman Stadium	—	0–0	—
22	April 17	@ Royals	—	—	—	—	Kauffman Stadium	—	0–0	—
23	April 18	@ Royals	—	—	—	—	Kauffman Stadium	—	0–0	—
24	April 20	@ Red Sox	—	—	—	—	Fenway Park	—	0–0	—
25	April 21	@ Red Sox	—	—	—	—	Fenway Park	—	0–0	—
26	April 22	@ Red Sox	—	—	—	—	Fenway Park	—	0–0	—
27	April 23	Braves	—	—	—	—	**Tropicana Field**	—	0–0	—
28	April 24	Braves	—	—	—	—	**Tropicana Field**	—	0–0	—
29	April 25	Braves	—	—	—	—	**Tropicana Field**	—	0–0	—
30	April 27	Pirates	—	—	—	—	**Tropicana Field**	—	0–0	—
31	April 28	Pirates	—	—	—	—	**Tropicana Field**	—	0–0	—
32	April 29	Pirates	—	—	—	—	**Tropicana Field**	—	0–0	—
33	April 30	@ Blue Jays	—	—	—	—	Rogers Centre	—	0–0	—

May: 0–0 (Home: 0–0; Away: 0–0)

#	Date	Opponent	Score	Win	Loss	Save	Stadium	Attendance	Record	Streak/ Box
34	May 1	@ Blue Jays	—	—	—	—	Rogers Centre	—	0–0	—
35	May 2	@ Blue Jays	—	—	—	—	Rogers Centre	—	0–0	—
36	May 3	@ Yankees	—	—	—	—	Yankee Stadium	—	0–0	—
37	May 4	@ Yankees	—	—	—	—	Yankee Stadium	—	0–0	—
38	May 5	@ Yankees	—	—	—	—	Yankee Stadium	—	0–0	—
39	May 6	@ Yankees	—	—	—	—	Yankee Stadium	—	0–0	—
40	May 7	@ Mets	—	—	—	—	Citi Field	—	0–0	—
41	May 8	@ Mets	—	—	—	—	Citi Field	—	0–0	—
42	May 9	@ Mets	—	—	—	—	Citi Field	—	0–0	—
43	May 11	White Sox	—	—	—	—	**Tropicana Field**	—	0–0	—
44	May 12	White Sox	—	—	—	—	**Tropicana Field**	—	0–0	—
45	May 13	White Sox	—	—	—	—	**Tropicana Field**	—	0–0	—
46	May 14	Cardinals	—	—	—	—	**Tropicana Field**	—	0–0	—
47	May 15	Cardinals	—	—	—	—	**Tropicana Field**	—	0–0	—
48	May 16	Cardinals	—	—	—	—	**Tropicana Field**	—	0–0	—
49	May 17	@ Astros	—	—	—	—	Daikin Park	—	0–0	—
50	May 18	@ Astros	—	—	—	—	Daikin Park	—	0–0	—
51	May 19	@ Astros	—	—	—	—	Daikin Park	—	0–0	—
52	May 21	@ Mariners	—	—	—	—	T-Mobile Park	—	0–0	—
53	May 22	@ Mariners	—	—	—	—	T-Mobile Park	—	0–0	—
54	May 23	@ Mariners	—	—	—	—	T-Mobile Park	—	0–0	—
55	May 25	Phillies	—	—	—	—	**Tropicana Field**	—	0–0	—
56	May 26	Phillies	—	—	—	—	**Tropicana Field**	—	0–0	—
57	May 27	Phillies	—	—	—	—	**Tropicana Field**	—	0–0	—
58	May 28	Guardians	—	—	—	—	**Tropicana Field**	—	0–0	—
59	May 29	Guardians	—	—	—	—	**Tropicana Field**	—	0–0	—
60	May 30	Guardians	—	—	—	—	**Tropicana Field**	—	0–0	—
61	May 31	@ White Sox	—	—	—	—	Rate Field	—	0–0	—

June: 0–0 (Home: 0–0; Away: 0–0)

#	Date	Opponent	Score	Win	Loss	Save	Stadium	Attendance	Record	Streak/ Box
62	June 1	@ White Sox	—	—	—	—	Rate Field	—	0–0	—
63	June 2	@ White Sox	—	—	—	—	Rate Field	—	0–0	—
64	June 4	Astros	—	—	—	—	**Tropicana Field**	—	0–0	—
65	June 5	Astros	—	—	—	—	**Tropicana Field**	—	0–0	—
66	June 6	Astros	—	—	—	—	**Tropicana Field**	—	0–0	—
67	June 8	@ Nationals	—	—	—	—	Nationals Park	—	0–0	—
68	June 9	@ Nationals	—	—	—	—	Nationals Park	—	0–0	—
69	June 10	@ Nationals	—	—	—	—	Nationals Park	—	0–0	—
70	June 11	@ Orioles	—	—	—	—	Camden Yards	—	0–0	—
71	June 12	@ Orioles	—	—	—	—	Camden Yards	—	0–0	—
72	June 13	@ Orioles	—	—	—	—	Camden Yards	—	0–0	—
73	June 14	@ Orioles	—	—	—	—	Camden Yards	—	0–0	—
74	June 15	Yankees	—	—	—	—	**Tropicana Field**	—	0–0	—
75	June 16	Yankees	—	—	—	—	**Tropicana Field**	—	0–0	—
76	June 17	Yankees	—	—	—	—	**Tropicana Field**	—	0–0	—
77	June 18	Brewers	—	—	—	—	**Tropicana Field**	—	0–0	—
78	June 19	Brewers	—	—	—	—	**Tropicana Field**	—	0–0	—
79	June 20	Brewers	—	—	—	—	**Tropicana Field**	—	0–0	—
80	June 22	Dodgers	—	—	—	—	**Tropicana Field**	—	0–0	—
81	June 23	Dodgers	—	—	—	—	**Tropicana Field**	—	0–0	—
82	June 24	Dodgers	—	—	—	—	**Tropicana Field**	—	0–0	—
83	June 25	@ Angels	—	—	—	—	Angel Stadium	—	0–0	—
84	June 26	@ Angels	—	—	—	—	Angel Stadium	—	0–0	—
85	June 27	@ Angels	—	—	—	—	Angel Stadium	—	0–0	—
86	June 28	@ Giants	—	—	—	—	Oracle Park	—	0–0	—
87	June 29	@ Giants	—	—	—	—	Oracle Park	—	0–0	—
88	June 30	@ Giants	—	—	—	—	Oracle Park	—	0–0	—

July: 0–0 (Home: 0–0; Away: 0–0)

#	Date	Opponent	Score	Win	Loss	Save	Stadium	Attendance	Record	Streak/ Box
89	July 2	@ Padres	—	—	—	—	Petco Park	—	0–0	—
90	July 3	@ Padres	—	—	—	—	Petco Park	—	0–0	—
91	July 4	@ Padres	—	—	—	—	Petco Park	—	0–0	—
92	July 6	Red Sox	—	—	—	—	**Tropicana Field**	—	0–0	—
93	July 7	Red Sox	—	—	—	—	**Tropicana Field**	—	0–0	—
94	July 8	Red Sox	—	—	—	—	**Tropicana Field**	—	0–0	—
95	July 9	Orioles	—	—	—	—	**Tropicana Field**	—	0–0	—
96	July 10	Orioles	—	—	—	—	**Tropicana Field**	—	0–0	—
97	July 11	Orioles	—	—	—	—	**Tropicana Field**	—	0–0	—
–	July 13	**97th All-Star Game in Chicago, IL**								
98	July 16	@ Marlins	—	—	—	—	LoanDepot Park	—	0–0	—
99	July 17	@ Marlins	—	—	—	—	LoanDepot Park	—	0–0	—
100	July 18	@ Marlins	—	—	—	—	LoanDepot Park	—	0–0	—
101	July 19	@ Reds	—	—	—	—	Great American Ball Park	—	0–0	—
102	July 20	@ Reds	—	—	—	—	Great American Ball Park	—	0–0	—
103	July 21	@ Reds	—	—	—	—	Great American Ball Park	—	0–0	—
104	July 23	Royals	—	—	—	—	**Tropicana Field**	—	0–0	—
105	July 24	Royals	—	—	—	—	**Tropicana Field**	—	0–0	—
106	July 25	Royals	—	—	—	—	**Tropicana Field**	—	0–0	—
107	July 26	Rangers	—	—	—	—	**Tropicana Field**	—	0–0	—
108	July 27	Rangers	—	—	—	—	**Tropicana Field**	—	0–0	—
109	July 28	Rangers	—	—	—	—	**Tropicana Field**	—	0–0	—
110	July 29	Rangers	—	—	—	—	**Tropicana Field**	—	0–0	—
111	July 30	@ Athletics	—	—	—	—	Sutter Health Park	—	0–0	—
112	July 31	@ Athletics	—	—	—	—	Sutter Health Park	—	0–0	—

August: 0–0 (Home: 0–0; Away: 0–0)

#	Date	Opponent	Score	Win	Loss	Save	Stadium	Attendance	Record	Streak/ Box
113	August 1	@ Athletics	—	—	—	—	Sutter Health Park	—	0–0	—
114	August 2	@ Diamondbacks	—	—	—	—	Chase Field	—	0–0	—
115	August 3	@ Diamondbacks	—	—	—	—	Chase Field	—	0–0	—
116	August 4	@ Diamondbacks	—	—	—	—	Chase Field	—	0–0	—
117	August 6	Mariners	—	—	—	—	**Tropicana Field**	—	0–0	—
118	August 7	Mariners	—	—	—	—	**Tropicana Field**	—	0–0	—
119	August 8	Mariners	—	—	—	—	**Tropicana Field**	—	0–0	—
120	August 9	Yankees	—	—	—	—	**Tropicana Field**	—	0–0	—
121	August 10	Yankees	—	—	—	—	**Tropicana Field**	—	0–0	—
122	August 11	Yankees	—	—	—	—	**Tropicana Field**	—	0–0	—
123	August 13	@ Cubs	—	—	—	—	Wrigley Field	—	0–0	—
124	August 14	@ Cubs	—	—	—	—	Wrigley Field	—	0–0	—
125	August 15	@ Cubs	—	—	—	—	Wrigley Field	—	0–0	—
126	August 17	@ Tigers	—	—	—	—	Fifth Third Park	—	0–0	—
127	August 18	@ Tigers	—	—	—	—	Fifth Third Park	—	0–0	—
128	August 19	@ Tigers	—	—	—	—	Fifth Third Park	—	0–0	—
129	August 20	@ Guardians	—	—	—	—	Progressive Field	—	0–0	—
130	August 21	@ Guardians	—	—	—	—	Progressive Field	—	0–0	—
131	August 22	@ Guardians	—	—	—	—	Progressive Field	—	0–0	—
132	August 24	Tigers	—	—	—	—	**Tropicana Field**	—	0–0	—
133	August 25	Tigers	—	—	—	—	**Tropicana Field**	—	0–0	—
134	August 26	Tigers	—	—	—	—	**Tropicana Field**	—	0–0	—
135	August 27	Twins	—	—	—	—	**Tropicana Field**	—	0–0	—
136	August 28	Twins	—	—	—	—	**Tropicana Field**	—	0–0	—
137	August 29	Twins	—	—	—	—	**Tropicana Field**	—	0–0	—
138	August 30	Blue Jays	—	—	—	—	**Tropicana Field**	—	0–0	—
139	August 31	Blue Jays	—	—	—	—	**Tropicana Field**	—	0–0	—

September: 0–0 (Home: 0–0; Away: 0–0)

#	Date	Opponent	Score	Win	Loss	Save	Stadium	Attendance	Record	Streak/ Box
140	September 1	Blue Jays	—	—	—	—	**Tropicana Field**	—	0–0	—
141	September 2	Blue Jays	—	—	—	—	**Tropicana Field**	—	0–0	—
142	September 3	@ Yankees	—	—	—	—	Yankee Stadium	—	0–0	—
143	September 4	@ Yankees	—	—	—	—	Yankee Stadium	—	0–0	—
144	September 5	@ Yankees	—	—	—	—	Yankee Stadium	—	0–0	—
145	September 6	@ Orioles	—	—	—	—	Camden Yards	—	0–0	—
146	September 7	@ Orioles	—	—	—	—	Camden Yards	—	0–0	—
147	September 8	@ Orioles	—	—	—	—	Camden Yards	—	0–0	—
148	September 10	Marlins	—	—	—	—	**Tropicana Field**	—	0–0	—
149	September 11	Marlins	—	—	—	—	**Tropicana Field**	—	0–0	—
150	September 12	Marlins	—	—	—	—	**Tropicana Field**	—	0–0	—
151	September 14	Athletics	—	—	—	—	**Tropicana Field**	—	0–0	—
152	September 15	Athletics	—	—	—	—	**Tropicana Field**	—	0–0	—
153	September 16	Athletics	—	—	—	—	**Tropicana Field**	—	0–0	—
154	September 17	Rockies	—	—	—	—	**Tropicana Field**	—	0–0	—
155	September 18	Rockies	—	—	—	—	**Tropicana Field**	—	0–0	—
156	September 19	Rockies	—	—	—	—	**Tropicana Field**	—	0–0	—
157	September 21	@ Red Sox	—	—	—	—	Fenway Park	—	0–0	—
158	September 22	@ Red Sox	—	—	—	—	Fenway Park	—	0–0	—
159	September 23	@ Red Sox	—	—	—	—	Fenway Park	—	0–0	—
160	September 24	@ Blue Jays	—	—	—	—	Rogers Centre	—	0–0	—
161	September 25	@ Blue Jays	—	—	—	—	Rogers Centre	—	0–0	—
162	September 26	@ Blue Jays	—	—	—	—	Rogers Centre	—	0–0	—

== Current roster ==
Tampa Bay Rays 2027 spring training roster
40-man roster		Non-roster invitees	Coaches / other
Pitchers: -- Alexander Alberto; 47 Bryan Baker; 62 Cam Booser; 36 Joe Boyle; 60 Garrett Cleavinger; 54 Alex Cook; 59 Mason Englert; 88 Brody Hopkins; 22 Griffin Jax; 55 Ty Johnson; 49 Kevin Kelly; 67 Casey Legumina; 32 Steven Matz; 18 Shane McClanahan; 44 Ryan Pepiot; 57 Drew Rasmussen; 39 Manuel Rodríguez; 61 Ian Seymour; 63 Edwin Uceta; 68 Tyler Wells	Catchers: 34 Liam Hicks; 50 Kenny Piper; Infielders: 8 Jonathan Aranda; 45 Jadher Areinamo; 13 Junior Caminero; -- Xavier Isaac; -- Christian Koss; 1 Richie Palacios; 6 Taylor Walls; 7 Carson Williams; 15 Ben Williamson; Outfielders: 21 Jonny DeLuca; 29 Jacob Melton; 25 Víctor Mesa Jr.; 14 Chandler Simpson; -- Jack Suwinski; 26 Ryan Vilade; Designated hitters: 2 Yandy Díaz	Pitchers: -- Levi Stoudt; -- Kodi Whitley	Manager: 16 Kevin Cash; Coaches: 46 Will Bradley (assistant hitting); 10 Corey Dickerson (first base); 99 Misha Dworken (bullpen catcher); 41 Tomas Francisco (field coordinator); -- Kris Goodman (process and development); 52 Rick Knapp (assistant pitching and rehab); 27 Rodney Linares (bench); 33 Jorge Moncada (bullpen); 51 Chad Mottola (hitting); 23 Kyle Snyder (pitching); 30 Ozzie Timmons (assistant hitting); 96 Charlie Valerio (bullpen catcher); 4 Brady Williams (third base); Restricted list: 5 Wander Franco; 38 active, 0 inactive, 2 non-roster invitees; 7-, 10-, or 15-day injured list; * Not on active roster; ^{†} Suspended list; Roster, coaches, and NRIs updated November 20, 2026; Transactions • Depth chart; → All MLB rosters

== Farm system ==
Level	Team	League	Manager
AAA	Durham Bulls	International League	
AA	Montgomery Biscuits	Southern League	
High-A	Bowling Green Hot Rods	South Atlantic League	
A	Charleston RiverDogs	Carolina League	
Rookie	FCL Rays	Florida Complex League	
Foreign Rookie	DSL Rays 1	Dominican Summer League	
Foreign Rookie	DSL Rays 2	Dominican Summer League	
