= Calvary Christian High School (Florida) =

High school in Florida

Location
- 110 North McMullen Booth Road; Clearwater, Florida 33759; United States; 27°57′59″N 82°42′35″W

Information
- Opened: 2000
- Head of School: David Kilgore
- Colors: Navy, white, and gray
- Mascot: Warrior
- Website: cchs.us

Calvary Christian High School is a private, college preparatory Christian high school in Clearwater, Florida, in the United States.

== Notable alumni ==
- Christian Cairo (2019), baseball player in the Cleveland Guardians organization
- Matheu Nelson, 1st Round Pick in the 2021 Major League Baseball draft by the Cincinnati Reds
- Tommy White (2021 - transferred), baseball player in the Athletics organization
