= Christian Cairo =

American baseball player (born 2001)

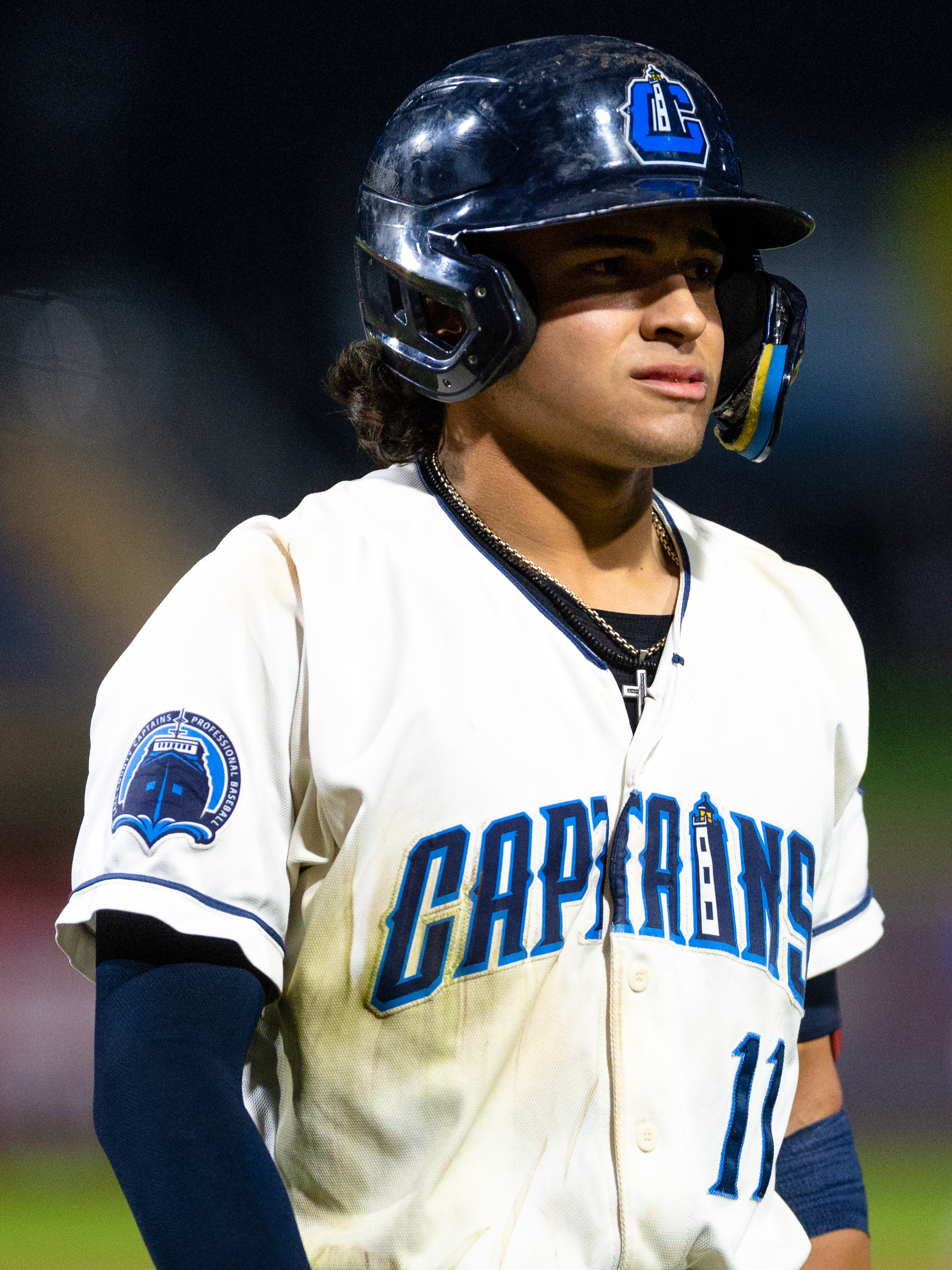
- Cairo with the Lake County Captains in 2022

Toronto Blue Jays
- Infielder
- Born: June 11, 2001 (age 25); Bakersfield, California, U.S.
- Bats: Right Throws: Right
Medals
Men's baseball
Representing United States
U-15 Baseball World Cup
| Bronze medal – third place | 2016 Iwaki | Team |

Christian Miguel Cairo (born June 11, 2001) is an American professional baseball infielder for the Toronto Blue Jays of Major League Baseball (MLB).

== Career ==
=== Cleveland Guardians ===
Cairo attended Calvary Christian High School in Clearwater, Florida. The Cleveland Indians drafted him in the fourth round, with the 130th overall selection, of the 2019 Major League Baseball draft. At the time of his selection, MLB.com ranked Cairo 99th on the draft prospect list. Though he was prepared to follow through on his commitment to play college baseball for Louisiana State University, Cleveland signed him for a signing bonus reportedly close to $1 million. He made his professional debut with the rookie–level Arizona League Indians. Cairo did not play in a game in 2020 due to the cancellation of the minor league season because of the COVID-19 pandemic.

Cairo returned to action in 2021 with the Single–A Lynchburg Hillcats and High–A Lake County Captains. In 79 games split between the two affiliates, he slashed .226/.371/.357 with six home runs, 24 RBI, and 19 stolen bases. Cairo split the 2022 campaign between the rookie–level Arizona Complex League Guardians and Lake County, playing in 63 games and hitting .198/.362/.277 with two home runs, 21 RBI, and 10 stolen bases.

Cairo returned to Lake County in 2023, playing in 61 games and batting .239/.376/.351 with three home runs, 13 RBI, and 10 stolen bases. In 2023, he played in the Arizona Fall League with the Peoria Javelinas. Cairo split 2024 between the Double–A Akron RubberDucks and Triple–A Columbus Clippers. In 108 appearances split between the two affiliates, he slashed .241/.354/.326 with four home runs, 39 RBI, and 26 stolen bases.

On December 11, 2024, the Atlanta Braves selected Cairo from Cleveland in the Rule 5 draft. On March 19, 2025, Cairo was returned to the Guardians organization. He made 112 appearances for Triple-A Columbus, slashing .237/.338/.331 with two home runs, 28 RBI, and 33 stolen bases. Cairo elected free agency following the season on November 6.

=== Philadelphia Phillies ===
On December 19, 2025, Cairo signed a minor league contract with the Philadelphia Phillies. On March 25, 2026, the Phillies selected Cairo's contract and subsequently optioned him to the Triple-A Lehigh Valley IronPigs. He made 128 appearances for Lehigh Valley, slashing .227/.378/.298 with four home runs, 35 RBI, and 25 stolen bases. Cairo was designated for assignment by the Phillies on September 13.

=== New York Mets ===
On September 15, 2026, Cairo was claimed off of waivers by the New York Mets. He made two appearances for the Triple–A Syracuse Mets, going 3–for–7 (.429) with one RBI and two walks.

On November 2, 2026, Cairo re–signed with the Mets on a one–year, split major league contract. However, he was designated for assignment by New York the same day.

=== Toronto Blue Jays ===
On November 9, 2026, Cairo was claimed off waivers by the Los Angeles Dodgers. They then designated him for assignment on November 17. Two days later he was claimed off waivers by the Toronto Blue Jays.

== Personal life ==
Cairo's father, Miguel Cairo, played in the major leagues for 17 years and later became a coach and manager.

== See also ==
- Rule 5 draft results
