= Aaron Bates =

American baseball player and coach (born 1984)

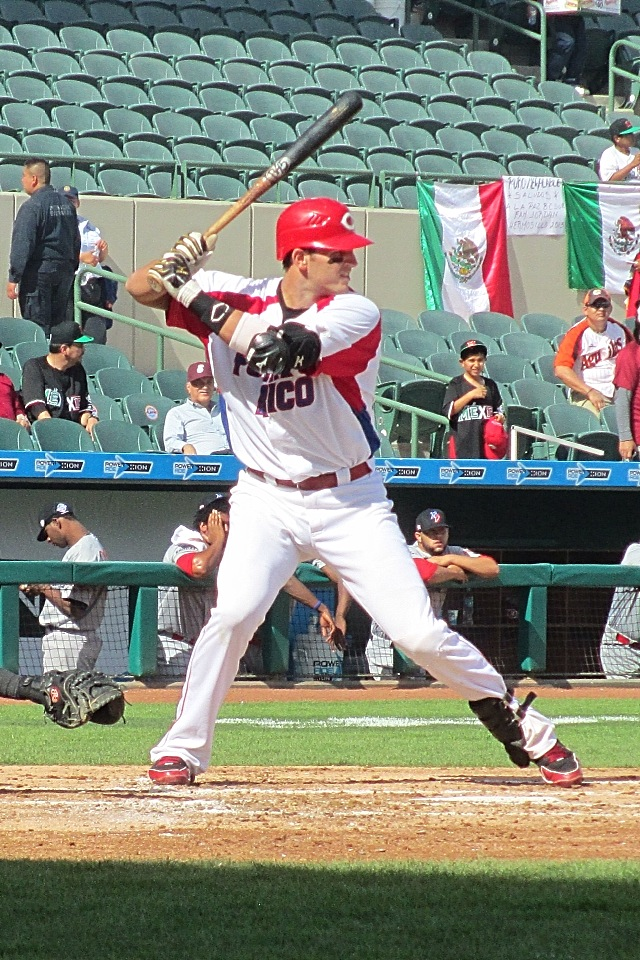
- Bates playing for Puerto Rico at the 2013 Caribbean Series
- Hitting coach / First baseman
- Born: March 10, 1984 (age 42); Manhattan, New York, U.S.
- Batted: Right Threw: Right

MLB debut
- July 6, 2009, for the Boston Red Sox

Last MLB appearance
- July 12, 2009, for the Boston Red Sox

MLB statistics
- Batting average: .364
- Home runs: 0
- Runs batted in: 2
- Stats at Baseball Reference

Teams
- As player: Boston Red Sox (2009); As coach: Los Angeles Dodgers (2019–2026)

Career highlights and awards
- 3× World Series champion (2020, 2024, 2025)

Aaron Bates (born March 10, 1984) is an American former professional baseball first baseman. He played in Major League Baseball for the Boston Red Sox in 2009 and was a hitting coach for the Los Angeles Dodgers from 2019 through 2026.

== College career ==
=== NCAA ===
Bates played college baseball for both the NC State Wolfpack and the San Jose State Spartans. He was a freshman All American for the San Jose State Spartans and twice named All American for the NC State Wolfpack. His best year was in 2005, when he had arguably the greatest offensive season in Wolfpack history, hitting .425-12-64 and was drafted in the 8th round by the Florida Marlins. However, he returned to school for his junior season and hit .356-10-56. He was selected by the Boston Red Sox in 2006.

=== Collegiate summer ===
Bates played in the Cape Cod Baseball League for the Brewster Whitecaps in the summer of 2005. He was named a Cape Cod League All Star alongside future MLB stars Evan Longoria, Justin Masterson, Daniel Bard and Chris Coghlan. Bates also won the 2005 All Star game Home Run Derby.

== Professional career ==
=== Boston Red Sox ===
The Boston Red Sox selected Bates in the third round of the 2006 Major League Baseball draft. His first professional season was split between the Lowell Spinners and Greenville Drive. In 2007, he began the year with the Lancaster JetHawks before being promoted to the AA Portland Sea Dogs. He played with Sea Dogs until June 2009. In May 2009, he was the Eastern League Player of the Month while playing with the Sea Dogs. He was promoted to AAA Pawtucket Red Sox.

On July 6, 2009, Bates was called up to the Red Sox to play at first base after Jeff Bailey injured his ankle in a game two days before. Bates had four hits in 11 at-bats with the Red Sox, with his first hit being an RBI single to center field off Román Colón of the Kansas City Royals.

On July 26, 2010, the Red Sox outrighted Bates to Pawtucket, thus removing him from the 40-man roster.

In March 2011 he was released by the Red Sox.

=== Minnesota Twins ===
On May 8, 2011, Bates was signed by the Minnesota Twins to a minor league contract and sent to Rochester of the International League. He finished 3rd in International League in batting average, .316, and led the league in on-base percentage at .408. Bates then re-signed with the Minnesota Twins for the 2012 season, before declaring free agency. In spring training 2012, he hit .400 (8-20) with the Major League Team, but was sent to the AAA Rochester Red Wings of the International League to start the season.

Bates was released by the Twins on May 15, 2012, due to the subsequent demotions of Twins 3rd baseman Danny Valencia, MLB veteran Sean Burroughs and rising star Chris Parmelee.

=== St. Louis Cardinals ===
On May 22, 2012, Bates signed a minor league deal with the St. Louis Cardinals. He was subsequently released by the Cardinals at the end of July 2012 and signed with the Sugar Land Skeeters of the Atlantic League of Professional Baseball.

=== Los Angeles Dodgers ===
On January 29, 2014, he signed a minor league contract with the Los Angeles Dodgers and was assigned to the AA Chattanooga Lookouts. He spent most of the season on the disabled list and only played in 11 games, hitting .176.

== Winter leagues ==
Bates played in the Liga de Béisbol Profesional Roberto Clemente from 2008 to 2013. He played for the Leones de Ponce in the winter of 2008, before being traded to the Criollos de Caguas. The Criollos played in the LBPRC championship series all four years he played with them, winning championships in 2011 and 2013. In 2011, Bates played with Criollos in the 2011 Caribbean Series, hitting .333 over the course of six games. It was held in Mayagüez, Puerto Rico, and the team finished tied for 2nd with the Dominican Republic. Bates most recently played in the 2013 Caribbean Series, which took place in Hermosillo, Mexico, hitting .333 (2 for 6).

Bates's grandparents are from Ponce, Puerto Rico, thus allowing him to play as domestic in the Liga de Béisbol Profesional Roberto Clemente.

== Coaching career ==
Bates retired from playing to become an assistant coach for the Dodgers rookie class Arizona League Dodgers team in 2015. In 2017, he was named hitting coach of the single-A Great Lakes Loons. He spent 2018 as a minor league coordinator before being named as the Dodgers' Major League assistant hitting coach for the 2019 season. He was promoted to co-hitting coach for the 2023 season and remained with the team through the 2026 season.

== Personal life ==
Bates grew up in the small coastal town of Santa Cruz, California. He attended Soquel High School for his freshman year, before transferring to Archbishop Mitty High School in San Jose, California, where he played both football and baseball. His senior season he was the quarterback on the football team, which went 12-1 and captured its first West Catholic Athletic League title in 25 years.

He was inducted into the Archbishop Mitty High School Hall of Fame in January 2013.
