= 2027 Cleveland Guardians season =

2027 Cleveland Guardians
- League: American League
- Division: Central
- Ballpark: Progressive Field
- City: Cleveland, Ohio
- Owners: Paul Dolan
- President of baseball operations: Chris Antonetti
- General managers: Mike Chernoff
- Manager: Stephen Vogt
- Television: MLB Local Media (Matt Underwood, Rick Manning, Chris Gimenez, Andre Knott, Al Pawlowski, Jensen Lewis, Pat Tabler)
- Radio: English: WTAM · WMMS (Tom Hamilton, Jim Rosenhaus, Tim Belcher, Charles Nagy, Pat Tabler); Spanish: WARF (Rafa Hernández-Brito, Carlos Baerga)

The 2027 Cleveland Guardians season is scheduled to be the 127th season for the franchise, which competes in the American League of Major League Baseball (MLB).

The season is contingent on Major League Baseball (MLB) and the Major League Baseball Players Association (MLBPA) signing a new collective bargaining agreement (CBA). Without a new CBA, MLB is expected to lock out the players on December 2, 2026, until one is signed. If such a lockout extends indefinitely, the season could be postponed, shortened, or even cancelled.

== Game log ==
The 2027 schedule is tentative until a new collective bargaining agreement (CBA) is signed between Major League Baseball (MLB) and the Major League Baseball Players Association (MLBPA). If the labor dispute extends into late February or early March, MLB would then start to consider whether to postpone or shorten the season.

2027 Game Log: 0–0 (Home: 0–0; Road: 0–0)
March/April: 0–0 (Home: 0–0; Road: 0–0)

#	Date	Opponent	Score	Win	Loss	Save	Attendance	Record	Streak
1	March 25	@ Cubs	—	—	—	—	—	0–0	—
2	March 27	@ Cubs	—	—	—	—	—	0–0	—
3	March 28	@ Cubs	—	—	—	—	—	0–0	—
4	March 29	@ Tigers	—	—	—	—	—	0–0	—
5	March 30	@ Tigers	—	—	—	—	—	0–0	—
6	March 31	@ Tigers	—	—	—	—	—	0–0	—
7	April 1	Yankees	—	—	—	—	—	0–0	—
8	April 2	Yankees	—	—	—	—	—	0–0	—
9	April 3	Yankees	—	—	—	—	—	0–0	—
10	April 4	Yankees	—	—	—	—	—	0–0	—
11	April 5	Mariners	—	—	—	—	—	0–0	—
12	April 6	Mariners	—	—	—	—	—	0–0	—
13	April 7	Mariners	—	—	—	—	—	0–0	—
14	April 9	@ Astros	—	—	—	—	—	0–0	—
15	April 10	@ Astros	—	—	—	—	—	0–0	—
16	April 11	@ Astros	—	—	—	—	—	0–0	—
17	April 13	Twins	—	—	—	—	—	0–0	—
18	April 14	Twins	—	—	—	—	—	0–0	—
19	April 15	Twins	—	—	—	—	—	0–0	—
20	April 16	@ Red Sox	—	—	—	—	—	0–0	—
21	April 17	@ Red Sox	—	—	—	—	—	0–0	—
22	April 18	@ Red Sox	—	—	—	—	—	0–0	—
23	April 19	@ Red Sox	—	—	—	—	—	0–0	—
24	April 20	@ Blue Jays	—	—	—	—	—	0–0	—
25	April 21	@ Blue Jays	—	—	—	—	—	0–0	—
26	April 22	@ Blue Jays	—	—	—	—	—	0–0	—
27	April 23	Royals	—	—	—	—	—	0–0	—
28	April 24	Royals	—	—	—	—	—	0–0	—
29	April 25	Royals	—	—	—	—	—	0–0	—
30	April 26	Rockies	—	—	—	—	—	0–0	—
31	April 27	Rockies	—	—	—	—	—	0–0	—
32	April 28	Rockies	—	—	—	—	—	0–0	—
33	April 30	@ Diamondbacks	—	—	—	—	—	0–0	—

May: 0–0 (Home: 0–0; Road: 0–0)

#	Date	Opponent	Score	Win	Loss	Save	Attendance	Record	Streak
34	May 1	@ Diamondbacks	—	—	—	—	—	0–0	—
35	May 2	@ Diamondbacks	—	—	—	—	—	0–0	—
36	May 3	@ Athletics	—	—	—	—	—	0–0	—
37	May 4	@ Athletics	—	—	—	—	—	0–0	—
38	May 5	@ Athletics	—	—	—	—	—	0–0	—
39	May 7	Red Sox	—	—	—	—	—	0–0	—
40	May 8	Red Sox	—	—	—	—	—	0–0	—
41	May 9	Red Sox	—	—	—	—	—	0–0	—
42	May 11	Dodgers	—	—	—	—	—	0–0	—
43	May 12	Dodgers	—	—	—	—	—	0–0	—
44	May 13	Dodgers	—	—	—	—	—	0–0	—
45	May 14	@ Nationals	—	—	—	—	—	0–0	—
46	May 15	@ Nationals	—	—	—	—	—	0–0	—
47	May 16	@ Nationals	—	—	—	—	—	0–0	—
48	May 17	@ White Sox	—	—	—	—	—	0–0	—
49	May 18	@ White Sox	—	—	—	—	—	0–0	—
50	May 19	@ White Sox	—	—	—	—	—	0–0	—
51	May 21	Orioles	—	—	—	—	—	0–0	—
52	May 22	Orioles	—	—	—	—	—	0–0	—
53	May 23	Orioles	—	—	—	—	—	0–0	—
54	May 24	Angels	—	—	—	—	—	0–0	—
55	May 25	Angels	—	—	—	—	—	0–0	—
56	May 26	Angels	—	—	—	—	—	0–0	—
57	May 28	@ Rays	—	—	—	—	—	0–0	—
58	May 29	@ Rays	—	—	—	—	—	0–0	—
59	May 30	@ Rays	—	—	—	—	—	0–0	—
60	May 31	@ Rangers	—	—	—	—	—	0–0	—

June: 0–0 (Home: 0–0; Road: 0–0)

#	Date	Opponent	Score	Win	Loss	Save	Attendance	Record	Streak
61	June 1	@ Rangers	—	—	—	—	—	0–0	—
62	June 2	@ Rangers	—	—	—	—	—	0–0	—
63	June 4	White Sox	—	—	—	—	—	0–0	—
64	June 5	White Sox	—	—	—	—	—	0–0	—
65	June 6	White Sox	—	—	—	—	—	0–0	—
66	June 7	Tigers	—	—	—	—	—	0–0	—
67	June 8	Tigers	—	—	—	—	—	0–0	—
68	June 9	Tigers	—	—	—	—	—	0–0	—
69	June 10	Tigers	—	—	—	—	—	0–0	—
70	June 11	@ Royals	—	—	—	—	—	0–0	—
71	June 12	@ Royals	—	—	—	—	—	0–0	—
72	June 13	@ Royals	—	—	—	—	—	0–0	—
73	June 15	@ Orioles	—	—	—	—	—	0–0	—
74	June 16	@ Orioles	—	—	—	—	—	0–0	—
75	June 17	@ Orioles	—	—	—	—	—	0–0	—
76	June 18	Athletics	—	—	—	—	—	0–0	—
77	June 19	Athletics	—	—	—	—	—	0–0	—
78	June 20	Athletics	—	—	—	—	—	0–0	—
79	June 21	Astros	—	—	—	—	—	0–0	—
80	June 22	Astros	—	—	—	—	—	0–0	—
81	June 23	Astros	—	—	—	—	—	0–0	—
82	June 24	@ Twins	—	—	—	—	—	0–0	—
83	June 25	@ Twins	—	—	—	—	—	0–0	—
84	June 26	@ Twins	—	—	—	—	—	0–0	—
85	June 27	@ Twins	—	—	—	—	—	0–0	—
86	June 29	@ Tigers	—	—	—	—	—	0–0	—
87	June 30	@ Tigers	—	—	—	—	—	0–0	—

July: 0–0 (Home: 0–0; Road: 0–0)

#	Date	Opponent	Score	Win	Loss	Save	Attendance	Record	Streak
88	July 1	@ Tigers	—	—	—	—	—	0–0	—
89	July 2	Twins	—	—	—	—	—	0–0	—
90	July 3	Twins	—	—	—	—	—	0–0	—
91	July 4	Twins	—	—	—	—	—	0–0	—
92	July 5	Phillies	—	—	—	—	—	0–0	—
93	July 6	Phillies	—	—	—	—	—	0–0	—
94	July 7	Phillies	—	—	—	—	—	0–0	—
95	July 9	Brewers	—	—	—	—	—	0–0	—
96	July 10	Brewers	—	—	—	—	—	0–0	—
97	July 11	Brewers	—	—	—	—	—	0–0	—
97th All-Star Game: Chicago, IL
98	July 16	@ Reds	—	—	—	—	—	0–0	—
99	July 17	@ Reds	—	—	—	—	—	0–0	—
100	July 18	@ Reds	—	—	—	—	—	0–0	—
101	July 19	@ Yankees	—	—	—	—	—	0–0	—
102	July 20	@ Yankees	—	—	—	—	—	0–0	—
103	July 21	@ Yankees	—	—	—	—	—	0–0	—
104	July 23	@ White Sox	—	—	—	—	—	0–0	—
105	July 24	@ White Sox	—	—	—	—	—	0–0	—
106	July 25	@ White Sox	—	—	—	—	—	0–0	—
107	July 26	Marlins	—	—	—	—	—	0–0	—
108	July 27	Marlins	—	—	—	—	—	0–0	—
109	July 28	Marlins	—	—	—	—	—	0–0	—
110	July 29	White Sox	—	—	—	—	—	0–0	—
111	July 30	White Sox	—	—	—	—	—	0–0	—
112	July 31	White Sox	—	—	—	—	—	0–0	—

August: 0–0 (Home: 0–0; Road: 0–0)

#	Date	Opponent	Score	Win	Loss	Save	Attendance	Record	Streak
113	August 1	White Sox	—	—	—	—	—	0–0	—
114	August 3	Rangers	—	—	—	—	—	0–0	—
115	August 4	Rangers	—	—	—	—	—	0–0	—
116	August 5	Rangers	—	—	—	—	—	0–0	—
117	August 6	@ Twins	—	—	—	—	—	0–0	—
118	August 7	@ Twins	—	—	—	—	—	0–0	—
119	August 8	@ Twins	—	—	—	—	—	0–0	—
120	August 9	@ Mariners	—	—	—	—	—	0–0	—
121	August 10	@ Mariners	—	—	—	—	—	0–0	—
122	August 11	@ Mariners	—	—	—	—	—	0–0	—
123	August 13	Blue Jays	—	—	—	—	—	0–0	—
124	August 14	Blue Jays	—	—	—	—	—	0–0	—
125	August 15	Blue Jays	—	—	—	—	—	0–0	—
126	August 16	Cardinals	—	—	—	—	—	0–0	—
127	August 17	Cardinals	—	—	—	—	—	0–0	—
128	August 18	Cardinals	—	—	—	—	—	0–0	—
129	August 20	Rays	—	—	—	—	—	0–0	—
130	August 21	Rays	—	—	—	—	—	0–0	—
131	August 22	Rays	—	—	—	—	—	0–0	—
132	August 23	@ Padres	—	—	—	—	—	0–0	—
133	August 24	@ Padres	—	—	—	—	—	0–0	—
134	August 25	@ Padres	—	—	—	—	—	0–0	—
135	August 27	@ Angels	—	—	—	—	—	0–0	—
136	August 28	@ Angels	—	—	—	—	—	0–0	—
137	August 29	@ Angels	—	—	—	—	—	0–0	—
138	August 30	@ Giants	—	—	—	—	—	0–0	—
139	August 31	@ Giants	—	—	—	—	—	0–0	—

September: 0–0 (Home: 0–0; Road: 0–0)

#	Date	Opponent	Score	Win	Loss	Save	Attendance	Record	Streak
140	September 1	@ Giants	—	—	—	—	—	0–0	—
141	September 3	Braves	—	—	—	—	—	0–0	—
142	September 4	Braves	—	—	—	—	—	0–0	—
143	September 5	Braves	—	—	—	—	—	0–0	—
144	September 6	Tigers	—	—	—	—	—	0–0	—
145	September 7	Tigers	—	—	—	—	—	0–0	—
146	September 8	Tigers	—	—	—	—	—	0–0	—
147	September 10	@ Mets	—	—	—	—	—	0–0	—
148	September 11	@ Mets	—	—	—	—	—	0–0	—
149	September 12	@ Mets	—	—	—	—	—	0–0	—
150	September 13	@ Royals	—	—	—	—	—	0–0	—
151	September 14	@ Royals	—	—	—	—	—	0–0	—
152	September 15	@ Royals	—	—	—	—	—	0–0	—
153	September 16	@ Royals	—	—	—	—	—	0–0	—
154	September 17	@ Pirates	—	—	—	—	—	0–0	—
155	September 18	@ Pirates	—	—	—	—	—	0–0	—
156	September 19	@ Pirates	—	—	—	—	—	0–0	—
157	September 21	Royals	—	—	—	—	—	0–0	—
158	September 22	Royals	—	—	—	—	—	0–0	—
159	September 23	Royals	—	—	—	—	—	0–0	—
160	September 24	Reds	—	—	—	—	—	0–0	—
161	September 25	Reds	—	—	—	—	—	0–0	—
162	September 26	Reds	—	—	—	—	—	0–0	—

== Current roster ==
Cleveland Guardians 2027 spring training roster
40-man roster		Non-roster invitees	Coaches / other
Pitchers: 55 Franco Alemán; 26 Logan Allen; 28 Tanner Bibee; -- Justin Campbell; 54 Joey Cantillo; 44 Slade Cecconi; 41 Daniel Espino; 52 Matt Festa; 33 Hunter Gaddis; 95 Yorman Gómez; 29 Tim Herrin; 35 Colin Holderman; 77 Parker Messick; 49 Austin Peterson; 62 Erik Sabrowski; 36 Cade Smith; 91 Andrew Walters; 32 Gavin Williams; 23 Craig Yoho	Catchers: 16 Patrick Bailey; -- Kody Huff; 30 Cooper Ingle; Infielders: 37 Travis Bazzana; 17 Ángel Genao; 2 CJ Kayfus; 9 Kyle Manzardo; 11 José Ramírez; 4 Brayan Rocchio; -- José Tena; 78 Milán Tolentino; Outfielders: 7 Jo Adell; -- Jaison Chourio; 24 Chase DeLauter; 0 Petey Halpin; 38 Steven Kwan; 1 Ángel Martínez; -- Blake Perkins; 10 Daniel Schneemann; 31 Kahlil Watson	Pitchers: -- Antoine Kelly	Manager: 12 Stephen Vogt; Coaches: 15 Sandy Alomar Jr. (first base/catching); 57 Tony Arnerich (bench coach); 85 Junior Betances (assistant hitting); 56 Grant Fink (hitting); 81 Brad Goldberg (assistant pitching); 88 Caleb Longshore (bullpen); 84 J. T. Maguire (outfield/base running); 87 Andy McKay (field coordinator); 53 Rouglas Odor (third base/infield); 82 Ricky Pacione (bullpen catcher); 83 Dan Puente (assistant hitting); 89 Agustin Rivero (coach/interpreter); 72 Eric Rodríguez (bullpen catcher); -- Josh Tubbs (hitting analyst); 51 Carl Willis (pitching); Restricted list: 48 Emmanuel Clase; 45 Luis Ortiz; 39 active, 0 inactive, 1 non-roster invitees; 7-, 10-, or 15-day injured list; * Not on active roster; ^{†} Suspended list; Roster, coaches, and NRIs updated November 20, 2026; Transactions • Depth chart; → All MLB rosters

== Farm system ==
Level	Team	League	Manager
AAA	Columbus Clippers	International League	
AA	Akron RubberDucks	Eastern League	
High-A	Lake County Captains	Midwest League	
Low–A	Hill City Howlers	Carolina League	
Rookie	ACL Guardians	Arizona Complex League	
Rookie	DSL Guardians Goryl	Dominican Summer League	
Rookie	DSL Guardians Mendoza	Dominican Summer League	
