= 2027 New York Mets season =

2027 New York Mets
- League: National League
- Division: East
- Ballpark: Citi Field
- City: New York City, New York
- Owner: Steve Cohen
- President: David Stearns
- Manager: Andy Green
- Television: SportsNet New York; PIX 11 (Note: Games on PIX 11 also air on WCCT-TV (Hartford, CT), WCWN/WRGB (Albany, NY), WYCI (Saranac Lake, NY), WSYT-MY43 (Syracuse, NY), WPNY-LD (Utica, NY), WICZ-DT2 (Binghamton, NY), WQMY (Williamsport, PA), WOLF-DT3 (Scranton, PA) and WHAM-DT2 (Rochester, NY).)
- Radio: WHSQ 880 AM (English); New York Mets Radio Network

The 2027 New York Mets season is scheduled to be the 66th season of the New York Mets in Major League Baseball, their 19th at Citi Field, and their seventh under majority owner Steve Cohen. The Mets would attempt to improve on their 74-88 record from 2026 and return to the playoffs after a two-year absence and win the NL East for the first time since 2015.

The season is contingent on Major League Baseball (MLB) and the Major League Baseball Players Association (MLBPA) signing a new collective bargaining agreement (CBA). Without a new CBA, MLB is expected to lock out the players on December 2, 2026, until one is signed. If such a lockout extends indefinitely, the season could be postponed, shortened, or even cancelled.

== Game log ==
The 2027 schedule is tentative until a new collective bargaining agreement (CBA) is signed between Major League Baseball (MLB) and the Major League Baseball Players Association (MLBPA). If the labor dispute extends into late February or early March, MLB would then start to consider whether to postpone or shorten the season.

Legend
Mets Win	Mets Loss	Game Postponed
Bold = Mets team member

2027 Game Log
Overall: 0–0 (Home: 0–0; Away: 0–0)
March/April: 0–0 (Home: 0–0; Away: 0–0)

#	Date	Opponent	Box Score	Win	Loss	Save	Location (Attendance)	Record
1	March 25	@ Marlins	—	—	—	—	LoanDepot Park (—)	–
2	March 27	@ Marlins	—	—	—	—	LoanDepot Park (—)	–
3	March 28	@ Marlins	—	—	—	—	LoanDepot Park (—)	–
4	March 29	@ Nationals	—	—	—	—	Nationals Park (—)	–
5	March 30	@ Nationals	—	—	—	—	Nationals Park (—)	–
6	March 31	@ Nationals	—	—	—	—	Nationals Park (—)	–
7	April 2	Giants	—	—	—	—	**Citi Field** (—)	–
8	April 3	Giants	—	—	—	—	**Citi Field** (—)	–
9	April 4	Giants	—	—	—	—	**Citi Field** (—)	–
10	April 5	Reds	—	—	—	—	**Citi Field** (—)	–
11	April 6	Reds	—	—	—	—	**Citi Field** (—)	–
12	April 7	Reds	—	—	—	—	**Citi Field** (—)	–
13	April 8	Reds	—	—	—	—	**Citi Field** (—)	–
14	April 9	@ Tigers	—	—	—	—	Fifth Third Park (—)	–
15	April 10	@ Tigers	—	—	—	—	Fifth Third Park (—)	–
16	April 11	@ Tigers	—	—	—	—	Fifth Third Park (—)	–
17	April 13	Angels	—	—	—	—	**Citi Field** (—)	–
18	April 14	Angels	—	—	—	—	**Citi Field** (—)	–
19	April 15	Angels	—	—	—	—	**Citi Field** (—)	–
20	April 16	@ Rockies	—	—	—	—	Coors Field (—)	–
21	April 17	@ Rockies	—	—	—	—	Coors Field (—)	–
22	April 18	@ Rockies	—	—	—	—	Coors Field (—)	–
23	April 19	@ Athletics	—	—	—	—	Sutter Health Park (—)	–
24	April 20	@ Athletics	—	—	—	—	Sutter Health Park (—)	–
25	April 21	@ Athletics	—	—	—	—	Sutter Health Park (—)	–
26	April 23	Rangers	—	—	—	—	**Citi Field** (—)	–
27	April 24	Rangers	—	—	—	—	**Citi Field** (—)	–
28	April 25	Rangers	—	—	—	—	**Citi Field** (—)	–
29	April 26	Blue Jays	—	—	—	—	**Citi Field** (—)	–
30	April 27	Blue Jays	—	—	—	—	**Citi Field** (—)	–
31	April 28	Blue Jays	—	—	—	—	**Citi Field** (—)	–
32	April 29	@ Braves	—	—	—	—	Truist Park (—)	–
33	April 30	@ Braves	—	—	—	—	Truist Park (—)	–

May: 0–0 (Home: 0–0; Away: 0–0)

#	Date	Opponent	Box Score	Win	Loss	Save	Location (Attendance)	Record
34	May 1	@ Braves	—	—	—	—	Truist Park (—)	–
35	May 2	@ Braves	—	—	—	—	Truist Park (—)	–
36	May 4	@ Phillies	—	—	—	—	Citizens Bank Park (—)	–
37	May 5	@ Phillies	—	—	—	—	Citizens Bank Park (—)	–
38	May 6	@ Phillies	—	—	—	—	Citizens Bank Park (—)	–
39	May 7	Rays	—	—	—	—	**Citi Field** (—)	–
40	May 8	Rays	—	—	—	—	**Citi Field** (—)	–
41	May 9	Rays	—	—	—	—	**Citi Field** (—)	–
42	May 11	Phillies	—	—	—	—	**Citi Field** (—)	–
43	May 12	Phillies	—	—	—	—	**Citi Field** (—)	–
44	May 13	Phillies	—	—	—	—	**Citi Field** (—)	–
45	May 14	@ Brewers	—	—	—	—	American Family Field (—)	–
46	May 15	@ Brewers	—	—	—	—	American Family Field (—)	–
47	May 16	@ Brewers	—	—	—	—	American Family Field (—)	–
48	May 17	@ Padres	—	—	—	—	Petco Park (—)	–
49	May 18	@ Padres	—	—	—	—	Petco Park (—)	–
50	May 19	@ Padres	—	—	—	—	Petco Park (—)	–
51	May 21	@ Twins	—	—	—	—	Target Field (—)	–
52	May 22	@ Twins	—	—	—	—	Target Field (—)	–
53	May 23	@ Twins	—	—	—	—	Target Field (—)	–
54	May 24	Braves	—	—	—	—	**Citi Field** (—)	–
55	May 25	Braves	—	—	—	—	**Citi Field** (—)	–
56	May 26	Braves	—	—	—	—	**Citi Field** (—)	–
57	May 28	Yankees	—	—	—	—	**Citi Field** (—)	–
58	May 29	Yankees	—	—	—	—	**Citi Field** (—)	–
59	May 30	Yankees	—	—	—	—	**Citi Field** (—)	–
60	May 31	@ Orioles	—	—	—	—	Camden Yards (—)	–

June: 0–0 (Home: 0–0; Away: 0–0)

#	Date	Opponent	Box Score	Win	Loss	Save	Location (Attendance)	Record
61	June 1	@ Orioles	—	—	—	—	Camden Yards (—)	–
62	June 2	@ Orioles	—	—	—	—	Camden Yards (—)	–
63	June 3	Marlins	—	—	—	—	**Citi Field** (—)	–
64	June 4	Marlins	—	—	—	—	**Citi Field** (—)	–
65	June 5	Marlins	—	—	—	—	**Citi Field** (—)	–
66	June 6	Marlins	—	—	—	—	**Citi Field** (—)	–
67	June 7	@ Royals	—	—	—	—	Kauffman Stadium (—)	–
68	June 8	@ Royals	—	—	—	—	Kauffman Stadium (—)	–
69	June 9	@ Royals	—	—	—	—	Kauffman Stadium (—)	–
70	June 11	@ Giants	—	—	—	—	Oracle Park (—)	–
71	June 12	@ Giants	—	—	—	—	Oracle Park (—)	–
72	June 13	@ Giants	—	—	—	—	Oracle Park (—)	–
73	June 15	Padres	—	—	—	—	**Citi Field** (—)	–
74	June 16	Padres	—	—	—	—	**Citi Field** (—)	–
75	June 17	Padres	—	—	—	—	**Citi Field** (—)	–
76	June 18	Nationals	—	—	—	—	**Citi Field** (—)	–
77	June 19	Nationals	—	—	—	—	**Citi Field** (—)	–
78	June 20	Nationals	—	—	—	—	**Citi Field** (—)	–
79	June 21	Brewers	—	—	—	—	**Citi Field** (—)	–
80	June 22	Brewers	—	—	—	—	**Citi Field** (—)	–
81	June 23	Brewers	—	—	—	—	**Citi Field** (—)	–
82	June 25	@ Cardinals	—	—	—	—	Busch Stadium (—)	–
83	June 26	@ Cardinals	—	—	—	—	Busch Stadium (—)	–
84	June 27	@ Cardinals	—	—	—	—	Busch Stadium (—)	–
85	June 28	@ Diamondbacks	—	—	—	—	Chase Field (—)	–
86	June 29	@ Diamondbacks	—	—	—	—	Chase Field (—)	–
87	June 30	@ Diamondbacks	—	—	—	—	Chase Field (—)	–

July: 0–0 (Home: 0–0; Away: 0–0)

#	Date	Opponent	Box Score	Win	Loss	Save	Location (Attendance)	Record
88	July 1	@ Dodgers	—	—	—	—	Dodger Stadium (—)	–
89	July 2	@ Dodgers	—	—	—	—	Dodger Stadium (—)	–
90	July 3	@ Dodgers	—	—	—	—	Dodger Stadium (—)	–
91	July 4	@ Dodgers	—	—	—	—	Dodger Stadium (—)	–
92	July 6	Marlins	—	—	—	—	**Citi Field** (—)	–
93	July 7	Marlins	—	—	—	—	**Citi Field** (—)	–
94	July 8	Marlins	—	—	—	—	**Citi Field** (—)	–
95	July 9	Dodgers	—	—	—	—	**Citi Field** (—)	–
96	July 10	Dodgers	—	—	—	—	**Citi Field** (—)	–
97	July 11	Dodgers	—	—	—	—	**Citi Field** (—)	–
**97th All-Star Game in Chicago, Illinois**
98	July 16	@ Yankees	—	—	—	—	Yankee Stadium (—)	–
99	July 17	@ Yankees	—	—	—	—	Yankee Stadium (—)	–
100	July 18	@ Yankees	—	—	—	—	Yankee Stadium (—)	–
101	July 19	@ Red Sox	—	—	—	—	Fenway Park (—)	–
102	July 20	@ Red Sox	—	—	—	—	Fenway Park (—)	–
103	July 21	@ Red Sox	—	—	—	—	Fenway Park (—)	–
104	July 22	Phillies	—	—	—	—	**Citi Field** (—)	–
105	July 23	Phillies	—	—	—	—	**Citi Field** (—)	–
106	July 24	Phillies	—	—	—	—	**Citi Field** (—)	–
107	July 25	Phillies	—	—	—	—	**Citi Field** (—)	–
108	July 26	Diamondbacks	—	—	—	—	**Citi Field** (—)	–
109	July 27	Diamondbacks	—	—	—	—	**Citi Field** (—)	–
110	July 28	Diamondbacks	—	—	—	—	**Citi Field** (—)	–
111	July 30	@ Pirates	—	—	—	—	PNC Park (—)	–
112	July 31	@ Pirates	—	—	—	—	PNC Park (—)	–

August: 0–0 (Home: 0–0; Away: 0–0)

#	Date	Opponent	Box Score	Win	Loss	Save	Location (Attendance)	Record
113	August 1	@ Pirates	—	—	—	—	PNC Park (—)	–
114	August 2	@ Reds	—	—	—	—	Great American Ball Park (—)	–
115	August 3	@ Reds	—	—	—	—	Great American Ball Park (—)	–
116	August 4	@ Reds	—	—	—	—	Great American Ball Park (—)	–
117	August 6	Nationals	—	—	—	—	**Citi Field** (—)	–
118	August 7	Nationals	—	—	—	—	**Citi Field** (—)	–
119	August 8	Nationals	—	—	—	—	**Citi Field** (—)	–
120	August 9	Braves	—	—	—	—	**Citi Field** (—)	–
121	August 10	Braves	—	—	—	—	**Citi Field** (—)	–
122	August 11	Braves	—	—	—	—	**Citi Field** (—)	–
123	August 13	Cardinals	—	—	—	—	**Citi Field** (—)	–
124	August 14	Cardinals	—	—	—	—	**Citi Field** (—)	–
125	August 15	Cardinals	—	—	—	—	**Citi Field** (—)	–
126	August 17	@ Astros	—	—	—	—	Daikin Park (—)	–
127	August 18	@ Astros	—	—	—	—	Daikin Park (—)	–
128	August 19	@ Astros	—	—	—	—	Daikin Park (—)	–
129	August 20	@ Braves	—	—	—	—	Truist Park (—)	–
130	August 21	@ Braves	—	—	—	—	Truist Park (—)	–
131	August 22	@ Braves	—	—	—	—	Truist Park (—)	–
132	August 24	Rockies	—	—	—	—	**Citi Field** (—)	–
133	August 25	Rockies	—	—	—	—	**Citi Field** (—)	–
134	August 26	Rockies	—	—	—	—	**Citi Field** (—)	–
135	August 27	White Sox	—	—	—	—	**Citi Field** (—)	–
136	August 28	White Sox	—	—	—	—	**Citi Field** (—)	–
137	August 29	White Sox	—	—	—	—	**Citi Field** (—)	–
138	August 31	@ Marlins	—	—	—	—	LoanDepot Park (—)	–

September: 0–0 (Home: 0–0; Away: 0–0)

#	Date	Opponent	Box Score	Win	Loss	Save	Location (Attendance)	Record
139	September 1	@ Marlins	—	—	—	—	LoanDepot Park (—)	–
140	September 2	@ Marlins	—	—	—	—	LoanDepot Park (—)	–
141	September 3	@ Phillies	—	—	—	—	Citizens Bank Park (—)	–
142	September 4	@ Phillies	—	—	—	—	Citizens Bank Park (—)	–
143	September 5	@ Phillies	—	—	—	—	Citizens Bank Park (—)	–
144	September 6	Mariners	—	—	—	—	**Citi Field** (—)	–
145	September 7	Mariners	—	—	—	—	**Citi Field** (—)	–
146	September 8	Mariners	—	—	—	—	**Citi Field** (—)	–
147	September 10	Guardians	—	—	—	—	**Citi Field** (—)	–
148	September 11	Guardians	—	—	—	—	**Citi Field** (—)	–
149	September 12	Guardians	—	—	—	—	**Citi Field** (—)	–
150	September 13	@ Nationals	—	—	—	—	Nationals Park (—)	–
151	September 14	@ Nationals	—	—	—	—	Nationals Park (—)	–
152	September 15	@ Nationals	—	—	—	—	Nationals Park (—)	–
153	September 16	@ Nationals	—	—	—	—	Nationals Park (—)	–
154	September 17	@ Cubs	—	—	—	—	Wrigley Field (—)	–
155	September 18	@ Cubs	—	—	—	—	Wrigley Field (—)	–
156	September 19	@ Cubs	—	—	—	—	Wrigley Field (—)	–
157	September 21	Pirates	—	—	—	—	**Citi Field** (—)	–
158	September 22	Pirates	—	—	—	—	**Citi Field** (—)	–
159	September 23	Pirates	—	—	—	—	**Citi Field** (—)	–
160	September 24	Cubs	—	—	—	—	**Citi Field** (—)	–
161	September 25	Cubs	—	—	—	—	**Citi Field** (—)	–
162	September 26	Cubs	—	—	—	—	**Citi Field** (—)	–

== Current roster ==
New York Mets 2027 spring training roster
40-man roster		Non-roster invitees	Coaches / other
Pitchers: —- Jack Anderson; 54 Daniel Duarte; 75 Reed Garrett; 47 Justin Hagenman; 94 Nate Lavender; 59 Sean Manaea; 26 Nolan McLean; 58 Tylor Megill; 32 Tobias Myers; 72 Dedniel Núñez; —- Pierson Ohl; 52 Cionel Pérez; 91 Jonathan Pintaro; 45 Christian Scott; 34 Kodai Senga; 89 Robert Stock; 49 Zac Thornton; 21 Jonah Tong; -- Yunior Tur; -- Gus Varland; 44 Austin Warren; 82 Jack Weisenburger; 38 Devin Williams; 84 Jefry Yan	Catchers: 4 Francisco Álvarez; 13 Luis Torrens; Infielders: 7 Brett Baty; 19 Bo Bichette; 12 Francisco Lindor; 0 Ronny Mauricio; 11 Jorge Polanco; -- Jefferson Rojas; 10 Marcus Semien; 27 Mark Vientos; 29 Jared Young; Outfielders: 3 Carson Benge; 9 A. J. Ewing; 55 Nick Morabito; 22 Juan Soto	Pitchers: -- Joel Kuhnel	Manager: 70 Andy Green; Coaches: 68 J. P. Arencibia (catching); 50 Kai Correa (bench); 80 Rafael Fernandez (assistant hitting); 65 Gilbert Gomez (first base and outfield); 78 Eric Langill (bullpen catcher); 63 Tim Leiper (third base and infield); 76 Dan McKinney (assistant pitching); 77 Dave Racaniello (bullpen catcher); 67 José Rosado (bullpen); 60 Troy Snitker (hitting); 62 Justin Willard (pitching); 39 active, 0 inactive, 1 non-roster invitees; 7-, 10-, or 15-day injured list; * Not on active roster; ^{†} Suspended list; Roster, coaches, and NRIs updated November 20, 2026; Transactions • Depth chart; → All MLB rosters

== Farm system ==
Level	Team	League	Manager
AAA	Syracuse Mets	International League	
AA	Binghamton Rumble Ponies	Eastern League	
High-A	Brooklyn Cyclones	South Atlantic League	
Low-A	St. Lucie Mets	Florida State League	
Rookie	FCL Mets	Florida Complex League	
Rookie	DSL Mets 1	Dominican Summer League	
Rookie	DSL Mets 2	Dominican Summer League	
