= 2027 Athletics season =

2027 Athletics
- League: American League
- Division: West
- Ballpark: Sutter Health Park; Las Vegas Ballpark
- City: West Sacramento, California; Summerlin South, Nevada
- Owner: John Fisher
- President of baseball operations: Taylor Smith
- Manager: Mark Kotsay
- Television: NBC Sports California
- Radio: KNEW; Athletics Radio Network

The 2027 Athletics season is scheduled to be the 127th season for the Athletics franchise, the 60th season in California, and the franchise's third year in West Sacramento. Should the New Las Vegas Stadium be completed on time, this will be both the final season in the Sacramento area as well as in California.

The season is contingent on Major League Baseball (MLB) and the Major League Baseball Players Association (MLBPA) signing a new collective bargaining agreement (CBA). Without a new CBA, MLB is expected to lock out the players on December 2, 2026, until one is signed. If such a lockout extends indefinitely, the season could be postponed, shortened, or even cancelled.

== Game log ==
The 2027 schedule is tentative until a new collective bargaining agreement (CBA) is signed between Major League Baseball (MLB) and the Major League Baseball Players Association (MLBPA). If the labor dispute extends into late February or early March, MLB would then start to consider whether to postpone or shorten the season.

Legend
Athletics Win	Athletics Loss	Game postponed / Tie

2027 game log
Total: 0–0 (Home: 0–0; Away: 0–0)
March/April: 0–0 (Home: 0–0; Away: 0–0)

#	Date	Opponent	Score	Win	Loss	Save	Stadium (Attendance)	Record	Streak
1	March 25	@ Pirates	—	—	—	—	PNC Park	–	—
2	March 26	@ Pirates	—	—	—	—	PNC Park	–	—
3	March 27	@ Pirates	—	—	—	—	PNC Park	–	—
4	March 29	@ Yankees	—	—	—	—	Yankee Stadium	–	—
5	March 30	@ Yankees	—	—	—	—	Yankee Stadium	–	—
6	March 31	@ Yankees	—	—	—	—	Yankee Stadium	–	—
7	April 1	@ Rangers	—	—	—	—	Globe Life Field	–	—
8	April 2	@ Rangers	—	—	—	—	Globe Life Field	–	—
9	April 3	@ Rangers	—	—	—	—	Globe Life Field	–	—
10	April 4	@ Rangers	—	—	—	—	Globe Life Field	–	—
11	April 5	Cubs	—	—	—	—	Sutter Health Park	–	—
12	April 6	Cubs	—	—	—	—	Sutter Health Park	–	—
13	April 7	Cubs	—	—	—	—	Sutter Health Park	–	—
14	April 9	White Sox	—	—	—	—	Sutter Health Park	–	—
15	April 10	White Sox	—	—	—	—	Sutter Health Park	–	—
16	April 11	White Sox	—	—	—	—	Sutter Health Park	–	—
17	April 13	@ Royals	—	—	—	—	Kauffman Stadium	–	—
18	April 14	@ Royals	—	—	—	—	Kauffman Stadium	–	—
19	April 15	@ Royals	—	—	—	—	Kauffman Stadium	–	—
20	April 16	@ Blue Jays	—	—	—	—	Rogers Centre	–	—
21	April 17	@ Blue Jays	—	—	—	—	Rogers Centre	–	—
22	April 18	@ Blue Jays	—	—	—	—	Rogers Centre	–	—
23	April 19	Mets	—	—	—	—	Sutter Health Park	–	—
24	April 20	Mets	—	—	—	—	Sutter Health Park	–	—
25	April 21	Mets	—	—	—	—	Sutter Health Park	–	—
26	April 22	Mariners	—	—	—	—	Sutter Health Park	–	—
27	April 23	Mariners	—	—	—	—	Sutter Health Park	–	—
28	April 24	Mariners	—	—	—	—	Sutter Health Park	–	—
29	April 25	Mariners	—	—	—	—	Sutter Health Park	–	—
30	April 27	@ Twins	—	—	—	—	Target Field	–	—
31	April 28	@ Twins	—	—	—	—	Target Field	–	—
32	April 29	@ Twins	—	—	—	—	Target Field	–	—
33	April 30	@ Rockies	—	—	—	—	Coors Field	–	—

May: 0–0 (Home: 0–0; Away: 0–0)

#	Date	Opponent	Score	Win	Loss	Save	Stadium (Attendance)	Record	Streak
34	May 1	@ Rockies	—	—	—	—	Coors Field	–	—
35	May 2	@ Rockies	—	—	—	—	Coors Field	–	—
36	May 3	Guardians	—	—	—	—	Sutter Health Park	–	—
37	May 4	Guardians	—	—	—	—	Sutter Health Park	–	—
38	May 5	Guardians	—	—	—	—	Sutter Health Park	–	—
39	May 7	Angels	—	—	—	—	Sutter Health Park	–	—
40	May 8	Angels	—	—	—	—	Sutter Health Park	–	—
41	May 9	Angels	—	—	—	—	Sutter Health Park	–	—
42	May 11	@ Cardinals	—	—	—	—	Busch Stadium	–	—
43	May 12	@ Cardinals	—	—	—	—	Busch Stadium	–	—
44	May 13	@ Cardinals	—	—	—	—	Busch Stadium	–	—
45	May 14	@ Angels	—	—	—	—	Angel Stadium	–	—
46	May 15	@ Angels	—	—	—	—	Angel Stadium	–	—
47	May 16	@ Angels	—	—	—	—	Angel Stadium	–	—
48	May 17	Twins	—	—	—	—	Sutter Health Park	–	—
49	May 18	Twins	—	—	—	—	Sutter Health Park	–	—
50	May 19	Twins	—	—	—	—	Sutter Health Park	–	—
51	May 20	Astros	—	—	—	—	Sutter Health Park	–	—
52	May 21	Astros	—	—	—	—	Sutter Health Park	–	—
53	May 22	Astros	—	—	—	—	Sutter Health Park	–	—
54	May 23	Astros	—	—	—	—	Sutter Health Park	–	—
55	May 24	@ Mariners	—	—	—	—	T-Mobile Park	–	—
56	May 25	@ Mariners	—	—	—	—	T-Mobile Park	–	—
57	May 26	@ Mariners	—	—	—	—	T-Mobile Park	–	—
58	May 28	@ Astros	—	—	—	—	Daikin Park	–	—
59	May 29	@ Astros	—	—	—	—	Daikin Park	–	—
60	May 30	@ Astros	—	—	—	—	Daikin Park	–	—
61	May 31	Padres	—	—	—	—	Las Vegas Ballpark	–	—

June: 0–0 (Home: 0–0; Away: 0–0)

#	Date	Opponent	Score	Win	Loss	Save	Stadium (Attendance)	Record	Streak
62	June 1	Padres	—	—	—	—	Las Vegas Ballpark	–	—
63	June 2	Padres	—	—	—	—	Las Vegas Ballpark	–	—
64	June 3	Reds	—	—	—	—	Las Vegas Ballpark	–	—
65	June 4	Reds	—	—	—	—	Las Vegas Ballpark	–	—
66	June 5	Reds	—	—	—	—	Las Vegas Ballpark	–	—
67	June 7	Rangers	—	—	—	—	Sutter Health Park	–	—
68	June 8	Rangers	—	—	—	—	Sutter Health Park	–	—
69	June 9	Rangers	—	—	—	—	Sutter Health Park	–	—
70	June 11	Braves	—	—	—	—	Sutter Health Park	–	—
71	June 12	Braves	—	—	—	—	Sutter Health Park	–	—
72	June 13	Braves	—	—	—	—	Sutter Health Park	–	—
73	June 15	@ Red Sox	—	—	—	—	Fenway Park	–	—
74	June 16	@ Red Sox	—	—	—	—	Fenway Park	–	—
75	June 17	@ Red Sox	—	—	—	—	Fenway Park	–	—
76	June 18	@ Guardians	—	—	—	—	Progressive Field	–	—
77	June 19	@ Guardians	—	—	—	—	Progressive Field	–	—
78	June 20	@ Guardians	—	—	—	—	Progressive Field	–	—
79	June 21	Red Sox	—	—	—	—	Sutter Health Park	–	—
80	June 22	Red Sox	—	—	—	—	Sutter Health Park	–	—
81	June 23	Red Sox	—	—	—	—	Sutter Health Park	–	—
82	June 25	Diamondbacks	—	—	—	—	Sutter Health Park	–	—
83	June 26	Diamondbacks	—	—	—	—	Sutter Health Park	–	—
84	June 27	Diamondbacks	—	—	—	—	Sutter Health Park	–	—
85	June 29	@ Orioles	—	—	—	—	Camden Yards	–	—
86	June 30	@ Orioles	—	—	—	—	Camden Yards	–	—

July: 0–0 (Home: 0–0; Away: 0–0)

#	Date	Opponent	Score	Win	Loss	Save	Stadium (Attendance)	Record	Streak
87	July 1	@ Orioles	—	—	—	—	Camden Yards	–	—
88	July 2	@ Nationals	—	—	—	—	Nationals Park	–	—
89	July 3	@ Nationals	—	—	—	—	Nationals Park	–	—
90	July 4	@ Nationals	—	—	—	—	Nationals Park	–	—
91	July 5	Blue Jays	—	—	—	—	Sutter Health Park	–	—
92	July 6	Blue Jays	—	—	—	—	Sutter Health Park	–	—
93	July 7	Blue Jays	—	—	—	—	Sutter Health Park	–	—
94	July 8	Blue Jays	—	—	—	—	Sutter Health Park	–	—
95	July 9	Rangers	—	—	—	—	Sutter Health Park	–	—
96	July 10	Rangers	—	—	—	—	Sutter Health Park	–	—
97	July 11	Rangers	—	—	—	—	Sutter Health Park	–	—
–	July 13	97th All-Star Game in Chicago, IL							
98	July 16	@ Giants	—	—	—	—	Oracle Park	–	—
99	July 17	@ Giants	—	—	—	—	Oracle Park	–	—
100	July 18	@ Giants	—	—	—	—	Oracle Park	–	—
101	July 19	@ Dodgers	—	—	—	—	Dodger Stadium	–	—
102	July 20	@ Dodgers	—	—	—	—	Dodger Stadium	–	—
103	July 21	@ Dodgers	—	—	—	—	Dodger Stadium	–	—
104	July 22	@ Angels	—	—	—	—	Angel Stadium	–	—
105	July 23	@ Angels	—	—	—	—	Angel Stadium	–	—
106	July 24	@ Angels	—	—	—	—	Angel Stadium	–	—
107	July 25	@ Angels	—	—	—	—	Angel Stadium	–	—
108	July 27	Orioles	—	—	—	—	Sutter Health Park	–	—
109	July 28	Orioles	—	—	—	—	Sutter Health Park	–	—
110	July 29	Orioles	—	—	—	—	Sutter Health Park	–	—
111	July 30	Rays	—	—	—	—	Sutter Health Park	–	—
112	July 31	Rays	—	—	—	—	Sutter Health Park	–	—

August: 0–0 (Home: 0–0; Away: 0–0)

#	Date	Opponent	Score	Win	Loss	Save	Stadium (Attendance)	Record	Streak
113	August 1	Rays	—	—	—	—	Sutter Health Park	–	—
114	August 3	@ Marlins	—	—	—	—	LoanDepot Park	–	—
115	August 4	@ Marlins	—	—	—	—	LoanDepot Park	–	—
116	August 5	@ Marlins	—	—	—	—	LoanDepot Park	–	—
117	August 6	@ Rangers	—	—	—	—	Globe Life Field	–	—
118	August 7	@ Rangers	—	—	—	—	Globe Life Field	–	—
119	August 8	@ Rangers	—	—	—	—	Globe Life Field	–	—
120	August 10	Tigers	—	—	—	—	Sutter Health Park	–	—
121	August 11	Tigers	—	—	—	—	Sutter Health Park	–	—
122	August 12	Tigers	—	—	—	—	Sutter Health Park	–	—
123	August 13	Angels	—	—	—	—	Sutter Health Park	–	—
124	August 14	Angels	—	—	—	—	Sutter Health Park	–	—
125	August 15	Angels	—	—	—	—	Sutter Health Park	–	—
126	August 16	@ Brewers	—	—	—	—	American Family Field	–	—
127	August 17	@ Brewers	—	—	—	—	American Family Field	–	—
128	August 18	@ Brewers	—	—	—	—	American Family Field	–	—
129	August 19	@ White Sox	—	—	—	—	Rate Field	–	—
130	August 20	@ White Sox	—	—	—	—	Rate Field	–	—
131	August 21	@ White Sox	—	—	—	—	Rate Field	–	—
132	August 22	@ White Sox	—	—	—	—	Rate Field	–	—
133	August 24	Phillies	—	—	—	—	Sutter Health Park	–	—
134	August 25	Phillies	—	—	—	—	Sutter Health Park	–	—
135	August 26	Phillies	—	—	—	—	Sutter Health Park	–	—
136	August 27	Giants	—	—	—	—	Sutter Health Park	–	—
137	August 28	Giants	—	—	—	—	Sutter Health Park	–	—
138	August 29	Giants	—	—	—	—	Sutter Health Park	–	—
139	August 30	@ Mariners	—	—	—	—	T-Mobile Park	–	—
140	August 31	@ Mariners	—	—	—	—	T-Mobile Park	–	—

September: 0–0 (Home: 0–0; Away: 0–0)

#	Date	Opponent	Score	Win	Loss	Save	Stadium (Attendance)	Record	Streak
141	September 1	@ Mariners	—	—	—	—	T-Mobile Park	–	—
142	September 3	@ Astros	—	—	—	—	Daikin Park	–	—
143	September 4	@ Astros	—	—	—	—	Daikin Park	–	—
144	September 5	@ Astros	—	—	—	—	Daikin Park	–	—
145	September 6	Royals	—	—	—	—	Sutter Health Park	–	—
146	September 7	Royals	—	—	—	—	Sutter Health Park	–	—
147	September 8	Royals	—	—	—	—	Sutter Health Park	–	—
148	September 10	Yankees	—	—	—	—	Sutter Health Park	–	—
149	September 11	Yankees	—	—	—	—	Sutter Health Park	–	—
150	September 12	Yankees	—	—	—	—	Sutter Health Park	–	—
151	September 14	@ Rays	—	—	—	—	Tropicana Field	–	—
152	September 15	@ Rays	—	—	—	—	Tropicana Field	–	—
153	September 16	@ Rays	—	—	—	—	Tropicana Field	–	—
154	September 17	@ Tigers	—	—	—	—	Fifth Third Park	–	—
155	September 18	@ Tigers	—	—	—	—	Fifth Third Park	–	—
156	September 19	@ Tigers	—	—	—	—	Fifth Third Park	–	—
157	September 21	Astros	—	—	—	—	Sutter Health Park	–	—
158	September 22	Astros	—	—	—	—	Sutter Health Park	–	—
159	September 23	Astros	—	—	—	—	Sutter Health Park	–	—
160	September 24	Mariners	—	—	—	—	Sutter Health Park	–	—
161	September 25	Mariners	—	—	—	—	Sutter Health Park	–	—
162	September 26	Mariners	—	—	—	—	Sutter Health Park	–	—

== Roster ==
Athletics 2027 spring training roster
40-man roster		Non-roster invitees	Coaches / other
Pitchers: 80 Elvis Alvarado; 63 Mason Barnett; 66 Brady Basso; -- Hunter Bigge; 49 Scott Blewett; -- Raymond Burgos; 35 J. T. Ginn; 36 Hogan Harris; 53 Gunnar Hoglund; 52 Seth Johnson; 61 Gage Jump; 57 Jacob Lopez; 46 Luis Medina; 19 Luis Morales; 67 Kade Morris; 50 Jack Perkins; -- Yaqui Rivera; -- Joe Rock; 39 Drew Rom; 56 Chris Roycroft; 40 Luis Severino; 60 Justin Sterner	Catchers: -- Cole Conn; 23 Shea Langeliers; Infielders: 20 Zack Gelof; 2 Darell Hernáiz; 44 Joshua Kuroda-Grauer; 16 Nick Kurtz; 3 Max Muncy; 29 Donovan Walton; 47 Tommy White; 12 Alika Williams; 5 Jacob Wilson; Outfielders: 33 Henry Bolte; 4 Lawrence Butler; 1 Denzel Clarke; 26 Carlos Cortes; -- Nate Eaton; 21 Tyler Soderstrom; Designated hitters: 25 Brent Rooker	Pitchers: -- Ben Bowden; -- Luke Little; -- Wilkin Ramos; -- Adam Seminaris; Catchers: -- Brian Serven; Outfielders: -- Joey Wiemer	Manager: 7 Mark Kotsay; Coaches: 18 Mike Aldrete (hitting); 51 Darren Bush (bench); 28 Ryan Christenson (first base); 41 Chris Cron (assistant hitting); 8 Bobby Crosby (third base); 88 Javy Guerra (bullpen); 55 Ramón Hernández (coach and interpreter); 71 Dan Hubbs (interim pitching); 91 Dustin Hughes (bullpen catcher); 72 Marcus Jensen (quality control); 90 Christian Molfetta (bullpen catcher); 40 active, 0 inactive, 6 non-roster invitees; 7-, 10-, or 15-day injured list; * Not on active roster; ^{†} Suspended list; Roster, coaches, and NRIs updated November 20, 2026; Transactions • Depth chart; → All MLB rosters

== Farm system ==
Level	Team	League	Division	Manager	Record
AAA	Las Vegas Aviators	Pacific Coast League	West		
AA	Midland RockHounds	Texas League	South		
High-A	Lansing Lugnuts	Midwest League	East		
Low-A	Stockton Ports	California League	North		
Rookie	ACL Athletics	Arizona Complex League	East		
Rookie	DSL Athletics	Dominican Summer League	West		
