= 2027 New York Yankees season =

2027 New York Yankees
- League: American League
- Division: East
- Ballpark: Yankee Stadium
- City: New York
- Owners: Yankee Global Enterprises
- President: Randy Levine
- General manager: Brian Cashman
- Manager: Aaron Boone
- Television: YES Network; Amazon Prime Video (Michael Kay, Ryan Ruocco, Paul O'Neill, Joe Girardi, David Cone, Meredith Marakovits, Jack Curry, Justin Shackil, Bob Lorenz, Nancy Newman, Todd Frazier, Nick Swisher)
- Radio: WFAN SportsRadio 66 AM / 101.9 FM; New York Yankees Radio Network (Dave Sims, Emmanuel Berbari, Suzyn Waldman); La X 96.3 HD2 TUDN Radio; Cadena Radio Yankees (Francisco Rivera, Rickie Ricardo)

The 2027 New York Yankees season is scheduled to be the 125th season for the New York Yankees of Major League Baseball, their tenth under manager Aaron Boone, and 30th season under general manager Brian Cashman.

The season is contingent on Major League Baseball (MLB) and the Major League Baseball Players Association (MLBPA) signing a new collective bargaining agreement (CBA). Without a new CBA, MLB is expected to lock out the players on December 2, 2026, until one is signed. If such a lockout extends indefinitely, the season could be postponed, shortened, or even cancelled.

== Offseason ==
=== Transactions ===
==== 2026 ====
- November 17 – Claimed right-handed starting pitcher Chase Hampton off waivers from the Baltimore Orioles. Also signed right-handed relief pitcher David Bednar to a 1-year, $23.5 million contract.

== Game log ==
The 2027 schedule is tentative until a new collective bargaining agreement (CBA) is signed between Major League Baseball (MLB) and the Major League Baseball Players Association (MLBPA). If the labor dispute extends into late February or early March, MLB would then start to consider whether to postpone or shorten the season.

Legend
	Yankees win
	Yankees loss
	Postponement
	Clinched playoff spot
**Bold**	Yankees team member

2027 Game Log: 0–0 (Home: 0–0; Away: 0–0)
March/April: 0–0 (Home: 0–0; Away: 0–0)

#	Date	Opponent	Score	Win	Loss	Save	Stadium	Attendance	Record
1	March 25	Blue Jays	—	—	—	—	**Yankee Stadium**	—	0–0
2	March 27	Blue Jays	—	—	—	—	**Yankee Stadium**	—	0–0
3	March 28	Blue Jays	—	—	—	—	**Yankee Stadium**	—	0–0
4	March 29	Athletics	—	—	—	—	**Yankee Stadium**	—	0–0
5	March 30	Athletics	—	—	—	—	**Yankee Stadium**	—	0–0
6	March 31	Athletics	—	—	—	—	**Yankee Stadium**	—	0–0
7	April 1	@ Guardians	—	—	—	—	Progressive Field	—	0–0
8	April 2	@ Guardians	—	—	—	—	Progressive Field	—	0–0
9	April 3	@ Guardians	—	—	—	—	Progressive Field	—	0–0
10	April 4	@ Guardians	—	—	—	—	Progressive Field	—	0–0
11	April 5	@ Pirates	—	—	—	—	PNC Park	—	0–0
12	April 6	@ Pirates	—	—	—	—	PNC Park	—	0–0
13	April 7	@ Pirates	—	—	—	—	PNC Park	—	0–0
14	April 9	Diamondbacks	—	—	—	—	**Yankee Stadium**	—	0–0
15	April 10	Diamondbacks	—	—	—	—	**Yankee Stadium**	—	0–0
16	April 11	Diamondbacks	—	—	—	—	**Yankee Stadium**	—	0–0
17	April 13	@ Tigers	—	—	—	—	Fifth Third Park	—	0–0
18	April 14	@ Tigers	—	—	—	—	Fifth Third Park	—	0–0
19	April 15	@ Tigers	—	—	—	—	Fifth Third Park	—	0–0
20	April 16	Nationals	—	—	—	—	**Yankee Stadium**	—	0–0
21	April 17	Nationals	—	—	—	—	**Yankee Stadium**	—	0–0
22	April 18	Nationals	—	—	—	—	**Yankee Stadium**	—	0–0
23	April 19	Brewers	—	—	—	—	**Yankee Stadium**	—	0–0
24	April 20	Brewers	—	—	—	—	**Yankee Stadium**	—	0–0
25	April 21	Brewers	—	—	—	—	**Yankee Stadium**	—	0–0
26	April 23	@ Astros	—	—	—	—	Daikin Park	—	0–0
27	April 24	@ Astros	—	—	—	—	Daikin Park	—	0–0
28	April 25	@ Astros	—	—	—	—	Daikin Park	—	0–0
29	April 26	@ Royals	—	—	—	—	Kauffman Stadium	—	0–0
30	April 27	@ Royals	—	—	—	—	Kauffman Stadium	—	0–0
31	April 28	@ Royals	—	—	—	—	Kauffman Stadium	—	0–0
32	April 30	Cubs	—	—	—	—	**Yankee Stadium**	—	0–0

May: 0–0 (Home: 0–0; Away: 0–0)

#	Date	Opponent	Score	Win	Loss	Save	Stadium	Attendance	Record
33	May 1	Cubs	—	—	—	—	**Yankee Stadium**	—	0–0
34	May 2	Cubs	—	—	—	—	**Yankee Stadium**	—	0–0
35	May 3	Rays	—	—	—	—	**Yankee Stadium**	—	0–0
36	May 4	Rays	—	—	—	—	**Yankee Stadium**	—	0–0
37	May 5	Rays	—	—	—	—	**Yankee Stadium**	—	0–0
38	May 6	Rays	—	—	—	—	**Yankee Stadium**	—	0–0
39	May 7	@ Marlins	—	—	—	—	LoanDepot Park	—	0–0
40	May 8	@ Marlins	—	—	—	—	LoanDepot Park	—	0–0
41	May 9	@ Marlins	—	—	—	—	LoanDepot Park	—	0–0
42	May 10	@ Orioles	—	—	—	—	Camden Yards	—	0–0
43	May 11	@ Orioles	—	—	—	—	Camden Yards	—	0–0
44	May 12	@ Orioles	—	—	—	—	Camden Yards	—	0–0
45	May 13	@ Orioles	—	—	—	—	Camden Yards	—	0–0
46	May 14	Phillies	—	—	—	—	**Yankee Stadium**	—	0–0
47	May 15	Phillies	—	—	—	—	**Yankee Stadium**	—	0–0
48	May 16	Phillies	—	—	—	—	**Yankee Stadium**	—	0–0
49	May 18	Angels	—	—	—	—	**Yankee Stadium**	—	0–0
50	May 19	Angels	—	—	—	—	**Yankee Stadium**	—	0–0
51	May 20	Angels	—	—	—	—	**Yankee Stadium**	—	0–0
52	May 21	Giants	—	—	—	—	**Yankee Stadium**	—	0–0
53	May 22	Giants	—	—	—	—	**Yankee Stadium**	—	0–0
54	May 23	Giants	—	—	—	—	**Yankee Stadium**	—	0–0
55	May 25	@ Blue Jays	—	—	—	—	Rogers Centre	—	0–0
56	May 26	@ Blue Jays	—	—	—	—	Rogers Centre	—	0–0
57	May 27	@ Blue Jays	—	—	—	—	Rogers Centre	—	0–0
58	May 28	@ Mets	—	—	—	—	Citi Field	—	0–0
59	May 29	@ Mets	—	—	—	—	Citi Field	—	0–0
60	May 30	@ Mets	—	—	—	—	Citi Field	—	0–0
61	May 31	Royals	—	—	—	—	**Yankee Stadium**	—	0–0

June: 0–0 (Home: 0–0; Away: 0–0)

#	Date	Opponent	Score	Win	Loss	Save	Stadium	Attendance	Record
62	June 1	Royals	—	—	—	—	**Yankee Stadium**	—	0–0
63	June 2	Royals	—	—	—	—	**Yankee Stadium**	—	0–0
64	June 4	@ Red Sox	—	—	—	—	Fenway Park	—	0–0
65	June 5	@ Red Sox	—	—	—	—	Fenway Park	—	0–0
66	June 6	@ Red Sox	—	—	—	—	Fenway Park	—	0–0
67	June 7	@ Red Sox	—	—	—	—	Fenway Park	—	0–0
68	June 8	Orioles	—	—	—	—	**Yankee Stadium**	—	0–0
69	June 9	Orioles	—	—	—	—	**Yankee Stadium**	—	0–0
70	June 10	Orioles	—	—	—	—	**Yankee Stadium**	—	0–0
71	June 11	Red Sox	—	—	—	—	**Yankee Stadium**	—	0–0
72	June 12	Red Sox	—	—	—	—	**Yankee Stadium**	—	0–0
73	June 13	Red Sox	—	—	—	—	**Yankee Stadium**	—	0–0
74	June 15	@ Rays	—	—	—	—	Tropicana Field	—	0–0
75	June 16	@ Rays	—	—	—	—	Tropicana Field	—	0–0
76	June 17	@ Rays	—	—	—	—	Tropicana Field	—	0–0
77	June 18	@ Braves	—	—	—	—	Truist Park	—	0–0
78	June 19	@ Braves	—	—	—	—	Truist Park	—	0–0
79	June 20	@ Braves	—	—	—	—	Truist Park	—	0–0
80	June 21	@ Twins	—	—	—	—	Target Field	—	0–0
81	June 22	@ Twins	—	—	—	—	Target Field	—	0–0
82	June 23	@ Twins	—	—	—	—	Target Field	—	0–0
83	June 25	Tigers	—	—	—	—	**Yankee Stadium**	—	0–0
84	June 26	Tigers	—	—	—	—	**Yankee Stadium**	—	0–0
85	June 27	Tigers	—	—	—	—	**Yankee Stadium**	—	0–0
86	June 28	Mariners	—	—	—	—	**Yankee Stadium**	—	0–0
87	June 29	Mariners	—	—	—	—	**Yankee Stadium**	—	0–0
88	June 30	Mariners	—	—	—	—	**Yankee Stadium**	—	0–0

July: 0–0 (Home: 0–0; Away: 0–0)

#	Date	Opponent	Score	Win	Loss	Save	Stadium	Attendance	Record
89	July 1	Mariners	—	—	—	—	**Yankee Stadium**	—	0–0
90	July 2	Astros	—	—	—	—	**Yankee Stadium**	—	0–0
91	July 3	Astros	—	—	—	—	**Yankee Stadium**	—	0–0
92	July 4	Astros	—	—	—	—	**Yankee Stadium**	—	0–0
93	July 6	@ White Sox	—	—	—	—	Rate Field	—	0–0
94	July 7	@ White Sox	—	—	—	—	Rate Field	—	0–0
95	July 8	@ White Sox	—	—	—	—	Rate Field	—	0–0
96	July 9	@ Cardinals	—	—	—	—	Busch Stadium	—	0–0
97	July 10	@ Cardinals	—	—	—	—	Busch Stadium	—	0–0
98	July 11	@ Cardinals	—	—	—	—	Busch Stadium	—	0–0
**97th All-Star Game in Chicago, Illinois**
99	July 16	Mets	—	—	—	—	**Yankee Stadium**	—	0–0
100	July 17	Mets	—	—	—	—	**Yankee Stadium**	—	0–0
101	July 18	Mets	—	—	—	—	**Yankee Stadium**	—	0–0
102	July 19	Guardians	—	—	—	—	**Yankee Stadium**	—	0–0
103	July 20	Guardians	—	—	—	—	**Yankee Stadium**	—	0–0
104	July 21	Guardians	—	—	—	—	**Yankee Stadium**	—	0–0
105	July 23	@ Mariners	—	—	—	—	T-Mobile Park	—	0–0
106	July 24	@ Mariners	—	—	—	—	T-Mobile Park	—	0–0
107	July 25	@ Mariners	—	—	—	—	T-Mobile Park	—	0–0
108	July 26	@ Rockies	—	—	—	—	Coors Field	—	0–0
109	July 27	@ Rockies	—	—	—	—	Coors Field	—	0–0
110	July 28	@ Rockies	—	—	—	—	Coors Field	—	0–0
111	July 30	Blue Jays	—	—	—	—	**Yankee Stadium**	—	0–0
112	July 31	Blue Jays	—	—	—	—	**Yankee Stadium**	—	0–0

August: 0–0 (Home: 0–0; Away: 0–0)

#	Date	Opponent	Score	Win	Loss	Save	Stadium	Attendance	Record
113	August 1	Blue Jays	—	—	—	—	**Yankee Stadium**	—	0–0
114	August 2	Blue Jays	—	—	—	—	**Yankee Stadium**	—	0–0
115	August 3	Twins	—	—	—	—	**Yankee Stadium**	—	0–0
116	August 4	Twins	—	—	—	—	**Yankee Stadium**	—	0–0
117	August 5	Twins	—	—	—	—	**Yankee Stadium**	—	0–0
118	August 6	@ Red Sox	—	—	—	—	Fenway Park	—	0–0
119	August 7	@ Red Sox	—	—	—	—	Fenway Park	—	0–0
120	August 8	@ Red Sox	—	—	—	—	Fenway Park	—	0–0
121	August 9	@ Rays	—	—	—	—	Tropicana Field	—	0–0
122	August 10	@ Rays	—	—	—	—	Tropicana Field	—	0–0
123	August 11	@ Rays	—	—	—	—	Tropicana Field	—	0–0
124	August 13	@ Reds	—	—	—	—	Great American Ball Park	—	0–0
125	August 14	@ Reds	—	—	—	—	Great American Ball Park	—	0–0
126	August 15	@ Reds	—	—	—	—	Great American Ball Park	—	0–0
127	August 16	Orioles	—	—	—	—	**Yankee Stadium**	—	0–0
128	August 17	Orioles	—	—	—	—	**Yankee Stadium**	—	0–0
129	August 18	Orioles	—	—	—	—	**Yankee Stadium**	—	0–0
130	August 20	Rangers	—	—	—	—	**Yankee Stadium**	—	0–0
131	August 21	Rangers	—	—	—	—	**Yankee Stadium**	—	0–0
132	August 22	Rangers	—	—	—	—	**Yankee Stadium**	—	0–0
133	August 24	@ Angels	—	—	—	—	Angel Stadium	—	0–0
134	August 25	@ Angels	—	—	—	—	Angel Stadium	—	0–0
135	August 26	@ Angels	—	—	—	—	Angel Stadium	—	0–0
136	August 27	@ Dodgers	—	—	—	—	Dodger Stadium	—	0–0
137	August 28	@ Dodgers	—	—	—	—	Dodger Stadium	—	0–0
138	August 29	@ Dodgers	—	—	—	—	Dodger Stadium	—	0–0
139	August 31	Padres	—	—	—	—	**Yankee Stadium**	—	0–0

September: 0–0 (Home: 0–0; Away: 0–0)

#	Date	Opponent	Score	Win	Loss	Save	Stadium	Attendance	Record
140	September 1	Padres	—	—	—	—	**Yankee Stadium**	—	0–0
141	September 2	Padres	—	—	—	—	**Yankee Stadium**	—	0–0
142	September 3	Rays	—	—	—	—	**Yankee Stadium**	—	0–0
143	September 4	Rays	—	—	—	—	**Yankee Stadium**	—	0–0
144	September 5	Rays	—	—	—	—	**Yankee Stadium**	—	0–0
145	September 6	@ Rangers	—	—	—	—	Globe Life Field	—	0–0
146	September 7	@ Rangers	—	—	—	—	Globe Life Field	—	0–0
147	September 8	@ Rangers	—	—	—	—	Globe Life Field	—	0–0
148	September 10	@ Athletics	—	—	—	—	Sutter Health Park	—	0–0
149	September 11	@ Athletics	—	—	—	—	Sutter Health Park	—	0–0
150	September 12	@ Athletics	—	—	—	—	Sutter Health Park	—	0–0
151	September 14	White Sox	—	—	—	—	**Yankee Stadium**	—	0–0
152	September 15	White Sox	—	—	—	—	**Yankee Stadium**	—	0–0
153	September 16	White Sox	—	—	—	—	**Yankee Stadium**	—	0–0
154	September 17	Red Sox	—	—	—	—	**Yankee Stadium**	—	0–0
155	September 18	Red Sox	—	—	—	—	**Yankee Stadium**	—	0–0
156	September 19	Red Sox	—	—	—	—	**Yankee Stadium**	—	0–0
157	September 21	@ Blue Jays	—	—	—	—	Rogers Centre	—	0–0
158	September 22	@ Blue Jays	—	—	—	—	Rogers Centre	—	0–0
159	September 23	@ Blue Jays	—	—	—	—	Rogers Centre	—	0–0
160	September 24	@ Orioles	—	—	—	—	Camden Yards	—	0–0
161	September 25	@ Orioles	—	—	—	—	Camden Yards	—	0–0
162	September 26	@ Orioles	—	—	—	—	Camden Yards	—	0–0

== Current roster ==
New York Yankees 2027 spring training roster
40-man roster		Non-roster invitees	Coaches / other
Pitchers: 89 Brendan Beck; 53 David Bednar; -- Kyle Carr; 74 Kervin Castro; 57 Angel Chivilli; 45 Gerrit Cole; 73 Yerry De Los Santos; 54 Max Fried; -- Chase Hampton; 93 Bradley Hanner; 47 Brent Headrick; -- Carlos Lagrange; 55 Carlos Rodón; 71 Elmer Rodríguez; 36 Clarke Schmidt; 31 Cam Schlittler; 29 Will Warren; 40 Ryan Weathers	Catchers: 25 J. C. Escarra; 39 Ali Sánchez; 28 Austin Wells; Infielders: 72 José Caballero; 26 Luis García Jr.; 96 George Lombard Jr.; -- Marco Luciano; 19 Ryan McMahon; 11 Anthony Volpe; Outfielders: 35 Cody Bellinger; 24 Jasson Domínguez; 78 Spencer Jones; 99 Aaron Judge; -- Garrett Martin; 34 Heliot Ramos; 30 Max Schuemann; Designated hitters: 22 Ben Rice; 27 Giancarlo Stanton	Outfielders: -- Allan Castro	Manager: 17 Aaron Boone; Coaches: 77 Matt Blake (pitching); 79 Preston Claiborne (bullpen/assistant pitching); -- Rainiero Coa (bullpen catcher); 83 Desi Druschel (assistant pitching); 78 Casey Dykes (assistant hitting); 85 Dan Fiorito (first base/infield); 84 Jake Hirst (assistant hitting); 67 Luis Rojas (third base/outfield); -- Peter Serruto (bullpen catcher); -- Aaron Gershenfeld (field coordinator/catching); Vacant (hitting); Vacant (bench); 36 active, 0 inactive, 1 non-roster invitees; 7-, 10-, or 15-day injured list; * Not on active roster; ^{†} Suspended list; Roster, coaches, and NRIs updated November 20, 2026; Transactions • Depth chart; → All MLB rosters

== Farm system ==
Level	Team	League	Manager
AAA	Scranton/Wilkes-Barre Highlanders	International League	
AA	Somerset Patriots	Eastern League	
High-A	Hudson Valley Renegades	South Atlantic League	
Low-A	Tampa Tarpons	Florida State League	
Rookie	FCL Yankees	Florida Complex League	
Rookie	DSL NYY Bombers	Dominican Summer League	
Rookie	DSL NYY Yankees	Dominican Summer League	
