= 2027 Detroit Tigers season =

Major League Baseball season

2027 Detroit Tigers
- League: American League
- Division: Central
- Ballpark: Fifth Third Park
- City: Detroit, Michigan
- Owners: Christopher Ilitch; Ilitch family trust
- President of baseball operations: Scott Harris
- General manager: Jeff Greenberg
- Manager: A. J. Hinch
- Television: MLB Local Media; Jason Benetti/Dan Dickerson (play-by-play); Andy Dirks/Dan Petry/Todd Jones/Carlos Peña (color commentary); Daniella Bruce (reporter); Johnny Kane (host)
- Radio: Detroit Tigers Radio Network; Dan Dickerson/Greg Gania (play-by-play); Bobby Scales/Dan Petry/Andy Dirks (color commentary)
- Stats: ESPN.com; Baseball Reference

The 2027 Detroit Tigers season is scheduled to be the team's 127th season and its 28th at Fifth Third Park. This will be the Tigers' seventh season under manager A. J. Hinch. The Tigers would hope to improve on their 76–86 record from 2026, return to the playoffs after a one-year absence, and end their 12-year AL Central title drought.

The season is contingent on Major League Baseball (MLB) and the Major League Baseball Players Association (MLBPA) signing a new collective bargaining agreement (CBA). Without a new CBA, MLB is expected to lock out the players on December 2, 2026, until one is signed. If such a lockout extends indefinitely, the season could be postponed, shortened, or even cancelled.

== Roster moves ==
=== Trades ===
- On October 29, 2026, the Tigers acquired infielder Tsung-Che Cheng from the Boston Red Sox for cash considerations.
- On November 18, 2026, the Tigers traded infielder Jace Jung to the Los Angeles Angels for cash considerations.

=== Releases ===
- On October 2, 2026, minor league pitcher Tanner Rainey elected free agency.
- On October 29, 2026, pitchers Justin Verlander, Jack Flaherty, Burch Smith, Tyler Kinley, and Jacob Waguespack along with infielder Gleyber Torres elected free agency. Verlander announced that he would retire at the end of the season back in July.
- On November 2, 2026, the Tigers declined the $12 million 2027 club option on RHP Kenley Jansen, paying the $2 million buyout and making him a free agent.
- Also on November 2, 2026, the Tigers activated RHPs Reese Olson and Will Vest, infielder Trey Sweeney, and outfielders Kerry Carpenter, Parker Meadows, Wenceel Pérez and Matt Vierling from the 60-day injured list. To make room on the 40-man roster, the team released RHP Sawyer Gipson-Long and LHP Bailey Horn while designating RHP Yilber Diaz for assignment. The Tigers also outrighted outfielder Corey Julks to the Triple-A Toledo Mud Hens but he opted to elect free agency. On November 6, Diaz cleared waivers and was sent outright to Triple-A Toledo.
- On November 17, 2026, the Tigers designated pitcher Jake Miller for assignment along with infielders Jace Jung, Trey Sweeney and outfielder Matt Vierling. Jung was traded the next day. Miller, Sweeney and Vierling were not tendered a contract and became free agents on November 20.

=== Signings ===
- On November 2, 2026, the Tigers exercised their $10 million 2027 club option on RHP Drew Anderson, and also re-signed RHP Jacob Waguespack to a one-year $1.3 million contract with an additional $200,000 in innings-based bonus money.
- On November 16, 2026, the Tigers resigned pitchers Bailey Horn and Sawyer Gibson-Long to minor league contracts.
- On November 17, 2026, the Tigers selected the contracts of catcher Josue Briceño, and infielders Max Anderson and Peyton Graham to protect them from the Rule 5 draft. They also signed pitcher Emilio Pagán to a one-year $11.5 million contract with additional $1 million in incentives.

== Game log ==
The 2027 schedule is tentative until a new collective bargaining agreement (CBA) is signed between Major League Baseball (MLB) and the Major League Baseball Players Association (MLBPA). If the labor dispute extends into late February or early March, MLB would then start to consider whether to postpone or shorten the season.

=== Regular season ===
2027 Game Log: 0–0 (Home 0–0, Road 0–0)
March/April: 0–0 (Home 0–0, Road 0–0)

#	Date	Opponent	Score	Win	Loss	Save	Attendance	Record	Streak
1	March 25	White Sox	—	—	—	—	—	–	—
2	March 27	White Sox	—	—	—	—	—	–	—
3	March 28	White Sox	—	—	—	—	—	–	—
4	March 29	Guardians	—	—	—	—	—	–	—
5	March 30	Guardians	—	—	—	—	—	–	—
6	March 31	Guardians	—	—	—	—	—	–	—
7	April 2	@ Orioles	—	—	—	—	—	–	—
8	April 3	@ Orioles	—	—	—	—	—	–	—
9	April 4	@ Orioles	—	—	—	—	—	–	—
10	April 6	@ Phillies	—	—	—	—	—	–	—
11	April 7	@ Phillies	—	—	—	—	—	–	—
12	April 8	@ Phillies	—	—	—	—	—	–	—
13	April 9	Mets	—	—	—	—	—	–	—
14	April 10	Mets	—	—	—	—	—	–	—
15	April 11	Mets	—	—	—	—	—	–	—
16	April 13	Yankees	—	—	—	—	—	–	—
17	April 14	Yankees	—	—	—	—	—	–	—
18	April 15	Yankees	—	—	—	—	—	–	—
19	April 16	@ Twins	—	—	—	—	—	–	—
20	April 17	@ Twins	—	—	—	—	—	–	—
21	April 18	@ Twins	—	—	—	—	—	–	—
22	April 19	@ White Sox	—	—	—	—	—	–	—
23	April 20	@ White Sox	—	—	—	—	—	–	—
24	April 21	@ White Sox	—	—	—	—	—	–	—
25	April 22	@ White Sox	—	—	—	—	—	–	—
26	April 23	Red Sox	—	—	—	—	—	–	—
27	April 24	Red Sox	—	—	—	—	—	–	—
28	April 25	Red Sox	—	—	—	—	—	–	—
29	April 27	Diamondbacks	—	—	—	—	—	–	—
30	April 28	Diamondbacks	—	—	—	—	—	–	—
31	April 29	Diamondbacks	—	—	—	—	—	–	—
32	April 30	@ Dodgers	—	—	—	—	—	–	—

May: 0–0 (Home 0–0, Road 0–0)

#	Date	Opponent	Score	Win	Loss	Save	Attendance	Record	Streak
33	May 1	@ Dodgers	—	—	—	—	—	–	—
34	May 2	@ Dodgers	—	—	—	—	—	–	—
35	May 3	@ Rockies	—	—	—	—	—	–	—
36	May 4	@ Rockies	—	—	—	—	—	–	—
37	May 5	@ Rockies	—	—	—	—	—	–	—
38	May 7	Padres	—	—	—	—	—	–	—
39	May 8	Padres	—	—	—	—	—	–	—
40	May 9	Padres	—	—	—	—	—	–	—
41	May 11	Braves	—	—	—	—	—	–	—
42	May 12	Braves	—	—	—	—	—	–	—
43	May 13	Braves	—	—	—	—	—	–	—
44	May 14	@ Rangers	—	—	—	—	—	–	—
45	May 15	@ Rangers	—	—	—	—	—	–	—
46	May 16	@ Rangers	—	—	—	—	—	–	—
47	May 18	Giants	—	—	—	—	—	–	—
48	May 19	Giants	—	—	—	—	—	–	—
49	May 20	Giants	—	—	—	—	—	–	—
50	May 21	@ Cardinals	—	—	—	—	—	–	—
51	May 22	@ Cardinals	—	—	—	—	—	–	—
52	May 23	@ Cardinals	—	—	—	—	—	–	—
53	May 24	@ Marlins	—	—	—	—	—	–	—
54	May 25	@ Marlins	—	—	—	—	—	–	—
55	May 26	@ Marlins	—	—	—	—	—	–	—
56	May 28	Royals	—	—	—	—	—	–	—
57	May 29	Royals	—	—	—	—	—	–	—
58	May 30	Royals	—	—	—	—	—	–	—
59	May 31	Twins	—	—	—	—	—	–	—

June: 0–0 (Home 0–0, Road 0–0)

#	Date	Opponent	Score	Win	Loss	Save	Attendance	Record	Streak
60	June 1	Twins	—	—	—	—	—	–	—
61	June 2	Twins	—	—	—	—	—	–	—
62	June 4	@ Royals	—	—	—	—	—	–	—
63	June 5	@ Royals	—	—	—	—	—	–	—
64	June 6	@ Royals	—	—	—	—	—	–	—
65	June 7	@ Guardians	—	—	—	—	—	–	—
66	June 8	@ Guardians	—	—	—	—	—	–	—
67	June 9	@ Guardians	—	—	—	—	—	–	—
68	June 10	@ Guardians	—	—	—	—	—	–	—
69	June 11	Astros	—	—	—	—	—	–	—
70	June 12	Astros	—	—	—	—	—	–	—
71	June 13	Astros	—	—	—	—	—	–	—
72	June 14	Mariners	—	—	—	—	—	–	—
73	June 15	Mariners	—	—	—	—	—	–	—
74	June 16	Mariners	—	—	—	—	—	–	—
75	June 18	Blue Jays	—	—	—	—	—	–	—
76	June 19	Blue Jays	—	—	—	—	—	–	—
77	June 20	Blue Jays	—	—	—	—	—	–	—
78	June 22	@ Pirates	—	—	—	—	—	–	—
79	June 23	@ Pirates	—	—	—	—	—	–	—
80	June 24	@ Pirates	—	—	—	—	—	–	—
81	June 25	@ Yankees	—	—	—	—	—	–	—
82	June 26	@ Yankees	—	—	—	—	—	–	—
83	June 27	@ Yankees	—	—	—	—	—	–	—
84	June 29	Guardians	—	—	—	—	—	–	—
85	June 30	Guardians	—	—	—	—	—	–	—

July: 0–0 (Home 0–0, Road 0–0)

#	Date	Opponent	Score	Win	Loss	Save	Attendance	Record	Streak
86	July 1	Guardians	—	—	—	—	—	–	—
87	July 2	@ Royals	—	—	—	—	—	–	—
88	July 3	@ Royals	—	—	—	—	—	–	—
89	July 4	@ Royals	—	—	—	—	—	–	—
90	July 5	Orioles	—	—	—	—	—	–	—
91	July 6	Orioles	—	—	—	—	—	–	—
92	July 7	Orioles	—	—	—	—	—	–	—
93	July 8	Orioles	—	—	—	—	—	–	—
94	July 9	Cubs	—	—	—	—	—	–	—
95	July 10	Cubs	—	—	—	—	—	–	—
96	July 11	Cubs	—	—	—	—	—	–	—
**97th All-Star Game in Chicago, IL**
97	July 16	@ Blue Jays	—	—	—	—	—	–	—
98	July 17	@ Blue Jays	—	—	—	—	—	–	—
99	July 18	@ Blue Jays	—	—	—	—	—	–	—
100	July 19	@ Brewers	—	—	—	—	—	–	—
101	July 20	@ Brewers	—	—	—	—	—	–	—
102	July 21	@ Brewers	—	—	—	—	—	–	—
103	July 23	Reds	—	—	—	—	—	–	—
104	July 24	Reds	—	—	—	—	—	–	—
105	July 25	Reds	—	—	—	—	—	–	—
106	July 26	@ Astros	—	—	—	—	—	–	—
107	July 27	@ Astros	—	—	—	—	—	–	—
108	July 28	@ Astros	—	—	—	—	—	–	—
109	July 29	@ Astros	—	—	—	—	—	–	—
110	July 30	Angels	—	—	—	—	—	–	—
111	July 31	Angels	—	—	—	—	—	–	—

August: 0–0 (Home 0–0, Road 0–0)

#	Date	Opponent	Score	Win	Loss	Save	Attendance	Record	Streak
112	August 1	Angels	—	—	—	—	—	–	—
113	August 3	White Sox	—	—	—	—	—	–	—
114	August 4	White Sox	—	—	—	—	—	–	—
115	August 5	White Sox	—	—	—	—	—	–	—
116	August 6	@ Angels	—	—	—	—	—	–	—
117	August 7	@ Angels	—	—	—	—	—	–	—
118	August 8	@ Angels	—	—	—	—	—	–	—
119	August 10	@ Athletics	—	—	—	—	—	–	—
120	August 11	@ Athletics	—	—	—	—	—	–	—
121	August 12	@ Athletics	—	—	—	—	—	–	—
122	August 13	@ Mariners	—	—	—	—	—	–	—
123	August 14	@ Mariners	—	—	—	—	—	–	—
124	August 15	@ Mariners	—	—	—	—	—	–	—
125	August 17	Rays	—	—	—	—	—	–	—
126	August 18	Rays	—	—	—	—	—	–	—
127	August 19	Rays	—	—	—	—	—	–	—
128	August 20	Royals	—	—	—	—	—	–	—
129	August 21	Royals	—	—	—	—	—	–	—
130	August 22	Royals	—	—	—	—	—	–	—
131	August 23	Royals	—	—	—	—	—	–	—
132	August 24	@ Rays	—	—	—	—	—	–	—
133	August 25	@ Rays	—	—	—	—	—	–	—
134	August 26	@ Rays	—	—	—	—	—	–	—
135	August 27	@ Nationals	—	—	—	—	—	–	—
136	August 28	@ Nationals	—	—	—	—	—	–	—
137	August 29	@ Nationals	—	—	—	—	—	–	—
138	August 31	Pirates	—	—	—	—	—	–	—

September: 0–0 (Home 0–0, Road 0–0)

#	Date	Opponent	Score	Win	Loss	Save	Attendance	Record	Streak
139	September 1	Pirates	—	—	—	—	—	–	—
140	September 2	Pirates	—	—	—	—	—	–	—
141	September 3	Rangers	—	—	—	—	—	–	—
142	September 4	Rangers	—	—	—	—	—	–	—
143	September 5	Rangers	—	—	—	—	—	–	—
144	September 6	@ Guardians	—	—	—	—	—	–	—
145	September 7	@ Guardians	—	—	—	—	—	–	—
146	September 8	@ Guardians	—	—	—	—	—	–	—
147	September 10	@ Red Sox	—	—	—	—	—	–	—
148	September 11	@ Red Sox	—	—	—	—	—	–	—
149	September 12	@ Red Sox	—	—	—	—	—	–	—
150	September 13	Twins	—	—	—	—	—	–	—
151	September 14	Twins	—	—	—	—	—	–	—
152	September 15	Twins	—	—	—	—	—	–	—
153	September 16	Twins	—	—	—	—	—	–	—
154	September 17	Athletics	—	—	—	—	—	–	—
155	September 18	Athletics	—	—	—	—	—	–	—
156	September 19	Athletics	—	—	—	—	—	–	—
157	September 20	@ White Sox	—	—	—	—	—	–	—
158	September 21	@ White Sox	—	—	—	—	—	–	—
159	September 22	@ White Sox	—	—	—	—	—	–	—
160	September 24	@ Twins	—	—	—	—	—	–	—
161	September 25	@ Twins	—	—	—	—	—	–	—
162	September 26	@ Twins	—	—	—	—	—	–	—

Legend: = Win = Loss = Postponement
Bold = Tigers team member

== Current roster ==
Detroit Tigers 2027 spring training roster
40-man roster		Non-roster invitees	Coaches / other
Pitchers: 38 Drew Anderson; 4 Beau Brieske; 37 Enmanuel De Jesus; 67 Kyle Finnegan; 75 Brenan Hanifee; 87 Tyler Holton; 48 Brant Hurter; 21 Jackson Jobe; 36 Ty Madden; 52 Troy Melton; 54 Keider Montero; 45 Reese Olson; -- Emilio Pagán; 77 River Ryan; 64 Andrew Sears; 51 Drew Sommers; 59 Framber Valdez; 19 Will Vest; 58 Jacob Waguespack	Catchers: -- Josue Briceño; 13 Dillon Dingler; 49 Thayron Liranzo; Infielders: -- Max Anderson; 28 Javier Báez; -- Tsung-Che Cheng; -- Peyton Graham; 33 Colt Keith; 50 Hao-Yu Lee; 7 Kevin McGonigle; 18 John Peck; 20 Spencer Torkelson; Outfielders: 34 Brett Callahan; 30 Kerry Carpenter; 15 Max Clark; 31 Riley Greene; 53 Ben Malgeri; 39 Zach McKinstry; 22 Parker Meadows; 46 Wenceel Pérez; Designated hitters: 32 Eduardo Valencia	Pitchers: -- Sawyer Gipson-Long; -- Bailey Horn; -- Anderson Pilar; Catchers: -- Carlos Pérez	Manager: 14 A. J. Hinch; Coaches: 92 Cody Asche (assistant hitting); 88 Billy Boyer (third base); 90 Michael Brdar (hitting); 98 Chris Chinea (bullpen catcher); 41 Chris Fetter (pitching); -- Kyle Hudson (first base); 26 George Lombard (bench); 63 Robin Lund (assistant pitching)}; 97 Tim Remes (bullpen catcher); 83 Ryan Sienko (catching); 91 Lance Zawadzki (assistant hitting); 40 active, 0 inactive, 3 non-roster invitees; 7-, 10-, or 15-day injured list; * Not on active roster; ^{†} Suspended list; Roster, coaches, and NRIs updated November 19, 2026; Transactions • Depth chart; → All MLB rosters

== Farm system ==
Level	Team	League	Manager
AAA	Toledo Mud Hens	International League	
AA	Erie SeaWolves	Eastern League	
High-A	West Michigan Whitecaps	Midwest League	
Single-A	Lakeland Flying Tigers	Florida State League	
Rookie	Florida Complex League Tigers	Florida Complex League	
Rookie	DSL Tigers 1	Dominican Summer League	
Rookie	DSL Tigers 2	Dominican Summer League	
