= 2027 Los Angeles Angels season =

2027 Los Angeles Angels
- League: American League
- Division: West
- Ballpark: Angel Stadium
- City: Anaheim, California
- Owner: Stan Kroenke
- General manager: TBA
- Manager: TBA
- Television: ABTV
- Radio: KLAA (AM 830); KSPN (AM 710); Angels Radio Network; Spanish: KWKW (AM 1330)
- Stats: ESPN.com; Baseball Reference

The 2027 Los Angeles Angels season is scheduled to be the 67th season of the Angels franchise in the American League, the 62nd in Anaheim, their 62nd season playing their home games at Angel Stadium, and their first season under new owner Stan Kroenke, ending Arte Moreno's tenure after 23 seasons since the 2003 MLB season. The Angels would look to improve on their franchise-worst 62–100 record from last year and make the playoffs after a 12-year absence; the longest active playoff drought in Major League Baseball.

The season is contingent on Major League Baseball (MLB) and the Major League Baseball Players Association (MLBPA) signing a new collective bargaining agreement (CBA). Without a new CBA, MLB is expected to lock out the players on December 2, 2026, until one is signed. If such a lockout extends indefinitely, the season could be postponed, shortened, or even cancelled.

== Transactions ==
=== October 2026 ===
October 7	3B Jeimer Candelario elected free agency
October 29	2B Adam Frazier elected free agency
October 29	3B Anthony Rendon elected free agency
October 29	3B Yoan Moncada elected free agency
October 29	C Travis d'Arnaud elected free agency
October 29	New York Mets claimed 2B Kyren Paris off waivers from Los Angeles Angels
October 30	Los Angeles Angels selected the contract of P Nicolo Pinazzi from Double-A Rocket City Trash Pandas
October 30	P Robert Stephenson elected free agency
October 30	Los Angeles Angels activated Jack Kochanowicz from the 60-day injured list

== Game log ==
The 2027 schedule is tentative until a new collective bargaining agreement (CBA) is signed between Major League Baseball (MLB) and the Major League Baseball Players Association (MLBPA). If the labor dispute extends into late February or early March, MLB would then start to consider whether to postpone or shorten the season.

The Angels are originally scheduled to open the season on the road at the Brewers.

Legend
	Angels win
	Angels loss
	All-Star Game
	Postponement
**Bold**	Angels team member

2027 Game Log: 0–0 (Home: 0–0; Road: 0–0)
March/April: 0–0 (Home: 0–0; Road: 0–0)

#	Date	Opponent	Score	Win	Loss	Save	Attendance	Record	Streak
1	March 25	@ Brewers	—	—	—	—	—	–	—
2	March 27	@ Brewers	—	—	—	—	—	–	—
3	March 28	@ Brewers	—	—	—	—	—	–	—
4	March 29	@ Rays	—	—	—	—	—	–	—
5	March 30	@ Rays	—	—	—	—	—	–	—
6	March 31	@ Rays	—	—	—	—	—	–	—
7	April 2	Cubs	—	—	—	—	—	–	—
8	April 3	Cubs	—	—	—	—	—	–	—
9	April 4	Cubs	—	—	—	—	—	–	—
10	April 5	Royals	—	—	—	—	—	–	—
11	April 6	Royals	—	—	—	—	—	–	—
12	April 7	Royals	—	—	—	—	—	–	—
13	April 9	@ Orioles	—	—	—	—	—	–	—
14	April 10	@ Orioles	—	—	—	—	—	–	—
15	April 11	@ Orioles	—	—	—	—	—	–	—
16	April 12	@ Orioles	—	—	—	—	—	–	—
17	April 13	@ Mets	—	—	—	—	—	–	—
18	April 14	@ Mets	—	—	—	—	—	–	—
19	April 15	@ Mets	—	—	—	—	—	–	—
20	April 16	Orioles	—	—	—	—	—	–	—
21	April 17	Orioles	—	—	—	—	—	–	—
22	April 18	Orioles	—	—	—	—	—	–	—
23	April 19	Astros	—	—	—	—	—	–	—
24	April 20	Astros	—	—	—	—	—	–	—
25	April 21	Astros	—	—	—	—	—	–	—
26	April 23	White Sox	—	—	—	—	—	–	—
27	April 24	White Sox	—	—	—	—	—	–	—
28	April 25	White Sox	—	—	—	—	—	–	—
29	April 26	@ Astros	—	—	—	—	—	–	—
30	April 27	@ Astros	—	—	—	—	—	–	—
31	April 28	@ Astros	—	—	—	—	—	–	—
32	April 30	@ White Sox	—	—	—	—	—	–	—

May: 0–0 (Home: 0–0; Road: 0–0)

#	Date	Opponent	Score	Win	Loss	Save	Attendance	Record	Streak
33	May 1	@ White Sox	—	—	—	—	—	–	—
34	May 2	@ White Sox	—	—	—	—	—	–	—
35	May 3	Twins	—	—	—	—	—	–	—
36	May 4	Twins	—	—	—	—	—	–	—
37	May 5	Twins	—	—	—	—	—	–	—
38	May 6	Twins	—	—	—	—	—	–	—
39	May 7	@ Athletics	—	—	—	—	—	–	—
40	May 8	@ Athletics	—	—	—	—	—	–	—
41	May 9	@ Athletics	—	—	—	—	—	–	—
42	May 10	Mariners	—	—	—	—	—	–	—
43	May 11	Mariners	—	—	—	—	—	–	—
44	May 12	Mariners	—	—	—	—	—	–	—
45	May 14	Athletics	—	—	—	—	—	–	—
46	May 15	Athletics	—	—	—	—	—	–	—
47	May 16	Athletics	—	—	—	—	—	–	—
48	May 18	@ Yankees	—	—	—	—	—	–	—
49	May 19	@ Yankees	—	—	—	—	—	–	—
50	May 20	@ Yankees	—	—	—	—	—	–	—
51	May 21	@ Phillies	—	—	—	—	—	–	—
52	May 22	@ Phillies	—	—	—	—	—	–	—
53	May 23	@ Phillies	—	—	—	—	—	–	—
54	May 24	@ Guardians	—	—	—	—	—	–	—
55	May 25	@ Guardians	—	—	—	—	—	–	—
56	May 26	@ Guardians	—	—	—	—	—	–	—
57	May 28	Dodgers	—	—	—	—	—	–	—
58	May 29	Dodgers	—	—	—	—	—	–	—
59	May 30	Dodgers	—	—	—	—	—	–	—
60	May 31	Red Sox	—	—	—	—	—	–	—

June: 0–0 (Home: 0–0; Road: 0–0)

#	Date	Opponent	Score	Win	Loss	Save	Attendance	Record	Streak
61	June 1	Red Sox	—	—	—	—	—	–	—
62	June 2	Red Sox	—	—	—	—	—	–	—
63	June 4	Rangers	—	—	—	—	—	–	—
64	June 5	Rangers	—	—	—	—	—	–	—
65	June 6	Rangers	—	—	—	—	—	–	—
66	June 7	@ Twins	—	—	—	—	—	–	—
67	June 8	@ Twins	—	—	—	—	—	–	—
68	June 9	@ Twins	—	—	—	—	—	–	—
69	June 11	@ Rangers	—	—	—	—	—	–	—
70	June 12	@ Rangers	—	—	—	—	—	–	—
71	June 13	@ Rangers	—	—	—	—	—	–	—
72	June 14	Pirates	—	—	—	—	—	–	—
73	June 15	Pirates	—	—	—	—	—	–	—
74	June 16	Pirates	—	—	—	—	—	–	—
75	June 17	@ Mariners	—	—	—	—	—	–	—
76	June 18	@ Mariners	—	—	—	—	—	–	—
77	June 19	@ Mariners	—	—	—	—	—	–	—
78	June 20	@ Mariners	—	—	—	—	—	–	—
79	June 21	Reds	—	—	—	—	—	–	—
80	June 22	Reds	—	—	—	—	—	–	—
81	June 23	Reds	—	—	—	—	—	–	—
82	June 25	Rays	—	—	—	—	—	–	—
83	June 26	Rays	—	—	—	—	—	–	—
84	June 27	Rays	—	—	—	—	—	–	—
85	June 29	@ Blue Jays	—	—	—	—	—	–	—
86	June 30	@ Blue Jays	—	—	—	—	—	–	—

July: 0–0 (Home: 0–0; Road: 0–0)

#	Date	Opponent	Score	Win	Loss	Save	Attendance	Record	Streak
87	July 1	@ Blue Jays	—	—	—	—	—	–	—
88	July 2	@ Braves	—	—	—	—	—	–	—
89	July 3	@ Braves	—	—	—	—	—	–	—
90	July 4	@ Braves	—	—	—	—	—	–	—
91	July 5	Rangers	—	—	—	—	—	–	—
92	July 6	Rangers	—	—	—	—	—	–	—
93	July 7	Rangers	—	—	—	—	—	–	—
94	July 8	Rangers	—	—	—	—	—	–	—
95	July 9	Blue Jays	—	—	—	—	—	–	—
96	July 10	Blue Jays	—	—	—	—	—	–	—
97	July 11	Blue Jays	—	—	—	—	—	–	—
ASG	July 13	AL @ NL	—	—	—	—	—	―	―
98	July 16	@ Dodgers	—	—	—	—	—	–	—
99	July 17	@ Dodgers	—	—	—	—	—	–	—
100	July 18	@ Dodgers	—	—	—	—	—	–	—
101	July 19	@ Padres	—	—	—	—	—	–	—
102	July 20	@ Padres	—	—	—	—	—	–	—
103	July 21	@ Padres	—	—	—	—	—	–	—
104	July 22	Athletics	—	—	—	—	—	–	—
105	July 23	Athletics	—	—	—	—	—	–	—
106	July 24	Athletics	—	—	—	—	—	–	—
107	July 25	Athletics	—	—	—	—	—	–	—
108	July 26	Giants	—	—	—	—	—	–	—
109	July 27	Giants	—	—	—	—	—	–	—
110	July 28	Giants	—	—	—	—	—	–	—
111	July 30	@ Tigers	—	—	—	—	—	–	—
112	July 31	@ Tigers	—	—	—	—	—	–	—

August: 0–0 (Home: 0–0; Road: 0–0)

#	Date	Opponent	Score	Win	Loss	Save	Attendance	Record	Streak
113	August 1	@ Tigers	—	—	—	—	—	–	—
114	August 2	@ Red Sox	—	—	—	—	—	–	—
115	August 3	@ Red Sox	—	—	—	—	—	–	—
116	August 4	@ Red Sox	—	—	—	—	—	–	—
117	August 6	Tigers	—	—	—	—	—	–	—
118	August 7	Tigers	—	—	—	—	—	–	—
119	August 8	Tigers	—	—	—	—	—	–	—
120	August 9	Marlins	—	—	—	—	—	–	—
121	August 10	Marlins	—	—	—	—	—	–	—
122	August 11	Marlins	—	—	—	—	—	–	—
123	August 13	@ Athletics	—	—	—	—	—	–	—
124	August 14	@ Athletics	—	—	—	—	—	–	—
125	August 15	@ Athletics	—	—	—	—	—	–	—
126	August 16	@ Mariners	—	—	—	—	—	–	—
127	August 17	@ Mariners	—	—	—	—	—	–	—
128	August 18	@ Mariners	—	—	—	—	—	–	—
129	August 20	@ Cardinals	—	—	—	—	—	–	—
130	August 21	@ Cardinals	—	—	—	—	—	–	—
131	August 22	@ Cardinals	—	—	—	—	—	–	—
132	August 24	Yankees	—	—	—	—	—	–	—
133	August 25	Yankees	—	—	—	—	—	–	—
134	August 26	Yankees	—	—	—	—	—	–	—
135	August 27	Guardians	—	—	—	—	—	–	—
136	August 28	Guardians	—	—	—	—	—	–	—
137	August 29	Guardians	—	—	—	—	—	–	—
138	August 31	@ Rockies	—	—	—	—	—	–	—

September: 0–0 (Home: 0–0; Road: 0–0)

#	Date	Opponent	Score	Win	Loss	Save	Attendance	Record	Streak
139	September 1	@ Rockies	—	—	—	—	—	–	—
140	September 2	@ Rockies	—	—	—	—	—	–	—
141	September 3	Diamondbacks	—	—	—	—	—	–	—
142	September 4	Diamondbacks	—	—	—	—	—	–	—
143	September 5	Diamondbacks	—	—	—	—	—	–	—
144	September 6	Nationals	—	—	—	—	—	–	—
145	September 7	Nationals	—	—	—	—	—	–	—
146	September 8	Nationals	—	—	—	—	—	–	—
147	September 10	@ Rangers	—	—	—	—	—	–	—
148	September 11	@ Rangers	—	—	—	—	—	–	—
149	September 12	@ Rangers	—	—	—	—	—	–	—
150	September 13	@ Astros	—	—	—	—	—	–	—
151	September 14	@ Astros	—	—	—	—	—	–	—
152	September 15	@ Astros	—	—	—	—	—	–	—
153	September 16	@ Astros	—	—	—	—	—	–	—
154	September 17	@ Royals	—	—	—	—	—	–	—
155	September 18	@ Royals	—	—	—	—	—	–	—
156	September 19	@ Royals	—	—	—	—	—	–	—
157	September 21	Mariners	—	—	—	—	—	–	—
158	September 22	Mariners	—	—	—	—	—	–	—
159	September 23	Mariners	—	—	—	—	—	–	—
160	September 24	Astros	—	—	—	—	—	–	—
161	September 25	Astros	—	—	—	—	—	–	—
162	September 26	Astros	—	—	—	—	—	–	—

== Roster ==
Los Angeles Angels 2027 spring training roster
40-man roster		Non-roster invitees	Coaches / other
Pitchers: 61 Sam Aldegheri; 40 Sam Bachman; 36 Caden Dana; 48 Reid Detmers; 70 Mitch Farris; 65 José Fermín; 32 Ryan Johnson; 44 Ben Joyce; 71 Brett Kerry; 16 Yusei Kikuchi; 58 George Klassen; 41 Jack Kochanowicz; 54 Trevor Martin; 72 Luke Murphy; 52 Samy Natera Jr.; -- Nicolò Pinazzi; 21 Grayson Rodriguez; 55 Tayler Saucedo; 57 Walbert Ureña; 56 Ryan Watson; 68 Blake Weiman	Catchers: 31 Tyler Heineman; 33 Logan Porter; Infielders: -- Nacho Alvarez Jr.; 5 Vaughn Grissom; 23 Denzer Guzmán; -- Jace Jung; 4 Christian Moore; 9 Zach Neto; 2 Oswald Peraza; 18 Nolan Schanuel; Outfielders: 51 Gustavo Campero; 3 Josh Lowe; 53 Wade Meckler; -- Nelson Rada; -- Raudi Rodriguez; 28 Jose Siri; 22 Bryce Teodosio; 27 Mike Trout; Designated hitters: 13 Moisés Ballesteros	Pitchers: -- Sammy Peralta	Manager: TBA TBA; Coaches: 99 Brady Anderson (hitting); 91 Mike Ashman (batting practice pitcher); 93 Jason Brown (bullpen catcher); 95 Tim Buss (staff assistant); 92 Adam Eaton (first base and outfield); 82 Derek Florko (assistant hitting); 85 John Gibbons (bench); 89 Keith Johnson (third base); -- Tim Leveque (interim pitching); 87 John Mabry (assistant hitting); 86 Andy Schatzley (infield); 83 Max Stassi (catching); -- Michael Wuertz (interim bullpen); 40 active, 0 inactive, 1 non-roster invitees; 7-, 10-, or 15-day injured list; * Not on active roster; ^{†} Suspended list; Roster, coaches, and NRIs updated November 20, 2026; Transactions • Depth chart; → All MLB rosters

== Farm system ==
Level	Team	League	Manager
AAA	Salt Lake Bees	Pacific Coast League	
AA	Rocket City Trash Pandas	Southern League	
A+	Tri-City Dust Devils	Northwest League	
A	Rancho Cucamonga Quakes	California League	
Rookie	ACL Angels	Arizona Complex League	
Foreign Rookie	DSL Angels	Dominican Summer League	

All coaches and rosters can be found on each team's website.

== See also ==
- Los Angeles Angels
- Angel Stadium

Records
Preceded by 2026	Los Angeles Angels seasons 2027	Succeeded by Current
