= 2027 Boston Red Sox season =

2027 Boston Red Sox
- League: American League
- Division: East
- Ballpark: Fenway Park
- City: Boston, Massachusetts
- Owners: John W. Henry (Fenway Sports Group)
- President: Sam Kennedy
- President of baseball operations: Craig Breslow
- Manager: Chad Tracy
- Television: NESN: TBD
- Radio: WEEI-FM / Boston Red Sox Radio Network: TBD

The 2027 Boston Red Sox season is scheduled to be the 127th season in Boston Red Sox franchise history, and their 116th season at Fenway Park. Chad Tracy is under contract to return as the team's on-field manager and Craig Breslow is under contract to return as the team's de facto general manager. Breslow's title was changed during the offseason from chief baseball officer to president of baseball operations.

The season is contingent on Major League Baseball (MLB) and the Major League Baseball Players Association (MLBPA) signing a new collective bargaining agreement (CBA). Without a new CBA, MLB is expected to lock out the players on December 2, 2026, until one is signed. If such a lockout extends indefinitely, the season could be postponed, shortened, or even cancelled.

== Game log ==
The 2027 schedule is tentative until a new collective bargaining agreement (CBA) is signed between Major League Baseball (MLB) and the Major League Baseball Players Association (MLBPA). If the labor dispute extends into late February or early March, MLB would then start to consider whether to postpone or shorten the season.

Color key
Home game	Away game

2027 Boston Red Sox Season Game Log: 0–0 (Home: 0–0; Away: 0–0)
March / April: 0–0 (Home: 0–0; Away: 0–0)

#	Date	Opponent	Score	Win	Loss	Save	Stadium	Attendance	Record	Box/ Streak
1	March 25	@ Mariners	—	—	—	—	T-Mobile Park	—	0–0	—
2	March 26	@ Mariners	—	—	—	—	T-Mobile Park	—	0–0	—
3	March 27	@ Mariners	—	—	—	—	T-Mobile Park	—	0–0	—
4	March 28	@ Mariners	—	—	—	—	T-Mobile Park	—	0–0	—
5	March 29	@ Astros	—	—	—	—	Daikin Park	—	0–0	—
6	March 30	@ Astros	—	—	—	—	Daikin Park	—	0–0	—
7	March 31	@ Astros	—	—	—	—	Daikin Park	—	0–0	—
8	April 1	Reds	—	—	—	—	Fenway Park	—	0–0	—
9	April 3	Reds	—	—	—	—	Fenway Park	—	0–0	—
10	April 4	Reds	—	—	—	—	Fenway Park	—	0–0	—
11	April 5	Astros	—	—	—	—	Fenway Park	—	0–0	—
12	April 6	Astros	—	—	—	—	Fenway Park	—	0–0	—
13	April 7	Astros	—	—	—	—	Fenway Park	—	0–0	—
14	April 9	@ Nationals	—	—	—	—	Nationals Park	—	0–0	—
15	April 10	@ Nationals	—	—	—	—	Nationals Park	—	0–0	—
16	April 11	@ Nationals	—	—	—	—	Nationals Park	—	0–0	—
17	April 12	@ Rays	—	—	—	—	Tropicana Field	—	0–0	—
18	April 13	@ Rays	—	—	—	—	Tropicana Field	—	0–0	—
19	April 14	@ Rays	—	—	—	—	Tropicana Field	—	0–0	—
20	April 15	@ Rays	—	—	—	—	Tropicana Field	—	0–0	—
21	April 16	Guardians	—	—	—	—	Fenway Park	—	0–0	—
22	April 17	Guardians	—	—	—	—	Fenway Park	—	0–0	—
23	April 18	Guardians	—	—	—	—	Fenway Park	—	0–0	—
24	April 19	Guardians	—	—	—	—	Fenway Park	—	0–0	—
25	April 20	Rays	—	—	—	—	Fenway Park	—	0–0	—
26	April 21	Rays	—	—	—	—	Fenway Park	—	0–0	—
27	April 22	Rays	—	—	—	—	Fenway Park	—	0–0	—
28	April 23	@ Tigers	—	—	—	—	Fifth Third Park	—	0–0	—
29	April 24	@ Tigers	—	—	—	—	Fifth Third Park	—	0–0	—
30	April 25	@ Tigers	—	—	—	—	Fifth Third Park	—	0–0	—
31	April 27	@ Orioles	—	—	—	—	Camden Yards	—	0–0	—
32	April 28	@ Orioles	—	—	—	—	Camden Yards	—	0–0	—
33	April 30	Cardinals	—	—	—	—	Fenway Park	—	0–0	—

May: 0–0 (Home: 0–0; Away: 0–0)

#	Date	Opponent	Score	Win	Loss	Save	Stadium	Attendance	Record	Box/ Streak
34	May 1	Cardinals	—	—	—	—	Fenway Park	—	0–0	—
35	May 2	Cardinals	—	—	—	—	Fenway Park	—	0–0	—
36	May 3	Blue Jays	—	—	—	—	Fenway Park	—	0–0	—
37	May 4	Blue Jays	—	—	—	—	Fenway Park	—	0–0	—
38	May 5	Blue Jays	—	—	—	—	Fenway Park	—	0–0	—
39	May 7	@ Guardians	—	—	—	—	Progressive Field	—	0–0	—
40	May 8	@ Guardians	—	—	—	—	Progressive Field	—	0–0	—
41	May 9	@ Guardians	—	—	—	—	Progressive Field	—	0–0	—
42	May 10	@ Blue Jays	—	—	—	—	Rogers Centre	—	0–0	—
43	May 11	@ Blue Jays	—	—	—	—	Rogers Centre	—	0–0	—
44	May 12	@ Blue Jays	—	—	—	—	Rogers Centre	—	0–0	—
45	May 13	@ Blue Jays	—	—	—	—	Rogers Centre	—	0–0	—
46	May 14	Dodgers	—	—	—	—	Fenway Park	—	0–0	—
47	May 15	Dodgers	—	—	—	—	Fenway Park	—	0–0	—
48	May 16	Dodgers	—	—	—	—	Fenway Park	—	0–0	—
49	May 18	@ Braves	—	—	—	—	Truist Park	—	0–0	—
50	May 19	@ Braves	—	—	—	—	Truist Park	—	0–0	—
51	May 20	@ Braves	—	—	—	—	Truist Park	—	0–0	—
52	May 21	Rangers	—	—	—	—	Fenway Park	—	0–0	—
53	May 22	Rangers	—	—	—	—	Fenway Park	—	0–0	—
54	May 23	Rangers	—	—	—	—	Fenway Park	—	0–0	—
55	May 24	White Sox	—	—	—	—	Fenway Park	—	0–0	—
56	May 25	White Sox	—	—	—	—	Fenway Park	—	0–0	—
57	May 26	White Sox	—	—	—	—	Fenway Park	—	0–0	—
58	May 28	@ Padres	—	—	—	—	Petco Park	—	0–0	—
59	May 29	@ Padres	—	—	—	—	Petco Park	—	0–0	—
60	May 30	@ Padres	—	—	—	—	Petco Park	—	0–0	—
61	May 31	@ Angels	—	—	—	—	Angel Stadium	—	0–0	—

June: 0–0 (Home: 0–0; Away: 0–0)

#	Date	Opponent	Score	Win	Loss	Save	Stadium	Attendance	Record	Box/ Streak
62	June 1	@ Angels	—	—	—	—	Angel Stadium	—	0–0	—
63	June 2	@ Angels	—	—	—	—	Angel Stadium	—	0–0	—
64	June 4	Yankees	—	—	—	—	Fenway Park	—	0–0	—
65	June 5	Yankees	—	—	—	—	Fenway Park	—	0–0	—
66	June 6	Yankees	—	—	—	—	Fenway Park	—	0–0	—
67	June 7	Yankees	—	—	—	—	Fenway Park	—	0–0	—
68	June 8	Marlins	—	—	—	—	Fenway Park	—	0–0	—
69	June 9	Marlins	—	—	—	—	Fenway Park	—	0–0	—
70	June 10	Marlins	—	—	—	—	Fenway Park	—	0–0	—
71	June 11	@ Yankees	—	—	—	—	Yankee Stadium	—	0–0	—
72	June 12	@ Yankees	—	—	—	—	Yankee Stadium	—	0–0	—
73	June 13	@ Yankees	—	—	—	—	Yankee Stadium	—	0–0	—
74	June 15	Athletics	—	—	—	—	Fenway Park	—	0–0	—
75	June 16	Athletics	—	—	—	—	Fenway Park	—	0–0	—
76	June 17	Athletics	—	—	—	—	Fenway Park	—	0–0	—
77	June 18	@ Diamondbacks	—	—	—	—	Chase Field	—	0–0	—
78	June 19	@ Diamondbacks	—	—	—	—	Chase Field	—	0–0	—
79	June 20	@ Diamondbacks	—	—	—	—	Chase Field	—	0–0	—
80	June 21	@ Athletics	—	—	—	—	Sutter Health Park	—	0–0	—
81	June 22	@ Athletics	—	—	—	—	Sutter Health Park	—	0–0	—
82	June 23	@ Athletics	—	—	—	—	Sutter Health Park	—	0–0	—
83	June 25	Rockies	—	—	—	—	Fenway Park	—	0–0	—
84	June 26	Rockies	—	—	—	—	Fenway Park	—	0–0	—
85	June 27	Rockies	—	—	—	—	Fenway Park	—	0–0	—
86	June 29	Twins	—	—	—	—	Fenway Park	—	0–0	—
87	June 30	Twins	—	—	—	—	Fenway Park	—	0–0	—

July: 0–0 (Home: 0–0; Away: 0–0)

#	Date	Opponent	Score	Win	Loss	Save	Stadium	Attendance	Record	Box/ Streak
88	July 1	Twins	—	—	—	—	Fenway Park	—	0–0	—
89	July 2	Orioles	—	—	—	—	Fenway Park	—	0–0	—
90	July 3	Orioles	—	—	—	—	Fenway Park	—	0–0	—
91	July 4	Orioles	—	—	—	—	Fenway Park	—	0–0	—
92	July 6	@ Rays	—	—	—	—	Tropicana Field	—	0–0	—
93	July 7	@ Rays	—	—	—	—	Tropicana Field	—	0–0	—
94	July 8	@ Rays	—	—	—	—	Tropicana Field	—	0–0	—
95	July 9	@ Twins	—	—	—	—	Target Field	—	0–0	—
96	July 10	@ Twins	—	—	—	—	Target Field	—	0–0	—
97	July 11	@ Twins	—	—	—	—	Target Field	—	0–0	—
ASG	July 13	All-Star Game	—	—	—	—	Wrigley Field	—	―	―
98	July 16	Braves	—	—	—	—	Fenway Park	—	0–0	—
99	July 17	Braves	—	—	—	—	Fenway Park	—	0–0	—
100	July 18	Braves	—	—	—	—	Fenway Park	—	0–0	—
101	July 19	Mets	—	—	—	—	Fenway Park	—	0–0	—
102	July 20	Mets	—	—	—	—	Fenway Park	—	0–0	—
103	July 21	Mets	—	—	—	—	Fenway Park	—	0–0	—
104	July 22	@ Orioles	—	—	—	—	Camden Yards	—	0–0	—
105	July 23	@ Orioles	—	—	—	—	Camden Yards	—	0–0	—
106	July 24	@ Orioles	—	—	—	—	Camden Yards	—	0–0	—
107	July 25	@ Orioles	—	—	—	—	Camden Yards	—	0–0	—
108	July 27	@ Phillies	—	—	—	—	Citizens Bank Park	—	0–0	—
109	July 28	@ Phillies	—	—	—	—	Citizens Bank Park	—	0–0	—
110	July 29	@ Phillies	—	—	—	—	Citizens Bank Park	—	0–0	—
111	July 30	@ Cubs	—	—	—	—	Wrigley Field	—	0–0	—
112	July 31	@ Cubs	—	—	—	—	Wrigley Field	—	0–0	—

August: 0–0 (Home: 0–0; Away: 0–0)

#	Date	Opponent	Score	Win	Loss	Save	Stadium	Attendance	Record	Box/ Streak
113	August 1	@ Cubs	—	—	—	—	Wrigley Field	—	0–0	—
114	August 2	Angels	—	—	—	—	Fenway Park	—	0–0	—
115	August 3	Angels	—	—	—	—	Fenway Park	—	0–0	—
116	August 4	Angels	—	—	—	—	Fenway Park	—	0–0	—
117	August 6	Yankees	—	—	—	—	Fenway Park	—	0–0	—
118	August 7	Yankees	—	—	—	—	Fenway Park	—	0–0	—
119	August 8	Yankees	—	—	—	—	Fenway Park	—	0–0	—
120	August 9	@ White Sox	—	—	—	—	Rate Field	—	0–0	—
121	August 10	@ White Sox	—	—	—	—	Rate Field	—	0–0	—
122	August 11	@ White Sox	—	—	—	—	Rate Field	—	0–0	—
123	August 12	@ Royals*	—	—	—	—	Field of Dreams	—	0–0	—
124	August 14	@ Royals	—	—	—	—	Kauffman Stadium	—	0–0	—
125	August 15	@ Royals	—	—	—	—	Kauffman Stadium	—	0–0	—
126	August 16	Blue Jays	—	—	—	—	Fenway Park	—	0–0	—
127	August 17	Blue Jays	—	—	—	—	Fenway Park	—	0–0	—
128	August 18	Blue Jays	—	—	—	—	Fenway Park	—	0–0	—
129	August 20	Pirates	—	—	—	—	Fenway Park	—	0–0	—
130	August 21	Pirates	—	—	—	—	Fenway Park	—	0–0	—
131	August 22	Pirates	—	—	—	—	Fenway Park	—	0–0	—
132	August 24	@ Giants	—	—	—	—	Oracle Park	—	0–0	—
133	August 25	@ Giants	—	—	—	—	Oracle Park	—	0–0	—
134	August 26	@ Giants	—	—	—	—	Oracle Park	—	0–0	—
135	August 27	@ Rangers	—	—	—	—	Globe Life Field	—	0–0	—
136	August 28	@ Rangers	—	—	—	—	Globe Life Field	—	0–0	—
137	August 29	@ Rangers	—	—	—	—	Globe Life Field	—	0–0	—
138	August 30	Orioles	—	—	—	—	Fenway Park	—	0–0	—
139	August 31	Orioles	—	—	—	—	Fenway Park	—	0–0	—
*August 12 game played at Field of Dreams in Dyersville, Iowa

September: 0–0 (Home: 0–0; Away: 0–0)

#	Date	Opponent	Score	Win	Loss	Save	Stadium	Attendance	Record	Box/ Streak
140	September 1	Orioles	—	—	—	—	Fenway Park	—	0–0	—
141	September 2	Orioles	—	—	—	—	Fenway Park	—	0–0	—
142	September 3	Mariners	—	—	—	—	Fenway Park	—	0–0	—
143	September 4	Mariners	—	—	—	—	Fenway Park	—	0–0	—
144	September 5	Mariners	—	—	—	—	Fenway Park	—	0–0	—
145	September 6	@ Blue Jays	—	—	—	—	Rogers Centre	—	0–0	—
146	September 7	@ Blue Jays	—	—	—	—	Rogers Centre	—	0–0	—
147	September 8	@ Blue Jays	—	—	—	—	Rogers Centre	—	0–0	—
148	September 10	Tigers	—	—	—	—	Fenway Park	—	0–0	—
149	September 11	Tigers	—	—	—	—	Fenway Park	—	0–0	—
150	September 12	Tigers	—	—	—	—	Fenway Park	—	0–0	—
151	September 14	@ Brewers	—	—	—	—	American Family Field	—	0–0	—
152	September 15	@ Brewers	—	—	—	—	American Family Field	—	0–0	—
153	September 16	@ Brewers	—	—	—	—	American Family Field	—	0–0	—
154	September 17	@ Yankees	—	—	—	—	Yankee Stadium	—	0–0	—
155	September 18	@ Yankees	—	—	—	—	Yankee Stadium	—	0–0	—
156	September 19	@ Yankees	—	—	—	—	Yankee Stadium	—	0–0	—
157	September 21	Rays	—	—	—	—	Fenway Park	—	0–0	—
158	September 22	Rays	—	—	—	—	Fenway Park	—	0–0	—
159	September 23	Rays	—	—	—	—	Fenway Park	—	0–0	—
160	September 24	Royals	—	—	—	—	Fenway Park	—	0–0	—
161	September 25	Royals	—	—	—	—	Fenway Park	—	0–0	—
162	September 26	Royals	—	—	—	—	Fenway Park	—	0–0	—

== Current roster ==
Boston Red Sox 2027 spring training roster
40-man roster		Non-roster invitees	Coaches / other
Pitchers: 66 Brayan Bello; 64 Jake Bennett; 44 Aroldis Chapman; 50 Kutter Crawford; 35 Garrett Crochet; 68 Alec Gamboa; 41 Tyron Guerrero; 89 Tanner Houck; 67 Erik Miller; 47 Jovani Morán; 75 Wyatt Olds; 65 Jedixson Páez; 78 Tyler Samaniego; 63 Justin Slaten; 55 Ranger Suárez; 70 Payton Tolle; 57 Greg Weissert; 22 Garrett Whitlock	Catchers: -- Nick Fortes; 31 Adley Rutschman; Infielders: 18 Jake Bauers; 36 Triston Casas; 40 Willson Contreras; 5 Caleb Durbin; 11 Curtis Mead; 32 Andruw Monasterio; 48 Anthony Seigler; 20 Nick Sogard; 10 Trevor Story; Outfielders: 52 Wilyer Abreu; 19 Roman Anthony; 28 Kristian Campbell; 16 Jarren Duran; 3 Ceddanne Rafaela; 38 Eli White; Designated hitters: 30 Mickey Gasper; 23 Romy González; 37 Jahmai Jones; 7 Masataka Yoshida	Pitchers: -- Miguel Arias; Catchers: -- Riley Adams; Outfielders: -- Duke Ellis	Manager: 17 Chad Tracy; Coaches: 53 Andrew Bailey (pitching); 83 Pablo Cabrera (first base/outfield, interim); 81 Chad Epperson (third base, interim); 58 José David Flores (bench, interim); 86 Parker Guinn (bullpen catcher/catching instructor); 84 Collin Hetzler (interim hitting); 59 Chris Holt (bullpen); 88 Nelson Paulino (hitting, interim); 82 Devin Rose (pitching strategist); 92 Jack Simonetty (interim hitting assistant); 85 John Soteropulos (hitting); 39 active, 0 inactive, 3 non-roster invitees; 7-, 10-, or 15-day injured list; * Not on active roster; ^{†} Suspended list; Roster, coaches, and NRIs updated November 20, 2026; Transactions • Depth chart; → All MLB rosters

== Farm system ==
Note: listed divisions are per the 2026 season and are subject to change.

Level	Team	League	Division	Manager	Notes
Triple-A	Worcester Red Sox	International League	East		
Double-A	Portland Sea Dogs	Eastern League	Northeast		
High-A	Greenville Drive	South Atlantic League	South		
Single-A	Salem RidgeYaks	Carolina League	North		
Rookie	FCL Red Sox	Florida Complex League	South		
Rookie	DSL Red Sox Blue	Dominican; Summer League	North		
Rookie	DSL Red Sox Red	Dominican; Summer League	Northwest		
