= 2027 Milwaukee Brewers season =

2027 Milwaukee Brewers
- League: National League
- Division: Central
- Ballpark: American Family Field
- City: Milwaukee, Wisconsin, United States
- Owners: Mark Attanasio
- General managers: Matt Arnold
- Managers: Pat Murphy
- Television: FanDuel Sports Network Wisconsin (Brian Anderson, Bill Schroeder, Jeff Levering, Tim Dillard, Chris Singleton, Vinny Rottino, Jeff Cirillo, Sophia Minnaert, Dario Melendez, Stephen Watson); Telemundo Wisconsin (Spanish-language coverage, Sunday home games; Hector Molina, Kevin Holden)
- Radio: 620 WTMJ; Milwaukee Brewers Radio Network (Jeff Levering, Lane Grindle, Josh Maurer, Jerry Augustine)
- Stats: ESPN.com; Baseball Reference

The 2027 Milwaukee Brewers season is scheduled to be the 58th season for the Brewers in Milwaukee, their 30th in the National League, and their 59th overall. They would enter the season as the defending World Series champions.

The season is contingent on Major League Baseball (MLB) and the Major League Baseball Players Association (MLBPA) signing a new collective bargaining agreement (CBA). Without a new CBA, MLB is expected to lock out the players on December 2, 2026, until one is signed. If such a lockout extends indefinitely, the season could be postponed, shortened, or even cancelled.

== Game log ==
The 2027 schedule is tentative until a new collective bargaining agreement (CBA) is signed between Major League Baseball (MLB) and the Major League Baseball Players Association (MLBPA). If the labor dispute extends into late February or early March, MLB would then start to consider whether to postpone or shorten the season.

=== Regular season ===
Legend
	Brewers win
	Brewers loss
	Postponement
**Bold**	Brewers team member

2027 regular season game log: 0–0 (Home: 0–0; Away: 0–0)
March/April: 0–0 (Home: 0–0; Road: 0–0)

#	Date	Opponent	Score	Win	Loss	Save	Attendance	Record	Box/ Streak
1	March 25	Angels	—	—	—	—	—	0–0	—
2	March 27	Angels	—	—	—	—	—	0–0	—
3	March 28	Angels	—	—	—	—	—	0–0	—
4	March 29	Braves	—	—	—	—	—	0–0	—
5	March 30	Braves	—	—	—	—	—	0–0	—
6	March 31	Braves	—	—	—	—	—	0–0	—
7	April 1	@ White Sox	—	—	—	—	—	0–0	—
8	April 3	@ White Sox	—	—	—	—	—	0–0	—
9	April 4	@ White Sox	—	—	—	—	—	0–0	—
10	April 5	@ Blue Jays	—	—	—	—	—	0–0	—
11	April 6	@ Blue Jays	—	—	—	—	—	0–0	—
12	April 7	@ Blue Jays	—	—	—	—	—	0–0	—
13	April 9	Phillies	—	—	—	—	—	0–0	—
14	April 10	Phillies	—	—	—	—	—	0–0	—
15	April 11	Phillies	—	—	—	—	—	0–0	—
16	April 12	Pirates	—	—	—	—	—	0–0	—
17	April 13	Pirates	—	—	—	—	—	0–0	—
18	April 14	Pirates	—	—	—	—	—	0–0	—
19	April 15	Pirates	—	—	—	—	—	0–0	—
20	April 16	@ Phillies	—	—	—	—	—	0–0	—
21	April 17	@ Phillies	—	—	—	—	—	0–0	—
22	April 18	@ Phillies	—	—	—	—	—	0–0	—
23	April 19	@ Yankees	—	—	—	—	—	0–0	—
24	April 20	@ Yankees	—	—	—	—	—	0–0	—
25	April 21	@ Yankees	—	—	—	—	—	0–0	—
26	April 23	Rockies	—	—	—	—	—	0–0	—
27	April 24	Rockies	—	—	—	—	—	0–0	—
28	April 25	Rockies	—	—	—	—	—	0–0	—
29	April 26	@ Cubs	—	—	—	—	—	0–0	—
30	April 27	@ Cubs	—	—	—	—	—	0–0	—
31	April 28	@ Cubs	—	—	—	—	—	0–0	—
32	April 30	Reds	—	—	—	—	—	0–0	—

May: 0–0 (Home: 0–0; Road: 0–0)

#	Date	Opponent	Score	Win	Loss	Save	Attendance	Record	Box/ Streak
33	May 1	Reds	—	—	—	—	—	0–0	—
34	May 2	Reds	—	—	—	—	—	0–0	—
35	May 3	Giants	—	—	—	—	—	0–0	—
36	May 4	Giants	—	—	—	—	—	0–0	—
37	May 5	Giants	—	—	—	—	—	0–0	—
38	May 6	@ Cardinals	—	—	—	—	—	0–0	—
39	May 7	@ Cardinals	—	—	—	—	—	0–0	—
40	May 8	@ Cardinals	—	—	—	—	—	0–0	—
41	May 9	@ Cardinals	—	—	—	—	—	0–0	—
42	May 11	@ Pirates	—	—	—	—	—	0–0	—
43	May 12	@ Pirates	—	—	—	—	—	0–0	—
44	May 13	@ Pirates	—	—	—	—	—	0–0	—
45	May 14	Mets	—	—	—	—	—	0–0	—
46	May 15	Mets	—	—	—	—	—	0–0	—
47	May 16	Mets	—	—	—	—	—	0–0	—
48	May 17	Cubs	—	—	—	—	—	0–0	—
49	May 18	Cubs	—	—	—	—	—	0–0	—
50	May 19	Cubs	—	—	—	—	—	0–0	—
51	May 20	Cubs	—	—	—	—	—	0–0	—
52	May 21	@ Marlins	—	—	—	—	—	0–0	—
53	May 22	@ Marlins	—	—	—	—	—	0–0	—
54	May 23	@ Marlins	—	—	—	—	—	0–0	—
55	May 25	@ Reds	—	—	—	—	—	0–0	—
56	May 26	@ Reds	—	—	—	—	—	0–0	—
57	May 27	@ Reds	—	—	—	—	—	0–0	—
58	May 28	Diamondbacks	—	—	—	—	—	0–0	—
59	May 29	Diamondbacks	—	—	—	—	—	0–0	—
60	May 30	Diamondbacks	—	—	—	—	—	0–0	—
61	May 31	Dodgers	—	—	—	—	—	0–0	—

June: 0–0 (Home: 0–0; Road: 0–0)

#	Date	Opponent	Score	Win	Loss	Save	Attendance	Record	Box/ Streak
62	June 1	Dodgers	—	—	—	—	—	0–0	—
63	June 2	Dodgers	—	—	—	—	—	0–0	—
64	June 4	@ Padres	—	—	—	—	—	0–0	—
65	June 5	@ Padres	—	—	—	—	—	0–0	—
66	June 6	@ Padres	—	—	—	—	—	0–0	—
67	June 7	@ Dodgers	—	—	—	—	—	0–0	—
68	June 8	@ Dodgers	—	—	—	—	—	0–0	—
69	June 9	@ Dodgers	—	—	—	—	—	0–0	—
70	June 11	Cardinals	—	—	—	—	—	0–0	—
71	June 12	Cardinals	—	—	—	—	—	0–0	—
72	June 13	Cardinals	—	—	—	—	—	0–0	—
73	June 14	Royals	—	—	—	—	—	0–0	—
74	June 15	Royals	—	—	—	—	—	0–0	—
75	June 16	Royals	—	—	—	—	—	0–0	—
76	June 18	@ Rays	—	—	—	—	—	0–0	—
77	June 19	@ Rays	—	—	—	—	—	0–0	—
78	June 20	@ Rays	—	—	—	—	—	0–0	—
79	June 21	@ Mets	—	—	—	—	—	0–0	—
80	June 22	@ Mets	—	—	—	—	—	0–0	—
81	June 23	@ Mets	—	—	—	—	—	0–0	—
82	June 25	Nationals	—	—	—	—	—	0–0	—
83	June 26	Nationals	—	—	—	—	—	0–0	—
84	June 27	Nationals	—	—	—	—	—	0–0	—
85	June 28	Pirates	—	—	—	—	—	0–0	—
86	June 29	Pirates	—	—	—	—	—	0–0	—
87	June 30	Pirates	—	—	—	—	—	0–0	—

July: 0–0 (Home: 0–0; Road: 0–0)

#	Date	Opponent	Score	Win	Loss	Save	Attendance	Record	Box/ Streak
88	July 2	@ Reds	—	—	—	—	—	0–0	—
89	July 3	@ Reds	—	—	—	—	—	0–0	—
90	July 4	@ Reds	—	—	—	—	—	0–0	—
91	July 5	@ Reds	—	—	—	—	—	0–0	—
92	July 6	@ Nationals	—	—	—	—	—	0–0	—
93	July 7	@ Nationals	—	—	—	—	—	0–0	—
94	July 8	@ Nationals	—	—	—	—	—	0–0	—
95	July 9	@ Guardians	—	—	—	—	—	0–0	—
96	July 10	@ Guardians	—	—	—	—	—	0–0	—
97	July 11	@ Guardians	—	—	—	—	—	0–0	—
ASG	July 13	AL @ NL	—	—	—	—	—	—	—
98	July 16	Twins	—	—	—	—	—	0–0	—
99	July 17	Twins	—	—	—	—	—	0–0	—
100	July 18	Twins	—	—	—	—	—	0–0	—
101	July 19	Tigers	—	—	—	—	—	0–0	—
102	July 20	Tigers	—	—	—	—	—	0–0	—
103	July 21	Tigers	—	—	—	—	—	0–0	—
104	July 22	Marlins	—	—	—	—	—	0–0	—
105	July 23	Marlins	—	—	—	—	—	0–0	—
106	July 24	Marlins	—	—	—	—	—	0–0	—
107	July 25	Marlins	—	—	—	—	—	0–0	—
108	July 27	@ Mariners	—	—	—	—	—	0–0	—
109	July 28	@ Mariners	—	—	—	—	—	0–0	—
110	July 29	@ Mariners	—	—	—	—	—	0–0	—
111	July 30	@ Rockies	—	—	—	—	—	0–0	—
112	July 31	@ Rockies	—	—	—	—	—	0–0	—

August: 0–0 (Home: 0–0; Road: 0–0)

#	Date	Opponent	Score	Win	Loss	Save	Attendance	Record	Box/ Streak
113	August 1	@ Rockies	—	—	—	—	—	0–0	—
114	August 2	Padres	—	—	—	—	—	0–0	—
115	August 3	Padres	—	—	—	—	—	0–0	—
116	August 4	Padres	—	—	—	—	—	0–0	—
117	August 6	Reds	—	—	—	—	—	0–0	—
118	August 7	Reds	—	—	—	—	—	0–0	—
119	August 8	Reds	—	—	—	—	—	0–0	—
120	August 9	@ Giants	—	—	—	—	—	0–0	—
121	August 10	@ Giants	—	—	—	—	—	0–0	—
122	August 11	@ Giants	—	—	—	—	—	0–0	—
123	August 12	@ Diamondbacks	—	—	—	—	—	0–0	—
124	August 13	@ Diamondbacks	—	—	—	—	—	0–0	—
125	August 14	@ Diamondbacks	—	—	—	—	—	0–0	—
126	August 15	@ Diamondbacks	—	—	—	—	—	0–0	—
127	August 16	Athletics	—	—	—	—	—	0–0	—
128	August 17	Athletics	—	—	—	—	—	0–0	—
129	August 18	Athletics	—	—	—	—	—	0–0	—
130	August 20	Astros	—	—	—	—	—	0–0	—
131	August 21	Astros	—	—	—	—	—	0–0	—
132	August 22	Astros	—	—	—	—	—	0–0	—
133	August 23	@ Braves	—	—	—	—	—	0–0	—
134	August 24	@ Braves	—	—	—	—	—	0–0	—
135	August 25	@ Braves	—	—	—	—	—	0–0	—
136	August 27	Cardinals	—	—	—	—	—	0–0	—
137	August 28	Cardinals	—	—	—	—	—	0–0	—
138	August 29	Cardinals	—	—	—	—	—	0–0	—
139	August 30	@ Cubs	—	—	—	—	—	0–0	—
140	August 31	@ Cubs	—	—	—	—	—	0–0	—

September: 0–0 (Home: 0–0; Road: 0–0)

#	Date	Opponent	Score	Win	Loss	Save	Attendance	Record	Box/ Streak
141	September 1	@ Cubs	—	—	—	—	—	0–0	—
142	September 3	@ Pirates	—	—	—	—	—	0–0	—
143	September 4	@ Pirates	—	—	—	—	—	0–0	—
144	September 5	@ Pirates	—	—	—	—	—	0–0	—
145	September 6	Cubs	—	—	—	—	—	0–0	—
146	September 7	Cubs	—	—	—	—	—	0–0	—
147	September 8	Cubs	—	—	—	—	—	0–0	—
148	September 10	@ Twins	—	—	—	—	—	0–0	—
149	September 11	@ Twins	—	—	—	—	—	0–0	—
150	September 12	@ Twins	—	—	—	—	—	0–0	—
151	September 14	Red Sox	—	—	—	—	—	0–0	—
152	September 15	Red Sox	—	—	—	—	—	0–0	—
153	September 16	Red Sox	—	—	—	—	—	0–0	—
154	September 17	Orioles	—	—	—	—	—	0–0	—
155	September 18	Orioles	—	—	—	—	—	0–0	—
156	September 19	Orioles	—	—	—	—	—	0–0	—
157	September 20	@ Cardinals	—	—	—	—	—	0–0	—
158	September 21	@ Cardinals	—	—	—	—	—	0–0	—
159	September 22	@ Cardinals	—	—	—	—	—	0–0	—
160	September 24	@ Rangers	—	—	—	—	—	0–0	—
161	September 25	@ Rangers	—	—	—	—	—	0–0	—
162	September 26	@ Rangers	—	—	—	—	—	0–0	—

== Current roster ==
Milwaukee Brewers 2027 spring training roster
40-man roster		Non-roster invitees	Coaches / other
Pitchers: 56 Grant Anderson; 26 Aaron Ashby; 57 Coleman Crow; 55 Shane Drohan; 54 Robert Gasser; 36 Colton Gordon; 37 DL Hall; 52 Kyle Harrison; 43 Logan Henderson; -- Tate Kuehner; 29 Trevor Megill; 32 Jacob Misiorowski; 39 Chad Patrick; 23 Brandon Sproat; 31 Garrett Stallings; 45 Abner Uribe; -- Cameron Wagoner; -- Ryan Walker	Catchers: 24 William Contreras; 14 Bo Naylor; 15 Jeferson Quero; -- Matt Wood; Infielders: -- Luke Adams; 6 David Hamilton; 3 Joey Ortiz; 12 Cooper Pratt; 2 Brice Turang; 28 Andrew Vaughn; -- Jett Williams; Outfielders: 11 Jackson Chourio; 10 Sal Frelick; 18 Luis Lara; 20 Brandon Lockridge; 5 Garrett Mitchell; -- Dylan O'Rae; Designated hitters: 7 Tyler Black; 22 Christian Yelich	Infielders: -- Braden Shewmake	Manager: 00 Pat Murphy; Coaches: 67 Spencer Allen (first base); 97 Christian Correa (bullpen catcher); 98 Néstor Corredor (field coordinator); 95 Daniel de Mondesert (game preparation specialist); 94 Ty Duvall (bullpen catcher); 68 Matt Erickson (third base); 88 Charlie Greene (bullpen); 71 Jim Henderson (pitching coordinator); 84 Chris Hook (pitching); 40 Jason Lane (offense and strategy coordinator); 96 Evan Martin (game preparation specialist); 91 Guillermo Martínez (hitting); 93 Juan Sandoval (assistant pitching); 85 Eric Theisen (lead hitting); 92 Daniel Vogelbach (hitting); 60-day injured list: 35 Brian Fitzpatrick; 46 Quinn Priester; 61 Ángel Zerpa; 37 active, 0 inactive, 1 non-roster invitees; 7-, 10-, or 15-day injured list; * Not on active roster; ^{†} Suspended list; Roster, coaches, and NRIs updated November 19, 2026; Transactions • Depth chart; → All MLB rosters

== Farm system ==
Level	Team	League	Manager
Triple-A	Nashville Sounds	International League	
Double-A	Biloxi Shuckers	Southern League	
High-A	Wisconsin Timber Rattlers	Midwest League	
Single-A	Carolina Mudcats	Carolina League	
Rookie	ACL Brewers	Arizona Complex League	
Rookie	DSL Brewers 1	Dominican Summer League	
Rookie	DSL Brewers 2	Dominican Summer League	
