= 2027 Major League Baseball All-Star Game =

Upcoming All-Star baseball game

- Teams: American League; National League
- Date: July 13, 2027
- Venue: Wrigley Field
- City: Chicago, Illinois
- Managers: Kevin Cash (TB); Pat Murphy (MIL)
- Television: Fox
- TV announcers: Joe Davis, John Smoltz, Ken Rosenthal, and Tom Verducci
- Radio: ESPN Radio
- Radio announcers: TBA, Doug Glanville, Buster Olney, and Tim Kurkjian

The 2027 Major League Baseball All-Star Game is the planned 97th Major League Baseball All-Star Game played between the American League (AL) and the National League (NL) of Major League Baseball. The game is scheduled to be played on July 13, 2027, and televised nationally by Fox. The game would be hosted by the Chicago Cubs at Wrigley Field in Chicago, Illinois. Like the rest of the 2027 MLB season, the game is contingent on MLB and the Major League Baseball Players Association (MLBPA) signing a new collective bargaining agreement (CBA) to replace that one that expires on December 1, 2026.

== Background ==
=== Host selection ===
On May 22, 2025, it was reported that the Chicago Cubs would host the All-Star Game in 2027. The venue was confirmed by MLB on August 1. This will be the fourth time that the Cubs and Wrigley Field have hosted an All-Star Game and the eighth All-Star Game in Chicago. The Cubs previously hosted in 1947, 1962 (second game), and 1990. The city last hosted the All-Star Game in 2003 at the Chicago White Sox stadium, U.S. Cellular Field.

The All-Star Game logo was unveiled on July 17, 2026, prior to the Cubs' home game against the Minnesota Twins, with the presence of several former Cubs All-Stars, as well as celebrity fans Bill Murray and Eddie Vedder. The logo features the red grandstand marquee at Wrigley Field, as well as a six-pointed star reflective of those present on the flag of Chicago in between the words "All" and "Star".

== See also ==
- List of Major League Baseball All-Star Games
- All-Star Futures Game
- Home Run Derby
