= Major League Baseball collusion =

Part of labor relations in Major League Baseball

Major League Baseball collusion refers to owners working together to avoid competitive bidding for player services or players jointly negotiating with team owners.

Collusion in baseball is formally defined in the Major League Baseball Collective Bargaining Agreement, which states "Players shall not act in concert with other Players and Clubs shall not act in concert with other Clubs." Major League Baseball went through a period of owner collusion during the off-seasons of 1985, 1986, and 1987.

Historically, owner collusion was often referred to as a "gentleman's agreement". After the 1918 season, owners released all their players – terminating the non-guaranteed contracts, with a "gentleman's agreement" not to sign each other's players, as a means of forcing down player salaries.

== 1966–1968 ==
Hall of Famer Sandy Koufax

Before the 1966 season, Sandy Koufax and Don Drysdale decided to jointly hold out during salary negotiations with the Los Angeles Dodgers. Koufax and Drysdale were the team's star pitchers who had helped the Dodgers win the 1965 World Series. The Dodgers needed them if they were to have any chance of returning to the World Series in 1966. After holding out for the first 32 days of spring training, the pair agreed on one-year contracts: Koufax for $125,000 and Drysdale for $110,000. At the time, these were the two largest contracts in baseball history. The owners were fearful that other star players would follow their example.

=== Collective Bargaining Agreement ===
In 1968, new union leader Marvin Miller negotiated baseball's first Collective Bargaining Agreement (CBA) with team owners. The owners wanted to prohibit players from holding joint negotiations. Miller was willing to agree, provided that the ban applied to the owners as well. The owners readily agreed, and every CBA since then has included the sentence: "Players shall not act in concert with other Players and Clubs shall not act in concert with other Clubs."

== 1985–1987 ==
Shortly after being elected commissioner in 1984, Peter Ueberroth addressed the owners at a meeting in St. Louis. Ueberroth called the owners "damned dumb" for being willing to lose millions of dollars in order to win a World Series. Later, at a separate meeting with the general managers in Tarpon Springs, Florida, Ueberroth said that it was "not smart" to sign long-term contracts. The message was obvious—hold down salaries by any means necessary. It later emerged that the owners agreed to keep contracts down to three years for position players and two for pitchers.

=== Collusion I ===
The free agent market following the 1985 season was different from any since the Seitz decision a decade earlier. Of 35 free agents, only four changed teams—and those four were not wanted by their old teams. Star players, such as Kirk Gibson, Tommy John and Phil Niekro, did not receive offers from other teams. The cover of the December 9, 1985 edition of Sporting News asked, "Why Won't Anyone Sign Kirk Gibson?" George Steinbrenner offered Carlton Fisk a contract, then withdrew the offer after getting a call from Chicago White Sox chairman Jerry Reinsdorf. Teams also reduced team rosters from 25 to 24 players.

By December, several agents thought something was amiss, and complained to Major League Baseball Players Association (MLBPA) president Donald Fehr. In February 1986, the MLBPA filed its first grievance, later known as "Collusion I."

=== Collusion II ===
The free agent market following the 1986 season was not much better for the players. Only four free agents switched teams. Andre Dawson took a pay cut and a one-year contract to sign with the Chicago Cubs. Three fourths of the free agents signed one-year contracts. Star players that ended up back with their old teams included Jack Morris (Detroit Tigers), Tim Raines (Montreal Expos), Ron Guidry (New York Yankees), Rich Gedman (Red Sox), Bob Boone (California Angels), and Doyle Alexander (Atlanta Braves).

For the first time since the start of free agency, the average major league salary declined. The average free-agent salary dropped by 16 percent, while MLB reported revenues increasing by 15 percent. This prompted the MLBPA to file a second grievance (Collusion II) on February 18, 1987. Even as this was happening, Ueberroth ordered the owners to tell him personally if they planned to offer contracts longer than three years.

In September 1987, the Collusion I case came before arbitrator Thomas T. Roberts, who ruled that the owners had violated the CBA by conspiring to restrict player movement.

=== Collusion III ===
After the ruling, the owners changed their tactic, but not their intent. They created an "information bank" to share information about what offers were being made to players. Players affected included Paul Molitor, Jack Clark, and Dennis Martínez. In January 1988 the MLBPA filed its third grievance (Collusion III).

On January 18, 1988, Roberts ordered the owners to pay $10.5 million in damages to the players. By then, only 14 of the 1985 free agents were still in baseball, and Roberts awarded seven of them a second chance as "new look" free agents. They could offer their services to any team without losing their existing contracts. On January 29, 1988, Kirk Gibson signed a $4.5 million, three-year contract with the Los Angeles Dodgers.

In October 1989, arbitrator George Nicolau presided over Collusion II, and found in favor of the players. Nicolau determined damages of $38 million. "New look" free agents included Ron Guidry, Bob Boone, Doyle Alexander, Willie Randolph, Brian Downing and Rich Gedman.

Collusion III damages were $64.5 million. Owners would also have to compensate the players for losses related to multi-year contracts and lost bonuses. "New look" free agents from this settlement were Jack Morris, Gary Gaetti, Larry Andersen, Brett Butler and Dave Henderson.

A final settlement of the three collusion cases was reached in November 1990. The owners agreed to pay the players $280 million, with the MLBPA deciding how to distribute the money to the damaged players.

At that time, then-commissioner Fay Vincent told the owners:

The single biggest reality you guys have to face up to is collusion. You stole $280 million from the players, and the players are unified to a man around that issue, because you got caught and many of you are still involved.

Miller largely agreed with Vincent's sentiments, saying Ueberroth and the owners' behavior was "tantamount to fixing, not just games, but entire pennant races, including all post-season series."

Later, Vincent would blame baseball's labor problems of the early 1990s, including the 1994–95 strike, on player anger at what he called the owners' theft from the players.

=== Collusion and expansion ===
In 2005, Vincent claimed that the owners used the Major's two rounds of expansion in the 1990s (which produced the Florida Marlins, Colorado Rockies, Arizona Diamondbacks and Tampa Bay Devil Rays) in part to pay the damages from the collusion settlement.

== 2000s ==
=== Collusion allegations: 2002–2003 ===
Players alleged that owners engaged in collusion in the 2002 and 2003 seasons. As part of the 2006 CBA, owners agreed to pay the players $12 million from "luxury tax" revenue sharing funds. The agreement was made with no admission of guilt.

=== Collusion concerns: 2007 ===
In November 2007, the MLB Players' Union raised concerns that owners collusively shared information about free agents and possibly conspired to keep the final price of Alex Rodriguez's new free agent contract down.

=== Collusion allegations: 2008 ===
In October 2008, the MLB Players' Association indicated that it would file a collusion grievance against the owners claiming that they conspired illegally to keep Barry Bonds from receiving a 2008 contract. The grievance was abandoned because there were no grounds to force a team to sign a player against their will, and no proof of any organized effort against Bonds.
