= 2025 Baltimore Orioles season =

Major League Baseball team season

2025 Baltimore Orioles
- League: American League
- Division: East
- Ballpark: Oriole Park at Camden Yards
- City: Baltimore, Maryland
- Record: 75–87 (.463)
- Divisional place: 5th
- Owners: David Rubenstein
- General managers: Mike Elias
- Managers: Brandon Hyde (until May 17); Tony Mansolino (Interim)
- Television: MASN (Kevin Brown, Scott Garceau, Ben Wagner, Brett Hollander, Melanie Newman, Jim Palmer, Brian Roberts, Brad Brach, Dave Johnson, Ben McDonald, Mike Devereaux, Rob Long)
- Radio: WBAL-AM; Baltimore Orioles Radio Network (Geoff Arnold, Brett Hollander, Scott Garceau, Ben Wagner, Kevin Brown, Ben Mcdonald, Melanie Newman)

The 2025 Baltimore Orioles season was the 125th season in Baltimore Orioles franchise history, the 72nd in Baltimore, and the 34th at Oriole Park at Camden Yards. The Orioles tried to improve from the previous season's 91–71 record, but failed to do so, as they lost their 72nd game against the Boston Red Sox on August 26. Twenty-nine players spent time on the injured list during the campaign.

On May 17, the Orioles, who were sitting in last place in the AL East with a 15–28 record, fired manager Brandon Hyde, just two years removed from winning AL Manager of the Year.

The Orioles were mathematically eliminated from postseason contention on September 16, failing to qualify for the first time since 2022. The highlight of the season came in a September 6 home win against the defending champion Dodgers, a game they won 4–3 despite being no-hit for by Yoshinobu Yamamoto for 8 2/3 innings.

During the 2025 season, the Orioles used 70 different players, tying the previous Major League Baseball record for most players used in a single season, originally set by the 2024 Miami Marlins. The record-tying appearance came when José Espada was used as a reliever on September 20. The Atlanta Braves later broke this record on September 28 and the 2026 San Francisco Giants would match their mark a season later.

== Offseason ==
The Orioles finished the 2024 season with a record of 91–71, making the playoffs as a Wild Card team. However, they would lose in the first round of the playoffs to the Kansas City Royals.

=== Transactions ===
==== October 2024 ====
October 7	LHP Tucker Davidson elected free agency.

October 31	RF Austin Slater, RF Anthony Santander, C James McCann, RHP Burch Smith, LHP John Means, RHP Brooks Kriske, RHP Corbin Burnes elected free agency.

==== November 2024 ====
November 2	DH Eloy Jiménez elected free agency.

November 4	LHP Danny Coulombe elected free agency.

November 22	RHP Jacob Webb elected free agency.

==== December 2024 ====
December 10	Orioles signed outfielder Tyler O'Neill to a three–year, $49.5 million contract. Orioles signed catcher Gary Sánchez to a one–year, $8.5 million contract.

December 16	Orioles signed right-handed pitcher Tomoyuki Sugano a one-year, $13 million contract.

==== January 2025 ====
January 3	Orioles signed right-handed pitcher Charlie Morton signed a one-year, $15 million contract.

January 13	Orioles signed right-handed pitcher Andrew Kittredge signed a one-year, $10 million contract.

January 27	Orioles signed outfielder Dylan Carlson to a one-year, $975,000 contract plus incentives.

== Regular season ==
=== Regular season standings ===
==== American League East ====
AL East
Team	W	L	Pct.	GB	Home	Road
Toronto Blue Jays	94	68	.580	—	54‍–‍27	40‍–‍41
New York Yankees	94	68	.580	—	50‍–‍31	44‍–‍37
Boston Red Sox	89	73	.549	5	48‍–‍33	41‍–‍40
Tampa Bay Rays	77	85	.475	17	41‍–‍40	36‍–‍45
Baltimore Orioles	75	87	.463	19	39‍–‍42	36‍–‍45

==== American League Wild Card ====
Division leaders
Team	W	L	Pct.
Toronto Blue Jays	94	68	.580
Seattle Mariners	90	72	.556
Cleveland Guardians	88	74	.543

Wild Card teams (Top 3 teams qualify for postseason)
Team	W	L	Pct.	GB
New York Yankees	94	68	.580	+7
Boston Red Sox	89	73	.549	+2
Detroit Tigers	87	75	.537	—
Houston Astros	87	75	.537	—
Kansas City Royals	82	80	.506	5
Texas Rangers	81	81	.500	6
Tampa Bay Rays	77	85	.475	10
Athletics	76	86	.469	11
Baltimore Orioles	75	87	.463	12
Los Angeles Angels	72	90	.444	15
Minnesota Twins	70	92	.432	17
Chicago White Sox	60	102	.370	27

==== Record vs. opponents ====
===== Record vs. American League =====
2025 American League record Source: MLB Standings Grid – 2025
Team	ATH	BAL	BOS	CWS	CLE	DET	HOU	KC	LAA	MIN	NYY	SEA	TB	TEX	TOR	NL
Athletics	—	4–2	3–3	5–1	2–4	4–2	8–5	4–2	4–9	4–3	2–4	6–7	3–3	5–8	2–5	20–28
Baltimore	2–4	—	5–8	6–0	3–4	1–5	3–4	2–4	5–1	0–6	4–9	5–1	7–6	2–4	6–7	24–24
Boston	3–3	8–5	—	4–3	4–2	2–4	4–2	4–2	1–5	3–3	9–4	3–3	10–3	3–4	5–8	26–22
Chicago	1–5	0–6	3–4	—	2–11	5–8	3–3	3–10	3–3	8–5	1–6	1–5	4–2	2–4	3–3	21–27
Cleveland	4–2	4–3	2–4	11–2	—	8–5	4–2	8–5	3–3	9–4	3–3	2–4	5–2	2–4	3–3	20–28
Detroit	2–4	5–1	4–2	8–5	5–8	—	4–2	9–4	5–2	8–5	4–2	2–4	3–3	2–4	3–4	23–25
Houston	5–8	4–3	2–4	3–3	2–4	2–4	—	3–3	8–5	5–1	3-3	5–8	3–4	7–6	4–2	31–17
Kansas City	2–4	4–2	2–4	10–3	5–8	4–9	3–3	—	3–3	7–6	0–6	3–4	3–3	6-1	4–2	26–22
Los Angeles	9–4	1–5	5–1	3–3	3–3	2–5	5–8	3–3	—	2–4	3–4	4–9	3–3	5–8	2–4	22–26
Minnesota	3–4	6–0	3–3	5–8	4–9	5–8	1–5	6–7	4–2	—	2–4	3–4	3–3	3–3	2–4	20–28
New York	4–2	9–4	4–9	6–1	3–3	2–4	3–3	6–0	4–3	4–2	—	5–1	9–4	4–2	5–8	26–22
Seattle	7–6	1–5	3–3	5–1	4–2	4–2	8–5	4–3	9–4	4–3	1–5	—	3–3	10–3	2–4	25–23
Tampa Bay	3–3	6–7	3–10	2–4	2–5	3–3	4–3	3–3	3–3	3–3	4–9	3–3	—	3–3	7–6	28–20
Texas	8–5	4–2	4–3	4–2	4–2	4–2	6–7	1-6	8–5	3–3	2–4	3–10	3–3	—	2–4	25–23
Toronto	5–2	7–6	8–5	3–3	3–3	4–3	2–4	2–4	4–2	4–2	8–5	4–2	6–7	4–2	—	30–18

Updated with the results of all games through September 28, 2025.

===== Record vs. National League =====
2025 American League record vs. National League Source: MLB Standings
Team	AZ	ATL	CHC	CIN	COL	LAD	MIA	MIL	NYM	PHI	PIT	SD	SF	STL	WSH
Athletics	1–2	2–1	0–3	3–0	2–1	1–2	2–1	1–2	1–2	1–2	1–2	1–2	1–5	1–2	2–1
Baltimore	1–2	3–0	1–2	1–2	2–1	2–1	1–2	1–2	2–1	1–2	3–0	3–0	1–2	1–2	1–5
Boston	1–2	3–3	1–2	2–1	3–0	2–1	2–1	0–3	2–1	1–2	1–2	1–2	1–2	3–0	3–0
Chicago	1–2	1–2	1–5	2–1	2–1	0–3	2–1	1–2	1–2	2–1	3–0	1–2	2–1	0–3	2–1
Cleveland	1–2	0–3	0–3	1–5	2–1	1–2	2–1	2–1	3–0	1–2	3–0	0–3	2–1	0–3	2–1
Detroit	3–0	0–3	2–1	1–2	3–0	0–3	1–2	1–2	1–2	1–2	2–4	2–1	3–0	2–1	1–2
Houston	3–0	2–1	2–1	2–1	4–2	3–0	2–1	1–2	2–1	3–0	2–1	2–1	0–3	1–2	2–1
Kansas City	2–1	2–1	2–1	1–2	3–0	1–2	1–2	1–2	1–2	1–2	3–0	1–2	2–1	3–3	2–1
Los Angeles	2–1	2–1	0–3	1–2	1–2	6–0	1–2	0–3	0–3	2–1	1–2	1–2	2–1	2–1	1–2
Minnesota	1–2	0–3	2–1	1–2	1–2	1–2	1–2	2–4	2–1	1–2	2–1	2–1	3–0	0–3	1–2
New York	1–2	2–1	1–2	1–2	2–1	1–2	0–3	3–0	3–3	1–2	2–1	2–1	1–2	3–0	3–0
Seattle	0–3	2–1	2–1	2–1	3–0	0–3	2–1	1–2	1–2	0–3	3–0	5–1	0–3	3–0	1–2
Tampa Bay	2–1	2–1	1–2	0–3	2–1	1–2	3–3	2–1	3–0	0–3	2–1	3–0	2–1	2–1	3–0
Texas	2–4	3–0	1–2	2–1	3–0	1–2	0–3	3–0	2–1	0–3	2–1	1–2	1–2	2–1	2–1
Toronto	2–1	2–1	2–1	2–1	3–0	1–2	2–1	1–2	0–3	2–4	1–2	3–0	3–0	3–0	3–0

Updated with the results of all games through September 28, 2025.

=== Game log ===
Past games legend
Orioles Win (#bfb)	Orioles Loss (#fbb)	Game postponed (#bbb)	Eliminated from playoff spot (#933)
Bold denotes an Orioles pitcher

2025 Game Log: 75–87 (Home: 39–41; Road: 36–46)
March/April: 12–18 (Home: 7–7; Road: 5–11)

#	Date	Opponent	Score	Win	Loss	Save	Stadium	Attendance	Record	Streak/ Box
1	March 27	@ Blue Jays	12–2	**Eflin** (1–0)	Berríos (0–1)	—	Rogers Centre	40,734	1–0	W1
2	March 28	@ Blue Jays	2–8	Gausman (1–0)	**Morton** (0–1)	—	Rogers Centre	26,289	1–1	L1
3	March 29	@ Blue Jays	9–5	**Kremer** (1–0)	Lovelady (0–1)	—	Rogers Centre	27,005	2–1	W1
4	March 30	@ Blue Jays	1–3	Bassitt (1–0)	**Sugano** (0–1)	Hoffman (1)	Rogers Centre	21,069	2–2	L1
5	March 31	Red Sox	8–5	**Domínguez** (1–0)	Newcomb (0–1)	—	**Camden Yards**	45,002	3–2	W1
6	April 2	Red Sox	0–3	Crochet (1–0)	**Eflin** (1–1)	Chapman (1)	**Camden Yards**	18,146	3–3	L1
7	April 3	Red Sox	4–8	Kelly (1–0)	**Morton** (0–2)	—	**Camden Yards**	16,656	3–4	L2
8	April 4	@ Royals	2–8	Lugo (1–0)	**Kremer** (1–1)	—	Kauffman Stadium	14,196	3–5	L3
9	April 5	@ Royals	8–1	**Sugano** (1–1)	Wacha (0–2)	—	Kauffman Stadium	14,383	4–5	W1
10	April 6	@ Royals	1–4	Bubic (2–0)	**Povich** (0–1)	Estévez (2)	Kauffman Stadium	19,100	4–6	L1
11	April 7	@ Diamondbacks	5–1	**Eflin** (2–1)	Gallen (1–2)	—	Chase Field	20,333	5–6	W1
12	April 8	@ Diamondbacks	3–4	Kelly (2–1)	**Morton** (0–3)	Martínez (2)	Chase Field	23,843	5–7	L1
13	April 9	@ Diamondbacks	0–9	Pfaadt (2–1)	**Kremer** (1–2)	—	Chase Field	22,411	5–8	L2
―	April 11	Blue Jays	Postponed (rain); Makeup: July 29							
14	April 12	Blue Jays	5–4	**Baker** (1–0)	Francis (1–2)	**Bautista** (1)	**Camden Yards**	22,130	6–8	W1
15	April 13	Blue Jays	6–7	Hoffman (2–0)	**Bowman** (0–1)	—	**Camden Yards**	27,193	6–9	L1
16	April 15	Guardians	3–6	Allen (1–1)	**Morton** (0–4)	Clase (2)	**Camden Yards**	14,203	6–10	L2
17	April 16	Guardians	9–1	**Kremer** (2–2)	Williams (1–1)	—	**Camden Yards**	13,964	7–10	W1
18	April 17	Guardians	6–2	**Sugano** (2–1)	Bibee (1–2)	—	**Camden Yards**	16,201	8–10	W2
19	April 18	Reds	3–8	Abbott (2–0)	**Povich** (0–2)	—	**Camden Yards**	42,587	8–11	L1
20	April 19	Reds	9–5	**Domínguez** (2–0)	Greene (2–2)	**Bautista** (2)	**Camden Yards**	28,534	9–11	W1
21	April 20	Reds	2–24	Rogers (1–0)	**Morton** (0–5)	Wynne (1)	**Camden Yards**	19,053	9–12	L1
22	April 22	@ Nationals	0–7	Parker (3–1)	**Kremer** (2–3)	—	Nationals Park	29,504	9–13	L2
23	April 23	@ Nationals	3–4	López (1–0)	**Soto** (0–1)	Finnegan (9)	Nationals Park	22,246	9–14	L3
24	April 24	@ Nationals	2–1	**Povich** (2–1)	Gore (2–3)	**Bautista** (3)	Nationals Park	23,058	10–14	W1
―	April 25	@ Tigers	Postponed (rain); Makeup: April 26							
25	April 26 (1)	@ Tigers	3–4	Mize (4–1)	**Young** (0–1)	Vest (3)	Comerica Park	28,509	10–15	L1
26	April 26 (2)	@ Tigers	2–6	Hurter (1–0)	**Morton** (0–6)	—	Comerica Park	21,422	10–16	L2
27	April 27	@ Tigers	0–7	Skubal (3–2)	**Kremer** (2–4)	—	Comerica Park	28,613	10–17	L3
28	April 28	Yankees	4–3	**Sugano** (3–1)	Warren (1–1)	**Bautista** (4)	**Camden Yards**	22,775	11–17	W1
29	April 29	Yankees	3–15	Rodón (4–3)	**Gibson** (0–1)	—	**Camden Yards**	22,164	11–18	L1
30	April 30	Yankees	5–4	**Baker** (2–0)	Carrasco (2–2)	**Bautista** (5)	**Camden Yards**	22,381	12–18	W1

May: 9–18 (Home: 4–10; Road: 5–8)

#	Date	Opponent	Score	Win	Loss	Save	Stadium	Attendance	Record	Streak/ Box
31	May 2	Royals	3–0	**Kremer** (3–4)	Wacha (1–4)	**Bautista** (6)	**Camden Yards**	26,364	13–18	W2
32	May 3	Royals	0–4	Bubic (3–2)	**Sugano** (3–2)	—	**Camden Yards**	19,348	13–19	L1
33	May 4	Royals	6–11	Zerpa (2–0)	**Canó** (0–1)	—	**Camden Yards**	31,956	13–20	L2
34	May 6	@ Twins	1–9	López (3–2)	**Povich** (1–3)	—	Target Field	19,779	13–21	L3
35	May 7	@ Twins	2–5	Coulombe (1–0)	**Morton** (0–7)	Durán (5)	Target Field	16,417	13–22	L4
36	May 8	@ Twins	2–5	Jax (1–2)	**Canó** (0–2)	Durán (6)	Target Field	17,410	13–23	L5
37	May 9	@ Angels	4–1	**Sugano** (4–2)	Hendricks (1–4)	**Bautista** (7)	Angel Stadium	30,778	14–23	W1
38	May 10	@ Angels	2–5	Kochanowicz (2–5)	**Gibson** (0–2)	—	Angel Stadium	27,975	14–24	L1
39	May 11	@ Angels	7–3	**Eflin** (3–1)	Anderson (2–1)	—	Angel Stadium	29,460	15–24	W1
	May 13	Twins	Postponed (rain); Makeup: May 14							
40	May 14 (1)	Twins	3–6	Stewart (1–0)	**Kremer** (3–5)	Durán (8)	**Camden Yards**	10,169	15–25	L1
41	May 14 (2)	Twins	6–8	Funderburk (1–0)	**Canó** (0–3)	Sands (1)	**Camden Yards**	10,169	15–26	L2
42	May 15	Twins	0–4	Paddack (2–3)	**Sugano** (4–3)	—	**Camden Yards**	30,926	15–27	L3
43	May 16	Nationals	4–5	López (6–0)	**Bautista** (0–1)	Finnegan (14)	**Camden Yards**	21,171	15–28	L4
44	May 17	Nationals	6–10	Irvin (3–1)	**Gibson** (0–3)	—	**Camden Yards**	28,208	15–29	L5
45	May 18	Nationals	4–10	Soroka (1–2)	**Eflin** (3–2)	—	**Camden Yards**	37,264	15–30	L6
46	May 19	@ Brewers	4–5	Uribe (2–0)	**Canó** (0–4)	Megill (7)	American Family Field	22,319	15–31	L7
47	May 20	@ Brewers	2–5	Henderson (3–0)	**McDermott** (0–1)	Uribe (1)	American Family Field	22,778	15–32	L8
48	May 21	@ Brewers	8–4 (11)	**Baker** (3–0)	Alexander (2–4)	—	American Family Field	30,554	16–32	W1
	May 22	@ Red Sox	Postponed (rain); Makeup: May 23							
49	May 23 (1)	@ Red Sox	5–19	Whitlock (3–0)	**Domínguez** (2–1)	—	Fenway Park	31,150	16–33	L1
	May 23 (2)	@ Red Sox	Postponed (rain); Makeup: May 24							
50	May 24 (1)	@ Red Sox	5–6 (10)	Weissert (2–1)	**Soto** (0–2)	—	Fenway Park	30,958	16–34	L2
51	May 24 (2)	@ Red Sox	2–1	**Kittredge** (1–0)	Bernardino (2–2)	**Domínguez** (1)	Fenway Park	34,604	17–34	W1
52	May 25	@ Red Sox	5–1	**Kremer** (4–5)	Buehler (4–2)	—	Fenway Park	36,824	18–34	W2
53	May 26	Cardinals	5–2	**Morton** (1–7)	Fedde (3–4)	**Bautista** (8)	**Camden Yards**	21,717	19–34	W3
54	May 27	Cardinals	4–7	Matz (3–1)	**Baker** (3–1)	Helsley (11)	**Camden Yards**	13,779	19–35	L1
55	May 28	Cardinals	4–6	King (2–0)	**Povich** (1–4)	Helsley (12)	**Camden Yards**	14,491	19–36	L2
56	May 30	White Sox	2–1	**Eflin** (4–2)	Burke (3–6)	**Bautista** (9)	**Camden Yards**	22,108	20–36	W1
57	May 31	White Sox	4–2	**Kremer** (5–5)	Martin (2–6)	**Bautista** (10)	**Camden Yards**	23,470	21–36	W2

June: 16–11 (Home: 8–5; Road: 8–6)

#	Date	Opponent	Score	Win	Loss	Save	Stadium	Attendance	Record	Streak/ Box
58	June 1	White Sox	3–2	**Morton** (2–7)	Houser (1–1)	**Baker** (1)	**Camden Yards**	33,037	22–36	W3
59	June 3	@ Mariners	5–1	**Sugano** (5–3)	Kirby (0–3)	—	T-Mobile Park	21,089	23–36	W4
60	June 4	@ Mariners	3–2	**Canó** (1–4)	Vargas (1–4)	**Bautista** (11)	T-Mobile Park	19,231	24–36	W5
61	June 5	@ Mariners	4–3	**Eflin** (5–2)	Woo (5–3)	**Baker** (2)	T-Mobile Park	27,887	25–36	W6
62	June 6	@ Athletics	4–5	Sears (5–5)	**Kremer** (5–6)	Miller (13)	Sutter Health Park	8,424	25–37	L1
63	June 7	@ Athletics	7–4	**Akin** (1–0)	Severino (1–6)	**Bautista** (12)	Sutter Health Park	9,185	26–37	W1
64	June 8	@ Athletics	1–5	Newcomb (1–4)	**Sugano** (5–4)	—	Sutter Health Park	8,836	26–38	L1
65	June 10	Tigers	3–5	Lee (3–0)	**Povich** (1–5)	Vest (11)	**Camden Yards**	20,291	26–39	L2
66	June 11	Tigers	10–1	**Eflin** (6–2)	Mize (6–2)	—	**Camden Yards**	18,630	27–39	W1
67	June 12	Tigers	1–4	Skubal (7–2)	**Kremer** (5–7)	Vest (12)	**Camden Yards**	18,800	27–40	L1
68	June 13	Angels	2–0	**Morton** (3–7)	Kochanowicz (3–8)	**Bautista** (13)	**Camden Yards**	20,204	28–40	W1
69	June 14	Angels	6–5	**Akin** (2–0)	Anderson (2–4)	**Bautista** (14)	**Camden Yards**	26,313	29–40	W2
70	June 15	Angels	11–2	**Povich** (2–5)	Kikuchi (2–6)	—	**Camden Yards**	33,370	30–40	W3
71	June 16	@ Rays	1–7	Pepiot (4–6)	**Eflin** (6–3)	—	George M. Steinbrenner Field	10,046	30–41	L1
72	June 17	@ Rays	5–1	**Kremer** (6–7)	Littell (6–7)	—	George M. Steinbrenner Field	10,046	31–41	W1
73	June 18	@ Rays	8–12	Montgomery (1–1)	**Kittredge** (1–1)	—	George M. Steinbrenner Field	10,046	31–42	L1
74	June 19	@ Rays	4–1	**Morton** (4–7)	Rasmussen (6–5)	**Bautista** (15)	George M. Steinbrenner Field	10,046	32–42	W1
75	June 20	@ Yankees	5–3	**Blewett** (3–0)	Weaver (1–2)	**Bautista** (16)	Yankee Stadium	47,034	33–42	W2
76	June 21	@ Yankees	0–9	Schmidt (4–3)	**Eflin** (6–4)	—	Yankee Stadium	46,142	33–43	L1
77	June 22	@ Yankees	2–4	Cruz (2–3)	**Baker** (3–2)	Williams (10)	Yankee Stadium	45,571	33–44	L2
78	June 23	Rangers	6–0	**Rogers** (1–0)	Corbin (4–7)	—	**Camden Yards**	13,929	34–44	W1
79	June 24	Rangers	5–6 (10)	Jackson (2–4)	**Domínguez** (2–2)	Garcia (6)	**Camden Yards**	16,909	34–45	L1
80	June 25	Rangers	0–7	deGrom (8–2)	**Young** (0–2)	—	**Camden Yards**	22,828	34–46	L2
81	June 27	Rays	22–8	**Sugano** (6–4)	Orze (1–1)	—	**Camden Yards**	20,047	35–46	W1
82	June 28	Rays	3–11	Littell (7–7)	**Eflin** (6–5)	—	**Camden Yards**	30,491	35–47	L1
83	June 29	Rays	5–1	**Kremer** (7–7)	Bradley (5–6)	—	**Camden Yards**	19,226	36–47	W1
84	June 30	@ Rangers	10–6 (11)	**Akin** (3–0)	Milner (1–2)	—	Globe Life Field	27,420	37–47	W2

July: 13–12 (Home: 8–5; Road: 5–7)

#	Date	Opponent	Score	Win	Loss	Save	Stadium	Attendance	Record	Streak/ Box
85	July 1	@ Rangers	2–10	deGrom (9–2)	**Young** (0–3)	Latz (1)	Globe Life Field	30,933	37–48	L1
86	July 2	@ Rangers	0–6	Eovaldi (5–3)	**Sugano** (6–5)	Dunning (2)	Globe Life Field	27,636	37–49	L2
87	July 4	@ Braves	3–2	**Morton** (5–7)	Strider (3–7)	**Bautista** (17)	Truist Park	40,249	38–49	W1
88	July 5	@ Braves	9–6 (10)	**Bautista** (1–1)	Montero (0–1)	**Canó** (1)	Truist Park	37,170	39–49	W2
89	July 6	@ Braves	2–1	**Rogers** (2–0)	Holmes (4–8)	**Domínguez** (2)	Truist Park	34,012	40–49	W3
90	July 8	Mets	6–7 (10)	Díaz (4–0)	**Canó** (1–5)	Brazobán (2)	**Camden Yards**	35,200	40–50	L1
―	July 9	Mets	Postponed (rain); Makeup: July 10							
91	July 10 (1)	Mets	3–1	**Wolfram** (1–0)	Stanek (2–5)	**Bautista** (18)	**Camden Yards**	25,262	41–50	W1
92	July 10 (2)	Mets	7–3	**Sugano** (7–5)	Hagenman (0–1)	—	**Camden Yards**	17,961	42–50	W2
93	July 11	Marlins	5–2	**Kremer** (8–7)	Cabrera (3–4)	—	**Camden Yards**	22,213	43–50	W3
94	July 12	Marlins	0–6	Junk (4–1)	**Rogers** (2–1)	—	**Camden Yards**	34,332	43–51	L1
95	July 13	Marlins	1–11	Pérez (3–2)	**Young** (0–4)	—	**Camden Yards**	17,759	43–52	L2
ASG	July 15	AL @ NL	–			—	Truist Park		—	
96	July 18	@ Rays	1–11	Bradley (6–6)	**Morton** (5–8)	—	George M. Steinbrenner Field	10,046	43–53	L3
97	July 19	@ Rays	3–4	Uceta (6–2)	**Domínguez** (2–3)	Fairbanks (16)	George M. Steinbrenner Field	10,046	43–54	L4
98	July 20	@ Rays	5–3	**Rogers** (3–1)	Pepiot (6–8)	**Bautista** (19)	George M. Steinbrenner Field	9,195	44–54	W1
99	July 21	@ Guardians	5–10	Bibee (6–9)	**Selby** (0–1)	—	Progressive Field	21,748	44–55	L1
100	July 22	@ Guardians	3–6	Cantillo (2–0)	**Young** (0–5)	Clase (22)	Progressive Field	22,714	44–56	L2
101	July 23	@ Guardians	2–3	Gaddis (1–1)	**Selby** (0–2)	Clase (23)	Progressive Field	30,476	44–57	L3
102	July 24	@ Guardians	4–3	**Morton** (6–8)	Allen (6–9)	**Soto** (1)	Progressive Field	26,223	45–57	W1
103	July 25	Rockies	5–6	Bird (4–1)	**Kittredge** (1–2)	Halvorsen (10)	**Camden Yards**	25,090	45–58	L1
104	July 26	Rockies	18–0	**Rogers** (4–1)	Senzatela (4–14)	—	**Camden Yards**	20,188	46–58	W1
105	July 27	Rockies	5–1	**Sugano** (8–5)	Gomber (0–5)	—	**Camden Yards**	16,407	47–58	W2
106	July 28	Blue Jays	11–4	**Martin** (1–0)	Bassitt (11–5)	—	**Camden Yards**	20,176	48–58	W3
107	July 29 (1)	Blue Jays	16–4	**Morton** (7–8)	Lucas (3–3)	—	**Camden Yards**	16,194	49–58	W4
108	July 29 (2)	Blue Jays	3–2	**Kittredge** (2–2)	Hoffman (6–4)	**Martin** (1)	**Camden Yards**	14,929	50–58	W5
109	July 30	Blue Jays	8–9	Fluharty (4–2)	**Canó** (1–6)	Hoffman (25)	**Camden Yards**	17,049	50–59	L1

August: 11–17 (Home: 4–10; Road: 7–7)

#	Date	Opponent	Score	Win	Loss	Save	Stadium	Attendance	Record	Streak/ Box
110	August 1	@ Cubs	0–1	Horton (5–3)	**Rogers** (4–2)	Palencia (15)	Wrigley Field	40,520	50–60	L2
111	August 2	@ Cubs	4–3	**Wolfram** (2–0)	Thielbar (2–3)	**Akin** (1)	Wrigley Field	40,781	51–60	W1
112	August 3	@ Cubs	3–5	Palencia (1–2)	**Akin** (3–1)	—	Wrigley Field	39,430	51–61	L1
113	August 4	@ Phillies	3–13	Luzardo (10–4)	**Povich** (2–6)	—	Citizens Bank Park	41,099	51–62	L2
114	August 5	@ Phillies	0–5	Walker (4–5)	**Kremer** (8–8)	—	Citizens Bank Park	43,660	51–63	L3
115	August 6	@ Phillies	5–0	**Rogers** (5–2)	Suárez (8–5)	—	Citizens Bank Park	42,030	52–63	W1
116	August 8	Athletics	3–2	**Sugano** (9–5)	Ginn (2–4)	**Akin** (2)	**Camden Yards**	20,796	53–63	W2
117	August 9	Athletics	3–11	Perkins (1–2)	**Young** (0–6)	—	**Camden Yards**	30,078	53–64	L1
118	August 10	Athletics	2–3	Alvarado (1–0)	**Akin** (3–2)	—	**Camden Yards**	23,183	53–65	L2
119	August 12	Mariners	0–1	Kirby (8–5)	**Kremer** (8–9)	Muñoz (28)	**Camden Yards**	19,356	53–66	L3
120	August 13	Mariners	4–3	**Akin** (4–2)	Brash (1–1)	—	**Camden Yards**	17,290	54–66	W1
121	August 14	Mariners	5–3	**Sugano** (10–5)	Evans (6–5)	**Enns** (1)	**Camden Yards**	14,083	55–66	W2
122	August 15	@ Astros	7–0	**Young** (1–6)	Valdez (11–6)	—	Daikin Park	33,654	56–66	W3
123	August 16	@ Astros	4–5 (12)	De Los Santos (4–3)	**Akin** (4–3)	—	Daikin Park	37,641	56–67	L1
124	August 17	@ Astros	12–0	**Kremer** (9–9)	Javier (1–1)	—	Daikin Park	36,411	57–67	W1
125	August 18	@ Red Sox	6–3	**Rogers** (6–2)	May (7–9)	—	Fenway Park	36,961	58–67	W2
126	August 19	@ Red Sox	4–3 (11)	**Canó** (2–6)	Whitlock (5–3)	**Martin** (2)	Fenway Park	37,435	59–67	W3
127	August 21	Astros	2–7	Alexander (4–1)	**Young** (1–7)	—	**Camden Yards**	18,061	59–68	L1
128	August 22	Astros	7–10	Okert (2–2)	**Povich** (2–7)	Abreu (2)	**Camden Yards**	24,224	59–69	L2
129	August 23	Astros	8–9	Blubaugh (2–1)	**Enns** (1–2)	Abreu (3)	**Camden Yards**	30,158	59–70	L3
130	August 24	Astros	3–2	**Rogers** (7–2)	Arrighetti (1–5)	**Akin** (3)	**Camden Yards**	19,746	60–70	W1
131	August 25	Red Sox	3–4	Fitts (2–4)	**Sugano** (10–6)	Chapman (25)	**Camden Yards**	15,740	60–71	L1
132	August 26	Red Sox	0–5	Giolito (9–2)	**Bradish** (0–1)	—	**Camden Yards**	14,776	60–72	L2
133	August 27	Red Sox	2–3	Weissert (6–4)	**Akin** (4–6)	Chapman (26)	**Camden Yards**	16,790	60–73	L3
134	August 28	Red Sox	2–3	Hicks (2–7)	**Garcia** (0–1)	Matz (2)	**Camden Yards**	15,374	60–74	L4
135	August 29	@ Giants	8–15	Bivens (3–3)	**Kremer** (9–10)	—	Oracle Park	40,043	60–75	L5
136	August 30	@ Giants	11–1	**Rogers** (8–2)	Seymour (0–2)	—	Oracle Park	37,711	61–75	W1
137	August 31	@ Giants	2–13	Verlander (3–10)	**Sugano** (10–7)	Bivens (1)	Oracle Park	39,220	61–76	L1

September: 14–11 (Home: 8–5; Road: 6–6)

#	Date	Opponent	Score	Win	Loss	Save	Stadium	Attendance	Record	Streak/ Box
138	September 1	@ Padres	4–3	**Enns** (2–2)	Adam (8–4)	**Akin** (4)	Petco Park	45,586	62–76	W1
139	September 2	@ Padres	6–2	**Wells** (1–0)	Darvish (3–5)	—	Petco Park	42,536	63–76	W2
140	September 3	@ Padres	7–5	**Povich** (3–7)	Cortés Jr. (2–4)	**Canó** (2)	Petco Park	35,019	64–76	W3
141	September 5	Dodgers	2–1	**Canó** (3–6)	Scott (1–3)	—	**Camden Yards**	25,481	65–76	W4
142	September 6	Dodgers	4–3	**Suárez** (1–0)	Treinen (1–3)	—	**Camden Yards**	42,612	66–76	W5
143	September 7	Dodgers	2–5	Kershaw (10–2)	**Sugano** (10–8)	Dreyer (3)	**Camden Yards**	27,874	66–77	L1
144	September 9	Pirates	3–2 (11)	**Enns** (3–2)	Moreta (1–1)	—	**Camden Yards**	15,488	67–77	W1
145	September 10	Pirates	2–1 (10)	**Suárez** (2–0)	Nicolas (1–1)	—	**Camden Yards**	18,210	68–77	W2
146	September 11	Pirates	3–2	**Wolfram** (3–0)	Holderman (0–2)	**Akin** (5)	**Camden Yards**	13,957	69–77	W3
147	September 12	@ Blue Jays	1–6	Fisher (5–0)	**Enns** (3–3)	—	Rogers Centre	34,376	69–78	L1
148	September 13	@ Blue Jays	4–5	Fisher (6–0)	**Canó** (3–7)	—	Rogers Centre	42,461	69–79	L2
149	September 14	@ Blue Jays	2–11	Bieber (3–1)	**Wolfram** (3–1)	—	Rogers Centre	42,032	69–80	L3
150	September 15	@ White Sox	4–1	**Bradish** (1–1)	Wilson (2–2)	**Enns** (2)	Rate Field	11,020	70–80	W1
151	September 16	@ White Sox	8–7	**Kremer** (10–10)	Smith (6–8)	**Akin** (6)	Rate Field	12,428	71–80	W2
152	September 17	@ White Sox	3–1	**Wells** (2–0)	Pérez (1–6)	**Akin** (7)	Rate Field	10,919	72–80	W3
153	September 18	Yankees	0–7	Fried (18–5)	**Povich** (3–8)	—	**Camden Yards**	25,253	72–81	L1
154	September 19	Yankees	4–2	**Rogers** (9–2)	Warren (8–8)	**Akin** (8)	**Camden Yards**	26,269	73–81	W1
155	September 20	Yankees	1–6	Rodón (17–9)	**Sugano** (10–9)	—	**Camden Yards**	37,675	73–82	L1
156	September 21	Yankees	1–7 (10)	Bednar (6–5)	**Strowd** (0–1)	—	**Camden Yards**	31,974	73–83	L2
157	September 23	Rays	6–0	**Kremer** (11–10)	Pepiot (11–12)	—	**Camden Yards**	15,267	74–83	W1
158	September 24	Rays	2–6	Uceta (10–3)	**Wells** (2–1)	—	**Camden Yards**	18,367	74–84	L1
159	September 25	Rays	6–5	**Akin** (5–4)	Kelly (2–5)	—	**Camden Yards**	16,777	75–84	W1
160	September 26	@ Yankees	4–8	Warren (9–8)	**Rogers** (9–3)	—	Yankee Stadium	44,596	75–85	L1
161	September 27	@ Yankees	1–6	Schlittler (4–3)	**Sugano** (10–10)	—	Yankee Stadium	46,085	75–86	L2
162	September 28	@ Yankees	2–3	Williams (4–6)	**Garcia** (0–2)	Bednar (27)	Yankee Stadium	45,004	75–87	L3

== Roster ==
2025 Baltimore Orioles
Roster
Pitchers: 45 Keegan Akin; 43 Bryan Baker; 74 Félix Bautista; 67 Scott Blewett; 51 Matt Bowman; 38 Kyle Bradish; 78 Yennier Canó; 66 José Castillo; 66 Roansy Contreras; 56 Seranthony Domínguez; 62 Shawn Dubin; 24 Zach Eflin; 71 Dietrich Enns; 72 José Espada; 50 Rico Garcia; 48 Kyle Gibson; 76 Yaramil Hiraldo; 39 Andrew Kittredge; 64 Dean Kremer; 48 Corbin Martin; 59 Chayce McDermott; 50 Charlie Morton; 58 Cionel Pérez; 53 Cody Poteet; 37 Cade Povich; 83 Carson Ragsdale; 83 Elvin Rodríguez; 28 Trevor Rogers; 60 Colin Selby; 65 Gregory Soto; 57 Kade Strowd; 49 Albert Suárez; 19 Tomoyuki Sugano; 68 Tyler Wells; 86 Grant Wolfram; 63 Brandon Young	Catchers: 29 Samuel Basallo; 98 Maverick Handley; 70 Alex Jackson; 35 Adley Rutschman; 99 Gary Sánchez; 25 Jacob Stallings; 41 Chadwick Tromp; Infielders: 2 Gunnar Henderson; 7 Jackson Holliday; 65 Vimael Machín; 3 Jorge Mateo; 16 Coby Mayo; 6 Ryan Mountcastle; 32 Ryan O'Hearn; 26 Emmanuel Rivera; 29 Ramón Urías; 54 Terrin Vavra; 52 Luis Vázquez; 11 Jordan Westburg	Outfielders: 80 Jordyn Adams; 25 Greg Allen; 12 Dylan Beavers; 40 Vidal Bruján; 15 Dylan Carlson; 17 Colton Cowser; 67 Cooper Hummel; 82 Jeremiah Jackson; 56 Daniel Johnson; 13 Heston Kjerstad; 12 Ramón Laureano; 31 Cedric Mullins; 41 Ryan Noda; 9 Tyler O'Neill; Other batters: 91 David Bañuelos	Manager: 18 Brandon Hyde; 36 Tony Mansolino; Coaches: 92 Grant Anders (development); 61 Cody Asche (hitting); 46 Buck Britton (coach); 23 Robinson Chirinos (bench); 70 Tim Cossins (field coordinator/catching); 75 Drew French (pitching); 97 Sherman Johnson (assistant hitting); 81 Tommy Joseph (assistant hitting); 89 Ryan Klimek (pitching strategy); 36 Tony Mansolino (third base); 77 Mitch Plassmeyer (assistant pitching); 55 Anthony Sanders (first base)

== Player stats ==
= Indicates team leader

=== Batting ===
Note: G = Games played; AB = At bats; R = Runs scored; H = Hits; 2B = Doubles; 3B = Triples; HR = Home runs; RBI = Runs batted in; SB = Stolen bases; BB = Walks; AVG = Batting average; SLG = Slugging average

Player	G	AB	R	H	2B	3B	HR	RBI	SB	BB	AVG	SLG
Jackson Holliday	149	586	70	142	21	3	17	55	17	56	.242	.375
Gunnar Henderson	154	577	85	158	34	5	17	68	30	62	.274	.438
Ryan Mountcastle	89	332	34	83	18	0	7	35	3	15	.250	.367
Jordan Westburg	85	328	59	87	10	1	17	41	1	17	.265	.457
Colton Cowser	92	327	36	64	14	0	16	40	14	27	.196	.385
Adley Rutschman	90	322	37	71	16	2	9	29	0	40	.220	.366
Cedric Mullins	91	314	42	72	19	0	15	49	14	34	.229	.433
Ryan O'Hearn	94	311	45	88	15	1	13	43	3	42	.283	.463
Coby Mayo	85	263	30	57	12	0	11	28	3	27	.217	.388
Ramón Laureano	82	259	45	75	17	0	15	46	4	22	.290	.529
Ramón Urías	77	258	27	64	12	0	8	34	2	21	.248	.388
Dylan Carlson	83	217	17	44	9	1	6	20	3	21	.203	.336
Tyler O'Neill	54	181	22	36	6	1	9	26	4	22	.199	.392
Jeremiah Jackson	48	170	20	47	10	2	5	21	0	11	.276	.447
Heston Kjerstad	54	156	16	30	5	2	4	19	1	6	.192	.327
Emmanuel Rivera	42	120	5	30	4	0	0	13	1	6	.250	.283
Dylan Beavers	35	110	16	25	5	1	4	14	2	26	.227	.400
Samuel Basallo	31	109	10	18	6	0	4	15	0	6	.165	.330
Alex Jackson	36	91	17	20	8	0	5	8	0	5	.220	.473
Gary Sánchez	29	91	13	21	2	0	5	24	0	4	.231	.418
Jorge Mateo	42	79	9	14	4	0	1	3	15	4	.177	.266
Luis Vázquez	32	50	6	8	1	0	1	3	2	3	.160	.240
Maverick Handley	16	41	2	3	0	0	0	3	0	2	.073	.073
Jacob Stallings	14	35	1	4	1	0	0	3	0	1	.114	.143
Daniel Johnson	17	24	8	5	1	0	0	0	1	2	.208	.250
Chadwick Tromp	6	16	2	3	1	0	1	1	0	0	.188	.188
Greg Allen	7	14	1	0	0	0	0	0	0	0	.000	.000
Ryan Noda	7	13	0	2	0	0	0	1	1	1	.154	.154
Vimael Machín	4	11	1	1	0	0	1	1	0	1	.091	.364
Jordyn Adams	10	5	1	0	0	0	0	0	0	0	.000	.000
Trevor Rogers	1	2	0	0	0	0	0	0	0	0	.000	.000
Terrin Vavra	1	1	0	0	0	0	0	0	0	0	.000	.000
Vidal Bruján	1	1	0	1	0	0	0	0	0	0	1.000	1.000
David Banuelos	1	1	0	0	0	0	0	0	0	0	.000	.000
Cooper Hummel	1	1	0	0	0	0	0	0	0	0	.000	.000
Totals	162	5416	677	1273	251	19	191	643	121	484	.235	.394

Source:Baseball Reference

=== Pitching ===
Note: W = Wins; L = Losses; ERA = Earned run average; G = Games pitched; GS = Games started; SV = Saves; IP = Innings pitched; H = Hits allowed; R = Runs allowed; ER = Earned runs allowed; BB = Walks allowed; SO = Strikeouts

Player	W	L	ERA	G	GS	SV	IP	H	R	ER	BB	SO
Dean Kremer	11	10	4.19	31	29	0	171.2	163	83	80	45	142
Tomoyuki Sugano	10	10	4.64	30	30	0	157.0	173	85	81	36	106
Cade Povich	3	8	5.21	22	20	0	112.1	125	70	65	43	118
Trevor Rogers	9	3	1.81	18	18	0	109.2	70	23	22	29	103
Charlie Morton	7	8	5.42	23	17	0	101.1	110	63	61	48	101
Zach Eflin	6	5	5.93	14	14	0	71.1	88	48	47	13	50
Keegan Akin	5	4	3.41	64	3	8	63.1	54	28	24	33	59
Yennier Canó	3	7	5.12	65	0	2	58.0	62	36	33	24	53
Brandon Young	1	7	6.24	12	12	0	57.2	67	42	40	22	47
Seranthony Domínguez	2	3	3.24	43	0	2	41.2	32	19	15	24	54
Bryan Baker	3	2	3.52	42	0	2	38.1	33	17	15	9	49
Gregory Soto	0	2	3.96	45	0	1	36.1	29	17	16	18	44
Félix Bautista	1	1	2.60	35	0	19	34.2	16	10	10	23	50
Kyle Bradish	1	1	2.53	6	6	0	32.0	23	9	9	10	47
Andrew Kittredge	2	2	3.45	31	0	0	31.1	26	13	12	8	32
Dietrich Enns	2	2	3.14	17	1	2	28.2	27	13	10	11	34
Grant Wolfram	3	1	5.40	21	0	0	26.2	35	20	16	15	31
Kade Strowd	0	1	1.71	25	0	0	26.1	16	6	5	13	24
Matt Bowman	0	1	6.20	20	0	0	24.2	31	18	17	6	18
Scott Blewett	1	0	6.17	13	1	0	23.1	25	17	16	8	17
Tyler Wells	2	1	2.91	4	4	0	21.2	17	7	7	2	18
Cionel Pérez	0	0	8.31	19	0	0	21.2	28	22	20	18	21
Yaramil Hiraldo	0	0	4.58	18	0	0	19.2	17	13	10	9	21
Rico Garcia	0	2	2.84	20	1	0	19.0	21	6	6	6	20
Corbin Martin	1	0	6.00	17	0	2	18.0	22	15	12	9	23
Colin Selby	0	2	3.21	11	0	0	14.0	16	5	5	2	14
Kyle Gibson	0	3	16.78	4	4	0	12.1	29	23	23	7	10
Albert Suárez	2	0	2.31	5	1	0	11.2	9	4	3	2	10
Chayce McDermott	0	1	15.58	4	1	0	8.2	12	15	15	12	9
Shawn Dubin	0	0	3.38	7	0	0	8.0	7	3	3	3	7
José Castillo	0	0	2.45	5	0	0	7.1	6	3	2	3	7
Carson Ragsdale	0	0	14.40	2	0	0	5.0	10	8	8	1	4
Roansy Contreras	0	0	0.00	1	0	0	4.1	3	0	0	1	2
Luis Vázquez	0	0	0.00	4	0	0	4.1	3	0	0	1	0
José Espada	0	0	0.00	1	0	0	3.0	1	0	0	0	4
Cody Poteet	0	0	16.88	1	0	0	2.2	6	5	5	2	1
Jorge Mateo	0	0	45.00	1	0	0	1.0	5	5	5	2	0
Alex Johnson	0	0	27.00	1	0	0	1.0	3	3	3	2	0
Emmanuel Rivera	0	0	72.00	1	0	0	1.0	8	8	8	2	0
Gary Sánchez	0	0	36.00	1	0	0	1.0	2	4	4	1	0
Elvin Rodríguez	0	0	18.00	1	0	0	1.0	3	2	2	0	1
Totals	75	87	4.62	162	162	38	1432.2	1433	788	735	523	1351

Source:Baseball Reference

== Farm system ==
Level	Team	League	Manager
Triple-A	Norfolk Tides	International League	Tim Federowicz
Double-A	Chesapeake Baysox	Eastern League	Roberto Mercado
High-A	Aberdeen IronBirds	South Atlantic League	Ryan Goll
Low-A	Delmarva Shorebirds	Carolina League	Collin Woody
Rookie	FCL Orioles	Florida Complex League	Christian Frias
Foreign Rookie	DSL Orioles 1	Dominican Summer League	Chris Madera
Foreign Rookie	DSL Orioles 2	Dominican Summer League	Elbis Morel
