= Buck Britton =

American baseball player and coach (born 1986)

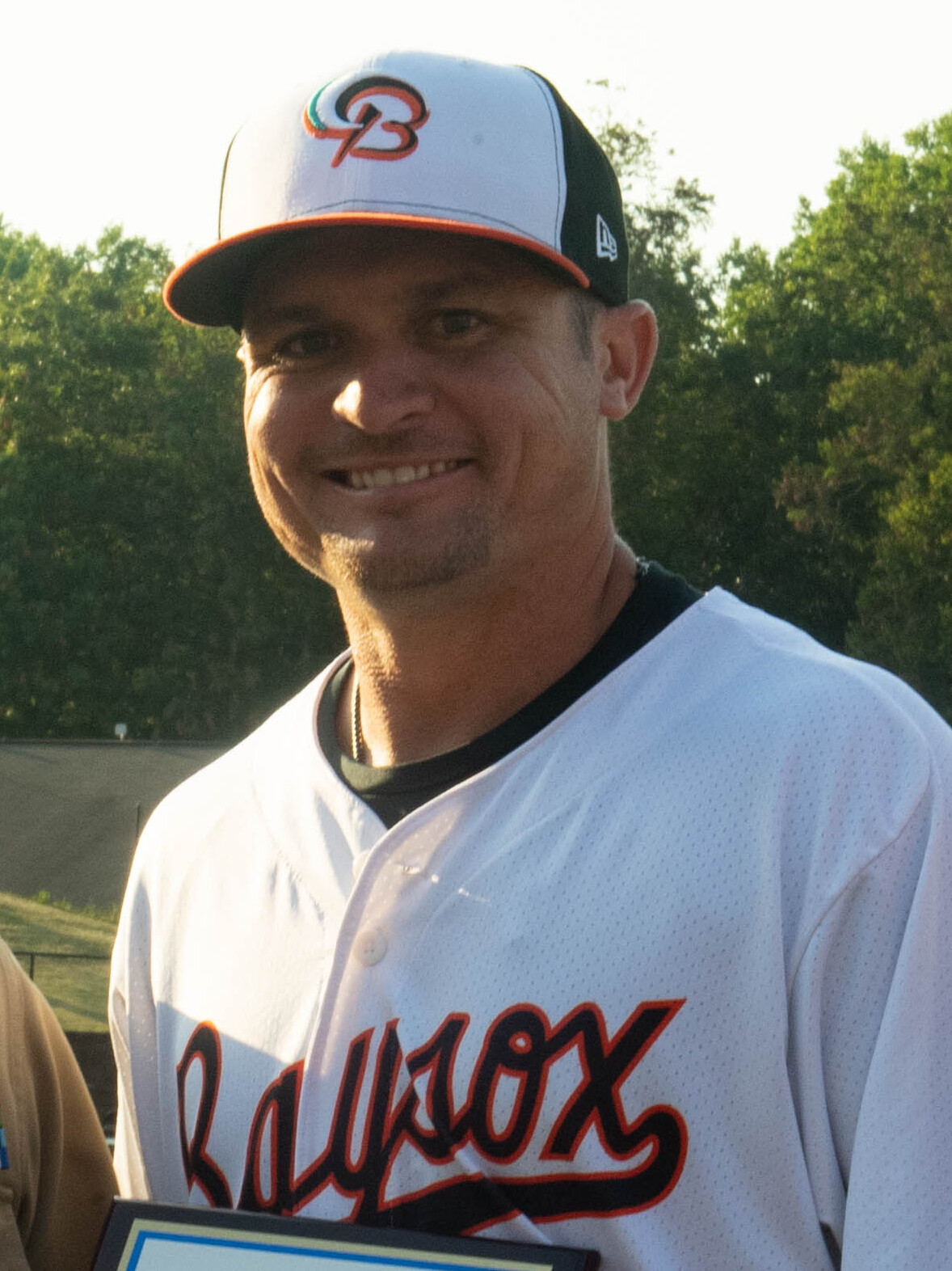
- Britton with the Bowie Baysox in 2021

Baltimore Orioles – No. 46
- Coach
- Born: May 16, 1986 (age 39); Los Angeles, California, U.S.
- Bats: Left Throws: Right

Teams
- Baltimore Orioles (2025–present)

Buchanan Clyde Britton (born May 16, 1986) is an American professional baseball coach who currently serves as the third base coach for the Baltimore Orioles of Major League Baseball (MLB). He is the older brother of former Orioles closer Zack Britton.

== Early years ==
Britton attended Canyon High School before transferring to Weatherford High School where he graduated in 2004. He matriculated at Lon Morris College and Stephen F. Austin State University for a year each before graduating from Lubbock Christian University in 2008. He was a second baseman and leadoff hitter who started in all 111 games in his two seasons with the Chaparrals. He had a combined .383 batting average with 164 hits, 18 home runs, 7 triples and 99 runs batted in (RBI). He was a National Association of Intercollegiate Athletics (NAIA) All-American in his junior year.

== Professional playing career ==
=== Baltimore Orioles ===
Britton was the 1,046th overall selection in the 35th round by the Baltimore Orioles in the 2008 Major League Baseball draft. He made his professional debut with the rookie-level Bluefield Orioles.

Britton split the 2009 season between the Low-A Aberdeen IronBirds, Single-A Delmarva Shorebirds, High-A Frederick Keys, and Double-A Bowie Baysox; in 34 appearances for the four affiliates, he batted a combined .257/.297/.343 with one home run, eight RBI, and three stolen bases. In 2010, he made 104 appearances split between Frederick and the Triple-A Norfolk Tides, slashing .253/.306/.352 with five home runs, 48 RBI, and three stolen bases.

Britton split the 2011 season between Frederick and Bowie, posting a .297/.354/.445 batting line with six home runs, 63 RBI, and six stolen bases across 107 total appearances. He spent the 2012 season primarily with Bowie, also making three late-season appearances for Norfolk; in 99 games for the Baysox, he hit .289/.351/.424 with nine home runs, 54 RBI, and five stolen bases.

In 2013, Britton made 123 appearances for Bowie and Norfolk, slashing a combined .274/.327/.418 with 13 home runs, 79 RBI, and six stolen bases. He split the 2014 campaign with Bowie and Norfolk, batting .289/.345/.453 with 15 home runs and 67 RBI.

=== Los Angeles Dodgers ===
On November 22, 2014, Britton signed a minor league contract with the Los Angeles Dodgers organization. He made 117 appearances for the Triple-A Oklahoma City Dodgers in 2015, slashing .262/.311/.374 with seven home runs, 49 RBI, and 11 stolen bases. Britton elected free agency following the season on November 6, 2015.

=== Minnesota Twins ===
On December 9, 2015, Britton signed a minor league contract with the Minnesota Twins. He made 73 appearances for the Triple-A Rochester Red Wings in 2016, slashing .194/.240/.289 with three home runs and 25 RBI. Britton was released by the Twins organization on August 9, 2016.

Britton ended a professional playing career spent entirely in the minor leagues with a .270 batting average, 59 home runs, 407 RBI and a .721 on-base plus slugging (OPS).

== Managerial/coaching career ==
Britton returned to the Orioles organization to succeed Kyle Moore as hitting coach with the Delmarva Shorebirds in 2017. He replaced Ryan Minor as Shorebirds manager one year later on January 25, 2018. The Shorebirds finished with a 68–66 record in his only season as its skipper.

Britton was promoted to succeed Gary Kendall in a similar capacity with the Bowie Baysox in early-February 2019. The ballclub went 149–111 in the two seasons he managed the team, both of which ended with appearances in the Eastern League Championship Series. The Baysox lost to the Trenton Thunder 3–1 in 2019 and the Akron RubberDucks 3–0 in 2021. He coached at the Orioles Alternate Training Site at Prince George's Stadium in the intermediate year when the 2020 Minor League Baseball campaign was cancelled due to the COVID-19 pandemic.

Britton was elevated to manage the Norfolk Tides on January 26, 2022. His record in three years with the ballclub was 233–216. Despite sub-.500 campaigns at 74–76 and 69–81 in 2022 and 2024 respectively, the Tides captured both the International League and Triple-A National Championships in 2023. He received that season's International League Manager of the Year Award on October 4, 2023.

On November 25, 2024, Britton was promoted to Baltimore's major league coaching staff under the role of major league coach. Following the firing of Brandon Hyde on May 17, 2025, Tony Mansolino was named interim manager, and Britton took over Mansolino's role as third base coach. On November 17, the Orioles announced that Britton would remain on their staff in the same role, shedding his interim title.
