= Cooper Hummel =

American baseball player (born 1994)

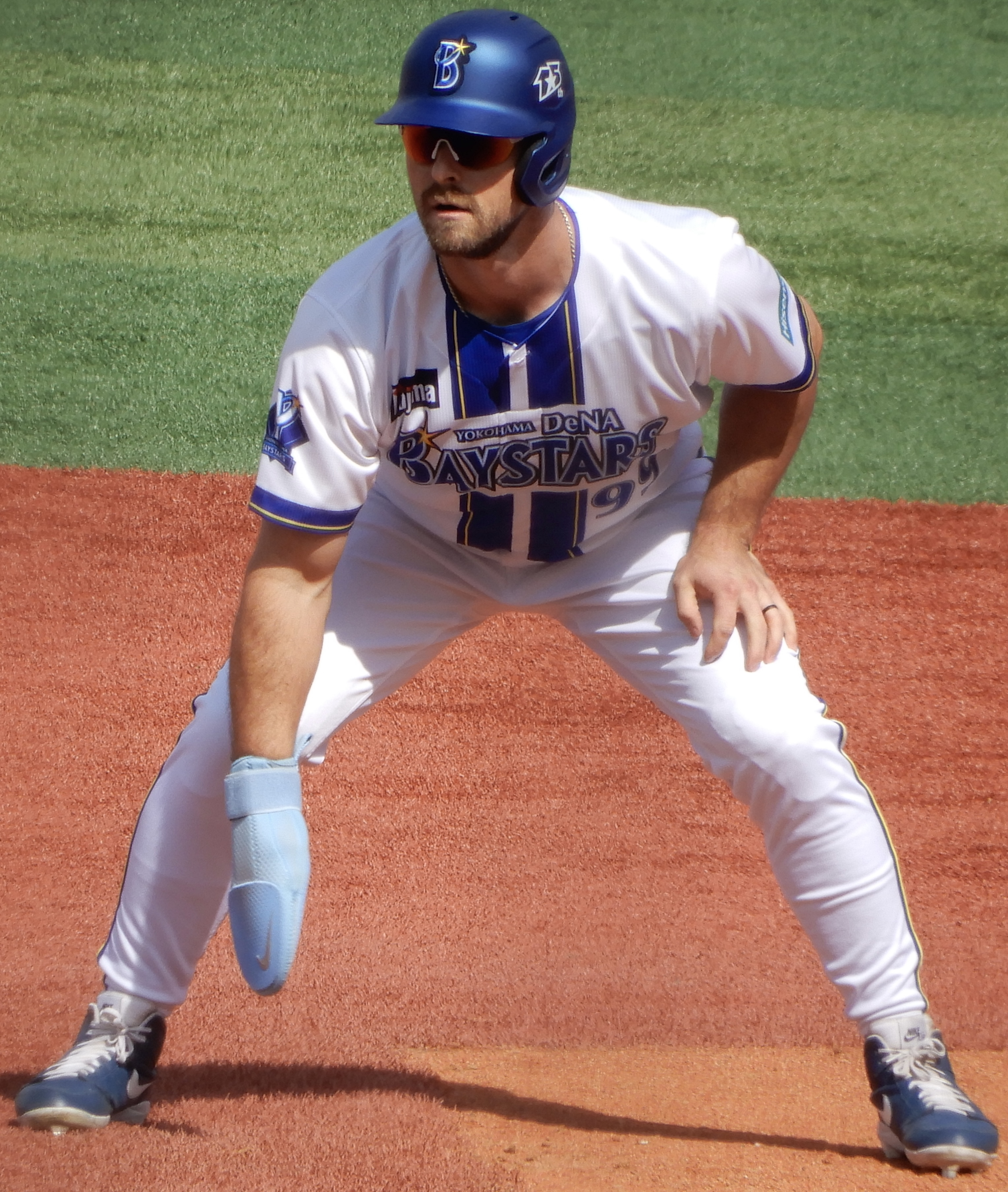
- Hummel with the Yokohama DeNA BayStars in 2026

Yokohama DeNA BayStars – No. 99
- Catcher / Outfielder
- Born: November 28, 1994 (age 31); Portland, Oregon, U.S.
- Bats: Switch Throws: Right

Professional debut
- MLB: April 7, 2022, for the Arizona Diamondbacks
- NPB: March 27, 2026, for the Yokohama DeNA BayStars

MLB statistics (through 2025 season)
- Batting average: .163
- Home runs: 6
- Runs batted in: 24

NPB statistics (through August 18, 2026)
- Batting average: .209
- Home runs: 5
- Runs batted in: 18
- Stats at Baseball Reference

Teams
- Arizona Diamondbacks (2022); Seattle Mariners (2023); Houston Astros (2024); Baltimore Orioles (2025); Houston Astros (2025); Yokohama DeNA BayStars (2026–present)

Cooper Everett Hummel (born November 28, 1994) is an American professional baseball outfielder and catcher for the Yokohama DeNA BayStars of Nippon Professional Baseball (NPB). He has previously played in Major League Baseball (MLB) for the Arizona Diamondbacks, Seattle Mariners, Houston Astros, and Baltimore Orioles. Hummel played college baseball at the University of Portland.

== Early life ==
Hummel attended Lakeridge High School in Lake Oswego, Oregon. He was a member of the Lake Oswego Little League team that advanced to the U.S. semifinals of the 2007 Little League World Series. He attended the University of Portland and played college baseball for the Portland Pilots for three seasons.

== Professional career ==
=== Milwaukee Brewers ===
The Milwaukee Brewers selected Hummel in the 18th round of the 2016 Major League Baseball draft. Hummel made his professional debut with the rookie-level Helena Brewers. In 2017, Hummel played for the High-A Carolina Mudcats, slashing .244/.368/.381 in 59 games. He returned to Carolina the following year and posted a slash of .260/.397/.410 with 8 home runs and 50 RBI in 103 games. In 2019, Hummel played in 121 games for the Double-A Biloxi Shuckers, hitting .249/.384/.450 with career-highs in home runs (17) and RBI (56). Hummel did not play in a game in 2020 due to the cancellation of the minor league season because of the COVID-19 pandemic. Hummel was assigned to the Triple-A Nashville Sounds to begin the 2021 season, and hit .254/.435/.508 with 6 home runs and 15 RBI.

=== Arizona Diamondbacks ===
On July 28, 2021, the Brewers traded Hummel and Alberto Ciprian to the Arizona Diamondbacks in exchange for Eduardo Escobar. Hummel finished the year with the Triple-A Reno Aces, batting .353/.429/.575 with 6 home runs and 37 RBI in 46 games. On November 19, 2021, the Diamondbacks added Hummel to their 40-man roster to protect him from the Rule 5 draft.

Hummel made his MLB debut on Opening Day on April 7, 2022, as a pinch hitter for Jake McCarthy. In an April 10 game against the San Diego Padres, he recorded his first career hit and home run off of Padres reliever Javy Guerra. In 66 appearances for the Diamondbacks during his rookie campaign, Hummel slashed .176/.274/.307 with three home runs, 17 RBI, and four stolen bases.

=== Seattle Mariners ===
On November 17, 2022, the Diamondbacks traded Hummel to the Seattle Mariners in exchange for Kyle Lewis. He spent the majority of the season with the Triple–A Tacoma Rainiers, hitting .262/.409/.435 with 8 home runs, 47 RBI, and 26 stolen bases. In 10 games for Seattle, Hummel went 2–for–23 (.087) with no home runs or RBI.

=== Houston Astros ===
On December 1, 2023, Hummel was claimed off waivers by the New York Mets, who then designated him for assignment on January 12, 2024. On January 16, Hummel was traded to the San Francisco Giants in exchange for cash considerations. Hummel was optioned to the Triple-A Sacramento River Cats to begin the 2024 season. However, on March 28, Hummel was designated for assignment following multiple roster moves.

On April 4, Hummel was claimed off waivers by the Houston Astros. He was designated for assignment by the Astros on April 10, following the promotion of Spencer Arrighetti. On April 14, Hummel cleared waivers and was sent outright to the Triple–A Sugar Land Space Cowboys. In 45 games for Sugar Land, he hit .301/.423/.509 with seven home runs, 31 RBI, and eight stolen bases. On June 14, the Astros selected Hummel's contract, adding him to their active roster. In six games for Houston, he went 0-for-8 with one stolen base.

Hummel was designated for assignment by the Astros on March 27, 2025. He cleared waivers and elected free agency on April 3.

=== New York Yankees ===
On April 7, 2025, Hummel signed a minor league contract with the New York Yankees. In 10 appearances for the Triple-A Scranton/Wilkes-Barre RailRiders, he hit .258/.415/.290 with two RBI and one stolen base. After triggering a release clause in his contract, Hummel was granted his release from the organization on May 24.

=== Baltimore Orioles ===
On May 25, 2025, Hummel signed a major league contract with the Baltimore Orioles. He was designated for assignment following the promotion of Chadwick Tromp the next day. On May 29, Hummel cleared waivers and elected free agency rather than accept an outright assignment to the Triple-A Norfolk Tides. The next day, Hummel re-signed with Baltimore on a new major league contract. He made one appearance for the Orioles, striking out in his only at-bat. On June 2, Hummel was designated for assignment by Baltimore. He cleared waivers and elected free agency on June 5.

=== Houston Astros (second stint) ===
On June 6, 2025, Hummel signed a minor league contract with the Houston Astros. In six appearances for the Triple-A Sugar Land Space Cowboys, he went 7-for-24 (.292) with two home runs and seven RBI. On June 14, the Astros selected Hummel's contract, adding him to their active roster. In 36 appearances for Houston, he slashed .172/.301/.276 with three home runs, seven RBI, and one stolen base. Hummel was designated for assignment by the Astros on August 11. He elected free agency after clearing waivers on August 15.

=== Tampa Bay Rays ===
On August 17, 2025, Hummel signed a minor league contract with the Tampa Bay Rays organization. He made 28 appearances for the Triple-A Durham Bulls, batting .312/.471/.731 with 11 home runs and 26 RBI. Hummel elected free agency following the season on November 6.

=== Yokohama DeNA BayStars ===
On December 8, 2025, Hummel signed with the Yokohama DeNA BayStars of Nippon Professional Baseball.

== Personal life ==
Hummel and his wife Ashley married in 2021.
