= Dylan Beavers =

American baseball player (born 2001)

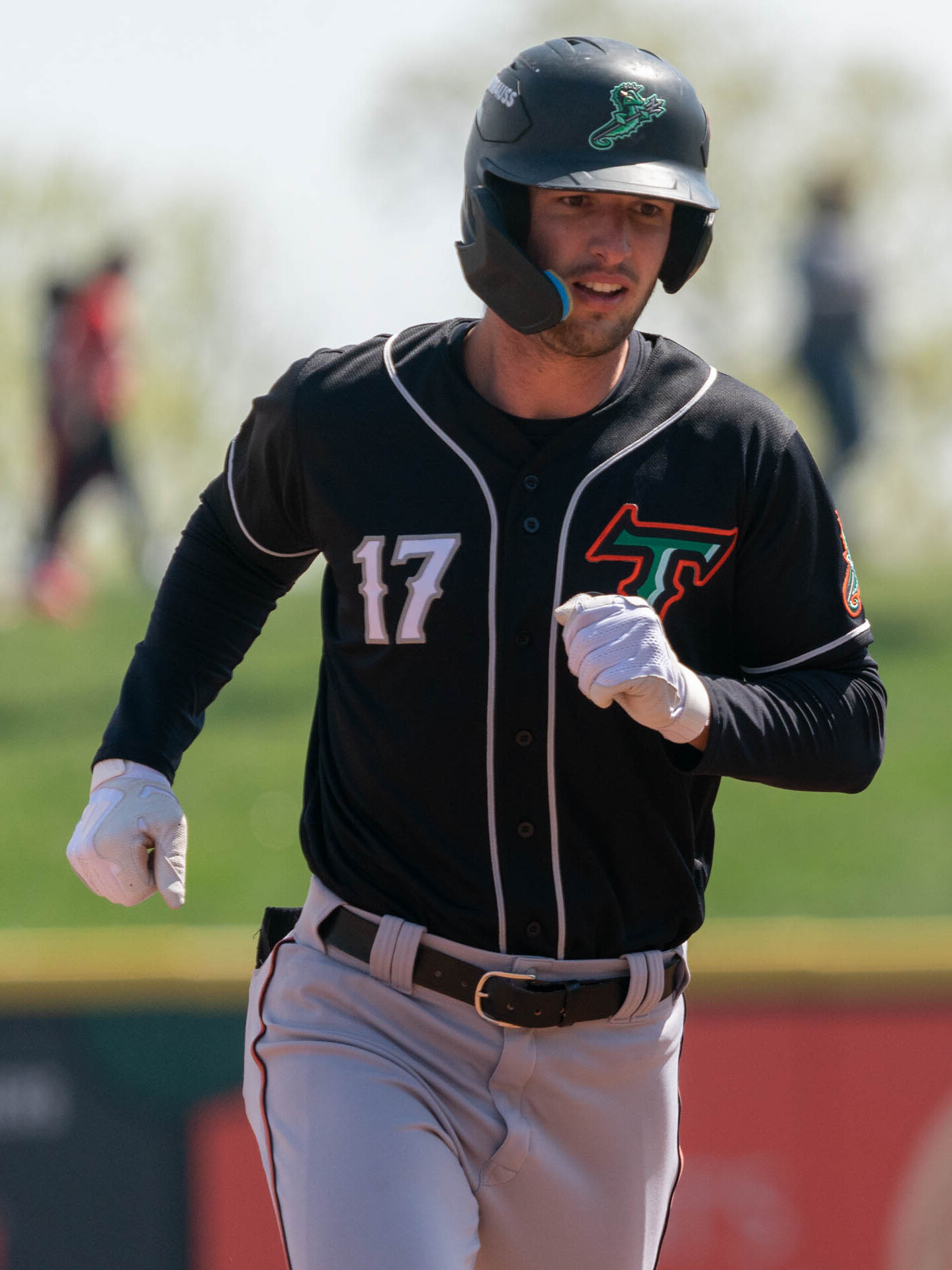
- Beavers with the Norfolk Tides in 2025

Baltimore Orioles – No. 12
- Outfielder
- Born: August 11, 2001 (age 25); San Luis Obispo, California, U.S.
- Bats: Left Throws: Right

MLB debut
- August 16, 2025, for the Baltimore Orioles

MLB statistics (through 2026 season)
- Batting average: .228
- Home runs: 13
- Runs batted in: 58
- Stats at Baseball Reference

Teams
- Baltimore Orioles (2025–present)

Dylan Matthew Beavers (born August 11, 2001) is an American professional baseball outfielder for the Baltimore Orioles of Major League Baseball (MLB). He played college baseball for the California Golden Bears. He made his MLB debut in 2025.

== Amateur career ==
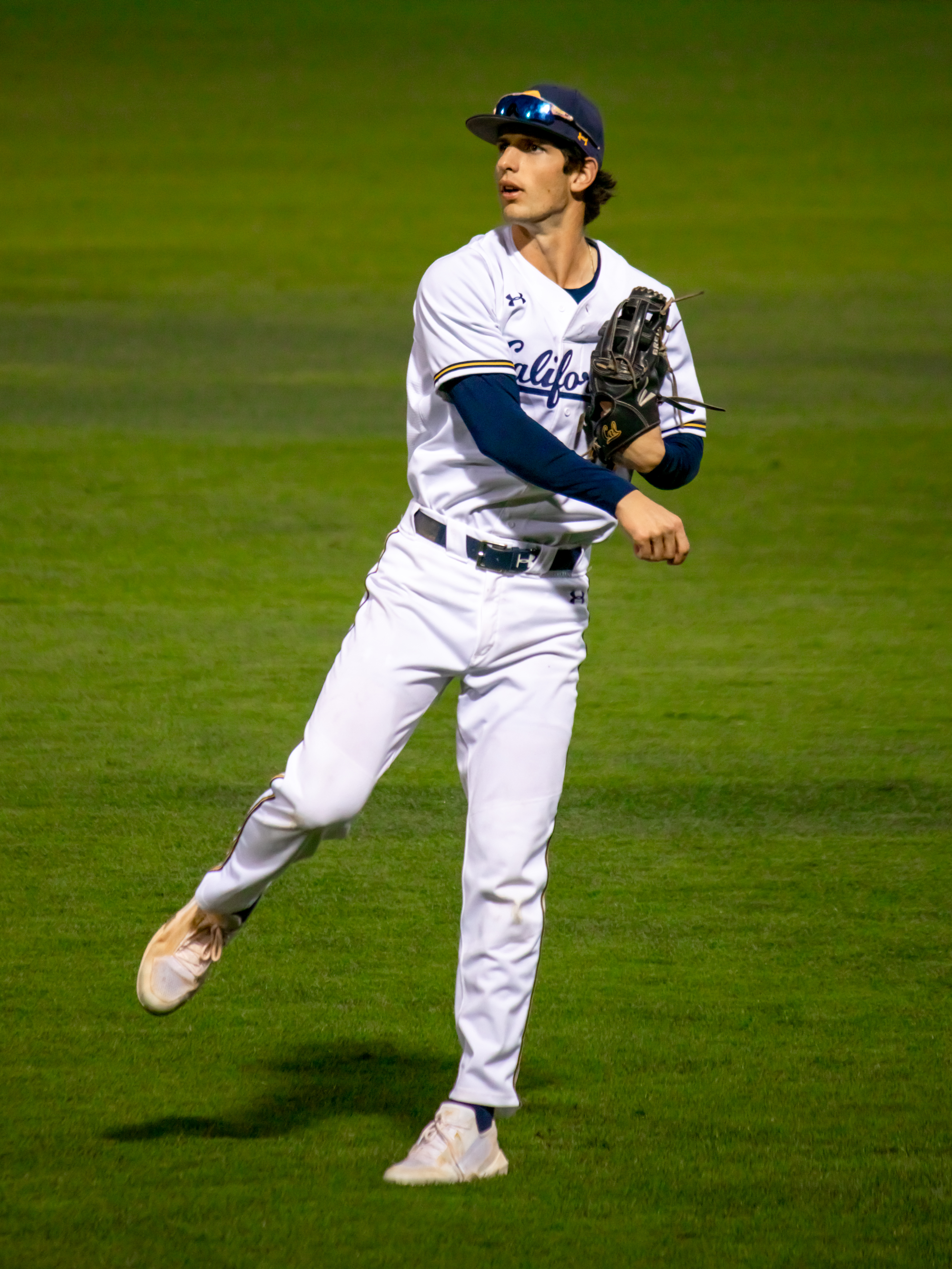
Beavers with Cal in 2022

Beavers grew up in Paso Robles, California and attended Mission College Preparatory High School. He committed to play college baseball at the University of California, Berkeley at the beginning of his junior year of high school. As a senior, Beavers batted .529 with 10 doubles, 6 triples, 12 home runs, and 36 runs batted in (RBIs) with 46 runs scored and 25 stolen bases.

Beavers enrolled at UC Berkeley to play college baseball for the California Golden Bears. He batted .250 with one home run through 12 games during his true freshman season before it was cut short due to the coronavirus pandemic. After his sophomore season, he was named first team All-Pac-12 Conference after batting .303 with 11 doubles, two triples, 18 home runs and 49 RBIs. After the 2021 season, he played collegiate summer baseball for the Cotuit Kettleers of the Cape Cod Baseball League. Beavers was also selected to play for the Team USA Collegiate National Baseball Team. He was named a preseason All-American by several outlets going into his junior season. Beavers repeated as a first team All-Pac-12 selection after batting .291 with 17 home runs and 50 RBIs.

== Professional career ==
Beavers was selected with the 33rd overall pick by the Baltimore Orioles in the Competitive Balance Round A of the 2022 Major League Baseball draft. He signed with the Orioles on July 23, 2022, and received a $2.2 million signing bonus. Beavers spent his first professional season with the rookie–level Florida Complex League Orioles, Single–A Delmarva Shorebirds, and High–A Aberdeen IronBirds. He split the 2023 campaign between Aberdeen and the Double–A Bowie Baysox, slashing a combined .288/.383/.467 with 11 home runs, 60 RBI, and 27 stolen bases over 119 games.

Beavers began the 2024 campaign with Double–A Bowie, playing in 119 games and slashing .241/.343/.413 with 15 home runs, 50 RBI, and 31 stolen bases. On September 16, 2024, Beavers was promoted to the Triple–A Norfolk Tides.

To begin the 2025 season, Beavers was assigned to Triple-A Norfolk. In 94 games for Norfolk, he slashed .304/.420/.515 with 18 home runs, 51 RBI, and 23 stolen bases. After the season, he won the International League Most Valuable Player Award.

On August 16, 2025, Beavers was selected to the 40-man roster and promoted to the major leagues for the first time. His first MLB hit was a leadoff double off Bryan Abreu in the ninth inning of an Orioles' 12-inning 5–4 away loss to the Houston Astros later that night. On August 21, Beavers hit the first home run of his MLB career in his first plate appearance at Camden Yards, off Houston Astros pitcher Jason Alexander. He was only the third player in Orioles history to hit his first MLB homer in his first home plate appearance. He then bookended this performance on September 25, in his last plate appearance in Camden Yards in 2025, by hitting a walk-off home run off Kevin Kelly in the bottom of the ninth inning of a 6–5 win over the Tampa Bay Rays. It was the Orioles' last home game of the season.
