= Samuel Basallo =

Dominican baseball player (born 2004)

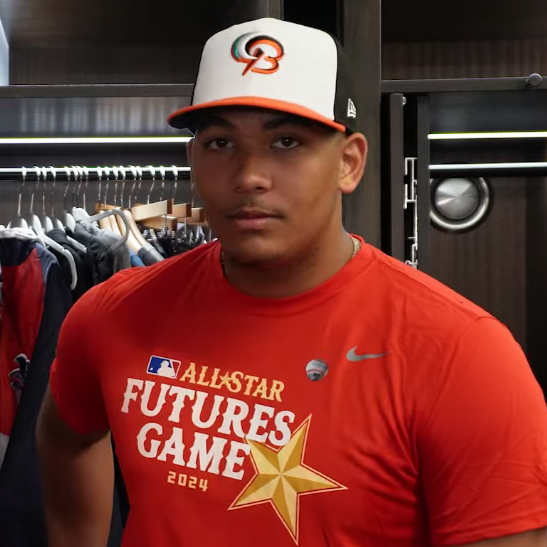
- Basallo at the 2024 All-Star Futures Game

Baltimore Orioles – No. 29
- Catcher / First baseman
- Born: August 13, 2004 (age 22); Santo Domingo, Dominican Republic
- Bats: Left Throws: Right

MLB debut
- August 17, 2025, for the Baltimore Orioles

MLB statistics (through 2026 season)
- Batting average: .209
- Home runs: 22
- Runs batted in: 69
- Stats at Baseball Reference

Teams
- Baltimore Orioles (2025–present)

Samuel Alexander Basallo (/sɑːmˈwɛl bɑːˈsaɪjoʊ/ sahm-WEL bah-SY-yoh; born August 13, 2004) is a Dominican professional baseball catcher and first baseman for the Baltimore Orioles of Major League Baseball (MLB). He made his MLB debut in 2025.

== Career ==
Basallo signed with the Baltimore Orioles as an international free agent on January 15, 2021. He made his professional debut that year with the Dominican Summer League Orioles.

Basallo played 2022 with the rookie-level Florida Complex League Orioles and started 2023 with the Single-A Delmarva Shorebirds. With Delmarva, he was chosen for the 2023 Carolina League Most Valuable Player Award and Top MLB Prospect Award.

Basallo opened 2024 with the Double-A Bowie Baysox. In 106 games for Bowie, he slashed .289/.355/.465 with 16 home runs, 55 RBIs and nine stolen bases. On August 27, 2024, Basallo was promoted to the triple-A Norfolk Tides.

Basallo returned to Norfolk in 2025, hitting .270/.377/.589 with 23 home runs and 67 RBIs in 76 appearances. On August 17, 2025, Basallo was selected to the 40-man roster and promoted to the major leagues for the first time. His first MLB hit was a two-run single off Enyel De Los Santos in the eighth inning of an Orioles' 12–0 away win over the Houston Astros later that afternoon. His three-run homer attempt in the previous inning was denied by a Jesús Sánchez catch at the right-field wall. On August 22, Basallo and the Orioles agreed to an eight-year, $67 million contract extension. On August 30, he became the youngest catcher in franchise history to hit a home run.

On September 5, 2025, Basallo hit a walk-off home run with two outs and two strikes in the bottom of the ninth inning, leading the Orioles to a 2–1 win against the Los Angeles Dodgers. It was Basallo's first home run at Camden Yards, and the first walk-off home run or hit of his career. He slashed .165/.229/.330 in his first 31 MLB games to conclude the campaign.

On June 22, 2026, Basallo was placed on the injured list for the first time in his career.
