= Emmanuel Rivera =

Puerto Rican baseball player (born 1996)

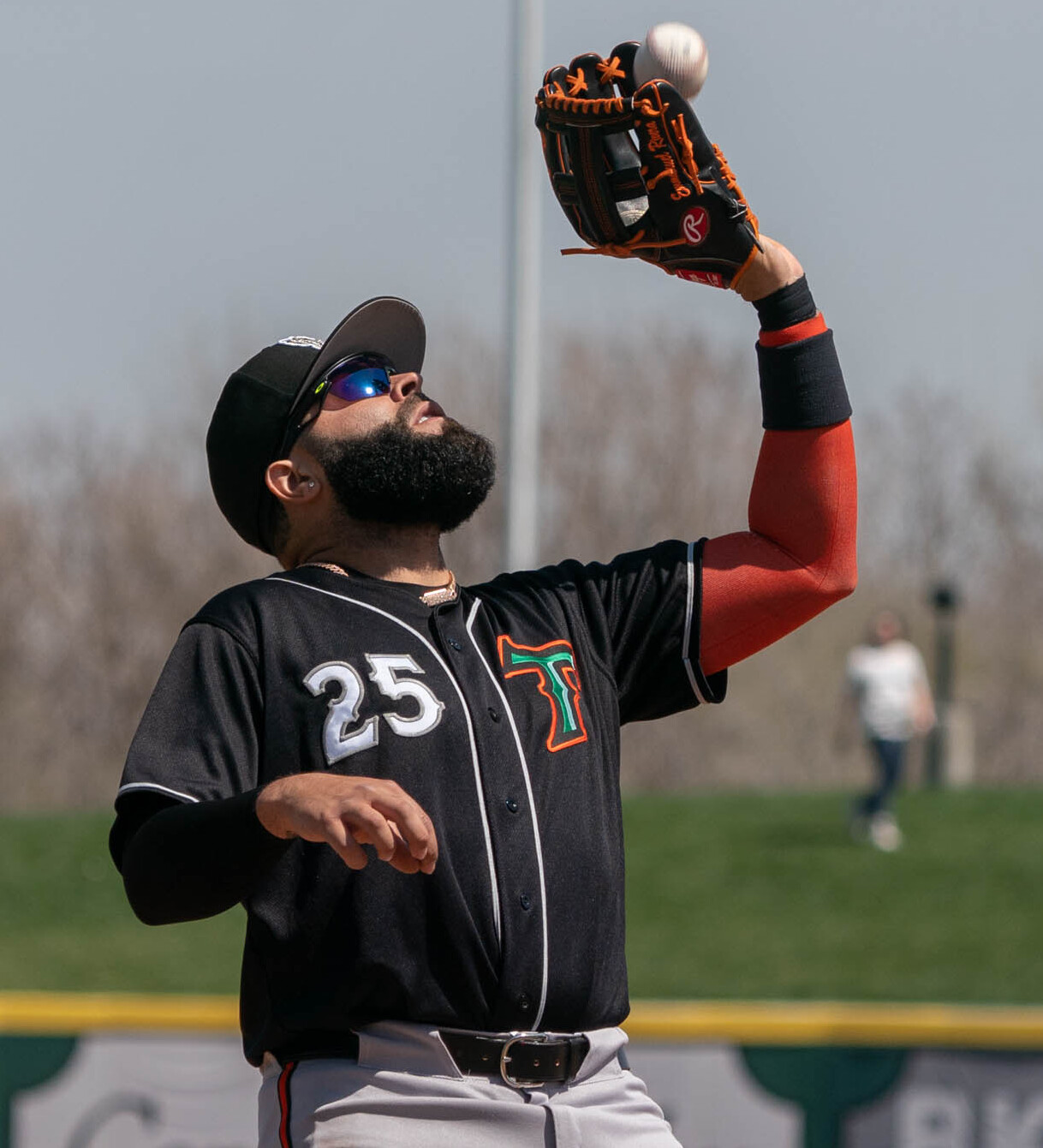
- Rivera with the Norfolk Tides in 2025

Saraperos de Saltillo – No. 10
- Third baseman
- Born: June 29, 1996 (age 30); Mayagüez, Puerto Rico
- Bats: Right Throws: Right

MLB debut
- June 28, 2021, for the Kansas City Royals

MLB statistics (through 2025 season)
- Batting average: .245
- Home runs: 22
- Runs batted in: 116
- Stats at Baseball Reference

Teams
- Kansas City Royals (2021–2022); Arizona Diamondbacks (2022–2023); Miami Marlins (2024); Baltimore Orioles (2024–2025)

Emmanuel Miguel Rivera (born June 29, 1996) is a Puerto Rican professional baseball third baseman for the Saraperos de Saltillo of the Mexican League. He has previously played in Major League Baseball (MLB) for the Kansas City Royals, Arizona Diamondbacks, Miami Marlins, and Baltimore Orioles.

== Professional career ==
=== Kansas City Royals ===
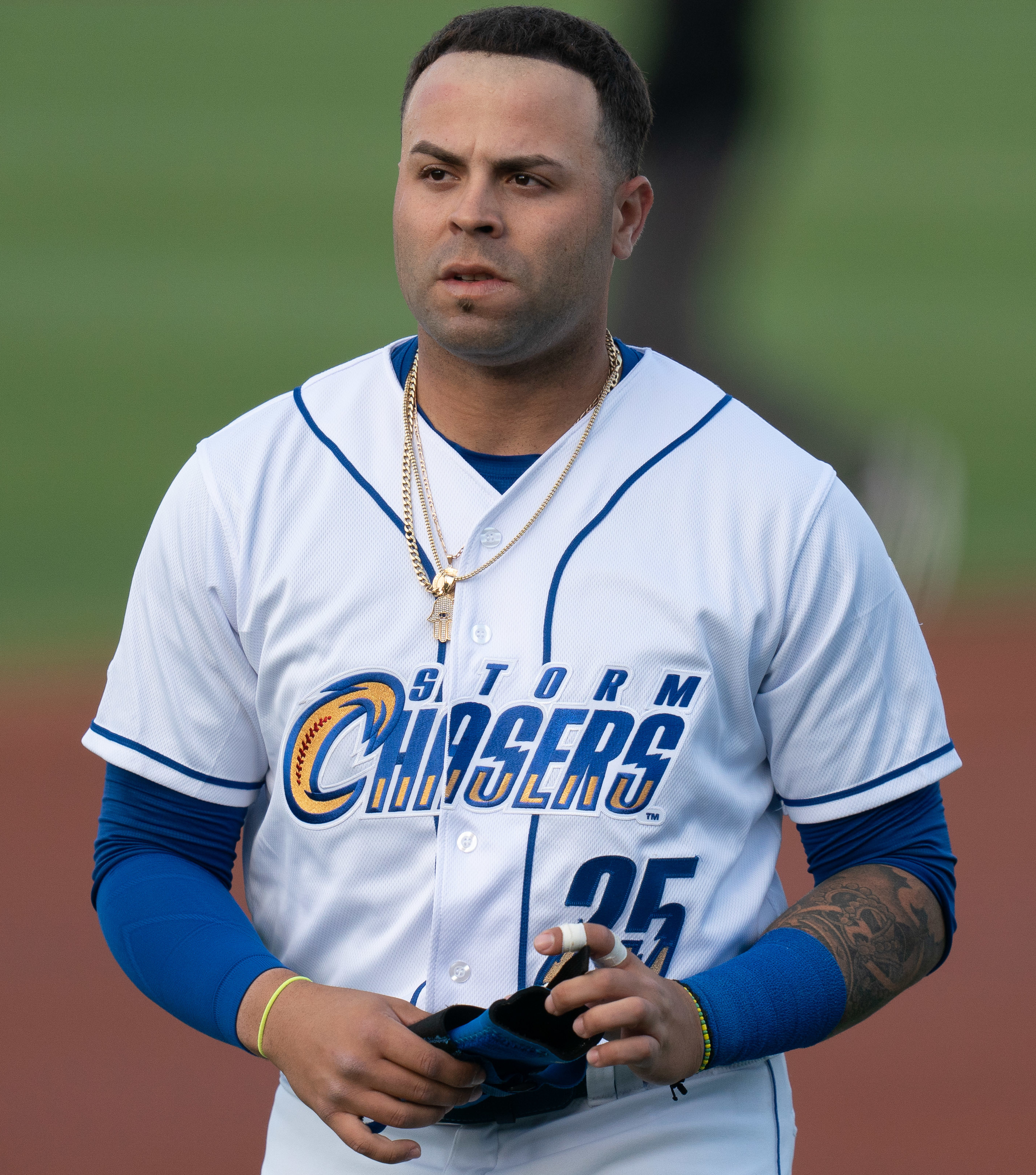
Rivera with the Omaha Storm Chasers in 2021

Rivera was drafted by the Kansas City Royals out of the Interamerican University of Puerto Rico in the 19th round, 579th overall, of the 2015 Major League Baseball draft. He made his professional debut with the rookie-level Arizona League Royals, playing in 38 games with the team.

In 2016, Rivera played for the rookie-level Burlington Royals, posting a .249/.317/.373 slash line in 58 games. The following year, he played for the Single-A Lexington Legends, slashing .310/.364/.468 with 12 home runs and 72 RBI. In 2018, Rivera split the season between the High-A Wilmington Blue Rocks and the AZL Royals, batting a cumulative .274/.326/.416 with 6 home runs and 63 RBI. For the 2019 season, Rivera played for the Double-A Northwest Arkansas Naturals, logging a .258/.297/.345 slash line with 7 home runs and 57 RBI in 131 games.

Rivera did not play in a game in 2020 due to the cancellation of the minor league season because of the COVID-19 pandemic. He was assigned to the Triple-A Omaha Storm Chasers to begin the 2021 season, and batted .282/.337/.593 with a career-high 14 home runs and 40 RBI in 44 games.

On June 28, 2021, Rivera was selected to the 40-man roster and promoted to the major leagues for the first time. He made his MLB debut that day as the starting third baseman against the Boston Red Sox, and logged his first career hit in the game as well, a single off starter Garrett Richards. He was placed on the injured list on June 30 with a left hamate break. In his first MLB season, he played in 29 games for the Royals and hitting .256/.316/.333 with one home run, 5 RBI, and 2 stolen bases. In 2022, Rivera made 63 appearances for Kansas City, slashing .237/.284/.399 with 6 home runs and 22 RBI.

=== Arizona Diamondbacks ===
On August 1, 2022, the Royals traded Rivera to the Arizona Diamondbacks for pitcher Luke Weaver. He played in 39 games for the Diamondbacks down the stretch, hitting .227/.304/.424 with 6 home runs and 18 RBI.

Rivera was optioned to the Triple-A Reno Aces to begin the 2023 season. In 86 games for the Diamondbacks, he batted .261/.314/.358 with four home runs and 29 RBI. He played in 13 postseason games, starting three games in the National League Championship Series (NLCS) and Game 4 of the World Series. His first postseason hit was an RBI single in Game 4 of the NLCS He hit .235/.278/.294 in 18 playoff plate appearances.

On March 28, 2024, Rivera was designated for assignment after failing to make Arizona's Opening Day roster.

=== Miami Marlins ===
On April 2, 2024, Rivera was traded to the Miami Marlins in exchange for cash. In 96 games for Miami, he slashed .214/.294/.269 with one home run and 15 RBI. The Marlins designated Rivera for assignment on August 19.

=== Baltimore Orioles ===
On August 21, 2024, Rivera was claimed off waivers by the Baltimore Orioles. He had a pair of home runs and career-highs with four hits, four RBI, and 11 total bases in a 9–2 away victory over the Minnesota Twins in the penultimate game of the regular season on September 28. In 27 games for Baltimore, Rivera batted .313/.370/.578 with four home runs and 14 RBI. In Game 1 of the Wild Card Series, he grounded out as a pinch hitter.

On January 31, 2025, the Orioles designated Rivera for assignment. He cleared waivers and was sent outright to the Triple-A Norfolk Tides on February 10. After hitting .308 with 13 RBI in 17 games for Norfolk, the Orioles selected Rivera to their active roster on April 28. In 25 appearances for Baltimore, he batted .232/.303/.275 with three RBI and one stolen base. Rivera was designated for assignment by the Orioles on June 10. He cleared waivers and was sent outright to Triple-A Norfolk on June 12. On June 28, the Orioles added Rivera back to their active roster. After one pinch-hit appearance for the team, he was designated for assignment following the promotion of Jacob Stallings on July 1. Rivera was sent outright to Norfolk after clearing waivers on July 4. On August 27, the Orioles again selected Rivera's contract. He equaled his career-high four RBI with a pair of two-out two-run singles in a 6–2 away win over the San Diego Padres on 2 September. Despite batting .280 with 10 RBI over 16 games, Rivera was designated for assignment for a fourth time on September 16. He cleared waivers and was sent outright to Triple-A Norfolk on September 19. Rivera elected free agency on October 6.

=== Algodoneros de Unión Laguna ===
On March 17, 2026, Rivera signed with the Algodoneros de Unión Laguna of the Mexican League. In 63 appearances for the Algodoneros, he batted .263/.345/.404 with six home runs and 31 RBI. On July 10, Rivera was released by Laguna.

=== Saraperos de Saltillo ===
On July 12, 2026, Rivera signed with the Saraperos de Saltillo of the Mexican League.

== International career ==
Rivera played for Puerto Rico in the 2023 World Baseball Classic. He batted .278 with 1 triple and 5 RBI in five games.

== Personal life ==
Like his father Miguel, an amateur baseball player in Puerto Rico, Rivera is nicknamed "El Pulpo" (The Octopus) because of his defense.
