= Carson Ragsdale =

American baseball player (born 1998)

Free agent
- Pitcher
- Born: May 25, 1998 (age 28); Wesley Chapel, Florida, U.S.
- Bats: Right Throws: Right

MLB debut
- September 14, 2025, for the Baltimore Orioles

MLB statistics (through 2025 season)
- Win–loss record: 0–0
- Earned run average: 14.40
- Strikeouts: 4
- Stats at Baseball Reference

Teams
- Baltimore Orioles (2025)

Carson Andrew Ragsdale (born May 25, 1998) is an American professional baseball pitcher who is a free agent. He has previously played in Major League Baseball (MLB) for the Baltimore Orioles.

== Career ==
=== Philadelphia Phillies ===
Ragsdale was drafted by the Philadelphia Phillies in the 4th round, with the 116th overall selection, of the 2020 Major League Baseball draft. He did not play in a game in 2020 due to the cancellation of the minor league season because of the COVID-19 pandemic.

=== San Francisco Giants ===
On January 9, 2021, Ragsdale was traded to the San Francisco Giants in exchange for Sam Coonrod. He made his professional debut in 2021 with the Single–A San Jose Giants. In 24 starts for San Jose, Ragsdale compiled an 8–6 record and 4.43 ERA with 167 strikeouts across 113 2/3 innings pitched.

Ragsdale began 2022 with the rookie–level Arizona Complex League Giants, striking out nine over five scoreless appearances. He later underwent surgery for thoracic outlet syndrome and missed the remainder of the season. Ragsdale began 2023 with the High–A Eugene Emeralds, recording a 2.93 ERA with 42 strikeouts across 7 starts. However, he suffered a right elbow injury and did not appear in a game after May 13.

Ragsdale split the 2024 campaign between the Double–A Richmond Flying Squirrels and Triple–A Sacramento River Cats, compiling a 5–7 record and 4.18 ERA with 147 strikeouts across 120 2/3 innings pitched. Following the season, the Giants added Ragsdale to their 40-man roster to protect him from the Rule 5 draft.

Ragsdale was optioned to Triple-A Sacramento to begin the 2025 season, where he posted a 5-5 record and 5.37 ERA with 58 strikeouts across 18 games (14 starts). Ragsdale was designated for assignment by San Francisco on July 28, 2025.

=== Baltimore Orioles ===
On August 3, 2025, Ragsdale was claimed off waivers by the Baltimore Orioles. In seven appearances (five starts) for the Triple-A Norfolk Tides, he posted a 2-2 record and 3.47 ERA with 18 strikeouts across 23 1/3 innings pitched. On September 14, the Orioles promoted Ragsdale to the major leagues for the first time. He made his MLB debut the same day, coming into the game as a reliever and giving up eight runs over three innings in an 11-2 loss to the Toronto Blue Jays. Ragsdale was designated for assignment by the Orioles on September 15.

=== Atlanta Braves ===
On September 17, 2025, Ragsdale was claimed off waivers by the Atlanta Braves. He made one appearance for the Triple-A Gwinnett Stripers, but took the loss after allowing four runs on three hits with one strikeout in one inning. Ragsdale was designated for assignment by the Braves on September 22.

=== Baltimore Orioles (second stint) ===
On September 25, 2025, Ragsdale was claimed off waivers by the Baltimore Orioles. In one appearance for Baltimore, he allowed no runs over two innings pitched against the New York Yankees. Ragsdale was designated for assignment by the Orioles on November 6.

On November 13, 2025, Ragsdale was claimed off waivers by the Atlanta Braves. On November 21, he was non-tendered by Atlanta and became a free agent.

=== Hanshin Tigers ===
On December 26, 2025, Ragsdale signed a one-year contract with the Hanshin Tigers of Nippon Professional Baseball. He did not make an appearance with the major league club and became a free agent following the season.
