= Brandon Hyde =

American baseball player & manager (born 1973)

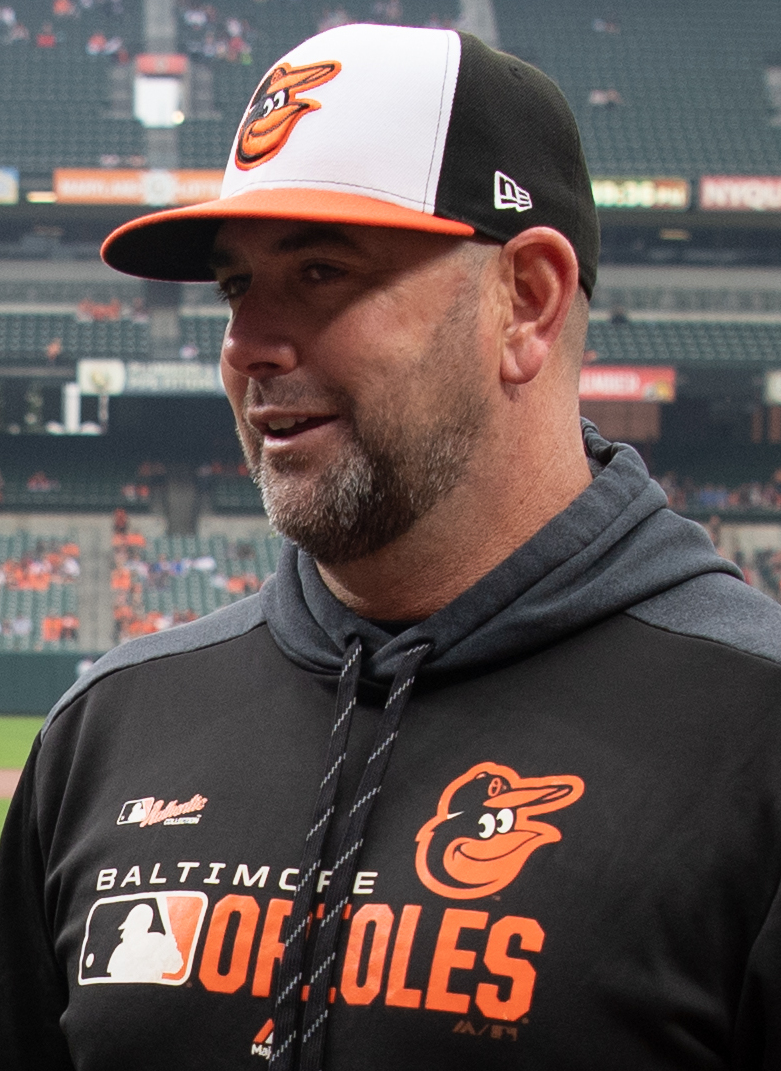
- Hyde with the Orioles in 2019

Tampa Bay Rays
- Catcher / First baseman / Coach / Manager
- Born: October 3, 1973 (age 53); Santa Rosa, California, U.S.
- Bats: Right Throws: Right

MLB statistics
- Managerial record: 421–493
- Winning %: .461
- Stats at Baseball Reference
- Managerial record at Baseball Reference

Teams
- As manager: Florida Marlins (2011); Baltimore Orioles (2019–2025); As coach: Florida Marlins (2010–2011); Chicago Cubs (2014–2018)

Career highlights and awards
- World Series champion (2016); AL Manager of the Year (2023)

Brandon Michael Hyde (born October 3, 1973) is an American professional baseball manager who currently serves as a senior advisor to the baseball operations department for the Tampa Bay Rays of Major League Baseball (MLB). He has previously served as the bench coach, director of player development, and first base coach for the Chicago Cubs, as the bench coach for the Florida Marlins, and as the manager for the Baltimore Orioles.

== Playing career ==
Hyde graduated from Montgomery High School in Santa Rosa, California, in 1992. He attended Santa Rosa Junior College and California State University, Long Beach, and played college baseball for the Long Beach State Dirtbags.

Hyde signed with the Chicago White Sox as an undrafted free agent in 1997. He played in the White Sox organization through 2000, reaching the Charlotte Knights of the Class AAA International League. In 2001, he played for the Chico Heat of the Western Baseball League, an independent baseball league. Over the course of his minor league career, he played in 200 games and hit .252 with 15 home runs.

== Post-playing career ==
=== Florida Marlins ===
Hyde managed in the Marlins organization from 2005 to 2009, heading the Greensboro Grasshoppers in 2005 and 2006, the Carolina Mudcats in 2007, the Jupiter Hammerheads in 2008 and the Jacksonville Suns in 2009 where he led the Suns to their fourth Southern League Championship in club history. He had also spent two years as the Grasshoppers' hitting coach. In 2010, he was the Marlins minor league infield coordinator.

On June 23, 2010, the Marlins fired manager Fredi González, bench coach Carlos Tosca, and hitting coach Jim Presley. Hyde was named the interim bench coach, Edwin Rodríguez was named the interim manager, and John Mallee was named the hitting coach. On November 3, 2010, the Marlins removed the interim tags from each, and made Hyde their bench coach for the 2011 season.

When Rodríguez unexpectedly resigned on June 19, 2011, Hyde was named acting manager for that evening's game against the Tampa Bay Rays (a 2–1 loss that brought the team's losing streak to ten games). On June 20, Jack McKeon was named interim manager and Hyde moved back to the bench coach position.

=== Chicago Cubs ===
On November 22, 2013, Hyde was named bench coach of the Chicago Cubs, under new manager Rick Renteria. The Cubs made a managerial change prior to the 2015 season, firing Renteria and hiring Joe Maddon. Maddon brought Dave Martinez to the Cubs from the Tampa Bay Rays to be his bench coach, and moved Hyde to first base coach. During the 2017–18 off-season, Hyde rejected an offer by the New York Mets to join their coaching staff and remained with the Cubs after they promoted him to bench coach; Martinez had been hired as the Washington Nationals' manager.

On June 23, 2018, Hyde was ejected in the fourth inning against the Cincinnati Reds. This was the first ejection of his career.

=== Baltimore Orioles ===
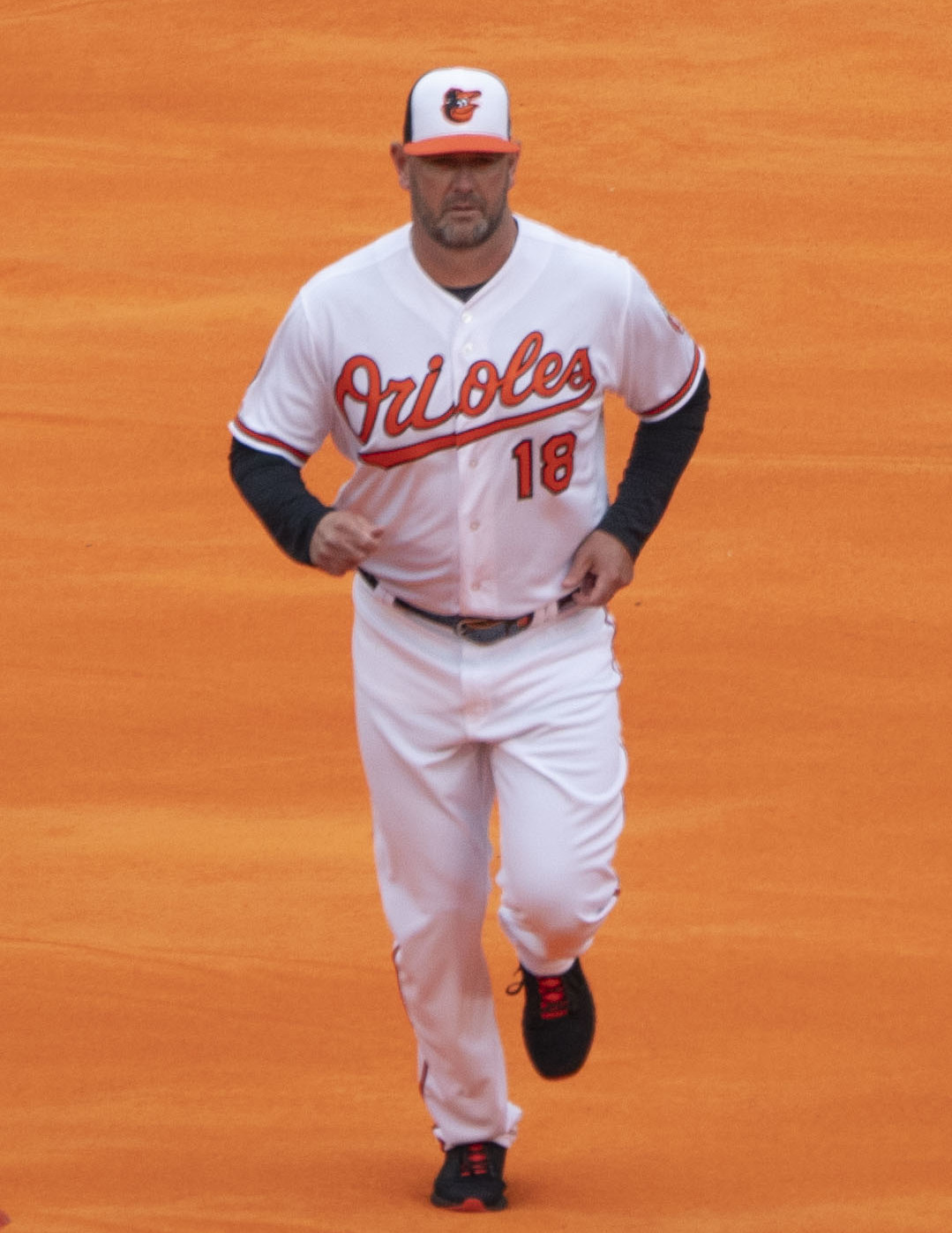
Hyde is introduced before his first game as Orioles manager

On December 14, 2018, the Baltimore Orioles named Hyde their new manager. On April 15, 2019, Hyde received his first career managerial ejection after arguing a slide rule call against the Boston Red Sox. In 2019, Hyde managed the Orioles to a 54–108 (.333) record, the second worst record in the league, second to only the Detroit Tigers. In the 60-game abbreviated 2020 season, Hyde and the Orioles finished 25–35 (.417), fourth in the division ahead of the Boston Red Sox. In 2020, he had his players attempt sacrifice bunts at a higher rate than any other major league manager. The Orioles finished the 2021 season with a 52–110 (.321) record.

In 2022, Hyde led the Orioles to an 83–79 (.512) record, a 31-game improvement from the previous year. Hyde finished second in AL Manager of the Year voting, losing to Terry Francona of the Cleveland Guardians.

In 2023, Hyde got his 300th win as an MLB manager in a 6–3 away victory over the Los Angeles Angels on September 4, in which the Orioles established a new American League record by surpassing the 1922–24 New York Yankees with 84 consecutive series of two-plus games of not being swept. The Orioles finished the 2023 season with a 101–61 (.623) record, the first 100-win season since 1980. Hyde led the Orioles to their first AL East title since 2014 and first playoff appearance since 2016. As a result, Hyde was named the AL Manager of the Year.

Hyde was fired by the Orioles on May 17, 2025, after they started the season 15–28 (.349). Third base coach Tony Mansolino was named interim manager.

=== Tampa Bay Rays ===
On December 1, 2025, the Tampa Bay Rays hired Hyde to serve as a senior advisor to the baseball operations department.

=== Managerial record ===
As of games played on May 16, 2025.

Team	Year	Regular season					Postseason			
Team	Year	Games	Won	Lost	Win %	Finish	Won	Lost	Win %	Result
FLA	2011	1	0	1	.000	(interim)	–	–	–	–
FLA Total		1	0	1	.000		-	-	-	
BAL	2019	162	54	108	.333	5th in AL East	–	–	–	–
BAL	2020	60	25	35	.417	4th in AL East	–	–	–	–
BAL	2021	162	52	110	.321	5th in AL East	–	–	–	–
BAL	2022	162	83	79	.512	4th in AL East	–	–	–	–
BAL	2023	162	101	61	.623	1st in AL East	0	3	.000	Lost ALDS (TEX)
BAL	2024	162	91	71	.562	2nd in AL East	0	2	.000	Lost ALWC (KC)
BAL	2025	43	15	28	.349	Fired	–	–	–	–
BAL Total		912	421	492	.461		0	5	.000	
Total		913	421	493	.461		0	5	.000	

Sporting positions
Preceded by Buck Showalter	Baltimore Orioles Manager; 2019–2025	Succeeded by Tony Mansolino (interim)
Preceded by Carlos Tosca	Florida Marlins bench coach 2010–2011	Succeeded by Joey Cora
Preceded by Jamie Quirk; Dave Martinez	Chicago Cubs bench coach 2014; 2018	Succeeded by Dave Martinez; Mark Loretta
Preceded by Eric Hinske	Chicago Cubs first base coach 2015–2017	Succeeded by Will Venable
