= Jacob Stallings =

American baseball player (born 1989)

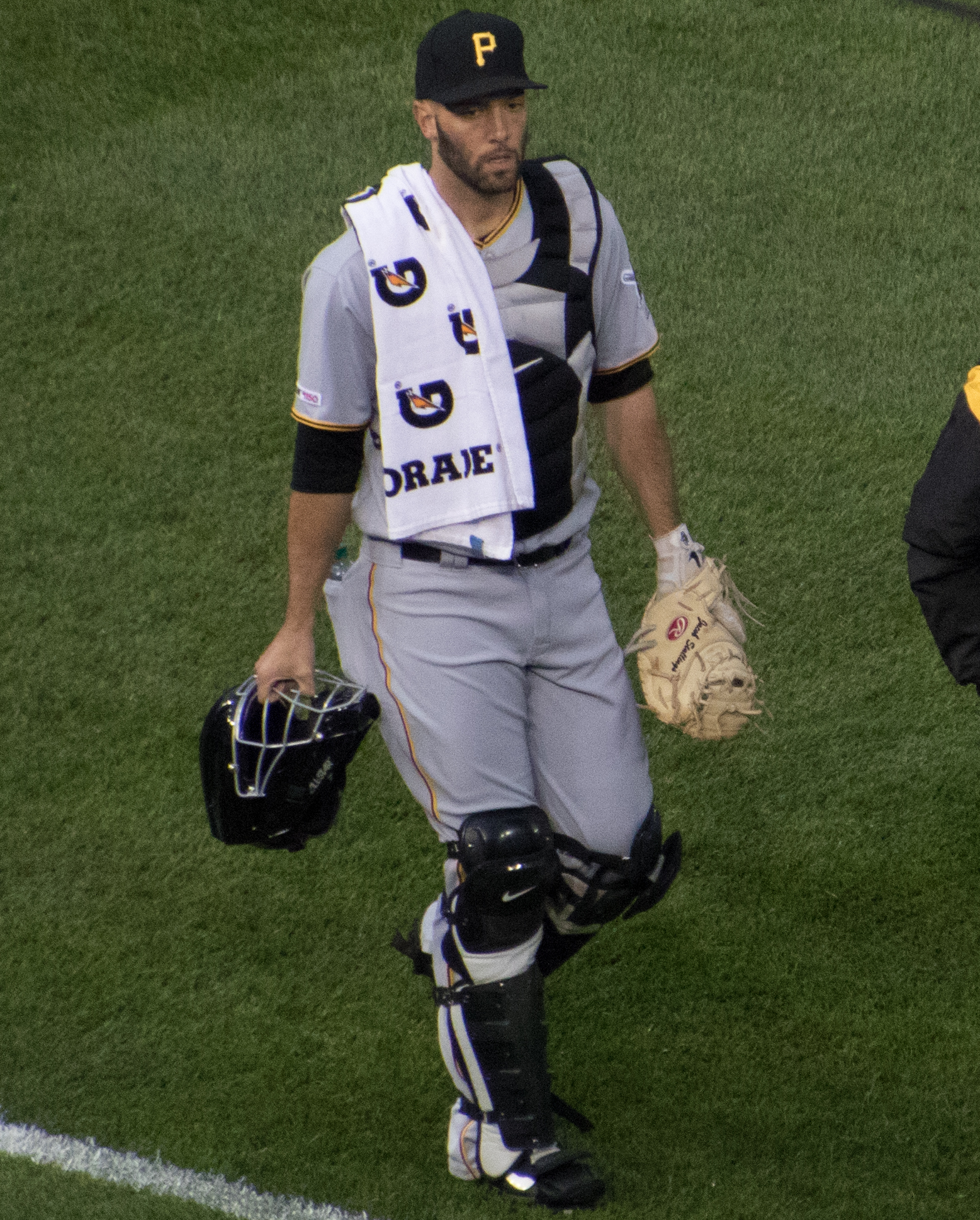
- Stallings with the Pittsburgh Pirates in 2019
- Catcher
- Born: December 22, 1989 (age 36); Lawrence, Kansas, U.S.
- Batted: Right Threw: Right

MLB debut
- June 19, 2016, for the Pittsburgh Pirates

Last MLB appearance
- July 26, 2025, for the Baltimore Orioles

MLB statistics
- Batting average: .232
- Home runs: 33
- Runs batted in: 193
- Stats at Baseball Reference

Teams
- Pittsburgh Pirates (2016–2021); Miami Marlins (2022–2023); Colorado Rockies (2024–2025); Baltimore Orioles (2025)

Career highlights and awards
- Gold Glove Award (2021)

Jacob Daniel Stallings (born December 22, 1989) is an American former professional baseball catcher who currently works in the Pittsburgh Pirates' front office. He played in Major League Baseball (MLB) for the Pirates, Miami Marlins, Colorado Rockies, and Baltimore Orioles from 2016 to 2025. In 2021, he won the Gold Glove Award and Fielding Bible Award.

== Amateur career ==
Stallings attended Brentwood Academy in Brentwood, Tennessee, and the University of North Carolina, where he played college baseball for the Tar Heels. In 2009 and 2010, he played collegiate summer baseball with the Chatham Anglers of the Cape Cod Baseball League. The Cincinnati Reds selected Stallings in the 42nd round of the 2011 MLB draft, but he did not sign and returned to North Carolina for his senior year.

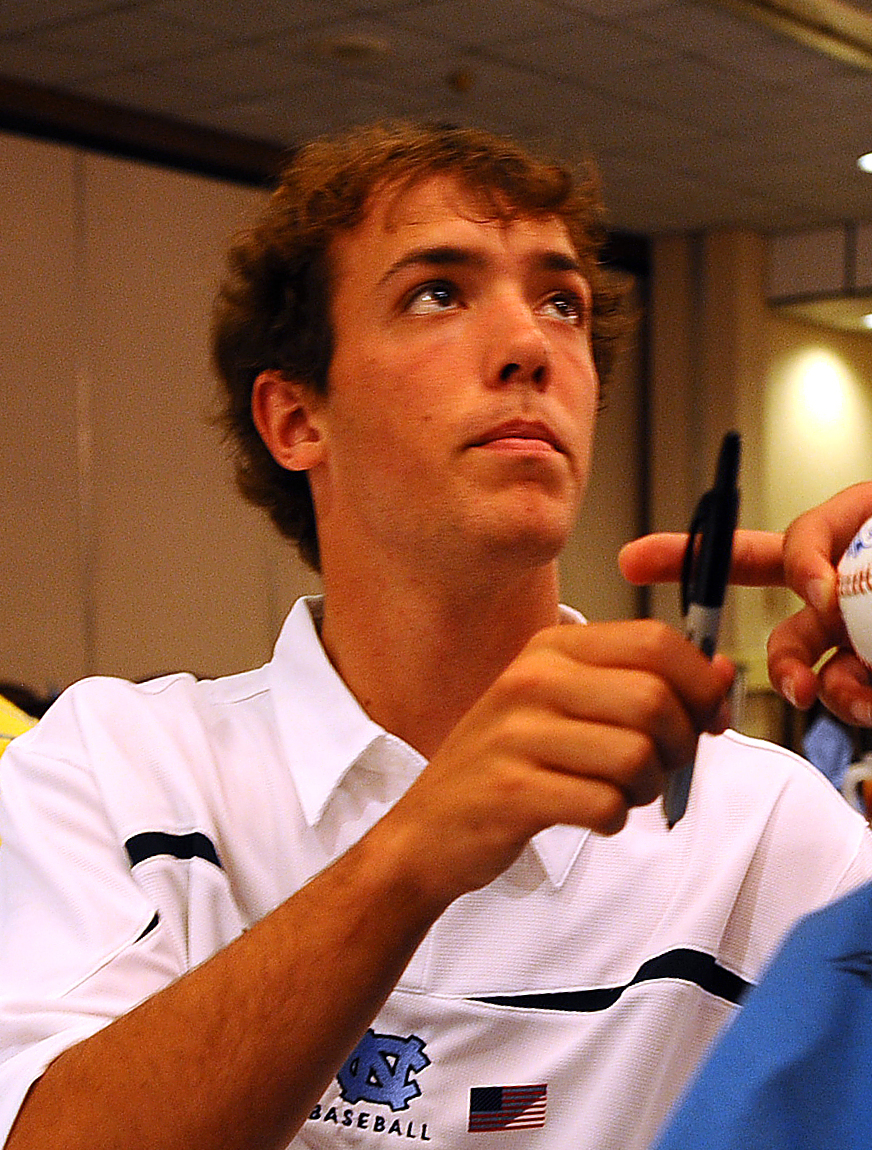
Stallings at Offutt Air Force Base with the UNC Tar Heels in 2009

== Professional career ==
=== Pittsburgh Pirates ===
The Pittsburgh Pirates selected Stallings in the seventh round of the 2012 MLB draft. He made his professional debut that same year with the State College Spikes, where he batted .230/.324/.332 in 66 games. He also played in one game for the Altoona Curve at the end of the season. In 2013, Stallings played for the Bradenton Marauders, where he hit .219 with six home runs and 23 RBIs in 78 games, and in 2014, he returned to Bradenton where he batted .241 with four home runs and 30 RBI in 68 games. Stallings spent 2015 with Altoona where he slashed .275/.313/.370 with three home runs and 32 RBI in 74 games. He began the 2016 season with the Indianapolis Indians.

Stallings was called up to the majors for the first time on June 19, 2016. Stallings recorded his first major league hit, a double, on June 21 against the San Francisco Giants. He was designated for assignment on July 5, and outrighted to back to Indianapolis after clearing waivers. In 80 games for Indianapolis, Stallings hit .214/.252/.350 with six home runs and 28 RBI. Stallings was recalled again by the Pirates on September 13. On September 23, he had a game-winning RBI single in the Pirates' 6–5 win over the Washington Nationals. Stallings was removed from the 40-man roster and sent outright to Triple-A Indianapolis on November 2.

In 2017, Stallings spent the majority of the season with Indianapolis, slashing .301/.358/.431 with four home runs and 38 RBI in 62 games. He also played in five games for Pittsburgh. Stallings began 2018 with Indianapolis, and was recalled by the Pirates on June 10. On September 17, he had a game-winning RBI single in the Pirates' 7–6 win over the Kansas City Royals. In 2018, with Pittsburgh, Stallings batted 216/.268/.216.

Stallings entered the 2019 season out of minor league options. He was outrighted off the roster on May 17, but was promoted back to the major leagues on May 26 when Francisco Cervelli went on the injured list.

In 2020, Stallings batted .248/.326/.376 for the Pirates with three home runs and 18 RBIs. He had the slowest average baserunning speed from home plate to first base of all major leaguers, at 5.11 seconds.

On July 17, 2021, Stallings hit a walk-off grand slam to beat the New York Mets 9–7, the third walk-off grand slam in PNC Park history. Stallings finished the 2021 season batting .246/.335/.369 with eight home runs and 53 RBIs in 113 games. He won the Gold Glove Award and Fielding Bible Award that year.

=== Miami Marlins ===
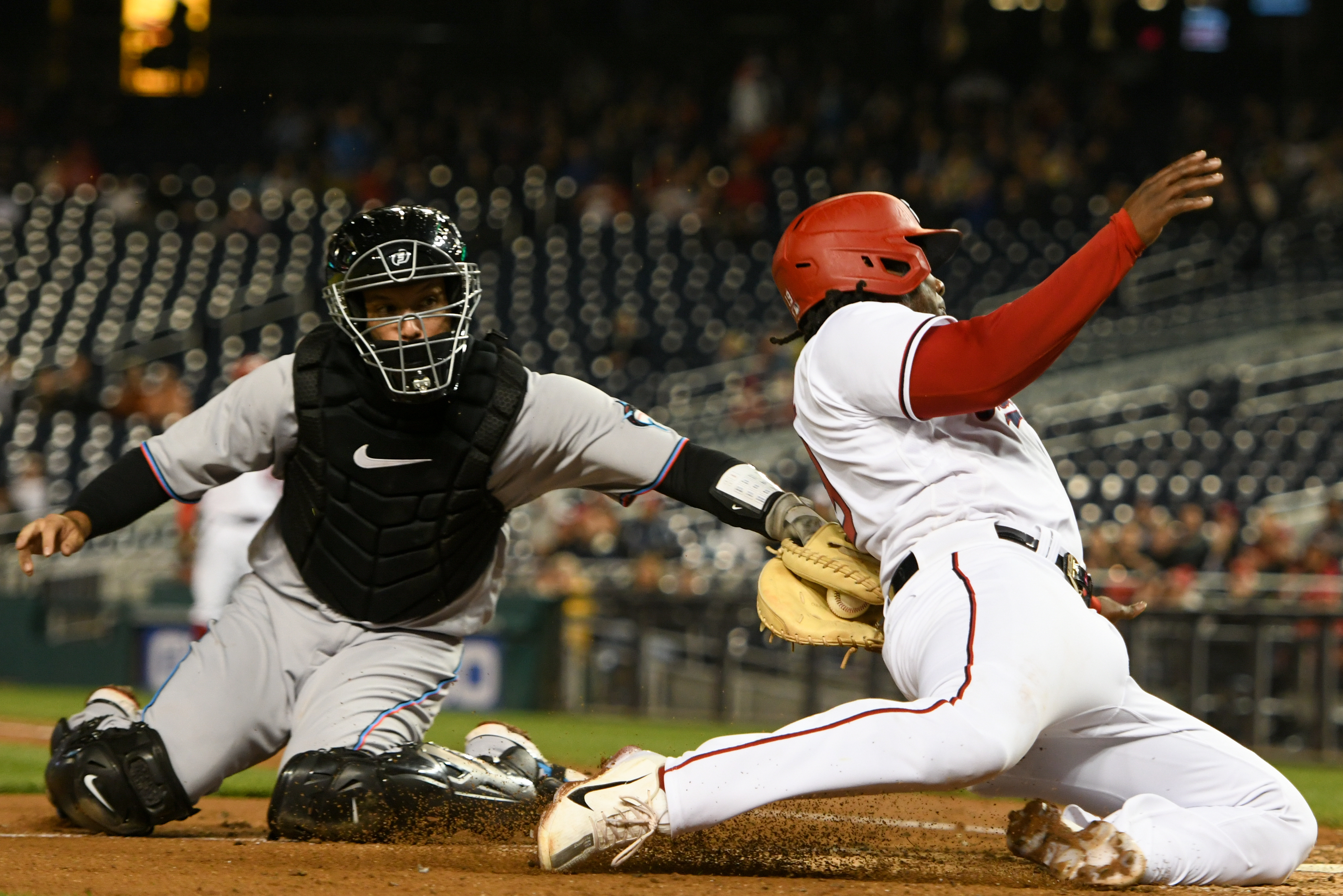
Stallings (left) tagging baserunner Josh Bell during a 2022 game at Nationals Park

On November 29, 2021, the Pirates traded Stallings to the Miami Marlins in exchange for Zach Thompson and minor leaguers Kyle Nicolas and Connor Scott. Stallings' salary for the 2022 season was decided in an arbitration hearing on June 18. He requested $3.1 million and was awarded $2.45 million. He made 114 appearances for Miami, slashing .223/.292/.292 with four home runs and 34 RBI.

On January 13, 2023, Stallings agreed to a one-year, $3.35 million contract with the Marlins, avoiding salary arbitration. On May 3, Stallings replaced Devin Smeltzer as the pitcher in the ninth inning of a game against the Atlanta Braves. After recording a double play, Stallings faced April NL Player of the Month Ronald Acuña Jr., whom he struck out on four pitches. In 88 appearances for Miami during the year. he batted .191/.278/.286 with three home runs and 20 RBI. Stallings was non-tendered by the Marlins and became a free agent on November 17.

=== Colorado Rockies ===
On January 5, 2024, Stallings signed a one-year contract with the Colorado Rockies. In 82 games for Colorado, he slashed .263/.357/.453 with a career-high nine home runs and 36 RBI. On November 4, Stallings declined his option for the 2025 season and became a free agent.

On November 20, 2024, Stallings returned to the Rockies on a one-year, $2.5 million contract including a mutual option for 2026 worth $2 million. In 28 appearances for the Rockies in 2025, he batted .143/.217/.179 with no home runs and six RBI. Stallings was released by Colorado on June 6, 2025.

=== Baltimore Orioles ===
On June 24, 2025, Stallings signed a minor league contract with the Baltimore Orioles organization. In three games for the Triple-A Norfolk Tides, he went 4-for-10 with two RBI and two walks. On July 1, Stallings was selected to Baltimore's active roster following an injury to Chadwick Tromp. In 14 appearances for the Orioles, he went 4-for-35 (.119) with three RBI. Stallings was designated for assignment by Baltimore on July 28. He cleared waivers and elected free agency on July 31.

== Post-playing career ==
Stallings retired from baseball after the 2025 season. On February 11, 2026, he joined the front office of the Pittsburgh Pirates as a specialist in baseball operations.

== Personal life ==
Stallings' father, Kevin, was the head college basketball coach at Illinois State, Vanderbilt, and Pittsburgh.
