= Tony Mansolino =

American baseball player, coach and manager (born 1982)

Atlanta Braves – No. 89
- Coach / Manager
- Born: September 28, 1982 (age 43); Newport Beach, California, U.S.

MLB statistics (through 2025 season)
- Managerial record: 60–59
- Winning %: .504

Teams
- As manager: Baltimore Orioles (2025); As coach: Cleveland Indians (2020); Baltimore Orioles (2021–2025); Atlanta Braves (2026–present)

Anthony Joseph Mansolino (born September 28, 1982) is an American former professional baseball infielder, minor league manager, and coach who is the bench coach for the Atlanta Braves of Major League Baseball (MLB). He recently served as the interim manager of the Baltimore Orioles and also was the third base coach for the Cleveland Indians in 2020 and the Orioles from 2021 until his promotion.

== Career ==
=== Cleveland Guardians ===
Mansolino attended Vanderbilt University, where he played college baseball for the Vanderbilt Commodores. In 2003, he played collegiate summer baseball with the Yarmouth–Dennis Red Sox of the Cape Cod Baseball League. The Pittsburgh Pirates selected him in the 26th round of the 2005 MLB draft. He played in Minor League Baseball for six seasons before being hired by the Cleveland Indians to serve as the hitting coach for the Mahoning Valley Scrappers. He was the manager for the Lake County Captains in 2016. Mansolino managed the Lynchburg Hillcats in 2017, and was named the Carolina League Manager of the Year. He was promoted to manage the Akron RubberDucks in 2018 and the Columbus Clippers in 2019.

During the 2020 season, Mansolino served as Cleveland's third base coach when Mike Sarbaugh, their third base coach, served as the acting bench coach while Sandy Alomar Jr., the bench coach, filled in as their acting manager while Terry Francona was away from the team with a medical condition.

=== Baltimore Orioles ===
The Orioles hired Mansolino as their third base coach after the 2020 season.

On May 17, 2025, the Orioles named Mansolino their interim manager after firing Brandon Hyde. He finished the campaign with a 60–59 record after the ballclub's 15–28 start.

=== Atlanta Braves ===
In November 2025, Mansolino was named as bench coach for the Atlanta Braves for the 2026 season.

=== Managerial record ===
As of September 28, 2025

Team	Year	Regular season					Postseason			
Team	Year	Games	Won	Lost	Win %	Finish	Won	Lost	Win %	Result
BAL	2025	119	60	59	.504		–	–	–	–
Total		119	60	59	.504		0	0	–	

== Personal life ==
His father, Doug Mansolino, is a former baseball coach.

Sporting positions
Preceded by Brandon Hyde	Baltimore Orioles Manager; 2025-present	Succeeded by incumbent
