= José Espada =

Puerto Rican baseball player (born 1997)

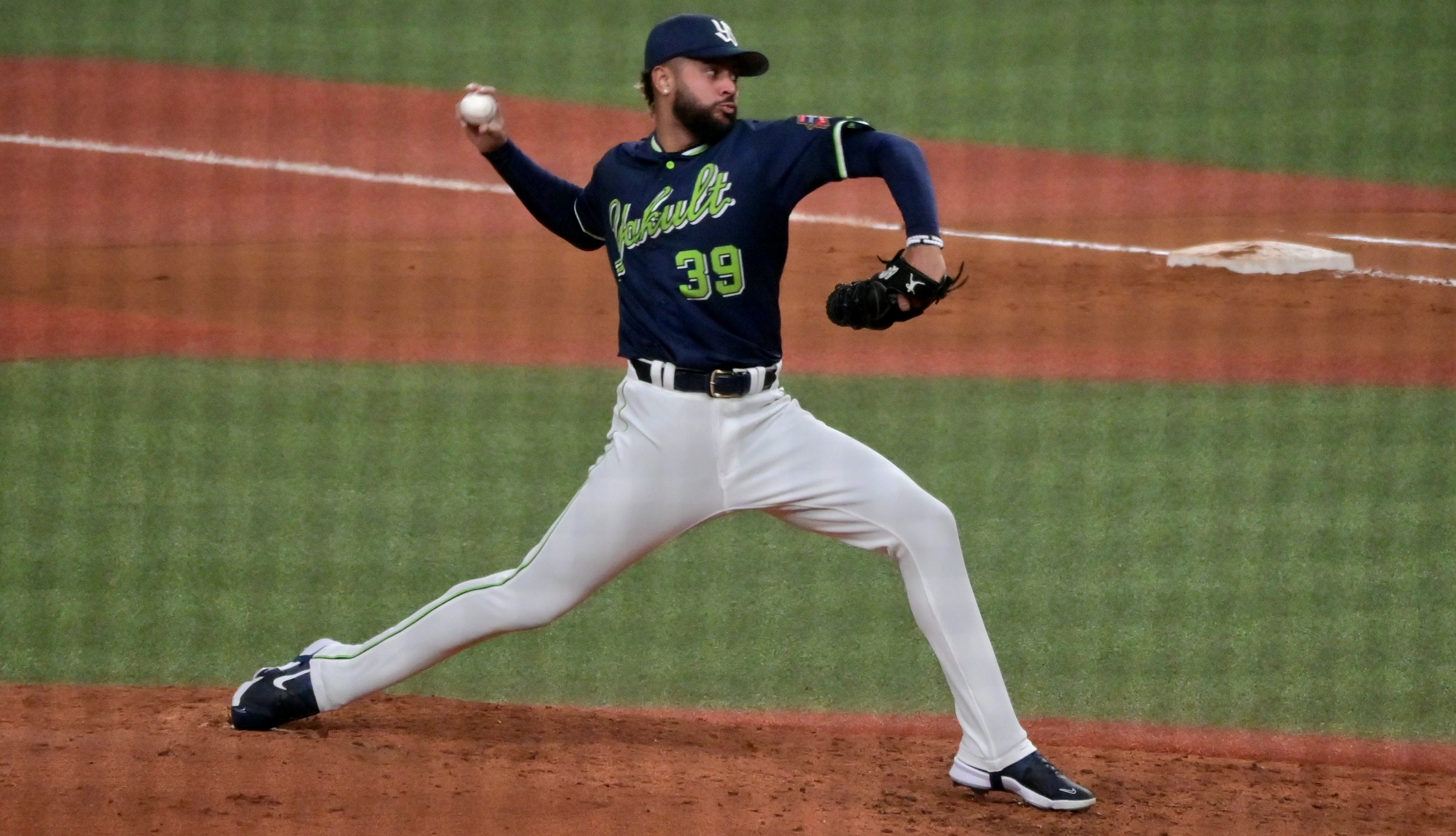
- Espada with the Tokyo Yakult Swallows

Minnesota Twins
- Pitcher
- Born: February 22, 1997 (age 29); Ponce, Puerto Rico
- Bats: Right Throws: Right

Professional debut
- MLB: September 24, 2023, for the San Diego Padres
- NPB: March 29, 2024, for the Tokyo Yakult Swallows

MLB statistics (through 2026 season)
- Win–loss record: 0–0
- Earned run average: 0.00
- Strikeouts: 6

NPB statistics (through 2024 season)
- Win–loss record: 0–2
- Earned run average: 5.00
- Strikeouts: 16
- Stats at Baseball Reference

Teams
- San Diego Padres (2023); Tokyo Yakult Swallows (2024); Baltimore Orioles (2025–2026)

José Manuel Espada (born February 22, 1997) is a Puerto Rican professional baseball pitcher in the Minnesota Twins organization. He has previously played Major League Baseball (MLB) for the San Diego Padres and Baltimore Orioles, and in Nippon Professional Baseball (NPB) for the Tokyo Yakult Swallows.

== Career ==
=== Toronto Blue Jays ===
Espada was drafted by the Toronto Blue Jays in the fifth round, with the 152nd overall selection, of the 2015 Major League Baseball draft. He made his professional debut with the rookie–level Gulf Coast League Blue Jays, posting a 3.41 ERA in 10 games (7 starts). In 2016, Espada made 12 appearances (10 starts) for the rookie–level Bluefield Blue Jays, recording a 4.92 ERA with 32 strikeouts across 53.0 innings of work.

Espada spent the 2017 and 2018 seasons with the Low–A Vancouver Canadians, posting a 5.14 ERA and 4.88 ERA in 13 games each season. He split the 2019 season between the GCL Blue Jays and Single–A Lansing Lugnuts. In 10 total appearances, Espada logged a 3.09 ERA with 13 strikeouts in 11 2/3 innings pitched.

=== Boston Red Sox ===
On December 12, 2019, the Boston Red Sox selected Espada in the minor league phase of the Rule 5 draft. He did not play in a game in 2020 due to the cancellation of the minor league season because of the COVID-19 pandemic.

Espada returned to action in 2021, spending the year with the High–A Greenville Drive. On September 2, Espada, Jeremy Wu-Yelland, Oddanier Mosqueda, and Jake Wallace pitched a combined no-hitter against the Asheville Tourists. In 28 appearances for the Drive, Espada registered a 3.09 ERA with 53 strikeouts across 43 2/3 innings pitched. Espada elected free agency following the season on November 7, 2021.

=== Milwaukee Milkmen ===
On February 1, 2022, Espada signed with the Milwaukee Milkmen of the American Association of Professional Baseball. In 8 starts for the club, Espada posted a 2–1 record and 3.61 ERA with 55 strikeouts across 42 1/3 innings pitched.

=== San Diego Padres ===
On July 1, 2022, Espada had his contract purchased by the San Diego Padres organization. In 11 games (7 starts) for the High–A Fort Wayne TinCaps, he pitched to a 1–3 record and 4.05 ERA with 58 strikeouts across 40.0 innings of work.

In 2023, Espada appeared in 38 games for the Double–A San Antonio Missions and Triple–A El Paso Chihuahuas, accumulating a 2.81 ERA and 110 strikeouts in 83 1/3 innings pitched. On September 22, 2023, Espada was selected to the 40-man roster and promoted to the major leagues for the first time. He made his MLB debut on September 24, tossing a scoreless inning of relief against the St. Louis Cardinals and striking out two. On November 17, Espada was non-tendered and became a free agent. On December 1, he re–signed with the Padres organization on a minor league contract.

=== Tokyo Yakult Swallows ===
On December 17, 2023, Espada signed with the Tokyo Yakult Swallows of Nippon Professional Baseball. He made 24 appearances for the Swallows in 2024, compiling an 0–2 record and 5.00 ERA with 16 strikeouts across 27 innings pitched. On November 8, 2024, the Swallows announced they would not extend a contract to Espada for the 2025 season, making him a free agent.

=== San Diego Padres (second stint) ===
On December 16, 2024, Espada signed a minor league contract with the San Diego Padres. In 29 appearances split between the Double-A San Antonio Missions and Triple-A El Paso Chihuahuas, he accumulated a 3-1 record and 3.38 ERA with 58 strikeouts and three saves across 37 1/3 innings pitched. Espada was released by the Padres organization on July 22, 2025.

=== Baltimore Orioles ===
On July 26, 2025, Espada signed a minor league contract with the Baltimore Orioles. On August 11, the Orioles added Espada to their 40-man roster and subsequently optioned him to the Triple-A Norfolk Tides. He made one appearance for Baltimore, tossing three scoreless innings against the New York Yankees on September 20.

Espada was optioned to Triple-A Norfolk to begin the 2026 season. He made one scoreless appearance for Baltimore, logging one frame against the Houston Astros on April 30, 2026. Espada was designated for assignment by the Orioles on May 18, following the acquisition of Michael Siani. He cleared waivers and was sent outright to Norfolk on May 21. In 42 games between Double-A and Triple-A he threw 50 innings of relief going 4-2 with a 3.06 ERA with 50 strikeouts and 8 saves. He elected free agency on November 2.

=== Minnesota Twins ===
On November 11, 2026, Espada signed a minor league contract with the Minnesota Twins.

== See also ==
- Rule 5 draft results
