= Maverick Handley =

American baseball player (born 1998)

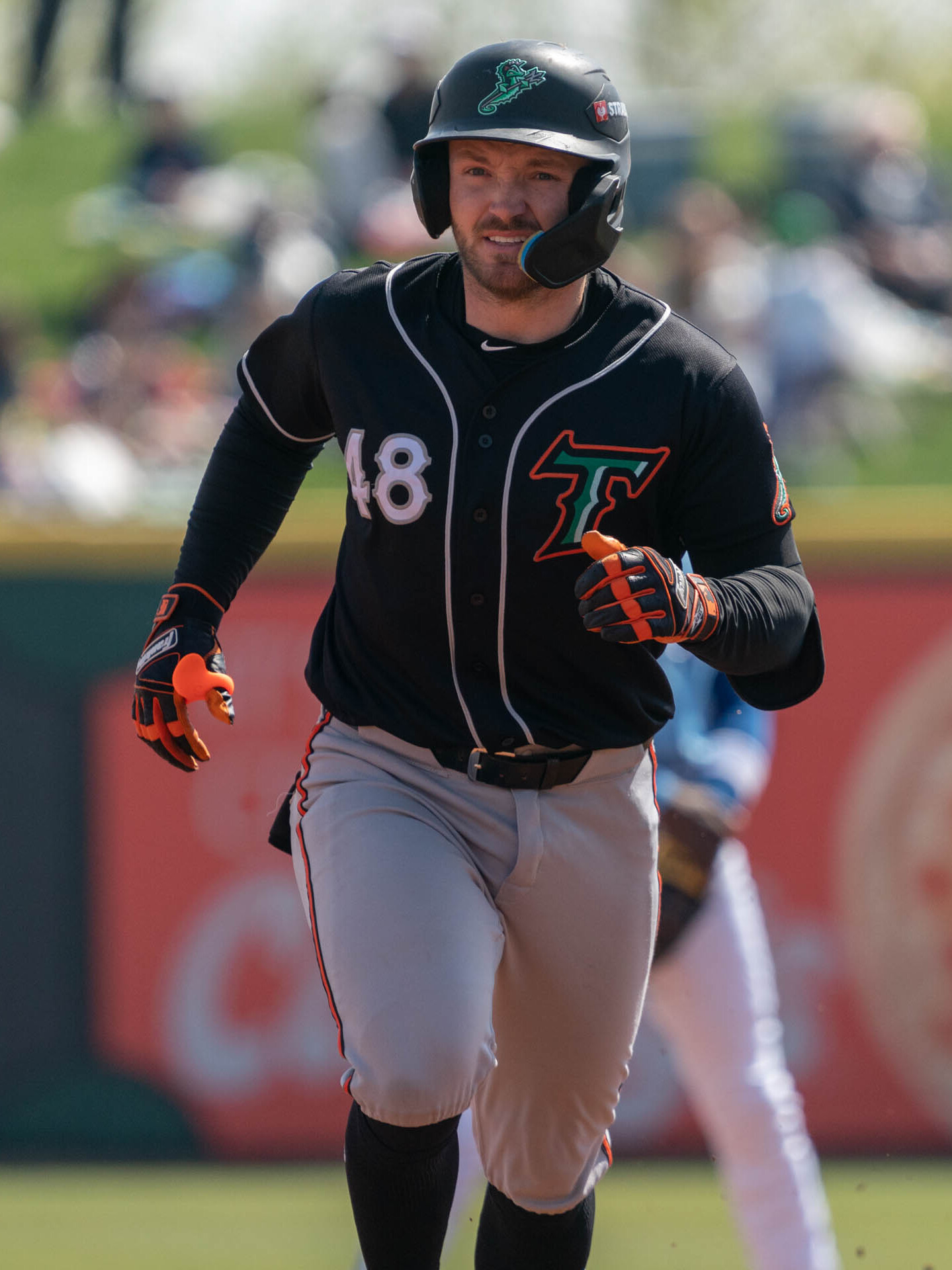
- Handley with the Norfolk Tides in 2025

Atlanta Braves
- Catcher
- Born: March 10, 1998 (age 28); Denver, Colorado, U.S.
- Bats: Right Throws: Right

MLB debut
- April 29, 2025, for the Baltimore Orioles

MLB statistics (through 2026 season)
- Batting average: .071
- Home runs: 0
- Runs batted in: 3
- Stats at Baseball Reference

Teams
- Baltimore Orioles (2025–2026)

Maverick Dayne Handley (born March 10, 1998) is an American professional baseball catcher in the Atlanta Braves organization. He has previously played in Major League Baseball (MLB) for the Baltimore Orioles. He made his MLB debut in 2025.

== Amateur career ==
Handley attended Mullen High School in Denver, Colorado, and played college baseball for the Stanford Cardinal. As a junior with Stanford, he slashed .290/.393/.442 with five home runs, 24 RBIs, and 12 stolen bases, in addition to being named the Pac-12 Co-Defensive Player of the Year. In 2018, he played collegiate summer baseball with the Falmouth Commodores of the Cape Cod Baseball League.

== Professional career ==
=== Baltimore Orioles ===
The Baltimore Orioles selected Handley in the 6th round, with the 168th overall selection, of the 2019 Major League Baseball draft. He made his professional debut with the Aberdeen IronBirds, batting .202 with four RBI in 41 games. Handley did not play in a game in 2020 due to the COVID-19 pandemic's cancellation of the minor league season. He returned to action in 2021 with Aberdeen, hitting .201 with five home runs and 39 RBI in 60 games. With the Double-A Bowie Baysox in 2022, Handley hit .236 with 11 home runs and 45 RBI. He split the 2023 campaign between Bowie and the Triple-A Norfolk Tides, batting .238 with five home runs and 33 RBI. With Norfolk in 2024, he batted .202 and hit three home runs with 26 RBI.

To begin the 2025 season, Handley was assigned to Triple-A Norfolk, slashing .346/.433/.558 in 15 games. On April 28, 2025, Handley was selected to the 40-man roster and promoted to the major leagues for the first time. He made his MLB debut the following day against the New York Yankees, entering the game as a defensive substitution. On May 8, against the Minnesota Twins, he collected his first career hit, a single off of Bailey Ober. On June 14, Handley was optioned to Norfolk after batting 3-for-40 (.075). A week later, he was recalled to the active roster following an injury to Adley Rutschman. On June 22, in a game against the New York Yankees, Handley was removed from the game after colliding with Jazz Chisholm Jr.. The next day, he was placed on the injured list with a concussion. In 16 appearances for Baltimore, Handley went 3-for-41 (.073) with three RBI and two walks. Handley was designated for assignment by the Orioles following the signing of Pete Alonso on December 11. On December 17, he cleared waivers and was sent outright to Triple-A Norfolk.

On April 11, 2026, the Orioles added Handley to their active roster following an injury to Rutschman. He made one appearance for the team on May 16, striking out against Washington Nationals reliever Paxton Schultz in his only at-bat. On May 19, Handley was designated for assignment by the Orioles.

=== Atlanta Braves ===
On May 21, 2026, Handley was claimed off of waivers by the Atlanta Braves. He made five appearances for the Triple-A Gwinnett Stripers, going 5-for-16 (.313) with two RBI and one stolen base. Handley was released by the Braves on June 12. He re-signed with the team on a minor league contract the next day.

On November 3, 2026, Handley re-signed with the Braves on a minor league contract for the 2027 season.
