= Chadwick Tromp =

Aruban baseball player (born 1995)

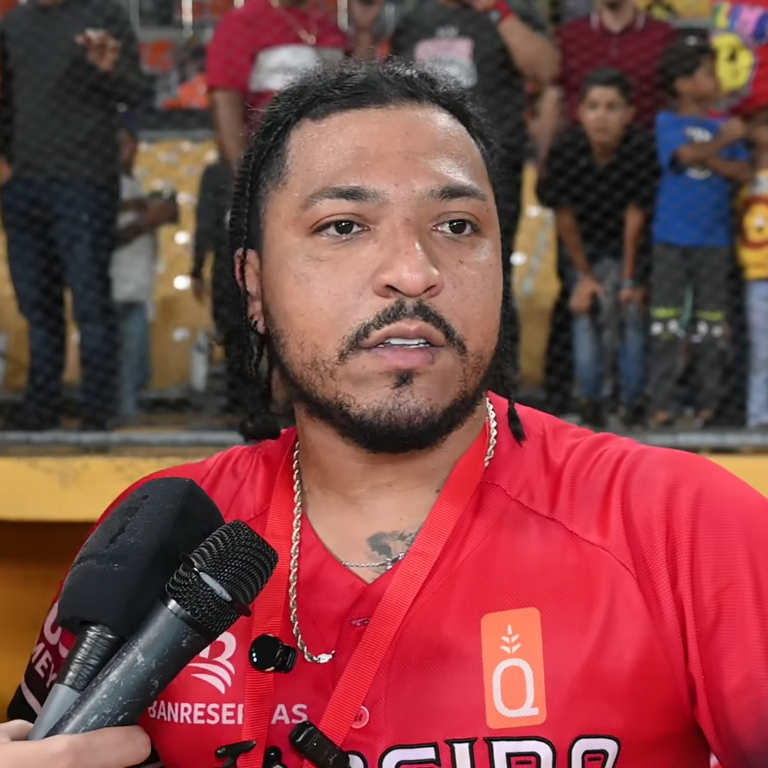
- Tromp with the Leones del Escogido in 2025

Free agent
- Catcher
- Born: March 21, 1995 (age 31); Oranjestad, Aruba
- Bats: Right Throws: Right

MLB debut
- July 29, 2020, for the San Francisco Giants

MLB statistics (through 2026 season)
- Batting average: .208
- Home runs: 6
- Runs batted in: 27
- Stats at Baseball Reference

Teams
- San Francisco Giants (2020–2021); Atlanta Braves (2022–2025); Baltimore Orioles (2025); Atlanta Braves (2026); Baltimore Orioles (2026)
Medals
Men's baseball
Representing Netherlands
European Baseball Championship
Gold medal – first place	2016 Hoofddorp	National team

Chadwick Chandler Tromp (born March 21, 1995) is an Aruban professional baseball catcher who is a free agent. He has previously played in Major League Baseball (MLB) for the San Francisco Giants, Atlanta Braves, and Baltimore Orioles.

Tromp signed with the Cincinnati Reds organization in 2013 as an international free agent. He signed with the Giants in 2020 and made his MLB debut that season. He has also played for the Netherlands national team.

== Early life ==
Tromp was raised in Palm Beach, Aruba, and began playing catcher at the age of 11.

== Career ==
=== Cincinnati Reds ===
On May 24, 2013, Tromp signed with the Cincinnati Reds organization as an international free agent. He was assigned to the rookie-level Arizona League Reds, where he spent the season. In 2014, Tromp split time between the AZL Reds and the Single-A Dayton Dragons. He batted .311/.345/.472 with three home runs and 13 RBI in 106 at-bats.

In 2015, Tromp played for Dayton and a game for the Triple-A Louisville Bats. In 2016, Tromp played the entire season for the High-A Daytona Tortugas.

Tromp spent 2017 with Daytona and the Double-A Pensacola Blue Wahoos. Before the 2018 season, FanGraphs projected him to be a "glove-first backup" catcher. He was invited to spring training in 2018, but did not make the club and played in 25 games for Pensacola and 53 for Triple-A Louisville on the year.

In 2019, Tromp spent time with the AZL Reds and Louisville. He batted a combined .280/.397/.568 with nine home runs and 37 RBI in 125 at-bats. He elected free agency following the season on November 4.

=== San Francisco Giants ===
On January 6, 2020, Tromp signed a minor league contract with the San Francisco Giants organization. On July 28, he was selected to the 40-man roster and promoted to the major leagues for the first time. Tromp made his MLB debut the next day against the San Diego Padres and went hitless in four at bats. Tromp hit his first home run in the majors on August 2, in a 9–5 loss to the Texas Rangers. In 24 games for San Francisco during his rookie season, Tromp batted .213/.219/.426 with four home runs and 10 RBI. On December 2, Tromp was non-tendered by the Giants and became a free agent. On December 9, Tromp re-signed with the Giants on a major league contract.

Tromp made nine appearances for San Francisco in 2021, hitting .222 with one home run and two RBI. On September 18, Tromp was designated for assignment by the Giants.

=== Atlanta Braves ===
On September 21, 2021, the Atlanta Braves claimed Tromp off waivers from San Francisco, and optioned him to the Triple-A Gwinnett Stripers. On April 12, 2022, Tromp was designated for assignment by the Braves. He cleared waivers and was outrighted to Triple-A Gwinnett Stripers on April 19.

On August 6, Tromp was called up to Atlanta as a backup catcher, following an injury to Travis d'Arnaud. On August 13, Tromp had a three-hit, three RBI performance in his first start for Atlanta against the Miami Marlins. This was his only major league game in 2022. Tromp was recalled to the major leagues on April 9, 2023, after d'Arnaud was injured in a game the previous day. On May 8, Tromp was optioned to Gwinnett. He played in 6 games for Atlanta in 2023, going 2-for-16 (.125) with one RBI. On November 17, Tromp was non-tendered and became a free agent. On November 22, he re-signed with the Braves on a minor league contract.

On March 30, 2024, Tromp was selected to the active roster following an injury to Sean Murphy. In 19 games for the Braves in 2024, he slashed .250/.259/.365 with six RBI.

Tromp played in two games for Atlanta in 2025, going 0-for-5 with one walk in six plate appearances. He was designated for assignment by the Braves on April 6. He elected free agency on April 8.

=== Baltimore Orioles ===
On April 13, 2025, Tromp signed a minor league contract with the Baltimore Orioles. In 20 games for the Triple-A Norfolk Tides, he batted .254/.338/.413 with three home runs and 10 RBI. On May 26, the Orioles selected Tromp's contract, adding him to their active roster. After two games for Baltimore, Tromp was designated for assignment by the Orioles on May 31. He cleared waivers and elected free agency on June 3. Tromp re-signed with Baltimore on a minor league contract the same day. On June 23, the Orioles added Tromp back to their active roster after Maverick Handley suffered an injury. However, Tromp himself was placed on the injured list with a low back strain on July 1; in six games for Baltimore, he had gone 3-for-16 (.188) with a solo home run. On July 25, Tromp was activated from the injured list; he was subsequently removed from the 40-man roster and sent outright to the minors. He rejected the assignment, electing free agency.

=== Boston Red Sox ===
On July 29, 2025, Tromp signed a minor league contract with the Boston Red Sox. In 28 appearances for the Triple-A Worcester Red Sox, he batted .135/.183/.167 with eight RBI and two stolen bases. Tromp elected free agency following the season on November 6.

=== Atlanta Braves (second stint) ===
On November 14, 2025, Tromp signed a minor league contract with the Atlanta Braves. He began the 2026 campaign with the Triple-A Gwinnett Stripers, slashing .169/.253/.325 with three home runs and 12 RBI in 24 appearances. On May 19, 2026, the Braves selected Tromp to the major leagues after starting catcher Drake Baldwin was placed on the injured list. In 12 appearances for Atlanta, he went 5-for-25 (.200) with three RBI. Tromp was designated for assignment by the Braves following the acquisition of Austin Wynns on June 4. On June 6, he cleared waivers and elected free agency.

=== Baltimore Orioles (second stint) ===
On June 10, 2026, Tromp signed a minor league contract with the Baltimore Orioles. Following four appearances for the Triple-A Norfolk Tides, Tromp was added to Baltimore's active roster on June 22. He was designated for assignment on July 3. Tromp cleared waivers and was sent outright to Norfolk on July 8. On July 20, Tromp was selected back to the major league roster a second time. After going 1-for-21 (.048) across eight appearances, Tromp was designated for assignment by the Orioles on July 31. He cleared waivers and elected free agency on August 4.

=== Los Angeles Dodgers ===
On August 13, 2026, Tromp signed a minor league contract with the Los Angeles Dodgers. In 18 games for the Triple-A Oklahoma City Comets, he had nine hits in 41 at-bats (.220 average), with one home run and five RBI. He elected free agency on November 2.

== International career ==
Tromp had played for the Netherlands national team in several international tournaments. He first joined the team for the 2016 European Baseball Championship, batting .250 in three starts.

Tromp has also been on the team's roster for the 2017, 2023, and 2026 World Baseball Classic (WBC) and the 2019 WBSC Premier12. He was a late addition to the 2017 WBC roster, replacing the injured Didi Gregorius during the tournament. Tromp batted .286 with a home run against Italy in the 2023 WBC.

== Personal life ==
Tromp's older brother Jiandido, also played for the Netherlands and in the minor leagues.
