= 2027 Seattle Mariners season =

2027 Seattle Mariners
- League: American League
- Division: West
- Ballpark: T-Mobile Park
- City: Seattle, Washington
- Owners: Baseball Club of Seattle, LP, represented by CEO John Stanton
- President of baseball operations: Jerry Dipoto
- General manager: Justin Hollander
- Manager: Jason Kanzler
- Television: MLB Local Media (Aaron Goldsmith, Jay Buhner, Dave Valle, Angie Mentink, Ryan Rowland-Smith, Bill Krueger, Jen Mueller, Ryon Healy, Brad Adam)
- Radio: ESPN-710; Seattle Mariners Radio Network (Gary Hill Jr., Mark McLemore, Ken Phelps, Angie Mentink, Ryan Rowland-Smith, Shannon Drayer)

The 2027 Seattle Mariners season is scheduled to be the 51st season in franchise history and their 28th full season (29th overall) at T-Mobile Park, their home ballpark in Seattle, Washington.

The season is contingent on Major League Baseball (MLB) and the Major League Baseball Players Association (MLBPA) signing a new collective bargaining agreement (CBA). Without a new CBA, MLB is expected to lock out the players on December 2, 2026, until one is signed. If such a lockout extends indefinitely, the season could be postponed, shortened, or even cancelled.

The Mariners is scheduled to open the season at home against the Boston Red Sox on March 25 and finish the season on September 26 in West Sacramento, California, against the Athletics.

== Offseason ==
After finishing the 2026 season in third place in the American League West and with a losing record for the first time since 2020, manager Dan Wilson stepped down and many coaches were not retained. The team announced days after the season ended that bench coach Manny Acta, hitting coach Kevin Seitzer, infield coach Perry Hill, and first base coach Eric Young Jr. would not return in 2027. The team hired Jason Kanzler as manager on November 3. Bench coach Tanner Swanson and hitting coach C. J. Gillman were formally hired on November 9.

The Mariners completed the first major trade of the MLB offseason, acquiring All-Star third baseman Maikel García and two pitchers for two starters from the back of their rotation, Bryce Miller and the injured Logan Evans, and reliever José A. Ferrer.

=== Transactions ===
- October 2, 2026: Claimed Michael Toglia off waivers from the Cincinnati Reds.
- October 29: Claimed Grant McCray off waivers from the San Francisco Giants. Randy Arozarena, J. P. Crawford, Hoby Milner, Victor Robles, and Taylor Ward elected free agency.
- November 2: Claimed Isaac Mattson off waivers from the Pittsburgh Pirates. Extended a qualifying offer to Arozarena. Outrighted Josh Simpson, Troy Watson, Weston Wilson, Will Wilson, and Patrick Wisdom.
- November 3: Jason Kanzler hired as manager.
- November 17: Arozarena rejected the qualifying offer, entitling the Mariners to a compensatory 2027 MLB draft pick. Bryce Conley and Johnathan Lavallee signed minor league contracts.
- November 18: Acquired Maikel García, James McArthur, and L. P. Langevin from the Kansas City Royals in exchange for Bryce Miller, Logan Evans, and José A. Ferrer.
- November 20: Luke Raley elected free agency.

== Regular season ==
=== Game log ===
The 2027 schedule is tentative until a new collective bargaining agreement (CBA) is signed between Major League Baseball (MLB) and the Major League Baseball Players Association (MLBPA). If the labor dispute extends into late February or early March, MLB would then start to consider whether to postpone or shorten the season.

Legend
	Mariners win
	Mariners loss
	Postponement
**Bold**	Mariners team member

2027 Game Log: 0–0 (Home: 0–0; Road: 0–0)
March/April: 0–0 (Home: 0–0; Road: 0–0)

#	Date	Opponent	Score	Win	Loss	Save	Attendance	Record	Streak
1	March 25	Red Sox	—	—	—	—	—	–	—
2	March 26	Red Sox	—	—	—	—	—	–	—
3	March 27	Red Sox	—	—	—	—	—	–	—
4	March 28	Red Sox	—	—	—	—	—	–	—
5	March 29	Rangers	—	—	—	—	—	–	—
6	March 30	Rangers	—	—	—	—	—	–	—
7	March 31	Rangers	—	—	—	—	—	–	—
8	April 2	@ Blue Jays	—	—	—	—	—	–	—
9	April 3	@ Blue Jays	—	—	—	—	—	–	—
10	April 4	@ Blue Jays	—	—	—	—	—	–	—
11	April 5	@ Guardians	—	—	—	—	—	–	—
12	April 6	@ Guardians	—	—	—	—	—	–	—
13	April 7	@ Guardians	—	—	—	—	—	–	—
14	April 9	Rockies	—	—	—	—	—	–	—
15	April 10	Rockies	—	—	—	—	—	–	—
16	April 11	Rockies	—	—	—	—	—	–	—
17	April 13	White Sox	—	—	—	—	—	–	—
18	April 14	White Sox	—	—	—	—	—	–	—
19	April 15	White Sox	—	—	—	—	—	–	—
20	April 16	Astros	—	—	—	—	—	–	—
21	April 17	Astros	—	—	—	—	—	–	—
22	April 18	Astros	—	—	—	—	—	–	—
23	April 19	@ Rangers	—	—	—	—	—	–	—
24	April 20	@ Rangers	—	—	—	—	—	–	—
25	April 21	@ Rangers	—	—	—	—	—	–	—
26	April 22	@ Athletics	—	—	—	—	—	–	—
27	April 23	@ Athletics	—	—	—	—	—	–	—
28	April 24	@ Athletics	—	—	—	—	—	–	—
29	April 25	@ Athletics	—	—	—	—	—	–	—
30	April 26	@ Giants	—	—	—	—	—	–	—
31	April 27	@ Giants	—	—	—	—	—	–	—
32	April 28	@ Giants	—	—	—	—	—	–	—
33	April 30	Twins	—	—	—	—	—	–	—

May: 0–0 (Home: 0–0; Road: 0–0)

#	Date	Opponent	Score	Win	Loss	Save	Attendance	Record	Streak
34	May 1	Twins	—	—	—	—	—	–	—
35	May 2	Twins	—	—	—	—	—	–	—
36	May 3	Dodgers	—	—	—	—	—	–	—
37	May 4	Dodgers	—	—	—	—	—	–	—
38	May 5	Dodgers	—	—	—	—	—	–	—
39	May 7	@ Cubs	—	—	—	—	—	–	—
40	May 8	@ Cubs	—	—	—	—	—	–	—
41	May 9	@ Cubs	—	—	—	—	—	–	—
42	May 10	@ Angels	—	—	—	—	—	–	—
43	May 11	@ Angels	—	—	—	—	—	–	—
44	May 12	@ Angels	—	—	—	—	—	–	—
45	May 14	Pirates	—	—	—	—	—	–	—
46	May 15	Pirates	—	—	—	—	—	–	—
47	May 16	Pirates	—	—	—	—	—	–	—
48	May 17	@ Diamondbacks	—	—	—	—	—	–	—
49	May 18	@ Diamondbacks	—	—	—	—	—	–	—
50	May 19	@ Diamondbacks	—	—	—	—	—	–	—
51	May 21	Rays	—	—	—	—	—	–	—
52	May 22	Rays	—	—	—	—	—	–	—
53	May 23	Rays	—	—	—	—	—	–	—
54	May 24	Athletics	—	—	—	—	—	–	—
55	May 25	Athletics	—	—	—	—	—	–	—
56	May 26	Athletics	—	—	—	—	—	–	—
57	May 28	@ White Sox	—	—	—	—	—	–	—
58	May 29	@ White Sox	—	—	—	—	—	–	—
59	May 30	@ White Sox	—	—	—	—	—	–	—
60	May 31	@ Astros	—	—	—	—	—	–	—

June: 0–0 (Home: 0–0; Road: 0–0)

#	Date	Opponent	Score	Win	Loss	Save	Attendance	Record	Streak
61	June 1	@ Astros	—	—	—	—	—	–	—
62	June 2	@ Astros	—	—	—	—	—	–	—
63	June 3	@ Astros	—	—	—	—	—	–	—
64	June 4	Nationals	—	—	—	—	—	–	—
65	June 5	Nationals	—	—	—	—	—	–	—
66	June 6	Nationals	—	—	—	—	—	–	—
67	June 7	Cardinals	—	—	—	—	—	–	—
68	June 8	Cardinals	—	—	—	—	—	–	—
69	June 9	Cardinals	—	—	—	—	—	–	—
70	June 11	@ Reds	—	—	—	—	—	–	—
71	June 12	@ Reds	—	—	—	—	—	–	—
72	June 13	@ Reds	—	—	—	—	—	–	—
73	June 14	@ Tigers	—	—	—	—	—	–	—
74	June 15	@ Tigers	—	—	—	—	—	–	—
75	June 16	@ Tigers	—	—	—	—	—	–	—
76	June 17	Angels	—	—	—	—	—	–	—
77	June 18	Angels	—	—	—	—	—	–	—
78	June 19	Angels	—	—	—	—	—	–	—
79	June 20	Angels	—	—	—	—	—	–	—
80	June 21	Marlins	—	—	—	—	—	–	—
81	June 22	Marlins	—	—	—	—	—	–	—
82	June 23	Marlins	—	—	—	—	—	–	—
83	June 25	@ Astros	—	—	—	—	—	–	—
84	June 26	@ Astros	—	—	—	—	—	–	—
85	June 27	@ Astros	—	—	—	—	—	–	—
86	June 28	@ Yankees	—	—	—	—	—	–	—
87	June 29	@ Yankees	—	—	—	—	—	–	—
88	June 30	@ Yankees	—	—	—	—	—	–	—

July: 0–0 (Home: 0–0; Road: 0–0)

#	Date	Opponent	Score	Win	Loss	Save	Attendance	Record	Streak
89	July 1	@ Yankees	—	—	—	—	—	–	—
90	July 2	@ Phillies	—	—	—	—	—	–	—
91	July 3	@ Phillies	—	—	—	—	—	–	—
92	July 4	@ Phillies	—	—	—	—	—	–	—
93	July 6	Padres	—	—	—	—	—	–	—
94	July 7	Padres	—	—	—	—	—	–	—
95	July 8	Padres	—	—	—	—	—	–	—
96	July 9	Royals	—	—	—	—	—	–	—
97	July 10	Royals	—	—	—	—	—	–	—
98	July 11	Royals	—	—	—	—	—	–	—
**97th All-Star Game in Chicago, IL**
99	July 16	@ Padres	—	—	—	—	—	–	—
100	July 17	@ Padres	—	—	—	—	—	–	—
101	July 18	@ Padres	—	—	—	—	—	–	—
102	July 19	@ Royals	—	—	—	—	—	–	—
103	July 20	@ Royals	—	—	—	—	—	–	—
104	July 21	@ Royals	—	—	—	—	—	–	—
105	July 23	Yankees	—	—	—	—	—	–	—
106	July 24	Yankees	—	—	—	—	—	–	—
107	July 25	Yankees	—	—	—	—	—	–	—
108	July 27	Brewers	—	—	—	—	—	–	—
109	July 28	Brewers	—	—	—	—	—	–	—
110	July 29	Brewers	—	—	—	—	—	–	—
111	July 30	Orioles	—	—	—	—	—	–	—
112	July 31	Orioles	—	—	—	—	—	–	—

August: 0–0 (Home: 0–0; Road: 0–0)

#	Date	Opponent	Score	Win	Loss	Save	Attendance	Record	Streak
113	August 1	Orioles	—	—	—	—	—	–	—
114	August 3	@ Braves	—	—	—	—	—	–	—
115	August 4	@ Braves	—	—	—	—	—	–	—
116	August 5	@ Braves	—	—	—	—	—	–	—
117	August 6	@ Rays	—	—	—	—	—	–	—
118	August 7	@ Rays	—	—	—	—	—	–	—
119	August 8	@ Rays	—	—	—	—	—	–	—
120	August 9	Guardians	—	—	—	—	—	–	—
121	August 10	Guardians	—	—	—	—	—	–	—
122	August 11	Guardians	—	—	—	—	—	–	—
123	August 13	Tigers	—	—	—	—	—	–	—
124	August 14	Tigers	—	—	—	—	—	–	—
125	August 15	Tigers	—	—	—	—	—	–	—
126	August 16	Angels	—	—	—	—	—	–	—
127	August 17	Angels	—	—	—	—	—	–	—
128	August 18	Angels	—	—	—	—	—	–	—
129	August 20	@ Twins	—	—	—	—	—	–	—
130	August 21	@ Twins	—	—	—	—	—	–	—
131	August 22	@ Twins	—	—	—	—	—	–	—
132	August 23	@ Rangers	—	—	—	—	—	–	—
133	August 24	@ Rangers	—	—	—	—	—	–	—
134	August 25	@ Rangers	—	—	—	—	—	–	—
135	August 27	Astros	—	—	—	—	—	–	—
136	August 28	Astros	—	—	—	—	—	–	—
137	August 29	Astros	—	—	—	—	—	–	—
138	August 30	Athletics	—	—	—	—	—	–	—
139	August 31	Athletics	—	—	—	—	—	–	—

September: 0–0 (Home: 0–0; Road: 0–0)

#	Date	Opponent	Score	Win	Loss	Save	Attendance	Record	Streak
140	September 1	Athletics	—	—	—	—	—	–	—
141	September 3	@ Red Sox	—	—	—	—	—	–	—
142	September 4	@ Red Sox	—	—	—	—	—	–	—
143	September 5	@ Red Sox	—	—	—	—	—	–	—
144	September 6	@ Mets	—	—	—	—	—	–	—
145	September 7	@ Mets	—	—	—	—	—	–	—
146	September 8	@ Mets	—	—	—	—	—	–	—
147	September 10	@ Orioles	—	—	—	—	—	–	—
148	September 11	@ Orioles	—	—	—	—	—	–	—
149	September 12	@ Orioles	—	—	—	—	—	–	—
150	September 13	Rangers	—	—	—	—	—	–	—
151	September 14	Rangers	—	—	—	—	—	–	—
152	September 15	Rangers	—	—	—	—	—	–	—
153	September 16	Rangers	—	—	—	—	—	–	—
154	September 17	Blue Jays	—	—	—	—	—	–	—
155	September 18	Blue Jays	—	—	—	—	—	–	—
156	September 19	Blue Jays	—	—	—	—	—	–	—
157	September 21	@ Angels	—	—	—	—	—	–	—
158	September 22	@ Angels	—	—	—	—	—	–	—
159	September 23	@ Angels	—	—	—	—	—	–	—
160	September 24	@ Athletics	—	—	—	—	—	–	—
161	September 25	@ Athletics	—	—	—	—	—	–	—
162	September 26	@ Athletics	—	—	—	—	—	–	—

== Roster ==
Seattle Mariners 2027 spring training roster
40-man roster		Non-roster invitees	Coaches / other
Pitchers: 13 Kade Anderson; 83 Eduard Bazardo; 47 Matt Brash; 88 Cooper Criswell; 82 Nick Davila; 58 Seranthony Domínguez; 36 Logan Gilbert; 26 Emerson Hancock; 68 George Kirby; -- James McArthur; -- Isaac Mattson; 75 Andrés Muñoz; 49 Robinson Ortiz; 38 Michael Rucker; 55 Gabe Speier; 59 Troy Taylor; 54 Carlos Vargas; 43 Cole Wilcox; 22 Bryan Woo	Catchers: -- Willie MacIver; 5 Jhonny Pereda; 29 Cal Raleigh; Infielders: 14 Michael Arroyo; 1 Ryan Bliss; 33 Brendan Donovan; 4 Colt Emerson; -- Maikel García; 12 Josh Naylor; 76 Leo Rivas; 90 Brock Rodden; -- Michael Toglia; 2 Cole Young; Outfielders: -- Brennen Davis; -- Grant McCray; 99 Lázaro Montes; 44 Julio Rodríguez; Designated hitters: 8 Dominic Canzone	Pitchers: -- Bryce Conley; -- Stephen Nogosek	Manager: 18 Jason Kanzler; Coaches: 66 Fleming Baez (bullpen catcher); 40 Trent Blank (director of pitching strategy); 57 Carlos Cardoza (third base); 80 Danny Farquhar (assistant pitching); -- CJ Gillman (hitting); 11 Edgar Martínez (director of hitting strategy); 84 Jake McKinley (field coordinator); 60 Austin Nola (bullpen); 95 Justin Novak (bullpen catcher); -- Ed Paparella (hitting coordinator); -- Tanner Swanson (bench); 32 Pete Woodworth (pitching); Vacant (first base); Vacant (infield); 37 active, 0 inactive, 2 non-roster invitees; 7-, 10-, or 15-day injured list; * Not on active roster; ^{†} Suspended list; Roster, coaches, and NRIs updated November 20, 2026; Transactions • Depth chart; → All MLB rosters

== Farm system ==
Level	Team	League	Manager
AAA	Tacoma Rainiers	Pacific Coast League	
AA	Arkansas Travelers	Texas League	
High-A	Everett AquaSox	Northwest League	
A	Inland Empire 66ers	California League	
Rookie	ACL Mariners	Arizona Complex League	
Foreign Rookie	DSL Mariners	Dominican Summer League	
