= 2027 Houston Astros season =

66th season in Major League Baseball for the Houston Astros

2027 Houston Astros
- League: American League
- Division: West
- Ballpark: Daikin Park
- City: Houston, Texas
- Owners: Jim Crane
- General manager: Randy Flores
- Manager: Brad Ausmus
- Television: Space City Home Network (Todd Kalas, Kevin Eschenfelder, Geoff Blum, Jeff Bagwell, Julia Morales)
- Radio: KTRH 740 Weekday Night Games Sportstalk 790; Houston Astros Radio Network (Robert Ford, Steve Sparks, Geoff Blum, Michael Coffin); KLAT (Spanish) (Francisco Romero, Alex Treviño)
- Stats: ESPN.com; Baseball Reference

The 2027 Houston Astros season is scheduled to be the 66th season for the Major League Baseball (MLB) franchise located in Houston, Texas, their 63rd as the Astros, 15th in both the American League (AL) and AL West division, and 28th at Daikin Park. The Astros would enter the season as defending AL West division champion for the eighth time in ten seasons, and 15th division championship overall. Their season ended via sweep by the Chicago White Sox in the AL Wild Card Series. On October 30, 2026, the Astros named Randy Flores their 15th general manager, and, on November 11, Brad Ausmus as 26th manager.

The season is contingent on Major League Baseball (MLB) and the Major League Baseball Players Association (MLBPA) signing a new collective bargaining agreement (CBA). Without a new CBA, MLB is expected to lock out the players on December 2, 2026, until one is signed. If such a lockout extends indefinitely, the season could be postponed, shortened, or even cancelled.

Opening Day for the Astros is scheduled on March 25, 2027, at Daikin Park, where they host the Texas Rangers. The Astros' final game of the regular season would then take place at Angel Stadium on September 26, 2027, where they would be hosted by Los Angeles.

== Offseason ==
=== Summary ===
The Houston Astros concluded the 2026 campaign with an 81–81 record, as champions of the AL West division, one game ahead of the runners-up Texas Rangers, for their eighth AL West division title in 10 seasons, and 15th overall. In the AL Wild Card Series, they faced the Chicago White Sox for their third playoff matchup all-time. The White Sox swept the Astros, ending their season. Designated hitter Yordan Alvarez led the major leagues in each of batting (.316), on-base (.432), and slugging percentage (.601); additionally, he ranked second in the AL each with 42 home runs and 106 runs batted in (RBI). Thus, he became the 26th major leaguer to bat .300, score 100 runs, hit 30 doubles, 40 home runs, 100 RBI, and draw 100 base on balls in the same season, (Note: Also became second Astro following Jeff Bagwell (1999 and 2000). Criteria: Number of seasons player meets criteria, in the regular season, requiring Doubles ≥ 30 and Home Runs ≥ 40 and Runs Batted In ≥ 100 and Batting Average ≥ .300 and Runs ≥ 100 and Bases on Balls ≥ 100, sorted by descending instances.) as well as Houston's third batting champion, joining Jose Altuve and Yuli Gurriel. Meanwhile, first baseman Christian Walker received the fourth Gold Glove of his career.

The Astros' 2027 regular season schedule was released on July 16, 2026. Opening Day will be on March 25, 2027, at Daikin Park, where they host Texas. The season concludes on September 26, 2027, at Angel Stadium, where Los Angeles will host the Astros. On December 1, 2026, the collective bargaining agreement (CBA) between MLB and the MLB Players Association (MLBPA) will expire. The most recent agreement was settled following an owners' lockout of players, which ultimately delayed the start of the 2022 season by one week.

On October 14, 2026, the team announced that they would not offer manager Joe Espada a new contract for the 2027 season and a number of coaches would not be retained. Bench coach Omar Lopez was offered an opportunity to stay with the organization in a different capacity. Other coaches whom the team dismissed included Tony Perezchica (third base), Anthony Iapoce (assistant hitting), Tim Cossins (catching), Tommy Kawamura (gameplan coordinator) and Ethan Katz (assistant pitching). Meanwhile, Josh Miller (pitching), Dave Clark (first base), Victor Rodriguez (hitting) and Jason Bell (field coordinator) all remained.

On October 20, the Houston chapter of the Society for American Baseball Research (SABR) dedicated a historical marker of Colt Stadium, the Astros' first ballpark, where they played while they were first known as the Colt .45s. The marker was situated between Reliant Center and a parking lot.

The team hired Randy Flores as their 15th general manager on October 30, succeeding Dana Brown. Flores, a former major league pitcher, had been serving as an assistant GM since 2019 and scouting director since 2015 for the St. Louis Cardinals.

On November 11, 2026, Houston announced the hiring of Brad Ausmus as their 26th manager, succeeding Joe Espada. Ausmus was serving as bench coach for the New York Yankees. A former MLB catcher who played with Houston, he later managed the Detroit Tigers (2014 to 2017) and the Los Angeles Angels (2019).

=== Transactions ===
Free agents

Major League free agents

Following 2026 World Series
Bryan Abreu (RHP) $6.5 million (2026)	Unrestricted free agents Contracts expiring following World Series
Enyel De Los Santos (RHP) $2 million (2026)	Unrestricted free agents Contracts expiring following World Series
Steven Okert (LHP) $2.325 million (2026)	Unrestricted free agents Contracts expiring following World Series
Christian Vázquez (C) $1 million (2026)	Unrestricted free agents Contracts expiring following World Series
Daulton Varsho (CF) $11.3 million (2026)	Unrestricted free agents Contracts expiring following World Series
LaMonte Wade Jr. (LF) $1.5 million (2026)	Unrestricted free agents Contracts expiring following World Series
Tatsuya Imai (RHP) $18 million (2026)	Opt-out held (First of two player options)	$18.7 million (2027) Not exercised
Arbitration-phase players
Jake Meyers (CF) $3.55 million (2026)	Waived off 40-man roster Arb Year 3
Taylor Trammell (LF) $900,000 (2026)	Non tender Arb Year 1

Contract options

==== Contract options ====
Isaac Paredes (3B)^{Arb} $9.35 million (2026)	Team option held	$13.4 million (2027) Exercised
Ryan Weiss (RHP)^{Pre-arb} $2.6 million (2026)	Team option held	$5 million (2027) Declined w/$500K buyout

Arbitration-phase players

==== Arbitration-phase players ====
Player	Pos.	Arb.	2026 salary	Tendered	Hearing	Signed	2027 Salary	FA	Ref.
Peter Lambert	RHP	3	$1,500,000	Pending				2028	
Isaac Paredes (Note: Super-two player) (Note: $13.35M team option for 2027, convertible to mutual option contingent upon player ranking in top 10 of 2026 MVP vote)	3B	3	$9.350,000	Y	N	November 2	$13.35 million	2028	
Jeremy Peña	SS	3	$9,475,000	Pending				2028	
Jake Meyers	CF	3	$3,550,000	N	—	—	—	2027	
Hunter Brown	RHP	2	$5,170,000	Pending				2029	
Yainer Díaz	C	2	$4,500,000	Pending				2029	
Ronel Blanco	RHP	1	$802,700	Pending				2030	
Hayden Wesneski	RHP	1	$975,000	Pending				2030	
Bennett Sousa	LHP	1	$910,000	Y	N	November 20	$1.26 million	2030	
Nick Allen	IF	1	$1,400,000	Y	N	November 20	$1.95 million	2030	
Taylor Trammell	LF	1	$900,000	N	—	—	—	2027	
Description • Sources:

Executive and coaching

==== Management and coaching personnel ====
Predecessor	2027 organization	Role	Incumbent	2026 organization	Ref.
Charles Cook (Interim), Gavin Dickey (Interim), Connor Huff (Interim), Jeff Bagwell (Interim)	Houston Astros	General manager	Randy Flores	St. Louis Cardinals	
Joe Espada		Manager	Brad Ausmus	New York Yankees	
Omar López		Bench	Bobby Wilson	Washington Nationals	
Tony Perezchica		Third base	TBA		
Anthony Iapoce		Assistant hitting	TBA		
Ethan Katz	Colorado Rockies	Assistant pitching / bullpen	TBA		
Tim Cossins		Catching	TBA		
Tommy Kawamura		Gameplan coordinator	TBA		
Eric Niesen	Wake Forest	Director of pitching	Spencer Medick	New York Yankees	
Dan Hennigan	Wake Forest	Director of hitting	Connor Watson	Cleveland Guardians	
Jason Bell	Boston Red Sox	Field coordinator	TBA		

== Game log ==
The 2027 schedule is tentative until a new collective bargaining agreement (CBA) is signed between Major League Baseball (MLB) and the Major League Baseball Players Association (MLBPA). If the labor dispute extends into late February or early March, MLB would then start to consider whether to postpone or shorten the season.

=== Regular season ===
Past games legend
Astros Win (#bfb)	Astros Loss (#fbb)	Game postponed (#bbb)
Bold denotes an Astros pitcher

Future Games Legend
Home Game	Away Game

2027 Game Log
Total: 0–0 (Home: 0–0; Away: 0–0)
March/April: 0–0 (Home: 0–0; Away: 0–0)

#	Date	Opponent	Score	Win	Loss	Save	Location	Attendance	Record
1	March 25	Rangers	—	—	—	—	**Daikin Park**	—	0–0
2	March 26	Rangers	—	—	—	—	**Daikin Park**	—	0–0
3	March 27	Rangers	—	—	—	—	**Daikin Park**	—	0–0
4	March 29	Red Sox	—	—	—	—	**Daikin Park**	—	0–0
5	March 30	Red Sox	—	—	—	—	**Daikin Park**	—	0–0
6	March 31	Red Sox	—	—	—	—	**Daikin Park**	—	0–0
7	April 2	@ Braves	—	—	—	—	Truist Park	—	0–0
8	April 3	@ Braves	—	—	—	—	Truist Park	—	0–0
9	April 4	@ Braves	—	—	—	—	Truist Park	—	0–0
10	April 5	@ Red Sox	—	—	—	—	Fenway Park	—	0–0
11	April 6	@ Red Sox	—	—	—	—	Fenway Park	—	0–0
12	April 7	@ Red Sox	—	—	—	—	Fenway Park	—	0–0
13	April 9	Guardians	—	—	—	—	**Daikin Park**	—	0–0
14	April 10	Guardians	—	—	—	—	**Daikin Park**	—	0–0
15	April 11	Guardians	—	—	—	—	**Daikin Park**	—	0–0
16	April 13	Blue Jays	—	—	—	—	**Daikin Park**	—	0–0
17	April 14	Blue Jays	—	—	—	—	**Daikin Park**	—	0–0
18	April 15	Blue Jays	—	—	—	—	**Daikin Park**	—	0–0
19	April 16	@ Mariners	—	—	—	—	T-Mobile Park	—	0–0
20	April 17	@ Mariners	—	—	—	—	T-Mobile Park	—	0–0
21	April 18	@ Mariners	—	—	—	—	T-Mobile Park	—	0–0
22	April 19	@ Angels	—	—	—	—	Angel Stadium	—	0–0
23	April 20	@ Angels	—	—	—	—	Angel Stadium	—	0–0
24	April 21	@ Angels	—	—	—	—	Angel Stadium	—	0–0
25	April 23	Yankees	—	—	—	—	**Daikin Park**	—	0–0
26	April 24	Yankees	—	—	—	—	**Daikin Park**	—	0–0
27	April 25	Yankees	—	—	—	—	**Daikin Park**	—	0–0
28	April 26	Angels	—	—	—	—	**Daikin Park**	—	0–0
29	April 27	Angels	—	—	—	—	**Daikin Park**	—	0–0
30	April 28	Angels	—	—	—	—	**Daikin Park**	—	0–0
31	April 30	@ Marlins	—	—	—	—	LoanDepot Park	—	0–0

May: 0–0 (Home: 0–0; Away: 0–0)

#	Date	Opponent	Score	Win	Loss	Save	Location	Attendance	Record
32	May 1	@ Marlins	—	—	—	—	LoanDepot Park	—	0–0
33	May 2	@ Marlins	—	—	—	—	LoanDepot Park	—	0–0
34	May 3	@ Rangers	—	—	—	—	Globe Life Field	—	0–0
35	May 4	@ Rangers	—	—	—	—	Globe Life Field	—	0–0
36	May 5	@ Rangers	—	—	—	—	Globe Life Field	—	0–0
37	May 6	@ Rangers	—	—	—	—	Globe Life Field	—	0–0
38	May 7	Nationals	—	—	—	—	**Daikin Park**	—	0–0
39	May 8	Nationals	—	—	—	—	**Daikin Park**	—	0–0
40	May 9	Nationals	—	—	—	—	**Daikin Park**	—	0–0
41	May 10	@ Twins	—	—	—	—	Target Field	—	0–0
42	May 11	@ Twins	—	—	—	—	Target Field	—	0–0
43	May 12	@ Twins	—	—	—	—	Target Field	—	0–0
44	May 14	Cubs	—	—	—	—	**Daikin Park**	—	0–0
45	May 15	Cubs	—	—	—	—	**Daikin Park**	—	0–0
46	May 16	Cubs	—	—	—	—	**Daikin Park**	—	0–0
47	May 17	Rays	—	—	—	—	**Daikin Park**	—	0–0
48	May 18	Rays	—	—	—	—	**Daikin Park**	—	0–0
49	May 19	Rays	—	—	—	—	**Daikin Park**	—	0–0
50	May 20	@ Athletics	—	—	—	—	Sutter Health Park	—	0–0
51	May 21	@ Athletics	—	—	—	—	Sutter Health Park	—	0–0
52	May 22	@ Athletics	—	—	—	—	Sutter Health Park	—	0–0
53	May 23	@ Athletics	—	—	—	—	Sutter Health Park	—	0–0
54	May 25	@ Rockies	—	—	—	—	Coors Field	—	0–0
55	May 26	@ Rockies	—	—	—	—	Coors Field	—	0–0
56	May 27	@ Rockies	—	—	—	—	Coors Field	—	0–0
57	May 28	Athletics	—	—	—	—	**Daikin Park**	—	0–0
58	May 29	Athletics	—	—	—	—	**Daikin Park**	—	0–0
59	May 30	Athletics	—	—	—	—	**Daikin Park**	—	0–0
60	May 31	Mariners	—	—	—	—	**Daikin Park**	—	0–0

June: 0–0 (Home: 0–0; Away: 0–0)

#	Date	Opponent	Score	Win	Loss	Save	Location	Attendance	Record
61	June 1	Mariners	—	—	—	—	**Daikin Park**	—	0–0
62	June 2	Mariners	—	—	—	—	**Daikin Park**	—	0–0
63	June 3	Mariners	—	—	—	—	**Daikin Park**	—	0–0
64	June 4	@ Rays	—	—	—	—	Tropicana Field	—	0–0
65	June 5	@ Rays	—	—	—	—	Tropicana Field	—	0–0
66	June 6	@ Rays	—	—	—	—	Tropicana Field	—	0–0
67	June 8	@ Pirates	—	—	—	—	PNC Park	—	0–0
68	June 9	@ Pirates	—	—	—	—	PNC Park	—	0–0
69	June 10	@ Pirates	—	—	—	—	PNC Park	—	0–0
70	June 11	@ Tigers	—	—	—	—	Fifth Third Park	—	0–0
71	June 12	@ Tigers	—	—	—	—	Fifth Third Park	—	0–0
72	June 13	@ Tigers	—	—	—	—	Fifth Third Park	—	0–0
73	June 14	White Sox	—	—	—	—	**Daikin Park**	—	0–0
74	June 15	White Sox	—	—	—	—	**Daikin Park**	—	0–0
75	June 16	White Sox	—	—	—	—	**Daikin Park**	—	0–0
76	June 18	Royals	—	—	—	—	**Daikin Park**	—	0–0
77	June 19	Royals	—	—	—	—	**Daikin Park**	—	0–0
78	June 20	Royals	—	—	—	—	**Daikin Park**	—	0–0
79	June 21	@ Guardians	—	—	—	—	Progressive Field	—	0–0
80	June 22	@ Guardians	—	—	—	—	Progressive Field	—	0–0
81	June 23	@ Guardians	—	—	—	—	Progressive Field	—	0–0
82	June 25	Mariners	—	—	—	—	**Daikin Park**	—	0–0
83	June 26	Mariners	—	—	—	—	**Daikin Park**	—	0–0
84	June 27	Mariners	—	—	—	—	**Daikin Park**	—	0–0
85	June 28	@ Royals	—	—	—	—	Kauffman Stadium	—	0–0
86	June 29	@ Royals	—	—	—	—	Kauffman Stadium	—	0–0
87	June 30	@ Royals	—	—	—	—	Kauffman Stadium	—	0–0

July: 0–0 (Home: 0–0; Away: 0–0)

#	Date	Opponent	Score	Win	Loss	Save	Location	Attendance	Record
88	July 1	@ Royals	—	—	—	—	Kauffman Stadium	—	0–0
89	July 2	@ Yankees	—	—	—	—	Yankee Stadium	—	0–0
90	July 3	@ Yankees	—	—	—	—	Yankee Stadium	—	0–0
91	July 4	@ Yankees	—	—	—	—	Yankee Stadium	—	0–0
92	July 6	Reds	—	—	—	—	**Daikin Park**	—	0–0
93	July 7	Reds	—	—	—	—	**Daikin Park**	—	0–0
94	July 8	Reds	—	—	—	—	**Daikin Park**	—	0–0
95	July 9	Giants	—	—	—	—	**Daikin Park**	—	0–0
96	July 10	Giants	—	—	—	—	**Daikin Park**	—	0–0
97	July 11	Giants	—	—	—	—	**Daikin Park**	—	0–0
**97th All-Star Game in Chicago, Illinois**
98	July 16	@ Rangers	—	—	—	—	Globe Life Field	—	0–0
99	July 17	@ Rangers	—	—	—	—	Globe Life Field	—	0–0
100	July 18	@ Rangers	—	—	—	—	Globe Life Field	—	0–0
101	July 19	@ Orioles	—	—	—	—	Camden Yards	—	0–0
102	July 20	@ Orioles	—	—	—	—	Camden Yards	—	0–0
103	July 21	@ Orioles	—	—	—	—	Camden Yards	—	0–0
104	July 23	Rockies	—	—	—	—	**Daikin Park**	—	0–0
105	July 24	Rockies	—	—	—	—	**Daikin Park**	—	0–0
106	July 25	Rockies	—	—	—	—	**Daikin Park**	—	0–0
107	July 26	Tigers	—	—	—	—	**Daikin Park**	—	0–0
108	July 27	Tigers	—	—	—	—	**Daikin Park**	—	0–0
109	July 28	Tigers	—	—	—	—	**Daikin Park**	—	0–0
110	July 29	Tigers	—	—	—	—	**Daikin Park**	—	0–0
111	July 30	Padres	—	—	—	—	**Daikin Park**	—	0–0
112	July 31	Padres	—	—	—	—	**Daikin Park**	—	0–0

August: 0–0 (Home: 0–0; Away: 0–0)

#	Date	Opponent	Score	Win	Loss	Save	Location	Attendance	Record
113	August 1	Padres	—	—	—	—	**Daikin Park**	—	0–0
114	August 3	@ Dodgers	—	—	—	—	Dodger Stadium	—	0–0
115	August 4	@ Dodgers	—	—	—	—	Dodger Stadium	—	0–0
116	August 5	@ Dodgers	—	—	—	—	Dodger Stadium	—	0–0
117	August 6	@ Diamondbacks	—	—	—	—	Chase Field	—	0–0
118	August 7	@ Diamondbacks	—	—	—	—	Chase Field	—	0–0
119	August 8	@ Diamondbacks	—	—	—	—	Chase Field	—	0–0
120	August 10	Orioles	—	—	—	—	**Daikin Park**	—	0–0
121	August 11	Orioles	—	—	—	—	**Daikin Park**	—	0–0
122	August 12	Orioles	—	—	—	—	**Daikin Park**	—	0–0
123	August 13	Twins	—	—	—	—	**Daikin Park**	—	0–0
124	August 14	Twins	—	—	—	—	**Daikin Park**	—	0–0
125	August 15	Twins	—	—	—	—	**Daikin Park**	—	0–0
126	August 17	Mets	—	—	—	—	**Daikin Park**	—	0–0
127	August 18	Mets	—	—	—	—	**Daikin Park**	—	0–0
128	August 19	Mets	—	—	—	—	**Daikin Park**	—	0–0
129	August 20	@ Brewers	—	—	—	—	American Family Field	—	0–0
130	August 21	@ Brewers	—	—	—	—	American Family Field	—	0–0
131	August 22	@ Brewers	—	—	—	—	American Family Field	—	0–0
132	August 24	@ White Sox	—	—	—	—	Rate Field	—	0–0
133	August 25	@ White Sox	—	—	—	—	Rate Field	—	0–0
134	August 26	@ White Sox	—	—	—	—	Rate Field	—	0–0
135	August 27	@ Mariners	—	—	—	—	T-Mobile Park	—	0–0
136	August 28	@ Mariners	—	—	—	—	T-Mobile Park	—	0–0
137	August 29	@ Mariners	—	—	—	—	T-Mobile Park	—	0–0
138	August 31	Rangers	—	—	—	—	**Daikin Park**	—	0–0

September: 0–0 (Home: 0–0; Away: 0–0)

#	Date	Opponent	Score	Win	Loss	Save	Location	Attendance	Record
139	September 1	Rangers	—	—	—	—	**Daikin Park**	—	0–0
140	September 2	Rangers	—	—	—	—	**Daikin Park**	—	0–0
141	September 3	Athletics	—	—	—	—	**Daikin Park**	—	0–0
142	September 4	Athletics	—	—	—	—	**Daikin Park**	—	0–0
143	September 5	Athletics	—	—	—	—	**Daikin Park**	—	0–0
144	September 6	@ Cardinals	—	—	—	—	Busch Stadium	—	0–0
145	September 7	@ Cardinals	—	—	—	—	Busch Stadium	—	0–0
146	September 8	@ Cardinals	—	—	—	—	Busch Stadium	—	0–0
147	September 10	@ Blue Jays	—	—	—	—	Rogers Centre	—	0–0
148	September 11	@ Blue Jays	—	—	—	—	Rogers Centre	—	0–0
149	September 12	@ Blue Jays	—	—	—	—	Rogers Centre	—	0–0
150	September 13	Angels	—	—	—	—	**Daikin Park**	—	0–0
151	September 14	Angels	—	—	—	—	**Daikin Park**	—	0–0
152	September 15	Angels	—	—	—	—	**Daikin Park**	—	0–0
153	September 16	Angels	—	—	—	—	**Daikin Park**	—	0–0
154	September 17	Phillies	—	—	—	—	**Daikin Park**	—	0–0
155	September 18	Phillies	—	—	—	—	**Daikin Park**	—	0–0
156	September 19	Phillies	—	—	—	—	**Daikin Park**	—	0–0
157	September 21	@ Athletics	—	—	—	—	Sutter Health Park	—	0–0
158	September 22	@ Athletics	—	—	—	—	Sutter Health Park	—	0–0
159	September 23	@ Athletics	—	—	—	—	Sutter Health Park	—	0–0
160	September 24	@ Angels	—	—	—	—	Angel Stadium	—	0–0
161	September 25	@ Angels	—	—	—	—	Angel Stadium	—	0–0
162	September 26	@ Angels	—	—	—	—	Angel Stadium	—	0–0

== Roster ==
Houston Astros 2027 spring training roster
40-man roster		Non-roster invitees	Coaches / other
Pitchers: 56 Ronel Blanco; 69 AJ Blubaugh; 58 Hunter Brown; 50 Mike Burrows; 71 Josh Hader; 61 Josh Hendrickson; 45 Tatsuya Imai; 53 Cristian Javier; 74 Bryan King; 38 Peter Lambert; -- Roddery Muñoz; -- Jackson Nezuh; 70 Ethan Pecko; -- Evan Reifert; 72 Alimber Santa; 62 Bennett Sousa; 66 Miguel Ullola; 17 Kai-Wei Teng; 64 Logan VanWey; 60 Brandon Walter; 39 Hayden Wesneski	Catchers: 21 Yainer Díaz; 37 Collin Price; -- César Salazar; Infielders: 20 Nick Allen; 27 Jose Altuve; 1 Carlos Correa; 29 Raynel Delgado; 15 Isaac Paredes; 3 Jeremy Peña; 8 Christian Walker; Outfielders: 14 Jorge Barrosa; 16 Zach Cole; 9 Zach Dezenzo; 0 Brice Matthews; 11 Cam Smith; 28 Lucas Spence; Designated hitters: 44 Yordan Alvarez		Manager: 12 Brad Ausmus; Coaches: 85 Javier Bracamonte (bullpen catcher); 23 Dave Clark (first base); 36 Josh Miller (pitching); 47 Victor Rodriguez (hitting); Vacant (bench); Vacant (third base); 38 active, 0 inactive, 0 non-roster invitees; 7-, 10-, or 15-day injured list; * Not on active roster; ^{†} Suspended list; Roster, coaches, and NRIs updated November 20, 2026; Transactions • Depth chart; → All MLB rosters

== Minor league system ==
=== Teams ===
Level	Team	League	Manager
AAA	Sugar Land Space Cowboys	Pacific Coast League	
AA	Corpus Christi Hooks	Texas League	
High-A	Asheville Tourists	South Atlantic League	
Low-A	Fayetteville Woodpeckers	Carolina League	
Rookie	FCL Astros	Florida Complex League |	
Rookie	DSL Astros Blue	Dominican Summer League	
Rookie	DSL Astros Orange	Dominican Summer League	
