= 2027 Colorado Rockies season =

2027 Colorado Rockies
- League: National League
- Division: West
- Ballpark: Coors Field
- City: Denver, Colorado
- Owners: Charles & Richard Monfort
- President of baseball operations: Paul DePodesta
- General manager: Josh Byrnes
- Manager: Warren Schaeffer
- Television: MLB Local Media
- Radio: KOA (English); KNRV (Spanish)
- Stats: ESPN.com; Baseball Reference

The 2027 Colorado Rockies season is scheduled to be their 35th in Major League Baseball and their 33rd season at Coors Field.

The season is contingent on Major League Baseball (MLB) and the Major League Baseball Players Association (MLBPA) signing a new collective bargaining agreement (CBA). Without a new CBA, MLB is expected to lock out the players on December 2, 2026, until one is signed. If such a lockout extends indefinitely, the season could be postponed, shortened, or even cancelled.

== Offseason ==
=== Front office ===
On November 22, 2026, the Rockies hired Scott Servais as their senior director of baseball operations.

=== Coaching ===
On October 16, 2026, the Rockies parted ways with pitching coach Alon Leichman. On November 2, Ethan Katz was announced as his replacement. On November 4, they hired Andre Lipcius as a game planning coach.

=== Transactions ===
==== October ====
- October 29: RHP Jordan Romano, LHP Kyle Freeland, RHP Tomoyuki Sugano, and LHP José Quintana elected free agency.

==== November ====
- November 2: Sent 2B Chad Stevens, RHP TJ Shook, RHP Blake Adams, and RHP Eiberson Castellano outright to AAA Albuquerque. Activated DH Kris Bryant, RHP Chase Dollander, LHP Welinton Herrera, RHP RJ Petit, and RHP McCade Brown from the 60-day IL. RHP Pierson Ohl claimed off waivers by the New York Mets.
- November 3: RHP RJ Petit returned to the Detroit Tigers.
- November 17: Selected the contracts of RHP Jack Mahoney, C Bryant Betancourt, and RHP Jackson Cox from AAA Albuquerque.
- November 19: Traded LHP Sean Sullivan and C Douglas Veliz to the Chicago White Sox for RHP Luis Castillo and RHP Davis Martin.
- November 20: Traded cash considerations to the Toronto Blue Jays for RHP Chase Lee. Designated RHP Jimmy Herget for assignment. RHP Jimmy Herget elected free agency.

== Game log ==
The 2027 schedule is tentative until a new collective bargaining agreement (CBA) is signed between Major League Baseball (MLB) and the Major League Baseball Players Association (MLBPA). If the labor dispute extends into late February or early March, MLB would then start to consider whether to postpone or shorten the season.

Legend
	Rockies win
	Rockies loss
	Postponement
**Bold**	Rockies team member

2027 Game Log: 0–0 (Home: 0–0; Road: 0–0)
March/April: 0–0 (Home: 0–0; Road: 0–0)

#	Date	Opponent	Score	Win	Loss	Save	Attendance	Record	Streak
1	March 25	@ Giants	—	—	—	—	—	–	—
2	March 27	@ Giants	—	—	—	—	—	–	—
3	March 28	@ Giants	—	—	—	—	—	–	—
4	March 29	@ Padres	—	—	—	—	—	–	—
5	March 30	@ Padres	—	—	—	—	—	–	—
6	March 31	@ Padres	—	—	—	—	—	–	—
7	April 1	Dodgers	—	—	—	—	—	–	—
8	April 2	Dodgers	—	—	—	—	—	–	—
9	April 3	Dodgers	—	—	—	—	—	–	—
10	April 4	Dodgers	—	—	—	—	—	–	—
11	April 5	Marlins	—	—	—	—	—	–	—
12	April 6	Marlins	—	—	—	—	—	–	—
13	April 7	Marlins	—	—	—	—	—	–	—
14	April 9	@ Mariners	—	—	—	—	—	–	—
15	April 10	@ Mariners	—	—	—	—	—	–	—
16	April 11	@ Mariners	—	—	—	—	—	–	—
17	April 13	@ Dodgers	—	—	—	—	—	–	—
18	April 14	@ Dodgers	—	—	—	—	—	–	—
19	April 15	@ Dodgers	—	—	—	—	—	–	—
20	April 16	Mets	—	—	—	—	—	–	—
21	April 17	Mets	—	—	—	—	—	–	—
22	April 18	Mets	—	—	—	—	—	–	—
23	April 20	Padres	—	—	—	—	—	–	—
24	April 21	Padres	—	—	—	—	—	–	—
25	April 22	Padres	—	—	—	—	—	–	—
26	April 23	@ Brewers	—	—	—	—	—	–	—
27	April 24	@ Brewers	—	—	—	—	—	–	—
28	April 25	@ Brewers	—	—	—	—	—	–	—
29	April 26	@ Guardians	—	—	—	—	—	–	—
30	April 27	@ Guardians	—	—	—	—	—	–	—
31	April 28	@ Guardians	—	—	—	—	—	–	—
32	April 30	Athletics	—	—	—	—	—	–	—

May: 0–0 (Home: 0–0; Road: 0–0)

#	Date	Opponent	Score	Win	Loss	Save	Attendance	Record	Streak
33	May 1	Athletics	—	—	—	—	—	–	—
34	May 2	Athletics	—	—	—	—	—	–	—
35	May 3	Tigers	—	—	—	—	—	–	—
36	May 4	Tigers	—	—	—	—	—	–	—
37	May 5	Tigers	—	—	—	—	—	–	—
38	May 7	@ Reds	—	—	—	—	—	–	—
39	May 8	@ Reds	—	—	—	—	—	–	—
40	May 9	@ Reds	—	—	—	—	—	–	—
41	May 11	@ Nationals	—	—	—	—	—	–	—
42	May 12	@ Nationals	—	—	—	—	—	–	—
43	May 13	@ Nationals	—	—	—	—	—	–	—
44	May 14	Twins	—	—	—	—	—	–	—
45	May 15	Twins	—	—	—	—	—	–	—
46	May 16	Twins	—	—	—	—	—	–	—
47	May 17	Pirates	—	—	—	—	—	–	—
48	May 18	Pirates	—	—	—	—	—	–	—
49	May 19	Pirates	—	—	—	—	—	–	—
50	May 20	@ Diamondbacks	—	—	—	—	—	–	—
51	May 21	@ Diamondbacks	—	—	—	—	—	–	—
52	May 22	@ Diamondbacks	—	—	—	—	—	–	—
53	May 23	@ Diamondbacks	—	—	—	—	—	–	—
54	May 25	Astros	—	—	—	—	—	–	—
55	May 26	Astros	—	—	—	—	—	–	—
56	May 27	Astros	—	—	—	—	—	–	—
57	May 28	@ Orioles	—	—	—	—	—	–	—
58	May 29	@ Orioles	—	—	—	—	—	–	—
59	May 30	@ Orioles	—	—	—	—	—	–	—
60	May 31	@ Braves	—	—	—	—	—	–	—

June: 0–0 (Home: 0–0; Road: 0–0)

#	Date	Opponent	Score	Win	Loss	Save	Attendance	Record	Streak
61	June 1	@ Braves	—	—	—	—	—	–	—
62	June 2	@ Braves	—	—	—	—	—	–	—
63	June 4	Cardinals	—	—	—	—	—	–	—
64	June 5	Cardinals	—	—	—	—	—	–	—
65	June 6	Cardinals	—	—	—	—	—	–	—
66	June 7	Braves	—	—	—	—	—	–	—
67	June 8	Braves	—	—	—	—	—	–	—
68	June 9	Braves	—	—	—	—	—	–	—
69	June 11	@ Cubs	—	—	—	—	—	–	—
70	June 12	@ Cubs	—	—	—	—	—	–	—
71	June 13	@ Cubs	—	—	—	—	—	–	—
72	June 14	@ Rangers	—	—	—	—	—	–	—
73	June 15	@ Rangers	—	—	—	—	—	–	—
74	June 16	@ Rangers	—	—	—	—	—	–	—
75	June 18	Cubs	—	—	—	—	—	–	—
76	June 19	Cubs	—	—	—	—	—	–	—
77	June 20	Cubs	—	—	—	—	—	–	—
78	June 21	Diamondbacks	—	—	—	—	—	–	—
79	June 22	Diamondbacks	—	—	—	—	—	–	—
80	June 23	Diamondbacks	—	—	—	—	—	–	—
81	June 25	@ Red Sox	—	—	—	—	—	–	—
82	June 26	@ Red Sox	—	—	—	—	—	–	—
83	June 27	@ Red Sox	—	—	—	—	—	–	—
84	June 29	@ Phillies	—	—	—	—	—	–	—
85	June 30	@ Phillies	—	—	—	—	—	–	—

July: 0–0 (Home: 0–0; Road: 0–0)

#	Date	Opponent	Score	Win	Loss	Save	Attendance	Record	Streak
86	July 1	@ Phillies	—	—	—	—	—	–	—
87	July 2	Blue Jays	—	—	—	—	—	–	—
88	July 3	Blue Jays	—	—	—	—	—	–	—
89	July 4	Blue Jays	—	—	—	—	—	–	—
90	July 6	Giants	—	—	—	—	—	–	—
91	July 7	Giants	—	—	—	—	—	–	—
92	July 8	Giants	—	—	—	—	—	–	—
93	July 9	Padres	—	—	—	—	—	–	—
94	July 10 (1)	Padres	—	—	—	—	—	–	—
95	July 10 (2)	Padres	—	—	—	—	—	–	—
96	July 11	Padres	—	—	—	—	—	–	—
–	July 13	**97th All-Star Game in Chicago, IL**							
97	July 16	@ Diamondbacks	—	—	—	—	—	–	—
98	July 17	@ Diamondbacks	—	—	—	—	—	–	—
99	July 18	@ Diamondbacks	—	—	—	—	—	–	—
100	July 19	@ Giants	—	—	—	—	—	–	—
101	July 20	@ Giants	—	—	—	—	—	–	—
102	July 21	@ Giants	—	—	—	—	—	–	—
103	July 22	@ Giants	—	—	—	—	—	–	—
104	July 23	@ Astros	—	—	—	—	—	–	—
105	July 24	@ Astros	—	—	—	—	—	–	—
106	July 25	@ Astros	—	—	—	—	—	–	—
107	July 26	Yankees	—	—	—	—	—	–	—
108	July 27	Yankees	—	—	—	—	—	–	—
109	July 28	Yankees	—	—	—	—	—	–	—
110	July 30	Brewers	—	—	—	—	—	–	—
111	July 31	Brewers	—	—	—	—	—	–	—

August: 0–0 (Home: 0–0; Road: 0–0)

#	Date	Opponent	Score	Win	Loss	Save	Attendance	Record	Streak
112	August 1	Brewers	—	—	—	—	—	–	—
113	August 3	@ Royals	—	—	—	—	—	–	—
114	August 4	@ Royals	—	—	—	—	—	–	—
115	August 5	@ Royals	—	—	—	—	—	–	—
116	August 6	@ Cardinals	—	—	—	—	—	–	—
117	August 7	@ Cardinals	—	—	—	—	—	–	—
118	August 8	@ Cardinals	—	—	—	—	—	–	—
119	August 9	Phillies	—	—	—	—	—	–	—
120	August 10	Phillies	—	—	—	—	—	–	—
121	August 11	Phillies	—	—	—	—	—	–	—
122	August 12	Phillies	—	—	—	—	—	–	—
123	August 13	White Sox	—	—	—	—	—	–	—
124	August 14	White Sox	—	—	—	—	—	–	—
125	August 15	White Sox	—	—	—	—	—	–	—
126	August 16	@ Dodgers	—	—	—	—	—	–	—
127	August 17	@ Dodgers	—	—	—	—	—	–	—
128	August 18	@ Dodgers	—	—	—	—	—	–	—
129	August 20	Diamondbacks	—	—	—	—	—	–	—
130	August 21	Diamondbacks	—	—	—	—	—	–	—
131	August 22	Diamondbacks	—	—	—	—	—	–	—
132	August 24	@ Mets	—	—	—	—	—	–	—
133	August 25	@ Mets	—	—	—	—	—	–	—
134	August 26	@ Mets	—	—	—	—	—	–	—
135	August 27	@ Pirates	—	—	—	—	—	–	—
136	August 28	@ Pirates	—	—	—	—	—	–	—
137	August 29	@ Pirates	—	—	—	—	—	–	—
138	August 31	Angels	—	—	—	—	—	–	—

September: 0–0 (Home: 0–0; Road: 0–0)

#	Date	Opponent	Score	Win	Loss	Save	Attendance	Record	Streak
139	September 1	Angels	—	—	—	—	—	–	—
140	September 2	Angels	—	—	—	—	—	–	—
141	September 3	@ Padres	—	—	—	—	—	–	—
142	September 4	@ Padres	—	—	—	—	—	–	—
143	September 5	@ Padres	—	—	—	—	—	–	—
144	September 6	Reds	—	—	—	—	—	–	—
145	September 7	Reds	—	—	—	—	—	–	—
146	September 8	Reds	—	—	—	—	—	–	—
147	September 10	Nationals	—	—	—	—	—	–	—
148	September 11	Nationals	—	—	—	—	—	–	—
149	September 12	Nationals	—	—	—	—	—	–	—
150	September 14	@ Marlins	—	—	—	—	—	–	—
151	September 15	@ Marlins	—	—	—	—	—	–	—
152	September 16	@ Marlins	—	—	—	—	—	–	—
153	September 17	@ Rays	—	—	—	—	—	–	—
154	September 18	@ Rays	—	—	—	—	—	–	—
155	September 19	@ Rays	—	—	—	—	—	–	—
156	September 21	Dodgers	—	—	—	—	—	–	—
157	September 22	Dodgers	—	—	—	—	—	–	—
158	September 23	Dodgers	—	—	—	—	—	–	—
159	September 24	Giants	—	—	—	—	—	–	—
160	September 25	Giants	—	—	—	—	—	–	—
161	September 26	Giants	—	—	—	—	—	–	—

== Roster ==
Colorado Rockies 2027 spring training roster
40-man roster		Non-roster invitees	Coaches / other
Pitchers: 38 Mason Adams; 36 Zach Agnos; 83 Brennan Bernardino; 51 McCade Brown; 63 Blas Castaño; -- Luis Castillo; -- Jackson Cox; 46 Jeff Criswell; 32 Chase Dollander; 18 Ryan Feltner; 41 Nick Frasso; 29 Tanner Gordon; -- Hayden Harris; 59 Welinton Herrera; 0 Jaden Hill; 43 Gabriel Hughes; -- Chase Lee; -- Jack Mahoney; 54 Mark Manfredi; -- Davis Martin; 47 Juan Mejía	Catchers: -- Bryant Betancourt; 37 Braxton Fulford; 15 Hunter Goodman; 26 Brett Sullivan; Infielders: 1 Adael Amador; 3 Willi Castro; 12 Kyle Karros; 35 Connor Norby; 8 Ryan Ritter; 7 T. J. Rumfield; 14 Ezequiel Tovar; Outfielders: 27 Jordan Beck; 16 Cole Carrigg; 20 Troy Johnston; 31 Jake McCarthy; 22 Mickey Moniak; 30 Sterlin Thompson; 13 Zac Veen; Designated hitters: 23 Kris Bryant	Pitchers: -- TJ Shook	Manager: 4 Warren Schaeffer; Coaches: 50 Doug Bernier (first base/outfield); 73 Matt Buschmann (bullpen); 75 Kyle Cunningham (asst. bullpen catcher); 53 Ronnie Gideon (asst. bench); 70 Andy González (third base); -- Ethan Katz (pitching); 74 Jordan Pacheco (asst. hitting); 61 Jeff Pickler (bench); 72 Brett Pill (hitting); 76 Chris Rabago (bullpen catcher); 79 Gabe Ribas (asst. pitching); 40 active, 0 inactive, 1 non-roster invitees; 7-, 10-, or 15-day injured list; * Not on active roster; ^{†} Suspended list; Roster, coaches, and NRIs updated November 20, 2026; Transactions • Depth chart; → All MLB rosters

== Farm system ==
Level	Team	League	Manager	W	L	Position
AAA	Albuquerque Isotopes	Pacific Coast League (East Division)				
AA	Hartford Yard Goats	Eastern League (Northeast Division)				
High A	Spokane Indians	Northwest League				
Low A	Fresno Grizzlies	California League (North Division)				
Rookie	ACL Rockies	Arizona Complex League (East Division)				
Foreign Rookie	DSL Rockies	Dominican Summer League (Northeast Division)				
Foreign Rookie	DSL Colorado	Dominican Summer League (Northeast Division)				

Records
Preceded by 2026	Colorado Rockies seasons 2027	Succeeded by Current
