= 2027 San Francisco Giants season =

2027 San Francisco Giants
- League: National League
- Division: West
- Ballpark: Oracle Park
- City: San Francisco, California
- Owners: Charles B. Johnson (Majority shareholder); Greg E. Johnson (Chairman)
- President: Larry Baer
- President of baseball operations: Buster Posey
- General manager: Zack Minasian
- Manager: Tony Vitello
- Television: NBC Sports Bay Area/KNTV
- Radio: KNBR (104.5 FM and 680 AM)
- Stats: ESPN.com; Baseball Reference

The 2027 San Francisco Giants season is scheduled to be the 145th season for the franchise in Major League Baseball, their 70th year in San Francisco, their 28th at Oracle Park and the second season under manager Tony Vitello.

The season is contingent on Major League Baseball (MLB) and the Major League Baseball Players Association (MLBPA) signing a new collective bargaining agreement (CBA). Without a new CBA, MLB is expected to lock out the players on December 2, 2026, until one is signed. If such a lockout extends indefinitely, the season could be postponed, shortened, or even cancelled.

== Previous season ==
The Giants finished the 2026 season 65–97, fourth in the National League West and fourth-worst in MLB. It was their worst finish since the 2017, and they failed to spend a single day at or above .500. 71 players made an appearance for the Giants, the joint most in Major League history with the 2025 Atlanta Braves. With 17 players on the 60-day injured list (IL), the Giants broke the mark for most players on the 60-day IL at one time.

== Offseason ==
=== Coaching staff changes ===
2026 San Francisco Giants coaching staff changes
Position	Previous coach(es)	Vacancy reason	Replacement(s)	Source(s)
Hitting coach	Hunter Mense, 2026	Hired by the Kansas City Royals	TBD	
Offensive Coordinator	Position Established		James Rowson	

=== Transactions ===
==== October ====
- October 29, 2026 — RHP JT Brubaker elected free agnecy.
- October 29, 2026 — RHP Braxton Roxby was claimed off waivers by the Washington Nationals.
- October 29, 2026 — OF Grant McCray was claimed off waivers by the Seattle Mariners.
- October 29, 2026 — The Giants outrighted INF Osleivis Basabe, RHP Jason Foley and LHP Matt Gage to Triple–A.
- October 30, 2026 — The Giants outrighted C Andrew Knizner to Triple–A.

==== November ====
- November 1, 2026 — The Giants traded INF Nate Furman to the Washington Nationals in exchange for LHP Tony Neubeck.
- November 2, 2026 — RHP Duncan Davitt was claimed off waivers by the Cincinnati Reds.
- November 2, 2026 — RHP José Buttó was claimed off waivers by the Texas Rangers.
- November 2, 2026 — INFs Brett Harris and Shay Whitcomb were claimed off waivers by the Philadelphia Phillies.
- November 2, 2026 — C Zach Morgan was claimed off waivers by the Baltimore Orioles.
- November 2, 2026 — The Giants released RHP Tristan Beck and outrighted RHP Joel Kuhnel and LHP Seth Lonsway to Triple–A.
- November 2, 2026 — The Giants declined the option for RHP Rowan Wick and designated LHP Reiver Sanmartín for assingment.
- November 6, 2026 — The Giants traded LHP Reiver Sanmartín to the Washington Nationals in exchange for RHP Robert Cranz.
- November 15, 2026 — The Giants traded RHP Ryan Walker to the Milwaukee Brewers in exchange for RHPs Blake Holub and Gavin Perry.
- November 17, 2026 — The Giants selected the contracts of LHP Henry Lalane and RHPs Josh Bostick and Marty Gair and designated INF Christian Koss and RHP Rowan Wick for assingment.
- November 20, 2026 — The Giants traded INF Christian Koss to the Tampa Bay Rays in exchange for RHP Cole Stokes.
- November 20, 2026 — The Giants declined to tender contracts to OF Víctor Bericoto and RHP Rowan Wick.
- November 20, 2026 — The Giants signed RHP Camilo Doval to a one-year $6.3 million contract.

== Game log ==
The 2027 schedule is tentative until a new collective bargaining agreement (CBA) is signed between Major League Baseball (MLB) and the Major League Baseball Players Association (MLBPA). If the labor dispute extends into late February or early March, MLB would then start to consider whether to postpone or shorten the season.

=== Regular season ===
Legend
	Giants win
	Giants loss
	Postponement
**Bold**	Giants team member

2027 Game Log: 0–0 (Home: 0–0; Away: 0–0)
March/April: 0–0 (Home: 0–0; Away: 0–0)

#	Date	Opponent	Score	Win	Loss	Save	Stadium	Attendance	Record
1	March 25	Rockies	–	(–)	(–)	–	**Oracle Park**		–
2	March 27	Rockies	–	(–)	(–)	–	**Oracle Park**		–
3	March 28	Rockies	–	(–)	(–)	–	**Oracle Park**		–
4	March 29	Diamondbacks	–	(–)	(–)	–	**Oracle Park**		–
5	March 30	Diamondbacks	–	(–)	(–)	–	**Oracle Park**		–
6	March 31	Diamondbacks	–	(–)	(–)	–	**Oracle Park**		–
7	April 2	@ Mets	–	(–)	(–)	–	Citi Field		–
8	April 3	@ Mets	–	(–)	(–)	–	Citi Field		–
9	April 4	@ Mets	–	(–)	(–)	–	Citi Field		–
10	April 5	@ Braves	–	(–)	(–)	–	Truist Park		–
11	April 6	@ Braves	–	(–)	(–)	–	Truist Park		–
12	April 7	@ Braves	–	(–)	(–)	–	Truist Park		–
13	April 8	@ Braves	–	(–)	(–)	–	Truist Park		–
14	April 9	Cardinals	–	(–)	(–)	–	**Oracle Park**		–
15	April 10	Cardinals	–	(–)	(–)	–	**Oracle Park**		–
16	April 11	Cardinals	–	(–)	(–)	–	**Oracle Park**		–
17	April 13	Orioles	–	(–)	(–)	–	**Oracle Park**		–
18	April 14	Orioles	–	(–)	(–)	–	**Oracle Park**		–
19	April 15	Orioles	–	(–)	(–)	–	**Oracle Park**		–
20	April 16	@ White Sox	–	(–)	(–)	–	Rate Field		–
21	April 17	@ White Sox	–	(–)	(–)	–	Rate Field		–
22	April 18	@ White Sox	–	(–)	(–)	–	Rate Field		–
23	April 20	@ Pirates	–	(–)	(–)	–	PNC Park		–
24	April 21	@ Pirates	–	(–)	(–)	–	PNC Park		–
25	April 22	@ Pirates	–	(–)	(–)	–	PNC Park		–
26	April 23	@ Reds	–	(–)	(–)	–	Great American Ball Park		–
27	April 24	@ Reds	–	(–)	(–)	–	Great American Ball Park		–
28	April 25	@ Reds	–	(–)	(–)	–	Great American Ball Park		–
29	April 26	Mariners	–	(–)	(–)	–	**Oracle Park**		–
30	April 27	Mariners	–	(–)	(–)	–	**Oracle Park**		–
31	April 28	Mariners	–	(–)	(–)	–	**Oracle Park**		–
32	April 30	Phillies	–	(–)	(–)	–	**Oracle Park**		–

May: 0–0 (Home: 0–0; Away: 0–0)

#	Date	Opponent	Score	Win	Loss	Save	Stadium	Attendance	Record
33	May 1	Phillies	–	(–)	(–)	–	**Oracle Park**		–
34	May 2	Phillies	–	(–)	(–)	–	**Oracle Park**		–
35	May 3	@ Brewers	–	(–)	(–)	–	American Family Field		–
36	May 4	@ Brewers	–	(–)	(–)	–	American Family Field		–
37	May 5	@ Brewers	–	(–)	(–)	–	American Family Field		–
38	May 6	@ Dodgers	–	(–)	(–)	–	Dodger Stadium		–
39	May 7	@ Dodgers	–	(–)	(–)	–	Dodger Stadium		–
40	May 8	@ Dodgers	–	(–)	(–)	–	Dodger Stadium		–
41	May 9	@ Dodgers	–	(–)	(–)	–	Dodger Stadium		–
42	May 11	Rangers	–	(–)	(–)	–	**Oracle Park**		–
43	May 12	Rangers	–	(–)	(–)	–	**Oracle Park**		–
44	May 13	Rangers	–	(–)	(–)	–	**Oracle Park**		–
45	May 14	Royals	–	(–)	(–)	–	**Oracle Park**		–
46	May 15	Royals	–	(–)	(–)	–	**Oracle Park**		–
47	May 16	Royals	–	(–)	(–)	–	**Oracle Park**		–
48	May 18	@ Tigers	–	(–)	(–)	–	Fifth Third Park		–
49	May 19	@ Tigers	–	(–)	(–)	–	Fifth Third Park		–
50	May 20	@ Tigers	–	(–)	(–)	–	Fifth Third Park		–
51	May 21	@ Yankees	–	(–)	(–)	–	Yankee Stadium		–
52	May 22	@ Yankees	–	(–)	(–)	–	Yankee Stadium		–
53	May 23	@ Yankees	–	(–)	(–)	–	Yankee Stadium		–
54	May 24	Padres	–	(–)	(–)	–	**Oracle Park**		–
55	May 25	Padres	–	(–)	(–)	–	**Oracle Park**		–
56	May 26	Padres	–	(–)	(–)	–	**Oracle Park**		–
57	May 27	Padres	–	(–)	(–)	–	**Oracle Park**		–
58	May 28	Reds	–	(–)	(–)	–	**Oracle Park**		–
59	May 29	Reds	–	(–)	(–)	–	**Oracle Park**		–
60	May 30	Reds	–	(–)	(–)	–	**Oracle Park**		–
61	May 31	Nationals	–	(–)	(–)	–	**Oracle Park**		–

June: 0–0 (Home: 0–0; Away: 0–0)

#	Date	Opponent	Score	Win	Loss	Save	Stadium	Attendance	Record
62	June 1	Nationals	–	(–)	(–)	–	**Oracle Park**		–
63	June 2	Nationals	–	(–)	(–)	–	**Oracle Park**		–
64	June 4	@ Diamondbacks	–	(–)	(–)	–	Chase Field		–
65	June 5	@ Diamondbacks	–	(–)	(–)	–	Chase Field		–
66	June 6	@ Diamondbacks	–	(–)	(–)	–	Chase Field		–
67	June 7	@ Padres	–	(–)	(–)	–	Petco Park		–
68	June 8	@ Padres	–	(–)	(–)	–	Petco Park		–
69	June 9	@ Padres	–	(–)	(–)	–	Petco Park		–
70	June 11	Mets	–	(–)	(–)	–	**Oracle Park**		–
71	June 12	Mets	–	(–)	(–)	–	**Oracle Park**		–
72	June 13	Mets	–	(–)	(–)	–	**Oracle Park**		–
73	June 14	Dodgers	–	(–)	(–)	–	**Oracle Park**		–
74	June 15	Dodgers	–	(–)	(–)	–	**Oracle Park**		–
75	June 16	Dodgers	–	(–)	(–)	–	**Oracle Park**		–
76	June 18	@ Phillies	–	(–)	(–)	–	Citizens Bank Park		–
77	June 19	@ Phillies	–	(–)	(–)	–	Citizens Bank Park		–
78	June 20	@ Phillies	–	(–)	(–)	–	Citizens Bank Park		–
79	June 21	@ Blue Jays	–	(–)	(–)	–	Rogers Centre		–
80	June 22	@ Blue Jays	–	(–)	(–)	–	Rogers Centre		–
81	June 23	@ Blue Jays	–	(–)	(–)	–	Rogers Centre		–
82	June 24	Cubs	–	(–)	(–)	–	**Oracle Park**		–
83	June 25	Cubs	–	(–)	(–)	–	**Oracle Park**		–
84	June 26	Cubs	–	(–)	(–)	–	**Oracle Park**		–
85	June 27	Cubs	–	(–)	(–)	–	**Oracle Park**		–
86	June 28	Rays	–	(–)	(–)	–	**Oracle Park**		–
87	June 29	Rays	–	(–)	(–)	–	**Oracle Park**		–
88	June 30	Rays	–	(–)	(–)	–	**Oracle Park**		–

July: 0–0 (Home: 0–0; Away: 0–0)

#	Date	Opponent	Score	Win	Loss	Save	Stadium	Attendance	Record
89	July 1	@ Diamondbacks	–	(–)	(–)	–	Chase Field		–
90	July 2	@ Diamondbacks	–	(–)	(–)	–	Chase Field		–
91	July 3	@ Diamondbacks	–	(–)	(–)	–	Chase Field		–
92	July 4	@ Diamondbacks	–	(–)	(–)	–	Chase Field		–
93	July 6	@ Rockies	–	(–)	(–)	–	Coors Field		–
94	July 7	@ Rockies	–	(–)	(–)	–	Coors Field		–
95	July 8	@ Rockies	–	(–)	(–)	–	Coors Field		–
96	July 9	@ Astros	–	(–)	(–)	–	Daikin Park		–
97	July 10	@ Astros	–	(–)	(–)	–	Daikin Park		–
98	July 11	@ Astros	–	(–)	(–)	–	Daikin Park		–
–	July 13	**97th All-Star Game in Chicago, IL**							
99	July 16	Athletics	–	(–)	(–)	–	**Oracle Park**		–
100	July 17	Athletics	–	(–)	(–)	–	**Oracle Park**		–
101	July 18	Athletics	–	(–)	(–)	–	**Oracle Park**		–
102	July 19	Rockies	–	(–)	(–)	–	**Oracle Park**		–
103	July 20	Rockies	–	(–)	(–)	–	**Oracle Park**		–
104	July 21	Rockies	–	(–)	(–)	–	**Oracle Park**		–
105	July 22	Rockies	–	(–)	(–)	–	**Oracle Park**		–
106	July 23	Padres	–	(–)	(–)	–	**Oracle Park**		–
107	July 24	Padres	–	(–)	(–)	–	**Oracle Park**		–
108	July 25	Padres	–	(–)	(–)	–	**Oracle Park**		–
109	July 26	@ Angels	–	(–)	(–)	–	Angel Stadium		–
110	July 27	@ Angels	–	(–)	(–)	–	Angel Stadium		–
111	July 28	@ Angels	–	(–)	(–)	–	Angel Stadium		–
112	July 30	@ Dodgers	–	(–)	(–)	–	Dodger Stadium		–
113	July 31	@ Dodgers	–	(–)	(–)	–	Dodger Stadium		–

August: 0–0 (Home: 0–0; Away: 0–0)

#	Date	Opponent	Score	Win	Loss	Save	Stadium	Attendance	Record
114	August 1	@ Dodgers	–	(–)	(–)	–	Dodger Stadium		–
115	August 2	@ Cubs	–	(–)	(–)	–	Wrigley Field		–
116	August 3	@ Cubs	–	(–)	(–)	–	Wrigley Field		–
117	August 4	@ Cubs	–	(–)	(–)	–	Wrigley Field		–
118	August 6	Dodgers	–	(–)	(–)	–	**Oracle Park**		–
119	August 7	Dodgers	–	(–)	(–)	–	**Oracle Park**		–
120	August 8	Dodgers	–	(–)	(–)	–	**Oracle Park**		–
121	August 9	Brewers	–	(–)	(–)	–	**Oracle Park**		–
122	August 10	Brewers	–	(–)	(–)	–	**Oracle Park**		–
123	August 11	Brewers	–	(–)	(–)	–	**Oracle Park**		–
124	August 13	@ Marlins	–	(–)	(–)	–	LoanDepot Park		–
125	August 14	@ Marlins	–	(–)	(–)	–	LoanDepot Park		–
126	August 15	@ Marlins	–	(–)	(–)	–	LoanDepot Park		–
127	August 17	@ Nationals	–	(–)	(–)	–	Nationals Park		–
128	August 18	@ Nationals	–	(–)	(–)	–	Nationals Park		–
129	August 19	@ Nationals	–	(–)	(–)	–	Nationals Park		–
130	August 20	Marlins	–	(–)	(–)	–	**Oracle Park**		–
131	August 21	Marlins	–	(–)	(–)	–	**Oracle Park**		–
132	August 22	Marlins	–	(–)	(–)	–	**Oracle Park**		–
133	August 24	Red Sox	–	(–)	(–)	–	**Oracle Park**		–
134	August 25	Red Sox	–	(–)	(–)	–	**Oracle Park**		–
135	August 26	Red Sox	–	(–)	(–)	–	**Oracle Park**		–
136	August 27	@ Athletics	–	(–)	(–)	–	Sutter Health Park		–
137	August 28	@ Athletics	–	(–)	(–)	–	Sutter Health Park		–
138	August 29	@ Athletics	–	(–)	(–)	–	Sutter Health Park		–
139	August 30	Guardians	–	(–)	(–)	–	**Oracle Park**		–
140	August 31	Guardians	–	(–)	(–)	–	**Oracle Park**		–

September: 0–0 (Home: 0–0; Away: 0–0)

#	Date	Opponent	Score	Win	Loss	Save	Stadium	Attendance	Record
141	September 1	Guardians	–	(–)	(–)	–	**Oracle Park**		–
142	September 3	@ Cardinals	–	(–)	(–)	–	Busch Stadium		–
143	September 4	@ Cardinals	–	(–)	(–)	–	Busch Stadium		–
144	September 5	@ Cardinals	–	(–)	(–)	–	Busch Stadium		–
145	September 6	@ Padres	–	(–)	(–)	–	Petco Park		–
146	September 7	@ Padres	–	(–)	(–)	–	Petco Park		–
147	September 8	@ Padres	–	(–)	(–)	–	Petco Park		–
148	September 10	Pirates	–	(–)	(–)	–	**Oracle Park**		–
149	September 11	Pirates	–	(–)	(–)	–	**Oracle Park**		–
150	September 12	Pirates	–	(–)	(–)	–	**Oracle Park**		–
151	September 13	Diamondbacks	–	(–)	(–)	–	**Oracle Park**		–
152	September 14	Diamondbacks	–	(–)	(–)	–	**Oracle Park**		–
153	September 15	Diamondbacks	–	(–)	(–)	–	**Oracle Park**		–
154	September 17	Braves	–	(–)	(–)	–	**Oracle Park**		–
155	September 18	Braves	–	(–)	(–)	–	**Oracle Park**		–
156	September 19	Braves	–	(–)	(–)	–	**Oracle Park**		–
157	September 21	@ Twins	–	(–)	(–)	–	Target Field		–
158	September 22	@ Twins	–	(–)	(–)	–	Target Field		–
159	September 23	@ Twins	–	(–)	(–)	–	Target Field		–
160	September 24	@ Rockies	–	(–)	(–)	–	Coors Field		–
161	September 25	@ Rockies	–	(–)	(–)	–	Coors Field		–
162	September 26	@ Rockies	–	(–)	(–)	–	Coors Field		–

== Current roster ==
San Francisco Giants 2027 spring training roster
40-man roster		Non-roster invitees	Coaches / other
Pitchers: 60 Hayden Birdsong; -- Josh Bostick; 57 Camilo Doval; -- Marty Gair; 68 Trent Harris; 31 Sam Hentges; 12 Adrian Houser; -- Henry Lalane; 87 Yunior Marte; 72 Trevor McDonald; -- Miguel Méndez; 45 Anthony Molina; 63 Joel Peguero; 83 Cesar Perdomo; 73 Randy Rodríguez; 65 Landen Roupp; 77 Carson Seymour; 66 Dylan Smith; 46 Blade Tidwell; 62 Logan Webb; 88 Carson Whisenhunt; 71 Matt Wilkinson; 67 Keaton Winn	Catchers: 61 Drew Cavanaugh; 79 Jesús Rodríguez; 6 Daniel Susac; Infielders: 2 Willy Adames; 26 Matt Chapman; 16 Rafael Devers; 7 Marcelo Mayer; Outfielders: 9 Harrison Bader; 91 Scott Bandura; 53 Jonah Cox; 94 Bo Davidson; 0 Drew Gilbert; 52 Turner Hill; 51 Jung Hoo Lee; 10 Casey Schmitt; Designated hitters: 8 Bryce Eldridge		Manager: 23 Tony Vitello; Coaches: 85 Frank Anderson (pitching director); 96 Oscar Bernard (assistant hitting); 97 Alex Burg (field coordinator/catching); 75 Jesse Chavez (bullpen); 84 Justin Meccage (pitching); 81 Gary Pettis (third base); 82 Shane Robinson (first base); -- James Rowson (offensive coordinator); 33 Jayce Tingler (bench); 99 Taira Uematsu (quality control); 37 Ron Washington (infield); 92 Christian Wonders (assistant pitching); 98 Eliezer Zambrano (bullpen catcher); Vacant (hitting); 39 active, 0 inactive, 0 non-roster invitees; 7-, 10-, or 15-day injured list; * Not on active roster; ^{†} Suspended list; Roster, coaches, and NRIs updated November 20, 2026; Transactions • Depth chart; → All MLB rosters

== Farm system ==
Level	Team	League	Manager	First half win–loss record	First half position	Second half win–loss record	Second half position	Postseason
AAA	Sacramento River Cats	Pacific Coast League (West Division)						TBD
AA	Richmond Flying Squirrels	Eastern League (Southwest Division)						TBD
High-A	Eugene Emeralds	Northwest League						TBD
Low-A	San Jose Giants	California League (North Division)						TBD
Rookie	ACL Giants	Arizona Complex League (East Division)						TBD
Foreign Rookie	DSL Giants Black	Dominican Summer League (San Pedro Division)				–	–	TBD
Foreign Rookie	DSL Giants Orange	Dominican Summer League (Northeast Division)				–	–	TBD
