= 2027 Minnesota Twins season =

2027 Minnesota Twins
- League: American League
- Division: Central
- Ballpark: Target Field
- City: Minneapolis, Minnesota
- Owner: Jim Pohlad
- President: Dave St. Peter
- General manager: Jeremy Zoll
- Manager: Derek Shelton
- Television: MLB Local Media
- Radio: WCCO
- Stats: ESPN.com; Baseball Reference

The 2027 Minnesota Twins season is scheduled to be the 67th season for the Minnesota Twins franchise in the Twin Cities of Minnesota, their 18th season at Target Field, and the 129th overall in the American League.

The season is contingent on Major League Baseball (MLB) and the Major League Baseball Players Association (MLBPA) signing a new collective bargaining agreement (CBA). Without a new CBA, MLB is expected to lock out the players on December 2, 2026, until one is signed. If such a lockout extends indefinitely, the season could be postponed, shortened, or even cancelled.

== Game log ==
The 2027 schedule is tentative until a new collective bargaining agreement (CBA) is signed between Major League Baseball (MLB) and the Major League Baseball Players Association (MLBPA). If the labor dispute extends into late February or early March, MLB would then start to consider whether to postpone or shorten the season.

Legend
	Twins win
	Twins loss
	Postponement
**Bold**	Twins team member

2027 Game Log: 0–0 (Home: 0–0; Road: 0–0)
March/April: 0–0 (Home: 0–0; Road: 0–0)

#	Date	Opponent	Score	Win	Loss	Save	Attendance	Record	Streak
1	March 25	@ Royals	—	—	—	—	—	–	—
2	March 27	@ Royals	—	—	—	—	—	–	—
3	March 28	@ Royals	—	—	—	—	—	–	—
4	March 29	@ Dodgers	—	—	—	—	—	–	—
5	March 30	@ Dodgers	—	—	—	—	—	–	—
6	March 31	@ Dodgers	—	—	—	—	—	–	—
7	April 2	Rays	—	—	—	—	—	–	—
8	April 3	Rays	—	—	—	—	—	–	—
9	April 4	Rays	—	—	—	—	—	–	—
10	April 5	Rays	—	—	—	—	—	–	—
11	April 6	Nationals	—	—	—	—	—	–	—
12	April 7	Nationals	—	—	—	—	—	–	—
13	April 8	Nationals	—	—	—	—	—	–	—
14	April 9	@ Reds	—	—	—	—	—	–	—
15	April 10	@ Reds	—	—	—	—	—	–	—
16	April 11	@ Reds	—	—	—	—	—	–	—
17	April 13	@ Guardians	—	—	—	—	—	–	—
18	April 14	@ Guardians	—	—	—	—	—	–	—
19	April 15	@ Guardians	—	—	—	—	—	–	—
20	April 16	Tigers	—	—	—	—	—	–	—
21	April 17	Tigers	—	—	—	—	—	–	—
22	April 18	Tigers	—	—	—	—	—	–	—
23	April 19	@ Cardinals	—	—	—	—	—	–	—
24	April 20	@ Cardinals	—	—	—	—	—	–	—
25	April 21	@ Cardinals	—	—	—	—	—	–	—
26	April 23	Padres	—	—	—	—	—	–	—
27	April 24	Padres	—	—	—	—	—	–	—
28	April 25	Padres	—	—	—	—	—	–	—
29	April 27	Athletics	—	—	—	—	—	–	—
30	April 28	Athletics	—	—	—	—	—	–	—
31	April 29	Athletics	—	—	—	—	—	–	—
32	April 30	@ Mariners	—	—	—	—	—	–	—

May: 0–0 (Home: 0–0; Road: 0–0)

#	Date	Opponent	Score	Win	Loss	Save	Attendance	Record	Streak
33	May 1	@ Mariners	—	—	—	—	—	–	—
34	May 2	@ Mariners	—	—	—	—	—	–	—
35	May 3	@ Angels	—	—	—	—	—	–	—
36	May 4	@ Angels	—	—	—	—	—	–	—
37	May 5	@ Angels	—	—	—	—	—	–	—
38	May 6	@ Angels	—	—	—	—	—	–	—
39	May 7	Pirates	—	—	—	—	—	–	—
40	May 8	Pirates	—	—	—	—	—	–	—
41	May 9	Pirates	—	—	—	—	—	–	—
42	May 10	Astros	—	—	—	—	—	–	—
43	May 11	Astros	—	—	—	—	—	–	—
44	May 12	Astros	—	—	—	—	—	–	—
45	May 14	@ Rockies	—	—	—	—	—	–	—
46	May 15	@ Rockies	—	—	—	—	—	–	—
47	May 16	@ Rockies	—	—	—	—	—	–	—
48	May 17	@ Athletics	—	—	—	—	—	–	—
49	May 18	@ Athletics	—	—	—	—	—	–	—
50	May 19	@ Athletics	—	—	—	—	—	–	—
51	May 21	Mets	—	—	—	—	—	–	—
52	May 22	Mets	—	—	—	—	—	–	—
53	May 23	Mets	—	—	—	—	—	–	—
54	May 24	Rangers	—	—	—	—	—	–	—
55	May 25	Rangers	—	—	—	—	—	–	—
56	May 26	Rangers	—	—	—	—	—	–	—
57	May 28	@ Blue Jays	—	—	—	—	—	–	—
58	May 29	@ Blue Jays	—	—	—	—	—	–	—
59	May 30	@ Blue Jays	—	—	—	—	—	–	—
60	May 31	@ Tigers	—	—	—	—	—	–	—

June: 0–0 (Home: 0–0; Road: 0–0)

#	Date	Opponent	Score	Win	Loss	Save	Attendance	Record	Streak
61	June 1	@ Tigers	—	—	—	—	—	–	—
62	June 2	@ Tigers	—	—	—	—	—	–	—
63	June 4	@ Braves	—	—	—	—	—	–	—
64	June 5	@ Braves	—	—	—	—	—	–	—
65	June 6	@ Braves	—	—	—	—	—	–	—
66	June 7	Angels	—	—	—	—	—	–	—
67	June 8	Angels	—	—	—	—	—	–	—
68	June 9	Angels	—	—	—	—	—	–	—
69	June 10	White Sox	—	—	—	—	—	–	—
70	June 11	White Sox	—	—	—	—	—	–	—
71	June 12	White Sox	—	—	—	—	—	–	—
72	June 13	White Sox	—	—	—	—	—	–	—
73	June 14	@ Phillies	—	—	—	—	—	–	—
74	June 15	@ Phillies	—	—	—	—	—	–	—
75	June 16	@ Phillies	—	—	—	—	—	–	—
76	June 18	@ White Sox	—	—	—	—	—	–	—
77	June 19	@ White Sox	—	—	—	—	—	–	—
78	June 20	@ White Sox	—	—	—	—	—	–	—
79	June 21	Yankees	—	—	—	—	—	–	—
80	June 22	Yankees	—	—	—	—	—	–	—
81	June 23	Yankees	—	—	—	—	—	–	—
82	June 24	Guardians	—	—	—	—	—	–	—
83	June 25	Guardians	—	—	—	—	—	–	—
84	June 26	Guardians	—	—	—	—	—	–	—
85	June 27	Guardians	—	—	—	—	—	–	—
86	June 29	@ Red Sox	—	—	—	—	—	–	—
87	June 30	@ Red Sox	—	—	—	—	—	–	—

July: 0–0 (Home: 0–0; Road: 0–0)

#	Date	Opponent	Score	Win	Loss	Save	Attendance	Record	Streak
88	July 1	@ Red Sox	—	—	—	—	—	–	—
89	July 2	@ Guardians	—	—	—	—	—	–	—
90	July 3	@ Guardians	—	—	—	—	—	–	—
91	July 4	@ Guardians	—	—	—	—	—	–	—
92	July 6	Royals	—	—	—	—	—	–	—
93	July 7	Royals	—	—	—	—	—	–	—
94	July 8	Royals	—	—	—	—	—	–	—
95	July 9	Red Sox	—	—	—	—	—	–	—
96	July 10	Red Sox	—	—	—	—	—	–	—
97	July 11	Red Sox	—	—	—	—	—	–	—
ASG	July 13	AL @ NL	—	—	—	―	—	—	N/A
98	July 16	@ Brewers	—	—	—	—	—	–	—
99	July 17	@ Brewers	—	—	—	—	—	–	—
100	July 18	@ Brewers	—	—	—	—	—	–	—
101	July 19	@ Rangers	—	—	—	—	—	–	—
102	July 20	@ Rangers	—	—	—	—	—	–	—
103	July 21	@ Rangers	—	—	—	—	—	–	—
104	July 23	Cubs	—	—	—	—	—	–	—
105	July 24	Cubs	—	—	—	—	—	–	—
106	July 25	Cubs	—	—	—	—	—	–	—
107	July 26	Blue Jays	—	—	—	—	—	–	—
108	July 27	Blue Jays	—	—	—	—	—	–	—
109	July 28	Blue Jays	—	—	—	—	—	–	—
110	July 29	@ Royals	—	—	—	—	—	–	—
111	July 30	@ Royals	—	—	—	—	—	–	—
112	July 31	@ Royals	—	—	—	—	—	–	—

August: 0–0 (Home: 0–0; Road: 0–0)

#	Date	Opponent	Score	Win	Loss	Save	Attendance	Record	Streak
113	August 1	@ Royals	—	—	—	—	—	–	—
114	August 3	@ Yankees	—	—	—	—	—	–	—
115	August 4	@ Yankees	—	—	—	—	—	–	—
116	August 5	@ Yankees	—	—	—	—	—	–	—
117	August 6	Guardians	—	—	—	—	—	–	—
118	August 7	Guardians	—	—	—	—	—	–	—
119	August 8	Guardians	—	—	—	—	—	–	—
120	August 9	Royals	—	—	—	—	—	–	—
121	August 10	Royals	—	—	—	—	—	–	—
122	August 11	Royals	—	—	—	—	—	–	—
123	August 13	@ Astros	—	—	—	—	—	–	—
124	August 14	@ Astros	—	—	—	—	—	–	—
125	August 15	@ Astros	—	—	—	—	—	–	—
126	August 16	White Sox	—	—	—	—	—	–	—
127	August 17	White Sox	—	—	—	—	—	–	—
128	August 18	White Sox	—	—	—	—	—	–	—
129	August 20	Mariners	—	—	—	—	—	–	—
130	August 21	Mariners	—	—	—	—	—	–	—
131	August 22	Mariners	—	—	—	—	—	–	—
132	August 23	@ Orioles	—	—	—	—	—	–	—
133	August 24	@ Orioles	—	—	—	—	—	–	—
134	August 25	@ Orioles	—	—	—	—	—	–	—
135	August 27	@ Rays	—	—	—	—	—	–	—
136	August 28	@ Rays	—	—	—	—	—	–	—
137	August 29	@ Rays	—	—	—	—	—	–	—
138	August 31	Diamondbacks	—	—	—	—	—	–	—

September: 0–0 (Home: 0–0; Road: 0–0)

#	Date	Opponent	Score	Win	Loss	Save	Attendance	Record	Streak
139	September 1	Diamondbacks	—	—	—	—	—	–	—
140	September 2	Diamondbacks	—	—	—	—	—	–	—
141	September 3	Orioles	—	—	—	—	—	–	—
142	September 4	Orioles	—	—	—	—	—	–	—
143	September 5	Orioles	—	—	—	—	—	–	—
144	September 6	@ White Sox	—	—	—	—	—	–	—
145	September 7	@ White Sox	—	—	—	—	—	–	—
146	September 8	@ White Sox	—	—	—	—	—	–	—
147	September 10	Brewers	—	—	—	—	—	–	—
148	September 11	Brewers	—	—	—	—	—	–	—
149	September 12	Brewers	—	—	—	—	—	–	—
150	September 13	@ Tigers	—	—	—	—	—	–	—
151	September 14	@ Tigers	—	—	—	—	—	–	—
152	September 15	@ Tigers	—	—	—	—	—	–	—
153	September 16	@ Tigers	—	—	—	—	—	–	—
154	September 17	@ Marlins	—	—	—	—	—	–	—
155	September 18	@ Marlins	—	—	—	—	—	–	—
156	September 19	@ Marlins	—	—	—	—	—	–	—
157	September 21	Giants	—	—	—	—	—	–	—
158	September 22	Giants	—	—	—	—	—	–	—
159	September 23	Giants	—	—	—	—	—	–	—
160	September 24	Tigers	—	—	—	—	—	–	—
161	September 25	Tigers	—	—	—	—	—	–	—
162	September 26	Tigers	—	—	—	—	—	–	—

== Roster ==
Minnesota Twins 2027 spring training roster
40-man roster		Non-roster invitees	Coaches / other
Pitchers: 20 Mick Abel; 50 Garrett Acton; 45 Travis Adams; 26 Taj Bradley; 58 David Festa; 57 Kody Funderburk; 94 Yoendrys Gómez; -- Sonny Gray; 24 Jeff Hoffman; 13 Dean Kremer; 49 Pablo López; 52 Zebby Matthews; -- Bobby Miller; 78 Andrew Morris; 35 Tommy Nance; 53 Mike Paredes; 61 Connor Prielipp; 54 Marco Raya; 60 Kendry Rojas; 41 Joe Ryan; 44 Cole Sands	Catchers: 37 Víctor Caratini; 27 Ryan Jeffers; Infielders: 2 Kody Clemens; 12 Kaelen Culpepper; 15 Luke Keaschall; 5 Ryan Kreidler; 22 Brooks Lee; 1 Ben Ross; Outfielders: 25 Byron Buxton; 72 Gabriel González; 11 Walker Jenkins; 16 Austin Martin; 64 Hendry Méndez; 18 Alan Roden; 21 Emmanuel Rodríguez	Pitchers: -- José Espada	Manager: 8 Derek Shelton; Coaches: 67 Trevor Amicone (assistant hitting); 84 Keith Beauregard (hitting); 46 Ramon Borrego (third base); 75 Nate Dammann (quality control); 98 Anderson De La Rosa (bullpen catcher); 66 Toby Gardenhire (major league field coordinator); 68 Mark Hallberg (bench); 32 LaTroy Hawkins (bullpen); 98 Frank Nigro (bullpen catcher); 63 Mike Rabelo (assistant bench); 79 Rayden Sierra (assistant hitting); 0 Grady Sizemore (first base); Brian Reith (pitching); 36 active, 0 inactive, 1 non-roster invitees; 7-, 10-, or 15-day injured list; * Not on active roster; ^{†} Suspended list; Roster, coaches, and NRIs updated November 20, 2026; Transactions • Depth chart; → All MLB rosters

== Farm system ==
Level	Team	League	Manager
AAA	St. Paul Saints	International League	
AA	Wichita Turbo Tubs	Texas League	
High-A	Cedar Rapids Kernels	Midwest League	
Low-A	Fort Myers Mighty Mussels	Florida State League	
Rookie	FCL Twins	Florida Complex League	
Rookie	DSL Twins	Dominican Summer League	
