= 2027 Chicago Cubs season =

2027 Chicago Cubs
- League: National League
- Division: Central
- Ballpark: Wrigley Field
- City: Chicago
- Owner: Tom Ricketts
- President of baseball operations: Jed Hoyer
- General manager: Carter Hawkins
- Manager: Craig Counsell
- Television: Marquee Sports Network; Jon Sciambi, Jim Deshaies, Alex Cohen, Cliff Floyd, Rick Sutcliffe, Ryan Dempster Taylor McGregor, Elise Menaker, Pat Hughes, Lance Brozdowski
- Radio: WSCR; Chicago Cubs Radio Network; Pat Hughes, Ron Coomer, Zach Zaidman, Matt Spiegel

The 2027 Chicago Cubs season is scheduled to be the 156th season of the Chicago Cubs franchise, the 152nd in the National League, and the Cubs' 112th season at Wrigley Field. They are members of Major League Baseball's National League Central division.

The season is contingent on Major League Baseball (MLB) and the Major League Baseball Players Association (MLBPA) signing a new collective bargaining agreement (CBA). Without a new CBA, MLB is expected to lock out the players on December 2, 2026, until one is signed. If such a lockout extends indefinitely, the season could be postponed, shortened, or even cancelled.

== Previous season ==
The Cubs finished the 2026 season 89–73 to finish in second place in the division, 14 games behind the Milwaukee Brewers. They received the second wild card spot and faced the San Diego Padres in the National League Wild Card Series for the second consecutive year where they were swept in two games.

== Offseason ==
=== Transactions ===
==== October 2026 ====
October 1	Activated RHP Edward Cabrera, LHP Jordan Wicks, 3B BJ Murray Jr., RHP Trent Thornton, RHP Julian Aguiar, RHP Gavin Hollowell, DH Kevin Alcántara, LHP Braxton Garrett, RHP Tyler Ferguson, RHP Jayden Murray, RHP Ethan Roberts, 2B James Triantos, LHP Caleb Thielbar, and CF Justin Dean.
October 2	Signed free agents RHP Elvin Cepeda, LHP Manuel Cordero, 2B Rodelvis Santiesteban, RHP Maykoll Jaspe,t RHP Luis Zapata, and OF Sebastian Zorrilla to minor league contracts.
October 22	Signed free agent RHP Eliehiker Perdomo to a minor league contract.
October 29	RF Seiya Suzuki, CF Tyrone Taylor, RHP Trent Thornton, LHP David Peterson, LF Michael Conforto, LF Ian Happ, RHP Kevin Gausman, LHP Shota Imanaga, and RHP Aaron Civale elected free agency.
October 30	LHP Matthew Boyd and C Carson Kelly elected free agency.

==== November 2026 ====
Novamber 2	RHP Hunter Harvey, RHP Colin Rea, RHP Clay Holmes, and LHP Caleb Thielbar elected free agency. Activated LHP Riley Martin, RHP Porter Hodge, LHP Justin Steele, RHP Ben Brown, RHP Cade Horton, RHP Shelby Miller, and RHP Phil Maton from the 60-day injured list. Claimed RHP Eric Orze off waivers from Minnesota Twins. Sent 1B Tyler Austin outright to Iowa Cubs.
November 17	Selected the contract of RHP Brody McCullough from Knoxville Smokies. Selected the contract of RHP Jaxon Wiggins from Iowa.
November 19	Claimed RHP Chayce McDermott off waivers from New York Mets.

== Regular season ==
The 2027 schedule is tentative until a new collective bargaining agreement (CBA) is signed between Major League Baseball (MLB) and the Major League Baseball Players Association (MLBPA). If the labor dispute extends into late February or early March, MLB would then start to consider whether to postpone or shorten the season.

=== Game log ===
Legend
	Cubs win
	Cubs loss
	Postponement
	Clinched playoff spot
**Bold**	Cubs team member

2027 Game Log: 0–0 (Home: 0–0; Away: 0–0)
March/April: 0–0 (Home: 0–0; Road: 0–0)

#	Date	Opponent	Score	Win	Loss	Save	Attendance	Record	Streak/ box
1	March 25	Guardians	—	—	—	—	—	0–0	—
2	March 27	Guardians	—	—	—	—	—	0–0	—
3	March 28	Guardians	—	—	—	—	—	0–0	—
4	March 29	Cardinals	—	—	—	—	—	0–0	—
5	March 30	Cardinals	—	—	—	—	—	0–0	—
6	March 31	Cardinals	—	—	—	—	—	0–0	—
7	April 2	@ Angels	—	—	—	—	—	0–0	—
8	April 3	@ Angels	—	—	—	—	—	0–0	—
9	April 4	@ Angels	—	—	—	—	—	0–0	—
10	April 5	@ Athletics	—	—	—	—	—	0–0	—
11	April 6	@ Athletics	—	—	—	—	—	0–0	—
12	April 7	@ Athletics	—	—	—	—	—	0–0	—
13	April 9	Rangers	—	—	—	—	—	0–0	—
14	April 10	Rangers	—	—	—	—	—	0–0	—
15	April 11	Rangers	—	—	—	—	—	0–0	—
16	April 13	Phillies	—	—	—	—	—	0–0	—
17	April 14	Phillies	—	—	—	—	—	0–0	—
18	April 15	Phillies	—	—	—	—	—	0–0	—
19	April 16	@ Dodgers	—	—	—	—	—	0–0	—
20	April 17	@ Dodgers	—	—	—	—	—	0–0	—
21	April 18	@ Dodgers	—	—	—	—	—	0–0	—
22	April 19	@ Diamondbacks	—	—	—	—	—	0–0	—
23	April 20	@ Diamondbacks	—	—	—	—	—	0–0	—
24	April 21	@ Diamondbacks	—	—	—	—	—	0–0	—
25	April 23	Pirates	—	—	—	—	—	0–0	—
26	April 24	Pirates	—	—	—	—	—	0–0	—
27	April 25	Pirates	—	—	—	—	—	0–0	—
28	April 26	Brewers	—	—	—	—	—	0–0	—
29	April 27	Brewers	—	—	—	—	—	0–0	—
30	April 28	Brewers	—	—	—	—	—	0–0	—
31	April 30	@ Yankees	—	—	—	—	—	0–0	—

May: 0–0 (Home: 0–0; Road: 0–0)

#	Date	Opponent	Score	Win	Loss	Save	Attendance	Record	Streak/ box
32	May 1	@ Yankees	—	—	—	—	—	0–0	—
33	May 2	@ Yankees	—	—	—	—	—	0–0	—
34	May 3	@ Pirates	—	—	—	—	—	0–0	—
35	May 4	@ Pirates	—	—	—	—	—	0–0	—
36	May 5	@ Pirates	—	—	—	—	—	0–0	—
37	May 6	@ Pirates	—	—	—	—	—	0–0	—
38	May 7	Mariners	—	—	—	—	—	0–0	—
39	May 8	Mariners	—	—	—	—	—	0–0	—
40	May 9	Mariners	—	—	—	—	—	0–0	—
41	May 11	Marlins	—	—	—	—	—	0–0	—
42	May 12	Marlins	—	—	—	—	—	0–0	—
43	May 13	Marlins	—	—	—	—	—	0–0	—
44	May 14	@ Astros	—	—	—	—	—	0–0	—
45	May 15	@ Astros	—	—	—	—	—	0–0	—
46	May 16	@ Astros	—	—	—	—	—	0–0	—
47	May 17	@ Brewers	—	—	—	—	—	0–0	—
48	May 18	@ Brewers	—	—	—	—	—	0–0	—
49	May 19	@ Brewers	—	—	—	—	—	0–0	—
50	May 20	@ Brewers	—	—	—	—	—	0–0	—
51	May 21	Nationals	—	—	—	—	—	0–0	—
52	May 22	Nationals	—	—	—	—	—	0–0	—
53	May 23	Nationals	—	—	—	—	—	0–0	—
54	May 25	Royals	—	—	—	—	—	0–0	—
55	May 26	Royals	—	—	—	—	—	0–0	—
56	May 27	Royals	—	—	—	—	—	0–0	—
57	May 28	@ Cardinals	—	—	—	—	—	0–0	—
58	May 29	@ Cardinals	—	—	—	—	—	0–0	—
59	May 30	@ Cardinals	—	—	—	—	—	0–0	—
60	May 31	@ Marlins	—	—	—	—	—	0–0	—

June: 0–0 (Home: 0–0; Road: 0–0)

#	Date	Opponent	Score	Win	Loss	Save	Attendance	Record	Streak/ box
61	June 1	@ Marlins	—	—	—	—	—	0–0	—
62	June 2	@ Marlins	—	—	—	—	—	0–0	—
63	June 3	Dodgers	—	—	—	—	—	0–0	—
64	June 4	Dodgers	—	—	—	—	—	0–0	—
65	June 5	Dodgers	—	—	—	—	—	0–0	—
66	June 6	Dodgers	—	—	—	—	—	0–0	—
67	June 7	@ Reds	—	—	—	—	—	0–0	—
68	June 8	@ Reds	—	—	—	—	—	0–0	—
69	June 9	@ Reds	—	—	—	—	—	0–0	—
70	June 11	Rockies	—	—	—	—	—	0–0	—
71	June 12	Rockies	—	—	—	—	—	0–0	—
72	June 13	Rockies	—	—	—	—	—	0–0	—
73	June 14	Reds	—	—	—	—	—	0–0	—
74	June 15	Reds	—	—	—	—	—	0–0	—
75	June 16	Reds	—	—	—	—	—	0–0	—
76	June 18	@ Rockies	—	—	—	—	—	0–0	—
77	June 19	@ Rockies	—	—	—	—	—	0–0	—
78	June 20	@ Rockies	—	—	—	—	—	0–0	—
79	June 21	@ Padres	—	—	—	—	—	0–0	—
80	June 22	@ Padres	—	—	—	—	—	0–0	—
81	June 23	@ Padres	—	—	—	—	—	0–0	—
82	June 24	@ Giants	—	—	—	—	—	0–0	—
83	June 25	@ Giants	—	—	—	—	—	0–0	—
84	June 26	@ Giants	—	—	—	—	—	0–0	—
85	June 27	@ Giants	—	—	—	—	—	0–0	—
86	June 28	Padres	—	—	—	—	—	0–0	—
87	June 29	Padres	—	—	—	—	—	0–0	—
88	June 30	Padres	—	—	—	—	—	0–0	—

July: 0–0 (Home: 0–0; Road: 0–0)

#	Date	Opponent	Score	Win	Loss	Save	Attendance	Record	Streak/ box
89	July 1	Cardinals	—	—	—	—	—	0–0	—
90	July 2	Cardinals	—	—	—	—	—	0–0	—
91	July 3	Cardinals	—	—	—	—	—	0–0	—
92	July 4	Cardinals	—	—	—	—	—	0–0	—
93	July 6	@ Braves	—	—	—	—	—	0–0	—
94	July 7	@ Braves	—	—	—	—	—	0–0	—
95	July 8	@ Braves	—	—	—	—	—	0–0	—
96	July 9	@ Tigers	—	—	—	—	—	0–0	—
97	July 10	@ Tigers	—	—	—	—	—	0–0	—
98	July 11	@ Tigers	—	—	—	—	—	0–0	—
**97th All-Star Game in Chicago, IL**
99	July 16	White Sox	—	—	—	—	—	0–0	—
100	July 17	White Sox	—	—	—	—	—	0–0	—
101	July 18	White Sox	—	—	—	—	—	0–0	—
102	July 19	Pirates	—	—	—	—	—	0–0	—
103	July 20	Pirates	—	—	—	—	—	0–0	—
104	July 21	Pirates	—	—	—	—	—	0–0	—
105	July 23	@ Twins	—	—	—	—	—	0–0	—
106	July 24	@ Twins	—	—	—	—	—	0–0	—
107	July 25	@ Twins	—	—	—	—	—	0–0	—
108	July 26	@ Nationals	—	—	—	—	—	0–0	—
109	July 27	@ Nationals	—	—	—	—	—	0–0	—
110	July 28	@ Nationals	—	—	—	—	—	0–0	—
111	July 30	Red Sox	—	—	—	—	—	0–0	—
112	July 31	Red Sox	—	—	—	—	—	0–0	—

August: 0–0 (Home: 0–0; Road: 0–0)

#	Date	Opponent	Score	Win	Loss	Save	Attendance	Record	Streak/ box
113	August 1	Red Sox	—	—	—	—	—	0–0	—
114	August 2	Giants	—	—	—	—	—	0–0	—
115	August 3	Giants	—	—	—	—	—	0–0	—
116	August 4	Giants	—	—	—	—	—	0–0	—
117	August 6	@ White Sox	—	—	—	—	—	0–0	—
118	August 7	@ White Sox	—	—	—	—	—	0–0	—
119	August 8	@ White Sox	—	—	—	—	—	0–0	—
120	August 9	@ Cardinals	—	—	—	—	—	0–0	—
121	August 10	@ Cardinals	—	—	—	—	—	0–0	—
122	August 11	@ Cardinals	—	—	—	—	—	0–0	—
123	August 13	Rays	—	—	—	—	—	0–0	—
124	August 14	Rays	—	—	—	—	—	0–0	—
125	August 15	Rays	—	—	—	—	—	0–0	—
126	August 16	Diamondbacks	—	—	—	—	—	0–0	—
127	August 17	Diamondbacks	—	—	—	—	—	0–0	—
128	August 18	Diamondbacks	—	—	—	—	—	0–0	—
129	August 19	@ Blue Jays*	—	—	—	—	—	0–0	—
130	August 21	@ Blue Jays	—	—	—	—	—	0–0	—
131	August 22	@ Blue Jays	—	—	—	—	—	0–0	—
132	August 23	@ Pirates	—	—	—	—	—	0–0	—
133	August 24	@ Pirates	—	—	—	—	—	0–0	—
134	August 25	@ Pirates	—	—	—	—	—	0–0	—
135	August 27	Braves	—	—	—	—	—	0–0	—
136	August 28	Braves	—	—	—	—	—	0–0	—
137	August 29	Braves	—	—	—	—	—	0–0	—
138	August 30	Brewers	—	—	—	—	—	0–0	—
139	August 31	Brewers	—	—	—	—	—	0–0	—
*August 19 game played at Bowman Field in Williamsport, Pennsylvania

September: 0–0 (Home: 0–0; Road: 0–0)

#	Date	Opponent	Score	Win	Loss	Save	Attendance	Record	Streak/ box
140	September 1	Brewers	—	—	—	—	—	0–0	—
141	September 3	@ Reds	—	—	—	—	—	0–0	—
142	September 4	@ Reds	—	—	—	—	—	0–0	—
143	September 5	@ Reds	—	—	—	—	—	0–0	—
144	September 6	@ Brewers	—	—	—	—	—	0–0	—
145	September 7	@ Brewers	—	—	—	—	—	0–0	—
146	September 8	@ Brewers	—	—	—	—	—	0–0	—
147	September 9	Reds	—	—	—	—	—	0–0	—
148	September 10	Reds	—	—	—	—	—	0–0	—
149	September 11	Reds	—	—	—	—	—	0–0	—
150	September 12	Reds	—	—	—	—	—	0–0	—
151	September 14	Orioles	—	—	—	—	—	0–0	—
152	September 15	Orioles	—	—	—	—	—	0–0	—
153	September 16	Orioles	—	—	—	—	—	0–0	—
154	September 17	Mets	—	—	—	—	—	0–0	—
155	September 18	Mets	—	—	—	—	—	0–0	—
156	September 19	Mets	—	—	—	—	—	0–0	—
157	September 21	@ Phillies	—	—	—	—	—	0–0	—
158	September 22	@ Phillies	—	—	—	—	—	0–0	—
159	September 23	@ Phillies	—	—	—	—	—	0–0	—
160	September 24	@ Mets	—	—	—	—	—	0–0	—
161	September 25	@ Mets	—	—	—	—	—	0–0	—
162	September 26	@ Mets	—	—	—	—	—	0–0	—

== Roster ==
Chicago Cubs 2027 spring training roster
40-man roster		Non-roster invitees	Coaches / other
Pitchers: -- Julian Aguiar; 72 Javier Assad; 32 Ben Brown; 30 Edward Cabrera; 64 Tyler Ferguson; 60 Braxton Garrett; 37 Porter Hodge; 46 Gavin Hollowell; 22 Cade Horton; 51 Riley Martin; 88 Phil Maton; -- Brody McCullough; -- Chayce McDermott; 77 Shelby Miller; 70 Jayden Murray; -- Eric Orze; 48 Daniel Palencia; 33 Ryan Rolison; -- Braxton Roxby; 35 Justin Steele; 71 Jacob Webb; 36 Jordan Wicks; -- Jaxon Wiggins; 56 Ryan Zeferjahn	Catchers: 9 Miguel Amaya; -- Joey Bart; Infielders: 3 Alex Bregman; 29 Michael Busch; 2 Nico Hoerner; 83 BJ Murray; 75 Pedro Ramírez; 7 Dansby Swanson; 5 James Triantos; Outfielders: 13 Kevin Alcántara; 4 Pete Crow-Armstrong; 1 Justin Dean; 6 Matt Shaw	Pitchers: -- Gabe Klobosits; -- Bruno Lopez	Manager: 11 Craig Counsell; Coaches: 0 Quintin Berry (third base); 63 Juan Cabreja (assistant hitting); 93 Erick Castillo (bullpen catcher); 84 Ryan Flaherty (bench); 68 Tommy Hottovy (pitching); 86 Casey Jacobson (assistant pitching); 65 Jose Javier (first base); 76 Dustin Kelly (hitting); 74 AJ Lewis (staff assistant); 85 Garrett Lloyd (bullpen catcher); 80 John Mallee (assistant hitting); 90 Jonathan Mota (major league coach); 81 Mark Strittmatter (bullpen); 37 active, 0 inactive, 2 non-roster invitees; 7-, 10-, or 15-day injured list; * Not on active roster; ^{†} Suspended list; Roster, coaches, and NRIs updated November 21, 2026; Transactions • Depth chart; → All MLB rosters

== Farm system ==
Level	Team	League	Manager	Location	Ballpark
AAA	Iowa Cubs	International League		Des Moines, Iowa	Principal Park
AA	Knoxville Smokies	Southern League		Knoxville, Tennessee	Covenant Health Park
High-A	South Bend Cubs	Midwest League		South Bend, Indiana	Four Winds Field at Coveleski Stadium
Single-A	Myrtle Beach Pelicans	Carolina League		Myrtle Beach, South Carolina	TicketReturn.com Field
Rookie	ACL Cubs	Arizona Complex League		Mesa, Arizona	Sloan Park
Rookie	DSL Cubs	Dominican Summer League		Boca Chica, Dominican Republic	Baseball City Complex
