= Tony Perezchica =

Mexican baseball player and coach (born 1966)

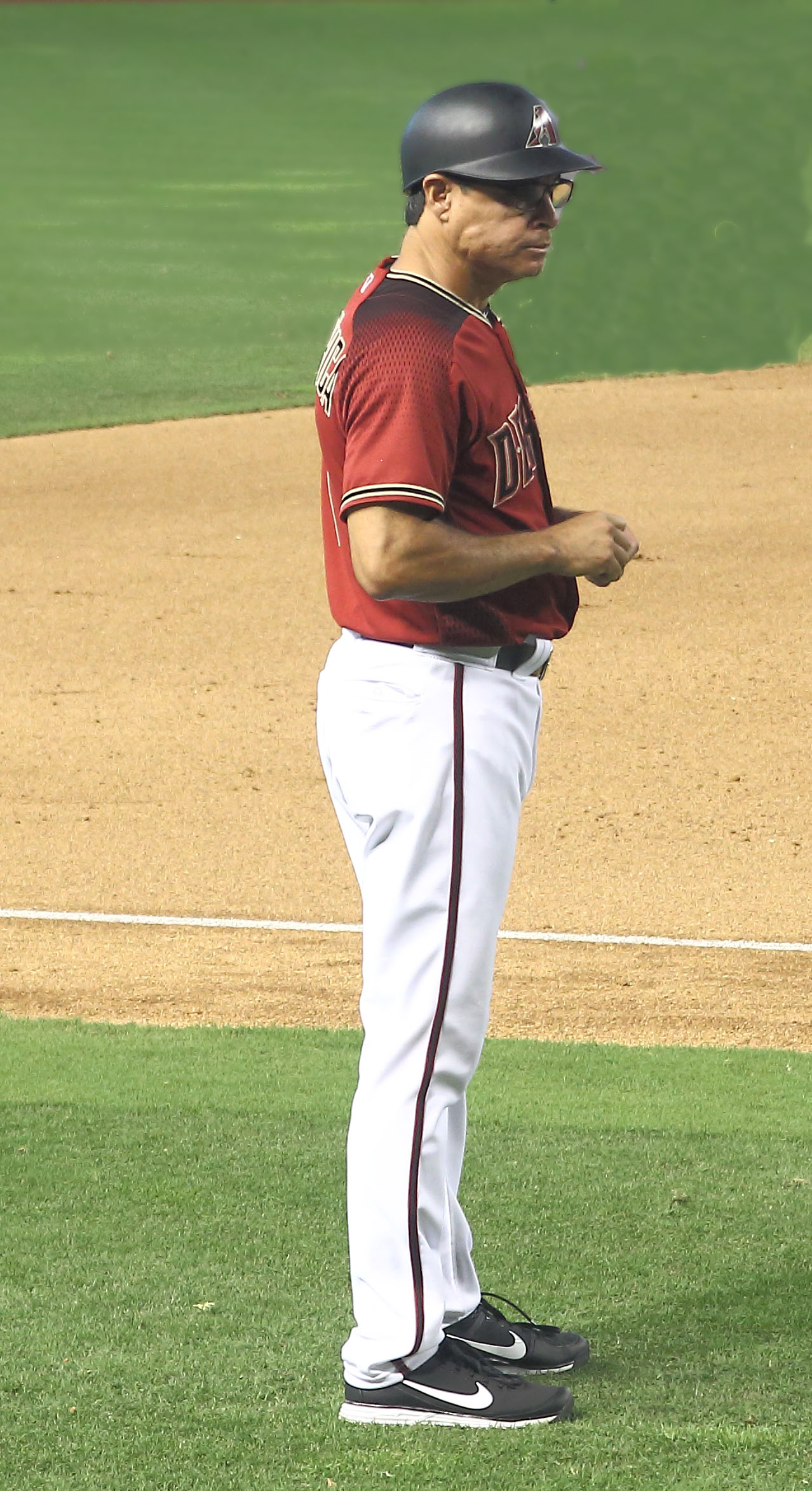
- Perezchica coaching for the Diamondbacks in 2017
- Infielder / Coach
- Born: 20 April 1966 (age 60); Mexicali, Mexico
- Batted: Right Threw: Right

MLB debut
- 7 September, 1988, for the San Francisco Giants

Last MLB appearance
- 20 May, 1992, for the Cleveland Indians

MLB statistics
- Batting average: .228
- Home runs: 0
- Runs batted in: 5
- Stats at Baseball Reference

Teams
- As player: San Francisco Giants (1988, 1990–1991); Cleveland Indians (1991–1992); As coach: Arizona Diamondbacks (2017–2024); Houston Astros (2025–2026)

Antonio Llamas Perezchica (born 20 April 1966) is a Mexican professional baseball player and coach. He played in Major League Baseball (MLB) as an infielder for the San Francisco Giants and Cleveland Indians from 1988–1992. He has also coached in MLB for the Arizona Diamondbacks and Houston Astros.

== Professional career ==
=== San Francisco Giants ===
Perezchica was drafted by the San Francisco Giants in the third round of the 1984 Major League Baseball draft. He began his professional career that year with the Short-Season Everett Giants of the Northwest League. He batted .193 with six doubles and one triples in 33 games.

In his second professional season, 1985, Perezchica was promoted to the Class-A Clinton Giants of the Midwest League. He hit .241 with 109 hits, 21 doubles, eight triples and four home runs in 127 games.

He spent the 1986 season with the Class-A Fresno Giants of the California League. Perezchica hit .279 with 30 doubles, eight triples, and nine home runs in 126 games.

With the Double-A Shreveport Captains of the Texas League in 1987 hit .319 with 24 doubles, one triple and 11 home runs in 89 games.

The next season, 1988, Perezchica split time with the Triple-A Phoenix Firebirds and the Major League Giants. He hit .306 with 18 doubles, 10 triples and nine home runs in 134 games with Phoenix. In limited time at the Major League level, Perezchica had one hit in eight at-bats and seven games. He played six games in the field, two for starts, and they were all at second base.

Perezchica played the 1989 season at the Triple-A level with the Phoenix Firebirds of the Pacific Coast League. He hit .231 with 11 doubles, three triples and eight home runs in 94 games. He did not play at the Major League level in 1989.

In 1990, Perezchica again split the season with the Triple-A Phoenix Firebirds and the Giants. He hit .268 with 22 doubles, six triples and nine home runs. With the Major League club in 1990 Perezchica had one hit in three at-bats. He played two games at second base and two games at shortstop.

He spent his final season in the Giants organization in 1991, splitting the season between the Phoenix Firebirds and the Giants. He hit .293 at Triple-A with 10 doubles, four triples and eight home runs. With the Giants Perezchica batted .229 with four doubles, one triple and three RBIs in 23 games. The Giants then placed Perezchica on waivers.

=== Cleveland Indians ===
On 6 August 1991 the Cleveland Indians claimed Perezchica waivers from the Giants. He spent the final 17 games with Cleveland, batting .364 with eight hits and two doubles.

In 1992, Perezchica split the season between the Indians and the Triple-A Colorado Springs Sky Sox. He hit only .171 at Triple-A with one double, two home runs and nine RBIs. At the Major League level, Perezchica hit .100 with only two hits in 20 at-bats. He was granted free agency after the season.

=== New York Yankees ===
In 1993 he began to play in the New York Yankees organization, splitting the season between the Double-A Albany-Colonie Yankees of the Eastern League and the Triple-A Columbus Clippers of the International League. He hit a combined .321 with 17 doubles, seven triples, 11 home runs, 33 RBIs and one stolen base in 72 games.

In his final season, 1995, Perezchica spent the entire season with the Triple-A Columbus Clippers. He batted .257 with 12 doubles, four triples, seven home runs, 44 RBIs and three stolen bases.

=== Mexican Pacific League ===
Perezchica spent seven seasons in the Mexican Pacific League (LMP), Mexico's winter league, playing for the Potros de Tijuana in the 1987–88 season, and the Naranjeros de Hermosillo from 1990 to 1996.

== Coaching career ==
Perezchica coaching third base for the Diamondbacks

=== New York Yankees ===
Perezchica began his coaching career as the hitting coach for the Double-A Norwich Navigators in 1997 and later coached them in the 2002 season. He also coached the Triple-A Columbus Clippers in 1998 and the Class-A Greensboro Bats from 1999 to 2001.

=== Arizona Diamondbacks ===
He began his managerial career in 2003 with the Rookie-Level Missoula Osprey and then managed the Single-A South Bend Silver Hawks in 2004, the Double-A Tennessee Smokies in 2005 and then served as the Diamondbacks Minor League fielding coordinator.

After the 2016 season, the Diamondbacks hired Perezchica as their third base coach.

=== Houston Astros ===
The Houston Astros hired Perezchica as third base coach on October 24, 2024, succeeding Gary Pettis. Perezchica also assumed roles as infield coach and run prevention coordinator. On October 14, 2026, the Astros announced they would no longer retain Perezchica as third base coach, among a number of changes with the coaching staff.

Sporting positions
Preceded by Matt Williams	Arizona Diamondbacks third base coach 2017—2024	Succeeded by Shaun Larkin
Preceded by Gary Pettis	Houston Astros third base coach 2025—2026	Succeeded by TBA
