= 2027 St. Louis Cardinals season =

Major League Baseball season

2027 St. Louis Cardinals
- League: National League
- Division: Central
- Ballpark: Busch Stadium
- City: St. Louis, Missouri
- Owner: William DeWitt Jr.
- President: Bill DeWitt III
- President of baseball operations: Chaim Bloom
- Manager: Oliver Marmol
- Television: MLB Local Media (Chip Caray, Tom Ackerman, Brad Thompson, Al Hrabosky, Rick Ankiel, Jim Hayes, Scott Warmann, Tom Pagnozzi, Mark Sweeney)
- Radio: KMOX NewsRadio 1120; St. Louis Cardinals Radio Network (John Rooney, Rick Horton, Mike Claiborne)
- Stats: ESPN.com; Baseball Reference

The 2027 St. Louis Cardinals season is scheduled to be the 146th season for the St. Louis Cardinals, a Major League Baseball franchise in St. Louis, Missouri. It would be the 136th season for the Cardinals in the National League, and their 22nd at Busch Stadium III.

The season is contingent on Major League Baseball (MLB) and the Major League Baseball Players Association (MLBPA) signing a new collective bargaining agreement (CBA). Without a new CBA, MLB is expected to lock out the players on December 2, 2026, until one is signed. If such a lockout extends indefinitely, the season could be postponed, shortened, or even cancelled.

== Game log ==
The 2027 schedule is tentative until a new collective bargaining agreement (CBA) is signed between Major League Baseball (MLB) and the Major League Baseball Players Association (MLBPA). If the labor dispute extends into late February or early March, MLB would then start to consider whether to postpone or shorten the season.

The Cardinals are originally scheduled to open their regular season on the road against the Cincinnati Reds on March 25 at Great American Ball Park. Their home opener would then be on April 1 against the Kansas City Royals at Busch Stadium. The season would then end with a September 24–26 home series against the Pittsburgh Pirates.

Legend
Cardinals Win	Cardinals Loss	Game postponed
Boldface text denotes a Cardinals pitcher

2027 St. Louis Cardinals Game Log: 0–0 (Home: 0–0; Away: 0–0)
March/April: 0–0 (Home: 0–0; Road: 0–0)

#	Date	Opponent	Score	Win	Loss	Save	Attendance	Record	Box / Streak
1	March 25	@ Reds	—	—	—	—	—	–	—
2	March 27	@ Reds	—	—	—	—	—	–	—
3	March 28	@ Reds	—	—	—	—	—	–	—
4	March 29	@ Cubs	—	—	—	—	—	–	—
5	March 30	@ Cubs	—	—	—	—	—	–	—
6	March 31	@ Cubs	—	—	—	—	—	–	—
7	April 1	Royals	—	—	—	—	—	–	—
8	April 3	Royals	—	—	—	—	—	–	—
9	April 4	Royals	—	—	—	—	—	–	—
10	April 5	Padres	—	—	—	—	—	–	—
11	April 6	Padres	—	—	—	—	—	–	—
12	April 7	Padres	—	—	—	—	—	–	—
13	April 9	@ Giants	—	—	—	—	—	–	—
14	April 10	@ Giants	—	—	—	—	—	–	—
15	April 11	@ Giants	—	—	—	—	—	–	—
16	April 12	@ Padres	—	—	—	—	—	–	—
17	April 13	@ Padres	—	—	—	—	—	–	—
18	April 14	@ Padres	—	—	—	—	—	–	—
19	April 15	@ Padres	—	—	—	—	—	–	—
20	April 16	@ Rangers	—	—	—	—	—	–	—
21	April 17	@ Rangers	—	—	—	—	—	–	—
22	April 18	@ Rangers	—	—	—	—	—	–	—
23	April 19	Twins	—	—	—	—	—	–	—
24	April 20	Twins	—	—	—	—	—	–	—
25	April 21	Twins	—	—	—	—	—	–	—
26	April 23	Blue Jays	—	—	—	—	—	–	—
27	April 24	Blue Jays	—	—	—	—	—	–	—
28	April 25	Blue Jays	—	—	—	—	—	–	—
29	April 26	Braves	—	—	—	—	—	–	—
30	April 27	Braves	—	—	—	—	—	–	—
31	April 28	Braves	—	—	—	—	—	–	—
32	April 30	@ Red Sox	—	—	—	—	—	–	—

May: 0–0 (Home: 0–0; Road: 0–0)

#	Date	Opponent	Score	Win	Loss	Save	Attendance	Record	Box / Streak
33	May 1	@ Red Sox	—	—	—	—	—	–	—
34	May 2	@ Red Sox	—	—	—	—	—	–	—
35	May 3	@ White Sox	—	—	—	—	—	–	—
36	May 4	@ White Sox	—	—	—	—	—	–	—
37	May 5	@ White Sox	—	—	—	—	—	–	—
38	May 6	Brewers	—	—	—	—	—	–	—
39	May 7	Brewers	—	—	—	—	—	–	—
40	May 8	Brewers	—	—	—	—	—	–	—
41	May 9	Brewers	—	—	—	—	—	–	—
42	May 11	Athletics	—	—	—	—	—	–	—
43	May 12	Athletics	—	—	—	—	—	–	—
44	May 13	Athletics	—	—	—	—	—	–	—
45	May 14	@ Rays	—	—	—	—	—	–	—
46	May 15	@ Rays	—	—	—	—	—	–	—
47	May 16	@ Rays	—	—	—	—	—	–	—
48	May 18	@ Orioles	—	—	—	—	—	–	—
49	May 19	@ Orioles	—	—	—	—	—	–	—
50	May 20	@ Orioles	—	—	—	—	—	–	—
51	May 21	Tigers	—	—	—	—	—	–	—
52	May 22	Tigers	—	—	—	—	—	–	—
53	May 23	Tigers	—	—	—	—	—	–	—
54	May 24	@ Pirates	—	—	—	—	—	–	—
55	May 25	@ Pirates	—	—	—	—	—	–	—
56	May 26	@ Pirates	—	—	—	—	—	–	—
57	May 27	@ Pirates	—	—	—	—	—	–	—
58	May 28	Cubs	—	—	—	—	—	–	—
59	May 29	Cubs	—	—	—	—	—	–	—
60	May 30	Cubs	—	—	—	—	—	–	—
61	May 31	Pirates	—	—	—	—	—	–	—

June: 0–0 (Home: 0–0; Road: 0–0)

#	Date	Opponent	Score	Win	Loss	Save	Attendance	Record	Box / Streak
62	June 1	Pirates	—	—	—	—	—	–	—
63	June 2	Pirates	—	—	—	—	—	–	—
64	June 4	@ Rockies	—	—	—	—	—	–	—
65	June 5	@ Rockies	—	—	—	—	—	–	—
66	June 6	@ Rockies	—	—	—	—	—	–	—
67	June 7	@ Mariners	—	—	—	—	—	–	—
68	June 8	@ Mariners	—	—	—	—	—	–	—
69	June 9	@ Mariners	—	—	—	—	—	–	—
70	June 11	@ Brewers	—	—	—	—	—	–	—
71	June 12	@ Brewers	—	—	—	—	—	–	—
72	June 13	@ Brewers	—	—	—	—	—	–	—
73	June 14	Nationals	—	—	—	—	—	–	—
74	June 15	Nationals	—	—	—	—	—	–	—
75	June 16	Nationals	—	—	—	—	—	–	—
76	June 17	Nationals	—	—	—	—	—	–	—
77	June 18	Reds	—	—	—	—	—	–	—
78	June 19	Reds	—	—	—	—	—	–	—
79	June 20	Reds	—	—	—	—	—	–	—
80	June 22	@ Nationals	—	—	—	—	—	–	—
81	June 23	@ Nationals	—	—	—	—	—	–	—
82	June 24	@ Nationals	—	—	—	—	—	–	—
83	June 25	Mets	—	—	—	—	—	–	—
84	June 26	Mets	—	—	—	—	—	–	—
85	June 27	Mets	—	—	—	—	—	–	—
86	June 28	@ Marlins	—	—	—	—	—	–	—
87	June 29	@ Marlins	—	—	—	—	—	–	—
88	June 30	@ Marlins	—	—	—	—	—	–	—

July: 0–0 (Home: 0–0; Road: 0–0)

#	Date	Opponent	Score	Win	Loss	Save	Attendance	Record	Box / Streak
89	July 1	@ Cubs	—	—	—	—	—	–	—
90	July 2	@ Cubs	—	—	—	—	—	–	—
91	July 3	@ Cubs	—	—	—	—	—	–	—
92	July 4	@ Cubs	—	—	—	—	—	–	—
93	July 6	Diamondbacks	—	—	—	—	—	–	—
94	July 7	Diamondbacks	—	—	—	—	—	–	—
95	July 8	Diamondbacks	—	—	—	—	—	–	—
96	July 9	Yankees	—	—	—	—	—	–	—
97	July 10	Yankees	—	—	—	—	—	–	—
98	July 11	Yankees	—	—	—	—	—	–	—
July 13 **97th All-Star Game in Chicago, Illinois**
99	July 16	@ Royals	—	—	—	—	—	–	—
100	July 17	@ Royals	—	—	—	—	—	–	—
101	July 18	@ Royals	—	—	—	—	—	–	—
102	July 19	@ Diamondbacks	—	—	—	—	—	–	—
103	July 20	@ Diamondbacks	—	—	—	—	—	–	—
104	July 21	@ Diamondbacks	—	—	—	—	—	–	—
105	July 23	Dodgers	—	—	—	—	—	–	—
106	July 24	Dodgers	—	—	—	—	—	–	—
107	July 25	Dodgers	—	—	—	—	—	–	—
108	July 26	Reds	—	—	—	—	—	–	—
109	July 27	Reds	—	—	—	—	—	–	—
110	July 28	Reds	—	—	—	—	—	–	—
111	July 29	Reds	—	—	—	—	—	–	—
112	July 30	@ Braves	—	—	—	—	—	–	—
113	July 31	@ Braves	—	—	—	—	—	–	—

August: 0–0 (Home: 0–0; Road: 0–0)

#	Date	Opponent	Score	Win	Loss	Save	Attendance	Record	Box / Streak
114	August 1	@ Braves	—	—	—	—	—	–	—
115	August 2	@ Phillies	—	—	—	—	—	–	—
116	August 3	@ Phillies	—	—	—	—	—	–	—
117	August 4	@ Phillies	—	—	—	—	—	–	—
118	August 6	Rockies	—	—	—	—	—	–	—
119	August 7	Rockies	—	—	—	—	—	–	—
120	August 8	Rockies	—	—	—	—	—	–	—
121	August 9	Cubs	—	—	—	—	—	–	—
122	August 10	Cubs	—	—	—	—	—	–	—
123	August 11	Cubs	—	—	—	—	—	–	—
124	August 13	@ Mets	—	—	—	—	—	–	—
125	August 14	@ Mets	—	—	—	—	—	–	—
126	August 15	@ Mets	—	—	—	—	—	–	—
127	August 16	@ Guardians	—	—	—	—	—	–	—
128	August 17	@ Guardians	—	—	—	—	—	–	—
129	August 18	@ Guardians	—	—	—	—	—	–	—
130	August 20	Angels	—	—	—	—	—	–	—
131	August 21	Angels	—	—	—	—	—	–	—
132	August 22	Angels	—	—	—	—	—	–	—
133	August 23	Marlins	—	—	—	—	—	–	—
134	August 24	Marlins	—	—	—	—	—	–	—
135	August 25	Marlins	—	—	—	—	—	–	—
136	August 27	@ Brewers	—	—	—	—	—	–	—
137	August 28	@ Brewers	—	—	—	—	—	–	—
138	August 29	@ Brewers	—	—	—	—	—	–	—
139	August 30	@ Dodgers	—	—	—	—	—	–	—
140	August 31	@ Dodgers	—	—	—	—	—	–	—

September: 0–0 (Home: 0–0; Road: 0–0)

#	Date	Opponent	Score	Win	Loss	Save	Attendance	Record	Box / Streak
141	September 1	@ Dodgers	—	—	—	—	—	–	—
142	September 3	Giants	—	—	—	—	—	–	—
143	September 4	Giants	—	—	—	—	—	–	—
144	September 5	Giants	—	—	—	—	—	–	—
145	September 6	Astros	—	—	—	—	—	–	—
146	September 7	Astros	—	—	—	—	—	–	—
147	September 8	Astros	—	—	—	—	—	–	—
148	September 10	Phillies	—	—	—	—	—	–	—
149	September 11	Phillies	—	—	—	—	—	–	—
150	September 12	Phillies	—	—	—	—	—	–	—
151	September 14	@ Pirates	—	—	—	—	—	–	—
152	September 15	@ Pirates	—	—	—	—	—	–	—
153	September 16	@ Pirates	—	—	—	—	—	–	—
154	September 17	@ Reds	—	—	—	—	—	–	—
155	September 18	@ Reds	—	—	—	—	—	–	—
156	September 19	@ Reds	—	—	—	—	—	–	—
157	September 20	Brewers	—	—	—	—	—	–	—
158	September 21	Brewers	—	—	—	—	—	–	—
159	September 22	Brewers	—	—	—	—	—	–	—
160	September 24	Pirates	—	—	—	—	—	–	—
161	September 25	Pirates	—	—	—	—	—	–	—
162	September 26	Pirates	—	—	—	—	—	–	—

== Roster ==
St. Louis Cardinals 2027 spring training roster
40-man roster		Non-roster invitees	Coaches / other
Pitchers: 47 Justin Bruihl; 40 Hunter Dobbins; 64 Ryan Fernandez; 35 Richard Fitts; 72 Luis Gastélum; 44 Gordon Graceffo; 56 Cooper Hjerpe; 62 Kyle Leahy; 32 Matthew Liberatore; 60 Quinn Mathews; 52 Brycen Mautz; 36 Michael McGreevy; 61 Riley O'Brien; -- Jacob Odle; 53 Andre Pallante; 66 Hancel Rincon; -- Eduardo Rivera; 38 Tekoah Roby; 65 George Soriano; 49 Matt Svanson; 63 Cade Winquest	Catchers: 13 Leo Bernal; 8 Jimmy Crooks; 43 Pedro Pagés; Infielders: -- Jesús Báez; 41 Alec Burleson; 33 Blaze Jordan; 31 César Prieto; 25 Thomas Saggese; 26 JJ Wetherholt; 0 Masyn Winn; Outfielders: 22 Joshua Báez; 27 Nathan Church; 15 José Fermín; 21 Everson Pereira; 11 Victor Scott II; 39 Bryan Torres; 18 Jordan Walker; Designated hitters: 48 Iván Herrera	Pitchers: -- Josh Fleming	Manager: 37 Oliver Marmol; Coaches: 87 Brandon Allen (assistant hitting); 90 Dusty Blake (pitching); 88 Casey Chenoweth (assistant hitting); 82 Stubby Clapp (first base); 34 Daniel Descalso (bench); 86 Kyle Driscoll (assistant pitching); 19 Jon Jay (outfield/baserunning/quality control); -- Joel McKeithan (hitting); 94 Jamie Pogue (assistant/bullpen); 74 Julio Rangel (assistant pitching/bullpen); 76 Kleininger Teran (bullpen catcher); 75 Ron 'Pop' Warner (third base); 39 active, 0 inactive, 1 non-roster invitees; 7-, 10-, or 15-day injured list; * Not on active roster; ^{†} Suspended list; Roster, coaches, and NRIs updated November 20, 2026; Transactions • Depth chart; → All MLB rosters

== Minor league system and first-year player draft ==
=== Teams ===
Level	Team	League	Division	Manager	W–L/Stats	Standing	Refs
Triple-A	Memphis Redbirds	International League	West				
Double-A	Ozarks Springbirds	Texas League	North				
High-A	Peoria Chiefs	Midwest League	West				
Single-A	Palm Beach Cardinals	Florida State League	East				
Rookie	FCL Cardinals	Florida Complex League	East				
Foreign Rookie	DSL Cardinals	Dominican Summer League	Boca Chica South				
