= Tanner Swanson =

American baseball coach

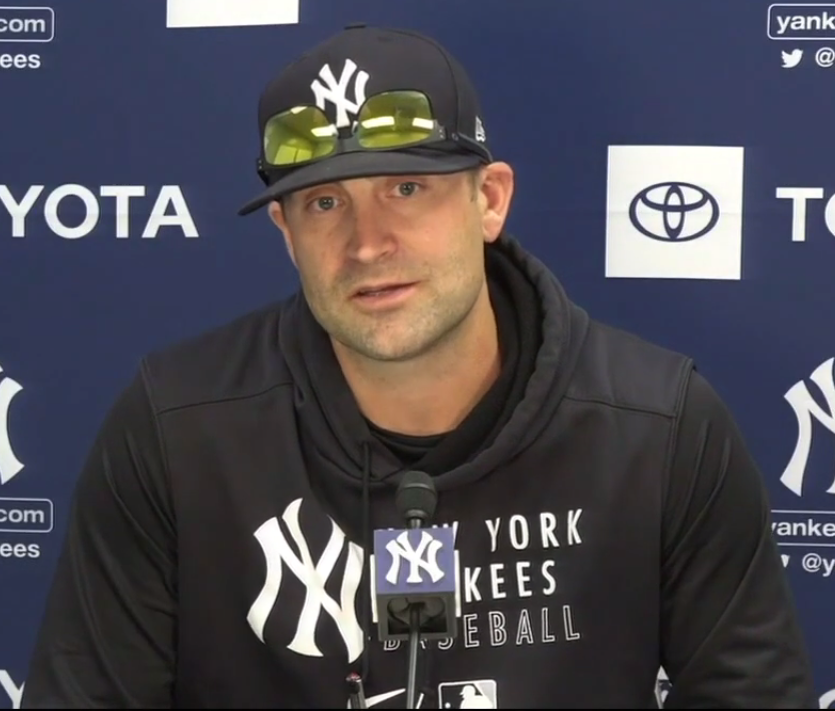
- Swanson with the New York Yankees in 2021

Seattle Mariners
- Coach

Teams
- As coach: Minnesota Twins (2017–2019); New York Yankees (2020–2026); Seattle Mariners (2027–present)

Tanner Swanson is an American professional baseball coach. He is the bench coach for the Seattle Mariners of Major League Baseball (MLB). He previously served as the major league quality control coach and catching coordinator for the New York Yankees, and as the Minor and Major League Catching Coordinator for the Minnesota Twins.

== Career ==
Swanson attended Cle Elum-Roslyn High School in Cle Elum, Washington. He played four years of college baseball. He spent his freshman season at Green River College, sophomore season at Everett Community College, and his final two seasons at Central Washington University. Swanson played as an infielder. He graduated from Central Washington with a Bachelor of Science in Physical Education and School Health.

Swanson spent 2007 and 2008 as a health education teacher and baseball coach at Sultan Senior High School. He was an assistant coach for Everett Community College in 2009. Swanson spent 2010 as an assistant coach, and as a lecturer in the School of Physical Education and School Health at Central Washington University. He then spent the 2011 season as the head baseball coach for Green River College.

Swanson spent 2012 through July 2017 at the University of Washington. He was a graduate manager in 2011–2012, director of baseball operations for part of 2012, and then volunteer assistant coach for the remainder of his time there. While at Washington, Swanson began to focus on coaching catchers. Swanson also founded D1 Catching, an independent catching coaching and consultation business in 2015. He was hired as a full-time assistant coach at Santa Clara University in July 2017. Swanson entered professional baseball when he was hired by the Minnesota Twins as their minor league catching coordinator in November 2017.

In November 2019, Swanson was hired by the New York Yankees to serve as their major league quality control coach and catching coordinator. Swanson's work with Austin Wells is credited with keeping him at the position, when it was expected that he would move to first base or the outfield.

Swanson served as the bench coach for the Great Britain national baseball team in the 2026 World Baseball Classic.

On July 8, 2026, Swanson served as acting manager after manager Aaron Boone and bench coach Brad Ausmus were ejected versus the Tampa Bay Rays.

On November 6, 2026, Swanson was hired by the Seattle Mariners as their bench coach, serving under manager Jason Kanzler. A native of Cle Elum, Washington, Swanson's hiring marked a return to his home state.
