= Bryce Conley =

American baseball player (born 1992)

Seattle Mariners
- Pitcher
- Born: August 22, 1994 (age 32); Raleigh, North Carolina, U.S.
- Bats: Right Throws: Right

Bryce Blackwell Conley (born August 22, 1994) is an American professional baseball pitcher in the Seattle Mariners organization. He is currently a phantom ballplayer, having spent two days on the New York Mets' active roster without making an appearance.

== Career ==
=== Oakland Athletics ===
Conley was selected by the Oakland Athletics in the 22nd round (with the 651st overall selection) of the 2017 Major League Baseball draft. He made his professional debut with the Low–A Vermont Lake Monsters, registering an 0–3 record and 6.12 ERA with 28 strikeouts over 15 games. On April 12, 2018, while playing for the Single–A Beloit Snappers, Conley was the starting pitcher of a no-hitter against the Burlington Bees; Conley tossed the first six innings, and was relieved by Ty Damron and Josh Reagan. He made 20 total appearances (including 16 starts) for Beloit, compiling a 3–7 record and 4.46 ERA with 98 strikeouts across 84 2/3 innings pitched.

On July 22, 2019, Conley was the starting pitcher of another combined no-hitter, against the Rancho Cucamonga Quakes; he tossed the first six innings of the game before being relieved by Eric Marinez and Jake Bray. In 2019, Conley made 25 appearances (19 starts) split between Beloit and the High–A Stockton Ports, accumulating a 6–5 record and 3.43 ERA with 98 strikeouts across 102 1/3 innings pitched. He did not play in a game in 2020 due to the cancellation of the minor league season because of the COVID–19 pandemic.

Conley returned to action in 2021 with the Double–A Midland RockHounds, logging a 5–5 record and 4.39 ERA with 88 strikeouts in 94 1/3 innings pitched across 29 appearances (including 14 starts). He split the 2022 season between Midland and the Triple–A Las Vegas Aviators. In 41 appearances out of the bullpen for the two affiliates, Conley posted a combined 2–5 record and 4.88 ERA with 55 strikeouts and four saves across 55 1/3 innings pitched.

Conley split the 2023 campaign between Las Vegas and the rookie–level Arizona Complex League Athletics, posting a cumulative 1–0 record and 5.91 ERA with 11 strikeouts spanning seven appearances (including one start). He elected free agency following the season on November 6, 2023.

=== Charros de Jalisco ===
On April 16, 2025, after a year of inactivity, Conley signed with the Charros de Jalisco of the Mexican League. Conley made three starts for the Charros, compiling a 1–0 record and 2.03 ERA with 14 strikeouts across 13 1/3 innings pitched.

=== Washington Nationals ===
On May 13, 2025, Conley signed a minor league contract with the Washington Nationals organization. He made 23 appearances (including 22 starts) split between the Double–A Harrisburg Senators and Triple–A Rochester Red Wings, logging a cumulative 4–8 record and 5.01 ERA with 107 strikeouts across 118 2/3 innings pitched. Conley elected free agency following the season on November 6.

=== New York Mets ===
On February 20, 2026, Conley signed a minor league contract with the New York Mets. He made 20 appearances (18 starts) split between the Double–A Binghamton Rumble Ponies and Triple–A Syracuse Mets, accumulating a 2–6 record and 5.89 ERA with 90 strikeouts across 91 2/3 innings pitched. On August 2, Conley was selected to the 40-man roster and promoted to the major leagues for the first time. However, he was designated for assignment on August 4 without having pitched in a game, making him a phantom ballplayer as of that day. Conley cleared waivers and was sent outright to Double–A Binghamton on August 6. He elected free agency on November 2.

=== Seattle Mariners ===
On November 17, 2026, Conley signed a minor league contract with the Seattle Mariners.
