= C. J. Gillman =

American baseball coach (born 1989)

Seattle Mariners
- Coach
- Born: April 20, 1989 (age 37)
- Bats: Switch Throws: Right

Teams
- Seattle Mariners (2027–present)

Charles Heflin Gillman IV (born April 20, 1989) is an American baseball coach who is the hitting coach for the Seattle Mariners of Major League Baseball.

== Playing career ==
Gillman attended Columbine High School in Littleton, Colorado. His father was his high school baseball coach. Gillman played college baseball at Garden City Community College, where he was an all-conference player two times. He then transferred to play for the Dayton Flyers. He set Dayton's single-season hits record with 91. He then played for the Windy City ThunderBolts of the independent Frontier League in 2012 and 2013. In early 2013, he was invited to work out with Colorado Rockies minor league players during spring training.

== Coaching career ==
Gillman was an assistant baseball coach at Dayton in 2014. He was then a coach and recruiting coordinator for the Air Force Falcons through 2019. Gillman joined the Cincinnati Reds in 2020 as a minor league hitting coordinator in 2020, leaving after the 2021 season. He was the Seattle Mariners minor league hitting coordinator from 2022 to 2025. In 2026, he was the Washington Nationals director of hitting.

In November 2026, Gillman became the Mariners hitting coach, replacing Kevin Seitzer.

== Personal life ==
Gillman is married. He has two siblings.

Gillman was high school football teammates with Ryan Miller.
