= Ethan Katz =

American baseball coach (born 1983)

Colorado Rockies
- Coach
- Born: July 4, 1983 (age 43); Los Angeles, California, U.S.
- Bats: Right Throws: Right

Teams
- As coach: San Francisco Giants (2020); Chicago White Sox (2021–2025); Houston Astros (2026); Colorado Rockies (2027–present)

Ethan Russell Katz (born July 4, 1983) is an American former professional baseball pitcher and current pitching coach for the Colorado Rockies of Major League Baseball (MLB). Katz served as the assistant pitching coach of the San Francisco Giants in the 2020 season and the pitching coach of the Chicago White Sox from 2021 through 2025. He attended East Los Angeles College, and then Sacramento State for college baseball.

== Playing career ==
Katz was born in Los Angeles, California. Katz is of Jewish background. He attended University High School in West Los Angeles, California. There, he was All-City, League MVP, and All-League.

Katz was drafted by the Seattle Mariners in the 47th round of the 2001 MLB draft, but did not sign. Instead he attended East Los Angeles College for one season, before transferring to Sacramento State for two seasons of college baseball. He was drafted by the Colorado Rockies in the 26th round of the 2005 MLB draft.

Katz played in the Rockies organization from 2005 through 2008. In 2005 with the Tri-City Dust Devils of the Low-A Northwest League he was 4–1 with a 2.35 ERA in 21 games (7 starts). In 2006 back with the Dust Devils, Katz logged a 4–4 record with a 2.15 ERA in 29 games (one start), and with the Asheville Tourists of the Single-A South Atlantic League he was 2–0 with a 6.05 ERA in 11 relief appearances. In 2007, back with the Tourists he was 3–2 with a 2.96 ERA in 19 relief appearances. Katz split 2008 between the Dust Devils, for whom he recorded a 1.08 ERA in 8 relief appearances, and the Tourists, for whom he posted a 3.00 ERA in 14 relief appearances. He then played for the Victoria Seals of the Golden Baseball League in 2009, for whom he was 1–3 with a 6.75 ERA in 27 relief appearances.

== Coaching career ==
Katz's first coaching position was as the pitching coach at Harvard-Westlake High School in North Hollywood, California, from September 2009 to July 2013, where he helped coach future major league pitchers Max Fried, Lucas Giolito, and Jack Flaherty. He served as the pitching coach for the collegiate summer baseball league La Crosse Loggers of the Northwoods League for the 2011 and 2012 seasons.

He joined the Los Angeles Angels organization, and served as the pitching coach for the Rookie-level Arizona League Angels in 2013 and for the Burlington Bees of the Single–A Midwest League in 2014 and 2015. Katz then spent the 2016 through 2018 seasons as a pitching coach in the Seattle Mariners organization, in 2016 for the Bakersfield Blaze of the High–A California League, where he was named Coach of the Year, and in 2017–18 for the Arkansas Travelers of the Double–A Texas League.

Katz was hired by the San Francisco Giants and served as their assistant minor league pitching coordinator in 2019.

On December 11, 2019, Katz was promoted by the Giants to be their assistant pitching coach.

On November 12, 2020, Katz was hired by the Chicago White Sox to be their pitching coach. Katz was referred to the White Sox by star pitcher Lucas Giolito, who played for Katz at Harvard-Westlake High School in California. He was let go by the White Sox following the 2025 season.

On November 26, 2025, the Houston Astros hired Katz as their assistant pitching coach.

On November 2, 2026, the Colorado Rockies hired Katz as their pitching coach.

Sporting positions
Preceded by Bill Murphy	Houston Astros assistant pitching/bullpen coach 2026—present	Succeeded by Incumbent
