= Grant McCray =

American baseball player (born 2000)

Seattle Mariners
- Outfielder
- Born: December 7, 2000 (age 25); Billings, Montana, U.S.
- Bats: Left Throws: Right

MLB debut
- August 14, 2024, for the San Francisco Giants

MLB statistics (through 2026 season)
- Batting average: .170
- Home runs: 7
- Runs batted in: 16
- Stats at Baseball Reference

Teams
- San Francisco Giants (2024–2026)

Grant Snow McCray (born December 7, 2000) is an American professional baseball outfielder for the Seattle Mariners of Major League Baseball (MLB). He made his MLB debut for the San Francisco Giants in 2024.

== Career ==
=== Early life ===
McCray was born in Billings, Montana, while his father, Rodney, was coaching for the minor-league Billings Mustangs. He attended Lakewood Ranch High School in Bradenton, Florida.

=== San Francisco Giants ===
McCray was drafted by the San Francisco Giants in the third round, with the 87th overall selection, of the 2019 Major League Baseball draft. He made his professional debut with the rookie-level Arizona League Giants, batting to a .270/.379/.335 slash line in 185 at bats. He did not play in a game in 2020 due to the cancellation of the minor league season because of the COVID-19 pandemic. McCray returned to action in 2021 to play for the rookie-level Arizona Complex League Giants and Single-A San Jose Giants, batting a combined .274/.342/.422 in 135 at bats.

McCray started 2022 with San Jose, with whom he batted .291/.383/.525 (eighth in the California League) in 436 at bats, with 92 runs (second), nine triples (second), 21 home runs (third), 69 runs batted in (RBI, 10th), and 35 stolen bases (fifth) while being caught 10 times (second), and 148 strikeouts (sixth). He also had 52 at bats for the High-A Eugene Emeralds, batting .269/.387/.423. McCray spent the entire 2023 campaign with Eugene, playing in 127 games and slashing .255/.360/.417 with 14 home runs, 66 RBI, and 52 stolen bases.

McCray began the 2024 campaign with the Double-A Richmond Flying Squirrels, and was promoted to the Triple-A Sacramento River Cats in June. In 97 games split between the two teams, he slashed .242/.330/.446 with 12 home runs, 53 RBI, and 14 stolen bases. On August 14, McCray was selected to the 40-man roster and promoted to the major leagues for the first time. He made his major league debut that night and recorded his first hit and home run the following day. In 37 games for San Francisco during his rookie campaign, McCray batted .202/.238/.379 with five home runs, 10 RBI, and five stolen bases.

McCray was optioned to Triple-A Sacramento to begin the 2025 season. McCray played in 22 games for San Francisco, going 2-for-22 (.091) with two RBI and two walks.

McCray was again optioned to Triple-A to begin the 2026 season. On June 2, McCray was diagnosed with a fractured hamate bone in his left wrist that would require surgery. He returned to the Giants on July 10. He batted .143 with two home runs in 43 games in his third MLB season.

=== Seattle Mariners ===
On October 29, 2026, McCray was claimed off of waivers by the Seattle Mariners.

== Personal life ==
McCray's father, Rodney McCray, played in MLB. He is friends with former MLB player Dee Strange-Gordon, who he met while his father coached in Minor League Baseball.

McCray has three sisters, one of whom played college softball for the Grand Canyon Antelopes.
