= 2026 Chicago White Sox season =

2026 Chicago White Sox
- American League Wild Card winners
- League: American League
- Division: Central
- Ballpark: Rate Field
- City: Chicago
- Record: 84–78 (.519)
- Divisional place: 2nd
- Owner: Jerry Reinsdorf
- General manager: Chris Getz
- Manager: Will Venable
- Television: Chicago Sports Network
- Radio: ESPN Chicago; Chicago White Sox Radio Network
- Stats: ESPN.com; Baseball Reference

The 2026 Chicago White Sox season was the club's 127th season in Chicago, their 126th in the American League and their 36th at Rate Field. The White Sox improved on their 60–102 record from the previous season.

The White Sox achieved multiple successes in 2026. They ended their streak of three consecutive 100+ loss seasons. They also ended their three losing seasons when they won their 81st game. Two days later, they became the first team in MLB history to clinch the MLB playoffs after three straight seasons with 100+ loss seasons.

Despite these improvements, they lost their American League Central division lead they held for much of the season in late September to the Guardians, which also prevented them from having a first-round bye. This forced them to settle for the final spot in the American League Wild Card Series, where they played the Houston Astros in their first playoff series since 2021. Despite having struggled against the Astros during the regular season, the White Sox swept Houston in two games, never trailing in either one, for their first postseason series win since the 2005 World Series, coincidentally also against Houston (who at the time were in the National League). They then faced the division rival Guardians in the American League Division Series, losing in five games despite leading the series 2–0.

== Regular season ==
=== Season standings ===
==== American League Central ====
AL Central
| Team | W | L | Pct. | GB | Home | Road |
|---|---|---|---|---|---|---|
| Cleveland Guardians | 85 | 77 | .525 | — | 41‍–‍40 | 44‍–‍37 |
| Chicago White Sox | 84 | 78 | .519 | 1 | 48‍–‍33 | 36‍–‍45 |
| Minnesota Twins | 77 | 85 | .475 | 8 | 42‍–‍39 | 35‍–‍46 |
| Detroit Tigers | 76 | 86 | .469 | 9 | 42‍–‍39 | 34‍–‍47 |
| Kansas City Royals | 69 | 93 | .426 | 16 | 41‍–‍40 | 28‍–‍53 |

==== American League Wild Card ====
Division leaders
| Team | W | L | Pct. |
|---|---|---|---|
| Tampa Bay Rays | 98 | 64 | .605 |
| Cleveland Guardians | 85 | 77 | .525 |
| Houston Astros | 81 | 81 | .500 |

Wild Card teams (Top 3 teams qualify for postseason)
| Team | W | L | Pct. | GB |
|---|---|---|---|---|
| New York Yankees | 93 | 68 | .578 | +9½ |
| Boston Red Sox | 87 | 75 | .537 | +3 |
| Chicago White Sox | 84 | 78 | .519 | — |
| Texas Rangers | 80 | 82 | .494 | 4 |
| Baltimore Orioles | 79 | 82 | .491 | 4½ |
| Toronto Blue Jays | 79 | 83 | .488 | 5 |
| Minnesota Twins | 77 | 85 | .475 | 7 |
| Detroit Tigers | 76 | 86 | .469 | 8 |
| Seattle Mariners | 76 | 86 | .469 | 8 |
| Kansas City Royals | 69 | 93 | .426 | 15 |
| Athletics | 64 | 98 | .395 | 20 |
| Los Angeles Angels | 62 | 100 | .383 | 22 |

==== Records vs. Opponents ====
2026 American League record Source: MLB Standings Grid – 2026
| Team | ATH | BAL | BOS | CWS | CLE | DET | HOU | KC | LAA | MIN | NYY | SEA | TB | TEX | TOR | NL |
|---|---|---|---|---|---|---|---|---|---|---|---|---|---|---|---|---|
| Athletics | — | 2–4 | 3–4 | 1–5 | 1–5 | 0–6 | 6–7 | 2–5 | 8–5 | 3–3 | 3–3 | 7–6 | 0–6 | 7–6 | 2–4 | 19–29 |
| Baltimore | 4–2 | — | 4–9 | 4–2 | 3–4 | 4–2 | 5–1 | 5–1 | 3–3 | 3–3 | 3–9 | 3–4 | 8–5 | 2–4 | 7–6 | 21–27 |
| Boston | 4–3 | 9–4 | — | 6–0 | 3–3 | 5–2 | 1–5 | 5–1 | 4–2 | 1–5 | 6–7 | 3–3 | 6–7 | 3–3 | 4–9 | 27–21 |
| Chicago | 5–1 | 2–4 | 0–6 | — | 7–6 | 9–4 | 2–5 | 9–4 | 4–2 | 8–5 | 3–4 | 3–3 | 2–4 | 4–2 | 5–1 | 21–27 |
| Cleveland | 5–1 | 4–3 | 3–3 | 6–7 | — | 10–3 | 2–4 | 7–6 | 6–0 | 6–7 | 2–4 | 4–3 | 1–5 | 2–4 | 2–4 | 25–23 |
| Detroit | 6–0 | 2–4 | 2–5 | 4–9 | 3–10 | — | 2–5 | 6–7 | 3–3 | 5–8 | 4–2 | 4–2 | 4–2 | 4–2 | 3–3 | 24–24 |
| Houston | 7–6 | 1–5 | 5–1 | 5–2 | 4–2 | 5–2 | — | 4–2 | 7–6 | 2–4 | 3–3 | 3–10 | 2–4 | 9–4 | 3–3 | 21–27 |
| Kansas City | 5–2 | 1–5 | 1–5 | 4–9 | 6–7 | 7–6 | 2–4 | — | 5–1 | 8–5 | 0–6 | 5–1 | 2–5 | 1–5 | 3–3 | 19–29 |
| Los Angeles | 5–8 | 3–3 | 2–4 | 2–4 | 0–6 | 3–3 | 6–7 | 1–5 | — | 3–4 | 3–4 | 6–7 | 3–3 | 8–5 | 2–4 | 15–33 |
| Minnesota | 3–3 | 3–3 | 5–1 | 5–8 | 7–6 | 8–5 | 4–2 | 5–8 | 4–3 | — | 3–3 | 2–4 | 1–5 | 5–1 | 4–3 | 18–30 |
| New York | 3–3 | 9–3 | 7–6 | 4–3 | 4–2 | 2–4 | 3–3 | 6–0 | 4–3 | 3–3 | — | 4–2 | 6–7 | 4–2 | 7–6 | 27–21 |
| Seattle | 6–7 | 4–3 | 3–3 | 3–3 | 3–4 | 2–4 | 10–3 | 1–5 | 7–6 | 4–2 | 2–4 | — | 1–5 | 5–8 | 2–4 | 23–25 |
| Tampa Bay | 6–0 | 5–8 | 7–6 | 4–2 | 5–1 | 2–4 | 4–2 | 5–2 | 3–3 | 5–1 | 7–6 | 5–1 | — | 4–3 | 9–4 | 27–21 |
| Texas | 6–7 | 4–2 | 3–3 | 2–4 | 4–2 | 2–4 | 4–9 | 5–1 | 5–8 | 1–5 | 2–4 | 8–5 | 3–4 | — | 6–1 | 25–23 |
| Toronto | 4–2 | 6–7 | 9–4 | 1–5 | 4–2 | 3–3 | 3–3 | 3–3 | 4–2 | 3–4 | 6–7 | 4–2 | 4–9 | 1–6 | — | 24–24 |

Updated with the results of all games through September 27, 2026.

=== Game log ===
Legend
| | White Sox win |
| | White Sox loss |
| | Postponement |
| | Clinched playoff spot |
| **Bold** | White Sox team member |

2026 regular season game log: 84–78 (Home: 48–33; Away: 36–45)
March/April: 14–17 (Home: 7–8; Away: 7–9)

| # | Date | Opponent | Time (CT) | Score | Win | Loss | Save | Attendance | Record | Streak |
|---|---|---|---|---|---|---|---|---|---|---|
| 1 | March 26 | @ Brewers | 1:10 pm | 2–14 | Misiorowski (1–0) | **S. Smith** (0–1) | ― | 43,001 | 0–1 | L1 |
| 2 | March 28 | @ Brewers | 6:10 pm | 1–6 | Ashby (1–0) | **Burke** (0–1) | ― | 36,030 | 0–2 | L2 |
| 3 | March 29 | @ Brewers | 1:10 pm | 7–9 | Woodford (1–0) | **Domínguez** (0–1) | Megill (1) | 32,737 | 0–3 | L3 |
| 4 | March 30 | @ Marlins | 5:40 pm | 9–4 | **Martin** (1–0) | Paddack (0–1) | ― | 6,515 | 1–3 | W1 |
| 5 | March 31 | @ Marlins | 5:40 pm | 2–9 | Bender (1–0) | **Fedde** (0–1) | ― | 6,667 | 1–4 | L1 |
| 6 | April 1 | @ Marlins | 12:10 pm | 0–10 | Alcántara (2–0) | **S. Smith** (0–2) | ― | 6,505 | 1–5 | L2 |
| — | April 2 | Blue Jays | **Postponed (rain)** (Makeup date: April 3) | | | | | | | |
| 7 | April 3 | Blue Jays | 1:10 pm | 5–4 (10) | **Domínguez** (1–1) | Hoffman (1–1) | ― | 33,171 | 2–5 | W1 |
| 8 | April 4 | Blue Jays | 1:10 pm | 6–3 | **Murphy** (1–0) | Little (0–2) | **Domínguez** (1) | 18,389 | 3–5 | W2 |
| 9 | April 5 | Blue Jays | 1:10 pm | 3–0 | **Martin** (2–0) | Lauer (1–1) | **Murphy** (1) | 22,326 | 4–5 | W3 |
| 10 | April 6 | Orioles | 6:40 pm | 1–2 | Young (1–0) | **Fedde** (0–2) | Helsley (3) | 17,221 | 4–6 | L1 |
| 11 | April 7 | Orioles | 2:10 pm | 2–4 | Canó (1–1) | **Hicks** (0–1) | Helsley (4) | 10,750 | 4–7 | L2 |
| 12 | April 8 | Orioles | 1:10 pm | 3–5 | Bradish (1–2) | **Sims** (0–1) | Garcia (1) | 10,133 | 4–8 | L3 |
| 13 | April 9 | @ Royals | 6:40 pm | 2–0 | **Kay** (1–0) | Lugo (1–1) | **Domínguez** (2) | 13,001 | 5–8 | W1 |
| 14 | April 10 | @ Royals | 6:40 pm | 0–2 | Bubic (2–1) | **Martin** (2–1) | Erceg (4) | 12,907 | 5–9 | L1 |
| 15 | April 11 | @ Royals | 3:10 pm | 0–2 | Wacha (2–0) | **Fedde** (0–3) | Erceg (5) | 16,214 | 5–10 | L2 |
| 16 | April 12 | @ Royals | 1:10 pm | 6–5 | **Leasure** (1–0) | Schreiber (0–2) | **Domínguez** (3) | 20,552 | 6–10 | W1 |
| 17 | April 14 | Rays | 6:40 pm | 5–8 | McClanahan (1–1) | **Schultz** (0–1) | Baker (3) | 14,648 | 6–11 | L1 |
| 18 | April 15 | Rays | 6:40 pm | 3–8 | Scholtens (1–0) | **Burke** (0–2) | ― | 10,193 | 6–12 | L2 |
| 19 | April 16 | Rays | 1:10 pm | 3–5 | Kelly (2–1) | **Domínguez** (1–2) | Baker (4) | 10,128 | 6–13 | L3 |
| 20 | April 17 | @ Athletics | 8:40 pm | 9–2 | **Martin** (3–1) | Civale (2–1) | ― | 12,027 | 7–13 | W1 |
| 21 | April 18 | @ Athletics | 3:05 pm | 6–7 (11) | Perkins (2–0) | **Sims** (0–2) | ― | 11,131 | 7–14 | L1 |
| 22 | April 19 | @ Athletics | 3:05 pm | 7–4 | **Schultz** (1–1) | Springs (3–1) | **Domínguez** (4) | 12,070 | 8–14 | W1 |
| 23 | April 21 | @ Diamondbacks | 8:40 pm | 11–5 | **Burke** (1–2) | Kelly (1–1) | ― | 23,045 | 9–14 | W2 |
| 24 | April 22 | @ Diamondbacks | 8:40 pm | 7–11 | Rodríguez (2–0) | **Kay** (1–1) | ― | 20,799 | 9–15 | L1 |
| 25 | April 23 | @ Diamondbacks | 2:40 pm | 4–1 | **Taylor** (1–0) | Sewald (0–3) | **Domínguez** (5) | 20,405 | 10–15 | W1 |
| 26 | April 24 | Nationals | 6:40 pm | 5–4 | **Leasure** (2–0) | Cornelio (0–1) | **Domínguez** (6) | 17,588 | 11–15 | W2 |
| 27 | April 25 | Nationals | 3:10 pm | 3–6 (10) | Pérez (2–3) | **Leasure** (2–1) | ― | 35,174 | 11–16 | L1 |
| 28 | April 26 | Nationals | 1:10 pm | 1–2 (10) | Lovelady (2–1) | **Domínguez** (1–3) | Schultz (1) | 24,259 | 11–17 | L2 |
| 29 | April 27 | Angels | 6:40 pm | 8–7 | **Bido** (2–0) | Sandlin (0–1) | **Hudson** (1) | 10,193 | 12–17 | W1 |
| 30 | April 28 | Angels | 6:40 pm | 5–2 | **Martin** (4–1) | Soriano (5–1) | **Domínguez** (7) | 11,857 | 13–17 | W2 |
| 31 | April 29 | Angels | 12:10 pm | 3–2 (10) | **Domínguez** (2–3) | Pomeranz (0–3) | ― | 15,901 | 14–17 | W3 |

May: 18–10 (Home: 13–3; Away: 5–7)

| # | Date | Opponent | Time (CT) | Score | Win | Loss | Save | Attendance | Record | Streak |
|---|---|---|---|---|---|---|---|---|---|---|
| 32 | May 1 | @ Padres | 8:40 pm | 8–2 | **Schultz** (2–1) | Márquez (3–2) | – | 43,638 | 15–17 | W4 |
| 33 | May 2 | @ Padres | 7:40 pm | 4–0 | **Burke** (2–2) | King (3–2) | **Domínguez** (8) | 42,758 | 16–17 | W5 |
| 34 | May 3 | @ Padres | 3:10 pm | 3–4 | Adam (1–0) | **Davis** (0–1) | Miller (11) | 40,171 | 16–18 | L1 |
| 35 | May 4 | @ Angels | 8:38 pm | 6–0 | **Martin** (5–1) | Soriano (5–2) | ― | 26,262 | 17–18 | W1 |
| 36 | May 5 | @ Angels | 8:38 pm | 3–4 | Fermín (1–1) | **Fedde** (0–4) | Zeferjahn (1) | 26,892 | 17–19 | L1 |
| 37 | May 6 | @ Angels | 3:07 pm | 2–8 | Ureña (1–3) | **Schultz** (2–2) | ― | 23,338 | 17–20 | L2 |
| 38 | May 8 | Mariners | 6:40 pm | 8–12 | Hancock (3–1) | **Burke** (2–3) | ― | 23,011 | 17–21 | L3 |
| 39 | May 9 | Mariners | 6:10 pm | 6–1 | **Kay** (2–1) | Castillo (0–4) | ― | 25,438 | 18–21 | W1 |
| 40 | May 10 | Mariners | 1:10 pm | 2–1 | **Hudson** (1–0) | Bazardo (2–2) | **Domínguez** (9) | 19,247 | 19–21 | W2 |
| 41 | May 12 | Royals | 6:40 pm | 6–5 | **Domínguez** (3–3) | Strahm (1–1) | **Hudson** (2) | 13,256 | 20–21 | W3 |
| 42 | May 13 | Royals | 6:40 pm | 6–5 | **Davis** (1–1) | Lugo (1–3) | **Domínguez** (10) | 11,905 | 21–21 | W4 |
| 43 | May 14 | Royals | 6:40 pm | 6–2 | **Kay** (3–1) | Bubic (3–2) | **Newcomb** (1) | 14,913 | 22–21 | W5 |
| 44 | May 15 | Cubs | 6:40 pm | 5–10 | Thornton (2–0) | **Hudson** (1–1) | ― | 38,723 | 22–22 | L1 |
| 45 | May 16 | Cubs | 6:10 pm | 8–3 | **Martin** (6–1) | Taillon (2–3) | ― | 38,795 | 23–22 | W1 |
| 46 | May 17 | Cubs | 1:10 pm | 9–8 (10) | **Davis** (2–1) | Rolison (3–1) | ― | 38,608 | 24–22 | W2 |
| 47 | May 18 | @ Mariners | 8:40 pm | 1–6 | Woo (4–2) | **Schultz** (2–3) | ― | 31,409 | 24–23 | L1 |
| 48 | May 19 | @ Mariners | 8:40 pm | 2–1 | **Hudson** (2–1) | Castillo (1–5) | **Taylor** (1) | 28,837 | 25–23 | W1 |
| 49 | May 20 | @ Mariners | 3:10 pm | 4–5 | Brash (3–0) | **Newcomb** (0–1) | Ferrer (3) | 24,492 | 25–24 | L1 |
| 50 | May 22 | @ Giants | 9:15 pm | 9–4 | **Martin** (7–1) | McDonald (2–1) | ― | 37,524 | 26–24 | W1 |
| 51 | May 23 | @ Giants | 3:05 pm | 3–10 | Gage (4–1) | **Fedde** (0–5) | ― | 40,172 | 26–25 | L1 |
| 52 | May 24 | @ Giants | 3:05 pm | 5–8 | Winn (1–1) | **Schultz** (2–4) | Kilian (3) | 40,220 | 26–26 | L2 |
| 53 | May 25 | Twins | 1:10 pm | 3–1 | **Kay** (4–1) | Matthews (1–2) | **Domínguez** (11) | 30,114 | 27–26 | W1 |
| 54 | May 26 | Twins | 6:40 pm | 3–5 (11) | Rogers (1–1) | **Davis** (2–2) | Gómez (3) | 15,432 | 27–27 | L1 |
| 55 | May 27 | Twins | 6:40 pm | 15–2 | **Sandlin** (1–0) | Prielipp (1–3) | ― | 14,796 | 28–27 | W1 |
| 56 | May 28 | Twins | 1:10 pm | 6–2 | **Martin** (8–1) | Woods Richardson (0–7) | – | 14,194 | 29–27 | W2 |
| 57 | May 29 | Tigers | 6:40 pm | 4–3 (10) | **Hudson** (3–1) | Anderson (2–2) | – | 30,019 | 30–27 | W3 |
| 58 | May 30 | Tigers | 1:10 pm | 7–1 | **Kay** (5–1) | Valdez (2–4) | – | 29,435 | 31–27 | W4 |
| 59 | May 31 | Tigers | 1:10 pm | 2–1 | **Eisert** (1–0) | Anderson (2–3) | **Davis** (1) | 28,764 | 32–27 | W5 |

June: 13–12 (Home: 8–3; Away: 5–9)

| # | Date | Opponent | Time (CT) | Score | Win | Loss | Save | Attendance | Record | Streak |
|---|---|---|---|---|---|---|---|---|---|---|
| 60 | June 1 | @ Twins | 6:40 pm | 6–9 | Ryan (4–3) | **Sandlin** (1–1) | ― | 12,525 | 32–28 | L1 |
| 61 | June 2 | @ Twins | 6:40 pm | 4–6 | Prielipp (2–3) | **Martin** (8–2) | Gómez (4) | 15,358 | 32–29 | L2 |
| 62 | June 3 | @ Twins | 12:40 pm | 8–0 | **Fedde** (1–5) | Bradley (5–2) | ― | 20,322 | 33–29 | W1 |
| 63 | June 5 | @ Phillies | 5:40 pm | 6–8 | Bowlan (2–0) | **Hudson** (3–2) | Durán (15) | 43,232 | 33–30 | L1 |
| 64 | June 6 | @ Phillies | 3:05 pm | 6–3 | **Burke** (3–3) | Painter (1–7) | **Taylor** (2) | 42,949 | 34–30 | W1 |
| 65 | June 7 | @ Phillies | 12:35 pm | 5–9 | Alvarado (3–1) | **Davis** (2–3) | ― | 41,978 | 34–31 | L1 |
| 66 | June 9 | Braves | 6:40 pm | 6–5 (10) | **Taylor** (2–0) | Iglesias (0–1) | ― | 20,494 | 35–31 | W1 |
| 67 | June 10 | Braves | 6:40 pm | 2–1 | **Martin** (9–2) | Sale (8–5) | **Hudson** (3) | 14,622 | 36–31 | W2 |
| — | June 11 | Braves | **Postponed (rain)** (Makeup date: August 20) | | | | | | | |
| 68 | June 12 | Dodgers | 6:40 pm | 8–2 | **Kay** (6–1) | Sasaki (3–4) | ― | 37,882 | 37–31 | W3 |
| 69 | June 13 | Dodgers | 3:10 pm | 1–7 | Yamamoto (7–4) | **Burke** (3–4) | ― | 37,832 | 37–32 | L1 |
| 70 | June 14 | Dodgers | 1:10 pm | 6–4 | **Fedde** (2–5) | Sheehan (3–4) | **Domínguez** (12) | 38,507 | 38–32 | W1 |
| 71 | June 16 | @ Yankees | 6:05 pm | 2–12 | Cole (2–1) | **Martin** (9–3) | Yarbrough (2) | 36,723 | 38–33 | L1 |
| 72 | June 17 | @ Yankees | 6:05 pm | 5–10 | Rodón (3–2) | **Kay** (6–2) | ― | 38,558 | 38–34 | L2 |
| 73 | June 18 | @ Yankees | 6:05 pm | 5–1 | **Burke** (4–4) | Cruz (4–2) | ― | 44,809 | 39–34 | W1 |
| 74 | June 19 | @ Tigers | 5:40 pm | 3–4 | Anderson (3–3) | **Fedde** (2–6) | Jansen (8) | 41,353 | 39–35 | L1 |
| 75 | June 20 | @ Tigers | 12:10 pm | 1–4 | Melton (4–0) | **Rock** (0–1) | Jansen (9) | 34,692 | 39–36 | L2 |
| 76 | June 21 | @ Tigers | 12:40 pm | 4–5 (10) | Vest (3–4) | **Eisert** (1–1) | ― | 40,021 | 39–37 | L3 |
| 77 | June 22 | Guardians | 6:40 pm | 6–5 | **Murphy** (2–0) | Smith (2–1) | ― | 23,151 | 40–37 | W1 |
| 78 | June 23 | Guardians | 6:40 pm | 2–1 | **Burke** (5–4) | Messick (7–4) | **Newcomb** (2) | 28,883 | 41–37 | W2 |
| 79 | June 24 | Guardians | 1:10 pm | 3–4 (10) | Armstrong (2–1) | **Taylor** (2–1) | ― | 17,664 | 41–38 | L1 |
| 80 | June 26 | Royals | 6:40 pm | 22–1 | **Sandlin** (2–1) | Spence (0–2) | ― | 31,130 | 42–38 | W1 |
| 81 | June 27 | Royals | 3:10 pm | 2–1 | **Taylor** (3–1) | Lynch (2–2) | ― | 28,569 | 43–38 | W2 |
| 82 | June 28 | Royals | 1:10 pm | 4–5 | Cruz (2–2) | **Kay** (6–3) | Lange (7) | 27,301 | 43–39 | L1 |
| 83 | June 29 | @ Orioles | 5:35 pm | 8–2 | **Taylor** (4–1) | Wolfram (1–2) | ― | 17,146 | 44–39 | W1 |
| 84 | June 30 | @ Orioles | 5:35 pm | 9–3 | **Fedde** (3–6) | Gibson (1–3) | **Schweitzer** (1) | 17,581 | 45–39 | W2 |

July: 13–12 (Home: 6–7; Away: 7–5)

| # | Date | Opponent | Time (CT) | Score | Win | Loss | Save | Attendance | Record | Streak |
|---|---|---|---|---|---|---|---|---|---|---|
| 85 | July 1 | @ Orioles | 11:35 am | 1–6 | Kremer (1–1) | **Schultz** (2–5) | ― | 19,045 | 45–40 | L1 |
| 86 | July 2 | @ Guardians | 5:40 pm | 5–6 | Herrin (1–3) | **Taylor** (4–2) | ― | 22,556 | 45–41 | L2 |
| 87 | July 3 | @ Guardians | 6:10 pm | 3–4 (10) | Sabrowski (3–1) | **Newcomb** (0–2) | ― | 33,646 | 45–42 | L3 |
| 88 | July 4 | @ Guardians | 6:10 pm | 3–1 | **Eisert** (2–1) | Herrin (1–4) | **Taylor** (3) | 31,727 | 46–42 | W1 |
| 89 | July 5 | @ Guardians | 1:00 pm | 7–6 | **Fedde** (4–6) | Holderman (4–2) | **Newcomb** (3) | 22,616 | 47–42 | W2 |
| 90 | July 7 | Red Sox | 6:40 pm | 1–8 | Tolle (5–6) | **Schultz** (2–6) | ― | 25,392 | 47–43 | L1 |
| 91 | July 8 | Red Sox | 6:40 pm | 0–5 | Bennett (4–3) | **Martin** (9–4) | ― | 23,973 | 47–44 | L2 |
| 92 | July 9 | Red Sox | 1:10 pm | 1–2 | Guerrero (1–1) | **Kay** (6–4) | Chapman (19) | 19,148 | 47–45 | L3 |
| 93 | July 10 | Athletics | 6:40 pm | 14–1 | **Burke** (6–4) | Civale (5–7) | ― | 37,539 | 48–45 | W1 |
| 94 | July 11 | Athletics | 1:10 pm | 1–0 | **Fedde** (5–6) | Jump (3–4) | **Taylor** (4) | 22,742 | 49–45 | W2 |
| 95 | July 12 | Athletics | 1:10 pm | 9–1 | **Schultz** (3–6) | Ginn (7–6) | ― | 27,175 | 50–45 | W3 |
| — | July 14 | **96th All-Star Game in Philadelphia, PA** | | | | | | | | |
| 96 | July 17 | @ Blue Jays | 6:15 pm | 12–4 | **Schweitzer** (1–0) | Miles (4–2) | ― | 41,895 | 51–45 | W4 |
| 97 | July 18 | @ Blue Jays | 2:07 pm | 0–1 | Bieber (1–1) | **Martin** (9–4) | Varland (20) | 41,775 | 51–46 | L1 |
| 98 | July 19 | @ Blue Jays | 11:15 am | 3–0 | **Burke** (7–4) | Yesavage (4–5) | **Taylor** (5) | 41,288 | 52–46 | W1 |
| 99 | July 20 | @ Rangers | 7:05 pm | 10–3 | **Murphy** (3–0) | deGrom (7–6) | ― | 28,506 | 53–46 | W2 |
| 100 | July 21 | @ Rangers | 7:05 pm | 0–10 | Rocker (3–8) | **Schultz** (3–7) | Gonzales (1) | 26,108 | 53–47 | L1 |
| 101 | July 22 | @ Rangers | 7:05 pm | 4–2 | **Kay** (4–2) | Quantrill (3–3) | **Hudson** (4) | 31,127 | 54–47 | W1 |
| 102 | July 24 | Astros | 6:40 pm | 5–9 | Teng (5–6) | **Hudson** (3–3) | ― | 28,657 | 54–48 | L1 |
| 103 | July 25 | Astros | 6:10 pm | 1–4 | Brown (2–1) | **Burke** (7–5) | Hader (12) | 30,029 | 54–49 | L2 |
| 104 | July 26 | Astros | 1:10 pm | 12–3 | **Newcomb** (1–2) | Blanco (0–1) | ― | 32,581 | 55–49 | W1 |
| 105 | July 27 | Yankees | 6:40 pm | 5–9 | Headrick (6–1) | **Hudson** (3–4) | Bednar (21) | 22,357 | 55–50 | L1 |
| 106 | July 28 | Yankees | 6:40 pm | 2–3 | Cole (4–5) | **Kay** (7–5) | Bednar (22) | 33,743 | 55–51 | L2 |
| 107 | July 29 | Yankees | 6:40 pm | 6–5 (12) | **Hicks** (1–1) | Yarbrough (2–1) | ― | 31,694 | 56–51 | W1 |
| 108 | July 30 | Yankees | 1:10 pm | 2–1 (11) | **Domínguez** (4–3) | Cruz (4–5) | ― | 29,384 | 57–51 | W2 |
| 109 | July 31 | @ Rays | 6:10 pm | 6–1 | **Fedde** (6–6) | Martinez (10–3) | ― | 20,661 | 58–51 | W3 |

August: 14–14 (Home: 7–6; Away: 7–8)

| # | Date | Opponent | Time (CT) | Score | Win | Loss | Save | Attendance | Record | Streak |
|---|---|---|---|---|---|---|---|---|---|---|
| 110 | August 1 | @ Rays | 3:10 pm | 0–1 | Rasmussen (10–5) | **Schultz** (3–8) | Baker (31) | 23,309 | 58–52 | L1 |
| 111 | August 2 | @ Rays | 12:40 pm | 9–1 | **Kay** (8–5) | Jax (6–9) | ― | 23,559 | 59–52 | W1 |
| 112 | August 4 | @ Red Sox | 6:10 pm | 2–14 | Sandoval (1–0) | **Martin** (9–6) | Bello (1) | 37,669 | 59–53 | L1 |
| 113 | August 5 | @ Red Sox | 6:10 pm | 0–4 | Gray (14–2) | **Burke** (7–6) | ― | 37,517 | 59–54 | L2 |
| 114 | August 6 | @ Red Sox | 6:10 pm | 11–12 (13) | Bello (4–6) | **Fedde** (6–7) | ― | 37,082 | 59–55 | L3 |
| 115 | August 7 | Guardians | 6:40 pm | 2–8 | Messick (9–6) | **Schultz** (3–9) | ― | 33,750 | 59–56 | L4 |
| 116 | August 8 | Guardians | 6:15 pm | 6–3 | **Kay** (9–5) | Holderman (6–3) | **Taylor** (6) | 38,227 | 60–56 | W1 |
| 117 | August 9 | Guardians | 1:10 pm | 5–3 | **H. Smith** (1–0) | Yoho (2–1) | **Richards** (1) | 31,263 | 61–56 | W2 |
| 118 | August 11 | Reds | 6:40 pm | 4–5 (10) | Burke (5–4) | **Newcomb** (1–4) | Pagán (14) | 38,113 | 61–57 | L1 |
| 119 | August 12 | Reds | 6:40 pm | 5–0 | **Castillo** (4–9) | Lowder (4–8) | ― | 24,099 | 62–57 | W1 |
| 120 | August 13 | Reds | 1:10 pm | 8–9 | Antone (2–0) | **Fedde** (6–8) | Garcia (2) | 17,013 | 62–58 | L1 |
| 121 | August 14 | @ Tigers | 5:40 pm | 9–5 | **Urquidy** (1–1) | Jobe (1–1) | ― | 39,638 | 63–58 | W1 |
| 122 | August 15 | @ Tigers | 12:10 pm | 4–3 | **Hicks** (2–1) | Sommers (0–3) | **Hudson** (5) | 33,119 | 64–58 | W2 |
| 123 | August 16 | @ Tigers | 12:40 pm | 7–5 | **H. Smith** (2–0) | Holton (1–5) | **Newcomb** (4) | 34,251 | 65–58 | W3 |
| 124 | August 17 | @ Cubs | 7:05 pm | 5–7 (10) | Webb (5–2) | **H. Smith** (2–1) | ― | 40,354 | 65–59 | L1 |
| 125 | August 18 | @ Cubs | 7:05 pm | 3–4 | Webb (6–2) | **Richards** (0–1) | ― | 40,304 | 65–60 | L2 |
| 126 | August 19 | @ Cubs | 1:20 pm | 3–0 | **Urquidy** (2–1) | Holmes (5–6) | **Taylor** (7) | 40,086 | 66–60 | W1 |
| 127 | August 20 | Braves | 1:10 pm | 0–2 | Holmes (8–5) | **Kay** (9–6) | Iglesias (26) | 17,052 | 66–61 | L1 |
| 128 | August 21 | Mets | 6:40 pm | 6–4 | **Taylor** (5–2) | Yan (1–1) | ― | 31,599 | 67–61 | W1 |
| 129 | August 22 | Mets | 6:10 pm | 5–10 | Warren (2–3) | **Castillo** (4–10) | ― | 30,705 | 67–62 | L1 |
| 130 | August 23 | Mets | 1:10 pm | 2–1 | **Taylor** (6–2) | Senga (0–9) | ― | 27,721 | 68–62 | W1 |
| 131 | August 24 | Rangers | 6:40 pm | 2–11 | Rocker (5–10) | **Urquidy** (2–2) | ― | 11,471 | 68–63 | L1 |
| 132 | August 25 | Rangers | 6:40 pm | 11–7 | **Hudson** (4–4) | deGrom (9–9) | **Taylor** (8) | 19,892 | 69–63 | W1 |
| 133 | August 26 | Rangers | 6:40 pm | 10–4 | **Newcomb** (2–3) | Gore (7–10) | **Cannon** (1) | 16,038 | 70–63 | W2 |
| 134 | August 28 | @ Twins | 7:10 pm | 7–4 | **Taylor** (7–2) | Kremer (2–5) | **Hudson** (6) | 28,140 | 71–63 | W3 |
| 135 | August 29 | @ Twins | 1:10 pm | 3–2 | **Fedde** (7–8) | Morris (4–7) | **Hudson** (7) | 28,310 | 72–63 | W4 |
| 136 | August 30 | @ Twins | 1:10 pm | 1–5 | Matthews (9–8) | **Hicks** (2–2) | ― | 26,225 | 72–64 | L1 |
| 137 | August 31 | @ Astros | 7:10 pm | 3–6 | De Los Santos (3–3) | **Kay** (9–7) | Abreu (8) | 21,236 | 72–65 | L2 |

September: 12–13 (Home: 7–6; Away: 5–7)

| # | Date | Opponent | Time (CT) | Score | Win | Loss | Save | Attendance | Record | Streak |
|---|---|---|---|---|---|---|---|---|---|---|
| 138 | September 1 | @ Astros | 7:10 pm | 5–1 | **Burke** (8–6) | Teng (5–7) | ― | 26,838 | 73–65 | W1 |
| 139 | September 2 | @ Astros | 7:10 pm | 0–2 | Blubaugh (5–2) | **Newcomb** (2–4) | Hader (22) | 24,025 | 73–66 | L1 |
| 140 | September 3 | @ Astros | 1:10 pm | 2–6 | Brown (5–3) | **Castillo** (4–11) | ― | 24,155 | 73–67 | L2 |
| 141 | September 4 | Twins | 6:40 pm | 4–1 | **Fedde** (8–8) | Matthews (9–9) | ― | 25,616 | 74–67 | W1 |
| 142 | September 5 | Twins | 6:10 pm | 4–6 | Bradley (11–6) | **Kay** (11–6) | Gómez (21) | 27,749 | 74–68 | L1 |
| 143 | September 6 | Twins | 5:20 pm | 10–1 | **H. Smith** (3–1) | Ober (7–5) | ― | 32,024 | 75–68 | W1 |
| 144 | September 8 | Pirates | 6:40 pm | 3–9 | Chandler (7–9) | **Burke** (8–7) | ― | 18,375 | 75–69 | L1 |
| 145 | September 9 | Pirates | 6:40 pm | 2–4 | Eisert (3–2) | **Martin** (9–7) | Montgomery (11) | 14,803 | 75–70 | L2 |
| 146 | September 10 | Pirates | 6:40 pm | 0–2 | Jones (4–6) | **Fedde** (8–9) | Montgomery (12) | 17,741 | 75–71 | L3 |
| 147 | September 11 | @ Cardinals | 7:15 pm | 3–7 | Graceffo (8–1) | **Kay** (9–9) | ― | 30,274 | 75–72 | L4 |
| 148 | September 12 | @ Cardinals | 6:15 pm | 6–5 | **Hicks** (3–2) | O'Brien (3–8) | **Hudson** (8) | 40,387 | 76–72 | W1 |
| 149 | September 13 | @ Cardinals | 1:15 pm | 1–3 | McGreevy (7–9) | **Sandlin** (2–2) | Soriano (4) | 34,609 | 76–73 | L1 |
| 150 | September 14 | @ Guardians | 5:40 pm | 7–3 | **Burke** (9–7) | Williams (13–8) | – | 24,318 | 77–73 | W1 |
| 151 | September 15 | @ Guardians | 5:40 pm | 6–7 | Smith (6–1) | **Taylor** (7–3) | ― | 23,514 | 77–74 | L1 |
| 152 | September 16 | @ Guardians | 12:10 pm | 3–6 | Messick (12–9) | **H. Smith** (3–2) | Smith (37) | 23,336 | 77–75 | L2 |
| 153 | September 17 | Tigers | 6:40 pm | 3–1 | **Hudson** (5–4) | Valdez (10–11) | **Taylor** (9) | 18,472 | 78–75 | W1 |
| 154 | September 18 | Tigers | 6:40 pm | 8–11 | Sommers (2–4) | **Newcomb** (2–5) | Jansen (21) | 26,204 | 78–76 | L1 |
| 155 | September 19 | Tigers | 6:10 pm | 3–1 | **Burke** (10–7) | Jobe (2–3) | **Taylor** (10) | 30,631 | 79–76 | W1 |
| 156 | September 20 | Tigers | 1:10 pm | 8–1 | **Brazobán** (6–2) | Melton (8–5) | ― | 21,354 | 80–76 | W2 |
| 157 | September 22 | @ Royals | 6:40 pm | 14–11 | **Schultz** (4–9) | Lynch IV (6–6) | ― | 15,785 | 81–76 | W3 |
| 158 | September 23 | @ Royals | 6:40 pm | 4–5 | Thomas (2–1) | **H. Smith** (3–3) | Cruz (8) | 17,114 | 81–77 | L1 |
| 159 | September 24 | @ Royals | 1:10 pm | 9–1 | **Sandlin** (3–2) | Dobnak (3–5) | ― | 15,592 | 82–77 | W1 |
| 160 | September 25 | Rockies | 6:40 pm | 6–1 | **Burke** (11–7) | Sugano (12–12) | ― | 35,778 | 83–77 | W2 |
| 161 | September 26 | Rockies | 6:10 pm | 6–9 | Feltner (7–10) | **Martin** (9–8) | ― | 31,938 | 83–78 | L1 |
| 162 | September 27 | Rockies | 2:10 pm | 4–2 | **Kay** (10–9) | Freeland (4–12) | **Richards** (2) | 29,767 | 84–78 | W1 |

== Postseason ==
=== Game log ===
2026 postseason game log: 4–3 (Home: 0–2; Road: 4–1)
American League Wild Card Series: 2–0 (Home: 0–0; Road: 2–0)

| # | Date | Opponent | Score | Win | Loss | Save | Time (CT) | Record | Attendance | Box |
|---|---|---|---|---|---|---|---|---|---|---|
| 1 | September 29 | @ Astros | 6–3 | Hicks (1–0) | Blubaugh (0–1) | — | 4:00 pm | 1–0 | 34,011 | W1 |
| 2 | September 30 | @ Astros | 7–3 | Kay (1–0) | Brown (0–1) | — | 4:00 pm | 2–0 | 36,015 | W2 |

American League Division Series: 2–3 (Home: 0–2; Road: 2–1)

| # | Date | Opponent | Score | Win | Loss | Save | Time (CT) | Record | Attendance | Box |
|---|---|---|---|---|---|---|---|---|---|---|
| 1 | October 3 | @ Guardians | 3–0 | Hudson (1–0) | Messick (0–1) | Taylor (1) | 12:00 pm | 3–0 | 34,287 | W3 |
| 2 | October 5 | @ Guardians | 4–3 | Burke (1–0) | Sabrowski (0–1) | Taylor (2) | 4:00 pm | 4–0 | 32,050 | W4 |
| 3 | October 7 | Guardians | 3–9 | Griffin (1–0) | Hudson (1–1) | — | 3:00 pm | 4–1 | 40,590 | L1 |
| 4 | October 8 | Guardians | 5–9 | Sabrowski (1–1) | Kay (1–1) | — | 7:00 pm | 4–2 | 39,920 | L2 |
| 5 | October 10 | @ Guardians | 0–2 | Williams (1–0) | Burke (1–1) | Smith (1) | 7:00 pm | 4–3 | 36,889 | L3 |

=== Postseason rosters ===
Playoff rosters
American League Wild Card Series

- Pitchers: 15 Sean Newcomb 18 Anthony Kay 22 Noah Schultz 31 Grant Taylor 32 Hagen Smith 44 Jordan Hicks 47 Erick Fedde 50 Huascar Brazobán 54 David Sandlin 59 Sean Burke 60 Bryan Hudson 65 Davis Martin
- Catchers: 8 Kyle Teel 28 Jake Rogers
- Infielders: 0 Luisangel Acuña 5 Munetaka Murakami 10 Chase Meidroth 12 Colson Montgomery 20 Miguel Vargas
- Outfielders: 7 Brenton Doyle 17 Sam Antonacci 21 Tommy Pham 24 Braden Montgomery 29 Tristan Peters 34 Randal Grichuk
- Designated hitters: 23 Andrew Benintendi

American League Division Series

- Pitchers: 15 Sean Newcomb 18 Anthony Kay 22 Noah Schultz 31 Grant Taylor 32 Hagen Smith 44 Jordan Hicks 47 Erick Fedde 54 David Sandlin 59 Sean Burke 60 Bryan Hudson 63 Tyler Davis 65 Davis Martin
- Catchers: 8 Kyle Teel 28 Jake Rogers
- Infielders: 0 Luisangel Acuña 5 Munetaka Murakami 10 Chase Meidroth 12 Colson Montgomery 20 Miguel Vargas
- Outfielders: 7 Brenton Doyle 17 Sam Antonacci 21 Tommy Pham 24 Braden Montgomery 29 Tristan Peters 34 Randal Grichuk
- Designated hitters: 23 Andrew Benintendi

== Roster ==
2026 Chicago White Sox
Roster
| Pitchers: 46 Osvaldo Bido; 50 Huascar Brazobán; 59 Sean Burke; 48 Jonathan Cannon; 58 Luis Castillo; 63 Tyler Davis; 55 Duncan Davitt; 58 Seranthony Domínguez; 53 Brandon Eisert; 47 Erick Fedde; 40 Tyler Gilbert; 44 Jordan Hicks; 60 Bryan Hudson; 18 Anthony Kay; 49 Jordan Leasure; 65 Davis Martin; 55 Tanner McDougal; 38 Chris Murphy; 15 Sean Newcomb; 51 Doug Nikhazy; 63 Jedixson Páez; 43 Trevor Richards; 46 Joe Rock; 54 David Sandlin; 22 Noah Schultz; 62 Tyler Schweitzer; 39 Lucas Sims; 32 Hagen Smith; 64 Shane Smith; 31 Grant Taylor; 70 José Urquidy | Catchers: 25 Joey Bart; 30 Reese McGuire; 7,26 Edgar Quero; 28 Jake Rogers; 36 Drew Romo; 8 Kyle Teel; Infielders: 0 Luisangel Acuña; 7 Jacob Gonzalez; 10 Chase Meidroth; 12 Colson Montgomery; 5 Munetaka Murakami; 50 Lenyn Sosa; 20 Miguel Vargas | Outfielders: 17 Sam Antonacci; 23 Andrew Benintendi; 7 Brenton Doyle; 34 Randal Grichuk; 37 Dustin Harris; 21 Austin Hays; 25 Derek Hill; 24 Jarred Kelenic; 24 Braden Montgomery; 41 Tanner Murray; 51 Rikuu Nishida; 28 Everson Pereira; 37 Junior Pérez; 29 Tristan Peters; Other batters: 21 Tommy Pham | Manager: 1 Will Venable; Coaches: 84 Zach Bove (pitching); 81 Chris Denorfia (field coordinator); 85 Bobby Hearn (assistant pitching); 71 Justin Jirschele (third base/infield); 73 Jose Leger (first base/outfield); 94 Bennett Markinson (bullpen catcher); 77 Joel McKeithan (assistant hitting); 99 Walker McKinven (bench); 95 Tony Medina (major league assistant); 76 Derek Shomon (hitting); 96 Luis Sierra (bullpen catcher); 83 Matt Wise (bullpen) |

== Statistics ==
=== Batting ===
(Final Stats)
Numbers in bold are team leader.
Note: G = Games played; AB = At bats; R = Runs; H = Hits; 2B = Doubles; 3B = Triples; HR = Home runs; RBI = Runs batted in; SB = Stolen bases; BB = Walks; K = Strikeouts; Avg. = Batting average; OBP = On Base Percentage; SLG = Slugging Percentage; TB = Total Bases

| Player | G | AB | R | H | 2B | 3B | HR | RBI | SB | BB | K | AVG | OBP | SLG | TB |
|---|---|---|---|---|---|---|---|---|---|---|---|---|---|---|---|
| Luisangel Acuña | 103 | 210 | 23 | 48 | 4 | 0 | 2 | 13 | 18 | 9 | 44 | .229 | .261 | .276 | 58 |
| Sam Antonacci | 140 | 480 | 81 | 133 | 25 | **4** | 8 | 48 | 20 | 43 | 82 | **.277** | **.370** | **.396** | 190 |
| Joey Bart | 3 | 6 | 0 | 0 | 0 | 0 | 0 | 0 | 0 | 1 | 4 | .000 | .333 | .000 | 0 |
| Andrew Benintendi | 141 | 421 | 58 | 101 | 24 | 2 | 15 | 78 | 1 | 39 | 112 | .240 | .302 | .413 | 174 |
| Brenton Doyle | 42 | 93 | 13 | 24 | 2 | 1 | 5 | 11 | 5 | 0 | 31 | .258 | .258 | .462 | 43 |
| Jacob Gonzalez | 30 | 86 | 11 | 21 | 4 | 0 | 2 | 17 | 0 | 8 | 22 | .244 | .323 | .360 | 31 |
| Randal Grichuk | 101 | 234 | 33 | 70 | 21 | 2 | 15 | 44 | 0 | 10 | 51 | .299 | .328 | .598 | 140 |
| Dustin Harris | 6 | 12 | 2 | 3 | 1 | 0 | 0 | 1 | 2 | 4 | 1 | .250 | .438 | .333 | 4 |
| Austin Hays | 12 | 43 | 3 | 10 | 1 | 0 | 1 | 7 | 0 | 1 | 13 | .233 | .250 | .326 | 14 |
| Derek Hill | 50 | 80 | 11 | 17 | 1 | 0 | 4 | 8 | 7 | 7 | 29 | .213 | .284 | .375 | 30 |
| Jarred Kelenic | 19 | 53 | 3 | 12 | 2 | 0 | 1 | 4 | 0 | 6 | 20 | .226 | .305 | .321 | 17 |
| Reese McGuire | 11 | 29 | 1 | 5 | 0 | 0 | 0 | 3 | 0 | 2 | 9 | .172 | .273 | .172 | 5 |
| Chase Meidroth | 154 | 566 | 90 | **156** | **31** | 0 | 16 | 63 | 4 | 61 | 141 | .276 | .350 | .415 | 235 |
| Braden Montgomery | 93 | 323 | 47 | 73 | 16 | 3 | 6 | 38 | 1 | 38 | 72 | .226 | .312 | .350 | 113 |
| Colson Montgomery | 153 | 568 | 71 | 112 | 24 | 0 | 31 | 87 | 1 | 54 | **227** | .197 | .282 | .403 | 229 |
| Munetaka Murakami | 127 | 454 | 82 | 94 | 16 | 1 | **35** | 77 | 1 | 92 | 196 | .207 | .347 | .478 | 217 |
| Tanner Murray | 13 | 28 | 2 | 6 | 0 | 0 | 1 | 3 | 0 | 2 | 7 | .214 | .281 | .321 | 9 |
| Rikuu Nishida | 12 | 29 | 3 | 7 | 0 | 0 | 0 | 2 | 0 | 0 | 5 | .241 | .241 | .241 | 7 |
| Everson Pereira | 27 | 80 | 8 | 18 | 5 | 0 | 4 | 11 | 1 | 5 | 30 | .225 | .284 | .438 | 35 |
| Junior Pérez | 22 | 35 | 5 | 6 | 0 | 0 | 3 | 6 | 0 | 1 | 14 | .171 | .194 | .429 | 15 |
| Tristan Peters | 156 | 437 | 63 | 116 | **31** | **4** | 12 | 56 | 8 | 37 | 90 | .265 | .337 | .437 | 191 |
| Tommy Pham | 8 | 17 | 4 | 3 | 0 | 0 | 1 | 3 | 0 | 4 | 4 | .176 | .333 | .353 | 6 |
| Edgar Quero | 69 | 187 | 14 | 38 | 1 | 0 | 3 | 19 | 1 | 18 | 43 | .203 | .284 | .257 | 48 |
| Jake Rogers | 18 | 39 | 2 | 4 | 0 | 0 | 1 | 3 | 0 | 7 | 16 | .103 | .239 | .179 | 7 |
| Drew Romo | 61 | 180 | 17 | 26 | 6 | 0 | 7 | 16 | 1 | 20 | 47 | .144 | .240 | .294 | 53 |
| Lenyn Sosa | 12 | 33 | 2 | 7 | 3 | 0 | 0 | 3 | 0 | 0 | 7 | .212 | .212 | .303 | 10 |
| Kyle Teel | 39 | 119 | 21 | 25 | 3 | 0 | 5 | 26 | 0 | 19 | 51 | .210 | .336 | .361 | 43 |
| Miguel Vargas | **159** | **588** | **106** | 147 | **31** | 1 | 33 | **93** | **22** | **101** | 126 | .250 | .363 | .474 | **279** |
| **TEAM TOTALS** | 162 | 5430 | 776 | 1282 | 252 | 18 | 211 | 740 | 93 | 589 | 1494 | .236 | .320 | .406 | 2203 |

=== Pitching ===
(Final stats)
Numbers in bold are team leader.
Note: W = Wins; L = Losses; ERA = Earned run average; WHIP = Walks plus hits per inning pitched; G = Games pitched; GS = Games started; SV = Saves; IP = Innings pitched; H = Hits allowed; R = Runs allowed; ER = Earned runs allowed; BB = Walks allowed; K = Strikeouts

| Player | W | L | ERA | WHIP | G | GS | SV | IP | H | R | ER | BB | K |
|---|---|---|---|---|---|---|---|---|---|---|---|---|---|
| Luisangel Acuña | 0 | 0 | 3.86 | 1.29 | 3 | 0 | 0 | 2.1 | 2 | 1 | 1 | 1 | 0 |
| Osvaldo Bido | 1 | 0 | 6.23 | 1.50 | 5 | 0 | 0 | 8.2 | 8 | 6 | 6 | 5 | 5 |
| Huascar Brazobán | 1 | 0 | 4.40 | 1.40 | 14 | 0 | 0 | 14.1 | 14 | 7 | 7 | 6 | 7 |
| Sean Burke | **11** | 7 | **3.34** | **1.20** | 32 | 27 | 0 | **172.1** | 144 | 67 | 64 | **62** | **185** |
| Jonathan Cannon | 0 | 0 | 9.00 | 3.00 | 2 | 0 | 1 | 3.0 | 4 | 3 | 3 | 5 | 4 |
| Luis Castillo | 1 | 2 | 8.42 | 1.81 | 9 | 6 | 0 | 31.0 | 44 | 30 | 29 | 12 | 26 |
| Tyler Davis | 2 | 3 | 3.66 | 1.16 | 31 | 0 | 1 | 32.0 | 21 | 15 | 13 | 16 | 27 |
| Duncan Davitt | 0 | 0 | 4.50 | 1.50 | 2 | 0 | 0 | 2.0 | 2 | 1 | 1 | 1 | 1 |
| Seranthony Domínguez | 4 | 3 | 3.99 | 1.33 | 43 | 0 | **12** | 38.1 | 28 | 20 | 17 | 23 | 47 |
| Brandon Eisert | 2 | 1 | 5.93 | 1.24 | 25 | 4 | 0 | 27.1 | 26 | 19 | 18 | 8 | 32 |
| Erick Fedde | 8 | **9** | 3.83 | 1.36 | 33 | 15 | 0 | 141.0 | 139 | 68 | 60 | 52 | 99 |
| Tyler Gilbert | 0 | 0 | 12.00 | 2.67 | 5 | 0 | 0 | 6.0 | 12 | 8 | 8 | 4 | 4 |
| Jordan Hicks | 3 | 2 | 3.94 | 1.54 | 53 | 2 | 1 | 48.0 | 41 | 21 | 21 | 33 | 64 |
| Bryan Hudson | 5 | 4 | 3.74 | 1.28 | **70** | 9 | 8 | 67.1 | 68 | 31 | 28 | 18 | 59 |
| Anthony Kay | 10 | **9** | 4.44 | 1.37 | 33 | **31** | 0 | 158.0 | **161** | **85** | **78** | 56 | 129 |
| Jordan Leasure | 2 | 1 | 6.27 | 1.25 | 18 | 1 | 0 | 18.2 | 15 | 14 | 13 | 8 | 18 |
| Davis Martin | 9 | 8 | 3.95 | 1.32 | 29 | 28 | 0 | 146.0 | 146 | 68 | 64 | 46 | 122 |
| Tanner McDougal | 0 | 0 | 27.00 | 9.00 | 1 | 0 | 0 | 0.1 | 0 | 1 | 1 | 3 | 0 |
| Reese McGuire | 0 | 0 | 0.00 | 0.00 | 1 | 0 | 0 | 1.0 | 0 | 0 | 0 | 0 | 0 |
| Chris Murphy | 3 | 0 | 4.81 | 1.43 | 33 | 3 | 1 | 33.2 | 32 | 21 | 18 | 16 | 35 |
| Sean Newcomb | 2 | 5 | 3.09 | 1.19 | 60 | 6 | 4 | 90.1 | 73 | 35 | 31 | 34 | 84 |
| Doug Nikhazy | 0 | 0 | 4.50 | 1.50 | 1 | 0 | 0 | 2.0 | 1 | 1 | 1 | 2 | 1 |
| Jedixson Páez | 0 | 0 | 18.00 | 2.33 | 3 | 0 | 0 | 3.0 | 4 | 6 | 6 | 3 | 0 |
| Trevor Richards | 0 | 1 | 3.78 | 1.13 | 52 | 0 | 2 | 78.2 | 66 | 37 | 33 | 23 | 68 |
| Joe Rock | 0 | 1 | 3.48 | 2.13 | 4 | 0 | 0 | 10.1 | 11 | 5 | 4 | 11 | 12 |
| David Sandlin | 3 | 2 | 5.58 | 1.22 | 8 | 6 | 0 | 40.1 | 36 | 28 | 25 | 13 | 40 |
| Noah Schultz | 4 | **9** | 5.57 | 1.33 | 19 | 14 | 0 | 74.1 | 68 | 47 | 46 | 31 | 67 |
| Tyler Schweitzer | 1 | 0 | 3.13 | 1.31 | 18 | 0 | 1 | 37.1 | 37 | 13 | 13 | 12 | 18 |
| Lucas Sims | 0 | 2 | 4.50 | 1.60 | 9 | 0 | 0 | 10.0 | 9 | 7 | 5 | 7 | 10 |
| Hagen Smith | 3 | 3 | 1.29 | 0.96 | 18 | 1 | 0 | 28.0 | 11 | 5 | 4 | 16 | 41 |
| Shane Smith | 0 | 2 | 10.80 | 2.52 | 3 | 3 | 0 | 8.1 | 12 | 12 | 10 | 9 | 11 |
| Grant Taylor | 7 | 3 | 2.25 | 1.07 | 60 | 4 | 10 | 84.0 | 60 | 27 | 21 | 30 | 106 |
| José Urquidy | 2 | 1 | 4.37 | 1.19 | 6 | 1 | 0 | 22.2 | 22 | 11 | 11 | 5 | 15 |
| **TEAM TOTALS** | 84 | 78 | 4.12 | 1.31 | 162 | 162 | 41 | 1440.2 | 1317 | 720 | 660 | 571 | 1337 |

== Farm system ==
| Level | Team | League | Manager |
|---|---|---|---|
| AAA | Charlotte Knights | International League | Chad Pinder |
| AA | Birmingham Barons | Southern League | Pat Leyland |
| High-A | Winston-Salem Dash | South Atlantic League | Guillermo Quiróz |
| A | Kannapolis Cannon Ballers | Carolina League | Jayson Nix |
| Rookie | ACL White Sox | Arizona Complex League | Danny Gonzalez |
| Rookie | DSL White Sox | Dominican Summer League | Wellington Morrobel & Anthony Nunez |

== Awards and honors ==
2026 Major League Baseball All-Star Game selections

- Munetaka Murakami
- Miguel Vargas
- Tristan Peters
