= 2027 Chicago White Sox season =

2027 Chicago White Sox
- League: American League
- Division: Central
- Ballpark: Rate Field
- City: Chicago
- Owner: Jerry Reinsdorf
- General manager: Chris Getz
- Manager: Will Venable
- Television: Chicago Sports Network
- Radio: ESPN Chicago; Chicago White Sox Radio Network
- Stats: ESPN.com; Baseball Reference

The 2027 Chicago White Sox season is scheduled to be the club's 128th season in Chicago, their 127th in the American League and their 37th at Rate Field. The White Sox would seek to improve on their 84–78 record from last year, make the postseason for the second consecutive year, and end their five-year AL Central title drought.

The season is contingent on Major League Baseball (MLB) and the Major League Baseball Players Association (MLBPA) signing a new collective bargaining agreement (CBA). Without a new CBA, MLB is expected to lock out the players on December 2, 2026, until one is signed. If such a lockout extends indefinitely, the season could be postponed, shortened, or even cancelled.

== Regular season ==
=== Game log ===
The 2027 schedule is tentative until a new collective bargaining agreement (CBA) is signed between Major League Baseball (MLB) and the Major League Baseball Players Association (MLBPA). If the labor dispute extends into late February or early March, MLB would then start to consider whether to postpone or shorten the season.

Legend
	White Sox win
	White Sox loss
	Postponement
**Bold**	White Sox team member

2027 regular season game log: 0–0 (Home: 0–0; Away: 0–0)
March/April: 0–0 (Home: 0–0; Away: 0–0)

#	Date	Opponent	Time (CT)	Score	Win	Loss	Save	Attendance	Record	Streak
1	March 25	@ Tigers	—	—	—	—	—	—	0–0	—
2	March 27	@ Tigers	—	—	—	—	—	—	0–0	—
3	March 28	@ Tigers	—	—	—	—	—	—	0–0	—
4	March 29	@ Royals	—	—	—	—	—	—	0–0	—
5	March 30	@ Royals	—	—	—	—	—	—	0–0	—
6	March 31	@ Royals	—	—	—	—	—	—	0–0	—
7	April 1	Brewers	—	—	—	—	—	—	0–0	—
8	April 3	Brewers	—	—	—	—	—	—	0–0	—
9	April 4	Brewers	—	—	—	—	—	—	0–0	—
10	April 5	Orioles	—	—	—	—	—	—	0–0	—
11	April 6	Orioles	—	—	—	—	—	—	0–0	—
12	April 7	Orioles	—	—	—	—	—	—	0–0	—
13	April 9	@ Athletics	—	—	—	—	—	—	0–0	—
14	April 10	@ Athletics	—	—	—	—	—	—	0–0	—
15	April 11	@ Athletics	—	—	—	—	—	—	0–0	—
16	April 13	@ Mariners	—	—	—	—	—	—	0–0	—
17	April 14	@ Mariners	—	—	—	—	—	—	0–0	—
18	April 15	@ Mariners	—	—	—	—	—	—	0–0	—
19	April 16	Giants	—	—	—	—	—	—	0–0	—
20	April 17	Giants	—	—	—	—	—	—	0–0	—
21	April 18	Giants	—	—	—	—	—	—	0–0	—
22	April 19	Tigers	—	—	—	—	—	—	0–0	—
23	April 20	Tigers	—	—	—	—	—	—	0–0	—
24	April 21	Tigers	—	—	—	—	—	—	0–0	—
25	April 22	Tigers	—	—	—	—	—	—	0–0	—
26	April 23	@ Angels	—	—	—	—	—	—	0–0	—
27	April 24	@ Angels	—	—	—	—	—	—	0–0	—
28	April 25	@ Angels	—	—	—	—	—	—	0–0	—
29	April 26	@ Dodgers	—	—	—	—	—	—	0–0	—
30	April 27	@ Dodgers	—	—	—	—	—	—	0–0	—
31	April 28	@ Dodgers	—	—	—	—	—	—	0–0	—
32	April 30	Angels	—	—	—	—	—	—	0–0	—

May: 0–0 (Home: 0–0; Away: 0–0)

#	Date	Opponent	Time (CT)	Score	Win	Loss	Save	Attendance	Record	Streak
33	May 1	Angels	—	—	—	—	—	—	0–0	—
34	May 2	Angels	—	—	—	—	—	—	0–0	—
35	May 3	Cardinals	—	—	—	—	—	—	0–0	—
36	May 4	Cardinals	—	—	—	—	—	—	0–0	—
37	May 5	Cardinals	—	—	—	—	—	—	0–0	—
38	May 7	@ Orioles	—	—	—	—	—	—	0–0	—
39	May 8	@ Orioles	—	—	—	—	—	—	0–0	—
40	May 9	@ Orioles	—	—	—	—	—	—	0–0	—
41	May 11	@ Rays	—	—	—	—	—	—	0–0	—
42	May 12	@ Rays	—	—	—	—	—	—	0–0	—
43	May 13	@ Rays	—	—	—	—	—	—	0–0	—
44	May 14	Marlins	—	—	—	—	—	—	0–0	—
45	May 15	Marlins	—	—	—	—	—	—	0–0	—
46	May 16	Marlins	—	—	—	—	—	—	0–0	—
47	May 17	Guardians	—	—	—	—	—	—	0–0	—
48	May 18	Guardians	—	—	—	—	—	—	0–0	—
49	May 19	Guardians	—	—	—	—	—	—	0–0	—
50	May 21	@ Pirates	—	—	—	—	—	—	0–0	—
51	May 22	@ Pirates	—	—	—	—	—	—	0–0	—
52	May 23	@ Pirates	—	—	—	—	—	—	0–0	—
53	May 24	@ Red Sox	—	—	—	—	—	—	0–0	—
54	May 25	@ Red Sox	—	—	—	—	—	—	0–0	—
55	May 26	@ Red Sox	—	—	—	—	—	—	0–0	—
56	May 28	Mariners	—	—	—	—	—	—	0–0	—
57	May 29	Mariners	—	—	—	—	—	—	0–0	—
58	May 30	Mariners	—	—	—	—	—	—	0–0	—
59	May 31	Rays	—	—	—	—	—	—	0–0	—

June: 0–0 (Home: 0–0; Away: 0–0)

#	Date	Opponent	Time (CT)	Score	Win	Loss	Save	Attendance	Record	Streak
60	June 1	Rays	—	—	—	—	—	—	0–0	—
61	June 2	Rays	—	—	—	—	—	—	0–0	—
62	June 4	@ Guardians	—	—	—	—	—	—	0–0	—
63	June 5	@ Guardians	—	—	—	—	—	—	0–0	—
64	June 6	@ Guardians	—	—	—	—	—	—	0–0	—
65	June 7	Phillies	—	—	—	—	—	—	0–0	—
66	June 8	Phillies	—	—	—	—	—	—	0–0	—
67	June 9	Phillies	—	—	—	—	—	—	0–0	—
68	June 10	@ Twins	—	—	—	—	—	—	0–0	—
69	June 11	@ Twins	—	—	—	—	—	—	0–0	—
70	June 12	@ Twins	—	—	—	—	—	—	0–0	—
71	June 13	@ Twins	—	—	—	—	—	—	0–0	—
72	June 14	@ Astros	—	—	—	—	—	—	0–0	—
73	June 15	@ Astros	—	—	—	—	—	—	0–0	—
74	June 16	@ Astros	—	—	—	—	—	—	0–0	—
75	June 18	Twins	—	—	—	—	—	—	0–0	—
76	June 19	Twins	—	—	—	—	—	—	0–0	—
77	June 20	Twins	—	—	—	—	—	—	0–0	—
78	June 21	Rangers	—	—	—	—	—	—	0–0	—
79	June 22	Rangers	—	—	—	—	—	—	0–0	—
80	June 23	Rangers	—	—	—	—	—	—	0–0	—
81	June 24	Royals	—	—	—	—	—	—	0–0	—
82	June 25	Royals	—	—	—	—	—	—	0–0	—
83	June 26	Royals	—	—	—	—	—	—	0–0	—
84	June 27	Royals	—	—	—	—	—	—	0–0	—
85	June 29	@ Reds	—	—	—	—	—	—	0–0	—
86	June 30	@ Reds	—	—	—	—	—	—	0–0	—

July: 0–0 (Home: 0–0; Away: 0–0)

#	Date	Opponent	Time (CT)	Score	Win	Loss	Save	Attendance	Record	Streak
87	July 1	@ Reds	—	—	—	—	—	—	0–0	—
88	July 2	@ Rangers	—	—	—	—	—	—	0–0	—
89	July 3	@ Rangers	—	—	—	—	—	—	0–0	—
90	July 4	@ Rangers	—	—	—	—	—	—	0–0	—
91	July 6	Yankees	—	—	—	—	—	—	0–0	—
92	July 7	Yankees	—	—	—	—	—	—	0–0	—
93	July 8	Yankees	—	—	—	—	—	—	0–0	—
94	July 9	Diamondbacks	—	—	—	—	—	—	0–0	—
95	July 10	Diamondbacks	—	—	—	—	—	—	0–0	—
96	July 11	Diamondbacks	—	—	—	—	—	—	0–0	—
—	July 13	**97th All-Star Game in Chicago, IL**								
97	July 16	@ Cubs	—	—	—	—	—	—	0–0	—
98	July 17	@ Cubs	—	—	—	—	—	—	0–0	—
99	July 18	@ Cubs	—	—	—	—	—	—	0–0	—
100	July 19	@ Blue Jays	—	—	—	—	—	—	0–0	—
101	July 20	@ Blue Jays	—	—	—	—	—	—	0–0	—
102	July 21	@ Blue Jays	—	—	—	—	—	—	0–0	—
103	July 22	@ Blue Jays	—	—	—	—	—	—	0–0	—
104	July 23	Guardians	—	—	—	—	—	—	0–0	—
105	July 24	Guardians	—	—	—	—	—	—	0–0	—
106	July 25	Guardians	—	—	—	—	—	—	0–0	—
107	July 26	Royals	—	—	—	—	—	—	0–0	—
108	July 27	Royals	—	—	—	—	—	—	0–0	—
109	July 28	Royals	—	—	—	—	—	—	0–0	—
110	July 29	@ Guardians	—	—	—	—	—	—	0–0	—
111	July 30	@ Guardians	—	—	—	—	—	—	0–0	—
112	July 31	@ Guardians	—	—	—	—	—	—	0–0	—

August: 0–0 (Home: 0–0; Away: 0–0)

#	Date	Opponent	Time (CT)	Score	Win	Loss	Save	Attendance	Record	Streak
113	August 1	@ Guardians	—	—	—	—	—	—	0–0	—
114	August 3	@ Tigers	—	—	—	—	—	—	0–0	—
115	August 4	@ Tigers	—	—	—	—	—	—	0–0	—
116	August 5	@ Tigers	—	—	—	—	—	—	0–0	—
117	August 6	Cubs	—	—	—	—	—	—	0–0	—
118	August 7	Cubs	—	—	—	—	—	—	0–0	—
119	August 8	Cubs	—	—	—	—	—	—	0–0	—
120	August 9	Red Sox	—	—	—	—	—	—	0–0	—
121	August 10	Red Sox	—	—	—	—	—	—	0–0	—
122	August 11	Red Sox	—	—	—	—	—	—	0–0	—
123	August 13	@ Rockies	—	—	—	—	—	—	0–0	—
124	August 14	@ Rockies	—	—	—	—	—	—	0–0	—
125	August 15	@ Rockies	—	—	—	—	—	—	0–0	—
126	August 16	@ Twins	—	—	—	—	—	—	0–0	—
127	August 17	@ Twins	—	—	—	—	—	—	0–0	—
128	August 18	@ Twins	—	—	—	—	—	—	0–0	—
129	August 19	Athletics	—	—	—	—	—	—	0–0	—
130	August 20	Athletics	—	—	—	—	—	—	0–0	—
131	August 21	Athletics	—	—	—	—	—	—	0–0	—
132	August 22	Athletics	—	—	—	—	—	—	0–0	—
133	August 24	Astros	—	—	—	—	—	—	0–0	—
134	August 25	Astros	—	—	—	—	—	—	0–0	—
135	August 26	Astros	—	—	—	—	—	—	0–0	—
136	August 27	@ Mets	—	—	—	—	—	—	0–0	—
137	August 28	@ Mets	—	—	—	—	—	—	0–0	—
138	August 29	@ Mets	—	—	—	—	—	—	0–0	—
139	August 30	@ Royals	—	—	—	—	—	—	0–0	—
140	August 31	@ Royals	—	—	—	—	—	—	0–0	—

September: 0–0 (Home: 0–0; Away: 0–0)

#	Date	Opponent	Time (CT)	Score	Win	Loss	Save	Attendance	Record	Streak
141	September 1	@ Royals	—	—	—	—	—	—	0–0	—
142	September 3	Blue Jays	—	—	—	—	—	—	0–0	—
143	September 4	Blue Jays	—	—	—	—	—	—	0–0	—
144	September 5	Blue Jays	—	—	—	—	—	—	0–0	—
145	September 6	Twins	—	—	—	—	—	—	0–0	—
146	September 7	Twins	—	—	—	—	—	—	0–0	—
147	September 8	Twins	—	—	—	—	—	—	0–0	—
148	September 10	@ Braves	—	—	—	—	—	—	0–0	—
149	September 11	@ Braves	—	—	—	—	—	—	0–0	—
150	September 12	@ Braves	—	—	—	—	—	—	0–0	—
151	September 14	@ Yankees	—	—	—	—	—	—	0–0	—
152	September 15	@ Yankees	—	—	—	—	—	—	0–0	—
153	September 16	@ Yankees	—	—	—	—	—	—	0–0	—
154	September 17	@ Nationals	—	—	—	—	—	—	0–0	—
155	September 18	@ Nationals	—	—	—	—	—	—	0–0	—
156	September 19	@ Nationals	—	—	—	—	—	—	0–0	—
157	September 20	Tigers	—	—	—	—	—	—	0–0	—
158	September 21	Tigers	—	—	—	—	—	—	0–0	—
159	September 22	Tigers	—	—	—	—	—	—	0–0	—
160	September 24	Padres	—	—	—	—	—	—	0–0	—
161	September 25	Padres	—	—	—	—	—	—	0–0	—
162	September 26	Padres	—	—	—	—	—	—	0–0	—

== Roster ==
Chicago White Sox 2027 spring training roster
40-man roster		Non-roster invitees	Coaches / other
Pitchers: 52 Prelander Berroa; 50 Huascar Brazobán; 59 Sean Burke; 48 Jonathan Cannon; 63 Tyler Davis; 44 Jordan Hicks; 60 Bryan Hudson; 18 Anthony Kay; -- Dustin May; 68 Tanner McDougal; 38 Chris Murphy; 54 David Sandlin; 22 Noah Schultz; 62 Tyler Schweitzer; 32 Hagen Smith; 64 Shane Smith; -- Sean Sullivan; 31 Grant Taylor; 33 Drew Thorpe; 61 Mike Vasil; -- Jaden Woods	Catchers: 26 Edgar Quero; 36 Drew Romo; 8 Kyle Teel; Infielders: 0 Luisangel Acuña; -- William Bergolla Jr.; 10 Chase Meidroth; 12 Colson Montgomery; 5 Munetaka Murakami; -- Graham Pauley; 20 Miguel Vargas; Outfielders: 17 Sam Antonacci; 27 Brooks Baldwin; 7 Brenton Doyle; 24 Braden Montgomery; 41 Tanner Murray; 51 Rikuu Nishida; 29 Tristan Peters; Designated hitters: 23 Andrew Benintendi	Pitchers: -- Alec Marsh	Manager: 1 Will Venable; Coaches: 84 Zach Bove (pitching); 81 Chris Denorfia (field coordinator); 85 Bobby Hearn (assistant pitching); 71 Justin Jirschele (third base/infield); 73 Jose Leger (first base/outfield); 94 Bennett Markinson (bullpen catcher); 77 Joel McKeithan (assistant hitting); 99 Walker McKinven (bench); 95 Tony Medina (major league assistant); 76 Derek Shomon (hitting); 96 Luis Sierra (bullpen catcher); 83 Matt Wise (bullpen); 39 active, 0 inactive, 1 non-roster invitees; 7-, 10-, or 15-day injured list; * Not on active roster; ^{†} Suspended list; Roster, coaches, and NRIs updated November 20, 2026; Transactions • Depth chart; → All MLB rosters

== Farm system ==
Level	Team	League	Manager
AAA	Charlotte Knights	International League	
AA	Birmingham Barons	Southern League	
High-A	Winston-Salem Dash	South Atlantic League	
A	Kannapolis Cannon Ballers	Carolina League	
Rookie	ACL White Sox	Arizona Complex League	
Rookie	DSL White Sox	Dominican Summer League	
