= Jorge Mateo =

Dominican baseball player (born 1995)

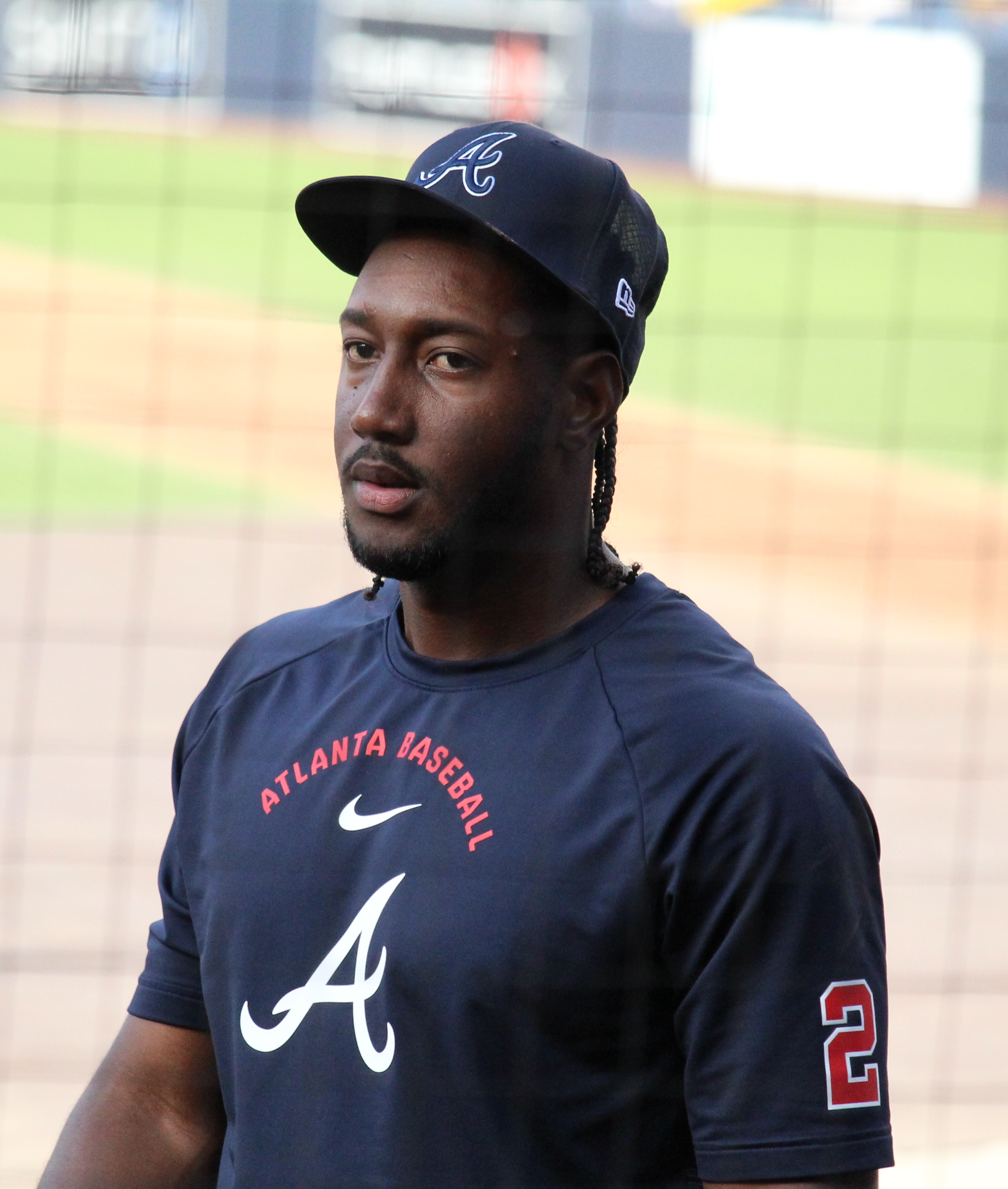
- Mateo with the Atlanta Braves in 2026

Free agent
- Shortstop
- Born: June 23, 1995 (age 31); Santo Domingo, Dominican Republic
- Bats: Right Throws: Right

MLB debut
- August 13, 2020, for the San Diego Padres

MLB statistics (through 2026 season)
- Batting average: .219
- Home runs: 35
- Runs batted in: 139
- Stolen bases: 125
- Stats at Baseball Reference

Teams
- San Diego Padres (2020–2021); Baltimore Orioles (2021–2025); Atlanta Braves (2026); Tampa Bay Rays (2026)

Career highlights and awards
- AL stolen base leader (2022)

Jorge Luis Mateo (born June 23, 1995) is a Dominican professional baseball shortstop who is a free agent. He has played in Major League Baseball (MLB) for the San Diego Padres, Baltimore Orioles, Atlanta Braves, and Tampa Bay Rays. He made his MLB debut in 2020.

== Career ==
=== New York Yankees ===
Mateo signed with the New York Yankees as an international free agent on January 28, 2012, receiving a $250,000 signing bonus. He made his professional debut that season for the Dominican Summer League Yankees 2 and batted .255 with one home run and eight RBI in 14 games. Mateo played for the Dominican Summer League Yankees 1 in 2013, compiling a .287 batting average with seven home runs and 26 RBI in 64 games; he played for the rookie-level Gulf Coast League Yankees in 2014, slashing .276/.354/.397 in 15 games. In 2015, while playing for the Charleston RiverDogs and the Tampa Yankees, Mateo posted a combined .278 batting average with two home runs, 11 triples, 40 RBI, and 82 stolen bases across 117 total appearances between both affiliates. He was named Florida State League Player of the Week for the week of July 17.

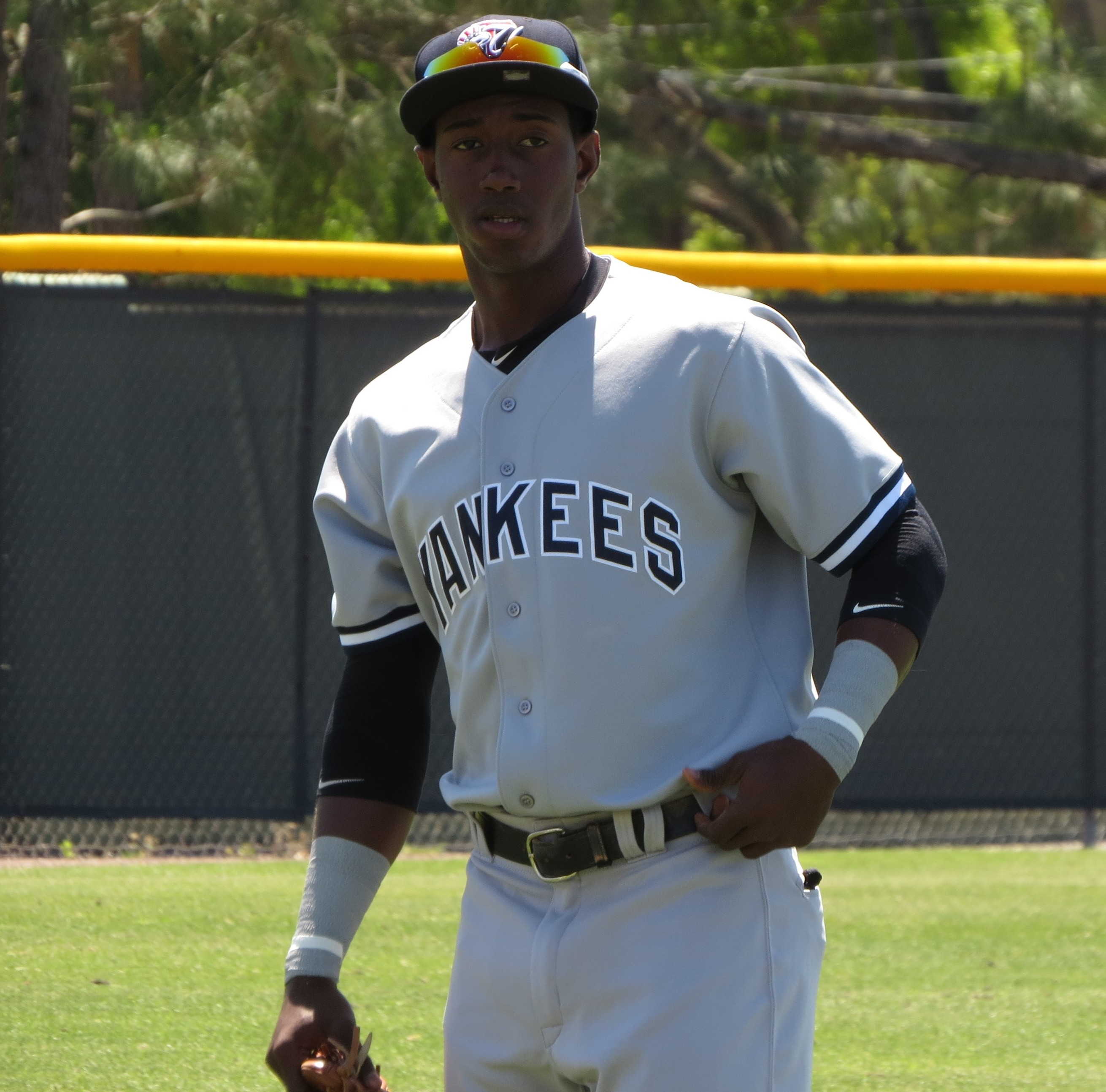
Mateo with the Tampa Yankees in 2016

Mateo was ranked by Baseball America as the top Yankees minor league prospect ahead of Gary Sánchez and Aaron Judge prior to the 2016 campaign. He also received a non-roster invitation to spring training. He spent the season back with Tampa, where he was a Mid-Season All-Star and was named to appear in the All-Star Futures Game. However, on July 6, 2016, Mateo was suspended for two weeks due to violating the team's code of conduct policy, and could not participate in the Futures Game. He reportedly expressed his displeasure to Yankees executives about not being promoted to Double-A Trenton. Mateo finished 2016 with a .254 batting average, eight home runs, 36 stolen bases, and 47 RBI. He spent time at second base following the arrival of Gleyber Torres. The Yankees added Mateo to their 40-man roster after the season. Mateo began 2017 with Tampa and was promoted to the Trenton Thunder in late June. He was a Mid-Season All-Star and Eastern League Player of the Week for the week of July 2.

=== Oakland Athletics ===
On July 31, 2017, the Yankees traded Mateo, along with Dustin Fowler and James Kaprielian to the Oakland Athletics, in exchange for Sonny Gray. Oakland assigned him to the Double-A Midland RockHounds, and he finished the season there. In 129 total games split between Tampa, Trenton, and Midland, he batted .267 in 532 at-bats with 12 home runs, 18 triples, 57 RBI, and 52 stolen bases.

In January 2018, Mateo was named the 64th best prospect in baseball. In April, Baseball America named him as having the best speed of all minor league players, ahead of Phillies outfielder Roman Quinn. That season, playing for the Triple-A Nashville Sounds, he hit .230/.280/.353 in 470 at-bats with three home runs, 16 triples, 45 RBI, and 25 stolen bases while being caught 10 times.

Mateo opened the 2019 season with the Triple-A Las Vegas Aviators. Mateo was named to the 2019 All-Star Futures Game. In 2019 he led the minor league in triples, with 14. Mateo was included in the Athletics' 60-man player pool prior to the start of the 2020 season.

=== San Diego Padres ===
On June 30, 2020, the Athletics traded Mateo to the San Diego Padres in exchange for Junior Pérez. Following the trade, he was considered San Diego's 13th best prospect. He was activated and started his first career game as the left fielder on August 13. On August 27, in the second game of a doubleheaders against the Seattle Mariners, Mateo recorded his first MLB hit on a ground rule double. He hit just .185/.269/.454 in 22 games in the big leagues that year.

Mateo hit his first major league home run on April 29, 2021, against the Arizona Diamondbacks. After hitting .207/.250/.322 through 57 games, he was designated for assignment by the Padres on August 3.

=== Baltimore Orioles ===
On August 5, 2021, Mateo was claimed off of waivers by the Baltimore Orioles. In 2021, he batted .247/.293/.376 with four home runs, 14 RBI, and 10 stolen bases in 89 games between the Padres and Orioles. He was shut down for the season in mid-September after experiencing right lumbar inflammation.

In 2022, Mateo started the year on the Orioles' Opening Day roster at shortstop. He finished the season batting .221/.267/.379 with 13 home runs, 50 RBI, and 35 stolen bases in 494 at-bats. Mateo led the major leagues with the most stolen bases in the regular season of 2022, trailed by teammate Cedric Mullins by one. Mateo won the Fielding Bible Award as the best defensive shortstop in MLB for the 2022 season, making him the first Oriole to win the award at that position.

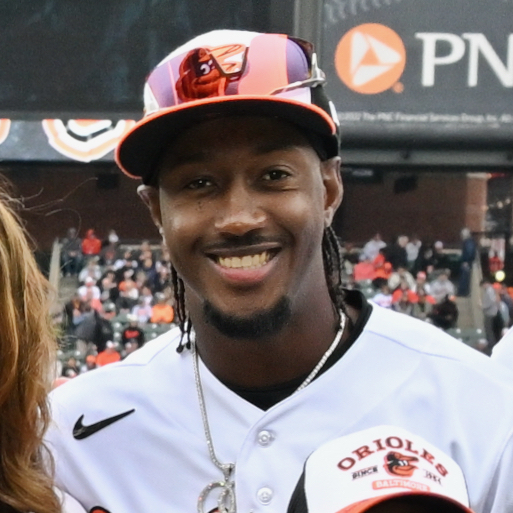
Mateo with the Orioles in 2023

Mateo achieved a 1.062 OPS through April of the 2023 season, but he lost playing time to Gunnar Henderson in 2023 after hitting just .105/.128/.132 through 11 games in May. He concluded the regular season with 32 stolen bases and .217 batting average and .617 OPS, having more success batting against left-handed pitching. Following injuries to both centerfielders Mullins and Aaron Hicks, Mateo made his Orioles centerfield debut on August 5. He joined the team in the postseason 2023 ALDS against the Texas Rangers and went 4-for-4 in Game 2, becoming just the 6th player in MLB history to get four hits while batting ninth. After the season, Mateo agreed to a $2.7 million contract to avoid arbitration.

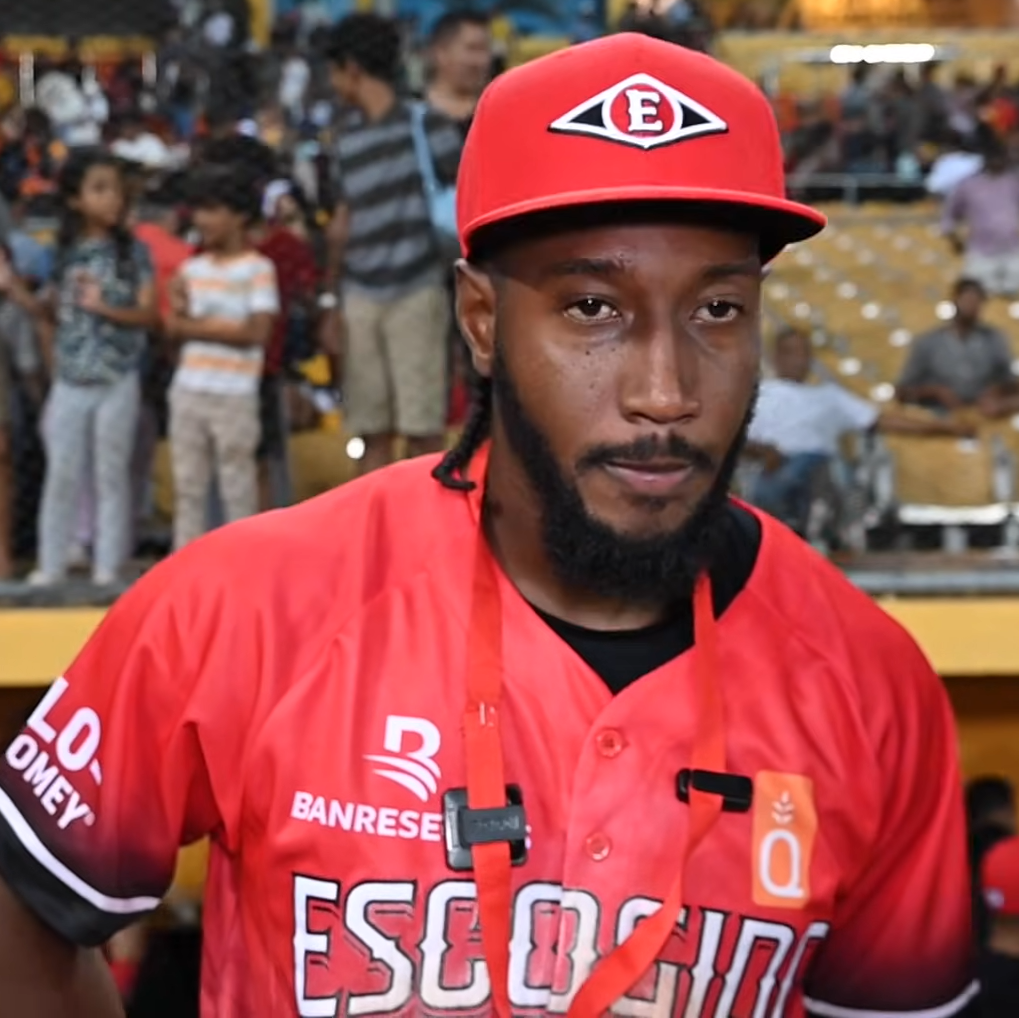
Mateo with the Leones del Escogido in 2026

Mateo began the 2024 campaign with Baltimore, and hit .229/.267/.401 with five home runs, 18 RBI, and 13 stolen bases across 68 games. In a July 23 game against the Miami Marlins, Mateo departed with an injury after colliding with Gunnar Henderson while trying to field a ground ball. After the injury was diagnosed as a left elbow subluxation, Mateo was transferred to the 60–day injured list on July 30. His season officially ended on August 28 when he underwent left elbow ulnar collateral ligament reconstruction.

In the offseason, Mateo agreed to a $3.55 million contract to avoid arbitration that added a club option for the 2026 season. He returned from injury in time to make the Orioles' Opening Day roster in 2025. On April 20, 2025, Mateo made his positional player pitching debut in the 8th inning of a game against the Cincinnati Reds, allowing a grand slam to Noelvi Marte to contribute to the Orioles' 24–2 loss. In 31 games to begin the year, he batted .180/.231/.279 with one home run, three RBI, and 14 stolen bases. On June 10, Mateo was placed on the injured list due to left elbow inflammation. On July 1, while still on the IL, it was announced that Mateo had suffered a hamstring strain and would miss 8-to-10 weeks as a result; he was transferred to the 60-day injured list on July 6. Mateo was activated from the injured list on September 2. He finished the season with a .177/.217/.266 batting line, one home run, three RBI, and 15 stolen bases. On November 3, the Orioles declined Mateo's club option, making him a free agent.

=== Atlanta Braves ===
On January 19, 2026, Mateo signed a one-year, $1 million contract with the Atlanta Braves. In 67 games for the Braves, he slashed .240/.285/.380 with four home runs, 11 RBI, and 10 stolen bases. On August 3, Mateo was designated for assignment by Atlanta. He was released by Atlanta after clearing waivers on August 9.

=== Tampa Bay Rays ===
On August 13, 2026, Mateo signed a major league contract with the Tampa Bay Rays.
