= Junior Pérez =

Dominican baseball player (born 2001)

Baltimore Orioles
- Outfielder
- Born: July 4, 2001 (age 25); San Cristobal, Dominican Republic
- Bats: Right Throws: Right

MLB debut
- June 18, 2026, for the Chicago White Sox

MLB statistics (through 2026 season)
- Batting average: .171
- Home runs: 3
- Runs batted in: 6
- Stats at Baseball Reference

Teams
- Chicago White Sox (2026)

Junior Jose Pérez (born July 4, 2001) is a Dominican professional baseball outfielder in the Baltimore Orioles organization. He has previously played in Major League Baseball (MLB) for the Chicago White Sox.

== Career ==
=== San Diego Padres ===
On July 4, 2017, Pérez signed with the San Diego Padres as an international free agent. He made his professional debut in 2018 with the Dominican Summer League Padres. Pérez made 51 appearances for the rookie-level Arizona League Padres in 2019, hitting .268/.349/.512 with 11 home runs, 39 RBI, and 11 stolen bases. He did not play in a game in 2020 due to the cancellation of the minor league season because of the COVID-19 pandemic.

=== Oakland Athletics ===
On November 5, 2020, Pérez was traded to the Oakland Athletics as the player to be named later from a June 30 trade that sent Jorge Mateo to the Padres.

In 2025, Pérez made 135 appearances for the Double-A Midland RockHounds and Triple-A Las Vegas Aviators, for whom he hit a combined .231/.348/.473 with 26 home runs, 87 RBI, and 27 stolen bases. On November 18, 2025, the Athletics added Pérez to their 40-man roster to protect him from the Rule 5 draft.

Pérez was optioned to Triple-A Las Vegas to begin the 2026 season. He made 36 appearances for the Aviators, batting .210/.273/.384 with five home runs, 19 RBI, and four stolen bases. On May 14, 2026, Pérez was designated for assignment by the Athletics following the acquisition of José Suárez.

=== Chicago White Sox ===
On May 16, 2026, Pérez was traded to the Chicago White Sox in exchange for Jackson Nove. On June 19, Pérez hit his first career home run, a solo shot off of Tarik Skubal of the Detroit Tigers. He made 22 appearances for Chicago, batting .171/.194/.429 with three home runs and six RBI. On November 2, Pérez was removed from the 40–man roster and elected free agency.

=== Baltimore Orioles ===
On November 18, 2026, Pérez signed a minor league contract with the Baltimore Orioles.
