= Davis Martin =

American baseball player (born 1997)

Colorado Rockies
- Pitcher
- Born: January 4, 1997 (age 29); Abilene, Texas, U.S.
- Bats: Left Throws: Right

MLB debut
- May 17, 2022, for the Chicago White Sox

MLB statistics (through 2026 season)
- Win–loss record: 19–29
- Earned run average: 4.19
- Strikeouts: 321
- Stats at Baseball Reference

Teams
- Chicago White Sox (2022, 2024–2026)

Davis Alan Martin (born January 4, 1997) is an American professional baseball pitcher for the Colorado Rockies of Major League Baseball (MLB). He made his MLB debut in 2022 with the Chicago White Sox.

== Amateur career ==
Martin attended Central High School in San Angelo, Texas, where he played baseball and football. As a senior in 2015, he went 9–1 with a 0.29 ERA and 116 strikeouts. After high school, he enrolled at Texas Tech University to play college baseball for the Texas Tech Red Raiders. In 2018, his junior year, he went 7–6 with a 4.87 ERA over 17 starts.

== Professional career ==
=== Chicago White Sox ===
==== Minor leagues ====
The Chicago White Sox selected Martin in the 14th round of the 2018 Major League Baseball draft and he signed. Martin spent his first professional season in 2018 with the rookie–level Arizona League White Sox and the Great Falls Voyagers, posting a 4.29 ERA across nine appearances. In 2019, he spent the season with the Single–A Kannapolis Intimidators, starting 27 games and registering a 9–9 record and 5.04 ERA with 156 strikeouts in 144 2/3 innings pitched.

Martin did not play in a game in 2020 due to the cancellation of the minor league season because of the COVID-19 pandemic. He spent 2021 with the High-A Winston-Salem Dash and Double–A Birmingham Barons. In 23 starts, he recorded a cumulative 4.91 ERA with 98 strikeouts in 88 innings of work. He opened the 2022 season with Birmingham and was promoted to the Triple–A Charlotte Knights during the season.

==== Major leagues ====
On May 17, 2022, the White Sox selected Martin's contract and promoted him to the major leagues for the first time. He made his MLB debut that day as the starting pitcher versus the Kansas City Royals. He pitched five innings in which he gave up one earned run, which was an RBI double in the second inning, while striking out seven, taking the loss as the White Sox fell 2–1. The next day, Martin was sent back to Charlotte. He was recalled and optioned twice in June. He appeared in 14 games (nine starts) for the White Sox in 2022 and had a 3–6 record, a 4.83 ERA, and 48 strikeouts over 63 1/3 innings pitched.

Martin was optioned to Triple-A Charlotte to begin the 2023 season. In three starts for the Knights, he posted 2.81 ERA with 20 strikeouts in 16 innings pitched. On May 17, 2023, Martin underwent Tommy John surgery, ending his season. He did not make an appearance for the White Sox during the season.

Martin was optioned to Triple–A Charlotte to begin the 2024 season as he recovered from the surgery. After successfully rehabbing from the injury, he made his return to the White Sox on July 27, 2024. In 11 appearances for the White Sox in 2024, Martin posted a 4.32 ERA across 50 innings pitched.

Martin was a member of Chicago's starting rotation for the 2025 season. He missed a period of time during the season due to a forearm strain. He started 25 games for the White Sox and went 7–10 with a 4.10 ERA and 104 strikeouts over 142 2/3 innings.

Martin returned as a member of the White Sox starting rotation for the 2026 season. On August 14, he was placed on the injured list with a right middle finger blister. He was activated and returned to the team on September 2. Martin pitched in 29 games (28 starts) for the White Sox and had a 9–8 record, a 3.95 ERA, and 122 strikeouts across 146 innings.

=== Colorado Rockies ===
On November 19, 2026, the White Sox traded Martin and Luis Castillo to the Colorado Rockies for prospects Sean Sullivan and Doug Veliz.
