= Justin Jirschele =

American baseball coach (born 1990)

Chicago White Sox – No. 71
- Coach
- Born: April 15, 1990 (age 36); Clintonville, Wisconsin, U.S.
- Bats: Right Throws: Right
- Stats at Baseball Reference

Teams
- As coach: Chicago White Sox (2024–present)

Justin Douglas Jirschele (born April 15, 1990) is an American professional baseball coach for the Chicago White Sox of Major League Baseball (MLB).

Jirschele is the son of Mike Jirschele. He attended Clintonville High School in Clintonville, Wisconsin. He also played American Legion Baseball for Clintonville, winning the state championship in 2007 and 2008. Jirschele attended the University of Wisconsin-Stevens Point.

Jirschele played in Minor League Baseball in the Chicago White Sox organization for four seasons before retiring in 2015. That year, he became a coach for the Rookie-level Great Falls Voyagers. In 2017, he became manager of the Single-A Kannapolis Intimidators. In 2021, he became the manager of the Double-A Birmingham Barons. The White Sox named him the manager of the Triple-A Charlotte Knights before the 2023 season.

During the 2024 season, Jirschele was promoted as a coach to the major league roster for the White Sox. He returned to their staff in 2025.
