= Grant Taylor (baseball) =

American baseball player (born 2002)

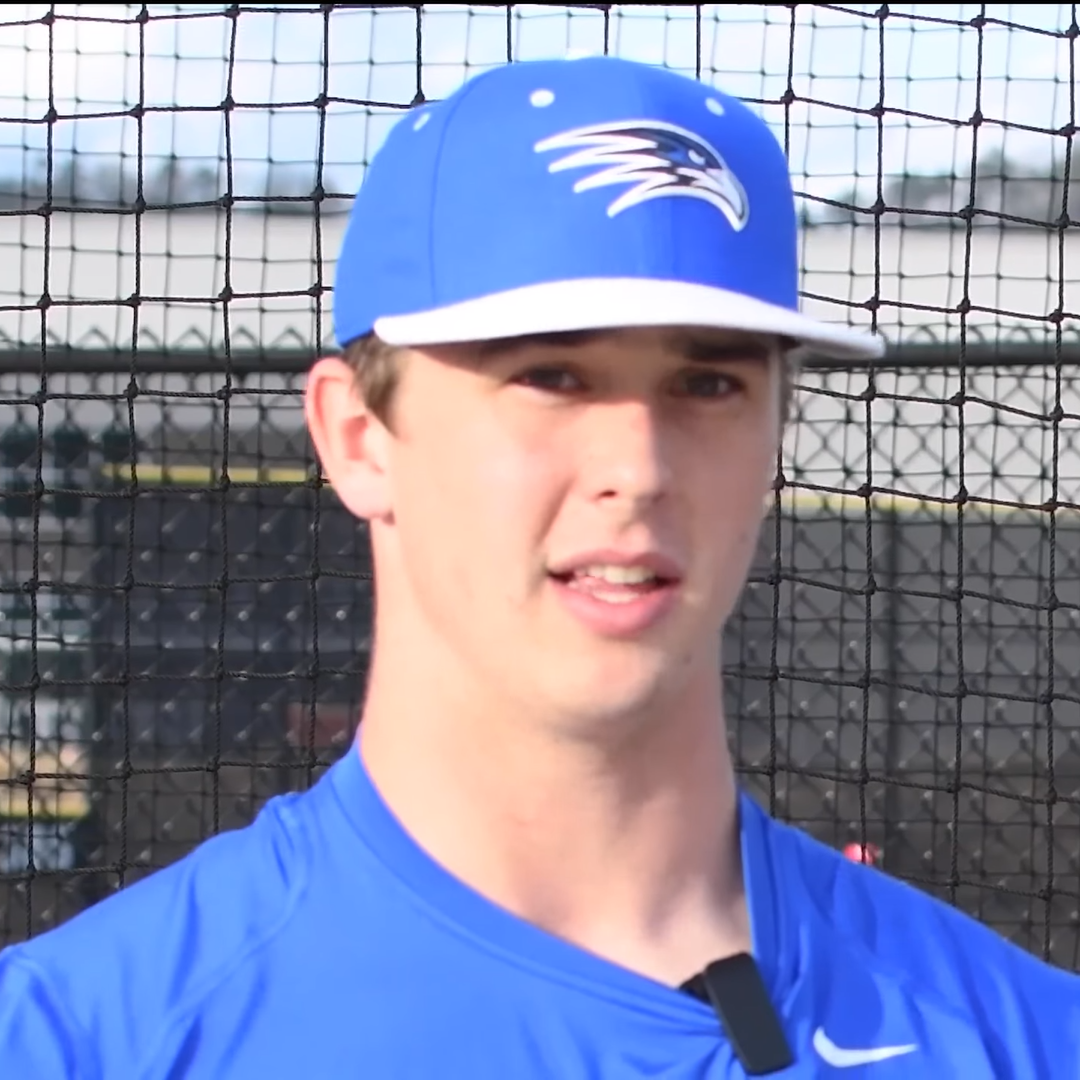
- Taylor with the Florence Falcons in 2021

Chicago White Sox – No. 31
- Pitcher
- Born: May 20, 2002 (age 24); Florence, Alabama, U.S.
- Bats: Right Throws: Right

MLB debut
- June 10, 2025, for the Chicago White Sox

MLB statistics (through 2026 season)
- Win–loss record: 9–7
- Earned run average: 3.06
- Strikeouts: 160
- Stats at Baseball Reference

Teams
- Chicago White Sox (2025–present)

Grant Alan Taylor (born May 20, 2002) is an American professional baseball pitcher for the Chicago White Sox of Major League Baseball (MLB). He made his MLB debut in 2025.

== Amateur career ==
Taylor attended Florence High School in Florence, Alabama, and Louisiana State University (LSU), where he played college baseball for the LSU Tigers. In Taylor's freshman season, he made 17 appearances, starting in two of them, in which he threw 31 innings, earning a record of 4–1, while having a 5.81 earned run average (ERA) and striking out 39 batters. In 2022, he played collegiate summer baseball with the Brewster Whitecaps of the Cape Cod Baseball League. Taylor was thought to be a part of the Tigers' starting lineup going into the 2023 season. However, Taylor injured his elbow and required Tommy John surgery.

== Professional career ==
In spite of his injury, Taylor was selected by the Chicago White Sox in the second round, with the 51st overall selection, of the 2023 Major League Baseball draft. On July 16, 2023, Taylor signed with the White Sox. Taylor made his professional debut early in the 2024 season with the rookie-level Arizona Complex League White Sox before being promoted to the Single-A Kannapolis Cannon Ballers. On or about July 23, however, he was placed on the 60-day injured list with a lat injury. He had managed 25 strikeouts against just one walk in 16 innings that season.

Taylor began the 2025 season with the Double-A Birmingham Barons, recording a 1.01 ERA with 37 strikeouts across 15 appearances (six starts). On June 10, 2025, Taylor was selected to the 40-man roster and promoted to the major leagues for the first time. On September 3, Taylor recorded his first career win, tossing 1 1/3 scoreless innings against the Minnesota Twins.
