= Chris Murphy (baseball) =

American baseball player (born 1998)

Chicago White Sox – No. 38
- Pitcher
- Born: June 5, 1998 (age 28); Mission Hills, California, U.S.
- Bats: Left Throws: Left

MLB debut
- June 7, 2023, for the Boston Red Sox

MLB statistics (through 2026 season)
- Win–loss record: 7–2
- Earned run average: 4.34
- Strikeouts: 114
- Stats at Baseball Reference

Teams
- Boston Red Sox (2023, 2025); Chicago White Sox (2026–present)

Christopher Michael Murphy (born June 5, 1998) is an American professional baseball pitcher for the Chicago White Sox of Major League Baseball (MLB). He has previously played in MLB for the Boston Red Sox.

== Early life and amateur career ==
Murphy grew up in Granada Hills, California, and attended Granada Hills Charter High School. He was named the CIF Los Angeles City Section's Most Valuable Pitcher as a senior.

Murphy played college baseball for the San Diego Toreros for three seasons. He was named a Freshman All-American by Collegiate Baseball after posting a 3–4 win–loss record with a 4.17 earned run average (ERA) and a team-high 89 strikeouts. In 2018, he played collegiate summer baseball with the Brewster Whitecaps of the Cape Cod Baseball League. As a junior, Murphy went 4–3 with a 3.50 ERA and 87 strikeouts with 43 walks over 64 1/3 innings pitched.

== Professional career ==
=== Boston Red Sox ===
Murphy was selected in the sixth round of the 2019 MLB draft by the Boston Red Sox. After signing with the team, he was assigned to the Low-A Lowell Spinners and posted a 1.08 ERA with 34 strikeouts in 33 1/3 innings pitched. He did not play in a game in 2020 due to the cancellation of the minor league season because of the COVID-19 pandemic. Murphy began the 2021 season with the High-A Greenville Drive before being promoted to the Double-A Portland Sea Dogs. Overall with both teams during 2021, Murphy made 21 appearances (20 starts), compiling a 4.62 ERA and 8–5 record while striking out 128 batters in 101 1/3 innings.

Murphy began the 2022 season with Portland. He made his Triple-A debut with the Worcester Red Sox on June 30. Overall with both teams, Murphy pitched to a 7–11 record in 30 games (28 starts), posting a 4.03 ERA while striking out 149 batters in 152 innings.

On November 15, 2022, the Red Sox added Murphy to the 40-man roster to protect him from the Rule 5 draft. Murphy was optioned to Triple-A Worcester to begin the 2023 season. In 10 games (9 starts) for Worcester through early June, Murphy registered a 7.71 ERA with 42 strikeouts in 39 2/3 innings pitched. He was added to Boston's active major-league roster on June 6. He made his MLB debut the following day, pitching 3 1/3 innings of scoreless relief again the Cleveland Guardians. He was optioned back to Worcester on June 8, was briefly on Boston's roster for a doubleheader on June 18, and was recalled on June 23. Murphy impressed in his first long stint with Boston, serving primarily as a bulk reliever. On August 11, Murphy earned his first major-league save, pitching three shutout innings against the Detroit Tigers. He split time between Boston and Worcester during the second-half of August and during September.

Murphy was placed on the 60–day injured list to begin the 2024 season after suffering a left UCL sprain in his left elbow. He underwent Tommy John surgery on April 10, 2024, ending his season. On June 28, 2025, Murphy was activated from the injured list and added to Boston's active roster. He pitched two scoreless innings that day during a Red Sox win, his first major-league appearance since September 2023.

=== Chicago White Sox ===
On November 18, 2025, the Red Sox traded Murphy to the Chicago White Sox in exchange for catcher Ronny Hernandez.
