= Tyler Schweitzer =

American baseball player (born 2000)

Chicago White Sox – No. 62
- Pitcher
- Born: September 19, 2000 (age 26); Indianapolis, Indiana, U.S.
- Bats: Left Throws: Left

MLB debut
- April 8, 2026, for the Chicago White Sox

MLB statistics (through 2026 season)
- Win–loss record: 1–0
- Earned run average: 3.13
- Strikeouts: 18
- Stats at Baseball Reference

Teams
- Chicago White Sox (2026–present)

Tyler Joseph Schweitzer (born September 19, 2000) is an American professional baseball pitcher for the Chicago White Sox of Major League Baseball (MLB). He made his MLB debut in 2026.

== Amateur career ==
Schweitzer attended Hamilton Southeastern High School in Fishers, Indiana and played college baseball at Ball State University, where he studied finance. As a junior in 2022, he was the Mid-American Conference Baseball Pitcher of the Year.

== Professional career ==
The Chicago White Sox selected Schweitzer in the Chicago White Sox in the fifth round of the 2022 Major League Baseball draft. He signed with the White Sox and spent his first professional season with the Kannapolis Cannon Ballers and Winston-Salem Dash. He pitched 2024 with Winston-Salem before being promoted to the Birmingham Barons. Schweitzer started 2025 with Birmingham and was promoted to the Charlotte Knights early in the season.

Schweitzer was assigned to Triple-A Charlotte to begin the 2026 season. On April 8, Schweitzer was selected to the 40-man roster and promoted to the major leagues for the first time. He pitched once before being sent back down to the minors. Chicago recalled him on May 8.

== Personal life ==
Schweitzer's parents are Joe Schweitzer and Susan Binford. He has an older sister.
