= Tyler Davis (baseball) =

American baseball player (born 1998)

Chicago White Sox – No. 63
- Pitcher
- Born: October 3, 1998 (age 28); Webster, Texas, U.S.
- Bats: Right Throws: Right

MLB debut
- April 25, 2026, for the Chicago White Sox

MLB statistics (through 2026 season)
- Win–loss record: 2–3
- Earned run average: 3.66
- Strikeouts: 27
- Stats at Baseball Reference

Teams
- Chicago White Sox (2026–present)

Tyler David Davis (born October 3, 1998) is an American professional baseball pitcher for the Chicago White Sox of Major League Baseball (MLB). He made his MLB debut in 2026.

== Career ==
Davis played college baseball for Wichita State and Sam Houston State. He was signed by the Chicago White Sox as an undrafted free agent in 2024 after pitching in five games for the Oakland Ballers of the Pioneer Baseball League.

On April 23, 2026, Davis was selected to the 40–man roster and promoted to the major leagues for the first time. On May 13, he recorded his first career win, tossing 1 2/3 scoreless innings of relief against the Kansas City Royals. On May 31, Davis earned his first career save, recording the final two outs of a 2–1 victory over the Detroit Tigers.
