= Sean Burke (baseball) =

American baseball player (born 1999)

Chicago White Sox – No. 59
- Pitcher
- Born: December 18, 1999 (age 26); Sutton, Massachusetts, U.S.
- Bats: Right Throws: Right

MLB debut
- September 10, 2024, for the Chicago White Sox

MLB statistics (through 2026 season)
- Win–loss record: 17–18
- Earned run average: 3.59
- Strikeouts: 340
- Stats at Baseball Reference

Teams
- Chicago White Sox (2024–present)

Sean Michael Burke (born December 18, 1999) is an American professional baseball pitcher for the Chicago White Sox of Major League Baseball (MLB). He made his MLB debut in 2024.

== Career ==
Burke attended Saint John's High School in Shrewsbury, Massachusetts. and played college baseball at the University of Maryland. The Chicago White Sox selected Burke in the third round of the 2021 Major League Baseball draft. Burke spent his first professional season with the rookie–level Arizona Complex League White Sox and Single–A Kannapolis Cannon Ballers.

Burke split the 2022 campaign between the High–A Winston-Salem Dash, Double–A Birmingham Barons, and Triple–A Charlotte Knights. In 27 games (26 starts) for the three affiliates, he compiled a 4–10 record and 4.75 ERA with 137 strikeouts across 108 innings pitched. Burke spent the entirety of 2023 with Charlotte, logging a 1–4 record and 7.61 ERA with 34 strikeouts over 9 starts.

Burke made 16 starts for the Triple–A Charlotte Knights to begin 2024, compiling a 2–6 record and 4.62 ERA with 86 strikeouts across 64 1/3 innings pitched. On September 10, 2024, Burke was selected to the 40-man roster and promoted to the major leagues for the first time. In 4 appearances (3 starts) for the White Sox during his rookie campaign, Burke compiled a 2-0 record and 1.42 ERA with 22 strikeouts across 19 innings of work.

Burke was named Chicago's Opening Day starter prior to the 2025 season. He went 4–11 with a 4.22 ERA and 133 strikeouts in 134 1/3 innings.

In 2026, Burke posted an 11–7 record, a 3.34 ERA, and 185 strikeouts in 172 1/3 innings, helping lead the White Sox to the postseason.
