= David Sandlin (baseball) =

American baseball player (born 2001)

Chicago White Sox – No. 54
- Pitcher
- Born: February 21, 2001 (age 25); Owasso, Oklahoma, U.S.
- Bats: Right Throws: Right

MLB debut
- May 27, 2026, for the Chicago White Sox

MLB statistics (through 2026 season)
- Win–loss record: 3–2
- Earned run average: 5.58
- Strikeouts: 40
- Stats at Baseball Reference

Teams
- Chicago White Sox (2026–present)

David Eleck Sandlin (born February 21, 2001) is an American professional baseball pitcher for the Chicago White Sox of Major League Baseball (MLB). He made his MLB debut in 2026.

== Career ==
=== Amateur ===
Sandlin attended Owasso High School in Owasso, Oklahoma, and played college baseball at Eastern Oklahoma State College and for the Oklahoma Sooners. In one season at Oklahoma, he pitched in 19 games (18 starts) while posting a 5.59 earned run average (ERA) and striking out 102 batters in 95 innings.

=== Kansas City Royals ===
Sandlin was drafted by the Kansas City Royals in the 11th round (325th overall) of the 2022 Major League Baseball draft.

Sandlin signed with the Royals and made his professional debut in 2022 with the Arizona Complex League Royals, pitching in one game for two innings. In 2023, he played for the Single-A Columbia Fireflies and the High-A Quad Cities River Bandits, posting a combined 3.51 ERA in 14 games (all starts) while striking out 87 batters in 66 2/3 innings.

=== Boston Red Sox ===
On February 17, 2024, the Royals traded Sandlin to the Boston Red Sox in exchange for John Schreiber. Sandlin began the 2024 season with the Red Sox' High-A affiliate, the Greenville Drive, with whom he was 0–2 with a 5.12 ERA in 31 2/3 innings. In 2024, he also pitched for the Double-A Portland Sea Dogs, with whom he was 0–2 with a 5.61 ERA in 25 2/4 innings.

In 2025, Sandlin made 32 appearances (14 starts) for Portland and the Triple-A Worcester Red Sox, accumulating a 9-6 record and 4.50 ERA with 107 strikeouts over 106 innings of work. On November 18, 2025, the Red Sox added Sandlin to their 40-man roster to protect him from the Rule 5 draft.

=== Chicago White Sox ===
On February 1, 2026, the Red Sox traded Sandlin and Jordan Hicks to the Chicago White Sox in exchange for Gage Ziehl. He was optioned to the Triple-A Charlotte Knights to begin the regular season. In four starts for Charlotte, Sandlin recorded an 0.75 ERA with 17 strikeouts across 12 innings pitched. On May 26, Sandlin was promoted to the major leagues for the first time. Sandlin made his MLB debut the following day and retired 18 straight batters after the first inning against the Minnesota Twins en route to his first MLB win.
