= Sam Antonacci =

American baseball player (born 2003)

- Antonacci with the Chicago White Sox in 2026

Chicago White Sox – No. 17
- Left fielder / Second baseman
- Born: February 6, 2003 (age 23); Springfield, Illinois, U.S.
- Bats: Left Throws: Right

MLB debut
- April 15, 2026, for the Chicago White Sox

MLB statistics (through 2026 season)
- Batting average: .277
- Home runs: 8
- Runs batted in: 48
- Stats at Baseball Reference

Teams
- Chicago White Sox (2026–present)

Samuel Joseph Antonacci (born February 6, 2003) is an American professional baseball left fielder and second baseman for the Chicago White Sox of Major League Baseball (MLB). He made his MLB debut in 2026.

== Early life and amateur career ==
Antonacci grew up in Springfield, Illinois where he was a fan of the St. Louis Cardinals.

Antonacci attended Sacred Heart-Griffin High School in Springfield where he batted .533 as a senior in 2021 and had a career .477 batting average. After graduating, he played two seasons of college baseball at Heartland Community College. As a sophomore in 2023, he hit .515 with 14 home runs, 103 RBI, and 32 doubles and was named the NJCAA Division II Baseball Player of the Year. After the 2023 season, he played collegiate summer baseball with the Chatham Anglers of the Cape Cod Baseball League, and transferred to Coastal Carolina University. For the 2024 season with Coastal Carolina, he hit .367 with six home runs and 47 RBI.

== Professional career ==
=== Minor leagues ===
Antonacci was selected by the Chicago White Sox in the fifth round (140th overall) of the 2024 Major League Baseball draft. He signed with the team for $572,500. Antonacci made his professional debut after signing with the Kannapolis Cannon Ballers, hitting .333 with 14 RBI over 23 games.

Antonacci opened the 2025 season with the Winston-Salem Dash. He was named the White Sox Minor League Player of the Month in June. In July, he was promoted to the Birmingham Barons. Over 116 games played, Antonacci hit .291 with five home runs, 57 RBI, and 48 stolen bases. After the season, he played in the Arizona Fall League with the Glendale Desert Dogs. Across 19 games, he hit .378 with three home runs and was named an All-Star alongside leading the league with 28 hits and 24 runs. Antonacci was assigned to the Charlotte Knights to open the 2026 season and batted .313 with two home runs across 14 games.

=== Major leagues ===
On April 15, 2026, Antonacci was selected to the 40-man roster and promoted to the major leagues for the first time. He made his MLB debut that night at Rate Field as the White Sox' starting second baseman versus the Tampa Bay Rays and recorded his first MLB hit, a single off Cole Sulser, in his first major league at-bat. Antonacci's first MLB home run was an inside-the-park home run at Chase Field on April 22 off of Arizona Diamondbacks reliever Ryan Thompson. He played in a total of 140 games during his 2026 rookie season and had a .277/.370/.396 slash line with eight home runs, 48 RBI, and 25 stolen bases. Antonacci made his postseason debut as Chicago's starting left fielder in Game 1 of the 2026 American League Wild Card Series and finished the series 2-for-7 as the White Sox swept the Houston Astros.

== International career ==
Antonacci played for Team Italy in the 2026 World Baseball Classic.
