= Bryan Hudson (baseball) =

American baseball player (born 1997)

Chicago White Sox – No. 60
- Pitcher
- Born: May 8, 1997 (age 29); Godfrey, Illinois, U.S.
- Bats: Left Throws: Left

MLB debut
- June 17, 2023, for the Los Angeles Dodgers

MLB statistics (through 2026 season)
- Win–loss record: 11–6
- Earned run average: 3.23
- Strikeouts: 147
- Stats at Baseball Reference

Teams
- Los Angeles Dodgers (2023); Milwaukee Brewers (2024–2025); Chicago White Sox (2025–present)

Bryan Michael Hudson (born May 8, 1997) is an American professional baseball pitcher for the Chicago White Sox of Major League Baseball (MLB). He has previously played in MLB for the Los Angeles Dodgers and Milwaukee Brewers.

== Career ==
=== Chicago Cubs ===
Hudson attended Alton High School in Alton, Illinois. He was drafted by the Chicago Cubs in the third round, with the 82nd overall selection, of the 2015 Major League Baseball draft. He made his professional debut with the rookie–level Arizona League Cubs, and pitched to a 2.70 ERA in 5 games.

Hudson pitched the 2016 season with the Low–A Eugene Emeralds, posting a 5–4 record and 5.06 ERA with 41 strikeouts across 13 starts. In 2017, he made 24 starts for the Single–A South Bend Cubs, registering a 9–3 record and 3.91 ERA with 81 strikeouts across 124 1/3 innings pitched. Hudson spent the 2018 season with the High–A Myrtle Beach Pelicans, working to a 6–7 record and 4.70 ERA with 78 strikeouts across 23 starts.

Hudson split the 2019 season between Myrtle Beach and the AZL Cubs, accumulating a 4.66 ERA with 32 strikeouts across 36 2/3 innings of work. He did not play in a game in 2020 due to the cancellation of the minor league season because of the COVID-19 pandemic. Hudson returned to action in 2021 to pitch for the Double–A Tennessee Smokies and Triple–A Iowa Cubs, combining for a 6–4 record and 5.76 ERA with 55 strikeouts in 58 2/3 innings pitched. He again played for Tennessee and Iowa in 2022, making 39 appearances out of the bullpen, recording a 3.66 ERA with 76 strikeouts and 4 saves in 59 innings of work. Hudson elected free agency following the season on November 10, 2022.

=== Los Angeles Dodgers ===
On December 23, 2022, Hudson signed a minor league contract with the Los Angeles Dodgers. He began the season with the Triple-A Oklahoma City Dodgers before being called up to the majors for the first time on June 17. He pitched two innings in his debut, allowing three runs on four hits and a walk. His first MLB strikeout was of Blake Sabol of the San Francisco Giants. He pitched in six games for Los Angeles, allowing seven runs in 8 2/3 innings while pitching 46 games for Oklahoma City to a 5–2 record and 2.43 ERA. On December 27, Hudson was designated for assignment following the signing of Yoshinobu Yamamoto.

=== Milwaukee Brewers ===
On January 3, 2024, the Dodgers traded Hudson to the Milwaukee Brewers in exchange for minor leaguer Justin Chambers and a player to be named later. Hudson immediately became a major factor in the Brewers' bullpen, being frequently used in two-inning stints to maintain leads. By early July, Hudson had a 0.82 ERA after throwing the fifth-most innings of any reliever in Major League Baseball. This pace would have had Hudson pitching more innings than he had since converting from a starting role in 2019. As a result, the Brewers announced that they would be more closely monitoring his usage to avoid overtaxing Hudson's body. By September 3, Hudson had a 1.73 ERA and a 0.72 WHIP over 43 relief appearances, but was optioned to Triple-A and spent the remainder of the season with the Nashville Sounds due to a decrease in his fastball's velocity.

Hudson made 12 appearances for the Brewers during the 2025 season, posting an 0-1 record and 4.35 ERA with 13 strikeouts across 10 1/3 innings pitched. He was designated for assignment by Milwaukee on July 31, 2025.

=== Chicago White Sox ===
On August 3, 2025, Hudson was claimed off waivers by the Chicago White Sox. He made four appearances for the White Sox, recording a 5.79 ERA with six strikeouts across 4 2/3 innings pitched.

Hudson was designated for assignment by Chicago following the signing of Austin Hays on February 4, 2026.

On February 10, 2026, Hudson was traded to the New York Mets in exchange for cash considerations. On March 25, Hudson was designated to assignment by the Mets. On March 27, Hudson was claimed back off waivers by the White Sox.
