= Anthony Kay =

American baseball player (born 1995)

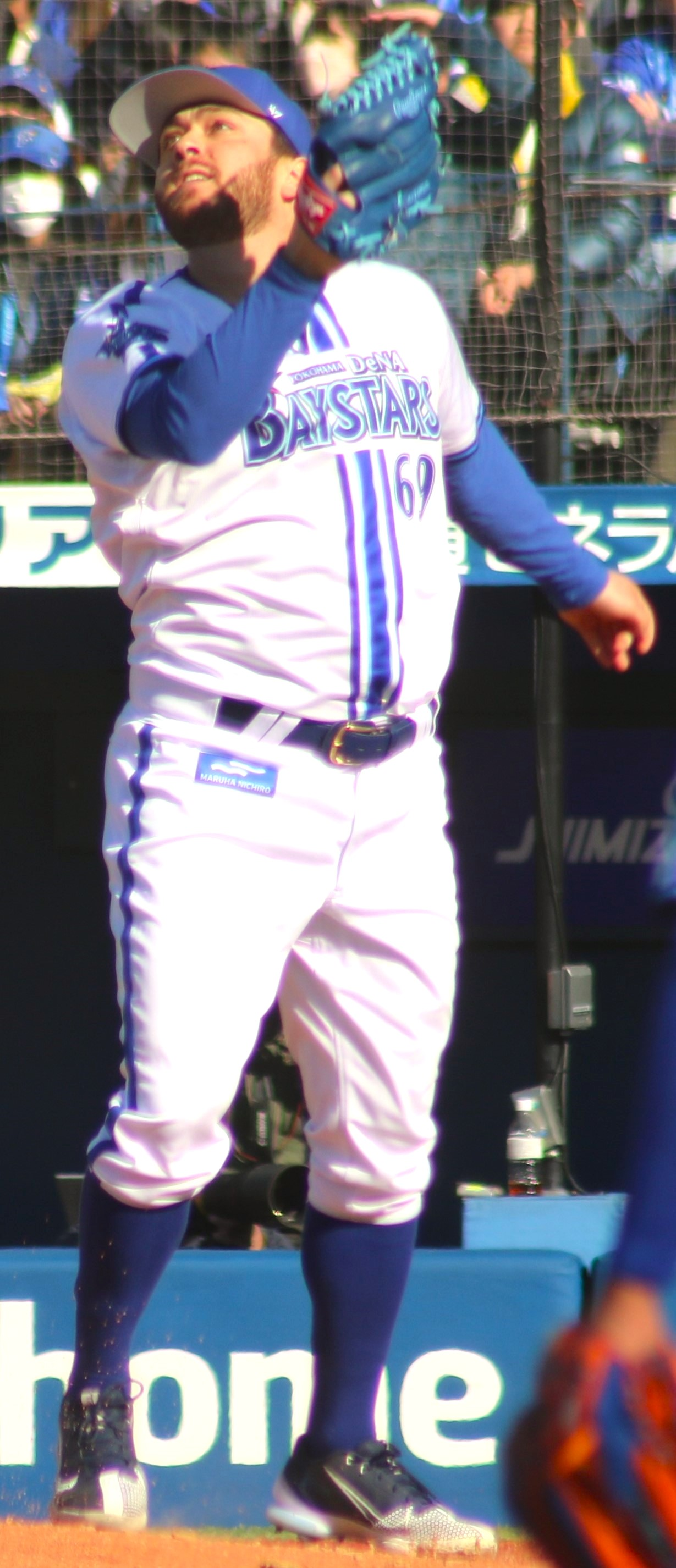
- Kay with the Yokohama DeNA BayStars

Chicago White Sox – No. 18
- Pitcher
- Born: March 21, 1995 (age 31); Stony Brook, New York, U.S.
- Bats: Left Throws: Left

Professional debut
- MLB: September 7, 2019, for the Toronto Blue Jays
- NPB: April 6, 2024, for the Yokohama DeNA BayStars

MLB statistics (through 2026 season)
- Win–loss record: 14–11
- Earned run average: 4.85
- Strikeouts: 217

NPB statistics (through 2025 season)
- Win–loss record: 15–15
- Earned run average: 2.54
- Strikeouts: 249
- Stats at Baseball Reference

Teams
- Toronto Blue Jays (2019–2022); Chicago Cubs (2023); New York Mets (2023); Yokohama DeNA BayStars (2024–2025); Chicago White Sox (2026–present)

Career highlights and awards
- Japan Series champion (2024)

Anthony Benjamin Kay (born March 21, 1995) is an American professional baseball pitcher for the Chicago White Sox of Major League Baseball (MLB). He has previously played in MLB for the Toronto Blue Jays, Chicago Cubs, and New York Mets, and in Nippon Professional Baseball (NPB) for the Yokohama DeNA BayStars. Kay was drafted by the Mets in the first round, with the 31st overall selection, of the 2016 MLB draft.

== Career ==
=== Amateur ===
Kay attended Ward Melville High School in East Setauket, New York. He was drafted by the New York Mets in the 29th round of the 2013 Major League Baseball draft, but did not sign. He attended the University of Connecticut to play college baseball.

As a freshman at Connecticut in 2014, Kay appeared in 18 games and made eight starts. He went 5–4 with a 3.49 earned run average (ERA) and 56 strikeouts. As a sophomore, he started 14 out of 17 games and was 8–6 with a 2.07 ERA with 96 strikeouts. As a junior, he started 17 games, going 9–2 with a 2.65 ERA and 111 strikeouts. In 2014 and 2015, he played collegiate summer baseball with the Wareham Gatemen of the Cape Cod Baseball League.

=== New York Mets ===
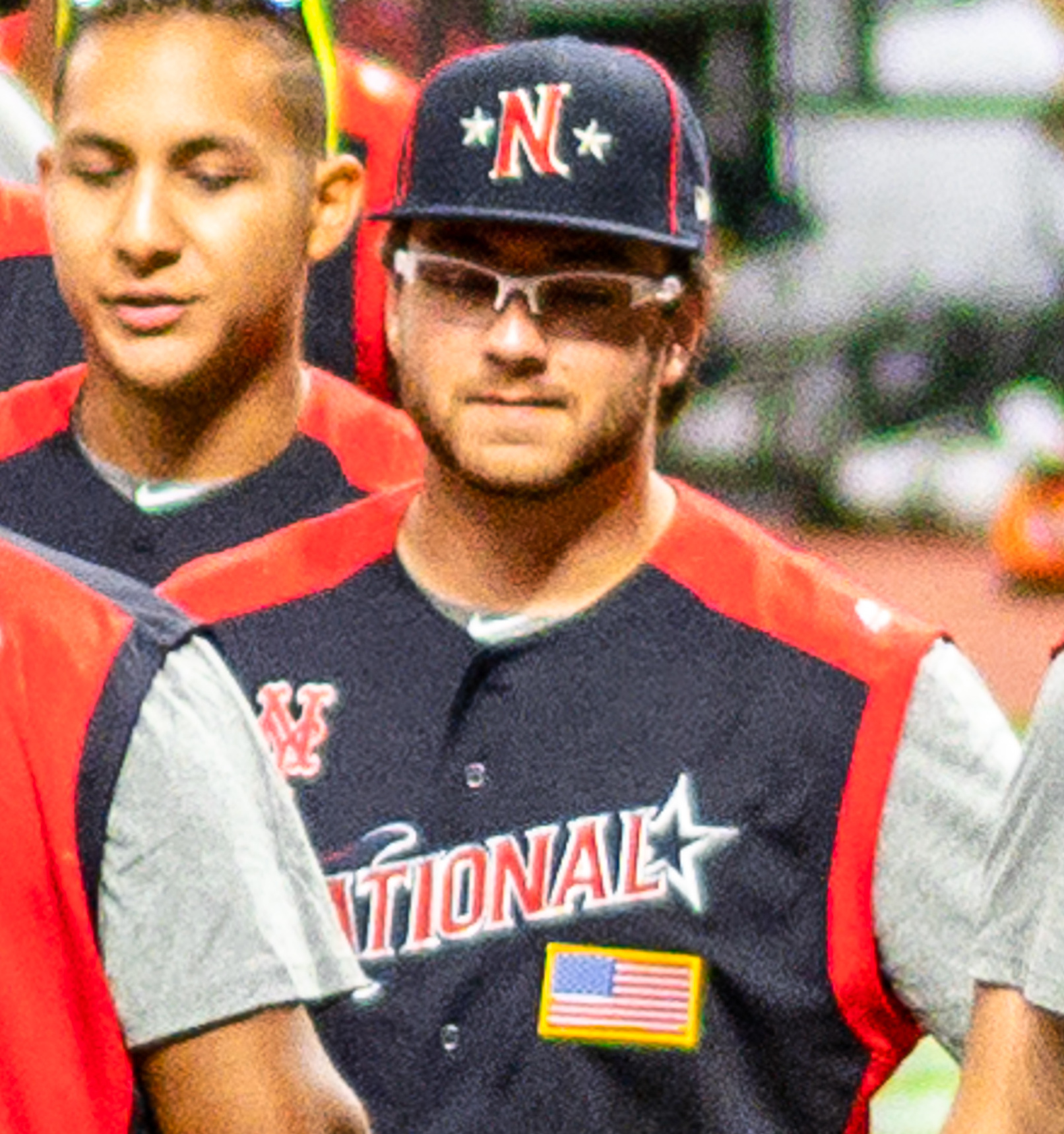
Kay at the All Star Futures Game in 2019

The New York Mets selected Kay in the first round of the 2016 Major League Baseball draft (31st overall) using the compensatory pick they received after the Washington Nationals signed Daniel Murphy. Kay did not appear in any games in the Mets' organization after being drafted and then underwent Tommy John surgery on October 4, 2016, putting him out for the entire 2017 season. He returned in 2018 to play for the Columbia Fireflies and the St. Lucie Mets, combining to go 7–11 with a 4.26 ERA in 122 2/3 innings. In 2019, he opened the season with the Binghamton Rumble Ponies, before being promoted to the Syracuse Mets on June 14. Kay was named to the 2019 All-Star Futures Game.

=== Toronto Blue Jays ===
On July 28, 2019, the Mets traded Kay and Simeon Woods Richardson to the Blue Jays for Marcus Stroman and cash considerations. Kay was added to the major league roster on September 7 to start against the Tampa Bay Rays.

With the 2020 Toronto Blue Jays, Kay appeared in 13 games, compiling a 2-0 record with 5.14 ERA and 22 strikeouts in 21 innings pitched. In 2021, Kay made 11 appearances for the Blue Jays, recording a 5.61 ERA with 39 strikeouts across 33 2/3 innings of work.

Kay dealt with an unspecified injury for most of 2022 and only made one appearance for the big-league club, in which he allowed one run in two innings of work. On December 16, 2022, Kay was designated for assignment following the signing of Chris Bassitt.

=== Chicago Cubs ===
On December 23, 2022, Kay was claimed off waivers by the Chicago Cubs. The Cubs designated him for assignment on January 20, 2023, after the signing of Trey Mancini was made official. On January 24, Kay cleared waivers and was sent outright to the Triple-A Iowa Cubs. In 23 appearances for Iowa, he registered a 4.50 ERA with 32 strikeouts in 28.0 innings of work. On June 13, Kay had his contract selected to the major league roster. In 13 appearances for Chicago, he posted a 6.35 ERA with 8 strikeouts in 11 1/3 innings pitched. On September 11, Kay was designated for assignment following the promotion of Pete Crow-Armstrong.

=== New York Mets (second stint) ===
On September 14, 2023, Kay was claimed off waivers by the New York Mets. He spent most of his stint with the Triple–A Syracuse Mets; in four appearances for New York, he struggled to a 7.36 ERA with three strikeouts in 3 2/3 innings of work. Following the season on October 20, Kay was removed from the 40–man roster and placed on outright waivers.

On October 24, 2023, Kay was claimed off waivers by the Oakland Athletics. On November 6, Kay was removed from the 40–man roster and sent outright to the Triple–A Las Vegas Aviators. He elected free agency the same day.

=== Yokohama DeNA BayStars ===
On January 9, 2024, Kay signed with the Yokohama DeNA BayStars of Nippon Professional Baseball (NPB). Kay made 24 appearances for the BayStars during his first season with the team, compiling a 6-9 record and 3.42 ERA with 119 strikeouts across 136 2/3 innings pitched.

In 155 innings pitched for the team in 2025, Kay led the NPB in ground ball rate, set the team's single-season ERA record at 1.74, and averaged 94.6 miles per hour (152.2 km/h) on his fastball. It was reported that he was expected to seek a contract with an MLB club following the season. On December 2, Kay and the BayStars parted ways.

=== Chicago White Sox ===
On December 9, 2025, Kay signed a two-year, $12 million contract with the Chicago White Sox. In 2026, he set a post-integration single-season record of 26 hit batters. His other stats included a 10–9 record and a 4.44 ERA in 33 appearances (31 starts).
