= José Leger =

Dominican baseball coach (born 1982)

Chicago White Sox – No. 73
- Coach
- Born: May 19, 1982 (age 44); Santo Domingo, Dominican Republic
- Bats: Right Throws: Right

Teams
- Chicago White Sox (2026-present)

José Joaquin Leger is a Dominican baseball coach and former utility player who is currently the first base and outfield coach for the Chicago White Sox of Major League Baseball (MLB).

== Early life and career ==
Leger was born in 1982 in Santo Domingo, Dominican Republic. He attended Georgia College & State University (GCSU), for whom he played baseball. After his time at GCSU, he was signed as an international free agent by the Minnesota Twins in June 2004. He spent his 2005 season in High-A with the Fort Myers Miracle, where he mainly played third base, slashing .279/.327/.352/.679. In 2006, he also played catcher, and whilst he was briefly promoted to the New Britain Rock Cats of Double-A, he failed to hit above the Mendoza line, and spent most of his time in Fort Myers and with the Beloit Snappers in Single-A. He hit .241/.341/.305/.646 that year, his last in professional baseball.

After stepping away from baseball for two years, Leger returned in 2008, first attending a Twins run scouting school on the recommendation of then Twins minor league field coordinator Joe Vavra, earning his first managerial role with the New York Mets in 2010, managing their Dominican Summer League team before moving to the Kingsport Mets in 2012, with whom he won the Appalachian League in 2013. He earned his first professional managerial with a promotion to the Single-A Savannah Sand Gnats in 2015, winning the South Atlantic League manager of the year award for the 2015 season. He stayed with the Sand Gnats after they relocated and rebranded as the Columbia Fireflies in 2016. He was the third base coach for the 2016 All-Star Futures Game.

Leger left the Fireflies after the 2017 season, moving to the St. Louis Cardinals to work as their Latin American Field & Academy Development Coordinator. In 2021, he was hired as the Springfield Cardinals manager, St. Louis's Double-A affiliate. After 4 years in the role, including winning the Texas League Manager of the Year Award in 2024, he was promoted to the roles of assistant minor league field coordinator and baserunning coordinator in the Cardinals organization.

On December 18, 2025, it was announced that Leger would be the third base and outfield coach of the Chicago White Sox. He described the opportunity as 'hard to pass [up].' Less than two weeks after, he was fired as the manager of Gigantes del Cibao in the Dominican Professional Baseball League, which takes place during the American offseason, after three losses in as many games. He has been credited for the White Sox aggressive baserunning.

== Personal life ==
Leger has a wife, with whom he has two sons.

== See also ==
- Georgia College Bobcats
- Dominican Summer League Mets
