= Rikuu Nishida =

Japanese baseball player (born 2001)

Chicago White Sox – No. 51
- Second baseman / Outfielder
- Born: May 6, 2001 (age 25); Hirakata, Japan
- Bats: Left Throws: Right

MLB debut
- May 25, 2026, for the Chicago White Sox

MLB statistics (through 2026 season)
- Batting average: .241
- Home runs: 0
- Runs batted in: 2
- Stats at Baseball Reference

Teams
- Chicago White Sox (2026–present)

Rikuu Nishida (西田 陸浮, Nishida Rikuu; born May 6, 2001) is a Japanese professional baseball second baseman and outfielder for the Chicago White Sox of Major League Baseball (MLB). He made his MLB debut in 2026.

== Amateur career ==
Nishida attended Tohoku High School. He played college baseball at Mt. Hood Community College for two years before transferring to the University of Oregon to play for the Oregon Ducks. During his college baseball career, Nishida would often use a wooden baseball bat instead of a metal one. In 2022, he played collegiate summer baseball with the Hyannis Harbor Hawks of the Cape Cod Baseball League and was named a league all-star.

== Professional career ==
Nishida was selected by the Chicago White Sox in the 11th round of the 2023 Major League Baseball draft as the 329th overall pick, receiving a $170,000 signing bonus.

On May 25, 2026, Nishida was promoted to the major leagues for the first time. When he made his MLB debut against the Minnesota Twins on the same day, he became the first Japanese born and raised player to play NCAA Division I baseball in the United States and play in MLB. Nishida went 1-for-3 with a single, and threw out Orlando Arcia at home plate from right field. He appeared in eleven more games over the following two weeks, managing a .241 batting average and two runs batted in with no walks or extra base hits, before being returned to the minors on June 9 to make room for Chicago's top prospect, Braden Montgomery. Despite a brief promotion in August to replace a bereaving Andrew Benintendi, he did not appear in another major league game in 2026.

== See also ==
- List of Major League Baseball players from Japan
