= Tanner McDougal =

American baseball player (born 2003)

Chicago White Sox – No. 55
- Pitcher
- Born: April 9, 2003 (age 23); Henderson, Nevada, U.S.
- Bats: Right Throws: Right

MLB debut
- August 13, 2026, for the Chicago White Sox

MLB statistics (through 2026 season)
- Win–loss record: 0–0
- Earned run average: 27.00
- Strikeouts: 0
- Stats at Baseball Reference

Teams
- Chicago White Sox (2026–present)

Tanner McDougal (born April 9, 2003) is an American professional baseball pitcher for the Chicago White Sox of Major League Baseball (MLB).

== Career ==
McDougal attended Silverado High School in Las Vegas, Nevada. He was selected by the Chicago White Sox in the fifth round of the 2021 Major League Baseball draft.

McDougal signed with the White Sox and made his professional debut with the Arizona Complex League White Sox. After missing the 2022 season after undergoing Tommy John Surgery, he returned in 2023 and pitched for the Kannapolis Cannon Ballers. McDougal played 2024 with Kannapolis and Winston-Salem Dash and started 2025 with Winston-Salem before being promoted to the Birmingham Barons.

On November 18, 2025, the White Sox added McDougal to their 40-man roster to protect him from the Rule 5 draft. McDougal was optioned to the Triple-A Charlotte Knights to begin the 2026 season. In 15 appearances (six starts) for Charlotte, he recorded a 2.86 ERA with 40 strikeouts across 34 2/3 innings pitched. On August 8, 2026, McDougal was promoted to the major leagues for the first time.
