= Zach Bove =

American baseball coach

Zach Bove (born c. 1989) is an American baseball coach.

Bove played first base at the College of Central Florida and Flagler College.

After his playing career ended, Bove became a high school hitting coach, and continued to coach hitting through the 2012–13 season at the College of Central Florida. He transitioned to pitching with encouragement from Central Florida head coach Marty Smith.

Bove joined the Minnesota Twins organization in 2019, as a pitching coach in the Florida Complex League, and advancing to assistant pitching coordinator for the 2021 and 2022 seasons. He then served as an assistant pitching coach for the Kansas City Royals from 2023. Bove was hired by the Chicago White Sox as pitching coach in November 2025.
