= Noah Schultz =

American baseball player (born 2003)

Chicago White Sox – No. 22
- Pitcher
- Born: August 5, 2003 (age 23); Naperville, Illinois, U.S.
- Bats: Left Throws: Left

MLB debut
- April 14, 2026, for the Chicago White Sox

MLB statistics (through 2026 season)
- Win–loss record: 4–9
- Earned run average: 5.57
- Strikeouts: 67
- Stats at Baseball Reference

Teams
- Chicago White Sox (2026–present)

Noah Chris Schultz (born August 5, 2003) is an American professional baseball pitcher for the Chicago White Sox of Major League Baseball (MLB). He made his MLB debut in 2026.

== Amateur career ==
Schultz attended Oswego East High School in Oswego, Illinois, a suburb of Chicago. In his first start of the season in 2021, he struck out ten batters over four scoreless innings. Schultz opened the 2022 season as a top prospect for the upcoming draft. He missed a period during the season after contracting mononucleosis. Following the end of his high school season, he played for the Illinois Valley Pistol Shrimp of the Prospect League. He committed to play college baseball for the Vanderbilt Commodores.

== Professional career ==
The Chicago White Sox selected Schultz in the first round, with the 26th overall selection, of the 2022 Major League Baseball draft. He signed with the team for $2.8 million.

On April 5, 2023, it was announced that Schultz had suffered a left forearm strain and would miss the beginning of the season. He made his professional debut in early June with the Single-A Kannapolis Cannon Ballers. He made ten starts with Kannapolis before his season ended in mid-August with a shoulder injury. Schultz went 1–2 with a 1.33 ERA, 38 strikeouts, and six walks over 27 innings. He was assigned to the High-A Winston-Salem Dash to open the 2024 season. In late May, he was promoted to the Double-A Birmingham Barons. Over 23 starts between the two teams, Schultz went 0–4 with a 2.24 ERA, 115 strikeouts, and 24 walks over 88 1/3 innings.

Schultz was assigned back to Birmingham to open the 2025 season. In mid-June, he was promoted to the Triple-A Charlotte Knights. Schultz was selected to represent the White Sox (alongside Braden Montgomery) at the 2025 All-Star Futures Game at Truist Park. He was placed on the injured list with knee discomfort in early July and returned to play in late August. Schultz was placed on the injured list once again with a knee injury in September, ending his season. Over 17 starts for the season, Schultz went 4–5 with a 4.68 ERA, 76 strikeouts, and 45 walks over 73 innings. Schultz was assigned to Charlotte to open the 2026 season, going 3–0 with a 1.29 ERA and 19 strikeouts across 14 innings.

The White Sox promoted Schultz to the major leagues to make his MLB debut on April 14, 2026. As the starting pitcher against the Tampa Bay Rays, he pitched 4 1/3 innings in which he gave up three earned runs and four walks while recording four strikeouts. On April 19, Schultz recorded his first career win after allowing one run across five innings of work against the Athletics. On May 26, he was placed on the 15-day injured list with right knee patellar tendinitis. He was activated and returned to the White Sox on July 1. On August 8, Schultz was optioned to Charlotte. He was recalled on September 15 and finished the season with the White Sox as a relief pitcher. With the White Sox in 2026, Schultz pitched in 19 games (14 starts) and ended the season with a 4–9 record, a 5.57 ERA, and 67 strikeouts across 74 1/3 innings. He made his postseason debut in Game 3 of the 2026 American League Division Series and gave up one run across three innings pitched in relief.

== Player profile ==
Schultz is listed at 6 feet 10 inches (2.08 m) and 240 pounds (110 kg), making him one of the tallest players in MLB history. His height, combined with his sidearm delivery, hard fastball, and sweeping slider have earned him comparisons to Hall of Fame lefty Randy Johnson.
