= Derek Shomon =

American baseball coach

Derek Shomon is an American baseball coach.

== Early and personal life ==
Shomon was raised in Glenview, Illinois, and played Little League Baseball for Northbrook. His father died of oral cancer when Shomon was eight years old. In 2008, he graduated from Glenbrook South High School.

Shomon is married to Keriann. Their son was born in March 2023 with cerebral palsy and uses an augmentative and alternative communication device and American Sign Language.

== Coaching career ==
Shomon began his coaching career as a bullpen catcher for the Frontier League's Schaumburg Boomers in 2012. He has also coached in the American Association. In 2021, Shomon joined the Minnesota Twins organization, working one year each as the hitting coach of the Fort Myers Mighty Mussels and Wichita Wind Surge. During the 2023 and 2024 seasons, Shomon was an assistant hitting coach at the major league level. In November 2025, the Chicago White Sox hired Shomon as lead hitting coach.
