= 2025 Washington Nationals season =

2025 Washington Nationals
- League: National League
- Division: East
- Ballpark: Nationals Park
- City: Washington, D.C.
- Record: 66–96 (.407)
- Divisional place: 5th
- Owners: Lerner Enterprises
- General managers: Mike Rizzo (fired July 6); Mike DeBartolo (interim)
- Managers: Dave Martinez (fired July 6); Miguel Cairo (interim)
- Television: MASN (Bob Carpenter, Dan Kolko, Kevin Frandsen, Ryan Zimmerman)
- Radio: 106.7 The Fan; Washington Nationals Radio Network (Charlie Slowes, Dave Jageler)

The 2025 Washington Nationals season was the Nationals' 21st season as the Major League Baseball franchise in the District of Columbia, the 18th season at Nationals Park, and the 57th since the original team was started in Montreal, Quebec, Canada. The Nationals were led by Dave Martinez, in his eighth year as manager, for the first half of the season. On September 13, the Nationals were officially eliminated from playoff contention for the sixth consecutive season. Martinez and President of Baseball Operations Mike Rizzo were both dismissed on July 6.

== Previous season ==
The Nationals finished fourth in the National League East Division in the 2024 season, with a win-loss record of 71–91.

== Offseason ==
Reliever Jacob Barnes and starting pitcher Patrick Corbin became free agents after the 2024 World Series. They were soon joined in free agency by first baseman Joey Gallo, as the Nationals declined their end of a mutual option for the 2025 season, as well as first baseman Joey Meneses, utilityman Ildemaro Vargas, and reliever Michael Rucker, whom the Nationals outrighted from the 40-man roster. Additionally, the Nationals lost starting pitcher Thaddeus Ward to the Baltimore Orioles on a waiver claim on November 4. Ward did not appear in a game for the Nationals in 2024, after spending the 2023 season on Washington's roster as a Rule 5 draft pick. Facing decisions on whether to extend new contract offers for the 2025 season to players eligible for arbitration, Washington declined to tender contracts to two longtime Nationals relievers: closer Kyle Finnegan and former closer Tanner Rainey. Starting pitcher Trevor Williams tested free agency after spending the last two seasons with the Nationals, but he signed another two-year deal on December 31, 2024, to stay in Washington. Finnegan also returned to the Nationals, belatedly accepting the reported $6 million salary the Nationals had offered to avoid arbitration earlier in the offseason.

Washington chose to protect prospects Andry Lara and Robert Hassell III from the Rule 5 draft, adding them to the 40-man roster on November 19. Hassell's promotion to the major league roster came two days after he helped lead the Salt River Rafters to the Arizona Fall League championship. For the third year in a row, the Nationals made a selection in the Rule 5 draft themselves, acquiring Tampa Bay Rays minor league reliever Evan Reifert.

On December 10, the Nationals won the draft lottery, giving them the first pick in the 2025 draft. Going into the lottery, Washington had the fourth best odds of winning the lottery.

The Nationals signed their first major league free agent on December 19, 2024, inking right-handed pitcher Michael Soroka to a reported $9 million contract over one year. Days later, they traded left-handed reliever Robert Garcia to the Texas Rangers for first baseman Nathaniel Lowe. On January 5, the Nationals announced they had reunited with Josh Bell, their primary first baseman in the 2021 and 2022 seasons, on a reported $6 million one-year deal. Washington signed infielder Amed Rosario on January 8 to a one-year contract reportedly valued at $2 million, then inked reliever Jorge López to a $3 million one-year deal on January 11. For the first time in franchise history, the Nationals signed a player posted from Nippon Professional Baseball to a major league contract: left-handed pitcher Shinnosuke Ogasawara, who agreed to a two-year deal to pitch for Washington on January 24. The Nationals added infielder Paul DeJong on a one-year, $1 million contract on February 16. With spring training underway, Washington added to its bullpen mix with a one-year signing of reliever Lucas Sims on February 19.

=== Transactions ===
- November 4, 2024: The Nationals lost right-handed pitcher Thaddeus Ward on a waiver claim by the Baltimore Orioles and outrighted right-handed pitcher Michael Rucker, first baseman Joey Meneses, and third baseman Ildemaro Vargas to the minor leagues; they elected free agency.
- November 19, 2024: The Nationals selected the contracts of right-handed pitcher Andry Lara and outfielder Robert Hassell III from the minor leagues.
- November 22, 2024: The Nationals declined to tender new contracts to right-handed pitchers Kyle Finnegan and Tanner Rainey.
- December 3, 2024: The Nationals signed left-handed pitcher Konnor Pilkington to a minor league contract with an invitation to spring training.
- December 11, 2024: The Nationals selected right-handed pitcher Evan Reifert from the Tampa Bay Rays via the Rule 5 draft.
- December 19, 2024: The Nationals signed right-handed pitcher Michael Soroka to a one-year major league contract.
- December 22, 2024: The Nationals acquired first baseman Nathaniel Lowe from the Texas Rangers for left-handed pitcher Robert Garcia.
- December 31, 2024: The Nationals signed starting pitcher Trevor Williams to a two-year major league contract.
- January 5, 2025: The Nationals signed first baseman/designated hitter Josh Bell to a one-year major league contract.
- January 6, 2025: The Nationals signed outfielder Franchy Cordero to a minor league contract.
- January 8, 2025: The Nationals signed infielder Amed Rosario to a one-year major league contract and designated right-handed pitcher Joan Adon for assignment; he was outrighted to the minor leagues.
- January 11, 2025: The Nationals signed right-handed pitcher Jorge López to a one-year major league contract and designated right-handed pitcher Amos Willingham for assignment; he was claimed off waivers by the Atlanta Braves.
- January 17, 2025: The Nationals signed catcher Andrew Knizner to a minor league contract with an invitation to spring training.
- January 24, 2025: The Nationals signed left-handed pitcher Shinnosuke Ogasawara to a two-year major league contract and released left-handed pitcher Joe La Sorsa.
- February 16, 2025: The Nationals signed infielder Paul DeJong to a one-year major league contract and left-handed pitcher Colin Poche to a minor league contract with an invitation to spring training.
- February 19, 2025: The Nationals signed right-handed pitcher Lucas Sims to a one-year major league contract.
- February 27, 2025: The Nationals signed right-handed pitcher Kyle Finnegan to a one-year major league contract and designated outfielder Stone Garrett for assignment; he was outrighted to the minor leagues.
- March 18, 2025: The Nationals returned right-handed pitcher Evan Reifert to the Tampa Bay Rays.
- March 22, 2025: The Nationals selected the contract of left-handed pitcher Colin Poche from the minor leagues.
- March 26, 2025: The Nationals selected the contract of right-handed pitcher Brad Lord from the minor leagues.

=== Spring training ===
The Nationals held their spring training at the Cacti Park of the Palm Beaches in West Palm Beach, Florida. They invited the following non-roster players to camp: left-handed pitchers Konnor Pilkington and Colin Poche; right-handed pitchers Daison Acosta, Joan Adon, Marquis Grissom Jr., Clay Helvey, Brad Lord, Jack Sinclair, Tyler Stuart, and Jarlin Susana; catchers Andrew Knizner, Caleb Lomavita, and Maxwell Romero Jr.; infielders Brady House, Yohandy Morales, and Cayden Wallace; and outfielders Daylen Lile and Andrew Pinckney.

Outfielder James Wood was hampered early in camp by quadriceps tendinitis. Reliever Zach Brzykcy was also sidelined with a quadriceps injury, as were fellow relievers Jorge López with a hip injury and Derek Law with arm soreness. First baseman Andrés Chaparro suffered an oblique injury that ruled him out for Opening Day despite a strong spring performance. Starting pitcher DJ Herz landed on the injured list at the end of spring training with a sprained left ulnar collateral ligament of the elbow, after demonstrating significantly lower velocity and control issues in games. Both Brzykcy and Law were also assigned to the injured list, while López recovered in time to make the Opening Day roster.

Toward the end of spring training, the Nationals returned reliever Evan Reifert to the Tampa Bay Rays after he struggled with command throughout preseason play, opening a spot on their 40-man roster that the Nationals filled by selecting Poche's contract. Herz was transferred to the 60-day injured list after he was reportedly recommended to undergo Tommy John surgery, with Washington selecting Lord to fill his roster spot.

== Regular season ==
=== Opening Day ===
The season kicked off at Nationals Park on March 27, 2025, against the Philadelphia Phillies. MacKenzie Gore was selected as the #1 Starting pitcher, and he answered the call by striking out 13 Phillies' batters over the course of six innings, only giving up one hit and zero walks, allowing zero runs during his time on the mound. His 13 strikeouts broke a team record for an Opening Day starting pitcher, last held by Max Scherzer, who pitched a 12 strikeout performance in 2019's Opening Day. Unfortunately, the Nationals' offense had trouble taking advantage of Gore's hot start, with only two hits (both by Keibert Ruiz) and one walk (taken by James Wood) throughout their first six innings, though one of Ruiz's hits was a home run, giving the team a 1-0 lead.

However, once both teams turned to their bullpen, the offense increased. Bryce Harper and Kyle Schwarber immediately smacked solo home runs against relief pitchers Lucas Sims and José A. Ferrer, respectively, giving the Phillies a 2-1 lead in the 7th inning. They added a run to their lead in the 8th on a wild pitch by Ferrer, going up 3-1. The Nats managed to put 2 runs across the plate in the 8th inning to tie up the game at 3-3, eventually sending the game into extra innings. However, despite holding strong at the Top of the 10th, Colin Poche was unable to get the 3rd out as the Phillies jumped back in the lead 5-3, and a dropped fly ball by Dylan Crews in right field led to a 7-3 score before Eduardo Salazar slammed the door shut. The Nats went down in order in the bottom of the inning, losing the opener by a 7-3 score despite a strong performance by Gore that earned him 0 ERA to start the season. Sims was credited with a blown save, and Poche with the official loss.

Opening Day Starters
Name	Position
CJ Abrams	Shortstop
James Wood	Left fielder
Luis García Jr.	Second baseman
Josh Bell	Designated hitter
Nathaniel Lowe	First baseman
Paul DeJong	Third baseman
Keibert Ruiz	Catcher
Dylan Crews	Right fielder
Jacob Young	Center fielder
MacKenzie Gore	Starting Pitcher

=== March/April ===
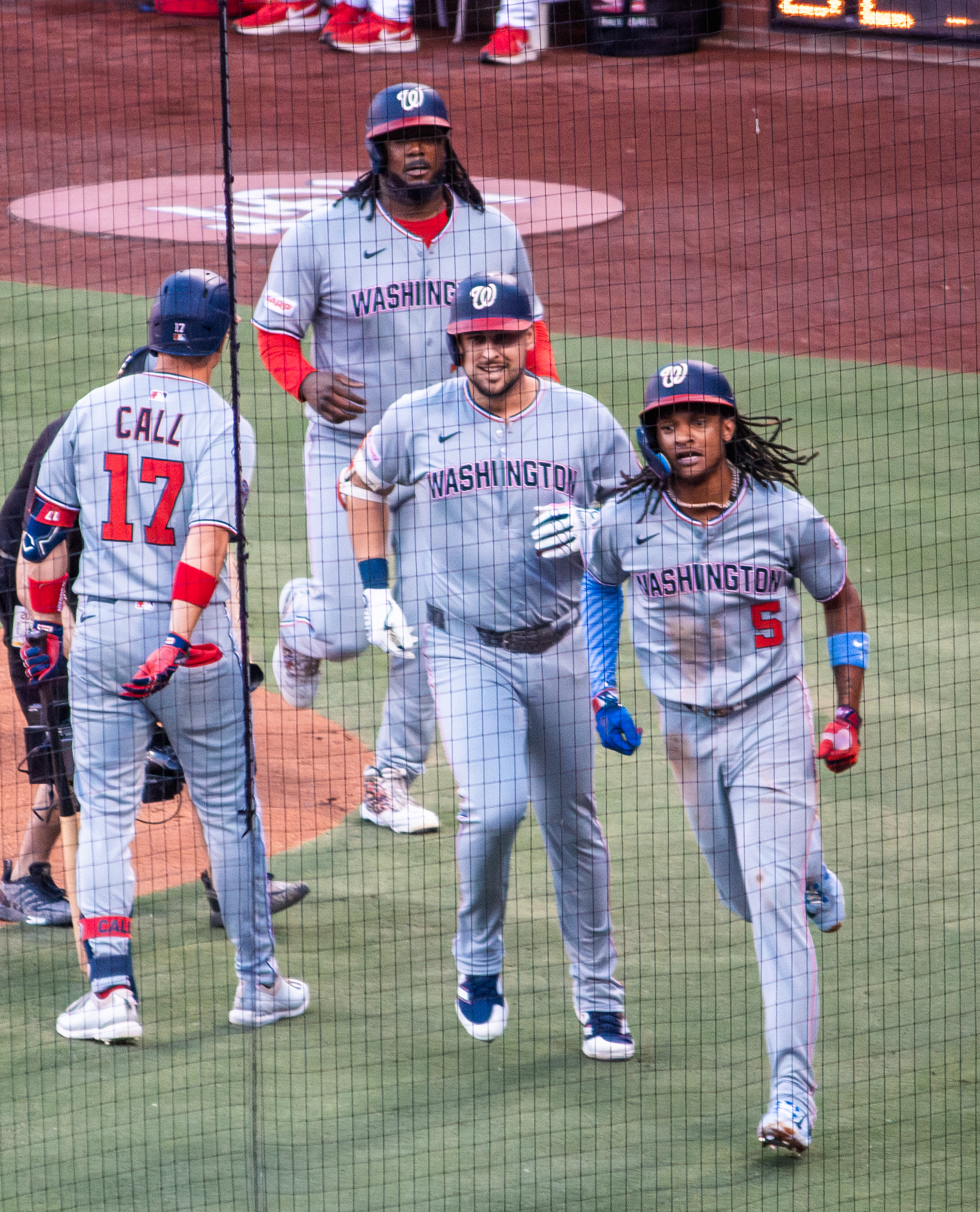
(Top) Josh Bell, Nathaniel Lowe and CJ Abrams score in St.Louis.

The Nationals started off their season poorly, only notching one win in their first 7 games, a 5–1 win against the Phillies on March 30. Brad Lord made his MLB pitching debut in relief that game, but exited with an infinite ERA, having gotten no batters out but 2 walks and a hit that resulted in the Phillies' only run that game. Mitchell Parker notched his first win, and Kyle Finnegan his first save, of the Nats' 2025 season. Dylan Crews started off in a dramatic slump, not even recording his first hit of the season until an April 4th game against the Diamondbacks. In fact, after going 0-3 with a walk and a run scored in the season opener, Crews didn't even get on base until then, and flirted with matching an MLB record for most consecutive strikeouts (by a non-pitcher) over multiple games, ending it with 8 after hitting a groundout on his first at-bat against the Blue Jays on March 31. On the pitching side, the new acquisitions were even worse: Michael Soroka turned in a poor performance in his first 2025 start against the Blue Jays before immediately going on the IL. Meanwhile, Poche and Sims each accrued a double-digit ERA, struggling to get opposing batters out in multiple games. The team arguably reached their nadir on April 28, in a home game against the Mets. Despite putting up solid performances the previous three games, the Nats were decimated 19-5. The team's pitching was so awful that utility infielder Amed Rosario was tabbed to finish the game as a relief pitcher.

However, the Nationals also had some positive signs, rolling into a 4 game win streak split between series against the Diamondbacks and Dodgers between April 5-8. Lord, who had to make a spot start in Soroka's absence, pitched a solid 3 innings and allowed 0 runs while notching 4 strikeouts, 2 of them against the Dodgers' star player Shohei Ohtani. The Nats would win that game 8-2. Closer Kyle Finnegan went a perfect 9/9 in Save opportunities between March 30–April 23. Ruiz re-emerged as a solid hitter, maintaining a .300 or higher Batting Average throughout the month of April, and Wood emerged as a potential home run leader, having hit 9 from the start of the season through April. Following his strong performance on Opening Day, Gore tallied up several strikeouts over his next several starts, and led all MLB pitchers with 59 Ks by the end of April.

=== July ===
After a 37–53 start to the 2025 season, Mike Rizzo and Dave Martinez were fired on July 6, 2025. Mike Rizzo had 19 seasons with the organization. Dave Martinez had eight seasons with the team. At the time of the firings, the Nationals had not achieved a winning season since their World Series run in 2019. They promoted assistant general manager Mike DeBartolo to interim general manager. Mike DeBartolo was with the Nationals since 2012. He started out as an intern, then worked his way up to become the assistant general manager over the past few years. DeBartolo has a background in analytics.

On July 7, 2025, Cairo was named interim manager of the Nationals. He won his first game as the Nationals manager in an 8-2 win against the St. Louis Cardinals on July 9, 2025.

=== Regular season transactions ===
- May 1, 2025: The Nationals signed left-handed pitcher Andrew Chafin to a major league contract and designated left-handed pitcher Colin Poche for assignment; he elected free agency.
- May 6, 2025: The Nationals signed right-handed pitchers Parker Dunshee and Adrian Sampson to minor league contracts.
- May 9, 2025: The Nationals released right-handed pitcher Lucas Sims.
- May 23, 2025: The Nationals selected the contract of outfielder Daylen Lile.
- May 28, 2025: The Nationals signed outfielder Delino DeShields Jr. to a minor league contract.
- May 31, 2025: The Nationals designated right-handed pitcher Jorge López for assignment.
- June 10, 2025: The Nationals claimed right-handed pitcher Ryan Loutos off waivers from the Los Angeles Dodgers.
- June 16, 2025: The Nationals selected the contract of third baseman Brady House and designated first baseman Juan Yepez for assignment.
- July 6, 2025: The Nationals fired manager Dave Martinez and general manager/president Mike Rizzo and promoted assistant general manager Mike DeBartolo to interim general manager.
- July 7, 2025: The Nationals promoted bench coach Miguel Cairo to interim manager.
- July 8, 2025: The Nationals signed right-handed pitcher Luis García to a major league contract.
- July 22, 2025: The Nationals selected the contract of left-handed pitcher Konnor Pilkington.
- July 26, 2025: The Nationals acquired right-handed pitcher Clayton Beeter and minor league outfielder Browm Martínez from the New York Yankees for infielder Amed Rosario.
- July 30, 2025
  - The Nationals traded right-handed pitcher Luis García and left-handed pitcher Andrew Chafin to the Los Angeles Angels for left-handed pitcher Jake Eder and minor league first baseman Sam Brown.
  - The Nationals traded right-handed pitcher Michael Soroka to the Chicago Cubs for minor league shortstop Ronny Cruz and minor league outfielder Christian Franklin.
- July 31, 2025
  - The Nationals traded right-handed pitcher Kyle Finnegan to the Detroit Tigers for minor league right-handed pitchers Josh Randall and RJ Sales.
  - The Nationals traded outfielder Alex Call to the Los Angeles Dodgers for minor league right-handed pitchers Sean Paul Liñan and Eriq Swan.
- August 3, 2025: The Nationals claimed left-handed pitcher PJ Poulin off waivers from the Detroit Tigers.
- August 14, 2025: The Nationals designated first baseman Nathaniel Lowe for assignment.
- August 17, 2025: The Nationals claimed right-handed pitcher Julián Fernández off waivers from the Los Angeles Dodgers.
- August 29, 2025: The Nationals selected the contract of catcher C. J. Stubbs.
- September 1, 2025: The Nationals selected the contract of left-handed pitcher Andrew Alvarez.
- September 2, 2025: The Nationals signed catcher Jorge Alfaro to a major league contract.
- September 3, 2025: The Nationals claimed right-handed pitcher Sauryn Lao off waivers from the Seattle Mariners and designated infielder/outfielder Darren Baker for assignment.

=== Major league debuts ===
- March 30, 2025: Brad Lord
- April 13, 2025: Cole Henry
- May 22, 2025: Robert Hassell III
- May 23, 2025: Daylen Lile
- June 16, 2025: Brady House
- July 2, 2025: Andry Lara
- July 6, 2025: Shinnosuke Ogasawara
- August 5, 2025: PJ Poulin
- September 1, 2025: Andrew Alvarez, C. J. Stubbs

=== Overall ===
==== Season standings ====
===== National League East =====
NL East
Team	W	L	Pct.	GB	Home	Road
Philadelphia Phillies	96	66	.593	—	55‍–‍26	41‍–‍40
New York Mets	83	79	.512	13	49‍–‍32	34‍–‍47
Miami Marlins	79	83	.488	17	38‍–‍43	41‍–‍40
Atlanta Braves	76	86	.469	20	39‍–‍42	37‍–‍44
Washington Nationals	66	96	.407	30	32‍–‍49	34‍–‍47

===== National League Wild Card =====
Division leaders
Team	W	L	Pct.
Milwaukee Brewers	97	65	.599
Philadelphia Phillies	96	66	.593
Los Angeles Dodgers	93	69	.574

Wild Card teams (Top 3 teams qualify for postseason)
Team	W	L	Pct.	GB
Chicago Cubs	92	70	.568	+9
San Diego Padres	90	72	.556	+7
Cincinnati Reds	83	79	.512	—
New York Mets	83	79	.512	—
San Francisco Giants	81	81	.500	2
Arizona Diamondbacks	80	82	.494	3
Miami Marlins	79	83	.488	4
St. Louis Cardinals	78	84	.481	5
Atlanta Braves	76	86	.469	7
Pittsburgh Pirates	71	91	.438	12
Washington Nationals	66	96	.407	17
Colorado Rockies	43	119	.265	40

===== Record vs. opponents =====
====== Record vs. National League ======
2025 National League record Source: MLB Standings Grid – 2025
Team	AZ	ATL	CHC	CIN	COL	LAD	MIA	MIL	NYM	PHI	PIT	SD	SF	STL	WSH	AL
Arizona	—	4–2	3–4	2–4	8–5	6–7	3–3	4–3	3–3	3–3	2–4	5–8	7–6	3–3	2–4	25–23
Atlanta	2–4	—	2–4	5–2	4–2	1–5	8–5	2–4	8–5	5–8	2–4	1–6	1–5	4–2	9–4	22–26
Chicago	4–3	4–2	—	5–8	5–1	4–3	4–2	7–6	2–4	2–4	10–3	3–3	1–5	8–5	3–3	30–18
Cincinnati	4–2	2–5	8–5	—	5–1	1–5	3–4	5–8	4–2	3–3	7–6	4–2	3–3	6–7	2–4	26–22
Colorado	5–8	2–4	1–5	1–5	—	2–11	3–3	2–4	0–6	0–7	2–4	3–10	2–11	4–2	4–3	12–36
Los Angeles	7–6	5–1	3–4	5–1	11–2	—	5–1	0–6	3–4	2–4	2–4	9–4	9–4	2–4	3–3	27–21
Miami	3–3	5–8	2–4	4–3	3–3	1–5	—	3–3	7–6	4–9	4–3	3–3	4–2	3–3	7–6	26–22
Milwaukee	3–4	4–2	6–7	8–5	4–2	6–0	3–3	—	4–2	4–2	10–3	2–4	2–5	7–6	6–0	28–20
New York	3–3	5–8	4–2	2–4	6–0	4–3	6–7	2–4	—	7–6	2–4	2–4	4–2	5–2	7–6	24–24
Philadelphia	3–3	8–5	4–2	3–3	7–0	4–2	9–4	2–4	6–7	—	3–3	3–3	3–4	2–4	8–5	31–17
Pittsburgh	4–2	4–2	3–10	6–7	4–2	4–2	3–4	3–10	4–2	3–3	—	1–5	4–2	7–6	4–3	17–31
San Diego	8–5	6–1	3–3	2–4	10–3	4–9	3–3	4–2	4–2	3–3	5–1	—	10–3	4–3	4–2	20–28
San Francisco	6–7	5–1	5–1	3–3	11–2	4–9	2–4	5–2	2–4	4–3	2–4	3–10	—	2–4	3–3	24–24
St. Louis	3–3	2–4	5–8	7–6	2–4	4–2	3–3	6–7	2–5	4–2	6–7	3–4	4–2	—	5–1	22–26
Washington	4–2	4–9	3–3	4–2	3–4	3–3	6–7	0–6	6–7	5–8	3–4	2–4	3–3	1–5	—	19–29

Updated with the results of all games through September 28, 2025.

====== Record vs. American League ======
2025 National League record vs. American League Source: MLB Standings
Team	ATH	BAL	BOS	CWS	CLE	DET	HOU	KC	LAA	MIN	NYY	SEA	TB	TEX	TOR
Arizona	2–1	2–1	2–1	2–1	2–1	0–3	0–3	1–2	1–2	2–1	2–1	3–0	1–2	4–2	1–2
Atlanta	1–2	0–3	3–3	2–1	3–0	3–0	1–2	1–2	1–2	3–0	1–2	1–2	1–2	0–3	1–2
Chicago	3–0	2–1	2–1	5–1	3–0	1–2	1–2	1–2	3–0	1–2	2–1	1–2	2–1	2–1	1–2
Cincinnati	0–3	2–1	1–2	1–2	5–1	2–1	1–2	2–1	2–1	2–1	2–1	1–2	3–0	1–2	1–2
Colorado	1–2	1–2	0–3	1–2	1–2	0–3	2–4	0–3	2–1	2–1	1–2	0–3	1–2	0–3	0–3
Los Angeles	2–1	1–2	1–2	3–0	2–1	3–0	0–3	2–1	0–6	2–1	2–1	3–0	2–1	2–1	2–1
Miami	1–2	2–1	1–2	1–2	1–2	2–1	1–2	2–1	2–1	2–1	3–0	1–2	3–3	3–0	1–2
Milwaukee	2–1	2–1	3–0	2–1	1–2	2–1	2–1	2–1	3–0	4–2	0–3	2–1	1–2	0–3	2–1
New York	2–1	1–2	1–2	2–1	0–3	2–1	1–2	2–1	3–0	1–2	3–3	2–1	0–3	1–2	3–0
Philadelphia	2–1	2–1	2–1	1–2	2–1	2–1	0–3	2–1	1–2	2–1	2–1	3–0	3–0	3–0	4–2
Pittsburgh	2–1	0–3	2–1	0–3	0–3	4–2	1–2	0–3	2–1	1–2	1–2	0–3	1–2	1–2	2–1
San Diego	2–1	0–3	2–1	2–1	3–0	1–2	1–2	2–1	2–1	1–2	1–2	1–5	0–3	2–1	0–3
San Francisco	5–1	2–1	2–1	1–2	1–2	0–3	3–0	1–2	1–2	0–3	2–1	3–0	1–2	2–1	0–3
St. Louis	2–1	2–1	0–3	3–0	3–0	1–2	2–1	3–3	1–2	3–0	0–3	0–3	1–2	1–2	0–3
Washington	1–2	5–1	0–3	1–2	1–2	2–1	1–2	1–2	2–1	2–1	0–3	2–1	0–3	1–2	0–3

Updated with the results of all games through September 28, 2025.

== Game log ==
Legend
	Nationals win
	Nationals loss
	Postponement
	Eliminated from playoff spot
**Bold**	Nationals team member

2025 Game Log: 66–96 (Home: 32–49; Away: 34–47)
March/April: 13–18 (Home: 9–7; Away: 4–11)

#	Date	Opponent	Score	Win	Loss	Save	Attendance	Record	Streak
1	March 27	Phillies	3–7 (10)	Alvarado (1–0)	**Poche** (0–1)	—	41,231	0–1	L1
2	March 29	Phillies	6–11	Luzardo (1–0)	**Poche** (0–2)	―	38,446	0–2	L2
3	March 30	Phillies	5–1	**Parker** (1–0)	Nola (0–1)	**Finnegan** (1)	28,075	1–2	W1
4	March 31	@ Blue Jays	2–5	Francis (1–0)	**Soroka** (0–1)	García (1)	20,137	1–3	L1
5	April 1	@ Blue Jays	3–5	Green (1–0)	**Ferrer** (0–1)	Hoffman (2)	21,845	1–4	L2
6	April 2	@ Blue Jays	2–4	Lucas (1–0)	**Gore** (0–1)	Hoffman (3)	20,104	1–5	L3
7	April 4	Diamondbacks	4–6	Pfaadt (1–1)	**Ferrer** (0–2)	Martínez (1)	18,974	1–6	L4
8	April 5	Diamondbacks	4–3	**Parker** (2–0)	Rodríguez (0–1)	**Finnegan** (2)	25,916	2–6	W1
9	April 6	Diamondbacks	5–4	**Williams** (1–0)	Burnes (0–1)	**Finnegan** (3)	14,528	3–6	W2
10	April 7	Dodgers	6–4	**Gore** (1–1)	May (0–1)	**Finnegan** (4)	22,546	4–6	W3
11	April 8	Dodgers	8–2	**Poche** (1–2)	Wrobleski (0–1)	―	24,847	5–6	W4
12	April 9	Dodgers	5–6	Yates (1–0)	**Salazar** (0–1)	Treinen (2)	21,014	5–7	L1
13	April 11	@ Marlins	7–4	**Sims** (1–0)	Bender (1–1)	**Finnegan** (5)	9,094	6–7	W1
14	April 12	@ Marlins	6–7	Alcántara (2–0)	**Williams** (1–1)	Faucher (1)	18,469	6–8	L1
15	April 13	@ Marlins	4–11	Henríquez (1–0)	**Gore** (1–2)	―	13,969	6–9	L2
16	April 14	@ Pirates	3–10	Skenes (2–1)	**Lord** (0–1)	―	10,402	6–10	L3
17	April 15	@ Pirates	3–0	**Irvin** (1–0)	Keller (1–2)	**Finnegan** (6)	8,340	7–10	W1
18	April 16	@ Pirates	1–6	Falter (1–2)	**Parker** (2–1)	―	8,529	7–11	L1
19	April 17	@ Pirates	0–1	Heaney (1–1)	**Williams** (1–2)	Santana (2)	12,748	7–12	L2
―	April 18	@ Rockies	Postponed (snow); Makeup: April 20						
20	April 19	@ Rockies	12–11	**Gore** (2–2)	Dollander (1–2)	**Finnegan** (7)	24,606	8–12	W1
21	April 20 (1)	@ Rockies	3–2	**Irvin** (2–0)	Freeland (0–4)	**Finnegan** (8)	24,176	9–12	W2
22	April 20 (2)	@ Rockies	1–3	Senzatela (1–3)	**Lord** (0–2)	Kinley (1)	18,703	9–13	L1
23	April 22	Orioles	7–0	**Parker** (3–1)	Kremer (2–3)	―	29,504	10–13	W1
24	April 23	Orioles	4–3	**López** (1–0)	Soto (0–1)	**Finnegan** (9)	22,246	11–13	W1
25	April 24	Orioles	1–2	Povich (2–1)	**Gore** (2–3)	Bautista (3)	23,058	11–14	L1
26	April 25	Mets	5–4	**López** (2–0)	Stanek (0–1)	―	30,277	12–14	W1
27	April 26	Mets	0–2	Holmes (3–1)	**Lord** (0–3)	Díaz (7)	33,867	12–15	L1
28	April 27	Mets	8–7	**López** (3–0)	Stanek (0–2)	―	30,763	13–15	W1
29	April 28	Mets	5–19	Canning (4–1)	**Williams** (1–3)	Ureña (1)	14,011	13–16	L1
30	April 29	@ Phillies	6–7	Kerkering (3–1)	**Finnegan** (0–1)	―	38,387	13–17	L2
31	April 30	@ Phillies	2–7	Sánchez (3–1)	**Irvin** (2–1)	―	37,713	13–18	L3

May: 14–12 (Home: 4–7; Away: 10–5)

#	Date	Opponent	Score	Win	Loss	Save	Attendance	Record	Box/Streak
32	May 1	@ Phillies	4–2	**Lord** (1–3)	Walker (1–3)	**Finnegan** (10)	37,069	14–18	W1
33	May 2	@ Reds	1–6	Greene (4–2)	**Parker** (3–2)	―	19,509	14–19	L1
34	May 3	@ Reds	11–5	**Williams** (2–3)	Lodolo (3–3)	―	26,224	15–19	W1
35	May 4	@ Reds	4–1	**López** (4–0)	Ashcraft (2–3)	**Finnegan** (11)	23,494	16–19	W2
―	May 5	Guardians	Postponed (rain); Makeup: May 6						
36	May 6 (1)	Guardians	10–9	**López** (5–0)	Smith (1–1)	**Finnegan** (12)	see 2nd game	17–19	W3
37	May 6 (2)	Guardians	1–9	Lively (2–2)	**Lord** (1–4)	—	21,948	17–20	L1
38	May 7	Guardians	6–8	Cantillo (1–0)	**Soroka** (0–2)	Clase (8)	19,896	17–21	L2
39	May 9	Cardinals	0–10	Fedde (3–3)	**Parker** (3–3)	—	27,849	17–22	L3
40	May 10	Cardinals	2–4	Pallante (3–2)	**Williams** (2–4)	Helsley (7)	37,796	17–23	L4
41	May 11	Cardinals	1–6	Mikolas (2–2)	**Gore** (2–4)	―	20,585	17–24	L5
42	May 12	@ Braves	3–4	Iglesias (3–3)	**Rutledge** (0–1)	―	32,696	17–25	L6
43	May 13	@ Braves	2–5	Schwellenbach (2–3)	**Lord** (1–5)	Johnson (1)	32,725	17–26	L7
44	May 14	@ Braves	5–4	**Ferrer** (1–2)	De Los Santos (1–2)	**Finnegan** (13)	37,134	18–26	W1
45	May 15	@ Braves	2–5	Shawver (3–2)	**Williams** (2–5)	Iglesias (7)	34,074	18–27	L1
46	May 16	@ Orioles	5–4	**López** (6–0)	Bautista (0–1)	**Finnegan** (14)	21,171	19–27	W2
47	May 17	@ Orioles	10–6	**Irvin** (3–1)	Gibson (0–3)	—	28,208	20–27	W3
48	May 18	@ Orioles	10–4	**Soroka** (1–2)	Eflin (3–2)	—	37,264	21–27	W4
49	May 20	Braves	5–3	**Parker** (4–3)	Strider (0–2)	**Finnegan** (15)	26,517	22–27	W5
―	May 21	Braves	Postponed (rain); Makeup: September 16						
50	May 22	Braves	8–7 (10)	**Rutledge** (1–1)	Lee (1–2)	―	16,907	23–27	W6
51	May 23	Giants	0–4	Roupp (3–3)	**Gore** (2–5)	―	19,195	23–28	L1
52	May 24	Giants	3–0	**Irvin** (4–1)	Harrison (0–1)	**López** (1)	36,873	24–28	W1
53	May 25	Giants	2–3	Ray (7–0)	**Soroka** (1–3)	Walker (10)	31,581	24–29	L1
54	May 27	@ Mariners	1–9	Evans (3–1)	**Parker** (4–4)	―	19,861	24–30	L2
55	May 28	@ Mariners	9–0	**Williams** (3–5)	Kirby (0–2)	―	19,475	25–30	W1
56	May 29	@ Mariners	9–3 (10)	**Ferrer** (2–2)	Snider (1–1)	―	19,599	26–30	W2
57	May 30	@ Diamondbacks	9–7	**Irvin** (5–1)	Morillo (0–1)	**Finnegan** (16)	29,435	27–30	W3
58	May 31	@ Diamondbacks	11–7	**Soroka** (2–3)	Pfaadt (7–4)	―	29,434	28–30	W4

June: 7–19 (Home: 3–10; Away: 4–9)

#	Date	Opponent	Score	Win	Loss	Save	Attendance	Record	Box/Streak
59	June 1	@ Diamondbacks	1–3	Mena (1–0)	**Parker** (4–5)	Martínez (4)	29,664	28–31	L1
60	June 3	Cubs	3–8	Horton (3–0)	**Williams** (3–6)	―	27,702	28–32	L2
61	June 4	Cubs	2–0	**Gore** (3–5)	Boyd (5–3)	**Finnegan** (17)	21,965	29–32	W1
62	June 5	Cubs	1–7	Rea (4–2)	**Irvin** (5–2)	―	30,402	29–33	L1
63	June 6	Rangers	2–0	**Soroka** (3–3)	Corbin (3–5)	**Finnegan** (18)	27,160	30–33	W1
64	June 7	Rangers	0–5	deGrom (6–2)	**Parker** (4–6)	―	22,670	30–34	L1
65	June 8	Rangers	2–4	Webb (3–3)	**Williams** (3–7)	Garcia (4)	24,897	30–35	L2
66	June 10	@ Mets	4–5 (10)	Garrett (2–2)	**Henry** (0–1)	―	38,472	30–36	L3
67	June 11	@ Mets	0–5	Peterson (5–2)	**Irvin** (5–3)	―	40,681	30–37	L4
68	June 12	@ Mets	3–4	Senga (7–3)	**Soroka** (3–4)	Díaz (15)	38,779	30–38	L5
69	June 13	Marlins	9–11	Phillips (1–0)	**Parker** (4–7)	Faucher (6)	31,098	30–39	L6
70	June 14	Marlins	3–4	Junk (1–0)	**Williams** (3–8)	Faucher (7)	21,129	30–40	L7
71	June 15	Marlins	1–3	Bachar (3–0)	**Gore** (3–6)	Tarnok (1)	28,293	30–41	L8
72	June 16	Rockies	4–6	Vodnik (2–2)	**Finnegan** (0–2)	Halvorsen (4)	11,370	30–42	L9
73	June 17	Rockies	6–10	Senzatela (2–10)	**Soroka** (3–5)	―	17,232	30–43	L10
74	June 18	Rockies	1–3	Márquez (3–8)	**Parker** (4–8)	Halvorsen (5)	20,366	30–44	L11
75	June 19	Rockies	4–3 (11)	**Loutos** (1–0)	Halvorsen (1–2)	―	21,850	31–44	W1
76	June 20	@ Dodgers	5–6	Kershaw (3–0)	**Gore** (3–7)	Scott (15)	46,558	31–45	L1
77	June 21	@ Dodgers	7–3	**Irvin** (6–3)	May (4–5)	―	54,154	32–45	W1
78	June 22	@ Dodgers	7–13	Casparius (6–1)	**Ferrer** (2–3)	―	48,177	32–46	L1
79	June 23	@ Padres	10–6	**Parker** (5–8)	Kolek (3–3)	―	44,074	33–46	W1
80	June 24	@ Padres	3–4	Adam (6–3)	**Williams** (3–9)	Suárez (22)	41,229	33–47	L1
81	June 25	@ Padres	0–1	Pivetta (8–2)	**Gore** (3–8)	Morejón (2)	40,532	33–48	L2
82	June 27	@ Angels	15–9	**Lord** (2–5)	Bachman (1–1)	—	34,289	34–48	W1
83	June 28	@ Angels	2–8	Zeferjahn (5–1)	**Brzykcy** (0–1)	―	39,623	34–49	L1
84	June 29	@ Angels	7–4 (11)	**Finnegan** (1–2)	Brogdon (1–1)	―	33,661	35–49	W1

July: 9–15 (Home: 5–7; Away: 4–8)

#	Date	Opponent	Score	Win	Loss	Save	Attendance	Record	Box/Streak
―	July 1	Tigers	Postponed (rain); Makeup: July 2						
85	July 2 (1)	Tigers	2–11	Smith (1–0)	**Williams** (3–10)	―	13,994	35–50	L1
86	July 2 (2)	Tigers	9–4	**Henry** (1–1)	Kahnle (0–1)	―	16,095	36–50	W1
87	July 3	Tigers	11–7	**Irvin** (7–3)	Enns (1–1)	―	31,599	37–50	W2
88	July 4	Red Sox	2–11	Giolito (5–1)	**Soroka** (3–6)	—	37,355	37–51	L1
89	July 5	Red Sox	3–10	Buehler (6–6)	**Parker** (5–9)	―	34,319	37–52	L2
90	July 6	Red Sox	4–6	Crochet (9–4)	**Ogasawara** (0–1)	Hicks (1)	26,771	37–53	L3
91	July 8	@ Cardinals	2–4	Gray (9–3)	**Irvin** (7–4)	Helsley (18)	20,658	37–54	L4
92	July 9	@ Cardinals	8–2	**Gore** (4–8)	Pallante (5–5)	―	20,956	38–54	W1
93	July 10	@ Cardinals	1–8	Mikolas (5–6)	**Soroka** (3–7)	—	21,141	38–55	L1
94	July 11	@ Brewers	3–8	Priester (7–2)	**Parker** (5–10)	—	35,057	38–56	L2
95	July 12	@ Brewers	5–6	Anderson (2–3)	**Finnegan** (1–3)	―	35,015	38–57	L3
96	July 13	@ Brewers	1–8	Peralta (11–4)	**Irvin** (7–5)	―	32,135	38–58	L4
**All–Star Break (July 14–17)**
97	July 18	Padres	2–7	Peralta (4–1)	**Finnegan** (1–4)	—	22,316	38–59	L5
98	July 19	Padres	4–2	**Parker** (6–10)	Darvish (0–2)	**Finnegan** (19)	31,136	39–59	W1
99	July 20	Padres	1–8	Pivetta (10–2)	**Gore** (4–9)	—	21,996	39–60	L1
100	July 21	Reds	10–8	**Chafin** (1–0)	Singer (7–8)	—	15,558	40–60	W1
101	July 22	Reds	6–1	**Pilkington** (1–0)	Burns (0–2)	—	29,071	41–60	W2
102	July 23	Reds	0–5	Lodolo (8–6)	**Soroka** (3–8)	―	21,567	41–61	L1
103	July 25	@ Twins	0–1	Matthews (2–2)	**Gore** (4–10)	Durán (16)	27,736	41–62	L2
104	July 26	@ Twins	9–3	**Parker** (7–10)	Ryan (10–5)	—	26,928	42–62	W1
105	July 27	@ Twins	7–2	**Irvin** (8–5)	Adams (1–1)	—	20,374	43–62	W2
106	July 28	@ Astros	2–1	**Pilkington** (2–0)	King (3–2)	**Finnegan** (20)	28,786	44–62	W3
107	July 29	@ Astros	4–7	Sousa (5–0)	**Chafin** (1–1)	Hader (28)	35,741	44–63	L1
108	July 30	@ Astros	1–9	Gusto (7–4)	**Gore** (4–11)	—	31,357	44–64	L2

August: 9–19 (Home: 5–11; Away: 5–8)

#	Date	Opponent	Score	Win	Loss	Save	Attendance	Record	Box/Streak
109	August 1	Brewers	9–16	Quintana (8–4)	**Parker** (7–11)	—	25,194	44–65	L3
110	August 2	Brewers	2–8	Woodruff (3–0)	**Irvin** (8–6)	—	28,869	44–66	L4
111	August 3	Brewers	3–14	Ashby (2–1)	**Lord** (2–6)	―	20,066	44–67	L5
112	August 5	Athletics	7–16	Severino (6–11)	**Gore** (4–12)	—	21,636	44–68	L6
113	August 6	Athletics	2–1	**Ferrer** (3–3)	Kelly (2–1)	―	14,980	45–68	W1
114	August 7	Athletics	0–6	Lopez (5–6)	**Parker** (7–12)	—	14,519	45–69	L1
115	August 8	@ Giants	0–5	Teng (1–1)	**Irvin** (8–7)	―	38,679	45–70	L2
116	August 9	@ Giants	4–2	**Lord** (3–6)	Whisenhunt (1–1)	**Ferrer** (1)	38,742	46–70	W1
117	August 10	@ Giants	8–0	**Gore** (5–12)	Verlander (1–9)	―	40,089	47–70	L1
118	August 11	@ Royals	4–7	Lynch IV (4–2)	**Rutledge** (1–2)	Estévez (30)	17,568	47–71	L2
119	August 12	@ Royals	5–8	Wacha (7–9)	**Parker** (7–13)	Erceg (2)	19,333	47–72	L3
120	August 13	@ Royals	8–7	**Ferrer** (4–3)	Estévez (4–5)	―	13,669	48–72	W1
121	August 14	Phillies	3–2	**Ogasawara** (1–1)	Luzardo (11–6)	**Henry** (1)	21,609	49–72	W2
122	August 15	Phillies	2–6	Banks (4–2)	**Beeter** (0–2)	—	35,143	49–73	L1
123	August 16	Phillies	2–0	**Cavalli** (1–0)	Walker (4–6)	**Ferrer** (2)	36,042	50–73	W1
124	August 17	Phillies	9–11	Banks (5–2)	**Poulin** (0–1)	Durán (21)	26,243	50–74	L1
125	August 19	Mets	1–8	Peterson (8–5)	**Irvin** (8–8)	—	23,989	50–75	L2
126	August 20	Mets	5–4	**Lord** (4–6)	Senga (7–5)	**Ferrer** (3)	19,565	51–75	W1
127	August 21	Mets	9–3	**Rutledge** (2–2)	Manaea (1–2)	**Ferrer** (4)	20,127	52–75	W2
128	August 22	@ Phillies	5–4	**Poulin** (1–1)	Durán (6–5)	―	44,757	53–75	W3
129	August 23	@ Phillies	4–6	Nola (2–7)	**Parker** (7–14)	Durán (23)	44,771	53–76	L1
130	August 24	@ Phillies	2–3	Suárez (10–6)	**Irvin** (8–9)	Kerkering (4)	42,580	53–77	L2
131	August 25	@ Yankees	5–10	Schlittler (2–2)	**Lord** (4–7)	―	36,939	53–78	L3
132	August 26	@ Yankees	1–5	Gil (2–1)	**Gore** (5–13)	—	35,531	53–79	L4
133	August 27	@ Yankees	2–11	Fried (14–5)	**Cavalli** (1–1)	—	35,501	53–80	L5
134	August 29	Rays	1–4	Van Belle (1–0)	**Parker** (7–15)	Fairbanks (23)	27,358	53–81	L6
135	August 30	Rays	1–4	Pepiot (10–10)	**Irvin** (8–10)	Baker (3)	26,149	53–82	L7
136	August 31	Rays	4–7	Seymour (3–0)	**Lord** (4–8)	Fairbanks (24)	19,436	53–83	L8

September: 13–13 (Home: 6–7; Away: 7–6)

#	Date	Opponent	Score	Win	Loss	Save	Attendance	Record	Box/Streak
137	September 1	Marlins	2–0	**Alvarez** (1–0)	Bachar (5–2)	**Ferrer** (5)	13,835	54–83	W1
138	September 2	Marlins	5–2	**Cavalli** (2–1)	Mazur (0–2)	**Ferrer** (6)	12,372	55–83	W2
139	September 3	Marlins	10–5	**Rutledge** (3–2)	Pérez (6–5)	―	11,190	56–83	W3
140	September 5	@ Cubs	5–11	Assad (2–1)	**Irvin** (8–11)	―	32,320	56–84	L1
141	September 6	@ Cubs	2–1	**Lord** (5–8)	Boyd (12–8)	**Henry** (2)	38,011	57–84	W1
142	September 7	@ Cubs	6–3	**Thompson** (1–0)	Palencia (1–6)	**Ferrer** (7)	33,343	58–84	W2
143	September 8	@ Marlins	15–7	**Cavalli** (3–1)	Junk (6–3)	―	7,992	59–84	W3
144	September 9	@ Marlins	7–5	**Parker** (8–15)	Mazur (0–3)	**Ferrer** (8)	8,634	60–84	W4
145	September 10	@ Marlins	3–8	Bachar (6–2)	**Irvin** (8–12)	―	9,038	60–85	L1
146	September 11	@ Marlins	0–5	Weathers (2–1)	**Gore** (5–14)	―	10,110	60–86	L2
147	September 12	Pirates	6–5	**Poulin** (2–1)	Nicolas (1–2)	**Ferrer** (9)	18,021	61–86	W1
148	September 13	Pirates	1–5	Mlodzinski (4–8)	**Henry** (1–2)	―	29,887	61–87	L1
149	September 14	Pirates	4–3	**Rutledge** (4–2)	Mattson (3–3)	**Beeter** (1)	20,208	62–87	W1
150	September 15	Braves	3–11	Strider (6–13)	**Parker** (8–16)	—	13,979	62–88	L1
151	September 16 (1)	Braves	3–6	Suárez (2–0)	**Irvin** (8–13)	Iglesias (26)	15,584	62–89	L2
152	September 16 (2)	Braves	0–5 (10)	Kinley (6–3)	**Thompson** (1–1)	—	19,216	62–90	L3
153	September 17	Braves	4–9	Waldrep (5–1)	**Beeter** (0–3)	―	14,420	62–91	L4
154	September 19	@ Mets	6–12	Raley (2–0)	**Alvarez** (1–1)	―	39,484	62–92	L5
155	September 20	@ Mets	5–3 (11)	**Lao** (1–0)	Rogers (4–6)	**Poulin** (1)	43,412	63–92	W1
156	September 21	@ Mets	3–2	**Irvin** (9–13)	Manaea (2–4)	**Parker** (1)	42,960	64–92	W2
157	September 22	@ Braves	5–11	Sale (6–5)	**Gore** (5–15)	—	35,248	64–93	L1
158	September 23	@ Braves	2–3	Waldrep (6–1)	**Lord** (5–9)	Iglesias (28)	37,322	64–94	L2
159	September 24	@ Braves	4–3	**Parker** (9–16)	Elder (8–11)	**Ferrer** (10)	32,898	65–94	W1
160	September 26	White Sox	9–10	Ellard (1–2)	**Ferrer** (4–4)	Taylor (6)	33,938	65–95	L1
161	September 27	White Sox	6–5	**Fernández** (1–0)	Eisert (3–8)	**Ferrer** (11)	24,360	66–95	W1
162	September 28	White Sox	0–8	Smith (7–8)	**Lord** (5–10)	—	22,473	66–96	L1

== Roster ==
2025 Washington Nationals
Roster
Pitchers: 54 Andrew Alvarez; 39 Clayton Beeter; 66 Zach Brzykcy; 24 Cade Cavalli; 53 Andrew Chafin; 65 Julián Fernández; 47 José A. Ferrer; 67 Kyle Finnegan; 9 Luis García; 1 MacKenzie Gore; 99 Cole Henry; 27 Jake Irvin; 73 Sauryn Lao; 72 Andry Lara; 21 Jorge López; 61 Brad Lord; 52 Ryan Loutos; 16 Shinnosuke Ogasawara; 70 Mitchell Parker; 45 Konnor Pilkington; 41 Colin Poche; 50 PJ Poulin; 64 Orlando Ribalta; 79 Jackson Rutledge; 62 Eduardo Salazar; 39 Lucas Sims; 34 Michael Soroka; 71 Mason Thompson; 32 Trevor Williams	Catchers: 15 Riley Adams; 44 Jorge Alfaro; 81 Drew Millas; 20 Keibert Ruiz; 36 C. J. Stubbs; Infielders: 5 CJ Abrams; 19 Josh Bell; 19 Andrés Chaparro; 14 Paul DeJong; 2 Luis García Jr.; 55 Brady House; 38 Trey Lipscomb; 33 Nathaniel Lowe; 26 Nasim Nuñez; 13 Amed Rosario; 8 José Tena	Outfielders: 17 Alex Call; 3 Dylan Crews; 57 Robert Hassell III; 51 Daylen Lile; 29 James Wood; 30 Jacob Young	Managers: 4 Dave Martinez; 22 Miguel Cairo (interim); Coaches: 35 Henry Blanco (coaching/strategy); 25 Ricky Bones (bullpen); 7 Darnell Coles (hitting); 63 Sean Doolittle (pitching strategist); 12 Ricky Gutiérrez (third base); 48 Jim Hickey (pitching); 23 Chris Johnson (assistant hitting); 87 Octavio Martinez (field coordinator); 88 Gerardo Parra (first base); 89 Drew Rossi (bullpen catcher)

== Player stats ==
= Indicates team leader

= Indicates league leader

=== Batting ===
Note: G = Games played; AB = At bats; R = Runs scored; H = Hits; 2B = Doubles; 3B = Triples; HR = Home runs; RBI = Runs batted in; SB = Stolen bases; BB = Walks; AVG = Batting average; SLG = Slugging average

Player	G	AB	R	H	2B	3B	HR	RBI	SB	BB	AVG	SLG
James Wood	157	598	87	153	38	0	31	94	15	85	.256	.475
CJ Abrams	144	580	92	149	35	5	19	60	31	37	.257	.433
Luis García Jr.	139	488	67	123	28	1	16	66	14	27	.252	.412
Josh Bell	140	468	54	112	17	1	22	63	0	57	.239	.421
Nathaniel Lowe	119	440	50	95	17	2	16	68	1	47	.216	.373
Jacob Young	120	324	34	75	10	1	2	31	15	27	.231	.287
Daylen Lile	91	321	51	96	15	11	9	41	8	21	.299	.498
Dylan Crews	85	293	43	61	8	2	10	27	17	24	.208	.352
Riley Adams	83	263	29	49	8	0	8	24	1	18	.186	.308
Brady House	73	261	26	61	11	0	4	29	5	8	.234	.322
Keibert Ruiz	68	255	19	63	12	0	2	25	0	8	.247	.318
Robert Hassell III	70	197	22	44	9	0	3	18	4	8	.223	.315
Alex Call	72	197	30	54	9	2	3	26	1	26	.274	.386
Paul DeJong	57	193	18	44	10	0	6	23	4	11	.228	.373
José Tena	50	152	19	37	13	2	0	16	3	15	.243	.355
Amed Rosario	46	148	19	40	8	0	5	18	1	7	.270	.426
Nasim Nuñez	39	82	13	19	2	0	4	13	9	8	.232	.402
Andrés Chaparro	34	66	4	12	2	0	1	5	0	5	.182	.258
Drew Millas	18	49	6	15	5	1	0	7	2	4	.306	.449
Jorge Alfaro	14	39	3	10	2	0	0	3	1	0	.256	.308
Trey Lipscomb	3	4	1	2	0	0	0	0	0	0	.500	.500
C.J. Stubbs	1	3	0	0	0	0	0	0	0	0	.000	.000
Shinnosuke Ogasawara	1	1	0	0	0	0	0	0	0	0	.000	.000
Totals	162	5422	687	1314	259	28	161	657	132	443	.242	.390

Source:Baseball Reference

=== Pitching ===
Note: W = Wins; L = Losses; ERA = Earned run average; G = Games pitched; GS = Games started; SV = Saves; IP = Innings pitched; H = Hits allowed; R = Runs allowed; ER = Earned runs allowed; BB = Walks allowed; SO = Strikeouts

Player	W	L	ERA	G	GS	SV	IP	H	R	ER	BB	SO
Jake Irvin	9	13	5.70	33	33	0	180.0	195	120	114	62	124
Mitchell Parker	9	16	5.68	33	30	1	164.2	178	116	104	58	103
MacKenzie Gore	5	15	4.17	30	30	0	159.2	152	75	74	64	185
Brad Lord	5	10	4.34	48	19	0	130.2	126	65	63	43	108
Trevor Williams	3	10	6.21	17	17	0	82.2	106	59	57	21	65
Michael Soroka	3	8	4.87	16	16	0	81.1	68	44	44	24	87
José A. Ferrer	4	4	4.48	72	0	11	76.1	81	41	38	16	71
Jackson Rutledge	4	2	5.77	63	0	0	73.1	87	49	47	24	65
Cole Henry	1	2	4.27	57	0	2	52.2	43	27	25	32	52
Cade Cavalli	3	1	4.25	10	10	0	48.2	57	28	23	15	40
Kyle Finnegan	1	4	4.38	40	0	20	39.0	36	21	19	14	32
Shinnosuke Ogasawara	1	1	6.98	23	2	0	38.2	43	30	30	17	30
Eduardo Salazar	0	1	8.38	30	0	0	29.0	47	29	27	16	23
Konnor Pilkington	2	0	4.45	32	0	0	28.1	22	16	14	17	34
PJ Poulin	2	1	3.65	28	0	1	24.2	23	10	10	13	27
Jorge López	6	0	6.57	26	0	1	24.2	25	18	18	7	17
Orlando Ribalta	0	0	7.03	22	0	0	24.1	28	19	19	17	25
Andrew Alvarez	1	1	2.31	5	5	0	23.1	16	8	6	10	20
Zach Brzykcy	0	1	9.00	26	0	0	23.0	28	23	23	12	24
Clayton Beeter	0	2	2.49	24	0	1	21.2	8	6	6	14	32
Andrew Chafin	1	1	2.70	26	0	0	20.0	20	8	6	12	18
Andry Lara	0	0	8.79	9	0	0	14.1	27	15	14	8	10
Lucas Sims	1	0	13.86	18	0	0	12.1	14	19	19	14	13
Mason Thompson	1	1	11.81	14	0	0	10.2	16	16	14	12	11
Luis García	0	0	0.90	10	0	0	10.0	5	1	1	2	7
Ryan Loutos	1	0	12.00	10	0	0	9.0	16	16	12	6	6
Colin Poche	1	2	11.42	13	0	0	8.2	10	12	11	12	10
Sauryn Lao	1	0	3.52	6	0	0	7.2	8	3	3	1	5
Julián Fernández	1	0	3.00	3	0	0	3.0	1	1	1	1	4
Amed Rosario	0	0	36.00	1	0	0	1.0	5	4	4	2	0
Totals	66	96	5.35	162	162	37	1423.1	1491	899	846	566	1248

Source:Baseball Reference

== Farm system ==
Level	Team	League	Manager
Triple-A	Rochester Red Wings	International League	
Double-A	Harrisburg Senators	Eastern League	
High-A	Wilmington Blue Rocks	South Atlantic League	
Low-A	Fredericksburg Nationals	Carolina League	
Rookie	FCL Nationals	Florida Complex League	
Rookie	DSL Nationals	Dominican Summer League	
