= José A. Ferrer =

Dominican baseball player (born 2000)

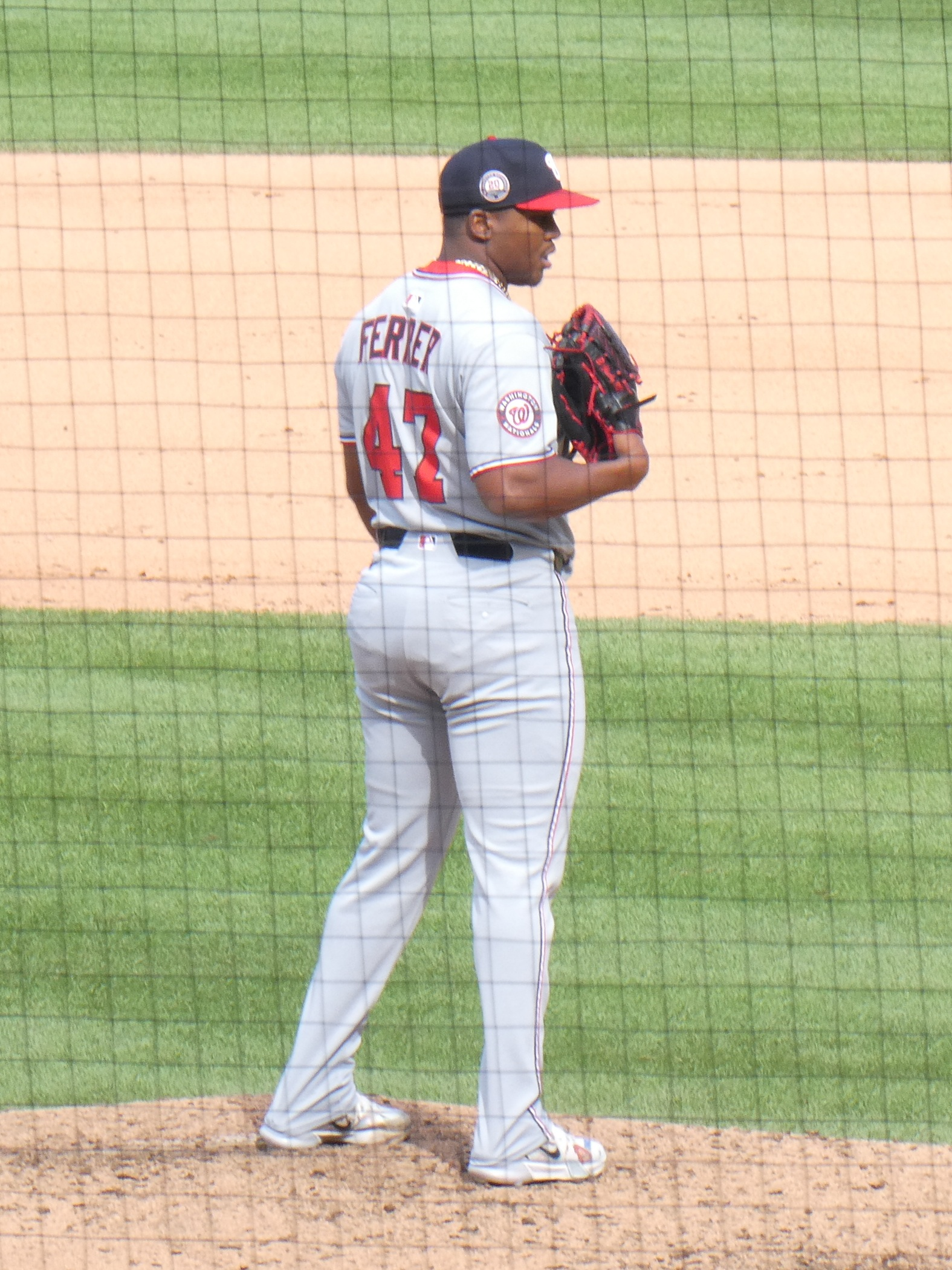
- Ferrer with the Washington Nationals

Kansas City Royals
- Pitcher
- Born: March 3, 2000 (age 26); Maimón, Dominican Republic
- Bats: Left Throws: Left

MLB debut
- July 1, 2023, for the Washington Nationals

MLB statistics (through 2026 season)
- Win–loss record: 12–8
- Earned run average: 4.30
- Strikeouts: 175
- Stats at Baseball Reference

Teams
- Washington Nationals (2023–2025); Seattle Mariners (2026)

José Alexander Ferrer (born March 3, 2000) is a Dominican professional baseball pitcher for the Kansas City Royals of Major League Baseball (MLB). He has previously played in MLB for the Washington Nationals and Seattle Mariners. Ferrer signed with the Nationals as an international free agent in 2017 and made his MLB debut for them in 2023. The Nationals traded Ferrer to the Mariners after the 2025 season and the Mariners traded him to the Royals after the 2026 season.

== Career ==
=== Washington Nationals ===
Ferrer signed with the Washington Nationals as an international free agent on July 2, 2017. He made his professional debut in 2018 with the Dominican Summer League Nationals, posting a 3.60 ERA across 14 relief outings. In 2019, Ferrer spent the year with the rookie-level Gulf Coast Nationals. He pitched in 9 games (2 starts) and registered a 2.91 ERA with 24 strikeouts in 21 2/3 innings pitched. Ferrer did not play in a game in 2020 due to the cancellation of the minor league season because of the COVID-19 pandemic. He returned to the rookie-level in 2021, with the team now called the Florida Complex League Nationals, pitching to a 2.78 ERA with 47 strikeouts in 17 games.

Ferrer began 2022 with the Single-A Fredericksburg Nationals and was promoted to the High-A Wilmington Blue Rocks in late May then the Double-A Harrisburg Senators in late August. He made 48 combined appearances between the three affiliates, recording a 2.48 ERA with 78 strikeouts and 11 saves across 65 1/3 innings of work. He was selected to play in the All-Star Futures Game. On November 15, the Nationals added Ferrer to their 40-man roster to protect him from the Rule 5 draft.

Ferrer was optioned to the Triple-A Rochester Red Wings to begin the 2023 season. In 34 appearances in Triple A, he registered a 3.83 ERA with 33 strikeouts in 40 innings pitched. On June 30, Ferrer was promoted to the major leagues for the first time. In 39 relief appearances in the major leagues in 2023, he was 3–0 with a 5.03 ERA, and 25 strikeouts in 34 innings.

Ferrer was placed on the 60-day injured list to begin the 2024 season after suffering a strain in the teres major muscle in his right shoulder. He was activated from the injured list on July 19. Ferrer made 31 appearances for Washington down the stretch, with a 1–0 record, 3.38 ERA, and 25 strikeouts and one save over 32 innings of work.

Ferrer became the Nationals' closer after they traded Kyle Finnegan at the 2025 trade deadline. In 72 total appearances for the team, he had a 4–4 record, 11 saves, a 4.48 ERA, and 71 strikeouts across 76 1/3 innings pitched.

=== Seattle Mariners ===
On December 6, 2025, the Nationals traded Ferrer to the Seattle Mariners in exchange for Harry Ford and Isaac Lyon.

=== Kansas City Royals ===
The Mariners traded Ferrer, Bryce Miller, and Logan Evans to the Kansas City Royals for Maikel García, James McArthur, and L.P. Langevin on November 18, 2026.
