= Daylen Lile =

American baseball player (born 2002)

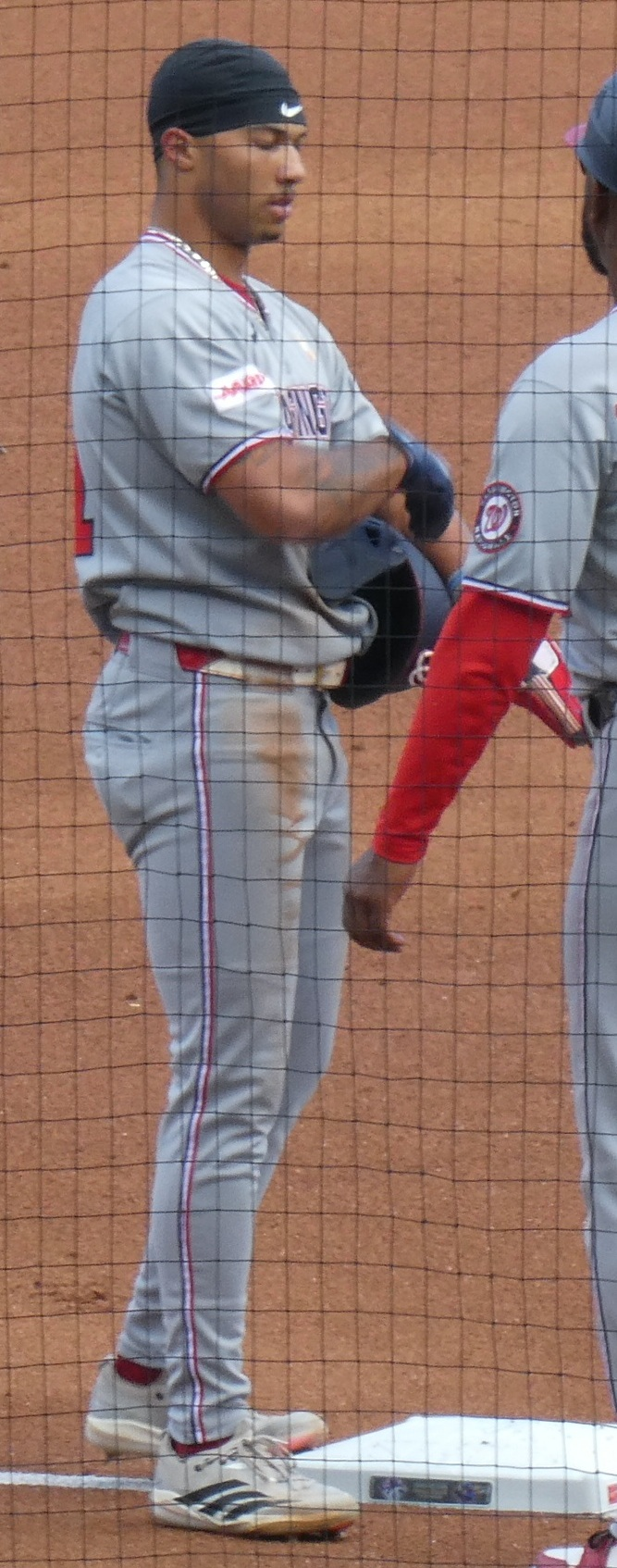
- Lile with the Washington Nationals in 2025

Washington Nationals – No. 4
- Outfielder
- Born: November 30, 2002 (age 23); Louisville, Kentucky, U.S.
- Bats: Left Throws: Right

MLB debut
- May 23, 2025, for the Washington Nationals

MLB statistics (through 2026 season)
- Batting average: .264
- Home runs: 31
- Runs batted in: 130
- Stats at Baseball Reference

Teams
- Washington Nationals (2025–present)

Daylen Anthony Lile (born November 30, 2002) is an American professional baseball outfielder for the Washington Nationals of Major League Baseball (MLB). He made his MLB debut in 2025.

== Career ==
=== Amateur ===
Lile grew up in Louisville, Kentucky and attended Trinity High School. As a senior, he batted .550 with 18 home runs and 61 RBI. Lile had committed to play college baseball at Louisville.

=== Washington Nationals ===
==== Minor leagues ====
Lile was selected in the second round (47th overall) of the 2021 Major League Baseball draft by the Washington Nationals. He was assigned to the rookie-level Florida Complex League Nationals after signing with the team and batted .219 in 19 games. Lile tore his ulnar collateral ligament in his throwing elbow during spring training and underwent Tommy John surgery. After missing the entire 2022 season while recovering from surgery, he to was assigned to the Fredericksburg Nationals of the Single-A Carolina League at the beginning of the 2023 season.

On March 2, 2024, during a spring training game against the Boston Red Sox, Lile was carted off of the field after flipping over the outfield wall while attempting to rob a home run. He was later diagnosed with a lower–back contusion. Lile split the year between the High-A Wilmington Blue Rocks and Double-A Harrisburg Senators, making 130 combined appearances and batting .262/.347/.388 with six home runs, 45 RBI, and 25 stolen bases.

In 2025 Lile hit .337 with three home runs, 23 RBI, and nine RBI in 39 games split between Harrisburg and the Triple-A Rochester Red Wings prior to his promotion.

==== Major leagues ====
On May 23, 2025, Lile was selected to the 40-man roster and promoted to the major leagues for the first time. Lile made his MLB debut that day in a game against the San Francisco Giants. As his fellow rookie outfielder Robert Hassell III had done the day before, he hit the first pitch thrown to him for a single. Lile went on to go 1-for-2, in a 3–0 win for the Nationals. On September 20, Lile hit a two-run inside-the-park home run in the 11th inning of a game against the New York Mets, providing the winning runs in a 5–3 win. It was the first-ever inside-the-park home run in extra innings for a Nationals player. His 14.86 seconds to round the bases was also the Nationals' fastest home-to-home time in the Statcast era.

Lile had a historic end to the 2025 season. He won both the National League Player of the Month and Rookie of the Month awards for September, only the 11th player in MLB history to win both in the same month. In September, he slashed .391/.440/.772 (1.212 OPS) and become the first player since Willie Mays in 1957 to hit seven or more triples and six or more home runs in a calendar month. He finished the year batting .299 with nine home runs, eight steals and an .845 OPS. Despite playing only 91 games, his 11 triples set a franchise record for most by a rookie and tied the Nationals record (2005–present) set by Denard Span in 2013. For the season, Lile also led the Nationals in batting average (minimum 100 plate appearances). Lile finished 5th in voting for the National League Major League Baseball Rookie of the Year Award.

In 2026, Lile led the Nationals in games played (160) and plate appearances (655), slashing .246/.296/.429, with 22 home runs, and 89 RBI. He was tied for fifth in the league in triples, with eight.

Awards
Preceded by Brice Turang	National League Player of the Month; September 2025	Succeeded by Ildemaro Vargas
Preceded by Jakob Marsee	National League Rookie of the Month; September 2025	Succeeded by Sal Stewart
