= Cole Henry =

American baseball player (born 1999)

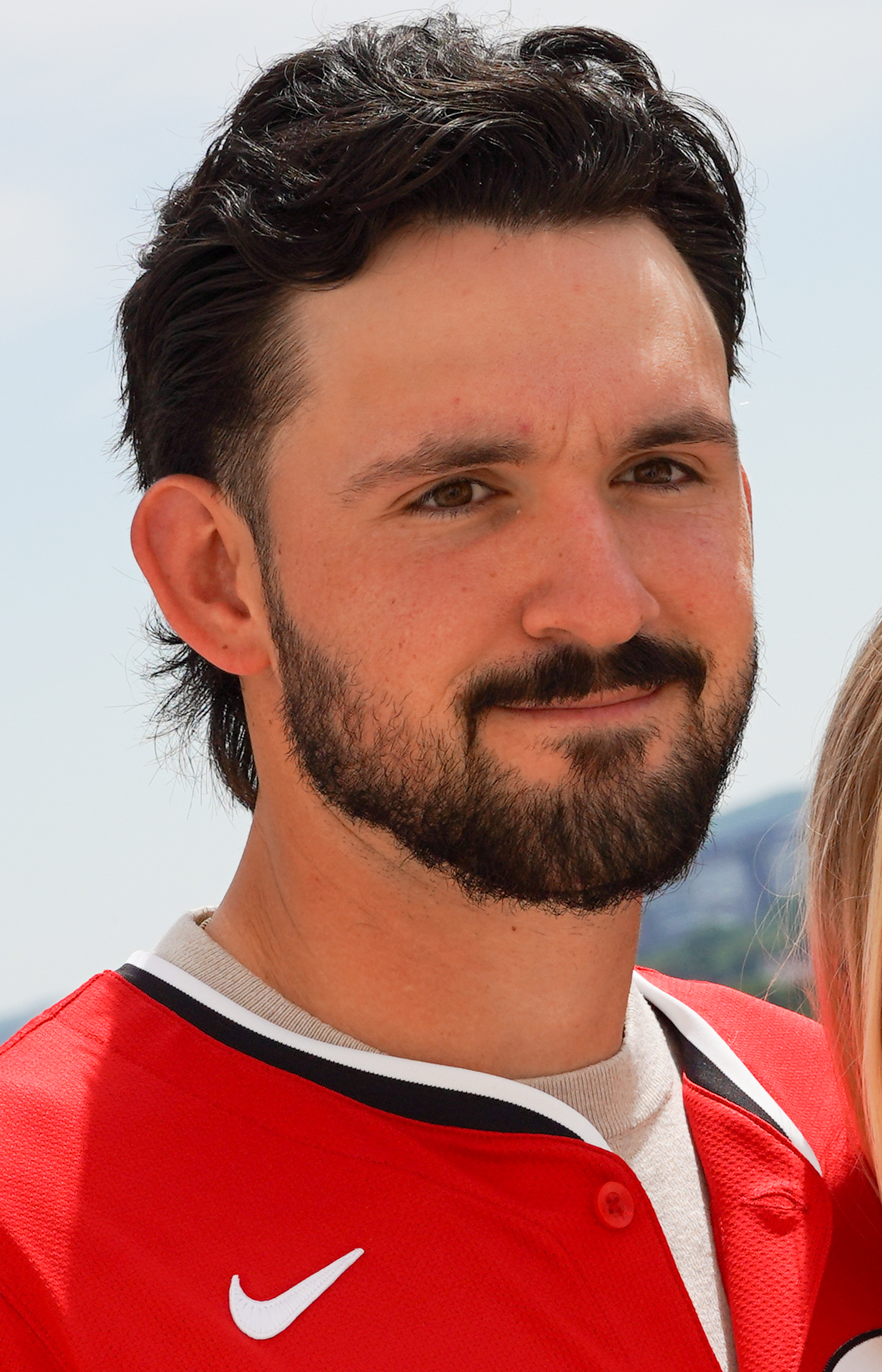
- Henry in 2025

Free agent
- Pitcher
- Born: July 15, 1999 (age 27); Florence, Alabama, U.S.
- Bats: Right Throws: Right

MLB debut
- April 13, 2025, for the Washington Nationals

MLB statistics (through 2026 season)
- Win–loss record: 1–4
- Earned run average: 5.02
- Strikeouts: 67
- Stats at Baseball Reference

Teams
- Washington Nationals (2025–2026)

Jeffrey Cole Henry (born July 15, 1999) is an American professional baseball pitcher who is a free agent. He has previously played in Major League Baseball (MLB) for the Washington Nationals.

== Career ==
Henry is from Florence, Alabama, and attended Louisiana State University (LSU), where he played college baseball for the LSU Tigers. As a freshman, he was voted onto the 2019 NCAA Baton Rouge Regional All-Tournament team. He was also named one of the Southeastern Conference's Freshman of the Week on April 19, 2019. As a sophomore, Henry was the Friday night starter for the Tigers, prior to the cancellation of the 2020 baseball season due to the COVID-19 pandemic. That June, Henry was drafted in the second round of the 2020 draft by the Washington Nationals and chose to turn pro. As of December 2020, he was ranked as the Nationals' third-best prospect by MLB Pipeline.

Henry appeared in one game with the Nationals during 2021 spring training. He was assigned to the High-A Wilmington Blue Rocks, alongside other top prospects, to begin the season. After missing time during the 2021 season with injuries, Henry was invited to participate in the Arizona Fall League alongside seven other Nationals prospects. Henry pitched as both a starter and a reliever for the Surprise Saguaros and was named to represent the Nationals in the Fall Stars Game, although he was unable to play.

Henry made 9 starts in 2022, split between the Double-A Harrisburg Senators and Triple-A Rochester Red Wings. In 31.2 innings pitched, he logged a 1.71 ERA with 34 strikeouts. On August 28, 2022, he underwent season-ending surgery to address thoracic outlet syndrome. The procedure involved removing his first rib and a neck muscle.

On May 18, 2023, Henry returned to action, making a rehab start for the Single-A Fredericksburg Nationals.

On November 14, 2023, the Nationals added Henry to their 40-man roster to protect him from the Rule 5 draft. He was optioned to the Double–A Harrisburg Senators to begin the 2024 season. In 8 games (5 starts) split between Harrisburg and Wilmington, Henry compiled an 0-1 record and 3.31 ERA with 17 strikeouts across 16 1/3 innings pitched.

During spring training in 2025, Henry was transitioned to the bullpen for the first time. He was optioned to the Triple-A Rochester Red Wings to begin the 2025 season. On April 13, the Nationals promoted Henry to the big leagues for the first time following an injury to Orlando Ribalta. He made his debut the same day, striking out Matt Mervis and Javier Sanoja in a game against the Miami Marlins at loanDepot park. On July 2, Henry recorded his first career win after tossing a scoreless eighth inning against the Detroit Tigers.

Henry made 11 appearances for Washington in 2026, struggling to an 0–2 record and 7.90 ERA with 15 strikeouts across 13 2/3 innings pitched. On September 21, 2026, Henry was released by the Nationals.

== Pitching style ==
A right-handed pitcher, Henry commands a fastball that touches 97 miles per hour (156 km/h) and has an above-average changeup.
