= Daison Acosta =

Free agent
- Pitcher
- Born: August 24, 1998 (age 28); Paraíso, Dominican Republic
- Bats: Right Throws: Right
- Stats at Baseball Reference

Daison Maquier Acosta (born August 24, 1998) is a Dominican professional baseball pitcher who is a free agent.

== Career ==
Acosta began his professional career in the New York Mets organization. After the 2023 season, the Washington Nationals selected him in the minor league phase of the Rule 5 draft.

Acosta split 2025 between the Single-A Fredericksburg Nationals, Double-A Harrisburg Senators, and Triple-A Rochester Red Wings, accumulating a combined 5–1 record and 2.42 ERA with 72 strikeouts and five saves across 46 appearances. He elected free agency following the season on November 6, 2025.

On December 8, 2025, Acosta signed a one-year, major league contract with the San Diego Padres. On March 9, 2026, Acosta was removed from the 40-man roster and sent outright to the Triple-A El Paso Chihuahuas. In 26 games (two starts) across 4 levels of the minors he threw 40 innings going 0–0 with a 4.95 ERA and 36 strikeouts. He elected free agency on November 2.
