= Andry Lara =

Venezuelan baseball player (born 2003)

Free agent
- Pitcher
- Born: January 6, 2003 (age 23); Coro, Falcón, Venezuela
- Bats: Right Throws: Right

MLB debut
- July 2, 2025, for the Washington Nationals

MLB statistics (through 2025 season)
- Win–loss record: 0–0
- Earned run average: 8.79
- Strikeouts: 10
- Stats at Baseball Reference

Teams
- Washington Nationals (2025)

Andry José Lara (born January 6, 2003) is a Venezuelan professional baseball pitcher who is a free agent. He made his Major League Baseball (MLB) debut in 2025.

== Career ==
Lara trained at Zulia Academy as an amateur, overcoming knee problems as a youth and adding considerable velocity as he grew in strength. By age 16, his fastball could run up to 96 miles per hour (154 km/h). MLB Pipeline considered him the sixteenth-best prospect in the 2019 international amateur free agent class and the best overall pitcher. The Washington Nationals signed Lara for a reported $1.25 million bonus on July 2, 2019. He was the Nationals' top-ranked international signee for the period. Lara did not appear for the organization in 2019, and did not play in a game in 2020 due to the cancellation of the minor league season because of the COVID-19 pandemic.

In 2021, Lara made his professional debut, advancing during the minor league season from the rookie–level Florida Complex League Nationals to the Low–A Fredericksburg Nationals while appearing primarily as a starting pitcher.

Lara made 23 starts for Single-A Fredericksburg in 2022, compiling a 3-8 record and 5.51 ERA with 105 strikeouts across 101 1/3 innings pitched. He spent the 2023 season with the High-A Wilmington Blue Rocks. In 23 starts for the team, Lara registered a 6-8 record and 4.58 ERA with 66 strikeouts across 98 1/3 innings pitched.

Lara spent the 2024 campaign with Wilmington and the Double–A Harrisburg Senators, compiling an 11–11 record and 3.34 ERA with 132 strikeouts across 134 2/3 innings pitched over 25 starts. On November 19, 2024, the Nationals added Lara to their 40-man roster to protect him from the Rule 5 draft.

Lara was optioned to the Triple-A Rochester Red Wings to begin the 2025 season. On April 20, 2025, Lara was promoted to the major leagues for the first time as the 27th man for Washington's doubleheader against the Colorado Rockies. He did not appear in either game and was optioned back to Rochester to the following day, becoming a phantom ballplayer. On July 2, Lara was promoted to the major leagues for a second time and made his major league debut. In nine appearances for Washington, he struggled to an 8.79 ERA with 10 strikeouts across 14 1/3 innings pitched.

On January 20, 2026, Lara was designated for assignment by the Nationals following the acquisition of Mickey Gasper. He cleared waivers and was sent outright to Rochester on January 27. In 34 games (20 starts) with Triple-A Rochester Red Wings he threw 110 innings going 2-6 with a 5.32 ERA and 91 strikeouts. He elected free agency on November 2.

== Pitching profile ==
Lara is right-handed and was described by MLB Pipeline at the time of his signing as a potential future frontline starter. Along with a two-seam fastball that sits in the mid-90s, Lara throws a breaking ball and a changeup.
