= PJ Poulin =

American baseball player (born 1996)

Free agent
- Pitcher
- Born: July 25, 1996 (age 30); Marion, Massachusetts, U.S.
- Bats: Right Throws: Left

MLB debut
- August 5, 2025, for the Washington Nationals

MLB statistics (through 2026 season)
- Win–loss record: 5–1
- Earned run average: 3.08
- Strikeouts: 52
- Stats at Baseball Reference

Teams
- Washington Nationals (2025–2026)

Peter Arthur Poulin (born July 25, 1996) is an American professional baseball pitcher who is a free agent. He made his Major League Baseball (MLB) debut in 2025.

== Amateur career ==
A native of Marion, Massachusetts, Poulin attended Tabor Academy and played college baseball at the University of Connecticut. In 2017, he played collegiate summer baseball with the Bourne Braves of the Cape Cod Baseball League.

== Professional career ==
=== Colorado Rockies ===
Poulin was drafted by the Colorado Rockies in the 11th round, with the 336th overall selection, of the 2018 Major League Baseball draft. He made his professional debut with the Low-A Boise Hawks, recording a 1.96 ERA over 24 games. Poulin made 54 appearances for the Single-A Asheville Tourists in 2019, posting a 3–3 record and 2.90 ERA with 67 strikeouts and 13 saves over 59 innings of work.

Poulin did not play in a game in 2020 due to the cancellation of the minor league season because of the COVID-19 pandemic. He returned to action in 2021 with the High-A Spokane Indians and Double-A Hartford Yard Goats. In 44 appearances split between the two affiliates, Poulin compiled an aggregate 3–1 record and 3.63 ERA with 59 strikeouts and four saves across 44 2/3 innings pitched.

In 2022, Poulin split the season between Hartford and the Triple-A Albuquerque Isotopes. In 55 total appearances out of the bullpen, he logged a combined 8–1 record and 4.15 ERA with 79 strikeouts and six saves over 60 2/3 innings of work. Poulin made 32 appearances for the Triple-A Albuquerque Isotopes in 2023, registering a 3–3 record and 5.44 ERA with 39 strikeouts across 49 2/3 innings pitched.

=== Detroit Tigers ===
On March 24, 2024, Poulin was traded to the Detroit Tigers in exchange for cash considerations. He split the year between the Double-A Erie SeaWolves and Triple-A Toledo Mud Hens, accumulating a combined 2–1 record and 2.10 ERA with 73 strikeouts in 60 innings pitched across 45 games.

On July 6, 2025, the Tigers added Poulin to their 40-man roster after he exercised an upward mobility clause in his contract; he was subsequently optioned back to Triple-A Toledo. Poulin was designated for assignment by the Tigers on July 31, to clear roster space for pitcher Charlie Morton, who was acquired at the trade deadline.

=== Washington Nationals ===
On August 3, 2025, Poulin was claimed off waivers by the Washington Nationals. On August 5, Poulin was promoted to the major leagues for the first time. In his major league debut at Nationals Park in Washington, D.C., that evening, he pitched a scoreless sixth inning against the Athletics, giving up two singles but finishing his outing with a strikeout. On August 22, Poulin recorded his first career win, tossing two scoreless innings of relief against the Philadelphia Phillies. On September 20, he recorded his first career save, tossing a scoreless inning against the New York Mets.

Poulin made 35 appearances (including 11 starts) for the Nationals in 2026, logging a 3–0 record and 2.70 ERA with 25 strikeouts and three saves across 36 2/3 innings pitched. On November 2, 2026, Poulin was removed from the 40–man roster and elected free agency.
