= Julián Fernández (baseball) =

Dominican baseball player (born 1995)

Free agent
- Pitcher
- Born: December 5, 1995 (age 30); Boca Chica, Dominican Republic
- Bats: Right Throws: Right

MLB debut
- September 5, 2021, for the Colorado Rockies

MLB statistics (through April 23, 2026)
- Win–loss record: 1–0
- Earned run average: 6.89
- Strikeouts: 12
- Stats at Baseball Reference

Teams
- Colorado Rockies (2021); Los Angeles Dodgers (2025); Washington Nationals (2025–2026)

Julián Antonio Fernández (born December 5, 1995) is a Dominican professional baseball pitcher who is a free agent. He has previously played in Major League Baseball (MLB) for the Colorado Rockies, Los Angeles Dodgers, and Washington Nationals.

== Career ==
=== Colorado Rockies ===
Fernández signed with the Colorado Rockies in July 2012 as an international free agent. He made his professional debut in 2013 with the Rookie-level Dominican Summer League (DSL) Rockies where he compiled a 1–1 win–loss record and a 7.94 earned run average (ERA) in ten games. In 2014, he returned to the DSL, posting a 1–0 record and 5.60 ERA in 18 relief appearances, and in 2015, he split time between the DSL and the Rookie-level Grand Junction Rockies, pitching to a combined 3–2 record, 3.55 ERA and 1.11 WHIP in 28 total games between the two clubs. He spent 2016 with the Low-A Boise Hawks, going 1–2 with a 1.17 ERA in 21 appearances out of the bullpen and spent the 2017 season with the Single-A Asheville Tourists, posting a 1–2 record and 3.26 ERA with 57 strikeouts in 51 games.

On December 14, 2017, the San Francisco Giants selected Fernández from the Rockies organization with the second pick in the Rule 5 draft. However, he underwent Tommy John surgery and missed the entire 2018 season. On November 19, 2018, Fernández was claimed off waivers by the Miami Marlins. He spent the 2019 season on the 60–day injured list while recovering from the surgery and did not appear in a game, as he suffered a set-back with more elbow issues during the year.

On October 19, 2019, Fernández was removed from the Marlins' 40-man roster and returned to the Rockies organization. He did not play a minor league game in 2020 since the season was cancelled due to the COVID-19 pandemic. In 2021, Fernández pitched for the Double-A Hartford Yard Goats and the Triple-A Albuquerque Isotopes. In 44 games, he was 3–2 with a 3.38 ERA.

The Rockies promoted Fernández to the major leagues on September 1. He made his MLB debut on September 5, allowing three earned runs in 1 2/3 innings against the Atlanta Braves. He picked up his first MLB strikeout against Dansby Swanson of the Braves. He pitched in 6 2/3 innings over six games for the Rockies, allowing eight runs on nine hits (two home runs) while walking four and striking out four.

Fernández was designated for assignment on June 11, 2022. He cleared waivers on June 16 and was sent outright to Albuquerque. In 58 games in the minors in 2022, he was 2–5 with a 7.26 ERA. On October 12, Fernández elected free agency.

=== Toronto Blue Jays ===
On December 29, 2022, Fernández signed a minor league contract with the Toronto Blue Jays. He was assigned to the Triple-A Buffalo Bisons to begin the 2023 season, where he struggled to a 10.61 ERA with five strikeouts in 9 1/3 innings pitched across seven appearances. On May 25, 2023, Fernández was released by the Blue Jays organization.

=== El Águila de Veracruz ===
On January 22, 2024, Fernández signed with El Águila de Veracruz of the Mexican League. In 34 appearances for Veracruz, he compiled a 1–1 record and 1.82 ERA with 43 strikeouts and 19 saves across 34 2/3 innings pitched. He became a free agent following the season.

=== Los Angeles Dodgers ===
On December 20, 2024, Fernández signed a minor league contract with the Los Angeles Dodgers. He was assigned to the Triple-A Oklahoma City Comets to start the 2025 season and on July 7 his contract was purchased by the Dodgers and he was recalled to the major league roster. Fernández pitched in one game for the Dodgers, allowing two runs on two hits in two innings of work that same day. In 35 games for Oklahoma City, he was 3–0 with a 3.05 ERA and 49 strikeouts. Fernández was designated for assignment on August 15, following the team's acquisition of Buddy Kennedy.

=== Washington Nationals ===
On August 17, 2025, Fernández was claimed off waivers by the Washington Nationals. On September 27, Fernández recorded his first career win, tossing a scoreless inning against the Chicago White Sox. He made three appearances for Washington, recording a 3.00 ERA with four strikeouts over three innings of work.

Fernández was optioned to the Triple-A Rochester Red Wings to begin the 2026 season. In three appearances for Washington, he recorded a 2.25 ERA with three strikeouts over four innings of work. Fernández was designated for assignment by the Nationals following the acquisition of Jhancarlos Lara on June 12. He was released by the team on June 17.

== See also ==
- Rule 5 draft results
