= Mitchell Parker =

American baseball player (born 1999)

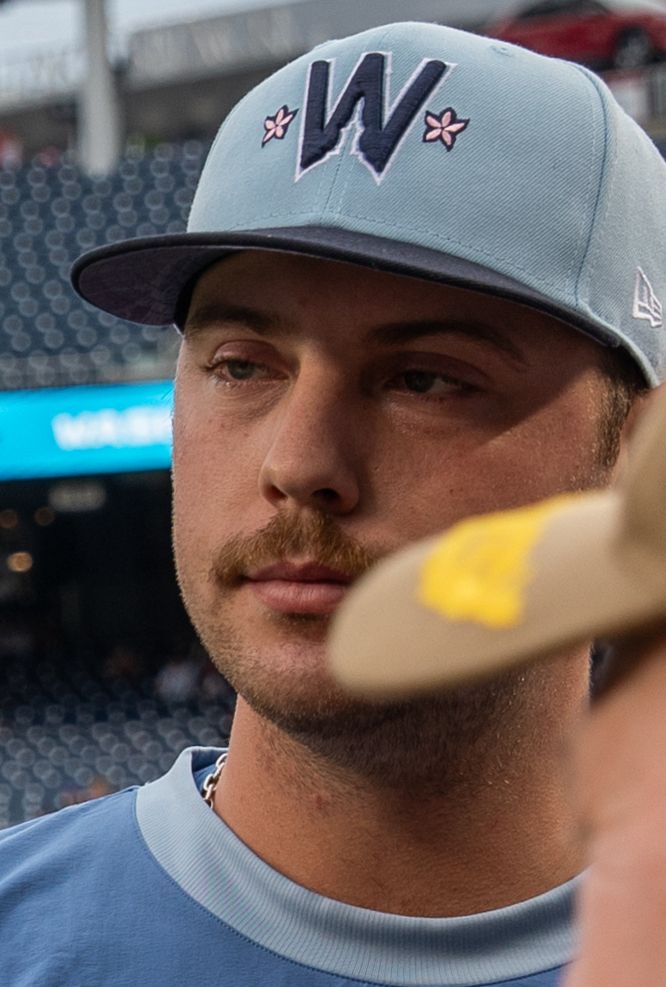
- Parker with the Washington Nationals in 2025

Atlanta Braves
- Pitcher
- Born: September 27, 1999 (age 27); Albuquerque, New Mexico, U.S.
- Bats: Left Throws: Left

MLB debut
- April 15, 2024, for the Washington Nationals

MLB statistics (through 2026 season)
- Win–loss record: 19–29
- Earned run average: 5.19
- Strikeouts: 270
- Stats at Baseball Reference

Teams
- Washington Nationals (2024–2026)

Mitchell James Parker (born September 27, 1999) is an American professional baseball pitcher for the Atlanta Braves of Major League Baseball (MLB). He has previously played in MLB for the Washington Nationals.

== Amateur ==
Parker grew up in Albuquerque, New Mexico and attended Manzano High School. Parker was selected in the 28th round of the 2018 Major League Baseball draft by the Chicago Cubs, but opted not to sign with the team.

Parker played junior college baseball at San Jacinto College. He posted a 6–0 record with 111 strikeouts and a 1.54 ERA in 64 1/3 innings over 13 starts in his freshman season. Parker was selected in the 27th round of the 2019 Major League Baseball draft by the Tampa Bay Rays, but decided to return to San Jacinto for a second season. In his sophomore season, Parker went 5–0 with a 1.19 ERA and 64 strikeouts in 30 1/3 innings pitched over six starts before the season was cut short due to the coronavirus pandemic.

== Professional career ==
=== Washington Nationals ===
The Washington Nationals selected Parker in the fifth round of the 2020 Major League Baseball draft. He signed with the team on June 23, 2020, and received a $100,000 signing bonus. Parker was assigned to the Fredericksburg Nationals of Low-A East to start the 2021 season. He was promoted to the High-A Wilmington Blue Rocks on July 13, 2021, after going 3–7 with a 4.08 ERA and 85 strikeouts over 57 1/3 innings pitched with Fredericksburg. Parker finished the season with a 4–12 record and a 4.87 ERA with 144 strikeouts in 101 2/3 innings pitched.

On November 14, 2023, the Nationals added Parker to their 40-man roster to protect him from the Rule 5 draft. He was optioned to the Triple–A Rochester Red Wings to begin the 2024 season. On April 15, 2024, the Nationals promoted Parker to the major leagues for the first time, optioning Amos Willingham to Triple-A to making room for the former on the active roster. Parker was named the starting pitcher against the Los Angeles Dodgers on Jackie Robinson Day in his debut. He logged five innings, recording three strikeouts and the win. In his second-career outing, Parker started a home game against the Houston Astros, pitching seven innings, recording eight strikeouts, and not allowing a single run. He made 29 starts for Washington during his rookie campaign, compiling a 7-10 record and 4.29 ERA with 133 strikeouts over 151 innings of work.

Parker made 33 appearances (including 30 starts) for the Nationals during the 2025 campaign, accumulating a 9-16 record and 5.68 ERA with 103 strikeouts and one save across 164 2/3 innings pitched.

Parker was optioned to Triple-A Rochester to begin the 2026 season. He was recalled to the major league club on April 14, 2026. Parker made 22 appearances for Washington, logging a 3–3 record and 6.58 ERA with 34 strikeouts and one save across 39 2/3 innings pitched. On July 30, Parker underwent UCL surgery with an internal brace, ending his season.

=== Atlanta Braves ===
On November 2, 2026, Parker was claimed off of waivers by the Atlanta Braves.

== Personal life ==
Mitchell Parker secretly eloped with his high school sweetheart Hayleigh Patterson on January 23, 2024, in Las Vegas, Nevada. They later had a formal ceremony on their 1 year anniversary. Their first child, Juliette, was born on December 23, 2025.
