= Andrew Alvarez =

American baseball player (born 1999)

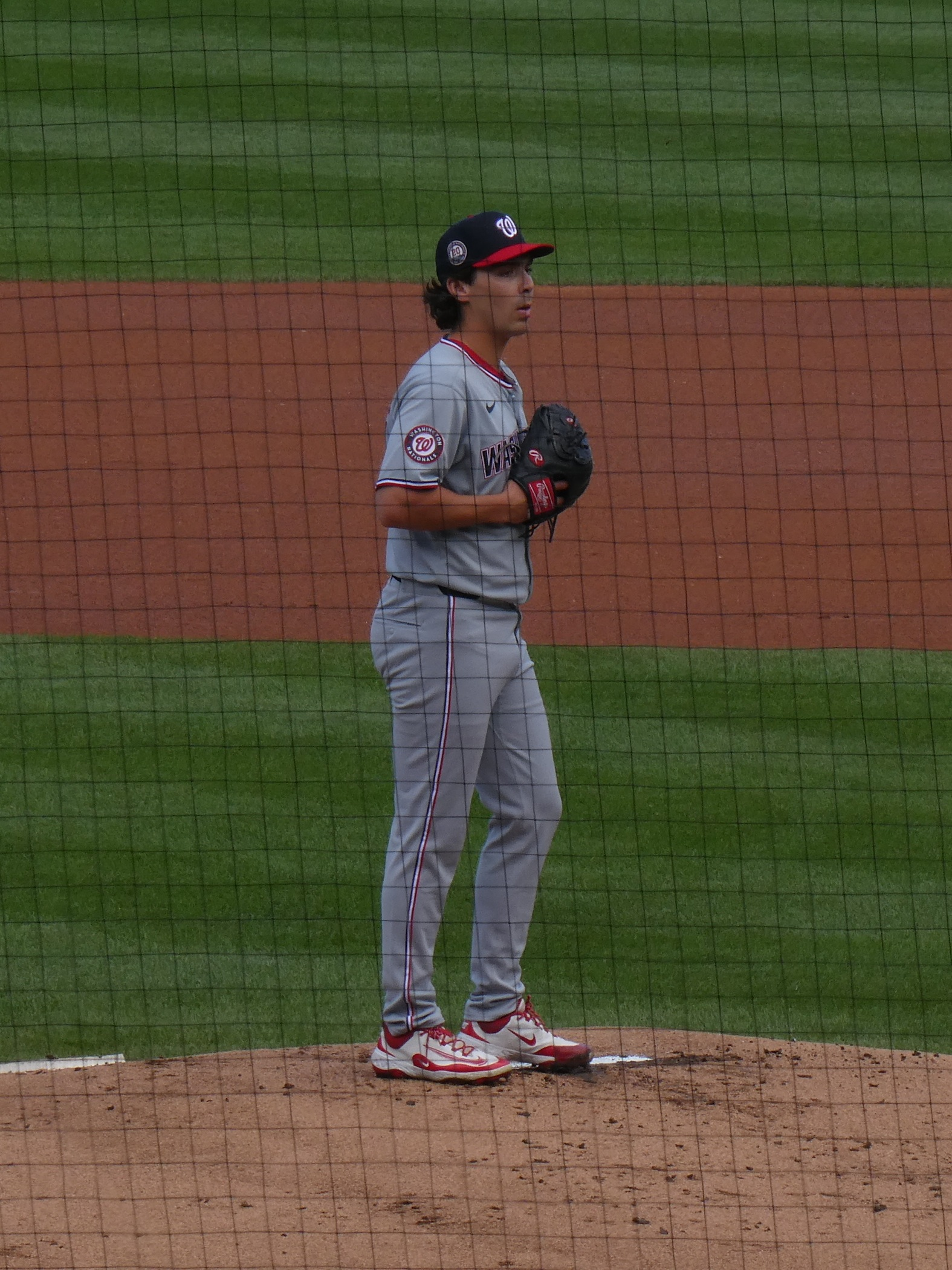
- Alvarez with the Washington Nationals in 2025

Washington Nationals – No. 54
- Pitcher
- Born: June 13, 1999 (age 27); Anaheim, California, U.S.
- Bats: Left Throws: Left

MLB debut
- September 1, 2025, for the Washington Nationals

MLB statistics (through 2026 season)
- Win–loss record: 3–7
- Earned run average: 3.24
- Strikeouts: 134
- Stats at Baseball Reference

Teams
- Washington Nationals (2025–present)

Michael Andrew Alvarez (born June 13, 1999) is an American professional baseball pitcher for the Washington Nationals of Major League Baseball (MLB). He made his MLB debut in 2025.

== Amateur career ==
Alvarez attended Los Alamitos High School in Los Alamitos, California, and California Polytechnic State University, San Luis Obispo, where he played college baseball for the Cal Poly Mustangs.

== Professional career ==
The Washington Nationals selected Alvarez in the 12th round (353rd overall) of the 2021 Major League Baseball draft. He split his first professional season between the rookie-level Florida Complex League Nationals and Single-A Fredericksburg Nationals. Alvarez split the 2022 season between Fredericksburg and the High-A Wilmington Blue Rocks, accumulating a 4–7 record and 5.00 ERA with 103 strikeouts and two saves across 84 2/3 innings pitched.

In 2023, the Nationals named Alvarez their Minor League Pitcher of the Year; in 26 appearances (22 starts) for the Double-A Harrisburg Senators and Wilmington, he posted a combined 7–7 record and 2.99 ERA with 116 strikeouts across 129 1/3 innings pitched. The Nationals named him their Minor League Pitcher of the Year. Alvarez made 26 starts split between Harrisburg and the Triple-A Rochester Red Wings in 2024, pitching to a cumulative 8–9 record and 3.90 ERA with 114 strikeouts across 131 2/3 innings pitched.

The Nationals promoted Alvarez to the major leagues on September 1, 2025. He made his MLB debut that afternoon, starting against the Miami Marlins at Nationals Park. He pitched five innings in a 2–0 Nationals victory, allowing one hit, striking out four, and walking two, becoming only the second Nationals starter in 15 years to win his major-league debut. His catcher, C. J. Stubbs, also made his major-league debut that day, making Alvarez and Stubbs the first batterymates to make their MLB debuts together since 2023, and the first Nationals pitcher and catcher to do so since 2008.

Alvarez was optioned to Triple-A Rochester to begin the 2026 season.
