= Konnor Pilkington =

American baseball player (born 1997)

Free agent
- Pitcher
- Born: September 12, 1997 (age 29); Pascagoula, Mississippi, U.S.
- Bats: Left Throws: Left

MLB debut
- April 15, 2022, for the Cleveland Guardians

MLB statistics (through 2025 season)
- Win–loss record: 3–2
- Earned run average: 3.97
- Strikeouts: 86
- Stats at Baseball Reference

Teams
- Cleveland Guardians (2022–2023); Washington Nationals (2025)

Konnor Chase Pilkington (born September 12, 1997) is an American professional baseball pitcher who is a free agent. He has previously played in Major League Baseball (MLB) for the Cleveland Guardians and Washington Nationals.

== Amateur career ==
Pilkington attended East Central High School in Hurley, Mississippi. For his high school career, he had a 25–7 win–loss record with a 1.70 earned run average (ERA), totaled 307 strikeouts, and held opponents to a batting average of .144. In June 2014, at the age of 16, he committed to Mississippi State University to play college baseball.

As a freshman at Mississippi State in 2016, Pilkington went 3–1 with a 2.08 ERA with 42 strikeouts while appearing in 14 games (11 starts). After the season, he pitched in the Cape Cod Baseball League for the Brewster Whitecaps with whom he posted a 2–1 record in 39 1/3 innings while finishing the league third overall with a 1.37 ERA and earning a spot on the CCBL 2016 Year-End All-League Team. In 2017, as a sophomore, Pilkington started a team high 17 games, going 8–5 with a 3.08 ERA and 111 strikeouts in 108 innings. He was invited to play for the USA Baseball Collegiate National Team during the summer where he pitched against Cuba, Japan and the Chinese Taipei teams while collecting a 2.65 ERA in five appearances. As a junior in 2018, Pilkington was named a Preseason All-American Second Team by Baseball America, Collegiate Baseball, NCBWA, and Perfect Game and a Third Team Preseason All-American by D1 Baseball. Pilkington was the Friday night starter for MSU. He finished the 2018 season with a 3–6 record and a 4.47 ERA in 18 starts.

== Professional career ==
=== Chicago White Sox ===
The Chicago White Sox selected Pilkington in the third round of the 2018 Major League Baseball draft and he signed with the team for a $650,000 signing bonus. He made his professional debut with the Rookie-level Arizona League White Sox and was later promoted to the Great Falls Voyagers of the Rookie Advanced Pioneer League. Over 14 innings between the two clubs, he was 0–1 with a 7.07 ERA. Pilkington began 2019 with the Kannapolis Intimidators of the Class A South Atlantic League in their starting rotation. After going 1–0 with a 1.62 ERA in six starts, Pilkington was promoted to the Winston-Salem Dash of the Class A-Advanced Carolina League with whom he finished the year. Over 19 starts with the Dash, he went 4–9 with a 4.99 ERA, striking out 96 over 95 2/3 innings. To begin the 2021 season, he was assigned to the Birmingham Barons of the Double-A South. Over 14 starts with the Barons, he went 4–4 with a 3.48 ERA and a 0.92 WHIP while striking out 71 over 62 innings.

=== Cleveland Indians / Guardians ===
On July 29, 2021, the White Sox traded Pilkington to the Cleveland Indians in exchange for César Hernández. Upon acquiring him, the Indians assigned Pilkington to the Akron RubberDucks of the Double-A Northeast. Over eight games (seven starts) with Akron, he went 3-2 with a 2.33 ERA and 49 strikeouts over 38 2/3 innings.

The newly-named Cleveland Guardians selected Pilkington to their 40-man roster on November 19, 2021. On April 2, 2022, the Guardians announced that he had been named to the Opening Day roster. On April 14, Pilkington was optioned to Triple-A without making an appearance for the big league club. He briefly became a phantom ballplayer until he was recalled to the major league roster and made his MLB debut the following day. Pilkington pitched in 15 games (starting 11) for Cleveland in 2022, registering a 1-2 record and 3.88 ERA with 50 strikeouts in 58.0 innings pitched.

He began the 2023 season with Triple-A Columbus, but struggled to an 8.36 ERA across 4 starts. Pilkington made only one appearance for Cleveland, tossing two scoreless innings of relief with two strikeouts. He was designated for assignment on April 26, 2023, following the promotion of Tanner Bibee.

=== Arizona Diamondbacks ===
On May 1, 2023, the Guardians traded Pilkington to the Arizona Diamondbacks in exchange for cash considerations. In 11 starts for the Triple–A Reno Aces, he struggled to a 9.53 ERA with 37 strikeouts in 39 2/3 innings pitched. On July 7, Pilkington was designated for assignment by Arizona following the promotion of Dominic Canzone. He cleared waivers and was sent outright to Triple–A Reno on July 13.

Pilkington spent the entirety of the 2024 campaign with Triple–A Reno. In 33 appearances (21 starts) for the Aces, he compiled a 3–5 record and 5.91 ERA with 79 strikeouts across 77 2/3 innings pitched. Pilkington elected free agency following the season on November 4, 2024.

=== Washington Nationals ===
On December 3, 2024, Pilkington signed a minor league contract with the Washington Nationals. In 36 appearances for the Triple-A Rochester Red Wings, he posted a 4-3 record and 2.59 ERA with 50 strikeouts and two saves across 41 2/3 innings pitched. On July 22, 2025, the Nationals selected Pilkington's contract, adding him to their active roster. In 32 appearances for Washington, he posted a 2-0 record and 4.45 ERA with 34 strikeouts across 28 1/3 innings pitched.

On January 28, 2026, Pilkington was designated for assignment by the Nationals following the acquisition of Tsung-Che Cheng. He elected free agency after clearing waivers on February 5.

=== Detroit Tigers ===
On February 9, 2026, Pilkington signed a minor league contract with the Detroit Tigers. He made 23 appearances for the Triple-A Toledo Mud Hens, compiling a 1-5 record and 5.40 ERA with 30 strikeouts and one save across 33 1/3 innings pitched. Pilkington was released by the Tigers organization on June 24.

=== Washington Nationals (second stint) ===
On July 2, 2026, Pilkington signed a minor league contract with the Washington Nationals. He pitched eight innings with the Triple–A Rochester Red Wings and recorded a 1.13 ERA with eight strikeouts. Pilkington was released by the Nationals on August 5.
