= Brad Lord =

American baseball player (born 2000)

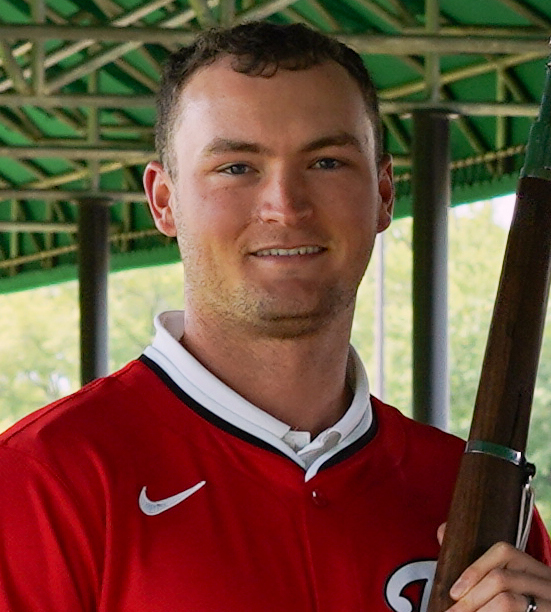
- Lord with the Washington Nationals in 2025

Washington Nationals – No. 41
- Pitcher
- Born: February 14, 2000 (age 26); Tallahassee, Florida, U.S.
- Bats: Right Throws: Right

MLB debut
- March 30, 2025, for the Washington Nationals

MLB statistics (through 2026 season)
- Win–loss record: 10–12
- Earned run average: 4.12
- Strikeouts: 185
- Stats at Baseball Reference

Teams
- Washington Nationals (2025–present)

Bradley Ryan Lord (born February 14, 2000) is an American professional baseball pitcher for the Washington Nationals of Major League Baseball (MLB). He made his MLB debut in 2025.

== Career ==
Lord attended Wakulla High School in Crawfordville, Florida and played college baseball at Santa Fe College and the University of South Florida. He was drafted by the Washington Nationals in the 18th round, with the 531st overall selection, of the 2022 Major League Baseball draft.

Lord signed with the Nationals and spent his first professional season in 2023 with the Single-A Fredericksburg Nationals and High-A Wilmington Blue Rocks. He started 2024 with Wilmington before being promoted to the Double-A Harrisburg Senators and Triple-A Rochester Red Wings.

On March 26, 2025, it was announced that Lord had made the Nationals' Opening Day roster. On May 1, Lord earned his first career win after pitching five innings and allowing two runs with four strikeouts against the Philadelphia Phillies.
