= Ildemaro Vargas =

Venezuelan baseball player (born 1991)

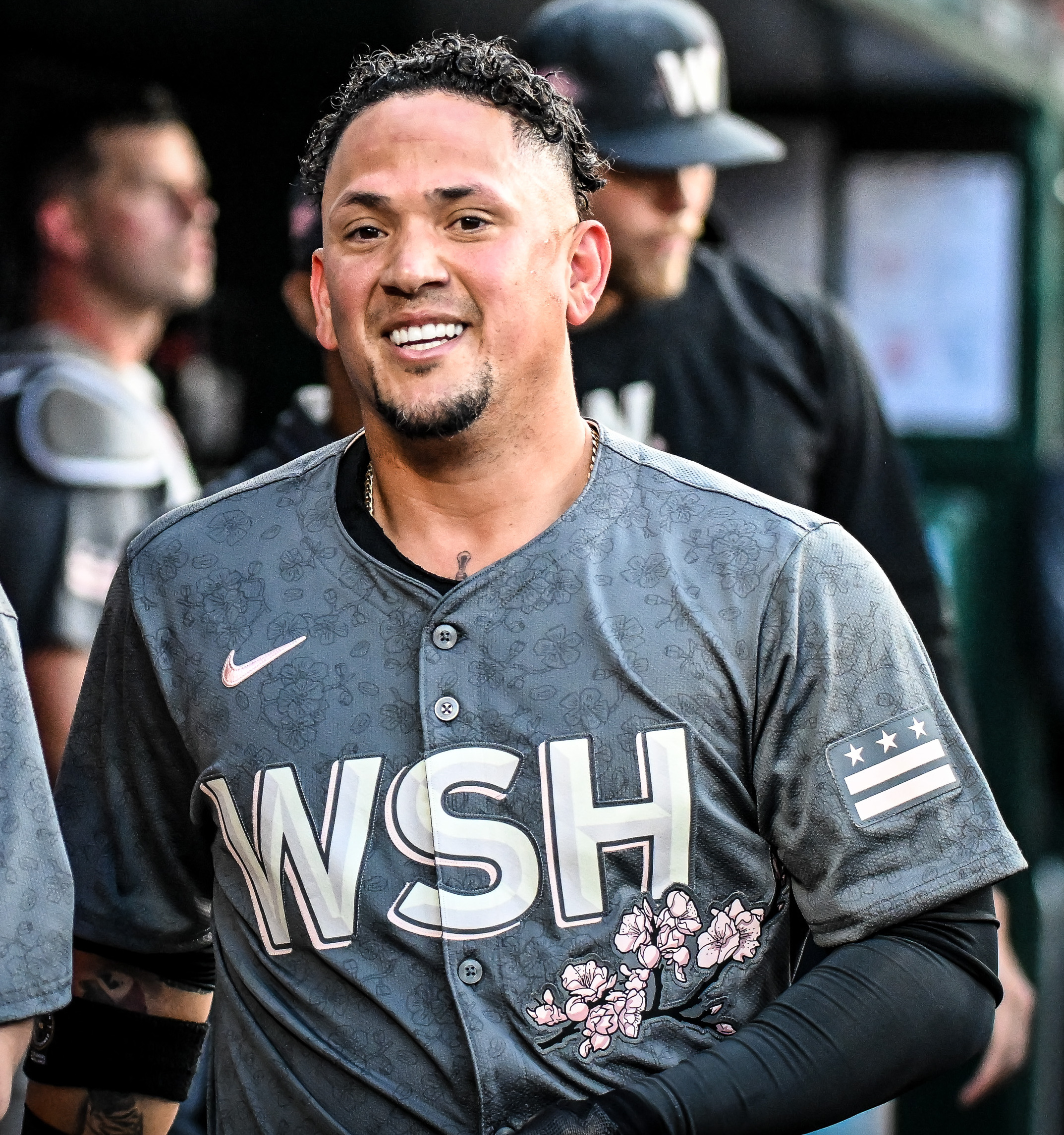
- Vargas with the Washington Nationals in 2024

Free agent
- Infielder
- Born: July 16, 1991 (age 35); Caripito, Monagas, Venezuela
- Bats: Switch Throws: Right

MLB debut
- June 29, 2017, for the Arizona Diamondbacks

MLB statistics (through 2026 season)
- Batting average: .250
- Home runs: 29
- Runs batted in: 212
- Stats at Baseball Reference

Teams
- Arizona Diamondbacks (2017–2020); Minnesota Twins (2020); Chicago Cubs (2020–2021); Pittsburgh Pirates (2021); Arizona Diamondbacks (2021); Chicago Cubs (2022); Washington Nationals (2022–2024); Arizona Diamondbacks (2025–2026)

Ildemaro José Vargas Barreto (born July 16, 1991) is a Venezuelan professional baseball infielder who is a free agent. He has played in Major League Baseball (MLB) for the Minnesota Twins, Chicago Cubs, Pittsburgh Pirates, Arizona Diamondbacks and Washington Nationals.

== Career ==
=== St. Louis Cardinals ===
Vargas signed with the St. Louis Cardinals as an international free agent on June 24, 2008. He made his professional debut with the VSL Cardinals. He played for the club in 2009 as well, slashing .264/.368/.374 in 52 games. In 2010, Vargas played for the GCL Cardinals, batting .239/.317/.364 with no home runs and 15 RBI. He also played for the club in 2011, hitting .289/.391/.395 with 1 home run and 18 RBI. In 2012, he split the year between the rookie ball Johnson City Cardinals, the Low-A Batavia Muckdogs, and the High-A Palm Beach Cardinals, posting a .314/.378/.443 batting line with 4 home runs and 32 RBI between the three clubs. He spent the 2013 season with the Single-A Peoria Chiefs, slashing .248/.304/.305 in 115 games. He split the 2014 season between Palm Beach and the Double-A Springfield Cardinals, batting .236/.266/.286 with 1 home run and 40 RBI. On March 30, 2015, Vargas was released by the Cardinals organization.

=== Bridgeport Bluefish ===
On April 1, 2015, Vargas signed with Bridgeport Bluefish of the Atlantic League of Professional Baseball. In 30 games for the club, he slashed .273/.316/.318 with 8 RBI.

=== Arizona Diamondbacks ===
On May 26, 2015, Vargas signed a minor league contract with the Arizona Diamondbacks. He spent the remainder of the year with the Single-A Kane County Cougars, slashing .321/.385/.438 in 86 games. In 2016, Vargas split the year between the High-A Visalia Rawhide, the Double-A Mobile BayBears, and the Triple-A Reno Aces, posting a batting line of .305/.360/.400 with 6 home runs and 37 RBI between the three teams. The Diamondbacks added Vargas to their 40-man roster after the 2016 season.

Vargas started 2017 with the Reno Aces and was called up to the Diamondbacks on June 29. He hit .308 in 13 major league plate appearances in 2017 and .211 in 20 major league plate appearances in 2018. In 2019, Vargas hit .269/.299/.413 in 92 games for the big league club, notching 6 home runs and 24 RBI. On September 24, 2019, Vargas was brought in to pinch-hit in the ninth inning of a game against the St. Louis Cardinals and hit a home run that tied the game at 1–1. The game would go on for 19 innings, the longest game in Diamondbacks history, and ended when Vargas hit a walk-off single. Vargas went 3-for-20 in 8 games for Arizona in 2020 before he was designated for assignment on August 6, 2020.

=== Minnesota Twins ===
On August 11, 2020, Vargas was traded to the Minnesota Twins in exchange for cash considerations. He was designated for assignment on September 2.

=== Chicago Cubs ===
On September 5, 2020, Vargas was claimed off waivers by the Chicago Cubs. He joined the team's active roster on September 7. On September 12, in a game against the Milwaukee Brewers, he hit a home run off of closer Josh Hader. In 6 games for Chicago, Vargas went 2-for-9. On March 28, 2021, Vargas was designated for assignment by the Cubs. On March 31, Vargas was outrighted to the minors.

On April 13, 2021, Vargas was selected to the active roster after Matt Duffy was placed on the COVID-19 injured list. Vargas was removed from the 40-man roster on April 16, but was re-selected on May 4. After hitting .143 in 24 plate appearances, Vargas was designated for assignment on May 15, 2021.

=== Pittsburgh Pirates ===
On May 17, 2021, Vargas was claimed off waivers by the Pittsburgh Pirates. Vargas hit .077 in 7 games before being designated for assignment on May 30.

=== Arizona Diamondbacks (second stint) ===
On June 2, 2021, Vargas was traded to the Arizona Diamondbacks in exchange for cash considerations. Vargas immediately joined the active roster, his third team of the season, taking the place of infielder Domingo Leyba, who was designated for assignment. After going 3–for–17 in 9 games, Vargas was designated for assignment on June 19. He cleared waivers and was sent outright to the Triple–A Reno Aces on June 22. On September 19, Vargas's contract was selected by Arizona. Vargas hit .156 in 34 games in 2021, with no home runs and 7 RBI. On October 8, Vargas elected free agency.

=== Chicago Cubs (second stint) ===
On December 17, 2021, Vargas signed a minor league contract to return to the Chicago Cubs. He had his contract selected to the majors on May 10, 2022. He was designated for assignment on May 22, and elected free agency on May 26.

=== Washington Nationals ===
On May 27, 2022, Vargas signed a minor league contract with the Washington Nationals. On August 2, the Nationals selected Vargas' contract, adding him to their active roster. In 53 games for the Nationals, he batted .280/.308/.398 with three home runs, 19 RBI, and three stolen bases.

Vargas made 89 appearances for the Nationals in 2023, slashing .252/.304/.363 with four home runs and 31 RBI.

Vargas played in 95 games for Washington in 2024, slashing .246/.295/.316 with one home run, 30 RBI, and nine stolen bases. On November 4, 2024, Vargas was removed from the 40–man roster and sent outright to the Triple–A Rochester Red Wings, but he rejected the assignment and elected free agency.

=== Arizona Diamondbacks (third stint) ===
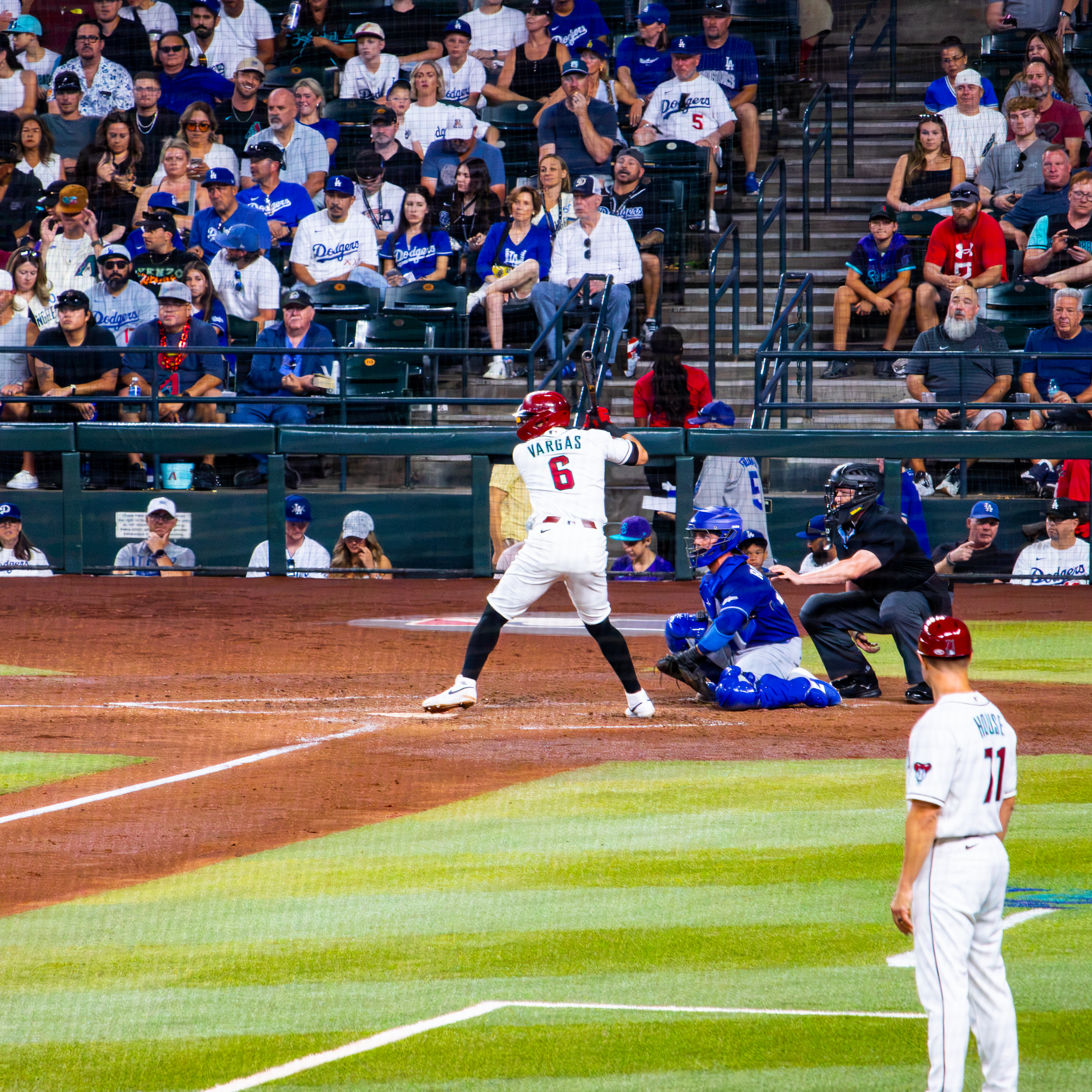
Vargas batting at Chase Field in 2026

On December 17, 2024, Vargas signed a minor league contract with the Arizona Diamondbacks. He made 49 appearances for the Triple-A Reno Aces, hitting .261/.330/.397 with five home runs, 35 RBI, and four stolen bases. On May 27, 2025, Vargas opted out of his contract and was granted his release by the Diamondbacks. On May 29, he was signed to a major league contract by the team. In 38 appearances for Arizona, Vargas batted .270/.292/.383 with three home runs and 19 RBI.

On December 19, 2025, Vargas re-signed with the Diamondbacks on a minor league contract. On March 25, 2026, the Diamondbacks selected Vargas' contract after he made the team's Opening Day roster. On April 22, Vargas went 2–for–5 with two home runs and five RBI as part of an 11–7 victory over the Chicago White Sox. After beginning the year with a hit in 24 straight games (a total of 27 games including the 2025 season), he was awarded with NL player of the week for the first time, as well as NL Player of the Month for April.

== Personal life ==
Vargas has a son.

Awards
Preceded by Daylen Lile	National League Player of the Month; April 2026	Succeeded by JJ Bleday
