= C. J. Stubbs =

American baseball player (born 1996)

Free agent
- Catcher
- Born: November 12, 1996 (age 29); San Diego, California, U.S.
- Bats: Right Throws: Right

MLB debut
- September 1, 2025, for the Washington Nationals

MLB statistics (through 2025 season)
- Batting average: .000
- Home runs: 0
- Runs batted in: 0
- Stats at Baseball Reference

Teams
- Washington Nationals (2025)

Cameron J. Stubbs (born November 12, 1996) is an American professional baseball catcher who is a free agent. He has previously played in Major League Baseball (MLB) for the Washington Nationals, making his major league debut in 2025. He has also played for Team Israel in the World Baseball Classic.

== Early life ==
Stubbs was born to parents T. Pat and Marti, and grew up in San Diego and Del Mar, California. C. J.'s older brother, Garrett Stubbs, is a catcher on the Philadelphia Phillies. C. J. is Jewish.

He played for the Torrey Pines High School baseball team for two years, graduating in 2015. In his high school career, Stubbs batted .323 with a .432 on base percentage, and 29 walks against 20 strikeouts in 195 at bats. On defense at catcher, he caught 53% of attempted basestealers. As a pitcher, he had an 8–4 win–loss record with a 1.42 earned run average in 84 innings pitched across 14 games. He was named the 2015 Palomar League Pitcher of the Year. He was also a two-time All-California Interscholastic Federation San Diego Academic team selection, was named All-North County and All-League in his junior and senior seasons, and was named All-San Diego County in his senior season.

== College career ==
Stubbs played college baseball for the USC Trojans baseball team, both as a catcher and as a pitcher. In 201 at bats he hit .274/.370/.448. As a pitcher, he was 3–6 with a 4.44 ERA in 99 1/3 innings, and was 4th in the 2016 Pac-12 with 1.71 walks/9 innings. He pitched in 26 games (18 as a starter), and also appeared at catcher (50 games), in left field (8), and in right field (1). He majored in business administration, and graduated from the USC Marshall School of Business in 2019.

== Professional career ==
=== Houston Astros ===
Stubbs was drafted as a catcher by the Houston Astros in the 10th round (316th overall) of the 2019 Major League Baseball draft, and signed with the team on June 12, 2019. In 2019 he played for the Low-A Tri-City ValleyCats in the New York-Pennsylvania League, batting .213/.327/.386; he also played for the Single-A Quad Cities River Bandits in the Midwest League, batting .328/.371/.621, playing catcher, first base, and corner outfield for the two affiliates. Stubbs did not play in a game in 2020 due to the cancellation of the minor league season because of the COVID-19 pandemic.

Stubbs returned to action in 2021 with the Asheville Tourists of the High-A East and the Corpus Christi Hooks of the Double-A Central, batting a combined .220/.297/.398, playing primarily catcher and first base. In 2022, he again played for Asheville and Corpus Christi, batting a combined .214/.335/.487 in 271 at-bats with 21 home runs and 14 stolen bases in 16 attempts, playing primarily catcher and first base.

Stubbs spent the majority of the 2023 season with Corpus Christi, also appearing in one game for the Triple-A Sugar Land Space Cowboys; in 95 appearances for the Hooks, he batted .196/.314/.380 with 14 home runs, 33 RBI, and 15 stolen bases. He began the 2024 season with Corpus Christi and Sugar Land, but experienced offensive struggles with both affiliates. Stubbs was released by the Astros organization on May 7, 2024.

=== Washington Nationals ===
On May 14, 2024, Stubbs signed a minor league contract with the Washington Nationals organization. He spent the remainder of the season with the Double-A Harrisburg Senators in the Eastern League, batting .207/.327/.368, and for the Triple-A Rochester Red Wings in the International League, batting .273/.500/.545. Stubbs played 42 games at catcher (throwing out 39% of attempted basestealers) and 12 games at first base between the two teams. He elected free agency following the season on November 4, but re-signed with Washington on a new minor league contract on November 28.

During the 2025 season, Stubbs played for Harrisburg and Rochester again, and between the two affiliates he was batting a combined .148/.279/.240, and had played 53 games at catcher (throwing out 37% of attempted base stealers; second-best in the Nationals organization), seven games as a designated hitter, and three games at first base when the Nationals called him up to the major leagues on August 29, 2025.

Stubbs made his MLB debut on the afternoon of September 1, 2025, starting against the Miami Marlins at Nationals Park in Washington, D.C. Nationals starting pitcher Andrew Alvarez also made his major league debut that day, making Stubbs and Alvarez the first battery-mates to make their MLB debuts together since 2023, and the first Nationals catcher and pitcher to do so since 2008. Known for his strong defense, Stubbs caught a shutout, becoming the first Nationals catcher to catch a shutout in his major league debut, and the first major league catcher since Sean Murphy of the Oakland A's in 2019 to catch a shutout in his MLB debut. The Nationals optioned Stubbs to Rochester the next day, following the signing of Jorge Alfaro. On October 29, Stubbs was removed from the 40-man roster and sent outright to Rochester. He elected free agency on November 6.

=== Toronto Blue Jays ===
On January 20, 2026, Stubbs signed a minor league contract with the Toronto Blue Jays. In 60 games across 4 levels of the minors he batted .220/.312/.393 with 10 home runs, 26 RBIs and 2 stolen bases. He elected free agency on November 2.

== International career ==
Stubbs played for Team Israel in the 2023 World Baseball Classic. He played again for Team Israel alongside his brother Garrett Stubbs in the 2026 World Baseball Classic.

== See also ==
- List of Jewish Major League Baseball players
- List of Jews in Sports
