= Kyle Finnegan =

American baseball player (born 1991)

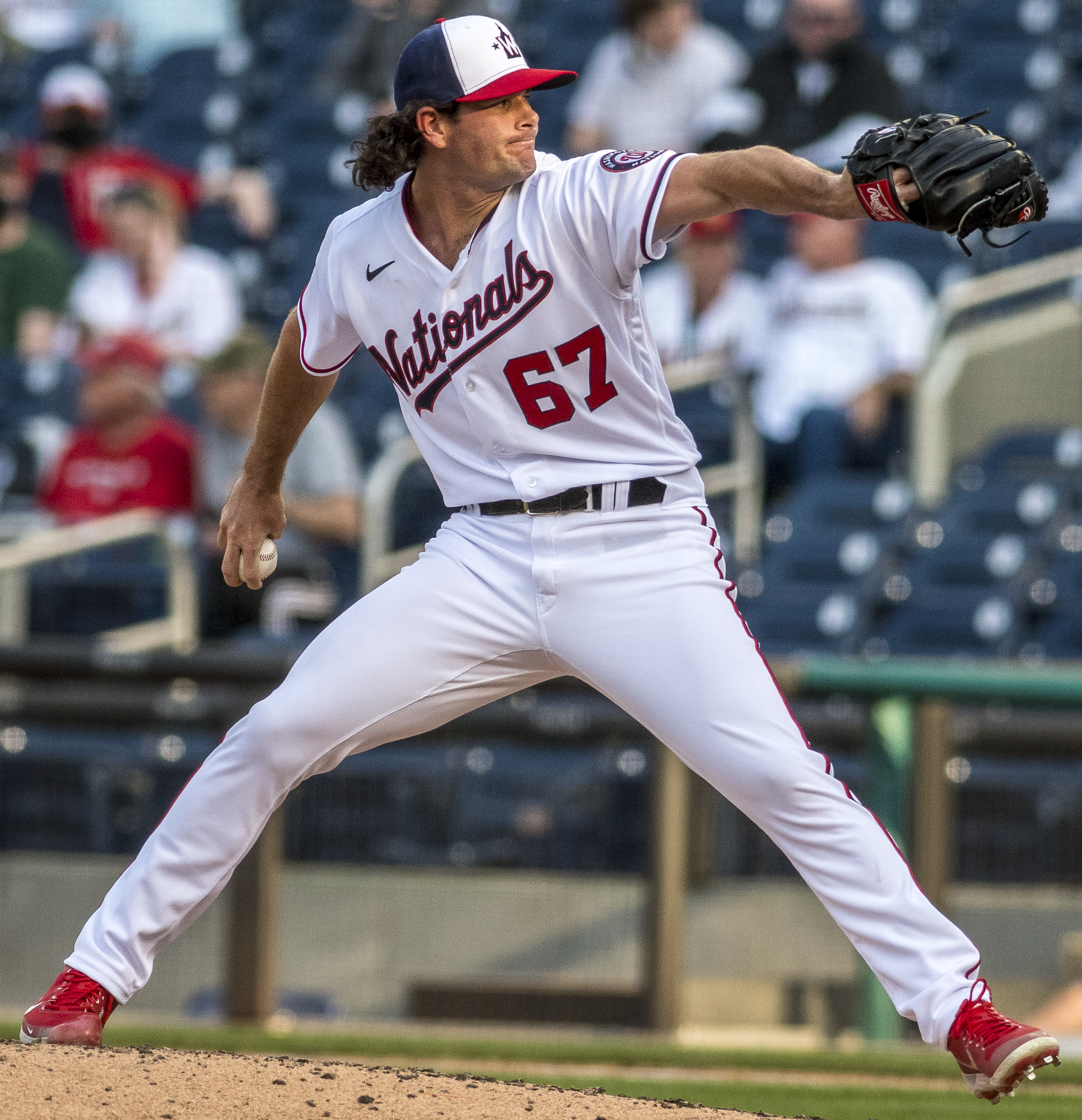
- Finnegan with the Washington Nationals in 2021

Detroit Tigers – No. 67
- Pitcher
- Born: September 4, 1991 (age 35); Detroit, Michigan, U.S.
- Bats: Right Throws: Right

MLB debut
- July 25, 2020, for the Washington Nationals

MLB statistics (through September 15, 2026)
- Win–loss record: 29–31
- Earned run average: 3.66
- Strikeouts: 390
- Saves: 114
- Stats at Baseball Reference

Teams
- Washington Nationals (2020–2025); Detroit Tigers (2025–present)

Career highlights and awards
- All-Star (2024)

Kyle Edward Finnegan (born September 4, 1991) is an American professional baseball pitcher for the Detroit Tigers of Major League Baseball (MLB). He has previously played in MLB for the Washington Nationals.

== Amateur career ==
Finnegan attended Kingwood High School in Kingwood, Texas. He earned all-district first team honors while helping his team to a 27–7 mark as a senior and a district championship. Finnegan also played in the HABCA All-Star Game. Finnegan enrolled at Texas State University. As a freshman, he had a 1–0 win–loss record, a 6.97 earned run average (ERA), struck out four batters in 10 1/3 innings of work. He earned the victory in his lone start of the season against Prairie View A&M and pitched three scoreless innings of relief against McNeese State.

In his sophomore year, Finnegan appeared in 15 games, starting 14. He threw a career-high 8 innings twice, against UT Arlington and Texas A&M-Corpus Christi. He finished the year with a 3.28 ERA in 93 1/3 innings, limited opponents to just a .242 average, struck out 75 batters while walking just 26. He began the season 4–0, with wins in each of his first four starts. Finnegan fanned a season-high 12 opponents in 7 innings without allowing a run against Notre Dame. He allowed just two earned runs in 27 innings over his first four starts to begin the year. He threw a scoreless inning in his only relief appearance of the year, as part of an 8–4 win against TCU and struck out eight without walking any in 7 1/3 innings against Sam Houston State. Following his sophomore season at Texas State, Finnegan played in the Cape Cod Baseball League for the Cotuit Kettleers, helping them to a regular season championship.

== Professional career ==
=== Oakland Athletics ===
The Oakland Athletics selected Finnegan in the sixth round (191st overall) of the 2013 MLB draft. Pitching for the Vermont Lake Monsters of the Low–A New York–Penn League, he had a 3–3 record and a 2.70 earned run average in 2013. Also in the same year, pitching for the Single–A Beloit Snappers of the Midwest League, he had a 1–1 record and a 9.82 ERA. In 2014, pitching for Beloit, he had 7–9 record and a 3.69 earned run average and 55 strikeouts. Finnegan was later named the starting pitcher for the west team in the 2014 Midwest League All-Star Game, where he earned the win tossing one shutout inning. Receiving a promotion to the Midland RockHounds of the Double-A Texas League, he had a 0–1 record with an 11.81 earned run average. He spent the 2015 season with the Stockton Ports, going 9–9 with a 5. 44 ERA over 127 innings.

Finnegan split the 2016 season between Stockton and Midland, going a combined 2–3 with a 2.54 ERA over 63 2/3 innings. He split the 2017 season between Midland and the Nashville Sounds, going a combined 2–4 with a 3.88 ERA over 59 innings. Finnegan split the 2018 season between the rookie–level Arizona League Athletics, Midland, and Nashville, going 1–3 with a 4.84 ERA over 44 2/3 innings. He split the 2019 season between Midland and the Las Vegas Aviators, going a combined 3–2 with a 2.31 ERA over 50 2/3 innings, and was named a 2019 Texas League All-Star. Finnegan elected free agency following the season on November 4, 2019.

=== Washington Nationals ===
On December 8, 2019, Finnegan signed a major league contract with the Washington Nationals. He made his major league debut on July 25, 2020, against the New York Yankees, allowing one hit and no runs in one inning of relief. Finnegan finished his rookie year with an ERA of 2.92 and 27 strikeouts in 25 appearances for the big league club.

On May 5, 2021, in a game against the Atlanta Braves, Finnegan pitched the fifth immaculate inning in Nationals history, striking out Austin Riley, Dansby Swanson, and William Contreras on nine pitches. After the Nationals traded Daniel Hudson and Brad Hand at the 2021 trade deadline, the Nationals named Finnegan their closer. He finished the season with a 3.55 ERA, 68 strikeouts and 34 walks in 66 innings.

On January 13, 2023, Finnegan agreed to a one-year, $2.3 million contract with the Nationals, avoiding salary arbitration. He finished the 2023 season with a 3.76 ERA and 28 saves. During a game between the Colorado Rockies on June 22, 2024, he became the first pitcher in MLB history to lose a regular-season game due to a pitch clock violation.

On July 15, 2024, Finnegan was added to the National League All-Star team as a replacement to the injured Ryan Helsley. He was one of two All-Stars from the Nationals this year, the other being CJ Abrams. Across 65 games for Washington in 2024, Finnegan posted a 3.68 ERA with 60 strikeouts and a career-high 38 saves. However, he pitched much worse in the second half of the season, with an ERA of 5.79, compared to 2.45 in the first half of 2024. On November 22, Finnegan was non-tendered by the Nationals and became a free agent.

On February 25, 2025, Finnegan re-signed with the Nationals on a one-year, $6 million contract. He made 40 appearances for Washington to begin the year, logging a 1-4 record and 4.38 ERA with 32 strikeouts and 20 saves over 39 innings of work.

=== Detroit Tigers ===
On July 31, 2025, the Nationals traded Finnegan to the Detroit Tigers in exchange for pitchers Josh Randall and R. J. Sales. Finnegan made 16 appearances for the Tigers, posting a 1.50 ERA with four saves and 23 strikeouts in 18 innings.

On December 20, 2025, Finnegan re-signed with the Tigers on a two-year, $19 million contract.

== Personal life ==
Finnegan and his now-wife Rachel got engaged in January 2019. They have three children: Brayden, Carsen, and Cooper. Carsen and Cooper are twins, born on August 31, 2021.
