= Orlando Ribalta =

Cuban baseball player (born 1998)

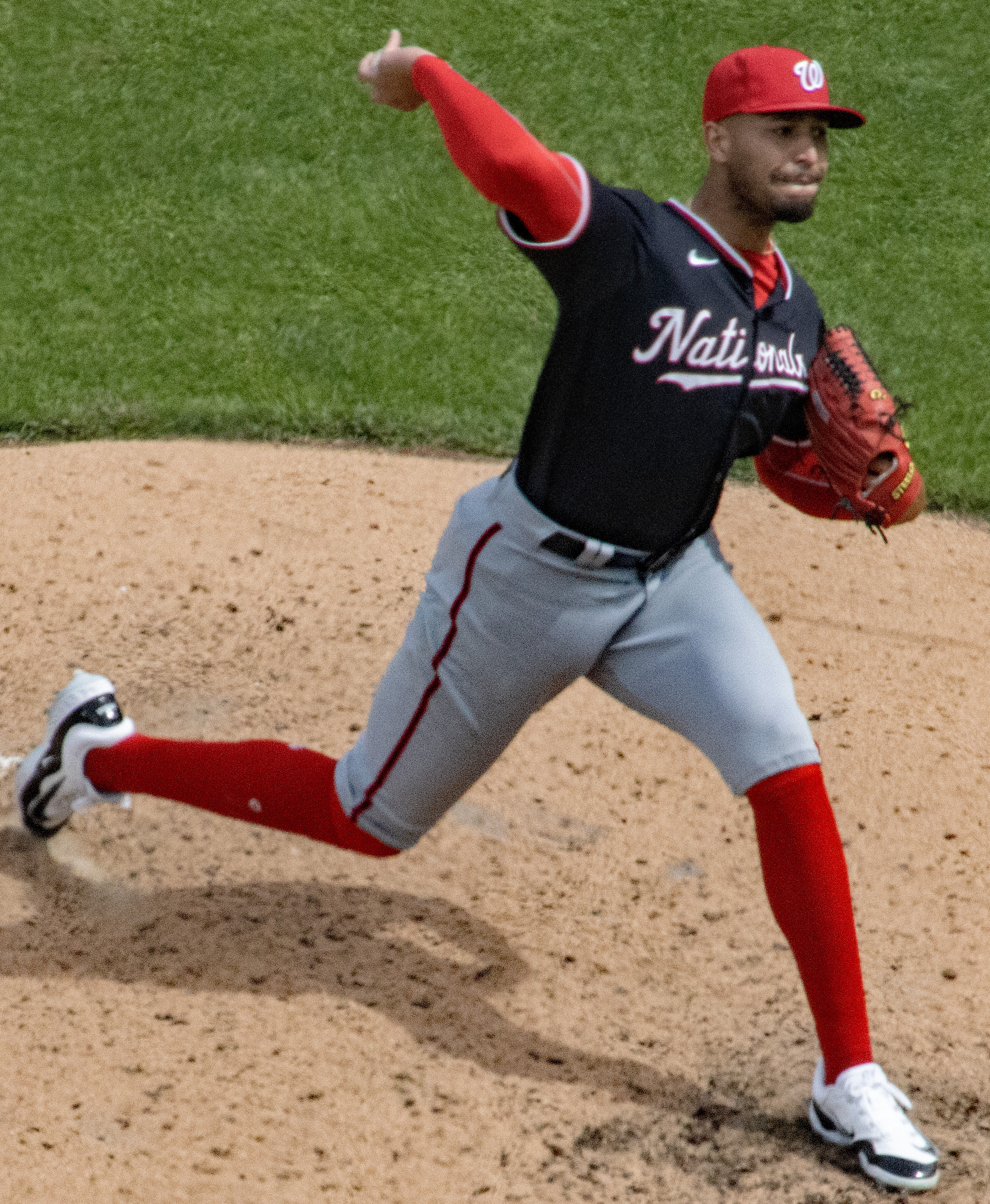
- Ribalta with the Washington Nationals in 2024

Washington Nationals – No. 64
- Pitcher
- Born: March 5, 1998 (age 28); Santa Clara, Cuba
- Bats: Right Throws: Right

MLB debut
- August 13, 2024, for the Washington Nationals

MLB statistics (through 2026 season)
- Win–loss record: 1–2
- Earned run average: 5.35
- Strikeouts: 70
- Stats at Baseball Reference

Teams
- Washington Nationals (2024–present)

Orlando Andres Ribalta (born March 5, 1998) is a Cuban professional baseball pitcher for the Washington Nationals of Major League Baseball (MLB).

== Career ==
Ribalta was drafted in the 12th round, with the 363rd overall selection, of the 2019 Major League Baseball draft. He made his professional debut with the rookie–level Gulf Coast League Nationals. Ribalta did not play in a game in 2020 due to the cancellation of the minor league season because of the COVID-19 pandemic.

Ribalta returned to action in 2021 with the rookie–level Florida Complex League Nationals, posting a 4.24 ERA with 17 strikeouts and 2 saves over 17 innings pitched. He split the 2022 season between the Single–A Fredericksburg Nationals and High–A Wilmington Blue Rocks, recording a cumulative 3.40 ERA with 54 strikeouts and 2 saves across 50 1/3 innings of work.

Ribalta split the 2023 campaign between the FCL Nationals, Fredericksburg, Wilmington, the Double–A Harrisburg Senators, and Triple–A Rochester Red Wings. In 27 games split between the five affiliates, he accumulated a 4–1 record and 3.89 ERA with 36 strikeouts and 2 saves across 34 2/3 innings pitched. Ribalta began the 2024 season with Harrisburg, logging a 1.00 ERA in 16 games before he was promoted to Rochester. In 25 appearances out of the bullpen for Rochester, he compiled a 4–1 record and 3.62 ERA with 35 strikeouts across 27 1/3 innings pitched.

On August 13, 2024, Ribalta was selected to the 40-man roster and promoted to the major leagues for the first time. He made four appearances for the Nationals during his rookie campaign, recording a 13.50 ERA with three strikeouts across 3 1/3 innings pitched. Ribalta made 22 relief appearances for Washington in 2025, pitching to a 7.03 ERA with 25 strikeouts across 24 1/3 innings pitched.

Ribalta was optioned to Triple-A Rochester to begin the 2026 season. On August 29, 2026, he recorded his first major league win, pitching the 10th inning for the Nationals in a 5–4 win over the Miami Marlins, giving up one hit, no runs and striking out two.
