= List of Colorado Rockies minor league affiliates =

Current Colorado Rockies domestic minor league affiliate locations

The Colorado Rockies farm system consists of seven Minor League Baseball affiliates across the United States and in the Dominican Republic. Four teams are independently owned, while three—the Arizona Complex League Rockies and a pair of Dominican Summer League Rockies squads—are owned by the major league club.

The Rockies have been affiliated with the Triple-A Albuquerque Isotopes of the Pacific Coast League since 2015, making it the longest-running active affiliation in the organization among teams not owned by the Rockies. The longest affiliation in the team's history was the 27-year relationship with the Class A Asheville Tourists of the South Atlantic League from 1994 to 2020. Their newest affiliations began in 2021 with the Single-A Fresno Grizzlies of the California League and the High-A Spokane Indians of the Northwest League.

Geographically, Colorado's closest domestic affiliate is the Albuquerque Isotopes, which are approximately 350 miles (560 km) away. Colorado's furthest domestic affiliate is the Double-A Hartford Yard Goats of the Eastern League some 1,687 miles (2,715 km) away.

== Current affiliates ==
The Colorado Rockies farm system consists of seven minor league affiliates.

Class	Team	League	Location	Ballpark	Affiliated
Triple-A	Albuquerque Isotopes	Pacific Coast League	Albuquerque, New Mexico	Rio Grande Credit Union Field at Isotopes Park	2015
Double-A	Hartford Yard Goats	Eastern League	Hartford, Connecticut	Dunkin' Park	2015
High-A	Spokane Indians	Northwest League	Spokane Valley, Washington	Avista Stadium	2021
Single-A	Fresno Grizzlies	California League	Fresno, California	Chukchansi Park	2021
Rookie	ACL Rockies	Arizona Complex League	Scottsdale, Arizona	Salt River Fields at Talking Stick	2021
Rookie	DSL Colorado	Dominican Summer League	Boca Chica, Santo Domingo	Colorado Rockies Complex	2018
Rookie	DSL Rockies	Dominican Summer League	Boca Chica, Santo Domingo	Colorado Rockies Complex	1997

== Past affiliates ==
=== Key ===
Season	Each year is linked to an article about that particular Rockies season.

=== 1990–2020 ===
Minor League Baseball operated with six classes (Triple-A, Double-A, Class A-Advanced, Class A, Class A Short Season, and Rookie) from 1990 to 2020. The Rookie level consisted of domestic and foreign circuits.

Season	Triple-A	Double-A	Class A-Advanced	Class A	Class A Short Season	Rookie	Foreign Rookie	Ref(s).
1992	—	—	—	—	Bend Rockies	AZL Rockies/Cubs	DSL Rockies/Royals/Cubs	
1993	Colorado Springs Sky Sox	—	Central Valley Rockies	—	Bend Rockies	AZL Rockies	DSL Rockies/Royals	
1994	Colorado Springs Sky Sox	New Haven Ravens	Central Valley Rockies	Asheville Tourists	Bend Rockies	AZL Rockies	DSL Rockies/Royals	
1995	Colorado Springs Sky Sox	New Haven Ravens	Salem Avalanche	Asheville Tourists	Portland Rockies	AZL Rockies	DSL Rockies/Royals	
1996	Colorado Springs Sky Sox	New Haven Ravens	Salem Avalanche	Asheville Tourists	Portland Rockies	AZL Rockies	DSL Rockies/Royals	
1997	Colorado Springs Sky Sox	New Haven Ravens	Salem Avalanche	Asheville Tourists	Portland Rockies	AZL Rockies	DSL Rockies	
1998	Colorado Springs Sky Sox	New Haven Ravens	Salem Avalanche	Asheville Tourists	Portland Rockies	AZL Rockies	DSL Rockies	
1999	Colorado Springs Sky Sox	Carolina Mudcats	Salem Avalanche	Asheville Tourists	Portland Rockies	AZL Rockies	DSL Rockies	
2000	Colorado Springs Sky Sox	Carolina Mudcats	Salem Avalanche	Asheville Tourists	Portland Rockies	AZL Rockies	DSL Rockies	
2001	Colorado Springs Sky Sox	Carolina Mudcats	Salem Avalanche	Asheville Tourists	Tri-City Dust Devils	Casper Rockies	DSL Rockies	
2002	Colorado Springs Sky Sox	Carolina Mudcats	Salem Avalanche	Asheville Tourists	Tri-City Dust Devils	Casper Rockies	DSL Rockies; VSL Puerto Cabello (Note: In 2002, the Rockies operated a Venezuelan Summer League team as a co-op with the Chicago Cubs.)	
2003	Colorado Springs Sky Sox	Tulsa Drillers	Visalia Oaks	Asheville Tourists	Tri-City Dust Devils	Casper Rockies	DSL Rockies	
2004	Colorado Springs Sky Sox	Tulsa Drillers	Visalia Oaks	Asheville Tourists	Tri-City Dust Devils	Casper Rockies	DSL Rockies	
2005	Colorado Springs Sky Sox	Tulsa Drillers	Modesto Nuts	Asheville Tourists	Tri-City Dust Devils	Casper Rockies	DSL Rockies	
2006	Colorado Springs Sky Sox	Tulsa Drillers	Modesto Nuts	Asheville Tourists	Tri-City Dust Devils	Casper Rockies	DSL Rockies	
2007	Colorado Springs Sky Sox	Tulsa Drillers	Modesto Nuts	Asheville Tourists	Tri-City Dust Devils	Casper Rockies	DSL Rockies	
2008	Colorado Springs Sky Sox	Tulsa Drillers	Modesto Nuts	Asheville Tourists	Tri-City Dust Devils	Casper Ghosts	DSL Rockies	
2009	Colorado Springs Sky Sox	Tulsa Drillers	Modesto Nuts	Asheville Tourists	Tri-City Dust Devils	Casper Ghosts	DSL Rockies	
2010	Colorado Springs Sky Sox	Tulsa Drillers	Modesto Nuts	Asheville Tourists	Tri-City Dust Devils	Casper Ghosts	DSL Rockies	
2011	Colorado Springs Sky Sox	Tulsa Drillers	Modesto Nuts	Asheville Tourists	Tri-City Dust Devils	Casper Ghosts	DSL Rockies	
2012	Colorado Springs Sky Sox	Tulsa Drillers	Modesto Nuts	Asheville Tourists	Tri-City Dust Devils	Grand Junction Rockies	DSL Rockies	
2013	Colorado Springs Sky Sox	Tulsa Drillers	Modesto Nuts	Asheville Tourists	Tri-City Dust Devils	Grand Junction Rockies	DSL Rockies	
2014	Colorado Springs Sky Sox	Tulsa Drillers	Modesto Nuts	Asheville Tourists	Tri-City Dust Devils	Grand Junction Rockies	DSL Rockies	
2015	Albuquerque Isotopes	New Britain Rock Cats	Modesto Nuts	Asheville Tourists	Boise Hawks	Grand Junction Rockies	DSL Rockies	
2016	Albuquerque Isotopes	Hartford Yard Goats	Modesto Nuts	Asheville Tourists	Boise Hawks	Grand Junction Rockies	DSL Rockies	
2017	Albuquerque Isotopes	Hartford Yard Goats	Lancaster JetHawks	Asheville Tourists	Boise Hawks	Grand Junction Rockies	DSL Rockies	
2018	Albuquerque Isotopes	Hartford Yard Goats	Lancaster JetHawks	Asheville Tourists	Boise Hawks	Grand Junction Rockies	DSL Colorado; DSL Rockies	
2019	Albuquerque Isotopes	Hartford Yard Goats	Lancaster JetHawks	Asheville Tourists	Boise Hawks	Grand Junction Rockies	DSL Colorado; DSL Rockies	
2020 (Note: The 2020 Minor League Baseball season was cancelled due to the COVID-19 pandemic.)	Albuquerque Isotopes	Hartford Yard Goats	Lancaster JetHawks	Asheville Tourists	Boise Hawks	Grand Junction Rockies	DSL Colorado; DSL Rockies	

=== 2021–present ===
The current structure of Minor League Baseball is the result of an overall contraction of the system beginning with the 2021 season. Class A was reduced to two levels: High-A and Low-A. Low-A was reclassified as Single-A in 2022.

Season	Triple-A	Double-A	High-A	Single-A	Rookie	Foreign Rookie	Ref.
2021	Albuquerque Isotopes	Hartford Yard Goats	Spokane Indians	Fresno Grizzlies	ACL Rockies	DSL Colorado; DSL Rockies	
2022	Albuquerque Isotopes	Hartford Yard Goats	Spokane Indians	Fresno Grizzlies	ACL Rockies	DSL Colorado; DSL Rockies	
2023	Albuquerque Isotopes	Hartford Yard Goats	Spokane Indians	Fresno Grizzlies	ACL Rockies	DSL Colorado; DSL Rockies	
2024	Albuquerque Isotopes	Hartford Yard Goats	Spokane Indians	Fresno Grizzlies	ACL Rockies	DSL Colorado; DSL Rockies	
2025	Albuquerque Isotopes	Hartford Yard Goats	Spokane Indians	Fresno Grizzlies	ACL Rockies	DSL Colorado; DSL Rockies	
2026	Albuquerque Isotopes	Hartford Yard Goats	Spokane Indians	Fresno Grizzlies	ACL Rockies	DSL Colorado; DSL Rockies	
