= Juan Mejía (baseball) =

Dominican baseball player (born 2000)

Colorado Rockies – No. 47
- Pitcher
- Born: July 4, 2000 (age 26); Santo Domingo, Dominican Republic
- Bats: Right Throws: Right

MLB debut
- April 24, 2025, for the Colorado Rockies

MLB statistics (through 2026 season)
- Win–loss record: 6–8
- Earned run average: 4.66
- Strikeouts: 134
- Stats at Baseball Reference

Teams
- Colorado Rockies (2025–present)
Medals
Men's baseball
Representing Dominican Republic
World Baseball Classic
Bronze medal – third place	2026 Miami	Team

Juan Manuel Mejía (born July 4, 2000) is a Dominican professional baseball pitcher for the Colorado Rockies of Major League Baseball (MLB). He made his MLB debut in 2025.

== Career ==
=== 2017–2024: minors ===
Mejía signed with the Colorado Rockies as an international free agent on May 5, 2017, receiving a $140,000 signing bonus. A Rockies scout first noticed Mejía at a tryout where the team was scouting a different pitcher. He made his professional debut with the Dominican Summer League Rockies, posting a 2.84 ERA in 16 games. Mejía returned to the DSL Rockies in 2018, accumulating a 3–5 record and 5.43 ERA with 61 strikeouts in 58 innings pitched across 13 starts.

Mejía made 24 appearances for the rookie-level Grand Junction Rockies in 2019, recording a 2.83 ERA with 28 strikeouts and four saves across 28 2/3 innings pitched. He did not play in a game in 2020 due to the cancellation of the minor league season because of the COVID-19 pandemic. Mejía returned to action in 2021 with the Single-A Fresno Grizzlies, posting a 3–5 record and 4.82 ERA with 66 strikeouts and eight saves over 43 appearances.

Mejía made 44 total appearances split between Fresno and the High-A Spokane Indians in 2022, accumulating a 3–3 record and 4.68 ERA with 60 strikeouts and six saves over 50 innings. He split the 2023 season between Spokane and the Double-A Hartford Yard Goats. In 48 appearances out of the bullpen for the two affiliates, Mejía had a 3–5 record, two saves, 5.06 ERA, and 86 strikeouts across 58 2/3 innings pitched. He began working with the Rockies' mental skills coach during the season, trying to shake off poor performances. He pitched in the Arizona Fall League after the season, using a new grip on his slider that increased its velocity. On November 14, the Rockies added Mejía to their 40-man roster to protect him from the Rule 5 draft.

Mejía was optioned to the Hartford to begin the 2024 season. In 47 appearances, which led the Eastern League, he posted a 4–4 record and 5.00 ERA with 65 strikeouts and 6 saves over 54 innings of work.

=== 2025: Rookie season ===
Mejía began the 2025 season with the Triple-A Albuquerque Isotopes. On April 24, Mejía was promoted to the major leagues for the first time to serve as the 27th man for the team's doubleheader against the Kansas City Royals. He pitched an inning in the second game of the doubleheader, allowing an unearned run following a throwing error by catcher Jacob Stallings. Mejía was promptly demoted but then called back up on April 27 before pitching for Albuquerque. After four scoreless outings, he allowed 7 runs (three unearned) in a 21–0 loss to the San Diego Padres on May 10, then demoted again. He was back in the majors two weeks later.

On August 17, Mejía earned his first major league save, which he sealed by making a jumping catch on a weakly hit Ketel Marte ball, colliding with first baseman Warming Bernabel. Mejía made 55 relief appearances for Colorado during his rookie campaign, posting a 2–2 record, one save, a 3.96 ERA, and 68 strikeouts across 61 1/3 innings pitched. He threw primarily a fastball and slider, occasionally throwing a changeup that he said he lacked confidence in throwing.
