= Colorado Rockies minor league players =

List of baseball players

Below is a partial list of minor league baseball players in the Colorado Rockies system and rosters of their minor league affiliates:

== Players ==
=== Cristian Arguelles ===
Cristian Arguelles

Colorado Rockies
- Outfielder
- Born: June 30, 2007 (age 19); Coro, Venezuela
- Bats: Left Throws: Left

Cristian Arguelles (born June 30, 2007) is a Venezuelan professional baseball outfielder in the Colorado Rockies organization.

Arguelles signed with the Colorado Rockies as an international free agent in January 2024 for $700,000. He made his professional debut that year with the Rookie-level Dominican Summer League Rockies and batted .267 with 25 runs batted in (RBI) and 12 strikeouts across 172 at-bats.

Arguelles returned to play for the DSL Rockies in 2025 and hit .422 with five home runs and 55 RBI across 52 games. He was named the DSL Most Valuable Player. Arguelles was assigned to the Rookie-level Arizona Complex League Rockies to begin the 2026 season with whom he hit .402 with nine home runs and 70 RBI across 57 games. In July, he was promoted to the Single-A Fresno Grizzlies and batted .246 with two home runs and 22 RBI over 35 games.

- Career statistics from Baseball Reference (Minors)

=== Bryant Betancourt ===
Bryant Betancourt

Colorado Rockies
- Catcher
- Born: October 12, 2003 (age 23); Valencia, Venezuela
- Bats: Left Throws: Right

Bryant Osneiber Betancourt (born October 12, 2003) is a Venezuelan professional baseball catcher in the Colorado Rockies organization.

Betancourt signed with the Colorado Rockies as an international free agent in January 2021. The Rockies added him to their 40-man roster after the 2026 season.

- Career statistics from Baseball Reference (Minors)

=== Roldy Brito ===
Roldy Brito

Colorado Rockies
- Second baseman / Outfielder
- Born: April 8, 2007 (age 19); Bonao, Dominican Republic
- Bats: Switch Throws: Right

Roldy Brito (born April 8, 2007) is a Dominican professional baseball second baseman and outfielder in the Colorado Rockies organization.

Brito signed with the Colorado Rockies as an international free agent in January 2024. He made his professional debut that year with the Dominican Summer League Rockies.

Brito played 2025 with the Arizona Complex League Rockies and Fresno Grizzlies. He was the Arizona Complex League MVP and was named the Doug Million Minor League Player of the Year, which is given by the Rockies to their best minor league player. In 2026, the Rockies invited Brito to spring training.

- Career statistics from Baseball Reference (Minors)

=== Robert Calaz ===
Robert Calaz

Colorado Rockies
- Outfielder
- Born: November 22, 2005 (age 20); Monte Plata, Dominican Republic
- Bats: Right Throws: Right

Robert Humberto Calaz (born November 22, 2005) is a Dominican professional baseball outfielder in the Colorado Rockies organization.

Calaz signed with the Colorado Rockies as an international free agent in January 2023. He made his professional debut that year with the Dominican Summer League Rockies.

Calaz played 2024 with the Arizona Complex League Rockies and Fresno Grizzlies. He was named the Complex League MVP after hitting .349/.462/.651 with 10 home runs and 56 runs batted in (RBI).

- Career statistics from Baseball Reference (Minors)

=== Jackson Cox ===
Jackson Cox

Colorado Rockies
- Pitcher
- Born: September 25, 2003 (age 23); Portland, Oregon, U.S.
- Bats: Right Throws: Right

Jackson Gregory Cox (born September 25, 2003) is an American professional baseball pitcher in the Colorado Rockies organization.

Cox attended Toutle Lake High School in Toutle, Washington. He was selected by the Colorado Rockies in the second round with the 50th overall pick of the 2022 Major League Baseball draft. He signed with the team for $1.85 million, forgoing his commitment to play college baseball at the University of Oregon.

Cox made his professional debut in 2023 with the Single-A Fresno Grizzlies and had a 1–0 record, a 7.26 ERA, 32 strikeouts, and 20 walks across 31 innings. He underwent Tommy John surgery in July, ending his season early and forcing him to also miss the entirety of the 2024 season. Cox returned to play with Fresno for the 2025 season and started 23 games in which he went 4–6 with a 3.39 ERA and 92 strikeouts over 85 innings. He was assigned to the High-A Spokane Indians to open the 2026 season. Cox made 10 starts with Spokane and pitched to a 4–1 record, a 4.23 ERA, and 78 strikeouts across 55 1/3 innings and was promoted to the Double-A Hartford Yard Goats in June. Across nine starts with Hartford, he went 2–4 with a 4.29 ERA and 50 strikeouts over 42 innings. After the season, the Rockies added Cox to their 40-man roster to protect him from the Rule 5 draft.

- Career statistics from Baseball Reference (Minors)

=== Konner Eaton ===
Konner Eaton

Colorado Rockies
- Pitcher
- Born: November 30, 2002 (age 23); Hopewell, Virginia, U.S.
- Bats: Left Throws: Left

Konner R. Eaton (born November 30, 2002) is an American professional baseball pitcher in the Colorado Rockies organization.

Eaton attended Prince George High School in Prince George, Virginia, and played college baseball at George Mason University for the Patriots. In 2023, he played in the Cape Cod Baseball League with the Orleans Firebirds. As a junior at George Mason in 2024, Eaton started 14 games and had a 3–2 record, a 5.66 ERA, and 82 strikeouts across 62 innings pitched.

Eaton was selected by the Colorado Rockies in the sixth round of the 2024 Major League Baseball draft. He made his professional debut after signing with the Fresno Grizzlies and also played with the Spokane Indians, giving up one run over 11 innings between both teams. Eaton was assigned to Spokane to open the 2025 season and was promoted to the Hartford Yard Goats in August. Over 27 starts between the two clubs, he went 6–9 with a 3.79 ERA and 149 strikeouts across 140 innings. He returned to Hartford for the 2026 season. Eaton made 23 starts for Hartford and went 5–3 with a 4.46 ERA and 103 strikeouts across 107 innings pitched. After the season, he was assigned to play in the Arizona Fall League with the Salt River Rafters.

- Career statistics from Baseball Reference (Minors)
- George Mason Patriots bio

=== Griffin Herring ===
Griffin Herring

Colorado Rockies
- Pitcher
- Born: May 7, 2003 (age 23); Grapevine, Texas, U.S.
- Bats: Right Throws: Left

Griffin Garner Herring (born May 7, 2003) is an American professional baseball pitcher in the Colorado Rockies organization.

Herring attended Carroll Senior High School in Southlake, Texas. As a senior in 2022, he was The Dallas Morning News Baseball Player of the Year after going 13–1 with a 0.24 earned run average (ERA) and 145 strikeouts over 87 innings. Herring played college baseball at Louisiana State University (LSU), where he was a relief pitcher. In 2024, he played collegiate summer baseball with the Chatham Anglers of the Cape Cod Baseball League.

Herring was selected by the New York Yankees in the sixth round of the 2024 Major League Baseball draft. The Yankees converted him into a starting pitcher, and he made his professional debut in 2025 with the Tampa Tarpons.

On July 25, 2025, the Yankees traded Herring to the Colorado Rockies, along with Josh Grosz, in exchange for Ryan McMahon.

- Career statistics from Baseball Reference (Minors)

=== Antoine Jean ===
Antoine Jean

Colorado Rockies
- Pitcher
- Born: August 1, 2001 (age 25); Montreal, Quebec, Canada
- Bats: Right Throws: Left

Antoine Jean (born August 1, 2001) is a Canadian professional baseball pitcher for the Colorado Rockies of Major League Baseball (MLB). He was named to the Canada national baseball team for the 2026 World Baseball Classic.

Jean grew up in Montreal, Quebec, and played for the Academie de Baseball Canada. In the 2019 MLB Draft, Jean was drafted in the 19th round by the Minnesota Twins. However, he instead chose to play college baseball for the University of Alabama. In 2022 and 2023, he played collegiate summer baseball with the Falmouth Commodores of the Cape Cod Baseball League.

Jean transferred to the University of Houston for the 2024 season. Jean struggled in his first season, pitching to a 5.97 ERA. However, after converting to a reliever, he experienced a bounceback in 2025. Jean was named the Big 12 Pitcher of the Year, becoming the first reliever to win the award. In 21 games, Jean pitched 67 innings with a 2.55 ERA and 110 strikeouts. After the season, Jean was also named Canadian player of the year by the Canadian Baseball Network.

Jean was drafted by the Colorado Rockies in the 7th round of the 2025 MLB draft.

- Career statistics from Baseball Reference (Minors)

=== Dyan Jorge ===
Dyan Jorge

Colorado Rockies
- Shortstop
- Born: March 18, 2003 (age 23); Havana, Cuba
- Bats: Right Throws: Right

Dyan Yamel Jorge (born March 18, 2003) is a Cuban professional baseball shortstop for the Colorado Rockies of Major League Baseball (MLB).

Jorge signed with the Colorado Rockies as an international free agent in January 2022. He made his professional debut in 2022 with the Dominican Summer League Rockies.

Jorge played 2023 with the Arizona Complex League Rockies and Fresno Grizzlies and started 2024 with the Spokane Indians.

- Career statistics from Baseball Reference (Minors)

=== Jake Madden ===
Jake Madden

Colorado Rockies
- Pitcher
- Born: December 26, 2001 (age 24); Camp Hill, Pennsylvania, U.S.
- Bats: Right Throws: Right

Jake Thomas Madden (born December 26, 2001) is an American baseball pitcher in the Colorado Rockies organization.

Madden grew up in Harrisburg, Pennsylvania and attended East Pennsboro High School. He committed to play college baseball at South Carolina from 15 scholarship offers during his junior year. Madden tore his ulnar collateral ligament in his senior season and continued to play as East Pennsboro's designated hitter. He decommitted from South Carolina in the summer after his senior year and instead enrolled at Northwest Florida State College.

Madden redshirted his first season at Northwest Florida while recovering from Tommy John surgery to repair his elbow injury. He committed to transfer to Alabama for his remaining collegiate eligibility prior to his sophomore season. As a redshirt freshman, Madden went 4-4 with a 4.53 ERA and 76 strikeouts in 42 2/3 innings pitched. He dealt with blister issues on his pitching hand throughout the season.

Madden was selected in the fourth round by the Los Angeles Angels in the 2022 Major League Baseball draft. He signed with the Angels on July 22, 2022, for an over-slot signing bonus of $997,500.

On July 30, 2023, Madden and was traded along with Mason Albright to the Colorado Rockies in exchange for C. J. Cron and Randal Grichuk.

- Career statistics from Baseball Reference (Minors)
- Northwest Florida State Raiders bio

=== Jack Mahoney ===
Jack Mahoney

Colorado Rockies
- Pitcher
- Born: August 13, 2001 (age 25); Algonquin, Illinois, U.S.
- Bats: Right Throws: Right

Jack Murphy Mahoney (born August 13, 2001) is an American professional baseball pitcher in the Colorado Rockies organization.

Mahoney attended St. Viator High School in Arlington Heights, Illinois, where he played baseball as a shortstop and pitcher, football as a quarterback, and basketball. After graduating, he played college baseball at the University of South Carolina. In 2021, his freshman year, he posted a 1.62 ERA over 14 games before undergoing Tommy John surgery, forcing him to miss the remainder of the 2021 season and all of the 2022 season. Mahoney returned to play as a junior in 2023 and started 17 games, going 7–4 with a 4.16 ERA and 84 strikeouts. After the season, he was selected by the Colorado Rockies in the third round of the 2023 Major League Baseball draft.

After signing with the Rockies, Mahoney made his professional debut with the Rookie-level Arizona Complex League Rockies, pitching a total of two innings for the season. He was assigned to the Single-A Fresno Grizzlies to open the 2024 season. In late July, he was promoted to the High-A Spokane Indians, with whom he finished the year. Over 23 games (22 starts) between both teams, Mahoney went 6–7 with a 3.90 ERA and 115 strikeouts over 120 innings. For the 2025 season, he was assigned to the Double-A Hartford Yard Goats. Over 24 starts, Mahoney went 3–10 with a 5.93 ERA, 81 strikeouts, and 46 walks over 104 2/3 innings. After the season, he was assigned to play in the Arizona Fall League with the Salt River Rafters. Mahoney opened the 2026 season with Hartford and made 13 starts in which he had a 7–1 record, a 1.99 ERA, and 64 strikeouts over 68 innings. He was promoted to the Triple-A Albuquerque Isotopes in August and pitched to a 0–2 record with a 6.21 ERA across eight starts. After the season, the Rockies added Mahoney to their 40-man roster to protect him from the Rule 5 draft.

- Career statistics from Baseball Reference (Minors)
- South Carolina Gamecocks bio

=== Aiden May ===
Aiden May

Colorado Rockies
- Pitcher
- Born: April 22, 2003 (age 23); Albuquerque, New Mexico, U.S.
- Bats: Right Throws: Right

Aiden Tyler May (born April 22, 2003) is an American professional baseball pitcher in the Colorado Rockies organization.

May attended Sandia High School in Albuquerque, New Mexico. He played one year of college baseball at Pima Community College in 2022, and then transferred to the University of Arizona for the 2023 season. With Arizona in 2023, May made 16 starts and had a 5–3 record, a 6.33 ERA, and 77 strikeouts across 75 1/3 innings. After the 2023 season, he transferred to Oregon State University. In May's lone year at Oregon State in 2024, he started 14 games and had a 7–1 record, a 3.05 ERA, and 84 strikeouts across 73 2/3 innings.

May was selected by the Miami Marlins with the 70th overall pick in the 2024 Major League Baseball draft. He made his professional debut in July of 2025 with the Rookie-level Florida Complex League Marlins and was promoted to the Single-A Jupiter Hammerheads during the season. Across ten games (nine starts), he had a 1–1 record, a 2.63 ERA, and 30 strikeouts across 27 1/3 innings. After the season, he played in the Arizona Fall League with the Mesa Solar Sox. May was assigned to the High-A Beloit Sky Carp to begin the 2026 season. On April 19, he pitched six innings of a combined no-hitter alongside Justin Storm against the South Bend Cubs.

On August 3, 2026, May and Connor Norby were traded to the Colorado Rockies in exchange for Victor Vodnik. The Rockies assigned him to the High-A Spokane Indians. Across 19 starts for the 2026 season between Beloit and Spokane, May had a 5–5 record, a 3.96 ERA, and 71 strikeouts over 91 innings.

- Career statistics from Baseball Reference (Minors)
- Oregon State Beavers bio

=== Cole Messina ===
Cole Messina

Colorado Rockies
- Catcher
- Born: May 14, 2003 (age 23); Mount Pleasant, South Carolina, U.S.
- Bats: Right Throws: Right

Michael Cole Messina (born May 14, 2003) is an American professional baseball catcher in the Colorado Rockies organization.

Messina attended Summerville High School in Summerville, South Carolina and played college baseball at the University of South Carolina for the Gamecocks. He played sparingly as a freshman at South Carolina in 2022, appearing in 17 games with a .133 batting average. In 2023, Messina started 62 games and batted .307 with 17 home runs and 65 RBI and was named first-team All-SEC. As a junior in 2024, Messina started 59 games for the Gamecocks and hit .326 with 21 home runs and 71 RBI and was awarded the Johnny Bench Award.

Messina was selected by the Colorado Rockies in the third round with the 77th overall pick of the 2024 Major League Baseball draft. He signed with the team for $1 million.

Messina made his professional debut after signing with the Spokane Indians, appearing in 17 games and hitting .140 with one home run. Messina returned to Spokane to open the 2025 season and batted .259 with seven home runs, 42 RBI, 23 doubles and 14 stolen bases across 107 games. He also lead the league with 690 1/3 innings caught, 67 assists, 40 batters caught stealing, and a 39% caught-stealing rate, and was named a Northwest League All-Star. At the season's end, he was promoted to the Hartford Yard Goats for whom he appeared in three games. Messina returned to Hartford for the 2026 season. Across 95 games, he hit .226 with eight home runs and 46 RBI.

- Career statistics from Baseball Reference (Minors)
- South Carolina Gamecocks bio

=== Jared Thomas ===
Jared Thomas

Colorado Rockies
- Outfielder
- Born: July 1, 2003 (age 23); Dallas, Texas, U.S.
- Bats: Left Throws: Left

Jared Alan Thomas (born July 1, 2003) is an American professional baseball outfielder in the Colorado Rockies organization.

Thomas grew up in Waxahachie, Texas and attended Waxahachie High School. Thomas played two seasons of college baseball for the Texas Longhorns. He batted .321 with four home runs, 29 RBIs, and 10 stolen bases during his freshman season. Thomas was named first-team All-Big 12 Conference after hitting .349 with 15 doubles, 16 home runs, and 18 stolen bases as a sophomore.

Thomas was selected in the second round of the 2024 Major League Baseball draft by the Colorado Rockies. He signed with the team for $2 million. Thomas was assigned to the Fresno Grizzlies of the Single-A California League to begin his professional career and hit .333 across eight games. He opened the 2025 season with the Spokane Indians of the High-A Northwest League and was promoted to the Hartford Yard Goats of the Double-A Eastern League in June. Across 118 games between both teams, Thomas hit .300 with 14 home runs, 60 RBI and 33 stolen bases. After the season, he played in the Arizona Fall League with the Salt River Rafters. Thomas opened the 2026 season on the injured list while recovering from offseason wrist surgery.

- Career statistics from Baseball Reference (Minors)
- Texas Longhorns bio

=== Braylen Wimmer ===
Braylen Wimmer

Colorado Rockies
- Shortstop
- Born: December 27, 2000 (age 25); Oklahoma City, Oklahoma, U.S.
- Bats: Right Throws: Right

Braylen Matthew Wimmer (born December 27, 2000) is an American professional baseball shortstop in the Colorado Rockies organization.

Wimmer attended Yukon High School in Yukon, Oklahoma. As a senior in 2019, he hit .410 with six home runs. Wimmer then played four seasons of college baseball at the University of South Carolina for the Gamecocks. After the 2021 season, he played in the Cape Cod Baseball League with the Bourne Braves. In 2022, Wimmer played in 55 games for the Gamecocks and hit .312 with seven home runs and 35 RBIs. He was selected by the Philadelphia Phillies in the 18th round of the 2022 Major League Baseball draft but opted not to sign. Wimmer appeared in 56 games for South Carolina in 2023 and batted .304 with 14 home runs and 42 RBIs.

Wimmer was selected by the Colorado Rockies in the eighth round of the 2023 Major League Baseball draft. He signed with the team for $157,050. Wimmer made his professional debut with the Arizona Complex League Rockies, hitting .383 over 14 games. He played the 2024 season with the Fresno Grizzlies and batted .285 with 14 home runs, 64 RBIs, and 34 stolen bases over 118 games. Wimmer was assigned to the Spokane Indians to open the 2025 season and was promoted to the Hartford Yard Goats in July. He was named Northwest League Player of the Month in May for his performance with Spokane. Over 131 games between Spokane and Hartford, Wimmer hit .296 with 17 home runs, 69 RBIs, and 37 stolen bases. He was assigned to play in the Arizona Fall League (AFL) with the Salt River Rafters after the season. During the AFL season, he was diagnosed with a brain tumor and underwent an awake craniotomy. Wimmer returned to Hartford for the 2026 season. Across 81 games, he batted .253 with four home runs, 30 RBIs, and 30 stolen bases.

- Career statistics from Baseball Reference (Minors)
- South Carolina Gamecocks bio

== Full Triple-A to Rookie League rosters ==
=== Triple-A ===
Albuquerque Isotopes roster
Players		Coaches/Other
Pitchers: 31 Mason Albright; 63 Andrew Baker; 36 Jake Brooks; 40 Jarrod Cande; 43 Mason Green; 94 Evan Justice; 22 Jack Mahoney; 61 Evan Shawver	Catchers: 4 Bryant Betancourt; 30 Jose Cordova; Infielders: 25 Nic Kent; 6 Roc Riggio; Outfielders: 24 Charlie Condon	Manager: 16 Pedro Lopez; Coaches: 54 Craig Bjornson (pitching); 3 Luis Lopez (bench); 29 Matt Snyder (hitting); 7-day injured list; * On Colorado Rockies 40-man roster; ~ Development list; # Rehab assignment; ∞ Reserve list; ‡ Restricted list; § Suspended list; † Temporarily inactive list; Roster updated November 2, 2026; Transactions; → More rosters: MiLB • Pacific Coast League; → Colorado Rockies minor league players

=== Double-A ===
Hartford Yard Goats roster
Players		Coaches/Other
Pitchers: 31 Nathan Blasick; 35 Jackson Cox; 36 Cade Denton; 25 Konner Eaton; 53 Stu Flesland III; 23 Bryson Hammer; 50 Fisher Jameson; 13 Victor Juarez; 26 Hunter Mann; 24 Davison Palermo; 13 Michael Prosecky; 55 Ben Shields; 55 Austin Smith; 16 Connor Staine; 18 Carlos Torres; 51 Fidel Ulloa	Catchers: 32 Cole Messina; 45 Jimmy Obertop; Infielders: 4 GJ Hill; 1 Dyan Jorge; 15 Aidan Longwell; 27 Skyler Messinger; 9 Jack O'Dowd; 7 Andy Perez; 10 Tevin Tucker; 8 Braylen Wimmer; Outfielders: 40 Mike Antico; 0 Jacob Humphrey; 6 Zach Kokoska; 2 Jared Thomas	Manager: 46 Robinson Cancel; Coaches: 5 Zach Osborne (hitting); 12 Michael Ryan (bench); 30 Jerry Sullivan (pitching); 7-day injured list; * On Colorado Rockies 40-man roster; ~ Development list; # Rehab assignment; ∞ Reserve list; ‡ Restricted list; § Suspended list; † Temporarily inactive list; Roster updated November 2, 2026; Transactions; → More rosters: MiLB • Eastern League; → Colorado Rockies minor league players

=== High-A ===
Spokane Indians roster
Players		Coaches/Other
Pitchers: 11 Brody Brecht; 24 Everett Catlett; 20 Seth Clausen; 23 Isaiah Coupet; 41 Dylan Crooks; 10 Austin Emener; 25 Tyler Hampu; 27 Luke Hansel; 44 Yujanyer Herrera; 23 Antoine Jean; 35 Angel Jimenez; 48 Lebarron Johnson Jr.; 22 Justin Loer; 29 Jake Madden; 47 Aiden May; 30 Jordy Vargas	Catchers: 28 Juan Castillo; 19 Alan Espinal; 34 Blake Penso; Infielders: 27 Derek Bernard; 1 Roldy Brito; 18 Wilder Dalis; 15 Ethan Hedges; 7 Kelvin Hidalgo; 14 Jacob Hinderleider; 4 Tommy Hopfe; 34 Tanner Thach; -- Blake Wright; Outfielders: 31 Max Belyeu; 44 Robert Calaz; 16 Lorenzo Carrier; 11 Clayton Gray; 27 Cameron Nelson	Manager: 21 Tom Sutaris; Coaches: 38 Blaine Beatty (pitching); 8 Tyler Ladendorf (performance); 9 Edgardo Lebron (bench); -- Allison Krajewski (performance); 7-day injured list; * On Colorado Rockies 40-man roster; ~ Development list; # Rehab assignment; ∞ Reserve list; ‡ Restricted list; § Suspended list; † Temporarily inactive list; Roster updated November 2, 2026; Transactions; → More rosters: MiLB • Northwest League; → Colorado Rockies minor league players

=== Single-A ===
Fresno Grizzlies roster
Players		Coaches/Other
Pitchers: 19 Luichi Casilla; 26 Tyrelle Chadwick; 24 Ethan Cole; 18 Yanzel Correa; 11 Ben Davis; 14 Redinson Gomez; -- Zach Harris; 40 Marcos Herrera; 26 Grif Hughes; -- Luke Jewett; 28 Riley Kelly; 11 Easton Marks; 10 JB Middleton; -- Zack Morris; 44 Izeah Muniz; 10 Sam Larson; 45 Austin Newton; 28 Manuel Olivarez; 20 Sandy Ozuna; 32 Brady Parker; 49 Wilmis Paulino; 28 Tanner Sagouspe; 25 Derrick Smith; 21 Bryson Van Sickle	Catchers: 31 Jesus Freitez; 3 Daniel Jackson; 5 Jack Natili; 13 Zach Rogacki; Infielders: 9 Ashly Andujar; 8 Sebastian Blanco; 7 Ethan Holliday; 1 Juan Martinez; 2 Ryan Niedzwiedz; 22 Aidan Redahan; 29 Ronny Ugarte; Outfielders: 16 Cristian Arguelles; 23 Kyle Fossum; 4 Cort MacDonald; 25 Carlos Renzullo; 34 Landyn Vidourek	Manager: 6 Cesar Galvez; Coaches: 27 Geoff Brown (pitching); 12 Greg Jones (hitting); -- Jeremiah Stewart (performance); 30 Gary Templeton III (bench); 7-day injured list; * On Colorado Rockies 40-man roster; ~ Development list; # Rehab assignment; ∞ Reserve list; ‡ Restricted list; § Suspended list; † Temporarily inactive list; Roster updated November 2, 2026; Transactions; → More rosters: MiLB • California League; → Colorado Rockies minor league players

=== Rookie ===
Arizona Complex League Rockies roster
Players		Coaches/Other
Pitchers: -- Hudson Barrett; -- Garrett Brewer; -- Luke Broderick; 19 Yeremmy Cabeza; 88 Reiver Camacho; 53 Kevin Concepcion; 55 Odarlin Cruz; 24 Efrain Cubilla; 32 Sam Gerth; 39 Andres Herrera; -- Griffin Herring; -- Garrett Lambert; 35 Carlos Martorella; -- Bryce McGowan; -- Jhon Medina; 44 Moizes Meza; -- Mikiah Negrete; 34 Eliezer Pena; 45 Marcos Pimentel; -- Tyler Putnam; -- Logan Reddemann; 48 Gregory Sanchez; -- Jack Scott; -- Gavin Swartz; -- Josh Swink; 38 Alison Zacarias	Catchers: -- Cruzmel Arias; 18 Jose De La Cruz; -- Matt Klein; -- Talmadge LeCroy; 26 Gabriel Lopez; Infielders: -- Tyler Bell; -- Jeremy Ciriaco; -- Parker Coddou; 0 Eriel Dihigo; 5 Dariel Garcia; -- Aiden Meola; 15 Kamuel Villar; -- Ben Wilmes; Outfielders: -- Juriel Collazo; 20 Alessander De La Cruz; -- Yeiker Reyes; -- Dmitri Williams Jr.	Manager: -- Fred Ocasio; Coaches: -- Julio Campos (hitting); -- Jaylin Davis (development); -- Owen Cuffe (pitching); -- Aaron Munoz (bench); -- Helmis Rodriguez (pitching); -- MJ Rookard (hitting); 7-day injured list; * On Colorado Rockies 40-man roster; ~ Development list; # Rehab assignment; ∞ Reserve list; ‡ Restricted list; § Suspended list; † Temporarily inactive list; Roster updated November 2, 2026; Transactions; → More rosters: MiLB • Arizona Complex League; → Colorado Rockies minor league players

=== Foreign Rookie ===
Dominican Summer League Colorado roster
Players		Coaches/Other
Pitchers: 15 Lenixon Armas; 16 Diego Arroyo; 59 Johander Barrios; 62 Maique Basanta; 24 Victor Castellano; 19 Ismael Contreras; 21 Onofer De La Cruz; 26 Maximo Gonzalez; 20 Josue Henrique; 23 Jarol Lopez; 24 Alejandro Martinez; 28 Kevin Martinez; 27 Yeremi Mendez; 29 Gleiderson Mendoza; 68 Kevin Meza; 29 Pedro Nunez; 31 Edwin Pena; 20 Oscar Pujols; 31 Rafael Quezada; 37 Roberto Salas; 82 Melky Ventura; 55 Eric Veras; 36 Juan Villamizar	Catchers: 7 Jose Gudino; -- Adafel Montiel; 12 Bryan Rodriguez; 45 Douglas Veliz; Infielders: 44 Richard De Los Santos; -- Rosniell De Paula; 3 William Ferrufino; 5 Jendry Guaraco; 13 Omar Marrugo; 2 Yhoscar Perez; 6 Larry Suero; 13 Carlos Vielma; Outfielders: -- Leudy Arache; 11 Hector Barroso; 50 Wandi Feliz; 8 Luis Morejon; 52 Carlos Mota; 9 Omar Munoz	Manager: -- Eugenio Jose; Coaches: -- Johendi Jiminian (pitching); -- Florentino Nunez (hitting); 7-day injured list; * On Colorado Rockies 40-man roster; ~ Development list; # Rehab assignment; ∞ Reserve list; ‡ Restricted list; § Suspended list; † Temporarily inactive list; Roster updated November 11, 2026; Transactions; → More rosters: MiLB • Dominican Summer League; → Colorado Rockies minor league players

Dominican Summer League Rockies roster
Players		Coaches/Other
Pitchers: 58 Angel Adames; 57 Cristopher Alburquerque; 59 Johander Barrios; 63 Felix Bello; 61 Luis Centeno; 25 Kahley Chan; 60 Oby Escalante; 63 Brandol Fernandez; 80 Ronaldo Florencio; 64 Anderson Franco; 73 Mario Garcia; 69 Christopher Green; 70 Dilan Lopez; 76 Dalvin Marte; 71 Luis Martinez; 72 Emanuel Mejia; 74 Jean Nino; 79 Netali Pinales; 38 Maximiliano Quezada; 66 Yadiel Ramon; 66 Yenderberth Rivas; 75 Miguel Vargas	Catchers: 14 Abraham Elvira; -- Jhonalbert Vargas; 56 Jose Zarraga; Infielders: -- Danny Cancro; 41 Amaury De Leon; 43 Daniel Meza; 46 Darling Pena; 47 Emil Perez; 4 Maiker Ramirez; Outfielders: 52 Gemerson Blanco; 83 Carlos Brito; 49 Ishel Comenencia	Manager: Mauricio Gonzalez; Coaches: Samuel Deduno (pitching); Felix Rosario (hitting); 7-day injured list; * On Colorado Rockies 40-man roster; ~ Development list; # Rehab assignment; ∞ Reserve list; ‡ Restricted list; § Suspended list; † Temporarily inactive list; Roster updated November 11, 2026; Transactions; → More rosters: MiLB • Dominican Summer League; → Colorado Rockies minor league players
