= Warren Schaeffer =

American baseball manager and coach (born 1985)

Colorado Rockies – No. 4
- Coach / Manager
- Born: January 28, 1985 (age 41); Vandergrift, Pennsylvania, U.S.
- Bats: Right Throws: Right

MLB statistics (through 2026 season)
- Managerial record: 94–190
- Winning percentage: .331
- Stats at Baseball Reference
- Managerial record at Baseball Reference

Teams
- As manager: Colorado Rockies (2025–present); As coach: Colorado Rockies (2023–2025)

Warren James Schaeffer (born January 28, 1985) is an American professional baseball coach who is currently the manager for the Colorado Rockies of Major League Baseball (MLB), having previously served as the team's third base coach.

== Amateur and minor league career ==
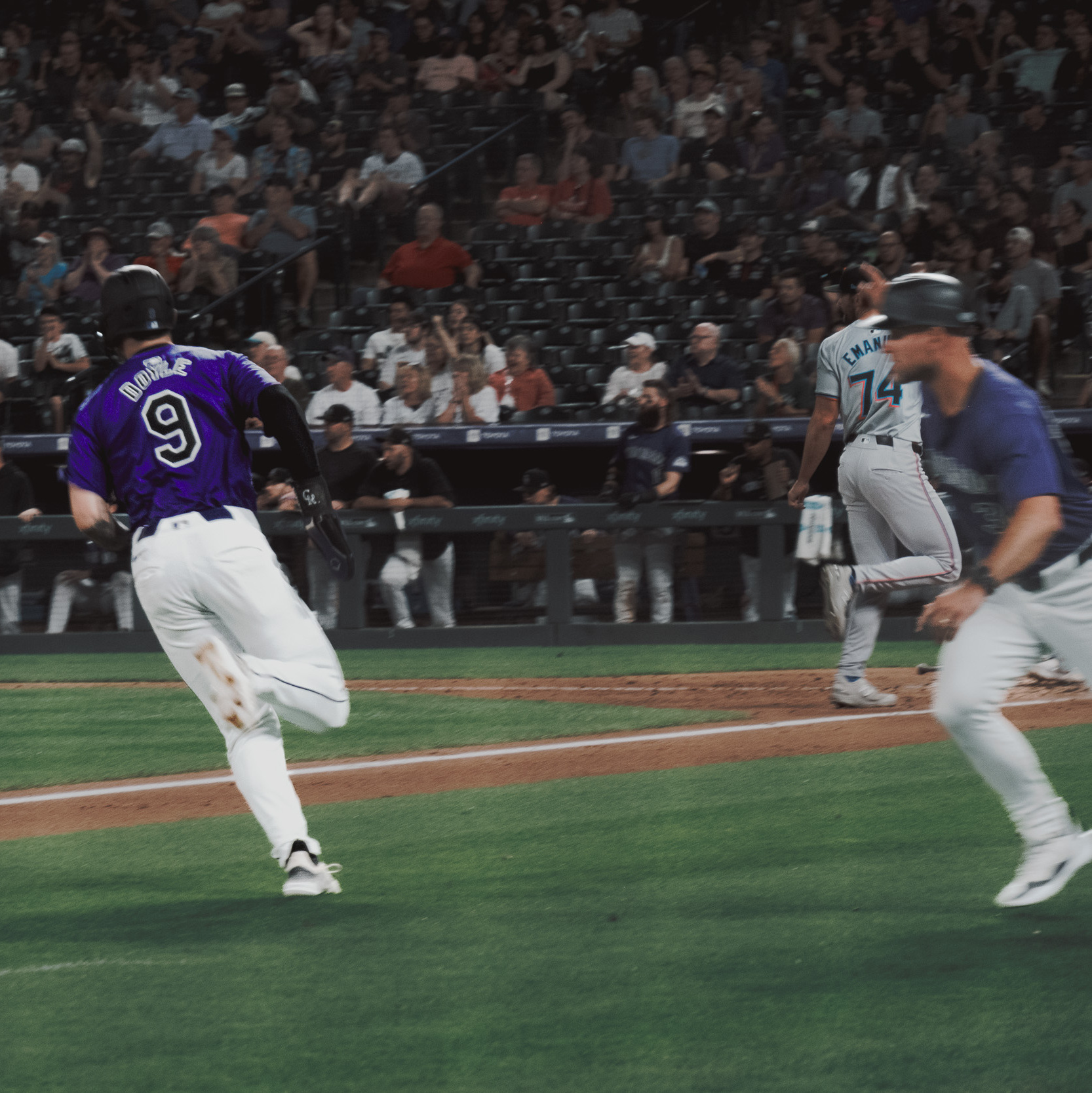
Schaeffer (right) coaching third base for the Rockies in 2024

=== High school ===
Schaeffer is from Vandergrift, Pennsylvania. He attended Greensburg Central Catholic High School in Greensburg, Pennsylvania, where he played on the school's baseball team as a shortstop and he led the Centurions to the PIAA Class A title and a runner-up finish in the WPIAL.

=== College ===
He enrolled at Virginia Tech and played for the Virginia Tech Hokies.

=== Minor league baseball ===
The Colorado Rockies selected Schaeffer in the 38th round of the 2007 MLB draft. He played in Minor League Baseball for the Rockies organization for six seasons.

== Coaching and managerial career ==
=== Coaching ===
After he retired, Schaeffer remained in the Rockies organization as a coach. Schaeffer was named the manager of the Asheville Tourists for the 2015 through 2017 seasons, and the Hartford Yard Goats for the 2018 and 2019 seasons. He was named the manager of the Albuquerque Isotopes for the 2020 season, which was cancelled due to the COVID-19 pandemic. He returned to manage Albuquerque in the 2021 and 2022 seasons.

On November 7, 2022, the Rockies promoted Schaeffer to their major league coaching staff as their third base and infield coach for the 2023 season.

=== Managing ===
Following their game on May 11, 2025, the Rockies, with a record of 7–33 (.175), named Schaeffer interim manager for the remainder of the 2025 season after firing Bud Black. Colorado finished the season 43–119 (.265), including a 36–86 record (.295) with Schaefer as manager.

On November 24, the Rockies removed Schaeffer's interim title, naming him as their manager.

== Managerial record ==
As of 2026 season

Team	Year	Regular season					Postseason			
Team	Year	Games	Won	Lost	Win %	Finish	Won	Lost	Win %	Result
COL	2025	122	36	86	.295	5th in NL West	–	–	–	
COL	2026	162	58	104	.358	5th in NL West	–	–	–	
Total		284	94	190	.331		0	0	–	

== Personal life ==
Schaeffer's wife, Callie (née Rhodes), played softball at Virginia Tech. They have two children.
