= Arizona Complex League Rockies =

- (1992–2000, 2021–present); Scottsdale, Arizona; previously in Mesa, Chandler, and Tucson

Minor league affiliations
- Class: Rookie
- League: Arizona Complex League
- Division: East
- Previous leagues: Arizona League (1992–2000)

Major league affiliations
- Team: Colorado Rockies (1992–2000, 2021–present)
- Previous teams: Chicago Cubs (1992)

Minor league titles
- League titles (2): 1998; 2026
- Division titles (3): 2021; 2023; 2026
- Wild card berths (1): 2022

Team data
- Name: ACL Rockies
- Previous names: AZL Rockies (1993–2000); AZL Rockies/Cubs (1992)
- Ballpark: Salt River Fields at Talking Stick (2021–present)
- Manager: Fred Ocasio

The Arizona Complex League Rockies are a professional baseball team competing as a Rookie-level affiliate of the Colorado Rockies in the Arizona Complex League of Minor League Baseball. The team plays its home games at Salt River Fields at Talking Stick near Scottsdale, Arizona. The team is composed mainly of players who are in their first year of professional baseball either as draftees or non-drafted free agents from the United States, Canada, Dominican Republic, Venezuela, and other countries.

== History ==
In 1992, the Colorado Rockies and Chicago Cubs fielded a cooperative team in the Arizona League (AZL), known as the Arizona League Rockies/Cubs. The team was then an affiliate of only the Rockies from 1993 to 2000, and named as such. The teams were located in Mesa (1992–1993), Chandler (1994–1997), and Tucson (1998–2000). The team won its first, and to date only, championship in 1998, under manager P. J. Carey.

Prior to the 2021 season, the Arizona League was renamed as the Arizona Complex League (ACL). Also in 2021, the Rockies rookie team returned to Arizona for the first time in 20 years.

== Roster ==
Arizona Complex League Rockies roster
Players	Coaches/Other
Pitchers: -- Hudson Barrett ∞; -- Garrett Brewer ∞; 19 Yeremmy Cabeza; 46 Luichi Casilla; 53 Kevin Concepcion; 55 Odarlin Cruz; 24 Efrain Cubilla; -- Ben Davis ∞; 49 Redinson Gomez; 39 Andres Herrera; -- Garrett Lambert ∞; -- Sam Larson ∞; 35 Carlos Martorella; 44 Moizes Meza; 27 Zack Morris #; -- Mikiah Negrete ∞; 37 Sandy Ozuna; 23 Alberto Pacheco; 21 Wilmis Paulino; 34 Eliezer Pena; 45 Marcos Pimentel; -- Tyler Putnam ∞; -- Logan Reddemann ∞; -- Tanner Sagouspe ∞; 48 Gregory Sanchez; -- Gavin Swartz ∞; -- Josh Swink ∞; 60 Case Williams #; 38 Alison Zacarias; Catchers: -- Cruzmel Arias; 18 Jose De La Cruz; -- Daniel Jackson ∞; 64 Matt Klein #; -- Talmadge LeCroy ∞; 26 Gabriel Lopez; -- Jack Natili ∞; 31 Blake Penso; Infielders: 2 Derek Bernard #; 6 Sebastian Blanco; 3 Parker Coddou; 0 Eriel Dihigo; 5 Dariel Garcia; -- Aiden Meola ∞; -- Ryan Niedzwiedz ∞; 30 Ronny Ugarte; 15 Kamuel Villar; 7 Ben Wilmes; Outfielders: 16 Cristian Arguelles; -- Lorenzo Carrier ∞; -- Juriel Collazo ∞; -- Cort MacDonald ∞; 8 Jared Thomas; -- Dmitri Williams Jr. ∞	Manager: -- Fred Ocasio; Coaches: -- Julio Campos (hitting); -- Jaylin Davis (development); -- Owen Cuffe (pitching); -- Aaron Munoz (bench); -- Helmis Rodriguez (pitching); -- MJ Rookard (hitting); 60-day injured list: -- Tyler Bell; -- Luke Broderick (full season); 88 Reiver Camacho; 20 Alessander De La Cruz; 32 Sam Gerth (full season); -- Bryce McGowan (full season); -- Jack Scott; 7-day injured list; * On Colorado Rockies 40-man roster; ~ Development list; # Rehab assignment; ∞ Reserve list; ‡ Restricted list; § Suspended list; † Temporarily inactive list; Roster updated July 27, 2026; Transactions; → More rosters: MiLB • Arizona Complex League; → Colorado Rockies minor league players
