= Tyler Bell =

American baseball player (born 2005)

Colorado Rockies
- Shortstop
- Born: June 30, 2005 (age 21); Bloomington, Illinois, U.S.
- Bats: Switch Throws: Right
- Stats at Baseball Reference

Tyler Jacob Bell (born June 30, 2005) is an American professional baseball shortstop in the Colorado Rockies organization.

== Amateur career ==
Bell attended Lincoln-Way East High School in Frankfort, Illinois, where he played on the school's baseball team. As a senior in 2024, he hit .391 with 25 RBI and 30 stolen bases. Bell was selected by the Tampa Bay Rays with the 66th overall pick of the 2024 Major League Baseball draft. He declined to sign with the team, and instead enrolled at the University of Kentucky to play college baseball for the Kentucky Wildcats.

As a freshman at Kentucky in 2025, Bell was named the team's starting shortstop. He played in 56 games and batted .296 with ten home runs, 46 RBI, and 11 stolen bases, earning a spot on the SEC All-Freshman Team. After the season, he briefly played collegiate summer baseball in the Cape Cod Baseball League with the Harwich Mariners. He was also named to the USA Baseball Collegiate National Team, the first Wildcat to be selected since Zack Thompson in 2018. Bell returned as the Wildcats’ shortstop to begin the 2026 season and was considered a top prospect for the upcoming MLB draft. Bell injured his left shoulder while making a diving play on Opening Day versus UNC Greensboro and was ruled out indefinitely. He returned to play less than a month later. Bell appeared in a total of 41 games for the Wildcats and batted .343 with nine home runs and 29 RBI. After the season, he was invited to the MLB Draft Combine at Chase Field.

== Professional career ==
Bell was selected by the Colorado Rockies in the first round with the 10th overall pick of the 2026 Major League Baseball draft. He signed with the Rockies for a $6 million signing bonus.
