= Colorado Rockies =

Major League Baseball franchise in Denver, Colorado, US

- 2026 Colorado Rockies season

Logo	Cap insignia
- Established in 1993

Major league affiliations
- National League (1993–present); West Division (1993–present)

Current uniform
- Retired numbers: 17; 33; 42; KSM

Colors
- Purple, black, silver, white

Name
- Colorado Rockies (1993–present)

Nicknames
- The Rox; The Blake Street Bombers

Ballpark
- Coors Field (1995–present); Mile High Stadium (1993–1994)

Major league titles
- World Series titles (0): None
- NL pennants (1): 2007
- NL West division titles (0): None
- Wild card berths (5): 1995; 2007; 2009; 2017; 2018

Front office
- Principal owner: Richard & Charles Monfort
- President: Walker Monfort
- President of baseball operations: Paul DePodesta
- General manager: Josh Byrnes
- Manager: Warren Schaeffer
- Mascots: Dinger
- Website: mlb.com/rockies

The Colorado Rockies are an American professional baseball team based in Denver. The Rockies compete in Major League Baseball (MLB) as a member club of the National League (NL) West Division. The team plays its home baseball games at Coors Field, which is located in the Lower Downtown area of Denver. The club is owned by the Monfort brothers.

The Rockies began as an expansion team for the 1993 season and played their home games for their first two seasons at Mile High Stadium. Since 1995, they have played at Coors Field, which has earned a reputation as a hitter's park, as demonstrated by the 1995 team that had four players (Dante Bichette, Vinny Castilla, Andrés Galarraga, and Larry Walker) each hit for 30 home runs; they were nicknamed the "Blake Street Bombers". The Rockies have qualified for the postseason five times, each time as a Wild Card winner. In 2007, the team earned its only NL pennant after winning 14 of their final 15 games in the regular season to secure a Wild Card position, capping the streak off with a 13-inning 9–8 victory against the San Diego Padres in the tiebreaker game affectionately known as "Game 163" by Rockies fans. The Rockies then proceeded to sweep the Philadelphia Phillies and Arizona Diamondbacks in the NLDS and NLCS and entered the 2007 World Series as winners of 21 of their last 22 games. However, they were swept by the American League (AL) champions Boston Red Sox in four games.

At the end of 2025, the Rockies have an all-time record of 2,364–2,818. This .456 winning percentage is the worst among active MLB franchises. After the Denver Nuggets won the 2023 NBA Finals, the Rockies became the only one of Denver's franchises in the major North American professional sports leagues yet to win a championship. They are also one of only two MLB teams to have never won a division title, alongside their 1993 expansion counterparts, the Miami Marlins.

The Rockies have played their home games at Coors Field since 1995. Their spring training home, Salt River Fields at Talking Stick in Scottsdale, Arizona, opened in March 2011 and is shared with the Arizona Diamondbacks.

== History ==
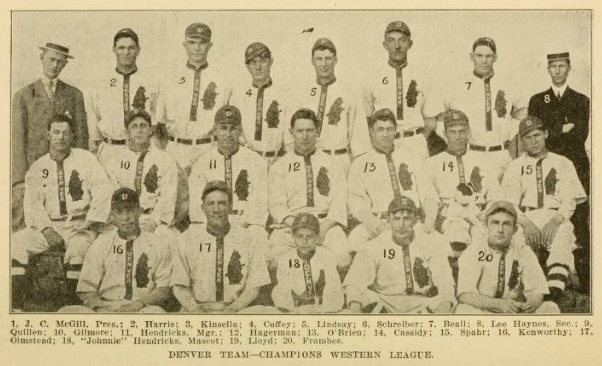
The 1911 Denver Grizzlies were recognized as one of the 100 greatest minor league teams of all time.

Denver had long been a hotbed of minor league baseball as far back as the late 19th century with the original Denver Bears (or Grizzlies) competing in the Western League before being replaced in 1955 by a Triple-A team of the same name. Residents and businesses in the area desired a Major League team. Denver's Mile High Stadium was built originally as Denver Bears Stadium, a minor league baseball stadium that could be upgraded to major league standards. Several previous attempts to bring Major League Baseball to Colorado had failed. In 1958, New York lawyer William Shea proposed the new Continental League as a rival to the two existing major leagues. In 1960, the Continental League announced that play would begin in April 1961 with eight teams, including one in Denver headed by Bob Howsam. The new league quickly evaporated, never playing a game, when the National League reached expansion agreements to place teams in New York City and Houston, removing much of the impetus behind the Continental League effort. Following the Pittsburgh drug trials in 1985, an unsuccessful attempt was made to purchase the Pittsburgh Pirates and relocate them. However, in January 1990, Colorado's chances for a new team improved when Coors Brewing Company became a limited partner with the AAA Denver Zephyrs.

=== 1990s ===
In 1991, as part of Major League Baseball's two-team expansion (along with the Florida (now Miami) Marlins), an ownership group representing Denver led by John Antonucci and Michael I. Monus was granted a franchise. They took the name "Rockies" due to Denver's proximity to the Rocky Mountains, which is reflected in their logo; the name was previously used by the city's first NHL team, now the New Jersey Devils. Monus and Antonucci were forced to drop out in 1992 after Monus's reputation was ruined by an accounting scandal. Trucking magnate Jerry McMorris stepped in at the 11th hour to save the franchise, allowing the team to begin play in 1993. The Rockies shared Mile High Stadium with the National Football League (NFL)'s Denver Broncos for their first two seasons while Coors Field was constructed. It was completed for the 1995 Major League Baseball season.

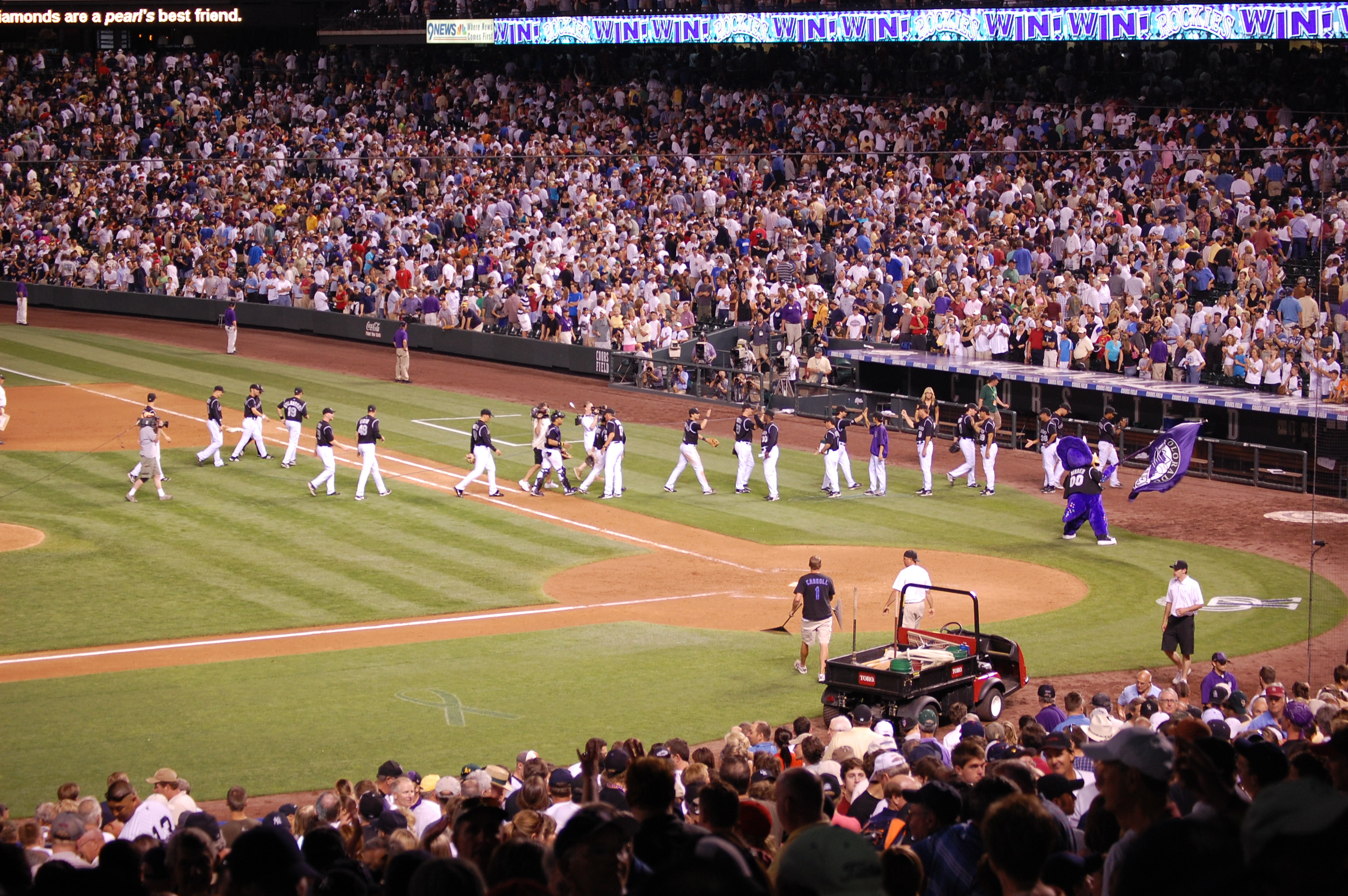
The Rockies in June 2007. Later the same year, Colorado won its first NL pennant

In 1993, they began play in the National League West. That year the Rockies set the all-time Major League record for attendance, drawing 4,483,350 fans, still the MLB record. The Rockies were MLB's first team based in the Mountain Time Zone.

=== 2000s ===
In 2007, the Rockies advanced to the World Series, only to be swept by the Boston Red Sox. The team's stretch run was among the greatest ever for a Major League Baseball team. Having a record of 76–72 at the start of play on September 16, the Rockies proceeded to win 14 of their final 15 regular season games. The stretch culminated with a 9–8, 13-inning victory over the San Diego Padres in a one-game playoff for the wild card berth. Colorado then swept their first seven playoff games to win the NL pennant. At the start of the World Series, the Rockies had won a total of 21 out of 22 games. Fans and media nicknamed their improbable October run "Rocktober".

=== 2010s ===
Colorado made postseason berths in 2017 and 2018. In 2018, the Rockies became the first team since the 1922 Philadelphia Phillies to play in four cities against four teams in five days, including the 162nd game of the regular season, NL West tie-breaker, NL Wild Card Game and NLDS Game 1, eventually losing to the Milwaukee Brewers in the NLDS.

=== 2020s ===
In 2023 and 2024, the Colorado Rockies lost over 100 games each season (103 games in 2023 and 101 in 2024). In 2025, the Rockies obtained the worst start to a season of any team through 39 games, starting off at 6–33 (.154 winning percentage). The Rockies then fell to 30 games below .500, accomplishing that mark in just 44 games. Their record was 7–37, a .159 winning percentage. The Rockies continued their abysmal start to the 2025 season by setting the record for the worst team record through 50 games. Their record of 8–42 (.160 winning percentage) was worst 50 game start of any team in Major League baseball history, two games worse than the 2023 Oakland Athletics 10–40 start (.200 winning percentage). The 2025 Colorado Rockies' 10–50 (.167 winning percentage) record after 60 games eclipsed the 11-49 previous worst 60 game mark held by five teams: the 1886 Washington Nationals, the 1895 Louisville Colonels, the 1897 St. Louis Browns, the 1904 Washington Senators, and the 1932 Boston Red Sox. The Rockies finish, tied with the 2003 Detroit Tigers for the third most losses in baseball history since 1901. They had two less losses than the 2024 Chicago White Sox, and one fewer loss than the 1962 expansion New York Mets. In addition, the Rockies ended the season with the worst modern-era run differential of -424, easily shattering the previously held record by the 1932 Boston Red Sox who had a run differential of -349.

In June 2025, the franchise promoted Walker Monfort, son of owner Dick Monfort, to team president.

== Uniforms ==
One of the Rockies' team colors is purple which was inspired by the line "For purple mountain majesties" in "America the Beautiful". The shades of the color used by the club lacked uniformity until PMS 2685 was established as the official purple beginning with the 2017 season.

The Rockies' home uniform is white with purple pinstripes, and the Rockies are the first team in Major League history to wear purple pinstripes. The front of the uniform has the word "Rockies" in silver trimmed in black, with letters and numerals in black trimmed in silver. During the Rockies' inaugural season, home uniforms lacked names on the back, but names were added for the following season. In 2000, numerals were added to the chest.

The Rockies' road uniform is grey with purple piping. The front of the uniform originally featured the team name in silver trimmed in purple but was changed the next season to purple with white trim. Letters and numerals are in purple with white trim. In 2000, piping was replaced with pinstripes, "Colorado" was emblazoned in front, chest numerals were placed, and black trim was added to the letters. Prior to the 2012 season, the Rockies brought back the purple piping on their road uniforms, but kept the other elements of their 2000 uniform change.

The Rockies originally wore an alternate black uniform during their inaugural 1993 season, but for only a few games. The uniform featured the team name in silver with purple trim, and letters and numerals in purple with white trim. In the 2005 season, the Rockies started wearing black sleeveless alternate uniforms, featuring "Colorado" letters and numerals in silver with purple and white trim. The uniforms also included black undershirts, and for a few games in 2005, purple undershirts. The Rockies retired the black sleeveless uniform in 2022, replacing it with the "City Connect" uniform (see below).

From 2002 to 2011, the Rockies wore alternate versions of their pinstriped white uniform, featuring the interlocking "CR" on the left chest and numerals on the right chest. This design featured sleeves until 2004, when they went with a vest design with black undershirts.

In addition to the black sleeveless alternate uniform, the Rockies also wear a purple alternate uniform, which they first unveiled in the 2000 season. The design featured "Colorado" in silver with black and white trim, and letters and numerals in black with white trim. At the start of the 2012 season, the Rockies introduced "Purple Mondays" in which the team wears its purple uniform every Monday game day, though the team continued to wear them on other days of the week.

Prior to 2019, the Rockies always wore their white pinstriped pants regardless of what uniform top they wore during home games. However, the Rockies have since added alternate white non-pinstriped pants to pair with either their black or purple alternate uniforms at home, as neither uniform contained pinstripes.

The Rockies currently wear an all-black cap with "CR" in purple trimmed in silver and a purple-brimmed variation as an alternate. The team previously wore an all-purple cap with "CR" in black trimmed in silver, and in the 2018 season, caps with the "CR" in silver to commemorate the team's 25th anniversary.

In 2022, the Rockies were one of seven additional teams to release Nike's "City Connect" uniforms. The set was predominantly green and white with printed mountain range motifs adorning the chest. The lettering was taken from the official Colorado license plates. The right sleeve had a yellow patch featuring the shortened nickname "ROX", the "5280" sign representing the altitude of Denver, two black diamonds representing Double Diamond skiing, and the exact longitude and latitude of Coors Field. The left sleeve had the interlocking "CR" in white with green trim, and purple piping was added to represent purple seats at Coors Field. Caps were green with a white panel, featuring a "CO" patch with various Colorado-inspired symbols, including colors from the state flag and mountain ranges. In 2023, the Rockies tweaked their "City Connect" uniform, pairing it with white pants on day games and green pants on night games. Their first "City Connect" uniform was worn until the end of the 2024 season.

The Rockies' second "City Connect" uniform features a split between light blue and purple, paying homage to the transition between day and night over the Rocky Mountains. The jersey features blue skies and purple mountain majesty as the inspirations behind the color palette. Accents all over the uniform, cap, and branding use the red, yellow, and blue of the Colorado state flag. The Denver city flag is also featured on the lining inside the hat. It is the first pullover City Connect jersey.

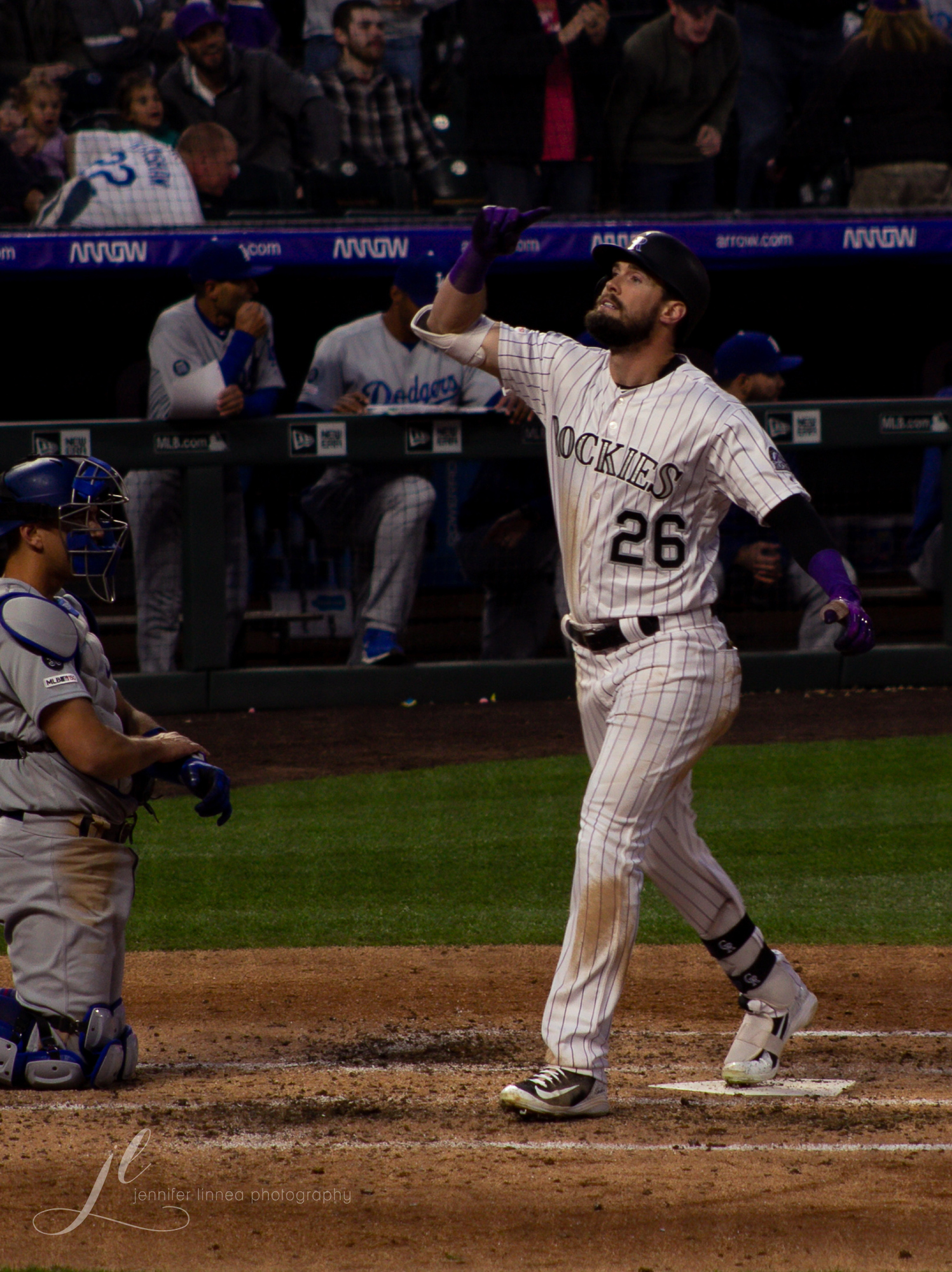
Home white pinstriped uniform, as worn by David Dahl.

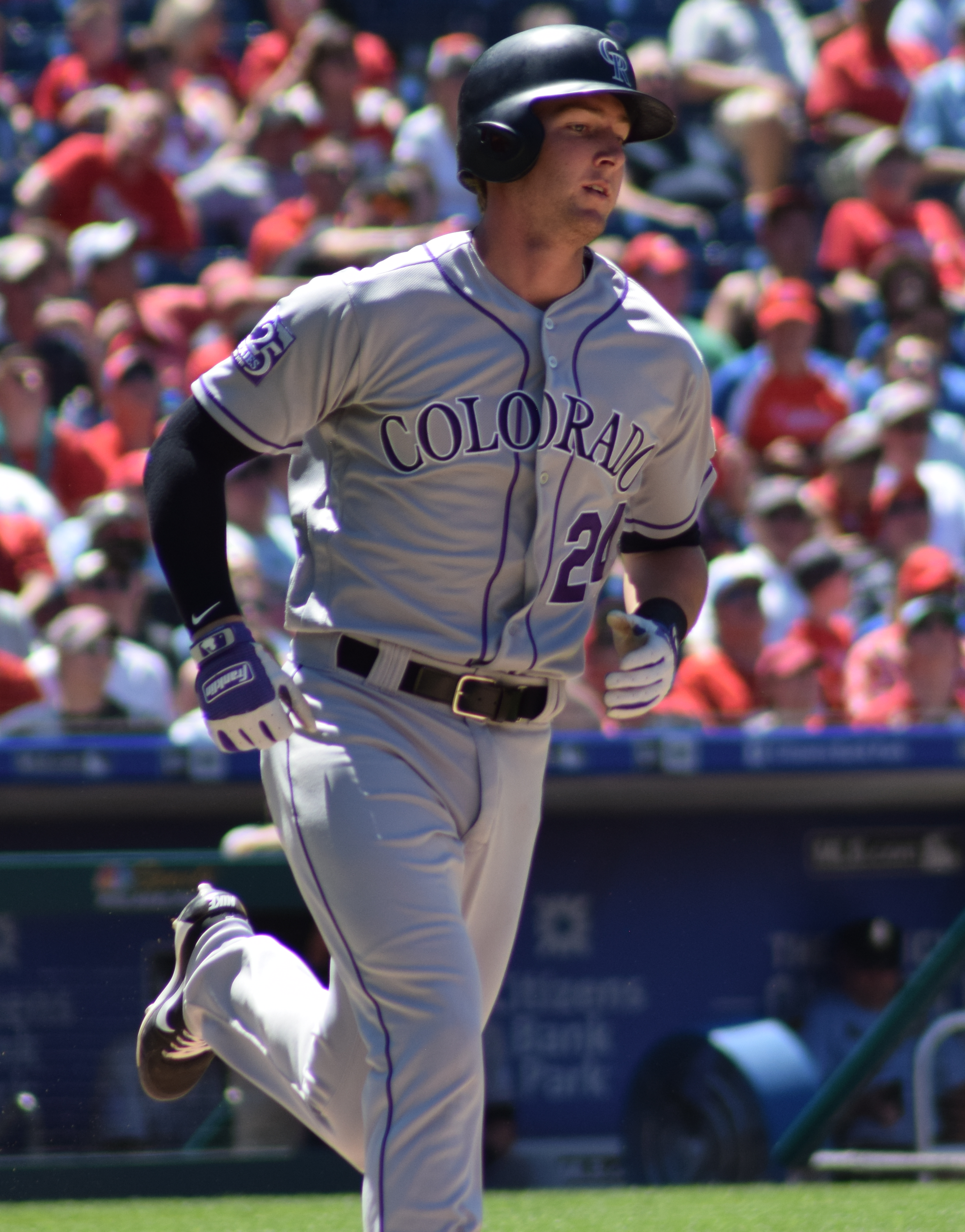
Road grey uniform, as worn by Ryan McMahon.

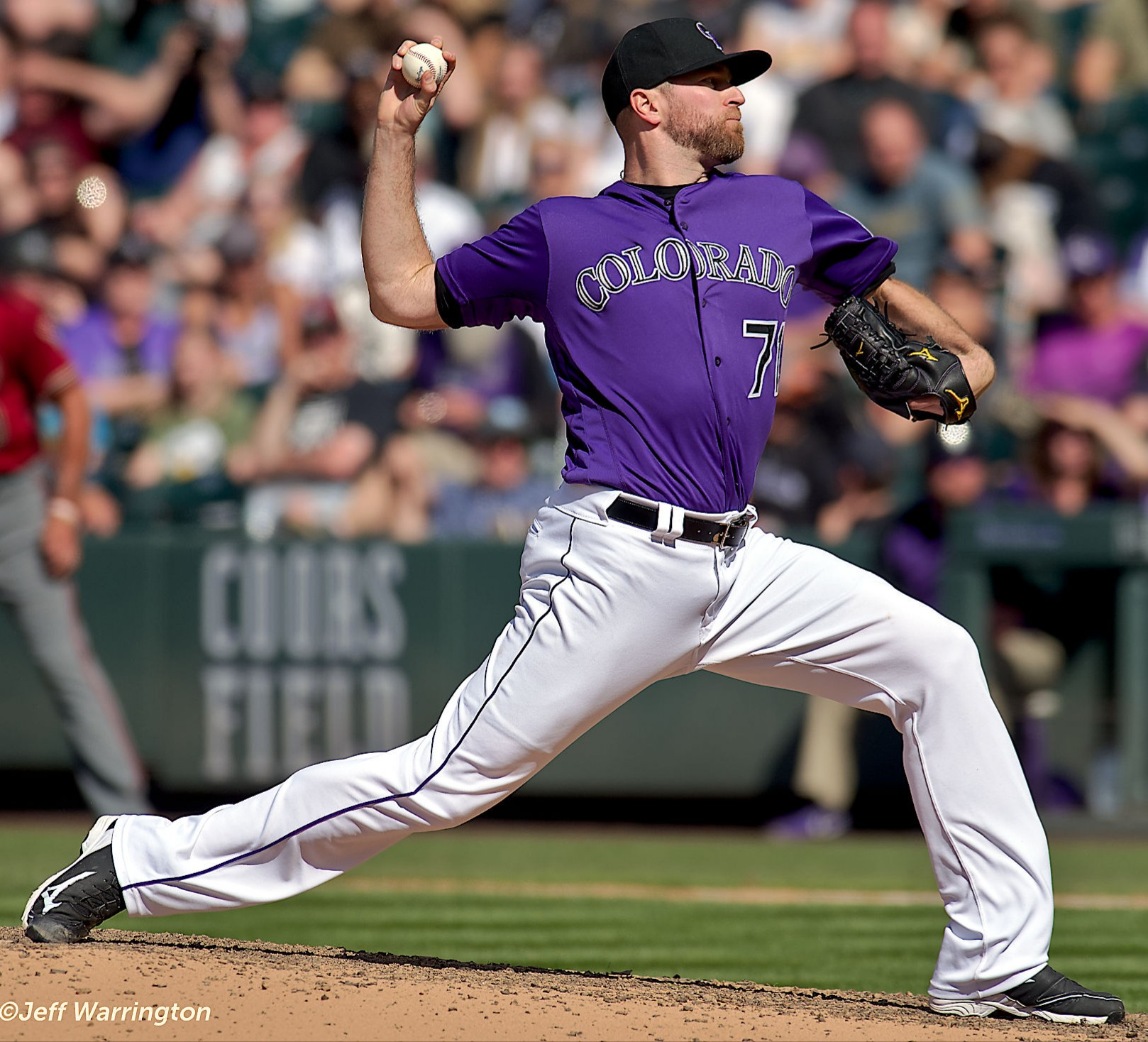
Alternate purple uniform with home white pants, as worn by Wade Davis.

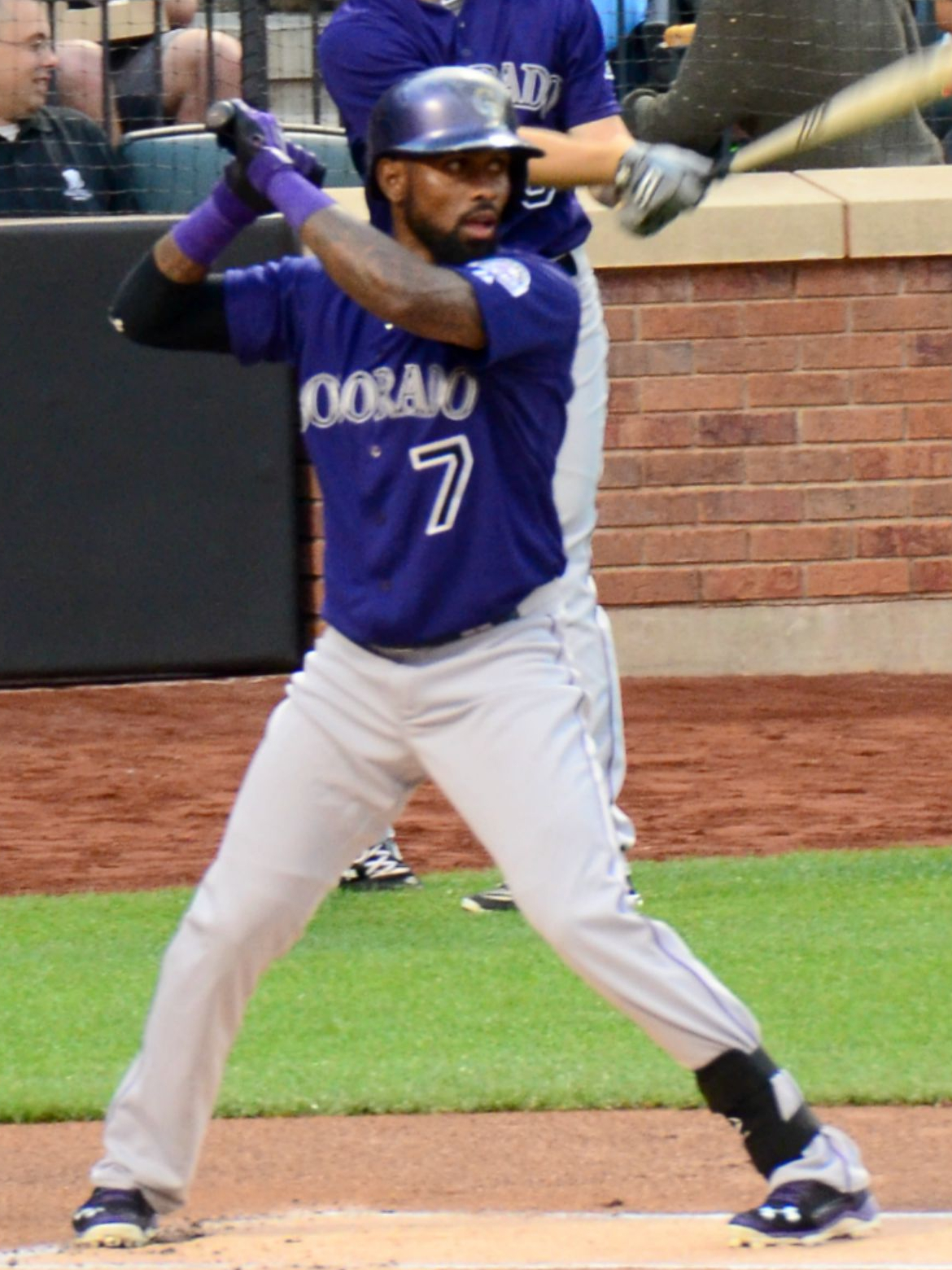
Alternate purple uniform with road grey pants, as worn by José Reyes.

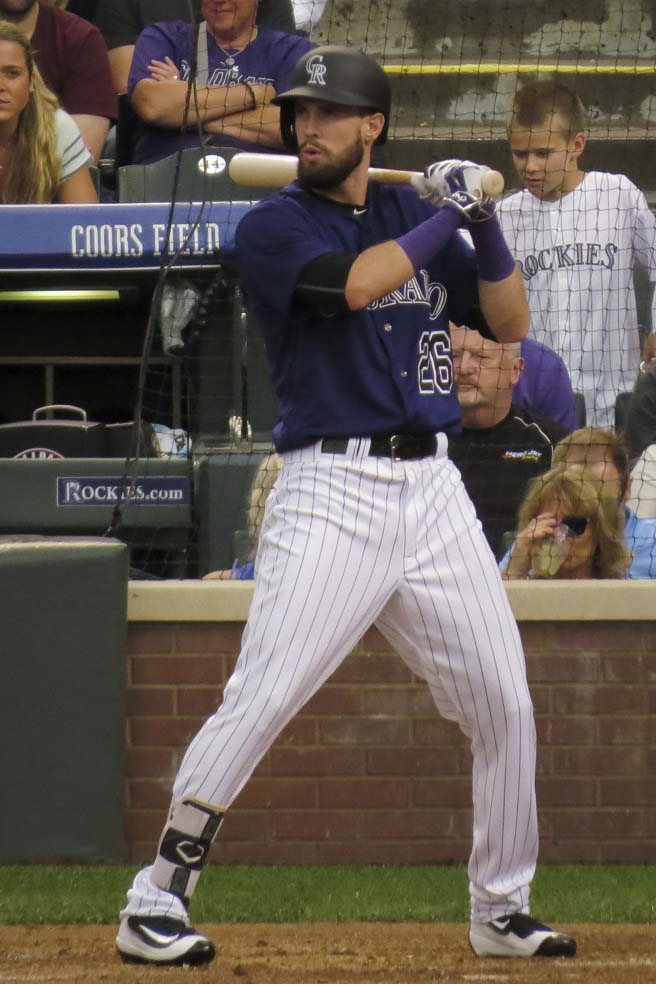
Alternate purple uniform with white pinstriped pants (2000–2018), as worn by David Dahl.

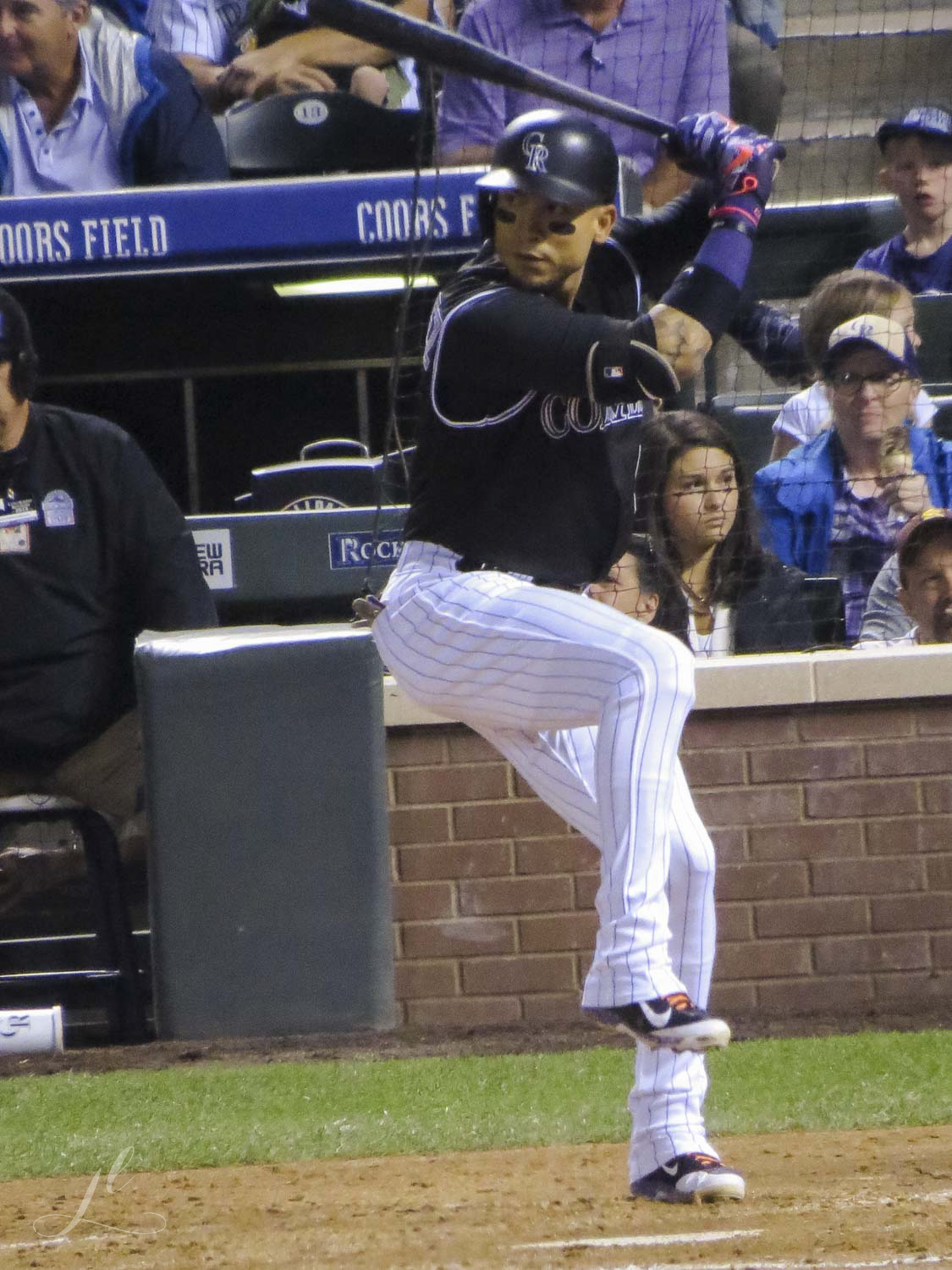
Alternate black vest uniform with white pinstriped pants (2005–2018), as worn by Carlos González.

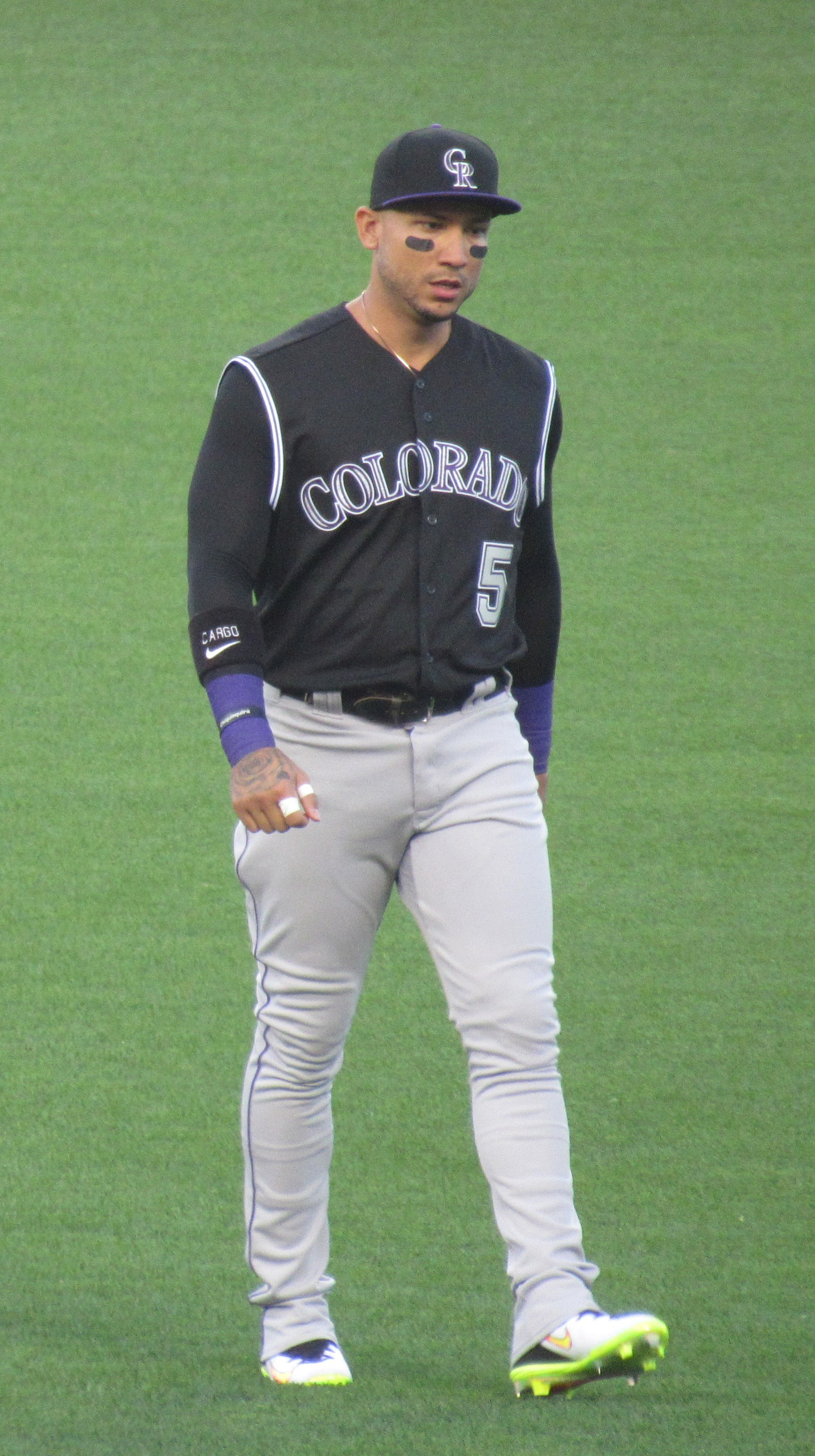
Alternate black vest uniform with black/purple cap and road grey pants (2005–2021), as worn by Carlos González.

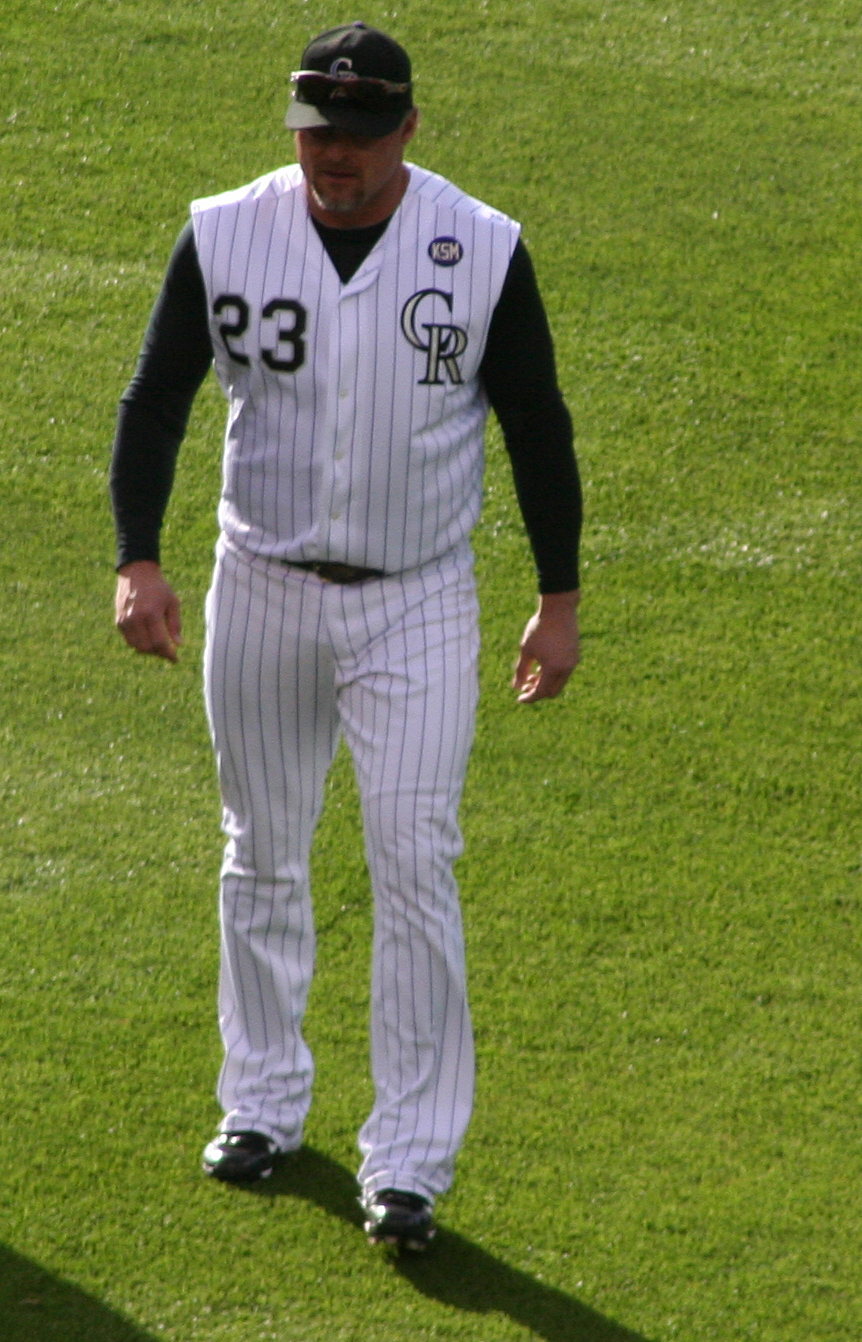
Alternate white pinstriped vest uniform (2004–2011), as worn by Jason Giambi.

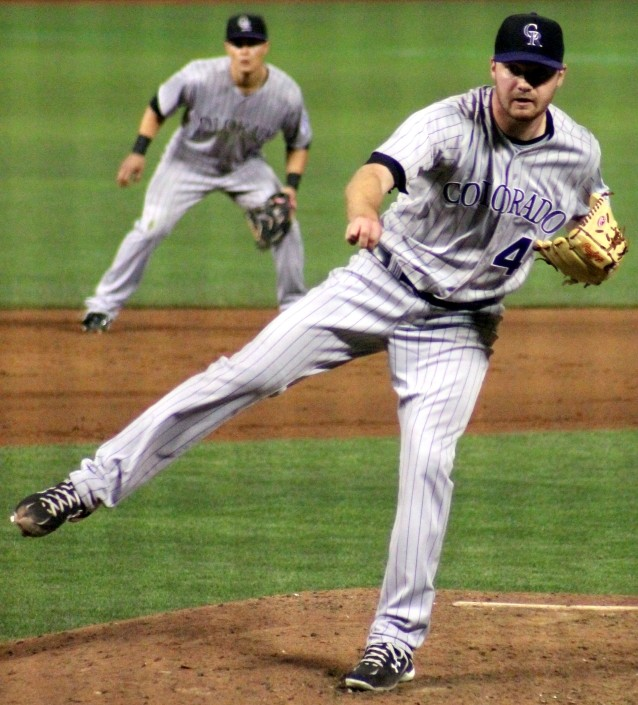
Road grey pinstriped uniform (2000–2011), as worn by Alex White.

== Controversies ==
On June 1, 2006, USA Today reported that Rockies management, including manager Clint Hurdle, had instituted an explicitly Christian code of conduct for the team's players, banning men's magazines (such as Maxim and Playboy) and sexually explicit music from the team's clubhouse. The article sparked controversy, and soon-after The Denver Post published an article featuring many Rockies players contesting the claims made in the USA Today article.

On October 17, 2007, a week before the first game of the 2007 World Series against the Boston Red Sox, the Colorado Rockies announced that tickets were to be available to the general public via online sales only, despite prior arrangements to sell the tickets at local retail outlets. Five days later on October 22, California-based ticket vendor Paciolan, Inc., the sole contractor authorized by the Colorado Rockies to distribute tickets, was forced to suspend sales after less than an hour due to an overwhelming number of attempts to purchase tickets. An official statement from the Rockies claimed that they were the victims of a denial of service attack. These claims, however, were unsubstantiated and neither the Rockies nor Paciolan have sought investigation into the matter. The United States Federal Bureau of Investigation started its own investigation into the claims. Ticket sales resumed the next day, with all three home games selling out within two and a half hours.

In March 2021, Ken Rosenthal and Nick Groke reported in The Athletic that, during the 2020 season, the Rockies had made baseball operations personnel work as clubhouse attendants in addition to their front office duties, resulting in work days lasting up to 17 hours. Former staffers described doing laundry for players while team personnel asked them for scouting and statistical information. The article further described a general atmosphere of dysfunction and unaccountability in Colorado's front office. General manager Jeff Bridich resigned the following month.

On April 10, 2024, during a charter flight on a United Airlines Boeing 757, coach Hensley Meulens posted a video of himself seated in the captain's seat mid-flight, which prompted the Federal Aviation Administration (FAA) to investigate.

== Baseball Hall of Famers ==
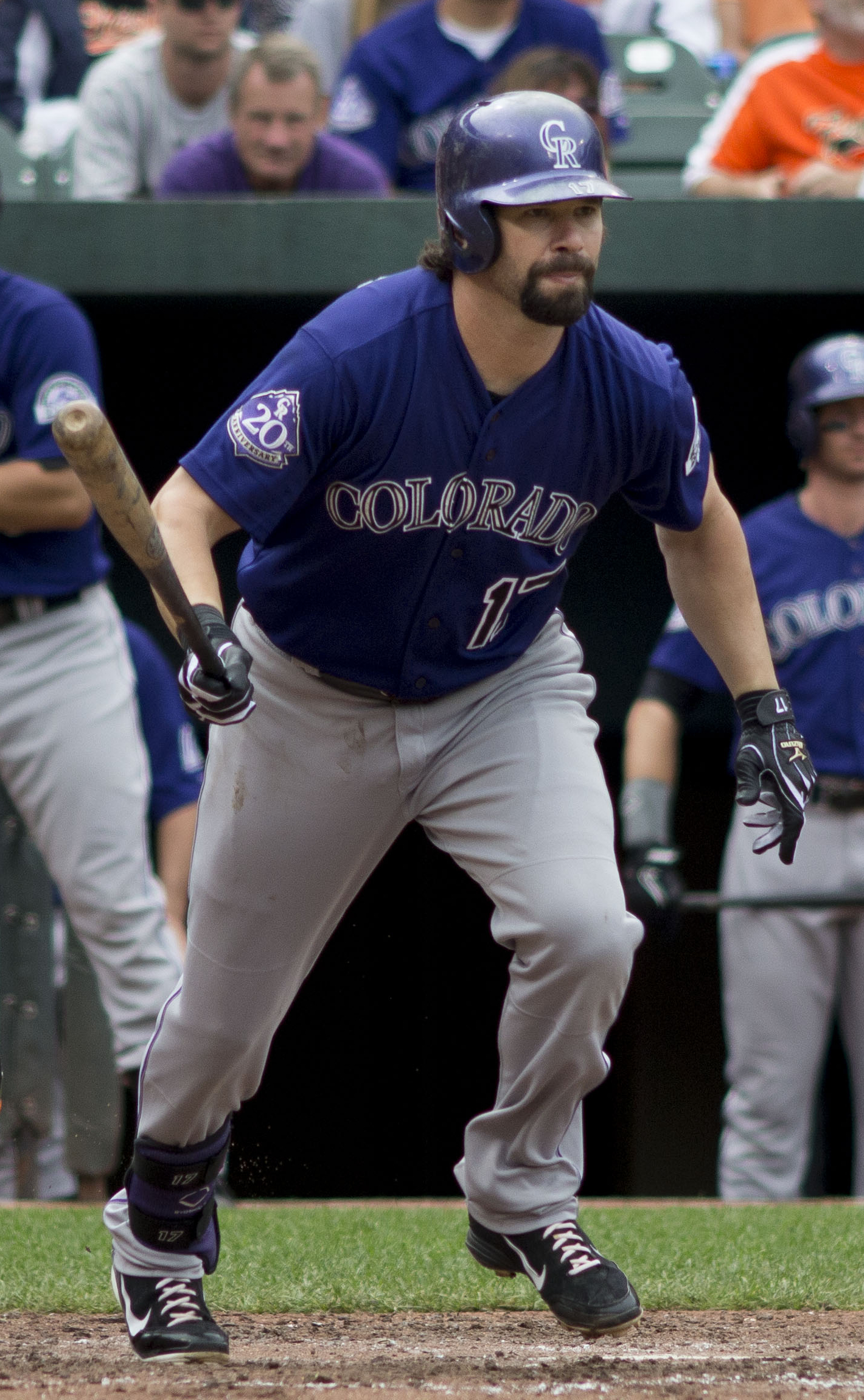
Hall of Fame 1B Todd Helton (1997–2013)

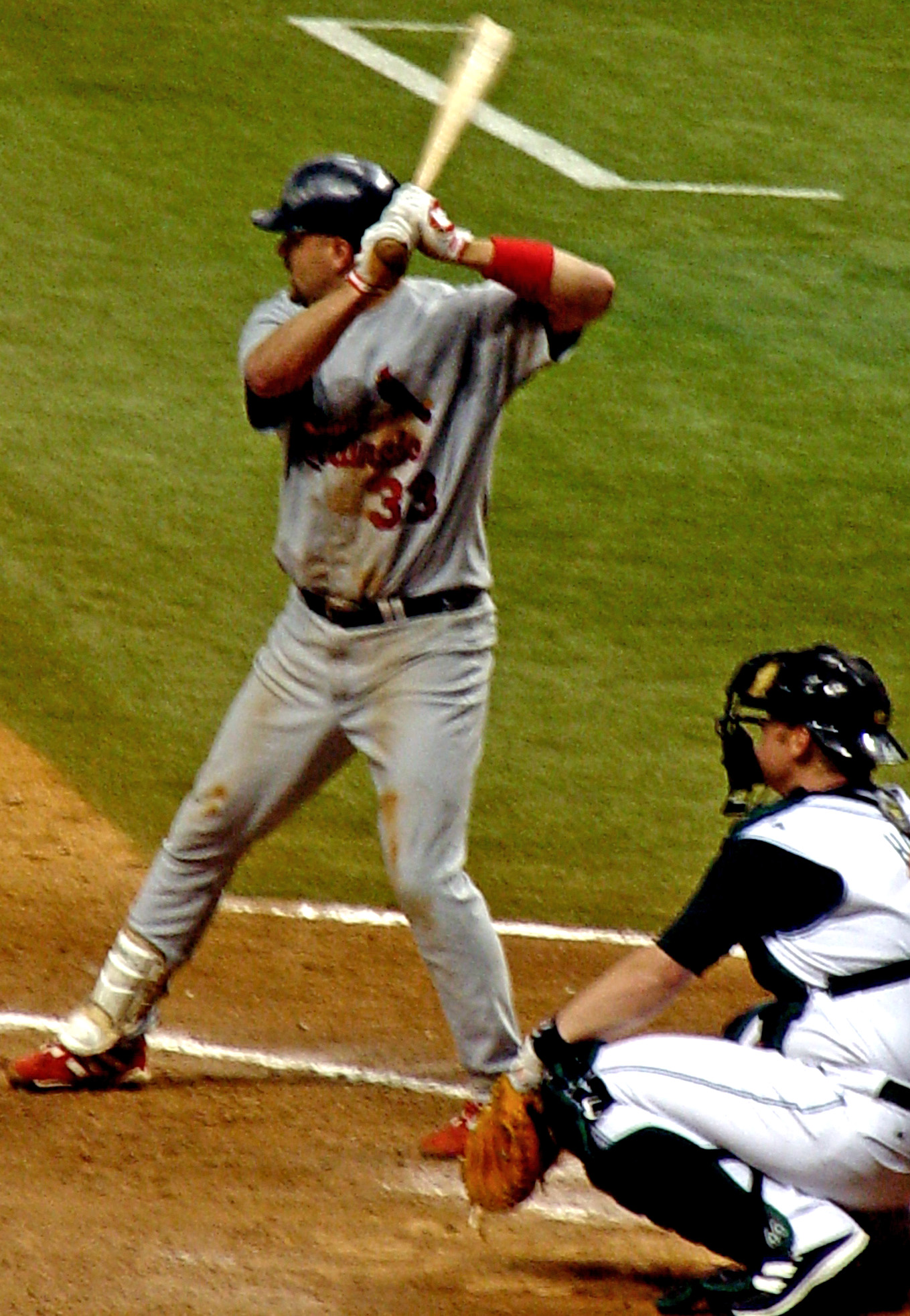
Hall of Famer Larry Walker (1995–2004)

Colorado Rockies Hall of Famers
Affiliation according to the National Baseball Hall of Fame and Museum
Colorado Rockies

**Todd Helton** *

Jim Leyland

**Larry Walker** *

- Players and managers listed in **bold** are depicted on their Hall of Fame plaques wearing a Rockies cap insignia.
- * Colorado Rockies listed as primary team according to the Hall of Fame

=== Colorado Sports Hall of Fame ===
**Colorado Rockies in the Colorado Sports Hall of Fame**
No.	Name	Position(s)	Seasons	Notes
—	Jerry McMorris	Owner	1992–2005	
—	Bob Gebhard	GM	1992–1999	
KSM	Keli McGregor	President	2001–2010	Attended Colorado State University
9, 14	Vinny Castilla	3B	1993–1999; 2004, 2006	
10	Dante Bichette	OF	1993–1999	
14	Andrés Galarraga	1B	1993–1997	
17	Todd Helton	1B	1997–2013	
25	Don Baylor	Manager	1993–1998	
33	Larry Walker	RF	1995–2004	

=== Retired numbers ===
Todd Helton is the first Colorado player to have his number (17) retired, which happened on August 17, 2014.

Jackie Robinson's No. 42 was retired throughout all of baseball in 1997.

Larry Walker, the first member of the Baseball Hall of Fame wearing a Colorado Rockies hat, became the second Colorado player to have his number (33) retired, which occurred in 2021.

Keli McGregor had worked with the Rockies since their inception in 1993, rising from senior director of operations to team president in 2002, until his death on April 20, 2010. He is honored at Coors Field alongside Helton, Walker, and Robinson with his initials.

Todd
Helton
1B
Retired August 17, 2014
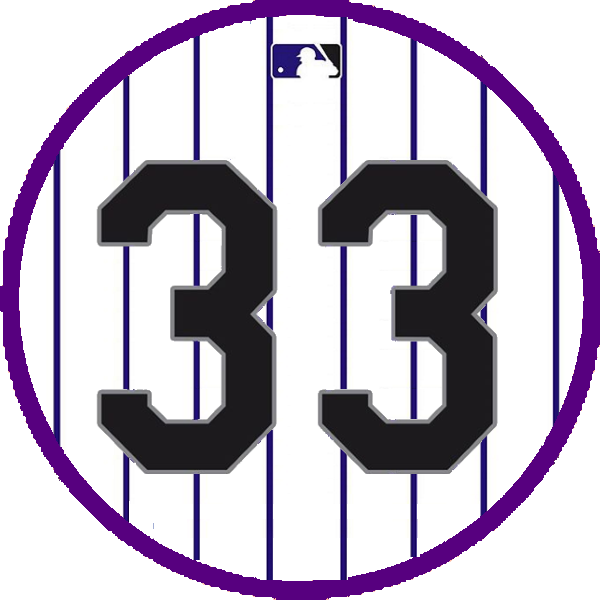
Larry
Walker
RF
Retired September 25, 2021
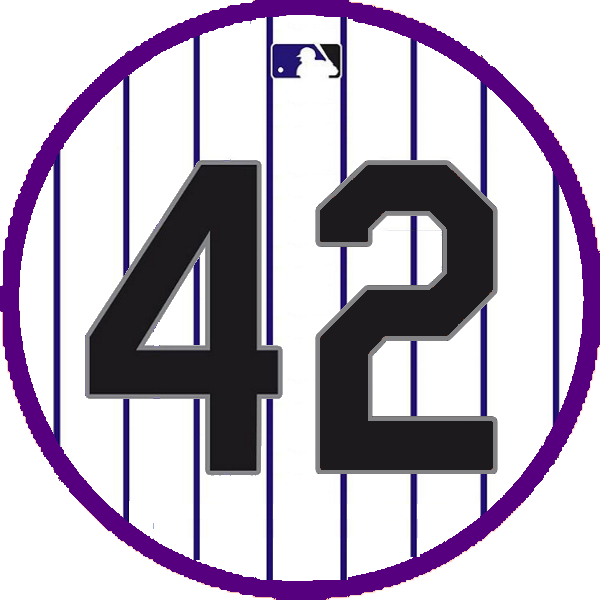
Jackie
Robinson
All MLB
Honored April 15, 1997
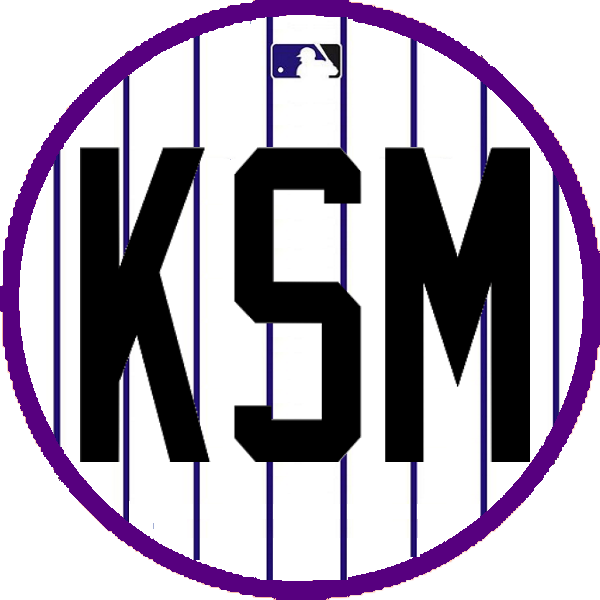
Keli
McGregor
President
Honored September 28, 2010

==== Out of circulation, but not retired ====
The Rockies have not re-issued Carlos Gonzalez's number 5 since he left the team after 2018.

== Individual awards ==
=== NL MVP ===
- 1997 – Larry Walker

=== NLCS MVP ===
- 2007 – Matt Holliday

=== NL Rookie of the Year ===
- 2002 – Jason Jennings

=== NL Comeback Player of the Year ===
- 2017 – Greg Holland
- 2020 – Daniel Bard

=== Silver Slugger Award ===
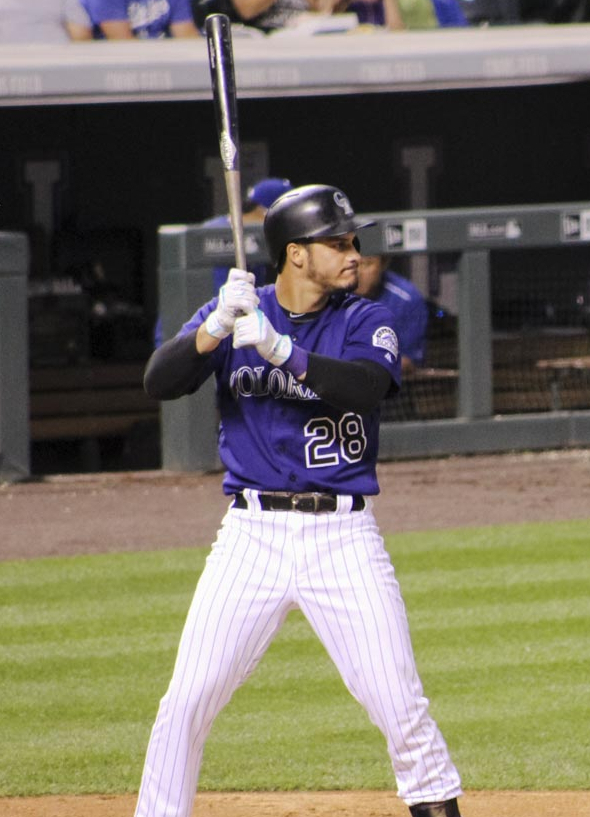
5× All-Star Nolan Arenado (2013–2020)

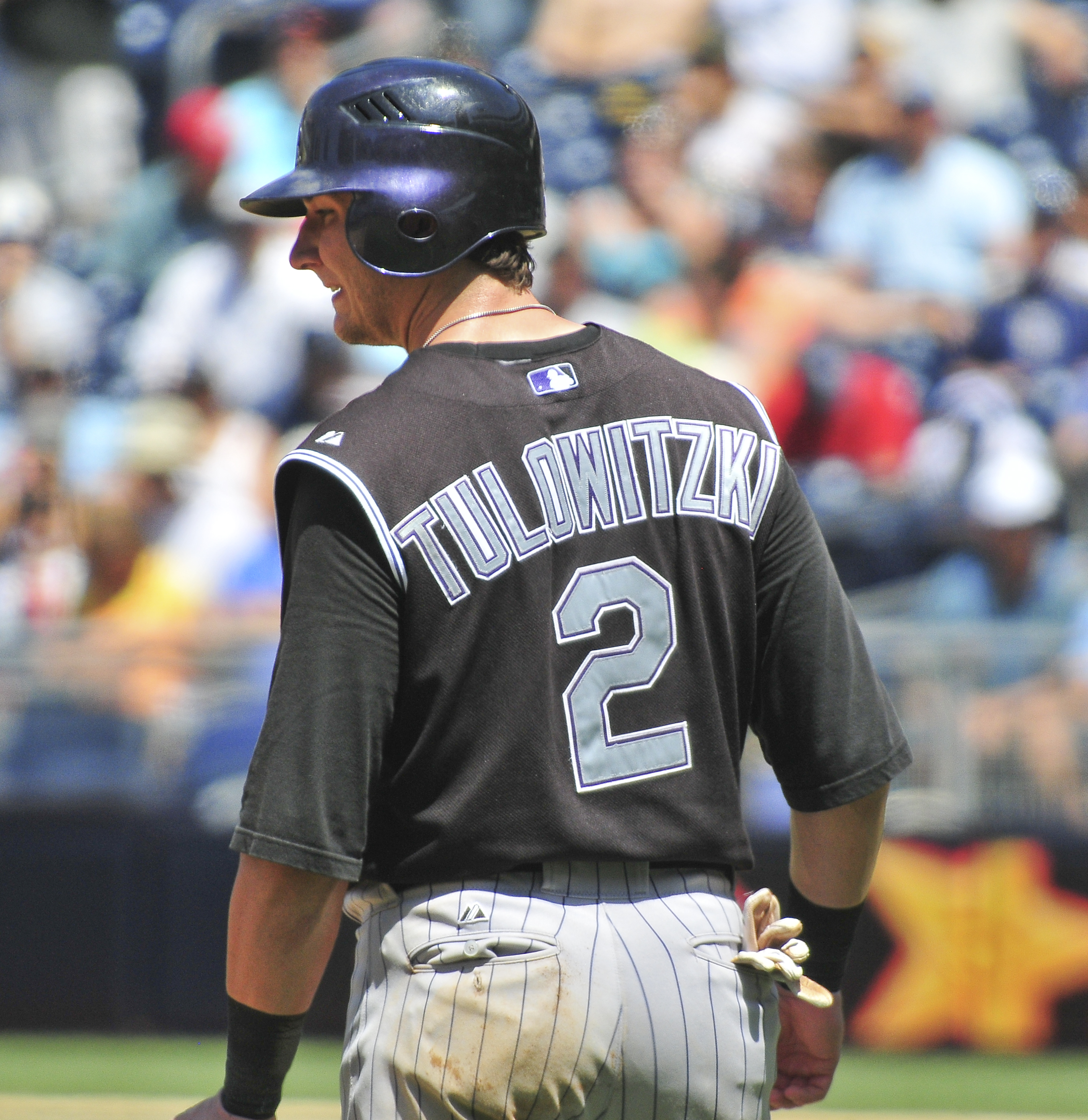
SS Troy Tulowitzki (2006–2015) was 5× All-Star in his tenure in Denver

- Dante Bichette (1995)
- Vinny Castilla (1995, 1997–1998)
- Andrés Galarraga (1996)
- Eric Young (1996)
- Ellis Burks (1996)
- Larry Walker (1997, 1999)
- Mike Hampton (2001–2002)
- Todd Helton (2000–2003)
- Matt Holliday (2006–2008)
- Carlos González (2010, 2015)
- Troy Tulowitzki (2010–2011)
- Michael Cuddyer (2013)
- Nolan Arenado (2015–2018)
- Charlie Blackmon (2016–2017)
- Trevor Story (2018–2019)
- Germán Márquez (2018)
- Hunter Goodman (2025)

=== Hank Aaron Award ===
- 2000 – Todd Helton

=== Gold Glove Award ===
First base:

- Todd Helton (2001–2002, 2004)

Second base:

- DJ LeMahieu (2014, 2017–2018)
- Brendan Rodgers (2022)

Shortstop:

- Neifi Pérez (2000)
- Troy Tulowitzki (2010–2011)
- Ezequiel Tovar (2024)

Third base:

- Nolan Arenado (2013–2020)

Outfield:

- Larry Walker (1997–1999, 2001–2002)
- Carlos González (2010, 2012–2013)
- Brenton Doyle (2023–2024)

=== Manager of the Year Award ===
- 1995 – Don Baylor
- 2009 – Jim Tracy

=== NL Batting Champion ===
- Andrés Galarraga (1993)
- Larry Walker (1998, 1999, 2001)
- Todd Helton (2000)
- Matt Holliday (2007)
- Carlos González (2010)
- Michael Cuddyer (2013)
- Justin Morneau (2014)
- DJ LeMahieu (2016)
- Charlie Blackmon (2017)

=== DHL Hometown Heroes (2006) ===
- Larry Walker – voted by MLB fans as the most outstanding player in the history of the franchise, based on on-field performance, leadership quality and character value

== Team award ==
- 2007 – Warren Giles Trophy (National League champion)
- 2007 – Baseball America Organization of the Year

== Championships ==
National League Champions
Preceded by: St. Louis Cardinals	2007	Succeeded by: Philadelphia Phillies
National League Wild Card Winners
Preceded by: None (First)	1995	Succeeded by: Los Angeles Dodgers
Preceded by: Los Angeles Dodgers	2007	Succeeded by: Milwaukee Brewers
Preceded by: Milwaukee Brewers	2009	Succeeded by: Atlanta Braves
Preceded by: Arizona Diamondbacks	2018	Succeeded by: Washington Nationals
National League Wild Card Runner-Up
	2017	

== Rivalries ==
The Rockies have clashed in divisional matchups with the Los Angeles Dodgers and San Francisco Giants particularly as both teams often thwarted the Rockies' postseason ambitions by winning the division. The Rockies have never won the NL West while the Dodgers and Giants have combined for 21 division titles since the Rockies began play in 1993.

=== Arizona Diamondbacks ===
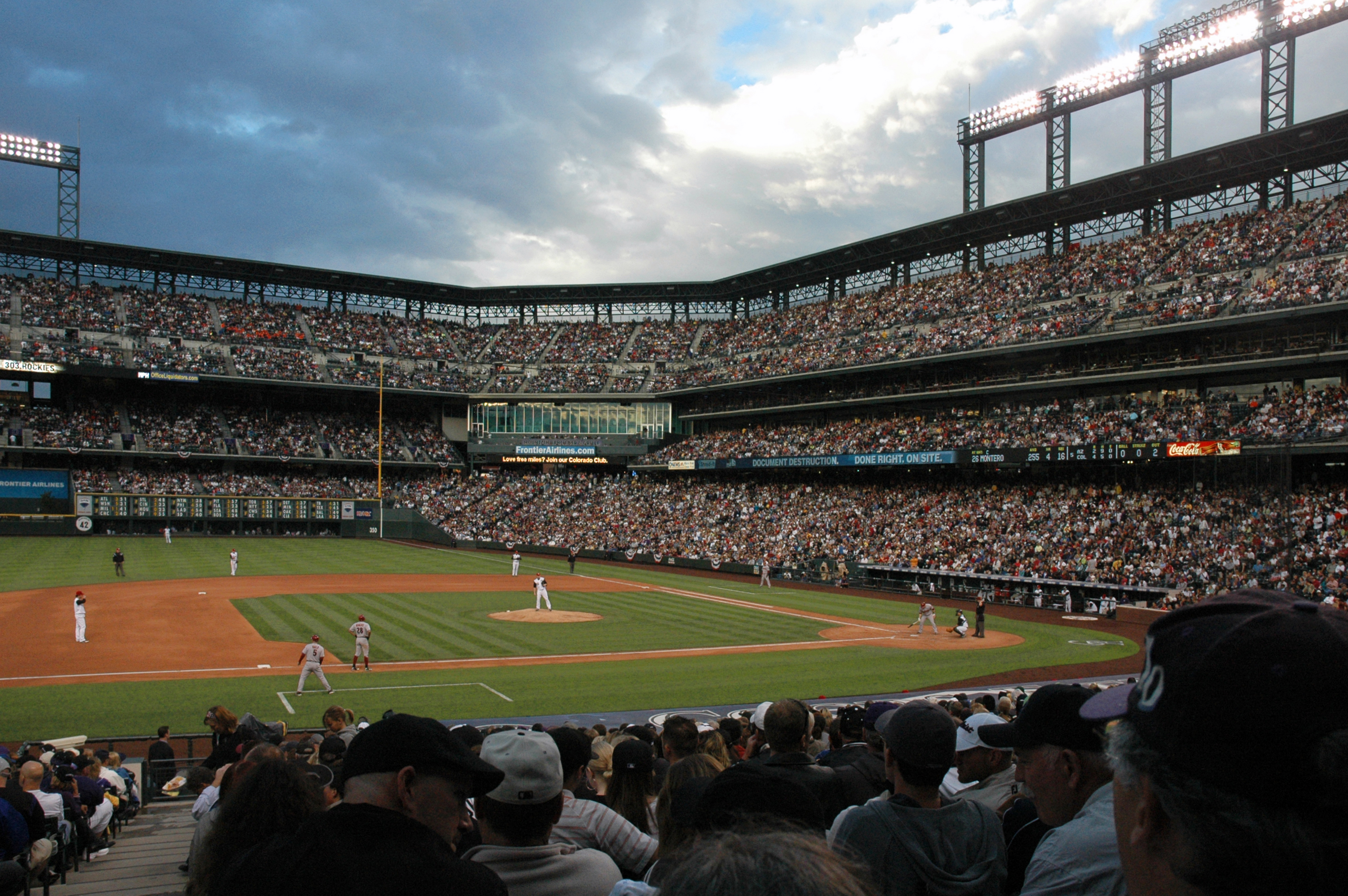
Rockies-Diamondbacks 4th of July game, 2009

The Rockies developed an on-and-off rivalry with the Arizona Diamondbacks, often attributed to both teams being the newest in the division. Colorado had joined the NL West in 1993, while the Diamondbacks are the newest team in the league; founded in 1998. The two teams have met twice in the postseason; notably during the 2007 National League Championship Series, which saw the Rockies enter the postseason as a wild card, and went on to upset the division champion Diamondbacks in a sweep en route to the franchise's lone World Series appearance. The two teams met again in the 2017 National League Wild Card Game, which Arizona won.

== Roster ==
Colorado Rockies 2027 spring training roster
40-man roster		Non-roster invitees	Coaches / other
Pitchers: 38 Mason Adams; 36 Zach Agnos; 83 Brennan Bernardino; 51 McCade Brown; 63 Blas Castaño; -- Jackson Cox; 46 Jeff Criswell; 32 Chase Dollander; 18 Ryan Feltner; 41 Nick Frasso; 29 Tanner Gordon; -- Hayden Harris; 44 Jimmy Herget; 59 Welinton Herrera; 0 Jaden Hill; 43 Gabriel Hughes; -- Jack Mahoney; 54 Mark Manfredi; 47 Juan Mejía; 85 Sean Sullivan	Catchers: -- Bryant Betancourt; 37 Braxton Fulford; 15 Hunter Goodman; 26 Brett Sullivan; Infielders: 1 Adael Amador; 3 Willi Castro; 12 Kyle Karros; 35 Connor Norby; 8 Ryan Ritter; 7 T. J. Rumfield; 14 Ezequiel Tovar; Outfielders: 27 Jordan Beck; 16 Cole Carrigg; 20 Troy Johnston; 31 Jake McCarthy; 22 Mickey Moniak; 30 Sterlin Thompson; 13 Zac Veen; Designated hitters: 23 Kris Bryant		Manager: 4 Warren Schaeffer; Coaches: 50 Doug Bernier (first base/outfield); 73 Matt Buschmann (bullpen); 75 Kyle Cunningham (asst. bullpen catcher); 53 Ronnie Gideon (asst. bench); 70 Andy González (third base); -- Ethan Katz (pitching); 74 Jordan Pacheco (asst. hitting); 61 Jeff Pickler (bench); 72 Brett Pill (hitting); 76 Chris Rabago (bullpen catcher); 79 Gabe Ribas (asst. pitching); 39 active, 0 inactive, 0 non-roster invitees; 7-, 10-, or 15-day injured list; * Not on active roster; ^{†} Suspended list; Roster, coaches, and NRIs updated November 17, 2026; Transactions • Depth chart; → All MLB rosters

== Home attendance ==
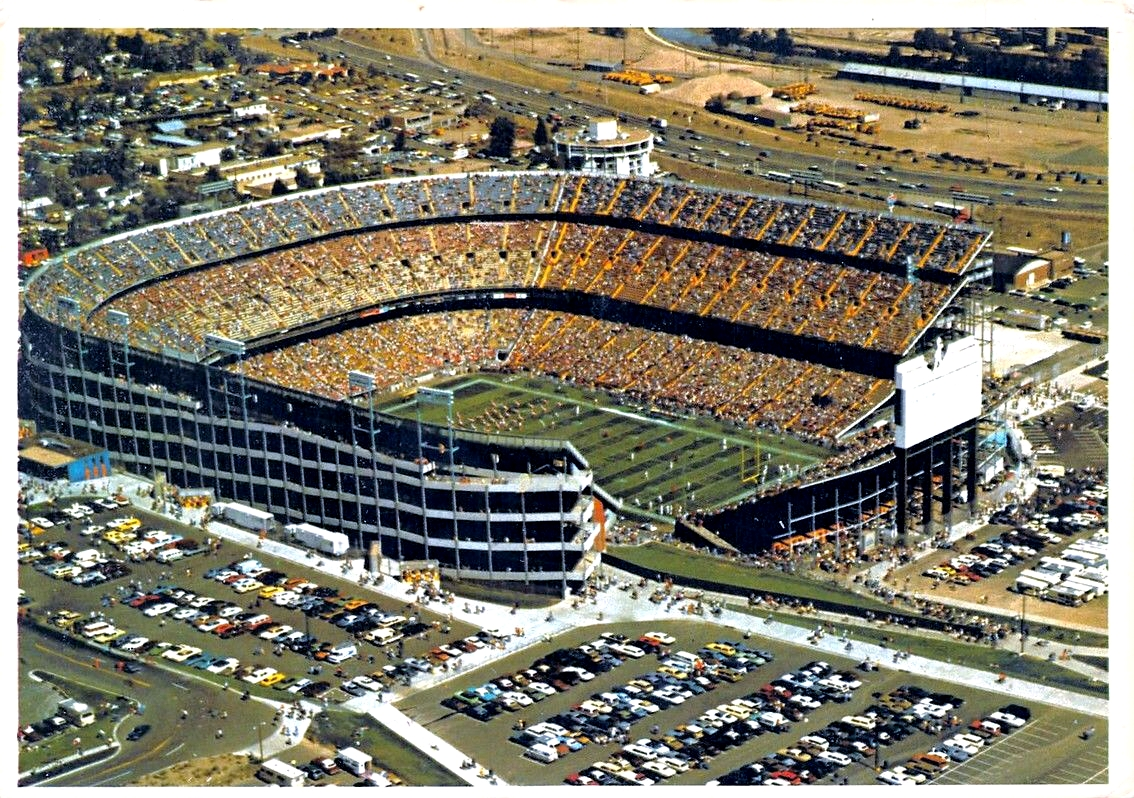
Mile High Stadium (1993–1994)

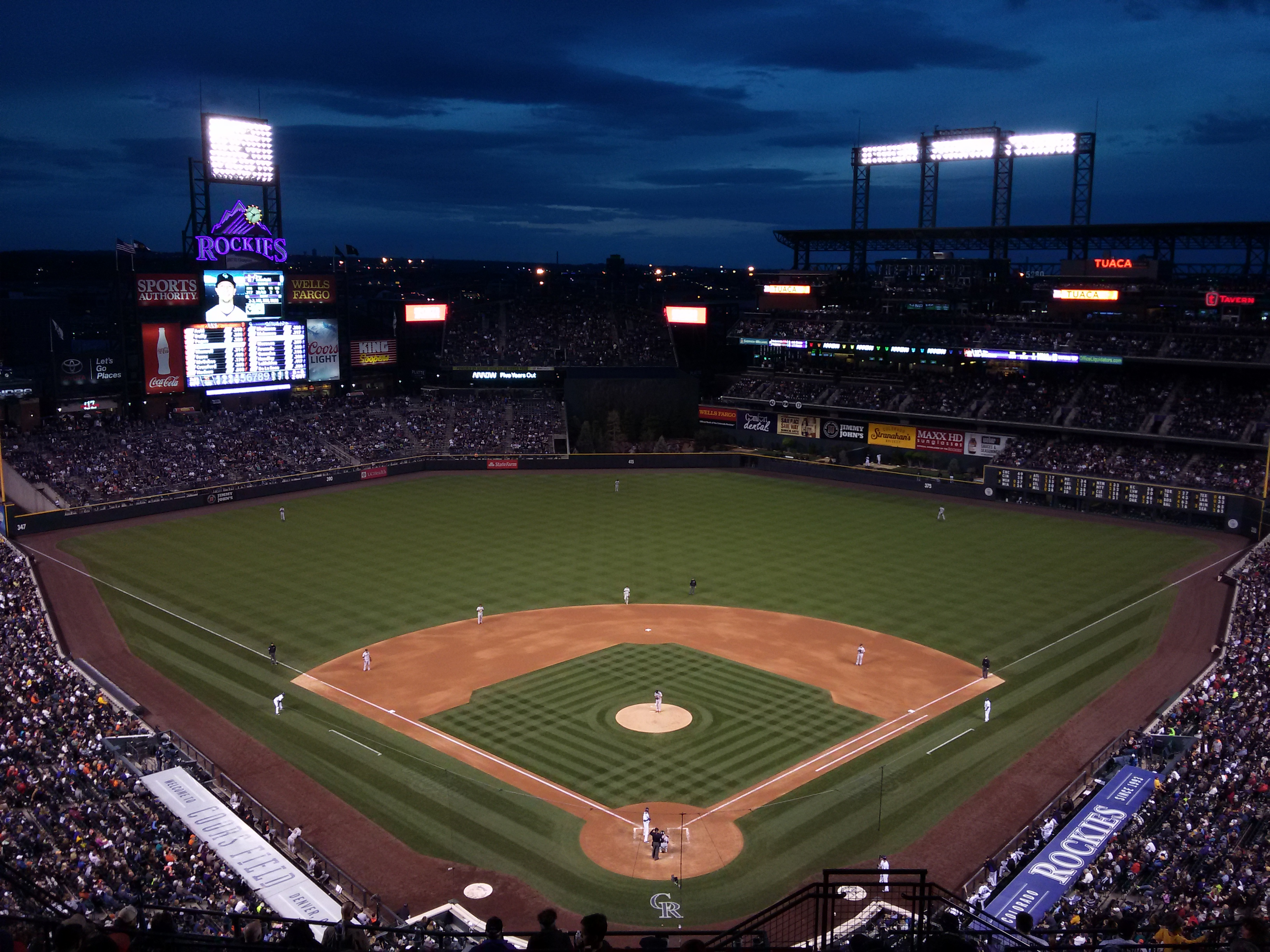
Coors Field (1995–present)

The Rockies led MLB attendance records for the first seven years of their existence. The inaugural season is currently the MLB all-time record for home attendance.

Home Attendance at Mile High Stadium
Year	Total Attendance	Game Average	League Rank
1993	4,483,350	55,350	1st
1994	3,281,511	57,570+	1st

Home Attendance at Coors Field
Year	Total Attendance	Game Average	League Rank
1995	3,390,037	47,084++	1st
1996	3,891,014	48,037	1st
1997	3,888,453	48,006	1st
1998	3,792,683	46,823	1st
1999	3,481,065	42,976	1st
2000	3,295,129	40,681	3rd
2001	3,166,821	39,097	2nd
2002	2,737,838	33,800	6th
2003	2,334,085	28,816	9th
2004	2,338,069	28,865	9th
2005	1,914,389	23,634	14th
2006	2,104,362	28,979	11th
2007	2,650,218	32,719	9th
2008	2,665,080	32,902	8th
2009	2,875,245	35,497	6th
2010	2,909,777	35,923	7th
2011	2,630,458	32,475	7th
2012	2,793,828	34,492	5th
2013	2,680,329	33,090	5th
2014	2,506,789	30,948	8th
2015	2,602,524	32,130	6th
2016	2,953,650	36,465	5th
2017	2,048,138	25,286	11th
2018	3,015,880	37,233	5th
2019	2,993,244	36,954	4th
2020	No attendance due to COVID-19 pandemic		
2021	1,938,645	24,854	7th
2022	2,597,428	32,467	9th
2023	2,607,935	32,196	7th
2024	2,540,195	31,360	8th
2025	2,404,613	29,687	16th

+ = 57 home games in strike shortened season. ++ = 72 home games in strike shortened season.

== Minor league affiliations ==
The Colorado Rockies farm system consists of seven minor league affiliates.

Class	Team	League	Location	Ballpark	Affiliated
Triple-A	Albuquerque Isotopes	Pacific Coast League	Albuquerque, New Mexico	Rio Grande Credit Union Field at Isotopes Park	2015
Double-A	Hartford Yard Goats	Eastern League	Hartford, Connecticut	Dunkin' Park	2015
High-A	Spokane Indians	Northwest League	Spokane Valley, Washington	Avista Stadium	2021
Single-A	Fresno Grizzlies	California League	Fresno, California	Chukchansi Park	2021
Rookie	ACL Rockies	Arizona Complex League	Scottsdale, Arizona	Salt River Fields at Talking Stick	2021
Rookie	DSL Colorado	Dominican Summer League	Boca Chica, Santo Domingo	Colorado Rockies Complex	2018
Rookie	DSL Rockies	Dominican Summer League	Boca Chica, Santo Domingo	Colorado Rockies Complex	1997

== Radio and television ==
Colorado Rockies games are produced by MLB Network and televised locally on Rockies.TV, a streaming service with no blackouts that is available with MLB.tv for $199.99 a year or $39.99 a month, or without MLB.tv for $99.99 a year or $19.99 a month. Games air on the following cable providers and networks:

- DirecTV/DirecTV Stream (CH. 683)
- Xfinity/Comcast (CH. 1262)
- Spectrum (Colorado and Wyoming) (CH. 130 or CH. 445)
- Spectrum (Gunnison and Telluride) (CH. 305 or CH. 445)
- Spectrum (Lincoln) (CH. 435 or CH. 445)

Jeff Huson and Drew Goodman are the usual TV broadcast team, with Ryan Spilborghs and Kelsey Wingert handling on-field coverage and clubhouse interviews. Jason Hirsh and Cory Sullivan host the pre-game and post-game shows. Corrigan, Spilborghs, and Sullivan also fill in as play-by-play or color commentator during absences of Huson or Goodman. From 1997 to 2023, most regular season games were produced and televised by AT&T SportsNet Rocky Mountain.

The Rockies' flagship radio station is KOA 850AM, with some late-season games broadcast on KHOW 630 AM due to conflicts with Denver Broncos games. The Rockies Radio Network is composed of 38 affiliate stations in five states.

Jack Corrigan and Jerry Schemmel are the radio announcers, serving as a backup TV announcer whenever Goodman is not available.

In January 2020, long-time KOA radio announcer Jerry Schemmel was let go from his role for budgetary reasons from KOA's parent company. He returned in 2022, replacing Mike Rice, who reportedly refused the COVID-19 vaccine.

Spanish language radio broadcasts of the Rockies are heard on KNRV 1150 AM.

Awards and achievements
Preceded by St. Louis Cardinals; 2006	National League champions 2007	Succeeded by Philadelphia Phillies; 2008
