= Hartford Yard Goats =

Minor League Baseball team in Hartford, Connecticut

- Founded in 2016; Hartford, Connecticut

Team logo	Cap insignia

Minor league affiliations
- Class: Double-A (1983–present)
- League: Eastern League (1983–present)
- Division: Northeast Division

Major league affiliations
- Team: Colorado Rockies (2015–present)
- Previous teams: Minnesota Twins (1995–2014); Boston Red Sox (1973–1994)

Minor league titles
- League titles (5): 1975; 1978; 1981; 1983; 2001 (Co-Champion)
- Division titles (2): 1998; 2001
- First-half titles (2): 2024; 2026

Team data
- Name: Hartford Yard Goats
- Previous names: New Britain Rock Cats (1997–2015); Hardware City Rock Cats (1995–1996); New Britain Red Sox (1983–1994); Bristol Red Sox (1973–1982); Pawtucket Red Sox (1970–1972); Pittsfield Red Sox (1965–1969); Reading Red Sox (1935–1968)
- Colors: Royal blue, kelly green, tan, white
- Mascot: Chompers and Chew Chew
- Ballpark: Dunkin' Park (2017–present)
- Previous parks: Senator Thomas J. Dodd Memorial Stadium (2016); New Britain Stadium (1996–2015); Beehive Field (1983–1995); Muzzy Field (1973–1982)
- Owner/ Operator: Josh Solomon
- General manager: Mike Abramson
- Manager: Robinson Cancel
- Website: milb.com/hartford

The Hartford Yard Goats are a Minor League Baseball team based in Hartford, Connecticut. The Yard Goats, which play in the Eastern League, are the Double-A affiliate of the Colorado Rockies. The team was founded in 2016 when the New Britain Rock Cats relocated to Hartford. The Yard Goats' home stadium is Dunkin' Park.

== History ==
The franchise's timeline can be traced back to Pittsfield, Massachusetts, where they were a Boston Red Sox Double-A affiliate from 1965 to 1969. The franchise then moved to Pawtucket, Rhode Island, in 1970, where they spent three years. The Pawtucket Red Sox became a Triple-A team in 1973, and the Red Sox moved their Double-A franchise to Bristol, Connecticut. Known as the Bristol Red Sox, the team played at Muzzy Field for ten seasons from 1973 to 1982. Starting with the 1983 season, the team was moved 7 miles (11 km) east to New Britain, Connecticut. Then known as the New Britain Red Sox, the team played its home games at Beehive Field, which stood next to New Britain Stadium. Renamed the Rock Cats in 1997, the team remained in New Britain through the 2015 season. In 2016, the team moved to Hartford and became the Yard Goats.

The Yard Goats were unable to play any games in Hartford in 2016 due to construction delays at Dunkin' Park, and instead played all of their home games on the road. These delays resulted in a lawsuit between the city of Hartford and Centerplan, the park's developer. Both sides later agreed to mediation. After the city called an insurance bond with Arch Insurance, the firm replaced Centerplan with Whiting-Turner which resumed construction in October 2016. The new developer completed the ballpark for the team's 2017 home opener on April 13, which they lost to the New Hampshire Fisher Cats, 7-2.

The name "Yard Goats" was selected as part of a "Name the Team" contest, which drew over 6,000 submissions. "Yard goat" is a nickname for a switcher, a locomotive used primarily in a railroad yard to move and organize rolling stock. The stadium is adjacent to Hartford Yard. The logo features a goat chomping on a baseball bat, and the team makes heavy use of animal imagery and symbolism. The blue and green colors are a nod to the Hartford Whalers team that played in the National Hockey League from 1979 to 1997. The team stages an annual Whalers Reunion weekend, with special uniforms resembling the hockey club's, and the logo has the goat chomping a hockey stick. The logo font replicates that used by the former New York, New Haven, and Hartford Railroad.

In conjunction with Major League Baseball's restructuring of Minor League Baseball in 2021, the Yard Goats were organized into the Double-A Northeast. In 2022, the Double-A Northeast became known as the Eastern League, the name historically used by the regional circuit prior to the 2021 reorganization.

In 2024, the Yard Goats clinched their first playoff berth since relocating to Hartford in 2016. The Yard Goats are set to play one game in the 2025 season as the "Hartford Leaf Peepers".

== Mascots ==
The team has two mascots, a green male goat named Chompers and a blue female goat named Chew Chew. The names were selected as part of a "Name the Mascot" contest and refer to the team logo, which features a goat chewing on a baseball bat. Chew Chew's name is also a pun on "choo choo," an onomatopoeia for a steam locomotive, particularly its whistle.

On April 21, 2016, Hartford Police reported that an individual had tackled Chompers outside the Connecticut Science Center after an event there. The man inside the costume, who was not named, was uninjured. Police are unsure whether it was an intentional assault or a prank that went too far.

== Broadcasts ==
Hartford Yard Goats games are heard on AM 1410 WPOP in English and were formerly heard on AM 1120 WPRX in Spanish.

== Season records ==
Legend
Place	Playoffs
Division champions	Won championship series
Made playoffs	Lost championship series

Results by season
Year	W–L	Pct.	Place*	Manager	Playoffs
2016	74–67	.525	3rd	Darin Everson	
2017	62–77	.446	5th	Jerry Weinstein	
2018	65–71	.478	3rd	Warren Schaeffer	
2019	73–66	.525	3rd	Warren Schaeffer	
2020	Season cancelled due to COVID-19 pandemic				
2021	39–79	.331	6th	Chris Denorfia	
2022	77–60	.562	2nd	Chris Denorfia	
2023	57–76	.429	6th	Chris Denorfia	
2024	76–60	.559	2nd	Bobby Meacham	Lost to Somerset Patriots in Divisional Round, 0-2
2025	69–68	.504	3rd	Bobby Meacham	
2026	66–71	.482	4th	Robinson Cancel	Lost to Reading Fightin Phils in Divisional Round, 0-2

* Place indicates finish in Eastern/Northeast Division.

== Roster ==
Hartford Yard Goats roster
Players	Coaches/Other
Pitchers: 31 Nathan Blasick; 35 Jackson Cox; 36 Cade Denton; 25 Konner Eaton; 53 Stu Flesland III; 54 Kyle Freeland * #; 23 Bryson Hammer; 50 Fisher Jameson; 13 Victor Juarez; 26 Hunter Mann; 50 Jose Quintana * #; 24 Davison Palermo; 13 Michael Prosecky; 55 Austin Smith; 16 Connor Staine; 18 Carlos Torres; 51 Fidel Ulloa; 22 Sam Weatherly; Catchers: 32 Cole Messina; 45 Jimmy Obertop; Infielders: 4 GJ Hill; 1 Dyan Jorge; 15 Aidan Longwell; 27 Skyler Messinger; 9 Jack O'Dowd; 7 Andy Perez; 10 Tevin Tucker; 8 Braylen Wimmer; Outfielders: 40 Mike Antico; 0 Jacob Humphrey; 6 Zach Kokoska; 2 Jared Thomas	Manager: 46 Robinson Cancel; Coaches: 5 Zach Osborne (hitting); 12 Michael Ryan (bench); 30 Jerry Sullivan (pitching); 60-day injured list: 55 Ben Shields; 7-day injured list; * On Colorado Rockies 40-man roster; ~ Development list; # Rehab assignment; ∞ Reserve list; ‡ Restricted list; § Suspended list; † Temporarily inactive list; Roster updated September 9, 2026; Transactions; → More rosters: MiLB • Eastern League; → Colorado Rockies minor league players
