= Dominican Summer League Rockies =

- Boca Chica

Minor league affiliations
- Class: Rookie
- League: Dominican Summer League
- Division: South

Major league affiliations
- Team: Colorado Rockies

Minor league titles
- League titles (0): None

Team data
- Name: Rockies
- Ballpark: Colorado Rockies Complex
- Owner(s)/ Operator(s): Colorado Rockies
- Manager: Mauricio Gonzalez

Dominican Summer League Colorado
- Boca Chica

Minor league affiliations
- Class: Rookie
- League: Dominican Summer League

Major league affiliations
- Team: Colorado Rockies

Minor league titles
- League titles (0): None

Team data
- Name: Rockies
- Ballpark: Colorado Rockies Complex
- Owner(s)/ Operator(s): Colorado Rockies
- Manager: Julio Campos

The Dominican Summer League Rockies or DSL Rockies are a Rookie League affiliate of the Colorado Rockies based in the Dominican Republic. They play in the Dominican Summer League. As an independent affiliate, they have been in existence since 1997. Starting in 2018, two squads were fielded, initially known as DSL Rockies 1 and DSL Rockies 2. In 2021, the two teams were named DSL Colorado and DSL Rockies.

== History ==
The team first came into existence in 1992, the year before the MLB debut of the Colorado Rockies. They shared an affiliation with the Kansas City Royals and the Chicago Cubs and were known as the DSL Royals/Cubs/Rockies. The team continued to share an affiliation with the Royals from 1993 to 1996, when it was known as the DSL Royals/Rockies. The team has been independently affiliated with the Rockies since 1997. Beginning in 2018, the DSL Rockies will split into two squads, competing as DSL Rockies 1 and DSL Rockies 2. Long-time manager Mauricio Gonzalez will coach Team 1, and Julio Campos will manage Team 2.

== Roster ==
Dominican Summer League Colorado roster
Players		Coaches/Other
Pitchers: 15 Leonardi Almonteo; -- Lenixon Armas; -- Diego Arroyo; 16 Julian Barboza; -- Felix Bello ‡; 18 Brailyn Compres; 19 Odarlin Cruz; -- Onofer De La Cruz; -- Oby Escalante; 20 Brian Fernandez; -- Gian Ferrari; 14 Ronaldo Florencio; 23 Maximo Gonzalez; 24 Josue Henrique; 40 Andres Herrera; -- Carlos Martorella; 29 Eliezer Pena; 33 Oscar Pujols; -- Roberto Salas; 32 Gregory Sanchez; -- Lewis Valerio	Catchers: -- Jose De La Cruz; -- Jose Guerra; -- Brian Rodriguez; Infielders: -- Jjam Alvarez; 2 Ashly Andujar; 1 Roldy Brito; -- Danny Cancro; 8 Diego Felix; 7 Dariel Garcia; 6 Herlinton Herrera; 8 Ronny Ugarte; Outfielders: -- Carlos Mota; 10 Anderson Tovar	Manager: -- Eugenio Jose; Coaches: -- Florentino Nunez (hitting); -- Edgardo Rivera; 7-day injured list * On Colorado Rockies 40-man roster ~ Development list # Rehab assignment ∞ Reserve list ‡ Restricted list § Suspended list † Temporarily inactive list Roster updated March 14, 2025; Transactions → More rosters: MiLB • Dominican Summer League → Colorado Rockies minor league players

Dominican Summer League Rockies roster
Players		Coaches/Other
Pitchers: 59 Yeremmy Cabeza; 77 Reiver Camacho; 70 Keywill Cedeno; 60 Efrain Cubilla; 55 Ruver Flores; 58 Jhon Medina; -- Gleiderson Mendoza; -- Moizes Moza; -- Wilmis Paulino; -- Edwin Pena ‡; -- Doilin Perez; 72 Marcos Pimentel; 73 Euri Pineda; 62 Anthony Ramirez; 79 Yadiel Ramon; 74 Ulises Reyes ‡; -- Kevin Tejeda; 66 Ervin Torres; -- Eric Veras; 68 Alison Zacarias	Catchers: 52 Cruzmel Arias; -- Gabriel Lopez; -- Nicolas Ortiz; Infielders: 46 Jarol Capellan; 44 Jeremy Ciriaco; 43 Wilder Dalis; -- Eriel Dihigo; Outfielders: -- Cristian Arguelles; 54 Wuilker Cumare; 53 Alessander De La Cruz; 57 Carlos Renzullo	Manager: -- Mauricio Gonzalez; Coaches: -- Samuel Deduno (pitching); -- Felix Rosario (hitting); 7-day injured list * On Colorado Rockies 40-man roster ~ Development list # Rehab assignment ∞ Reserve list ‡ Restricted list § Suspended list † Temporarily inactive list Roster updated March 14, 2025; Transactions → More rosters: MiLB • Dominican Summer League → Colorado Rockies minor league players
