= 2025 Colorado Rockies season =

2025 Colorado Rockies
- League: National League
- Division: West
- Ballpark: Coors Field
- City: Denver, Colorado
- Record: 43–119 (.265)
- Divisional place: 5th
- Owners: Charles & Richard Monfort
- Managers: Bud Black (until May 11); Warren Schaeffer (interim)
- Television: ROCKIES.TV
- Radio: KOA (English); KNRV (Spanish)
- Stats: ESPN.com; Baseball Reference

The 2025 Colorado Rockies season was their 33rd in Major League Baseball (MLB), their 31st season at Coors Field, and their ninth and final under manager Bud Black, who was fired on May 11, after a 7–33 (.175) start to the season. In their worst season in team history, one of the worst MLB seasons in the modern era since the previous year's Chicago White Sox, and one of the worst seasons in the National League since the 1962 New York Mets, the Rockies opened to an 8–42 (.160) record through their first 50 games, marking the worst 50-game start in the era. On May 31, following a defeat to the New York Mets, the Rockies established a new MLB record for the fewest number of wins at the end of May, 9, and are the first team in history to open a season with 19 straight series losses. The Rockies lost a major league-record 22 straight series dating back to the previous September. They won their first series on June 3, sweeping the Miami Marlins.

On July 8, following a defeat to the Boston Red Sox, the Rockies set a record for the most losses before the All-Star Break in modern history, with 74 losses, surpassing the 2024 White Sox, who had 71 losses. The Rockies clinched their seventh consecutive losing season after a 15–1 loss at home on August 4 to the Toronto Blue Jays. After a 5–1 loss to the Pittsburgh Pirates on August 23, the Rockies became the first team to be eliminated from postseason contention. After a 7–4 loss to the San Francisco Giants on September 2, the Rockies clinched their third consecutive 100-loss season. The team failed to improve on their 61-101 record from 2024 after a 10–8 home loss on September 6 to the San Diego Padres and set a franchise record for their worst season ever two days later upon losing their 104th game to the Los Angeles Dodgers. The Rockies, however, avoided tying the previous year's White Sox’s 41–121 record, securing their 42nd win on September 19 with a win against the Los Angeles Angels. On September 24, in a loss to the Mariners in which they allowed nine runs, the Rockies became the first team since their 1999 team to give up at least 1,000 runs to their opponents in a season. Four days later, after a 4–0 loss to San Francisco, the Rockies finished the season with 43 wins and 119 losses, tying for the third-most losses in the modern era with the 2003 Detroit Tigers, who had the same record. The Rockies' −424 run differential is the worst by any MLB team in the modern era and the worst since the 1899 Cleveland Spiders.

This was their first season without outfielder Charlie Blackmon since 2010, as he retired at the end of the 2024 season.

== Offseason ==
The Rockies finished the 2024 season 61–101, their second consecutive 100-loss season. This was the second-worst record in team history and second-worst record in the majors in 2024.

=== Roster departures ===
On September 23, 2024, outfielder Charlie Blackmon announced he would be retiring at the end of the season. On October 18, the Rockies sent outfielder Jake Cave, right-handed pitcher Dakota Hudson, and right-handed pitcher Peter Lambert outright to AAA Albuquerque. All three rejected the assignment and became free agents. On November 4, catcher Jacob Stallings declined the mutual option on his contract and became a free agent. On November 22, the Rockies announced that they had non-tendered right-handed pitcher Cal Quantrill and second baseman Brendan Rodgers, making them free agents. On March 26, 2025, outfielder Greg Jones was claimed off of waivers by the Chicago White Sox.

=== Coaching staff ===
On October 8, 2024, the Rockies signed a one-year contract extension with manager Bud Black, bringing him back for a ninth season. Also on October 8, bullpen coach Reid Cornelius and assistant hitting coach P.J. Pilittere were announced to not be returning. On October 25, Dustin Garneau was announced as the new bullpen coach.

=== Roster additions ===
On November 2, 2024, the Rockies acquired UT Owen Miller from the Milwaukee Brewers in exchange for cash considerations. On November 8, the Rockies claimed RHP Jimmy Herget off waivers from the Chicago Cubs. On November 14, the Rockies signed LHP Jack O'Loughlin to a minor-league contract with an invitation to spring training. On November 19, the Rockies added minor league OF Zac Veen to the 40-man roster ahead of the Rule 5 draft. On November 20, the Rockies announced they had re-signed C Jacob Stallings to a one-year major league deal with a mutual option for 2026. The Rockies signed UT Kyle Farmer to a one-year major league deal with a mutual option for 2026 on November 23. On December 8, the Rockies signed C Austin Nola to a minor-league contract with an invitation to spring training. The Rockies signed RHP Diego Castillo to a minor-league contract with an invitation to spring training on December 26. On January 9, 2025 the Rockies finalized a one-year major league contract with a mutual option for 2026 with 2B Thairo Estrada. On January 12, RHP Jake Woodford was signed to a minor-league contract with an invitation to spring training. 1B/2B Keston Hiura and OF Nick Martini were signed to minor-league deals with invitations to spring training on January 25.

Off-season 40-man roster moves

Departing Player	Date	Transaction	New Team	Arriving player	Old team	Date	Transaction
Jake Cave	October 18, 2024	Outrighted	(South Korea) Doosan Bears	Jimmy Herget	Chicago Cubs	November 8, 2024	Waivers
Dakota Hudson	October 18, 2024	Outrighted	Los Angeles Angels	Zac Veen	Albuquerque Isotopes	November 19, 2024	Added to 40-man roster
Peter Lambert	October 18, 2024	Outrighted	(Japan) Tokyo Yakult Swallows	Jacob Stallings	Colorado Rockies	November 20, 2024	Free Agency
Jacob Stallings	November 4, 2024	Free Agency	Colorado Rockies	Kyle Farmer	Minnesota Twins	November 23, 2024	Free Agency
Cal Quantrill	November 22, 2024	Non-tendered	Miami Marlins	Thairo Estrada	San Francisco Giants	January 9, 2025	Free Agency
Brendan Rodgers	November 22, 2024	Non-tendered	Houston Astros	Scott Alexander	Oakland Athletics	February 19, 2025	Free Agency
Aaron Schunk	February 19, 2025	DFA	Albuquerque Isotopes	Tyler Freeman	Cleveland Guardians	March 22, 2025	Trade
Justin Lawrence	March 3, 2025	Waivers	Pittsburgh Pirates	Nick Martini	Cincinnati Reds	March 23, 2025	Added to 40-man roster
Nolan Jones	March 22, 2025	Trade	Cleveland Guardians				
Greg Jones	March 26, 2025	Waivers	Chicago White Sox				

== Preseason ==
On January 24, 2025, the Rockies announced 23 invitations to Spring Training for non-roster players.

Pre-Season non-roster invitees

Player	Position	2024 team(s)
Zach Agnos	Pitcher	Hartford Yard Goats
Bryant Betancourt	Catcher	Spokane Indians
Julio Carreras	Infielder	Albuquerque Isotopes
Cole Carrigg	Outfielder	Spokane Indians
Diego Castillo	Pitcher	Minnesota Twins
Tommy Doyle	Pitcher	Atlanta Braves
Braxton Fulford	Catcher	Hartford Yard Goats
Keston Hiura	Infielder	Anaheim Angels
Gabriel Hughes	Pitcher	Salt River Rafters
Kyle Karros	Infielder	Spokane Indians
Jack O'Loughlin	Pitcher	Oakland Athletics
Nick Martini	Infielder	Cincinnati Reds
Owen Miller	Infielder	Milwaukee Brewers
Benny Montgomery	Outfielder	Hartford Yard Goats
Austin Nola	Catcher	Kansas City Royals
Ronaiker Palma	Catcher	Hartford Yard Goats
Carson Palmquist	Pitcher	Albuquerque Isotopes
Ryan Ritter	Infielder	Hartford Yard Goats
Sean Sullivan	Pitcher	Hartford Yard Goats
Sterlin Thompson	Outfielder	Hartford Yard Goats
Jake Woodford	Pitcher	Pittsburgh Pirates
Jefry Yan	Pitcher	Saitama Seibu Lions

The Rockies spring training began with pitchers and catchers reporting to Salt River Fields at Talking Stick in Scottsdale, Arizona on February 13, with the full squad reporting on February 18, and the first Cactus League game on February 21. On February 19, 2025 the Rockies announced the signing of LHP Scott Alexander to a one-year Major League contract. INF Aaron Schunk was designated for assignment to make room on the 40-man roster.On March 22, 2025, the Rockies traded OF Nolan Jones to the Cleveland Guardians for UT Tyler Freeman. On March 23, 2025, the Rockies selected the contract of OF Nick Martini.

== Schedule ==
=== Game log ===
Legend
	Rockies win
	Rockies loss
	Postponement
	Eliminated from playoff race
**Bold**	Rockies team member

2025 Game Log: 43–119 (Home 25–56, Road 18–63)
March/April: 5–25 (Home 4–11, Road 1–14)

#	Date	Opponent	Score	Win	Loss	Save	Attendance	Record	Streak
1	March 28	@ Rays	2–3	Fairbanks (1–0)	**Vodnik** (0–1)	–	10,046	0–1	L1
2	March 29	@ Rays	2–1	**Peralta** (1–0)	Littell (0–1)	**Halvorsen** (1)	10,046	1–1	W1
3	March 30	@ Rays	4–6	Bradley (1–0)	**Peralta** (1–1)	Fairbanks (1)	10,046	1–2	L1
4	March 31	@ Phillies	1–6	Ross (1–0)	**Alexander** (0–1)	–	44,595	1–3	L2
5	April 2	@ Phillies	1–5	Wheeler (1–0)	**Freeland** (0–1)	–	37,550	1–4	L3
6	April 3	@ Phillies	1–3	Walker (1–0)	**Senzatela** (0–1)	Alvarado (1)	34,097	1–5	L4
7	April 4	Athletics	3–6 (11)	Murdock (1–0)	**Chivilli** (0–1)	Miller (2)	48,015	1–6	L5
8	April 5	Athletics	4–7	Sears (1–1)	**Márquez** (0–1)	Miller (3)	27,599	1–7	L6
9	April 6	Athletics	12–5	**Dollander** (1–0)	Estes (0–2)	**Vodnik** (1)	26,207	2–7	W1
10	April 8	Brewers	1–7	Peralta (1–1)	**Freeland** (0–2)	–	18,657	2–8	L1
11	April 9	Brewers	2–17	Anderson (1–0)	**Senzatela** (0–2)	–	18,867	2–9	L2
12	April 10	Brewers	7–2	**Alexander** (1–1)	Payamps (0–1)	–	18,593	3–9	W1
13	April 11	@ Padres	0–8	Pivetta (2–1)	**Márquez** (0–2)	–	44,089	3–10	L1
14	April 12	@ Padres	0–2	Hart (2–0)	**Dollander** (1–1)	Suárez (7)	44,066	3–11	L2
15	April 13	@ Padres	0–6	King (3–0)	**Freeland** (0–3)	–	42,706	3–12	L3
16	April 14	@ Dodgers	3–5	May (1–1)	**Senzatela** (0–3)	Scott (5)	52,693	3–13	L4
17	April 15	@ Dodgers	2–6	Dreyer (2–0)	**Feltner** (0–1)	–	53,198	3–14	L5
18	April 16	@ Dodgers	7–8	Casparius (1–0)	**Márquez** (0–3)	Scott (6)	52,143	3–15	L6
―	April 18	Nationals	Postponed (snow); Makeup: April 20						
19	April 19	Nationals	11–12	Gore (2–2)	**Dollander** (1–2)	Finnegan (7)	24,606	3–16	L7
20	April 20	Nationals	2–3	Irvin (2–0)	**Freeland** (0–4)	Finnegan (8)	24,176	3–17	L8
21	April 20	Nationals	3–1	**Senzatela** (1–3)	Lord (0–2)	**Kinley** (1)	18,703	4–17	W1
22	April 22	@ Royals	3–4 (11)	Lynch IV (3–0)	**Kinley** (0–1)	–	14,567	4–18	L1
―	April 23	@ Royals	Postponed (rain); Makeup: April 24						
23	April 24	@ Royals	4–7	Zerpa (1–0)	**Márquez** (0–4)	Estévez (6)	see 2nd game	4–19	L2
24	April 24	@ Royals	2–6	Lorenzen (2–3)	**Dollander** (1–3)	–	15,601	4–20	L3
25	April 25	Reds	7–8	Ashcraft (1–2)	**Chivilli** (0–2)	Pagán (6)	21,743	4–21	L4
26	April 26	Reds	4–6	Greene (3–2)	**Senzatela** (1–4)	Pagán (7)	34,040	4–22	L5
27	April 27	Reds	1–8	Lodolo (3–2)	**Blalock** (0–1)	–	28,408	4–23	L6
28	April 28	Braves	3–6	Elder (1–1)	**Feltner** (0–2)	Iglesias (5)	18,852	4–24	L7
29	April 29	Braves	2–8	Smith-Shawver (1–2)	**Márquez** (0–5)	–	19,010	4–25	L8
30	April 30	Braves	2–1	**Dollander** (2–3)	Sale (1–3)	**Agnos** (1)	29,661	5–25	W1

May: 4–24 (Home 2–11, Road 2–13)

#	Date	Opponent	Score	Win	Loss	Save	Attendance	Record	Streak
31	May 1	@ Giants	4–3	**Chivilli** (1–2)	Rogers (2–1)	**Agnos** (2)	27,198	6–25	W2
32	May 2	@ Giants	0–4	Ray (4–0)	**Senzatela** (1–5)	–	35,036	6–26	L1
33	May 3	@ Giants	3–6	Rodríguez (2–0)	**Bird** (0–1)	Walker (6)	40,049	6–27	L2
34	May 4	@ Giants	3–9	Webb (4–2)	**Márquez** (0–6)	–	41,087	6–28	L3
―	May 6	Tigers	Postponed (rain); Makeup: May 8						
35	May 7	Tigers	6–8 (10)	Vest (2–0)	**Agnos** (0–1)	–	18,855	6–29	L4
36	May 8 (1)	Tigers	2–10	Mize (6–1)	**Freeland** (0–5)	–	see 2nd game	6–30	L5
37	May 8 (2)	Tigers	1–11	Montero (1–1)	**Gordon** (0–1)	–	23,030	6–31	L6
38	May 9	Padres	9–13	Vásquez (2–3)	**Senzatela** (1–6)	Suárez (15)	30,490	6–32	L7
39	May 10	Padres	0–21	Kolek (2–0)	**Blalock** (0–2)	–	38,423	6–33	L8
40	May 11	Padres	9–3	**Márquez** (1–6)	Pivetta (5–2)	–	34,422	7–33	W1
41	May 12	@ Rangers	1–2	Mahle (4–1)	**Dollander** (2–4)	Webb (1)	23,123	7–34	L1
42	May 13	@ Rangers	1–4	Leiter (3–2)	**Freeland** (0–6)	Armstrong (1)	19,924	7–35	L2
43	May 14	@ Rangers	3–8	Corbin (3–2)	**Senzatela** (1–7)	–	18,679	7–36	L3
44	May 16	@ Diamondbacks	0–8	Burnes (3–1)	**Palmquist** (0–1)	–	35,204	7–37	L4
45	May 17	@ Diamondbacks	14–12	**Bird** (1–1)	Thompson (1–1)	**Halvorsen** (2)	35,129	8–37	W1
46	May 18	@ Diamondbacks	0–1	Kelly (5–2)	**Dollander** (2–5)	Miller (4)	28,888	8–38	L1
47	May 19	Phillies	3–9	Ross (2–1)	**Halvorsen** (0–1)	–	23,487	8–39	L2
48	May 20	Phillies	4–7	Luzardo (5–0)	**Senzatela** (1–8)	–	24,431	8–40	L3
49	May 21	Phillies	5–9	Walker (2–3)	**Palmquist** (0–2)	–	23,421	8–41	L4
50	May 22	Phillies	0–2	Suárez (3–0)	**Márquez** (1–7)	Romano (6)	23,308	8–42	L5
51	May 23	Yankees	3–2	**Gordon** (1–1)	Schmidt (1–2)	**Agnos** (3)	47,211	9–42	W1
52	May 24	Yankees	1–13	Fried (7–0)	**Freeland** (0–7)	–	43,186	9–43	L1
53	May 25	Yankees	4–5	Leiter Jr. (3–3)	**Senzatela** (1–9)	Weaver (8)	38,379	9–44	L2
54	May 26	@ Cubs	1–3	Taillon (4–3)	**Palmquist** (0–3)	Palencia (3)	40,171	9–45	L3
55	May 27	@ Cubs	3–4 (11)	Flexen (3–0)	**Kinley** (0–2)	–	33,099	9–46	L4
56	May 28	@ Cubs	1–2	Boyd (5–2)	**Gordon** (1–2)	Palencia (4)	33,748	9–47	L5
57	May 30	@ Mets	2–4	Peterson (4–2)	**Freeland** (0–8)	Díaz (12)	41,270	9–48	L6
58	May 31	@ Mets	2–8	Senga (6–3)	**Senzatela** (1–10)	–	41,861	9–49	L7

June: 10–16 (Home 2–10, Road 8–6)

#	Date	Opponent	Score	Win	Loss	Save	Attendance	Record	Streak
59	June 1	@ Mets	3–5	Holmes (6–3)	**Palmquist** (0–4)	Buttó (1)	43,224	9–50	L8
60	June 2	@ Marlins	6–4	**Márquez** (2–7)	Meyer (3–5)	**Agnos** (4)	5,894	10–50	W1
61	June 3	@ Marlins	3–2	**Vodnik** (1–1)	Bender (1–4)	**Halvorsen** (3)	7,583	11–50	W2
62	June 4	@ Marlins	3–2	**Freeland** (1–8)	Quantrill (3–6)	**Kinley** (2)	6,261	12–50	W3
63	June 6	Mets	2–4	Stanek (2–4)	**Agnos** (0–2)	Díaz (14)	34,890	12–51	L1
64	June 7	Mets	1–8	Holmes (7–3)	**Márquez** (2–8)	–	38,279	12–52	L2
65	June 8	Mets	5–13	Megill (5–4)	**Dollander** (2–6)	Blackburn (1)	40,548	12–53	L3
66	June 10	Giants	5–6	Miller (3–0)	**Agnos** (0–3)	Doval (10)	24,553	12–54	L4
67	June 11	Giants	7–10	Beck (1–0)	**Kinley** (0–3)	–	23,532	12–55	L5
68	June 12	Giants	8–7	**Halvorsen** (1–1)	Rodríguez (3–1)	–	28,168	13–55	W1
69	June 13	@ Braves	4–12	De Los Santos (2–2)	**Vodnik** (1–2)	–	39,303	13–56	L1
70	June 14	@ Braves	1–4	Strider (1–4)	**Dollander** (2–7)	–	38,515	13–57	L2
71	June 15	@ Braves	10–1	**Bird** (2–1)	Holmes (3–6)	–	39,405	14–57	W1
72	June 16	@ Nationals	6–4	**Vodnik** (2–2)	Finnegan (0–2)	**Halvorsen** (4)	11,370	15–57	W2
73	June 17	@ Nationals	10–6	**Senzatela** (2–10)	Soroka (3–5)	–	17,232	16–57	W3
74	June 18	@ Nationals	3–1	**Márquez** (3–8)	Parker (4–8)	**Halvorsen** (5)	20,366	17–57	W4
75	June 19	@ Nationals	3–4 (11)	Loutos (1–0)	**Halvorsen** (1–2)	–	21,850	17–58	L1
76	June 20	Diamondbacks	8–14	Gallen (5–8)	**Gomber** (0–1)	–	31,851	17–59	L2
77	June 21	Diamondbacks	3–5	Kelly (7–3)	**Herget** (0–1)	Miller (8)	34,076	17–60	L3
78	June 22	Diamondbacks	4–2	**Senzatela** (3–10)	Pfaadt (8–5)	**Halvorsen** (6)	28,565	18–60	W1
79	June 24	Dodgers	7–9	Wrobleski (3–2)	**Márquez** (3–9)	Scott (16)	36,492	18–61	L1
80	June 25	Dodgers	1–8	Yamamoto (7–6)	**Dollander** (2–8)	–	43,881	18–62	L2
81	June 26	Dodgers	1–3	Kershaw (4–0)	**Chivilli** (1–3)	Scott (17)	38,091	18–63	L3
82	June 27	@ Brewers	6–10	Quintana (6–2)	**Freeland** (1–9)	–	35,008	18–64	L4
83	June 28	@ Brewers	0–5	Priester (6–2)	**Senzatela** (3–11)	–	32,057	18–65	L5
84	June 29	@ Brewers	4–3 (11)	**Vodnik** (3–2)	Anderson (1–3)	**Kinley** (3)	30,037	19–65	W1

July: 9–15 (Home 6–6, Road 3–9)

#	Date	Opponent	Score	Win	Loss	Save	Attendance	Record	Streak
85	July 1	Astros	5–6	Sousa (2–0)	**Dollander** (2–9)	Hader (24)	30,303	19–66	L1
86	July 2	Astros	3–5	Brown (9–3)	**Chivilli** (1–4)	Sousa (4)	30,545	19–67	L2
87	July 3	Astros	7–6	**Mejía** (1–0)	Weems (0–1)	**Halvorsen** (7)	25,151	20–67	W1
88	July 4	White Sox	2–3	Houser (4–2)	**Senzatela** (3–12)	Taylor (3)	48,074	20–68	L1
89	July 5	White Sox	3–10	Cannon (3–7)	**Márquez** (3–10)	–	47,351	20–69	L2
90	July 6	White Sox	6–4	**Agnos** (1–3)	Altavilla (0–2)	**Halvorsen** (8)	25,662	21–69	W1
91	July 7	@ Red Sox	3–9	Fitts (1–3)	**Gomber** (0–2)	–	32,441	21–70	L1
92	July 8	@ Red Sox	2–10	Bello (5–3)	**Freeland** (1–10)	–	30,169	21–71	L2
93	July 9	@ Red Sox	2–10	Giolito (6–1)	**Senzatela** (3–13)	–	31,691	21–72	L3
94	July 11	@ Reds	3–2	**Bird** (3–1)	Santillan (1–3)	**Vodnik** (3)	31,092	22–72	W1
95	July 12	@ Reds	3–4	Pagán (2–2)	**Vodnik** (3–3)	–	33,663	22–73	L1
96	July 13	@ Reds	2–4	Martinez (7–9)	**Gomber** (0–3)	Pagán (20)	24,541	22–74	L2
–	July 15	**95th All-Star Game in Cumberland, GA**							
97	July 18	Twins	6–4	**Freeland** (2–10)	Paddack (3–9)	**Halvorsen** (6)	37,759	23–74	W1
98	July 19	Twins	10–6	**Senzatela** (4–13)	Matthews (1–2)	–	42,131	24–74	W2
99	July 20	Twins	1–7	Ryan (10–4)	**Márquez** (3–11)	–	27,796	24–75	L1
100	July 21	Cardinals	2–6	McGreevy (2–1)	**Gomber** (0–4)	–	27,707	24–76	L2
101	July 22	Cardinals	8–4	**Blalock** (1–2)	Fedde (3–10)	–	30,137	25–76	W1
102	July 23	Cardinals	6–0	**Gordon** (2–2)	Pallante (5–7)	–	27,711	26–76	W2
103	July 25	@ Orioles	6–5	**Bird** (4–1)	Kittredge (1–2)	**Halvorsen** (10)	25,090	27–76	W3
104	July 26	@ Orioles	0–18	Rogers (4–1)	**Senzatela** (4–14)	–	20,188	27–77	L1
105	July 27	@ Orioles	1–5	Sugano (8–5)	**Gomber** (0–5)	–	16,407	27–78	L2
106	July 28	@ Guardians	8–6	**Kinley** (1–3)	Smith (2–4)	**Halvorsen** (11)	19,130	28–78	W1
107	July 29	@ Guardians	4–10	Allen (7–9)	**Gordon** (2–3)	–	19,803	28–79	L1
108	July 30	@ Guardians	0–5	Junis (3–1)	**Freeland** (2–11)	–	21,560	28–80	L2

August: 11–18 (Home 8–9, Road 3–9)

#	Date	Opponent	Score	Win	Loss	Save	Attendance	Record	Streak
109	August 1	Pirates	17–16	**Darnell** (1–0)	Santana (3–3)	–	36,030	29–80	W1
110	August 2	Pirates	8–5	**Hill** (1–0)	Ashcraft (3–2)	–	33,046	30–80	W2
111	August 3	Pirates	5–9	Keller (5–10)	**Blalock** (1–3)	–	32,394	30–81	L1
112	August 4	Blue Jays	1–15	Lauer (7–2)	**Gordon** (2–4)	–	20,075	30–82	L2
113	August 5	Blue Jays	4–10	Berríos (8–4)	**Molina** (0–1)	–	25,141	30–83	L3
114	August 6	Blue Jays	1–20	Gausman (8–8)	**Freeland** (2–12)	–	21,749	30–84	L4
115	August 8	@ Diamondbacks	1–6	Gallen (9–12)	**Gomber** (0–6)	–	29,941	30–85	L5
116	August 9	@ Diamondbacks	5–6	Hoffmann (1–0)	**Herget** (0–2)	–	38,337	30–86	L6
117	August 10	@ Diamondbacks	6–13	Pfaadt (12–7)	**Gordon** (2–5)	–	24,611	30–87	L7
118	August 11	@ Cardinals	2–3	Leahy (3–1)	**Mejía** (1–1)	–	20,836	30–88	L8
119	August 12	@ Cardinals	3–0	**Freeland** (3–12)	Liberatore (6–10)	**Vodnik** (3)	20,807	31–88	W1
120	August 13	@ Cardinals	6–5	**Herget** (1–2)	Romero (4–4)	**Vodnik** (4)	20,513	32–88	W2
121	August 14	Diamondbacks	2–8	Rodríguez (5–7)	**Blalock** (1–4)	–	23,045	32–89	L1
122	August 15	Diamondbacks	4–3	**Gordon** (3–5)	Pfaadt (12–8)	**Vodnik** (5)	26,081	33–89	W1
123	August 16	Diamondbacks	10–7	**Rolison** (1–0)	Hoffmann (1–1)	**Vodnik** (6)	27,929	34–89	W2
124	August 17	Diamondbacks	6–5	**Molina** (1–1)	Woodford (0–3)	**Mejía** (1)	22,895	35–89	W3
125	August 18	Dodgers	4–3	**Vodnik** (4–3)	Wrobleski (4–5)	–	27,259	36–89	W4
126	August 19	Dodgers	4–11	Sheehan (4–2)	**Gomber** (0–7)	–	25,480	36–90	L1
127	August 20	Dodgers	8–3	**Gordon** (4–5)	Ohtani (0–1)	–	35,240	37–90	W1
128	August 21	Dodgers	5–9	Kershaw (8–2)	**Dollander** (2–10)	–	28,305	37–91	L1
129	August 22	@ Pirates	0–9	Ashcraft (4–2)	**Senzatela** (4–15)	Chandler (1)	22,886	37–92	L2
130	August 23	@ Pirates	1–5	Mlodzinski (3–7)	**Freeland** (3–13)	–	22,588	37–93	L3
131	August 24	@ Pirates	0–4	Skenes (8–9)	**Brown** (0–1)	–	20,300	37–94	L4
132	August 26	@ Astros	6–1	**Gordon** (5–5)	Brown (10–6)	–	35,433	38–94	W1
133	August 27	@ Astros	0–4	Valdez (12–7)	**Dollander** (2–11)	–	28,338	38–95	L1
134	August 28	@ Astros	3–4	De Los Santos (5–3)	**Peralta** (1–2)	Ort (1)	29,523	38–96	L2
135	August 29	Cubs	7–11	Horton (9–4)	**Márquez** (3–12)	–	33,747	38–97	L3
136	August 30	Cubs	3–4	Assad (1–1)	**Brown** (0–2)	Palencia (21)	47,349	38–98	L4
137	August 31	Cubs	6–5	**Mejía** (2–1)	Palencia (1–5)	–	40,264	39–98	W1

September: 4–21 (Home 3–9, Road 1–12)

#	Date	Opponent	Score	Win	Loss	Save	Attendance	Record	Streak
138	September 1	Giants	2–8	Teng (2–3)	**Dollander** (2–12)	–	28,805	39–99	L1
139	September 2	Giants	4–7	Webb (13–9)	**Freeland** (3–14)	Walker (13)	18,934	39–100	L2
140	September 3	Giants	8–10	Peguero (1–0)	**Peralta** (1–3)	Walker (14)	19,802	39–101	L3
141	September 5	Padres	3–0	**Freeland** (4–14)	Pivetta (13–5)	**Vodnik** (7)	30,073	40–101	W1
142	September 6	Padres	8–10	Vásquez (4–6)	**Brown** (0–3)	Suárez (36)	43,461	40–102	L1
143	September 7	Padres	1–8	Cease (7–11)	**Gordon** (5–6)	—	27,555	40–103	L2
144	September 8	@ Dodgers	1–3	Glasnow (2–3)	**Chivilli** (1–5)	Scott (21)	48,433	40–104	L3
145	September 9	@ Dodgers	2–7	Sheehan (6–3)	**Márquez** (3–13)	—	44,126	40–105	L4
146	September 10	@ Dodgers	0–9	Snell (4–4)	**Freeland** (4–15)	―	50,805	40–106	L5
147	September 11	@ Padres	0–2	Vásquez (5–6)	**Brown** (0–4)	Suárez (37)	38,844	40–107	L6
148	September 12	@ Padres	4–2	**Gordon** (6–6)	Sears (8–11)	**Vodnik** (8)	40,014	41–107	W1
149	September 13	@ Padres	3–11	Cease (8–11)	**Blalock** (1–5)	―	41,854	41–108	L1
150	September 14	@ Padres	6–9	Darvish (4–5)	**Márquez** (3–14)	Suárez (38)	40,693	41–109	L2
151	September 16	Marlins	5–6	Pérez (7–5)	**Freeland** (4–16)	Henríquez (7)	22,764	41–110	L3
152	September 17	Marlins	4–8	Bachar (7–2)	**Hill** (1–1)	―	21,682	41–111	L4
153	September 18	Marlins	7–9	Alcántara (10–12)	**Gordon** (6–7)	Faucher (14)	21,760	41–112	L5
154	September 19	Angels	7–6	**Blalock** (2–5)	Farris (1–2)	**Vodnik** (9)	47,587	42–112	W1
155	September 20	Angels	0–3	Hendricks (8–10)	**Márquez** (3–15)	García (2)	36,407	42–113	L1
156	September 21	Angels	3–1	**Freeland** (5–16)	Dana (0–3)	**Vodnik** (10)	28,516	43–113	W1
157	September 23	@ Mariners	3–4	Speier (4–3)	**Mejía** (2–2)	Muñoz (38)	35,925	43–114	L1
158	September 24	@ Mariners	2–9	Castillo (11–8)	**Gordon** (6–8)	—	42,883	43–115	L2
159	September 25	@ Mariners	2–6	Ferguson (5–4)	**Blalock** (2–6)	―	40,686	43–116	L3
160	September 26	@ Giants	3–6	McDonald (1–0)	**Márquez** (3–16)	Walker (17)	40,048	43–117	L4
161	September 27	@ Giants	3–4	Verlander (4–11)	**Freeland** (5–17)	Bivens (2)	38,201	43–118	L5
162	September 28	@ Giants	0–4	Webb (15–11)	**Brown** (0–5)	Bivens (3)	37,536	43–119	L6

== Season standings ==
=== National League West ===
NL West
Team	W	L	Pct.	GB	Home	Road
Los Angeles Dodgers	93	69	.574	—	52‍–‍29	41‍–‍40
San Diego Padres	90	72	.556	3	52‍–‍29	38‍–‍43
San Francisco Giants	81	81	.500	12	42‍–‍39	39‍–‍42
Arizona Diamondbacks	80	82	.494	13	43‍–‍38	37‍–‍44
Colorado Rockies	43	119	.265	50	25‍–‍56	18‍–‍63

=== National League Wild Card ===
Division leaders
Team	W	L	Pct.
Milwaukee Brewers	97	65	.599
Philadelphia Phillies	96	66	.593
Los Angeles Dodgers	93	69	.574

Wild Card teams (Top 3 teams qualify for postseason)
Team	W	L	Pct.	GB
Chicago Cubs	92	70	.568	+9
San Diego Padres	90	72	.556	+7
Cincinnati Reds	83	79	.512	—
New York Mets	83	79	.512	—
San Francisco Giants	81	81	.500	2
Arizona Diamondbacks	80	82	.494	3
Miami Marlins	79	83	.488	4
St. Louis Cardinals	78	84	.481	5
Atlanta Braves	76	86	.469	7
Pittsburgh Pirates	71	91	.438	12
Washington Nationals	66	96	.407	17
Colorado Rockies	43	119	.265	40

=== Record vs. opponents ===
==== Record vs. National League ====
2025 National League record Source: MLB Standings Grid – 2025
Team	AZ	ATL	CHC	CIN	COL	LAD	MIA	MIL	NYM	PHI	PIT	SD	SF	STL	WSH	AL
Arizona	—	4–2	3–4	2–4	8–5	6–7	3–3	4–3	3–3	3–3	2–4	5–8	7–6	3–3	2–4	25–23
Atlanta	2–4	—	2–4	5–2	4–2	1–5	8–5	2–4	8–5	5–8	2–4	1–6	1–5	4–2	9–4	22–26
Chicago	4–3	4–2	—	5–8	5–1	4–3	4–2	7–6	2–4	2–4	10–3	3–3	1–5	8–5	3–3	30–18
Cincinnati	4–2	2–5	8–5	—	5–1	1–5	3–4	5–8	4–2	3–3	7–6	4–2	3–3	6–7	2–4	26–22
Colorado	5–8	2–4	1–5	1–5	—	2–11	3–3	2–4	0–6	0–7	2–4	3–10	2–11	4–2	4–3	12–36
Los Angeles	7–6	5–1	3–4	5–1	11–2	—	5–1	0–6	3–4	2–4	2–4	9–4	9–4	2–4	3–3	27–21
Miami	3–3	5–8	2–4	4–3	3–3	1–5	—	3–3	7–6	4–9	4–3	3–3	4–2	3–3	7–6	26–22
Milwaukee	3–4	4–2	6–7	8–5	4–2	6–0	3–3	—	4–2	4–2	10–3	2–4	2–5	7–6	6–0	28–20
New York	3–3	5–8	4–2	2–4	6–0	4–3	6–7	2–4	—	7–6	2–4	2–4	4–2	5–2	7–6	24–24
Philadelphia	3–3	8–5	4–2	3–3	7–0	4–2	9–4	2–4	6–7	—	3–3	3–3	3–4	2–4	8–5	31–17
Pittsburgh	4–2	4–2	3–10	6–7	4–2	4–2	3–4	3–10	4–2	3–3	—	1–5	4–2	7–6	4–3	17–31
San Diego	8–5	6–1	3–3	2–4	10–3	4–9	3–3	4–2	4–2	3–3	5–1	—	10–3	4–3	4–2	20–28
San Francisco	6–7	5–1	5–1	3–3	11–2	4–9	2–4	5–2	2–4	4–3	2–4	3–10	—	2–4	3–3	24–24
St. Louis	3–3	2–4	5–8	7–6	2–4	4–2	3–3	6–7	2–5	4–2	6–7	3–4	4–2	—	5–1	22–26
Washington	4–2	4–9	3–3	4–2	3–4	3–3	6–7	0–6	6–7	5–8	3–4	2–4	3–3	1–5	—	19–29

Updated with the results of all games through September 28, 2025.

==== Record vs. American League ====
2025 National League record vs. American League Source: MLB Standings
Team	ATH	BAL	BOS	CWS	CLE	DET	HOU	KC	LAA	MIN	NYY	SEA	TB	TEX	TOR
Arizona	2–1	2–1	2–1	2–1	2–1	0–3	0–3	1–2	1–2	2–1	2–1	3–0	1–2	4–2	1–2
Atlanta	1–2	0–3	3–3	2–1	3–0	3–0	1–2	1–2	1–2	3–0	1–2	1–2	1–2	0–3	1–2
Chicago	3–0	2–1	2–1	5–1	3–0	1–2	1–2	1–2	3–0	1–2	2–1	1–2	2–1	2–1	1–2
Cincinnati	0–3	2–1	1–2	1–2	5–1	2–1	1–2	2–1	2–1	2–1	2–1	1–2	3–0	1–2	1–2
Colorado	1–2	1–2	0–3	1–2	1–2	0–3	2–4	0–3	2–1	2–1	1–2	0–3	1–2	0–3	0–3
Los Angeles	2–1	1–2	1–2	3–0	2–1	3–0	0–3	2–1	0–6	2–1	2–1	3–0	2–1	2–1	2–1
Miami	1–2	2–1	1–2	1–2	1–2	2–1	1–2	2–1	2–1	2–1	3–0	1–2	3–3	3–0	1–2
Milwaukee	2–1	2–1	3–0	2–1	1–2	2–1	2–1	2–1	3–0	4–2	0–3	2–1	1–2	0–3	2–1
New York	2–1	1–2	1–2	2–1	0–3	2–1	1–2	2–1	3–0	1–2	3–3	2–1	0–3	1–2	3–0
Philadelphia	2–1	2–1	2–1	1–2	2–1	2–1	0–3	2–1	1–2	2–1	2–1	3–0	3–0	3–0	4–2
Pittsburgh	2–1	0–3	2–1	0–3	0–3	4–2	1–2	0–3	2–1	1–2	1–2	0–3	1–2	1–2	2–1
San Diego	2–1	0–3	2–1	2–1	3–0	1–2	1–2	2–1	2–1	1–2	1–2	1–5	0–3	2–1	0–3
San Francisco	5–1	2–1	2–1	1–2	1–2	0–3	3–0	1–2	1–2	0–3	2–1	3–0	1–2	2–1	0–3
St. Louis	2–1	2–1	0–3	3–0	3–0	1–2	2–1	3–3	1–2	3–0	0–3	0–3	1–2	1–2	0–3
Washington	1–2	5–1	0–3	1–2	1–2	2–1	1–2	1–2	2–1	2–1	0–3	2–1	0–3	1–2	0–3

Updated with the results of all games through September 28, 2025.

== Roster ==
2025 Colorado Rockies
Roster
Pitchers: 36 Zach Agnos; 52 Scott Alexander; 61 Nick Anderson; 59 Jake Bird; 64 Bradley Blalock; 51 McCade Brown; 57 Angel Chivilli; 59 Roansy Contreras; 52 Dugan Darnell; 32 Chase Dollander; 18 Ryan Feltner; 21 Kyle Freeland; 58 Lucas Gilbreath; 26 Austin Gomber; 29 Tanner Gordon; 54 Seth Halvorsen; 44 Jimmy Herget; 0 Jaden Hill; 40 Tyler Kinley; 48 German Marquez; 47 Juan Mejía; 43 Anthony Molina; 45 Carson Palmquist; 41 Luis Peralta; 50 Ryan Rolison; 49 Antonio Senzatela; 38 Victor Vodnik	Catchers: 37 Braxton Fulford; 15 Hunter Goodman; 20 Austin Nola; 3 Drew Romo; 25 Jacob Stallings; Infielders: 1 Adael Amador; 8,11 Orlando Arcia; 25 Warming Bernabel; 16 Blaine Crim; 39 Thairo Estrada; 6 Kyle Farmer; 7 Keston Hiura; 12 Kyle Karros; 24 Ryan McMahon; 11 Owen Miller; 8 Ryan Ritter; 30 Aaron Schunk; 4 Michael Toglia; 14 Ezequiel Tovar; 31 Alan Trejo	Outfielders: 27 Jordan Beck; 12 Sean Bouchard; 9 Brenton Doyle; 35 Yanquiel Fernández; 2 Tyler Freeman; 16 Sam Hilliard; 35 Nick Martini; 22 Mickey Moniak; 13 Zac Veen; Other batters: 23 Kris Bryant	Manager: 10 Bud Black; 34 Warren Schaeffer; Coaches: 75 Kyle Cunningham (asst. bullpen catcher); 73 Dustin Garneau (bullpen); 53 Ronnie Gideon (first base); 70 Andy González (third base); 55 Clint Hurdle (bench); 77 Aaron Muñoz (bullpen catcher); 74 Jordan Pacheco (hitting); 8 Mike Redmond (bench); 72 Darryl Scott (pitching); 34 Warren Schaeffer (third base); 72 Darryl Scott (pitching); 78 Nic Wilson (hitting)

== Player stats ==
= Indicates team leader

=== Batting ===
Note: G = Games played; AB = At bats; R = Runs scored; H = Hits; 2B = Doubles; 3B = Triples; HR = Home runs; RBI = Runs batted in; SB = Stolen bases; BB = Walks; AVG = Batting average; SLG = Slugging average

Player	G	AB	R	H	2B	3B	HR	RBI	SB	BB	AVG	SLG
Hunter Goodman	144	540	73	150	28	5	31	91	1	33	.278	.520
Jordan Beck	148	539	62	139	27	5	16	53	19	43	.258	.416
Brenton Doyle	138	502	57	118	23	2	15	57	18	30	.235	.378
Mickey Moniak	135	434	62	117	20	8	24	68	9	22	.270	.518
Tyler Freeman	110	377	50	106	20	2	2	31	18	34	.281	.361
Ezequiel Tovar	95	360	44	91	18	4	9	33	5	21	.253	.400
Ryan McMahon	100	350	42	76	15	1	16	35	2	49	.217	.403
Michael Toglia	88	306	22	58	15	1	11	32	3	28	.190	.353
Kyle Farmer	97	277	24	63	14	0	8	31	0	17	.227	.365
Ryan Ritter	60	187	22	45	9	3	1	18	3	10	.241	.337
Orlando Arcia	62	172	12	35	6	1	3	12	0	9	.203	.302
Thairo Estrada	39	154	14	39	9	0	3	21	1	6	.253	.370
Warming Bernabel	40	139	15	35	8	1	4	14	1	7	.252	.410
Yanquiel Fernández	52	138	13	31	5	0	4	11	0	8	.225	.348
Kyle Karros	43	137	20	31	4	0	1	9	0	15	.226	.277
Adael Amador	41	113	5	20	7	0	1	10	1	11	.177	.265
Braxton Fulford	38	108	11	23	5	2	1	16	1	7	.213	.324
Nick Martini	43	102	9	23	4	0	1	4	0	9	.225	.294
Jacob Stallings	28	84	4	12	3	0	0	6	0	5	.143	.179
Sean Bouchard	32	66	7	11	0	1	1	7	1	7	.167	.242
Blaine Crim	15	54	9	13	2	0	5	12	0	5	.241	.556
Sam Hilliard	20	51	8	10	3	1	2	3	2	10	.196	.412
Alan Trejo	13	40	3	7	2	0	0	1	0	1	.175	.225
Kris Bryant	11	39	2	6	2	0	0	1	0	2	.154	.205
Austin Nola	14	38	2	7	1	0	0	1	0	2	.184	.211
Zac Veen	12	34	1	4	1	0	1	2	1	2	.118	.235
Aaron Schunk	16	32	1	6	1	0	0	0	0	0	.188	.219
Keston Hiura	8	18	3	4	1	0	0	1	0	0	.222	.278
Owen Miller	9	14	0	2	0	0	0	1	1	2	.143	.143
Drew Romo	3	3	0	0	0	0	0	0	0	0	.000	.000
Totals	162	5408	597	1282	253	37	160	581	87	395	.237	.386

Source:Baseball Reference

=== Pitching ===
Note: W = Wins; L = Losses; ERA = Earned run average; G = Games pitched; GS = Games started; SV = Saves; IP = Innings pitched; H = Hits allowed; R = Runs allowed; ER = Earned runs allowed; BB = Walks allowed; SO = Strikeouts

Player	W	L	ERA	G	GS	SV	IP	H	R	ER	BB	SO
Kyle Freeland	5	17	4.98	31	31	0	162.2	193	105	90	38	124
Antonio Senzatela	4	15	6.65	30	23	0	130.0	192	103	96	47	73
Germán Márquez	3	16	6.70	26	26	0	126.1	168	106	94	48	83
Chase Dollander	2	12	6.52	21	21	0	98.0	103	76	71	49	82
Jimmy Herget	1	2	2.48	59	0	0	83.1	72	24	23	26	81
Tanner Gordon	6	8	6.33	15	15	0	75.1	96	60	53	17	62
Juan Mejía	2	2	3.96	55	0	1	61.1	52	34	27	25	68
Bradley Blalock	2	6	9.36	14	12	0	58.2	85	61	61	23	27
Angel Chivilli	1	5	7.06	43	0	0	58.2	76	49	46	23	43
Austin Gomber	0	7	7.49	12	12	0	57.2	82	51	48	17	34
Jake Bird	4	1	4.73	45	0	0	53.1	56	30	28	23	62
Victor Vodnik	4	3	3.02	52	0	10	50.2	45	19	17	26	49
Tyler Kinley	1	3	5.66	49	0	3	47.2	42	33	30	27	51
Ryan Rolison	1	0	7.02	31	1	0	42.1	55	35	33	20	25
Seth Halvorsen	1	2	4.99	42	0	11	39.2	41	26	22	21	36
Anthony Molina	1	1	7.27	17	1	0	34.2	52	30	28	6	24
Carson Palmquist	0	4	8.91	9	7	0	34.1	45	35	34	25	27
Zach Agnos	1	3	6.61	30	0	4	31.1	31	25	23	17	19
Ryan Feltner	0	2	4.75	6	6	0	30.1	33	17	16	12	25
Jaden Hill	1	1	3.38	28	0	0	29.1	27	14	11	12	31
McCade Brown	0	5	7.36	7	7	0	25.2	30	21	21	17	23
Luis Peralta	1	3	9.47	22	0	0	19.0	26	22	20	18	16
Scott Alexander	1	1	6.06	19	0	0	16.1	20	11	11	7	6
Nick Anderson	0	0	6.14	12	0	0	14.2	17	10	10	2	10
Dugan Darnell	1	0	3.86	9	0	0	11.2	10	5	5	7	5
Roansy Contreras	0	0	8.64	4	0	0	8.1	9	8	8	1	4
Jacob Stallings	0	0	4.50	1	0	0	2.0	2	1	1	0	1
Kyle Farmer	0	0	9.00	1	0	0	1.0	3	1	1	0	0
Austin Nola	0	0	72.00	1	0	0	1.0	8	8	8	0	0
Lucas Gilbreath	0	0	9.00	1	0	0	1.0	1	1	1	0	2
Alan Trejo	0	0	0.00	1	0	0	1.0	1	0	0	0	0
Totals	43	119	5.99	162	162	29	1407.1	1673	1021	937	554	1093

Source:Baseball Reference

== Transactions ==
=== March ===
- March 27: Placed RHP Jeff Criswell on the 15-day injured list (IL) retroactive to March 24 (Tommy John surgery). Placed LHP Austin Gomber on the 15-day IL retroactive to March 24 (left shoulder soreness). Placed 2B Thairo Estrada on the 10-day IL retroactive to March 24 (right wrist fracture). Signed free agent CF Mickey Moniak. Designated LF Sam Hilliard for assignment.
- March 31: Sent LF Sam Hilliard outright to Triple-A Albuquerque.

=== April ===
- April 6: Optioned RHP Bradley Blalock to Triple-A Albuquerque. Purchased the contract of RHP Chase Dollander from Albuquerque.
- April 7: Optioned OF Jordan Beck to Triple-A Albuquerque.
- April 8: Recalled OF Zac Veen from Triple-A Albuquerque.
- April 13: Recalled INF Adael Amador from Triple-A Albuquerque. Placed UTIL Tyler Freeman on the 10-day IL retroactive to April 11 (left oblique strain).
- April 14: Selected the contract of C Braxton Fulford from Triple-A Albuquerque. Transferred RHP Jeff Criswell to the 60-day IL (Tommy John surgery). Placed OF Kris Bryant on the 10-day IL retroactive to April 13.
- April 17: Placed OF Brenton Doyle on the bereavement list.
- April 19: Selected the contract of INF Aaron Schunk from Triple-A Albuquerque. Recalled OF Jordan Beck from Albuquerque. Placed INF Ezequiel Tovar on the 10-day IL retroactive to April 16 (left hip contusion). Placed LHP Austin Gomber on the 60-day IL (left shoulder soreness).
- April 20: Recalled RHP Jaden Hill from Triple-A Albuquerque. Selected the contract of RHP Zach Agnos from Albuquerque. Designated LHP Evan Justice for assignment. Placed RHP Victor Vodnik on the 15-day IL retroactive to April 17 (right shoulder inflammation).
- April 21: Optioned LHP Luis Peralta to Triple-A Albuquerque.
- April 23: Sent LHP Evan Justice outright to Triple-A Albuquerque. Optioned OF Zac Veen to Albuquerque. Activated OF Brenton Doyle from the bereavement list.
- April 24: Recalled RHP Juan Mejía from Triple-A Albuquerque.
- April 25: Selected the contract of INF Owen Miller from Triple-A Albuquerque, optioned RHP Juan Mejía and C Braxton Fulford to Albuquerque. Transferred INF Thairo Estrada from the 10-day IL to the 60-day IL (right wrist fracture).
- April 26: Recalled C Braxton Fulford from Triple-A Albuquerque. Placed INF Aaron Schunk on the 10-day IL (left groin strain). Acquired INF Alan Trejo from the Texas Rangers for cash.
- April 27: Selected the contract of INF Alan Trejo from Triple-A Albuquerque. Recalled RHP Bradley Blalock from Albuquerque. Optioned C Braxton Fulford and RHP Jaden Hill to Albuquerque. Designated LHP Lucas Gilbreath for assignment.
- April 28: Optioned RHP Bradley Blalock to Triple-A Albuquerque. Recalled RHP Juan Mejía from Albuquerque.
- April 29: Sent LHP Lucas Gilbreath outright to Triple-A Albuquerque.

=== May ===
- May 2: Recalled RHP Bradley Blalock from Triple-A Albuquerque. Placed RHP Ryan Feltner on the 15-day IL retroactive to April 29 (back spasms).
- May 8: Recalled RHP Tanner Gordon from Triple-A Albuquerque.
- May 9: Optioned RHP Tanner Gordon to Triple-A Albuquerque.
- May 11: Selected the contract of LHP Ryan Rolison from Triple-A Albuquerque. Recalled RHP Anthony Molina from Albuquerque. Optioned RHP Juan Mejía and Bradley Blalock to Albuquerque. Transferred OF Kris Bryant to the 60-day IL (lumbar degenerative disc disease).
- May 15: Optioned RHP Anthony Molina to Triple-A Albuquerque.
- May 16: Selected the contract of LHP Carson Palmquist from Triple-A Albquerque. Optioned OF Sean Bouchard to Albquerque. Activated SS Ezequiel Tovar, UT Tyler Freeman, and INF Aaron Schunk from the 10-day IL. Designated INF Owen Miller and INF Alan Trejo for assignment.
- May 18: Sent INF Alan Trejo outright to Triple-A Albuquerque, which he rejected.
- May 19: Sent INF Owen Miller outright to Triple-A Albuquerque, which he rejected.
- May 22: Recalled RHP Juan Mejía from Triple-A Albuquerque. Placed RHP Chase Dollander on the 15-day IL, retroactive to May 19 (right forearm tightness).
- May 23: Recalled RHP Tanner Gordon from Triple-A Albuquerque. Designated LHP Scott Alexander for assignment.
- May 26: Released LHP Scott Alexander.
- May 27: Optioned RHP Angel Chivilli to Triple-A Albuquerque. Activated RHP Victor Vodnik from the 15-day IL.
- May 28: Optioned INF Aaron Schunk to Triple-A Albuquerque. Signed free agent INF Orlando Arcia.
- May 29: Optioned INF Adael Amador to Triple-A Albuquerque.
- May 30: Selected the contract of OF Sam Hilliard from Triple-A Albuquerque. Activated INF Thairo Estrada from the 60-day IL. Designated OF Nick Martini for assignment.
- May 31: Selected the contract of INF Keston Hiura from Triple-A Albuquerque. Optioned 1B Michael Toglia to Triple-A Albuquerque. Designated INF Aaron Schunk for assignment.

=== June ===
- June 2: Sent INF Aaron Schunk outright to Triple-A Albuquerque. Released OF Nick Martini.
- June 3: Recalled RHP Angel Chivilli from Triple-A Albuquerque. Placed RHP Zach Agnos on the bereavement list. Activated RHP Chase Dollander from the 15-day IL. Placed RHP Tanner Gordon on the 15-day IL.
- June 5: Optioned RHP Angel Chivilli to Triple-A Albuquerque.
- June 6: Recalled C Braxton Fulford from Triple-A Albuquerque. Selected the contract of INF Ryan Ritter from Albuquerque. Activated RHP Zach Agnos from the bereavement list. Placed INF Ezequiel Tovar on the 15-day IL retroactive to June 3 (left oblique strain). Released C Jacob Stallings.
- June 7: Recalled OF Sean Bouchard from Triple-A Albuquerque. Placed OF Mickey Moniak on the bereavement list.
- June 9: Optioned OF Sean Bouchard to Triple-A Albuquerque.
- June 10: Activated OF Mickey Moniak from the bereavement list.
- June 12: Recalled RHP Anthony Molina from Triple-A Albuquerque. Optioned LHP Carson Palmquist to Albuquerque.
- June 15: Optioned RHP Zach Agnos to Triple-A Albuquerque. Recalled LHP Carson Palmquist from Albuquerque. Placed LHP Kyle Freeland on the 15-day IL retroactive to June 12 (low back stiffness). Activated LHP Austin Gomber from the 60-day IL. Transferred RHP Ryan Feltner from the 15-day IL to the 60-day IL (back spasms).
- June 16: Recalled 1B Michael Toglia from Triple-A Albuquerque. Designated INF Keston Hiura for assignment.
- June 20: Sent INF Keston Hiura outright to Triple-A Albuquerque.
- June 22: Optioned LHP Carson Palmquist to Triple-A Albuquerque. Recalled RHP Angel Chivilli from Albuquerque.
- June 27: Optioned RHP Anthony Molina to Triple-A Albuquerque. Activated LHP Kyle Freeland from the 15-day IL.

=== July ===
- July 1: Optioned C Braxton Fulford to Triple-A Albuquerque. Activated RHP Tanner Gordon from the 15-day IL and optioned him to Albuquerque. Designated OF Sam Hilliard for assignment. Selected the contract of C Austin Nola from Albuquerque. Recalled OF Yanquiel Fernández from Albuquerque.
- July 3: Optioned RHP Angel Chivilli to Triple-A Albuquerque. Recalled RHP Zach Agnos from Albuquerque.
- July 4: Activated RHP Ryan Feltner from the 60-day IL, and optioned him to Triple-A Albuquerque. Sent OF Sam Hilliard outright to Albuquerque.
- July 7: Optioned RHP Chase Dollander to Triple-A Albuquerque. Recalled RHP Bradley Blalock from Albuquerque.
- July 14: Placed INF Thairo Estrada on the 10-day IL retroactive to July 11 (sprained left thumb).
- July 18: Activated INF Ezequiel Tovar from the 10-day IL.
- July 20: Recalled INF Adael Amador from Triple-A Albuquerque. Placed INF Ryan Ritter on the 10-day IL (right middle finger laceration).
- July 23: Recalled RHP Tanner Gordon from Triple-A Albuquerque. Placed RHP Germán Márquez on the 15-day IL retroactive to July 21 (right bicep tendinitis).
- July 24: Optioned INF Adael Amador to Triple-A Albuquerque.
- July 25: Selected the contract of RHP Nick Anderson from Triple-A Albuquerque. Traded INF Ryan McMahon to the New York Yankees for minor-league RHP Josh Grosz and minor-league LHP Griffin Herring. Activated INF Thairo Estrada from the 10-day IL. Designated OF Sean Bouchard for assignment. Placed RHP Victor Vodnik on the paternity list.
- July 26: Selected the contract of INF Warming Bernabel from Triple-A Albuquerque.
- July 27: Recalled RHP Angel Chivilli and RHP Jaden Hill from Triple-A Albuquerque. Optioned LHP Ryan Rolison to Albuquerque. Placed RHP Zach Agnos on the 15-day IL.
- July 28: Optioned RHP Nick Anderson to Triple-A Albuquerque. Activated RHP Victor Vodnik from the paternity list.
- July 30: Traded RHP Tyler Kinley to the Atlanta Braves for minor-league RHP Austin Smith.
- July 31: Traded RHP Jake Bird to the New York Yankees for minor-league INF Roc Riggio and minor-league LHP Ben Shields.

=== August ===
- August 1: Recalled LHP Carson Palmquist from Triple-A Albuquerque. Sent OF Sean Bouchard outright to Albuquerque. Selected the contract of RHP Dugan Darnell from Albuquerque.
- August 2: Recalled LHP Ryan Rolison from Triple-A Albuquerque. Placed RHP Antonio Senzatela on the 15-day IL.
- August 3: Recalled C Braxton Fulford and RHP Nick Anderson from Triple-A Albuquerque. Optioned 1B Michael Toglia to Albuquerque. Placed RHP Seth Halvorsen on the 15-day IL.
- August 5: Recalled RHP Anthony Molina from Triple-A Albuquerque. Optioned LHP Carson Palmquist to Albuquerque.
- August 6: Recalled INF Adael Amador from Triple-A Albuquerque. Placed INF Thairo Estrada on the 10-day IL (right hamstring strain).
- August 8: Selected the contract of IF Kyle Karros and IF Aaron Schunk from Triple-A Albuquerque. Placed RHP Angel Chivilli on the restricted list. Placed INF Orlando Arcia on the 10-day IL retroactive to August 6 (right elbow inflammation). Transferred IF Thairo Estrada from the 10-day IL to the 60-day IL (right hamstring strain).
- August 11: Recalled RHP Chase Dollander from Triple-A Albuquerque. Designated C Austin Nola for assignment.
- August 13: Sent C Austin Nola outright to Triple-A Albuquerque.
- August 15: Optioned INF Adael Amador to Triple-A Albuquerque. Activated RHP Angel Chivilli from the restricted list and optioned him to Albuquerque. Activated INF Ryan Ritter from the 10-day IL.
- August 16: Optioned INF Aaron Schunk to Triple-A Albuquerque. Activated INF Orlando Arcia from the 10-day IL.
- August 17: Recalled LHP Luis Peralta from Triple-A Albuquerque. Optioned RHP Bradley Blalock and LHP Ryan Rolison to Albuquerque. Activated RHP Antonio Senzatela from the 15-day IL.
- August 22: Recalled RHP Angel Chivilli from Triple-A Albuquerque. Selected the contract of LHP Lucas Gilbreath from Albuquerque. Placed RHP Dugan Darnell on the 15-day IL (left hip inflammation). Released LHP Austin Gomber.
- August 24: Selected the contract of RHP McCade Brown from Double-A Hartford. Optioned LHP Lucas Gilbreath to Triple-A Albuquerque. Transferred RHP Dugan Darnell from the 15-day IL to the 60-day IL (left hip inflammation).
- August 29: Optioned RHP Nick Anderson to Triple-A Albuquerque. He elected free agency. Activated RHP Germán Márquez from the 15-day IL.

=== September ===
- September 1: Recalled C Drew Romo and LHP Ryan Rolison from Triple-A Albuquerque.
- September 2: Claimed RHP Roansy Contreras off waivers from the Baltimore Orioles.
- September 3: Optioned LHP Ryan Rolison to Triple-A Albuquerque.
- September 9: Recalled 1B Michael Toglia from Triple-A Albuquerque. Placed INF Warming Bernabel on the 7-day IL (concussion).
- September 11: Recalled LHP Ryan Rolison from Triple-A Albuquerque. Placed LHP Luis Peralta on the 15-day IL retroactive to September 8 (left hip inflammation).
- September 12: Recalled 1B Blaine Crim from Triple-A Albuquerque. Optioned 1B Michael Toglia to Albuquerque.
- September 13: Recalled RHP Bradley Blalock from Triple-A Albuquerque. Placed RHP Chase Dollander on the 15-day IL retroactive to September 10 (left patella tendon strain).
- September 24: Optioned LHP Ryan Rolison and C Drew Romo to Triple-A Albuquerque. Activated INF Warming Bernabel from the 7-day IL. Activated RHP Zach Agnos and LHP Luis Peralta from the 15-day IL. Placed RHP Roansy Contreras on the 15-day IL (right hand contusion).
- September 29: Recalled INF Aaron Schunk, LHP Ryan Rolison, INF Adael Amador, LHP Carson Palmquist, LHP Lucas Gilbreath, 1B Michael Toglia, C Drew Romo, RHP Ryan Feltner, and OF Zac Veen from AAA Albuquerque. Activated RHP Chase Dollander, RHP Seth Halvorsen, and RHP Roansy Contreras from the 15-day IL.

=== October ===
- October 31: RHP Dugan Darnell claimed off waivers by the Pittsburgh Pirates. Sent LHP Lucas Gilbreath and INF Aaron Schunk outright to Triple-A Albuquerque.

== Farm system ==
Level	Team	League	Manager	W	L	Position
AAA	Albuquerque Isotopes	Pacific Coast League (East Division)	Pedro Lopez			
AA	Hartford Yard Goats	Eastern League (Northeast Division)	Bobby Meacham			
High A	Spokane Indians	Northwest League	Robinson Cancel			
Low A	Fresno Grizzlies	California League (North Division)	Cesar Galvez			
Rookie	ACL Rockies	Arizona Complex League (East Division)	Fred Ocasio			
Foreign Rookie	DSL Rockies	Dominican Summer League (Northeast Division)	Mauricio Gonzalez			
Foreign Rookie	DSL Colorado	Dominican Summer League (Northeast Division)	Eugenio Jose			

== Major League Baseball draft ==
The 2025 draft was held July 13–14, 2025.

2025 Draft Picks

Round	Pick	Name	Position	School	Signed
1	4	Ethan Holliday	SS	Stillwater HS (OK)	Yes ($9.00m)
2	45	JB Middleton	RHP	Southern Mississippi	Yes ($2.07m)
CB-B	74	Max Belyeu	OF	Texas	Yes ($1.11m)
3	77	Ethan Hedges	3B	USC	Yes ($950.00k)
4	107	Riley Kelly	RHP	UC Irvine	Yes ($700.00k)
5	138	Cameron Nelson	OF	Wake Forest	Yes ($600.00k)
6	167	Matt Klein	C	Louisville	Yes ($425.00k)
7	197	Antoine Jean	LHP	Houston	Yes ($200.00k)
8	227	Tanner Thach	1B	UNC Wilmington	Yes ($325.00k)
9	257	Zach Rogacki	C	Binghamton	Yes ($50.00k)
10	287	Austin Newton	RHP	South Florida	Yes ($195.10k)
11	317	Zach Harris	RHP	Georgia	Yes ($200.00k)
12	347	Brady Parker	LHP	UHV	Yes ($150.00k)
13	377	Izeah Muniz	RHP	Mt. San Antonio CC	Yes ($150.00k)
14	407	Luke Broderick	RHP	Nebraska	Yes ($165.00k)
15	437	Dylan Crooks	RHP	Oklahoma	Yes ($175.00k)
16	467	Seth Clausen	RHP	Minnesota	Yes ($50.00k)
17	497	Derrick Smith	RHP	NC State	Yes ($100.00k)
18	527	Tyrelle Chadwick	RHP	Illinois State	Yes ($125.00k)
19	557	Easton Marks	RHP	FIU	Yes ($150.00k)
20	587	Ethan Cole	LHP	Augustana	Yes ($150.00k)

Records
Preceded by 2024	Colorado Rockies seasons 2025	Succeeded by 2026
