= Adael Amador =

Dominican baseball player (born 2003)

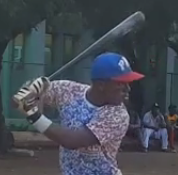
- Amador in the Dominican Republic in 2017

Colorado Rockies – No. 1
- Shortstop
- Born: April 11, 2003 (age 23); Santo Domingo, Dominican Republic
- Bats: Switch Throws: Right

MLB debut
- June 9, 2024, for the Colorado Rockies

MLB statistics (through 2026 season)
- Batting average: .212
- Home runs: 5
- Runs batted in: 26
- Stats at Baseball Reference

Teams
- Colorado Rockies (2024–present)

Adael Alexander Amador (ODD-eye-ell AH-muh-door, born April 11, 2003) is a Dominican professional baseball shortstop for the Colorado Rockies of Major League Baseball (MLB).

== Career ==
Amador signed with the Colorado Rockies as an international free agent on July 2, 2019, receiving a $1.5 million signing bonus His professional debut was delayed by the cancellation of the 2020 minor league season because of the COVID-19 pandemic. He debuted in 2021 with the rookie-level Arizona Complex League (ACL) Rockies, hitting .299/.394/.445 with four home runs and 24 runs batted in (RBI) over 47 games. He spent 2022 with the Single-A Fresno Grizzlies, hitting .292/.415/.445 with 15 home runs, 57 RBI, and 26 stolen bases across 115 games.

Amador split the 2023 campaign between the ACL Rockies, High-A Spokane Indians, and Double-A Hartford Yard Goats. In 69 appearances split between the three affiliates, he hit .287/.380/.495 with 12 home runs, 46 RBI, and 15 stolen bases. On November 14, the Rockies added Amador to their 40-man roster to protect him from the Rule 5 draft.

Amador was optioned to Double-A Hartford to begin the 2024 season. On June 8, Amador was called up to the major leagues for the first time. He debuted the next day, hitting a single on the first pitch he saw and stealing a base against the St. Louis Cardinals. He was the third-youngest player in franchise history at the time of his MLB debut. In 10 games for Colorado during his first MLB season, Amador went 6-for-35 (.171) with one stolen base. He was placed on the injured list on June 21 with a tight left oblique muscle and was demoted to Double-A upon activation.

Amador was optioned to the Triple-A Albuquerque Isotopes to begin the 2025 season. He returned to the Rockies on April 13, following an injury to Tyler Freeman. On April 26, Amador hit his first MLB home run off of Hunter Greene of the Cincinnati Reds. He finished his rookie season hitting no additional home runs, batting .177 with 7 doubles and 10 RBI in 41 games. He and teammate Kyle Farmer were both among the worst second basemen in the majors, according to FanGraphs' calculation of wins above replacement.

Amador was optioned to Triple-A Albuquerque to begin the 2026 season.
