= Andrew Hoffmann =

American baseball player (born 2000)

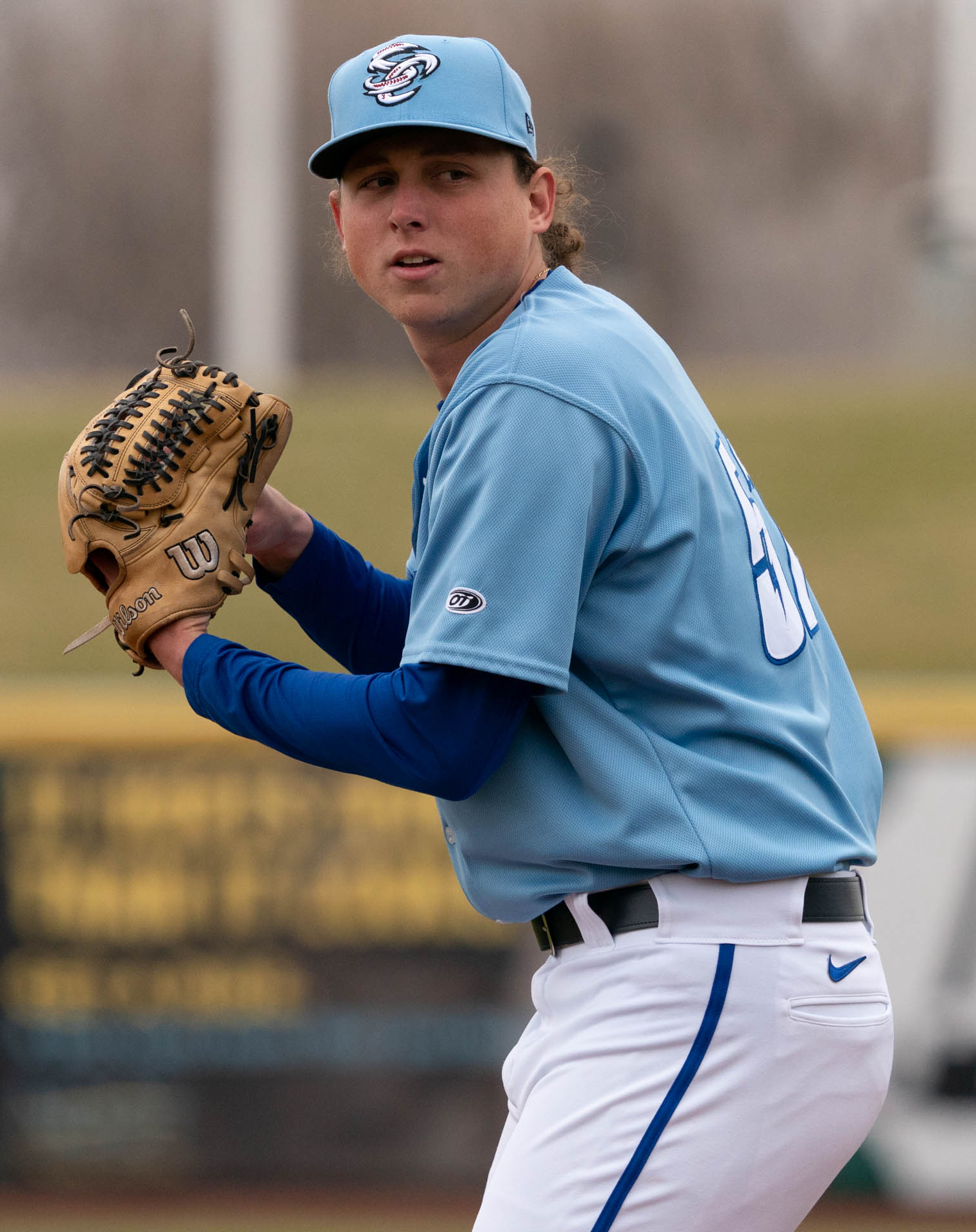
- Hoffmann with the Omaha Storm Chasers in 2024

Free agent
- Pitcher
- Born: February 2, 2000 (age 26); Joliet, Illinois, U.S.
- Bats: Right Throws: Right

MLB debut
- May 30, 2025, for the Kansas City Royals

MLB statistics (through 2026 season)
- Win–loss record: 2–1
- Earned run average: 6.85
- Strikeouts: 24
- Stats at Baseball Reference

Teams
- Kansas City Royals (2025); Arizona Diamondbacks (2025–2026)

Andrew Michael Hoffmann (born February 2, 2000) is an American professional baseball pitcher who is a free agent. He has previously played in Major League Baseball (MLB) for the Kansas City Royals and Arizona Diamondbacks.

== Career ==
=== Amateur ===
Hoffmann attended Plainfield East High School in Plainfield, Illinois, and played college baseball at Oakland University, John A. Logan College and the University of Illinois Urbana-Champaign. In 2019 and 2020, Hoffmann played summer league baseball for the Traverse City Pit Spitters of the Northwoods League.

=== Atlanta Braves ===
The Atlanta Braves selected Hoffmann in the 12th round of the 2021 Major League Baseball draft. He made his professional debut with the Augusta GreenJackets and started 2022 with the Rome Braves; in 15 starts for Rome, Hoffmann compiled a 7-2 record and 2.36 ERA with 90 strikeouts over 80 innings of work.

=== Kansas City Royals ===
On July 11, 2022, the Braves traded Hoffmann, Drew Waters, and CJ Alexander to the Kansas City Royals in exchange for the 35th overall selection of the 2022 Major League Baseball draft. He made nine starts down the stretch for the Double-A Northwest Arkansas Naturals, posting a 2-4 record and 6.64 ERA with 30 strikeouts. Hoffmann split the 2023 season between Northwest Arkansas and the Triple-A Omaha Storm Chasers, accumulating a 7-9 record and 5.53 ERA with 133 strikeouts in 125 1/3 innings pitched across 28 games (27 starts).

Hoffmann split the 2024 season between Omaha, Northwest Arkansas, and the rookie-level Arizona Complex League Royals. In 29 appearances (15 starts) for the three affiliates, he struggled to a 3-6 record and 6.08 ERA with 77 strikeouts over 77 innings of work.

Hoffmann began the 2025 campaign with Triple-A Omaha, posting a 2-2 record and 2.84 ERA with 37 strikeouts over 19 appearances. On May 28, 2025, Hoffmann was selected to the 40-man roster and promoted to the major leagues for the first time. He made three appearances for Kansas City, recording a 3.86 ERA with five strikeouts in 4 2/3 innings.

=== Arizona Diamondbacks ===
On July 26, 2025, the Royals traded Hoffmann to the Arizona Diamondbacks in exchange for Randal Grichuk. On August 9, Hoffmann recorded his first career win, tossing a scoreless inning of relief against the Colorado Rockies. He made eight appearances down the stretch for Arizona, logging a 1–1 record and 7.36 ERA with seven strikeouts across 7 1/3 innings pitched.

Hoffmann pitched in eight games for the Diamondbacks in 2026, registering a 1–0 record and 7.71 ERA with 12 strikeouts across 11 2/3 innings pitched. Hoffmann was designated for assignment by Arizona on August 17, 2026.

=== Philadelphia Phillies ===
On August 20, 2026, Hoffmann was claimed off of waivers by the Philadelphia Phillies. He was assigned to the Triple-A Lehigh Valley IronPigs with whom he pitched two innings and gave up six earned runs. On November 20, Hoffmann was non-tendered by the Phillies and became a free agent.
