= Warming Bernabel =

Dominican baseball player (born 2002)

Sioux City Explorers
- First baseman
- Born: June 6, 2002 (age 24); Bani, Dominican Republic
- Bats: Right Throws: Right

MLB debut
- July 26, 2025, for the Colorado Rockies

MLB statistics (through 2025 season)
- Batting average: .252
- Home runs: 4
- Runs batted in: 14
- Stats at Baseball Reference

Teams
- Colorado Rockies (2025)

Warming Jose Bernabel (born June 6, 2002) is a Dominican professional baseball first baseman for the Sioux City Explorers of the American Association of Professional Baseball. He has previously played in Major League Baseball (MLB) for the Colorado Rockies. He signed with the Rockies as an international free agent in 2018, and made his MLB debut for them in 2025.

== Career ==
=== Colorado Rockies ===
==== 2018–2024: Minor leagues ====
Bernabel signed with the Colorado Rockies as an international free agent on July 2, 2018, receiving a $900,000 bonus. He made his professional debut in 2019 with the Dominican Summer League Rockies.

Bernabel did not play in a game in 2020 due to the cancellation of the minor league season because of the COVID-19 pandemic. He returned in 2021 to play for the rookie-level Arizona Complex League (ACL) Rockies and Single-A Fresno Grizzlies. He was the ACL Player of the Month Award in July. He played in 2022 with Fresno and the High-A Spokane Indians. After the season, he played in the Arizona Fall League. On November 15, the Rockies added Bernabel to their 40-man roster to protect him from the Rule 5 draft.

After suffering two gunshot wounds in the offseason, Bernabel played the 2023 season with the Double-A Hartford Yard Goats. In 83 games, Bernabel hit .225/.270/.338 with 6 home runs and 28 RBI.

Bernabel was again optioned to Double-A Hartford to begin the 2024 season. On March 28, he was designated for assignment following the promotion of Alan Trejo. Bernabel cleared waivers and was sent outright to Hartford on March 30. Bernabel made 120 appearances for the Yard Goats in 2024, slashing .263/.296/.359 with nine home runs, 64 RBI, and 12 stolen bases.

==== 2025: MLB debut ====
Bernabel began the 2025 season with the Triple-A Albuquerque Isotopes, where he batted .301/.356/.450 with eight home runs, 45 RBI, and five stolen bases across 75 games.

On July 26, Bernabel was selected to the Rockies 40-man roster and promoted to the major leagues for the first time. He was named National League Player of the Week for the week of July 28–August 3, shortly after his debut with the Rockies. After batting .500 with three home runs in his first seven major league games, he ended the season slashing .252/.288/.410 with four home runs and 14 RBI in 40 games, mostly playing first base. He missed two weeks in September after suffering a concussion. On December 6, the Rockies removed him from the 40-man roster and sent him outright to Albuquerque, but Bernabel elected free agency rather than accepting the assignment.

=== Tecolotes de los Dos Laredos ===
On December 19, 2025, Bernabel signed a minor league contract with the Washington Nationals. Bernabel was released by the Nationals prior to the start of the regular season on March 21, 2026.

On May 27, 2026, Bernabel signed with the Tecolotes de los Dos Laredos of the Mexican League. He only made two plate appearances for Dos Laredos, going 0-for-2, before he was released by the team on June 1.

=== Sioux City Explorers ===
On June 11, 2026, Bernabel signed with the Sioux City Explorers of the American Association of Professional Baseball.

== Personal life ==
Bernabel's first name Warming is a portmanteau of his father's name, Warren, and his grandfather's name, Ming.

On December 3, 2023, Bernabel and his wife were the victims of a robbery attempt in the Dominican Republic, an incident in which he suffered multiple gunshots to the back.
