= Braxton Fulford =

American baseball player (born 1998)

Colorado Rockies – No. 37
- Catcher
- Born: December 9, 1998 (age 27); Lubbock, Texas, U.S.
- Bats: Right Throws: Right

MLB debut
- April 16, 2025, for the Colorado Rockies

MLB statistics (through 2026 season)
- Batting average: .198
- Home runs: 2
- Runs batted in: 23
- Stats at Baseball Reference

Teams
- Colorado Rockies (2025–present)

Braxton Albert Fulford (born December 9, 1998) is an American professional baseball catcher for the Colorado Rockies of Major League Baseball (MLB). He made his MLB debut in 2025.

== Amateur career ==
Fulford attended Monterey High School in Lubbock, Texas. As a senior in 2017, he batted .571 with one home run, 37 runs batted in (RBI), and 13 doubles.

Fulford was not selected in the 2017 Major League Baseball (MLB) draft and enrolled at Texas Tech University to play college baseball for the Red Raiders. As a senior in 2021, he hit .264 with 14 home runs, 44 RBI, and 12 doubles in 52 games.

== Professional career ==
After the 2021 college baseball season, the Colorado Rockies Fulford in the sixth round, with the 170th overall pick of the 2021 MLB draft. He made his professional debut in 2021 with the rookie-level Arizona Complex League Rockies, hitting .267 over 14 games. Fulford played the 2022 season with the Single-A Fresno Grizzlies, batting .268 with 15 home runs, 53 RBI, and 17 doubles over 104 games. He opened the 2023 season with the High-A Spokane Indians, being named the Northwest League player of the week in mid-April, and was promoted to the Double-A Hartford Yard Goats in late May, then the Triple-A Albuquerque Isotopes near the end of the season. Over 78 games played in 2023, Fulford hit .270 with ten home runs and 34 RBI. He spent the 2024 season back with Hartford and had .241/.341/.412 slash line with 10 home runs, 46 RBI, and 10 stolen bases across 92 games. Fulford was named the Rockies Minor League Player of the Month for August after batting .298.

The Rockies planned to send Fulford back to Hartford to begin the 2025 season, but following injuries to catchers Drew Romo and Austin Nola, he started the year in Albuquerque, hitting .395/.477/.868 with five home runs and 10 RBI over 12 games. On April 14, Fulford was selected to the 40-man roster and promoted to the major leagues for the first time. He made his MLB debut on April 16 and was the first player in franchise history to debut by batting 0-for-4 with 4 strikeouts, a golden sombrero. On April 20, his second MLB game, Fulford hit his first home run, a solo shot off of Jake Irvin of the Washington Nationals. He also made three throwing errors in that game, a 3–2 loss. He returned to Albuquerque after one more game.

Fulford returned to the majors in June when the Rockies released catcher Jacob Stallings. Fulford played in 10 games that month, returning to Albuquerque on July 1 when Nola was promoted. Fulford returned to the Rockies in August, backing up Hunter Goodman for the rest of the season. Fulford played in a total of 38 games for the Rockies and ended the season with a .213/.267/.324 slash line, one home run, and 16 RBI.

Fulford was optioned to Triple-A Albuquerque to begin the 2026 season. However, following an injury to Mickey Moniak, the Rockies recalled him to the major leagues on March 27, which was Opening Day. Fulford was optioned back to Albuquerque on April 1, and was recalled and optioned multiple times throughout the season. He played in 47 games for the Rockies and batted .176 with one home run, seven RBI, and four doubles across 74 at bats. With Albuquerque, Fulford played in 48 games and hit .251 with eight home runs and 27 RBI.

== Personal life ==
Fulford's cousin is professional quarterback Paxton Lynch.
