= McCade Brown =

American baseball player (born 2000)

Colorado Rockies – No. 51
- Pitcher
- Born: August 15, 2000 (age 26); Normal, Illinois, U.S.
- Bats: Right Throws: Right

MLB debut
- August 24, 2025, for the Colorado Rockies

MLB statistics (through 2025 season)
- Win–loss record: 0–5
- Earned run average: 7.36
- Strikeouts: 23
- Stats at Baseball Reference

Teams
- Colorado Rockies (2025)

McCade David Brown (born August 15, 2000) is an American professional baseball pitcher for the Colorado Rockies of Major League Baseball (MLB). He made his MLB debut in 2025.

== Amateur career ==
Brown attended Normal Community West High School in Normal, Illinois. He considered quitting baseball before making the varsity team, but continued after his mother arranged private training for him. His school's baseball team won two regional championships and a conference championship. In 2018, he went 8–2 with a 1.64 ERA and a school-record 124 strikeouts.

Brown then played college baseball at Indiana University. He pitched only 6 2/3 innings during his first two seasons with the Hoosiers, with the 2020 season ending early due to the COVID-19 pandemic. That summer, he pitched in collegiate summer baseball for the Normal CornBelters in the Kernels Collegiate League. He was named the player of the week by Collegiate Baseballand D1Baseball and pitcher of the week by Perfect Game and the Big 10 Conference after striking out a school-record 16 Penn State batters in seven scoreless, no-hit innings on March 13, 2021. That season, he was 5–4 with a 3.39 ERA and 97 strikeouts in 61 innings. He was named to the All-Big Ten second team.

== Professional career ==
=== 2021–2024: Draft and injury ===
The Colorado Rockies selected Brown in the third round of the 2021 Major League Baseball draft. He signed, receiving a $760,000 signing bonus. He pitched four games that summer for the Arizona Complex League (ACL) Rockies. Injuries bookended his 2022 season, with shoulder soreness keeping him out for the first month and an elbow injury on September 3 closing out his season. He was 4–4 with a 5.22 ERA for the Single-A Fresno Grizzlies. He had a platelet-rich plasma injection in September, then opted for Tommy John surgery and an ulnar nerve transposition in early 2023.

Brown came back from elbow surgery in May 2024 with the ACL Rockies. He returned to Fresno later in the season, going a combined 1–3 with a 6.85 ERA and 35 strikeouts in 28 2/3 innings pitched for the two teams. He then pitched in 8 games for the Salt River Rafters of the Arizona Fall League. During the offseason, he changed the grip on his changeup.

=== 2025: MLB debut ===
Brown began the 2025 season with the High-A Spokane Indians, advancing to the Double-A Hartford Yard Goats in late May. There, pitching coach Dan Meyer encouraged Brown to pitch more efficiently, challenging him to get batters out in five pitches or fewer.

On August 24, the Rockies selected Brown to their 40-man roster and promoted him to the major leagues. He made his MLB debut that day against the Pittsburgh Pirates, losing to Paul Skenes. Brown went 0–5 in his first season in the majors with a 7.36 ERA and 23 strikeouts, allowing six home runs and 17 walks in 25 2/3 innings over 7 starts.

Brown was placed on the injured list to begin the 2026 season due to right shoulder inflammation. He was transferred to the 60-day injured list on April 4, 2026.

== Personal life ==
Brown is married. His mother is the head volleyball coach at Illinois Wesleyan University, and his father is a Bloomington, Illinois police officer. He has a sister.

In high school, Brown played soccer for four years. He played basketball for two years, quitting to focus on training for baseball.
