= Zac Veen =

American baseball player (born 2001)

Colorado Rockies – No. 13
- Outfielder
- Born: December 12, 2001 (age 24); Port Orange, Florida, U.S.
- Bats: Left Throws: Right

MLB debut
- April 8, 2025, for the Colorado Rockies

MLB statistics (through 2026 season)
- Batting average: .194
- Home runs: 4
- Runs batted in: 15
- Stats at Baseball Reference

Teams
- Colorado Rockies (2025–present)

Zachary Richard Veen (born December 12, 2001) is an American professional baseball outfielder for the Colorado Rockies of Major League Baseball (MLB). He was selected ninth overall by the Rockies in the 2020 MLB draft and made his MLB debut in 2025.

== Amateur career ==
Veen attended Spruce Creek High School in Port Orange, Florida. As a junior in 2019, he was named The Daytona Beach News-Journal Baseball Player of the Year after hitting .414 with 36 stolen bases. He played in the 2019 Under Armour All-America Baseball Game and 2019 Perfect Game All-American Classic. In November 2019, he committed to play college baseball at the University of Florida.

== Professional career ==
Veen was considered one of the top prospects for the 2020 Major League Baseball draft. He was selected ninth overall by the Colorado Rockies. He signed with the Rockies on June 24 for a $5 million bonus. Veen did not appear for the Rockies organization in 2020 due to the cancellation of the minor league season because of the COVID-19 pandemic.

Veen made his professional debut in 2021 with the Fresno Grizzlies of the Low-A West. Over 106 games, he slashed .301/.399/.501 with 15 home runs, 75 RBI, 27 doubles and 36 stolen bases. He was assigned to the Spokane Indians of the High-A Northwest League to begin the 2022 season. He was promoted to the Hartford Yard Goats of the Double-A Eastern League in early August. Over 126 games between the two teams, he compiled a slash line of .245/.340/.384 with 12 home runs, 67 RBI, and 55 stolen bases while being caught nine times.

He played in the 2022 Arizona Fall League, where he batted .356/.467/.466, and led the league in stolen bases (16; while being caught twice).

Veen spent the 2023 season with the Double–A Hartford Yard Goats, playing in 46 games and hitting .209/.304/.308 with 2 home runs, 24 RBI, and 22 stolen bases. On June 21, 2023, it was announced that Veen would undergo season–ending surgery to repair tearing and fraying to a ligament in his left hand.

Veen split the 2024 campaign between the rookie–level Arizona Complex League Rockies, Spokane, Hartford, and the Triple–A Albuquerque Isotopes. In 65 appearances for the four affiliates, he slashed .258/.346/.459 with 11 home runs, 35 RBI, and 21 stolen bases. Following the season, the Rockies added Veen to their 40-man roster to protect him from the Rule 5 draft.

Veen was optioned to Triple-A Albuquerque to begin the 2025 season. On April 8, 2025, Veen was promoted to the major leagues for the first time. On April 20, Veen hit his first career home run, a solo shot off of Jake Irvin of the Washington Nationals.
