= Yanquiel Fernández =

Cuban baseball player (born 2003)

Free agent
- Outfielder
- Born: January 1, 2003 (age 23); Havana, Cuba
- Bats: Left Throws: Left

MLB debut
- July 2, 2025, for the Colorado Rockies

MLB statistics (through 2025 season)
- Batting average: .225
- Home runs: 4
- Runs batted in: 11
- Stats at Baseball Reference

Teams
- Colorado Rockies (2025)

Yanquiel Fernández (born January 1, 2003) is a Cuban professional baseball outfielder who is a free agent. He has previously played in Major League Baseball (MLB) for the Colorado Rockies.

== Career ==
=== Colorado Rockies ===
Fernández signed with the Colorado Rockies as an international free agent on July 12, 2019 for $295,000. He did not play in a game in 2020 due to the cancellation of the minor league season because of the COVID-19 pandemic. Fernández made his professional debut in 2021 with the Dominican Summer League Rockies.

Fernández played 2022 with the Fresno Grizzlies and was named a California League postseason All-Star after leading the league in runs batted in (RBI), extra-base hits, and total bases. He started 2023 with Fresno, playing three games before being promoted to the Spokane Indians. He joined the Double-A Hartford Yard Goats in June. He played in the All-Star Futures Game in July. On November 14, the Rockies added Fernández to their 40-man roster to protect him from the Rule 5 draft.

Fernández was ranked in the bottom half of several top 100 prospect lists before the 2024 season. After playing in eight spring training games, he optioned to Hartford to begin the season, advancing to the Triple-A Albuquerque Isotopes on August 6. In 122 games split between Hartford and Albuquerque, Fernández batted a combined .262/.319/.403 with 12 home runs and 64 RBI.

Fernández was optioned to Albuquerque to begin the 2025 season. In 64 appearances for the Isotopes, he slashed .284/.347/.502 with 13 home runs and 39 RBI. On July 1, Fernández was promoted to the major leagues for the first time. On July 4, he singled off of Chicago White Sox starter Adrian Houser for his first MLB hit. In his rookie season, Fernández batted .225/.265/.348 with four home runs and 11 RBI over 52 games. Defensively, he has the second-best arm strength in the majors, throwing with an average speed of 97.2 miles per hour.

On January 28, 2026, Fernández was designated for assignment by the Rockies.

=== New York Yankees ===
On February 4, 2026, the New York Yankees claimed Fernández off of waivers. He was designated for assignment by the Yankees on February 9. Fernández cleared waivers and was sent outright to the Triple-A Scranton/Wilkes-Barre RailRiders on February 16. In 126 games with Triple-A Scranton/Wilkes-Barre Railriders he batted .258/.314/.469 with 27 home runs, 87 RBIs and 3 stolen bases. He elected free agency on November 2.
