= Aaron Schunk =

American baseball player (born 1997)

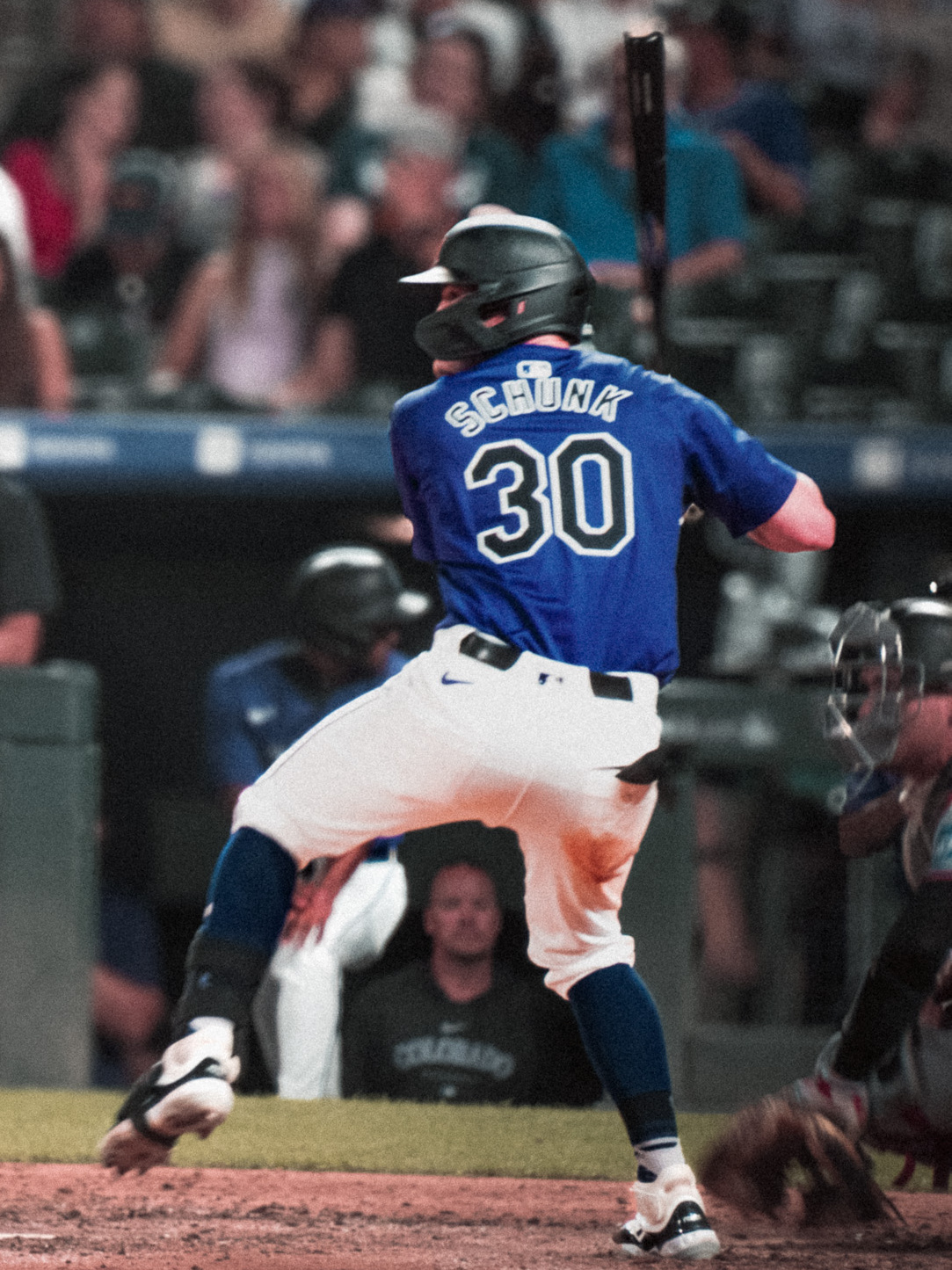
- Schunk with the Colorado Rockies in 2024

Lancaster Stormers
- Infielder
- Born: July 24, 1997 (age 29); Atlanta, Georgia, U.S.
- Bats: Right Throws: Right

MLB debut
- June 29, 2024, for the Colorado Rockies

MLB statistics (through 2025 season)
- Batting average: .222
- Home runs: 2
- Runs batted in: 7
- Stats at Baseball Reference

Teams
- Colorado Rockies (2024–2025)

Aaron Livingston Schunk (born July 24, 1997) is an American professional baseball infielder for the Lancaster Stormers of the Atlantic League of Professional Baseball. He has previously played in Major League Baseball (MLB) for the Colorado Rockies. He made his MLB debut in 2024.

== Amateur career ==
Schunk graduated from Lovett School in Atlanta, Georgia. He attended the University of Georgia, where he played college baseball for the Georgia Bulldogs. As a freshman in 2017, he slashed .290/.319/.371 (.693 OPS) with one home run.

In 2018, he continued as the Bulldogs’ third baseman and closer, and finished the season with a .299/.340/.411 slashline (.750 OPS) and three home runs. That summer, he played collegiate summer baseball with the Harwich Mariners of the Cape Cod Baseball League. He was named a league all-star.

Schunk played his final season with the Bulldogs in 2019. He slashed .399/.373/.600 (.973 OPS) with 15 home runs. He also won the John Olerud Award.

== Professional career ==
=== Colorado Rockies ===
The Colorado Rockies drafted Schunk in the second round, with the 62nd overall selection, of the 2019 Major League Baseball draft. He received just over $1.1 million as a signing bonus. He made his professional debut with the Boise Hawks of the Low-A Northwest League. Over 46 games, he slashed .306/.370/.503 with six home runs and 23 RBI. Schunk did not play in 2020 due to the cancellation of the minor league season because of the COVID-19 pandemic.

In 2021, Schunk played with the Spokane Indians of the High-A West, slashing .223/.286/.346 with eight home runs, 45 RBI, and 13 stolen bases over 89 games. Schunk began the 2022 campaign with the Double-A Hartford Yard Goats, hitting .258/.316/.427 with 14 home runs, and 77 RBI across 122 appearances. In 2023, he played for the Triple-A Albuquerque Isotopes, appearing in 116 games and batting .290/.350/.461 with 14 home runs, 77 RBI, and 12 stolen bases.

Schunk began the 2024 season with Albuquerque, hitting .291/.339/.469 with seven home runs, 43 RBI, and 11 stolen bases across 69 games. On June 28, 2024, Schunk was selected to the 40-man roster and promoted to the major leagues for the first time. For the rest of the season, Schunk played in 39 games with 98 plate appearances for Colorado. He finished the major league season with a slash line of .234/.265/.330, two home runs, two doubles, and seven RBI.

Schunk was designated for assignment by the Rockies following the signing of Scott Alexander on February 19, 2025. After he cleared waivers, the Rockies sent Schunk outright to Triple-A on February 21. On April 19, the Rockies selected Schunk's contract, adding him back to their active roster. In 11 appearances for Colorado, he went 6-for-28 (.214). Schunk was designated for assignment following the promotion of Keston Hiura on May 31. He cleared waivers and was sent outright to Albuquerque on June 2. On August 8, the Rockies added Schunk back to their active roster. He made 16 total appearances for Colorado, batting .188/.188/.219. On October 31, the Rockies removed Schunk from their 40-man roster and sent him outright to Albuquerque; he subsequently rejected the assignment and elected free agency.

=== Atlanta Braves ===
On December 16, 2025, Schunk signed a minor league contract with the Atlanta Braves. In 87 appearances for the Triple–A Gwinnett Stripers, he batted .237/.305/.367 with six home runs, 43 RBI, and nine stolen bases. Schunk was released by the Braves organization on July 27, 2026.

=== Lancaster Stormers ===
On August 4, 2026, Schunk signed with the Lancaster Stormers of the Atlantic League of Professional Baseball.
