= Bradley Blalock =

American baseball player (born 2000)

Hanshin Tigers
- Pitcher
- Born: December 25, 2000 (age 25); Conyers, Georgia, U.S.
- Bats: Right Throws: Right

MLB debut
- June 20, 2024, for the Milwaukee Brewers

MLB statistics (through 2026 season)
- Win–loss record: 3–9
- Earned run average: 7.87
- Strikeouts: 59
- Stats at Baseball Reference

Teams
- Milwaukee Brewers (2024); Colorado Rockies (2024–2025); Miami Marlins (2026)

Bradley Christopher Blalock (BLAY-lock, born December 25, 2000) is an American professional baseball pitcher for the Hanshin Tigers of Nippon Professional Baseball (NPB). He has previously played in Major League Baseball (MLB) for the Milwaukee Brewers, Colorado Rockies and Miami Marlins.

== Career ==
=== Boston Red Sox ===
Blalock attended Grayson High School in Loganville, Georgia. He was high school teammates with fellow future Major League Baseball (MLB) player Parker Meadows. The Boston Red Sox drafted Blalock in the 32nd round, with the 977th overall selection of the 2019 MLB draft. He made his professional debut with the rookie-level Gulf Coast League Red Sox, logging a 6.75 ERA in 4 games (3 starts). He did not play in a game in 2020 due to the cancellation of the minor league season because of the COVID-19 pandemic.

Blalock spent the 2021 campaign with the Single-A Salem Red Sox, making 23 starts and compiling a 3–6 record and 4.27 ERA with 85 strikeouts over 86 1/3 innings pitched. He underwent Tommy John surgery in March 2022 and missed the entirety of the season as a result. Blalock began the 2023 season in late May with Salem and was promoted to the High-A Greenville Drive after four starts. In seven starts for Greenville, he recorded a 5–1 record and 2.55 ERA with 36 strikeouts across 35 1/3 innings pitched.

=== Milwaukee Brewers ===
On August 1, 2023, the Red Sox traded Blalock to the Milwaukee Brewers for Luis Urías. Blalock made 4 starts for the High-A Wisconsin Timber Rattlers, posting a 5.27 ERA with 17 strikeouts across 13 2/3 innings. His season ended when he went on the disabled list on August 28 with a strained oblique muscle. On November 13, the Brewers added Blalock to their 40-man roster to protect him from the Rule 5 draft.

Blalock was optioned to the Double-A Biloxi Shuckers to begin the 2024 season. In 7 starts for Biloxi, he recorded a 2.27 ERA with 29 strikeouts across 35 2/3 innings pitched. On May 20, Blalock was promoted to the major leagues for the first time. However, he did not play in a game and was optioned back to Biloxi on May 24, briefly becoming a phantom ballplayer. On June 19, Blalock was promoted to the major leagues again, and he made his MLB debut the following day. After pitching one scoreless inning against the San Diego Padres, he returned to the minors.

=== Colorado Rockies ===
On July 27, 2024, Milwaukee traded Blalock and Yujanyer Herrera to the Colorado Rockies in exchange for Nick Mears. Blalock made his Rockies debut on August 12 against the Arizona Diamondbacks. Over 5 2/3 innings, he gave up six hits, three runs, and struck out four. On August 24, Blalock earned his first career win against the eventual American League champion New York Yankees. Through the rest of the season, Blalock made six appearances, finishing the season with a 5.87 ERA in 30 2/3 innings pitched.

Blalock began the 2025 season in the Rockies' bullpen before being sent down to Triple-A on April 6, 2025. He returned to the Rockies briefly in late April, then again on May 2, joining the starting rotation. He gave up 12 runs in 3 2/3 innings in a 21–0 loss to the San Diego Padres on May 10, after which he returned to the minors. He came back to the majors in July, making six starts for the Rockies, including throwing six scoreless innings against the Cleveland Guardians on July 28. He was sent down to Triple-A again in August before being promoted again in September, ending the season in the rotation. Blalock logged a 2–6 record with a 9.36 ERA in 14 games, striking out 27 and walking 23 batters in 58 2/3 innings.

On January 15, 2026, Blalock was designated for assignment by the Rockies following the signing of Michael Lorenzen.

=== Miami Marlins ===
On January 20, 2026, Blalock was traded to the Miami Marlins in exchange for Jake Brooks. Blalock was optioned to the Triple-A Jacksonville Jumbo Shrimp to begin the regular season.

On November 3, 2026, the Marlins released Blalock.

=== Hanshin Tigers ===
On November 5, 2026, Blalock signed with the Hanshin Tigers of Nippon Professional Baseball.

== Pitch arsenal ==
Blacklock has a five-pitch mix: four-seam fastball, slider, splitter, curveball, and cutter. In 2024, he relied primarily on his four-seamer, using his splitter as a put-away pitch, modeled after Kevin Gausman’s split-change.
