= Luis Peralta (baseball) =

Dominican baseball player (born 2001)

Free agent
- Pitcher
- Born: January 6, 2001 (age 25); Moca, Dominican Republic
- Bats: Left Throws: Left

MLB debut
- August 24, 2024, for the Colorado Rockies

MLB statistics (through 2025 season)
- Win–loss record: 1–3
- Earned run average: 6.03
- Strikeouts: 30
- Stats at Baseball Reference

Teams
- Colorado Rockies (2024–2025)

Luis David Peralta Díaz (born January 6, 2001) is a Dominican professional baseball pitcher who is a free agent. He has previously played in Major League Baseball (MLB) for the Colorado Rockies.

== Career ==
=== Pittsburgh Pirates ===
Peralta signed with Pittsburgh Pirates as an international free agent on July 3, 2017. He made his professional debut in 2018 with the Dominican Summer League Pirates. Peralta returned to the club in 2019, posting a 2–2 record and 2.01 ERA with 34 strikeouts across 14 appearances (6 starts). He did not play in a game in 2020 due to the cancellation of the minor league season because of the COVID-19 pandemic.

Peralta returned to action in 2021 with the rookie–level Florida Complex League Pirates. In 9 games (7 starts), he compiled an 0–3 record and 3.41 ERA with 36 strikeouts across 29 innings pitched. Peralta spent the next two seasons with the Single–A Bradenton Marauders. In 2022, he struggled to an 0–7 record and 6.41 ERA with 97 strikeouts over 19 games (18 starts). In 2023, Peralta posted an 0–3 record and 4.96 ERA with 67 strikeouts across 23 appearances.

Peralta began the 2024 season with the High–A Greensboro Grasshoppers, recording an 0.60 ERA with 50 strikeouts and 3 saves over 19 appearances out of the bullpen. Following a promotion to the Double–A Altoona Curve, he logged a 1.86 ERA with 14 strikeouts and 2 saves across 7 outings.

=== Colorado Rockies ===
On July 29, 2024, the Pirates traded Peralta to the Colorado Rockies in exchange for Jalen Beeks. On August 23, Peralta was selected to the 40-man roster and promoted to the major leagues for the first time, where he retired the first two batters he faced. He made 15 appearances for Colorado during his rookie campaign, recording an 0.73 ERA with 14 strikeouts across 12 1/3 innings pitched.

Peralta pitched in 22 games for the Rockies during the 2025 campaign, he struggled to a 1–3 record and 9.47 ERA with 16 strikeouts over 19 innings of work.

Peralta was optioned to the Triple-A Albuquerque Isotopes to begin the 2026 season. In six appearances (one start) for Albuquerque, he struggled to an 0–2 record and 17.18 ERA with 14 strikeouts across 7 1/3 innings pitched. On April 21, 2026, Peralta was designated for assignment by Colorado.

=== Chicago Cubs ===
On April 27, 2026, Peralta was claimed off of waivers by the St. Louis Cardinals. He did not make an appearance for the organization prior to being designated for assignment on May 1. On May 3, Peralta was claimed off of waivers by the Chicago Cubs. Peralta was designated for assignment by Chicago on June 20, following the acquisition of Jayden Murray. He cleared waivers and was sent outright to the Triple-A Iowa Cubs on June 24. In 30 games with Triple-A Iowa Cubs he threw 35.2 innings of relief going 1-4 with a 7.07 ERA with 51 strikeouts and 3 saves. He elected free agency on November 2.

== Personal life ==
Peralta's brother, Freddy, is also a professional baseball pitcher.
