= Anthony Molina (baseball) =

Venezuelan baseball player (born 2002)

San Francisco Giants – No. 45
- Pitcher
- Born: January 12, 2002 (age 24); San Joaquín, Carabobo, Venezuela
- Bats: Right Throws: Right

MLB debut
- March 28, 2024, for the Colorado Rockies

MLB statistics (through 2026 season)
- Win–loss record: 5–4
- Earned run average: 6.17
- Strikeouts: 96
- Stats at Baseball Reference

Teams
- Colorado Rockies (2024–2025); Atlanta Braves (2026); San Francisco Giants (2026–present)
Medals
Men's baseball
Representing Venezuela
World Baseball Classic
Gold medal – first place	2026 Miami	Team

Anthony José Molina (born January 12, 2002) is a Venezuelan professional baseball pitcher for the San Francisco Giants of Major League Baseball (MLB). He has previously played in MLB for the Colorado Rockies and Atlanta Braves. He made his MLB debut in 2024.

== Career ==
=== Tampa Bay Rays ===
On July 2, 2018, Molina signed with the Tampa Bay Rays as an international free agent. He made his professional debut the following year, logging a 3.23 ERA in 14 games for the Dominican Summer League Rays. Molina did not play in a game in 2020 due to the cancellation of the minor league season because of the COVID-19 pandemic.

He returned to action in 2021 with the rookie–level Florida Complex League Rays. In 12 appearances, Molina pitched to a 2.61 ERA with 36 strikeouts and 2 saves across 31 innings. In 2022, he made 29 appearances split between the Single–A Charleston RiverDogs and High–A Bowling Green Hot Rods, accumulating a 14–2 record and 3.10 ERA with 85 strikeouts in 95 2/3 innings pitched.

Molina split the 2023 season between the Double–A Montgomery Biscuits and Triple–A Durham Bulls. Working primarily as a starting pitcher, he made 28 appearances (27 starts) and registered a 5–7 record and 4.50 ERA with 102 strikeouts across 122 innings of work.

=== Colorado Rockies ===
On December 6, 2023, the Rockies selected Molina from the Rays in the Rule 5 draft. After competing for a spot on Colorado's Opening Day roster during spring training, the team announced that he had made the roster. Molina made his MLB debut on March 28, 2024, which was Opening Day. In 35 appearances for Colorado during his rookie campaign, he struggled to a 6.79 ERA with 41 strikeouts across 59 2/3 innings pitched.

Molina was optioned to the Triple-A Albuquerque Isotopes to begin the 2025 season. He appeared in 17 games for Colorado during the year, posting a 1–1 record and 7.27 ERA with 24 strikeouts across 34 2/3 innings pitched.

=== Atlanta Braves ===
On December 5, 2025, Molina was claimed off waivers by the Atlanta Braves. On December 19, Molina was removed from the 40-man roster and sent outright to the Triple-A Gwinnett Stripers. He began the 2026 season with Triple–A Gwinnett, pitching in five contests and registering a 4.50 ERA with ten strikeouts across 14 innings pitched. On May 1, 2026, the Braves selected Molina's contract, adding him to their active roster. In three appearances for Atlanta, he posted a 5.40 ERA with two strikeouts over five innings.

=== San Francisco Giants ===
On August 2, 2026, the Braves traded Molina to the San Francisco Giants in exchange for Tyler Mahle. He was recalled up to the team for the first time on August 24.

== See also ==
- Rule 5 draft results
