= Ryan Ritter =

American baseball player (born 2000)

Colorado Rockies – No. 8
- Infielder
- Born: November 10, 2000 (age 25); Evergreen Park, Illinois, U.S.
- Bats: Right Throws: Right

MLB debut
- June 6, 2025, for the Colorado Rockies

MLB statistics (through 2026 season)
- Batting average: .233
- Home runs: 1
- Runs batted in: 19
- Stats at Baseball Reference

Teams
- Colorado Rockies (2025–present)

Ryan Michael Ritter (born November 10, 2000) is an American professional baseball infielder for the Colorado Rockies of Major League Baseball (MLB). He made his MLB debut in 2025.

== Amateur career ==
Ritter attended Lincoln-Way East High School in Frankfort, Illinois, graduating in 2019. He was selected by the Chicago Cubs in the 33rd round of the 2019 Major League Baseball draft but did not sign. Ritter had committed to play college baseball at Austin Peay State University, but instead enrolled at John A. Logan College. He played in 21 games in the shortened season, hitting .342. After the season, he transferred to the University of Kentucky. For the 2021 season, he started 52 games and batted .275 with three home runs and twenty RBI. In 2020, he played collegiate summer baseball with the Fond du Lac Dock Spiders of the Northwoods League, and in 2021 with the Cotuit Kettleers of the Cape Cod Baseball League. For the 2022 season, Ritter played in 59 games and hit .283 with eight home runs and 36 RBI. He was awarded the ABCA/Rawlings Gold Glove Award for shortstop.

== Professional career ==
The Colorado Rockies selected Ritter in the fourth round, with the 116th overall pick, in the 2022 Major League Baseball draft. He signed for $530,000. Ritter made his professional debut with the Rookie-level Arizona Complex League Rockies and hit .320 over eight games.

Ritter opened the 2023 season with the Single-A Fresno Grizzlies. In early July, he was promoted to the High-A Spokane Indians. In early September, Ritter was promoted to the Double-A Hartford Yard Goats. With Fresno, he was selected for the 2023 California League Most Valuable Player Award. Over 119 games between the three teams, Ritter slashed .281/.383/.519 with 24 home runs, 85 RBI, and twenty stolen bases. He was assigned to Hartford for the 2024 season and hit .270 with seven home runs and 32 RBI over 91 games. He missed time during the season due to an ankle injury. Ritter began the 2025 season with the Triple-A Albuquerque Isotopes, playing in 52 games and batting .305/.413/.635 with 16 home runs, 45 RBI, and three stolen bases.

On June 6, 2025, Ritter was selected to the 40-man roster and promoted to the major leagues for the first time. He made his MLB debut that day at Coors Field and recorded his first major league hit, a triple, off Kodai Senga of the New York Mets. On July 12, Ritter hit his first career home run off Brady Singer of the Cincinnati Reds. On July 20, the Rockies placed Ritter on the injured list with a right middle finger laceration. He was activated on August 15. Ritter played the remainder of the season with the Rockies following his promotion, splitting time at shortstop and second base, and hit .241 with one home run and 18 RBI across 60 games.

Ritter was named to his first Opening Day roster as a utility player to begin the 2026 season. He started the season 1-for-7 and the Rockies optioned him to Albuquerque on April 2. Ritter was recalled on August 23. He appeared in 16 games for the Rockies and batted .158 with one RBI. With Albuquerque, he played in 60 games and hit .323 with five home runs and 27 RBI.
