= Dugan Darnell =

American baseball player (born 1997)

Free agent
- Pitcher
- Born: June 26, 1997 (age 28); Northville, Michigan, U.S.
- Bats: Left Throws: Right

MLB debut
- August 1, 2025, for the Colorado Rockies

MLB statistics (through 2025 season)
- Win–loss record: 1–0
- Earned run average: 3.86
- Strikeouts: 5
- Stats at Baseball Reference

Teams
- Colorado Rockies (2025)

Dugan Tate Darnell (born June 26, 1997) is an American professional baseball pitcher who is a free agent. He has previously played in Major League Baseball (MLB) for the Colorado Rockies.

== Career ==
=== Early career ===
Darnell attended Northville High School in Northville, Michigan, and played college baseball at Adrian College. Until his senior year at Adrian, Darnell had been the team's starting third baseman. While playing in the Great Lakes Summer Collegiate League the summer before his senior year, Darnell's teammates encouraged him to try throwing from the pitcher's mound. The ballpark's radar gun registered all five of his pitches in the mid-to-low 90s. When he returned to Adrian for his senior year, he began pitching and set the school's single-season saves record. After college, he signed with the Eastside Diamond Hoppers of the United Shore Professional Baseball League (USPBL) in 2019 and pitched with them for two years.

=== Colorado Rockies ===
On February 6, 2021, Darnell signed a minor league contract with the Colorado Rockies. He split his first season with the organization between the Single-A Fresno Grizzlies and High-A Spokane Indians, accumulating a 4-3 record and 1.95 ERA with 80 strikeouts and 15 saves across 36 appearances. Darnell made 38 appearances out of the bullpen for the Double-A Hartford Yard Goats in 2022, registering a 4-1 record and 5.29 ERA with 68 strikeouts across 47 2/3 innings pitched.

Darnell split the 2023 campaign between Hartford and the Triple-A Albuquerque Isotopes. In 40 relief outings for the two affiliates, he posted a cumulative 8-1 record and 3.64 ERA with 65 strikeouts and seven saves across 54 1/3 innings pitched. In 2024, Darnell made 43 total appearances (one start) for Hartford and Albuquerque, accumulating an 0-1 record and 5.08 ERA with 56 strikeouts and one save.

Darnell began the 2025 season with Triple-A Albuquerque, posting a 5-2 record and 3.19 ERA with 63 strikeouts and one save across 53 2/3 innings of work. On August 1, 2025, Darnell was selected to the 40-man roster and promoted to the major leagues for the first time. In nine appearances for Colorado, he posted a 1-0 record and 3.66 ERA with five strikeouts across 11 2/3 innings pitched. Darnell was placed on the injured list on August 22, and was transferred to the 60-day IL two days later, ending his season; the move was made as the result of a torn left hip labrum that required surgery.

=== Detroit Tigers ===
On October 31, 2025, Darnell was claimed off waivers by the Pittsburgh Pirates. On November 6, he was designated for assignment by the Pirates. On November 12, Darnell was claimed off waivers by the Detroit Tigers. He was designated for assignment by the Tigers on November 18. On November 21, he was non-tendered by Detroit and became a free agent. Darnell re-signed with the Tigers organization on a minor league contract on December 15.

Darnell was released by the Tigers organization on June 3, 2026, having spent the entirety of the year on the injured list to that point.
