= Angel Chivilli =

Dominican baseball player (born 2002)

New York Yankees – No. 57
- Pitcher
- Born: July 28, 2002 (age 24); La Victoria, Dominican Republic
- Bats: Right Throws: Right

MLB debut
- June 3, 2024, for the Colorado Rockies

MLB statistics (through 2026 season)
- Win–loss record: 4–9
- Earned run average: 5.80
- Strikeouts: 87
- Stats at Baseball Reference

Teams
- Colorado Rockies (2024–2025); New York Yankees (2026–present)

Angel Chivilli (born July 28, 2002) is a Dominican professional baseball pitcher for the New York Yankees of Major League Baseball (MLB). He has previously played in MLB for the Colorado Rockies.

== Career ==
=== Colorado Rockies ===
Chivilli signed with the Colorado Rockies as an international free agent on July 30, 2018, receiving a $200,000 signing bonus. He made his professional debut in 2019 with the Dominican Summer League (DSL) Rockies. He did not play in a game in 2020 due to the cancellation of the minor league season because of the COVID-19 pandemic.

Chivilli returned to the DSL Rockies in 2021, recording a 3.49 ERA and 45 strikeouts across 11 games (8 starts). He split the 2022 campaign between the rookie-level Arizona Complex League Rockies and Single-A Fresno Grizzlies. In 32 games out of the bullpen for the two affiliates, Chivilli accumulated a 2.21 ERA with 10 saves and 51 strikeouts across 40 2/3 innings pitched.

Chivilli spent 2023 with the High-A Spokane Indians and Double-A Hartford Yard Goats. He made 53 appearances for the two affiliates, compiling a 4–9 record and 5.61 ERA with 68 strikeouts and 17 saves. On November 14, 2023, the Rockies added Chivilli to their 40-man roster to protect him from the Rule 5 draft.

Chivilli was optioned to Double-A Hartford to begin the 2024 season. On May 3, Chivilli was promoted to the major leagues for the first time. He was optioned down to Hartford on May 6 without having appeared for Colorado, temporarily becoming a phantom ballplayer. On June 3, Chivilli was once more promoted to the major leagues. This time, he made his MLB debut. He was first Rockies pitcher to not issue a walk in his first 12 appearances. He earned his first MLB save on August 20. He finished his rookie season with a 2–3 record and 4.55 ERA in 31 2/3 innings.

On May 27, 2025, Chivilli was optioned to the Albuquerque Isotopes. He was called up for the first time in the 2025 season on June 3, although he would get optioned to the Triple-A Albuquerque Isotopes three times during the season. In 43 appearances for the Rockies, Chivilli had a 1–5 record, 7.06 ERA, and 43 strikeouts over 58 2/3 innings pitched.

=== New York Yankees ===
On January 28, 2026, Chivilli was traded to the New York Yankees in exchange for T. J. Rumfield. Chivilli was optioned to the Triple-A Scranton/Wilkes-Barre RailRiders to begin the regular season.
