= Carson Palmquist =

American baseball player (born 2000)

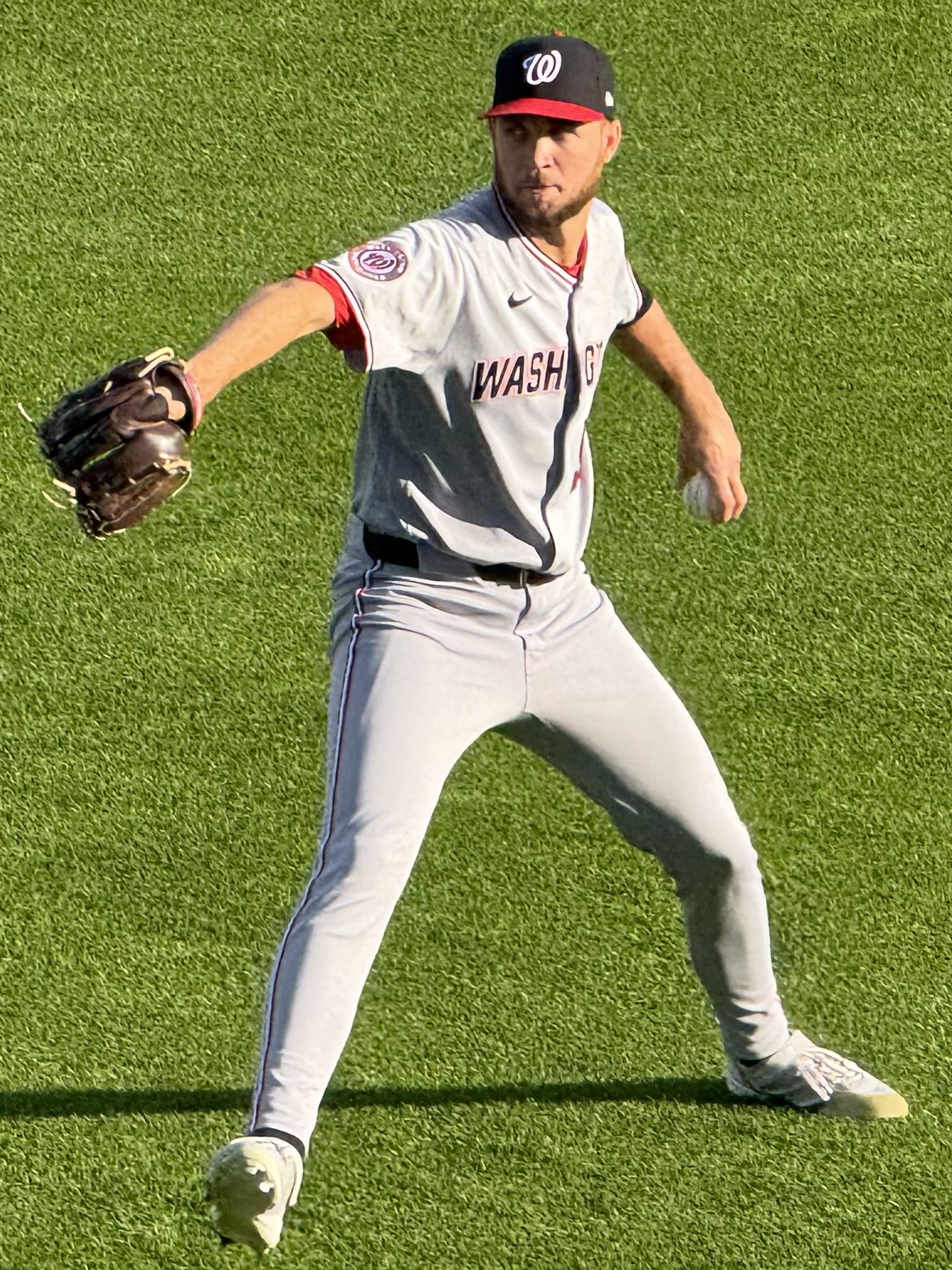
- Palmquist with the Nationals in 2026

Free agent
- Pitcher
- Born: October 17, 2000 (age 26); Fort Myers, Florida, U.S.
- Bats: Left Throws: Left

MLB debut
- May 16, 2025, for the Colorado Rockies

MLB statistics (through 2026 season)
- Win–loss record: 0–6
- Earned run average: 8.53
- Strikeouts: 42
- Stats at Baseball Reference

Teams
- Colorado Rockies (2025); Washington Nationals (2026)

Carson James Palmquist (born October 17, 2000) is an American professional baseball pitcher who is a free agent. He has previously played in Major League Baseball (MLB) for the Colorado Rockies and Washington Nationals. He made his MLB debut in 2025.

== Amateur career ==
Palmquist attended Riverdale High School in Fort Myers, Florida. As a senior in 2019, he did not allow an earned run and struck out 106 batters over 60 2/3 innings. Although he was scouted by major league teams, he went unselected in the 2019 Major League Baseball draft and enrolled at the University of Miami to play college baseball.

As a freshman at Miami in 2020, Palmquist went 1–0 with a 2.31 ERA and 15 strikeouts over 11 2/3 innings before the season was cancelled due to the COVID-19 pandemic. As a redshirt freshman in 2021, Palmquist was named Miami's closer. He made 25 appearances in which he went 1–1 with a 2.22 ERA, 75 strikeouts, and 14 saves over 44 2/3 innings. His 14 saves were third best in college baseball. He was named to the USA Baseball National Collegiate Team after the season. For the 2022 season, Palmquist moved into the starting rotation. Over 16 starts, he went 9–4 with a 3.54 ERA and 118 strikeouts over 84 innings. Following the season's end, he traveled to San Diego where he participated in the Draft Combine.

== Professional career ==
=== Colorado Rockies ===
Palmquist was drafted by the Colorado Rockies in the third round with the 88th overall selection of the 2022 Major League Baseball draft. He signed with the team for $775,000. He made his professional debut with the Rookie-level Arizona Complex League Rockies, pitching a total of one inning for the season.

To open the 2023 season, Palmquist was assigned to the Spokane Indians of the High-A Northwest League. In mid-August, he was promoted to the Hartford Yard Goats of the Double-A Eastern League. Over 19 starts between the two teams, he went 7–4 with a 3.90 ERA and 134 strikeouts over 92 1/3 innings. Palmquist was assigned to Hartford to open the 2024 season. In early August, he was promoted to the Triple-A Albuquerque Isotopes. Over 27 starts between the two teams, Palmquist pitched to a 7–8 record, a 3.98 ERA and 144 strikeouts over 117 2/3 innings.

Palmquist began the 2025 campaign with Triple-A Albuquerque, logging a 2–2 record and 3.82 ERA with 45 strikeouts over his first seven starts. On May 16, 2025, Palmquist was selected to the 40-man roster and promoted to the major leagues for the first time. Palmquist made his MLB debut that same day as Colorado's starting pitcher versus the Arizona Diamondbacks at Chase Field, allowing five runs over four innings in an 8-0 loss. He was optioned and recalled multiple times throughout the season. Palmquist appeared in nine games (seven starts) for the Rockies and had a 0-4 record, an 8.91 ERA, 27 strikeouts and 25 walks over 34 1/3 innings. With Albuquerque, he pitched in 26 games and posted a 4–5 record and 4.64 ERA.

Palmquist was optioned to Triple-A Albuquerque to begin the 2026 season. He made 12 appearances (five starts) for Albuquerque, but struggled to a 1–3 record and 7.20 ERA with 24 strikeouts over 25 innings of work. On May 21, 2026, Palmquist was designated for assignment by the Rockies.

=== Washington Nationals ===
On May 25, 2026 the Rockies traded Palmquist to the Washington Nationals in exchange for cash considerations. He was assigned to the Triple-A Rochester Red Wings, and was recalled by the Nationals for the first time on June 24. Palmquist pitched in a total of 11 games (six starts) for Washington and ended the season with a 0–2 record, a 7.11 ERA and 15 strikeouts over 16 1/3 innings. The Nationals designated Palmquist for assignment on November 17, 2026. Three days later, he was non-tendered and became a free agent.
