= Alan Trejo =

American baseball player (born 1996)

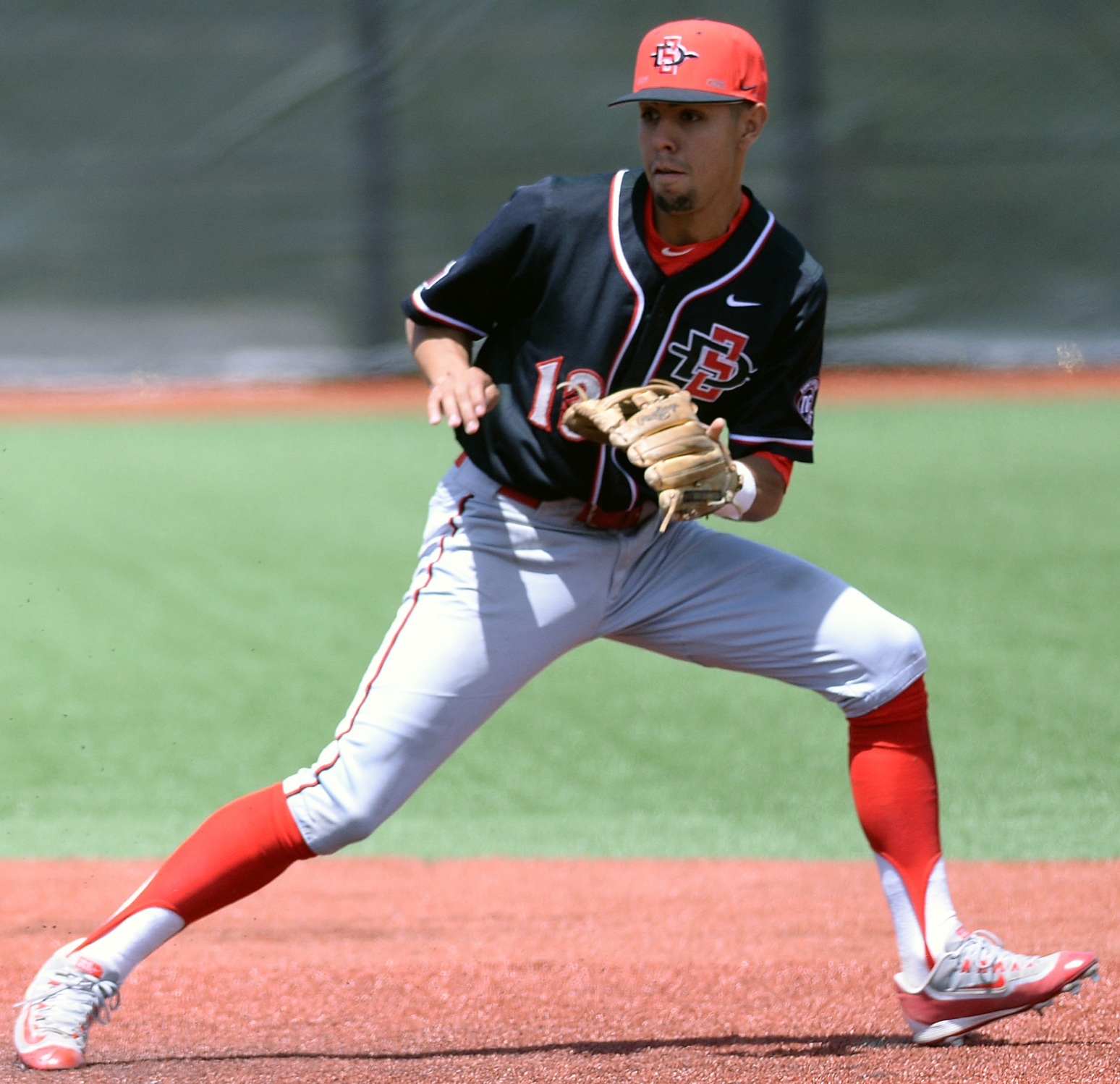
- Trejo with San Diego State in 2017

Acereros de Monclova – No. 13
- Shortstop / Second baseman
- Born: May 30, 1996 (age 30); Downey, California, U.S.
- Bats: Right Throws: Right

MLB debut
- April 10, 2021, for the Colorado Rockies

MLB statistics (through 2025 season)
- Batting average: .224
- Home runs: 9
- Runs batted in: 48
- Stats at Baseball Reference

Teams
- Colorado Rockies (2021–2025)
Medals
Men's baseball
Representing Mexico
World Baseball Classic
| Bronze medal – third place | 2023 Miami | Team |

Alan Ray Trejo (born May 30, 1996) is an American professional baseball infielder for the Acereros de Monclova of the Mexican League. He has previously played in Major League Baseball (MLB) for the Colorado Rockies. He was drafted in the 16th round of the 2017 MLB draft by the Rockies and made his MLB debut for them in 2021. He played for the Mexico national team in the 2023 World Baseball Classic.

== Career ==
=== Amateur career ===
Trejo attended Cathedral High School in Los Angeles, and transferred to Warren High School in Downey, California where his father is a current Math teacher. He enrolled at San Diego State University and played college baseball for the San Diego State Aztecs. He was selected by the Colorado Rockies in the 16th round of the 2017 Major League Baseball draft.

=== Colorado Rockies ===
Trejo played 2017 with the rookie–level Grand Junction Rockies, batting .347/.388/.566 with seven home runs and 32 RBI. The next year he played with the High–A Lancaster JetHawks, with a batting line of .278/.329/.425 with 10 home runs and a career-high 67 RBI. Trejo spent the 2019 season with the Double-A Hartford Yard Goats, slashing .243/.290/.391 with 15 home runs and 39 RBI in 125 games.

Trejo did not play in a game in 2020 due to the cancellation of the minor league season because of the COVID-19 pandemic. He was added to the Rockies’ 60-man player pool for the 2020 season. He was invited to Spring Training for the 2021 season, but did not make the team and was assigned to the Triple-A Albuquerque Isotopes to begin the season.

On April 10, 2021, Trejo was selected to the 40-man roster and promoted to the major leagues for the first time. He made his MLB debut that day as a pinch hitter in the 9th inning, flying out to Mauricio Dubón in his only at-bat. He appeared in 28 games in his rookie campaign, hitting .217/.260/.326 with one home run and three RBI.

On June 28, 2022, Trejo hit a walk-off grand slam off of Jon Olczak of the Sugar Land Space Cowboys to help Albuquerque win, 11–9. The slam was the first walk-off grand slam in Isotopes history. In 35 games for Colorado, he hit .271/.312/.424 with four home runs and 17 RBI. Trejo played in 82 games for the Rockies in 2023, hitting .232/.288/.343 with four home runs and 26 RBI. He was outrighted to the minor leagues on January 5, 2024, and removed from the 40-man roster.

On March 26, 2024, manager Bud Black announced that Trejo would have his contract selected after making the Opening Day roster. In 28 games for Colorado, he batted .143/.182/.143 with one RBI. Trejo was designated for assignment on June 28. He elected free agency the following day.

=== Los Angeles Dodgers ===
On July 2, 2024, Trejo signed a minor league contract with the Los Angeles Dodgers and was assigned to the Triple–A Oklahoma City Baseball Club. In 59 games, he batted .265 with six home runs and 24 RBI. Trejo elected free agency following the season on November 4.

=== Texas Rangers ===
On December 19, 2024, Trejo signed a minor league contract with the Texas Rangers. He made 19 appearances for the Triple-A Round Rock Express in 2025, batting .211/.247/.352 with 13 RBI and one stolen base.

=== Colorado Rockies (second stint) ===
On April 26, 2025, Trejo was traded to the Colorado Rockies in exchange for cash considerations. The following day, the Rockies selected Trejo's contract, adding him to their active roster. In 13 appearances for Colorado, he batted .175/.190/.225 with one RBI. Trejo was designated for assignment by the Rockies on May 16. He cleared waivers and elected free agency on May 18.

=== Texas Rangers (second stint) ===
On May 27, 2025, Trejo signed a minor league contract to return to the Texas Rangers organization. He made 93 appearances for the Triple-A Round Rock Express, batting .261/.323/.466 with 14 home runs and 65 RBI. Trejo elected free agency following the season on November 6.

=== Acereros de Monclova ===
On February 14, 2026, Trejo signed with the Acereros de Monclova of the Mexican League.
