= Tyler Freeman (baseball) =

American baseball player (born 1999)

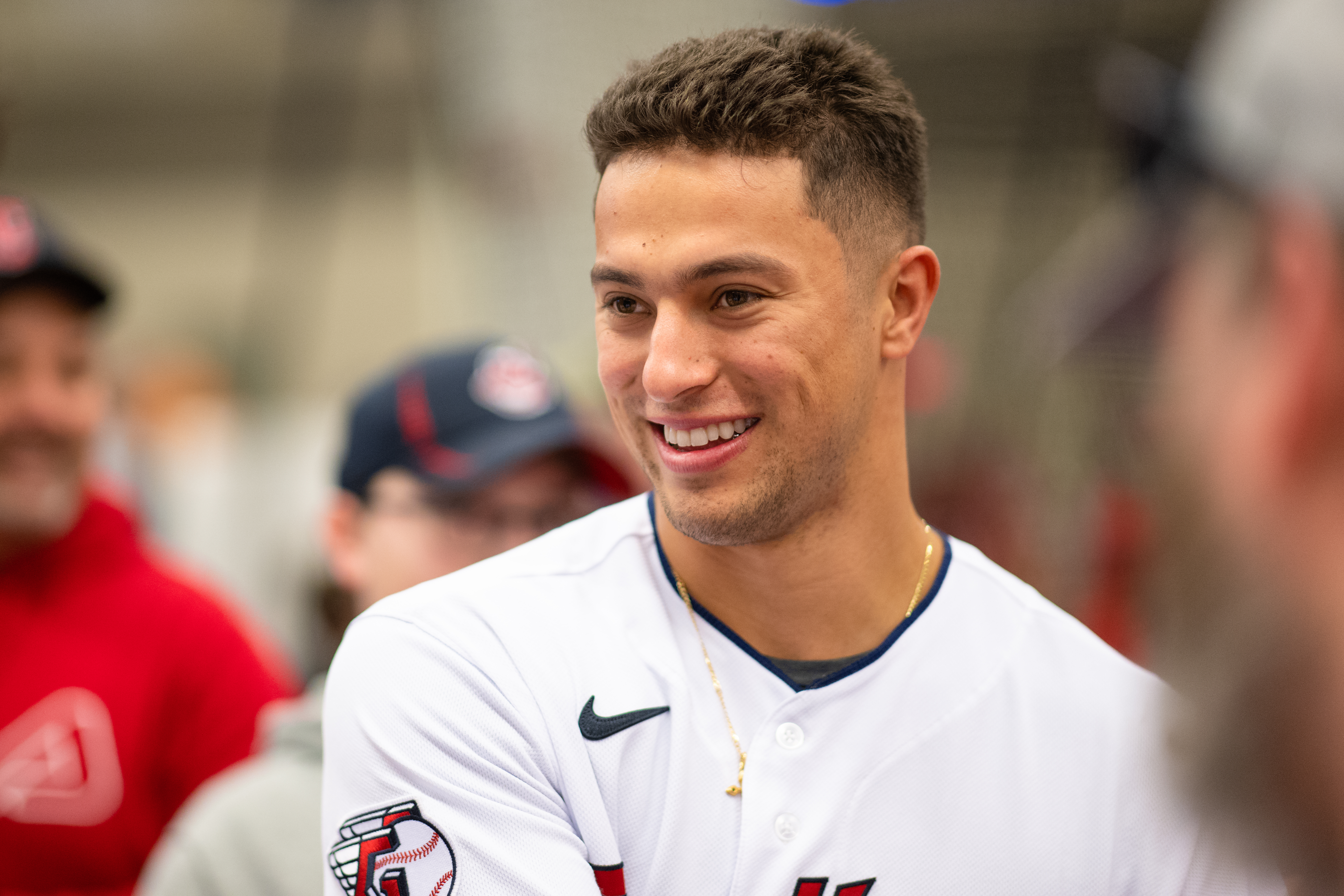
- Freeman with the Cleveland Guardians in 2023

Atlanta Braves
- Outfielder
- Born: May 21, 1999 (age 27); Rancho Cucamonga, California, U.S.
- Bats: Right Throws: Right

MLB debut
- August 3, 2022, for the Cleveland Guardians

MLB statistics (through 2026 season)
- Batting average: .247
- Home runs: 16
- Runs batted in: 107
- Stats at Baseball Reference

Teams
- Cleveland Guardians (2022–2024); Colorado Rockies (2025–2026)

Tyler Andrew Freeman (born May 21, 1999) is an American professional baseball outfielder in the Atlanta Braves organization. He has previously played in Major League Baseball (MLB) for the Cleveland Guardians and Colorado Rockies. He made his MLB debut in 2022.

== Amateur career ==
Freeman attended Etiwanda High School in Etiwanda, California. As a senior in 2017, he hit .526 with four home runs, 36 runs batted in, and 18 stolen bases. He played two seasons of high school baseball with his younger brother, Cody, who also later played in Major League Baseball.

== Professional career ==
=== Cleveland Indians / Guardians ===
The Cleveland Indians selected Freeman in the second round with the 71st pick of the 2017 Major League Baseball draft. He signed with the Indians for $816,500, the slot value for that pick, forgoing his commitment to play college baseball for the TCU Horned Frogs. Freeman made his professional debut that summer with the Arizona League Indians, batting .297 in 36 games.

Freeman played the 2018 season with the Mahoning Valley Scrappers, slashing .352/.405/.511 with two home runs, 38 runs batted in, and 14 stolen bases in 72 games, earning New York-Penn League All-Star honors. He started 2019 with the Lake County Captains, with whom he was named a Midwest League All-Star, before being promoted to the Lynchburg Hillcats in June. Over 123 games between both teams, Freeman batted .306/.368/.410 with three home runs, 44 runs batted in, and 19 stolen bases.

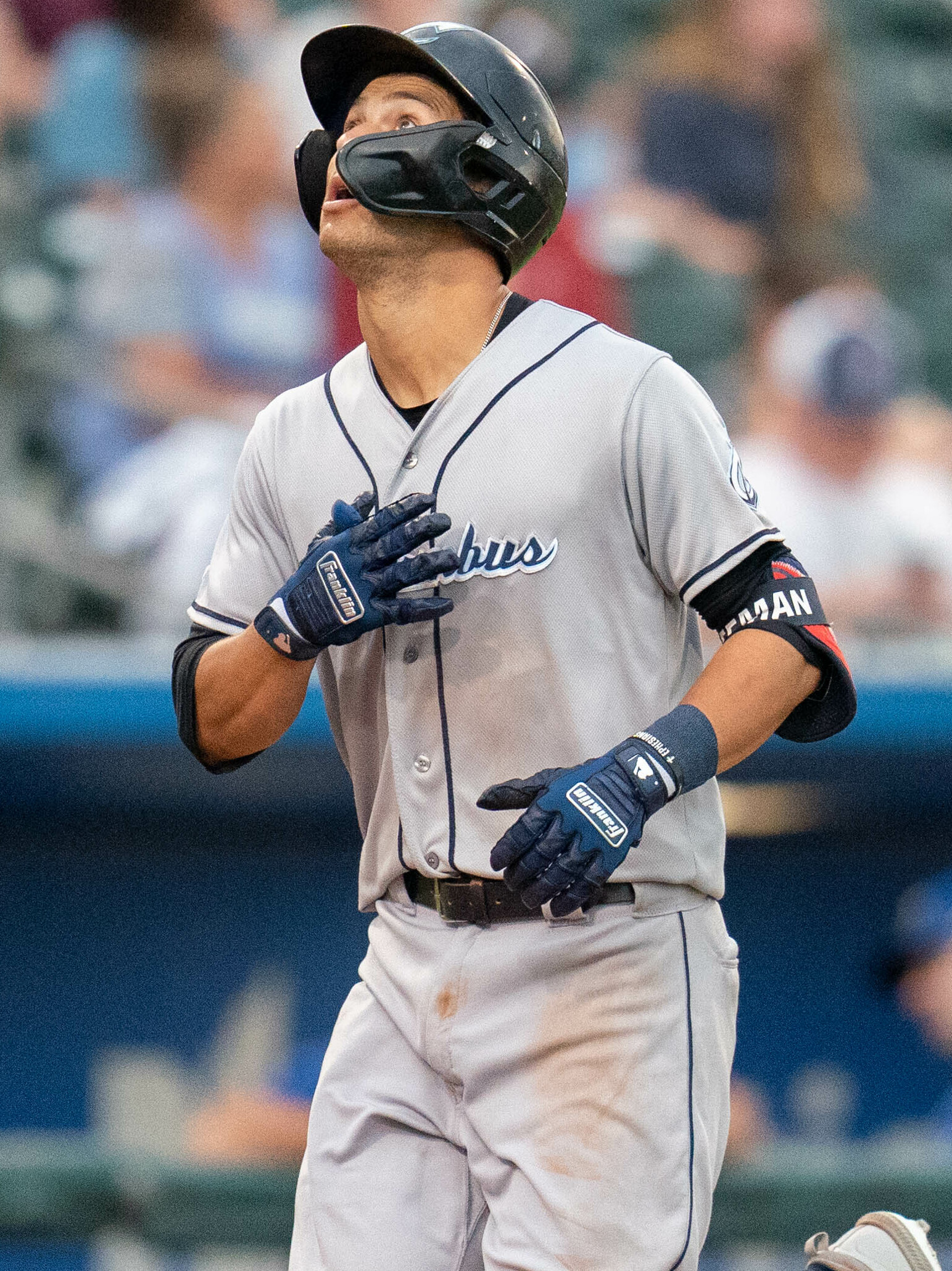
Freeman with the Columbus Clippers in 2022

Freeman did not play a minor league game in 2020 due to the cancellation of the minor league season caused by the COVID-19 pandemic. In 2021, Freeman hit .323/.372/.470 in 41 games for the Double-A Akron RubberDucks. On August 9, he underwent season-ending surgery on his left shoulder.

The newly named Cleveland Guardians selected Freeman to their 40-man roster on November 19, 2021. He was assigned to the Triple-A Columbus Clippers to begin the 2022 season.

The Guardians recalled Freeman from the minor leagues on August 3, 2022. He made his major league debut that day, starting at third base. In his debut, Freeman collected his first career hit, a single off Kevin Ginkel of the Arizona Diamondbacks. Appearing in 24 games in his rookie campaign, Freeman hit .247/.314/.286 with no home runs and 3 RBI.

Freeman was optioned to Triple-A Columbus to begin the 2023 season, with whom he batted .319/.457/.462, with 10 stolen bases without being caught. Freeman was recalled to the major leagues on May 6, replacing the struggling Oscar González. Freeman did not make an appearance until May 10, when he started at second base and went 2-for-4 with two singles in a loss to the Detroit Tigers. In 64 contests for Cleveland, he slashed .242/.295/.366 with four home runs, 18 RBI, and five stolen bases.

Freeman started in center field on Opening Day for Cleveland in 2024. He had his first four-hit game on May 18, with a double, stolen base, walk, and three RBIs. He played in 118 games for the Guardians during the season, batting .209/.305/.321 with seven home runs, 32 RBI, and 11 stolen bases. Although being recalled and activated for the playoffs, Freeman suffered a season ending torn oblique muscle during live at bats prior to Game 2 vs the Detroit Tigers and was later taken off the roster.

=== Colorado Rockies ===
On March 22, 2025, Freeman was traded to the Colorado Rockies in exchange for outfielder Nolan Jones.

After a slow start through late May and battling consistent playing time, Freeman recorded 44 hits over a 34-game span, raising his batting average from .189 to .345 by early July. In June, Freeman established several personal bests, including an eight-game hitting streak while slashing .306/.366/.468 over that stretch. Interim Rockies manager Warren Schaeffer commented on Freeman’s ability to put the ball in play, and Freeman noted that simplifying his approach focusing more on contact rather than trying to lift the ball helped stabilize his performance. On July 12, 2025, Freeman extended his on-base streak to 25 games, reaching base safely in 34 consecutive starts, highlighted by a walk and a single against the Cincinnati Reds. Freeman finished the season with career highs in hits, runs scored, doubles, on-base percentage, and stolen bases contributing offensively across 110 games with a .281 batting average, 18 stolen bases, .354 on-base percentage, 20 doubles, two triples, and two home runs over 377 at-bats.

Freeman missed time in 2026 due to injuries including a concussion and lumbar pain. He appeared in 79 games for the Rockies and batted .247 with three home runs and 23 RBI. On September 5, 2026, Freeman was removed from the 40–man roster and sent outright to the Triple–A Albuquerque Isotopes. He hit .306 with one home run across 23 games for the Isotopes. On October 15, Freeman elected free agency.

=== Atlanta Braves ===
On November 12, 2026, Freeman signed a minor league contract with the Atlanta Braves.

== Personal life ==
Tyler's younger brother, Cody, is also an MLB player. Their brother in law, Shane McGuire, is also a professional baseball player, reaching Triple-A in 2025.

As a child, Freeman's favorite team was the Los Angeles Dodgers, and his favorite players were Michael Young and Derek Jeter.
