= Drew Romo =

American baseball player (born 2001)

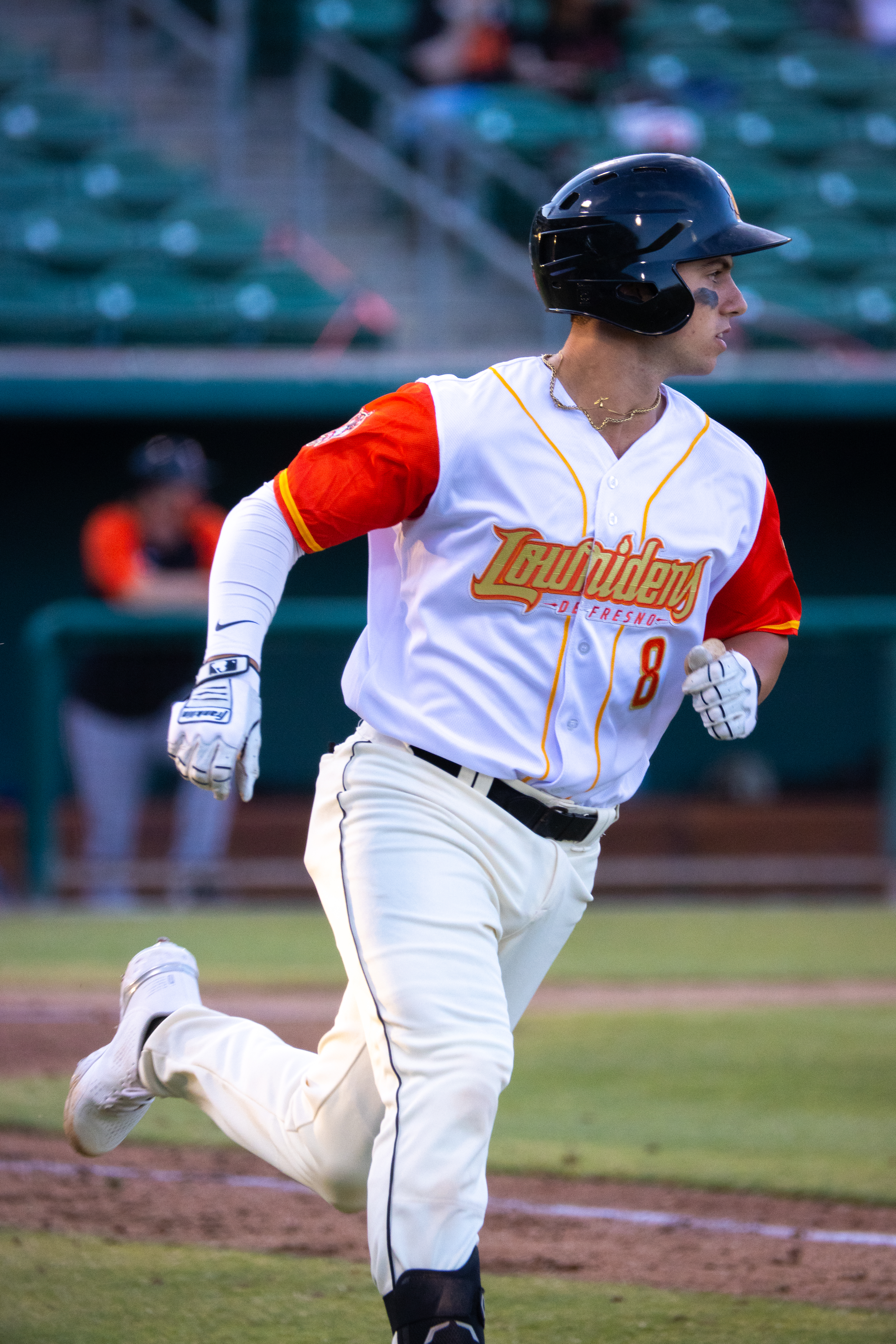
- Romo in 2021 with the Fresno Grizzlies

Chicago White Sox – No. 36
- Catcher
- Born: August 29, 2001 (age 25); Fountain Valley, California, U.S.
- Bats: Switch Throws: Right

MLB debut
- August 17, 2024, for the Colorado Rockies

MLB statistics (through 2026 season)
- Batting average: .150
- Home runs: 7
- Runs batted in: 22
- Stats at Baseball Reference

Teams
- Colorado Rockies (2024–2025); Chicago White Sox (2026–present)
Medals
Men's baseball
Representing United States
U-18 Baseball World Cup
Silver medal – second place	2019 Gijang	Team

Drew Arthur Romo (born August 29, 2001) is an American professional baseball catcher for the Chicago White Sox of Major League Baseball (MLB). He has previously played in MLB for the Colorado Rockies. He was selected 35th overall by the Rockies in the 2020 MLB draft.

== Amateur career ==
Romo attended The Woodlands High School in The Woodlands, Texas, where he played baseball. In 2018, he was selected the United States national under-18 team. As a junior in 2019, he hit .397 with four home runs and 35 RBIs with a .993 fielding percentage. Romo again played for the U.S. national under-18 team as well as participating in the Under Armour All-American Game. He committed to play college baseball at Louisiana State University.

== Professional career ==
=== Colorado Rockies ===
The Colorado Rockies selected Romo with the 35th overall pick in the 2020 Major League Baseball draft. He signed with the Rockies on July 1 for a bonus of $2,095,800. He did not play a minor league game in 2020 due to the cancellation of the minor league season caused by the COVID-19 pandemic.

Romo was assigned to the Fresno Grizzlies of the Low-A West for the 2021 season, slashing .314/.345/.439 with six home runs, 47 RBI, and 23 stolen bases over 79 games. He was assigned to the Spokane Indians of the High-A Northwest League for the 2022 season. Over 101 games, he hit .254 with five home runs, 58 RBI, and 19 stolen bases. To open the 2023 season, Romo was assigned to the Hartford Yard Goats of the Double-A Eastern League. Near the season's end, he was promoted to the Albuquerque Isotopes of the Triple-A Pacific Coast League. Over 95 games, he batted .259 with 13 home runs and 51 RBI. He was selected to play in the Arizona Fall League for the Salt River Rafters after the season.

Romo returned to Albuquerque to open the 2024 season. In 85 games for the Isotopes, he hit .297/.339/.499 with 14 home runs and 60 RBI. On August 16, 2024, Romo was selected to the 40-man roster and promoted to the major leagues for the first time. He recorded his first MLB hit on August 20 against the Washington Nationals. In 16 games during his rookie campaign, Romo slashed .176/.208/.235 with no home runs and six RBI.

Romo was optioned to Triple-A Albuquerque to begin the 2025 season. He played in 60 games for Albuquerque and batted 264 with seven home runs and 23 RBI while missing time due to a broken finger. He made only three appearances for the Rockies, going 0-for-3 with three strikeouts.

=== Chicago White Sox ===
On December 5, 2025, Romo was claimed off waivers by the Baltimore Orioles. He was designated for assignment by Baltimore on December 10, following the acquisition of Josh Walker. On December 17, Romo was claimed off waivers by the New York Mets.

On January 8, 2026, Romo was claimed off waivers by the Chicago White Sox. He was designated for assignment by Chicago on February 1. Romo cleared waivers and was sent outright to the Triple-A Charlotte Knights on February 6. In 17 appearances for Charlotte, he batted .298/.385/.561 with four home runs and 11 RBI. On April 25, the White Sox selected Romo's contract, adding him to their active roster. On April 28, Romo became the first player since Yasmani Grandal in 2012 to homer from both sides of the plate for his first two career home runs during a game against the Los Angeles Angels. Romo played in 61 games for the White Sox and hit .144 with seven home runs and 16 RBI.

== Personal life ==
Romo is a Christian. Romo grew up a fan of the Houston Astros and the New York Yankees.
