= 2026 Colorado Rockies season =

2026 Colorado Rockies
- League: National League
- Division: West
- Ballpark: Coors Field
- City: Denver, Colorado
- Record: 58–104 (.358)
- Divisional place: 5th
- Owners: Charles & Richard Monfort
- President of baseball operations: Paul DePodesta
- General manager: Josh Byrnes
- Manager: Warren Schaeffer
- Television: MLB Local Media
- Radio: KOA (English); KNRV (Spanish)
- Stats: ESPN.com; Baseball Reference

The 2026 Colorado Rockies season was their 34th in Major League Baseball and their 32nd season at Coors Field. The Rockies improved their franchise-worst 43–119 record from last year. However, they still clinched their 8th consecutive losing season on August 27, and were the first team to be eliminated from playoff contention for the second consecutive season on September 6, extending their playoff drought to eight seasons. With their 100th loss on September 22 to the Diamondbacks, they were the first team to lose 100 games in four consecutive seasons since the New York Mets from 1962–65.

Warren Schaefer, the interim manager since May 11, 2025, was named the team's manager on November 24. He was retained by new president of baseball operations Paul DePodesta, who joined the team in early November after leading the Cleveland Browns football team.

On April 10, 2026, it was announced that the Penner Sports Group had bought a 40% minority stake in the Rockies. Led by Denver Broncos co-owners Greg Penner and Carrie Walton Penner, the move made them the largest minority owners in MLB.

On June 14, 2026, the Rockies scored their franchise record 23 runs in a 23–9 win over the Athletics which was played at Las Vegas Ballpark.

== Offseason ==
=== Front office ===
During the offseason, general manager Bill Schmidt, along with assistant general manager Zack Rosenthal resigned from the team. Pitching coach Darryl Scott also departed, in addition to numerous minor league coaches. Interim manager Warren Schaeffer was retained as the full-time manager heading into 2026. Paul DePodesta was hired as president of baseball operations, and Los Angeles Dodgers senior vice president of baseball operations Josh Byrnes was hired as the new general manager. New York Mets executive Ian Levin was announced as assistant general manager. Brett Pill and Alon Leichman were hired as hitting and pitching coaches respectively.

=== Transactions ===
==== November ====
- November 2: RHP Germán Márquez and SS Orlando Arcia elected free agency.
- November 4: 2B Kyle Farmer elected free agency.
- November 5: Claimed OF Troy Johnston off waivers from the Miami Marlins. Activated RHP Jeff Criswell and DH Kris Bryant from the 60-day IL.
- November 6: Claimed RHP Garrett Acton off waivers from the Tampa Bay Rays. Activated 2B Thairo Estrada from the 60-day IL. 2B Thairo Estrada elected free agency.
- November 12: Released RHP Roansy Contreras.
- November 14: Signed free agent LF Drew Avans to a minor league contract.
- November 18: Selected the contract of OF Sterlin Thompson and RHP Gabriel Hughes from AAA Albuquerque. Selected the contract of LHP Welinton Herrera from AA Hartford. Traded minor league CF Braiden Ward to the Boston Red Sox for LHP Brennan Bernardino. Designated LHP Ryan Rolison and 1B Michael Toglia for assignment.
- November 19: Traded LHP Ryan Rolison to the Atlanta Braves for cash considerations.
- November 21: Signed free agent LHP Parker Mushinski to a minor league contract. 1B Michael Toglia elected free agency.
- November 22: Signed free agent SS William Ferrufino to a minor league contract.
- November 25: Signed free agent LHP Adam Laskey to a minor league contract.

==== December ====
- December 1: Signed free agent RHP John Brebbia to a minor league contract.
- December 5: C Drew Romo claimed off waivers by the Baltimore Orioles. RHP Anthony Molina claimed off waivers by the Atlanta Braves. Signed free agent RHP Eiberson Castellano to a minor league contract.
- December 6: Sent 3B Warming Bernabel outright to AAA Albuquerque.
- December 8: Signed free agent 3B Nicky Lopez to a minor league contract.
- December 9: Signed free agent SS Chad Stevens to a minor league contract.
- December 10: Purchased the contract of RHP TJ Shook in the Rule 5 Draft AAA phase. Contract of RHP Luke Taggart purchased by the Detroit Tigers in the Rule 5 Draft AAA phase. Contract of RHP Bryan Mena purchased by the Pittsburgh Pirates in the Rule 5 Draft AAA phase. Contract of RHP Brady Hill purchased by the Washington Nationals in the Rule 5 Draft AAA phase. Purchased the contract of RHP RJ Petit in the Rule 5 Draft.
- December 17: Signed free agent C Brett Sullivan to a minor league contract.
- December 21: Signed free agent SS Vimael Machín to a minor league contract.

==== January 2026 ====
- January 7: Claimed RHP Keegan Thompson off waivers from the Cincinnati Reds.
- January 8: Signed free agent 2B Jack O'Dowd to a minor league contract.
- January 8: Signed free agent RHP Ryan Miller to a minor league contract.
- January 10: Traded RHP Josh Grosz to the Arizona Diamondbacks for CF Jake McCarthy.
- January 15: Signed free agents RHP Angel Adames, SS Maiker Ramirez, RHP Brandol Fernandez, LHP Dilan Lopez, RHP Yeremi Martinez, RHP Alejandro Martinez, OF Gemerson Blanco, RHP Emanuel Mejia, C Douglas Veliz, RHP Rafael Quezada, SS Emil Perez, SS Amaury De Leon, RHP Miguel Vargas, RHP Christopher Green, SS Richard De Los Santos, RHP Anderson Franco, SS Yhoscar Perez, RHP Johander Berrios, RHP Jean Nino, SS Jendry Guaraco, SS Omar Marrugo, RHP Kalhey Chan, RHP Luis Martinez, RHP Juan Villamizar, C José Gudino, RHP Yenderberth Rivas, and RHP Ismael Contreras to minor league contracts. Signed free agent RHP Michael Lorenzen. Designated RHP Bradley Blalock for assignment.
- January 20: Traded RHP Bradley Blalock to the Miami Marlins for RHP Jake Brooks.
- January 22: Signed free agent LF Willi Castro. Designated RHP Garrett Acton for assignment.
- January 28: Traded RHP Jace Kaminska and cash considerations to the Minnesota Twins for 2B Edouard Julien and RHP Pierson Ohl. Traded RHP Angel Chivilli to the New York Yankees for 1B T. J. Rumfield. Designated RF Yanquiel Fernández for assignment. Changed the roster status of 1B T. J. Rumfield.

==== February ====
- February 2: Signed free agents RHP Valente Bellozo and C Kyle McCann to minor league contracts. C Kyle McCann assigned to the Colorado Rockies.
- February 3: RHP Garrett Acton claimed off waivers by the Miami Marlins. Signed free agents SS Cam Hassert, OF Kyle Fossum, and RHP Patrick Weigel to minor league contracts.
- February 4: RF Yanquiel Fernández claimed off waivers by the New York Yankees.
- February 5: Invited non-rosters LHP Sean Sullivan, SS Chad Stevens, OF Charlie Condon, LF Drew Avans, C Cole Messina, LHP Adam Laskey, LHP Konner Eaton, RHP Valente Bellozo, CF Jared Thomas, 3B Nicky Lopez, RHP Brayan Castillo, RHP John Brebbia, LF Conner Capel, 1B Cole Carrigg, SS Vimael Machín, LHP Parker Mushinski, C Brett Sullivan, C Kyle McCann, C Bryant Betancourt, 1B T. J. Rumfield, and RHP Eiberson Castellano to spring training. Changed the roster status of LF Conner Capel and RHP Eiberson Castellano.
- February 7: Signed free agent C Jhonalbert Vargas to a minor league contract.
- February 10: Signed free agent RHP Tomoyuki Sugano. Placed DH Kris Bryant on the 60-day IL.
- February 12: Placed RHP Jeff Criswell on the 60-day IL. Signed free agent LHP José Quintana.
- February 20: Assigned CF Caleb Hobson, RHP Davison Palermo, RF GJ Hill, RHP Ryan Miller, 3B Skyler Messinger, LHP Mason Green, RHP Patrick Weigel, 2B Nic Kent, and LHP Michael Prosecky to the Colorado Rockies. Changed the roster status of RHP Davison Palermo and RHP Ryan Miller.
- February 21: Assigned 1B Zach Kokoska, LHP Griffin Herring, RHP Jake Brooks, LHP Carson Skipper, RHP TJ Shook, and LHP Evan Shawver to the Colorado Rockies. Changed the roster status of RHP Jake Brooks.
- February 22: Assigned RHP Connor Staine, 1B Tommy Hopfe, LHP Sam Weatherly, CF Benny Montgomery, 2B Roc Riggio, INF Kevin Fitzer, C José Córdova, and C Jimmy Obertop to the Colorado Rockies.
- February 23: Assigned RHP Blake Adams to the Colorado Rockies.
- February 25: Assigned RHP Fidel Ulloa to the Colorado Rockies.
- February 26: Assigned 2B Ethan Hedges and RHP Cade Denton to the Colorado Rockies.
- February 27: Assigned LHP Evan Justice to the Colorado Rockies.

==== March ====
- March 1: Assigned RHP Collin Baumgartner to the Colorado Rockies.
- March 2: Assigned LHP Stu Flesland III to the Colorado Rockies.
- March 5: Assigned SS José Torres to the Colorado Rockies.
- March 7: Assigned RHP Victor Juarez to the Colorado Rockies.
- March 8: Optioned LHP Carson Palmquist, OF Sterlin Thompson, RHP Gabriel Hughes, LHP Luis Peralta, and LHP Welinton Herrera to AAA Albuquerque. Assigned 1B Tanner Thach, OF Max Belyeu, and SS Andy Perez to the Colorado Rockies.
- March 9: Assigned OF Robert Calaz and 2B Roldy Brito to the Colorado Rockies. Changed the roster status of OF Robert Calaz.
- March 10: Assigned RHP Austin Smith and LF Aldalay Kolokie to the Colorado Rockies.
- March 11: Assigned SS Dyan Jorge to the Colorado Rockies.
- March 12: Assigned SS Jacob Hinderleider and SS Kelvin Hidalgo to the Colorado Rockies.
- March 14: Assigned SS Wilder Dalis, OF Clayton Gray, RHP Carlos Torres, LHP Justin Loer, CF Jacob Humphrey, C Jesus Freitez, RHP Zach Harris, OF Derek Bernard, and SS Ethan Holliday to the Colorado Rockies.
- March 15: Assigned RHP Fisher Jameson, SS Jeremy Ciriaco, and OF Christian Arguelles to the Colorado Rockies.
- March 17: Optioned RHP Tanner Gordon and 2B Adael Amador to AAA Albuquerque.
- March 18: Assigned RF Alessander De La Cruz to the Colorado Rockies.
- March 20: Assigned 2B Tevin Tucker to the Colorado Rockies.
- March 21: Assigned SS Kamuel Villar to the Colorado Rockies.
- March 22: Optioned C Braxton Fulford to AAA Albuquerque. Released LHP Parker Mushinski. Assigned RHP Nathan Blasick and C Alan Espinal to the Colorado Rockies.
- March 23: Assigned SS Eriel Dihigo, LHP Alberto Pacheco, and RHP Hunter Mann to the Colorado Rockies. Released RHP John Brebbia.
- March 24: Signed free agent LHP Parker Mushinski to a minor league contract.
- March 25: Selected the contracts of 1B T. J. Rumfield and C Brett Sullivan from AAA Albuquerque. Sent RHP Keegan Thompson outright to AAA Albuquerque. Optioned RHP Seth Halvorsen to AAA Albuquerque. Placed RHP RJ Petit and R HP McCade Brown on the 15-day IL. Designated RHP Keegan Thompson for assignment. Placed LF Zac Veen, 1B Blaine Crim, and RF Tyler Freeman on the 10-day IL. Placed RHP Pierson Ohl on the 60-day IL.

== Season standings and schedule ==
=== National League West ===
NL West
Team	W	L	Pct.	GB	Home	Road
Los Angeles Dodgers	100	62	.617	—	51‍–‍30	49‍–‍32
San Diego Padres	91	71	.562	9	51‍–‍30	40‍–‍41
Arizona Diamondbacks	86	76	.531	14	45‍–‍36	41‍–‍40
San Francisco Giants	65	97	.401	35	37‍–‍44	28‍–‍53
Colorado Rockies	58	104	.358	42	32‍–‍49	26‍–‍55

=== National League Wild Card ===
Division leaders
Team	W	L	Pct.
Milwaukee Brewers	103	59	.636
Los Angeles Dodgers	100	62	.617
Atlanta Braves	94	68	.580

Wild Card teams (Top 3 teams qualify for postseason)
Team	W	L	Pct.	GB
San Diego Padres	91	71	.562	+3
Chicago Cubs	89	73	.549	+1
Philadelphia Phillies	88	74	.543	—
Arizona Diamondbacks	86	76	.531	2
Pittsburgh Pirates	82	80	.506	6
Miami Marlins	80	82	.494	8
St. Louis Cardinals	77	85	.475	11
Washington Nationals	77	85	.475	11
Cincinnati Reds	75	87	.463	13
New York Mets	74	88	.457	14
San Francisco Giants	65	97	.401	23
Colorado Rockies	58	104	.358	30

=== Record vs. opponents ===
2026 National League record Source: MLB Standings Grid – 2026
Team	AZ	ATL	CHC	CIN	COL	LAD	MIA	MIL	NYM	PHI	PIT	SD	SF	STL	WSH	AL
Arizona	—	4–3	2–4	4–2	9–4	7–6	1–5	2–4	4–2	3–3	3–3	6–7	10–3	5–2	2–4	24–24
Atlanta	3–4	—	3–3	3–3	6–0	5–1	9–4	3–3	6–7	9–4	5–1	3–4	1–5	2–4	9–4	27–21
Chicago	4–2	3–3	—	9–4	3–3	4–2	3–3	4–9	7–0	6–1	7–6	5–1	3–3	6–7	3–3	22–26
Cincinnati	2–4	3–3	4–9	—	4–2	1–6	3–4	4–9	4–2	3–3	6–7	3–3	3–3	5–8	1–5	29–19
Colorado	4–9	0–6	3–3	2–4	—	3–10	2–5	1–5	4–2	2–4	3–3	2–11	7–6	2–4	3–4	20–28
Los Angeles	6–7	1–5	2–4	6–1	10–3	—	2–4	3–4	5–1	4–2	5–1	8–5	9–4	2–4	6–0	31–17
Miami	5–1	4–9	3–3	4–3	5–2	4–2	—	1–5	6–7	5–8	4–2	0–6	4–2	4–2	9–4	22–26
Milwaukee	4–2	3–3	9–4	9–4	5–1	4–3	5–1	—	4–2	4–2	6–7	2–4	3–4	11–2	2–4	32–16
New York	2–4	7–6	0–7	2–4	2–4	1–5	7–6	2–4	—	6–7	4–2	4–2	5–2	2–4	7–6	23–25
Philadelphia	3–3	4–9	1–6	3–3	4–2	2–4	8–5	2–4	7–6	—	5–2	6–0	4–2	4–2	9–4	26–22
Pittsburgh	3–3	1–5	6–7	7–6	3–3	1–5	2–4	7–6	2–4	2–5	—	3–3	3–3	6–7	4–3	32–16
San Diego	7–6	4–3	1–5	3–3	11–2	5–8	6–0	4–2	2–4	0–6	3–3	—	9–4	3–4	4–2	29–19
San Francisco	3–10	5–1	3–3	3–3	6–7	4–9	2–4	4–3	2–5	2–4	3–3	4–9	—	5–1	3–3	16–32
St. Louis	2–5	4–2	7–6	8–5	4–2	4–2	2–4	2–11	4–2	2–4	7–6	4–3	1–5	—	3–3	23–25
Washington	4–2	4–9	3–3	5–1	4–3	0–6	4–9	4–2	6–7	4–9	3–4	2–4	3–3	3–3	—	28–20

Updated with the results of all games through September 27, 2026.

=== Season summary ===
==== Transactions ====
===== March =====
- March 26: Selected the contract of RHP Valente Bellozo from AAA Albuquerque. Optioned RHP Valente Bellozo to AAA Albuquerque. Transferred RHP RJ Petit from the 15-day IL to the 60-day IL.
- March 27: Recalled C Braxton Fulford from AAA Albuquerque. Placed RF Mickey Moniak on the 10-day IL retroactive to March 24.
- March 31: Sent 1B Blaine Crim and LF Zac Veen on a rehab assignment to AAA Albuquerque.

===== April =====
- April 1: Optioned C Braxton Fulford to AAA Albuquerque. Signed free agent C Andrew Knizner to a minor league contract. Activated RF Tyler Freeman from the 10-day IL.
- April 2: Optioned SS Ryan Ritter to AAA Albuquerque. Recalled RHP Valente Bellozo from AAA Albuquerque. Placed LHP José Quintana on the 15-day IL retroactive to March 30.
- April 3: Activated RF Mickey Moniak from the 10-day IL.
- April 4: Claimed LHP Sammy Peralta off waivers from the Milwaukee Brewers. Optioned LF Zac Veen, LHP Sammy Peralta, and 1B Blaine Crim to AAA Albuquerque. Transferred RHP McCade Brown from the 15-day IL to the 60-day IL. Activated LF Zac Veen and 1B Blaine Crim from the 10-day IL.
- April 13: Optioned RHP Valente Bellozo to AAA Albuquerque.
- April 14: Recalled RHP Tanner Gordon from AAA Albuquerque.
- April 15: Activated LHP José Quintana from the 15-day IL. Placed LHP Kyle Freeland on the 15-day IL retroactive to April 13.
- April 21: Claimed RHP Blas Castaño off waivers from the Seattle Mariners. Optioned RHP Blas Castaño to AAA Albuquerque. Designated LHP Luis Peralta for assignment.
- April 23: Traded 3B Nicky Lopez to the Chicago Cubs for cash considerations. Recalled RHP Seth Halvorsen from AAA Albuquerque. Placed RHP Jimmy Herget on the paternity list.
- April 24: Recalled LHP Sammy Peralta from AAA Albuquerque. Placed RHP Ryan Feltner on the 15-day IL.
- April 26: Recalled RHP Blas Castaño from AAA Albuquerque. Placed RHP Jimmy Herget on the restricted list.
- April 27: Optioned RHP Blas Castaño, LHP Sammy Peralta, and RHP Seth Halvorsen to AAA Albuquerque. LHP Luis Peralta claimed off waivers by the St. Louis Cardinals. Activated RHP Jimmy Herget from the restricted list.
- April 28: Activated LHP Kyle Freeland from the 15-day IL.
- April 29: Sent RHP Jeff Criswell on a rehab assignment to A+ Spokane.
- April 30: Signed free agents 3B Darling Pena and RHP Mario Garcia to minor league contracts.

===== May =====
- May 1: Signed free agent RHP Domingo Acevedo to a minor league contract.
- May 5: Signed free agent LHP Maique Basanta to a minor league contract.
- May 6: Assigned RHP Erasmo Ramírez to the Colorado Rockies. Changed the roster status of RHP Erasmo Ramírez. Signed free agent RHP Jordan Romano to a minor league contract. Sent RHP Jeff Criswell on a rehab assignment to AA Hartford.
- May 9: Recalled RHP Seth Halvorsen from AAA Albuquerque. Placed RHP Jimmy Herget on the bereavement list.
- May 12: Optioned RHP Tanner Gordon to AAA Albuquerque. Activated RHP Jimmy Herget from the bereavement list.
- May 13: Sent RHP Jeff Criswell on a rehab assignment to AAA Albuquerque.
- May 14: Recalled RHP Tanner Gordon from AAA Albuquerque. Placed RHP Jimmy Herget on the 15-day IL retroactive to May 13.
- May 15: Recalled LHP Sammy Peralta and OF Sterlin Thompson from AAA Albuquerque. Signed free agent LHP Grif Hughes to a minor league contract. Placed RF Tyler Freeman on the paternity list. Placed RHP Chase Dollander on the 15-day IL.
- May 16: Signed free agents C Jose Zarraga and RHP Dalvin Marte to minor league contracts.
- May 17: Recalled RHP Blas Castaño from AAA Albuquerque. Optioned RHP Zach Agnos to AAA Albuquerque.
- May 18: Optioned RHP Blas Castaño to AAA Albuquerque. Recalled C Braxton Fulford and RHP Zach Agnos from AAA Albuquerque. Signed free agent OF Mike Antico to a minor league contract. Placed LF Jordan Beck on the 10-day IL.
- May 19: Optioned RF Sterlin Thompson to AAA Albuquerque. Activated RF Tyler Freeman from the paternity list. Sent RHP Ryan Feltner on a rehab assignment to AA Hartford.
- May 20: Selected the contract of RHP Keegan Thompson from AAA Albuquerque. Placed RHP Victor Vodnik on the 15-day IL. Designated 1B Blaine Crim for assignment.
- May 21: Selected the contract of SS Chad Stevens from AAA Albuquerque. Recalled RHP Blas Castaño from AAA Albuquerque. Optioned LHP Sammy Peralta to AAA Albuquerque. Placed CF Brenton Doyle on the 10-day IL. Designated LHP Carson Palmquist for assignment.
- May 22: Recalled RF Sterlin Thompson from AAA Albuquerque. Traded future considerations to the Philadelphia Phillies for RHP Andrew Baker. Placed LF Mickey Moniak on the 10-day IL. Signed free agent RHP Francisco Pérez to a minor league contract.
- May 23: 1B Blaine Crim claimed off waivers by the Texas Rangers.
- May 24: Sent RHP Ryan Feltner on a rehab assignment to AAA Albuquerque.
- May 25: Traded LHP Carson Palmquist to the Washington Nationals for cash considerations. Recalled LHP Welinton Herrera from AAA Albuquerque. Placed LHP José Quintana on the 15-day IL.
- May 28: Activated RHP Jeff Criswell from the 60-day IL. Optioned RHP Jeff Criswell to AAA Albuquerque. Transferred LHP José Quintana to the from the 15-day IL to the 60-day IL.
- May 29: Signed free agent RHP John Brebbia to a minor league contract.
- May 30: Signed free agents RHP Kevin Meza and RHP Maximiliano Quezada to minor league contracts. Placed LHP Welinton Herrera and RHP Ryan Feltner on the 15-day IL.

===== June =====
- June 1: Optioned RHP Zach Agnos to AAA Albuquerque. Selected the contract of RHP TJ Shook from AAA Albuquerque. Transferred LHP Welinton Herrera from the 15-day IL to the 60-day IL.
- June 5: Recalled RHP Zach Agnos from AAA Albuquerque. Placed RHP Tanner Gordon on the 15-day IL retroactive to June 2.
- June 7: Optioned RHP TJ Shook to AAA Albuquerque. Traded cash considerations to the Texas Rangers for SS Richie Martin. Recalled LHP Sammy Peralta from AAA Albuquerque.
- June 9: Selected the contract of OF Cole Carrigg from AAA Albuquerque. Recalled RHP Jeff Criswell from AAA Albuquerque. Sent RHP Victor Vodnik and RHP Jimmy Herget on rehab assignments to AAA Albuquerque. Placed RF Tyler Freeman on the 7-day IL. Designated RHP Keegan Thompson for assignment.
- June 10: Sent RHP Keegan Thompson outright to AAA Albuquerque.
- June 11: Signed free agent 2B Ben Wilmes to a minor league contract.
- June 12: Selected the contract of LHP Sean Sullivan from AAA Albuquerque. Optioned LHP Sammy Peralta to AAA Albuquerque. Transferred RHP Chase Dollander from the 15-day IL to the 60-day IL.
- June 13: Sent RHP Valente Bellozo outright to AAA Albuquerque. Selected the contract of RHP Eiberson Castellano from AAA Albuquerque. Optioned RHP Jeff Criswell to AAA Albuquerque.
- June 14: Optioned 2B Chad Stevens to AAA Albuquerque. Activated RF Tyler Freeman from the 7-day IL.
- June 15: Optioned RHP Eiberson Castellano to AAA Albuquerque. Activated RHP Victor Vodnik from the 15-day IL.
- June 16: Acquired RHP Luke Hansel from the Lake Country DockHounds of the American Association.
- June 17: Optioned RHP Seth Halvorsen to AAA Albuquerque. Activated RHP Jimmy Herget from the 15-day IL.
- June 18: Sent LF Mickey Moniak on a rehab assignment to AAA Albuquerque.
- June 21: Selected the contract of RHP John Brebbia from AAA Albuquerque. Placed RHP Blas Castaño on the 15-day IL retroactive to June 18. Designated LHP Sammy Peralta for assignment.
- June 22: Optioned RF Sterlin Thompson to AAA Albuquerque. Actived LF Mickey Moniak from the 10-day IL.
- June 23: Acquired IF Parker Coddou from the Tri-City ValleyCats of the Frontier League. Sent CF Brenton Doyle and LF Jordan Beck on rehab assignments to AAA Albuquerque.
- June 24: Recalled RHP Seth Halvorsen from AAA Albuquerque. Acquired 1B Aidan Redahan from the Great Falls Voyagers of the Pioneer League. Placed RHP Jaden Hill on the 15-day IL retroactive to June 21. Sent RHP Tanner Gordon on a rehab assignment to AAA Albuquerque.
- June 25: Sent LHP Sammy Peralta outright to AAA Albuquerque.
- June 28: Activated LF Jordan Beck from the 10-day IL. Optioned LF Jordan Beck to AAA Albuquerque.
- June 30: Optioned LHP Sean Sullivan to AAA Albuquerque. Activated RHP Tanner Gordon from the 15-day IL.

===== July =====
- July 1: Recalled RHP Gabriel Hughes from AAA Albuquerque. Designated RHP John Brebbia for assignment.
- July 3: Sent RHP John Brebbia outright to AAA Albuquerque.
- July 4: Recallled LHP Sean Sullivan from AAA Albuquerque. Selected the contract of RHP Jordan Romano from AAA Albuquerque. Placed RHP Seth Halvorsen and RHP Tomoyuki Sugano on the 15-day IL retroactive to July 1.
- July 5: Optioned LHP Sean Sullivan to AAA Albuquerque. Recalled RHP TJ Shook from AAA Albuquerque.
- July 9: Signed free agent RHP John Brebbia to a minor league contract.
- July 11: Recalled RHP Jeff Criswell from AAA Albuquerque. Optioned RHP TJ Shook to AAA Albuquerque.
- July 16: Signed free agent OF Carlos Brito to a minor league contract.
- July 18: Placed RHP Jeff Criswell on the 15-day IL. Activated RHP Tomoyuki Sugano from the 15-day IL.
- July 19: Sent RHP Seth Halvorsen on a rehab assignment to AAA Albuquerque. Signed free agents 3B Aidan Meola and C Talmadge LeCroy to minor league contracts.
- July 20: Traded RHP Seth Halvorsen to the Los Angeles Dodgers for RHP Nick Frasso and OF Landyn Vidourek. Optioned RHP Nick Frasso to AAA Albuquerque.
- July 23: Sent CF Brenton Doyle on a rehab assignment to AAA Albuquerque.
- July 31: Optioned DH Braxton Fulford to AAA Albuquerque. Activated CF Brenton Doyle from the 10-day IL.

===== August =====
- August 1: Sent RHP Blas Castaño on a rehab assignment to AAA Albuquerque.
- August 3: Traded CF Brenton Doyle to the Chicago White Sox for RHP Mason Adams and SS Carlos Vielma. Traded RHP Antonio Senzatela to the Milwaukee Brewers for LHP Mark Manfredi and SS Juan Martinez. Traded RHP Victor Vodnik to the Miami Marlins for 1B Connor Norby and RHP Aiden May. Recalled RHP Nick Frasso and LF Jordan Beck from AAA Albuquerque. Placed LHP Sean Sullivan on the 15-day IL retroactive to July 5.
- August 4: Selected the contract of LHP Parker Mushinski from AAA Albuquerque.
- August 8: Activated RHP Blas Castaño from the 15-day IL. Optioned RHP Blas Castaño to AAA Albuquerque.
- August 10: Recalled 1B Connor Norby from AAA Albuquerque. Placed RF Tyler Freeman on the 10-day IL retroactive to August 9.
- August 11: Recalled LF Zac Veen from AAA Albuquerque. Designated 2B Edouard Julien for assignment. Sent RHP Jeff Criswell on a rehab assignment to AAA Albuquerque.
- August 12: Recalled 2B Adael Amador from AAA Albuquerque. Optioned RHP Jeff Criswell to AAA Albuquerque. Placed 3B Kyle Karros on the 7-day IL.
- August 13: Sent 2B Edouard Julien outright to AAA Albuquerque.
- August 14: Sent RHP Jaden Hill on a rehab assignment to AAA Albuquerque.
- August 17: Recalled RHP TJ Shook from AAA Albuquerque. Designated RHP Michael Lorenzen for assignment.
- August 18: Recalled DH Braxton Fulford from AAA Albuquerque. Placed C Hunter Goodman on the 10-day IL retroactive to August 15.
- August 19: Optioned RHP TJ Shook to AAA Albuquerque. Selected the contract of LHP Mark Manfredi from AAA Albuquerque. Activated RHP Jaden Hill from the 15-day IL. Designated LHP Parker Mushinski for assignment. Released RHP Michael Lorenzen.
- August 20: Sent RF Tyler Freeman on a rehab assignment to AAA Albuquerque.
- August 21: Optioned 2B Adael Amador to AAA Albuquerque. Actived 3B Kyle Karros from the 7-day IL.
- August 22: Sent LHP Parker Mushinski outright to AAA Albuquerque.
- August 23: Activated RF Tyler Freeman from the 10-day IL. Optioned RF Tyler Freeman to AAA Albuquerque. Recalled SS Ryan Ritter from AAA Albuquerque. Placed 3B Kyle Karros on the 7-day IL.
- August 24: Selected the contract of RHP Blake Adams from AAA Albuquerque. Placed LHP Kyle Freeland on the 15-day IL retroactive to August 21.
- August 25: Optioned DH Braxton Fulford to AAA Albuquerque. Selected the contract of RHP Mason Adams from AAA Albuquerque. Optioned RHP Blake Adams to AAA Albuquerque. Activated C Hunter Goodman from the 10-day IL.

===== September =====
- September 1: Recalled RHP Blas Castaño and 2B Adael Amador from AAA Albuquerque.
- September 3: Sent 3B Kyle Karros on a rehab assignment to AA Hartford.
- September 4: Claimed LHP Hayden Harris off waivers from the Atlanta Braves. Optioned LHP Hayden Harris to AAA Albuquerque.
- September 5: Sent RF Tyler Freeman outright to AAA Albuquerque. Selected the contract of SS Vimael Machín from AAA Albuquerque. Placed 2B Willi Castro on the 10-day IL retroactive to September 2.
- September 7: Optioned SS Ryan Ritter to AAA Albuquerque. Activated 3B Kyle Karros from the 7-day IL.
- September 9: Sent LHP Kyle Freeland and LHP José Quintana on a rehab assignment to AA Hartford.
- September 10: Sent LHP Sean Sullivan on a rehab assignment to AAA Albuquerque.
- September 13: Sent LHP José Quintana on a rehab assignment to AAA Albuquerque.
- September 15: Recalled DH Braxton Fulford from AAA Albuquerque. Optioned SS Vimael Machín and RHP Blas Castaño to AAA Albuquerque. Activated LHP Kyle Freeland from the 15-day IL.
- September 16: Optioned LHP Sean Sullivan to AAA Albuquerque.
- September 19: Optioned RHP Gabriel Hughes to AAA Albuquerque. Designated SS Vimael Machín for assignment. Activated LHP José Quintana from the 60-day IL.
- September 22: Sent SS Vimael Machín outright to the ACL Rockies.

=== Game log ===
Legend
	Rockies win
	Rockies loss
	Postponement
	Eliminated from playoff race
**Bold**	Rockies team member

2026 Game Log: 58–104 (Home: 32–49; Road: 26–55)
March/April: 14–18 (Home: 7–6; Road: 7–12)

#	Date	Opponent	Score	Win	Loss	Save	Attendance	Record	Streak
1	March 27	@ Marlins	1–2	Alcántara (1–0)	**Freeland** (0–1)	Fairbanks (1)	32,459	0–1	L1
2	March 28	@ Marlins	3–4	Faucher (1–0)	**Hill** (0–1)	Fairbanks (2)	10,160	0–2	L2
3	March 29	@ Marlins	3–4	Petersen (1–0)	**Vodnik** (0–1)	—	17,355	0–3	L3
4	March 30	@ Blue Jays	14–5	**Dollander** (1–0)	Varland (0–1)	—	35,490	1–3	W1
5	March 31	@ Blue Jays	1–5	Scherzer (1–0)	**Mejía** (0–1)	—	38,871	1–4	L1
6	April 1	@ Blue Jays	2–1 (10)	**Bernardino** (1–0)	Little (0–1)	**Herget** (1)	37,208	2–4	W1
7	April 3	Phillies	1–10	Nola (1–0)	**Lorenzen** (0–1)	—	48,366	2–5	L1
8	April 4	Phillies	1–2	Luzardo (1–1)	**Dollander** (1–1)	Durán (3)	39,718	2–6	L2
9	April 5	Phillies	4–1	**Sugano** (1–0)	Walker (0–2)	**Vodnik** (1)	29,757	3–6	W1
10	April 6	Astros	9–7	**Feltner** (1–0)	Weiss (0–1)	**Mejía** (1)	16,301	4–6	W2
11	April 7	Astros	5–1	**Freeland** (1–1)	Burrows (1–2)	**Senzatela** (1)	17,328	5–6	W3
12	April 8	Astros	9–1	**Lorenzen** (1–1)	Blubaugh (1–2)	**Agnos** (1)	15,189	6–6	W4
13	April 9	@ Padres	3–7 (12)	Morgan (1–0)	**Bellozo** (0–1)	—	41,390	6–7	L1
14	April 10	@ Padres	2–5	Miller (1–0)	**Mejía** (0–2)	—	42,454	6–8	L2
15	April 11	@ Padres	5–9	Márquez (2–1)	**Feltner** (1–1)	Adam (1)	42,318	6–9	L3
16	April 12	@ Padres	2–7	Morgan (2–0)	**Herget** (0–1)	—	39,786	6–10	L4
17	April 14	@ Astros	6–7	Blubaugh (2–2)	**Lorenzen** (1–2)	De Los Santos (1)	29,536	6–11	L5
18	April 15	@ Astros	1–3	Arrighetti (1–0)	**Quintana** (0–1)	De Los Santos (2)	28,298	6–12	L6
19	April 16	@ Astros	3–2	**Dollander** (2–1)	Roa (0–1)	**Vodnik** (2)	27,842	7–12	W1
20	April 17	Dodgers	1–7	Glasnow (2–0)	**Sugano** (1–1)	—	28,783	7–13	L1
21	April 18	Dodgers	4–3	**Bernardino** (2–0)	Klein (1–1)	**Vodnik** (3)	47,925	8–13	W1
22	April 19	Dodgers	9–6	**Senzatela** (1–0)	Treinen (1–1)	—	42,677	9–13	W2
23	April 20	Dodgers	3–12	Wrobleski (3–0)	**Quintana** (0–2)	—	27,261	9–14	L1
24	April 21	Padres	0–1	Vásquez (2–0)	**Dollander** (2–2)	Morejón (1)	15,672	9–15	L2
25	April 22	Padres	8–3	**Sugano** (2–1)	Buehler (1–2)	—	18,114	10–15	W1
26	April 23	Padres	8–10	Marinaccio (1–0)	**Vodnik** (0–2)	Miller (9)	25,973	10–16	L1
27	April 24	@ Mets	4–3	**Lorenzen** (2–2)	Peralta (1–3)	**Senzatela** (2)	36,233	11–16	W1
―	April 25	@ Mets	**Postponed (rain)** (Makeup date: April 26)						
28	April 26 (1)	@ Mets	3–1	**Quintana** (1–2)	McLean (1–2)	**Vodnik** (4)	see 2nd game	12–16	W2
29	April 26 (2)	@ Mets	3–0	**Dollander** (3–2)	Senga (0–4)	**Agnos** (2)	38,155	13–16	W3
30	April 28	@ Reds	2–7	Burns (3–1)	**Freeland** (1–2)	—	24,152	13–17	L1
31	April 29	@ Reds	13–2	**Sugano** (3–1)	Williamson (2–3)	—	17,823	14–17	W1
32	April 30	@ Reds	4–6	Abbott (1–2)	**Lorenzen** (2–3)	—	17,211	14–18	L1

May: 8–20 (Home: 5–10; Road: 3–10)

#	Date	Opponent	Score	Win	Loss	Save	Attendance	Record	Streak
33	May 1	Braves	6–8	Fuentes (1–0)	**Mejía** (0–3)	Suárez (4)	23,548	14–19	L2
34	May 2	Braves	1–9	Sale (6–1)	**Bernardino** (2–1)	—	38,569	14–20	L3
35	May 3	Braves	6–11	Bummer (1–1)	**Freeland** (1–3)	—	32,994	14–21	L4
36	May 4	Mets	2–4	Peterson (1–4)	**Sugano** (3–2)	Williams (4)	15,564	14–22	L5
―	May 5	Mets	**Postponed (snow)** (Makeup date: May 7)						
37	May 6	Mets	5–10	Peralta (2–3)	**Lorenzen** (2–4)	Williams (5)	11,155	14–23	L6
38	May 7	Mets	6–2	**Senzatela** (2–0)	Kimbrel (0–2)	—	13,378	15–23	W1
39	May 8	@ Phillies	9–7 (11)	**Vodnik** (1–2)	Keller (1–1)	**Mejía** (2)	39,478	16–23	W2
40	May 9	@ Phillies	3–9	Mayza (1–1)	**Freeland** (1–4)	—	38,043	16–24	L1
41	May 10	@ Phillies	0–6	Sánchez (4–2)	**Sugano** (3–3)	—	44,620	16–25	L2
42	May 12	@ Pirates	1–3	Skenes (6–2)	**Lorenzen** (2–5)	Soto (4)	13,516	16–26	L3
43	May 13	@ Pirates	10–4	**Senzatela** (3–0)	Keller (4–2)	—	10,554	17–26	W1
44	May 14	@ Pirates	2–7	Mlodzinski (3–3)	**Dollander** (3–3)	—	19,101	17–27	L1
45	May 15	Diamondbacks	1–9	Kelly (3–3)	**Freeland** (1–5)	—	27,557	17–28	L2
46	May 16	Diamondbacks	4–2	**Sugano** (4–3)	Rodríguez (4–1)	**Senzatela** (3)	34,405	18–28	W1
47	May 17	Diamondbacks	6–8	Soroka (6–2)	**Lorenzen** (2–6)	Sewald (10)	24,955	18–29	L1
48	May 18	Rangers	7–6	**Quintana** (2–2)	Gore (3–4)	**Mejía** (3)	16,126	19–29	W1
49	May 19	Rangers	0–10	Rocker (2–4)	**Peralta** (0–1)	—	15,916	19–30	L1
50	May 20	Rangers	4–5	Latz (1–1)	**Bernardino** (2–2)	—	18,726	19–31	L2
51	May 21	@ Diamondbacks	1–2	Sewald (1–4)	**Mejía** (0–4)	—	14,761	19–32	L3
52	May 22	@ Diamondbacks	3–2	**Senzatela** (4–0)	Thompson (2–1)	—	29,945	20–32	W1
53	May 23	@ Diamondbacks	4–5	Gallen (3–4)	**Lorenzen** (2–7)	Sewald (12)	33,891	20–33	L1
54	May 24	@ Diamondbacks	1–9	Nelson (2–3)	**Quintana** (2–3)	—	30,037	20–34	L2
55	May 25	@ Dodgers	3–5	Hurt (1–0)	**Bernardino** (2–3)	Treinen (1)	48,778	20–35	L3
56	May 26	@ Dodgers	6–15	Lauer (2–5)	**Freeland** (1–6)	—	52,148	20–36	L4
57	May 27	@ Dodgers	1–4	Ohtani (5–2)	**Sugano** (4–4)	Hurt (1)	50,832	20–37	L5
58	May 29	Giants	8–6	**Mejía** (1–4)	Kilian (1–3)	—	28,568	21–37	W1
59	May 30	Giants	8–3	**Feltner** (2–1)	Houser (2–5)	—	31,085	22–37	W2
60	May 31	Giants	6–19	Kilian (2–3)	**Gordon** (0–1)	—	37,965	22–38	L1

June: 11–15 (Home: 6–8; Road: 5–7)

#	Date	Opponent	Score	Win	Loss	Save	Attendance	Record	Streak
61	June 1	@ Angels	9–8	**Senzatela** (5–0)	Yates (0–1)	—	27,165	23–38	W1
62	June 2	@ Angels	8–2	**Sugano** (5–4)	Rodriguez (2–2)	—	26,426	24–38	W2
63	June 3	@ Angels	4–11	Ureña (3–4)	**Lorenzen** (2–8)	—	26,554	24–39	L1
64	June 5	Brewers	7–9 (10)	Megill (1–2)	**Mejía** (1–5)	—	31,349	24–40	L2
65	June 6	Brewers	1–7	Misiorowski (7–2)	**Agnos** (0–1)	—	30,320	24–41	L3
66	June 7	Brewers	4–12	Drohan (3–1)	**Hill** (0–2)	—	32,270	24–42	L4
67	June 9	Cubs	7–3	**Sugano** (6–4)	Rea (5–4)	—	29,302	25–42	W1
68	June 10	Cubs	3–2	**Senzatela** (6–0)	Palencia (1–1)	—	31,802	26–42	W2
69	June 11	Cubs	3–9	Cabrera (4–3)	**Feltner** (2–2)	—	35,128	26–43	L1
70	June 12	@ Athletics	4–6	Barnett (1–0)	**Agnos** (0–2)	Harris (6)	8,534	26–44	L2
71	June 13	@ Athletics	5–7	Suárez (1–2)	**Freeland** (1–7)	Alvarado (2)	8,532	26–45	L3
72	June 14	@ Athletics	23–9	**Sugano** (7–4)	Springs (3–7)	**Castellano** (1)	8,268	27–45	W1
73	June 15	@ Cubs	4–5	Palencia (2–1)	**Mejía** (1–6)	—	38,337	27–46	L1
74	June 16	@ Cubs	5–2	**Castaño** (1–0)	Cabrera (4–4)	**Hill** (1)	35,183	28–46	W1
75	June 17	@ Cubs	6–8	Assad (5–1)	**Sullivan** (0–1)	Webb (2)	34,938	28–47	L1
76	June 19	Pirates	4–3	**Senzatela** (7–0)	Montgomery (2–2)	—	33,596	29–47	W1
77	June 20	Pirates	2–1	**Sugano** (8–4)	Skenes (6–7)	**Hill** (2)	40,380	30–47	W2
78	June 21	Pirates	6–8	Ramírez (5–2)	**Lorenzen** (2–9)	—	38,912	30–48	L1
79	June 22	Red Sox	3–2	**Vodnik** (2–2)	Chapman (0–3)	—	26,910	31–48	W1
80	June 23	Red Sox	2–5	Gray (9–1)	**Sullivan** (0–2)	—	29,961	31–49	L1
81	June 24	Red Sox	8–6	**Senzatela** (8–0)	Slaten (0–4)	**Herget** (2)	27,379	32–49	W1
82	June 26	@ Twins	8–9 (10)	Morris (3–2)	**Herget** (0–2)	—	27,317	32–50	L1
83	June 27	@ Twins	8–5	**Lorenzen** (3–9)	Paredes (0–1)	**Herget** (3)	25,115	33–50	W1
84	June 28	@ Twins	2–3	Morris (4–2)	**Halvorsen** (0–1)	Gómez (8)	20,277	33–51	L1
85	June 29	Marlins	7–10	Alcántara (9–4)	**Vodnik** (2–3)	—	22,910	33–52	L2
86	June 30	Marlins	3–14	Pérez (4–6)	**Gordon** (0–2)	—	20,526	33–53	L3

July: 10–14 (Home: 7–5; Road: 3–9)

#	Date	Opponent	Score	Win	Loss	Save	Attendance	Record	Streak
87	July 1	Marlins	6–3	**Freeland** (2–7)	Meyer (9–1)	**Bernardino** (1)	18,798	34–53	W1
88	July 2	Marlins	14–4	**Bernardino** (3–3)	King (6–2)	—	19,595	35–53	W2
89	July 3	Giants	15–3	**Feltner** (3–2)	Webb (5–6)	**Hughes** (1)	47,655	36–53	W3
90	July 4	Giants	4–6	Ray (8–6)	**Sullivan** (0–3)	Kilian (8)	48,635	36–54	L1
91	July 5	Giants	7–6	**Vodnik** (3–3)	Smith (0–1)	**Romano** (5)	25,548	37–54	W1
92	July 6	@ Dodgers	7–8 (11)	Henriquez (3–0)	**Herget** (0–3)	—	48,245	37–55	L1
93	July 7	@ Dodgers	4–3	**Mejía** (2–6)	Klein (3–3)	**Romano** (6)	47,806	38–55	W1
94	July 8	@ Dodgers	3–4	Henriquez (4–0)	**Senzatela** (8–1)	Scott (13)	49,996	38–56	L1
95	July 9	@ Giants	2–8	Whisenhunt (2–0)	**Feltner** (3–3)	—	32,301	38–57	L2
96	July 10	@ Giants	4–3	**Senzatela** (9–1)	Kilian (2–5)	**Mejía** (4)	34,144	39–57	W1
97	July 11	@ Giants	2–4	Mahle (2–8)	**Freeland** (2–8)	Brubaker (1)	35,190	39–58	L1
98	July 12	@ Giants	1–3	Miller (2–0)	**Senzatela** (9–2)	—	33,354	39–59	L2
–	July 14	**96th All-Star Game in Philadelphia, PA**							
99	July 17	Reds	2–7	Singer (4–9)	**Hughes** (0–1)	—	40,356	39–60	L3
100	July 18	Reds	10–3	**Sugano** (9–4)	Lowder (3–7)	—	31,585	40–60	W1
101	July 19	Reds	6–9	Greene (2–1)	**Feltner** (3–4)	—	20,158	40–61	L1
102	July 20	Nationals	3–7	Cornelio (1–1)	**Freeland** (2–9)	Cosgrove (1)	20,050	40–62	L2
103	July 21	Nationals	8–7	**Mejía** (3–6)	Beeter (3–3)	**Romano** (7)	24,273	41–62	W1
104	July 22	Nationals	0–8	Cavalli (7–4)	**Hughes** (0–2)	—	23,196	41–63	L1
105	July 24	@ Brewers	5–2	**Sugano** (10–4)	Drohan (5–4)	**Romano** (8)	37,089	42–63	W1
106	July 25	@ Brewers	5–8	Gasser (3–4)	**Feltner** (3–5)	Megill (17)	34,328	42–64	L1
107	July 26	@ Brewers	2–11	Misiorowski (11–4)	**Freeland** (2–10)	—	39,131	42–65	L2
108	July 28	@ Padres	7–8	Miller (3–1)	**Herget** (0–4)	—	42,433	42–66	L3
109	July 29	@ Padres	1–3	Canning (2–9)	**Hughes** (0–3)	Miller (28)	40,714	42–67	L4
110	July 31	Royals	3–1	**Sugano** (11–4)	Wacha (5–8)	**Romano** (9)	39,317	43–67	W1

August: 9–19 (Home: 2–10; Road: 7–9)

#	Date	Opponent	Score	Win	Loss	Save	Attendance	Record	Streak
111	August 1	Royals	12–6	**Feltner** (4–5)	Avila (5–4)	—	40,216	44–67	W2
112	August 2	Royals	8–1	**Freeland** (3–10)	Lugo (4–7)	—	32,226	45–67	W3
113	August 3	Rays	9–13	Seymour (8–3)	**Lorenzen** (3–10)	—	19,598	45–68	L1
114	August 4	Rays	7–9 (11)	Cleavinger (4–3)	**Frasso** (0–1)	Baker (32)	23,071	45–69	L2
115	August 5	Rays	0–4	Martinez (11–3)	**Sugano** (11–5)	—	21,100	45–70	L3
116	August 7	@ Cardinals	2–3	Leahy (8–4)	**Feltner** (4–6)	O'Brien (28)	26,481	45–71	L4
117	August 8	@ Cardinals	8–6	**Mushinski** (1–0)	Liberatore (5–9)	**Romano** (10)	29,204	46–71	W1
118	August 9	@ Cardinals	4–7	Soriano (5–3)	**Gordon** (0–3)	O'Brien (29)	25,589	46–72	L1
119	August 10	@ Diamondbacks	0–9	Littell (8–8)	**Hughes** (0–4)	—	17,358	46–73	L2
120	August 11	@ Diamondbacks	3–2	**Sugano** (12–5)	Ginkel (5–4)	**Romano** (11)	21,002	47–73	W1
121	August 12	@ Diamondbacks	6–4	**Feltner** (5–6)	Kelly (8–10)	**Romano** (12)	17,168	48–73	W2
122	August 14	@ Giants	5–2	**Freeland** (4–10)	Roupp (7–12)	—	38,258	49–73	W3
123	August 15	@ Giants	1–7	Webb (8–7)	Lorenzen (3–11)	—	35,069	49–74	L1
124	August 16	@ Giants	13–7	**Frasso** (1–1)	Hentges (1–5)	—	32,063	50–74	W1
125	August 17	Dodgers	5–11	Snell (1–1)	**Sugano** (12–6)	—	34,609	50–75	L1
126	August 18	Dodgers	6–7	Lauer (8–6)	**Feltner** (5–7)	Scott (17)	29,898	50–76	L2
127	August 19	Dodgers	4–6 (10)	Hurt (4–1)	**Herget** (0–5)	Scott (18)	33,179	50–77	L3
128	August 21	Guardians	1–9	Herrin (2–4)	**Gordon** (0–4)	—	26,800	50–78	L4
129	August 22	Guardians	3–4	Bibee (5–13)	**Hughes** (0–5)	Smith (33)	39,327	50–79	L5
130	August 23	Guardians	2–7	Griffin (15–4)	**Sugano** (12–7)	—	28,835	50–80	L6
131	August 24	@ Nationals	3–13	Cavalli (12–5)	**Feltner** (5–8)	—	12,105	50–81	L7
132	August 25	@ Nationals	3–1	**Manfredi** (1–0)	Alvarez (2–6)	**Romano** (13)	13,876	51–81	W1
133	August 26	@ Nationals	13–1	**Gordon** (1–4)	Dion (1–1)	—	13,845	52–81	W2
134	August 27	@ Nationals	1–7	Cosgrove (1–2)	**Hughes** (0–6)	—	14,768	52–82	L1
135	August 28	@ Braves	4–6	Holmes (9–5)	**Sugano** (12–8)	Iglesias (29)	38,006	52–83	L2
136	August 29	@ Braves	1–2	Suter (2–2)	**Hill** (0–3)	Fuentes (3)	40,129	52–84	L3
137	August 30	@ Braves	2–3 (10)	Mederos (4–1)	**Feltner** (5–9)	—	31,776	52–85	L4
138	August 31	Orioles	1–2	Wolfram (6–2)	**Manfredi** (1–1)	Kittredge (9)	17,277	52–86	L5

September: 6–18 (Home: 5–10; Road: 1–8)

#	Date	Opponent	Score	Win	Loss	Save	Attendance	Record	Streak
139	September 1	Orioles	4–2	**Hill** (1–3)	De León (0–1)	**Romano** (14)	16,334	53–86	W1
140	September 2	Orioles	6–5 (11)	**Castaño** (2–0)	Wolfram (6–3)	—	15,616	54–86	W2
141	September 4	Cardinals	6–7	Winquest (1–0)	**Romano** (0–3)	O'Brien (36)	28,580	54–87	L1
142	September 5	Cardinals	10–7	**Bernardino** (4–3)	Liberatore (5–14)	**Romano** (15)	39,768	55–87	W1
143	September 6	Cardinals	L 8–10	Hjerpe (1–0)	**Herget** (0–6)	Soriano (3)	30,819	55–88	L1
144	September 8	@ Yankees	3–5	Schlittler (13–6)	**Hughes** (0–7)	Bednar (32)	46,211	55–89	L2
145	September 9	@ Yankees	1–6	Warren (10–6)	**Sugano** (12–9)	—	34,413	55–90	L3
146	September 10	@ Yankees	3–10	Schreiber (2–3)	**Feltner** (5–10)	—	40,706	55–91	L4
147	September 11	@ Tigers	2–6	Valdez (10–10)	**Manfredi** (1–2)	Jansen (19)	33,245	55–92	L5
148	September 12	@ Tigers	7–11	Brieske (1–0)	**Hill** (1–4)	—	32,019	55–93	L6
149	September 13	@ Tigers	1–8	Jobe (2–2)	**Hughes** (0–8)	—	22,726	55–94	L7
150	September 14	Padres	7–8	Mize (6–9)	**Sugano** (12–10)	Miller (37)	14,805	55–95	L8
151	September 15	Padres	9–3	**Feltner** (6–10)	Peralta (3–3)	—	15,115	56–95	W1
152	September 16	Padres	3–9	Ray (13–8)	**Adams** (0–1)	—	16,806	56–96	L1
153	September 17	Padres	2–9	King (12–9)	**Gordon** (1–5)	—	16,674	56–97	L2
154	September 18	Mariners	4–5	Vargas (2–0)	**Romano** (0–4)	Muñoz (28)	40,203	56–98	L3
155	September 19	Mariners	5–3	**Mejía** (4–6)	Ferrer (4–4)	**Bernardino** (4–4)	34,457	57–98	W1
156	September 20	Mariners	1–2	Anderson (2–2)	**Sugano** (12–11)	Bazardo (1)	33,751	57–99	L1
157	September 22	Diamondbacks	2–7	Soroka (9–5)	**Freeland** (4–11)	—	19,324	57–100	L2
158	September 23	Diamondbacks	3–5	Kelly (10–14)	**Adams** (0–2)	Loáisiga (2)	21,041	57–101	L3
159	September 24	Diamondbacks	8–12	Rodríguez (15–7)	**Gordon** (1–6)	—	22,511	57–102	L4
160	September 25	@ White Sox	1–6	Burke (11–7)	**Sugano** (12–12)	—	35,778	57–103	L5
161	September 26	@ White Sox	9–6	**Feltner** (7–10)	Martin (9–8)	—	31,938	58–103	W1
162	September 27	@ White Sox	2–4	Kay (10–9)	**Freeland** (4–12)	Richards (2)	29,767	58–104	L1

== Roster ==
2026 Colorado Rockies
Roster
Pitchers: 57 Blake Adams; 38 Mason Adams; 36 Zach Agnos; 56 Valente Bellozo; 83 Brennan Bernardino; 60 John Brebbia; 63 Blas Castaño; 55 Eiberson Castellano; 46 Jeff Criswell; 32 Chase Dollander; 18 Ryan Feltner; 41 Nick Frasso; 21 Kyle Freeland; 29 Tanner Gordon; 54 Seth Halvorsen; 44 Jimmy Herget; 59 Welinton Herrera; 0 Jaden Hill; 43 Gabriel Hughes; 24 Michael Lorenzen; 54 Mark Manfredi; 47 Juan Mejía; 67 Parker Mushinski; 57 Sammy Peralta; 62 José Quintana; 68 Jordan Romano; 49 Antonio Senzatela; 52 TJ Shook; 11 Tomoyuki Sugano; 45 Sean Sullivan; 34 Keegan Thompson; 38 Victor Vodnik	Catchers: 37 Braxton Fulford; 15 Hunter Goodman; 26 Brett Sullivan; Infielders: 1 Adael Amador; 3 Willi Castro; 6 Edouard Julien; 12 Kyle Karros; 25 Vimael Machín; 35 Connor Norby; 8 Ryan Ritter; 7 TJ Rumfield; 39 Chad Stevens; 14 Ezequiel Tovar	Outfielders: 27 Jordan Beck; 16 Cole Carrigg; 9 Brenton Doyle; 2 Tyler Freeman; 20 Troy Johnston; 31 Jake McCarthy; 22 Mickey Moniak; 30 Sterlin Thompson; 13 Zac Veen	4 Warren Schaeffer; Coaches: 50 Doug Bernier (first base/outfield); 73 Matt Buschmann (bullpen); 75 Kyle Cunningham (asst. bullpen catcher); 53 Ronnie Gideon (asst. bench); 70 Andy González (third base); 77 Alon Leichman (pitching); 74 Jordan Pacheco (asst. hitting); 61 Jeff Pickler (bench); 72 Brett Pill (hitting); 76 Chris Rabago (bullpen catcher); 79 Gabe Ribas (asst. pitching)

== Player stats ==
= Indicates team leader

=== Batting ===
Note: G = Games played; AB = At bats; R = Runs scored; H = Hits; 2B = Doubles; 3B = Triples; HR = Home runs; RBI = Runs batted in; SB = Stolen bases; BB = Walks; AVG = Batting average; SLG = Slugging average

Player	G	AB	R	H	2B	3B	HR	RBI	SB	BB	AVG	SLG
TJ Rumfield	155	547	67	164	30	3	16	73	0	72	.300	.453
Jake McCarthy	147	547	80	159	30	13	15	83	32	30	.291	.475
Hunter Goodman	138	518	84	127	20	2	41	88	5	46	.245	.529
Ezequiel Tovar	146	465	57	102	23	0	13	44	8	29	.219	.353
Willi Castro	120	427	65	111	20	1	15	56	10	41	.260	.417
Kyle Karros	131	411	63	104	21	3	13	49	5	54	.253	.414
Mickey Moniak	117	404	49	96	17	6	23	65	1	22	.238	.480
Troy Johnston	128	397	41	110	32	1	4	50	4	37	.277	.393
Cole Carrigg	93	333	50	93	22	4	12	53	11	28	.279	.477
Tyler Freeman	79	255	29	63	6	1	3	23	6	11	.247	.314
Edouard Julien	88	236	37	49	9	1	3	20	5	39	.208	.292
Brett Sullivan	82	218	23	49	13	1	7	33	1	13	.225	.390
Jordan Beck	63	165	17	33	8	2	1	11	2	14	.200	.291
Connor Norby	40	129	19	39	11	0	3	18	4	16	.302	.457
Brenton Doyle	45	117	22	25	5	0	1	5	9	12	.214	.282
Adael Amador	27	83	17	23	5	0	4	16	0	10	.277	.482
Braxton Fulford	47	74	12	13	4	0	1	7	4	8	.176	.270
Zac Veen	36	69	10	16	3	1	3	13	2	7	.232	.435
Sterlin Thompson	27	69	7	16	4	0	2	10	0	5	.232	.377
Chad Stevens	16	28	1	1	0	0	0	3	0	5	.036	.036
Ryan Ritter	16	19	2	3	0	0	0	1	0	1	.158	.158
Vimael Machín	3	6	0	3	0	0	0	0	0	0	.500	.500
Totals	162	5517	752	1399	283	39	180	721	109	500	.254	.417

=== Pitching ===
Note: W = Wins; L = Losses; ERA = Earned run average; G = Games pitched; GS = Games started; SV = Saves; IP = Innings pitched; H = Hits allowed; R = Runs allowed; ER = Earned runs allowed; BB = Walks allowed; SO = Strikeouts

Player	W	L	ERA	G	GS	SV	IP	H	R	ER	BB	SO
Tomoyuki Sugano	12	12	5.37	29	29	0	154.1	167	95	92	36	96
Kyle Freeland	4	12	6.65	26	26	0	135.1	177	104	100	29	108
Ryan Feltner	7	10	5.40	26	22	0	123.1	133	82	74	53	92
Michael Lorenzen	3	11	7.08	26	25	0	115.2	168	102	91	49	82
Tanner Gordon	1	6	6.68	24	12	0	103.2	148	79	77	24	85
Zach Agnos	0	2	5.93	41	3	2	91.0	102	64	60	35	58
Juan Mejía	4	6	5.27	65	1	4	70.0	78	44	41	40	66
Brennan Bernardino	4	3	2.81	74	2	2	64.0	59	25	20	15	49
Gabriel Hughes	0	8	6.33	14	13	1	64.0	68	46	45	24	56
Jimmy Herget	0	6	5.70	51	3	3	53.2	56	37	34	26	47
Antonio Senzatela	9	2	3.61	34	0	3	52.1	51	24	21	17	46
José Quintana	2	3	5.44	11	11	0	48.0	52	32	29	20	25
Chase Dollander	3	3	3.89	10	3	0	44.0	39	19	19	18	47
Jaden Hill	1	4	5.22	46	0	2	39.2	36	23	23	23	40
Victor Vodnik	3	3	5.25	33	0	4	36.0	42	24	21	19	26
Mason Adams	0	2	4.03	6	6	0	29.0	31	17	13	12	31
Blas Castaño	2	0	3.62	15	0	0	27.1	27	12	11	9	21
Jordan Romano	0	2	4.21	27	0	11	25.2	18	13	12	13	27
Sean Sullivan	0	3	8.87	5	5	0	22.1	34	22	22	11	16
Nick Frasso	1	1	5.82	20	0	0	21.2	25	15	14	7	22
Seth Halvorsen	0	1	4.74	21	0	0	19.0	22	10	10	15	17
Mark Manfredi	1	2	3.06	14	0	0	17.2	15	6	6	9	16
Keegan Thompson	0	0	8.25	5	0	0	12.0	19	11	11	2	11
Valente Bellozo	0	1	7.59	3	0	0	10.2	10	10	9	7	8
TJ Shook	0	0	8.22	5	0	0	7.2	12	7	7	2	7
Brett Sullivan	0	0	4.70	7	0	0	7.2	11	4	4	2	1
Parker Mushinski	1	0	2.70	8	0	0	6.2	9	2	2	5	0
John Brebbia	0	0	10.38	3	0	0	4.1	7	5	5	0	2
Jeff Criswell	0	0	4.50	3	0	0	4.0	4	2	2	3	3
Eiberson Castellano	0	0	0.00	1	0	1	3.0	4	0	0	0	2
Sammy Peralta	0	1	10.13	2	1	0	2.2	3	3	3	2	4
Welinton Herrera	0	0	0.00	3	0	0	2.1	2	0	0	1	2
Troy Johnston	0	0	0.00	2	0	0	2.0	1	0	0	1	0
Blake Adams	0	0	45.00	1	0	0	1.0	5	5	5	2	0
Totals	58	104	5.59	162	162	33	1421.2	1635	944	883	531	1113

Note: No ERA qualifier/leader noted as no pitcher pitched 162.0 innings.(1 inning pitched per played game.)

== Farm system ==
Level	Team	League	Manager	W	L	Position (as of June 2, 2026)
AAA	Albuquerque Isotopes	Pacific Coast League (East Division)	Pedro Lopez	32	25	2nd Place; 2 GB
AA	Hartford Yard Goats	Eastern League (Northeast Division)	Robinson Cancel	27	22	1st Place
High A	Spokane Indians	Northwest League	Tom Sutaris	21	30	5th Place; 16 GB
Low A	Fresno Grizzlies	California League (North Division)	Cesar Galvez	27	24	2nd Place; 2 GB
Rookie	ACL Rockies	Arizona Complex League (East Division)	Fred Ocasio	15	7	1st Place
Foreign Rookie	DSL Rockies	Dominican Summer League (East Division)	Mauricio Gonzalez	1	1	
Foreign Rookie	DSL Colorado	Dominican Summer League (Southeast Division)	Eugenio Jose	1	1	

== Major League Baseball draft ==
The 2026 draft was held July 11–12, 2026.

2026 Draft Picks

Round	Pick	Name	Position	School	Signed
1	10	Tyler Bell	SS	Kentucky	Yes ($5.998m)
CB-A	37	Daniel Jackson	C	Georgia	Yes ($2.298m)
2	38	Logan Reddemann	P	UCLA	Yes ($2.631m)
3	76	Jack Natili	C	Cincinnati	Yes ($1.098m)
4	104	Ben Davis	P	Mississippi State	Yes ($447.5k)
5	136	Tyler Putnam	P	Battle HS (MO)	Yes ($1.898m)
6	165	Garrett Lambert	P	Mercer	Yes ($550k)
7	194	Jack Scott	P	Central Missouri	Yes ($247.5k)
8	224	Hudson Barrett	P	Oklahoma State	Yes ($197.5k)
9	254	Tanner Sagouspe	P	TCU	Yes ($7.5k)
10	284	Mikiah Negrete	P	Cal State Fullerton	Yes ($7.5k)
11	314	Gavin Swartz	P	Normal Community HS (IL)	Yes ($997.5k)
12	344	Garrett Brewer	P	Auburn	Yes ($147.5k)
13	374	Juriel Collazo	OF	Christian Military Academy HS (PR)	Yes ($147.5k)
14	404	Lorenzo Carrier	OF	Pittsburgh	Yes ($70k)
15	434	Ryan Niedzwiedz	1B	SIU Edwardsville	Yes ($147.5k)
16	464	Sam Larson	P	Tulane	Yes ($112.5k)
17	494	Josh Swink	P	Liberty	Yes ($147.5k)
18	524	Blake Bowen	OF	JSerra Catholic HS (CA)	
19	554	Cort MacDonald	OF	Stanford	Yes ($7.5k)
20	584	Dimitri Williams Jr.	OF	Bishop O'Dowd HS (CA)	

Records
Preceded by 2025	Colorado Rockies seasons 2026	Succeeded by 2027
