= Sterlin =

Sterlin is a masculine given name. Notable people with the name include:

- Sterlin Gilbert (born 1978), American football coach
- Sterlin Harjo (born 1979), American filmmaker
- Sterlin Thompson (born 2001), American baseball outfielder
