= Chad Smith (baseball, born 1995) =

American baseball player (born 1995)

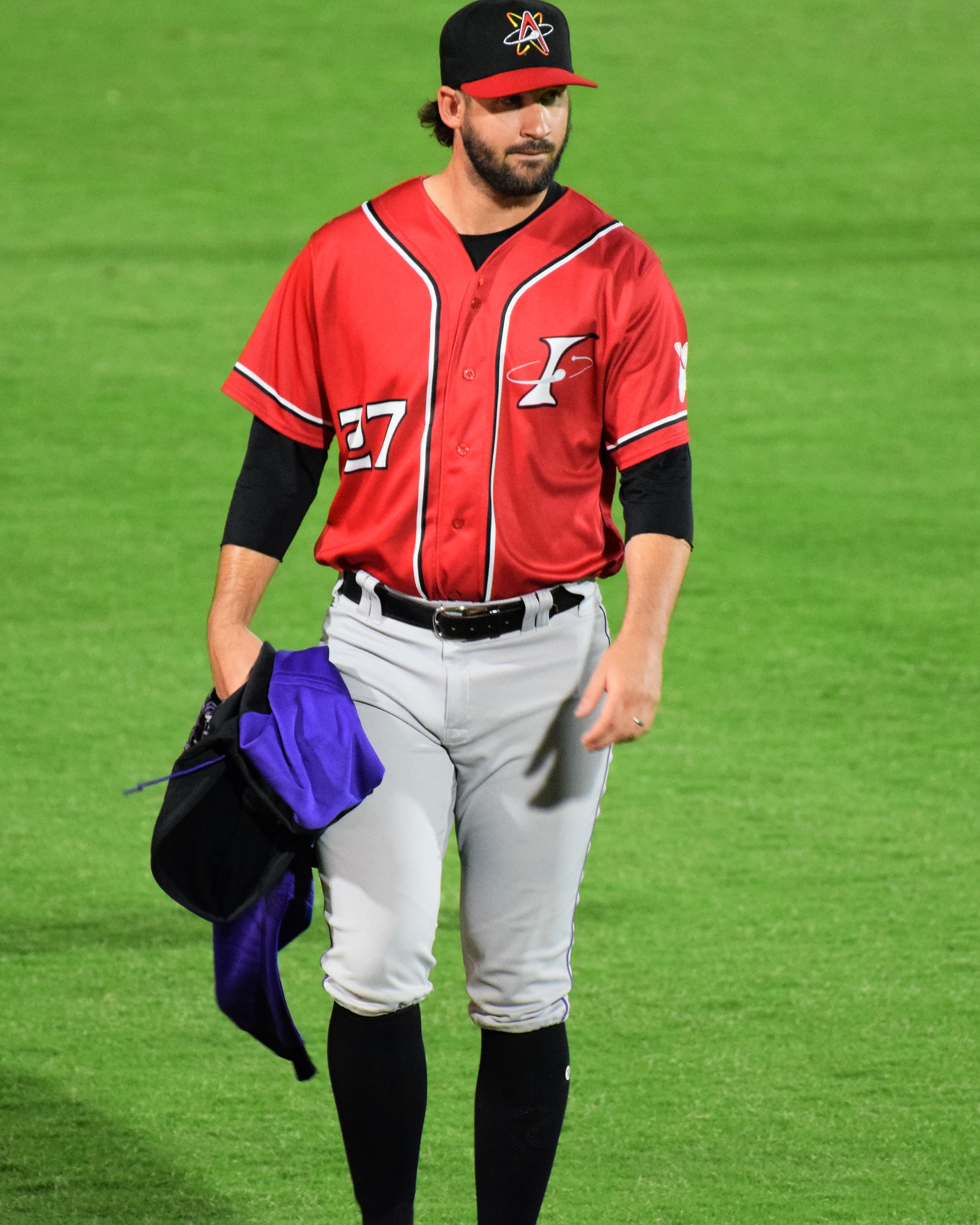
- Smith with the Albuquerque Isotopes in 2022
- Pitcher
- Born: June 8, 1995 (age 31); McCalla, Alabama, U.S.
- Batted: Right Threw: Right

MLB debut
- May 29, 2022, for the Colorado Rockies

Last appearance
- July 23, 2023, for the Oakland Athletics

Career statistics
- Win–loss record: 1–3
- Earned run average: 7.11
- Strikeouts: 32
- Stats at Baseball Reference

Teams
- Colorado Rockies (2022); Oakland Athletics (2023)

Rodney Chad Smith (born June 8, 1995) is an American former professional baseball pitcher. He has previously played in Major League Baseball (MLB) for the Colorado Rockies and Oakland Athletics.

== Career ==
Smith graduated from McAdory High School in McCalla, Alabama. He enrolled at Wallace State Community College, where he played college baseball for two years. The Cleveland Indians selected him in the 23rd round of the 2015 MLB draft. He did not sign with Cleveland, and transferred to the University of Mississippi, where he played college baseball for the Ole Miss Rebels.

=== Miami Marlins ===
The Miami Marlins selected Smith in the 11th round, 323rd overall, of the 2016 Major League Baseball draft, and signed with the Marlins. He spent his first professional season with the rookie-level Gulf Coast Marlins and Low-A Batavia Muckdogs.

Smith spent the 2017 season with the Single-A Greensboro Grasshoppers, logging a 3-2 record and 2.93 ERA with 52 strikeouts and 7 saves in 34 appearances. In 2018, he pitched in 30 games for the High-A Jupiter Hammerheads, registering a 5-3 record and 3.57 ERA with 45 strikeouts in 35.1 innings of work. He additionally led the organization in saves (tied with Jumbo Díaz, with 12.

Smith split the 2019 season between Jupiter and the Double-A Jacksonville Jumbo Shrimp, pitching to a cumulative 3-2 record and 4.54 ERA with 46 strikeouts and 6 saves in 41.2 innings of work across 34 games. He did not play in a game in 2020 due to the cancellation of the minor league season because of the COVID-19 pandemic.

=== Colorado Rockies ===
On August 13, 2020, the Marlins traded Smith to the Colorado Rockies in exchange for Jesús Tinoco. Smith spent the 2021 season with the Triple-A Albuquerque Isotopes, posting a 2.97 ERA with 37 strikeouts in 33.1 innings pitched. He was assigned to Albuquerque to begin the 2022 season.

On May 28, 2022, Smith was selected to the 40-man roster and promoted to the major leagues for the first time. He made his major league debut on May 29. He made 15 appearances for Colorado in his rookie campaign, logging a 7.50 ERA with 23 strikeouts in 18.0 innings pitched.

=== Oakland Athletics ===
On December 6, 2022, the Rockies traded Smith to the Oakland Athletics for minor-league pitcher Jeff Criswell. Smith was optioned to the Triple-A Las Vegas Aviators to begin the 2023 season. The Athletics promoted him to the major leagues and he earned his first major league win on April 12. In 9 games for Oakland, Smith recorded a 6.75 ERA with 9 strikeouts in 12.0 innings of work. On July 4, he was designated for assignment after Manny Piña was activated from the injured list. He cleared waivers and was sent outright to Triple–A Las Vegas on July 6. On July 22, Smith was selected back to the major league roster. In 10 games for Oakland, he pitched to a 6.59 ERA with 9 strikeouts across 13 2/3 innings pitched. Following the season on November 6, Smith was removed from the 40–man roster and sent outright to Triple–A Las Vegas. He elected free agency the same day.

=== New York Mets ===
On December 26, 2023, Smith signed a minor league contract with the New York Mets. He was released by the Mets organization on March 25, 2024.

== Personal life ==
His grandfather, Norm Zauchin, played in MLB in the 1950s.
