= Tyler Jay =

American baseball player (born 1994)

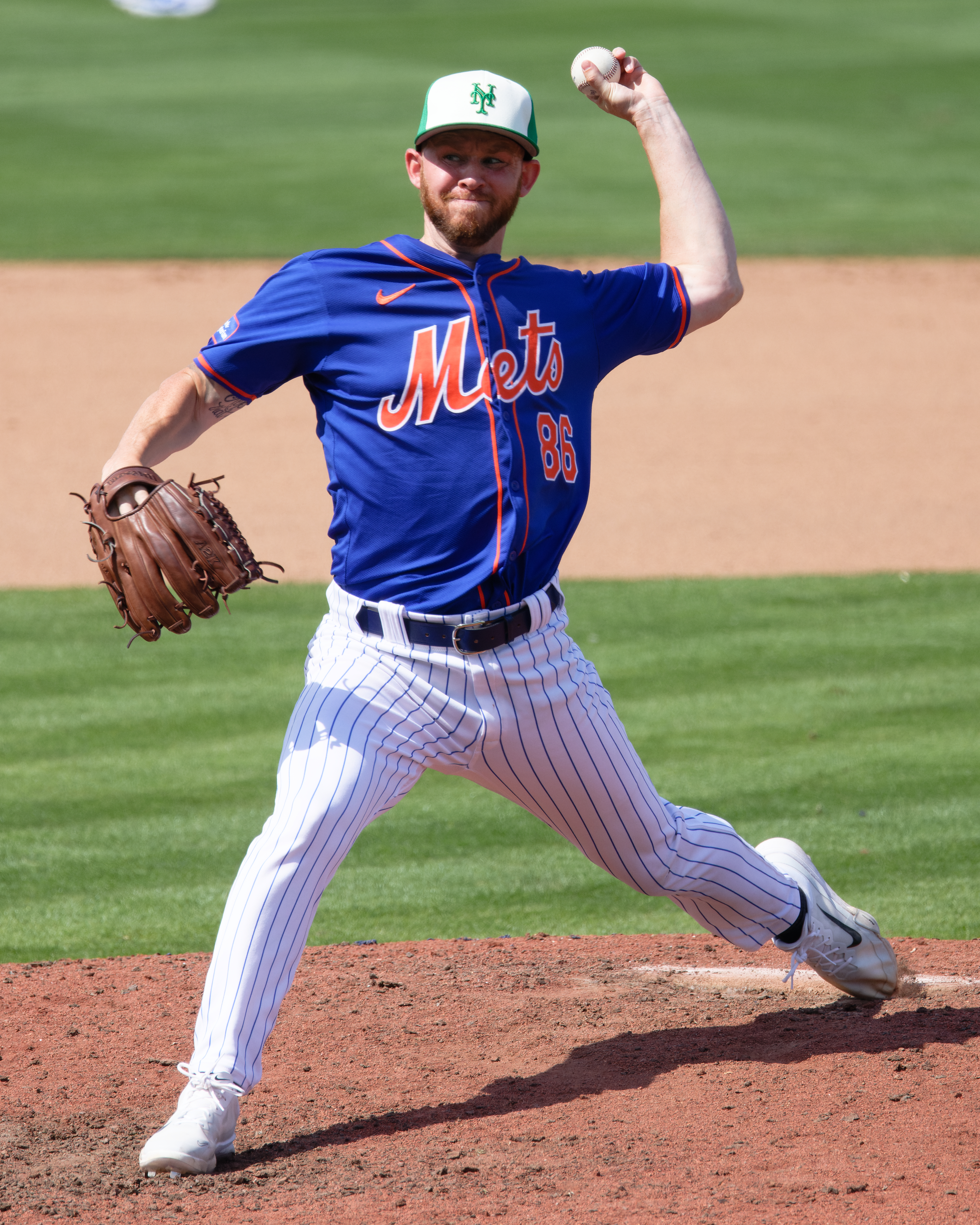
- Jay with the New York Mets in 2024

Free agent
- Pitcher
- Born: April 19, 1994 (age 32); Lemont, Illinois, U.S.
- Bats: Left Throws: Left

MLB debut
- April 11, 2024, for the New York Mets

MLB statistics (through 2024 season)
- Win–loss record: 0–0
- Earned run average: 4.70
- Strikeouts: 6
- Stats at Baseball Reference

Teams
- New York Mets (2024); Milwaukee Brewers (2024)

Tyler Ryan Jay (born April 19, 1994) is an American professional baseball pitcher who is a free agent. He has previously played in Major League Baseball (MLB) for the New York Mets and Milwaukee Brewers. Jay played college baseball at the University of Illinois and was drafted by the Minnesota Twins in the first round of the 2015 MLB draft. He made his MLB debut in 2024 with the Mets.

== Career ==
=== Amateur career ===
Jay attended Lemont High School in Lemont, Illinois. He played both baseball and football at Lemont. Jay committed to the University of Illinois Urbana-Champaign to play college baseball for the Fighting Illini. As a freshman, he appeared in 18 games, pitching to a 1–3 win–loss record with a 3.10 earned run average (ERA) and 20 strikeouts. As a sophomore in 2014, he took over as the closer and had 10 saves, a 1.94 ERA and 47 strikeouts. After the season, Jay played for the United States collegiate national team during the summer, and also played collegiate summer baseball for the Yarmouth-Dennis Red Sox of the Cape Cod Baseball League. As a junior in 2015, he had a 1.08 ERA, 76 strikeouts and 14 saves.

=== Minnesota Twins ===
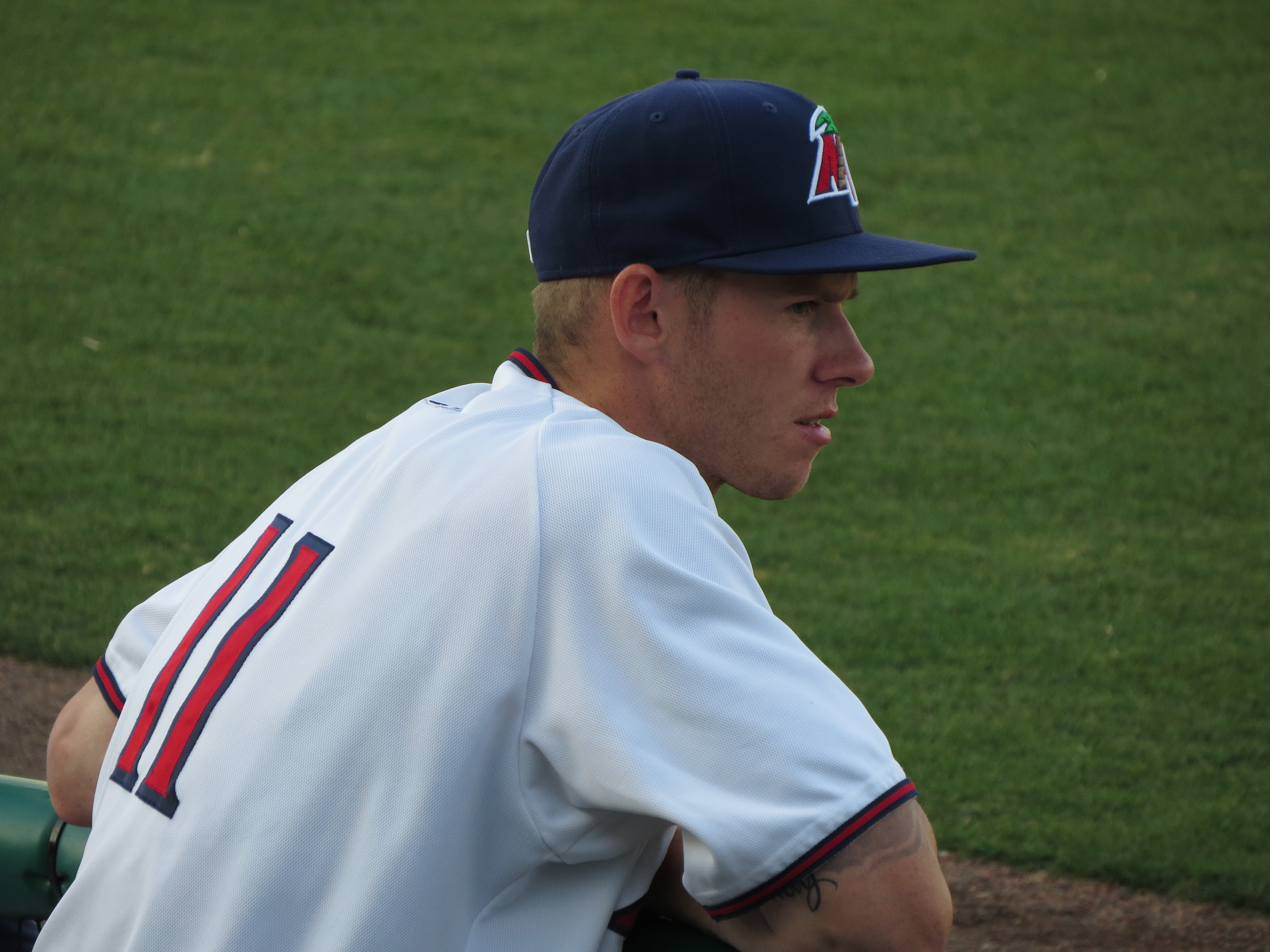
Jay with the Fort Myers Miracle

Jay was considered one of the top prospects for the 2015 Major League Baseball draft. The Minnesota Twins selected him with the sixth overall pick. He officially signed with the Twins on June 17 and was assigned to the Fort Myers Miracle where he posted a 3.93 ERA in 18 1/3 innings pitched. The Twins transitioned Jay into a starting pitcher with Fort Myers in 2016, where he posted a 5–5 record with a 2.84 ERA in 13 starts before being promoted to the Chattanooga Lookouts where he pitched to a 5.79 ERA in five games (two starts). He pitched only 11 2/3 innings in 2017 due to injury. Jay returned in 2018 to pitch for the Chattanooga Lookouts, compiling a 4–5 record with a 4.22 ERA in 38 games. Jay would begin the 2019 season with the Chattanooga Lookouts where he posted a 1–2 record with a 4.82 ERA in 17 appearances. In 2019, he began struggling to swallow as a result of eosinophilic esophagitis and started to lose weight, which correlated with a decline in his on-field performance.

=== Cincinnati Reds ===
On June 10, 2019, Jay was traded to the Cincinnati Reds in exchange for cash considerations. Jay would spend the rest of the 2019 season between the Pensacola Blue Wahoos and the Arizona League Reds where he posted a 0–0 record with a 3.03 ERA in 18 appearances and a 9.00 ERA in two appearances respectively. He did not play in a game in 2020 due to the cancellation of the minor league season because of the COVID-19 pandemic. On June 1, 2020, Jay was released by the Reds.

=== Joliet Slammers ===
By 2022, Jay's health problems which had correlated with his decline in performance were attributed to a diagnosis of eosinophilic esophagitis. After spending 2021 out of baseball and focusing on his health, Jay asked Joliet Slammers manager Daniel Schlereth for a tryout and signed with the Frontier League team on June 7, 2022. In 22 appearances for Joliet, he registered a 1.64 ERA with 24 strikeouts and eight saves in 22 innings of work. In 2023, Jay made 20 appearances (7 starts) for the Slammers, logging a 4–3 record and 4.26 ERA with 64 strikeouts and seven saves in 57 innings pitched.

=== New York Mets ===
On August 24, 2023, Jay's contract was purchased by the New York Mets organization. He spent the remainder of the year with the Triple–A Syracuse Mets, posting a 6.00 ERA with 8 strikeouts across 6 appearances.

Jay began the 2024 season back in Syracuse, logging a scoreless appearance for the affiliate to start the year. On April 10, 2024, the Mets selected Jay's contract and promoted him to the major leagues for the first time. He made his MLB debut the next day, pitching two innings against the Atlanta Braves. In his second appearance, he recorded two scoreless innings against the Kansas City Royals. However, on April 17, Jay was designated for assignment after Michael Tonkin was claimed off waivers. He was outrighted to Triple-A Syracuse two days later after going unclaimed off waivers. On June 30, the Mets purchased Jay's contract, adding him back to the major league roster. However, on July 2, he was optioned back to Triple–A having made just one appearance. Jay was designated for assignment a second time on July 17.

=== Milwaukee Brewers ===
On July 21, 2024, Jay was traded to the Milwaukee Brewers in exchange for TJ Shook. He made 2 scoreless appearances for Milwaukee, logging 3 strikeouts across 3 innings of work. Jay was designated for assignment by the Brewers following the acquisition of Grant Anderson on January 2, 2025.

On January 9, 2025, Jay was claimed off waivers by the Seattle Mariners. He was designated for assignment by the Mariners on January 21. Jay elected free agency in lieu of an outright assignment to the Triple-A Tacoma Rainiers on January 28. On February 3, Jay re-signed with the Brewers organization on a minor league contract. He made 28 appearances for Triple-A Nashville, posting a 2-1 record and 3.33 ERA with 21 strikeouts and two saves over 27 innings of work. Jay was released by the Brewers organization on July 17.
