= Donny Sands =

American baseball player (born 1996)

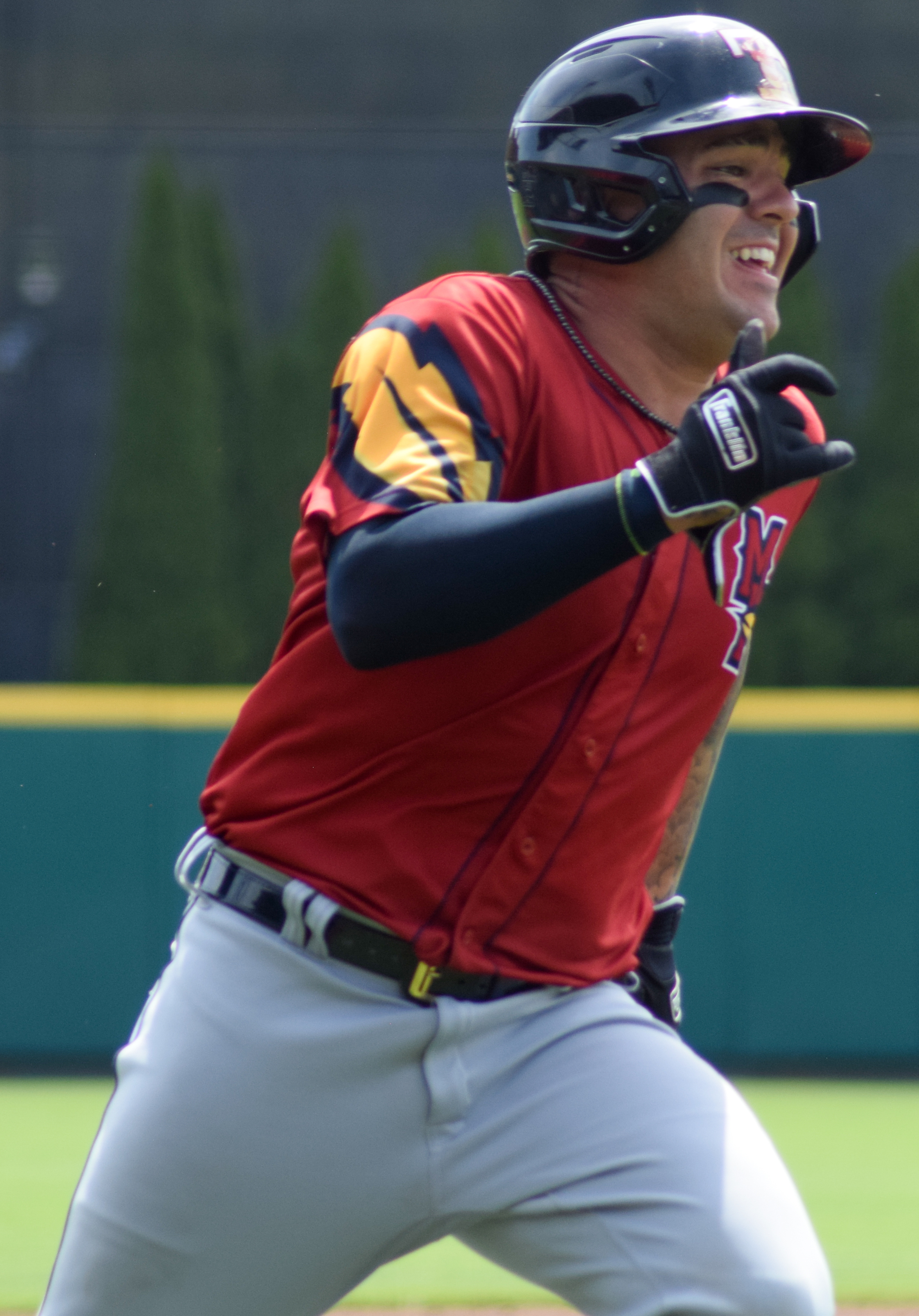
- Sands with the Toledo Mud Hens in 2023

Saraperos de Saltillo – No. 2
- Catcher
- Born: May 16, 1996 (age 30); Tucson, Arizona, U.S.
- Bats: Right Throws: Right

MLB debut
- September 2, 2022, for the Philadelphia Phillies

MLB statistics (through 2022 season)
- Batting average: .000
- Home runs: 0
- Runs batted in: 0
- Stats at Baseball Reference

Teams
- Philadelphia Phillies (2022)

Donny Sands (born May 16, 1996) is an American professional baseball catcher for the Saraperos de Saltillo of the Mexican League. He has previously played in Major League Baseball (MLB) for the Philadelphia Phillies.

== Early life and career ==
Sands was born in Tucson, Arizona, and he lived there until he was in the third grade. His family moved to Albuquerque, New Mexico, and he served as a batboy for the New Mexico Lobos, the college baseball team at the University of New Mexico. Sands, whose mother is of Mexican descent, also spent time in his youth living in Ciudad Obregón in Sonora, Mexico.

Sands' father, Roger, died of a heart attack in 2012. He moved with his mother, Alma, back to Tucson. After a year, Alma moved back to Mexico to find work, while Donny lived in her Toyota Camry and attended high school. He attended Empire High School for two years before he transferred to Salpointe Catholic High School. For Salpointe's baseball team, Sands had a .437 batting average and 58 runs batted in (RBIs) in 52 games played. As a pitcher, Sands had 58 strikeouts in 34 1/3 innings pitched. Sands committed to attend the University of New Mexico.

== Professional career ==
=== New York Yankees ===
The New York Yankees selected Sands in the eighth round, with the 243rd overall selection, of the 2015 Major League Baseball draft as a third baseman. Sands signed with the Yankees, rather than attend college, receiving a $100,000 signing bonus, below the slot value for the pick. He made his professional debut with the Gulf Coast Yankees of the Rookie-level Gulf Coast League (GCL). After his first season, the Yankees approached Sands about becoming a catcher, and he agreed. In 2016, he committed 14 passed balls in 20 games in the GCL and with the Pulaski Yankees of the Rookie-level Appalachian League.

In 2017, Sands played for the Charleston RiverDogs of the Single–A South Atlantic League and the Tampa Yankees of the High–A Florida State League. In 93 games, he had 25 passed balls. He committed eight passed balls in 2018, and played in the Arizona Fall League after the 2019 regular season. The 2020 season was cancelled due to the COVID-19 shutdown, and Sands worked on his defense independently.

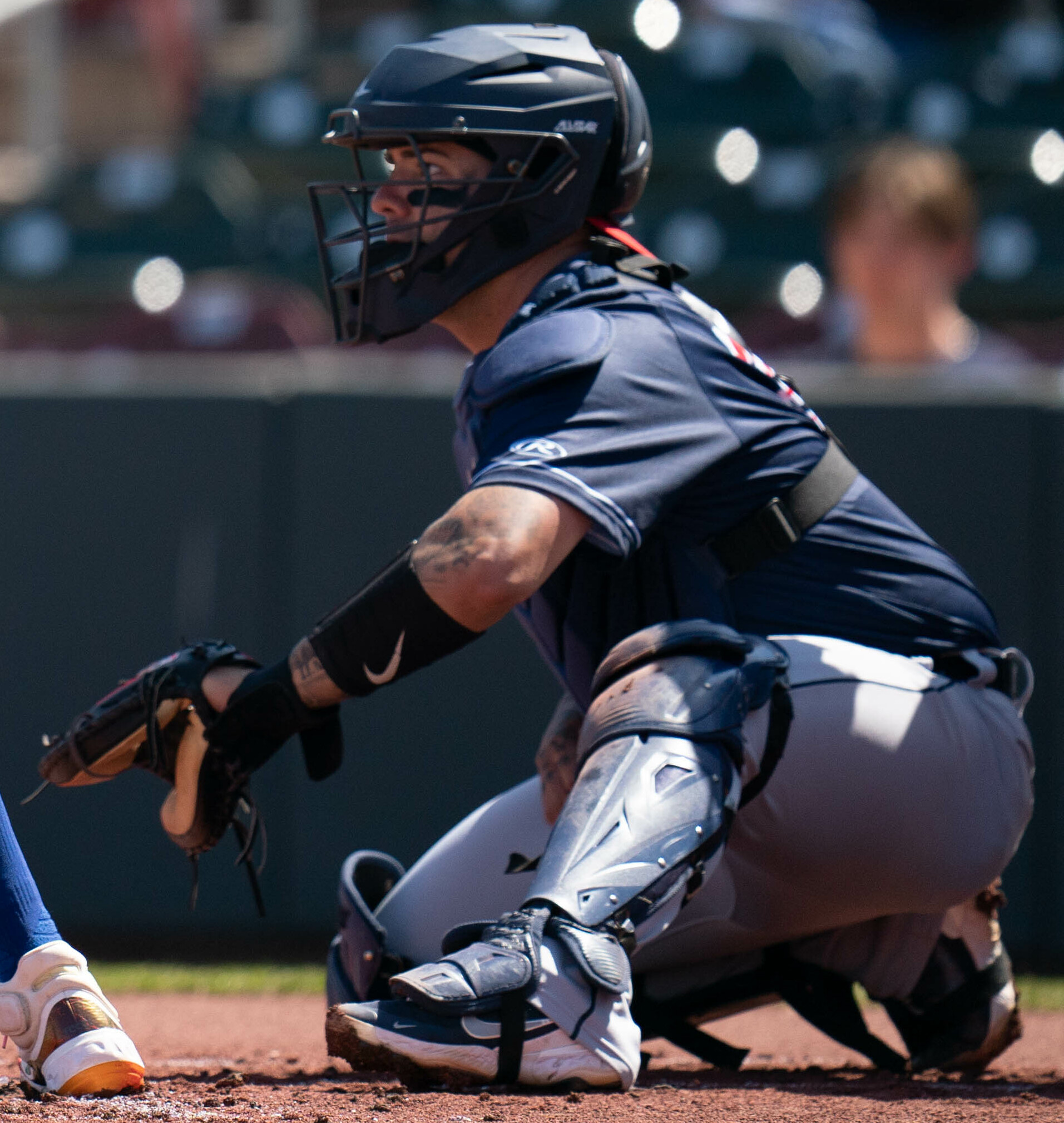
Sands catching for the Toledo Mud Hens in 2023

Sands began the 2021 season with the Somerset Patriots of the Double–A Eastern League, and was promoted to the Scranton/Wilkes-Barre RailRiders of the Triple–A International League during the season. With the RailRiders, Sands batted .272 and had one passed ball in 42 games. The Yankees added Sands to their 40-man roster to protect him from being exposed to the Rule 5 draft after the season.

=== Philadelphia Phillies ===
On November 19, 2021, the Yankees traded Sands and Nick Nelson to the Philadelphia Phillies in exchange for T. J. Rumfield and Joel Valdez. The Phillies assigned Sands to the Triple-A Lehigh Valley IronPigs in 2022. He was recalled to the majors on September 1 as a September addition. He played in 3 games for the Phillies, with 4 four plate appearances and 1 walk.

=== Detroit Tigers ===
On January 7, 2023, the Phillies traded Sands, Matt Vierling, and Nick Maton to the Detroit Tigers in exchange for Gregory Soto and Kody Clemens. The Tigers optioned him to the Triple–A Toledo Mud Hens for the start of the 2023 season. In 93 games split between Toledo and the Double–A Erie SeaWolves, he batted .230/.318/.360 with six home runs and 40 RBIs. After the season on December 22, 2023, Sands was designated for assignment by the Tigers. On January 5, 2024, Sands cleared waivers and was sent outright to Triple–A Toledo. He was released by the Tigers organization on March 26.

=== Toros de Tijuana ===
On April 11, 2024, Sands signed with the Toros de Tijuana of the Mexican League. In 16 games, Sands batted .245/.339/.490 with four home runs and 13 RBI.

=== San Francisco Giants ===
On May 10, 2024, Sands had his contract purchased by the San Francisco Giants organization. In 13 games for the Triple–A Sacramento River Cats, he hit .177/.250/.196 with no home runs and five RBI. Sands was released by the Giants on June 9.

=== Toros de Tijuana (second stint) ===
On June 12, 2024, Sands re–signed with the Toros de Tijuana of the Mexican League. In 37 appearances for Tijuana, he slashed .292/.384/.492 with seven home runs, 25 RBI, and one stolen base. Sands was released by the Toros on March 24, 2025.

=== Charros de Jalisco ===
On April 8, 2025, Sands signed with the Charros de Jalisco of the Mexican League. In 66 games, he hit .318/.373/.559 with 14 home runs, 61 RBI and three stolen bases.

Sands played in 33 games for Jalisco in 2026, batting .194/.257/.272 with one home run and 10 RBI.

=== Saraperos de Saltillo ===
On June 8, 2026, Sands and Luis Payán were traded to the Saraperos de Saltillo of the Mexican League in exchange for Manny Barreda and Alex Mejia.
