= Blas Castaño =

Dominican baseball player (born 1998)

Colorado Rockies – No. 63
- Pitcher
- Born: September 8, 1998 (age 28); Espaillat, Dominican Republic
- Bats: Right Throws: Right

MLB debut
- May 28, 2025, for the Seattle Mariners

MLB statistics (through 2026 season)
- Win–loss record: 2–0
- Earned run average: 4.15
- Strikeouts: 22
- Stats at Baseball Reference

Teams
- Seattle Mariners (2025); Colorado Rockies (2026–present)

Blas Castaño (born September 8, 1998) is a Dominican professional baseball pitcher for the Colorado Rockies of Major League Baseball (MLB). He made his MLB debut in 2025 with the Seattle Mariners.

== Career ==
=== New York Yankees ===
Castaño signed with the New York Yankees on June 1, 2018 and joined the Dominican Summer League Yankees that summer. He made his stateside debut in 2019 with the rookie-level Gulf Coast League Yankees. Castaño did not play in a game in 2020 due to the cancellation of the minor league season because of the COVID-19 pandemic.

Castaño returned to action in 2021 with the rookie-level Florida Complex League Yankees and Single-A Tampa Tarpons. In 10 appearances (eight starts) split between the two affiliates, he accumulated a 6/2 record and 4.17 ERA with 55 strikeouts across 45 1/3 innings pitched. Castaño split the 2022 campaign between the High-A Hudson Valley Renegades and Double-A Somerset Patriots, pitching to a cumulative 5-9 record and 3.86 ERA with 103 strikeouts over 22 appearances (21 starts).

Castaño spent the majority of the 2023 season with the Double-A Somerset Patriots, also making two appearances for the Triple-A Scranton/Wilkes-Barre RailRiders; in 17 outings for Somerset, he logged a 4-3 record and 4.76 ERA with 42 strikeouts. Castaño was released by the Yankees organization on August 8, 2023.

=== Seattle Mariners ===
On August 11, 2023, Castaño signed a minor league contract with the Seattle Mariners and spent the rest of the season with the Double-A Arkansas Travelers. Castaño split the 2024 campaign between Double-A Arkansas and the Triple-A Tacoma Rainiers. In 29 games (26 starts) for the two affiliates, he accumulated a 5–8 record and 4.38 ERA with 108 strikeouts across 125 1/3 innings pitched. On November 4, 2024, the Mariners added Castaño to their 40-man roster to prevent him from reaching minor league free agency.

Castaño was optioned to Triple-A Tacoma to begin the 2025 season. In 10 appearances (7 starts), he logged a 2-1 record and 3.43 ERA with 28 strikeouts across 44 2/3 innings pitched. On May 23, Castaño was promoted to the major leagues for the first time. He pitched in one MLB game, allowing three runs, including Robert Hassell III's first MLB home run, in the final three innings of a loss to the Washington Nationals on May 28. Castaño returned to Tacoma, where he pitched the rest of the season.

Castaño was optioned to Triple-A Tacoma to begin the 2026 season. He made six appearances for the Rainiers, logging a 3-1 record and 1.42 ERA with four strikeouts across 6 1/3 innings pitched. On April 14, 2026, Castaño was designated for assignment by the Mariners.

=== Colorado Rockies ===
On April 21, 2026, the Colorado Rockies claimed Castaño off waivers. On June 16, Castaño recorded his first career win, logging 1 1/3 scoreless innings of relief against the Chicago Cubs.
