= Jeff Criswell (baseball) =

American baseball player (born 1999)

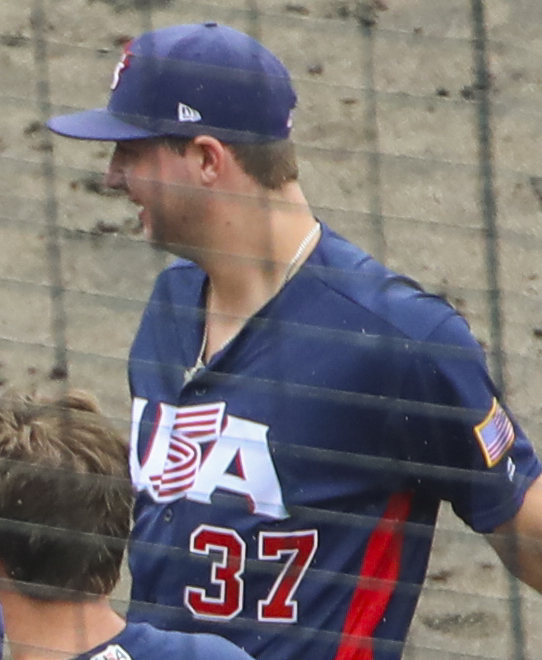
- Criswell with the United States national collegiate baseball team in 2019

Colorado Rockies – No. 46
- Pitcher
- Born: March 10, 1999 (age 27); Portage, Michigan, U.S.
- Bats: Right Throws: Right

MLB debut
- August 21, 2024, for the Colorado Rockies

MLB statistics (through 2026 season)
- Win–loss record: 1–0
- Earned run average: 3.04
- Strikeouts: 30
- Stats at Baseball Reference

Teams
- Colorado Rockies (2024, 2026–present)

Jeffrey Kelley Criswell (born March 10, 1999) is an American professional baseball pitcher for the Colorado Rockies of Major League Baseball (MLB). He played college baseball at the University of Michigan and was selected by the Oakland Athletics in the second round of the 2020 MLB draft. He made his MLB debut in 2024 with the Rockies.

== Amateur career ==
Criswell attended Portage Central High School in Portage, Michigan. He was selected by the Detroit Tigers in the 35th round of the 2017 Major League Baseball draft but did not sign and instead enrolled at the University of Michigan where he played college baseball.

In 2018, Criswell's freshman year at Michigan, he went 3–2 with a 2.23 earned run average in 24 relief appearances. In 2018, he played collegiate summer baseball with the Brewster Whitecaps of the Cape Cod Baseball League. As a sophomore in 2019, he moved into the starting rotation and had a 7–1 record and 2.74 earned run average in 18 games (17 starts). He was named a first-team All-Big Ten Conference pitcher. That summer, he pitched for the U.S. collegiate national team. He had the lowest batting average against on the team, earning a save against Chinese Taipei.

In 2020, his junior season, he went 0–1 with a 4.50 earned run average and 26 strikeouts in 24 innings before the season was ended short due to the COVID-19 pandemic.

== Professional career ==
=== Oakland Athletics ===
The Oakland Athletics selected Criswell in the second round (58th overall) of the 2020 Major League Baseball draft. He signed for $1 million. He did not play a minor league game in that year due to the cancellation of the minor league season caused by the COVID-19 pandemic.

To begin the 2021 season, Criswell was assigned to the Lansing Lugnuts of the High-A Central. After his first start, he was placed on the injured list with a shoulder injury. He missed nearly four months before being activated in late August; he pitched 12 innings during the season, giving up six earned runs and four walks while striking out 12. He was selected to play in the Arizona Fall League for the Mesa Solar Sox after the season. He returned to Lansing to begin the 2022 season. In mid-June, he was promoted to the Midland RockHounds of the Double-A Texas League, and he was promoted once again, to the Las Vegas Aviators of the Triple-A Pacific Coast League, near the season's end. Over 24 games (21 starts) between the three teams, he went 4–10 with a 4.03 earned run average and 119 strikeouts in 118 1/3 innings.

=== Colorado Rockies ===
On December 6, 2022, the Athletics traded Criswell to the Colorado Rockies in exchange for pitcher Chad Smith. For the 2023 season, he was assigned to the Albuquerque Isotopes of the Triple-A Pacific Coast League. Over 29 games (26 starts), Criswell went 5–10 with a 7.51 earned run average and 135 strikeouts in 121 innings.

Criswell returned to Albuquerque to open the 2024 season. On August 21, he was selected to the 40-man roster and promoted to the major leagues for the first time. He made his debut later that day against the Washington Nationals, pitching a scoreless bottom of the seventh inning, allowing a hit to Keibert Ruiz in an eventual 6–1 loss. On August 25, in Criswell's third career appearance, he came in to face the New York Yankees in the bottom of the seventh inning. After retiring Gleyber Torres on a ground ball to second, Criswell surrendered back-to-back-to-back home runs to Juan Soto, Aaron Judge and Giancarlo Stanton before Jazz Chisholm Jr. grounded out to Criswell and Anthony Volpe struck out. The Rockies lost the game 10–3. In 13 games for Colorado, Criswell had a 1–0 record and 2.75 ERA with 27 strikeouts across 19 2/3 innings pitched.

On March 2, 2025, it was announced that Criswell would undergo Tommy John surgery and miss the entirety of the 2025 season. Criswell was transferred to the 60-day injured list on April 14.

Criswell made his first appearance in 2026 on rehab assignment with the Spokane Indians on April 29, and also rehabbed with the Hartford Yard Goats and Albuquerque. On May 28, he was activated from the injured list and optioned to Triple-A Albuquerque. Criswell was recalled by the Rockies for the first time during the season on June 9, and was also recalled on July 11. He was placed on the injured list by the Rockies on July 18 with a right shoulder strain and was then optioned to Albuquerque upon being activated on August 12. With Colorado in 2026, Criswell pitched four innings and gave up two earned runs, three walks, and also recorded three strikeouts. He made 28 appearances with Albuquerque and had a 1–1 record, a 5.61 ERA, and 40 strikeouts over 33 2/3 innings pitched.

== Personal life ==
Criswell's father Brian was also a pitcher drafted by Oakland. Brian pitched for five seasons in the minors, reaching Double-A. Criswell's sister was a collegiate swimmer for the Bowling Green Falcons.
