= Mason Adams (baseball) =

American baseball player (born 2000)

Colorado Rockies – No. 38
- Pitcher
- Born: February 23, 2000 (age 26); Davenport, Iowa, U.S.
- Bats: Right Throws: Right

MLB debut
- August 25, 2026, for the Colorado Rockies

MLB statistics (through 2026 season)
- Win–loss record: 0-2
- Earned run average: 4.03
- Strikeouts: 31
- Stats at Baseball Reference

Teams
- Colorado Rockies (2026–present)

Mason Allen Adams (born February 23, 2000) is an American professional baseball pitcher for the Colorado Rockies of Major League Baseball (MLB). He made his debut in MLB in 2026.

== Amateur career ==
Adams attended Okeechobee High School in Okeechobee, Florida and played college baseball at Florida SouthWestern State College and Jacksonville University.

== Professional career ==
=== Chicago White Sox ===
Adams was selected by the Chicago White Sox in the 13th round of the 2022 MLB draft. He signed with the White Sox and made his professional debut with the Arizona Complex League White Sox. He pitched 2023 with the Kannapolis Cannon Ballers, Winston-Salem Dash, and Birmingham Barons and started 2024 with Birmingham.

=== Colorado Rockies ===
On August 3, 2026, the White Sox traded Adams and Carlos Vielma to the Colorado Rockies in exchange for Brenton Doyle. He made three starts for the Triple–A Albuquerque Isotopes, recording a 2.08 ERA with 13 strikeouts over 13 innings pitched. On August 24, it was announced that the Rockies were planning to promote Adams to the major leagues for the first time.
