= TJ Rumfield =

American baseball player (born 2000)

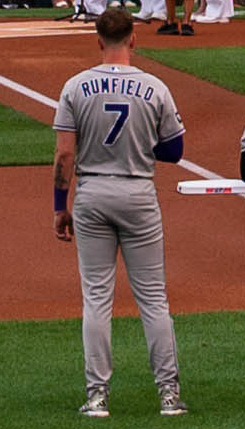
- Rumfield with the Colorado Rockies in 2026

Colorado Rockies – No. 7
- First baseman
- Born: May 17, 2000 (age 26); Richmond, Virginia, U.S.
- Bats: Left Throws: Right

MLB debut
- March 27, 2026, for the Colorado Rockies

MLB statistics (through 2026 season)
- Batting average: .300
- Home runs: 16
- Runs batted in: 73
- Stats at Baseball Reference

Teams
- Colorado Rockies (2026–present)

Toby Joseph Rumfield (born May 17, 2000) is an American professional baseball first baseman for the Colorado Rockies of Major League Baseball (MLB). He made his MLB debut in 2026.

== Amateur career ==
Rumfield attended Temple High School in Temple, Texas. He enrolled at Texas Tech University. After taking a redshirt in 2019, his freshman year, Rumfield played college baseball for the Texas Tech Red Raiders in 2020. That summer, he signed on to play with the Kalamazoo Growlers of the Northwoods League. He entered the transfer portal in 2020 as he was looking to play for a school that would give him more playing time. Rumfield transferred to Virginia Tech and played for the Virginia Tech Hokies in 2021.

== Professional career ==
=== Philadelphia Phillies ===
The Philadelphia Phillies selected Rumfield in the 12th round of the 2021 Major League Baseball draft. He made his professional debut for the Single-A Clearwater Threshers, slashing .250/.426/.263 with seven runs batted in (RBI).

=== New York Yankees ===
On November 19, 2021, the Phillies traded Rumfield and Joel Valdez to the New York Yankees in exchange for Donny Sands and Nick Nelson. In 2022, he played for the Hudson Valley Renegades. In 2023, he played for the Somerset Patriots and won the Minor League Gold Glove Award for first basemen. Rumfield played for the Triple-A Scranton/Wilkes-Barre RailRiders for the 2024 and 2025 seasons.

=== Colorado Rockies ===
On January 28, 2026, the Yankees traded Rumfield to the Colorado Rockies in exchange for Angel Chivilli. The Rockies selected Rumfield's contract after he made the team's Opening Day roster. He made his MLB debut on March 27; the next day, Rumfield hit his first career home run off of Eury Pérez of the Miami Marlins. He played in 155 games for the Rockies and ended the season with a .300/.390/.453 slash line with 16 home runs, 73 RBI, and 30 doubles. His .390 on-base percentage led the National League. After the season, Rumfield was named a finalist for the Gold Glove Award for National League first basemen.

== Personal life ==
Rumfield's father, Toby, played in Minor League Baseball for 14 years. Toby coached T. J. at Temple High School.

Awards
Preceded by Sal Stewart; Himself	National League Rookie of the Month; May 2026; June 2026	Succeeded by Himself; Esmerlyn Valdez
