= Sean Sullivan (baseball) =

American baseball player (born 2002)

Chicago White Sox
- Pitcher
- Born: July 22, 2002 (age 24); Boston, Massachusetts, U.S.
- Bats: Right Throws: Left

MLB debut
- June 12, 2026, for the Colorado Rockies

MLB statistics (through 2026 season)
- Win–loss record: 0–3
- Earned run average: 8.87
- Strikeouts: 16
- Stats at Baseball Reference

Teams
- Colorado Rockies (2026)

Sean Joseph Sullivan (born July 22, 2002) is an American professional baseball pitcher for the Chicago White Sox of Major League Baseball (MLB). He debuted in MLB in 2026 with the Colorado Rockies.

== Amateur career ==
Sullivan grew up in Andover, Massachusetts and attended Tabor Academy in Marion, Massachusetts.

Sullivan began his college baseball career at Northwestern University playing for the Wildcats. As a freshman for Northwestern in 2022, he started 13 games and went 5-2 with a 4.45 ERA. After the season, he transferred to Wake Forest University to finish out his career with the Demon Deacons. As a sophomore in 2023, he pitched 69 2/3 innings, striking out 111 batters, and only walking 21. He also had a 5-3 record in 17 appearances where he also had three saves, while having an 2.45 ERA. For his performance on the year Sullivan was named First Team All-ACC. In 2022, he played collegiate summer baseball with the Harwich Mariners of the Cape Cod Baseball League.

== Professional career ==
=== Colorado Rockies ===
The Colorado Rockies selected Sullivan in the second round with the 46th pick in the 2023 Major League Baseball draft. He signed with the Rockies for $1,700,000.

Sullivan made his professional debut after signing with the Arizona Complex League Rockies and also played one game with the Fresno Grizzlies, pitching four scoreless innings between the two teams. He split the 2024 season between the Spokane Indians and Hartford Yard Goats, going 9-2 with a 2.11 ERA and 125 strikeouts over 115 1/3 innings. Sullivan opened the 2025 season on rehab assignments with the ACL Rockies and Fresno before being assigned to Hartford.

Sullivan was assigned to the Triple-A Albuquerque Isotopes to begin the 2026 season, where he logged a 5-3 record and 5.60 ERA with 50 strikeouts across 54 2/3 innings pitched. On June 12, 2026, Sullivan was selected to the 40-man roster and promoted to the major leagues for the first time.

=== Chicago White Sox ===
On November 19, 2026, the Rockies traded Sullivan and Doug Veliz to the Colorado Rockies for Davis Martin and Luis Castillo.
