= Chad Stevens (baseball) =

American baseball player (born 1999)

Free agent
- Infielder
- Born: February 3, 1999 (age 27); Walnut Creek, California, U.S.
- Bats: Right Throws: Right

MLB debut
- July 3, 2025, for the Los Angeles Angels

MLB statistics (through 2026 season)
- Batting average: .073
- Home runs: 0
- Runs batted in: 3
- Stats at Baseball Reference

Teams
- Los Angeles Angels (2025); Colorado Rockies (2026)

Chad David Stevens (born February 3, 1999) is an American professional baseball infielder who is a free agent. He has previously played in Major League Baseball (MLB) for the Los Angeles Angels and Colorado Rockies.

== Career ==
=== Amateur ===
Stevens attended Gig Harbor High School in Gig Harbor, Washington. He was selected by the San Diego Padres in the 40th round of the 2017 Major League Baseball draft, but did not sign and played college baseball at the University of Portland. In 2019, he played collegiate summer baseball with the Wareham Gatemen of the Cape Cod Baseball League.

=== Houston Astros ===
Stevens was selected by the Houston Astros in the 11th round (328th overall) of the 2021 Major League Baseball draft, and signed with the team. He made his professional debut with the Single-A Fayetteville Woodpeckers, hitting .147 with one home run and 12 RBI in 34 games. Stevens played in 85 games for the High-A Asheville Tourists in 2022, slashing .248/.318/.416 with 12 home runs, 60 RBI, and 12 stolen bases.

In 2023, Stevens made 122 appearances for the Double-A Corpus Christi Hooks, batting .220/.333/.397 with 15 home runs, 60 RBI, and 23 stolen bases. He began the 2024 season with Corpus Christi, but hit .153 with one home run and five RHI over 25 contests. On May 7, 2024, Stevens was released by the Astros organization.

=== Los Angeles Angels ===
On May 27, 2024, Stevens signed a minor league contract with the Los Angeles Angels organization. He spent the remainder of the year split between the rookie-level Arizona Complex League Angels, High-A Tri-City Dust Devils, Double-A Rocket City Trash Pandas, and Triple-A Salt Lake Bees.

Stevens was assigned to Triple-A Salt Lake to begin the 2025 season, playing in 72 games and slashing .307/.383/.542 with 14 home runs, 43 RBI, and nine stolen bases. On July 3, 2025, Stevens was selected to the 40-man roster and promoted to the major leagues for the first time. His first MLB hit was a single off Max Scherzer on July 5 against the Toronto Blue Jays. In five appearances for Los Angeles, Stevens went 2-for-13 (.154); he was designated for assignment by the Angels on September 7. He cleared waivers and was sent outright to Triple-A Salt Lake on September 9. Stevens elected free agency following the season on November 6.

=== Colorado Rockies ===
On December 9, 2025, Stevens signed a minor league contract with the Colorado Rockies. He made 40 appearances for the Triple-A Albuquerque Isotopes, batting .362/.435/.523 with three home runs, 25 RBI, and six stolen bases. On May 21, 2026, the Rockies selected Stevens' contract, adding him to their active roster. He made 16 appearances for Colorado, going 1–for–28 (.036) with three RBI and five walks. On November 2, Stevens was removed from the 40–man roster and sent outright to Triple–A Albuquerque.
