= Blake Adams (baseball) =

American baseball player (born 2000)

Colorado Rockies
- Pitcher
- Born: September 11, 2000 (age 26); Springdale, Arkansas, U.S.
- Bats: Right Throws: Right

MLB debut
- August 24, 2026, for the Colorado Rockies

MLB statistics (through 2026 season)
- Win–loss record: 0–0
- Earned run average: 45.00
- Strikeouts: 0
- Stats at Baseball Reference

Teams
- Colorado Rockies (2026)

Blake William Adams (born September 11, 2000) is an American professional baseball pitcher in the Colorado Rockies organization. He made his Major League Baseball (MLB) debut in 2026.

== Amateur career ==
Adams graduated from Har-Ber High School in Springdale, Arkansas in 2019. He played two years of college baseball at the University of Arkansas for the Arkansas Razorbacks and one year at Kansas State University where he played for Kansas State Wildcats.

== Professional career ==
The Colorado Rockies selected him in the 13th round, 386th overall, of the 2022 Major League Baseball draft. He made his professional debut with the rookie–level Arizona Complex League Rockies. Adams split the 2023 campaign between the Single–A Fresno Grizzlies and High–A Spokane Indians, accumulating a 1–5 record and 4.21 ERA with 86 strikeouts in 83 1/3 innings pitched across 16 starts.

Adams split the 2024 season between Spokane and the Double–A Hartford Yard Goats. In 23 appearances (including 22 starts) for the two affiliates, he posted a cumulative 9–5 record and 2.91 ERA with 125 strikeouts over 127 innings of work. Adams made 30 appearances (including 16 starts) for Hartford during the 2025 season, tallying a 6–7 record and 5.48 ERA with 86 strikeouts across 90 1/3 innings pitched.

Adams began the 2026 season with Hartford, and was promoted to the Triple–A Albuquerque Isotopes after eight starts; in his first 17 games for Albuquerque, he logged a 2–5 record and 8.10 ERA with 41 strikeouts. On August 24, 2026, Adams was selected to the 40–man roster and promoted to the major leagues for the first time. In his debut, he allowed five runs across one inning pitched against the Washington Nationals. On November 2, Adams was removed from the 40–man roster and sent outright to Triple–A Albuquerque.
