= Kyle Karros =

American baseball player (born 2002)

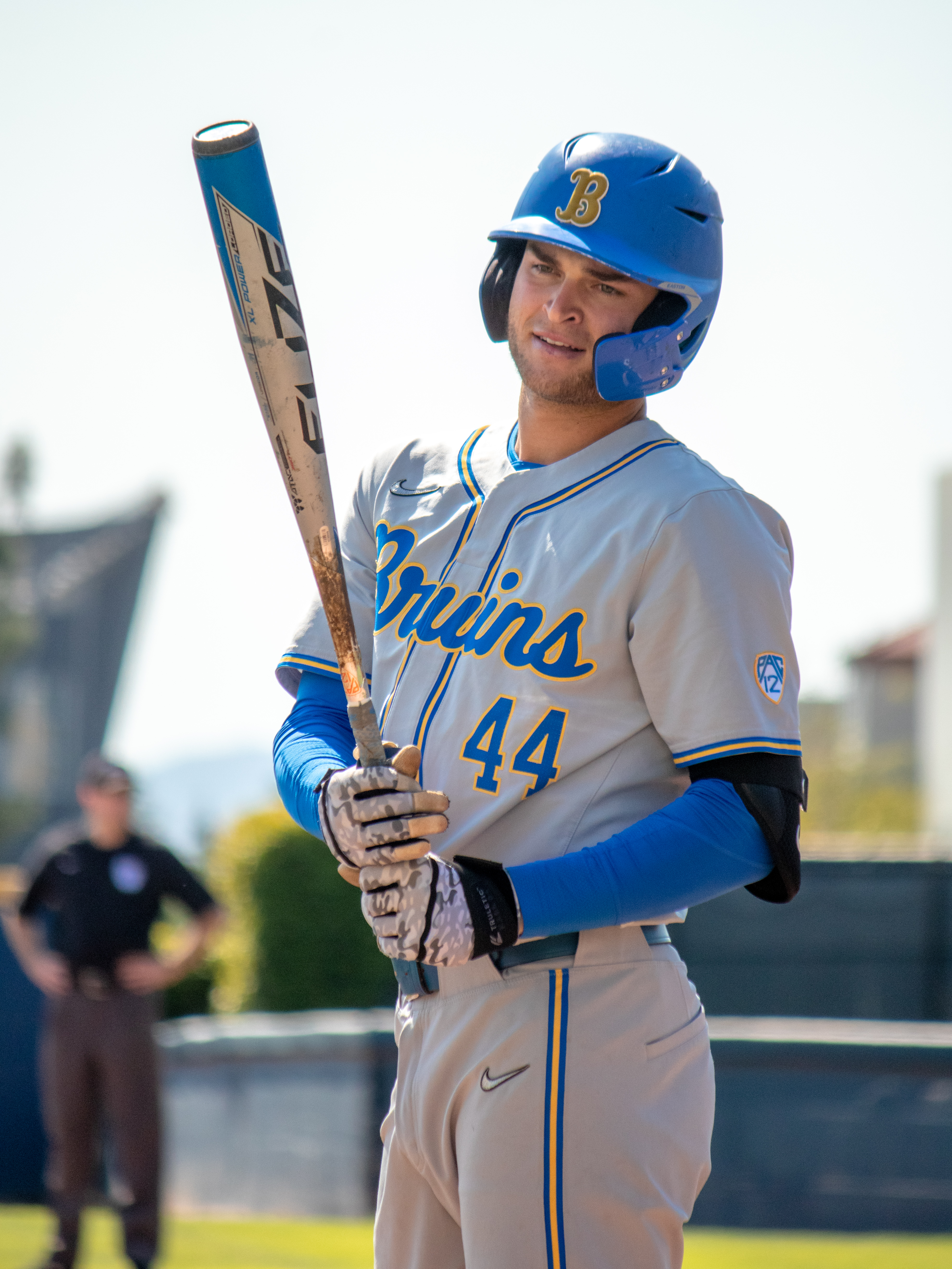
- Karros with UCLA in 2022

Colorado Rockies – No. 12
- Third baseman
- Born: July 26, 2002 (age 24); Los Angeles, California, U.S.
- Bats: Right Throws: Right

MLB debut
- August 8, 2025, for the Colorado Rockies

MLB statistics (through 2026 season)
- Batting average: .246
- Home runs: 14
- Runs batted in: 58
- Stats at Baseball Reference

Teams
- Colorado Rockies (2025–present)

Kyle Garret Karros (born July 26, 2002) is an American professional baseball third baseman for the Colorado Rockies of Major League Baseball (MLB). He made his MLB debut in 2025.

== Amateur career ==
Karros attended Mira Costa High School and played college baseball for the UCLA Bruins. In 2022, he played collegiate summer baseball with the Cotuit Kettleers of the Cape Cod Baseball League.

== Professional career ==
Karros was drafted by the Colorado Rockies in the fifth round, with the 145th overall selection, of the 2023 Major League Baseball draft.

Karros split his first professional season between the rookie-level Arizona Complex League Rockies and Single-A Fresno Grizzlies, hitting .285 with 17 runs batted in (RBI) in 36 games. He spent the entirety of the 2024 campaign with the High-A Spokane Indians, earning league MVP honors with a slashline of a .311/.390/.485 with 15 home runs, 78 RBI, and 12 stolen bases. Spokane would go on to win the league championship as well. To begin the 2025 season, Karros batted .301/.398/.476 with six home runs, 26 RBI, and seven stolen bases in 75 games split between the ACL Rockies, Double-A Hartford Yard Goats, and Triple-A Albuquerque Isotopes.

On August 8, 2025, Karros was selected to the 40-man roster and promoted to the major leagues with the Colorado Rockies. He singled and drove in a run in his first at-bat against the Arizona Diamondbacks. On August 19, Karros hit his first career home run off of Emmet Sheehan of the Los Angeles Dodgers. He finished his season with a slashline of .226/.308/.277 and one home run in 137 at-bats.

== Personal life ==
Karros' father, Eric, played in MLB from 1991 to 2004 for the Los Angeles Dodgers, Chicago Cubs, and Oakland Athletics. His brother Jared, a pitcher, was his teammate at UCLA, and was selected by the Dodgers in the 2022 MLB draft.

== See also ==
- List of second-generation Major League Baseball players
