= TJ Shook =

American baseball player (born 1998)

Colorado Rockies
- Pitcher
- Born: May 29, 1998 (age 28); Columbia, South Carolina, U.S.
- Bats: Right Throws: Right

MLB debut
- June 2, 2026, for the Colorado Rockies

MLB statistics (through 2026 season)
- Win–loss record: 0–0
- Earned run average: 8.22
- Strikeouts: 7
- Stats at Baseball Reference

Teams
- Colorado Rockies (2026)

Franklin Todd "TJ" Shook (born May 29, 1998) is an American professional baseball pitcher in the Colorado Rockies organization. He made his Major League Baseball (MLB) debut in 2026.

== Career ==
=== Amateur career ===
Shook attended Dutch Fork High School in Richland County, South Carolina. He enrolled at the University of South Carolina and played college baseball for the South Carolina Gamecocks.

=== Milwaukee Brewers ===
On July 24, 2020, Shook signed with the Milwaukee Brewers after going unselected in the 2020 MLB draft. He did not appear for the organization during the year due to the cancellation of the minor league season because of the COVID-19 pandemic. Shook made his professional debut in 2021, accumulating a 5-2 record and 4.96 ERA with 71 strikeouts across 13 starts split between the rookie-level Arizona Complex League Brewers, Single-A Carolina Mudcats, and High-A Wisconsin Timber Rattlers.

Shook made 25 appearances (including 21 starts) for Wisconsin and the Double-A Biloxi Shuckers during the 2022 campaign, accumulating a 6-3 record and 4.74 ERA with 118 strikeouts over 114 innings of work. He returned to Biloxi for the 2023 season, registering a 7-5 record and 4.62 ERA with 107 strikeouts across 25 games (12 starts).

Shook made 17 appearances (11 starts) for Biloxi in 2024, compiling a 5-7 record and 4.90 ERA with 77 strikeouts across 64 1/3 innings pitched.

=== New York Mets ===
On July 21, 2024, Shook was traded to the New York Mets in exchange for Tyler Jay. He made 13 appearances down the stretch for the Double-A Binghamton Rumble Ponies, posting a 3-4 record and 3.92 ERA with 30 strikeouts and four saves across 20 2/3 innings pitched.

Shook split the 2025 season between Binghamton and the Triple-A Syracuse Mets. In 36 appearances (including two starts) for the two affiliates, Shook logged a cumulative 6-2 record and 2.41 ERA with 61 strikeouts and eight saves over 56 innings of work.

=== Colorado Rockies ===
On December 10, 2025, the Colorado Rockies selected Shook from the Mets with the first overall selection in the minor league phase of the Rule 5 draft. He was assigned to the Triple-A Albuquerque Isotopes to begin the 2026 season.

On June 1, 2026, Shook was selected to the 40-man roster and promoted to the major leagues for the first time. He made his MLB debut the following day, tossing a scoreless inning against the Los Angeles Angels. Shook made five appearances for Colorado, recording an 8.22 ERA with seven strikeouts across 7 2/3 innings pitched. On November 2, he was removed from the 40–man roster and sent outright to Albuquerque.

On November 18, 2026, Shook re–signed with the Rockies on a minor league contract.

== See also ==
- Rule 5 draft results
