= Cole Carrigg =

American baseball player (born 2002)

Colorado Rockies – No. 16
- Outfielder
- Born: May 8, 2002 (age 24); Modesto, California, U.S.
- Bats: Switch Throws: Right

MLB debut
- June 9, 2026, for the Colorado Rockies

MLB statistics (through 2026 season)
- Batting average: .279
- Home runs: 12
- Runs batted in: 53
- Stats at Baseball Reference

Teams
- Colorado Rockies (2026–present)

Cole Michael Carrigg (born May 8, 2002) is an American professional baseball outfielder for the Colorado Rockies of Major League Baseball (MLB). He made his MLB debut in 2026.

== Amateur career ==
Carrigg attended Turlock High School in Turlock, California, and San Diego State University, where he played three years of college baseball for the San Diego State Aztecs. Carrigg finished the 2023 season batting .303 with two home runs and 17 stolen bases while playing in 42 games. During his college career, he was a utility player and made 53 starts in center field, 24 at shortstop, 21 at third base, 17 at second, five at catcher, five in left field and two at designated hitter. Carrigg finished his career at San Diego State with a .333 batting average, seven home runs, 34 doubles, 90 RBIs, 101 runs scored and 39 stolen bases. He was also named to the all-Mountain West Conference twice, once as an infielder in 2022 and another as a center fielder in 2023.

In 2022, Carrigg played collegiate summer baseball with the Yarmouth–Dennis Red Sox of the Cape Cod Baseball League, where he was named a league all-star and posted a .329 batting average with 15 stolen bases in 41 games.

== Professional career ==
The Colorado Rockies selected Carrigg as a catcher in the second round, with the 65th overall selection, of the 2023 Major League Baseball draft. On July 17, 2023, Carrigg signed with the Rockies for a $1.3 million signing bonus.

Carrigg made his professional debut after signing with the Rookie-level Arizona Complex League Rockies and was promoted the Single-A Fresno Grizzlies during the season. Across 36 games, he hit .350 with five home runs and 29 RBI. In 2024, he played for the High-A Spokane Indians and batted .280 with 16 home runs, 60 RBI, and 51 stolen bases across 111 games. Carrigg was assigned to the Double-A Hartford Yard Goats for the 2025 season with whom he hit .237 with 15 home runs, 64 RBI, and 46 stolen bases over 123 games. He was assigned to the Triple-A Albuquerque Isotopes to begin the 2026 season, where he slashed .338/.414/.529 with six home runs, 42 RBI, and 30 stolen bases across 57 games played.

On June 9, 2026, Carrigg was selected to the 40-man roster and promoted to the major leagues for the first time. He made his MLB debut that night at Coors Field against the Chicago Cubs and recorded his first MLB hit, a triple off Cubs starting pitcher Colin Rea. Two days later, Carrigg homered off Cubs starter Edward Cabrera for his first career home run. On September 15, he recorded his first multi-home run game against the San Diego Padres as part of a four–hit, five–RBI night. He was awarded Major League Baseball Rookie of the Month for September after hitting .327 with six home runs across 24 games. In total for the 2026 season, Carrigg played in 93 games for the Rockies and ended his rookie year with a .279 batting average, 12 home runs, and 53 RBI.

== International career ==
Carrigg played for Team Israel in the 2026 World Baseball Classic.

Achievements
Preceded by Sal Stewart	National League Rookie of the Month; September 2026	Most recent
