= Welinton Herrera =

Dominican baseball player (born 2004)

Colorado Rockies – No. 59
- Pitcher
- Born: April 3, 2004 (age 22); Fantino, Dominican Republic
- Bats: Left Throws: Left

MLB debut
- May 25, 2026, for the Colorado Rockies

MLB statistics (through 2026 season)
- Win–loss record: 0–0
- Earned run average: 0.00
- Strikeouts: 2
- Stats at Baseball Reference

Teams
- Colorado Rockies (2026–present)

Welinton Herrera (born April 3, 2004) is a Dominican professional baseball pitcher for the Colorado Rockies of Major League Baseball (MLB). He made his MLB debut in 2026.

== Career ==
On January 20, 2021, Herrera signed with the Colorado Rockies as an international free agent. He made his professional debut that year with the Dominican Summer League Rockies, registering a 2–0 record and 5.16 ERA with 28 strikeouts across 22 2/3 innings pitched. Herrera made 20 appearances (one start) for the DSL Rockies in 2022, posting a 5–1 record and 2.93 ERA with 54 strikeouts and two saves over 43 innings of work.

Herrera spent the 2023 campaign with the rookie-level Arizona Complex League Rockies, compiling a 2–0 record and 3.27 ERA with 36 strikeouts and one save across 21 appearances out of the bullpen. He split the 2024 season between the Single-A Fresno Grizzlies and High-A Spokane Indians, posting a combined 11–4 record and 3.47 ERA with 92 strikeouts across 62 1/3 innings pitched.

Herrera began the 2025 season with Spokane, recording an 0.49 ERA with 29 strikeouts and 10 saves over 15 games before he was promoted to the Double-A Hartford Yard Goats. On July 8, 2025, Herrera was selected to represent the Rockies organization at the All-Star Futures Game. He made 37 appearances for Hartford, compiling a 4–5 record and 3.50 ERA with 70 strikeouts and seven saves across 46 1/3 innings pitched. On November 18, the Rockies added Herrera to their 40-man roster to protect him from the Rule 5 draft.

Herrera was optioned to Triple-A Albuquerque to begin the 2026 season. On May 25, 2026, Herrera was promoted to the major leagues for the first time following an injury to José Quintana. He made three scoreless appearances for Colorado, recording two strikeouts in 2 1/3 innings pitched. On June 1, Herrera was diagnosed with a torn ulnar collateral ligament, ruling him out for the remainder of the season.
