= Sammy Peralta =

American baseball player (born 1998)

Los Angeles Angels
- Pitcher
- Born: May 10, 1998 (age 28); New York City, New York, U.S.
- Bats: Left Throws: Left

MLB debut
- May 4, 2023, for the Chicago White Sox

MLB statistics (through 2026 season)
- Win–loss record: 2–2
- Earned run average: 5.64
- Strikeouts: 60
- Stats at Baseball Reference

Teams
- Chicago White Sox (2023–2024); Los Angeles Angels (2025); Colorado Rockies (2026); Los Angeles Angels (2026)

Samuel Felipe Peralta (born May 10, 1998) is an American professional baseball pitcher in the Los Angeles Angels organization. He has previously played in Major League Baseball (MLB) for the Chicago White Sox and Colorado Rockies.

== Career ==
=== Chicago White Sox ===
Peralta was selected by the Chicago White Sox in the 18th round, with the 530th overall selection, of the 2019 Major League Baseball draft. He spent his first professional season split between the rookie-level Great Falls Voyagers and Arizona League White Sox, posting a cumulative 1.96 ERA with four saves across 18 appearances. Peralta did not play in a game in 2020 due to the cancellation of the minor league season because of the COVID-19 pandemic.

In 2021, Peralta split the season between the Single-A Kannapolis Cannon Ballers and the High-A Winston-Salem Dash, pitching in 31 games and registering a combined 3–1 record and 4.07 ERA with 68 strikeouts and two saves in 55 1/3 innings pitched. He split the 2022 season between the Double-A Birmingham Barons and Triple-A Charlotte Knights, recording a cumulative 4–4 record and 3.77 ERA with 76 strikeouts and 4 saves in 62.0 innings of work. He began the 2023 season with Charlotte, logging a 1–1 record and 3.52 ERA with 15 strikeouts across 8 contests.

On May 2, 2023, Peralta was selected to the 40-man roster and promoted to the major leagues for the first time. In 16 games for Chicago during his rookie campaign, he recorded a 4.05 ERA with 18 strikeouts across 20 innings pitched.

Peralta was optioned to Triple–A Charlotte to begin the 2024 season. However, following multiple roster moves on March 28, Peralta was designated for assignment by Chicago.

=== Seattle Mariners ===
On April 2, 2024, Peralta was claimed off waivers by the Seattle Mariners and optioned to the Triple-A Tacoma Rainiers. In 12 games for Tacoma, he struggled to a 9.24 ERA with 12 strikeouts across 12 2/3 innings pitched. On May 23, Peralta was designated for assignment by the Mariners.

=== Chicago White Sox (second stint) ===
On May 26, 2024, Peralta was claimed off waivers by the Chicago White Sox. He was designated for assignment without appearing for the organization on May 28. Peralta cleared waivers and was sent outright to the Triple–A Charlotte Knights on May 30. On June 9, the White Sox selected Peralta's contract, adding him to their active roster. While playing for Charlotte on June 16, Peralta was part of a seven–pitcher no-hitter against the Durham Bulls. On November 12, he was removed from the 40–man roster and sent outright to Charlotte, but he rejected the assignment and elected free agency.

=== El Águila de Veracruz ===
On April 2, 2025, Peralta signed with El Águila de Veracruz of the Mexican League. In four starts for Veracruz, Peralta logged a 2-1 record and 2.53 ERA with 22 strikeouts across 21 1/3 innings pitched.

=== Los Angeles Angels ===
On May 19, 2025, Peralta signed a minor league contract with the Los Angeles Angels. In 24 appearances (seven starts) for the Triple-A Salt Lake Bees, he logged a 6-2 record and 4.33 ERA with 70 strikeouts across 70 2/3 innings pitched. On September 7, the Angels selected Peralta's contract, adding him to their active roster. He made five appearances for Los Angeles, struggling to an 0-1 record and 7.59 ERA with eight strikeouts across 10 2/3 innings pitched.

=== Milwaukee Brewers ===
On October 21, 2025, Peralta was claimed off waivers by the Milwaukee Brewers. Peralta was optioned to the Triple-A Nashville Sounds to begin the 2026 season. He made two appearances for Nashville, allowing three runs on two hits with one strikeout across one inning pitched. On March 30, 2026, Peralta was designated for assignment by Milwaukee following the acquisition of Luis Matos.

=== Colorado Rockies ===
On April 4, 2026, Peralta was claimed off waivers by the Colorado Rockies. He made two appearances for Colorado, struggling to an 0-1 record and 10.13 ERA with four strikeouts across 2 2/3 innings pitched. Peralta was designated for assignment by the Rockies on June 21. He cleared waivers and was sent outright to the Triple-A Albuquerque Isotopes on June 25. However, the next day, Peralta rejected the assignment and elected free agency.

=== Los Angeles Angels (second stint) ===
On June 27, 2026, Peralta signed a minor league contract with the Los Angeles Angels. In 15 appearances for the Triple–A Salt Lake Bees, he struggled to a 9.37 ERA with 19 strikeouts across 16 1/3 innings pitched. On August 10, the Angels selected Peralta's contract, adding him to their active roster. He made 14 appearances for Los Angeles, struggling to a 6.20 ERA with 19 strikeouts across 20 1/3 innings pitched. On October 29, Peralta was removed from the 40–man roster and elected free agency.

On November 13, 2026, Peralta re-signed a minor league contract with the Angels.
