= Mark Manfredi =

American baseball player (born 2000)

Colorado Rockies – No. 54
- Pitcher
- Born: January 28, 2000 (age 26); Highland Heights, Ohio, U.S.
- Bats: Right Throws: Left

MLB debut
- August 19, 2026, for the Colorado Rockies

MLB statistics (through 2026 season)
- Win-loss record: 1–2
- Earned run average: 3.06
- Strikeouts: 16
- Stats at Baseball Reference

Teams
- Colorado Rockies (2026–present)

Mark Silvio Manfredi (born January 28, 2000) is an American professional baseball pitcher for the Colorado Rockies of Major League Baseball (MLB). He made his MLB debut in 2026.

== Amateur career ==
Manfredi graduated from Mayfield High School in Mayfield, Ohio. He enrolled at Sinclair Community College to play college baseball, and then transferred to the University of Dayton to continue his collegiate career with the Dayton Flyers in 2021. He tore the ulnar collateral ligament of the elbow and needed Tommy John surgery. After recovering, he had a 3-4 win-loss record and a 4.99 earned run average with 96 strikeouts as a senior. In 2023, he played collegiate summer baseball with the Wareham Gatemen of the Cape Cod Baseball League.

== Professional career ==
The Milwaukee Brewers selected Manfredi in the ninth round, with the 272nd overall selection, of the 2023 MLB draft.

On August 3, 2026, Manfredi and Juan Martinez were traded to the Colorado Rockies in exchange for Antonio Senzatela. He made four appearances for the Triple–A Albuquerque Isotopes, recording a 10.80 ERA with seven strikeouts over five innings of work. On August 19, Manfredi was selected to the 40–man roster and promoted to the major leagues for the first time. He made his debut that night against the Los Angeles Dodgers, pitching 1 1/3 innings without allowing a run.
