= Nick Frasso =

American baseball player (born 1998)

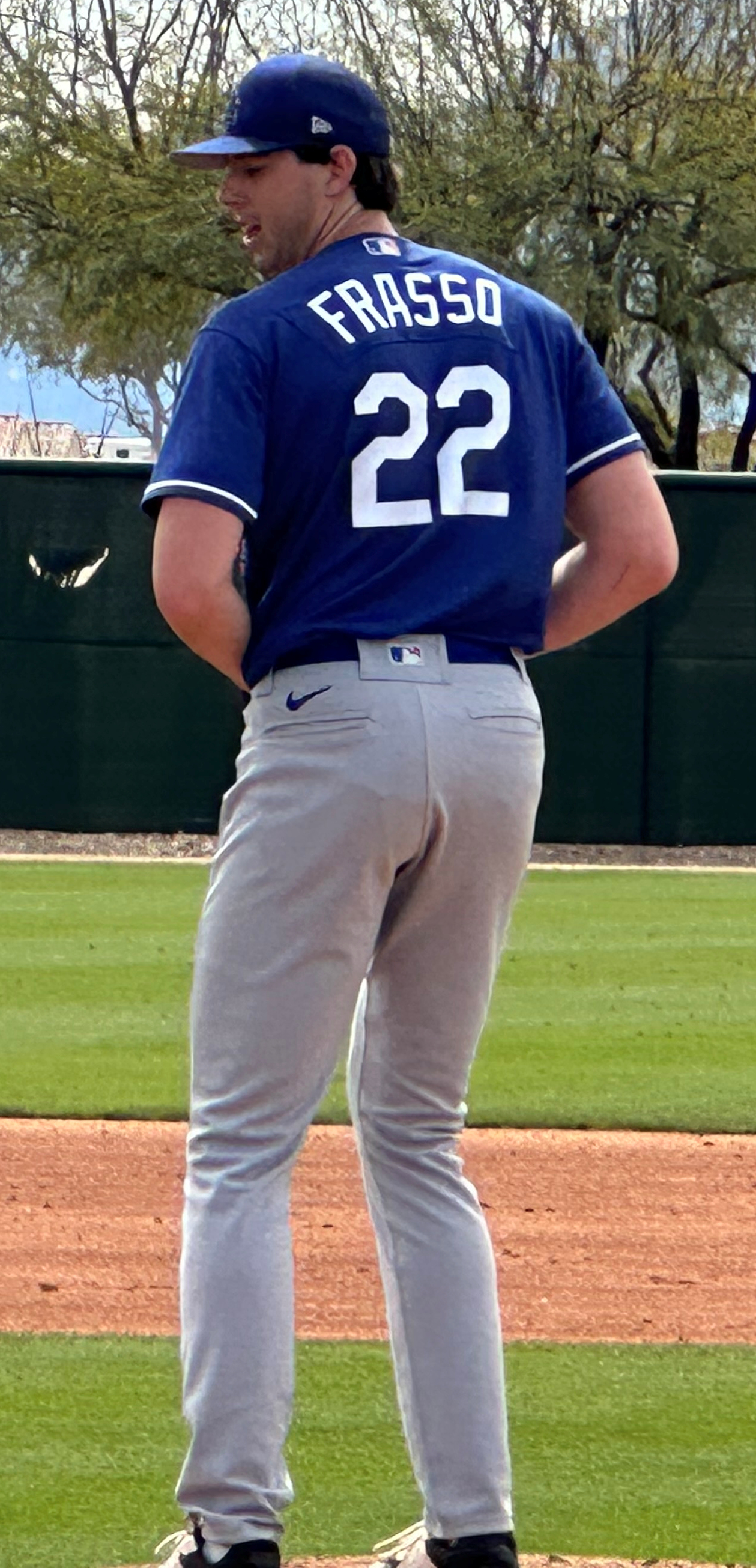
- Frasso with the Los Angeles Dodgers in 2023

Colorado Rockies – No. 41
- Pitcher
- Born: October 18, 1998 (age 28); Torrance, California, U.S.
- Bats: Right Throws: Right

MLB debut
- August 4, 2026, for the Colorado Rockies

MLB statistics (through 2026 season)
- Win–loss record: 1–1
- Earned run average: 5.82
- Strikeouts: 22
- Stats at Baseball Reference

Teams
- Colorado Rockies (2026–present)

Nicholas Paul Frasso (born October 18, 1998) is an American professional baseball pitcher for the Colorado Rockies of Major League Baseball (MLB). He debuted in MLB in 2026.

== Career ==
=== Amateur career ===
Frasso played college baseball for the Loyola Marymount Lions. He began his freshman season as a starter before being moved to the bullpen and was named to the West Coast Conference All-Freshman team. Frasso was named second team All-WCC as a sophomore after going 2–2 with 10 saves and a 2.22 ERA in 19 appearances. In 2019, he played collegiate summer baseball with the Orleans Firebirds of the Cape Cod Baseball League.

=== Toronto Blue Jays ===
Frasso was drafted by the Toronto Blue Jays in the fourth round of the 2020 Major League Baseball draft. He was assigned to the Low-A Dunedin Blue Jays in 2021, where he pitched in three games before suffering a partial tear in the ulnar collateral ligament in his pitching elbow. Frasso returned to Dunedin at the start of the 2022 season. Frasso had a 0.70 ERA with 48 strikeouts in 25 2/3 innings pitched at Dunedin before being promoted to the Vancouver Canadians of the High-A Northwest League.

=== Los Angeles Dodgers ===
On August 2, 2022, Frasso and Moises Brito were traded to the Los Angeles Dodgers in exchange for Mitch White and Alex De Jesus. The Dodgers assigned him to the Great Lakes Loons, where he allowed only one earned run in 5 2/3 innings the rest of the season. In 2023 he made 21 starts for the Double-A Tulsa Drillers and four for the Triple-A Oklahoma City Dodgers, pitching to a combined 4–6 with a 3.77 ERA and 107 strikeouts in 93 innings.

On November 14, 2023, the Dodgers added Frasso to their 40-man roster to protect him from the Rule 5 draft. He underwent labrum surgery in November 2023, necessitating a year long recovery and causing him to miss the entirety of the 2024 campaign.

Frasso started on Opening Day for Oklahoma City in 2025, his first game action in over a year. After beginning the season in the rotation and struggling, Frasso was moved to the bullpen. He pitched in 43 games, with a 6–1 record and 5.49 ERA with 68 strikeouts. On September 26, 2025, Frasso was placed on the 60-day injured list due to an undisclosed injury, ending his season. On November 21, he was non-tendered and became a free agent.

The Dodgers re-signed Frasso to a minor league contract on December 13, 2025. He returned to Triple-A Oklahoma City to begin the 2026 season. On June 6, Frasso was selected back to the 40-man roster but remained with Oklahoma City. In 21 games, he had a 4.74 ERA in 24 2/3 innings.

=== Colorado Rockies ===
On July 20, 2026, Frasso (along with Landyn Vidourek) was traded to the Colorado Rockies in exchange for Seth Halvorsen. On August 16, Frasso recorded his first career win after tossing a scoreless inning of relief against the San Francisco Giants.
