= Eiberson Castellano =

Venezuelan baseball player (born 2001)

Free agent
- Pitcher
- Born: May 9, 2001 (age 25); Maracaibo, Venezuela
- Bats: Right Throws: Right

MLB debut
- June 14, 2026, for the Colorado Rockies

MLB statistics (through 2026 season)
- Win–loss record: 0–0
- Earned run average: 0.00
- Strikeouts: 2
- Stats at Baseball Reference

Teams
- Colorado Rockies (2026)

Eiberson José Castellano (born May 9, 2001) is a Venezuelan professional baseball pitcher who is a free agent. He made his Major League Baseball (MLB) debut in 2026 for the Colorado Rockies.

== Professional career ==
=== Philadelphia Phillies ===
Castellano signed with the Philadelphia Phillies as an international free agent on July 2, 2018. He did not pitch at all during the 2019 season, then was unable to pitch in 2020 due to the cancellation of the minor league season because of the COVID-19 pandemic. Castellano finally made his professional debut with the Aguilas del Zulia of the Venezuelan Professional Baseball League later that year. Castellano made his affiliated debut in 2021 with the Dominican Summer League Phillies White, posting a 1.09 ERA in 33 innings of work. He was promoted to the Clearwater Threshers of the Single-A Florida State League for the 2022 season, where he would record a 3.51 ERA in 51 1/3 innings of work. Returning to Clearwater for the 2023 season, Castellano's results backed up, with his ERA ballooning to 5.04 in 50 innings of work.

Castellano began the 2024 season with the High-A Jersey Shore BlueClaws of the South Atlantic League before being promoted to the Reading Fightin Phils of the Double-A Eastern League in July. It would be a breakout season for him, as he'd work to a 3.99 ERA over 22 appearances between both levels, while also being the system's Minor League Pitcher of the Month for July. For his efforts, he'd be named the pitching winner of the Paul Owens Award for the 2024 season.

On December 11, 2024, Castellano was selected by the Minnesota Twins ninth overall in the Rule 5 draft. On March 25, 2025, Castellano was returned to the Phillies organization. He made 21 appearances split between Jersey Shore and Reading, posting a 4–3 record and 6.44 ERA with 39 strikeouts across 36 1/3 innings pitched. Castellano elected free agency following the season on November 6.

=== Colorado Rockies ===
On December 5, 2025, Castellano signed a minor league contract with the Colorado Rockies. He began the 2026 season with the Double-A Hartford Yard Goats, recording a 2.72 ERA across 10 starts before being promoted to the Triple-A Albuquerque Isotopes. On June 13, 2026, Castellano was promoted to the major leagues for the first time. He made his MLB debut the following day against the Athletics, recording his first career save after tossing three scoreless innings of relief. On November 2, Castellano was removed from the 40–man roster and sent outright to Albuquerque.

== See also ==
- Rule 5 draft results
