= Sterlin Thompson =

American baseball player (born 2001)

Colorado Rockies – No. 30
- Outfielder
- Born: June 26, 2001 (age 25); Longmont, Colorado, U.S.
- Bats: Left Throws: Right

MLB debut
- May 15, 2026, for the Colorado Rockies

MLB statistics (through 2026 season)
- Batting average: .232
- Home runs: 2
- Runs batted in: 10
- Stats at Baseball Reference

Teams
- Colorado Rockies (2026–present)

Sterlin Shaw Thompson (born June 26, 2001) is an American professional baseball outfielder for the Colorado Rockies of Major League Baseball (MLB). He debuted in MLB in 2026.

== Early life and amateur career ==
Thompson grew up in Ocala, Florida and initially attended Forest High School. He transferred to North Marion High School during his senior year and batted .357 with 70 hits, 58 runs scored, and 35 RBIs. Thompson was rated the ninth-best shortstop in his class nationally by Perfect Game and initially committed to play at Stetson. He later decommitted and signed to play at the University of Florida for the Florida Gators over offers from Mississippi State, LSU, and Kentucky. Thompson played summer collegiate baseball after graduating high school for the Orlando Scorpions of the Florida Collegiate Summer League (FCSL).

Thompson was moved to the outfield and became a starter for Florida during his freshman season. He was named to the Southeastern Conference (SEC) All-Freshman team after batting .301 with five home runs, three triples, 10 doubles, 39 runs scored, and 27 RBIs over 55 games. After the season Thompson returned to the FCSL and played for the Winter Park Diamond Dawgs, where he batted .391 and was named a league All-Star. As a sophomore for Florida in 2022, Thompson played in 66 games and hit .354 with 11 home runs and 51 RBIs.

== Professional career ==
The Colorado Rockies selected Thompson in the first compensatory round with 31st overall pick of the 2022 Major League Baseball draft. He signed with the team on July 29, 2022, and received a $2,430,500 signing bonus.

Thompson made his professional debut after signing with the Arizona Complex League Rockies and also played with the Fresno Grizzlies, hitting .307 with two home runs over 26 games between both teams. He opened the 2023 season with the Spokane Indians and was promoted to the Hartford Yard Goats during the season. Over 94 games between the two clubs, he hit .293 with 14 home runs, 56 RBI, and 17 stolen bases. Thompson played the 2024 season with Hartford and batted .245 with 13 home runs and 57 RBI over 119 games.

Thompson was assigned to the Triple-A Albuquerque Isotopes to open the 2025 season. He made 120 appearances for the Isotopes, slashing .296/.392/.519 with 18 home runs, 66 RBI, and 12 stolen bases. On November 18, 2025, the Rockies added Thompson to their 40-man roster to protect him from the Rule 5 draft.

Thompson was optioned to Triple-A Albuquerque to begin the 2026 season. On May 29, 2026, Thompson was promoted to the major leagues for the first time. On June 17, Thompson hit his first two major league home runs off of Javier Assad of the Chicago Cubs.
