= 2024 Colorado Rockies season =

2024 Colorado Rockies
- League: National League
- Division: West
- Ballpark: Coors Field
- City: Denver, Colorado
- Record: 61–101 (.377)
- Divisional place: 5th
- Owners: Charles & Richard Monfort
- General manager: Bill Schmidt
- Manager: Bud Black
- Television: MLB.tv
- Radio: KOA (English); KNRV (Spanish)
- Stats: ESPN.com; Baseball Reference

The 2024 Colorado Rockies season was their 32nd in Major League Baseball and 30th season at Coors Field. Manager Bud Black returned for his eighth season. By the All-Star break, the Rockies lost eight games when leading in the ninth inning.

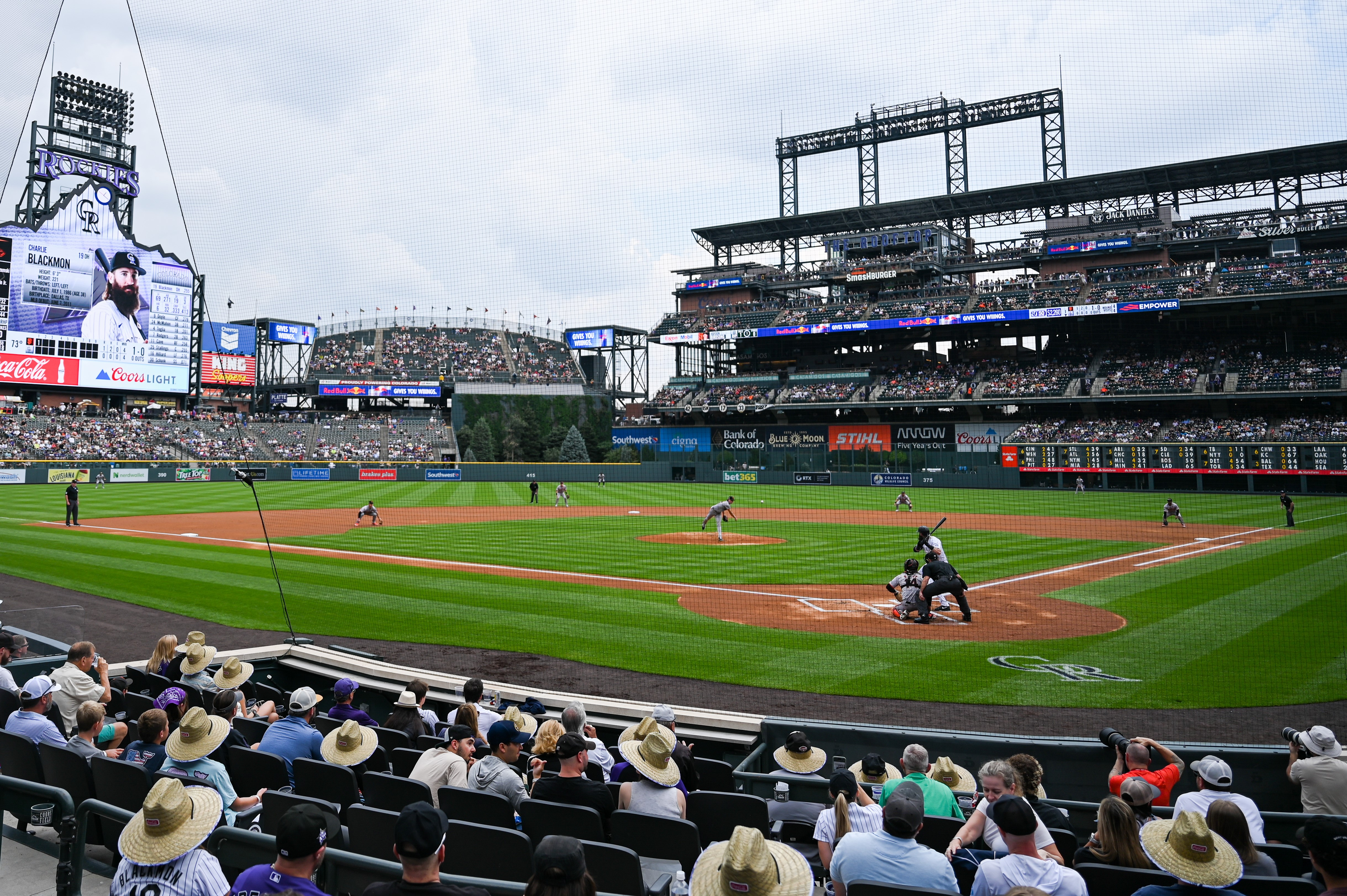
Coors Field in July 2024

The Rockies finished the season in last place in the National League West for the third consecutive season with a record of 61-101 (.377). It was their sixth straight losing season dating back to the 2019 season and their second straight season with over 100 losses, though it was a slight improvement from the previous season.

== Offseason ==
The Colorado Rockies finished the 2023 season 59–103, their worst record in franchise history to date and the third worst in the majors.

=== Roster departures ===
On October 13, 2023, the Rockies sent RHP Matt Carasiti, UT Harold Castro, and C Austin Wynns outright to AAA Albuquerque. All three rejected the assignment and became free agents. On October 18, the Rockies sent LHP Ty Blach, RHP Karl Kauffmann, and RHP Matt Koch outright to AAA Albuquerque. Blach and Koch rejected the assignment and became free agents. On October 20, the Rockies activated LHP Ryan Rolison from the 60-day IL, and sent him outright to AAA Albuquerque.

On November 2, RHP Chase Anderson, RHP Chris Flexen, and LHP Brent Suter declared free agency.

On December 6, the Rockies released RHP Connor Seabold.

On January 5, 2024, the Rockies waived C Brian Serven, who was claimed by the Chicago Cubs and outrighted INF Alan Trejo to AAA Albuquerque.

OF Sam Hilliard was waived on March 21, to make room on the 40-man roster following a trade.

INF Warming Bernabel was designated for assignment on March 28, when non-roster invitee INF Alan Trejo was announced to have made the Opening Day Roster.

=== Roster additions ===
On November 6, 2023, the Rockies claimed LHP Jalen Beeks off waivers from the Tampa Bay Rays.

On November 14, the Rockies added minor league INF Adael Amador, RHP Angel Chivilli, OF Yanquiel Fernández, and RHP Juan Mejía to the 40-man roster.

On December 6, the Rockies selected Anthony Molina from the Tampa Bay Rays in the Rule 5 draft.

On February 28, 2024, the Rockies claimed OF Sam Hilliard off waivers from the Baltimore Orioles.

==== Free agent signings ====
On November 13, 2023, the Rockies signed RHP Geoff Hartlieb to a minor-league contract.

The Rockies signed RHP Matt Koch to a minor-league contract with an invite to Spring Training on December 6. The Rockies signed RHP Chance Adams to a minor-league contract with an invite to Spring Training on December 18, 2023. On December 21, the Rockies signed LHP Ty Blach to a minor-league contract with an invitation to Spring Training.

On January 5, 2024, the Rockies signed RHP Dakota Hudson and C Jacob Stallings to 1-year contracts. The Rockies signed RHP John Curtiss to a minor-league contract with an invitation to spring training on January 25, 2024. LHP Josh Rogers was re-signed to a minor-league contract on January 27, 2024.

On February 6, 2024, the Rockies signed OF Bradley Zimmer to a minor-league contract with an invitation to spring training.

=== Trades ===
On November 17, 2023 the Rockies traded minor league C Kody Huff to the Cleveland Guardians for RHP Cal Quantrill. To make room on the 40-man roster, RHP Tommy Doyle was designated for assignment.

On March 21, 2024 the Rockies traded minor league LHP Joe Rock to the Tampa Bay Rays for minor league INF/OF Greg Jones.

On March 24, 2024 the Rockies acquired 1B/OF Jake Cave from the Philadelphia Phillies in exchange for cash considerations.

Off-season 40-man roster moves

Departing Player	Date	Transaction	New Team	Arriving player	Old team	Date	Transaction
Matt Carasiti	October 13, 2023	Outrighted	Colorado Rockies	Jalen Beeks	Tampa Bay Rays	November 6, 2023	Waivers
Harold Castro	October 13, 2023	Outrighted	Toros de Tijuana	Adael Amador	Hartford Yard Goats	November 14, 2023	Added to 40-man roster
Austin Wynns	October 13, 2023	Outrighted	Cincinnati Reds	Angel Chivilli	Hartford Yard Goats	November 14, 2023	Added to 40-man roster
Ty Blach	October 18, 2023	Outrighted	Colorado Rockies	Yanquiel Fernández	Hartford Yard Goats	November 14, 2023	Added to 40-man roster
Karl Kauffmann	October 18, 2023	Outrighted	Albuquerque Isotopes	Juan Mejia	Hartford Yard Goats	November 14, 2023	Added to 40-man roster
Matt Koch	October 18, 2023	Outrighted	Colorado Rockies	Cal Quantrill	Cleveland Guardians	November 17, 2023	Trade
Ryan Rolison	October 20, 2023	Outrighted	Albuquerque Isotopes	Anthony Molina	Tampa Bay Rays	December 6, 2023	Rule 5 Draft
Chase Anderson	November 2, 2023	Free Agency	Pittsburgh Pirates	Dakota Hudson	St. Louis Cardinals	January 5, 2024	Free Agency
Chris Flexen	November 2, 2023	Free Agency	Chicago White Sox	Jacob Stallings	Miami Marlins	January 5, 2024	Free Agency
Brent Suter	November 2, 2023	Free Agency	Cincinnati Reds	Sam Hilliard	Baltimore Orioles	February 28, 2024	Waivers
Tommy Doyle	November 17, 2023	DFA	Atlanta Braves	Greg Jones	Tampa Bay Rays	March 21, 2024	Trade
Connor Seabold	December 6, 2023	Released	Samsung Lions (KBO)	Jake Cave	Philadelphia Phillies	March 24, 2024	Trade
Alan Trejo	January 5, 2024	Outrighted	Albuquerque Isotopes	Alan Trejo	Albuquerque Isotopes	March 28, 2024	Contract Selected
Brian Serven	January 5, 2024	Waived	Chicago Cubs				
Sam Hilliard	March 21, 2024	DFA	Albuquerque Isotopes				
Warming Bernabel	March 28, 2024	DFA	Hartford Yard Goats				

== Preseason ==
On February 1, 2024 the Rockies announced 26 non-roster invitees to preseason.

Pre-Season non-roster invitees

Player	Position	2023 team(s)
Chance Adams	Pitcher	Albuquerque Isotopes
Jordan Beck	Outfielder	Hartford Yard Goats / Spokane Indians
Ty Blach	Pitcher	Colorado Rockies / Albuquerque Isotopes
Matt Carasiti	Pitcher	Colorado Rockies / Albuquerque Isotopes / ACL Rockies
Jeff Criswell	Pitcher	Albuquerque Isotopes
John Curtiss	Pitcher	New York Mets / Syracuse Mets
Braxton Fulford	Catcher	Albuquerque Isotopes / Hartford Yard Goats / Spokane Indians / ACL Rockies
Geoff Hartlieb	Pitcher	Miami Marlins / Jacksonville Jumbo Shrimp
Jaden Hill	Pitcher	Spokane Indians
Connor Kaiser	Infielder	Colorado Rockies / Albuquerque Isotopes
Karl Kauffmann	Pitcher	Colorado Rockies / Albuquerque Isotopes
Matt Koch	Pitcher	Colorado Rockies / Albuquerque Isotopes
Grant Lavigne	Infielder	Hartford Yard Goats
Willie MacIver	Catcher	Albuquerque Isotopes / ACL Rockies
Coco Montes	Infielder	Colorado Rockies / Albuquerque Isotopes
Benny Montgomery	Outfielder	Spokane Indians
Carson Palmquist	Pitcher	Hartford Yard Goats / Spokane Indians
Bladimir Restituyo	Outfielder	Hartford Yard Goats
Ryan Ritter	Infielder	Hartford Yard Goats / Spokane Indians / Fresno Grizzlies
Joe Rock	Pitcher	Albuquerque Isotopes / Hartford Yard Goats
Drew Romo	Catcher	Albuquerque Isotopes / Hartford Yard Goats
Aaron Schunk	Infielder	Albuquerque Isotopes
Sterlin Thompson	Infielder	Hartford Yard Goats / Spokane Indians
Alan Trejo	Infielder	Colorado Rockies / Albuquerque Isotopes
Zac Veen	Outfielder	Hartford Yard Goats
Kyle Wilcox	Pitcher	Gwinnett Stripers / Mississippi Braves
Bradley Zimmer	Outfielder	Oklahoma City Dodgers / Worcester Red Sox / FCL Red Sox

== Schedule ==
=== Game log ===
Legend
	Rockies win
	Rockies loss
	Postponement
	Eliminated from playoff race
**Bold**	Rockies team member

2024 Game Log: 61–101 (Home 37–44, Road 24–57)
March/April: 7–22 (Home 5–10, Road 2–12)

#	Date	Opponent	Score	Decision	Attendance	Record	Streak
1	March 28	@ Diamondbacks	1–16	**Kyle Freeland** (0–1)	49,011	0–1	L1
2	March 29	@ Diamondbacks	3–7	**Cal Quantrill** (0–1)	29,480	0–2	L2
3	March 30	@ Diamondbacks	9–4	**Peter Lambert** (1–0)	32,133	1–2	W1
4	March 31	@ Diamondbacks	1–5	**Ryan Feltner** (0–1)	21,824	1–3	L1
5	April 1	@ Cubs	0–5	**Dakota Hudson** (0–1)	40,072	1–4	L2
6	April 2	@ Cubs	2–12	**Kyle Freeland** (0–2)	26,555	1–5	L3
7	April 3	@ Cubs	8–9	**Nick Mears** (0–1)	25,900	1–6	L4
8	April 5	Rays	10–7	**Jalen Beeks** (1–0)	48,399	2–6	W1
9	April 6	Rays	6–8	**Jalen Beeks** (1–1)	29,238	2–7	L1
10	April 7	Rays	2–3	**Dakota Hudson** (0–2)	25,566	2–8	L2
11	April 8	Diamondbacks	7–5	**Peter Lambert** (2–0)	18,870	3–8	W1
12	April 9	Diamondbacks	2–3	**Cal Quantrill** (0–2)	19,359	3–9	L1
13	April 10	Diamondbacks	3–5	**Justin Lawrence** (0–1)	18,311	3–10	L2
14	April 12	@ Blue Jays	12–4	**Ryan Feltner** (1–1)	29,035	4–10	W1
15	April 13	@ Blue Jays	3–5	**Dakota Hudson** (0–3)	31,472	4–11	L1
16	April 14	@ Blue Jays	0–5	**Kyle Freeland** (0–3)	27,481	4–12	L2
17	April 15	@ Phillies	1–2 (10)	**Jake Bird** (0–1)	35,496	4–13	L3
18	April 16	@ Phillies	0–5	**Austin Gomber** (0-1)	35,010	4–14	L4
19	April 17	@ Phillies	6–7	**Ryan Feltner** (1–2)	35,706	4–15	L5
—	April 19	Mariners	Postponed (inclement weather); Makeup: April 21				
20	April 20	Mariners	0–7	**Dakota Hudson** (0–4)	25,376	4–16	L6
21	April 21 (1)	Mariners	2–1 (10)	**Justin Lawrence** (1–1)	33,283	5–16	W1
22	April 21 (2)	Mariners	2–10	**Peter Lambert** (2–1)	19,756	5–17	L1
23	April 22	Padres	1–3	**Nick Mears** (0–2)	18,515	5–18	L2
24	April 23	Padres	7–4	**Jalen Beeks** (2–1)	18,822	6–18	W1
25	April 24	Padres	2–5	**Ty Blach** (0–1)	19,356	6–19	L1
26	April 25	Padres	10–9	**Tyler Kinley** (1–0)	27,705	7–19	W1
27	April 27*	Astros	4–12	**Cal Quantrill** (0–3)	19,934	7–20	L1
28	April 28*	Astros	2–8	**Austin Gomber** (0–2)	19,841	7–21	L2
29	April 30	@ Marlins	6–7 (10)	**Jalen Beeks** (2–2)	6,706	7–22	L3
*April 27 and 28 games played at Estadio Alfredo Harp Helú in Mexico City, Mexico

May: 14–13 (Home 8–4, Road 6–9)

#	Date	Opponent	Score	Decision	Attendance	Record	Streak
30	May 1	@ Marlins	1–4	**Dakota Hudson** (0–5)	7,171	7–23	L4
31	May 2	@ Marlins	4–5 (10)	**Justin Lawrence** (1–2)	7,540	7–24	L5
32	May 3	@ Pirates	3–2	**Cal Quantrill** (1–3)	20,646	8–24	W1
33	May 4	@ Pirates	0–1	**Nick Mears** (0–3)	24,149	8–25	L1
34	May 5	@ Pirates	3–5	**Ryan Feltner** (1–3)	12,912	8–26	L2
35	May 7	Giants	0–5	**Dakota Hudson** (0–6)	21,259	8–27	L3
36	May 8	Giants	6–8	**Peter Lambert** (2–2)	20,532	8–28	L4
37	May 9	Giants	9–1	**Cal Quantrill** (2–3)	23,870	9–28	W1
38	May 10	Rangers	4–2	**Jake Bird** (1–1)	32,692	10-28	W2
39	May 11	Rangers	8–3	**Tyler Kinley** (2–0)	37,527	11–28	W3
40	May 12	Rangers	3–1	**Ty Blach** (1–1)	35,207	12–28	W4
41	May 13	@ Padres	5–4	**Dakota Hudson** (1–6)	34,458	13–28	W5
42	May 14	@ Padres	6–3	**Cal Quantrill** (3–3)	40,134	14–28	W6
43	May 15	@ Padres	8–0	**Austin Gomber** (1–2)	33,951	15–28	W7
44	May 17	@ Giants	5–10	**Ryan Feltner** (1–4)	32,025	15–29	L1
45	May 18	@ Giants	4–14	**Ty Blach** (1–2)	31,098	15–30	L2
46	May 19	@ Giants	1–4	**Dakota Hudson** (1–7)	34,766	15–31	L3
47	May 21	@ Athletics	4–5	**Tyler Kinley** (2–1)	4,005	15–32	L4
48	May 22	@ Athletics	4–3 (12)	**Nick Mears** (1–3)	3,617	16–32	W1
49	May 23	@ Athletics	9–10 (11)	**Peter Lambert** (2–3)	6,886	16–33	L1
50	May 24	Phillies	3–2 (11)	**Tyler Kinley** (3–1)	35,007	17–33	W1
51	May 25	Phillies	4–8	**Justin Lawrence** (1–3)	37,535	17–34	L1
52	May 26	Phillies	5–2	**Cal Quantrill** (4–3)	47,442	18–34	W1
53	May 27	Guardians	8–6	**Josh Rogers** (1–0)	35,122	19–34	W2
54	May 28	Guardians	7–13	**Peter Lambert** (2–4)	21,009	19–35	L1
55	May 29	Guardians	7–4	**Ty Blach** (2–2)	21,374	20–35	W1
56	May 31	@ Dodgers	4–1	**Dakota Hudson** (2–7)	47,542	21–35	W2

June: 7–20 (Home 3–10, Road 4–10)

#	Date	Opponent	Score	Decision	Attendance	Record	Streak
57	June 1	@ Dodgers	1–4	**Cal Quantrill** (4–4)	50,182	21–36	L1
58	June 2	@ Dodgers	0–4	**Austin Gomber** (1–3)	48,251	21–37	L2
59	June 3	Reds	3–13	**Ryan Feltner** (1–5)	25,140	21–38	L3
60	June 4	Reds	1–4	**Ty Blach** (2–3)	25,315	21–39	L4
61	June 5	Reds	7–12	**Jalen Beeks** (2–3)	27,022	21–40	L5
62	June 6	@ Cardinals	3–2	**Cal Quantrill** (5–4)	33,332	22–40	W1
63	June 7	@ Cardinals	5–8	**Matt Carasiti** (0–1)	35,229	22–41	L1
64	June 8	@ Cardinals	6–5	**Victor Vodnik** (1–0)	34,577	23–41	W1
65	June 9	@ Cardinals	1–5	**Ty Blach** (2–4)	40,219	23–42	L1
66	June 10	@ Twins	0–5	**Dakota Hudson** (2–8)	19,901	23–43	L2
67	June 11	@ Twins	5–4	**Cal Quantrill** (6–4)	21,998	24–43	W1
68	June 12	@ Twins	9–17	**Austin Gomber** (1–4)	18,875	24–44	L1
69	June 14	Pirates	2–5	**Ryan Feltner** (1–6)	31,717	24–45	L2
70	June 15	Pirates	16–4	**Ty Blach** (3–4)	40,033	25–45	W1
71	June 16	Pirates	2–8	**Dakota Hudson** (2–9)	40,422	25–46	L1
72	June 17	Dodgers	5–9	**Cal Quantrill** (6–5)	32,021	25–47	L2
73	June 18	Dodgers	9–11	**Victor Vodnik** (1–1)	33,791	25–48	L3
74	June 19	Dodgers	7–6	**Jalen Beeks** (3–3)	37,503	26–48	W1
75	June 20	Dodgers	3–5	**Ty Blach** (3–5)	40,236	26–49	L1
76	June 21	Nationals	5–11	**Dakota Hudson** (2–10)	31,935	26–50	L2
77	June 22	Nationals	8–7	**Jalen Beeks** (4–3)	34,509	27–50	W1
78	June 23	Nationals	1–2	**Jalen Beeks** (4–4)	30,407	27–51	L1
79	June 25	@ Astros	2–5	**Austin Gomber** (1–5)	35,976	27–52	L2
80	June 26	@ Astros	1–7	**Ryan Feltner** (1–7)	33,603	27–53	L3
81	June 28	@ White Sox	3–5	**Dakota Hudson** (2–11)	24,422	27–54	L4
82	June 29	@ White Sox	3–11	**Cal Quantrill** (6–6)	21,940	27–55	L5
83	June 30	@ White Sox	5–4 (14)	**Jalen Beeks** (5–4)	19,334	28–55	W1

July: 11–15 (Home 8–5, Road 3–10)

#	Date	Opponent	Score	Decision	Attendance	Record	Streak
84	July 1	Brewers	8–7 (10)	**Tyler Kinley** (4–1)	26,204	29–55	W2
85	July 2	Brewers	3–4	**Nick Mears** (1–4)	25,669	29–56	L1
86	July 3	Brewers	0–3	**Dakota Hudson** (2–12)	34,117	29–57	L2
87	July 4	Brewers	4–3	**Anthony Molina** (1–0)	48,705	30–57	W1
88	July 5	Royals	4–2	**Victor Vodnik** (2–1)	48,321	31–57	W2
89	July 6	Royals	3–1	**Austin Gomber** (2–5)	33,748	32–57	W3
90	July 7	Royals	1–10	**Tanner Gordon** (0–1)	32,180	32–58	L1
91	July 8	@ Reds	0–6	**Ryan Feltner** (1–8)	15,873	32–59	L2
92	July 9	@ Reds	6–12	**Cal Quantrill** (6–7)	17,542	32–60	L3
93	July 10	@ Reds	6–5	**Kyle Freeland** (1–3)	16,836	33–60	W1
94	July 11	@ Reds	1–8	**Austin Gomber** (2–6)	20,762	33–61	L1
95	July 12	@ Mets	6–7	**Tanner Gordon** (0–2)	28,852	33–62	L2
96	July 13	@ Mets	3–7	**Ryan Feltner** (1–9)	31,029	33–63	L3
97	July 14	@ Mets	8–5	**Justin Lawrence** (2–3)	24,970	34–63	W1
**94th All-Star Game in Arlington, TX**
98	July 19	Giants	7–3	**Jalen Beeks** (6–4)	40,115	35–63	W2
99	July 20	Giants	4–3	**Kyle Freeland** (2–3)	44,178	36–63	W3
100	July 21	Giants	2–3	**Ryan Feltner** (1–10)	30,507	36–64	L1
101	July 22	Red Sox	9–8 (12)	**Justin Lawrence** (3–3)	35,261	37–64	W1
102	July 23	Red Sox	0–6	**Ty Blach** (3–6)	36,553	37–65	L1
103	July 24	Red Sox	20–7	**Cal Quantrill** (7–7)	36,579	38–65	W1
104	July 26	@ Giants	4–11	**Kyle Freeland** (2–4)	32,861	38–66	L1
105	July 27 (1)	@ Giants	1–4	**Justin Lawrence** (3–4)	see 2nd game	38–67	L2
106	July 27 (2)	@ Giants	0–5	**Tanner Gordon** (0–3)	34,543	38–68	L3
107	July 28	@ Giants	4–5	**Austin Gomber** (2–7)	37,178	38–69	L4
108	July 30	@ Angels	7–10	**Jake Bird** (1–2)	25,241	38–70	L5
109	July 31	@ Angels	2–1	**Kyle Freeland** (3–4)	23,658	39–70	W1

August: 12–16 (Home 8–7, Road 4–9)

#	Date	Opponent	Score	Decision	Attendance	Record	Streak
110	August 1	@ Angels	5–4 (10)	**Victor Vodnik** (3–1)	27,335	40–70	W2
111	August 2	@ Padres	5–2	**Austin Gomber** (3–7)	44,393	41–70	W3
112	August 3	@ Padres	2–3	**Peter Lambert** (2–5)	44,029	41–71	L1
113	August 4	@ Padres	2–10	**Cal Quantrill** (7–8)	41,828	41–72	L2
114	August 6	Mets	6–3	**Justin Lawrence** (4–4)	30,392	42–72	W1
115	August 7	Mets	3–5	**Victor Vodnik** (3–2)	30,673	42–73	L1
116	August 8	Mets	1–9	**Austin Gomber** (3–8)	26,379	42–74	L2
117	August 9	Braves	6–5	**Tyler Kinley** (5–1)	33,028	43–74	W1
118	August 10	Braves	8–11	**Angel Chivilli** (0–1)	46,169	43–75	L1
119	August 11	Braves	9–8	**Josh Rogers** (2–0)	40,365	44–75	W1
120	August 12	@ Diamondbacks	4–5	**Anthony Molina** (1–1)	15,525	44–76	L1
121	August 13	@ Diamondbacks	3–4	**Victor Vodnik** (3–3)	19,731	44–77	L2
122	August 14	@ Diamondbacks	4–11	**Tanner Gordon** (0–4)	16,464	44–78	L3
123	August 16	Padres	7–3	**Cal Quantrill** (8–8)	33,054	45–78	W1
124	August 17	Padres	3–8	**Kyle Freeland** (3–5)	47,483	45–79	L1
125	August 18	Padres	3–2	**Angel Chivilli** (1–1)	26,027	46–79	W1
126	August 20	@ Nationals	3–1	**Austin Gomber** (4–8)	16,433	47–79	W2
127	August 21	@ Nationals	1–6	**Tanner Gordon** (0–5)	18,847	47–80	L1
128	August 22	@ Nationals	3–8	**Cal Quantrill** (8–9)	18,349	47–81	L2
129	August 23	@ Yankees	0–3	**Kyle Freeland** (3–6)	38,910	47–82	L3
130	August 24	@ Yankees	9–2	**Bradley Blalock** (1–0)	40,438	48–82	W1
131	August 25	@ Yankees	3–10	**Austin Gomber** (4–9)	41,324	48–83	L1
132	August 26	Marlins	3–2	**Jake Bird** (2–2)	20,338	49–83	W1
133	August 27	Marlins	8–9	**Angel Chivilli** (1–2)	20,284	49–84	L1
134	August 28	Marlins	8–2	**Kyle Freeland** (4–6)	20,526	50–84	W1
135	August 29	Marlins	8–12	**Bradley Blalock** (1–1)	20,949	50–85	L1
136	August 30	Orioles	3–5	**Austin Gomber** (4–10)	30,444	50–86	L2
137	August 31	Orioles	7–5	**Jeff Criswell** (1–0)	38,166	51–86	W1

September: 10–15 (Home 5–8, Road 5–7)

#	Date	Opponent	Score	Decision	Attendance	Record	Streak
138	September 1	Orioles	1–6	**Ty Blach** (3–7)	32,961	51–87	L1
139	September 3	@ Braves	0–3	**Kyle Freeland** (4–7)	32,672	51–88	L2
140	September 4	@ Braves	2–5	**Bradley Blalock** (1–2)	36,859	51–89	L3
141	September 5	@ Braves	3–1	**Austin Gomber** (5–10)	32,811	52–89	W1
142	September 6	@ Brewers	3–2	**Ryan Feltner** (2–10)	26,582	53–89	W2
143	September 7	@ Brewers	2–5	**Ty Blach** (3–8)	33,603	53–90	L1
144	September 8	@ Brewers	4–1	**Kyle Freeland** (5–7)	42,015	54–90	W1
145	September 10	@ Tigers	0–11	**Bradley Blalock** (1–3)	18,120	54–91	L1
146	September 11	@ Tigers	4–7	**Tanner Gordon** (0–6)	18,847	54–92	L2
147	September 12	@ Tigers	4–2	**Seth Halvorsen** (1–0)	19,538	55–92	W1
148	September 13	Cubs	9–5	**Victor Vodnik** (4–3)	38,406	56–92	W2
149	September 14	Cubs	6–5 (10)	**Tyler Kinley** (6–1)	47,493	57–92	W3
150	September 15	Cubs	2–6	**Cal Quantrill** (8–10)	40,706	57–93	L1
151	September 16	Diamondbacks	3–2	**Seth Halvorsen** (2–0)	18,454	58–93	W1
152	September 17	Diamondbacks	8–2	**Ryan Feltner** (3–10)	20,421	59–93	W2
153	September 18	Diamondbacks	4–9	**Austin Gomber** (5–11)	20,805	59–94	L1
154	September 20	@ Dodgers	4–6	**Kyle Freeland** (5–8)	49,073	59–95	L2
155	September 21	@ Dodgers	6–3	**Victor Vodnik** (5–3)	52,267	60–95	W1
156	September 22	@ Dodgers	5–6	**Seth Halvorsen** (2–1)	50,730	60–96	L1
157	September 24	Cardinals	3–7	**Angel Chivilli** (1–3)	25,924	60–97	L2
158	September 25	Cardinals	2–5	**Austin Gomber** (5–12)	26,863	60–98	L3
159	September 26	Cardinals	10–8	**Angel Chivilli** (2–3)	25,344	61–98	W1
160	September 27	Dodgers	4–11	**Cal Quantrill** (8–11)	48,750	61–99	L1
161	September 28	Dodgers	2–13	**Antonio Senzatela** (0–1)	48,395	61–100	L2
162	September 29	Dodgers	1–2	**Victor Vodnik** (5–4)	48,320	61–101	L3

== Season standings ==
=== National League West ===
NL West
Team	W	L	Pct.	GB	Home	Road
Los Angeles Dodgers	98	64	.605	—	52‍–‍29	46‍–‍35
San Diego Padres	93	69	.574	5	45‍–‍36	48‍–‍33
Arizona Diamondbacks	89	73	.549	9	44‍–‍37	45‍–‍36
San Francisco Giants	80	82	.494	18	42‍–‍39	38‍–‍43
Colorado Rockies	61	101	.377	37	37‍–‍44	24‍–‍57

=== National League Wild Card ===
Division leaders
Team	W	L	Pct.
Los Angeles Dodgers	98	64	.605
Philadelphia Phillies	95	67	.586
Milwaukee Brewers	93	69	.574

Wild Card teams (Top 3 teams qualify for postseason)
Team	W	L	Pct.	GB
San Diego Padres	93	69	.574	+4
Atlanta Braves	89	73	.549	—
New York Mets	89	73	.549	—
Arizona Diamondbacks	89	73	.549	—
St. Louis Cardinals	83	79	.512	6
Chicago Cubs	83	79	.512	6
San Francisco Giants	80	82	.494	9
Cincinnati Reds	77	85	.475	12
Pittsburgh Pirates	76	86	.469	13
Washington Nationals	71	91	.438	18
Miami Marlins	62	100	.383	27
Colorado Rockies	61	101	.377	28

=== Record vs. opponents ===
==== Record vs. National League ====
2024 National League record Source: MLB Standings Grid – 2024
Team	AZ	ATL	CHC	CIN	COL	LAD	MIA	MIL	NYM	PHI	PIT	SD	SF	STL	WSH	AL
Arizona	—	2–5	3–3	5–1	9–4	6–7	4–2	4–3	3–4	4–3	4–2	6–7	7–6	3–3	5–1	24–22
Atlanta	5–2	—	4–2	2–4	3–3	2–5	9–4	2–4	7–6	7–6	3–3	3–4	4–3	2–4	5–8	31–15
Chicago	3–3	2–4	—	5–8	4–2	4–2	4–3	5–8	3–4	2–4	7–6	2–4	3–4	6–7	6–1	27–19
Cincinnati	1–5	4–2	8–5	—	6–1	4–3	5–2	4–9	2–4	4–3	5–8	2–4	2–4	7–6	2–4	21–25
Colorado	4–9	3–3	2–4	1–6	—	3–10	2–5	4–3	2–4	2–4	2–4	8–5	3–10	3–4	2–4	20–26
Los Angeles	7–6	5–2	2–4	3–4	10–3	—	5–1	4–3	4–2	1–5	4–2	5–8	9–4	5–2	4–2	30–16
Miami	2–4	4–9	3–4	2–5	5–2	1–5	—	4–2	6–7	6–7	0–7	2–4	3–3	3–3	2–11	19–27
Milwaukee	3–4	4–2	8–5	9–4	3–4	3–4	2–4	—	5–1	2–4	7–6	2–5	4–2	8–5	2–4	31–15
New York	4–3	6–7	4–3	4–2	4–2	2–4	7–6	1–5	—	6–7	5–2	5–2	2–4	4–2	11–2	24–22
Philadelphia	3–4	6–7	4–2	3–4	4–2	5–1	7–6	4–2	7–6	—	3–4	5–1	5–2	4–2	9–4	26–20
Pittsburgh	2–4	3–3	6–7	8–5	4–2	2–4	7–0	6–7	2–5	4–3	—	0–6	2–4	5–8	4–3	20–26
San Diego	7–6	4–3	4–2	4–2	5–8	8–5	4–2	5–2	2–5	1–5	6–0	—	7–6	3–4	6–0	27–19
San Francisco	6–7	3–4	4–3	4–2	10–3	4–9	3–3	2–4	4–2	2–5	4–2	6–7	—	1–5	4–3	23–23
St. Louis	3–3	4–2	7–6	6–7	4–3	2–5	3–3	5–8	2–4	2–4	8–5	4–3	5–1	—	4–3	24–22
Washington	1–5	8–5	1–6	4–2	4–2	2–4	11–2	4–2	2–11	4–9	3–4	0–6	3–4	3–4	—	21–25

Updated with the results of all games through September 30, 2024.

==== Record vs. American League ====
2024 National League record vs. American League Source: MLB Standings
Team	BAL	BOS	CWS	CLE	DET	HOU	KC	LAA	MIN	NYY	OAK	SEA	TB	TEX	TOR
Arizona	1–2	3–0	2–1	3–0	1–2	1–2	2–1	2–1	1–2	1–2	2–1	1–2	0–3	2–2	2–1
Atlanta	1–2	3–1	1–2	2–1	3–0	3–0	2–1	2–1	3–0	2–1	2–1	1–2	2–1	2–1	2–1
Chicago	3–0	1–2	4–0	0–3	2–1	3–0	2–1	2–1	2–1	1–2	1–2	2–1	1–2	1–2	2–1
Cincinnati	0–3	1–2	3–0	1–3	0–3	3–0	0–3	3–0	2–1	3–0	1–2	0–3	1–2	1–2	2–1
Colorado	1–2	2–1	1–2	2–1	1–2	0–4	2–1	2–1	1–2	1–2	1–2	1–2	1–2	3–0	1–2
Los Angeles	2–1	3–0	3–0	2–1	1–2	1–2	2–1	2–2	2–1	2–1	2–1	3–0	2–1	1–2	2–1
Miami	2–1	0–3	2–1	1–2	2–1	0–3	1–2	0–3	2–1	1–2	1–2	2–1	1–3	1–2	3–0
Milwaukee	2–1	2–1	3–0	3–0	2–1	1–2	1–2	2–1	3–1	1–2	2–1	2–1	2–1	3–0	2–1
New York	2–1	3–0	3–0	0–3	1–2	1–2	2–1	1–2	2–1	4–0	1–2	0–3	0–3	2–1	2–1
Philadelphia	1–2	1–2	3–0	1–2	2–1	2–1	2–1	2–1	1–2	0–3	1–2	1–2	3–0	3–0	3–1
Pittsburgh	2–1	0–3	3–0	1–2	2–2	2–1	1–2	1–2	2–1	2–1	0–3	2–1	1–2	1–2	1–2
San Diego	2–1	2–1	3–0	2–1	2–1	2–1	2–1	0–3	2–1	1–2	3–0	1–3	2–1	2–1	1–2
San Francisco	2–1	1–2	2–1	1–2	2–1	2–1	3–0	1–2	2–1	0–3	2–2	1–2	1–2	2–1	1–2
St. Louis	3–0	2–1	1–2	2–1	1–2	1–2	1–3	2–1	2–1	2–1	2–1	1–2	2–1	2–1	0–3
Washington	2–2	1–2	1–2	1–2	2–1	2–1	0–3	2–1	1–2	2–1	1–2	2–1	1–2	1–2	2–1

Updated with the results of all games through September 30, 2024.

== Roster ==
2024 Colorado Rockies
Roster
Pitchers: 68 Jalen Beeks; 59 Jake Bird; 50 Ty Blach; 64 Bradley Blalock; 29 Matt Carasiti; 57 Angel Chivilli; 46 Jeff Criswell; 37 John Curtiss; 63 Noah Davis; 18 Ryan Feltner; 21 Kyle Freeland; 58 Lucas Gilbreath; 26 Austin Gomber; 29 Tanner Gordon; 54 Seth Halvorsen; 36 Geoff Hartlieb; 0 Jaden Hill; 32 Dakota Hudson; 56 Evan Justice; 40 Tyler Kinley; 54 Matt Koch; 20 Peter Lambert; 61 Justin Lawrence; 48 German Marquez; 46 Nick Mears; 43 Anthony Molina; 41 Luis Peralta; 41 Riley Pint; 47 Cal Quantrill; 60 Josh Rogers; 49 Antonio Senzatela; 46 Chasen Shreve; 38 Victor Vodnik	Catchers: 35 Elias Diaz; 3 Drew Romo; 25 Jacob Stallings; Infielders: 1 Adael Amador; 24 Ryan McMahon; 44 Elehuris Montero; 7 Brendan Rodgers; 30 Aaron Schunk; 4 Michael Toglia; 14 Ezequiel Tovar; 13 Alan Trejo	Outfielders: 27 Jordan Beck; 19 Charlie Blackmon; 12 Sean Bouchard; 23 Kris Bryant; 11 Jake Cave; 9 Brenton Doyle; 15 Hunter Goodman; 16 Sam Hilliard; 2 Greg Jones; 22 Nolan Jones	Manager: 10 Bud Black; Coaches: 74 Reid Cornelius (bullpen); 75 Kyle Cunningham (asst. bullpen catcher); 53 Ronnie Gideon (first base); 70 Andy González (asst. hitting); 31 Hensley Meulens (hitting); 77 Aaron Muñoz (bullpen catcher); 68 P. J. Pilittere (asst. hitting); 8 Mike Redmond (bench); 34 Warren Schaeffer (third base); 72 Darryl Scott (pitching)

== Statistics ==
Note: Stats in bold are the team leaders.

- Indicates league leader.

=== Batting ===
Note: G = Games played; AB = At bats; R = Runs; H = Hits; 2B = Doubles; 3B = Triples; HR = Home runs; RBI = Runs batted in; BB = Walks; SO = Strikeouts; AVG = Batting average; OBP = On-base percentage; SLG = Slugging; OPS = On base + slugging

Player	G	AB	R	H	2B	3B	HR	RBI	SB	CS	BB	SO	AVG	OBP	SLG	OPS
Ezequiel Tovar	**157**	**655***	**83**	**176**	**45***	4	**26**	**78**	6	5	23	**200**	**.269**	.295	**.469**	.763
Ryan McMahon	153	567	68	137	28	0	20	65	4	**6**	**69**	185	.242	**.325**	.397	.722
Brenton Doyle	149	542	82	141	24	4	23	72	**30**	5	46	153	.260	.317	.446	**.764**
Brendan Rodgers	135	501	67	134	29	1	13	54	1	0	31	132	.267	.314	.407	.721
Charlie Blackmon	124	449	59	115	24	**5**	12	52	6	2	43	86	.256	.329	.412	.741
Michael Toglia	116	399	62	87	14	3	25	55	10	1	54	147	.218	.311	.456	.767
Jake Cave	123	323	42	81	16	**5**	7	37	5	2	18	98	.251	.290	.396	.686
Elías Díaz	84	304	26	82	18	0	5	36	0	0	17	64	.270	.315	.378	.693
Nolan Jones	79	256	28	58	13	1	3	28	5	4	36	91	.227	.321	.320	.641
Jacob Stallings	82	243	31	64	17	1	9	36	0	0	27	65	.263	.357	.453	.810
Elehuris Montero	67	224	23	46	10	0	4	28	0	0	20	56	.205	.267	.304	.571
Hunter Goodman	70	211	24	40	9	0	13	36	1	1	8	64	.190	.228	.417	.645
Jordan Beck	55	170	14	32	6	0	3	13	7	1	12	65	.188	.245	.276	.521
Sam Hilliard	58	138	26	33	5	1	10	27	5	2	14	56	.239	.305	.507	.812
Kris Bryant	37	133	9	29	5	0	2	15	0	0	13	48	.218	.323	.301	.623
Aaron Schunk	39	94	14	22	3	0	2	7	0	1	4	31	.234	.265	.330	.595
Sean Bouchard	31	91	14	17	7	0	1	8	4	0	12	33	.187	.290	.297	.586
Alan Trejo	28	63	4	9	0	0	0	1	0	0	2	15	.143	.182	.143	.325
Drew Romo	16	51	4	9	3	0	0	6	0	1	2	18	.176	.208	.235	.443
Adael Amador	10	35	1	6	1	0	0	0	1	0	1	6	.171	.194	.200	.394
Greg Jones	6	5	1	1	0	0	1	1	0	0	1	4	.200	.333	.800	1.133
Kyle Freeland	1	0	0	0	0	0	0	0	0	1	0	0	.000	.000	.000	.000
**Team totals**	**162**	**5454**	**682**	**1319**	**277**	**25**	**179**	**655**	**85**	**31**	**453**	**1617**	**.242**	**.304**	**.400**	**.704**

=== Pitching ===
List does not include position players. Stats in bold are the team leaders.

- Indicates league leader.

Note: W = Wins; L = Losses; ERA = Earned run average; G = Games pitched; GS = Games started; SV = Saves; IP = Innings pitched; H = Hits allowed; R = Runs allowed; ER = Earned runs allowed; BB = Walks allowed; K = Strikeouts

Player	W	L	ERA	G	GS	SV	IP	H	R	ER	BB	K
Austin Gomber	5	**12**	4.75	30	**30**	0	**165.0**	**178**	89	**87**	38	116
Ryan Feltner	3	10	**4.49**	30	**30**	0	162.1	165	**94**	81	52	**138**
Cal Quantrill	**8**	11	4.98	29	29	0	148.1	156	83	82	**69***	110
Kyle Freeland	5	8	5.24	21	21	0	113.1	134	73	66	26	85
Dakota Hudson	2	**12**	6.17	18	18	0	89.0	99	66	61	50	49
Victor Vodnik	5	4	4.28	64	0	9	73.2	72	37	35	37	65
Ty Blach	3	8	6.94	20	12	0	71.1	103	55	55	18	36
Tyler Kinley	6	1	6.19	**67**	0	**12**	64.0	61	44	44	33	72
Peter Lambert	2	5	5.72	28	3	0	61.1	73	42	39	29	50
Justin Lawrence	4	4	6.49	56	0	2	59.2	73	52	43	33	45
Anthony Molina	1	1	6.79	35	1	0	59.2	72	46	45	22	41
Jalen Beeks	6	4	4.74	45	0	9	49.1	49	29	26	18	38
Nick Mears	1	4	5.56	41	0	0	45.1	47	30	28	21	57
Jake Bird	2	2	4.50	35	0	1	40.0	43	21	20	25	31
Tanner Gordon	0	6	8.65	8	8	0	34.1	53	34	33	6	26
Angel Chivilli	2	3	4.55	30	0	1	31.2	31	17	16	10	28
Bradley Blalock	1	3	6.07	6	6	0	29.2	35	22	20	19	20
Noah Davis	0	0	5.75	9	0	0	20.1	31	15	13	7	15
Jeff Criswell	1	0	2.75	13	0	0	19.2	20	6	6	9	27
Antonio Senzatela	0	1	6.57	3	3	0	12.1	15	10	9	8	7
Luis Peralta	0	0	0.73	15	0	0	12.1	7	1	1	5	14
Seth Halvorsen	2	1	1.46	12	0	2	12.1	8	3	2	2	13
Josh Rogers	2	0	6.55	6	0	0	11.0	15	8	8	3	3
Jaden Hill	0	0	5.06	9	0	0	10.2	8	7	6	4	6
Geoff Hartlieb	0	0	9.00	5	0	0	9.0	13	10	9	4	7
Matt Carasiti	0	1	10.38	7	0	0	8.2	16	10	10	3	7
Germán Márquez	0	0	6.75	1	1	0	4.0	5	3	3	4	3
Riley Pint	0	0	21.60	4	0	0	3.1	5	8	8	5	7
John Curtiss	0	0	15.43	3	0	0	2.1	6	4	4	0	1
Lucas Gilbreath	0	0	54.00	3	0	0	1.0	7	6	6	1	0
Chasen Shreve	0	0	0.00	1	0	0	1.0	1	0	0	0	0
Matt Koch	0	0	81.00	2	0	1	0.1	3	4	3	1	0
Evan Justice	0	0	0.00	1	0	0	0.1	0	0	0	1	1
**Team totals**	**61**	**101**	**5.47**	**162**	**162**	**37**	**1426.2**	**1604**	**929**	**867**	**563**	**1118**

== Transactions ==
=== April ===
- April 17: Placed OF Kris Bryant on the 10-day IL, recalled OF Sean Bouchard from AAA Albuquerque.
- April 19: Placed LHP Kyle Freeland on the 15-day IL, recalled RHP Noah Davis from AAA Albuquerque.
- April 21: Transferred RHP Daniel Bard from the 15-day IL to the 60-day IL. Selected the contract of LHP Ty Blach from AAA Albuquerque.
- April 22: Optioned RHP Noah Davis to AAA Albuquerque.
- April 24: Recalled C/1B Hunter Goodman from AAA Albuquerque, optioned 1B/OF Michael Toglia to AAA Albuquerque.
- April 27: Recalled 1B/OF Michael Toglia from AAA Albuquerque.
- April 29: Optioned 1B/OF Michael Toglia to AAA Albuquerque.
- April 30: Selected the contract of OF Jordan Beck from AAA Albuquerque. Placed LHP Lucas Gilbreath on the 60-day IL. Placed OF Nolan Jones on the 10-day IL.

=== May ===
- May 3: Placed RHP Justin Lawrence on the paternity list. Recalled RHP Angel Chivilli from AA Hartford.
- May 6: Activated RHP Justin Lawrence from the paternity list. Optioned RHP Angel Chivilli to AA Hartford.
- May 19: Placed RHP Jake Bird on the 15-day IL. Designated INF Julio Carreras for assignment. Selected the contract of RHP Matt Koch from AAA Albuquerque.
- May 21: OF Sean Bouchard optioned to AAA Albuquerque. INF Julio Carreras sent outright to AAA Albuquerque. OF Kris Bryant activated from 10-day IL.
- May 24: Optioned RHP Peter Lambert to AAA Albuquerque. Selected the contract of RHP Matt Carasiti from AAA Albuquerque. Designated RHP Matt Koch for assignment. Selected the contract of RHP John Curtiss from AAA Albuquerque. Transferred LHP Kyle Freeland to the 60-day IL.
- May 26: OF Jordan Beck placed on the 10-day IL. OF Sean Bouchard recalled from AAA Albuquerque.
- May 27: Designated RHP John Curtiss for assignment. Placed RHP Justin Lawrence on the 15-day IL. Recalled RHP Peter Lambert from AAA Albuquerque. Selected the contract of LHP Josh Rogers from AAA Albuquerque.
- May 29: Sent RHP John Curtiss outright to AAA Albuquerque.

=== June ===
- June 3: Recalled RHP Angel Chivilli from AA Hartford. Optioned RHP Peter Lambert to AAA Albuquerque.
- June 6: Placed OF Kris Bryant and OF Sean Bouchard on the 10-day IL. Recalled 1B/OF Michael Toglia and SS Greg Jones from AAA Albuquerque.
- June 8: Designated RHP Matt Carasiti for assignment. Selected the contract of RHP Geoff Hartlieb from AAA Albuquerque.
- June 9: Placed 2B Brendan Rodgers on the 10-day IL. Recalled INF Adael Amador from AA Hartford.
- June 10: Sent RHP Matt Carasiti outright to AAA Albuquerque.
- June 14: Placed C Elías Díaz on the 10-day IL. Activated OF Nolan Jones from the 10-day IL.
- June 17: Activated RHP Jake Bird and RHP Justin Lawrence from the 15-day IL. Optioned RHP Angel Chivilli to AA Hartford. Placed LHP Josh Rogers on the 15-day IL.
- June 18: RHP Gavin Hollowell claimed off of waivers by Arizona Diamondbacks.
- June 19: Activated RHP Sean Bouchard from the 10-day IL. Optioned SS Greg Jones to AAA Albuquerque.
- June 21: Selected the contract of OF Sam Hilliard from AAA Albuquerque. Activated 2B Brendan Rodgers from the 10-day IL. Placed INF Adael Amador and OF Charlie Blackmon on the 10-day IL.
- June 22: Selected the contract of LHP Austin Kitchen from AAA Albuquerque. Designated RHP Geoff Hartlieb for assignment.
- June 23: Activated LHP Kyle Freeland from the 60-day IL. Designated LHP Austin Kitchen for assignment.
- June 26: Placed RHP Jake Bird on the 15-day IL.
- June 28: Recalled RHP Riley Pint from AAA Albuquerque. Selected the contract of INF Aaron Schunk from AAA Albuquerque. Designated INF Alan Trejo for assignment.
- June 29: Activated OF Charlie Blackmon from the 10-day IL. Optioned OF Sean Bouchard to AAA Albuquerque.
- June 30: Activated C Elías Díaz from the 10-day IL. Designated 1B/DH Elehuris Montero for assignment.

=== July ===
- July 3: Recalled RHP Peter Lambert from AAA Albuquerque. Optioned RHP Riley Pint to AAA Albuquerque. Activated from the 10-day IL and optioned INF Adael Amador to AA Hartford.
- July 4: Sent 1B/DH Elehuris Montero outright to AAA Albuquerque.
- July 7: Selected the contract of RHP Tanner Gordon from AAA Albuquerque. Designated RHP Dakota Hudson for assignment.
- July 10: Optioned RHP Jake Bird to AAA Albuquerque.
- July 11: Sent RHP Dakota Hudson outright to AAA Albuquerque.
- July 13: Optioned RHP Tanner Gordon to AAA Albuquerque. Placed OF Nolan Jones on the 10-day IL. Recalled RHP Angel Chivilli from AA Hartford and OF Sean Bouchard from AAA Albuquerque.
- July 14: Optioned LHP Josh Rogers to AAA Albuquerque and RHP Angel Chivilli to AA Hartford. Activated RHP Germán Márquez from the 60-day IL.
- July 15: Designated LHP Josh Rogers for assignment. Claimed off waivers LHP Antoine Kelly from Texas Rangers and optioned him to ACL Rockies.
- July 17: Sent LHP Josh Rogers outright to AAA Albuquerque.
- July 22: Placed RHP Germán Márquez on the 7-day IL. Recalled RHP Noah Davis from AAA Albuquerque.
- July 23: Activated OF/DH Kris Bryant from the 10-day IL. Optioned OF Sean Bouchard to AAA Albuquerque.
- July 27: Traded RHP Nick Mears to the Milwaukee Brewers for minor-league RHP Bradley Blalock and minor-league RHP Yujanyer Herrera. Selected the contract of RHP John Curtiss from AAA Albuquerque. Recalled RHP Jake Bird from AAA Albuquerque. Recalled RHP Tanner Gordon from AAA ALbuquerque. Designated LHP Ty Blach for assignment.
- July 28: Optioned RHP Tanner Gordon to AAA Albuquerque.
- July 29: Traded LHP Jalen Beeks to the Pittsburgh Pirates for minor-league LHP Luis Peralta.
- July 30: Recalled RHP Angel Chivilli from AAA Albuquerque.

=== August ===
- August 2: Sent LHP Ty Blach outright to AAA Albuquerque.
- August 3: Activated OF Jordan Beck from the 10-day IL and optioned him to AAA Albuquerque. Recalled RHP Tanner Gordon from AAA Albuquerque. Optioned RHP Jake Bird to AAA Albuquerque.
- August 6: Selected the contract of LHP Chasen Shreve from AAA Albuquerque. Designated RHP John Curtiss for assignment.
- August 8: Recalled RHP Riley Pint from AAA Albuquerque. Placed RHP Ryan Feltner on the 15-day IL.
- August 9: Sent RHP John Curtiss outright to AAA Albuquerque.
- August 10: Selected the contract of RHP Dakota Hudson from AAA Albuquerque. Designated LHP Chasen Shreve for assignment.
- August 11: Selected the contract of LHP Josh Rogers from AAA Albuquerque. Placed RHP Dakota Hudson on the 15-day IL.
- August 12: Recalled RHP Bradley Blalock and OF Jordan Beck from AAA Albuquerque. Optioned LHP Josh Rogers to AAA Albuquerque. Placed OF/DH Kris Bryant on the 10-day IL.
- August 14: Sent LHP Josh Rogers outright to AAA Albuquerque. LHP Chasen Shreve elected free agency.
- August 15: Optioned RHP Riley Pint to AAA Albuquerque.
- August 16: Selected the contract of C Drew Romo from AAA Albuquerque. Released C Elías Díaz. Activated LHP Lucas Gilbreath from the 60-day IL.
- August 17: Sent RHP Riley Pint outright to AAA Albuquerque.
- August 18: Activated OF Nolan Jones from the 10-day IL. Optioned C/OF Hunter Goodman to AAA Albuquerque.
- August 21: Placed RHP Victor Vodnik on the 15-day IL. Selected the contract of RHP Jeff Criswell from AAA Albuquerque.
- August 23: Selected the contract of LHP Luis Peralta from AAA Albuquerque. Optioned RHP Tanner Gordon to AAA Albuquerque. Transferred RHP Germán Márquez to the 60-day IL from the 15-day IL.
- August 26: Activated RHP Ryan Feltner from the 15-day IL. Recalled RHP Jake Bird from AAA Albuquerque. Placed LHP Lucas Gilbreath on the 15-day IL. Optioned RHP Peter Lambert to AAA Albuquerque.
- August 29: Sent LHP Antoine Kelly outright to AAA Albuquerque.
- August 30: Selected the contract of RHP Seth Halvorsen from AAA Albuquerque. Optioned RHP Noah Davis to AAA Albuquerque.

=== September ===
- September 1: Recalled C/UTL Hunter Goodman and LHP Evan Justice from AAA Albuquerque. Placed RHP Cal Quantrill on the 15-day IL. Selected the contract of LHP Ty Blach from AAA Albuquerque. Removed RHP Noah Davis outright from the 40-man roster.
- September 5: Selected the contracts of LHP Ty Blach and RHP Jaden Hill from AAA Albuquerque. Optioned LHP Evan Justice to AAA Albuquerque. Transferred RHP Dakota Hudson to the 60-day IL from the 15-day IL.
- September 8: Designated LHP Ty Blach for assignment. Activated RHP Victor Vodnik from the 15-day IL.
- September 10: Placed LHP Austin Gomber on the paternity list. Recalled RHP Tanner Gordon from AAA Albuquerque. Sent LHP Ty Blach outright to AAA Albuquerque.
- September 13: Activated LHP Austin Gomber from the paternity list. Optioned RHP Tanner Gordon to AAA Albuquerque.
- September 15: Activated RHP Cal Quantrill from the 15-day IL. Optioned RHP Bradley Blalock to AAA Albuquerque.
- September 16: Activated RHP Antonio Senzatela from the 60-day IL. Optioned RHP Jake Bird to AAA Albuquerque.
- September 20: Placed RHP Tyler Kinley on the 15-day IL. Recalled RHP Jake Bird from AAA Albuquerque.

== Farm system ==
Level	Team	League	Manager	W	L	Position
AAA	Albuquerque Isotopes	Pacific Coast League (East Division)	Pedro Lopez	58	92	5th Place; 35.5 GB
AA	Hartford Yard Goats	Eastern League (Northeast Division)	Bobby Meacham	76	60	2nd Place; 1.0 GB
High A	Spokane Indians	Northwest League	Robinson Cancel	79	51	1st Place
Low A	Fresno Grizzlies	California League (North Division)	Steve Soliz	67	64	3rd Place; 7.0 GB
Rookie	ACL Rockies	Arizona Complex League (East Division)	Fred Ocasio	29	31	4th Place; 10.0 GB
Foreign Rookie	DSL Rockies	Dominican Summer League (South Division)	Mauricio Gonzalez	37	18	3rd Place; 1.5 GB
Foreign Rookie	DSL Colorado	Dominican Summer League (East Division)	Eugenio Jose	28	27	5th Place; 4.5 GB

== Major League Baseball draft ==
The 2024 draft was held July 14–16, 2024.

2024 Draft Picks

Round	Pick	Name	Position	School	Signed
1	3	Charlie Condon	OF	Georgia	Yes ($9.25m)
CB-A	38	Brody Brecht	RHP	Iowa	Yes ($2.70m)
2	42	Jared Thomas	CF	Texas	Yes ($2.00m)
3	77	Cole Messina	C	South Carolina	Yes ($1.01m)
4	106	Blake Wright	SS	Clemson	Yes ($250.00k)
5	139	Lebarron Johnson Jr.	RHP	Texas	Yes ($500.00k)
6	168	Konner Eaton	LHP	George Mason	Yes ($378.90k)
7	198	Fidel Ulloa	RHP	LSU	Yes ($295.30k)
8	228	Luke Jewett	RHP	UCLA	Yes ($234.20k)
9	258	Tommy Hopfe	1B	Fresno State	Yes ($100.00k)
10	288	Fisher Jameson	RHP	Florida	Yes ($185.80k)
11	318	Alan Espinal	C	Vanderbilt	Yes ($200.00k)
12	348	Everett Catlett	LHP	Georgetown	Yes ($200.00k)
13	378	Justin Loer	LHP	LSU	Yes ($150.00k)
14	408	Sam Gerth	RHP	Navarro College	Yes ($300.00k)
15	438	Luke Thelen	RHP	Western Michigan	Yes ($150.00k)
16	468	Kevin Fitzer	RHP	Cal State Northridge	Yes ($100.00k)
17	498	Nolan Clifford	SS	Creighton	Yes ($50.00k)
18	528	Tyler Hampu	RHP	Austin Peay	Yes ($50.00k)
19	558	Nathan Blasick	RHP	New Orleans	Yes ($50.00k)
20	588	Hunter Omlid	RHP	Arizona State	Yes ($50.00k)

Records
Preceded by 2023	Colorado Rockies seasons 2024	Succeeded by 2025
