= Geoff Hartlieb =

American baseball player (born 1993)

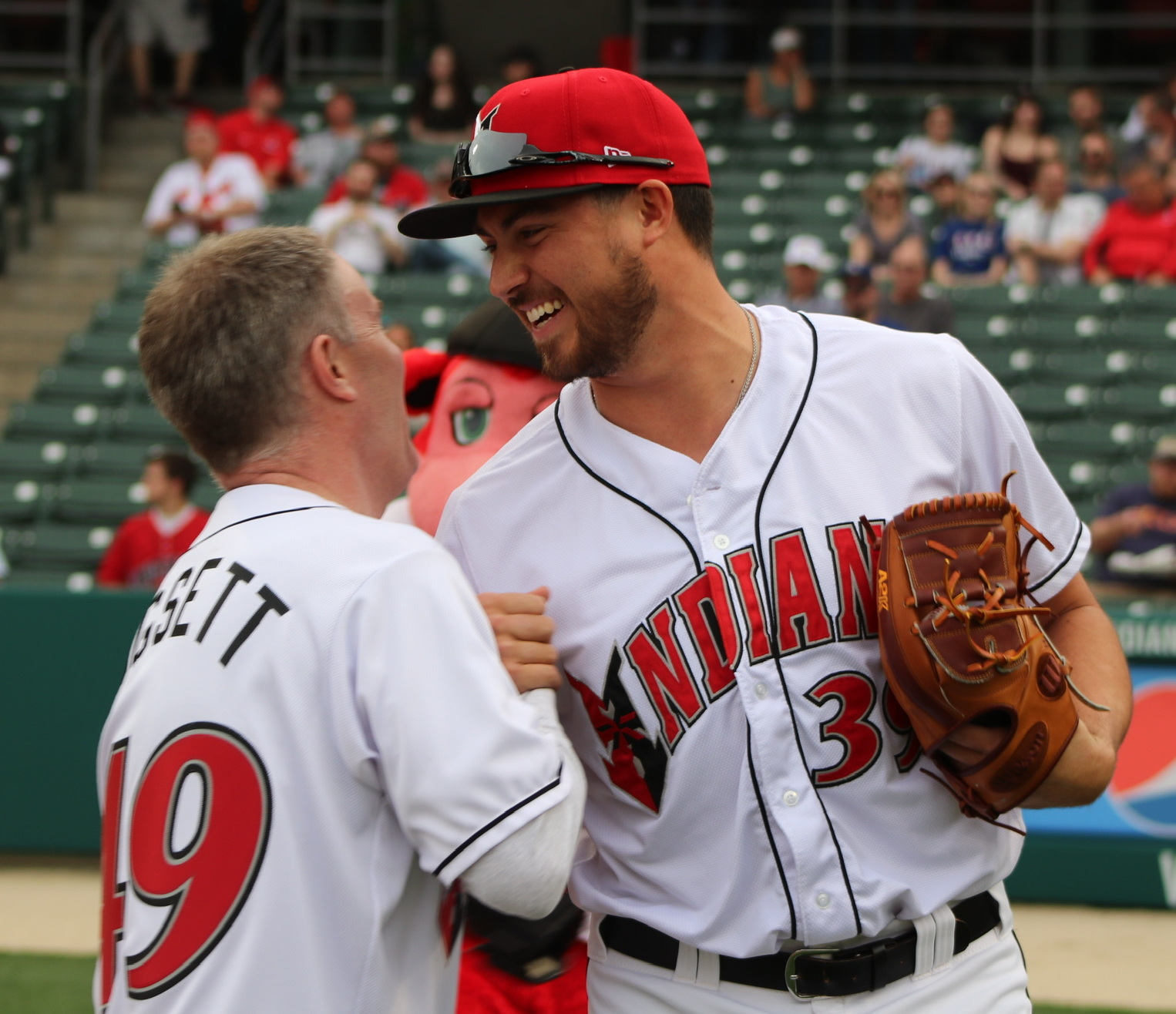
- Hartlieb (right) with Joe Hogsett in 2019

Philadelphia Phillies
- Pitcher
- Born: December 9, 1993 (age 32); Highland, Illinois, U.S.
- Bats: Right Throws: Right

MLB debut
- May 18, 2019, for the Pittsburgh Pirates

MLB statistics (through 2026 season)
- Win–loss record: 3–2
- Earned run average: 7.16
- Strikeouts: 103
- Stats at Baseball Reference

Teams
- Pittsburgh Pirates (2019–2021); New York Mets (2021); Miami Marlins (2023); Colorado Rockies (2024); New York Yankees (2025); Detroit Tigers (2025); Athletics (2026)

Geoffrey Thomas Hartlieb (born December 9, 1993) is an American professional baseball pitcher in the Philadelphia Phillies organization. He has previously played in Major League Baseball (MLB) for the Pittsburgh Pirates, New York Mets, Miami Marlins, Colorado Rockies, New York Yankees, Detroit Tigers, and Athletics.

== Amateur career ==
Hartlieb attended Highland High School in Highland, Illinois. Hartlieb was all-state in basketball his junior and senior years of high school, and originally quit baseball at the end high school. He attended Quincy University in Quincy, Illinois his freshman year of college in 2013 and played college basketball for the Hawks. He then transferred to Lindenwood University in Saint Charles, Missouri to play college baseball from 2014 through 2016. He was drafted by the New York Mets in the 37th round of the 2015 MLB draft, but did not sign and returned to Lindenwood.

== Professional career ==
=== Pittsburgh Pirates ===
The Pittsburgh Pirates selected Hartlieb in the 29th round of the 2016 Major League Baseball draft and signed. He signed with the Pirates spent his first professional season with the Bristol Pirates in 2016, going 4–1 with a 4.44 earned run average (ERA) in 26 innings pitched. He spent the 2017 season with the West Virginia Power and the Bradenton Marauders, combining to go 2–6 with a 2.12 ERA in 63 2/3 innings. In 2018, he played for the Altoona Curve, going 8–2 with a 3.24 ERA in 58 innings. During the 2018 offseason, he played for the Surprise Saguaros of the Arizona Fall League. Hartlieb opened the 2019 season with the Triple-A Indianapolis Indians.

The Pirates promoted Hartlieb to the major leagues for the first time on May 17, 2019. He made his major-league debut on May 18 versus the San Diego Padres. In 2020 for Pittsburgh, Hartlieb pitched to a 3.63 ERA, allowing only one home run in 22 1/3 innings pitched. In 2021, Hartlieb split the between Indianapolis and Pittsburgh, but struggled to a 7.71 ERA in four major-league appearances before he was designated for assignment on July 3, 2021.

=== New York Mets ===
On July 9, 2021, Hartlieb was claimed off waivers by the New York Mets and was assigned to the Triple-A Syracuse Mets. Hartlieb made seven appearances for the Mets in 2021, struggling to an 11.00 ERA with nine strikeouts. On September 2, Hartlieb was designated for assignment by the Mets.

=== Boston Red Sox ===
On September 4, 2021, Hartlieb was claimed off of waivers by the Boston Red Sox, and was optioned to the Triple-A Worcester Red Sox. On September 23, Hartlieb was designated for assignment by the Red Sox. He cleared waivers and was sent outright to Worcester on September 26.

Hartlieb spent the entirety of the 2022 season with Triple–A Worcester. In 40 appearances, he registered a 3–6 record and 5.16 ERA with 64 strikeouts in 61.0 innings of work. He elected free agency following the season on November 10, 2022.

=== Miami Marlins ===
On November 29, 2022, Hartlieb signed a minor league deal with the Miami Marlins. In 26 games for the Triple–A Jacksonville Jumbo Shrimp, he posted a 3.18 ERA with 36 strikeouts and 6 saves in 34 innings of work. On August 6, 2023, the Marlins selected Hartlieb's contract, adding him to the major league roster. He made his Miami debut that day, tossing an inning against the Texas Rangers and allowing one run while striking out two. Hartlieb would make only one more appearance for the Marlins before he was designated for assignment on September 6. He cleared waivers and was sent outright to Triple–A Jacksonville on September 8. On October 5, Hartlieb elected free agency.

=== Colorado Rockies ===
On November 13, 2023, Hartlieb signed a minor league contract with the Colorado Rockies. In 22 games for the Triple–A Albuquerque Isotopes, he logged a 5.61 ERA with 34 strikeouts across 33 2/3 inning pitched. On June 8, 2024, the Rockies selected Hartlieb's contract, adding him to their active roster. In five games for Colorado, he struggled to a 9.00 ERA with seven strikeouts across nine innings pitched. Hartlieb was designated for assignment following the promotion of Austin Kitchen on June 22. He cleared waivers and was sent outright to Albuquerque on June 25. Hartlieb elected free agency on October 2.

=== New York Yankees ===
On October 18, 2024, Hartlieb signed a minor league contract with the New York Yankees. In 24 appearances for the Triple-A Scranton/Wilkes-Barre RailRiders, he posted a 3-2 record and 3.34 ERA with 38 strikeouts and two saves across 35 innings of work. On June 30, 2025, the Yankees selected Hartlieb's contract, adding him to their active roster. In his only appearance on July 1, Hartlieb allowed three runs in one inning of work against the Toronto Blue Jays. The next day, he was designated for assignment by the Yankees. Hartlieb elected free agency in lieu of an outright assignment on July 4. On July 6, Hartlieb re-signed with New York on a major league contract. He made another sole appearance for the team before being designated for assignment a second time on July 9. Hartlieb elected free agency after clearing waivers on July 11.

=== Detroit Tigers ===
On July 12, 2025, Hartlieb signed a minor league contract with the Detroit Tigers. He made two scoreless appearances for the Triple-A Toledo Mud Hens, recording one win, four strikeouts, and one save across 4 1/3 innings pitched. On July 24, the Tigers selected Hartlieb's contract, adding him to their active roster. Hartlieb was designated for assignment on July 26 after appearing in only two games for the Tigers. He cleared waivers and elected free agency on July 30. The next day, Hartlieb re-signed with the Tigers organization on a minor league contract. He was released on August 19.

=== Kansas City Royals ===
On August 27, 2025, Hartlieb signed a minor league contract with the Kansas City Royals organization. He made seven appearances for the Triple-A Omaha Storm Chasers, but struggled to an 0-1 record and 9.00 ERA with 10 strikeouts over eight innings of work. Hartlieb elected free agency following the season on November 6.

=== Athletics ===
On November 20, 2025, Hartlieb signed a minor league contract with the Athletics. On June 20, 2026, the Athletics selected Hartlieb's contract, adding him to their active roster. He allowed five earned runs with three strikeouts across 8 2/3 innings pitched spanning four appearances for the team. Hartlieb was designated for assignment by the Athletics on July 3. He cleared waivers and was sent outright to the Triple-A Las Vegas Aviators the following day. On July 18, the Athletics added Hartlieb back to their active roster. After struggling across four more appearances, Hartlieb was designated for assignment again on July 27. He again cleared waivers and was sent outright to Triple–A Las Vegas on July 29. On September 2, he had his contract selected to the major league roster again. On October 29, he was sent outright to Triple-A Las Vegas Aviators. He elected free agency on November 2.

=== Philadelphia Phillies ===
On November 13, 2026, Hartlieb signed a minor league contract with the Philadelphia Phillies.
