= Sean Bouchard =

American baseball player (born 1996)

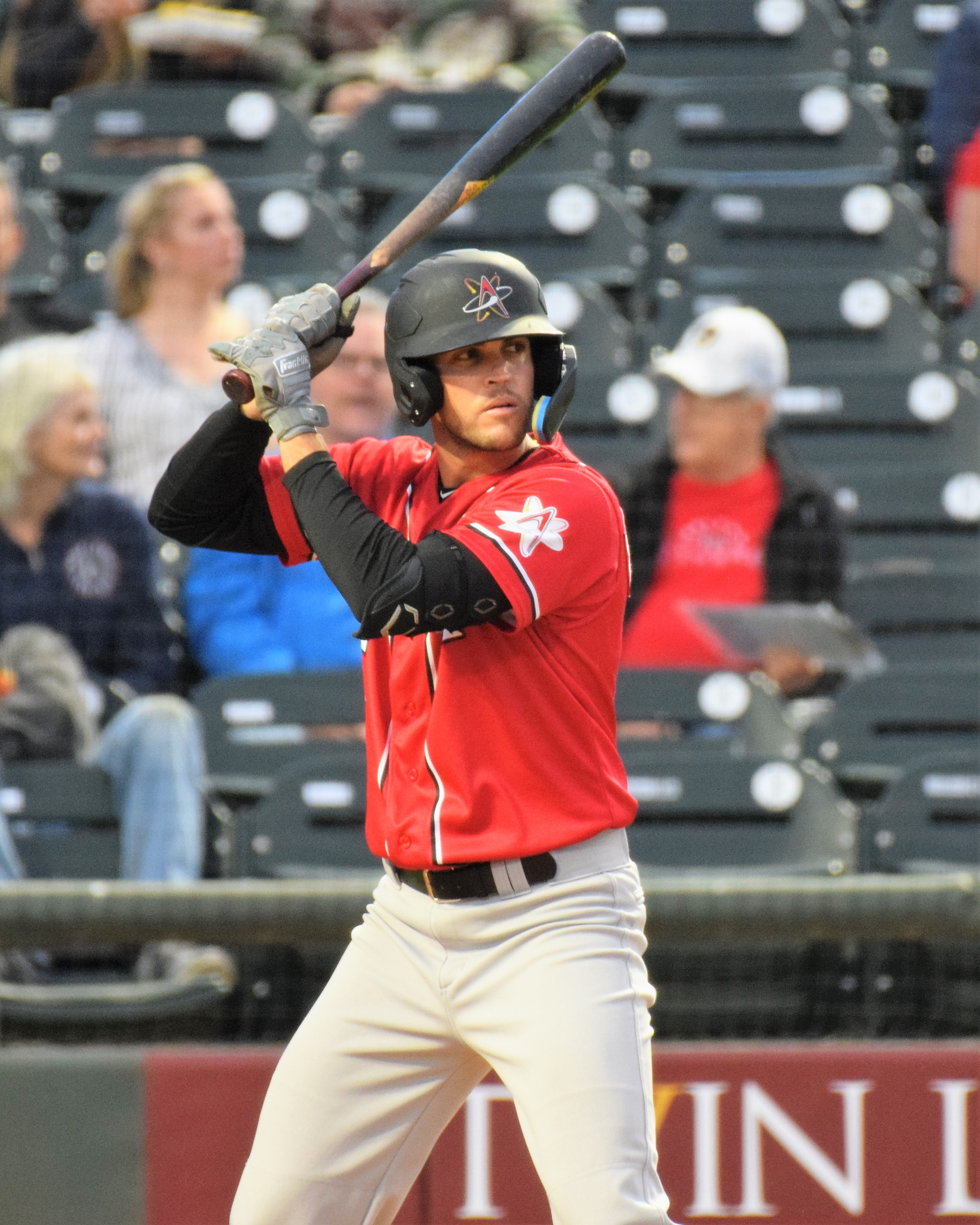
- Bouchard with the Albuquerque Isotopes in 2022

Free agent
- First baseman / Outfielder
- Born: May 16, 1996 (age 30); San Diego, California, U.S.
- Bats: Right Throws: Right

MLB debut
- June 19, 2022, for the Colorado Rockies

MLB statistics (through 2025 season)
- Batting average: .230
- Home runs: 9
- Runs batted in: 33
- Stats at Baseball Reference

Teams
- Colorado Rockies (2022–2025)

Sean Walter Bernard Bouchard (born May 16, 1996) is an American professional baseball first baseman and outfielder who is a free agent. He has previously played in Major League Baseball (MLB) for the Colorado Rockies.

== Amateur career ==
Bouchard attended Cathedral Catholic High School in San Diego, California. In 2014, his senior year, he hit .379 with 9 home runs in 32 games and was named the San Diego Union-Tribune Eastern League Player of the year. That summer, he played collegiate summer baseball for the Walla Walla Sweets of the West Coast League.

Bouchard then attended the University of California, Los Angeles (UCLA), where he played college baseball for the Bruins. He was teammates with future Colorado Rockies teammates Jake Bird and Michael Toglia. In the summer of 2016, he played summer baseball with the Chatham Anglers of the Cape Cod Baseball League. In 2017, he was a first-team All-Pacific 12 Conference first baseman and led UCLA in on-base percentage and slugging percentage.

== Professional career ==
The Colorado Rockies selected Bouchard in the ninth round of the 2017 MLB draft. He made his professional debut for the Class A Short SeasonBoise Hawks, posting a .290/.390/.477 slash line that summer. In 2018, he played in 125 games for the Single-A Asheville Tourists, batting .257/.324/.430 with 14 home runs, 75 RBI, and 22 stolen bases. He led the South Atlantic League with 34 doubles and began playing in the outfield. In 2019, he played for the High-A Lancaster JetHawks and was named a California League mid-season All-Star slashing .292/.354/.496 with 13 home runs and 68 RBI in 91 games.

Bouchard did not play in a game in 2020 due to the cancellation of the minor league season because of the COVID-19 pandemic. In 2021, he played in 91 games for the Double-A Hartford Yard Goats, hitting .266/.336/.494 with 14 home runs, 46 RBI, and 8 stolen bases.

Bouchard was assigned to the Triple-A Albuquerque Isotopes to begin the 2022 season. He was called up to the majors for the first time by the Rockies on June 16. He made his debut on June 19, in which he went 0-for-3 with a walk. He went hitless in seven at-bats before he suffered a strained left oblique and was placed on the injured list (IL) on June 27. On July 16, after a short rehab stint, he was activated from the IL and optioned to Triple-A. He returned to the Rockies on August 30 and recorded his first career hit, a single off of Jay Jackson of the Atlanta Braves. Bouchard hit his first major league home run on September 2, a two-run shot off of Luis Cessa of the Cincinnati Reds. Bouchard finished the season appearing in 27 games for the Rockies, hitting .297/.454/.500 with 3 home runs and 11 RBI. He led the National League in on-base percentage and walk rate from August 30 to the end of the season.

On March 8, 2023, Bouchard suffered a ruptured left biceps muscle in a spring training game that required surgery that was initially announced would end his season. However, he rehabilitated the injury and was activated from the 60-day IL on August 14; he was subsequently optioned to Triple-A. In 21 games for Colorado late in the year, Bouchard hit .316/.372/.684 with four home runs and seven RBI.

Bouchard was optioned to Triple-A Albuquerque to begin the 2024 season after suffering an oblique injury in spring training. In 31 games for the Rockies in his rookie season, Bouchard batted .187/.290/.297 with one home run, eight RBI, and four stolen bases. He underwent surgery in November to repair a fractured hamate bone in his left hand.

Bouchard played in 32 games for Colorado in 2025, batting .167/.247/.242 with one home run, seven RBI, and one stolen base. He was designated for assignment by the Rockies on July 25. He cleared waivers and was sent outright to Triple-A on August 1. He elected free agency following the season on November 6.
