= Sam Hilliard =

American baseball player (born 1994)

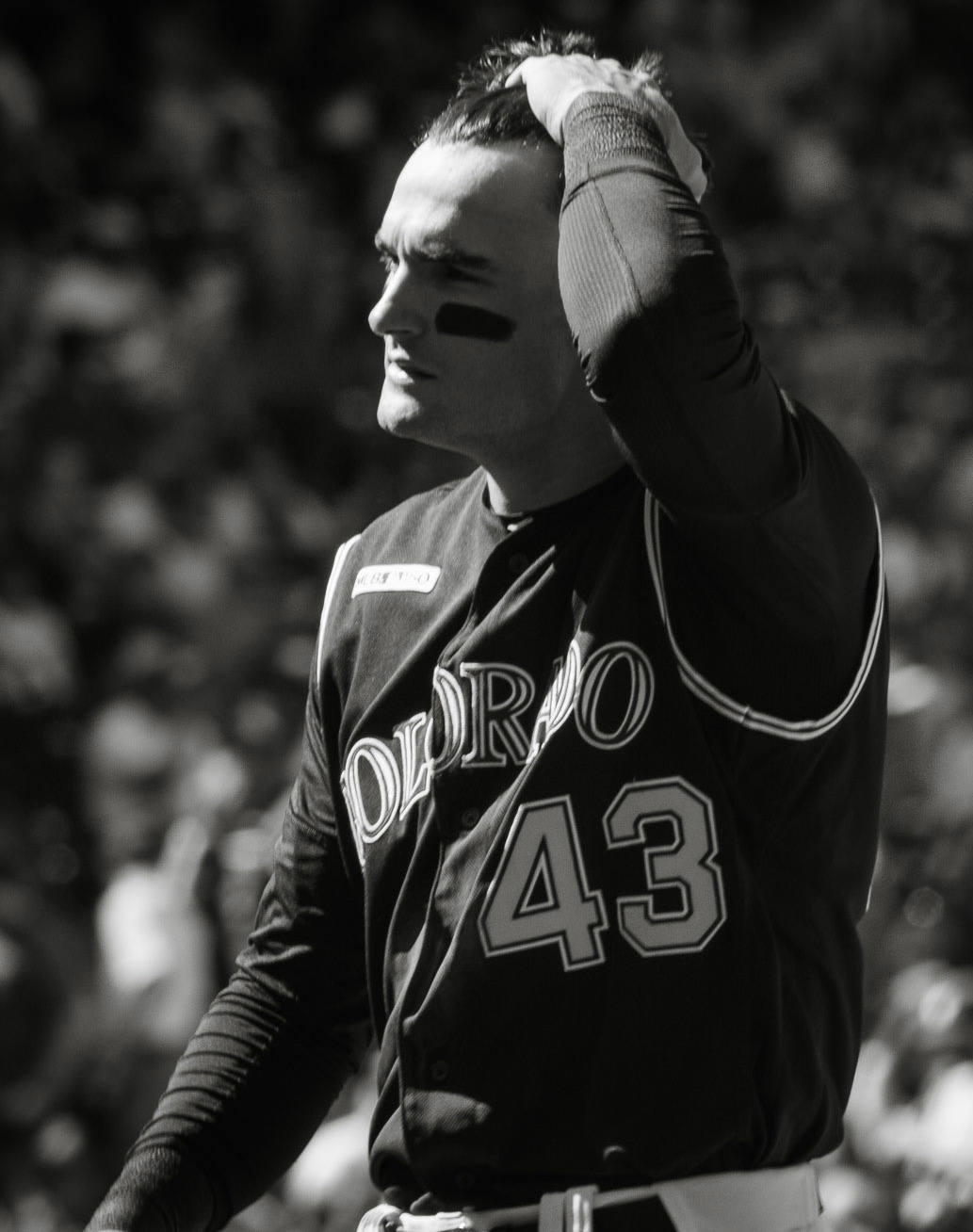
- Hilliard at Coors Field in 2019

KT Wiz – No. 34
- Outfielder
- Born: February 21, 1994 (age 32); Mansfield, Texas, U.S.
- Bats: Left Throws: Left

Professional debut
- MLB: August 27, 2019, for the Colorado Rockies
- KBO: March 28, 2026, for the KT Wiz

MLB statistics (through 2025 season)
- Batting average: .218
- Home runs: 44
- Runs batted in: 107

KBO statistics (through August 21, 2026)
- Batting average: .299
- Home runs: 30
- Runs batted in: 99
- Stats at Baseball Reference

Teams
- Colorado Rockies (2019–2022); Atlanta Braves (2023); Colorado Rockies (2024–2025); KT Wiz (2026–present)

Career highlights and awards
- KBO RBI leader (2026)

Samuel Beauman Hilliard (born February 21, 1994) is an American professional baseball outfielder for the KT Wiz of the KBO League. He has previously played in Major League Baseball (MLB) for the Colorado Rockies and Atlanta Braves.

== Amateur career ==
Hilliard attended Mansfield High School in Mansfield, Texas, where he played baseball and basketball. A stomach illness limited his strength. He started his college baseball career at Navarro College but played sparingly. He transferred to Crowder College, where he batted .290 and was 5–2 with a 2.14 earned run average as a pitcher. He was drafted by the Minnesota Twins in the 31st round of the 2014 Major League Baseball (MLB) draft out of Crowder but did not sign and attended Wichita State University. He batted .335 with 8 home runs while going 1–4 as a reliever in one year with the Shockers, after which he was drafted by the Colorado Rockies in the 15th round of the 2015 MLB draft.

== Professional career ==
=== Colorado Rockies ===
Hilliard made his professional debut with the Grand Junction Rockies and spent 2016 with the Asheville Tourists, 2017 with the Lancaster JetHawks and 2018 with the Hartford Yard Goats. He was named a midseason All-Star in 2016, 2017, and 2018. After the 2018 season, he played in the Arizona Fall League. The Rockies added him to their 40-man roster that November.

Hilliard began 2019 with the Albuquerque Isotopes. On August 27, the Rockies promoted Hilliard to the major leagues. He made his debut that night against Boston Red Sox and recorded his first major league hit, a two-run home run off Josh Smith. He batted .273 with 7 home runs in 27 games in his first season in the majors.

In the pandemic-shortened 2020 season, Hilliard had a .210/.272/.438 slash line with a high 36.8% strikeout percentage before being optioned down to the Rockies' alternate site in September after the club acquired Kevin Pillar.

Hilliard split 2021 between Colorado and Albuquerque, batting .215/.294/.463 in 81 games for the Rockies. He made his third consecutive opening day Rockies roster in 2022, but hit .184 in 70 games.

=== Atlanta Braves ===
On November 6, 2022, Hilliard was traded to the Atlanta Braves in exchange for Dylan Spain. On July 19, 2023, he was placed on the injured list with a right heel contusion. While on rehab assignment with the Triple-A Gwinnett Stripers, he re-injured his right heel and was transferred to the 60-day injured list on September 1. He played in 40 games for Atlanta, batting .236 with 6 home runs.

=== Colorado Rockies (second stint) ===
On November 1, 2023, Hilliard was claimed off waivers by the Baltimore Orioles.

The Rockies reacquired Hilliard on a waiver claim on February 28, 2024. However, on March 21, Hilliard was designated for assignment following the acquisition of Greg Jones. He cleared waivers and was sent outright to the Triple-A Albuquerque Isotopes on March 23. In 65 games for Albuquerque, he batted .288/.374/.542 with 14 home runs, 44 RBI, and 13 stolen bases. He set the Isotopes career record for home runs on May 1, his 67th home run with Albuquerque. On June 21, the Rockies selected Hilliard's contract, adding him to their active roster. In 58 games for Colorado, he slashed .239/.305/.507 with 10 home runs, 27 RBI, and five stolen bases.

Hilliard was designated for assignment by the Rockies on March 27, 2025. He cleared waivers and was sent outright to Triple-A on March 31. In 40 appearances for the Isotopes, he hit .288/.372/.538 with six home runs, 24 RBI, and five stolen bases. On May 30, the Rockies added him to their active roster. In 20 games for Colorado, he batted .196/.328/.412 with two home runs, three RBI, and two stolen bases. Hilliard was designated for assignment by the Rockies on July 1. He cleared waivers and was sent outright to Triple-A Albuquerque on July 4. Hilliard elected free agency on October 3.

=== KT Wiz ===
On December 3, 2025, Hilliard signed with the KT Wiz of the KBO League.

== Personal life ==
Hilliard is the youngest of three sons. Their mother, Tamara Hext, was Miss Texas in 1984 and fourth-runner-up in the Miss America pageant that year. His father, Jim Hilliard, played for the Texas Longhorns football team and was an orthopedic surgeon for 35 years. In March 2018, Jim Hilliard was diagnosed with amyotrophic lateral sclerosis (ALS). Hilliard has supported the ALS Therapy Development Institute and the creation on Lou Gehrig Day in MLB.
