= Peter Lambert (baseball) =

American baseball player (born 1997)

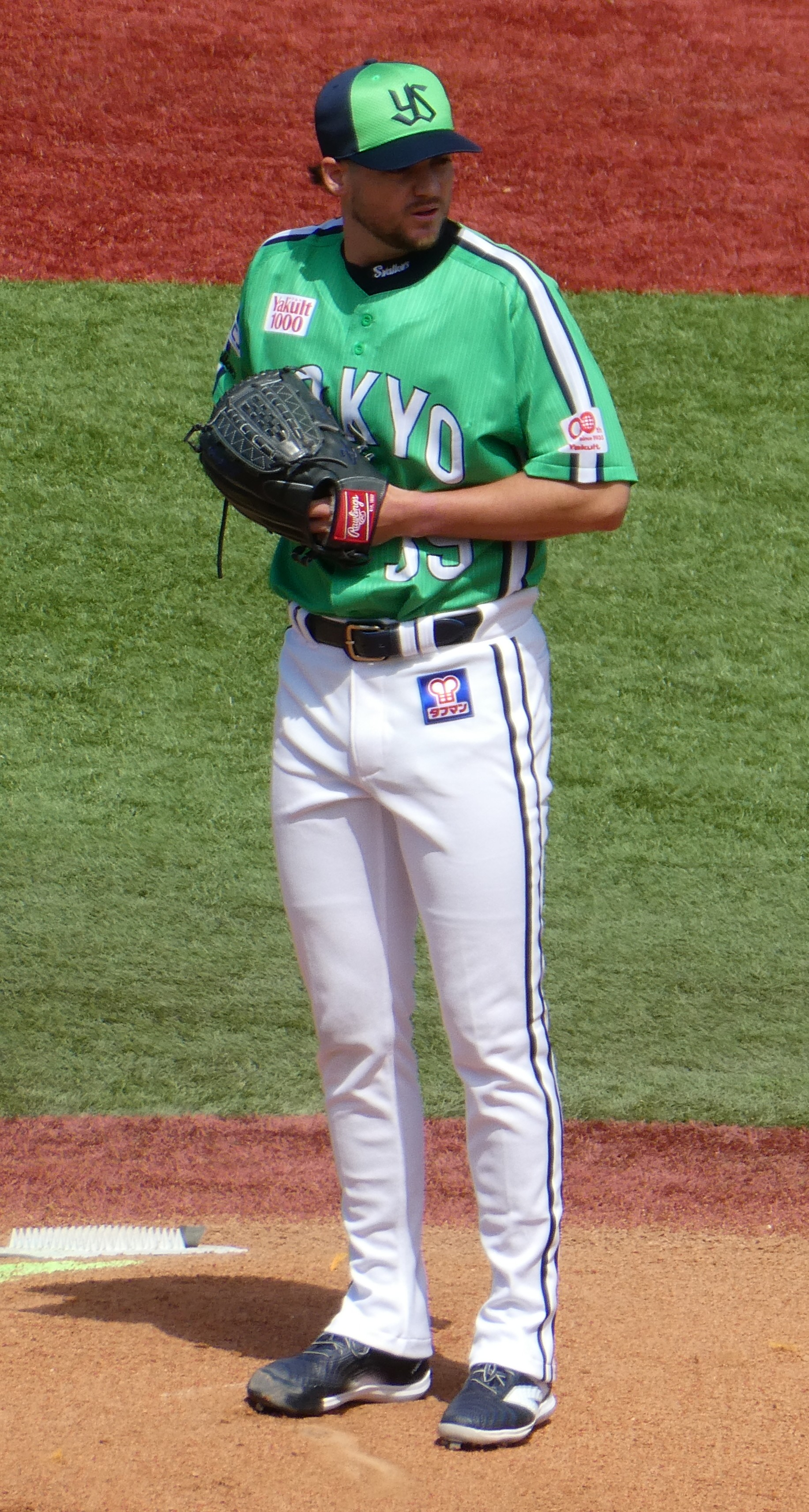
- Lambert with the Tokyo Yakult Swallows

Houston Astros – No. 38
- Pitcher
- Born: April 18, 1997 (age 29); San Dimas, California, U.S.
- Bats: Right Throws: Right

Professional debut
- MLB: June 6, 2019, for the Colorado Rockies
- NPB: April 5, 2025, for the Tokyo Yakult Swallows

MLB statistics (through 2026 season)
- Win–loss record: 16–29
- Earned run average: 5.32
- Strikeouts: 335

NPB statistics (through 2025 season)
- Win–loss record: 3–11
- Earned run average: 4.26
- Strikeouts: 104
- Stats at Baseball Reference

Teams
- Colorado Rockies (2019, 2021, 2023–2024); Tokyo Yakult Swallows (2025); Houston Astros (2026–present)

Peter Joseph Lambert (born April 18, 1997) is an American professional baseball pitcher for the Houston Astros of Major League Baseball (MLB). He has previously played in MLB for the Colorado Rockies, and in Nippon Professional Baseball (NPB) for the Tokyo Yakult Swallows.

== Amateur career ==
Lambert attended San Dimas High School in San Dimas, California. As a senior in 2015, he was the Los Angeles Times prep baseball player of the year after going 13–0 with a 0.34 earned run average (ERA). He committed to play college baseball for the UCLA Bruins.

== Professional career ==
=== Colorado Rockies ===
The Colorado Rockies selected Lambert in the second round of the 2015 Major League Baseball draft. He signed with the Rockies and made his professional debut with the Grand Junction Rockies. He pitched in eight games for Grand Junction, going 0-4 with a 3.45 ERA. Lambert spent 2016 with the Asheville Tourists, where he posted a 5-8 record with a 3.93 ERA. In 2017, Lambert played for the Lancaster JetHawks, pitching to a 9-8 record with a 4.17 ERA in a career high 142.1 innings pitched, and, in 2018, he split time between the Hartford Yard Goats and the Albuquerque Isotopes, going a combined 10-7 with a 3.28 ERA in 26 starts between both teams. He began 2019 back with Albuquerque.

Lambert was promoted to the major leagues by Colorado on June 6, 2019. He made his debut that same day at Wrigley Field versus the Chicago Cubs, giving up one run over seven innings while striking out nine, leading the Rockies to a 3-1 win. In 19 starts for Colorado, Lambert finished with a 3-7 record in 89 1/3 innings.

In late July 2020, Lambert underwent Tommy John surgery and would miss the 2020 season. On March 20, 2021, Lambert was placed on the 60-day injured list as he continued to recover from Tommy John surgery. On September 24, Lambert was activated from the injured list. He made two appearances for Colorado in 2021, surrendering 7 runs on 12 hits in 5 2/3 innings pitched.

In 2022, Lambert only made four appearances all year (all with Albuquerque) due to injury. He was optioned to Triple-A Albuquerque to begin the 2023 season. In 25 games (11 starts) for Colorado in 2023, Lambert logged a 3-7 record and 5.36 ERA with 71 strikeouts across 87 1/3 innings pitched.

Lambert made 28 appearances for Colorado in 2024, compiling a 2–5 record and 5.72 ERA with 50 strikeouts across 61 1/3 innings pitched. On October 18, 2024, Lambert was removed from the 40–man roster and sent outright to Triple–A Albuquerque, but rejected the assignment and elected free agency.

=== Tokyo Yakult Swallows ===
On December 14, 2024, Lambert signed a one–year, $1.6 million contract with the Tokyo Yakult Swallows of Nippon Professional Baseball. On April 29, 2025, Lambert tied an NPB record by throwing three wild pitches in one inning against the Yokohama DeNA BayStars. He made 21 appearances for the Swallows, compiling a 3-11 record and 4.26 ERA with 104 strikeouts across 116 1/3 innings pitched. On October 14, 2025, the Swallows announced that they would not retain Lambert for the 2026 season.

=== Houston Astros ===
On November 3, 2025, Lambert signed a minor league contract with the Houston Astros. On March 24, 2026, Lambert was released by Houston after triggering an opt-out clause in his contract. On March 27, Lambert re-signed with the Astros on a new minor league contract. He began the regular season with the Triple-A Sugar Land Space Cowboys. On April 17, the Astros selected Lambert's contract, adding him to their active roster. Lambert authored a breakout campaign in 2026, with career highs of 29 games started and 155 2/3 innings pitched (IP). Lambert went 8–10, 3.82 ERA, 154 strikeouts and 1.253 walks plus hits per inning pitched (WHIP). He made his playoff debut during the 2026 American League Wild Card Series in Game 2. Lambert started and worked three innings in Game 2, prior to being charged with the loss, though he walked two and did not yield any hits. The Astros were swept by the Chicago White Sox. Following the 2026 season, Lambert was conferred as team Pitcher of the Year by the Houston chapter of the Baseball Writers' Association of America (BBWAA).

== Personal life ==
Lambert's brother is Jimmy Lambert, who is also a professional baseball player and previously played for the Chicago White Sox.
