= Joe Rock (baseball) =

American baseball player (born 2000)

Athletics – No. 30
- Pitcher
- Born: July 29, 2000 (age 26); Sewickley, Pennsylvania, U.S.
- Bats: Right Throws: Left

MLB debut
- June 28, 2025, for the Tampa Bay Rays

MLB statistics (through 2026 season)
- Win–loss record: 0–1
- Earned run average: 4.00
- Strikeouts: 23
- Stats at Baseball Reference

Teams
- Tampa Bay Rays (2025); Chicago White Sox (2026); Athletics (2026–present)

Joseph Richard Rock (born July 29, 2000) is an American professional baseball pitcher for the Athletics of Major League Baseball (MLB). He has previously played in MLB for the Tampa Bay Rays and Chicago White Sox.

== Amateur career ==
Rock grew up in Aliquippa, Pennsylvania and attended Hopewell High School.

Rock played college baseball for the Ohio Bobcats. He pitched in 16 games with 11 starts as a freshman and went 2–4 with a 5.19 ERA and 41 strikeouts in 59 innings pitched. In 2019, he played collegiate summer baseball with the Wareham Gatemen of the Cape Cod Baseball League. In 2020, Rock was declared academically ineligible as a sophomore and redshirted the season. He started 14 games as a redshirt sophomore and pitched to an 8–3 record with a 2.33 ERA and 117 strikeouts.

== Professional career ==
=== Colorado Rockies ===
Rock was selected in the second round (68th overall) by the Colorado Rockies in the 2021 Major League Baseball draft. After signing with the team he was assigned to the rookie-level Arizona Complex League Rockies, where he had a 1.13 ERA and 11 strikeouts in eight innings pitched. Rock was assigned to the High-A Spokane Indians at the start of the 2022 season. In 22 starts split between Spokane and the Double-A Hartford Yard Goats, he accumulated a 7-8 record and 4.82 ERA with 120 strikeouts across 115 2/3 innings pitched.

Rock split the 2023 campaign between Hartford and the Triple-A Albuquerque Isotopes. In 20 starts for the two affiliates, he posted a cumulative 1-10 record and 4.66 ERA with 112 strikeouts across 92 2/3 innings pitched.

=== Tampa Bay Rays ===
On March 21, 2024, Rock was traded to the Tampa Bay Rays in exchange for Greg Jones. In 27 games (23 starts) for the Triple–A Durham Bulls, he logged a 7–8 record and 4.58 ERA with 132 strikeouts over 139 2/3 innings pitched. On November 18, the Rays added Rock to their 40-man roster to protect him from the Rule 5 draft.

Rock was optioned to Triple-A Durham to begin the 2025 season. In 15 appearances (14 starts) for the Bulls, he compiled a 3-5 record and 4.81 ERA with 63 strikeouts over 73 innings of work. On June 28, 2025, Rock was promoted to the major leagues for the first time. He made three appearances for Tampa Bay during his rookie campaign, recording a 2.35 ERA with 11 strikeouts across 7 2/3 innings pitched.

Rock was optioned to Triple-A Durham to begin the 2026 season. In 13 appearances for the Bulls, he posted a 1-1 record and 5.40 ERA with 27 strikeouts and one save over 15 innings of work.

=== Chicago White Sox ===
On May 19, 2026, Rock was traded to the Chicago White Sox in exchange for Oliver Dunn. He made four appearances for Chicago, posting an 0–1 record and 3.48 ERA with 12 strikeouts across 10 1/3 innings pitched. Rock was designated for assignment by the White Sox on August 14.

=== Athletics ===
On August 16, 2026, Rock was claimed off waivers by the Athletics.
