= Ryan Feltner =

American baseball player (born 1996)

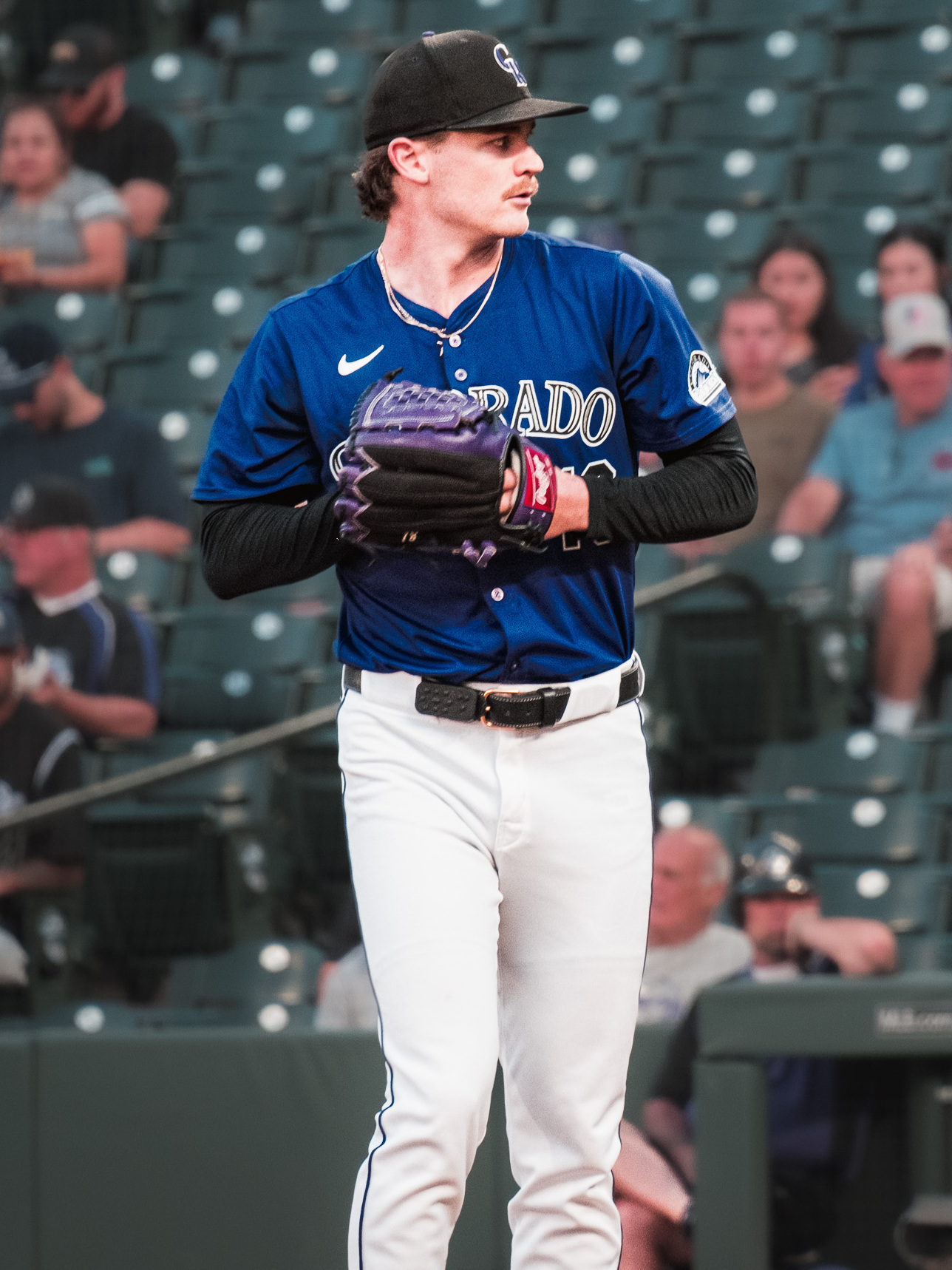
- Feltner with the Colorado Rockies in 2024

Colorado Rockies – No. 18
- Pitcher
- Born: September 2, 1996 (age 30); Orlando, Florida, U.S.
- Bats: Right Throws: Right

MLB debut
- September 5, 2021, for the Colorado Rockies

MLB statistics (through 2026 season)
- Win–loss record: 16–36
- Earned run average: 5.25
- Strikeouts: 383
- Stats at Baseball Reference

Teams
- Colorado Rockies (2021–present)

Ryan Donald Feltner (born September 2, 1996) is an American professional baseball pitcher for the Colorado Rockies of Major League Baseball (MLB). He made his MLB debut in 2021.

== Amateur career ==
Feltner attended Walsh Jesuit High School in Cuyahoga Falls, Ohio. As a senior in 2015, he was the Gatorade Baseball Player of the Year for Ohio and was the Plain Dealer Baseball Pitcher of the Year. Feltner was drafted by the Toronto Blue Jays in the 25th round of the 2015 Major League Baseball (MLB) draft, but did not sign and played college baseball at Ohio State University. In 2016, he played collegiate summer baseball with the Brewster Whitecaps of the Cape Cod Baseball League. He returned to the league in 2017 with the Bourne Braves, where he was named the league's outstanding relief pitcher and all-star. After his junior year with the Buckeyes, he was drafted by the Colorado Rockies in the fourth round of the 2018 MLB draft.

== Professional career ==
Feltner signed with the Rockies for a $434,700 signing bonus. He made his professional debut with the Grand Junction Rockies in 2018 and pitched 2019 with the Asheville Tourists. He did not play in a game in 2020 due to the cancellation of the minor league season because of the COVID-19 pandemic.

Feltner started 2021 with the Spokane Indians before being promoted to the Hartford Yard Goats on June 17. He had a 2.85 ERA in 13 starts for Hartford On September 5, Feltner was selected to the 40-man roster and promoted to the major leagues for the first time. That afternoon, he made his MLB debut, taking the loss after allowing 6 runs, including a leadoff home run by Ozzie Albies off Feltner's first major league pitch, in 2 2/3 innings in a 9–2 loss to the Atlanta Braves. He was sent down to the Triple-A Albuquerque Isotopes on September 18.

Feltner earned his first MLB win on May 30, 2022, allowing 1 run in 7 innings in a home win over the Miami Marlins. He made 20 appearances (19 starts) for Colorado in 2022, compiling a 4–9 record and 5.83 ERA with 84 strikeouts across 97 1/3 innings pitched in his rookie season. He also made 11 starts in Triple-A.

On May 13, 2023, in a start against the Philadelphia Phillies, Feltner was hit in the head by a 92.7 mile per hour line drive off the bat of Nick Castellanos. The incident resulted in Feltner suffering a skull fracture and concussion. He was placed on the 60-day injured list on May 29. He was activated from the injured list on September 19. In 10 starts for Colorado, Feltner registered a 2-4 record and 5.82 ERA with 38 strikeouts across 43 1/3 innings pitched.

Feltner made 30 starts for the Rockies in 2024, tied for the most on the team, with a 3–10 record, 4.49 ERA, and 138 strikeouts across 162 1/3 innings pitched.

Feltner began the 2025 season pitching out of Colorado's rotation, recording an 0–2 record and 4.75 ERA with 25 strikeouts over his first six starts. On May 2, Feltner was placed on the injured list due to back spasms; he was transferred to the 60-day injured list on June 15. He was activated from the injured list on July 4 and subsequently optioned to Triple-A. He made six starts in Albuquerque before a shoulder injury ended his season.

== Personal life ==
Feltner's brother, Riley, pitched in college for the Kent State Golden Flashes and is currently a baseball operations analyst for the Cleveland Guardians. Their father played college baseball for the UCF Golden Knights in 1985 and 1986 and grandfather played for the Eastern Kentucky Colonels.
