= Justin Lawrence (baseball) =

American baseball player (born 1994)

Free agent
- Pitcher
- Born: November 25, 1994 (age 31); Panama City, Panama
- Bats: Right Throws: Right

MLB debut
- April 29, 2021, for the Colorado Rockies

MLB statistics (through 2026 season)
- Win–loss record: 13–15
- Earned run average: 5.34
- Strikeouts: 254
- Stats at Baseball Reference

Teams
- Colorado Rockies (2021–2024); Pittsburgh Pirates (2025–2026); Minnesota Twins (2026); Washington Nationals (2026)

Justin Anthony Lawrence (born November 25, 1994) is a Panamanian professional baseball pitcher who is a free agent. He has previously played in Major League Baseball (MLB) for the Colorado Rockies, Pittsburgh Pirates, Minnesota Twins, and Washington Nationals.

== Amateur career ==
Lawrence was born in Panama in 1994 and moved to the United States at two years old.

Lawrence attended First Coast High School in Jacksonville, Florida and played college baseball at Jacksonville University and Daytona State College.

== Professional career ==
=== Colorado Rockies ===
Lawrence was drafted by the Colorado Rockies in the 12th round, with the 347th overall selection, of the 2015 Major League Baseball draft and signed.

After signing, Lawrence made his professional debut with the Boise Hawks before being reassigned to the Grand Junction Rockies. In 22 relief appearances between the two teams, he went 0–3 with an 8.39 ERA. In 2016, he played for both Boise and the Asheville Tourists where he pitched to a 4–6 record and 4.98 ERA in 49 relief appearances, and in 2017, he returned to Asheville, going 0–2 with a 1.65 ERA in in only 16 1/3 innings due to injury. Lawrence spent 2018 with the Lancaster JetHawks, pitching to an 0–2 record and 2.65 ERA with 62 strikeouts in 57 1/3 relief innings.

After the 2018 season, Lawrence played in the Arizona Fall League. The Rockies also added Lawrence to their 40-man roster after the 2018 season, in order to protect him from the Rule 5 draft. Lawrence spent the 2019 season with the Hartford Yard Goats and the Albuquerque Isotopes, going 1–5 with an 8.76 ERA, striking out 32 over 37 relief innings.

On January 17, 2020, Lawrence was suspended without pay for 80 games for testing positive for the performance enhancing substance dehydrochlormethyltestosterone. He did not play in a game in 2020 due to the cancellation of the Minor League Baseball season because of the COVID-19 pandemic.

On April 29, 2021, Lawrence was promoted to the major leagues for the first time. He made his MLB debut that day, pitching a scoreless 8th inning. In the game, he notched his first major league strikeout, punching out Arizona Diamondbacks infielder Eduardo Escobar. He posted an ERA of 8.64 in 19 games with 19 walks in 16 2/3 innings.

On October 3, 2022, Lawrence tossed a scoreless ninth inning against the Los Angeles Dodgers to earn his first career save. He ended the season with a 3-1 record in 38 games. He struck out 48 in 42 2/3 innings.

Heading into the 2023 season, Lawrence began as the setup man to closer Pierce Johnson. A few months into the season, Lawrence was named closer for the Rockies. He continued serving as the Rockies closer, recording 11 saves. He registered a 3.72 ERA in a career high 69 games.

Lawrence made 56 appearances for Colorado during the 2024 campaign, struggling to a 4-4 record and 6.49 ERA with 45 strikeouts and 2 saves across 59 2/3 innings pitched. On March 1, 2025, it was announced that the Rockies had placed Lawrence on waivers.

=== Pittsburgh Pirates ===
On March 3, 2025, Lawrence was claimed off waivers by the Pittsburgh Pirates. He recorded an 0.79 ERA with 15 strikeouts in 11 games before being placed on the injured list with elbow inflammation on April 24. Lawrence was transferred to the 60-day injured list on May 3. He was activated on September 12. Lawrence ended the year with a 1-0 record, 0.51 ERA, and 23 strikeouts in 17 2/3 innings.

Lawrence made 23 appearances for the Pirates during the 2026 campaign, compiling an 0-2 record and 5.32 ERA with 25 strikeouts over 22 innings of work. On May 29, 2026, Lawrence was designated for assignment by Pittsburgh.

=== Minnesota Twins ===
On June 1, 2026, Lawrence was traded to the Minnesota Twins in exchange for cash. He made seven appearances for the Twins, but struggled to an 0-1 record and 18.00 ERA with 12 strikeouts over six innings of work. Lawrence was designated for assignment by the Twins on June 21.

=== Washington Nationals ===
On June 24, 2026, The Washington Nationals claimed Lawrence off waivers from the Twins. Lawrence recorded a tenth-inning save against the Baltimore Orioles in his Nationals debut on June 27, becoming the first Washington pitcher since one of his pitching coaches, Nationals assistant Sean Doolittle—nearly nine years prior—to record a save in his first appearance with the team. He made seven appearances for Washington, recording a 4.26 ERA with six strikeouts over 6 1/3 innings pitched. Lawrence was designated for assignment by the Nationals on July 21. He cleared waivers and was sent outright to the Triple–A Rochester Red Wings on July 23. He elected free agency on October 7.
