= Tanner Gordon =

American baseball player (born 1997)

Colorado Rockies – No. 29
- Pitcher
- Born: October 26, 1997 (age 28); Champaign, Illinois, U.S.
- Bats: Left Throws: Right

MLB debut
- July 7, 2024, for the Colorado Rockies

MLB statistics (through 2026 season)
- Win–loss record: 7–20
- Earned run average: 6.88
- Strikeouts: 173
- Stats at Baseball Reference

Teams
- Colorado Rockies (2024–present)

Tanner Robert Gordon (born October 26, 1997) is an American professional baseball pitcher for the Colorado Rockies of Major League Baseball (MLB). Gordon played college baseball for the John A. Logan College Volunteers and Indiana Hoosiers. He was selected by the Atlanta Braves in the 6th round of the 2019 MLB draft. Atlanta traded him to Colorado in 2023, and he made his MLB debut in 2024.

== Amateur career ==
Gordon played baseball at Champaign Central High School in Champaign, Illinois, helping the team with three conference titles. Nicknamed "Big Oak" in high school, he was named the News-Gazette "All-Area performer" in 2016, his senior year.

After high school, Gordon played his first two seasons of college baseball at John A. Logan College, a junior college in Carterville, Illinois. He had a win-loss record of 6–0 in 14 games played and 8 games started in his freshman season, with a 3.44 ERA, 52 strikeouts, and 11 walks in 49^{2}/_{3} innings pitched while giving up only 2 home runs. In his sophomore season at John A. Logan, Gordon went 9–2 and started all 12 of the games he appeared in, finishing with a 2.06 ERA and 104 strikeouts while giving up 20 walks and 3 home runs in 70 innings pitched. In two seasons at John A. Logan, Gordon had a K/9 rate of 11.73, a BB/9 rate of 2.63, and a HR/9 rate of 0.38.

After his sophomore season, Gordon transferred to and played for the Indiana Hoosiers for his junior season in 2019, going 6–6 with a 3.81 ERA with 90 strikeouts and 19 walks in 87 1/3 innings pitched.

== Professional career ==
=== Atlanta Braves ===
Gordon was drafted by the Atlanta Braves in the 6th round, with the 187th overall selection, of the 2019 Major League Baseball draft. He made his professional debut with the rookie-level Danville Braves. He was 2–1 with a 2.22 ERA as a reliever. He did not play in a game in 2020 due to the cancellation of the minor league season because of the COVID-19 pandemic.

Gordon returned to action in 2021 with the Single-A Augusta GreenJackets and High-A Rome Braves. In 22 games (21 starts) between the two affiliates, he compiled a 6–8 record and 3.90 ERA with 109 strikeouts across 108 1/3 innings pitched. In 2022, Gordon made 25 starts split between Rome, where he was the South Atlantic League pitcher of the month in April, and the Double-A Mississippi Braves, with a 12–7 record, 4.64 ERA, and 133 strikeouts over 120 1/3 innings of work. Gordon began the 2023 campaign with Mississippi and was later promoted to the Triple-A Gwinnett Stripers, for whom he pitched to a 1–4 record and 8.28 ERA with 21 strikeouts over 6 games (5 starts).

=== Colorado Rockies ===
On July 24, 2023, Gordon and Victor Vodnik were traded to the Colorado Rockies in exchange for reliever Pierce Johnson. Gordon finished the season with the Double-A Hartford Yard Goats and Triple-A Albuquerque Isotopes. He had a 2–2 record, 5.96 ERA, and 21 strikeouts in 4 starts for Hartford and posted a 1–1 record and 4.31 ERA with 34 strikeouts over 6 starts for Albuquerque.

Gordon began the 2024 season with Albuquerque. On July 7, he was added to the 40-man roster and promoted to the major leagues for the first time. Gordon made his debut later that day against the Kansas City Royals at Coors Field. He pitched a perfect first inning, striking out the first two batters he faced, Adam Frazier and Bobby Witt Jr. However, Gordon gave up three straight hits to begin the second inning, capped by an RBI single to Freddy Fermin. Two batters later, Maikel García hit a three-run home run, giving the Royals a 4–0 lead. Gordon gave up a solo home run to MJ Melendez in the 7th inning and was ultimately pulled after pitching 6 1/3 innings; he allowed 5 earned runs and 8 hits while striking out 4 batters and allowing no walks. The Rockies lost the game 10–1, with Gordon taking the loss. In 8 starts for Colorado, Gordon struggled to an 0–6 record and 8.65 ERA with 26 strikeouts across 34 1/3 innings pitched.

Gordon was optioned to Triple-A Albuquerque to begin the 2025 season, returning to the majors in May. On May 23, Gordon recorded his first career win after allowing two runs over six innings against the New York Yankees. He went on the injured list in early June, returning to the majors in late July. Gordon made 15 starts for Colorado during the regular season, leading the team in wins (with six) and recording a 6.33 ERA with 62 strikeouts across 75 1/3 innings pitched.

Gordon was optioned to Triple-A Albuquerque to begin the 2026 season.
