= Jaden Hill =

American baseball player (born 1999)

Colorado Rockies – No. 0
- Pitcher
- Born: December 22, 1999 (age 26); Ashdown, Arkansas, U.S.
- Bats: Right Throws: Right

MLB debut
- September 7, 2024, for the Colorado Rockies

MLB statistics (through 2026 season)
- Win–loss record: 2–5
- Earned run average: 4.52
- Strikeouts: 77
- Stats at Baseball Reference

Teams
- Colorado Rockies (2024–present)

Kenneth Jaden Hill (born December 22, 1999) is an American professional baseball pitcher for the Colorado Rockies of Major League Baseball (MLB). He played college baseball for the LSU Tigers and was selected by the Rockies in the second round of the 2021 Major League Baseball draft. He made his MLB debut in 2024.

== Amateur career ==
Hill attended Ashdown High School in Ashdown, Arkansas, where he played baseball and football. In July 2017, he was invited and accepted an invitation to play in the Under Armour All-America Baseball Game at Wrigley Field. In 2018, his senior year, he went 7–0 with a 0.51 earned run average (ERA) and batted .540 with 11 home runs, winning the Arkansas Gatorade Player of the Year Award. He was selected by the St. Louis Cardinals in the 38th round of the 2018 Major League Baseball draft but did not sign, and instead attended Louisiana State University (LSU) to play college baseball for the LSU Tigers.

In 2019, Hill's freshman season at LSU, he made two starts and pitched two innings before undergoing collarbone surgery, forcing him to miss the remainder of the season. He was named the SEC Freshman of the Week in mid-February 2019 after pitching five scoreless innings with eight strikeouts in his debut against the Air Force Academy. Prior to the 2020 season, he was named an All-American by Collegiate Baseball Newspaper. He returned healthy in 2020, and began pitching out of the bullpen. He threw 11 2/3 scoreless innings before the season was ended early due to the COVID-19 pandemic. In April 2021, Hill suffered a torn ulnar collateral ligament in his right elbow that required Tommy John surgery, and was ruled out for the remainder of the season. Over seven starts before the injury, he went 2–3 with a 6.67 ERA and 25 strikeouts over 29 2/3 innings.

== Professional career ==
The Colorado Rockies selected Hill in the second round, with the 44th overall selection of the 2021 Major League Baseball draft. He signed for a $1.7 million signing bonus.

Hill returned to throwing live batting practice in mid-June 2022. Hill made his professional debut in July with the Rookie-level Arizona Complex League Rockies and after seven starts was promoted to the Fresno Grizzlies of the Single-A California League. Over 17 2/3 innings between the two teams, he had a 3.06 ERA, 25 strikeouts, and six walks. For the 2023 season, Hill was assigned to the Spokane Indians of the High-A Northwest League. Over 16 starts, Hill went 0–9 with a 9.48 ERA, 57 strikeouts, and 25 walks over 43 2/3 innings. He was selected to play in the Arizona Fall League for the Salt River Rafters after the season.

Hill was assigned to the Hartford Yard Goats of the Double-A Eastern League to open the 2024 season. He posted a 3.52 ERA with 56 strikeouts and six saves in 34 appearances before he was promoted to the Albuquerque Isotopes of the Triple-A Pacific Coast League, where in seven innings he gave up eight earned runs. On September 5, Hill was selected to the 40-man roster and promoted to the major leagues for the first time. In nine appearances for the Rockies, Hill posted a 5.06 ERA with 6 strikeouts across 10 2/3 innings pitched.

Hill was optioned to Albuquerque to begin the 2025 season. He pitched three games for the Rockies in April before he was optioned back to Albuquerque, and then rejoined the Rockies for good in late July. On August 2, Hill recorded his first MLB win, tossing a scoreless inning of relief against the Pittsburgh Pirates. In his rookie season, he was 1–1 with a 3.38 ERA, 31 strikeouts, and 12 walks in 29 1/3 innings.

Hill was named to Colorado's 2026 Opening Day roster to start the season. On June 24, he was placed on the injured list with right shoulder tendonitis. Hill was activated on August 19 following two rehab appearances with Albuquerque. He made 46 relief appearances for the Rockies in 2026 and ended the season with a 1–4 record, a 5.22 ERA, and 40 strikeouts in 39 2/3 innings.

== See also ==
- List of baseball players who underwent Tommy John surgery
