= Brendan Rodgers (baseball) =

American baseball player (born 1996)

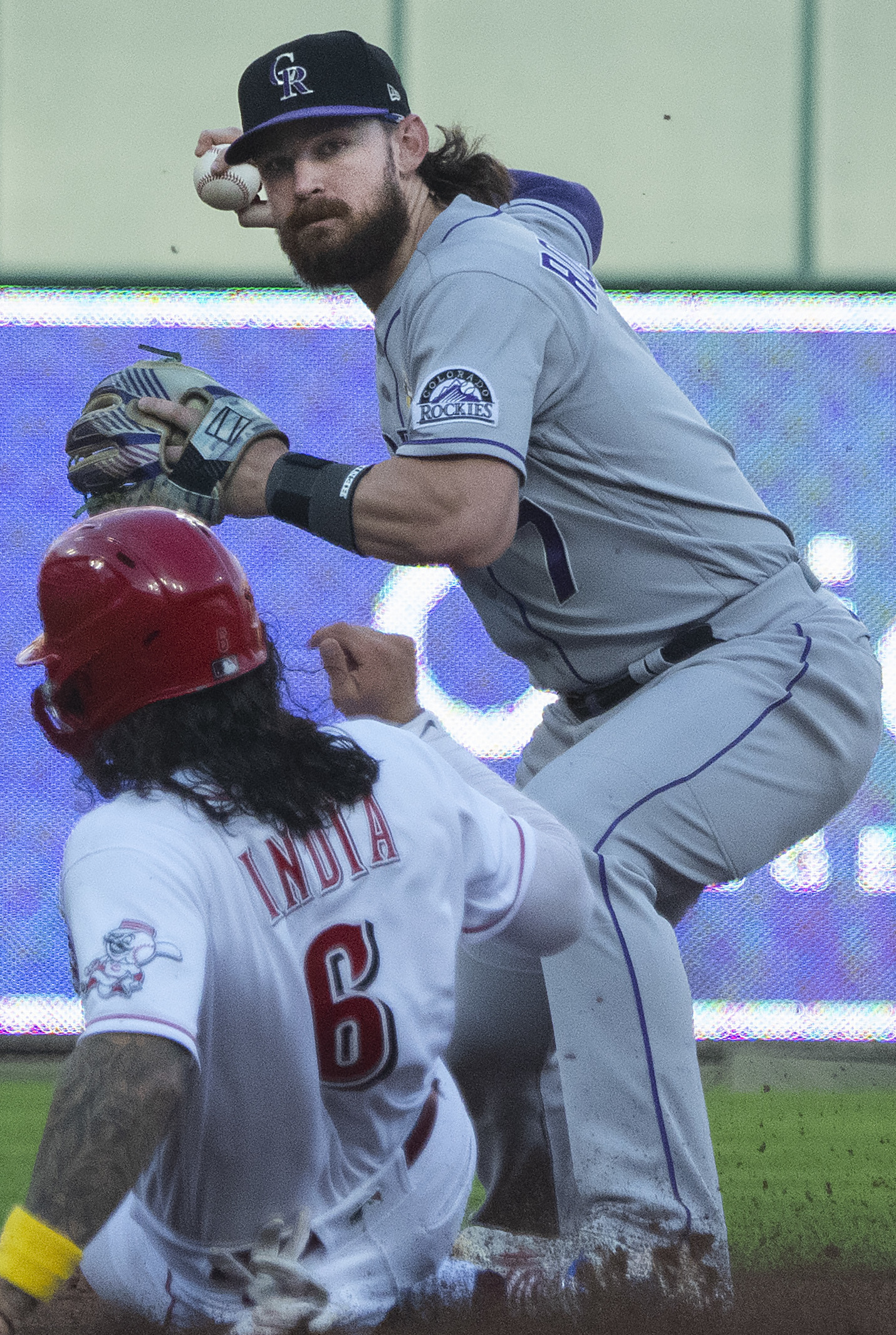
- Rodgers with the Rockies in 2022

Boston Red Sox
- Second baseman
- Born: August 9, 1996 (age 29); Winter Park, Florida, U.S.
- Bats: Right Throws: Right

MLB debut
- May 17, 2019, for the Colorado Rockies

MLB statistics (through 2025 season)
- Batting average: .261
- Home runs: 47
- Runs batted in: 208
- Stats at Baseball Reference

Teams
- Colorado Rockies (2019–2024); Houston Astros (2025)

Career highlights and awards
- Gold Glove Award (2022)

Brendan Austin Rodgers (born August 9, 1996) is an American professional baseball second baseman in the Boston Red Sox organization. He has previously played in Major League Baseball (MLB) for the Colorado Rockies and Houston Astros. He was drafted third overall by the Rockies in the 2015 MLB draft.

== Early life ==
Brendan Austin Rodgers was born on August 9, 1996, in Winter Park, Florida, to Greg and Julie Rodgers, owners of an apparel and promotions company. Rodgers' father and his two brothers both played soccer, and he only began playing baseball at the urging of a neighbor. He grew up playing on youth baseball teams with Bo Bichette, the son of Major League Baseball (MLB) player Dante Bichette, and when Rodgers was five years old, the elder Bichette told his parents that he had "a serious future in baseball".

Rodgers attended Lake Mary High School in Lake Mary, Florida, and played for the school's baseball team. After playing as a second baseman during his first year, Rodgers switched to shortstop for the next three seasons. During his senior season at Lake Mary, Rodgers batted .368 with eight home runs and 23 runs batted in (RBI). Outside of his high school team, Rodgers played for the Orlando Scorpions, a traveling team previously attended by Chris Sale, Zack Greinke, and Jonathan Lucroy.

== Professional career ==
=== Colorado Rockies ===
==== Minor leagues ====
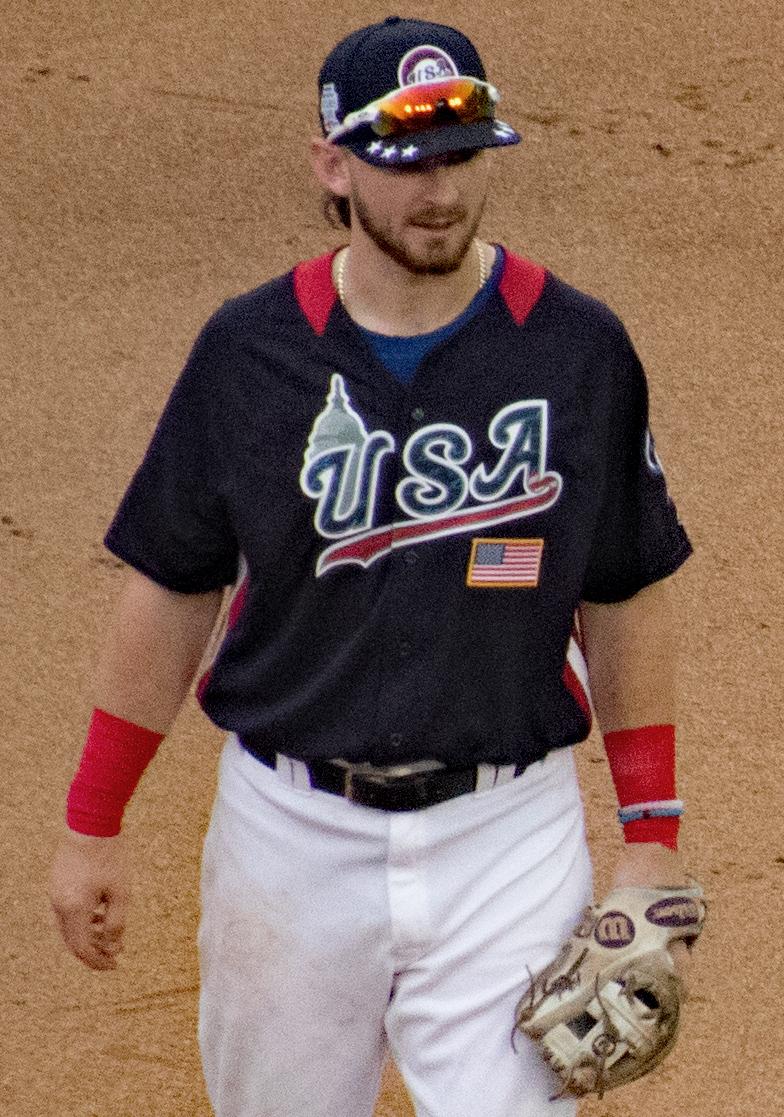
Rodgers at the 2018 All-Star Futures Game

The Colorado Rockies selected Rodgers out of high school with the third overall pick of the 2015 MLB draft. He had previously committed to playing college baseball for the Florida State Seminoles, but he signed with the Rockies on June 17 for a $5.5 million signing bonus. After signing, Rodgers began his professional baseball career with the Grand Junction Rockies, a Rookie-level team in the Pioneer League. He played there for the entire 2015 season, batting .273 with three home runs and 20 RBI in 37 games and 143 at bats. Rodgers was promoted to the Low-A Asheville Tourists for the 2016 season, where he impressed manager Warren Schaeffer by batting .358 with seven home runs and 27 RBI through the first month of the South Atlantic League season. This included his first career grand slam on May 7 during a 16–7 Asheville victory over the Delmarva Shorebirds. He played 110 games in Asheville, batting .281 with 19 home runs and 73 RBI in 442 at-bats.

Rodgers spent 2017 with both the Lancaster JetHawks and the Hartford Yard Goats, batting a combined .336 with 18 home runs, 64 RBI, and a .940 OPS in 89 games between both teams. In 2018, he played for both Hartford and the Albuquerque Isotopes, compiling a combined .268 batting average with 17 home runs and 67 RBI in 114 games. Rodgers opened the 2019 season back with Albuquerque.

==== Major leagues ====
On May 17, 2019, Rodgers was promoted to the major leagues for the first time. He made his major league debut that night versus the Philadelphia Phillies. In 25 games for Colorado during his rookie campaign, Rodgers batted .224/.272/.250 with seven RBI. Rodgers only appeared in 7 games in the pandemic shortened 2020 season for the Rockies, before landing on the injured list due to lingering problems in his right shoulder.

On March 19, 2021, Rodgers suffered a strained hamstring, requiring at least a month of recovery. In 102 games for the Rockies, he slashed .284/.328/.470 with career-highs in home runs (15) and RBI (51).

On June 1, 2022, Rodgers enjoyed his first career three home run game. His third home run in the contest was a walk-off home run off of Cole Sulser to defeat the Miami Marlins, 13-12. In 137 appearances for the Rockies, Rodgers batted .266/.325/.408 with 13 home runs and 63 RBI. He also led the NL in double plays grounded into (25).

On February 28, 2023, in a spring training game against the Texas Rangers, Rodgers suffered a dislocated left shoulder that jeopardized the start to his season. After recovering, he played in 46 contests for Colorado, hitting .258/.313/.388 with four home runs and 20 RBI.

In 2024, Rodgers batted .267/.314/.407 with 13 home runs and 67 RBI, and led MLB in ground ball percentage, at 56.1%. Rodgers was non-tendered by the Rockies on November 22, 2024, making him a free agent.

=== Houston Astros ===
On February 18, 2025, Rodgers signed a minor league contract with the Houston Astros. On March 27, the Astros selected Rodgers' contract after he made the team's Opening Day roster. In his first 43 games for Houston, he hit .191 with two home runs and 11 RBI. On July 19, while on rehab assignment with the Triple-A Sugar Land Space Cowboys, Rodgers suffered a concussion and nasal fracture after colliding with teammate Edwin Díaz. He was transferred to the 60-day injured list the following day.

=== Boston Red Sox ===
On February 5, 2026, Rodgers signed a minor league contract with the Boston Red Sox. On March 3, manager Alex Cora announced that Rodgers would "likely" require right shoulder surgery due to an injury suffered during a spring training game against the Minnesota Twins. On March 25, Rodgers was released by Boston. Three days later, he re-signed with the organization on a two-year minor league contract. On May 6, he was officially placed on the full season injured-list officially ending his season without appearing in a game.
