= Greg Jones (baseball, born 1998) =

American baseball player (born 1998)

Free agent
- Outfielder
- Born: March 7, 1998 (age 28); Cary, North Carolina, U.S.
- Bats: Switch Throws: Right

MLB debut
- June 6, 2024, for the Colorado Rockies

MLB statistics (through 2026 season)
- Batting average: .100
- Home Runs: 1
- Runs batted in: 2
- Stats at Baseball Reference

Teams
- Colorado Rockies (2024); Chicago White Sox (2025); Milwaukee Brewers (2026)

Gregory Jones Jr. (born March 7, 1998) is an American professional baseball outfielder who is a free agent. He has previously played in Major League Baseball (MLB) for the Colorado Rockies, Chicago White Sox, and Milwaukee Brewers.

== Early life ==
Jones was born in Cary, North Carolina. He is the son of Tammy and Greg Jones. Jones attended Cary High School.

== Amateur career ==
As a senior at Cary High School, he batted .429 with 18 stolen bases. He was ranked sixth in North Carolina and 133rd nationally by Perfect Game. He was selected by the Baltimore Orioles in the 17th round of the 2017 Major League Baseball draft, but did not sign. He instead chose to attend the University of North Carolina Wilmington where he played college baseball.

In 2018, as a freshman with the UNC Wilmington Seahawks, Jones played and started sixty games, batting .278 with four home runs, 21 runs batted in (RBIs), and 16 stolen bases. He played collegiate summer baseball for the Chatham Anglers of the Cape Cod Baseball League after the season, hitting .242 in 132 at-bats. In 2019, his sophomore year, he hit .341 with five home runs, 36 RBIs, and 42 stolen bases in 63 games, and was named the Colonial Athletic Association Player of the Year.

== Professional career ==
=== Tampa Bay Rays ===
The Tampa Bay Rays selected Jones in the first round, with the 22nd overall selection, of the 2019 Major League Baseball draft. He signed with the Rays for $3 million. Jones made his professional debut with the Hudson Valley Renegades of the Low–A New York–Penn League. Over 48 games, he slashed .335/.413/.461 with one home run, 24 RBIs, and 19 stolen bases. Jones did not play in a game in 2020 due to the cancellation of the minor league season because of the COVID-19 pandemic.

Jones began the 2021 season with the Bowling Green Hot Rods of the High-A East and was promoted to the Montgomery Biscuits of the Double-A South in August. He missed time during the season due to a quadriceps injury. Over 72 games between the two clubs, he slashed .270/.366/.482 with 14 home runs, forty RBIs, and 34 stolen bases. He opened the 2022 season back with Montgomery. In 79 games for Montgomery, Jones hit .238/.318/.392 with 8 home runs, 40 RBI, and 37 stolen bases. On November 15, 2022, the Rays added Jones to their 40-man roster to protect him from the Rule 5 draft.

The Rays optioned Jones to the Triple-A Durham Bulls to begin the 2023 season. On 71 games split between Triple–A Durham and Double–A Montgomery, he hit a cumulative .244/.318/.432 with 10 home runs, 35 RBI, and 24 stolen bases. On September 16, 2023, Jones was placed on the 60–day injured list with a hamstring injury, ending his season. Jones was optioned to Triple–A Durham to begin the 2024 season.

=== Colorado Rockies ===
On March 21, 2024, Jones was traded to the Colorado Rockies in exchange for Joe Rock. He was optioned to the Triple–A Albuquerque Isotopes upon being acquired. On June 6, Jones was promoted to the major leagues for the first time. Although primarily a shortstop in the minor leagues, Jones only played right field. In 6 games for Colorado during his rookie campaign, he went 1-for-5 (.200) with 1 home run, 1 RBI, and 1 walk.

Jones was optioned to the Triple-A Albuquerque Isotopes to begin the 2025 season.

=== Chicago White Sox ===
On March 26, 2025, Jones was claimed off waivers by the Chicago White Sox and was subsequently optioned to the Triple-A Charlotte Knights. He played in three games for the White Sox, recording no hits and one stolen base across two plate appearances. Jones was released by Chicago on May 10.

=== Houston Astros ===
On May 20, 2025, Jones signed a minor league contract with the Houston Astros. He made five appearances for the rookie-level Florida Complex League Astros and Single-A Fayetteville Woodpeckers during the remainder of the season, going 4-for-9 (.444) with three RBI. Jones elected free agency following the season on November 6.

=== Milwaukee Brewers ===
On December 11, 2025, Jones signed a minor league contract with the Milwaukee Brewers. He was assigned to the Triple-A Nashville Sounds to begin the regular season, batting .317 with seven RBI and seven stolen bases across 13 games. On April 14, 2026, the Brewers selected Jones' contract, adding him to their active roster. He made 11 appearances for Milwaukee, going 2-for-21 (.095) with one RBI and one stolen base. On May 4, Jones was designated for assignment by the Brewers. He cleared waivers and was sent outright to Triple-A Nashville on May 8. On July 7, the Brewers added Jones back to their active roster. He made one appearance for the team, going 0-for-2, before he was designated for assignment again on July 12. Jones elected free agency after clearing waivers on July 16.

=== Chicago Cubs ===
On July 21, 2026, Jones signed a minor league contract with the Chicago Cubs. In 31 games with Triple-A Iowa Cubs he batted .188/.287/.267 with 2 home runs, 6 RBIs and 10 stolen bases. He elected free agency on November 2.
