= Austin Kitchen =

American baseball player (born 1997)

Seattle Mariners
- Pitcher
- Born: February 11, 1997 (age 29); Pittsburgh, Pennsylvania, U.S.
- Bats: Left Throws: Left

MLB debut
- July 30, 2024, for the Miami Marlins

MLB statistics (through 2024 season)
- Win–loss record: 0–1
- Earned run average: 14.14
- Strikeouts: 4
- Stats at Baseball Reference

Teams
- Miami Marlins (2024)

Austin Christopher Kitchen (born February 11, 1997) is an American professional baseball pitcher in the Seattle Mariners organization. He has previously played in Major League Baseball (MLB) for the Miami Marlins.

== Career ==
=== Early career ===
Kitchen attended Mt. Lebanon High School in Mt. Lebanon, Pennsylvania and played for the school's baseball team. He enrolled at Coastal Carolina University, where he played college baseball for the Coastal Carolina Chanticleers from 2016 through 2019. Kitchen was a member of the 2016 College World Series champions. That year, he was named a freshman All American by Louisville Slugger. In 2017, he played collegiate summer baseball for the Cotuit Kettleers of the Cape Cod Baseball League. He missed the entire 2018 season after tearing the anterior cruciate ligament in his right knee while working out in a weight room. He returned to the Chanticleers in 2019, leading the team in hits and runs allowed and sharing the team lead with 6 wins. He did not pitch in college in 2020.

After college, Kitchen was not selected in the shortened 2020 Major League Baseball draft and spent the summer with the Steel City Slammin' Sammies of the independent Washington League. In nine games, he recorded a 1.50 earned run average (ERA) with 11 strikeouts across 12 innings pitched. On February 9, 2021, Kitchen signed with the Washington Wild Things of the independent Frontier League.

=== Colorado Rockies ===
On April 20, 2021, Kitchen signed a minor league contract with the Colorado Rockies organization. He pitched 19 games for the Single-A Fresno Grizzlies, compiling a 4.97 ERA with 38 strikeouts across 50 2/3 innings. Kitchen started 2022 with the High-A Spokane Indians and was promoted to the Double-A Hartford Yard Goats at the end of July. In 36 total games, he posted a cumulative 5–2 record and 3.32 ERA with 71 strikeouts across 81 1/3 innings pitched. Kitchen spent the 2023 season back with Hartford, also making two appearances for the Triple-A Albuquerque Isotopes. In 43 games out of the bullpen for Hartford, he recorded a 3.62 ERA with 54 strikeouts and 3 saves across 59 2/3 innings of work.

Kitchen began 2024 with Hartford and was promoted to Albuquerque after 5 games. In 18 games for the Isotopes, Kitchen registered a 3.65 ERA with 18 strikeouts.

On June 22, 2024, Kitchen was selected to the 40-man roster and promoted to the major leagues for the first time. He did not make an appearance for the Rockies before he was designated for assignment the following day to make way for Kyle Freeland, becoming, for a time, a phantom ballplayer.

=== Miami Marlins ===
On June 25, 2024, Kitchen was claimed off waivers by the Miami Marlins and optioned to the Triple-A Jacksonville Jumbo Shrimp. The Marlins promoted Kitchen to the major leagues on July 26, but he was optioned to back to Jacksonville the next day, without pitching for Miami. He was promoted once more on July 30. He made his major league debut that day, allowing 3 runs in 2 innings in a loss to the Tampa Bay Rays. Kitchen made four appearances for the Marlins, with a 14.14 ERA, one loss, and four strikeouts over seven innings. He was designated for assignment by Miami on September 7.

=== Seattle Mariners ===
On September 9, 2024, Kitchen was claimed off waivers by the Seattle Mariners. He was optioned to the Triple-A Tacoma Rainiers, where he pitched four times, posting an unsightly 14.73 ERA in 3 2/3 innings. His combined pitching line for three Triple-A teams in 2024 was a 6–1 record with a 4.30 ERA and 27 strikeouts in 44 innings.

On January 13, 2025, the Mariners designated Kitchen for assignment. He cleared waivers and was sent outright to Triple-A Tacoma on January 16. On April 21, 2026, he was placed on the full-season injured list ruling him out for the entire season.
