= Michael Toglia =

American baseball player (born 1998)

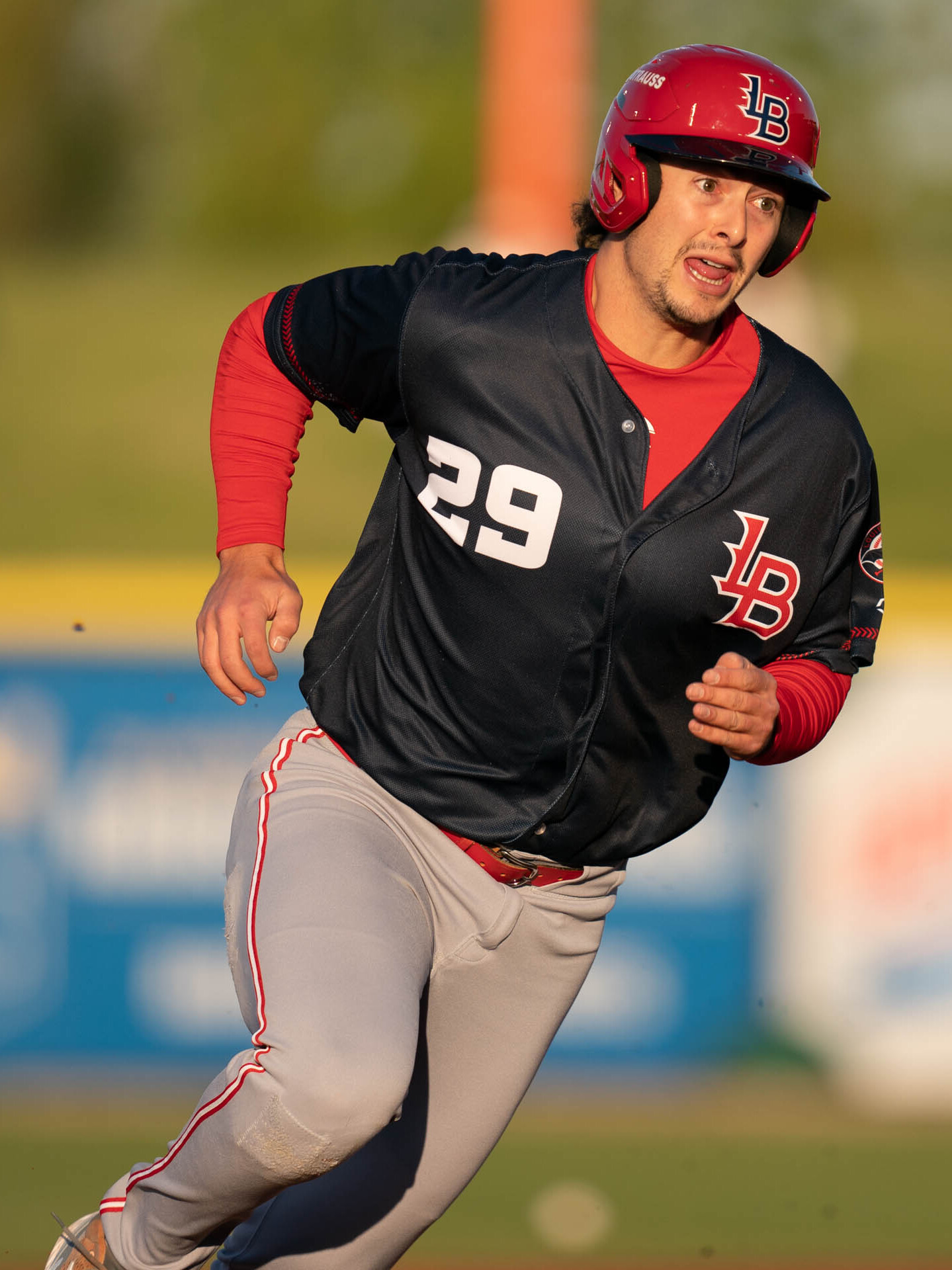
- Toglia with the Louisville Bats in 2026

Seattle Mariners
- First baseman / Outfielder
- Born: August 16, 1998 (age 28); Phoenix, Arizona, U.S.
- Bats: Switch Throws: Left

MLB debut
- August 30, 2022, for the Colorado Rockies

MLB statistics (through 2026 season)
- Batting average: .198
- Home runs: 42
- Runs batted in: 109
- Stats at Baseball Reference

Teams
- Colorado Rockies (2022–2025); Cincinnati Reds (2026)

Michael Anthony Toglia (TOH-lee-uh; born August 16, 1998) is an American professional baseball first baseman and outfielder for the Seattle Mariners of Major League Baseball (MLB). He has previously played in MLB for the Colorado Rockies and Cincinnati Reds. Toglia played three years of college baseball at UCLA. He was selected by the Rockies in the first round of the 2019 MLB draft. He played in their minor league system for three years before making his MLB debut in 2022.

== Amateur career ==
Toglia attended Gig Harbor High School in Gig Harbor, Washington. As a senior in 2016, he hit .316 with four home runs and 21 RBIs along with pitching to a 1.00 ERA in 42 innings.

After his senior year, he was drafted by the Colorado Rockies in the 35th round of the 2016 Major League Baseball draft. However, he did not sign and instead chose to attend the University of California, Los Angeles (UCLA) to play college baseball for the UCLA Bruins.

During the summer before college, he played in the West Coast League (WCL) for the Wenatchee AppleSox and was named the league's most valuable player as well as to the All-WCL team after he batted .306 with seven home runs and 40 RBIs.

In 2017, as a freshman at UCLA, Toglia hit .261 with eight home runs and 33 RBIs in 56 games. He received All-Pac-12 Honorable Mention and was named a Freshman All-American by Collegiate Baseball. After the 2017 season, he played collegiate summer baseball in the Cape Cod Baseball League for the Cotuit Kettleers, where he batted .248 with six home runs and 25 RBIs in 37 games.

As a sophomore in 2018, Toglia started all 59 of UCLA's games, slashing .336/.449/.588 with 11 home runs and 58 RBIs, and was named to the All-Pac-12 First Team. He then returned to Kettleers, batting .220 with eight home runs and 24 RBIs in 38 games. Prior to the 2019 season, Toglia was named a preseason All-American by Collegiate Baseball.

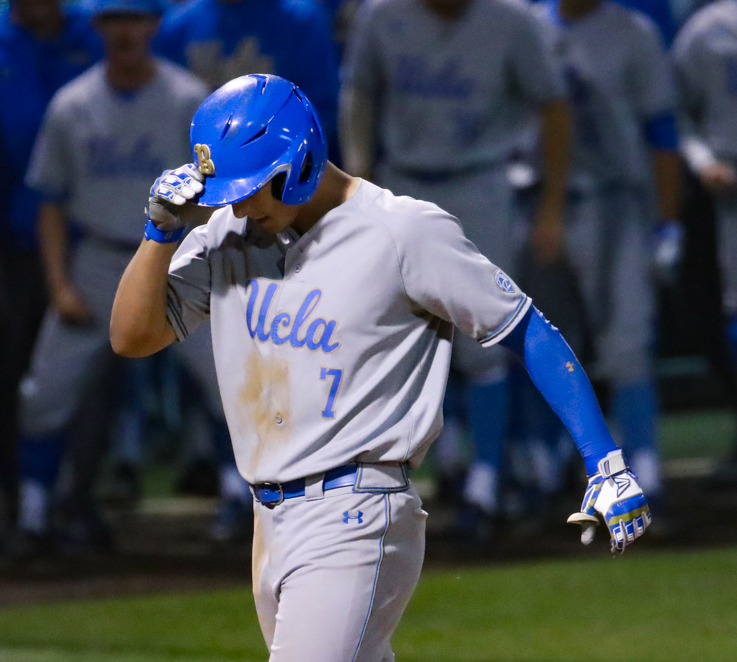
Toglia with UCLA in 2019

He finished his junior year batting .314 with 17 home runs and 65 RBIs in 63 games. He was named to the All-Pac-12 First Team for the second consecutive year.

== Professional career ==
=== Colorado Rockies ===
Toglia was considered one of the top prospects for the 2019 Major League Baseball (MLB) draft. The Colorado Rockies selected him again, with the 23rd overall pick, and he signed for $2.7 million. He played that summer for the Boise Hawks of the Low-A Northwest League. Over 41 games, he slashed .248/.369/.483 with nine home runs and 26 RBI.

Toglia did not play in a game in 2020 due to the cancellation of the minor league season because of the COVID-19 pandemic. To begin the 2021 season, Toglia was assigned to the Spokane Indians of the High-A West. In June, he was selected for the All-Star Futures Game at Coors Field. After slashing .234/.333/.465 with 17 home runs, 66 RBI, and seven stolen bases over 74 games in Spokane, he was promoted to the Hartford Yard Goats of the Double-A Northeast on August 2. Over 41 games with Hartford, he slashed .217/.331/.406 with five home runs and 18 RBI. He the played in the Arizona Fall League for the Salt River Rafters after the season and was named to the Fall Stars game.

Toglia returned to Hartford to begin the 2022 season. Over 97 games with the Yard Goats, he slashed .234/.339/.466 with 23 home runs. In early August, Toglia was promoted to the Albuquerque Isotopes of the Triple-A Pacific Coast League.

The Rockies selected Toglia's contract and promoted him to the major leagues on August 30, 2022. He made his MLB debut that night, starting at first base against the Atlanta Braves at Truist Park. He went hitless over four at-bats in a 3–2 Rockies win. He collected his first MLB hit, a single off Kyle Wright of Atlanta, the next night later hitting his first MLB home run off closer Kenley Jansen. Toglia appeared in 31 games for the Rockies to close the season, slashing .216/.275/.378 (.653 OPS) with two home runs.

Toglia was optioned to Albuquerque to begin the 2023 season. He played 78 games with the Isotopes, slashing .256/.368/.474 with 16 home runs. That season, Toglia also appeared in 45 games for the Rockies where he slashed .163/.224/.284 with four home runs and one stolen base.

In 2024, Toglia made the Opening Day roster for the first time in his career. However, after slumping, he was sent down to play 30 games for the Albuquerque Isotopes, where he slashed .277/.363/.571 (.934 OPS) with nine home runs. Toglia spent most of the season with the Rockies, appearing in 116 games and slashing .218/.311/.456 (.767 OPS) with 25 home runs. On July 14, he became the first Rockies switch hitter to hit three home runs in one game; he did so in an 8–5 win over the New York Mets.

Toglia was named to the Rockies Opening Day roster to begin the 2025 season. In late May, he was optioned to Albuquerque after leading MLB in strikeouts. He played a total of 88 games for Colorado and hit .190 with 11 home runs and 32 RBI while striking out 132 times across 337 plate appearances. According to Baseball Reference, Toglia was tied with LaMonte Wade Jr. for the fewest batting wins above replacement (WAR) in 2025, with -1.7. On November 18, Toglia was designated for assignment by the Rockies. Three days later, he was non-tendered and became a free agent.

=== Cincinnati Reds ===
On January 7, 2026, Toglia signed a minor league contract with the Cincinnati Reds. In 97 appearances for the Triple–A Louisville Bats, he slashed .273/.373/.547 with 22 home runs, 65 RBI, and four stolen bases. On August 11, the Reds selected Toglia's contract, adding him to their active roster. In 10 appearances for Cincinnati, he batted .115/.179/.192 with one RBI. On August 24, it was announced that Toglia would require season–ending surgery to repair a labrum tear and dislocation in his right shoulder.

=== Seattle Mariners ===
On October 2, 2026, Toglia was claimed off waivers for the Seattle Mariners.

== Personal life ==
Toglia married his wife in November 2025. He has two brothers.
