= 2023 Colorado Rockies season =

2023 Colorado Rockies
- League: National League
- Division: West
- Ballpark: Coors Field
- City: Denver, Colorado
- Record: 59–103 (.364)
- Divisional place: 5th
- Owners: Charles & Richard Monfort
- General manager: Bill Schmidt
- Manager: Bud Black
- Television: AT&T Sportsnet Rocky Mountain
- Radio: KOA (English); KNRV (Spanish)
- Stats: ESPN.com; Baseball Reference

The 2023 Colorado Rockies season was their 31st in Major League Baseball and 29th season at Coors Field. Bud Black returned as Manager for his seventh year in 2023. The Rockies failed to improve on their 68–94 record from the previous season. They ended up finishing the season with the worst record in the National League at 59–103 (.364) due to a leaky defense despite scoring more runs than the playoff-bound Miami Marlins. On September 26, the Rockies hit the 100 loss mark for the first time in franchise history after a loss to the rival Los Angeles Dodgers. The Rockies drew an average home attendance of 32,196 in 81 home games in the 2023 MLB season, the 14th highest in the league.

== Offseason ==
=== Rule changes ===
Pursuant to the CBA, new rule changes went into effect for the 2023 season:

- institution of a pitch clock between pitches;
- limits on pickoff attempts per plate appearance;
- limits on defensive shifts requiring two infielders to be on either side of second and be within the boundary of the infield; and
- larger bases (increased to 18 square inches);

=== Coaching staff changes ===
On October 13, 2022, the Rockies mutually parted ways with hitting coach Dave Magadan and reassigned third-base coach Stu Cole to a minor league position. Magadan had been the Rockies hitting coach since the 2019 season, and Cole had been the third-base coach since the 2013 season. On November 7, 2022, the Rockies announced they had hired the New York Yankees' assistant hitting coach Hensley Meulens as their hitting coach for the 2023 season, and had promoted the Albuquerque Isotopes' manager Warren Schaeffer to the position of third-base coach.

=== Roster departures ===
On November 6, 2022, Alex Colomé, Carlos Estévez, José Iglesias, Chad Kuhl, and José Ureña declared free agency. On November 8, 2022, the Rockies declined their 2023 option on Scott Oberg. On November 9, 2022, Dom Núñez was claimed off of waivers by the San Francisco Giants, Ryan Vilade was claimed off of waivers by the Pittsburgh Pirates, and Ty Blach, Helcris Olivarez, and Wynton Bernard were outrighted to Triple-A Albuquerque Isotopes. The Rockies announced they had non–tendered utility player Garrett Hampson, immediately making him a free agent, on November 18, 2022.

=== Roster additions ===
On November 15, the Rockies selected the contracts of infielder Warming Bernabel, pitcher Blair Calvo, infielder Julio Carreras, outfielder Brenton Doyle, and pitcher Riley Pint.

==== Free agent signings ====
Starting pitcher José Ureña re-signed with the Rockies to a one–year contract on November 11, 2022. Relief pitcher Brent Suter was claimed off of waivers by the Rockies from the Milwaukee Brewers on November 18, 2022. The Rockies signed relief pitcher Pierce Johnson to a one-year contract on December 13, 2022. Relief pitcher Nick Mears was claimed off of waivers from the Texas Rangers on January 6, 2023. On March 4, 2023, the Rockies signed relief pitcher Brad Hand to a one-year deal. On March 5, the Rockies signed infielder Mike Moustakas to a minor-league deal. Both signings were made after injuries to players already on the roster; relief pitcher Lucas Gilbreath and second baseman Brendan Rodgers. Following an injury to outfielder Sean Bouchard, the Rockies signed outfielder Jurickson Profar to a 1-year contract on March 21, 2023. On March 25, 2023, the Rockies selected the contracts of non-roster invitees pitcher Ty Blach, utilityman Harold Castro, and infielder Mike Moustakas.

=== Trades ===
On November 6, 2022, the Rockies traded outfielder Sam Hilliard to the Atlanta Braves for minor league pitcher Dylan Spain. On November 15, 2022, the Rockies traded minor league infielder Juan Brito to the Cleveland Guardians for outfielder Nolan Jones. On December 6, 2022 the Rockies traded pitcher Chad Smith to the Oakland Athletics for minor league pitcher Jeff Criswell. On December 18, 2022, the Rockies traded outfielder Connor Joe to the Pittsburgh Pirates for minor league pitcher Nick Garcia. On January 17, 2023, the Rockies acquired Connor Seabold from the Boston Red Sox for cash considerations or a player to be named later.

Off-season 40-man roster moves

Departing Player	Date	Transaction	New Team	Arriving player	Old team	Date	Transaction
Sam Hilliard	November 6, 2022	Trade	Atlanta Braves	José Ureña	Colorado Rockies	November 11, 2022	Signed
Alex Colomé	November 6, 2022	Free Agency	Washington Nationals	Warming Bernabel	Spokane Indians	November 15, 2022	Added to 40-man roster
Carlos Estévez	November 6, 2022	Free Agency	Los Angeles Angels	Blair Calvo	Hartford Yard Goats	November 15, 2022	Added to 40-man roster
José Iglesias	November 6, 2022	Free Agency	Miami Marlins	Julio Carreras	Hartford Yard Goats	November 15, 2022	Added to 40-man roster
Chad Kuhl	November 6, 2022	Free Agency	Washington Nationals	Brenton Doyle	Albuquerque Isotopes	November 15, 2022	Added to 40-man roster
José Ureña	November 6, 2022	Free Agency	Colorado Rockies	Riley Pint	Albuquerque Isotopes	November 15, 2022	Added to 40-man roster
Scott Oberg	November 8, 2022	Free Agency	Retired	Nolan Jones	Cleveland Guardians	November 15, 2022	Trade
Dom Núñez	November 9, 2022	Waivers	San Francisco Giants	Brent Suter	Milwaukee Brewers	November 18, 2022	Waivers
Ryan Vilade	November 9, 2022	Waivers	Pittsburgh Pirates	Pierce Johnson	San Diego Padres	December 13, 2022	Free Agency
Ty Blach	November 9, 2022	Outrighted	Colorado Rockies	Nick Mears	Texas Rangers	January 6, 2023	Waivers
Helcris Olivarez	November 9, 2022	Outrighted	Albuquerque Isotopes	Connor Seabold	Boston Red Sox	January 17, 2023	Trade
Wynton Bernard	November 9, 2022	Outrighted	Toronto Blue Jays	Brad Hand	Philadelphia Phillies	March 4, 2023	Free Agency
Garrett Hampson	November 18, 2022	Non-tendered	Miami Marlins	Jurickson Profar	San Diego Padres	March 21, 2023	Free Agency
Chad Smith	December 6, 2022	Trade	Oakland Athletics	Ty Blach	Colorado Rockies	March 25, 2023	Added to 40-man roster
Connor Joe	December 18, 2022	Trade	Pittsburgh Pirates	Harold Castro	Detroit Tigers	March 25, 2023	Added to 40-man roster
				Mike Moustakas	Cincinnati Reds	March 25, 2023	Added to 40-man roster

== Spring Training ==
On January 27, 2023, the Rockies announced 22 non-roster invitees for spring training, including top prospects outfielder Zac Veen and catcher Drew Romo.

Spring Training non-roster invitees

Player	Position	2022 team(s)
Fernando Abad	Pitcher	Saraperos de Saltillo / Tacoma Rainiers
Logan Allen	Pitcher	Cleveland Guardians / Baltimore Orioles / Norfolk Tides / Albuquerque Isotopes
Ty Blach	Pitcher	Colorado Rockies / Albuquerque Isotopes
Jeff Criswell	Pitcher	Lansing Lugnuts / Midland RockHounds / Las Vegas Aviators
Stephen Jones	Pitcher	Hartford Yard Goats
Karl Kauffman	Pitcher	Hartford Yard Goats / Albuquerque Isotopes
Matt Koch	Pitcher	Seattle Mariners / Tacoma Rainiers
Josh Rogers	Pitcher	Washington Nationals / Jacksonville Jumbo Shrimp / Rochester Red Wings / Harrisburg Senators / FCL Nationals
Phillips Valdéz	Pitcher	Boston Red Sox / Worcester Red Sox / Tacoma Rainiers
Case Williams	Pitcher	Fresno Grizzlies / Spokane Indians / Hartford Yard Goats
T. J. Zeuch	Pitcher	Cincinnati Reds / Louisville Bats / Memphis Redbirds / ACL Reds
Braxton Fulford	Catcher	Fresno Grizzlies
Hunter Goodman	Catcher	Fresno Grizzlies / Spokane Indians / Hartford Yard Goats
Willie MacIver	Catcher	Hartford Yard Goats / Albuquerque Isotopes
Jonathan Morales	Catcher	Albuquerque Isotopes
Ronaiker Palma	Catcher	Spokane Indians
Drew Romo	Catcher	Spokane Indians
Harold Castro	Infielder	Detroit Tigers
Grant Lavigne	Infielder	Spokane Indians / Hartford Yard Goats
Coco Montes	Infielder	Hartford Yard Goats / Albuquerque Isotopes
Mike Moustakas	Infielder	Cincinnati Reds
Cole Tucker	Outfielder	Pittsburgh Pirates / Indianapolis Indians / Reno Aces / ACL Diamondbacks Black
Zac Veen	Outfielder	Spokane Indians / Hartford Yard Goats

== Regular season ==
=== June ===
On Saturday, June 24, the Rockies lost to the Los Angeles Angels in a 1-25 blowout, during which the Angels set new franchise records for both runs scored and hits recorded in a single game. The result was the worst loss in Rockies history, and the 13 runs allowed by Colorado in the 3rd inning is unmatched in the club's record.

Although the Angels outscored the Rockies by a run total of 32-12 over the course of the series, Colorado was victorious in the games played on Friday, June 23, and Sunday, June 25. This -20 run differential currently stands second only to the -23 recorded by the Louisville Colonels in their June 1897 series against the Chicago Colts as the worst run differential by a series-winning team in MLB history.

=== Game log ===
Legend
	Rockies win
	Rockies loss
	Postponement
	Eliminated from playoff race
**Bold**	Rockies team member

2023 Game Log: 59–103 (Home: 37–44; Away: 22–59)
March/April: 9–20 (Home: 4–9; Away: 5–11)

#	Date	Opponent	Score	Win	Loss	Save	Attendance	Record	Streak
1	March 30	@ Padres	7–2	**Márquez** (1–0)	Snell (0–1)	—	45,103	1–0	W1
2	March 31	@ Padres	4–1	**Freeland** (1–0)	Martinez (0–1)	**Johnson** (1)	43,177	2–0	W2
3	April 1	@ Padres	4–8	Wacha (1–0)	**Ureña** (0–1)	—	42,663	2–1	L1
4	April 2	@ Padres	1–3	Lugo (1–0)	**Gomber** (0–1)	Hader (1)	43,972	2–2	L2
5	April 3	@ Dodgers	4–13	Almonte (1–0)	**Feltner** (0–1)	—	49,792	2–3	L3
6	April 4	@ Dodgers	2–5	Urías (2–0)	**Márquez** (1–1)	Phillips (1)	52,290	2–4	L4
7	April 6	Nationals	1–0	**Freeland** (2–0)	Gray (0–2)	**Johnson** (2)	48,230	3–4	W1
8	April 7	Nationals	5–10	Gore (2–0)	**Ureña** (0–2)	—	30,869	3–5	L1
9	April 8	Nationals	6–7	Williams (1–1)	**Gomber** (0–2)	Edwards Jr. (1)	34,503	3–6	L2
10	April 9	Nationals	7–6	**Lamet** (1–0)	Ramírez (0–1)	**Johnson** (3)	30,283	4–6	W1
11	April 10	Cardinals	7–4	**Márquez** (2–1)	Matz (0–2)	—	24,092	5–6	W2
12	April 11	Cardinals	6–9	Gallegos (1–0)	**Johnson** (0–1)	Helsley (2)	25,399	5–7	L1
13	April 12	Cardinals	4–7	Pallante (1–0)	**Lawrence** (0–1)	Helsley (3)	22,250	5–8	L2
14	April 14	@ Mariners	3–5	Brash (1–1)	**Gomber** (0–3)	Sewald (3)	32,698	5–9	L3
15	April 15	@ Mariners	2–9	Kirby (1–1)	**Feltner** (0–2)	—	27,549	5–10	L4
16	April 16	@ Mariners	0–1	Castillo (2–0)	**Lamet** (1–1)	Sewald (4)	23,858	5–11	L5
17	April 17	Pirates	3–14	Hill (1–2)	**Freeland** (2–1)	—	20,322	5–12	L6
18	April 18	Pirates	3–5	Velasquez (2–2)	**Ureña** (0–3)	Bednar (5)	19,495	5–13	L7
19	April 19	Pirates	3–14	Oviedo (2–1)	**Gomber** (0–4)	—	18,511	5–14	L8
20	April 20	@ Phillies	5–0	**Feltner** (1–2)	Strahm (1–2)	—	35,062	6–14	W1
21	April 21	@ Phillies	3–4	Domínguez (1–1)	**Hand** (0–1)	Alvarado (3)	43,261	6–15	L1
22	April 22	@ Phillies	3–4	Brogdon (1–0)	**Freeland** (2–2)	Kimbrel (2)	41,939	6–16	L2
23	April 23	@ Phillies	3–9	Wheeler (2–1)	**Ureña** (0–4)	—	44,618	6–17	L3
24	April 24	@ Guardians	6–0	**Gomber** (1–4)	Quantrill (1–2)	—	9,258	7–17	W1
25	April 25	@ Guardians	5–1	**Feltner** (2–2)	Battenfield (0–2)	—	9,493	8–17	W2
26	April 26	@ Guardians	1–4	Bibee (1–0)	**Márquez** (2–2)	Clase (8)	9,841	8–18	L1
27	April 28	Diamondbacks	1–9	Kelly (2–3)	**Freeland** (2–3)	—	24,197	8–19	L2
28	April 29	Diamondbacks	4–11	Henry (1–0)	**Davis** (0–1)	—	34,399	8–20	L3
29	April 30	Diamondbacks	12–4	**Gomber** (2–4)	Nelson (1–2)	—	31,900	9–20	W1

May: 15–13 (Home: 11–5; Away: 4–8)

#	Date	Opponent	Score	Win	Loss	Save	Attendance	Record	Streak
30	May 2	Brewers	3–2	**Lawrence** (1–1)	Strzelecki (2–1)	**Johnson** (4)	19,517	10–20	W2
31	May 3	Brewers	7–1	**Freeland** (3–3)	Lauer (3–3)	—	20,640	11–20	W3
32	May 4	Brewers	9–6	**Hand** (1–1)	Strzelecki (2–2)	—	30,647	12–20	W4
33	May 5	@ Mets	0–1	Senga (4–1)	**Senzatela** (0–1)	Ottavino (4)	25,854	12–21	L1
34	May 6	@ Mets	5–2	**Gomber** (3–4)	Megill (3–2)	**Johnson** (5)	35,692	13–21	W1
35	May 7	@ Mets	13–6	**Suter** (1–0)	Yacabonis (2–1)	—	36,501	14–21	W2
36	May 8	@ Pirates	0–2	Keller (4–1)	**Freeland** (3–4)	—	9,596	14–22	L1
37	May 9	@ Pirates	10–1	**Seabold** (1–0)	Ortiz (0–1)	—	11,916	15–22	W1
38	May 10	@ Pirates	4–3	**Hand** (2–1)	Stephenson (0–1)	**Johnson** (6)	13,491	16–22	W2
39	May 12	Phillies	3–6	Strahm (3–3)	**Lawrence** (1–2)	Kimbrel (4)	32,038	16–23	L1
40	May 13	Phillies	4–7	Brogdon (2–0)	**Feltner** (2–3)	Soto (1)	34,006	16–24	L2
41	May 14	Phillies	4–0	**Freeland** (4–4)	Nola (3–3)	—	30,325	17–24	W1
42	May 15	Reds	9–8	**Bard** (1–0)	Lively (1–1)	**Johnson** (7)	20,259	18–24	W2
43	May 16	Reds	1–3	Law (3–4)	**Lambert** (0–1)	Díaz (10)	20,611	18–25	L1
44	May 17	Reds	11–6	**Suter** (2–0)	Ashcraft (2–2)	**Johnson** (8)	22,654	19–25	W1
45	May 19	@ Rangers	2–7	Pérez (5–1)	**Kauffmann** (0–1)	—	30,819	19–26	L1
46	May 20	@ Rangers	5–11	Gray (4–1)	**Freeland** (4–5)	—	34,443	19–27	L2
47	May 21	@ Rangers	3–13	Heaney (3–3)	**Seabold** (1–1)	—	32,733	19–28	L3
48	May 22	Marlins	5–3	**Bird** (1–0)	Cabrera (3–4)	**Johnson** (9)	20,331	20–28	W1
49	May 23	Marlins	5–4	**Gomber** (4–4)	Pérez (1–1)	**Johnson** (10)	19,470	21–28	W2
50	May 24	Marlins	2–10	Alcántara (2–5)	**Kauffmann** (0–2)	—	19,546	21–29	L1
51	May 25	Marlins	7–6	**Suter** (3–0)	Brazobán (0–1)	—	20,738	22–29	W1
52	May 26	Mets	2–5	Scherzer (4–2)	**Seabold** (1–2)	Ottavino (5)	30,288	22–30	L1
53	May 27	Mets	10–7	**Lawrence** (2–2)	Brigham (0–1)	**Johnson** (11)	36,874	23–30	W1
54	May 28	Mets	11–10	**Lambert** (1–1)	Nogosek (0–1)	—	47,471	24–30	W2
55	May 29	@ Diamondbacks	5–7	Nelson (2–2)	**Kauffmann** (0–3)	Chafin (8)	15,304	24–31	L1
56	May 30	@ Diamondbacks	1–5	Gallen (7–2)	**Freeland** (4–6)	—	11,146	24–32	L2
57	May 31	@ Diamondbacks	0–6	Henry (3–1)	**Lamet** (1–2)	—	11,844	24–33	L3

June: 9–18 (Home: 5–8; Away: 4–10)

#	Date	Opponent	Score	Win	Loss	Save	Attendance	Record	Streak
58	June 1	@ Diamondbacks	4–5	Ginkel (2–0)	**Johnson** (0–2)	—	16,492	24–34	L4
59	June 2	@ Royals	7–2	**Suter** (4–0)	Hernández (0–3)	—	23,482	25–34	W1
60	June 3	@ Royals	6–4	**Carasiti** (1–0)	Lynch (0–1)	**Lawrence** (2)	16,492	26–34	W2
61	June 4	@ Royals	0–2	Singer (4–4)	**Freeland** (4–7)	Barlow (7)	13,128	26–35	L1
62	June 6	Giants	4–10	Walker (2–0)	**Lamet** (1–3)	—	29,190	26–36	L2
63	June 7	Giants	4–5	Rogers (2–2)	**Lawrence** (2–3)	Doval (15)	24,149	26–37	L3
64	June 8	Giants	4–6	Alexander (5–0)	**Johnson** (0–3)	Doval (16)	30,372	26–38	L4
65	June 9	Padres	6–9	Darvish (5–4)	**Gomber** (4–5)	Hader (14)	32,551	26–39	L5
66	June 10	Padres	2–3	Carlton (2–0)	**Bird** (1–1)	Hader (15)	37,234	26–40	L6
67	June 11	Padres	5–4	**Lawrence** (3–3)	Honeywell Jr. (2–4)	—	34,724	27–40	W1
68	June 12	@ Red Sox	4–3 (10)	**Bard** (2–0)	Pivetta (3–4)	**Carasiti** (1)	32,227	28–40	W2
69	June 13	@ Red Sox	7–6 (10)	**Bard** (3–0)	Garza (0–1)	**Johnson** (12)	31,400	29–40	W3
70	June 14	@ Red Sox	3–6	Whitlock (4–2)	**Gomber** (4–6)	—	31,977	29–41	L1
71	June 15	@ Braves	3–8	Smith-Shawver (1–0)	**Freeland** (4–8)	Tonkin (1)	38,555	29–42	L2
72	June 16	@ Braves	1–8	Shuster (4–2)	**Lamet** (1–4)	—	41,214	29–43	L3
73	June 17	@ Braves	2–10	Elder (5–1)	**Seabold** (0–1)	—	41,558	29–44	L4
74	June 18	@ Braves	6–14	Morton (6–6)	**Anderson** (0–1)	—	41,161	29–45	L5
75	June 19	@ Reds	4–5	Young (1–0)	**Gomber** (4–7)	Díaz (19)	20,344	29–46	L6
76	June 20	@ Reds	6–8	Young (2–0)	**Davis** (0–2)	Díaz (20)	28,291	29–47	L7
77	June 21	@ Reds	3–5	Gibaut (8–1)	**Bard** (3–1)	Farmer (2)	23,637	29–48	L8
78	June 23	Angels	7–4	**Johnson** (1–3)	Bachman (1–1)	**Lawrence** (3)	47,085	30–48	W1
79	June 24	Angels	1–25	Canning (6–2)	**Anderson** (0–2)	—	45,274	30–49	L1
80	June 25	Angels	4–3	**Gomber** (5–7)	Anderson (4–2)	**Lawrence** (4)	40,213	31–49	W1
81	June 27	Dodgers	0–5	Kershaw (10–4)	**Seabold** (1–4)	Phillips (11)	38,738	31–50	L1
82	June 28	Dodgers	9–8	**Bird** (2–1)	González (2–3)	**Lawrence** (5)	37,267	32–50	W1
83	June 29	Dodgers	3–14	Sheehan (2–0)	**Anderson** (0–3)	—	36,667	32–51	L1
84	June 30	Tigers	8–5	**Gomber** (6–7)	Lorenzen (2–6)	**Johnson** (13)	47,239	33–51	W1

July: 9–13 (Home: 5–6; Away: 4–7)

#	Date	Opponent	Score	Win	Loss	Save	Attendance	Record	Streak
85	July 1	Tigers	2–4 (10)	Lange (5–2)	**Johnson** (1–4)	—	48,108	33–52	L1
86	July 2	Tigers	9–14	Manning (2–1)	**Seabold** (1–5)	—	40,145	33–53	L2
87	July 4	@ Astros	1–4	Bielak (4–4)	**Freeland** (4–9)	—	39,533	33–54	L3
88	July 5	@ Astros	4–6	France (4–3)	**Anderson** (0–4)	Pressly (19)	36,535	33–55	L4
89	July 7	@ Giants	5–2	**Gomber** (7–7)	Rogers (4–3)	**Bard** (1)	33,886	34–55	W1
90	July 8	@ Giants	3–5	Wood (4–3)	**Seabold** (1–6)	Doval (26)	34,568	34–56	L1
91	July 9	@ Giants	0–1	Webb (8–7)	**Freeland** (4–10)	—	36,050	34–57	L2
**93rd All-Star Game in Seattle, Washington**
92	July 14	Yankees	7–2	**Gomber** (8–7)	Rodón (0–2)	—	47,058	35–57	W1
93	July 15	Yankees	3–6	Schmidt (5–6)	**Seabold** (1–7)	Holmes (11)	48,632	35–58	L1
94	July 16	Yankees	8–7 (11)	**Hollowell** (1–0)	Marinaccio (4–5)	—	47,211	36–58	W1
95	July 18	Astros	4–3	**Abad** (1–0)	Brown (6–7)	**Lawrence** (6)	43,871	37–58	W2
96	July 19	Astros	1–4	Bielak (5–5)	**Gomber** (8–8)	—	36,937	37–59	L1
97	July 21	@ Marlins	6–1	**Lambert** (2–1)	Garrett (5–3)	—	14,092	38–59	W1
98	July 22	@ Marlins	4–3	**Bard** (4–1)	Scott (4–3)	**Lawrence** (7)	15,226	39–59	W2
99	July 23	@ Marlins	2–3 (10)	Brazobán (4–2)	**Johnson** (1–5)	—	14,613	39–60	L1
100	July 24	@ Nationals	10–6	**Kauffmann** (1–3)	Corbin (6–11)	—	17,194	40–60	W1
101	July 25	@ Nationals	5–6	Ferrer (1–0)	**Lawrence** (3–4)	Finnegan (14)	18,182	40–61	L1
102	July 26	@ Nationals	4–5	Machado (1–0)	**Bard** (4–2)	—	16,893	40–62	L2
103	July 28	Athletics	5–8	Sears (2–7)	**Freeland** (4–11)	May (10)	37,262	40–63	L3
104	July 29	Athletics	3–11	Blackburn (2–2)	**Flexen** (0–5)	—	45,085	40–64	L4
105	July 30	Athletics	2–0	**Blach** (1–0)	Medina (3–8)	**Lawrence** (8)	31,789	41–64	W1
106	July 31	Padres	4–3 (10)	**Hand** (4–4)	Martinez (4–4)	—	25,582	42–64	W2

August: 7–20 (Home: 3–8; Away: 4–12)

#	Date	Opponent	Score	Win	Loss	Save	Attendance	Record	Streak
107	August 1	Padres	5–8	Suárez (1–0)	**Lambert** (2–2)	Hader (26)	27,417	42–65	L1
108	August 2	Padres	1–11	Kerr (1–1)	**Freeland** (4–12)	—	28,437	42–66	L2
109	August 4	@ Cardinals	9–4	**Flexen** (1–5)	Wainwright (3–6)	—	38,559	43–66	W1
110	August 5	@ Cardinals	2–6	Matz (3–7)	**Blach** (1–1)	—	38,121	43–67	L1
111	August 6	@ Cardinals	1–0	**Gomber** (9–8)	Thompson (2–4)	**Lawrence** (9)	40,051	44–67	W1
112	August 7	@ Brewers	1–12	Peralta (8–8)	**Lambert** (2–3)	—	24,759	44–68	L1
113	August 8	@ Brewers	7–3 (10)	**Koch** (1–0)	Chafin (2–4)	—	25,365	45–68	W1
114	August 9	@ Brewers	6–7 (10)	Wilson (4–0)	**Lawrence** (3–5)	—	35,173	45–69	L1
115	August 10	@ Dodgers	1–2	Yarbrough (5–5)	**Doyle** (0–1)	Graterol (5)	45,933	45–70	L2
116	August 11	@ Dodgers	1–6	Lynn (9–9)	**Gomber** (9–9)	—	49,315	45–71	L3
117	August 12	@ Dodgers	1–4	Gonsolin (8–4)	**Lambert** (2–4)	Phillips (17)	52,515	45–72	L4
118	August 13	@ Dodgers	3–8	Urías (10–6)	**Freeland** (4–13)	—	45,904	45–73	L5
119	August 14	Diamondbacks	6–4	**Koch** (2–0)	Mantiply (1–1)	**Lawrence** (10)	24,157	46–73	W1
120	August 15	Diamondbacks	5–8	Ginkel (6–0)	**Lawrence** (3–6)	Sewald (24)	23,644	46–74	L1
121	August 16	Diamondbacks	7–9	Nelson (7–3)	**Kinley** (0–1)	Sewald (25)	22,824	46–75	L2
122	August 18	White Sox	14–1	**Lambert** (3–4)	Kopech (5–11)	—	35,249	47–75	W1
123	August 19	White Sox	11–5	**Freeland** (5–13)	Scholtens (1–6)	—	46,601	48–75	W2
124	August 20	White Sox	5–10	Bummer (4–2)	**Koch** (2–1)	—	40,151	48–76	L1
125	August 22	@ Rays	4–12	Kittredge (1–0)	**Suter** (4–1)	—	10,235	48–77	L2
126	August 23	@ Rays	5–6 (10)	Fairbanks (2–4)	**Suter** (4–2)	—	12,001	48–78	L3
127	August 24	@ Rays	3–5	Adam (4–2)	**Koch** (2–2)	Fairbanks (16)	9,972	48–79	L4
128	August 25	@ Orioles	4–5	Fujinami (6–8)	**Suter** (4–3)	Coulombe (2)	28,872	48–80	L5
129	August 26	@ Orioles	4–5	Bradish (9–6)	**Flexen** (1–6)	Canó (5)	42,535	48–81	L6
130	August 27	@ Orioles	4–3	**Lawrence** (4–6)	Canó (1–3)	—	30,773	49–81	W1
131	August 28	Braves	4–14	Elder (11–4)	**Kauffmann** (1–4)	—	27,024	49–82	L1
132	August 29	Braves	1–3	Morton (14–10)	**Lambert** (3–5)	Iglesias (26)	25,244	49–83	L2
133	August 30	Braves	3–7	Vines (1–0)	**Freeland** (5–14)	—	27,425	49–84	L3

September/October: 10–19 (Home: 9–8; Away: 1–11)

#	Date	Opponent	Score	Win	Loss	Save	Attendance	Record	Streak
134	September 1	Blue Jays	9–13	Cabrera (3–1)	**Bird** (2–2)	—	27,397	49–85	L4
135	September 2	Blue Jays	8–7	**Blach** (2–1)	Kikuchi (9–5)	**Kinley** (1)	40,445	50–85	W1
136	September 3	Blue Jays	5–7	Green (1–0)	**Lawrence** (4–7)	Romano (32)	32,283	50–86	L1
137	September 4	@ Diamondbacks	2–4	Kelly (11–6)	**Lambert** (3–6)	Sewald (30)	18,097	50–87	L2
138	September 5	@ Diamondbacks	3–2	**Freeland** (6–14)	Pfaadt (1–8)	**Kinley** (2)	12,994	51–87	W1
139	September 6	@ Diamondbacks	5–12	Jarvis (2–0)	**Flexen** (1–7)	—	11,044	51–88	L1
140	September 8	@ Giants	8–9	Brebbia (3–0)	**Bird** (2–3)	Doval (36)	32,448	51–89	L2
141	September 9	@ Giants	1–9	Webb (10–12)	**Anderson** (0–5)	—	34,290	51–90	L3
142	September 10	@ Giants	3–6	Winn (1–2)	**Lambert** (3–7)	Doval (37)	33,781	51–91	L4
143	September 11	Cubs	4–5	Smyly (11–9)	**Kinley** (0–2)	Fulmer (2)	30,620	51–92	L5
144	September 12	Cubs	6–4	**Bird** (3–3)	Palencia (5–2)	**Lawrence** (11)	32,058	52–92	W1
145	September 13	Cubs	7–3	**Blach** (3–1)	Taillon (7–10)	**Kinley** (3)	32,171	53–92	W2
—	September 14	Giants	Postponed (inclement weather); Makeup: September 16						
146	September 15	Giants	3–2	**Koch** (3–2)	Doval (6–5)	—	38,253	54–92	W3
147	September 16 (1)	Giants	9–5	**Kauffmann** (2–4)	Walker (4–3)	**Hollowell** (1)	22,101	55–92	W4
148	September 16 (2)	Giants	5–2	**Vodnik** (1–0)	Alexander (7–3)	**Kinley** (3)	43,885	56–92	W5
149	September 17	Giants	10–11	Manaea (6–6)	**Flexen** (1–8)	Rogers (2)	30,619	56–93	L1
150	September 18	@ Padres	9–11	Wacha (12–4)	**Blach** (3–2)	Hader (30)	42,062	56–94	L2
151	September 19	@ Padres	0–2	Hader (1–3)	**Kinley** (0–3)	—	39,809	56–95	L3
152	September 20	@ Padres	2–3	García (2–3)	**Anderson** (0–6)	Hader (31)	35,479	56–96	L4
153	September 22	@ Cubs	0–6	Taillon (8–10)	**Davis** (0–3)	—	32,150	56–97	L5
154	September 23	@ Cubs	3–6	Assad (5–3)	**Mears** (0–1)	Cuas (1)	38,608	56–98	L6
155	September 24	@ Cubs	3–4	Wicks (4–1)	**Blach** (3–3)	Merryweather (2)	37,060	56–99	L7
156	September 26 (1)	Dodgers	4–1	**Anderson** (1–6)	Ferguson (7–4)	**Kinley** (5)	24,648	57–99	W1
157	September 26 (2)	Dodgers	2–11	Miller (11–4)	**Feltner** (2–4)	—	25,133	57–100	L1
158	September 27	Dodgers	2–8	Sheehan (4–1)	**Davis** (0–4)	—	26,054	57–101	L2
159	September 28	Dodgers	14–5	**Flexen** (2–8)	Yarbrough (8–7)	—	30,129	58–101	W1
160	September 29	Twins	6–7	Funderburk (2–0)	**Kinley** (0–4)	Pagán (1)	47,272	58–102	L1
161	September 30	Twins	6–14	Paddack (1–0)	**Kauffmann** (2–5)	—	40,264	58–103	L2
162	October 1	Twins	3–2 (11)	**Hollowell** (2–0)	Luplow (0–1)	—	33,375	59–103	W1

== Season standings ==
=== National League West ===
NL West
Team	W	L	Pct.	GB	Home	Road
Los Angeles Dodgers	100	62	.617	—	53‍–‍28	47‍–‍34
Arizona Diamondbacks	84	78	.519	16	43‍–‍38	41‍–‍40
San Diego Padres	82	80	.506	18	44‍–‍37	38‍–‍43
San Francisco Giants	79	83	.488	21	45‍–‍36	34‍–‍47
Colorado Rockies	59	103	.364	41	37‍–‍44	22‍–‍59

=== National League Wild Card ===
Division leaders
Team	W	L	Pct.
Atlanta Braves	104	58	.642
Los Angeles Dodgers	100	62	.617
Milwaukee Brewers	92	70	.568

Wild Card teams (Top 3 teams qualify for postseason)
Team	W	L	Pct.	GB
Philadelphia Phillies	90	72	.556	+6
Miami Marlins	84	78	.519	—
Arizona Diamondbacks	84	78	.519	—
Chicago Cubs	83	79	.512	1
San Diego Padres	82	80	.506	2
Cincinnati Reds	82	80	.506	2
San Francisco Giants	79	83	.488	5
Pittsburgh Pirates	76	86	.469	8
New York Mets	75	87	.463	9
St. Louis Cardinals	71	91	.438	13
Washington Nationals	71	91	.438	13
Colorado Rockies	59	103	.364	25

=== Record vs. opponents ===
==== Record vs. National League ====
2023 National League record Source: MLB Standings Grid – 2023
Team	AZ	ATL	CHC	CIN	COL	LAD	MIA	MIL	NYM	PHI	PIT	SD	SF	STL	WSH	AL
Arizona	—	3–3	6–1	3–4	10–3	5–8	2–4	4–2	1–6	3–4	4–2	7–6	7–6	3–3	5–1	21–25
Atlanta	3–3	—	4–2	5–1	7–0	4–3	9–4	5–1	10–3	8–5	4–3	3–4	4–2	4–2	8–5	26–20
Chicago	1–6	2–4	—	6–7	4–2	3–4	2–4	6–7	3–3	1–5	10–3	4–3	5–1	8–5	3–4	25–21
Cincinnati	4–3	1–5	7–6	—	4–2	4–2	3–3	3–10	4–2	3–4	5–8	3–3	3–4	6–7	4–3	28–18
Colorado	3–10	0–7	2–4	2–4	—	3–10	5–2	4–2	4–2	2–5	2–4	4–9	4–9	3–3	3–4	18–28
Los Angeles	8–5	3–4	4–3	2–4	10–3	—	3–3	5–1	3–3	4–2	4–3	9–4	7–6	4–3	4–2	30–16
Miami	4–2	4–9	4–2	3–3	2–5	3–3	—	3–4	4–8	7–6	5–2	2–4	3–3	3–4	11–2	26–20
Milwaukee	2–4	1–5	7–6	10–3	2–4	1–5	4–3	—	6–1	4–2	8–5	6–1	2–5	8–5	3–3	28–18
New York	6–1	3–10	3–3	2–4	2–4	3–3	8–4	1–6	—	6–7	3–3	3–3	4–3	4–3	7–6	19–27
Philadelphia	4–3	5–8	5–1	4–3	5–2	2–4	6–7	2–4	7–6	—	3–3	5–2	2–4	5–1	7–6	28–18
Pittsburgh	2–4	3–4	3–10	8–5	4–2	3–4	2–5	5–8	3–3	3–3	—	5–1	2–4	9–4	5–2	19–27
San Diego	6–7	4–3	3–4	3–3	9–4	4–9	4–2	1–6	3–3	2–5	1–5	—	8–5	3–3	3–3	28–18
San Francisco	6–7	2–4	1–5	4–3	9–4	6–7	3–3	5–2	3–4	4–2	4–2	5–8	—	6–1	1–5	20–26
St. Louis	3–3	2–4	5–8	7–6	3–3	3–4	4–3	5–8	3–4	1–5	4–9	3–3	1–6	—	4–2	23–23
Washington	1–5	5–8	4–3	3–4	4–3	2–4	2–11	3–3	6–7	6–7	2–5	3–3	5–1	2–4	—	23–23

Updated with the results of all games through October 1, 2023.

==== Record vs. American League ====
2023 National League record vs. American League Source: MLB Standings
Team	BAL	BOS	CWS	CLE	DET	HOU	KC	LAA	MIN	NYY	OAK	SEA	TB	TEX	TOR
Arizona	1–2	1–2	2–1	2–1	3–0	0–3	2–1	2–1	0–3	1–2	2–1	1–2	1–2	3–1	0–3
Atlanta	2–1	1–3	1–2	2–1	2–1	0–3	3–0	2–1	3–0	3–0	1–2	2–1	2–1	2–1	0–3
Chicago	2–1	1–2	3–1	1–2	2–1	0–3	2–1	0–3	1–2	2–1	3–0	2–1	2–1	2–1	2–1
Cincinnati	2–1	2–1	1–2	2–2	2–1	3–0	3–0	3–0	1–2	0–3	2–1	2–1	1–2	3–0	1–2
Colorado	1–2	2–1	2–1	2–1	1–2	1–3	2–1	2–1	1–2	2–1	1–2	0–3	0–3	0–3	1–2
Los Angeles	2–1	2–1	2–1	2–1	2–1	2–1	1–2	4–0	2–1	1–2	3–0	3–0	1–2	2–1	1–2
Miami	0–3	3–0	2–1	2–1	2–1	1–2	3–0	3–0	2–1	2–1	3–0	1–2	1–3	0–3	1–2
Milwaukee	2–1	1–2	3–0	2–1	1–2	2–1	3–0	2–1	2–2	2–1	0–3	3–0	1–2	3–0	1–2
New York	0–3	1–2	2–1	3–0	0–3	1–2	0–3	1–2	1–2	2–2	3–0	2–1	2–1	1–2	0–3
Philadelphia	2–1	1–2	2–1	1–2	3–0	2–1	2–1	2–1	1–2	1–2	3–0	2–1	3–0	0–3	3–1
Pittsburgh	1–2	3–0	2–1	1–2	2–2	1–2	3–0	1–2	1–2	1–2	1–2	1–2	0–3	1–2	0–3
San Diego	2–1	1–2	3–0	2–1	2–1	1–2	1–2	3–0	1–2	1–2	3–0	1–3	2–1	3–0	2–1
San Francisco	1–2	2–1	2–1	2–1	0–3	2–1	1–2	1–2	2–1	1–2	2–2	1–2	1–2	1–2	1–2
St. Louis	2–1	3–0	2–1	1–2	1–2	1–2	2–2	0–3	1–2	2–1	2–1	1–2	2–1	1–2	2–1
Washington	0–4	2–1	2–1	1–2	2–1	1–2	2–1	1–2	2–1	2–1	3–0	2–1	0–3	2–1	1–2

Updated with the results of all games through October 1, 2023.

== Roster ==
2023 Colorado Rockies
Roster
Pitchers: 60 Fernando Abad; 45 Chase Anderson; 52 Daniel Bard; 59 Jake Bird; 50 Ty Blach; 55 Justin Bruihl; 56 Blair Calvo; 62 Matt Carasiti; 63 Noah Davis; 57 Tommy Doyle; 18 Ryan Feltner; 32 Chris Flexen; 21 Kyle Freeland; 26 Austin Gomber; 55 Brad Hand; 64 Gavin Hollowell; 36 Pierce Johnson; 56 Evan Justice; 51 Karl Kauffmann; 40 Tyler Kinley; 54 Matt Koch; 20 Peter Lambert; 32 Dinelson Lamet; 61 Justin Lawrence; 48 Germán Márquez; 46 Nick Mears; 41 Riley Pint; 43 Connor Seabold; 49 Antonio Senzatela; 39 Brent Suter; 51 José Ureña; 60 Victor Vodnik	Catchers: 38 Jorge Alfaro; 35 Elías Díaz; 6 Brian Serven; 16 Austin Wynns; Infielders: 30 Harold Castro; 25 C. J. Cron; 15 Hunter Goodman; 56 Connor Kaiser; 24 Ryan McMahon; 44 Elehuris Montero; 3 Coco Montes; 11 Mike Moustakas; 7 Brendan Rodgers; 4 Michael Toglia; 14 Ezequiel Tovar; 13 Alan Trejo; 11 Cole Tucker	Outfielders: 19 Charlie Blackmon; 12 Sean Bouchard; 23 Kris Bryant; 2 Yonathan Daza; 9 Brenton Doyle; 15 Randal Grichuk; 22 Nolan Jones; 29 Jurickson Profar	Manager: 10 Bud Black; Coaches: 74 Reid Cornelius (bullpen); 75 Kyle Cunningham (asst. bullpen catcher); 53 Ronnie Gideon (first base); 70 Andy González (asst. hitting); 31 Hensley Meulens (hitting); 77 Aaron Muñoz (bullpen catcher); 68 P. J. Pilittere (asst. hitting); 8 Mike Redmond (bench); 34 Warren Schaeffer (third base); 72 Darryl Scott (pitching)

== Statistics ==
Note: Stats in bold are the team leaders.

=== Batting ===
Note: G = Games played; AB = At bats; R = Runs; H = Hits; 2B = Doubles; 3B = Triples; HR = Home runs; RBI = Runs batted in; BB = Walks; SO = Strikeouts; AVG = Batting average; OBP = On-base percentage; SLG = Slugging; OPS = On base + slugging

Player	G	AB	R	H	2B	3B	HR	RBI	SB	CS	BB	SO	AVG	OBP	SLG	OPS
Ezequiel Tovar	**153**	**581**	79	**147**	**37**	4	15	**73**	11	**5**	25	166	.253	.287	.408	.695
Ryan McMahon	152	555	**80**	133	31	3	**23**	70	5	**5**	**68**	**198**	.240	**.322**	**.431**	**.753**
Elías Díaz	141	486	48	130	25	1	14	72	1	0	34	118	**.267**	.316	.409	.725
Jurickson Profar	111	415	51	98	25	2	8	39	1	0	45	86	.236	.316	.364	.680
Brenton Doyle	126	399	48	81	16	**5**	10	48	**22**	**5**	22	151	.203	.250	.343	.593
Nolan Jones	106	367	60	109	22	4	20	62	20	4	53	126	.297	.389	.542	.931
Charlie Blackmon	96	359	57	100	24	**5**	8	40	4	1	39	55	.279	.363	.440	.803
Kris Bryant	80	300	36	70	10	0	10	31	0	0	29	68	.233	.313	.367	.680
Elehuris Montero	85	284	40	69	15	2	11	39	0	0	15	111	.243	.290	.426	.716
Harold Castro	99	258	24	65	13	0	1	31	1	0	9	66	.252	.275	.314	.589
Randal Grichuk	64	240	40	74	19	1	8	27	2	2	18	51	.308	.365	.496	.861
C. J. Cron	56	208	31	54	12	0	11	32	0	0	13	50	.260	.304	.476	.780
Alan Trejo	82	207	24	48	11	0	4	26	5	1	16	51	.232	.288	.343	.631
Brendan Rodgers	46	178	21	46	9	1	4	20	0	0	11	41	.258	.313	.388	.701
Michael Toglia	45	141	18	23	5	0	4	9	1	1	10	50	.163	.224	.284	.507
Austin Wynns	45	117	11	25	5	0	1	8	1	0	8	32	.214	.273	.282	.555
Mike Moustakas	47	115	21	31	7	0	4	17	0	0	17	34	.270	.360	.435	.795
Yonathan Daza	24	74	8	20	6	0	0	7	1	0	3	13	.270	.304	.351	.655
Hunter Goodman	23	70	6	14	4	3	1	17	1	0	5	24	.200	.247	.386	.632
Coco Montes	18	38	3	7	2	0	1	3	0	0	2	12	.184	.244	.316	.560
Sean Bouchard	21	38	11	12	2	0	4	7	0	1	4	14	.316	.372	.684	1.056
Jorge Alfaro	10	31	2	5	4	0	1	4	0	0	0	12	.161	.188	.387	.575
Brian Serven	11	23	0	3	1	0	0	1	0	0	0	10	.130	.130	.174	.304
Cole Tucker	5	8	2	4	0	0	0	2	0	0	1	2	.500	.600	.500	1.100
Connor Kaiser	3	4	0	0	0	0	0	0	0	0	0	2	.000	.000	.000	.000
**Team totals**	**162**	**5496**	**720**	**1368**	**305**	**31**	**163**	**687**	**41**	**60**	**446**	**1542**	**.249**	**.310**	**.405**	**.715**

=== Pitching ===
List does not include position players. Stats in bold are the team leaders.

Note: W = Wins; L = Losses; ERA = Earned run average; G = Games pitched; GS = Games started; SV = Saves; IP = Innings pitched; H = Hits allowed; R = Runs allowed; ER = Earned runs allowed; BB = Walks allowed; K = Strikeouts

Player	W	L	ERA	G	GS	SV	IP	H	R	ER	BB	K
Kyle Freeland	6	**14**	5.03	29	**29**	0	**155.2**	**187**	**96**	**87**	42	**94**
Austin Gomber	**9**	9	5.50	27	27	0	139.0	164	88	85	43	87
Jake Bird	3	3	4.33	**70**	3	0	89.1	94	47	43	27	77
Peter Lambert	3	7	5.36	25	11	0	87.1	93	54	52	28	71
Connor Seabold	1	7	7.52	27	13	0	87.1	116	76	73	28	67
Chase Anderson	1	6	5.75	17	17	0	81.1	88	53	52	32	62
Ty Blach	3	3	5.54	20	13	0	78.0	104	51	48	24	50
Justin Lawrence	4	7	3.72	69	0	11	75.0	65	37	31	36	78
Brent Suter	4	3	3.38	57	2	0	69.1	65	36	26	25	55
Chris Flexen	2	4	6.27	12	12	0	60.1	74	45	42	19	45
Daniel Bard	4	2	4.56	50	0	1	49.1	35	30	25	**49**	47
Ryan Feltner	2	4	5.82	10	10	0	43.1	45	29	28	28	38
Pierce Johnson	1	5	6.00	43	0	**13**	39.0	47	28	26	25	58
Matt Koch	3	2	5.12	39	1	0	38.2	41	22	22	9	27
Brad Hand	3	1	4.54	40	0	0	35.2	35	18	18	16	41
Karl Kauffmann	2	5	8.23	11	3	0	35.0	42	34	32	16	16
Gavin Hollowell	2	0	5.88	26	0	1	33.2	30	23	22	18	32
Noah Davis	0	4	8.70	8	6	0	30.0	43	30	29	15	26
Dinelson Lamet	1	4	11.57	16	4	0	25.2	38	35	33	22	31
Matt Carasiti	1	0	6.29	16	0	1	24.1	28	19	17	11	16
Tommy Doyle	0	1	6.85	15	0	0	23.2	23	18	18	13	18
Germán Márquez	2	2	4.95	4	4	0	20.0	19	11	11	3	17
Nick Mears	0	1	3.72	16	0	0	19.1	15	8	8	14	21
José Ureña	0	4	9.82	5	5	0	18.1	27	22	20	14	9
Tyler Kinley	0	4	6.06	18	0	5	16.1	21	11	11	6	17
Victor Vodnik	1	0	8.31	6	0	0	8.2	15	9	8	3	12
Antonio Senzatela	0	1	4.70	2	2	0	7.2	7	4	4	2	4
Evan Justice	0	0	8.59	9	0	0	7.1	14	7	7	8	7
Fernando Abad	1	0	4.26	6	0	0	6.1	11	3	3	3	2
Justin Bruihl	0	0	14.73	7	0	0	3.2	4	7	6	3	3
Alan Trejo	0	0	13.50	2	0	0	2.0	4	3	3	0	1
Harold Castro	0	0	9.00	2	0	0	2.0	4	2	2	1	0
Blair Calvo	0	0	0.00	1	0	0	1.0	0	0	0	0	0
Riley Pint	0	0	27.00	1	0	0	0.1	1	1	1	3	0
**Team totals**	**59**	**103**	**5.67**	**162**	**162**	**32**	**1414.0**	**1598**	**957**	**891**	**586**	**1129**

Note: No qualifiers for ERA; no pitchers averaged 1 inning pitched per game (162 IP).

== Transactions ==
=== March ===
- March 27: Traded RHP Tony Locey to the Tampa Bay Rays for a player to be named later.
- March 28: Traded RHP T. J. Zeuch to the Philadelphia Phillies.
- March 30: Placed RHP Daniel Bard on the 10-day IL, recalled RHP Jake Bird from AAA Albuquerque.

=== April ===
- April 12: Placed RHP Germán Márquez on the 15-day IL retroactive to April 11, recalled INF/OF Nolan Jones from AAA Albuquerque
- April 16: Optioned INF/OF Nolan Jones to AAA Albuquerque, recalled RHP Noah Davis from AAA Albuquerque.
- April 18: Optioned RHP Connor Seabold to AAA Albuquerque, recalled RHP Peter Lambert from AAA Albuquerque.
- April 19: Activated RHP Daniel Bard from the 15-day IL, optioned RHP Peter Lambert to AAA Albuquerque.
- April 24: Optioned INF Elehuris Montero to AAA Albuquerque, recalled OF Brenton Doyle from AAA Albuquerque.
- April 26: Activated RHP Germán Márquez from the 15-day IL, designated RHP José Ureña for assignment.
- April 28: Placed RHP Germán Márquez on 15-day IL, recalled RHP Connor Seabold from AAA Albuquerque.
- April 29: Activated OF Randal Grichuk from 10-day IL, designated LHP Ty Blach for assignment.
- April 30: Placed RHP Noah Davis on 15-day IL, recalled RHP Nick Mears from AAA Albuquerque.

=== May ===
- May 4: Placed RHP Dinelson Lamet on the 15-day IL, recalled RHP Peter Lambert from Albuquerque, claimed C Austin Wynns off of waivers from the Los Angeles Dodgers.
- May 5: Activated RHP Antonio Senzatela from the 15-day IL, optioned C Brian Serven to AAA Albuquerque, designated OF Yonathan Daza for assignment.
- May 12: Claimed RHP Chase Anderson off of waivers from the Tampa Bay Rays.
- May 13: Placed RHP Antonio Senzatela on the 15-day IL.
- May 14: Placed RHP Ryan Feltner on the 15-day IL, recalled RHP Riley Pint from AAA Albuquerque.
- May 15: Placed 1B C. J. Cron on the 10-day IL and RHP Nick Mears on the 15-day IL. Recalled 1B Michael Toglia from AAA Albuquerque and purchased the contract of LHP Fernando Abad from AAA Albuquerque.
- May 19: Optioned RHP Riley Pint to AAA Albuquerque, purchased the contract of RHP Karl Kauffmann from AAA Albuquerque, transferred RHP Germán Márquez to the 60-day IL.
- May 21: Designated LHP Fernando Abad for assignment, purchased the contract of RHP Matt Carasiti from AAA Albuquerque.
- May 26: Optioned 1B Michael Toglia to AAA Albuquerque, recalled 3B Nolan Jones from AAA Albuquerque.
- May 29: Recalled 3B Elehuris Montero from AAA Albuquerque, activated from the 60-day IL and optioned to AAA Albuquerque LHP Ryan Rolison, transferred RHP Ryan Feltner to the 60-day IL, and placed OF Charlie Blackmon on the bereavement list.
- May 30: Recalled RHP Blair Calvo from AAA Albuquerque, optioned RHP Karl Kauffmann to AAA Albuquerque.
- May 31: Optioned RHP Blair Calvo to AAA Albuquerque, activated RHP Dinelson Lamet from the 15-day IL.

=== June ===
- June 1: Activated from the 15-day IL and optioned to AAA Albuquerque RHP Noah Davis. Activated OF Charlie Blackmon from the bereavement list, placed OF Kris Bryant on the 10-day IL.
- June 3: Activated from the 15-day IL and optioned to AAA Albuquerque RHP Nick Mears.
- June 11: Selected the contract of IF Coco Montes from AAA Albuquerque. Recalled C Brian Serven from AAA Albuquerque. Optioned IF Alan Trejo to AAA Albuquerque. Placed OF Charlie Blackmon on the 10-day IL. Transferred RHP Antonio Senzatela to the 60-day IL.
- June 15: Selected the contract of C Jorge Alfaro from AAA Albuquerque. Optioned C Brian Serven to AAA Albuquerque. Designated RHP Blair Calvo for assignment.
- June 17: Recalled RHP Gavin Hollowell from AAA Albuquerque. Designated RHP Dinelson Lamet for assignment.
- June 18: Traded RHP Blair Calvo to the Detroit Tigers for cash considerations.
- June 19: Placed SS Ezequiel Tovar on the paternity list. Selected the contract of SS Connor Kaiser from AAA Albuquerque.
- June 20: Optioned RHP Gavin Hollowell to AAA Albuquerque. Recalled RHP Noah Davis from AAA Albuquerque.
- June 21: Optioned RHP Noah Davis to AAA Albuquerque. Recalled RHP Karl Kauffmann from AAA Albuquerque.
- June 22: Activated SS Ezequiel Tovar from the paternity list. Optioned SS Connor Kaiser to AAA Albuquerque.
- June 23: Recalled RHP Noah Davis from AAA Albuquerque. Placed LHP Brent Suter on the 15-day IL.
- June 25: Traded INF Mike Moustakas to the Los Angeles Angels for minor league RHP Connor Van Scoyoc. Recalled 1B Michael Toglia from AAA Albuquerque. Optioned RHP Karl Kauffmann to AAA Albuquerque. Recalled RHP Nick Mears from AAA Albuquerque.
- June 26: Optioned RHP Noah Davis and 1B Michael Toglia to AAA Albuquerque. Activated 1B C. J. Cron from the 10-day IL.
- June 27: Selected the contract of RHP Matt Koch from AAA Albuquerque.
- June 28: Placed RHP Nick Mears on the 15-day IL. Recalled RHP Gavin Hollowell from AAA Albuquerque.
- June 30: Selected the contract of LHP Ty Blach from AAA Albuquerque. Activated 3B Kris Bryant from the 10-day IL. Designated C Jorge Alfaro for assignment. Placed RHP Matt Carasiti on the 15-day IL.

=== July ===
- July 2: Optioned RHP Peter Lambert to AAA Albuquerque. Selected the contract of LHP Fernando Abad from AAA Albuquerque. Designated SS Connor Kaiser for assignment.
- July 3: Optioned INF Coco Montes to AAA Albuquerque.
- July 4: Recalled SS Alan Trejo from AAA Albuquerque.
- July 10: Optioned 3B Elehuris Montero to AAA Albuquerque.
- July 14: Recalled 1B Michael Toglia from AAA Albuquerque. Recalled from AAA Albuquerque and placed on the 60-day IL LHP Ryan Rolison. Selected the contract of RHP Tommy Doyle from AAA Albuquerque. Placed LHP Kyle Freeland on the 15-day IL.
- July 19: Activated LHP Brent Suter from the 15-day IL. Designated LHP Fernando Abad for assignment.
- July 21: Optioned RHP Tommy Doyle to AAA Albuquerque. Recalled RHP Peter Lambert from AAA Albuquerque.
- July 24: Traded RHP Pierce Johnson to the Atlanta Braves for minor-league RHP Victor Vodnik and minor-league RHP Tanner Gordon. Recalled RHP Karl Kauffmann from AAA Albuquerque.
- July 25: Optioned RHP Karl Kauffmann to AAA Albuquerque. Recalled RHP Riley Pint from AAA Albuquerque. Recalled 3B Elehuris Montero from AAA Albuquerque. Placed OF Kris Bryant on the 10-day IL.
- July 27: Optioned RHP Riley Pint to AAA Albuquerque.
- July 28: Recalled RHP Tommy Doyle from AAA Albuquerque. Activated LHP Kyle Freeland from the 15-day IL. Placed RHP Chase Anderson on the 15-day IL.
- July 29: Optioned RHP Gavin Hollowell to AAA Albuquerque. Selected the contract of RHP Chris Flexen from AAA Albuquerque.
- July 30: Traded 1B C. J. Cron and OF Randal Grichuk to the Los Angeles Angels for minor-league LHP Mason Albright and minor-league RHP Jake Madden.
- July 31: Recalled SS Coco Montes from AAA Albuquerque. Activated 2B Brendan Rodgers from the 60-day IL.

=== August ===
- August 1: Traded LHP Brad Hand to the Atlanta Braves for minor-league RHP Alec Barger. Traded cash considerations to the Los Angeles Dodgers for LHP Justin Bruihl. Activated RHP Tyler Kinley from the 60-day IL.
- August 7: Optioned INF Coco Montes to AAA Albuquerque. Selected the contract of SS/OF Cole Tucker from AAA Albuquerque.
- August 9: Optioned RHP Connor Seabold to AAA Albuquerque. Recalled RHP Karl Kauffmann from AAA Albuquerque.
- August 11: Recalled LHP Justin Bruihl from AAA Albuquerque. Optioned RHP Tommy Doyle to AAA Albuquerque.
- August 14: Activated OF/DH Charlie Blackmon from the 10-day IL. Designated SS/OF Cole Tucker for assignment. Activated OF Sean Bouchard from the 60-day IL, and optioned him to AAA Albuquerque.
- August 15: Activated from the 15-day IL and optioned to AAA Albuquerque RHP Nick Mears.
- August 20: Recalled RHP Tommy Doyle from AAA Albuquerque. Placed RHP Tyler Kinley on the 15-day IL.
- August 25: Selected the contract of LHP Evan Justice from AAA Albuquerque. Designated LHP Justin Bruihl for assignment.
- August 27: Activated from the 15-day IL and optioned to AAA Albuquerque RHP Matt Carasiti. Released INF/OF Jurickson Profar. Selected the contract of C/1B/OF Hunter Goodman from AAA Albuquerque.
- August 29: Recalled RHP Gavin Hollowell from AAA Albuquerque. Optioned RHP Karl Kauffmann to AAA Albuquerque.

=== September ===
- September 1: Recalled OF Sean Bouchard from AAA Albuquerque. Activated RHP Tyler Kinley from the 15-day IL.
- September 3: Placed RHP Daniel Bard on the 15-day IL. Activated RHP Chase Anderson from the 15-day IL.
- September 4: Optioned RHP Tommy Doyle to AAA Albuquerque. Recalled RHP Nick Mears from AAA Albuquerque.
- September 5: Optioned 1B/OF Michael Toglia to AAA Albuquerque. Designated INF Coco Montes for assignment. Selected the contract of SS/OF Cole Tucker from AAA Albuquerque.
- September 8: Placed LHP Austin Gomber on the 60-day IL. Selected the contract of RHP Victor Vodnik from AAA Albuquerque.
- September 11: Designated SS/OF Cole Tucker for assignment. Activated OF Kris Bryant from the 10-day IL.
- September 16: Recalled RHP Karl Kauffmann from AAA Albuquerque. Optioned RHP Karl Kauffmann to AAA Albuquerque. Recalled RHP Matt Carasiti from AAA Albuquerque. Placed RHP Peter Lambert on the 15-day IL.
- September 17: Placed LHP Kyle Freeland on the 15-day IL. Recalled RHP Noah Davis from AAA Albuquerque.
- September 18: Activated RHP Daniel Bard from the 15-day IL. Reassigned LHP Evan Justice to the minor leagues.
- September 19: Activated RHP Ryan Feltner from the 60-day IL. Optioned RHP Matt Carasiti to AAA Albuquerque.
- September 27: Placed RHP Daniel Bard and RHP Ryan Feltner on the 15-day IL. Recalled RHP Tommy Doyle and RHP Karl Kauffmann from AAA Albuquerque.
- September 28: Recalled RHP Connor Seabold from AAA Albuquerque. Optioned RHP Noah Davis to Rookie ACL Rockies.

== Farm system ==
On January 13, 2023, the Rockies announced the coaching staffs of their Minor League affiliates.

Level	Team	League	Manager	W	L	Position
AAA	Albuquerque Isotopes	Pacific Coast League (East Division)	Pedro Lopez	68	82	3rd Place 23.0 GB
AA	Hartford Yard Goats	Eastern League (Northeast Division)	Chris Denorfia	57	76	6th Place 25.0 GB
High A	Spokane Indians	Northwest League	Robinson Cancel	62	67	4th Place 14.0 GB
Low A	Fresno Grizzlies	California League (North Division)	Steve Soliz	78	44	1st Place
Rookie	ACL Rockies	Arizona Complex League (East Division)	Fred Ocasio	40	15	1st Place
Foreign Rookie	DSL Rockies	Dominican Summer League (Northeast Division)	Mauricio Gonzalez	29	24	3rd Place 5.0 GB
Foreign Rookie	DSL Colorado	Dominican Summer League (Northeast Division)	Eugenio Jose	34	19	1st Place

== Major League Baseball draft ==
The 2023 Draft was held July 9–11, 2023.

2023 Draft Picks

Round	Pick	Name	Position	School	Signed
1	9	Chase Dollander	RHP	Tennessee	Yes ($5.72m)
2	46	Sean Sullivan	LHP	Wake Forest	Yes ($1.70m)
Comp B	65	Cole Carrigg	C/INF/OF	San Diego State	Yes ($1.30m)
3	77	Jack Mahoney	RHP	South Carolina	Yes ($925.00k)
4	109	Isaiah Coupet	LHP	Ohio State	Yes ($600.00k)
5	145	Kyle Karros	3B	UCLA	Yes ($433.50k)
6	172	Cade Denton	RHP	Oral Roberts	Yes ($500.00k)
7	202	Seth Halvorsen	RHP	Tennessee	Yes ($200.00k)
8	232	Braylen Wimmer	SS	South Carolina	Yes ($157.05k)
9	262	Ben McCabe	C	Central Florida	Yes ($150.00k)
10	292	Jace Kaminska	RHP	Nebraska	Yes ($150.00k)
11	322	Stu Flesland III	LHP	Washington	Yes ($150.00k)
12	352	Bryson Hammer	LHP	Dallas Baptist	Yes ($200.00k)
13	382	Caleb Hobson	OF	UT Martin	Yes ($150.00k)
14	412	Hunter Mann	RHP	Tennessee Tech	Yes ($130.00k)
15	442	Darius Perry	C	UCLA	Yes ($150.00k)
16	472	Austin Emener	LHP	East Tennessee State	Yes ($150.00k)
17	502	Aidan Longwell	1B	Kent State	Yes ($130.00k)
18	532	Yanzel Correa	RHP	International Baseball Academy of Puerto Rico	Yes ($100.00k)
19	562	Kannon Handy	LHP	Colorado Mesa	Yes ($100.00k)
20	592	Troy Butler	RHP	Herkimer County CC	Yes ($100.00k)

Records
Preceded by 2022	Colorado Rockies seasons 2023	Succeeded by 2024
