= Coco Montes =

American baseball player (born 1996)

Dorados de Chihuahua – No. 24
- Infielder / Outfielder
- Born: October 7, 1996 (age 29); Miami, Florida, U.S.
- Bats: Right Throws: Right

Professional debut
- MLB: June 11, 2023, for the Colorado Rockies
- NPB: July 26, 2024, for the Yomiuri Giants

MLB statistics (through 2025 season)
- Batting average: .188
- Home runs: 1
- Runs batted in: 4

NPB statistics (through 2024 season)
- Batting average: .272
- Home runs: 1
- Runs batted in: 14
- Stats at Baseball Reference

Teams
- Colorado Rockies (2023); Yomiuri Giants (2024); Tampa Bay Rays (2025)

Robert Patrick "Coco" Montes (born October 7, 1996) is an American professional baseball infielder for the Dorados de Chihuahua of the Mexican League. He has previously played in Major League Baseball (MLB) for the Colorado Rockies, and in Nippon Professional Baseball (NPB) for the Yomiuri Giants.

== Career ==
Montes was selected by the Washington Nationals in the 35th round, with the 1,064th overall selection, of the 2015 Major League Baseball draft out of Coral Gables High School. He did not sign, and attended the University of South Florida.

=== Colorado Rockies ===
Montes was drafted by the Colorado Rockies in the 15th round, with the 456th overall selection, of the 2018 Major League Baseball draft and signed.

Montes made his professional debut in 2018 with the rookie–level Grand Junction Rockies. He was named the Pioneer League MVP after hitting .333/.413/.513 with 8 home runs and 42 RBI in 69 contests. Montes spent 2019 with the Single–A Asheville Tourists, playing in 132 games and hitting .258/.305/.406 while setting career–highs in home runs (13) and RBI (89). Montes did not play in a game in 2020 due to the cancellation of the minor league season because of the COVID-19 pandemic.

In 2021, Montes spent the season with the Double–A Hartford Yard Goats, playing in 116 games and slashing .258/.317/.448 with 13 home runs and 60 RBI. He was assigned to Double–A Hartford to begin the 2022 season, and was quickly promoted to the Triple–A Albuquerque Isotopes. In 111 games for Albuquerque, he batted .274/.359/.500 with 20 home runs, 77 RBI, and 13 stolen bases. Montes began the 2023 season with Triple–A Albuquerque, where he played in 59 games and hit .321/.401/.560 with 12 home runs, 47 RBI, and 4 stolen bases.

On June 11, 2023, the Rockies selected Montes to the 40-man roster and promoted him to the major leagues for the first time. He made his debut that day as the starting second baseman against the San Diego Padres, going 2-for-3 with a home run and two RBI. The two-run home run came off of Luis García in the eighth inning to tie the game, and led to an eventual 5–4 victory. In 18 games for Colorado, he hit .184/.244/.316 with 1 home run and 3 RBI. On September 5, Montes was designated for assignment following the promotion of Cole Tucker. He cleared waivers and was sent outright to Triple–A Albuquerque on September 7.

Montes played in 64 games for Triple–A Albuquerque in 2024, hitting .335/.414/.551 with nine home runs, 47 RBI, and five stolen bases. He was released by the Rockies organization on June 25, 2024.

=== Yomiuri Giants ===
On June 27, 2024, Montes signed with the Yomiuri Giants of Nippon Professional Baseball. In 46 games for Yomiuri, Montes batted .272/.308/.391 with one home run and 14 RBI.

=== Tampa Bay Rays ===
On December 23, 2024, Montes signed a minor league contract with the Tampa Bay Rays. On March 27, 2025, the Rays selected Montes' contract and subsequently optioned him to the Triple-A Durham Bulls. In five games for the Rays, he went 2-for-10 (.200) with no home runs and one RBI. On July 26, Montes was designated for assignment by Tampa Bay. He cleared waivers and was sent outright to Durham on July 28. Montes elected free agency on November 2.

=== Saraperos de Saltillo ===
On May 3, 2026, Montes signed with the Saraperos de Saltillo of the Mexican League. In five games for Saltillo, he went 5-for-15 (.333) at the plate with two RBI. Montes was released by the Saraperos on May 13.

=== Dorados de Chihuahua ===
On May 15, 2026, Montes signed with the Dorados de Chihuahua of the Mexican League.

== Personal life ==
Montes garnered the nickname 'Coco' after he was born with a full head of hair that his mother shaved off. His grandfather then called him cocoliso, which loosely translates to coconut, and is slang for a bald person. In Cuba, Montes's great-grandfather, Manuel Ramírez, had been a lawyer representing American businesses. By August 1960, Ramírez arrived in Miami, Florida. He subsequently moved to Michigan, then settled in Hartford, Connecticut, and taught Spanish at Avon Old Farms. The family resettled in Miami in the 1970s.

Montes grew up idolizing Nomar Garciaparra of the Boston Red Sox.
