= Carson Tucker =

American baseball player (born 2002)

Free agent
- Shortstop
- Born: January 24, 2002 (age 24); Phoenix, Arizona, U.S.
- Bats: Right Throws: Right
Medals
Men's baseball
Representing United States
U-12 Baseball World Cup
Gold medal – first place	2013 Taipei	Team

Carson Wesley Tucker (born January 24, 2002) is an American professional baseball shortstop who is a free agent. He was selected 23rd overall by the Cleveland Indians in the 2020 Major League Baseball draft.

== Amateur career ==
Tucker attended Mountain Pointe High School in Phoenix, Arizona, where he played baseball. In 92 games at Mountain Pointe during his high school career, he hit .390 with five home runs and 68 runs batted in. In 2013 and 2014, he was selected for U-12 United States national baseball team. He committed to play college baseball at the University of Texas.

== Professional career ==
=== Cleveland Indians ===
Tucker was selected by the Cleveland Indians with the 23rd overall pick in the 2020 Major League Baseball draft. Tucker signed with the Indians on June 26 for a $2 million bonus. He did not play in a minor league game for the organization in 2020 due to the cancellation of the minor league season because of the COVID-19 pandemic. He made his professional debut in 2021 with the Rookie-level Arizona Complex League Indians, but appeared in only six games due to a hand injury. He was assigned to the Lynchburg Hillcats of the Low-A Carolina League to begin the 2022 season. In early May, he was placed on the injured list with a right forearm strain. Over 38 games, he hit .137 with one home run, nine RBI, and five doubles.

Tucker returned to Lynchburg in 2023, playing in 29 games and batting .200/.296/.263 with one home run, five RBI, and two stolen bases. He did not appear in a game for the Guardians organization in 2024. Tucker was released by Cleveland on July 3, 2024.

=== Ogden Raptors ===
On August 8, 2025, Tucker signed with the Ogden Raptors of the Pioneer League. In 18 appearances for the Raptors, Tucker batted .323/.469/.452 with one home run, 12 RBI, and six stolen bases.

=== San Diego Padres ===
On January 7, 2026, Tucker signed a minor league contract with the San Diego Padres. He played the 2026 season with the San Antonio Missions and batted .270 with two home runs and 28 RBI over 75 games. He elected free agency on November 2.

== Personal life ==
Tucker's brother, Cole, has played in Major League Baseball.
