= Tommy Doyle (baseball) =

American baseball player (born 1996)

Piratas de Campeche – No. 61
- Pitcher
- Born: May 1, 1996 (age 30); Vienna, Virginia, U.S.
- Bats: Right Throws: Right

MLB debut
- September 23, 2020, for the Colorado Rockies

MLB statistics (through 2023 season)
- Win–loss record: 0–1
- Earned run average: 8.31
- Strikeouts: 20
- Stats at Baseball Reference

Teams
- Colorado Rockies (2020, 2023)

Thomas Nelson Doyle (born May 1, 1996) is an American professional baseball pitcher for the Piratas de Campeche of the Mexican League. He has previously played in Major League Baseball (MLB) for the Colorado Rockies.

== Amateur career ==
Doyle attended Flint Hill School in Oakton, Virginia. The Washington Nationals drafted him in the 35th round of the 2014 Major League Baseball (MLB) draft, but he did not sign and played college baseball at the University of Virginia. In 2015, he briefly played collegiate summer baseball with the Orleans Firebirds of the Cape Cod Baseball League. The Colorado Rockies drafted him in the second round of the 2017 MLB draft.

== Professional career ==
=== Colorado Rockies ===
Doyle made his professional debut with the Grand Junction Rockies. He pitched 2018 with the Asheville Tourists, leading the South Atlantic League with 18 saves, and 2019 with the Lancaster JetHawks.

The Rockies invited Doyle to spring training by the Rockies in 2020. He was promoted to the major leagues by the Rockies on September 23. He made his major league debut that night against the San Francisco Giants. He pitched in three games that season, allowing 6 runs in 2 1/3 innings.

Doyle pitched for the Double-A Hartford Yard Goats in 2021, but injuries hampered his season. He missed parts of May and June with a biceps injury, then ended his season on June 29 with a shoulder injury that required surgery. On October 21, Doyle was outrighted off of the Rockies' 40-man roster. He missed the entirety of the 2022 season recovering from surgery.

Doyle began the 2023 season with the Triple-A Albuquerque Isotopes, making 22 appearances and logging a stellar 1.01 ERA with 29 strikeouts and 3 saves in 26 2/3 innings pitched. On July 14, the Rockies selected Doyle's contract, returning him to the active roster. In 15 games for Colorado, he struggled to a 6.85 ERA with 18 strikeouts across 23 2/3 innings of work. On November 17, Doyle was designated for assignment following the acquisition of Cal Quantrill. He was non-tendered and became a free agent on November 17.

=== Atlanta Braves ===
On November 25, 2023, Doyle signed a minor league contract with the Atlanta Braves. He spent the 2024 season with the Triple-A Gwinnett Stripers, also making one appearance for the rookie-level Florida Complex League Braves. He missed almost three months with a left oblique muscle strain. In 33 games for Gwinnett, Doyle compiled a 3–2 record and 3.48 ERA with 45 strikeouts and 3 saves across 41 1/3 innings pitched. He elected free agency following the season on November 4.

=== High Point Rockers ===
On January 22, 2025, Doyle signed a minor league contract with the Colorado Rockies. He was released prior to the start of the season on March 14. On April 25, Doyle signed with the High Point Rockers of the Atlantic League of Professional Baseball. In 16 appearances (four starts) for the Rockers, he posted a 1–3 record and 4.03 ERA with 43 strikeouts and five saves over 38 innings of work.

=== Leones de Yucatán ===
On July 7, 2025, Doyle's contract was purchased by the Leones de Yucatán of the Mexican League. In six appearances for Yucatán (including four starts), he threw 17 2/3 innings, registering an 0–1 record with a 6.11 ERA and 19 strikeouts.

In 2026, Doyle made four starts for the Leones, posting an 0–1 record with a 7.56 ERA and 18 strikeouts across 16 2/3 innings pitched. On May 8, 2026, Doyle was released by Yucatán.

=== Piratas de Campeche ===
On May 23, 2026, Doyle signed with the Piratas de Campeche of the Mexican League.
