= Connor Kaiser =

American baseball player (born 1996)

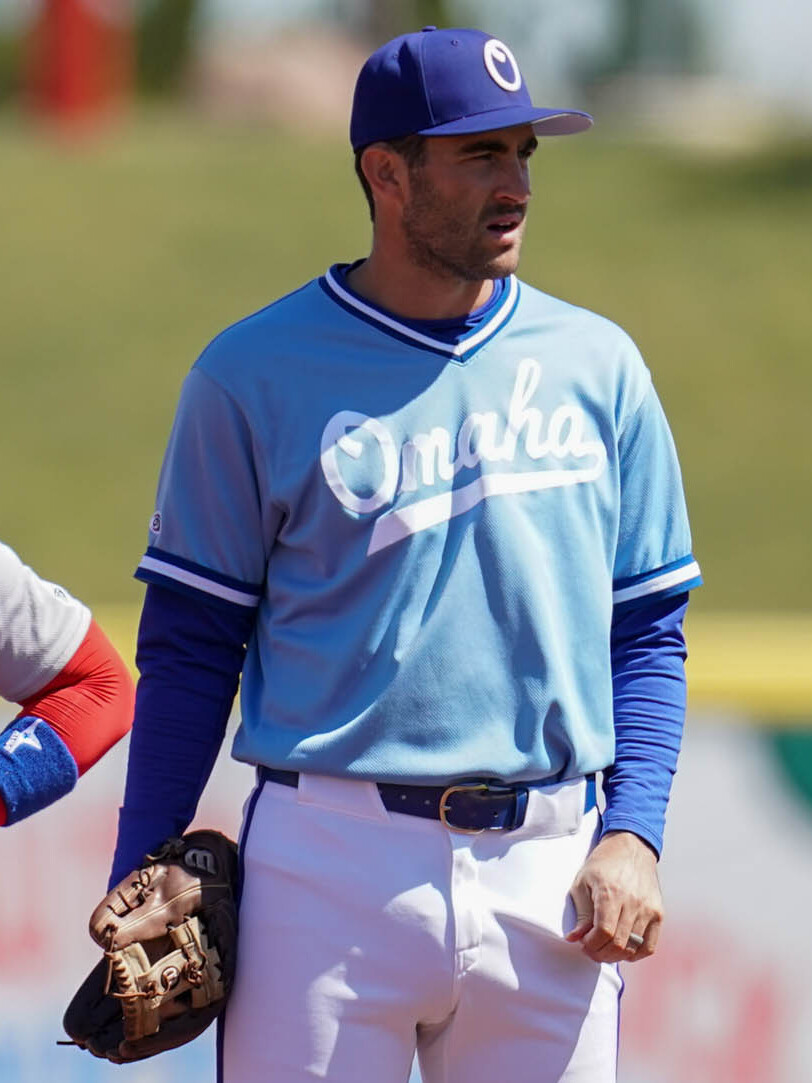
- Kaiser with the Omaha Storm Chasers in 2026

Free agent
- Shortstop
- Born: November 20, 1996 (age 29); Shawnee Mission, Kansas, U.S.
- Bats: Right Throws: Right

MLB debut
- June 19, 2023, for the Colorado Rockies

MLB statistics (through 2025 season)
- Batting average: .091
- Home runs: 0
- Runs batted in: 2
- Stats at Baseball Reference

Teams
- Colorado Rockies (2023); Arizona Diamondbacks (2025)

Connor William Kaiser (born November 20, 1996) is an American professional baseball shortstop who is a free agent. He has previously played in Major League Baseball (MLB) for the Colorado Rockies. He made his MLB debut in 2023.

== Career ==
=== Amateur career ===
Kaiser attended Blue Valley West High School in Overland Park, Kansas, and Vanderbilt University, where he played college baseball for the Vanderbilt Commodores. In 2017, he played collegiate summer baseball with the Yarmouth–Dennis Red Sox of the Cape Cod Baseball League. During the 2018 NCAA Division I baseball tournament, Kaiser tied a school-record with three home runs and an NCAA tournament record with 10 runs batted in (RBIs) during a game against the Clemson Tigers.

=== Pittsburgh Pirates ===
The Pittsburgh Pirates selected Kaiser in the third round, with the 86th overall selection, of the 2018 Major League Baseball draft. He signed with the Pirates and made his professional debut with the Low–A West Virginia Black Bears, also appearing for the Single–A West Virginia Power later in the year. In 2019, he played for the Greensboro Grasshoppers. Across 79 appearances, Kaiser batted .200/.331/.325 with career–highs in home runs (7) and RBI (36).

Kaiser did not play in a game in 2020 due to the cancellation of the minor league season because of the COVID-19 pandemic. He returned to action in 2021, and spent the year with the Double–A Altoona Curve, also playing in 5 games for the Triple–A Indianapolis Indians. In 48 games in Altoona, he struggled to a .195/.280/.322 batting line with 4 home runs and 14 RBI. Kaiser began the 2022 season with Triple–A Indianapolis, but played in just three games before he was released by the Pirates organization on May 4, 2022.

=== San Diego Padres ===
On May 10, 2022, Kaiser signed a minor league contract with the San Diego Padres organization. He played in 54 games for the Double–A San Antonio Missions, hitting .202/.299/.360 with 7 home runs, 28 RBI, and 9 stolen bases. He elected free agency following the season on November 10.

=== Colorado Rockies ===
On December 9, 2022, Kaiser signed a minor league contract with the Colorado Rockies organization. He began the 2023 season with the Triple–A Albuquerque Isotopes, playing in 50 games and hitting .278/.376/.506 with 7 home runs, 26 RBI, and 6 stolen bases. On June 19, 2023, the Rockies selected Kaiser's contract to the 40-man roster and promoted him to the major leagues for the first time. In 3 contests for Colorado, Kaiser went hitless in 4 at–bats. He was designated for assignment by the Rockies on July 2, following the promotion of Fernando Abad. Kaiser cleared waivers and was sent outright to Triple–A Albuquerque on July 4.

Kaiser spent the 2024 campaign with Triple–A Albuquerque, playing in 90 games and slashing .222/.343/.339 with six home runs, 28 RBI, and five stolen bases. He elected free agency following the season on November 4, 2024.

=== Arizona Diamondbacks ===
On November 15, 2024, Kaiser signed a minor league contract with the Arizona Diamondbacks organization. In 65 appearances for the Triple-A Reno Aces, he batted .236/.346/.423 with six home runs, 28 RBI, and two stolen bases. On August 1, 2025, the Diamondbacks selected Kaiser's contract, adding him to their active roster. On August 10, Kaiser recorded his first major league hit, hitting a double off the right center field fence in the seventh inning off of Ryan Rolison of the Colorado Rockies. In 11 appearances for the Diamondbacks, he went 2-for-18 (.111) with two RBI and one walk. On November 6, Kaiser was removed from the 40-man roster and sent outright to Reno. He elected free agency the same day.

=== Kansas City Royals ===
On November 8, 2025, Kaiser signed a minor league contract with the Kansas City Royals. In 26 games with Triple-A Omaha Storm Chasers he batted .118/.236/.132 with no home runs, 4 RBIs and one stolen base. He elected free agency on November 2.
