= Riley Pint =

American baseball player (born 1997)

- Pitcher
- Born: November 6, 1997 (age 28); Lenexa, Kansas, U.S.
- Batted: Right Threw: Right

MLB debut
- May 17, 2023, for the Colorado Rockies

Last MLB appearance
- August 14, 2024, for the Colorado Rockies

MLB statistics
- Win–loss record: 0–0
- Earned run average: 22.09
- Strikeouts: 7
- Stats at Baseball Reference

Teams
- Colorado Rockies (2023–2024)

Riley Kenneth Pint (born November 6, 1997) is an American former professional baseball pitcher. He was drafted fourth overall in the 2016 MLB draft by the Colorado Rockies, for whom he made his Major League Baseball (MLB) debut in 2023.

== Amateur career ==
Pint attended Saint Thomas Aquinas High School in Overland Park, Kansas. As a freshman, he had a 3–2 win–loss record with a 3.19 earned run average (ERA), and 35 strikeouts. As a sophomore, Pint went 8–0 with a 2.58 ERA and 57 strikeouts. As a junior, he was 5–2 with a 2.20 ERA and 47 strikeouts. Prior to his senior year, Pint and Jason Groome were the only two high school students on the Golden Spikes Award watchlist. Pint also played basketball in high school.

== Professional career ==
=== Colorado Rockies ===
Pint was considered a top prospect for the 2016 Major League Baseball draft. He was drafted by the Colorado Rockies with the fourth overall pick of the draft. He was committed to Louisiana State University (LSU) to play college baseball, but signed with the Rockies. He spent his first professional season with the Grand Junction Rockies of the Rookie-level Pioneer League, where he posted a 1–5 record with a 5.35 ERA in 11 starts. Pint spent 2017 with the Asheville Tourists of the Single-A South Atlantic League, where he pitched 93 innings and went 2–11 with a 5.42 ERA, 79 strikeouts, and 59 walks in 22 games started. He returned to Asheville to begin 2018, and injured his forearm in his first start, landing him on the 7-day disabled list. After returning from the injury, he was reassigned to the Boise Hawks and started three games for them, compiling a 1.13 ERA in eight innings pitched.

Pint returned to Asheville in 2019, but missed time due to injury; over 17 2/3 innings, he went 0–1 with an 8.66 ERA and 23 strikeouts. Pint did not play in a game in 2020 due to the cancellation of the minor league season because of the COVID-19 pandemic. To begin the 2021 season, he was assigned to the Spokane Indians of the High-A West League. He continued to struggle with his control, striking out 17 while walking 10 in 10 2/3 innings pitched, before he decided to retire on June 8, 2021.

On March 4, 2022, Pint un-retired and rejoined the Rockies organization. He split the season between the Double-A Hartford Yard Goats and the Triple-A Albuquerque Isotopes, logging a cumulative 2–2 record and 4.53 ERA with 58 strikeouts in 45 2/3 innings pitched across 41 appearances.

On November 15, 2022, the Rockies added Pint to the 40-man roster to protect him from the Rule 5 draft. Pint suffered a mild oblique strain during spring training and was optioned to Triple-A Albuquerque to begin the 2023 season. In 13 games for Albuquerque, Pint worked to a 7.41 ERA with 24 strikeouts in 17 innings pitched. On May 14, 2023, the Rockies announced that Pint would be promoted to the major leagues for the first time.

Pint was optioned to Triple–A Albuquerque to begin the 2024 season. In 4 games for the Rockies, he struggled to a 21.60 ERA with 7 strikeouts over 3 1/3 innings pitched. On August 17, 2024, Pint was removed from the 40–man roster and sent outright to Albuquerque. He elected free agency following the season on November 4.

=== Cleveland Guardians ===
On January 22, 2025, Pint signed a minor league contract with the Cleveland Guardians. However, he did not make an appearance for the organization, and elected free agency following the season on November 6.

=== San Diego Padres ===
On February 3, 2026, Pint signed a minor league contract with the San Diego Padres. He retired from professional baseball for a second time officially on March 16.
