= Evan Justice =

American baseball player (born 1998)

Colorado Rockies
- Pitcher
- Born: July 7, 1998 (age 28); Richmond, Virginia, U.S.
- Bats: Left Throws: Left

MLB debut
- August 26, 2023, for the Colorado Rockies

MLB statistics (through 2024 season)
- Win–loss record: 0–0
- Earned run average: 8.22
- Strikeouts: 8
- Stats at Baseball Reference

Teams
- Colorado Rockies (2023–2024)

John Evan William Justice (born July 7, 1998) is an American professional baseball pitcher in the Colorado Rockies organization. He played college baseball for the NC State Wolfpack.

== Amateur career ==
Justice attended Collegiate School for high school. As a senior in 2017, he was Virginia Player of the Year.

He played college baseball at NC State. In 2018, he played collegiate summer baseball with the Charlottesville Tom Sox. The following summer, he pitched for the Cotuit Kettleers of the Cape Cod Baseball League. He was drafted by the Miami Marlins in the 39th round of the 2019 MLB draft but did not sign with the team. In 2021, Justice was NC State's closer, saving 13 games. In four years with the Wolfpack, Justice was 11–2 with 13 saves and a 4.71 ERA.

== Professional career ==
Justice was drafted by the Colorado Rockies in the fifth round, with the 140th overall selection, of the 2021 MLB draft. He made his professional debut with the rookie-level Arizona Complex League Rockies. In 3 games, he logged a 3.00 ERA with 4 strikeouts in 3 innings of work. Justice missed the entirety of the 2022 season due to a shoulder strain injury.

Justice started the 2023 season in the low minors but ended the season in the major leagues. His year began in with the High-A Spokane Indians, and he was promoted to the Double-A Hartford Yard Goats in May, then the Triple-A Albuquerque Isotopes in July. In 38 combined games between the three affiliates, he posted a 3.49 ERA with 63 strikeouts, holding opposing batters to a .131 average. On August 25, Justice was selected to the 40-man roster and promoted to the major leagues for the first time. He made his debut the next day, allowing a run in one inning against the Baltimore Orioles. In 9 games during his rookie campaign, he struggled to an 8.59 ERA with 7 strikeouts across 7 1/3 innings pitched.

Justice was optioned to Triple-A to begin the 2024 season. He went on the injured list on April 16, not returning to Triple-A until June. He was called up to the Rockies on September 1 and made his only MLB appearance of the season that day. Facing the Orioles, he walked Gunnar Henderson then struck out Eloy Jiménez. Colorado sent Justice back to the minors on September 5. In 32 games with Albuquerque, he had an 8.76 ERA.

After the season, Justice played for the Salt River Rafters in the Arizona Fall League. He earned the save in the Fall League Championship game for Salt River. Justice was optioned to Triple-A Albuquerque to begin the 2025 season. He was designated for assignment following the promotion of Zach Agnos on April 20, 2025. Justice cleared waivers and was sent outright to Triple-A on April 23.

In 2026, Justice missed the entire season due to injury not appearing in a game at any level.
