= Juan Brito (infielder) =

Dominican baseball player (born 2001)

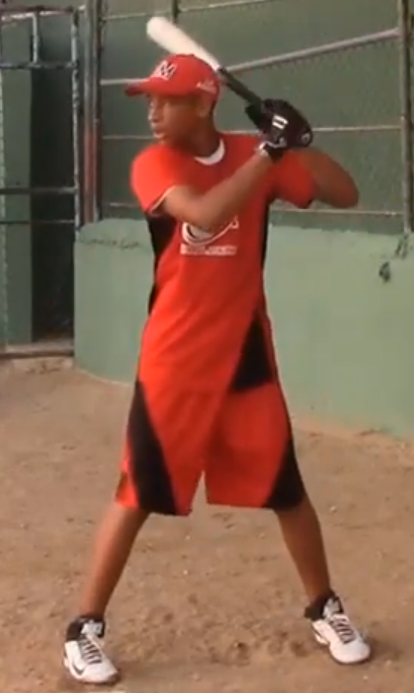
- Brito in 2017

Cincinnati Reds – No. 46
- Infielder
- Born: September 24, 2001 (age 25); Santo Domingo, Dominican Republic
- Bats: Switch Throws: Right

MLB debut
- April 7, 2026, for the Cleveland Guardians

MLB statistics (through 2026 season)
- Batting average: .245
- Home runs: 3
- Runs batted in: 14
- Stats at Baseball Reference

Teams
- Cleveland Guardians (2026); Cincinnati Reds (2026–present)

Juan Manuel Albert Brito Avila (born September 24, 2001) is a Dominican professional baseball infielder for the Cincinnati Reds of Major League Baseball (MLB). He has previously played in MLB for the Cleveland Guardians.

== Career ==
=== Colorado Rockies ===
Brito was signed by the Colorado Rockies as an international free agent on July 7, 2018. He made his professional debut in 2019 with the Dominican Summer League Rockies, hitting .328 with three home runs and 26 RBI in 35 games. Brito did not play in a game in 2020 due to the cancellation of the minor league season because of the COVID-19 pandemic.

Brito returned to action in 2021 with the rookie-level Arizona Complex League Rockies, batting .295/.406/.432 with three home runs, 11 RBI, and five stolen bases across 27 appearances. In 2022, he made 107 appearances for the Single-A Fresno Grizzlies, slashing .286/.407/.470 with 11 home runs, 72 RBI, and 17 stolen bases.

=== Cleveland Guardians ===
On November 15, 2022, the Rockies traded Brito to the Cleveland Guardians in exchange for Nolan Jones; the same day, the Guardians added Brito to their 40-man roster to protect him from selection by another club in the Rule 5 draft. Brito was optioned to the Triple-A Columbus Clippers to begin the 2023 season. In 127 games split between Columbus, the Double–A Akron RubberDucks, and High–A Lake County Captains, he batted a cumulative .271/.377/.434 with 14 home runs and 75 RBI.

Brito was again optioned to Triple–A Columbus to begin the 2024 season. In 144 appearances for Columbus, he slashed .256/.365/.443 with 21 home runs, 84 RBI, and 13 stolen bases.

Brito was once more optioned to Triple-A Columbus to begin the 2025 season. On April 25, 2025, Brito was ruled out for 8-to-12 weeks after undergoing surgery to repair a high-grade ligament sprain in his right thumb. Upon returning to Columbus, he slashed .256/.357/.463 with three home runs, 15 RBI, and four stolen bases across 24 appearances. On September 12, it was announced that Brito would require season-ending surgery to repair a damaged left hamstring; with a recovery timeline of 8-to-12 weeks.

Because he missed so much time due to being injured, Major League Baseball granted the Guardians a fourth option year on Brito following the 2025 season. Brito was optioned to Triple-A Columbus to begin the 2026 season. On April 7, 2026, Brito was promoted to the major leagues for the first time following an injury to Gabriel Arias. In the game, he recorded his first two MLB hits off of Kansas City Royals starter Noah Cameron. Brito made 15 appearances for Cleveland, slashing .176/.250/.255 with three RBI. On August 3, Brito was designated for assignment by the Guardians.

=== Cincinnati Reds ===
On August 3, 2026, Brito was traded to the Cincinnati Reds in exchange for cash considerations.
