= Brian Serven =

American baseball player (born 1995)

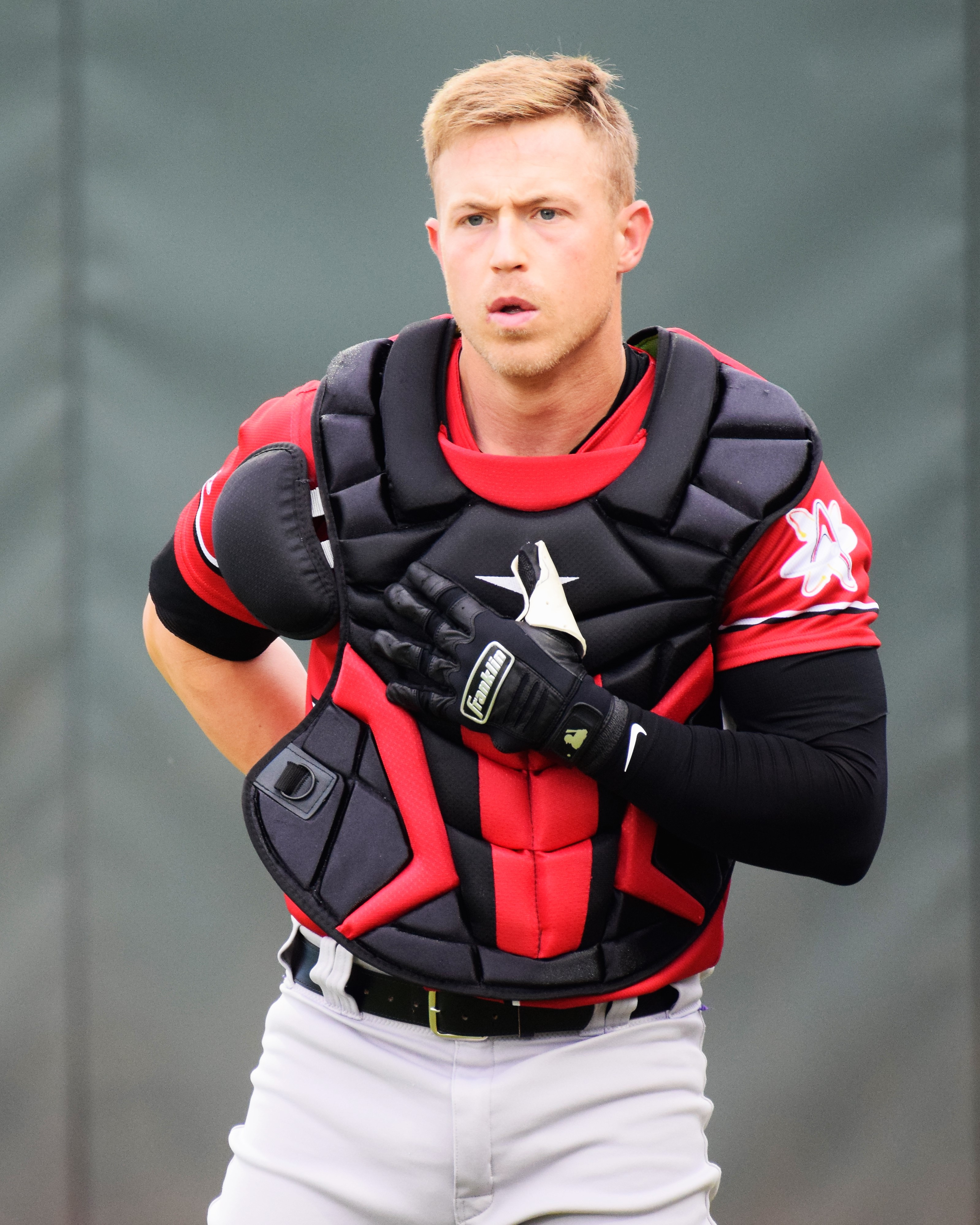
- Serven with the Albuquerque Isotopes in 2022

Athletics
- Catcher
- Born: May 5, 1995 (age 31); Palm Desert, California, U.S.
- Bats: Right Throws: Right

MLB debut
- May 18, 2022, for the Colorado Rockies

MLB statistics (through 2026 season)
- Batting average: .184
- Home runs: 11
- Runs batted in: 34
- Stats at Baseball Reference

Teams
- Colorado Rockies (2022–2023); Toronto Blue Jays (2024); Athletics (2026)

Brian Nicholas Serven (born May 5, 1995) is an American professional baseball catcher in the Athletics organization. He has previously played in Major League Baseball (MLB) for the Colorado Rockies and Toronto Blue Jays. Serven was drafted by the Rockies in the fifth round of the 2016 MLB draft and made his MLB debut with them in 2022.

== Early life ==
Serven was born in Palm Desert, California. He is childhood friends with infielder Scott Burcham. He attended Palm Desert High School where he led the Aztecs to the California Interscholastic Federation championship his junior year in 2012.

Serven played college baseball for the Arizona State Sun Devils. In 2014, he played collegiate summer baseball with the Bourne Braves of the Cape Cod Baseball League. With the Sun Devils, he batted .280 with 97 RBI in 162 games over three seasons. He was named to the First-Team All-Pac-12 team in 2015, his sophomore season.

== Career ==
=== Colorado Rockies ===
The Colorado Rockies selected Serven in the fifth round of the 2016 MLB draft.

Serven did not play in a game in 2020 due to the cancellation of the minor league season because of the COVID-19 pandemic. Returning to action in 2021, Serven spent the year with the Triple-A Albuquerque Isotopes. In 73 games, he slashed .250/.308/.504 with 16 home runs and 38 RBI. He returned to Albuquerque to begin the 2022 season.

On May 17, 2022, Serven was selected to the 40-man roster and promoted to the major leagues for the first time. He made his MLB debut the next day on May 18. In his second game for the Rockies on May 21, 2022, Serven hit two home runs against the New York Mets, becoming the first player in major league history to record his first two career hits with two multiple-run home runs in the same game. He finished his rookie season with a .203/.261/.332 slash line. Adjusting for playing in the hitter-friendly Coors Field, he was the third worst hitting catcher in 2022.

Serven had limited playing time in 2023, catching only 11 games for the Rockies. He was sent down by Colorado for the final time on June 15, when the team acquired Jorge Alfaro. Later in the minors, Serven missed one week with a concussion, then two months with a sprained thumb on his catching hand. He hit .130 with one double and one RBI for the Rockies.

=== Toronto Blue Jays ===
On January 5, 2024, Serven was claimed off waivers by the Chicago Cubs. However, he was designated for assignment by the team on January 11. On January 16, Serven was claimed off waivers by the Toronto Blue Jays. On January 29, he was removed from the 40-man roster and sent outright to the Triple-A Buffalo Bisons. On March 23, the Blue Jays announced that Serven had made the Opening Day roster following a strong spring and an injury to Danny Jansen. The team selected his contract on March 28. In 28 games for Toronto, he slashed .159/.243/.222 with no home runs and three RBI. Serven was designated for assignment by the Blue Jays on September 16. He cleared waivers and was sent outright to Buffalo on September 19. Serven elected free agency on October 1.

=== Detroit Tigers ===
On December 13, 2024, Serven signed a minor league contract with the Detroit Tigers. He made 69 appearances for the Single-A Lakeland Flying Tigers and Triple-A Toledo Mud Hens, batting a cumulative .231/.335/.317 with three home runs and 32 RBI. Serven elected free agency following the season on November 6, 2025.

=== Athletics ===
On December 19, 2025, Serven signed a minor league contract with the Athletics. On July 4, 2026, the Athletics selected Serven's contract, adding him to their active roster. On October 29, he was sent outright to Triple-A Las Vegas Aviators. He elected free agency on November 2. On November 19, Serven re-signed with the Athletics on a minor league contract.

== Personal life ==
Serven's parents are Jim and Laura Serven. His brother, Jonathan played college baseball for Long Beach State. He also has a younger sister, Kristina. Their father Jim coached several sports teams at Palm Desert High School and was also the sole survivor of a plane crash in 1978 that killed three other teenagers.

Serven also played basketball in high school. He was captain of the basketball team his senior season.
