= Harold Castro =

Venezuelan baseball player (born 1993)

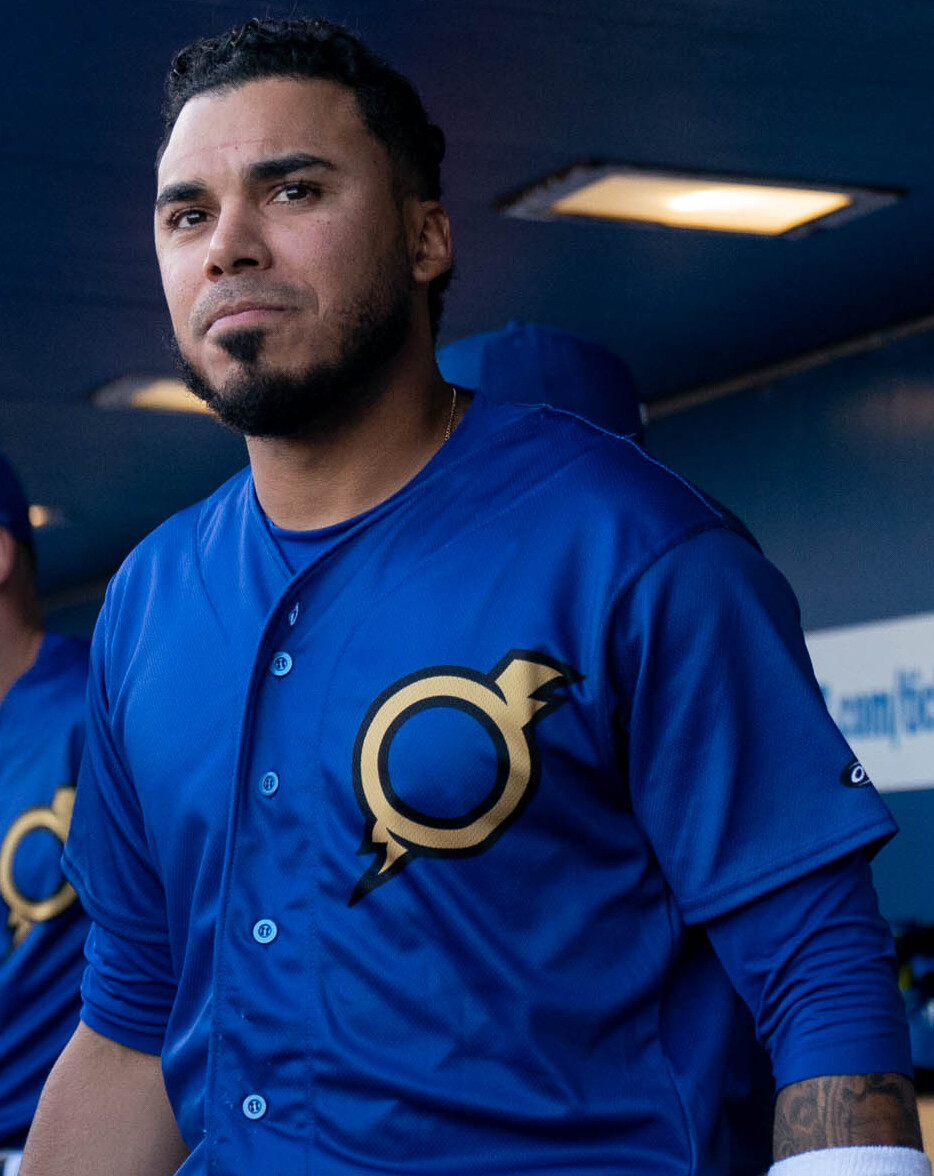
- Castro with the Omaha Storm Chasers in 2025

Kia Tigers – No. 26
- Left fielder / First baseman
- Born: November 30, 1993 (age 32); Caracas, Venezuela
- Bats: Left Throws: Right

Professional debut
- MLB: September 23, 2018, for the Detroit Tigers
- KBO: March 28, 2026, for the Kia Tigers

MLB statistics (through 2023 season)
- Batting average: .278
- Home runs: 16
- Runs batted in: 156

KBO statistics (through August 21, 2026)
- Batting average: .342
- Home runs: 13
- Runs batted in: 52
- Stats at Baseball Reference

Teams
- Detroit Tigers (2018–2022); Colorado Rockies (2023); Kia Tigers (2026–present)

Harold Arnaldo Castro (born November 30, 1993) is a Venezuelan professional baseball left fielder and first baseman for the Kia Tigers of the KBO League. He has previously played in Major League Baseball (MLB) for the Detroit Tigers and Colorado Rockies.

== Career ==
=== Detroit Tigers ===
==== Minor leagues ====
Castro signed with the Detroit Tigers in 2010 as a 16-year-old. He spent 2011 and 2012 with the Venezuelan Summer League Tigers, then a half-season with the rookie-level Gulf Coast League Tigers. In 2013, Castro played for the Single-A West Michigan Whitecaps and High-A Lakeland Flying Tigers, where he hit .245. He improved to a .286 average the next season, playing for the same two teams.

Castro spent all of the 2015 and 2016 regular seasons, and all but eight games of 2017, with the Double-A Erie SeaWolves. Castro's 2017 with Erie was his best at the level. He hit for a .290 average, with a .325 on-base percentage, one home run, 30 RBI, and 20 stolen bases.

In 2018, Castro played 74 games with the Triple-A Toledo Mud Hens and hit for a .257 average with two home runs and 17 RBI. He also played 29 games with the SeaWolves, where he had a .282 average with ten RBI.

==== 2018 ====
On September 21, 2018, the Tigers purchased Castro's minor league contract and added him to the roster after he had spent the last eight years in their minor league system. Since the Mud Hens season had already ended, Castro had to travel back to Detroit from his home in Venezuela.

He made his major league debut on September 23, as a pinch runner in the ninth inning of a game against the Kansas City Royals. He made his first MLB start on September 25, against the Minnesota Twins, where he recorded his first major league hit, a single in the eighth inning. He went 3-for-10 (.300) in his brief 2018 stint with the Tigers. Castro was removed from the 40-man roster and sent outright to Toledo on October 24, after which he elected free agency. He re-signed with Detroit to a minor league contract on October 31 that included an invitation to spring training.

==== 2019 ====
Castro opened the 2019 season with Toledo. On April 30, after hitting .353 for the Mud Hens, his contract was selected and he was recalled to the major league roster. He was optioned back to Toledo on May 13, then recalled again to the Tigers on June 4. On June 19, he hit his first career major league home run off Trevor Williams of the Pittsburgh Pirates. During the 2019 season, Castro played every defensive position except pitcher and catcher. In 354 at-bats for the Tigers, Castro hit .291 with 5 home runs and 38 RBI. Castro was named the Tigers' Rookie of the Year by Detroit Sports Media.

==== 2020 ====
Castro was expected to serve a bench role for the Tigers to start the 2020 season. He injured his hamstring and was placed on the injured list on August 19 (retroactive to the 18th). Overall, Castro batted .347 with no home runs and 3 RBIs in 22 games. He again played all four infield and all three outfield positions.

==== 2021 ====
On March 27, 2021, the Tigers announced that Castro had made the team's opening day roster. On April 5, 2021, Castro was called on to pitch the ninth inning in a 15–6 loss against the Minnesota Twins. He needed nine pitches to get out of the inning, allowing a walk. On May 15, Castro had his first career walk-off hit, an RBI single that scored JaCoby Jones in the 10th inning of the Tigers 9–8 win over the Chicago Cubs. Castro played in 106 games during the 2021 season, hitting .283 with 3 home runs and 37 RBI.

==== 2022 ====
On March 22, 2022, Castro signed a one-year, $1.275 million contract with the Tigers, avoiding salary arbitration. In a May 25 game against the Minnesota Twins, Castro hit a pair of solo home runs for the first multi-homer game of his career. He finished the 2022 season with a team-leading .271 batting average along with career-highs in hits (114), home runs (7), doubles (21), RBI (47), runs (37) and walks (17). On November 18, the Tigers non-tendered Castro, and he became a free agent.

=== Colorado Rockies ===
On January 19, 2023, Castro signed a minor league contract with the Colorado Rockies. On March 25, the Rockies announced that Castro had made the opening day roster and formally selected him to the 40-man roster. He played in 99 games for the Rockies, batting .252/.275/.314 with one home run and 31 RBI. On October 13, Castro was removed from the 40-man roster. Castro rejected an outright assignment and elected free agency.

=== Toros de Tijuana ===
On February 28, 2024, Castro signed with the Toros de Tijuana of the Mexican League. In 84 games for Tijuana, he slashed .320/.366/.447 with six home runs, 30 RBI, and three stolen bases. Castro became a free agent following the season.

=== Kansas City Royals ===
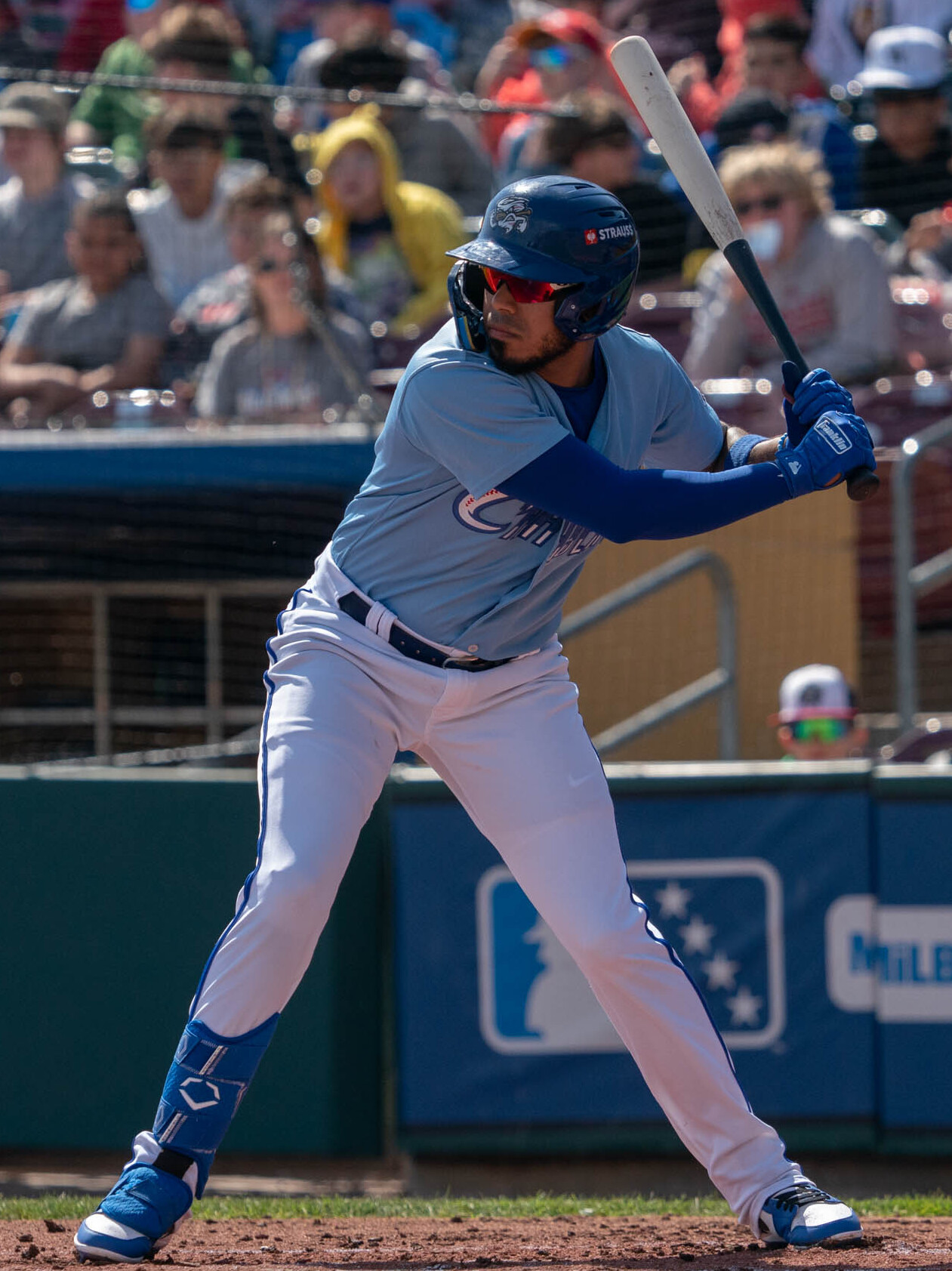
Castro with the Omaha Storm Chasers in 2025

On January 18, 2025, Castro signed a minor league contract with the Kansas City Royals. He received an invitation to spring training and began the season with the Triple-A Omaha Storm Chasers. Castro made 101 appearances split between the rookie-level Arizona Complex League Royals and Triple-A Omaha Storm Chasers, hitting a combined .303/.353/.531 with 21 home runs, 65 RBI, and eight stolen bases. Castro was released by the Royals organization on September 30.

=== Kia Tigers ===
On December 24, 2025, Castro signed a one-year, $1 million contract with the Kia Tigers of the KBO League.

== Personal life ==
Castro is married and has a son.
