= Blair Calvo =

American baseball player (born 1996)

Free agent
- Pitcher
- Born: February 27, 1996 (age 30); Jacksonville, Florida, U.S.
- Bats: Right Throws: Right

MLB debut
- May 30, 2023, for the Colorado Rockies

MLB statistics (through 2023 season)
- Win–loss record: 0–0
- Earned run average: 0.00
- Strikeouts: 0
- Stats at Baseball Reference

Teams
- Colorado Rockies (2023)

Blair Matthew Calvo (born February 27, 1996) is an American professional baseball pitcher who is a free agent. He has previously played in Major League Baseball (MLB) for the Colorado Rockies.

== Career ==
Calvo played college baseball at Eastern Florida State College, Flagler College, and the University of Pittsburgh. He was drafted by the Texas Rangers in the 31st round of the 2016 Major League Baseball draft, but did not sign. He underwent Tommy John surgery in 2017, and missed the entire season.

=== Colorado Rockies ===
After his senior season at Flagler College Calvo was drafted by the Colorado Rockies in the 23rd round of the 2019 Major League Baseball draft and signed. He made his professional debut that year with the rookie-level Grand Junction Rockies. Calvo did not play in a game in 2020 due to the cancellation of the minor league season because of the COVID-19 pandemic. He returned to action in 2021 with the Single-A Fresno Grizzlies, making 33 appearances and logging a 4.54 ERA with 75 strikeouts and 2 saves in 71 1/3 innings pitched.

In a May 31, 2022, outing against the Reading Fightin Phils, Calvo was visited on the mound by catcher Willie MacIver, manager Chris Denorfia, and athletic trainer Kelsey Branstetter after he was visibly in distress and unable to catch his breath. He was transported to the hospital and diagnosed with ventricular tachycardia. He spent the majority of the 2022 season with the Double-A Hartford Yard Goats, also making two appearances for the rookie-level Arizona Complex League Rockies. In 29 appearances for Hartford, Calvo registered a 3.09 ERA with 47 strikeouts in 35.0 innings pitched.

On November 15, 2022, the Rockies added Calvo to their 40-man roster to protect him from the Rule 5 draft. Calvo was optioned to the Triple-A Albuquerque Isotopes to begin the 2023 season. In 20 appearances, he struggled to an 8.50 ERA with 26 strikeouts and 3 saves in 18.0 innings pitched. On May 30, 2023, Calvo was promoted to the major leagues for the first time. He made his MLB debut the following day against the Arizona Diamondbacks, pitching a scoreless eighth inning on only eleven pitches. Calvo was designated for assignment by the Rockies on June 15, following the promotion of Jorge Alfaro.

=== Detroit Tigers ===
On June 18, 2023, Calvo was traded to the Detroit Tigers in exchange for cash considerations, and was optioned to the Triple–A Toledo Mud Hens. On September 3, Calvo was removed from the 40–man roster and sent outright to Triple–A Toledo. In 29 total appearances for Toledo, he compiled a 6.95 ERA with 36 strikeouts across 33 2/3 innings pitched.

Calvo was assigned to the Double–A Erie SeaWolves to begin the 2024 season, compiling a 9.00 ERA across three appearances. On May 24, 2024, it was announced that Calvo would miss the remainder of the season after undergoing surgery to repair a labrum tear in his right shoulder.

Calvo split the 2025 season between the rookie-level Florida Complex League Tigers, Single-A Lakeland Flying Tigers, High-A West Michigan Whitecaps, Erie, and Toledo; in 30 appearances for the five affiliates, he compiled a 1-1 record and 5.40 ERA with 48 strikeouts and five saves over 40 innings of work. Calvo elected free agency following the season on November 6, 2025.

=== Conspiradores de Querétaro ===
On April 22, 2026, Calvo signed with the Conspiradores de Querétaro of the Mexican League. He made two appearances for the Conspiradores, but allowed seven earned runs on seven hits across 2/3 of an inning pitched. Calvo was released by Querétaro on April 25.
