= Karl Kauffmann =

American baseball player (born 1997)

Free agent
- Pitcher
- Born: August 15, 1997 (age 28); Bloomfield Hills, Michigan, U.S.
- Bats: Right Throws: Right

MLB debut
- May 19, 2023, for the Colorado Rockies

MLB statistics (through 2023 season)
- Win–loss record: 2–5
- Earned run average: 8.23
- Strikeouts: 16
- Stats at Baseball Reference

Teams
- Colorado Rockies (2023)

Karl John Kauffmann (born August 15, 1997) is an American professional baseball pitcher who is a free agent. He has previously played in Major League Baseball (MLB) for the Colorado Rockies.

== Amateur career ==
Kauffmann attended Brother Rice High School in Bloomfield Hills, Michigan and played college baseball at the University of Michigan. In 2017 and 2018, he played collegiate summer baseball with the Yarmouth–Dennis Red Sox of the Cape Cod Baseball League.

== Professional career ==
The Colorado Rockies selected Kauffmann in the second round of the 2019 Major League Baseball draft. He did not play in a game in 2020 due to the cancellation of the minor league season because of the COVID-19 pandemic.

Kauffmann made his professional debut in 2021 with the High-A Spokane Indians before being promoted to the Double-A Hartford Yard Goats. In 21 combined games (20 starts), Kauffmann struggled to a 3-12 record and 6.90 ERA with 71 strikeouts in 91 1/3 innings pitched. He started the 2022 season with Hartford, before later being promoted to the Triple-A Albuquerque Isotopes. In 28 cumulative starts, Kauffmann pitched to a 9-9 record and 4.96 ERA with 144 strikeouts in 141 2/3 innings of work.

Kauffmann was assigned to Triple-A Albuquerque to begin the 2023 season, where he struggled to a 2-3 record and 7.78 ERA with 26 strikeouts across eight starts. On May 19, 2023, the Rockies selected Kauffmann's contract and promoted him to the major leagues for the first time to start against the Texas Rangers that night. In 11 games (3 starts) for the Rockies, he struggled immensely to a 2–5 record and 8.23 ERA with 16 strikeouts in 35 innings of work. Following the season on October 18, Kauffmann was removed from the 40–man roster and sent outright to Triple–A Albuquerque.

Kauffmann made 29 starts for Albuquerque during the 2024 campaign, but struggled to a 5-13 record and 8.95 ERA with 74 strikeouts across 129 2/3 innings pitched.

Kauffmann made 42 appearances (two starts) for Albuquerque in 2025, posting a 2-3 record and 5.51 ERA with 62 strikeouts and one save across 81 2/3 innings pitched. He elected free agency following the season on November 6, 2025.
