= Noah Davis (baseball) =

American baseball player (born 1997)

Free agent
- Pitcher
- Born: April 22, 1997 (age 29); Newport Beach, California, U.S.
- Bats: Left Throws: Right

MLB debut
- October 5, 2022, for the Colorado Rockies

MLB statistics (through 2025 season)
- Win–loss record: 0–6
- Earned run average: 9.53
- Strikeouts: 58
- Stats at Baseball Reference

Teams
- Colorado Rockies (2022–2024); Los Angeles Dodgers (2025); Minnesota Twins (2025)

Noah Dylan Davis (born April 22, 1997) is an American professional baseball pitcher who is a free agent. He has previously played in Major League Baseball (MLB) for the Colorado Rockies, Los Angeles Dodgers, and Minnesota Twins. Davis played college baseball at the University of California, Santa Barbara, and was selected by the Cincinnati Reds in the 11th round of the 2018 MLB draft. He made his MLB debut in 2022 with the Rockies.

== Early life and education ==
Davis was born in Newport Beach, California, to Eric and Ashley Davis. He attended Huntington Beach High School in Huntington Beach, California. He was First Team All-Sunset League in 2014 and 2015. He was 12–0 with a 1.27 earned run average (ERA) in his junior season, in which he was First Team All-California and All-County, and won the 2015 CIF Southern Section Division I Championship, throwing a complete-game four-hitter with 10 strikeouts in the title game.

Davis enrolled at the University of California, Santa Barbara, where he played college baseball for the UC Santa Barbara Gauchos while majoring in environmental studies. In 2016 he was named Big West Freshman of the Year. In 2017, he played collegiate summer baseball with the Cotuit Kettleers of the Cape Cod Baseball League. In 2018, he pitched in three games before undergoing Tommy John surgery in March. He was still selected by the Cincinnati Reds in the 11th round of the 2018 Major League Baseball draft, and signed for a signing bonus of $127,500.

== Professional career ==
=== Cincinnati Reds ===
Davis made his professional debut, after rehabbing from his surgery, in June 2019 with the rookie–level Arizona League Reds, and was promoted to the Billings Mustangs during the season. In 13 starts split between the two affiliates, he compiled a 1–3 record and 3.19 ERA with 35 strikeouts over 42 1/3 innings pitched. Davis did not play in a game in 2020 due to the cancellation of the minor league season because of the COVID-19 pandemic. He began 2021 with the High–A Dayton Dragons.

=== Colorado Rockies ===
On July 28, 2021, the Reds traded Davis and pitcher Case Williams to the Colorado Rockies in exchange for Mychal Givens. He was assigned to the Spokane Indians, where he ended the season. Over 19 starts between Dayton and Spokane, he went 6–7 with two complete games and a 3.60 ERA, 76 hits, and 106 strikeouts in 100 innings, a 9.5 K/9 rate. The Rockies added him to their 40-man roster after the 2021 season.

Davis began the 2022 season pitching for the Hartford Yard Goats of the Double-A Eastern League, with whom he was 8–8 with a 5.54 ERA in 26 starts, in which he had 152 strikeouts (3rd in the league) in 133 1/3 innings (10.3 strikeouts/9 IP). He started one game for the Triple-A Albuquerque Isotopes of the Pacific Coast League, and was 0–0 with a 1.93 ERA. On September 16, 2022, the Rockies called him up to the major leagues. Colorado manager Bud Black said that Davis could be a starter for the Rockies in the near future, if he can adapt to major league hitters. However, he was optioned back to Albuquerque on September 24 without making an appearance, briefly becoming a phantom ballplayer. On October 4, Davis was recalled back to the major league roster. He made his major league debut on the next day, the final day of the season, against the Los Angeles Dodgers.

Davis was optioned to Triple-A Albuquerque to begin the 2023 season. In 8 appearances (6 starts) for the Rockies, he posted an 0–4 record and 8.70 ERA with 26 strikeouts across 30 innings of work. Davis was again optioned to Triple–A Albuquerque to begin the 2024 season. In 9 appearances for Colorado, he worked to a 5.75 ERA with 15 strikeouts across 20 1/3 innings pitched. On September 1, 2024, Davis was removed from the 40–man roster and sent outright to Albuquerque. He elected free agency following the season on November 4.

=== Los Angeles Dodgers ===
On December 21, 2024, Davis signed a minor league contract with the Boston Red Sox. At the end of spring training, on March 27, 2025, Davis was traded to the Los Angeles Dodgers in exchange for cash considerations. He was subsequently added to the team's 40-man roster and optioned to the Triple-A Oklahoma City Comets. In a game on July 4, Davis allowed 10 runs to score in the sixth inning of a game against the Houston Astros. He tied the Los Angeles Dodgers record for most runs allowed in a single inning by a relief pitcher, matching the mark set by Willard Hunter on April 16, 1962. In five appearances for Los Angeles, Davis struggled to a 19.50 ERA with eight strikeouts across six innings pitched. On July 11, he was designated for assignment by the Dodgers.

=== Minnesota Twins ===
On July 14, 2025, Davis was traded to the Minnesota Twins in exchange for cash considerations. In four appearances for Minnesota, he struggled to an 0-1 record and 16.20 ERA with seven strikeouts across five innings of work. On September 5, Davis was removed from the 40-man roster and sent outright to the Triple-A St. Paul Saints. He elected free agency on September 29.

=== Pittsburgh Pirates ===
On January 5, 2026, Davis signed a minor league contract with the Pittsburgh Pirates. In 29 games (25 starts) with Triple-A Indianapolis Indians he threw 123.2 innings going 2-11 with a 6.11 ERA with 109 strikeouts and one save. He elected free agency on November 2.

== Pitching repertoire ==
As of January 2026, his pitching repertoire with a short-arm, low-slot delivery was a fastball averaging about 95 mph, a cutter about 88 mph, a screwball about 85 mph, a sweeper about 80 mph, and a sinker about 94 mph.
