= Nolan Jones =

American baseball player (born 1998)

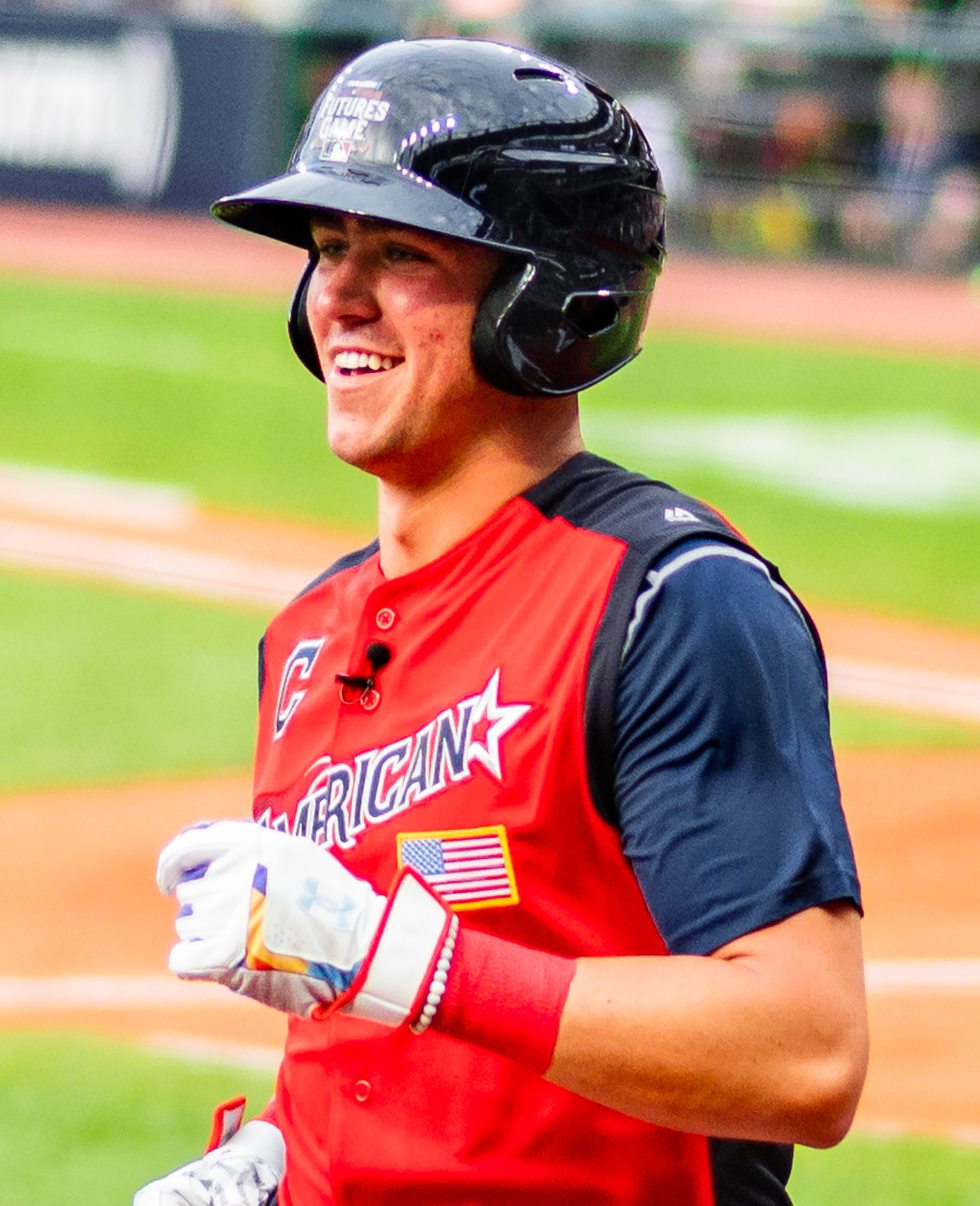
- Jones during the 2019 All-Star Futures Game

Free agent
- Outfielder
- Born: May 7, 1998 (age 28); Langhorne, Pennsylvania, U.S.
- Bats: Left Throws: Right

MLB debut
- July 8, 2022, for the Cleveland Guardians

MLB statistics (through 2025 season)
- Batting average: .247
- Home runs: 30
- Runs batted in: 137
- Stolen bases: 33
- Stats at Baseball Reference

Teams
- Cleveland Guardians (2022); Colorado Rockies (2023–2024); Cleveland Guardians (2025)

Nolan Allen Jones (born May 7, 1998) is an American professional baseball outfielder who is a free agent. He has previously played in Major League Baseball (MLB) for the Cleveland Guardians and Colorado Rockies.

== Amateur career ==
Jones attended Holy Ghost Preparatory School in Cornwells Heights, Bensalem, Pennsylvania. He played shortstop in high school. Jones hit a home run in his final high school at-bat. He committed to the University of Virginia to play college baseball.

== Professional career ==
=== Cleveland Indians / Guardians ===
Jones was considered a top prospect for the 2016 Major League Baseball draft. The Cleveland Indians selected Jones in the second round of the draft. On July 1, Jones signed with the Indians for a $2.25 million signing bonus.

Jones struck out swinging on his first career at-bat for the Arizona League Indians. He finished his first professional season with a .257 batting average over 109 at bats. Jones spent 2017 with the Mahoning Valley Scrappers where he batted .317 with four home runs, 33 RBIs, and 18 doubles over 62 games. He began the 2018 season with the Lake County Captains before being promoted to the Lynchburg Hillcats, slashing a combined .283/.405/.466 with 19 home runs and 66 RBIs over 120 games between both teams.

Jones returned to Lynchburg to begin 2019 and was promoted to the Akron RubberDucks during the season. He was named to the 2019 All-Star Futures Game. Over 126 games between both teams, he slashed .272/.409/.442 with 15 home runs and 63 RBIs. He led the minor leagues in walks with 96. He was also selected to play in the Arizona Fall League for the Mesa Solar Sox following the season. However, he left the league early after aggravating a previous hand injury. He did not play a minor league game in 2020 due to the cancellation of the season. Cleveland selected Jones' contract on November 20, 2020. Jones spent the 2021 season with the Columbus Clippers with whom he slashed .238/.356/.431 with 13 home runs, 48 RBIs, and 25 doubles over 99 games.

The Guardians recalled Jones from the minor leagues on July 8, 2022. He made his major league debut that same day against the Kansas City Royals. In the game, Jones collected his first career hit, an RBI double off of Royals starter Brady Singer. The next day, Jones hit his first career home run, a 450 foot shot off of Jackson Kowar.

=== Colorado Rockies ===
On November 15, 2022, Jones was traded to the Colorado Rockies in exchange for Juan Brito. Jones was optioned to the Triple-A Albuquerque Isotopes to begin the 2023 season. In 106 games for Colorado, he batted .297/.389/.542 with new career–highs in home runs (20), RBI (62), and stolen bases (20). He placed fourth in the 2023 National League Rookie of the Year balloting.

Jones made 79 appearances for the Rockies during the 2024 campaign, batting .227/.321/.320 with three home runs, 28 RBI, and five stolen bases.

=== Cleveland Guardians (second stint) ===
On March 22, 2025, Jones was traded back to the Cleveland Guardians in exchange for utility player Tyler Freeman. He made 136 appearances for the Guardians during the regular season, batting .211/.296/.304 with five home runs, 34 RBI, and eight stolen bases.

On March 20, 2026, Jones was removed from the 40-man roster and sent outright to the Triple-A Columbus Clippers. He made 52 appearances for Columbus, batting .275/.385/.460 with eight home runs, 31 RBI, and three stolen bases.

=== Chicago White Sox ===
On June 11, 2026, Jones was traded to the Chicago White Sox in exchange for cash considerations; he was subsequently assigned to the Triple-A Charlotte Knights. Jones made 39 appearances for Triple–A Charlotte, slashing .227/.329/.417 with six home runs, 28 RBI, and eight stolen bases.

=== Seattle Mariners ===
On August 1, 2026, Jones (alongside Seranthony Domínguez and Boston Smith) was traded to the Seattle Mariners in exchange for Luis Castillo. In 31 games with Triple-A Tacoma Rainiers he batted .248/.338/.444 with 5 home runs, 21 RBIs and 4 stolen bases. He elected free agency on September 29.

== Personal life ==
His brother, Peyton Jones, played Division I ice hockey for four years at Penn State and was signed by the Colorado Eagles of the AHL. He is currently a goaltender for a German club of the DEL. His younger sister, Liana Jones, also attended Penn State where she played four years of Division I softball.

In August 2024, Jones' fiancée, Morgan Gouger, gave birth to the couple's first child.
