= Gavin Hollowell =

American baseball player (born 1997)

Chicago Cubs – No. 46
- Pitcher
- Born: November 4, 1997 (age 28); Somerset, New Jersey, U.S.
- Bats: Right Throws: Right

MLB debut
- September 19, 2022, for the Colorado Rockies

MLB statistics (through 2026 season)
- Win–loss record: 2–2
- Earned run average: 5.05
- Strikeouts: 64
- Stats at Baseball Reference

Teams
- Colorado Rockies (2022–2023); Chicago Cubs (2024–present)

Gavin Ernest Hollowell (born November 4, 1997) is an American professional baseball pitcher for the Chicago Cubs of Major League Baseball (MLB). He has previously played in MLB for the Colorado Rockies. He made his MLB debut in 2022.

== Amateur career ==
A native of Montgomery Township, Somerset County, New Jersey, Hollowell attended Montgomery High School and St. John's University, where he played college baseball for the St. John's Red Storm. In 2018, Hollowell played collegiate summer baseball with the Hyannis Harbor Hawks of the Cape Cod Baseball League.

== Professional career ==
=== Colorado Rockies ===
The Colorado Rockies selected Hollowell in the sixth round, with the 189th overall selection, of the 2019 Major League Baseball draft. He made his professional debut with the rookie-level Grand Junction Rockies. Hollowell did not play in a game in 2020 due to the cancellation of the minor league season because of the COVID-19 pandemic.

Hollowell spent the 2021 season split between the rookie-level Arizona Complex League Rockies and Single-A Fresno Grizzlies. In 24 combined appearances, he posted a 3-0 record and 2.25 ERA with 33 strikeouts and 5 saves in 24.0 innings pitched. Hollowell began the 2022 season with the Double-A Hartford Yard Goats, pitching to a 4-2 record and 3.14 ERA with 64 strikeouts and 16 saves in 42 appearances.

On September 18, 2022, Hollowell was promoted to the major leagues for the first time. He made 6 appearances for Colorado in his rookie campaign, posting an 0-2 record and 7.71 ERA with 8 strikeouts in 7.0 innings pitched.

Hollowell was optioned to the Triple-A Albuquerque Isotopes to begin the 2023 season. In 26 games for the Rockies, he logged a 5.88 ERA with 32 strikeouts across 33 2/3 innings pitched. Hollowell was again optioned to Triple–A Albuquerque to begin the 2024 season. In six appearances, he struggled to a 16.62 ERA with six strikeouts across 4 1/3 innings.

=== Arizona Diamondbacks ===
On June 18, 2024, Hollowell was claimed off waivers by the Arizona Diamondbacks. In 18 games for the Triple–A Reno Aces, he logged a 3.63 ERA with 24 strikeouts over 17 1/3 innings pitched. Hollowell was designated for assignment by the Diamondbacks on August 20.

=== Chicago Cubs ===
On August 23, 2024, Hollowell was claimed off waivers by the Chicago Cubs. He made one scoreless appearance for Chicago, striking out one batter across 1 1/3 innings pitched.

Hollowell was optioned to the Triple-A Iowa Cubs to begin the 2025 season. He pitched in seven games for Chicago during the regular season, recording a 4.82 ERA with 10 strikeouts across 9 1/3 innings pitched.

Hollowell was optioned to Triple-A Iowa to begin the 2026 season.
