= Ezequiel Tovar =

Venezuelan baseball player (born 2001)

Colorado Rockies – No. 14
- Shortstop
- Born: August 1, 2001 (age 25); Maracay, Venezuela
- Bats: Right Throws: Right

MLB debut
- September 23, 2022, for the Colorado Rockies

MLB statistics (through 2026 season)
- Batting average: .250
- Home runs: 64
- Runs batted in: 230
- Stats at Baseball Reference

Teams
- Colorado Rockies (2022–present)

Career highlights and awards
- Gold Glove Award (2024)
Medals
Men's baseball
Representing Venezuela
World Baseball Classic
Gold medal – first place	2026 Miami	Team

Ezequiel Jesús Tovar (born August 1, 2001) is a Venezuelan professional baseball shortstop for the Colorado Rockies of Major League Baseball (MLB). He made his MLB debut in 2022.

== Career ==
=== Minor leagues ===
Tovar signed with the Colorado Rockies as an international free agent on August 1, 2017, receiving an $800,000 signing bonus.

Tovar made his professional debut with the Dominican Summer League Rockies in 2018, batting .262 with 11 RBIs over 35 games. He was a switch hitter in 2018, but converted to batting only from the right side at the encouragement of Rockies scouts. He began 2019 with the Low-A Boise Hawks before moving down to rookie-level Grand Junction Rockies shortly after his 18th birthday on August 1. He was assigned to Boise because a state labor law prevented him from working full-time as a 17-year-old in Grand Junction, Colorado. With both Rocky Mountain teams in 2019, he slashed .253/.318/.322 with two home runs, 16 RBIs, and 17 stolen bases in 73 games.

When the 2020 season was halted due to the COVID-19 pandemic, Tovar spent a year living in Scottsdale, Arizona, since his native Venezuela closed its borders. He participated in the Rockies instructional league program in Arizona in September 2020. He started the 2021 season with the Single-A Fresno Grizzlies and was promoted to the High-A Spokane Indians at the beginning of August. He slashed .287/.322/.475 with 15 home runs, 72 RBIs, 30 doubles, and 24 stolen bases for both teams. After the season, he played for the Salt River Rafters in the Arizona Fall League, where he tied for the team lead with 3 home runs in 25 games. He was added to the Rockies 40-man roster on November 19 to protect him from the Rule 5 draft.

Tovar began the 2022 season with the Double-A Hartford Yard Goats, playing in 66 games and hitting .318/.386/.546 with 13 home runs, 47 RBI, and 17 stolen bases. He was the Eastern League Player of the Month in April. He suffered a hip injury that kept him out for two and a half months, costing him a chance to play in the All-Star Futures Game. He returned to action with the Triple-A Albuquerque Isotopes on September 15. In 5 games with Albuquerque, he hit .333 with one home run.

=== Major leagues ===
After his brief stint with Albuquerque, the Rockies promoted Tovar to the major leagues. He made his major league debut on September 23, 2022, notching his first career hit off of Sean Manaea of the San Diego Padres. He was the youngest ever Rockies position player to make his MLB debut. On October 5, the final day of the regular season, Tovar hit his first career home run, a solo shot off of Los Angeles Dodgers starter Clayton Kershaw. In nine games with the Rockies in 2022, Tovar hit .212 with one home run and one error.

Tovar entered 2023, his rookie season, as the Rockies Opening Day starting shortstop and a consensus top 25 prospect. He started slow at the plate, batting. 213/.257/.338 through May 15. He improved as the season progressed, finishing with a .253/.287/.408 slash line with 15 home runs and 11 stolen bases in 153 games. He had his first walk-off hit with the Rockies on May 25 in a victory over the Miami Marlins. His 37 doubles led NL rookies and tied Todd Helton for the franchise rookie season record. He was a finalist for the Gold Glove Award, losing out to Dansby Swanson.

On March 26, 2024, Tovar signed a seven-year, $63.5 million contract extension with the Rockies that includes an eighth year, $23 million club option for the 2031 season.

In 2024, he led the NL with 655 at bats and 45 doubles. He batted .269/.295/.469 with 83 runs, 26 home runs, and 78 RBIs. He had issues with plate discipline. He had the second-lowest walk rate among qualified hitters, drawing a walk in only 3.3 percent of plate appearances. He was second in the NL with 200 strikeouts and had the ninth-highest strikeout rate in the majors, fanning in 28.8 percent of plate appearances. Tovar won the Gold Glove Award at shortstop. He also received downballot votes for NL MVP from both Colorado voters, finishing tied for 19th in overall voting.

On May 17, 2025, Tovar recorded his first five-hit game as he went 5-for-6 with a home run, a triple, and two RBI as the Rockies upset the Arizona Diamondbacks 14–12.

Tovar missed much of the 2025 season with injuries, first to his left hip and later to his oblique. He appeared in 95 games (compared to 157 in 2024) and finished with a slashline of .253/.294/.400 (83 OPS+), including nine home runs.

== Personal life ==
Tovar's wife, Laura, gave birth to the couple's first child on Father's Day, June 18, 2023. Tovar began playing with a baby blue glove after becoming a father.
