= Cole Tucker =

American baseball player (born 1996)

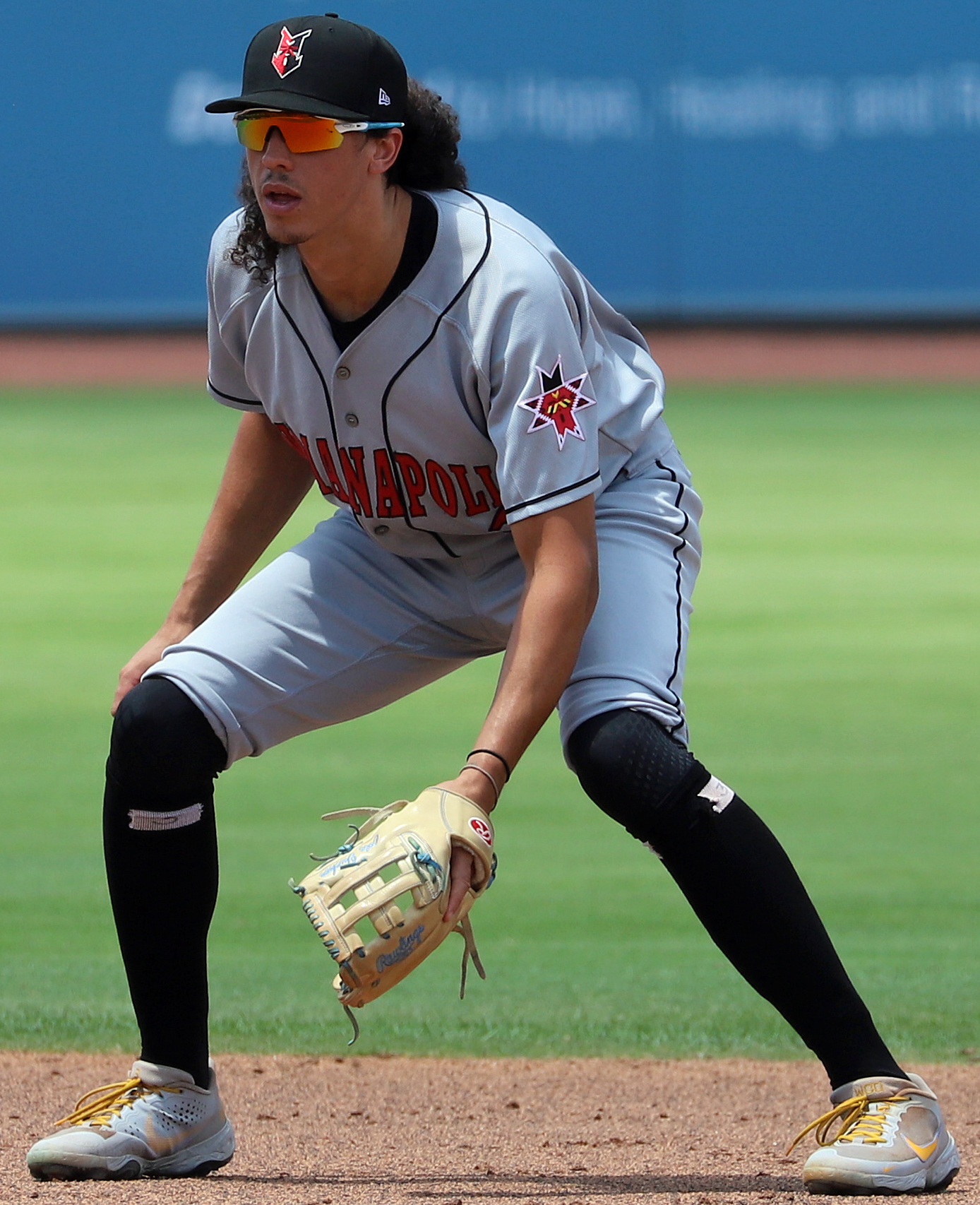
- Tucker with the Indianapolis Indians in 2021
- Shortstop / Outfielder
- Born: July 3, 1996 (age 30); Phoenix, Arizona, U.S.
- Batted: Switch Threw: Right

MLB debut
- April 20, 2019, for the Pittsburgh Pirates

Last MLB appearance
- June 16, 2024, for the Los Angeles Angels

MLB statistics
- Batting average: .216
- Home runs: 5
- Runs batted in: 40
- Stats at Baseball Reference

Teams
- Pittsburgh Pirates (2019–2022); Colorado Rockies (2023); Los Angeles Angels (2024)
Medals
Men's baseball
Representing United States
18U Baseball World Cup
Gold medal – first place	2013 Taichung	Team

Cole Bryson Tucker (born July 3, 1996) is an American former professional baseball shortstop and outfielder. He played in Major League Baseball (MLB) for the Pittsburgh Pirates, Colorado Rockies, and Los Angeles Angels.

== Amateur career ==
Tucker attended Mountain Pointe High School in Phoenix, Arizona, where he played for the school's baseball team. He played for the United States national baseball team in the 2013 18U Baseball World Cup. He committed to play college baseball at the University of Arizona.

== Professional career ==
=== Pittsburgh Pirates ===
The Pittsburgh Pirates selected Tucker in the first round, with the 24th overall selection, of the 2014 Major League Baseball draft. He signed on June 12, 2014 for a signing bonus worth $1,800,000, and spent 2014 with the Gulf Coast League Pirates, where he batted .267 with a .724 OPS. He had been committed to play college baseball for the Arizona Wildcats. Tucker spent 2015 with the West Virginia Power where he posted a .293 batting average along with 25 stolen bases and 13 doubles. Tucker returned to the Power in 2016, and was later promoted to the Bradenton Marauders, where he batted a combined .242 with two home runs and 27 runs batted in (RBIs) between both teams. In 2017, he began the season with Bradenton and was promoted to the Altoona Curve in July. In 110 total games, Tucker posted a .275 batting average, six home runs, 50 RBIs, and 47 stolen bases in the 2017 campaign.

MLB.com ranked Tucker as Pittsburgh's fifth-best prospect going into the 2018 season. The Pirates added him to their 40-man roster after the season. He opened the 2019 season with the Indianapolis Indians. On April 20, he was called up to the major league roster. He made his major league debut that afternoon versus the San Francisco Giants. During that game Tucker got his first major league hit in his third at bat, hitting a two-run home run off Derek Holland over the center field wall at PNC Park to give the Pirates a 3–1 lead. The home run became the game-winning hit after the game was called due to rain. In June, the Pirates optioned Tucker to Indianapolis.

In 2020, the Pirates played Tucker as an outfielder, as he slashed .211/.266/.361. The Pirates optioned Tucker to Indianapolis to start the 2021 season. He played in 13 games for the Pirates in May and July, and another 30 games after he was recalled in August. In 2021, he batted .222/.298/.342 in 43 games.

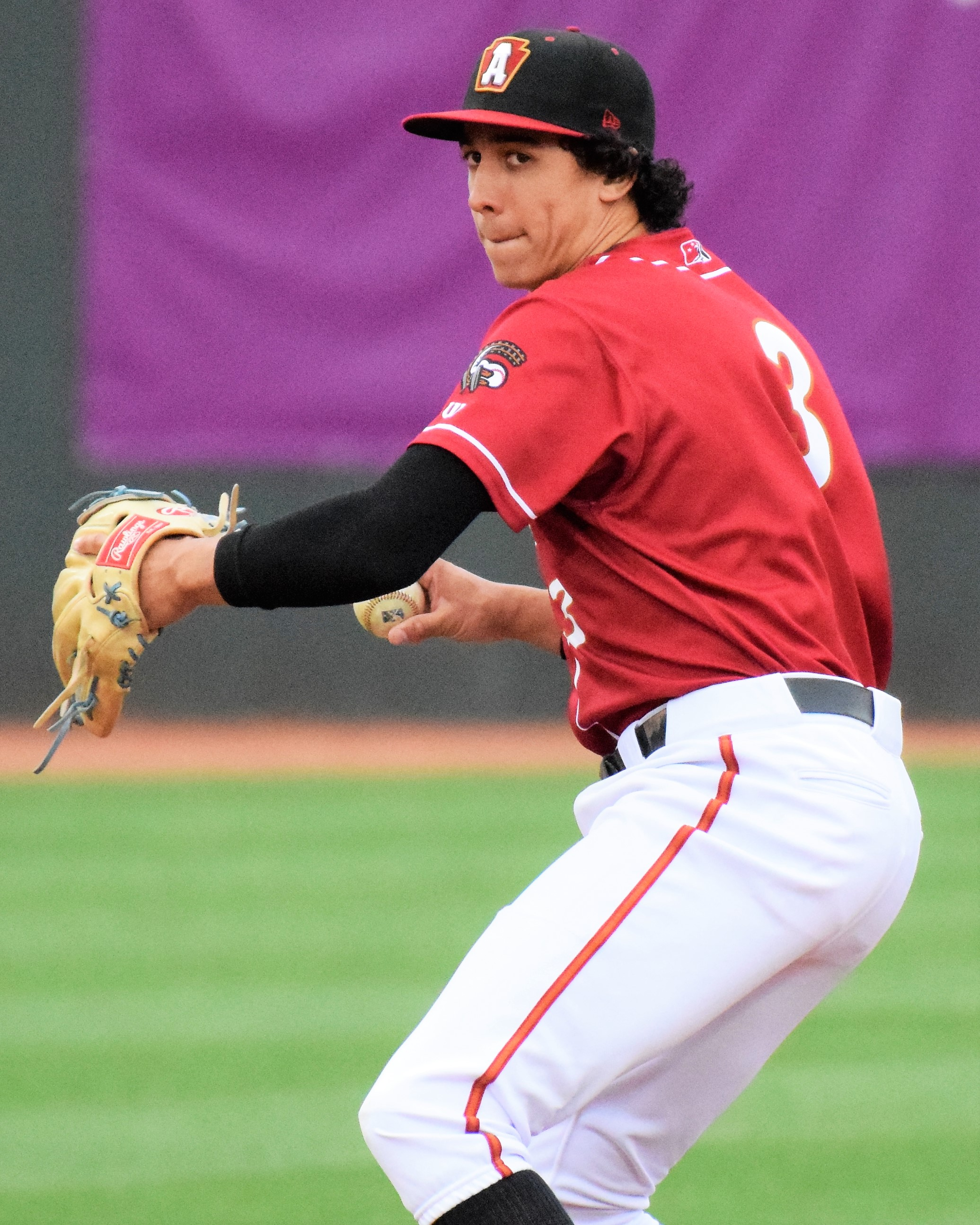
Tucker with the Altoona Curve in 2018

In 2022, Tucker appeared in 18 games for the Pirates, playing second base, shortstop, and right field. He batted .175 before being optioned to Indianapolis on May 12. The Pirates designated Tucker for assignment on May 30.

=== Arizona Diamondbacks ===
On June 5, 2022, the Arizona Diamondbacks claimed Tucker off of waivers and optioned him to the Reno Aces of the Triple-A Pacific Coast League. On July 8, he was removed from the 40-man roster and sent outright to the Triple-A Reno Aces. In 35 games for Reno, Tucker slashed .237/.297/.325 with two home runs, 13 RBI, and four stolen bases. He elected free agency following the season on November 10.

=== Colorado Rockies ===
On December 7, 2022, Tucker signed a minor league deal with the Colorado Rockies. He began the 2023 season with the Triple–A Albuquerque Isotopes, playing in 58 games and hitting .311/.420/.460 with 5 home runs and 34 RBI. On August 7, 2023, the Rockies selected Tucker's contract, adding him to the major league roster. In 3 games for Colorado, he went 3–for–7 with 2 RBI and a walk. On August 14, he was designated for assignment following Sean Bouchard's activation from the injured list. He cleared waivers and was sent outright to Albuquerque on August 17. On September 5, Tucker was selected back to the major league roster. He was designated for assignment a second time on September 11, after Kris Bryant was activated from the injured list. Tucker was again outrighted to Albuquerque after clearing waivers on September 14. On October 4, Tucker elected free agency.

=== Los Angeles Angels ===
On January 28, 2024, Tucker signed a minor league contract with the Seattle Mariners. Unable to make the Mariners roster during spring training, he was granted his release on March 18.

On April 10, 2024, Tucker signed a minor league contract with the Los Angeles Angels. In 10 games for the Triple–A Salt Lake Bees, he batted .313 with one home run and five RBI. On April 29, Tucker had his contract selected to the major league roster. In 24 games, he hit .180/.263/.300 with three RBI and three stolen bases. On June 17, Tucker was designated for assignment by the Angels. He cleared waivers and was sent outright to Salt Lake on June 20. Tucker elected free agency on October 1.

On May 20, 2025, Tucker announced his retirement from professional baseball.

== Personal life ==
Tucker grew up as a fan of the Arizona Diamondbacks. His father is African American and his mother is European American. His brother Carson was selected by the Cleveland Indians in the first round of the 2020 Major League Baseball draft.

In 2020, Tucker began dating actress Vanessa Hudgens. The pair married on December 2, 2023, in Tulum, Mexico. The couple had their first child in late June or early July 2024. On July 12, 2025, they announced they were expecting a second child.

Tucker is a fan of the Backyard Baseball video game series. On December 31, 2019, he tweeted a photo of himself showing a fan art painting commissioned from Pittsburgh-based artist Cody Sabol of some of the Backyard Kids and several then-current MLB players (including Tucker himself) as kids in the series sitting on bleachers. In June 2026, it was announced that he would be voicing Ricky Johnson in the Backyard Baseball reboot.
