= 1993 Colorado Rockies season =

1993 Colorado Rockies
- League: National League
- Division: West
- Ballpark: Mile High Stadium
- City: Denver, Colorado
- Record: 67–95 (.414)
- Divisional place: 6th
- Owner: Jerry McMorris
- General manager: Bob Gebhard
- Manager: Don Baylor
- Television: KWGN-TV (Duane Kuiper, Charlie Jones)
- Radio: KOA (AM) (Wayne Hagin, Jeff Kingery); KCUV (Francisco Gomez)
- Stats: ESPN.com; Baseball Reference

The 1993 Colorado Rockies season was the inaugural season for the expansion team in Major League Baseball (MLB) located in Denver, Colorado, which were established as a member of the National League (NL), competing in the NL West division, and based at Mile High Stadium. The first manager named for the Rockies was Don Baylor.

First baseman Andrés Galarraga represented the Rockies at the MLB All-Star Game, held at Oriole Park at Camden Yards.

Colorado finished with a record of 67–95, in sixth place and 37 games behind the NL West division-champion and NL pennant-winning Atlanta Braves, ahead of only the San Diego Padres. At Mile High Stadium, better known as the home of the Denver Broncos of the National Football League (NFL), the Rockies sold 4,483,350 tickets to their home games, setting the Major League record for attendance, which still stands as of the 2023 season.

Galarraga concluded the season winning the NL batting title with a .370 batting average, also leading the major leagues. Shortstop Vinny Castilla was the last player from the Rockies' inaugural season to retire, playing his last game at the end of 2006.

== Offseason ==
- November 9, 1992: Neifi Pérez was signed as an amateur free agent by the Colorado Rockies.
- November 16, 1992: Andrés Galarraga was signed as a free agent by the Colorado Rockies.
- November 17, 1992: Dante Bichette was traded by the Milwaukee Brewers to the Colorado Rockies for Kevin Reimer.
- December 7, 1992: Bruce Ruffin was signed as a free agent by the Colorado Rockies.
- December 7, 1992: Bryn Smith was signed as a free agent by the Colorado Rockies.

=== Draft picks ===
- The following players were selected in the 1992 Major League Baseball draft.
  - John Burke was drafted by the Rockies in the first round.
  - Mark Thompson was drafted by the Rockies in the second round.
  - Roger Bailey was drafted by the Rockies in the third round.
  - Jason Bates was drafted by the Rockies in the seventh round.
  - Garvin Alston was drafted by the Rockies in the tenth round.
  - Craig Counsell was drafted by the Rockies in the eleventh round.
  - Juan Acevedo was drafted by the Rockies in the fourteenth round.
  - Angel Echevarria was drafted by the Rockies in the seventeenth round.
  - Quinton McCracken was drafted by the Rockies in the 25th round.
  - Mark Strittmatter was drafted by the Rockies in the 28th round.

=== Expansion draft ===
As opposed to previous expansion drafts such as the 1961 draft, players from both leagues were available to the expansion clubs. Each existing club could protect fifteen players on their roster from being drafted and only one player could be drafted from each team in the first round. Then for each additional round National League teams could protect an additional 3 players and American League teams could protect 4 more. All unprotected major and minor League players were eligible except those chosen in the amateur drafts of 1991 or 1992 and players who were 18 or younger when signed in 1990.

==== Round 1 ====
Pick	Player	Position	From	Note
1	David Nied	RHP	ATL	
3	Charlie Hayes	3B	NYY	
5	Darren Holmes	RHP	MIL	
7	Jerald Clark	OF	SD	
9	Kevin Reimer	OF	TEX	Was dealt the same day to MIL for Dante Bichette
11	Eric Young	2B	LAD	
13	Jody Reed	2B	BOS	Was dealt the same day to LAD for Rudy Seánez. Seánez played briefly in the Rockies' minor league system before being released in July 1993
15	Scott Aldred	LHP	DET	
17	Alex Cole	OF	PIT	
19	Joe Girardi	C	CHC	
21	Willie Blair	RHP	HOU	
23	Jay Owens	C	MIN	
25	Andy Ashby	RHP	PHI	

==== Round 2 ====
Pick	Player	Position	From	Note
28	Freddie Benavides	SS	CIN	
30	Roberto Mejía	2B	LAD	
32	Doug Bochtler	RHP	MON	Played in the Rockies' minor league system before being traded to SD in the Brad Ausmus deal in July 1993
34	Lance Painter	LHP	SD	
36	Butch Henry	LHP	HOU	
38	Ryan Hawblitzel	RHP	CHC	
40	Vinny Castilla	SS	ATL	
42	Brett Merriman	RHP	CAL	Was traded to MIN before the 1993 season for Gary Wayne
44	Jim Tatum	3B	MIL	
46	Kevin Ritz	RHP	DET	
48	Eric Wedge	C/1B	BOS	
50	Keith Shepherd	RHP	PHI	
52	Calvin Jones	RHP	SEA	Never pitched in the Majors again; never even played in the Rockies' minor leagues

==== Round 3 ====
Pick	Player	Position	From	Note
54	Brad Ausmus	C	NYY	Was traded to SD on July 26 and made MLB debut 2 days later
56	Marcus Moore	RHP	TOR	
58	Armando Reynoso	RHP	ATL	
60	Steve Reed	RHP	SF	
62	Mo Sanford	RHP	CIN	
64	Pedro Castellano	3B	CHC	
66	Curtis Leskanic	RHP	MIN	
68	Scott Fredrickson	RHP	SD	
70	Braulio Castillo	OF	PHI	Played 39 games for AAA Colorado Springs before being traded to HOU for Mark Grant, but never played in the Majors again
72	Denis Boucher	LHP	CLE	Traded before the season to SD for Jay Gainer

=== 1992 MLB June amateur draft and minor league affiliates ===
The Rockies and Florida Marlins, set to debut in 1993, were allowed to participate in all rounds of the June 1992 MLB first-year player draft. The Rockies selected 27th overall in the first round, with pitcher John Burke their top pick. Of the 50 amateur free agents selected, ten made the major leagues, including Burke and—most prominently—Craig Counsell (11th round) and Quinton McCracken (25th). The Rockies affiliated with two minor league clubs during 1992 to develop drafted players.

==== 1992 farm system ====
Level	Team	League	Manager
A-Short Season	Bend Rockies	Northwest League	Gene Glynn
Rookie	AZL Rockies/Cubs	Arizona League	Paul Zuvella

AZL club affiliation shared with Chicago Cubs

== Regular season ==
=== Opening Day starters ===
- Freddie Benavides
- Dante Bichette
- Jerald Clark
- Alex Cole
- Andrés Galarraga
- Joe Girardi
- Charlie Hayes
- David Nied (Bryn Smith was the starter for the home opener)
- Eric Young Sr.

=== Season standings ===
NL West
Team	W	L	Pct.	GB	Home	Road
Atlanta Braves	104	58	.642	—	51‍–‍30	53‍–‍28
San Francisco Giants	103	59	.636	1	50‍–‍31	53‍–‍28
Houston Astros	85	77	.525	19	44‍–‍37	41‍–‍40
Los Angeles Dodgers	81	81	.500	23	41‍–‍40	40‍–‍41
Cincinnati Reds	73	89	.451	31	41‍–‍40	32‍–‍49
Colorado Rockies	67	95	.414	37	39‍–‍42	28‍–‍53
San Diego Padres	61	101	.377	43	34‍–‍47	27‍–‍54

=== Record vs. opponents ===
1993 National League record Source: MLB Standings Grid – 1993
Team	ATL	CHC	CIN	COL	FLA	HOU	LAD	MON	NYM	PHI	PIT	SD	SF	STL
Atlanta	—	7–5	10–3	13–0	7–5	8–5	8–5	7–5	9–3	6–6	7–5	9–4	7–6	6–6
Chicago	5–7	—	7–5	8–4	6–7	4–8	7–5	5–8–1	8–5	7–6	5–8	8–4	6–6	8–5
Cincinnati	3–10	5–7	—	9–4	7–5	6–7	5–8	4–8	6–6	4–8	8–4	9–4	2–11	5–7
Colorado	0–13	4–8	4–9	—	7–5	11–2	7–6	3–9	6–6	3–9	8–4	6–7	3–10	5–7
Florida	5–7	7–6	5–7	5–7	—	3–9	5–7	5–8	4–9	4–9	6–7	7–5	4–8	4–9
Houston	5–8	8–4	7–6	2–11	9–3	—	9–4	5–7	11–1	5–7	7–5	8–5	3–10	6–6
Los Angeles	5–8	5–7	8–5	6–7	7–5	4–9	—	6–6	8–4	2–10	8–4	9–4	7–6	6–6
Montreal	5–7	8–5–1	8–4	9–3	8–5	7–5	6–6	—	9–4	6–7	8–5	10–2	3–9	7–6
New York	3–9	5–8	6–6	6–6	9–4	1–11	4–8	4–9	—	3–10	4–9	5–7	4–8	5–8
Philadelphia	6-6	6–7	8–4	9–3	9–4	7–5	10–2	7–6	10–3	—	7–6	6–6	4–8	8–5
Pittsburgh	5–7	8–5	4–8	4–8	7–6	5–7	4–8	5–8	9–4	6–7	—	9–3	5–7	4–9
San Diego	4–9	4–8	4–9	7–6	5–7	5–8	4–9	2–10	7–5	6–6	3–9	—	3–10	7–5
San Francisco	6–7	6–6	11–2	10–3	8–4	10–3	6–7	9–3	8–4	8–4	7–5	10–3	—	4–8
St. Louis	6–6	5–8	7–5	7–5	9–4	6–6	6–6	6–7	8–5	5–8	9–4	5–7	8–4	—

=== Roster ===
1993 Colorado Rockies
Roster
Pitchers: 32 Scott Aldred; 43 Andy Ashby; 19 Willie Blair; 46 Kent Bottenfield; 49 Scott Fredrickson; 55 Mark Grant; 27 Greg Harris; 27 Butch Henry; 40 Darren Holmes; 47 Bruce Hurst; 41 Mark Knudson; 45 Curtis Leskanic; 54 Marcus Moore; 43 Mike Munoz; 17 David Nied; 28 Lance Painter; 38 Jeff Parrett; 39 Steve Reed; 42 Armando Reynoso; 18 Bruce Ruffin; 34 Mo Sanford; 34 Scott Service; 30 Keith Shepherd; 28 Bryn Smith; 53 Gary Wayne	Catchers: 7 Joe Girardi; 32 Jayhawk Owens; 16 Danny Sheaffer; 22 Eric Wedge; Infielders: 12 Freddie Benavides; 15 Pedro Castellano; 9 Vinny Castilla; 37 Jay Gainer; 14 Andrés Galarraga; 13 Charlie Hayes; 4 Nelson Liriano; 8 Roberto Mejía; 20 Jim Tatum; 21 Eric Young	Outfielders: 10 Dante Bichette; 6 Daryl Boston; 24 Jerald Clark; 5 Alex Cole; 33 Chris Jones; 3 Dale Murphy; 2 Gerald Young	Manager: 25 Don Baylor; Coaches: 36 Larry Bearnarth (pitching); 29 Ron Hassey (first base); 26 Amos Otis (hitting); 1, 3 Jerry Royster (third base); 23 Don Zimmer (bench); 35 Rick Mathews (bullpen); 41 Bill Plummer (bullpen)

=== Transactions ===
- April 3, 1993: Dale Murphy was signed as a free agent by the Colorado Rockies.
- April 29, 1993: Scott Aldred was selected off waivers by the Montreal Expos from the Colorado Rockies.
- May 14, 1993: Mike Munoz was signed as a free agent by the Colorado Rockies.
- May 19, 1993: Gerald Young was released by the Colorado Rockies.
- June 2, 1993: Bryn Smith was released by the Colorado Rockies.
- July 16, 1993: Kent Bottenfield was traded by the Montreal Expos to the Colorado Rockies for Butch Henry.
- July 26, 1993: Brad Ausmus was traded by the Colorado Rockies with Doug Bochtler and a player to be named later to the San Diego Padres for Bruce Hurst and Greg Harris. The Colorado Rockies sent Andy Ashby (July 27, 1993) to the San Diego Padres to complete the trade.

==== Draft picks ====
- The following players were selected in the 1993 Major League Baseball draft.
  - Jamey Wright was drafted by the Rockies in the first round.
  - Bryan Rekar was drafted by the Rockies in the second round.
  - John Thomson was drafted by the Rockies in the seventh round.
  - Edgard Clemente was drafted by the Rockies in the tenth round.
  - Derrick Gibson was drafted by the Rockies in the thirteenth round.
  - Mark Brownson was drafted by the Rockies in the 30th round.
  - Terry Jones was drafted by the Rockies in the 40th round.

=== Major League debuts ===
- Batters:
  - Jay Gainer (May 14)
  - Pedro Castellano (May 30)
  - Jayhawk Owens (Jun 6)
  - Roberto Mejía (Jul 15)
- Pitchers:
  - Scott Fredrickson (Apr 29)
  - Lance Painter (May 19)
  - Curtis Leskanic (Jun 27)
  - Marcus Moore (Jul 9)

== Game log ==
Game Log
April (8–14)

#	Date	Opponent	Score	Win	Loss	Save	Attendance	Record
1	April 5	@ Mets	3–0	Gooden (1–0)	Nied (0–1)		53,127	0–1
2	April 7	@ Mets	6–1	Saberhagen (1–0)	Ruffin (0–1)		27,290	0–2
3	April 9	Expos	11–4	Smith (1–0)	Bottenfield (0–1)		80,227	1–2
4	April 10	Expos	9–5	Nied (1–1)	Martínez (0–2)		65,261	2–2
5	April 11	Expos	19–9	Jones (1–0)	Henry (0–1)		66,987	2–3
6	April 13	Mets	8–4	Saberhagen (2–0)	Holmes (0–1)		52,087	2–4
7	April 14	Mets	6–3	Fernandez (1–0)	Smith (1–1)	Maddux (1)	57,489	2–5
8	April 15	Mets	5–3	Nied (2–1)	Gooden (1–2)		52,608	3–5
9	April 16	@ Expos	3–2	Bottenfield (1–1)	Henry (0–2)	Rojas (4)	17,483	3–6
10	April 17	@ Expos	9–1	Ruffin (1–1)	Martínez (0–3)		23,166	4–6
11	April 18	@ Expos	4–2	Hill (2–0)	Wayne (0–1)		25,034	4–7
12	April 20	@ Cardinals	5–0	Arocha (3–0)	Smith (1–2)	Olivares (1)	30,516	4–8
13	April 21	@ Cardinals	11–2	Nied (3–1)	Magrane (0–2)		25,434	5–8
14	April 22	@ Cardinals	5–2	Perez (2–1)	Wayne (0–2)	Smith (6)	34,218	5–9
15	April 23	Marlins	5–4	Reed (1–0)	Hammond (0–3)	Holmes (1)	57,784	6–9
16	April 24	Marlins	2–1	Aquino (1–1)	Ashby (0–1)	Harvey (5)	58,263	6–10
17	April 25	Marlins	11–1	Bowen (2–1)	Smith (1–3)		71,192	6–11
18	April 26	Cubs	6–3	Harkey (3–0)	Nied (3–2)	Myers (6)	48,768	6–12
19	April 27	Cubs	11–2	Henry (1–2)	Morgan (1–4)		48,328	7–12
20	April 28	Cardinals	7–6	Murphy (1–1)	Holmes (0–2)	Smith (9)	49,765	7–13
21	April 29	Cardinals	5–2	Tewksbury (1–3)	Ashby (0–2)	Smith (10)	57,472	7–14
22	April 30	@ Marlins	6–2	Reynoso (1–0)	Bowen (2–2)		42,535	8–14

May (7–22)

#	Date	Opponent	Score	Win	Loss	Save	Attendance	Record
23	May 1	@ Marlins	7–6	Harvey (1–1)	Reed (1–1)		43,583	8–15
24	May 2	@ Marlins	2–1	Henry (2–2)	Armstrong (2–3)	Holmes (2)	41,370	9–15
25	May 4	@ Cubs	14–13	Blair (1–0)	McElroy (1–1)		32,199	10–15
26	May 5	@ Cubs	3–2	Hibbard (2–2)	Reynoso (1–1)	Myers (8)	20,266	10–16
27	May 6	Braves	13–3	Smoltz (3–3)	Nied (3–3)		50,618	10–17
28	May 7	Braves	13–5	Freeman (1–0)	Parrett (0–1)		65,429	10–18
29	May 8	Braves	8–7	Mercker (2–0)	Fredrickson (0–1)	Stanton (11)	64,614	10–19
30	May 9	Braves	12–7	McMichael (1–1)	Reed (1–2)		70,786	10–20
31	May 10	Giants	7–4	Reynoso (2–1)	Wilson (0–3)		50,705	11–20
32	May 11	Giants	5–3	Swift (4–1)	Nied (3–4)	Beck (8)	49,072	11–21
33	May 12	Giants	8–2	Black (3–0)	Henry (2–3)		50,105	11–22
34	May 13	Giants	13–8	Burkett (6–0)	Ruffin (1–2)		58,833	11–23
35	May 14	@ Reds	13–5	Pugh (3–3)	Ashby (0–3)		48,352	11–24
36	May 15	@ Reds	5–3	Hill (3–0)	Reynoso (2–2)	Reardon (6)	49,697	11–25
37	May 16	@ Reds	14–2	Roper (1–0)	Nied (3–5)		35,434	11–26
38	May 17	@ Padres	4–0	Benes (6–3)	Henry (2–4)		15,251	11–27
39	May 18	@ Padres	2–1	Wayne (1–2)	Rodriguez (1–2)	Holmes (3)	15,347	12–27
40	May 19	@ Padres	7–3	Harris (4–5)	Painter (0–1)		12,773	12–28
41	May 20	@ Padres	5–4	Harris (3–0)	Holmes (0–3)		22,098	12–29
42	May 21	@ Dodgers	8–0	Hershiser (5–4)	Nied (3–6)		51,818	12–30
43	May 22	@ Dodgers	4–3	McDowell (2–0)	Henry (2–5)	Gott (6)	50,537	12–31
44	May 23	@ Dodgers	4–0	Martinez (3–3)	Blair (1–1)		48,343	12–32
45	May 25	@ Astros	7–5	Wayne (2–2)	Hernandez (2–1)	Ashby (1)	18,812	13–32
46	May 26	@ Astros	3–2	Smith (2–3)	Jones (1–4)	Parrett (1)	22,267	14–32
47	May 27	@ Astros	8–0	Drabek (5–5)	Nied (3–7)		22,372	14–33
48	May 28	Phillies	15–9	Rivera (3–2)	Henry (2–6)		58,312	14–34
49	May 29	Phillies	6–0	Mulholland (6–4)	Blair (1–2)		56,263	14–35
50	May 30	Phillies	18–1	Greene (7–0)	Painter (0–2)		56,710	14–36
51	May 31	Pirates	6–2	Reynoso (3–2)	Wakefield (3–5)		47,665	15–36

June (11–14)

#	Date	Opponent	Score	Win	Loss	Save	Attendance	Record
52	June 1	Pirates	8–6	Walk (7–3)	Smith (2–4)		45,752	15–37
53	June 2	Pirates	5–3	Petkovsek (1–0)	Parrett (0–2)	Belinda (11)	50,122	15–38
54	June 4	@ Phillies	2–1	Blair (2–2)	Mulholland (6–5)	Wayne (1)	43,333	16–38
55	June 5	@ Phillies	6–2	Greene (8–0)	Reynoso (3–3)		43,837	16–39
56	June 6	@ Phillies	11–7	Schilling (7–1)	Ashby (0–4)		55,714	16–40
57	June 8	@ Pirates	4–1	Ruffin (2–2)	Wagner (1–3)	Shepherd (1)	16,722	17–40
58	June 9	@ Pirates	4–1	Neagle (2–1)	Blair (2–3)	Belinda (13)	30,625	17–41
59	June 11	Astros	5–4	Parrett (1–2)	Hernandez (2–2)	Holmes (4)	57,136	18–41
60	June 12	Astros	14–11	Shepherd (1–0)	Jones (3–5)		60,864	19–41
61	June 13	Astros	9–1	Ruffin (3–2)	Swindell (5–6)		60,349	20–41
62	June 14	Dodgers	9–4	Astacio (5–4)	Blair (2–4)		51,475	20–42
63	June 15	Dodgers	12–4	McDowell (3–0)	Shepherd (1–1)		55,772	20–43
64	June 16	Dodgers	7–6	Reynoso (4–3)	Gross (5–5)	Grant (1)	51,765	21–43
65	June 18	Padres	11–1	Harris (7–7)	Ruffin (3–3)		52,159	21–44
66	June 19	Padres	17–3	Blair (3–4)	Taylor (0–5)		55,603	22–44
67	June 20	Padres	3–1	Reed (2–2)	Mason (0–5)	Holmes (5)	63,661	23–44
68	June 21	Reds	5–4	Reed (3–2)	Reardon (1–1)		51,835	24–44
69	June 22	Reds	16–13	Wickander (1–0)	Grant (0–1)	Dibble (6)	58,597	24–45
70	June 23	Reds	15–5	Parrett (2–2)	Pugh (3–9)		60,282	25–45
71	June 24	@ Giants	17–2	Burkett (11–2)	Blair (3–5)		39,827	25–46
72	June 25	@ Giants	7–2	Hickerson (1–1)	Henry (2–7)		30,722	25–47
73	June 26	@ Giants	5–1	Reynoso (5–3)	Wilson (5–4)		39,327	26–47
74	June 27	@ Giants	5–0	Swift (10–4)	Leskanic (0–1)		45,408	26–48
75	June 29	@ Braves	6–4	Smoltz (7–7)	Ruffin (3–4)	Stanton (21)	48,974	26–49
76	June 30	@ Braves	3–2	Wohlers (2–0)	Shepherd (1–2)		48,791	26–50

July (10–17)

#	Date	Opponent	Score	Win	Loss	Save	Attendance	Record
77	July 1	@ Braves	4–0	Glavine (10–3)	Reynoso (5–4)		45,252	26–51
78	July 2	Cubs	11–8	Bautista (3–2)	Shepherd (1–3)	Myers (25)	62,037	26–52
79	July 3	Cubs	5–4	Reed (4–2)	Myers (1–2)		63,826	27–52
80	July 4	Cubs	3–1	Parrett (3–2)	Morgan (5–9)	Holmes (6)	59,259	28–52
81	July 5	Cubs	10–1	Harkey (6–2)	Blair (3–6)		55,185	28–53
82	July 6	Marlins	8–3	Reynoso (6–4)	Hough (4–9)		47,528	29–53
83	July 7	Marlins	6–5	Reed (5–2)	Harvey (1–2)		50,707	30–53
84	July 8	Marlins	3–2	Leskanic (1–1)	Rapp (0–1)	Holmes (7)	56,807	31–53
85	July 9	@ Cardinals	5–4	Moore (1–0)	Smith (2–2)	Holmes (8)	41,466	32–53
86	July 10	@ Cardinals	9–3	Osborne (8–3)	Henry (2–8)		53,146	32–54
87	July 11	@ Cardinals	4–1	Reynoso (7–4)	Tewksbury (9–7)	Reed (1)	44,105	33–54
88	July 15	@ Cubs	1–0	Morgan (7–9)	Blair (3–7)		38,765	33–55
89	July 16	@ Cubs	8–2	Guzmán (8–7)	Leskanic (1–2)		39,281	33–56
90	July 17	@ Cubs	5–1	Harkey (7–3)	Reynoso (7–5)		39,522	33–57
91	July 18	@ Cubs	12–2	Hibbard (8–6)	Parrett (3–3)		39,022	33–58
92	July 19	@ Marlins	3–1	Bowen (5–9)	Bottenfield (2–6)	Harvey (26)	37,703	33–59
93	July 20	@ Marlins	6–3	Blair (4–7)	Hammond (10–6)	Holmes (9)	31,852	34–59
94	July 21	@ Marlins	6–4	Rapp (1–2)	Leskanic (1–3)	Harvey (27)	32,129	34–60
95	July 22	Cardinals	7–6	Holmes (1–3)	Burns (0–5)		56,013	35–60
96	July 23	Cardinals	13–11	Watson (2–0)	Reed (5–3)	Smith (34)	58,513	35–61
97	July 24	Cardinals	9–8	Bottenfield (3–6)	Osborne (9–4)	Holmes (10)	71,784	36–61
98	July 25	Cardinals	5–4	Olivares (3–2)	Wayne (2–3)	Guetterman (1)	65,211	36–62
99	July 26	Braves	12–7	Maddux (11–8)	Leskanic (1–4)		62,937	36–63
100	July 27	Braves	10–5	Smoltz (9–8)	Reynoso (7–6)		54,550	36–64
101	July 28	Braves	3–2	Wohlers (5–0)	Reed (5–4)	McMichael (1)	60,237	36–65
102	July 30	Giants	10–4	Brummett (2–3)	Harris (10–10)		71,710	36–66
103	July 31	Giants	4–3	Swift (15–5)	Bottenfield (3–7)	Beck (30)	72,208	36–67

August (14–16)

#	Date	Opponent	Score	Win	Loss	Save	Attendance	Record
104	August 1	Giants	6–5	Burkett (16–4)	Reynoso (7–7)	Beck (31)	72,431	36–68
105	August 2	@ Reds	6–2	Pugh (7–10)	Blair (4–8)		29,088	36–69
106	August 3	@ Reds	5–4	Spradlin (1–0)	Leskanic (1–5)		26,982	36–70
107	August 4	@ Reds	9–3	Roper (2–1)	Harris (10–11)		22,939	36–71
108	August 5	@ Reds	11–4	Rijo (10–5)	Bottenfield (3–8)		33,871	36–72
109	August 6	@ Padres	6–3	Benes (13–7)	Reynoso (7–8)	Hoffman (3)		36–73
110	August 6	@ Padres	6–2	Sanders (1–0)	Blair (4–9)		41,085	36–74
111	August 8	@ Padres	5–2	Sanford (1–0)	Brocail (2–8)	Holmes (11)	15,248	37–74
112	August 9	@ Dodgers	3–2	Reed (6–4)	Gott (4–6)	Holmes (12)	31,953	38–74
113	August 10	@ Dodgers	4–2	Bottenfield (4–8)	Astacio (8–7)		34,163	39–74
114	August 11	@ Dodgers	3–2	Reynoso (8–8)	Martínez (8–7)	Reed (2)	38,421	40–74
115	August 12	@ Dodgers	4–1	Blair (5–9)	Hershiser (8–12)		38,549	41–74
116	August 13	@ Astros	5–3	Wayne (3–3)	Jones (3–9)	Holmes (13)	37,972	42–74
117	August 14	@ Astros	9–0	Harnisch (11–8)	Harris (10–12)		41,523	42–75
118	August 15	@ Astros	4–3	Ruffin (4–4)	Hernandez (3–3)	Holmes (14)	21,690	43–75
119	August 17	Phillies	10–7	Rivera (11–6)	Reynoso (8–9)	Williams (33)	63,183	43–76
120	August 18	Phillies	7–6	Thigpen (2–0)	Ruffin (4–5)	Williams (34)	61,056	43–77
121	August 19	Phillies	6–5	Moore (2–0)	Mason (4–9)	Holmes (15)	53,443	44–77
122	August 21	Mets	4–3	Harris (11–12)	Innis (1–3)	Holmes (16)		45–77
123	August 21	Mets	8–6	Reed (7–4)	Jones (1–1)	Holmes (17)	60,613	46–77
124	August 22	Mets	4–3	Munoz (1–1)	Fernandez (2–4)	Reed (3)	70,064	47–77
125	August 23	@ Phillies	3–2	Wayne (4–3)	Mason (4–10)	Holmes (18)	40,481	48–77
126	August 24	@ Phillies	4–2	Jackson (10–9)	Blair (5–10)	Williams (36)	43,419	48–78
127	August 25	@ Phillies	8–5	Schilling (11–6)	Sanford (1–1)		46,448	48–79
128	August 26	@ Mets	7–1	Gooden (12–14)	Harris (11–13)		20,062	48–80
129	August 27	@ Mets	3–2	Fernandez (3–4)	Bottenfield (4–9)	Innis (3)	21,765	48–81
130	August 28	@ Mets	7–5	Reynoso (9–9)	Jones (1–2)	Holmes (19)	25,238	49–81
131	August 29	@ Mets	6–1	Painter (1–2)	Tanana (6–13)		25,774	50–81
132	August 30	Expos	6–1	Fassero (10–3)	Sanford (1–2)	Rojas (10)	47,699	50–82
133	August 31	Expos	14–3	Heredia (3–2)	Harris (11–14)		46,288	50–83

September (17–9)

#	Date	Opponent	Score	Win	Loss	Save	Attendance	Record
134	September 1	Expos	11–3	Martínez (13–8)	Bottenfield (4–10)		46,781	50–84
135	September 3	Pirates	7–6	Holmes (2–3)	Dewey (1–1)		51,512	51–84
136	September 4	Pirates	10–4	Painter (2–2)	Wakefield (4–9)		56,113	52–84
137	September 5	Pirates	4–1	Ruffin (5–5)	Walk (12–13)	Holmes (20)	54,034	53–84
138	September 6	@ Expos	4–3	Scott (5–2)	Reed (7–5)	Wetteland (34)	40,066	53–85
139	September 7	@ Expos	4–3	Martínez (14–8)	Moore (2–1)	Wetteland (35)	18,988	53–86
140	September 8	@ Expos	6–1	Rueter (7–0)	Reynoso (9–10)	Scott (1)	10,764	53–87
141	September 9	@ Pirates	10–7	Wayne (5–3)	Johnston (2–3)		10,016	54–87
142	September 10	@ Pirates	9–8	Moore (3–1)	Minor (7–6)	Holmes (21)	15,335	55–87
143	September 11	@ Pirates	3–2	Bottenfield (5–10)	Wakefield (4–10)	Ruffin (1)	21,649	56–87
144	September 12	@ Pirates	4–3	Menéndez (2–0)	Munoz (1–2)		21,032	56–88
145	September 14	Astros	9–4	Reynoso (10–10)	Drabek (8–16)	Ruffin (2)		57–88
146	September 14	Astros	6–5	Holmes (3–3)	Hernandez (3–5)		42,657	58–88
147	September 15	Astros	6–4	Munoz (2–2)	Williams (4–4)	Holmes (22)	40,813	59–88
148	September 16	Astros	6–3	Ruffin (6–5)	Jones (1–2)	Holmes (23)	41,847	60–88
149	September 17	Dodgers	12–3	Nied (4–7)	Candiotti (8–8)		56,679	61–88
150	September 18	Dodgers	9–0	Astacio (13–8)	Hurst (0–2)		52,293	61–89
151	September 19	Dodgers	8–5	Reynoso (11–10)	Martínez (10–4)	Holmes (24)	61,573	62–89
152	September 20	Padres	11–7	Seminara (3–2)	Harris (11–15)	Hoffman (5)	41,531	62–90
153	September 21	Padres	15–4	Blair (6–10)	Worrell (1–7)		42,727	63–90
154	September 22	Padres	11–4	Nied (5–7)	Benes (15–14)		41,061	64–90
155	September 24	Reds	9–2	Reed (8–5)	Ayala (6–10)		57,330	65–90
156	September 25	Reds	6–0	Rijo (14–8)	Harris (11–16)		61,179	65–91
157	September 26	Reds	12–7	Reynoso (12–10)	Luebbers (2–5)		70,069	66–91
158	September 28	@ Giants	6–4	Hickerson (7–5)	Nied (5–8)	Beck (45)	28,568	66–92
159	September 29	@ Giants	5–3	Reed (9–5)	Torres (3–4)	Holmes (25)	39,377	67–92

October (0–3)

#	Date	Opponent	Score	Win	Loss	Save	Attendance	Record
160	October 1	@ Braves	7–4	Avery (18–6)	Harris (11–17)	McMichael (18)	48,968	67–93
161	October 2	@ Braves	10–1	Maddux (20–10)	Reynoso (12–11)		48,899	67–94
162	October 3	@ Braves	5–3	Glavine (22–6)	Nied (5–9)	McMichael (19)	48,904	67–95

== Player stats ==
= Indicates team leader

= Indicates league leader

=== Batting ===
==== Starters by position ====
Note: Pos = Position; G = Games played; AB = At bats; H = Hits; Avg. = Batting average; HR = Home runs; RBI = Runs batted in

Pos	Player	G	AB	H	Avg.	HR	RBI
C	Joe Girardi	86	310	90	.290	3	31
1B	Andrés Galarraga	120	470	174	.370	22	98
2B	Eric Young	144	490	132	.269	3	42
SS	Vinny Castilla	105	337	86	.255	9	30
3B	Charlie Hayes	157	573	175	.305	25	98
LF	Jerald Clark	140	478	135	.282	13	67
CF	Alex Cole	126	348	89	.256	0	24
RF	Dante Bichette	141	538	167	.310	21	89

==== Other batters ====
Note: G = Games played; AB = At bats; H = Hits; Avg. = Batting average; HR = Home runs; RBI = Runs batted in

Player	G	AB	H	Avg.	HR	RBI
Daryl Boston	124	291	76	.261	14	40
Roberto Mejía	65	229	53	.231	5	20
Danny Sheaffer	82	216	60	.278	4	32
Freddie Benavides	74	213	61	.286	3	26
Chris Jones	86	209	57	.273	6	31
Nelson Liriano	48	151	46	.305	2	15
Jim Tatum	92	98	20	.204	1	12
Jayhawk Owens	33	86	18	.209	3	6
Pedro Castellano	34	71	13	.183	3	7
Dale Murphy	26	42	6	.143	0	7
Jay Gainer	23	41	7	.171	3	6
Gerald Young	19	19	1	.053	0	1
Eric Wedge	9	11	2	.182	0	1

=== Pitching ===
==== Starting pitchers ====
Note: G = Games pitched; IP = Innings pitched; W = Wins; L = Losses; ERA = Earned run average; SO = Strikeouts

Player	G	IP	W	L	ERA	SO
Armando Reynoso	30	189.0	12	11	4.00	117
David Nied	16	87.0	5	9	5.17	46
Butch Henry	20	84.2	2	8	6.59	39
Kent Bottenfield	14	76.2	3	5	6.10	30
Greg Harris	13	73.1	1	8	6.50	40
Bruce Hurst	3	8.2	0	1	5.19	6

==== Other pitchers ====
Note: G = Games pitched; IP = Innings pitched; W = Wins; L = Losses; ERA = Earned run average; SO = Strikeouts

Player	G	IP	W	L	ERA	SO
Willie Blair	46	146.0	6	10	4.75	84
Bruce Ruffin	59	139.2	6	5	3.87	126
Jeff Parrett	40	73.2	3	3	5.38	66
Curtis Leskanic	18	57.0	1	5	5.37	30
Andy Ashby	20	54.0	0	4	8.50	33
Lance Painter	10	39.0	2	2	6.00	16
Mo Sanford	11	35.2	1	2	5.30	36
Bryn Smith	11	29.2	2	4	8.49	9

==== Relief pitchers ====
Note: G = Games pitched; W = Wins; L = Losses; SV = Saves; ERA = Earned run average; SO = Strikeouts

Player	G	W	L	SV	ERA	SO
Darren Holmes	62	3	3	25	4.05	60
Gary Wayne	65	5	3	1	5.05	49
Steve Reed	64	9	5	3	4.48	51
Marcus Moore	27	3	1	0	6.84	13
Scott Fredrickson	25	0	1	0	6.21	20
Mike Munoz	21	2	1	0	4.50	16
Keith Shepherd	14	1	3	1	6.98	7
Mark Grant	14	0	1	1	12.56	8
Scott Aldred	5	0	0	0	10.80	5
Mark Knudson	4	0	0	0	22.24	3
Scott Service	3	0	0	0	9.64	3

== Farm system ==
Level	Team	League	Manager
AAA	Colorado Springs Sky Sox	Pacific Coast League	Brad Mills
A	Central Valley Rockies	California League	Paul Zuvella
A-Short Season	Bend Rockies	Northwest League	Howie Bedell
Rookie	AZL Rockies	Arizona League	P. J. Carey

Records
Preceded by None	Colorado Rockies seasons 1993	Succeeded by 1994
