= Colorado Rockies all-time roster =

List of baseball players

This list is complete and up-to-date as of the 2026 season.

The following is a list of players, both past and current, who appeared at least in one game for the Colorado Rockies franchise.

Players in Bold are members of the National Baseball Hall of Fame.

Players in Italics have had their numbers retired by the team.

== A ==
- Fernando Abad
- Kurt Abbott
- José Acevedo
- Juan Acevedo
- Cristhian Adames
- Blake Adams
- Mason Adams
- Matt Adams
- Jeremy Affeldt
- Benny Agbayani
- Zach Agnos
- Scott Aldred
- Scott Alexander
- Jorge Alfaro
- Eliézer Alfonzo
- Luke Allen
- Yency Almonte
- Sandy Alomar Jr.
- Yonder Alonso
- Garvin Alston
- Adael Amador
- Alexi Amarista
- Alfredo Amézaga
- Brett Anderson
- Chase Anderson
- Matt Anderson
- Nick Anderson
- Tyler Anderson
- Eric Anthony
- Orlando Arcia
- Danny Ardoin
- Nolan Arenado
- Alberto Árias
- Rolando Arrojo
- Miguel Asencio
- Andy Ashby
- Pedro Astacio
- Garrett Atkins
- Manny Aybar
- John Axford

== B ==
- Roger Bailey
- Jeff Baker
- Daniel Bard
- Sean Barker
- Clint Barmes
- Brandon Barnes
- Jeff Barry
- Kimera Bartee
- Jason Bates
- Denny Bautista
- Jordan Beck
- Robbie Beckett
- Jalen Beeks
- Joe Beimel
- Stan Belinda
- Matt Belisle
- Todd Belitz
- Mark Bellhorn
- Ronnie Belliard
- Edwin Bellorín
- Valente Bellozo
- Rigo Beltrán
- Freddie Benavides
- Gary Bennett
- Christian Bergman
- Warming Bernabel
- Wynton Bernard
- Brennan Bernardino
- Adam Bernero
- Doug Bernier
- Rafael Betancourt
- Chad Bettis
- Dante Bichette
- Larry Bigbie
- Bruce Billings
- Jake Bird
- Ty Blach
- Charlie Blackmon
- Willie Blair
- Bradley Blalock
- Henry Blanco
- Mitchell Boggs
- Brian Bohanon
- Daryl Boston
- Kent Bottenfield
- Sean Bouchard
- Ben Bowden
- Cedrick Bowers
- Micah Bowie
- Darren Bragg
- John Brebbia
- Reid Brignac
- Jorge Brito
- Rex Brothers
- Andrew Brown
- Brooks Brown
- McCade Brown
- Mark Brownson
- Justin Bruihl
- Cliff Brumbaugh
- Kris Bryant
- Taylor Buchholz
- John Burke
- Ellis Burks
- Jeromy Burnitz
- Drew Butera
- Brent Butler
- Eddie Butler
- Eric Byrnes

== C ==
- Edwar Cabrera
- Blair Calvo
- John Cangelosi
- José Capellán
- Matt Carasiti
- Stephen Cardullo
- Shane Carle
- Bubba Carpenter
- Giovanni Carrara
- Cole Carrigg
- Jamey Carroll
- Marcos Carvajal
- Blas Castaño
- Ryan Castellani
- Eiberson Castellano
- Pedro Castellano
- Vinny Castilla
- Frank Castillo
- Daniel Castro
- Harold Castro
- Miguel Castro
- Simón Castro
- Willi Castro
- Jake Cave
- Jhoulys Chacín
- Shawn Chacón
- Tyler Chatwood
- Angel Chivilli
- Bobby Chouinard
- Tim Christman
- Jeff Cirillo
- Jerald Clark
- Darren Clarke
- Royce Clayton
- Edgard Clemente
- J. D. Closser
- Alan Cockrell
- Greg Colbrunn
- Alex Cole
- Darnell Coles
- Alvin Colina
- Alex Colomé
- Tyler Colvin
- José Contreras
- Roansy Contreras
- Aaron Cook
- Mark Corey
- Manuel Corpas
- David Cortés
- Craig Counsell
- Blaine Crim
- Jeff Criswell
- C. J. Cron
- Rich Croushore
- Jacob Cruz
- Nelson Cruz
- Michael Cuddyer
- Noel Cuevas
- Charlie Culberson
- John Curtiss
- Jack Cust
- Jim Czajkowski

== D ==
- David Dahl
- Matt Daley
- Vic Darensbourg
- Dugan Darnell
- Joe Davenport
- Kane Davis
- Noah Davis
- Wade Davis
- Zach Day
- Yonathan Daza
- Jorge De La Rosa
- Valerio De Los Santos
- Steve Decker
- Samuel Deduno
- Mike DeJean
- Manny Delcarmen
- Daniel Descalso
- Ian Desmond
- Elmer Dessens
- Elías Díaz
- Jairo Díaz
- Corey Dickerson
- Phillip Diehl
- Craig Dingman
- Jerry Dipoto
- Scott Dohmann
- Chase Dollander
- Octavio Dotel
- Brenton Doyle
- Tommy Doyle
- Travis Driskill
- Mike Dunn

== E ==
- Adam Eaton
- Angel Echevarria
- Mike Ekstrom
- Scott Elarton
- Brad Eldred
- Mark Ellis
- Alan Embree
- Mario Encarnación
- Edgmer Escalona
- Mike Esposito
- Bobby Estalella
- Shawn Estes
- Carlos Estévez
- Horacio Estrada
- Thairo Estrada

== F ==
- Kyle Farmer
- Mike Farmer
- Sal Fasano
- Jeff Fassero
- Ryan Feltner
- Julián Fernández
- Yanquiel Fernández
- Nate Field
- Tommy Field
- Steve Finley
- Yohan Flande
- Chris Flexen
- Randy Flores
- Josh Fogg
- Dexter Fowler
- Jeff Francis
- Nick Frasso
- Scott Fredrickson
- Kyle Freeland
- Choo Freeman
- Marvin Freeman
- Tyler Freeman
- Christian Friedrich
- Jeff Frye
- Brian Fuentes
- Josh Fuentes
- Braxton Fulford

== G ==
- Jay Gainer
- Andrés Galarraga
- Ron Gant
- Eddy Garabito
- Rico Garcia
- Jon Garland
- Dustin Garneau
- Cole Garner
- Gonzalez Germen
- Jason Giambi
- Derrick Gibson
- Gerónimo Gil
- Lucas Gilbreath
- Joe Girardi
- Chris Gissell
- Mychal Givens
- Ross Gload
- Austin Gomber
- Héctor Gómez
- Rene Gonzales
- Carlos González
- Chi Chi Gonzalez
- Édgar González
- Lariel González
- Luis A. González
- Hunter Goodman
- Curtis Goodwin
- Tom Goodwin
- Tanner Gordon
- Ashton Goudeau
- Joe Grahe
- Mark Grant
- Jon Gray
- Todd Greene
- Randal Grichuk
- Jason Grilli
- Jason Gurka
- Jeremy Guthrie

== H ==
- John Habyan
- Luther Hackman
- David Hale
- Seth Halvorsen
- Darryl Hamilton
- Jason Hammel
- Jeffrey Hammonds
- Garrett Hampson
- Justin Hampson
- Mike Hampton
- Brad Hand
- Ryan Hanigan
- Tim Harikkala
- Mike Harkey
- Greg Harris
- Lenny Harris
- Will Harris
- Geoff Hartlieb
- Joe Harvey
- Ryan Hawblitzel
- LaTroy Hawkins
- Brad Hawpe
- Charlie Hayes
- **Todd Helton**
- Butch Henry
- Matt Herges
- Jimmy Herget
- José Hernández
- Liván Hernández
- Pedro Hernández
- Ramón Hernández
- Jonathan Herrera
- Welinton Herrera
- Bryan Hickerson
- Jaden Hill
- Sam Hilliard
- Jason Hirsh
- Keston Hiura
- Denny Hocking
- Jeff Hoffman
- Greg Holland
- Todd Hollandsworth
- Matt Holliday
- Gavin Hollowell
- Darren Holmes
- Craig House
- Sam Howard
- Trenidad Hubbard
- Dakota Hudson
- Gabriel Hughes
- Nick Hundley
- Brian Hunter
- Bruce Hurst
- Butch Huskey
- Mark Hutton

== I ==
- Chris Iannetta
- José Iglesias

== J ==
- Mike James
- Kevin Jarvis
- Jason Jennings
- Robin Jennings
- José Jiménez
- Ubaldo Jiménez
- Connor Joe
- Alan Johnson
- Charles Johnson
- D. J. Johnson
- Howard Johnson
- Pierce Johnson
- Troy Johnston
- Bobby Jones
- Chris Jones
- Greg Jones
- Nolan Jones
- Terry Jones
- Todd Jones
- Edouard Julien
- Jorge Julio
- Jair Jurrjens
- Evan Justice

== K ==
- Tommy Kahnle
- Connor Kaiser
- Gabe Kapler
- Scott Karl
- Kyle Karros
- Karl Kauffmann
- Mike Kelly
- Matt Kemp
- Kyle Kendrick
- Joe Kennedy
- Logan Kensing
- Bob Keppel
- Brooks Kieschnick
- Darryl Kile
- Byung-hyun Kim
- Sun-Woo Kim
- Ray King
- Mike Kingery
- Tyler Kinley
- Mark Knudson
- Matt Koch
- Joe Koshansky
- Kevin Kouzmanoff
- Marc Kroon
- Chad Kuhl

== L ==
- Aaron Laffey
- Peter Lambert
- Dinelson Lamet
- Mike Lansing
- Justin Lawrence
- Aaron Ledesma
- David Lee
- DJ LeMahieu
- Curt Leskanic
- Matt Lindstrom
- Nelson Liriano
- Mark Little
- Boone Logan
- Aquilino López
- Javier López
- José López
- Rodrigo López
- Wilton López
- Michael Lorenzen
- Sean Lowe
- Jonathan Lucroy
- Jordan Lyles

== M ==
- John Mabry
- Anderson Machado
- Vimael Machín
- Mark Manfredi
- Jeff Manship
- Jeff Manto
- Kirt Manwaring
- Germán Márquez
- Jason Marquis
- Eli Marrero
- Chris Martin
- Tom Martin
- Nick Martini
- Nick Masset
- Kazuo Matsui
- Tyler Matzek
- Brent Mayne
- Matt McBride
- Jake McCarthy
- Zach McClellan
- Mike McCoy
- Quinton McCracken
- Jeff McCurry
- Chuck McElroy
- Jake McGee
- Collin McHugh
- Walt McKeel
- Michael McKenry
- Ryan McMahon
- Brian McRae
- Nick Mears
- Juan Mejía
- Roberto Mejía
- Adam Melhuse
- Tim Melville
- Carlos Mendoza
- Kent Mercker
- José Mesa
- Dan Miceli
- Aaron Miles
- Jim Miller
- Justin Miller
- Matt Miller
- Owen Miller
- Kevin Millwood
- Nate Minchey
- Dustan Mohr
- Anthony Molina
- Mickey Moniak
- Elehuris Montero
- Coco Montes
- Marcus Moore
- Melvin Mora
- David Moraga
- Franklin Morales
- José Morales
- Juan Morillo
- Justin Morneau
- Clayton Mortensen
- Guillermo Moscoso
- Jason Motte
- Taylor Motter
- Mike Moustakas
- Jamie Moyer
- José Mujica
- Mike Munoz
- Dale Murphy
- Daniel Murphy
- Tom Murphy
- Matt Murton
- Harrison Musgrave
- Parker Mushinski
- Mike Myers

== N ==
- Denny Neagle
- Blaine Neal
- Chris Nelson
- Pat Neshek
- Josh Newman
- Juan Nicasio
- Chris Nichting
- David Nied
- Wil Nieves
- Jayson Nix
- Matt Nokes
- Austin Nola
- Connor Norby
- Greg Norton
- Dom Núñez
- Vladimir Núñez

== O ==
- Scott Oberg
- Alex Ochoa
- Seung-hwan Oh
- Miguel Ojeda
- Omar Olivares
- Darren Oliver
- Miguel Olivo
- Tim Olson
- Rafael Ortega
- José Ortiz
- Ramón Ortiz
- Roy Oswalt
- Adam Ottavino
- Josh Outman
- Jayhawk Owens
- Chris Owings
- Pablo Ozuna

== P ==
- Jordan Pacheco
- Matt Pagnozzi
- Lance Painter
- Carson Palmquist
- Kyle Parker
- Gerardo Parra
- Jeff Parrett
- Wes Parsons
- Jordan Patterson
- Felipe Paulino
- Ben Paulsen
- Jay Payton
- James Pazos
- Kit Pellow
- Elvis Peña
- Joel Peralta
- Luis Peralta
- Sammy Peralta
- Neifi Pérez
- Chris Petersen
- Ben Petrick
- J. R. Phillips
- Paul Phillips
- Jorge Piedra
- Juan Pierre
- Kevin Pillar
- Riley Pint
- Scott Podsednik
- Drew Pomeranz
- Mike Porzio
- Brooks Pounders
- Jay Powell
- Jason Pridie
- Jurickson Profar
- Harvey Pulliam
- Zach Putnam

== Q ==
- Chad Qualls
- Cal Quantrill
- José Quintana
- Omar Quintanilla

== R ==
- Brian Raabe
- Ryan Raburn
- Ramón Ramírez
- Roberto Ramírez
- A. J. Ramos
- Fred Rath Jr.
- Mark Redman
- Jeff Reed
- Steve Reed
- Steven Register
- Bryan Rekar
- Desi Relaford
- Michael Restovich
- Dennys Reyes
- José Reyes
- René Reyes
- Greg Reynolds
- Mark Reynolds
- Matt Reynolds
- Armando Reynoso
- Chris Richard
- Juan Rincón
- Ryan Ritter
- Kevin Ritz
- Joe Roa
- Ken Roberts
- Brendan Rodgers
- Josh Roenicke
- Esmil Rogers
- Josh Rogers
- Ryan Rolison
- Jason Romano
- Jordan Romano
- J. C. Romero
- Mandy Romero
- Drew Romo
- Jorge Rondón
- Wilin Rosario
- Zac Rosscup
- Brian Rose
- Bruce Ruffin
- Rio Ruiz
- T. J. Rumfield
- Glendon Rusch
- Chris Rusin
- Josh Rutledge

== S ==
- Bret Saberhagen
- A. J. Sager
- Mike Saipe
- Jeff Salazar
- Jesús Sánchez
- Jonathan Sánchez
- Mo Sanford
- Antonio Santos
- Víctor Santos
- Rob Scahill
- Aaron Schunk
- Tim Scott
- Marco Scutaro
- Connor Seabold
- Bobby Seay
- Kevin Sefcik
- Antonio Senzatela
- Dan Serafini
- Scott Servais
- Brian Serven
- Scott Service
- Chris Sexton
- Bryan Shaw
- Danny Sheaffer
- Ryan Shealy
- Jordan Sheffield
- Keith Shepherd
- TJ Shook
- Chasen Shreve
- Terry Shumpert
- Allan Simpson
- Bryn Smith
- Chad Smith
- Greg Smith
- Jason Smith
- Seth Smith
- Juan Sosa
- Justin Speier
- Ryan Speier
- Ryan Spilborghs
- Jacob Stallings
- Dennis Stark
- Robert Stephenson
- Chad Stevens
- Ian Stewart
- Jim Stoops
- Trevor Story
- Huston Street
- Mark Strittmatter
- Drew Stubbs
- Eric Stults
- Chris Stynes
- Tomoyuki Sugano
- Brett Sullivan
- Cory Sullivan
- Sean Sullivan
- Brent Suter
- Mac Suzuki
- Mark Sweeney
- Bill Swift

== T ==
- Raimel Tapia
- Jim Tatum
- Mike Tauchman
- Julián Tavárez
- Willy Taveras
- Keegan Thompson
- Mark Thompson
- Milt Thompson
- Sterlin Thompson
- John Thomson
- Jesús Tinoco
- Michael Toglia
- Yorvit Torrealba
- Carlos Torres
- Ezequiel Tovar
- Andy Tracy
- Alan Trejo
- Chin-hui Tsao
- Cole Tucker
- Troy Tulowitzki

== U ==
- José Ureña
- Juan Uribe

== V ==
- Pat Valaika
- Ty Van Burkleo
- Cory Vance
- John Vander Wal
- Jerry Vasto
- Greg Vaughn
- Zac Veen
- Mike Venafro
- Dave Veres
- Ryan Vilade
- Ron Villone
- Luis Vizcaíno
- Victor Vodnik
- Chris Volstad

== W ==
- Dave Wainhouse
- **Larry Walker**
- Pete Walker
- Todd Walker
- Bruce Walton
- John Wasdin
- Pat Watkins
- Gary Wayne
- Eric Wedge
- Walt Weiss
- Colton Welker
- Kip Wells
- Turk Wendell
- Ryan Wheeler
- Alex White
- Derrick White
- Gabe White
- Rick White
- Ty Wigginton
- Jackson Williams
- Randy Williams
- Preston Wilson
- Jay Witasick
- Tony Wolters
- Tony Womack
- Jamey Wright
- Austin Wynns

== Y ==
- Rafael Ynoa
- Masato Yoshii
- Eric Young
- Eric Young Jr.
- Gerald Young
- Jason Young

== Z ==
- Gregg Zaun
- Todd Zeile
