= 1992 Major League Baseball expansion draft =

Selection of players by the Marlins and Rockies

- The logo for the 1992 MLB expansion draft

General information
- Sport: Baseball
- Date: November 17, 1992
- Location: New York City
- Network: ESPN

Overview
- 72 total selections
- League: Major League Baseball (Note: While the National League and American League are commonly referred to collectively as Major League Baseball, across many decades, Major League Baseball has only existed as a legal entity since 2000.)
- Expansion teams: Colorado Rockies; Florida Marlins
- Expansion season: 1993
- First selection: David Nied (Colorado Rockies)

The 1992 Major League Baseball expansion draft was held on November 17, 1992, in New York City. The expansion draft allowed two expansion teams in Major League Baseball (MLB)—the Colorado Rockies and Florida Marlins (Note: The Florida Marlins were renamed as the Miami Marlins prior to the 2012 season.)—to build their rosters prior to their inaugural seasons.

The 1990 collective bargaining agreement between MLB owners and the MLB Players Association allowed the National League (NL) to expand by two members—from 12 to 14—to match the size of the American League (AL). In June 1991, MLB accepted bids of groups from Miami, Florida, and Denver, Colorado, with debuts set for the 1993 season. The Rockies were placed in the NL West division and the Marlins were placed in the NL East division.

This was the first major-league expansion draft that allowed expansion teams to select players from either league. The Marlins and Rockies used the draft to build their teams using different strategies. As the Rockies had a smaller operating budget than the Marlins, the Rockies targeted prospects with low salaries, while the Marlins selected older players intended to provide more immediate impact. All three rounds of the draft were televised by ESPN.

== Background ==
1993 MLB expansion teams

Major League Baseball (MLB) team owners and the MLB Players Association agreed to expand the National League (NL) by two teams in the 1990 collective bargaining agreement. Prior to expansion, the NL had 12 teams while the American League had 14.

In June 1991, MLB accepted two bids for expansion franchises: one for Miami, Florida, and the other for Denver, Colorado. Both teams were set to debut in 1993. Expansion was approved unanimously by all teams in July 1991. The Denver group chose to call their franchise the Colorado Rockies, the same name used as the National Hockey League franchise that played in Denver from 1976 to 1982. The Miami group chose to call themselves the Florida Marlins to broaden their fanbase to the entire state, while reviving the nickname of the Miami Marlins, a defunct Minor League Baseball team. An expansion draft to stock both franchises was set for November 1992.

== Procedure ==
In contrast to previous expansion drafts, players from both the American League (AL) and National League (NL) were available to the expansion clubs. Each existing club could protect 15 players on their 40-man roster from being drafted and only one player could be drafted from each team in each round. At the end of each round, NL teams could protect an additional three players and AL teams could protect an additional four. To further protect the AL teams, a maximum of eight AL teams could have three players chosen.

All unprotected MLB and minor league players were eligible except those chosen in the amateur drafts of 1991 or 1992 and players who were 18 or younger when signed in 1990. Players who were free agents after the 1992 season were not eligible for selection in the draft. The Rockies and Marlins, however, were not restricted in offering contracts to free agents. The Rockies signed their first free agent, Andrés Galarraga, to a one-year contract the day before the expansion draft.

The draft order was determined by a coin toss, the winner of which could choose either: (a) the first overall pick in the expansion draft and the 28th, and last, pick in the first round of the 1993 MLB amateur draft; or (b) allow the other team to pick first and receive both the second and third overall expansion draft picks, the right to pick first in the subsequent rounds of the expansion draft, and the 27th, and next-to-last, overall pick in the 1993 MLB amateur draft. Colorado won the toss and chose to pick first overall. The three rounds of the draft were televised by ESPN.

== Results ==
With the first pick, the Rockies chose David Nied, who had a 3–0 win–loss record with a 1.17 earned run average in six MLB appearances with the Atlanta Braves. The Marlins' first selection, Nigel Wilson, spent the 1992 season with the Double-A Knoxville Smokies of the Toronto Blue Jays organization, and had no MLB experience.

In total, the Rockies and Marlins chose 41 pitchers with their combined 72 selections. Of the 72 players chosen, 11 were All-Stars during their careers. Jack Armstrong, Bryan Harvey, and Danny Jackson had been All-Stars before the expansion draft, while Andy Ashby, Brad Ausmus, Vinny Castilla, Jeff Conine, Carl Everett, Joe Girardi, Harvey, Trevor Hoffman, Jackson, and Eric Young became All-Stars later on in their careers. Hoffman would also be elected to the Hall of Fame in 2018.

Key
‡	All-Star
†	Member of the Baseball Hall of Fame

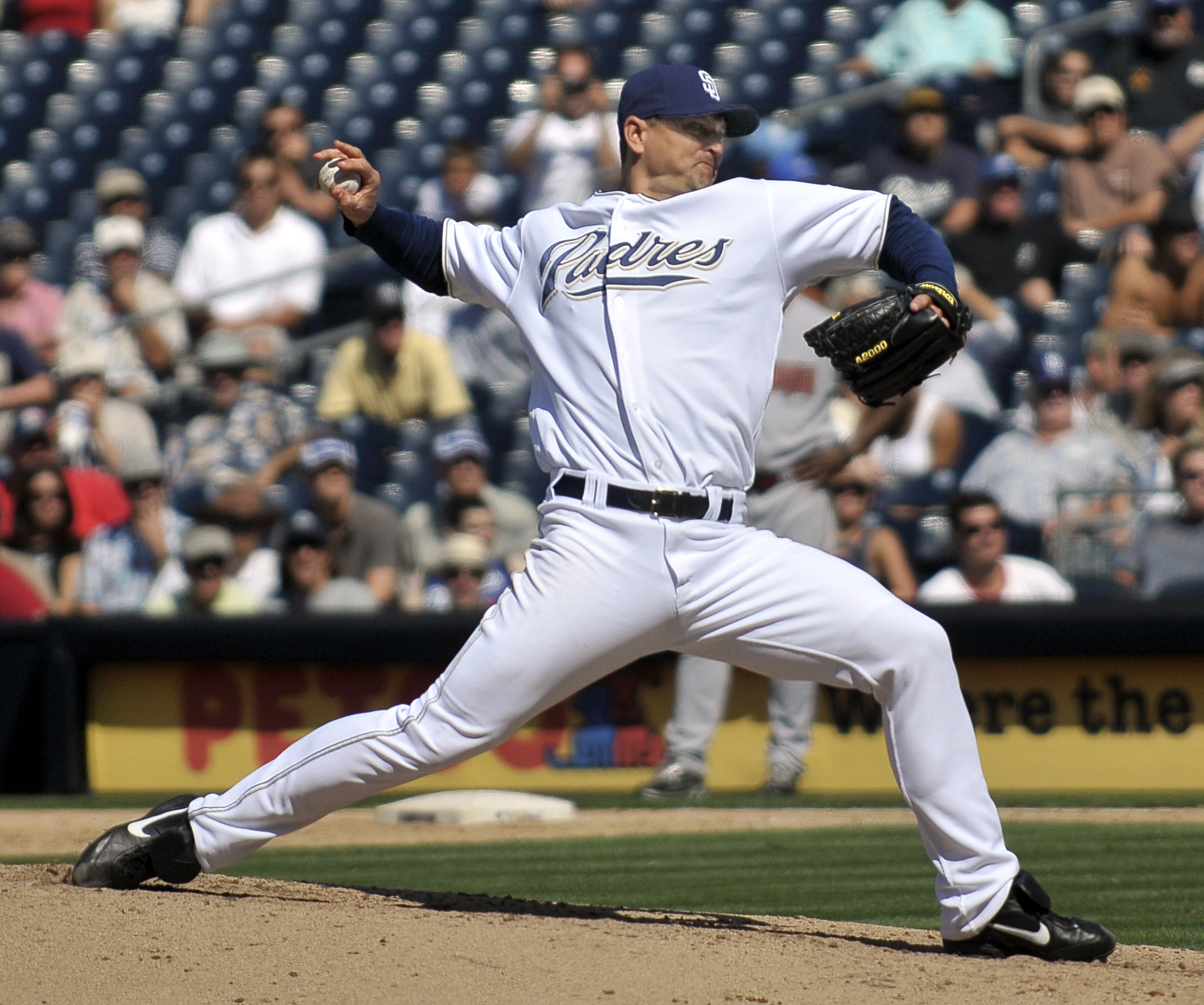
Trevor Hoffman, the one-time career leader in saves, was selected with the 7th pick overall.

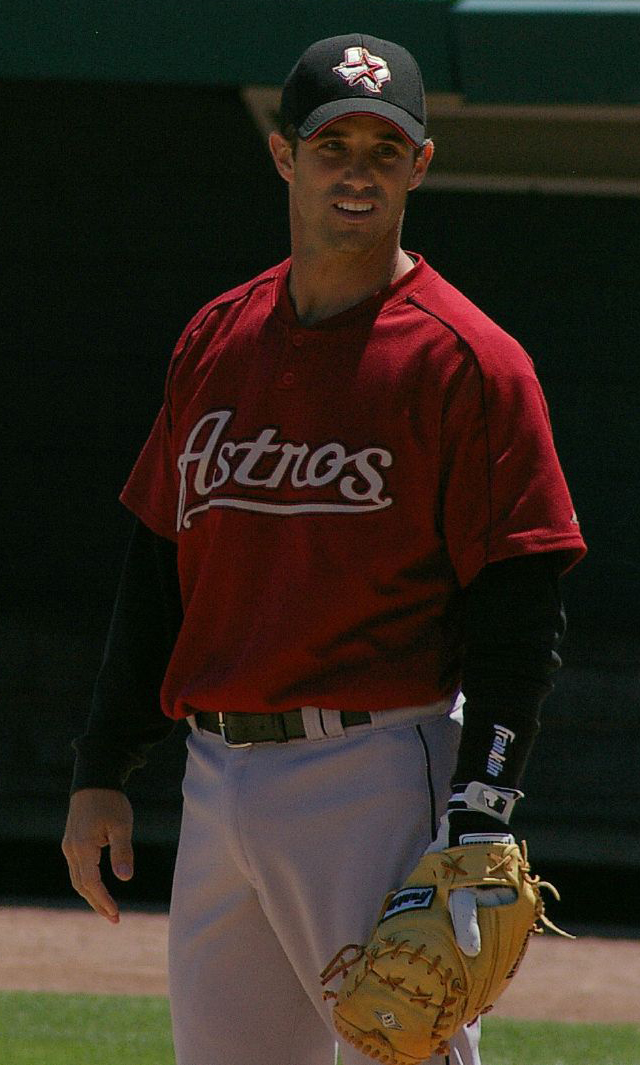
Brad Ausmus never played for the Rockies, but had an 18-year MLB career.

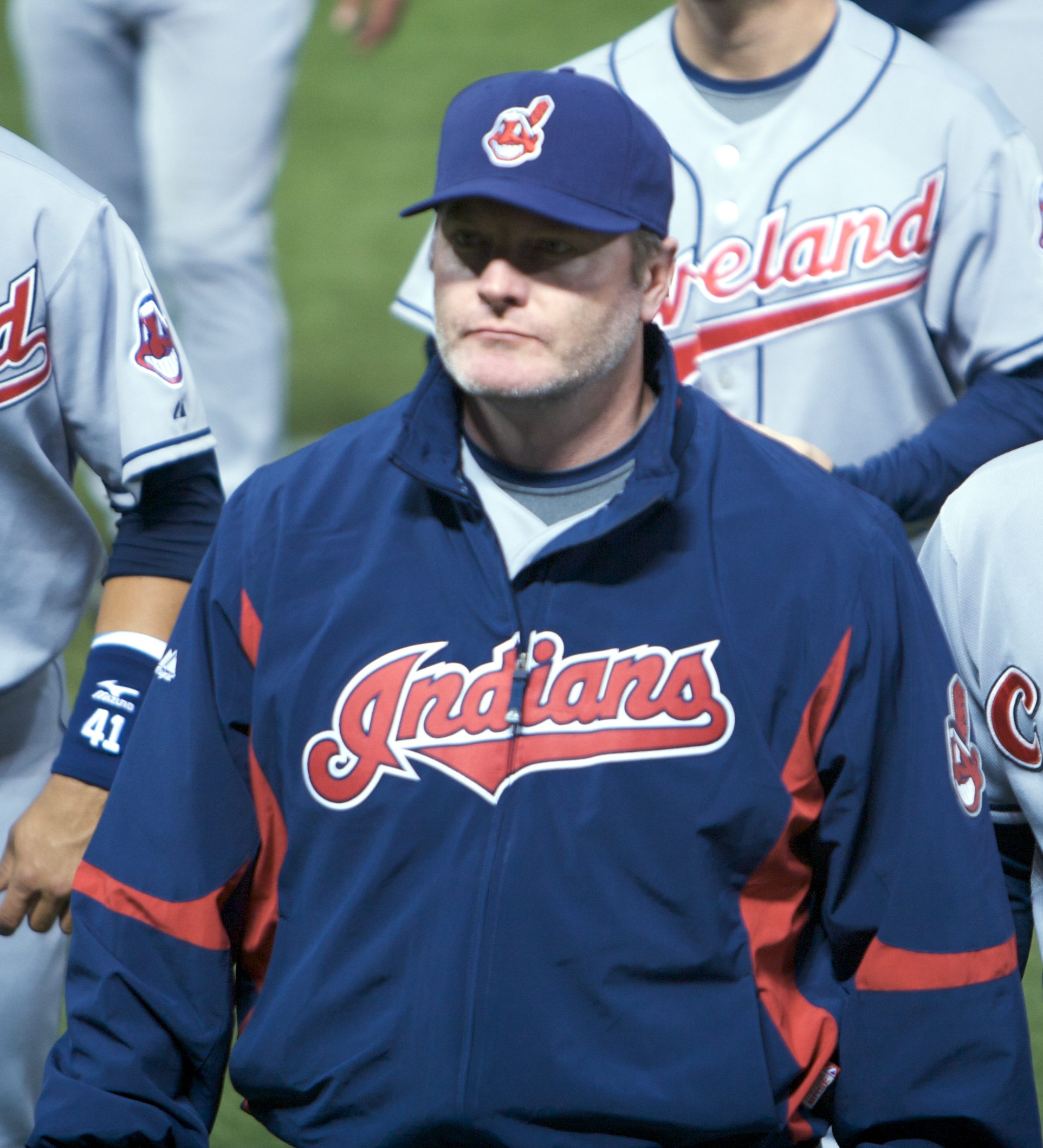
Eric Wedge managed the Cleveland Indians and Seattle Mariners after his playing career.

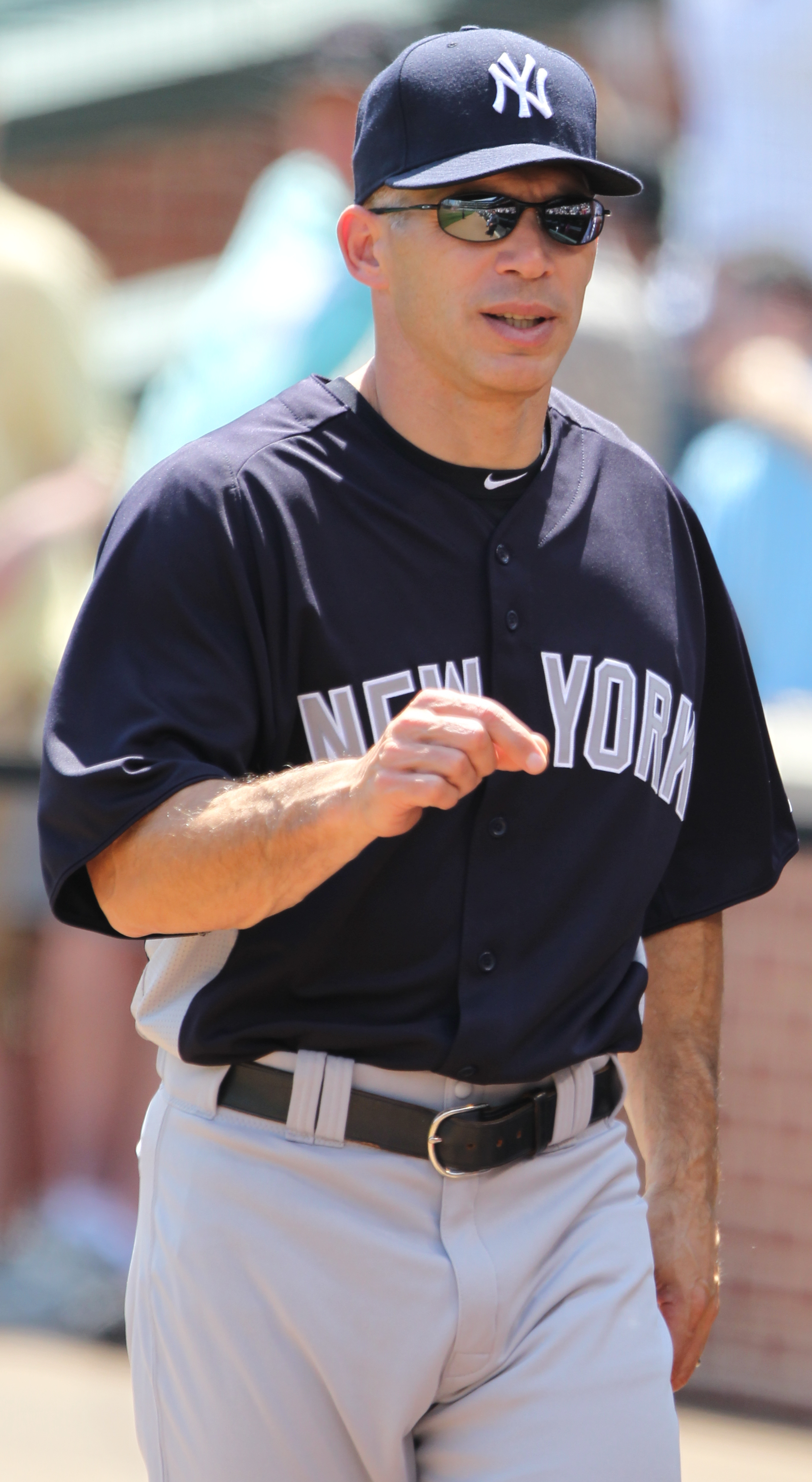
Joe Girardi played for the Rockies (1993–1995) and managed the Marlins (2006).

Round	Pick	Player	Position	Selected from	Selected by
1	1	David Nied	Right-handed pitcher	Atlanta Braves	Colorado Rockies
1	2	Nigel Wilson	Outfielder	Toronto Blue Jays	Florida Marlins
1	3	Charlie Hayes	Third baseman	New York Yankees	Colorado Rockies
1	4	José Martínez	Right-handed pitcher	New York Mets	Florida Marlins
1	5	Darren Holmes	Right-handed pitcher	Milwaukee Brewers	Colorado Rockies
1	6	Bret Barberie	Shortstop	Montreal Expos	Florida Marlins
1	7	Jerald Clark	Outfielder	San Diego Padres	Colorado Rockies
1	8	Trevor Hoffman^{†}	Right-handed pitcher	Cincinnati Reds	Florida Marlins
1	9	Kevin Reimer	Outfielder	Texas Rangers	Colorado Rockies
1	10	Pat Rapp	Right-handed pitcher	San Francisco Giants	Florida Marlins
1	11	Eric Young Sr.^{‡}	Second baseman	Los Angeles Dodgers	Colorado Rockies
1	12	Greg Hibbard	Left-handed pitcher	Chicago White Sox	Florida Marlins
1	13	Jody Reed	Second baseman	Boston Red Sox	Colorado Rockies
1	14	Chuck Carr	Outfielder	St. Louis Cardinals	Florida Marlins
1	15	Scott Aldred	Left-handed pitcher	Detroit Tigers	Colorado Rockies
1	16	Darrell Whitmore	Outfielder	Cleveland Indians	Florida Marlins
1	17	Alex Cole	Outfielder	Pittsburgh Pirates	Colorado Rockies
1	18	Eric Helfand	Catcher	Oakland Athletics	Florida Marlins
1	19	Joe Girardi^{‡}	Catcher	Chicago Cubs	Colorado Rockies
1	20	Bryan Harvey^{‡}	Right-handed pitcher	California Angels	Florida Marlins
1	21	Willie Blair	Right-handed pitcher	Houston Astros	Colorado Rockies
1	22	Jeff Conine^{‡}	First baseman/Outfielder	Kansas City Royals	Florida Marlins
1	23	Jay Owens	Catcher	Minnesota Twins	Colorado Rockies
1	24	Kip Yaughn	Right-handed pitcher	Baltimore Orioles	Florida Marlins
1	25	Andy Ashby^{‡}	Right-handed pitcher	Philadelphia Phillies	Colorado Rockies
1	26	Jesús Tavárez	Outfielder	Seattle Mariners	Florida Marlins
2	27	Freddie Benavides	Shortstop	Cincinnati Reds	Colorado Rockies
2	28	Carl Everett^{‡}	Outfielder	New York Yankees	Florida Marlins
2	29	Roberto Mejia	Second baseman	Los Angeles Dodgers	Colorado Rockies
2	30	David Weathers	Right-handed pitcher	Toronto Blue Jays	Florida Marlins
2	31	Doug Bochtler	Right-handed pitcher	Montreal Expos	Colorado Rockies
2	32	John Johnstone	Right-handed pitcher	New York Mets	Florida Marlins
2	33	Lance Painter	Left-handed pitcher	San Diego Padres	Colorado Rockies
2	34	Ramón Martínez	Shortstop	Pittsburgh Pirates	Florida Marlins
2	35	Butch Henry	Left-handed pitcher	Houston Astros	Colorado Rockies
2	36	Steve Decker	Catcher	San Francisco Giants	Florida Marlins
2	37	Ryan Hawblitzel	Right-handed pitcher	Chicago Cubs	Colorado Rockies
2	38	Cris Carpenter	Right-handed pitcher	St. Louis Cardinals	Florida Marlins
2	39	Vinny Castilla^{‡}	Shortstop	Atlanta Braves	Colorado Rockies
2	40	Jack Armstrong^{‡}	Right-handed pitcher	Cleveland Indians	Florida Marlins
2	41	Brett Merriman	Right-handed pitcher	California Angels	Colorado Rockies
2	42	Scott Chiamparino	Right-handed pitcher	Texas Rangers	Florida Marlins
2	43	Jim Tatum	Third baseman	Milwaukee Brewers	Colorado Rockies
2	44	Tom Edens	Right-handed pitcher	Minnesota Twins	Florida Marlins
2	45	Kevin Ritz	Right-handed pitcher	Detroit Tigers	Colorado Rockies
2	46	Andrés Berumen	Right-handed pitcher	Kansas City Royals	Florida Marlins
2	47	Eric Wedge	Catcher	Boston Red Sox	Colorado Rockies
2	48	Robert Person	Right-handed pitcher	Chicago White Sox	Florida Marlins
2	49	Keith Shepherd	Right-handed pitcher	Philadelphia Phillies	Colorado Rockies
2	50	Jim Corsi	Right-handed pitcher	Oakland Athletics	Florida Marlins
2	51	Calvin Jones	Right-handed pitcher	Seattle Mariners	Colorado Rockies
2	52	Richie Lewis	Right-handed pitcher	Baltimore Orioles	Florida Marlins
3	53	Brad Ausmus^{‡}	Catcher	New York Yankees	Colorado Rockies
3	54	Danny Jackson^{‡}	Left-handed pitcher	Pittsburgh Pirates	Florida Marlins
3	55	Marcus Moore	Right-handed pitcher	Toronto Blue Jays	Colorado Rockies
3	56	Jamie McAndrew	Right-handed pitcher	Los Angeles Dodgers	Florida Marlins
3	57	Armando Reynoso	Right-handed pitcher	Atlanta Braves	Colorado Rockies
3	58	Bob Natal	Catcher	Montreal Expos	Florida Marlins
3	59	Steve Reed	Right-handed pitcher	San Francisco Giants	Colorado Rockies
3	60	Junior Félix	Outfielder	California Angels	Florida Marlins
3	61	Mo Sanford	Right-handed pitcher	Cincinnati Reds	Colorado Rockies
3	62	Kerwin Moore	Outfielder	Kansas City Royals	Florida Marlins
3	63	Pedro Castellano	Third baseman	Chicago Cubs	Colorado Rockies
3	64	Ryan Bowen	Right-handed pitcher	Houston Astros	Florida Marlins
3	65	Curtis Leskanic	Right-handed pitcher	Minnesota Twins	Colorado Rockies
3	66	Scott Baker	Left-handed pitcher	St. Louis Cardinals	Florida Marlins
3	67	Scott Fredrickson	Right-handed pitcher	San Diego Padres	Colorado Rockies
3	68	Chris Donnels	Third baseman	New York Mets	Florida Marlins
3	69	Braulio Castillo	Outfielder	Philadelphia Phillies	Colorado Rockies
3	70	Monty Fariss	Outfielder	Texas Rangers	Florida Marlins
3	71	Denis Boucher	Left-handed pitcher	Cleveland Indians	Colorado Rockies
3	72	Jeff Tabaka	Left-handed pitcher	Milwaukee Brewers	Florida Marlins

== Draft-day trades ==
The following trades were announced at the conclusion of the expansion draft:

- The Marlins traded Danny Jackson to the Philadelphia Phillies for Joel Adamson and Matt Whisenant.
- The Marlins traded Greg Hibbard to the Chicago Cubs for Gary Scott and Alex Arias.
- The Marlins traded Eric Helfand and Scott Baker to the Oakland Athletics for Walt Weiss.
- The Marlins traded Tom Edens to the Houston Astros for Héctor Carrasco and Brian Griffiths.
- The Rockies traded Kevin Reimer to the Milwaukee Brewers for Dante Bichette.
- The Rockies traded Jody Reed to the Los Angeles Dodgers for Rudy Seánez.
- The Cincinnati Reds traded Norm Charlton to the Seattle Mariners for Kevin Mitchell.

== Aftermath ==
Several older star players who were left unprotected, including Danny Tartabull, Jack Morris, and Shawon Dunston, were not selected due to their high salaries and advanced age. Based on the results of the expansion draft, the Marlins were projected to have a higher payroll in 1993 than the Rockies. The Rockies' payroll appeared to be $4 million, less than what the Marlins would pay Bryan Harvey.

The New York Yankees challenged the validity of the draft on the basis that the Marlins did not compensate the Yankees for the loss of territory in Fort Lauderdale, Florida, where the Yankees had a minor league team. They attempted to revoke the assignment of Hayes and Ausmus to the Rockies and Everett to the Marlins. Invoking the "best interests of baseball" clause, Commissioner Bud Selig and the major league executive council affirmed the draft results.

In the 1993 Major League Baseball season, the Marlins and Rockies both finished sixth out of seven teams in their respective divisions. The Rockies were the first team to reach the playoffs, using the roster they developed through the expansion draft to win the wild card in 1995, a record for the shortest amount of time for an expansion baseball team to make the playoffs at the time. (The Arizona Diamondbacks would go on to break the record by reaching the playoffs in 1999, their second year of existence.) Ritz and Painter, both selected in the expansion draft, started Games 1 and 2 of the 1995 National League Division Series for the Rockies. The Rockies added free agent acquisition Larry Walker to a lineup of power hitters in Galarraga, Bichette, and Castilla, known collectively as the "Blake Street Bombers".

Meanwhile, the Marlins kept fewer players they selected in the expansion draft than the Rockies. In 1996, the Rockies retained 13 players from the draft, while the Marlins had six. Jeff Conine, nicknamed "Mr. Marlin", was the only player selected in the expansion draft on the Marlins' 1997 World Series championship roster. However, the Marlins used the players selected in the expansion draft to craft their 1997 roster. The Marlins traded three players selected in the draft, Hoffman, Martínez and Berumen, to the San Diego Padres for Gary Sheffield, a key member of the 1997 Florida Marlins. However, other key players to the Marlins' World Series championship were signed as free agents. The 1997 Marlins set records by reaching and winning the World Series in the team's fifth year (these records were broken by the 2001 Arizona Diamondbacks, who won the World Series in their fourth year of existence) and were the first wild card team to win the World Series.

== Sources ==
- "1992 MLB Expansion Draft". Baseball Reference. Archived from the original on September 18, 2012.
