= Nigel Wilson (baseball) =

Canadian baseball player (born 1970)

- Outfielder
- Born: January 12, 1970 (age 56); Ajax, Ontario, Canada
- Batted: Left Threw: Left

Professional debut
- MLB: September 8, 1993, for the Florida Marlins
- NPB: 1997, for the Hokkaido Nippon-Ham Fighters

Last appearance
- MLB: September 29, 1996, for the Cleveland Indians
- NPB: 2002, for the Osaka Kintetsu Buffaloes

MLB statistics
- Batting average: .086
- Home runs: 2
- Runs batted in: 5

NPB statistics
- Batting average: .265
- Home runs: 119
- Runs batted in: 337
- Stats at Baseball Reference

Teams
- Florida Marlins (1993); Cincinnati Reds (1995); Cleveland Indians (1996); Nippon Ham Fighters (1997–2001); Osaka Kintetsu Buffaloes (2002)

Career highlights and awards
- NPB: 2× Best Nine Award (1998, 2000)

Nigel Edward Wilson (born January 12, 1970) is a Canadian former Major League Baseball player from Oshawa, Ontario. He played for the Florida Marlins, Cincinnati Reds, and Cleveland Indians. He also spent six highly successful seasons in Nippon Professional Baseball with the Nippon Ham Fighters and Osaka Kintetsu Buffaloes. He now owns a sports training facility in Ajax, Ontario.

== Career ==
Wilson signed with the Toronto Blue Jays in 1988 as an amateur free agent and was promoted as high as Double-A in the Toronto organization.

Wilson was then drafted by the Florida Marlins in the 1992 MLB Expansion Draft as their first pick (second overall, behind David Nied by the Colorado Rockies).

Wilson played a total of 22 major league games with the Marlins (1993), Cincinnati Reds (1995), and Cleveland Indians (1996), failing to get a hit as either a Marlin or a Red, going 0-for-23 in his time with these teams, with 15 strikeouts and no walks or HBPs.

After an 0-for-2 start with the Indians (with 1 strikeout), Wilson recorded his first major league hit in his 26th at bat. His major league career ended shortly thereafter; Wilson retired with 3 MLB hits in total.

In 1997, he joined the Nippon Ham Fighters of the Japanese Pacific League after being released from the Indians.

On June 21, 1997, he hit home runs in 4 consecutive at bats, becoming only the second player in Japanese baseball history to ever attain this mark after Sadaharu Oh, ending that season with a league-leading 37 home runs.

In 1998, he greatly improved his clutch hitting, leading the league with 33 home runs and 128 RBIs to win the Best Nine Award for designated hitter.

In 1999, he played only 6 games due to a knee injury, but the team decided not to release him at the end of the season. The team's decision proved to be correct, as Wilson rebounded in 2000, hitting 37 home runs with 89 RBIs to win his second Best Nine Award.

Wilson sustained another injury in 2001, and left the team after playing only 34 games that year then was picked up by the Osaka Kintetsu Buffaloes the following year, but could not repeat his earlier success. He left Japan at the end of 2002, and signed a minor league contract with the New York Yankees organization, but did not make it into a major league roster.

Wilson is remembered as one of the best non-Japanese players ever to play for the Nippon Ham Fighters, along with Tony Solaita and Sherman Obando.

== Personal ==
Wilson's father was a cricket player from Trinidad.

Wilson resides in Ajax, Ontario with his wife Natalie Wilson and their three children, Morgan, Paris, and Quinton. He also has an older daughter, LaToya Forever, a YouTube personality and cast member of The Real Housewives of Atlanta.

Wilson has owned and run the Competitive Edge sports training facility in Ajax since 2008. Wilson has coached many successful college players.
