= Brett Merriman =

American baseball player (born 1966)

- Pitcher
- Born: July 15, 1966; Jacksonville, Illinois, U.S.
- Batted: Right Threw: Right

MLB debut
- April 8, 1993, for the Minnesota Twins

Last MLB appearance
- June 22, 1994, for the Minnesota Twins

MLB statistics
- Win–loss record: 1-2
- Earned run average: 8.39
- Strikeouts: 24
- Stats at Baseball Reference

Teams
- Minnesota Twins (1993–1994)

Brett Alan Merriman (born July 15, 1966) is an American former professional baseball pitcher. He played for the Minnesota Twins of Major League Baseball (MLB).

== Career ==
Merriman played college baseball for Grand Canyon University and Mesa Community College. He was drafted by the Cleveland Indians in the ninth round of the 1988 Major League Baseball draft. Merriman was released by the Indians prior to the 1990 season, but was signed by the California Angels. The Angels left Merriman exposed in the 1992 Major League Baseball expansion draft, and he was selected by the Colorado Rockies from the Angels as the 42nd pick in the expansion draft. Prior to the 1993 season, the Rockies traded Merriman to the Minnesota Twins for Gary Wayne and Bob Wassenaar. Merriman made his MLB debut with the Twins in 1993. After the 1994 season, he was granted free agency, and he signed with the San Diego Padres, playing in their minor league system in 1995. After the 1995 season, Merriman retired.
