= Phil Clark (outfielder) =

American baseball player & coach (born 1968)

- Outfielder / Coach
- Born: May 6, 1968 (age 57); Crockett, Texas, U.S.
- Batted: Right Threw: Right

Professional debut
- MLB: May 27, 1992, for the Detroit Tigers
- NPB: 1997, for the Kintetsu Buffaloes

Last appearance
- MLB: April 30, 1996, for the Boston Red Sox
- NPB: 2000, for the Kintetsu Buffaloes

MLB statistics
- Batting average: .276
- Home runs: 17
- Runs batted in: 65

NPB statistics
- Batting average: .305
- Home runs: 93
- Runs batted in: 324
- Stats at Baseball Reference

Teams
- As player: Detroit Tigers (1992); San Diego Padres (1993–1995); Boston Red Sox (1996); Kintetsu Buffaloes (1997–2000); As coach: Detroit Tigers (2018–2020)

Career highlights and awards
- 3× Best Nine Award (1997, 1998, 2000)

Phillip Benjamin Clark (born May 6, 1968) is an American former professional baseball outfielder and coach. He most recently served as the assistant hitting coach for the Detroit Tigers of Major League Baseball (MLB). He played for the Detroit Tigers, San Diego Padres, and Boston Red Sox. He also played four seasons in Japan with the Kintetsu Buffaloes.

== Playing career ==
Clark signed with the Detroit Tigers after being selected with their first-round pick in the 1986 Major League Baseball draft out of high school, and made his major league debut with the Tigers in 1992. He was sent off to the San Diego Padres the following year, and hit .313 with 9 home runs in 102 games. He continued to play part-time before being released by the Boston Red Sox in 1996. He joined the Kintetsu Buffaloes in the Japanese Pacific League in 1997, and hit 23 home runs with a .331 batting average (second in the league after Ichiro Suzuki) in his first year to win the Best Nine Award at first base. He hit 48 doubles in 1998, which was the Japanese single-season record until Yoshitomo Tani broke it in 2001, and ended with a .320 batting average, with 31 home runs and 114 RBIs to win his second consecutive Best Nine Award. His production decreased in 1999, but he still won a third Best Nine Award at designated hitter. In 2000, he missed over half of the season after being hit by a pitch, and was released at the end of the year.

== Coaching career ==
On December 9, 2014, Clark was named the hitting coach for the Class-A West Michigan Whitecaps.

On December 2, 2015, Clark was named the hitting coach for the Double-A Erie SeaWolves.

On November 2, 2017, Clark was named the assistant hitting coach for the Detroit Tigers for the 2018 season.

On December 20, 2020, Clark was hired by the Wei Chuan Dragons of the Chinese Professional Baseball League to be the team's hitting coach for the ensuing season.

== Personal life ==
His brother, Jerald Clark, also played in the major leagues and Nippon Professional Baseball.
