= Jay Gainer =

American baseball player (born 1966)

- First baseman
- Born: October 8, 1966 (age 59); Panama City, Florida, U.S.
- Batted: Left Threw: Left

MLB debut
- May 14, 1993, for the Colorado Rockies

Last MLB appearance
- October 2, 1993, for the Colorado Rockies

MLB statistics
- Batting average: .171
- Home runs: 3
- Runs batted in: 6
- Stats at Baseball Reference

Teams
- Colorado Rockies (1993)

Johnathan Keith Gainer (born October 8, 1966) is an American former Major League Baseball first baseman who appeared in 23 games for the Colorado Rockies in its 1993 season. He is an alumnus of the University of South Alabama.

== Career ==
A member of the inaugural Rockies team, Gainer was previously selected by the San Diego Padres in the 24th round of the 1990 MLB draft. He then was sent by San Diego to Colorado in exchange for pitcher Denis Boucher in March 1993.

Gainer would make his Major League Baseball debut with the Rockies on May 14, 1993 as their starting first baseman and wore #37. At this time, Gainer became one of 22 players in Major League history to homer on the first pitch of their first Major League at bat.

Afterwards, Gainer appeared in his final game on October 2 of that year as a pinch-hitter for Lance Painter.

Besides, Gainer saw action in the Mexican and Italian leagues. Overall, he hit .275 with 121 home runs and 484 RBI in 11 minor league seasons spanning 1990–2001. After retiring, he served as a hitting coach for the Visalia Oaks.
