= Scott Baker (left-handed pitcher) =

American baseball player (born 1970)

- Pitcher
- Born: May 18, 1970 (age 55); San Jose, California, U.S.
- Batted: Left Threw: Left

Professional debut
- MLB: July 17, 1995, for the Oakland Athletics
- KBO: 1998, for the Samsung Lions

Last appearance
- MLB: July 17, 1995, for the Oakland Athletics
- KBO: 1998, for the Samsung Lions

MLB statistics
- Win–loss record: 0–0
- Earned run average: 9.82
- Strikeouts: 3

KBO statistics
- Win–loss record: 15–7
- Earned run average: 4.13
- Strikeouts: 87
- Stats at Baseball Reference

Teams
- Oakland Athletics (1995); Samsung Lions (1998)

Scott Baker (born May 18, 1970) is an American former professional baseball pitcher. He played one game in Major League Baseball (MLB) and one season in the Korea Baseball Organization.

== Career ==
A graduate of Basic High School in Henderson, Nevada, Baker played his only major league game for the Oakland Athletics on July 17, 1995. He played with the Akron Aeros in 1997. In 1998, he played for the KBO's Samsung Lions. He returned to play for the Mexican League's Guerreros de Oaxaca in 2000, then played for various teams in the independent Western Baseball League until 2002.
