= Tim Pugh =

American baseball player (born 1967)

- Pitcher
- Born: January 26, 1967 (age 59); South Lake Tahoe, California, U.S.
- Batted: Right Threw: Right

MLB debut
- September 1, 1992, for the Cincinnati Reds

Last MLB appearance
- May 24, 1997, for the Detroit Tigers

MLB statistics
- Win–loss record: 25–28
- Earned run average: 4.98
- Strikeouts: 214
- Stats at Baseball Reference

Teams
- Cincinnati Reds (1992–1996); Kansas City Royals (1996); Detroit Tigers (1997)

Timothy Dean Pugh (born January 26, 1967) is a former Major League Baseball pitcher who played for the Cincinnati Reds, the Kansas City Royals, and the Detroit Tigers. He debuted on September 1, 1992 against the Montreal Expos and gave up 3 earned runs in 4 innings. He had been drafted by the Reds in the 6th round of the 1989 amateur draft after playing in college at Oklahoma State.

As a prep player, Pugh pitched for the Bartlesville High School team that won the Oklahoma class 5A state championship in baseball in 1985.
