= Kevin Reimer =

American baseball player (born 1964)

- Left fielder / Designated hitter
- Born: June 28, 1964 (age 62); Macon, Georgia, U.S.
- Batted: Left Threw: Right

Professional debut
- MLB: September 13, 1988, for the Texas Rangers
- NPB: April 9, 1994, for the Fukuoka Daiei Hawks

Last appearance
- MLB: September 27, 1993, for the Milwaukee Brewers
- NPB: September 24, 1995, for the Fukuoka Daiei Hawks

MLB statistics
- Batting average: .258
- Home runs: 52
- Runs batted in: 204

NPB statistics
- Batting average: .279
- Home runs: 36
- Runs batted in: 149
- Stats at Baseball Reference

Teams
- Texas Rangers (1988–1992); Milwaukee Brewers (1993); Fukuoka Daiei Hawks (1994–1995)

Kevin Michael Reimer (born June 28, 1964) is an American former professional baseball player who played in the Major Leagues primarily as an outfielder and designated hitter from 1988–1993. He also played two seasons in Japan for the Fukuoka Daiei Hawks in 1994–1995.

== Career ==
Reimer was drafted by the Texas Rangers in the 11th round of the 1985 Major League Baseball draft. In 1988, Reimer was named the Rangers' Minor League Player of the Year and also received the Tip O'Neill Award as Canada's Baseball Player of the Year. In 1991, Reimer hit a career-high 20 home runs for the Rangers. Reimer was drafted by the Colorado Rockies from the Texas Rangers as the 9th pick in the 1992 Major League Baseball expansion draft, and promptly traded to Milwaukee Brewers for Dante Bichette.

In his MLB career, Reimer played in 488 games, had 1455 at bats, scored 162 runs, had 376 hits, 52 home runs, 204 runs batted in, a .258 batting average, .320 on-base percentage, and .430 slugging percentage.

On August 24, 1993, Reimer became just the second Brewer (after Johnny Briggs in 1973) to go 6-for-6 in a single game.

Reimer represented Canada at the 1983 Pan American Games and at the 1984 Summer Olympics. In the latter competition, baseball was a demonstration event. He was born in Macon, Georgia while his father, Gerry Reimer, was playing in the minor leagues for the Macon Peaches. As a result of his American birth and Canadian parents, Reimer is a dual citizen. Gerry played in the minors from 1958 to 1968.

== See also ==
- List of Major League Baseball single-game hits leaders
