= Ryan Bowen (baseball) =

American baseball player (born 1968)

- Pitcher
- Born: February 10, 1968 (age 58); Hanford, California, U.S.
- Batted: Right Threw: Right

MLB debut
- July 22, 1991, for the Houston Astros

Last MLB appearance
- October 1, 1995, for the Florida Marlins

MLB statistics
- Win–loss record: 17–28
- Earned run average: 5.30
- Strikeouts: 216
- Stats at Baseball Reference

Teams
- Houston Astros (1991–1992); Florida Marlins (1993–1995)
Medals
Men's baseball
Representing United States
World Junior Baseball Championship
Bronze medal – third place	1986 Windsor	Team

Ryan Eugene Bowen (born February 10, 1968) is an American former professional baseball pitcher. Bowen pitched all or parts of five seasons in Major League Baseball (MLB) from 1991 to 1995 for the Houston Astros and Florida Marlins.

== Career ==
Bowen was originally drafted by the Astros in the first round of the 1986 Major League Baseball draft. He spent the next four seasons working his way up through their farm system before making his major league debut in 1991, no-hitting the Cardinals for five innings. After pitching parts of two seasons for the Astros, he was chosen in the 3rd round of the 1992 MLB Expansion Draft by the Florida Marlins, with whom he spent the next three seasons.

After two additional seasons in the minor leagues, Bowen played in Taiwan during the 1998 season before attempting a comeback in 1999 with the Sacramento Steelheads of the Western Baseball League. He retired after the 1999 season.
