= 1986 Major League Baseball draft =

Baseball draft of amateur players by Major League Baseball

General information
- Date: June 1986
- Location: Conference call

Overview
- First selection: Jeff King; Pittsburgh Pirates
- First round selections: 28

The 1986 Major League Baseball draft was the 22nd MLB draft that took place in 1986. During this draft 21 future all-stars were drafted: Greg Swindell, Matt Williams, Kevin Brown, Gary Sheffield, Roberto Hernández, Jack Armstrong, Dean Palmer, Scott Cooper, Kent Bottenfield, Bo Jackson, Joe Girardi, Pat Hentgen, Tom Gordon, Steve Finley, Rod Beck, Chuck Knoblauch, Rick Reed, Paul Quantrill, John Olerud, Scott Erickson and Todd Jones.

== First round selections ==
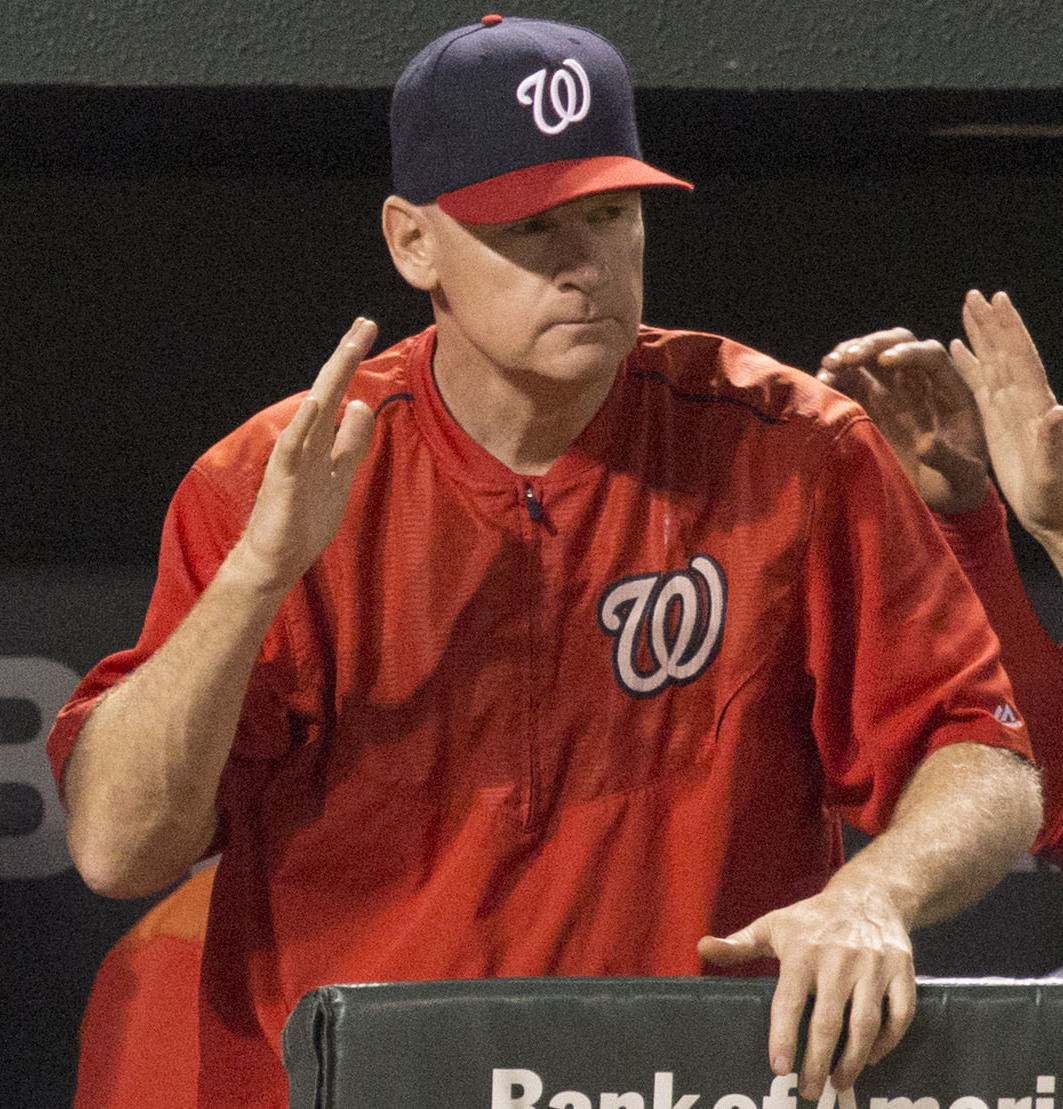
The San Francisco Giants selected Matt Williams third overall. Williams is a 5× All-Star, 4× Gold Glove Award winner at third base, 4× Silver Slugger Award winner at third base, and the 2014 National League Manager of the Year.

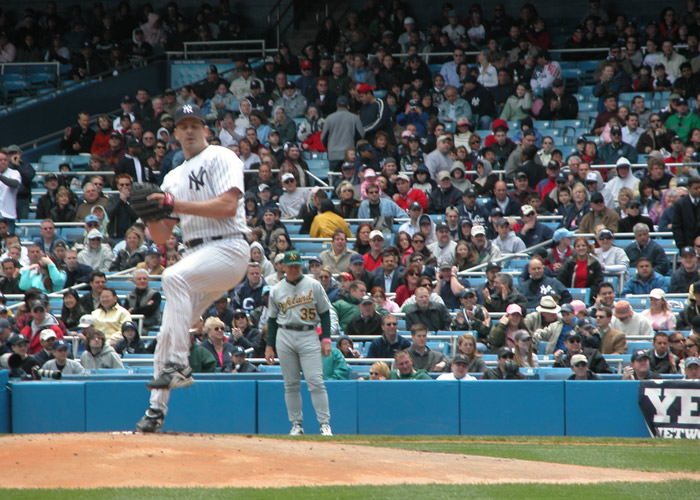
The Texas Rangers selected Kevin Brown fourth overall. Brown is a 6× All-Star, and a two-time National League ERA leader. He helped lead the Florida Marlins to a World Series victory in 1997.

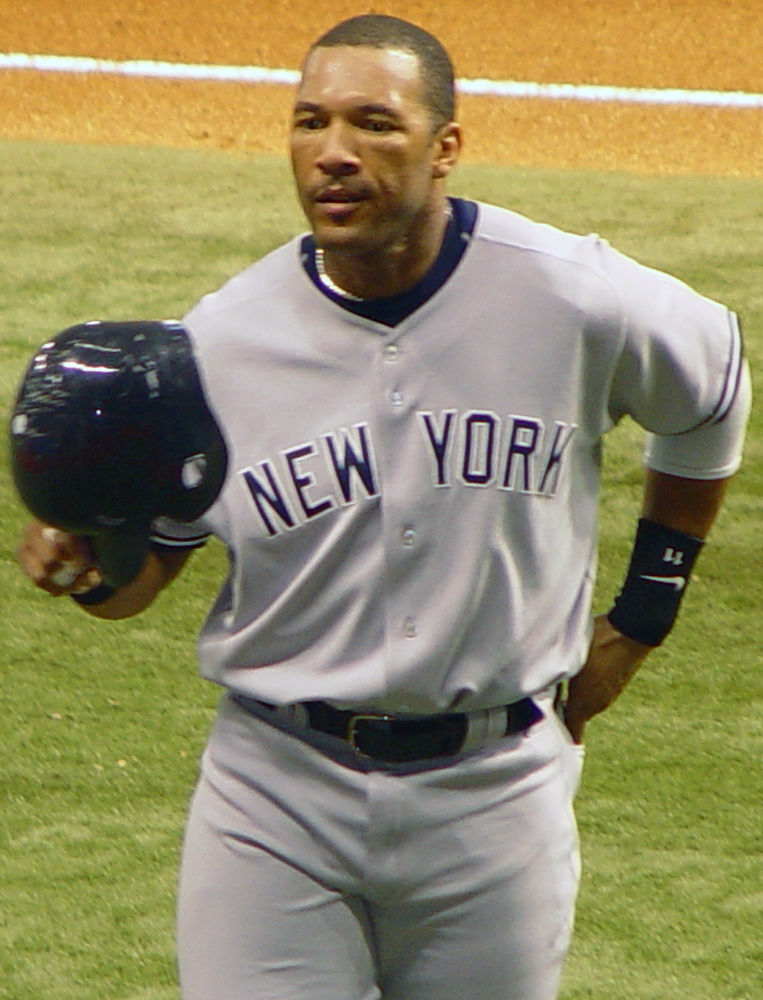
The Milwaukee Brewers selected Gary Sheffield sixth overall. Sheffield is a 9× All-Star, 5× Silver Slugger (four at outfield and one at third base), and a member of the 500 home run club.

The following are the first round picks in the 1986 Major League Baseball draft.

= All-Star	= Baseball Hall of Famer

Pick	Player	Team	Position	Hometown/School
1	Jeff King	Pittsburgh Pirates	SS	Arkansas
2	Greg Swindell	Cleveland Indians	P	Texas
3	Matt Williams	San Francisco Giants	3B	UNLV
4	Kevin Brown	Texas Rangers	P	Georgia Tech
5	Kent Mercker	Atlanta Braves	P	Dublin High School (OH)
6	Gary Sheffield	Milwaukee Brewers	SS	Hillsborough High School (FL)
7	Brad Brink	Philadelphia Phillies	RHP	USC
8	Patrick Lennon	Seattle Mariners	SS	Whiteville High School (NC)
9	Derrick May	Chicago Cubs	OF	Newark High School (DE)
10	Derek Parks	Minnesota Twins	RHP	Montclair High School (CA)
11	Thomas Howard	San Diego Padres	OF	Ball State
12	Scott Hemond	Oakland Athletics	C	South Florida
13	Ryan Bowen	Houston Astros	RHP	Hanford High School (CA)
14	Greg McMurtry	Boston Red Sox	OF	Brockton High School (MA)
15	Kevin Dean	Montreal Expos	OF	Hogan High School (CA)
16	Roberto Hernández	California Angels	RHP	South Carolina
17	Scott Scudder	Cincinnati Reds	RHP	Prairiland High School (TX)
18	Phil Clark	Detroit Tigers	C	Crockett High School (TX)
19	Mike White	Los Angeles Dodgers	OF	Loudon High School (TN)
20	Grady Hall	Chicago White Sox	LHP	Northwestern
21	Lee May Jr.	New York Mets	OF	Purcell Marian High School (OH)
22	Lee Stevens	California Angels	OF	Lawrence High School (KS)
23	Luis Alicea	St. Louis Cardinals	2B	Florida State University
24	Tony Clements	Kansas City Royals	SS	Don Antonio Lugo High School (CA)
25	Terry Carr	California Angels	OF	Bennett High School (MD)
26	Earl Sanders	Toronto Blue Jays	RHP	Jackson State
27	Mike Fetters	California Angels	RHP	Pepperdine
28	Daryl Green	California Angels	RHP	Nacogdoches High School ((TX))

== Other notable players ==
- Kirt Manwaring, 2nd round, 31st overall by the San Francisco Giants
- Roger Pavlik†, 2nd round, 32nd overall by the Texas Rangers
- Erik Hanson†, 2nd round, 36th overall by the Seattle Mariners
- Kevin Tapani, 2nd round, 40th overall by the Oakland Athletics
- Dave Hansen, 2nd round, 47th overall by the Los Angeles Dodgers
- Todd Zeile, 2nd round, 55th overall by the St. Louis Cardinals
- Jack Armstrong†, 3rd round, 58th overall by the San Francisco Giants, but did not sign
- Dean Palmer†, 3rd round, 59th overall by the Texas Rangers
- Tuffy Rhodes, 3rd round, 68th overall by the Houston Astros
- Scott Cooper†, 3rd round, 69th overall by the Boston Red Sox
- Reggie Jefferson, 3rd round, 72nd overall by the Cincinnati Reds
- Scott Radinsky, 3rd round, 75th overall by the Chicago White Sox
- Rudy Seánez, 4th round, 83rd overall by the Cleveland Indians
- Kent Bottenfield†, 4th round, 96th overall by the Montreal Expos
- Paul Sorrento, 4th round, 103rd overall by the California Angels
- Mark Guthrie, 4th round, 104th overall by the St. Louis Cardinals, but did not sign
- Bo Jackson†, 4th round, 105th overall by the Kansas City Royals
- Xavier Hernandez, 4th round, 107th overall by the Toronto Blue Jays
- Joe Girardi†, 5th round, 116th overall by the Chicago Cubs
- Pat Hentgen†, 5th round, 133rd overall by the Toronto Blue Jays
- Tom Goodwin, 6th round, 134th overall by the Pittsburgh Pirates
- Eddie Taubensee, 6th round, 150th overall by the Cincinnati Reds
- Tom Gordon†, 6th round, 157th overall by the Kansas City Royals
- Chuck McElroy, 8th round, 192nd overall by the Philadelphia Phillies
- Hal Morris, 8th round, 210th overall by the New York Yankees
- Chuck Carr, 9th round, 228th overall by the Cincinnati Reds
- Stan Belinda, 10th round, 238th overall by the Pittsburgh Pirates
- Jeff Reboulet, 10th round, 247th overall by the Minnesota Twins
- Lance Blankenship, 10th round, 249th overall by the Oakland Athletics
- Mike Blowers, 10th round, 252nd overall by the Montreal Expos
- Tom Lampkin, 11th round, 265th overall by the Cleveland Indians
- Steve Finley†, 11th round, 268th overall by the Atlanta Braves, but did not sign
- Darryl Hamilton, 11th round, 269th overall by the Milwaukee Brewers
- Keith Lockhart, 11th round, 280th overall by the Cincinnati Reds
- Willie Blair, 11th round, 289th overall by the Toronto Blue Jays
- Rey Sánchez, 13th round, 319th overall by the Texas Rangers
- Rod Beck†, 13th round, 327th overall by the Oakland Athletics
- Scott Kamieniecki, 14th round, 366th overall by the New York Yankees
- Greg Hibbard, 16th round, 417th overall by the Kansas City Royals
- Tim Salmon, 18th round, 450th overall by the Atlanta Braves, but did not sign
- Chuck Knoblauch†, 18th round, 452nd overall by the Philadelphia Phillies, but did not sign
- Turner Ward, 18th round, 470th overall by the New York Yankees
- Chris Hoiles, 19th round, 489th overall by the Detroit Tigers
- Kevin Maas, 22nd round, 572nd overall by the New York Yankees
- Rick Wilkins, 23rd round, 582nd overall by the Chicago Cubs
- Rick Reed†, 26th round, 644th overall by the Pittsburgh Pirates
- Paul Quantrill†, 26th round, 660th overall by the Los Angeles Dodgers, but did not sign
- Cal Eldred, 26th round, 661st overall by the New York Mets, but did not sign
- Ben McDonald, 27th round, 670th overall by the Atlanta Braves, but did not sign
- John Olerud†, 27th round, 682nd overall by the New York Mets, but did not sign
- Eric Anthony, 34th round, 795th overall by the Houston Astros
- Scott Erickson†, 36th round, 821st overall by the New York Mets, but did not sign
- Todd Jones†, 41st round, 864th overall by the New York Mets, but did not sign

† All-Star
‡ Hall of Famer

=== Other professional athletes drafted ===
- Johnny Johnson, 34th round, 796th overall by the Montreal Expos, but did not sign
- Tony Meola, New York Yankees, did not sign

Preceded by B.J. Surhoff	1st Overall Picks; Jeff King	Succeeded by Ken Griffey Jr.
