= Mo Sanford =

American baseball player (born 1966)

- Pitcher
- Born: December 24, 1966 (age 59); Americus, Georgia, U.S.
- Batted: Right Threw: Right

MLB debut
- August 9, 1991, for the Cincinnati Reds

Last MLB appearance
- June 6, 1995, for the Minnesota Twins

MLB statistics
- Win–loss record: 2–4
- Earned run average: 4.81
- Strikeouts: 84
- Stats at Baseball Reference

Teams
- Cincinnati Reds (1991); Colorado Rockies (1993); Minnesota Twins (1995)

Meredith Leroy Sanford Jr. (born December 24, 1966) is an American former professional baseball pitcher for the Cincinnati Reds, Colorado Rockies, and Minnesota Twins.

== Career ==
Sanford pitched five games for Cincinnati in August 1991 recording eight strikeouts in his debut against the San Diego Padres, but was not in the majors in 1992. He was selected by Colorado with the 62nd pick in the 1992 expansion draft, and appeared in 11 games, starting six, in the Rockies' inaugural season. After a season in the minors, Sanford pitched 11 games in relief for Minnesota in 1995.
