= Alex Cole =

American baseball player (1965–2023)

- Center fielder
- Born: August 17, 1965; Fayetteville, North Carolina, U.S.
- Died: August 11, 2023 (aged 57); Chesterfield, Virginia, U.S.
- Batted: Left Threw: Left

MLB debut
- July 27, 1990, for the Cleveland Indians

Last MLB appearance
- May 22, 1996, for the Boston Red Sox

MLB statistics
- Batting average: .280
- Home runs: 5
- Runs batted in: 117
- Stats at Baseball Reference

Teams
- Cleveland Indians (1990–1992); Pittsburgh Pirates (1992); Colorado Rockies (1993); Minnesota Twins (1994–1995); Boston Red Sox (1996)

Alexander Cole Jr. (August 17, 1965 – August 11, 2023) was an American professional baseball outfielder. He played for five teams in Major League Baseball from 1990 to 1996.

== Career ==
Drafted by the St. Louis Cardinals in the second round of the 1985 Major League Baseball draft, Cole made his major league debut with the Cleveland Indians on July 27, 1990, and appeared in his final game on May 22, 1996. Cole stole five bases in one game on August 1, 1990 and, known as a stolen base threat (Cole ranked fourth in the American League in 1990 with 40 stolen bases despite playing in only 63 games), the Indians in 1991 cited his speed as a prime reason for moving back the outfield walls of Cleveland Municipal Stadium. This effort, however, resulted in the Indians hitting only 22 home runs at home for the year. Cole again stole five bases in a game against the California Angels on May 3, 1992.

After being traded from the Indians midway through the 1992 season, Cole briefly played with the Pittsburgh Pirates before becoming a member of the inaugural Colorado Rockies team in 1993. He was the starting center fielder and the number two batter in the lineup in the Rockies' first game, against the New York Mets at Shea Stadium on April 5, 1993. Cole batted .256 and stole 30 bases in 1993.

After spending two years with the Minnesota Twins, Cole signed with the Boston Red Sox and spent most of the 1996 season in Triple-A. His final MLB game was on May 22, 1996.

Cole spent most of the rest of his baseball career in the independent minor leagues. He started off 1997 playing for the Madison Black Wolf of the Northern League, then was acquired by the Florida Marlins and played for the Triple-A Charlotte Knights. He played for Mayas de Chetumal and Sultanes de Monterrey in the Mexican League in 1998 before finishing his career playing three years with the Bridgeport Bluefish of the Atlantic League.

== Personal life and death ==
Cole attended George Wythe High School in Richmond, Virginia. His father played sports in college at Fayetteville State University. He then attended State College of Florida.

In 2002, Cole pleaded guilty to a charge of conspiring to possess heroin with intent to distribute. He was sentenced to 18 months in federal prison.

Cole died on August 11, 2023, at the age of 57.
