= Kent Bottenfield =

American baseball player (born 1968)

- Pitcher
- Born: November 14, 1968 (age 57); Portland, Oregon, U.S.
- Batted: Right Threw: Right

MLB debut
- July 6, 1992, for the Montreal Expos

Last MLB appearance
- June 9, 2001, for the Houston Astros

MLB statistics
- Win–loss record: 46–49
- Earned run average: 4.54
- Strikeouts: 566
- Stats at Baseball Reference

Teams
- Montreal Expos (1992–1993); Colorado Rockies (1993–1994); San Francisco Giants (1994); Chicago Cubs (1996–1997); St. Louis Cardinals (1998–1999); Anaheim Angels (2000); Philadelphia Phillies (2000); Houston Astros (2001)

Career highlights and awards
- All-Star (1999)

Kent Dennis Bottenfield (born November 14, 1968) is an American former professional baseball pitcher, who played in Major League Baseball (MLB) for the Montreal Expos, Colorado Rockies, San Francisco Giants, Chicago Cubs, St. Louis Cardinals, Anaheim Angels, Philadelphia Phillies, and Houston Astros, from 1992 to 2001.

== Career ==
Bottenfield was drafted by the Montreal Expos in the fourth round (96th overall) of the 1986 MLB draft.

Bottenfield's best season came in 1999 with the Cardinals, when he posted an 18–7 record with a 3.97 ERA. Bottenfield played in the MLB All-Star Game that year and allowed two earned runs on one hit and one walk. He faced seven batters in his inning while throwing 30 pitches. Bottenfield struck out Iván Rodríguez and Derek Jeter in the appearance, however he took the loss on behalf of starter Curt Schilling. The following season, he was traded along with Adam Kennedy to the Angels for Jim Edmonds. During the 2000 season, the Angels traded Bottenfield to the Phillies for Ron Gant. He finished the season with an 8–10 record and a 5.40 ERA for the Angels and Phillies. In the offseason, he signed with the Astros as a free agent for the 2001 season but did not appear in the major leagues following this season.

== Post-playing career ==
After overcoming a near-fatal heart condition, Bottenfield turned his attention to music. He has released two independent Christian music albums "Take Me Back" (2004) and the newest release "Back In The Game" (2007).

He currently resides in Florida with his family and is the head coach of the Palm Beach Atlantic University baseball team. After being named associate head coach in August 2011, he was named to replace head coach Gary Carter after Carter died of cancer in February 2012.
