= Jerald Clark =

American baseball player (born 1963)

- Left fielder
- Born: August 10, 1963 (age 62); Crockett, Texas, U.S.
- Batted: Right Threw: Right

MLB debut
- September 19, 1988, for the San Diego Padres

Last MLB appearance
- July 17, 1995, for the Minnesota Twins

MLB statistics
- Batting average: .257
- Home runs: 44
- Runs batted in: 208
- Stats at Baseball Reference

Teams
- San Diego Padres (1988–1992); Colorado Rockies (1993); Yakult Swallows (1994); Minnesota Twins (1995)

Jerald Dwayne Clark (born August 10, 1963) is an American former professional outfielder. He is an alumnus of Lamar University and played for the Lamar Cardinals baseball team.

Drafted by the San Diego Padres in the 12th round of the 1985 Major League Baseball draft, Clark made his Major League Baseball debut with the Padres on September 19, 1988, and appeared in his final game on July 17, 1995. Jerald's brother, Phil Clark, also played in the majors.

Clark was a member of the inaugural Colorado Rockies team that began play in Major League Baseball in 1993.

== Expansion draft ==
On November 17, 1992, Clark was taken as the 7th pick from the Padres in the Colorado Rockies expansion draft .

== Stealing home ==
In 1992, as a member of the Padres, Clark accomplished the rare feat of stealing home. Los Angeles Dodgers catcher Mike Scioscia and manager Tommy Lasorda went to the pitcher's mound to discuss strategy. In the meantime, Clark alertly realized they did not call time and sprinted home. This turned out to be a keen play by Clark and an embarrassing moment to the Dodgers.
