= Keith Shepherd =

American baseball player (born 1968)

- Pitcher
- Born: January 21, 1968 (age 57); Wabash, Indiana, U.S.
- Batted: Right Threw: right

Professional debut
- MLB: September 6, 1992, for the Philadelphia Phillies
- CPBL: August 26, 1997, for the Brother Elephants

Last appearance
- MLB: August 4, 1996, for the Baltimore Orioles
- CPBL: August 26, 1997, for the Brother Elephants

MLB statistics
- Win–loss record: 2–5
- Earned run average: 6.71
- Strikeouts: 34
- Stats at Baseball Reference

Teams
- Philadelphia Phillies (1992); Colorado Rockies (1993); Boston Red Sox (1995); Baltimore Orioles (1996); Brother Elephants (1997)

Keith Wayne Shepherd (born January 21, 1968) is an American former baseball middle relief pitcher. Shepherd played in Major League Baseball (MLB) from 1992 through 1996 for the Philadelphia Phillies (1992), Colorado Rockies (1993), Boston Red Sox (1995) and Baltimore Orioles (1996). Listed at 6' 2", 205 lb., Shepherd batted and threw right-handed.

== Career ==
Shepherd was selected by the Pittsburgh Pirates in the 1986 MLB draft.

Shepherd pitched for nine different MLB organizations from 1986 to 1997, including parts of four seasons in the MLB. He posted a 2–5 record with a 6.71 earned run average and three saves in 41 appearances for the Phillies, Rockies, Red Sox and Orioles. In 185 minor league appearances, he went 19–31 with 4.97 ERA and 32 saves. Keith Shepherd has pitched since 1998 for various teams in the Fort Wayne, Indiana 18 and over league. He also served as the assistant baseball coach under Justin Denney at Wabash High School.

Shepherd also pitched in the Brother Elephants of the Chinese Professional Baseball League (CPBL).

== Personal Issues ==
Shepherd was involved in a shooting that occurred in the City of Wabash on December 23, 2016. Wabash Police identified the victim of the shooting as Keith W. Shepherd, 48, Wabash. Wabash Police alleged at the time that the suspect in the shooting was Christina M. Bowman, 50, Wabash.
