= Danny Sheaffer =

American baseball player (born 1961)

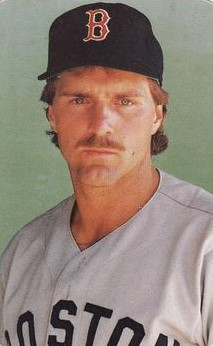
- Catcher
- Born: August 2, 1961 (age 64); Jacksonville, Florida, U.S.
- Batted: Right Threw: Right

MLB debut
- April 9, 1987, for the Boston Red Sox

Last MLB appearance
- September 27, 1997, for the St. Louis Cardinals

MLB statistics
- Batting average: .232
- Home runs: 13
- Runs batted in: 110
- Stats at Baseball Reference

Teams
- Boston Red Sox (1987); Cleveland Indians (1989); Colorado Rockies (1993–1994); St. Louis Cardinals (1995–1997)

Danny Todd Sheaffer (born August 2, 1961) is an American former Major League Baseball catcher and third baseman and former manager of the Princeton Rays, the Rookie League affiliate of the Tampa Bay Rays. Scheaffer was a minor league baseball coach within the Houston Astros organization. From 2009 through 2012, he was the minor league catching instructor. Previously, he was the manager of the Round Rock Express (2007), the Astros' Triple-A affiliate, and the Memphis Redbirds (2003–2006).

== Early and personal life ==
Sheaffer was born on August 2, 1961, in Jacksonville, Florida. He is an alumnus of Clemson University.

== Playing career ==
Drafted by the Boston Red Sox in the 1st round of the 1981 MLB amateur draft, Sheaffer would make his Major League Baseball debut with the Boston Red Sox on April 9, 1987, and appear in his final game on September 27, 1997.

Sheaffer was a member of the inaugural Colorado Rockies team that began play in Major League Baseball in 1993.

Sheaffer finished out his playing career with the St. Louis Cardinals. He played 25 games for the Memphis Redbirds, Cards' Triple-A team.

== Coaching ==
In the middle of the 2003 season, the Memphis Redbirds named Sheaffer as their manager, replacing Tom Spencer. During his tenure, the Redbirds went 244-266 (.478), with one second-place finish and two third-place finishes in the Pacific Coast League's American Northern division.

On November 23, 2009, Sheaffer joined the Houston Astros organization as a catching coordinator in its minor league system. His contract was not renewed by the Astros after the 2012 season.

Scheaffer was named manager of the Princeton Rays of the Appalachian League on January 24, 2013.
