= Jayhawk Owens =

American baseball player (born 1969)

- Catcher
- Born: February 10, 1969 (age 57); Cincinnati, Ohio, U.S.
- Batted: Right Threw: Right

MLB debut
- June 6, 1993, for the Colorado Rockies

Last MLB appearance
- September 28, 1996, for the Colorado Rockies

MLB statistics
- Batting average: .232
- Home runs: 11
- Runs batted in: 36
- Stats at Baseball Reference

Teams
- Colorado Rockies (1993–1996)

Claude Jayhawk Owens II (born February 10, 1969) is an American former professional baseball catcher. He played four seasons in Major League Baseball (MLB) from 1993 to 1996, all for the Colorado Rockies.

A graduate of Glen Este High School in Cincinnati, Owens played college baseball at Middle Tennessee State University. He was drafted by the Minnesota Twins in the second round of the 1990 Major League Baseball draft, and began his professional career that season with the Kenosha Twins. After playing two more seasons in their organization, he was left unprotected in the 1992 expansion draft, where he was selected by the Rockies with the 23rd pick.

Owens was a member of the inaugural Colorado Rockies team that began play in Major League Baseball in 1993. He split four seasons between the Rockies and their top farm team, the Colorado Springs Sky Sox, playing his final MLB game on September 28, 1996. After spending the entire 1997 season with the Sky Sox, he became a free agent, returning to the Twins organization to start 1998. He moved to the Cincinnati Reds system partway through the season, spending the rest of 1998 and all of 1999 with their organization before retiring.

Following his playing career, Owens remained with the Reds organization as a minor league coach and manager. In his first season as a manager, he guided the Stockton Ports to the California League championship. The next season, he managed the Potomac Cannons, then spent four seasons as the manager of the minor league Chattanooga Lookouts, with his last season coming in 2007. He has a daughter named Grace, a son named Walker, and a wife named Jennifer.

Owens has Cherokee heritage from his paternal grandmother, and his middle name "Jayhawk" reflects this. During his college career and the early days of his professional career, he was simply listed on rosters as "J. Owens", until the story of his name was discovered by a member of the media. Since then, he has used "Jayhawk" as his preferred form of address.
