= Chris Jones (1990s outfielder) =

American baseball player (born 1965)

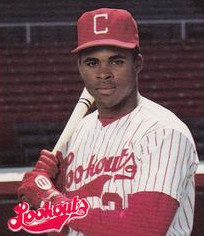
- Jones in 1988
- Outfielder
- Born: December 16, 1965 (age 60); Utica, New York, U.S.
- Batted: Right Threw: Right

MLB debut
- April 21, 1991, for the Cincinnati Reds

Last MLB appearance
- July 29, 2000, for the Milwaukee Brewers

MLB statistics
- Batting average: .252
- Home runs: 30
- Runs batted in: 131
- Stats at Baseball Reference

Teams
- Cincinnati Reds (1991); Houston Astros (1992); Colorado Rockies (1993–1994); New York Mets (1995–1996); San Diego Padres (1997); Arizona Diamondbacks (1998); San Francisco Giants (1998); Milwaukee Brewers (2000)

Christopher Carlos Jones (born December 16, 1965) is an American former professional baseball outfielder. Jones made his Major League Baseball debut with the Cincinnati Reds on April 21, 1991, and appeared in his final game with the Milwaukee Brewers on July 29, 2000.

== Career ==
He graduated in 1984 from Liverpool High School located in Liverpool suburb of Syracuse, New York. He was drafted by the Cincinnati Reds in the 3rd round of the 1984 Major League Baseball draft, and spent the next six seasons in the Reds' farm system. He played in 52 games in his rookie year before being released by the Reds and signed by the Houston Astros.

After a season with Houston, Jones was a member of the inaugural Colorado Rockies team that began play in Major League Baseball in 1993, and spent two years with the team, as well as two years with the New York Mets. He spent 1997 with the San Diego Padres then played for the inaugural Arizona Diamondbacks team in 1998. After playing for the San Francisco Giants and Milwaukee Brewers, he played in the minor leagues until 2004.

In 2004 Jones signed to play for the Newark Bears of the independent Atlantic League, following his retirement he returned to manage the Bears for two seasons from 2005 to 2006. the team went 100-165 during his time in Newark. In January 2007, he took over as manager of the Kannapolis Intimidators, a minor league affiliate of the Chicago White Sox.

Jones currently lives now in Phoenix, Arizona, with his wife, Cystal, and two children, Christopher and Crishana.
