= Jim Tatum (baseball) =

American baseball player (born 1967)

- Utility player
- Born: October 9, 1967 (age 58); San Diego, California, U.S.
- Batted: Right Threw: Right

Professional debut
- MLB: September 18, 1992, for the Milwaukee Brewers
- NPB: July 4, 1997, for the Yakult Swallows
- KBO: April 5, 2000, for the LG Twins

Last appearance
- NPB: October 23, 1997, for the Yakult Swallows
- MLB: June 11, 1998, for the New York Mets
- KBO: April 26, 2000, for the LG Twins

MLB statistics
- Batting average: .194
- Home runs: 3
- Runs batted in: 29

NPB statistics
- Batting average: .309
- Home runs: 13
- Runs batted in: 25

KBO statistics
- Batting average: .292
- Home runs: 4
- Runs batted in: 10
- Stats at Baseball Reference

Teams
- Milwaukee Brewers (1992); Colorado Rockies (1993, 1995); Boston Red Sox (1996); San Diego Padres (1996); Yakult Swallows (1997); New York Mets (1998); LG Twins (2000)

James Ray Tatum (born October 9, 1967) is an American former professional baseball utility player. He played in Major League Baseball (MLB) for the Milwaukee Brewers, Colorado Rockies, Boston Red Sox, San Diego Padres, and New York Mets. Tatum also played in Nippon Professional Baseball (NPB) for the Yakult Swallows and in the KBO League for the LG Twins.

== Career ==
Tatum was drafted by the San Diego Padres in the third round of the 1985 Major League Baseball draft. He was released by the Padres organization in 1988, and signed with the Cleveland Indians organization in 1989. After being released by the Indians, Tatum signed with the Milwaukee Brewers in 1990, and made his MLB debut with them in 1992, appearing in five games.

In November 1992, Tatum was drafted by the Colorado Rockies in the 1992 Major League Baseball expansion draft. More than half of the games he would play in MLB came with the Rockies in 1993, where he hit .204 with one home run and 12 runs batted in (RBI) in 92 games, used mostly as a pinch hitter. He remained with the Rockies organization until November 1, 1995, when he signed with the Boston Red Sox as a free agent. He appeared in only two games for Boston in 1996 before being traded to the San Diego Padres for cash considerations. Tatum appeared in five games with the Padres in the 1996 season and became a free agent at the end of the season. In 1997, Tatum signed with the Yakult Swallows of Nippon Professional Baseball (NPB), and appeared in 51 games, hitting .309 with 13 home runs and 25 RBI. He returned to MLB in 1998, playing in 35 games for the New York Mets. After spending the 1999 season with the Rockies organization, Tatum played in the minors for the San Francisco Giants in 2000, before joining the LG Twins of the KBO League for 20 games. With the Twins, Tatum hit .292 with four home runs and 12 RBI. he did not continue his playing career past the 2000 season. Tatum appeared in 1,481 total minor league games, and hit .289 with 172 home runs and 882 RBI.
