= Braulio Castillo (baseball) =

Dominican baseball player (born 1968)

- Outfielder
- Born: May 13, 1968 (age 58); Elías Piña, Dominican Republic
- Batted: Right Threw: Right

MLB debut
- August 18, 1991, for the Philadelphia Phillies

Last MLB appearance
- October 4, 1992, for the Philadelphia Phillies

MLB statistics
- Batting average: .188
- Home runs: 2
- Runs batted in: 9
- Stats at Baseball Reference

Teams
- Philadelphia Phillies (1991–1992)

Braulio Robinson Medrano Castillo (born May 13, 1968) is a Dominican former professional baseball outfielder, who played in Major League Baseball (MLB) with the Philadelphia Phillies. He batted and threw right-handed.

== Baseball career ==
Signed by the Los Angeles Dodgers as an amateur free agent in 1985, Castillo was traded to the Phillies, in exchange for relief pitcher Roger McDowell, on July 31, 1991. He made his big league debut with the Phillies, on August 18, 1991, and appeared in his final game on October 4, 1992.
