= Pedro Castellano =

Venezuelan baseball player (born 1970)

- Third baseman
- Born: March 11, 1970 (age 56); Barquisimeto, Lara, Venezuela
- Batted: Right Threw: Right

MLB debut
- May 30, 1993, for the Colorado Rockies

Last MLB appearance
- June 3, 1996, for the Colorado Rockies

MLB statistics
- Batting average: .161
- Home runs: 3
- Runs batted in: 9
- Stats at Baseball Reference

Teams
- Colorado Rockies (1993, 1995–1996); Yomiuri Giants (1997)

Career highlights and awards
- 1992 Caribbean Series All-star team

Pedro Orlando Castellano Arrieta (born March 11, 1970), is a Venezuelan former professional baseball third baseman/first baseman.

== Career ==
He played in Major League Baseball (MLB) for the Colorado Rockies (1993, 1995–1996), in Nippon Professional Baseball (NPB) for the Yomiuri Giants (1997).

Castellano was a career .161 hitter (15-for-93) with three home runs, nine RBI, 13 runs, two doubles and one stolen base in 51 games. Castellano played for the Tecolotes de Nuevo Laredo of the Mexican League in 2010.

== See also ==
- List of Major League Baseball players from Venezuela
