= David Nied =

American baseball player (born 1968)

- Pitcher
- Born: December 22, 1968 (age 57); Dallas, Texas, U.S.
- Batted: Right Threw: Right

MLB debut
- September 1, 1992, for the Atlanta Braves

Last MLB appearance
- September 27, 1996, for the Colorado Rockies

MLB statistics
- Win–loss record: 17–18
- Earned run average: 5.06
- Strikeouts: 146
- Stats at Baseball Reference

Teams
- Atlanta Braves (1992); Colorado Rockies (1993–1996)

David Glen Nied (born December 22, 1968) is an American former professional baseball pitcher. He played in Major League Baseball for the Atlanta Braves and Colorado Rockies from 1992 through 1996.

== Career ==
Nied attended Duncanville High School in Duncanville, Texas. He was drafted out of high school by the Atlanta Braves in the 14th round of the 1987 Major League Baseball draft. Baseball America rated Nied as the 56th best prospect in baseball prior to the 1992 season and the 23rd best prospect in baseball prior to the 1993 season.

Despite excelling in 1992 spring training, Nied was optioned to the Triple-A Richmond Braves to start the 1992 season. He made his major league debut for the Braves on September 1, 1992, after MLB rosters expanded.

Nied was the first pick for the expansion Colorado Rockies in the 1992 Major League Baseball expansion draft. Nied started in the first ever game for the Rockies, taking the loss against the New York Mets. He also pitched a number of other firsts for the Rockies, including first strikeout, first walk, first complete game, and first complete game shutout.

Nied compiled a 5–9 won-loss record in 1993 then went 9–7 in 1994 but won no more games through the next two years. He suffered an elbow injury during spring training in 1995, missing most of the season. He spent most of 1996 in the minor leagues, pitching poorly enough that he was eventually demoted to class A.

Following the 1996 season, Nied was granted free agency and joined the Cincinnati Reds organization on November 14, 1996, but never appeared in a game in the majors or minors again. When the Reds tried to send him back down to the minor leagues in March, he instead chose to retire.

== Personal life ==
Nied now sells equipment for his father's agricultural products company. He is married to his second wife, Heather Cranford, who is a former contestant on the TV show The Bachelor. Nied has four sons, two each from both marriages.
