= Roberto Mejía =

Dominican baseball player (born 1972)

- Second baseman
- Born: April 14, 1972 (age 54); Hato Mayor del Rey, Dominican Republic
- Batted: Right Threw: Right

MLB debut
- July 15, 1993, for the Colorado Rockies

Last MLB appearance
- April 11, 1997, for the Chicago White Sox

MLB statistics
- Batting average: .247
- Home runs: 31
- Runs batted in: 102

KBO statistics
- Batting average: .259
- Home runs: 3
- Runs batted in: 13

CPBL statistics
- Batting average: .286
- Home runs: 0
- Runs batted in: 5
- Stats at Baseball Reference

Teams
- Colorado Rockies (1993–1995); St. Louis Cardinals (1997); Hanwha Eagles (2003); Macoto Cobras (2004)

Roberto Antonio Mejía Díaz (born April 14, 1972) is a Dominican former professional baseball second baseman. He played all or part of four seasons in Major League Baseball between 1993 and 1997, and one season in the Korea Baseball Organization in 2003. He most recently played for the El Paso Diablos of the American Association of Independent Professional Baseball in 2009.

== Career ==
Signed by the Los Angeles Dodgers as an amateur free agent in 1988, Mejia made his major league debut with the Colorado Rockies on July 15, 1993, during their inaugural season. He appeared in his final major league game on April 11, 1997, with the St. Louis Cardinals. Since then, he has continued to play professionally, including several seasons in the Mexican League. In 2003, he played for the Hanwha Eagles of the KBO.
