= Ryan Hawblitzel =

American baseball player (born 1971)

- Pitcher
- Born: April 30, 1971 (age 55); West Palm Beach, Florida, U.S.
- Batted: Right Threw: Right

MLB debut
- June 9, 1996, for the Colorado Rockies

Last MLB appearance
- August 5, 1996, for the Colorado Rockies

MLB statistics
- Win–loss record: 0–1
- Earned run average: 6.00
- Strikeouts: 7
- Stats at Baseball Reference

Teams
- Colorado Rockies (1996)

Ryan Wade Hawblitzel (born April 30, 1971) is an American former professional baseball right-handed pitcher.

Drafted by the Chicago Cubs in the 2nd round of the 1990 Major League Baseball draft. Hawblitzel would make his Major League Baseball (MLB) debut with the Colorado Rockies on June 9, 1996, and appeared in his final game on August 5, 1996.

== High school career ==
Hawblitzel attended John I. Leonard High School in Lake Worth, Florida and graduated in 1990. During his senior season, he finished with a 9-2 record, 133 strikeouts in 75 innings, and had a 1.38 earned-run average. He also played shortstop where he led the district and regional champion Lancers (20-10) with a .386 batting average (32 for 83) and had 14 RBI, 27 runs scored, 10 doubles, one triple and two home runs. Hawblitzel was named Sun-Sentinel Class 3A-4A Player of the Year. He was also named to the first team on the Class 4A all-state team as a utility player.
