= Gary Wayne =

American baseball player (born 1962)

- Pitcher
- Born: November 30, 1962 (age 63); Dearborn, Michigan, U.S.
- Batted: Left Threw: Left

MLB debut
- April 7, 1989, for the Minnesota Twins

Last MLB appearance
- June 3, 1994, for the Los Angeles Dodgers

MLB statistics
- Win–loss record: 14–14
- Earned run average: 3.93
- Strikeouts: 164
- Stats at Baseball Reference

Teams
- Minnesota Twins (1989–1992); Colorado Rockies (1993); Los Angeles Dodgers (1994)

Gary Anthony Wayne (born November 30, 1962) is an American former Major League Baseball left-handed pitcher. He played for the Minnesota Twins, Colorado Rockies, and Los Angeles Dodgers between 1989 and 1994.

== Early life ==
Wayne graduated from Crestwood High School in 1980. He is an alumnus of the University of Michigan. In 1983, he played collegiate summer baseball in the Cape Cod Baseball League for the Yarmouth-Dennis Red Sox.

== Career ==
Drafted by the Montreal Expos in the 4th round of the 1984 MLB amateur draft, Wayne would make his Major League Baseball debut with the Minnesota Twins on April 7, 1989, and appeared in his final game on June 3, 1994.

Wayne was a member of the inaugural Colorado Rockies team that began play in Major League Baseball in 1993.
