= Marcus Moore =

American baseball player (born 1970)

- Pitcher
- Born: November 2, 1970 (age 55); Oakland, California, U.S.
- Batted: Switch Threw: Right

MLB debut
- July 8, 1993, for the Colorado Rockies

Last MLB appearance
- June 5, 1996, for the Cincinnati Reds

MLB statistics
- Win–loss record: 7–5
- Earned run average: 6.25
- Strikeouts: 73
- Stats at Baseball Reference

Teams
- Colorado Rockies (1993–1994); Cincinnati Reds (1996)

Marcus Braymont Moore (born November 2, 1970) is an American former Major League Baseball player. A pitcher, Moore played for the Colorado Rockies and Cincinnati Reds. He last played professional baseball in 1999 with the Syracuse Sky Chiefs.
