= Armando Reynoso =

Mexican baseball player (born 1966)

- Pitcher
- Born: May 1, 1966 (age 60); Lagos de Moreno, Jalisco, Mexico
- Batted: Right Threw: Right

MLB debut
- August 11, 1991, for the Atlanta Braves

Last MLB appearance
- September 29, 2002, for the Arizona Diamondbacks

MLB statistics
- Win–loss record: 68–62
- Earned run average: 4.74
- Strikeouts: 554
- Stats at Baseball Reference

Teams
- Atlanta Braves (1991–1992); Colorado Rockies (1993–1996); New York Mets (1997–1998); Arizona Diamondbacks (1999–2002)

Member of the Mexican Professional

Baseball Hall of Fame
- Induction: 2010

Martín Armando Reynoso Gutiérrez (born May 1, 1966) is a Mexican former professional baseball right-handed pitcher.

== Career ==
During a 12-year baseball career, Reynoso compiled 68 wins, 554 strikeouts, and a 4.74 earned run average. He pitched from 1991 to 2002 for four teams, including the inaugural Colorado Rockies team that began play in 1993. That ‘93 season turned out to be Reynoso's best in the big leagues. As the ace of the Rockies, he started 30 games, winning 12, with 4 complete games, 117 strikeouts in 189 innings pitched. During the ‘94 and ‘95 seasons he only saw action in 29 games due to multiple injuries, starting 27 and winning 10. In 1996 started 30 games going 8–9 for the Rockies. That same year, Reynoso was on the mound for the Rockies when slugger Barry Bonds stole his 40th base of the season to become the second player in major league history with 40 home runs and 40 stolen bases. In 1997, Reynoso saw limited action for the New York Mets, however he won 7 of his 11 starts of the season, going 7–3 with a 3.89 ERA. In 1999 he started 27 games for the Arizona Diamondbacks, going 10–6 in 167 innings pitched. In the year 2000 he started 30 games for the Diamondbacks, winning 11 decisions and 2 complete games in 170 innings pitched.

Reynoso was the last player on the Atlanta Braves to wear number 42 before it was retired by Major League Baseball in 1997. In 2001, Reynoso gave up the first career home run to Albert Pujols.

For his career, Reynoso averaged 12 wins, 33 starts and 176 innings pitched per every 162 games played. Reynoso was primarily a starter during his career (186 starts in 198 total appearances) but on October 3, 1992, as a member of the Braves, he did pick up his one and only MLB save in a shortened game against the Padres. In game 161 of the season, he nailed down a 1-0 Braves win over the Padres, preserving the win for starter Charlie Leibrandt.

Reynoso was the bullpen coach for the Mexico national baseball team in the 2009 World Baseball Classic.

In March 2010, Armando was inducted to the Mexican Professional Baseball Hall of Fame.
