= Darren Holmes (baseball) =

American baseball player (born 1966)

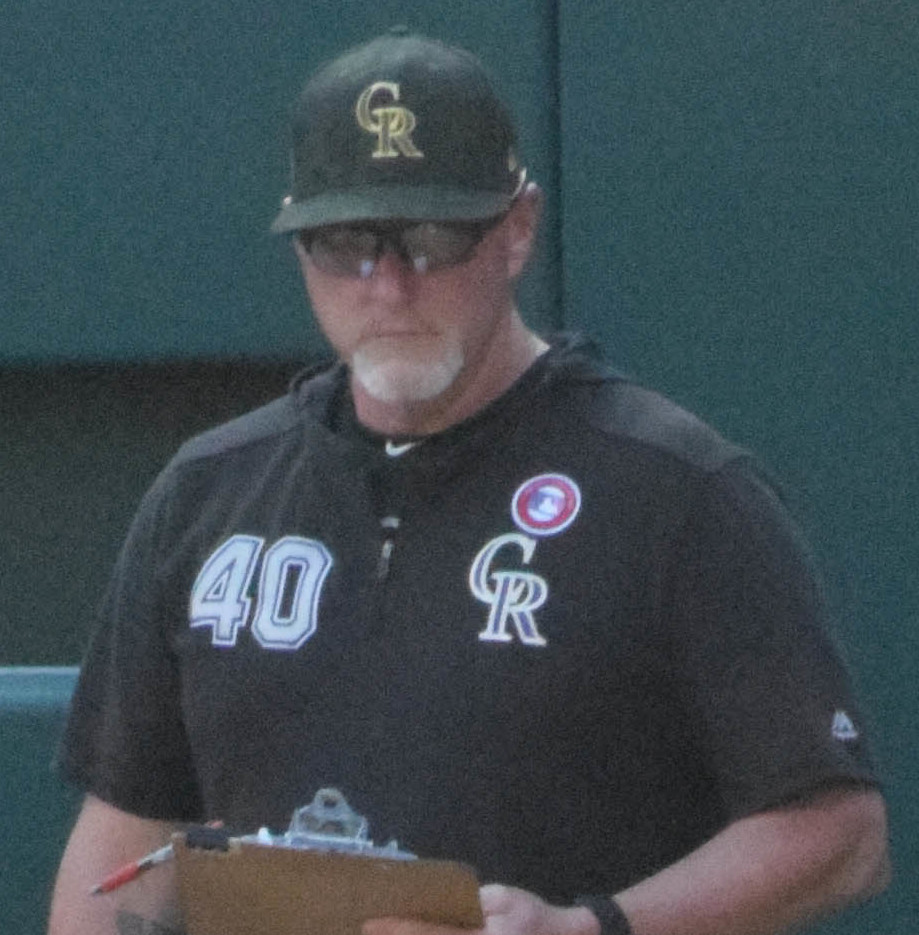
- Holmes with the Colorado Rockies in 2019

North Greenville Trailblazers
- Pitcher
- Born: April 25, 1966 (age 60); Asheville, North Carolina, U.S.
- Batted: Right Threw: Right

MLB debut
- September 1, 1990, for the Los Angeles Dodgers

Last MLB appearance
- September 27, 2003, for the Atlanta Braves

MLB statistics
- Win–loss record: 35–33
- Earned run average: 4.25
- Strikeouts: 581
- Stats at Baseball Reference

Teams
- As player: Los Angeles Dodgers (1990); Milwaukee Brewers (1991–1992); Colorado Rockies (1993–1997); New York Yankees (1998); Arizona Diamondbacks (1999–2000); St. Louis Cardinals (2000); Baltimore Orioles (2000); Atlanta Braves (2002–2003); As coach: Colorado Rockies (2015–2019); Baltimore Orioles (2020–2023); Chicago Cubs (2024)

Darren Lee Holmes (born April 25, 1966) is an American former professional baseball pitcher. Holmes played in Major League Baseball (MLB) from 1990 to 2003 for the Los Angeles Dodgers, Milwaukee Brewers, Colorado Rockies, New York Yankees, Arizona Diamondbacks, St. Louis Cardinals, Baltimore Orioles, and Atlanta Braves.

== Professional career ==
=== Early years ===
Holmes was born and raised in Asheville, North Carolina, and attended T. C. Roberson High School, where he excelled in football, basketball, and baseball. He was selected in the 16th round of the 1984 MLB draft by the Los Angeles Dodgers and opted to turn professional and forgo his baseball scholarship at UNC Chapel Hill.

=== Los Angeles Dodgers ===
Holmes went 0–1 in 14 games in 1990, his first action in the Major Leagues. On December 20, he was traded to the Milwaukee Brewers for Bert Heffernan.

=== Milwaukee Brewers ===
In his first season with the Brewers, he was 1–4 with an ERA over 4.00, although he picked up his first three saves. He pitched to a 4–4 record the following year but had a 4.72 ERA. Following the season, he was taken by the Colorado Rockies in the expansion draft.

=== Colorado Rockies ===
Holmes first season in Colorado was not similar to his last in Milwaukee. He had a 3–3 record but his ERA rose to 4.05. In the strike-shortened 1994 season, Holmes went 0–3 with an ERA over 6.00. When play resumed in 1995, he had a revival, going 6–1 with an ERA of 3.24 and helping the Rockies reach the playoffs. He threw 1 2/3 innings over three games and allowed six hits and two runs while striking out two. In 1996, he again posted a 5–4 record with a 3.97 ERA. His 1997 season is considered his breakout year. Despite a high 5.34 ERA, he was 9–2 on the season. On October 27, 1997, Holmes was granted free agency.

=== New York Yankees ===
Holmes signed with the Yankees on December 22, 1997. In 34 relief appearances with the Yankees, Holmes posted an 0–3 record and a 3.33 ERA. Despite not earning a win in the regular season, and picking up two saves, he appeared on the Yankees postseason roster and earned a World Series ring when the Yankees swept the Padres in 1998.

=== Arizona Diamondbacks ===
Holmes was traded to the Diamondbacks on March 3, 1999, for Ben Ford and Izzy Molina. He went 4–3 with a 3.70 ERA over 44 games. On April 28, 2000, he was released after posting an 11.57 ERA.

=== 2000 ===
Holmes signed with the Cardinals on May 4, 2000. He was 0–1 with a 9.72 ERA before being traded to the Orioles on June 28. In five games, he posted a 25.07 ERA. He was released on July 19. On August 11, he was signed by the Diamondbacks again. He had a 6.75 ERA in four games. Overall, he finished 2000 with a 13.03 ERA in 18 games. He was released on October 13.

=== Atlanta Braves ===
Holmes did not sign with anyone for the 2001 season. He made a comeback in 2002 with the Braves, where he was 2–2 with a 1.81 ERA over 55 games. He also threw 2 2/3 innings in the 2002 National League Division Series, allowing one hit while striking out five. He was re-signed after the season.

In 2003, he was 1–2 with a 4.29 ERA in 48 games. He retired after the season, citing his desire to spend time with his family. He still resides in Asheville and is an entrepreneur.

== Coaching career ==
Holmes was the Colorado Rockies bullpen coach from 2015 through the 2019 season.

On December 23, 2019, Holmes was named the bullpen coach of the Baltimore Orioles. On October 25, 2023, it was announced that Holmes would be leaving the Orioles organization.

On December 20, 2023, Holmes was hired by the Chicago Cubs to serve as the team's bullpen coach. On October 1, 2024, it was announced that Holmes and the Cubs would be parting ways.

On January 24, 2025, Holmes was announced as the pitching coach for North Greenville University.

== See also ==
- List of Major League Baseball players named in the Mitchell Report
