= Scott Fredrickson =

American baseball player (born 1967)

- Pitcher
- Born: August 19, 1967 (age 58); Manchester, New Hampshire, U.S.
- Batted: Right Threw: Right

MLB debut
- April 30, 1993, for the Colorado Rockies

Last MLB appearance
- July 23, 1993, for the Colorado Rockies

MLB statistics
- Win–loss record: 0–1
- Earned run average: 6.21
- Strikeouts: 20
- Stats at Baseball Reference

Teams
- Colorado Rockies (1993); Brother Elephants (1997)

Scott Eric Fredrickson (born August 19, 1967) is an American former Major League Baseball right-handed pitcher. He is an alumnus of Judson High School in Converse, Texas, and the University of Texas at Austin.

Drafted by the San Diego Padres in the 14th round of the 1990 MLB amateur draft, Fredrickson would make his Major League Baseball debut with the Colorado Rockies on April 30, 1993, and appeared in his final game on July 23, 1993.

Fredrickson was a member of the inaugural Colorado Rockies team that began play in Major League Baseball in 1993.

== Personal life ==
Fredrickson currently lives in Cypress, TX with his wife Becky. They have 3 children (Jake, Emily and Tucker).

== Sources ==
- Career statistics from Baseball Reference · Baseball Reference (Minors) · Retrosheet · Baseball Almanac
