= Steve Reed (baseball) =

American baseball player (born 1965)

- Pitcher
- Born: March 11, 1965 (age 61); Los Angeles, California, U.S.
- Batted: Right Threw: Right

MLB debut
- August 30, 1992, for the San Francisco Giants

Last MLB appearance
- July 5, 2005, for the Baltimore Orioles

MLB statistics
- Win–loss record: 49–44
- Earned run average: 3.63
- Strikeouts: 630
- Stats at Baseball Reference

Teams
- San Francisco Giants (1992); Colorado Rockies (1993–1997); San Francisco Giants (1998); Cleveland Indians (1998–2001); Atlanta Braves (2001); San Diego Padres (2002); New York Mets (2002); Colorado Rockies (2003–2004); Baltimore Orioles (2005)

Steven Vincent Reed (born March 11, 1965) is an American former relief pitcher in Major League Baseball.

== Biography ==
Reed was born in Los Angeles, California and graduated from Chatsworth High School. He played college baseball at Lewis-Clark State College, and played summer collegiate baseball for the Hazlet Elks of the Saskatchewan Major Baseball League prior to playing in the majors.

Reed was signed by the San Francisco Giants as an amateur free agent in 1988. His career stats are: 49 wins, 44 losses, 3.63 ERA, 18 saves, 630 strikeouts, and 285 BB, in 833 games (870.2 innings).

As of 2024, Reed remains the Rockies franchise leader in games pitched at 461, and is one of only two pitchers in Rockies franchise history to pitch 400 or more games in a Rockies uniform, the other being Brian Fuentes.
