= 1995 Colorado Rockies season =

1995 Colorado Rockies
- National League Wild Card winners
- League: National League
- Division: West
- Ballpark: Coors Field
- City: Denver, Colorado
- Record: 77–67 (.535)
- Divisional place: 2nd
- Owner: Jerry McMorris
- General manager: Bob Gebhard
- Manager: Don Baylor
- Television: KWGN-TV (Dave Campbell, Charlie Jones)
- Radio: KOA (AM) (Wayne Hagin, Jeff Kingery); KCUV (Francisco Gamez, Carlos Bido)
- Stats: ESPN.com; Baseball Reference

The 1995 Colorado Rockies season was their 3rd in Major League Baseball and their 1st season at Coors Field. Don Baylor was the manager.

The team competed in the National League West, finishing with a record of 77−67, second in the division. The Rockies simultaneously won the first-ever National League wild card berth in the first season of the revised postseason format and first postseason appearance in franchise history. They faced the eventual World Series champion Atlanta Braves in the National League Division Series (NLDS), who won this first round series in four games, with the Rockies taking game three.

== Offseason ==
- December 5, 1994: Drafted Bobby Jones from the Milwaukee Brewers in the 1994 Rule 5 draft.
- December 15, 1994: Joe Grahe was signed as a free agent by the Colorado Rockies.
- April 8, 1995: Signed free agent starting pitcher Bill Swift and right fielder Larry Walker.
- April 10, 1995: Marcus Moore was traded by the Colorado Rockies to the Cincinnati Reds for Chris Sexton.

== Regular season ==
The start to the 1995 MLB regular season was delayed over three weeks by the 1994–95 Major League Baseball strike that ended on April 2. As a result, the season only lasted 144 games (instead of the typical 162 game season) and "official" opening day for Coors Field was changed to April 26. The Colorado Rockies played two exhibition games on April 2 and 3 against the New York Yankees as the first baseball to be played at Coors Field.

In his Rockies debut and inaugural game of Coors Field on April 26 versus the New York Mets, Larry Walker doubled three times, including one that tied the score with two outs in the ninth inning. Dante Bichette hit a walk-off home run in the fourteenth inning for an 11−9 win. On May 7, 1995, Walker hit his 100th career home run versus Hideo Nomo of Los Angeles.

The Rockies led the NL in hits (1,406), runs scored (785), triples (43, also the most in the majors), home runs (200), runs batted in (749), batting average (.282) and slugging percentage (.471). Conversely, they also allowed the most hits (1,443), runs (783), earned runs (711) and produced the fewest shutouts (1).

A quartet of Rockies hitters who became known as "The Blake Street Bombers", consisting of Dante Bichette, Vinny Castilla, Andrés Galarraga (Walker's former Expos teammate), and Larry Walker, each contributed at least 30 home runs in 1995. The Rockies simultaneously won the first-ever National League wild card berth under the revised postseason format and first playoff appearance in franchise history in just their third season of play.

On October 1 for the final regular season game, the Rockies needed a win at Coors Field versus the San Francisco Giants to avoid playing a tie-breaker game with the Houston Astros for the National League Wild Card post-season berth. Using seven pitchers during the nine inning game, Curt Leskanic earned his 10th save and threw the final pitch of the game in a 10–9 victory for the Rockies. During a post-season interview, Leskanic recalled the pitching mound shaking like a mild earthquake with the vibrations from fans in the stadium anticipating their first ever appearance in the MLB post-season.

During the playoffs, Larry Walker collected three hits in 14 at bats in the National League Division Series (NLDS) versus the Atlanta Braves. He hit his first career postseason home run off Tom Glavine in the sixth inning of a 7−4 Game 2 loss. The Braves defeated the Rockies in four games.

=== Season standings ===
NL West
Team	W	L	Pct.	GB	Home	Road
Los Angeles Dodgers	78	66	.542	—	39‍–‍33	39‍–‍33
Colorado Rockies	77	67	.535	1	44‍–‍28	33‍–‍39
San Diego Padres	70	74	.486	8	40‍–‍32	30‍–‍42
San Francisco Giants	67	77	.465	11	37‍–‍35	30‍–‍42

=== Wild Card standings ===
Team	W	L	Pct.	GB
Colorado Rockies	77	67	.535	—
Houston Astros	76	68	.528	1
Chicago Cubs	73	71	.507	4
San Diego Padres	70	74	.486	7
New York Mets	69	75	.479	8
Philadelphia Phillies	69	75	.479	8

=== Record vs. opponents ===
1995 National League record Source: MLB Standings Grid – 1995
Team	ATL	CHC	CIN	COL	FLA	HOU	LAD	MON	NYM	PHI	PIT	SD	SF	STL
Atlanta	—	8–4	8–5	9–4	10–3	6–6	5–4	9–4	5–8	7–6	4–2	5–2	7–1	7–5
Chicago	4–8	—	3–7	6–7	8–4	5–8	7–5	3–5	4–3	6–1	8–5	5–7	5–7	9–4
Cincinnati	5–8	7–3	—	5–7	6–6	12–1	4–3	8–4	7–5	9–3	8–5	3–6	3–3	8–5
Colorado	4–9	7–6	7–5	—	5–7	4–4	4–9	7–1	5–4	4–2	8–4	9–4	8–5	5–7
Florida	3–10	4–8	6–6	7–5	—	8–4	3–7	6–7	7–6	6–7	5–8	3–2	5–3	4–3
Houston	6–6	8–5	1–12	4–4	4–8	—	3–2	9–3	6–6	5–7	9–4	7–4	5–3	9–4
Los Angeles	4–5	5–7	3–4	9–4	7–3	2–3	—	7–5	6–6	4–9	9–4	7–6	8–5	7–5
Montreal	4–9	5–3	4–8	1–7	7–6	3–9	5–7	—	7–6	8–5	4–4	7–5	7–6	4–3
New York	8–5	3–4	5–7	4–5	6–7	6–6	6–6	6–7	—	7–6	4–3	6–7	5–8	3–4
Philadelphia	6–7	1–6	3–9	2–4	7–6	7–5	9–4	5–8	6–7	—	6–3	6–6	6–6	5–4
Pittsburgh	2–4	5–8	5–8	4–8	8–5	4–9	4–9	4–4	3–4	3–6	—	4–8	6–6	6–7
San Diego	2–5	7–5	6–3	4–9	2–3	4–7	6–7	5–7	7–6	6–6	8–4	—	6–7	7–5
San Francisco	1–7	7–5	3–3	5–8	3–5	3–5	5–8	6–7	8–5	6–6	6–6	7–6	—	7–6
St. Louis	5–7	4–9	5–8	7–5	3–4	4-9	5–7	3–4	4–3	4–5	7–6	5–7	6–7	—

=== Transactions ===
- June 1, 1995: Todd Helton was drafted by the Colorado Rockies in the 1st round of the 1995 amateur draft. Player signed July 1, 1995.
- June 1, 1995: Ben Petrick was drafted by the Colorado Rockies in the 2nd round of the 1995 amateur draft. Player signed August 9, 1995.
- July 31, 1995: Bret Saberhagen was traded by the New York Mets with a player to be named later to the Colorado Rockies for Juan Acevedo and Arnold Gooch (minors). The New York Mets sent David Swanson (minors) (August 4, 1995) to the Colorado Rockies to complete the trade.

=== Major League debuts ===
- Batters:
  - Jason Bates (Apr 26)
  - Jorge Brito (Apr 30)
  - Craig Counsell (Sep 17)
  - Quinton McCracken (Sep 17)
- Pitchers:
  - Roger Bailey (Apr 27)
  - Juan Acevedo (Apr 30)
  - Bryan Rekar (Jul 19)

=== Roster ===
1995 Colorado Rockies
Roster
Pitchers: 49 Juan Acevedo; 38 Roger Bailey; 44 Marvin Freeman; 55 Joe Grahe; 47 Bryan Hickerson; 40 Darren Holmes; 16 Curtis Leskanic; 43 Mike Munoz; 17 David Nied; 47 Omar Olivares; 28 Lance Painter; 39 Steve Reed; 56 Bryan Rekar; 42 Armando Reynoso; 30 Kevin Ritz; 18 Bruce Ruffin; 31 Bret Saberhagen; 48 A. J. Sager; 20 Bill Swift; 32 Mark Thompson	Catchers: 27 Jorge Brito; 7 Joe Girardi; 11 Matt Nokes; 34 Jayhawk Owens; Infielders: 6 Jason Bates; 15 Pedro Castellano; 9 Vinny Castilla; 4 Craig Counsell; 14 Andrés Galarraga; 8 Roberto Mejía; 35 John Vander Wal; 22 Walt Weiss; 21 Eric Young	Outfielders: 10 Dante Bichette; 26 Ellis Burks; 1 Trent Hubbard; 12 Mike Kingery; 3 Quinton McCracken; 24 Harvey Pulliam; 19 Jim Tatum; 33 Larry Walker	Manager: 25 Don Baylor; Coaches: 36 Larry Bearnarth (pitching); 2 Gene Glynn (third base); 41 Art Howe (hitting/first base); 37 Rick Mathews (bullpen); 23 Don Zimmer (bench)

=== Game log ===
1995 regular season game log: 77–67 (Home: 44–28; Away: 33–39)
April: 4–1 (Home: 2–0; Away: 2–1)

#	Date	Opponent	Score	Win	Loss	Save	Attendance	Record
1	April 26	Mets	11–9 (14)	Thompson (1–0)	Remlinger (0–1)	–	47,228	1–0
2	April 27	Mets	8–7	Reed (1–0)	Lomon (0–1)	–	38,087	2–0
3	April 28	@ Astros	2–1	Leskanic (1–0)	Kile (0–1)	Ruffin (1)	30,405	3–0
4	April 29	@ Astros	2–1	Olivares (1–0)	Hampton (0–1)	Ruffin (2)	19,074	4–0
5	April 30	@ Astros	1–3	Brocail (1–0)	Leskanic (1–)	Hudek (1)	14,455	4–1

May: 13–15 (Home: 7–5; Away: 6–10)

#	Date	Opponent	Score	Win	Loss	Save	Attendance	Record
6	May 1	Padres	8–3	Holmes (1–0)	Mauser (0–1)	–	40,117	5–1
7	May 2	Padres	6–5 (11)	Bailey (1–0)	Williams (0–1)	–	38,387	6–1
8	May 3	Padres	12–7	Bailey (2–0)	Hamilton (0–1)	Ruffin (3)	37,193	7–1
9	May 5	Dodgers	4–6	Martínez (2–1)	Olivares (1–1)	Seánez (3)	46,395	7–2
10	May 6	Dodgers	11–17	Williams (1–0)	Acevedo (0–1)	–	48,394	7–3
11	May 7	Dodgers	10–12	Daal (2–0)	Reed (1–1)	Valdez (1)	48,117	7–4
12	May 9	Giants	10–6	Ritz (1–0)	Wilson (2–1)	–	41,307	8–4
13	May 10	Giants	8–5	Holmes (2–0)	Bautista (0–1)	–	43,690	9–4
14	May 11	Giants	10–4	Acevedo (1–1)	Mulholland (2–2)	Reed (1)	45,609	10–4
15	May 12	@ Marlins	10–6	Swift (1–0)	Gardner (0–4)	Ruffin (4)	22,267	11–4
16	May 13	@ Marlins	2–8	Witt (1–2)	Freeman (0–1)	–	33,626	11–5
17	May 14	@ Marlins	6–3	Ritz (2–0)	Rapp (0–3)	Ruffin (5)	20,490	12–5
18	May 15	@ Braves	0–4	Mercker (1–1)	Olivares (1–2)	–	27,009	12–6
19	May 16	@ Braves	3–15	Smoltz (2–2)	Acevedo (1–2)	–	25,516	12–7
20	May 17	@ Braves	6–5	Holmes (3–0)	Maddux (2–1)	Ruffin (6)	27,070	13–7
21	May 18	@ Braves	2–3	McMichael (3–0)	Munoz (0–1)	Borbón (2)	26,205	13–8
22	May 19	@ Reds	0–2	Schourek (1–2)	Ritz (2–1)	Brantley (2)	25,688	13–9
23	May 20	@ Reds	9–10 (10)	Smith (1–1)	Bailey (2–1)	–	29,401	13–10
24	May 21	@ Reds	5–2	Acevedo (2–2)	Jarvis (1–2)	Holmes (1)	23,629	14–10
25	May 22	Cubs	9–8	Munoz (1–1)	Myers (0–1)	–	47,325	15–10
26	May 23	Cubs	6–7	Foster (3–2)	Freeman (0–2)	Myers (9)	43,226	15–11
27	May 24	Cubs	3–5	Castillo (3–1)	Bailey (2–2)	Myers (10)	45,367	15–12
28	May 26	@ Pirates	2–4	Wagner (1–5)	Acevedo (2–3)	Miceli (6)	11,183	15–13
29	May 27	@ Pirates	4–9	Neagle (4–1)	Swift (1–1)	–	16,082	15–14
30	May 28	@ Pirates	6–3	Freeman (1–2)	White (0–1)	Ruffin (7)	15,016	16–14
31	May 29	@ Cardinals	5–6 (11)	Habyan (1–1)	Bailey (2–3)	–	26,889	16–15
32	May 30	@ Cardinals	5–8	Hill (4–0)	Grahe (0–1)	Henke (10)	15,251	16–16
33	May 31	@ Cardinals	5–3	Acevedo (3–3)	Petkovsek (0–1)	Holmes (2)	19,297	17–16

June: 15–12 (Home: 8–7; Away: 7–5)

#	Date	Opponent	Score	Win	Loss	Save	Attendance	Record
34	June 2	Pirates	7–4	Holmes (4–0)	McCurry (0–1)		45,828	18–16
35	June 3	Pirates	7–6	Ritz (3–1)	Lieber (1–5)	Holmes (3)	48,144	19–16
36	June 4	Pirates	4–1	Grahe (1–1)	Wagner (1–7)	Leskanic (1)	48,061	20–16
37	June 5	Cardinals	5–9	Petkovsek (1–1)	Acevedo (3–4)		46,649	20–17
38	June 6	Cardinals	5–4	Leskanic (2–1)	Parrett (2–2)		46,621	21–17
39	June 7	Cardinals	7–3	Freeman (2–2)	Jackson (0–7)		46,704	22–17
40	June 8	@ Cubs	5–3	Ritz (4–1)	Foster (4–3)	Reed (2)	24,757	23–17
41	June 9	@ Cubs	2–1 (10)	Holmes (5–0)	Pérez (0–4)	Munoz (1)	21,905	24–17
42	June 10	@ Cubs	0–3	Morgan (2–1)	Acevedo (3–5)	Myers (14)	32,460	24–18
43	June 11	@ Cubs	5–1	Thompson (2–0)	Trachsel (2–4)	Leskanic (2)	27,245	25–18
44	June 12	Reds	6–11	Jarvis (3–3)	Freeman (2–3)		47,708	25–19
45	June 13	Reds	6–4	Ritz (5–1)	Pugh (4–1)	Leskanic (3)	48,198	26–19
46	June 14	Reds	10–4	Grahe (2–1)	Schourek (4–3)	–	48,255	27–19
47	June 16	Braves	0–2	Glavine (5–3)	Swift (1–2)	–	48,163	27–20
48	June 17	Braves	1–7	Avery (2–4)	Acevedo (3–6)	–	50,035	27–21
49	June 18	Braves	4–9	Mercker (4–3)	Freeman (2–4)	–	48,302	27–22
50	June 19	Marlins	2–7	Hammond (4–1)	Ritz (5–2)	–	48,145	27–23
51	June 20	Marlins	2–7	Mathews (2–0)	Grahe (2–2)	–	48,143	27–24
52	June 21	Marlins	6–3	Swift (2–2)	Rapp (2–4)	Reed (3)	48,117	28–24
53	June 22	@ Padres	3–2	Reynoso (1–0)	Dishman (0–1)	Ruffin (8)	11,653	29–24
54	June 23	@ Padres	2–3	Ashby (4–4)	Freeman (2–5)	Hoffman (10)	15,418	29–25
55	June 24	@ Padres	0–2	Hamilton (3–2)	Ritz (5–3)	–	36,137	29–26
56	June 25	@ Padres	11–3	Grahe (3–2)	Sanders (5–4)	–	20,776	30–26
57	June 27	@ Giants	5–1	Swift (3–2)	Bautista (2–4)	–	14,769	31–26
58	June 28	@ Giants	1–2 (11)	Barton (1–0)	Munoz (1–2)	–	15,136	31–27
59	June 29	@ Dodgers	0–3	Nomo (6–1)	Freeman (2–6)	–	46,295	31–28
60	June 30	@ Dodgers	2–1	Ritz (6–3)	Candiotti (4–6)	Munoz (2)	34,253	32–28

July: 17–11 (Home: 11–3; Away: 6–10)

#	Date	Opponent	Score	Win	Loss	Save	Attendance	Record
61	July 1	@ Dodgers	4–5	Worrell (2–0)	Bailey (2–4)	–	54,006	32–29
62	July 2	@ Dodgers	10–1	Swift (4–2)	Martínez (7–6)	–	37,354	33–29
63	July 3	Astros	15–10	Bailey (3–4)	Dougherty (3–1)	Holmes (4)	50,028	34–29
64	July 4	Astros	8–16	Hampton (3–3)	Olivares (1–3)	–	50,127	34–30
65	July 5	Astros	4–2	Ritz (7–3)	Kile (3–8)	Holmes (5)	48,091	35–30
66	July 6	Expos	9–6	Grahe (4–2)	Fassero (8–6)	Holmes (6)	48,073	36–30
67	July 7	Expos	12–7	Acevedo (4–6)	Heredia (3–5)	–	50,111	37–30
68	July 8	Expos	8–3	Reynoso (2–0)	Henry (3–7)	Leskanic (4)	48,190	38–30
69	July 9	Expos	4–1	Freeman (3–6)	Martínez (6–5)	–	48,114	39–30
70	July 13	@ Mets	2–4	Jones (5–6)	Ritz (7–4)	Franco (10)	15,276	39–31
71	July 14	@ Mets	13–4	Pulsipher (2–4)	Reynoso (2–1)		15,377	39–32
72	July 15	@ Mets	5–4	Swift (5–2)	Saberhagen (5–5)	Holmes (7)	17,120	40–32
73	July 16	@ Mets	1–2 (10)	Franco (4–1)	Thompson (2–1)	–	25,994	40–33
74	July 17	Phillies	8–5	Munoz (2–2)	Bottalico (3–2)	Holmes (8)	48,070	41–33
75	July 18	Phillies	5–7	Schilling (7–5)	Ritz (7–5)	Slocumb (22)	48,011	41–34
76	July 19	Phillies	5–3	Rekar (1–0)	Green (8–6)	Holmes (9)	48,087	42–34
77	July 20	Phillies	7–3	Swift (6–2)	Quantrill (7–6)	–	48,037	43–34
78	July 21	Mets	1–12	Harnisch (2–7)	Reynoso (2–2)	–	48,059	43–35
79	July 22	Mets	5–4	Leskanic (3–1)	Henry (1–4)	Holmes (10)	48,042	44–35
80	July 23	Mets	8–5	Ritz (8–5)	Jones (6–7)	Holmes (11)	48,129	45–35
81	July 24	@ Phillies	11–3	Rekar (2–0)	Green (8–7)	–	25,424	46–35
82	July 25	@ Phillies	6–7 (10)	Slocumb (2–0)	Munoz (2–3)	–	25,837	46–36
83	July 26	@ Astros	3–4	Kile (4–10)	Reynoso (2–3)	Jones (9)	19,209	46–37
84	July 27	@ Astros	4–5 (12)	Jones (6–1)	Munoz (2–4)	–	21,734	46–38
85	July 28	@ Expos	8–3	Ritz (9–5)	Urbina (2–2)	–	19,221	47–38
86	July 29	@ Expos	5–3	Rekar (3–0)	Fassero (10–;8)	Holmes (12)	23,595	48–38
87	July 30	@ Expos	4–11	Martínez (9–6)	Freeman (3–7)	–	27,172	48–39
88	July 31	@ Expos	3–2	Reynoso (3–3)	Henry (6–8)	Holmes (13)	14,978	49–39

August: 11–17 (Home: 7–9; Away: 4–8)

#	Date	Opponent	Score	Win	Loss	Save	Attendance	Record
89	August 1	Dodgers	6–9	Valdez (8–6)	Thompson (2–2)	Worrell (19)	48,071	49–40
90	August 2	Dodgers	7–10	Tapani (7–11)	Ritz (9–6)	–	48,063	49–41
91	August 3	Dodgers	9–4	Saberhagen (6–5)	Martínez (11–7)	–	48,024	50–41
92	August 4	Padres	14–12	Reed (2–1)	Berumen (2–3)	Holmes (14)	48,125	51–41
93	August 5	Padres	7–3	Reynoso (4–3)	Ashby (7–6)	–	48,043	52–41
94	August 6	Padres	8–16	Dishman (3–4)	Thompson (2–3)	–	48,157	52–42
95	August 8	@ Marlins	4–5 (13)	Groom (2–3)	Bailey (3–5)	–	31,220	52–43
96	August 9	@ Marlins	1–2	Burkett (10–10)	Ritz (9–7)	Nen (13)	31,805	52–44
97	August 10	@ Marlins	2–3	Peña (3–1)	Reed (2–2)	–	28,009	52–45
98	August 11	@ Braves	3–5	Avery (5–8)	Reynoso (4–4)	Wohlers (16)	47,408	52–46
99	August 12	@ Braves	16–4	Leskanic (4–1)	Mercker (6–7)	–	48,777	53–46
100	August 13	@ Braves	2–3	Wohlers (6–3)	Holmes (5–1)		43,279	53–47
101	August 14	@ Reds	0–4	Burba (7–2)	Ritz (9–8)	–	23,945	53–48
102	August 15	@ Reds	3–11	Portugal (6–8)	Rekar (3–1)	–	24,506	53–49
103	August 16	@ Reds	6–4	Reynoso (5–4)	Smiley (11–2)	Painter (1)	25,024	54–49
104	August 17	Cubs	12–5	Bailey (4–5)	Navarro (10–5)	–	48,071	55–49
105	August 18	Cubs	7–26	Young (2–4)	Saberhagen (6–6)	–	48,082	55–50
106	August 19	Cubs	5–6	Castillo (8–6)	Ritz (9–9)	Myers (28)	48,020t	55–;51
107	August 20	Cubs	4–2	Leskanic (5–1)	Wendell (2–1)	–	50,087	56–51
108	August 22	Pirates	1–10	Loaiza (8–5)	Reynoso (5–5)	–	48,083	56–52
109	August 23	Pirates	9–5	Bailey (5–5)	Neagle (11–6)	–	48,027	57–52
110	August 24	Pirates	8–6	Painter (1–0)	Wagner (2–12)	Leskanic (5)	48,041	58–52
111	August 25	Cardinals	3–8	Morgan (5–7)	Rekar (3–2)	Mathews (1)	48,012	58–53
112	August 26	Cardinals	4–5	Fossas (3–0)	Ruffin (0–1)	Henke (28)	48,127	58–54
113	August 27	Cardinals	5–10	Barber (2–0)	Reynoso (5–6)	–	48,043	58–55
114	August 28	@ Pirates	6–3	Bailey (6–5)	Powell (0–2)	Leskanic (6)	8,242	59–55
115	August 29	@ Pirates	0–4	Wagner (3–13)	Ritz (9–10)	–	7,634	59–56
116	August 30	@ Pirates	6–0	Rekar (4–2)	Ericks (3–7)	–	8,120	60–56

September: 16–11 (Home: 8–4; Away: 8–7)

#	Date	Opponent	Score	Win	Loss	Save	Attendance	Record
117	September 1	@ Cardinals	4–5	DeLucia (7–6)	Leskanic (5–2)	Henke (30)	21,164	60–57
118	September 2	@ Cardinals	6–1	Bailey (7–5)	Watson (5–7)	–	26,796	61–57
119	September 3	@ Cardinals	5–4 (11)	Holmes (6–1)	Parrett (3–5)	Ruffin (9)	22,188	62–57
120	September 4	@ Cubs	0–2	Castillo (9–8)	Rekar (4–3)	–	31,601	62–58
121	September 6	@ Cubs	10–4	Reynoso (6–6)	Bullinger (11–6)	–	23,034	63–58
122	September 8	Reds	10–5	Leskanic (6–2)	Carrasco (2–6)	–	48,026	64–58
123	September 9	Reds	6–2	Swift (7–2)	Wells (14–6)	Ritz (1)	48,085	65–58
124	September 10	Reds	5–4	Reed (3–2)	Carrasco (2–7)	Leskanic (7)	48,074	66–58
125	September 11	Braves	5–4 (12)	Hickerson (3–3)	Woodall (1–1)	–	48,056	67–58
126	September 12	Braves	12–2	Painter (2–0)	Avery (6–13)	Ritz (2)	48,013	68–58
127	September 13	Braves	7–9	Schmidt (2–0)	Bailey (7–6)	–	48,011	68–59
128	September 15	Marlins	6–3	Reed (4–2)	Burkett (13–12)	Leskanic (8)	48,010	69–59
129	September 16	Marlins	8–7	Reed (5–2)	Mathews (4–4)	Ruffin (10)	48,037	70–59
130	September 17	Marlins	0–17	Rapp (12–7)	Rekar (4–4)	–	48,035	70–60
131	September 18	@ Padres	5–1	Ritz (10–10)	Hamilton (6–9)	Ruffin (11)	10,596	71–60
132	September 19	@ Padres	4–15	Blair (7–4)	Reynoso (6–7)	–	10,321	71–61
133	September 20	@ Padres	10–2	Swift (8–2)	Dishman (4–8)	–	10,095	72–61
134	September 21	@ Giants	3–5	Valdez (4–4)	Grahe (4–3)	Beck (31)	12,968	72–62
135	September 22	@ Giants	6–1	Ritz (11–10)	Estes (0–2)	–	17,723	73–62
136	September 23	@ Giants	0–2	Brewington (5–4)	Rekar (4–5)	Beck (32)	28,538	73–63
137	September 24	@ Giants	3–1	Reynoso (7–7)	Leiter (10–11)	Leskanic (9)	34,472	74–63
138	September 25	@ Dodgers	3–4	Martínez (17–7)	Swift (8–3)	Worrell (31)	41,984	74–64
139	September 26	@ Dodgers	7–3	Saberhagen (7–6)	Candiotti (7–14)	–	44,415	75–64
140	September 27	@ Dodgers	4–7	Tapani (10–13)	Ritz (11–11)	Worrell (32)	53,856	75–65
141	September 28	Giants	4–12	Brewington (6–4)	Rekar (4–6)	–	48,023	75–66
142	September 29	Giants	7–10	Service (3–1)	Leskanic (6–3)	Beck (33)	48,017	75–67
143	September 30	Giants	9–3	Swift (9–3)	Mulholland (5–13)	–	48,023	76–67

October: 1–0 (Home: 1–0; Away: 0–0)

#	Date	Opponent	Score	Win	Loss	Save	Attendance	Record
144	October 1	Giants	10–9	Painter (3–0)	Leiter (10–12)	Leskanic (10)	48,039	77–67

== Playoffs ==
1995 Postseason game log: 1–3 (Home: 0–2; Away: 1–1)
NL Division Series vs. Atlanta Braves 1–3 (Home: 0–2; Away: 1–1)

Game	Date	Opponent	Score	Win	Loss	Save	Attendance	Record
1	October 3	Braves	4–5	Peña (1–0)	Leskanic (0–1)	Wohlers (1)	50,040	0–1
2	October 4	Braves	4–7	Peña (2–0)	Munoz (0–1)	Wohlers (2)	50,063	0–2
3	October 6	@ Braves	7–5 (10)	Holmes (1–0)	Wohlers (0–1)	Thompson (1)	51,300	1–2
4	October 7	@ Braves	4–10	Maddux (1–0)	Saberhagen (0–1)	–	50,027	1–3

== Player stats ==
= Indicates team leader

= Indicates league leader

=== Batting ===
==== Starters by position ====
Note: Pos = Position; G = Games played; AB = At bats; H = Hits; Avg. = Batting average; HR = Home runs; RBI = Runs batted in

Pos	Player	G	AB	H	Avg.	HR	RBI
C	Joe Girardi	125	462	121	.262	8	55
1B	Andrés Galarraga	143	554	155	.280	31	106
2B	Eric Young	120	366	116	.317	6	36
SS	Walt Weiss	137	427	111	.260	1	25
3B	Vinny Castilla	139	527	163	.309	32	90
LF	Dante Bichette	139	579	197	.340	40	128
CF	Mike Kingery	119	350	94	.269	8	37
RF	Larry Walker	131	494	151	.306	36	101

==== Other batters ====
Note: G = Games played; AB = At bats; H = Hits; Avg. = Batting average; HR = Home runs; RBI = Runs batted in

Player	G	AB	H	Avg.	HR	RBI
Jason Bates	116	322	86	.267	8	46
Ellis Burks	103	278	74	.266	14	49
John Vander Wal	105	101	35	.347	5	21
Trent Hubbard	24	58	18	.310	3	9
Roberto Mejia	23	52	8	.154	1	4
Jorge Brito	18	51	11	.216	0	7
Jayhawk Owens	18	45	11	.244	4	12
Jim Tatum	34	34	8	.235	0	4
Matt Nokes	10	11	2	.182	0	0
Pedro Castellano	4	5	0	.000	0	0
Harvey Pulliam	5	5	2	.400	1	3
Craig Counsell	3	1	0	.000	0	0
Quinton McCracken	3	1	0	.000	0	0

=== Pitching ===
==== Starting pitchers ====
Note: G = Games pitched; IP = Innings pitched; W = Wins; L = Losses; ERA = Earned run average; SO = Strikeouts

Player	G	IP	W	L	ERA	SO
Kevin Ritz	31	173.1	11	11	4.21	120
Bill Swift	19	105.2	9	3	4.94	68
Marvin Freeman	22	94.2	3	7	5.89	61
Armando Reynoso	20	93.0	7	7	5.32	40
Bryan Rekar	15	85.0	4	6	4.98	60
Juan Acevedo	17	65.2	4	6	6.44	40

==== Other pitchers ====
Note: G = Games pitched; IP = Innings pitched; W = Wins; L = Losses; ERA = Earned run average; SO = Strikeouts

Player	G	IP	W	L	ERA	SO
Roger Bailey	39	81.1	7	6	4.98	33
Joe Grahe	17	56.2	4	3	5.08	27
Mark Thompson	21	51.0	2	3	6.53	30
Bret Saberhagen	9	43.0	2	1	6.28	29
Omar Olivares	11	31.2	1	3	7.39	15

==== Relief pitchers ====
Note: G = Games pitched; W = Wins; L = Losses; SV = Saves; ERA = Earned run average; SO = Strikeouts

Player	G	W	L	SV	ERA	SO
Darren Holmes	68	6	1	14	3.24	61
Curtis Leskanic	76	6	3	10	3.40	107
Steve Reed	71	5	2	3	2.14	79
Mike Munoz	64	2	4	2	7.42	37
Bruce Ruffin	37	0	1	11	2.12	23
Lance Painter	33	3	0	1	4.37	36
Bryan Hickerson	18	1	0	0	11.88	12
A.J. Sager	10	0	0	0	7.36	10
David Nied	2	0	0	0	20.77	3

== Farm system ==
Level	Team	League	Manager
AAA	Colorado Springs Sky Sox	Pacific Coast League	Brad Mills
AA	New Haven Ravens	Eastern League	Paul Zuvella
A	Salem Avalanche	Carolina League	Bill Hayes
A	Asheville Tourists	South Atlantic League	Bill McGuire
A-Short Season	Portland Rockies	Northwest League	P. J. Carey
Rookie	AZL Rockies	Arizona League	Jack Maloof

LEAGUE CHAMPIONS: Colorado Springs

Records
Preceded by 1994	Colorado Rockies seasons 1995	Succeeded by 1996
