= 1995 National League Division Series =

American baseball games

Teams
Team (Wins)		Manager	Season
Cincinnati Reds (3)		Davey Johnson	85–59 (.590), GA: 9
Los Angeles Dodgers (0)		Tommy Lasorda	78–66 (.542), GA: 1
- Dates: October 3–6
- Television: NBC (Games 1–2); ABC (Game 3)
- TV announcers: Greg Gumbel and Joe Morgan (Games 1–2); Al Michaels, Jim Palmer, and Tim McCarver (Game 3)
- Radio: CBS
- Radio announcers: Jerry Coleman and Jim Hunter
- Umpires: Games 1–2: Ed Montague, Bob Davidson, Eric Gregg, Frank Pulli, Bruce Froemming, Gary Darling; Game 3: John McSherry, Jerry Layne, Joe West, Terry Tata, Harry Wendelstedt, Charlie Reliford

Teams
Team (Wins)		Manager	Season
Atlanta Braves (3)		Bobby Cox	90–54 (.625), GA: 21
Colorado Rockies (1)		Don Baylor	77–67 (.535), GB: 1
- Dates: October 3–7
- Television: NBC (Games 1–2); ABC (Games 3–4)
- TV announcers: Pete Van Wieren and Larry Dierker (Games 1–3); Al Michaels, Jim Palmer, and Tim McCarver (Game 4)
- Radio: CBS
- Radio announcers: Gene Elston and Gary Cohen
- Umpires: Games 1–2: John McSherry, Jerry Layne, Joe West, Terry Tata, Harry Wendelstedt, Charlie Reliford; Games 3–4: Ed Montague, Bob Davidson, Eric Gregg, Frank Pulli, Bruce Froemming, Gary Darling

The 1995 National League Division Series (NLDS), consisted of two best-of-five playoff series on the National League side of the 1995 postseason, began on Tuesday, October 3, and ended on Saturday, October 7, with the champions of the three NL divisions—along with a "wild card" team—participating in two series. This was the first NLDS held in the postseason since 1981. As a result of both leagues realigning into three divisions in 1994, it marked the first time in major league history that a team could qualify for postseason play without finishing in first place in its league or division. The teams were:

Under MLB's playoff format from 1995 to 1997, home field advantage was assigned to two of the three division champions on a rotating basis, regardless of record. The wild card team was then matched up against whichever of those two home-field division champions held the better record, unless it created an intradivisional matchup, as no two teams from the same division could be matched up in the Division Series, regardless of whether the format at the time would suggest such a matchup. Home field priority for division champions for the 1995 NL postseason was as follows: (1) Central, (2) East, (3) West. The matchups were:

- (1) Cincinnati Reds (NL Central champions) vs. (3) Los Angeles Dodgers (NL West champions): Reds won the series, 3–0.
- (2) Atlanta Braves (NL East champions) vs. (4) Colorado Rockies (Wild Card qualifier): Braves won the series, 3–1.

The format of the Division Series was the same as the League Championship Series prior to 1985, a five-game set wherein the first two games were played at one stadium and the last three at the other. This format was later changed in 1998 for the present 2–2–1 format, which has been used in the Division Series since except for 2012, when the 2–3 format was used again due to the addition of the Wild Card Game.

Every participant in this year's NLDS was a member of the old NL West in 1993 (Colorado's inaugural season).

The Reds and Braves went on to meet in the NL Championship Series (NLCS). The Braves became the National League champion and defeated the American League champion Cleveland Indians in the 1995 World Series.

== Matchups ==
=== Cincinnati Reds vs. Los Angeles Dodgers ===
Cincinnati won the series, 3–0.

Game	Date	Score	Location	Time	Attendance
1	October 3	Cincinnati Reds – 7, Los Angeles Dodgers – 2	Dodger Stadium	3:15	44,199
2	October 4	Cincinnati Reds – 5, Los Angeles Dodgers – 4	Dodger Stadium	3:21	46,051
3	October 6	Los Angeles Dodgers – 1, Cincinnati Reds – 10	Riverfront Stadium	3:27	53,276

=== Atlanta Braves vs. Colorado Rockies ===
Atlanta won the series, 3–1.

Game	Date	Score	Location	Time	Attendance
1	October 3	Atlanta Braves – 5, Colorado Rockies – 4	Coors Field	3:19	50,040
2	October 4	Atlanta Braves – 7, Colorado Rockies – 4	Coors Field	3:08	50,063
3	October 6	Colorado Rockies – 7, Atlanta Braves – 5 (10)	Atlanta–Fulton County Stadium	3:16	51,300
4	October 7	Colorado Rockies – 4, Atlanta Braves – 10	Atlanta–Fulton County Stadium	2:38	50,027

== Cincinnati vs. Los Angeles ==
=== Game 1 ===
October 3, 1995 5:05 pm (PDT) at Dodger Stadium in Los Angeles, California 85 °F (29 °C), sunny
Team	1	2	3	4	5	6	7	8	9	R	H	E
Cincinnati	4	0	0	0	3	0	0	0	0	7	12	0
Los Angeles	0	0	0	0	1	1	0	0	0	2	8	0
WP: Pete Schourek (1–0) LP: Ramón Martínez (0–1); Home runs: CIN: Benito Santiago (1); LAD: Mike Piazza (1); Attendance: 44,199; Boxscore

Pete Schourek of the Reds faced Ramón Martínez of the Dodgers in Game 1. Back-to-back singles with one out got the rally started in the top of the first for the Reds. After Reggie Sanders popped out, Hal Morris struck the game's first blow by doubling home the two runners on base. Then Benito Santiago hit a two-run home run to make it 4–0 Reds. In the top of the fifth, after a leadoff double and single, Benito Santiago's sacrifice fly made it 5–0 Reds. After a double, John Cummings relieved Martinez and allowed a two-run double to Jeff Branson. The Dodgers scored their first run of the game in the bottom of the fifth on Brett Butler's RBI single with two on, then added another run next inning on Mike Piazza's home run, but could not score again off Schourek, Mike Jackson or Jeff Brantley as the Reds took a 1–0 series lead with a 7–2 win.

=== Game 2 ===
October 4, 1995 5:05 pm (PDT) at Dodger Stadium in Los Angeles, California 75 °F (24 °C), sunny
Team	1	2	3	4	5	6	7	8	9	R	H	E
Cincinnati	0	0	0	2	0	0	0	1	2	5	6	0
Los Angeles	1	0	0	1	0	0	0	0	2	4	14	2
WP: Dave Burba (1–0) LP: Antonio Osuna (0–1) Sv: Jeff Brantley (1); Home runs: CIN: Reggie Sanders (1); LAD: Eric Karros 2 (2); Attendance: 46,051; Boxscore

Former 20-game winner John Smiley of the Reds faced Ismael Valdez of the Dodgers in Game 2. Eric Karros, who would drive in all the Dodgers runs, got them on the board with an RBI double in the first to score Brett Butler, who singled to leadoff and moved to second on a sacrifice bunt. Reggie Sanders put the Reds up 2–1 with a two-run home run in the top of the fourth, but Karros responded with a leadoff homer in the bottom of the inning to tie the game at two. Raúl Mondesí was ejected from the game in between innings in the eighth on his way to right field, when he badmouthed umpire Bob Davidson for a play at home in the seventh that went the Reds' way. In the eighth, the Reds took the lead on a Barry Larkin single that scored Mariano Duncan, who singled with one out and stole second off Antonio Osuna. In the ninth, the Reds loaded the bases on three walks with one out off Kevin Tapani, then Mark Lewis's fielder's choice off Mark Guthrie and Duncan's RBI single off Pedro Astacio made it 5–2 Reds. In the bottom half, a leadoff single off Jeff Brantley gave the Dodgers life. With one out, Karros hit his second home run of the game to make it 5–4 Reds. However, Brantley got the next two men out to save Game 2 and give the Reds a two-game lead going to Cincinnati.

=== Game 3 ===
October 6, 1995 8:07 pm (EDT) at Riverfront Stadium in Cincinnati, Ohio 65 °F (18 °C), clear
Team	1	2	3	4	5	6	7	8	9	R	H	E
Los Angeles	0	0	0	1	0	0	0	0	0	1	9	0
Cincinnati	0	0	2	1	0	4	3	0	X	10	11	2
WP: David Wells (1–0) LP: Hideo Nomo (0–1); Home runs: LAD: None; CIN: Ron Gant (1), Bret Boone (1), Mark Lewis (1); Attendance: 53,276; Boxscore

Soon-to-be-named National League Rookie of the Year Hideo Nomo of the Dodgers faced playoff-savvy David Wells of the Reds. A two-run home run by Ron Gant got the scoring started for the Reds in the third. The Dodgers would cut the lead in half when Eric Karros reached second due to right fielder Reggie Sanders dropping his fly ball, then scored on an RBI single by Raúl Mondesí in the fourth, but Bret Boone's home run in the bottom of the fourth gave the Reds that run back. Then, in the sixth, Nomo began to lose his control, giving up two singles, a walk, and wild pitch. Then pinch hitter Mark Lewis came up and socked a grand slam off Mark Guthrie to make it 7–1 Reds. Next inning, the Reds loaded the bases on a single and two walks off John Cummings when Mike Jackson cleared them to make it 10–1 Reds. The Dodgers changed pitchers five times as the Reds advanced to the 1995 National League Championship Series with a series sweep. As of 2026, this is the Reds' most recent playoff game victory at home and the most recent playoff series won by the Reds, who currently hold the longest playoff series win drought in all four major leagues.

=== Composite box ===
1995 NLDS (3–0): Cincinnati Reds over Los Angeles Dodgers

Team	1	2	3	4	5	6	7	8	9	R	H	E
Cincinnati Reds	4	0	2	3	3	4	3	1	2	22	29	2
Los Angeles Dodgers	1	0	0	2	1	1	0	0	2	7	31	2
Total attendance: 143,526 Average attendance: 47,842

== Atlanta vs. Colorado ==
=== Game 1 ===
October 3, 1995 6:10 pm (MDT) at Coors Field in Denver, Colorado 70 °F (21 °C), clear
Team	1	2	3	4	5	6	7	8	9	R	H	E
Atlanta	0	0	1	0	0	2	0	1	1	5	12	1
Colorado	0	0	0	3	0	0	0	1	0	4	13	4
WP: Alejandro Peña (1–0) LP: Curt Leskanic (0–1) Sv: Mark Wohlers (1); Home runs: ATL: Marquis Grissom (1), Chipper Jones 2 (2); COL: Vinny Castilla (1); Attendance: 50,040; Boxscore

Game 1 was a match-up between aces: Greg Maddux for the Atlanta Braves and Kevin Ritz for the Colorado Rockies. Ritz and Maddux worked their way out of minor trouble early on, but, in the top of the third, Marquis Grissom broke the scoreless tie with a shot to make it 1–0. However, the Rockies soon answered in the bottom of the fourth. After Maddux got Dante Bichette to ground out, he walked Larry Walker. Then a single by Andrés Galarraga moved Walker to third. Ellis Burks's sac fly brought Walker home. The next batter, Vinny Castilla, would hit a two-run homer to give Colorado its first lead of the night, but In the top of the sixth, Chipper Jones led off with a home run to make it a one-run game. David Justice then walked just before a single by Ryan Klesko. An error during the play by Burks moved Justice to third. Steve Reed relieved Ritz and Luis Polonia reached on a fielder's choice, bringing Justice home to tie the game. The Braves would load the bases, but Maddux struck out to end the inning. In the top of the eighth, Mike Munoz took the mound for Colorado. He got two quick outs, but surrendered a single to Klesko. Darren Holmes came in and gave up a single to Javy López. Dwight Smith followed with a pinch-hit RBI single to center to give the Braves a 4–3 lead. In the bottom of the inning, Bichette walked off Greg McMichael, then moved to third on a single by Walker and an error by Justice on the play. Galarraga would then reach on a fielder's choice (on a diving stop by Chipper Jones robbing the Big Cat of extra bases), with Walker out at second. Alejandro Peña came on to face Burks with one out. Burks doubled to tie the game at four apiece, but Pena got the next two outs. Curt Leskanic came on in the top of the ninth and got two outs, but gave up a home run to Chipper Jones. The Braves now had a 5–4 lead, but the Rockies tried to mount a rally in the bottom half off Mark Wohlers. With one out, Mike Kingery singled and was followed by another single by Bichette. Walker was then walked, loading the bases with only one out. That put the winning run in scoring position. Wohlers, however, was able to get Galarraga and pitcher Lance Painter (Rockies skipper Don Baylor had run out of position players in his first postseason game as manager) to strike out to end the game and give the Braves a well-earned victory.

=== Game 2 ===
October 4, 1995 6:07 pm (MDT) at Coors Field in Denver, Colorado 70 °F (21 °C), clear
Team	1	2	3	4	5	6	7	8	9	R	H	E
Atlanta	1	0	1	1	0	0	0	0	4	7	13	1
Colorado	0	0	0	0	0	3	0	1	0	4	8	2
WP: Alejandro Peña (2–0) LP: Mike Munoz (0–1) Sv: Mark Wohlers (2); Home runs: ATL: Marquis Grissom 2 (3); COL: Larry Walker (1); Attendance: 50,063; Boxscore

Game 2 matched Atlanta pitcher Tom Glavine against the man who made the final out in Game 1, Lance Painter. Marquis Grissom gave the Braves the lead with a lead off home run in the top of the first. Glavine then held the Rockies to one hit in the first two innings. In the top of the third, the Braves struck again when Mark Lemke singled and Chipper Jones had a bunt single. After Fred McGriff struck out, David Justice walked to load the bases with only one out. Javy López's sac fly made it 2–0, but the Braves could muster no more runs as Ryan Klesko struck out to end the inning. In the top of the fourth, Grissom again went deep with two outs to make it 3–0 Braves. All was silent until the bottom of the sixth. With one man out, Ellis Burks reached on an error by Jeff Blauser. Dante Bichette then singled to center to put runners on the corners. Then, Larry Walker hit a mammoth three-run home run to tie the game at three. In the bottom of the eighth, the Rockies took the lead when Andrés Galarraga drove home Bichette with a double off Alejandro Pena after Bichette had reached with a double of his own off Steve Avery. The Rockies were now three outs away from tying the series at one game apiece, but the Braves would not give in. Jones doubled to left to lead off the top of the ninth off Curt Leskanic, then came home on a single by McGriff off Mike Munoz to tie the game. With two outs now, Mike Devereaux singled off Darren Holmes, then Mike Mordecai followed with another single that drove home McGriff to give the Braves the lead. An errant throw to first by Eric Young, his second error of the game, allowed two more runs to score to give the Braves a 7–4 lead. Mark Wohlers saved the game in the bottom half to give the Braves a two-games-to-none lead going home.

=== Game 3 ===
October 6, 1995 8:09 pm (EDT) at Atlanta–Fulton County Stadium in Atlanta, Georgia 79 °F (26 °C), clear
Team	1	2	3	4	5	6	7	8	9	10	R	H	E
Colorado	1	0	2	0	0	2	0	0	0	2	7	9	0
Atlanta	0	0	0	3	0	0	1	0	1	0	5	11	0
WP: Darren Holmes (1–0) LP: Mark Wohlers (0–1) Sv: Mark Thompson (1); Home runs: COL: Eric Young (1), Vinny Castilla (2); ATL: None; Attendance: 51,300; Boxscore

The potential clincher pitted Bill Swift against John Smoltz. A wild pitch by Smoltz allowed Eric Young, who walked and moved to third on a sacrifice bunt, to score to make it 1–0 Rockies. Then Young made it 3–0 when he homered with one man on in the third. But the Braves put together three runs in the fourth thanks to an RBI double by Ryan Klesko after a single and walk followed by a two-run single by Javy López. During the final play of the inning, Jeff Blauser struck out and sprained his ankle in doing so, putting him on the bench for the rest of the postseason. The Rockies quickly responded with a two-run homer by Vinny Castilla in the sixth. But the Braves would chip away at the score in the seventh when Mike Mordecai doubled home Klesko, who singled to lead off Bill Swift, off Mike Munoz. Then in the ninth, the Braves would tie the game thanks to a two-out, pinch hit RBI single by Luis Polonia off Darren Holmes, the run charged to Bruce Ruffin. With Mark Wohlers on the mound in the tenth, after a two-out double and intentional walk, the Rockies would put together back-to-back RBI singles by Andres Galarraga and Castilla to make it 7–5. Mark Thompson retired the Braves in order in the bottom half to give the Rockies their first ever postseason win.

=== Game 4 ===
October 7, 1995 7:09 pm (EDT) at Atlanta–Fulton County Stadium in Atlanta, Georgia 70 °F (21 °C), clear
Team	1	2	3	4	5	6	7	8	9	R	H	E
Colorado	0	0	3	0	0	1	0	0	0	4	11	1
Atlanta	0	0	4	2	1	3	0	0	X	10	15	0
WP: Greg Maddux (1–0) LP: Bret Saberhagen (0–1); Home runs: COL: Dante Bichette (1), Vinny Castilla (3); ATL: Fred McGriff 2 (2); Attendance: 50,027; Boxscore

Greg Maddux was matched against Bret Saberhagen, who was hoping to keep Colorado's momentum intact. The game was scoreless into the third when Dante Bichette launched a three-run homer with one out after back-to-back singles in the top of the third. But the Braves responded in the bottom of the inning. After back-to-back two-out singles, Chipper Jones's two-run double cut the Rockies' lead to one before Fred McGriff's home run put the Braves up 4–3. Next inning, after a single and walk, Eric Young's errant throw to first, his third error in the series, on Rafael Belliard's fielder's choice allowed Ryan Klesko to score from, then Marquis Grissom's RBI double made it 6–3. McGriff's second home run of the game in the fifth off Kevin Ritz made it 7–3. The Rockies got that run back in the sixth on Vinny Castilla's home run, but in the bottom of the inning, Mark Lemke followed back-to-back two-out singles with an RBI double. After an intentional walk loaded the bases, Mike Munoz relieved Ritz and allowed a two-run single to McGriff. Alejandro Pena pitched two scoreless innings of relief as the Braves would advance to the NLCS with a 10–4 win.

=== Composite box ===
1995 NLDS (3–1): Atlanta Braves over Colorado Rockies

Team	1	2	3	4	5	6	7	8	9	10	R	H	E
Atlanta Braves	1	0	6	6	1	5	1	1	6	0	27	51	2
Colorado Rockies	1	0	5	3	0	6	0	2	0	2	19	41	7
Total attendance: 201,430 Average attendance: 50,358
