= 1995 San Diego Padres season =

1995 San Diego Padres
- League: National League
- Division: West
- Ballpark: Jack Murphy Stadium
- City: San Diego, California
- Record: 70–74 (.486)
- Divisional place: 3rd
- Owners: Tom Werner
- General managers: Randy Smith
- Managers: Bruce Bochy
- Television: KFMB-TV; KTTY; Prime Sports West (Jerry Coleman, Ted Leitner, Bob Chandler, Ken Levine)
- Radio: KFMB (AM) (Jerry Coleman, Ted Leitner, Bob Chandler, Ken Levine)

The 1995 San Diego Padres season was the 27th season in franchise history.

== Offseason ==
- November 3, 1994: Rico Rossy was signed as a free agent by the Padres.
- November 28, 1994: Wally Whitehurst was released by the Padres.
- December 28, 1994: Derek Bell, Doug Brocail, Ricky Gutiérrez, Pedro Martínez, Phil Plantier, and Craig Shipley were traded by the Padres to the Houston Astros for Ken Caminiti, Andújar Cedeño, Steve Finley, Roberto Petagine, and Brian Williams and a player to be named later. The Astros completed the deal by sending Sean Fesh (minors) to the Padres on May 1, 1995.

== Regular season ==
=== Opening Day starters ===
- Brad Ausmus
- Andy Benes
- Ken Caminiti
- Andújar Cedeño
- Steve Finley
- Tony Gwynn
- Jody Reed
- Bip Roberts
- Eddie Williams

=== Season standings ===
NL West
Team	W	L	Pct.	GB	Home	Road
Los Angeles Dodgers	78	66	.542	—	39‍–‍33	39‍–‍33
Colorado Rockies	77	67	.535	1	44‍–‍28	33‍–‍39
San Diego Padres	70	74	.486	8	40‍–‍32	30‍–‍42
San Francisco Giants	67	77	.465	11	37‍–‍35	30‍–‍42

=== Record vs. opponents ===
1995 National League record Source: MLB Standings Grid – 1995
Team	ATL	CHC	CIN	COL	FLA	HOU	LAD	MON	NYM	PHI	PIT	SD	SF	STL
Atlanta	—	8–4	8–5	9–4	10–3	6–6	5–4	9–4	5–8	7–6	4–2	5–2	7–1	7–5
Chicago	4–8	—	3–7	6–7	8–4	5–8	7–5	3–5	4–3	6–1	8–5	5–7	5–7	9–4
Cincinnati	5–8	7–3	—	5–7	6–6	12–1	4–3	8–4	7–5	9–3	8–5	3–6	3–3	8–5
Colorado	4–9	7–6	7–5	—	5–7	4–4	4–9	7–1	5–4	4–2	8–4	9–4	8–5	5–7
Florida	3–10	4–8	6–6	7–5	—	8–4	3–7	6–7	7–6	6–7	5–8	3–2	5–3	4–3
Houston	6–6	8–5	1–12	4–4	4–8	—	3–2	9–3	6–6	5–7	9–4	7–4	5–3	9–4
Los Angeles	4–5	5–7	3–4	9–4	7–3	2–3	—	7–5	6–6	4–9	9–4	7–6	8–5	7–5
Montreal	4–9	5–3	4–8	1–7	7–6	3–9	5–7	—	7–6	8–5	4–4	7–5	7–6	4–3
New York	8–5	3–4	5–7	4–5	6–7	6–6	6–6	6–7	—	7–6	4–3	6–7	5–8	3–4
Philadelphia	6-7	1–6	3–9	2–4	7–6	7–5	9–4	5–8	6–7	—	6–3	6–6	6–6	5–4
Pittsburgh	2–4	5–8	5–8	4–8	8–5	4–9	4–9	4–4	3–4	3–6	—	4–8	6–6	6–7
San Diego	2–5	7–5	6–3	4–9	2–3	4–7	6–7	5–7	7–6	6–6	8–4	—	6–7	7–5
San Francisco	1–7	7–5	3–3	5–8	3–5	3–5	5–8	6–7	8–5	6–6	6–6	7–6	—	7–6
St. Louis	5–7	4–9	5–8	7–5	3–4	4-9	5–7	3–4	4–3	4–5	7–6	5–7	6–7	—

=== Notable transactions ===
- April 5, 1995: Fernando Valenzuela was signed as a free agent by the Padres.
- May 31, 1995: Wascar Serrano was signed by the San Diego Padres as an amateur free agent.
- June 30, 1995: Greg Cadaret was signed as a free agent by the Padres.
- July 19, 1995: Rich Loiselle and Jeff Tabaka was traded by the Padres to the Houston Astros for Phil Plantier.
- July 31, 1995: Andy Benes and a player to be named later were traded by the Padres to the Seattle Mariners for Marc Newfield and Ron Villone. The Padres completed the deal by sending Greg Keagle to the Mariners on September 17.

=== Roster ===
1995 San Diego Padres
Roster
Pitchers: 43 Andy Ashby; 40 Andy Benes; 55 Andrés Berumen; 47 Willie Blair; 45 Doug Bochtler; 33 Glenn Dishman; 38 Donnie Elliott; 39 Bryce Florie; 50 Joey Hamilton; 48 Dustin Hermanson; 51 Trevor Hoffman; 54 Marc Kroon; 33,48 Bill Krueger; 52 Tim Mauser; 27 Scott Sanders; 46 Jeff Tabaka; 34 Fernando Valenzuela; 49 Ron Villone; 26 Brian Williams; 36 Tim Worrell	Catchers: 11 Brad Ausmus; 25 Brian Johnson; Infielders: 21 Ken Caminiti; 4 Andújar Cedeño; 29 Archi Cianfrocco; 18 Ray Holbert; 17 Tim Hyers; 8,9 Scott Livingstone; 24 Roberto Petagine; 2 Jody Reed; 10 Bip Roberts; 23 Eddie Williams	Outfielders: 31 Billy Bean; 30 Phil Clark; 12 Steve Finley; 19 Tony Gwynn; 20 Ray McDavid; 14 Marc Newfield; 3 Melvin Nieves; 7 Phil Plantier; 10 Bip Roberts	Manager: 15 Bruce Bochy; Coaches: 14 Davey Lopes (first base); 8 Graig Nettles (third base); 5 Rob Picciolo (bench); 16 Merv Rettenmund (hitting); 34 Sonny Siebert (pitching); ? Tye Waller (bullpen)

== Player stats ==
= Indicates team leader

= Indicates league leader

=== Batting ===
==== Starters by position ====
Note: Pos = Position; G = Games played; AB = At bats; H = Hits; Avg. = Batting average; HR = Home runs; RBI = Runs batted in

Pos	Player	G	AB	H	Avg.	HR	RBI
C	Brad Ausmus	103	328	96	.293	5	34
1B	Eddie Williams	97	296	77	.260	12	47
2B	Jody Reed	131	445	114	.256	4	40
SS	Andújar Cedeño	120	390	82	.210	6	31
3B	Ken Caminiti	143	526	159	.302	26	94
LF	Melvin Nieves	98	234	48	.205	14	38
CF	Steve Finley	139	562	167	.297	10	44
RF	Tony Gwynn	135	535	197	.368	9	90

==== Other batters ====
Note: G = Games played; AB = At bats; H = Hits; Avg. = Batting average; HR = Home runs; RBI = Runs batted in

Player	G	AB	H	Avg.	HR	RBI
Bip Roberts	73	296	90	.304	2	25
Brian Johnson	68	207	52	.251	3	29
Scott Livingstone	99	196	66	.337	5	32
Phil Plantier	54	148	38	.257	5	19
Roberto Petagine	89	124	29	.234	3	17
Archi Cianfrocco	51	118	31	.263	5	31
Phil Clark	75	97	21	.216	2	7
Ray Holbert	63	73	13	.178	2	5
Marc Newfield	21	55	17	.309	1	7
Ray McDavid	11	17	3	.176	0	0
Billy Bean	4	7	0	.000	0	0
Tim Hyers	6	5	0	.000	0	0

=== Pitching ===
==== Starting pitchers ====
Note: G = Games pitched; IP = Innings pitched; W = Wins; L = Losses; ERA = Earned run average; SO = Strikeouts

Player	G	IP	W	L	ERA	SO
Joey Hamilton	31	204.1	6	9	3.08	123
Andy Ashby	31	192.2	12	10	2.94	150
Andy Benes	19	118.2	4	7	4.17	126
Glenn Dishman	19	97.0	4	8	5.01	43
Scott Sanders	17	90.0	5	5	4.30	88

==== Other pitchers ====
Note: G = Games pitched; IP = Innings pitched; W = Wins; L = Losses; ERA = Earned run average; SO = Strikeouts

Player	G	IP	W	L	ERA	SO
Willie Blair	40	114.0	7	5	4.34	83
Fernando Valenzuela	29	90.1	8	3	4.98	57

==== Relief pitchers ====
Note: G = Games pitched; W = Wins; L = Losses; SV = Saves; ERA = Earned run average; SO = Strikeouts

Player	G	W	L	SV	ERA	SO
Trevor Hoffman	55	7	4	31	3.88	52
Bryce Florie	47	2	2	1	3.01	68
Brian Williams	44	3	10	0	6.00	75
Andrés Berumen	37	2	3	1	5.68	42
Doug Bochtler	34	4	4	1	3.57	45
Dustin Hermanson	26	3	1	0	6.82	19
Ron Villone	19	2	1	1	4.21	37
Jeff Tabaka	10	0	0	0	7.11	6
Tim Worrell	9	1	0	0	4.73	13
Bill Krueger	6	0	0	0	7.04	6
Tim Mauser	5	0	1	0	9.53	9
Marc Kroon	2	0	1	0	10.80	2
Donnie Elliott	1	0	0	0	0.00	3

== Award winners ==
1995 Major League Baseball All-Star Game

- Tony Gwynn, outfield, starter

== Farm system ==
Level	Team	League	Manager
AAA	Las Vegas Stars	Pacific Coast League	Tim Flannery
AA	Memphis Chicks	Southern League	Jerry Royster
A	Rancho Cucamonga Quakes	California League	Marty Barrett
A	Clinton LumberKings	Midwest League	Ed Romero
Rookie	AZL Padres	Arizona League	Dan Norman
Rookie	Idaho Falls Braves	Pioneer League	Mike Basso
