= Coors Field =

Baseball stadium in Denver, Colorado

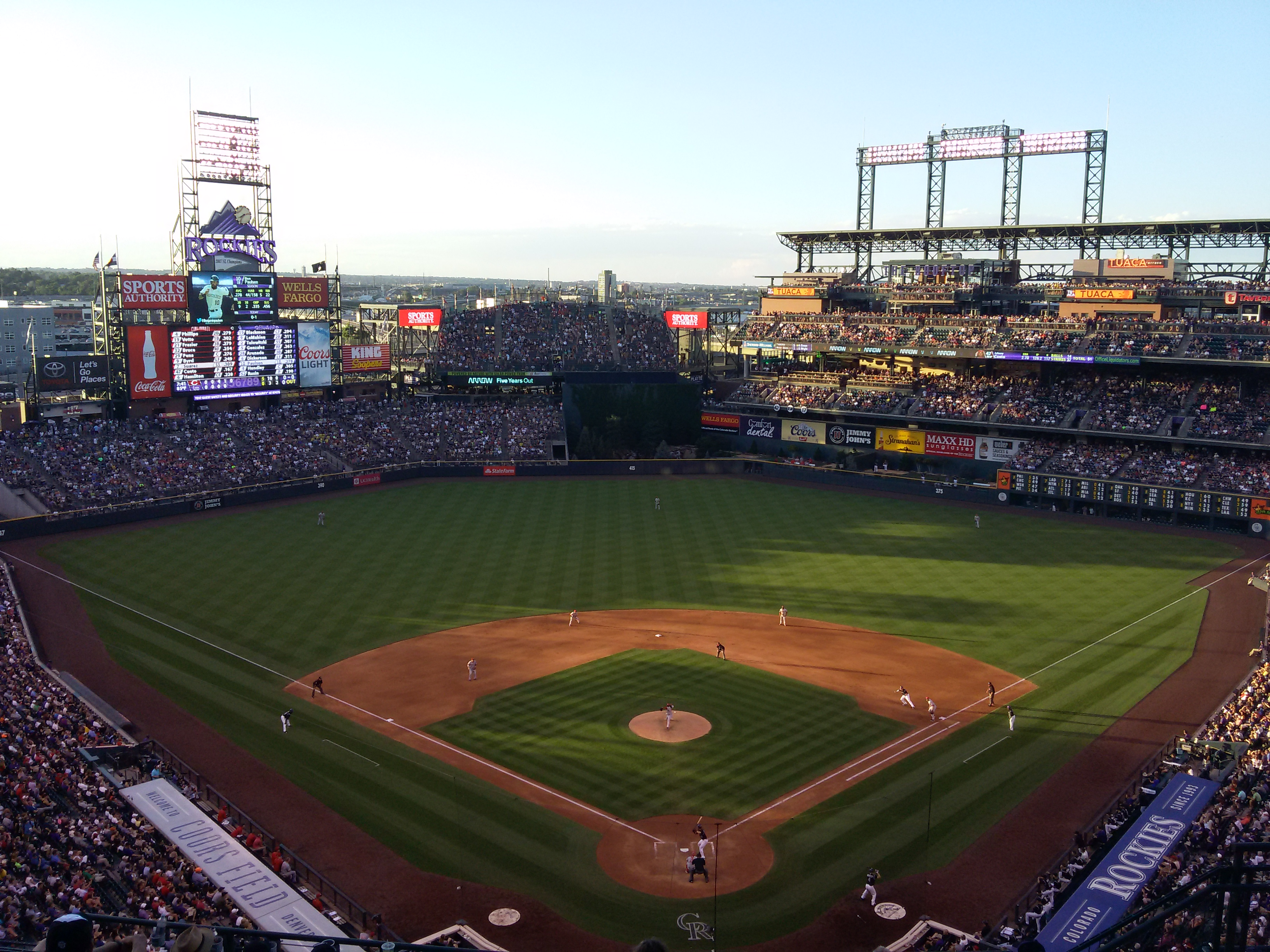
- Coors Field in 2015

- Location in Colorado Location in the United States Location in North America
- Interactive map of Coors Field
- Address: 2001 Blake Street
- Location: Denver, Colorado, U.S.
- Coordinates: 39°45′22″N 104°59′39″W
- Operator: Colorado Rockies Baseball Club Ltd.
- Capacity: 50,200 (1995–1998); 50,381 (1999–2000); 50,445 (2001–2010); 50,490 (2011); 50,398 (2012–2017); 46,897 (50,144 with standing room) (2018–present)
- Surface: Kentucky Bluegrass/Perennial Ryegrass
- Record attendance: 51,267 (1998 MLB All-Star Game)
- Field size: Left Field – 347 feet (106 m); Left-Center – 390 feet (119 m); Center Field – 415 feet (126 m); Right-Center – 375 feet (114 m); Right Field – 350 feet (107 m); Backstop – 56 feet (17 m)
- Public transit: RTD: at Union Station

Construction
- Groundbreaking: October 16, 1992; 34 years ago
- Opened: April 26, 1995; 31 years ago
- Cost: US$300 million ($634 million in 2025 dollars)
- Architect: HOK Sport (now Populous)
- Project managers: CMTS, Inc.
- Structural engineers: Martin/Martin, Inc.
- Services engineers: M-E Engineers, Inc.
- General contractor: Mortenson/Barton Malow
- Main contractors: LPR Construction; Havens Steel; Zimmerman Metals; Zimkor Industries; LPR Erectors

Tenant
- Colorado Rockies (MLB) (1995–present)

Website
- mlb.com/rockies/ballpark

Coors Field is a baseball stadium in downtown Denver, Colorado, United States. It is the ballpark of Major League Baseball's Colorado Rockies. Opened in 1995, the park is located in Denver's Lower Downtown neighborhood, two blocks from Union Station. The stadium has a capacity of 50,144 people for baseball.

As an expansion team that began play in 1993, the Rockies spent their first two seasons at Mile High Stadium. During that time, Coors Field was constructed for a cost of $300 million. It includes 63 luxury suites and 4,526 club seats. Coors Field has earned a reputation as a hitter's park, due to the effect of Denver's high elevation and semi-arid climate on the distances of batted balls. To counter this, the outfield fences have been moved away from home plate and baseballs used in the park are stored in a humidor.

Coors Field has hosted the 1998 MLB All-Star Game and the 2021 MLB All-Star Game. Coors has also hosted an outdoor hockey game from the 2016 NHL Stadium Series along with numerous concerts.

In 2017, a consultant determined that Coors Field would require $200 million in capital improvements in the 2020s. To fund those improvements, the Rockies agreed to a long-term lease to develop club-owned nearby land.

== Construction ==
Coors Field was the first new stadium added in a six-year period in which Denver's sports venues were upgraded, along with Ball Arena (originally Pepsi Center) and Empower Field at Mile High (originally Invesco Field). It was also the first baseball-only park in the National League since Dodger Stadium was built in 1962.

As with the other new venues, Coors Field was constructed with transportation access in mind. It sits near Interstate 25 and has direct access to the 20th Street and Park Avenue exits. Nearby Union Station also provides light rail and commuter rail access, as well as local and regional bus lines.

Coors Field was originally planned to be somewhat smaller, seating only 43,800. However, after the Rockies drew almost 4.5 million people in their first season at Mile High Stadium – the most in baseball history – the plans were altered during construction, and new seats in the right field upper deck were added.

The center field bleacher section is named "The Rockpile". During the 1993 and 1994 seasons when the team played at Mile High Stadium, which was a hybrid football/baseball venue, the Rockpile was located next to the south stands, which were in dead center field and very distant from home plate. The same design was incorporated into Coors Field, and is located in deep center field up high. The original Rockpile seats cost a dollar each.

During construction, workers discovered a number of dinosaur fossils throughout the grounds. Rumors circulated that these fossils included a 7-foot-long (2.1 m) 1,000-pound (450 kg) triceratops skull. In reality, the fossil fragments discovered were quite small, and are now housed at the Denver Museum of Nature and Science. Because of these discoveries, "Jurassic Park" was one of the first names to be considered for the stadium. This later led to the selection of a triceratops as the Rockies' mascot, Dinger.

In 1991, Coors Brewing purchased naming rights "in perpetuity" to the stadium as part of their $30 million investment in the Rockies. A 2017 lease agreement that Rockies club ownership signed with the stadium district ensured that the name would remain at least through 2047.

== Features ==
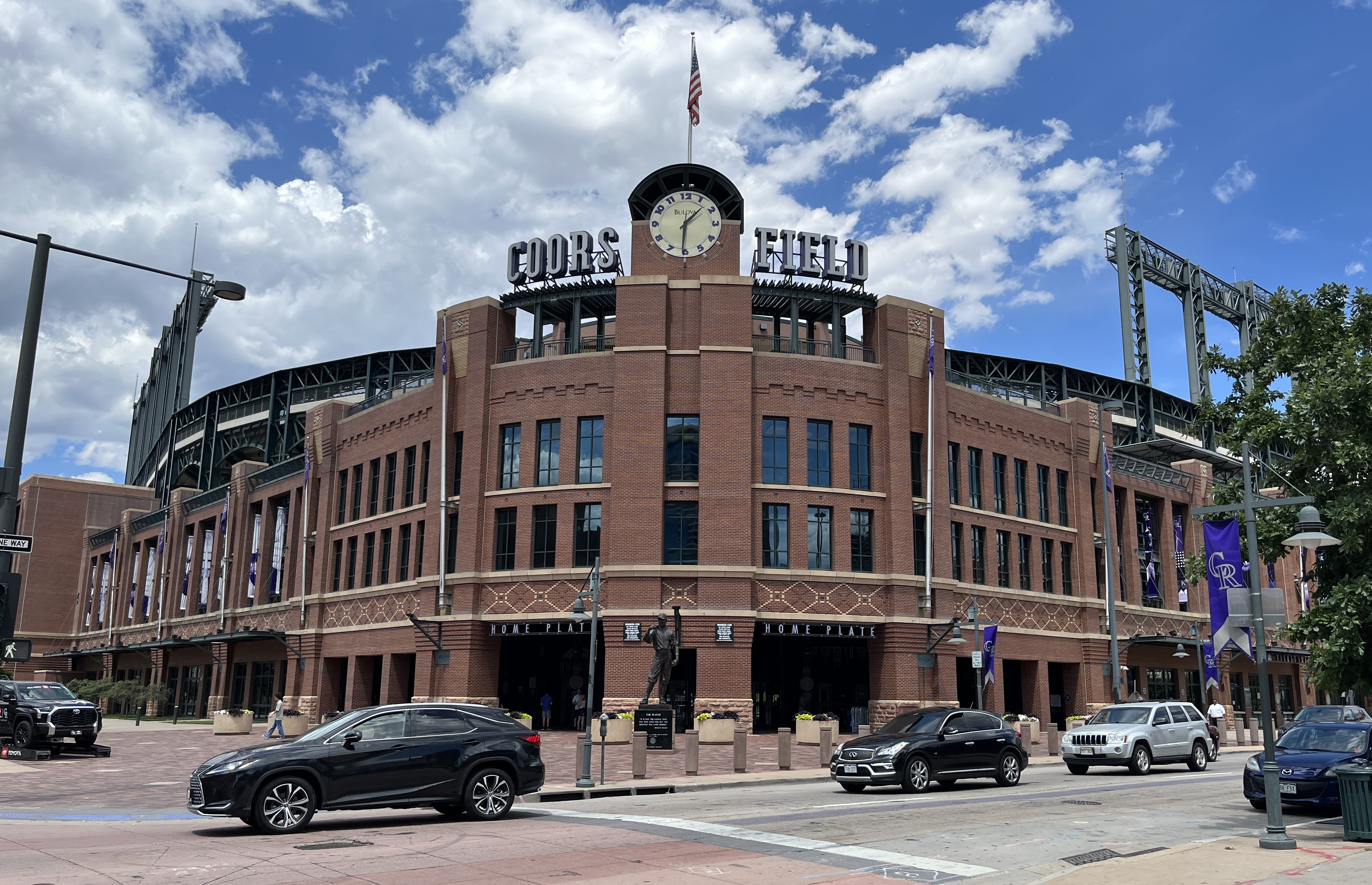
Main entrance to the ballpark

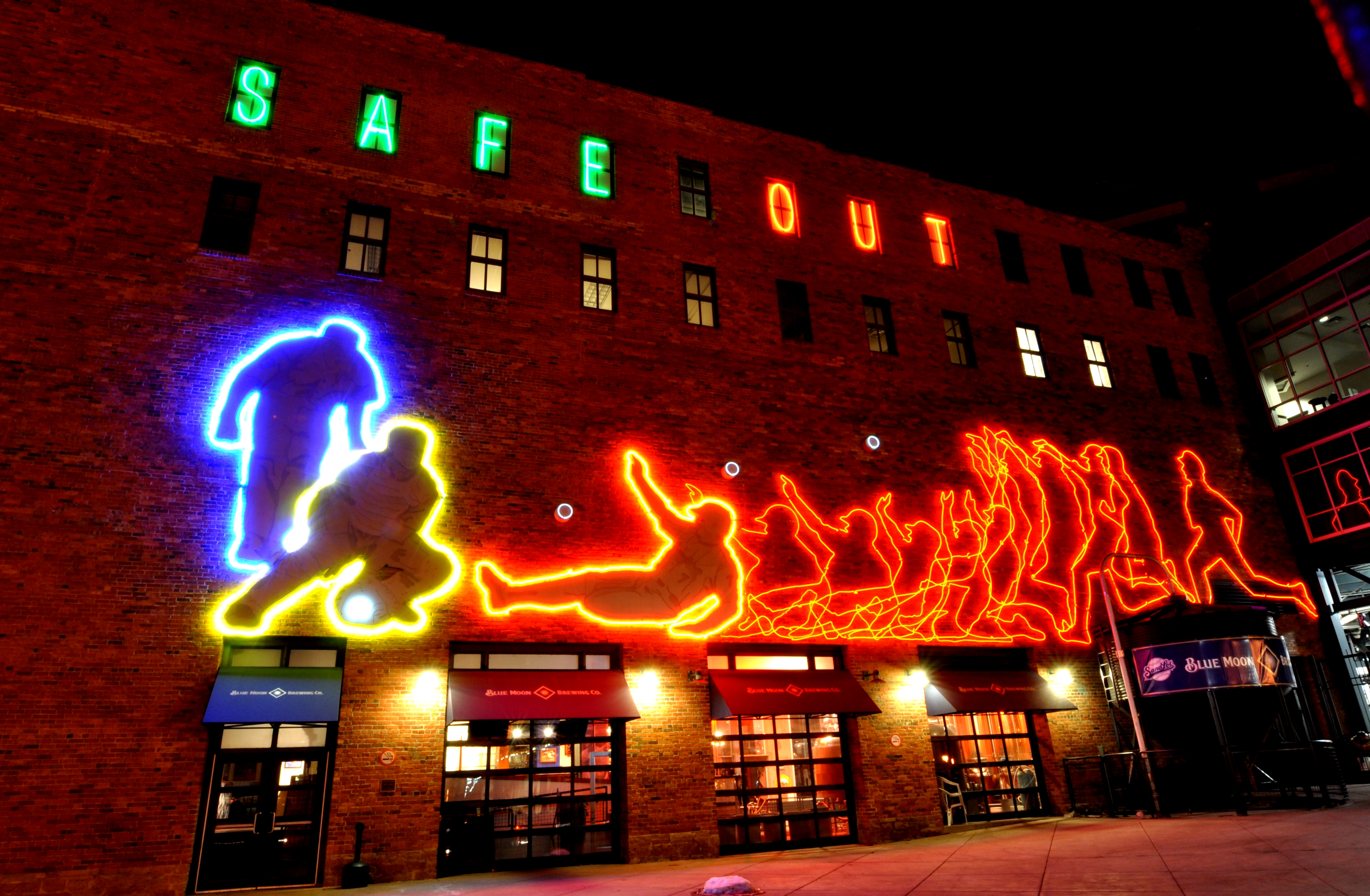
Extended exposure of neon lights on the northeast corner above the Blue Moon Brewery

While most of the seats in Coors Field are dark green, the seats in the 20th row of the upper deck are purple to mark the elevation of one mile (5280 ft; 1,609 m) above sea level.

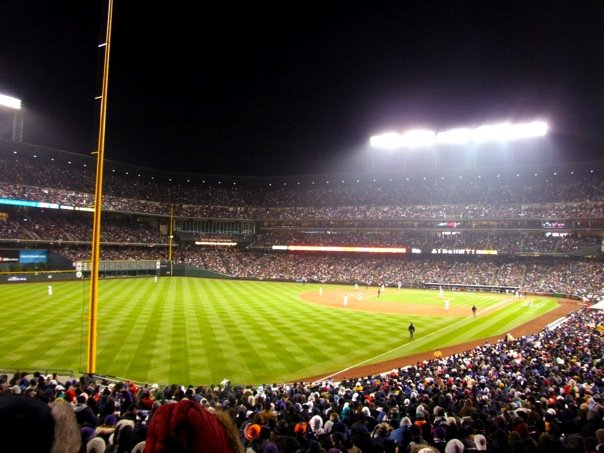
Coors Field sold out at night

The Blue Moon Brewery at The Sandlot is a microbrewery/restaurant that is behind the right-field stands, with an entrance from Coors Field, and from Blake Street. The brewery is operated by the Coors Brewing Company, and experiments with craft beers on a small scale. The Brewery has won multiple awards at the Great American Beer Festival in various categories. The popular Blue Moon, a Belgian-Style Wheat beer was invented here, and is now mass-produced by Coors. The restaurant is housed in a building that is attached to the stadium. Coors Field has an extensive selection of food items. Selections include Rockie dogs, Denver dogs, vegetarian dogs and burgers, and all of the usual ball park items.

Behind the center field wall is a landscape decoration that reflects the typical environment of the Rocky Mountains. This landscape area consists of a waterfall, fountains, and pine trees. After a Rockies home run or win, the fountains shoot high into the air.

The park has two large light emitting diode (LED) video displays and one ribbon display in the outfield from Daktronics. The top display, underneath the "Rockies" logo, measures 27 by 47 feet (8 m × 14 m). The second display measure 33 by 73 feet (10 m × 22 m) and is used to give lineups and statistics and as a scoreboard. The field also contains several Daktronics ribbon displays, totaling approximately 833 feet (254 m) in length.

Within ten hours of the close of the 2013 Rockies season, renovations began on the right field portion of the upper deck to construct an outdoor party deck called The Rooftop which would open only four months later for opening day 2014. At the time it was the largest party deck in all of professional sports, measuring 46,000 square feet. Construction cost 10 million dollars, removed about 3,500 seats and added two new levels of standing room only bar area. The Rooftop is open to anyone who has purchased a ticket for that day's event.

Coors Field is also home to a section of seats called "The Rockpile". The very last section of seats are 600 feet away from home plate, making them the furthest away from home plate in any MLB stadium.

=== Reputation as a home run-friendly park ===
At 5,200 feet (1,580 m) above sea level, Coors Field is by far the highest park in the majors. The next-highest, Chase Field in Phoenix, stands at 1,100 feet (340 m). Designers knew that the stadium would give up a lot of home runs, as the lower air density at such a high elevation would result in balls traveling farther than in other parks. To compensate for this, the outfield fences were placed at an unusually far distance from home plate, thus creating the largest outfield in Major League Baseball. In spite of the pushed-back fences, for many years Coors Field not only gave up the most home runs in baseball, but due to the resultant large field area, the most doubles and triples as well.

In its first decade, the above-average number of home runs earned Coors Field a reputation as the most hitter-friendly park in Major League Baseball, earning the critical nicknames "Coors Canaveral" (a reference to Cape Canaveral, from where NASA launches spacecraft) and "Williamsport" (referring to the site of the Little League World Series, which has been traditionally dominated by batters). Prior to the 2002 baseball season, studies determined that dry air rather than thin air had a greater contribution to the increased frequency of home runs. It was found that baseballs stored in damper air are softer and therefore less elastic to the impact of the bat. To address this problem, a secure room-sized humidor was installed to have a damper place to store the baseballs prior to games. Since its introduction, the number of home runs at Coors Field has decreased and is now nearly the same as other parks.

Regardless of ball humidity, elevation is still a factor in games at Coors Field. The ball does slip more easily through the thin air allowing for longer hits. In addition, the curveball tends to curve less with the thin air than at sea level leading to fewer strikeouts and fewer effective pitches for pitchers to work with.

Coors Field twice broke the major league record for home runs hit in a ballpark in one season. The previous record, 248, had been set at the Angels' original home of Wrigley Field in Los Angeles in 1961, its only year for major league ball. In Coors Field's first year, the home run total fell just 7 short of that mark, despite losing 9 games from the home schedule (or 1/9 of the normal 81) due to the strike that had continued from 1994. The next season, 1996, with a full schedule finally, 271 home runs were hit at Coors Field. In 1999, the current major league record was set at 303. The annual home run figure dropped noticeably in 2002, and has dropped below 200 starting in 2005.

Although the number of home runs hit per season at Coors Field is decreasing, Coors Field still remains the most hitter friendly ballpark in the Major Leagues by a wide margin. From 2012 to 2015, the Colorado Rockies led the league in runs scored in home games, while being last in the league for runs scored in away games. This demonstrates the extreme benefit that Coors Field's low air density provides to hitters.

One concern for the Rockies has been poor adjustment when playing road games at lower altitudes. The Rockies score an average of just 3.9 runs per road game, the lowest among all teams. This has had a detrimental effect on Colorado's all-time road record, which sits at 888–1352, or 39.6%, the worst in the majors.

==== Increased fence height ====
In order to combat the concerns of a home run friendly ballpark and to attract free agent pitchers, the Rockies raised two portions of the outfield fences prior to the 2016 season. The sections of fence that were raised were specifically chosen to not interfere with the view of the field from the grandstand. From right field to center field in front of the bullpens the fence was raised 8 feet 9 inches to a height of 16 feet 6 inches, consistent with the height of the out of town scoreboard. In the left field corner the fence was raised five feet to a total height of thirteen feet from the foul pole to the pavilion seating section.

Analysis after the 2016 season showed that the new fences had very little effect. One study showed that the new fences only came into play twenty times; one play changed what would have been a ground rule double into a triple. The number of home runs in the 2016 season was actually greater than the 2015 season. The new fences had the most effect on right handed batters.

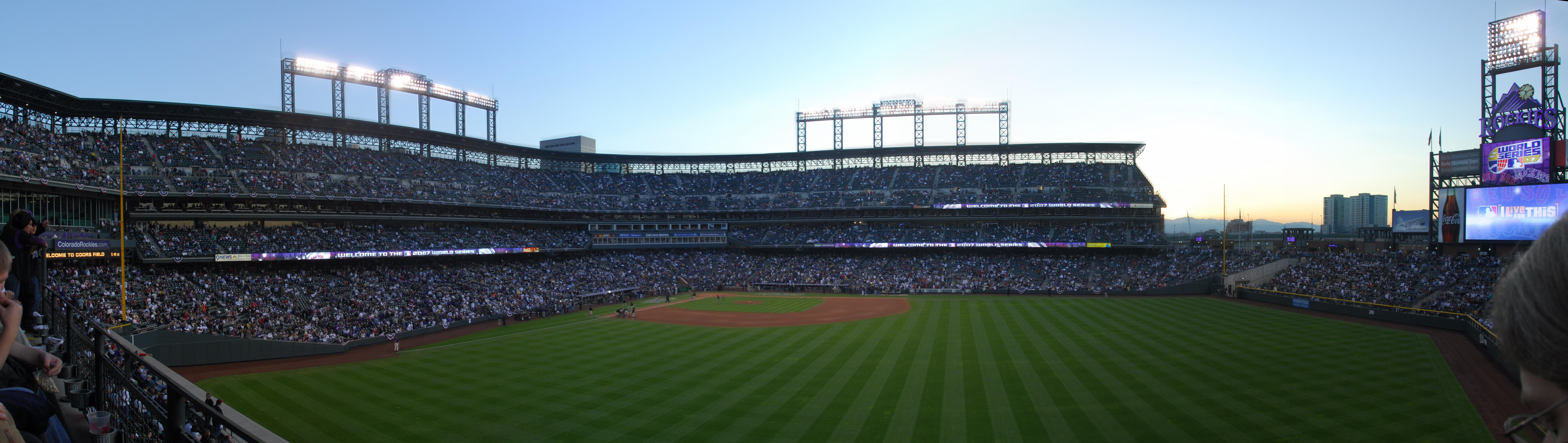
Panorama of Coors Field on the night of Game 4 of the 2007 World Series

== Notable events ==
=== MLB ===
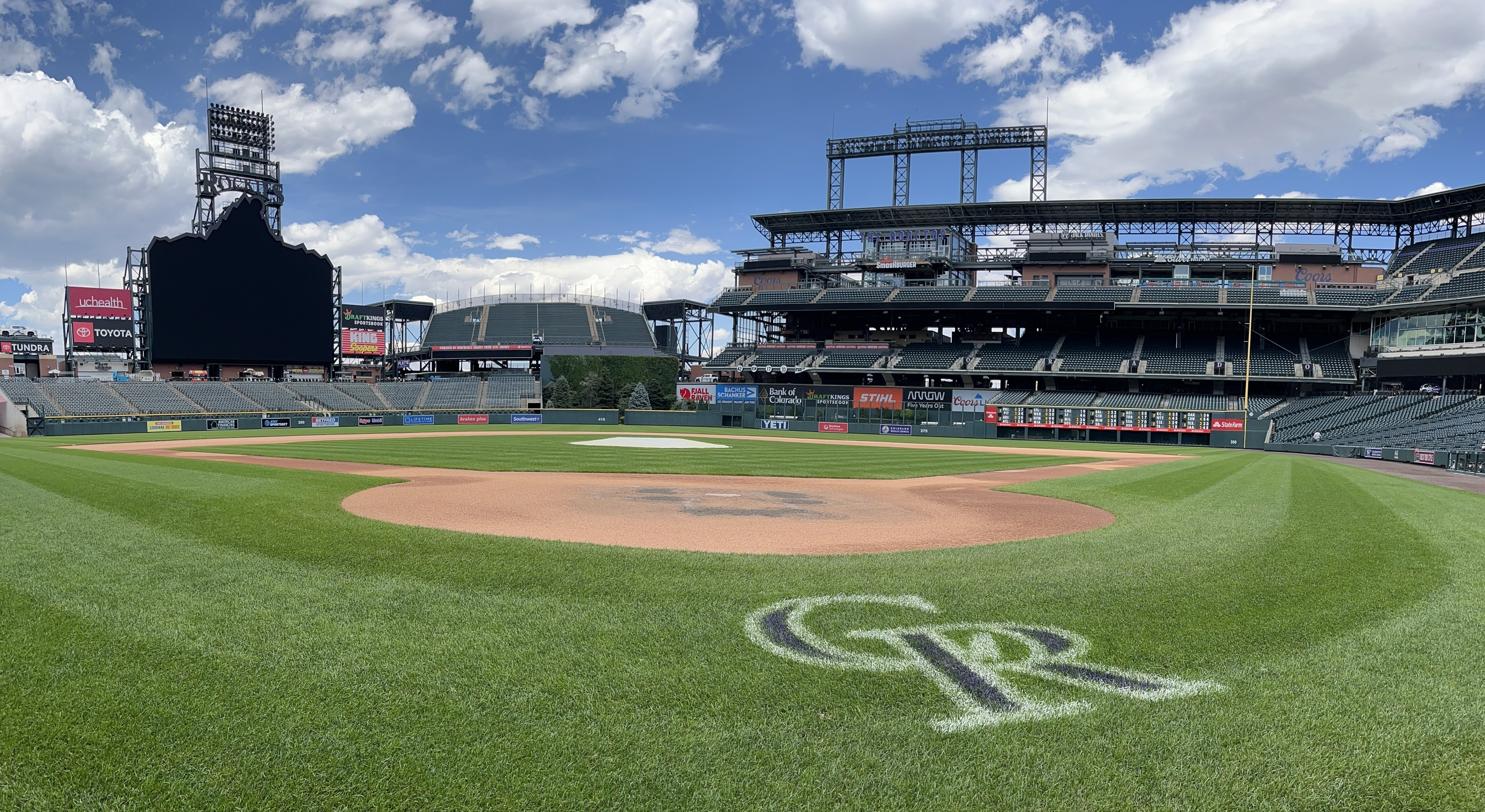
Behind home plate at Coors Field in 2022

On September 17, 1996, Hideo Nomo of the Los Angeles Dodgers threw the first of his two career no-hitters as the Dodgers won 9–0. Nomo's remains the only no-hitter ever thrown at Coors Field through the end of the 2025 season.

The 1998 and 2021 Major League Baseball All-Star Games took place in Coors Field.

In 2011, a man fell to his death when he was attempting to slide down a stair railing during the 7th inning of a Rockies–Diamondbacks game.

On April 23, 2013, Rockies and Braves played in the coldest game since MLB began tracking game time temperature in 1991, at 23 °F (−5 °C).

There have been twelve 1–0 games in Coors Field history, through April 21, 2026. The first 1–0 game at Coors Field was on July 9, 2005, meaning all twelve games have occurred since Major League Baseball allowed the Rockies to start using a humidor on May 15, 2002:

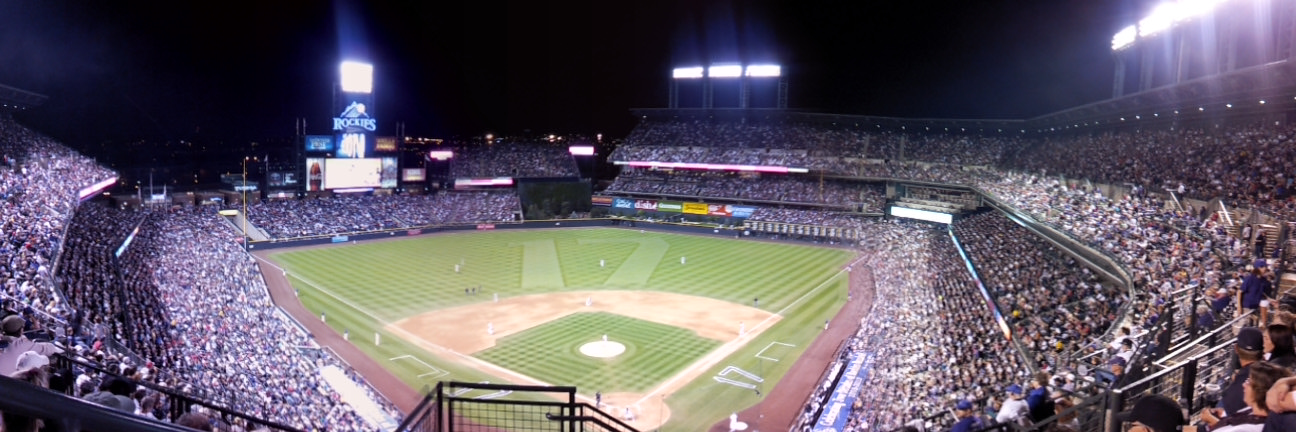
Panorama of Coors Field during Todd Helton's final home game. This was also the final game played at the stadium before the removal of part of the right field upper deck.

- July 9, 2005, Rockies beat the San Diego Padres
- April 16, 2006, Philadelphia Phillies beat the Rockies
- July 25, 2006, St. Louis Cardinals beat the Rockies
- August 1, 2006, Milwaukee Brewers beat the Rockies
- June 11, 2008, Rockies beat the San Francisco Giants
- September 14, 2008, Rockies beat the Los Angeles Dodgers in 10 innings
- September 17, 2008, Rockies beat the San Diego Padres
- July 6, 2009, Rockies beat the Washington Nationals
- June 12, 2010, Rockies beat the Toronto Blue Jays
- July 4, 2018, Rockies beat the San Francisco Giants
- April 6, 2023, Rockies beat the Washington Nationals
- April 21, 2026, San Diego Padres beat the Rockies.

Games 3 and 4 of the 2007 World Series between the Rockies and the Boston Red Sox were held at Coors Field. The Red Sox swept both games to win the title.

On August 7, 2016, Ichiro Suzuki collected his 3,000th MLB career hit: a seventh-inning triple that was off the right field wall off Rockies pitcher Chris Rusin.

=== Concerts ===
Date	Artist	Opening act(s)	Tour / Concert name	Attendance	Revenue	Notes
July 3, 2015	Zac Brown Band	Big Head Todd & The Monsters	Jekyll and Hyde Tour	38,703 / 38,703	$2,565,497	The first major concert at the ballpark
July 29, 2017	Zac Brown Band	Darrell Brown; Madison Ryann Ward	Welcome Home Tour	39,882 / 43,897	$2,868,048	
June 28, 2018	Eagles; Jimmy Buffett	—N/a	An Evening with the Eagles 2018	—	—	
July 21, 2018	Def Leppard; Journey	The Pretenders	Def Leppard & Journey 2018 Tour	44,928 / 44,928	$3,820,813	
August 8, 2019	Billy Joel	—N/a	Billy Joel in Concert	44,744 / 44,744	$5,684,083	
August 9, 2019	Zac Brown Band	Lukas Nelson & Promise of the Real	The Owl Tour			
July 21, 2022	Def Leppard; Mötley Crüe	Poison; Joan Jett & the Blackhearts; Tuk Smith & The Restless Hearts	The Stadium Tour	42,737 / 42,737	$6,181,056	
July 22, 2022	The Lumineers	Gregory Alan Isakov; Daniel Rodriguez	Brightside World Tour	TBA	TBA	
July 12, 2024	Billy Joel			Around 54,000		
September 6, 2024	Kane Brown	Bailey Zimmerman; LoCash; RaeLynn	In the Air Tour			
September 7, 2024	Green Day	The Smashing Pumpkins; Rancid; The Linda Lindas	The Saviors Tour			
September 8, 2024	Def Leppard; Journey	Cheap Trick	The Summer Stadium Tour			
September 24, 2025	Chris Brown	Jhené Aiko; Bryson Tiller	Breezy Bowl XX Tour			
October 11, 2025	Paul McCartney		Got Back			
August 8, 2026	Noah Kahan		The Great Divide Tour	101,181 / 101,181	$17,172,614	
August 9, 2026	Noah Kahan		The Great Divide Tour	101,181 / 101,181	$17,172,614	
August 27, 2026	My Chemical Romance					

=== Ice Hockey ===
Coors Field also hosted three outdoor ice hockey games in February 2016. First, on February 20, the local Denver Pioneers defeated their arch-rival Colorado College 4–1 in a college match billed as the "Battle on Blake". Then, one week later on February 27, the Colorado Avalanche lost to the Detroit Red Wings 5–3 as part of the 2016 NHL Stadium Series. The day before that also hosted the Alumni exhibition game where the Colorado Avalanche alumni defeated their Detroit Red Wings counterparts.

Date	Winning Team	Result	Losing Team	Event	Spectators
February 20, 2016	Denver Pioneers	4–1	Colorado College Tigers	Battle for the Gold Pan	35,144
February 26, 2016	Colorado Avalanche Alumni	5–2	Detroit Red Wings Alumni	NHL Alumni Game	43,319
February 27, 2016	Detroit Red Wings	5–3	Colorado Avalanche	2016 NHL Stadium Series	50,095

=== Banana Ball ===
As a part of their world tour, the Savannah Bananas played two games of Banana Ball against the Firefighters at Coors Field on August 9–10, 2025. Tickets were available via a lottery and sold out in less than two hours. The attendance of more than 50,000 fans was the highest of any MLB stadium in the Bananas history. The August 10 game showcased the Firefighters' first win at an MLB stadium in franchise history after almost two years of futility since the team's first game at an MLB stadium at Nationals Park in Washington, D.C. The August 9 game was televised by ESPN.

The Savannah Bananas will play two games against the Indianapolis Clowns at Coors Field on August 14–15, 2026. Tickets will again be available via a lottery.

== The "Voice" of Coors Field ==
Alan Roach was the main PA announcer since Coors Field opened in 1995. In the spring preceding the 2007 Rockies season, Roach announced his retirement from his post at Coors Field to spend more time over the summer with his family. He did come back to substitute in 2008. Roach is also the PA announcer for the nearby Colorado Avalanche hockey team of the NHL and former PA announcer for the Denver Broncos of the NFL. He also provides voice-overs for local sports introductions in the region, in addition to hosting a local sports talk radio show. He is currently the PA announcer for the Minnesota Vikings of the NFL. He is also one of the voices of the train system at Denver International Airport, and has also been heard as the PA announcer at recent Super Bowls. Reed Saunders, 23, was chosen to be the new voice of Coors Field on March 16, 2007.

== Coors Field firsts ==
=== Opening Day (April 26, 1995) ===
Statistic	Player(s)/Team
Score	Colorado 11, New York Mets 9; 14 innings
First National Anthem	Colorado Children's Chorale
First Pitch	5:38 p.m., Bill Swift to Brett Butler
First Plate Appearance, First At Bat, First Swing and First Hit	Brett Butler, infield single, 1st inning
First Batter to Ground Into Double Play	José Vizcaíno (Mets), turned 6–3, Walt Weiss to Andrés Galarraga
First Putout	Walt Weiss put out Brett Butler at second base (during the double play mentioned above)
First Extra-Base Hit and First Run Batted In	Larry Walker (Rockies) double in 1st inning
First Run	Walt Weiss (Rockies), 1st inning
First Flyout and First Sacrifice Fly	Dante Bichette (Rockies), putout by David Segui, scoring Joe Girardi, 1st inning
First Strikeout	Bill Swift, struck out (called) David Segui, 2nd inning
First Sacrifice Bunt	Bobby Jones (Mets), 3rd inning
First Home Run	Rico Brogna (Mets), 4th inning off Swift
First Base On Balls	Bobby Jones (Mets) walked Bill Swift, 5th inning
First Grand Slam	Todd Hundley (Mets), 6th inning off Swift
First Pinch Hitter	John Vander Wal announced for Swift (did not appear), Eric Young pinched for Vander Wal, 6th inning
First Relief Pitcher	Jerry Dipoto (Mets), 6th inning
First Batter to be Hit By Pitch	Roberto Mejía (Rockies) by Dipoto, 6th inning
First Right Field Outfield Assist	Carl Everett (Mets), Vinny Castilla at second base, 6th inning
First Wild Pitch	Mike Munoz (Rockies), facing Rico Brogna, 7th inning
First Blown Save	Mike Munoz (Rockies), 7th inning; the Mets John Franco and Mike Remlinger recorded the second and third blown saves in the 9th and 14th inning of the same inaugural game
First Pinch Runner	Brook Fordyce (Mets), 8th inning
First Foul Popfly	Andrés Galarraga (Rockies), fielded by Jeff Kent
First Left Field Outfield Assist	Dante Bichette (Rockies), José Vizcaíno at second base, 13th inning
Intentional Base On Balls	Todd Hundley (Mets), by pitcher Mark Thompson
First Pinch Base Hit	Jim Tatum (Rockies), 13th inning
First Error	Tim Bogar (Mets), 14th inning
First Walk-off home run (and First Rockies Home Run)	Dante Bichette (Rockies), three-run home run, 14th inning
First Win	Mark Thompson (Rockies)

=== Later firsts ===
Statistic	Person(s)	Date
First Stolen Base	Eric Young and Walt Weiss (Rockies) double steal	April 27, 1995
First Passed Ball	Joe Girardi (Rockies)	April 27, 1995
First Triple	Andrés Galarraga (Rockies)	April 27, 1995
First Baserunner Caught Stealing	Carl Everett (Mets), by A. J. Sager / Joe Girardi	April 27, 1995
First Save	Bruce Ruffin (Rockies)	May 3, 1995
First Back to Back Home Runs	Mike Kingery and Roberto Mejía (Rockies)	May 6, 1995
First Center Field Outfield Assist	Raúl Mondesí (Los Angeles Dodgers), Larry Walker at second base	May 6, 1995
First Baserunner Picked Off Caught Stealing	Dante Bichette (Rockies) at third base, by Terry Mulholland (San Francisco Giants)	May 11, 1995
First Baserunner Picked Off On Base	Brian Jordan (St. Louis Cardinals), by Mark Thompson at 1st base	June 6, 1995
First Balk	Marvin Freeman (Rockies)	June 7, 1995
First Complete Game and First Shutout	Tom Glavine (Atlanta Braves)	June 16, 1995
First Cycle	John Mabry (St. Louis Cardinals); 11th natural cycle in MLB history	May 18, 1996
First No-hitter	Hideo Nomo (Los Angeles Dodgers)	September 17, 1996
First Unassisted Triple Play	Troy Tulowitzki (Rockies)	April 29, 2007

== See also ==
- List of ballparks by capacity
- List of current Major League Baseball stadiums
- Lists of stadiums

== Notes ==
1. Being less elastic, a softer baseball experiences more deformation than a harder one, all else being equal – that is, it is less bouncy. Thus, at the time of bat-ball contact, more of the combined kinetic energy of the bat and ball is absorbed by deformation of the baseball, leaving less to impart motion to the ball in its flight away from the bat (which means that the softer baseball has a lower coefficient of restitution). But given the small change in elasticity of the balls stored in the humidor, the speed (and hardness) of the bat and the speed of the ball remain much stronger factors in the outcome of the impact event.

Events and tenants
Preceded by Mile High Stadium	Home of the Colorado Rockies; 1995–present	Succeeded by Current
Preceded by Jacobs Field	Host of the All-Star Game; 1998	Succeeded by Fenway Park
