= Amalio Carreño =

Venezuelan baseball player (born 1964)

- Pitcher
- Born: April 11, 1964 (age 62); Chacachacare, Venezuela
- Batted: Right Threw: Right

MLB debut
- July 7, 1991, for the Philadelphia Phillies

Last MLB appearance
- July 14, 1991, for the Philadelphia Phillies

MLB statistics
- Win–loss record: 0-0
- Earned run average: 16.20
- Strikeouts: 2
- Stats at Baseball Reference

Teams
- Philadelphia Phillies (1991)

Amalio Rafael Carreño Adrián [ah-mah'-leo / car-ray'-nyoh] (born April 11, 1964) is a Venezuelan former professional baseball right-handed relief pitcher, who played in Major League Baseball (MLB) for the 1991 Philadelphia Phillies. In his "cup of coffee" big league career, Carreño had a 0–0 record, with two strikeouts, and a 16.20 earned run average (ERA), in 3 1/3 innings pitched.

== Career ==
Carreño started his professional career with the New York Yankees, who signed him as an amateur free agent in 1983. He spent the 1984 season with the GCL Yankees, the minor league rookie affiliate of the Yankees. He pitched in nine games and started in seven of them, winning one game, losing six, and finishing with an ERA of 4.91. He pitched in one game the following season, and in 1986 split time between the GCL and Fort Lauderdale Yankees of the Florida State League. After seven games with GCL, going 5–0 with a 1.70 ERA, Carreño was promoted to Fort Lauderdale, where he pitched in three games, winning one and losing one.

In 1987, Carreño pitched for three teams in the Yankees organization: the Prince William Yankees, the Albany-Colonie Yankees, and the Columbus Clippers. He spent the first part of the season with Prince William, then was promoted to Columbus, where his outings included two shutout innings at the AAA level. After 11 appearances with Columbus, he was sent back to Prince William, pitching a complete game in his return appearance. He finished his time at Prince William with a 5–2 record and a 3.03 ERA. Late in the season, he was promoted to Albany-Colonie and spent the rest of the season there. In November, the Yankees purchased Carreño's contract and placed him on the 40-man roster.

At the start of the 1988 season, the Yankees signed Carreño to a one-year contract and invited him to spring training. After pitching with the Yankees in March, he was sent along with Clay Parker to Albany-Colonie. He was traded to the Philadelphia Phillies on July 15, 1988, for Luis Aguayo. Carreño finished the season with three wins, four losses, and a 4.07 ERA in 14 appearances. He remained with the Reading Phillies for the following two years. In 1989, he pitched in 31 games, starting 11, and had a 4.34 ERA and 5–7 record. He was invited to spring training for the Phillies, but was unable to do so after missing a flight out of Venezuela. He was sent to Reading after spring training ended, and moved into the starting rotation for them. On August 25, Carreño was on the losing side of a perfect game thrown by Kevin Morton, losing the game 1–0. He finished the season with a 4–13 record and a 3.66 ERA in 23 starts.

After being re-signed by Philadelphia in 1991, Carreño started the season with the AAA-level Scranton/Wilkes-Barre Red Barons. After spending the first three months of the season with the Red Barons, the Phillies placed Roger McDowell on the disabled list and called Carreño up to the major league roster. He made his major league debut on July 7, along with Tim Mauser against the New York Mets, then made two more appearances. In his final appearance on July 14, he was ejected when he struck Steve Decker with a pitch after being warned not to. He was sent back down to Scranton the next day, and finished the season with them. In 33 games, Carreño had four wins, eight losses, and a 5.33 ERA.

At the end of the 1991 season, Carreño became a free agent. He signed with the Baltimore Orioles in January 1992, and participated in spring training with them. He did not earn a spot on the roster, and his professional baseball career was over.

== See also ==
- List of players from Venezuela in Major League Baseball
