= Bret Saberhagen =

American baseball player (born 1964)

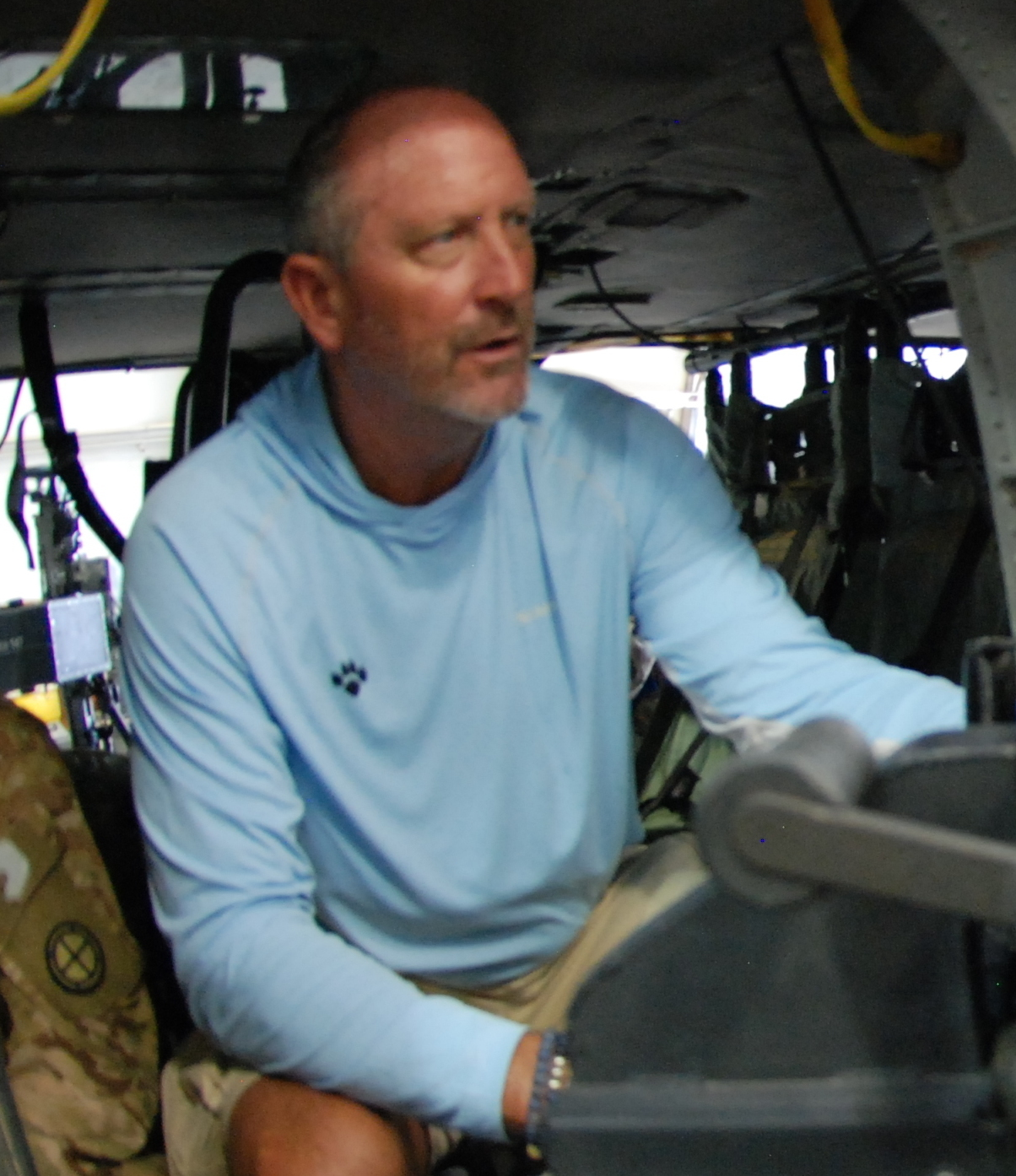
- Saberhagen in 2018
- Pitcher
- Born: April 11, 1964 (age 62); Chicago Heights, Illinois, U.S.
- Batted: Right Threw: Right

MLB debut
- April 4, 1984, for the Kansas City Royals

Last MLB appearance
- August 7, 2001, for the Boston Red Sox

MLB statistics
- Win–loss record: 167–117
- Earned run average: 3.34
- Strikeouts: 1,715
- Stats at Baseball Reference

Teams
- Kansas City Royals (1984–1991); New York Mets (1992–1995); Colorado Rockies (1995); Boston Red Sox (1997–1999, 2001)

Career highlights and awards
- 3× All-Star (1987, 1990, 1994); World Series champion (1985); 2× AL Cy Young Award (1985, 1989); World Series MVP (1985); Gold Glove Award (1989); MLB wins leader (1989); AL ERA leader (1989); Pitched a no-hitter on August 26, 1991; Kansas City Royals Hall of Fame

Bret William Saberhagen (/ˈseɪbərheɪɡɪn/; born April 11, 1964) is an American former professional baseball right-handed starting pitcher. He played in Major League Baseball (MLB) for the Kansas City Royals, New York Mets, Colorado Rockies, and Boston Red Sox from 1984 through 1999, and a comeback in 2001.

Known for his blazing fastball and pinpoint control, Saberhagen was named a three-time All-Star, a two-time Cy Young Award winner, a Gold Glove Award winner, and the Most Valuable Player of the 1985 World Series as the Royals beat the St. Louis Cardinals in 7 games. He led MLB in wins and earned run average in 1989, and threw a no-hitter in 1991.

== Early life ==
Saberhagen was born in Chicago Heights, Illinois. His parents, Linda and Bob, divorced when he was five years old. He attended Grover Cleveland High School, located in Reseda, California. Saberhagen starred in both basketball and baseball. In 1982, during his senior year, he pitched a no-hitter and was the winning pitcher in the Los Angeles City Championship game, played at Dodger Stadium. He also played football in high school.

== Professional career ==
=== Draft and minor leagues ===
Saberhagen was drafted out of high school by the Kansas City Royals in the 19th round of the 1982 Major League Baseball draft.

=== Kansas City Royals (1984–1991) ===
1984 photocard of Saberhagen for Kansas City Royals

Saberhagen made his major league debut at the age of 19 on April 4, 1984. He made an immediate impact, compiling a 10–11 record and a 3.48 ERA. He picked up his only major league save on July 23, 1984, during the second game of a double header. He pitched three scoreless innings to close out a 7–2 Royals win over the Blue Jays and preserve the win for starter Frank Wills. The Royals made the postseason but lost to the Detroit Tigers in the American League Championship Series. Saberhagen pitched well in his first postseason start, giving up two runs in eight innings.

In 1985, the 21-year-old Saberhagen established himself as the ace of the staff. He went 20–6 with a 2.87 ERA and won the American League Cy Young Award. He led the Royals to a World Series championship and was named MVP of the World Series, pitching two complete games, including a shutout in Game 7. He was also the subject of much media attention during the Series as his wife gave birth to his first son, Drew William, on the same night of the infamous Don Denkinger call.

Saberhagen developed an odd pattern of successful seasons in odd-numbered years (1985, 1987, 1989, 1991) and poor performances in even-numbered years. In 1986, he was 7–12 with a 4.12 ERA. In 1987, another odd-numbered year, Saberhagen had an excellent year, going 18–10 with a 3.36 ERA. That record, however, was disappointing because Saberhagen had entered the All-Star break with a 15–3 record and another Cy Young Award seemingly in the bag. He pitched in the 1987 Major League Baseball All-Star Game, but he suffered a shoulder injury that hampered his second-half performance.

In 1988, the pattern continued as Saberhagen went 14–16 for the Royals with a 3.80 ERA, the second most losses in the American League. The following year, 1989, he returned to his old brilliance by compiling a record of 23–6 with a 2.16 ERA, leading both leagues with 12 complete games, and finishing third in strikeouts. Before his July 26, 1989, start against the Boston Red Sox, Saberhagen had a record of 9–5. Over the next two months, he compiled a record of 14–1 with four shutouts. He also led the league in innings pitched, complete games, and strikeout to walk ratio. For his efforts, Saberhagen won his second Cy Young Award as the American League's best pitcher.

Despite a 5–7 record, Saberhagen was selected to the 1990 American League All-Star team, primarily due to his 1989 performance. He rewarded the selection by being the winning pitcher in the 2–0 American League triumph. Saberhagen pitched only one game after the all-star break before being shelved for most of the rest of 1990 with an injury.

In 1991, Saberhagen went 13–8 with a 3.07 ERA. On August 26, he no-hit the Chicago White Sox 7-0 at Royals Stadium; to date, the no-hitter is the last thrown by a Royal.

=== New York Mets (1992–1995) ===
On December 11, 1991, Saberhagen was traded along with Bill Pecota to the New York Mets in exchange for Kevin McReynolds, Gregg Jefferies, and Keith Miller.

With the trade to the Mets, Saberhagen's odd-year, off-year pattern vanished. He struggled with injuries in 1992 and 1993, before bouncing back with a 14–4 record in a strike shortened 1994 season. That season he had more wins than walks (14 to 13). No other pitcher (as of 2005) pitching more than 150 innings had accomplished this feat since 1919. His stint with the Mets was not without controversy; on July 27, 1993, Saberhagen sprayed bleach into a group of reporters. After admitting his role in this incident, Saberhagen donated one day's pay to charity and apologized to fans and the media.

=== Colorado Rockies (1995) ===
In 1995, he joined the Colorado Rockies. While the Rockies made the playoffs as the National League Wild Card team, Saberhagen had a mostly-lost season, marred by injuries. He lost his only post-season start, Game 4 of the NLDS, as the Rockies were eliminated by the Braves on their way to a World Series win.

Saberhagen didn't pitch at all in 1996 due to injury.

=== Boston Red Sox (1997–1999, 2001) ===
His comeback with the Boston Red Sox was limited in another injury-limited 1997 season, but reached its peak in 1998, as he went 15–8 that year, winning both the Sporting News Comeback Player of the Year Award and the Tony Conigliaro Award. He had another winning season for Boston in 1999, finishing with a 10–6 record.

After missing the 2000 season, Saberhagen attempted a comeback in 2001 but pitched in only three games. He retired at the end of the season.

== Post-playing career ==
In the late 1990s Saberhagen supervised the construction of "Bret Saberhagen's Hit and Fun", an indoor sports center and arcade which contained batting cages, laser tag, and other amusement facilities in Babylon Village, New York. The building was constructed to resemble Ebbets Field.

In 2005, he was inducted into the Kansas City Royals Hall of Fame.

Saberhagen was eligible for the 2007 ballot for the Baseball Hall of Fame. He stated if he were voted in, he would not attend the ceremony because he believes Pete Rose should be inducted. Saberhagen finished with seven votes and was not eligible for the next year's ballot. Having been retired as an active player since 2001, Saberhagen is currently eligible to be inducted under the Contemporary Baseball Era committee for players who made their greatest contributions from 1980 onwards.

In 2006, he began coaching the Calabasas High School Coyotes Varsity baseball team, in Calabasas, California. He was a primary contributor to the building of a first-class baseball field for the Varsity team there. His younger son Dalton played on the Freshman team at that time and Saberhagen's goal was to coach his son when he moved up to Varsity. However, a constant set of battles with the Las Virgines Unified School District administration—among other reasons—caused him to resign his coaching duties in October 2007. Before the 2008 season, Saberhagen returned as the head coach of the Calabasas varsity team. He currently resides in Thousand Oaks, California.

In October 2017, Saberhagen was evacuated from a Napa hotel due to the Tubbs Fire after attending a charity golf event.

== Personal life ==
On February 9, 2019, Saberhagen married Kandace DeAngelo, the president and CEO of a medical group and a Colorado State University graduate. Kandace is a three time breast cancer survivor and together they have created their nonprofit, SabesWings, to help eliminate medical financial toxicity for cancer patients struggling to pay their bills.

Saberhagen's first wife was Janeane Inglett. They were married from 1984 to 1994, and have three children together.

Saberhagen's son, Drew William, played college baseball for the Western Carolina Catamounts and the Pepperdine Waves.

Saberhagen's oldest daughter, Brittany Saberhagen-Zachar, is the wife of Greek star, Jacob Zachar. The couple made ET's Happiest Celebrity Engagements of 2018.

Saberhagen's second son, Dalton Saberhagen, was a left handed pitcher for the University of Tennessee Volunteers. He was named to the 2013 SEC Community Service team and Tennessee Volunteer.

Saberhagen has two stepsons. Aidan Stolz is an aspiring writer and is a board member for the Saberhagen's nonprofit, SabesWings. Layton Stolz is his youngest stepson.

In November 2022, Saberhagen discovered information about his deceased biological parents with the last name Spuhler, and found that he had a half-brother and a half-sister who were still alive.

== Other media ==
Saberhagen appeared as himself in the 1994 Brendan Fraser movie The Scout. In the movie, he is hired by former New York Yankees scout Al Percolo (Albert Brooks) to pitch to Percolo's phenom prospect Steve Nebraska (Brendan Fraser).

During the 1994-95 MLB strike, Saberhagen and a handful of other striking players appeared as themselves in the November 27, 1994, episode "A Man for No Seasons" of Married... with Children.

== See also ==
- List of Major League Baseball annual ERA leaders
- List of Major League Baseball annual wins leaders
- List of Major League Baseball no-hitters

| Preceded by Wilson Álvarez | No-hitter pitcher August 26, 1991 | Succeeded by Kent Mercker, Mark Wohlers & Alejandro Peña |
