= Mark Lewis (baseball) =

American baseball player (born 1969)

- Infielder
- Born: November 30, 1969 (age 56); Knoxville, TN, U.S.
- Batted: Right Threw: Right

MLB debut
- April 26, 1991, for the Cleveland Indians

Last MLB appearance
- May 30, 2001, for the Cleveland Indians

MLB statistics
- Batting average: .263
- Home runs: 48
- Runs batted in: 306
- Stats at Baseball Reference

Teams
- Cleveland Indians (1991–1994); Cincinnati Reds (1995); Detroit Tigers (1996); San Francisco Giants (1997); Philadelphia Phillies (1998); Cincinnati Reds (1999–2000); Baltimore Orioles (2000); Cleveland Indians (2001)

Mark David Lewis (born November 30, 1969) is an American former professional baseball infielder who played in Major League Baseball (MLB) for the Cleveland Indians, Cincinnati Reds, Detroit Tigers, San Francisco Giants, Philadelphia Phillies, and Baltimore Orioles.

== Stats ==
Lewis amassed 48 home runs, 306 RBI and a .263 batting average over 902 games of major league play. A large majority of his home runs came between 1996 and 1999. During those four years he hit 36 home runs (11, 10, 9, and 6, respectively). He did not hit a single home run as a rookie for the Indians in more than 300 at bats. His career highlight may have occurred in Game 3 of the 1995 National League Division Series when as a member of the Cincinnati Reds, playing against the Los Angeles Dodgers, he hit the first pinch-hit grand slam in postseason history. Lewis recorded the final out at Cleveland Stadium as a pinch hitter on October 3, 1993.

After the 2001 season, Lewis became a free agent, ending his major league career at the age of 31. He briefly attempted a comeback in 2007 with the Long Island Ducks, but it lasted just one game.
