= Lance Painter =

English baseball player (born 1967)

- Pitcher
- Born: July 21, 1967 (age 58); Bedford, England
- Batted: Left Threw: Left

MLB debut
- May 19, 1993, for the Colorado Rockies

Last MLB appearance
- September 9, 2003, for the St. Louis Cardinals

MLB statistics
- Win–loss record: 25–18
- Earned run average: 5.24
- Strikeouts: 331
- Stats at Baseball Reference

Teams
- Colorado Rockies (1993–1996); St. Louis Cardinals (1997–1999); Toronto Blue Jays (2000–2001); Milwaukee Brewers (2001); St. Louis Cardinals (2003)

Lance Telford Painter (born July 21, 1967) is an English former Major League Baseball left-handed pitcher. He played in Major League Baseball (MLB) for the Colorado Rockies, St. Louis Cardinals, Toronto Blue Jays and Milwaukee Brewers. Although he started 28 games, Painter was used primarily as a reliever. He became a U.S. citizen before the start of the 1994 season.

== Professional career ==
Painter played college baseball at the University of Wisconsin–Madison. Painter was drafted in the 25th round of the 1990 Major League Baseball draft by the San Diego Padres. While playing with the Rockies in the 1995 NLDS he pinch hit in the ninth inning of game one (striking out), then started the next day in a losing effort against the Atlanta Braves. During the 1998 season with the Cardinals, Painter appeared in 65 games, went 4–0, and posted a 3.99 ERA. Painter appeared in 314 major league games and posted a career ERA of 5.24. He retired after the 2003 season.

== Coaching career ==
Lance was the pitching coach of the Great Britain national baseball team during the 2005 European Baseball Championships in the Czech Republic. GB placed 7th, just missing out on the qualification round for the World Championships. Lance is now the pitching coach for the Tacoma Rainiers.

From 2006–2007, Painter was the pitching coach of the Single-A Wisconsin Timber Rattlers in the Seattle Mariners organization. In 2008, he was named the pitching coach for the Single-A High Desert Mavericks. On 13 January 2009, he was named the pitching coach of the Single-A Clinton LumberKings. After the 2009 season he was named the pitching coach for the Double-A West Tenn Diamond Jaxx of the Southern League.
