= Kevin Ritz (baseball) =

American baseball player (born 1965)

- Pitcher
- Born: June 8, 1965 (age 61); Eatontown, New Jersey, U.S.
- Batted: Right Threw: Right

MLB debut
- July 15, 1989, for the Detroit Tigers

Last MLB appearance
- May 16, 1998, for the Colorado Rockies

MLB statistics
- Win–loss record: 45–56
- Earned run average: 5.35
- Strikeouts: 462

Teams
- Detroit Tigers (1989–1992); Colorado Rockies (1994–1998)

Kevin D. Ritz (born June 8, 1965) is an American former Major League Baseball right-handed pitcher. Ritz grew up in Bloomfield, Iowa. He is an alumnus of William Penn University and Indian Hills Community College.

Ritz was drafted by the Detroit Tigers in the fourth round of the 1985 MLB amateur draft. He pitched for the Detroit Tigers (1989–92) and the Colorado Rockies (1994–1998). In 1989, Ritz was honored as Tigers' Rookie of the Year.

Ritz had his big break when he joined the Rockies in 1994, where he found some success in his career. He was a member of the first Colorado Rockies team to reach the playoffs, being the ace of the 1995 team that won the Wild Card with 11 wins and a 4.21 ERA. His best season was in 1996, when he went 17-11 in 213 innings pitched, despite recording a high ERA of 5.28 in hitter-friendly Coors Field and leading the National League in Earned Runs Allowed (125). That year, Ritz won 10 games before the All Star break; the only other Rockies pitchers to have done so through 2010 were Shawn Chacón (2003), Aaron Cook (2008), Jason Marquis (2009), and Ubaldo Jiménez (2010).

Ritz was an excellent fielding pitcher in his major league career. In 753.1 innings pitched in 151 games, he committed only two errors in 211 total chances for a .991 fielding percentage.
