= Jorge Brito (baseball) =

Dominican baseball player (born 1966)

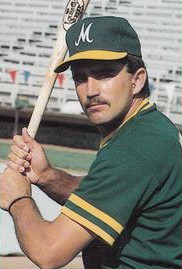
- Brito in 1988
- Catcher
- Born: June 22, 1966 (age 59); Monción, Dominican Republic
- Batted: Right Threw: Right

MLB debut
- April 30, 1995, for the Colorado Rockies

Last MLB appearance
- April 21, 1996, for the Colorado Rockies

MLB statistics
- Batting average: .185
- Hits: 12
- Doubles: 3
- Stats at Baseball Reference

Teams
- Colorado Rockies (1995–1996)

Jorge Manuel Brito Uceta (born June 22, 1966) is a Dominican former Major League Baseball catcher for the Colorado Rockies.

After being signed as an amateur free agent by the Oakland Athletics in 1986, Brito would make his Major League Baseball debut with the Colorado Rockies on April 30, 1995, and appear in his final game on April 21, 1996.

Brito spent both of his seasons at the Major League level serving as a backup catcher to former Rockies starters Joe Girardi and Jeff Reed.
