= Jason Bates =

American baseball player (born 1971)

- Infielder
- Born: January 5, 1971 (age 55); Downey, California, U.S.
- Batted: Switch Threw: Right

MLB debut
- April 26, 1995, for the Colorado Rockies

Last MLB appearance
- September 27, 1998, for the Colorado Rockies

MLB statistics
- Batting average: .239
- Home runs: 12
- Runs batted in: 69
- Stats at Baseball Reference

Teams
- Colorado Rockies (1995–1998)

Jason Charles Bates (born January 5, 1971) is an American former Major League Baseball infielder who played a total of four seasons, spanning from 1995 to 1998. Bates played his final game on September 27, 1998, as a member of the Colorado Rockies.
