= A. J. Sager =

American baseball player & coach (born 1965)

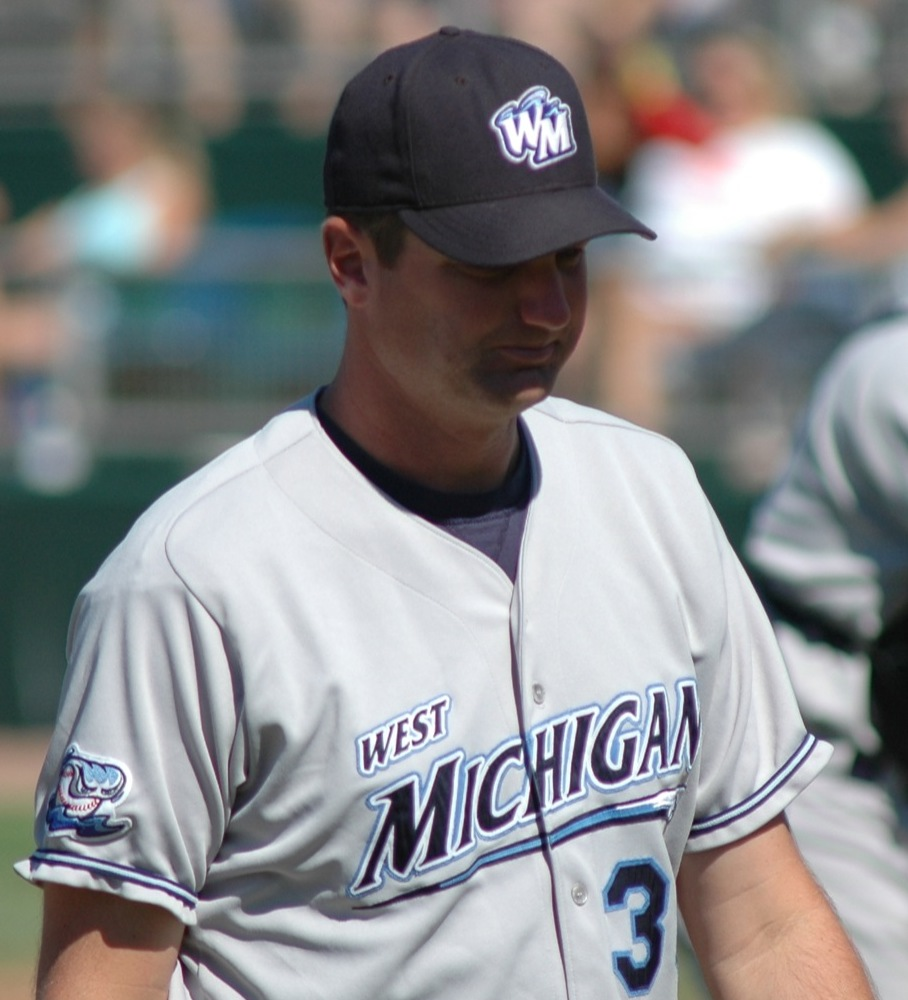
- Sager with the West Michigan White Caps in 2005
- Pitcher
- Born: March 3, 1965 (age 61); Columbus, Ohio, U.S.
- Batted: Right Threw: Right

MLB debut
- April 4, 1994, for the San Diego Padres

Last MLB appearance
- September 26, 1998, for the Detroit Tigers

MLB statistics
- Win–loss record: 12–15
- Earned run average: 5.36
- Strikeouts: 164
- Stats at Baseball Reference

Teams
- San Diego Padres (1994); Colorado Rockies (1995); Detroit Tigers (1996–1998)

Anthony Joseph Sager (born March 3, 1965) is an American former professional baseball right-handed pitcher. He currently serves as the pitching coach for the Syracuse Mets. Sager played in Major League Baseball (MLB) for the San Diego Padres (1994), Colorado Rockies (1995), and Detroit Tigers (1996–1998).

== College career ==
He is an alumnus of the University of Toledo. He played both college football and college baseball at Toledo.

== Playing career ==
Drafted by the San Diego Padres in the 10th round of the 1988 MLB amateur draft, Sager made his Major League Baseball debut with the San Diego Padres on April 4, 1994, and appeared in his final game with the Detroit Tigers on September 26, 1998.

== Coaching career ==
Prior to being promoted to the roving pitching instructor in 2013, Sager was the pitching coach for the Toledo Mud Hens. On June 27, 2018, Sager was named bullpen coach for the Detroit Tigers.

On February 5, 2025, the New York Mets hired Sager to serve as the pitching coach for their Triple-A affiliate, the Syracuse Mets.
