= Curt Leskanic =

American baseball player (born 1968)

Curtis Leskanic
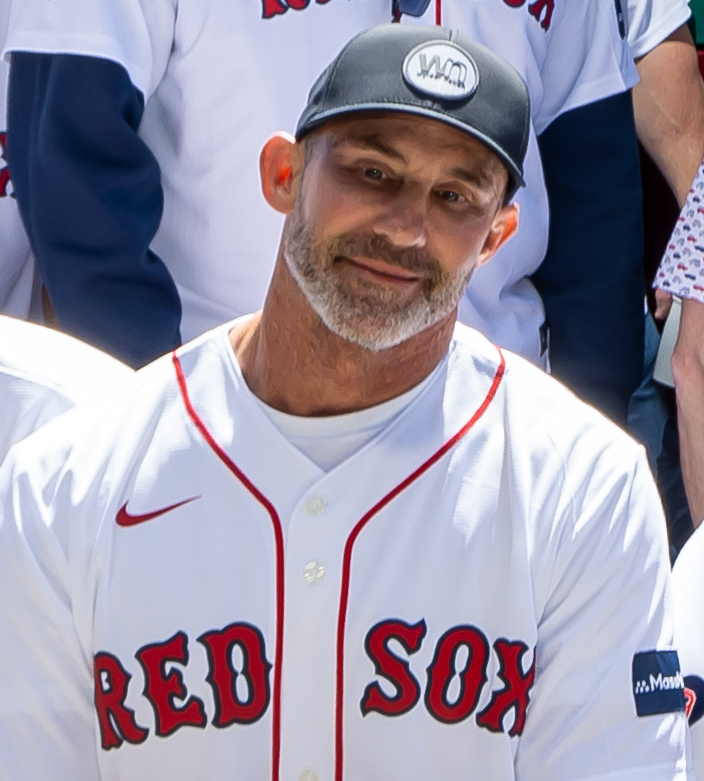
- Leskanic in 2024 celebrating the 20th anniversary of the 2004 World Series
- Pitcher
- Born: April 2, 1968 (age 58); Homestead, Pennsylvania, U.S.
- Batted: Right Threw: Right

MLB debut
- June 27, 1993, for the Colorado Rockies

Last MLB appearance
- October 2, 2004, for the Boston Red Sox

MLB statistics
- Win–loss record: 50–34
- Earned run average: 4.36
- Strikeouts: 641
- Stats at Baseball Reference

Teams
- Colorado Rockies (1993–1999); Milwaukee Brewers (2000–2001, 2003); Kansas City Royals (2003–2004); Boston Red Sox (2004)

Career highlights and awards
- World Series champion (2004)

Curtis John Leskanic (/lɛsˈkænɪk/; born April 2, 1968) is an American former Major League Baseball relief pitcher. During a 12-year baseball career, he pitched from 1993 to 2004 for the Colorado Rockies, Milwaukee Brewers, Kansas City Royals and Boston Red Sox. He is currently a professional scout for the Red Sox.

== Career ==
Leskanic was drafted in the eighth round of the 1989 baseball amateur entry draft out of Louisiana State University by the Cleveland Indians, but was traded in 1992 to the Minnesota Twins with Oscar Múñoz for Paul Sorrento. Later that same year, he was drafted by the Colorado Rockies in the 1992 Expansion Draft. In 1993, he made his major league debut with the Rockies.

By 2003, he was dealing with a "labral tear in my shoulder” that meant he could only pitch roughly twice a week. In the middle of his second season with the Kansas City Royals, he was released on June 18. On June 22, he was picked up by the Boston Red Sox. He went through a multi-week stint on the disabled list but ultimately was ready for the postseason run. He made three appearances during the 2004 ALCS against the New York Yankees and was credited with the Game 4 win. His 1 1/3 innings of shutout baseball during Game 4 were the last he would ever throw; he retired following the 2004 season. He did make a return to Fenway Park for Opening Day 2005; there he received his World Series ring, as well as a large ovation. For Opening Day 2008, he got to carry out the World Series trophy.

Leskanic was a Little League coach in Florida and a scouting consultant for Boston before joining the Red Sox professional scouting staff for the 2008 season.

== Personal life ==
Leskanic has a son, Brandon, and two daughters, Chloe and Chandler. His cousin Katrina Leskanich was the lead singer of Katrina and the Waves.

== See also ==
- List of Colorado Rockies team records
