= Glenn Dishman =

American baseball player (born 1970)

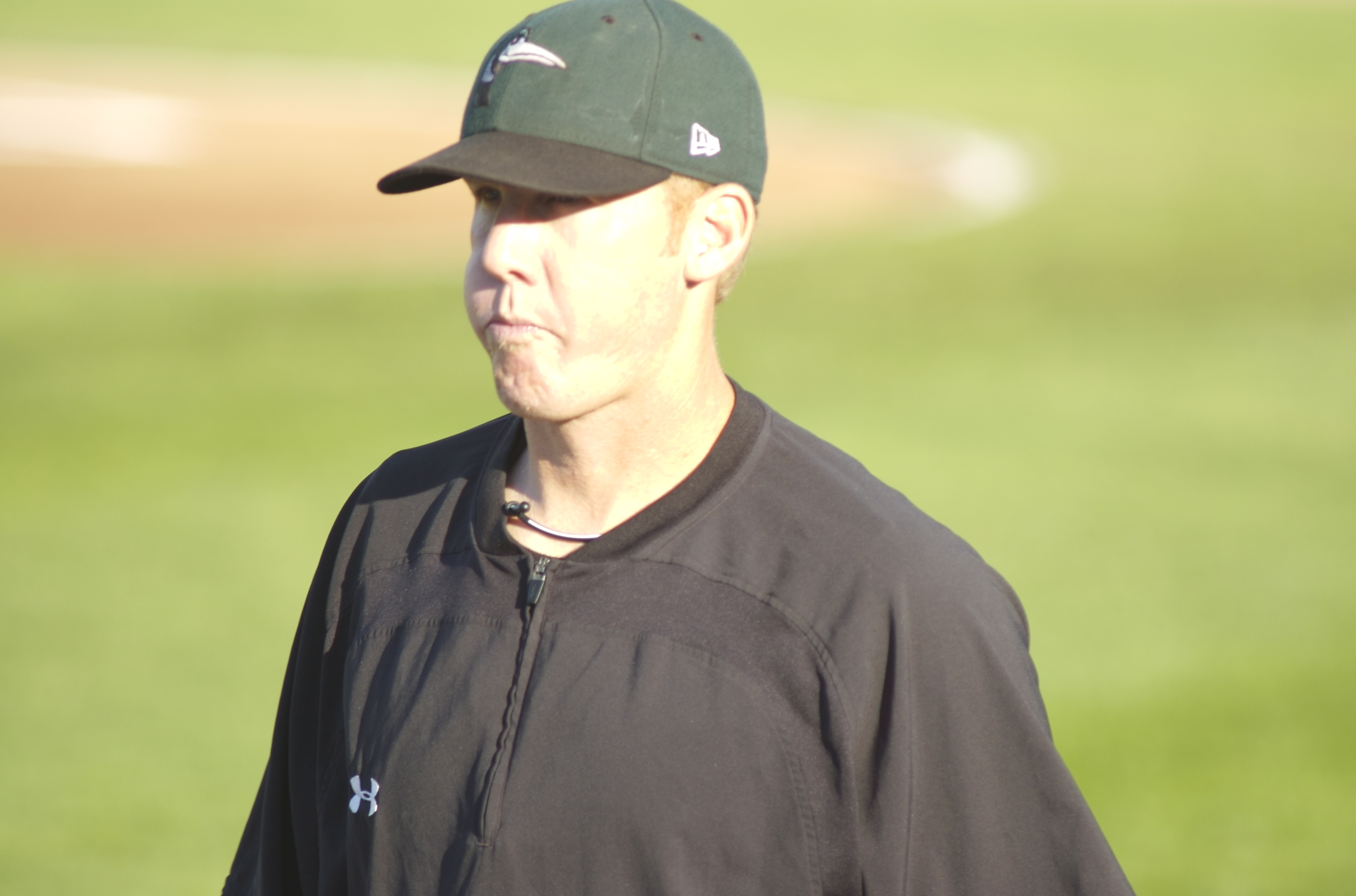

Piratas de Campeche
- Pitcher / Coach
- Born: November 5, 1970 (age 55); Baltimore, Maryland, U.S.
- Batted: Right Threw: Left

Professional debut
- MLB: June 22, 1995, for the San Diego Padres
- CPBL: March 9, 2001, for the Sinon Bulls

Last appearance
- MLB: September 7, 1997, for the Detroit Tigers
- CPBL: May 11, 2001, for the Sinon Bulls

MLB statistics
- Win–loss record: 5–10
- Earned run average: 5.25
- Strikeouts: 66

CPBL statistics
- Win–loss record: 2–4
- Earned run average: 2.72
- Strikeouts: 40
- Stats at Baseball Reference

Teams
- San Diego Padres (1995–1996); Philadelphia Phillies (1996); Detroit Tigers (1997); Sinon Bulls (2001)

Glenelg Edward Dishman (born November 5, 1970) is an American former professional baseball left-handed pitcher who currently serves as the pitching coach for the Piratas de Campeche of the Mexican League. He played in Major League Baseball (MLB) for the San Diego Padres, Philadelphia Phillies, and Detroit Tigers from 1995 to 1997. He also played in Chinese Professional Baseball League (CPBL) for the Sinon Bulls in 2001.

== Playing career ==
=== Amateur ===
Dishman attended Moreau Catholic High School in Hayward, California and went to college at University of California Berkeley and Texas Christian University.

=== San Diego Padres ===
Dishman was signed as an undrafted free agent by the San Diego Padres on May 23, 1993 and reported to their Class-A minor league affiliate at Spokane for the 1993 season. He compiled a record of 6–3, a 2.20 earned run average (ERA) in 12 starts (with 2 complete game shut outs) that season and was selected as a "Short Season A All-Star" and a Northwest League All-Star. On July 17, Dishman pitched a no-hitter against Yakima. He came within one out of a perfect game, but his first baseman committed an error.

In 1994, with the Double-A Wichita Wranglers, Dishman was 11–8 in 27 starts with a 2.82 ERA and was a Texas League All-Star. In 1995, with the Las Vegas Stars, he was 6–3 in 14 starts with a 2.55 ERA and won Pacific Coast League (PCL) All-Star honors.

Dishman made his major league debut on June 22, 1995, for the Padres against the Colorado Rockies as a starting pitcher. He worked 5 innings, allowed 3 earned runs, and received the loss as the Rockies defeated the Padres 3–2. In his next start, against the Los Angeles Dodgers on June 27 Dishman worked 6 innings, allowed 1 earned run, and recorded his first career victory.

Dishman alternated between the Padres and Las Vegas for the next couple of seasons.

=== Philadelphia Phillies ===
Dishman was picked up on waivers by the Philadelphia Phillies on September 12, 1996. He appeared in 4 games for the Phillies that season and was waived after the season.

=== Detroit Tigers ===
Signed by the Detroit Tigers for the 1997 season, Dishman spent most of the season with the Triple-A Toledo Mud Hens, appearing in seven games for the Tigers, including four as a starter. Released by the Tigers after the season, he did not play professionally in 1998.

=== Milwaukee Brewers ===
In 2000, Dishman attempted a comeback with the Milwaukee Brewers’ Double-A team, the Huntsville Stars, appearing in 42 games, all but one in relief.

=== Mexico / Western League ===
Dishman spent 2001 with the Reynosa Broncos in the Mexican League and the Sinon Bulls in the Taiwan Professional Baseball League.

Dishman pitched in 1999 and 2002 with the Sonoma County Crushers of the (independent) Western Baseball League.

== Coaching career ==
In 2003, Dishman began his coaching career, joining the staff at Texas Christian University. He then joined Ohlone College in Fremont, California for the 2003 season. He also coached in the Hawaiian Winter League in 2006 and the Venezuelan Winter League in 2011.

Dishman then joined the Los Angeles Dodgers organization as pitching coach for the Columbus Catfish (2005), the Vero Beach Dodgers (2006), Great Lakes Loons (2007, 2015), Jacksonville Suns (2008), Chattanooga Lookouts (2009), and Albuquerque Isotopes (2010–2014). In 2014, Dishman was named as the PCL's pitching coach for their All-Star Game in Durham, North Carolina. In 2015, he was once again named the pitching coach for the Loons. The Dodgers released Dishman from his contract after the season.

From 2016 to 2017 Dishman served as the Arizona League Giants’ pitching coach. For the 2018–19 seasons, he was pitching coach for the Giants’ Double-A affiliate, the Richmond Flying Squirrels affiliate. In 2020, Dishman was the pitching coach for the Sacramento River Cats, San Francisco's Triple-A affiliate.

In 2021, Dishman took a position with the MLB Draft League for their inaugural season, serving as the pitching coach for the Frederick Keys.

In 2022, Dishman assumed a position with the Miami Marlins as the pitching coach for their Low-A affiliate, the Jupiter Hammerheads.

On January 9, 2026, Dishman was hired to serve as the pitching coach for the Piratas de Campeche of the Mexican League.
