= Tim Mauser =

American baseball player (born 1966)

- Pitcher
- Born: October 4, 1966 (age 59); Fort Worth, Texas, U.S.
- Batted: Right Threw: Right

MLB debut
- July 7, 1991, for the Philadelphia Phillies

Last MLB appearance
- May 5, 1995, for the San Diego Padres

MLB statistics
- Win–loss record: 2–6
- Earned run average: 4.37
- Strikeouts: 93
- Stats at Baseball Reference

Teams
- Philadelphia Phillies (1991, 1993); San Diego Padres (1993–1995)

Timothy Edward Mauser (born October 4, 1966) is an American former professional baseball pitcher. He played in Major League Baseball (MLB) for the Philadelphia Phillies and San Diego Padres.

== Career ==
Mauser graduated from Arlington Heights High School in Fort Worth, Texas in 1985 before playing college baseball at Texas Christian. He set a school record with 120 strikeouts in a season and was named all-Southwest Conference in 1988. He was one of the last players cut from the United States national baseball team before the 1988 Summer Olympics.

Mauser was selected in the third round of the 1988 Major League Baseball draft by the Philadelphia Phillies. He was assigned to the Spartanburg Phillies of the South Atlantic League to start his professional career. In 1989, Baseball America ranked him the best prospect in the Phillies farm system.

On July 3, 1991, the Phillies demoted Darrel Akerfelds and promoted Mauser to the big leagues. He made his Major League debut on July 7 against the New York Mets at Veterans Stadium in relief of Amalio Carreño. He gave up a home run to Daryl Boston in three innings of work. He appeared in only three games that season, all out of the bullpen. According to Mauser, he struggled in moving up a level and transitioning from starting to relieving mid-season. It was not until the 1992 season that Mauser began working primarily out of the bullpen for the Scranton/Wilkes-Barre Red Barons after relief pitchers Bob Ayrault and Jay Baller were called up to the Major League roster.

On July 3, 1993, the Phillies traded Mauser to the San Diego Padres for Roger Mason. Mauser saw regular use in the San Diego bullpen for the remainder of the 1993 season. In 1994, he was used as the setup man for future Hall of Fame closer Trevor Hoffman. Mauser appeared in the final five games of his big league career in 1995 and spent most of the season in the minors with the Las Vegas Stars. In 1996, his final season in professional baseball, he played in the Texas Rangers system and in the Mexican League for the Olmecas de Tabasco.

== Personal life ==
Mauser's wife, Karen, gave birth to their first child, a daughter named Mallory, in early 1993. He was described in the Times Leader in 1993 as a "country music enthusiast."
