= Mark Thompson (baseball) =

American baseball player (born 1971)

- Pitcher
- Born: April 7, 1971 (age 55); Russellville, Kentucky, U.S.
- Batted: Right Threw: Right

MLB debut
- July 26, 1994, for the Colorado Rockies

Last MLB appearance
- July 27, 2000, for the St. Louis Cardinals

MLB statistics
- Win–loss record: 18–24
- Earned run average: 5.74
- Strikeouts: 198
- Stats at Baseball Reference

Teams
- Colorado Rockies (1994–1998); St. Louis Cardinals (1998–2000)

Mark Radford Thompson (born April 7, 1971) is an American former right-handed pitcher in Major League Baseball.

Thompson graduated from Logan County High School in Russellville, Kentucky and he then attended the University of Kentucky. In 1991, he played collegiate summer baseball with the Brewster Whitecaps of the Cape Cod Baseball League.

Standing at 6 ft 2 in (1.88 m) tall and 205 pounds (one source has him at 213), Thompson was selected by the Colorado Rockies 65th overall in the second round of the 1992 draft. In his first two minor league seasons, he was an effective pitcher, posting a record of 14–6.

He spent less than three seasons in the minors before making his big league debut on July 26, 1994 against the San Diego Padres. He earned the win in that game, but his overall earned run average in his rookie season (which consisted of two games) was 9.00.

He spent most of the rest of his career bouncing between the majors and minors. He spent only one season entirely in the majors-1996, when he posted a 9–11 record with a 5.30 ERA. He was ninth in the league in shutouts that year (with one), but he was also ninth in runs allowed (100) and fourth in hit batsmen (13).

He finished his major league career with an 18–24 record, with a 5.74 ERA. He struck out 198 and walked 161 in 337 innings pitched.

He had a .154 batting average in 104 career at bats, with the highlight of his batting career being the home run he hit off of Kent Bottenfield in a 1997 game. He appeared in one postseason game in his career, pitching a perfect inning for the save in the 1995 National League Division Series. He played his final major league game on July 27, 2000.

He stuck around in the minors until 2003, when he finished his career with the independent Long Island Ducks.

In 2006, he was the pitching coach for the Casper Rockies.

Thompson in the 2010s has worked in a variety of professional positions in his native Kentucky, serving among other things as a representative for the school memorabilia company Jostens.
