= Mike Munoz (baseball) =

American baseball player (born 1965)

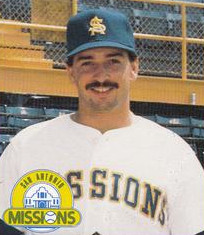
- Munoz in 1988
- Pitcher
- Born: July 12, 1965 (age 61); Baldwin Park, California, U.S.
- Batted: Left Threw: Left

MLB debut
- September 6, 1989, for the Los Angeles Dodgers

Last MLB appearance
- April 26, 2000, for the Texas Rangers

MLB statistics
- Win–loss record: 18–20
- Earned run average: 5.19
- Strikeouts: 240
- Stats at Baseball Reference

Teams
- Los Angeles Dodgers (1989–1990); Detroit Tigers (1991–1993); Colorado Rockies (1993–1998); Texas Rangers (1999–2000)

Michael Anthony Munoz (born July 12, 1965), is an American former professional baseball player who pitched in the Major Leagues from 1989 to 2000.
