= Bruce Ruffin (baseball) =

American baseball player (born 1963)

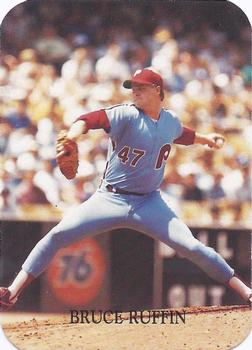
- Pitcher
- Born: October 4, 1963 (age 62); Lubbock, Texas, U.S.
- Batted: Both Threw: Left

MLB debut
- June 28, 1986, for the Philadelphia Phillies

Last MLB appearance
- June 26, 1997, for the Colorado Rockies

MLB statistics
- Win–loss record: 60–82
- Earned run average: 4.19
- Strikeouts: 843
- Stats at Baseball Reference

Teams
- Philadelphia Phillies (1986–1991); Milwaukee Brewers (1992); Colorado Rockies (1993–1997)

Bruce Wayne Ruffin (born October 4, 1963) is an American former professional baseball pitcher who played in Major League Baseball (MLB) for the Philadelphia Phillies (1986–91), Milwaukee Brewers (1992), and Colorado Rockies (1993–97).

Ruffin is a 1982 graduate of J. M. Hanks High School. While attending the University of Texas, Ruffin was a member of the 1983 National Champional Squad. He was selected in the second round (34th overall) of the 1985 Major League Baseball draft by the Philadelphia Phillies. Ruffin finished 7th in voting for the 1986 National League (NL) Rookie of the Year Award, with a 9-4 record and a 2.46 earned run average (ERA). He was promoted from the minor leagues to replace Steve Carlton in the Phillies' rotation after Carlton's release.

His son Chance was later a pitcher for the Seattle Mariners.

== See also ==
- List of Major League Baseball single-inning strikeout leaders
