= Florida State Seminoles football annual team awards =

These are the Florida State Seminoles football annual team award recipients.

== Bob Crenshaw and Monk Bonasorte awards ==
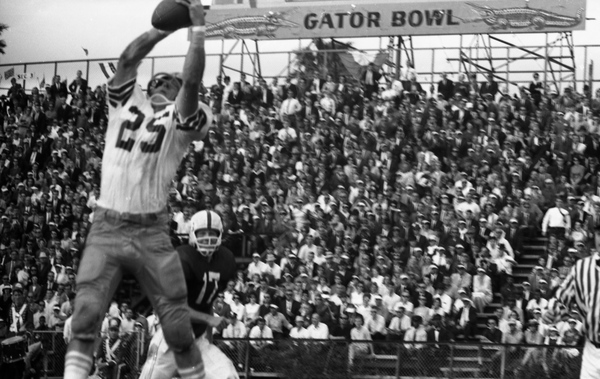
The Biletnikoff Award is named after FSU alum Fred Biletnikoff.

The Tallahassee Quarterback Club sponsors an award, known as the Bob Crenshaw Award that is given in memory of a special Seminole football player whose courage and fighting spirit was an inspiration to others.

The award is given in the memory of Robert E. (Bob) Crenshaw who played football from 1952 to 1955. The 175 pounds offensive lineman was the captain of the team in 1954 and a student leader. He was killed in a jet crash in 1958. The plaque's inscription reads: "To the football player with the Biggest Heart." The recipient is chosen by his teammates as the man who best exemplifies the qualities that made Bob Crenshaw an outstanding football player and person. Following the 2016 season, the award is given to offensive players.

Year	Name	Position
1958	Al Ulmer	G
1959	Ramon Rogers	C
1960	Abner Bigbie	FB
1961	Paul Andrews	FB
1962	Jim Sims	T
1964	Larry Brinkley	FB
1964	Dick Hermann	LB
1965	Howard Ehler	DB
1966	Ed Pope	G
1967	Kim Hammond	QB
1968	Billy Gunter	RB
1969	Stan Walker	G
1970	Bill Lohse	LB
1971	Bill Henson	DT
1972	David Snell	DB
1973	Steve Bratton	DE
1974	Jeff Gardner	OG
1975	Lee Nelson	DB
1976	Joe Camps	DB
1977	Aaron Carter	LB
1978	Scott Warren	DE
1979	Greg Futch	OT
1980	Monk Bonasorte	DB
1981	Barry Voltapetti	OT
1982	Blair Williams	QB
1983	Ken Roe	LB
1984	Todd Stroud	NG
1985	Pete Panton	TE
1986	Greg Newell	FS
1987	Mark Salva	C
1988	Jason Kuipers	OG
1989	Tony Yeomans	OG
1990	Lawrence Dawsey	WR
1991	Dan Footman	DE
1992	Robbie Baker	C
1993	Jon Nance	NG
1994	Steve Gilmer	S
1994	Enzo Armella	NG
1995	Todd Rebol	LB
1996	Connell Spain	DT
1997	Greg Spires	DE
1998	Troy Saunders	CB
1999	Reggie Durden	CB
2000	Patrick Newton	LB
2001	Bradley Jennings	LB
2002	Anquan Boldin	WR
2003	David Castillo	C
2004	Bryant McFadden	CB
2005	Andre Fluellen	DT
2006	Darius McClure	S
2007	Anthony Houllis	S
2008	Ryan McMahon	C
2009	Ryan McMahon	C
2009	Markus White	DE
2010	Andrew Datko	OT
2011	EJ Manuel	QB
2011	Lamarcus Joyner	S
2012	Telvin Smith	LB
2012	Devonta Freeman	RB
2013	Devonta Freeman	RB
2013	Lamarcus Joyner	DB
2014	Josue Matias	OG
2014	Eddie Goldman	DT
2015	Kareem Are	OG
2015	Reggie Northrup	LB
2016	Deondre Francois	QB
2017	Derrick Kelly	OG
2018	Derrick Kelly	OG
2019	James Blackman	QB
2021	Jordan Wilson	TE
2022	Mycah Pittman	WR
2022	Camren McDonald	TE
2023	D'Mitri Emmanuel	OG
2023	Johnny Wilson	WR
2024	Lawrance Toafili	RB
2025	Roydell Williams	RB
2025	Randy Pittman, Jr.	TE

Beginning in 2017, The Tallahassee Quarterback Club began sponsoring another award, known as the Monk Bonasorte Award. The award is given in the memory of Monk Bonasorte who played football from 1977 to 1980. He would later return to the university to work in the athletic department before dying of cancer. The award is given to defensive players and the recipient is also chosen by his teammates as the man who best exemplifies the qualities that made Monk Bonasorte an outstanding football player as well as person.

Year	Name	Position
2017	Josh Sweat	DE
2018	Dontavious Jackson	LB
2019	Marvin Wilson	DT
2021	Keir Thomas	DE
2022	Kalen DeLoach	LB
2022	Tatum Bethune	LB
2023	Shyheim Brown	DB
2023	Patrick Payton	DE
2024	Kevin Knowles	CB
2025	Ethan Pritchard	LB
