= Bob Crenshaw Award =

Annual sports award in the USA

- Awarded for: The Player with the Biggest Heart Florida State Football
- Location: Tallahassee, Florida
- Country: United States
- Presented by: Tallahassee Quarterback Club Foundation, Inc.

History
- First award: 1958
- Website: http://www.tallahasseeqbclub.com/

Bob Crenshaw Award is an annual award presented to a player on the Florida State Seminoles football team to recognize individual performance. This award is typical of most athletic awards, such as Most Valuable Player and Defensive Seminole Warrior Awards. However, the Tallahassee Quarterback Club sponsors an award that is given in memory of a special Seminole football player whose courage and fighting spirit was an inspiration to others.

The award is given in the memory of Robert E. (Bob) Crenshaw who played Florida State Seminoles football from 1952 to 1955. The 175-pound offensive lineman was the captain of the team in 1954 and a student leader. He was killed in a jet crash in 1958. The plaque's inscription reads: "To the Football Player with the Biggest Heart." The recipient is chosen by his teammates as the man who best exemplifies the qualities that made Bob Crenshaw an outstanding football player and person.

== Award winners ==
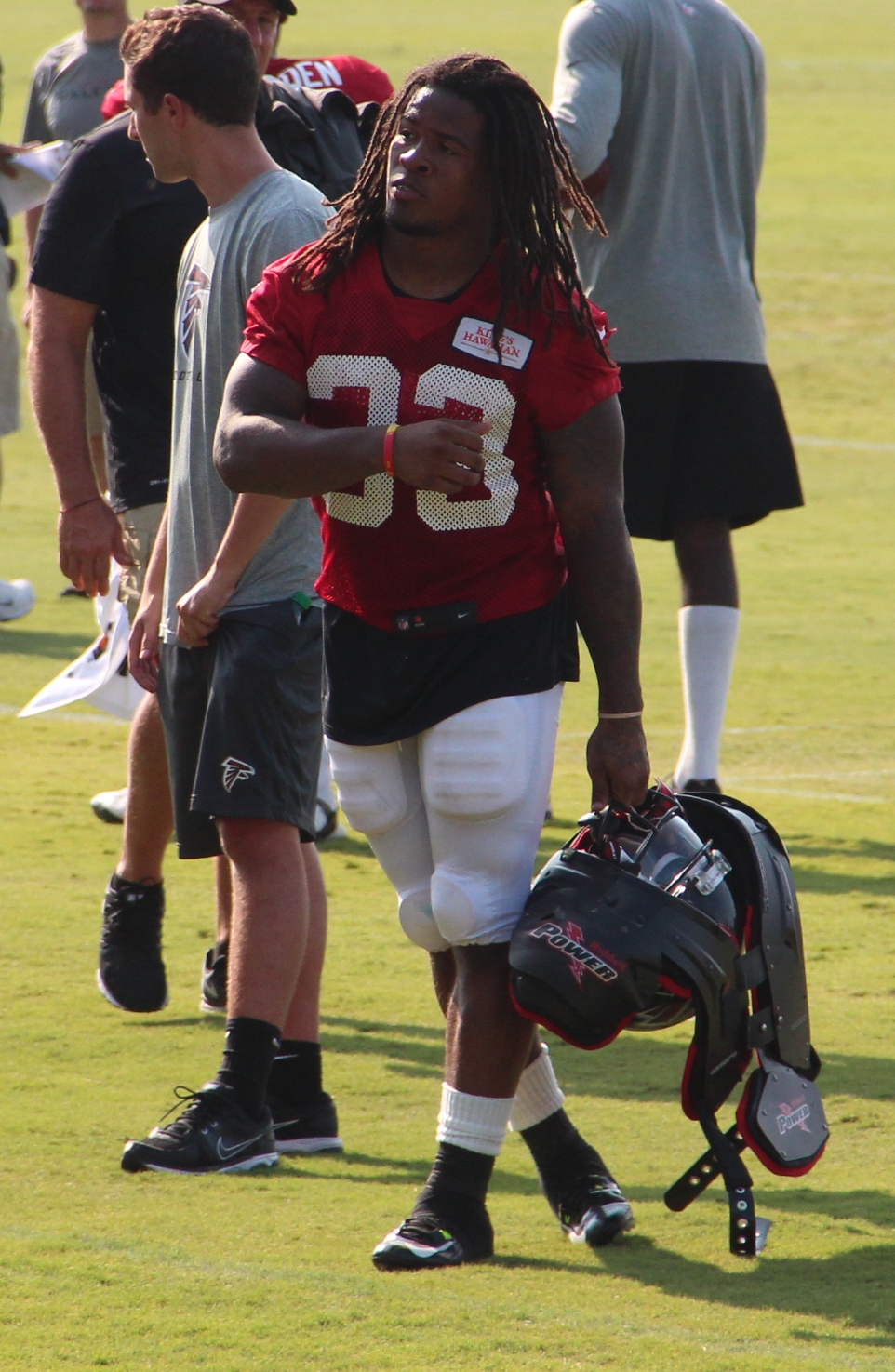
Devonta Freeman won the award in 2012 and 2013.

- 1958: Al Ulmer, Guard
- 1959: Ramon Rogers, Center
- 1960: Abner Bigbie, Fullback
- 1961: Paul Andrews, Fullback
- 1962: Jim Sims, Tackle
- 1963: Larry Brinkley, Fullback
- 1964: Dick Hermann, Linebacker
- 1965: Howard Ehler, Defensive Back
- 1966: Ed Pope, Guard
- 1967: Kim Hammond, Quarterback
- 1968: Billy Gunter, Running Back
- 1969: Stan Walker, Guard
- 1970: Bill Lohse, Linebacker
- 1971: Bill Henson, Defensive Tackle
- 1972: David Snell, Defensive Back
- 1973: Steve Bratton, Defensive End
- 1974: Jeff Gardner, Offensive Guard
- 1975: Lee Nelson, Defensive Back
- 1976: Joe Camps, Defensive Back
- 1977: Aaron Carter, Linebacker
- 1978: Scott Warren, Defensive End
- 1979: Greg Futch, Offensive Tackle
- 1980: Monk Bonasorte, Defensive Back
- 1981: Barry Voltapetti, Offensive Tackle
- 1982: Blair Williams, Quarterback
- 1983: Ken Roe, Linebacker
- 1984: Todd Stroud, Noseguard
- 1985: Pete Panton, Tight End
- 1986: Greg Newell, Free Safety
- 1987: Mark Salva, Center
- 1988: Jason Kuipers, Offensive Guard
- 1989: Tony Yeomans, Offensive Guard
- 1990: Lawrence Dawsey, Wide Receiver
- 1991: Dan Footman, Defensive End
- 1992: Robbie Baker, Center
- 1993: Jon Nance, Noseguard
- 1994: Steve Gilmer, Safety & Enzo Armella, Noseguard
- 1995: Todd Rebol, Linebacker
- 1996: Connell Spain, Defensive Tackle
- 1997: Greg Spires, Defensive End
- 1998: Troy Saunders, Corner Back
- 1999: Reggie Durden, Corner Back
- 2000: Patrick Newton, Linebacker
- 2001: Bradley Jennings, Linebacker
- 2002: Anquan Boldin, Wide Receiver
- 2003: David Castillo, Center
- 2004: Bryant McFadden, Corner Back
- 2005: Andre Fluellen, Defensive Tackle
- 2006: Darius McClure, Safety
- 2007: Anthony Houllis, Rover
- 2008: Ryan McMahon, Center
- 2009: Markus White, Defensive End & Ryan McMahon, Center
- 2010: Andrew Datko, Offensive Tackle
- 2011: EJ Manuel, Quarterback & Lamarcus Joyner, Safety
- 2012: Devonta Freeman, Running Back & Telvin Smith, Linebacker
- 2013: Devonta Freeman, Running Back & Lamarcus Joyner, Safety
- 2014: Josue Matias, Offensive Guard & Eddie Goldman, Defensive Tackle
- 2015: Kareem Are, Offensive Guard & Reggie Northrup, Linebacker
- 2016: Deondre Francois, Quarterback
- 2017: Derrick Kelly II, Offensive Guard
- 2018: Derrick Kelly II, Offensive Guard
- 2019: James Blackman, Quarterback
- 2021: Jordan Wilson, Tight End
- 2022: Mycah Pittman, Wide Receiver & Camren McDonald, Tight End
- 2023: D'Mitri Emmanuel, Offensive Guard & Johnny Wilson, Wide Receiver
- 2024: Lawrance Toafili, Running Back
- 2025: Roydell Williams, Running Back & Randy Pittman, Jr., Tight End
