= Stardust Speed Club =

Inline speed skating team

Stardust Speed Club logo

Stardust Speed Club is an Inline speed skating team based out of Tampa, Florida and Greenacres, Florida. Stardust Speed Team is one of the oldest teams in the USA originating in 1978, started by Bob Trosky in Tampa, Florida. Stardust joined with the West Palm (Green Acres) Team in 1985-1986. The official Stardust Colors are Navy Blue, Baby Blue and White. They are an officially sanctioned team with USA Roller Sports.

== Locations ==
- Tampa, Florida
- Greenacres, Florida

== Coaches ==
- Coach (Tampa) - Sammy Johnson
- Coach (Tampa) - Joe Hanna
- Coach (Tampa) - Roy Paz
- Coach (Greenacres) - Ed Mueller
- Coach (Greenacres) - Ross Vening
- Coach (Tampa) - Eric Licata
