= Kim Hammond =

American football player, lawyer, judge

Kim C. Hammond
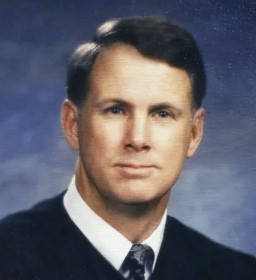
- Judge Kim Hammond

Judge of the Seventh Judicial Circuit of Florida
- In office 1979–2010
- Appointed by: Governor Bob Graham
- Preceded by: Mel Orfinger
- Succeeded by: Raul Zambrano

Personal details
- Born: October 12, 1944 Miami, Florida, U.S.
- Died: June 16, 2017 (aged 72) Ormond Beach, Florida, U.S
- Education: Florida State University (BS)(JD)

Kim Hammond
No. 15
- Position: Quarterback

Personal information
- Listed height: 6 ft 1 in (1.85 m)
- Listed weight: 190 lb (86 kg)

Career information
- High school: Melbourne (Melbourne, Florida)
- College: Florida State (1964–1967)
- NFL draft: 1968: 6th round, 142nd overall pick

Career history
- Miami Dolphins (1968); Boston Patriots (1969); Jacksonville Sharks (1974)

Awards and highlights
- Second-team All-American (1967)

Career NFL statistics
- Passing yards: 147
- Completion percentage: 46.9
- Passer rating: 34.2
- Rushing yards: 1
- Stats at Pro Football Reference

Kim Crane Hammond (October 12, 1944 – July 16, 2017) was an American judge and professional football player. He played as a quarterback in the American Football League (AFL). He played college football for the Florida State Seminoles, quarterbacking the team's first victory over rival Florida in Gainesville, 21–16, and was selected by the Miami Dolphins in the sixth round of the 1968 NFL draft. After his football career, he served as a judge in Flagler County, Florida.

== Early life ==
Hammond was born in Miami, the younger of two sons born to Virginia and William Hammond. His father worked for Pan American Airways as a flight supervisor. The family moved to Melbourne, Florida in 1955. Hammond graduated from Melbourne High School and was an outstanding athlete, lettering in football, basketball and baseball. Hammond was close friends with former US Senator and Administrator of NASA Bill Nelson, whom he called "Billy". On the baseball diamond, Hammond pitched and Nelson caught. They remained close throughout their lives. Hammond attended FSU on a football scholarship.

== College football ==
After a year as a redshirt, then two as backup to Gary Pajcic, Hammond got his first start in his senior year for the second game against Alabama when Pajcic was injured. The Crimson Tide was riding a 21-game winning streak, but Hammond and the Seminoles were ready. FSU had lost in 1965 by the score of 21–0, but FSU turned the tide, embarrassing Bear Bryant when they scored more points than were scored on Alabama the prior year. The game ended in a tie 37-37, but it was probably the Seminoles most impressive game.

Referring to Hammond, Bryant said, “He picked us apart like he was picking a chicken.” FSU lost its next game to North Carolina State 20–10 before winning the remaining 7 regular season games. As a reward for their 7-2-1 season, they were invited to the Gator Bowl in Jacksonville. Hammond played in the 1967 Senior Bowl and was named MVP. He was a second-team All-American quarterback in his senior year and finished fifth in Heisman Trophy voting. FSU coaches and players chose Hammond for the Bob Crenshaw Award in 1967. The Florida State University Hall of Fame inducted him in 1978.

=== Gator Bowl ===
In 1997, Hammond was inducted into the Gator Bowl Hall of Fame for his performance in the 1967 postseason game against Penn State. The Nittany Lions were ranked 10th nationally under second year coach Joe Paterno, and favored by two touchdowns over the upstart Noles. Down 17–0 at halftime, the Seminole defense shut down their opponents and Hammond threw for 362 yards and one touchdown and ran for another as FSU scored 17 unanswered points for a tie. Hammond was named MVP for the game.

=== Senior bowl ===
Hammond was invited to play in the 1968 Senior Bowl where he earned the Most Valuable Player honor.

== Pro football ==
A 6th round selection (142nd overall pick) of the 1968 Common draft, Hammond played two seasons in the American Football League, for the Miami Dolphins and the Boston Patriots, respectively, in 1968 and 1969. Hammond played in six games in his short professional career, completing 15 of 32 passes for 147 total yards, no touchdowns, and two interceptions. He also scored two points on a conversion. Hammond was also on the roster of the World Football League's Jacksonville Sharks in 1974. Hammond did not attempt a pass for the Sharks, and he was sacked twice for a net loss of 15 yards.

== Legal career ==
=== Lawyer ===
Hammond graduated from FSU with a bachelor's degree majoring in Business Management; he immediately enrolled in the FSU College of Law. However, his college deferral had expired, so he chose to join the Florida National Guard rather than serve a year of active military duty in the United States Army Reserve. During the football off-season, he attended classes in 1968 and 1969 with tuition paid from his pro football earnings. Following the 1970 season he retired from football to finish law school. After graduating from law school in 1972 and passing the Florida Bar (number 151399), he and his wife moved to Daytona Beach where he joined the law office of Green and Strasser. During his six years of part-time service in the National Guard was a Military Police officer before his service ended in 1973. A few years later he became a principal in the law firm, Green, Strasser and Hammond.

=== Judge ===
After seven years in private practice he had distinguished himself such that Governor Bob Graham appointed him Circuit Judge for the Seventh Judicial Circuit. He was 35 and one of the youngest judges in Florida. The Seventh Circuit includes Putnam, St. Johns, Volusia and Flagler Counties. In 1980, the population of Putnam and St. Johns counties was about 50K each, with Volusia at 250K. Tiny Flagler county was about 10K, so there was only one judge assigned there. When Judge Melvin Orfinger was appointed to the Florida Fifth District Court of Appeal, Hammond requested the Flagler position. As such, he was responsible for all circuit court cases in Flagler including Criminal law, Civil law and Family law; sometimes all in a day.

He served as a judge for 31 years. He helped establish the Flagler County's first drug court and was the Administrative Judge for Flagler County. His fellow judges elected him Chief Judge of the Seventh Judicial Circuit. The Florida Judicial College is a program required for new Florida judges taught by the state's most experienced appellate and trial court judges. Judge Hammond was a frequent program instructor for many years. The Florida Conference of Circuit Judges elected Judge Hammond as a chairman.

==== Opinions ====
Judge Hammond was highly respected by those he knew, law enforcement, courthouse staff and fellow judges. Upon his retirement in 2011, Chief Judge Raul A. Zambrano stated, “Judge Hammond was a beloved judge in the Seventh Judicial Circuit. He was the ultimate statesman and was revered by his colleagues on the bench. He will be missed – but will always be remembered as a true Seminole.”

==== Music ====
Due to his Scottish heritage, Hammond learned to play the bagpipes. He practiced and played often, especially when longtime employees retired. For their final departure, Hammond would greet them at their desk, bagpipes in hand, and “pipe them out” of the building. The sound of Scotland the Brave was often heard in the halls of the courthouse, a unique tradition.

Kim C. Hammond Judicial Center

=== Kim C. Hammond Justice Center ===
Most of Judge Hammond's career was spent at the Old Flagler County Courthouse, a two-story red brick structure built in 1924. A three-story addition was attached at the rear in 1985, but the main building did not have the technological capacity for the modern legal system. Judge Hammond was instrumental in getting the modern courthouse constructed, and the Kim C. Hammond Justice Center in Bunnell was named in his honor. DJ Designs created the architectural plans. It was completed and opened in 2007 and is situated on a 78-acre campus with the new Flagler Government Services Building. The three-story building uses a typical federal design with an open portico in the front and a promenade lined with palm trees.

== Community service ==
Hammond remained a diehard FSU fan throughout his life, serving the FSU Alumni Association and the Seminole Boosters as a board member. During his time in private practice, he was active in the Rotary Club of Daytona Beach, Boy Scouts, United Way, and the Daytona Beach Community College Foundation. He and his family attended the First Presbyterian Church in Daytona Beach where he was a Deacon and Elder. After becoming a judge, Hammond was also on the board of Florida Special Olympics, was Chairman of Volusia/Flagler Easter Seals and coached football and baseball in youth leagues.

== Family ==
Hammond met his future wife at FSU and married the former Jan Dunn in 1968 at Daytona Beach. The couple raised three children: Paige, Todd and Amanda. They also had eight grandchildren. He especially enjoyed family and their trips to the Blue Ridge Mountains in North Carolina.

Judge Hammond died at age 72, just short of his golden wedding anniversary with Jan. For several years he had suffered from diabetes and the aftereffects from his years playing football.

== See also ==
- List of American Football League players
