= Pierre Garçon =

American football player (born 1986)

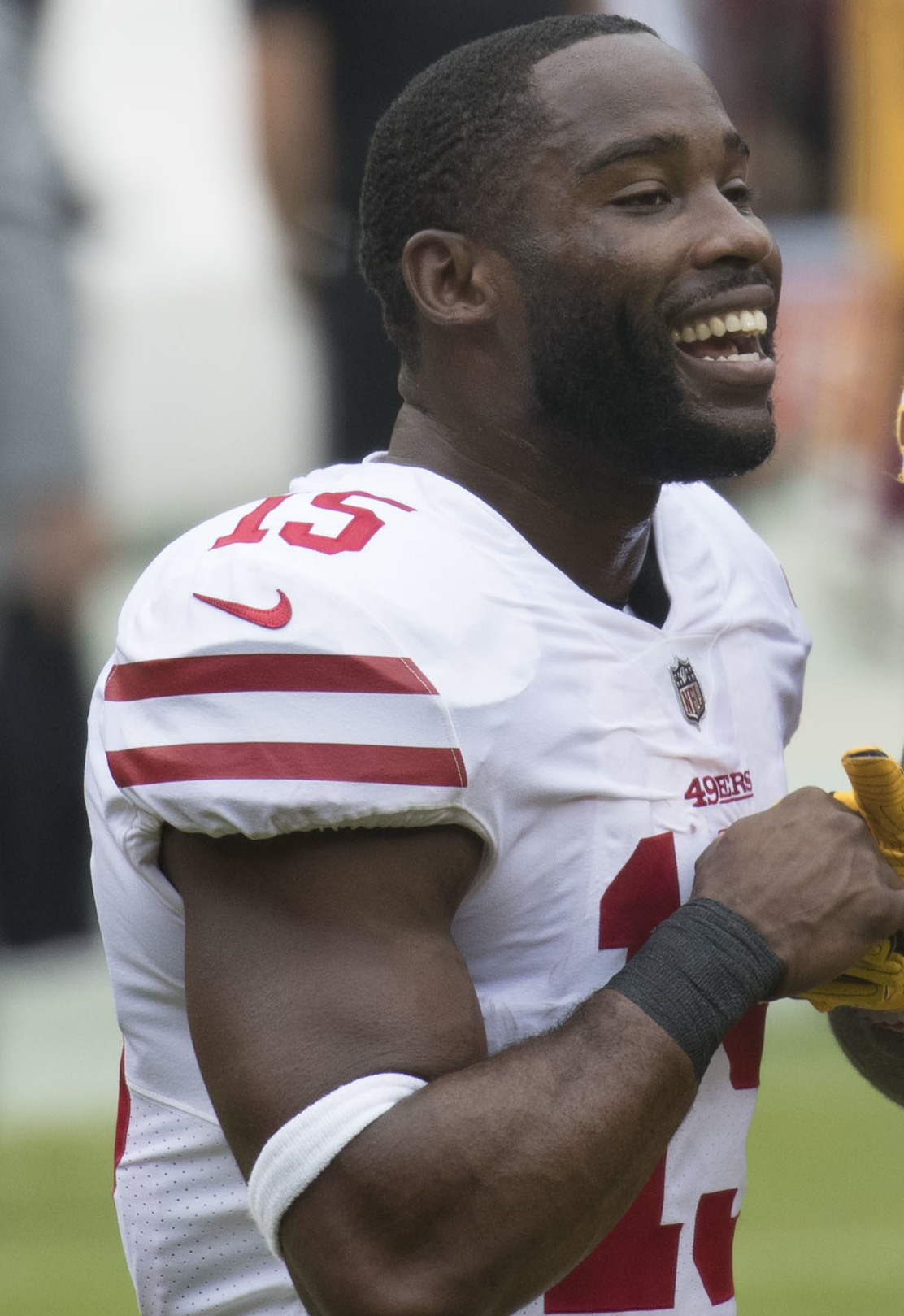
- Garçon with the San Francisco 49ers in 2017

No. 85, 88, 15
- Position: Wide receiver

Personal information
- Born: August 8, 1986 (age 40); Carmel, New York, U.S.
- Listed height: 6 ft 0 in (1.83 m)
- Listed weight: 211 lb (96 kg)

Career information
- High school: John I. Leonard (Greenacres, Florida)
- College: Norwich (2004); Mount Union (2005–2007)
- NFL draft: 2008: 6th round, 205th overall pick

Career history
- Indianapolis Colts (2008–2011); Washington Redskins (2012–2016); San Francisco 49ers (2017–2018)

Awards and highlights
- NFL receptions leader (2013); 2× Division III All-American (2006, 2007); 3× All-OAC (2005–2007)

Career NFL statistics
- Receptions: 628
- Receiving yards: 7,854
- Receiving touchdowns: 38
- Stats at Pro Football Reference

Pierre Andre Garçon (/piˈɛər ɡɑːrˈsoʊn/; born August 8, 1986) is a Haitian-American former professional football player who was a wide receiver in the National Football League (NFL) for 11 seasons. He played college football at Norwich University and Mount Union College, and was selected by the Indianapolis Colts in the sixth round of the 2008 NFL draft. He also played five seasons with the Washington Redskins and two seasons with the San Francisco 49ers.

== Early life ==
Garçon is of Haitian descent, and is bilingual, speaking French fluently. Garçon attended John I. Leonard High School in Greenacres, Florida. He earned two varsity letters in football. He also played soccer, playing for travel teams competing across the state and across the country. He was also known for his backflip after scoring goals.

== College career ==
Garçon started his college career at Norwich University in Northfield, Vermont. As a freshman in 2004, he played in ten games and had 44 receptions for 1,017 yards and 13 touchdowns. Wanting to play in a more football oriented program, he transferred to Mount Union College in the Ohio Athletic Conference. He averaged over 60 catches, 1,000 yards and 15 touchdowns in his career as a Purple Raider. While at Mount Union he led the team to two consecutive NCAA Division III Football Championships, falling just short of a third. During his sophomore season in 2005, he earned Ohio Athletic Conference second-team honors after having 68 receptions for 1,196 yards and 16 touchdowns. As a junior, he was named to the Ohio Athletic Conference first-team and was the recipient of the Ed Sherman Award for the OAC's most outstanding receiver. That season, he was third in the nation with 1,212 receiving yards and had 67 receptions with 17 touchdowns. As a senior in 2007, Garçon was Ohio Athletic Conference first-team and was the recipient of the Ed Sherman Award, for the second time. He had 67 receptions for 955 yards and 14 touchdowns.

During his time at Mount Union, he was teammates with future NFL wide receiver, Cecil Shorts III.

Garçon also ran track at Mount Union, where he recorded personal bests of 10.61 seconds in the 100 meters and 21.69 seconds in the 200 meters.

== Professional career ==
Pre-draft measurables
Height	Weight	Arm length	Hand span	40-yard dash	10-yard split	20-yard split	20-yard shuttle	Three-cone drill	Vertical jump	Broad jump	Bench press
5 ft 11 7/8 in (1.83 m)	210 lb (95 kg)	31 1/8 in (0.79 m)	9 1/2 in (0.24 m)	4.48 s	1.57 s	2.57 s	4.19 s	6.90 s	36.5 in (0.93 m)	10 ft 5 in (3.18 m)	20 reps
All values from NFL Combine

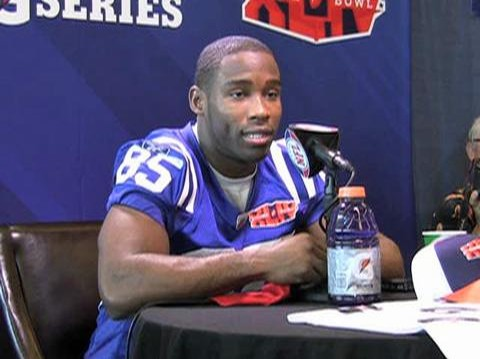
Garçon at Super Bowl XLIV's media day

=== Indianapolis Colts ===
2008 season

Garçon was selected by the Indianapolis Colts in the sixth round of the 2008 NFL draft with the 205th overall pick. In Week 2 against the Minnesota Vikings, he made his NFL debut. Later in Week 10 against the Pittsburgh Steelers, he recorded his first reception. Garçon spent his rookie season as a backup receiver recording only four catches for 23 yards.

2009 season

By the start of the 2009 season, Garçon was made Reggie Wayne's back-up. After Anthony Gonzalez was injured in the first game of the season, he took his place in the starting lineup. In Week 2 against the Miami Dolphins, he had his first career start and recorded his first touchdown. In Week 13 against the Titans, he had six receptions for 136 yards in the victory. He continued to be a starter until a hand injury caused him to miss the last two games of the season. He displayed himself as a deep threat in Peyton Manning's offense, recording 47 receptions, 765 yards, and four touchdowns in his second season.

In the 2009–10 NFL playoffs, the top-seeded Colts defeated the Baltimore Ravens 20–3 in the Divisional Round to advance to the AFC Championship Game against the New York Jets, where Garçon would record 11 catches for 151 yards and a touchdown, being Indianapolis' leading receiver in the 30–17 victory and propelling the Colts to Super Bowl XLIV. In the Super Bowl against the New Orleans Saints, Garçon finished the game with five receptions for 66 yards and a touchdown, a 19-yard-pass from Peyton Manning in the first quarter which gave the Colts an early 10–0 lead, however Indianapolis ultimately lost 31–17.

2010 season

In 2010, Garçon had the starting spot most of the season with the exception for Week 3 and 4, where he was inactive for both games. In Week 6 against the Washington Redskins, he made an impressive one-handed catch. By the end of the season, he had 67 receptions for 784 yards and six touchdowns. In the Colts' Wild Card Round loss to the Jets, he had five receptions for 112 yards and a touchdown.

2011 season

Despite Peyton Manning being out the entire 2011 season due to injury, Garçon had his best season with the Colts. In Week 4 against the Buccaneers, he had two receptions for 146 yards and two touchdowns in the loss. In the following game, he had five receptions for 125 yards and two touchdowns in the loss to the Chiefs. In Week 13 against the Patriots, he had nine receptions for 150 yards and two touchdowns in the loss. He started in all 16 games of the season and recorded 70 receptions, 947 receiving yards, and six touchdowns.

=== Washington Redskins ===
==== 2012 season ====
On March 13, 2012, Garçon signed a five-year $42.5 million, $20.5 million guaranteed, contract with the Washington Redskins. He was the Redskins' first free agent signing for the 2012 season. During the first OTA of the 2012 preseason, Garçon and Brandyn Thompson accidentally collided into coach Mike Shanahan. In the season-opening 40–32 win against the New Orleans Saints, he scored the first touchdown. After catching a 16-yard pass from Robert Griffin III, Garçon ran for an additional 72 yards and a touchdown, which gave Griffin his first career touchdown. Despite not playing for the entire second half of the game due to a foot injury, he finished with 109 yards on four receptions and one touchdown. After missing several games due to the same foot injury, it was confirmed on October 25 that he had a plantar plate tear in the bottom of his right foot. In the Week 12 win against the Dallas Cowboys on Thanksgiving, he would score his second touchdown of the season after catching a 59-yard pass from Griffin III. Garçon finished the season with 44 receptions on 67 targets for 633 yards and four touchdowns.

==== 2013 season ====
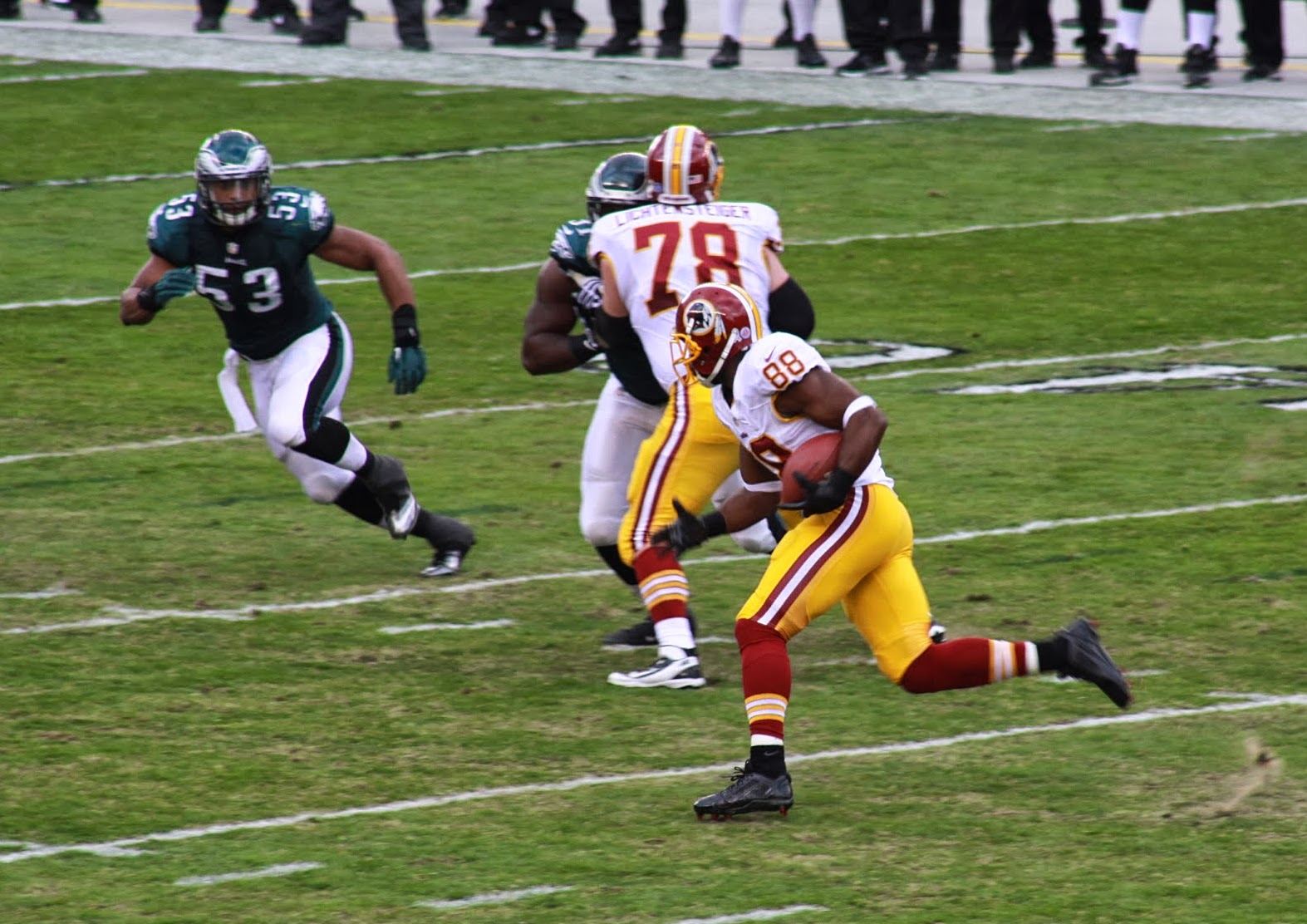
Garçon running an end-around in 2013 against the Philadelphia Eagles.

In Week 2 of the 2013 season, Garçon had eight receptions for 143 yards and a touchdown in a loss to the Packers. In the Week 9 win against the San Diego Chargers, Garçon achieved a new career-high of 172 receiving yards in a single game. During the Week 16 game against the Dallas Cowboys, he broke the Redskins' all-time franchise record for receptions in a single season, previously held by Art Monk with 106 receptions set in 1984, with 107 receptions. At the end of the 2013 season, Garçon extended the record to 113 receptions, as well as finishing with a new career high of 1,346 yards. His 181 targets tied with Andre Johnson for most in the 2013 season. On the NFL Network's Top 100 Players of 2014, Garçon was voted the 80th best player (overall) in the league by his peers.

==== 2014 season ====
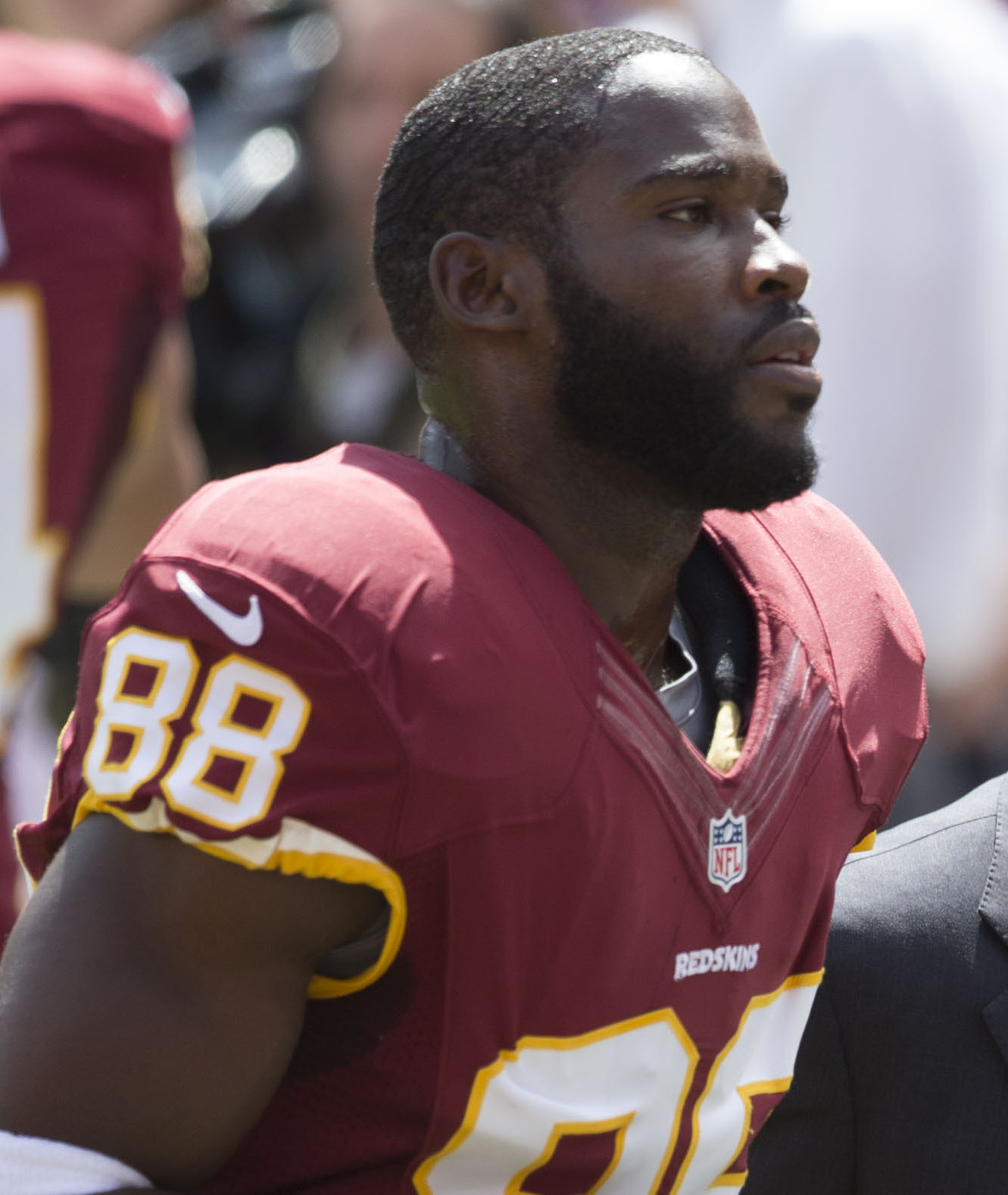
Garçon with the Washington Redskins in September 2015

In Week 3 against the Eagles, Garçon had 11 receptions for 138 yards in the 37–34 loss. In the Week 7 win against the Tennessee Titans, after catching a short pass from quarterback Colt McCoy, Garçon ran the ball in for a 70-yard touchdown. Garçon finished the season with 68 receptions on 105 targets for 752 yards and three touchdowns.

==== 2015 season ====
Garçon opened the 2015 season behind DeSean Jackson with Kirk Cousins as the starting quarterback for the team. After Jackson injured his hamstring in the Week 1 loss against the Miami Dolphins, Garçon moved into the WR1 position and quickly developed a strong trust with Cousins, due to his toughness when being hit along with a knack for finding the ball in traffic. This was evident as Garçon caught the game-winning touchdown in Week 4 against the Philadelphia Eagles, which was caught as he was hit by two defenders. Garçon continued to make tough catches for the team throughout the season, and posted a 60% first-down catch rate in an effort to push the Redskins to the playoffs. In the last three games, Garçon's production increased, catching a touchdown in each of those games, including a 39-yard score in their season finale against the Dallas Cowboys. In the Redskins' postseason matchup against the Green Bay Packers, Garçon posted five receptions for 70 yards in the 35–18 Wild Card Round loss. He finished the season with 77 receptions on 118 targets for 847 yards and 6 touchdowns (including the postseason).

==== 2016 season ====
In a game against the Cleveland Browns on October 2, 2016, Garçon caught his 500th career reception. In Week 11, against the Packers, he had six receptions for 116 yards and a touchdown. Garçon finished the season with 79 receptions on 116 targets for 1,041 yards and three touchdowns.

=== San Francisco 49ers ===
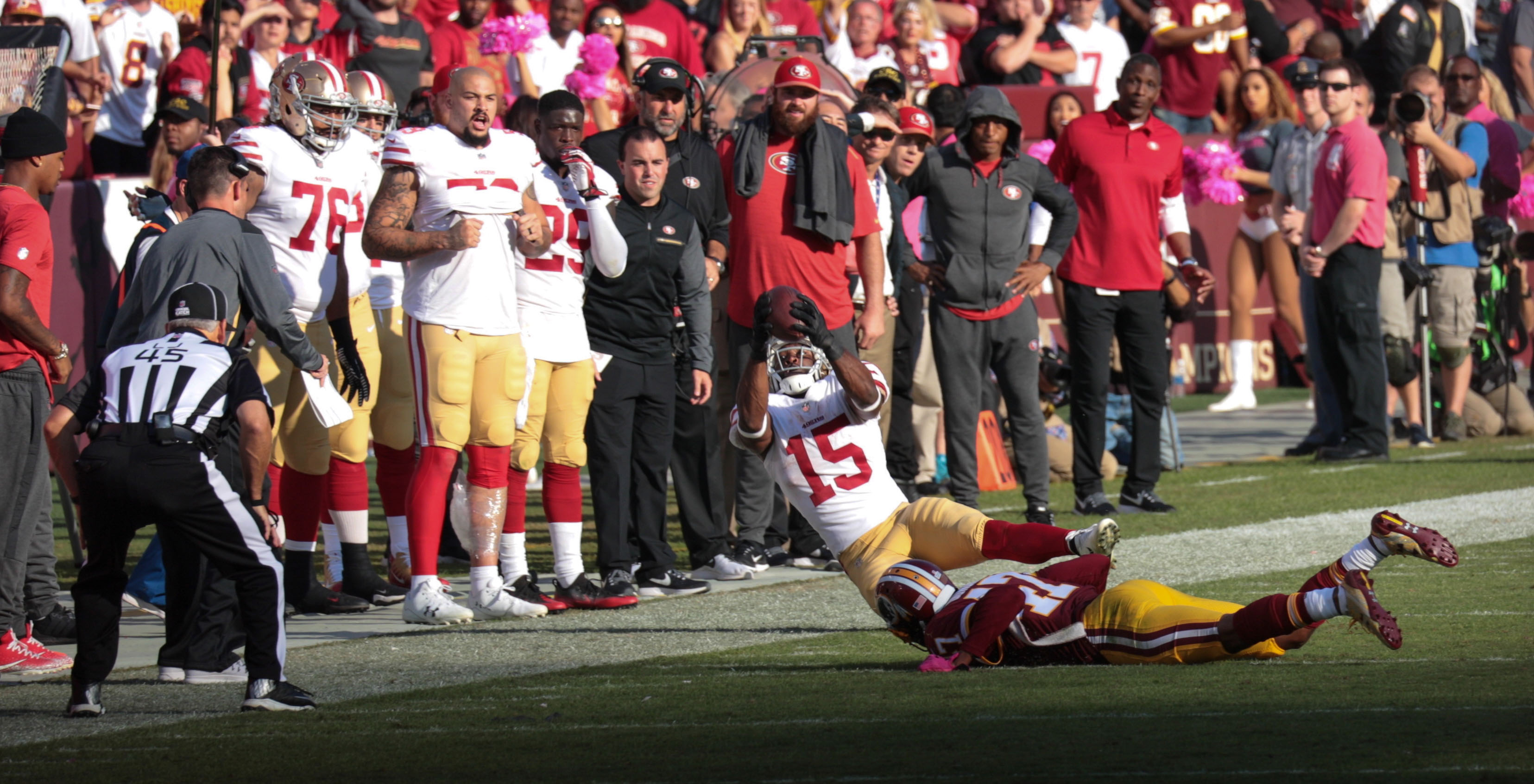
Garçon catching a pass in a game against his former team, the Redskins in 2017.

On March 9, 2017, Garçon signed a five-year, $47.5 million contract with the San Francisco 49ers.

2017 season

On September 10, 2017, in his 49ers debut, Garçon had six receptions for 81 yards in the season opening 23–3 loss to the Carolina Panthers. In Week 3, against the Rams, he had seven receptions for 142 yards in the 41–39 loss. He started the first eight games of the season recording 40 catches for 500 yards before suffering a neck injury. He was placed on injured reserve on November 4, 2017.

On December 11, 2018, Garçon was placed on injured reserve for the second year in a row after undergoing knee surgery. He finished the season with 24 receptions for 286 yards and one touchdown.

On February 14, 2019, the 49ers declined the option on Garçon's contract, making him a free agent at the start of the new league year.

== NFL career statistics ==
Year	Team	Games		Receiving				
Year	Team	GP	GS	Rec	Yds	Avg	Lng	TD
2008	IND	14	0	4	23	5.8	12	0
2009	IND	14	13	47	765	16.3	66	4
2010	IND	14	14	67	784	11.7	57T	6
2011	IND	16	16	70	947	13.5	87T	6
2012	WAS	10	10	44	633	14.4	88T	4
2013	WAS	16	16	113	1,346	11.9	53T	5
2014	WAS	16	14	68	752	11.1	70T	3
2015	WAS	16	16	72	777	10.8	39T	6
2016	WAS	16	16	79	1,041	13.2	70T	3
2017	SF	8	8	40	500	12.5	59	0
2018	SF	8	8	24	286	11.9	25	1
Career		148	131	628	7,854	12.5	88T	38
