= Kenrick Ellis =

Jamaican-born American football player (born 1987)

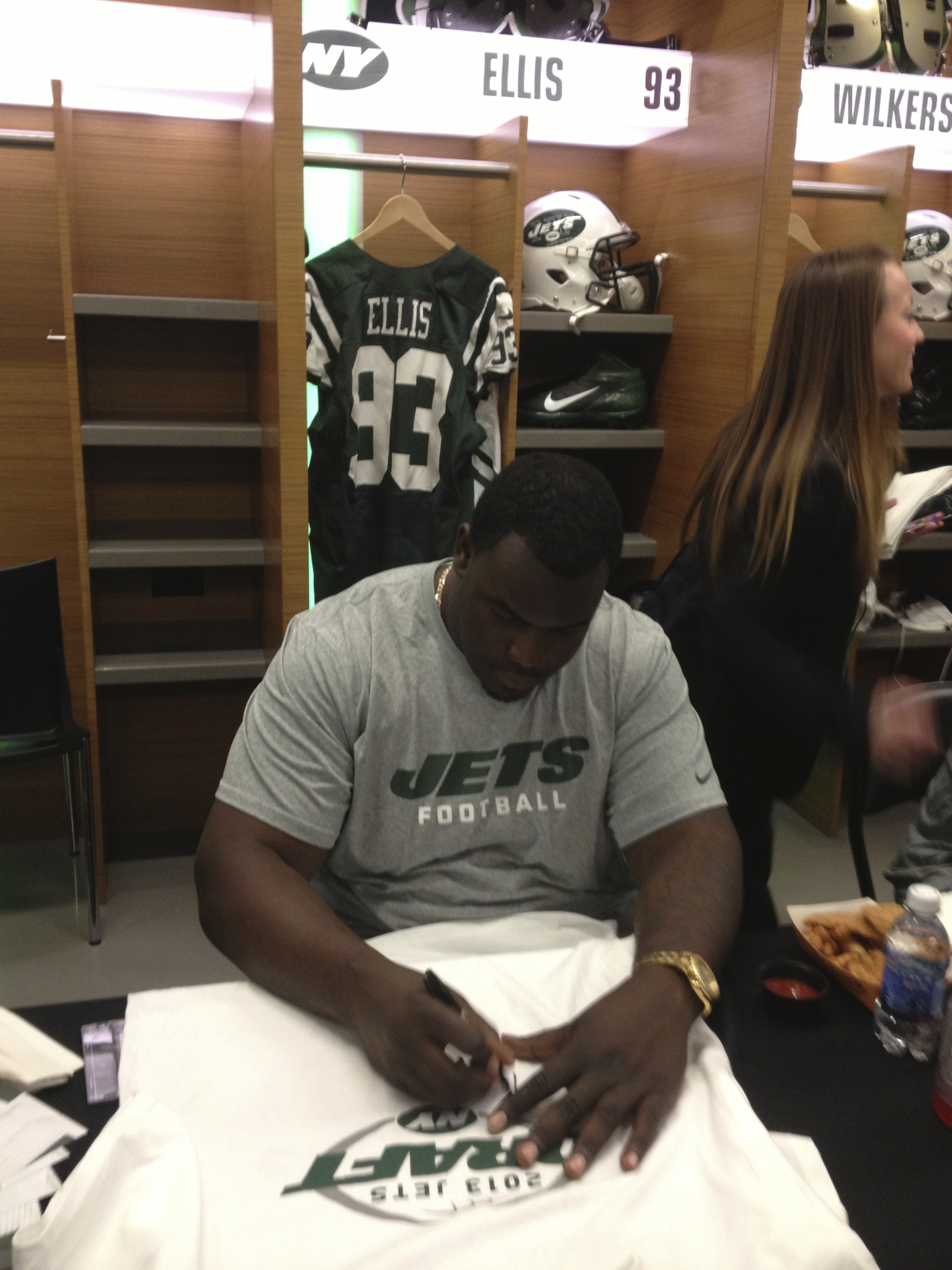
- Ellis signing autographs in the locker room of MetLife Stadium in 2013

No. 72, 93, 97
- Position: Defensive tackle

Personal information
- Born: December 10, 1987 (age 38); Jamaica
- Listed height: 6 ft 5 in (1.96 m)
- Listed weight: 346 lb (157 kg)

Career information
- High school: John I. Leonard (Greenacres, Florida, U.S.)
- College: Hampton
- NFL draft: 2011: 3rd round, 94th overall pick

Career history
- New York Jets (2011−2014); New York Giants (2015); Minnesota Vikings (2015)

Awards and highlights
- First-team All-MEAC (2009); Second-team All-MEAC (2008)

Career NFL statistics
- Total tackles: 58
- Sacks: 1.0
- Forced fumbles: 1
- Stats at Pro Football Reference

Kenrick Ellis (born December 10, 1987) is a Jamaican former professional player of American football who was a defensive tackle in the National Football League (NFL). He was selected by the New York Jets in the third round, 94th overall of the 2011 NFL draft. He played college football at the University of South Carolina and Hampton University.

== Early life ==
After spending the first eleven years of his life in Jamaica, Ellis played mostly soccer until he got near high school. He attended John I. Leonard High School in Greenacres, Florida, where he became an All-State defensive tackle and was teammates with Markus White. In his junior year, he had 72 tackles, 16 for loss, and 14 quarterback sacks, while earning Class 6A third-team all-state honors, according to the Florida Sports Writers Association. As a senior, he made 67 tackles, 10 sacks and blocked two kicks despite having the season cut to only eight games as a result of hurricanes. Recruiting analysts of Scout.com described Ellis as Miami metropolitan area's best defensive tackle prospect since Vince Wilfork. Ellis also starred in track & field at John Leonard; at the 2006 Park Vista Invitational, he won the shot put event with a personal-best throw of 14.66 meters (48'1").

Considered a four-star recruit by Rivals.com, Ellis was tabbed as the No. 12 defensive tackle in the country. He was also recognized as the No. 23 player in the state of Florida. After official visits to Rutgers, Tennessee and South Carolina, Ellis committed to the Gamecocks on January 30, 2006. He also received scholarship offers from Michigan, Michigan State, and North Carolina State.

== College career ==
=== South Carolina ===
Before attending college, Kenrick worked at Skyking fireworks in Florida. After redshirting his initial year at South Carolina, Ellis played in 11 of 12 games for the Gamecocks in 2007, and earned a start in the season finale against Clemson. He recorded 11 tackles overall, including 10 solo stops, and three of those for a loss of yardage. Most of his work came on special teams until the final three games of the season, in which he logged nine of his tackles.

Ellis figured to play a more prominent role in the rotation in 2008, as he entered the spring listed as the number two tackle behind senior Marque Hall. However, he was dismissed from the team for repeated violations of team and university policy in May 2008. He had already been suspended for the fall's first three games for violating the same university unspecified policy in February 2008.

Ellis chose to transfer to Hampton University.

=== Hampton ===
In his first year at Hampton, he played in 11 games for the Pirates while starting in nine. He recorded 39 tackles on the season, including 16 solo tackles, and ranked second on the team with 3.5 sacks. He subsequently earned second-team All-MEAC honors as voted on by the league's head coaches and sports information directors.

As a junior, Ellis was fifth on the team with 51 tackles, and also ranked second on the team with 15.0 tackles for loss on the season. He received first-team All-MEAC honors by the league's coaches.

== Professional career ==
=== Pre-draft ===
Pre-draft measurables
Height	Weight	Arm length	Hand span	Wingspan	40-yard dash	10-yard split	20-yard split	20-yard shuttle	Three-cone drill	Vertical jump	Broad jump	Bench press
6 ft 4 7/8 in (1.95 m)	346 lb (157 kg)	35 1/8 in (0.89 m)	10 1/2 in (0.27 m)	6 ft 11 in (2.11 m)	5.27 s	1.85 s	3.07 s	4.88 s	7.84 s	32 in (0.81 m)	8 ft 6 in (2.59 m)	26 reps
All values from NFL Combine/Pro Day

A two-time All-Mid-Eastern Athletic Conference performer, Ellis was considered one of the best defensive tackle prospects to enter the 2011 NFL Draft. Ellis was ranked by ESPN as the fourth top small-school prospect in the draft.

=== New York Jets ===
Ellis was selected by the New York Jets in the third round with the 94th overall selection in the 2011 NFL Draft. He made his professional debut on October 17, 2011, against the Miami Dolphins. He made his first career start six days later against the San Diego Chargers.

=== New York Giants ===
On March 18, 2015, Ellis signed a one-year deal with the New York Giants. He was released by the Giants on September 5, 2015, to make room on the roster for Louis Nix. On September 22, 2015, he was re-signed by the team. Preston Parker was released to accommodate this transaction. On October 3, 2015, he was released by the Giants.

=== Minnesota Vikings ===
On October 21, 2015, Ellis was signed by the Minnesota Vikings to replace Shamar Stephen, who was placed on the IR list after a season-ending toe injury. He ended up playing in 9 regular season games and 1 playoff game for the Vikings and contributed with 8 tackles (2 solo) as part of a defensive line rotation. In week 8, he was credited with a pressure of Bears quarterback Jay Cutler. His best game of the year came in the regular season-finale against the Green Bay Packers, in which he posted 3 total tackles.

On September 3, 2016, Ellis was released by the Vikings.

== Legal issues ==
In April 2010, while attending Hampton University, Ellis was arrested by University police after allegedly attacking another student, Dennis Eley. Ellis claimed Eley had been harassing his girlfriend and subsequently ran after Ellis with a baseball bat. Ellis faced felony charges and possible deportation to his native Jamaica. A plea agreement was reached on May 17, 2012, and on May 21, 2012, he pleaded guilty to assault and battery, a misdemeanor, and was required to serve 45 days in jail and remain on unsupervised probation for two years. Kenrick Ellis was released from jail July 9, 2012, after serving the first portion of his jail sentence and was allowed to participate in a work release program while in jail, giving him the opportunity to work with Hampton football coaches during his incarceration.
