= Hoffman's Chocolate =

Floridian chocolate manufacturer

Hoffman's Chocolates
- Headquarters: Greenacres, Florida, United States
- Products: Chocolate products
- Parent: BBX Capital Corporation
- Website: https://hoffmans.com/

Hoffman's Chocolates is a manufacturer of chocolates in Florida. The business is based in Greenacres, Florida and includes several retail locations in South Florida.

Hoffman's has been a favorite local brand for residents of Palm Beach County and is especially popular with the substantial Jewish population as a source of Kosher O-U chocolates.

== Overview ==
Established in 1975, Hoffman's is the largest manufacturer of chocolate in Florida. Randall Vitale is the President of Hoffman's Chocolates.

The Hoffman's Chocolates factory was a tourist destination that included a 30 ft observation window of operations.

The company makes elaborate December holiday displays and offers products such as gift baskets and chocolate covered pretzels. Offerings include the "Snoodle" and Pecan Caramel "Jitterbugs."

Hoffman's Chocolates was named one of "America's Best Chocolate Shops" by Bon Appetit magazine and was featured in the Wall Street Journal as having the "best overall Easter basket in the nation" in March 2000.

In 2009, Hoffman's Chocolates acquired Good Fortunes, a made-to-order custom fortune cookie company. In 2010, Hoffman's Chocolate also purchased Boca Bons, a premium wholesale brand that features elaborate packaging. As of 2012, the company has made plans to continue to expand its retail locations throughout the South Florida.

In December 2013, Hoffman's Chocolates was purchased by BBX Capital Corporation.

In March 2025, Hoffman's closed their Greenacres location.
