= Friendship Collegiate Academy Public Charter School =

Friendship Collegiate Academy

Location
- 4095 Minnesota Avenue, NE; Washington, D.C. 20019; United States
- 38.8975°N 76.9463°W

Information
- School type: Public Charter
- Established: 2000
- School board: DC Public Charter School Board
- Oversight: Friendship Public Charter Schools
- Principal: Peggy Jones
- Grades: 9–12
- Enrollment: 1353 (in 2008–09)
- Colors: Navy Blue & Gold
- Nickname: FCA; Collegiate
- Website: http://www.friendshipschools.org/

Friendship Collegiate Academy Public Charter School is a public high school in Washington, D.C. Established in 2000, the school serves students in grades 9–12 and is part of the Friendship Public Charter School network.

== History ==
Friendship Collegiate Academy opened on September 5, 2000.

== Campus ==
Collegiate Academy is located in the former Carter G. Woodson Junior High School, across Minnesota Avenue from the Minnesota Avenue Washington Metro station.

== Curriculum ==
Collegiate Academy offers a comprehensive curriculum including honors and Advanced Placement courses. An Early College program allows students starting in the ninth grade the opportunity to take college courses and earn up to two years of college credit as they complete their diploma. A Career Academy program offers courses in three focus areas: Arts and Communications, Engineering and Technology, and Health and Human Services.

== Extracurricular activities ==
Student groups and activities include art club, choir, community service club, debate club, drama club, Friendship News Network, the Leadership Criminal Justice Program, National Honor Society, robotics team, science club, student government association, world language club, and yearbook.

The Collegiate Academy teams, known as the Knights, compete in girls & boys basketball, baseball, cheer-leading, football, soccer, track and field, and volleyball.

== Notable alumni ==
- Jalen McLeod, NFL football player for the Jacksonville Jaguars
- Dylan Stewart, college football defensive end
- Teez Tabor, former NFL football player
- Yannick Ngakoue, former football NFL player
- Eddie Goldman, NFL football player for the Washington Commanders
- Derwin Gray, CFL football player for the BC Lions
- Christian Braswell, NFL football player
