= John I. Leonard Community High School =

Location
- 4701 10th Avenue; Greenacres, Palm Beach County, Florida 33463; United States; 26°37′50″N 80°06′58″W

Information
- School type: Public school
- Established: 1965
- School district: Palm Beach County
- Principal: Elena Villani
- Teaching staff: 163.00 (FTE)
- Enrollment: 3,278 (2023–2024)
- Student to teacher ratio: 20.11
- Colors: Black and orange
- Nickname: Lancers
- Newspaper: Knight Times
- Website: jilh.palmbeachschools.org

John I. Leonard Community High School is a public high school located in Greenacres, Florida, United States.

== History ==
The school is named after John I. Leonard, who served as the first president of Palm Beach State College (then Palm Beach Junior College) and as Palm Beach County superintendent of public schools from 1936 to 1947.

On August 7, 1964, Melvin J. Adolphson was named as the first principal of the new high school, which opened in 1965.

In January 1994, the school was annexed into the city of Greenacres.

On November 2, 2026, the school was closed following a Learjet crash nearby.

== Notable alumni ==
- Doug Bochtler (class of 1988), former MLB pitcher for the San Diego Padres, Detroit Tigers, LA Dodgers, and KC Royals.
- Kenrick Ellis (class of 2006), former NFL defensive tackle for the New York Jets, New York Giants, and Minnesota Vikings
- Kevin Fagan (class of 1981), former NFL defensive end for the San Francisco 49ers; two-time Super Bowl champion (XXIII and XXIV)
- Pierre Garçon (class of 2004), NFL wide receiver for the Washington Redskins and San Francisco 49ers
- Ryan Hawblitzel (class of 1990), former MLB pitcher for the Colorado Rockies
- Markus White (class of 2006), former NFL defensive end for Tampa Bay Buccaneers, Washington Redskins, and the CFL's Saskatchewan Roughriders
