= Doug Bochtler =

American baseball player and coach (born 1970)

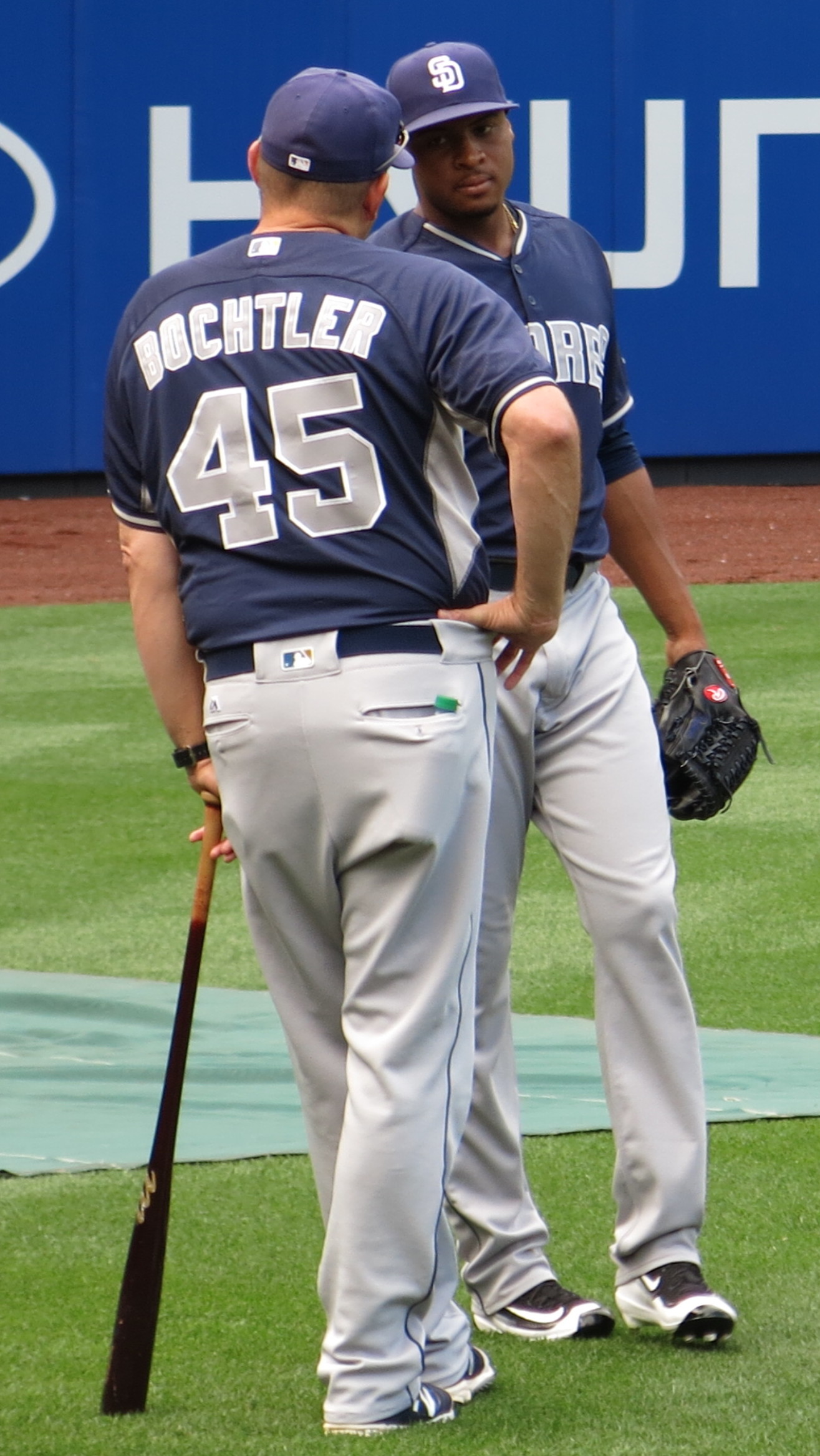
- Bochtler (left) with Luis Perdomo in 2016
- Pitcher
- Born: July 5, 1970 (age 56); West Palm Beach, Florida, U.S.
- Batted: Right Threw: Right

MLB debut
- May 5, 1995, for the San Diego Padres

Last MLB appearance
- July 22, 2000, for the Kansas City Royals

MLB statistics
- Win–loss record: 9–18
- Earned run average: 4.57
- Strikeouts: 215
- Stats at Baseball Reference

Teams
- San Diego Padres (1995–1997); Detroit Tigers (1998); Los Angeles Dodgers (1999); Kansas City Royals (2000)

Douglas Eugene Bochtler (born July 5, 1970) is an American former professional baseball pitcher in Major League Baseball (MLB) from 1995 to 2000.

== Amateur career ==
Bochtler attended John I. Leonard High School in Lake Worth, Florida and graduated in 1988. He played baseball at Leonard with fellow future Major League pitchers Ryan Hawblitzel and Kevin Ohme. He spent a season playing college baseball at Indian River Community College in Fort Pierce, Florida before being selected by the Montreal Expos in the ninth round of the 1989 Major League Baseball draft.

== Professional career ==
Bochtler was assigned to the Gulf Coast League to begin his professional career. He spent three seasons in the Expos farm system before being selected by the Colorado Rockies in the 1992 Major League Baseball expansion draft. On July 26, 1993, Bochtler was traded to the San Diego Padres along with Brad Ausmus and a player to be named later for Greg W. Harris and Bruce Hurst.

Bochtler made his Major League debut on May 5, 1995, at Jack Murphy Stadium against the San Francisco Giants; he recorded four outs in relief of Fernando Valenzuela without allowing a run. He recorded the first save of his Major League career on September 13 of the same season in two perfect innings against the Pittsburgh Pirates at Three Rivers Stadium. Bochtler was a regular member of the San Diego bullpen over the following two seasons. In 1996, he served as the primary setup man to closer Trevor Hoffman. During his time in San Diego, he helped Hoffman develop the changeup which would shape his Hall of Fame career.

Following the 1997 season, Bocthler was traded to the Oakland Athletics along with Jorge Velandia for David Newhan and Don Wengert. On March 25, 1998, the Athletics traded Bochtler to the Detroit Tigers for cash. Bochtler led the Tigers in innings pitched in relief in 1998. On September 14 of that season, Bochtler was one of 18 pitchers used in a game against the Chicago White Sox, tying a Major League record.

On April 2, 1999, Bochtler signed a minor league contract with the Toronto Blue Jays. He later joined the Los Angeles Dodgers and appeared in only twelve games at the Major League level. He spent the majority of the season at Triple-A.

The 2000 season was Bochtler's final as a Major League player. He appeared in six games for the Kansas City Royals. His final game came on July 22, 2000. Bochtler began the 2001 season in the Kansas City farm system but later joined the Minnesota Twins organization.

He was the oldest player to pitch for the Edmonton Trappers in 2001 and his experience was valuable to the younger players. He returned to Edmonton in 2002 where he would play with Johan Santana, then a struggling young player who had failed to find success at the Major League level. According to Bochtler, in their time at Edmonton, he taught Santana the changeup which would help him win multiple Cy Young Awards.

Bochtler signed a contract with the Florida Marlins on December 12, 2002. His 2003 season with the Albuquerque Isotopes would be his final as a professional baseball player.

== Coaching Career ==
Bochtler was inspired by his experiences with the Edmonton Trappers to venture into coaching after his playing career ended. In December 2010, he was hired by the Arizona Diamondbacks as a minor league pitching coach for the Yakima Bears. In 2013 and 2014, he coached for the Missoula Osprey and South Bend Silver Hawks respectively. In 2015, he served as the pitching coach for the Kane County Cougars.

The following offseason, he was named the major league bullpen coach for the Padres. Bochtler was replaced by coach Ben Fritz on the San Diego staff when new manager Jayce Tingler was hired following the 2019 season.

He was named the pitching coach of the Detroit Tigers' Triple-A Toledo Mud Hens prior to the 2021 season. Bochtler was added to the Tigers major league coaching staff temporarily at the start of the 2021 season when Detroit pitching coach Chris Fetter tested positive for COVID-19. In 2022, he returned to Triple-A Toledo as pitching coach, a role he currently holds.

== Personal life ==
Bochtler did not drink alcohol during his Major League career because he felt he needed whatever competitive advantage his teetotalism might offer. In March 2001, Bochtler learned that his wife had been diagnosed with skin cancer. As of June 2010, Bochtler was a member of the Fellowship of Christian Athletes.
