= Yannick Ngakoue =

American football player (born 1995)

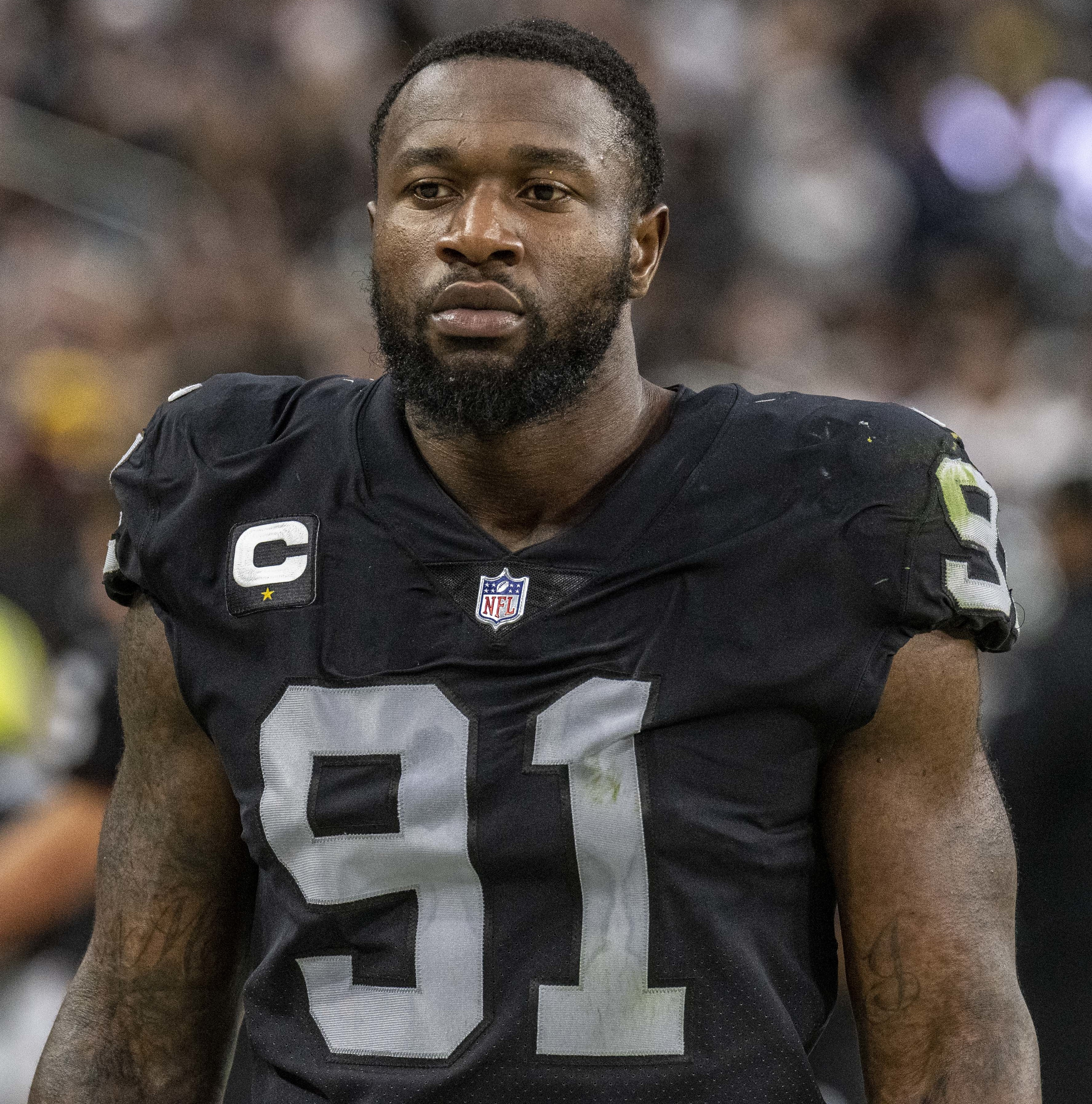
- Ngakoue with the Las Vegas Raiders in 2021

Profile
- Position: Linebacker

Personal information
- Born: March 31, 1995 (age 31); Washington, D.C., U.S.
- Listed height: 6 ft 2 in (1.88 m)
- Listed weight: 246 lb (112 kg)

Career information
- High school: Friendship Collegiate Academy (Washington, D.C.)
- College: Maryland (2013–2015)
- NFL draft: 2016: 3rd round, 69th overall pick

Career history
- Jacksonville Jaguars (2016–2019); Minnesota Vikings (2020); Baltimore Ravens (2020); Las Vegas Raiders (2021); Indianapolis Colts (2022); Chicago Bears (2023); Baltimore Ravens (2024); New England Patriots (2024)

Awards and highlights
- Pro Bowl (2017); NFL forced fumbles leader (2017); PFWA All-Rookie Team (2016); First-team All-Big Ten (2015)

Career NFL statistics
- Total tackles: 238
- Sacks: 70.5
- Forced fumbles: 21
- Fumble recoveries: 3
- Pass deflections: 13
- Interceptions: 2
- Defensive touchdowns: 2
- Stats at Pro Football Reference

Yannick Ngakoue (/jɑːˈniːk nˈɡɑːkweɪ/ yah-NEEK n-GAH-kway; born March 31, 1995) is an American professional football linebacker of the National Football League (NFL). He played college football for the Maryland Terrapins and was selected by the Jacksonville Jaguars in the third round of the 2016 NFL draft. He spent two stints with the Baltimore Ravens and has also played one season each for the Minnesota Vikings, Las Vegas Raiders, Indianapolis Colts, and Chicago Bears.

== Early life ==
Ngakoue was born in Washington, D.C. to a Cameroonian father and Martiniquais mother. He attended Friendship Collegiate Academy Public Charter School in Washington, D.C., where he was teammates with Eddie Goldman. As a senior, he was the Gatorade Football Player of the Year for Washington D.C. after recording 17 sacks. Ngakoue was rated by Rivals.com as a four-star recruit and was ranked as the fourth best outside linebacker in his class. He committed to the University of Maryland, College Park to play college football.

== College career ==
As a true freshman at Maryland in 2013, Ngakoue played in all 13 games and had nine tackles, two sacks and an interception. As a sophomore in 2014, he started all 12 games and recorded 37 tackles and six sacks. As a junior in 2015, Ngakoue set a school record with 13.5 sacks. After the season, he announced that he would forgo his senior season and enter the 2016 NFL draft.

== Professional career ==
Pre-draft measurables
Height	Weight	Arm length	Hand span	40-yard dash	10-yard split	20-yard split	20-yard shuttle	Three-cone drill	Vertical jump	Broad jump	Bench press
6 ft 2 in (1.88 m)	252 lb (114 kg)	32 1/2 in (0.83 m)	9 1/2 in (0.24 m)	4.75 s	1.64 s	2.77 s	4.50 s	7.35 s	34 1/2 in (0.88 m)	9 ft 10 in (3.00 m)	26 reps
All values from NFL Combine

=== Jacksonville Jaguars ===
==== 2016 season ====
The Jacksonville Jaguars selected Ngakoue in the third round (69th overall) in the 2016 NFL draft. He was the seventh defensive end selected. On June 22, 2016, the Jaguars signed Ngakoue to a four-year, $3.48 million contract that included a signing bonus of $856,176. Throughout training camp, he competed for the starting defensive end position against Dante Fowler, Chris Smith, and Jared Odrick. Head coach Gus Bradley named him the backup defensive end behind starters Fowler and Odrick to begin his rookie season.

Ngakoue made his NFL debut in the Jaguars' season-opener against the Green Bay Packers and made two combined tackles during their 27–23 loss. The following week, he earned his first NFL start, as the Jaguars opted to start him at right defensive end over Dante Fowler, and recorded three combined tackles, forced the first fumble of his career, and made his first NFL sack on Philip Rivers in the Jaguars' 38–14 loss at the San Diego Chargers. His first NFL forced fumble came in the second quarter, as he had a strip sack on Rivers. The ball was recovered by Jaguars' safety Johnathan Cyprien. On October 2, Ngakoue made a season-high four solo tackles and recorded his first NFL interception on quarterback Andrew Luck after the pass was deflected by defensive end Dante Fowler during a 30–27 victory over the Indianapolis Colts. In the season finale on January 1, 2017, he collected two solo tackles and made his eighth career sack on Luck in a 24–20 loss to the Colts.

Ngakoue finished his rookie year with 22 combined tackles (19 solo), eight sacks, two pass deflections, an interception, and a forced fumble in 16 games and 15 starts. His eight sacks broke a Jaguars rookie record, previously held by Tony Brackens, but Ngakoue's record was broken by Josh Allen three years later in 2019. Following his rookie season, Ngakoue was named to the PFWA All-Rookie Team. The Jaguars finished the 2016 season 3–13 and head coach Gus Bradley was fired after Week 15 and offensive line coach Doug Marrone served as the interim head coach for Weeks 16–17.

==== 2017 season ====
Ngakoue entered training camp competing to maintain his starting defensive end role against newly acquired free agent Calais Campbell and Dante Fowler. Marrone opted to maintain the Gus Bradley's staff and keep defensive coordinator Todd Wash and his base 4–3 defense. Ngakoue was named the starting left defensive end, opposite Calais Campbell, to start the 2017 season.

Ngakoue started in the season-opener against the Houston Texans and recorded four combined tackles, two sacks, two forced fumbles, and a fumble recovery during a 29–7 road victory. His first forced fumble came in the second quarter and was on quarterback Tom Savage and was recovered by teammate Abry Jones, which set the Jaguars up for a touchdown scoring drive. Toward the end of the second quarter, he had another strip-sack on Savage that was recovered and returned by Dante Fowler Jr. for a 53-yard touchdown. Toward the end of the third quarter, he recovered a fumble by quarterback Deshaun Watson that was caused by Fowler. During Week 7, Ngakoue made four combined tackles and a season-high 2.5 sacks during the Jaguars' 27–0 road routing of the Colts. During a Week 11 matchup at the Cleveland Browns, he made three combined tackles and 2.5 sacks in a 19–7 victory. During Week 16 against San Francisco 49ers, Ngakoue collected two solo tackles and made his 12th sack of the season on quarterback Jimmy Garoppolo in the 44–33 road loss. In the next game against the Tennessee Titans, he scored his first NFL touchdown on a 67-yard fumble recovery as the Jaguars lost on the road by a score of 15–10.

Ngakoue finished the season with 30 combined tackles (24 solo) and 12 sacks in 16 games and starts as the Jaguars finished atop the AFC South with a 10–6 record. The Jaguars' defensive line became dominant throughout the season with the key additions of Calais Campbell (during free agency) and Marcell Dareus (a midseason trade acquisition). They adopted the nickname "Sacksonville" throughout the season. His 12 sacks tied for eighth in the league and was second on the team behind Campbell's 14.5 sacks. He also had a league-leading six forced fumbles.

In the playoffs, Ngakoue recorded four tackles, a pass deflection, and a sack before the Jaguars lost to the New England Patriots in the AFC Championship Game by a score of 24–20. On January 22, 2018, he was named to his first Pro Bowl as an injury replacement for teammate Campbell. Ngakoue was ranked 88th by his peers on the NFL Top 100 Players of 2018.

==== 2018 season ====
In week 4 against the New York Jets, Ngakoue recorded his first sack of the season on rookie quarterback Sam Darnold during the 31–12 win. In week 6 against the Dallas Cowboys, Ngakoue sacked Dak Prescott twice during the 40–7 loss. In week 8 against the Philadelphia Eagles in London, Ngakoue sacked Carson Wentz once during the 24–18 loss. In week 17 against the Texans, Ngakoue recorded a season high 5 tackles and sacked Deshaun Watson 1.5 times during the 20–3 loss.

Ngakoue finished the season with 9.5 sacks, 28 total tackles, 33 quarterback hits, and a pass defended. The Jaguars did not retain their overall success from the previous season, this time finishing with a 5–11 record.

==== 2019 season ====
In week 5 against the Carolina Panthers, Ngakoue recorded his first two sacks of the season on Kyle Allen during the 34–27 loss. In week 7 against the Cincinnati Bengals, Ngakoue intercepted a pass thrown by Andy Dalton and returned it 23 yards for a touchdown during the 27–17 win. This was Ngakoue's first career interception and touchdown in the NFL. In the following week's game against the Jets, Ngakoue sacked Sam Darnold twice during the 29–15 win. In week 11 against the Titans, Ngakoue recorded a strip sack on Ryan Tannehill and recovered the football during the 42–20 loss. In week 15 against the Oakland Raiders, Ngakoue sacked Derek Carr twice during the 20–16 win.

Ngakoue finished the season with 8 sacks, 41 total tackles, 15 quarterback hits, four forced fumbles, a fumble recovery, six passes defensed, and an interception returned for a touchdown. The Jaguars slightly improved from the previous season, this time finishing with a 6–10 record.

==== 2020 season ====
On March 2, 2020, Ngakoue went on Twitter to state that he wished to be traded and would not play for the Jaguars in the future.

Despite Ngakoue's request, the Jaguars placed the franchise tag on Ngakoue on March 13, 2020. On April 20, 2020, Ngakoue got in a lengthy Twitter argument with Tony Khan, the team owner's son, because the Jaguars would not trade him. During their argument, Ngakoue most notably told Khan "just trade me."

=== Minnesota Vikings ===
On August 31, 2020, Ngakoue was traded to the Minnesota Vikings for a 2021 second-round selection (Walker Little was later selected) and a conditional fifth-round selection (that would have become a 4th round selection if Ngakoue made the 2021 Pro Bowl or a third if the aforementioned condition was met and the Vikings won Super Bowl LV, but neither condition was met).

In Week 2 against the Colts, Ngakoue recorded his first sack as a Viking on Philip Rivers during the 28–11 loss. In Week 4 against the Texans, Ngakoue sacked Deshaun Watson twice during the 31–23 win.

=== Baltimore Ravens (first stint) ===
On October 22, 2020, Ngakoue was traded to the Baltimore Ravens for a 2021 third-round pick and a 2022 conditional fifth-round pick (which would have become a fourth-round selection if Ngakoue was named first-ballot selection to the 2021 Pro Bowl but it was not met). The move reunited Ngakoue with former Jaguars teammate Calais Campbell. In Week 11 against the Titans, Ngakoue recorded his first sack as a Raven on Ryan Tannehill during the 30–24 overtime loss.

In Week 15 against his former team the Jaguars, Ngakoue recorded two sacks on former teammate Gardner Minshew, including a strip sack that was recovered by the Ravens, during the 40–14 win.

=== Las Vegas Raiders ===
On March 19, 2021, Ngakoue signed a two-year, $26 million contract with the Las Vegas Raiders.

In Week 7, Ngakoue had four tackles, two sacks, and two passes defensed in a 33–22 win over the Philadelphia Eagles, earning AFC Defensive Player of the Week.

Ngakoue led the Raiders in sacks in 2021, and had his first double-digit sack season since 2017.

=== Indianapolis Colts ===
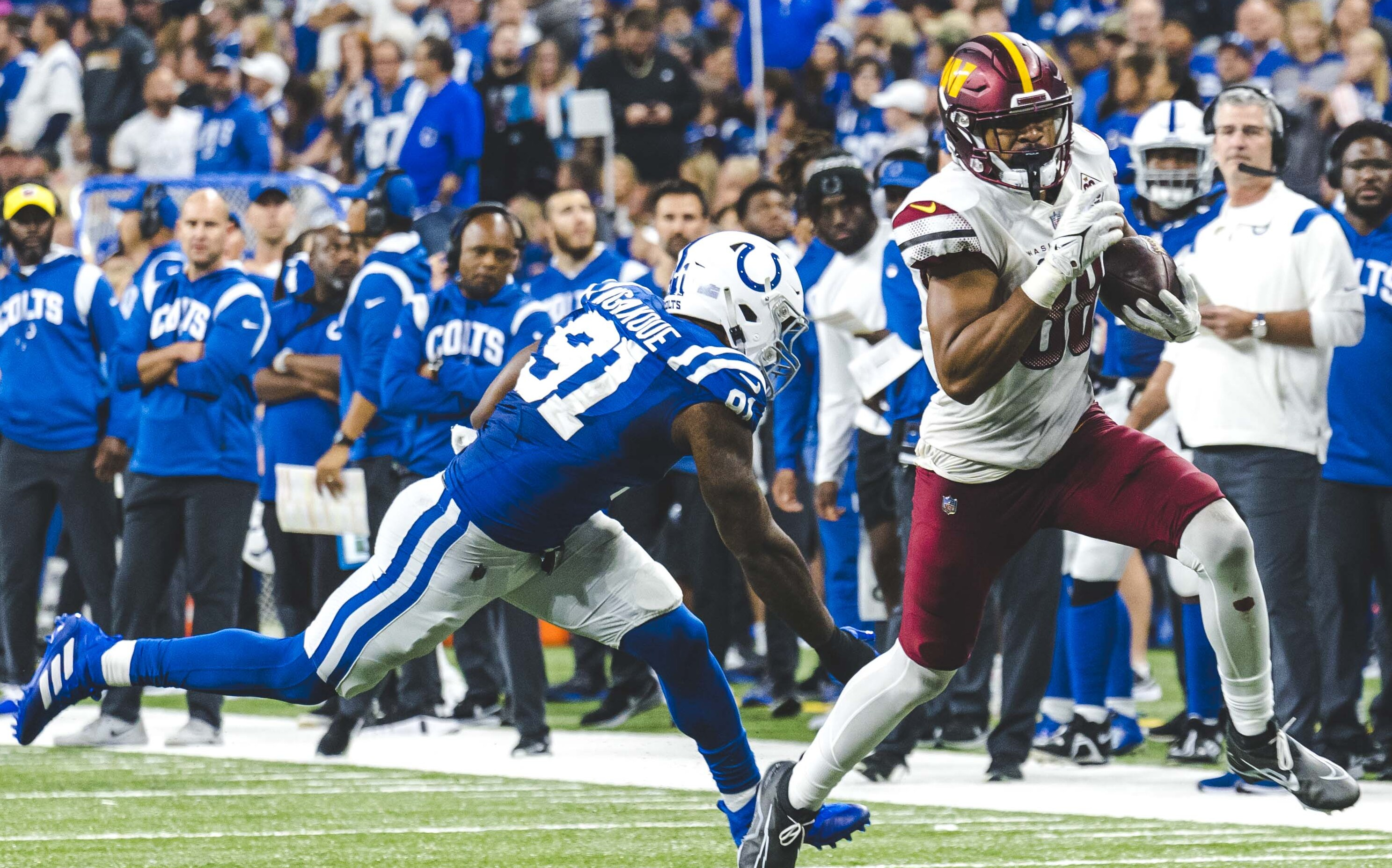
Ngakoue playing for the Colts in 2022.

On March 16, 2022, Ngakoue was traded to the Colts in exchange for cornerback Rock Ya-Sin after the Raiders signed Chandler Jones. He started 15 games in 2022, recording 29 tackles, a forced fumble, and a team-leading 9.5 sacks. He was placed on injured reserve with a throat injury on December 31, 2022.

=== Chicago Bears ===
On August 3, 2023, Ngakoue signed with the Chicago Bears on a one-year, $10.5 million deal. He started 13 games before suffering a broken ankle in Week 14, ending his season. He finished the 2023 season with four sacks and 22 total tackles (13 solo) in 13 games.

=== Baltimore Ravens (second stint) ===
On September 24, 2024, Ngakoue signed with the Baltimore Ravens practice squad. He was elevated to the active roster for the Week 6 matchup against the Washington Commanders. He recorded a sack of Jayden Daniels in the 30–23 win. He was signed to the active roster on October 15. Ngakoue was waived on November 7.

=== New England Patriots ===
On November 8, 2024, Ngakoue was claimed off waivers by the New England Patriots. On December 31, 2024, Ngakoue was released. In the 2024 season, he finished with 1.5 sacks and 14 total tackles (five solo) in 11 games with both the Ravens and Patriots.

== NFL career statistics ==
Legend
	Led the league
**Bold**	Career high

=== Regular season ===
Year	Team	Games		Tackles				Interceptions						Fumbles			
Year	Team	GP	GS	Cmb	Solo	Ast	Sck	PD	Int	Yds	Avg	Lng	TD	FF	FR	Yds	TD
2016	JAX	16	15	23	20	3	8.0	2	**1**	9	9.0	9	0	4	0	0	0
2017	JAX	16	16	30	24	6	**12.0**	0	0	0	0.0	0	0	**6**	**2**	**67**	**1**
2018	JAX	16	16	28	25	3	9.5	1	0	0	0.0	0	0	0	0	0	0
2019	JAX	15	15	**41**	**36**	5	8.0	**6**	**1**	**23**	**23.0**	**23T**	**1**	4	1	–2	0
2020	MIN	6	5	12	12	0	5.0	0	0	0	0.0	0	0	2	0	0	0
2020	BAL	9	3	11	11	0	3.0	1	0	0	0.0	0	0	2	0	0	0
2021	LV	17	17	28	17	**11**	10.0	3	0	0	0.0	0	0	2	0	0	0
2022	IND	15	15	29	18	**11**	9.5	0	0	0	0.0	0	0	1	0	0	0
2023	CHI	13	13	22	13	9	4.0	0	0	0	0.0	0	0	0	0	0	0
2024	BAL	5	0	5	1	4	1.5	0	0	0	0.0	0	0	0	0	0	0
2024	NE	6	0	9	4	5	0.0	0	0	0	0.0	0	0	0	0	0	0
Career		134	115	238	181	57	70.5	13	2	32	16.0	23T	1	21	3	65	1

=== Postseason ===
Year	Team	Games		Tackles				Interceptions						Fumbles			
Year	Team	GP	GS	Cmb	Solo	Ast	Sck	PD	Int	Yds	Avg	Lng	TD	FF	FR	Yds	TD
2017	JAX	3	3	**4**	**3**	**1**	**1.0**	**1**	0	0	0.0	0	0	**1**	0	0	0
2020	BAL	2	1	0	0	0	0.0	0	0	0	0.0	0	0	0	0	0	0
2021	LV	1	1	1	0	1	0.0	0	0	0	0.0	0	0	0	0	0	0
Total		6	5	5	3	12	1.0	1	0	0	0.0	0	0	1	0	0	0
