= Christian Braswell =

American football player (born 1999)

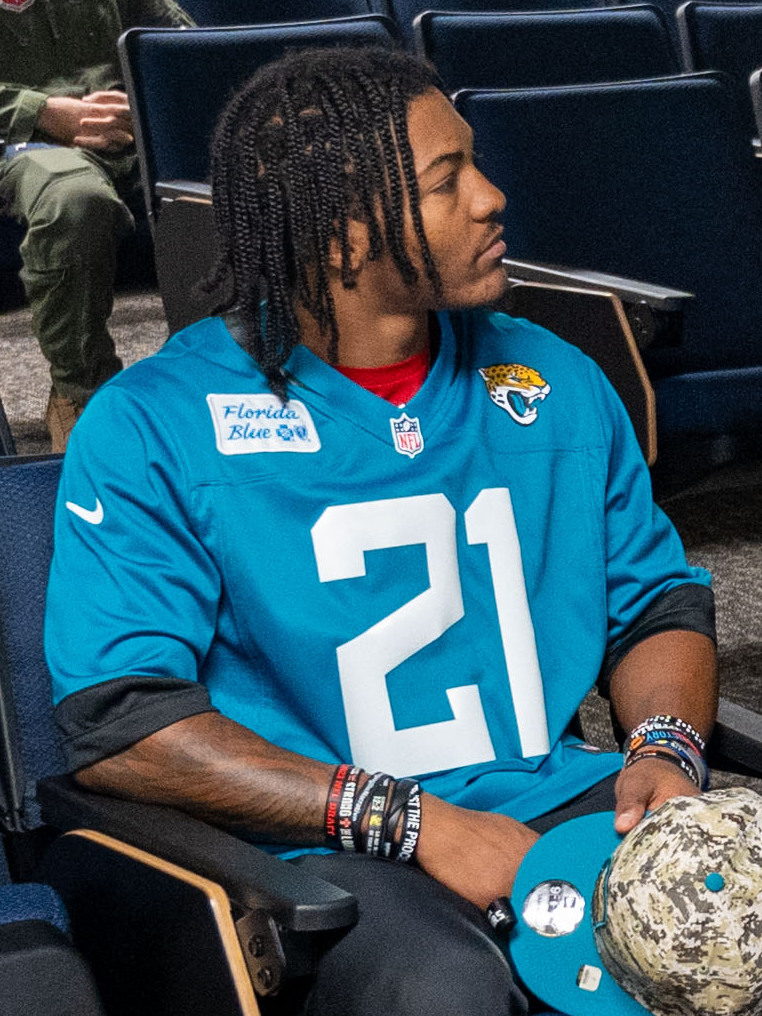
- Braswell in 2023

No. 21 – Philadelphia Eagles
- Position: Cornerback
- Roster status: Practice squad

Personal information
- Born: September 27, 1999 (age 27); Washington, D.C., U.S.
- Listed height: 5 ft 11 in (1.80 m)
- Listed weight: 185 lb (84 kg)

Career information
- High school: Friendship College Academy (Washington, D.C.)
- College: Temple (2017–2020); Rutgers (2021–2022)
- NFL draft: 2023: 6th round, 202nd overall pick

Career history
- Jacksonville Jaguars (2023–2026); Philadelphia Eagles (2026–present)*
- * Offseason or practice squad member only

Career NFL statistics as of Week 18, 2025
- Total tackles: 19
- Pass deflections: 3
- Stats at Pro Football Reference

Christian Braswell (born September 27, 1999) is an American professional football cornerback for the Philadelphia Eagles of the National Football League (NFL). He played college football for the Temple Owls and Rutgers Scarlet Knights.

== Early life ==
Braswell was born on September 27, 1999 to Mia Hayes, and grew up in Washington, D.C. He attended Friendship Collegiate Academy and was a two-way player, as a cornerback and wide receiver. He helped the team win the DCSAA championship and was named first-team All-USA D.C. Braswell committed to play college football at Temple.

== College career ==
As a true freshman at Temple in 2017, Braswell redshirted. He posted 11 tackles in 12 games the following year, before earning a starting role in 2019. With Temple in 2019, Braswell recorded 29 tackles and 10 pass breakups. In the COVID-19-shortened 2020 season, he amassed 21 tackles with two pass breakups, two forced fumbles and an interception.

Braswell transferred to Rutgers in 2021 but missed the entire season as a result of a knee injury. In 2022, he appeared in all 12 games, five of which he started, and was the Rutgers team leader with 11 pass breakups, additionally posting three interceptions and 36 tackles. He was chosen second-team All-Big Ten by Pro Football Focus (PFF) and named an honorable mention by the media.

== Professional career ==
Pre-draft measurables
Height	Weight	Arm length	Hand span	Wingspan	40-yard dash	10-yard split	20-yard split	20-yard shuttle	Three-cone drill	Vertical jump	Broad jump
5 ft 10 1/2 in (1.79 m)	181 lb (82 kg)	30 1/8 in (0.77 m)	9 in (0.23 m)	6 ft 1 in (1.85 m)	4.49 s	1.60 s	2.48 s	4.21 s	6.82 s	40.0 in (1.02 m)	11 ft 0 in (3.35 m)
All values from Pro Day

=== Jacksonville Jaguars ===
Braswell was selected by the Jacksonville Jaguars in the sixth round (202nd overall) of the 2023 NFL draft. He was placed on injured reserve on October 14, 2023.

On August 27, 2024, Braswell was waived by the Jaguars and re-signed to the team's practice squad. He signed a reserve/future contract with Jacksonville on January 6, 2025.

On October 6, 2026, Braswell was waived by the Jaguars with an injury designation.

=== Philadelphia Eagles ===
On November 4, 2026, Braswell signed with the Philadelphia Eagles practice squad.
