= Todd Stroud =

American football player and coach (born 1963)

Current position
- Title: Senior Football Advisor
- Team: Miami (FL)
- Conference: ACC

Biographical details
- Born: December 17, 1963 (age 62); St. Petersburg, Florida, U.S.

Playing career
- 1983–1985: Florida State
- Position: Nose tackle

Coaching career (HC unless noted)
- 1986: UCF (DL)
- 1987–1992: Samford (DL/strength)
- 1993: Auburn (strength)
- 1994–1996: Livingston / West Alabama
- 1997–1999: Memphis (strength)
- 1999–2004: NC State (strength)
- 2004–2006: NC State (associate HC / DL)
- 2007–2009: Florida State (strength)
- 2010: Colorado State (TE/FB)
- 2011: Colorado State (DL)
- 2012–2018: Akron (DL)
- 2019–2021: Miami (FL) (assistant HC / DL)
- 2022–present: Miami (FL) (Senior Football Advisor)

Head coaching record
- Overall: 6–25

Todd Stroud (born December 17, 1963) is an American football coach and former player. He is the senior football advisor at the University of Miami in Coral Gables, Florida, a position he has held since 2022. He was previously the defensive line coach for University of Akron. Stroud played nose tackle for Florida State from 1983 to 1985, won the team's Bob Crenshaw Award in 1984, and was a team captain in 1985. He has been an assistant coach at the University of Memphis, Samford University, and Auburn University, and was head football coach at the University of West Alabama from 1994 to 1996. From 2004 to 2007, he was the defensive line coach at North Carolina State University and from 2007 to 2009 was the strength and conditioning coach for Florida State.

== Head coaching record ==
Year	Team	Overall	Conference	Standing	Bowl/playoffs
Livingston / West Alabama Tigers (Gulf South Conference) (1994–1996)
1994	Livingston	1–9	0–7	8th	
1995	West Alabama	2–9	0–8	11th	
1996	West Alabama	3–7	1–6	10th	
Livingston / West Alabama:		6–25	1–21		
Total:		6–25			
