= Markus White =

American gridiron football player (born 1987)

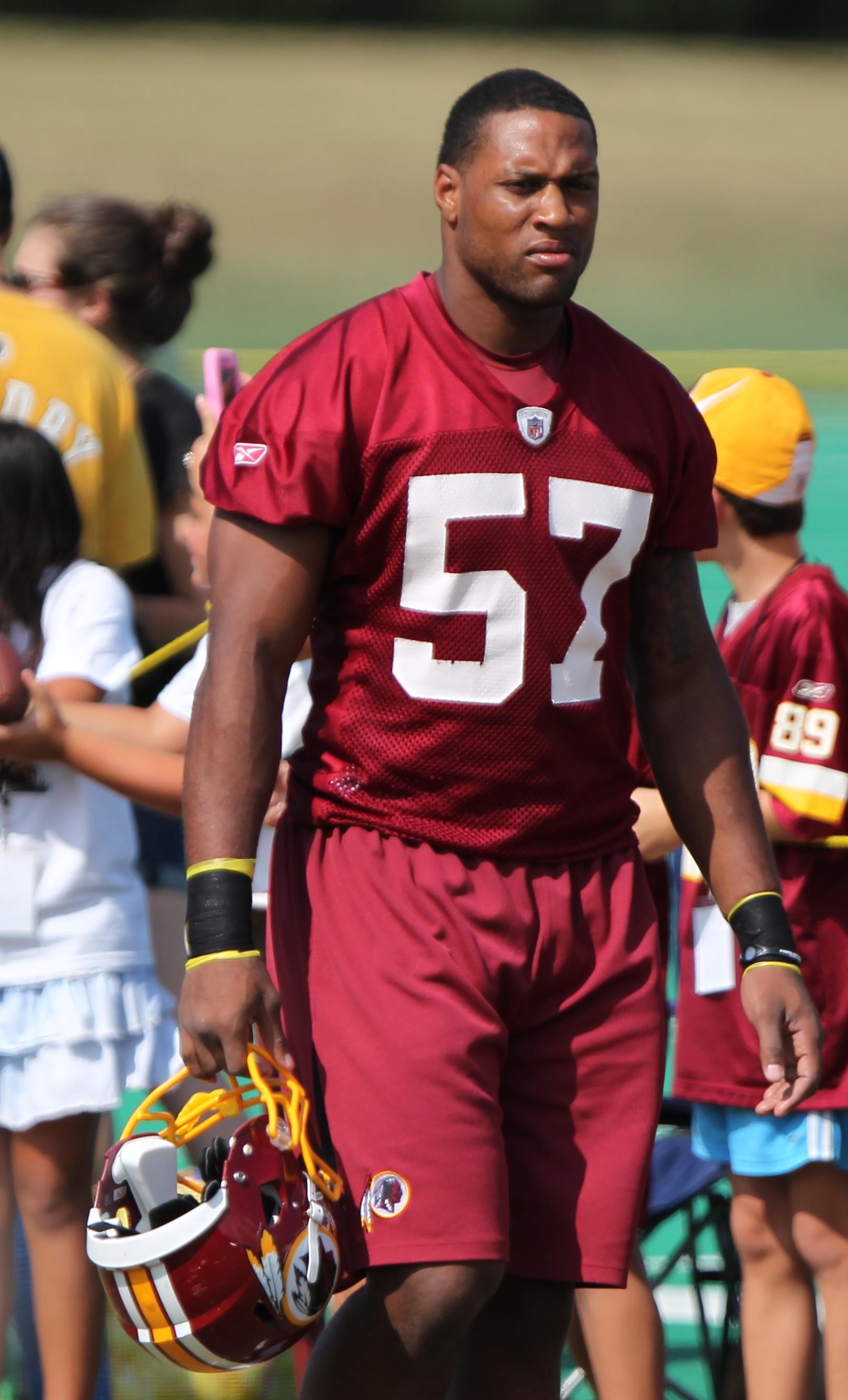
- White with the Washington Redskins in 2011

No. 55, 92, 98
- Position: Defensive end

Personal information
- Born: November 25, 1987 (age 38); Boynton Beach, Florida, U.S.
- Listed height: 6 ft 4 in (1.93 m)
- Listed weight: 264 lb (120 kg)

Career information
- High school: John I. Leonard (Greenacres, Florida)
- College: Florida State
- NFL draft: 2011: 7th round, 224th overall pick

Career history
- Washington Redskins (2011); Tampa Bay Buccaneers (2012)*; Washington Redskins (2012); Tampa Bay Buccaneers (2012); Saskatchewan Roughriders (2014–2015)
- * Offseason or practice squad member only
- Stats at Pro Football Reference

Markus White (born November 25, 1987) is an American former professional football defensive end. He was selected by the Washington Redskins in the seventh round of the 2011 NFL draft. He played college football at Florida State University. Prior to playing for Florida State, he played one season at Butler Community College where he received the NJCAA national player of the year.

== Early life ==
A native of Lake Worth, Florida, White attended John I. Leonard High School, where he was teammates with Kenrick Ellis.

Regarded as a two-star recruit by Rivals.com, White was not ranked among the best defensive end prospects of his class. He had offers from Akron, Florida Atlantic, Western Michigan, before committing to Rutgers. However, White did not manage to qualify academically, and transferred to Butler Community College.

== College career ==
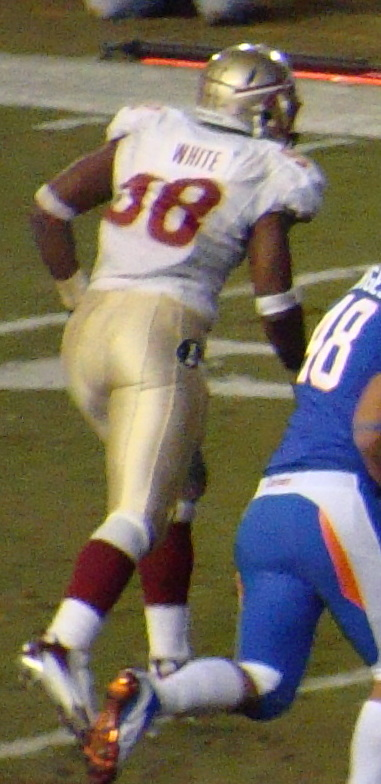
White with Florida State in 2009

At Butler Community College, White became a nationally recognized defensive lineman. He set a school record with 24.5 sacks which led the nation, as did his six forced fumbles, and also amassed 97 tackles, of which 39 were behind the line of scrimmage. White was named the NJCAA national player of the year in his lone season at Butler, which went 12-0 and shared the national title after routing No. 1 Snow College.

Now a five-star junior college recruit, White received numerous offers before committing to Florida State. He begin his career with the Seminoles as back-up for Everette Brown, before taking over as starter in 2009.

== Professional career ==
Pre-draft measurables
Height	Weight	Arm length	Hand span	Wingspan	40-yard dash	10-yard split	20-yard split	20-yard shuttle	Three-cone drill	Vertical jump	Broad jump	Bench press
6 ft 3 1/2 in (1.92 m)	266 lb (121 kg)	33 3/8 in (0.85 m)	10 in (0.25 m)	6 ft 9 in (2.06 m)	4.82 s	1.75 s	2.89 s	4.51 s	7.25 s	32.5 in (0.83 m)	9 ft 9 in (2.97 m)	15 reps
All values from NFL Combine/Pro Day

=== Washington Redskins (first stint) ===
White was selected 224th overall in the seventh round of the 2011 NFL draft by the Washington Redskins. He was converted from a defensive end to an outside linebacker along with fellow rookie Ryan Kerrigan. He was made the third-string left outside linebacker behind fellow rookie Ryan Kerrigan and Lorenzo Alexander. At the end of the 2011 season, White played a total of two games primarily on special teams.

During the 2012 preseason, White suffered a fractured rib and bruised kidney at practice on August 16. He was released on August 31 for final roster cuts before the start of the 2012 season.

=== Tampa Bay Buccaneers (first stint) ===
On September 3, 2012, White signed with the practice squad of the Tampa Bay Buccaneers.

=== Washington Redskins (second stint) ===
On September 18, 2012, White was claimed by the Redskins from the practice squad of the Tampa Bay Buccaneers, after the season-ending injury of fellow linebacker Brian Orakpo. He was released on October 9, 2012, to make room on the roster for Mario Addison.

=== Tampa Bay Buccaneers (second stint) ===
White was re-signed to the Buccaneers' practice squad on October 11. He was signed to the active roster two days later. The Buccaneers released him on October 18. Two days later he was signed to the practice squad.

On November 14, White was promoted to the active roster again to replace Quincy Black, who was placed on injured reserve. He was waived on November 17 and signed to the practice squad for a fourth time. On December 22, once again White was promoted to the active roster after Aaron Morgan was placed on injured reserve. On August 26, 2013, he was waived by the Buccaneers.

=== Saskatchewan Roughriders ===
White signed a free agent contract with the Riders in May 2014. White re-signed with the Riders on February 16, 2016. He was released by the Roughriders during final cuts in June 2016.
