= Reggie Northrup =

American football player (born 1993)

No. 5
- Position: Linebacker

Personal information
- Born: October 17, 1993 (age 33); Jacksonville, Florida, U.S.
- Listed height: 6 ft 1 in (1.85 m)
- Listed weight: 205 lb (93 kg)

Career information
- High school: First Coast (Jacksonville, Florida)
- College: Florida State (2012–2015)
- NFL draft: 2016: undrafted

Career history
- Washington Redskins (2016)*; Los Angeles Rams (2016–2017)*; Montreal Alouettes (2017); Orlando Apollos (2019); Tampa Bay Vipers (2020); Houston Gamblers (2022); DC Defenders (2023–2024)
- * Offseason or practice squad member only

Reggie Northrup (born October 17, 1993) is an American MMA fighter and former football linebacker. He played college football at Florida State.

== Professional football career ==
=== Washington Redskins ===
On May 9, 2016, Northrup was signed to the Washington Redskins as an undrafted free agent. On May 16, he was waived.

=== Workout with Detroit Lions ===
On October 9, 2016, Northrup worked out with the Detroit Lions along with Brandon Chubb.

=== Los Angeles Rams ===
On December 19, 2016, Northrup was signed to the Los Angeles Rams's practice squad. On January 3, 2017, he was signed to a futures deal. He was waived on June 20, 2017.

=== Montreal Alouettes ===
On September 20, 2017, Northrup was signed with the Montreal Alouettes of the Canadian Football League (CFL). In week 15, Northrup made his professional debut and compiled six defensive tackles. He played again in week 18 and made two tackles. In week 19, Northrup had 4 defensive tackles. In his final game in the CFL, week 20, Northrup made 10 defensive tackles and 1 special teams tackle.

=== Orlando Apollos ===
In 2019, Northrup joined the Orlando Apollos of the Alliance of American Football (AAF). When the AAF suspended operations in week 8, he finished with 35 solo tackles, 27 assists, 62 total tackles, and 1 sack. He led the league with assists and tied for fifth in total tackles.

=== Tampa Bay Vipers ===
In October 2019, Northrup was selected by the Tampa Bay Vipers in the 2020 XFL draft. Northrup ended up starting 1 of 5 games, and finished with 12 solo tackles, 3 assists, 15 total tackles, and 1 sack. He had his contract terminated when the league suspended operations on April 10, 2020.

=== Houston Gamblers ===
Northrup was selected in the 21st round of the 2022 USFL draft by the Houston Gamblers. He became a free agent when his contract expired on December 31, 2022.

=== DC Defenders ===
On January 1, 2023, Northrup was selected by the DC Defenders in the second round of the 2023 XFL Supplemental Draft.

== Mixed Martial Arts career ==
Reggie Northrup
- Other names: Black Dragon
- Height: 6 ft 1 in (1.85 m)
- Weight: 205 lb (93 kg)
- Division: Light Heavyweight
- Style: Jeet Kune Do
- Fighting out of: Jacksonville, Florida, United States
- Years active: 2020–present

Mixed martial arts record
- Total: 2
- Wins: 2
- By knockout: 1
- By decision: 1
- Losses: 0

Amateur record
- Total: 5
- Wins: 5
- By knockout: 3
- By submission: 2

Other information
- Mixed martial arts record from Sherdog

=== Amateur career ===
In December 2020, Northrup made his amateur MMA debut, in which he defeated Mike Anderson by submission in the first round. In March 2021, he fought Josh Mercado in which he won via submission in the third round. In July 2021 he fought Kevin Church, in which he won by knockout. In December 2021, he defeated Darius Kennedy in bare knuckle by knockout in the first round. Northrup's final match was in January 2022, where defeated Jay Mitchell in 35 seconds by knockout. On January 26, 2024 Northrup competed on the main card of Karate Combat: Kickback 1 in Miami Florida. He would go on to lose via split decision.

== Mixed martial arts record ==
Professional record breakdown
4 matches	3 wins	1 loss
By knockout	2	0
By submission	0	1
By decision	1	0

Res.	Record	Opponent	Method	Event	Date	Round	Time	Location	Notes
Loss	3–1	Jose Soto	Submission (guillotine choke)	Cage Fury FC 145	August 30, 2025	1	4:44	Atlantic City, New Jersey, United States	Return to Light Heavyweight.
Win	3–0	Mikey Furnier	TKO (flying knee and punches)	Double Down FC 2	November 8, 2024	1	1:39	Miami, Florida, United States	Heavyweight debut.
Win	2–0	Cody Herbert	Decision (unanimous)	Gamebred Bareknuckle MMA 5	September 8, 2023	3	5:00	Jacksonville, Florida, United States	
Win	1–0	Michael Johnson	TKO (punches)	Jorge Masvidal's iKon FC 6	December 2, 2022	1	2:24	Kissimmee, Florida, United States	Light Heavyweight debut.
