= Eddie Goldman =

American football player (born 1994)

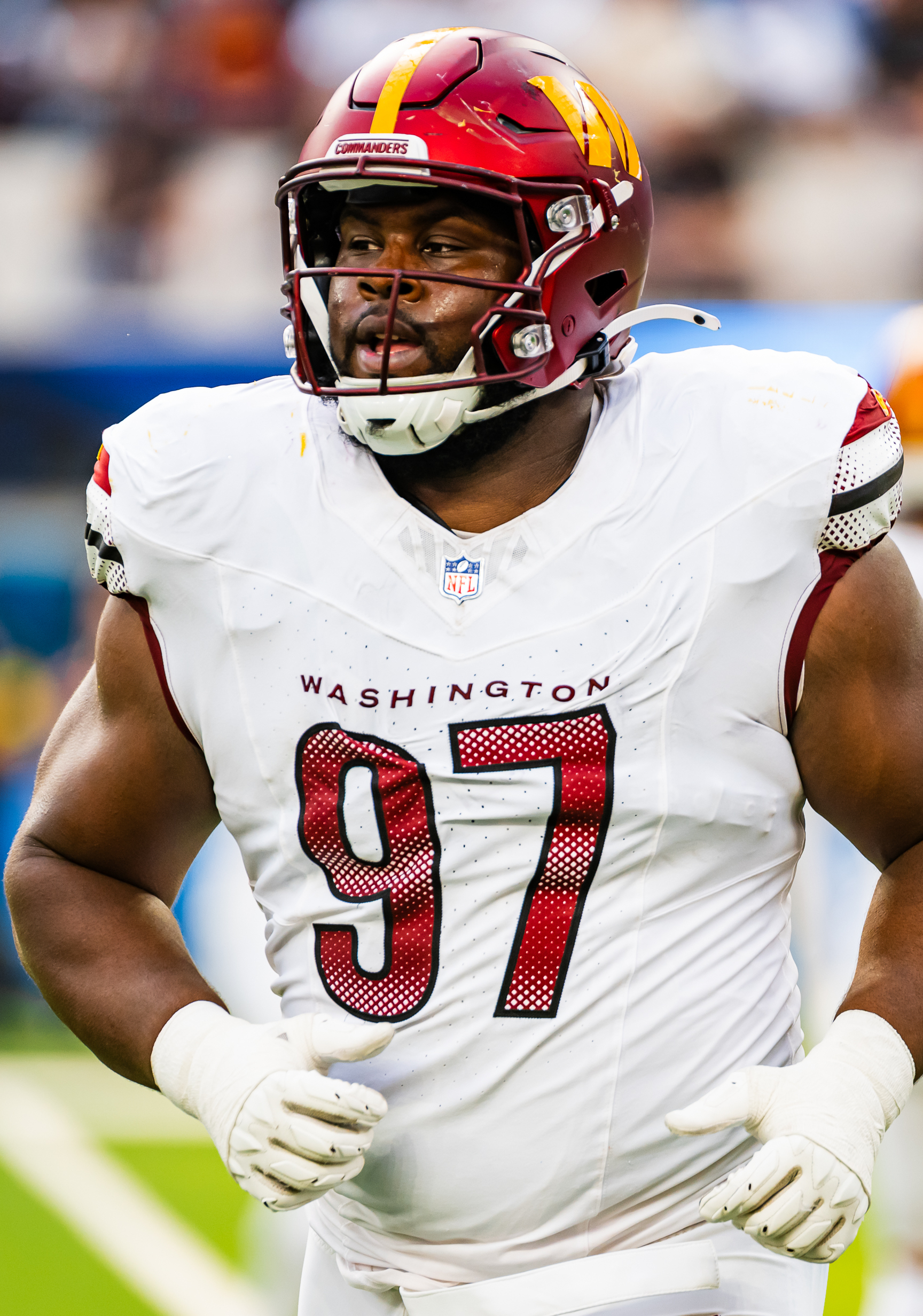
- Goldman with the Washington Commanders in 2025

Profile
- Position: Defensive tackle

Personal information
- Born: January 6, 1994 (age 32); Washington, D.C., U.S.
- Listed height: 6 ft 3 in (1.91 m)
- Listed weight: 332 lb (151 kg)

Career information
- High school: Friendship Collegiate Academy (Washington, D.C.)
- College: Florida State (2012–2014)
- NFL draft: 2015: 2nd round, 39th overall pick

Career history
- Chicago Bears (2015–2021); Atlanta Falcons (2024); Washington Commanders (2025)

Awards and highlights
- PFWA All-Rookie Team (2015); BCS national champion (2013); First-team All-ACC (2014)

Career NFL statistics as of 2025
- Tackles: 217
- Sacks: 14
- Fumble recoveries: 2
- Pass deflections: 1
- Stats at Pro Football Reference

Eddie Goldman (born January 6, 1994) is an American professional football defensive tackle. He played college football for the Florida State Seminoles and was selected by the Chicago Bears in the second round of the 2015 NFL draft. Goldman has also played for the Atlanta Falcons and Washington Commanders.

== Early life ==
A native of Washington, D.C., he attended Friendship Collegiate Academy Public Charter School, where he played football with Yannick Ngakoue and Teez Tabor, and basketball. In football, he was an All-American defensive lineman. Considered a five-star recruit by ESPN and Rivals.com, Goldman was listed as the second best defensive tackle in his class, behind only Mario Edwards Jr., who later on attended Florida State with Goldman.

== College career ==
Goldman attended Florida State University from 2012 to 2014. During his career, he had 262 tackles and six sacks. After his junior season, Goldman decided to forgo his senior year and enter the 2015 NFL draft

== Professional career ==
Pre-draft measurables
Height	Weight	Arm length	Hand span	Wingspan	40-yard dash	10-yard split	20-yard split	20-yard shuttle	Three-cone drill	Vertical jump	Bench press
6 ft 3 7/8 in (1.93 m)	336 lb (152 kg)	33 1/8 in (0.84 m)	10 1/8 in (0.26 m)	6 ft 7 5/8 in (2.02 m)	5.28 s	1.89 s	3.03 s	4.82 s	7.62 s	24.5 in (0.62 m)	19 reps
All values from NFL Combine/Pro Day

=== Chicago Bears ===
Goldman was drafted 39th overall by the Chicago Bears in the 2015 NFL Draft. In his rookie year, he played fifteen games, recording 39 tackles and six tackles for a loss, while being ranked fourth among rookies with 4.5 sacks. For his season, he was named to Mel Kiper Jr.'s All-Rookie Team and the Pro Football Writers of America's All-Rookie Team.

Goldman played in six games with five starts in 2016. He suffered a high ankle sprain in Week 2 and missed the next six games. He returned in Week 10 but was bothered by the ankle injury and was placed on injured reserve on December 23, 2016.

Goldman played in 15 games with 14 starts in the 2017 season. He recorded 1.5 sacks, 44 combined tackles, five quarterback hits, and one fumble recovery.

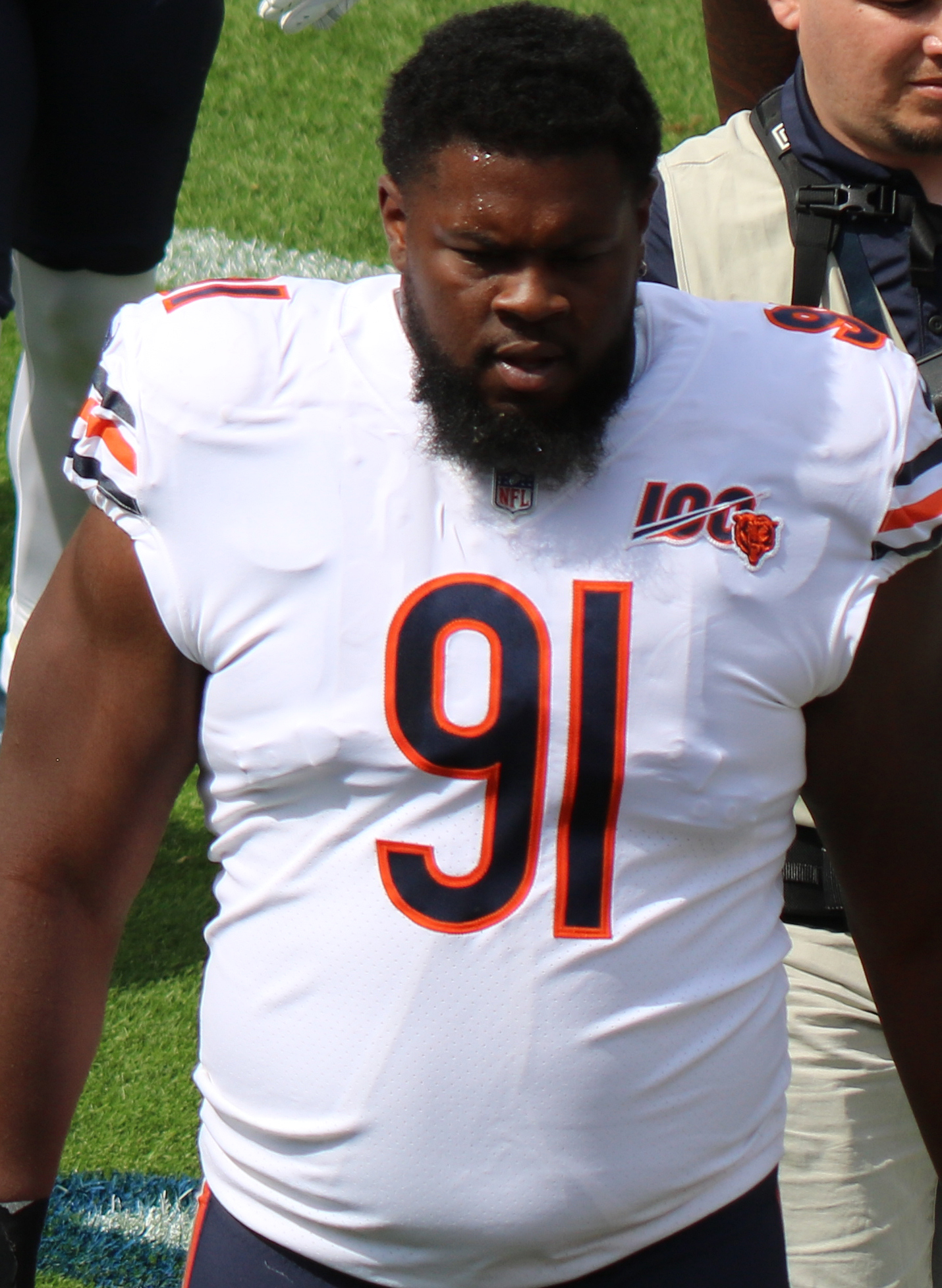
Goldman with the Chicago Bears in 2019

On September 7, 2018, Goldman signed a four-year contract extension with the Bears worth $42 million with $25 million guaranteed. In week 14 against the Los Angeles Rams, Goldman sacked Jared Goff in the end zone for a safety. The Bears won the game 15–6. He finished the 2018 season with three sacks, 40 combined tackles, three quarterback hits, and one fumble recovery. He received an overall grade of 89.2 from Pro Football Focus in 2018, which ranked as the 12th highest grade among all qualifying interior defenders.

Goldman played in 15 games with 15 starts in the 2019 season. He recorded one sack and 29 combined tackles with two tackles for loss. At the end of the season Goldman was selected as Pro Bowl alternate.

On July 28, 2020, Goldman informed the Bears he would opt out of the season due to the COVID-19 pandemic. He received a $350,000 stipend for the season, and his original base salary of $4.75 million will be his salary for the following season.

Goldman returned to the Bears for the 2021 season. In 14 games, he netted half a sack with 22 total tackles.

On March 14, 2022, Goldman was released by the Bears.

=== Atlanta Falcons ===
Goldman signed with the Atlanta Falcons on July 6, 2022. Thirteen days after signing with the team, Goldman announced his retirement from the NFL.

On March 21, 2023, Goldman came out of retirement and the Falcons reinstated him back to their active roster. He was placed on the exempt/left squad list on July 29.

On April 2, 2024, Goldman was released off of the Falcons reserve list. However, the same day, he re-signed with the team. In the 2024 season, Goldman played in all 17 games for Atlanta with 10 starts at defensive tackle. He recorded 16 total tackles and one sack.

=== Washington Commanders ===
On March 15, 2025, Goldman signed a one-year contract with the Washington Commanders. He made 13 appearances (six starts) for Washington, recording 26 combined tackles. On December 22, the Commanders placed Goldman on season-ending injured reserve due to a concussion suffered in Week 15 against the New York Giants.

== NFL career statistics ==
Legend
**Bold**	Career high

=== Regular season ===
Year	Team	Games		Tackles					Interceptions					Fumbles			
Year	Team	GP	GS	Cmb	Solo	Ast	Sck	TFL	Int	Yds	TD	Lng	PD	FF	FR	Yds	TD
2015	CHI	15	12	22	16	6	**4.5**	**5**	0	0	0	0	0	0	0	0	0
2016	CHI	6	5	18	12	6	2.5	2	0	0	0	0	**1**	0	0	0	0
2017	CHI	15	15	**44**	**27**	**17**	1.5	3	0	0	0	0	0	0	**1**	0	0
2018	CHI	**16**	**16**	40	**27**	13	3.0	**5**	0	0	0	0	0	0	**1**	0	0
2019	CHI	15	15	29	20	9	1.0	2	0	0	0	0	0	0	0	0	0
2021	CHI	14	10	22	14	8	0.5	1	0	0	0	0	0	0	0	0	0
2024	ATL	17	10	16	7	9	1.0	1	0	0	0	0	0	0	0	0	0
Career		98	83	191	123	68	14.0	19	0	0	0	0	1	0	2	0	0

=== Playoffs ===
Year	Team	Games		Tackles					Interceptions					Fumbles			
Year	Team	GP	GS	Cmb	Solo	Ast	Sck	TFL	Int	Yds	TD	Lng	PD	FF	FR	Yds	TD
2018	CHI	**1**	**1**	**4**	**2**	**2**	0.0	**1**	0	0	0	0	0	0	0	0	0
Career		1	1	4	2	2	0.0	1	0	0	0	0	0	0	0	0	0
