= Dan Footman =

American football player (born 1969)

No. 78, 98
- Position: Defensive lineman

Personal information
- Born: January 13, 1969 (age 57); Tampa, Florida, U.S.
- Listed height: 6 ft 5 in (1.96 m)
- Listed weight: 290 lb (132 kg)

Career information
- High school: Hillsborough (Tampa)
- College: Florida State
- NFL draft: 1993: 2nd round, 42nd overall pick

Career history
- Cleveland Browns (1993–1995); Baltimore Ravens (1996); Indianapolis Colts (1997–1998)

Awards and highlights
- ACC Brian Piccolo Award (1992)

Career NFL statistics
- Tackles: 139
- Sacks: 19.5
- Fumble recoveries: 3
- Stats at Pro Football Reference

Dan Footman (born January 13, 1969) is an American former professional football player who was a defensive lineman in the National Football League (NFL). He played college football for the Florida State Seminoles.

== College career ==
He played college football for the Florida State Seminoles. He started out as an outside linebacker in 1990 before being switched to defensive end for the 1991 and 1992 seasons.

He would finish his career with 102 tackles, 7 tackles for loss, and 8.5 Sacks including 4 in 11 games as a senior.

== Professional career ==
He was selected by the Cleveland Browns in the second round of the 1993 NFL draft. Footman also played for the Baltimore Ravens and Indianapolis Colts.

While playing under Bill Belichick, Footman accumulated 8.5 Sacks over 3 seasons including 5.0 in 16 starts during the 1995 season. In 1997, he went to the Indianapolis Colts and recorded a career best 10.5 Sacks in 10 starts. He made just 3 starts in 1998 before retiring due to injury.
