= Monk Bonasorte =

American football player (1957–2016)

Francis Joseph "Monk" Bonasorte (March 11, 1957 – November 19, 2016) was an All-American college football player and associate athletic director at Florida State University. After an accomplished playing career with the Seminoles, he worked in various semi-pro sports leagues before returning to Florida State, initially to head the school's Varsity Club. He joined the athletic department in 2008, eventually rising to become the "de facto athletic director" for the football program. He was diagnosed with brain cancer in October 2015, and died in November of the following year.

== Playing time ==
Bonasorte played for Florida State Seminoles from 1977 until 1980, including starring on the 1979 team which went undefeated during the regular season. He held the school's career (15) and season (8 in 1979) interception records until both marks were eclipsed by Terrell Buckley in 1991. Bonasorte was a two-time All-American and was inducted into Florida State's Hall of Fame in 1995.

A member of Florida State's All-Time football team as named by Athlon Magazine, he earned four varsity letters (1977–80), played in the 1977 Tangerine Bowl and two Orange Bowls (1980 and 1981) and was inducted into the FSU Athletics Hall of Fame in 1995 as one of the top defensive backs in school history. He ranks second in school history with 15 interceptions while his eight interceptions in 1979 ranks as the second highest single season total in school history.

Bonasorte earned All-America Third Team honors in 1979 by the Associated Press and All-America Second Team honors from Football News in 1980.

Bonasorte starred on one of the toughest defensive units in Florida State history in 1979. He led the nation in interceptions for the majority of the 1979 season and finished with eight to rank fourth nationally and set a Seminole record for interceptions in a season. The Seminoles ranked sixth nationally and fifth nationally during his junior and senior seasons respectively.

== Career ==
After his college career, Bonasorte worked as a scouting coordinator for the Jacksonville Bulls of the United States Football League. He later worked as the vice-president and general manager of the Tallahassee Thunder of the af2 football league.

In 2003, after the Thunder ceased operations, he took a job as the executive director of the FSU Varsity Club for former Florida State athletes. He was considered one of the most beloved people in the administration, and his death has been cited as a factor in the decline of the football program.

Bonasorte also spent seven years working with the Elmore Sports Group. He served as the marketing director for two seasons for the Eastern Indoor Soccer League's Tallahassee Scorpions, as well as being the director of marketing for the East Coast Hockey League's Tallahassee Tiger Sharks from 1997 to 1999.

== Personal life ==
Bonasorte overcame personal challenges early in his adult life, spending six months in jail after pleading guilty in 1987 to charges of cocaine distribution. Bonasorte and his wife Beverly, have two sons: T.J. and Rocky. He died on November 19, 2016, at the age of 59 from brain cancer. He was a native of Pittsburgh, PA.
