= Greenacres, Florida =

- City
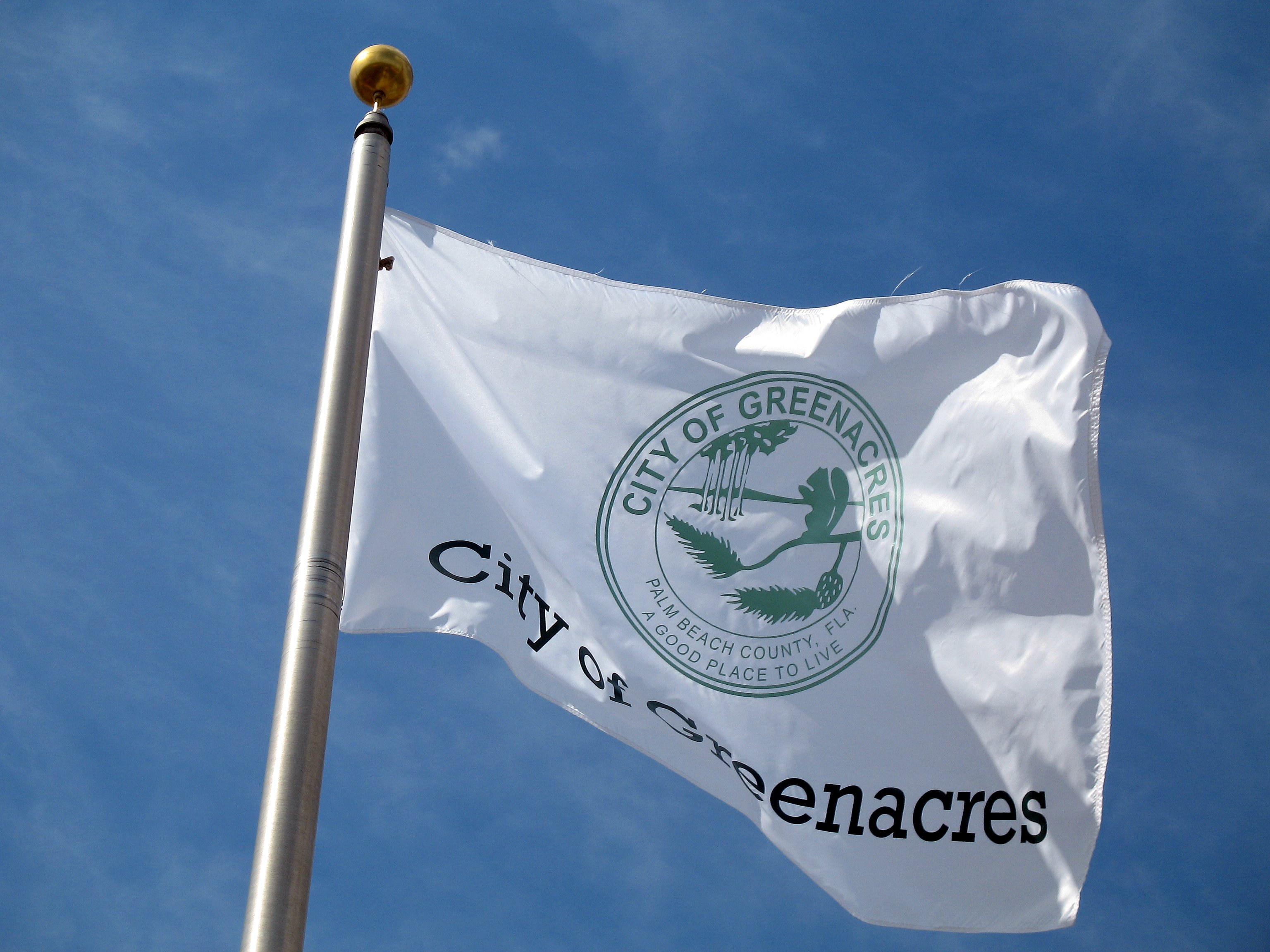
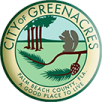
- Flag Seal
- Motto(s): "A Good Place to Live" "Live·Learn·Work·Play"
- Location of Greenacres, Florida
- Coordinates: 26°36′48″N 80°07′20″W
- Country: United States
- State: Florida
- County: Palm Beach
- Incorporated (Town of Greenacres City): May 24, 1926
- Reincorporated (City of Greenacres City): December 4, 1945
- Incorporated (City of Greenacres): November 6, 1990

Government
  - Type: Council-Manager

Area
  - Total: 6.04 sq mi (15.64 km^{2})
  - Land: 6.00 sq mi (15.54 km^{2})
  - Water: 0.039 sq mi (0.10 km^{2})
- Elevation: 16 ft (4.9 m)

Population (2020)
  - Total: 43,990
  - Density: 7,331.9/sq mi (2,830.85/km^{2})
- Time zone: UTC-5 (Eastern (EST))
  - Summer (DST): UTC-4 (EDT)
- ZIP codes: 33413, 33415, 33454, 33463, 33467
- Area codes: 561, 728
- FIPS code: 12-27322
- GNIS feature ID: 2403738
- Website: greenacresfl.gov

Greenacres is a city in Palm Beach County, Florida, United States. It is part of the Miami metropolitan area in South Florida. As of the 2020 census, the city had a population of 43,990 residents.

Frederick E. Bryant, Harold J. Bryant, and William Greenwood of the Palm Beach Farms Company began buying and selling thousands of acres of land in the area by 1909. However, difficulties with farming in wetland conditions left the land mostly unused until the 1920s land boom. Lawrence Carter "L. C." Swain then platted the original section of Greenacres beginning in 1923. The community was incorporated as Greenacres City on May 24, 1926, with the name being drawn out of a hat. The city was dis-incorporated under controversial circumstances in 1945, before being officially re-incorporated in 1947. The city's population remained small until rapid growth began in the 1970s. Residents voted to rename the community Greenacres in 1990.

Today, Greenacres is a diverse and relatively large community in terms of population. John I. Leonard High School, the largest high school in Palm Beach County and one of the largest in Florida, has been located in Greenacres since the city annexed the property in 1994.

== History ==
In 1909, Frederick E. Bryant—a British agriculturalist—Harold J. Bryant, and William Greenwood of the Palm Beach Farms Company in Colorado, bought thousands of acres of land in the Everglades and later along the coast of Lake Worth in 1910. The men sold the land to buyers throughout the United States and Canada, offering 5 acres (2.0 ha) plots for $250, with a $10 down payment and a $10 per month charge, which also included a 25 by 25 ft (7.6 by 7.6 m) parcel on the shore of Lake Worth. However, difficulties involved with farming in the Everglades forced 308 buyers to settle at their properties along Lake Worth, an area that would later become the city of Lake Worth Beach. Until the land boom of the 1920s, these lots were effectively abandoned. Around that time, Lawrence Carter "L. C." Swain of Massachusetts acquired 320 acres (130 ha) of land, with the intention of creating a community for the working class. He initially platted approximately half of the land in 1923, with a plat just west of Military Trail becoming the original section of the city. By 1925, Swain began selling lots for $225.

The town was originally incorporated as Greenacres City on May 24, 1926. The name Greenacres was the winning entry in a local naming contest. Upon incorporating, the town had an estimated 1,250 residents. Swain also became honorary mayor, before the first officials were elected, which included J. H. Southard as mayor, G. W. Simpson as clerk, A. P. Lane as marshal, and S. R. Allen, A. E. Fernell, Robert Hansen, C. Martin, I. E. Shivers, and F. L. Woods as aldermen. Additionally, G. W. Fleenor of Lake Worth became acting attorney. In September of that year, a hurricane destroyed the civic building and community hall, but did not cause much other significant damage. Two years later, Greenacres City was devastated by the 1928 Okeechobee hurricane, which damaged "practically every building" substantially, according to The Lake Worth Herald.

Swain died in 1944; Swain Boulevard and L. C. Swain Middle School are named in his honor. In 1945, about 125 residents petitioned for the Florida Legislature to abolish Greenacres City as a municipality. The legislature passed a bill to dis-incorporate Greenacres City in April of that year, which became a law on April 24, 1945, without the signature of Governor Millard Caldwell. Then-Mayor Charles A. Grabowski actively fought the new law, as no referendum to forfeit the town's charter had been held. Additionally, Grabowski accused a resident of starting the dissolution movement out of spite after being denied a homestead exemption and claimed that many of the signatories did not actually own property in Greenacres City. Grabowski also asserted that the pleas of city officials and a large number of residents in favor of remaining a town were ignored. On December 4, 1945, a meeting was held to reincorporate Greenacres City. A total of 86 out of 120 registered voters turned out, more than the two-thirds of voters quorum required. The 86 voters unanimously decided to reincorporate. The area's rights as a city were restored, while Greenacres City was officially reincorporated in 1947. Over the subsequent decades, Greenacres City eventually expanded to 6 sq mi (16 km^{2}) through annexation.

In the 1960s, a city hall complex was constructed at the intersection of Perry Avenue and Fourth Street, while a community center was built nearby. The city hall complex originally included a public library and all other city departments, except for the fire and public works departments. By the 1970s, full-time police and fire departments were established. In response to concerns about future growth, residents approved a bond referendum in 1984 to fund construction of a new city hall, a public safety complex, and recreational facilities. On November 6, 1990, about 60% of voters chose to drop the word "city" from the official name, thus renaming the municipality Greenacres. After the 1990 census indicated a population of 18,638, city council authorized a special census in 1993, which added more than 3,000 additional residents to the official population count, making Greenacres eligible for funds from the state government of Florida. To commemorate the city's 80th anniversary, the Greenacres Historical Society was formed in 2006, with a museum established two years later. In July 2007, construction was completed on a new city hall and public works facility on Melaleuca Lane.

== Geography ==
According to the United States Census Bureau, the city has a total area of 5.79 square miles (15.0 km^{2}), all land.

Situated in the east-central portion of the county, Greenacres is located northwest of Atlantis, east of Wellington, and borders Palm Springs to its east.

=== Climate ===
Greenacres has a tropical climate, similar to the climate found in much of the Caribbean. It is part of the only region in the 48 contiguous states that falls under that category. More specifically, it generally has a tropical monsoon climate (Köppen climate classification, Am).

== Demographics ==
Historical population
Census	Pop.	Note	%±
1930	329		—
1940	304		−7.6%
1950	531		74.7%
1960	1,026		93.2%
1970	1,731		68.7%
1980	8,780		407.2%
1990	18,683		112.8%
2000	27,569		47.6%
2010	37,573		36.3%
2020	43,990		17.1%
U.S. Decennial Census

=== Racial and ethnic composition ===
Greenacres racial composition (Hispanics excluded from racial categories) (NH = Non-Hispanic)
Race	Pop 2010	Pop 2020	% 2010	% 2020
White (NH)	15,347	11,739	40.85%	26.69%
Black or African American (NH)	6,008	9,430	15.99%	21.44%
Native American or Alaska Native (NH)	57	50	0.15%	0.11%
Asian (NH)	1,104	1,649	2.94%	3.75%
Pacific Islander or Native Hawaiian (NH)	25	5	0.07%	0.01%
Some other race (NH)	122	310	0.32%	0.70%
Two or more races/Multiracial (NH)	520	1,127	1.38%	2.56%
Hispanic or Latino (any race)	14,390	19,680	38.30%	44.74%
Total	37,573	43,990	100.00%	100.00%

=== 2020 census ===
As of the 2020 census, Greenacres had a population of 43,990 and 16,113 households, of which 9,601 were family households. The median age was 38.2 years; 23.3% of residents were under the age of 18 and 16.4% were 65 years of age or older. For every 100 females there were 90.5 males, and for every 100 females age 18 and over there were 86.4 males age 18 and over.

The population density was 7,331.67 inhabitants per square mile (2,830.8/km^{2}). The 17,927 housing units averaged 3,043.6 inhabitants per square mile (1,175.1/km^{2}). Adults age 18 and over comprised 76.7% of residents. 100.0% of residents lived in urban areas, while 0.0% lived in rural areas.

Of the 16,113 households, 35.3% had children under the age of 18 living in them. Of all households, 42.1% were married-couple households, 17.3% were households with a male householder and no spouse or partner present, and 32.6% were households with a female householder and no spouse or partner present. About 25.4% of all households were made up of individuals and 12.8% had someone living alone who was 65 years of age or older.

There were 17,927 housing units, of which 10.1% were vacant. The homeowner vacancy rate was 1.3% and the rental vacancy rate was 6.7%.

Racial composition as of the 2020 census
Race	Number	Percent
White	15,671	35.6%
Black or African American	9,771	22.2%
American Indian and Alaska Native	418	1.0%
Asian	1,682	3.8%
Native Hawaiian and Other Pacific Islander	8	0.0%
Some other race	7,151	16.3%
Two or more races	9,289	21.1%
Hispanic or Latino (of any race)	19,680	44.7%

=== 2010 census ===
As of the 2010 United States census, there were 37,573 people, 14,282 households, and 8,405 families were residing in the city. The population density was 6,487.5 inhabitants per square mile (2,504.84/km^{2}). The 17,249 housing units averaged 2,928.5 inhabitants per square mile (1,130.7/km^{2}).

In 2010, in the city, the age distribution was 16.6% at 65 or older, 24.8% was under 18, 7.6% from 18 to 24, 28.9% from 25 to 44, and 22.1% from 45 to 64; the median age was 36.3 years. For every 100 females, there were 90.6 males. For every 100 females age 18 and over, there were 86.6 males. Around 35.4% of the households in 2010 had children under the age of 18 living with them, 16.4% were married couples living together, 16.5% had a female householder with no spouse present, and 34.4% were not families. About 27.9% of all households were made up of one individual, and 32.4% had someone living alone who was 65 years of age or older. The average household size was 2.61, and the average family size was 3.17.

=== 2000 census ===
As of 2000, 24.5% had children under the age of 18 living with them, 45.9% were married couples living together, 12.5% had a female householder with no husband present, and 37.1% were non-families. 29.7% of all households were made up of individuals, and 15.1% had someone living alone who was 65 years of age or older. The average household size was 2.29 and the average family size was 2.80.

As of the census of 2000, there were 27,569 people, 12,059 households, and 7,585 families residing in the city. The population density was 5,917.6 inhabitants per square mile (2,284.2/km²). There were 14,153 housing units at an average density of 3,037.9 per square mile (1,172.6/km²). The racial makeup of the village was 83.21% White (69.2% were Non-Hispanic White), 6.49% African American, 0.35% Native American, 1.83% Asian, 0.04% Pacific Islander, 5.61% from other races, and 2.47% from two or more races. Hispanic or Latino of any race were 21.25% of the population.

The age distribution of the population was spread out in 2000, with 20.9% of the population were under the age of 18, 7.6% from 18 to 24, 28.5% from 25 to 44, 19.4% from 45 to 64, and 23.6% who were 65 years of age or older. The median age was 40 years. For every 100 females, there were 87.9 males. For every 100 females age 18 and over, there were 84.2 males. As of 2000, 24.5% had children under the age of 18 living with them, 45.9% were married couples living together, 12.5% had a female householder with no spouse present, and 37.1% were non-families. Approximately 29.7% of all households were made up of one individual, and 15.1% had someone living alone who was 65 years of age or older. The average household size was 2.29 and the average family size was 2.80.

In 2000, the median household income was $36,941 and the median family income was $41,250. Males had a median income of $30,207 compared with $25,141 for females. The per capita income for the city was $19,298. About 5.0% of families and 7.2% of the population were below the poverty line, including 8.8% of those under age 18 and 6.5% of those age 65 or over.

As of 2000, speakers of English as a first language accounted for 73.64% of all residents, while Spanish accounted for 21.02%, Italian for 1.69%, French Creole made up 1.09%, German was at 0.71%, and French was the mother tongue for 0.45% of the population.

As of 2000, Greenacres had the ninety-ninth highest percentage of Cuban residents in the United States, with 2.41% of the populace (tied with Forest, Mississippi). It also had the ninety-seventh highest percentage of Colombian residents in the United states, at 1.67% of the city's population.

== Education ==
All K–12 public education is administrated by the School District of Palm Beach County, which is the tenth-largest school district in the United States by enrollment.

Public Elementary Schools

- Cholee Lake Elementary School
- Diamond View Elementary School
- Greenacres Elementary School
- Heritage Elementary School
- Liberty Park Elementary School
- Forest Hill Elementary School

Public Middle Schools

- L. C. Swain Middle School
- Okeeheelee Middle School
- Tradewinds Middle School

Public High School

- John I. Leonard High School
