= 2026 New York Mets season =

2026 New York Mets
- League: National League
- Division: East
- Ballpark: Citi Field
- City: New York City, New York
- Record: 74–88 (.457)
- Owner: Steve Cohen
- President: David Stearns
- Manager: Carlos Mendoza (through June 26); Andy Green
- Television: SportsNet New York; PIX 11 (Note: Games on PIX 11 also air on WCCT-TV (Hartford, CT), WCWN/WRGB (Albany, NY), WYCI (Saranac Lake, NY), WSYT-MY43 (Syracuse, NY), WPNY-LD (Utica, NY), WICZ-DT2 (Binghamton, NY), WQMY (Williamsport, PA), WOLF-DT3 (Scranton, PA) and WHAM-DT2 (Rochester, NY).)
- Radio: WHSQ 880 AM (English); New York Mets Radio Network

The 2026 New York Mets season was the 65th season of the New York Mets in Major League Baseball, their 18th at Citi Field, and their sixth under majority owner Steve Cohen. The Mets were unsuccessful in their attempt to improve on their 83–79 record from 2025 to rebound to the playoffs, but finished an overall disappointing season with a strong push, including many positive signs produced by their young core of rookies. Despite this, the Mets finished in last place of the National League East in a full season for the first time since 2003.

The Mets were eliminated from playoff contention on September 14.

This was the last season for Howie Rose, who had been affiliated with the Mets since 1987 and had been team's play by play radio announcer since 1995.

== Offseason ==
=== Transactions ===
==== 2025 ====
- November 4 – acquired right-handed relief pitcher Joey Gerber from the Tampa Bay Rays in exchange for cash considerations.
- November 6 – claimed center fielder and second baseman Ji-hwan Bae off waivers from the Pittsburgh Pirates. The Mets also claimed left-handed relief pitcher José Castillo off waivers from the Baltimore Orioles.
- November 24 – acquired infielder Marcus Semien from the Texas Rangers in exchange for outfielder Brandon Nimmo and cash considerations.
- December 3 – signed right-handed relief pitcher Devin Williams to a three-year, $51 million contract.
- December 5 – claimed right-handed reliever Cooper Criswell off waivers from the Boston Red Sox.
- December 16 – signed infielder and designated hitter Jorge Polanco to a two-year, $40 million contract.
- December 17 – claimed catcher Drew Romo off waivers from the Baltimore Orioles.
- December 22 – signed right-handed relief pitcher Luke Weaver to a two-year, $22 million contract. The Mets also traded infielder Jeff McNeil and cash considerations to the Athletics for minor league pitcher Yordan Rodriguez.

==== 2026 ====
- January 16 – claimed infielder Tsung-Che Cheng off waivers from the Tampa Bay Rays.
- January 20 – signed infielder Bo Bichette to a three-year, $126 million contract including a player option after the 2027 and 2028 seasons. The Mets also acquired center fielder Luis Robert Jr. from the Chicago White Sox in exchange for Luisangel Acuña and minor league prospect Truman Pauley.
- January 21 – signed right-handed relief pitcher Luis García to a one-year, $1.75 million contract. The Mets also acquired right-handed starting pitcher Freddy Peralta and right-hander Tobias Myers from the Milwaukee Brewers in exchange for prospect Jett Williams and right-hander Brandon Sproat.
- January 22 – acquired infielder Vidal Bruján from the Minnesota Twins in exchange for cash considerations.
- February 10 – acquired left-handed relief pitcher Bryan Hudson from the Chicago White Sox in exchange for cash considerations.
- February 12 – signed left fielder MJ Melendez to a one-year, $1.5 million contract.
- February 15 – claimed catcher Ben Rortvedt off waivers from the Los Angeles Dodgers.

== Regular season ==
=== Standings ===
==== National League East ====
NL East
Team	W	L	Pct.	GB	Home	Road
Atlanta Braves	94	68	.580	—	52‍–‍29	42‍–‍39
Philadelphia Phillies	88	74	.543	6	43‍–‍38	45‍–‍36
Miami Marlins	80	82	.494	14	47‍–‍34	33‍–‍48
Washington Nationals	77	85	.475	17	39‍–‍42	38‍–‍43
New York Mets	74	88	.457	20	36‍–‍45	38‍–‍43

==== National League Wild Card ====
Division leaders
Team	W	L	Pct.
Milwaukee Brewers	103	59	.636
Los Angeles Dodgers	100	62	.617
Atlanta Braves	94	68	.580

Wild Card teams (Top 3 teams qualify for postseason)
Team	W	L	Pct.	GB
San Diego Padres	91	71	.562	+3
Chicago Cubs	89	73	.549	+1
Philadelphia Phillies	88	74	.543	—
Arizona Diamondbacks	86	76	.531	2
Pittsburgh Pirates	82	80	.506	6
Miami Marlins	80	82	.494	8
St. Louis Cardinals	77	85	.475	11
Washington Nationals	77	85	.475	11
Cincinnati Reds	75	87	.463	13
New York Mets	74	88	.457	14
San Francisco Giants	65	97	.401	23
Colorado Rockies	58	104	.358	30

=== Record vs. opponents ===
==== Record vs. National League ====
2026 National League record Source: MLB Standings Grid – 2026
Team	AZ	ATL	CHC	CIN	COL	LAD	MIA	MIL	NYM	PHI	PIT	SD	SF	STL	WSH	AL
Arizona	—	4–3	2–4	4–2	9–4	7–6	1–5	2–4	4–2	3–3	3–3	6–7	10–3	5–2	2–4	24–24
Atlanta	3–4	—	3–3	3–3	6–0	5–1	9–4	3–3	6–7	9–4	5–1	3–4	1–5	2–4	9–4	27–21
Chicago	4–2	3–3	—	9–4	3–3	4–2	3–3	4–9	7–0	6–1	7–6	5–1	3–3	6–7	3–3	22–26
Cincinnati	2–4	3–3	4–9	—	4–2	1–6	3–4	4–9	4–2	3–3	6–7	3–3	3–3	5–8	1–5	29–19
Colorado	4–9	0–6	3–3	2–4	—	3–10	2–5	1–5	4–2	2–4	3–3	2–11	7–6	2–4	3–4	20–28
Los Angeles	6–7	1–5	2–4	6–1	10–3	—	2–4	3–4	5–1	4–2	5–1	8–5	9–4	2–4	6–0	31–17
Miami	5–1	4–9	3–3	4–3	5–2	4–2	—	1–5	6–7	5–8	4–2	0–6	4–2	4–2	9–4	22–26
Milwaukee	4–2	3–3	9–4	9–4	5–1	4–3	5–1	—	4–2	4–2	6–7	2–4	3–4	11–2	2–4	32–16
New York	2–4	7–6	0–7	2–4	2–4	1–5	7–6	2–4	—	6–7	4–2	4–2	5–2	2–4	7–6	23–25
Philadelphia	3–3	4–9	1–6	3–3	4–2	2–4	8–5	2–4	7–6	—	5–2	6–0	4–2	4–2	9–4	26–22
Pittsburgh	3–3	1–5	6–7	7–6	3–3	1–5	2–4	7–6	2–4	2–5	—	3–3	3–3	6–7	4–3	32–16
San Diego	7–6	4–3	1–5	3–3	11–2	5–8	6–0	4–2	2–4	0–6	3–3	—	9–4	3–4	4–2	29–19
San Francisco	3–10	5–1	3–3	3–3	6–7	4–9	2–4	4–3	2–5	2–4	3–3	4–9	—	5–1	3–3	16–32
St. Louis	2–5	4–2	7–6	8–5	4–2	4–2	2–4	2–11	4–2	2–4	7–6	4–3	1–5	—	3–3	23–25
Washington	4–2	4–9	3–3	5–1	4–3	0–6	4–9	4–2	6–7	4–9	3–4	2–4	3–3	3–3	—	28–20

Updated with the results of all games through September 27, 2026.

==== Record vs. American League ====
2026 National League record vs. American League Source: MLB Standings
Team	ATH	BAL	BOS	CWS	CLE	DET	HOU	KC	LAA	MIN	NYY	SEA	TB	TEX	TOR
Arizona	2–1	2–1	1–2	1–2	2–1	3–0	2–1	2–1	2–1	1–2	2–1	0–3	0–3	2–4	2–1
Atlanta	2–1	2–1	4–2	1–2	2–1	2–1	3–0	2–1	2–1	0–3	1–2	1–2	1–2	2–1	2–1
Chicago	1–2	2–1	1–2	3–3	1–2	1–2	0–3	2–1	2–1	2–1	1–2	1–2	2–1	1–2	2–1
Cincinnati	3–0	1–2	2–1	2–1	2–4	2–1	2–1	1–2	1–2	3–0	2–1	2–1	2–1	3–0	1–2
Colorado	1–2	2–1	2–1	1–2	0–3	0–3	4–2	3–0	2–1	1–2	0–3	1–2	0–3	1–2	2–1
Los Angeles	2–1	1–2	0–3	1–2	1–2	2–1	2–1	3–0	5–1	3–0	2–1	2–1	3–0	2–1	2–1
Miami	3–0	1–2	1–2	2–1	0–3	0–3	0–3	2–1	2–1	1–2	1–2	3–0	3–3	2–1	1–2
Milwaukee	1–2	3–0	1–2	3–0	2–1	1–2	2–1	2–1	2–1	4–2	3–0	2–1	2–1	2–1	2–1
New York	0–3	0–3	0–3	1–2	3–0	3–0	1–2	2–1	2–1	2–1	3–3	1–2	2–1	2–1	1–2
Philadelphia	2–1	2–1	2–1	2–1	1–2	2–1	1–2	1–2	3–0	3–0	1–2	1–2	1–2	1–2	3–3
Pittsburgh	2–1	3–0	2–1	3–0	2–1	3–3	2–1	3–0	2–1	3–0	1–2	2–1	2–1	1–2	1–2
San Diego	2–1	2–1	2–1	1–2	2–1	1–2	2–1	1–2	2–1	3–0	2–1	6–0	0–3	1–2	2–1
San Francisco	4–2	1–2	0–3	2–1	1–2	1–2	1–2	0–3	2–1	1–2	0–3	1–2	0–3	1–2	1–2
St. Louis	2–1	1–2	1–2	2–1	2–1	1–2	3–0	3–3	1–2	1–2	2–1	0–3	2–1	1–2	1–2
Washington	2–1	4–2	2–1	2–1	2–1	2–1	2–1	2–1	3–0	2–1	0–3	2–1	1–2	1–2	1–2

Updated with the results of all games through September 27, 2026.

=== Season summary ===
==== March–April ====
On March 26, the Mets opened up with an 11–7 win against the Pittsburgh Pirates, tied for second-most run scored on Opening Day in Mets history. The Mets scored five runs in the first inning off reigning 2025 NL Cy Young Award winner Paul Skenes. On March 28, the Mets and Pirates were both held scoreless in the ninth and each scored a run in the tenth; while the Pirates did take a 2–1 lead in the middle of the 11th, Luis Robert Jr. hit a walk-off home run to give the Mets the 4–2 victory, winning their first series of the year. However, the Mets lost their series finale to the Pirates on March 29 in their second consecutive extra innings game. While the Mets won their first game against the Cardinals, they dropped their next two to fall to 3–3, scoring just one run in their two losses. While the Mets dropped their opener to the San Francisco Giants on April 2, they won the next three to win the series, including coming back from a 2–1 deficit after 7 innings in the finale on April 5. Following this, however, the Mets lost a series to the Arizona Diamondbacks after winning the first game. The Mets losing streak was extended to eight after getting swept by the Athletics and Los Angeles Dodgers. After losing 12–4 to the Chicago Cubs on April 17, the Mets had lost nine straight games, the Mets longest losing streak since 2004. By April 18, the Mets had lost their tenth straight game, losing 4–2 to the Cubs. This was the longest losing streak in April of any MLB team since the 2023 Chicago White Sox. Additionally, their record fell to 7–14; the worst in the National League, and the Mets worst start since starting 6–15 in 1983. The Mets losing streak was extended to 11 on April 19 as they got walked off in a 2–1 loss in the finale to the Cubs, despite holding a 1–0 lead entering the ninth inning. Despite jumping out to an early 3–0 on their April 21 game against the Minnesota Twins, the Mets blew that lead and ultimately lost their 12th consecutive game, their longest losing streak since 2002. Additionally, the loss combined with a win from the Kansas City Royals gave the Mets sole possession of the worst record in baseball, at 7–16. The beginning of the streak coincided with Mr. Met and Mrs. Met hugging New York City Mayor Zohran Mamdani on video, leading some to call it the Mamdani Curse. They finally snapped the losing streak at 12 on April 22 by beating the Twins. The Mets then beat the Twins 10–8 on April 23 to win the series. However, the Mets finished April by getting swept by the Colorado Rockies and losing a series to the Washington Nationals, finishing the month at 10-21, the worst record in MLB.

==== May ====
The Mets begun May by winning series against both the Los Angeles Angels and Rockies, successfully winning consecutive series for the first time all year. However, their trip ended with a series loss to the Diamondbacks. This put the Mets record at 15–25, the worst team in MLB through the first quarter of the season. The team called up centerfield prospect AJ Ewing from AAA in time for the Tiger series and immediately began playing better. They swept the Detroit Tigers, and for the first time in franchise history, the Mets completed a multi-run comeback in every game in a sweep of at least 3 games. This was also the first victorious sweep all year for the Mets. In the Citi Field portion of the 2026 Subway Series against the New York Yankees, the New York Mets lost the opener 5–2 before responding with back-to-back wins to take the series. The Game One loss was particularly painful, as Mets' starting pitcher Clay Holmes, who had been putting up Cy Young-type numbers, had his leg broken by a screaming line drive off the bat of Yankees' rookie Spencer Jones, knocking Holmes out of major league action until August. The Mets won the second game 6–3 behind three RBIs from Mark Vientos and strong relief pitching from former Yankee Luke Weaver, then won the finale 7–6 in 10 innings after Tyrone Taylor hit a game-tying three-run homer in the ninth inning. Rookie Carson Benge delivered the walk-off hit in the 10th inning, his second walk-off hit of the season. This was the first time the Mets successfully came back when down after 8 innings since Game 3 of the 2024 National League Wild Card Series. However, the momentum stopped there. The Mets called up another outfielder from AAA, Nick Morabito leading into the Washington series. Morabito, who profiles as a potential fourth outfielder, was overmatched, and was back in AAA within weeks. During the series with the Nats, however, the team called up starting LHP Zac Thornton, who provided much-needed help for the pitching staff. The Mets followed up their brief home winning streak with a poor road trip, splitting with the Washington Nationals and getting swept by the Miami Marlins, putting their record at 22-31 right before Memorial Day.

=== Game log ===
Legend
Mets Win	Mets Loss	Game Postponed	Eliminated from playoff race
Bold = Mets team member

2026 Game Log
Overall: 74–88 (Home: 36–45; Away: 38–43)
March/April: 10–21 (Home: 6–12; Away: 4–9)

#	Date	Opponent	Box Score	Win	Loss	Save	Location (Attendance)	Record
1	March 26	Pirates	11–7	**Peralta** (1–0)	Skenes (0–1)	―	**Citi Field** (41,449)	1–0
2	March 28	Pirates	4–2 (11)	**Lovelady** (1–0)	Barco (0–1)	―	**Citi Field** (37,183)	2–0
3	March 29	Pirates	3–4 (10)	Santana (1–0)	**Lovelady** (1–1)	―	**Citi Field** (36,940)	2–1
4	March 30	@ Cardinals	4–2	**Holmes** (1–0)	Leahy (0–1)	**Williams** (1)	Busch Stadium (21,307)	3–1
5	March 31	@ Cardinals	0–3	Pallante (1–0)	**Senga** (0–1)	O'Brien (1)	Busch Stadium (22,823)	3–2
6	April 1	@ Cardinals	1–2 (11)	Graceffo (1–0)	**Myers** (0–1)	―	Busch Stadium (21,684)	3–3
7	April 2	@ Giants	2–7	Ray (1–1)	**Peterson** (0–1)	Tidwell (1)	Oracle Park (32,073)	3–4
8	April 3	@ Giants	10–3	**McLean** (1–0)	Mahle (0–2)	―	Oracle Park (38,613)	4–4
9	April 4	@ Giants	9–0	**Holmes** (2–0)	Roupp (1–1)	―	Oracle Park (36,553)	5–4
10	April 5	@ Giants	5–2	**Brazobán** (1–0)	Winn (0–1)	**Williams** (2)	Oracle Park (37,079)	6–4
11	April 7	Diamondbacks	4–3 (10)	**Weaver** (1–0)	Sewald (0–2)	―	**Citi Field** (34,753)	7–4
12	April 8	Diamondbacks	2–7	Nelson (1–1)	**Peterson** (0–2)	―	**Citi Field** (33,422)	7–5
13	April 9	Diamondbacks	1–7	Rodríguez (1–0)	**McLean** (1–1)	―	**Citi Field** (35,783)	7–6
14	April 10	Athletics	0–4	Perkins (1–0)	**Holmes** (2–1)	―	**Citi Field** (36,349)	7–7
15	April 11	Athletics	6–11	Lopez (1–1)	**Senga** (0–2)	―	**Citi Field** (38,244)	7–8
16	April 12	Athletics	0–1	Civale (2–0)	**Peralta** (1–1)	Kuhnel (2)	**Citi Field** (37,316)	7–9
17	April 13	@ Dodgers	0–4	Wrobleski (2–0)	**Peterson** (0–3)	―	Dodger Stadium (52,838)	7–10
18	April 14	@ Dodgers	1–2	Treinen (1–0)	**Raley** (0–1)	Vesia (2)	Dodger Stadium (48,138)	7–11
19	April 15	@ Dodgers	2–8	Ohtani (2–0)	**Holmes** (2–2)	―	Dodger Stadium (50,909)	7–12
20	April 17	@ Cubs	4–12	Cabrera (2–0)	**Senga** (0–3)	–	Wrigley Field (34,282)	7–13
21	April 18	@ Cubs	2–4	Taillon (1–1)	**Peralta** (1–2)	Thielbar (1)	Wrigley Field (36,189)	7–14
22	April 19	@ Cubs	1–2 (10)	Thielbar (2–2)	**Kimbrel** (0–1)	―	Wrigley Field (35,497)	7–15
23	April 21	Twins	3–5	Sands (1–1)	**Williams** (0–1)	―	**Citi Field** (32,798)	7–16
24	April 22	Twins	3–2	**Weaver** (2–0)	Rogers (0–1)	―	**Citi Field** (32,665)	8–16
25	April 23	Twins	10–8	**Williams** (1–1)	Morris (0–1)	―	**Citi Field** (34,253)	9–16
26	April 24	Rockies	3–4	Lorenzen (2–2)	**Peralta** (1–3)	Senzatela (2)	**Citi Field** (36,233)	9–17
―	April 25	Rockies	**Postponed (rain)** (Makeup date: April 26)					
27	April 26 (1)	Rockies	1–3	Quintana (1–2)	**McLean** (1–2)	Vodnik (4)	**Citi Field** (38,155)	9–18
28	April 26 (2)	Rockies	0–3	Dollander (3–2)	**Senga** (0–4)	Agnos (2)	**Citi Field** (38,155)	9–19
29	April 28	Nationals	8–0	**Holmes** (3–2)	Littell (0–4)	―	**Citi Field** (33,622)	10–19
30	April 29	Nationals	2–14	Cavalli (1–1)	**Peterson** (0–4)	―	**Citi Field** (32,624)	10–20
31	April 30	Nationals	4–5	Parker (2–0)	**Weaver** (2–1)	Varland (3)	**Citi Field** (34,621)	10–21

May: 16–12 (Home: 9–3; Away: 7–9)

#	Date	Opponent	Box Score	Win	Loss	Save	Location (Attendance)	Record
32	May 1	@ Angels	4–3	**Brazobán** (2–0)	Fermín (0–1)	**Williams** (3)	Angel Stadium (43,959)	11–21
33	May 2	@ Angels	3–4 (10)	Zeferjahn (2–1)	**Warren** (0–1)	―	Angel Stadium (42,788)	11–22
34	May 3	@ Angels	5–1	**Holmes** (4–2)	Kochanowicz (2–1)	―	Angel Stadium (41,614)	12–22
35	May 4	@ Rockies	4–2	**Peterson** (1–4)	Sugano (3–2)	**Williams** (4)	Coors Field (15,564)	13–22
―	May 5	@ Rockies	**Postponed (snow)** (Makeup date: May 7)					
36	May 6	@ Rockies	10–5	**Peralta** (2–3)	Lorenzen (2–4)	**Williams** (5)	Coors Field (11,155)	14–22
37	May 7	@ Rockies	2–6	Senzatela (2–0)	**Kimbrel** (0–2)	―	Coors Field (13,378)	14–23
38	May 8	@ Diamondbacks	3–1 (10)	**Williams** (2–1)	Ginkel (1–2)	**Myers** (1)	Chase Field (30,599)	15–23
39	May 9	@ Diamondbacks	1–2	Kelly (2–3)	**Holmes** (4–3)	Sewald (8)	Chase Field (38,726)	15–24
40	May 10	@ Diamondbacks	1–5	Rodríguez (4–0)	**Brazobán** (2–1)	―	Chase Field (40,170)	15–25
41	May 12	Tigers	10–2	**Peralta** (3–3)	Flaherty (0–4)	―	**Citi Field** (36,382)	16–25
42	May 13	Tigers	3–2 (10)	**Raley** (1–1)	Anderson (1–1)	―	**Citi Field** (33,989)	17–25
43	May 14	Tigers	9–4	**McLean** (2–2)	Montero (2–3)	―	**Citi Field** (34,642)	18–25
44	May 15	Yankees	2–5	Schlittler (6–1)	**Holmes** (4–4)	―	**Citi Field** (40,004)	18–26
45	May 16	Yankees	6–3	**Peterson** (2–4)	Rodón (0–1)	**Williams** (6)	**Citi Field** (41,067)	19–26
46	May 17	Yankees	7–6 (10)	**Williams** (3–1)	Hill (0–1)	―	**Citi Field** (40,232)	20–26
47	May 18	@ Nationals	16–7 (12)	**Brazobán** (3–1)	Schultz (0–1)	―	Nationals Park (15,901)	21–26
48	May 19	@ Nationals	6–9	Griffin (5–2)	**McLean** (2–3)	Lovelady (3)	Nationals Park (22,754)	21–27
49	May 20	@ Nationals	4–8	Littell (3–4)	**Thornton** (0–1)	Alvarez (1)	Nationals Park (18,642)	21–28
50	May 21	@ Nationals	2–1	**Peterson** (3–4)	Cavalli (2–3)	**Williams** (7)	Nationals Park (17,291)	22–28
51	May 22	@ Marlins	1–2	Pérez (3–6)	**Manaea** (0–1)	Fairbanks (6)	LoanDepot Park (17,095)	22–29
52	May 23	@ Marlins	1–4	Meyer (5–0)	**Peralta** (3–4)	―	LoanDepot Park (21,071)	22–30
53	May 24	@ Marlins	0–4	Fairbanks (2–2)	**Williams** (3–2)	―	LoanDepot Park (23,018)	22–31
54	May 25	Reds	2–7	Lodolo (1–1)	**McLean** (2–4)	―	**Citi Field** (36,734)	22–32
55	May 26	Reds	2–7	Burns (7–1)	**Peterson** (3–5)	―	**Citi Field** (36,848)	22–33
56	May 27	Reds	4–2	**Tong** (1–0)	Abbott (4–3)	**Williams** (8)	**Citi Field** (33,453)	23–33
57	May 29	Marlins	9–7 (10)	**Warren** (1–1)	Fairbanks (2–3)	―	**Citi Field** (39,386)	24–33
58	May 30	Marlins	6–1	**Scott** (1–0)	Phillips (0–1)	―	**Citi Field** (38,552)	25–33
59	May 31	Marlins	10–1	**McLean** (3–4)	King (1–1)	**Peterson** (1)	**Citi Field** (40,634)	26–33

June: 10–17 (Home: 4–9; Away: 6–8)

#	Date	Opponent	Box Score	Win	Loss	Save	Location (Attendance)	Record
60	June 1	@ Mariners	2–3 (10)	Speier (1–2)	**Minter** (0–1)	―	T-Mobile Park (23,037)	26–34
61	June 2	@ Mariners	3–8	Gilbert (4–4)	**Tong** (1–1)	―	T-Mobile Park (28,329)	26–35
62	June 3	@ Mariners	7–1	**Peralta** (4–4)	Kirby (5–5)	―	T-Mobile Park (27,969)	27–35
63	June 5	@ Padres	5–0	**Scott** (2–0)	King (4–5)	―	Petco Park (42,159)	28–35
64	June 6	@ Padres	2–3	Rodríguez (1–2)	**Warren** (1–2)	Miller (18)	Petco Park (40,770)	28–36
65	June 7	@ Padres	7–3	**Manaea** (1–1)	Vásquez (5–4)	―	Petco Park (41,159)	29–36
66	June 9	Cardinals	0–7	May (4–6)	**Peralta** (4–5)	―	**Citi Field** (35,175)	29–37
67	June 10	Cardinals	2–9	Pallante (7–4)	**Warren** (1–3)	―	**Citi Field** (34,238)	29–38
68	June 11	Cardinals	5–4	**Raley** (2–1)	Romero (0–2)	**Williams** (9)	**Citi Field** (37,019)	30–38
69	June 12	Braves	7–5	**Pérez** (3–3)	Strider (4–2)	**Williams** (10)	**Citi Field** (38,438)	31–38
70	June 13	Braves	1–3	Pérez (5–3)	**Manaea** (1–2)	Iglesias (14)	**Citi Field** (38,269)	31–39
71	June 14	Braves	8–1	**Peralta** (5–5)	Elder (5–4)	―	**Citi Field** (40,106)	32–39
72	June 15	@ Reds	0–12	Burns (8–1)	**Myers** (0–2)	―	Great American Ball Park (19,853)	32–40
73	June 16	@ Reds	3–5	Singer (3–6)	**Senga** (0–5)	Santillan (4)	Great American Ball Park (28,710)	32–41
74	June 17	@ Reds	9–1	**McLean** (4–4)	Lodolo (2–2)	―	Great American Ball Park (27,207)	33–41
75	June 18	@ Phillies	6–4	**Brazobán** (4–1)	Alvarado (3–2)	**Williams** (11)	Citizens Bank Park (39,767)	34–41
76	June 20	@ Phillies	3–15	Sánchez (9–3)	**Peralta** (5–6)	―	Citizens Bank Park (43,402)	34–42
77	June 21	@ Phillies	2–6	Wheeler (7–1)	**Peterson** (3–6)	―	Citizens Bank Park (41,552)	34–43
―	June 22	Cubs	**Postponed (rain)** (Makeup date: June 24)					
78	June 23	Cubs	6–9	Cabrera (5–4)	**Senga** (0–6)	―	**Citi Field** (35,668)	34–44
79	June 24 (1)	Cubs	3–10	Assad (6–1)	**McLean** (4–5)	―	**Citi Field** (31,951)	34–45
80	June 24 (2)	Cubs	5–10	Imanaga (5–6)	**Raley** (2–2)	―	**Citi Field** (33,934)	34–46
81	June 25	Cubs	3–4 (10)	Webb (2–2)	**Raley** (2–3)	Thornton (1)	**Citi Field** (36,035)	34–47
82	June 26	Phillies	1–2	Wheeler (8–1)	**Brazobán** (4–2)	Durán (20)	**Citi Field** (39,077)	34–48
83	June 27	Phillies	6–2	**Minter** (1–1)	Rangel (0–1)	―	**Citi Field** (37,338)	35–48
84	June 28	Phillies	4–5	Backhus (1–0)	**Senga** (0–7)	Durán (21)	**Citi Field** (38,770)	35–49
85	June 29	@ Blue Jays	1–2	Yesavage (4–3)	**Manaea** (1–3)	Varland (17)	Rogers Centre (41,634)	35–50
86	June 30	@ Blue Jays	3–0	**McLean** (5–5)	Gausman (4–7)	**Williams** (12)	Rogers Centre (41,538)	36–50

July: 11–14 (Home: 6–8; Away: 5–6)

#	Date	Opponent	Box Score	Win	Loss	Save	Location (Attendance)	Record
87	July 1	@ Blue Jays	3–9	Miles (4–1)	**Peralta** (5–7)	Corbin (1)	Rogers Centre (41,842)	36–51
88	July 3	@ Braves	3–5	Holmes (5–4)	**Scott** (2–1)	Iglesias (17)	Truist Park (39,138)	36–52
89	July 4	@ Braves	3–14	Sale (9–6)	**Manaea** (1–4)	Ritchie (1)	Truist Park (40,168)	36–53
90	July 5	@ Braves	10–9	**McLean** (6–5)	Pérez (6–6)	**Williams** (13)	Truist Park (28,621)	37–53
91	July 6	@ Braves	7–6 (10)	**Raley** (3–3)	Murphy (0–1)	**Weaver** (1)	Truist Park (31,445)	38–53
92	July 7	Royals	12–16	Way (1–0)	**Seelinger** (0–1)	–	**Citi Field** (32,734)	38–54
93	July 8	Royals	6–2	**Raley** (4–3)	Lange (0–5)	–	**Citi Field** (32,227)	39–54
94	July 9	Royals	7–3	**Manaea** (2–4)	Wacha (5–7)	–	**Citi Field** (33,868)	40–54
95	July 10	Red Sox	2–6	Gray (11–1)	**McLean** (6–6)	–	**Citi Field** (38,090)	40–55
96	July 11	Red Sox	0–4	Morán (2–2)	**Peralta** (5–8)	–	**Citi Field** (38,371)	40–56
97	July 12	Red Sox	2–3 (10)	Chapman (1–3)	**Raley** (4–4)	Whitlock (2)	**Citi Field** (37,638)	40–57
**96th All-Star Game in Philadelphia, Pennsylvania**
98	July 16	@ Phillies	4–1	**Scott** (3–1)	Nola (3–7)	**Williams** (14)	Citizens Bank Park (40,109)	41–57
99	July 18	@ Phillies	1–6	Luzardo (9–4)	**Manaea** (2–5)	–	Citizens Bank Park (41,133)	41–58
100	July 19	@ Phillies	6–1	**McLean** (7–6)	Rangel (0–3)	–	Citizens Bank Park (40,132)	42–58
101	July 20	@ Brewers	3–8	Yoho (2–0)	**Peralta** (5–9)	–	American Family Field (34,073)	42–59
102	July 21	@ Brewers	4–0	**Thornton** (1–1)	Sproat (3–5)	–	American Family Field (30,016)	43–59
103	July 22	@ Brewers	3–4	Henderson (4–1)	**Scott** (3–2)	Megill (16)	American Family Field (38,319)	43–60
104	July 24	Dodgers	2–4	Sasaki (4–5)	**Raley** (4–5)	Scott (16)	**Citi Field** (35,338)	43–61
105	July 25	Dodgers	3–4	Yamamoto (11–6)	**McLean** (7–7)	Stewart (1)	**Citi Field** (36,356)	43–62
106	July 26	Dodgers	8–3	**Pérez** (4–3)	Phillips (0–2)	–	**Citi Field** (34,566)	44–62
107	July 27	Braves	14–3	**Thornton** (2–1)	Thomas (0–1)	–	**Citi Field** (29,466)	45–62
―	July 28	Braves	**Postponed (rain)** (Makeup date: July 29)					
108	July 29 (1)	Braves	3–2	**Brazobán** (5–2)	Dodd (2–1)	**Williams** (15)	**Citi Field** (28,493)	46–62
109	July 29 (2)	Braves	0–1	Sale (12–6)	**Scott** (3–3)	Iglesias (22)	**Citi Field** (22,672)	46–63
110	July 30	Marlins	4–2	**Raley** (5–5)	Petersen (1–2)	**Williams** (16)	**Citi Field** (25,774)	47–63
111	July 31	Marlins	2–5	Junk (5–6)	**Senga** (0–8)	Fairbanks (16)	**Citi Field** (33,064)	47–64

August: 15–12 (Home: 7–7; Away: 8–5)

#	Date	Opponent	Box Score	Win	Loss	Save	Location (Attendance)	Record
112	August 1	Marlins	2–6	Phillips (3–5)	**Thornton** (2–2)	Bachar (2)	**Citi Field** (30,078)	47–65
113	August 2	Marlins	0–2	Alcántara (12–6)	**Stock** (0–1)	Fairbanks (17)	**Citi Field** (32,109)	47–66
114	August 4	@ Guardians	6–2	**Manaea** (3–5)	Cantillo (8–7)	–	Progressive Field (24,636)	48–66
115	August 5	@ Guardians	6–5 (10)	**McDermott** (1–0)	Festa (2–3)	**Duarte** (1)	Progressive Field (29,033)	49–66
116	August 6	@ Guardians	13–6	**McLean** (8–7)	Griffin (12–4)	–	Progressive Field (26,764)	50–66
117	August 7	@ Pirates	6–4	**Thornton** (3–2)	Mlodzinski (6–4)	–	PNC Park (33,497)	51–66
118	August 8	@ Pirates	0–9	Chandler (5–8)	**Stock** (0–2)	–	PNC Park (30,121)	51–67
119	August 9	@ Pirates	11–1	**Manaea** (4–5)	Jones (2–4)	–	PNC Park (22,753)	52–67
120	August 10	@ Braves	8–5	**Duarte** (1–0)	Elder (8–7)	**Senga** (1)	Truist Park (28,402)	53–67
121	August 11	@ Braves	0–4	Pérez (8–6)	**McLean** (8–8)	–	Truist Park (24,711)	53–68
122	August 12	@ Braves	3–6	Mahle (4–9)	**Thornton** (3–3)	–	Truist Park (26,415)	53–69
123	August 14	Nationals	4–1	**Pintaro** (1–0)	Alvarez (2–4)	**Senga** (2)	**Citi Field** (30,660)	54–69
124	August 15	Nationals	5–4	**Yan** (1–0)	Cruz (0–1)	–	**Citi Field** (34,737)	55–69
125	August 16	Nationals	4–3	**Scott** (4–3)	Irvin (2–7)	**Senga** (3)	**Citi Field** (28,624)	56–69
126	August 17	Padres	2–1	**McLean** (9–8)	Buehler (7–6)	**Duarte** (2)	**Citi Field** (27,842)	57–69
127	August 18	Padres	2–5	Ray (11–7)	**Thornton** (3–4)	Miller (31)	**Citi Field** (35,508)	57–70
128	August 19	Padres	4–2	**Lavender** (1–0)	King (8–9)	**Senga** (4)	**Citi Field** (26,195)	58–70
129	August 21	@ White Sox	4–6	Taylor (5–2)	**Yan** (1–1)	–	Rate Field (31,599)	58–71
130	August 22	@ White Sox	10–5	**Warren** (2–3)	Castillo (4–10)	–	Rate Field (30,705)	59–71
131	August 23	@ White Sox	1–2	Taylor (6–2)	**Senga** (0–9)	–	Rate Field (27,721)	59–72
132	August 25	Brewers	3–2 (10)	**Pintaro** (2–0)	Megill (2–3)	–	**Citi Field** (28,942)	60–72
133	August 26	Brewers	1–8	Gasser (4–5)	**Stock** (0–3)	–	**Citi Field** (23,607)	60–73
134	August 27	Brewers	2–8	Misiorowski (14–5)	**Manaea** (4–6)	–	**Citi Field** (26,611)	60–74
135	August 28	Astros	1–3	Brown (4–3)	**Scott** (4–4)	Hader (20)	**Citi Field** (28,848)	60–75
136	August 29	Astros	6–2	**McLean** (10–8)	Javier (1–5)	–	**Citi Field** (29,183)	61–75
137	August 30	Astros	3–6	Pecko (1–0)	**Pintaro** (2–1)	Hader (21)	**Citi Field** (25,227)	61–76
138	August 31	@ Rays	3–2	**Stock** (1–3)	Seymour (9–6)	**Senga** (5)	Tropicana Field (13,618)	62–76

September: 12–12 (Home: 4–6; Away: 8–6)

#	Date	Opponent	Box Score	Win	Loss	Save	Location (Attendance)	Record
139	September 1	@ Rays	2–6	Peralta (7–11)	**Manaea** (4–7)	–	Tropicana Field (16,850)	62–77
140	September 2	@ Rays	10–4	**Núñez** (1–0)	Jax (6–10)	–	Tropicana Field (14,431)	63–77
141	September 4	Giants	10–6	**McLean** (11–8)	Wilkinson (0–3)	–	**Citi Field** (29,377)	64–77
142	September 5	Giants	5–9	Molina (3–0)	**Thornton** (3–5)	–	**Citi Field** (30,046)	64–78
143	September 6	Giants	4–2	**Myers** (1–2)	Seymour (0–2)	**Senga** (6)	**Citi Field** (29,410)	65–78
144	September 7	@ Marlins	9–4	**Tong** (2–1)	Pérez (7–11)	–	LoanDepot Park (16,007)	66–78
145	September 8	@ Marlins	7–5	**Manaea** (5–7)	Alcántara (13–10)	**Senga** (7)	LoanDepot Park (9,470)	67–78
146	September 9	@ Marlins	15–14	**Duarte** (2–0)	Ekness (1–3)	**Myers** (2)	LoanDepot Park (10,955)	68–78
147	September 11	@ Yankees	4–6	Rodón (6–3)	**McLean** (11–9)	Bednar (33)	Yankee Stadium (47,410)	68–79
148	September 12	@ Yankees	12–2	**Thornton** (4–5)	Cole (8–9)	–	Yankee Stadium (46,864)	69–79
149	September 13	@ Yankees	0–2	Schlittler (14–6)	**Scott** (4–5)	Bednar (34)	Yankee Stadium (45,508)	69–80
150	September 14	Orioles	1–2	Canó (3–3)	**Núñez** (1–1)	Garcia (9)	**Citi Field** (35,800)	69–81
151	September 15	Orioles	5–7 (11)	Hoppe (1–1)	**Pintaro** (2–2)	Kittredge (10)	**Citi Field** (28,097)	69–82
152	September 16	Orioles	1–7	Bassitt (8–5)	**Curry** (0–1)	–	**Citi Field** (25,324)	69–83
153	September 17	Phillies	0–3	Nola (7–10)	**McLean** (11–10)	Durán (32)	**Citi Field** (32,044)	69–84
154	September 18	Phillies	6–3	**Thornton** (5–5)	Mayza (3–4)	**Núñez** (1)	**Citi Field** (29,764)	70–84
155	September 19	Phillies	10–3	**Yan** (2–1)	Painter (3–10)	–	**Citi Field** (37,468)	71–84
156	September 20	Phillies	2–7	Sánchez (18–6)	**Tong** (2–2)	–	**Citi Field** (33,611)	71–85
157	September 22	@ Rangers	6–3	**Manaea** (6–7)	Eovaldi (11–10)	**Senga** (8)	Globe Life Field (24,191)	72–85
158	September 23	@ Rangers	7–2	**McLean** (12–10)	Latz (3–4)	―	Globe Life Field (30,188)	73–85
159	September 24	@ Rangers	1–3	Rocker (6–11)	**Thornton** (5–6)	Montgomery (1)	Globe Life Field (25,320)	73–86
160	September 25	@ Nationals	6–7	Varland (2–2)	**Pintaro** (2–3)	Gray (1)	Nationals Park (28,639)	73–87
161	September 26	@ Nationals	7–1	**Núñez** (2–1)	Irvin (2–10)	―	Nationals Park (27,284)	74–87
162	September 27	@ Nationals	4–6	Dion (3–2)	**Manaea** (6–8)	Tolman (5)	Nationals Park (23,753)	74–88

== Roster ==
2026 New York Mets
Roster
Pitchers: 43 Huascar Brazobán; 53 Xzavion Curry; 56 Chris Devenski; 54 Daniel Duarte; 52 Carl Edwards Jr.; 40 Luis García; 56 Joey Gerber; 47 Justin Hagenman; 57 Kevin Herget; 35 Clay Holmes; 46 Craig Kimbrel; 94 Nate Lavender; 55 Richard Lovelady; 59 Sean Manaea; 43 Chayce McDermott; 26 Nolan McLean; 33 A. J. Minter; 32 Tobias Myers; 72 Dedniel Núñez; 51 Freddy Peralta; 52 Cionel Pérez; 23 David Peterson; 91 Jonathan Pintaro; 25 Brooks Raley; 66 Dylan Ross; 45 Christian Scott; 73 Matt Seelinger; 34 Kodai Senga; 89 Robert Stock; 49 Zac Thornton; 21 Jonah Tong; 44 Austin Warren; 30 Luke Weaver; 82 Jack Weisenburger; 38 Devin Williams; 84 Jefry Yan; 46 Guillo Zuñiga	Catchers: 4 Francisco Álvarez; 6 Hayden Senger; 13 Luis Torrens; Infielders: 25 Gabriel Arias; 7 Brett Baty; 19 Bo Bichette; 2 Vidal Bruján; 12 Francisco Lindor; 0 Ronny Mauricio; 11 Jorge Polanco; 10 Marcus Semien; 40 Zack Short; 27 Mark Vientos; 39 Eric Wagaman; 29 Jared Young	Outfielders: 3 Carson Benge; 9 A. J. Ewing; 77 Andy Ibáñez; 1 MJ Melendez; 8,55 Nick Morabito; 28 Christopher Morel; 71 Cristian Pache; 39 Tommy Pham; 88 Luis Robert Jr.; 40 Austin Slater; 22 Juan Soto; 15,28 Tyrone Taylor	Manager: 70 Andy Green; 64 Carlos Mendoza; Coaches: 61 Jeff Albert (hitting); 68 J. P. Arencibia (catching); 79 Danny Barnes (quality control); 50 Kai Correa (bench); 80 Rafael Fernandez (assistant hitting); 65 Gilbert Gomez (first base and outfield); 78 Eric Langill (bullpen catcher); 63 Tim Leiper (third base and infield); 90 Kevin Mahoney (batting practice pitcher); 76 Dan McKinney (assistant pitching); 77 Dave Racaniello (bullpen catcher); 67 José Rosado (bullpen); 60 Troy Snitker (hitting); 62 Justin Willard (pitching)

== Player statistics ==
Updated as of 27 September 2026

=== Batting ===
= Indicates team leader in category (Note: To qualify as a team leader in AVG, OBP, SLG, or OPS, a player must have 3.1 plate appearances per team game.)

Note: G = Games played; AB = At bats; R = Runs; H = Hits; 2B = Doubles; 3B = Triples; HR = Home runs; RBI = Runs batted in; SB = Stolen bases; CS = Caught stealing; BB = Walks; SO = Strikeouts; AVG = Batting average; OBP = On-base percentage; SLG = Slugging percentage; OPS = On-base plus slugging

Player	G	AB	R	H	2B	3B	HR	RBI	SB	CS	BB	SO	AVG	OBP	SLG	OPS
Francisco Álvarez	113	373	38	87	14	0	16	43	0	0	39	129	.233	.311	.399	.710
Jared Young	103	308	46	82	17	3	9	39	3	1	25	63	.266	.330	.429	.759
Marcus Semien	139	494	55	106	15	1	15	49	10	3	45	104	.215	.280	.340	.620
Francisco Lindor	105	418	63	94	12	4	21	49	3	2	46	95	.225	.309	.423	.733
Bo Bichette	160	638	76	166	25	2	18	78	2	2	49	127	.260	.312	.390	.702
Juan Soto	111	400	63	110	11	2	27	68	9	3	78	65	.275	.393	.515	.908
A. J. Ewing	120	436	55	110	19	1	11	43	25	8	46	125	.252	.324	.376	.700
Carson Benge	156	595	86	168	22	3	20	65	22	5	50	142	.282	.346	.430	.776
Jorge Polanco	37	135	7	20	5	0	2	6	0	0	9	36	.148	.201	.230	.431
Brett Baty	143	420	53	99	22	1	11	56	5	1	44	125	.236	.309	.371	.681
Mark Vientos	87	274	28	58	11	0	13	41	0	0	15	71	.212	.258	.394	.652
Luis Torrens	91	255	37	60	14	0	9	41	1	0	18	59	.235	.295	.396	.691
Luis Robert Jr.	58	193	24	43	4	0	10	23	2	3	23	53	.223	.303	.399	.702
Tyrone Taylor	67	145	22	35	8	0	10	28	0	2	9	31	.241	.290	.503	.794
MJ Melendez	56	120	14	23	5	1	4	11	0	1	17	50	.192	.315	.350	.665
Ronny Mauricio	20	59	7	13	1	0	4	8	0	0	2	20	.220	.258	.441	.699
Eric Wagaman	26	47	5	9	0	0	2	5	0	0	4	12	.191	.269	.319	.588
Nick Morabito	19	41	4	8	2	0	0	4	1	2	3	16	.195	.283	.244	.527
Christopher Morel	14	30	3	6	1	0	1	5	0	0	2	7	.200	.250	.333	.583
Austin Slater	9	20	3	5	1	0	0	1	0	0	1	6	.250	.286	.300	.586
Hayden Senger	7	15	2	2	0	0	1	2	0	0	0	4	.133	.133	.333	.467
Zack Short	6	14	1	1	0	0	0	0	0	0	1	7	.071	.133	.071	.205
Tommy Pham	9	13	1	0	0	0	0	0	0	0	1	7	.000	.071	.000	.071
Vidal Bruján	9	11	4	1	0	0	0	1	0	1	1	1	.091	.167	.091	.258
Cristian Pache	15	8	2	1	0	0	0	0	0	0	0	4	.125	.125	.125	.250
Andy Ibáñez	3	6	0	0	0	0	0	2	0	0	0	1	.000	.000	.000	.000
Gabriel Arias	2	5	0	0	0	0	0	0	0	0	0	1	.000	.000	.000	.000
Kodai Senga	1	0	0	0	0	0	0	0	0	0	0	0	.000	.000	.000	.000
Austin Warren	1	0	0	0	0	0	0	0	0	0	0	0	.000	.000	.000	.000
Luke Weaver	1	0	0	0	0	0	0	0	0	0	0	0	.000	.000	.000	.000
Devin Williams	1	0	0	0	0	0	0	0	0	0	0	0	.000	.000	.000	.000
Team totals	162	5473	699	1307	209	18	204	668	83	34	528	1361	.239	.310	.395	.705
Rank in 15 NL teams	—	6	13	12	15	11	5	13	14	9	11	11	14	12	13	13

Source: Baseball Reference

=== Pitching ===
= Indicates team leader in category (Note: To qualify as a team leader in ERA or WHIP, a player must have 1.0 IP per team game.)

Note: W = Wins; L = Losses; ERA = Earned run average; G = Games pitched; GS = Games started; SV = Saves; IP = Innings pitched; H = Hits allowed; R = Runs allowed; ER = Earned runs allowed; HR = Home runs allowed; BB = Walks allowed (bases on balls); SO = Strikeouts; HBP = Hit by pitch; WHIP = Walks + hits per inning pitched

Player	W	L	ERA	G	GS	SV	IP	H	R	ER	HR	BB	SO	HBP	WHIP
Nolan McLean	12	10	3.16	31	31	0	179.2	140	75	63	17	70	194	15	1.169
Sean Manaea	6	8	4.78	33	19	0	150.2	152	88	80	25	44	144	16	1.301
Freddy Peralta	5	9	4.99	22	22	0	113.2	120	71	63	17	48	113	5	1.478
Christian Scott	4	5	3.85	23	23	0	110	93	48	47	12	47	134	9	1.273
Zach Thornton	5	6	3.42	15	15	0	84.1	78	33	32	14	18	63	3	1.138
Devin Williams	3	2	4.43	44	0	16	40.2	43	25	20	3	21	52	0	1.574
Huascar Brazobán	5	2	2.56	46	6	0	52.2	30	16	15	3	23	49	1	1.006
Austin Warren	2	3	4.11	41	2	0	50.1	45	24	23	6	24	55	3	1.371
Luke Weaver	2	1	1.84	42	0	1	44.0	25	10	9	3	11	45	2	0.818
Brooks Raley	5	5	1.96	45	0	0	41.1	30	12	9	2	15	40	3	1.089
David Peterson	3	6	6.09	16	8	1	68.0	82	51	46	6	30	63	3	1.647
Kodai Senga	0	9	7.34	31	8	8	61.1	60	51	50	14	41	75	4	1.647
Tobias Myers	1	2	5.53	32	3	2	53.2	56	36	33	9	16	41	0	1.342
Clay Holmes	4	4	2.39	9	9	0	52.2	40	14	14	3	18	45	1	1.101
Jonah Tong	2	2	3.82	7	4	0	30.2	24	16	13	2	14	34	2	1.239
Jonathan Pintaro	2	3	5.28	22	0	0	30.2	26	19	18	5	16	30	3	1.370
Robert Stock	1	3	5.93	8	7	0	30.1	38	21	20	2	15	29	4	1.747
Daniel Duarte	2	0	2.12	24	0	2	29.2	17	8	7	3	7	30	1	0.809
Cionel Pérez	2	0	3.99	24	2	0	29.1	31	13	13	5	8	35	0	1.330
A. J. Minter	1	1	2.35	23	0	0	23.0	21	8	6	4	2	20	1	1.000
Nate Lavender	1	0	1.66	21	0	0	21.2	12	4	4	1	4	26	0	0.738
Xzavion Curry	0	1	5.48	9	1	0	21.1	22	13	13	7	9	15	1	1.453
Jefry Yan	2	1	4.87	18	1	0	20.1	20	12	11	3	15	26	1	1.721
Dedniel Núñez	2	1	3.32	18	0	1	19.0	17	9	7	4	0	20	0	0.895
Craig Kimbrel	0	2	6.00	14	0	0	15.0	16	12	10	3	6	15	0	1.467
Jack Weisenburger	0	0	2.13	7	0	0	12.2	10	3	3	0	4	14	0	1.105
Joey Gerber	0	0	4.32	7	0	0	8.1	6	4	4	1	4	8	0	1.200
Justin Hagenman	0	0	3.38	3	1	0	8.0	8	3	3	2	2	4	0	1.250
Richard Lovelady	1	1	3.68	6	0	0	7.1	8	5	3	1	4	6	0	1.636
Luis García	0	0	7.11	6	0	0	6.1	11	6	5	0	2	4	0	2.053
Carl Edwards Jr.	0	0	1.50	2	0	0	6.0	3	1	1	1	4	11	0	1.167
Chayce McDermott	1	0	5.06	3	0	0	5.1	5	3	3	1	4	5	0	1.688
Chris Devenski	0	0	13.50	6	0	0	5.1	9	8	8	2	1	2	1	1.875
Luis Torrens	0	0	7.71	2	0	0	2.1	4	2	2	2	0	0	0	1.714
Matt Seelinger	0	1	31.50	1	0	0	2.0	5	7	7	1	4	2	0	4.500
Kevin Herget	0	0	0.00	1	0	0	1.0	0	0	0	0	0	0	0	0.000
Zack Short	0	0	0.00	1	0	0	1.0	0	0	0	0	0	0	0	0.000
Dylan Ross	0	0	0.00	1	0	0	1.0	0	0	0	0	0	0	0	0.000
Guillo Zuñiga	0	0	0.00	1	0	0	1.0	0	0	0	0	1	1	0	1.000
Team totals	74	88	4.15	162	162	31	1441.2	1307	731	665	184	552	1450	79	1.289
Rank in 15 NL teams	13	13	8	—	—	14	6	9	9	8	8	8	5	11	8

Source: Baseball Reference

== Farm system ==
Level	Team	League	Manager
AAA	Syracuse Mets	International League	Dick Scott
AA	Binghamton Rumble Ponies	Eastern League	Michael Collins
High-A	Brooklyn Cyclones	South Atlantic League	Eduardo Nunez
Low-A	St. Lucie Mets	Florida State League	Luis Rivera
Rookie	FCL Mets	Florida Complex League	Lino Diaz
Rookie	DSL Mets 1	Dominican Summer League	JC Rodriguez
Rookie	DSL Mets 2	Dominican Summer League	Felix Fermin Jr.
