= Dedniel Núñez =

Dominican baseball player (born 1996)

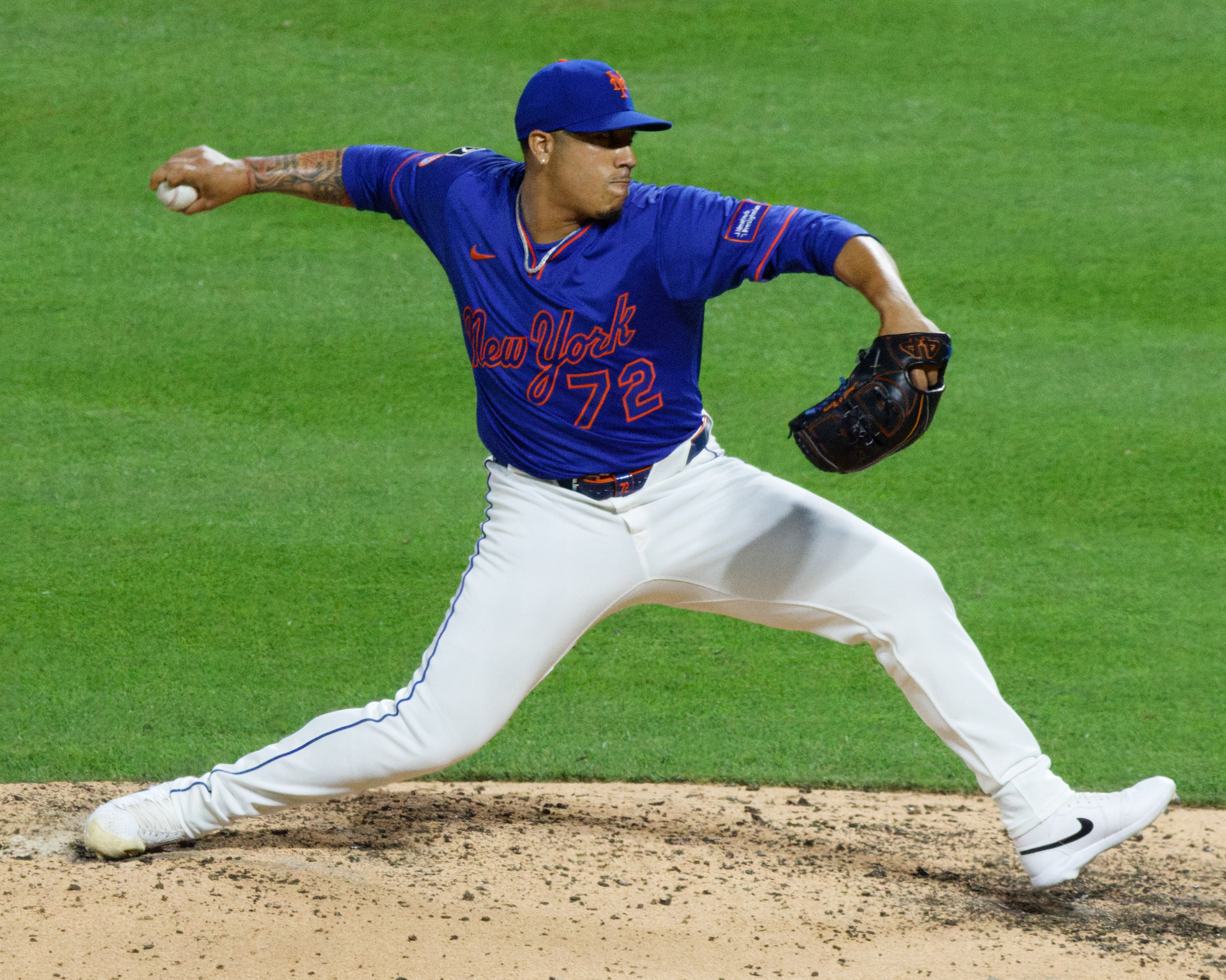
- Núñez with the Mets in 2025

New York Mets – No. 72
- Pitcher
- Born: June 5, 1996 (age 30); Puerto Plata, Dominican Republic
- Bats: Right Throws: Right

MLB debut
- April 9, 2024, for the New York Mets

MLB statistics (through 2026 season)
- Win–loss record: 4–1
- Earned run average: 2.97
- Strikeouts: 79
- Stats at Baseball Reference

Teams
- New York Mets (2024–present)

Dedniel Omar Núñez (born June 5, 1996) is a Dominican professional baseball pitcher for the New York Mets of Major League Baseball (MLB). He made his MLB debut in 2024.

== Career ==
Núñez signed with the New York Mets as an international free agent on October 21, 2016. He made his professional debut in 2017 with the rookie-level Gulf Coast League Mets, posting a 5.24 ERA across 19 games (8 starts). In 2018, Núñez made 11 appearances (7 starts) for the rookie-level Kingsport Mets, registering a 3.79 ERA with 36 strikeouts across 40 1/3 innings pitched.

In 2019, Núñez split the year between the Single-A Columbia Fireflies and High-A St. Lucie Mets, accumulating a 5–4 win–loss record with a 4.39 earned run average and 94 strikeouts in 80 innings pitched. Núñez did not play in a game in 2020 due to the cancellation of the minor league season because of the COVID-19 pandemic.

On December 10, 2020, the San Francisco Giants selected Núñez from the Mets in the Rule 5 draft. On March 15, 2021, it was announced that Núñez had sprained the ulnar collateral ligament in his pitching elbow. On March 18, Núñez was placed on the 60-day injured list after undergoing Tommy John surgery, causing him to miss the entirety of the season. On November 20, the Giants returned Núñez to the Mets.

Núñez returned to action in 2022 with the Double–A Binghamton Rumble Ponies, also playing in three games for St. Lucie. In 23 appearances out of the bullpen for Binghamton, he compiled a 3.49 ERA with 43 strikeouts across 28 1/3 innings pitched. Núñez split the 2023 campaign between Binghamton and the Triple–A Syracuse Mets. In 40 relief outings between the two affiliates, he compiled a 5.53 ERA with 70 strikeouts and 3 saves across 57 innings of work.

On April 9, 2024, Núñez was selected to the 40-man roster and promoted to the major leagues for the first time. Núñez debuted against the Atlanta Braves that same day, pitching two innings in relief of Adrian Houser, and yielding one run. On July 26, the Mets placed Núñez on the 15-day injured list due to a right pronator strain in his right forearm. He was activated from the injured list on August 23 after Huascar Brazobán was optioned to Triple–A Syracuse. In 25 appearances for the Mets, he compiled a 2.31 ERA with 48 strikeouts across 35 innings pitched. On September 13, it was announced that Núñez would miss the remainder of the season with a flexor injury; he subsequently received a platelet-rich plasma injection in an attempt to avoid surgery.

Núñez was optioned to Triple-A Syracuse to begin the 2025 season. In 10 appearances for New York, he recorded a 4.66 ERA with 11 strikeouts across 9 2/3 innings pitched. On July 3, 2025, Núñez was placed on the injured list due to a right elbow sprain. It was announced that Núñez would undergo season-ending Tommy John surgery on July 12, and he was transferred to the 60-day injured list on July 21.

On August 4, 2026, Núñez was activated from the injured list for his season debut and return from surgery.

== See also ==
- Rule 5 draft results
