= Christian Scott (baseball) =

American baseball player (born 1999)

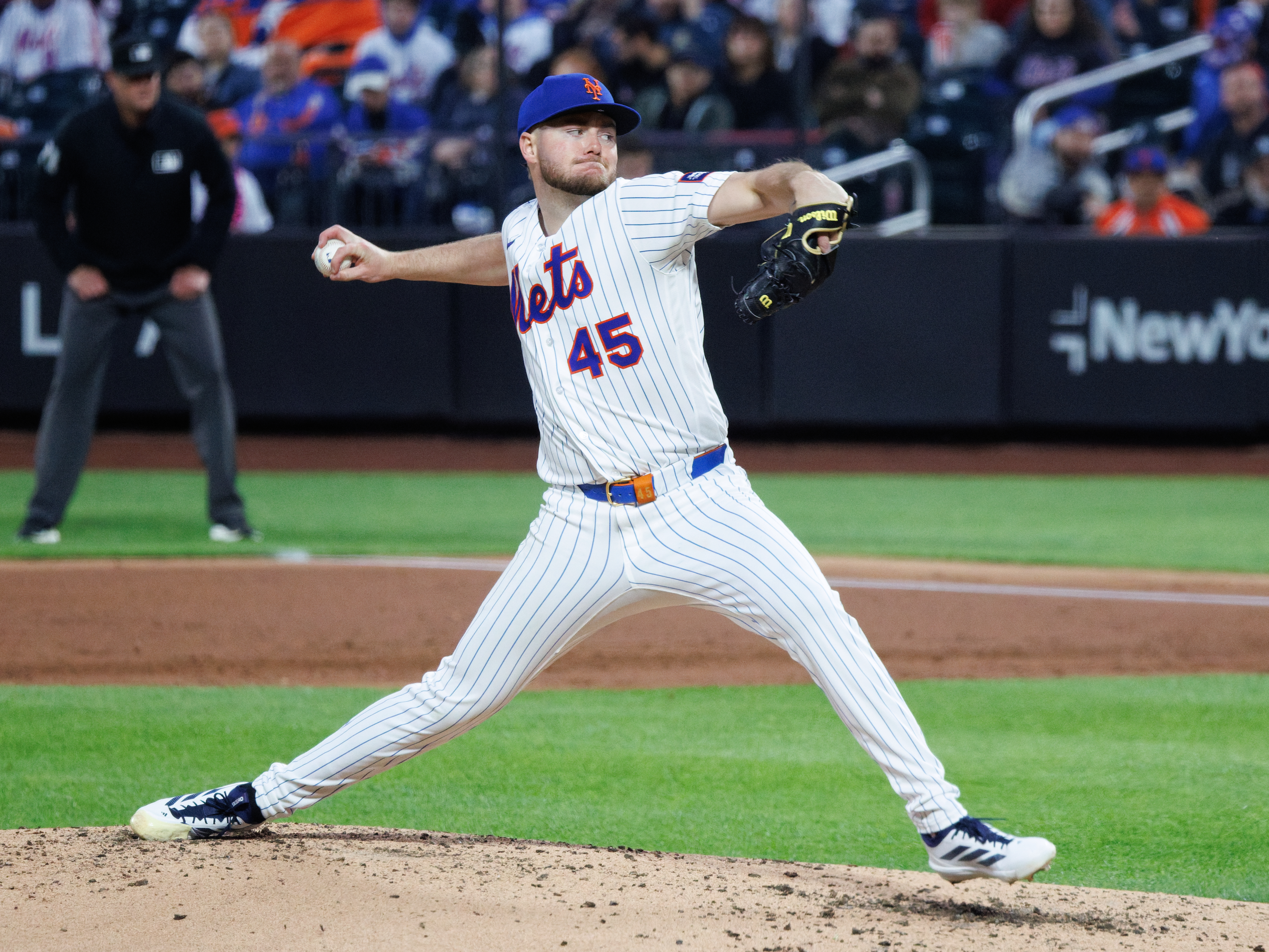
- Scott with the Mets in 2026

New York Mets – No. 45
- Pitcher
- Born: June 15, 1999 (age 27); Coconut Creek, Florida, U.S.
- Bats: Right Throws: Right

MLB debut
- May 4, 2024, for the New York Mets

MLB statistics (through 2026 season)
- Win–loss record: 4–8
- Earned run average: 4.06
- Strikeouts: 173
- Stats at Baseball Reference

Teams
- New York Mets (2024, 2026–present)

Christian David Scott (born June 15, 1999) is an American professional baseball pitcher for the New York Mets of Major League Baseball (MLB). He made his MLB debut in 2024.

== Amateur career ==
Scott attended Calvary Christian Academy in Fort Lauderdale, Florida, and the University of Florida, where he played college baseball for the Florida Gators.

== Professional career ==
The New York Mets selected Scott in the fifth round with the 142nd pick of the 2021 Major League Baseball draft. Scott made his professional debut in 2021 with the Florida Complex League Mets. He pitched 2022 with the St. Lucie Mets and Brooklyn Cyclones for whom he was 3-3 with a 4.45 ERA. After the regular season, he played in the Arizona Fall League for the Peoria Javelinas with whom he was 0-2 with a 10.38 ERA.

He started 2023 with St. Lucie and was promoted to Brooklyn and the Binghamton Rumble Ponies during the season. He began the 2024 season with the Triple-A Syracuse Mets.

On May 4, 2024, Scott was selected to the 40-man roster and promoted to the major leagues for the first time. In his debut on the mound at Tropicana Field against the Tampa Bay Rays, he allowed one earned run on five hits and one walk over 6 2/3 innings. He struck out six Rays batters but did not get a decision in the Mets' 3–1 loss. He was optioned back to Syracuse on May 31. In his first stint in the majors, he made five starts with a 3.90 ERA. He returned to the major league roster on July 3 to rejoin the rotation for a start against the Washington Nationals.

On July 23, 2024, the right-hander was placed on the 15-day injured list with a sprain of the ulnar collateral ligament in his pitching elbow. He mentioned his elbow was aching following his start against the Miami Marlins two days prior. Scott was 0–3 with a 4.56 ERA in nine major league starts after making his debut May 4. On September 18, it was announced that Scott would undergo a combined Tommy John surgery and internal brace procedure, ruling him out for the entirety of the 2025 campaign.

Scott was optioned to Triple-A Syracuse to begin the 2026 season. Scott went a near-record 15 games started without a win, finally earning a win on May 30, 2026 against the Miami Marlins. Scott was placed on the injured list on June 12, due to a hip impingement. He was reinstated on June 27.
