= Dylan Ross =

Dylan Ross may refer to:

- Dylan Ross (rapper) (born 1991), an American rapper
- Dylan Ross (baseball) (born 2000), an American baseball player
