= Nate Lavender =

American baseball player (born 2000)

Nathan Lavender

New York Mets – No. 94
- Pitcher
- Born: January 20, 2000 (age 26); Hudson, Illinois, U.S.
- Bats: Left Throws: Left

MLB debut
- August 4, 2026, for the New York Mets

MLB statistics (through 2026 season)
- Win–loss record: 1–0
- Earned run average: 1.66
- Strikeouts: 26
- Stats at Baseball Reference

Teams
- New York Mets (2026–present)

Nathan James Lavender (born January 20, 2000) is an American professional baseball pitcher for the New York Mets of Major League Baseball (MLB). He made his MLB debut in 2026.

== Career ==
Lavender attended El Paso–Gridley High School in El Paso, Illinois, and played college baseball at University of Illinois Urbana-Champaign. In 2019, he played collegiate summer baseball with the Hyannis Harbor Hawks of the Cape Cod Baseball League. He was drafted by the New York Mets in the 14th round of the 2021 Major League Baseball draft.

Lavender made his professional debut with the Florida Complex League Mets. In 2022, he played for the St. Lucie Mets and Brooklyn Cyclones. He started 2023 with the Binghamton Rumble Ponies before being promoted to the Syracuse Mets.

On May 17, 2024, Lavender underwent a variation of Tommy John surgery in which an internal brace was added to his elbow ligament. He subsequently missed the remainder of the season as a result of the procedure.

On December 11, 2024, Lavender was selected by the Tampa Bay Rays eighth overall in the Rule 5 draft. He missed the entirety of the 2025 season in recovery from surgery. Lavender was designated for assignment by the Rays on November 6, 2025.

On November 12, 2025, Lavender was returned to the Mets organization. He made 25 appearances for Triple–A Syracuse, compiling a 2–2 record and 3.27 ERA with 53 strikeouts and two saves. On August 4, 2026, Lavender was selected to the 40–man roster and promoted to the major leagues for the first time. He made his major league debut that night.

== See also ==
- Rule 5 draft results
