= Jonah Tong =

Canadian baseball player (born 2003)

New York Mets – No. 21
- Pitcher
- Born: June 19, 2003 (age 23); Markham, Ontario, Canada
- Bats: Right Throws: Right

MLB debut
- August 29, 2025, for the New York Mets

MLB statistics (through 2026 season)
- Win–loss record: 4–5
- Earned run average: 5.29
- Strikeouts: 56
- Stats at Baseball Reference

Teams
- New York Mets (2025–present)

Jonah Reid Tin Chee Matthew Tong (born June 19, 2003) is a Canadian professional baseball pitcher for the New York Mets of Major League Baseball (MLB). He made his MLB debut in 2025.

== Career ==
Tong attended Bill Crothers Secondary School in Markham, Ontario. He committed to play college baseball at North Dakota State. As a teenager, Tong played amateur baseball with the Toronto Mets of the Canadian Premier Baseball League. In 2022, he signed with the Langley Blaze of the British Columbia Premier Baseball League before training at Georgia Premier Academy and playing for the Frederick Keys in the MLB Draft League.

Tong was selected by the New York Mets in the seventh round (209th overall) of the 2022 Major League Baseball draft, and signed. In 2023, Tong spent his first professional season with the rookie-level Florida Complex League Mets and Single-A St. Lucie Mets. He started 2024 with St. Lucie before being promoted to the High-A Brooklyn Cyclones.

Tong started the 2025 season with the Double-A Binghamton Rumble Ponies and quickly established himself as one of the top pitching prospects in baseball. On May 10, 2025, he combined with TJ Shook to throw a perfect game, pitching the first 6 2/3 innings before being removed by manager Reid Brignac. On August 26, it was announced that Tong would be promoted to the major leagues for the first time, starting against the Miami Marlins on August 29. He subsequently earned the win in his debut after allowing one earned run with six strikeouts across five innings. However, Tong struggled in the rest of the 2025 season, finishing with a 2-3 record and 7.71 ERA.

Tong was optioned to the Triple-A Syracuse Mets to begin the 2026 season. Despite posting a 5.68 ERA in Triple-A, he was recalled to pitch against the Miami Marlins on May 22. Despite pitching to a 3.60 ERA across 3 starts, he was optioned back to Triple-A on June 3. They brought him back to the big leagues on September 7, where he remained for the season's final weeks.

== Personal life ==
Tong is half Chinese, from his father's side. His mother's family is of Irish, German, and Scottish descent. Tong has two siblings.
