= Nick Morabito =

American baseball player (born 2003)

New York Mets – No. 55
- Outfielder
- Born: May 7, 2003 (age 23); McLean, Virginia, U.S.
- Bats: Right Throws: Right

MLB debut
- May 19, 2026, for the New York Mets

MLB statistics (through 2026 season)
- Batting average: .195
- Home runs: 0
- Runs batted in: 4
- Stats at Baseball Reference

Teams
- New York Mets (2026–present)

Nicholas Anthony Morabito (born May 7, 2003) is an American professional baseball outfielder for the New York Mets of Major League Baseball (MLB). He debuted in MLB in 2026.

== Amateur career ==
Morabito attended Gonzaga College High School in Washington, D.C.. As a senior in 2022, he was the Gatorade Baseball Player of the Year for Washington, D.C. Morabito was selected by the New York Mets in the second round of the 2022 Major League Baseball draft. He signed with the Mets rather than play college baseball at Virginia Tech.

== Professional career ==
Morabito made his professional debut with the Florida Complex League Mets. He played 2023 with the Florida Complex League Mets and St. Lucie Mets and started 2024 with St. Lucie.

On November 18, 2025, the Mets added Morabito to their 40-man roster to protect him from the Rule 5 draft. Morabito was optioned to the Triple-A Syracuse Mets to begin the 2026 season.

On May 19, 2026, Morabito was promoted to the major leagues for the first time. He made his MLB debut later that day against the Washington Nationals, going 0-for-3 with a hit by pitch. In that game, Morabito wore number 8, which had not been assigned by the Mets since Gary Carter was enshrined in the Baseball Hall of Fame in 2003. He was subsequently switched to number 55. Morabito was optioned to Syracuse on May 26.

An early September call-up was all Morabito needed to collect his first career hit in the Majors. In his 13th at-bat, Morabito ripped a three-run double down the left field line that cleared the bases during the seventh inning of the Mets 10-4 win over the Tampa Bay Rays at Tropicana Field in St. Petersburg, Florida on September 2, 2026. Morabito went 2-for-2 with a single, double and 3 RBI, and also had a spectacular diving catch while playing left field to end the eighth inning.
