= Zac Thornton =

American baseball player (born 2002)

New York Mets – No. 49
- Pitcher
- Born: January 17, 2002 (age 24); Winona, Minnesota, U.S.
- Bats: Left Throws: Left

MLB debut
- May 20, 2026, for the New York Mets

MLB statistics (through 2026 season)
- Win–loss record: 5–6
- Earned run average: 3.42
- Strikeouts: 63
- Stats at Baseball Reference

Teams
- New York Mets (2026–present)

Zachary Charles Thornton (born January 17, 2002) is an American professional baseball pitcher for the New York Mets of Major League Baseball (MLB).

== Amateur career ==
Thornton attended Lawrence Free State High School in Lawrence, Kansas. He played two seasons of college baseball at Barton Community College before transferring to Grand Canyon University for the 2023 season. In his lone season at Grand Canyon, he started 15 games and went 9–2 with a 3.87 ERA. After the season, he played in the MLB Draft League with the West Virginia Black Bears.

== Professional career ==
Thornton was selected by the New York Mets in the fifth round of the 2023 Major League Baseball draft. He signed with the team for $350,000.

Thornton made his professional debut in 2024 with the Single-A St. Lucie Mets and was promoted to the High-A Brooklyn Cyclones in August. Over twenty games (12 starts) between the two teams, he went 5–4 with a 4.10 ERA and 54 strikeouts over 68 innings. He returned to Brooklyn to open the 2025 season and was named South Atlantic League Pitcher of the Month in April. He was promoted to the Double-A Binghamton Rumble Ponies in late April and earned Eastern League Pitcher of the Week honors in May. Thornton made 14 starts between the two teams, going 6–2 with a 1.98 ERA and 78 strikeouts over 72 2/3 innings before an oblique injury ended his season in June. Thornton returned to Binghamton to open the 2026 season and was promoted to the Triple-A Syracuse Mets in early May. Across seven starts between both teams prior to his MLB promotion, Thornton pitched to a 1–3 record, a 3.16 ERA, and 40 strikeouts across 37 innings.

On May 18, 2026, Mets manager Carlos Mendoza announced that Thornton would be promoted to the major leagues to take the roster spot of Clay Holmes, who had been placed on the injured list. On May 20, his contract was formally selected to the 40-man and active rosters. He made his MLB debut that night as the Mets' starting pitcher at Nationals Park against the Washington Nationals. Thornton pitched 4 1/3 innings in which he gave up four earned runs (including a three-run home run to CJ Abrams), four hits, and two walks alongside recording three strikeouts in an 8-4 Mets loss. He was optioned to Syracuse on May 23, recalled by the Mets on June 26, and then optioned back to Syrcause the next day. Thornton was recalled by the Mets once again on July 12, and spent the remainder of the season in their starting rotation. On July 21, he recorded his first MLB win after pitching six scoreless innings against the Milwaukee Brewers in a 4-0 victory. Thornton made a total of 15 starts for the Mets and had a 5–6 record, a 3.42 ERA, and 63 strikeouts over 84 1/3 innings.
