= Andy Ibáñez =

Cuban baseball player (born 1993)

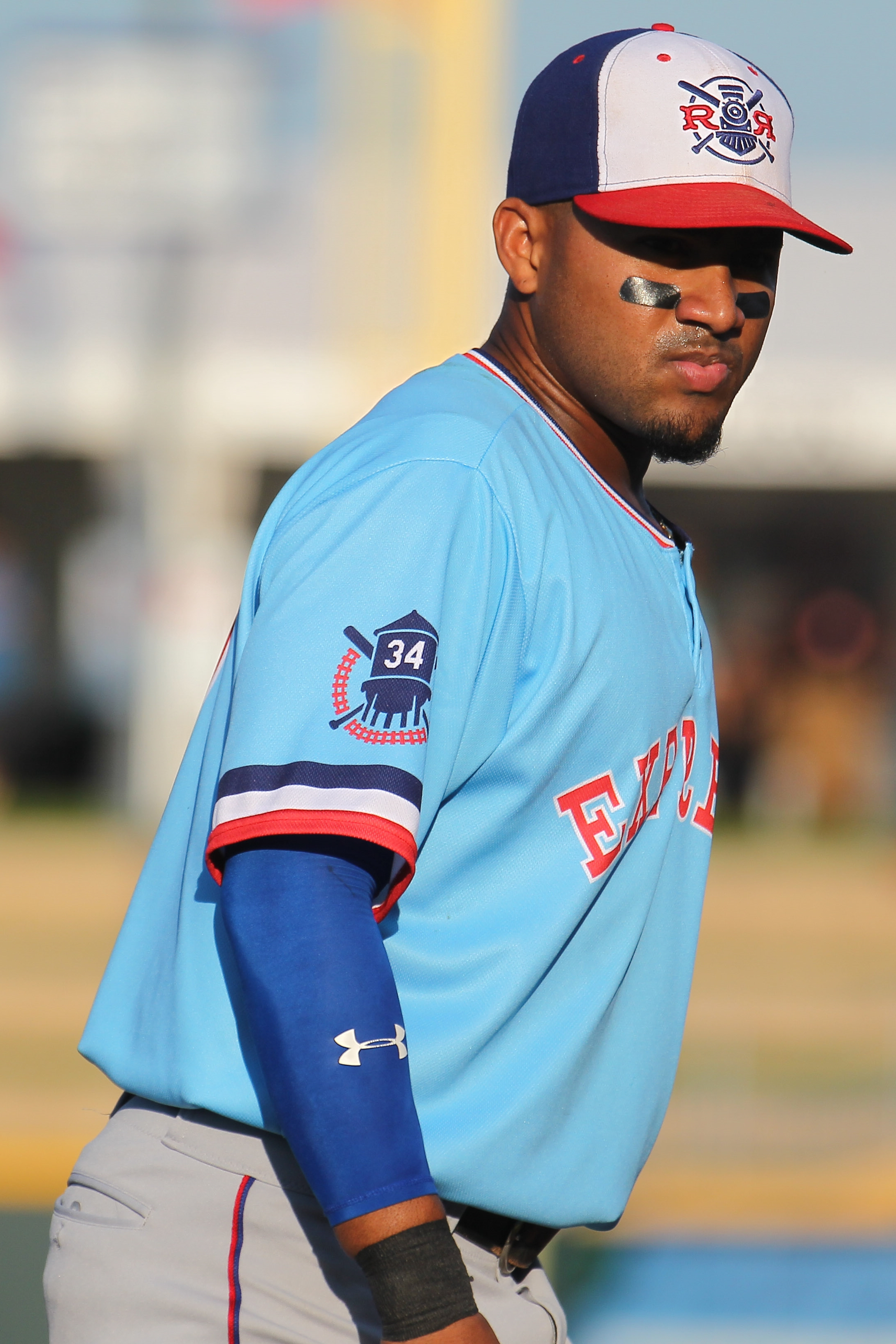
- Ibáñez with the Round Rock Express in 2018

Free agent
- Utility player
- Born: April 3, 1993 (age 33); Havana, Cuba
- Bats: Right Throws: Right

MLB debut
- May 4, 2021, for the Texas Rangers

MLB statistics (through 2026 season)
- Batting average: .250
- Home runs: 28
- Runs batted in: 133
- Stats at Baseball Reference

Teams
- Texas Rangers (2021–2022); Detroit Tigers (2023–2025); Athletics (2026); New York Mets (2026)
Medals
Men's baseball
Representing Cuba
World Port Tournament
Gold medal – first place	2013 Rotterdam	Team

Andy Ibáñez Velázquez (born April 3, 1993) is a Cuban professional baseball utility player who is a free agent. He has previously played in Major League Baseball (MLB) for the Texas Rangers, Detroit Tigers, Athletics, and New York Mets.

== Career ==
Ibáñez played for the Cuba national baseball team at the 2013 World Baseball Classic. He played for Isla de la Juventud in the Cuban National Series. He defected from Cuba on November 1, 2014, to pursue a career in Major League Baseball. He signed a minor league deal with the Texas Rangers on July 7, 2015.

=== Texas Rangers ===
Ibáñez made his professional debut in 2016, spending time with both the Hickory Crawdads and Frisco RoughRiders, batting a combined .285 with 13 home runs, 66 RBI, 15 stolen bases and an .804 OPS in 130 total games between the two clubs. In 2017, he returned to Frisco and spent the whole season there, slashing .265/.323/400 with eight home runs and 29 RBI in 82 games. He missed six weeks of the season due to a finger injury.Ibáñez spent the 2018 season with the Round Rock Express of the Triple-A Pacific Coast League. He posted a batting line of .283/.344/.410 with 12 home runs and 55 RBI in 125 games. Ibáñez played for the Aguilas Cibaenas of the Dominican Winter League in the 2018 offseason.

Ibáñez received a non-roster invitation to 2019 major league spring training. In 2019, Ibáñez suffered a strained right oblique during spring training, and returned on April 6, when he was assigned to the Triple-A Nashville Sounds. He spent the 2019 season with Nashville, hitting .300/.371/.497/.868 with 20 home runs and 65 RBI. Ibáñez did not play in a game in 2020 due to the cancellation of the minor league season because of the COVID-19 pandemic.

On May 4, 2021, the Rangers selected Ibáñez's contract to the 40-man roster and promoted him to the major leagues for the first time. Ibáñez made his debut that day as a pinch hitter for David Dahl, and collected his first MLB hit off of Minnesota Twins reliever Taylor Rogers. On June 21, Ibáñez recorded his first career home run, a 3-run shot off of Oakland Athletics starter Frankie Montas. Over 76 games for Texas in 2021, Ibáñez hit .277/.321/.435 with seven home runs and 25 RBI. Ibáñez split the 2022 season between Texas and Round Rock. Over 40 games for Texas he hit .219/.273/.277 with one home run and nine RBI; with Round Rock he hit .255/.330/.390 with six home runs and 31 RBI.

=== Detroit Tigers ===
The Detroit Tigers claimed Ibáñez off of waivers after the 2022 season. On January 6, 2023, Ibáñez was removed from the 40-man roster and sent outright to the Triple-A Toledo Mud Hens. In 20 games with Toledo, Ibáñez hit .297/.418/.609 with five home runs and 16 RBI. Ibáñez had his contract selected to the active roster on April 29.On August 22, 2023, Ibáñez had the first multi-homer game of his career, hitting two home runs off Chicago Cubs starter Drew Smyly. For the 2023 season, Ibáñez batted .264 with 11 home runs and 41 RBI in 114 games.

For the 2024 season, Ibáñez played 99 games, batting .241 with 5 home runs. On October 2, 2024, in the 8th inning of Game 2 of a 3-game Wild Card series against the Houston Astros, Ibáñez hit a pinch hit 3-run double deep to the corner in left field off of closer Josh Hader, giving the Tigers a 5–2 lead. The hit proved to be the series winner, as the Tigers went on to sweep the Astros in two games.

The Tigers and Ibáñez agreed to a one-year, $1.4 million contract for the 2025 season, avoiding arbitration. He split time between Triple-A Toledo and the Tigers in 2025, hitting .239 with four home runs and 21 RBI in 91 games at the major league level. On November 21, 2025, Ibáñez was non-tendered by Detroit and became a free agent.

=== Athletics ===
Ibáñez signed a one-year $1.2 million contract with the Los Angeles Dodgers on January 13, 2026. On February 3, he was designated for assignment by the Dodgers. On February 6, Ibáñez was claimed off waivers by the Athletics. He made 11 appearances for the team, going 2-for-17 (.118) with three RBI. Ibáñez was designated for assignment by the Athletics on April 26.

=== New York Mets ===
The New York Mets claimed Ibáñez off of waivers on April 30, 2026. He appeared in three games for New York, but was hitless in six at-bats. On May 12, Ibáñez was designated for assignment following the promotion of A. J. Ewing. He cleared waivers and was sent outright to the Triple-A Syracuse Mets on May 15. In 31 appearances for Syracuse, Ibáñez batted .269/.295/.429 with four home runs and 18 RBI. He was released by the Mets organization on August 14.

=== Seattle Mariners ===
On August 17, 2026, Ibáñez signed a minor league contract with the Seattle Mariners. In 28 games with Triple-A Tacoma Rainiers he batted .266/.308/.367 with 2 home runs, 15 RBIs and 3 stolen bases. He elected free agency on November 2.

== See also ==
- List of baseball players who defected from Cuba
