= A. J. Ewing =

American baseball player (born 2004)

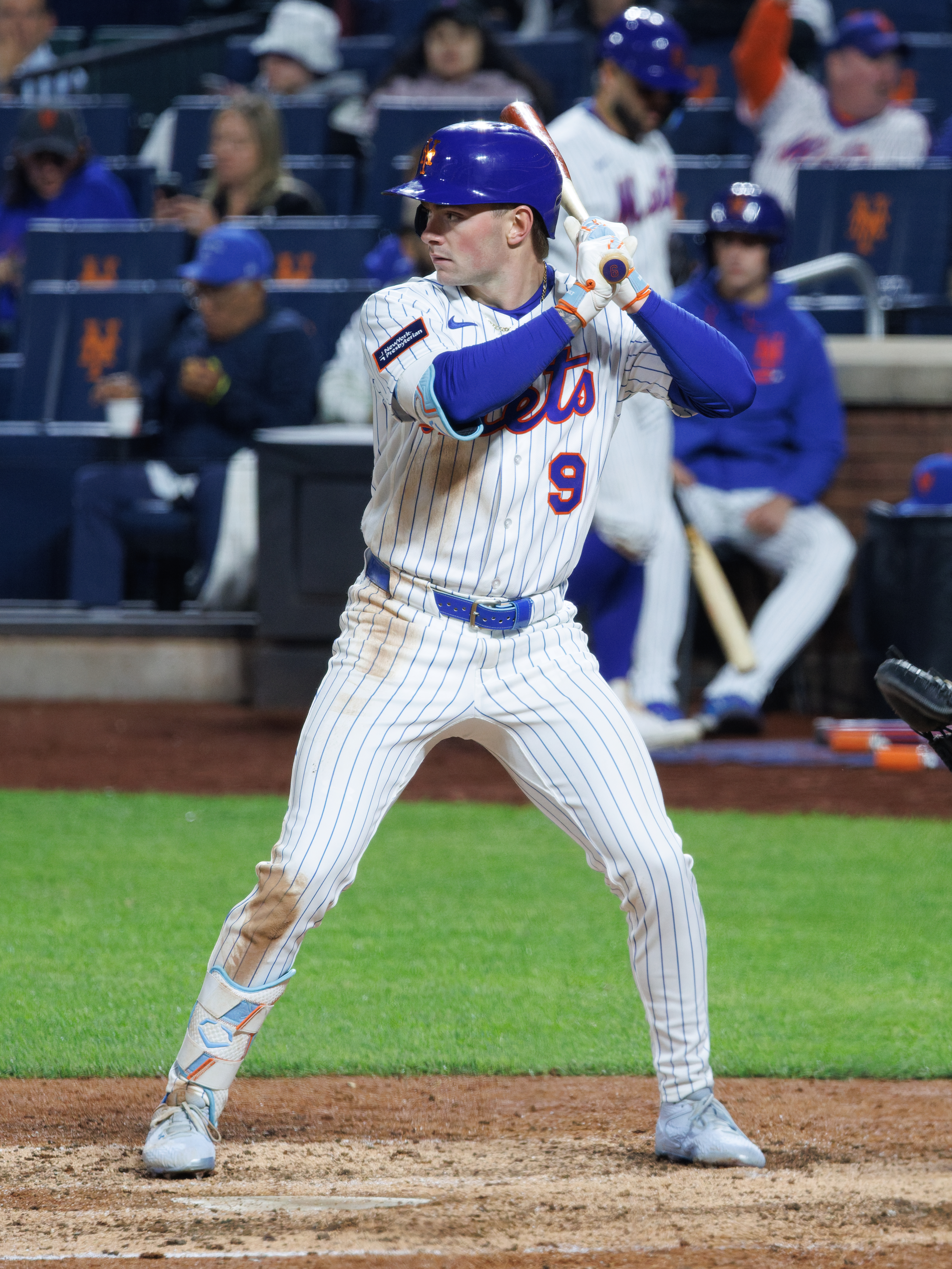
- Ewing with the Mets in 2026

New York Mets – No. 9
- Outfielder
- Born: August 10, 2004 (age 22); Kettering, Ohio, U.S.
- Bats: Left Throws: Right

MLB debut
- May 12, 2026, for the New York Mets

MLB statistics (through 2026 season)
- Batting average: .252
- Home runs: 11
- Runs batted in: 43
- Stats at Baseball Reference

Teams
- New York Mets (2026–present)

Andrew Joseph Ewing (born August 10, 2004) is an American professional baseball outfielder for the New York Mets of Major League Baseball (MLB). He made his MLB debut in 2026.

== Amateur career ==
Ewing attended Springboro High School in Springboro, Ohio. As a senior in 2023, he hit .464 with 37 RBI. He originally committed to play college baseball at Wright State University, but later flipped to the University of Alabama.

== Professional career ==
Ewing was selected by the New York Mets in the fourth round (134th overall) of the 2023 Major League Baseball draft. He signed with the Mets for $675,000, forgoing playing college baseball for Alabama. He made his professional debut with the rookie-level Florida Complex League Mets, playing in seven games.

Ewing played the 2024 season with the FCL Mets and St. Lucie Mets, hitting .233 with 10 home runs and 49 RBI over 90 games. Ewing opened the 2025 season with St. Lucie before being promoted to the Brooklyn Cyclones in May. In August, he was promoted to the Binghamton Rumble Ponies. Over 124 games between the three teams, Ewing hit .315 with three home runs, 55 RBI, and 70 stolen bases.

On May 12, 2026, Ewing was promoted to the major leagues for the first time. He made his MLB debut later that day, going 1-for-2 with a two-run RBI triple while recording three walks, two runs scored, and a stolen base. On May 14, during a 9–4 victory over the Detroit Tigers, Ewing hit his first major league home run against pitcher Keider Montero. On September 22, during a 6–3 victory over the Texas Rangers, Ewing stole his 25th base of the season, surpassing Mookie Wilson for the most stolen bases by a Met in their rookie season.

Ewing played in 120 games for the Mets in 2026, batting .252/.324/.376 with 11 home runs, 25 stolen bases, 55 runs scored, and 43 RBI.
