= Jefry Yan =

Dominican baseball player (born 1996)

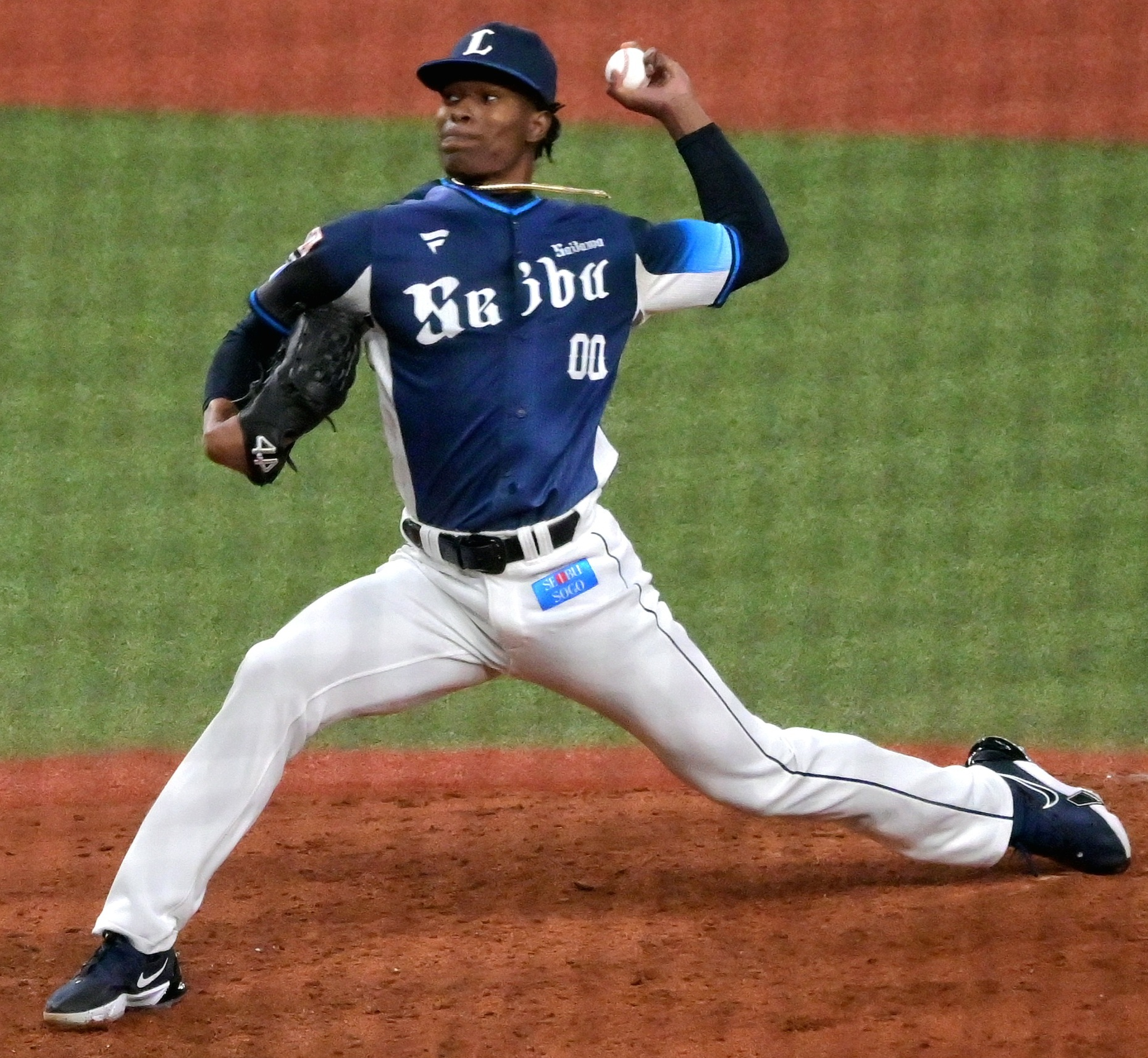
- Yan with the Saitama Seibu Lions in 2024

New York Mets – No. 84
- Pitcher
- Born: August 17, 1996 (age 30); San Rafael del Yuma, Dominican Republic
- Bats: Left Throws: Left

Professional debut
- NPB: April 14, 2024, for the Saitama Seibu Lions
- MLB: August 5, 2026, for the New York Mets

NPB statistics (through 2024 season)
- Win–loss record: 0–0
- Earned run average: 5.58
- Strikeouts: 35

MLB statistics (through 2026 season)
- Win–loss record: 2–1
- Earned run average: 4.87
- Strikeouts: 26
- Stats at Baseball Reference

Teams
- Saitama Seibu Lions (2024); New York Mets (2026–present)

Jefry Yan (born August 17, 1996) is a Dominican professional baseball pitcher for the New York Mets of Major League Baseball (MLB). He has previously played in Nippon Professional Baseball (NPB) for the Saitama Seibu Lions.

Yan became known for his elaborate strikeout celebrations, named "La Sentencia 99", which he developed during his minor league career. His celebrations typically involve jumping high into the air and landing in a near-split position before slapping the ground and returning to the mound. The celebrations attracted viral attention during spring training in 2025 and again following his major league debut in 2026.

== Career ==
=== Los Angeles Angels ===
On April 27, 2013, Yan signed with the Los Angeles Angels as an international free agent. He made his professional debut in 2014 with the Dominican Summer League Angels, for whom he spent the 2015 season with as well. In 41 relief appearances across the two seasons, Yan accumulated a 6–3 record and 4.22 ERA with 43 strikeouts across 59 2/3 innings of work. In 2016, Yan underwent Tommy John surgery and missed the ensuing season in recovery.

=== Miami Marlins ===
On April 29, 2021, after having spent the prior four seasons out of affiliated baseball, during which he worked full time as a roofer, Yan signed a minor league contract with the Miami Marlins. He had been discovered by the team while pitching in a men's league in Arizona. Yan split the season between the Single-A Jupiter Hammerheads and Double-A Pensacola Blue Wahoos, appearing in 21 games out of the bullpen, and posted a 2.61 ERA to go with 51 strikeouts across 31 innings of work.

Yan returned to Pensacola in 2022. In 38 appearances, he pitched to a 2–4 record and 4.89 ERA with 88 strikeouts across 57 innings pitched.

Yan split the 2023 season between Pensacola and the Triple-A Jacksonville Jumbo Shrimp. In 49 relief appearances between the two affiliates, he had a 3–5 record and 4.89 ERA with 102 strikeouts and 13 saves across 57 innings of work. He was named a Southern League All-Star for his work as Pensacola's closer during the year. Yan elected free agency following the season on November 6, 2023.

=== Saitama Seibu Lions ===
On December 5, 2023, Yan signed a one-year, $500,000 contract with the Saitama Seibu Lions of Nippon Professional Baseball. In 37 appearances for the Lions in 2024, he compiled a 5.58 ERA with 35 strikeouts across 30 2/3 innings pitched. On October 14, the Lions announced they would not be renewing Yan's contract for 2025, making him a free agent.

=== Colorado Rockies ===
On December 15, 2024, Yan signed a minor league contract with the Colorado Rockies. In 27 appearances for the Triple-A Albuquerque Isotopes, he struggled to a 1–3 record and 7.28 ERA with 45 strikeouts across 29 2/3 innings pitched. Yan was released by the Rockies on July 20, 2025.

=== New York Mets ===
On August 1, 2025, Yan signed a minor league contract with the New York Mets. On July 2, 2026, the Mets added Yan to their 40-man roster and optioned him to the Triple-A Syracuse Mets. In 14 appearances for Syracuse, he posted a 2–1 record and 2.40 ERA with 32 strikeouts and one save over 15 innings of work. On August 4, at age 29, 13 years after signing his first professional contract, Yan was promoted to the major leagues for the first time. On August 5, he made his major league debut against the Cleveland Guardians where he struck out two batters without allowing any runs. On August 15, he recorded his first MLB win in a 5-4 decision over the Washington Nationals at Citi Field.

== Personal life ==
Yan met Maria Torres, a realtor and healthcare administrator with an MBA, in 2017. The couple married in 2019.
