= Austin Warren (baseball) =

American baseball player (born 1996)

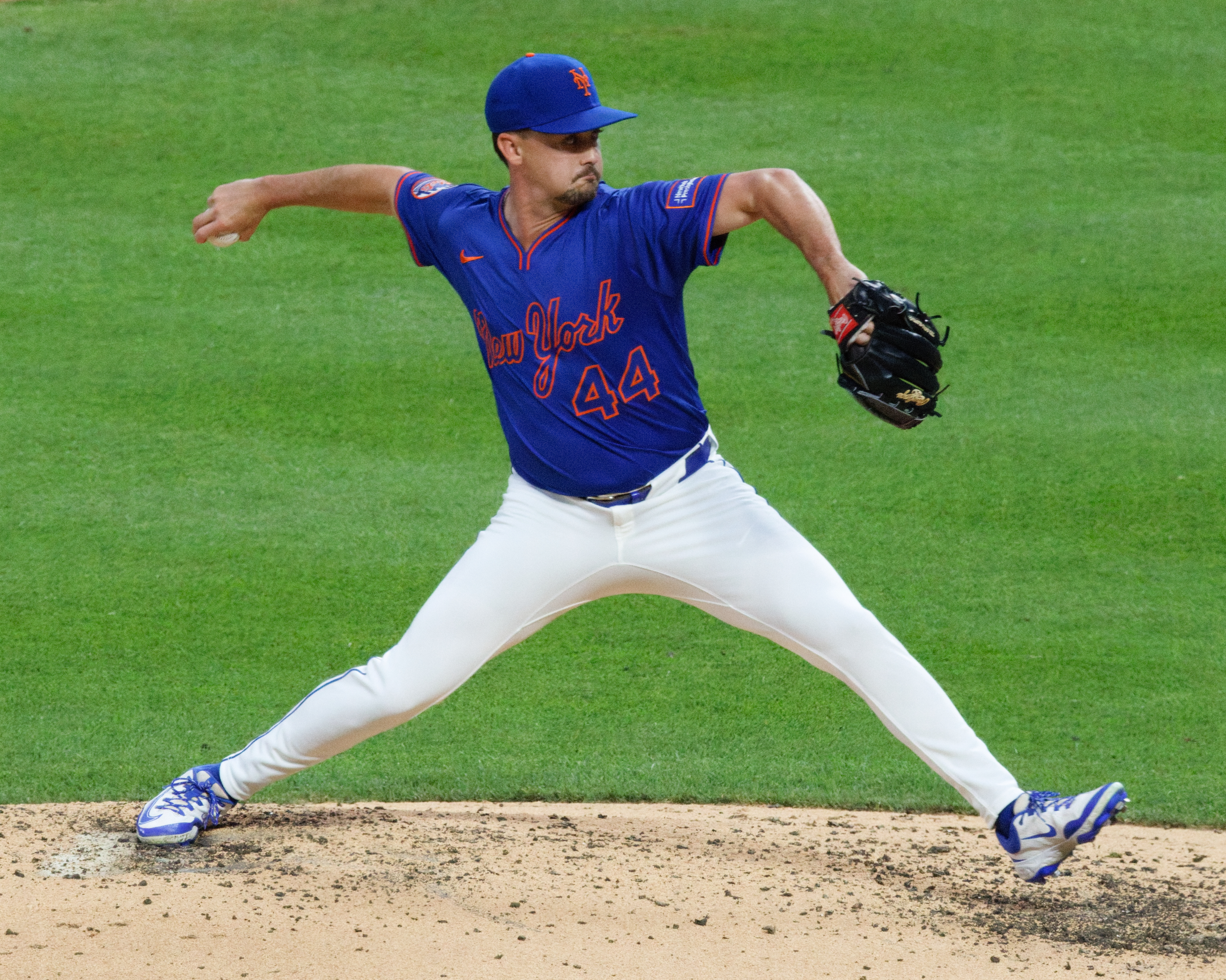
- Warren with the Mets in 2025

New York Mets – No. 44
- Pitcher
- Born: February 5, 1996 (age 30); Fayetteville, North Carolina, U.S.
- Bats: Right Throws: Right

MLB debut
- July 29, 2021, for the Los Angeles Angels

MLB statistics (through 2026 season)
- Win–loss record: 9–3
- Earned run average: 3.41
- Strikeouts: 102
- Stats at Baseball Reference

Teams
- Los Angeles Angels (2021–2023); San Francisco Giants (2024); New York Mets (2025–present)

Austin Davis Warren (born February 5, 1996) is an American professional baseball pitcher for the New York Mets of Major League Baseball (MLB). He has previously played in MLB for the Los Angeles Angels and San Francisco Giants. He made his MLB debut in 2021.

== Amateur career ==
Warren attended Terry Sanford High School in Fayetteville, North Carolina. In addition to being a starter, Warren also posted a .387 batting average with 55 RBIs throughout his high school career. After graduating high school, Warren spent two seasons at Wake Technical Community College as a pitcher and middle infielder. As a sophomore, he posted a .302 batting average with 14 RBIs, while also putting up a 2.69 ERA over 67 innings on the mound. Warren transferred to University of North Carolina Wilmington after his sophomore year. In his junior year, he went 2–5 with a 6.51 ERA and 52 strikeouts in 47 innings pitched. In his senior year, Warren went 8–0 with a 1.11 ERA in a team-high 28 appearances. The Seahawks would go on to win the Colonial Athletic Association tournament title that year.

== Professional career ==
=== Los Angeles Angels ===
In the 2018 Major League Baseball draft, the Los Angeles Angels selected Warren in the sixth round, with the 181st overall pick. He began his 2018 season with the Orem Owlz, later finishing with the Single-A Burlington Bees. Warren was promoted to the Low-A Inland Empire 66ers to begin 2019, later finishing with the Double-A Mobile BayBears. Warren did not pitch in 2020 due to the cancellation of the minor league season caused by the COVID-19 pandemic. He began his 2021 season with the Triple-A Salt Lake Bees. In 36 1/3 innings, Warren posted a 6.19 ERA, striking out 27.1% of opposing hitters with a 10.8% walk rate.

Warren was called up to the majors for the first time on July 28, 2021. He made his debut the following night, pitching 1 1/3 scoreless innings in relief against the Oakland Athletics. On August 6, Warren picked up his first major league win against the Los Angeles Dodgers, pitching 2 1/3 scoreless innings. He finished his rookie campaign with a 1.77 ERA with 20 strikeouts across 16 relief appearances for the Angels. Warren made 14 appearances for Los Angeles in 2022, working to a 2–0 record and 5.63 ERA with nine strikeouts in 16 innings pitched.

On January 9, 2023, Warren was designated for assignment by the Angels following the signing of Brett Phillips. He cleared waivers and was sent outright to Triple-A Salt Lake on January 13. Warren began the 2023 season with Salt Lake, making 5 scoreless appearances with 8 strikeouts and 3 walks in 7.0 innings pitched. On April 21, his contract was selected to the active roster. He made two appearances before being shut down due to injury. On May 5, 2023, it was revealed that Warren would require Tommy John surgery, ending his season.

On February 7, 2024, Warren was designated for assignment by the Angels following the acquisition of Guillermo Zuñiga. He was released by the Angels the following day.

=== San Francisco Giants ===
On February 14, 2024, Warren signed a one-year, major league contract with the San Francisco Giants. He was activated from the injured list and optioned to the Triple–A Sacramento River Cats on July 13. Warren made 6 appearances for San Francisco, posting a 1.69 ERA with 7 strikeouts across 10 2/3 innings pitched. On January 8, 2025, Warren was designated for assignment by the Giants.

=== New York Mets ===
On January 15, 2025, Warren was claimed off waivers by the New York Mets. He was optioned to the Triple-A Syracuse Mets to begin the regular season.

Warren was again optioned to Triple-A Syracuse to begin the 2026 season.
