= Dylan Ross (baseball) =

American baseball player (born 2000)

Free agent
- Pitcher
- Born: September 1, 2000 (age 26); Statesboro, Georgia, U.S.
- Bats: Right Throws: Right

MLB debut
- September 1, 2026, for the New York Mets

MLB statistics (through 2026 season)
- Win–loss record: 0–0
- Earned run average: 0.00
- Strikeouts: 0
- Stats at Baseball Reference

Teams
- New York Mets (2026)

Dylan Winton Ross (born September 1, 2000) is an American professional baseball pitcher who is a free agent. He has previously played in Major League Baseball (MLB) for the New York Mets. He made his MLB debut in 2026.

== Amateur career ==
Ross attended Georgia Premier Academy in Statesboro, Georgia, and played college baseball at Eastern Kentucky University, Northwest Florida State College and the University of Georgia. He underwent Tommy John surgery during his junior year at Georgia in 2022.

== Professional career ==
Despite missing the 2022 college baseball season due to his injury, Ross was selected by the New York Mets in the 13th round (389th overall) of the 2022 Major League Baseball draft.

After undergoing a second operation on his UCL, Ross missed the 2023 season. He made his professional debut in 2024, pitching in one game with the St. Lucie Mets. After the season, he played in the Arizona Fall League. Between 2021 and 2024, he pitched only 11.2 innings. Ross started 2025 with the High-A Brooklyn Cyclones, and was promoted to the Double-A Binghamton Rumble Ponies and Triple-A Syracuse Mets during the season.

On September 27, 2025, Ross was selected to the 40-man roster and promoted to the major leagues for the first time. He did not appear for the Mets during the team's final two games of the season, and subsequently became a phantom ballplayer.

Ross was optioned to Triple-A Syracuse to begin the 2026 season. In 38 appearances for Syracuse, he posted a 3–1 record and 6.94 ERA with 45 strikeouts and five saves. On September 1, 2026, Ross was promoted to the major leagues. On November 17, 2026, the Mets designated him for assignment. On November 20, he was non-tendered by the Mets and became a free agent.
