= Nolan McLean =

American baseball player (born 2001)

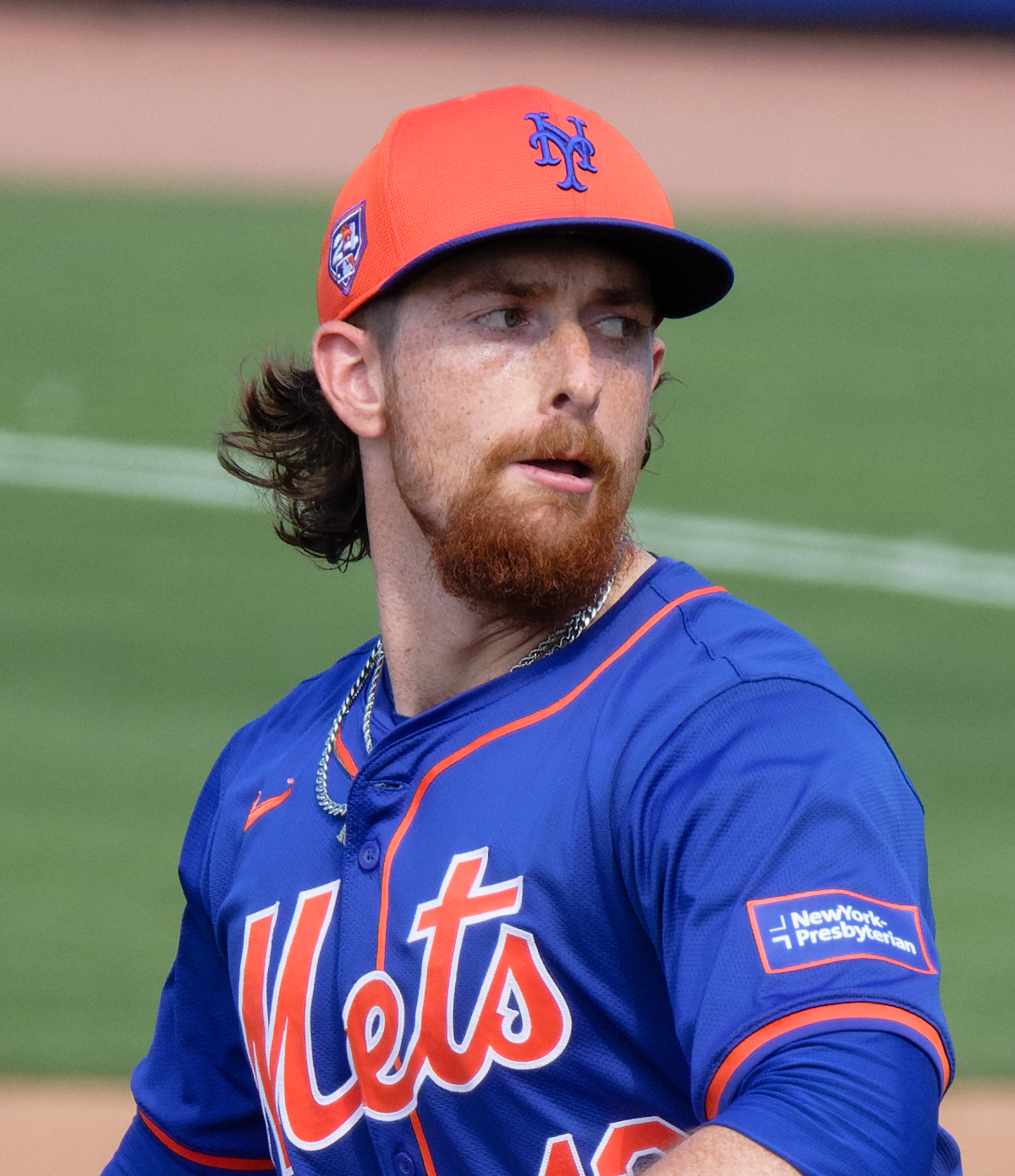
- McLean with the Mets in 2024

New York Mets – No. 26
- Pitcher
- Born: July 24, 2001 (age 25); Willow Spring, North Carolina, U.S.
- Bats: Right Throws: Right

MLB debut
- August 16, 2025, for the New York Mets

MLB statistics (through 2026 season)
- Win–loss record: 17–11
- Earned run average: 2.93
- Strikeouts: 251
- Stats at Baseball Reference

Teams
- New York Mets (2025–present)

Career highlights and awards
- Gold Glove Award (2026)
Medals
Men's baseball
Representing United States
World Baseball Classic
Silver medal – second place	2026 Miami	Team
18U Baseball World Cup
Silver medal – second place	2019 Gijang	Team

Nolan James McLean (born July 24, 2001) is an American professional baseball pitcher for the New York Mets of Major League Baseball (MLB). He made his MLB debut in 2025.

== Amateur career ==
McLean grew up in Willow Spring, North Carolina, and attended Garner Magnet High School. McLean committed to play both baseball and football at Oklahoma State University.

McLean batted .263 with eight home runs and 20 RBI, and had an 0–1 record with a 18.00 ERA in two relief appearances as a pitcher, while playing for the Cowboys during his freshman season. He redshirted his freshman season on the football team before giving up his career as a quarterback to focus solely on baseball. In 2021, he played collegiate summer baseball with the Chatham Anglers of the Cape Cod Baseball League. As a sophomore, McLean batted .285 with 19 home runs, and struck out 39 batters in 25 1/3 innings pitched.

The Baltimore Orioles selected McLean in the third round of the 2022 Major League Baseball draft. The Orioles drafted him as a pitcher. However, the Orioles were concerned about something which showed up in his MRI, which diminished their interest in him and therefore their offer to him; McLean ultimately did not sign with the team, instead returning to Oklahoma State for his junior season. He hit .250 with nine home runs and 29 RBI, and went 1–2 with six saves and a 3.30 ERA in 14 pitching appearances, during his junior season.

== Professional career ==
The New York Mets selected McLean as a two-way player in the third round with the 91st pick of the 2023 Major League Baseball draft. He signed with the Mets, on July 15, 2023, for the full slot value of $747,600. He later transitioned into being a full time pitcher.

=== 2024 ===
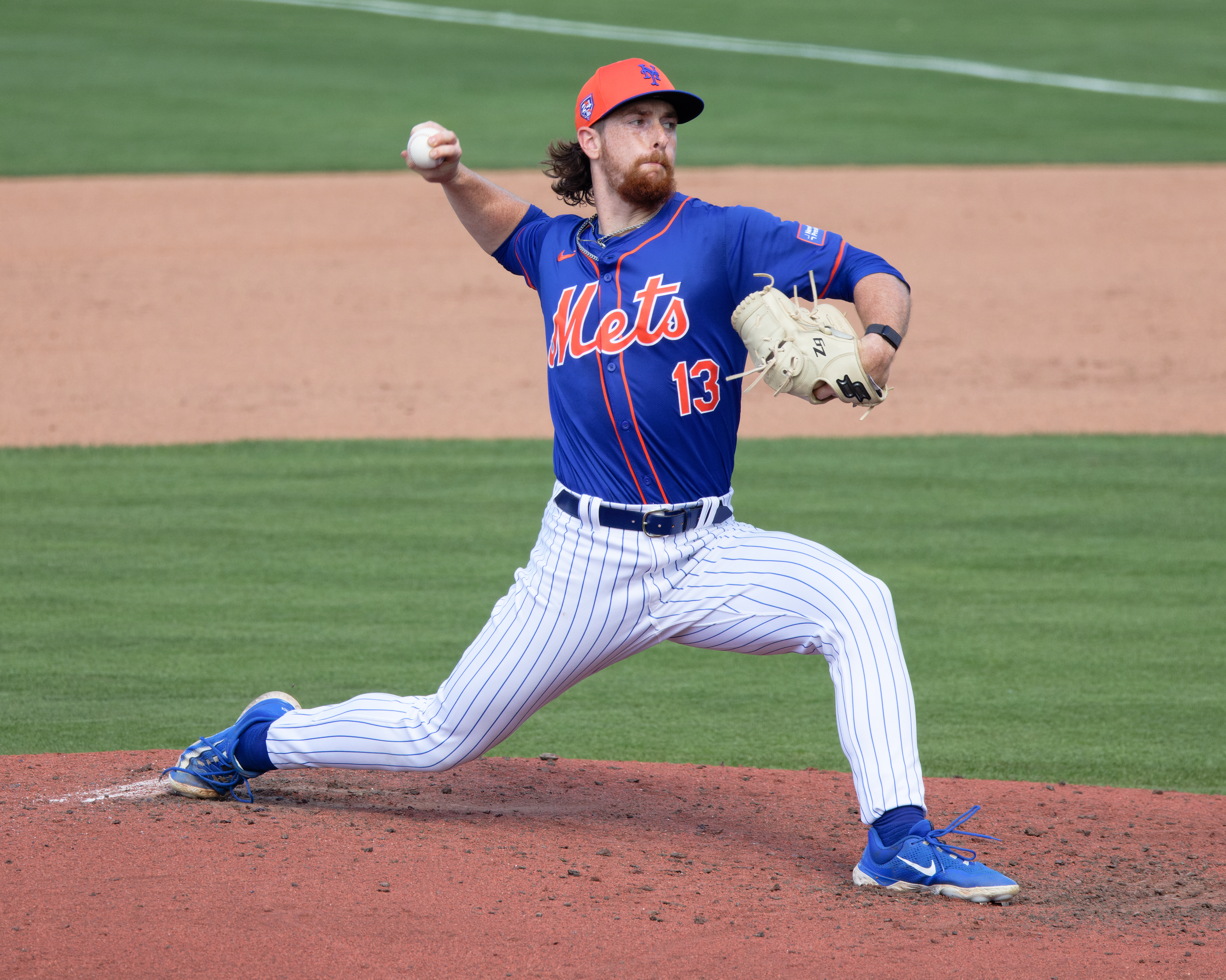
McLean with the Mets in 2024 during spring training

McLean split the 2024 season between the High-A Brooklyn Cyclones and the Double-A Binghamton Rumble Ponies, compiling a 3.78 ERA, 1.26 WHIP, 116 strikeouts, and 42 walks over 109 2/3 innings.

=== 2025 ===
McLean rejoined Binghamton to begin the 2025 season and logged a 1.37 ERA over 26 1/3 innings before earning a promotion to the Triple-A Syracuse Mets. At the Triple-A level, McLean registered a 2.78 ERA and 97 strikeouts over 87 1/3 innings. On August 13, 2025, the Mets promoted McLean to the major leagues for the first time. On August 16, he made his first career start against the Seattle Mariners. He went 5 1/3 innings, giving up no runs, and striking out 8 in a 3–1 victory, earning his first career win. Six days later in Atlanta, McLean earned his second win in as many starts, allowing two runs on four hits over seven innings against the Braves. McLean was even better in his third start, throwing eight shutout innings in a 6–0 victory to close out a sweep at Citi Field of the first place Philadelphia Phillies, and lowering his ERA to 0.89 and his WHIP to 0.69, to go along with his 3–0 record. He continued his impressive run in his fourth start, retiring the final 14 batters that he faced. He is the first Mets pitcher to earn a win in his first four career starts. He finished the season with a 5–1 record, 2.06 ERA, 1.04 WHIP, and 57 strikeouts over 48 innings.

=== 2026 ===
McLean made 31 starts in 2026, pitching to a 12–10 record with a 3.16 ERA and 194 strikeouts across 179 2/3 innings pitched. Compared to the rest of the National League, McLean recorded the 9th-lowest ERA and the 7th-most strikeouts across the 6th-most innings pitched. His fielding was also stellar as he recorded the 2nd-most assists as a pitcher with 24 and the 4th-most defensive runs saved among pitchers, while also recording three successful pickoffs and allowing only six stolen bases on just eight attempts. McLean was voted the National League's Gold Glove Award winner among pitchers, making him the first rookie pitcher to ever win the award, the first Mets rookie to ever win it, and the first Mets pitcher to win it since Ron Darling in 1989. He finished fourth in NL Rookie of the Year voting.

== International career ==
On December 17, 2025, Team USA announced Nolan, as well as Minnesota Twins starter Joe Ryan, and his fellow Mets starter Clay Holmes, would start for them in the 2026 World Baseball Classic. On March 10, 2026, McLean started his first career game for Team USA, vs Team Italy in a group stage game, pitching three innings, allowing three earned runs, two home runs while striking out four, getting handed the loss. McLean started the final of the tournament on March 17th, 2026 against Team Venezuela, pitching four and two-thirds innings, allowing 2 earned runs, one home run, while striking out 4, pitching to a no-decision in a 3-2 loss.

== Personal life ==
McLean is a Christian. He is married to Avery Frechette. McLean grew up a fan of the Atlanta Braves.
