= Daniel Duarte (baseball) =

Mexican baseball player (born 1996)

New York Mets – No. 54
- Pitcher
- Born: December 4, 1996 (age 29); Etchojoa, Sonora, Mexico
- Bats: Right Throws: Right

MLB debut
- April 8, 2022, for the Cincinnati Reds

MLB statistics (through 2026 season)
- Win–loss record: 6–0
- Earned run average: 3.18
- Strikeouts: 58
- Stats at Baseball Reference

Teams
- Cincinnati Reds (2022–2023); Minnesota Twins (2024); New York Mets (2026–present)

Daniel Francisco Duarte (born December 4, 1996) is a Mexican professional baseball pitcher for the New York Mets of Major League Baseball (MLB). He has previously played in MLB for the Cincinnati Reds and Minnesota Twins. He was signed by the Texas Rangers as an international free agent in 2013. Duarte is listed at 6 feet 0 inches (1.83 m) and 235 pounds (107 kg) and bats and throws right handed.

== Career ==
=== Texas Rangers ===
On July 2, 2013, Duarte was signed by the Texas Rangers organization as an international free agent. He made his professional debut with the Arizona League Rangers in 2015, posting a 5.68 ERA in four games. In 2016, Duarte pitched in 12 games for the Dominican Summer League Rangers, recording a 6–3 record and 3.05 ERA with 44 strikeouts in 59 innings pitched. On April 18, 2017, Duarte was loaned to the Tigres de Quintana Roo of the Mexican League for the 2017 season. In 37 appearances for Quintana Roo, Duarte logged a 6–1 record and 1.96 ERA.

=== Kansas City Royals ===
On December 12, 2017, Duarte was selected by the Kansas City Royals in the minor league phase of the Rule 5 draft. Duarte was loaned to the Tigres de Quintana Roo of the Mexican League from March 30 to June 30, 2018, and posted a 2–1 record and 4.26 ERA in 21 appearances. He split the remainder of the season between the rookie-level Idaho Falls Chukars and the Single-A Lexington Legends, recording a cumulative 1.05 ERA in 13 appearances. For the 2019 season, Duarte split the year between the rookie-level Arizona League Royals, Lexington, and the High-A Wilmington Blue Rocks, pitching to a 5.60 ERA with 26 strikeouts in 27 1/3 innings pitched. On October 19, 2019, Duarte was released by the Royals organization.

=== Cincinnati Reds ===
On January 28, 2020, Duarte signed with the Tigres de Quintana Roo of the Mexican League. However, he was released on February 7 so he could pursue an opportunity with an MLB team. On February 8, Duarte signed a minor league contract with the Cincinnati Reds organization. Duarte did not play in a game in 2020 due to the cancellation of the minor league season because of the COVID-19 pandemic. He was released by the Reds organization on June 1.

=== Acereros de Monclova ===
On May 20, 2021, Duarte signed with the Acereros de Monclova of the Mexican League. Duarte recorded an 0.64 ERA in 13 appearances for Monclova before being released on June 23 so he could sign with an MLB organization.

=== Cincinnati Reds (second stint) ===
On June 24, 2021, Duarte signed a minor league deal with the Cincinnati Reds organization. Duarte played in four different levels for the Reds organization in 2021: the rookie-level Arizona Complex League Reds, the High-A Dayton Dragons, the Double-A Chattanooga Lookouts, and the Triple-A Louisville Bats. Between the four teams, Duarte pitched to a 4.56 ERA with 32 strikeouts in 23 2/3 innings of work across 19 total appearances. On November 19, 2021, the Reds added Duarte to their 40-man roster to protect him from the Rule 5 draft.

Duarte made his major league debut on April 8, 2022. He made 3 appearances out of Cincinnati's bullpen before he was placed on the injured list on April 17 with right elbow inflammation. He was later transferred to the 60-day IL on April 23. He was activated on September 25 and subsequently optioned to Triple–A Louisville. On November 18, 2022, Duarte was non-tendered and became a free agent.

On November 22, 2022, Duarte re-signed with the Reds on a minor league contract. He began the 2023 season with Triple–A Louisville, working to a 3.49 ERA with 32 strikeouts and 4 saves in 28 1/3 innings across 26 games. On June 13, 2023, Duarte was selected to the major league roster. In 31 games for Cincinnati, he posted a 3–0 record and 3.69 ERA with 23 strikeouts across 31 2/3 innings pitched. On January 13, 2024, Duarte was designated for assignment after the signing of Brent Suter was made official.

=== Minnesota Twins ===
On January 16, 2024, Duarte was traded to the Texas Rangers in exchange for cash considerations. The Rangers designated him for assignment on January 26; he was claimed off waivers by the Minnesota Twins on February 2. The Twins also designated him for assignment, on February 7. He cleared waivers and was sent outright to the Triple-A St. Paul Saints on February 13. On March 28, Duarte had his contract selected after making the Opening Day roster. He made only two appearances for Minnesota, recording a 2.25 ERA with 3 strikeouts across 4 innings pitched. On May 8, Duarte underwent season–ending elbow surgery. On November 4, Duarte was removed from the 40–man roster and sent outright to St. Paul. He elected free agency the next day.

On November 6, 2024, Duarte re-signed with the Twins on a minor league contract. He did not make an appearance for the organization in 2025 as he continued to recover from surgery. Duarte elected free agency following the season on November 6, 2025.

=== New York Mets ===
On December 8, 2025, Duarte signed a minor league contract with the New York Mets. He made 12 appearances (four starts) for the Triple-A Syracuse Mets to begin the regular season, recording a 2.60 ERA with 14 strikeouts and one save. On May 18, 2026, the Mets selected Duarte's contract, adding him to their active roster.

== International career ==
Duarte was selected to the Mexico national baseball team at the 2020 Summer Olympics (contested in 2021).

== See also ==
- Rule 5 draft results
