= Jack Weisenburger (baseball) =

American baseball player (born 1997)

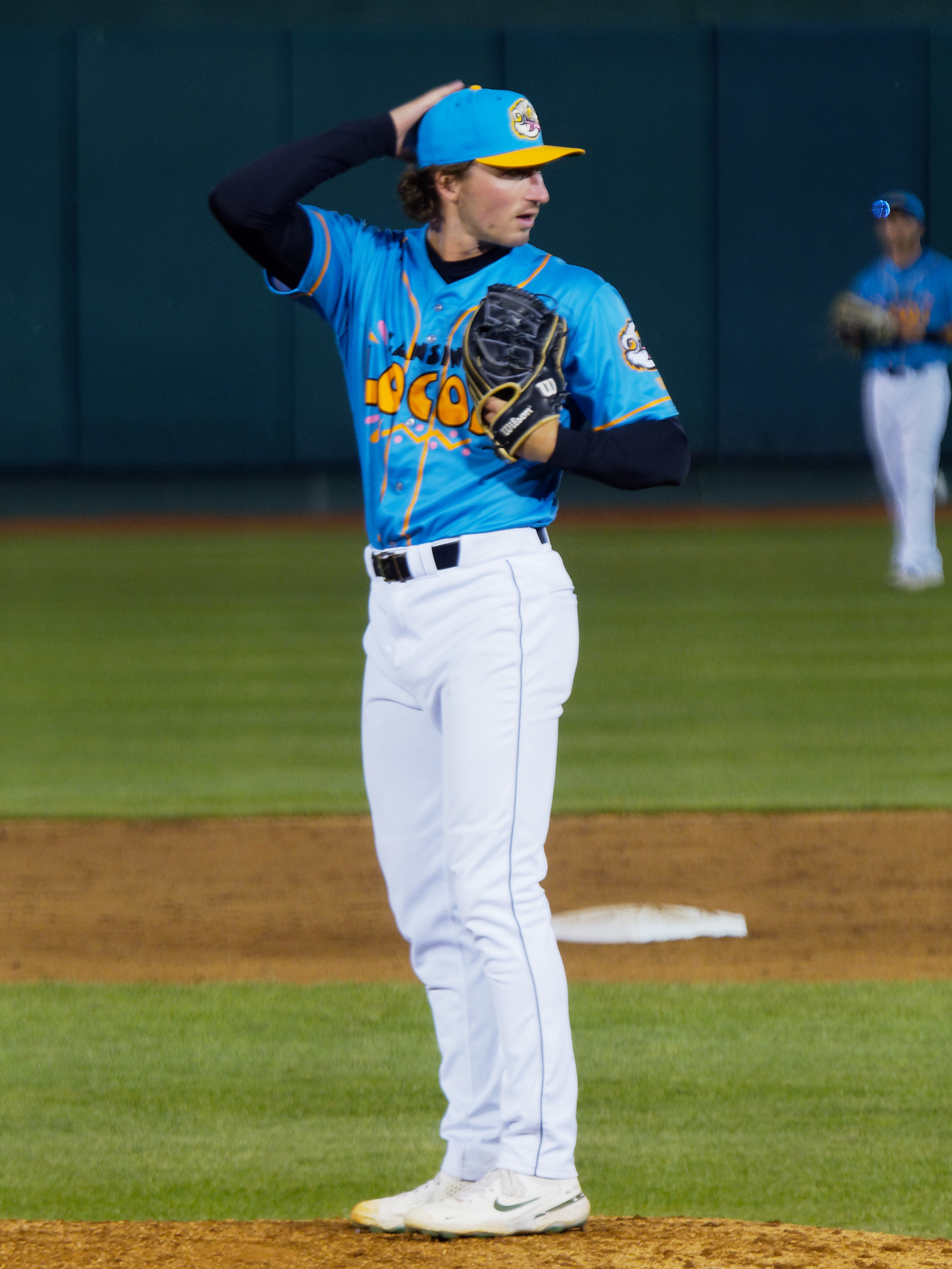
- Weisenburger with the Lansing Lugnuts in 2021

New York Mets – No. 82
- Pitcher
- Born: October 8, 1997 (age 29); Winston-Salem, North Carolina, U.S.
- Bats: Right Throws: Right

MLB debut
- August 9, 2026, for the New York Mets

MLB statistics (through 2026 season)
- Win–loss record: 0–0
- Earned run average: 2.13
- Strikeouts: 14
- Stats at Baseball Reference

Teams
- New York Mets (2026–present)

John Edward Weisenburger (born October 8, 1997) is an American professional baseball pitcher for the New York Mets of Major League Baseball (MLB).

== Career ==
Weisenberger played college baseball at the University of Michigan, where his grandfather, Jack Weisenburger, and father, Perk Weisenburger, both played football and baseball for the Wolverines. He was selected by the Oakland Athletics in the 20th round of the 2019 Major League Baseball draft. He played in the Athletics organization until 2024.

In 2025, Weisenberger played with the Hagerstown Flying Boxcars of the Atlantic League of Professional Baseball. He started 2026 with El Águila de Veracruz of the Mexican Baseball League before signing with the New York Mets.

On August 9, 2026, Weisenburger was selected to the 40–man roster and promoted to the major leagues for the first time. He made his MLB debut that day, pitching the final two innings in relief of Sean Manaea, giving up no runs and striking out two in an 11–1 victory over the Pittsburgh Pirates.
