= Jonathan Pintaro =

American baseball player (born 1997)

New York Mets – No. 91
- Pitcher
- Born: November 7, 1997 (age 29); Pelham, Alabama, U.S.
- Bats: Right Throws: Right

MLB debut
- June 25, 2025, for the New York Mets

MLB statistics (through 2026 season)
- Win–loss record: 2–3
- Earned run average: 5.74
- Strikeouts: 31
- Stats at Baseball Reference

Teams
- New York Mets (2025–present)

Jonathan Ryan Pintaro (born November 7, 1997) is an American professional baseball pitcher for the New York Mets of Major League Baseball (MLB). He made his MLB debut in 2025.

== Career ==
=== Amateur ===
Pintaro attended Montevallo High School in Montevallo, Alabama, and played college baseball at Shorter University.

=== Glacier Range Riders ===
Pintaro was not selected in the 2022 MLB draft, and signed with the Glacier Range Riders of the Pioneer League on May 16, 2023. In 21 appearances (14 starts) for the team, he compiled a 5–6 record and 6.95 ERA with 86 strikeouts across 90 2/3 innings pitched. Pintaro made three starts for the Riders in 2024, registering a 1–0 record and 4.40 ERA with 23 strikeouts across 14 1/3 innings pitched.

=== New York Mets ===
On June 3, 2024, Pintaro signed a minor league contract with the New York Mets organization. He split the remainder of the season between the High-A Brooklyn Cyclones, Double-A Binghamton Rumble Ponies, and Triple-A Syracuse Mets, accumulating a combined 3–6 record and 2.68 ERA with 75 strikeouts over 17 appearances.

Pintaro was assigned to Double-A Binghamton to begin the 2025, logging an 0–2 record and 3.40 ERA with 57 strikeouts over his first 11 starts. On June 25, 2025, he was promoted to the major leagues for the first time. In the Mets' 7-3 win over the Atlanta Braves, Pintaro began the ninth inning and got two outs, but also allowed two runs and two hits before being pulled for Edwin Díaz, who got the save.

Pintaro was optioned to Triple-A Syracuse to begin the 2026 season.
