= Ulnar collateral ligament =

Ulnar collateral ligament (or UCL) may refer to:

- Ulnar carpal collateral ligament
- Ulnar collateral ligament of elbow joint
- Ulnar collateral ligament of thumb
