= Florida Complex League Mets =

- (1983, 1988–1999, 2004–2011, 2013–present); Port St. Lucie, Florida

Minor league affiliations
- Class: Rookie
- League: Florida Complex League
- Division: East Division (1992−1999, 2004–2011, 2013–present)
- Previous leagues: Gulf Coast League (1988−1999, 2004−2011, 2013–2020)

Major league affiliations
- Team: New York Mets

Minor league titles
- League titles (2): 1997; 1999
- Division titles (8): 1993; 1997; 1999; 2004; 2005; 2021; 2022; 2023

Team data
- Name: FCL Mets
- Previous names: GCL Mets (1988−1999, 2004−2011, 2013–2020)
- Ballpark: Clover Park (1992−1999, 2004−2011, 2013–present)
- Previous parks: Twin Lakes Park (1988−1991)
- Owner/ Operator: New York Mets
- Manager: Lino Diaz

The Florida Complex League Mets are a Rookie-level affiliate for the New York Mets, competing in the Florida Complex League of Minor League Baseball. Prior to 2021, the team was known as the Gulf Coast League Mets. The team plays its home games at Clover Park in Port St. Lucie, Florida. The team is composed mainly of players who are in their first year of professional baseball either as draftees or non-drafted free agents from the United States, Canada, Dominican Republic, Venezuela, and other countries.

== History ==
The team entered the Gulf Coast League (GCL) in 1983, was absent for four seasons, then returned to the league for the 1988–1999 seasons. After again being absent for four seasons, the team returned to the league for the 2004–2011 seasons. On December 20, 2011, it was announced the Mets would eliminate their Rookie level team due to financial reasons.

The team originally played their home games in Sarasota, Florida, at Twin Lakes Park. In 1992, the team moved their base of operations to Port St. Lucie, Florida, when the league expanded to Florida's east coast.

On November 8, 2012, the Mets announced the re-establishment of a Gulf Coast League team based in Port St. Lucie. The team has competed continuously since the 2013 season, except for the 2020 season, which was cancelled due to the COVID-19 pandemic. Prior to the 2021 season, the Gulf Coast League was renamed as the Florida Complex League (FCL).

== Season-by-season record ==
Year	Record	Finish	Manager	Playoffs
1983	24–35	8th	Vern Hoscheit	
1988	21–42	10th (t)	John Tamargo	
1989	25–38	12th	John Tamargo	
1990	29–30	10th	John Tamargo	
1991	24–35	14th	Junior Roman	
1992	29–30	10th	Junior Roman	
1993	39–20	2nd	Junior Roman	Lost in 1st round vs. GCL Astros (1 game to 0)
1994	32–27	6th	Junior Roman	
1995	38–19	2nd	John Stephenson	
1996	29–30	10th	Mickey Brantley	
1997	42–18	1st	Mickey Brantley (18–7) / Doug Flynn (24–11)	League Champs vs. GCL Rangers (2 games to 0); Won in 1st round vs. GCL Yankees (1 game to 0)
1998	24–35	13th	John Stephenson	
1999	39–21	1st	John Stephenson	League Champs vs. GCL Twins (2 games to 0); Won in 1st round vs. GCL Royals (1 game to 0)
2004	36–24	2nd (t)	Brett Butler	Lost in 1st round vs. GCL Red Sox (1 game to 0)
2005	37–16	1st	Gary Carter	Lost League Finals vs. GCL Yankees (2 games to 0)
2006	23–30	9th	Bobby Floyd	
2007	20–35	14th	Juan López	
2008	27–27	9th (t)	Bobby Floyd	
2009	22–34	14th	Julio Franco	
2010	31–25	4th	Sandy Alomar, Sr.	Lost in 1st round vs. GCL Phillies (1 game to 0)
2011	27–29	8th	Luis Rojas	
2013	20–40	16th	Jose Carreno	
2014	33–27	7th	Jose Carreno	
2015	27–32	9th (t)	Jose Carreno	
2016	26-29	10th	Jose Carreno	
2017	19-37	16th	Jose Carreno	
2018	24-31	14th	David Davalillo	
2019	30-24	6th	David Davalillo	Playoffs cancelled due to Hurricane Dorian
2020	No Season due to pandemic			
2021	32-22	6th	Robbie Robinson	
2022	33-22	4th	Endy Chávez	Lost in 1st round vs. FCL Rays (1 game to 0)
2023	32-18	1st	Jay Pecci	Lost in 1st round vs. FCL Braves (1 game to 0)
2024	23-28	11th	Danny Ortega	
2025	25-28	9th	Lino Díaz	

== Roster ==
Florida Complex League Mets roster
Players	Coaches/Other
Pitchers: 28 Eris Albino; -- Austin Brown; 22 Frank Camarillo; 23 Parker Carlson; 52 Joe Charles; 54 Ryan Dollar; -- Nathan Hall; 20 Camden Lohman; 76 Miguel Mejias; -- Emilio Obispo; -- Cesar Rivera; -- Christian Scott *; -- Jun-Seok Shim; 10 Dillon Stiltner; 40 Cam Tilly; 33 John Valle; -- Conner Ware; Catchers: 86 Yovanny Rodriguez; 58 Francisco Toledo; 39 Julio Zayas; Infielders: 2 Branny De Oleo; 1 Anthony Frobose; 57 Vladi Gomez; Outfielders: 3 Bohan Adderley; -- JT Benson; 26 Edward Lantigua; -- Trey Rutledge; 7 Wyatt Vincent	Manager: 3 Lino Diaz; Coaches: 40 Garrett Baker (pitching); 45 Wander Cabrera (pitching); 39 Alejandro Diaz (hitting); -- Buddy Fultz (bench); -- Ruben Sosa (roving hitting); 60-day injured list: -- Peter Kussow; -- Peyton Prescott; -- Daniel Silva; 7-day injured list; * On New York Mets 40-man roster; ~ Development list; # Rehab assignment; ∞ Reserve list; ‡ Restricted list; § Suspended list; † Temporarily inactive list; Roster updated March 28, 2026; Transactions; → More rosters: MiLB • Florida Complex League; → New York Mets minor league players
