= St. Lucie Mets =

- Founded in 1988; Port St. Lucie, Florida
Team logo
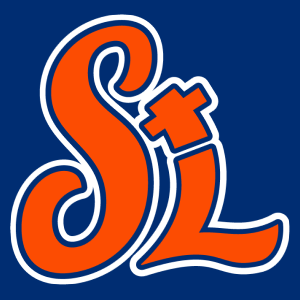
Cap insignia

Minor league affiliations
- Class: Single-A (2021–present)
- Previous classes: Class A-Advanced (1990–2020); Class A (1988–1989)
- League: Florida State League (1988–present)
- Division: East Division

Major league affiliations
- Team: New York Mets (1988–present)

Minor league titles
- League titles (6): 1988; 1996; 1998; 2003; 2006; 2022
- Division titles (8): 1988; 1996; 1998; 2003; 2006; 2011; 2021; 2022
- First-half titles (2): 2022; 2025
- Second-half titles (1): 2025

Team data
- Name: St. Lucie Mets (1988–present)
- Colors: Blue, Orange, White
- Mascot: Klutch
- Ballpark: Clover Park (1988–present)
- Owner/ Operator: New York Mets
- General manager: Traer Van Allen
- Manager: Luis Rivera
- Website: milb.com/st-lucie

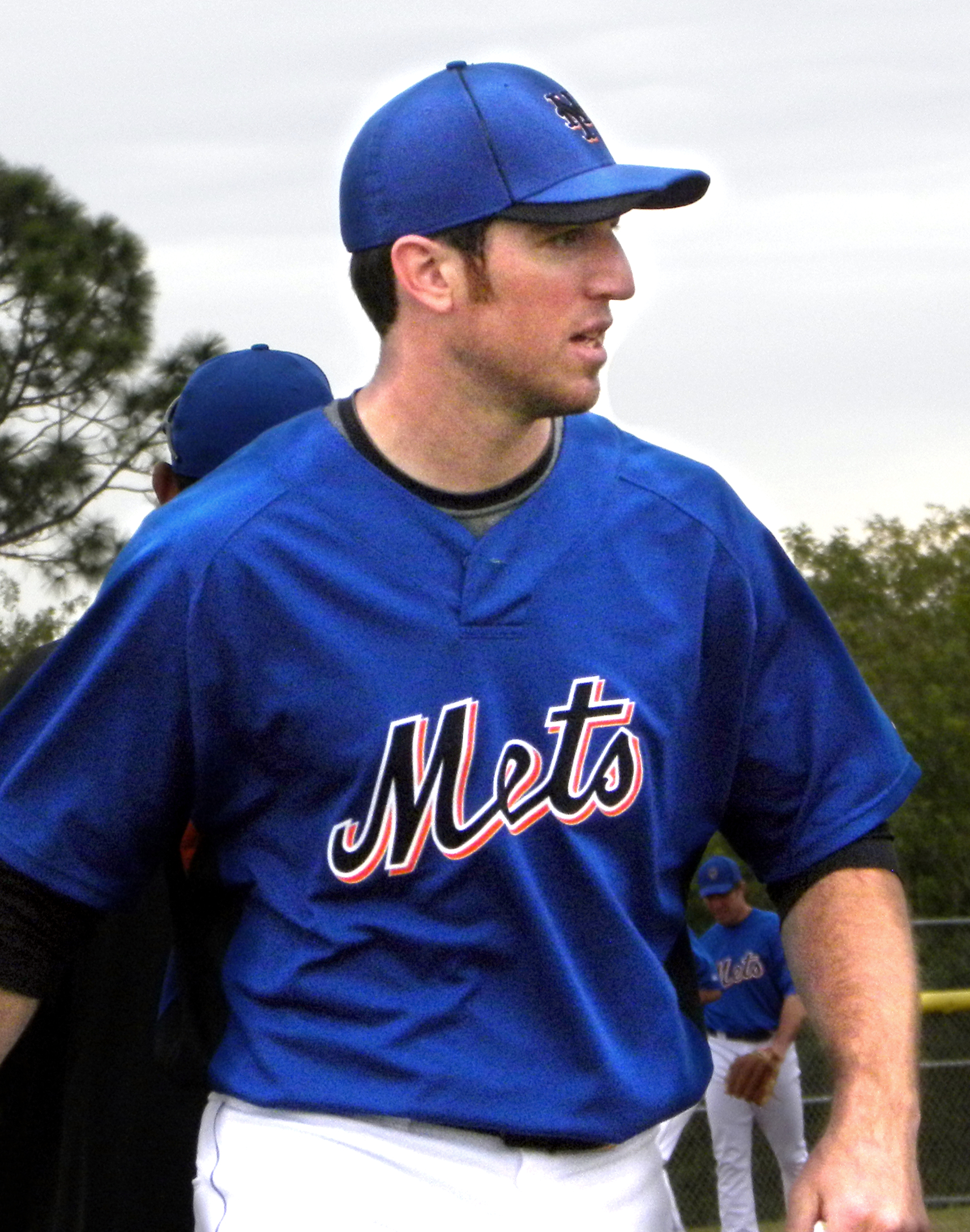
Ike Davis, former first baseman for the New York Mets

The St. Lucie Mets are a Minor League Baseball team of the Florida State League and the Single-A affiliate of the New York Mets. They are located in Port St. Lucie, Florida, and play their home games at Clover Park. The Mets have been members of the Florida State League since their founding in 1988. They originally competed at the Class A level before being elevated to Class A-Advanced in 1990.

In conjunction with Major League Baseball's restructuring of Minor League Baseball in 2021, the Mets were organized into the Low-A Southeast at the Low-A classification. They retained their affiliation with the New York Mets. In 2022, the Low-A Southeast became known as the Florida State League, the name historically used by the regional circuit prior to the 2021 reorganization, and was reclassified as a Single-A circuit.

They have won the Florida State League championship six times (1988, 1996, 1998, 2003, 2006, and 2022).

== Playoffs ==
- 2025: Lost to Daytona 2–0 in semifinals.
- 2022: Defeated Palm Beach 2–0 in semifinals; defeated Dunedin 2–0 to win championship.
- 2016: Lost to Bradenton 2–0 in semifinals.
- 2012: Lost to Jupiter 2–1 in semifinals.
- 2011: Defeated Bradenton 2–1 in semifinals; lost to Daytona 3–1 in finals.
- 2007: Lost to Brevard County 2–1 in semifinals.
- 2006: Defeated Palm Beach 2–0 in semifinals; defeated Dunedin 3–0 to win championship.
- 2003: Defeated Jupiter 2–0 in semifinals; defeated Dunedin 3–1 to win championship.
- 2000: Lost to Daytona 2–0 in semifinals.
- 1998: Defeated Jupiter 2–0 in semifinals; defeated Tampa 3–2 to win championship.
- 1996: Defeated Vero Beach 2–0 in semifinals; defeated Clearwater 3–1 to win championship.
- 1993: Defeated Lakeland 2–1 in semifinals; lost to Clearwater 3–1 in finals.
- 1992: Lost to Osceola 2–0 in quarterfinals.
- 1991: Defeated Sarasota 2–1 in quarterfinals; lost to Clearwater 2–1 in semifinals.
- 1990: Lost to Vero Beach 2–1 in quarterfinals.
- 1989: Lost to Charlotte 2–1 in semifinals.
- 1988: Defeated Lakeland 2–1 in quarterfinals; defeated Tampa 2–0 in semifinals; defeated Osceola 2–0 to win championship.

== Roster ==
St. Lucie Mets roster
| Players | Coaches/Other |
|---|---|
| Pitchers: 29 Luis Alvarez; 21 Frank Camarillo; 66 Nicolas Carreno; 54 Felix Cepeda; 53 Joe Charles; 48 Jose Chirinos; 60 Jorge De Leon; 52 Ryan Dollar; -- Daviel Hurtado; 58 Joel Lara; 19 Tyler McLoughlin; 55 Ernesto Mercedes; 39 Elwis Mijares; 32 Christian Rodriguez; 26 Joe Scarborough; 45 Cam Tilly; 20 Omar Victorino; 22 Conner Ware; 25 Caden Wooster; Catchers: 27 Chase Meggers; 59 Francisco Toledo; 13 Julio Zayas; Infielders: 11 Randy Guzman; 34 Eddinson Paulino; 3 Elian Pena; 4 Sam Robertson; -- Jeremy Rodriguez; 10 Kevin Villavicencio; Outfielders: 12 JT Benson; 49 Sam Biller; 2 Simon Juan; 1 AJ Salgado | Manager: 9 Luis Rivera; Coaches: 30 Jonathan Cramman (bench); 51 David Mervis (pitching); 23 Bryan Muniz (hitting); 40 Jimmy Nelson (assistant pitching); 60-day injured list: -- Candido Cuevas; -- Jace Hampson; -- Ethan Lanthier; -- Wilson Lopez; -- Edgar Moreta; -- Trey Snyder; 7-day injured list; * On New York Mets 40-man roster; ~ Development list; # Rehab assignment; ∞ Reserve list; ‡ Restricted list; § Suspended list; † Temporarily inactive list; Roster updated April 1, 2026; Transactions; → More rosters: MiLB • Florida State League; → New York Mets minor league players |

== Notable alumni ==
Baseball Hall of Fame alumni

- Carlos Beltran (2010) Inducted 2026
- Gary Carter (2006, MGR) Inducted, 2003
- Pedro Martinez (2007-2008) Inducted, 2015
- Mike Piazza Inducted, 2016
- Billy Wagner (2009) Inducted, 2025

Notable alumni

- Rick Aguilera (1988) 3 x MLB All-Star
- Edgardo Alfonzo (1992)(2010, MGR) MLB All-Star
- Moises Alou (2008) 6 x MLB All-Star
- Jason Bay (2002, 2011–2012) 3 x MLB All-Star; 2004 NL Rookie of the Year
- Heath Bell (2000) 3 x MLB All-Star
- Jeromy Burnitz (1990) MLB All-Star
- Mike Cameron (2005) MLB All-Star
- Luis Castillo (2010) 3 x MLB All-Star
- Yoenis Cespedes (2016) 2 x MLB All-Star
- Endy Chavez (2005, 2007)
- Vince Coleman (1992) 2 x MLB All-Star; 1985 NL Rookie of the Year
- Tony Clark (2003) MLB All-Star
- David Cone (2003) 5 x MLB All-Star; 1994 NL Cy Young Award
- Michael Cuddyer (2015) 2 x MLB All-Star; 2013 NL Batting Title
- Jacob deGrom 3 x MLB All-Star; 2014 NL Rookie of the Year; 2018 NL ERA Title; 2018 NL Cy Young Award
- Octavio Dotel (1995-1997)
- Sid Fernandez (1991, 1993) MLB All-Star
- Cliff Floyd (2004, 2006) MLB All-Star
- John Franco (2003) 4 x MLB All-Star
- Darryl Hamilton (2000)
- Pete Harnisch (1996-1997) MLB All-Star
- Matt Harvey (2011) MLB All-Star
- Keith Hernandez (1989) 5 x MLB All-Star; 1979 NL Most Valuable Player
- Orlando Hernandez (2008)
- Todd Hundley (1988, 1998) 2 x MLB-All Star
- Clint Hurdle (1988-1989, MGR) 2013 NL Manager of the Year
- Jason Isringhausen (1994, 1997) 2 x MLB All-Star
- Scott Kazmir (2003)
- Doug Mientkiewicz (2005)
- Melvin Mora (1998) MLB All-Star
- Guillermo Mota (1993)
- Daniel Murphy (2007, 2010, 2015) 3 x MLB All-Star
- Angel Pagan (2002-2003, 2008–2009, 2011)
- Oliver Perez (2009-2010)
- Jose Reyes (2002, 2004, 2010) 4 x MLB All-Star; 2011 NL Batting Title
- Benito Santiago (2005) 5 x MLB All-Star; 1987 NL rookie of the Year
- Pete Schourek (1989)
- Steve Trachsel (2005)
- Justin Turner (2013) MLB All-Star
- Jose Valentin (2007-2008)
- Fernando Vina (1992) MLB All-Star
- Ty Wigginton (2004) MLB All-Star
- Preston Wilson (1996-1997) MLB All-Star
- David Wright (2003, 2011, 2015) 7 x MLB All-Star
