= 2026 Atlanta Braves season =

2026 Atlanta Braves
- National League East champions
- League: National League
- Division: East
- Ballpark: Truist Park
- City: Cumberland
- Record: 94–68 (.580)
- Divisional place: 1st
- General manager: Alex Anthopoulos
- Manager: Walt Weiss
- Television: BravesVision (Brandon Gaudin, C. J. Nitkowski, Jeff Francoeur, Tom Glavine, Nick Green, Kris Medlen, Peter Moylan, Gordon Beckham, Collin McHugh, Ashley ShahAhmadi, Hanna Yates, Wiley Ballard)
- Radio: 680 The Fan; Atlanta Braves Radio Network (Ben Ingram, Kevin McAlpin, Tom Hart, Joe Simpson, Darren O'Day, Kelly Johnson, Chris Dimino, Wiley Ballard); 1600 La Mejor (Daniel Cantú, Emanuel Zamarrón)

The 2026 Atlanta Braves season was the 156th season of the Atlanta Braves franchise, the 61st in Atlanta, and the Braves' 10th season at Truist Park. The Braves were managed by Walt Weiss, in his first season as the team's manager. Following the conclusion of the previous season, longtime manager Brian Snitker announced his retirement and moved into an advisory role with the organization.

With a win over the Los Angeles Dodgers on August 25, the Braves surpassed their disappointing 76–86 record from the previous season. On September 18, the Braves clinched a postseason berth with a win over the Houston Astros, returning to the playoffs for the first time since 2024 after a one-season absence. On September 20, Atlanta clinched the National League East division title for the first time since 2023 with a 4–2 win against the Astros. They defeated their division rival Philadelphia Phillies in the National League Wild Card Series in three games and advanced to the National League Division Series, where they lost to the Los Angeles Dodgers in four games.

== Season standings ==
=== National League East ===
NL East
Team	W	L	Pct.	GB	Home	Road
Atlanta Braves	94	68	.580	—	52‍–‍29	42‍–‍39
Philadelphia Phillies	88	74	.543	6	43‍–‍38	45‍–‍36
Miami Marlins	80	82	.494	14	47‍–‍34	33‍–‍48
Washington Nationals	77	85	.475	17	39‍–‍42	38‍–‍43
New York Mets	74	88	.457	20	36‍–‍45	38‍–‍43

=== National League Wild Card ===
Division leaders
Team	W	L	Pct.
Milwaukee Brewers	103	59	.636
Los Angeles Dodgers	100	62	.617
Atlanta Braves	94	68	.580

Wild Card teams (Top 3 teams qualify for postseason)
Team	W	L	Pct.	GB
San Diego Padres	91	71	.562	+3
Chicago Cubs	89	73	.549	+1
Philadelphia Phillies	88	74	.543	—
Arizona Diamondbacks	86	76	.531	2
Pittsburgh Pirates	82	80	.506	6
Miami Marlins	80	82	.494	8
St. Louis Cardinals	77	85	.475	11
Washington Nationals	77	85	.475	11
Cincinnati Reds	75	87	.463	13
New York Mets	74	88	.457	14
San Francisco Giants	65	97	.401	23
Colorado Rockies	58	104	.358	30

=== Record vs. opponents ===
2026 National League record Source: MLB Standings Grid – 2026
Team	AZ	ATL	CHC	CIN	COL	LAD	MIA	MIL	NYM	PHI	PIT	SD	SF	STL	WSH	AL
Arizona	—	4–3	2–4	4–2	9–4	7–6	1–5	2–4	4–2	3–3	3–3	6–7	10–3	5–2	2–4	24–24
Atlanta	3–4	—	3–3	3–3	6–0	5–1	9–4	3–3	6–7	9–4	5–1	3–4	1–5	2–4	9–4	27–21
Chicago	4–2	3–3	—	9–4	3–3	4–2	3–3	4–9	7–0	6–1	7–6	5–1	3–3	6–7	3–3	22–26
Cincinnati	2–4	3–3	4–9	—	4–2	1–6	3–4	4–9	4–2	3–3	6–7	3–3	3–3	5–8	1–5	29–19
Colorado	4–9	0–6	3–3	2–4	—	3–10	2–5	1–5	4–2	2–4	3–3	2–11	7–6	2–4	3–4	20–28
Los Angeles	6–7	1–5	2–4	6–1	10–3	—	2–4	3–4	5–1	4–2	5–1	8–5	9–4	2–4	6–0	31–17
Miami	5–1	4–9	3–3	4–3	5–2	4–2	—	1–5	6–7	5–8	4–2	0–6	4–2	4–2	9–4	22–26
Milwaukee	4–2	3–3	9–4	9–4	5–1	4–3	5–1	—	4–2	4–2	6–7	2–4	3–4	11–2	2–4	32–16
New York	2–4	7–6	0–7	2–4	2–4	1–5	7–6	2–4	—	6–7	4–2	4–2	5–2	2–4	7–6	23–25
Philadelphia	3–3	4–9	1–6	3–3	4–2	2–4	8–5	2–4	7–6	—	5–2	6–0	4–2	4–2	9–4	26–22
Pittsburgh	3–3	1–5	6–7	7–6	3–3	1–5	2–4	7–6	2–4	2–5	—	3–3	3–3	6–7	4–3	32–16
San Diego	7–6	4–3	1–5	3–3	11–2	5–8	6–0	4–2	2–4	0–6	3–3	—	9–4	3–4	4–2	29–19
San Francisco	3–10	5–1	3–3	3–3	6–7	4–9	2–4	4–3	2–5	2–4	3–3	4–9	—	5–1	3–3	16–32
St. Louis	2–5	4–2	7–6	8–5	4–2	4–2	2–4	2–11	4–2	2–4	7–6	4–3	1–5	—	3–3	23–25
Washington	4–2	4–9	3–3	5–1	4–3	0–6	4–9	4–2	6–7	4–9	3–4	2–4	3–3	3–3	—	28–20

Updated with the results of all games through September 27, 2026.

==== Jurickson Profar PED bans ====
On March 3, 2026, Jurickson Profar received a 162-game suspension from Major League Baseball after testing positive for exogenous testosterone. The suspension marked his second violation of MLB's performance-enhancing drug policy within a year; in March 2025, he received an 80-game suspension after testing positive for human chorionic gonadotropin (hCG). As a result of the 162-game suspension, Profar forfeited his $15 million salary for the 2026 season, along with being ineligible for the postseason and the 2026 World Baseball Classic, for which he had been expected to play for the Netherlands.

== Off-season ==
=== Transactions ===
This list is not complete.

October/November 2025

November 2	DH Marcell Ozuna, RHP Charlie Morton and RHP Raisel Iglesias elected free agency
November 4	SS Ha-Seong Kim elected free agency
November 19	Braves signed right-handed pitcher Raisel Iglesias to a 1-year contract
November 19	Houston Astros traded 2B Mauricio Dubón to Atlanta Braves for SS Nick Allen

== Game log ==
Legend
	Braves win
	Braves loss
	Postponement
	Clinched playoff spot
	Clinched division
**Bold**	Braves team member

2026 Game Log: 94–68 (Home: 52–29; Road: 42–39)
March/April: 22–10 (Home: 12–6; Road: 10–4)

#	Date	Opponent	Score	Win	Loss	Save	Attendance	Record	Streak
1	March 27	Royals	6–0	**Sale** (1–0)	Ragans (0–1)	—	39,697	1–0	W1
2	March 28	Royals	6–2	**Bido** (1–0)	Estévez (0–1)	—	39,362	2–0	W2
3	March 29	Royals	1–4	Lugo (1–0)	**Holmes** (0–1)	Erceg (1)	37,961	2–1	L1
4	March 30	Athletics	4–0	**Elder** (1–0)	Lopez (0–1)	—	24,478	3–1	W1
5	March 31	Athletics	2–5	Civale (1–0)	**J. Suárez** (0–1)	Leiter Jr. (1)	30,799	3–2	L1
6	April 1	Athletics	5–1	**Sale** (2–0)	Severino (0–1)	—	27,568	4–2	W1
7	April 2	@ Diamondbacks	17–2	**López** (1–0)	Nelson (0–1)	**Bido** (1)	21,600	5–2	W2
8	April 3	@ Diamondbacks	2–0	**R. Suárez** (1–0)	Sewald (0–1)	**Iglesias** (1)	29,192	6–2	W3
9	April 4	@ Diamondbacks	1–2	Soroka (2–0)	**Elder** (1–1)	Sewald (3)	37,457	6–3	L1
10	April 5	@ Diamondbacks	5–6 (10)	Rashi (1–0)	**Payamps** (0–1)	—	25,814	6–4	L2
11	April 6	@ Angels	2–6	Soriano (3–0)	**Sale** (2–1)	Romano (4)	25,471	6–5	L3
12	April 7	@ Angels	7–2	**Kinley** (1–0)	Kikuchi (0–2)	**Iglesias** (2)	40,450	7–5	W1
13	April 8	@ Angels	8–2	**Holmes** (1–1)	Detmers (0–1)	—	21,375	8–5	W2
14	April 10	Guardians	11–5	**Kinley** (2–0)	Cecconi (0–2)	—	40,363	9–5	W3
15	April 11	Guardians	0–6	Messick (2–0)	**Pérez** (0–1)	—	40,195	9–6	L1
16	April 12	Guardians	13–1	**Sale** (3–1)	Bibee (0–2)	**Dodd** (1)	29,084	10–6	W1
17	April 13	Marlins	4–10	Nardi (1–0)	**Bummer** (0–1)	—	22,912	10–7	L1
18	April 14	Marlins	6–5	**R. Suárez** (2–0)	Fairbanks (0–1)	**Iglesias** (3)	27,441	11–7	W1
19	April 15	Marlins	6–3	**Elder** (2–1)	Paddack (0–3)	**Iglesias** (4)	28,884	12–7	W2
20	April 17	@ Phillies	9–0	**Pérez** (1–1)	Walker (1–3)	**J. Suárez** (1)	43,048	13–7	W3
21	April 18	@ Phillies	3–1	**Sale** (4–1)	Sánchez (2–2)	**R. Suárez** (1)	43,423	14–7	W4
22	April 19	@ Phillies	4–2	**Kinley** (3–0)	Painter (1–1)	**Iglesias** (5)	36,806	15–7	W5
23	April 20	@ Nationals	9–4	**Elder** (3–1)	Irvin (1–3)	—	12,022	16–7	W6
24	April 21	@ Nationals	4–11	Griffin (3–0)	**López** (1–1)	—	16,483	16–8	L1
25	April 22	@ Nationals	8–6	**Lee** (1–0)	Littell (0–3)	**R. Suárez** (2)	16,308	17–8	W1
26	April 23	@ Nationals	7–2	**Ritchie** (1–0)	Pérez (1–3)	—	14,613	18–8	W2
27	April 24	Phillies	5–3	**Holmes** (2–1)	Painter (1–2)	**R. Suárez** (3)	39,627	19–8	W3
28	April 25	Phillies	5–8 (10)	Keller (1–0)	**Kinley** (3–1)	—	39,324	19–9	L1
29	April 26	Phillies	6–2	**Sale** (5–1)	Nola (1–3)	—	39,213	20–9	W1
30	April 28	Tigers	5–2	**Pérez** (2–1)	Mize (2–2)	—	32,162	21–9	W2
31	April 29	Tigers	4–3	**López** (2–1)	Jansen (0–2)	—	30,439	22–9	W3
32	April 30	Tigers	2–5	Anderson (1–0)	**Payamps** (0–2)	Finnegan (1)	32,620	22–10	L1

May: 18–10 (Home: 5–4; Road: 13–6)

#	Date	Opponent	Score	Win	Loss	Save	Attendance	Record	Streak
33	May 1	@ Rockies	8–6	**Fuentes** (1–0)	Mejía (0–3)	**R. Suárez** (4)	23,548	23–10	W1
34	May 2	@ Rockies	9–1	**Sale** (6–1)	Bernardino (2–1)	—	38,569	24–10	W2
35	May 3	@ Rockies	11–6	**Bummer** (1–1)	Freeland (1–3)	—	32,994	25–10	W3
36	May 4	@ Mariners	4–5	Gilbert (2–3)	**Kinley** (3–2)	Muñoz (7)	26,934	25–11	L1
37	May 5	@ Mariners	3–2	**R. Suárez** (3–0)	Muñoz (3–3)	**Iglesias** (6)	27,128	26–11	W1
38	May 6	@ Mariners	1–3	Woo (2–2)	**Pérez** (2–2)	Ferrer (2)	23,648	26–12	L1
39	May 8	@ Dodgers	1–3	Vesia (1–0)	**Sale** (6–2)	Scott (3)	51,255	26–13	L2
40	May 9	@ Dodgers	7–2	**Strider** (1–0)	Snell (0–1)	—	50,209	27–13	W1
41	May 10	@ Dodgers	7–2	**Elder** (4–1)	Wrobleski (5–1)	—	49,514	28–13	W2
42	May 12	Cubs	5–2	**Fuentes** (2–0)	Rea (4–2)	**Iglesias** (7)	38,342	29–13	W3
43	May 13	Cubs	4–1	**R. Suárez** (4–0)	Imanaga (4–3)	**Iglesias** (8)	35,540	30–13	W4
44	May 14	Cubs	0–2	Milner (1–0)	**Sale** (6–3)	Palenica (3)	36,367	30–14	L1
45	May 15	Red Sox	3–2 (10)	**Fuentes** (3–0)	Samaniego (0–2)	—	39,288	31–14	W1
46	May 16	Red Sox	2–3	Tolle (2–2)	**Elder** (4–2)	Chapman (10)	39,336	31–15	L1
47	May 17	Red Sox	8–1	**Holmes** (3–1)	Bello (2–5)	—	37,800	32–15	W1
48	May 18	@ Marlins	0–12	Meyer (4–0)	**Ritchie** (1–1)	—	8,672	32–16	L1
49	May 19	@ Marlins	8–4	**Lee** (2–0)	Faucher (4–3)	—	7,521	33–16	W1
50	May 20	@ Marlins	9–1	**Sale** (7–3)	Junk (2–5)	—	9,617	34–16	W2
51	May 21	@ Marlins	9–3	**Strider** (2–0)	Alcántara (3–3)	—	8,834	35–16	W3
52	May 22	Nationals	5–4 (11)	**Kinley** (4–2)	Schultz (0–2)	—	36,082	36–16	W4
53	May 23	Nationals	0–2	Irvin (2–4)	**Holmes** (3–2)	Lovelady (4)	35,819	36–17	L1
54	May 24	Nationals	1–2	Griffin (6–2)	**Pérez** (2–3)	Ribalta (2)	36,429	36–18	L2
55	May 26	@ Red Sox	7–6	**Strider** (3–0)	Suárez (2–3)	**Iglesias** (9)	34,126	37–18	W1
56	May 27	@ Red Sox	0–8	Early (5–2)	**Elder** (4–3)	—	34,093	37–19	L1
57	May 28	@ Red Sox	10–2	**Sale** (8–3)	Coulombe (0–2)	—	30,901	38–19	W1
58	May 29	@ Reds	8–3	**Fuentes** (4–0)	Paddack (0–7)	—	29,996	39–19	W2
59	May 30	@ Reds	5–2	**Pérez** (3–3)	Singer (2–5)	**Iglesias** (10)	36,848	40–19	W3
60	May 31	@ Reds	4–6	Lodolo (2–1)	**Strider** (3–1)	Moll (1)	31,084	40–20	L1

June: 9–14 (Home: 7–5; Road: 2–9)

#	Date	Opponent	Score	Win	Loss	Save	Attendance	Record	Streak
61	June 2	Blue Jays	4–3	**Elder** (5–3)	Gausman (4–4)	**Iglesias** (11)	30,937	41–20	W1
62	June 3	Blue Jays	7–3	**Holmes** (4–2)	Corbin (2–2)	—	37,178	42–20	W2
63	June 4	Blue Jays	2–7	Dallas (1–0)	**Sale** (8–4)	Varland (9)	30,598	42–21	L1
64	June 5	Pirates	6–3	**Pérez** (4–3)	Keller (5–3)	**Iglesias** (12)	39,418	43–21	W1
65	June 6	Pirates	6–3	**Strider** (4–1)	Ashcraft (5–3)	**Iglesias** (13)	40,276	44–21	W2
66	June 7	Pirates	3–2	**López** (3–1)	Chandler (2–7)	**Fuentes** (1)	37,697	45–21	W3
67	June 9	@ White Sox	5–6 (10)	Taylor (2–0)	**Iglesias** (0–1)	—	20,494	45–22	L1
68	June 10	@ White Sox	1–2	Martin (9–2)	**Sale** (8–5)	Hudson (3)	14,622	45–23	L2
–	June 11	@ White Sox	Postponed (rain); Makeup: August 20						
69	June 12	@ Mets	5–7	Pérez (3–3)	**Strider** (4–2)	Williams (10)	38,438	45–24	L3
70	June 13	@ Mets	3–1	**Pérez** (5–3)	Manaea (1–2)	**Iglesias** (14)	38,269	46–24	W1
71	June 14	@ Mets	1–8	Peralta (5–5)	**Elder** (5–4)	—	40,106	46–25	L1
–	June 16	Giants	Suspended in 2nd inning (rain); resumed June 17 as part of a doubleheader						
72	June 17	Giants	2–7	Ray (5–6)	**Holmes** (4–3)	—	31,266	46–26	L2
73	June 17	Giants	5–7	Whisenhunt (1–0)	**Ritchie** (1–2)	Beck (1)	35,449	46–27	L3
–	June 18	Giants	Postponed (rain); Makeup: August 31						
74	June 19	Brewers	3–2	**Pérez** (6–3)	Misiorowski (8–3)	**Iglesias** (15)	40,107	47–27	W1
75	June 20	Brewers	4–3	**Lee** (3–0)	Ashby (10–1)	—	40,156	48–27	W2
76	June 21	Brewers	4–9	Gasser (1–3)	**Elder** (5–5)	Patrick (4)	39,344	48–28	L1
77	June 22	@ Padres	0–1	King (5–6)	**Holmes** (4–4)	Miller (21)	42,572	48–29	L2
78	June 23	@ Padres	6–7 (10)	Miller (2–1)	**Iglesias** (0–2)	—	41,379	48–30	L3
79	June 24	@ Padres	2–5	Sears (1–0)	**Pérez** (6–4)	Adam (2)	40,183	48–31	L4
80	June 26	@ Giants	3–1	**Lee** (4–0)	McDonald (2–6)	**Iglesias** (16)	39,051	49–31	W1
81	June 27	@ Giants	0–5	Webb (5–5)	**Elder** (5–6)	—	35,140	49–32	L1
82	June 28	@ Giants	2–3	Ray (7–6)	**Sale** (8–6)	Kilian (6)	33,138	49–33	L2
83	June 30	Cardinals	3–5	Liberatore (4–5)	**Pérez** (6–5)	O'Brien (21)	32,932	49–34	L3

July: 16–11 (Home: 10–5; Road: 6–6)

#	Date	Opponent	Score	Win	Loss	Save	Attendance	Record	Streak
84	July 1	Cardinals	5–1	**López** (4–1)	McGreevy (3–7)	—	27,361	50–34	W1
85	July 2	Cardinals	5–11	Graceffo (6–1)	**Kinley** (4–3)	—	34,524	50–35	L1
86	July 3	Mets	5–3	**Holmes** (5–4)	Scott (2–1)	**Iglesias** (17)	39,138	51–35	W1
87	July 4	Mets	14–3	**Sale** (9–6)	Manaea (1–4)	**Ritchie** (1)	40,168	52–35	W2
88	July 5	Mets	9–10	McLean (6–5)	**Pérez** (6–6)	Williams (13)	28,621	52–36	L1
89	July 6	Mets	6–7 (10)	Raley (3–3)	**Murphy** (0–1)	Weaver (1)	31,445	52–37	L2
90	July 7	@ Pirates	4–12	Skenes (7–8)	**Waldrep** (0–1)	—	20,281	52–38	L3
91	July 8	@ Pirates	4–0	**Dodd** (1–0)	Santana (2–4)	**Iglesias** (18)	20,062	53–38	W1
92	July 9	@ Pirates	10–5	**Dodd** (2–0)	Keller (6–7)	—	20,895	54–38	W2
93	July 10	@ Cardinals	1–2	Romero (1–2)	**Young** (0–1)	O'Brien (23)	26,609	54–39	L1
94	July 11	@ Cardinals	1–4	Liberatore (5–6)	**López** (4–2)	O'Brien (24)	29,122	54–40	L2
95	July 12	@ Cardinals	4–3	**Kinley** (5–3)	Romero (1–3)	**Iglesias** (19)	30,234	55–40	W1
–	July 14	**96th All-Star Game: Philadelphia, PA**							
96	July 17	Rangers	15–1	**Sale** (10–6)	Quantrill (3–2)	—	40,147	56–40	W2
97	July 18	Rangers	6–7	Gore (6–8)	**Kinley** (5–4)	Latz (19)	37,056	56–41	L1
98	July 19	Rangers	8–5	**Holmes** (6–4)	Eovaldi (9–8)	—	29,856	57–41	W1
99	July 20	Padres	3–2	**Elder** (6–6)	Sears (2–3)	**Mederos** (1)	31,263	58–41	W2
100	July 21	Padres	3–8	Buehler (6–5)	**López** (4–3)	—	31,870	58–42	L1
101	July 22	Padres	7–6	**Lee** (5–0)	Peralta (1–2)	**Iglesias** (20)	33,766	59–42	W1
102	July 23	Padres	6–5	**Sale** (11–6)	Canning (1–9)	**Iglesias** (21)	29,441	60–42	W2
103	July 24	@ Orioles	7–6 (10)	**Hernández** (1–0)	Kittredge (1–2)	—	35,775	61–42	W3
104	July 25	@ Orioles	2–3	Cano (2–2)	**Fuentes** (4–1)	—	37,883	61–43	L1
105	July 26	@ Orioles	3–2 (11)	**Kinley** (6–4)	Kittredge (1–3)	—	25,032	62–43	W1
106	July 27	@ Mets	3–14	Thornton (2–1)	**Thomas** (0–1)	—	29,466	62–44	L1
–	July 28	@ Mets	Postponed (rain); Makeup: July 29 as part of a doubleheader						
107	July 29	@ Mets	2–3	Brazobán (5–2)	**Dodd** (2–1)	Williams (15)	28,493	62–45	L2
108	July 29	@ Mets	1–0	**Sale** (12–6)	Scott (3–3)	**Iglesias** (22)	22,672	63–45	W1
109	July 30	Nationals	5–4	**Mederos** (1–0)	Irvin (2–5)	**Iglesias** (23)	35,418	64–45	W2
110	July 31	Nationals	6–2	**Elder** (7–6)	Griffin (12–3)	**Hernández** (1)	37,664	65–45	W3

August: 17–11 (Home: 14–4; Road: 3–7)

#	Date	Opponent	Score	Win	Loss	Save	Attendance	Record	Streak
111	August 1	Nationals	8–3	**Pérez** (7–6)	Mikolas (3–8)	—	38,625	66–45	W4
112	August 2	Nationals	4–2	**Dodd** (3–1)	Cavalli (8–5)	**Iglesias** (24)	27,143	67–45	W5
113	August 4	Marlins	4–2	**Holmes** (7–4)	Gusto (0–3)	—	26,374	68–45	W6
114	August 5	Marlins	4–1	**Elder** (8–6)	Pérez (5–9)	**Fuentes** (2)	25,136	69–45	W7
115	August 6	Marlins	11–3	**Mederos** (2–0)	Junk (5–7)	—	33,500	70–45	W8
116	August 7	@ Yankees	2–3 (10)	Bednar (5–3)	**Kinley** (6–5)	—	42,297	70–46	L1
117	August 8	@ Yankees	4–5	Cole (6–5)	**Sale** (12–7)	Bednar (26)	45,222	70–47	L2
118	August 9	@ Yankees	2–1 (10)	**Iglesias** (1–2)	Blackburn (3–2)	**Kinley** (1)	42,533	71–47	W1
119	August 10	Mets	5–8	Duarte (1–0)	**Elder** (8–7)	Senga (1)	28,402	71–48	L1
120	August 11	Mets	4–0	**Pérez** (8–6)	McLean (8–8)	—	24,711	72–48	W1
121	August 12	Mets	6–3	**Mahle** (4–9)	Thornton (3–3)	—	26,415	73–48	W2
122	August 14	Diamondbacks	0–2	Pfaadt (7–1)	**Sale** (12–8)	Garcia (4)	35,106	73–49	L1
123	August 15	Diamondbacks	3–10	Rodríguez (12–4)	**Holmes** (7–5)	—	39,693	73–50	L2
124	August 16	Diamondbacks	5–3	**Fuentes** (5–1)	Clarke (2–3)	**Iglesias** (25)	29,629	74–50	W1
125	August 17	@ Twins	2–4	Adams (3–0)	**Pérez** (8–7)	Gómez (18)	19,990	74–51	L1
126	August 18	@ Twins	1–4	Matthews (7–8)	**Mahle** (4–10)	Gómez (19)	22,193	74–52	L2
127	August 19	@ Twins	4–6	Minter (2–2)	**Mederos** (2–1)	Gómez (20)	20,316	74–53	L3
128	August 20	@ White Sox	2–0	**Holmes** (8–5)	Kay (9–6)	**Iglesias** (26)	17,052	75–53	W1
129	August 21	@ Brewers	1–2	Misiorowski (13–5)	**Sale** (12–9)	Megill (24)	40,130	75–54	L1
130	August 22	@ Brewers	1–4	Henderson (8–2)	**Pérez** (8–8)	Ashby (2)	42,298	75–55	L2
131	August 23	@ Brewers*	4–2	**Mahle** (5–10)	Drohan (6–5)	**Iglesias** (27)	2,432	76–55	W1
132	August 25	Dodgers	4–3	**Dodd** (4–1)	Scott (1–4)	**Iglesias** (28)	36,832	77–55	W2
133	August 26	Dodgers	6–5	**Mederos** (3–1)	Scott (1–5)	—	37,227	78–55	W3
134	August 27	Dodgers	1–0	**Sale** (13–9)	Yamamoto (12–8)	—	39,650	79–55	W4
135	August 28	Rockies	6–4	**Holmes** (9–5)	Sugano (12–8)	**Iglesias** (29)	38,006	80–55	W5
136	August 29	Rockies	2–1	**Suter** (2–2)	Hill (0–3)	**Fuentes** (3)	40,129	81–55	W6
137	August 30	Rockies	3–2 (10)	**Mederos** (4–1)	Feltner (5–9)	—	31,776	82–55	W7
138	August 31	Giants	3–7	Molina (2–0)	**Elder** (8–8)	—	29,349	82–56	L1
*August 23 game played at Bowman Field in Williamsport, Pennsylvania

September: 12–12 (Home: 4–5; Road: 8–7)

#	Date	Opponent	Score	Win	Loss	Save	Attendance	Record	Streak
139	September 1	@ Nationals	5–9	Simpson (1–0)	**Smith-Shawver** (0–1)	—	18,975	82–57	L2
140	September 2	@ Nationals	9–0	**Hernández** (2–0)	Cornelio (2–2)	—	15,248	83–57	W1
141	September 4	@ Phillies	5–2	**Sale** (14–9)	Sánchez (16–5)	**Iglesias** (30)	41,883	84–57	W2
142	September 5	@ Phillies	2–4	Wheeler (12–5)	**Pérez** (8–9)	Duran (30)	43,241	84–58	L1
143	September 6	@ Phillies	5–4	**Lee** (6–0)	Duran (2–5)	**Iglesias** (31)	42,793	85–58	W1
144	September 7	@ Phillies	0–1	Luzardo (14–5)	**Fuentes** (5–2)	—	41,820	85–59	L1
145	September 8	Rays	1–7	Peralta (8–11)	**Smith-Shawver** (0–2)	—	30,969	85–60	L2
146	September 9	Rays	2–7	Jax (7–10)	**López** (4–4)	—	30,969	85–61	L3
147	September 10	Rays	3–1	**Fuentes** (6–2)	Kelly (6–4)	**Iglesias** (32)	31,664	86–61	W1
148	September 11	Phillies	6–5 (11)	**Fuentes** (7–2)	Raley (5–6)	—	40,161	87–61	W2
149	September 12	Phillies	12–2	**Mahle** (6–10)	Raley (5–7)	—	40,863	88–61	W3
150	September 13	Phillies	4–9	Alvarado (4–3)	**Lee** (6–1)	—	39,830	88–62	L1
151	September 14	@ Cubs	3–7	Peterson (8–8)	**López** (4–5)	—	34,515	88–63	L2
152	September 15	@ Cubs	6–3	**Pérez** (9–9)	Webb (6–5)	**Iglesias** (33)	38,516	89–63	W1
153	September 16	@ Cubs	4–8	Imanaga (11–10)	**Ritchie** (1–3)	—	35,779	89–64	L1
154	September 18	@ Astros	6–2	**Mahle** (7–10)	Lambert (8–10)	—	36,921	90–64	W1
155	September 19	@ Astros	6–3	**Holmes** (10–5)	Blubaugh (5–3)	**Iglesias** (34)	41,147	91–64	W2
156	September 20	@ Astros	4–2	**Mederos** (5–1)	King (3–6)	**Dodd** (2)	36,612	92–64	W3
157	September 22	Reds	0–4	Williamson (5–4)	**Ritchie** (1–4)	—	38,214	92–65	L1
158	September 23	Reds	3–2 (10)	**Suter** (3–2)	Mey (0–1)	—	39,680	93–65	W1
159	September 24	Reds	6–7	Phillips (2–0)	**Smith-Shawver** (0–3)	Pagán (25)	40,165	93–66	L1
160	September 25	@ Marlins	0–3	Pérez (8–11)	**Holmes** (10–6)	—	26,060	93–67	L2
161	September 26	@ Marlins	8–3	**Mederos** (6–1)	Ralston (0–3)	—	35,414	94–67	W1
162	September 27	@ Marlins	3–5	Petersen (4–4)	**Ritchie** (1–5)	Alcántara (3)	35,730	94–68	L1

== Postseason ==
=== Game log ===
2026 Postseason Game Log: 3–4 (Home: 2–3; Away: 1–1)
NL Wild Card Series: 2–1 (Home: 2–1; Away: 0–0)

#	Date	Opponent	Score	Win	Loss	Save	Attendance	Series
1	September 29	Phillies	5–3	Lee (1–0)	Durán (0–1)	Iglesias (1)	30,127	1–0
2	September 30	Phillies	3–4 (10)	Painter (1–0)	Fuentes (0–1)	—	37,150	1–1
3	October 1	Phillies	6–2	Holmes (1–0)	Nola (0–1)	—	41,731	2–1

NL Division Series: 1–3 (Home: 0–2; Away: 1–1)

#	Date	Opponent	Score	Win	Loss	Save	Attendance	Series
1	October 3	@ Dodgers	3–5	Skubal (1–0)	Mederos (0–1)	Phillips (1)	50,194	0–1
2	October 4	@ Dodgers	3–2	Lee (2–0)	Bubic (0–1)	Iglesias (2)	50,729	1–1
3	October 6	Dodgers	1–3	Yamamoto (1–0)	Sale (0–1)	Díaz (1)	42,420	1–2
4	October 7	Dodgers	1–4	Henriquez (1–0)	Mahle (0–1)	Díaz (2)	41,173	1–3

=== Postseason rosters ===
Playoff rosters
National League Wild Card Series

- Pitchers: 26 Raisel Iglesias 39 Brent Suter 46 Dylan Dodd 51 Chris Sale 52 Dylan Lee 54 Tyler Mahle 58 Víctor Mederos 62 Ray Kerr 66 Grant Holmes 72 Didier Fuentes 75 Robert Suárez
- Catchers: 12 Sean Murphy 30 Drake Baldwin
- Infielders: 1 Ozzie Albies 7 Ha-Seong Kim 11 Rowdy Tellez 27 Austin Riley 28 Matt Olson 37 Luke Williams
- Outfielders: 13 Ronald Acuña Jr. 18 Mike Yastrzemski 23 Michael Harris II 49 DaShawn Keirsey Jr. 53 Brewer Hicklen
- Designated hitters: 8 Dominic Smith
- Utility: 14 Mauricio Dubón

National League Division Series

- Pitchers: 26 Raisel Iglesias 32 AJ Smith-Shawver 39 Brent Suter 46 Dylan Dodd 51 Chris Sale 52 Dylan Lee 54 Tyler Mahle 58 Víctor Mederos 60 JR Ritchie 62 Ray Kerr 66 Grant Holmes 72 Didier Fuentes 75 Robert Suárez
- Catchers: 12 Sean Murphy 30 Drake Baldwin
- Infielders: 1 Ozzie Albies 7 Ha-Seong Kim 11 Rowdy Tellez 27 Austin Riley 28 Matt Olson
- Outfielders: 13 Ronald Acuña Jr. 18 Mike Yastrzemski 20 Lane Thomas 23 Michael Harris II 53 Brewer Hicklen
- Utility: 14 Mauricio Dubón

== Roster ==
2026 Atlanta Braves
Roster
Pitchers: 70 Osvaldo Bido; 49 Aaron Bummer; 76 Blake Burkhalter; 59 Carlos Carrasco; 46 Dylan Dodd; 55 Bryce Elder; 70 Bailey Falter; 75 Didier Fuentes; 71 Ian Hamilton; 57 Elieser Hernández; 66 Grant Holmes; 26 Raisel Iglesias; 00 James Karinchak; 62 Ray Kerr; 45 Tyler Kinley; 52 Dylan Lee; 40 Reynaldo López; 54 Tyler Mahle; 58 Víctor Mederos; 61 Anthony Molina; 70 Rolddy Muñoz; 73 Owen Murphy; 34 Joel Payamps; 33 Martín Pérez; 60 JR Ritchie; 51 Chris Sale; 32 AJ Smith-Shawver; 65 Hunter Stratton; 99 Spencer Strider; 54 José Suárez; 75 Robert Suárez; 39 Brent Suter; 65 Connor Thomas; 30 Hurston Waldrep; 63 Danny Young	Catchers: 30 Drake Baldwin; 16 Joey Bart; 78 Jaír Camargo; 20 Jonah Heim; 9 Sandy León; 12 Sean Murphy; 39 Chadwick Tromp; 16 Austin Wynns; Infielders: 1 Ozzie Albies; 15 Kyle Farmer; 74 Jim Jarvis; 7 Ha-seong Kim; 2 Jorge Mateo; 28 Matt Olson; 27 Austin Riley; 8 Dominic Smith; 11 Rowdy Tellez; 37 Luke Williams	Outfielders: 13 Ronald Acuña Jr.; 38 José Azócar; 14 Mauricio Dubón; 23 Michael Harris II; 53 Brewer Hicklen; 49 DaShawn Keirsey Jr.; 20 Lane Thomas; 36 Eli White; 18 Mike Yastrzemski	Manager: 22 Walt Weiss; Coaches: 88 Darnell Coles (assistant hitting); 83 Tony Diaz (assistant); 81 Dustin Garneau (catching); 85 Jeremy Hefner (pitching); 80 Tim Hyers (hitting); 10 Chipper Jones (hitting consultant); 89 Tony Mansolino (bench); 87 J.P. Martinez (bullpen); 98 Wigberto Nevarez (bullpen catcher); 95 Eddie Pérez (assistant); 86 Antoan Richardson (first base); 84 Tommy Watkins (third base); 96 José Yepez (bullpen catcher)

== Player stats ==
= Indicates team leader

= Indicates league leader

=== Batting ===
Note: G = Games played; AB = At bats; R = Runs scored; H = Hits; 2B = Doubles; 3B = Triples; HR = Home runs; RBI = Runs batted in; SB = Stolen bases; BB = Walks; AVG = Batting average; SLG = Slugging average

Player	G	AB	R	H	2B	3B	HR	RBI	SB	BB	AVG	SLG
Matt Olson	162	625	99	157	34	0	41	93	4	64	.251	.502
Ozzie Albies	162	615	85	146	27	1	22	73	4	46	.237	.392
Michael Harris II	155	591	79	174	36	1	26	87	12	23	.294	.491
Mauricio Dubón	153	572	66	168	28	3	12	73	10	35	.276	.399
Austin Riley	159	566	64	124	21	2	19	72	9	48	.219	.364
Drake Baldwin	138	549	85	156	21	0	25	79	3	55	.284	.459
Ronald Acuña Jr.	107	408	61	104	18	1	20	55	21	53	.255	.451
Mike Yastrzemski	139	361	51	81	18	1	12	41	1	41	.224	.380
Dominic Smith	108	269	40	68	6	1	9	46	0	23	.253	.383
Eli White	69	133	17	31	6	1	5	17	4	9	.233	.406
Jorge Mateo	65	129	29	31	6	0	4	11	10	8	.240	.380
Ha-seong Kim	51	129	11	15	1	1	0	9	2	16	.116	140
Jim Jarvis	38	111	10	23	5	1	1	11	0	8	.207	.297
Sean Murphy	33	110	11	20	4	0	3	10	0	11	.182	.300
Joey Bart	20	48	4	9	3	0	2	7	0	4	.188	.375
Sandy León	21	44	0	4	0	0	0	0	0	0	.091	.091
Lane Thomas	21	41	6	7	3	0	1	3	2	5	.171	.317
Brewer Hicklen	20	39	9	10	5	0	0	3	0	8	.256	.385
Jonah Heim	12	39	4	9	4	0	1	8	0	5	.231	.410
Chadwick Tromp	12	25	1	5	1	0	0	3	0	0	.200	.240
Kyle Farmer	14	18	2	4	1	0	0	3	0	0	.222	.278
José Azócar	11	17	2	6	2	0	0	0	1	1	.353	.471
Austin Wynns	6	14	0	1	0	0	0	0	0	0	.071	.071
Rowdy Tellez	7	10	2	2	0	0	1	4	0	1	.200	.500
DaShawn Keirsey Jr.	5	5	3	1	0	0	0	1	0	0	.200	.200
Jaír Camargo	1	2	1	1	1	0	0	0	0	0	.500	1.000
Victor Mederos	3	1	0	1	0	0	0	2	0	0	1.000	1.000
Luke Williams	2	0	0	0	0	0	0	0	0	1	.---	.---
Totals	162	5471	742	1348	251	13	204	711	83	465	.246	.409

=== Pitching ===
Note: W = Wins; L = Losses; ERA = Earned run average; G = Games pitched; GS = Games started; SV = Saves; IP = Innings pitched; H = Hits allowed; R = Runs allowed; ER = Earned runs allowed; BB = Walks allowed; SO = Strikeouts

Player	W	L	ERA	G	GS	SV	IP	H	R	ER	BB	SO
Chris Sale	14	9	2.16	27	27	0	162.2	129	44	39	31	200
Grant Holmes	10	6	3.44	31	29	0	151.2	136	60	58	62	115
Bryce Elder	8	8	4.11	26	26	0	149.0	140	74	68	49	121
Martín Pérez	9	9	3.04	30	26	0	142.0	119	53	48	62	102
Reynaldo López	4	5	4.54	26	13	0	79.1	80	44	40	34	73
Didier Fuentes	7	2	2.45	58	1	3	73.1	60	21	20	21	92
JR Ritchie	1	5	4.91	17	11	1	73.1	65	43	40	43	68
Dylan Lee	6	1	3.09	71	0	0	67.0	48	25	23	17	77
Raisel Iglesias	1	2	2.55	59	0	34	60.0	48	21	17	17	64
Tyler Mahle	4	1	1.99	9	9	0	54.1	43	14	12	9	48
Dylan Dodd	4	1	2.54	48	0	2	49.2	31	14	14	14	53
Tyler Kinley	6	5	4.01	49	0	1	42.2	35	21	19	20	42
Spencer Strider	4	2	5.31	8	8	0	39.0	33	24	23	20	46
Victor Mederos	6	1	3.41	30	0	1	34.1	27	13	13	14	34
Robert Suárez	4	0	1.06	33	0	4	34.0	24	4	4	6	26
AJ Smith-Shawver	0	3	6.61	9	5	0	31.1	32	23	23	16	27
Brent Suter	2	0	1.63	13	1	0	27.2	23	7	5	8	23
Ray Kerr	0	0	1.47	9	1	0	18.1	9	3	3	2	11
Carlos Carrasco	0	0	5.94	8	0	0	16.2	21	11	11	3	7
José Suárez	0	1	6.61	8	1	1	16.1	22	12	12	12	21
Aaron Bummer	1	1	7.63	19	0	0	15.1	18	15	13	10	13
Danny Young	0	1	8.03	16	1	0	12.1	15	11	11	13	15
Elieser Hernández	2	0	2.25	5	0	1	12.0	10	3	3	6	13
Owen Murphy	0	1	6.00	5	1	0	12.0	17	10	8	3	9
Hurston Waldrep	0	1	8.44	3	2	0	10.2	13	10	10	10	9
Osvaldo Bido	1	0	6.30	6	0	1	10.0	7	7	7	5	6
James Karinchak	0	0	1.86	9	0	0	9.2	4	2	2	5	8
Joel Payamps	0	2	8.22	12	0	0	7.2	9	9	7	4	9
Connor Thomas	0	1	21.32	2	0	0	6.1	15	15	15	6	4
Anthony Molina	0	0	5.40	3	0	0	5.0	6	4	3	1	2
Ian Hamilton	0	0	7.71	4	0	0	4.2	6	4	4	3	4
Bailey Falter	0	0	0.00	2	0	0	3.1	2	0	0	0	2
Jorge Mateo	0	0	3.86	3	0	0	2.1	5	1	1	1	1
Rolddy Muñoz	0	0	13.50	1	0	0	2.0	5	3	3	1	3
Hunter Stratton	0	0	0.00	1	0	0	1.0	1	0	0	0	1
Blake Burkhalter	0	0	9.00	1	0	0	1.0	1	1	1	1	1
Totals	94	68	3.63	162	162	49	1438.0	1259	626	580	529	1350

== Farm system ==
Level	Team	League	Manager
AAA	Gwinnett Stripers	International League	Kanekoa Texeira
AA	Columbus Clingstones	Southern League	Nestor Perez
High-A	Rome Emperors	South Atlantic League	Wynston Sawyer
A	Augusta GreenJackets	Carolina League	Brad Stoll
Rookie	FCL Braves	Florida Complex League	Cody Gabella
Rookie	DSL Braves	Dominican Summer League	Maikol Gonzalez
