= 2027 Atlanta Braves season =

2027 Atlanta Braves
- League: National League
- Division: East
- Ballpark: Truist Park
- City: Cumberland
- General managers: Alex Anthopoulos
- Managers: Walt Weiss
- Television: BravesVision
- Radio: 680 The Fan; Atlanta Braves Radio Network; 1600 La Mejor

The 2027 Atlanta Braves season is scheduled to be the 157th season of the Atlanta Braves franchise, the 62nd in Atlanta, and the Braves' 11th season at Truist Park. The Braves will be managed by Walt Weiss, in his second season as the team's manager. The Braves would attempt to improve on their 94–68 record from the previous season and repeat as NL East champions.

The season is contingent on Major League Baseball (MLB) and the Major League Baseball Players Association (MLBPA) signing a new collective bargaining agreement (CBA). Without a new CBA, MLB is expected to lock out the players on December 2, 2026, until one is signed. If such a lockout extends indefinitely, the season could be postponed, shortened, or even cancelled.

== Game log ==
The 2027 schedule is tentative until a new collective bargaining agreement (CBA) is signed between Major League Baseball (MLB) and the Major League Baseball Players Association (MLBPA). If the labor dispute extends into late February or early March, MLB would then start to consider whether to postpone or shorten the season.

=== Regular season ===
Legend
| | Braves win |
| | Braves loss |
| | Postponement |
| **Bold** | Braves team member |

2027 Game Log: 0–0 (Home: 0–0; Road: 0–0)
March/April: 0–0 (Home: 0–0; Road: 0–0)

| # | Date | Opponent | Score | Win | Loss | Save | Attendance | Record | Streak |
|---|---|---|---|---|---|---|---|---|---|
| 1 | March 25 | @ Dodgers | — | — | — | — | — | 0–0 | — |
| 2 | March 27 | @ Dodgers | — | — | — | — | — | 0–0 | — |
| 3 | March 28 | @ Dodgers | — | — | — | — | — | 0–0 | — |
| 4 | March 29 | @ Brewers | — | — | — | — | — | 0–0 | — |
| 5 | March 30 | @ Brewers | — | — | — | — | — | 0–0 | — |
| 6 | March 31 | @ Brewers | — | — | — | — | — | 0–0 | — |
| 7 | April 2 | Astros | — | — | — | — | — | 0–0 | — |
| 8 | April 3 | Astros | — | — | — | — | — | 0–0 | — |
| 9 | April 4 | Astros | — | — | — | — | — | 0–0 | — |
| 10 | April 5 | Giants | — | — | — | — | — | 0–0 | — |
| 11 | April 6 | Giants | — | — | — | — | — | 0–0 | — |
| 12 | April 7 | Giants | — | — | — | — | — | 0–0 | — |
| 13 | April 8 | Giants | — | — | — | — | — | 0–0 | — |
| 14 | April 9 | @ Marlins | — | — | — | — | — | 0–0 | — |
| 15 | April 10 | @ Marlins | — | — | — | — | — | 0–0 | — |
| 16 | April 11 | @ Marlins | — | — | — | — | — | 0–0 | — |
| 17 | April 13 | @ Nationals | — | — | — | — | — | 0–0 | — |
| 18 | April 14 | @ Nationals | — | — | — | — | — | 0–0 | — |
| 19 | April 15 | @ Nationals | — | — | — | — | — | 0–0 | — |
| 20 | April 16 | Marlins | — | — | — | — | — | 0–0 | — |
| 21 | April 17 | Marlins | — | — | — | — | — | 0–0 | — |
| 22 | April 18 | Marlins | — | — | — | — | — | 0–0 | — |
| 23 | April 20 | Nationals | — | — | — | — | — | 0–0 | — |
| 24 | April 21 | Nationals | — | — | — | — | — | 0–0 | — |
| 25 | April 22 | Nationals | — | — | — | — | — | 0–0 | — |
| 26 | April 23 | @ Rays | — | — | — | — | — | 0–0 | — |
| 27 | April 24 | @ Rays | — | — | — | — | — | 0–0 | — |
| 28 | April 25 | @ Rays | — | — | — | — | — | 0–0 | — |
| 29 | April 26 | @ Cardinals | — | — | — | — | — | 0–0 | — |
| 30 | April 27 | @ Cardinals | — | — | — | — | — | 0–0 | — |
| 31 | April 28 | @ Cardinals | — | — | — | — | — | 0–0 | — |
| 32 | April 29 | Mets | — | — | — | — | — | 0–0 | — |
| 33 | April 30 | Mets | — | — | — | — | — | 0–0 | — |

May: 0–0 (Home: 0–0; Road: 0–0)

| # | Date | Opponent | Score | Win | Loss | Save | Attendance | Record | Streak |
|---|---|---|---|---|---|---|---|---|---|
| 34 | May 1 | Mets | — | — | — | — | — | 0–0 | — |
| 35 | May 2 | Mets | — | — | — | — | — | 0–0 | — |
| 36 | May 4 | Padres | — | — | — | — | — | 0–0 | — |
| 37 | May 5 | Padres | — | — | — | — | — | 0–0 | — |
| 38 | May 6 | Padres | — | — | — | — | — | 0–0 | — |
| 39 | May 7 | @ Phillies | — | — | — | — | — | 0–0 | — |
| 40 | May 8 | @ Phillies | — | — | — | — | — | 0–0 | — |
| 41 | May 9 | @ Phillies | — | — | — | — | — | 0–0 | — |
| 42 | May 11 | @ Tigers | — | — | — | — | — | 0–0 | — |
| 43 | May 12 | @ Tigers | — | — | — | — | — | 0–0 | — |
| 44 | May 13 | @ Tigers | — | — | — | — | — | 0–0 | — |
| 45 | May 14 | Diamondbacks | — | — | — | — | — | 0–0 | — |
| 46 | May 15 | Diamondbacks | — | — | — | — | — | 0–0 | — |
| 47 | May 16 | Diamondbacks | — | — | — | — | — | 0–0 | — |
| 48 | May 18 | Red Sox | — | — | — | — | — | 0–0 | — |
| 49 | May 19 | Red Sox | — | — | — | — | — | 0–0 | — |
| 50 | May 20 | Red Sox | — | — | — | — | — | 0–0 | — |
| 51 | May 21 | @ Royals | — | — | — | — | — | 0–0 | — |
| 52 | May 22 | @ Royals | — | — | — | — | — | 0–0 | — |
| 53 | May 23 | @ Royals | — | — | — | — | — | 0–0 | — |
| 54 | May 24 | @ Mets | — | — | — | — | — | 0–0 | — |
| 55 | May 25 | @ Mets | — | — | — | — | — | 0–0 | — |
| 56 | May 26 | @ Mets | — | — | — | — | — | 0–0 | — |
| 57 | May 28 | Pirates | — | — | — | — | — | 0–0 | — |
| 58 | May 29 | Pirates | — | — | — | — | — | 0–0 | — |
| 59 | May 30 | Pirates | — | — | — | — | — | 0–0 | — |
| 60 | May 31 | Rockies | — | — | — | — | — | 0–0 | — |

June: 0–0 (Home: 0–0; Road: 0–0)

| # | Date | Opponent | Score | Win | Loss | Save | Attendance | Record | Streak |
|---|---|---|---|---|---|---|---|---|---|
| 61 | June 1 | Rockies | — | — | — | — | — | 0–0 | — |
| 62 | June 2 | Rockies | — | — | — | — | — | 0–0 | — |
| 63 | June 4 | Twins | — | — | — | — | — | 0–0 | — |
| 64 | June 5 | Twins | — | — | — | — | — | 0–0 | — |
| 65 | June 6 | Twins | — | — | — | — | — | 0–0 | — |
| 66 | June 7 | @ Rockies | — | — | — | — | — | 0–0 | — |
| 67 | June 8 | @ Rockies | — | — | — | — | — | 0–0 | — |
| 68 | June 9 | @ Rockies | — | — | — | — | — | 0–0 | — |
| 69 | June 11 | @ Athletics | — | — | — | — | — | 0–0 | — |
| 70 | June 12 | @ Athletics | — | — | — | — | — | 0–0 | — |
| 71 | June 13 | @ Athletics | — | — | — | — | — | 0–0 | — |
| 72 | June 14 | @ Diamondbacks | — | — | — | — | — | 0–0 | — |
| 73 | June 15 | @ Diamondbacks | — | — | — | — | — | 0–0 | — |
| 74 | June 16 | @ Diamondbacks | — | — | — | — | — | 0–0 | — |
| 75 | June 18 | Yankees | — | — | — | — | — | 0–0 | — |
| 76 | June 19 | Yankees | — | — | — | — | — | 0–0 | — |
| 77 | June 20 | Yankees | — | — | — | — | — | 0–0 | — |
| 78 | June 21 | Phillies | — | — | — | — | — | 0–0 | — |
| 79 | June 22 | Phillies | — | — | — | — | — | 0–0 | — |
| 80 | June 23 | Phillies | — | — | — | — | — | 0–0 | — |
| 81 | June 24 | Phillies | — | — | — | — | — | 0–0 | — |
| 82 | June 25 | @ Reds | — | — | — | — | — | 0–0 | — |
| 83 | June 26 | @ Reds | — | — | — | — | — | 0–0 | — |
| 84 | June 27 | @ Reds | — | — | — | — | — | 0–0 | — |
| 85 | June 28 | @ Rangers | — | — | — | — | — | 0–0 | — |
| 86 | June 29 | @ Rangers | — | — | — | — | — | 0–0 | — |
| 87 | June 30 | @ Rangers | — | — | — | — | — | 0–0 | — |

July: 0–0 (Home: 0–0; Road: 0–0)

| # | Date | Opponent | Score | Win | Loss | Save | Attendance | Record | Streak |
|---|---|---|---|---|---|---|---|---|---|
| 88 | July 2 | Angels | — | — | — | — | — | 0–0 | — |
| 89 | July 3 | Angels | — | — | — | — | — | 0–0 | — |
| 90 | July 4 | Angels | — | — | — | — | — | 0–0 | — |
| 91 | July 6 | Cubs | — | — | — | — | — | 0–0 | — |
| 92 | July 7 | Cubs | — | — | — | — | — | 0–0 | — |
| 93 | July 8 | Cubs | — | — | — | — | — | 0–0 | — |
| 94 | July 9 | Reds | — | — | — | — | — | 0–0 | — |
| 95 | July 10 | Reds | — | — | — | — | — | 0–0 | — |
| 96 | July 11 | Reds | — | — | — | — | — | 0–0 | — |
| – | July 13 | **97th All-Star Game: Chicago, IL** | | | | | | | |
| 97 | July 16 | @ Red Sox | — | — | — | — | — | 0–0 | — |
| 98 | July 17 | @ Red Sox | — | — | — | — | — | 0–0 | — |
| 99 | July 18 | @ Red Sox | — | — | — | — | — | 0–0 | — |
| 100 | July 19 | Phillies | — | — | — | — | — | 0–0 | — |
| 101 | July 20 | Phillies | — | — | — | — | — | 0–0 | — |
| 102 | July 21 | Phillies | — | — | — | — | — | 0–0 | — |
| 103 | July 22 | @ Nationals | — | — | — | — | — | 0–0 | — |
| 104 | July 23 | @ Nationals | — | — | — | — | — | 0–0 | — |
| 105 | July 24 | @ Nationals | — | — | — | — | — | 0–0 | — |
| 106 | July 25 | @ Nationals | — | — | — | — | — | 0–0 | — |
| 107 | July 26 | @ Pirates | — | — | — | — | — | 0–0 | — |
| 108 | July 27 | @ Pirates | — | — | — | — | — | 0–0 | — |
| 109 | July 28 | @ Pirates | — | — | — | — | — | 0–0 | — |
| 110 | July 29 | @ Pirates | — | — | — | — | — | 0–0 | — |
| 111 | July 30 | Cardinals | — | — | — | — | — | 0–0 | — |
| 112 | July 31 | Cardinals | — | — | — | — | — | 0–0 | — |

August: 0–0 (Home: 0–0; Road: 0–0)

| # | Date | Opponent | Score | Win | Loss | Save | Attendance | Record | Streak |
|---|---|---|---|---|---|---|---|---|---|
| 113 | August 1 | Cardinals | — | — | — | — | — | 0–0 | — |
| 114 | August 3 | Mariners | — | — | — | — | — | 0–0 | — |
| 115 | August 4 | Mariners | — | — | — | — | — | 0–0 | — |
| 116 | August 5 | Mariners | — | — | — | — | — | 0–0 | — |
| 117 | August 6 | @ Blue Jays | — | — | — | — | — | 0–0 | — |
| 118 | August 7 | @ Blue Jays | — | — | — | — | — | 0–0 | — |
| 119 | August 8 | @ Blue Jays | — | — | — | — | — | 0–0 | — |
| 120 | August 9 | @ Mets | — | — | — | — | — | 0–0 | — |
| 121 | August 10 | @ Mets | — | — | — | — | — | 0–0 | — |
| 122 | August 11 | @ Mets | — | — | — | — | — | 0–0 | — |
| 123 | August 13 | Orioles | — | — | — | — | — | 0–0 | — |
| 124 | August 14 | Orioles | — | — | — | — | — | 0–0 | — |
| 125 | August 15 | Orioles | — | — | — | — | — | 0–0 | — |
| 126 | August 16 | @ Marlins | — | — | — | — | — | 0–0 | — |
| 127 | August 17 | @ Marlins | — | — | — | — | — | 0–0 | — |
| 128 | August 18 | @ Marlins | — | — | — | — | — | 0–0 | — |
| 129 | August 19 | @ Marlins | — | — | — | — | — | 0–0 | — |
| 130 | August 20 | Mets | — | — | — | — | — | 0–0 | — |
| 131 | August 21 | Mets | — | — | — | — | — | 0–0 | — |
| 132 | August 22 | Mets | — | — | — | — | — | 0–0 | — |
| 133 | August 23 | Brewers | — | — | — | — | — | 0–0 | — |
| 134 | August 24 | Brewers | — | — | — | — | — | 0–0 | — |
| 135 | August 25 | Brewers | — | — | — | — | — | 0–0 | — |
| 136 | August 27 | @ Cubs | — | — | — | — | — | 0–0 | — |
| 137 | August 28 | @ Cubs | — | — | — | — | — | 0–0 | — |
| 138 | August 29 | @ Cubs | — | — | — | — | — | 0–0 | — |
| 139 | August 31 | @ Phillies | — | — | — | — | — | 0–0 | — |

September: 0–0 (Home: 0–0; Road: 0–0)

| # | Date | Opponent | Score | Win | Loss | Save | Attendance | Record | Streak |
|---|---|---|---|---|---|---|---|---|---|
| 140 | September 1 | @ Phillies | — | — | — | — | — | 0–0 | — |
| 141 | September 2 | @ Phillies | — | — | — | — | — | 0–0 | — |
| 142 | September 3 | @ Guardians | — | — | — | — | — | 0–0 | — |
| 143 | September 4 | @ Guardians | — | — | — | — | — | 0–0 | — |
| 144 | September 5 | @ Guardians | — | — | — | — | — | 0–0 | — |
| 145 | September 6 | Dodgers | — | — | — | — | — | 0–0 | — |
| 146 | September 7 | Dodgers | — | — | — | — | — | 0–0 | — |
| 147 | September 8 | Dodgers | — | — | — | — | — | 0–0 | — |
| 148 | September 10 | White Sox | — | — | — | — | — | 0–0 | — |
| 149 | September 11 | White Sox | — | — | — | — | — | 0–0 | — |
| 150 | September 12 | White Sox | — | — | — | — | — | 0–0 | — |
| 151 | September 14 | @ Padres | — | — | — | — | — | 0–0 | — |
| 152 | September 15 | @ Padres | — | — | — | — | — | 0–0 | — |
| 153 | September 16 | @ Padres | — | — | — | — | — | 0–0 | — |
| 154 | September 17 | @ Giants | — | — | — | — | — | 0–0 | — |
| 155 | September 18 | @ Giants | — | — | — | — | — | 0–0 | — |
| 156 | September 19 | @ Giants | — | — | — | — | — | 0–0 | — |
| 157 | September 21 | Nationals | — | — | — | — | — | 0–0 | — |
| 158 | September 22 | Nationals | — | — | — | — | — | 0–0 | — |
| 159 | September 23 | Nationals | — | — | — | — | — | 0–0 | — |
| 160 | September 24 | Marlins | — | — | — | — | — | 0–0 | — |
| 161 | September 25 | Marlins | — | — | — | — | — | 0–0 | — |
| 162 | September 26 | Marlins | — | — | — | — | — | 0–0 | — |

== Roster ==
Atlanta Braves 2027 spring training roster
| 40-man roster | | Non-roster invitees | Coaches / other |
|---|---|---|---|
| Pitchers: 76 Blake Burkhalter; -- Cédric De Grandpré; 46 Dylan Dodd; 55 Bryce Elder; -- Cameron Foster; 72 Didier Fuentes; 66 Grant Holmes; 62 Ray Kerr; 52 Dylan Lee; 40 Reynaldo López; 58 Víctor Mederos; 67 Rolddy Muñoz; 73 Owen Murphy; -- Mitchell Parker; -- Evan Phillips; -- Davis Polo; 60 JR Ritchie; 51 Chris Sale; 56 Spencer Schwellenbach; 32 AJ Smith-Shawver; 75 Robert Suárez; -- Tyler Uberstine; 64 Hurston Waldrep; 33 Joey Wentz; -- Danny Young | Catchers: 30 Drake Baldwin; 12 Sean Murphy; Infielders: 1 Ozzie Albies; 74 Jim Jarvis; 28 Matt Olson; 27 Austin Riley; -- Brett Wisely; Outfielders: 13 Ronald Acuña Jr.; 23 Michael Harris II; 53 Brewer Hicklen; 18 Mike Yastrzemski | Infielders: -- Vidal Bruján; -- Tyler Freeman | Manager: 22 Walt Weiss; Coaches: 88 Darnell Coles (assistant hitting); 83 Tony Diaz (assistant); 81 Dustin Garneau (catching); 85 Jeremy Hefner (pitching); 80 Tim Hyers (hitting); 10 Chipper Jones (hitting consultant); 89 Tony Mansolino (bench); 87 J.P. Martinez (bullpen); 98 Wigberto Nevarez (bullpen catcher); 95 Eddie Pérez (assistant); 86 Antoan Richardson (first base); 84 Tommy Watkins (third base); 96 José Yepez (bullpen catcher); 60-day injured list: 99 Spencer Strider; Restricted list: 17 Jurickson Profar; 36 active, 0 inactive, 2 non-roster invitees; 7-, 10-, or 15-day injured list; * Not on active roster; ^{†} Suspended list; Roster, coaches, and NRIs updated November 20, 2026; Transactions • Depth chart; → All MLB rosters |

== Farm system ==
| Level | Team | League | Manager |
|---|---|---|---|
| AAA | Gwinnett Stripers | International League | |
| AA | Columbus Clingstones | Southern League | |
| High-A | Rome Emperors | South Atlantic League | |
| A | Augusta GreenJackets | Carolina League | |
| Rookie | FCL Braves | Florida Complex League | |
| Rookie | DSL Braves | Dominican Summer League | |
