= DaShawn Keirsey Jr. =

American baseball player (born 1997)

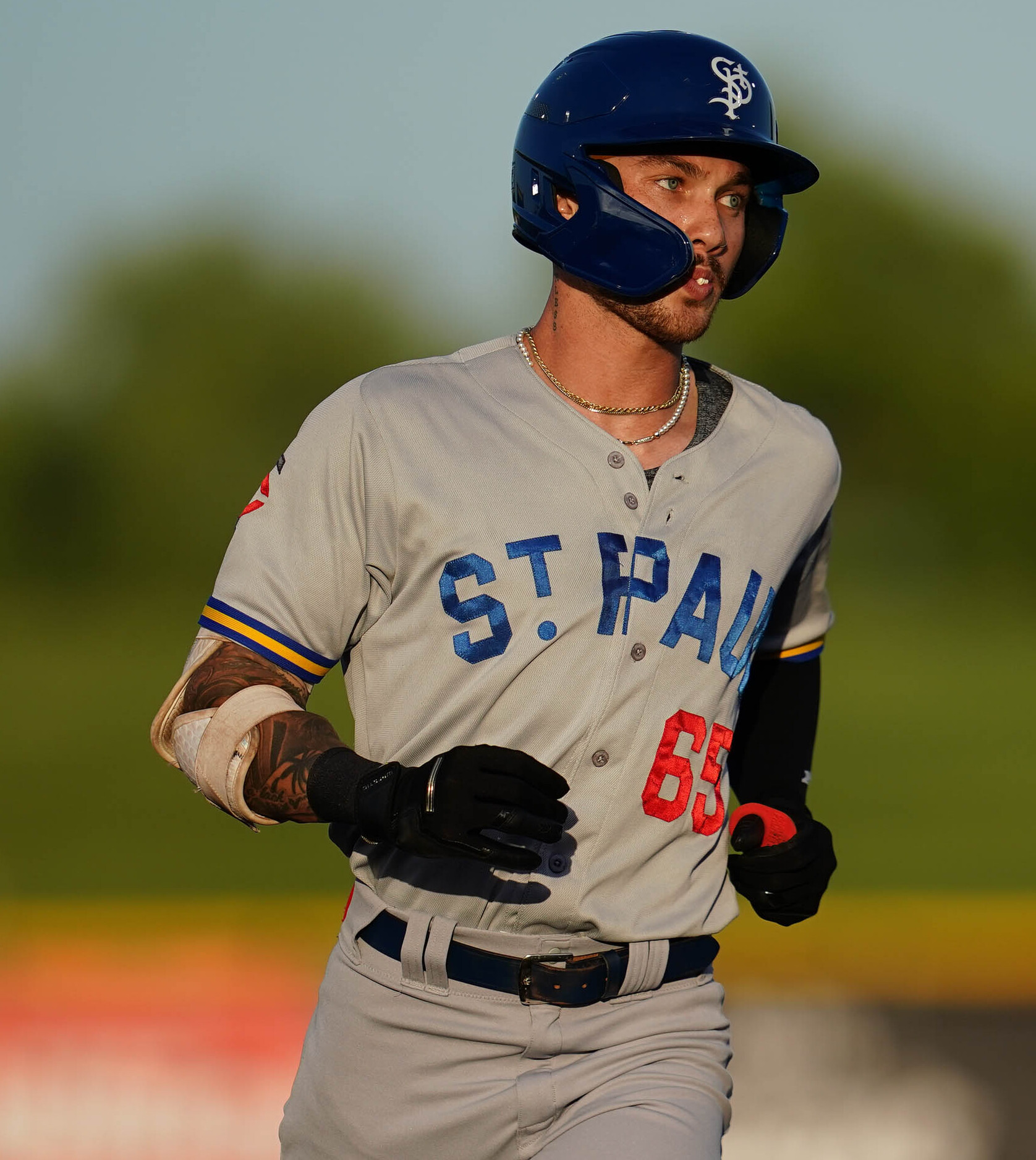
- Keirsey with the St. Paul Saints in 2023

Free agent
- Outfielder
- Born: May 13, 1997 (age 29); San Diego, California, U.S.
- Bats: Left Throws: Left

MLB debut
- September 5, 2024, for the Minnesota Twins

MLB statistics (through 2026 season)
- Batting average: .118
- Home runs: 3
- Runs batted in: 10
- Stats at Baseball Reference

Teams
- Minnesota Twins (2024–2025); Atlanta Braves (2026)

DaShawn Robert Keirsey Jr. (born May 13, 1997) is an American professional baseball outfielder who is a free agent. He has previously played in Major League Baseball (MLB) for the Minnesota Twins.

== Amateur career ==
Keirsey attended Helix High School in La Mesa, California and played college baseball at the University of Utah for the Utes. As a junior in 2018, he hit .386 with four home runs, 22 RBI, and 23 doubles over 50 games.

== Professional career ==
=== Minnesota Twins ===
Keirsey was selected by the Minnesota Twins in the fourth round with the 124th overall selection of the 2018 Major League Baseball draft. Keirsey made his professional debut with the rookie–level Elizabethton Twins. He split 2019 between Elizabethton and the Single–A Cedar Rapids Kernels, slashing .150/.266/.170 with no home runs, 14 RBI, and three stolen bases across 173 plate appearances in 43 games for the two affiliates. He did not play in a game in 2020 due to the cancellation of the minor league season because of the COVID-19 pandemic.

Keirsey returned to action in 2021 with Cedar Rapids and the rookie–level Florida Complex League Twins. In 177 plate appearances over 48 games, he batted .211/.305/.428 with seven home runs, 24 RBI, and 11 stolen bases. Keirsey spent the 2022 campaign with the Double–A Wichita Wind Surge, hitting .271/.329/.395 with seven home runs, 48 RBI, and 42 stolen bases across 121 games. In 2023, Keirsey split the year between Wichita and the Triple–A St. Paul Saints. In 130 total games, he slashed .294/.366/.455 with career–highs in home runs (15) and RBI (61), as well as 39 stolen bases.

Keirsey began the 2024 season with St. Paul, batting .292/.363/.477 with 14 home runs, 75 RBI, and 36 stolen bases over 103 games. On September 5, 2024, Keirsey was selected to the 40-man roster and promoted to the major leagues for the first time, where he batted 2-for-14 (.154). He became the 21st Ute to debut in the majors.

Keirsey delivered a walk-off single against the San Francisco Giants on May 11, 2025. In 74 appearances for Minnesota, he batted .107/.138/.179 with two home runs, six RBI, and 10 stolen bases. Keirsey was designated for assignment by the Twins following the acquisition of Alex Jackson on November 21. He was non-tendered by Minnesota the same day and became a free agent.

=== Atlanta Braves ===
On December 18, 2025, Keirsey signed a minor league contract with the Atlanta Braves. On June 4, 2026, the Braves added Keirsey to their 40-man roster and subsequently optioned him to the Triple-A Gwinnett Stripers. On September 11, he was recalled to the major league roster. On October 15, he was sent outright to Triple-A Gwinnett Stripers. He elected free agency on November 2.
