= Walt Weiss =

American baseball player & coach (born 1963)

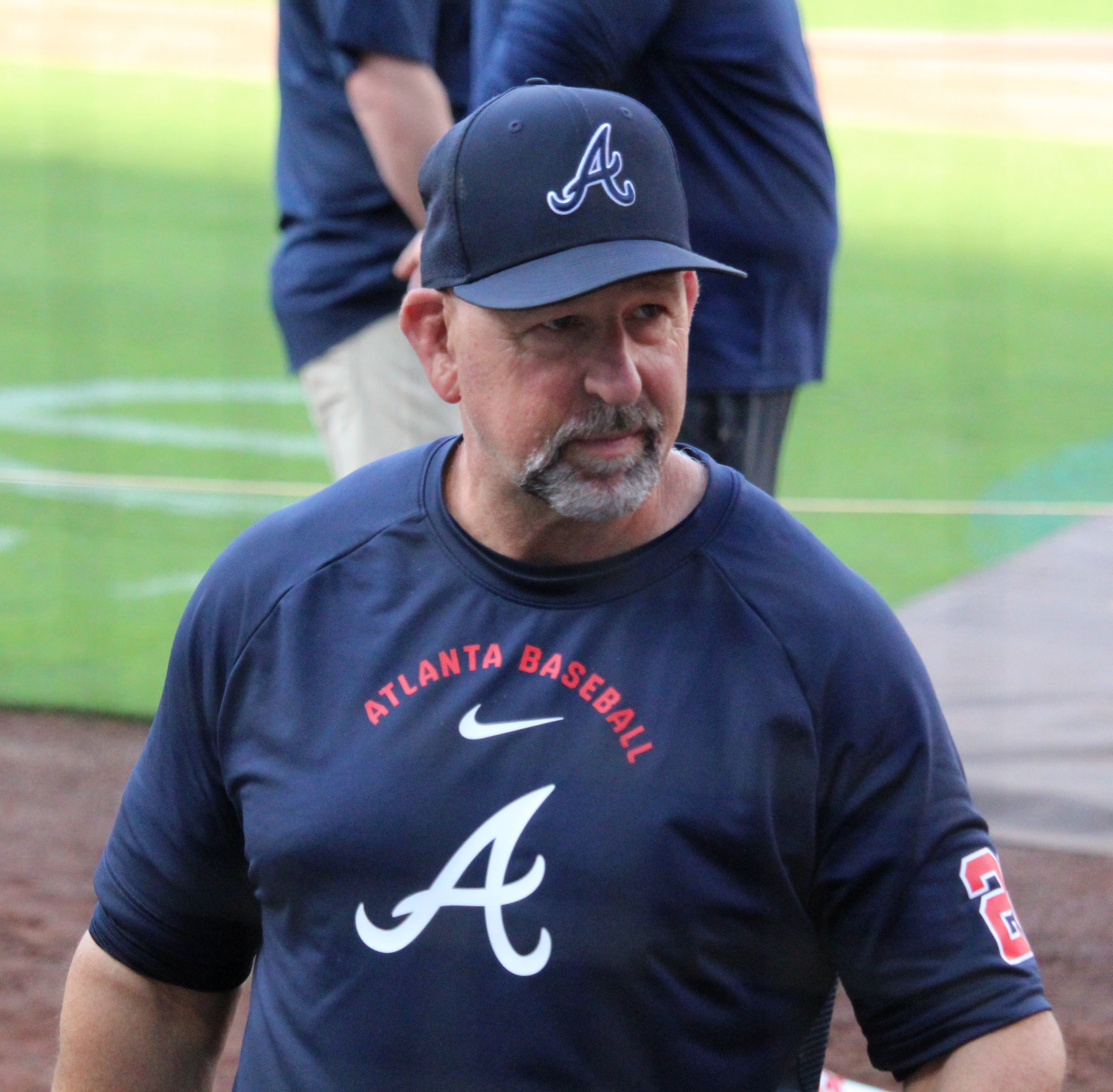
- Weiss as manager of the Atlanta Braves in 2026

Atlanta Braves – No. 22
- Shortstop / Manager
- Born: November 28, 1963 (age 62); Tuxedo, New York, U.S.
- Batted: Switch Threw: Right

MLB debut
- July 12, 1987, for the Oakland Athletics

Last MLB appearance
- October 1, 2000, for the Atlanta Braves

MLB statistics (through August 8, 2026)
- Batting average: .258
- Home runs: 25
- Runs batted in: 386
- Managerial record: 353–412
- Winning %: .461
- Stats at Baseball Reference
- Managerial record at Baseball Reference

Teams
- As player: Oakland Athletics (1987–1992); Florida Marlins (1993); Colorado Rockies (1994–1997); Atlanta Braves (1998–2000); As manager: Colorado Rockies (2013–2016); Atlanta Braves (2026–present); As coach: Atlanta Braves (2018–2025)

Career highlights and awards
- All-Star (1998); 2× World Series champion (1989, 2021); AL Rookie of the Year (1988)

Walter William Weiss (born November 28, 1963) is an American former professional baseball shortstop and current manager for the Atlanta Braves of Major League Baseball (MLB). He played in MLB from 1987 through 2000 for the Oakland Athletics, Florida Marlins, Colorado Rockies, and Braves. He managed the Rockies from 2013 through 2016. Weiss won the 1988 Rookie of the Year award. He was also a member of the 1998 National League All-Star Team.

== Playing career ==
=== Early career ===
Initially drafted by the Baltimore Orioles in the 10th round of the 1982 amateur draft, Weiss decided to put his professional baseball career on hold and attended the University of North Carolina at Chapel Hill. In 1984, he played collegiate summer baseball with the Wareham Gatemen of the Cape Cod Baseball League where he was named a league all-star and set a league record for most doubles in a season. In June 1985, he was the 12th overall pick in the 1985 draft.

At the age of 23, he made his major league debut for the Oakland Athletics in September 1987. The club was impressed enough with the young shortstop's talent that they traded starter Alfredo Griffin that December, making him their starting shortstop for 1988. His offensive numbers were low (.250 average, three home runs, 39 RBIs and 44 runs scored), but his defensive wizardry helped lead the A's to their first American League pennant since 1974. The 1988 World Series was a rematch of the 1974 matchup, with the Los Angeles Dodgers winning the National League pennant. His costly error in Game 4 helped the Dodgers win the Series in five games, but he was voted American League Rookie of the Year for 1988 as the third consecutive Oakland player to win the award after sluggers José Canseco in 1986 and Mark McGwire in 1987. He also made the 1988 Topps All-Star Rookie Roster.

=== Mid-career ===
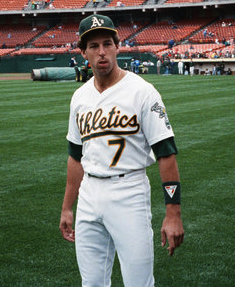
Weiss with the A's in 1989

In 1989 the A's repeated as AL pennant winners, meeting their crosstown rival San Francisco Giants in the 1989 World Series. Although the Series would be overshadowed by the Loma Prieta earthquake on October 17 which delayed play for ten days, Weiss homered and the A's swept the Giants to claim their first world title in fifteen years.

1990 saw Weiss put up his best offensive numbers to date in hits, runs and batting average, while also stealing nine bases. The A's won their third straight pennant, but Weiss was injured in the 1990 American League Championship Series against the Boston Red Sox and missed Oakland's 1990 World Series loss to the Cincinnati Reds, four games to none. Limited by prior injuries, he didn't play much in 1991 as the A's missed the playoffs for the first time since 1987. In what would be his final year in Oakland, he hit .212 in 1992 and was traded to the new NL expansion Florida Marlins for Eric Helfand and a player to be named later during the offseason.

He played in 158 games in 1993 for the Marlins, but after the season became a free agent, chose to sign with the Colorado Rockies (which, like the Marlins, was also a new NL expansion team in 1993) becoming the first player to appear for both of these 1993 expansion teams. Weiss spent four years in Colorado, posting career highs in home runs (8) and RBIs (48).

=== Later career ===
In December 1997, he signed with the Atlanta Braves. As the team's starting shortstop, Weiss hit .280 and made the All-Star team in 1998, the only time in his career he did so. The Braves finished with 106 wins but lost the NL pennant to the San Diego Padres, although he was slowed by injuries and appeared in less than a hundred games for the first time since 1991. The next season, his decline continued with a disappointing .226 batting average.

While with the Braves, Weiss's family had a health scare when his 3-year old son contracted E. Coli from an Atlanta water amusement park which caused his kidneys to shut down. Weiss's son made a full recovery.

In Game 3 of the 1999 NLDS against the Houston Astros, however, he made a stunning defensive play to save the season. In the bottom of the tenth, with the bases loaded, one out and the score tied, Tony Eusebio hit a sharp grounder up the middle. Weiss ranged hard to his left, fell on his stomach and threw to home for the force. After the game, he said the ball nearly ripped the glove off his hand. Weiss and the Braves went on to win the game, and with it the division series, on their way to the NL pennant and the 1999 World Series, which they lost to the New York Yankees.

In 2000, he only had 192 at-bats, mostly due to losing the starting shortstop job to the emergent Rafael Furcal, who would go on to win Rookie of the Year just like Weiss twelve years prior. He retired after that season.

== Player profile ==
Weiss was an above-average fielder throughout his career, known not only for his defense but the specific item of equipment he used defensively. Weiss used one glove for twelve seasons, nearly the entirety of his major league career. Weiss's teammate Mike Bordick named Weiss's glove "The Creature" for its decrepit condition, unattractive appearance, and objectionable odor. The glove's condition became a factor in the 1999 World Series when a Chipper Jones warmup throw before Game 3 destroyed its pocket. The glove had to be reassembled using fishing line instead of leather strings to enable its use through the rest of the series, after which it was retired.

== Post-playing career ==
Weiss's charitable contributions have included numerous donations to Watertown High School in Watertown, New York. The baseball field at his alma mater, Suffern High School, has been named after him since April 13, 1999.

After retiring from the Braves as a player, following the 2000 season, Weiss decided against signing with the St. Louis Cardinals as a player in 2001, or joining Rockies manager Clint Hurdle's staff as an assistant coach for the 2002 season. Instead, he returned to the Rockies as a special instructor and adviser to the front office from 2002 through 2008. He left that job to spend more time with his family, and coach his sons' baseball and football teams at Regis Jesuit High School.

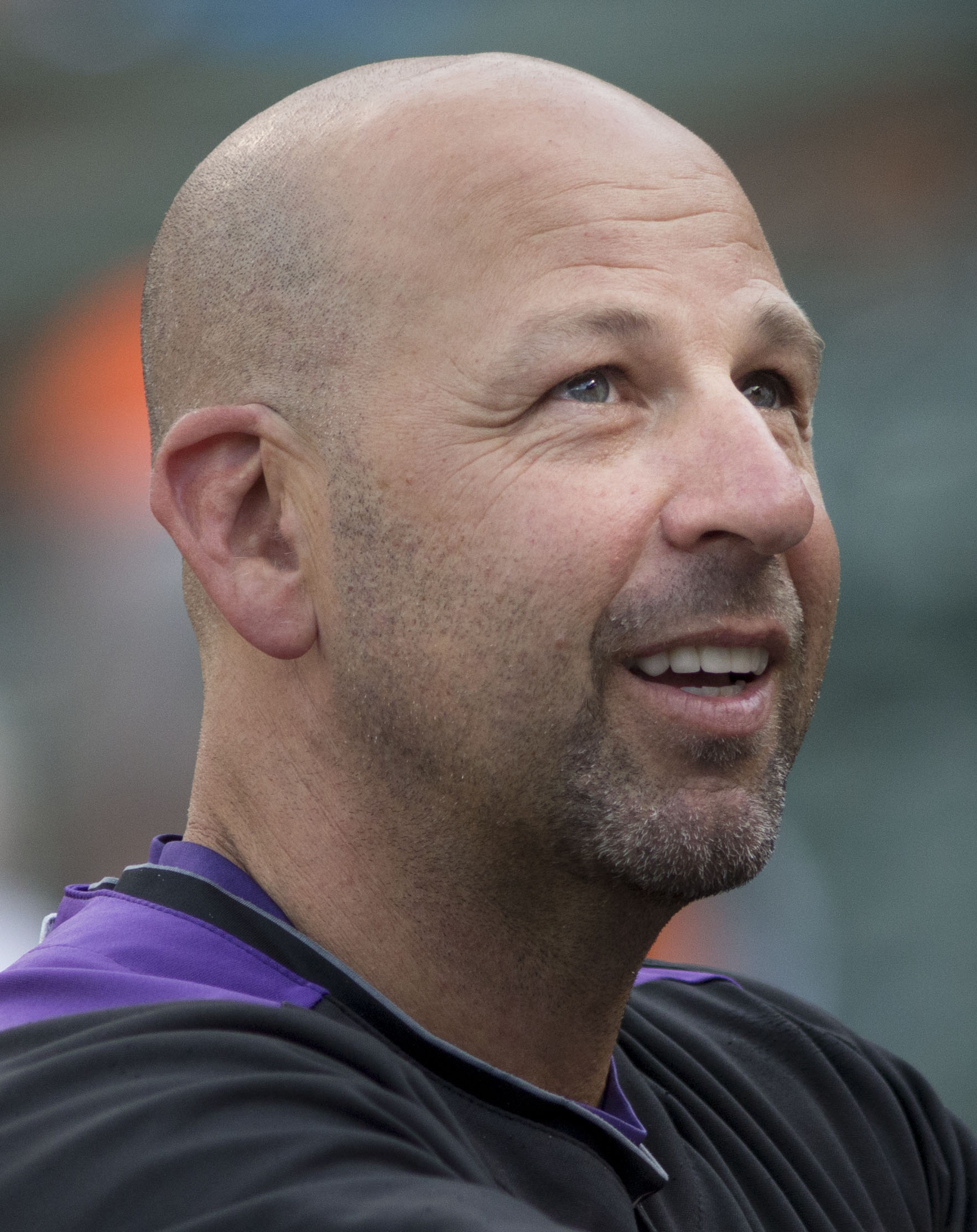
Weiss as manager of the Colorado Rockies in 2013

Weiss was signed on November 7, 2012, to be the manager of the Colorado Rockies. Weiss made the decision to step down as the manager of the Colorado Rockies after four managerial seasons with the club on October 3, 2016. He finished with a record of 283 wins and 365 losses.

The Braves announced Weiss had been hired as bench coach on November 10, 2017. Weiss, while serving a bench coach for the Atlanta Braves, won a World Series Championship in 2021 after defeating the Houston Astros (4 games to 2) on November 2, 2021.

On October 21, 2022, Weiss was offered an interview for the Miami Marlins vacant managerial position, but turned down the opportunity.

On November 3, 2025, the Atlanta Braves named Weiss as their new manager. During a bench-clearing brawl in a game in Anaheim on April 7, 2026, Weiss tackled Jorge Soler of the Los Angeles Angels after Soler charged the mound to confront Braves pitcher Reynaldo López. Weiss said after the game that he had to get Soler "off his feet" because he was "gonna hurt somebody." Weiss led the Braves to a NL East title in his first season. Weiss finished second in voting for the Manager of the Year Award to three-time winner Pat Murphy.

== Managerial record ==
As of games played on October 7, 2026

Team	Year	Regular season					Postseason			
Team	Year	Games	Won	Lost	Win %	Finish	Won	Lost	Win %	Result
COL	2013	162	74	88	.457	5th in NL West	–	–	–	
COL	2014	162	66	96	.407	4th in NL West	–	–	–	
COL	2015	162	68	94	.420	5th in NL West	–	–	–	
COL	2016	162	75	87	.463	3rd in NL West	–	–	–	
COL total		648	283	365	.437		-	-	-	
ATL	2026	162	94	68	.580	1st in NL East	3	4	.429	Lost NLDS (LAD)
ATL total		162	94	68	.580		3	4	.429	
Total		810	377	433	.465		3	4	.429	

== Personal life ==
Weiss is married to Terri, with whom he raised four children. Weiss is a black belt in taekwondo. As a child, he was a fan of the New York Yankees.

== See also ==
- List of Colorado Rockies team records

Preceded by Al Pedrique	Topps Rookie All-Star Shortstop; 1988	Succeeded by Gary Sheffield
