= Tyler Kinley =

American baseball player (born 1991)

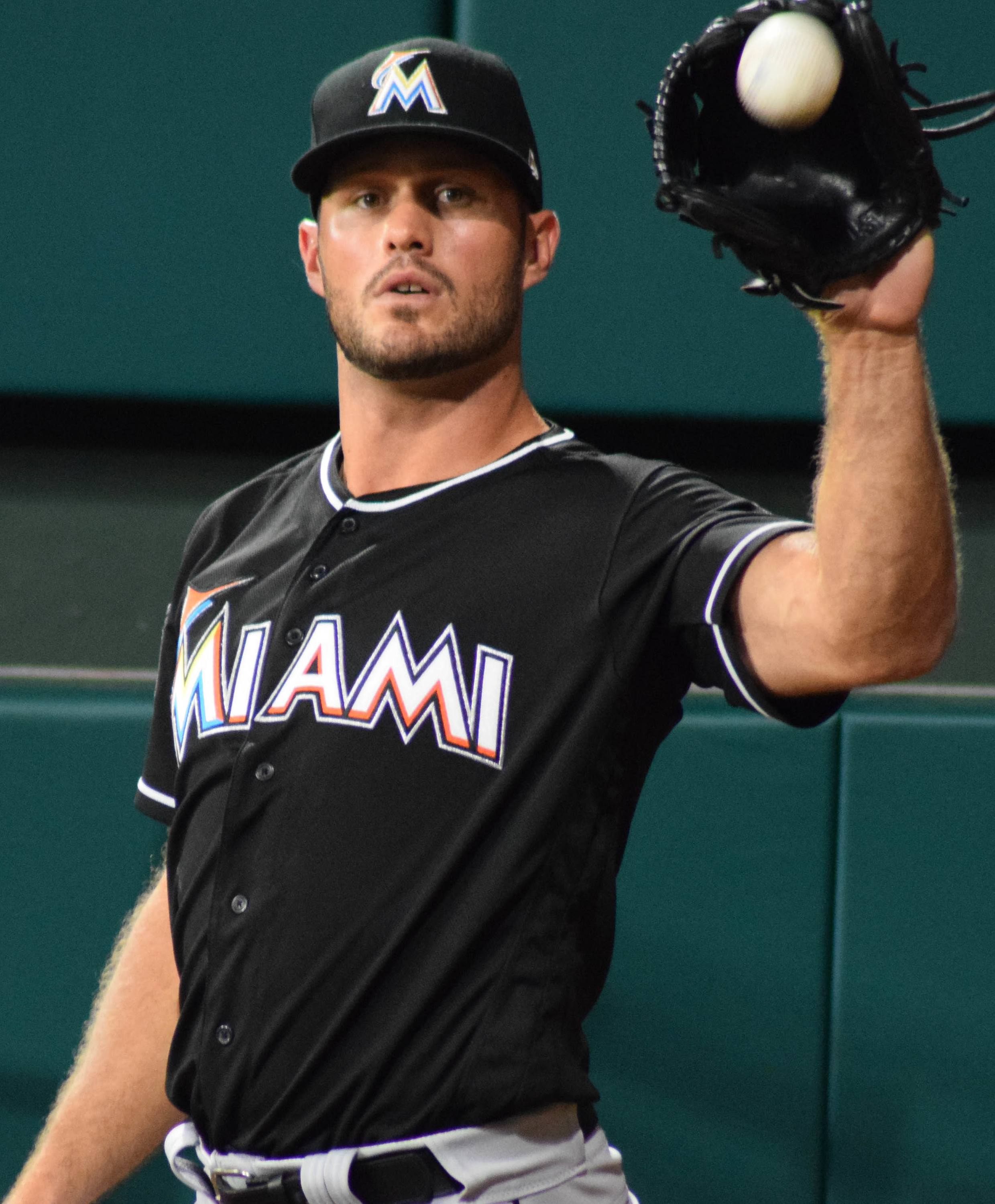
- Kinley with the Marlins in 2018

Free agent
- Pitcher
- Born: January 31, 1991 (age 35); Plantation, Florida, U.S.
- Bats: Right Throws: Right

MLB debut
- April 7, 2018, for the Minnesota Twins

MLB statistics (through 2026 season)
- Win–loss record: 26–19
- Earned run average: 4.57
- Strikeouts: 390
- Stats at Baseball Reference

Teams
- Minnesota Twins (2018); Miami Marlins (2018–2019); Colorado Rockies (2020–2025); Atlanta Braves (2025–2026); Detroit Tigers (2026)

Tyler Harrison Kinley (born January 31, 1991) is an American professional baseball pitcher who is a free agent. He has played in Major League Baseball (MLB) for the Minnesota Twins, Miami Marlins, Colorado Rockies, Atlanta Braves, and Detroit Tigers. Kinley was selected by the Marlins in the 16th round of the 2013 MLB draft and made his MLB debut in 2018 with the Twins.

== Career ==
=== Miami Marlins ===
Kinley attended Nova High School in Davie, Florida, and Barry University, where he played college baseball for the Barry Buccaneers. The Miami Marlins selected Kinley in the 16th round of the 2013 MLB draft. He was limited by injuries during his time with the Marlins organization. After he signed with the Marlins, he spent the rest of the 2013 season with both the Gulf Coast League Marlins of the Rookie-level Gulf Coast League and the Batavia Muckdogs of the Low-A New York-Penn League, pitching to a combined 0–1 win–loss record and 7.07 earned run average (ERA) in 14 innings pitched. He spent the 2014 season with the Greensboro Grasshoppers of the Single-A South Atlantic League, compiling a 3–1 record and 2.70 ERA in 28 relief appearances. In 2015, Kinley played for the Jupiter Hammerheads of the High-A Florida State League, pitching to a 1–3 record and 3.25 ERA in 44 1/3 innings.

In 2016, Kinley began the season with the Jacksonville Suns of the Double-A Southern League, where he pitched to a 3.96 ERA with 51 strikeouts in 50 innings. He was then promoted to the New Orleans Zephyrs of the Triple-A Pacific Coast League, but struggled in eight appearances. Kinley began the 2017 season Jacksonville, but pitched to a 5.19 ERA with the Jumbo Shrimp in 27 games. He was demoted to the Jupiter, where he had a 1.98 ERA. Through the end of the 2017 season, Kinley had recorded 212 strikeouts in 204 1/3 innings pitched in his minor league career.

=== Minnesota Twins ===
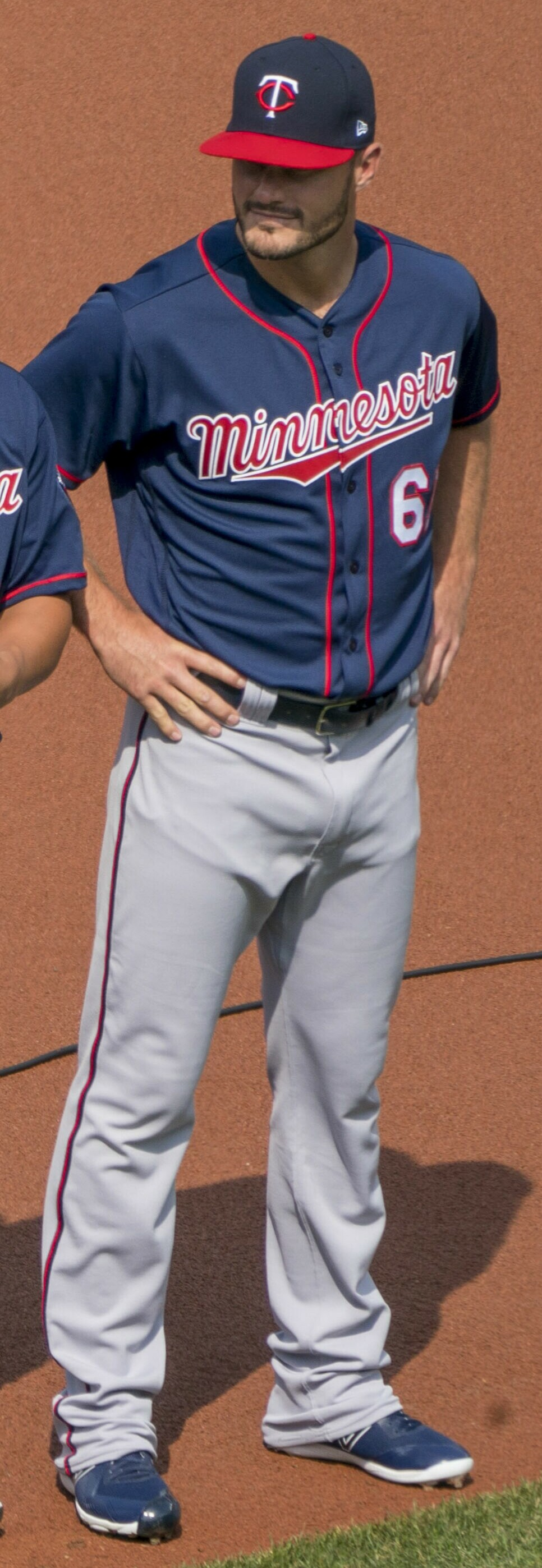
Kinley with the Minnesota Twins in 2018

After the 2017 season, the Marlins opted not to protect Kinley on their 40-man roster. Kinley then pitched for the Tigres del Licey of the Dominican Winter League, where he had a 0.47 ERA and 32 strikeouts in 19 innings pitched. The Minnesota Twins selected him from the Marlins organization in the 2017 Rule 5 draft.

Kinley made the Twins' 2018 Opening Day 25-man roster. He allowed nine earned runs on nine hits, including two home runs with four strikeouts and four walks in 3 1/3 innings pitched for a 24.30 ERA before he was designated for assignment on April 26.

=== Miami Marlins (second stint) ===
The Twins returned Kinley to the Miami Marlins on May 1, 2018. He was assigned to New Orleans. The Marlins promoted him to the major leagues on September 4. Kinley pitched to a 3.65 ERA in 49 1/3 innings pitched in the 2019 season, while also allowing 36 walks.

=== Colorado Rockies ===
On December 9, 2019, Kinley was claimed off waivers by the Colorado Rockies from Miami. In 2020 with the Rockies, Kinley recorded a 5.32 ERA with a 9.9 K/9 in 23 2/3 innings pitched in 24 appearances. In 2021, Kinley pitched in a career-high 70 games for Colorado, posting a 3-2 record and 4.73 ERA with 68 strikeouts across 70 1/3 innings of work.

On June 15, 2022, magnetic resonance imaging showed that Kinley had a flexor tear in his right elbow. He underwent season-ending surgery later that month. On the year, Kinley made 25 total appearances for Colorado, recording an excellent 0.75 ERA with 27 strikeouts over 24 innings pitched

On November 18, 2022, Kinley signed a three-year contract extension with a club option for 2026 with the Rockies. On August 1, 2023, Kinley was activated from the injured list to make his return from the previous year's injury. He made 18 appearances for the team during the regular season, struggling to an 0-4 record and 6.06 ERA with 17 strikeouts and five saves across 16 1/3 innings pitched.

Kinley made 67 appearances out of the bullpen for the Rockies during the 2024 season, pitching to a 6-1 record and 6.19 ERA with 72 strikeouts and 12 saves over 64 innings of work. In 49 appearances for Colorado in 2025, Kinley compiled a 5.66 ERA with 51 strikeouts across 47 2/3 innings pitched.

=== Atlanta Braves ===
On July 30, 2025, the Rockies traded Kinley to the Atlanta Braves in exchange for Austin Smith. He made 24 appearances down the stretch for Atlanta, posting a 5-0 record and 0.72 ERA with 22 strikeouts over 25 innings of work. On November 6, the Braves declined their club option on Kinley, making him a free agent.

On January 10, 2026, Kinley re-signed with the Braves on a one-year contract for $3 million, with a club option for 2027. In 49 appearances out of the bullpen for Atlanta, he compiled a 6–5 record and 4.01 ERA with 42 strikeouts and one save across 42 2/3 innings pitched. Kinley was designated for assignment by the Braves on August 18 and was released on August 21.

=== Detroit Tigers ===
On August 24, 2026, Kinley signed a major league contract with the Detroit Tigers.

== Personal life ==
Kinley previously said that he was related to William McKinley, the former President of the United States. He said that after McKinley was assassinated in 1901, Kinley's ancestors changed their name to protect themselves from perceived threats. However, a journalist who investigated his family history later reported that they were not related and traced Kinley's lineage back to farmers in North Carolina.

== See also ==
- Rule 5 draft results
