= Tony Diaz =

Dominican baseball player and coach (born 1977)

- Diaz with the Colorado Rockies in 2018

Atlanta Braves – No. 83
- Shortstop, Coach
- Born: January 23, 1977 (age 49); Santo Domingo, Dominican Republic
- Bats: Right Throws: Right
- Stats at Baseball Reference

Teams
- Colorado Rockies (2017–2018); Minnesota Twins (2019–2024); Atlanta Braves (2026–present)

Antonio Manuel Diaz (born January 23, 1977) is a Dominican professional baseball coach. Since 2026, he has served as a coach for the Atlanta Braves.

== Career ==
Diaz was raised in the Dominican Republic. He received multiple professional contract offers as a teenager but, on the advice of his youth coach, Manny Mota, he emigrated to the United States at 18 to play college baseball instead.

He started his college baseball career at Gulf Coast State College before moving to Florida International University where he played for the FIU Panthers baseball team. According to coach Danny Price, he was a professional prospect until suffering an arm injury. After his college career, a former teammate recommended him as a baseball coach to the Colorado Rockies who were looking specifically for bilingual coaches.

He graduated from Florida International University with a bachelor's degree in marketing. He served as the manager for the baseball team at G. Holmes Braddock High School in Miami, Florida. Diaz served as the hitting coach for the Casper Ghosts from 2001 through 2006, taking over as their manager in 2007.

=== Colorado Rockies ===
The Rockies hired Diaz as their major league first base coach before the 2017 season.

=== Minnesota Twins ===
After the 2018 season, the Twins hired Diaz as their third base coach, replacing Gene Glynn. He transitioned to the assistant bench coach role in 2022. On October 2, 2024, Diaz and the Twins parted ways.

=== Frederick Keys ===
On April 15, 2025 it was announced that Diaz would be the hitting coach for the Frederick Keys of the MLB Draft League for their upcoming 2025 season.

=== Atlanta Braves ===
In November 2025, Diaz was hired as a major league coach for the Atlanta Braves for the 2026 season.

== Personal life ==
Diaz has two children. He and his wife, Lauren live in Scottsdale, Arizona.

His father, Manuel, was shot to death in a mugging in Santo Domingo at 73 years old a few years before Diaz's first Major League coaching job.
