= Víctor Mederos =

Cuban baseball player (born 2001)

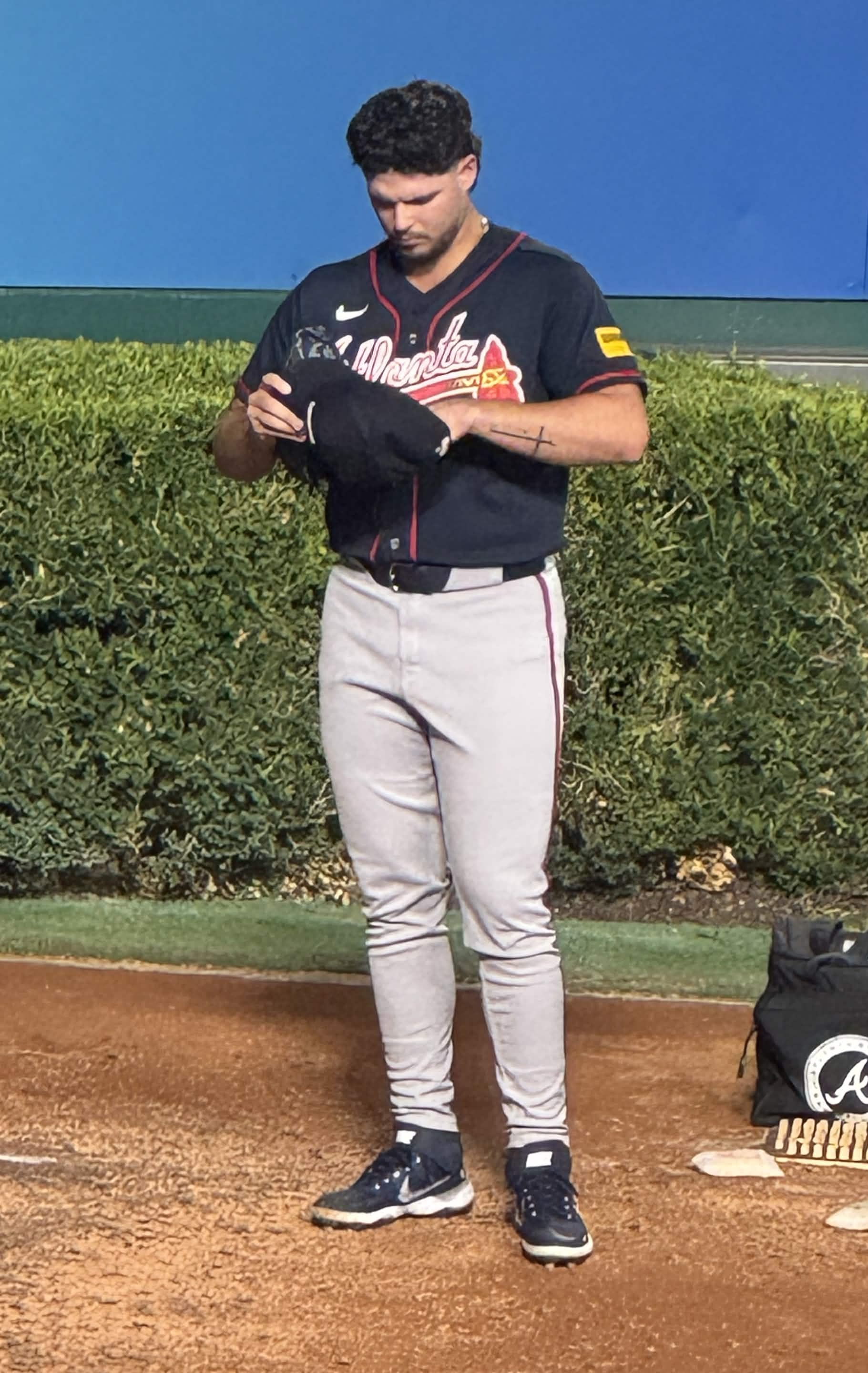
- Mederos at Nationals Park in 2026

Atlanta Braves – No. 58
- Pitcher
- Born: June 8, 2001 (age 25); Santa Clara, Cuba
- Bats: Right Throws: Right

MLB debut
- June 30, 2023, for the Los Angeles Angels

MLB statistics (through 2026 season)
- Win–loss record: 6–4
- Earned run average: 5.58
- Strikeouts: 56
- Stats at Baseball Reference

Teams
- Los Angeles Angels (2023–2025); Atlanta Braves (2026–present)

Víctor Mederos (born June 8, 2001) is a Cuban professional baseball pitcher for the Atlanta Braves of Major League Baseball (MLB). He has previously played in MLB for the Los Angeles Angels. He made his MLB debut in 2023.

== Early life ==
Mederos was born in Santa Clara, Cuba. In 2008, his family obtained travel visas allowing them to travel to Costa Rica, and then they traveled to Mexico and then to the United States. The family were allowed entry into the United States through the wet feet, dry feet policy. They settled in Miami.

== Amateur career ==
Mederos graduated from Westminster Christian School. He enrolled at the University of Miami and began his college baseball career with the Miami Hurricanes before transferring to Oklahoma State University to play for the Oklahoma State Cowboys. In 2021, he played collegiate summer baseball with the Chatham Anglers of the Cape Cod Baseball League.

== Professional career ==
=== Los Angeles Angels ===
The Los Angeles Angels selected Mederos in the sixth round, with the 178th overall selection, of the 2022 Major League Baseball draft. He made his professional debut with the High–A Tri-City Dust Devils, making 6 starts and recording a 5.63 ERA with 15 strikeouts in 16 innings of work. Mederos began the 2023 season with the Double–A Rocket City Trash Pandas, starting 12 contests and registering a 5.98 ERA with 71 strikeouts across 55 2/3 innings pitched.

On June 30, 2023, the Angels promoted Mederos to the major leagues for the first time. In 3 games for Los Angeles, he posted a 9.00 ERA with 3 strikeouts in as many innings. Mederos was optioned to the Triple–A Salt Lake Bees to begin the 2024 season. In 4 appearances for the Angels, he struggled to an 0–1 record and 11.81 ERA with 5 strikeouts across 5 1/3 innings pitched.

Mederos was optioned to Triple-A Salt Lake to begin the 2025 season. He made five appearances (three starts) for Los Angeles during the regular season, but struggled to an 0–2 record and 7.41 ERA with 14 strikeouts over 17 innings of work. On August 24, 2025, Mederos was placed on the injured list due to right shoulder inflammation. He was transferred to the 60-day injured list on September 3, officially ending his season.

Mederos was again optioned to Triple-A Salt Lake to begin the 2026 season. After allowing seven runs for the Bees in his first start, Mederos was designated for assignment by the Angels on March 29, 2026.

=== Atlanta Braves ===
On April 3, 2026, Mederos was traded to the Atlanta Braves in exchange for international bonus pool space. On July 17, Mederos recorded his first career hit, a two–RBI single off of Kyle Higashioka of the Texas Rangers in a 15–1 win. On July 31, he logged his first career win, allowing one run in one inning of relief during a 5–4 victory over the Washington Nationals.
