= Grant Holmes =

American baseball player (born 1996)

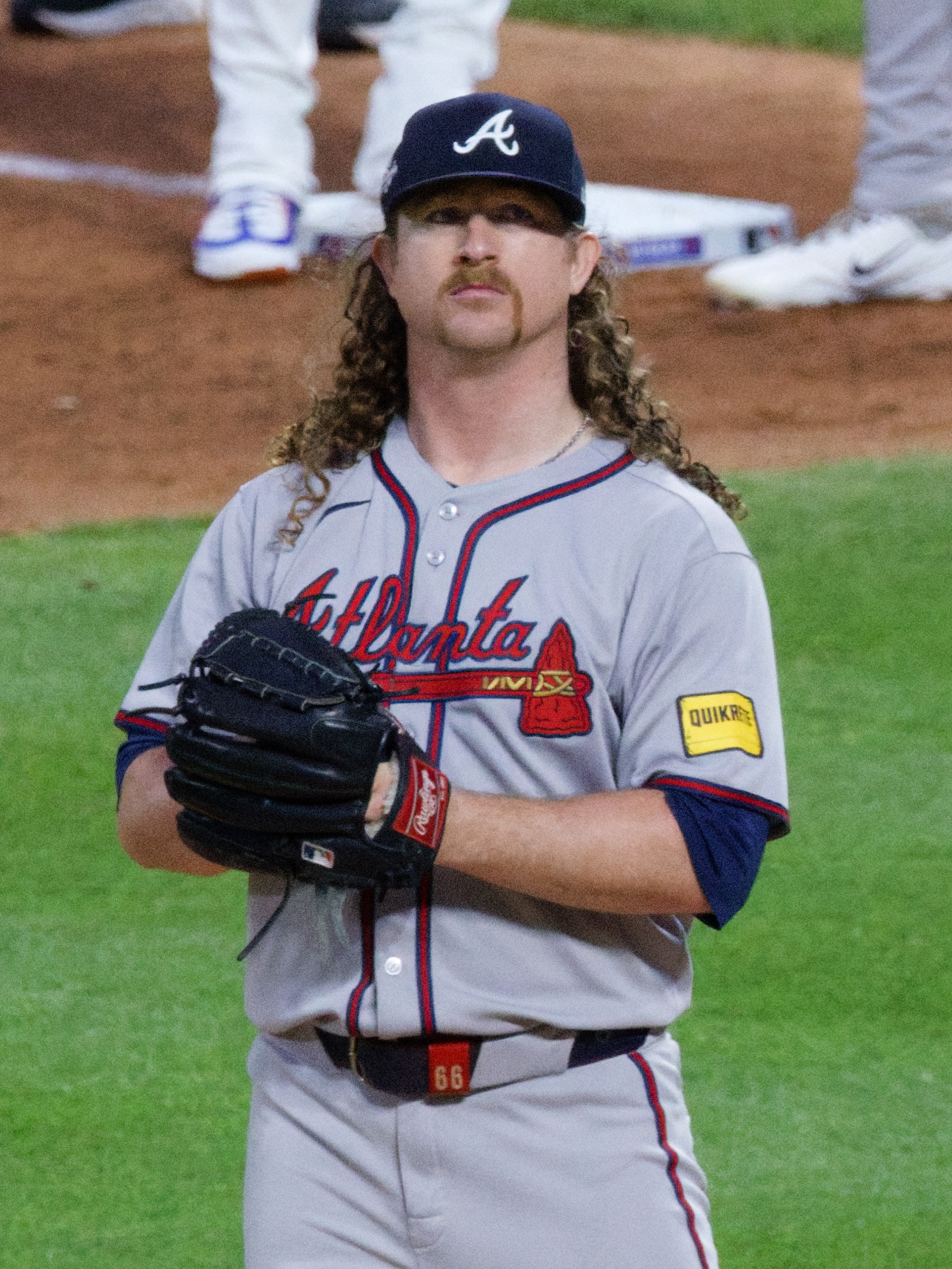
- Holmes with the Braves in 2025

Atlanta Braves – No. 66
- Pitcher
- Born: March 22, 1996 (age 30); Conway, South Carolina, U.S.
- Bats: Left Throws: Right

MLB debut
- June 16, 2024, for the Atlanta Braves

MLB statistics (through 2026 season)
- Win–loss record: 16–16
- Earned run average: 3.65
- Strikeouts: 308
- Stats at Baseball Reference

Teams
- Atlanta Braves (2024–present)

Harrison Grant Holmes (born March 22, 1996) is an American professional baseball pitcher for the Atlanta Braves of Major League Baseball (MLB). He was drafted by the Los Angeles Dodgers in the first round of the 2014 MLB draft. He made his MLB debut in 2024 with the Braves.

== Career ==
=== Amateur career ===
Holmes attended Conway High School in Conway, South Carolina. He was considered one of the top prospects for the 2014 Major League Baseball draft. He committed to the University of Florida.

=== Los Angeles Dodgers ===
The Los Angeles Dodgers selected Holmes in the first round, with the 22nd pick, in the 2014 draft. Holmes signed with the Dodgers on June 17, 2014, for a $2.5 million signing bonus. The Dodgers assigned him to the Arizona League Dodgers to begin his professional career. He was 1–2 with a 3.00 ERA in seven appearances for them, before he was promoted, on August 14, 2014, to the Ogden Raptors. In four starts for Ogden, he was 1-1 with a 4.91 ERA. Holmes was assigned to the Great Lakes Loons to start the 2015 season. He was selected to the mid-season All-Star team. He finished the season with a 6–4 record and 3.14 ERA in 24 starts. Holmes was promoted to the Rancho Cucamonga Quakes to start the 2016 season.

=== Oakland Athletics ===
On August 1, 2016, the Dodgers traded Holmes, Jharel Cotton, and Frankie Montas to the Oakland Athletics in exchange for Rich Hill and Josh Reddick. Oakland assigned Holmes to the Stockton Ports, where he finished the season; in 26 total games (23 starts) between Rancho Cucamonga and Stockton, he posted a combined 11–7 record and 4.63 ERA. Holmes spent 2017 with the Midland RockHounds, pitching to an 11–12 record and 4.49 ERA with 150 strikeouts in 148 1/3 innings pitched.

On November 20, 2018, the Athletics added Holmes to their 40-man roster to protect him from the Rule 5 draft. Holmes missed over a month during the year with shoulder soreness, and split the 2019 season between Midland and the Las Vegas Aviators, going a combined 6–5 with a 3.23 ERA and 81 strikeouts over 86 1/3 innings. Holmes did not play in a game in 2020 due to the cancellation of the minor league season because of the COVID-19 pandemic. In 2021, Holmes played for Triple-A Las Vegas, and pitched to a 8.01 ERA in 36 appearances for the team. On April 1, 2022, the Athletics sent Holmes outright to Las Vegas, removing him from their 40-man roster. He was released on July 28, 2022.

=== Atlanta Braves ===
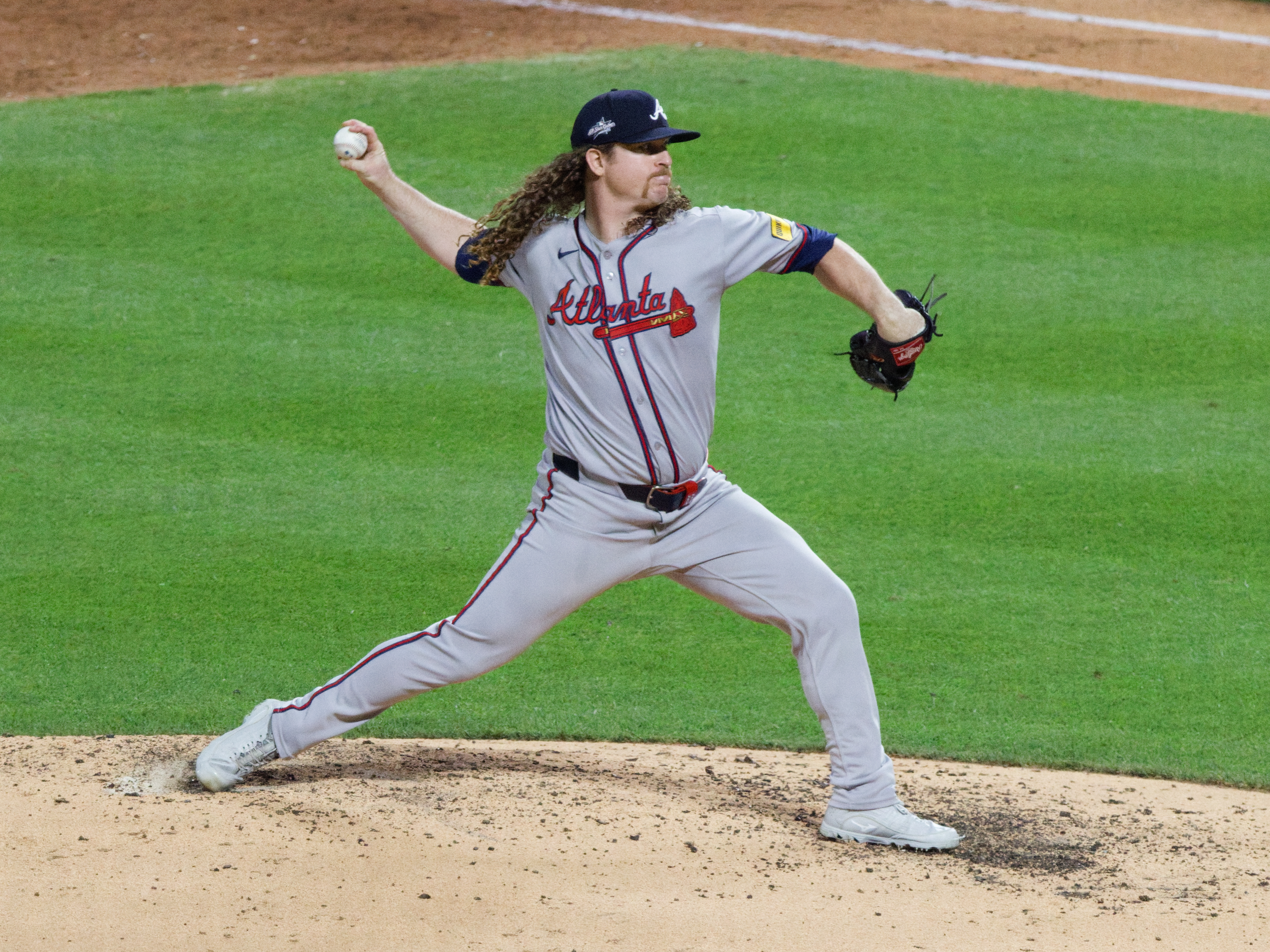
Holmes with the Braves in 2025

On August 13, 2022, Holmes signed a minor league contract with the Atlanta Braves organization. He made three appearances split between the rookie–level Florida Complex League Braves and High–A Rome Braves to conclude the year.

Holmes spent the 2023 season with the Triple–A Gwinnett Stripers, appearing in 50 games and registering a 7–3 record and 3.54 ERA with 74 strikeouts and 13 saves across 61 innings of work. He elected free agency following the season on November 6.

On November 22, 2023, Holmes re–signed with the Braves on a new minor league contract. In 18 games for the Triple–A Gwinnett, he logged a 2.63 ERA with 51 strikeouts and 4 saves. On June 16, 2024, Holmes was selected to the 40–man roster and promoted to the major leagues for the first time. He made his MLB debut later that day against the Tampa Bay Rays, pitching three scoreless innings in relief and recording two strikeouts. On July 29, Holmes made his first career start, against the Milwaukee Brewers, allowing one run in five innings while recording eight strikeouts in a no-decision. He ended the 2024 season with a 2-1 record, a 3.56 ERA, and striking out 70 batters in seven starts.

On June 15, 2025, Holmes set a personal best with fifteen strikeouts thrown in a single game. In 22 appearances (21 starts) for Atlanta, he compiled a 4-9 record and 3.99 ERA with 123 strikeouts over 115 innings of work. On July 27, Holmes was placed on the injured list due to right elbow inflammation. Later in the same day, he was transferred to the 60-day injured list, ending his season. Holmes was subsequently diagnosed with a partially torn ulnar collateral ligament, and told reporters he would attempt to rehabilitate the injury without surgery.

== Personal life ==
Holmes' brother, Colby Holmes, played college baseball at the University of South Carolina and played in the Atlanta Braves organization.

Holmes and his wife, Sami, married in February 2020.
