= JR Ritchie =

American baseball player (born 2003)

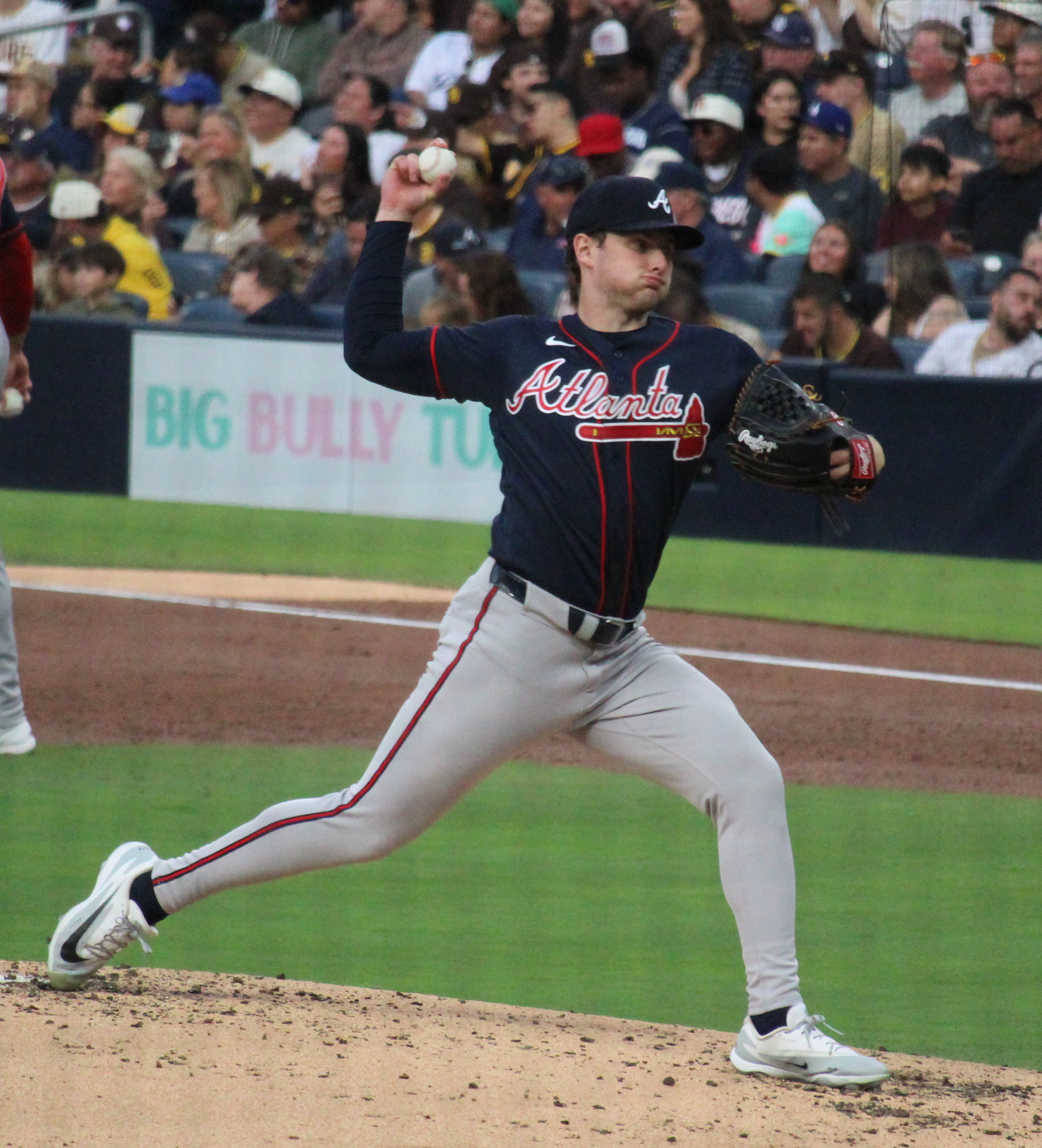
- Ritchie with the Atlanta Braves in 2026

Atlanta Braves – No. 60
- Pitcher
- Born: June 26, 2003 (age 23); Seattle, Washington, U.S.
- Bats: Right Throws: Right

MLB debut
- April 23, 2026, for the Atlanta Braves

MLB statistics (through 2026 season)
- Win–loss record: 1–5
- Earned run average: 4.91
- Strikeouts: 68
- Stats at Baseball Reference

Teams
- Atlanta Braves (2026–present)

Ian "JR" Ritchie Jr. (born June 26, 2003) is an American professional baseball pitcher for the Atlanta Braves of Major League Baseball (MLB). He made his MLB debut in 2026.

== Early life and amateur career ==
Ritchie was raised on Bainbridge Island, Washington, where he attended Bainbridge High School. His sophomore season was canceled due to the COVID-19 pandemic. During that year, Ritchie added 20 pounds (9.1 kg) of muscle to his build, which resulted in increased velocity on his pitches. He was named the Gatorade Washington Baseball Player of the Year as a junior after he went 6–0 record with a 0.38 earned run average (ERA) and 54 strikeouts in 23 2/3 innings pitched while also batting .531 with 24 runs scored. He committed to play college baseball at UCLA. Ritchie emerged as high-round prospect for the Major League Baseball (MLB) draft during his senior season. He finished his senior season with a 7–0 win–loss record, yielding two earned runs, 12 hits, 74 strikeouts, and four walks in 35 1/3 innings pitched. Following the end of his senior season, Ritchie participated in the 2022 Draft Combine.

== Professional career ==
=== Minor leagues ===
Ritchie was selected by the Atlanta Braves with the 35th overall selection of the 2022 MLB draft. He signed with the team and received an over-slot signing bonus of $2.4 million. He made five starts split between the rookie-level Florida Complex League Braves and the Single-A Augusta GreenJackets, posting a 1.88 ERA with 14 strikeouts in 14 1/3 innings pitched.

In 2023, Ritchie returned to Augusta, making four starts and registering a 5.40 ERA with 25 strikeouts in 13 1/3 innings of work. He last pitched on May 6, and later that month, it was reported that Ritchie would undergo Tommy John surgery to repair a moderate UCL tear in his right elbow and miss the remainder of the season.

In 2024, Ritchie appeared in 12 games, 11 of them starts, across three levels of Atlanta's minor league system, with the High-A Rome Emperors, the Single-A Augusta GreenJackets, and with the rookie-level Florida Complex League Braves. In 2025, Ritchie again appeared at three levels of Atlanta's minor league system, this time with Rome, the Double-A Columbus Clingstones, and the Triple-A Gwinnett Stripers, making 26 appearances, all starts. He began the 2026 season with a late cut from Braves spring training, instead starting the year with Triple-A Gwinnett, where he made five appearances, all starts.

=== Major leagues ===
On April 23, 2026, Ritchie was selected to Atlanta's 40-man roster and promoted to the major leagues for the first time. He made his MLB debut later that day against the Washington Nationals, allowing two earned runs on five hits while recording seven strikeouts over seven innings and earning the win.
