= Rolddy Muñoz =

Dominican baseball player (born 2000)

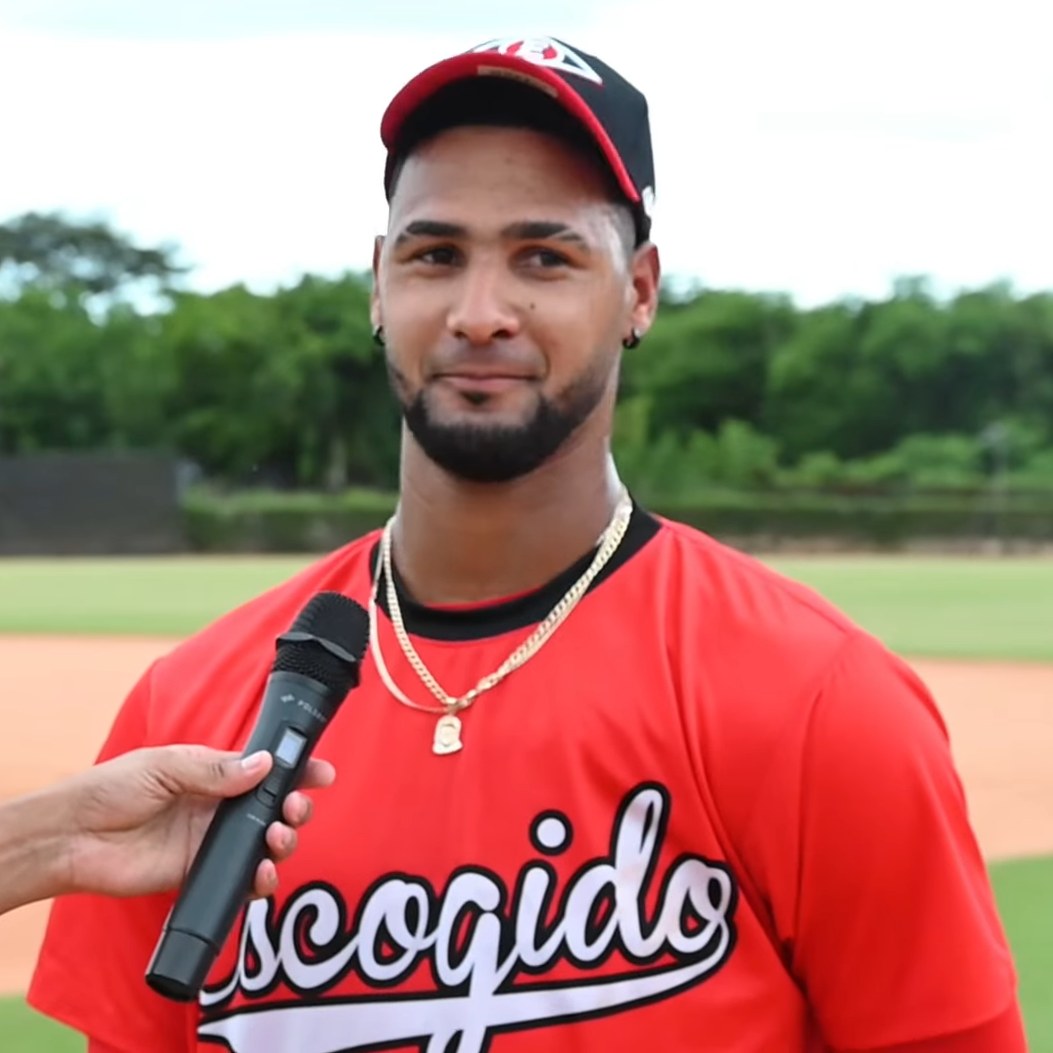
- Muñoz with the Leones del Escogido in 2025

Atlanta Braves – No. 67
- Pitcher
- Born: April 14, 2000 (age 26); Santo Domingo, Dominican Republic
- Bats: Right Throws: Right

MLB debut
- September 2, 2025, for the Atlanta Braves

MLB statistics (through 2026 season)
- Win–loss record: 0–0
- Earned run average: 12.71
- Strikeouts: 8
- Stats at Baseball Reference

Teams
- Atlanta Braves (2025–present)

Rolddy Muñoz (born April 14, 2000) is a Dominican professional baseball pitcher for the Atlanta Braves of Major League Baseball (MLB). He made his MLB debut in 2025.

== Career ==
On June 14, 2019, Muñoz signed with the Atlanta Braves as an international free agent. He made his professional debut with the Dominican Summer League Braves. Muñoz did not play in a game in 2020 due to the cancellation of the minor league season because of the COVID-19 pandemic.

In 2021, with the rookie-level Florida Complex League Braves and Single-A Augusta GreenJackets, Muñoz pitched to a 4–2 win–loss record and 5.40 earned run average (ERA) with 48 strikeouts over 35 innings pitched in 16 appearances split between the two affiliates. Muñoz split the 2022 campaign between Augusta and the High-A Rome Braves, accumulating a 1–3 record and 5.90 ERA with 79 strikeouts across 32 appearances.

Muñoz returned to Rome in 2023, making 20 appearances (7 starts) and logging a 4–1 record and 2.29 ERA with 60 strikeouts across 59 innings pitched. The 2024 season was split between the Double-A Mississippi Braves and Rome. In 38 combined appearances, Muñoz compiled a 3–3 record and 4.24 ERA with 75 strikeouts and 4 saves across 51 innings of work.

On November 18, 2024, the Braves added Muñoz to their 40-man roster to protect him from the Rule 5 draft. Muñoz was optioned to the Triple-A Gwinnett Stripers to begin the 2025 season. In 37 appearances split between Gwinnett and the Double-A Columbus Clingstones, he accumulated a 3–3 record and 2.75 ERA with 51 strikeouts and six saves. Muñoz was promoted to the major leagues for the first time on September 2, 2025, and made his debut on the same date. He made three appearances for Atlanta during his rookie campaign, allowing five runs on four hits with five strikeouts across 3 2/3 innings pitched.

Muñoz was optioned to Triple-A Gwinnett to begin the 2026 season.

== Personal life ==
Muñoz's identical twin brother, Roddery Muñoz, is also a professional baseball pitcher.
