= AJ Smith-Shawver =

American baseball player (born 2002)

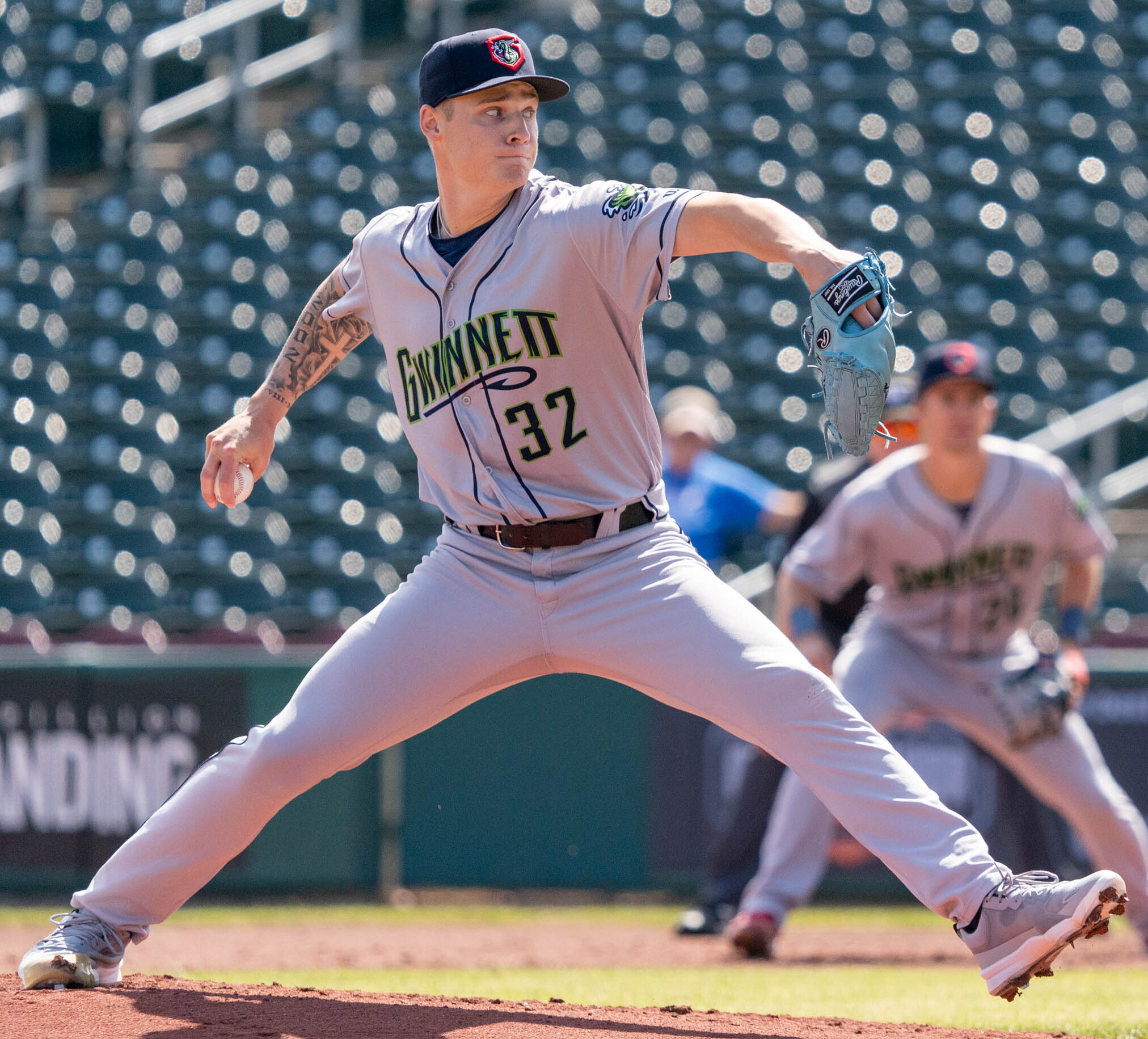
- Smith-Shawver with the Gwinnett Stripers in 2024

Atlanta Braves – No. 32
- Pitcher
- Born: November 20, 2002 (age 23); Fort Worth, Texas, U.S.
- Bats: Right Throws: Right

MLB debut
- June 4, 2023, for the Atlanta Braves

MLB statistics (through 2026 season)
- Win–loss record: 4–5
- Earned run average: 4.61
- Strikeouts: 93
- Stats at Baseball Reference

Teams
- Atlanta Braves (2023–present)

AJ Smith-Shawver (born November 20, 2002) is an American professional baseball pitcher for the Atlanta Braves of Major League Baseball (MLB). He made his MLB debut in 2023.

== Amateur career ==
Smith-Shawver grew up in Colleyville, Texas and attended Colleyville Heritage High School, where he played baseball and football. He was Colleyville Heritage's starting quarterback and passed for 2,616 yards and 25 touchdowns as a senior. He stopped pitching to focus on football, and was named All-Area by the Dallas Morning News as a third baseman after batting .344 with 20 RBIs. Smith-Shawver committed to play both college baseball and college football at Texas Tech University.

== Professional career ==
=== Draft and minor leagues ===
The Atlanta Braves selected Smith-Shawver in the seventh round of the 2021 Major League Baseball draft. He signed with the team, foregoing his commitment to Texas Tech, and received an over-slot signing bonus of $997,500. After signing, Smith-Shawver was assigned to the Rookie-level Florida Complex League Braves and made four appearances. He spent the 2022 season with the Single-A Augusta GreenJackets. While pitching in the FCL and for the GreenJackets, Smith-Shawver focused on developing a slider.

The following year, Smith-Shawver began the season with the Rome Braves. At the High-A level, he made three starts, threw fourteen scoreless innings with four walks and 23 strikeouts, while yielding six hits. On May 2, Smith-Shawver was promoted to the Mississippi Braves. He allowed five hits in seven scoreless innings over two appearances at the Double-A level, then made his Triple-A debut with the Gwinnett Stripers on May 19, yielding his first earned runs on the 2023 season.

=== Atlanta Braves ===
On May 30, 2023, the Braves selected Smith-Shawver's contract and promoted him to the major leagues for the first time. He faced the Arizona Diamondbacks in his major league debut on June 4, pitching 2 1/3 innings of relief while recording three strikeouts and one walk. Smith-Shawver made his first start against the Washington Nationals on June 9, yielding two unearned runs on three hits in 5 1/3 innings. On June 15, Smith-Shawver earned his first win, giving up six hits and one walk with six strikeouts in 5 2/3 innings against the Colorado Rockies. He became the youngest Braves pitcher to win a game since Steve Avery on August 24, 1990. On June 26, Shawver was optioned back down to Gwinnett to make room on the roster for the Braves to promote relief pitcher Dereck Rodriguez.

Smith-Shawver was invited to spring training before the 2024 regular season began, but did not make the club and was optioned to Triple-A Gwinnett.

On May 5, 2025, Smith-Shawver pitched eight shutout innings in the longest start of his professional career. He did not yield a hit until the top of the eighth, to Santiago Espinal of the Cincinnati Reds. He was removed from a game on May 29, and placed on the 15-day injured list. Smith-Shawver was subsequently moved to the 60-day IL and diagnosed with a UCL tear. He underwent Tommy John surgery on June 9, officially ending his season.

== Personal life ==
AJ Smith was raised by his mother Laurie and stepfather Jason. He added Shawver to his surname while in high school. He is now dating Josie Canseco, daughter of former MLB star, Jose Canseco.
