= Owen Murphy (baseball) =

American baseball player (born 2003)

Atlanta Braves – No. 73
- Pitcher
- Born: September 27, 2003 (age 23); Chicago, Illinois, U.S.
- Bats: Right Throws: Right

MLB debut
- July 6, 2026, for the Atlanta Braves

MLB statistics (through 2026 season)
- Win–loss record: 0–1
- Earned run average: 6.00
- Strikeouts: 9
- Stats at Baseball Reference

Teams
- Atlanta Braves (2026–present)

Owen Jameson Murphy (born September 27, 2003) is an American professional baseball pitcher for the Atlanta Braves of Major League Baseball (MLB). He made his MLB debut in 2026.

== Amateur career ==
Murphy began baseball-related activities at the age of four, when his father Mike signed him up for a class offered by the Riverside Recreation Department. Mike Murphy became his son's coach in Little League and travel league baseball when Owen was seven. When he was 13, Murphy began the Rake City baseball training program. Murphy attended Riverside Brookfield High School. He played high school baseball as a pitcher and shortstop, and was also a quarterback and wide receiver for the football team. During his junior season in 2021, he pitched to a 6–1 record and a 0.33 ERA alongside hitting nine home runs. As a senior in 2022, he went 9–0 with a 0.12 ERA, surrendering ten hits while striking out 137 batters over 58 1/3 innings and was named the Illinois Gatorade Player of the Year. He committed to play college baseball at the University of Notre Dame.

== Professional career ==
The Atlanta Braves selected Murphy in the first round with the 20th overall selection of the 2022 Major League Baseball draft. He signed with the team for $2.56 million.

Murphy made his professional debut with the Rookie-level Florida Complex League Braves and he also played with the Low-A Augusta GreenJackets. Over 12 innings, he gave up six earned runs. He opened the 2023 season with Augusta and was promoted to the High-A Rome Braves in August. Over 21 starts between the two teams, Murphy went 6–4 with a 4.72 ERA and 113 strikeouts over 89 2/3 innings.

Murphy began the 2024 campaign with the High–A Rome Emperors, compiling a 4–2 record and 1.54 ERA with sixty strikeouts across seven starts. On May 29, 2024, it was announced that Murphy would require Tommy John surgery, ending his season. Murphy returned to play in 2025, making one rehab start with the FCL Braves before being assigned to Rome. Across six starts with Rome, he went 3–0 with a 1.32 ERA and 29 strikeouts. Murphy opened the 2026 season with the Double-A Columbus Clingstones and was promoted to the Triple-A Gwinnett Stripers in late April. He made 23 total starts between the two teams and had a 6–9 record, a 3.61 ERA, and 121 strikeouts over 117 1/3 inning.

On July 6, 2026, Murphy was selected to Atlanta's 40-man roster and promoted to the major leagues for the first time. He made his MLB debut that night at Truist Park against the New York Mets and gave up one run across one inning pitched in relief while also recording his first MLB strikeout via Brett Baty. The next day, he was optioned back to Gwinnett. Murphy was recalled by the Braves once more on July 11 and then again optioned to Gwinnett on July 19. He was recalled for a final time on September 13. Murphy pitched in a total of five games for the Braves and had a 0–1 record, a 6.00 ERA, and nine strikeouts across 12 innings.
