= Didier Fuentes =

Colombian baseball player (born 2005)

Atlanta Braves – No. 72
- Pitcher
- Born: June 17, 2005 (age 21); Tolú, Colombia
- Bats: Right Throws: Right

MLB debut
- June 20, 2025, for the Atlanta Braves

MLB statistics (through 2026 season)
- Win–loss record: 7–5
- Earned run average: 4.17
- Strikeouts: 104
- Stats at Baseball Reference

Teams
- Atlanta Braves (2025–present)

Didier Nicolás Fuentes (born June 17, 2005) is a Colombian professional baseball pitcher for the Atlanta Braves of Major League Baseball (MLB). He made his MLB debut in 2025.

== Career ==
Fuentes signed with the Atlanta Braves as an international free agent on January 15, 2022. He made his professional debut that season with the Dominican Summer League Braves. Fuentes made 10 appearances (seven starts) for the Single-A Augusta GreenJackets in 2023, posting an 0-4 record and 7.27 ERA with 27 strikeouts over 26 innings of work. He returned to Augusta in 2024, logging a 3-6 record and 2.74 ERA with 98 strikeouts across 18 appearances (17 starts).

Fuentes started 2025 with the Rome Emperors before being promoted to the Columbus Clingstones and Gwinnett Stripers. On June 20, he was selected to Atlanta's 40-man roster and promoted to the major leagues for the first time. He made his MLB debut later that day against the Miami Marlins, yielding four earned runs on six hits in five innings and earning the loss. Debuting at 20 years old, Fuentes became the third-youngest starting pitcher in Atlanta history and the youngest MLB starter to debut since Julio Urías in May 2016. He made four starts for Atlanta during his rookie campaign, struggling to an 0-3 record and 13.85 ERA with 12 strikeouts over 13 innings of work. On August 25, Fuentes was shut down for the remainder of the season due to right shoulder inflammation.

Fuentes was optioned to Triple-A Gwinnett to begin the 2026 season. On May 1, 2026, he recorded his first career win after pitching a scoreless inning in relief against the Colorado Rockies.

In the 2026 NLDS, Fuentes pitched 3 2/3 innings in relief, retiring 11 consecutive batters, before allowing a solo home run to Max Muncy to break the perfect outing. His efforts ultimately led to the Braves taking game 2.
