= Blake Burkhalter =

American baseball player (born 2000)

Atlanta Braves – No. 76
- Pitcher
- Born: September 19, 2000 (age 26); Tuscaloosa, Alabama, U.S.
- Bats: Right Throws: Right

MLB debut
- September 1, 2026, for the Atlanta Braves

MLB statistics (through 2026 season)
- Win–loss record: 0–0
- Earned run average: 9.00
- Strikeouts: 1
- Stats at Baseball Reference

Teams
- Atlanta Braves (2026–present)

Blake Jackson Burkhalter (born September 19, 2000) is an American professional baseball pitcher for the Atlanta Braves of Major League Baseball (MLB). He made his MLB debut in 2026.

== Amateur career ==
Burkhalter attended Northview High School in Dothan, Alabama, and graduated in 2019. He attended Auburn University and played three years of college baseball for the Auburn Tigers. He served as the team's closer in 2022, recording 16 saves and a 3.69 earned run average (ERA) over thirty games played.

== Professional career ==
After the 2022 college baseball season, Burkhalter was selected by the Atlanta Braves in the second round of the 2022 Major League Baseball draft. He signed with the team for $647,500.

Burkhalter made four appearances between the Rookie-level Florida Complex League Braves and the Single-A Augusta GreenJackets in 2022. He underwent Tommy John surgery and missed the whole 2023 season. Burkhalter returned to play in 2024, opening the season playing two games with the Complex League Braves and spending the rest of the season with the High-A Rome Emperors. Over 16 starts between the two teams, Burkhalter went 3–4 with a 3.00 ERA and 69 strikeouts over 72 innings. He was assigned to the Double-A Columbus Clingstones to open the 2025 season. In July, he was promoted to the Triple-A Gwinnett Stripers. Burkhalter appeared in 32 games (making 16 starts) with both teams and went 4–7 with a 3.32 ERA and 88 strikeouts over 103 innings.

Burkhalter opened the 2026 season with Gwinnett on the injured list with back spasms. He was activated from the injured list in mid-June after four rehab appearances and was assigned to Columbus, moving to the bullpen full-time. In early July, he was promoted to Gwinnett. Burkhalter logged 16 relief outings for Gwinnett, recording a 1.48 ERA with 29 strikeouts. On September 1, 2026, Burkhalter was selected to the 40–man roster and promoted to the major leagues for the first time. He made his MLB debut that night against the Washington Nationals and gave up one run across one inning pitched in relief. He was optioned back to Gwinnett the following day.
