= Jim Jarvis (baseball) =

American baseball player (born 2000)

Atlanta Braves – No. 74
- Shortstop
- Born: November 6, 2000 (age 25); San Diego, California, U.S.
- Bats: Left Throws: Right

MLB debut
- May 6, 2026, for the Atlanta Braves

MLB statistics (through 2026 season)
- Batting average: .207
- Home runs: 1
- Runs batted in: 11
- Stats at Baseball Reference

Teams
- Atlanta Braves (2026–present)

James Patrick Jarvis (born November 6, 2000) is an American professional baseball shortstop for the Atlanta Braves of Major League Baseball (MLB). He made his MLB debut in 2026.

== Amateur career ==
Jarvis attended Clairemont High School in San Diego, California, and played college baseball at the University of Alabama. In four seasons at Alabama, he played in 196 games, slashing .262/.373/.366 with 10 home runs, 75 RBI, and 25 stolen bases. In 2021, he played collegiate summer baseball with the Wareham Gatemen of the Cape Cod Baseball League. As a senior, Jarvis was named to the SEC All-Defensive Team. He was selected by the Detroit Tigers in the 11th round of the 2023 Major League Baseball draft.

== Professional career ==
=== Detroit Tigers ===
Jarvis made his professional debut in 2023 with the Florida Complex League Tigers and Lakeland Flying Tigers. He began the 2024 season with Lakeland before being promoted to the High-A West Michigan Whitecaps. Between the two affiliates in 2024, Jarvis slashed .237/.331/.332 with five home runs, 41 RBI, and 25 stolen bases. He began the 2025 season with the Double-A Erie SeaWolves.

=== Atlanta Braves ===
On July 30, 2025, Jarvis was traded to the Atlanta Braves in exchange for Rafael Montero. He finished the 2025 season slashing .249/.324/.347 across three affiliates. After the season, he played in the Arizona Fall League with the Glendale Desert Dogs.

To begin the 2026 season, Jarvis was assigned to the Triple-A Gwinnett Stripers. He opened the season at a torrid pace, batting .305/.418/.445 with four home runs, 20 RBI, and 15 stolen bases in 33 games. On May 6, 2026, Jarvis was selected to the 40-man roster and promoted to the major leagues for the first time. He made his MLB debut later that day, starting at shortstop against the Seattle Mariners, going hitless in two at-bats while contributing defensively with an assist in a double play. Jarvis hit his first career home run on July 9 against Cam Sanders of the Pittsburgh Pirates.

== Personal life ==
Jarvis became known by the nickname Jimmy Baseball as a child, while playing the sport alongside his two brothers.
