= 2025 New York Mets season =

2025 New York Mets
- League: National League
- Division: East
- Ballpark: Citi Field
- City: New York City, New York
- Record: 83–79 (.512)
- Divisional place: 2nd
- Owner: Steve Cohen
- President: David Stearns
- Manager: Carlos Mendoza
- Television: SportsNet New York; PIX 11 (Note: Games on PIX 11 also air on WCCT-TV (Hartford, CT), WCWN/WRGB (Albany, NY), WYCI (Saranac Lake, NY), WSYT-MY43 (Syracuse, NY), WPNY-LD (Utica, NY), WICZ-DT2 (Binghamton, NY), WQMY (Williamsport, PA), WOLF-DT3 (Scranton, PA) and WHAM-DT2 (Rochester, NY).)
- Radio: WHSQ 880 AM (English); New York Mets Radio Network

The 2025 New York Mets season was the 64th season of the New York Mets in Major League Baseball, their 17th at Citi Field, their fifth under majority owner Steve Cohen, and their second under manager Carlos Mendoza.

On July 19, the Mets retired the number 5 worn by former captain David Wright and inducted him into the Mets Hall of Fame during a pre-game ceremony before a 5–2 loss to the Cincinnati Reds at Citi Field. Wright became the 10th individual to have his number retired by the Mets, and only the second, along with Tom Seaver, to be inducted into the team's Hall of Fame on the same day.

Although the Mets opened the season with a 45–24 record through June 12, the best record in MLB at the time and the second-most wins through the first 70 games in franchise history (behind only the 1986 team that won 49 of its first 70 games and went on to win the World Series), and attaining a 96.2% odds to make the playoffs, the team collapsed down the stretch. They finished 38–55 the rest of the way and endured three separate losing streaks of seven or more games. They became only the third team in the Wild Card era to start 45–24 or better and still miss the postseason, joining the 2002 Red Sox and 2003 Seattle Mariners. The team also suffered their most lopsided series defeat in franchise history, getting outscored 30–4 from June 27–29 by the Pittsburgh Pirates.

The Mets were the only team in the 2025 season to go winless when trailing after the eighth inning, going 0–70. In addition, the Mets went through a 60-game stretch where David Peterson was the only starter to last six innings, a dubious distinction going back to 1901. On September 17, Dom Hamel became the 46th pitcher used by the Mets in 2025, setting a new MLB record for the most pitchers used by a single team in one season, surpassing the previous record held by the 2024 Miami Marlins. The record was later tied by the 2025 Atlanta Braves on September 28. The Mets also blew 4+ run leads for three consecutive games for the first time in franchise history.

On a positive note, Juan Soto joined the 30–30 club on September 9, and also broke his career high for hitting his 42nd home run of the season on September 19, eventually hitting his 43rd of the season nearly a week later on September 24. Francisco Lindor also joined the 30–30 club on September 23, marking the second time in Mets history that two teammates achieved the feat in the same season, following Howard Johnson and Darryl Strawberry had done so in 1987. In addition, Pete Alonso hit his 253rd career home run, breaking Darryl Strawberry's Mets franchise record of 252 home runs. Nolan McLean was promoted from AAA on August 13, and is the Mets pitcher to earn a win in his first four career starts.

The Mets finished the season 83–79, marking their second consecutive winning season (their first such stretch since 2015–2016). They ended with the same record as the Reds but lost the head-to-head tiebreaker, as Cincinnati won the season series four games to two. However, despite the Reds losing 4–2 to the Milwaukee Brewers in their final game on September 28, the Mets were eliminated from playoff contention for the seventh time in nine years after a 4–0 loss to the Miami Marlins the same day.

This was the final season for Pete Alonso and Edwin Díaz who both left in free agency signing with the Baltimore Orioles and Los Angeles Dodgers in the offseason, respectively. Other major offseason departures include the loss of Brandon Nimmo in a trade to the Texas Rangers and Jeff McNeil in a trade to the Athletics.

The New York Mets drew an average home attendance of 39,775, the 5th-highest of all MLB teams.

== Offseason ==
=== Transactions ===
==== 2024 ====
- November 4 – claimed right-handed relief pitcher Kevin Herget off waivers from the Milwaukee Brewers.
- November 4 – claimed infielder Luis De Los Santos off waivers from the Toronto Blue Jays.
- November 19 – acquired outfielder Jose Siri from the Tampa Bay Rays in exchange for right-handed pitcher Eric Orze.
- December 4 – signed right-handed starting pitcher Frankie Montas to a two-year, $34 million contract including an opt-out after the 2025 season.
- December 9 – signed right-handed pitcher Clay Holmes to a three-year, $38 million contract including an opt-out after the 2026 season.
- December 11 – signed outfielder Juan Soto to a 15-year, $765 million contract, the largest contract in professional sports history. The deal includes an opt-out after the 2029 season and no deferred money. The Mets can void it by increasing his annual salary in the final 10 seasons by $4 million from $51 to $55 million, making the total value up to $805 million. In addition, Soto will also get a $75 million signing bonus in the contract.
- December 19 – signed right-handed starting pitcher Griffin Canning to a one-year, $4.25 million contract.
- December 27 – re-signed left-handed starting pitcher Sean Manaea to a three-year, $75 million contract.

==== 2025 ====
- January 15 – claimed right-handed relief pitcher Austin Warren off waivers from the San Francisco Giants.
- January 17 – re-signed outfielder Jesse Winker to a one-year, $8 million contract. The Mets also signed left-handed relief pitcher A. J. Minter to a two-year, $22 million contract including an opt-out after the 2025 season.
- January 29 – re-signed right-handed relief pitcher Ryne Stanek to a one-year, $4.5 million contract.
- February 5 – re-signed first baseman Pete Alonso to a two-year, $54 million contract including an opt-out after the 2025 season.
- February 12 – re-signed right-handed relief pitcher Drew Smith to a one-year, $1 million contract including a club option for 2026 worth $2 million.
- February 24 – acquired outfielder Alexander Canario from the Chicago Cubs in exchange for cash considerations.

== Regular season ==
=== March–April ===
The Mets started off the season by losing a series against the Houston Astros. After splitting the first two games against the Miami Marlins, the Mets won six games in a row. However, on April 9, that streak ended with a 5–0 shutout loss to the Marlins. The Mets then proceeded to win a series against the Athletics in West Sacramento. However, while the Mets took the opener against the Minnesota Twins, they lost the next two games on April 15–16, losing back-to-back games for the first time all year and losing their second series of the year. Their record dropped to 11–7 as a result. The Mets followed this up with their first perfect home stand of at least seven games since 2015, to improve their record to 18–7, which was tied for their second best start in franchise history. Following this perfect homestand, however, the Mets traveled on the road to take on the Washington Nationals. The Mets were forced to settle for a split after they allowed two significant comebacks by Washington in their two losses, blowing ninth inning leads in both games. However, on April 30 and May 1, the Mets lose a series at home to the Arizona Diamondbacks, dropping consecutive home games for the first time in the regular season since July 27–28, 2024.

=== May ===
Following the Mets series loss, the Mets won their first game on the road against the St. Louis Cardinals, but got swept in a doubleheader on May 4 after the May 3 game got postponed. The Mets improved to 28–15 by May 13, following a series win against the Diamondbacks, Chicago Cubs, and Pittsburgh Pirates. However, beginning on May 14, the Mets hit a rough stretch. By May 20, following a loss to the Boston Red Sox, the Mets lost 3 in a row, the last MLB team to do so. The Mets were able to avoid getting swept, however, after a 5–1 win against Boston on May 21. However, the Mets suffered a brutal loss to the Los Angeles Dodgers on May 23. After completing a comeback from down 5–2 in the 9th inning to tie the game at 5–5, the Mets went 0-for-10 with runners in scoring position in extra innings and lost to the Dodgers 7–5, in 13 innings. After this loss, the Mets had lost six of their last eight, dating back to their May 14 loss against Pittsburgh. The Mets recovered from their tough stretch to win 4 straight games, reaching a record of 34–21 on May 27, matching their then-season high of 13 games above .500. However, on May 28, in the series finale against the Chicago White Sox, the Mets lost 9–4. The Mets finished May and begun June with a sweep of the Colorado Rockies, to improve to 37–22.

=== June ===
The Mets split their road series against the Dodgers. In their finale on June 5, the Mets were in position to win as they had a 5–3 lead in the bottom of the 8th inning, however, the Dodgers rallied for three runs giving them a 6–5 lead, resulting the Mets to salvage a split. However, the Mets won their next six games in a row, and by June 12, had established a 5.5 game division lead on their rival Philadelphia Phillies. They also had the best record in baseball at this point at 45–24. However, starting pitcher Kodai Senga, who had a 1.47 ERA up to that point, suffered a significant hamstring strain in that game, eventually going on the injured list. In their next game, against the Tampa Bay Rays, the Mets had a 5–1 lead after the 5th inning, but blew the lead in the 6th and lost 7–5. The Mets got swept by the Rays, getting swept for the first time all season. The Mets then got swept by their rival Atlanta Braves, leading to a six-game losing streak. On June 20, the Mets lost their seventh game in a row after a 10–2 loss to the Phillies. This defeat also caused the Mets to lose their NL East title. The Mets split their next two games against Philadelphia, still resulting in a series loss. The Mets then lost their next two games at home against the Braves. In the second game on June 24, the Mets had a 3–0 lead after five innings, but squandered it and lost 7–4. That game also became the hottest Mets home game since 2001, with a first-pitch temperature of 98 °F (37 °C). However, the Mets earned a series split against the Braves by winning their next two games. However, in their June 26 victory, pitcher Griffin Canning tore his Achilles, ending his season. The Mets then proceeded to have their worst series in franchise history against the Pirates, getting swept and outscored 30–4, to the end the month.

=== July ===
After their July 1 game was postponed, the Mets lost their first game the next day against the Milwaukee Brewers 7–2, going 3–14 in their last 17 games. However, they won the night game 7–3 to split the doubleheader. The Mets won their July 3 game against Milwaukee as well, to earn their first series win in three weeks. The Mets then won the Subway Series against the New York Yankees from July 4–5 to win their second series in a row. On July 8, after trailing 6–2 to the Baltimore Orioles after seven innings, the Mets tied the game in the top of the 8th and eventually won 7–6, to improve their season record to 53–39. However, after another rainout on July 9, the Mets got swept in their doubleheader on July 10, to lose the series. The Mets proceeded to win two out of three games against the Kansas City Royals before the All-Star break, to have a 55–42 record and be a half game behind the Phillies.

The Mets lost their first two games after the break to the Cincinnati Reds, including losing 5–2 on the day David Wright had his number retired on July 19. The Mets then won their next seven games, to take a 1.5 game lead on the Phillies, and establish a record of 62–44. However, the Mets ended July by getting swept at the hands of the San Diego Padres.

=== August ===
The Mets lost their August 1 game against the San Francisco Giants, surrendering control of the NL East to the Phillies. However, the next day, a Mets win and Phillies loss allowed the Mets to regain control of the NL East. However, a Mets loss the following day to the Giants cost them the NL East, this time for good. This was the start of the Mets second seven-game losing streak, this one culminating in blowing a 5–0 lead to the Brewers. The Mets snapped their losing streak on August 12, as Pete Alonso hit his 253rd home run, the most of any Met in franchise history, winning 13–5. However, on the next day, the Mets suffered an ugly loss to the Braves, surrendering a 6–0 lead by allowing them to score nine runs in the 4th inning. This was the Mets' worst inning since April 2019, and resulted in an 11–6 loss. In addition, the Mets blew a 4+ run lead for the third game in a row, the first time in franchise history. (Note: The Mets blew a 5-1 lead on August 12, but still won 13-5.) The Mets lost their next two games, and by August 15 had gone just 2–14 in their last 16 games after another bullpen collapse. However, on August 16, rookie pitcher Nolan McLean won his debut in a 3–1 victory over the Seattle Mariners to snap the losing streak. The Mets then won the Little League Classic 7–3 on the next day as well, to win consecutive games for the first time since July 27. The Mets lost a series to the Nationals, allowing the Phillies to take a seven-game lead on the NL East while the Reds were within a half game of the final wild card spot on August 21. On August 22, however, McLean became the first pitcher other than David Peterson to complete six innings since June 7. The Mets were able to win four of their next five games to trip the NL East deficit to four by August 27. Their gains were erased after losing three of four games against Miami to end August. The Mets had a record of just 11–17 in August, despite setting franchise records for most runs scored and most home runs in any month.

=== September ===
After a dismal August, the Mets began September by taking two out of three games from the Detroit Tigers. In a September 5 game against the Reds, closer Edwin Díaz loaded the bases with no one out, but struck out two batters and forced a groundout to hang on to a 5–4 victory. Following that win, the Mets lost eight games in a row. On September 13, the Mets briefly fell out of a playoff spot before the Giants lost hours later. On September 14, Pete Alonso hit a walk-off home run in the 10th inning against the Texas Rangers, ending the 8-game losing streak and avoiding a sweep. However, the following day, the Phillies clinched the NL East with their win over the Dodgers. The Mets won their next series against the Padres, allowing the Mets to take a two-game lead on the final Wild Card spot, with a record of 79–74. On September 19, the Mets overcame a 4–1 deficit early on to beat the Nationals 12–6, winning four of their last five games. However, the Mets proceeded to lose that series to the Nationals, and the Reds sweep over the Cubs dropped the Mets out of a playoff spot for the first time since April 5. Both teams had 80–76 records, but Cincinnati owned the tiebreaker.

On September 23, the Mets went to Wrigley Field to play the Cubs and had one of their most critical games of the year. While the Mets fell behind 6–1, they eventually won 9–7 and had their first five-run comeback since May 19, 2023. The Reds loss also allowed the Mets to reclaim their Wild Card spot. The Mets took that series, to maintain a one game lead over Cincinnati heading into the final series of the season. However, on September 26, in their first game in the final series against the Marlins, the Mets squandered a 2–0 lead and ultimately lost 6–2. The Reds won as well, resulting in the Mets losing their playoff spot again. They both won on September 27, and had identical 83–78 records. However, a Mets loss or Reds win on September 28 would eliminate the Mets from the playoffs. While the Reds did lose 4–2 to the Brewers on September 28, the Mets got shut out by the Marlins, losing 4–0. With an 83–79 record, the Mets finished their collapse and were officially eliminated from playoff contention.

=== Transactions ===
==== 2025 ====
- April 25 – re-signed left-handed relief pitcher Brooks Raley to a one-year, $1.85 million contract including a club option for 2026 worth $4.75 million.
- May 15 – acquired left-handed relief pitcher José Castillo from the Arizona Diamondbacks in exchange for cash considerations.
- June 7 – acquired right-handed relief pitcher Justin Garza from the San Francisco Giants in exchange for cash considerations.
- July 25 – acquired left-handed relief pitcher Gregory Soto from the Baltimore Orioles in exchange for minor league prospects Wellington Aracena and Cameron Foster.
- July 30 – acquired right-handed relief pitcher Tyler Rogers from the San Francisco Giants in exchange for outfielder Drew Gilbert and right-handed pitchers Blade Tidwell and José Buttó. The Mets also acquired right-handed relief pitcher Ryan Helsley from the St. Louis Cardinals in exchange for minor league prospects Jesus Baez, Nate Dohm, and Frank Elissalt.
- July 31 – acquired center fielder Cedric Mullins from the Baltimore Orioles in exchange for prospects Raimon Gómez, Chandler Marsh and Anthony Nunez.

== Season standings ==
=== National League East ===
NL East
Team	W	L	Pct.	GB	Home	Road
Philadelphia Phillies	96	66	.593	—	55‍–‍26	41‍–‍40
New York Mets	83	79	.512	13	49‍–‍32	34‍–‍47
Miami Marlins	79	83	.488	17	38‍–‍43	41‍–‍40
Atlanta Braves	76	86	.469	20	39‍–‍42	37‍–‍44
Washington Nationals	66	96	.407	30	32‍–‍49	34‍–‍47

=== National League Wild Card ===
Division leaders
Team	W	L	Pct.
Milwaukee Brewers	97	65	.599
Philadelphia Phillies	96	66	.593
Los Angeles Dodgers	93	69	.574

Wild Card teams (Top 3 teams qualify for postseason)
Team	W	L	Pct.	GB
Chicago Cubs	92	70	.568	+9
San Diego Padres	90	72	.556	+7
Cincinnati Reds	83	79	.512	—
New York Mets	83	79	.512	—
San Francisco Giants	81	81	.500	2
Arizona Diamondbacks	80	82	.494	3
Miami Marlins	79	83	.488	4
St. Louis Cardinals	78	84	.481	5
Atlanta Braves	76	86	.469	7
Pittsburgh Pirates	71	91	.438	12
Washington Nationals	66	96	.407	17
Colorado Rockies	43	119	.265	40

=== Record vs. opponents ===
==== Record vs. National League ====
2025 National League record Source: MLB Standings Grid – 2025
Team	AZ	ATL	CHC	CIN	COL	LAD	MIA	MIL	NYM	PHI	PIT	SD	SF	STL	WSH	AL
Arizona	—	4–2	3–4	2–4	8–5	6–7	3–3	4–3	3–3	3–3	2–4	5–8	7–6	3–3	2–4	25–23
Atlanta	2–4	—	2–4	5–2	4–2	1–5	8–5	2–4	8–5	5–8	2–4	1–6	1–5	4–2	9–4	22–26
Chicago	4–3	4–2	—	5–8	5–1	4–3	4–2	7–6	2–4	2–4	10–3	3–3	1–5	8–5	3–3	30–18
Cincinnati	4–2	2–5	8–5	—	5–1	1–5	3–4	5–8	4–2	3–3	7–6	4–2	3–3	6–7	2–4	26–22
Colorado	5–8	2–4	1–5	1–5	—	2–11	3–3	2–4	0–6	0–7	2–4	3–10	2–11	4–2	4–3	12–36
Los Angeles	7–6	5–1	3–4	5–1	11–2	—	5–1	0–6	3–4	2–4	2–4	9–4	9–4	2–4	3–3	27–21
Miami	3–3	5–8	2–4	4–3	3–3	1–5	—	3–3	7–6	4–9	4–3	3–3	4–2	3–3	7–6	26–22
Milwaukee	3–4	4–2	6–7	8–5	4–2	6–0	3–3	—	4–2	4–2	10–3	2–4	2–5	7–6	6–0	28–20
New York	3–3	5–8	4–2	2–4	6–0	4–3	6–7	2–4	—	7–6	2–4	2–4	4–2	5–2	7–6	24–24
Philadelphia	3–3	8–5	4–2	3–3	7–0	4–2	9–4	2–4	6–7	—	3–3	3–3	3–4	2–4	8–5	31–17
Pittsburgh	4–2	4–2	3–10	6–7	4–2	4–2	3–4	3–10	4–2	3–3	—	1–5	4–2	7–6	4–3	17–31
San Diego	8–5	6–1	3–3	2–4	10–3	4–9	3–3	4–2	4–2	3–3	5–1	—	10–3	4–3	4–2	20–28
San Francisco	6–7	5–1	5–1	3–3	11–2	4–9	2–4	5–2	2–4	4–3	2–4	3–10	—	2–4	3–3	24–24
St. Louis	3–3	2–4	5–8	7–6	2–4	4–2	3–3	6–7	2–5	4–2	6–7	3–4	4–2	—	5–1	22–26
Washington	4–2	4–9	3–3	4–2	3–4	3–3	6–7	0–6	6–7	5–8	3–4	2–4	3–3	1–5	—	19–29

Updated with the results of all games through September 28, 2025.

==== Record vs. American League ====
2025 National League record vs. American League Source: MLB Standings
Team	ATH	BAL	BOS	CWS	CLE	DET	HOU	KC	LAA	MIN	NYY	SEA	TB	TEX	TOR
Arizona	2–1	2–1	2–1	2–1	2–1	0–3	0–3	1–2	1–2	2–1	2–1	3–0	1–2	4–2	1–2
Atlanta	1–2	0–3	3–3	2–1	3–0	3–0	1–2	1–2	1–2	3–0	1–2	1–2	1–2	0–3	1–2
Chicago	3–0	2–1	2–1	5–1	3–0	1–2	1–2	1–2	3–0	1–2	2–1	1–2	2–1	2–1	1–2
Cincinnati	0–3	2–1	1–2	1–2	5–1	2–1	1–2	2–1	2–1	2–1	2–1	1–2	3–0	1–2	1–2
Colorado	1–2	1–2	0–3	1–2	1–2	0–3	2–4	0–3	2–1	2–1	1–2	0–3	1–2	0–3	0–3
Los Angeles	2–1	1–2	1–2	3–0	2–1	3–0	0–3	2–1	0–6	2–1	2–1	3–0	2–1	2–1	2–1
Miami	1–2	2–1	1–2	1–2	1–2	2–1	1–2	2–1	2–1	2–1	3–0	1–2	3–3	3–0	1–2
Milwaukee	2–1	2–1	3–0	2–1	1–2	2–1	2–1	2–1	3–0	4–2	0–3	2–1	1–2	0–3	2–1
New York	2–1	1–2	1–2	2–1	0–3	2–1	1–2	2–1	3–0	1–2	3–3	2–1	0–3	1–2	3–0
Philadelphia	2–1	2–1	2–1	1–2	2–1	2–1	0–3	2–1	1–2	2–1	2–1	3–0	3–0	3–0	4–2
Pittsburgh	2–1	0–3	2–1	0–3	0–3	4–2	1–2	0–3	2–1	1–2	1–2	0–3	1–2	1–2	2–1
San Diego	2–1	0–3	2–1	2–1	3–0	1–2	1–2	2–1	2–1	1–2	1–2	1–5	0–3	2–1	0–3
San Francisco	5–1	2–1	2–1	1–2	1–2	0–3	3–0	1–2	1–2	0–3	2–1	3–0	1–2	2–1	0–3
St. Louis	2–1	2–1	0–3	3–0	3–0	1–2	2–1	3–3	1–2	3–0	0–3	0–3	1–2	1–2	0–3
Washington	1–2	5–1	0–3	1–2	1–2	2–1	1–2	1–2	2–1	2–1	0–3	2–1	0–3	1–2	0–3

Updated with the results of all games through September 28, 2025.

== Game log ==
=== Regular season ===
Legend
Mets Win	Mets Loss	Game Postponed	Eliminated from playoff spot
Bold = Mets team member

2025 Game Log
Overall: 83–79 (Home: 49–32; Away: 34–47)
March/April: 21–10 (Home: 13–2; Away: 8–8)

#	Date	Opponent	Box Score	Win	Loss	Save	Location (Attendance)	Record
1	March 27	@ Astros	1–3	Valdez (1–0)	**Holmes** (0–1)	Hader (1)	Daikin Park (42,305)	0–1
2	March 28	@ Astros	3–1	**Megill** (1–0)	Brown (0–1)	**Díaz** (1)	Daikin Park (37,004)	1–1
3	March 29	@ Astros	1–2	Arrighetti (1–0)	**Canning** (0–1)	Hader (2)	Daikin Park (41,742)	1–2
4	March 31	@ Marlins	10–4	**Peterson** (1–0)	Quantrill (0–1)	—	LoanDepot Park (12,953)	2–2
5	April 1	@ Marlins	2–4	Alcántara (1–0)	**Senga** (0–1)	Bender (1)	LoanDepot Park (13,740)	2–3
6	April 2	@ Marlins	6–5 (11)	**Buttó** (1–0)	Curry (0–1)	**Brazobán** (1)	LoanDepot Park (10,598)	3–3
7	April 4	Blue Jays	5–0	**Megill** (2–0)	Gausman (1–1)	—	**Citi Field** (43,945)	4–3
8	April 5	Blue Jays	3–2	**Díaz** (1–0)	Sandlin (0–1)	—	**Citi Field** (37,694)	5–3
9	April 6	Blue Jays	2–1	**Kranick** (1–0)	Francis (1–1)	**Díaz** (2)	**Citi Field** (40,132)	6–3
10	April 7	Marlins	2–0	**Senga** (1–1)	Bellozo (0–1)	**Stanek** (1)	**Citi Field** (28,630)	7–3
11	April 8	Marlins	10–5	**Holmes** (1–1)	Faucher (0–1)	—	**Citi Field** (28,861)	8–3
12	April 9	Marlins	0–5	Meyer (1–1)	**Megill** (2–1)	—	**Citi Field** (29,232)	8–4
13	April 11	@ Athletics	7–4	**Canning** (1–1)	Sears (1–2)	**Díaz** (3)	Sutter Health Park (9,632)	9–4
14	April 12	@ Athletics	1–3	Ginn (1–0)	**Peterson** (1–1)	Miller (4)	Sutter Health Park (10,133)	9–5
15	April 13	@ Athletics	8–0	**Senga** (2–1)	Severino (0–3)	—	Sutter Health Park (10,036)	10–5
16	April 14	@ Twins	5–1	**Holmes** (2–1)	Topa (0–1)	—	Target Field (10,240)	11–5
17	April 15	@ Twins	3–6	Ober (1–1)	**Megill** (2–2)	Durán (1)	Target Field (12,507)	11–6
18	April 16	@ Twins	3–4 (10)	Sands (2–1)	**Garrett** (0–1)	—	Target Field (19,271)	11–7
19	April 17	Cardinals	4–1	**Canning** (2–1)	Pallante (2–1)	**Díaz** (4)	**Citi Field** (38,246)	12–7
20	April 18	Cardinals	5–4	**Brazobán** (1–0)	Fernandez (0–2)	—	**Citi Field** (39,627)	13–7
21	April 19	Cardinals	3–0	**Senga** (3–1)	Liberatore (1–2)	**Díaz** (5)	**Citi Field** (42,339)	14–7
22	April 20	Cardinals	7–4	**Buttó** (2–0)	Romero (1–2)	—	**Citi Field** (38,347)	15–7
23	April 21	Phillies	5–4	**Megill** (3–2)	Nola (0–5)	**Díaz** (6)	**Citi Field** (35,430)	16–7
24	April 22	Phillies	5–1	**Canning** (3–1)	Sánchez (2–1)	—	**Citi Field** (36,468)	17–7
25	April 23	Phillies	4–3 (10)	**Kranick** (2–0)	Romano (0–1)	—	**Citi Field** (36,863)	18–7
26	April 25	@ Nationals	4–5	López (2–0)	**Stanek** (0–1)	—	Nationals Park (30,277)	18–8
27	April 26	@ Nationals	2–0	**Holmes** (3–1)	Lord (0–3)	**Díaz** (7)	Nationals Park (33,867)	19–8
28	April 27	@ Nationals	7–8	López (3–0)	**Stanek** (0–2)	—	Nationals Park (30,763)	19–9
29	April 28	@ Nationals	19–5	**Canning** (4–1)	Williams (1–3)	**Ureña** (1)	Nationals Park (14,011)	20–9
30	April 29	Diamondbacks	8–3	**Peterson** (2–1)	Rodríguez (1–3)	—	**Citi Field** (35,218)	21–9
31	April 30	Diamondbacks	3–4	Burnes (1–1)	**Stanek** (0–3)	Thompson (1)	**Citi Field** (31,904)	21–10

May: 15–12 (Home: 10–5; Away: 5–7)

#	Date	Opponent	Box Score	Win	Loss	Save	Location (Attendance)	Record
32	May 1	Diamondbacks	2–4	Gallen (2–4)	**Senga** (3–2)	Miller (1)	**Citi Field** (36,239)	21–11
33	May 2	@ Cardinals	9–3	**Holmes** (4–1)	Gray (3–1)	—	Busch Stadium (27,966)	22–11
―	May 3	@ Cardinals	Postponed (rain); rescheduled for May 4					
34	May 4 (1)	@ Cardinals	5–6	Fedde (2–3)	**Tidwell** (0–1)	Helsley (5)	Busch Stadium (37,735)	22–12
35	May 4 (2)	@ Cardinals	4–5	McGreevy (1–0)	**Kranick** (2–1)	—	Busch Stadium (30,313)	22–13
36	May 5	@ Diamondbacks	5–4	**Canning** (5–1)	Nelson (1–1)	**Díaz** (8)	Chase Field (22,674)	23–13
37	May 6	@ Diamondbacks	1–5	Gallen (3–4)	**Peterson** (2–2)	—	Chase Field (24,353)	23–14
38	May 7	@ Diamondbacks	7–1	**Senga** (4–2)	Kelly (3–2)	—	Chase Field (25,729)	24–14
39	May 9	Cubs	7–2	**Holmes** (5–1)	Taillon (2–2)	—	**Citi Field** (41,243)	25–14
40	May 10	Cubs	5–6	Horton (1–0)	**Megill** (3–3)	Hodge (2)	**Citi Field** (41,423)	25–15
41	May 11	Cubs	6–2	**Stanek** (1–3)	Hodge (2–1)	—	**Citi Field** (41,673)	26–15
42	May 12	Pirates	4–3	**Brazobán** (2–0)	Bednar (0–4)	—	**Citi Field** (35,580)	27–15
43	May 13	Pirates	2–1	**Kranick** (3–1)	Keller (1–5)	**Díaz** (9)	**Citi Field** (35,926)	28–15
44	May 14	Pirates	0–4	Shugart (2–3)	**Holmes** (5–2)	—	**Citi Field** (34,473)	28–16
45	May 16	@ Yankees	2–6	Rodón (5–3)	**Megill** (3–4)	Weaver (5)	Yankee Stadium (47,700)	28–17
46	May 17	@ Yankees	3–2	**Garrett** (1–1)	Cruz (1–2)	**Díaz** (10)	Yankee Stadium (47,510)	29–17
47	May 18	@ Yankees	2–8	Williams (2–2)	**Stanek** (1–4)	—	Yankee Stadium (48,028)	29–18
48	May 19	@ Red Sox	1–3	Wilson (2–0)	**Senga** (4–3)	Chapman (7)	Fenway Park (33,548)	29–19
49	May 20	@ Red Sox	0–2	Whitlock (2–0)	**Holmes** (5–3)	Chapman (8)	Fenway Park (33,208)	29–20
50	May 21	@ Red Sox	5–1	**Brazobán** (3–0)	Hendriks (0–1)	—	Fenway Park (31,661)	30–20
51	May 23	Dodgers	5–7 (13)	García (2–0)	**Brazobán** (3–1)	—	**Citi Field** (40,449)	30–21
52	May 24	Dodgers	5–2	**Peterson** (3–2)	Gonsolin (2–1)	**Díaz** (11)	**Citi Field** (41,332)	31–21
53	May 25	Dodgers	3–1	**Senga** (5–3)	Knack (2–2)	**Garrett** (1)	**Citi Field** (41,917)	32–21
54	May 26	White Sox	2–1	**Díaz** (2–0)	Wilson (1–1)	—	**Citi Field** (39,938)	33–21
55	May 27	White Sox	6–4	**Megill** (4–4)	Cannon (2–6)	**Garrett** (2)	**Citi Field** (34,944)	34–21
56	May 28	White Sox	4–9	Eisert (2–0)	**Canning** (5–2)	—	**Citi Field** (34,021)	34–22
57	May 30	Rockies	4–2	**Peterson** (4–2)	Freeland (0–8)	**Díaz** (12)	**Citi Field** (41,270)	35–22
58	May 31	Rockies	8–2	**Senga** (6–3)	Senzatela (1–10)	—	**Citi Field** (41,861)	36–22

June: 12–15 (Home: 6–5; Away: 6–10)

#	Date	Opponent	Box Score	Win	Loss	Save	Location (Attendance)	Record
59	June 1	Rockies	5–3	**Holmes** (6–3)	Palmquist (0–4)	**Díaz** (13)	**Citi Field** (43,224)	37–22
60	June 2	@ Dodgers	4–3 (10)	**Díaz** (3–0)	Scott (0–2)	**Buttó** (1)	Dodger Stadium (48,556)	38–22
61	June 3	@ Dodgers	5–6 (10)	Scott (1–2)	**Buttó** (2–1)	—	Dodger Stadium (53,424)	38–23
62	June 4	@ Dodgers	6–1	**Canning** (6–2)	Gonsolin (3–2)	—	Dodger Stadium (45,733)	39–23
63	June 5	@ Dodgers	5–6	Vesia (2–0)	**Garrett** (1–2)	Scott (11)	Dodger Stadium (46,364)	39–24
64	June 6	@ Rockies	4–2	**Stanek** (2–4)	Agnos (0–2)	**Díaz** (14)	Coors Field (34,890)	40–24
65	June 7	@ Rockies	8–1	**Holmes** (7–3)	Márquez (2–8)	—	Coors Field (38,279)	41–24
66	June 8	@ Rockies	13–5	**Megill** (5–4)	Dollander (2–6)	**Blackburn** (1)	Coors Field (40,548)	42–24
67	June 10	Nationals	5–4 (10)	**Garrett** (2–2)	Henry (0–1)	—	**Citi Field** (38,472)	43–24
68	June 11	Nationals	5–0	**Peterson** (5–2)	Irvin (5–3)	—	**Citi Field** (40,681)	44–24
69	June 12	Nationals	4–3	**Senga** (7–3)	Soroka (3–4)	**Díaz** (15)	**Citi Field** (39,779)	45–24
70	June 13	Rays	5–7	Orze (1–0)	**Kranick** (3–2)	Fairbanks (13)	**Citi Field** (41,622)	45–25
71	June 14	Rays	4–8	Rasmussen (6–4)	**Megill** (5–5)	—	**Citi Field** (41,662)	45–26
72	June 15	Rays	0–9	Baz (6–3)	**Canning** (6–3)	—	**Citi Field** (42,804)	45–27
73	June 17	@ Braves	4–5 (10)	Iglesias (4–5)	**Brazobán** (3–2)	—	Truist Park (36,791)	45–28
74	June 18	@ Braves	0–5	Sale (5–4)	**Blackburn** (0–1)	—	Truist Park (39,926)	45–29
75	June 19	@ Braves	1–7	Strider (2–5)	**Holmes** (7–4)	—	Truist Park (39,234)	45–30
76	June 20	@ Phillies	2–10	Banks (2–0)	**Garrett** (2–3)	—	Citizens Bank Park (44,432)	45–31
77	June 21	@ Phillies	11–4	**Canning** (7–3)	Abel (2–1)	—	Citizens Bank Park (44,687)	46–31
78	June 22	@ Phillies	1–7	Luzardo (7–3)	**Peterson** (5–3)	—	Citizens Bank Park (42,155)	46–32
79	June 23	Braves	2–3	Schwellenbach (6–4)	**Blackburn** (0–2)	Lee (2)	**Citi Field** (38,593)	46–33
80	June 24	Braves	4–7	Strider (3–5)	**Castillo** (0–2)	Iglesias (9)	**Citi Field** (38,130)	46–34
81	June 25	Braves	7–3	**Holmes** (8–4)	Fuentes (0–2)	**Díaz** (16)	**Citi Field** (38,275)	47–34
82	June 26	Braves	4–0	**Warren** (1–0)	Holmes (4–7)	—	**Citi Field** (42,646)	48–34
83	June 27	@ Pirates	1–9	Keller (2–10)	**Peterson** (5–4)	—	PNC Park (29,055)	48–35
84	June 28	@ Pirates	2–9	Ashcraft (2–0)	**Blackburn** (0–3)	—	PNC Park (30,649)	48–36
85	June 29	@ Pirates	1–12	Mlodzinski (2–5)	**Montas** (0–1)	—	PNC Park (24,898)	48–37

July: 14–10 (Home: 8–4; Away: 6–6)

#	Date	Opponent	Box Score	Win	Loss	Save	Location (Attendance)	Record
―	July 1	Brewers	Postponed (rain); rescheduled for July 2					
86	July 2 (1)	Brewers	2–7	Peralta (9–4)	**Garrett** (2–4)	—	**Citi Field** (36,335)	48–38
87	July 2 (2)	Brewers	7–3	**Tidwell** (1–1)	Misiorowski (3–1)	**Díaz** (17)	**Citi Field** (41,123)	49–38
88	July 3	Brewers	3–2	**Peterson** (6–4)	Quintana (6–3)	**Díaz** (18)	**Citi Field** (42,241)	50–38
89	July 4	Yankees	6–5	**Brazobán** (4–2)	Weaver (1–3)	**Garrett** (3)	**Citi Field** (41,216)	51–38
90	July 5	Yankees	12–6	**Montas** (1–1)	Rodón (9–6)	—	**Citi Field** (41,401)	52–38
91	July 6	Yankees	4–6	Fried (11–2)	**Pop** (0–1)	Williams (12)	**Citi Field** (41,117)	52–39
92	July 8	@ Orioles	7–6 (10)	**Díaz** (4–0)	Canó (1–5)	**Brazobán** (2)	Camden Yards (35,200)	53–39
―	July 9	@ Orioles	Postponed (rain); rescheduled for July 10					
93	July 10 (1)	@ Orioles	1–3	Wolfram (1–0)	**Stanek** (2–5)	Bautista (18)	Camden Yards (25,262)	53–40
94	July 10 (2)	@ Orioles	3–7	Sugano (7–5)	**Hagenman** (0–1)	—	Camden Yards (17,961)	53–41
95	July 11	@ Royals	8–3	**Brazobán** (5–2)	Cruz (2–1)	—	Kauffman Stadium (28,268)	54–41
96	July 12	@ Royals	3–1	**Montas** (2–1)	Bowlan (1–2)	**Díaz** (19)	Kauffman Stadium (24,620)	55–41
97	July 13	@ Royals	2–3	Estévez (4–2)	**Manaea** (0–1)	—	Kauffman Stadium (22,121)	55–42
**95th All-Star Game in Cumberland, Georgia**
98	July 18	Reds	4–8	Lodolo (7–6)	**Carrillo** (0–1)	—	**Citi Field** (42,390)	55–43
99	July 19	Reds	2–5	Martinez (8–9)	**Holmes** (8–5)	Pagán (21)	**Citi Field** (42,605)	55–44
100	July 20	Reds	3–2	**Díaz** (5–0)	Suter (1–1)	**Stanek** (2)	**Citi Field** (42,981)	56–44
101	July 21	Angels	7–5	**Raley** (1–0)	Fermín (2–1)	**Díaz** (20)	**Citi Field** (41,442)	57–44
102	July 22	Angels	3–2	**Montas** (3–1)	Hendricks (5–7)	**Stanek** (3)	**Citi Field** (43,055)	58–44
103	July 23	Angels	6–3	**Manaea** (1–1)	Eder (0–1)	**Díaz** (21)	**Citi Field** (41,591)	59–44
104	July 25	@ Giants	8–1	**Holmes** (9–5)	Webb (9–8)	—	Oracle Park (41,163)	60–44
105	July 26	@ Giants	2–1	**Peterson** (7–4)	Ray (9–5)	**Díaz** (22)	Oracle Park (39,029)	61–44
106	July 27	@ Giants	5–3	**Buttó** (3–1)	Rodríguez (3–2)	**Díaz** (23)	Oracle Park (40,124)	62–44
107	July 28	@ Padres	6–7	Suárez (3–4)	**Soto** (0–3)	—	Petco Park (43,596)	62–45
108	July 29	@ Padres	1–7	Peralta (5–1)	**Buttó** (3–2)	—	Petco Park (45,088)	62–46
109	July 30	@ Padres	0–5	Darvish (1–3)	**Holmes** (9–6)	—	Petco Park (42,627)	62–47

August: 11–17 (Home: 8–11; Away: 3–6)

#	Date	Opponent	Box Score	Win	Loss	Save	Location (Attendance)	Record
110	August 1	Giants	3–4 (10)	Walker (3–4)	**Díaz** (5–1)	Rodríguez (2)	**Citi Field** (42,777)	62–48
111	August 2	Giants	12–6	**Garrett** (3–4)	Teng (0–1)	—	**Citi Field** (43,455)	63–48
112	August 3	Giants	4–12	Whisenhunt (1–0)	**Montas** (3–2)	—	**Citi Field** (42,876)	63–49
113	August 4	Guardians	6–7 (10)	Smith (4–4)	**Helsley** (3–2)	Enright (1)	**Citi Field** (37,886)	63–50
114	August 5	Guardians	2–3	Festa (3–2)	**Rogers** (4–4)	Smith (4)	**Citi Field** (39,895)	63–51
115	August 6	Guardians	1–4	Williams (7–4)	**Peterson** (7–5)	Gaddis (2)	**Citi Field** (40,072)	63–52
116	August 8	@ Brewers	2–3	Woodruff (4–0)	**Senga** (7–4)	Megill (27)	American Family Field (43,469)	63–53
117	August 9	@ Brewers	4–7	Koenig (4–1)	**Stanek** (2–6)	Megill (28)	American Family Field (40,156)	63–54
118	August 10	@ Brewers	6–7	Mears (3–3)	**Díaz** (5–2)	—	American Family Field (42,461)	63–55
119	August 12	Braves	13–5	**Soto** (1–3)	Strider (5–10)	**Hagenman** (1)	**Citi Field** (39,748)	64–55
120	August 13	Braves	6–11	Bummer (2–2)	**Garrett** (3–5)	—	**Citi Field** (38,647)	64–56
121	August 14	Braves	3–4	Elder (5–9)	**Helsley** (3–3)	Iglesias (17)	**Citi Field** (41,782)	64–57
122	August 15	Mariners	9–11	Ferguson (3–2)	**Helsley** (3–4)	Muñoz (29)	**Citi Field** (41,200)	64–58
123	August 16	Mariners	3–1	**McLean** (1–0)	Woo (10–7)	**Díaz** (24)	**Citi Field** (42,978)	65–58
124	August 17*	Mariners	7–3	**Holmes** (10–6)	Kirby (8–6)	—	Bowman Field (2,518)	66–58
125	August 19	@ Nationals	8–1	**Peterson** (8–5)	Irvin (8–8)	—	Nationals Park (23,989)	67–58
126	August 20	@ Nationals	4–5	Lord (4–6)	**Senga** (7–5)	Ferrer (3)	Nationals Park (19,565)	67–59
127	August 21	@ Nationals	3–9	Rutledge (2–2)	**Manaea** (1–2)	Ferrer (4)	Nationals Park (20,127)	67–60
128	August 22	@ Braves	12–7	**McLean** (2–0)	Wentz (4–4)	—	Truist Park (40,076)	68–60
129	August 23	@ Braves	9–2	**Holmes** (11–6)	Quantrill (4–11)	—	Truist Park (39,738)	69–60
130	August 24	@ Braves	3–4	Kinley (2–3)	**Soto** (1–4)	Iglesias (22)	Truist Park (34,393)	69–61
131	August 25	Phillies	13–3	**Castillo** (1–2)	Sánchez (11–5)	—	**Citi Field** (41,983)	70–61
132	August 26	Phillies	6–5	**Díaz** (6–2)	Durán (6–6)	—	**Citi Field** (41,914)	71–61
133	August 27	Phillies	6–0	**McLean** (3–0)	Walker (4–7)	—	**Citi Field** (41,893)	72–61
134	August 28	Marlins	4–7	Gibson (3–5)	**Soto** (1–5)	Faucher (13)	**Citi Field** (37,975)	72–62
135	August 29	Marlins	19–9	**Tong** (1–0)	Pérez (6–4)	—	**Citi Field** (42,112)	73–62
136	August 30	Marlins	8–11	Faucher (4–4)	**Rogers** (4–5)	Phillips (3)	**Citi Field** (42,726)	73–63
137	August 31	Marlins	1–5	Alcántara (8–11)	**Senga** (7–6)	—	**Citi Field** (43,302)	73–64
*August 17 game played at Bowman Field in Williamsport, Pennsylvania

September: 10–15 (Home: 4–5; Away: 6–10)

#	Date	Opponent	Box Score	Win	Loss	Save	Location (Attendance)	Record
138	September 1	@ Tigers	10–8	**Stanek** (3–6)	Sommers (0–1)	**Díaz** (25)	Comerica Park (38,912)	74–64
139	September 2	@ Tigers	12–5	**McLean** (4–0)	Gipson-Long (0–2)	—	Comerica Park (24,733)	75–64
140	September 3	@ Tigers	2–6	Mize (13–5)	**Holmes** (11–7)	—	Comerica Park (21,775)	75–65
141	September 5	@ Reds	5–4	**Peterson** (9–5)	Abbott (8–6)	**Díaz** (26)	Great American Ball Park (21,231)	76–65
142	September 6	@ Reds	3–6	Singer (13–9)	**Tong** (1–1)	—	Great American Ball Park (26,782)	76–66
143	September 7	@ Reds	2–3	Greene (6–4)	**Sproat** (0–1)	Santillan (5)	Great American Ball Park (25,662)	76–67
144	September 8	@ Phillies	0–1	Nola (4–8)	**McLean** (4–1)	Durán (28)	Citizens Bank Park (40,388)	76–68
145	September 9	@ Phillies	3–9	Suárez (12–6)	**Manaea** (1–3)	—	Citizens Bank Park (41,609)	76–69
146	September 10	@ Phillies	3–11	Sánchez (13–5)	**Holmes** (11–8)	—	Citizens Bank Park (38,090)	76–70
147	September 11	@ Phillies	4–6	Luzardo (14–6)	**Garrett** (3–6)	Durán (29)	Citizens Bank Park (40,098)	76–71
148	September 12	Rangers	3–8	deGrom (12–7)	**Tong** (1–2)	—	**Citi Field** (41,040)	76–72
149	September 13	Rangers	2–3	Maton (4–5)	**Díaz** (6–3)	Armstrong (9)	**Citi Field** (41,752)	76–73
150	September 14	Rangers	5–2 (10)	**Stanek** (4–6)	Curvelo (1–1)	—	**Citi Field** (40,024)	77–73
151	September 16	Padres	8–3	**Manaea** (2–3)	King (4–3)	—	**Citi Field** (41,819)	78–73
152	September 17	Padres	4–7	Morejón (12–5)	**Peterson** (9–6)	Suárez (39)	**Citi Field** (41,783)	78–74
153	September 18	Padres	6–1	**Tong** (2–2)	Vásquez (5–7)	—	**Citi Field** (38,127)	79–74
154	September 19	Nationals	12–6	**Raley** (2–0)	Alvarez (1–1)	—	**Citi Field** (39,484)	80–74
155	September 20	Nationals	3–5 (11)	Lao (1–0)	**Rogers** (4–6)	Poulin (1)	**Citi Field** (43,412)	80–75
156	September 21	Nationals	2–3	Irvin (9–13)	**Manaea** (2–4)	Parker (1)	**Citi Field** (42,960)	80–76
157	September 23	@ Cubs	9–7	**Raley** (3–0)	Thiebar (3–4)	**Díaz** (27)	Wrigley Field (35,729)	81–76
158	September 24	@ Cubs	3–10	Boyd (14–8)	**Tong** (2–3)	Civale (1)	Wrigley Field (35,060)	81–77
159	September 25	@ Cubs	8–5	**McLean** (5–1)	Imanaga (9–8)	**Díaz** (28)	Wrigley Field (38,465)	82–77
160	September 26	@ Marlins	2–6	Alcántara (11–12)	**Sproat** (0–2)	Phillips (4)	LoanDepot Park (34,196)	82–78
161	September 27	@ Marlins	5–0	**Holmes** (12–8)	Pérez (7–6)	—	LoanDepot Park (35,609)	83–78
162	September 28	@ Marlins	0–4	Cabrera (8–7)	**Raley** (3–1)	—	LoanDepot Park (34,660)	83–79

== Roster ==
2025 New York Mets
Roster
Pitchers: 52 Ty Adcock; 58 Paul Blackburn; 43 Huascar Brazobán; 70 José Buttó; 92 Génesis Cabrera; 46 Griffin Canning; 84 Alex Carrillo; 54 José Castillo; 49 Chris Devenski; 39 Edwin Díaz; 50 Rico Garcia; 75 Reed Garrett; 71 Justin Garza; 51 Justin Hagenman; 53 Dom Hamel; 56 Ryan Helsley; 57 Kevin Herget; 35 Clay Holmes; 32 Max Kranick; 57,58 Richard Lovelady; 59 Sean Manaea; 26 Nolan McLean; 38 Tylor Megill; 33 A. J. Minter; 47 Frankie Montas; 72 Dedniel Núñez; 23 David Peterson; 91 Jonathan Pintaro; 83 Colin Poche; 56 Zach Pop; 25 Brooks Raley; 71 Tyler Rogers; 34 Kodai Senga; 65 Gregory Soto; 40 Brandon Sproat; 55 Ryne Stanek; 40 Blade Tidwell; 21 Jonah Tong; 54 José Ureña; 82 Brandon Waddell; 44 Austin Warren; 81 Danny Young; 53 Tyler Zuber	Catchers: 4 Francisco Álvarez; 30 Hayden Senger; 13 Luis Torrens; Infielders: 2 Luisangel Acuña; 20 Pete Alonso; 7 Brett Baty; 12 Francisco Lindor; 10 Ronny Mauricio; 1 Jeff McNeil; 27 Mark Vientos	Outfielders: 28 José Azócar; 21 Travis Jankowski; 6 Starling Marte; 28 Cedric Mullins; 9 Brandon Nimmo; 19 Jose Siri; 22 Juan Soto; 15 Tyrone Taylor; 3 Jesse Winker; 29 Jared Young	Manager: 64 Carlos Mendoza; Coaches: 79 Danny Barnes (strategy coach); 60 Jeremy Barnes (hitting); 61 Eric Chavez (hitting); 76 Desi Druschel (assistant pitching); 80 Rafael Fernandez (batting practice pitcher); 68 John Gibbons (bench); 95 Jeremy Hefner (pitching); 78 Eric Langill (bullpen catcher); 77 Dave Racaniello (bullpen catcher); 66 Antoan Richardson (first base); 67 José Rosado (bullpen); 88 Mike Sarbaugh (third base); 63 Glenn Sherlock (catching)

== Player statistics ==
Updated as of 28 September 2025

=== Batting ===
= Indicates team leader in category (Note: To qualify as a team leader in AVG, OBP, SLG, or OPS, a player must have 3.1 plate appearances per team game.)

= Indicates league leader

Note: G = Games played; AB = At bats; R = Runs; H = Hits; 2B = Doubles; 3B = Triples; HR = Home runs; RBI = Runs batted in; SB = Stolen bases; CS = Caught stealing; BB = Walks; SO = Strikeouts; AVG = Batting average; OBP = On-base percentage; SLG = Slugging percentage; OPS = On-base plus slugging

Player	G	AB	R	H	2B	3B	HR	RBI	SB	CS	BB	SO	AVG	OBP	SLG	OPS
Luis Torrens	92	261	20	59	14	1	5	29	1	0	19	56	.226	.284	.345	.629
Pete Alonso	162	624	87	170	41	1	38	126	1	2	61	162	.272	.347	.524	.871
Jeff McNeil	122	399	42	97	21	5	12	54	3	0	49	55	.243	.335	.411	.746
Francisco Lindor	160	644	117	172	35	0	31	86	31	6	65	131	.267	.346	.466	.811
Brett Baty	130	393	53	100	13	2	18	50	8	0	33	108	.254	.313	.435	.748
Brandon Nimmo	155	587	81	154	27	0	25	92	13	1	50	141	.262	.324	.436	.760
Tyrone Taylor	113	310	34	69	18	3	2	27	12	2	16	76	.223	.279	.319	.598
Juan Soto	160	577	120	152	20	1	43	105	38	4	127	137	.263	.396	.525	.921
Starling Marte	98	293	37	79	14	0	9	34	7	2	22	68	.270	.335	.410	.745
Mark Vientos	121	424	44	99	21	2	17	61	1	0	30	115	.233	.289	.413	.702
Francisco Álvarez	76	246	32	63	12	1	11	32	0	0	27	73	.256	.339	.447	.787
Luisangel Acuña	95	175	30	41	7	0	0	8	16	1	13	37	.234	.293	.274	.567
Ronny Mauricio	61	168	19	38	6	0	6	10	4	0	15	54	.226	.293	.369	.663
Cedric Mullins	42	121	16	22	4	1	2	10	8	0	16	35	.182	.284	.281	.565
Jesse Winker	26	70	8	16	5	2	1	10	1	0	9	21	.229	.309	.400	.709
Hayden Senger	33	72	8	13	1	0	0	4	0	0	3	22	.181	.221	.194	.415
Jared Young	22	43	5	8	1	0	4	6	0	0	2	16	.186	.234	.488	.722
Jose Siri	16	32	7	2	2	0	0	1	2	0	4	17	.063	.167	.125	.292
José Azócar	12	18	5	5	0	0	0	1	1	0	2	1	.278	.350	.278	.628
Travis Jankowski	4	0	1	0	0	0	0	0	0	0	0	0	.000	.000	.000	.000
Ryne Stanek	1	0	0	0	0	0	0	0	0	0	0	0	.000	.000	.000	.000
Edwin Díaz	1	0	0	0	0	0	0	0	0	0	0	0	.000	.000	.000	.000
Team totals	162	5457	766	1359	262	19	224	746	147	18	563	1325	.249	.326	.427	.753
Rank in 15 NL teams	—	8	6	8	7	11	2	6	3	15	4	9	7	4	5	4

Source: Baseball Reference

=== Pitching ===
= Indicates team leader in category (Note: To qualify as a team leader in ERA or WHIP, a player must have 1.0 IP per team game.)

Note: W = Wins; L = Losses; ERA = Earned run average; G = Games pitched; GS = Games started; SV = Saves; IP = Innings pitched; H = Hits allowed; R = Runs allowed; ER = Earned runs allowed; HR = Home runs allowed; BB = Walks allowed (bases on balls); SO = Strikeouts; HBP = Hit by pitch; WHIP = Walks + hits per inning pitched

Player	W	L	ERA	G	GS	SV	IP	H	R	ER	HR	BB	SO	HBP	WHIP
David Peterson	9	6	4.22	30	30	0	168.2	166	84	79	11	65	150	7	1.370
Clay Holmes	12	8	3.53	33	31	0	165.2	150	74	65	14	66	129	13	1.304
Kodai Senga	7	6	3.02	22	22	0	113.1	94	44	38	12	55	109	3	1.315
Griffin Canning	7	3	3.77	16	16	0	76.1	70	35	32	8	35	70	0	1.376
Tylor Megill	5	5	3.95	14	14	0	68.1	60	37	30	6	33	89	7	1.361
Sean Manaea	2	4	5.64	15	12	0	60.2	62	38	38	13	12	75	7	1.220
Edwin Díaz	6	3	1.63	62	0	28	66.1	37	14	12	4	21	98	8	0.874
Huascar Brazobán	5	2	3.57	52	3	2	63.0	51	29	25	6	27	57	4	1.238
Ryne Stanek	4	6	5.30	65	0	3	56.0	56	39	33	7	32	58	0	1.571
Reed Garrett	3	6	3.90	58	1	3	55.1	47	27	24	5	26	64	1	1.319
José Butto	3	2	3.64	34	0	1	47.0	43	21	19	2	22	41	1	1.383
Nolan McLean	5	1	2.06	8	8	0	48.0	34	13	11	4	16	57	2	1.042
Frankie Montas	3	2	6.28	9	7	0	38.2	48	29	27	8	14	32	1	1.603
Max Kranick	3	2	3.65	24	0	0	37.0	34	15	15	5	5	25	0	1.054
Brandon Waddell	0	0	3.45	11	1	0	31.1	29	12	12	4	11	22	1	1.277
Tyler Rogers	0	3	2.30	28	0	0	27.1	27	9	7	1	3	10	1	1.098
Brooks Raley	3	1	2.45	30	0	0	25.2	14	7	7	0	6	25	2	0.779
Gregory Soto	1	3	4.50	25	0	0	24.0	33	16	12	2	6	26	6	1.625
Paul Blackburn	0	3	6.85	7	4	1	23.2	31	19	18	3	8	18	1	1.648
Justin Hagenman	0	1	4.56	9	1	1	23.2	24	13	12	4	2	23	1	1.099
Brandon Sproat	0	2	4.79	4	4	0	20.2	18	11	11	0	7	17	2	1.210
Ryan Helsley	0	3	7.20	22	0	0	20.0	25	20	16	4	11	22	0	1.800
Jonah Tong	2	3	7.71	5	5	0	18.2	24	20	16	3	9	22	0	1.768
Chris Devenski	0	0	2.16	13	1	0	16.2	10	4	4	1	5	14	2	0.900
José Castillo	1	1	2.35	16	0	0	15.1	21	6	4	0	6	19	4	1.761
Blade Tidwell	1	1	9.00	4	2	0	15.0	23	15	15	4	10	10	1	2.200
Rico Garcia	0	0	2.13	8	0	0	12.2	7	3	3	1	2	16	0	0.711
Kevin Herget	0	0	3.00	6	0	0	12.0	11	5	4	0	3	6	0	1.167
A. J. Minter	0	0	1.64	13	0	0	11.0	6	2	2	0	5	14	0	1.000
Richard Lovelady	0	0	6.30	8	0	0	10.0	10	8	7	3	4	9	1	1.400
Dedniel Núñez	0	0	4.66	10	0	0	9.2	6	5	5	1	6	11	0	1.241
Austin Warren	1	0	0.96	5	0	0	9.1	5	1	1	1	4	9	0	0.964
Danny Young	0	0	4.32	10	0	0	8.1	9	5	4	0	3	13	1	1.440
Génesis Cabrera	0	0	3.52	6	0	0	7.2	7	3	3	1	3	7	0	1.304
Justin Garza	0	0	5.40	5	0	0	6.2	8	4	4	1	1	3	0	1.350
Alex Carrillo	0	1	13.50	3	0	0	4.2	6	7	7	4	2	4	1	1.714
José Ureña	0	0	15.00	1	0	1	3.0	7	5	5	2	1	3	0	2.667
Ty Adcock	0	0	3.00	3	0	0	3.0	2	1	1	1	2	5	0	1.333
Tyler Zuber	0	0	9.00	1	0	0	2.0	3	2	2	0	0	3	0	1.500
Zach Pop	0	1	20.25	1	0	0	1.1	5	3	3	1	0	0	0	3.750
Dom Hamel	0	0	0.00	1	0	0	1.0	3	0	0	0	0	0	1	3.000
Travis Jankowski	0	0	18.00	1	0	0	1.0	2	2	2	0	1	0	1	3.000
Colin Poche	0	0	27.00	1	0	0	0.2	2	2	2	0	2	1	0	6.000
Jonathan Pintaro	0	0	27.00	1	0	0	0.2	2	2	2	0	2	1	0	6.000
Luis Torrens	0	0	54.00	2	0	0	0.2	5	4	4	2	1	0	0	9.000
Jared Young	0	0	0.00	1	0	0	0.1	1	0	0	0	1	0	0	6.000
Team totals	83	79	4.04	162	162	40	1432.0	1338	715	643	149	556	1387	80	1.323
Rank in 15 NL teams	7	6	9	—	—	10	12	9	7	7	2	3	15	2	13

Source: Baseball Reference

== Farm system ==
Level	Team	League	Manager
AAA	Syracuse Mets	International League	Dick Scott
AA	Binghamton Rumble Ponies	Eastern League	Reid Brignac
High-A	Brooklyn Cyclones	South Atlantic League	Gilbert Gómez
Low-A	St. Lucie Mets	Florida State League	Luis Rivera
Rookie	FCL Mets	Florida Complex League	Lino Díaz
Rookie	DSL Mets Orange	Dominican Summer League	J.C. Rodriguez
Rookie	DSL Mets Blue	Dominican Summer League	Félix Fermín
