= Luis Torrens =

Venezuelan baseball player (born 1996)

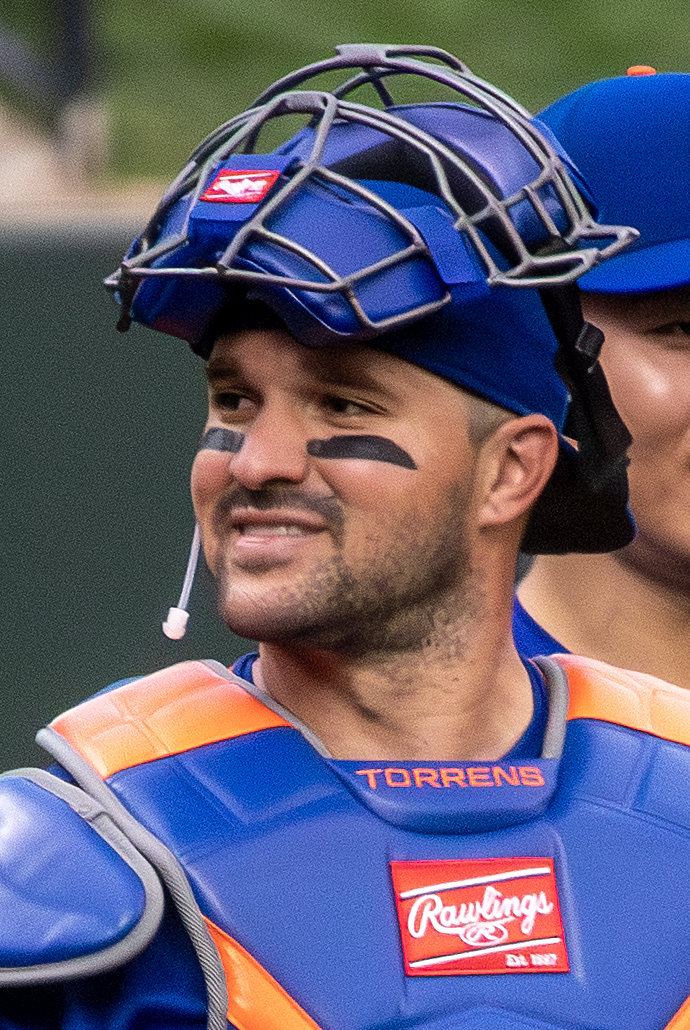
- Torrens with the Mets in 2026

New York Mets – No. 13
- Catcher
- Born: May 2, 1996 (age 30); Valencia, Venezuela
- Bats: Right Throws: Right

MLB debut
- April 3, 2017, for the San Diego Padres

MLB statistics (through 2026 season)
- Batting average: .228
- Home runs: 36
- Runs batted in: 164
- Stats at Baseball Reference

Teams
- San Diego Padres (2017, 2019–2020); Seattle Mariners (2020–2022); Chicago Cubs (2023); Seattle Mariners (2023); New York Mets (2024–present)

Luis Alfonso Torrens Sáez (born May 2, 1996) is a Venezuelan professional baseball catcher for the New York Mets of Major League Baseball (MLB). He has previously played in MLB for the San Diego Padres, Seattle Mariners, and Chicago Cubs. He made his MLB debut in 2017.

== Career ==
=== New York Yankees ===
Torrens signed with the New York Yankees as an international free agent on July 2, 2012. He made his professional debut in 2013 for the Gulf Coast League Yankees. In 2014, he played for the Charleston RiverDogs, Gulf Coast Yankees and Staten Island Yankees.

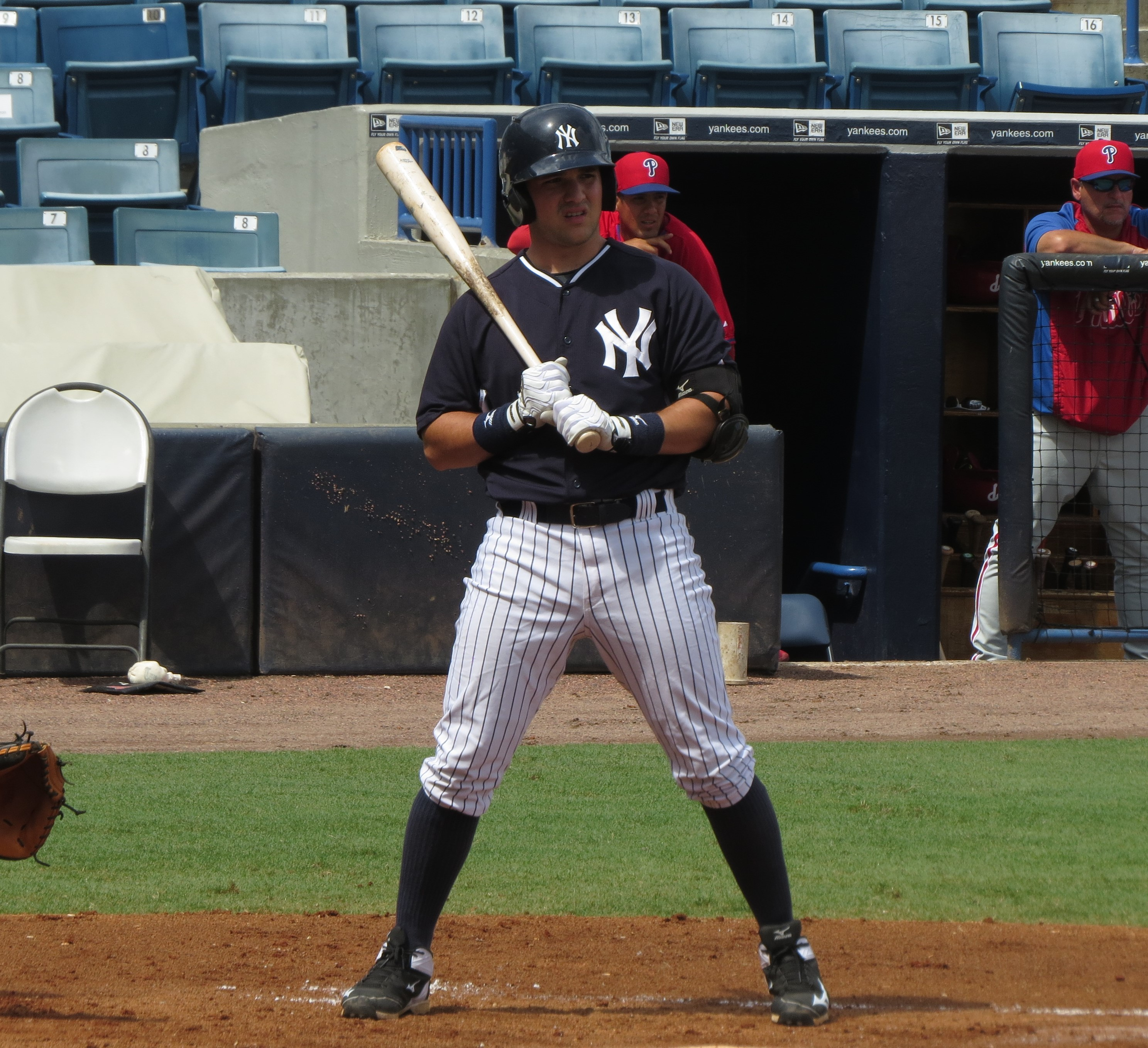
Torrens in 2015

In March 2015, Torrens had surgery to repair a torn labrum in his right shoulder, which ended his 2015 season. He returned from the injury in 2016 and played in 52 games with Staten Island and Charleston.

=== San Diego Padres ===
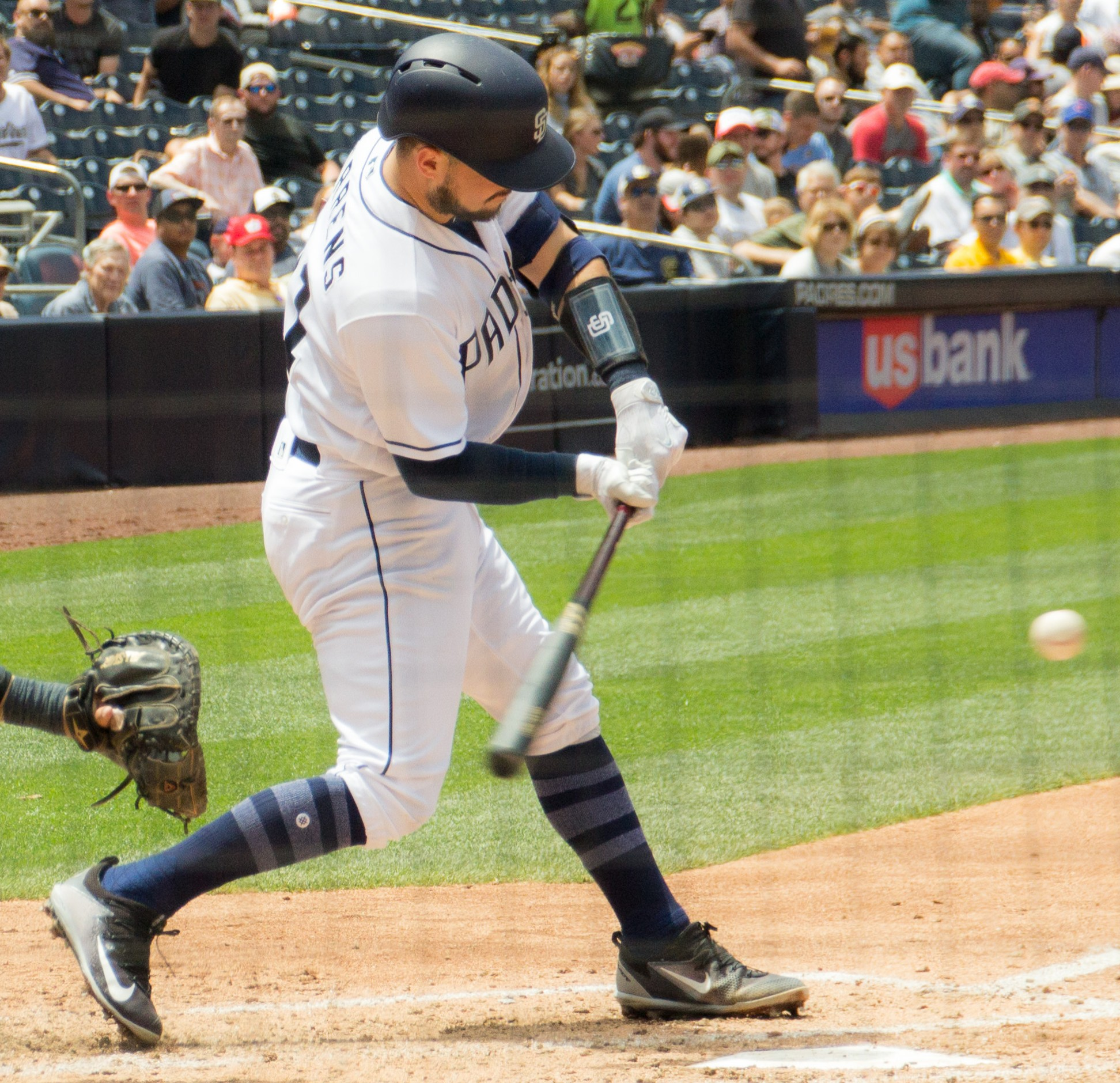
Torrens with the Padres in 2017

In the 2016 Rule 5 draft, the Cincinnati Reds selected Torrens from the Yankees. Immediately after taking Torrens, the Reds traded him to the San Diego Padres. Torrens joined the Padres' Opening Day roster as a 20-year-old, never having played above single-A. Torrens, along with Héctor Sánchez, served as a back-up to catcher Austin Hedges during the 2017 season. He started 31 games for the Padres overall, but saw less time as the season progressed, making only 6 starts and 29 plate appearances over the final two months of the season. Torrens finished 2017 with 20 hits in 123 at-bats, including 3 doubles and a triple.

Torrens played for the Navegantes del Magallanes in the Venezuelan Winter League in the MLB offseason. During spring training in 2018, Torrens battled an oblique injury, and then was optioned to the San Antonio Missions of the Double-A Texas League on March 14. Torrens played for the Amarillo Sod Poodles of the Texas League in 2019, and was promoted to the major leagues on September 16.

=== Seattle Mariners ===
On August 30, 2020, the Padres traded Torrens, Taylor Trammell, Ty France, and Andrés Muñoz to the Seattle Mariners for Austin Nola, Austin Adams, and Dan Altavilla. In 2020, between the two teams, on defense he led all major league catchers in passed balls, with six. In 2021, Torrens batted .243/.299/.431 with 15 home runs and 47 runs batted in (RBIs) in 108 games.

The Mariners designated Torrens for assignment on August 11, 2022. After he cleared waivers, the Mariners sent him outright to the Triple-A Tacoma Rainiers. He batted .279 in 16 games for Tacoma and was promoted to the major leagues on September 21.

On October 4, Torrens recorded the 6th pitching win by a position player since 1960. He pitched the top of the 10th inning, giving up one hit and no earned runs against the Detroit Tigers. On November 18, Torrens was non-tendered and became a free agent.

=== Chicago Cubs ===
On January 25, 2023, Torrens signed a minor league contract with the Chicago Cubs organization. He made Cubs major league roster when the 2023 season began. Torrens made 13 appearances for the Cubs, going 5-for-20 with 3 RBIs. He was designated for assignment on April 28.

=== Baltimore Orioles ===
On May 3, 2023, Torrens was traded to the Baltimore Orioles in exchange for cash considerations. He was designated for assignment without making an appearance for Baltimore on May 9. On May 14, Torrens cleared waivers and was assigned outright to the Triple-A Norfolk Tides. However, Torrens rejected the outrighted assignment and instead elected free agency.

=== Washington Nationals ===
On May 18, 2023, Torrens signed a minor league contract with the Washington Nationals organization. He has played in 19 games for the Triple–A Rochester Red Wings, hitting .258/.311/.470 with 3 home runs and 13 RBIs. He opted out of his minor league contract and became a free agent on July 1.

=== Seattle Mariners (second stint) ===
On August 30, 2023, Torrens signed a minor league contract with the Seattle Mariners organization. After 5 games with the Triple–A Tacoma Rainiers, on September 12, the Mariners selected Torrens' contract, adding him to the major league roster. In 5 games for Seattle, he went 2–for–8 (.250) with no home runs and one RBI. Following the season on October 31, Torrens was removed from the 40–man roster and sent outright to Triple–A Tacoma. However, Torrens rejected the assignment and elected free agency on November 3.

=== New York Yankees (second stint) ===
On January 24, 2024, Torrens signed a minor league contract with the New York Yankees. In 30 games for the Triple–A Scranton/Wilkes-Barre RailRiders, Torrens hit .279/.339/.469 with five home runs and 19 RBIs.

=== New York Mets ===
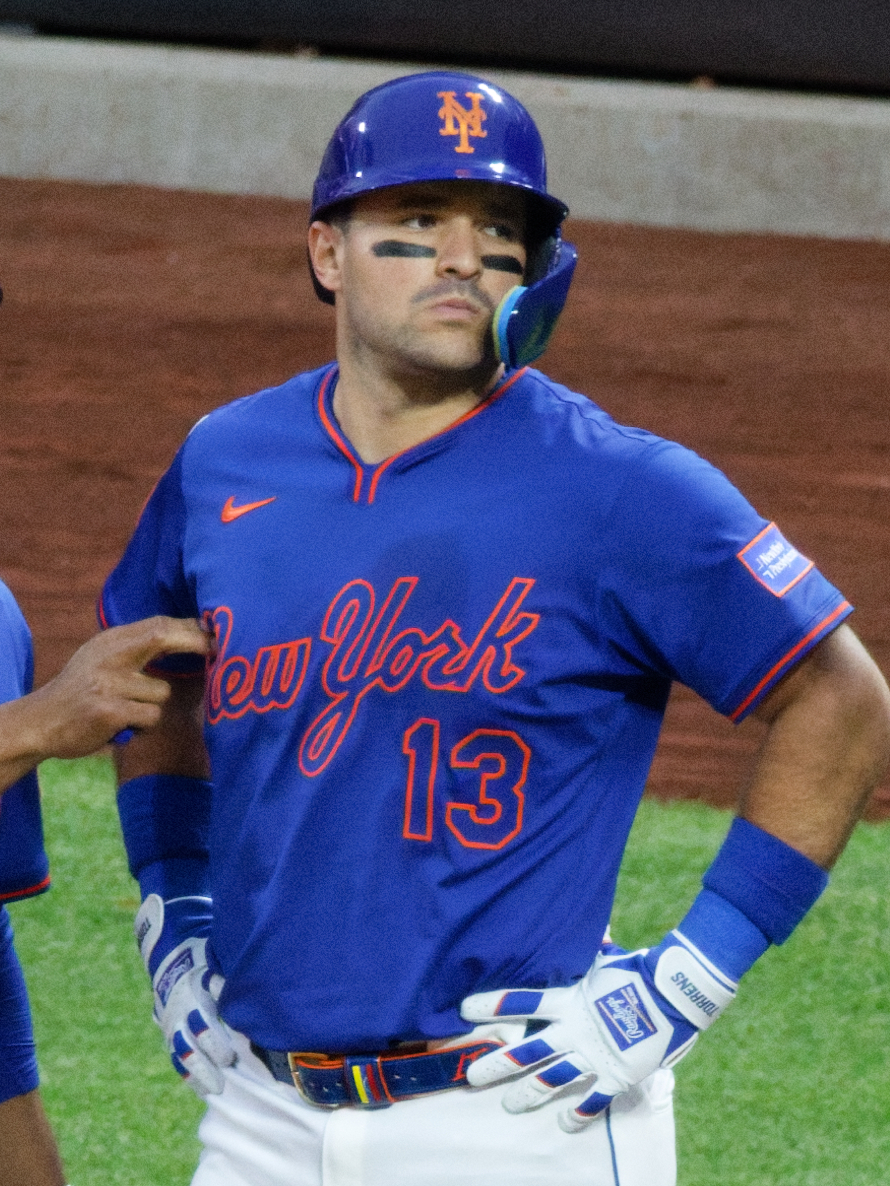
Luis Torrens at first base, June 26, 2025

On May 31, 2024, the Yankees traded Torrens to the New York Mets in exchange for cash considerations. He was then subsequently added to the team's major league roster. On June 5, Torrens hit two home runs in a 9–1 victory against the Washington Nationals, the first multi-homer game of his career. He turned the first ever game-ending 2–3 double play in MLB history to preserve a 6–5 win against the Philadelphia Phillies in the MLB London Series on June 9. Torrens played in 48 games for the Mets in 2024, batting .229/.292/.373 with three home runs and 15 RBI.

Francisco Álvarez, the Mets' starting catcher, began the 2025 season on the injured list and Torrens filled in as his replacement, along with Hayden Senger. He was named as a Gold Glove finalist following the season. Torrens made 92 appearances for the Mets during the regular season, slashing .226/.284/.345 with five home runs, 29 RBI, and one stolen base.

On May 2, 2026, Torrens and the Mets agreed to a two-year, $11.5 million contract extension.

== See also ==
- List of Major League Baseball players from Venezuela
- Rule 5 draft results
