= Carlos Mendoza (baseball manager) =

Venezuelan baseball coach and manager (born 1979)

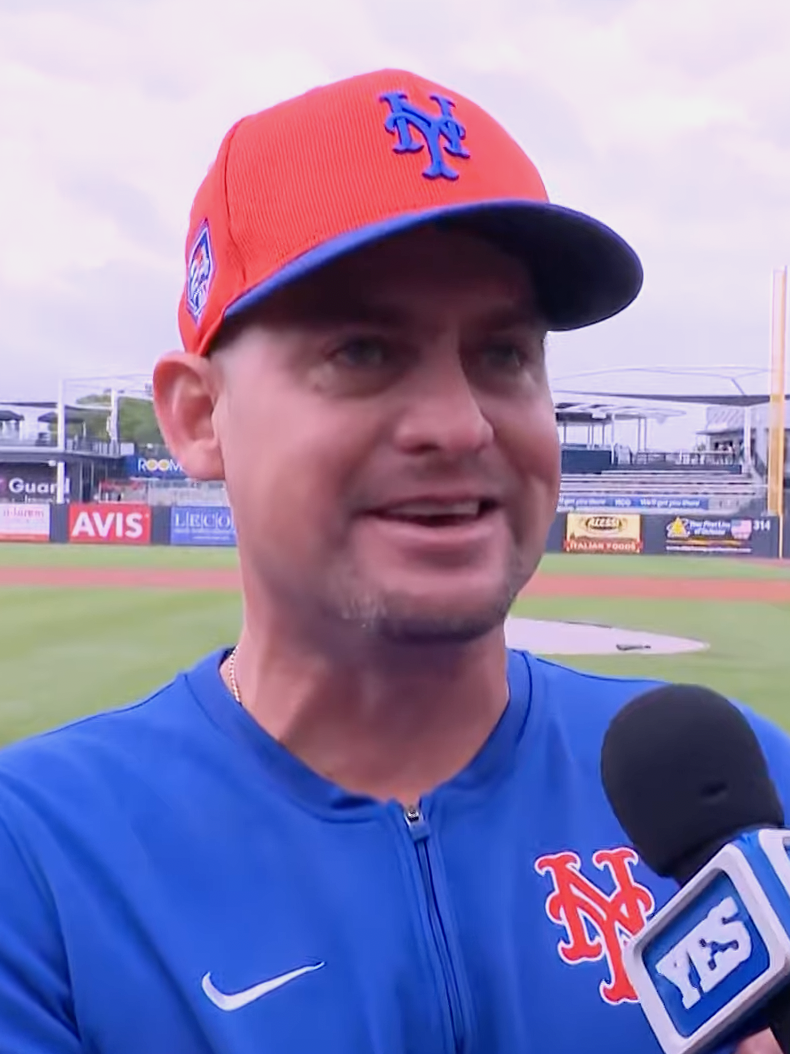
- Mendoza with the Mets in 2024

Philadelphia Phillies
- Manager
- Born: November 27, 1979 (age 46); Barquisimeto, Venezuela
- Batted: Switch Threw: Right

Career statistics (through June 25, 2026)
- Managerial record: 206–199
- Winning %: .509
- Stats at Baseball Reference
- Managerial record at Baseball Reference

Teams
- As manager: New York Mets (2024–2026); As coach: New York Yankees (2018–2023)

Carlos Enrique Mendoza (born November 27, 1979) is a Venezuelan professional baseball coach and manager who is the third base coach for the Philadelphia Phillies of Major League Baseball (MLB). He previously served as the manager of the New York Mets from 2024 to 2026. He has also served as a bench coach for the New York Yankees.

== Early life and playing career ==
Mendoza was born, raised and attended college in Venezuela. He signed as a free agent with the San Francisco Giants and also played for the New York Yankees organization as a utility infielder. Mendoza played in Minor League Baseball for 13 seasons.

== Coaching career ==
=== New York Yankees ===
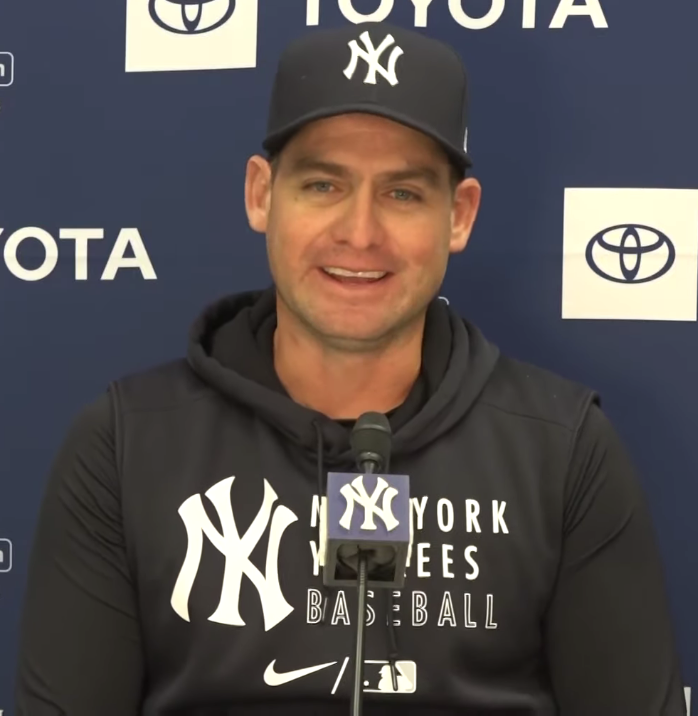
Mendoza with the Yankees in 2021

Mendoza became a member of the Staten Island Yankees coaching staff in 2009 before joining the Charleston RiverDogs in 2010. During the 2011 campaign, he served as the manager of the Gulf Coast League Yankees. He then returned to the RiverDogs as their manager before the 2012 season. He became a roving defensive instructor in the Yankees' organization after the 2012 season.

After the 2017 season, the Yankees promoted Mendoza to their major league coaching staff as an infield coach. On November 11, 2019, he was named the bench coach of the Yankees, replacing Josh Bard.

On June 6, 2021, Mendoza was ejected for the first time in his MLB career by second base umpire Bill Miller despite not saying a word. He was likely confused with hitting coach Marcus Thames who was the one arguing. The game also saw fellow Yankees coach Phil Nevin ejected by home plate umpire Gabe Morales in the previous inning.

=== New York Mets ===
On November 13, 2023, Mendoza was named the manager of the New York Mets. He signed a three-year contract with a club option for a fourth year. On July 12, 2024, Mendoza was ejected from a game against the Colorado Rockies after arguing with home plate umpire Jeremie Rehak following a strike 3 call on Jose Iglesias, his first ejection as a manager. He was also ejected on September 27 in a game against the Milwaukee Brewers by umpire Ramon De Jesus for arguing a strike-three call on Francisco Álvarez.

On September 30, the Mets clinched a playoff spot, making Mendoza the first manager in Mets history to make the postseason in his first season, as a rookie manager. After defeating the Milwaukee Brewers in the Wild Card Series and the Philadelphia Phillies in the Division Series, the Mets season ended after a 10–5 loss to the Los Angeles Dodgers in Game 6 of the National League Championship Series.

On November 11, 2024, Mendoza was named a finalist for NL Manager of the Year for his successful turnaround of the Mets. He finished in third place, behind winner Pat Murphy of the Milwaukee Brewers and second-place finisher Mike Shildt of the San Diego Padres.

The Mets had an 83–79 (.512) during the 2025 season and missed the postseason. Mendoza received criticism for his handling of the bullpen by former Mets reliever Adam Ottavino. There were also reports of problems in the team clubhouse, including between Francisco Lindor and Juan Soto and between Lindor and Jeff McNeil, which Mendoza denied. The Mets retained Mendoza for the 2026 season.

On June 26, 2026, the Mets fired Mendoza after a 34–47 (.420) start to the year and in the midst of a six-game losing streak, including a game where they made six defensive errors. The Mets' Senior Vice President for Player Development Andy Green was named as the interim manager.

=== Philadelphia Phillies ===
After the 2026 season, the Philadelphia Phillies hired Mendoza to serve as their third base coach.

=== Managerial record ===
As of June 25, 2026

Team	Year	Regular season					Postseason			
Team	Year	Games	Won	Lost	Win %	Finish	Won	Lost	Win %	Result
NYM	2024	162	89	73	.549	3rd in NL East	7	6	.538	Lost NLCS (LAD)
NYM	2025	162	83	79	.512	2nd in NL East	–	–	–	–
NYM	2026	81	34	47	.420	(fired)	–	–	–	–
Total		405	206	199	.509		7	6	.538	

== Personal life ==
Mendoza is married to Francis Mendoza, and has two sons, Adrian and Andres.
