= Dom Hamel =

American baseball player (born 1999)

New York Yankees
- Pitcher
- Born: March 2, 1999 (age 27); Chandler, Arizona, U.S.
- Bats: Right Throws: Right

MLB debut
- September 17, 2025, for the New York Mets

MLB statistics (through 2025 season)
- Win–loss record: 0–0
- Earned run average: 0.00
- Strikeouts: 0
- Stats at Baseball Reference

Teams
- New York Mets (2025)

Dominic Avery Hamel (born March 2, 1999) is an American professional baseball pitcher in the New York Yankees organization. He has previously played in Major League Baseball (MLB) for the New York Mets.

== Playing career ==
=== New York Mets ===
Hamel attended Hamilton High School in Chandler, Arizona, and played college baseball at Yavapai College and Dallas Baptist University. He was drafted by the New York Mets in the third round (81st overall) of the 2021 Major League Baseball draft.

Hamel made his professional debut with the Florida Complex League Mets. He started 2022 with the St. Lucie Mets before being promoted to the Brooklyn Cyclones. In 2023, Hamel had an 8–6 record with a 3.85 ERA for the Double-A Binghamton Rumble Ponies. He led the Mets minor leagues in strikeouts (160, 7 ahead of Blade Tidwell) and was third in wins. Hamel tied for 6th in the Eastern League in wins and was second in strikeouts. He opened 2024 with the Triple-A Syracuse Mets.

Hamel made 22 appearances (eight starts) for Triple-A Syracuse to begin the 2025 season, posting a 4-5 record and 4.73 ERA with 59 strikeouts. On August 4, 2025, Hamel was selected to the 40-man roster and promoted to the major leagues for the first time. He would be sent back down to Triple-A Syracuse on August 6, briefly becoming a phantom ballplayer. Hamel was recalled for a second time to the major leagues on September 13. He made his MLB debut on September 17 against the San Diego Padres, pitching one inning and allowing three hits in a 4–7 loss. With Hamel's debut, the Mets set a new record of most pitchers ever used in one season by a major league team with 46.

=== New York Yankees ===
On September 20, 2025, Hamel was claimed off waivers by the Baltimore Orioles. Hamel did not appear for the organization before he was designated for assignment on September 25, when the team acquired Carson Ragsdale. On September 27, Hamel was claimed off waivers by the Texas Rangers.

On January 20, 2026, Hamel was designated for assignment by the Rangers following the signing of Jakob Junis. On January 27, Hamel was claimed off waivers by the New York Yankees. He was designated for assignment by the Yankees on February 4. Hamel cleared waivers and was sent outright to the Triple-A Scranton/Wilkes-Barre RailRiders on February 9. In 26 games (24 starts) between Triple-A and Double-A he threw 112 innings going 3-12 with a 7.07 ERA and 98 strikeouts.
