= Alex Carrillo =

American baseball player (born 1997)

Baltimore Orioles
- Pitcher
- Born: June 6, 1997 (age 29); Paramount, California, U.S.
- Bats: Right Throws: Right

MLB debut
- July 8, 2025, for the New York Mets

MLB statistics (through 2025 season)
- Win–loss record: 0–1
- Earned run average: 13.50
- Strikeouts: 4
- Stats at Baseball Reference

Teams
- New York Mets (2025)

Alejandro Carrillo (born June 6, 1997) is an American professional baseball pitcher in the Baltimore Orioles organization. He has previously played in Major League Baseball (MLB) for the New York Mets.

== Career ==
=== Texas Rangers ===
Carrillo is from West Covina, California. He attended Faulkner University and signed with the Texas Rangers organization as an undrafted free agent on August 16, 2019. He made his professional debut with the rookie-level Arizona League Rangers, striking out six across three scoreless appearances.

Carrillo did not play in a game in 2020 due to the cancellation of the minor league season because of the COVID-19 pandemic. He was released by the Rangers organization on June 1, 2020.

=== New York Boulders ===
On June 29, 2020, Carrillo signed with the Pericos de Puebla of the Mexican League, but did not make an appearance for the team after the season was cancelled as a result of the COVID-19 pandemic.

On January 21, 2021, Carrillo signed with the New York Boulders for their inaugural season in the Frontier League; in 14 appearances for the team, he recorded a 7.11 ERA with 15 strikeouts over 19 innings.

=== Tigres de Quintana Roo ===
On April 21, 2022, Carrillo signed with the Tigres de Quintana Roo of the Mexican League. In 21 appearances on the year, he struggled to a 1-2 record and 8.49 ERA with 40 strikeouts across 29 2/3 innings pitched.

Carrillo made 22 appearances out of the bullpen for Quintana Roo in 2023, registering a 1-0 record and 8.06 ERA with 29 strikeouts and one save over 22 1/3 innings of work.

=== Washington Wild Things ===
On April 1, 2024, Carrillo signed with the Washington Wild Things of the Frontier League. In 35 relief appearances for the Wild Things, Carrillo compiled a 3-1 record and 3.31 ERA with 49 strikeouts and one save across 35 1/3 innings pitched.

=== New York Mets ===
On November 14, 2024, Carrillo signed a minor league contract with the New York Mets organization. He began the year with the Double-A Binghamton Rumble Ponies, and logged a 2-1 record and 4.19 ERA with 30 strikeouts over 15 appearances.

On June 22, 2025, Carrillo was promoted to the Triple-A Syracuse Mets. After four scoreless appearances for Syracuse, on July 8, it was announced that Carrillo would be promoted to the major leagues for the first time. He was formally selected to the team's 40-man and active rosters later that day. In his MLB debut, Carrillo pitched 1^{1}/_{3} innings and gave up a home run to Jackson Holliday in the Mets comeback 7–6 win in 10 innings over the Baltimore Orioles at Camden Yards. He made three appearances for New York during his rookie campaign, registering an 0-1 record and 13.50 ERA with four strikeouts across 4 2/3 innings pitched.

Carrillo was optioned to Triple-A Syracuse to begin the 2026 season. In 21 appearances for Syracuse, he logged a 1–2 record and 5.57 ERA with 31 strikeouts over 21 innings of work. On July 7, 2026, Carrillo was designated for assignment by the Mets. He cleared waivers and was released by New York on July 9.

=== San Francisco Giants ===
On July 14, 2026, Carrillo signed a minor league contract with the San Francisco Giants. In 15 games with Triple-A Sacramento River Cats he threw 15 innings of relief going 2-4 with a 7.80 ERA and 20 strikeouts. He elected free agency on November 2.

=== Baltimore Orioles ===
On November 18, 2026, Carrillo signed a minor league contract with the Baltimore Orioles.
