= Drew Gilbert =

American baseball player (born 2000)

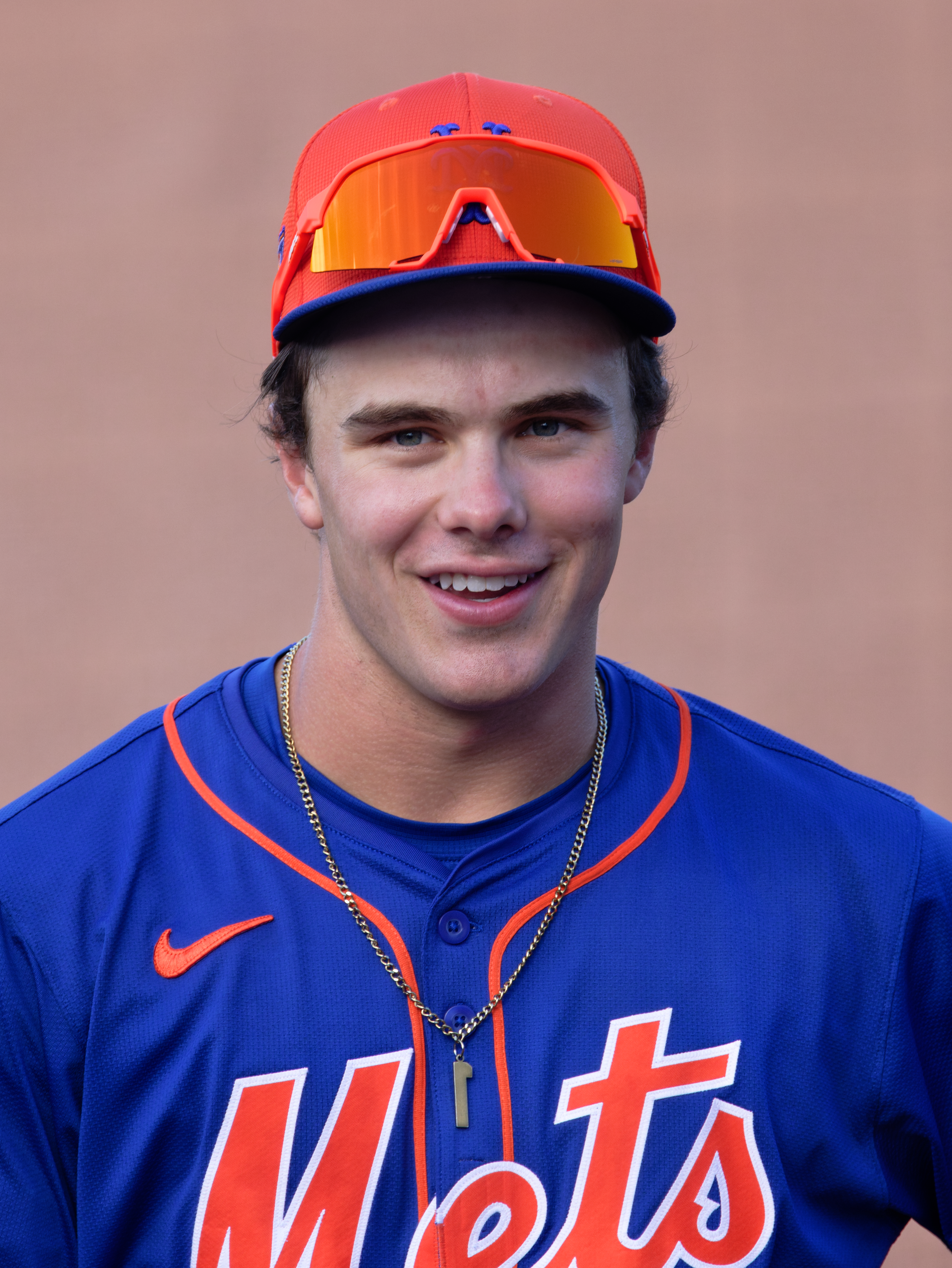
- Gilbert with the Mets in 2024

San Francisco Giants – No. 0
- Outfielder
- Born: September 27, 2000 (age 26); St. Paul, Minnesota, U.S.
- Bats: Left Throws: Left

MLB debut
- August 8, 2025, for the San Francisco Giants

MLB statistics (through 2026 season)
- Batting average: .227
- Home runs: 14
- Runs batted in: 56
- Stats at Baseball Reference

Teams
- San Francisco Giants (2025–present)

Andrew Christopher Gilbert (born September 27, 2000) is an American professional baseball outfielder for the San Francisco Giants of Major League Baseball (MLB). He played college baseball for the Tennessee Volunteers.

== Amateur career ==
Gilbert attended Stillwater Area High School in Stillwater, Minnesota. As a junior, he helped lead Stillwater to their first state championship since 1991, striking out 15 batters and throwing over 115 pitches in a complete-game shutout. He finished his junior year with a .400 batting average alongside going 7–1 with a 0.63 ERA and 100 strikeouts over 55 2/3 innings as a pitcher. As a senior in 2019, he was named the St. Paul Pioneer Press Baseball Player of the Year, the Star Tribune Metro Player of the Year, and Minnesota Mr. Baseball. He finished his senior year with 97 strikeouts while giving up only one run over 49 innings alongside batting .370 with eight stolen bases. He was selected by the Minnesota Twins in the 35th round of the 2019 Major League Baseball draft but did not sign. He originally committed to play college baseball for the Oregon State Beavers, but switched his commitment to the Tennessee Volunteers after a coaching change at Oregon State during the summer before his freshman year of college.

During his freshman year at Tennessee in 2020, Gilbert pitched eight innings and made ten starts in the outfield before the season was cancelled due to the COVID-19 pandemic. As a sophomore in 2021, Gilbert became Tennessee's starting center fielder. He was named Southeastern Conference (SEC) Newcomer of the Week twice during the season. He garnered national attention after he hit a walk-off grand slam versus the Wright State Raiders in the first round of the 2021 NCAA Division I baseball tournament, leading the Volunteers to a 9–8 win. He was subsequently named the Most Outstanding Player of the Knoxville Regional after hitting a home run in all three games of the regional, helping Tennessee reach their first Super Regional in 16 years. He finished the season having started 67 games with a slash line of .274/.341/.437 with ten home runs, 62 runs batted in (RBI), and ten stolen bases. Gilbert was named to the USA Baseball National Collegiate Team after the season alongside teammate Blade Tidwell.

Gilbert returned as Tennessee's starting center fielder in 2022 and was named to the All SEC-First Team. During Tennessee's first game of the Super Regional versus the Notre Dame Fighting Irish, Gilbert was ejected and subsequently suspended one game for arguing a strike call. He returned for the third and final game of the Super Regional, but Tennessee lost, thus ending their season. Gilbert finished the season having appeared in 58 games, compiling a slash line of .362/.455/.673 with 11 home runs, 70 RBI, and 21 doubles.

== Professional career ==
=== Houston Astros ===
The Houston Astros selected Gilbert in the first round, with the 28th overall selection, in the 2022 Major League Baseball draft. He signed with the team for $2.5 million.

Gilbert made his professional debut with the Rookie-level Florida Complex League Astros, homering in his first at-bat. After four games, he was promoted to the Single-A Fayetteville Woodpeckers. His season ended in August after he dislocated his right elbow after a collision in the outfield. Over ten games for the season, he hit .313 with two home runs. To open the 2023 season, he was assigned to the High-A Asheville Tourists. In early May, he was promoted to the Double-A Corpus Christi Hooks. He was selected to represent the Astros at the 2023 All-Star Futures Game.

=== New York Mets ===
On August 1, 2023, Gilbert and Ryan Clifford were traded to the New York Mets in exchange for Justin Verlander. He was subsequently assigned to the Double-A Binghamton Rumble Ponies. Over 116 total appearances for the 2023 season, Gilbert slashed .289/.381/.487 with 18 home runs and 59 RBI.

Gilbert began the 2024 season with the Triple-A Syracuse Mets. He missed time during the season due to a hamstring injury, and spent time rehabbing with the Rookie-level Florida Complex League Mets and Single-A St. Lucie Mets. Over 62 games for the season, Gilbert hit .205 with ten home runs and 33 RBI. Gilbert began the 2025 season on the injured list with lingering hamstring issues, but was activated in mid-April, rehabbed with St. Lucie, and was then assigned to Syracuse.

=== San Francisco Giants ===
On July 30, 2025, the Mets traded Gilbert, José Buttó, and Blade Tidwell to the San Francisco Giants in exchange for pitcher Tyler Rogers. In five appearances for the Triple-A Sacramento River Cats, he went 7-for-14 (.500) with two RBI, two stolen bases, and six walks.

On August 8, 2025, the Giants selected Gilbert's contract and promoted him to the major leagues for the first time. He made his MLB debut that night at Oracle Park as the Giants' starting right fielder, going 0-for-4. Gilbert recorded his first MLB hit on August 11, a single off Yu Darvish of the San Diego Padres. On August 17, Gilbert hit his first MLB home run off of Mason Englert in a 7–1 victory against the Tampa Bay Rays. Gilbert played in 39 games for the Giants during his rookie campaign and hit .190 with three home runs and 13 RBI.

Gilbert was optioned to Sacramento to begin the 2026 season. He was recalled by the Giants on April 15. Gilbert played the remainder of the season with the Giants following his initial promotion, and ended the season with a .238 batting average, 11 home runs, and 43 RBI across 134 games.
