= José Buttó =

Venezuelan baseball player (born 1998)

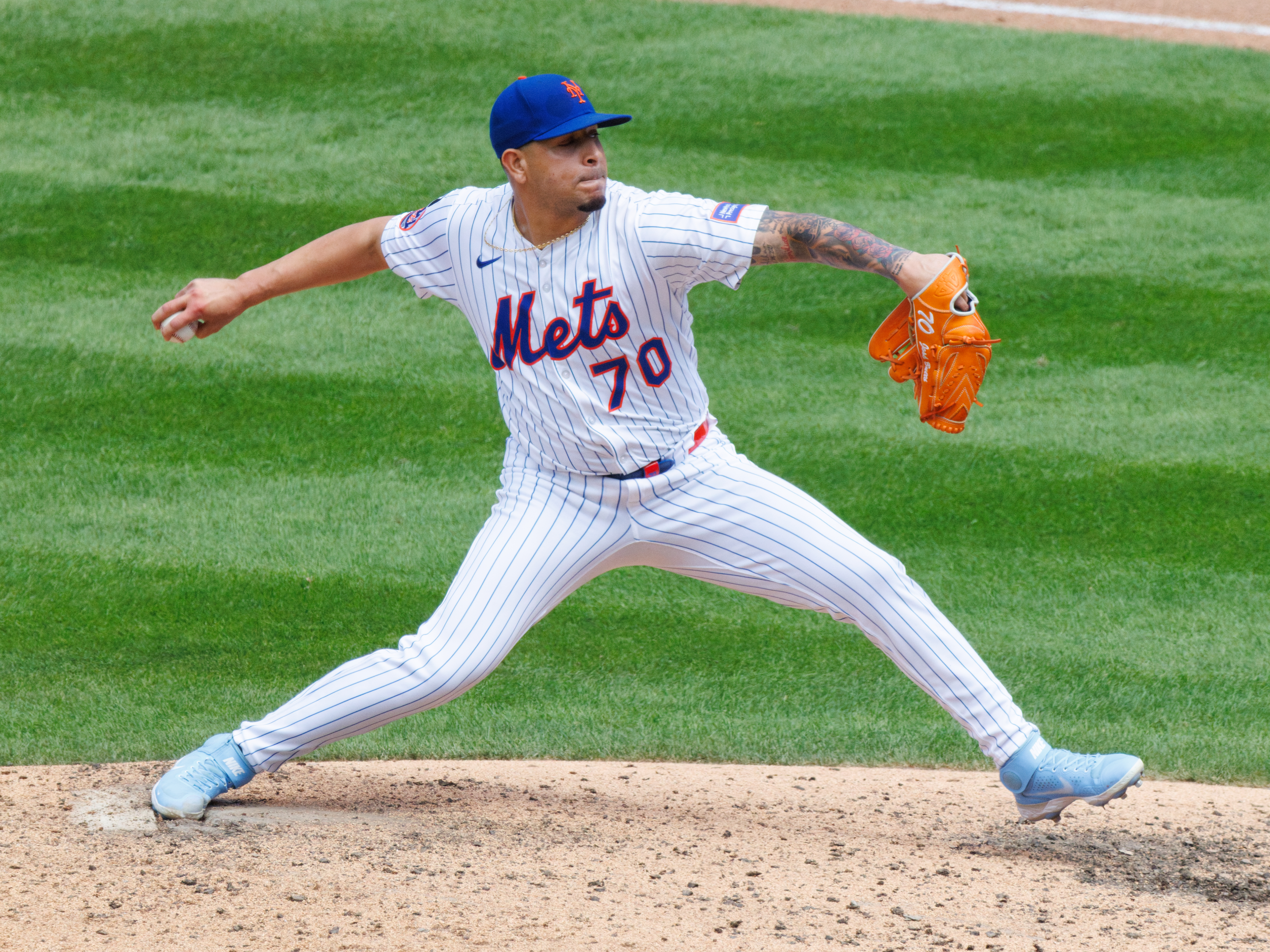
- Buttó with the Mets in 2025

Free agent
- Pitcher
- Born: March 19, 1998 (age 28); Cumaná, Venezuela
- Bats: Right Throws: Right

MLB debut
- August 21, 2022, for the New York Mets

MLB statistics (through 2026 season)
- Win–loss record: 13–10
- Earned run average: 3.76
- Strikeouts: 185
- Stats at Baseball Reference

Teams
- New York Mets (2022–2025); San Francisco Giants (2025–2026)
Medals
Men's baseball
Representing Venezuela
World Baseball Classic
Gold medal – first place	2026 Miami	Team

José Alejandro Buttó (born March 19, 1998) is a Venezuelan professional baseball pitcher who is a free agent. He has previously played in Major League Baseball (MLB) for the New York Mets and San Francisco Giants. He made his MLB debut in 2022.

== Career ==
=== New York Mets ===
Buttó signed with the New York Mets as an international free agent on June 2, 2017. He made his professional debut with the Dominican Summer League Mets, posting a 1.44 ERA across 15 appearances (8 starts). In 2018, he split time between the rookie–level Kingsport Mets and Low–A Brooklyn Cyclones, making 12 appearances (11 starts) and recording a 3.86 ERA with 55 strikeouts in 60 2/3 innings of work.

Buttó spent the entirety of the 2019 season with the Single–A Columbia Fireflies. In 27 games (25 starts), he went 4–10 with a 3.62 ERA and 109 strikeouts in 112.0 innings pitched. Buttó did not play in 2020, as the minor league season was cancelled after the COVID-19 pandemic struck. He returned to action in 2021, making 20 combined starts between High–A Brooklyn and the Double–A Binghamton Mets. In 98 2/3 innings of work, Buttó posted a 4–6 record and 3.83 ERA with 110 strikeouts.

On November 19, 2021, the Mets added Buttó to their 40-man roster to protect him from the Rule 5 draft. Buttó was assigned to the Double–A Binghamton Mets to begin the 2022 season, and posted a 6–5 record and 4.00 ERA with 108 strikeouts across 20 games (18 starts).

On August 21, 2022, Buttó was promoted to the major leagues for the first time, to make a spot start against the Philadelphia Phillies. In his debut, Buttó allowed 7 runs on 9 hits and 2 walks across 4.0 innings of work. He was optioned back to Triple–A Syracuse the following day. In 8 games (7 starts) for Syracuse, Buttó registered a 2.45 ERA with 30 strikeouts in 36 2/3 innings pitched.

Buttó was optioned to the Triple-A Syracuse Mets to begin the 2023 season. He returned to the major leagues several times across the season, with his longest stay coming after the September roster expansion. Over 9 games (7 starts) for the major league team in 2023, Buttó recorded a 1–4 record and a 3.64 ERA, with 38 strikeouts across 42 innings pitched.

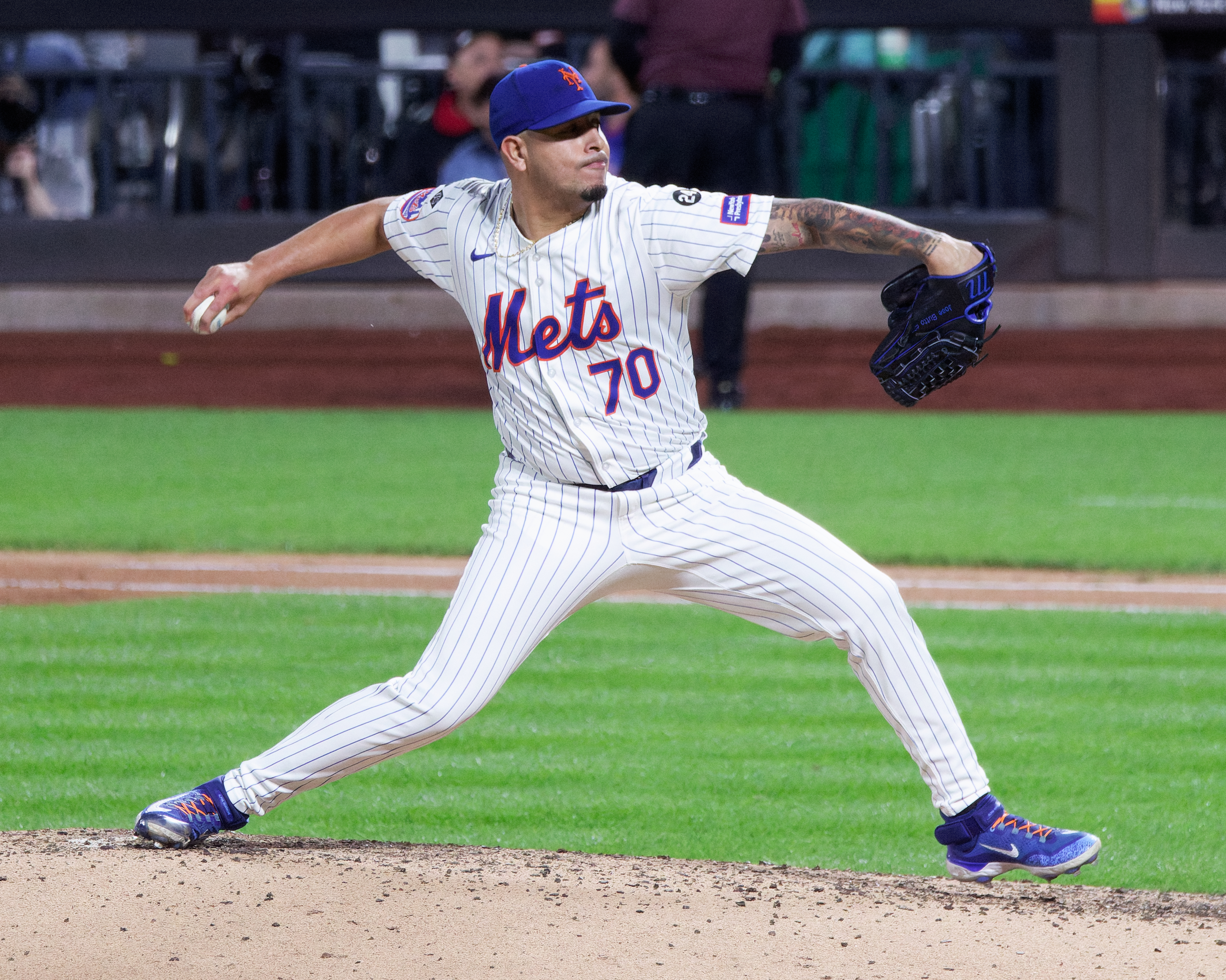
Buttó with the Mets in 2024

Buttó was again optioned to Triple–A Syracuse to begin the 2024 season after he was beaten out by Tylor Megill for the final rotation spot. After injuries to multiple members of the Mets' starting staff, Buttó was quickly brought back to the major leagues on April 4 as the 27th man on the roster to start one game of that day's doubleheader. After the game, Carlos Mendoza told the media that Buttó had earned more opportunities. In seven starts before being sent down to Syracuse on May 14, he posted a 3.08 ERA with 38 strikeouts in 38 innings.

On July 2, 2024, Buttó was called up from Syracuse to replace reliever Tyler Jay in the depleted bullpen. That day he pitched two scoreless innings and got the win in a 7–2 victory against the Washington Nationals. He recorded his first major league save on July 10 in a 6–2 win over the Nationals. In 2024, across 37 games as a starter and a reliever, Buttó posted a 7–3 record, a 2.55 ERA, and 79 strikeouts across 74 innings pitched.

Buttó made the Mets' Opening Day roster in 2025. In July 2025, Buttó was placed on the injured list due to illness. He was reactivated later that month following three scoreless rehab appearances for the Florida Complex League Mets and the Syracuse Mets. Buttó appeared in 34 games for the Mets in 2025, putting up a 3–2 record and 3.64 ERA with one save and 41 strikeouts over 47 innings.

=== San Francisco Giants ===
On July 30, 2025, the Mets traded Buttó, Drew Gilbert, and Blade Tidwell to the San Francisco Giants in exchange for pitcher Tyler Rogers. In the 21 games he appeared in for the Giants, he compiled a 2–1 record and a 4.50 ERA, striking out 17 across 20 innings of work.

On April 3, 2026, Buttó underwent surgery to remove a blood clot from his throwing arm, ruling him out for 2-to-4 months; however, his recovery timeline was later increased to 5-to-6 months, ending his season. In three games for San Francisco, he had struggled to a 22.50 ERA with five strikeouts over two innings of work.

=== Texas Rangers ===
On November 2, 2026, Buttó was claimed off of waviers by the Texas Rangers. On November 20, he was non-tendered and became a free agent.

== Personal life ==
Buttó is married. He and his wife, Emely, have one son.
