= Justin Hagenman =

American baseball player (born 1996)

New York Mets – No. 47
- Pitcher
- Born: October 7, 1996 (age 30); Voorhees Township, New Jersey, U.S.
- Bats: Right Throws: Right

MLB debut
- April 16, 2025, for the New York Mets

MLB statistics (through 2026 season)
- Win–loss record: 0–1
- Earned run average: 4.26
- Strikeouts: 27
- Stats at Baseball Reference

Teams
- New York Mets (2025–present)

Justin Michael Hagenman (born October 7, 1996) is an American professional baseball pitcher for the New York Mets of Major League Baseball (MLB). He made his MLB debut in 2025.

== Early life and amateur career ==
Born and raised in Voorhees Township, New Jersey, Hagenman played prep baseball at Bishop Eustace Preparatory School in Pennsauken Township. He attended Pennsylvania State University, where he played college baseball for the Penn State Nittany Lions baseball team. In November 2015, Hagenman earned the win for Penn State in a game against Mayabeque in a friendly tournament in Cuba. In 2016, he was one of three freshmen named to the Big Ten Conference's All-Freshman Team. In 2017, he played collegiate summer baseball with the Wareham Gatemen of the Cape Cod Baseball League. He started 14 games in each of his three seasons at Penn State.

== Professional career ==
=== Los Angeles Dodgers ===
The Los Angeles Dodgers selected Hagenman in the 23th round, with the 704th selection, of the 2018 Major League Baseball draft. He split his first professional season between the rookie-level Ogden Raptors and Single-A Great Lakes Loons. Hagenman returned to Great Lakes in 2019, posting a 6–2 win-loss record and 2.24 earned run average (ERA) with 64 strikeouts and six saves across 33 appearances. Hagenman did not play in a game in 2020 due to the cancellation of the minor league season because of the COVID-19 pandemic.

Hagenman returned to action in 2021 with the Double-A Tulsa Drillers. In 38 appearances for Tulsa, he compiled a 7–4 record and 3.45 ERA with 77 strikeouts and six saves across 62 2/3 innings pitched. Hagenman split the 2022 campaign between Tulsa and the Triple-A Oklahoma City Dodgers. In 46 appearances for the two affiliates, he registered a 5–3 record and 5.57 ERA with 65 strikeouts over 63 innings of work.

Hagenman began the 2023 season with Oklahoma City, registering a 4–0 record and 2.78 ERA with 60 strikeouts in 55 innings pitched over 25 games.

=== Boston Red Sox ===
On July 25, 2023, the Dodgers traded Hagenman and Nick Robertson to the Boston Red Sox in exchange for Enrique Hernández. The Red Sox assigned him to the Worcester Red Sox of the Triple-A International League, where he posted a 3.26 ERA with 28 strikeouts across 16 games.

After using him as a relief pitcher, the Red Sox transitioned Hagenman into a starting pitcher during the 2024 season. In 28 appearances (15 starts) for Worcester, he compiled a 4–6 record and 4.91 ERA with 98 strikeouts across 91 2/3 innings pitched. Hagenman elected free agency following the season on November 4, 2024.

=== New York Mets ===
On November 18, 2024, Hagenman signed a one-year, major league contract with the New York Mets. He was optioned to the Triple-A Syracuse Mets to begin the 2025 season. On April 16, 2025, Hagenman was promoted to the major leagues for the first time. He entered the bottom of the second inning against the Minnesota Twins and went 3^{1}/_{3} innings in a 4–3 extra inning loss. Hagenman gave up three hits, one run and had four strikeouts. The last Mets pitcher to strike out four batters in the first two innings of his MLB debut was Zack Wheeler in 2013. Hagenman earned his first save of his MLB career as he pitched the final four innings of a 13–5 win against the Atlanta Braves on August 12.

On March 14, 2026, Hagenman was placed on the 60-day injured list due to a rib fracture. On September 2, Hagenman was activated for his season debut.
