= Hayden Senger =

American baseball player (born 1997)

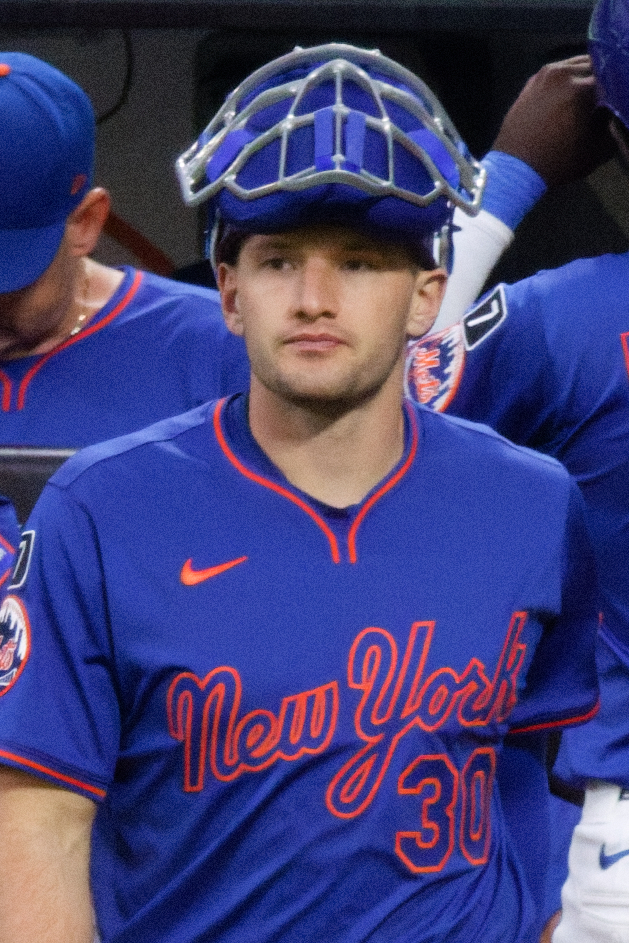
- Senger with the Mets in 2025

Free agent
- Catcher
- Born: April 3, 1997 (age 29); Hamilton, Ohio, U.S.
- Bats: Right Throws: Right

MLB debut
- March 27, 2025, for the New York Mets

MLB statistics (through 2026 season)
- Batting average: .172
- Home runs: 1
- Runs batted in: 6
- Stats at Baseball Reference

Teams
- New York Mets (2025–2026)

Hayden Craig Senger (born April 3, 1997) is an American professional baseball catcher who is a free agent. He has previously played in Major League Baseball (MLB) for the New York Mets. He made his MLB debut in 2025.

== Amateur career ==
Senger graduated from Lakota East High School in Liberty Township, Ohio, in 2015. In his high school baseball career, Senger played 110 games, recorded 108 hits, 75 RBI, four home runs, and a .352 batting average. He attended Miami University and played college baseball for the Miami RedHawks from 2016 to 2018. During the 2018 season Senger hit for a .344 batting average and made only one error, leading to First-Team All-Mid-American Conference and All-Defensive Team selections.

== Professional career ==
=== Minor leagues ===
The New York Mets drafted Senger in the 24th round, with the 710th overall selection, of the 2018 Major League Baseball draft. He spent his first professional season with the rookie-level Kingsport Mets and Low-A Brooklyn Cyclones. Senger spent the 2019 campaign with the Single-A Columbia Fireflies, playing in 90 games and slashing .230/.324/.345 with four home runs and 36 RBI. He did not play in a game in 2020 due to the cancellation of the minor league season because of the COVID-19 pandemic.

Senger returned to action in 2021 with Brooklyn and the Double-A Binghamton Rumble Ponies, playing in 61 total games and batting .263/.341/.429 with five home runs and 14 RBI. He made 83 total appearances in 2022 with Binghamton and the Triple-A Syracuse Mets, slashing .240/.309/.358 with five home runs, 31 RBI, and three stolen bases.

Senger returned to Binghamton for the 2023 campaign, playing in 81 total contests and batting .188/.307/.295 with five home runs, 26 RBI, and three stolen bases. He split the 2024 season between Syracuse, Binghamton, and the Single-A St. Lucie Mets. In 55 appearances for the three affiliates, Senger hit .234/.302/.363 with three home runs and 29 RBI.

=== Major leagues ===
Senger made the Mets' Opening Day roster for the 2025 season. He made his MLB debut on March 27, 2025 against the Houston Astros as a late-game substitute at catcher, and struck out in his only at bat. On April 2, in a game against the Miami Marlins, Senger recorded his first major league hit, a double. On April 24, Senger was optioned to Triple-A Syracuse after Jeff McNeil and Francisco Álvarez were activated from the injured list. While Senger was recalled on June 10 as Alvarez went on the paternity list, he was sent back down on June 12, without starting either game. Senger was brought back to the majors on June 22 when Álvarez was sent down to Triple-A. Senger was again optioned to Triple-A in favor of Álvarez on July 21. On August 19, Senger was brought up to the major leagues due to a thumb sprain suffered by Álvarez. On August 21, Senger collected his first major league run batted in.

Senger was optioned to Triple-A Syracuse to begin the 2026 season. He was recalled on April 18, but was sent back down on April 22 without playing in a game. Senger was called up again on May 13 after Francisco Álvarez tore his meniscus. Senger played his first major league game of 2026 on May 14, and drove in a run with a safety squeeze in the sixth inning. In the Mets' game against the Miami Marlins on May 30, Senger hit his first major league home run, a solo homer in the seventh inning. He was sent back to Triple-A on June 9. On November 20, 2026, Senger was non-tendered by the Mets and became a free agent.

== Personal life ==
Senger's wife, Ryann, works as a physician assistant. Starting in 2023, Senger worked at a Whole Foods Market near Nashville during the MLB offseason.
