= Blade Tidwell =

American baseball player (born 2001)

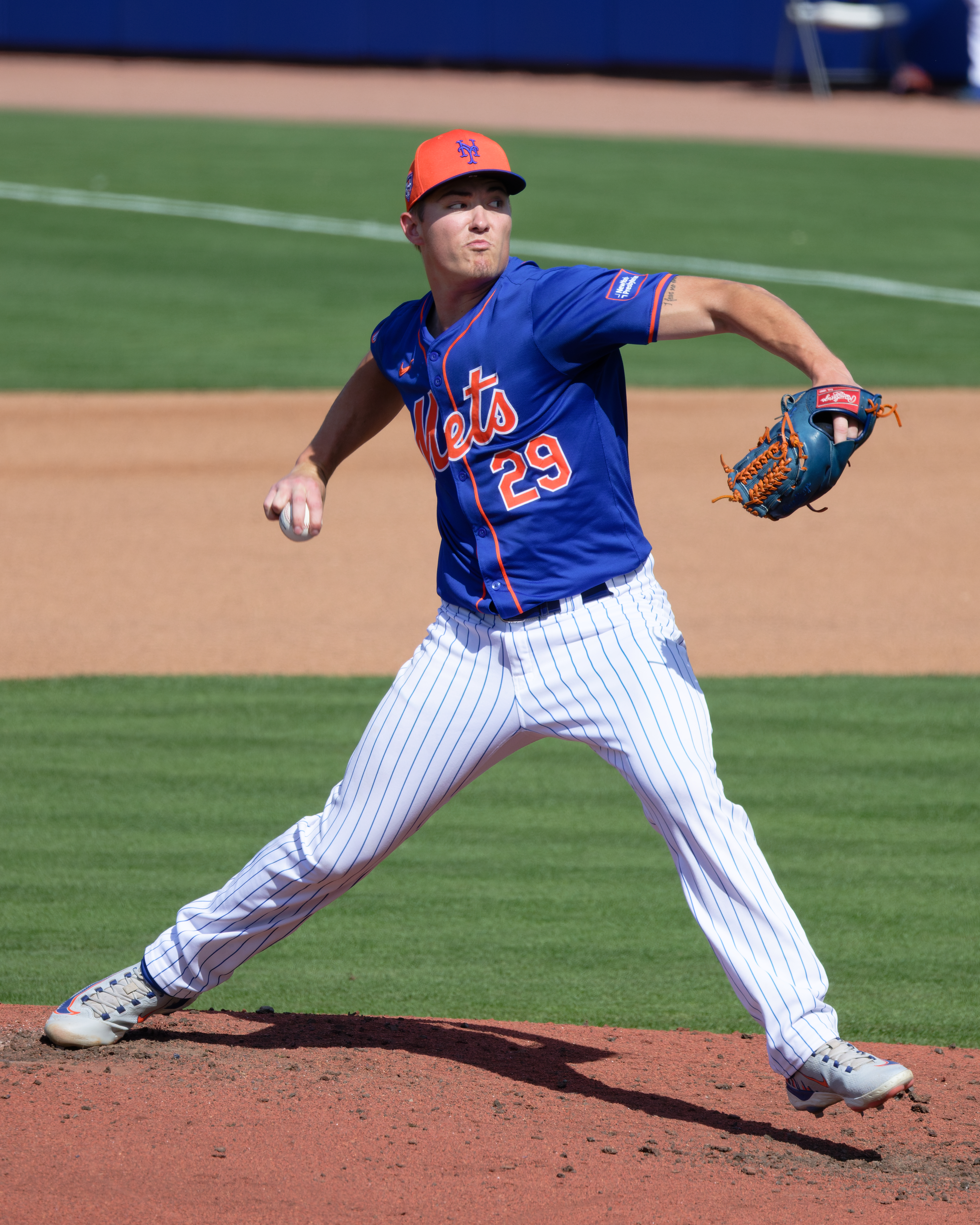
- Tidwell with the Mets in 2024

San Francisco Giants – No. 46
- Pitcher
- Born: June 8, 2001 (age 25); Columbia, Tennessee, U.S.
- Bats: Right Throws: Right

MLB debut
- May 4, 2025, for the New York Mets

MLB statistics (through 2026 season)
- Win–loss record: 2–3
- Earned run average: 5.40
- Strikeouts: 56
- Stats at Baseball Reference

Teams
- New York Mets (2025); San Francisco Giants (2026–present)

Janzen Blade Tidwell (born June 8, 2001) is an American professional baseball pitcher for the San Francisco Giants of Major League Baseball (MLB). He has previously played in MLB for the New York Mets. He made his MLB debut in 2025.

== Early life ==
Tidwell attended Loretto High School in Loretto, Tennessee, where he played baseball and was teammates with Ryan Weathers. In 2019, his junior year, he was named Tennessee Mr. Baseball after going 8–0 with 107 strikeouts alongside batting .557. He played only one game during his senior season in 2020 due to the COVID-19 pandemic.

== Amateur career ==
In 2021, as a freshman for the Tennessee Volunteers baseball team, Tidwell was inserted into their starting rotation. He finished his freshman season starting 18 games and going 10–3 with a 3.74 ERA and ninety strikeouts over 98 2/3 innings. He was named to the USA Baseball National Collegiate Team after the season alongside teammate Drew Gilbert. Tidwell entered the 2022 season as a preseason All-American and a top prospect for the upcoming draft. He missed the beginning of the season dealing with shoulder soreness. After missing Tennessee's first 24 games, he made his season debut in late March, pitching one inning in relief. He made his first start of the season on April 5 in a 5–1 win versus Lipscomb. He finished the season having appeared in 13 games (making nine starts), going 3–2 with a 3.00 ERA and 51 strikeouts over 39 innings.

== Professional career ==
=== Draft and minor leagues (2022–2025) ===
The New York Mets selected Tidwell in the second round with the 52nd overall selection of the 2022 Major League Baseball draft. He signed with the team for $1.8 million.

Tidwell made his professional debut with the rookie-level Florida Complex League Mets and was promoted to the Single-A St. Lucie Mets after one game. Over 9 1/3 innings pitched for the season, he went 0–1 with a 1.93 ERA, 11 strikeouts, and seven walks. Tidwell was assigned to the High-A Brooklyn Cyclones to begin the 2023 season. In late June, he was promoted to the Double-A Binghamton Rumble Ponies. Over 25 starts, Tidwell went 11–6 with a 3.57 ERA and 153 strikeouts over 116 innings.

To open the 2024 season, Tidwell was assigned to Binghamton. In mid-May, he was promoted to the Triple-A Syracuse Mets. Over 26 games (22 starts) between the two teams, he posted a 3–13 record with a 4.86 ERA and 121 strikeouts over 122 1/3 innings. He was assigned to Syracuse to open the 2025 season. Tidwell pitched in 17 games for Syracuse during the season and went 6-4 with a 4.10 ERA.

=== New York Mets (2025) ===
On May 2, 2025, Tidwell was selected to the 40-man roster and promoted to the major leagues for the first time. He made his major league debut on May 4 in a start against the St. Louis Cardinals. Tidwell allowed six earned runs on nine hits and three walks, alongside two strikeouts, before being pulled from the game during the fourth inning. On July 2, Tidwell earned his first career victory after allowing three runs and recording three strikeouts in 4 1/3 innings against the Milwaukee Brewers. Tidwell made four appearances (two starts) for the Mets and pitched to a 1-1 record, a 9.00 ERA, 10 strikeouts and 10 walks across 15 innings.

=== San Francisco Giants (2025–present) ===
On July 30, 2025, the Mets traded Tidwell, Drew Gilbert, and José Buttó to the San Francisco Giants in exchange for pitcher Tyler Rogers. The Giants assigned Tidwell to the Triple-A Sacramento River Cats, with whom he had a 1.50 ERA over 18 innings. He was placed on the injured list with a right shoulder injury on August 21 and activated September 17.

Tidwell was optioned to Triple-A Sacramento to open the 2026 season. He was recalled on April 2, 2026 after Buttó had been placed on the 15-day injured list. Tidwell was moved into San Francisco's starting rotation in early August following the trade deadline. On September 21, Tidwell exited a start against the Minnesota Twins with right-hander felt elbow discomfort. The following day, it was announced that he was diagnosed with a “high-grade” sprain of the ulnar collateral ligament and was placed on the 15-day injured list, ending his season. Later that day, the team announced that he was recommended for surgery. Tidwell appeared in 17 games (making nine starts) for the Giants in 2026 and had a 1–2 record with a 4.45 ERA and 46 strikeouts over 56 2/3 innings.
