= Francisco Álvarez (baseball) =

Venezuelan baseball player (born 2001)

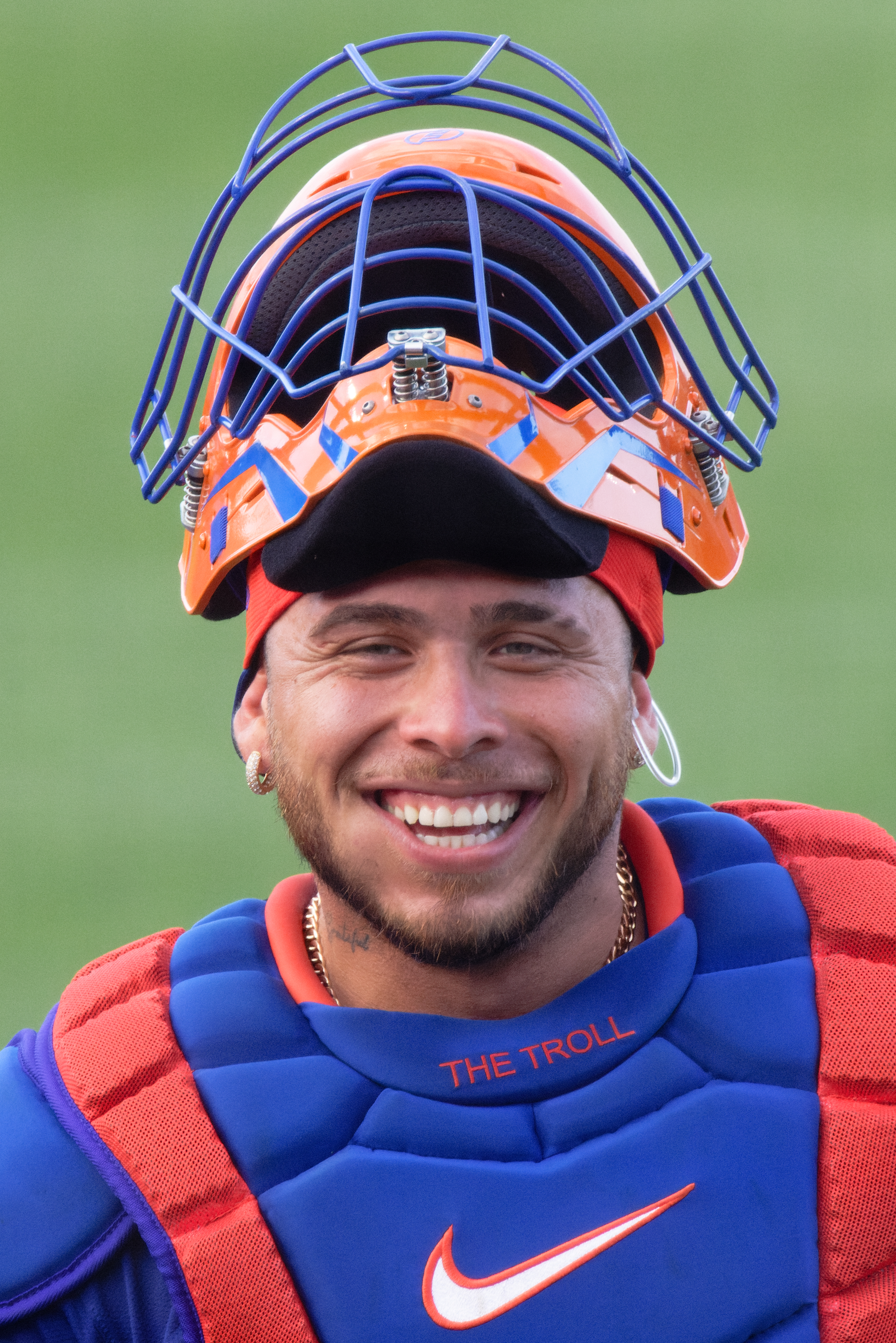
- Álvarez with the Mets in 2024

New York Mets – No. 4
- Catcher
- Born: November 19, 2001 (age 25); Guatire, Venezuela
- Bats: Right Throws: Right

MLB debut
- September 30, 2022, for the New York Mets

MLB statistics (through 2026 season)
- Batting average: .231
- Home runs: 64
- Runs batted in: 186
- Stats at Baseball Reference

Teams
- New York Mets (2022–present)

Francisco Javier Álvarez (born November 19, 2001), nicknamed El Troll, is a Venezuelan professional baseball catcher for the New York Mets of Major League Baseball (MLB). He made his MLB debut in 2022.

== Early life ==
Álvarez was born in Guatire, Venezuela. Between his father, José, and mother, Yolanda, Álvarez had two older siblings and an older half-brother. His sister died when he was a teenager.

As a youth, Álvarez developed his strength by working for his father's construction company. He dropped out of school to pursue baseball full-time at eleven years old, by which point he was already playing in international tournaments. He later received his high school diploma via the Mets' Latin American baseball academy.

Inspired by fellow Venezuelan catcher Henry Blanco, Álvarez started catching at twelve years old.

== Professional career ==
=== Minor leagues ===
Álvarez signed with the New York Mets as an international free agent in July 2018. He spent his first professional season in 2019 with the Gulf Coast League Mets and Kingsport Mets, batting .312 with seven home runs and 26 runs batted in (RBI) over 42 games with both teams. Álvarez did not play a minor league game in 2020 due to the cancellation of the minor league season caused by the COVID-19 pandemic.

The Mets invited Álvarez to spring training in 2021. He split the season between the St. Lucie Mets and the Brooklyn Cyclones, slashing .272/.388/.554 with 24 home runs and 70 RBI over 99 games. In June, Álvarez was selected to play in the All-Star Futures Game, in which he homered. Álvarez again participated in spring training with the Mets in 2022.

=== Major leagues ===
==== 2022 ====
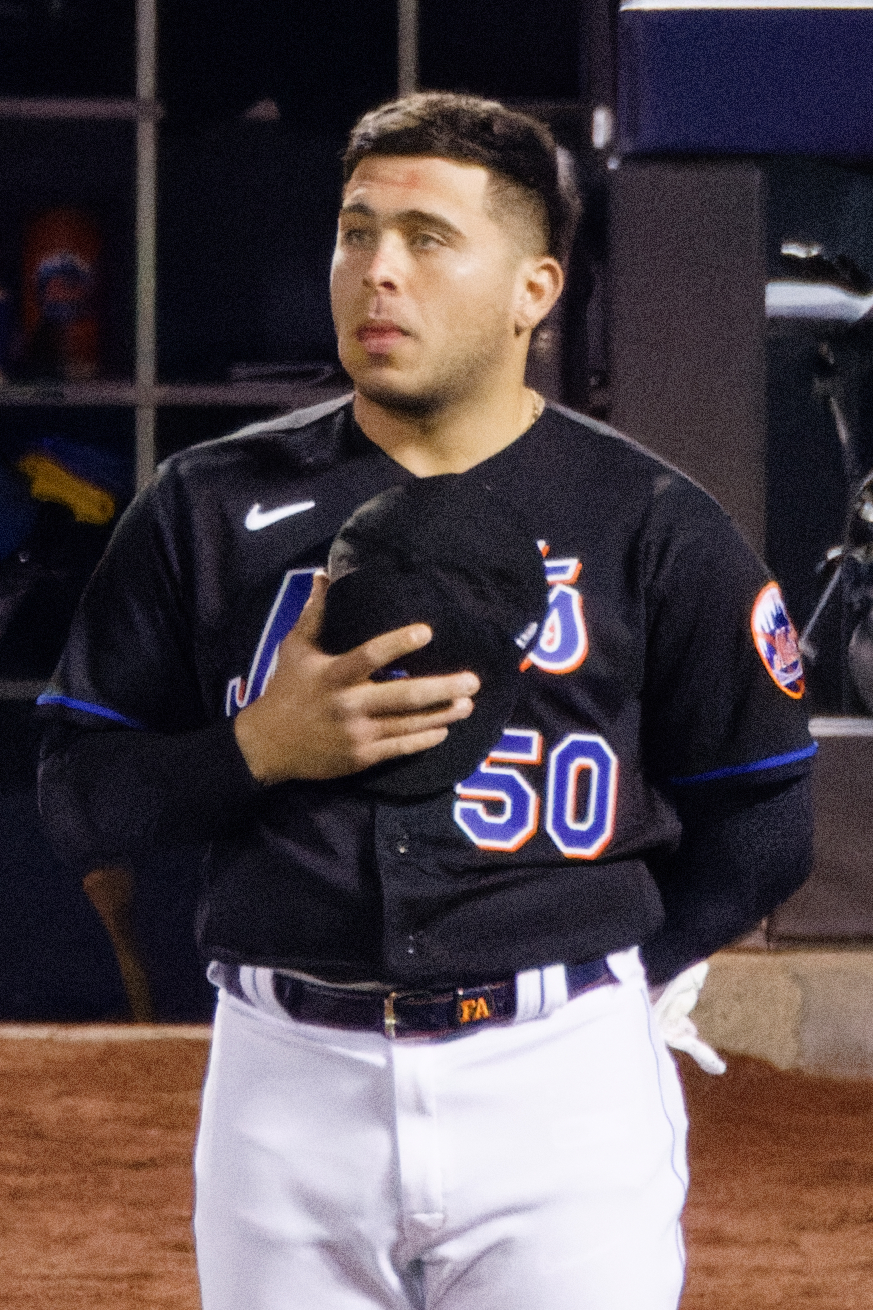
Álvarez with the Mets in 2022

The New York Mets promoted Álvarez to the major leagues on September 30, 2022, and he made his major league debut as a designated hitter on the same day against the Atlanta Braves. On October 4, after going hitless in his first eight at bats, Álvarez hit his first major league home run, a solo blast off Washington Nationals reliever Carl Edwards Jr. It was also the first Major League game in which he played catcher. He was the youngest player to appear in the major leagues in 2022. Álvarez made his postseason debut in the 2022 NL Wild Card Series against the San Diego Padres, in which he had one plate appearance.

==== 2023 ====
The Mets optioned Álvarez to the Triple-A Syracuse Mets to begin the 2023 season. His time in Triple-A did not last long, as he was recalled to the Mets on April 7 following a leg injury to Omar Narváez. He platooned with backup catcher Tomás Nido, and became the starting catcher after Nido was designated for assignment when Narváez returned. Álvarez hit two home runs on June 8 against the Atlanta Braves, making franchise history as the second youngest Mets player to hit three home runs in a two-game span since Darryl Strawberry. Álvarez is also the 12th player in MLB history with at least 12 home runs in the first 46 career games under the age of 22.

On June 10, during a game against the Pittsburgh Pirates, Álvarez passed Johnny Bench for the most home runs in the first 45 games played in a season for primary-position catchers at the age of 21 or younger. Álvarez's 13 home runs in 49 games is second to catcher Gary Sánchez (19). He also joined Will Smith and Evan Gattis, both with 13 home runs. On July 4 against the Arizona Diamondbacks, Álvarez hit his 14th home run, a 467-foot shot to dead center off pitcher Miguel Castro. With this homer, he broke the Mets record for most home runs by a rookie catcher, surpassing Travis d'Arnaud, Jason Phillips, and Todd Hundley. On July 29, during a game against the Washington Nationals, Álvarez hit his 20th home run of the season, becoming only the second 21-year-old catcher to reach 20 home runs in a season. On August 2, he was named the National League Rookie of the Month for July. On September 30 against the Philadelphia Phillies, Álvarez hit his first career grand slam off pitcher Michael Plassmeyer, leading the Mets to an 11–4 victory. In 2023, Álvarez played in 123 games for the Mets, batting .209/.284/.437 (.721 OPS) with 25 home runs and 63 RBI.

==== 2024 ====
On April 20, 2024, Álvarez was placed on the 15-day injured list with a left thumb sprain following a stumble while rounding first base in a game against the Los Angeles Dodgers. Later that day, it was announced that he had torn a ligament in his left thumb and would need surgery. An eight-week recovery timetable was given for his return. On May 28, five and a half weeks after tearing the ligament, it was announced Álvarez would begin his rehab assignment with the Double-A Binghamton Rumble Ponies. On June 4, Álvarez caught all nine innings of the High-A Brooklyn Cyclones' first full no-hitter in franchise history. The Mets activated Álvarez from the injured list on June 11 after Tomás Nido was designated for assignment.

On August 19, during a game against the Baltimore Orioles, Álvarez hit his first career walk-off home run, off of pitcher Seranthony Domínguez. At 22-years-old, he became the 3rd youngest player in Mets history to accomplish the feat. On September 13, Álvarez recorded the 100th RBI of his career on a three-run home run off of Aaron Nola of the Philadelphia Phillies. Álvarez played in 100 games for the Mets in 2024, batting .237/.307/.403 (.710 OPS) with 11 home runs and 47 RBI.

On October 2, Álvarez recorded the first postseason RBI of his career, a single off of Frankie Montas to score Starling Marte in Game 2 of the NL Wild Card Series against the Milwaukee Brewers. After playing poorly in the NL Division Series, Álvarez batted .412 with seven hits, three runs, and 2 RBI across six games of the NL Championship Series against the Los Angeles Dodgers. Across 13 games of the 2024 postseason, Álvarez batted .256/.298/.279 (.577 OPS) with no home runs, 11 hits, one double, 4 runs scored, and 3 RBI.

==== 2025 ====
On March 8, 2025, Álvarez fractured his left hamate bone during live batting practice. He was subsequently ruled out for 6–8 weeks after surgery was deemed necessary. On April 24, the Mets activated Álvarez and made his season debut the next day against the Washington Nationals. In his debut, he went 1-for-4 with no walks and a strikeout in a 5–4 loss. Alvarez was demoted to the minors on June 22, amidst both offensive and defensive struggles.

After hitting to a .299 average with 11 home runs across 19 Triple-A games, Álvarez returned to the Mets lineup on July 21. In his debut, he went 2-for-4 with a double and scored the game-tying run in a 7–5 victory over the Los Angeles Angels. Álvarez played in 76 games for the Mets in 2025, batting .256/.339/.447 (.787 OPS), all career-bests, with 11 home runs and 32 RBI. On September 29, it was announced that Álvarez would require surgery to repair the ulnar collateral ligament in his right thumb.

==== 2026 ====
On March 26, 2026, Opening Day, Álvarez made the first successful ABS challenge in Major League history, after he challenged a ball call on a pitch by Freddy Peralta in the third inning. The call was changed to a strike, resulting in the batter, Oneil Cruz, striking out. On May 13, it was announced that Álvarez would undergo surgery for a torn meniscus, a procedure that takes 6-8 weeks to recover from. Prior to the injury, Álvarez had hit to a .241/.317/.393 (.710 OPS) slash line with four home runs across 37 games. On June 9, he was reactivated from the injured list after recovering from surgery in just four weeks.

Across 113 games in 2026, Álvarez batted .233/.311/.399 (.710 OPS) with 16 home runs and 43 RBI, along with new career-highs in hits (87) and walks (39).

== Personal life ==
Álvarez has several tattoos. He has cited the lion on his left arm as his favorite. His other tattoos include the words “the best" on his neck, the words "family first" and tributes to his parents and deceased sister.

When Álvarez came to the United States for his first professional season at 16 years old, his parents accompanied him to help ease the transition. At that time, he spoke no English, and had to rely on older teammate José Buttó to speak the language on his behalf. After studying diligently with Mets staff, getting help from coaches and teammates such as Brett Baty and doing mock interviews with SNY reporter Steve Gelbs, Álvarez was able to conduct live television interviews in English before the start of the 2024 season.
