= Ender Chávez =

Venezuelan baseball player & coach (born 1981)

- Outfielder / Coach
- Born: March 9, 1981 (age 45); Valencia, Carabobo, Venezuela
- Bats: Left Throws: Left

Teams
- New York Mets (2020)

Ender James Chávez (born March 9, 1981) is a Venezuelan professional baseball coach. He is the former batting practice pitcher for the New York Mets of Major League Baseball (MLB).

== Career ==
=== Playing career ===
Chávez signed with the Colorado Rockies as a non-drafted free agent on Aug. 31, 1998, playing his first two seasons in the Venezuelan Summer League in 1999 and 2000. In 2001, Chávez played for the Casper Rockies before being traded to the New York Mets on August 23, 2001, as the player to be named later for Gary Bennett. Chávez began the 2002 season with the St. Lucie Mets, and was later promoted to the Brooklyn Cyclones. He returned to Brooklyn for the start of 2003, ultimately splitting that season with the Cyclones, Capital City Bombers, and St. Lucie.

After the 2003 season, he was acquired by the Montreal Expos in the Rule 5 draft. He remained with organization as they moved to Washington, D.C., becoming the Washington Nationals, starting with the 2005 season. At this time, his older brother Endy was traded to the Philadelphia Phillies. Ender played for the Brevard County Manatees in 2004 and the Potomac Nationals in 2005. In 2006, he was promoted to the double-AA level for the first time playing for the Harrisburg Senators and Potomac. He would conclude the 2006 season playing for Pastora de Occidente of the VSL into early 2007.

Chávez returned to the Mets organization, playing for the Brooklyn Cyclones and St. Lucie Mets in 2007, hitting .170 for the former and .279 for the latter. In 2008, he played for the Yuma Scorpions of the Golden Baseball League, hitting .400 in 10 at-bats before retiring as a player.

=== New York Mets ===
Chávez was hired as a Venezuelan-area scout for the New York Mets in 2010. He began his minor league coaching career as the hitting coach for the DSL Mets 2 from 2011 to 2012. From 2013 to 2015 he was the hitting coach for the Gulf Coast League Mets. From 2016 to 2017 he was the hitting coach for the Kingsport Mets. In 2018, he was named the hitting coach for the Columbia Fireflies. In 2019, he was named the bench coach for the Binghamton Rumble Ponies. In 2020, Chávez was promoted to the Mets coaching staff as the batting practice pitcher. In 2021, he was replaced by Rafael Fernandez as the batting practice pitcher and hired as the co-bench coach with his brother Endy for the realigned second minor league team in Port St. Lucie.

=== Washington Nationals ===
In 2025, Chávez was named the hitting coach for the Washington Nationals' rookie-level affiliate, the Florida Complex League Nationals.

== Personal life ==
He is the younger brother of former Major League Baseball outfielder Endy Chávez.
