= Rafael Fernandez (baseball) =

Dominican baseball coach (born 1988)

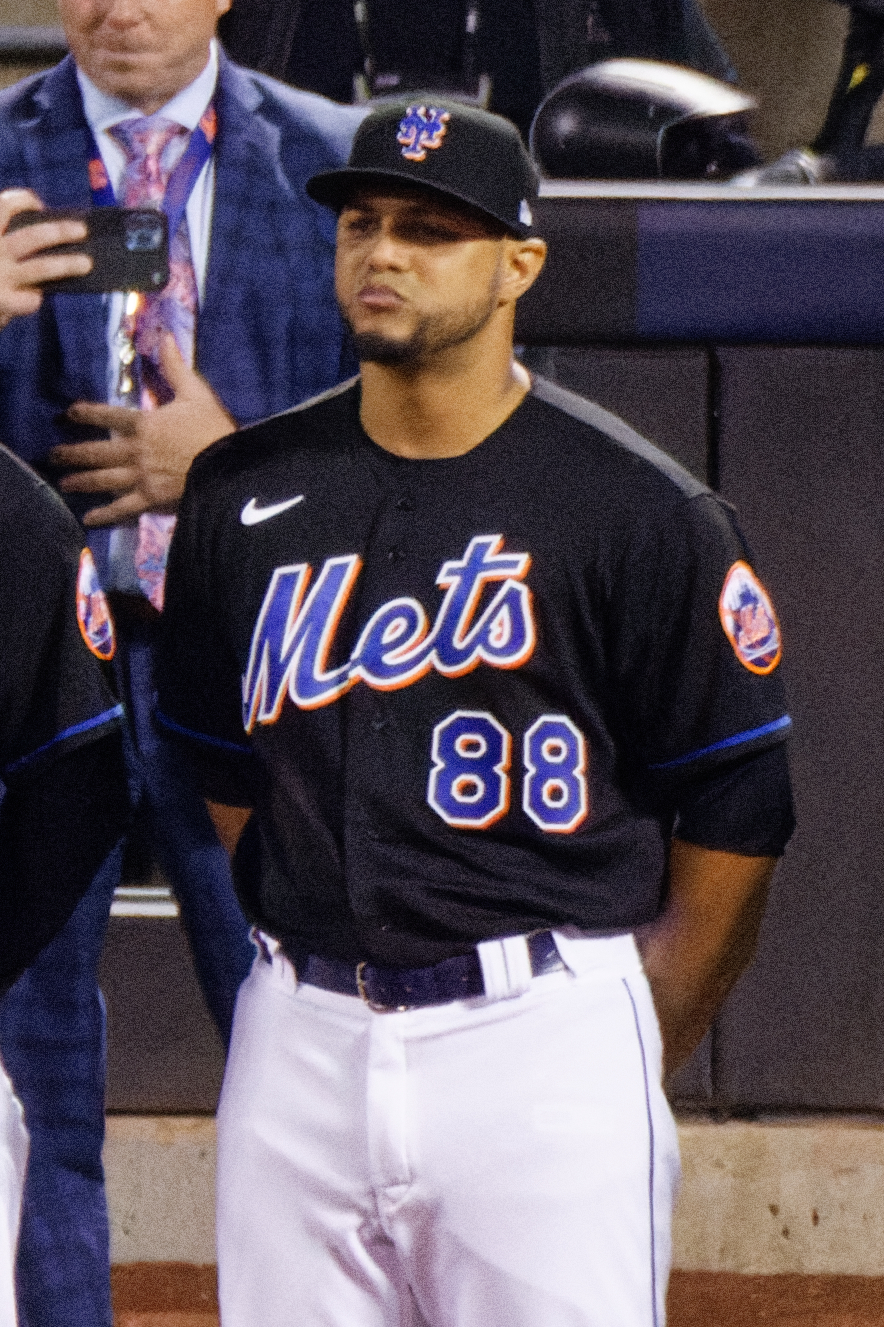
- Fernandez with the Mets in 2022

New York Mets – No. 80
- Outfielder / Coach
- Born: August 3, 1988 (age 38); Tenares, Dominican Republic
- Bats: Left Throws: Left

Teams
- New York Mets (2021–present)

Rafael A. Fernandez Reyes (born August 3, 1988) is a Dominican professional baseball coach serving as the assistant hitting coach for the New York Mets of Major League Baseball (MLB). He was the batting practice pitcher for the Mets from 2021 to 2025.

== Career ==
=== Playing career ===
Fernandez was an outfielder. He began his seven-year professional playing career in the Mets farm system, having signed as an undrafted free agent. He began in 2006 with the Dominican Summer League Mets, moved to the Gulf Coast League Mets for 2007, spent 2008 with the Kingsport Mets and the Brooklyn Cyclones, 2009 and 2010 with the Savannah Sand Gnats, and 2011 with the St. Lucie Mets, before being demoted back to the Gnats. In 2012, he was promoted to the Binghamton Mets, before being demoted once again to St. Lucie. His playing career ended after spending two winter seasons with the Gigantes del Cibao for the 2012–2013 season and the Estrellas de Oriente for 2013-2014 of the Dominican Winter League.

=== Coaching career ===
Fernandez began his coaching career in the Mets minor league system as an outfield coach in May 2015 before being promoted to hitting coach in November 2015. In 2016, he was named the hitting coach for the Dominican Summer League Mets 2.

From 2017 to 2018, he was the hitting coach for the Gulf Coast Mets. In 2019, Fernandez was hired as the hitting coach for the Kingsport Mets. In 2020, he was named the hitting coach for the Brooklyn Cyclones.

In 2021, Fernandez was promoted to the Mets coaching staff as the batting practice pitcher, replacing Ender Chávez. He received praise for his effectiveness in that role over the course of five seasons, before being promoted to assistant hitting coach beginning in 2026.
