= New York Mets =

Major League Baseball franchise

- 2026 New York Mets season

Logo	Cap insignia
- Established in 1962

Major league affiliations
- National League (1962–present); East Division (1969–present)

Current uniform
- Retired numbers: 5; 14; 15; 16; 17; 18; 24; 31; 36; 37; 41; 42

Colors
- Blue, orange, white

Name
- New York Mets (1962–present)

Nicknames
- The Metropolitans; The Amazin' Mets; The Amazin's; The Metsies; The Orange and Blue; The Miracle Mets (1969); The Bad Guys (1986)

Ballpark
- Citi Field (2009–present); Shea Stadium (1964–2008); Polo Grounds (1962–1963)

Major league titles
- World Series titles (2): 1969; 1986
- NL pennants (5): 1969; 1973; 1986; 2000; 2015
- NL East division titles (6): 1969; 1973; 1986; 1988; 2006; 2015
- Wild card berths (5): 1999; 2000; 2016; 2022; 2024

Front office
- Principal owners: Steve Cohen; Alexandra M. Cohen
- President: Steve Cohen (CEO)
- President of baseball operations: David Stearns
- General manager: Vacant
- Manager: Andy Green
- Website: mlb.com/mets

The New York Mets are an American professional baseball team based in the New York City borough of Queens. The Mets compete in Major League Baseball (MLB) as a member club of the National League (NL) East Division. They are one of two major league clubs based in New York City alongside the American League (AL)'s New York Yankees. One of baseball's first expansion teams, the Mets were founded in 1962 to replace New York's departed NL teams, the Brooklyn Dodgers and the New York Giants. The team's colors evoke the blue of the Dodgers and the orange of the Giants.

For the 1962 and 1963 seasons, the Mets played home games at the Polo Grounds in Manhattan before moving to Queens. From 1964 to 2008, the Mets played their home games at Shea Stadium, named after William Shea, the founder of the Continental League, a proposed third major league, the announcement of which prompted their admission as an NL expansion team. Since 2009, the Mets have played their home games at Citi Field next to the site where Shea Stadium once stood.

In their inaugural season, the Mets posted a record of 40–120, the second-most regular-season losses since MLB went to a 162-game schedule. The team never finished better than second-to-last in the 1960s until the "Miracle Mets" defeated the Baltimore Orioles in the 1969 World Series, considered one of the biggest upsets in World Series history despite the Mets having won 100 games that season. The Mets have qualified for the postseason eleven times, winning the World Series twice (1969 and 1986) and winning five National League pennants (most recently in 2000 and 2015), and six National League East division titles.

Since 2020, the Mets have been owned by billionaire hedge fund manager Steve Cohen, who purchased the team for $2.4 billion. As of 2025, Forbes ranked the Mets as the sixth most valuable MLB team, valued at $3.2 billion.

As of the end of the 2026 regular season, the team's overall win–loss record is 4,973–5,315–8 (.483).

== History ==
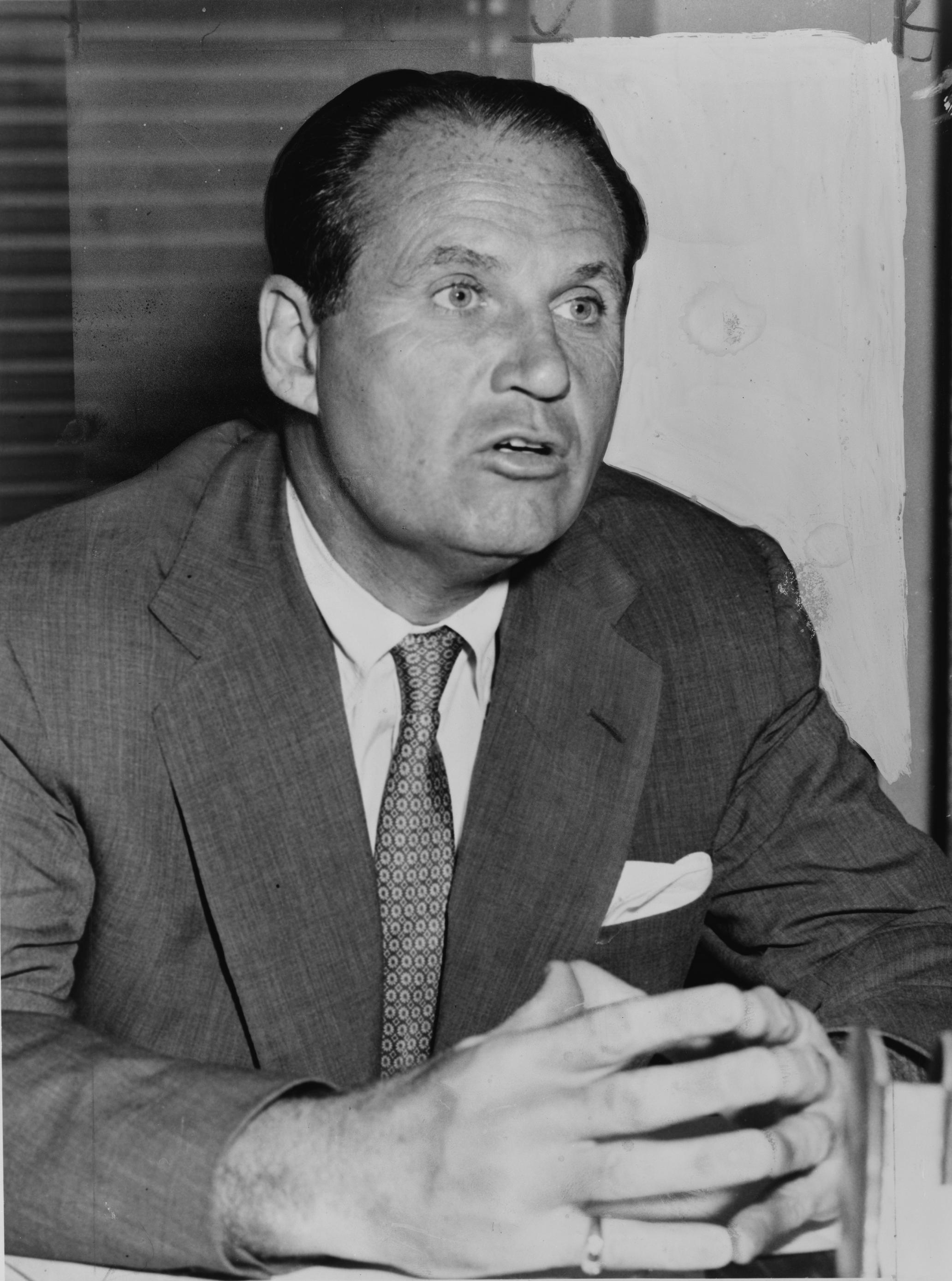
William Shea was instrumental in returning National League baseball to New York City after five years of absence.

=== 1960s: Founding and first World Series ===
After the 1957 season, the Brooklyn Dodgers and New York Giants relocated from New York to California to become the Los Angeles Dodgers and San Francisco Giants, leaving the largest city in the United States with no National League franchise and only one major league team, the New York Yankees of the American League (AL). With the threat of a New York team joining the new Continental League, the National League expanded by adding the New York Mets, following a proposal from William Shea. On March 6, 1961, National League President Warren Giles formally sent the New York Mets a certificate of membership. In a symbolic reference to New York's earlier National League teams, the new team took as its primary colors the blue of the Dodgers and the orange of the Giants, both of which are colors also featured on the flag of New York City. The nickname "Mets" was adopted as a natural shorthand to the club's corporate name, the "New York Metropolitan Baseball Club, Inc.", which hearkened back to the "Metropolitans" (a New York team in the American Association from 1880 to 1887), and its brevity was advantageous for newspaper headlines.

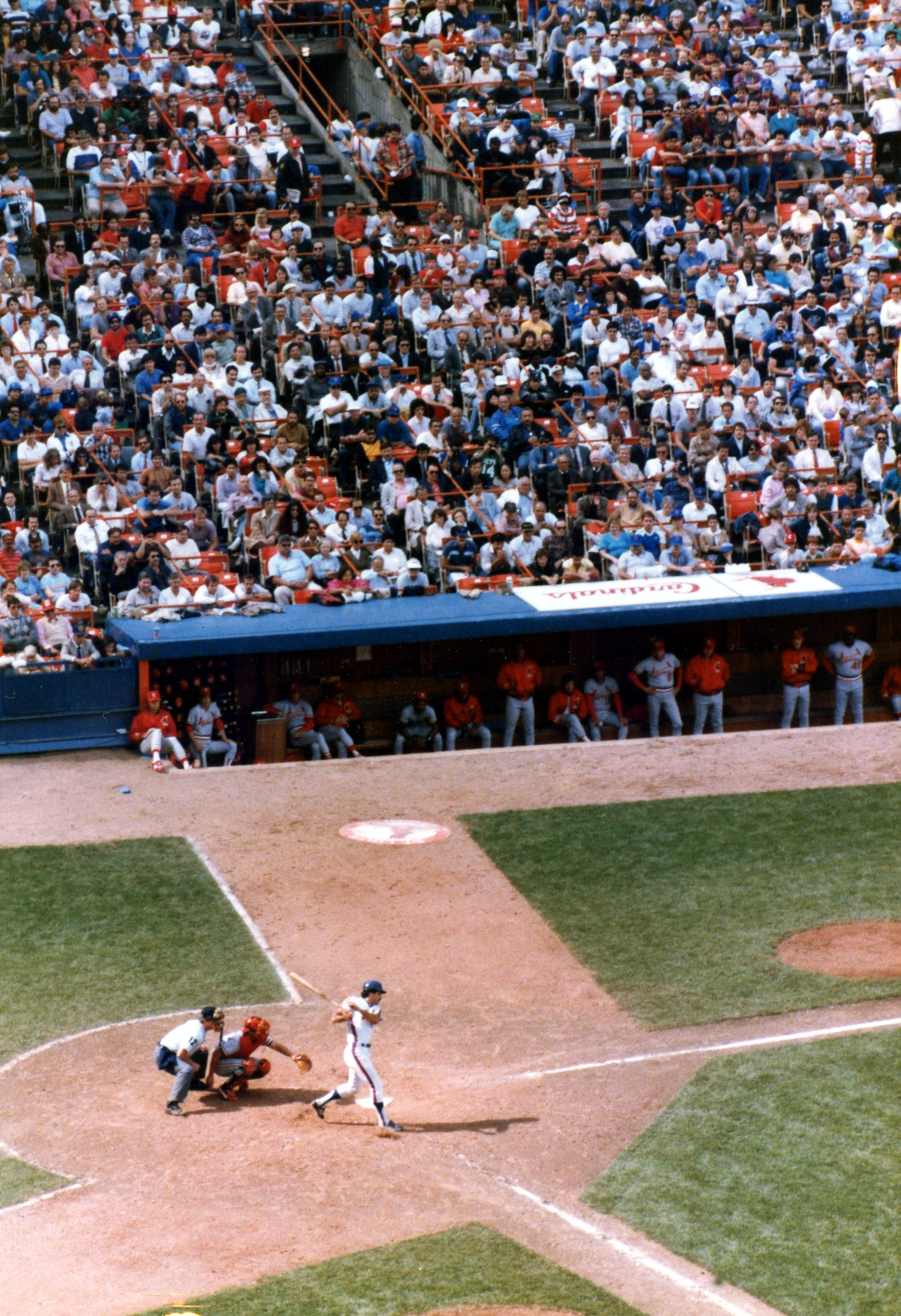
Shea Stadium was the Mets' home field from 1964 to 2008.

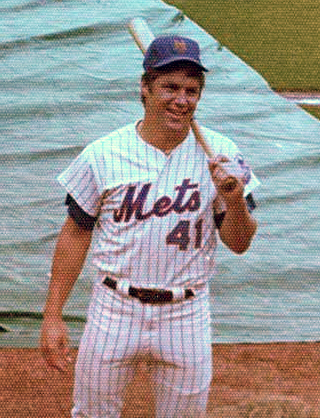
Tom Seaver, three-time Cy Young Award winner, led the Mets to victory in the 1969 World Series. He was inducted into the Hall of Fame in 1992.

The 1962 Mets posted a 40–120 record, the second most losses by a post-1900 MLB team behind the 2024 Chicago White Sox. During the 1963 season the team featured a pitcher, Carlton Willey, who had pitched four shutouts to start the year when he incurred an injury. He finished with a 9–14 win–loss record. The '63 squad also featured Duke Snider, who achieved his 2,000th hit and later his 400th home run, and earned a berth to the 1963 All-Star Game. In 1964, the Mets hired Yogi Berra as a coach under Casey Stengel's coaching staff.

In 1966, the Mets famously bypassed future Hall of Famer Reggie Jackson in the amateur draft, instead selecting Steve Chilcott, who never played in the majors. But the following year, they acquired future Hall of Famer Tom Seaver in a lottery. Seaver helped the 1969 "Miracle Mets" win the new National League East division title, then defeat the Atlanta Braves to win the National League pennant and the heavily favored Baltimore Orioles to win the 1969 World Series.

=== 1970s: Second pennant and the "Midnight Massacre" ===
In 1973, the Mets rallied from 5th place to win the division, despite a record of only 82–79. They shocked the heavily favored Cincinnati Reds' "Big Red Machine" in the NLCS and pushed the defending World Series champion Oakland Athletics to a seventh game, but lost the series. Notably, 1973 was the only NL East title between 1970 and 1980 that was not won by either the Philadelphia Phillies or the Pittsburgh Pirates. On the night of June 15, 1977 star pitcher Tom Seaver was traded to the Cincinnati Reds for Pat Zachry, Doug Flynn, Steve Henderson, and Dan Norman. On a day remembered as "the Midnight Massacre", the Mets fell into last place for several years.

=== 1980s: Success, Wilpon takes over and second World Series championship ===
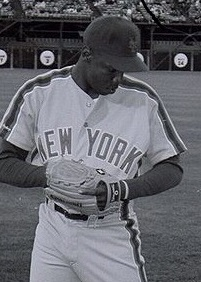
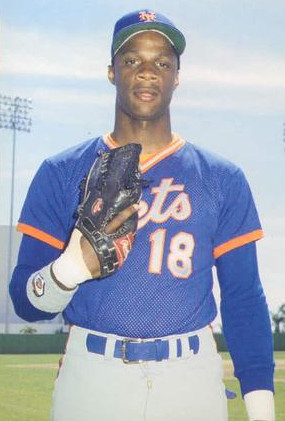
Both Dwight Gooden and Darryl Strawberry became key stars for the Mets during the 1980s

In January 1980, the Payson heirs sold the Mets franchise to the Doubleday publishing company for $21.1 million, a record amount at that time. Nelson Doubleday, Jr. was named chairman of the board while minority shareholder Fred Wilpon took the role of club president. In February, Wilpon hired longtime Baltimore Orioles executive Frank Cashen as general manager who began the process of rebuilding the Mets much in the same way he developed the Orioles in the late 1960s and early 1970s.

The franchise turned around in the mid-1980s. During this time the Mets drafted slugger Darryl Strawberry (#1 in 1980) and 1985 Cy Young Award winner Dwight Gooden (#5 in 1982). Former National League MVP and perennial Gold Glove winner Keith Hernandez was acquired by the Mets in 1983 from the St. Louis Cardinals. This began a rivalry between the two teams that lasted throughout the rest of the 1980s. During this period the teams swapped NL East titles between 1985 and 1988, Mets players openly trolled the Cardinals, and Cardinals fans nicknamed the Mets "pond scum."

After finishing their first three campaigns of the 1980s decade in either 5th or 6th (last) place, in 1984, new manager Davey Johnson was promoted from the helm of the AAA Tidewater Tides. He led the Mets to a second-place, 90–72 record, their first winning season since 1976.

In 1985, they acquired Hall of Fame catcher Gary Carter from the Montreal Expos and won 98 games, but narrowly missed the playoffs. In 1986, they won the division with a record of 108–54, one of the best in National League history. They then won a dramatic NLCS in six games over the Houston Astros. The sixth game of the series lasted sixteen innings, the longest playoff game in history until 2005. The Mets came within one strike of losing the World Series against the Boston Red Sox before a series of hits and defensive miscues ultimately led to an error by Boston's Bill Buckner, which gave the Mets a Game 6 victory. The Mets won their second World Series title in seven games.

In 1987 the Mets declined to re-sign World Series MVP Ray Knight, who then signed with the Baltimore Orioles and also traded away the flexible Kevin Mitchell to the Padres for long-ball threat Kevin McReynolds. Weeks later, Mets' ace Dwight Gooden was admitted to a drug clinic after testing positive for cocaine. Despite Gooden struggling in the first few months of the 1987 season, "Dr. K" rebounded, as did the team. It was during the tough times that the Mets made a great long-term deal, trading Ed Hearn to the Kansas City Royals for pitcher David Cone.

The rivalry with the Cardinals culminated in the 1987 season, when the Mets surged to challenge them for the NL East title but suffered two painful losses. The first came on ""Seat Cushion Night" where Tom Herr hit a walk-off grand slam. A greater loss came on September 11 in a game against St. Louis, 3rd baseman Terry Pendleton hit a homer to give the Cardinals a lead, and eventually the NL East title. One highlight of the year was Darryl Strawberry and Howard Johnson becoming the first teammates ever to hit 30 homers and steal 30 bases in the same season.

The Mets rebounded the following year to post a 100–60 overall record and win their division in 1988, but lost in the NLCS that year to the Los Angeles Dodgers and declined in the 1990s.

=== 1990s: Struggles and return to the postseason ===
==== 1991–1992 ====
During the 1991 season, the Mets were actually in contention for much of the season, closing to within 2.5 games of the front-running Pirates at one point. In the latter half, however, the bottom completely fell out and Harrelson was fired with a week left to go in the season, replaced by third base coach Mike Cubbage for the final games. Gregg Jefferies, once considered a promising young player, became a distraction after releasing a controversial statement to be read on WFAN radio:

When a pitcher is having trouble getting players out, when a hitter is having trouble hitting, or when a player makes an error, I try to support them in whatever way I can. I don't run to the media to belittle them or to draw more attention to their difficult times. I can only hope that one day those teammates who have found it convenient to criticize me will realize that we are all in this together. If only we can concentrate more on the games, rather than complaining and bickering and pointing fingers, we would all be better off.

This was seen as the end for Jefferies in New York as he would be traded to the Kansas City Royals in the offseason. The season ended on a high note, however, as David Cone pitched a one-hit shutout against the Phillies at Veterans Stadium, striking out 19 batters, tying the National League regulation game record (first set by former Met Tom Seaver). With all of the personal problems swirling around the Mets after the 1986 championship, the Mets tried to rebuild using experienced superstars. They signed Eddie Murray for over $3 million, Bobby Bonilla for over $6 million. They also traded McReynolds and Jefferies for one-time World Series hero Bret Saberhagen and his $3 million contract, along with signing veteran free agent pitcher Frank Tanana for $1.5 million. The rebuilding effort was supported by the slogan, "Hardball Is Back".

The experiment of building a team via free agency quickly flopped as Saberhagen and Vince Coleman were soon injured and spent more time on the disabled list than on the field, and Bonilla exhibited unprofessional behavior towards members of the press, once threatening a reporter by saying, "I'll show you The Bronx". At the beginning of the 1991 season, Coleman, Gooden and outfielder Daryl Boston were named in an alleged sexual abuse incident against a woman near the Mets' spring training facility; the charges were later dropped. Meanwhile, popular pitcher David Cone was dealt to the Toronto Blue Jays during the 1992 season for Ryan Thompson and Jeff Kent. While the move was widely criticized by fans of both teams, the Jays went on to win the 1992 World Series. Their descent was chronicled by the book The Worst Team Money Could Buy: The Collapse Of The New York Mets (ISBN 0-8032-7822-5) by Mets beat writers Bob Klapisch and John Harper.

==== 1993 ====
The lowest point of the experiment was the 1993 season when the Mets lost 103 games. In April of that year, Coleman accidentally hit Gooden's shoulder with a golf club while practicing his swing. In July, Saberhagen threw a firecracker under a table near reporters. Their young pitching prospect Anthony Young started the 1993 season at 0–13 and his overall streak of 27 straight losses over two years set a new record. After Young's record-setting loss, Coleman threw a firecracker out of the team bus window and injured three people resulting in felony charges that effectively ended his Mets career; the Mets placed him on paid administrative leave for the remainder of the season, and announced less than a month before the end of the season that he would never play for them again. Only a few days later, Saberhagen was in trouble again, this time for spraying bleach at three reporters. The meltdown season resulted in the worst record for a Mets team since 1965. In addition, two of the three remaining links to the 1986 team, Howard Johnson and Sid Fernandez, departed after the season via free agency.

==== 1994 shortened season ====
The following season saw some promise for the troubled Mets, as first baseman Rico Brogna and second baseman Jeff Kent became fan favorites with their solid glove work and potential 20–25 home run power, Bonilla started to become the player the Mets expected, and a healthy Saberhagen, along with promising young starter Bobby Jones and John Franco, bolstered the Mets pitching staff along. When the strike-shortened 1994 season ended August 12 the Mets were in third place behind first-place Montreal and Atlanta.

=== 1995–1997: Working their way back ===
==== 1995 season ====
When the strike finally ended in 1995, the Mets finally showed some promise again, finishing in 2nd place (but still 6 games under .500) behind eventual World Series champion Atlanta.

The 1995 season marked the emergence of pitchers Bill Pulsipher, Jason Isringhausen, and Paul Wilson. The trio were dubbed Generation K, a group of talented young hurlers who were destined to bring the Mets into greatness, much like Tom Seaver, Jerry Koosman and Nolan Ryan did in the 1960s. However, all three players succumbed to injuries, preventing them from reaching their full potential. Of the three of them, only Isringhausen would accomplish much of significance in the majors, but as a reliever, eventually reaching 300 career saves.

==== 1996 season ====
The Mets dismal 1996 season was highlighted by the play of switch hitting catcher Todd Hundley breaking the Major League Baseball single season record for home runs hit by a catcher with 41. Center fielder Lance Johnson set single-season franchise records in hits (227), triples (21), at bats (682), runs scored (117). Johnson's 21 triples also led the National League, the highest total by an NL player since 1930.

==== 1997 ====
In the offseason, the Mets acquired first baseman John Olerud from the Toronto Blue Jays for pitcher Robert Person.

In 1997, the Mets bounced back with an 88–74 record, missing the playoffs by only four games, and the team improved by 17 wins from 1996. On June 16, the Mets beat the New York Yankees at Yankee Stadium in the first ever regular-season game played between the crosstown rivals 6–0. Mets starter Dave Mlicki pitched a complete game shutout to pick up the win. In 1997, Hundley's great season was derailed by a devastating elbow injury and required Tommy John surgery.

==== 1998 ====
The Mets season in 1998 began with an unforgettable opening day game at Shea Stadium on March 31 against their division rival Philadelphia Phillies, marking the first time that a regular season baseball game was played in New York in March. Both of them were involved in the longest scoreless opening day game in the National League and the longest one in the MLB since 1926 when the Washington Senators beat the Philadelphia Athletics 1–0 in 15 innings. The Mets won the game 1–0 in 14 innings when backup catcher Alberto Castillo delivered a full-count, two-out, pinch-hit single to right with the bases loaded off Philadelphia closer Ricky Bottalico.

During the season, the Mets acquired Mike Piazza in a blockbuster trade that immediately brought star power and credibility to the Mets that had been lacking in recent years.

After the Piazza trade, the Mets played well, but missed the 1998 postseason by only one game. With five games left in the season, the Mets could not win a single game against both the Montreal Expos at home and the Atlanta Braves on the road. Following the 1998 season, the Mets re-signed Mike Piazza to a seven-year, $91 million contract and the Mets traded Todd Hundley to the Los Angeles Dodgers. Trades netted the Mets Roger Cedeño, Armando Benítez, and the Mets signed free agents Robin Ventura, Rickey Henderson, and Bobby Bonilla.

==== 1999 ====
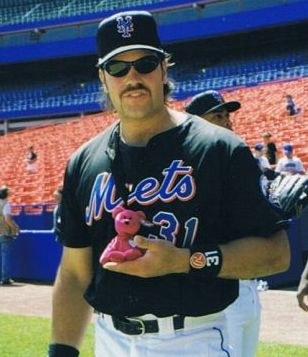
Hall of Fame catcher Mike Piazza in 1999

The Mets started the 1999 season well, going 17–9, but after an eight-game losing streak, including the last two to the New York Yankees, the Mets fired their entire coaching staff except for manager Bobby Valentine. The Mets, in front of a national audience on Sunday Night Baseball, beat the New York Yankees 7–2 in a turning point of the 1999 season. Both Mike Piazza and Robin Ventura had MVP-caliber seasons and Benny Agbayani emerged as an important role player. It was a breakout year for Mets second baseman Edgardo Alfonzo and Roger Cedeño, who broke the single season steals record for the Mets.

After the regular season ended, the Mets played a one-game playoff against the Cincinnati Reds, Al Leiter pitched the best game of his Met career as he hurled a two-hit complete-game shutout to advance the Mets to the playoffs. In the NLDS, the Mets defeated the Arizona Diamondbacks 3 games to 1. The series-clinching victory included a walk-off home run by backup catcher Todd Pratt. The Mets would lose however in the 1999 National League Championship Series to the Atlanta Braves, in six exciting games which included the famous Grand Slam Single by Robin Ventura to win game 5 for the Mets. The Mets were at one point down 3–0 in the series.

The Mets struggled for much of the 1990s, finishing with a losing record for six consecutive seasons between 1991 and 1996.

=== 2000s: The Subway World Series and new ballpark ===
In 2000, the Mets finished the season with a 94–68 record and clinched a wild card spot in the playoffs. In the NLDS, the Mets defeated the San Francisco Giants 3–1 in the series and the St Louis Cardinals in the NLCS. After winning the National League pennant, the Mets earned a trip to the 2000 World Series against their crosstown rivals, the New York Yankees, for a "Subway Series". The Mets were defeated by the Yankees in five games. The most memorable moment of the 2000 World Series occurred during the first inning of Game 2 at Yankee Stadium. Piazza fouled off a pitch which shattered his bat, sending a piece of the barrel toward the pitcher's mound. Pitcher Roger Clemens seized the piece and hurled it in the direction of Piazza as the catcher trotted to first base. Benches briefly cleared before the game was resumed with no ejections.

During the 2001 season, the Mets finished with a record of 82–80 finishing third in the division. After the September 11 terrorist attacks Shea Stadium was used as a relief center and then saw the first sporting event in New York City since the attacks, in a game vs. the Atlanta Braves on September 21. In the bottom of the 8th inning the Mets were trailing 2–1 when Mike Piazza came to bat with a runner on first. Piazza dramatically sent Shea into a frenzy by crushing a home run to give the Mets a 3–2 lead and the eventual win. The game is considered to be one of the greatest moments in the history of the franchise.

In 2002, despite the off-season signings of Tom Glavine, Mo Vaughn, and Roberto Alomar, the Mets finished the 2002 season with a 75–86 overall record and last in the NL East. During that same season the Mets dealt with off field distractions when co-owners Wilpon and Doubleday were in a legal battle which was later settled with Wilpon becoming the sole owner on August 23 that year.

In the aftermath of the 2004 season, the Mets hired a new general manager, Omar Minaya, who immediately turned the franchise around by signing pitcher Pedro Martínez and hiring a new manager, Willie Randolph. The Mets finished 2005 four games over .500, and the franchise's resurgence was complete by 2006 as they won 97 games and the NL East title behind new acquisitions Carlos Beltrán and Carlos Delgado, as well as young superstars José Reyes and David Wright. The Mets eventually succumbed to the St. Louis Cardinals in Game 7 of the National League Championship Series.

In 2007, the Mets entered the final 17 games in the season with a seven-game lead in the NL East. But the team went on an ill-timed losing streak, losing 11 of the next 15 games, resulting in the Philadelphia Phillies winning the division by one game.

The Mets held a more modest 3.5-game lead after 145 games of the 2008 season, their final season at Shea Stadium. On June 16, Omar Minaya fired Willie Randolph, Rick Peterson, and Tom Nieto. Jerry Manuel was named interim manager. While their 7–10 mark down the stretch was better than the previous season's 5–12, it still allowed the Phillies to pass them once again for the division crown.

In 2009, the Mets moved into the newly constructed Citi Field. On April 17, Gary Sheffield, who just days earlier was signed by the Mets as a free agent, hit his 500th home run against the Milwaukee Brewers. Sheffield became the first pinch hitter to reach this milestone, as well as the first to do it in a Mets uniform. The season was mainly a tough one for the Mets which was marred by numerous injuries suffered by its players, with 20 of them having been on the disabled list at one point or another during the season and losing star (and also replacement) players like J. J. Putz, John Maine, Óliver Pérez, José Reyes, Carlos Beltrán, David Wright, Carlos Delgado, Johan Santana, and Gary Sheffield.

As a result, the Mets finished in fourth place, with a record of 70–92 and failed to qualify for the playoffs for the third straight season. Mets players spent more than 1,480 days in the disabled list in 2009, more than any other team in the majors. Second-half turnarounds of Jeff Francoeur and Daniel Murphy helped the Mets finish the season with the best batting average in the National League, tied with the Los Angeles Dodgers.

=== 2010s: Wilpon sells the team and fifth trip to the World Series ===
In 2012, Mets owners Fred Wilpon and Saul Katz settled a lawsuit brought against them on behalf of the victims of Bernard Madoff's Ponzi scheme for $162 million. As a result of this agreement the liquidator, Irving Picard, agreed to drop the charges that Wilpon and Katz blindly went along with the scheme for their personal benefit. Picard had originally sought to recover $1 billion from the Wilpon family and Katz, but settled for $162 million along with the admission that neither the Wilpons nor Katz had any knowledge of the Ponzi scheme. In 2011–2012, Mets ownership sold twelve minority 4% shares (totaling 48%) of the franchise at $20 million apiece to provide a cash infusion of $240 million for the team.

Though the first half of the 2010s saw limited success for the Mets, who failed to finish with a winning record between 2009 and 2014, this period coincided with a number of milestones for the franchise, including the first no-hitter in franchise history by Johan Santana in 2012. R.A. Dickey won the NL Cy Young Award pitching for the Mets that same season.

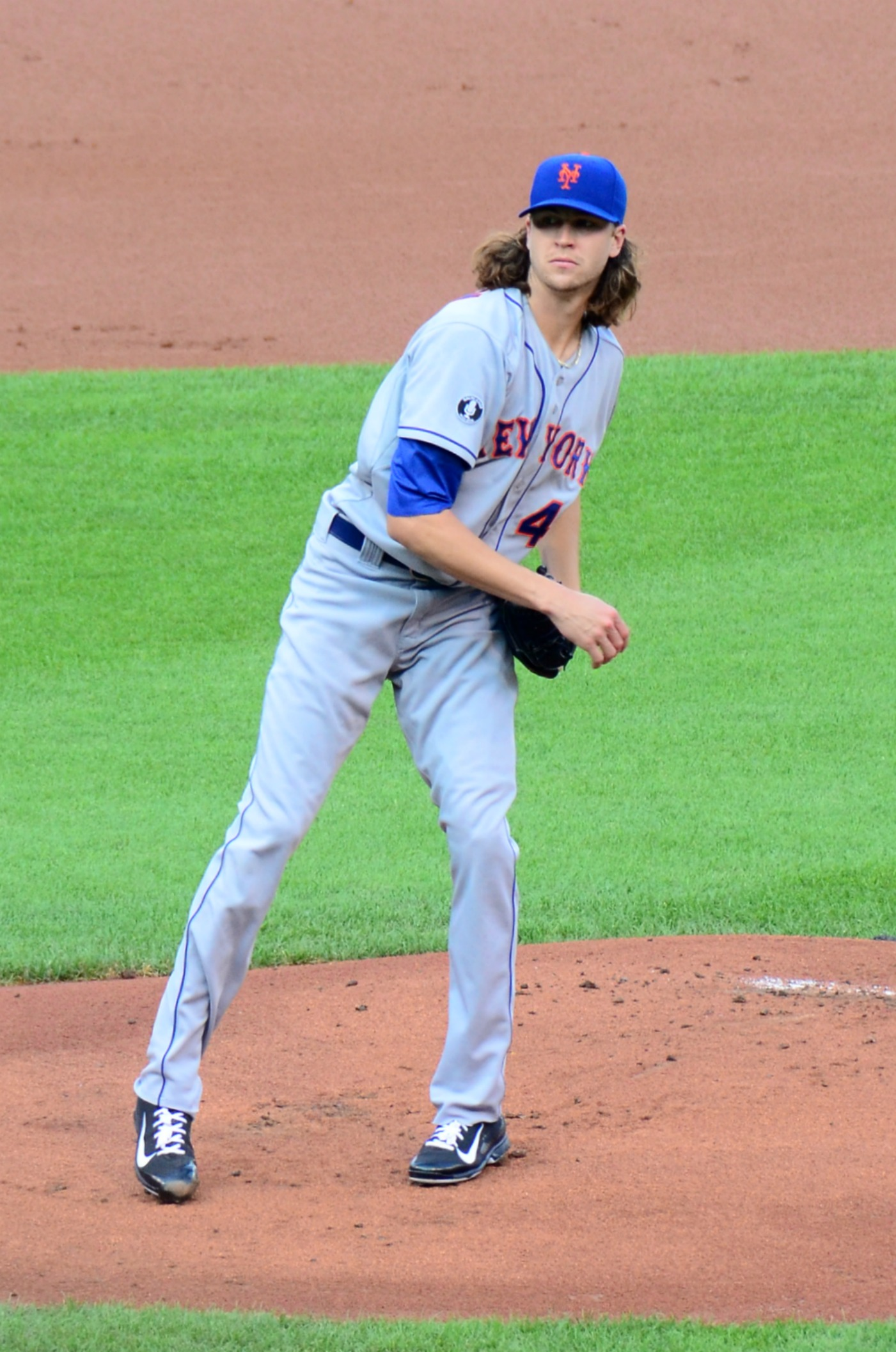
Jacob deGrom, the 2014 Rookie of the Year and 2018 and 2019 Cy Young Award Winner

On September 26, 2015, the Mets clinched the NL East division title, and thus their first postseason berth since 2006, by defeating the Cincinnati Reds 10–2. They defeated the Los Angeles Dodgers in the NLDS, three games to two, and swept the Chicago Cubs in the NLCS for their first pennant in 15 years. In the 2015 World Series, they were defeated by the Kansas City Royals in five games.

The Mets returned to the postseason in 2016, marking only the second time in franchise history that the team qualified for the postseason in consecutive years. With an 87–75 record, the team qualified for the wild-card game, only to lose 3–0 to the San Francisco Giants. The Mets failed to make the playoffs for the rest of the decade, finishing no higher than third place in 2019 when they finished with a winning record of 86–76 (the highest of any team not to qualify for the postseason).

The end of the decade also coincided with David Wright's retirement, Jacob deGrom being awarded two consecutive Cy Young Awards (including for the 2018 season when the pitcher finished the year with a 1.70 ERA) and first-baseman Pete Alonso winning the 2019 Rookie of the Year Award and finishing the season with a major-league-leading 53 home runs, the most by any rookie in MLB history. On October 3, 2019, the Mets fired manager Mickey Callaway. On November 1, 2019, the Mets named Carlos Beltrán as the new manager replacing Callaway.

=== 2020s: Steve Cohen era ===
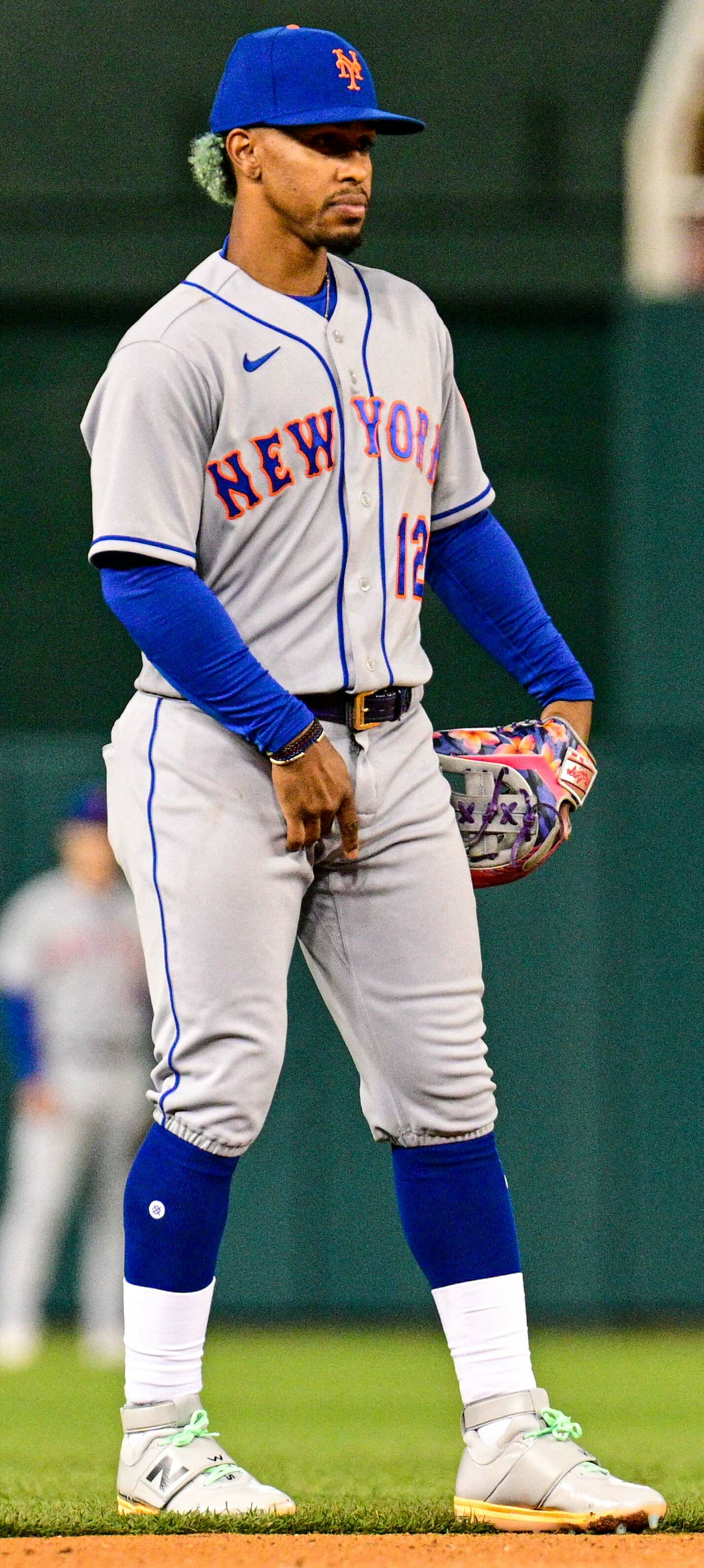
The Mets acquired 4x All-Star shortstop Francisco Lindor in 2021.

On January 16, 2020, Beltrán stepped down as manager before the start of the 2020 MLB season due to his involvement in the Houston Astros sign stealing scandal. Two days later, the Mets hired Luis Rojas as manager. The team finished the shortened 2020 season with a 26–34 record and a last-place finish in the NL East.

On October 30, 2020, Steve Cohen became the majority owner of the Mets, owning 95% of the team, making him the current richest owner in baseball. He bought the team from the Wilpon family for $2.4 billion, with the Wilpons keeping the remaining 5%. On January 7, 2021, the Mets acquired pitcher Carlos Carrasco and All-Star shortstop Francisco Lindor in a trade with the Cleveland Indians. On March 31, Lindor and the Mets agreed to a 10-year extension worth $341 million. At the trade deadline, the Mets acquired All-Star infielder & World Series champion Javier Báez in trade with the Chicago Cubs. The Mets finished third place in the NL East with an overall record of 77–85.

On November 19, the Mets hired Billy Eppler as their new general manager. During the offseason, the Mets signed free agents Nick Plummer, Starling Marte, Eduardo Escobar, and Mark Canha. On December 1, the Mets signed three-time Cy Young Award winner Max Scherzer with a three-year, $130 million deal. On December 18, the Mets announced that they hired Buck Showalter as their new manager via owner Steve Cohen's Twitter account.

On April 29, 2022, Tylor Megill, Drew Smith, Joely Rodríguez, Seth Lugo and Edwin Díaz pitched the second no-hitter in franchise history in a 3–0 win against the Philadelphia Phillies. On September 18, during a game against the Pittsburgh Pirates, Jacob deGrom set a new MLB record by allowing three or less earned runs in 40 consecutive games, breaking a record that was held by Jim Scott for over 100 years.

On the following day, the Mets clinched their first postseason berth since 2016, and their 10th in franchise history. On September 25, Pete Alonso broke the Mets single-season RBI record which was previously set by former franchise stars Mike Piazza and David Wright. Also during the season, the Mets called up three of their top prospects Brett Baty, Mark Vientos, and Francisco Álvarez. The Mets won 101 games and tied with the Atlanta Braves for the best record in the NL East; however, the Mets were designated as a Wild Card team due to them getting swept by the Braves. The Mets lost the 2022 National League Wild Card Series to the San Diego Padres. They also became the first team in MLB history to produce only one hit in a winner-take-all playoff game.

In the offseason, the Mets lost deGrom to the Texas Rangers via free agency, but quickly replaced him by signing Japanese ace Kodai Senga to a five-year, $75 million contract, and three-time Cy Young Award winner Justin Verlander to a two-year, $86.7 million contract. Despite this the Mets were unable to gain momentum from the previous season and missed the playoffs in the process. The team ended the 2023 season with a 75–87 record and finished fourth-place in the NL East.

On September 12, 2023, the Mets hired David Stearns as their new president of baseball operations. On October 1, after the final game of the season, the Mets fired manager Buck Showalter. They would then introduce their new president Stearns on the following day. On October 5, Billy Eppler resigned as general manager. On November 13, the Mets named former New York Yankees bench coach Carlos Mendoza as their new manager. During the offseason, the Mets signed free agents Luis Severino, Joey Wendle, Jorge López, Harrison Bader and Sean Manaea.

==== 2024 ====
In the 2024 season, the Mets started off with a dismal 22–33 record. However, after a players-only meeting was held by shortstop Francisco Lindor on May 29, the Mets significantly improved the rest of the way, mainly from the McDonald's character Grimace putting the Mets on a winning path, and the song "OMG" by infielder Jose Iglesias under the stage name Candelita, becoming a rallying cry for the whole team. The Mets finished with a record of 89–73 and qualified for the playoffs for the second time in three years. They reached as far as the 2024 National League Championship Series before losing to the eventual World Series champion Los Angeles Dodgers in six games.

On December 8, 2024, the Mets signed superstar outfielder Juan Soto to a 15-year, $765 million contract in the offseason, the largest contract in professional sports history. It is also said that the contract has ushered in a new era in Mets history and in all of New York baseball.

==== 2025–present ====
Despite the acquisition of Juan Soto, the Mets underwent a historic collapse in the 2025 season. While the Mets attained a record of 45–24 by June 12, the Mets went 38–55 down the stretch, and ended up losing their playoff spot to the Cincinnati Reds. Following the season, David Stearns got rid of a large chunk of the older core, including letting Edwin Diaz and Pete Alonso sign with other teams, and trading Brandon Nimmo and Jeff McNeil.

During Spring Training for the 2026 season, Steve Cohen announced that he would not name a team captain as long as the team was under his ownership. From April 8–21 the team went on 12-game losing streak, finally breaking it against the Minnesota Twins on April 22 with a 3–2 win. It was the longest losing streak experienced by the team since 2004.

On June 26, 2026, the Mets fired manager Carlos Mendoza and was replaced by Andy Green.

== World Series championships ==
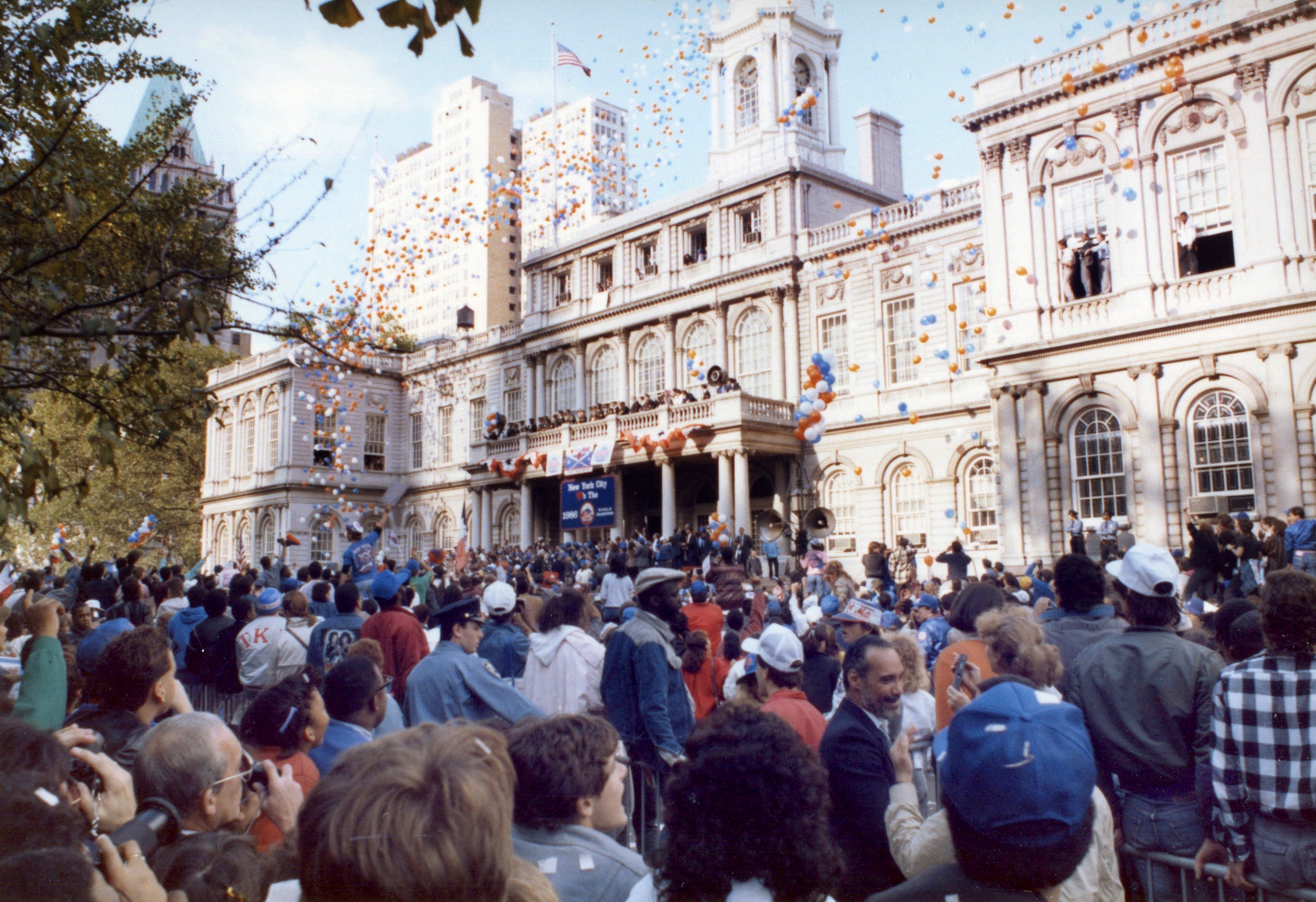
Mets' fans celebrating the 1986 championship team at New York City Hall

Throughout the 60-year history of the franchise, the Mets have won two World Series championships in total.

Season	Manager	Opponent	Series Score	Record
1969	Gil Hodges	Baltimore Orioles	4–1	100–62
1986	Davey Johnson	Boston Red Sox	4–3	108–54
Total World Series championships:				2

== Culture ==
=== Fan support ===
In 1998, the Independent Budget Office of the city of New York published a study on the economic effect of the city's two Major League Baseball teams. The study found that 43% of Mets fans lived in one of the five boroughs of New York, 39% in the tri-state area outside the city, and 12% elsewhere. Mets fans were more likely to be found in Queens, Brooklyn, and the Long Island counties of Nassau and Suffolk. Mets, Yankees, and Toronto Blue Jays fans are shared in Western New York. Notable fans of the Mets include Jerry Seinfeld, Kevin James, Julia Stiles, Ty Burrell, Bill Maher, Ben Stiller, Jimmy Kimmel, Hank Azaria, Jim Breuer, Jon Stewart, Chris Rock, Matthew Broderick, Dylan O'Brien, Glenn Close, Billy Joel, Ad-Rock, MCA, Nas, 50 Cent, Nicki Minaj, Chris Christie, Patrick Mahomes, and Donovan Mitchell.

=== The 7 Line Army ===
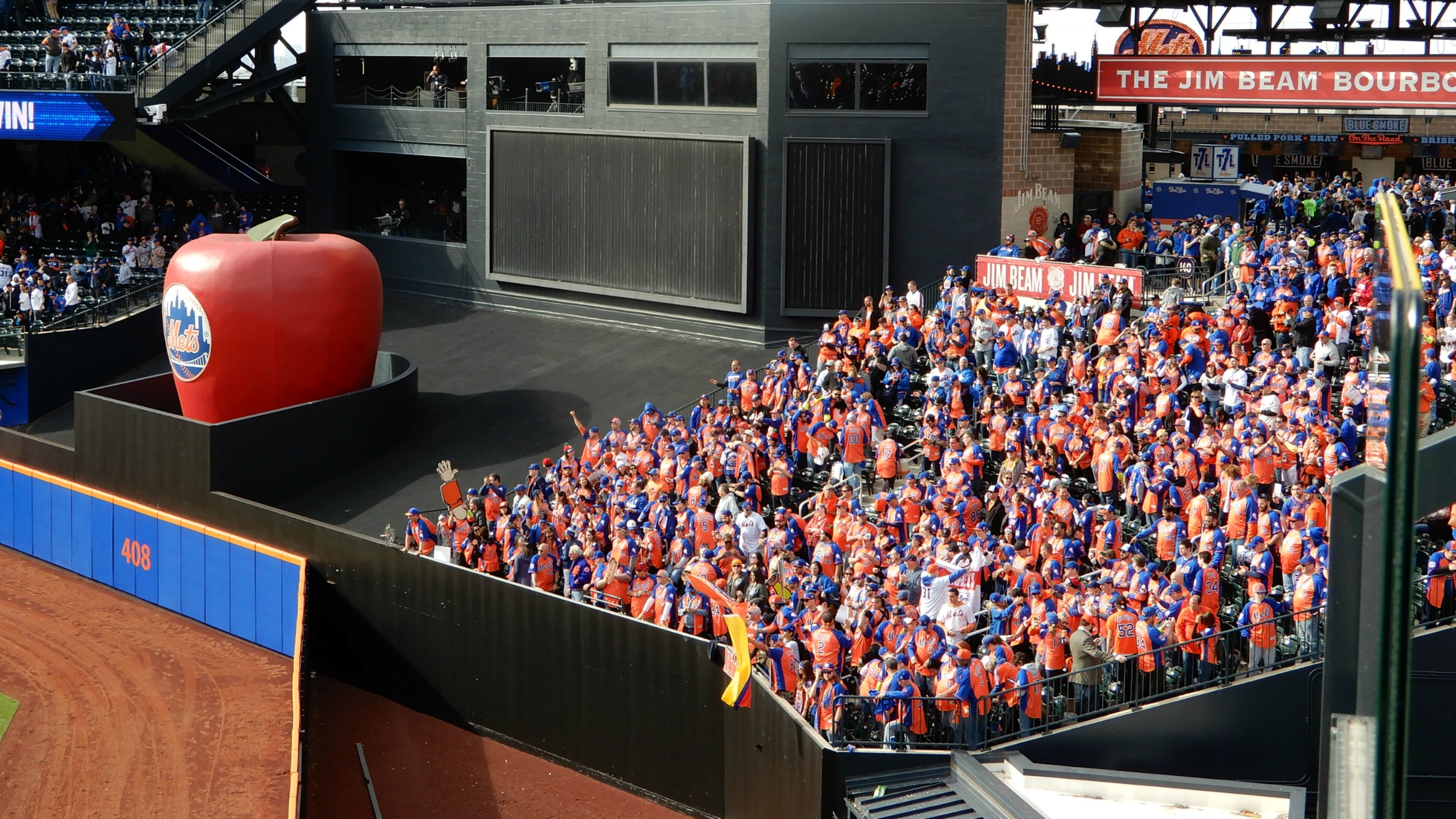
The 7 Line Army in 2017

The "7 Line Army" are a group primarily consisting of passionate and die-hard Mets fans occupying the Big Apple Section of Citi Field during home games for the Mets. The group was founded in 2012 by Darren Meenan who owns The 7 Line, an apparel company that produces Mets-themed clothing.

=== Mascots ===
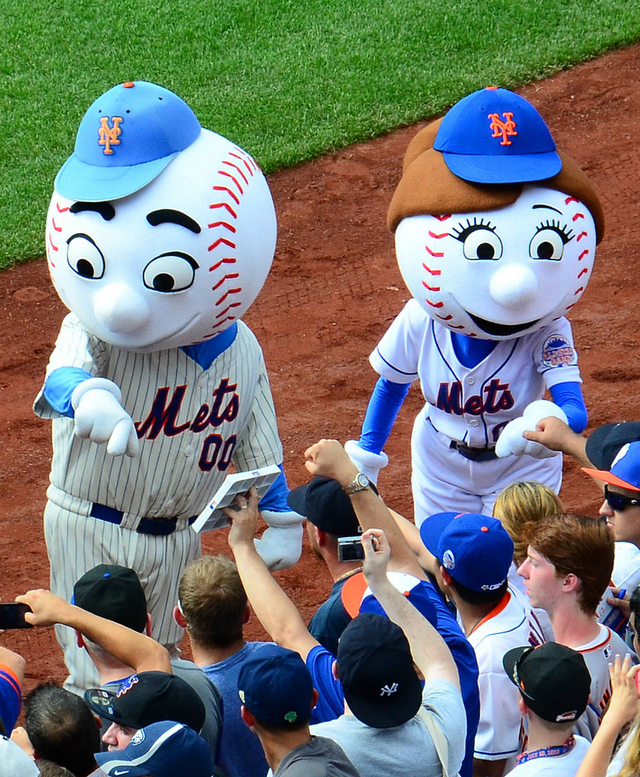
Mr. & Mrs. Met greeting Mets Fans.

Mr. Met is the official mascot of the New York Mets. He was introduced on the cover of game programs in 1963, when the Mets were still playing at the Polo Grounds in northern Manhattan. When the Mets moved to Shea Stadium in 1964, fans were introduced to a live costumed version. Mr. Met is believed to have been the first mascot in Major League Baseball to exist in human (as opposed to artistically rendered) form.

Mrs. Met (formerly Lady Met) is the female counterpart to Mr. Met, and the couple sometimes appears with 2–3 smaller "children".

The Mets have had two mascots other than Mr. and Mrs. Met at different points in its history. The franchise's original official mascot was Homer, a beagle trained by Rudd Weatherwax that lived at the Waldorf-Astoria, was sponsored by Rheingold Beer and had his own platform behind home plate at the Polo Grounds. The dog was not included in the transition to Shea Stadium. The brainchild of team owner Lorinda de Roulet's daughter Bebe, Mettle the mule represented the Mets for only the 1979 season. The name was the result of a contest won by Dolores Mapps of Mercerville, New Jersey whose explanation was that it typified the team's "spirit, ardor, stamina and courage, all of which the Mets have in abundance." Mettle was not retained after the franchise was sold to Nelson Doubleday Jr. and Fred Wilpon the following year.

=== Theme song ===
"Meet the Mets" is the Mets' signature song, written in 1961, one year before the first season, by Bill Katz and Ruth Roberts. It is played on the radio, during television broadcasts and at Mets' home games. Other songs traditionally sung at Mets home games include "Take Me Out to the Ball Game" and the Sicilian song "Lazy Mary" during the seventh-inning stretch and Billy Joel's "Piano Man" in the middle of the eighth inning.

=== "Let's go Mets" meme ===
In 2021, an internet meme involving the fan chant "let's go, Mets" began spreading through social media, particularly Twitter and TikTok. The meme is largely based around fictional characters unexpectedly expressing support for the team, such as Kingpin from Spider-Man: Into The Spider-Verse and characters from the video game Genshin Impact.

== Uniform and logo symbolism ==
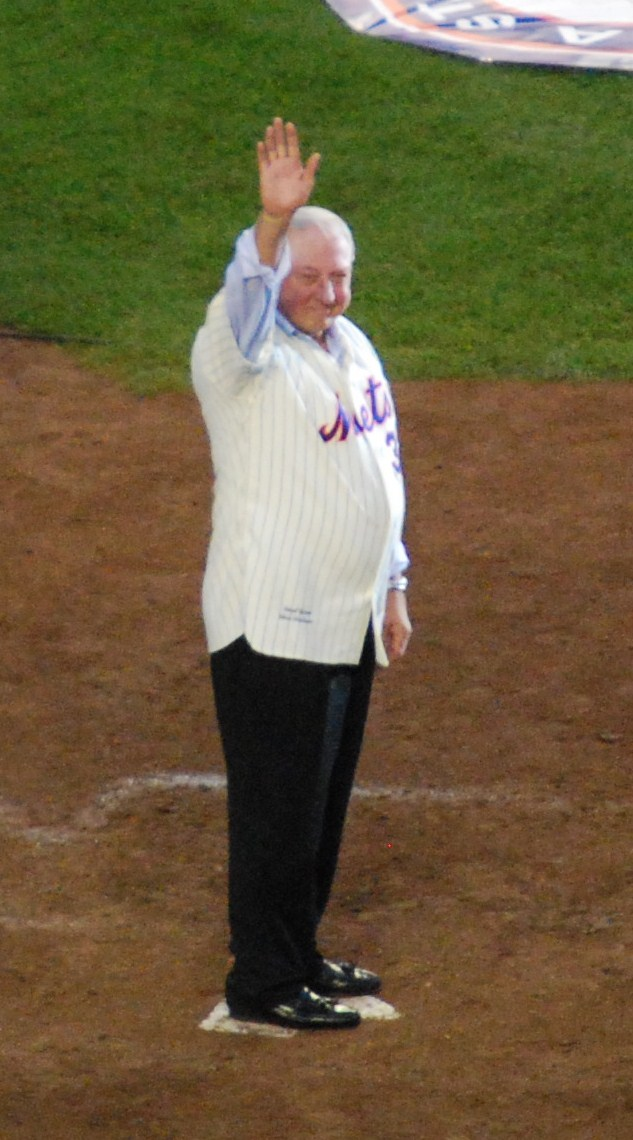
Jerry Koosman wearing his late-1960s' era Mets jersey, which served as an inspiration for the 2012–13 Mets pinstriped uniform.

The Mets' colors are blue and orange, originally chosen to honor the city's history of National League baseball; blue for the Brooklyn Dodgers, and orange for the New York Giants. Blue and orange are also the colors of New York City, as seen on its flag.

In 1998, black was added to the color scheme. Beginning with 2012 the black elements in the uniform began to be phased out, and were eliminated in 2013. In 2021, the team reintroduced black in their alternate uniforms.

=== Logo ===
Cap insignia

Team Logo

The primary logo, designed by sports cartoonist Ray Gotto, consists of "Mets" written in orange script trimmed in white across a blue representation of the New York City skyline with a white suspension bridge in the foreground, all contained in an orange circle with orange baseball stitching across the image. Each part of the skyline has special meaning—at the left is a church spire, symbolic of Brooklyn, the borough of churches; the second building from the left is the Williamsburgh Savings Bank Building, the tallest building in Brooklyn at the time of the team's founding; next is the Woolworth Building; after a general skyline view of midtown comes the Empire State Building; at the far right is the headquarters of the United Nations. The suspension bridge in the center symbolizes that the Mets, by bringing National League baseball back to New York, represent all five boroughs; many of New York's major bridges are suspension designs. In 1999, the logo received a slight alteration; a small "NY" originally placed to the left of the team script was removed.

With the introduction of black as an official color, an alternate team logo was created in 1999. It is identical to the original logo, but the skyline is black instead of blue and the "Mets" script is blue trimmed in orange and white instead of orange trimmed in white (the alternate black jerseys displayed the primary blue and orange logo on the left sleeves in 1998; in 1999 this was changed to the alternate black and blue logo). The logo fell into disuse after the Mets dropped the alternate black jerseys and caps in 2012. When the team brought back the black jerseys in 2021, they feature the blue and orange logo patch instead of the black and blue logo.

Toward the end of the 2014 season, the Mets made a slight alteration to their logo on their Facebook and Twitter accounts. The roof of the building to the far right was tilted, changing it from the United Nations building to the Citigroup Center. Negative fan reaction to this change resulted in the building being immediately reverted to the UN building. No other notable changes have been made to the logo since.

The cap logo consists of an orange, interlocking "NY" identical to the logo used by the New York Giants in their final years, and is on a blue cap reminiscent of the caps worn by the Brooklyn Dodgers.

=== Uniform color and design ===
Currently, the Mets wear an assortment of uniforms.

The home uniforms are white with blue pinstripes and feature "Mets" in blue script with an orange outline across the chest, block letter player names and numbers also in blue with an orange outline and a sleeve patch with the team logo. The uniforms are paired with a blue cap featuring an "NY" logo in orange, plus blue undersleeves, belts and socks.

The road uniforms, introduced in its current form in 2025, are gray with blue, orange and blue stripes on the collar, sleeves and pants and feature a radially-arched "NEW YORK" in Tiffany-style letters across the chest in blue outlined in orange, block letter player numerals and names also in blue outlined in orange and the team logo patch. Like the home uniforms, the road grays are worn with the same blue caps, undersleeves, belts and socks.

The black alternate home jersey, introduced in its current form in 2024, is a modified version of the one worn from 1998 to 2012 and reintroduced for Friday home games in 2021. They feature the "Mets" script and the block letter player names and numbers in blue outlined in orange and the team logo patch. The set is worn with an alternate black cap featuring the "NY" logo in blue trimmed in orange. Belts, undersleeves and socks worn with it are also black. The black alternate home jerseys are worn with plain white pants with blue piping.

The blue alternate road jersey, introduced in 2025, features a pullover jersey with "New York" in script across the chest and block letter player names and numbers in blue with orange outline, with blue, orange and blue stripes on the collar and sleeves and the team logo patch. The blue alternate road jerseys are worn with the same road gray pants with blue, orange and blue stripes and with the blue caps, undersleeves, belts and socks.

The dark gray City Connect jersey with black and purple accents was introduced in 2024. The uniform contains the "NYC" wordmark in black patterned after the team's road uniform, along with black pinstripes and a black subway token patch containing the purple "NY" logo. The dark gray cap features the "NY" logo in black trimmed in white, along with a silhouette of the Queensboro Bridge. The purple color was inspired by the 7 Line that runs to Citi Field.

The Mets' standard blue batting helmet, with the "NY" in metallic orange, is currently used for games worn with the primary home, road and blue alternate jerseys. A black alternate helmet is used in games with the black jerseys, and a dark gray alternate helmet is paired with the City Connect jerseys.

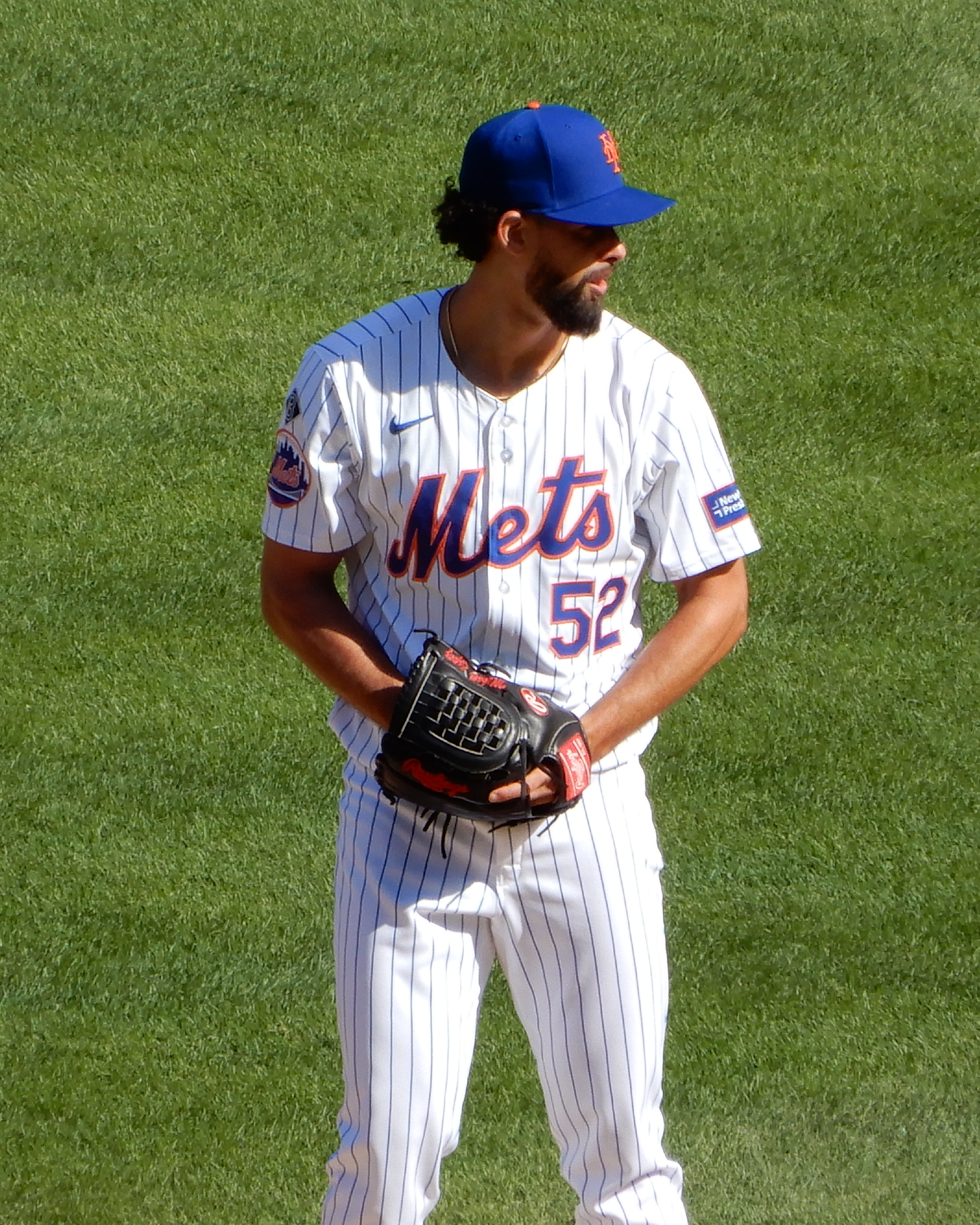
Jorge López wearing the Mets' current home uniform in 2024

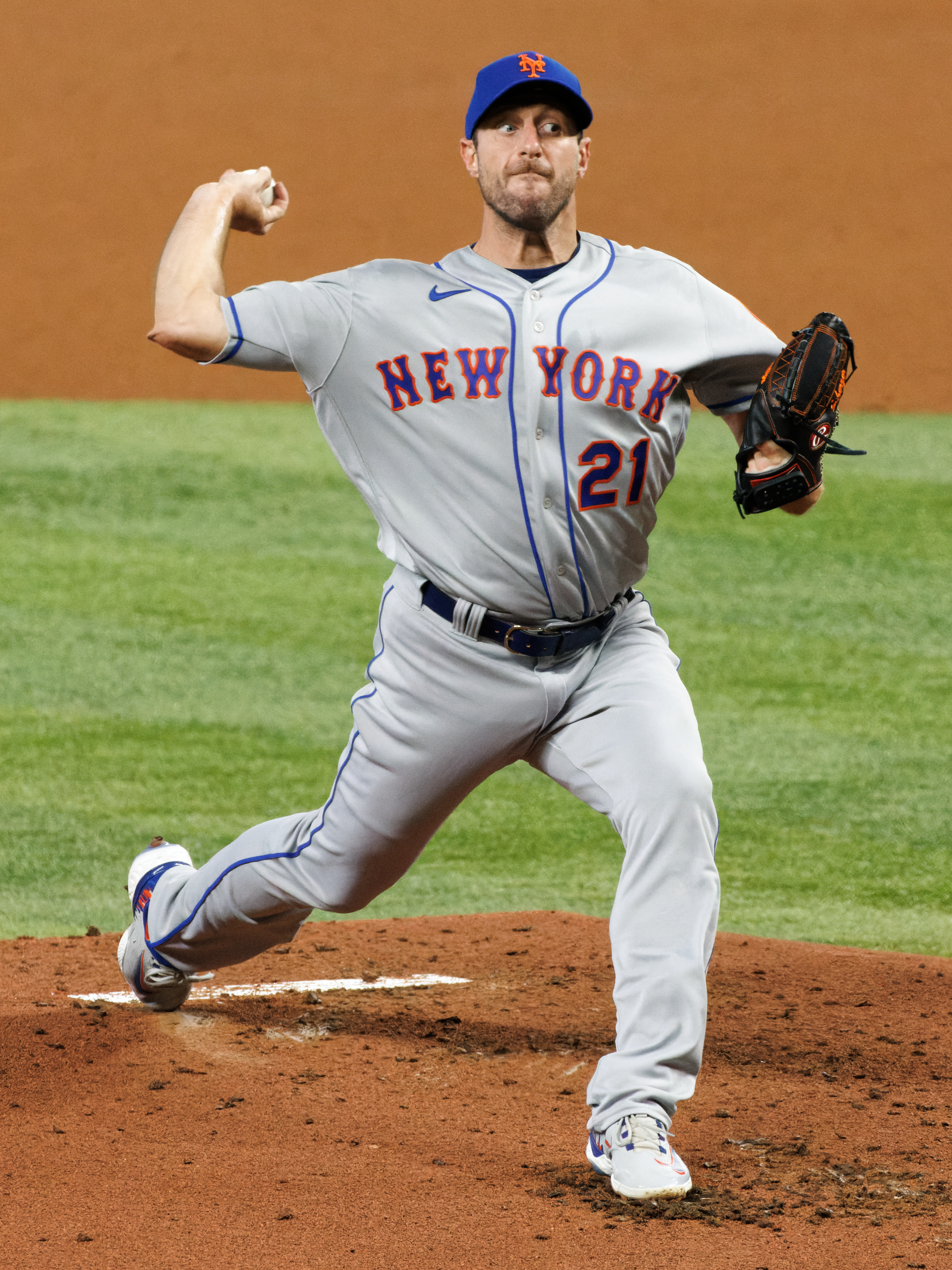
Max Scherzer wearing the Mets' former road uniform in 2023

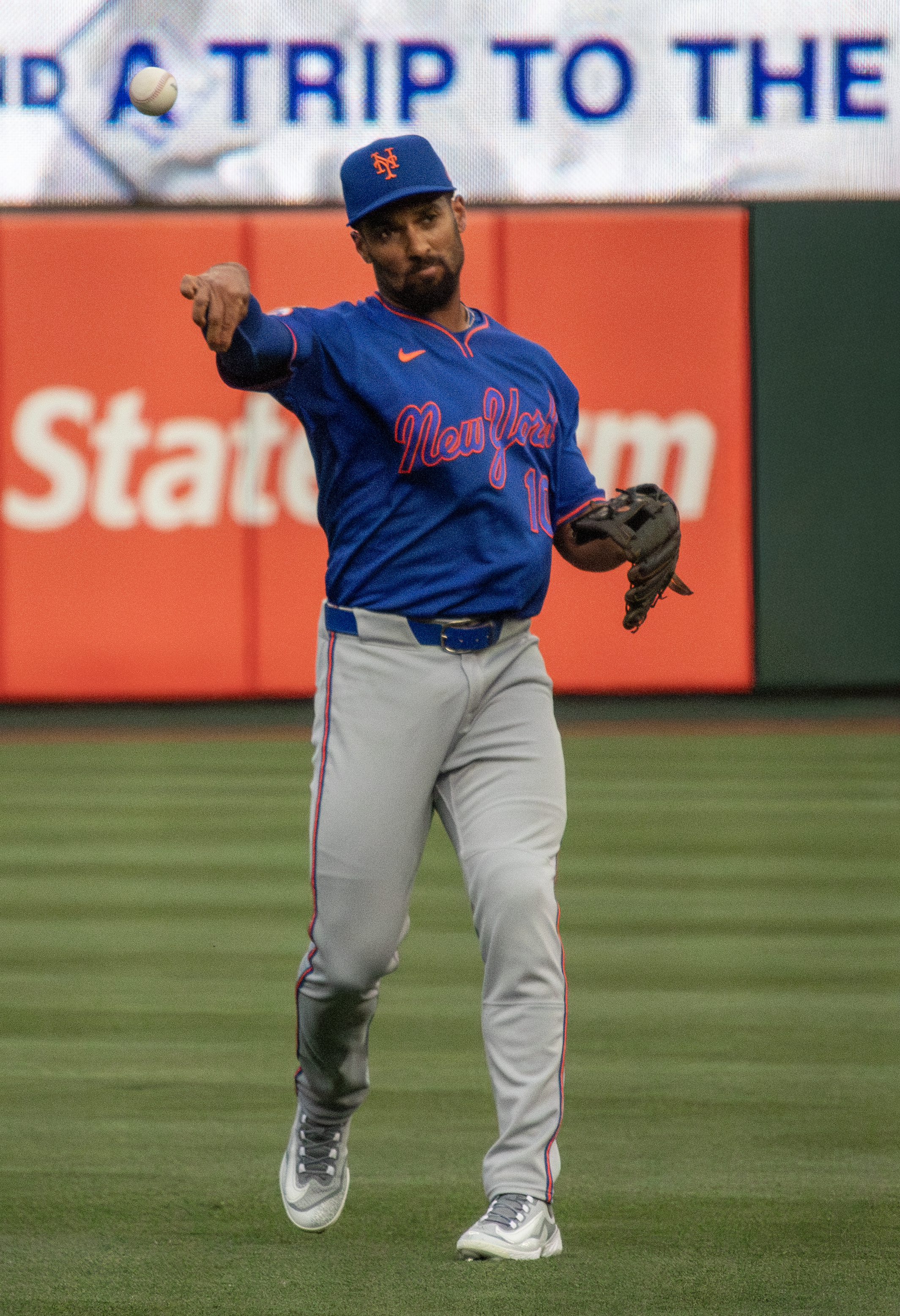
Marcus Semien wearing the Mets' current road blue alternate uniform in 2026

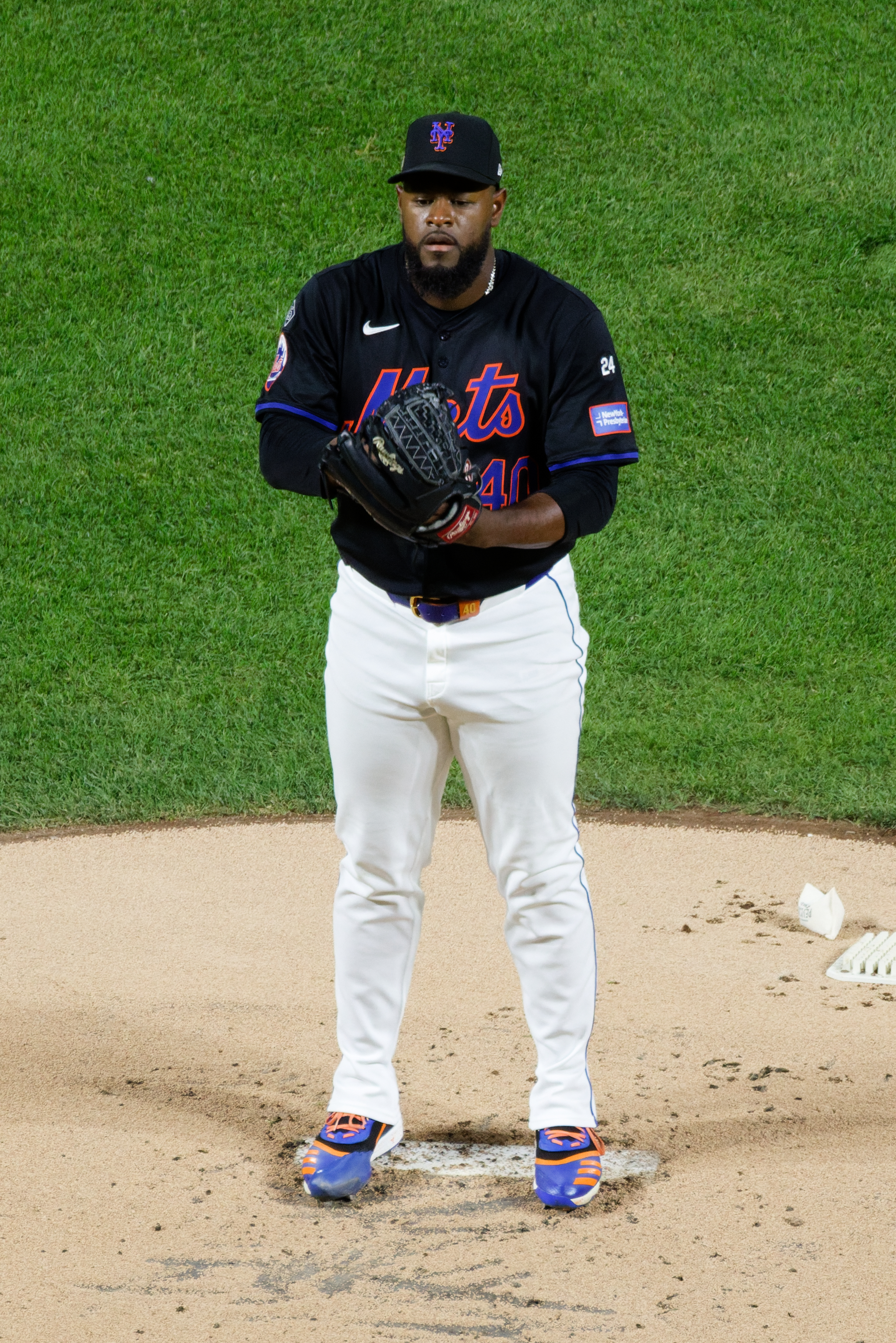
Luis Severino wearing the Mets' current black alternate uniform in 2024

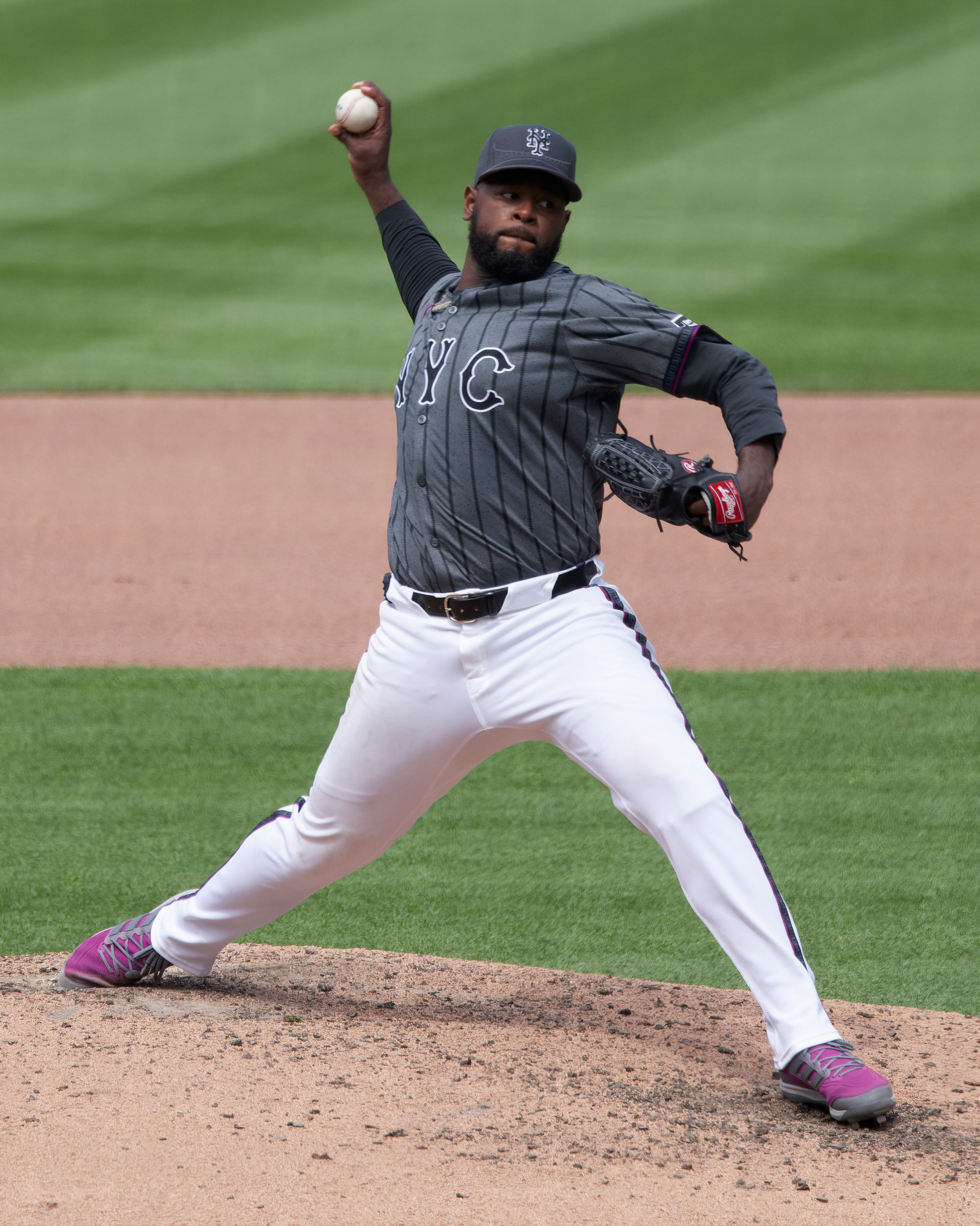
Luis Severino wearing the Mets' City Connect uniform in 2024

== Achievements ==
=== Retired numbers ===
The Mets have retired eleven numbers in the history of the franchise.

David
Wright
3B
Retired July 19, 2025
Gil
Hodges
1B, Manager
Retired June 9, 1973
Carlos
Beltrán
OF
Retired September 19, 2026
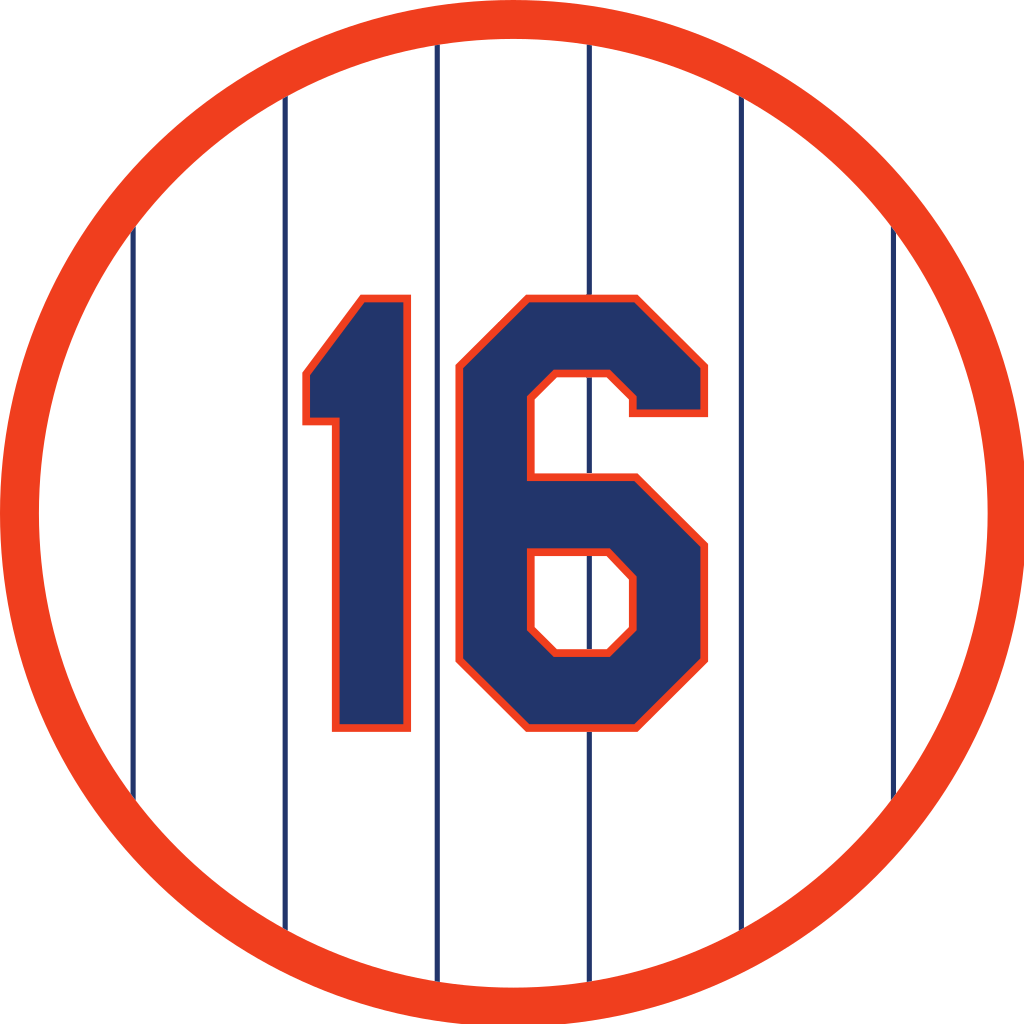
Dwight
Gooden
P
Retired April 14, 2024
Keith
Hernandez
1B
Retired July 9, 2022
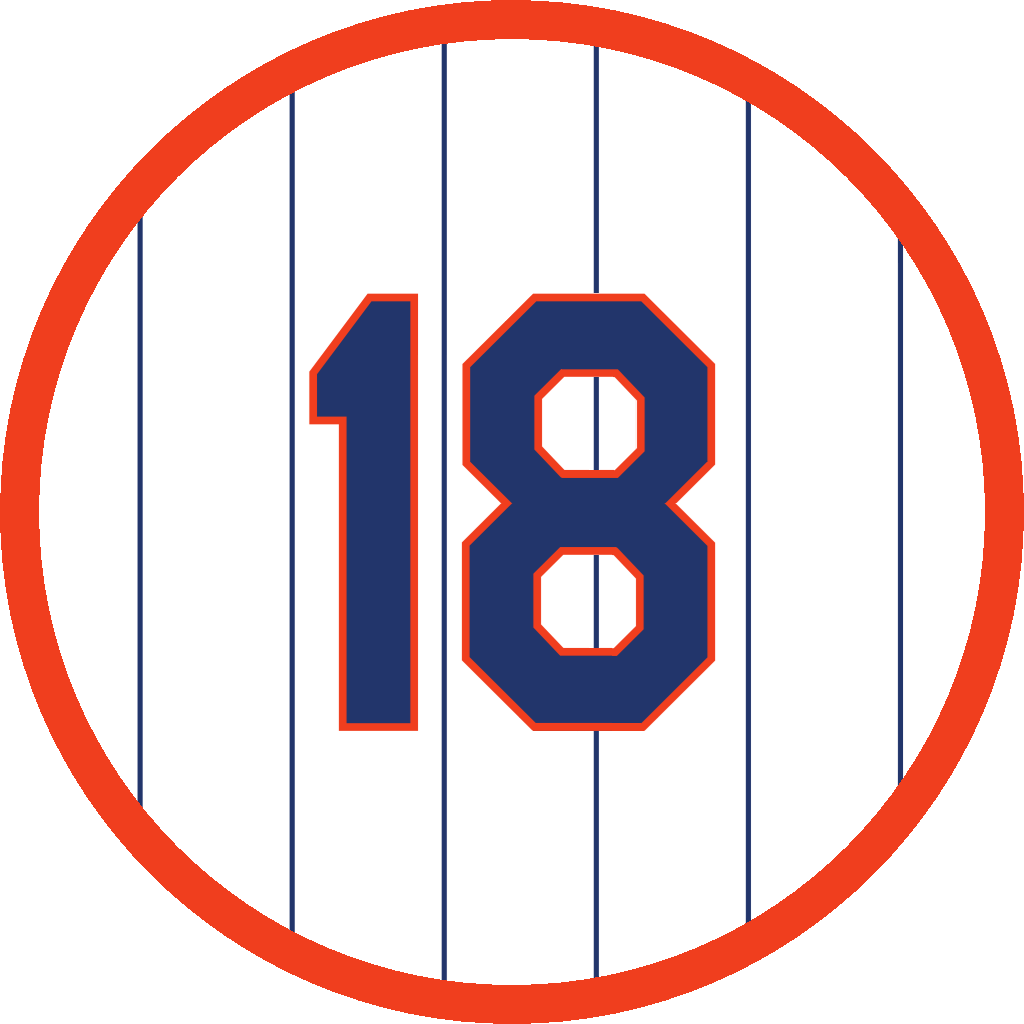
Darryl
Strawberry
RF
Retired June 1, 2024
Willie
Mays
CF, Instructor
Retired August 27, 2022
Mike
Piazza
C
Retired July 30, 2016
Jerry
Koosman
P
Retired August 28, 2021
Casey
Stengel
Manager
Retired September 2, 1965
Tom
Seaver
P
Retired July 24, 1988
Jackie
Robinson
All MLB
Honored April 15, 1997
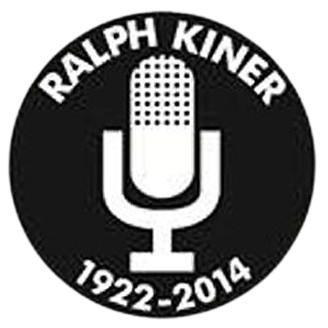
Ralph
Kiner
Broadcaster
Honored March 31, 2014
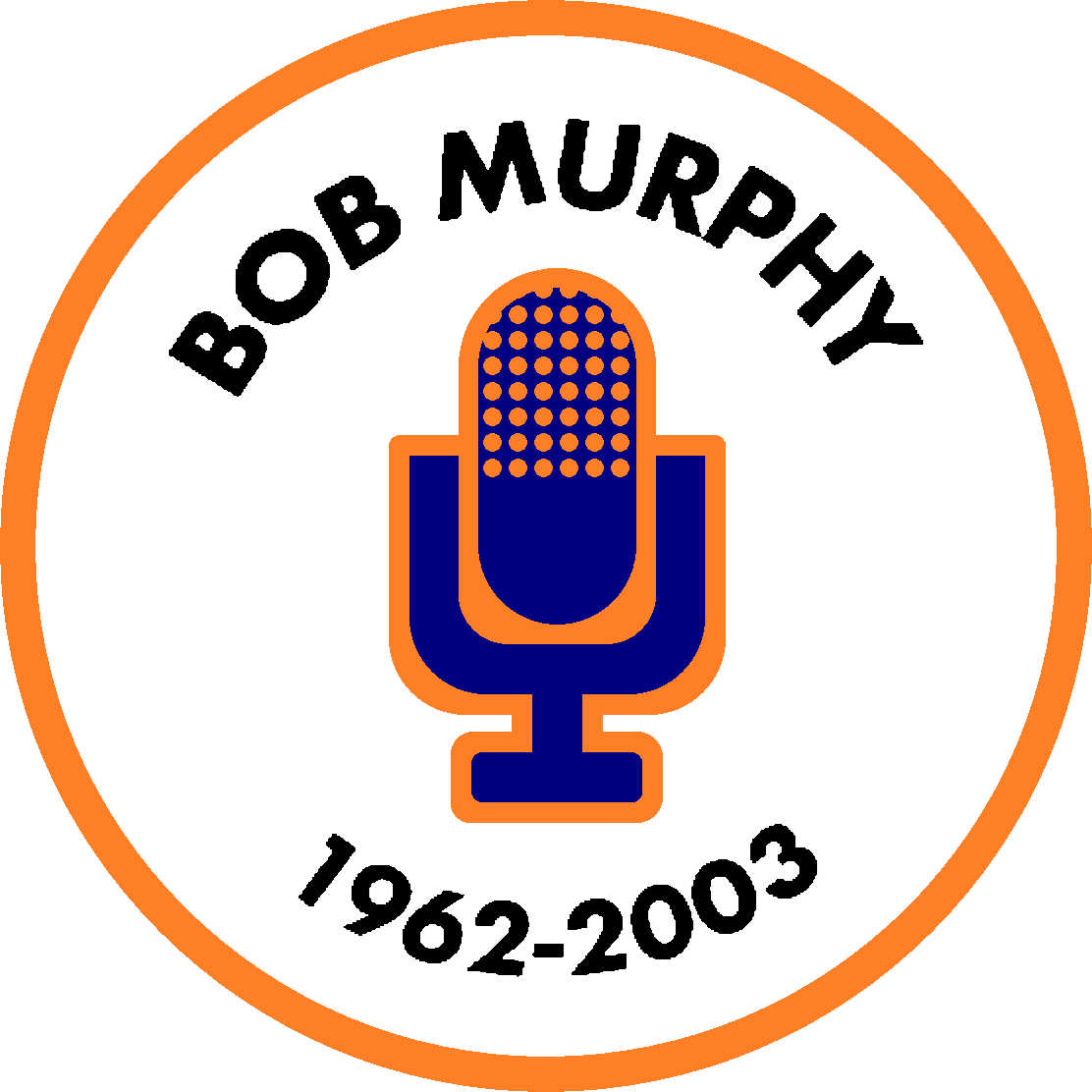
Bob
Murphy
Broadcaster
Honored April 5, 2023
William A.
Shea
Proponent
Honored April 8, 2008

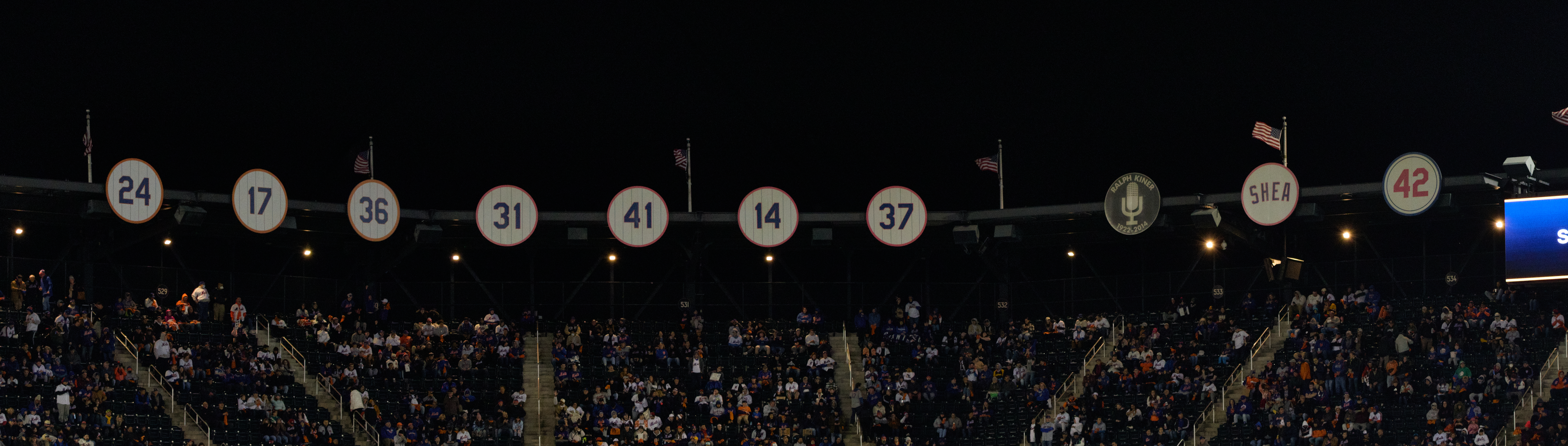
The Mets' retired numbers at Citi Field, 2022

Major League Baseball retired Jackie Robinson's number 42 on April 15, 1997, when the Mets played the Dodgers at Shea Stadium. Butch Huskey wore the number throughout the rest of his Mets career because of a grandfather clause placed on the retired number by MLB. Mo Vaughn also wore 42 during his stint with the Mets, because of the same clause.

On the final opening day at Shea Stadium, April 8, 2008, the Mets unveiled a sign bearing the name "Shea" next to the team's retired numbers honoring William Shea and his contributions to the franchise.

In 2014, a special memorial logo honoring broadcaster Ralph Kiner, depicting a microphone along with his name and the years 1922–2014, was displayed on the left-field wall adjacent to, but not as a part of, the Mets' retired numbers, from 2014 to 2016. In the 2016 Mets yearbook, a sidebar in an article on Mike Piazza's upcoming number retirement implies that Kiner has been "retired" next to William Shea. This was confirmed when the Mets' retired numbers were moved to the roof facade during the 2016 season to accommodate Mike Piazza's number 31; the Kiner logo was placed next to the Shea and Jackie Robinson numbers, no longer separated from the others.

On August 28, 2021, the Mets retired Jerry Koosman's number 36. On July 9, 2022, the Mets retired Keith Hernandez's number 17. That same year, on August 27, the Mets retired Willie Mays' number 24. On April 5, 2023, the Mets honored broadcaster Bob Murphy with a microphone logo alongside Kiner. The Mets retired Dwight Gooden's number 16 on April 14, 2024, and Darryl Strawberry's number 18 later that year on June 1. On July 19, 2025, the Mets retired David Wright's number 5. They retired Carlos Beltrán's number 15 on September 19, 2026.

The uniform number 8 has not been issued since Gary Carter was elected to the Hall of Fame in 2003 as an Expo, after requesting to go in as a Met. When the Mets honored Carter, they did not retire number 8, but instead gave him a replica of his Hall of Fame plaque depicting him as a Met instead of an Expo. Desi Relaford and Matt Galante were the last Mets player and coach, respectively, to wear the number. After Carter's death, the Mets honored him in a ceremony on Opening Day in 2012, where they unveiled the "Kid 8" memorial logo (also worn on the uniform sleeve) on the outfield fence. The number is still not officially retired.

=== Team captains ===
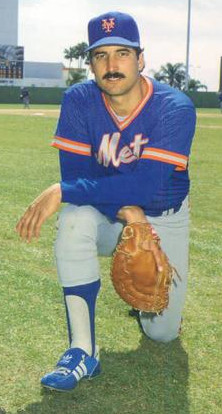
Keith Hernandez served as Mets captain between 1987 & 1989.

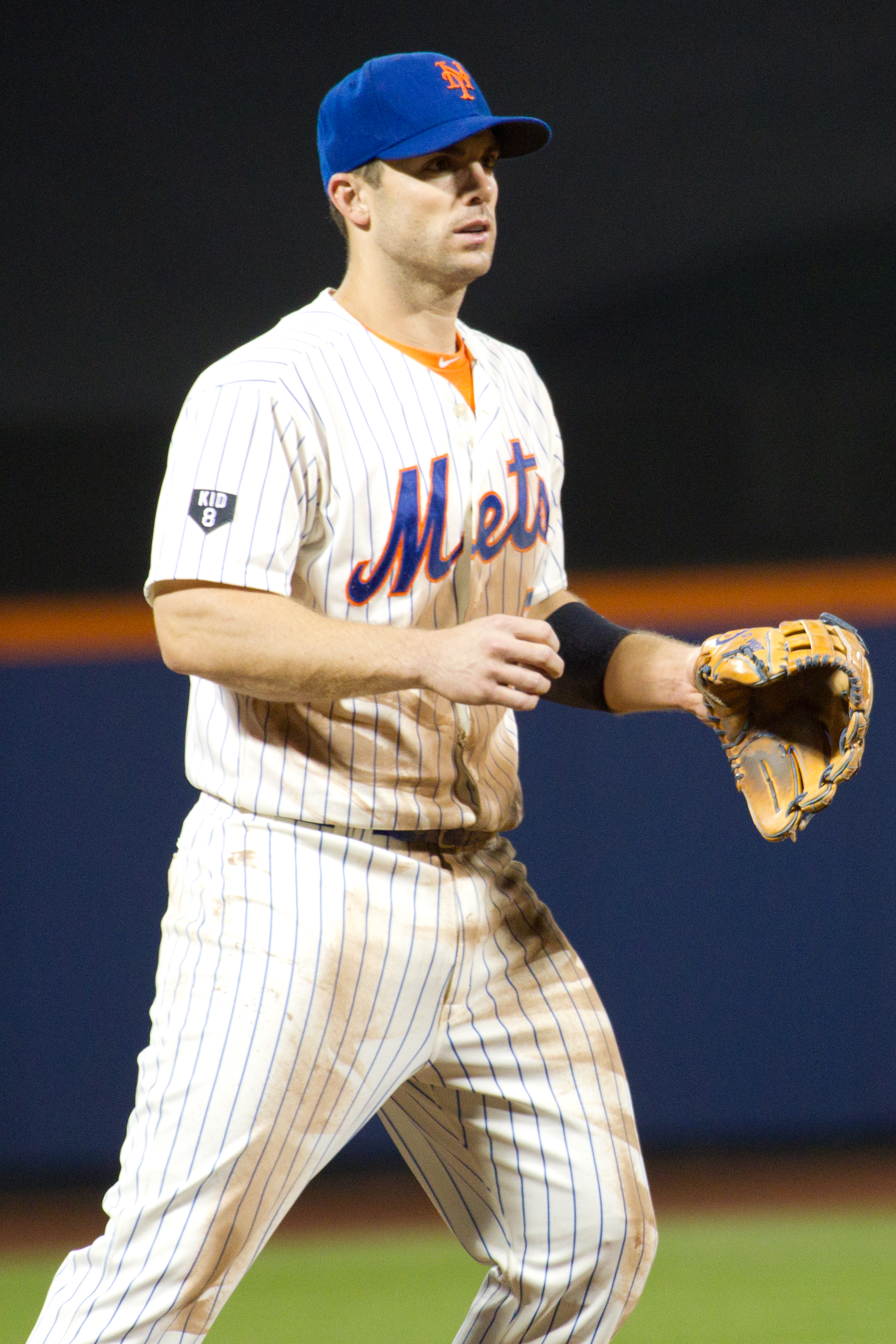
David Wright was the most recent Mets captain before retiring in 2018.

Four players have been team captains for the Mets:

- Keith Hernandez, 1987–1989 (co-captain with Gary Carter)
- Gary Carter, 1988–1989 (co-captain with Keith Hernandez)
- John Franco, 2001–2004
- David Wright, 2013–2018

=== Baseball Hall of Famers ===
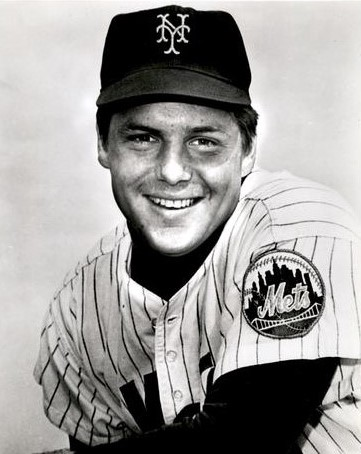
Hall of Fame P Tom Seaver (1967–1977, 1983)

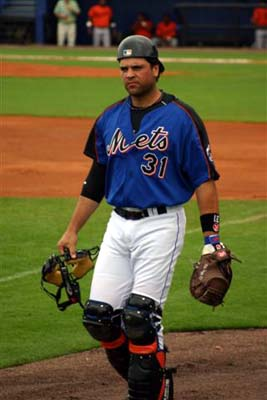
Hall of Fame C Mike Piazza (1998–2005)

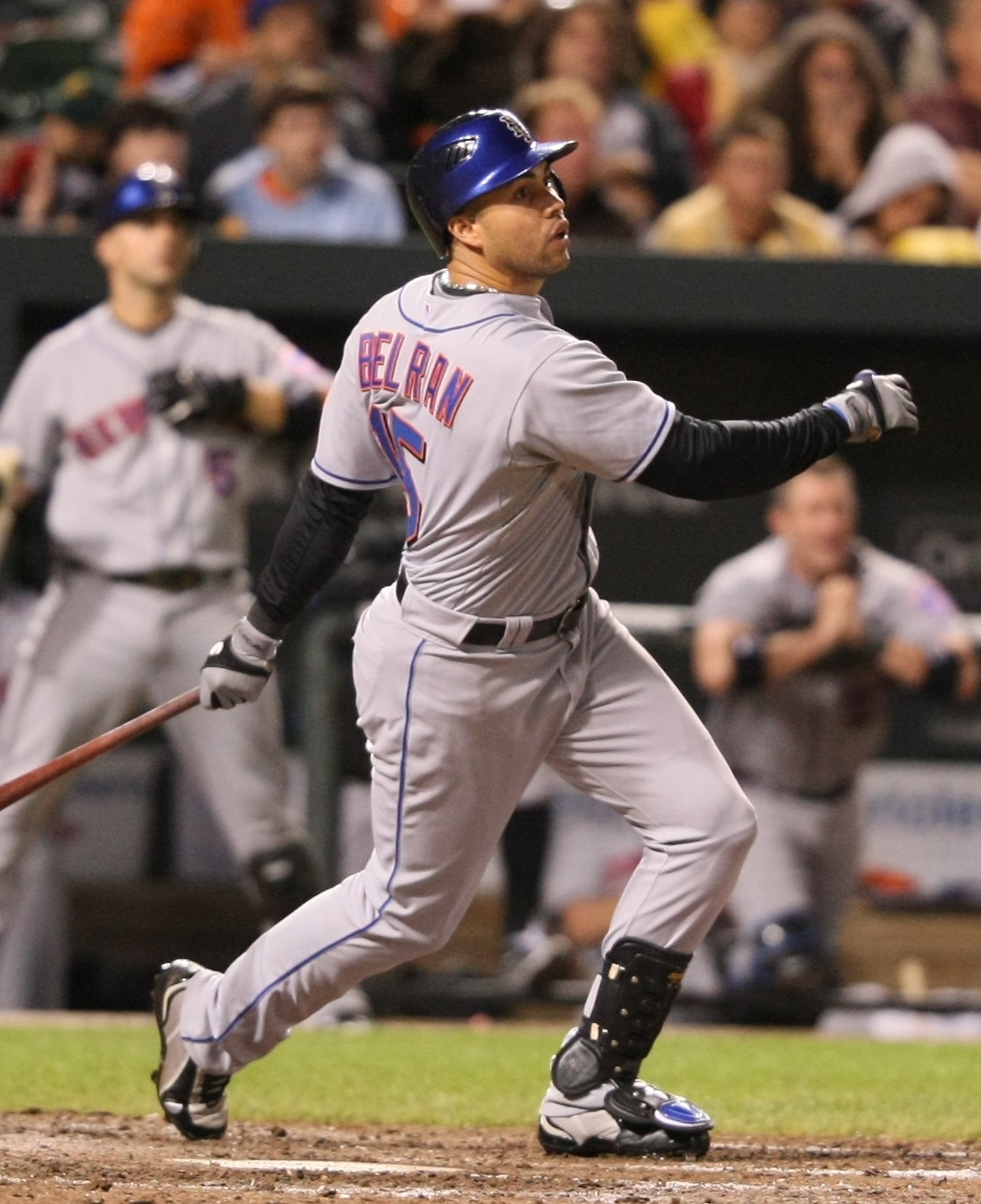
Hall of Fame CF Carlos Beltrán (2005–2011)

New York Mets Hall of Famers
Affiliation according to the National Baseball Hall of Fame and Museum
New York Mets

Roberto Alomar
Richie Ashburn
**Carlos Beltrán** *
Yogi Berra

Gary Carter
Tom Glavine
Rickey Henderson
Gil Hodges

Jeff Kent
Pedro Martínez
Willie Mays
Eddie Murray

**Mike Piazza** *
Nolan Ryan
**Tom Seaver** *
Duke Snider

Warren Spahn
Casey Stengel
Joe Torre
Billy Wagner

- Players and managers listed in **bold** are depicted on their Hall of Fame plaques wearing a Mets cap insignia.
- * New York Mets listed as primary team according to the Hall of Fame

=== Ford C. Frick Award recipients ===
New York Mets Ford C. Frick Award recipients
Affiliation according to the National Baseball Hall of Fame and Museum

**Buck Canel**

Tim McCarver

**Bob Murphy**

**Lindsey Nelson**

- **Names in bold** received the award based primarily on their work as broadcasters for the Mets.

=== New York Mets Hall of Fame ===
Key
Year	Year inducted
**Bold**	Member of the Baseball Hall of Fame
†	Member of the Baseball Hall of Fame as a Met
**Bold**	Recipient of the Hall of Fame's Ford C. Frick Award

Year	No.	Name	Position(s)	Tenure
1981	—	Joan Whitney Payson	Owner; President	1960–1975; 1968–1975
1981	37	**Casey Stengel**	Manager; VP	1962–1965; 1965–1975
1982	14	**Gil Hodges**	1B; Manager	1962–1963; 1968–1971
1982	—	**George Weiss**	President	1961–1966
1983	—	Johnny Murphy	Chief Scout; VP; VP & GM	1961–1963; 1964–1967; 1968–1970
1983	—	William Shea	Proponent	
1984	—	**Ralph Kiner**	Broadcaster	1962–2013
1984	—	**Bob Murphy**^{†}	Broadcaster	1962–2003
1984	—	**Lindsey Nelson**^{†}	Broadcaster	1962–1978
1986	3, 23, 53	Bud Harrelson	SS; Coach; Manager	1965–1977; 1982, 1985–1990; 1990–1991
1986	4, 10	Rusty Staub	RF / 1B	1972–1975, 1981–1985
1988	41	**Tom Seaver**^{†}	P Broadcaster	1967–1977, 1983; 1999–2005
1989	36, 47	Jerry Koosman	P	1967–1978
1990	7, 21	Ed Kranepool	1B	1962–1979
1991	12, 21, 34	Cleon Jones	LF	1963, 1965–1975
1992	15	Jerry Grote	C	1966–1977
1993	45	Tug McGraw	P	1965–1967, 1969–1974
1996	1, 51	Mookie Wilson	CF; Coach	1980–1989; 1997–2002, 2011
1997	17	Keith Hernandez	1B; Broadcaster	1983–1989; 2006–present
2001	8	**Gary Carter**	C	1985–1989
2002	20	Tommie Agee	CF	1968–1972
2010	—	Frank Cashen	GM & COO	1980–1991
2010	16	Dwight Gooden	P	1984–1994
2010	5	Davey Johnson	Manager	1984–1990
2010	18	Darryl Strawberry	RF	1983–1990
2012	31, 45	John Franco	P	1990–2004
2013	31	**Mike Piazza**^{†}	C	1998–2005
2020/2021	13	Edgardo Alfonzo	2B / 3B	1995–2002
2020/2021	12	Ron Darling	P Broadcaster	1983–1991; 2006–present
2020/2021	32	Jon Matlack	P	1971–1977
2023	–	Gary Cohen	Broadcaster	1989–present
2023	20, 44	Howard Johnson	3B / SS / LF / RF	1985–1993
2023	22	Al Leiter	P	1998–2004
2023	–	Howie Rose	Broadcaster	1987–present
2025	5	David Wright	3B	2004–2016, 2018
2026	15	**Carlos Beltrán**^{†}	CF	2005–2011
2026	12, 16, 13	Lee Mazzilli	CF / 1B	1976–1981, 1986–1989
2026	2	Bobby Valentine	MGR	1996–2002

=== Awards ===
==== World Series Most Valuable Player ====
- 1969 – Donn Clendenon
- 1986 – Ray Knight

==== Cy Young Award (NL) ====
- 1969 – Tom Seaver
- 1973 – Tom Seaver
- 1975 – Tom Seaver
- 1985 – Dwight Gooden
- 2012 – R. A. Dickey
- 2018 – Jacob deGrom
- 2019 – Jacob deGrom

==== Triple Crown ====
- 1985 – Dwight Gooden

==== Rookie of the Year Award (NL) ====
- 1967 – Tom Seaver
- 1972 – Jon Matlack
- 1983 – Darryl Strawberry
- 1984 – Dwight Gooden
- 2014 – Jacob deGrom
- 2019 – Pete Alonso

== Rivalries ==
The Mets have notable rivalries with the Atlanta Braves, the New York Yankees, and the Philadelphia Phillies. The Braves rivalry is due to division realignment that put both teams in the National League East in 1994. Their rivalry with the Yankees has its roots in the histories of the New York Giants, Brooklyn Dodgers, and the Yankees and the fierce Subway Series matchups between the two teams. The rivalry with the Phillies stems from the geographic New York-Philadelphia rivalry, which is also seen in other sports.

=== Subway Series ===
The Mets – New York Yankees rivalry is the latest incarnation of the Subway Series, the competition between New York City's teams, the American League New York Yankees and the National League Mets. Until Interleague play started, the two teams had only met in exhibition games. Since the inception of interleague play the two teams have met every regular season since 1997, and since 1999 they have met six times each season, playing two three-game series, one in each team's ballpark. From the 2013 season however the number of games was reduced to four, two at each ballpark with the Mets winning six of the last eight games in that span. They have made the postseason in the same year six times: 1999, 2000, 2006, 2015, 2022, and 2024, and faced off in the 2000 World Series.

=== Atlanta Braves ===
The Braves–Mets rivalry is a rivalry between two teams in the National League East, featuring the Atlanta Braves and the Mets.

Although their first major confrontation occurred when the Mets swept the Braves in the 1969 NLCS, en route to their first World Series championship, the first playoff series won by an expansion team (also the first playoff appearance by an expansion team), the rivalry did not become especially heated until the 1990s, when a division realignment in 1994 put the Mets and the Braves in the NL East together (from 1969 to 1993, the Braves were in the NL West). The two teams faced each other again in the 1999 NLCS, and the Braves won the series four games to two. However, they would go on to lose to the Yankees in the 1999 World Series.

=== Philadelphia Phillies ===
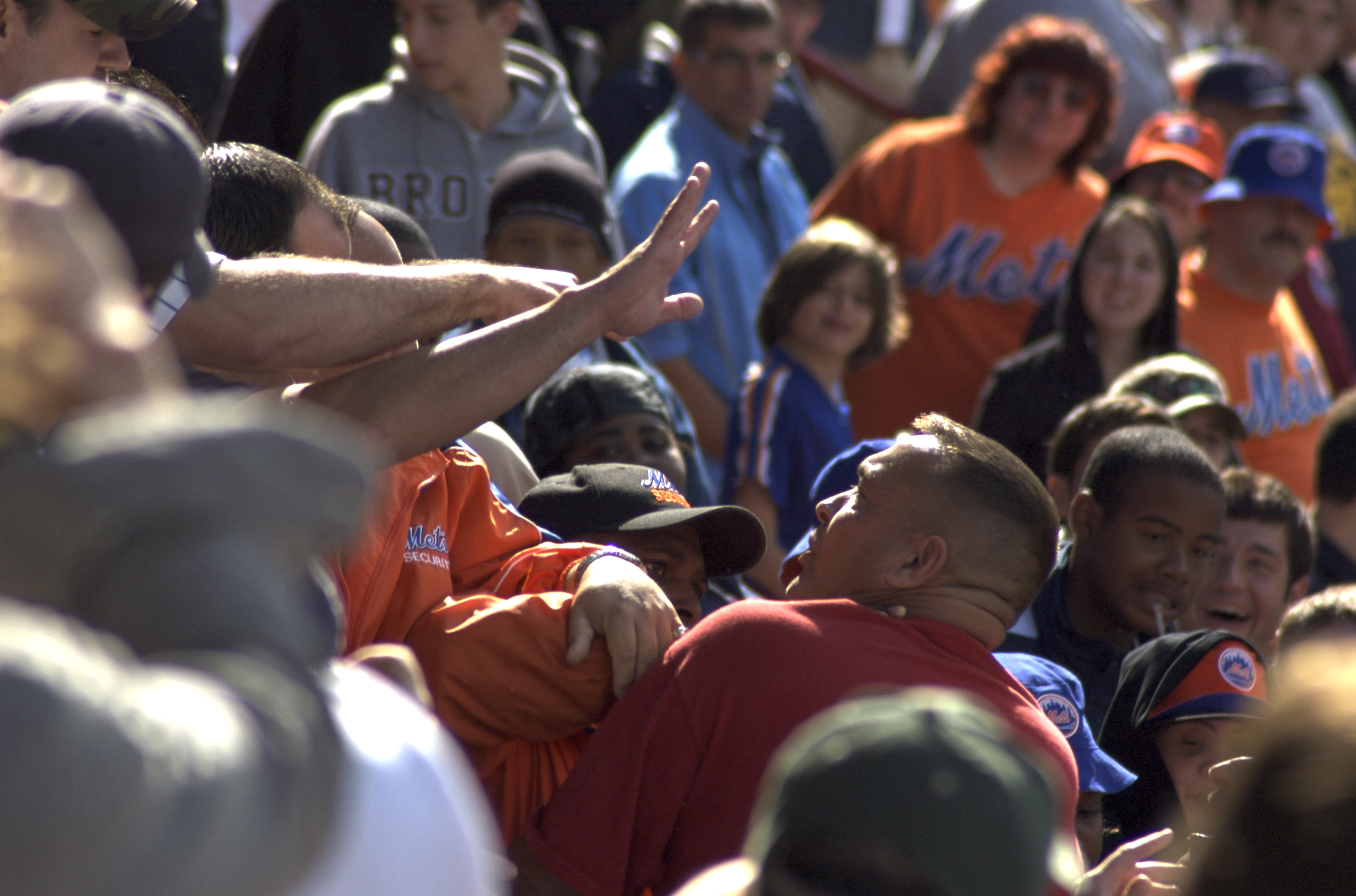
Mets fans brawl with Philadelphia Phillies fans at Shea Stadium in September 2007

During the mid to late 2000s, the rivalry between the Mets and the Philadelphia Phillies from 2006 to 2008 was said to be among the "hottest" rivalries in the National League.

Aside from several brawls in the 1980s, the rivalry remained low-key before the 2006 season, as the teams had seldom been equally good at the same time. Since 2006, the teams have battled for playoff position. The Mets won the division in 2006 and contended in 2007 and 2008, while the Phillies won five consecutive division titles from 2007 to 2011. The Phillies' 2007 Eastern Division Title was won on the last day of the season as the Mets lost a seven-game lead with 17 games remaining while losing 12 of 18 games that season to the Phillies, including being swept at home in the first 3 games of the remaining 17, dropping their lead from 7 games to 3.5. The Mets and Phillies met in the postseason for the first time during the 2024 National League Division Series, with the Mets beating the Phillies 3 games to 1.

There is a long-standing rivalry between the sports fans from New York City and Philadelphia, which are approximately two hours apart by car, which is also seen between New York Giants and the Philadelphia Eagles in the National Football League, and the New York Rangers and the Philadelphia Flyers in National Hockey League. Games between the two teams at Citi Field and Citizens Bank Park are often very intense, hard-hitting affairs, as each home crowd does its best to create an unfriendly, sometimes volatile atmosphere for any visiting-team fans.

=== St. Louis Cardinals ===
The rivalry between the St. Louis Cardinals and the Mets peaked during the 1980s when both teams contended for National League East supremacy. The rivalry began with the 1983 trade that brought Keith Hernandez from the Cardinals to the Mets, essentially turning the latter into contenders. Between 1985 and 1988, the division was dominated by either of the two teams, and in three of those years, the NL East winner went on to the World Series. In 1994, the Cardinals were moved to the National League Central, and the rivalry faded soon after. The two teams would meet in the 2000 and 2006 National League Championship Series, briefly rekindling the rivalry.

=== Washington Nationals ===
The rivalry between the Washington Nationals and the Mets started forming after the Nationals relocated to Washington D.C. in 2005, but it really developed in the 2010s when both teams were fighting for the NL East every year. In 2016, tight NL East races, series sweeps, and dominant performances from a number of certain players that could be in the hall of fame when their careers are over. By 2022, the games became more heated and emotional. Hit-by-pitches and bench clearing moments made the teams very chippy at each other. Overall, it's a rivalry built on frequent high-stakes games rather than historical hatred of the franchise like other teams.

== Personnel ==
New York Mets 2027 spring training roster
40-man roster		Non-roster invitees	Coaches / other
Pitchers: —- Jack Anderson; 54 Daniel Duarte; 75 Reed Garrett; 47 Justin Hagenman; 94 Nate Lavender; 59 Sean Manaea; 43 Chayce McDermott; 26 Nolan McLean; 58 Tylor Megill; 32 Tobias Myers; 72 Dedniel Núñez; —- Pierson Ohl; 52 Cionel Pérez; 91 Jonathan Pintaro; 45 Christian Scott; 34 Kodai Senga; 89 Robert Stock; 49 Zac Thornton; 21 Jonah Tong; 44 Austin Warren; 82 Jack Weisenburger; 38 Devin Williams; 84 Jefry Yan	Catchers: 4 Francisco Álvarez; 6 Hayden Senger; 13 Luis Torrens; Infielders: 7 Brett Baty; 19 Bo Bichette; 12 Francisco Lindor; 0 Ronny Mauricio; 28 Christopher Morel; 11 Jorge Polanco; -- Jefferson Rojas; 10 Marcus Semien; 27 Mark Vientos; 29 Jared Young; Outfielders: 3 Carson Benge; 9 A. J. Ewing; 55 Nick Morabito; 22 Juan Soto	Pitchers: -- Joel Kuhnel	Manager: 70 Andy Green; Coaches: 68 J. P. Arencibia (catching); 50 Kai Correa (bench); 80 Rafael Fernandez (assistant hitting); 65 Gilbert Gomez (first base and outfield); 78 Eric Langill (bullpen catcher); 63 Tim Leiper (third base and infield); 76 Dan McKinney (assistant pitching); 77 Dave Racaniello (bullpen catcher); 67 José Rosado (bullpen); 60 Troy Snitker (hitting); 62 Justin Willard (pitching); 40 active, 0 inactive, 1 non-roster invitees; 7-, 10-, or 15-day injured list; * Not on active roster; ^{†} Suspended list; Roster, coaches, and NRIs updated November 19, 2026; Transactions • Depth chart; → All MLB rosters

== New York Mets Foundation ==
A registered 501(c)(3) charity, the New York Mets Foundation is the philanthropic organization of the New York Mets. Founded in 1963, it funds and promotes charitable causes in the Mets community. One of these causes is Tuesday's Children, is a non-profit family service organization that "has made a long term commitment to meet the needs of every family who lost a loved one in the terrorist attacks on September 11, 2001". The Mets host the annual Welcome Home Dinner, which raised over $550,000 for the Mets Foundation in 2012. All proceeds were distributed to Katz Institute for Women's Health and Katz Women's Hospitals of North Shore-LIJ Health System and The Leukemia & Lymphoma Society.

== Management ==
- Owner/Chairman/chief executive officer: Steve Cohen
- Owner/President: Alexandra M. Cohen
- Vice chairman: Andrew B. Cohen
- President of Baseball Operations: David Stearns
- General Manager: vacant
  - Assistant General Manager: Eduardo Brizuela
  - Assistant General Manager: Jonathan Strangio
  - Assistant General Manager: Ben Zauzmer
- Vice President, Player Development: Andy Green
- Special Assistant to the President of Baseball Operations: Carlos Beltrán

== Radio and television ==
=== Television ===
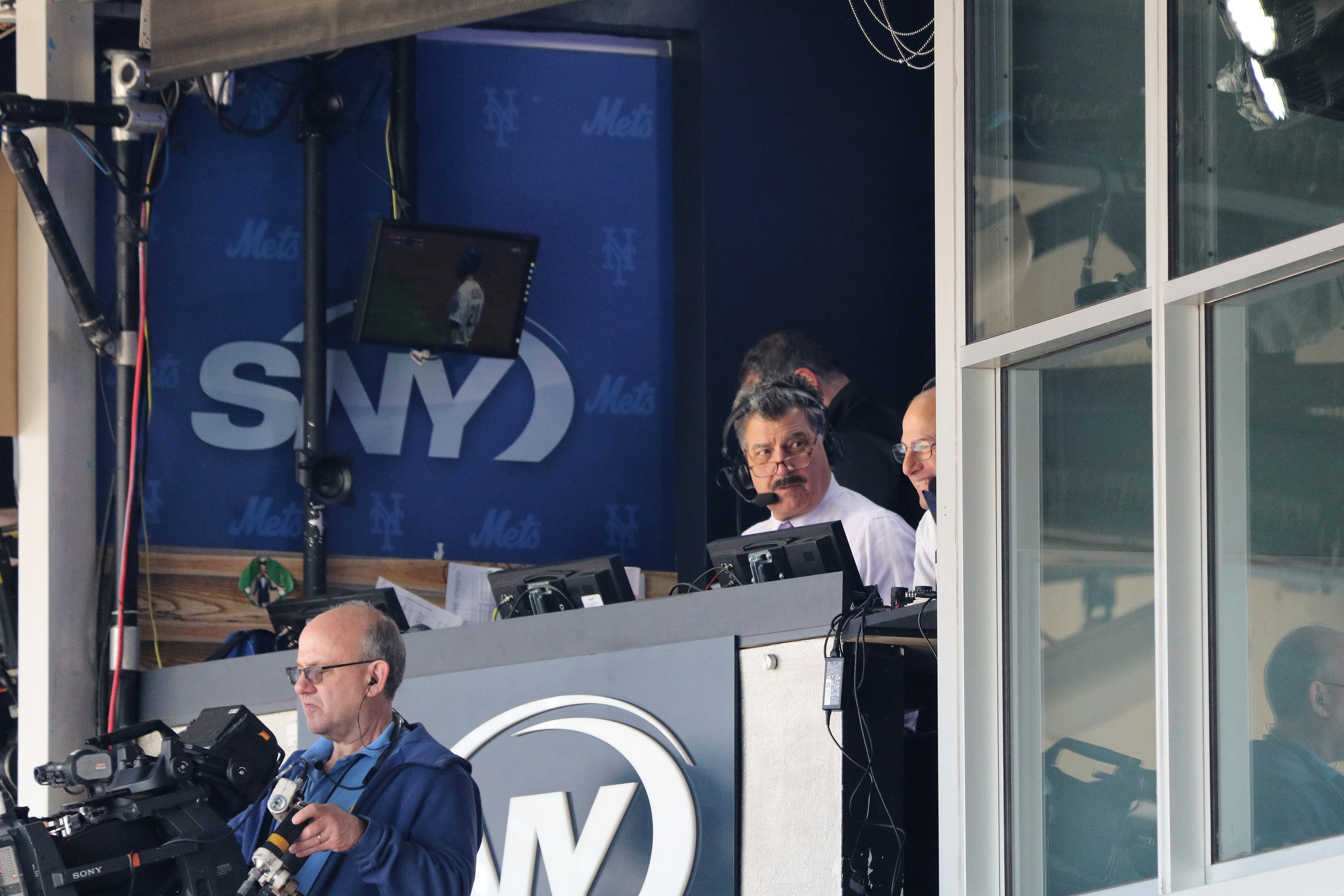
Announcers Keith Hernandez and Gary Cohen in the SNY broadcast booth at Citi Field in 2019.

The majority of Mets games are carried by SportsNet New York (SNY), a joint venture of the Mets and NBC Sports Regional Networks launched in 2006. The primary play-by-play announcer is Gary Cohen, with former Mets Keith Hernandez and Ron Darling working as the primary color commentators. Steve Gelbs serves as the field reporter for most games and as an alternate play-by-play announcer behind Cohen. Todd Zeile, Jerry Blevins, and Daniel Murphy also appear as color commentators on select games.

Cohen had called Mets' games on the radio since 1989, moving to television upon the establishment of SNY in 2006. Hernandez had previously worked as a color commentator on the Mets' television broadcasts since 1998, and Darling as a broadcaster and color commentator for the Oakland Athletics and the Washington Nationals. From 2007 to 2015, Kevin Burkhardt served as a field reporter and fill-in play-by-play announcer on SNY broadcasts before moving to Fox Sports full time.

For the twenty years following the team's inception in 1962, Mets' games were simulcasted on radio and television. Until 1978, almost all Mets games were called by the trio of Lindsey Nelson, Bob Murphy, and Ralph Kiner on both radio and television. Nelson left the broadcast after the 1978 season and was replaced by Steve Albert, with Murphy assuming the primary play-by-play duties.

In 1982, when the team separated its radio and television broadcasts, Kiner became the lead television play-by play voice of the Mets, with Tim McCarver, Fran Healy, and Rusty Staub among those working as color commentators. Gary Thorne, who had previously been a radio announcer for the Mets, joined the television broadcast in 1994 as a secondary play-by-play announcer.

In 1996, Thorne and Howie Rose began splitting the primary play-by-play duties, with Kiner scaling back his workload to a color commentary role. Over the next few years, former Mets Tom Seaver and Keith Hernandez would also begin working as color commentators. Thorne left the broadcast in 2003, at which point Ted Robinson, Matt Loughlin, and Dave O'Brien began alternating play-by-play duties with Rose until he departed for the Mets' radio booth the following year in 2004.

The team has broadcast games over-the-air on WPIX since 1999, and still airs approximately thirty SNY-produced telecasts on the station per season. Games on WPIX are syndicated across New York and Connecticut to WCCT-TV (Hartford, CT), WCWN/WRGB (Albany, NY), WYCI (Saranac Lake, NY), WSYT-MY43 (Syracuse, NY), WPNY-LD (Utica, NY), WICZ-DT2 (Binghamton, NY), WQMY (Williamsport, PA), WOLF-DT3 (Scranton, PA) and WHAM-DT2 (Rochester, NY).

=== Radio ===
Howie Rose has been the Mets' primary radio play-by-play announcer since 2004, and has been partnered with former Brooklyn Cyclones play-by-play announcer Keith Raad since 2023. Pat McCarthy, the son of former Mets radio voice and current Philadelphia Phillies television broadcaster Tom McCarthy, has served as the host of the radio pre- and post-game shows since 2023, in addition to providing play-by-play for select games.

As of late August 2024, Mets radio broadcasts are produced by Audacy, Inc. on the Mets Radio Network, airing locally on WHSQ 880 AM and nationally on the Audacy Mets Radio streaming service. Mets games have aired over the 880 AM frequency since 2019, when the station was still known as WCBS-AM. Spanish-language broadcasts are aired on WINS-FM-HD2 featuring Max Perez-Jimenez and Nestor Rosario, along with MLB.tv and SNY's second audio program channels. They had previously been on WEPN 1050. It was formerly broadcast on WQBU-FM 92.7, Que Buena from 2020 to 2021. Both English and Spanish broadcasts are also aired on the Audacy internet radio service.

The Mets' previous radio flagship was WOR from 2014 to 2018. The Mets were previously carried by WFAN, which inherited the team's broadcast rights from WHN when it took over its frequency in 1987, and in later years by WFAN-FM which simulcast the AM signal. In 2019, coinciding with their move to WCBS, the Mets abruptly stopped syndicating its games to other stations outside the New York City area, effectively shutting down the New York Mets Radio Network.

After having broadcast Mets' games for twenty years, most notably alongside Lindsey Nelson and Ralph Kiner, Bob Murphy became the Mets' lead play-by-play announcer in 1982, when the team stopped simulcasting its games. He was partnered with Steve LaMar until the 1984 season, and with Gary Thorne beginning with the 1985 season.

Upon Thorne's move to ABC's Thursday Night Baseball in 1989, Gary Cohen became Murphy's broadcast partner, and the pair continued to call games until Murphy's retirement in 2003. In 2004, after having served as the primary television play-by-play announcer since 1996, Howie Rose joined the radio broadcast as Murphy's successor.

In 2006, Cohen left the radio booth to become the primary play-by-play announcer of the Mets on the newly launched SportsNet New York (SNY) television network. He was replaced by Tom McCarthy, who departed after just two seasons with the broadcast in 2008, with Wayne Hagin taking his place. In 2011, Josh Lewin joined the broadcast after the team parted ways with Hagin following the previous season. Wayne Randazzo began hosting the pre- and post-game shows in 2015, and later became Rose's play-by-play partner upon Lewin's departure in 2019, when the broadcast moved to WCBS. That same year, longtime Mets beat reporter Ed Coleman took over hosting duties for the pre- and post-game shows, a position he previously held from 1996 to 2013. Randazzo left the Mets in 2022 to become the primary television play-by-play voice of the Los Angeles Angels and of Friday Night Baseball on Apple TV+.

== Minor league affiliations ==
The New York Mets farm system consists of seven minor league affiliates.

Class	Team	League	Location	Ballpark	Affiliated
Triple-A	Syracuse Mets	International League	Syracuse, New York	NBT Bank Stadium	2019
Double-A	Binghamton Rumble Ponies	Eastern League	Binghamton, New York	Mirabito Stadium	1991
High-A	Brooklyn Cyclones	South Atlantic League	Brooklyn, New York	Maimonides Park	2001
Single-A	St. Lucie Mets	Florida State League	Port St. Lucie, Florida	Clover Park	1988
Rookie	FCL Mets	Florida Complex League	Port St. Lucie, Florida	Clover Park	2013
Rookie	DSL Mets Blue	Dominican Summer League	Boca Chica, Santo Domingo	New York Mets Complex	2010
Rookie	DSL Mets Orange	Dominican Summer League	Boca Chica, Santo Domingo	New York Mets Complex	2010

== See also ==
- List of New York Mets managers
- List of New York Mets owners and executives
- List of New York Mets seasons
- List of World Series champions
- New York Mets award winners and league leaders

== Bibliography ==
- Gordon, Devin (2021). So Many Ways to Lose: The Amazin' True Story of the New York Mets―the Best Worst Team in Sports. New York: Harper. ISBN 978-0062940025.
- Harper, John (2005). The Worst Team Money Could Buy. New York: Bison. ISBN 978-0803278226.
- Madden, Bill (2020). Tom Seaver: A Terrific Life. New York: Simon & Schuster. ISBN 978-1982136185.
- Pearlman, Jeff (2011). The Bad Guys Won: A Season of Brawling, Boozing, Bimbo Chasing, and Championship Baseball with Straw, Doc, Mookie, Nails, the Kid, and the Rest of the ... Put on a New York Uniform--and Maybe the Best. New York: Harper Perennial. ISBN 978-0062097637.
- Prato, Greg (2015). The Seventh Year Stretch: New York Mets, 1977-1983. New York: Greg Prato Writer, Corp. ISBN 978-1516895281.

Awards and achievements
Preceded by Detroit Tigers; 1968	World Series champions 1969	Succeeded by Baltimore Orioles; 1970
Preceded by Kansas City Royals; 1985	World Series champions 1986	Succeeded by Minnesota Twins; 1987
Preceded by St. Louis Cardinals; 1967–1968	National League champions 1969	Succeeded by Cincinnati Reds; 1970
Preceded by Cincinnati Reds; 1972	National League champions 1973	Succeeded by Los Angeles Dodgers; 1974
Preceded by St. Louis Cardinals; 1985	National League champions 1986	Succeeded by St. Louis Cardinals; 1987
Preceded by Atlanta Braves; 1999	National League champions 2000	Succeeded by Arizona Diamondbacks; 2001
Preceded by San Francisco Giants; 2014	National League champions 2015	Succeeded by Chicago Cubs; 2016
