= 2026 Miami Marlins season =

2026 Miami Marlins
- League: National League
- Division: East
- Ballpark: LoanDepot Park
- City: Miami, Florida
- Record: 80–82 (.494)
- Divisional place: 3rd
- Owner: Bruce Sherman
- President of baseball operations: Peter Bendix
- General manager: Gabe Kapler
- Manager: Clayton McCullough
- Television: MLB Local Media
- Radio: WINZ; Miami Marlins Radio Network (English)

The 2026 Miami Marlins season was the 34th season for the Major League Baseball (MLB) franchise in the National League (NL). The Marlins play their home games at LoanDepot Park as members of the NL East division.

The Marlins opened their season with a sweep for the first time since 2009. The Marlins achieved a 52-42 record by the All-Star break, in playoff position and just three games behind the Braves for the division lead. However, Miami suffered a 12-game losing streak, the longest in franchise history, and collapsed late in the season. A loss on September 18 officially eliminated Miami from playoff contention.

== Regular season ==
=== Standings ===
==== National League East ====
NL East
Team	W	L	Pct.	GB	Home	Road
Atlanta Braves	94	68	.580	—	52‍–‍29	42‍–‍39
Philadelphia Phillies	88	74	.543	6	43‍–‍38	45‍–‍36
Miami Marlins	80	82	.494	14	47‍–‍34	33‍–‍48
Washington Nationals	77	85	.475	17	39‍–‍42	38‍–‍43
New York Mets	74	88	.457	20	36‍–‍45	38‍–‍43

==== National League Wild Card ====
Division leaders
Team	W	L	Pct.
Milwaukee Brewers	103	59	.636
Los Angeles Dodgers	100	62	.617
Atlanta Braves	94	68	.580

Wild Card teams (Top 3 teams qualify for postseason)
Team	W	L	Pct.	GB
San Diego Padres	91	71	.562	+3
Chicago Cubs	89	73	.549	+1
Philadelphia Phillies	88	74	.543	—
Arizona Diamondbacks	86	76	.531	2
Pittsburgh Pirates	82	80	.506	6
Miami Marlins	80	82	.494	8
St. Louis Cardinals	77	85	.475	11
Washington Nationals	77	85	.475	11
Cincinnati Reds	75	87	.463	13
New York Mets	74	88	.457	14
San Francisco Giants	65	97	.401	23
Colorado Rockies	58	104	.358	30

==== Record vs. opponents ====
2026 National League record Source: MLB Standings Grid – 2026
Team	AZ	ATL	CHC	CIN	COL	LAD	MIA	MIL	NYM	PHI	PIT	SD	SF	STL	WSH	AL
Arizona	—	4–3	2–4	4–2	9–4	7–6	1–5	2–4	4–2	3–3	3–3	6–7	10–3	5–2	2–4	24–24
Atlanta	3–4	—	3–3	3–3	6–0	5–1	9–4	3–3	6–7	9–4	5–1	3–4	1–5	2–4	9–4	27–21
Chicago	4–2	3–3	—	9–4	3–3	4–2	3–3	4–9	7–0	6–1	7–6	5–1	3–3	6–7	3–3	22–26
Cincinnati	2–4	3–3	4–9	—	4–2	1–6	3–4	4–9	4–2	3–3	6–7	3–3	3–3	5–8	1–5	29–19
Colorado	4–9	0–6	3–3	2–4	—	3–10	2–5	1–5	4–2	2–4	3–3	2–11	7–6	2–4	3–4	20–28
Los Angeles	6–7	1–5	2–4	6–1	10–3	—	2–4	3–4	5–1	4–2	5–1	8–5	9–4	2–4	6–0	31–17
Miami	5–1	4–9	3–3	4–3	5–2	4–2	—	1–5	6–7	5–8	4–2	0–6	4–2	4–2	9–4	22–26
Milwaukee	4–2	3–3	9–4	9–4	5–1	4–3	5–1	—	4–2	4–2	6–7	2–4	3–4	11–2	2–4	32–16
New York	2–4	7–6	0–7	2–4	2–4	1–5	7–6	2–4	—	6–7	4–2	4–2	5–2	2–4	7–6	23–25
Philadelphia	3–3	4–9	1–6	3–3	4–2	2–4	8–5	2–4	7–6	—	5–2	6–0	4–2	4–2	9–4	26–22
Pittsburgh	3–3	1–5	6–7	7–6	3–3	1–5	2–4	7–6	2–4	2–5	—	3–3	3–3	6–7	4–3	32–16
San Diego	7–6	4–3	1–5	3–3	11–2	5–8	6–0	4–2	2–4	0–6	3–3	—	9–4	3–4	4–2	29–19
San Francisco	3–10	5–1	3–3	3–3	6–7	4–9	2–4	4–3	2–5	2–4	3–3	4–9	—	5–1	3–3	16–32
St. Louis	2–5	4–2	7–6	8–5	4–2	4–2	2–4	2–11	4–2	2–4	7–6	4–3	1–5	—	3–3	23–25
Washington	4–2	4–9	3–3	5–1	4–3	0–6	4–9	4–2	6–7	4–9	3–4	2–4	3–3	3–3	—	28–20

Updated with the results of all games through September 27, 2026.

=== Game log ===
Legend
	Marlins win
	Marlins loss
	Postponement
	Eliminated from playoff race
**Bold**	Marlins team member

2026 Game Log: 79–82 (Home: 46–34; Road: 33–48)
March/April: 15–16 (Home: 10–6; Road: 5–10)

#	Date	Opponent	Score	Win	Loss	Save	Attendance	Record	Box/Streak
1	March 27	Rockies	2–1	**Alcántara** (1–0)	Freeland (0–1)	**Fairbanks** (1)	32,459	1–0	W1
2	March 28	Rockies	4–3	**Faucher** (1–0)	Hill (0–1)	**Fairbanks** (2)	10,160	2–0	W2
3	March 29	Rockies	4–3	**Petersen** (1–0)	Vodnik (0–1)	—	17,355	3–0	W3
4	March 30	White Sox	4–9	Martin (1–0)	**Paddack** (0–1)	—	6,515	3–1	L1
5	March 31	White Sox	9–2	**Bender** (1–0)	Fedde (0–1)	—	6,667	4–1	W1
6	April 1	White Sox	10–0	**Alcántara** (2–0)	Smith (0–2)	—	6,505	5–1	W2
7	April 3	@ Yankees	2–8	Warren (1–0)	**Pérez** (0–1)	—	48,788	5–2	L1
8	April 4	@ Yankees	7–9	Headrick (1–0)	**Petersen** (1–1)	Bednar (4)	44,150	5–3	L2
9	April 5	@ Yankees	7–6	**King** (1–0)	Bird (1–1)	**Bender** (1)	34,807	6–3	W1
10	April 6	Reds	0–2	Williamson (1–1)	**Junk** (0–1)	Pagán (4)	10,934	6–4	L1
11	April 7	Reds	3–6 (10)	Pagán (1–0)	**Faucher** (1–1)	—	8,318	6–5	L2
12	April 8	Reds	7–4	**Pérez** (1–1)	Singer (0–1)	**Petersen** (1)	8,639	7–5	W1
13	April 9	Reds	8–1	**Meyer** (1–0)	Lowder (1–1)	**Phillips** (1)	9,578	8–5	W2
14	April 10	@ Tigers	0–2	Montero (1–1)	**Paddack** (0–2)	Jansen (2)	20,285	8–6	L1
15	April 11	@ Tigers	1–6	Mize (1–1)	**Junk** (0–2)	Anderson (1)	31,414	8–7	L2
16	April 12	@ Tigers	2–8	Skubal (2–2)	**Alcántara** (2–1)	—	26,768	8–8	L3
17	April 13	@ Braves	10–4	**Nardi** (1–0)	Bummer (0–1)	—	22,912	9–8	W1
18	April 14	@ Braves	5–6	Suárez (2–0)	**Fairbanks** (0–1)	Iglesias (3)	27,441	9–9	L1
19	April 15	@ Braves	3–6	Elder (2–1)	**Paddack** (0–3)	Iglesias (4)	28,884	9–10	L2
20	April 17	Brewers	5–7 (10)	Uribe (1–0)	**Faucher** (1–2)	Megill (4)	11,103	9–11	L3
21	April 18	Brewers	2–5	Woodruff (2–0)	**Alcántara** (2–2)	Uribe (2)	15,446	9–12	L4
22	April 19	Brewers	5–3	**Pérez** (2–1)	Misiorowski (1–2)	**Fairbanks** (3)	24,553	10–12	W1
23	April 20	Cardinals	5–3	**Faucher** (2–2)	McGreevy (1–2)	**Fairbanks** (4)	8,285	11–12	W2
24	April 21	Cardinals	3–5	May (3–2)	**Paddack** (0–4)	O'Brien (7)	8,412	11–13	L1
25	April 22	Cardinals	4–1	**Junk** (1–2)	Leahy (2–3)	**Fairbanks** (5)	7,593	12–13	W1
26	April 24	@ Giants	9–4	**Alcántara** (3–2)	Houser (0–3)	—	38,317	13–13	W2
27	April 25	@ Giants	2–6	Gage (2–0)	**Pérez** (2–2)	—	38,589	13–14	L1
28	April 26	@ Giants	3–6	Roupp (5–1)	**Nardi** (1–1)	Miller (2)	40,445	13–15	L2
29	April 27	@ Dodgers	4–5	Eder (1–0)	**Fairbanks** (0–2)	—	49,918	13–16	L3
30	April 28	@ Dodgers	2–1	**Junk** (2–2)	Ohtani (2–1)	**Phillips** (2)	51,909	14–16	W1
31	April 29	@ Dodgers	3–2	**Nardi** (2–1)	Klein (1–2)	**Faucher** (1)	50,555	15–16	W2

May: 11–18 (Home: 8–9; Road: 3–9)

#	Date	Opponent	Score	Win	Loss	Save	Attendance	Record	Box/Streak
32	May 1	Phillies	5–6	Wheeler (1–0)	**Pérez** (2–3)	Keller (1)	15,713	15–17	L1
33	May 2	Phillies	4–0	**Meyer** (2–0)	Painter (1–3)	—	15,126	16–17	W1
34	May 3	Phillies	2–7	Luzardo (3–3)	**Paddack** (0–5)	—	21,662	16–18	L1
35	May 4	Phillies	0–1	Nola (2–3)	**Junk** (2–3)	Keller (2)	7,626	16–19	L2
36	May 5	Orioles	7–9	Garcia (3–0)	**Nardi** (2–2)	—	6,600	16–20	L3
37	May 6	Orioles	4–7	Young (3–1)	**Pérez** (2–4)	Garcia (2)	6,607	16–21	L4
38	May 7	Orioles	4–3	**Faucher** (3–2)	Kittredge (0–1)	—	8,588	17–21	W1
39	May 8	Nationals	2–3	Griffin (4–1)	**Snelling** (0–1)	Poulin (1)	12,070	17–22	L1
40	May 9	Nationals	8–7	**Nardi** (3–2)	Parker (2–1)	**King** (1)	20,185	18–22	W1
41	May 10	Nationals	5–2	**Faucher** (4–2)	Varland (0–1)	**Ekness** (1)	11,848	19–22	W2
42	May 12	@ Twins	0–3	Ober (4–2)	**Pérez** (2–5)	—	13,471	19–23	L1
43	May 13	@ Twins	9–5	**Meyer** (3–0)	Woods Richardson (0–6)	—	14,005	20–23	W1
44	May 14	@ Twins	1–9	Matthews (1–0)	**Garrett** (0–1)	—	20,702	20–24	L1
45	May 15	@ Rays	2–7	Scholtens (4–2)	**Junk** (2–4)	—	14,919	20–25	L2
46	May 16	@ Rays	10–5 (10)	**Fairbanks** (1–2)	Bigge (1–1)	—	19,673	21–25	W1
47	May 17	@ Rays	3–6	Rasmussen (4–1)	**Pérez** (2–6)	Baker (12)	16,788	21–26	L1
48	May 18	Braves	12–0	**Meyer** (4–0)	Ritchie (1–1)	—	8,672	22–26	W1
49	May 19	Braves	4–8	Lee (2–0)	**Faucher** (4–3)	—	7,521	22–27	L1
50	May 20	Braves	1–9	Sale (7–3)	**Junk** (2–5)	—	9,617	22–28	L2
51	May 21	Braves	3–9	Strider (2–0)	**Alcántara** (3–3)	—	8,834	22–29	L3
52	May 22	Mets	2–1	**Pérez** (3–6)	Manaea (0–1)	**Fairbanks** (6)	17,095	23–29	W1
53	May 23	Mets	4–1	**Meyer** (5–0)	Peralta (3–4)	―	21,071	24–29	W2
54	May 24	Mets	4–0	**Fairbanks** (2–2)	Williams (3–2)	—	23,018	25–29	W3
55	May 25	@ Blue Jays	8–2	**Junk** (3–5)	Yesavage (2–2)	—	41,177	26–29	W4
56	May 26	@ Blue Jays	1–8	Miles (2–0)	**Alcántara** (3–4)	—	42,815	26–30	L1
57	May 27	@ Blue Jays	1–2	Hoffman (3–3)	**Nardi** (3–3)	Rogers (2)	42,372	26–31	L2
58	May 29	@ Mets	7–9 (10)	Warren (1–1)	**Fairbanks** (2–3)	—	39,386	26–32	L3
59	May 30	@ Mets	1–6	Scott (1–0)	**Phillips** (0–1)	—	38,552	26–33	L4
60	May 31	@ Mets	1–10	McLean (3–4)	**King** (1–1)	Peterson (1)	40,634	26–34	L5

June: 20–6 (Home: 10–2; Road: 10–4)

#	Date	Opponent	Score	Win	Loss	Save	Attendance	Record	Box/Streak
61	June 1	@ Nationals	7–3	**Alcántara** (4–4)	Lovelady (2–3)	—	11,808	27–34	W1
62	June 2	@ Nationals	7–3	**King** (2–1)	Mikolas (1–5)	—	19,751	28–34	W2
63	June 3	@ Nationals	4–1	**Meyer** (6–0)	Beeter (1–1)	**Fairbanks** (7)	16,695	29–34	W3
64	June 5	Rays	0–6	Rasmussen (5–2)	**Gusto** (0–1)	—	10,312	29–35	L1
65	June 6	Rays	4–3	**King** (3–1)	McClanahan (6–3)	**Zuber** (1)	12,443	30–35	W1
66	June 7	Rays	4–1	**Alcántara** (5–4)	Cleavinger (1–2)	**Bender** (2)	14,525	31–35	W2
67	June 9	Diamondbacks	10–6	**Fairbanks** (3–3)	Garcia (0–1)	—	8,732	32–35	W3
68	June 10	Diamondbacks	8–0	**Kempner** (1–0)	Nelson (2–5)	–	7,729	33–35	W4
69	June 11	Diamondbacks	2–0	**Phillips** (1–1)	Kelly (5–5)	**Fairbanks** (8)	8,580	34–35	W5
70	June 12	@ Pirates	8–3	**Alcántara** (6–4)	Dotel (1–2)	—	19,587	35–35	W6
71	June 13	@ Pirates	2–3	Ramírez (4–2)	**Bender** (1–1)	Soto (10)	31,192	35–36	L1
72	June 14	@ Pirates	4–2	**Meyer** (7–0)	Skenes (6–6)	**Fairbanks** (9)	18,127	36–36	W1
73	June 15	@ Phillies	0–7	Wheeler (6–1)	**Gusto** (0–2)	—	39,241	36–37	L1
74	June 16	@ Phillies	2–8	Luzardo (6–4)	**Phillips** (1–2)	—	38,238	36–38	L2
75	June 17	@ Phillies	12–4	**Alcántara** (7–4)	Painter (1–8)	—	37,591	37–38	W1
76	June 19	Giants	4–3	**Gibson** (1–0)	Hentges (1–2)	**Fairbanks** (10)	11,677	38–38	W2
77	June 20	Giants	6–3	**Meyer** (8–0)	McDonald (2–5)	**Fairbanks** (11)	22,643	39–38	W3
78	June 21	Giants	2–1	**King** (4–1)	Webb (4–5)	**Bachar** (1)	18,749	40–38	W4
79	June 22	Rangers	3–4	Ahlstrom (2–0)	**Faucher** (4–4)	Latz (14)	20,008	40–39	L1
80	June 23	Rangers	6–4	**Alcántara** (8–4)	Corniell (0–1)	—	9,971	41–39	W1
81	June 24	Rangers	4–2	**King** (5–1)	deGrom (6–5)	**Fairbanks** (12)	13,710	42–39	W2
82	June 26	@ Cardinals	4–0	**Meyer** (9–0)	Soriano (3–2)	—	27,584	43–39	W3
83	June 27	@ Cardinals	5–1	**King** (6–1)	Pallante (9–5)	—	25,876	44–39	W4
84	June 28	@ Cardinals	1–2	Leahy (6–4)	**Phillips** (1–3)	O'Brien (20)	37,779	44–40	L1
85	June 29	@ Rockies	10–7	**Alcántara** (9–4)	Vodnik (2–3)	—	22,910	45–40	W1
86	June 30	@ Rockies	14–3	**Pérez** (4–6)	Gordon (0–2)	—	20,526	46–40	W2

July: 10–15 (Home: 6–6; Road: 4–9)

#	Date	Opponent	Score	Win	Loss	Save	Attendance	Record	Box/Streak
87	July 1	@ Rockies	3–6	Freeland (2–7)	**Meyer** (9–1)	Bernardino (1)	18,978	46–41	L1
88	July 2	@ Rockies	4–14	Bernardino (3–3)	**King** (6–2)	—	19,595	46–42	L2
89	July 3	@ Athletics	12–5	**Bachar** (1–0)	Perkins (2–4)	—	10,312	47–42	W1
90	July 4	@ Athletics	7–2	**Alcántara** (10–4)	Civale (5–6)	—	12,532	48–42	W2
91	July 5	@ Athletics	9–8	**Pérez** (5–6)	Jump (3–3)	—	8,686	49–42	W3
92	July 7	Mariners	6–5 (10)	**Gibson** (2–0)	Rucker (0–2)	—	8,660	50–42	W4
93	July 8	Mariners	2–0	**Philips** (2–3)	Kirby (7–8)	**Fairbanks** (13)	10,545	51–42	W5
94	July 9	Mariners	8–4	**Junk** (4–5)	Miller (4–3)	—	7,815	52–42	W6
95	July 10	Guardians	2–3	Messick (8–5)	**Alcántara** (10–5)	Smith (28)	15,605	52–43	L1
96	July 11	Guardians	1–4	Bibee (3–9)	**Pérez** (5–7)	Holderman (1)	16,070	52–44	L2
97	July 12	Guardians	2–5	Cantillo (8–4)	**Phillips** (2–4)	—	17,147	52–45	L3
–	July 14	96th All-Star Game	American League vs. National League (Citizens Bank Park, Philadelphia, Pennsylvania)						
98	July 17	@ Brewers	1–2 (10)	Yoho (1–0)	**Bachar** (1–1)	—	38,566	52–46	L4
99	July 18	@ Brewers	6–8	Drohan (5–3)	**Faucher** (4–5)	Megill (15)	40,144	52–47	L5
100	July 19	@ Brewers	1–3	Anderson (3–3)	**Fairbanks** (3–4)	—	36,451	52–48	L6
101	July 20	@ Astros	5–8	De Los Santos (1–3)	**Junk** (4–6)	—	23,684	52–49	L7
102	July 21	@ Astros	3–5	Imai (6–4)	**Phillips** (2–5)	Hader (11)	28,748	52–50	L8
103	July 22	@ Astros	2–5	Okert (3–1)	**Alcántara** (10–6)	Abreu (6)	26,099	52–51	L9
104	July 24	Padres	2–4	Morejón (8–2)	**Zuber** (0–1)	Miller (26)	16,151	52–52	L10
105	July 25	Padres	2–7	Sears (3–3)	**Pérez** (5–8)	—	22,319	52–53	L11
106	July 26	Padres	3–5	Peralta (2–2)	**Bachar** (1–2)	Miller (27)	21,675	52–54	L12
107	July 27	Phillies	8–7	**Faucher** (5–5)	Durán (1–4)	—	11,041	53–54	W1
108	July 28	Phillies	1–0	**Alcántara** (11–6)	Nola (3–9)	**Fairbanks** (14)	12,010	54–54	W2
109	July 29	Phillies	8–6	**Zuber** (1–1)	Bowlan (2–1)	**Fairbanks** (15)	14,350	55–54	W3
110	July 30	@ Mets	2–4	Raley (5–5)	**Petersen** (1–2)	Williams (16)	25,774	55–55	L1
111	July 31	@ Mets	5–2	**Junk** (5–6)	Senga (0–8)	**Fairbanks** (16)	33,064	56–55	W1

August: 13–14 (Home: 8–4; Road: 5–10)

#	Date	Opponent	Score	Win	Loss	Save	Attendance	Record	Box/Streak
112	August 1	@ Mets	6–2	**Phillips** (3–5)	Thornton (2–2)	**Bachar** (2)	30,078	57–55	W2
113	August 2	@ Mets	2–0	**Alcántara** (12–6)	Stock (0–1)	**Fairbanks** (17)	32,109	58–55	W3
114	August 4	@ Braves	2–4	Holmes (7–4)	**Gusto** (0–3)	Iglesias (25)	26,374	58–56	L1
115	August 5	@ Braves	1–4	Elder (8–6)	**Pérez** (5–9)	Fuentes (2)	25,136	58–57	L2
116	August 6	@ Braves	3–11	Mederos (2–0)	**Junk** (5–7)	—	33,500	58–58	L3
117	August 7	Angels	3–4	Anderson (2–0)	**Ekness** (0–1)	Fermín (1)	16,506	58–59	L4
118	August 8	Angels	7–0	**Alcántara** (13–6)	Ureña (7–8)	—	16,045	59–59	W1
119	August 9	Angels	12–3	**Petersen** (2–2)	Rodríguez (3–5)	—	13,215	60–59	W2
120	August 11	Pirates	2–0	**Pérez** (6–9)	Skenes (9–11)	**Fairbanks** (18)	9,366	61–59	W3
121	August 12	Pirates	8–2	**Junk** (6–7)	Mlodzinski (6–5)	—	7,441	62–59	W4
122	August 13	Pirates	1–13	Ashcraft (12–5)	**Phillips** (3–6)	—	8,223	62–60	L1
123	August 14	@ Reds	0–1	Burns (14–2)	**Alcántara** (13–7)	Pagán (15)	21,232	62–61	L2
124	August 15	@ Reds	8–4	**Zuber** (2–1)	Antone (2–1)	—	38,302	63–61	W1
125	August 16	@ Reds	7–1	**Ekness** (1–1)	Antone (2–2)	—	24,092	64–61	W2
126	August 17	@ Phillies	5–6	Sánchez (16–4)	**Junk** (6–8)	Durán (27)	37,544	64–62	L1
127	August 18	@ Phillies	4–6	McFarlane (1–1)	**Petersen** (2–3)	Raley (1)	39,237	64–63	L2
128	August 19	@ Phillies	1–4	Nola (5–9)	**Alcántara** (13–8)	Durán (28)	37,031	64–64	L3
129	August 21	Nationals	3–2	**Fairbanks** (4–4)	Beeter (5–4)	—	13,941	65–64	W1
130	August 22	Nationals	4–2	**Pérez** (7–9)	Irvin (2–8)	**Faucher** (2)	18,473	66–64	W2
131	August 23	Nationals	6–2	**Petersen** (3–3)	Kent (0–2)	—	17,826	67–64	W3
132	August 24	Red Sox	2–4	Miller (3–0)	**Fairbanks** (4–5)	Chapman (30)	16,247	67–65	L1
133	August 25	Red Sox	3–7 (11)	Gamboa (1–0)	**Gibson** (2–1)	—	16,821	67–66	L2
134	August 26	Red Sox	4–0	**Gusto** (1–3)	Gray (16–4)	—	17,472	68–66	W1
135	August 28	@ Nationals	2–9	Kent (1–2)	**Pérez** (7–10)	—	18,047	68–67	L1
136	August 29	@ Nationals	4–5 (10)	Ribalta (1–2)	**Petersen** (3–4)	—	32,055	68–68	L2
137	August 30	@ Nationals	6–2	**Fulton** (1–0)	Kranick (0–1)	—	20,891	69–68	W1
138	August 31	@ Nationals	3–6	Waldron (2–2)	**Ekness** (1–2)	Tolman (1)	10,746	69–69	L1

September: 10–13 (Home: 4–7; Road: 6–6)

#	Date	Opponent	Score	Win	Loss	Save	Attendance	Record	Box/Streak
139	September 1	@ Royals	6–3	**Phillips** (4–6)	Dobnak (2–3)	—	13,330	70–69	W1
140	September 2	@ Royals	9–6	**Gibson** (3–1)	Cuas (0–1)	**Faucher** (3)	10,913	71–69	W2
141	September 3	@ Royals	3–7	Wacha (9–8)	**Alcántara** (13–9)	—	10,803	71–70	L1
142	September 4	Cubs	1–6	Imanaga (9–10)	**Junk** (6–9)	Civale (2)	17,470	71–71	L2
143	September 5	Cubs	5–6	Rolison (8–1)	**Gusto** (1–4)	Zeferjahn (5)	26,141	71–72	L3
144	September 6	Cubs	10–3	**Phillips** (5–6)	Holmes (6–7)	—	29,526	72–72	W1
145	September 7	Mets	4–9	Tong (2–1)	**Pérez** (7–11)	—	16,007	72–73	L1
146	September 8	Mets	5–7	Manaea (5–7)	**Alcántara** (13–10)	Senga (7)	9,470	72–74	L2
147	September 9	Mets	14–15	Duarte (2–0)	**Ekness** (1–3)	Myers (2)	10,955	72–75	L3
148	September 11	Dodgers	2–6	Snell (4–1)	**Gusto** (1–5)	—	29,370	72–76	L4
149	September 12	Dodgers	4–3	**Gibson** (4–1)	Glasnow (4–1)	**Fairbanks** (19)	34,814	73–76	W1
150	September 13	Dodgers	6–4	**Fulton** (2–0)	Scott (1–6)	—	32,003	74–76	W2
151	September 14	@ Diamondbacks	7–8	Morillo (4–4)	**Ralston** (0–1)	—	19,434	74–77	L1
152	September 15	@ Diamondbacks	4–2 (11)	**Ekness** (2–3)	Clarke (2–4)	—	24,869	75–77	W1
153	September 16	@ Diamondbacks	4–3	**Gibson** (5–1)	Kelly (9–13)	**Alcántara** (1)	22,162	76–77	W2
154	September 18	@ Padres	2–8	Pivetta (3–2)	**Gibson** (5–2)	—	42,765	76–78	L1
155	September 19	@ Padres	6–7 (10)	Morgan (4–1)	**Ekness** (2–4)	—	43,433	76–79	L2
156	September 20	@ Padres	3–7	Buehler (9–6)	**Alcántara** (13–11)	—	40,847	76–80	L3
157	September 22	@ Cubs	8–2 (12)	**Ekness** (3–4)	Thielbar (3–4)	—	33,759	77–80	W1
158	September 23	@ Cubs	3–2	**Gibson** (6–2)	Rolison (9–2)	**Alcántara** (2)	36,635	78–80	W2
159	September 24	@ Cubs	1–2	Boyd (10–5)	**Ralston** (0–2)	Zeferjahn (7)	35,410	78–81	L1
160	September 25	Braves	3–0	**Pérez** (8–11)	Holmes (10–6)	—	26,060	79–81	W1
161	September 26	Braves	3–8	Mederos (6–1)	**Ralston** (0–3)	—	35,414	79–82	L1
162	September 27	Braves	5–3	**Petersen** (4–4)	Ritchie (1–5)	**Alcántara** (3)	35,730	80–82	W1

== Roster ==
2026 Miami Marlins
Roster
Pitchers: 22 Sandy Alcántara; 84 Lake Bachar; 37 Anthony Bender; 31 Bradley Blalock; 62 Zach Brzykcy; 95 Josh Ekness; 29 Pete Fairbanks; 53 Calvin Faucher; 90 Dax Fulton; 20 Braxton Garrett; 58 Cade Gibson; 65 Ryan Gusto; 26 Janson Junk; 71 William Kempner; 47 John King; 23 Max Meyer; 44 Patrick Monteverde; 43 Andrew Nardi; 33 Chris Paddack; 39 Eury Pérez; 49 Michael Petersen; 30 Tyler Phillips; 79 Jack Ralston; 61 Robby Snelling; 38 Victor Vodnik; 59 Josh White; 55 Tyler Zuber	Catchers: 34 Liam Hicks; 80 Joe Mack; 64 Brian Navarreto; 50 Agustín Ramírez; Infielders: 63 Deyvison De Los Santos; 9 Xavier Edwards; 19 Leo Jiménez; 6 Otto Lopez; 5 Christopher Morel; 1 Connor Norby; 21 Graham Pauley; 8 Javier Sanoja; 68 Jared Serna; 28 Kyle Stowers	Outfielders: 17 Owen Caissie; 18 Griffin Conine; 13 Heriberto Hernández; 87 Jakob Marsee; 3 Esteury Ruiz; 15 Austin Slater; 28 Kyle Stowers; Other batters: 40 Rece Hinds	Manager: 86 Clayton McCullough; Coaches: 48 Blake Butler (infield); 82 Corbin Day (assistant hitting); 81 Craig Driver (first base / catching instructor); 97 Tanner Garrison (bullpen catcher); 85 Pedro Guerrero (hitting); 70 Chris Hess (assistant hitting); 45 Blake Lalli (third base); 72 Aaron Leanhardt (field coordinator); 56 Rob Marcello (assistant pitching); 52 Brandon Mann (bullpen / pitching strategist); 57 Daniel Moskos (pitching); -- Bryson Nakamura (performance); 25 Carson Vitale (bench); 98 Harry Wilonsky (bullpen catcher)

== Player stats ==
= Indicates team leader

= Indicates league leader

=== Batting ===
Note: G = Games played; AB = At bats; R = Runs scored; H = Hits; 2B = Doubles; 3B = Triples; HR = Home runs; RBI = Runs batted in; SB = Stolen bases; BB = Walks; AVG = Batting average; SLG = Slugging average

Player	G	AB	R	H	2B	3B	HR	RBI	SB	BB	AVG	SLG
Otto Lopez	157	627	94	191	32	9	11	71	34	40	.305	.437
Xavier Edwards	142	518	61	145	17	6	6	52	21	68	.280	.371
Jakob Marsee	155	516	83	119	19	7	11	41	23	78	.231	.359
Javier Sanoja	144	461	50	136	32	5	11	69	11	27	295	.458
Heriberto Hernández	130	448	51	102	17	2	25	67	13	52	.228	.442
Kyle Stowers	121	447	57	107	27	4	21	65	1	52	.239	.459
Liam Hicks	101	354	54	100	9	1	14	62	3	40	.282	.432
Joe Mack	105	303	40	71	9	0	14	52	0	19	.234	.403
Owen Caissie	108	291	45	64	14	0	14	58	5	27	.220	.412
Griffin Conine	94	284	45	75	8	0	19	43	3	34	.264	.493
Agustín Ramírez	72	226	31	53	10	1	5	24	4	26	.235	.354
Esteury Ruiz	109	213	38	46	12	1	6	17	34	26	.216	.366
Connor Norby	65	200	17	41	12	0	4	16	6	24	.205	.325
Leo Jiménez	66	166	18	33	4	0	2	14	1	18	.199	.259
Graham Pauley	62	142	15	30	9	1	4	25	1	8	.211	.373
Christopher Morel	22	68	3	11	3	0	0	1	1	4	.162	.206
Brian Navarreto	32	52	8	7	3	0	1	3	0	2	.135	.250
Deyvison De Los Santos	18	42	1	6	2	0	0	0	0	0	.143	.190
Jared Serna	17	28	3	6	3	0	0	4	0	3	.214	.321
Austin Slater	12	23	1	4	0	0	0	1	1	4	.174	.174
Rece Hinds	1	2	0	0	0	0	0	0	0	0	.000	.000
Totals	162	5411	715	1347	242	37	168	685	163	552	.249	.400

=== Pitching ===
Note: W = Wins; L = Losses; ERA = Earned run average; G = Games pitched; GS = Games started; SV = Saves; IP = Innings pitched; H = Hits allowed; R = Runs allowed; ER = Earned runs allowed; BB = Walks allowed; SO = Strikeouts

Player	W	L	ERA	G	GS	SV	IP	H	R	ER	BB	SO
Sandy Alcántara	13	11	3.87	36	33	3	214.0	204	97	92	59	153
Eury Pérez	8	11	3.91	30	29	0	159.0	124	77	69	68	170
Tyler Phillips	5	6	3.34	37	20	2	126.2	112	50	47	56	101
Janson Junk	6	9	4.22	26	25	0	123.2	127	63	58	33	89
Max Meyer	9	1	2.68	20	20	0	111.0	85	39	33	41	121
Ryan Gusto	1	5	4.09	23	18	0	88.0	99	43	40	28	74
Calvin Faucher	5	5	3.56	69	0	3	68.1	53	33	27	37	73
Michael Peterson	4	4	3.02	65	0	1	65.2	45	25	22	29	81
Lake Bachar	1	2	3.84	38	4	2	58.2	43	27	25	21	61
Cade Gibson	6	2	5.36	47	1	0	50.1	49	35	30	21	44
John King	6	2	3.99	50	1	1	49.2	33	24	22	17	33
Pete Fairbanks	4	5	6.31	46	1	19	41.1	35	32	29	21	57
Tyler Zuber	2	1	5.67	44	0	1	39.2	46	27	25	11	42
Anthony Bender	1	1	2.62	35	0	2	34.1	21	10	10	12	41
Josh Ekness	3	4	3.23	30	0	1	30.2	23	16	11	20	24
Chris Paddack	0	5	7.63	7	6	0	30.2	41	27	26	10	27
Dax Fulton	2	0	3.77	16	0	0	28.2	23	12	12	15	29
Andrew Nardi	3	3	5.16	25	0	0	22.2	21	13	13	11	27
Victor Vodnik	0	0	4.37	20	0	0	22.2	16	13	11	14	18
Jack Ralston	0	3	5.71	16	1	0	17.1	15	11	11	9	19
William Kempner	1	0	2.92	9	0	0	12.1	8	4	4	4	14
Bradley Blalock	0	0	5.56	4	0	0	11.1	11	7	7	4	12
Robby Snelling	0	1	5.40	1	1	0	5.0	5	3	3	4	2
Javier Sanoja	0	0	13.50	5	0	0	4.2	11	7	7	1	1
Braxton Garrett	0	1	14.54	2	2	0	4.1	7	7	7	8	5
Patrick Monteverde	0	0	9.00	1	0	0	4.0	5	4	4	1	2
Zach Brzykcy	0	0	3.00	2	0	0	3.0	3	1	1	2	2
Josh White	0	0	67.50	1	0	0	0.2	1	5	5	4	1
Totals	80	82	4.09	162	162	35	1428.1	1266	712	649	561	1323

== Farm system ==
Level	Team	League	Manager
Triple-A	Jacksonville Jumbo Shrimp	International League	David Carpenter
Double-A	Pensacola Blue Wahoos	Southern League	Nelson Prada
High-A	Beloit Sky Carp	Midwest League	Angel Espada
Single-A	Jupiter Hammerheads	Florida State League	Kyle Stahlberg
Rookie	FCL Marlins	Florida Complex League	Joel Avina
Rookie	DSL Miami	Dominican Summer League	Oscar Escobar
Rookie	DSL Marlins	Dominican Summer League	Carlos Mota
