= 2027 Miami Marlins season =

2027 Miami Marlins
- League: National League
- Division: East
- Ballpark: LoanDepot Park
- City: Miami, Florida
- Record: {
- Owner: Bruce Sherman
- President of baseball operations: Peter Bendix
- General manager: Gabe Kapler
- Manager: Clayton McCullough
- Television: MLB Local Media
- Radio: WINZ; Miami Marlins Radio Network (English)

The 2027 Miami Marlins season is scheduled to be the 35th season for the Major League Baseball (MLB) franchise in the National League (NL). The Marlins play their home games at LoanDepot Park as members of the NL East division. The Marlins would attempt to return to the playoffs for the first time since 2023.

The season is contingent on Major League Baseball (MLB) and the Major League Baseball Players Association (MLBPA) signing a new collective bargaining agreement (CBA). Without a new CBA, MLB is expected to lock out the players on December 2, 2026, until one is signed. If such a lockout extends indefinitely, the season could be postponed, shortened, or even cancelled.

== Game log ==
The 2027 schedule is tentative until a new collective bargaining agreement (CBA) is signed between Major League Baseball (MLB) and the Major League Baseball Players Association (MLBPA). If the labor dispute extends into late February or early March, MLB would then start to consider whether to postpone or shorten the season.

Legend
	Marlins win
	Marlins loss
	Postponement
**Bold**	Marlins team member

2027 Game Log: 0–0 (Home: 0–0; Road: 0–0)
March/April: 0–0 (Home: 0–0; Road: 0–0)

#	Date	Opponent	Score	Win	Loss	Save	Attendance	Record	Box/Streak
1	March 25	Mets	—	—	—	—	—	–	—
2	March 27	Mets	—	—	—	—	—	–	—
3	March 28	Mets	—	—	—	—	—	–	—
4	March 29	Phillies	—	—	—	—	—	–	—
5	March 30	Phillies	—	—	—	—	—	–	—
6	March 31	Phillies	—	—	—	—	—	–	—
7	April 2	@ Diamondbacks	—	—	—	—	—	–	—
8	April 3	@ Diamondbacks	—	—	—	—	—	–	—
9	April 4	@ Diamondbacks	—	—	—	—	—	–	—
10	April 5	@ Rockies	—	—	—	—	—	–	—
11	April 6	@ Rockies	—	—	—	—	—	–	—
12	April 7	@ Rockies	—	—	—	—	—	–	—
13	April 9	Braves	—	—	—	—	—	–	—
14	April 10	Braves	—	—	—	—	—	–	—
15	April 11	Braves	—	—	—	—	—	–	—
16	April 13	Diamondbacks	—	—	—	—	—	–	—
17	April 14	Diamondbacks	—	—	—	—	—	–	—
18	April 15	Diamondbacks	—	—	—	—	—	–	—
19	April 16	@ Braves	—	—	—	—	—	–	—
20	April 17	@ Braves	—	—	—	—	—	–	—
21	April 18	@ Braves	—	—	—	—	—	–	—
22	April 19	Reds	—	—	—	—	—	–	—
23	April 20	Reds	—	—	—	—	—	–	—
24	April 21	Reds	—	—	—	—	—	–	—
25	April 23	@ Orioles	—	—	—	—	—	–	—
26	April 24	@ Orioles	—	—	—	—	—	–	—
27	April 25	@ Orioles	—	—	—	—	—	–	—
28	April 26	@ Reds	—	—	—	—	—	–	—
29	April 27	@ Reds	—	—	—	—	—	–	—
30	April 28	@ Reds	—	—	—	—	—	–	—
31	April 30	Astros	—	—	—	—	—	–	—

May: 0–0 (Home: 0–0; Road: 0–0)

#	Date	Opponent	Score	Win	Loss	Save	Attendance	Record	Box/Streak
32	May 1	Astros	—	—	—	—	—	–	—
33	May 2	Astros	—	—	—	—	—	–	—
34	May 3	Nationals	—	—	—	—	—	–	—
35	May 4	Nationals	—	—	—	—	—	–	—
36	May 5	Nationals	—	—	—	—	—	–	—
37	May 6	Nationals	—	—	—	—	—	–	—
38	May 7	Yankees	—	—	—	—	—	–	—
39	May 8	Yankees	—	—	—	—	—	–	—
40	May 9	Yankees	—	—	—	—	—	–	—
41	May 11	@ Cubs	—	—	—	—	—	–	—
42	May 12	@ Cubs	—	—	—	—	—	–	—
43	May 13	@ Cubs	—	—	—	—	—	–	—
44	May 14	@ White Sox	—	—	—	—	—	–	—
45	May 15	@ White Sox	—	—	—	—	—	–	—
46	May 16	@ White Sox	—	—	—	—	—	–	—
47	May 17	@ Phillies	—	—	—	—	—	–	—
48	May 18	@ Phillies	—	—	—	—	—	–	—
49	May 19	@ Phillies	—	—	—	—	—	–	—
50	May 21	Brewers	—	—	—	—	—	–	—
51	May 22	Brewers	—	—	—	—	—	–	—
52	May 23	Brewers	—	—	—	—	—	–	—
53	May 24	Tigers	—	—	—	—	—	–	—
54	May 25	Tigers	—	—	—	—	—	–	—
55	May 26	Tigers	—	—	—	—	—	–	—
56	May 28	@ Nationals	—	—	—	—	—	–	—
57	May 29	@ Nationals	—	—	—	—	—	–	—
58	May 30	@ Nationals	—	—	—	—	—	–	—
59	May 31	Cubs	—	—	—	—	—	–	—

June: 0–0 (Home: 0–0; Road: 0–0)

#	Date	Opponent	Score	Win	Loss	Save	Attendance	Record	Box/Streak
60	June 1	Cubs	—	—	—	—	—	–	—
61	June 2	Cubs	—	—	—	—	—	–	—
62	June 3	@ Mets	—	—	—	—	—	–	—
63	June 4	@ Mets	—	—	—	—	—	–	—
64	June 5	@ Mets	—	—	—	—	—	–	—
65	June 6	@ Mets	—	—	—	—	—	–	—
66	June 8	@ Red Sox	—	—	—	—	—	–	—
67	June 9	@ Red Sox	—	—	—	—	—	–	—
68	June 10	@ Red Sox	—	—	—	—	—	–	—
69	June 11	Padres	—	—	—	—	—	–	—
70	June 12	Padres	—	—	—	—	—	–	—
71	June 13	Padres	—	—	—	—	—	–	—
72	June 14	Blue Jays	—	—	—	—	—	–	—
73	June 15	Blue Jays	—	—	—	—	—	–	—
74	June 16	Blue Jays	—	—	—	—	—	–	—
75	June 18	@ Dodgers	—	—	—	—	—	–	—
76	June 19	@ Dodgers	—	—	—	—	—	–	—
77	June 20	@ Dodgers	—	—	—	—	—	–	—
78	June 21	@ Mariners	—	—	—	—	—	–	—
79	June 22	@ Mariners	—	—	—	—	—	–	—
80	June 23	@ Mariners	—	—	—	—	—	–	—
81	June 25	Dodgers	—	—	—	—	—	–	—
82	June 26	Dodgers	—	—	—	—	—	–	—
83	June 27	Dodgers	—	—	—	—	—	–	—
84	June 28	Cardinals	—	—	—	—	—	–	—
85	June 29	Cardinals	—	—	—	—	—	–	—
86	June 30	Cardinals	—	—	—	—	—	–	—

July: 0–0 (Home: 0–0; Road: 0–0)

#	Date	Opponent	Score	Win	Loss	Save	Attendance	Record	Box/Streak
87	July 1	Pirates	—	—	—	—	—	–	—
88	July 2	Pirates	—	—	—	—	—	–	—
89	July 3	Pirates	—	—	—	—	—	–	—
90	July 4	Pirates	—	—	—	—	—	–	—
91	July 6	@ Mets	—	—	—	—	—	–	—
92	July 7	@ Mets	—	—	—	—	—	–	—
93	July 8	@ Mets	—	—	—	—	—	–	—
94	July 9	@ Pirates	—	—	—	—	—	–	—
95	July 10	@ Pirates	—	—	—	—	—	–	—
96	July 11	@ Pirates	—	—	—	—	—	–	—
–	July 13	97th All-Star Game	American League vs. National League (Wrigley Field, Chicago, Illinois)						
97	July 16	Rays	—	—	—	—	—	–	—
98	July 17	Rays	—	—	—	—	—	–	—
99	July 18	Rays	—	—	—	—	—	–	—
100	July 19	Nationals	—	—	—	—	—	–	—
101	July 20	Nationals	—	—	—	—	—	–	—
102	July 21	Nationals	—	—	—	—	—	–	—
103	July 22	@ Brewers	—	—	—	—	—	–	—
104	July 23	@ Brewers	—	—	—	—	—	–	—
105	July 24	@ Brewers	—	—	—	—	—	–	—
106	July 25	@ Brewers	—	—	—	—	—	–	—
107	July 26	@ Guardians	—	—	—	—	—	–	—
108	July 27	@ Guardians	—	—	—	—	—	–	—
109	July 28	@ Guardians	—	—	—	—	—	–	—
110	July 30	Phillies	—	—	—	—	—	–	—
111	July 31	Phillies	—	—	—	—	—	–	—

August: 0–0 (Home: 0–0; Road: 0–0)

#	Date	Opponent	Score	Win	Loss	Save	Attendance	Record	Box/Streak
112	August 1	Phillies	—	—	—	—	—	–	—
113	August 3	Athletics	—	—	—	—	—	–	—
114	August 4	Athletics	—	—	—	—	—	–	—
115	August 5	Athletics	—	—	—	—	—	–	—
116	August 6	@ Padres	—	—	—	—	—	–	—
117	August 7	@ Padres	—	—	—	—	—	–	—
118	August 8	@ Padres	—	—	—	—	—	–	—
119	August 9	@ Angels	—	—	—	—	—	–	—
120	August 10	@ Angels	—	—	—	—	—	–	—
121	August 11	@ Angels	—	—	—	—	—	–	—
122	August 13	Giants	—	—	—	—	—	–	—
123	August 14	Giants	—	—	—	—	—	–	—
124	August 15	Giants	—	—	—	—	—	–	—
125	August 16	Braves	—	—	—	—	—	–	—
126	August 17	Braves	—	—	—	—	—	–	—
127	August 18	Braves	—	—	—	—	—	–	—
128	August 19	Braves	—	—	—	—	—	–	—
129	August 20	@ Giants	—	—	—	—	—	–	—
130	August 21	@ Giants	—	—	—	—	—	–	—
131	August 22	@ Giants	—	—	—	—	—	–	—
132	August 23	@ Cardinals	—	—	—	—	—	–	—
133	August 24	@ Cardinals	—	—	—	—	—	–	—
134	August 25	@ Cardinals	—	—	—	—	—	–	—
135	August 27	Royals	—	—	—	—	—	–	—
136	August 28	Royals	—	—	—	—	—	–	—
137	August 29	Royals	—	—	—	—	—	–	—
138	August 31	Mets	—	—	—	—	—	–	—

September: 0–0 (Home: 0–0; Road: 0–0)

#	Date	Opponent	Score	Win	Loss	Save	Attendance	Record	Box/Streak
139	September 1	Mets	—	—	—	—	—	–	—
140	September 2	Mets	—	—	—	—	—	–	—
141	September 3	@ Nationals	—	—	—	—	—	–	—
142	September 4	@ Nationals	—	—	—	—	—	–	—
143	September 5	@ Nationals	—	—	—	—	—	–	—
144	September 6	@ Phillies	—	—	—	—	—	–	—
145	September 7	@ Phillies	—	—	—	—	—	–	—
146	September 8	@ Phillies	—	—	—	—	—	–	—
147	September 9	@ Phillies	—	—	—	—	—	–	—
148	September 10	@ Rays	—	—	—	—	—	–	—
149	September 11	@ Rays	—	—	—	—	—	–	—
150	September 12	@ Rays	—	—	—	—	—	–	—
151	September 14	Rockies	—	—	—	—	—	–	—
152	September 15	Rockies	—	—	—	—	—	–	—
153	September 16	Rockies	—	—	—	—	—	–	—
154	September 17	Twins	—	—	—	—	—	–	—
155	September 18	Twins	—	—	—	—	—	–	—
156	September 19	Twins	—	—	—	—	—	–	—
157	September 21	@ Rangers	—	—	—	—	—	–	—
158	September 22	@ Rangers	—	—	—	—	—	–	—
159	September 23	@ Rangers	—	—	—	—	—	–	—
160	September 24	@ Braves	—	—	—	—	—	–	—
161	September 25	@ Braves	—	—	—	—	—	–	—
162	September 26	@ Braves	—	—	—	—	—	–	—

== Current roster ==
Miami Marlins 2027 spring training roster
40-man roster		Non-roster invitees	Coaches / other
Pitchers: 22 Sandy Alcántara; -- Jace Beck; 37 Anthony Bender; -- Brandan Bidois; -- Eliazar Dishmey; 95 Josh Ekness; 53 Calvin Faucher; 90 Dax Fulton; 58 Cade Gibson; 65 Ryan Gusto; 32 Ronny Henriquez; 26 Janson Junk; 71 William Kempner; 60 Adam Mazur; 23 Max Meyer; 43 Andrew Nardi; 39 Eury Pérez; 49 Michael Petersen; 30 Tyler Phillips; 79 Jack Ralston; 61 Robby Snelling; 38 Victor Vodnik; -- Cameron Weston; -- Brandon White	Catchers: 80 Joe Mack; Infielders: 24 Maximo Acosta; 63 Deyvison De Los Santos; 9 Xavier Edwards; 6 Otto Lopez; -- Juan Matheus; 8 Javier Sanoja; 68 Jared Serna; 28 Kyle Stowers; Outfielders: 17 Owen Caissie; 18 Griffin Conine; 13 Heriberto Hernández; 87 Jakob Marsee; 3 Esteury Ruiz; Designated hitters: 50 Agustín Ramírez		Manager: 86 Clayton McCullough; Coaches: 48 Blake Butler (infield); 82 Corbin Day (assistant hitting); 81 Craig Driver (first base / catching instructor); 97 Tanner Garrison (bullpen catcher); -- Dillon Lawson (hitting); 70 Chris Hess (assistant hitting); 45 Blake Lalli (third base); 72 Aaron Leanhardt (field coordinator); 56 Rob Marcello (assistant pitching); 52 Brandon Mann (bullpen / pitching strategist); 57 Daniel Moskos (pitching); -- Bryson Nakamura (performance); 25 Carson Vitale (bench); 98 Harry Wilonsky (bullpen catcher); 39 active, 0 inactive, 0 non-roster invitees; 7-, 10-, or 15-day injured list; * Not on active roster; ^{†} Suspended list; Roster, coaches, and NRIs updated November 17, 2026; Transactions • Depth chart; → All MLB rosters

== Farm system ==
Level	Team	League	Manager
Triple-A	Jacksonville Jumbo Shrimp	International League	
Double-A	Pensacola Blue Wahoos	Southern League	
High-A	Beloit Sky Carp	Midwest League	
Low-A	Jupiter Hammerheads	Florida State League	
Rookie	FCL Marlins	Florida Complex League	
Rookie	DSL Marlins	Dominican Summer League	
