= Graham Pauley =

American baseball player (born 2000)

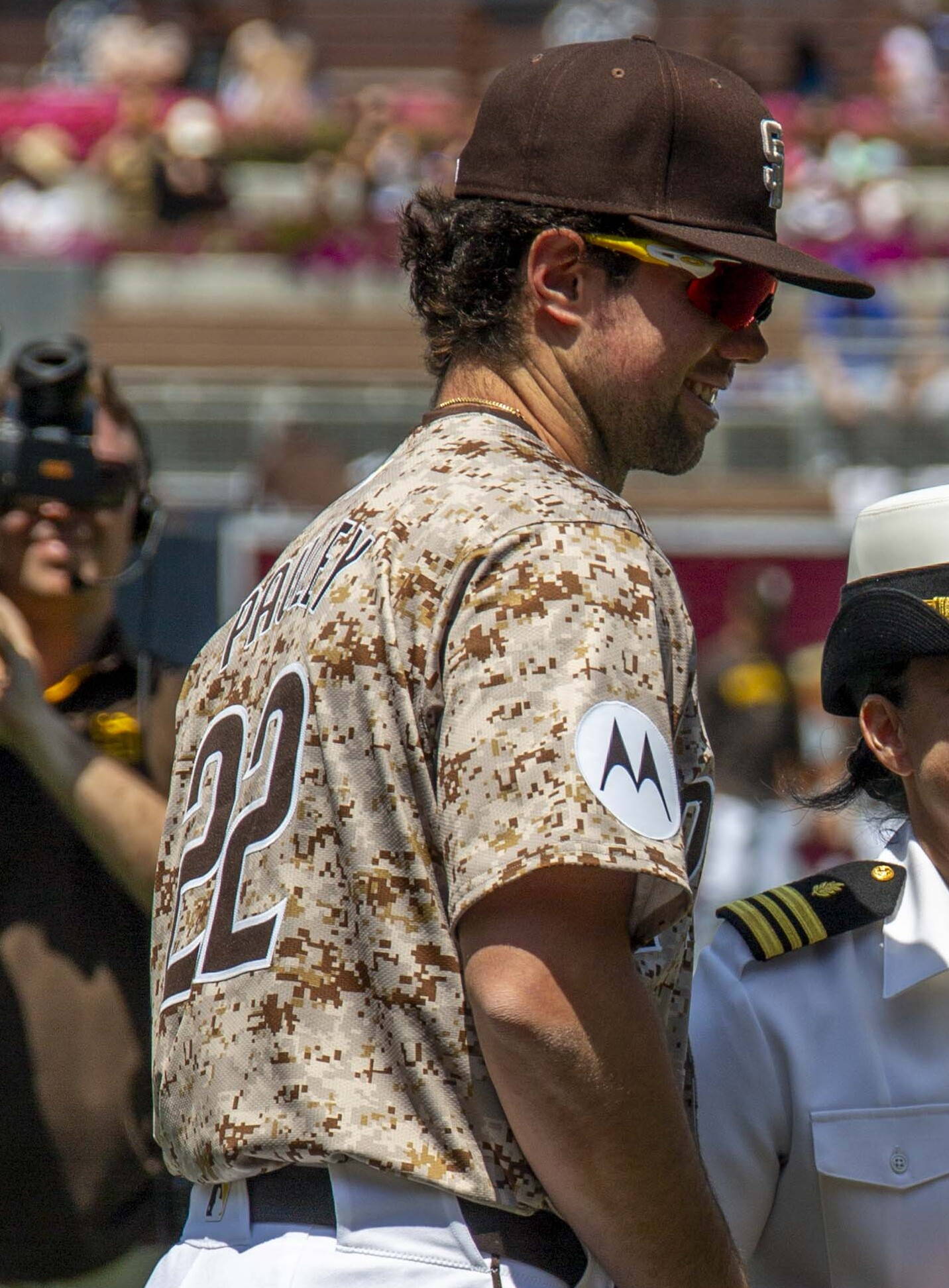
- Pauley with the San Diego Padres in 2024

Chicago White Sox
- Infielder
- Born: September 24, 2000 (age 26); Alpharetta, Georgia, U.S.
- Bats: Left Throws: Right

MLB debut
- March 20, 2024, for the San Diego Padres

MLB statistics (through 2026 season)
- Batting average: .209
- Home runs: 10
- Runs batted in: 41
- Stats at Baseball Reference

Teams
- San Diego Padres (2024); Miami Marlins (2025–2026)

Graham Austin Pauley (born September 24, 2000) is an American professional baseball infielder for the Chicago White Sox of Major League Baseball (MLB). He has previously played in MLB for the San Diego Padres and Miami Marlins. He made his MLB debut in 2024.

== Amateur career ==
Pauley attended Milton High School in Milton, Georgia and played college baseball at Duke University. In 2022, he played collegiate summer baseball with the Cotuit Kettleers and the Harwich Mariners of the Cape Cod Baseball League.

== Professional career ==
=== San Diego Padres ===
The San Diego Padres selected Pauley in the 13th round, with the 390th overall selection, of the 2022 Major League Baseball draft. He signed with the Padres and started his professional career that year with the rookie–level Arizona Complex League Padres and Single–A Lake Elsinore Storm. In 32 total games, Pauley batted .276/.403/.476 with four home runs, 25 RBI, and six stolen bases.

Pauley played 2023 with Lake Elsinore, the High–A Fort Wayne TinCaps and Double–A San Antonio Missions. He was named the Padres minor league player of the year after hitting .308/.393/.539 with 23 home runs, 94 RBI, and 22 stolen bases across 127 total games. After the season, he played in the Arizona Fall League.

On March 19, 2024, the Padres selected Pauley's contract and added him to their Opening Day roster. On March 30, Pauley hit a three–run home run in the 9th inning against the San Francisco Giants for his first major league hit. In 13 games for San Diego, he batted .125/.125/.313 with two home runs and five RBI.

=== Miami Marlins ===
On July 30, 2024, the Padres traded Pauley, Robby Snelling, Adam Mazur, and Jay Beshears to the Miami Marlins in exchange for Bryan Hoeing and Tanner Scott. He spent the remainder of the year with the Double-A Pensacola Blue Wahoos, also playing in five games for the Triple-A Jacksonville Jumbo Shrimp. In 38 games for Pensacola, Pauley batted .239/.325/.384 with four home runs, 17 RBI, and four stolen bases.

Pauley was optioned to Triple-A Jacksonville to begin the 2025 season. However, following an injury to Connor Norby, Pauley was recalled to be a part of Miami's Opening Day roster.

Pauley made 62 appearances for Miami in 2026, batting .211/.257/.373 with four home runs and 25 RBI.

=== Chicago White Sox ===
On November 2, 2026, Pauley was claimed off of waivers by the Chicago White Sox.
