= Josh White (baseball) =

American baseball player (born 2000)

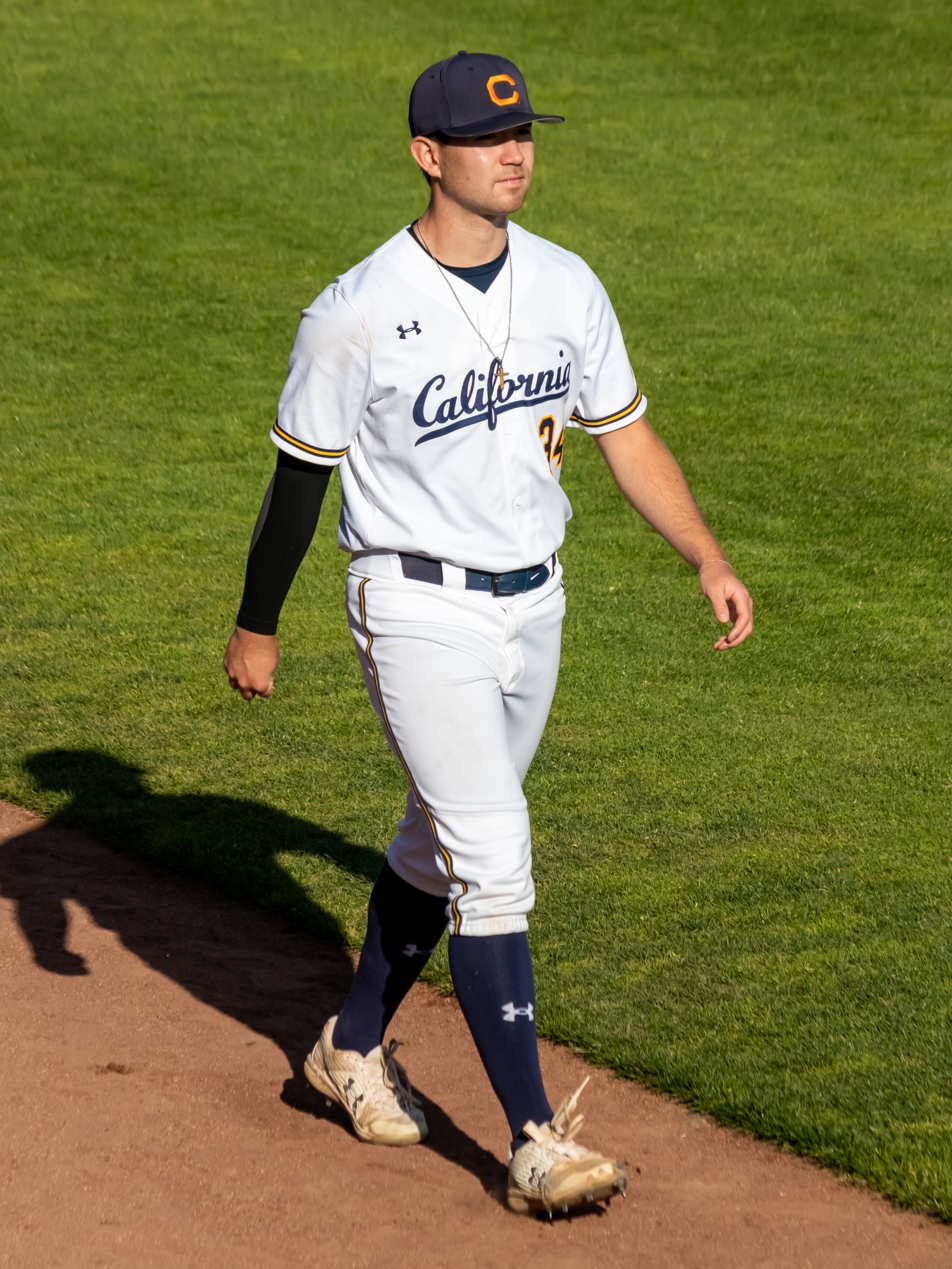
- White with Cal in 2022

Texas Rangers
- Pitcher
- Born: November 24, 2000 (age 25); Walnut Creek, California, U.S.
- Bats: Right Throws: Right

MLB debut
- May 31, 2026, for the Miami Marlins

MLB statistics (through 2026 season)
- Win–loss record: 0–0
- Earned run average: 67.50
- Strikeouts: 1
- Stats at Baseball Reference

Teams
- Miami Marlins (2026)

Joshua Lincoln White (born November 24, 2000) is an American professional baseball pitcher for the Texas Rangers of Major League Baseball (MLB). He has previously played in MLB for the Miami Marlins.

== Amateur career ==
White attended Monte Vista High School in Danville, California, where he pitched to a 0.92 earned run average (ERA) and 77 strikeouts as a senior in 2019. White enrolled at the University of California, Berkeley, where he played college baseball for the California Golden Bears. In 2022, he appeared in 16 games and went 2–6 with a 5.05 ERA and 91 strikeouts.

== Professional career ==
=== Miami Marlins ===
The Miami Marlins selected White in the fifth round of the 2022 Major League Baseball draft. White made his professional debut in 2022 with the Rookie-level Florida Complex League Marlins and he also played with the Single-A Jupiter Hammerheads, posting an ERA of 6.55 ERA over 11 innings. In 2023, he played with Jupiter and the High-A Beloit Sky Carp and pitched to a 2–7 record and a 3.46 ERA over 65 innings. White opened the 2024 season with Beloit and was promoted to the Double-A Pensacola Blue Wahoos during the season, and ended the year with a 2–1 record, a 3.02 ERA, and eighty strikeouts over 59 2/3 innings between the two teams. White was assigned to Pensacola to open the 2025 season and promoted to the Triple-A Jacksonville Jumbo Shrimp in June. Over 45 appearances between the two teams, he went 10–1 with a 1.86 ERA and 107 strikeouts over 67 2/3 innings. On November 18, the Marlins added White to their 40-man roster to protect him from the Rule 5 draft.

White was optioned to Jacksonville to begin the 2026 season. Across his first 17 appearances for the Jumbo Shrimp, he logged a 4-0 record and 1.33 ERA with 28 strikeouts and one save. On May 31, 2026, the Marlins promoted White to the major leagues for the first time. He made his MLB debut that day against the New York Mets, recording one out while giving up four walks and five runs; he was optioned back to Jacksonville the following day. This marked his only appearance for the Marlins in 2026, and he played the remainder of the season with Jacksonville, with whom he had a 2.41 ERA across 56 innings pitched.

=== Texas Rangers ===
On November 2, 2026, White was claimed off of waivers by the Baltimore Orioles. On November 17, 2026, White was claimed off waivers by the Texas Rangers.
