= Tanner Scott =

American baseball player (born 1994)

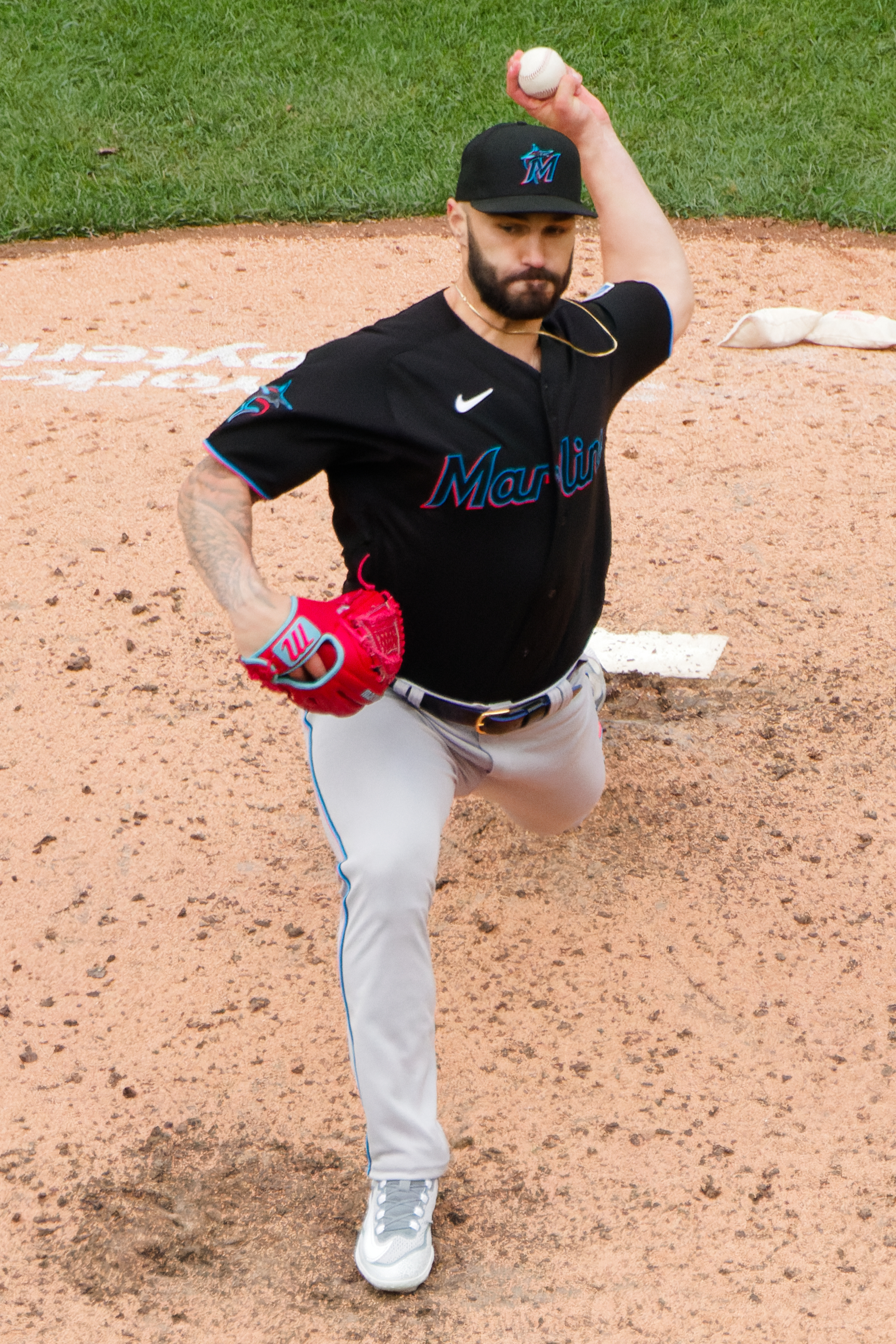
- Scott with the Marlins in 2023

Los Angeles Dodgers – No. 66
- Pitcher
- Born: July 22, 1994 (age 32); Warren, Ohio, U.S.
- Bats: Right Throws: Left

MLB debut
- September 20, 2017, for the Baltimore Orioles

MLB statistics (through 2026 season)
- Win–loss record: 33–34
- Earned run average: 3.59
- Strikeouts: 628
- Saves: 103
- Stats at Baseball Reference

Teams
- Baltimore Orioles (2017–2021); Miami Marlins (2022–2024); San Diego Padres (2024); Los Angeles Dodgers (2025–present)

Career highlights and awards
- All-Star (2024)

Tanner Alexander Scott (born July 22, 1994) is an American professional baseball pitcher for the Los Angeles Dodgers of Major League Baseball (MLB). He has previously played in MLB for the Baltimore Orioles, Miami Marlins, and San Diego Padres. He made his MLB debut in 2017 with the Orioles.

== Amateur career ==
Scott graduated from Howland High School in Howland Township, Ohio, in 2012. He then played college baseball at Notre Dame College in 2013 and Howard College in 2014. After the 2014 season, he briefly played collegiate summer baseball with the Chatham Anglers of the Cape Cod Baseball League. He was drafted by the Baltimore Orioles in the sixth round of the 2014 Major League Baseball draft.

== Professional career ==
=== Baltimore Orioles ===
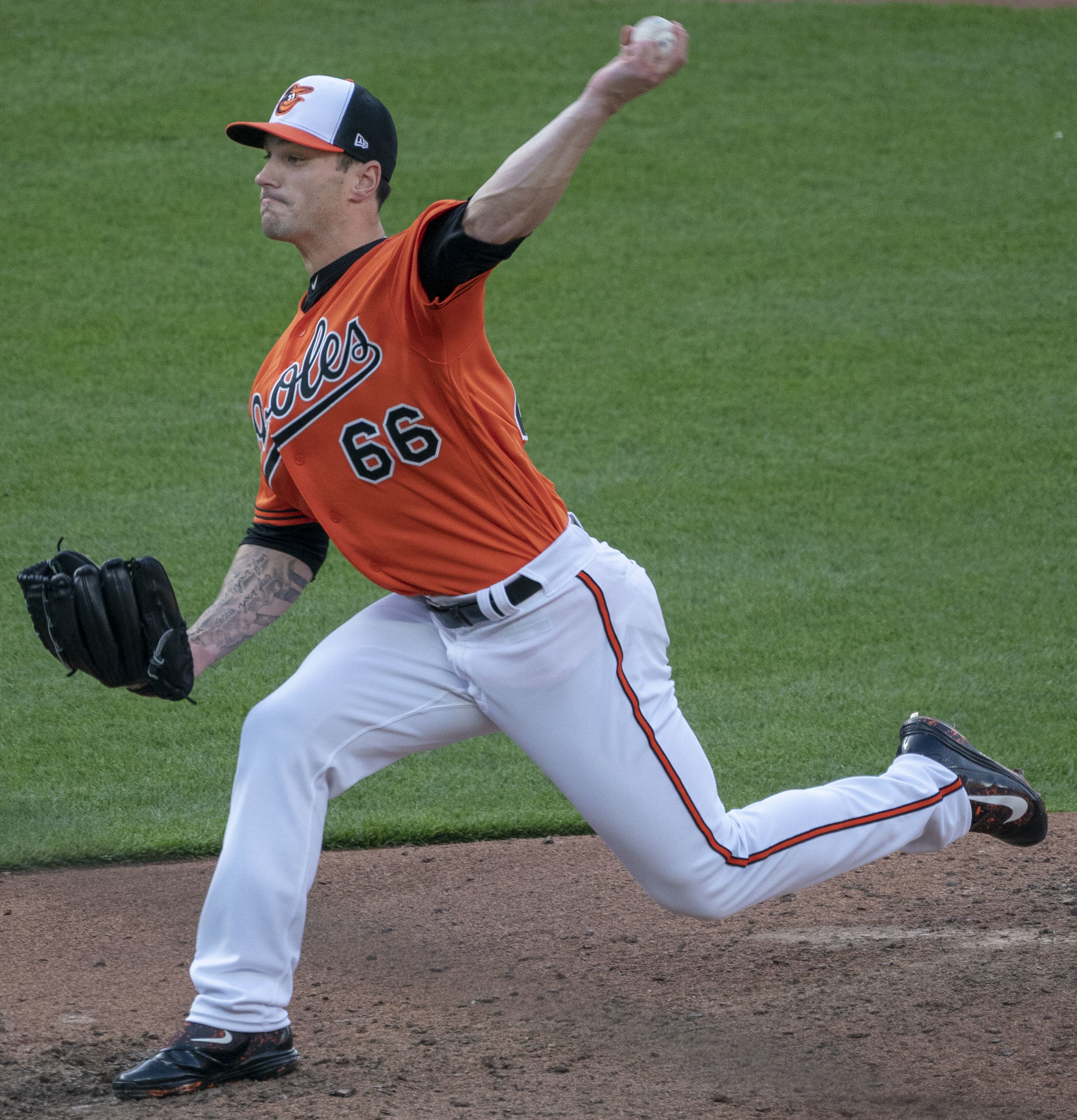
Scott with the Orioles in 2018

Scott signed with the Orioles on June 26, 2014, and made his professional debut with the Gulf Coast Orioles, where he has a 1-5 record with a 6.26 earned run average (ERA) in ten games (eight starts). In 2015, Scott pitched for both the Aberdeen IronBirds and Delmarva Shorebirds, where he posted a combined 4-3 record and 3.83 ERA in 42 1/3 innings pitched between the two clubs. After the season, he pitched in the Arizona Fall League. Scott spent 2016 with both the Frederick Keys and the Bowie Baysox, where he went 5-4 with a 4.76 ERA in 43 relief appearances between the two teams. In 2017, he played with Bowie where he compiled a 0-2 record and 2.22 ERA in 24 starts before being called up to the major leagues on September 17, 2017. He made his MLB debut on September 20, allowing two runs in one inning of work against the Boston Red Sox, while picking up his first MLB strikeout (of Deven Marrero). He appeared in one other game, retiring the two batters he faced on September 23 against the Tampa Bay Rays.

Scott worked regular one-inning stints for the Orioles during spring training before the 2018 season, creating speculation that the Orioles No. 6 prospect could pitch his way onto the major league roster early. The plan, however, was for Scott to pitch three-inning stints as a starter in five-man rotation for the Norfolk Tides.

After pitching out of the bullpen in Triple-A Norfolk's opening game on April 6, 2018, Scott was called up again on April 8 to join the Orioles bullpen — just as Jimmy Yacabonis was optioned to Norfolk. Scott was optioned back to Norfolk the next day, after pitching 1 2/3 innings against the Yankees the day before. He was recalled on April 20 prior to a Friday game against the Cleveland Indians, pitching two scoreless innings against the Indians the next day before being optioned once again on April 28. Baltimore recalled him again on May 9, sent him down on June 9 and recalled him again on June 15. In 53 appearances in the season, Scott worked in 53 1/3 innings, striking out 76 with a 5.40 ERA. He also made 10 appearances for Norfolk, allowing only one earned run in 12 innings.

In 2019, Scott appeared in 28 games for Baltimore, posting an ERA of 4.78 in 26 1/3 innings with 37 strikeouts and 30 games for Norfolk, with a 2.98 ERA and 57 strikeouts in 45 1/3 innings. In the pandemic shortened 2020 season, Scott pitched to a 1.31 ERA to go along with 23 strikeouts in 20 2/3 innings over 25 games. In 2021, he recorded a 5.17 ERA with 70 strikeouts and 37 walks in 54 innings.

=== Miami Marlins ===
On April 3, 2022, the Orioles traded Scott and Cole Sulser to the Miami Marlins in exchange for a draft pick in the Competitive Balance Round B of the 2022 MLB draft, two minor league prospects, Antonio Velez and Kevin Guerrero, and a player to be named later. (On June 3, Baltimore acquired minor league RHP Yaqui Rivera from Miami as the player to be named later). He made 67 relief outings during his first season with Miami, posting a 4.31 ERA with 90 strikeouts and 20 saves over 62 2/3 innings pitched.

On January 13, 2023, Scott agreed to a one-year, $2.825 million contract with the Marlins, avoiding salary arbitration and he became the team's closer, winning the National League Reliever of the Month Award for September/October. In 74 appearances out of the bullpen in 2023, he compiled a 9–5 record and 2.31 ERA with 104 strikeouts and 12 saves in 78 innings pitched. He also made his first postseason appearance, pitching a scoreless inning in the second game of the Wild Card Series against the Philadelphia Phillies.

Scott made 44 appearances for Miami in 2024, registering a 1.18 ERA with 53 strikeouts and 18 saves across 45 2/3 innings of work. He was also named an All-Star for the first time.

=== San Diego Padres ===
On July 30, 2024, the Marlins traded Scott and Bryan Hoeing to the San Diego Padres in exchange for Robby Snelling, Adam Mazur, Jay Beshears, and Graham Pauley. He pitched 26 1/3 innings for the Padres over 28 games, with a 3–1 record, 2.73 ERA, 31 strikeouts and four saves. He followed that up by pitching 4 1/3 scoreless innings, with seven strikeouts, in five postseason games. Four of his strikeouts were against NL MVP Shohei Ohtani of the Los Angeles Dodgers in the Division Series.

=== Los Angeles Dodgers ===
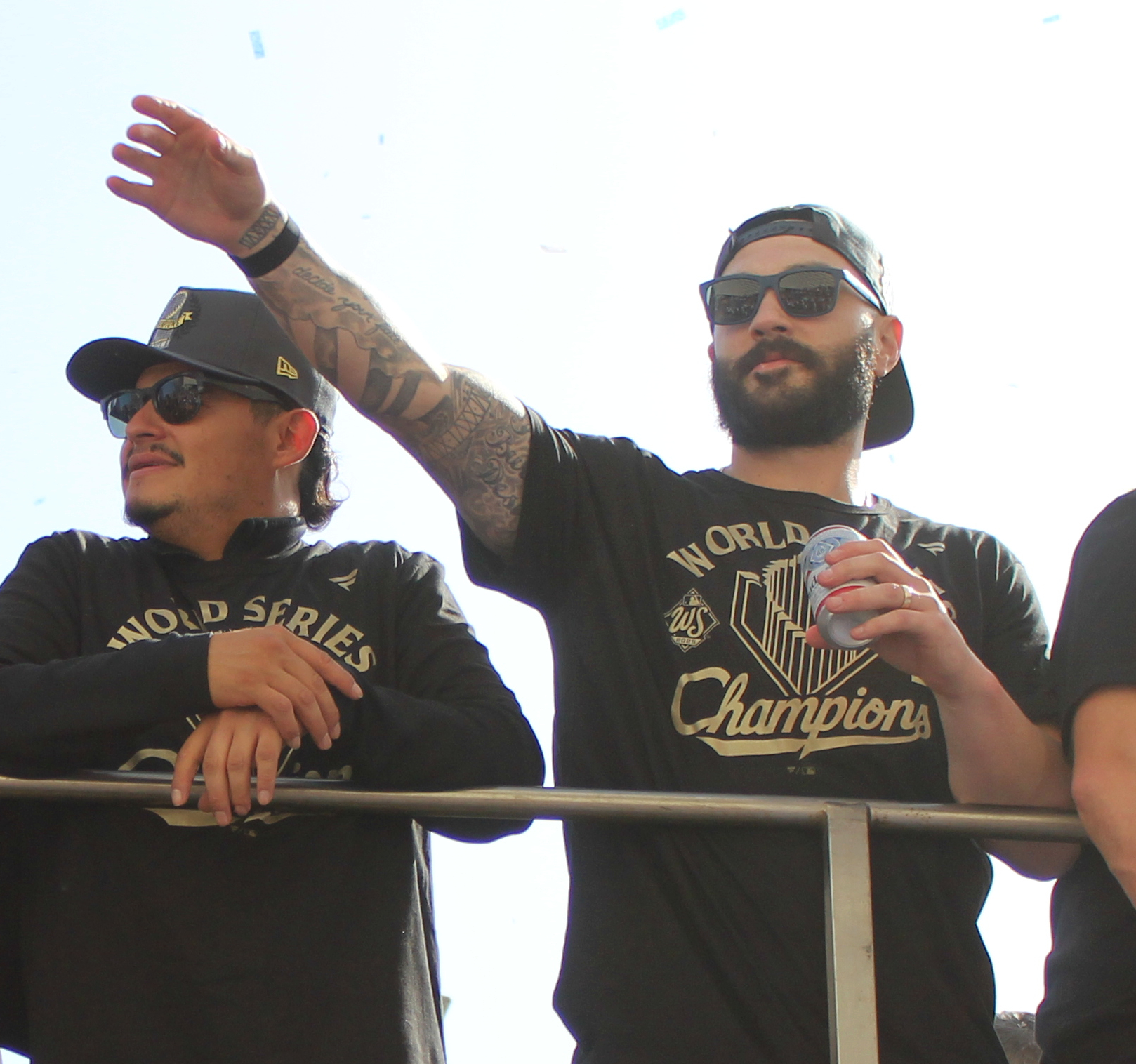
Tanner Scott at the Los Angeles Dodgers parade, 2025

On January 23, 2025, Scott signed a four-year, $72 million contract with the Los Angeles Dodgers, that also contained a conditional option for a fifth year if Scott were to suffer a serious injury during his contract.

On April 5, against the Philadelphia Phillies, Scott became just the fifth pitcher on record to record a save on three pitches while facing three batters. He joined Mariano Rivera (2003), Steve Reed (1994), Duane Ward (1993), and Barry Jones (1992). Scott pitched in 57 innings over 61 games, allowed 30 earned runs on 54 hits and 18 walks while striking out 60 and saving 23 games for the Dodgers. It was a difficult season for Scott, who led the league with 10 blown saves.

Scott did not pitch in the first two rounds of the postseason and was removed from the Division Series roster after game 3 following a lower-body abscess procedure. He remained inactive for the rest of the postseason.

In 2026, Scott produced better numbers, with a 2.69 ERA and 35 saves in 69 games and regaining his role as the closer with Edwin Díaz sidelined for much of the season with injuries.
