= Connor Norby =

American baseball player (born 2000)

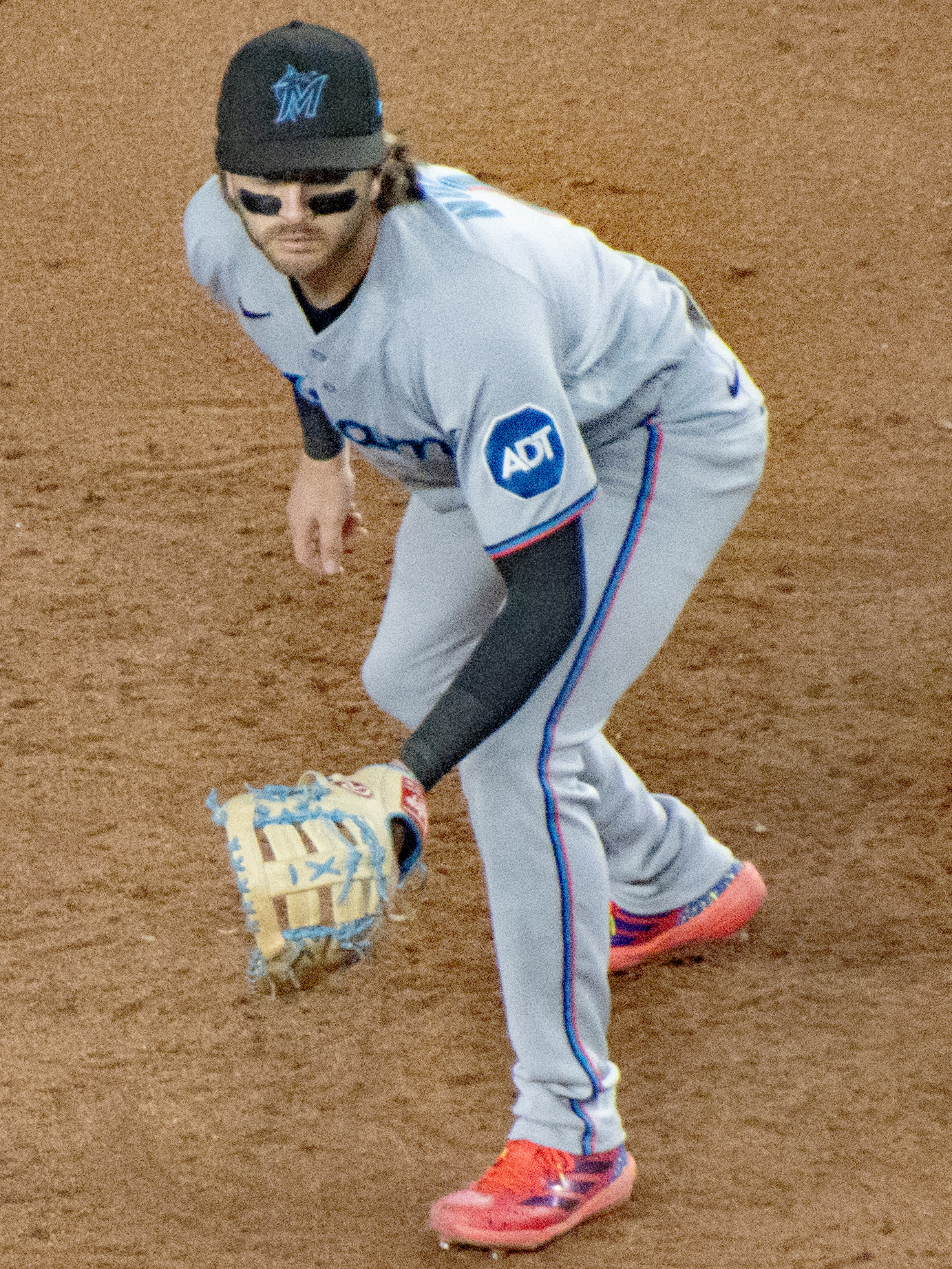
- Norby with the Miami Marlins in 2026

Colorado Rockies – No. 35
- Infielder
- Born: June 8, 2000 (age 26); Brooklyn Park, Minnesota, U.S.
- Bats: Right Throws: Right

MLB debut
- June 3, 2024, for the Baltimore Orioles

MLB statistics (through 2026 season)
- Batting average: .244
- Home runs: 24
- Runs batted in: 88
- Stats at Baseball Reference

Teams
- Baltimore Orioles (2024); Miami Marlins (2024–2026); Colorado Rockies (2026–present)

Connor David Norby (born June 8, 2000) is an American professional baseball infielder for the Colorado Rockies of Major League Baseball (MLB). He has previously played in MLB for the Baltimore Orioles and Miami Marlins. Norby played college baseball for the East Carolina Pirates.

== Early life and amateur career ==
Norby was born and lived in Brooklyn Park, Minnesota, until he moved to Kernersville, North Carolina, before starting high school at East Forsyth High School.

Norby enrolled at East Carolina University and played college baseball for the East Carolina Pirates. In his freshman season, he played in 26 games with two starts and batted .194. As a sophomore, he batted .403 with 25 hits and 14 runs scored in 17 games before the season was cut short due to the coronavirus pandemic. The following season, he batted .415 with 15 home runs, 15 doubles, 51 runs batted in (RBIs) and 18 stolen bases. He was named the American Athletic Conference Player of the Year. He led NCAA Division I with 102 total hits and was named a first team All-American by the American Baseball Coaches Association and Baseball America and won the Bobby Bragan Collegiate Slugger Award.

== Professional career ==
=== Baltimore Orioles ===
The Baltimore Orioles selected Norby in the second round, with the 41st overall pick, in the 2021 Major League Baseball draft. He signed with the team on July 16, 2021, and received a $1.7 million bonus. Norby was assigned to the Rookie-level Florida Complex League Orioles to start his professional career. He was later promoted to the Delmarva Shorebirds of the Low-A East. Over 33 games between the two teams, he slashed .264/.380/.405 with three home runs, 19 RBI, and six stolen bases.

For the start of the 2022 season, the Orioles assigned Norby to the High-A Aberdeen Ironbirds. Norby hit .237 with 8 home runs, 6 stolen bases, and an 8.8 walk percentage in 209 plate appearances with Aberdeen before he was promoted to the Double-A Bowie Baysox on June 27. He went 3-for-3 with a pair of runs scored, one RBI and walks each and a homer at the Triple-A National Championship Game won by the Norfolk Tides over the Oklahoma City Dodgers 7–6 on September 30. His homer to center came with two-outs in the 9th inning.

Norby spent the 2023 campaign with Norfolk, playing in 138 games and hitting .290/.359/.483 with 21 home runs, 92 RBI, and 10 stolen bases. He began 2024 with Norfolk, batting .286/.374/.510 with nine home runs, 36 RBI, and seven stolen bases across 51 contests.

On June 3, 2024, the Orioles selected Norby to the 40-man roster and promoted him to the major leagues for the first time. He went 0–for–3 with two swinging strikeouts as the starting second baseman in his MLB debut in a 7–2 away win over the Toronto Blue Jays later that evening. He achieved his first major league hit and RBI with a one-out two-run homer over the left-field wall off Nate Pearson in the eighth inning of a 10–1 victory over the same opponent the following night on June 4.

=== Miami Marlins ===
On July 30, 2024, the Orioles traded Norby and Kyle Stowers to the Miami Marlins in exchange for pitcher Trevor Rogers. He made 36 appearances for Miami down the stretch, batting .247/.315/.445 with seven home runs, 17 RBI, and three stolen bases.

On July 17, 2025, Norby underwent surgery to repair a fractured hamate bone in his left hand; he was subsequently ruled out for 6-to-8 weeks. Norby returned to action on August 29, and finished the year with a .251/.300/.389 batting line, eight home runs, 34 RBI, and eight stolen bases across 88 appearances.

=== Colorado Rockies ===
On August 3, 2026, the Marlins traded Norby and Aiden May to the Colorado Rockies in exchange for Victor Vodnik.

== Personal life ==
Norby's brother, Ethan, played baseball for the East Carolina Pirates. He was drafted in the fourth round of the 2026 MLB draft, pick number 122 overall, to the Cincinnati Reds.
