= Dax Fulton =

American baseball player (born 2001)

Miami Marlins – No. 90
- Pitcher
- Born: October 16, 2001 (age 24); Weatherford, Oklahoma, U.S.
- Bats: Left Throws: Left

MLB debut
- May 6, 2026, for the Miami Marlins

MLB statistics (through 2026 season)
- Win–loss record: 2–0
- Earned run average: 3.77
- Strikeouts: 29
- Stats at Baseball Reference

Teams
- Miami Marlins (2026–present)

Daxton James Fulton (born October 16, 2001) is an American professional baseball pitcher for the Miami Marlins of Major League Baseball (MLB). He made his MLB debut in 2026.

== Amateur career ==
Fulton went to Mustang High School in Mustang, Oklahoma, where he played baseball. He hit to a .427 batting average in his junior season. He tore a ligament in his pitching elbow at the end of his junior season of high school and opted to undergo Tommy John surgery, which made him miss his senior season. He committed to Vanderbilt to play college baseball on September 22, 2017, but he flipped his commitment to Oklahoma on October 3, 2019.

== Professional career ==
Fulton was drafted in the second round with the 40th overall pick in the 2020 Major League Baseball draft. Fulton signed for a $2.4 million signing bonus on July 20, 2020.

Fulton did not play in a game in 2020 due to the cancellation of the minor league season because of the COVID-19 pandemic. He made his professional debut in 2021 with the Jupiter Hammerheads and the Beloit Sky Carp, appearing in twenty games (19 starts) and going 2–5 with a 4.60 ERA and 84 strikeouts over 78 1/3 innings. He opened the 2022 season back with Beloit. After posting a 4.07 ERA across 20 starts, Fulton was promoted to the Double-A Pensacola Blue Wahoos in August. In four games for Pensacola, he registered a 2.57 ERA with 30 strikeouts in 21 innings of work.

Fulton returned to Pensacola to begin the 2023 season, making 7 appearances (6 starts) and logging a 2–4 record and 5.18 ERA with 39 strikeouts in 33 innings pitched. On June 13, 2023, it was announced that Fulton would undergo season-ending surgery to repair the ulnar collateral ligament in his left elbow.

Fulton did not appear for the organization in 2024 as he continued to rehab from injury. Following the season, the Marlins added Fulton to their 40-man roster to protect him from the Rule 5 draft. Fulton was optioned to Double-A Pensacola to begin the 2025 season. He made 23 appearances (22 starts) split between Pensacola and the Triple-A Jacksonville Jumbo Shrimp, accumulating a 5–11 record and 5.38 ERA with 115 strikeouts across 103 2/3 innings pitched.

Fulton was optioned to Triple-A Jacksonville to begin the 2026 season. On May 6, 2026, Fulton was promoted to the major leagues for the first time. Fulton made his MLB debut later that day, appearing in relief and pitching four innings while allowing two runs and recording three strikeouts.
