= Craig Driver =

American baseball coach (born 1988)

Miami Marlins – No. 81
- Coach
- Born: September 21, 1988 (age 37); Seattle, Washington, U.S.
- Bats: Right Throws: Right

Teams
- As coach: Philadelphia Phillies (2018–2019); Chicago Cubs (2020–2023); Miami Marlins (2026–present)

Craig Driver (born September 21, 1988) is an American professional baseball coach who currently serves as the first base coach for the Miami Marlins of Major League Baseball (MLB).

== Career ==
Driver attended Nathan Hale High School in Seattle, Washington, where he played baseball and basketball for the Raiders. Driver played four years of college baseball as a catcher; first at Columbia Basin College for one year, and then at the University of Puget Sound for his final three years.

Driver began his coaching career at the University of Puget Sound, serving as a catching coach, first base coach, and recruiter for the 2011–2012 season. Driver spent the 2012–2013 and 2013–2014 seasons at Central Washington University as a graduate assistant coach. He returned to Puget Sound for the 2014–2015 and 2015–2016 seasons as the athletic recruitment coordinator and head assistant coach. Driver then spent the 2016–2017 season at Yale University, serving as their catching coach.

Driver began his professional coaching career with the Philadelphia Phillies, serving as their bullpen catcher and receiving coach in 2018 and 2019.

Driver was hired by the Chicago Cubs as their first base and catching coach prior to the 2020 season.

Driver spent the 2024 and 2025 seasons in the Los Angeles Dodgers organization as a catching and bullpen coach.

On November 19, 2025, the Miami Marlins hired Driver to serve as the team's first base coach.

== Personal life ==
Driver graduated from the University of Puget Sound with a degree in business and a minor in mathematics, and completed a master's degree in athletic administration at Central Washington University.
