= Sandy Alcántara =

Dominican baseball player (born 1995)

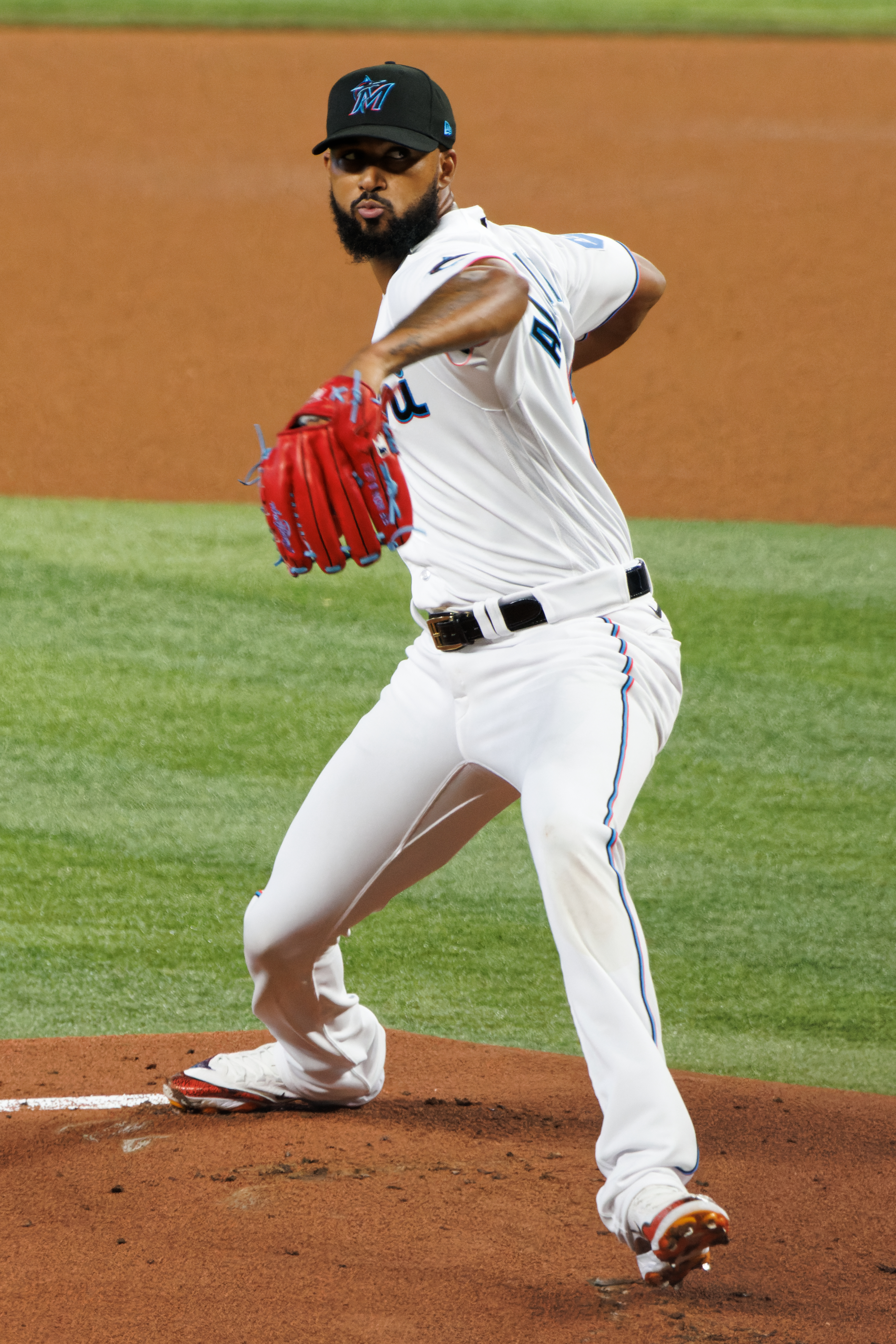
- Alcántara with the Miami Marlins in 2023

Miami Marlins – No. 22
- Pitcher
- Born: September 7, 1995 (age 31); Azua, Dominican Republic
- Bats: Right Throws: Right

MLB debut
- September 3, 2017, for the St. Louis Cardinals

MLB statistics (through 2026 season)
- Win–loss record: 65–78
- Earned run average: 3.69
- Strikeouts: 1,084
- Stats at Baseball Reference

Teams
- St. Louis Cardinals (2017); Miami Marlins (2018–2023, 2025–present)

Career highlights and awards
- 2× All-Star (2019, 2022); NL Cy Young Award (2022); All-MLB First Team (2022)
Medals
Men's baseball
Representing Dominican Republic
World Baseball Classic
Bronze medal – third place	2026 Miami	Team

Sandy Alcántara Montero (born September 7, 1995) is a Dominican professional baseball pitcher for the Miami Marlins of Major League Baseball (MLB). He has previously played in MLB for the St. Louis Cardinals.

Alcántara signed with the Cardinals as an international free agent in 2013, and made his MLB debut with them in 2017. The Cardinals traded Alcántara to the Marlins after the 2017 season. He was an All-Star in 2019 and 2022, and won the National League Cy Young Award in 2022.

== Early life ==
Alcántara was born in San Juan de la Maguana in the Dominican Republic. He is one of 11 children. When he was 11 years old, his parents sent him to live with an older sister in the capital, Santo Domingo, where he could both study for school and attend baseball practice. He dropped out of school in eighth grade to concentrate on a baseball career.

== Career ==
=== St. Louis Cardinals ===
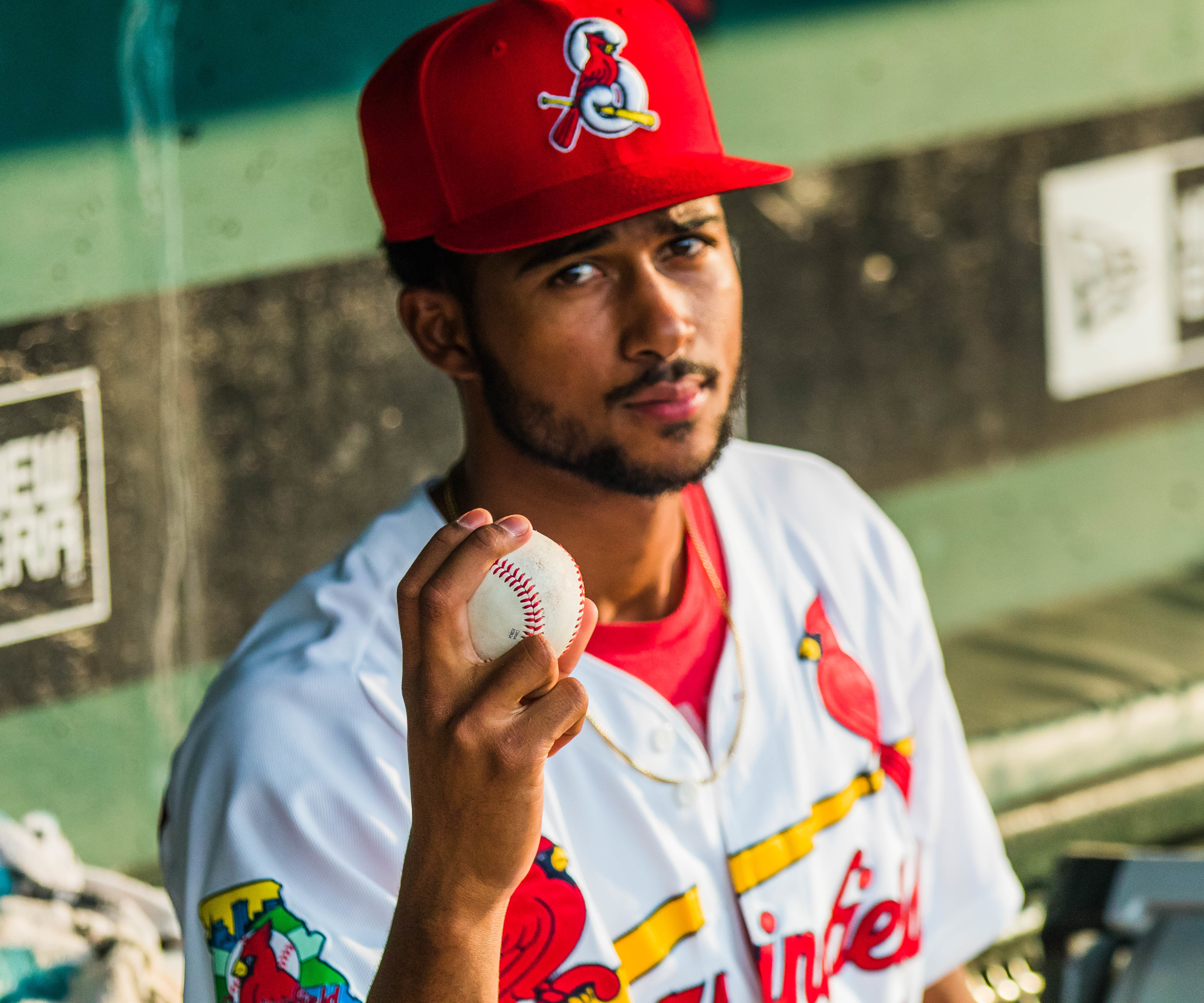
Alcántara with the Springfield Cardinals in 2017

In July 2013, at age 17, Alcántara signed with the St. Louis Cardinals as an international free agent. He made his professional debut in 2014 with the Dominican Summer League Cardinals and spent the whole season there, going 1–9 with a 3.97 ERA in 12 games (11 starts). He spent 2015 with the Gulf Coast Cardinals where he pitched to a 4–4 record and 3.22 ERA in 12 games started, and started 2016 with the Peoria Chiefs. During a start in May he tied the Chiefs record with 14 strikeouts. He was promoted to the Palm Beach Cardinals in July 2016. He finished the 2016 season with a combined 5–11 record with a 3.96 ERA in 23 games started between both clubs.

Alcántara began 2017 with the Springfield Cardinals. After pitching to a 7–5 record and 4.31 ERA while 4th in the league in walks and leading it with 20 wild pitches in a career high 125.1 innings, the Cardinals promoted him to the major leagues on September 1, 2017. After the season, the Cardinals assigned Alcántara to the Surprise Saguaros of the Arizona Fall League (AFL), where he was selected to the Fall Stars Game. He pitched 15 total innings in the AFL, finishing the season with five games started, a 1–2 record, and a 4.20 ERA.

=== Miami Marlins ===
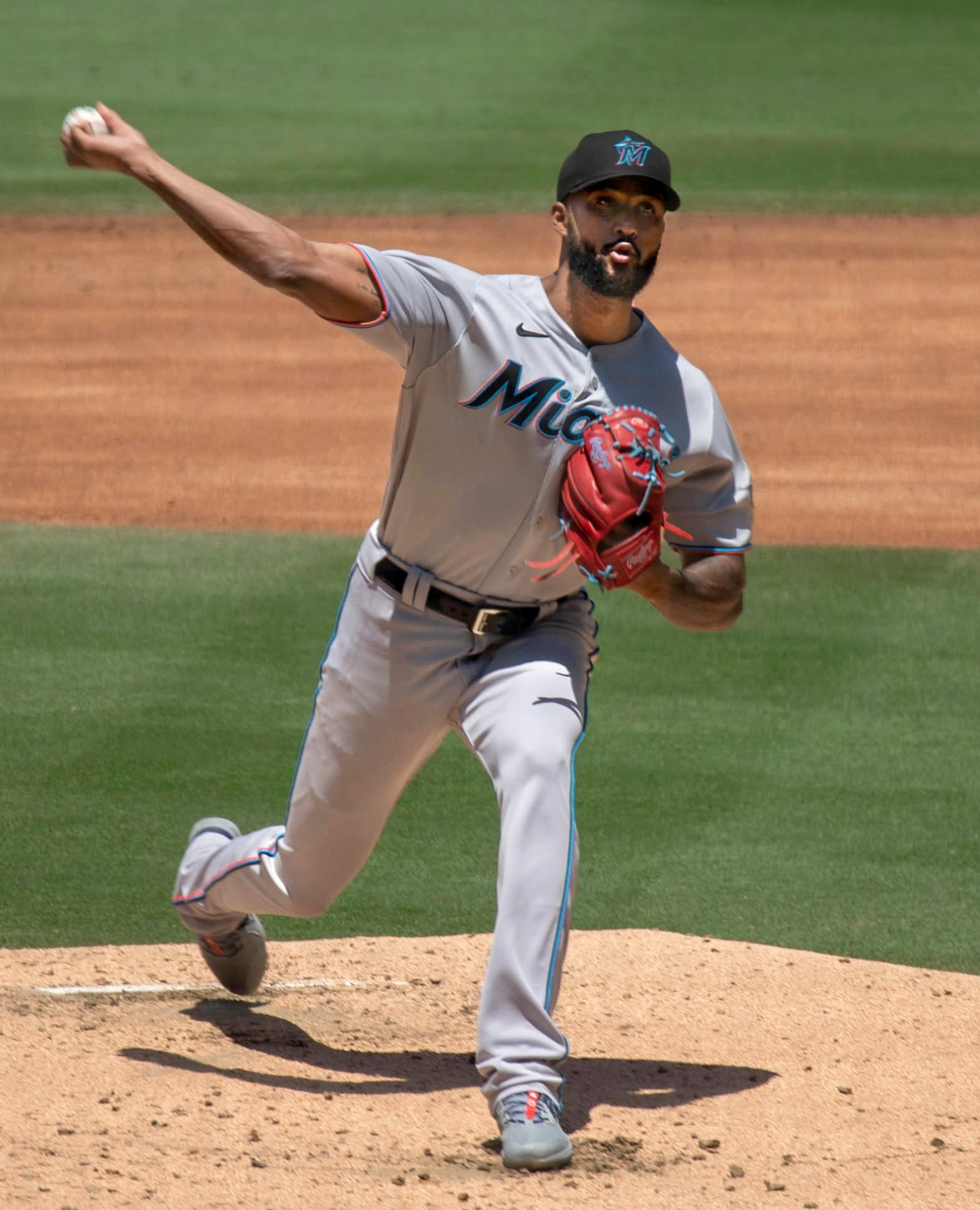
Alcántara with the Marlins in 2021

On December 14, 2017, the Cardinals traded Alcántara, along with Magneuris Sierra, Zac Gallen, and Daniel Castano to the Miami Marlins for Marcell Ozuna. MLB.com ranked Alcántara as Miami's third-best prospect going into the 2018 season. He began 2018 with the New Orleans Baby Cakes, and was recalled by Miami on June 28. He made his Marlins debut on June 29 as the starting pitcher, pitching five innings in which he gave up one run on three hits and five walks while striking out two, earning the win as Miami defeated the New York Mets 8–2. He was placed on the 10-day disabled list on with a right axillary infection. On May 19, 2019, Alcántara pitched his first career shutout, an 89-pitch two-hit Maddux against the New York Mets.

Alcántara was the sole Miami Marlins player named to the 2019 Major League Baseball All-Star Game. Pitching the eighth inning, he retired the side. He finished the season with a 6–14 record and a 3.88 ERA over 197 1/3 innings in 32 starts, leading the National League in losses and shutouts.

In the shortened 2020 season, Alcántara was 3–2 with a 3.00 ERA in 42 innings.

Alcántara owns Marlins franchise records of most innings pitched by a rookie, and most innings pitched and strikeouts by a Dominican-born player. On November 28, 2021, the Marlins signed Alcántara to a contract extension worth $56 million, breaking the record for the largest contract for a pitcher under team control with less than four years service time set by Carlos Martinez.

=== 2022 season: Cy Young campaign ===
In 2022, he was 14–9 with a 2.28 ERA in 32 starts covering 228.2 innings. With a bWAR of 8.0, Alcántara led the National League, and led all pitchers across both leagues. He unanimously won the 2022 NL Cy Young Award, over second-place pitcher Max Fried.

=== 2023–2025 seasons: Ups and downs, Tommy John surgery ===
Alcántara regressed from his Cy Young campaign in 2023, making 28 starts and posting a 7–12 record and 4.14 ERA with 151 strikeouts in 184 2/3 innings pitched. On September 4, 2023, he was placed on the injured list with a right forearm flexor strain. An MRI later revealed a sprain of Alcantara's ulnar collateral ligament, putting his season in jeopardy. He began a rehab assignment with the Triple–A Jacksonville Jumbo Shrimp, but was shut down for the remainder of the season on September 23 after experiencing forearm tightness. On October 6, Alcántara underwent Tommy John surgery to repair the UCL in his right elbow, ruling him out for the 2024 season.

Returning from injury in 2025, Alcántara had an up-and-down season. In the first half, Alcántara struggled mightily, slumping to a 2–7 record by the end of May. After three straight starts allowing 5 or more earned runs in July, Alcántara sat at a 7.14 ERA, the highest of any starter in MLB up to that point in the season. However, from this point on, Alcántara settled down, and recorded numerous solid outings, including 3 straight 7-inning starts from August 20 against the St. Louis Cardinals, to August 31, against the New York Mets, logging two wins in this span. A 3–1 record in September lifted Alcántara to a final 11–12 record, and a 5.36 ERA. Following his final start of the season, an emotional Alcántara reflected upon his season and leadership role within the Marlins clubhouse, explaining after the game that he was "just trying to take every special moment that I had with my teammates". A subject of trade talks throughout the season, Alcántara ultimately remained with the team for the 2026 season.

=== 2026 season: Marlins strikeout leader ===
In 2026, Alcántara was selected for his franchise record sixth Opening Day start for the Marlins, where he pitched seven shutout innings with five strikeouts against the Colorado Rockies, earning the win. He followed this up with a complete–game shutout against the Chicago White Sox on April 1, striking out seven, and allowing just three hits in a 10–0 romp.

Despite some difficult outings against the Detroit Tigers in mid-April, and two back-to-back blowouts against the Atlanta Braves and Toronto Blue Jays in late May (all three of which ended in losses), Alcántara settled down in June, winning five consecutive decisions to begin the month, improving to 8–4 on the year and a 4.01 ERA. His 6 2/3 inning, 4 strikeout effort against the Texas Rangers on June 23 was a historic one, as his 7th inning strikeout of Kyle Higashioka set the new Marlins club record for strikeouts with 1,002, surpassing Ricky Nolasco's 1,001. Additionally, his 30th career win at LoanDepot Park also set a new Marlins record for most wins at the stadium. On September 16 against the Arizona Diamondbacks, Alcántara notched his first career save, coming into the 9th to preserve a 4–3 victory, as the Marlins' bullpen was depleted from the previous game. As such, he became the first pitcher to record a save while leading the league in innings pitched since Orel Hershiser in 1987. Overall in 2026, Alcántara pitched an MLB-leading 214 innings. However, he allowed 204 hits, which also led MLB, tied with Cristopher Sánchez. Alcántara's other stats for 2026 included a 13–11 record and a 3.87 ERA in 36 appearances (33 starts).

== Pitching style ==
Alcántara's fastball velocity generally sits around 97 mph, maxing out around 101 mph. He uses both a four-seam fastball and a sinker, which possess above-average vertical and horizontal movement. His secondary pitches are the changeup (90-94 mph average velocity), slider (89-93 mph) and curveball (82 mph), although his use of the curveball is scarce.

== Philanthropy ==
In partnership with The Giving Much More (GMM) Foundation, and The Baseball Club. Alcántara hosted multiple fundraising events in 2019 to collect baseball equipment for underprivileged youth in his native Dominican Republic. This included the first annual "Softball with the Sandman" Charity Baseball Tournament on his 24th birthday.

After completing his 2019 season, Alcántara traveled to the Dominican Republic to deliver the equipment directly to the children.

== See also ==
- List of baseball players who underwent Tommy John surgery
