= Robby Snelling =

American baseball player (born 2003)

Miami Marlins – No. 61
- Pitcher
- Born: December 19, 2003 (age 22); Reno, Nevada, U.S.
- Bats: Right Throws: Left

MLB debut
- May 8, 2026, for the Miami Marlins

MLB statistics (through 2026 season)
- Win–loss record: 0–1
- Earned run average: 5.40
- Strikeouts: 2
- Stats at Baseball Reference

Teams
- Miami Marlins (2026–present)

Robert Matthew Snelling (born December 19, 2003) is an American professional baseball pitcher for the Miami Marlins of Major League Baseball (MLB). He made his MLB debut in 2026.

== Amateur career ==
Snelling attended Robert McQueen High School in Reno, Nevada, where he played on both the baseball team as a pitcher and on the football team as a linebacker and quarterback, the latter of which his father was head coach of. During the summer of 2021, he participated in the High School All-American Game as well as in the All-Star High School Home Run Derby at Coors Field where he hit 21 home runs. He was named Region Player of the Year following his senior football season. As a senior for the baseball team in 2022, he struck out 145 batters while also batting .450. He broke the state record for strikeouts in a game with twenty in a seven-inning game. He also set a new state single-season record for strikeouts. He finished the season 8-0 with a 0.56 ERA and 145 strikeouts alongside batting .362 with six home runs, and was named the Gatorade Nevada Baseball Player of the Year. Following the season's end, he traveled to San Diego where he participated in the Draft Combine.

Snelling originally committed to play college baseball for the Stanford Cardinal at the end of his freshman year of high school, but decommitted during his junior year after he began also getting recruited for football. He then committed to play both baseball and football for the Arizona Wildcats, but decommitted when baseball coach Jay Johnson left to coach the LSU Tigers. Snelling then committed to LSU to play baseball.

== Professional career ==
=== San Diego Padres ===
The San Diego Padres drafted Snelling with the 39th overall selection of the 2022 Major League Baseball draft. He signed with the team for $3 million.

To begin the 2023 season, Snelling was assigned to the Lake Elsinore Storm of the Single-A California League. In late June, he was promoted to the Fort Wayne TinCaps of the High-A Midwest League. In mid-August, he was promoted to the San Antonio Missions of the Double-A Texas League. Over 22 starts between the three teams, Snelling went 11-3 with a 1.82 ERA and 118 strikeouts over 103 2/3 innings. Snelling was assigned back to San Antonio to open the 2024 season. Snelling was selected to represent the Padres (alongside Ethan Salas) in the All-Star Futures Game at Globe Life Field.

=== Miami Marlins ===
On July 30, 2024, the Padres traded Snelling, Graham Pauley, Adam Mazur, and Jay Beshears to the Miami Marlins in exchange for Bryan Hoeing and Tanner Scott. The Marlins assigned him to the Pensacola Blue Wahoos and he also pitched in one game for the Jacksonville Jumbo Shrimp at the season's end. Over 24 total starts for the 2024 season, Snelling went 4-10 with a 5.15 ERA and 115 strikeouts over 115 1/3 innings.

Snelling opened the 2025 season with Pensacola and was promoted to Jacksonville in July. Over 25 starts between the two teams, Snelling went 9-7 with a 2.51 ERA and 166 strikeouts over 136 innings. The Marlins named him their Minor League Pitcher of the Year. Snelling returned to Jacksonville to open the 2026 season and pitched to a 1.86 ERA and 44 strikeouts across 29 innings.

On May 8, 2026, Snelling was selected to the 40-man roster and promoted to the major leagues for the first time. He made his MLB debut that night at LoanDepot Park as Miami's starting pitcher versus the Washington Nationals. Snelling pitched five innings and gave up three earned runs (all in the first inning) across five hits and four walks while recording two strikeouts, the first of his career being against James Wood in the first inning. On May 13, the Marlins placed Snelling on the injured list with a left elbow UCL strain. On May 21, it was announced he would undergo Tommy John surgery, ending his season.
