= Max Meyer (baseball) =

American baseball player (born 1999)

Miami Marlins – No. 23
- Pitcher
- Born: March 12, 1999 (age 27); Woodbury, Minnesota, U.S.
- Bats: Left Throws: Right

MLB debut
- July 16, 2022, for the Miami Marlins

MLB statistics (through 2026 season)
- Win–loss record: 15–12
- Earned run average: 4.07
- Strikeouts: 241
- Stats at Baseball Reference

Teams
- Miami Marlins (2022, 2024–present)

Career highlights and awards
- All-Star (2026)

Maxwell Thomas Meyer (born March 12, 1999) is an American professional baseball pitcher for the Miami Marlins of Major League Baseball (MLB). He was selected third overall by the Marlins in the 2020 MLB draft, and made his MLB debut in 2022. Meyer was named to his first All-Star game in 2026.

== Amateur career ==
Meyer grew up in Woodbury, Minnesota and attended Woodbury High School where he played baseball and hockey. He committed to play college baseball at the University of Minnesota during his junior year. As a senior, Meyer had a 7–1 win–loss record with a 1.01 earned run average (ERA) and 51 strikeouts in 41 2/3 innings pitched while batting .421. He was named All-Metro by the Star Tribune. Meyer was drafted in the 34th round of the 2017 Major League Baseball draft by the Minnesota Twins, but did not sign.

Meyer enrolled at the University of Minnesota to play college baseball for the Minnesota Golden Gophers. He served as the Gophers' closer as a true freshman, finishing the season tied for the school record for saves in a season with 16 and a 2.06 ERA with 54 strikeouts in 43 2/3 innings pitched. He was named a Freshman All-American by the National Collegiate Baseball Writers Association (NCBWA) and by Perfect Game as well as a third team All-American by the American Baseball Coaches Association (ABCA) and the Collegiate Baseball Newspaper. During the summer, Meyer played for the Team USA Collegiate National Baseball Team, serving as the team's closer leading the team with seven saves. As a sophomore, Meyer went 5–3 with two saves and posted a 2.11 ERA and 87 strikeouts while also increasing his playing time in the outfield and batted .256 and was named second team All-Big Ten Conference and a semifinalist for the John Olerud Award. He returned to the US Collegiate National Team after the season and posted a team-best 0.64 ERA with 12 strikeouts in four appearances (three starts).

Going into his junior season, Meyer was named a preseason All-American by four different outlets, placed on the watch list for the Golden Spikes Award and was a top prospect for the 2020 Major League Baseball draft. He went 3–1 with a 1.95 ERA, 0.83 walks plus hits per inning pitched (WHIP) ratio and 46 strikeouts in 27 2/3 innings pitched before the season was cut short due to the coronavirus pandemic.

== Professional career ==
=== Miami Marlins (2022–present) ===
The Miami Marlins selected Meyer in the first round, with the third overall selection, in the 2020 Major League Baseball draft. He signed with the Marlins for a $6.7 million signing bonus. Meyer did not play in a game in 2020 due to the cancellation of the minor league season because of the COVID-19 pandemic.

Meyer made his professional debut in 2021 with the Pensacola Blue Wahoos of the Double-A South and was promoted to the Jacksonville Jumbo Shrimp of the Triple-A East in September. Over 22 starts between the two clubs, Meyer pitched to a 6–4 record, a 2.27 ERA, and 130 strikeouts over 111 innings. Meyer was selected to play in the 2021 All-Star Futures Game. He opened the 2022 season back with Jacksonville.

On July 16, 2022, Meyer had his contract selected to the 40-man roster and was promoted to the major leagues for the first time. In his second MLB start against the Pittsburgh Pirates on July 23, he left the game with elbow discomfort. On August 9, Meyer underwent Tommy John surgery, with a recovery timetable causing him to miss the remainder of the 2022 season and the entire 2023 season.

Meyer was initially optioned to Triple–A Jacksonville to begin the 2024 season. However, the Marlins later reversed course and included Meyer on their Opening Day roster. He made 11 starts for Miami during the regular season, compiling a 3-5 record and 5.68 ERA with 46 strikeouts over 57 innings of work.

On April 21, 2025, Meyer recorded a career-high 14 strikeouts in a 6-3 victory over the Cincinnati Reds. In 12 starts for Miami, he compiled a 3-5 record and 4.73 ERA with 68 strikeouts across 64 2/3 innings pitched. On June 24, it was announced that Meyer would undergo season-ending surgery to repair a labrum tear in his left hip.

==== 2026 ====
Returning from his injury for the 2026 season, Meyer had a strong start to his campaign. Across his first 11 starts with the Marlins, Meyer compiled a spotless 5–0 record, a 2.52 ERA, and 68 strikeouts in 60 2/3 innings pitched. Notably, he pitched seven scoreless innings of one hit baseball with seven strikeouts in a 4–0 win against the Philadelphia Phillies on May 2, and another seven inning shutout effort against the New York Mets on May 23, collecting eight strikeouts and only allowing one hit; a soft grounder from Mark Vientos in the second inning. As such, he became the last qualified starter in the league without a loss. Following another 7–inning, one run effort and a win against the Washington Nationals on June 3, Meyer broke Liván Hernández's 1997 mark of 13 starts to begin a season without a loss, improving to 6–0 in the process.

Thru his next four starts, Meyer compiled three more wins against the Pittsburgh Pirates (six innings, nine strikeouts, one earned run), San Francisco Giants (five innings, seven strikeouts, two earned runs), and St. Louis Cardinals (seven shutout innings, five strikeouts), lowering his season ERA back to 2.60. With his 9–0 record, he matched Liván Hernández for the club record for the most wins to start a season before a loss. He was named to the 2026 Major League Baseball All-Star Game, his first All-Star selection. On July 20, Meyer was placed on the injured list with a neck strain, and the Marlins later announced he would not pitch again in 2026. Meyer ended his 2026 season having started 20 games while compiling a 9–1 record, a 2.68 ERA, and 121 strikeouts over 111 innings pitched.
