= Jack Ralston =

American baseball player (born 1997)

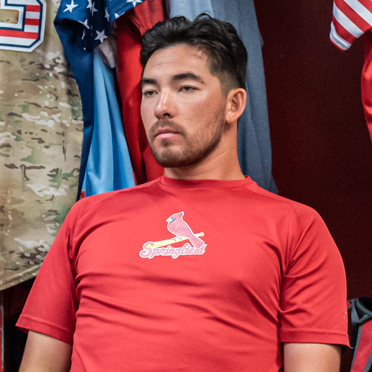
- Ralston with the Springfield Cardinals in 2023

Miami Marlins – No. 79
- Pitcher
- Born: August 13, 1997 (age 29); Panorama City, California, U.S.
- Bats: Right Throws: Right

MLB debut
- August 23, 2026, for the Miami Marlins

MLB statistics (through 2026 season)
- Win–loss record: 0–3
- Earned run average: 5.71
- Strikeouts: 19
- Stats at Baseball Reference

Teams
- Miami Marlins (2026–present)

Jack William Ralston (born August 13, 1997) is an American professional baseball pitcher for the Miami Marlins of Major League Baseball (MLB). He made his MLB debut in 2026.

== Amateur career ==
Ralston attended William S. Hart High School in Newhall, California, where he played baseball and had a 1.16 earned run average (ERA) as a junior in 2014 and a 2.06 ERA with 72 strikeouts as a senior in 2015.

During the summer of 2015, Ralston played for the La Crosse Loggers of the Northwoods League. He was redshirted as a freshman at the University of California, Los Angeles (UCLA) in 2016, and then returned to the Loggers that summer. He also did not appear in a game for UCLA in 2017, although he did once again play collegiate summer baseball that summer, this time with the Chico Heat of the Great West League. Ralston made his first appearance with UCLA in 2018. He pitched in 14 games (nine starts) and had a 1–4 win-loss record, a 6.44 ERA, and 18 strikeouts across 36 1/3 innings pitched. During the summer of 2018, he played in the Cape Cod Baseball League with the Wareham Gatemen. With UCLA in 2019, Ralston had an 11–1 record with a 2.66 ERA across 17 starts.

== Professional career ==
=== St. Louis Cardinals ===
Ralston was selected by the St. Louis Cardinals in the seventh round of the 2019 Major League Baseball draft. He made his professional debut with the Class A Short Season State College Spikes and had a 1.07 ERA across 17 relief appearances. He spent the next six years in the Cardinals system playing in the minor leagues, including spending parts of the 2023, 2024, and 2025 seasons with the Double-A Springfield Cardinals. In 2025, he also made his Triple-A debut with the Memphis Redbirds. He elected free agency after the 2025 season.

=== Miami Marlins ===
On December 16, 2025, Ralston signed a minor league contract with the Miami Marlins and was then assigned to the Triple-A Jacksonville Jumbo Shrimp to begin the 2026 season. Across 39 appearances for Jacksonville, Ralston had a 6–2 record, a 1.66 ERA and 75 strikeouts across 59 2/3 innings. On August 4, 2026, the Marlins added Ralston to their 40-man roster and optioned him back to Jacksonville. On August 23, Ralston was promoted to the major leagues for the first time. He made his MLB debut that day against the Washington Nationals and pitched two scoreless innings in relief while recording two strikeouts with the first of his MLB career being of Nasim Nuñez. Ralston played the remainder of the season with the Marlins and ended with a 0–3 record, a 5.71 ERA, and 19 strikeouts across 17 1/3 innings pitched out of the bullpen.
