= Tyler Phillips =

American baseball player (born 1997)

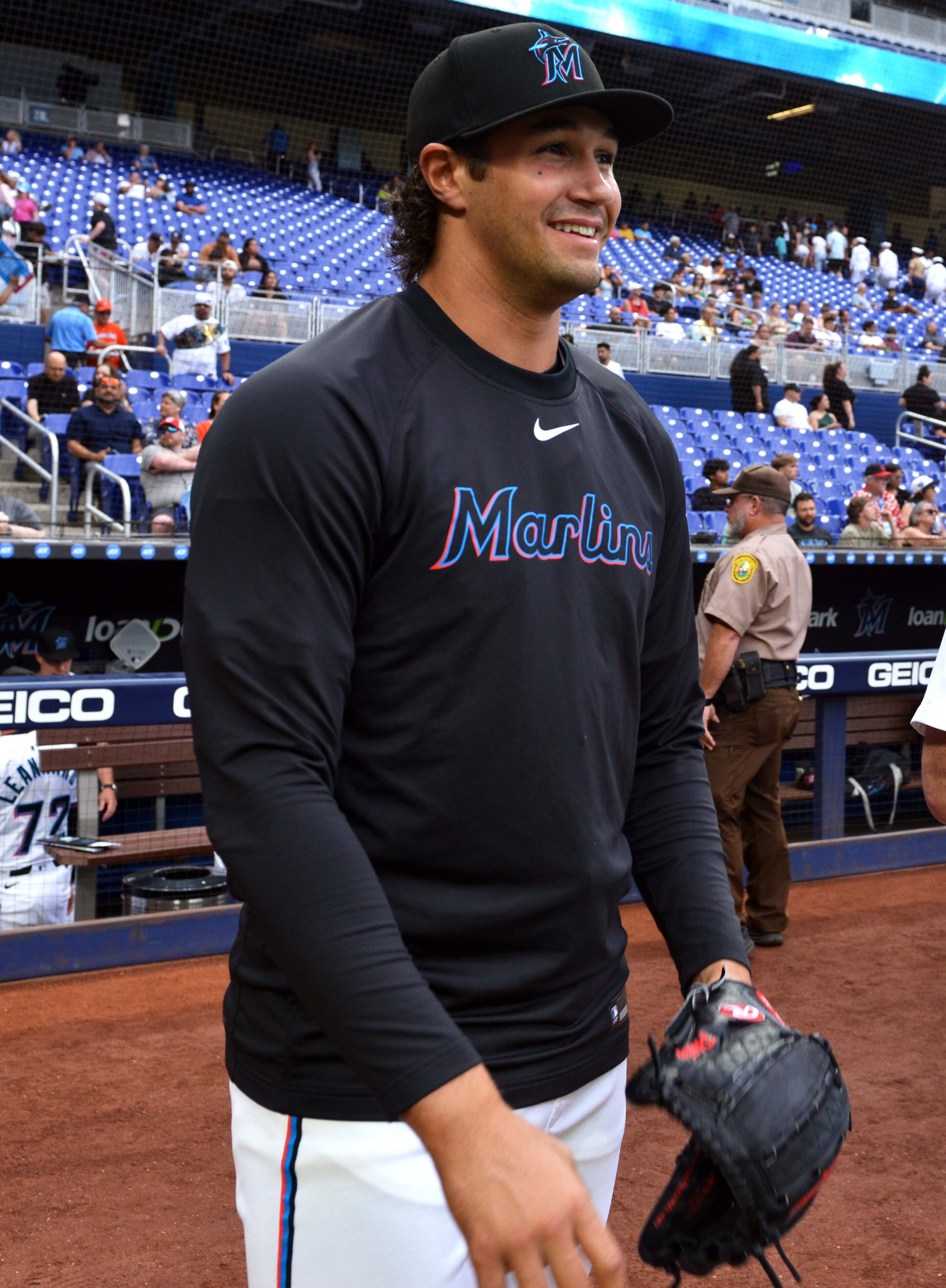
- Phillips with the Miami Marlins in 2025

Miami Marlins – No. 30
- Pitcher
- Born: October 27, 1997 (age 28); Lumberton, New Jersey, U.S.
- Bats: Right Throws: Right

MLB debut
- July 7, 2024, for the Philadelphia Phillies

MLB statistics (through 2026 season)
- Win–loss record: 11–8
- Earned run average: 3.70
- Strikeouts: 181
- Stats at Baseball Reference

Teams
- Philadelphia Phillies (2024); Miami Marlins (2025–present)

Tyler Nicholas Phillips (born October 27, 1997) is an American professional baseball pitcher for the Miami Marlins of Major League Baseball (MLB). He has previously played in MLB for the Philadelphia Phillies. He made his MLB debut in 2024.

== Career ==
=== Amateur career ===
Phillips attended Bishop Eustace Preparatory School in Pennsauken Township, New Jersey. He was drafted by the Texas Rangers in the 16th round of the 2015 MLB draft. He signed with them for a $160,000 signing bonus, forgoing a commitment to State College of Florida, Manatee–Sarasota.

=== Texas Rangers ===
After signing, Phillips was assigned to the AZL Rangers of the Rookie-level Arizona League to make his professional debut; in 15 innings pitched for them, he posted a 0–1 record with a 3.60 ERA. In 2016, he made 13 starts for Spokane Indians of the Low–A Northwest League, going 4–7 with a 6.44 ERA, while striking out 57 in 58 2/3 innings. He split 2017 between Spokane and Hickory Crawdads of the Single–A South Atlantic League, going a combined 5–4 with a 4.21 ERA in 20 games (17 starts). In 2018 he went 11–5 with a 2.67 ERA with the Hickory, striking out 124 in 128 innings. He earned a spot on the South Atlantic League mid-season all-star team. Phillips finished the season with the Down East Wood Ducks of the High–A Carolina League, going 1–0 with a 1.80 ERA. Phillips was the recipient of the 2018 Texas Rangers Nolan Ryan Pitcher of the Year award.

Prior to the 2019 season, Phillips was rated by Baseball America as having the best control tool in minor league baseball. Phillips was assigned back to Down East to open the 2019 season, and went 2–2 with a 1.19 ERA in 37 2/3 innings for them. On May 10, he was promoted to the Frisco RoughRiders of the Double-A Texas League. With Frisco, Phillips went 7–9 with a 4.73 ERA over 93 1/3 innings.

On November 20, 2019, the Rangers added Phillips to their 40-man roster to protect him from the Rule 5 draft. Phillips did not play in a game in 2020 due to the cancellation of the Minor League Baseball season because of the COVID-19 pandemic. He opened the 2021 season back with Frisco. Phillips was designated for assignment on July 17, 2021, after struggling to a 1–5 record and 6.75 ERA in 10 games between Frisco and the Triple-A Round Rock Express.

=== Philadelphia Phillies ===
On July 24, 2021, the Philadelphia Phillies claimed Phillips off waivers, and assigned him to the Double–A Reading Fightin Phils. He was placed on the injured list on September 13 due to a right elbow impingement suffered while he was with the High–A Jersey Shore Blue Claws, ending his season. Phillips was designated for assignment by Philadelphia on September 20. He was released by Philadelphia the following day. On November 6, Phillips re-signed with the Phillies on a minor league contract. Phillips missed the entire 2022 season after undergoing surgery to resolve the impingement he had suffered late in the 2021 season. For the start of the 2023 season, Phillips was assigned to Reading, before being promoted to the Triple–A Lehigh Valley Iron Pigs on July 26. In total, he finished with a 4.92 ERA over 122 2/3 innings across 26 outings.

Phillips began the 2024 campaign with Triple–A Lehigh Valley, compiling a 7–3 record and 4.89 ERA with 78 strikeouts across 15 starts. On July 5, 2024, Phillips was selected to the 40–man roster and promoted to the major leagues for the first time. Phillips made his debut two days later. In his debut, Phillips tossed four innings of relief, striking out seven batters and allowing one run in a 6–0 loss to the Atlanta Braves. Due to injuries to starters Taijuan Walker and Spencer Turnbull, Phillips was added to the starting rotation. He made his first career start on July 13, against the Oakland Athletics, allowing four runs and striking out four over six innings, and earned his first career win in an 11–5 Phillies victory. On July 27, Phillips pitched a complete game shutout in an 8–0 victory over the Cleveland Guardians, becoming the first Phillies rookie to throw a complete game shutout since Zach Eflin in 2016. On September 3, two days after being called up from Triple-A and named the Phillies' new no. 5 starter, Phillips surrendered six runs on eight hits in only 2/3 innings of work against the Toronto Blue Jays; despite this, the Phillies came back to win the game, 10–9. Phillips made 8 appearances (7 starts) for Philadelphia during his rookie campaign, posting a 4-1 record and 6.87 ERA with 28 strikeouts across 36 2/3 innings pitched.

On March 23, 2025, Phillips was designated for assignment following the acquisition of Carlos Hernández.

=== Miami Marlins ===
On March 26, 2025, Phillips was traded to the Miami Marlins in exchange for cash considerations.

== Personal life ==
Phillips has one son, Frank. He grew up a fan of the Philadelphia Phillies.
