= William Kempner =

American baseball player (born 2001)

Miami Marlins – No. 71
- Pitcher
- Born: June 18, 2001 (age 25); San Jose, California, U.S.
- Bats: Right Throws: Right

MLB debut
- May 5, 2026, for the Miami Marlins

MLB statistics (through 2026 season)
- Win–loss record: 1–0
- Earned run average: 2.92
- Strikeouts: 14
- Stats at Baseball Reference

Teams
- Miami Marlins (2026–present)

William McCullough Kempner (born June 18, 2001) is an American professional baseball pitcher for the Miami Marlins of Major League Baseball (MLB). He made his MLB debut in 2026.

== Career ==
Kempner attended Valley Christian High School in San Jose, California, where he played for the school's baseball team. He enrolled at Gonzaga University and played college baseball for the Gonzaga Bulldogs. He was selected by the San Francisco Giants in the third round of the 2022 Major League Baseball draft.

On January 15, 2025, the Giants traded Kempner to the Miami Marlins in exchange for international pool money. He made 48 appearances split between the High-A Beloit Sky Carp, Double-A Pensacola Blue Wahoos, and Triple-A Jacksonville Jumbo Shrimp, accumulating a 7–3 record with seven saves, a 2.26 earned run average, and 95 strikeouts across 67 2/3 innings pitched. On November 18, the Marlins added Kempner to their 40-man roster to protect him from the Rule 5 draft.

Kempner was optioned to Triple-A Jacksonville to begin the 2026 season. On May 5, he was promoted to the major leagues for the first time. That night, Kempner made his MLB debut in the eighth inning against the Baltimore Orioles, allowing no runs and recording one strikeout. On June 10, Kempner recorded his first career win, tossing two scoreless innings of relief against the Arizona Diamondbacks. He made nine appearances for Miami during his rookie campaign, recording a 2.92 ERA with 14 strikeouts across 12 1/3 innings pitched. On August 12, it was announced that Kempner would require elbow surgery that would sideline him 12–to–14 months.
