= Victor Vodnik =

Mexican and American baseball player (born 1999)

Miami Marlins – No. 38
- Pitcher
- Born: October 9, 1999 (age 27); Whittier, California, U.S.
- Bats: Right Throws: Right

MLB debut
- September 9, 2023, for the Colorado Rockies

MLB statistics (through 2026 season)
- Win–loss record: 13–10
- Earned run average: 4.32
- Strikeouts: 170
- Stats at Baseball Reference

Teams
- Colorado Rockies (2023–2026); Miami Marlins (2026–present)

Victor Francisco Vodnik (born October 9, 1999) is an American professional baseball pitcher for the Miami Marlins of Major League Baseball (MLB). He made his MLB debut in 2023 with the Colorado Rockies.

== Career ==
Vodnik grew up in Rialto, California and attended Rialto High School. He stopped playing football at the end of his sophomore year of high school, choosing to focus on baseball. As a senior, he had a 5–4 record with a 2.84 ERA and 85 strikeouts in 49 innings pitched.

=== Atlanta Braves ===
Vodnik was selected by the Atlanta Braves in the 14th round of the 2018 Major League Baseball draft, and joined the Braves organization for a signing bonus of $200,000. He was assigned to the Rookie League Gulf Coast League Braves after signing with the team. Vodnik spent the 2019 season with the Single–A Rome Braves and made 23 appearances with three starts, compiling a 1–3 record and three saves with a 2.94 ERA and 69 strikeouts over 67+^{1}/_{3} innings pitched. Vodnik did not play in a game in 2020 due to the cancellation of the minor league season because of the COVID-19 pandemic.

In 2021, Vodnik was assigned to the Mississippi Braves of the Double-A South, where he made 11 starts and had a 5.35 ERA and 41 strikeouts in 33+^{2}/_{3} innings pitched while missing time due to injury. After the minor league season ended Vodnik joined the Peoria Javelinas of the Arizona Fall League. After pitching for Mississippi in May 2022, Vodnik was promoted to the Triple–A Gwinnett Stripers later that month.

=== Colorado Rockies ===
On July 24, 2023, Vodnik, alongside Tanner Gordon, was traded to the Colorado Rockies in exchange for Pierce Johnson. He registered a 7.71 ERA across 8 appearances for the Triple–A Albuquerque Isotopes, as well as 4 scoreless appearances for the Double–A Hartford Yard Goats prior to his promotion. On September 8, Colorado selected Vodnik's contract to the 40-man roster and promoted him to the major leagues for the first time.

Vodnik started the 2024 season on the Rockies' Opening Day roster. He was placed on the 15-day injured list on August 21 with right bicep inflammation before returning on September 8. Prior to Injury, he pitched in 55 games, posting an ERA of 4.04 over 64 2/3 innings with 57 strikeouts to 31 walks.

Vodnik logged 52 appearances out of the bullpen for the Rockies during the 2025 campaign, compiling a 4–3 record and 3.02 ERA with 49 strikeouts and 10 saves across 50 2/3 innings pitched. Vodnik made 33 appearances for Colorado in 2026, accumulating a 3–3 record and 5.25 ERA with 26 strikeouts and four saves over 36 innings of work.

=== Miami Marlins ===
On August 3, 2026, the Rockies traded Vodnik to the Miami Marlins in exchange for Connor Norby and Aiden May.

== International career ==
Vodnik was called up to play for the Mexico national baseball team at the 2026 World Baseball Classic.
