= Michael Petersen (baseball) =

American baseball player (born 1994)

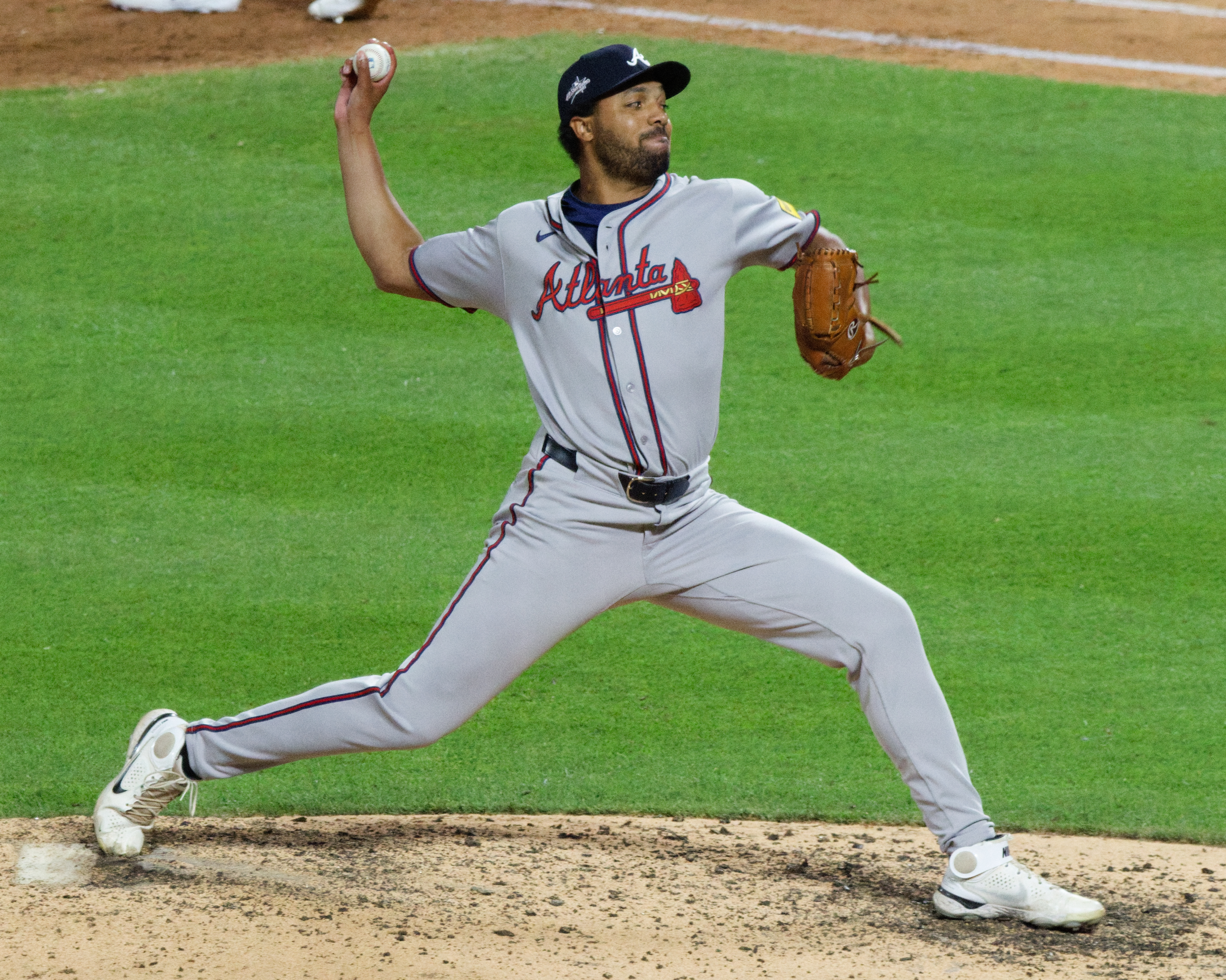
- Petersen with the Braves in 2025

Miami Marlins – No. 49
- Pitcher
- Born: May 16, 1994 (age 32); London, England
- Bats: Right Throws: Right

MLB debut
- June 18, 2024, for the Los Angeles Dodgers

MLB statistics (through 2026 season)
- Win–loss record: 7–5
- Earned run average: 3.75
- Strikeouts: 112
- Stats at Baseball Reference

Teams
- Los Angeles Dodgers (2024); Miami Marlins (2024); Atlanta Braves (2025); Miami Marlins (2025–present)

Michael Kenechukwu Petersen (born May 16, 1994) is a British-American professional baseball pitcher for the Miami Marlins of Major League Baseball (MLB). He has previously played in MLB for the Los Angeles Dodgers and Atlanta Braves. He made his MLB debut in 2024.

== Early life ==
Petersen was born in London to an American father and Nigerian mother. At age one, Petersen moved to California, his father's home state. Petersen grew up in San Jose and attended Saint Francis High School.

== Career ==
=== Amateur ===
Petersen was drafted by the Pittsburgh Pirates in the 19th round of the 2012 MLB draft out of Saint Francis High School but did not sign. He was later drafted by the Texas Rangers in the 31st round of the 2013 MLB draft out of West Valley College but also did not sign.

After one year at West Valley, Petersen transferred to Riverside City College, playing one game in the 2014 season, for 1 1/3 innings pitched, two strikeouts, and no runs allowed. He was again drafted, but did not sign, this time by the San Francisco Giants in the 24th round of the 2014 MLB draft.

=== Milwaukee Brewers ===
He was then drafted for a fourth time by the Milwaukee Brewers in the 17th round of the 2015 MLB draft, and this time he did sign, receiving a $100,000 bonus. Petersen began his professional career in 2015 with the Arizona League Brewers and then played for the Helena Brewers in 2016 and 2017. In 2018 with the Wisconsin Timber Rattlers, he made 32 appearances to a 3.72 earned run average (ERA) and in 2019 with the Carolina Mudcats he had a 3.17 ERA in 41 games.

=== Colorado Rockies ===
Petersen was claimed off waivers by the Colorado Rockies on December 12, 2019 He did not play in 2020 as a result of the cancellation of the minor league season because of the COVID-19 pandemic and missed the 2021 season after undergoing Tommy John surgery on May 5, 2021. While rehabbing from his injury, he made only one appearance in 2022 (in the Arizona Complex League) before splitting the 2023 season between the Double-A Hartford Yard Goats and Triple-A Albuquerque Isotopes, with a combined 41 games and 4.10 ERA.

=== Los Angeles Dodgers ===
Petersen signed a minor league contract with the Los Angeles Dodgers on January 24, 2024, and began the season with the Triple-A Oklahoma City Baseball Club. On June 16, Petersen was selected to the 40-man roster and promoted to the major leagues for the first time. He made his MLB debut two days later against the Rockies, allowing one run on one hit and one walk while striking out two in two innings to pick up the win. His first strikeout was of Elehuris Montero. He pitched 14 innings over 11 games for the Dodgers, with three wins, a 6.43 ERA, and 11 strikeouts. Petersen also appeared in 35 games for Oklahoma City, with a 1.64 ERA, 10 saves, and 44 strikeouts. He was designated for assignment by the Dodgers on September 8.

=== Miami Marlins ===
On September 10, 2024, Petersen was claimed off waivers by the Miami Marlins. In 5 appearances for the Marlins, Petersen logged a 4.76 ERA with 3 strikeouts across 5 2/3 innings pitched.

=== Los Angeles Angels ===
On November 4, 2024, Petersen was claimed off waivers by the Toronto Blue Jays. He was designated for assignment following the signing of Max Scherzer on February 4, 2025. On February 11, Petersen was claimed off waivers by the Los Angeles Angels. He was optioned to the Triple-A Salt Lake Bees to begin the season. Petersen made one appearance for Salt Lake before he was designated for assignment on March 31.

=== Atlanta Braves ===
On April 1, 2025, Petersen was traded to the Atlanta Braves in exchange for cash considerations. In four appearances for the Braves, he accumulated a 4.05 ERA with five strikeouts across 6 2/3 innings pitched. Petersen was designated for assignment by Atlanta on July 13.

=== Miami Marlins (second stint) ===
On July 16, 2025, Petersen was traded to the Miami Marlins in exchange for cash considerations.

== International career ==
Petersen pitched for Great Britain at the 2023 World Baseball Classic. He pitched one scoreless inning, striking out Nolan Arenado.
