= Ryan Gusto =

American baseball player (born 1999)

Miami Marlins – No. 65
- Pitcher
- Born: March 11, 1999 (age 27); Santa Rosa, California, U.S.
- Bats: Right Throws: Right

MLB debut
- March 31, 2025, for the Houston Astros

MLB statistics (through 2026 season)
- Win–loss record: 8–12
- Earned run average: 4.93
- Strikeouts: 171
- Stats at Baseball Reference

Teams
- Houston Astros (2025); Miami Marlins (2025–present)

Ryan Cole Gusto (born March 11, 1999) is an American professional baseball pitcher for the Miami Marlins of Major League Baseball (MLB). He has previously played in MLB for the Houston Astros. Gusto played college baseball at Florida SouthWestern State College, and was selected by the Astros in the 11th round of the 2019 MLB draft. He made his MLB debut in 2025 with the Astros.

== Career ==
=== Amateur career ===
Gusto attended Providence High School in Charlotte, North Carolina. He only played on his high school's baseball team for one year, playing instead for the homeschool baseball team, the Carolina Royals. He led a team of four Division I and 12 Division II collegiate baseball commitments to a 34-4 record his Junior season.

He received a walk-on offer to play college baseball at Broward College. After his freshman year, Gusto transferred to Florida SouthWestern State College.

=== Houston Astros ===
The Houston Astros selected Gusto in the 11th round, with the 346th overall selection, of the 2019 Major League Baseball draft. Gusto spent his first professional season split between the rookie–level Gulf Coast League Astros and Low–A Tri-City ValleyCats. He did not play in a game in 2020 due to the cancellation of the minor league season because of the COVID-19 pandemic. Gusto also missed the 2021 campaign after undergoing Tommy John surgery.

Gusto returned to action in 2022 with the Single–A Fayetteville Woodpeckers and High–A Asheville Tourists. In 23 games (13 starts) for the two affiliates, he compiled a 6–5 record and 5.50 ERA with 96 strikeouts across 90 innings pitched. Gusto made 26 appearances (14 starts) for Asheville and the Double–A Corpus Christi Hooks in 2023, registering a combined 7–4 record and 4.50 ERA with 115 strikeouts over 110 innings of work.

In 2024, Gusto pitched for the Sugar Land Space Cowboys of the Triple–A Pacific Coast League (PCL). He was named the PCL's Pitcher of the Month for July 2024. In 29 games (26 starts) for the Space Cowboys, he compiled an 8–6 record and 3.70 ERA with 141 strikeouts across 148 1/3 innings pitched. On September 29, 2024, the Astros selected Gusto to the 40-man roster and promoted him to the major leagues for the first time. However, Gusto was unable to make his debut after Houston's season finale was canceled due to rain, and he became a phantom ballplayer.

Gusto was initially optioned to Triple-A Sugar Land to begin the 2025 season. However, on March 24, 2025, he was informed that he had secured the final bullpen spot on Houston's Opening Day roster. On March 31, he made his major league debut versus the San Francisco Giants, entering in the seventh inning, and tossed two scoreless innings. Gusto retired Matt Chapman with a swinging strikeout for his first in the major leagues. He secured his first major league win on April 8 with a scoreless effort in the 11th in a 2–1, 12-inning win over the Seattle Mariners. Gusto made 24 appearances (14 starts) for Houston, compiling a 7-4 record and 4.92 ERA with 87 strikeouts over 86 innings of work.

=== Miami Marlins ===
On July 31, 2025, the Astros traded Gusto, Chase Jaworsky, and Esmil Valencia to the Miami Marlins in exchange for outfielder Jesús Sánchez. He made three starts down the stretch for Miami, but struggled to an 0-3 record and 9.77 ERA with 10 strikeouts across 15 2/3 innings pitched.

Gusto was optioned to the Triple-A Jacksonville Jumbo Shrimp to being the 2026 season.
