= Josh Ekness =

American baseball player (born 2002)

Miami Marlins – No. 95
- Pitcher
- Born: February 7, 2002 (age 24); Albuquerque, New Mexico, U.S.
- Bats: Right Throws: Right

MLB debut
- May 3, 2026, for the Miami Marlins

MLB statistics (through 2026 season)
- Win–loss record: 3–4
- Earned run average: 3.23
- Strikeouts: 24
- Stats at Baseball Reference

Teams
- Miami Marlins (2026–present)

Joshua Dean Ekness (born February 7, 2002) is an American professional baseball pitcher for the Miami Marlins of Major League Baseball (MLB). He made his MLB debut in 2026.

== Amateur career ==
Ekness attended The Woodlands High School in The Woodlands, Texas and played college baseball at Lamar University and the University of Houston. In 2021, he played collegiate summer baseball with the Bourne Braves of the Cape Cod Baseball League.

== Professional career ==
Ekness was selected by the Miami Marlins in the 12th round (353rd overall) of the 2023 Major League Baseball draft. Ekness spent his first professional season with the rookie-level Florida Complex League Marlins and Jupiter Hammerheads. He pitched 2024 with Jupiter, the Beloit Sky Carp, and Pensacola Blue Wahoos.

Ekness was assigned to the Triple-A Jacksonville Jumbo Shrimp to begin the 2026 campaign. On May 2, 2026, the Marlins promoted him to the major leagues for the first time. After recording a 1.69 ERA over six appearances, Ekness was placed on the injured list due to a right calf strain on June 1. He was transferred to the 60-day injured list on June 21. Ekness was activated from the injured list on August 3. On August 16, Ekness recorded his first career win after tossing a scoreless inning of relief against the Cincinnati Reds.
