= Miami Marlins all-time roster =

List of baseball players

The following is a list of players, both past and current, who appeared at least in one game for the Miami Marlins franchise, known as the Florida Marlins from their inception in 1993 through the 2011 season.

Players in bold are members of the National Baseball Hall of Fame and Museum.

Players in italics have had their numbers retired by the team.

== A ==
- Jeff Abbott
- Kurt Abbott
- Reggie Abercrombie
- Juan Acevedo
- Maximo Acosta
- Joel Adamson
- Chris Aguila
- Jesús Aguilar
- Sandy Alcantara
- Jorge Alfaro
- Antonio Alfonseca
- Chad Allen
- Armando Almanza
- Héctor Almonte
- Moisés Alou
- Eddy Alvarez
- Henderson Álvarez
- Juan Alvarez
- Jacob Amaya
- Steve Ames
- Alfredo Amézaga
- Brian Anderson
- Nick Anderson
- Shaun Anderson
- Tim Anderson
- Robert Andino
- Matt Andriese
- Luis Aquino
- Oswaldo Arcia
- Alex Arias
- Luarbert Arias
- Jack Armstrong
- Shawn Armstrong
- Luis Arráez
- Willians Astudillo
- Bruce Aven
- Luis Ayala
- Manny Aybar

== B ==
- Lake Bachar
- Burke Badenhop
- Benito Báez
- Jeff Baker
- John Baker
- Paul Bako
- Willie Banks
- Brian Banks
- Bret Barberie
- Brian Barden
- Matt Barnes
- Daniel Barone
- Kyle Barraclough
- Manuel Barrios
- Anthony Bass
- Miguel Batista
- Mike Baumann
- Danny Bautista
- Yorman Bazardo
- Josh Beckett
- Josh Bell
- Heath Bell
- Andrew Bellatti
- Valente Bellozo
- Duane Below
- Anthony Bender
- Armando Benítez
- Chad Bentz
- Dave Berg
- Jonathan Bermúdez
- Gerónimo Berroa
- Jon Berti
- Christian Bethancourt
- Brent Billingsley
- JJ Bleday
- Richard Bleier
- Ricky Bones
- Emilio Bonifacio
- Bobby Bonilla
- Aaron Boone
- Josh Booty
- Joe Borchard
- Toby Borland
- Joe Borowski
- Justin Bour
- Ryan Bowen
- Brad Boxberger
- Archie Bradley
- Rob Brantly
- Huascar Brazobán
- Craig Breslow
- Austin Brice
- Jonah Bride
- Jeff Brigham
- Reid Brignac
- Greg Briley
- Lewis Brinson
- Jerry Brooks
- Brant Brown
- Jordan Brown
- Kevin Brown
- Jerry Browne
- Vidal Bruján
- John Buck
- Mark Buehrle
- Jay Buente
- Nate Bump
- Jake Burger
- John Burkett
- Peyton Burdick
- A. J. Burnett
- Homer Bush

== C ==
- Edward Cabrera
- Miguel Cabrera
- Owen Caissie
- Kiko Calero
- Mike Cameron
- Arquimedes Caminero
- Paul Campbell
- John Cangelosi
- Jorge Cantú
- Carter Capps
- Cris Carpenter
- Chuck Carr
- Matías Carrillo
- Brett Carroll
- Marcos Carvajal
- Andrew Cashner
- Daniel Castano
- Frank Castillo
- Luis Castillo
- Wilkin Castillo
- Ramón Castro
- Starlin Castro
- José Ceda
- Matt Cepicky
- Francisco Cervelli
- Hunter Cervenka
- JT Chargois
- Wei-Yin Chen
- Yonny Chirinos
- Jazz Chisholm Jr.
- Randy Choate
- Hee-Seop Choi
- Adam Cimber
- Steven Cishek
- Chris Clapinski
- Paul Clemens
- Matt Clement
- Chris Coghlan
- Greg Colbrunn
- Griffin Conine
- Jeff Conine
- Adam Conley
- Dennis Cook
- Garrett Cooper
- Archie Corbin
- Wil Cordero
- Erik Cordier
- Reid Cornelius
- Jim Corsi
- Jarred Cosart
- Henry Cotto
- Craig Counsell
- Scott Cousins
- Declan Cronin
- Jim Crowell
- Johnny Cueto
- Xzavion Curry
- John Curtiss

== D ==
- Vic Darensbourg
- Brian Daubach
- Darren Daulton
- David Davidson
- Brad Davis
- Jonathan Davis
- **Andre Dawson**
- Austin Dean
- Alejandro De Aza
- Brett de Geus
- Enmanuel De Jesus
- Bryan De La Cruz
- Eulogio De La Cruz
- Deyvison De Los Santos
- Valerio de los Santos
- Steve Decker
- Jesús Delgado
- Carlos Delgado
- Ryan Dempster
- Anthony DeSclafani
- Odrisamer Despaigne
- Orestes Destrade
- Ross Detwiler
- José Devers
- Isan Díaz
- Lewin Díaz
- Mario Díaz
- Matt Diaz
- Corey Dickerson
- Derek Dietrich
- Joe Dillon
- Greg Dobbs
- Matt Dominguez
- Brendan Donnelly
- Brian Drahman
- Robert Dugger
- Joe Dunand
- Matt Dunbar
- Michael Dunn
- Todd Dunwoody
- Adam Duvall
- Sam Dyson

== E ==
- Damion Easley
- Brian Edmondson
- Xavier Edwards
- Cody Ege
- Brett Eibner
- Jim Eisenreich
- Josh Ekness
- Brian Ellington
- Kent Emanuel
- Jerar Encarnación
- Juan Encarnación
- Nathan Eovaldi
- Jake Esch
- Carl Everett

== F ==
- Jorge Fábregas
- Pete Fairbanks
- Monty Fariss
- Calvin Faucher
- Junior Félix
- Alex Fernández
- José Fernández
- Nate Field
- Jake Fishman
- Dylan Floro
- Cliff Floyd
- Brian Flynn
- Joe Fontenot
- Logan Forsythe
- Nick Fortes
- Andy Fox
- Chad Fox
- Jeff Francoeur
- Willie Fraser
- Jeff Fulchino
- Dax Fulton
- Rafael Furcal

== G ==
- John Gall
- Zac Gallen
- Isaac Galloway
- Rich Garcés
- Amaury García
- Avisaíl García
- Guillermo Garcia
- Harvey García
- Jarlin García
- José García
- Robert Garcia
- Yimi García
- Lee Gardner
- Mark Gardner
- Braxton Garrett
- Chad Gaudin
- Franklyn Germán
- Cade Gibson
- Cole Gillespie
- Connor Gillispie
- Ross Gload
- Álex González
- Andy González
- Chi Chi González
- Erik González
- Gabe González
- Luis Gonzalez
- Nick Gordon
- Franklyn Gracesqui
- Curtis Granderson
- Tristan Gray
- Craig Grebeck
- Nick Green
- Adam Greenberg
- Kevin Gregg
- Tommy Gregg
- Jason Grilli
- Buddy Groom
- Jordan Groshans
- Sean Guenther
- Tayron Guerrero
- Preston Guilmet
- Mike Gulan
- Yuli Gurriel
- Ryan Gusto
- Vladimir Gutiérrez
- Jorge Guzman

== H ==
- Cody Hall
- Billy Hamilton
- Chris Hammond
- Garrett Hampson
- Brad Hand
- Dan Haren
- Lenny Harris
- Monte Harrison
- Geoff Hartlieb
- Bryan Harvey
- Chris Hatcher
- Brett Hayes
- Louis Head
- Andrew Heaney
- Adeiny Hechavarria
- Tyler Heineman
- Rick Helling
- Wes Helms
- Mark Hendrickson
- Oscar Henríquez
- Ronny Henriquez
- Payton Henry
- David Hensley
- Rosell Herrera
- Clay Hensley
- Félix Heredia
- Matt Herges
- Jeremy Hermida
- Elieser Hernandez
- Enrique Hernández
- Gorkys Hernández
- Heriberto Hernández
- Jeremy Hernandez
- Liván Hernández
- David Hess
- Liam Hicks
- Derek Hill
- Koyie Hill
- Bryan Hoeing
- **Trevor Hoffman**
- Bryan Holaday
- Todd Hollandsworth
- Jordan Holloway
- Paul Hoover
- Charlie Hough
- James Houser
- Ben Howard
- James Hoyt
- Bill Hurst
- Mark Hutton
- Tim Hyers

== I ==
- Omar Infante
- Hansel Izquierdo

== J ==
- Alex Jackson
- Edwin Jackson
- Ryan Jackson
- Mike Jacobs
- Mike Jeffcoat
- Dan Jennings
- Leo Jiménez
- Charles Johnson
- Chris Johnson
- Josh Johnson
- Nick Johnson
- Reed Johnson
- Troy Johnston
- John Johnstone
- Garrett Jones
- Hunter Jones
- Jacque Jones
- Todd Jones
- Ryan Jorgensen
- Matt Joyce
- Jorge Julio
- Janson Junk

== K ==
- Austin Kearns
- Kyle Keller
- Don Kelly
- William Kempner
- Logan Kensing
- Byung-hyun Kim
- Tyler Kinley
- Brandon Kintzler
- Austin Kitchen
- Joe Klink
- Randy Knorr
- Gary Knotts
- Billy Koch
- Tom Koehler
- John Koronka
- Casey Kotchman
- Mark Kotsay

== L ==
- AJ Ladwig
- Mike Lamb
- Andy Larkin
- Mat Latos
- Ryan Lavernway
- Raudel Lazo
- Charles Leblanc
- Wade LeBlanc
- Carlos Lee
- Derrek Lee
- Brandon Leibrandt
- Al Leiter
- Sandy León
- Chris Leroux
- Allen Levrault
- Richie Lewis
- Todd Linden
- Jeff Lindgren
- Matt Lindstrom
- Graeme Lloyd
- Jeff Locke
- Paul Lo Duca
- Braden Looper
- Jorge López
- José López
- Mendy López
- Otto Lopez
- Pablo López
- Mike Lowell
- Ed Lucas
- Eric Ludwick
- Héctor Luna
- Jesús Luzardo
- Mitch Lyden

== M ==
- John Mabry
- Joe Mack
- Luís Madero
- Dave Magadan
- Ron Mahay
- Joe Mahoney
- John Maine
- Oswaldo Mairena
- Anthony Maldonado
- Marty Malloy
- Matt Mantei
- Josías Manzanillo
- Jhan Mariñez
- Jake Marisnick
- Carlos Mármol
- Deven Marrero
- Jakob Marsee
- Luis Marté
- Starling Marte
- Carlos Martinez
- Cristhian Martínez
- Osvaldo Martínez
- Sandy Martínez
- Seth Martinez
- Nick Masset
- Terry Mathews
- Jeff Mathis
- Kevin Mattison
- Cameron Maybin
- Vin Mazzaro
- Adam Mazur
- Darren McCaughan
- Bob McClure
- Casey McGehee
- Scott McGough
- Dustin McGowan
- Terry McGriff
- Ryan McGuire
- Billy McMillon
- John McMillon
- Dallas McPherson
- Brian Meadows
- Jim Mecir
- Rafael Medina
- Adalberto Méndez
- Matt Mervis
- Víctor Mesa Jr.
- Randy Messenger
- Dan Meyer
- Max Meyer
- Dan Miceli
- Kevin Millar
- Andrew Miller
- Brian Miller
- Jai Miller
- Justin Miller
- Kurt Miller
- Ralph Milliard
- Bryan Mitchell
- Sergio Mitre
- Brian Moehler
- Patrick Monteverde
- Tyler Moore
- Brian Moran
- Christopher Morel
- Shawn Morimando
- Mike Morin
- Mike Mordecai
- Russ Morman
- Logan Morrison
- Michael Morse
- Guillermo Mota
- Chad Mottola
- Lyle Mouton
- Edward Mujica
- Roddery Muñoz
- Donnie Murphy
- Rob Murphy
- Jeff Mutis
- Dane Myers
- Mike Myers

== N ==
- Tommy Nance
- Andrew Nardi
- Chris Narveson
- Brian Navarreto
- Bob Natal
- Blaine Neal
- Nick Neidert
- Joe Nelson
- Robb Nen
- Mike Neu
- Justin Nicolino
- Ricky Nolasco
- Hector Noesi
- Sean Nolin
- Connor Norby
- Abraham Núñez
- Leo Núñez
- Vladimir Núñez

== O ==
- Peter O'Brien
- Greg O'Halloran
- Wes Obermueller
- Nefi Ogando
- Will Ohman
- Kirt Ojala
- Steven Okert
- Darren Oliver
- Miguel Olivo
- Adam Oller
- Edgar Olmos
- Kevin Olsen
- Scott Olsen
- Kevin Orie
- Joe Orsulak
- Henry Owens
- Eric Owens
- Marcell Ozuna
- Pablo Ozuna

== P ==
- Cristian Pache
- Donn Pall
- Joe Panik
- Ronny Paulino
- Graham Pauley
- Carl Pavano
- Alejandro Peña
- Terry Pendleton
- Hayden Penn
- Brad Penny
- Jhonny Pereda
- Eury Pérez
- Yefri Perez
- Yorkis Pérez
- Matt Perisho
- Bryan Petersen
- Michael Petersen
- Yusmeiro Petit
- David Phelps
- Tommy Phelps
- Tyler Phillips
- Zach Phillips
- **Mike Piazza**
- Juan Pierre
- Robinson Piña
- Renyel Pinto
- Plácido Polanco
- Gus Polidor
- Zach Pop
- Scott Pose
- Cody Poteet
- Jay Powell
- Martín Prado
- Austin Pruitt
- Cesar Puello
- A. J. Puk

== Q ==
- Chad Qualls
- Cal Quantrill
- Paul Quantrill
- Johan Quezada
- José Quijada

== R ==
- Mike Rabelo
- **Tim Raines**
- Jack Ralston
- Agustín Ramírez
- Emmanuel Ramírez
- Erasmo Ramirez
- Hanley Ramírez
- Harold Ramírez
- Julio Ramirez
- AJ Ramos
- Pat Rapp
- Jon Rauch
- Colin Rea
- J. T. Realmuto
- Mark Redman
- Mike Redmond
- Eric Reed
- Édgar Rentería
- Rick Renteria
- Chris Resop
- Jo-Jo Reyes
- Jose Reyes
- Arthur Rhodes
- Trevor Richards
- J. T. Riddle
- John Riedling
- Emmanuel Rivera
- Mike Rivera
- Yadiel Rivera
- Christian Roa
- Nate Robertson
- David Robertson
- Fernando Rodney
- **Iván Rodríguez**
- Henry Rodríguez
- Henry Rodríguez
- Rich Rodríguez
- Sean Rodriguez
- Trevor Rogers
- Miguel Rojas
- Nate Rolison
- Sergio Romo
- Sandy Rosario
- John Roskos
- Cody Ross
- Vinny Rottino
- Johnny Ruffin
- Justin Ruggiano

== S ==
- Jarrod Saltalamacchia
- Alex Sanabia
- Brian Sanches
- Ali Sánchez
- Aníbal Sánchez
- Gaby Sánchez
- Jesus Sánchez
- Jesús Sánchez
- Sixto Sánchez
- Javier Sanoja
- Benito Santiago
- Tony Saunders
- Rich Scheid
- Tanner Scott
- Xavier Scruggs
- Rudy Seánez
- Chris Seddon
- Jean Segura
- Jared Serna
- Gary Sheffield
- Joe Siddall
- Magneuris Sierra
- Ronny Simon
- Josh Simpson
- Brett Sinkbeil
- Kyle Skipworth
- Austin Slater
- Kevin Slowey
- Aaron Small
- Devin Smeltzer
- Burch Smith
- Caleb Smith
- Chuck Smith
- Josh Smith
- Josh Smith
- Mark Smith
- Travis Smith
- Robby Snelling
- Donovan Solano
- Jhonatan Solano
- Jorge Soler
- George Soriano
- Jorge Sosa
- Justin Speier
- Tim Spooneybarger
- Dennis Springer
- Ryne Stanek
- Jacob Stallings
- Rob Stanifer
- Giancarlo Stanton
- Drew Steckenrider
- Kyle Stowers
- Dan Straily
- Dee Strange-Gordon
- Scott Strickland
- Joe Strong
- Cole Sulser
- Larry Sutton
- **Ichiro Suzuki**

== T ==
- Taylor Tankersley
- Freddy Tarnok
- Stephen Tarpley
- Jesús Tavárez
- Julián Tavárez
- Graham Taylor
- Junichi Tazawa
- Michael Tejera
- Tomas Telis
- Nate Teut
- Ryan Thompson
- Zach Thompson
- Joe Thurston
- Ron Tingley
- Jesus Tinoco
- Chad Tracy
- Matt Treanor
- Ryan Tucker
- Jacob Turner
- Matt Turner
- Kyle Tyler

== U ==
- Dan Uggla
- Ugueth Urbina
- Jose Urena

== V ==
- Chris Valaika
- Marc Valdes
- Jordany Valdespin
- Ismael Valdéz
- Rick VandenHurk
- Jason Vargas
- Javier Vázquez
- Gil Velazquez
- Pat Venditte
- Anthony Veneziano
- José Veras
- Quilvio Veras
- Randy Veres
- Alex Vesia
- Eli Villalobos
- Elih Villanueva
- Jonathan Villar
- Ron Villone
- Nick Vincent
- Victor Vodnik
- Chris Volstad
- Ed Vosberg

== W ==
- Doug Waechter
- Eric Wagaman
- Forrest Wall
- Chad Wallach
- Neil Walker
- Justin Wayne
- David Weathers
- Ryan Weathers
- Ryan Webb
- John Wehner
- Walt Weiss
- Todd Wellemeyer
- Joey Wendle
- Sean West
- Matt Whisenant
- Devon White
- Darrell Whitmore
- Joey Wiemer
- Gerald Williams
- Luke Williams
- Josh Willingham
- Dontrelle Willis
- Josh Wilson
- Nigel Wilson
- Preston Wilson
- Jack Winkler
- DeWayne Wise
- Bobby Witt
- Nick Wittgren
- Randy Wolf
- Ross Wolf
- Jason Wood
- Tim Wood

== Y ==
- Jimmy Yacabonis
- Jordan Yamamoto
- Christian Yelich

== Z ==
- Aneurys Zabala
- Carlos Zambrano
- Mauro Zárate
- Gregg Zaun
- Todd Zeile
- Brad Ziegler
- Eddie Zosky
- Tyler Zuber
