= 2025 Miami Marlins season =

2025 Miami Marlins
- League: National League
- Division: East
- Ballpark: LoanDepot Park
- City: Miami, Florida
- Record: 79–83 (.488)
- Divisional place: 3rd
- Owners: Bruce Sherman
- President of baseball operations: Peter Bendix
- Manager: Clayton McCullough
- Television: FanDuel Sports Network Florida; FanDuel Sports Network Sun; CW Miami 33 (Note: Select 15 Games to Be Simulcasted from FanDuel Sports Network Florida)
- Radio: WINZ; Miami Marlins Radio Network (English)

The 2025 Miami Marlins season was the 33rd season for the Major League Baseball (MLB) franchise in the National League. The Marlins played their home games at LoanDepot Park as members of the National League East Division. In their first year under manager Clayton McCullough, the Marlins improved on their 62–100 record from 2024, going 79–83 and finishing third in the NL East.

On September 25, the Marlins were eliminated from playoff contention for their second consecutive season after a 0–1 loss to the Philadelphia Phillies.

For the third time in franchise history, the Marlins eliminated the New York Mets from playoff contention on the final day of the regular season, which allowed the Cincinnati Reds to clinch the final playoff spot instead.

== Offseason ==
The Marlins finished the 2024 season with a 62–100 record, which was a 22-game step back from their 84–78 record in 2023. The team announced on September 29 that manager Skip Schumaker would not return for the 2025 season.

On November 11, 2024, the Marlins hired Clayton McCullough to be the franchise's 17th manager in their history.

== Regular season ==
=== Season standings ===
==== National League East ====
NL East
Team	W	L	Pct.	GB	Home	Road
Philadelphia Phillies	96	66	.593	—	55‍–‍26	41‍–‍40
New York Mets	83	79	.512	13	49‍–‍32	34‍–‍47
Miami Marlins	79	83	.488	17	38‍–‍43	41‍–‍40
Atlanta Braves	76	86	.469	20	39‍–‍42	37‍–‍44
Washington Nationals	66	96	.407	30	32‍–‍49	34‍–‍47

==== National League Wild Card ====
Division leaders
Team	W	L	Pct.
Milwaukee Brewers	97	65	.599
Philadelphia Phillies	96	66	.593
Los Angeles Dodgers	93	69	.574

Wild Card teams (Top 3 teams qualify for postseason)
Team	W	L	Pct.	GB
Chicago Cubs	92	70	.568	+9
San Diego Padres	90	72	.556	+7
Cincinnati Reds	83	79	.512	—
New York Mets	83	79	.512	—
San Francisco Giants	81	81	.500	2
Arizona Diamondbacks	80	82	.494	3
Miami Marlins	79	83	.488	4
St. Louis Cardinals	78	84	.481	5
Atlanta Braves	76	86	.469	7
Pittsburgh Pirates	71	91	.438	12
Washington Nationals	66	96	.407	17
Colorado Rockies	43	119	.265	40

==== Record vs. opponents ====
===== Record vs. National League =====
2025 National League record Source: MLB Standings Grid – 2025
Team	AZ	ATL	CHC	CIN	COL	LAD	MIA	MIL	NYM	PHI	PIT	SD	SF	STL	WSH	AL
Arizona	—	4–2	3–4	2–4	8–5	6–7	3–3	4–3	3–3	3–3	2–4	5–8	7–6	3–3	2–4	25–23
Atlanta	2–4	—	2–4	5–2	4–2	1–5	8–5	2–4	8–5	5–8	2–4	1–6	1–5	4–2	9–4	22–26
Chicago	4–3	4–2	—	5–8	5–1	4–3	4–2	7–6	2–4	2–4	10–3	3–3	1–5	8–5	3–3	30–18
Cincinnati	4–2	2–5	8–5	—	5–1	1–5	3–4	5–8	4–2	3–3	7–6	4–2	3–3	6–7	2–4	26–22
Colorado	5–8	2–4	1–5	1–5	—	2–11	3–3	2–4	0–6	0–7	2–4	3–10	2–11	4–2	4–3	12–36
Los Angeles	7–6	5–1	3–4	5–1	11–2	—	5–1	0–6	3–4	2–4	2–4	9–4	9–4	2–4	3–3	27–21
Miami	3–3	5–8	2–4	4–3	3–3	1–5	—	3–3	7–6	4–9	4–3	3–3	4–2	3–3	7–6	26–22
Milwaukee	3–4	4–2	6–7	8–5	4–2	6–0	3–3	—	4–2	4–2	10–3	2–4	2–5	7–6	6–0	28–20
New York	3–3	5–8	4–2	2–4	6–0	4–3	6–7	2–4	—	7–6	2–4	2–4	4–2	5–2	7–6	24–24
Philadelphia	3–3	8–5	4–2	3–3	7–0	4–2	9–4	2–4	6–7	—	3–3	3–3	3–4	2–4	8–5	31–17
Pittsburgh	4–2	4–2	3–10	6–7	4–2	4–2	3–4	3–10	4–2	3–3	—	1–5	4–2	7–6	4–3	17–31
San Diego	8–5	6–1	3–3	2–4	10–3	4–9	3–3	4–2	4–2	3–3	5–1	—	10–3	4–3	4–2	20–28
San Francisco	6–7	5–1	5–1	3–3	11–2	4–9	2–4	5–2	2–4	4–3	2–4	3–10	—	2–4	3–3	24–24
St. Louis	3–3	2–4	5–8	7–6	2–4	4–2	3–3	6–7	2–5	4–2	6–7	3–4	4–2	—	5–1	22–26
Washington	4–2	4–9	3–3	4–2	3–4	3–3	6–7	0–6	6–7	5–8	3–4	2–4	3–3	1–5	—	19–29

Updated with the results of all games through September 28, 2025.

===== Record vs. American League =====
2025 National League record vs. American League Source: MLB Standings
Team	ATH	BAL	BOS	CWS	CLE	DET	HOU	KC	LAA	MIN	NYY	SEA	TB	TEX	TOR
Arizona	2–1	2–1	2–1	2–1	2–1	0–3	0–3	1–2	1–2	2–1	2–1	3–0	1–2	4–2	1–2
Atlanta	1–2	0–3	3–3	2–1	3–0	3–0	1–2	1–2	1–2	3–0	1–2	1–2	1–2	0–3	1–2
Chicago	3–0	2–1	2–1	5–1	3–0	1–2	1–2	1–2	3–0	1–2	2–1	1–2	2–1	2–1	1–2
Cincinnati	0–3	2–1	1–2	1–2	5–1	2–1	1–2	2–1	2–1	2–1	2–1	1–2	3–0	1–2	1–2
Colorado	1–2	1–2	0–3	1–2	1–2	0–3	2–4	0–3	2–1	2–1	1–2	0–3	1–2	0–3	0–3
Los Angeles	2–1	1–2	1–2	3–0	2–1	3–0	0–3	2–1	0–6	2–1	2–1	3–0	2–1	2–1	2–1
Miami	1–2	2–1	1–2	1–2	1–2	2–1	1–2	2–1	2–1	2–1	3–0	1–2	3–3	3–0	1–2
Milwaukee	2–1	2–1	3–0	2–1	1–2	2–1	2–1	2–1	3–0	4–2	0–3	2–1	1–2	0–3	2–1
New York	2–1	1–2	1–2	2–1	0–3	2–1	1–2	2–1	3–0	1–2	3–3	2–1	0–3	1–2	3–0
Philadelphia	2–1	2–1	2–1	1–2	2–1	2–1	0–3	2–1	1–2	2–1	2–1	3–0	3–0	3–0	4–2
Pittsburgh	2–1	0–3	2–1	0–3	0–3	4–2	1–2	0–3	2–1	1–2	1–2	0–3	1–2	1–2	2–1
San Diego	2–1	0–3	2–1	2–1	3–0	1–2	1–2	2–1	2–1	1–2	1–2	1–5	0–3	2–1	0–3
San Francisco	5–1	2–1	2–1	1–2	1–2	0–3	3–0	1–2	1–2	0–3	2–1	3–0	1–2	2–1	0–3
St. Louis	2–1	2–1	0–3	3–0	3–0	1–2	2–1	3–3	1–2	3–0	0–3	0–3	1–2	1–2	0–3
Washington	1–2	5–1	0–3	1–2	1–2	2–1	1–2	1–2	2–1	2–1	0–3	2–1	0–3	1–2	0–3

Updated with the results of all games through September 28, 2025.

=== Game log ===
Legend
	Marlins win
	Marlins loss
	Postponement
	Eliminated from playoff contention
**Bold**	Marlins team member

2025 Game Log: 79–83 (Home: 38–43; Away: 41–40)
March/April: 12–18 (Home: 8–8; Away: 4–10)

#	Date	Opponent	Score	Win	Loss	Save	Attendance	Record	Box/Streak
1	March 27	Pirates	5–4	**Tinoco** (1–0)	Bednar (0–1)	—	31,534	1–0	W1
2	March 28	Pirates	3–4	Keller (1–0)	**Gillispie** (0–1)	Bednar (1)	9,590	1–1	L1
3	March 29	Pirates	5–4 (12)	**Soriano** (1–0)	Wentz (0–1)	―	10,207	2–1	W1
4	March 30	Pirates	3–2	**Bender** (1–0)	Bednar (0–2)	―	15,490	3–1	W2
5	March 31	Mets	4–10	Peterson (1–0)	**Quantrill** (0–1)	―	12,953	3–2	L1
6	April 1	Mets	4–2	**Alcántara** (1–0)	Senga (0–1)	**Bender** (1)	13,740	4–2	W1
7	April 2	Mets	5–6 (11)	Buttó (1–0)	**Curry** (0–1)	Brazobán (1)	10,598	4–3	L1
8	April 4	@ Braves	0–10	Schwellenbach (1–0)	**Meyer** (0–1)	―	41,583	4–4	L2
9	April 5	@ Braves	4–0	**Quantrill** (1–1)	Smith-Shawver (0–2)	―	39,734	5–4	W1
―	April 6	@ Braves	Postponed (rain); Makeup: August 9						
10	April 7	@ Mets	0–2	Senga (1–1)	**Bellozo** (0–1)	Stanek (1)	28,630	5–5	L1
11	April 8	@ Mets	5–10	Holmes (1–1)	**Faucher** (0–1)	―	28,861	5–6	L2
12	April 9	@ Mets	5–0	**Meyer** (1–1)	Megill (2–1)	―	29,232	6–6	W1
13	April 11	Nationals	4–7	Sims (1–0)	**Bender** (1–1)	Finnegan (5)	9,094	6–7	L1
14	April 12	Nationals	7–6	**Alcántara** (2–0)	Williams (1–1)	**Faucher** (1)	18,469	7–7	W1
15	April 13	Nationals	11–4	**Henríquez** (1–0)	Gore (1–2)	―	13,969	8–7	W2
16	April 15	Diamondbacks	4–10	Kelly (3–1)	**Gillispie** (0–2)	―	7,324	8–8	L1
17	April 16	Diamondbacks	2–6	Pfaadt (3–1)	**Meyer** (1–2)	―	8,438	8–9	L2
18	April 17	Diamondbacks	4–6	Rodríguez (1–2)	**Cabrera** (0–1)	Puk (4)	8,616	8–10	L3
19	April 18	@ Phillies	2–7	Wheeler (2–1)	**Alcántara** (2–1)	―	44,949	8–11	L4
20	April 19	@ Phillies	10–11	Strahm (1–0)	**Quantrill** (1–2)	Alvarado (5)	45,045	8–12	L5
21	April 20	@ Phillies	7–5 (10)	**Faucher** (1–1)	Strahm (1–1)	**Tinoco** (1)	45,079	9–12	W1
22	April 21	Reds	6–3	**Meyer** (2–2)	Lodolo (2–2)	**Tinoco** (2)	7,646	10–12	W2
23	April 22	Reds	4–3	**Bachar** (1–0)	Ashcraft (0–2)	**Faucher** (2)	7,996	11–12	W3
24	April 23	Reds	2–5	Singer (4–0)	**Alcántara** (2–2)	Pagán (5)	6,575	11–13	L1
25	April 25	@ Mariners	8–4	**Quantrill** (2–2)	Lawrence (1–1)	―	29,753	12–13	W1
26	April 26	@ Mariners	0–14	Castillo (3–2)	**Gillispie** (0–3)	―	35,362	12–14	L1
27	April 27	@ Mariners	6–7	Evans (1–0)	**Meyer** (2–3)	Muñoz (10)	30,361	12–15	L2
28	April 28	@ Dodgers	6–7 (10)	Yates (3–1)	**Henríquez** (1–1)	―	48,232	12–16	L3
29	April 29	@ Dodgers	2–15	Sauer (1–0)	**Alcántara** (2–3)	―	46,502	12–17	L4
30	April 30	@ Dodgers	7–12	Gonsolin (1–0)	**Quantrill** (2–3)	―	47,192	12–18	L5

May: 11–15 (Home: 6–8; Away: 5–7)

#	Date	Opponent	Score	Win	Loss	Save	Attendance	Record	Box/Streak
31	May 2	Athletics	1–6	Hoglund (1–0)	**Bellozo** (0–2	―	8,864	12–19	L6
32	May 3	Athletics	9–6	**Bachar** (2–0)	Miller (0–1)	―	13,543	13–19	W1
33	May 4	Athletics	2–3	Spence (1–0)	**Bender** (1–2)	Ferguson (1)	17,690	13–20	L1
34	May 5	Dodgers	4–7	Casparius (4–0)	**Alcántara** (2–4)	Yates (1)	15,395	13–21	L2
35	May 6	Dodgers	5–4 (10)	**Tinoco** (2–0)	Feyereisen (0–2)	―	17,312	14–21	W1
36	May 7	Dodgers	1–10	Knack (2–0)	**Gibson** (0–1)	Sauer (1)	13,635	14–22	L1
37	May 9	@ White Sox	2–6	Booser (1–3)	**Meyer** (2–4)	—	18,992	14–23	L2
38	May 10	@ White Sox	3–1	**Faucher** (2–1)	Leasure (0–3)	**Tinoco** (3)	24,264	15–23	W1
39	May 11	@ White Sox	2–4	Vasil (2–1)	**Alcántara** (2–5)	Booser (1)	16,805	15–24	L1
40	May 12	@ Cubs	2–5	Rea (3–0)	**Quantrill** (2–4)	Pomeranz (1)	32,271	15–25	L2
41	May 13	@ Cubs	4–5	Flexen (1–0)	**Tinoco** (2–1)	—	38,083	15–26	L3
42	May 14	@ Cubs	3–1	**Weathers** (1–0)	Taillon (2–3)	**Tinoco** (4)	34,167	16–26	W1
43	May 16	Rays	9–4	**Meyer** (3–4)	Bradley (3–3)	—	11,714	17–26	W2
44	May 17	Rays	0–4	Rasmussen (2–4)	**Alcántara** (2–6)	—	12,052	17–27	L1
45	May 18	Rays	5–1	**Quantrill** (3–4)	Baz (3–3)	―	10,529	18–27	W1
46	May 19	Cubs	8–7	**Bellozo** (1–2)	Palencia (0–1)	―	9,935	19–27	W2
47	May 20	Cubs	1–14	Taillon (3–3)	**Weathers** (1–1)	―	9,567	19–28	L1
48	May 21	Cubs	1–2	Keller (1–0)	**Bender** (1–3)	Palencia (1)	7,482	19–29	L2
49	May 23	@ Angels	4–7	Kikuchi (1–4)	**Alcántara** (2–7)	Jansen (11)	28,116	19–30	L3
50	May 24	@ Angels	6–2	**Henríquez** (2–1)	Soriano (3–5)	**Junk** (1)	29,301	20–30	W1
51	May 25	@ Angels	3–0	**Cabrera** (1–1)	Hendricks (2–6)	**Henríquez** (1)	37,074	21–30	W2
52	May 26	@ Padres	3–4 (11)	Morejón (2–2)	**Gibson** (0–2)	―	40,872	21–31	L1
53	May 27	@ Padres	6–8	Kolek (3–1)	**Gibson** (0–3)	Estrada (1)	40,363	21–32	L2
54	May 28	@ Padres	10–8	**Henríquez** (3–1)	Adam (5–1)	**Faucher** (3)	33,885	22–32	W1
55	May 30	Giants	0–2	Harrison (1–1)	**Quantrill** (3–5)	Doval (6)	10,361	22–33	L1
56	May 31	Giants	1–0	**Cabrera** (2–1)	Ray (7–1)	**Faucher** (4)	12,387	23–33	W1

June: 14–12 (Home: 3–8; Away: 11–4)

#	Date	Opponent	Score	Win	Loss	Save	Attendance	Record	Box/Streak
57	June 1	Giants	2–4	Birdsong (3–1)	**Weathers** (1–1)	Doval (7)	13,422	23–34	L1
58	June 2	Rockies	4–6	Márquez (2–7)	**Meyer** (3–5)	Agnos (4)	5,894	23–35	L2
59	June 3	Rockies	2–3	Vodnik (1–1)	**Bender** (1–4)	Halvorsen (3)	7,583	23–36	L3
60	June 4	Rockies	2–3	Freeland (1–8)	**Quantrill** (3–6)	Kinley (2)	6,261	23–37	L4
61	June 6	@ Rays	3–4	Littell (6–5)	**Cabrera** (2–2)	Fairbanks (12)	8,448	23–38	L5
62	June 7	@ Rays	11–10 (10)	**Gibson** (1–3)	Cleavinger (0–2)	―	10,046	24–38	W1
63	June 8	@ Rays	2–3	Uceta (5–1)	**Bellozo** (1–3)	―	9,014	24–39	L1
64	June 9	@ Pirates	3–10	Ferguson (2–0)	**Pérez** (0–1)	―	9,283	24–40	L2
65	June 10	@ Pirates	3–2	**Alcántara** (3–7)	Keller (1–9)	**Faucher** (5)	14,465	25–40	W1
66	June 11	@ Pirates	2–5	Falter (5–3)	**Quantrill** (3–7)	Bednar (9)	16,709	25–41	L1
67	June 13	@ Nationals	11–9	**Phillips** (1–0)	Parker (4–7)	**Faucher** (6)	31,098	26–41	W1
68	June 14	@ Nationals	4–3	**Junk** (1–0)	Williams (3–8)	**Faucher** (7)	21,129	27–41	W2
69	June 15	@ Nationals	3–1	**Bachar** (3–0)	Gore (3–6)	**Tarnok** (1)	28,293	28–41	W3
70	June 16	Phillies	2–5	Abel (2–0)	**Alcántara** (3–8)	Kerkering (1)	9,898	28–42	L1
71	June 17	Phillies	8–3	**Tarnok** (1–0)	Luzardo (6–3)	―	8,300	29–42	W1
72	June 18	Phillies	2–4	Suárez (6–1)	**Mazur** (0–1)	Strahm (4)	9,570	29–43	L1
73	June 19	Phillies	1–2	Sánchez (6–2)	**Bender** (1–5)	Kerkering (2)	10,411	29–44	L2
74	June 20	Braves	6–2	**Junk** (2–0)	Fuentes (0–1)	—	12,146	30–44	W1
75	June 21	Braves	0–7	Holmes (4–6)	**Pérez** (0–2)	—	21,198	30–45	L1
76	June 22	Braves	5–3	**Alcántara** (4–8)	Elder (2–4)	**Henríquez** (2)	16,486	31–45	W1
77	June 24	@ Giants	4–2	**Gibson** (2–3)	Verlander (0–5)	**Faucher** (8)	28,643	32–45	W2
78	June 25	@ Giants	8–5 (10)	**Faucher** (3–2)	Doval (3–2)	—	31,712	33–45	W3
79	June 26	@ Giants	12–5	**Simpson** (1–0)	Birdsong (3–2)	—	33,804	34–45	W4
80	June 27	@ Diamondbacks	9–8	**Henriquez** (4–1)	Kelly (7–4)	—	26,696	35–45	W5
81	June 28	@ Diamondbacks	8–7 (10)	**Bender** (2–5)	Morillo (0–2)	—	28,446	36–45	W6
82	June 29	@ Diamondbacks	6–4	**Bachar** (4–0)	Beeks (2–1)	**Henríquez** (3)	30,653	37–45	W7

July: 15–10 (Home: 7–5; Away: 8–5)

#	Date	Opponent	Score	Win	Loss	Save	Attendance	Record	Box/Streak
83	July 1	Twins	2–0	**Cabrera** (3–2)	Ryan (8–4)	**Henríquez** (4)	7,860	38–45	W8
84	July 2	Twins	1–2	Woods Richardson (4–4)	**Junk** (2–1)	Durán (13)	7,596	38–46	L1
85	July 3	Twins	4–1	**Pérez** (1–2)	Festa (2–3)	**Henríquez** (5)	9,690	39–46	W1
86	July 4	Brewers	5–6	Ashby (1–0)	**Gibson** (2–4)	Megill (19)	16,716	39–47	L1
87	July 5	Brewers	4–2	**Henríquez** (5–1)	Mears (1–2)	**Bachar** (1)	11,378	40–47	W1
88	July 6	Brewers	1–3	Woodruff (1–0)	**Cabrera** (3–3)	Megill (20)	12,513	40–48	L1
89	July 7	@ Reds	5–1	**Junk** (3–1)	Singer (7–7)	**Bender** (2)	17,167	41–48	W1
90	July 8	@ Reds	12–2	**Pérez** (2–2)	Martinez (6–9)	—	22,399	42–48	W2
91	July 9	@ Reds	2–7	Abbott (8–1)	**Alcántara** (4–9)	—	15,867	42–49	L1
92	July 10	@ Reds	0–6	Lodolo (6–6)	**Quantrill** (3–8)	—	28,950	42–50	L2
93	July 11	@ Orioles	2–5	Kremer (8–7)	**Cabrera** (3–4)	—	22,213	42–51	L3
94	July 12	@ Orioles	6–0	**Junk** (4–1)	Rogers (2–1)	―	34,332	43–51	W1
95	July 13	@ Orioles	11–1	**Pérez** (3–2)	Young (0–4)	—	17,759	44–51	W2
–	July 15	95th All-Star Game	American League vs. National League (Truist Park, Cumberland, Georgia)						
96	July 18	Royals	8–7 (10)	**Bachar** (5–0)	Estévez (4–3)	—	14,442	45–51	W3
97	July 19	Royals	3–1	**Henríquez** (6–1)	Erceg (4–3)	**Bender** (3)	14,292	46–51	W4
98	July 20	Royals	4–7	Bubic (8–6)	**Junk** (4–2)	Estévez (26)	18,219	46–52	L1
99	July 21	Padres	1–2	Morejón (8–4)	**Pérez** (3–3)	Suárez (29)	11,128	46–53	L2
100	July 22	Padres	4–3	**Cabrera** (4–4)	Kolek (3–5)	**Henríquez** (6)	11,621	47–53	W1
101	July 23	Padres	3–2	**Alcántara** (5–9)	Cease (3–10)	**Faucher** (9)	15,137	48–53	W2
102	July 25	@ Brewers	5–1	**Simpson** (2–0)	Ashby (1–1)	—	41,944	49–53	W3
103	July 26	@ Brewers	7–4	**Junk** (5–2)	Quintana (7–4)	**Phillips** (1)	38,055	50–53	W4
104	July 27	@ Brewers	2–3	Megill (3–2)	**Gibson** (2–5)	―	40,158	50–54	L1
105	July 28	@ Cardinals	1–7	Pallante (6–7)	**Cabrera** (4–5)	—	20,510	50–55	L2
106	July 29	@ Cardinals	5–0	**Alcántara** (6–9)	Gray (10–5)	—	20,523	51–55	W1
107	July 30	@ Cardinals	2–0	**Quantrill** (4–8)	Mikolas (6–8)	**Faucher** (10)	20,813	52–55	W2

August: 13–17 (Home: 7–8; Away: 6–9)

#	Date	Opponent	Score	Win	Loss	Save	Attendance	Record	Box/Streak
108	August 1	Yankees	13–12	**Bender** (3–5)	Doval (4–3)	—	32,299	53–55	W3
109	August 2	Yankees	2–0	**Pérez** (4–3)	Schlittler (1–2)	**Faucher** (11)	34,645	54–55	W4
110	August 3	Yankees	7–3	**Cabrera** (5–5)	Gil (0–1)	―	34,601	55–55	W5
111	August 4	Astros	2–8	Alexander (2–1)	**Alcántara** (6–10)	—	10,827	55–56	L1
112	August 5	Astros	3–7	Blubaugh (1–1)	**Quantrill** (4–9)	—	12,186	55–57	L2
113	August 6	Astros	6–4	**Junk** (6–2)	Arrighetti (1–2)	**Bachar** (2)	10,073	56–57	W1
114	August 7	@ Braves	6–8	Johnson (3–3)	**Simpson** (2–1)	Iglesias (15)	32,460	56–58	L1
115	August 8	@ Braves	5–1	**Cabrera** (6–5)	Elder (4–9)	—	32,717	57–58	W1
116	August 9 (1)	@ Braves	1–7	Waldrep (2–0)	**Gusto** (7–5)	―	35,664	57–59	L1
117	August 9 (2)	@ Braves	6–8	Fedde (4–12)	**Alcántara** (6–11)	Iglesias (16)	35,433	57–60	L2
118	August 10	@ Braves	1–7	Wentz (3–3)	**Phillips** (1–1)	―	31,203	57–61	L3
119	August 12	@ Guardians	3–4	Smith (5–4)	**Faucher** (3–3)	―	21,874	57–62	L4
120	August 13	@ Guardians	13–4	**Pérez** (5–3)	Allard (2–2)	―	19,738	58–62	W1
121	August 14	@ Guardians	4–9	Bibee (9–9)	**Cabrera** (6–6)	Smith (6)	22,605	58–63	L1
122	August 15	@ Red Sox	1–2	Chapman (4–2)	**Simpson** (2–2)	―	36,854	58–64	L2
123	August 16	@ Red Sox	5–7	Bello (9–6)	**Quantrill** (4–10)	Chapman (22)	36,192	58–65	L3
124	August 17	@ Red Sox	5–3	**Phillips** (2–1)	Weissert (4–4)	**Bender** (4)	35,931	59–65	W1
125	August 18	Cardinals	3–8	Svanson (2–0)	**Bachar** (5–1)	—	8,555	59–66	L1
126	August 19	Cardinals	4–7	McGreevy (5–2)	**Cabrera** (6–7)	O'Brien (2)	7,612	59–67	L2
127	August 20	Cardinals	6–2	**Alcántara** (7–11)	Pallante (6–11)	—	9,304	60–67	W1
128	August 22	Blue Jays	2–5	Bieber (1–0)	**Gusto** (7–6)	Hoffman (28)	14,923	60–68	L1
129	August 23	Blue Jays	6–7 (12)	Nance (1–0)	**Faucher** (3–4)	Little (1)	24,943	60–69	L2
130	August 24	Blue Jays	5–3	**Pérez** (6–3)	Gausman (8–10)	**Phillips** (2)	20,620	61–69	W1
131	August 25	Braves	2–1	**Cabrera** (7–7)	Strider (5–12)	**Faucher** (12)	8,111	62–69	W2
132	August 26	Braves	2–11	Kinley (3–3)	**Zuber** (0–1)	—	8,576	62–70	L1
133	August 27	Braves	1–12	Wentz (5–4)	**Gusto** (7–7)	—	12,453	62–71	L2
134	August 28	@ Mets	7–4	**Gibson** (5–3)	Soto (1–5)	**Faucher** (13)	37,975	63–71	W1
135	August 29	@ Mets	9–19	Tong (1–0)	**Pérez** (6–4)	―	42,112	63–72	L1
136	August 30	@ Mets	11–8	**Faucher** (4–4)	Rogers (4–5)	**Phillips** (3)	42,726	64–72	W1
137	August 31	@ Mets	5–1	**Alcántara** (8–11)	Senga (7–6)	―	43,302	65–72	W2

September: 14–11 (Home: 7–6; Away: 7–5)

#	Date	Opponent	Score	Win	Loss	Save	Attendance	Record	Box/Streak
138	September 1	@ Nationals	0–2	Alvarez (1–0)	**Bachar** (5–2)	Ferrer (5)	13,835	65–73	L1
139	September 2	@ Nationals	2–5	Cavalli (2–1)	**Mazur** (0–2)	Ferrer (6)	12,372	65–74	L2
140	September 3	@ Nationals	5–10	Rutledge (3–2)	**Pérez** (6–5)	―	11,190	65–75	L3
141	September 5	Phillies	3–9	Sánchez (12–5)	**Bellozo** (1–4)	―	15,118	65–76	L4
142	September 6	Phillies	2–4	Luzardo (13–6)	**Alcántara** (8–12)	Durán (27)	23,877	65–77	L5
143	September 7	Phillies	5–4	**Henríquez** (7–1)	Walker (4–8)	**Bachar** (3)	30,223	66–77	W1
144	September 8	Nationals	7–15	Cavalli (3–1)	**Junk** (6–3)	―	7,992	66–78	L1
145	September 9	Nationals	5–7	Parker (8–15)	**Mazur** (0–3)	Ferrer (8)	8,634	66–79	L2
146	September 10	Nationals	8–3	**Bachar** (6–2)	Irvin (8–12)	―	9,038	67–79	W1
147	September 11	Nationals	5–0	**Weathers** (2–1)	Gore (5–14)	―	10,110	68–79	W2
148	September 12	Tigers	8–2	**Alcántara** (9–12)	Skubal (13–5)	—	16,926	69–79	W3
149	September 13	Tigers	6–4 (11)	**Simpson** (3–2)	Montero (1–2)	—	21,014	70–79	W4
150	September 14	Tigers	0–2	Montero (5–3)	**Mazur** (0–4)	Vest (21)	24,638	70–80	L1
151	September 16	@ Rockies	6–5	**Pérez** (7–5)	Freeland (4–16)	**Henríquez** (7)	22,764	71–80	W1
152	September 17	@ Rockies	8–4	**Bachar** (7–2)	Hill (1–1)	―	21,682	72–80	W2
153	September 18	@ Rockies	9–7	**Alcántara** (10–12)	Gordon (6–7)	**Faucher** (14)	21,760	73–80	W3
154	September 19	@ Rangers	6–4 (12)	**Soriano** (2–0)	Corbin (7–10)	―	26,374	74–80	W4
155	September 20	@ Rangers	4–3	**Gibson** (4–5)	Leiter (9–10)	**Faucher** (15)	36,054	75–80	W5
156	September 21	@ Rangers	4–2	**Bachar** (8–2)	Kelly (12–9)	**Soriano** (1)	27,331	76–80	W6
157	September 23	@ Phillies	6–5 (11)	**Simpson** (4–2)	Trivino (3–2)	―	38,041	77–80	W7
158	September 24	@ Phillies	1–11	Luzardo (15–7)	**Weathers** (2–2)	—	36,816	77–81	L1
159	September 25	@ Phillies	0–1	Buehler (10–7)	**Junk** (6–4)	Robertson (2)	36,265	77–82	L2
160	September 26	Mets	6–2	**Alcántara** (11–12)	Sproat (0–2)	**Phillips** (4)	34,196	78–82	W1
161	September 27	Mets	0–5	Holmes (12–8)	**Pérez** (7–6)	—	35,609	78–83	L1
162	September 28	Mets	4–0	**Cabrera** (8–7)	Raley (3–1)	―	34,660	79–83	W1

== Roster ==
2025 Miami Marlins
Roster
Pitchers: 22 Sandy Alcántara; 76 Luarbert Arias; 84 Lake Bachar; 83 Valente Bellozo; 37 Anthony Bender; 27 Edward Cabrera; 49 Xzavion Curry; 53 Calvin Faucher; 58 Cade Gibson; 55 Connor Gillispie; 65 Ryan Gusto; 32 Ronny Henriquez; 26 Janson Junk; 40 Seth Martinez; 60 Adam Mazur; 23 Max Meyer; 44 Patrick Monteverde; 39 Eury Pérez; 49 Michael Petersen; 30 Tyler Phillips; 81 Robinson Piña; 47 Cal Quantrill; 82 Christian Roa; 66 Josh Simpson; 62 George Soriano; 56 Freddy Tarnok; 38 Jesús Tinoco; 59 Anthony Veneziano; 35 Ryan Weathers; 55 Tyler Zuber	Catchers: 19 Rob Brantly; 4 Nick Fortes; 64 Heriberto Hernández; 34 Liam Hicks; 70 Brian Navarreto; 50 Agustín Ramírez; Infielders: 24 Maximo Acosta; 41 Jonah Bride; 9 Xavier Edwards; 6 Otto Lopez; 36 Matt Mervis; 1 Connor Norby; 21 Graham Pauley; 33 Eric Wagaman; 63 Jack Winkler	Outfielders: 18 Griffin Conine; 3 Derek Hill; 75 Troy Johnston; 87 Jakob Marsee; 10 Víctor Mesa Jr.; 54 Dane Myers; 7 Jesús Sánchez; 86 Javier Sanoja; 41 Ronny Simon; 28 Kyle Stowers; 41 Joey Wiemer	Manager: 86 Clayton McCullough; Coaches: 99 Chi Chi González (bullpen catcher); 85 Pedro Guerrero (hitting); 45 Blake Lalli (third base); 72 Aaron Leanhardt (field coordinator); 48 Alon Leichman (assistant pitching); 52 Brandon Mann (bullpen / pitching strategist); 57 Daniel Moskos (pitching); -- Bryson Nakamura (performance); 67 Derek Shomon (assistant hitting); 44 Joe Singley (catching); 31 Tyler Smarslok (first base / infield / basebrunning); 25 Carson Vitale (bench)

== Player stats ==
= Indicates team leader

=== Batting ===
Note: G = Games played; AB = At bats; R = Runs scored; H = Hits; 2B = Doubles; 3B = Triples; HR = Home runs; RBI = Runs batted in; SB = Stolen bases; BB = Walks; AVG = Batting average; SLG = Slugging average

Player	G	AB	R	H	2B	3B	HR	RBI	SB	BB	AVG	SLG
Xavier Edwards	139	561	75	159	20	5	3	43	27	49	.283	.353
Otto Lopez	143	544	66	134	21	0	15	77	15	44	.246	.368
Agustín Ramírez	136	537	72	124	33	1	21	67	16	36	.231	.413
Eric Wagaman	140	476	56	119	28	3	9	53	4	32	.250	.378
Kyle Stowers	117	399	61	115	21	3	25	73	5	48	.288	.544
Liam Hicks	119	332	37	82	13	1	6	45	2	43	.247	.346
Javier Sanoja	118	313	40	76	22	4	6	38	6	19	.243	.396
Connor Norby	88	311	42	78	17	1	8	34	8	18	.251	.389
Dane Myers	106	307	29	72	10	0	6	31	18	23	.235	.326
Jesús Sánchez	86	305	40	78	12	4	10	36	9	29	.256	.420
Heriberto Hernández	87	256	40	68	12	1	10	45	1	31	.266	.438
Jakob Marsee	55	209	28	61	18	3	5	33	14	22	.292	.478
Graham Pauley	62	161	18	36	9	1	4	11	2	21	.224	.366
Nick Fortes	59	129	11	31	6	1	2	10	0	7	.240	.349
Derek Hill	53	127	19	27	6	0	3	10	7	9	.213	.331
Matt Mervis	42	120	15	21	4	0	7	14	0	11	.175	.383
Troy Johnston	44	112	12	31	2	1	4	13	2	8	.277	.420
Griffin Conine	24	79	13	20	7	0	2	8	0	7	.253	.418
Joey Wiemer	27	55	7	13	2	0	3	12	0	2	.236	.436
Maximo Acosta	19	54	7	11	1	0	3	5	1	6	.204	.389
Ronny Simon	19	47	6	11	2	0	0	5	0	7	.234	.277
Jonah Bride	12	40	3	4	0	0	0	2	0	5	.100	.100
Victor Mesa Jr.	16	32	7	6	2	0	1	6	0	5	.188	.344
Jack Winkler	14	16	2	4	2	0	0	0	1	0	.250	.375
Brian Navarreto	8	14	3	4	2	0	1	5	0	0	.286	.643
Rob Brantly	3	7	0	3	0	0	0	1	0	0	.429	.429
Totals	162	5543	709	1388	272	29	154	677	138	482	.250	.393

Source:Baseball Reference

=== Pitching ===
Note: W = Wins; L = Losses; ERA = Earned run average; G = Games pitched; GS = Games started; SV = Saves; IP = Innings pitched; H = Hits allowed; R = Runs allowed; ER = Earned runs allowed; BB = Walks allowed; SO = Strikeouts

Player	W	L	ERA	G	GS	SV	IP	H	R	ER	BB	SO
Sandy Alcántara	11	12	5.36	31	31	0	174.2	165	107	104	57	142
Edward Cabrera	8	7	3.53	26	26	0	137.2	121	60	54	48	150
Janson Junk	6	4	4.17	21	16	1	110.0	112	54	51	13	77
Cal Quantrill	4	10	5.50	24	24	0	109.2	122	69	67	30	82
Eury Pérez	7	6	4.25	20	20	0	95.1	68	47	45	32	105
Valente Bellozo	1	4	4.65	32	6	0	81.1	85	44	42	23	54
Tyler Phillips	2	1	2.78	54	1	4	77.2	65	26	24	24	52
Ronny Henriquez	7	1	2.22	69	0	7	73.0	53	23	18	27	98
Lake Bachar	8	2	3.93	53	1	3	71.0	55	34	31	30	75
Max Meyer	3	5	4.73	12	12	0	64.2	72	39	34	20	68
Calvin Faucher	4	4	3.28	65	0	15	60.1	53	27	22	24	59
Cade Gibson	4	5	2.63	44	1	0	54.2	44	18	16	21	43
Anthony Bender	3	5	2.16	51	0	4	50.0	32	13	12	21	42
Ryan Weathers	2	2	3.99	8	8	0	38.1	37	20	17	12	37
George Soriano	2	0	8.35	24	0	1	36.2	46	36	34	19	36
Josh Simpson	4	2	7.34	31	0	0	30.2	34	28	25	22	36
Adam Mazur	0	4	4.80	6	6	0	30.0	33	21	16	12	19
Connor Gillispie	0	3	8.65	6	6	0	26.0	32	26	25	11	23
Anthony Veneziano	0	0	4.71	24	1	0	21.0	25	11	11	10	20
Jesús Tinoco	2	1	5.12	20	0	4	19.1	17	12	11	8	10
Ryan Gusto	0	3	9.77	3	3	0	15.2	19	17	17	8	10
Michael Petersen	0	0	3.97	11	0	0	11.1	11	8	5	5	12
Luarbert Arias	0	0	11.32	7	0	0	10.1	17	13	13	5	10
Tyler Zuber	0	1	11.70	9	0	0	10.0	14	13	13	6	11
Javier Sanoja	0	0	16.39	8	0	0	9.1	24	17	17	5	1
Freddy Tarnok	1	0	2.45	5	0	1	7.1	1	2	2	4	10
Seth Martinez	0	0	5.40	6	0	0	6.2	4	4	4	3	4
Patrick Monteverde	0	0	9.82	1	0	0	3.2	9	4	4	1	4
Christian Roa	0	0	0.00	2	0	0	3.0	1	0	0	3	3
Xzavion Curry	0	1	6.00	3	0	0	3.0	4	4	2	3	1
Robinson Piña	0	0	9.00	1	0	0	1.0	1	1	1	0	0
Totals	79	83	4.60	162	162	40	1443.1	1376	798	737	507	1294

Source:Baseball Reference

== Farm system ==
Level	Team	League	Manager
Triple-A	Jacksonville Jumbo Shrimp	International League	Harold Craw
Double-A	Pensacola Blue Wahoos	Southern League	Kevin Randel
High-A	Beloit Sky Carp	Midwest League	Angel Espada
Low-A	Jupiter Hammerheads	Florida State League	Nick Weisheipl
Rookie	FCL Marlins	Florida Complex League	Luis Dorante
Rookie	DSL Marlins	Dominican Summer League	Oscar Escobar; Carlos Mota
