= Clayton McCullough =

American baseball manager (born 1979)

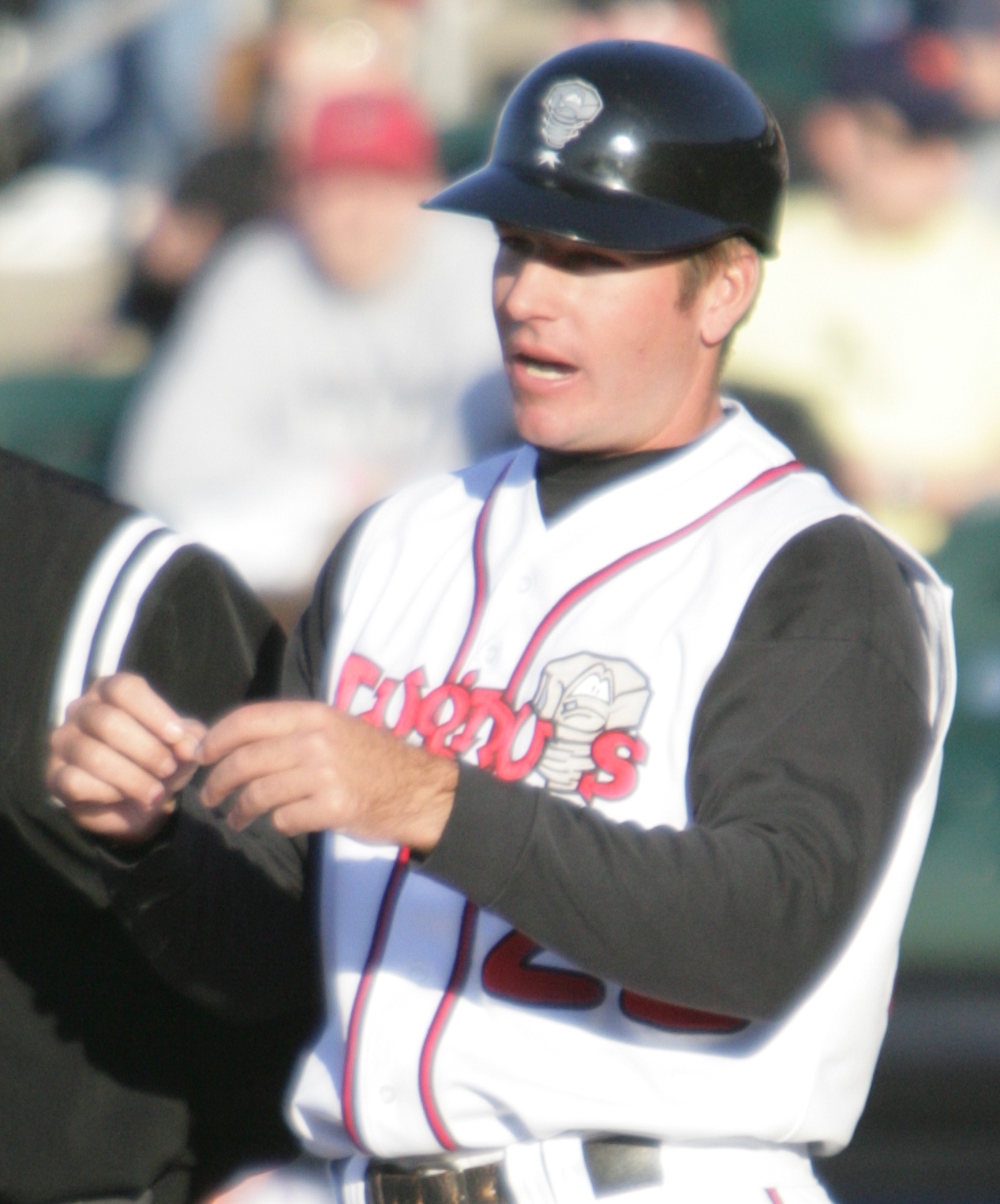
- McCullough with the Lansing Lugnuts in 2009

Miami Marlins – No. 86
- Manager
- Born: December 27, 1979 (age 46); Oxford, North Carolina, U.S.
- Bats: Right Throws: Right

MLB statistics (through August 30, 2026)
- Managerial record: 149–151
- Winning %: .497
- Stats at Baseball Reference
- Managerial record at Baseball Reference

Teams
- As manager: Miami Marlins (2025–present); As coach: Los Angeles Dodgers (2021–2024)

Career highlights and awards
- World Series champion (2024)

Clayton Anthony McCullough (born December 27, 1979) is an American professional baseball coach who currently serves as the manager for the Miami Marlins of Major League Baseball (MLB). He has previously served as a first base coach for the Los Angeles Dodgers.

== Playing career ==
McCullough attended Rose High School in Greenville, North Carolina. He was drafted by the Seattle Mariners in the 47th round of the 1998 MLB draft but did not sign and played college baseball at East Carolina University instead. During his collegiate career for the East Carolina Pirates, he batted .272 with 11 home runs and 82 runs batted in (RBIs) and earned second team All-Colonial Athletic Association honors in his junior year, as well as making a couple of All-Regional teams in three appearances in the NCAA baseball tournament.

The Cleveland Indians selected McCullough in the 22nd round of the 2002 Major League Baseball draft. He played in the Indians' minor league system through 2005, playing for the rookie–level Burlington Indians in 2002, Single–A Lake County Captains in 2003, Lake County and the High–A Kinston Indians in 2004, Kinston, Double–A Akron Aeros and Triple–A Buffalo Bisons in 2005. In 104 games, he had a batting average of .197 with one home run and 25 RBI.

== Coaching career ==
After one season as a volunteer assistant coach for East Carolina, McCullough served as a manager in Minor League Baseball for the Toronto Blue Jays organization from 2007 to 2014, working in the Rookie and Single–A levels and compiling a record of 629–559. before being hired by the Los Angeles Dodgers as their Minor League Field Coordinator in 2015.

The Dodgers named McCullough their major league first base coach prior to the 2021 season. During his tenure as first base coach, he was a member of the World Series-winning Dodgers squad of 2024. Beyond his work at first base, McCollough also was the team's lead outfield coach and responsible for base stealing strategy.

In 2024, he developed a helmet head bump ritual with Dodgers star Shohei Ohtani. After McCullough was hired by the Marlins after the 2024 season, Ohtani gave him an autographed painting of the two doing the first base head bump.

== Managerial career ==
On November 11, 2024, McCullough was named the manager of the Miami Marlins. He became the 17th manager in Marlins franchise history.

In his first season at the helm of the Marlins, McCullough led the team to a 79-83 record. Prior to the 2025 season, the team was projected to lose 100 games. Although the Marlins did not finish with a winning record, the team had a better than expected season and remained in the playoff race into September.

Those results earned him five second-place votes and seven third-place votes for National League Manager of the Year. He finished fifth overall in the voting.

In an April series at Dodger Stadium, players from the Dodgers came onto the field to present McCullough with his 2024 World Series ring and gold-trimmed Dodgers jersey. When Ohtani came to bat for the first time against the Marlins, he tipped his cap to McCullough to acknowledge his former coach.

In July, he earned his first ejection as manager for arguing an interference call at first base.

On July 5, 2026, McCullough controversially pulled starting pitcher Eury Perez in a game against the Athletics after Perez had already pitched 7 perfect innings, and was 6 outs away from a perfect game. The Marlins had a 8-0 lead at that time against A’s, but almost lost the game, winning by the score of 9-8.

=== Managerial record ===
Team	Year	Regular season					Postseason			
Team	Year	Games	Won	Lost	Win %	Finish	Won	Lost	Win %	Result
MIA	2025	162	79	83	.488	3rd in NL East	–	–	–	–
MIA	2026	162	80	82	.494	3rd in NL East	–	–	–	–
Total		324	159	165	.491					

== Personal life ==
McCullough lives in Jupiter, FL with his wife Jill and their three kids.

Sporting positions
Preceded by George Lombard	Los Angeles Dodgers first base coach 2021–2024	Succeeded by Chris Woodward
