= Jake Burger =

American baseball player (born 1996)

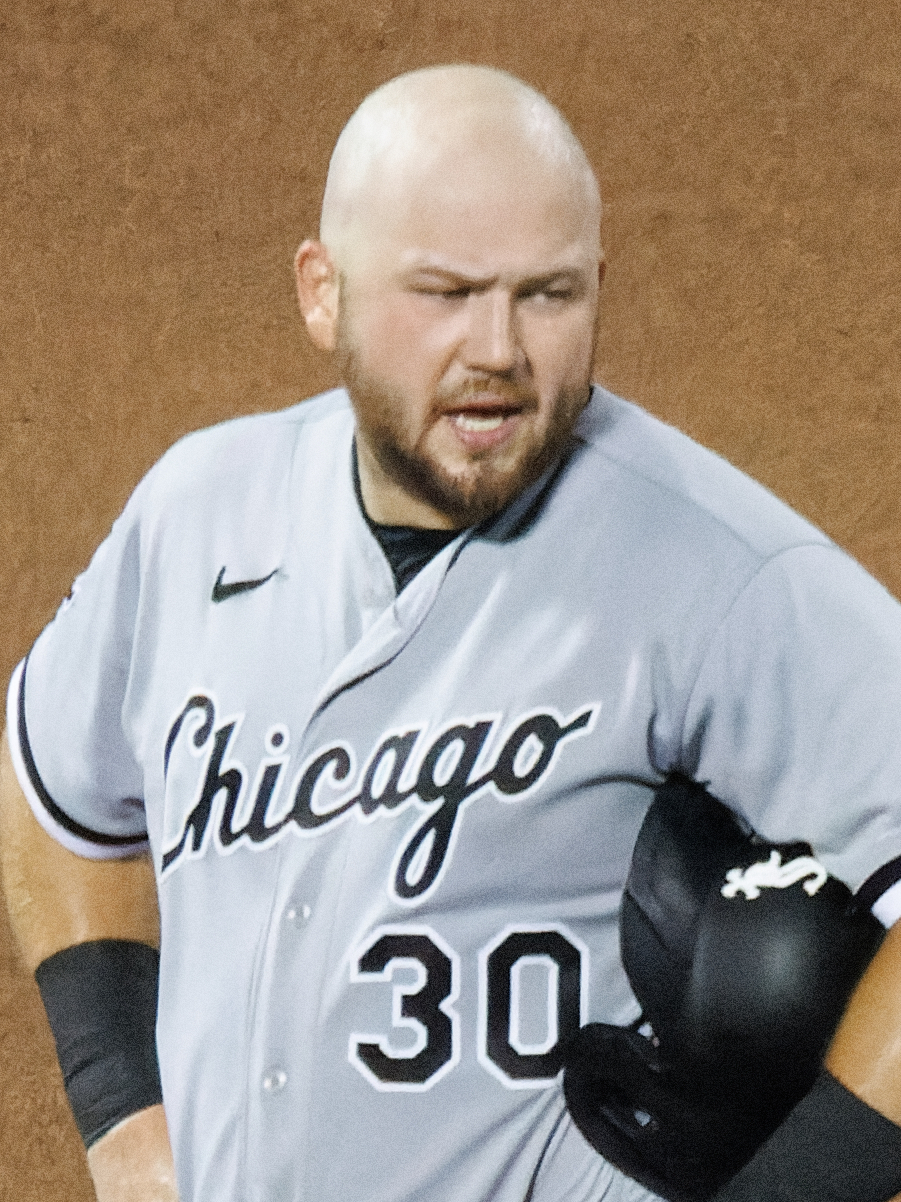
- Burger with the White Sox in 2023

Texas Rangers – No. 21
- Third baseman, First baseman
- Born: April 10, 1996 (age 30); St. Louis, Missouri, U.S.
- Bats: Right Throws: Right

MLB debut
- July 2, 2021, for the Chicago White Sox

MLB statistics (through 2026 season)
- Batting average: .242
- Home runs: 116
- Runs batted in: 328
- Stats at Baseball Reference

Teams
- Chicago White Sox (2021–2023); Miami Marlins (2023–2024); Texas Rangers (2025–present)

Jacob Michael Burger (born April 10, 1996) is an American professional baseball third baseman and first baseman for the Texas Rangers of Major League Baseball (MLB). He has previously played in MLB for the Chicago White Sox and Miami Marlins.

Burger played college baseball at Missouri State University. He was selected by the White Sox in the first round of the 2017 MLB draft, and made his MLB debut in 2021. The White Sox traded Burger to the Marlins at the 2023 trade deadline, and the Marlins traded him to the Rangers during the 2024 Winter Meetings.

== Amateur career ==
Burger attended Christian Brothers College High School in Town and Country, Missouri. He was not drafted out of high school, and played college baseball at Missouri State University for the Missouri State Bears. As a freshman, he played in 57 games, hitting .342/.390/.518 with four home runs and 42 runs batted in (RBIs) and was named the Missouri Valley Conference Freshman of the Year. As a sophomore in 2016, Burger hit .349/.420/.689 with 21 home runs and 72 RBIs over 56 games. After the season, he played for the United States collegiate national team. As a junior in 2017, he batted .328 with 22 home runs and 65 RBIs and was named the Missouri Valley Conference Player of the Year.

== Professional career ==
=== Chicago White Sox ===
Burger was considered one of the top prospects for the 2017 Major League Baseball draft. The Chicago White Sox selected him in the first round, with the 11th overall selection. He signed, and was assigned to the Arizona League White Sox. He was promoted to the Kannapolis Intimidators after four games. He finished 2017 with a .263 batting average, five home runs, and 29 RBIs in 51 games between both clubs.

Burger was invited to 2018 spring training by the White Sox. On February 26, he suffered a ruptured achilles tendon in his left leg, and was ruled out for the entire 2018 season on February 27. In 2019, he missed time during the season due to a bruised heel.

In 2020, Burger participated in the CarShield Collegiate league, a collegiate summer league in O'Fallon, Missouri, because there was no minor league season due to the COVID-19 pandemic. It was his first time playing competitive baseball since 2017. When the summer league ended, Burger was invited to the White Sox alternate training site.

On November 20, 2020, Burger was added to the 40-man roster. He was assigned to Triple-A Charlotte Knights to begin the 2021 season. Following a season-ending injury to Nick Madrigal, Burger began taking reps at second base in Charlotte. In June 2021, Burger was selected to play in the All-Star Futures Game. On July 2, after hitting .322 in Charlotte, Burger was promoted to the major leagues for the first time. He made his MLB debut that day as the starting third baseman against the Detroit Tigers. In the game, he also notched his first career hit, a double off of Tigers reliever Erasmo Ramírez. On July 17, Burger hit his first career home run, a two-run shot off of Houston Astros pitcher Austin Pruitt.

In 2022, Burger was added to the White Sox Opening Day roster and played third base for Yoán Moncada who was injured. Burger played in 21 games with a .239 average hitting two home runs and seven RBIs before he was sent back to Triple-A on May 9 when Moncada was activated.

Burger began the 2023 season with Charlotte. The White Sox promoted him to the major leagues on April 5 when Eloy Jiménez went on the injured list. With Moncada seeing regular playing time at third base and Jiménez being used as the main designated hitter, Burger began getting reps at second base. On June 4, Burger hit a walk-off grand slam against the Detroit Tigers.

=== Miami Marlins ===
On August 1, 2023, the White Sox traded Burger to the Miami Marlins in exchange for pitching prospect Jake Eder. In 53 games for Miami, he batted .303/.355/.505 with nine home runs and 28 RBI.

Over the remainder of 2023 and into 2024, the Marlins began to increasingly play him at first base, while still using him at third base and DH, but no longer using him at second base. Burger made 137 plate appearances for the Marlins in 2024, slashing .250/.301/.460 with 29 home runs and 76 RBI; he struggled against lefties, batting .221/.260/.419.

=== Texas Rangers ===
On December 11, 2024, the Marlins traded Burger to the Texas Rangers in exchange for prospects Echedry Vargas, Max Acosta, and Brayan Mendoza. Before the 2025 season began, he changed his number to 21 in honor of his daughter who has Down syndrome. In 103 appearances for Texas, Burger batted .236/.269/.419 with 16 home runs and 53 RBI. On September 29, 2025, it was announced that Burger would require surgery to repair a tendon sheath in his left wrist.

== Personal life ==
Burger's parents are Mike and Shannon. As children, Burger and his sister frequently attended St. Louis Cardinals games with their father and grandfather. Burger is married to Ashlyn. The couple have a son and daughter who was born with Down syndrome. Burger is a Catholic.
