= Connor Gillispie =

American baseball player (born 1997)

Philadelphia Phillies
- Pitcher
- Born: November 10, 1997 (age 29); Earlysville, Virginia, U.S.
- Bats: Right Throws: Right

MLB debut
- August 4, 2024, for the Cleveland Guardians

MLB statistics (through 2025 season)
- Win–loss record: 0–3
- Earned run average: 7.15
- Strikeouts: 31
- Stats at Baseball Reference

Teams
- Cleveland Guardians (2024); Miami Marlins (2025)

Connor Brammer Gillispie (born November 10, 1997) is an American professional baseball pitcher in the Philadelphia Phillies organization. He has previously played in Major League Baseball (MLB) for the Cleveland Guardians and Miami Marlins. He made his MLB debut in 2024.

== Career ==
=== Amateur career ===
Gillispie attended the Miller School of Albemarle in Charlottesville, Virginia. He enrolled at Virginia Commonwealth University (VCU) and played college baseball for the VCU Rams.

=== Baltimore Orioles ===
The Baltimore Orioles selected Gillispie in the ninth round, with the 258th overall selection, of the 2019 Major League Baseball draft. He made his professional debut with the Low–A Aberdeen IronBirds, recording a 1.77 ERA with 21 strikeouts over 14 appearances. Gillispie did not play in a game in 2020 due to the cancellation of the minor league season because of the COVID-19 pandemic.

Gillispie returned to Aberdeen in 2021, now a High–A affiliate, and posted a 4–8 record and 4.97 ERA with 78 strikeouts across 21 games (12 starts). He returned to Aberdeen for a third season in 2022, compiling an 8–5 record and 3.79 ERA with 113 strikeouts over 25 appearances (14 starts).

Gillispie spent the 2023 campaign with the Double–A Bowie Baysox. In 27 games (14 starts), he accumulated a 7–4 record and 3.89 ERA with 99 strikeouts and 2 saves across 115 2/3 innings pitched.

=== Cleveland Guardians ===
On December 6, 2023, the Cleveland Guardians selected Gillispie from the Orioles in the minor league phase of the Rule 5 draft. Gillispie began the 2024 season with the Triple-A Columbus Clippers. On August 4, 2024, Gillispie was selected to the 40-man roster and promoted to the major leagues for the first time. In 3 appearances during his rookie campaign, he posted a 2.25 ERA with 8 strikeouts across 8 innings of work. Gillispie was designated for assignment by Cleveland on November 19. On November 22, the Guardians non–tendered Gillispie, making him a free agent.

=== Miami Marlins ===
On November 29, 2024, Gillispie signed a one–year, major league contract with the Atlanta Braves. Gillispie was designated for assignment by the Braves on January 23, 2025.

On January 28, 2025, the Miami Marlins claimed Gillispie off of waivers. After making Miami's Opening Day roster, he made six starts for the team, struggling to an 0-3 record and 8.65 ERA with 23 strikeouts over 26 innings of work. Gillispie was designated for assignment by the Marlins following the promotion of Robinson Piña on June 19.

=== Minnesota Twins ===
On June 23, 2025, Gillispie was claimed off waivers by the Minnesota Twins. In four appearances (three starts) for the Triple-A St. Paul Saints, he struggled to a 1-1 record and 14.49 ERA with six strikeouts across 13 2/3 innings pitched. Gillispie was designated for assignment by the Twins on July 28. He cleared waivers and was sent outright to Triple-A St. Paul on July 30. Gillispie elected free agency following the season on November 6.

=== Philadelphia Phillies ===
On February 27, 2026, Gillispie signed a minor league contract with the Philadelphia Phillies. On May 2, he was placed on the full-season injured list ruling him out for the remainder of the season due to an elbow injury after 4 games (2 starts) throwing 17.1 innings going 3-1 with a 3.63 ERA and 18 strikeouts.

On October 21, 2026, Gilliespie re-signed with the Phillies on a new minor league contract for the 2027 season.

== See also ==
- Rule 5 draft results
