= Luarbert Arias =

Venezuelan baseball player (born 2000)

Free agent
- Pitcher
- Born: December 12, 2000 (age 25); Maracay, Venezuela
- Bats: Right Throws: Right

MLB debut
- March 31, 2025, for the Miami Marlins

MLB statistics (through 2025 season)
- Win–loss record: 0–0
- Earned run average: 11.32
- Strikeouts: 10
- Stats at Baseball Reference

Teams
- Miami Marlins (2025)

Luarbert Elias Arias (born December 12, 2000) is a Venezuelan professional baseball pitcher who is a free agent. He made his Major League Baseball (MLB) debut with the Miami Marlins in 2025.

== Career ==
=== San Diego Padres ===
On July 2, 2017, Arias signed with the San Diego Padres as an international free agent. He made his professional debut in 2018 with the rookie-level Arizona League Padres. Arias split 2019 between the AZL Padres and the Low-A Tri-City Dust Devils, posting a cumulative 5-1 record and 3.51 ERA with 64 strikeouts in 56 1/3 innings pitched across 13 games (9 starts). He did not play in a game in 2020 due to the cancellation of the minor league season because of the COVID-19 pandemic.

Arias returned to action in 2021 with the rookie-level Arizona Complex League Padres and Single-A Lake Elsinore Storm. In 21 appearances split between the two affiliates, he compiled a 1-1 record and 3.86 ERA with 57 strikeouts across 32 2/3 innings pitched.

=== Miami Marlins ===
On December 8, 2021, the Miami Marlins selected Arias from the Padres in the minor league phase of the Rule 5 draft. He split the 2022 campaign between the Single-A Jupiter Hammerheads and High-A Beloit Snappers. In 29 appearances for the two affiliates, Arias posted an aggregate 4-1 record and 3.41 ERA with 72 strikeouts over 58 innings of work.

Arias split the 2023 season between Beloit and the Double-A Pensacola Blue Wahoos. In 39 appearances out of the bullpen for the two affiliates, he registered a 4-2 record and 1.84 ERA with 78 strikeouts and five saves across 58 2/3 innings pitched. Arias spent the 2024 campaign with the Triple-A Jacksonville Jumbo Shrimp. In 44 appearances, he compiled an 8–6 record and 3.04 ERA with 75 strikeouts across 68 innings pitched. On November 4, 2024, the Marlins added Arias to their 40-man roster to prevent him from reaching minor league free agency.

Arias was optioned to Triple-A Jacksonville to begin the 2025 season. On March 30, 2025, Arias was promoted to the major leagues for the first time. He made his debut a day later, in which he became the first pitcher in Marlins history to pitch at least three innings without allowing a base runner. In six appearances for Miami, Arias struggled to a 10.61 ERA with nine strikeouts across 9 1/3 innings pitched. Arias was designated for assignment following the promotion of Freddy Tarnok on June 15. He cleared waivers and was sent outright to Triple-A Jacksonville on June 19. On September 1, the Marlins selected Arias' contract, adding him back to their active roster. He made one appearance for Miami two days later, allowing two runs in one inning against the Washington Nationals. Arias was designated for assignment by the Marlins on September 5. He cleared waivers and was sent outright to Jacksonville on September 7. Arias elected free agency on October 3.

=== El Águila de Veracruz ===
On February 17, 2026, Arias signed with El Águila de Veracruz of the Mexican League. He was released prior to the start of the season.

== See also ==
- Rule 5 draft results
