= Ronny Simon =

Dominican baseball player (born 2000)

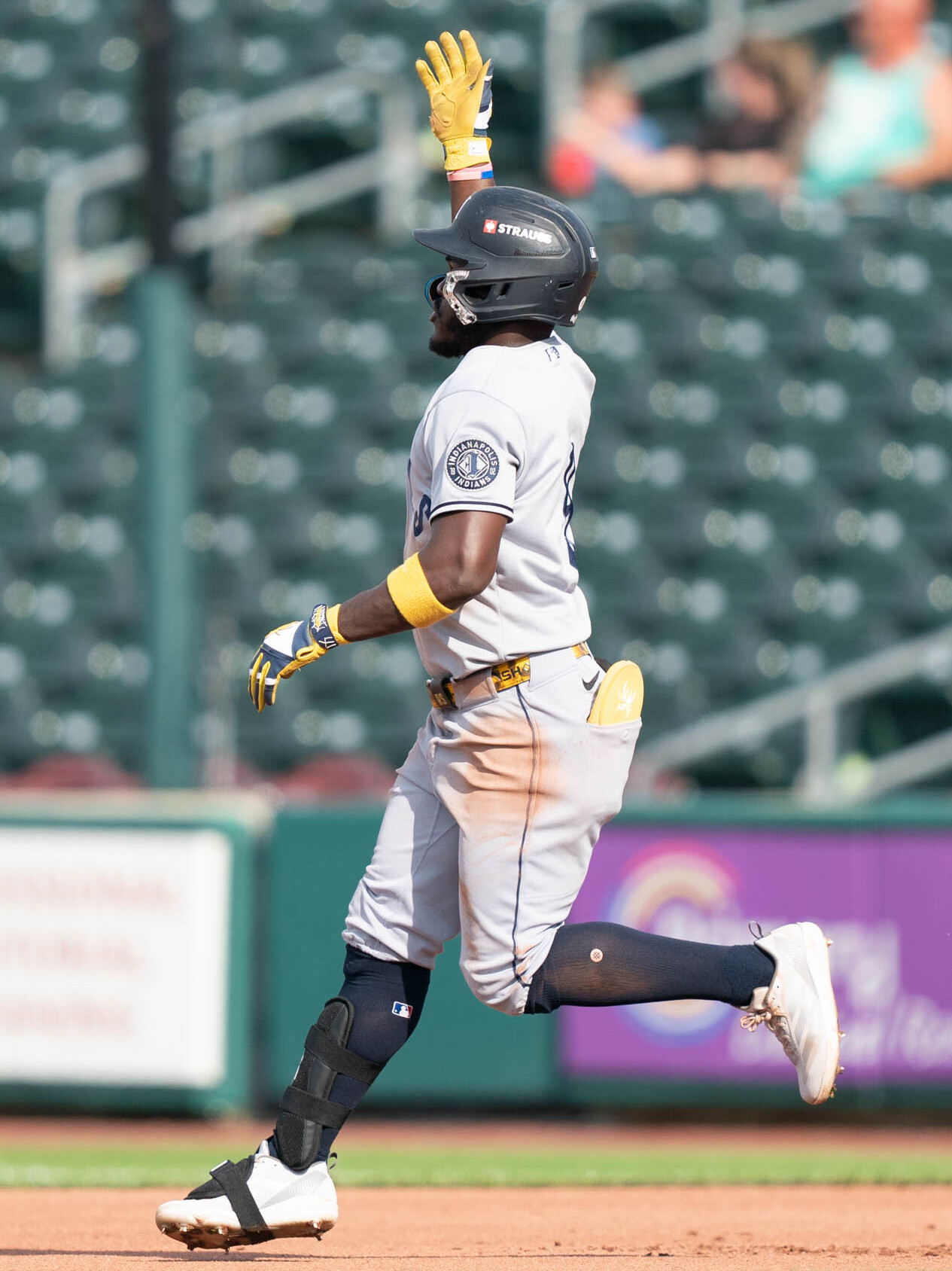
- Simon with the Indianapolis Indians in 2026

Pittsburgh Pirates – No. 63
- Infielder / Outfielder
- Born: April 17, 2000 (age 26); La Romana, Dominican Republic
- Bats: Switch Throws: Right

MLB debut
- April 21, 2025, for the Miami Marlins

MLB statistics (through 2026 season)
- Batting average: .243
- Home runs: 1
- Runs batted in: 11
- Stats at Baseball Reference

Teams
- Miami Marlins (2025); Pittsburgh Pirates (2025–present)

Ronny Oliver Simon (born April 17, 2000) is a Dominican professional baseball infielder and outfielder for the Pittsburgh Pirates of Major League Baseball. He has previously played in MLB for the Miami Marlins. He made his MLB debut in 2025.

== Career ==
=== Chicago Cubs ===
On July 7, 2018, Simon signed with the Chicago Cubs as an international free agent. He made his professional debut with the Dominican Summer League Cubs, hitting .185 in 25 games.

Simon returned to the DSL Cubs in 2019, playing in 54 games and slashing .333/.412/.571 with three home runs, 28 RBI, and 14 stolen bases. He did not play in a game in 2020 due to the cancellation of the minor league season because of the COVID-19 pandemic.

=== Arizona Diamondbacks ===
On November 5, 2020, Simon was traded to the Arizona Diamondbacks as the player to be named later from a previous trade that sent Andrew Chafin to the Cubs. He split the 2021 campaign between the Single-A Visalia Rawhide and High-A Hillsboro Hops, playing in 97 games and batting .245/.329/.454 with 17 home runs, 63 RBI, and 19 stolen bases.

=== Tampa Bay Rays ===
On November 26, 2021, Simon was traded to the Tampa Bay Rays in exchange for Jordan Luplow. He split the 2022 campaign between the High-A Bowling Green Hot Rods and Double-A Montgomery Biscuits, playing in 109 total games and hitting .260/.303/.479 with 22 home runs, 76 RBI, and 34 stolen bases in 42 attempts.

Simon made 128 appearances split between Montgomery and the Triple-A Durham Bulls during the 2023 season, slashing a cumulative .250/.337/.400 with 13 home runs, 56 RBI, and 31 stolen bases. Simon made 130 appearances for the Triple-A Durham in 2024, batting .283/.356/.429 with 10 home runs, 56 RBI, and 20 stolen bases. He elected free agency following the season on November 4, 2024.

=== Miami Marlins ===
On November 13, 2024, Simon signed a minor league contract with the Miami Marlins organization. He was assigned to the Triple-A Jacksonville Jumbo Shrimp to begin the season.

On April 20, 2025, Simon was selected to the 40-man roster and promoted to the major leagues for the first time. He made his MLB debut the next day, recording an RBI single for his first career hit against Nick Lodolo of the Cincinnati Reds. In 19 appearances for Miami, Simon batted .234/.327/.277 with five RBI and seven walks. Simon was designated for assignment following the promotions of Heriberto Hernández and Jack Winkler on May 30.

=== Pittsburgh Pirates ===
On June 2, 2025, Simon was claimed off waivers by the Pittsburgh Pirates. He made eight appearances for Pittsburgh, going 7-for-30 (.233) with two RBI and one stolen base. On August 30, Simon was placed on the injured list due to a dislocated left shoulder. He was transferred to the 60-day injured list on September 23, officially ending his season. Simon was designated for assignment by the Pirates on November 18. On November 21, he was non-tendered by Pittsburgh and became a free agent. On November 24, Simon re-signed with the Pirates on a minor league contract.

Simon was assigned to Triple–A Indianapolis to begin the 2026 campaign. On August 5, 2026, the Pirates selected Simon's contract, adding him to their active roster. On September 19, Simon hit his first major league home run.
