= Maximo Acosta =

Venezuelan baseball player (born 2002)

Miami Marlins – No. 24
- Infielder
- Born: October 29, 2002 (age 23); Caracas, Venezuela
- Bats: Right Throws: Right

MLB debut
- August 18, 2025, for the Miami Marlins

MLB statistics (through 2025 season)
- Batting average: .204
- Home runs: 3
- Runs batted in: 5
- Stats at Baseball Reference

Teams
- Miami Marlins (2025)

Máximo Douglas José Acosta (born October 29, 2002) is a Venezuelan professional baseball infielder for the Miami Marlins of Major League Baseball (MLB). He made his MLB debut in 2025.

== Career ==
=== Texas Rangers ===
Acosta signed with the Texas Rangers as an international free agent on July 2, 2019, for a $1.65 million signing bonus. He did not play in 2020 due to the cancellation of the minor league season because of the COVID-19 pandemic.

Acosta made his professional debut in 2021 with the Arizona Complex League Rangers of the Rookie-level Arizona Complex League, hitting .246/.279/.393 with one home run, five RBI, and seven stolen bases. He appeared in just 17 games before being shut down and having surgery to alleviate thoracic outlet syndrome on August 25, 2021. He spent the 2022 season with the Down East Wood Ducks of the Low-A Carolina League, hitting .262/.341/.361 with four home runs, 35 RBI, and 44 stolen bases. Acosta spent the 2023 season with the Hickory Crawdads of the High-A South Atlantic League, hitting .260/.312/.390 with 11 home runs, 60 RBI, and 26 stolen bases.

Acosta spent 2024 with the Double-A Frisco RoughRiders, playing in 104 games and slashing .288/.353/.425 with eight home runs, 58 RBI, and 26 stolen bases. Following the season, the Rangers added Acosta to their 40-man roster to protect him from the Rule 5 draft.

=== Miami Marlins ===
On December 11, 2024, the Rangers traded Acosta, Echedry Vargas, and Brayan Mendoza to the Miami Marlins in exchange for Jake Burger. Acosta was optioned to the Triple-A Jacksonville Jumbo Shrimp to begin the 2025 season, where he batted .232/.319/.376 with 12 home runs, 49 RBI, and 28 stolen bases over 106 appearances. On August 18, 2025, Acosta was promoted to the major leagues for the first time. On August 20 he recorded his first hit in the majors, a home run off St. Louis Cardinals righty Andre Pallante.

On June 5, 2026, it was announced that Acosta had recently undergone surgery to address a UCL sprain in his right thumb, ruling him out for 8-to-10 weeks.
