= Jesús Tinoco =

Venezuelan baseball player (born 1995)

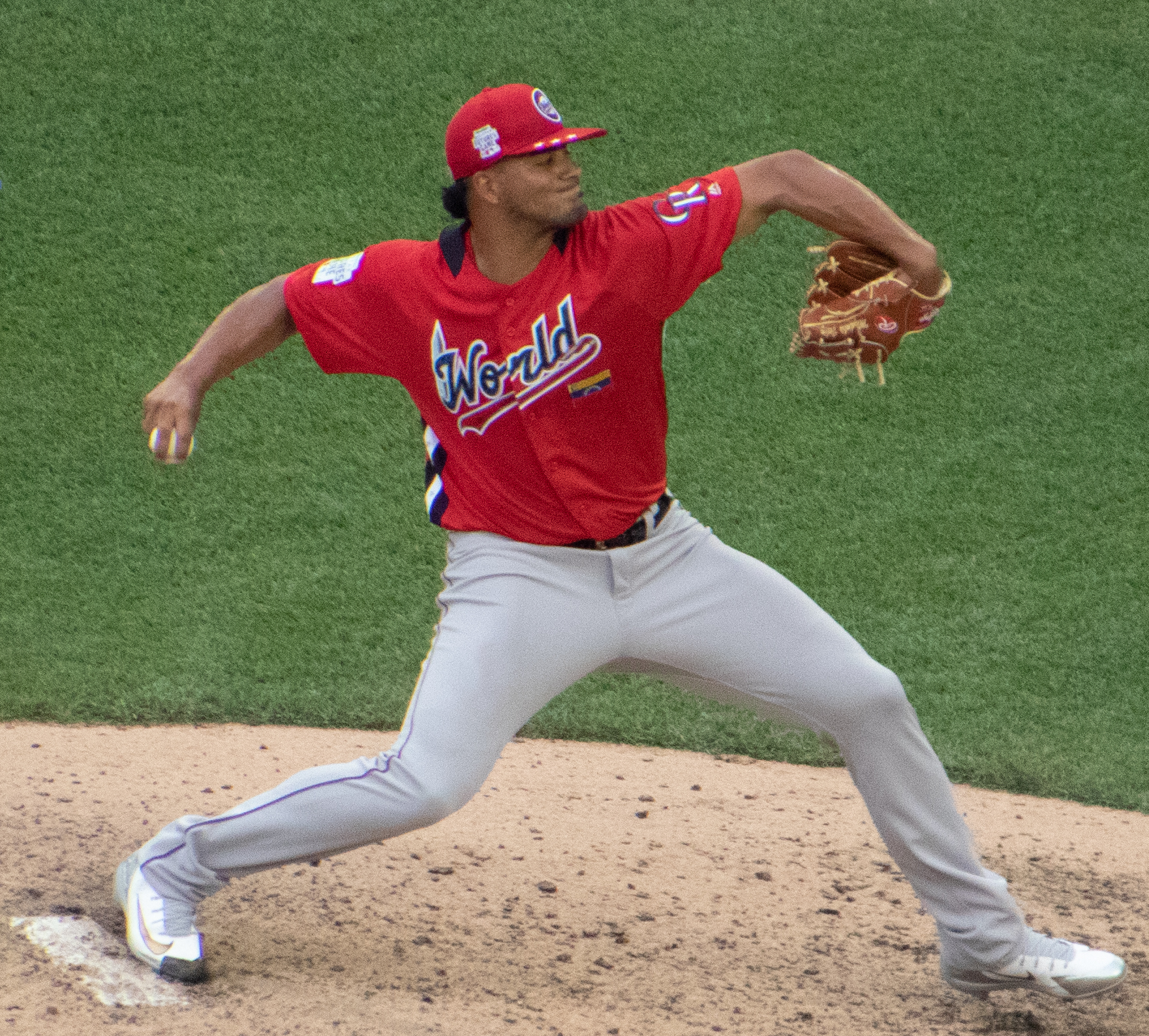
- Tinoco in the 2018 All-Star Futures Game

Miami Marlins
- Pitcher
- Born: April 30, 1995 (age 31); San Antonio de Maturín, Monagas, Venezuela
- Bats: Right Throws: Right

Professional debut
- MLB: May 31, 2019, for the Colorado Rockies
- NPB: March 31, 2023, for the Saitama Seibu Lions

MLB statistics (through 2025 season)
- Win–loss record: 3–4
- Earned run average: 3.98
- Strikeouts: 104

NPB statistics (through 2023 season)
- Win–loss record: 0–3
- Earned run average: 2.83
- Strikeouts: 29
- Stats at Baseball Reference

Teams
- Colorado Rockies (2019); Miami Marlins (2020); Colorado Rockies (2020–2021); Texas Rangers (2022); Saitama Seibu Lions (2023); Texas Rangers (2024); Chicago Cubs (2024); Miami Marlins (2024–2025)

Jesús Rafael Tinoco (born April 30, 1995) is a Venezuelan professional baseball pitcher in the Miami Marlins organization. He has previously played in Major League Baseball (MLB) for the Colorado Rockies, Texas Rangers, and Chicago Cubs, and in Nippon Professional Baseball (NPB) for the Saitama Seibu Lions.

== Career ==
=== Toronto Blue Jays ===
Tinoco signed with the Toronto Blue Jays as an international free agent in September 2011. He made his professional debut in 2012 with the DSL Blue Jays where he was 0-4 with a 4.14 ERA in 12 games (seven starts). He also played in two games for the GCL Blue Jays at the end of the season. In 2013, he played for the GCL Blue Jays where he compiled a 0-5 record and 5.09 ERA in 12 games (nine starts) and in 2014 he pitched with the Bluefield Blue Jays where he was 1-9 with a 4.95 ERA in 13 games (12 starts). Tinoco began 2015 with the Lansing Lugnuts.

=== Colorado Rockies ===
On July 28, 2015, the Blue Jays traded him, along with José Reyes, Miguel Castro and Jeff Hoffman to the Colorado Rockies for Troy Tulowitzki and LaTroy Hawkins. Colorado assigned him to the Asheville Tourists and he finished the season there. In 22 starts between the two teams, he pitched to a 7-6 record and 2.97 ERA. He spent 2016 with Asheville and the Modesto Nuts where he compiled a combined 3-11 record and 6.86 ERA in twenty starts and 2017 with the Lancaster JetHawks where he posted an 11-4 record and 4.67 ERA in 24 starts.

The Rockies added him to their 40-man roster after the 2017 season. He spent 2018 with the Hartford Yard Goats, going 9-12 with a 4.79 ERA in 26 starts. He began 2019 with the Albuquerque Isotopes.

On May 31, 2019, he was called up to the major leagues for the first time. In the game that evening, he made his MLB debut pitching a scoreless ninth inning in a win over the Blue Jays, the team that had traded him.

=== Miami Marlins ===
On August 13, 2020, the Rockies traded Tinoco to the Miami Marlins in exchange for Chad Smith. Tinoco was designated for assignment by the Marlins on August 30.

=== Colorado Rockies (second stint) ===
On September 3, 2020, Tinoco was claimed off waivers by the Rockies. On November 20, Tinoco was designated for assignment.

On July 28, 2021, Tinoco's contract was selected by the Rockies.

=== Texas Rangers ===
On December 3, 2021, Tinoco signed a minor league contract with the Texas Rangers. On June 10, 2022, Texas selected Tinoco's contract as a COVID-19 replacement player. He was returned to the minors on June 20. After spending time with the Triple–A Round Rock Express, Tinoco was selected back to the major league roster on September 1. On October 4, Tinoco gave up a home run to Aaron Judge, his 62nd of the season to break the long-standing AL record previously held by Roger Maris. On November 10, Tinoco was removed from the 40-man roster and sent outright to Triple–A; he elected free agency the same day.

=== Saitama Seibu Lions ===
On December 16, 2022, Tinoco signed with the Saitama Seibu Lions of Nippon Professional Baseball. He made 38 appearances for the Lions during the 2023 season, compiling an 0-3 record and 2.83 ERA with 29 strikeouts over 35 innings of work. Tinoco became a free agent following the season.

=== Texas Rangers (second stint) ===
On December 11, 2023, Tinoco signed a minor league contract with the Texas Rangers. In 15 games for the Triple–A Round Rock Express, he logged a 3.80 ERA with 27 strikeouts across 21 1/3 innings pitched. On May 23, 2024, Texas selected Tinoco's contract and promoted him to the active roster. In nine games for the Rangers, he struggled to an 8.10 ERA with nine strikeouts across 10 innings pitched. On June 16, Tinoco was designated for assignment by Texas. He cleared waivers and was sent outright to Round Rock on June 20. However, Tinoco rejected the outright assignment and subsequently elected free agency.

=== Kansas City Royals ===
On June 25, 2024, Tinoco signed a minor league contract with the Kansas City Royals. In 6 games for the Triple–A Omaha Storm Chasers, he compiled a 4.05 ERA with 10 strikeouts across 6 2/3 innings pitched.

=== Chicago Cubs ===
On July 16, 2024, Tinoco was traded to the Chicago Cubs in exchange for cash considerations. The Cubs purchased his contract on July 19, adding him to their major league roster. Tinoco made two scoreless appearances for Chicago before he was designated for assignment on July 27.

=== Miami Marlins (second stint) ===
On July 30, 2024, Tinoco was claimed off waivers by the Miami Marlins. In 21 appearances down the stretch, he logged a 1-0 record and 2.03 ERA with 30 strikeouts and three saves across 26 2/3 innings pitched.

In 20 appearances to begin the 2025 season, Tinoco posted a 5.12 ERA with four saves and 10 strikeouts. On June 6, 2025, Tinoco was placed on the injured list with a right forearm strain. He was transferred to the 60-day injured list on July 16. On August 22, it was announced that Tinoco would require flexor tendon surgery, ruling him out for the remainder of the season, as well as the majority of the 2026 season. On November 5, Tinoco was removed from the 40-man roster and sent outright to Jacksonville. He elected free agency the following day.

On January 5, 2026, Tinoco re-signed with the Marlins organization on a minor league contract. On March 25, he was placed on the full-season injured list officially ending his season without appearing in a game.

== See also ==
- List of Major League Baseball players from Venezuela
