= Robinson Piña =

Dominican baseball player (born 1998)

Free agent
- Pitcher
- Born: November 26, 1998 (age 27); San Cristóbal, Dominican Republic
- Bats: Right Throws: Right

MLB debut
- June 20, 2025, for the Miami Marlins

MLB statistics (through 2025 season)
- Win–loss record: 0–0
- Earned run average: 7.71
- Strikeouts: 1
- Stats at Baseball Reference

Teams
- Miami Marlins (2025); Toronto Blue Jays (2025)

Robinson Piña (born November 26, 1998) is a Dominican professional baseball pitcher who is a free agent. He has previously played in Major League Baseball (MLB) for the Miami Marlins and Toronto Blue Jays.

== Career ==
=== Los Angeles Angels ===
On February 15, 2017, Piña signed with the Los Angeles Angels as an international free agent. He made his professional debut with the Dominican Summer League Angels, recording a 3.68 ERA with 47 strikeouts over 15 games. Piña split the 2018 season between the DSL Angels, the rookie-level Arizona League Angels, and rookie-level Orem Owlz, registering a combined 4–2 record and 3.48 ERA with 61 strikeouts across 19 appearances. He made 26 appearances (21 starts) for the Single-A Burlington Bees in 2019, logging a 5–8 record and 3.83 ERA with 146 strikeouts over 108 innings of work.

Piña did not play in a game in 2020 due to the cancellation of the minor league season because of the COVID-19 pandemic. He returned to action in 2021 with the Low-A Inland Empire 66ers, High-A Tri-City Dust Devils, and Double-A Rocket City Trash Pandas. In 21 starts for the three affiliates, Piña compiled a 2–10 record and 4.44 ERA with 140 strikeouts across 95 1/3 innings pitched.

Piña split the 2022 season between Tri-City and the Triple-A Salt Lake Bees. In 21 appearances (15 starts) for the two affiliates, he posted an aggregate 6–8 record and 4.43 ERA with 122 strikeouts and one saves across 85 1/3 innings pitched. Piña made 34 appearances (11 starts) split between Tri-City, Rocket City, and Salt Lake, posting a cumulative 5–5 record and 4.07 ERA with 90 strikeouts across 97 1/3 innings pitched. He elected free agency following the season on November 6, 2023.

=== Philadelphia Phillies ===
On December 11, 2023, Piña signed a minor league contract with the Philadelphia Phillies organization. He made 25 starts split between the Double-A Reading Fightin Phils and Triple-A Lehigh Valley IronPigs, logging a 13–8 record and 4.18 ERA with 132 strikeouts across 129 1/3 innings pitched. Piña elected free agency following the season on November 4, 2024.

=== Miami Marlins ===
On November 20, 2024, Piña signed a minor league contract with the Miami Marlins organization. He began the 2025 season with the Triple-A Jacksonville Jumbo Shrimp, pitching to a 4–3 record and 3.47 ERA with 54 strikeouts over 13 appearances (11 starts). On June 19, 2025, the Marlins selected Piña to their 40-man roster and promoted him to the major leagues for the first time. He made his MLB debut the next day against the Atlanta Braves, pitching an inning in relief and yielding a solo home run to Austin Riley. On June 21, Piña was designated for assignment following the promotion of Josh Simpson.

=== Toronto Blue Jays ===
On June 24, 2025, the Marlins traded Piña to the Toronto Blue Jays in exchange for Colby Martin. He made one appearance for the Blue Jays, allowing three runs (one earned) on four hits with one strikeout across 1 1/3 innings pitched against the Chicago White Sox. On August 6, while playing for the Triple-A Buffalo Bisons, Piña was placed on the injured list due to an unspecified injury. He was transferred to the 60-day injured list on September 2, after the injury was diagnosed as a right ulnar collateral ligament sprain. On November 6, Piña was removed from the 40-man roster and sent outright to Buffalo. He elected free agency the same day.
