= Javier Sanoja =

Venezuelan baseball player (born 2002)

Miami Marlins – No. 8
- Utility player
- Born: September 3, 2002 (age 24); Maracay, Venezuela
- Bats: Right Throws: Right

MLB debut
- September 7, 2024, for the Miami Marlins

MLB statistics (through 2026 season)
- Batting average: .272
- Home runs: 17
- Runs batted in: 109
- Stats at Baseball Reference

Teams
- Miami Marlins (2024–present)

Career highlights and awards
- Gold Glove Award (2025)
Medals
Men's baseball
Representing Venezuela
World Baseball Classic
Gold medal – first place	2026 Miami	Team

Javier Ernesto Sanoja (born September 3, 2002) is a Venezuelan professional baseball utility player for the Miami Marlins of Major League Baseball (MLB). He made his MLB debut in 2024.

== Career ==
Sanoja signed with the Miami Marlins as an international free agent on July 2, 2019. He did not play in a game 2020 due to the cancellation of the minor league season because of the COVID-19 pandemic. Sanoja subsequently did not make his professional debut until 2021 with the Dominican Summer League Marlins. In 2022, Sanoja played for the rookie-level Florida Complex League Marlins and Jupiter Hammerheads; in 2023, he split the year between Jupiter and the Beloit Sky Carp.

Sanoja started 2024 with the Double–A Pensacola Blue Wahoos and was promoted to the Triple–A Jacksonville Jumbo Shrimp after 15 games. In 111 games for Jacksonville, he slashed .291/.354/.431 with six home runs, 58 RBI, and 14 stolen bases. On September 7, 2024, Sanoja was selected to the 40-man roster and promoted to the major leagues for the first time. In 15 appearances with the Marlins during his rookie campaign, he batted .229/.250/.286 with two RBI.

On April 20, 2025, Sanoja hit his first career home run, a three-run shot off of Orion Kerkering of the Philadelphia Phillies. On August 27, Sanoja pitched two innings of a blowout loss to the Atlanta Braves; in the appearance, he logged his first career strikeout against Braves infielder Vidal Bruján. In 118 total appearances for Miami, he slashed .243/.287.396 with six home runs, 40 RBI, and six stolen bases. On November 2, Sanoja was awarded his first career Gold Glove Award for the National League utility position.

On March 17, 2026, in the Championship Game of the 2026 World Baseball Classic, Sanoja entered as a pinch-runner in the ninth inning and stole second base. He then scored the winning run for Team Venezuela against Team USA on a double by Eugenio Suárez. Sanoja was inducted into the Venezuelan Baseball Hall of Fame as a member of the 2026 WBC championship team.
