= Anthony Bender =

American baseball player (born 1995)

Miami Marlins – No. 37
- Pitcher
- Born: February 3, 1995 (age 31); Petaluma, California, U.S.
- Bats: Right Throws: Right

MLB debut
- May 5, 2021, for the Miami Marlins

MLB statistics (through 2026 season)
- Win–loss record: 13–13
- Earned run average: 2.97
- Strikeouts: 230
- Stats at Baseball Reference

Teams
- Miami Marlins (2021–2022, 2024–present)

Anthony Wayne Bender (born February 3, 1995) is an American professional baseball pitcher for the Miami Marlins of Major League Baseball (MLB). He played college baseball for Santa Rosa Junior College. He was drafted by the Kansas City Royals with the 613th pick in the 20th round of the 2016 MLB draft. He made his MLB debut in 2021.

== Career ==
=== Kansas City Royals ===
The Kansas City Royals selected Bender in the 20th round, with the 613th overall selection, of the 2016 MLB draft by the Kansas City Royals out of Santa Rosa Junior College. Bender made his professional debut for the rookie-level Arizona League Royals. He split the 2017 season between the Single-A Lexington Legends and High-A Wilmington Blue Rocks, recording a cumulative 5–6 record and 3.96 ERA. He spent the entire 2018 season in Wilmington, recording a 3.57 ERA and 6–3 record in 30 appearances. On March 21, 2019, Bender was released by the Royals.

=== Milwaukee Brewers ===
On April 12, 2019, Bender signed with the Sioux City Explorers of the American Association of Independent Professional Baseball. After pitching 3 2/3 scoreless innings for Sioux City, on May 29, the Milwaukee Brewers signed him to a minor league contract. Bender played for the Single-A Wisconsin Timber Rattlers, the High-A Carolina Mudcats, and the Double-A Biloxi Shuckers, accumulating a 1.49 ERA in 29 appearances. After the minor league season was cancelled in 2020 because of the COVID-19 pandemic, Bender joined the Milwaukee Milkmen of the American Association for the 2020 season. Bender pitched to a 5.48 ERA with 25 strikeouts with the Milkmen in 2020, and won the American Association championship with the club. On November 2, 2020, Bender elected free agency.

=== Miami Marlins ===
On November 30, 2020, Bender signed a minor league contract with the Miami Marlins organization. On May 4, 2021, Bender was selected to the 40-man roster and promoted to the major leagues for the first time. He made his debut the next day, pitching a scoreless inning of relief. In the game, he notched his first MLB strikeout, punching out Arizona Diamondbacks outfielder Tim Locastro. He did not allow an earned run until his 22nd appearance in the majors. He finished his rookie campaign with a 3–2 record and 2.79 ERA with 71 strikeouts across 60 appearances.

In 2022, Bender pitched in 22 games for Miami, recording a 1–3 record and 3.26 ERA with 17 strikeouts and six saves in 19 1/3 innings of work. On August 14, 2022, he was placed on the injured list due to a right elbow strain. On August 30, Bender underwent Tommy John surgery, ending his season prematurely. Bender also missed the entire 2023 season as a result of the procedure.

Bender returned from surgery in 2024, making 59 appearances out of the bullpen for the Marlins; in those games, he posted a 5-2 record and 4.08 ERA with 59 strikeouts and one save over 53 innings of work.

Bender made 51 appearances for Miami during the 2025 season, compiling a 3-5 record and 2.16 ERA with 42 strikeouts over 50 innings of work. On August 19, 2025, it was announced that Bender had suffered a season-ending stress reaction in his right tibia.

Bender made 35 appearances out of the bullpen for the Marlins during the 2026 campaign, posting a 1–1 record and 2.62 ERA with 41 strikeouts and two saves across 34 1/3 innings pitched. On September 18, 2026, it was announced that Bender would undergo season–ending surgery to repair a stress reaction in his right shin.
