= Cade Gibson =

American baseball player (born 1998)

Miami Marlins – No. 58
- Pitcher
- Born: February 18, 1998 (age 28); Ruston, Louisiana, U.S.
- Bats: Left Throws: Left

MLB debut
- April 20, 2025, for the Miami Marlins

MLB statistics (through 2026 season)
- Win–loss record: 10–7
- Earned run average: 3.94
- Strikeouts: 87
- Stats at Baseball Reference

Teams
- Miami Marlins (2025–present)

Caden Michael Gibson (born February 18, 1998) is an American professional baseball pitcher for the Miami Marlins of Major League Baseball (MLB).

== Amateur career ==
Gibson attended Ruston High School in Ruston, Louisiana and played college baseball at Louisiana State University Shreveport and Louisiana Tech University. In 2022 for Louisiana Tech, he made 19 starts and had a 6-4 record with a 4.87 earned run average (ERA).

== Professional career ==
Gibson was drafted by the Miami Marlins in the 10th round, with the 292nd overall selection, of the 2022 Major League Baseball draft. He split his first professional season between the Single-A Jupiter Hammerheads and rookie-level Florida Complex League Marlins.

Gibson split the 2023 campaign between the Single-A Jupiter Hammerheads and High-A Beloit Snappers. In 23 appearances (19 starts) for the two affiliates, he compiled an aggregate 6-10 record and 4.58 ERA with 99 strikeouts over 118 innings of work. Gibson split 2024 between Beloit and the Double-A Pensacola Blue Wahoos, recording a combined 2.23 ERA with 71 strikeouts in 80 2/3 innings pitched across 21 appearances (12 starts).

Gibson was assigned to the Triple-A Jacksonville Jumbo Shrimp to begin the 2025 season. On April 20, 2025, Gibson was promoted to the major leagues for the first time. On June 7, Gibson earned his first career win after tossing a scoreless ninth and tenth inning in an extra-innings victory over the Tampa Bay Rays.

Gibson was optioned to Triple-A Jacksonville to begin the 2026 season.
