= Ronny Henriquez =

Dominican baseball player (born 2000)

Ronny Henríquez
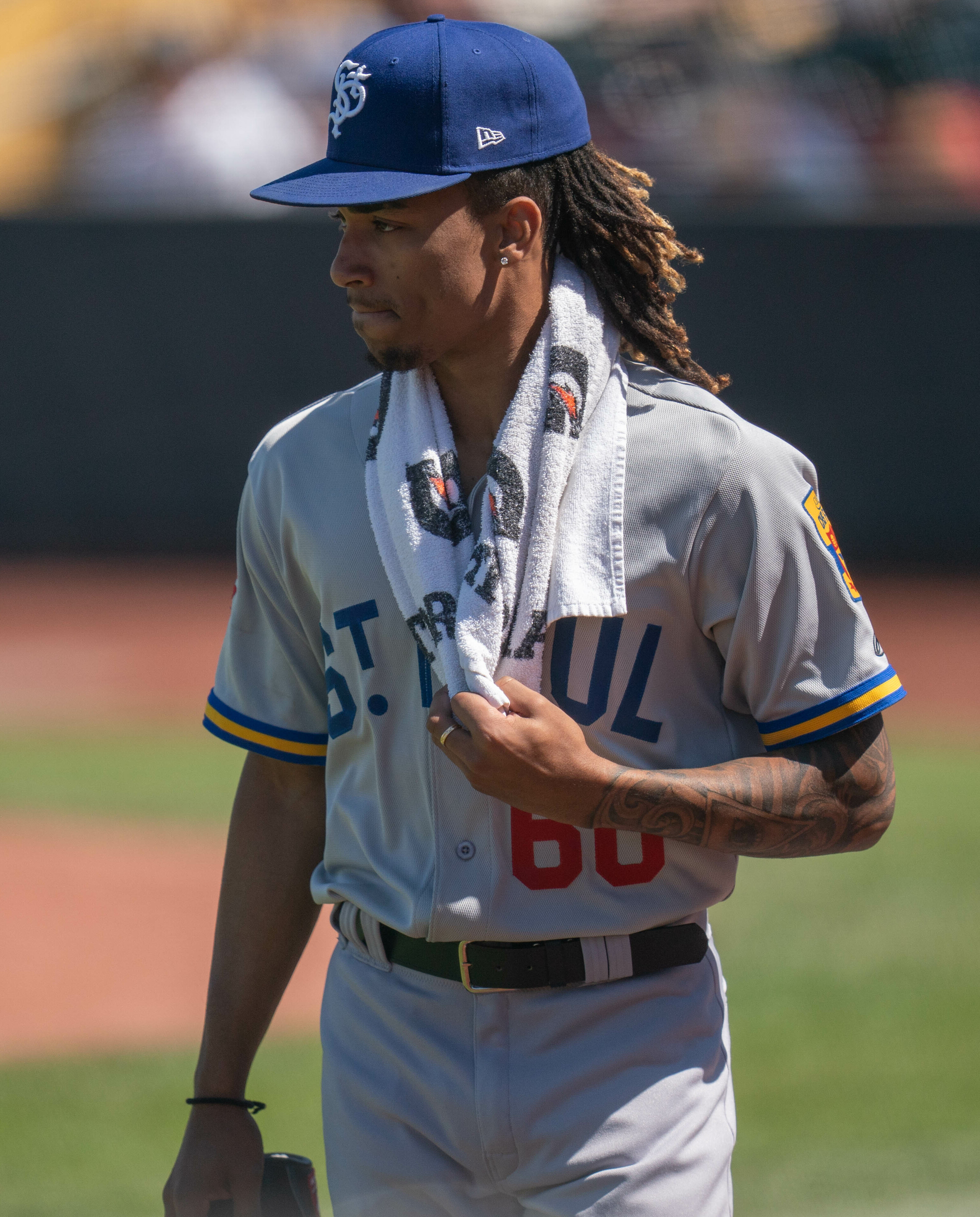
- Henríquez with the St. Paul Saints in 2022

Miami Marlins – No. 32
- Pitcher
- Born: June 20, 2000 (age 26); Bonao, Dominican Republic
- Bats: Right Throws: Right

MLB debut
- September 19, 2022, for the Minnesota Twins

MLB statistics (through 2025 season)
- Win–loss record: 8–3
- Earned run average: 2.42
- Strikeouts: 122
- Stats at Baseball Reference

Teams
- Minnesota Twins (2022, 2024); Miami Marlins (2025)

Ronny Henriquez (born June 20, 2000) is a Dominican professional baseball pitcher for the Miami Marlins of Major League Baseball (MLB). He has previously played in MLB for the Minnesota Twins.

== Career ==
=== Texas Rangers ===
Henríquez signed with the Texas Rangers as an international free agent on July 3, 2017, for a $10,000 signing bonus. Henríquez made his professional debut in 2018 for the DSL Rangers of the Rookie-level Dominican Summer League, going 5–0 with a 1.55 ERA and 79 strikeouts over 58 innings. He played for the Hickory Crawdads of the Single–A South Atlantic League in 2019, going 6–6 with a 4.55 ERA and 99 strikeouts over 82 innings. Henríquez did not play in a game in 2020 due to the cancellation of the Minor League Baseball season because of the COVID-19 pandemic. Henríquez opened the 2021 season with the Hickory Crawdads of the High-A East, going 1–3 with a 3.75 ERA and 27 strikeouts over 24 innings. He was promoted to the Frisco RoughRiders of the Double-A Central on June 10. With Frisco he went 4–4 with a 5.04 ERA and 78 strikeouts over 69 2/3 innings. On November 19, 2021, Texas selected Henríquez to the 40–man roster in order to protect him from the Rule 5 draft.

=== Minnesota Twins ===
On March 12, 2022, Texas traded Henríquez and Isiah Kiner-Falefa to the Minnesota Twins in exchange for Mitch Garver. He was assigned to the Triple–A St. Paul Saints to begin the season, where he made 24 appearances (14 starts) and posted a 5.66 ERA with 106 strikeouts in 95 1/3 innings of work. On September 18, Henríquez was promoted to the major leagues for the first time. He made three appearances for Minnesota, logging a 2.31 ERA with 9 strikeouts across 11 2/3 innings of work.

In 2023, Henríquez was relegated to the minor leagues, spending the season with the Triple–A St. Paul (as well as appearing in two games for the Single–A Fort Myers Miracle. In 37 games out of the bullpen for St. Paul, he registered a 5–3 record and 5.68 ERA with 49 strikeouts in 57 innings pitched. On November 17, 2023, Henríquez was non–tendered by Minnesota and became a free agent. Henríquez re–signed with the Twins on a minor league contract on November 19.

He began the 2024 season back in Triple–A St. Paul, logging a 4.05 ERA across 7 appearances. On April 22, 2024, the Twins selected Henríquez's contract to the major league roster. In 16 appearances for Minnesota, he logged a 1–1 record and 3.26 ERA with 15 strikeouts across 19 1/3 innings pitched. Henríquez was designated for assignment by the Twins on February 7, 2025.

=== Miami Marlins ===
On February 11, 2025, Henriquez was claimed off waivers by the Miami Marlins. He made 69 appearances out of the bullpen, compiling a 7–1 record and 2.22 ERA with 98 strikeouts and seven saves across 73 innings pitched.

On December 22, 2025, Henriquez underwent UCL reconstruction with an internal brace surgery, and was ruled out of the entirety of the 2026 season.

== See also ==
- List of Major League Baseball players from the Dominican Republic
