= Troy Johnston =

American baseball player (born 1997)

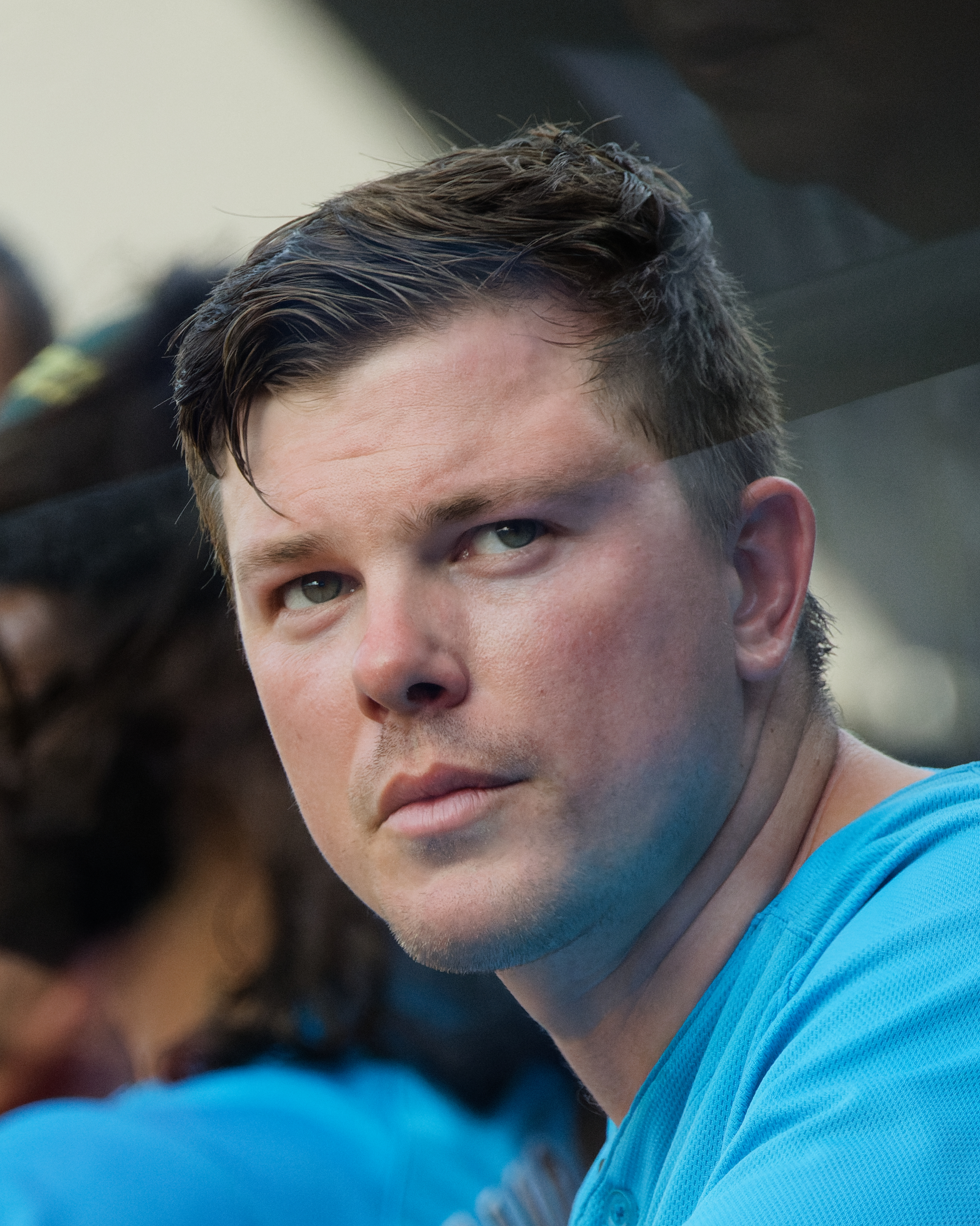
- Johnston with the Marlins in 2023

Colorado Rockies – No. 20
- Outfielder / First baseman
- Born: June 22, 1997 (age 29); Tacoma, Washington, U.S.
- Bats: Left Throws: Left

MLB debut
- July 29, 2025, for the Miami Marlins

MLB statistics (through 2026 season)
- Batting average: .277
- Home runs: 8
- Runs batted in: 63
- Stats at Baseball Reference

Teams
- Miami Marlins (2025); Colorado Rockies (2026–present)

Troy Michael Johnston (born June 22, 1997) is an American professional baseball outfielder and first baseman for the Colorado Rockies of Major League Baseball (MLB). He has previously played in MLB for the Miami Marlins. He made his MLB debut in 2025.

== Career ==
=== Amateur career ===
Johnston attended Governor John R. Rogers High School in Puyallup, Washington, and played college baseball at Gonzaga University

=== Miami Marlins ===
Johnston was drafted by the Miami Marlins in the 17th round (501st overall) of the 2019 Major League Baseball draft. He made his professional debut with the Batavia Muckdogs.

Johnston did not play a in game in 2020 due to the cancellation of the minor league season because of the COVID-19 pandemic. He returned to play for the Jupiter Hammerheads and Beloit Snappers in 2021. After the season, he played in the Arizona Fall League. Johnston started 2022 with the Double-A Pensacola Blue Wahoos.

Johnston began the 2025 season with the Triple-A Jacksonville Jumbo Shrimp, hitting .252/.333/.439 with 12 home runs, 39 RBI, and 31 stolen bases over his first 84 games. On July 29, Johnston was selected to the 40-man roster and promoted the major leagues for the first time. On August 16, Johnston hit his first career home run off of Brayan Bello of the Boston Red Sox.

=== Colorado Rockies ===
On November 5, 2025, Johnston was claimed off waivers by the Colorado Rockies.
