= Brian Navarreto =

Puerto Rican baseball player (born 1994)

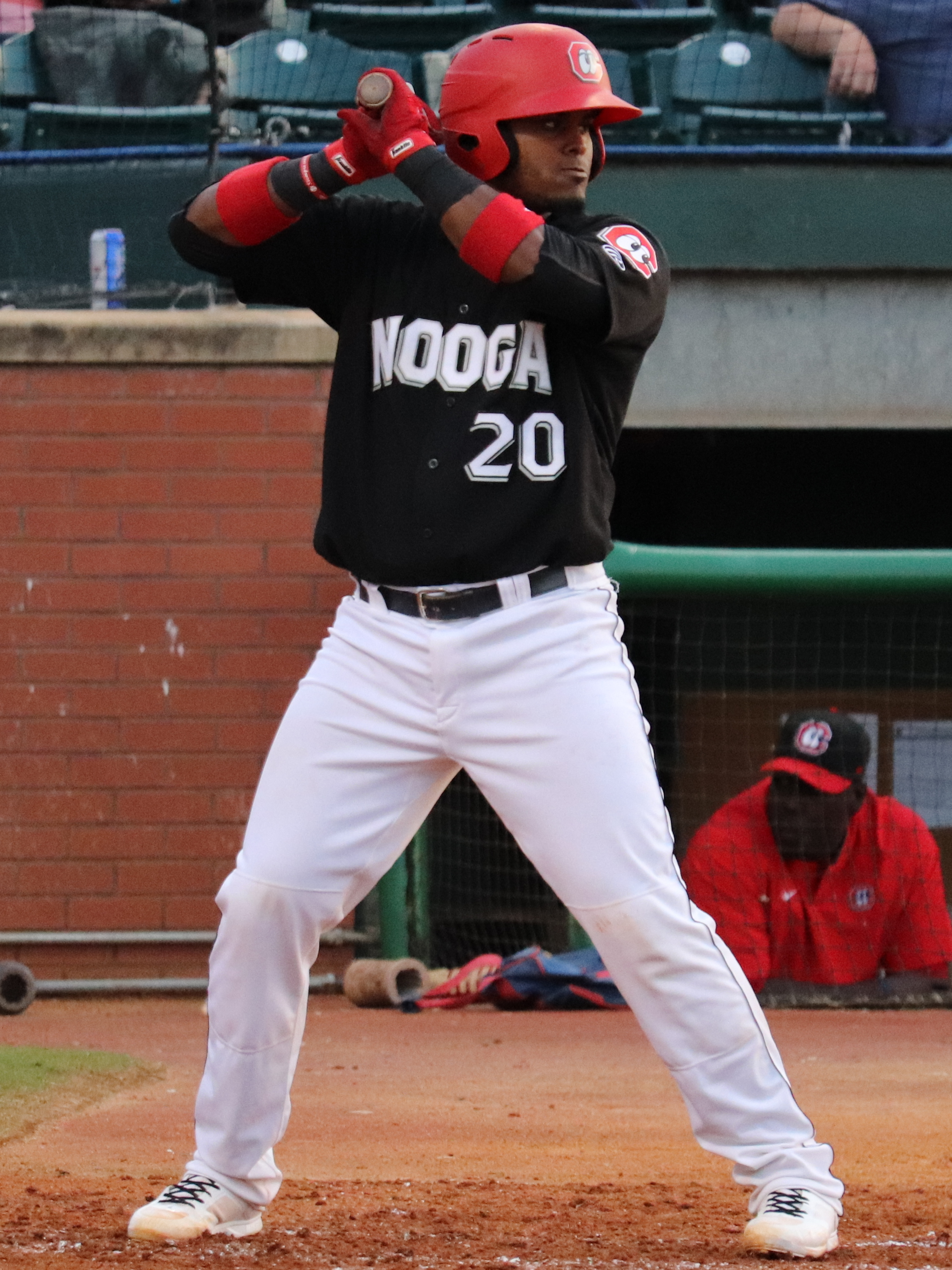
- Navarreto with the Chattanooga Lookouts in 2018

Philadelphia Phillies
- Catcher
- Born: December 29, 1994 (age 31); Bayamón, Puerto Rico
- Bats: Right Throws: Right

MLB debut
- August 23, 2020, for the Miami Marlins

MLB statistics (through 2026 season)
- Batting average: .183
- Home runs: 2
- Runs batted in: 8
- Stats at Baseball Reference

Teams
- Miami Marlins (2020, 2025–2026)

Brian Eduardo Navarreto (born December 29, 1994) is a Puerto Rican professional baseball catcher in the Philadelphia Phillies organization. He has played in Major League Baseball (MLB) for the Miami Marlins.

== Career ==
=== Amateur career ===
Navarreto began playing baseball as a catcher in Little League baseball in Bayamón, Puerto Rico. He attended Arlington Country Day School in Jacksonville, Florida.

=== Minnesota Twins ===
The Minnesota Twins selected Navarreto in the sixth round of the 2013 MLB draft. From 2013 to 2017 in the Twins organization, Navarreto spent time with the Gulf Coast League Twins, Elizabethton Twins, Cedar Rapids Kernels, Fort Myers Miracle, Chattanooga Lookouts, and Pensacola Blue Wahoos. Navarreto was invited to Spring Training with the Twins in 2018 and 2019, but did not make the team either year and spent both seasons in Pensacola.

=== New York Yankees ===
On July 25, 2019, Navarreto was traded to the New York Yankees in exchange for cash considerations. At the time of his trade, Navarreto had hit .215/.265/.308 in his minor league career, but also carried a strong 47% caught stealing rate. Navarreto was assigned to the Double–A Trenton Thunder, and would finish out the season there, hitting .167 with one home run and four RBI over 10 games. He elected free agency following the season on November 4.

=== Miami Marlins ===
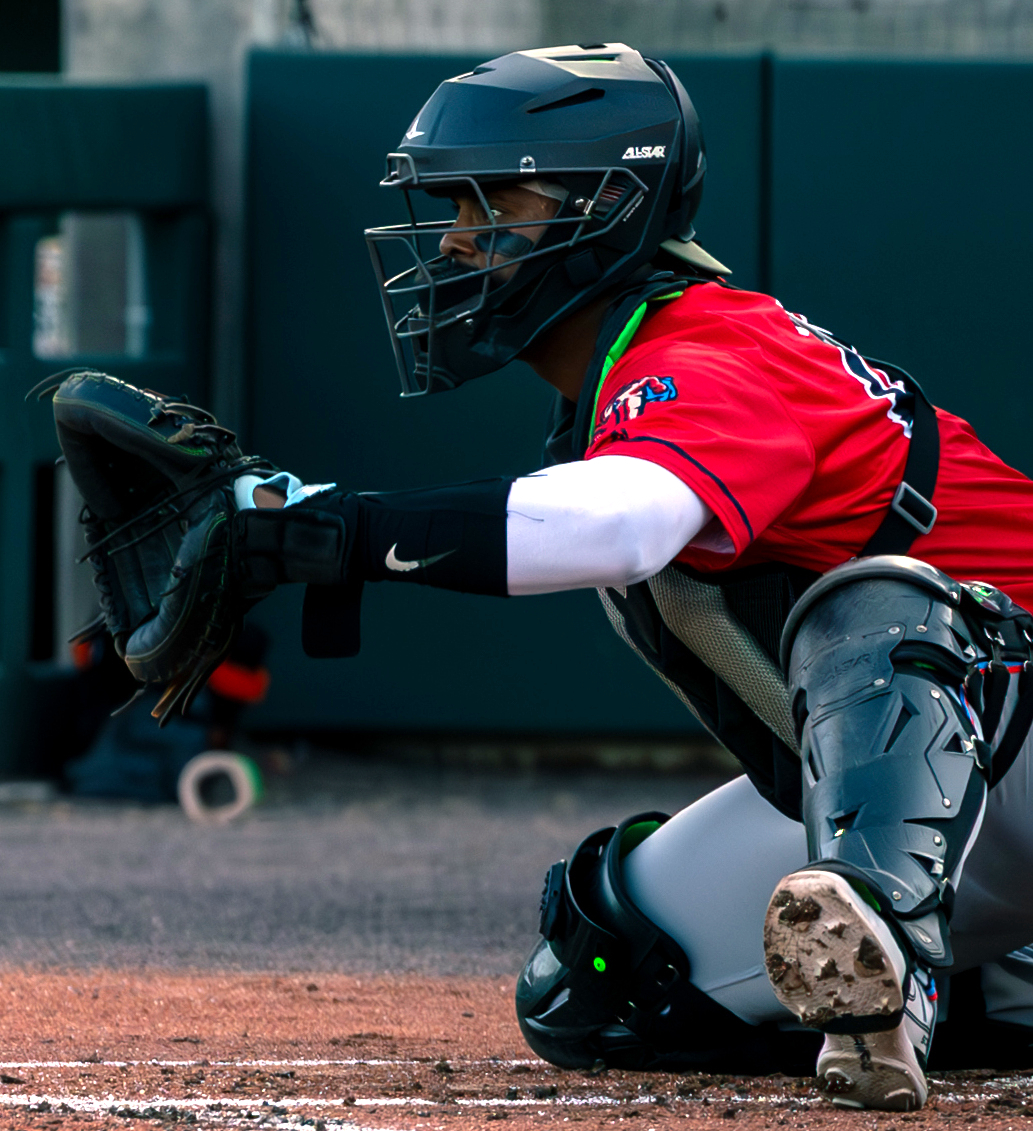
Navarreto with the Jacksonville Jumbo Shrimp in 2025

On December 18, 2019, Navarreto signed a minor league contract with the Miami Marlins. The Marlins promoted him to the major leagues for the first time on August 23, 2020. He made his major league debut that day as the starting catcher versus the Washington Nationals. On August 29, Navarreto was designated for assignment by the Marlins. To begin the 2021 season, Navarreto was assigned to the Jacksonville Jumbo Shrimp of Triple-A East. Navarreto played in 58 games between three Marlins affiliates in 2021: Jacksonville, the Double-A Pensacola Blue Wahoos, and the Single-A Jupiter Hammerheads. With the three teams, Navarreto hit .214/.275/.406 with 9 home runs and 26 RBI. He elected free agency following the season on November 7, 2021.

=== Milwaukee Brewers ===
Prior to the 2022 season, Navarreto signed with the York Revolution of the Atlantic League of Professional Baseball. However, before the start of the ALPB season, on March 15, 2022, Navarreto signed a minor league contract with the Milwaukee Brewers organization. He spent the year with the Triple–A Nashville Sounds, slashing .269/.324/.369 with four home runs and 18 RBI over 43 games.

Navarreto returned to Nashville in 2023, making 73 appearances and batting .233/.305/.380 with seven home runs and 42 RBI. He split the 2024 campaign between Nashville and the rookie-level Arizona Complex League Brewers, playing in 44 total games and hitting .222/.270/.296 with one home run and 23 RBI. Navarreto elected free agency following the season on November 4, 2024.

=== Miami Marlins (second stint) ===
On March 5, 2025, Navarreto signed a minor league contract with the Miami Marlins. In 47 appearances for the Triple-A Jacksonville Jumbo Shrimp, he batted .229/.301/.392 with six home runs, 27 RBI, and three stolen bases. On September 1, the Marlins selected Navarreto's contract, adding him to their active roster. He played in his first MLB contest since 2020 on September 5, and hit his first career home run off of Tanner Banks of the Philadelphia Phillies. In eight appearances for Miami, he went 4-for-14 (.286) with one home run and five RBI. On November 5, Navarreto was removed from the 40-man roster and sent outright to Jacksonville. He elected free agency the next day.

On December 15, 2025, Navarreto re-signed with the Marlins on a minor league contract. He was assigned to Triple-A Jacksonville to begin the regular season. On June 21, 2026, the Marlins selected Navarreto's contract, adding him to their active roster. On October 30, he was sent outright to Triple-A and subsequently elected free agency.

=== Philadelphia Phillies ===
On November 10, 2026, Navarreto signed a minor league contract with the Philadelphia Phillies.
