= Freddy Tarnok =

American baseball player (born 1998)

Hiroshima Toyo Carp – No. 42
- Pitcher
- Born: November 24, 1998 (age 27); Brandon, Florida, U.S.
- Bats: Right Throws: Right

Professional debut
- MLB: August 17, 2022, for the Atlanta Braves
- NPB: March 28, 2026, for the Hiroshima Toyo Carp

MLB statistics (through 2025 season)
- Win–loss record: 2–1
- Earned run average: 3.97
- Strikeouts: 25

NPB statistics (through August 18, 2026)
- Win–loss record: 0–4
- Earned run average: 4.01
- Strikeouts: 42
- Stats at Baseball Reference

Teams
- Atlanta Braves (2022); Oakland Athletics (2023); Miami Marlins (2025); Hiroshima Toyo Carp (2026–present)

Frederic Michael Tarnok (born November 24, 1998) is an American professional baseball pitcher for the Hiroshima Toyo Carp of Nippon Professional Baseball (NPB). He has previously played in Major League Baseball (MLB) for the Atlanta Braves, Oakland Athletics, and Miami Marlins. He was selected by the Braves in the third round of the 2017 MLB draft, and made his MLB debut with them in 2022.

== Amateur career ==
Tarnok attended Riverview High School in Riverview, Florida, where he played baseball. In 2017, his senior year, he went 7–0 with a 0.66 ERA while also batting .393. Following his senior season, he was selected by the Atlanta Braves in the third round of the 2017 Major League Baseball draft. He signed with the Braves, forgoing his commitment to play college baseball at the University of Tampa.

== Professional career ==
=== Atlanta Braves ===
Tarnok made his professional debut with the Rookie-level Gulf Coast League Braves, going 0–3 with a 2.57 ERA over 14 innings. In 2018, he pitched with the Rome Braves of the Single–A South Atlantic League, with whom he was named an All-Star. Over 27 games (11 starts), Tarnok went 5–5 with a 3.96 ERA, striking out 83 batters over 77 1/3 innings. Tarnok missed time during the 2019 season due to injury, but still started 19 games for the Florida Fire Frogs of the High–A Florida State League, pitching to a 3–7 record with a 4.87 ERA. He did not play in a game in 2020 due to the cancellation of the minor league season because of the COVID-19 pandemic. Tarnok missed the beginning of the 2021 season while rehabbing and made his first appearance in mid-June for Rome, now members of the High-A East. After 28 1/3 innings pitched with Rome, he was promoted to the Mississippi Braves of the Double-A South in mid-July with whom he finished the year. Over 16 games (14 starts) between the two teams, Tarnok went 6–4 with a 3.44 ERA and 109 strikeouts over 73 1/3 innings.

On November 18, 2021, the Braves selected Tarnok's contract and added him to the 40-man roster to protect him from the Rule 5 draft. He returned to Mississippi to begin the 2022 season. In early July, he was promoted to the Gwinnett Stripers of the Triple-A International League. On August 16, 2022, Tarnok was called up to the majors. He made his MLB debut on August 17 from the bullpen. He pitched two-thirds of an inning with no hits or walks and his first career strikeout against Tyler Naquin.

=== Oakland Athletics ===
On December 12, 2022, the Oakland Athletics acquired Tarnok from the Braves in a three-team trade in which the Atlanta Braves acquired Sean Murphy, the Milwaukee Brewers acquired William Contreras, Joel Payamps, and Justin Yeager, and the Athletics also acquired Manny Piña, Kyle Muller, Esteury Ruiz, and Royber Salinas. On April 13, 2023, Tarnok was placed on the 60-day injured list with a right shoulder strain. He was activated from the injured list on July 8 and subsequently optioned to the Triple–A Las Vegas Aviators. He was recalled to the active roster on July 14. In 5 appearances for Oakland, he logged a 4.91 ERA with 14 strikeouts in 14 2/3 innings pitched. On August 31, Tarnok underwent season–ending surgery to repair the labrum and cartilage in his right hip.

Tarnok began the 2024 season in Triple–A Las Vegas, recording a 13.50 ERA with six strikeouts across six appearances.

=== Philadelphia Phillies ===
On June 1, 2024, Tarnok was claimed off waivers by the Philadelphia Phillies. After two scoreless appearances for the High–A Jersey Shore BlueClaws, he worked to an 0–3 record and 6.33 ERA with 28 strikeouts across 21 1/3 innings pitched with the Triple–A Lehigh Valley IronPigs. On November 4, Tarnok was removed from the 40–man roster and sent outright to Lehigh Valley; he subsequently rejected the assignment and elected free agency.

=== Miami Marlins ===
On December 29, 2024, Tarnok signed a minor league contract with the Miami Marlins. In 12 appearances for the Triple-A Jacksonville Jumbo Shrimp, he posted a 2–2 record and 4.79 ERA with 44 strikeouts across 41 1/3 innings pitched. On June 15, 2025, the Marlins selected Tarnok's contract, adding him to their active roster. In five appearances for Miami, he posted a 1–0 record and 2.45 ERA with 10 strikeouts and one save across 7 1/3 innings pitched. Tarnok finished the season with Jacksonville Jumbo Shrimp winning the Triple A National Championship against the Las Vegas Aviators. On November 5, Tarnok was removed from the 40-man roster and sent outright to Jacksonville. He elected free agency the following day.

=== Hiroshima Toyo Carp ===
On November 22, 2025, Tarnok signed a one-year, $1.5 million contract with the Hiroshima Toyo Carp of Nippon Professional Baseball.

== Personal life ==
Tarnok's parents are Jeff and Neung. He has 2 half brothers Christopher and Nick. Through his mother, Tarnok is of Thai descent.
