= Jack Winkler =

American baseball player (born 1998)

Free agent
- Second baseman
- Born: November 4, 1998 (age 28); Littleton, Colorado, U.S.
- Bats: Right Throws: Right

MLB debut
- May 31, 2025, for the Miami Marlins

MLB statistics (through 2025 season)
- Batting average: .250
- Home runs: 0
- Runs batted in: 0
- Stats at Baseball Reference

Teams
- Miami Marlins (2025)

Jack Tanner Winkler (born November 4, 1998) is an American professional baseball second baseman who is a free agent. He has previously played in Major League Baseball (MLB) for the Miami Marlins. He played college baseball for the San Francisco Dons, and was selected by the Oakland Athletics in the 10th round of the 2021 MLB draft. He made his MLB debut with the Marlins in 2025.

== Early life ==
Winkler was born on November 4, 1998, in Littleton, Colorado. He attended Chatfield Senior High School and graduated as salutatorian in 2017.

== College career ==
Winkler played college baseball for the San Francisco Dons from 2018 to 2021. Throughout his college career, he played as an infielder. In 2018, Winkler played collegiate summer baseball with the New Bedford Bay Sox of the New England Collegiate Baseball League. In summer 2019, he played for the Wareham Gatemen of the Cape Cod Baseball League. In the summers of 2020 and 2021 he played for the St. Cloud Rox of the Northwoods League.

== Professional career ==
=== Oakland Athletics ===
Winkler was selected 308th overall by the Oakland Athletics in the 10th round of the 2021 MLB draft. He split his first professional season between the Rookie-level Arizona Complex League Athletics and Single-A Stockton Ports, hitting .191 in 24 total games.

Winkler spent the 2022 season with the High-A Lansing Lugnuts, batting .267/.355/.379 with four home runs, 25 RBI, and four stolen bases across 60 appearances. Winkler split the 2023 season between the Lugnuts and the Double-A Midland RockHounds. In 117 appearances for the two affiliates, he slashed a combined .245/.331/.359 with seven home runs, 58 RBI, and 22 stolen bases. Winkler returned to the RockHounds for the 2024 season, making 127 appearances and hitting .223/.310/.345 with eight home runs, 57 RBI, and 28 stolen bases.

=== Miami Marlins ===
On December 11, 2024, the Miami Marlins selected Winkler in the minor league phase of the 2024 Rule 5 draft. He began the 2025 season with the Triple-A Jacksonville Jumbo Shrimp.

==== Major leagues ====
On May 30, 2025, Winkler was selected to the 40-man roster and promoted to the major leagues for the first time. He made 11 appearances for Miami, going 2-for-12 (.167) with one stolen base. On August 4, Winkler was designated for assignment by the Marlins. He cleared waivers and was sent outright to Triple-A Jacksonville on August 6. On September 5, the Marlins selected Winkler's contract, adding him back to their active roster. He went 2-for-4 (.500) in three games for the Marlins to conclude the year. On November 6, Winkler was removed from the 40-man roster and elected free agency.

=== Houston Astros ===
On February 5, 2026, Winkler signed a minor league contract with the Houston Astros. He made 56 appearances for the Triple-A Sugar Land Space Cowboys, slashing .185/.260/.306 with five home runs, 28 RBI, and four stolen bases. Winkler was released by the Astros organization on June 22.

=== Athletics ===
On June 30, 2026, Winkler signed a minor league contract with the Athletics. In 56 games with Triple-A Las Vegas Aviators he batted .242/.335/.419 with 9 home runs, 38 RBIs and 5 stolen bases. He elected free agency on November 2.
