= Josh Simpson (baseball) =

American baseball player (born 1997)

Philadelphia Phillies
- Pitcher
- Born: August 19, 1997 (age 29); Stafford, Connecticut, U.S.
- Bats: Left Throws: Left

MLB debut
- June 21, 2025, for the Miami Marlins

MLB statistics (through 2026 season)
- Win–loss record: 4–2
- Earned run average: 7.82
- Strikeouts: 46
- Stats at Baseball Reference

Teams
- Miami Marlins (2025); Seattle Mariners (2026)

Joshua Wayne Simpson (born August 19, 1997) is an American professional baseball pitcher in the Philadelphia Phillies organization. He has previously played in Major League Baseball (MLB) for the Miami Marlins, with whom he made his MLB debut in 2025 and the Seattle Mariners.

== Career ==
=== Amateur career ===
Simpson attended Stafford High School in Stafford, Connecticut. He was named to the Connecticut High School Coaches All-Star Team in 2014 and 2015. He then played college baseball at for the Columbia Lions. After missing 2018 with an injury, he was a named to the All-Ivy League second team in 2019.

=== Miami Marlins ===
The Miami Marlins selected Simpson in the 32nd round of the 2019 Major League Baseball draft. He spent his first professional season with the rookie-level Gulf Coast League Marlins and Batavia Muckdogs.

Simpson did not play in a game in 2020 due to the cancellation of the minor league season because of the COVID-19 pandemic. He returned to pitch for the Florida Complex League Marlins and Beloit Snappers in 2021. After the season, he played in the Arizona Fall League. Simpson started 2022 with the Pensacola Blue Wahoos. On November 15, the Marlins added Simpson to their 40-man roster to protect him from the Rule 5 draft.

Simpson was optioned to the Triple-A Jacksonville Jumbo Shrimp to begin the 2023 season. In 23 appearances for Jacksonville, he logged a 4.50 earned run average (ERA) with 55 strikeouts in 32 innings pitched. On September 12, Simpson was promoted to the major leagues for the first time. He did not make an appearance for Miami before he was optioned back to Jacksonville on September 17, temporarily becoming a phantom ballplayer.

Simpson began the 2024 season on the injured list with left elbow neuritis. He was transferred to the 60-day injured list on April 20. On April 23, it was announced that Simpson would miss three months after undergoing surgery for ulnar nerve neuritis. He was activated from the injured list on September 3. On November 4, Simpson was removed from the 40-man roster and sent outright to Jacksonville.

Simpson made 27 appearances for Jacksonville to begin the 2025 season, posting a 3–0 record and 3.41 ERA with 25 strikeouts and three saves across 31 2/3 innings pitched. On June 21, Simpson was selected to the 40-man roster and promoted to the major leagues for the second time. On June 26, Simpson recorded his first career MLB win after tossing a scoreless 1/3 of an inning against the San Francisco Giants. He made 31 appearances for Miami during his rookie campaign, compiling a 4–2 record and 7.34 ERA with 36 strikeouts across 30 2/3 innings pitched.

On February 12, 2026, Simpson was designated for assignment by the Marlins following the signing of John King.

=== Seattle Mariners ===
On February 16, 2026, the Marlins traded Simpson to the Seattle Mariners in exchange for cash considerations. He first pitched for the Mariners in May, with a 7.71 ERA in three games before being sent back down to Triple-A. Simpson returned to the majors once in June, allowing a run in 2/3 of an inning. He made eight appearances for Seattle, struggling to a 9.82 ERA with 10 strikeouts across 7 1/3 innings pitched. On November 2, Simpson was removed from the 40–man roster elected free agency.

=== Philadelphia Phillies ===
On November 18, 2026, Simpson signed a minor league contract with the Philadelphia Phillies.
