= Eury Pérez (pitcher) =

Dominican baseball player (born 2003)

Miami Marlins – No. 39
- Pitcher
- Born: April 15, 2003 (age 23); Santiago, Dominican Republic
- Bats: Right Throws: Right

MLB debut
- May 12, 2023, for the Miami Marlins

MLB statistics (through 2026 season)
- Win–loss record: 20–23
- Earned run average: 3.80
- Strikeouts: 383
- Stats at Baseball Reference

Teams
- Miami Marlins (2023, 2025–present)

Eury Rafael Pérez (born April 15, 2003) is a Dominican professional baseball pitcher for the Miami Marlins of Major League Baseball (MLB). Pérez signed with the Marlins as an international free agent in 2019, and made his MLB debut in 2023.

== Career ==
Pérez signed with the Miami Marlins as an international free agent on July 2, 2019. He did not play in a game in 2020 due to the cancellation of the minor league season because of the COVID-19 pandemic. Pérez made his professional debut in 2021 with the Single-A Jupiter Hammerheads. In 20 starts split between Jupiter and the High-A Beloit Snappers, Pérez registered a cumulative 3–5 record and 1.96 ERA with 108 strikeouts in 78 innings pitched.

Pérez split the 2022 season between Jupiter and the Double-A Pensacola Blue Wahoos. In 18 combined starts, he posted a 3–3 record and 3.97 ERA with 110 strikeouts in 77.0 innings of work. Following the season, he was named the Marlins' Minor League Pitcher of the Year. Pérez was assigned to Pensacola to begin the 2023 season, where he made 6 starts and logged a 3–1 record and 2.32 ERA with 42 strikeouts in 31.0 innings pitched.

On May 10 2023, the Marlins announced that Pérez would be promoted to the major leagues for the first time and debut against the Cincinnati Reds two days later. He officially had his contract selected to the active roster on May 12. He was optioned to Double-A Pensacola on July 7. In 19 starts for the Marlins in his rookie campaign, Pérez registered a 5–6 record and 3.15 ERA with 108 strikeouts across 91 1/3 innings pitched.

On April 4, 2024, it was announced that Pérez would undergo Tommy John surgery, ending his season. On June 9, 2025, Pérez was activated off of the injured list to make his return from surgery. Over the remainder of the season, he made 20 starts for Miami, compiling a 7–6 record and 4.25 ERA with 105 strikeouts across 95 1/3 innings pitched.

On May 29, 2026, Pérez was ruled out for eight weeks after suffering a gracilis strain. In his third start after being activated from the injured list, on July 5, Pérez threw seven innings towards a perfect game, retiring all 21 batters he faced on 92 pitches, before being taken out of the game. Reliever Lake Bachar lost the perfect game and no-hitter to the first two batters of the 8th; though the Marlins had an 8–0 lead when Pérez was removed, the bullpen struggled mightily to finish the game and the Marlins only narrowly won 9–8.

On September 25, 2026, he threw his first complete game shutout against the Atlanta Braves, which was also his first shutout. He only allowed 1 walk and 1 hit in a 3–0 win.
