= 2024 Miami Marlins season =

2024 Miami Marlins
- League: National League
- Division: East
- Ballpark: LoanDepot Park
- City: Miami, Florida
- Record: 62–100 (.383)
- Divisional place: 5th
- Owners: Bruce Sherman
- President of baseball operations: Peter Bendix
- Managers: Skip Schumaker (until September 27); Luis Urueta (from September 28 onward)
- Television: Bally Sports Florida; Bally Sports Sun
- Radio: WINZ; Miami Marlins Radio Network (English)

The 2024 Miami Marlins season was the 32nd season for the Major League Baseball (MLB) franchise in the National League and the 13th as the Miami Marlins. The Marlins played their home games at LoanDepot Park as members of the National League East. After their loss on September 3, the Marlins were eliminated from playoff contention.

On September 13, the Marlins used their 70th different player of the season, breaking the record previously held by the 2019 Seattle Mariners for the most players used in a single season. The 2025 Baltimore Orioles later tied this record on September 20, and the 2025 Atlanta Braves broke it on September 28 with 71 players, which would be matched a season later by the 2026 San Francisco Giants.

After the season, manager Skip Schumaker announced he would not be returning in 2025.

== Offseason ==
Marlins general manager Kim Ng, the sport's first female GM, left the team after three years due to a disagreement between the Marlins and Ng. Reports indicated the reason for the disagreement was that the Marlins wanted to hire a president of baseball operations as her superior, thereby reducing her power as GM. The Marlins later named Peter Bendix, a vice president for the Tampa Bay Rays, the team's new GM.

== Regular season ==
=== Season standings ===
==== National League East ====
NL East
Team	W	L	Pct.	GB	Home	Road
Philadelphia Phillies	95	67	.586	—	54‍–‍27	41‍–‍40
Atlanta Braves	89	73	.549	6	46‍–‍35	43‍–‍38
New York Mets	89	73	.549	6	46‍–‍35	43‍–‍38
Washington Nationals	71	91	.438	24	38‍–‍43	33‍–‍48
Miami Marlins	62	100	.383	33	30‍–‍51	32‍–‍49

==== National League Wild Card ====
Division leaders
Team	W	L	Pct.
Los Angeles Dodgers	98	64	.605
Philadelphia Phillies	95	67	.586
Milwaukee Brewers	93	69	.574

Wild Card teams (Top 3 teams qualify for postseason)
Team	W	L	Pct.	GB
San Diego Padres	93	69	.574	+4
Atlanta Braves	89	73	.549	—
New York Mets	89	73	.549	—
Arizona Diamondbacks	89	73	.549	—
St. Louis Cardinals	83	79	.512	6
Chicago Cubs	83	79	.512	6
San Francisco Giants	80	82	.494	9
Cincinnati Reds	77	85	.475	12
Pittsburgh Pirates	76	86	.469	13
Washington Nationals	71	91	.438	18
Miami Marlins	62	100	.383	27
Colorado Rockies	61	101	.377	28

==== Record vs. opponents ====
===== Record vs. National League =====
2024 National League record Source: MLB Standings Grid – 2024
Team	AZ	ATL	CHC	CIN	COL	LAD	MIA	MIL	NYM	PHI	PIT	SD	SF	STL	WSH	AL
Arizona	—	2–5	3–3	5–1	9–4	6–7	4–2	4–3	3–4	4–3	4–2	6–7	7–6	3–3	5–1	24–22
Atlanta	5–2	—	4–2	2–4	3–3	2–5	9–4	2–4	7–6	7–6	3–3	3–4	4–3	2–4	5–8	31–15
Chicago	3–3	2–4	—	5–8	4–2	4–2	4–3	5–8	3–4	2–4	7–6	2–4	3–4	6–7	6–1	27–19
Cincinnati	1–5	4–2	8–5	—	6–1	4–3	5–2	4–9	2–4	4–3	5–8	2–4	2–4	7–6	2–4	21–25
Colorado	4–9	3–3	2–4	1–6	—	3–10	2–5	4–3	2–4	2–4	2–4	8–5	3–10	3–4	2–4	20–26
Los Angeles	7–6	5–2	2–4	3–4	10–3	—	5–1	4–3	4–2	1–5	4–2	5–8	9–4	5–2	4–2	30–16
Miami	2–4	4–9	3–4	2–5	5–2	1–5	—	4–2	6–7	6–7	0–7	2–4	3–3	3–3	2–11	19–27
Milwaukee	3–4	4–2	8–5	9–4	3–4	3–4	2–4	—	5–1	2–4	7–6	2–5	4–2	8–5	2–4	31–15
New York	4–3	6–7	4–3	4–2	4–2	2–4	7–6	1–5	—	6–7	5–2	5–2	2–4	4–2	11–2	24–22
Philadelphia	3–4	6–7	4–2	3–4	4–2	5–1	7–6	4–2	7–6	—	3–4	5–1	5–2	4–2	9–4	26–20
Pittsburgh	2–4	3–3	6–7	8–5	4–2	2–4	7–0	6–7	2–5	4–3	—	0–6	2–4	5–8	4–3	20–26
San Diego	7–6	4–3	4–2	4–2	5–8	8–5	4–2	5–2	2–5	1–5	6–0	—	7–6	3–4	6–0	27–19
San Francisco	6–7	3–4	4–3	4–2	10–3	4–9	3–3	2–4	4–2	2–5	4–2	6–7	—	1–5	4–3	23–23
St. Louis	3–3	4–2	7–6	6–7	4–3	2–5	3–3	5–8	2–4	2–4	8–5	4–3	5–1	—	4–3	24–22
Washington	1–5	8–5	1–6	4–2	4–2	2–4	11–2	4–2	2–11	4–9	3–4	0–6	3–4	3–4	—	21–25

Updated with the results of all games through September 30, 2024.

===== Record vs. American League =====
2024 National League record vs. American League Source: MLB Standings
Team	BAL	BOS	CWS	CLE	DET	HOU	KC	LAA	MIN	NYY	OAK	SEA	TB	TEX	TOR
Arizona	1–2	3–0	2–1	3–0	1–2	1–2	2–1	2–1	1–2	1–2	2–1	1–2	0–3	2–2	2–1
Atlanta	1–2	3–1	1–2	2–1	3–0	3–0	2–1	2–1	3–0	2–1	2–1	1–2	2–1	2–1	2–1
Chicago	3–0	1–2	4–0	0–3	2–1	3–0	2–1	2–1	2–1	1–2	1–2	2–1	1–2	1–2	2–1
Cincinnati	0–3	1–2	3–0	1–3	0–3	3–0	0–3	3–0	2–1	3–0	1–2	0–3	1–2	1–2	2–1
Colorado	1–2	2–1	1–2	2–1	1–2	0–4	2–1	2–1	1–2	1–2	1–2	1–2	1–2	3–0	1–2
Los Angeles	2–1	3–0	3–0	2–1	1–2	1–2	2–1	2–2	2–1	2–1	2–1	3–0	2–1	1–2	2–1
Miami	2–1	0–3	2–1	1–2	2–1	0–3	1–2	0–3	2–1	1–2	1–2	2–1	1–3	1–2	3–0
Milwaukee	2–1	2–1	3–0	3–0	2–1	1–2	1–2	2–1	3–1	1–2	2–1	2–1	2–1	3–0	2–1
New York	2–1	3–0	3–0	0–3	1–2	1–2	2–1	1–2	2–1	4–0	1–2	0–3	0–3	2–1	2–1
Philadelphia	1–2	1–2	3–0	1–2	2–1	2–1	2–1	2–1	1–2	0–3	1–2	1–2	3–0	3–0	3–1
Pittsburgh	2–1	0–3	3–0	1–2	2–2	2–1	1–2	1–2	2–1	2–1	0–3	2–1	1–2	1–2	1–2
San Diego	2–1	2–1	3–0	2–1	2–1	2–1	2–1	0–3	2–1	1–2	3–0	1–3	2–1	2–1	1–2
San Francisco	2–1	1–2	2–1	1–2	2–1	2–1	3–0	1–2	2–1	0–3	2–2	1–2	1–2	2–1	1–2
St. Louis	3–0	2–1	1–2	2–1	1–2	1–2	1–3	2–1	2–1	2–1	2–1	1–2	2–1	2–1	0–3
Washington	2–2	1–2	1–2	1–2	2–1	2–1	0–3	2–1	1–2	2–1	1–2	2–1	1–2	1–2	2–1

Updated with the results of all games through September 30, 2024.

== Roster ==
2024 Miami Marlins
Roster
Pitchers: 48 Shaun Anderson; 34 Matt Andriese; 84 Lake Bachar; 55 Mike Baumann; 83 Valente Bellozo; 37 Anthony Bender; 73 Jonathan Bermúdez; 31 Huascar Brazobán; 27 Edward Cabrera; 84 J. T. Chargois; 26 Yonny Chirinos; 51 Declan Cronin; 49 Xzavion Curry; 78 Brett de Geus; 74 Kent Emanuel; 53 Calvin Faucher; 29 Braxton Garrett; 92 Vladimir Gutiérrez; 78 David Hensley; 78 Bryan Hoeing; 91 Austin Kitchen; 44 Jesus Luzardo; 52 Anthony Maldonado; 47,68 Darren McCaughan; 66 John McMillon; 23 Max Meyer; 71 Roddery Muñoz; 43 Andrew Nardi; 77 Adam Oller; 70 Michael Petersen; 35 A. J. Puk; 67 Emmanuel Ramírez; 28 Trevor Rogers; 18 Sixto Sánchez; 66 Tanner Scott; 20 Burch Smith; 62 George Soriano; 38,92 Jesús Tinoco; 73 Kyle Tyler; 59 Anthony Veneziano; 68 Eli Villalobos; 60 Ryan Weathers	Catchers: 25 Christian Bethancourt; 4 Nick Fortes; 89 Jhonny Pereda; 47 Ali Sánchez; Infielders: 7 Tim Anderson; 3 Luis Arráez; 9 Josh Bell; 41 Jonah Bride; 17 Vidal Bruján; 36 Jake Burger; 79 José Devers; 63 Xavier Edwards; 59 Tristan Gray; 61 Otto Lopez; 24 Connor Norby; 15 Emmanuel Rivera	Outfielders: 2 Jazz Chisholm Jr.; 56 Griffin Conine; 14 Bryan De La Cruz; 24 Avisaíl García; 1 Nick Gordon; 25 David Hensley; 58 Derek Hill; 54 Dane Myers; 20 Cristian Pache; 12 Jesús Sánchez; 86 Javier Sanoja; 28 Kyle Stowers; 19 Forrest Wall	Manager: 45 Skip Schumaker; Coaches: 50 Rod Barajas (field coordinator); 81 Griffin Benedict (quality assurance); 21 Wellington Cepeda (bullpen); 85 Rob Flippo (bullpen coordinator); 46 Jason Hart (assistant hitting); 11 Jon Jay (first base/outfield); 98 B.J. López (bullpen catcher); 57 John Mabry (hitting); -- Brandon Mann (pitching strategist); 32 Bill Mueller (assistant hitting); 33 Jody Reed (third base/infield); 30 Mel Stottlemyre Jr. (pitching); 40 Luis Urueta (bench)

== Player stats ==
= Indicates team leader

=== Batting ===
Note: G = Games played; AB = At bats; R = Runs scored; H = Hits; 2B = Doubles; 3B = Triples; HR = Home runs; RBI = Runs batted in; SB = Stolen bases; BB = Walks; AVG = Batting average; SLG = Slugging average

Player	G	AB	R	H	2B	3B	HR	RBI	SB	BB	AVG	SLG
Jake Burger	137	535	68	134	23	1	29	76	1	31	.250	.460
Jesús Sánchez	149	489	60	123	25	1	18	64	16	41	.252	.417
Bryan De La Cruz	105	424	44	104	19	0	18	51	3	25	.245	.417
Otto Lopez	117	403	49	109	23	1	6	39	20	25	.270	.377
Josh Bell	104	398	38	95	18	1	14	49	0	34	.239	.394
Jazz Chisholm Jr.	101	386	46	96	14	4	13	50	22	39	.249	.407
Nick Fortes	110	308	28	70	16	0	4	29	0	11	.227	.318
Xavier Edwards	70	265	39	87	12	5	1	26	31	33	.328	.423
Nick Gordon	95	260	29	59	11	1	8	32	5	11	.227	.369
Vidal Bruján	102	248	32	55	14	2	2	16	5	25	.222	.319
Tim Anderson	65	234	16	50	3	0	0	9	4	7	.214	.226
Jonah Bride	71	232	30	64	10	0	11	39	0	30	.276	.461
Emmanuel Rivera	96	201	15	43	6	1	1	15	2	20	.214	.269
Kyle Stowers	50	156	12	29	7	2	2	15	0	13	.186	.295
Connor Norby	36	146	29	36	8	0	7	17	3	15	.247	.445
Luis Arráez	33	137	22	41	8	1	0	5	0	8	.299	.372
Derek Hill	32	107	11	25	4	1	4	18	4	2	.234	.402
Dane Myers	44	95	17	25	6	1	3	19	4	8	.263	.442
Ali Sánchez	31	84	4	14	2	0	0	4	2	4	.167	.190
Griffin Conine	30	82	14	22	4	1	3	12	0	6	.268	.451
Christian Bethancourt	38	82	9	13	3	0	2	7	0	3	.159	.268
Cristian Pache	35	60	4	11	3	0	1	7	1	4	.183	.283
David Hensley	23	52	9	11	1	0	1	4	1	6	.212	.288
Avisaíl García	18	50	4	12	1	0	2	2	0	1	.240	.380
Jhonny Pereda	20	39	2	9	0	0	0	4	0	0	.231	.231
Javier Sanoja	15	35	3	8	2	0	0	2	0	1	.229	.286
Tristan Gray	7	7	0	0	0	0	0	0	0	0	.000	.000
José Devers	3	4	1	1	0	0	0	0	0	0	.250	.250
Forrest Wall	3	3	1	1	0	0	0	0	1	0	.333	.333
Team totals	162	5522	637	1347	243	23	150	611	125	403	.244	.378

Source:Baseball Reference

=== Pitching ===
Note: W = Wins; L = Losses; ERA = Earned run average; G = Games pitched; G = Games started; SV = Saves; IP = Innings pitched; H = Hits allowed; R = Runs allowed; ER = Earned runs allowed; BB = Walks allowed; SO = Strikeouts

Player	W	L	ERA	G	GS	SV	IP	H	R	ER	BB	SO
Trevor Rogers	2	9	4.53	21	21	0	105.1	115	58	53	46	85
Edward Cabrera	4	8	4.95	20	20	0	96.1	82	60	53	50	107
Ryan Weathers	5	6	3.63	16	16	0	86.2	78	39	35	24	80
Roddery Muñoz	2	7	6.53	18	17	0	82.2	89	66	60	42	70
Declan Cronin	3	4	4.35	56	0	0	70.1	75	41	34	25	72
Valente Bellozo	3	4	3.67	13	13	0	68.2	69	31	28	21	44
Jesús Luzardo	3	6	5.00	12	12	0	66.2	61	37	37	22	58
Max Meyer	3	5	5.68	11	11	0	57.0	62	38	36	19	46
Calvin Faucher	2	3	3.19	53	0	6	53.2	49	25	19	26	63
Anthony Bender	5	2	4.08	59	0	1	53.0	50	25	24	18	59
Andrew Nardi	3	2	5.07	59	0	0	49.2	44	29	28	18	70
Tanner Scott	6	5	1.18	44	0	18	45.2	19	10	6	27	53
A.J. Puk	4	8	4.30	32	4	1	44.0	36	27	21	23	45
Adam Oller	2	4	5.31	8	8	0	42.1	43	25	25	22	36
Braxton Garrett	2	2	5.35	7	7	0	37.0	40	24	22	4	34
Darren McCaughan	0	0	5.75	10	5	2	36.0	44	26	23	9	27
Sixto Sánchez	0	3	6.06	14	7	0	35.2	43	29	24	14	17
Kyle Tyler	0	2	5.40	8	7	0	31.2	37	19	19	18	25
Huascar Brazobán	1	2	2.93	20	0	0	30.2	20	14	10	11	34
Bryan Hoeing	1	2	2.70	16	2	0	30.0	29	10	9	9	25
Yonny Chirinos	0	2	6.30	6	6	0	30.0	43	21	21	13	25
Burch Smith	2	0	4.25	25	0	0	29.2	39	15	14	9	23
George Soriano	1	1	6.75	22	0	1	29.1	27	23	22	13	29
Jesús Tinoco	1	0	2.03	21	0	3	26.2	13	6	6	5	30
Emmanuel Ramírez	0	1	6.97	15	0	0	20.2	21	17	16	8	21
Anthony Maldonado	1	1	5.68	16	1	1	19.0	21	12	12	7	11
Xzavion Curry	2	0	3.00	9	1	0	18.0	9	6	6	2	13
Kent Emanuel	0	0	6.62	12	0	0	17.2	20	14	13	7	12
J. T. Chargois	1	0	1.62	15	0	0	16.2	15	3	3	7	12
Mike Baumann	0	1	6.59	11	0	0	13.2	11	10	10	7	18
Shaun Anderson	0	2	9.00	4	2	0	13.0	28	17	13	0	7
John McMillon	2	1	1.50	10	0	0	12.0	7	4	2	5	13
Anthony Veneziano	1	0	3.18	10	0	0	11.1	12	5	4	2	12
Lake Bachar	0	1	3.86	10	0	0	9.1	10	5	4	4	11
Austin Kitchen	0	1	14.14	4	1	0	7.0	16	12	11	3	4
Jonathan Bermúdez	0	1	8.10	3	1	0	6.2	11	6	6	2	4
Matt Andriese	0	1	6.00	4	0	0	6.0	7	5	4	1	7
Brett de Geus	0	2	6.35	7	0	0	5.2	7	5	4	2	4
Michael Peterson	0	1	4.76	5	0	0	5.2	7	4	3	3	3
Eli Villalobos	0	0	2.08	3	0	0	4.1	3	1	1	2	3
Emmanuel Rivera	0	0	9.00	4	0	0	4.0	7	4	4	0	0
Vladimir Gutiérrez	0	0	6.75	1	0	0	4.0	3	3	3	2	4
David Hensley	0	0	9.00	1	0	0	2.0	2	2	2	1	0
Vidal Bruján	0	0	43.20	2	0	0	1.2	7	8	8	3	1
Jhonny Pereda	0	0	0.00	1	0	0	0.1	0	0	0	0	0
Team totals	62	100	4.73	162	162	33	1437.1	1431	841	755	556	1317

Note: No Earned run average (ERA) qualifiers; 1 inning pitched per scheduled game (162 innings pitched).

Source:Baseball Reference

== Game log ==
=== Regular season ===
Legend
	Marlins win
	Marlins loss
	Postponement
	Eliminated from playoff spot
**Bold**	Marlins team member

2024 game log: 62–100 (Home: 30–51; Away: 32–49)
March/April: 7–24 (Home: 3–15; Away: 4–9)

#	Date	Opponent	Score	Win	Loss	Save	Attendance	Record	Box/Streak
1	March 28	Pirates	5–6 (12)	Ortiz (1–0)	**Cronin** (0–1)	Hernández (1)	32,564	0–1	L1
2	March 29	Pirates	2–7	Ryan (1–0)	**Puk** (0–1)	—	13,636	0–2	L2
3	March 30	Pirates	3–9	Jones (1–0)	**Weathers** (0–1)	—	14,203	0–3	L3
4	March 31	Pirates	7–9 (10)	Bednar (1–0)	**Scott** (0–1)	Stratton (1)	15,915	0–4	L4
5	April 1	Angels	4–7	Cimber (1–0)	**Scott** (0–2)	Estévez (2)	9,411	0–5	L5
6	April 2	Angels	1–3	Anderson (1–0)	**Luzardo** (0–1)	García (1)	9,033	0–6	L6
7	April 3	Angels	2–10	Sandoval (1–1)	**Puk** (0–2)	Zuñiga (1)	8,573	0–7	L7
8	April 4	@ Cardinals	5–8	Gallegos (1–0)	**Sánchez** (0–1)	Helsley (2)	47,273	0–8	L8
9	April 6	@ Cardinals	1–3	Matz (1–0)	**Rogers** (0–1)	Helsley (3)	37,328	0–9	L9
10	April 7	@ Cardinals	10–3	**Meyer** (1–0)	Gibson (1–1)	—	39,519	1–9	W1
11	April 8	@ Yankees	0–7	Cortés Jr. (1–1)	**Luzardo** (0–2)	—	31,071	1–10	L1
12	April 9	@ Yankees	2–3	Rodón (1–0)	**Puk** (0–3)	Holmes (5)	37,680	1–11	L2
13	April 10	@ Yankees	5–2	**Weathers** (1–1)	Stroman (1–1)	**Scott** (1)	36,295	2–11	W1
14	April 12	Braves	1–8	Fried (1–0)	**Rogers** (0–2)	—	14,408	2–12	L1
15	April 13	Braves	5–1	**Meyer** (2–0)	Sale (1–1)	—	22,327	3–12	W1
16	April 14	Braves	7–9	Minter (2–1)	**Scott** (0–3)	Iglesias (3)	20,757	3–13	L1
17	April 15	Giants	3–4	Harrison (2–1)	**Soriano** (0–1)	Doval (2)	8,290	3–14	L2
18	April 16	Giants	6–3	**Weathers** (2–1)	Walker (1–2)	**Scott** (2)	8,076	4–14	W1
19	April 17	Giants	1–3	Winn (1–3)	**Cronin** (0–2)	Doval (3)	8,179	4–15	L1
—	April 18	@ Cubs	Postponed (rain); Makeup: April 20						
20	April 19	@ Cubs	3–8	Taillon (1–0)	**Puk** (0–4)	—	29,595	4–16	L2
21	April 20 (1)	@ Cubs	3–2	**Faucher** (1–0)	Alzolay (1–2)	**Scott** (3)	36,379	5–16	W1
22	April 20 (2)	@ Cubs	3–5	Imanaga (3–0)	**Bender** (0–1)	Neris (1)	32,386	5–17	L1
23	April 21	@ Cubs	6–3	**Cabrera** (1–0)	Hendricks (0–3)	**Scott** (4)	36,067	6–17	W1
24	April 22	@ Braves	0–3	Elder (1–0)	**Weathers** (2–2)	Iglesias (7)	31,572	6–18	L1
25	April 23	@ Braves	0–5	Fried (2–0)	**Rogers** (0–3)	—	33,533	6–19	L2
26	April 24	@ Braves	3–4 (10)	Minter (4–1)	**Scott** (0–4)	—	38,950	6–20	L3
27	April 26	Nationals	1–3	Law (1–1)	**Faucher** (1–1)	Finnegan (8)	10,201	6–21	L4
28	April 27	Nationals	4–11	Barnes (1–0)	**Cabrera** (1–1)	—	12,695	6–22	L5
29	April 28	Nationals	9–12	Law (2–1)	**Bender** (0–2)	Finnegan (9)	15,894	6–23	L6
30	April 29	Nationals	2–7	Irvin (2–2)	**Rogers** (0–4)	—	6,376	6–24	L7
31	April 30	Rockies	7–6 (10)	**Scott** (1–4)	Beeks (2–2)	—	6,706	7–24	W1

May: 14–13 (Home: 8–4; Away: 6–9)

#	Date	Opponent	Score	Win	Loss	Save	Attendance	Record	Box/Streak
32	May 1	Rockies	4–1	**Muñoz** (1–0)	Hudson (0–5)	**Maldonado** (1)	7,171	8–24	W2
33	May 2	Rockies	5–4 (10)	**Smith** (1–0)	Lawrence (1–2)	—	7,540	9–24	W3
34	May 3	@ Athletics	1–3	Sears (2–2)	**Weathers** (2–3)	Erceg (2)	8,533	9–25	L1
35	May 4	@ Athletics	4–20	Blackburn (3–1)	**Rogers** (0–5)	—	7,809	9–26	L2
36	May 5	@ Athletics	12–3	**Smith** (2–0)	Boyle (2–5)	—	12,212	10–26	W1
37	May 6	@ Dodgers	3–6	Yarbrough (3–1)	**Muñoz** (1–1)	Vesia (1)	44,970	10–27	L1
38	May 7	@ Dodgers	2–8	Yamamoto (4–1)	**Cabrera** (1–2)	—	51,496	10–28	L2
39	May 8	@ Dodgers	1–3	Stone (3–1)	**Weathers** (2–4)	Hudson (2)	40,702	10–29	L3
40	May 10	Phillies	2–8	Suárez (7–0)	**Rogers** (0–6)	—	15,119	10–30	L4
41	May 11	Phillies	3–8	Walker (3–0)	**Luzardo** (0–3)	—	13,210	10–31	L5
42	May 12	Phillies	7–6 (10)	**Bender** (1–2)	Soto (0–1)	—	13,001	11–31	W1
43	May 13	@ Tigers	5–6	Faedo (3–1)	**Maldonado** (0–1)	Foley (10)	12,901	11–32	L1
44	May 14	@ Tigers	1–0 (10)	**Scott** (2–4)	Lange (0–3)	**Puk** (1)	16,498	12–32	W1
45	May 15	@ Tigers	2–0	**Rogers** (1–6)	Mize (1–2)	**Scott** (5)	19,806	13–32	W2
46	May 17	Mets	8–0	**Luzardo** (1–3)	Scott (0–2)	—	13,555	14–32	W3
47	May 18	Mets	10–9 (10)	**Scott** (3–4)	López (1–1)	—	15,304	15–32	W4
48	May 19	Mets	3–7	Manaea (3–1)	**Sánchez** (0–2)	Garrett (2)	19,946	15–33	L1
49	May 20	Brewers	3–2 (10)	**Scott** (4–4)	White (1–1)	—	8,255	16–33	W1
50	May 21	Brewers	5–7	Myers (1–2)	**Puk** (0–5)	Megill (7)	6,799	16–34	L1
51	May 22	Brewers	1–0	**Luzardo** (2–3)	Peralta (3–3)	**Scott** (6)	7,792	17–34	W1
52	May 24	@ Diamondbacks	3–0	**Garrett** (1–0)	Gallen (5–4)	—	22,642	18–34	W2
53	May 25	@ Diamondbacks	2–3	Montgomery (3–2)	**Sánchez** (0–3)	Sewald (4)	31,966	18–35	L1
54	May 26	@ Diamondbacks	3–1	**Weathers** (3–4)	Ginkel (2–1)	**Scott** (7)	25,723	19–35	W1
55	May 27	@ Padres	1–2	Morejón (1–0)	**Puk** (0–6)	Suárez (16)	38,745	19–36	L1
56	May 28	@ Padres	0–4	Waldron (3–5)	**Luzardo** (2–4)	—	41,032	19–37	L2
57	May 29	@ Padres	9–1	**Garrett** (2–0)	Darvish (4–3)	—	32,227	20–37	W1
58	May 31	Rangers	8–2	**Cronin** (1–2)	Ureña (1–5)	—	11,687	21–37	W2

June: 9–17 (Home: 5–8; Away: 4–9)

#	Date	Opponent	Score	Win	Loss	Save	Attendance	Record	Box/Streak
59	June 1	Rangers	0–7	Lorenzen (3–3)	**Weathers** (3–5)	—	21,388	21–38	L1
60	June 2	Rangers	0–6	Heaney (2–6)	**Rogers** (1–7)	—	13,351	21–39	L2
61	June 4	Rays	5–9	Pepiot (4–2)	**Luzardo** (2–5)	Fairbanks (7)	9,234	21–40	L3
62	June 5	Rays	3–5	Lovelady (2–4)	**Garrett** (2–1)	Fairbanks (8)	8,778	21–41	L4
63	June 7	Guardians	3–2	**Scott** (5–4)	Smith (3–1)	—	10,718	22–41	W1
64	June 8	Guardians	0–8	Lively (6–2)	**Muñoz** (1–2)	Ávila (1)	15,669	22–42	L1
65	June 9	Guardians	3–6	Sandlin (5–0)	**Puk** (0–7)	—	12,850	22–43	L2
66	June 11	@ Mets	4–2	**Luzardo** (3–5)	Megill (1–3)	Scott (8)	22,070	23–43	W1
67	June 12	@ Mets	4–10	Peterson (2–0)	**Garrett** (2–2)	—	19,803	23–44	L1
68	June 13	@ Mets	2–3	Díaz (2–1)	**Scott** (5–5)	—	22,485	23–45	L2
69	June 14	@ Nationals	1–8	Gore (6–5)	**Anderson** (0–1)	—	23,303	23–46	L3
70	June 15	@ Nationals	0–4	Herz (1–1)	**Rogers** (1–8)	—	25,637	23–47	L4
71	June 16	@ Nationals	1–3	Parker (5–3)	**Luzardo** (3–6)	Finnegan (20)	27,003	23–48	L5
72	June 17	Cardinals	6–7 (12)	Kittredge (1–3)	**Puk** (0–8)	—	9,460	23–49	L6
73	June 18	Cardinals	9–8 (10)	**Faucher** (2–1)	Roycroft (1–1)	—	8,850	24–49	W1
74	June 19	Cardinals	4–3	**Scott** (6–5)	Fernandez (0–2)	—	11,830	25–49	W2
75	June 21	Mariners	3–2 (10)	**Bender** (2–2)	Voth (2–1)	—	11,794	26–49	W3
76	June 22	Mariners	0–9	Gilbert (5–4)	**Anderson** (0–2)	—	13,217	26–50	L1
77	June 23	Mariners	6–4	**Puk** (1–8)	Miller (6–6)	**Scott** (9)	13,540	27–50	W1
78	June 24	@ Royals	1–4	Ragans (5–5)	**Muñoz** (1–3)	McArthur (13)	16,817	27–51	L1
79	June 25	@ Royals	2–1	**Puk** (2–8)	Hernández (0–1)	**Scott** (10)	16,119	28–51	W1
80	June 26	@ Royals	1–5	Zerpa (1–0)	**Brazobán** (0–1)	—	14,132	28–52	L1
81	June 27	@ Phillies	7–4	**Bender** (3–2)	Hoffman (3–1)	**Scott** (11)	43,507	29–52	W1
82	June 28	@ Phillies	0–2	Sánchez (6–3)	**Tyler** (0–1)	—	44,252	29–53	L1
83	June 29	@ Phillies	3–2	**Nardi** (1–0)	Nola (9–4)	**Scott** (12)	44,117	30–53	W1
84	June 30	@ Phillies	6–7	Domínguez (3–2)	**Nardi** (1–1)	Hoffman (6)	43,222	30–54	L1

July: 10–14 (Home: 6–7; Away: 4–7)

#	Date	Opponent	Score	Win	Loss	Save	Attendance	Record	Box/Streak
85	July 2	Red Sox	3–8	Crawford (4–7)	**Bellozo** (0–1)	—	14,676	30–55	L2
86	July 3	Red Sox	2–7	Bello (8–5)	**Rogers** (1–9)	—	20,285	30–56	L3
87	July 4	Red Sox	5–6 (12)	Kelly (3–1)	**Andriese** (0–1)	Weissert (1)	20,539	30–57	L4
88	July 5	White Sox	2–3	Thorpe (3–1)	**Hoeing** (0–1)	Kopech (8)	10,136	30–58	L5
89	July 6	White Sox	4–3	**Brazobán** (1–1)	Soroka (0–9)	**Scott** (13)	13,409	31–58	W1
90	July 7	White Sox	7–4	**Chargois** (1–0)	Kopech (2–8)	—	12,268	32–58	W2
91	July 9	@ Astros	3–4	Blanco (9–3)	**Brazobán** (1–2)	Hader (16)	34,776	32–59	L1
92	July 10	@ Astros	1–9	Valdez (8–5)	**Hoeing** (0–2)	—	32,715	32–60	L2
93	July 11	@ Astros	3–6	Scott (6–2)	**Muñoz** (1–4)	Hader (17)	38,818	32–61	L3
94	July 12	@ Reds	4–7	Spiers (3–2)	**Chirinos** (0–1)	—	31,326	32–62	L4
95	July 13	@ Reds	6–10	Moll (1–1)	**Cabrera** (1–3)	—	26,219	32–63	L5
96	July 14	@ Reds	3–2	**Puk** (3–8)	Cruz (3–7)	**Scott** (14)	28,514	33–63	W1
97	July 19	Mets	6–4	**Bender** (4–2)	Manaea (6–4)	**Scott** (15)	16,524	34–63	W2
98	July 20	Mets	0–1	Severino (7–3)	**Muñoz** (1–5)	Díaz (11)	21,902	34–64	L1
99	July 21	Mets	4–2	**Cronin** (2–2)	Scott (0–3)	**Scott** (16)	19,418	35–64	W1
100	July 22	Mets	4–6	Peterson (5–0)	**Chirinos** (0–2)	Díaz (12)	13,068	35–65	L1
101	July 23	Orioles	6–3	**Puk** (4–8)	Suárez (5–4)	**Scott** (17)	10,410	36–65	W1
102	July 24	Orioles	6–3	**Nardi** (2–1)	Webb (1–5)	**Scott** (18)	12,127	37–65	W2
103	July 25	Orioles	6–7 (10)	Canó (4–2)	**Faucher** (2–2)	Pérez (2)	17,989	37–66	L1
104	July 26	@ Brewers	6–2	**Rogers** (2–9)	Peralta (6–6)	—	30,128	38–66	W1
105	July 27	@ Brewers	7–3	**Hoeing** (1–2)	Koenig (8–2)	—	36,171	39–66	W2
106	July 28	@ Brewers	2–6	Junis (4–0)	**Tyler** (0–2)	—	32,946	39–67	L1
107	July 30	@ Rays	3–9	Alexander (4–3)	**Cronin** (2–3)	—	17,931	39–68	L2
108	July 31	@ Rays	6–2	**Muñoz** (2–5)	Bradley (6–5)	—	14,484	40–68	W1

August: 10–18 (Home: 3–10; Away: 7–8)

#	Date	Opponent	Score	Win	Loss	Save	Attendance	Record	Box/Streak
109	August 1	@ Braves	2–4	Morton (6–6)	**Meyer** (2–1)	Iglesias (23)	34,401	40–69	L1
110	August 2	@ Braves	3–5	Bummer (3–2)	**Faucher** (2–3)	Jiménez (3)	37,726	40–70	L2
111	August 3	@ Braves	4–3	**Cronin** (3–3)	Johnson (4–3)	**Faucher** (1)	40,479	41–70	W1
112	August 4	@ Braves	7–0	**Cabrera** (2–3)	Fried (7–6)	—	33,146	42–70	W2
113	August 5	Reds	3–10	Martinez (6–5)	**Muñoz** (2–6)	—	9,460	42–71	L1
114	August 6	Reds	2–8	Lodolo (9–4)	**Meyer** (2–2)	—	7,948	42–72	L2
115	August 7	Reds	6–4	**Bellozo** (1–1)	Abbott (9–9)	**Faucher** (2)	8,657	43–72	W1
116	August 8	Reds	4–10 (10)	Farmer (1–0)	**Ramírez** (0–1)	—	8,728	43–73	L1
117	August 9	Padres	2–6 (10)	Adam (7–2)	**de Geus** (0–1)	—	12,721	43–74	L2
118	August 10	Padres	8–9 (10)	Suárez (7–1)	**McMillon** (0–1)	Scott (19)	20,223	43–75	L3
119	August 11	Padres	7–6	**Meyer** (3–2)	Cease (11–9)	**Soriano** (1)	15,699	44–75	W1
120	August 13	@ Phillies	5–0	**Bellozo** (2–1)	Walker (3–4)	—	42,846	45–75	W2
121	August 14	@ Phillies	5–9	Ruiz (3–1)	**Cabrera** (2–4)	—	42,577	45–76	L1
122	August 16	@ Mets	3–7	Manaea (9–5)	**Muñoz** (2–7)	—	32,311	45–77	L2
123	August 17	@ Mets	0–4	Severino (8–6)	**Meyer** (3–3)	—	34,744	45–78	L3
124	August 18	@ Mets	3–2	**Nardi** (3–1)	Garrett (7–5)	**Faucher** (3)	30,596	46–78	W1
125	August 19	Diamondbacks	6–9	Pfaadt (8–6)	**Oller** (0–1)	—	7,318	46–79	L1
126	August 20	Diamondbacks	1–3	Rodríguez (2–0)	**Cabrera** (2–5)	Martínez (4)	6,794	46–80	L2
127	August 21	Diamondbacks	8–10	Floro (5–3)	**Nardi** (3–2)	Martínez (5)	8,248	46–81	L3
128	August 23	Cubs	3–6	Hodge (2–1)	**de Geus** (0–2)	López (4)	13,992	46–82	L4
129	August 24	Cubs	2–14	Imanaga (10–3)	**Bellozo** (2–2)	—	18,138	46–83	L5
130	August 25	Cubs	7–2	**Oller** (1–1)	Assad (6–4)	—	17,275	47–83	W1
131	August 26	@ Rockies	2–3	Bird (2–2)	**Cabrera** (2–6)	Kinley (7)	20,338	47–84	L1
132	August 27	@ Rockies	9–8	**Soriano** (1–1)	Chivilli (1–2)	**Faucher** (4)	20,284	48–84	W1
133	August 28	@ Rockies	2–8	Freeland (4–6)	**Meyer** (3–4)	—	20,526	48–85	L1
134	August 29	@ Rockies	12–8	**Tinoco** (1–0)	Blalock (1–1)	—	20,949	49–85	W1
135	August 30	@ Giants	1–3	Rogers (3–4)	**Baumann** (3–1)	Walker (5)	33,606	49–86	L1
136	August 31	@ Giants	4–3	**Cabrera** (3–6)	Black (0–2)	**Faucher** (5)	36,087	50–86	W1

September: 12–14 (Home: 5–7; Away: 7–7)

#	Date	Opponent	Score	Win	Loss	Save	Attendance	Record	Box/Streak
137	September 1	@ Giants	7–5	**Curry** (1–2)	Webb (11–9)	**Faucher** (6)	41,187	51–86	W2
138	September 3	Nationals	2–6	Corbin (5–12)	**Meyer** (3–5)	—	6,854	51–87	L1
139	September 4	Nationals	4–3 (10)	**McMillon** (1–1)	Law (7–3)	—	6,156	52–87	W1
140	September 5	Phillies	2–5	Suárez (12–6)	**Oller** (1–2)	Strahm (3)	9,355	52–88	L1
141	September 6	Phillies	2–16	Wheeler (14–6)	**Kitchen** (0–1)	—	15,963	52–89	L2
142	September 7	Phillies	9–5	**McMillon** (2–1)	Nola (12–7)	—	23,189	53–89	W1
143	September 8	Phillies	10–1	**Cabrera** (4–6)	Johnson (0–1)	—	15,202	54–89	W2
144	September 9	@ Pirates	2–3	Skenes (10–2)	**Bellozo** (2–3)	Chapman (7)	10,311	54–90	L1
145	September 10	@ Pirates	4–6	Wentz (1–2)	**Oller** (1–3)	Chapman (8)	10,391	54–91	L2
146	September 11	@ Pirates	1–3	Falter (8–7)	**Bermúdez** (0–1)	Beeks (10)	10,252	54–92	L3
147	September 12	@ Nationals	6–3	**Bender** (5–2)	Law (7–4)	**Tinoco** (1)	13,299	55–92	W1
148	September 13	@ Nationals	1–4	Herz (4–7)	**Cabrera** (4–7)	Finnegan (37)	20,584	55–93	L1
149	September 14	@ Nationals	1–4	Corbin (6–13)	**Bellozo** (2–4)	Finnegan (38)	28,175	55–94	L2
150	September 15	@ Nationals	3–4	Gore (9–12)	**Oller** (1–4)	Ferrer (1)	18,265	55–95	L3
151	September 17	Dodgers	11–9	**Veneziano** (1–0)	Grove (4–4)	—	17,902	56–95	W1
152	September 18	Dodgers	4–8	Knack (3–4)	**Weathers** (3–6)	—	17,138	56–96	L1
153	September 19	Dodgers	4–20	Flaherty (13–7)	**Cabrera** (4–8)	—	15,584	56–97	L2
154	September 20	Braves	4–3	**Bellozo** (3–4)	Morton (8–9)	**Tinoco** (2)	17,139	57–97	W1
155	September 21	Braves	2–6	Fried (10–10)	**Bachar** (0–1)	—	25,225	57–98	L1
156	September 22	Braves	4–5	Johnson (6–5)	**Cronin** (3–4)	Iglesias (32)	20,104	57–99	L2
157	September 24	@ Twins	4–1	**Weathers** (4–6)	Ober (12–8)	**Tinoco** (3)	21,983	58–99	W1
158	September 25	@ Twins	3–8	Jax (5–5)	**Petersen** (3–1)	—	18,162	58–100	L1
159	September 26	@ Twins	8–6 (13)	**Maldonado** (1–1)	Blewett (1–1)	**McCaughan** (1)	17,341	59–100	W1
160	September 27	@ Blue Jays	15–5	**Oller** (2–4)	Berríos (16–11)	—	31,597	60–100	W2
161	September 28	@ Blue Jays	8–1	**Curry** (2–2)	Rodríguez (1–8)	**McCaughan** (2)	35,733	61–100	W3
162	September 29	@ Blue Jays	3–1	**Weathers** (5–6)	Burr (0–2)	**Bender** (1)	31,688	62–100	W4

== Farm system ==
Level	Team	League	Manager
Triple-A	Jacksonville Jumbo Shrimp	International League	Daren Brown
Double-A	Pensacola Blue Wahoos	Southern League	Kevin Randel
High-A	Beloit Sky Carp	Midwest League	Billy Gardner Jr.
Low-A	Jupiter Hammerheads	Florida State League	Nelson Prada
Rookie	FCL Marlins	Florida Complex League	Luis Dorante
Rookie	DSL Marlins	Dominican Summer League	Oscar Escobar; Carlos Mota
