= Jonathan Bermúdez =

Puerto Rican baseball player (born 1995)

El Águila de Veracruz – No. 2
- Pitcher
- Born: October 16, 1995 (age 30); Coamo, Puerto Rico
- Bats: Left Throws: Left

Professional debut
- MLB: August 27, 2024, for the Miami Marlins
- CPBL: April 4, 2025, for the Rakuten Monkeys

MLB statistics (through 2024 season)
- Win–loss record: 0–1
- Earned run average: 8.10
- Strikeouts: 4

CPBL statistics (through 2025 season)
- Win–loss record: 3–4
- Earned run average: 4.75
- Strikeouts: 33
- Stats at Baseball Reference

Teams
- Miami Marlins (2024); Rakuten Monkeys (2025)

Jonathan Alberto Bermúdez (born October 16, 1995) is a Puerto Rican professional baseball pitcher for El Águila de Veracruz of the Mexican League. He has previously played in Major League Baseball (MLB) for the Miami Marlins, and in the Chinese Professional Baseball League (CPBL) for the Rakuten Monkeys.

== Career ==
Bermúdez was born in Coamo, Puerto Rico. He played college baseball at Saint Leo University and Southeastern University. In 2018 pitching for Southeastern he was 15–2 with a 1.95 ERA in 110.2 innings, and led the Sun Conference with 153 strikeouts.

=== Houston Astros ===
Bermúdez was drafted by the Houston Astros in the 23rd round, 702nd overall, of the 2018 Major League Baseball draft. He made his professional debut with the rookie-level Gulf Coast Astros.

He split the 2019 season between the Single-A Quad Cities River Bandits and the Double-A Corpus Christi Hooks, posting a combined 6-3 record and 3.71 ERA with 93 strikeouts in 77.2 innings pitched. Bermúdez did not play in a game in 2020 due to the cancellation of the minor league season because of the COVID-19 pandemic. He spent the 2021 season split between Corpus Christi and the Triple-A Sugar Land Skeeters, logging a cumulative 5-6 record and 3.24 ERA with 146 strikeouts in 111.0 innings pitched.

On November 19, 2021, the Astros added Bermúdez to their 40-man roster to protect him from the Rule 5 draft. He began the season with the Triple-A Sugar Land Space Cowboys, struggling to a 2-4 record and 8.96 ERA with 65 strikeouts in 67.1 innings pitched. On August 20, 2022, Bermúdez was designated for assignment by Houston following the promotion of David Hensley.

=== San Francisco Giants ===
On August 23, 2022, Bermúdez was claimed off waivers by the San Francisco Giants. On September 1, Bermúdez was removed from the 40-man roster and sent outright to the Triple-A Sacramento River Cats. Spending the remainder of the year with Sacramento, he was 0–3 in five starts with a 9.22 ERA over 13.2 innings in which he gave up seven home runs and struck out 16 batters. Bermúdez was released by the Giants on March 27, 2023.

=== Miami Marlins ===
On April 26, 2023, Bermúdez signed a minor league contract with the Miami Marlins organization. In 19 games (18 starts) for the Double–A Pensacola Blue Wahoos, he registered a 5–5 record and 4.58 ERA with 109 strikeouts across 94 1/3 innings pitched.

Bermúdez made 20 appearances (17 starts) split between Pensacola and the Triple–A Jacksonville Jumbo Shrimp to begin the 2024 campaign, accumulating a 4–6 record and 3.48 ERA with 98 strikeouts over 98 1/3 innings of work. On August 25, 2024, Bermúdez was selected to the 40-man roster and promoted to the major leagues for the first time. He made his debut on August 27, tossing 3 2/3 innings of relief against the Colorado Rockies. Bermúdez was designated for assignment by the Marlins on August 31. He cleared waivers and was sent outright to Jacksonville on September 2. On September 7, Bermúdez was added back to the major league roster. After two more appearances for Miami, he was designated for assignment on September 12. Bermúdez cleared waivers and was sent outright to Jacksonville on September 14. He elected free agency on October 10.

=== Rakuten Monkeys ===
On December 25, 2024, Bermúdez signed with the Rakuten Monkeys of the Chinese Professional Baseball League. He made nine starts for Rakuten in 2025, compiling a 3-4 record and 4.75 ERA with 33 strikeouts across 41 2/3 innings pitched. Bermúdez was released by the Monkeys on August 28, 2025.

=== El Águila de Veracruz ===
On February 25, 2026, Bermúdez signed with El Águila de Veracruz of the Mexican League.
