= Kyle Tyler =

American baseball player (born 1996)

Free agent
- Pitcher
- Born: December 27, 1996 (age 29); Oklahoma City, Oklahoma, U.S.
- Bats: Right Throws: Right

MLB debut
- September 5, 2021, for the Los Angeles Angels

MLB statistics (through 2024 season)
- Win–loss record: 1–2
- Earned run average: 4.31
- Strikeouts: 33
- Stats at Baseball Reference

Teams
- Los Angeles Angels (2021); San Diego Padres (2022); Miami Marlins (2024)

Kyle Wade Tyler (born December 27, 1996) is an American professional baseball pitcher who is a free agent. He has previously played in Major League Baseball (MLB) for the Los Angeles Angels, San Diego Padres, and Miami Marlins.

== Amateur career ==
Tyler attended Westmoore High School in Oklahoma City, Oklahoma, where he was named the Oklahoma Gatorade Player of the Year as a senior after going 10–0 with a 0.70 ERA and 102 strikeouts over sixty innings. After graduating, he played college baseball at the University of Oklahoma where he went 6–2 with a 2.97 ERA over 66 2/3 innings as a junior. Following the end of his junior year, he was selected by the Los Angeles Angels in the 20th round of the 2018 Major League Baseball draft.

== Professional career ==
=== Los Angeles Angels ===
Tyler signed and made his professional debut with the Orem Owlz of the Rookie Advanced Pioneer League, posting a 5.11 ERA over 24 2/3 innings. In 2019, he played with the Burlington Bees of the Single–A Midwest League and was promoted to the Inland Empire 66ers of the High–A California League during the season. Over 25 games (18 starts) with both teams, he went 10–1 with a 2.59 ERA and 106 strikeouts. Tyler did not play in a game in 2020 due to the cancellation of the minor league season because of the COVID-19 pandemic. He began the 2021 season with the Rocket City Trash Pandas of the Double-A South and was promoted to the Salt Lake Bees of the Triple-A West in early August. Over twenty games (14 starts) between both clubs, Tyler went 6–4 with a 3.66 ERA and 92 strikeouts over 86 innings.

On August 28, 2021, the Angels selected Tyler's contract and promoted him to the major leagues. He made his MLB debut on September 5 at Angel Stadium against the Texas Rangers, throwing three scoreless innings of relief while giving up one hit and striking out two. Tyler pitched a total of 12 1/3 innings for the Angels in 2021, giving up four runs while both walking and striking out six.

On March 19, 2022, Tyler was designated for assignment by the Angels to make room for new signee Ryan Tepera. The Boston Red Sox claimed Tyler off waivers from the Angels on March 22. Upon being claimed, he was optioned to the Triple-A Worcester Red Sox. Two days later, the Red Sox designated Tyler for assignment to free roster space for Ralph Garza Jr. On March 26, Tyler was claimed off of waivers by the San Diego Padres. The Padres designated Tyler for assignment on April 7. The following day, he was claimed off of waivers by the Angels. On April 10, Tyler was designated for assignment by the Angels.

=== San Diego Padres ===
On April 12, 2022, Tyler was claimed off of waivers by the Padres. He was then optioned to the El Paso Chihuahuas of the Triple-A Pacific Coast League. He posted a 5.51 ERA and 1.55 WHIP in 16.1 innings pitched across 11 appearances for El Paso. He was designated for assignment by San Diego on June 6. He cleared waivers and was sent outright to El Paso on June 9.

On June 12, 2022, Tyler was selected back to the active roster. On June 14, Tyler recorded his first career win in a game against the Chicago Cubs. He came in to pitch in relief of Sean Manaea, tossing two scoreless innings and striking out one omen route to the victory. He made two scoreless appearances for the Padres before he was designated for assignment on July 3. He cleared waivers and was sent outright to Triple-A on July 6, but rejected the assignment and instead elected free agency.

=== San Francisco Giants ===
On July 16, 2022, Tyler signed a minor league deal with the San Francisco Giants. He made four appearances for the Triple-A Sacramento River Cats, but struggled to a 9.82 ERA with 6 strikeouts in 3 2/3 innings pitched. He was released on August 7.

=== Seattle Mariners ===
On February 1, 2023, Tyler signed a minor league contract with the Seattle Mariners organization. He made 27 appearances (26 starts) for the Double–A Arkansas Travelers, registering a 7–11 record and 5.60 ERA with 138 strikeouts in 135 innings pitched. Tyler elected free agency following the season on November 6.

=== Miami Marlins ===
On November 30, 2023, Tyler signed a minor league contract with the Miami Marlins. On April 20, 2024, Tyler was selected to the major league roster. He made one appearance for Miami, allowing two runs on one hit with one strikeout in two innings of work against the Washington Nationals. On April 27, Tyler was designated for assignment following the promotion of Kent Emanuel. He cleared waivers and was sent outright to the Triple–A Jacksonville Jumbo Shrimp on April 29. On June 23, Tyler had his contract purchased back to the major league roster. In 8 games (7 starts), he compiled a 5.40 ERA with 25 strikeouts over 31 2/3 innings pitched. On August 9, Tyler was designated for assignment by Miami.

=== Philadelphia Phillies ===
On August 11, 2024, Tyler was claimed off waivers by the Philadelphia Phillies and optioned to the Triple-A Lehigh Valley IronPigs. In 7 starts for Lehigh, he compiled a 1–2 record and 5.82 ERA with 36 strikeouts over 34 innings of work.

Tyler was optioned to Triple-A Lehigh Valley to begin the 2025 season. In 12 starts, he compiled a 5–3 record and 4.31 ERA with 43 strikeouts across 62 2/3 innings pitched. Tyler was designated for assignment following the acquisition of Ryan Cusick on June 8, 2025.

=== Baltimore Orioles ===
On June 15, 2025, Tyler was claimed off waivers by the Baltimore Orioles. In two appearances for the Triple-A Norfolk Tides, he recorded a 2.25 ERA with three strikeouts over four innings of work. On June 28, Tyler was designated for assignment by the Orioles. He elected free agency after clearing waivers on July 1.

=== Chicago White Sox ===
On July 7, 2025, Tyler signed a minor league contract with the Chicago White Sox. He made 12 appearances for the Triple-A Charlotte Knights, posting an 0-2 record and 6.58 ERA with 23 strikeouts over 26 innings of work; Tyler also made two starts for the rookie-level Arizona Complex League White Sox. Tyler elected free agency following the season on November 6.

=== CTBC Brothers ===
On December 15, 2025, Tyler signed with the CTBC Brothers of the Chinese Professional Baseball League. He was released on August 31, 2026, without appearing in a major league game for the Brothers.
