= Eli Villalobos =

American baseball player (born 1997)

Free agent
- Pitcher
- Born: June 26, 1997 (age 29); La Habra, California, U.S.
- Bats: Right Throws: Right

MLB debut
- May 5, 2024, for the Miami Marlins

MLB statistics (through 2024 season)
- Win–loss record: 0–0
- Earned run average: 0.00
- Strikeouts: 1
- Stats at Baseball Reference

Teams
- Miami Marlins (2024)

Elijah Daniel Villalobos (born June 26, 1997) is an American professional baseball pitcher who is a free agent. He has previously played in Major League Baseball (MLB) for the Miami Marlins.

== Career ==
Villalobos attended Sonora High School in La Habra, California. He began his college baseball as a catcher at Golden West College. After a coach saw him play as a pitcher in collegiate summer baseball, Villalobos transferred to California State University, Long Beach to play for the Long Beach State Dirtbags.

=== Miami Marlins ===
The Miami Marlins selected Villalobos in the 14th round of the 2018 Major League Baseball draft. Villalobos split his first professional season between three minor league affiliates. In 16 games between the rookie-level Gulf Coast Marlins, Low-A Batavia Muckdogs, and High-A Jupiter Hammerheads, he recorded a cumulative 1-1 record and 6.10 ERA with 19 strikeouts in 20.2 innings pitched. He returned to Batavia in 2019, pitching to an 0-3 record and 6.08 ERA with 48 strikeouts in 47.1 innings of work.

On November 15, 2022, the Marlins added Villalobos to their 40-man roster to protect him from the Rule 5 draft. Villalobos was optioned to the Triple-A Jacksonville Jumbo Shrimp to begin the 2023 season. He struggled to an 11.57 ERA in three appearances before he was designated for assignment by the Marlins on April 9, 2023.

=== Pittsburgh Pirates ===
On April 11, 2023, Villalobos was claimed off waivers by the Pittsburgh Pirates. In 16 appearances for the Triple–A Indianapolis Indians, he registered a 4.15 ERA with 16 strikeouts in 17 1/3 innings pitched. He was designated for assignment by the Pirates on June 19, following the promotion of Henry Davis.

=== Miami Marlins (second stint) ===
On June 26, 2023, Villalobos was claimed off waivers by the Miami Marlins, marking his second stint with the organization. He was subsequently optioned to the Double–A Pensacola Blue Wahoos. On July 2, Villalobos was again designated for assignment following the promotion of Dane Myers. He cleared waivers and was sent outright to Double–A on July 4.

Villalobos began the 2024 season with Triple–A Jacksonville, recording a 4.73 ERA with 16 strikeouts across 9 games. On May 5, 2024, Villalobos was selected to the 40–man roster and promoted to the major leagues for the first time. In 3 games for Miami, he compiled a 2.08 ERA with 3 strikeouts across 4 1/3 innings pitched. On May 27, Villalobos was designated for assignment by the Marlins. He cleared waivers and was sent outright to Jacksonville on May 31, but elected free agency the following day.

=== Detroit Tigers ===
On June 17, 2024, Villalobos signed a minor league contract with the Detroit Tigers. He made 6 total appearances split between the rookie–level Florida Complex League Tigers, Single–A Lakeland Flying Tigers, and Triple–A Toledo Mud Hens. Villalobos was released by the Tigers organization on September 13.

=== Dorados de Chihuahua ===
On April 15, 2025, Villalobos signed with the Dorados de Chihuahua of the Mexican League. Villalobos made 43 appearances for Chihuahua, compiling a 1-1 record and 3.40 ERA with 34 strikeouts across 39 2/3 innings pitched.

=== San Diego Padres ===
On February 13, 2026, Villalobos signed a minor league contract with the San Diego Padres. In 12 games with Triple-A El Paso Chihuahuas he threw 15.2 innings going 2-1 with a 5.74 ERA and 14 strikeouts. He elected free agency on November 2.
