= Darren McCaughan =

American baseball player (born 1996)

Free agent
- Pitcher
- Born: March 18, 1996 (age 30); Long Beach, California, U.S.
- Bats: Right Throws: Right

MLB debut
- July 21, 2021, for the Seattle Mariners

MLB statistics (through 2025 season)
- Win–loss record: 0–0
- Earned run average: 6.02
- Strikeouts: 46
- Stats at Baseball Reference

Teams
- Seattle Mariners (2021, 2023); Miami Marlins (2024); Cleveland Guardians (2024); Miami Marlins (2024); Minnesota Twins (2025)

Darren Scott McCaughan (/ˌmɪˈkækən/ mi-KAK-ən; born March 18, 1996) is an American professional baseball pitcher who is a free agent. He has previously played in Major League Baseball (MLB) for the Seattle Mariners, Miami Marlins, Cleveland Guardians, and Minnesota Twins. He made his MLB debut in 2021 for the Mariners.

== Amateur career ==
McCaughan attended Los Alamitos High School in Los Alamitos, California. He committed to play college baseball at Long Beach State University during his junior year in 2013. As a junior, he went 6–4 with a 2.96 ERA. Undrafted out of high school in the 2014 MLB draft, he enrolled at Long Beach State where he played college baseball for the Dirtbags.

As a freshman at Long Beach State in 2015, McCaughan went 4–2 with a 2.47 ERA in 23 games (three starts). In 2016, as a sophomore, he pitched to a 10–1 record with a 2.03 ERA in 16 starts, earning the title of Big West Pitcher of the Year. He was named an All-American by multiple outlets including Collegiate Baseball and Perfect Game. That summer, he played for the USA Baseball Collegiate National Team. In 2017, a junior, McCaughan had a 9–2 record with a 2.50 ERA in 17 starts. He was named Big West Pitcher of the Year for the second consecutive year along with being named a second-team All-American by Collegiate Baseball and third-team All-American by D1Baseball.

== Professional career ==
=== Seattle Mariners ===
The Seattle Mariners drafted McCaughan in the 12th round of the 2017 MLB draft. He signed with Seattle and made his professional with the Rookie-level Arizona League Mariners, going 0–1 with a 3.75 ERA in 12 innings. He spent the 2018 season with the Modesto Nuts of the High-A California League, where he pitched to a 6–10 record and a 3.05 ERA in 25 starts and was named an All-Star. He also made one spot start for the Tacoma Rainiers of the Triple-A Pacific Coast League in June. He began 2019 with the Arkansas Travelers of the Double-A Texas League, with whom he was named an All-Star alongside earning the title of Texas League Pitcher of the Year after going 7–5 with a 2.89 ERA over 17 starts. In July, he was promoted to Tacoma, going 0–6 with an 8.09 ERA over nine starts.

McCaughan did not play a minor league game in 2020 due to the cancellation of the minor league season caused by the COVID-19 pandemic. He returned to Arkansas to begin the 2021 season, now members of the Double-A Central. After one start, he was promoted to Tacoma, now a part of the Triple-A West. On July 21, 2021, McCaughan was selected to the 40-man roster and promoted to the major leagues for the first time. He made his MLB debut that day pitching in relief against the Colorado Rockies, throwing five innings in which he gave up no hits and one earned run while walking three batters. He made two appearances for Seattle, working to a 8.00 ERA with 2 strikeouts. On October 22, the Mariners removed him from the 40-man roster and sent him outright to Tacoma.

In 2022, McCaughan made 28 starts for Tacoma, posting an 8-9 record and 4.55 ERA with 141 strikeouts in 154 1/3 innings pitched. He was assigned to Tacoma to begin the 2023 season.

On April 11, 2023, McCaughan had his contract selected to the active roster. In three appearances for Seattle, he recorded a 5.40 ERA with 10 strikeouts across five innings of work. McCaughan was designated for assignment on February 7, 2024, following the waiver claim of Canaan Smith-Njigba.

=== Miami Marlins ===
On February 9, 2024, Seattle traded McCaughan to the Miami Marlins for cash considerations. He was optioned to the Triple-A Jacksonville Jumbo Shrimp to begin the 2024 season. McCaughan made one appearance for Miami, surrendering eight runs on nine hits with two strikeouts across 4 2/3 innings against the Oakland Athletics. He was designated for assignment by the Marlins on May 5.

=== Cleveland Guardians ===
On May 9, 2024, Miami traded McCaughan to the Cleveland Guardians for cash considerations. In two games for Cleveland, he allowed six runs on nine hits with one strikeout across six innings pitched. Cleveland designated him for assignment on June 30.

=== Miami Marlins (second stint) ===
On July 7, 2024, McCaughan was claimed off waivers by the Miami Marlins. In 10 total games for Miami, he compiled a 5.75 ERA with 27 strikeouts and two saves over 36 innings pitched. On November 1, McCaughan was removed from the 40-man roster sent outright to the minors. He elected free agency the same day.

=== Minnesota Twins ===
On December 4, 2024, McCaughan signed a minor league contract with the Minnesota Twins. On March 31, 2025, the Twins selected McCaughan's contract, adding him to their active roster. In three appearances for Minnesota, he posted a 1.69 ERA with six strikeouts across 5 1/3 innings pitched. McCaughan was designated for assignment following the promotion of Scott Blewett on April 7. He elected free agency after clearing waivers on April 10. However, McCaughan re-signed with the Twins on a minor league contract the following day. On August 4, the Twins added McCaughan back to their active roster. He did not appear for the team and was designated for assignment the next day. McCaughan cleared waivers and was sent outright to Triple-A St. Paul Saints on August 7. He elected free agency on September 29.

=== Cincinnati Reds ===
On January 28, 2026, McCaughan signed a minor league contract with the Cincinnati Reds. He made 14 appearances (including 11 starts) for the Triple-A Louisville Bats, posting a 5–4 record and 9.11 ERA with 51 strikeouts across 55 1/3 innings pitched. McCaughan was released by the Reds organization on June 29.

=== Kansas City Monarchs ===
On July 6, 2026, McCaughan signed with the Kansas City Monarchs of the American Association of Professional Baseball. He made five starts and had a 1-1 record, a 5.76 ERA, and 19 strikeouts across 25 innings.

=== Cleburne Railroaders ===
On August 6, 2026, McCaughan was claimed off waivers by the Cleburne Railroaders of the American Association of Professional Baseball. He did not make an appearance for the team and was released on August 8.
