= Declan Cronin =

American baseball player (born 1997)

Texas Rangers
- Pitcher
- Born: September 24, 1997 (age 29); Glen Ridge, New Jersey, U.S.
- Bats: Right Throws: Right

MLB debut
- July 30, 2023, for the Chicago White Sox

MLB statistics (through 2024 season)
- Win–loss record: 3–5
- Earned run average: 4.98
- Strikeouts: 80
- Stats at Baseball Reference

Teams
- Chicago White Sox (2023); Miami Marlins (2024)

Declan Evans Cronin (born September 24, 1997) is an American professional baseball pitcher in the Texas Rangers organization. He has previously played in Major League Baseball (MLB) for the Chicago White Sox and Miami Marlins.

== Amateur career ==
A native of Montclair, New Jersey, Cronin attended Regis High School, then played college baseball at Holy Cross where he graduated with a Bachelor of Arts in History in 2019. A letterman in each of his four years with the Crusaders, he pitched 177 2/3 innings over 54 appearances, with his 156 strikeouts the 10th-most in program history. Starting 10 of 15 games over 71 innings, his overall record during his senior year was 6–4 with a 4.06 earned run average (ERA) and 61 strikeouts. He also earned All-Patriot League first-team honors after going 5–1 over 46 2/3 innings with a 2.70 ERA which ranked second in conference play. He was the first Holy Cross Crusader to play in an MLB match since Mike Hegan and Mike Pazik in 1977.

In 2018, he played collegiate summer baseball with the Falmouth Commodores of the Cape Cod Baseball League.

== Professional career ==
=== Chicago White Sox ===
Cronin was drafted by the Chicago White Sox in the 36th round, with the 1,070th overall selection, of the 2019 Major League Baseball draft. He spent his first professional season split between the rookie–level Arizona League White Sox and Single–A Kannapolis Intimidators, accumulating a 2.88 ERA across 20 contests.

Cronin did not play in a game in 2020 due to the cancellation of the minor league season because of the COVID-19 pandemic. He returned to action in 2021 with the High–A Winston-Salem Dash and Double–A Birmingham Barons. In 35 appearances out of the bullpen, Cronin registered a 5–2 record and 4.56 ERA with 43 strikeouts across 47 1/3 innings pitched.

Cronin split the 2022 season between Birmingham and the Triple–A Charlotte Knights, making 49 total appearances and logging a 3.71 ERA and 36 strikeouts and 2 saves across 51.0 innings of work. He began the 2023 season back with Charlotte, and recorded a 4.03 ERA in 44 2/3 innings.

On July 28, 2023, Cronin was selected to the 40-man roster and promoted to the major leagues for the first time. In 9 appearances for Chicago in his debut campaign, he allowed 11 runs on 11 hits and 7 walks with 8 strikeouts. On December 28, Cronin was designated for assignment.

=== Miami Marlins ===
On January 4, 2024, Cronin was claimed off waivers by the Houston Astros. He was designated for assignment on January 31, following the waiver claim of Trey Cabbage. He was then claimed by the Miami Marlins on February 7.

In 2024, Cronin made 56 appearances for the Marlins, recording a 4.35 ERA and 72 strikeouts in 70 1/3 innings. He pitched 65 innings before allowing his first home run, a Marlins franchise record and the most innings to start a season without surrendering a home run since 2014. At the conclusion of the 2024 campaign, he was named the Marlins Rookie of the Year by the BBWAA.

Cronin began the 2025 MLB season on the Injured List with a left hip strain. Including rehab outings, he made 23 appearances in 2025, split between the Single-A Jupiter Hammerheads and Triple-A Jacksonville Jumbo Shrimp, accumulating a 1-0 record and 4.63 ERA with 23 strikeouts across 23 1/3 innings pitched. While on the 7-day Injured List with an undisclosed injury, Cronin was released by the Marlins on September 6, 2025.

On September 29, 2025, it was reported that Cronin underwent Tommy John surgery and would miss the 2026 season.

=== Texas Rangers ===
On October 7, 2025, Cronin signed a two-year, minor league contract with the Texas Rangers organization. He did not appear in a game during the 2026 season.

== Personal life ==
Cronin has been the Assistant Director of Operations for Tread Athletics, a Charlotte, North Carolina-based baseball training facility whose clientele includes major-league players and prospects, since 2020.

His hobbies include playing chess. He was playing an online match when he was informed of his promotion to the White Sox.

On December 20th, 2025 he married Paige Monaghan, captain of the Utah Royals of the NWSL.
