= Emmanuel Ramírez =

Dominican baseball player (born 1994)

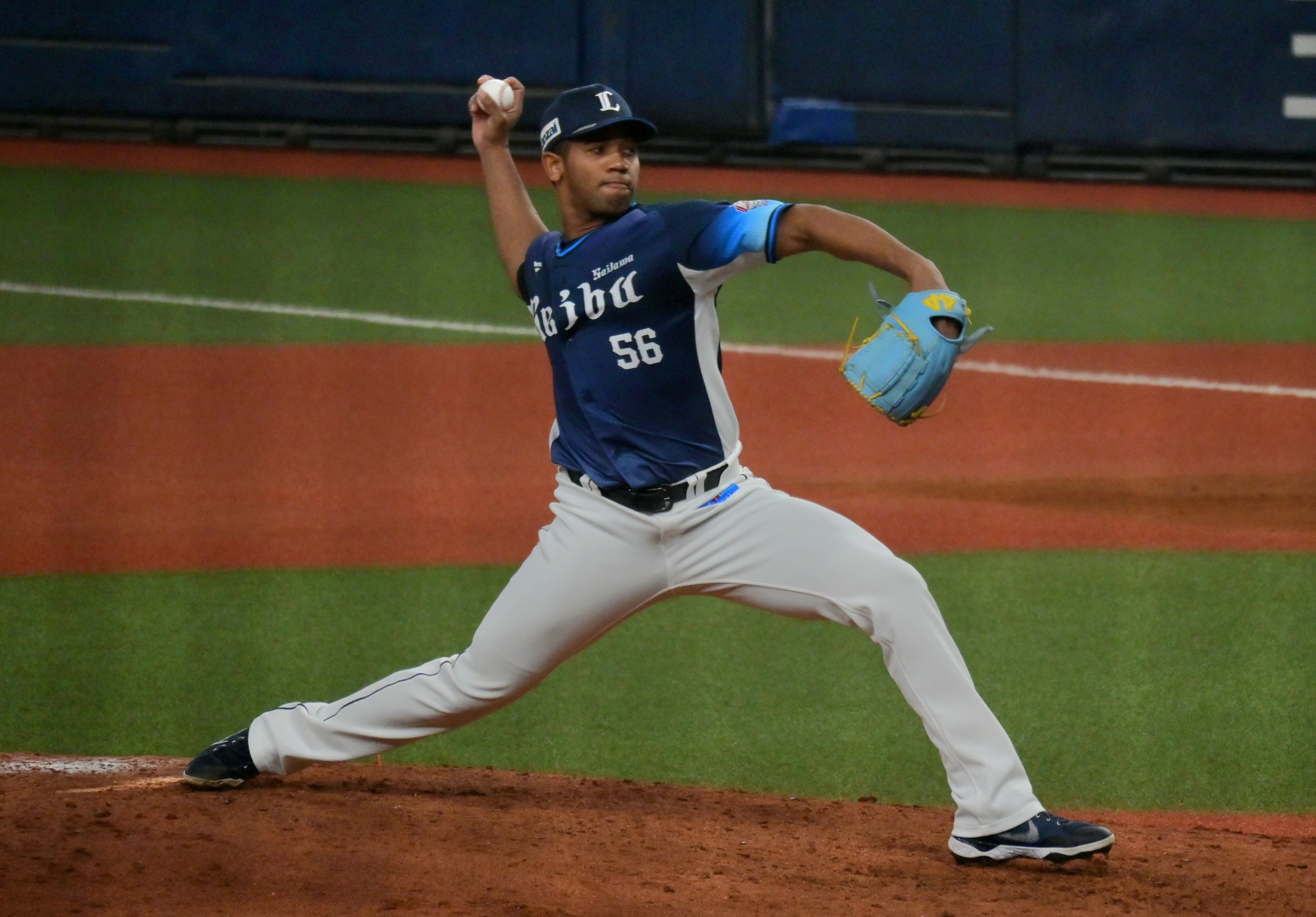
- Ramírez with Saitama Seibu Lions in 2025

Free agent
- Pitcher
- Born: July 15, 1994 (age 32); Puerto Plata, Dominican Republic
- Bats: Right Throws: Right

Professional debut
- MLB: April 28, 2024, for the Miami Marlins
- NPB: March 30, 2025, for the Saitama Seibu Lions

MLB statistics (through 2024 season)
- Win–loss record: 0–1
- Earned run average: 6.97
- Strikeouts: 21

NPB statistics (through 2026 season)
- Win–loss record: 4-1
- Earned run average: 2.09
- Strikeouts: 37
- Stats at Baseball Reference

Teams
- Miami Marlins (2024); Saitama Seibu Lions (2025–2026)

Emmanuel Odalis Ramírez (born July 15, 1994) is a Dominican professional baseball pitcher who is a free agent. He has previously played in Major League Baseball (MLB) for the Miami Marlins he also played in Nippon Professional Baseball (NPB) for the Saitama Seibu Lions.

== Career ==
=== San Diego Padres ===
On November 19, 2012, Ramírez signed with the San Diego Padres as an international free agent. He spent his first three professional seasons with the rookie–level Dominican Summer League Padres, accumulating a 6.88 ERA with 81 strikeouts across 38 total appearances. Ramírez finished the 2015 season with the rookie–level Arizona League Padres (1.51 ERA in 8 games) and Low–A Tri-City Dust Devils (3.00 ERA in 5 starts).

Ramírez split the 2016 season between Tri-City and the Single–A Fort Wayne TinCaps, making 24 combined appearances and logging a 6–4 record and 3.79 ERA with 96 strikeouts across 102 innings pitched. In 2017, Ramírez played for Tri–City, Fort Wayne, and the High–A Lake Elsinore Storm. In 21 games (14 starts) between the three affiliates, he accumulated a 4–5 record and 3.10 ERA with 114 strikeouts across 104 2/3 innings of work.

In 2018, Ramírez played for Fort Wayne, Lake Elsinore, the Double–A San Antonio Missions, and Triple–A El Paso Chihuahuas. Across 31 games (16 starts), he pitched to a cumulative 8–8 record and 4.28 ERA with 136 strikeouts across 115 2/3 innings of work. His 2019 season was split between El Paso and the Double–A Amarillo Sod Poodles, for whom he made a total of 27 appearances (21 starts) and struggled a 6.19 ERA with 116 strikeouts across 129 1/3 innings. Ramírez did not play in a game in 2020 due to the cancellation of the minor league season because of the COVID-19 pandemic. He elected free agency after the year on November 2, 2020.

=== Atlanta Braves ===
On November 16, 2020, Ramírez signed a minor league contract with the Atlanta Braves. In 27 appearances split between the High–A Rome Braves and Double–A Mississippi Braves, he posted a combined 7.34 ERA with 59 strikeouts and 3 saves in 38 innings. Ramírez elected free agency following the season on November 7, 2021.

=== New York Yankees ===
On November 19, 2021, Ramírez signed a minor league contract with the New York Yankees. He made 34 appearances out of the bullpen for the Double–A Somerset Patriots and Triple–A Scranton/Wilkes-Barre RailRiders, recording a cumulative 5–1 record and 3.43 ERA with 55 strikeouts across 44 2/3 innings pitched. Ramírez elected free agency following the season on November 10, 2022.

=== Acereros de Monclova ===
On April 25, 2023, Ramírez signed with the Acereros de Monclova of the Mexican League. Ramírez made 17 appearances (16 starts) for the club, registering a 5–6 record and 4.02 ERA with 77 strikeouts across 87 1/3 innings pitched.

=== Miami Marlins ===
On January 12, 2024, Ramírez signed a minor league contract with the Miami Marlins organization. He made 7 appearances for the Triple–A Jacksonville Jumbo Shrimp, posting a 3.86 ERA with 16 strikeouts and 3 saves in 11 2/3 innings. On April 28, Ramírez was selected to the 40-man roster and promoted to the major leagues for the first time. In 15 games for the Marlins, he struggled to a 6.97 ERA with 21 strikeouts over 20 2/3 innings pitched. Ramírez was designated for assignment by Miami on September 3.

=== Toronto Blue Jays ===
On September 5, 2024, Ramírez was claimed off waivers by the Toronto Blue Jays. In 5 games for the Triple–A Buffalo Bisons, he struggled to a 6.97 ERA with 21 strikeouts across 20 2/3 innings pitched. The Blue Jays designated Ramírez for assignment on November 4. He was released by Toronto on November 8.

=== Saitama Seibu Lions ===
On November 30, 2024, Ramírez signed with the Saitama Seibu Lions of Nippon Professional Baseball. On October 13, 2026, it was announced that the Lions would not bring Ramírez back for the 2027 season.
