= Kent Emanuel =

American baseball player (born 1992)

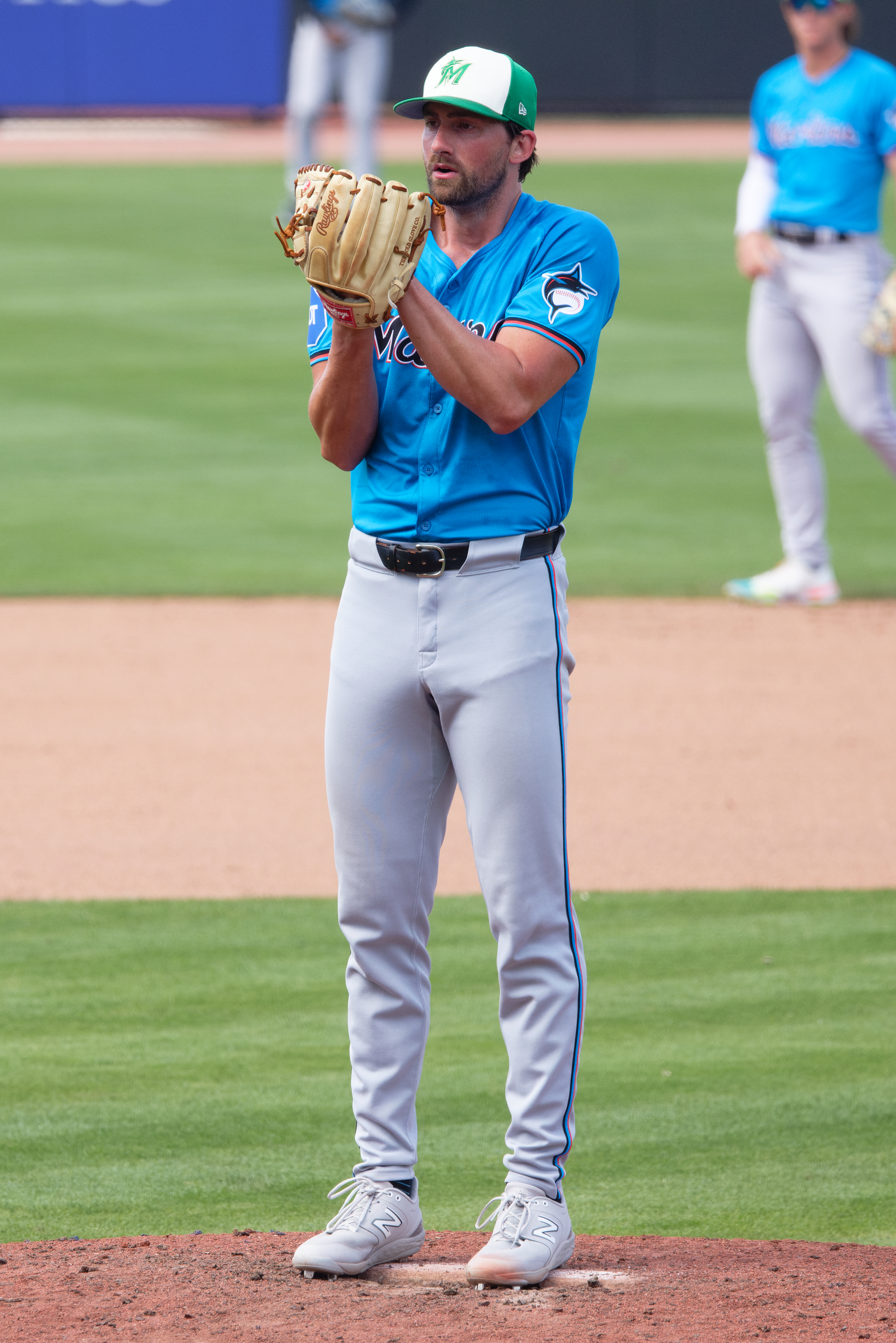
- Emanuel with the Marlins in 2024

Cincinnati Reds
- Pitcher
- Born: June 4, 1992 (age 34); Woodstock, Georgia, U.S.
- Bats: Left Throws: Left

MLB debut
- April 24, 2021, for the Houston Astros

MLB statistics (through August 17, 2026)
- Win–loss record: 1–1
- Earned run average: 4.46
- Strikeouts: 29
- Stats at Baseball Reference

Teams
- Houston Astros (2021); Miami Marlins (2024); Cincinnati Reds (2026)

Kent Jeffrey Emanuel (born June 4, 1992) is an American professional baseball pitcher in the Cincinnati Reds organization. He has previously played in MLB for the Houston Astros and Miami Marlins. Emanuel played college baseball for the North Carolina Tar Heels.

== Amateur career ==
Emanuel attended Woodstock High School in Woodstock, Georgia. He was drafted by the Pittsburgh Pirates in the 19th round of the 2010 MLB draft, but did not sign. Emanuel attended the University of North Carolina at Chapel Hill and played college baseball for the North Carolina Tar Heels. In 2011, he played collegiate summer baseball with the Falmouth Commodores of the Cape Cod Baseball League. In 2013, Emanuel was named the Atlantic Coast Conference Baseball Pitcher of the Year.

== Professional career ==
=== Houston Astros ===
The Houston Astros selected Emanuel in the third round, with the 74th overall selection, of the 2013 MLB draft. He pitched nine scoreless innings for the rookie-level Gulf Coast League Astros in 2013. He split the 2014 season between the Quad Cities River Bandits and the Lancaster JetHawks, going a combined 9–7 with a 4.21 ERA over 124 innings. He spent the 2015 season with the Corpus Christi Hooks, going 1–1 with a 3.68 ERA over 14 2/3 innings. He returned to Corpus Christi in 2016, going 6–4 with a 5.23 ERA over 82 2/3 innings. He split the 2017 season between Corpus Christi and the Fresno Grizzlies, going a combined 6–7 with a 5.72 ERA over 116 innings. He spent the 2018 season with Fresno, going 5–4 with a 5.59 ERA over 83 2/3 innings. Emanuel spent the 2019 season with the Round Rock Express of the Triple–A Pacific Coast League, going 8–2 with a 3.90 ERA over 101 2/3 innings.

The Astros added Emanuel to their 40-man roster on November 4, 2019. Emanuel did not play a minor league game in 2020 due to the cancellation of the minor league season caused by the COVID-19 pandemic. On August 6, 2020, he was suspended 80 games after testing positive for Dehydrochlormethyltestosterone. Emanuel responded by posting a ten-minute Instagram video professing his innocence and breaking down problems with the league's testing policies. He began wearing the uniform number 0 "to represent the number of games [he felt he] deserved to be suspended.”

On April 23, 2021, the Astros promoted Emanuel to the major leagues for the first time. In his MLB debut on April 24, he threw 8 2/3 innings in relief and picked up the win, becoming the first pitcher since Neil Allen in May 1988 to pitch more than eight innings in relief. He entered the game against the Los Angeles Angels at Minute Maid Park in relief of Jake Odorizzi who left the game due to tightness in his right forearm after retiring one batter on five pitches. On June 3, Emanuel underwent season-ending surgery to repair an injury to the ulnar collateral ligament in his left elbow. In 10 games for the Astros in 2021, he recorded a 2.55 ERA with 13 strikeouts.

=== Philadelphia Phillies ===
On November 19, 2021, the Philadelphia Phillies claimed Emanuel off of waivers. Emanuel was placed on the 60-day injured list to begin the 2022 season on March 20 with a left elbow impingement. He was activated on July 8, and optioned to the Triple-A Lehigh Valley IronPigs. In 13 starts split between Lehigh Valley, the Double–A Reading Fightin Phils, and the Single–A Clearwater Threshers, he accumulated a 2.64 ERA with 52 strikeouts in 58.0 innings pitched. His season ended prematurely after he was again placed on the injured list with a left shoulder strain on September 14. On November 9, Emanuel was removed from the 40-man roster and sent outright to Triple–A. He elected free agency the following day.

=== Pittsburgh Pirates ===
On February 10, 2023, Emanuel signed a minor league deal with the Pittsburgh Pirates. In 20 games (13 starts) for the Triple–A Indianapolis Indians (and one game for the High–A Bradenton Marauders), he posted a 7–5 record and 6.12 ERA with 78 strikeouts in 85 1/3 innings pitched. On August 10, Emanuel was released by the Pirates organization.

=== Miami Marlins ===
On February 8, 2024, Emanuel signed a minor league contract with the Miami Marlins. On April 1, Emanuel had his contract selected to the active roster. He made only one appearance for Miami, surrendering four runs in three innings against the Los Angeles Angels. On April 4, Emanuel was designated for assignment following the promotion of Matt Andriese. He cleared waivers and was sent outright to the Triple–A Jacksonville Jumbo Shrimp on April 7. On April 27, the Marlins selected Emanuel's contract and added him back to the active roster. He made one more appearance against the Washington Nationals, allowing four runs (three earned) in three innings, before he was designated for assignment the following day. Emanuel once more was outrighted to Jacksonville after clearing waivers on April 30. On June 15, Miami selected Emanuel's contract for a third time. He made two scoreless appearances before he was designated for assignment for a third time on June 19. Emanuel cleared waivers and returned to Jacksonville via an outright assignment on June 21. On June 23, his contract was purchased for the fourth time. After one scoreless appearance, he was designated for assignment following the promotion of Valente Bellozo on June 26. Emanuel returned to Jacksonville after clearing waivers on June 28. On August 9, the Marlins selected Emanuel's contract for a fifth time. After seven outings for the club, he was designated for assignment on September 3. Emanuel cleared waivers and was sent outright to Jacksonville on September 5. He elected free agency on October 1.

=== High Point Rockers ===
On April 7, 2025, Emanuel signed with the High Point Rockers of the Atlantic League of Professional Baseball. In 10 starts for the Rockets, Emanuel compiled a 6–1 record and 3.41 ERA with 48 strikeouts over 58 innings of work.

=== Diablos Rojos del México ===
On June 30, 2025, Emanuel's contract was purchased by the Diablos Rojos del México of the Mexican League. He made seven appearances (four starts) for México, compiling a 1-2 record and 5.47 ERA with 12 strikeouts across 24 2/3 innings pitched. With the team, Emanuel won the Serie del Rey. Emanuel was released by the Diablos on February 17, 2026.

=== High Point Rockers (second stint) ===
On April 16, 2026, Emanuel signed with the High Point Rockers of the Atlantic League of Professional Baseball. Emanuel started nine contests for the Rockers, compiling a 4–0 record and 2.30 ERA with 53 strikeouts across 47 innings pitched.

=== Cincinnati Reds ===
On August 7, 2026, Emanuel signed a minor league contract with the Cincinnati Reds. He made one start for the Triple–A Louisville Bats, allowing one run with eight strikeouts over six innings of work. On August 17, the Reds selected Emanuel's contract, adding him to their active roster. He started the first game of Cincinnati's doubleheader against the St. Louis Cardinals, allowing two runs on five hits with four strikeouts over five innings in the 2–1 loss. Emanuel was designated for assignment by the Reds following the game. He cleared waivers and was sent outright to Triple–A Louisville on August 20.
