= Anthony Veneziano =

American baseball player (born 1997)

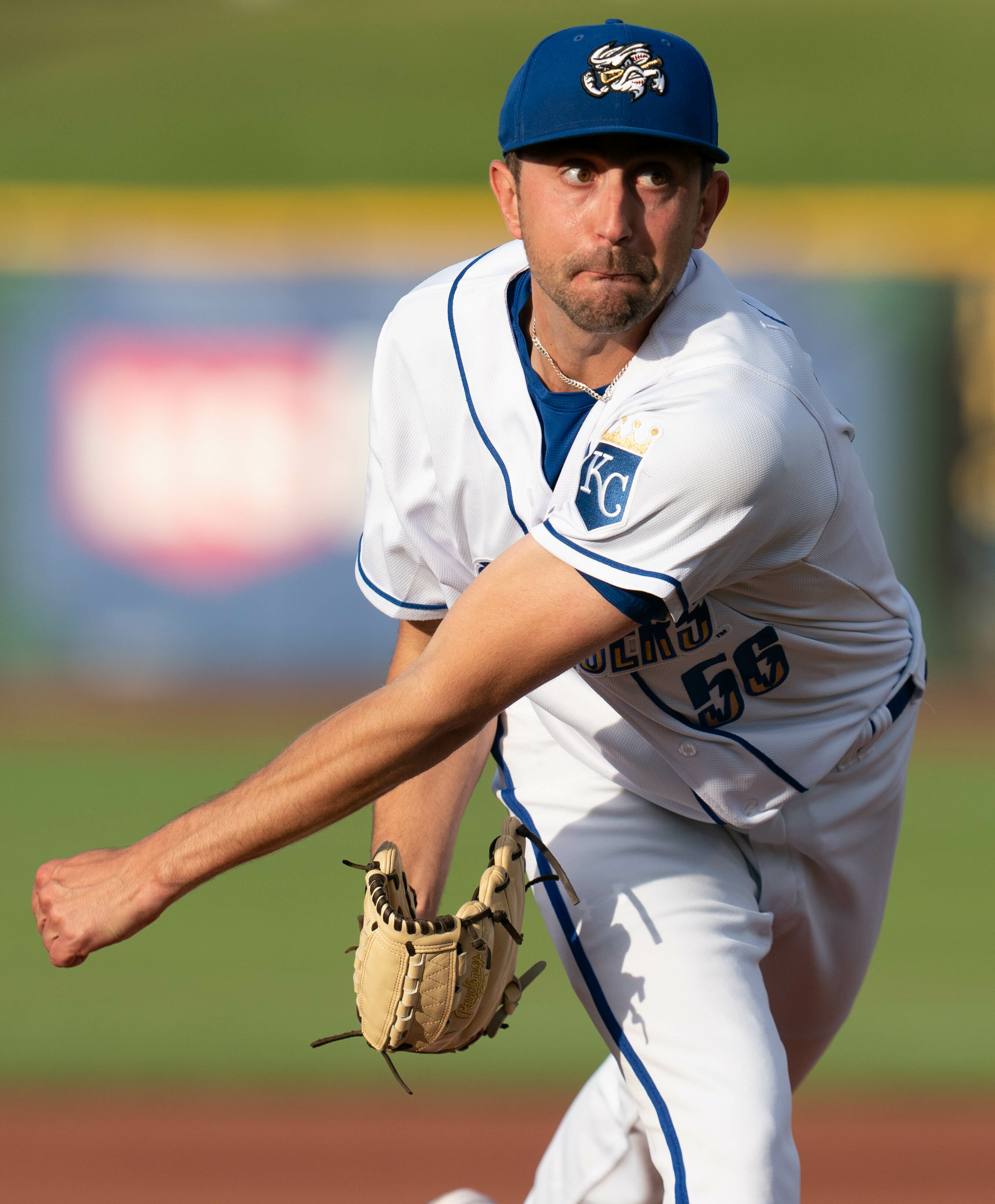
- Veneziano with the Omaha Storm Chasers in 2023

Texas Rangers
- Pitcher
- Born: September 1, 1997 (age 29); Hackettstown, New Jersey, U.S.
- Bats: Left Throws: Left

Professional debut
- MLB: September 26, 2023, for the Kansas City Royals
- KBO: March 31, 2026, for the SSG Landers

MLB statistics (through 2025 season)
- Win–loss record: 1–0
- Earned run average: 3.98
- Strikeouts: 40

KBO statistics (through 2026 season)
- Win–loss record: 2–5
- Earned run average: 6.10
- Strikeouts: 68
- Stats at Baseball Reference

Teams
- Kansas City Royals (2023–2024); Miami Marlins (2024–2025); St. Louis Cardinals (2025); SSG Landers (2026)

Anthony James Veneziano (born September 1, 1997) is an American professional baseball pitcher in the Texas Rangers organization. He has previously played in Major League Baseball (MLB) for the Kansas City Royals, Miami Marlins, and St. Louis Cardinals. He has also played in the KBO League for the SSG Landers.

== Early life ==
Veneziano attended Warren Hills Regional High School in Washington Township, Warren County, New Jersey and played college baseball at Coastal Carolina University. In 2018, he played collegiate summer baseball with the Cotuit Kettleers of the Cape Cod Baseball League.

== Career ==
=== Kansas City Royals ===
The Kansas City Royals drafted Veneziano in the 10th round, with the 289th overall selection, of the 2019 Major League Baseball draft. He made his professional debut with the Idaho Falls Chukars. He did not play in a game in 2020 due to the cancellation of the minor league season because of the COVID-19 pandemic.

Veneziano returned to action in 2021 with the Quad Cities River Bandits, making 22 starts and logging a 6–4 record and 3.75 ERA with 127 strikeouts across 93 2/3 innings pitched. Veneziano spent 2022 with the Double-A Northwest Arkansas Naturals, making 26 appearances (25 starts) and posting a 6–9 record and 5.72 ERA with 129 strikeouts.

Veneziano started the 2023 season with Northwest Arkansas before being promoted to the Triple-A Omaha Storm Chasers during the season. In 26 games (25 starts) split between the two clubs, he had a cumulative 10–5 record and 3.55 ERA with 127 strikeouts in 132 innings pitched. On September 19, Veneziano was selected to the 40-man roster and promoted to the major leagues for the first time. He made only two appearances in his rookie season, pitching 2 1/3 scoreless innings.

Veneziano was optioned to Triple-A to begin the 2024 season. In two games for the Royals, he compiled a 4.50 ERA with two strikeouts across two innings. Veneziano was designated for assignment by Kansas City on September 1.

=== Miami Marlins ===
On September 3, 2024, Veneziano was claimed off waivers by the Miami Marlins. The next day, the team added him to their active roster, replacing George Soriano. Veneziano made 10 appearances down the stretch for Miami, posting a 1–0 record and 3.18 ERA with 12 strikeouts across 11 1/3 innings pitched.

Veneziano made 24 appearances for Miami in 2025, recording a 4.71 ERA with 20 strikeouts over 21 innings of work. He was designated for assignment by the Marlins following the promotion of Jakob Marsee on August 1.

=== St. Louis Cardinals ===
On August 4, 2025, Veneziano was claimed off waivers by the St. Louis Cardinals. In two appearances for the Cardinals, he recorded a 4.50 ERA with five strikeouts over four innings of work. On November 6, Veneziano was removed from the 40-man roster. He rejected an outright assignment and elected free agency.

=== SSG Landers ===
On December 15, 2025, Veneziano signed a minor league contract with the Texas Rangers. He was released on January 10, 2026, in order to pursue an opportunity overseas. On January 19, Veneziano signed with the SSG Landers of the KBO League, filling the spot vacated by Drew VerHagen, who had failed a physical exam. In 16 starts, he posted a 2–5 record with a 6.10 ERA and 68 strikeouts across 79 2/3 innings pitched. On July 4, Veneziano was released by SSG.

=== Texas Rangers ===
On July 24, 2026, Veneziano signed a minor league contract with the Texas Rangers. In 10 games (6 starts) with Triple-A Round Rock Express he threw 37.1 innings going 2-1 with a 3.86 ERA with 32 strikeouts.

On November 3, 2026, Veneziano re-signed with the Rangers on a new minor league contract for the 2027 season.
