= Roddery Muñoz =

Dominican baseball player (born 2000)

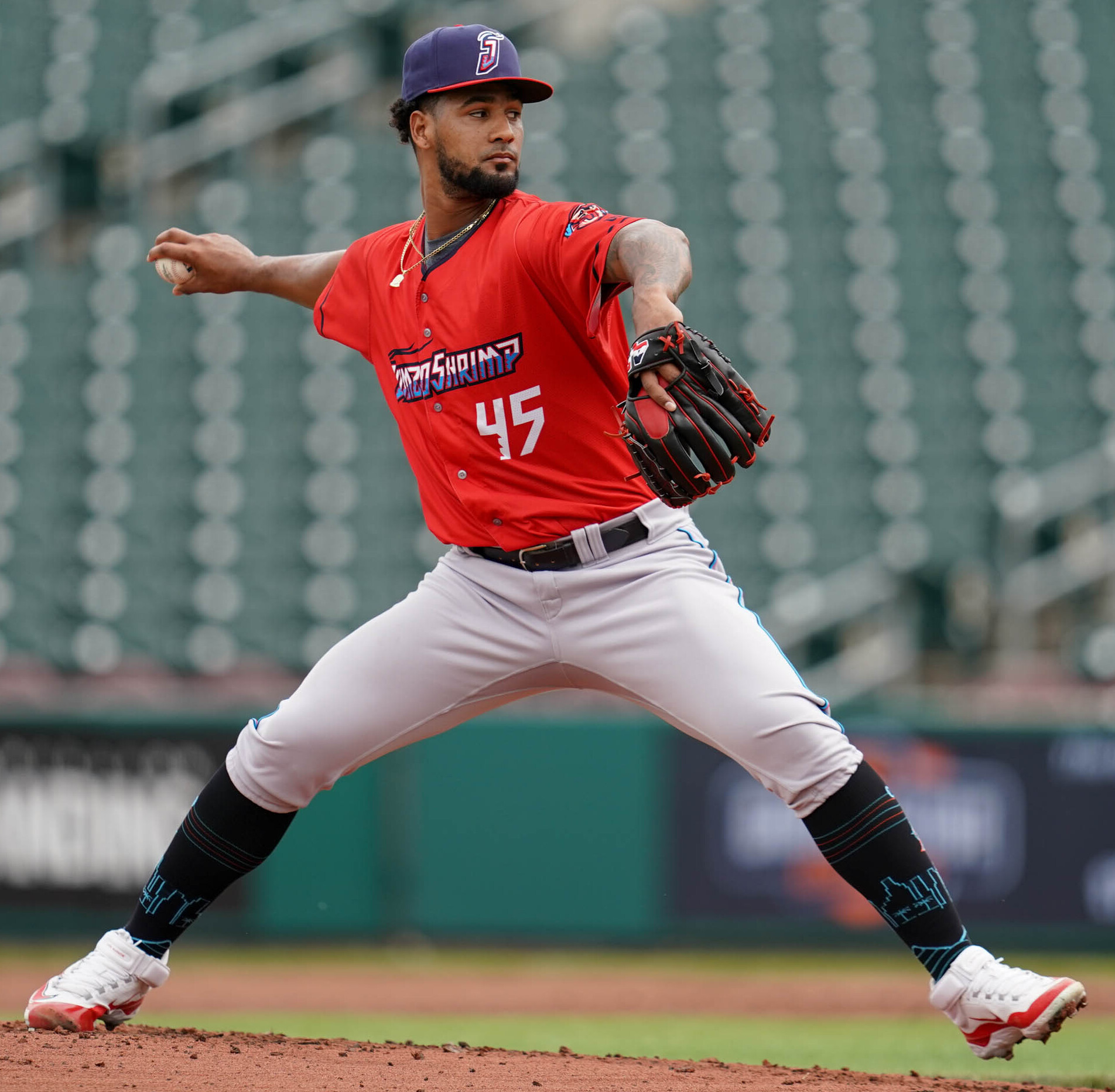
- Muñoz with the Jacksonville Jumbo Shrimp in 2024

Houston Astros
- Pitcher
- Born: April 14, 2000 (age 26); Santo Domingo, Dominican Republic
- Bats: Right Throws: Right

MLB debut
- April 20, 2024, for the Miami Marlins

MLB statistics (through 2026 season)
- Win–loss record: 2–7
- Earned run average: 7.10
- Strikeouts: 90
- Stats at Baseball Reference

Teams
- Miami Marlins (2024); St. Louis Cardinals (2025); Houston Astros (2026–present)

Roddery Muñoz (born April 14, 2000) is a Dominican professional baseball pitcher for the Houston Astros of Major League Baseball (MLB). He has previously played in MLB for the Miami Marlins and St. Louis Cardinals.

== Career ==
=== Atlanta Braves ===
On June 11, 2018, Muñoz signed with the Atlanta Braves as an international free agent. He made his professional debut that year with the Dominican Summer League Braves, logging a 6.88 ERA in 10 appearances. Muñoz returned to the club in 2019, making 14 starts and compiling a 3.77 ERA with 67 strikeouts across 62 innings pitched. He did not play in a game in 2020 due to the cancellation of the minor league season because of the COVID-19 pandemic.

Muñoz returned to action in 2021 with the Single–A Augusta GreenJackets. In 8 games (6 starts), he recorded a 6.67 ERA with 33 strikeouts across 29 2/3 innings of work. Muñoz split the 2022 campaign between the High–A Rome Braves and Double–A Mississippi Braves. In 22 starts between the two affiliates, he accumulated an 8–4 record and 4.66 ERA with 119 strikeouts across 100 1/3 innings.

On November 15, 2022, the Braves added Muñoz to their 40-man roster to protect him from the Rule 5 draft. Muñoz was optioned to the Triple-A Gwinnett Stripers to begin the 2023 season. In 14 games for Gwinnett (and 1 start for Double-A Mississippi), Muñoz registered a 4.94 ERA with 24 strikeouts in 27 1/3 innings of work. On June 6, 2023, Muñoz was promoted to the major leagues for the first time. He was optioned back to Gwinnett on June 8 after Michael Tonkin was activated from the injured list. In turn, he became a phantom ballplayer, having spent time on Atlanta's active roster without appearing in a game. On July 13, Muñoz was designated for assignment following the promotion of Lucas Luetge.

=== Washington Nationals ===
On July 17, 2023, Muñoz was claimed off waivers by the Washington Nationals. In 12 games (10 starts) for the Triple–A Rochester Red Wings, he struggled to a 6.98 ERA with 41 strikeouts across 38 2/3 innings of work.

=== Miami Marlins ===
On December 1, 2023, Muñoz was claimed off waivers by the Pittsburgh Pirates. On December 15, Muñoz was designated for assignment by Pittsburgh following the acquisition of Edward Olivares.

On December 20, 2023, Muñoz was traded to the Miami Marlins in exchange for cash considerations. He was optioned to the Triple–A Jacksonville Jumbo Shrimp to begin the 2024 season. On April 20, 2024, Muñoz was promoted to the major leagues for the first time. In 18 games (17 starts) for Miami, he compiled a 2–7 record and 6.53 ERA with 70 strikeouts across 82 2/3 innings pitched.

=== St. Louis Cardinals ===
On November 1, 2024, Muñoz was claimed off waivers by the St. Louis Cardinals. He was optioned to the Triple-A Memphis Redbirds to begin the 2025 season. Muñoz made nine appearances for the Cardinals, but struggled to an 8.18 ERA with 14 strikeouts over 11 innings of work.

=== Houston Astros ===
On November 6, 2025, Muñoz was claimed off waivers by the Cincinnati Reds. He was non-tendered by Cincinnati and became a free agent on November 21. Muñoz re-signed with the Reds on a minor league contract on December 2. On December 10, the Houston Astros selected Muñoz from the Reds in the Rule 5 draft. He made three appearances for Houston, but struggled to a 15.75 ERA with six strikeouts over four innings of work. On April 6, 2026, Muñoz was designated for assignment by the Astros. He cleared waivers and was sent outright to the Triple-A Sugar Land Space Cowboys on April 9. Muñoz received Pacific Coast League (PCL) All-Star honors following the season.

On November 2, 2026, the Astros selected Muñoz's contract, adding him to their 40–man roster.

== Personal life ==
Muñoz's identical twin brother, Rolddy Muñoz, is also a professional baseball player, and is currently a member of the Atlanta Braves.

== See also ==
- Rule 5 draft results
