= Griffin Conine =

American baseball player (born 1997)

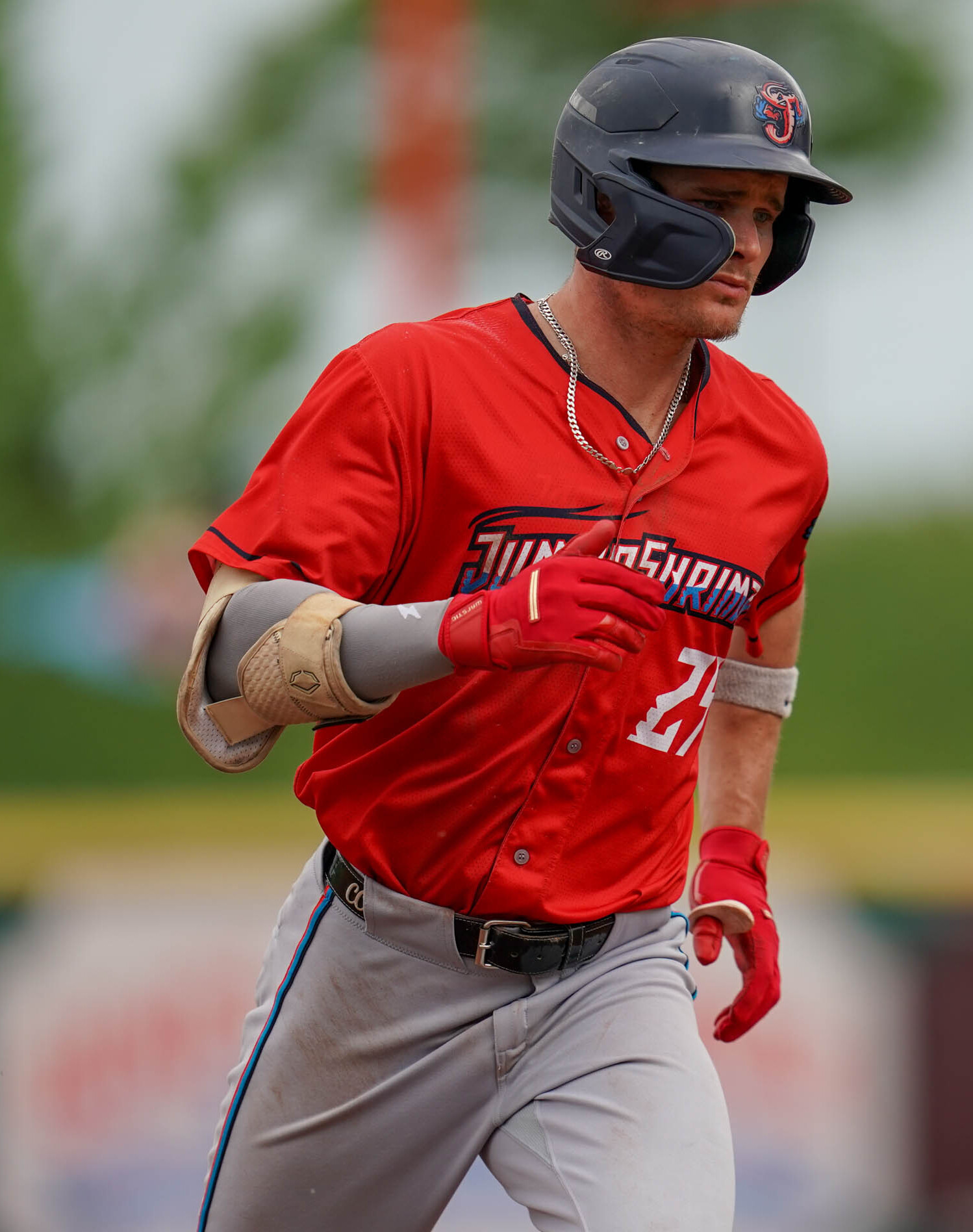
- Conine with the Jacksonville Jumbo Shrimp in May 2024

Miami Marlins – No. 18
- Outfielder
- Born: July 11, 1997 (age 29); Plantation, Florida, U.S.
- Bats: Left Throws: Right

MLB debut
- August 26, 2024, for the Miami Marlins

MLB statistics (through 2026 season)
- Batting average: .263
- Home runs: 24
- Runs batted in: 63
- Stats at Baseball Reference

Teams
- Miami Marlins (2024–present)

Griffin Riley Conine (born July 11, 1997) is an American professional baseball outfielder for the Miami Marlins of Major League Baseball (MLB). He is the son of former MLB outfielder Jeff Conine.

== Amateur career ==
Conine attended Pine Crest School in Fort Lauderdale, Florida. In his senior season, he recorded a .341 batting average with eight home runs and 27 runs batted in (RBI). He was selected in the 31st round of the 2015 Major League Baseball draft by the Miami Marlins, but did not sign, and attended Duke University in Durham, North Carolina. In his first season for the Blue Devils, Conine appeared in 35 games and hit .205 with six RBI. As a sophomore, he batted .298 with 13 home runs and 56 RBI. He became the first Blue Devil to have 50-plus RBI in a season since Nate Freiman (62) in 2009, and with 13 home runs, was the first Duke player with 10 or more in a season since Jake Lemmerman (10) in 2010. In his third and final season with Duke, Conine played in 63 games and hit .286 with 18 home runs and 52 RBI. In 2017, he played collegiate summer baseball with the Cotuit Kettleers of the Cape Cod Baseball League, and was named a league all-star and the league's Outstanding Pro Prospect.

== Professional career ==
=== Toronto Blue Jays ===
Conine was drafted by the Toronto Blue Jays in the second round, with the 52nd overall selection, of the 2018 Major League Baseball draft, and signed on June 20 for a $1.35 million signing bonus. He was assigned to the rookie-level Gulf Coast Blue Jays and appeared in two games before being promoted to the Low–A Vancouver Canadians. Conine finished the season with a .243 batting average, seven home runs, and 33 RBI in 57 games.

On November 19, 2018, Conine was suspended for 50 games after testing positive for a banned stimulant. He spent the 2019 season with the Single–A Lansing Lugnuts, going.283/.371/.576 with 22 home runs and 64 RBI over 80 games.

=== Miami Marlins ===
The Blue Jays traded Conine to the Marlins as a player to be named later in a August 31, 2020, trade for Jonathan Villar. Conine did not play in a game in 2020 due to the cancellation of the minor league season because of the COVID-19 pandemic. He returned to action in 2021 with the High–A Beloit Snappers and Double–A Pensacola Blue Wahoos. In 108 games split between the two affiliates and going .218/.330/.531 with career–highs in home runs (36) and RBI (84). Conine returned to Pensacola in 2022, playing in 118 games and going .215/.337/.435 with 24 home runs and 74 RBI. He split the 2023 season between Pensacola and the Triple–A Jacksonville Jumbo Shrimp, batting .247/.355/.462 with 20 home runs and 72 RBI.

Conine began the 2024 season with Jacksonville, playing in 112 games and going .268/.350/.475 with 19 home runs and 68 RBI. On August 26, 2024, he was selected to the 40-man roster and promoted to the major leagues for the first time. In 30 appearances for the Marlins during his rookie campaign, Conine batted .268/.326/.451 with three home runs and 12 RBI.

On April 19, 2025, it was announced that he had suffered a dislocated left shoulder. He was transferred to the 60-day injured list the following day. Conine underwent season-ending left shoulder surgery on April 29. In 20 appearances for the Marlins in 2025, he batted .352/.352/.438 with a home run and seven RBI. Despite the initial diagnosis, he was activated from the injured list on September 22, and returned to the active roster. On April 11, 2026, it was announced that it would take surgery to repair a torn left hamstring. He would miss 6-to-8 weeks as a result. He was activated from the injured list on June 21.
