= John McMillon =

American baseball player (born 1998)

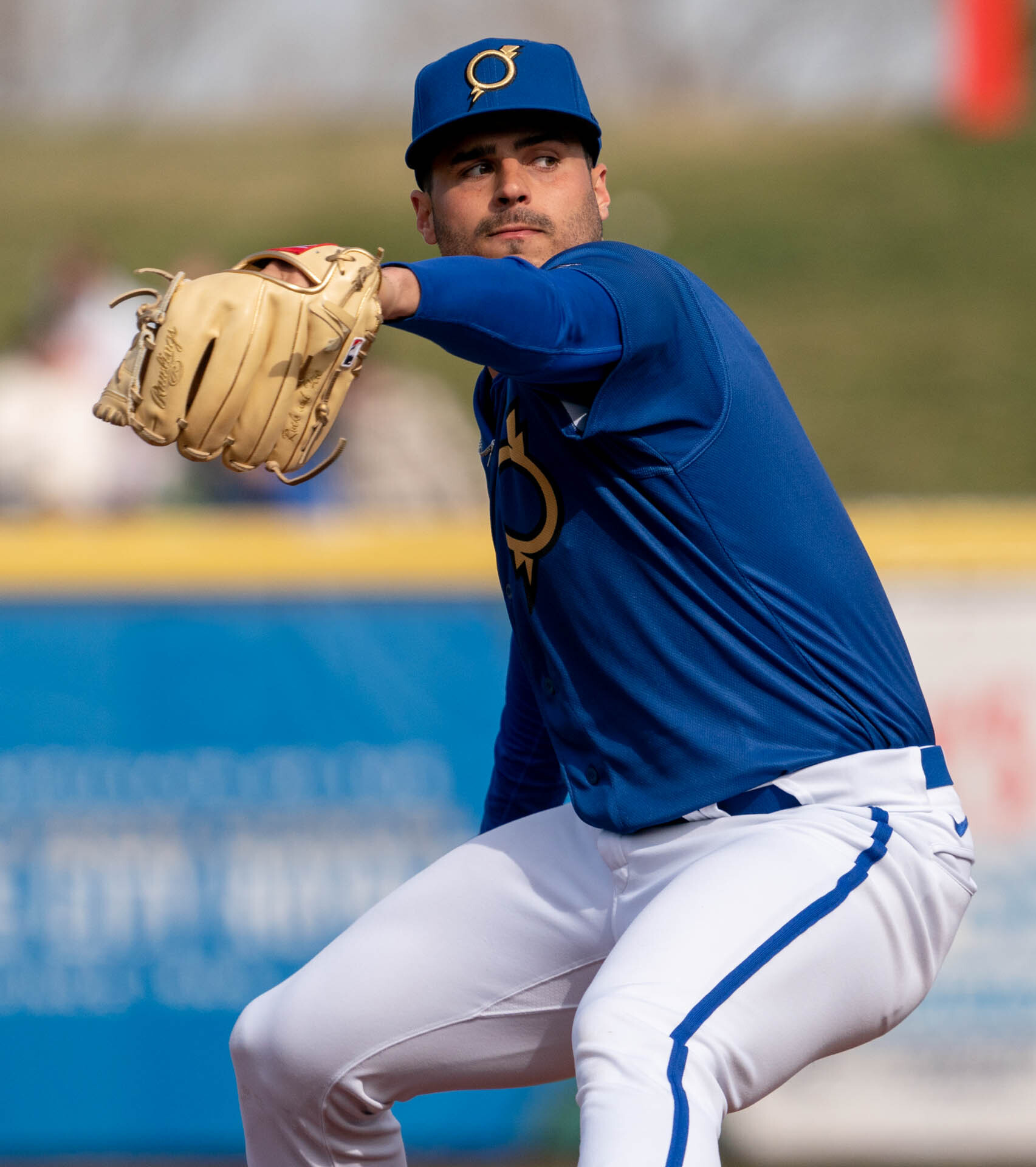
- McMillon with the Omaha Storm Chasers in 2024

Cleburne Railroaders – No. 85
- Pitcher
- Born: January 27, 1998 (age 28); Lufkin, Texas, U.S.
- Bats: Left Throws: Right

MLB debut
- August 17, 2023, for the Kansas City Royals

MLB statistics (through 2024 season)
- Win–loss record: 2–1
- Earned run average: 1.69
- Strikeouts: 21
- Stats at Baseball Reference

Teams
- Kansas City Royals (2023); Miami Marlins (2024)

John Mitchell McMillon (born January 27, 1998) is an American professional baseball pitcher for the Cleburne Railroaders of the American Association of Professional Baseball. He has previously played in Major League Baseball (MLB) for the Kansas City Royals and Miami Marlins.

== Amateur career ==
McMillon attended Jasper High School in Jasper, Texas. He was drafted by the Tampa Bay Rays in the 21st round of the 2016 Major League Baseball draft. He did not sign with Tampa and played college baseball at Texas Tech University. In 2018, he played collegiate summer baseball with the Chatham Anglers of the Cape Cod Baseball League. After his junior season, he was drafted by the Detroit Tigers in the 11th round of the 2019 MLB draft, but again did not sign and returned to Texas Tech for his senior season.

== Professional career ==
=== Kansas City Royals ===
After going undrafted in the 2020 MLB draft, McMillon signed with the Kansas City Royals on June 23, 2020. He made his professional debut in 2021 with Single-A Columbia, later being promoted to the High-A Quad Cities River Bandits. After posting a 2.70 ERA in 13 games, he was again promoted to the Double-A Northwest Arkansas Naturals, where he logged a stellar 0.87 ERA with 30 strikeouts and 5 saves in 20 2/3 innings pitched.

On August 16, 2023, McMillon was selected to the 40-man roster and promoted to the major leagues for the first time. On August 30, the Royals placed McMillon on the 15-day injured list with a strained right forearm.

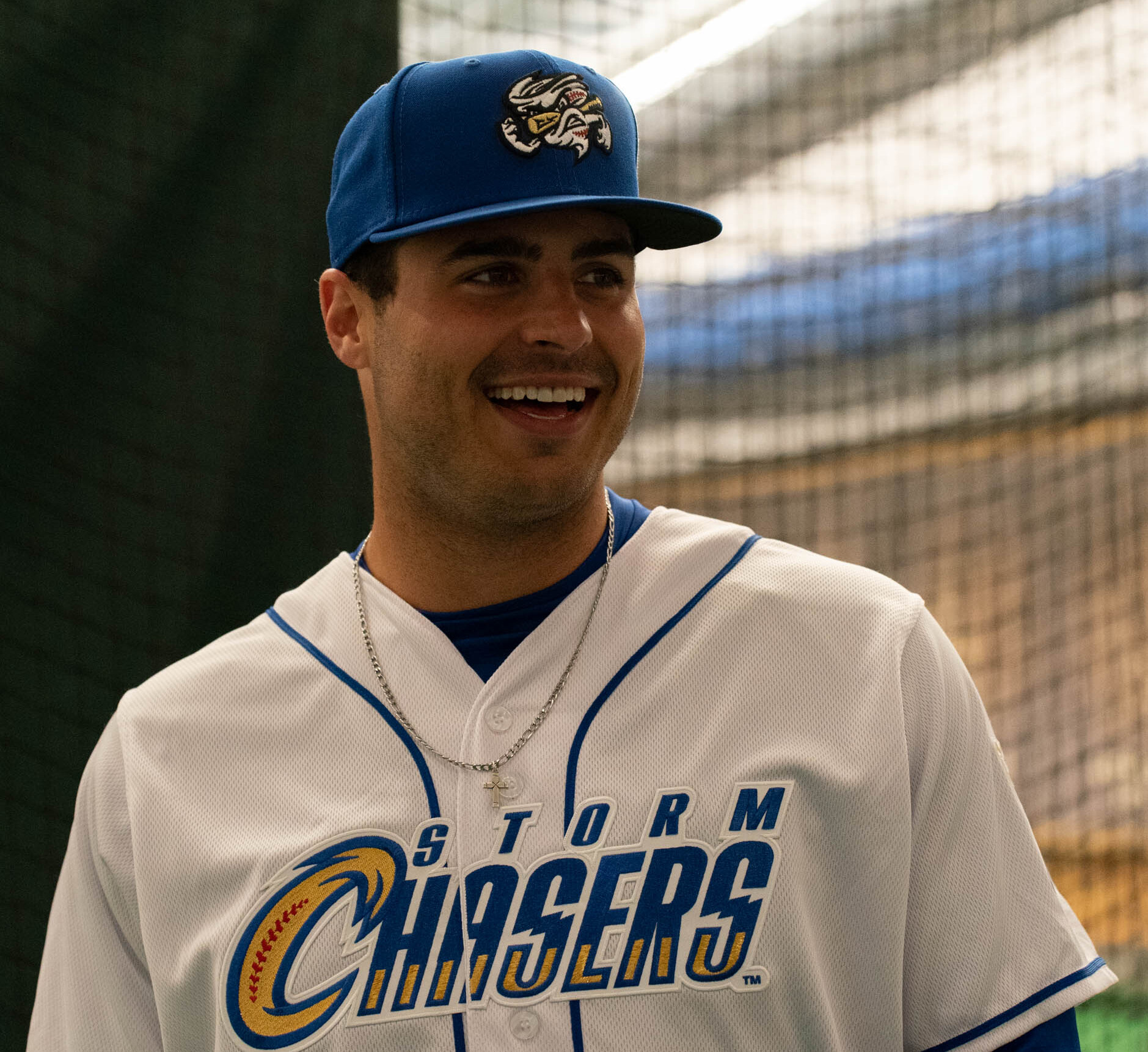
McMillon with the Omaha Storm Chasers in 2024

McMillon was optioned to the Triple-A Omaha Storm Chasers to begin the 2024 season. In 28 appearances for Omaha, he struggled to a 6.53 ERA with 35 strikeouts across 30 1/3 innings pitched. McMillon was designated for assignment by the Royals on July 30, 2024.

=== Miami Marlins ===
On August 2, 2024, McMillon was claimed off waivers by the Miami Marlins. In 10 appearances for the Marlins, he compiled a 2–1 record and 1.50 ERA with 13 strikeouts across 12 innings pitched. His season ended on September 12, when he was placed on the injured list with elbow tightness.

=== Philadelphia Phillies ===
On November 4, 2024, McMillon was claimed off waivers by the Philadelphia Phillies. On November 19, he was removed from the 40-man roster and sent outright to the Triple-A Lehigh Valley IronPigs. McMillon split the 2025 campaign between the Double-A Reading Fightin Phils and Triple-A Lehigh Valley IronPigs, accumulating an 0-3 record and 6.31 ERA with 52 strikeouts across 41 1/3 innings pitched.

McMillon returned to Lehigh Valley to begin the 2026 season, recording a 7.71 ERA with eight strikeouts in 9 1/3 innings pitched across 10 appearances. On June 1, 2026, McMillon was released by the Phillies organization.

=== Cleburne Railroaders ===
On August 29, 2026, McMillon signed with the Cleburne Railroaders of the American Association of Professional Baseball.
