= Anthony Maldonado (baseball) =

American baseball player (born 1998)

Piratas de Campeche – No. 63
- Pitcher
- Born: February 6, 1998 (age 28); Wellington, Florida, U.S.
- Bats: Right Throws: Right

MLB debut
- April 26, 2024, for the Miami Marlins

MLB statistics (through 2025 season)
- Win–loss record: 1–1
- Earned run average: 7.20
- Strikeouts: 18
- Stats at Baseball Reference

Teams
- Miami Marlins (2024); Athletics (2025)

Anthony Omar Maldonado (born February 6, 1998) is an American professional baseball pitcher for the Piratas de Campeche of the Mexican League. He has previously played in Major League Baseball (MLB) for the Miami Marlins and Athletics.

== Career ==
=== Miami Marlins ===
Maldonado played college baseball at Bethune–Cookman University. He was drafted by the Miami Marlins in the 11th round, with the 321st overall selection, of the 2019 Major League Baseball draft. He made his professional debut with the rookie–level Gulf Coast League Marlins, posting a 1.59 ERA across 10 games. Maldonado did not play in a game in 2020 due to the cancellation of the minor league season because of the COVID-19 pandemic.

He returned to action in 2021, and split the season between the rookie–level Florida Complex League Marlins, Single–A Jupiter Hammerheads, High–A Beloit Snappers, and Double–A Pensacola Blue Wahoos. In 21 games for the four affiliates, he accumulated a 4.30 ERA with 34 strikeouts across 29 1/3 innings pitched. Maldonado split the 2022 campaign between Pensacola and the Triple–A Jacksonville Jumbo Shrimp, compiling a 3.03 ERA with 86 strikeouts across 42 appearances out of the bullpen.

In 2023, Maldonado played for Jacksonville, also making three scoreless appearances for Jupiter. In 34 relief outings for the Jumbo Shrimp, he registered a 7–3 record and 1.76 ERA with 71 strikeouts and 9 saves. On November 14, 2023, the Marlins added Maldonado to their 40-man roster to protect him from the Rule 5 draft. He was optioned to the Triple–A Jacksonville Jumbo Shrimp to begin the 2024 season.

On April 26, 2024, Maldonado was promoted to the major leagues for the first time. He was named the starting pitcher for that night's game after Jesús Luzardo was scratched due to injury. In 16 games during his rookie campaign, Maldonado compiled a 1–1 record and 5.68 ERA with 11 strikeouts across 19 innings pitched.

=== Athletics ===
On November 4, 2024, Maldonado was claimed off waivers by the Athletics. He was designated for assignment by the Athletics on January 30, 2025. Maldonado cleared waivers and was sent outright to the Triple-A Las Vegas Aviators on February 5. In nine appearances for Las Vegas, he recorded an 0.73 ERA with 17 strikeouts and one save across 12 1/3 innings pitched. On May 16, the Athletics selected Maldonado's contract, adding him to their active roster. In six appearances for the team, he struggled to a 12.00 ERA with seven strikeouts over six innings of work. On November 5, Maldonado was removed from the 40-man roster and sent outright to Las Vegas; he subsequently rejected the assignment and elected free agency.

=== Houston Astros ===
On November 14, 2025, Maldonado signed a minor league contract with the Houston Astros. He was assigned to the Triple-A Sugar Land Space Cowboys to begin the regular season, where he posted a 1-0 record and 2.86 ERA with 20 strikeouts and two saves across 20 appearances. Maldonado was released by the Astros organization on June 5, 2026.

=== Piratas de Campeche ===
On July 1, 2026, Maldonado signed with the Piratas de Campeche of the Mexican League.

== International career ==
Maldonado played for the Puerto Rico national baseball team at the 2023 World Baseball Classic.
