= Dane Myers =

American baseball player (born 1996)

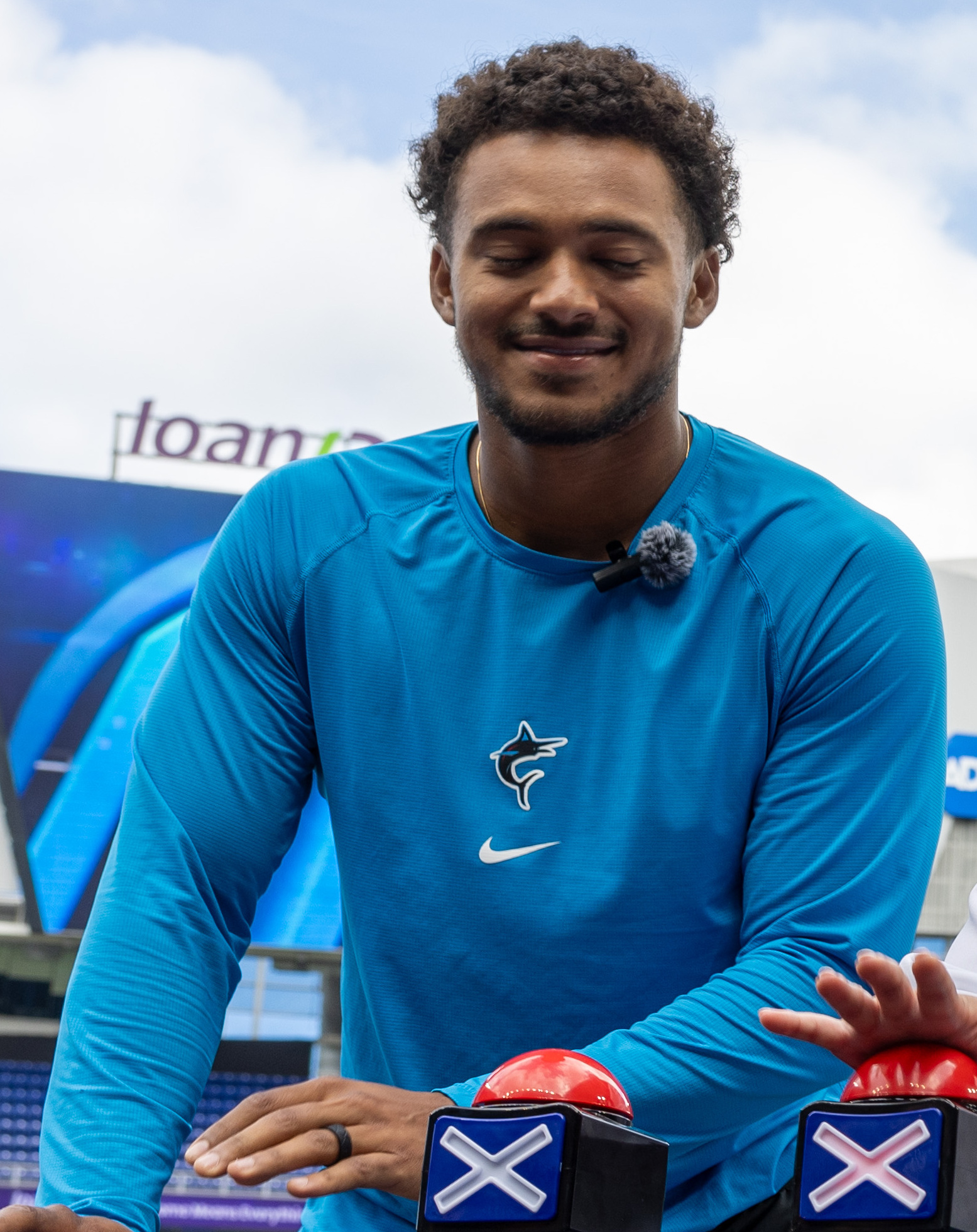
- Myers with the Miami Marlins in 2025

Cincinnati Reds – No. 17
- Third baseman / Outfielder
- Born: March 8, 1996 (age 30); Columbus, Texas, U.S.
- Bats: Right Throws: Right

MLB debut
- July 4, 2023, for the Miami Marlins

MLB statistics (through 2026 season)
- Batting average: .250
- Home runs: 18
- Runs batted in: 86
- Stats at Baseball Reference

Teams
- Miami Marlins (2023–2025); Cincinnati Reds (2026–present)

Dane Michael Myers (born March 8, 1996) is an American professional baseball infielder and outfielder for the Cincinnati Reds of Major League Baseball (MLB). He has previously played in MLB for the Miami Marlins.

== Career ==
=== Amateur career ===
Dane Michael Myers was born in Columbus, Texas, and attended James E. Taylor High School in Katy, Texas. He attended Rice University, where he was a two-way player for the Rice Owls baseball team. He earned 2nd Team All-Conference USA honors his junior year (2017) after leading the Owls in hits, home runs, total bases and stolen bases. He also held the second best ERA on the team.

=== Detroit Tigers ===
The Detroit Tigers selected Myers as a pitcher in the sixth round, with the 185th overall pick, of the 2017 Major League Baseball draft. He made his professional debut with the Connecticut Tigers of the short-season New York-Penn League. He logged a 2.33 ERA in 13 games (12 starts). In 2018, Myers started 14 games for the Single–A West Michigan Whitecaps, registering a 3.33 ERA with 61 strikeouts across 73.0 innings of work. He spent the 2019 season with the High–A Lakeland Flying Tigers, appearing in 15 games and struggling with a 6.54 ERA with 38 strikeouts across 52 1/3 innings pitched, before landing on the Injured List.

Upon returning from the IL, Myers was converted to a hitter, something he had not done since college. In 3 games at rookie-level Gulf Coast League, he went 3-5 with 4 walks and played third base.

Myers did not play in 2020 due to COVID-19 pandemic and the cancellation of the minor league baseball season. In 2021, he played in 45 games split between Lakeland, West Michigan, and the Double–A Erie SeaWolves, hitting .292/.371/.442 with 4 home runs, 24 RBI, and 5 stolen bases. In 2022, Myers split the year between Erie and the Triple–A Toledo Mud Hens. In 121 total games, he batted .267/.315/.489 with career–highs in home runs (25), RBI (77), and stolen bases (21). He became just the third Detroit Tigers minor leaguer to record a 20-20 season.

=== Miami Marlins ===
On December 7, 2022, Myers was selected by the Miami Marlins in the minor league phase of the Rule 5 draft. He split time between the Double–A Pensacola Blue Wahoos and Triple–A Jacksonville Jumbo Shrimp to begin the year. On July 3, 2023, Myers was selected to the 40-man roster and promoted to the major leagues for the first time. In 22 games for Miami in his rookie campaign, he batted .269/.286/.358 with one home run and nine RBI.

Myers was optioned to Triple–A Jacksonville to begin the 2024 season. He was recalled on April 28 to replace the injured Avisaíl García and took over as the right-handed hitting component of a platoon in right field with Jesús Sánchez. García was designated for assignment at the conclusion of his rehab assignment on June 4, and Myers kept his roster spot with the Marlins. In 40 games with Miami, he slashed .265/.337/.422 with two home runs, 14 RBI, and four stolen bases. On July 14, Myers suffered a fractured left ankle after kicking the clubhouse door. He was transferred to the 60–day injured list on August 25. Myers was activated on September 24.

Myers made 106 appearances for the Marlins during the 2025 campaign, batting .235/.291/.326 with six home runs, 31 RBI, and 18 stolen bases. On September 24, 2025, Myers was placed on the injured list due to a right knee laceration, an injury suffered when he collided with the outfield wall while attempting to make a catch; he was subsequently ruled out for the remainder of the season.

=== Cincinnati Reds ===
On December 27, 2025, the Marlins traded Myers to the Cincinnati Reds in exchange for Ethan O'Donnell.

== See also ==
- Rule 5 draft results
