= David Hensley =

American baseball player (born 1996)

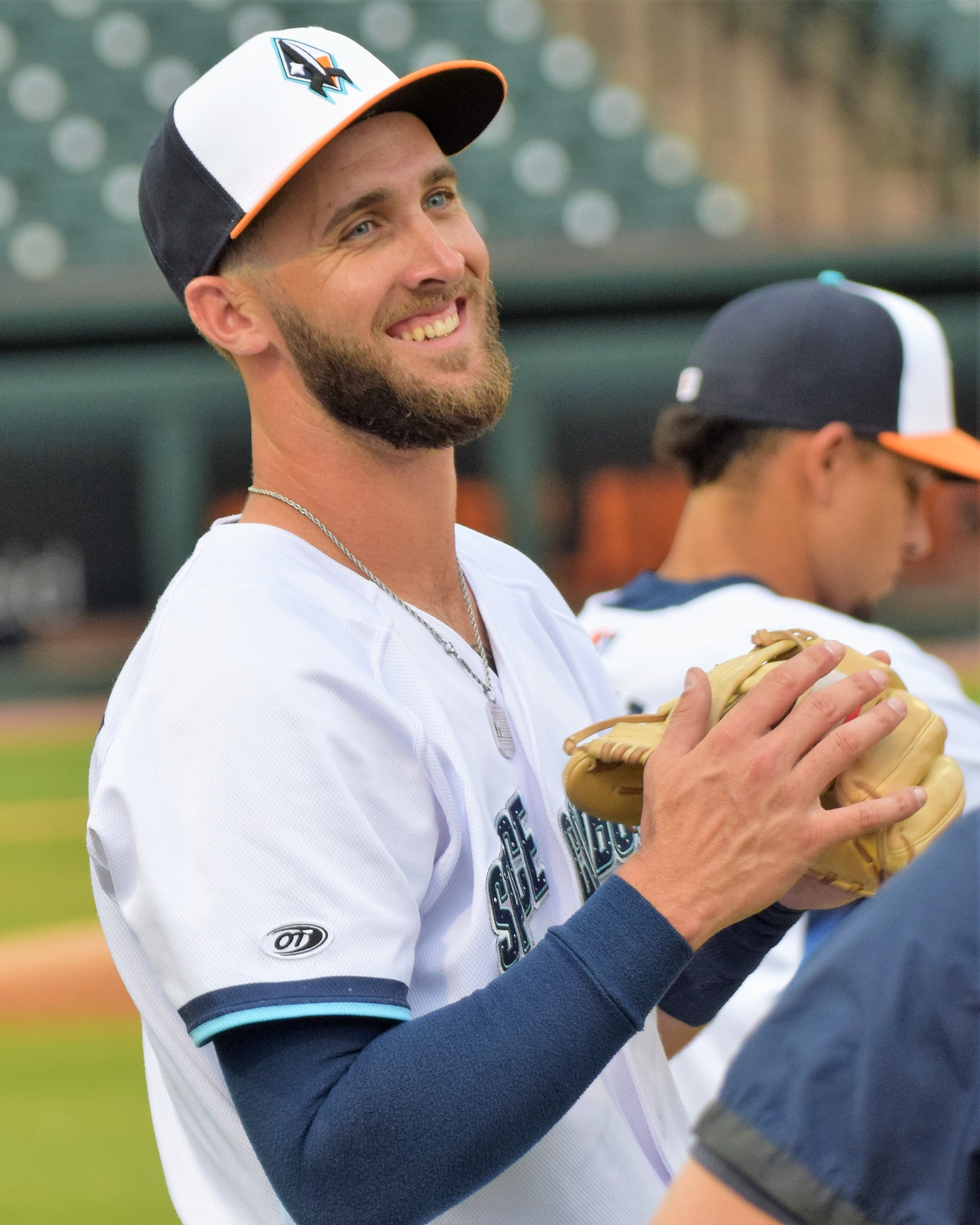
- Hensley with the Sugar Land Space Cowboys in 2022

Free agent
- Infielder
- Born: March 28, 1996 (age 30); San Diego, California, U.S.
- Bats: Right Throws: Right

MLB debut
- August 27, 2022, for the Houston Astros

MLB statistics (through 2024 season)
- Batting average: .191
- Home runs: 3
- Runs batted in: 11
- Stats at Baseball Reference

Teams
- Houston Astros (2022–2023); Miami Marlins (2024)

Career highlights and awards
- World Series champion (2022)

David James Hensley (born March 28, 1996) is an American professional baseball infielder who is a free agent. He has previously played in Major League Baseball (MLB) for the Houston Astros and Miami Marlins. Hensley played college baseball for the Aztecs, and was selected by the Astros in the 26th round of the 2018 MLB draft. He made his MLB debut in 2022 with the Astros.

== Amateur career ==
From San Diego, California, David Hensley attended Patrick Henry High School and San Diego State University (SDSU), where he played college baseball for the Aztecs. During his junior year, he led the Aztecs with a .357 batting average and played mostly right field. During his college career, he played every position except catcher.

Hensley played collegiate summer baseball for the Kalamazoo Growlers of the Northwoods League in 2016.

== Professional career ==
=== Houston Astros ===
==== Minor leagues ====
The Houston Astros drafted Hensley in the 26th round, with the 792nd overall selection, of the 2018 MLB draft. He made his professional debut that year with the High–A Quad Cities River Bandits. He spent the 2019 season with both Quad Cities and the Single–A Fayetteville Woodpeckers. Hensley did not play in a game in 2020 due to the cancellation of the minor league season because of the COVID-19 pandemic.

In 2021, Hensley played for the Double–A Corpus Christi Hooks. Hensley was named the Hooks' Player of the Year after appearing in a team-high 105 games. He achieved personal bests while simultaneously leading the club with 54 runs scored, a .293 batting average, 25 doubles, three triples, and 46 bases on balls. He also tallied nine home runs, 51 runs batted in (RBI), 11 stolen bases, and a .369 on-base percentage.

The Astros promoted Hensley to the Triple-A Sugar Land Space Cowboys to start the 2022 season. On June 21, 2022, Hensley hit a three-run walk-off home run to lead Sugar Land to a 3–1 victory over the Tacoma Rainiers. In Sugar Land, he batted .298/.420/.478 over 464 plate appearances and started at least 15 games at each of the four infield positions.

==== Major leagues ====
On August 20, 2022, the Astros selected Hensley's contract and promoted him to the major leagues. He made his major league debut on August 27, starting at shortstop and going 0-for-3 with a strikeout versus the Baltimore Orioles at Minute Maid Park. The following day, he doubled off Orioles starting pitcher Austin Voth in the third inning for his first major league hit. He collected his first three-hit game and reached base four times in a game for the first time in the major leagues versus the Texas Rangers on August 31. Hensley doubled home two runs on in fifth inning on September 4 versus Tucker Davidson of the Los Angeles Angels for his first two career RBI. Hensley hit his first major league home run on September 27 in the sixth inning at Minute Maid Park versus Ian Kennedy of the Arizona Diamondbacks. In 2022 he batted 10-for-27 with a home run and five RBI with the Astros. He appeared at second base, third base, shortstop, left field, and as a DH and pinch hitter.

Hensley made his postseason debut in Game 1 of the 2022 American League Division Series (ALDS), appearing as a pinch hitter in the ninth inning. He was hit by a Paul Sewald pitch, then replaced by Jake Meyers as pinch runner, who scored the lead run on a Yordan Alvarez three-run walk-off home run for an 8–7 final over the Seattle Mariners. It was the first walk-off home run in an MLB postseason contest with the home team down to their final out in the ninth inning and trailing by more than one run. The Astros advanced to the World Series and defeated the Philadelphia Phillies in six games to give Hensley his first career World Series title. In 2023, Hensley played in 30 games for the Astros, batting .119/.213/.167 with one home run and three RBI.

Hensley was optioned to Triple–A Sugar Land to begin the 2024 season. In 81 games for Sugar Land, he batted .234/.352/.376 with seven home runs, 35 RBI, and 17 stolen bases. Hensley was designated for assignment by the Astros on July 22, 2024.

=== Miami Marlins ===
On July 29, 2024, Hensley was claimed off waivers by the Miami Marlins. In 23 games for the Marlins, he slashed .212/.293/.288 with one home run, four RBI, and one stolen base. On November 1, Hensley was removed from the 40–man roster and sent outright to the minors. He elected free agency on November 4.

=== Detroit Tigers ===
On February 13, 2025, Hensley signed a minor league contract with the Detroit Tigers. In 15 appearances for the Triple-A Toledo Mud Hens, he went 4-for-47 (.085) with one home run, four RBI, and nine walks. Hensley was released by the Tigers organization on April 29.

=== Caliente de Durango ===
On May 2, 2025, Hensley signed with the Caliente de Durango of the Mexican League. In 55 appearances for Durango, Hensley slashed .304/.438/.571 with 13 home runs, 51 RBI, and 10 stolen bases.

=== Olmecas de Tabasco ===
On July 10, 2025, Hensley was traded to the Tigres de Quintana Roo of the Mexican League in exchange Wirfin Obispo and Randy Romero. However, he was then immediately traded to the Olmecas de Tabasco. In 20 appearances for Tabasco, he slashed .274/.345/.397 with one home run, six RBI, and four stolen bases.

=== Caliente de Durango (second stint) ===
On December 12, 2025, Hensley and Manuel Orduño were traded to the Caliente de Durango of the Mexican League in exchange for Diógenes Almengo and Randy Romero. Hensley made 10 appearances for Durango, batting .156/.229/.281 with one home run and two RBI.

=== Algodoneros de Unión Laguna ===
On May 2, 2026, Hensley was traded to the Algodoneros de Unión Laguna of the Mexican League. In three appearances for Laguna, he went 1-for-8 (.143) at the plate with two strikeouts. On May 11, Hensley was released by the Algodoneros.

=== Acereros de Monclova ===
On May 23, 2026, Hensley signed with the Acereros de Monclova of the Mexican League. He made 16 appearances for the Acereros, and batted .239/.340/.370 with one home run and five RBI. On June 20, Hensley was released by Monclova.

== See also ==
- List of people from San Diego
- List of San Diego State University people
