= Valente Bellozo =

Mexican baseball player (born 2000)

Free agent
- Pitcher
- Born: January 4, 2000 (age 26); Mexicali, Mexico
- Bats: Right Throws: Right

MLB debut
- June 26, 2024, for the Miami Marlins

MLB statistics (through 2026 season)
- Win–loss record: 4–9
- Earned run average: 4.43
- Strikeouts: 106
- Stats at Baseball Reference

Teams
- Miami Marlins (2024–2025); Colorado Rockies (2026)

Valente Bellozo (born January 4, 2000) is a Mexican professional baseball pitcher who is a free agent. He has previously played in Major League Baseball (MLB) for the Miami Marlins and Colorado Rockies.

== Career ==
=== Houston Astros ===
Bellozo signed with the Houston Astros as an international free agent on July 3, 2017. He made his professional debut in 2018 with the Dominican Summer League Astros, posting a 1.74 ERA with 42 strikeouts over 14 appearances. Bellozo split the 2019 campaign between the Low–A Tri-City ValleyCats and Single–A Quad Cities River Bandits. In 14 appearances between the two affiliates, he accumulated a 6–1 record and 1.70 ERA with 69 strikeouts across 58 1/3 innings pitched.

Bellozo did not play in a game in 2020 due to the cancellation of the minor league season because of the COVID-19 pandemic. He missed the entirety of the 2021 campaign as well, due to an undisclosed injury. Bellozo returned to action in 2022, making 10 appearances (5 starts) for the Single–A Fayetteville Woodpeckers and recording a 1.73 ERA with 43 strikeouts.

Bellozo split the 2023 season between the High–A Asheville Tourists and Double–A Corpus Christi Hooks. In 26 total games (16 starts), he compiled a cumulative 5.55 ERA with 106 strikeouts and 4 saves across 110 1/3 innings of work.

=== Miami Marlins ===
On April 6, 2024, the Astros traded him to the Miami Marlins for Jacob Amaya. He split time between the Double–A Pensacola Blue Wahoos and Triple–A Jacksonville Jumbo Shrimp prior to his promotion. On June 26, Bellozo was selected to the 40-man roster and promoted to the major leagues for the first time. In his MLB debut that day against the Kansas City Royals, Bellozo tossed five scoreless innings, allowing two hits and striking out two. In 13 starts for Miami during his rookie campaign, Bellozo logged a 3-4 record and 3.67 ERA with 44 strikeouts across 68 2/3 innings pitched.

Bellozo was optioned to Triple-A Jacksonville to begin the 2025 season. He made 32 appearances (six starts) for Miami, posting a 1-4 record and 4.65 ERA with 54 strikeouts across 81 1/3 innings pitched. On November 5, 2025, Bellozo was removed from the 40-man roster and sent outright to Jacksonville. He elected free agency the following day.

=== Colorado Rockies ===
On February 2, 2026, Bellozo signed a minor league contract with the Colorado Rockies. On March 26, the Rockies selected Bellozo's contract and subsequently optioned him to the Triple-A Albuquerque Isotopes. He made three appearances for Colorado, but struggled to an 0–1 record and 7.59 ERA with eight strikeouts across 10 2/3 innings pitched. On June 13, Bellozo was removed from the 40–man roster and sent outright to Triple-A Albuquerque. He elected free agency on November 2.

== Personal life ==
Bellozo's sports psychologist is former professional infielder Freddy Sandoval.
