= Basabe (surname) =

Basabe (bah-sah'vay) is a Spanish origin surname. Notable people with the surname include:

- Carlos Basabe (1924–1994), Spanish footballer
- Fabián Basabe (born 1978), American businessman and politician
- Luis Alejandro Basabe (born 1996) is a Venezuelan baseball player
- Luis Alexander Basabe (born 1996), Venezuelan baseball player
- Melsahn Basabe (born 1992), Puerto Rican basketball player
- Maria del Pilar Careaga Basabe, known as Pilar Careaga (1908–1993), Spanish politician and industrial engineer
