= Luis Matos =

Luis Matos may refer to:

- Luis Matos (baseball, born 1978), Puerto Rican baseball outfielder
- Luis Matos (baseball, born 2002), Venezuelan baseball outfielder
