= Heriberto Hernández =

Dominican baseball player (born 1999)

Miami Marlins – No. 13
- Outfielder
- Born: December 16, 1999 (age 26); Bonao, Dominican Republic
- Bats: Right Throws: Right

MLB debut
- May 30, 2025, for the Miami Marlins

MLB statistics (through 2026 season)
- Batting average: .241
- Home runs: 35
- Runs batted in: 112
- Stats at Baseball Reference

Teams
- Miami Marlins (2025–present)

Heriberto Jose Hernández (born December 16, 1999) is a Dominican professional baseball outfielder for the Miami Marlins of Major League Baseball (MLB). He made his MLB debut in 2025.

== Career ==
=== Texas Rangers ===
On December 13, 2017, Hernández signed with the Texas Rangers as an international free agent. He made his professional debut in 2018 with the Dominican Summer League Rangers, hitting .292 with 12 home runs and 49 RBI across 60 appearances.

Hernández split the 2019 season between the rookie-level Arizona League Rangers and Low-A Spokane Indians, batting a combined .345/.436/.635 with 11 home runs, 49 RBI, and six stolen bases over 53 total games. He did not play in a game in 2020 due to the cancellation of the minor league season because of the COVID-19 pandemic.

=== Tampa Bay Rays ===
On December 10, 2020, the Rangers traded Hernández, Osleivis Basabe, and Alexander Ovalles to the Tampa Bay Rays in exchange for Nathaniel Lowe, Jake Guenther, and Carl Chester. He spent the 2021 season with the Single-A Charleston RiverDogs, playing in 73 games and hitting .252/.381/.453 with 12 home runs, 44 RBI, and seven stolen bases. He was named the Low-A East Player of the Week for July 26-August 1.

Hernández made 119 appearances for the High-A Bowling Green Hot Rods in 2022, slashing .255/.368/.499 with career-highs in home runs (24) and RBI (89), as well as six stolen bases. He spent the 2023 season with the Double-A Montgomery Biscuits, making 118 appearances and hitting .249/.376/.411 with 13 home runs, 60 RBI, and seven stolen bases.

Hernández split the 2024 season between Montgomery and the Triple-A Durham Bulls, batting a cumulative .234/.343/.496 with 23 home runs, 60 RBI, and five stolen bases in 104 total games. He elected free agency following the season on November 4, 2024.

=== Miami Marlins ===
On November 13, 2024, Hernández signed a minor league contract with the Miami Marlins. He began the 2025 season with the Triple-A Jacksonville Jumbo Shrimp, hitting .220/.319/.454 with nine home runs, 21 RBI, and six stolen bases in 41 games. On May 30, 2025, Hernández was selected to the 40-man roster and promoted to the major leagues for the first time. In a June 4 game against the Colorado Rockies, Hernández recorded his first two career hits and first career run batted in. On June 11, he hit his first career home run off of Bailey Falter of the Pittsburgh Pirates. Hernández made 87 appearances for Miami, slashing .266/.347/.438 with 10 home runs and 45 RBI.

On May 24, 2026, Hernández hit a walk–off grand slam off of Devin Williams of the New York Mets.
