= Chris Sale =

American baseball player (born 1989)

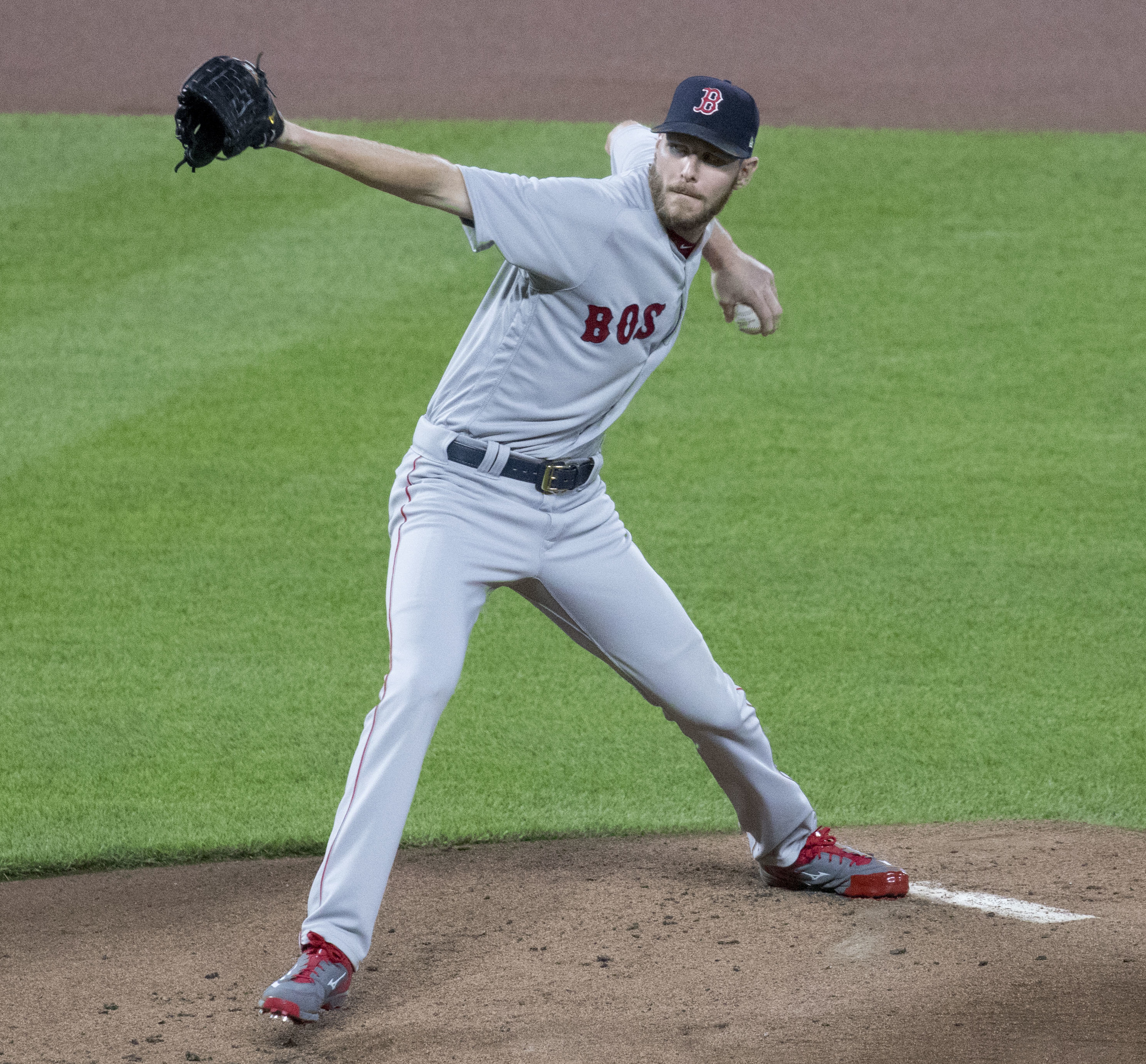
- Sale with the Boston Red Sox in 2017

Atlanta Braves – No. 51
- Pitcher
- Born: March 30, 1989 (age 37); Lakeland, Florida, U.S.
- Bats: Left Throws: Left

MLB debut
- August 6, 2010, for the Chicago White Sox

MLB statistics (through 2026 season)
- Win–loss record: 159–97
- Earned run average: 2.95
- Strikeouts: 2,779
- Stats at Baseball Reference

Teams
- Chicago White Sox (2010–2016); Boston Red Sox (2017–2019, 2021–2023); Atlanta Braves (2024–present)

Career highlights and awards
- 10× All-Star (2012–2018, 2024–2026); World Series champion (2018); NL Cy Young Award (2024); Triple Crown (2024); 2x All-MLB First Team (2024, 2026); Gold Glove Award (2024); NL Comeback Player of the Year (2024); NL wins leader (2024); NL ERA leader (2024); 3× strikeout leader (2015, 2017, 2024)

Christopher Allen Sale (born March 30, 1989) is an American professional baseball pitcher for the Atlanta Braves of Major League Baseball (MLB). He has previously played in MLB for the Chicago White Sox and Boston Red Sox. He throws left-handed and is 6 feet 6 inches (1.98 m) tall.

A native of Lakeland, Florida, located within the Tampa Bay area, Sale played college baseball for Florida Gulf Coast University. The Chicago White Sox selected him 13th overall in the 2010 MLB draft and he made his MLB debut on August 6, 2010. He was traded to the Boston Red Sox prior to the 2017 season and was a key member of their pitching rotation that helped the team win the 2018 World Series.

Sale was an MLB All-Star for seven consecutive seasons from 2012 to 2018 and led the American League (AL) in strikeouts in 2015 and 2017. After reaching 300 strikeouts in a single season for the first time in 2017, he was selected as the AL Sporting News Starting Pitcher of the Year. Sale was the quickest to reach 2,000 career strikeouts in the fewest innings pitched (1,626). After a string of injuries derailed his final few years in Boston, Sale was traded to the Braves following the 2023 season and was later named to his eighth All-Star Game in 2024, as well as winning his first Cy Young Award, Triple Crown and Gold Glove Award. Sale was again named an All-Star in 2025 and 2026.

== Early life ==
Christopher Allen Sale was born on March 30, 1989, in Lakeland, Florida. He attended and graduated from Lakeland Senior High School, where he played basketball and baseball. After his senior year for the Dreadnaughts, Sale was drafted in the 21st round of the 2007 Major League Baseball draft by the Colorado Rockies, but chose not to sign and instead attended Florida Gulf Coast University.

== College career ==
Sale played college baseball for the Florida Gulf Coast Eagles baseball team under head coach Dave Tollett. During the 2010 season at FGCU, Sale posted an 11–0 win–loss record and a 2.01 ERA over 17 games. Sale pitched 103 innings while recording 146 strikeouts and 14 walks. He led the NCAA in strikeouts at the end of the regular season. Sale was named the Atlantic Sun Conference Pitcher of the Year and the Collegiate Baseball Player of the Year. He is one of four Eagles to play in the major leagues, along with pitchers Jacob Barnes, Richard Bleier, and Casey Coleman.

Like many top college players, Sale spent the NCAA offseason pitching in collegiate baseball summer leagues. In 2008, he was an All-Star for the La Crosse Loggers of the Northwoods League, and it was during his time in Wisconsin that coaches suggested he adopt his now distinctive sidearm arm angle. In the summer of 2009, Sale pitched for the Yarmouth-Dennis Red Sox of the Cape Cod Baseball League, where he posted a record of 4–2 with an earned run average of 1.47 and 57 strikeouts, was named MVP of the league's All-Star Game at Fenway Park, and received the league's Outstanding Pitcher award.

== Professional career ==
=== Draft and minors ===
Sale was drafted by the White Sox with the 13th overall selection in the first round of the 2010 MLB draft. Once Sale signed with the White Sox in 2010, he was assigned to the White Sox' Class A affiliate Winston-Salem Dash. Sale pitched in four games with a 2.25 ERA in four innings, while giving up three hits and one earned run while walking two and striking out four during his tenure with the Dash. Sale was then promoted to the White Sox' Triple-A affiliate Charlotte Knights. While there, Sale pitched in seven games earning a 2.84 ERA in 6 1/3 innings, while giving up three hits and two earned runs while walking four and striking out 15.

=== Chicago White Sox (2010–2016) ===
==== 2010 ====
Sale was called up to the majors for the first time on August 4, 2010, and made his MLB debut on August 6, against the Baltimore Orioles in the eighth inning. He was the first 2010 draft pick to be promoted to the majors and got his first major league save on September 1, 2010, against the Cleveland Indians. In 21 appearances in his rookie year, Sale went 2–1 with a 1.93 ERA, 32 strikeouts, and 4 saves.

==== 2011 ====
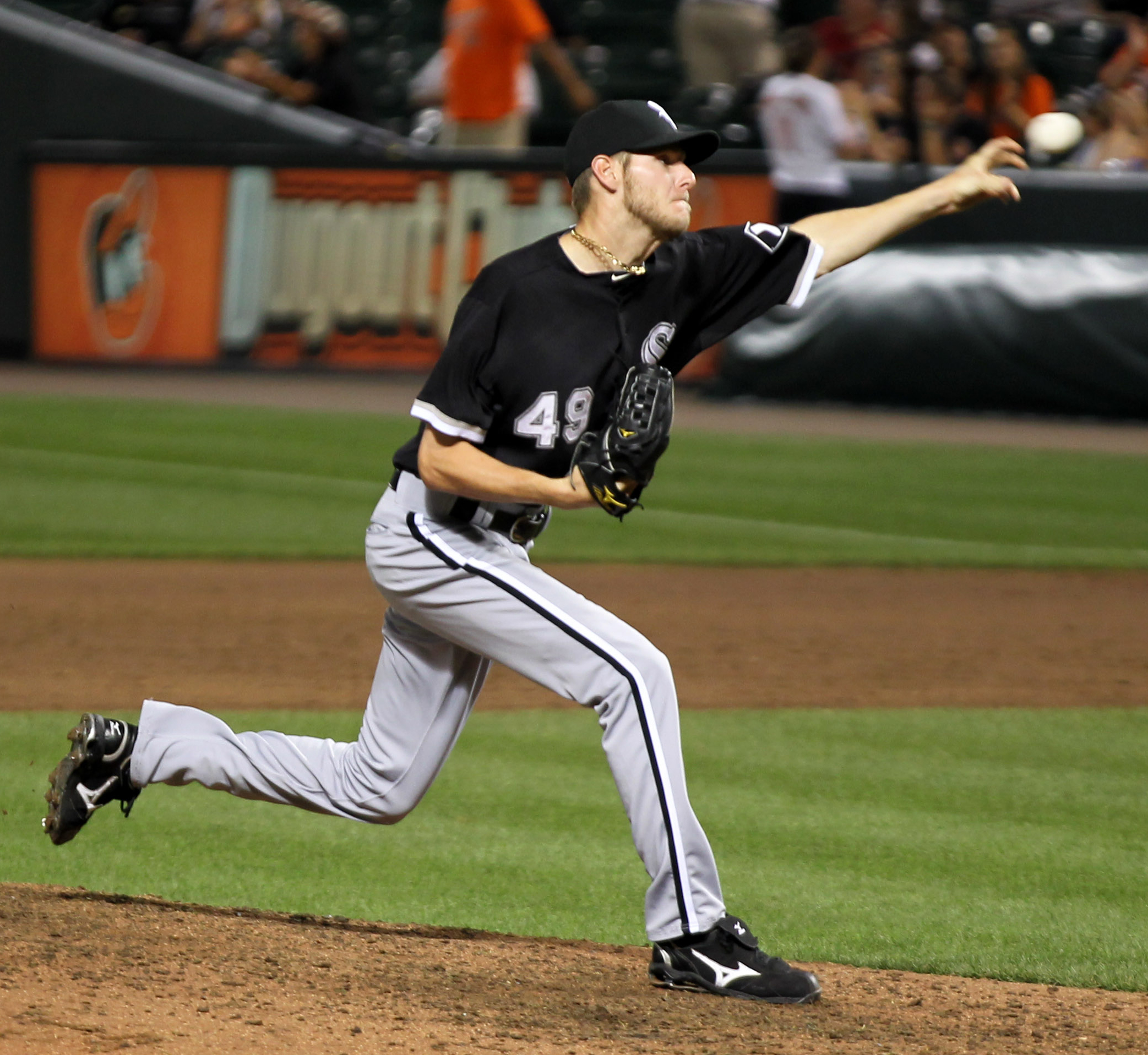
Sale with the White Sox in 2011

During the 2011 season, Sale made 58 appearances out of the bullpen with a 2–2 record, a 2.79 ERA, 8 saves, and 79 strikeouts.

==== 2012 ====
Sale made the transition to a starting pitcher for the 2012 season. On May 28, Sale struck out a career-high 15 batters in 7 1/3 innings during a 2–1 victory over the Tampa Bay Rays. Sale's 15 strikeouts are tied for second most in franchise history with Eddie Cicotte, Ed Walsh, and Jim Scott. Jack Harshman and Lance Lynn hold the White Sox team record with 16 strikeouts in a game. Sale was named the American League (AL) Pitcher of the Month for May with a record of 4–1, an ERA of 1.71, 35 strikeouts and a .181 opponents' average over six games.

Sale was chosen by AL All-Star manager Ron Washington to pitch in the All-Star Game, Sale's first All-Star appearance.

During the 2012 season, Sale compiled a 17–8 record, a 3.05 ERA, and 192 strikeouts in 192 innings pitched. He finished sixth in voting for the AL Cy Young Award.

==== 2013 ====
On March 7, 2013, Sale and the White Sox agreed on a five-year, $32 million contract with two team option years.

On May 12, Sale threw a one-hit shutout during a 3–0 White Sox victory over the Los Angeles Angels of Anaheim. Sale took a perfect game into the seventh inning. With one out in the top of the seventh inning, Mike Trout singled up the middle for the only hit of the game. Sale finished the game with 7 strikeouts and no walks, allowing Trout as the only base runner. Sale began the season with a 6–8 record and a 2.85 ERA. He was named an All-Star for the second consecutive season. Sale pitched in the second and third innings, allowing no hits, no runs, no walks, and striking out two National League (NL) hitters. He was named the winning pitcher for the AL, which won the game 3–0.

In 30 starts of the 2013 season, Sale had an AL-leading 4 complete games, an 11–14 record, 226 strikeouts, and a 3.07 ERA in 214.1 innings pitched. He received one of the lowest run supports in the AL. Sale finished in fifth place in Cy Young votes for 2013.

==== 2014 ====
On April 21, Sale was placed on the 15-day disabled list after sustaining a flexor strain in his left (pitching) elbow. During his first start off the disabled list against the New York Yankees on May 22, Sale retired the first 17 batters in a row before allowing a single by Zoilo Almonte. He struck out 10 in 6 innings pitched as the White Sox won the game 3–2. During a game against the Angels on June 7, 2014, Sale had a 5–0 lead but surrendered 5 runs all in the 7th inning that featured a grand slam by Mike Trout. Sale continued his dominance on the mound, winning eight of his first nine decisions and carrying an 8–1 record and 2.08 ERA into the All-Star break.

After not initially making the All-Star roster, Sale was voted into the game by fans (alongside Cubs first baseman Anthony Rizzo) as part of the "Final Vote." Sale joined teammates Jose Abreu and Alexei Ramírez in the All-Star Game in Minneapolis.

Sale finished the season with a 12–4 record, 208 strikeouts in 174 innings pitched, and a 2.17 ERA, second-best in the American League. He finished third in voting for the AL Cy Young award, behind winner Corey Kluber and Félix Hernández.

==== 2015 ====
Sale started the 2015 year on the disabled list due to a foot injury. He returned on April 12, pitching 6 innings with 8 strikeouts in a 6–2 victory over the Minnesota Twins. During a game against the Kansas City Royals on April 23, Sale was warned by home plate umpire Sam Holbrook after hitting Mike Moustakas with a pitch. Later, Sale was involved in a bench-clearing brawl after his teammate Adam Eaton grounded out to Yordano Ventura. Sale was one of five players to be ejected for his role in the brawl as the White Sox lost to the Royals 2–3 in 13 innings. On April 25, Sale was suspended for 5 games.

In a June 8 win over the Houston Astros, Sale struck out 14 batters. On June 19, Sale had his fifth consecutive game with 12 or more strikeouts, tying a major league record. Also, on June 19, Sale had his 6th consecutive game with 10 or more strikeouts. On June 30 against the St. Louis Cardinals, Sale struck out 12 batters to tie a major league record with his eighth consecutive start of 10 or more strikeouts. He shared the record with Pedro Martínez, who accomplished the feat while pitching for the Boston Red Sox in 1999.

On October 2, versus the Detroit Tigers, Sale set the franchise record for number of strikeouts in a season. The previous record of 269 strikeouts in a season was held by Hall of Famer Ed Walsh in 1908. Walsh accomplished the feat in 464 innings, while Sale's 270th strikeout came amid his 203rd inning of 2015. He finished the season 13–11 with a 3.41 ERA, and led the majors in strikeouts per 9 innings (11.82) and hit by pitch (13).

==== 2016 ====
Sale began the 2016 season by winning each of his first 9 starts. He entered the All-Star Break with a 14–3 record (12 quality starts), an ERA of 3.38, and a WHIP of 1.04. Royals manager Ned Yost named him the starter for the MLB All-Star Game. In the All-Star Game, Sale pitched one inning and gave up a home run to Kris Bryant of the Cubs.

On July 23, prior to a game against the Detroit Tigers, the White Sox were set to wear throwback uniforms based on the design implemented by Bill Veeck during his second ownership of the White Sox. Sale was not pleased about the idea, as he felt the pullover jerseys were too baggy and interfered with his pitching mechanics, and this prompted him to use scissors to tear up the throwback uniforms that had been laid out in the clubhouse while the rest of the team was on the field for practice. Shortly after, the White Sox sent Sale home and scratched him from his start that day, and the White Sox took the field in their 1982–86 throwbacks instead. The next day, on July 24, the White Sox suspended Sale for five days. He later expressed regret for his actions. In 2016, Sale made 32 starts, finishing with a 17–10 record, a 3.34 ERA, and 233 strikeouts, in 226 2/3 innings pitched. He also led the majors with six complete games and 17 hit batsmen.

=== Boston Red Sox (2017–2023) ===
On December 6, 2016, the White Sox traded Sale to the Boston Red Sox for Yoán Moncada, Michael Kopech, Luis Alexander Basabe, and Víctor Díaz. Upon joining Boston, Sale switched his uniform number from 49 to 41 because 49 is unofficially retired for Tim Wakefield.

==== 2017 ====
With the 2017 Red Sox, Sale began the season by striking out 10 or more batters in eight consecutive starts, tying the major league record he already shared with Pedro Martínez. After going 11–4 with a 2.75 ERA and an MLB leading 178 strikeouts in the first half, Sale was named the AL's starting pitcher at the All-Star Game for the second consecutive season, the first pitcher to do so since Randy Johnson started for the NL in 2000 and 2001 and the first for the AL since Dave Stieb in 1983–84. Sale pitched two scoreless innings in the game, striking out two batters. In his second start after the All-Star break, Sale joined Johnson, Martínez and Nolan Ryan as the only four pitchers to have struck out 200 batters in their first 20 starts of a season. Pitching against the Toronto Blue Jays on August 29, Sale recorded his 1,500th career strikeout, becoming the fastest to do so in terms of innings pitched. At that point, he had reached 1,290 innings, surpassing Kerry Wood, who had done so in 1,303 innings. Sale reached 300 strikeouts for the season when he struck out 13 batters on September 20. It was the first 300 strikeout season since Clayton Kershaw in 2015, and the first in the AL since Martínez in 1999.

In 32 starts in 2017, Sale finished with a 17–8 record, a 2.90 ERA, and an MLB-leading 308 strikeouts. He again led the majors in strikeouts per 9 innings (12.93). The Red Sox clinched the AL East division with a 93–69 record.

In the first postseason appearance of his MLB career, Sale was the starting pitcher in Game 1 of the AL Division Series (ALDS) against the Houston Astros. He allowed nine hits and seven runs in five innings, taking the loss. Sale then pitched in relief in Game 4, allowing four hits and two runs in 4 2/3 innings and again taking the loss, as the Astros eliminated the Red Sox with a 5–4 win. Sale had a postseason ERA of 8.38 while striking out 12 and walking one in 9 2/3 innings pitched. Despite being the favorite to win the AL Cy Young award throughout the entire regular season, Sale finished second in the voting behind Corey Kluber, who won the award for a second time. Despite pitching more innings and recording more strikeouts than anyone else in baseball that season, Sale's subpar finish to the season after a blistering start (13–4 with a 2.37 ERA and 211 strikeouts in 148 1/3 innings (21 starts) before August 1, but 4–4 with a 4.09 ERA in 66 innings (11 starts) and 13 home runs allowed after August 1) combined with Kluber's masterful run after an abysmal start to the season followed by a month-long stint on the DL (3–2 with a 5.06 ERA in 37 1/3 innings (six starts) before May 2, but 15–2 with 224 strikeouts, a 1.62 ERA in 166 1/3 innings (23 starts), 4 complete games and a 9.74 K/BB ratio after June 1) cost Sale his best chance yet at winning the Cy Young. He did, however, finish ninth in the AL MVP voting, becoming the first Red Sox pitcher to finish that high since Pedro Martínez finished fifth in 2000.

==== 2018 ====
Sale was the Opening Day starting pitcher for the 2018 Red Sox. Facing the Tampa Bay Rays at Tropicana Field, he pitched six innings, giving up just one hit and walking three, while striking out nine. However, the Rays scored six runs in the eighth inning off of Boston's bullpen, defeating the Red Sox, 6–4, and leaving Sale with a no decision. During June, Sale had a 1.76 ERA over six starts and recorded 60 strikeouts in 41 innings; he was named the AL Pitcher of the Month. On July 6, Sale pitched six innings while allowing just one run against the Kansas City Royals, getting the win. It was his ninth win of the season (against four losses), and the 100th win of his MLB career. Two days later, Sale was named to the All-Star Game; he was named the AL starting pitcher, for the third consecutive year, on July 16. On July 31, he was placed on the disabled list due to left shoulder inflammation; at that point in the season, he had an 11–4 record with 2.04 ERA in 22 starts. He was activated on August 12, and was the winning pitcher of that day's game against Baltimore. On August 18, Sale was again placed on the 10-day disabled list—retroactive to August 15—due to inflammation of the same shoulder. He was activated on September 11, pitching one inning in that day's game against Toronto.

Sale made two appearances, including one start, in the ALDS, allowing two earned runs in 6 1/3 innings. In the AL Championship Series, he made one appearance, a start, allowing two earned runs in four innings. On October 23, Sale started Game 1 of the World Series for the Red Sox at home at Fenway Park. He pitched four-plus innings, giving up three runs on five hits and striking out seven in a no decision. The Red Sox went on to win the game, 8–4. During Game 4, with the Red Sox trailing by four runs, Sale gained notoriety for shouting at his teammates in the dugout, imploring them to generate more offense (the team had only one hit through the first six innings). The Red Sox went on to win, 9–6, taking a three games to one lead in the series. In Game 5, Sale became a World Series champion for the first time, closing out the final inning, including a series-ending strikeout of Manny Machado. Overall, in 15 1/3 postseason innings he allowed seven earned runs while striking out 24 batters.

==== 2019 ====
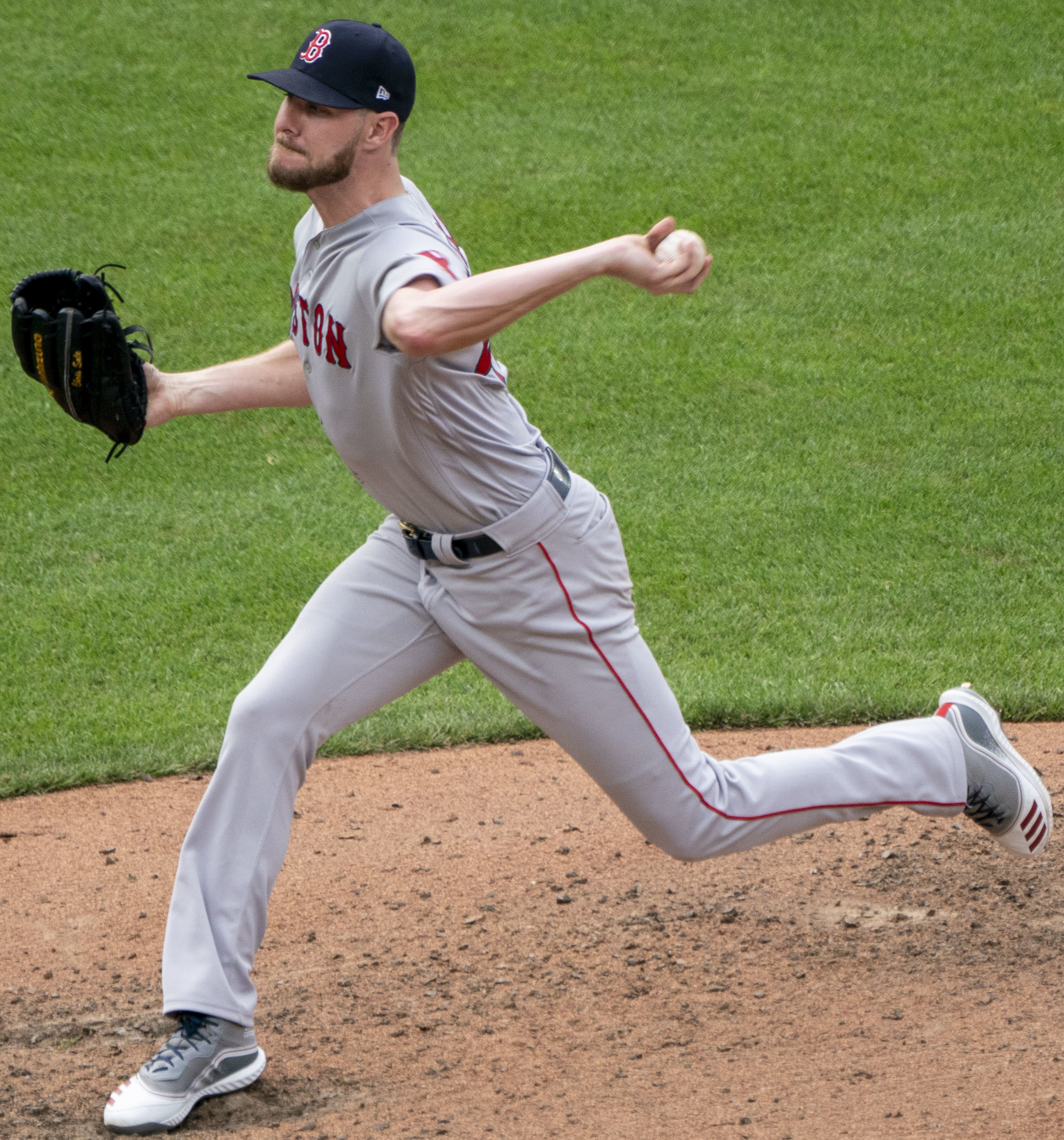
Sale delivers a pitch for the Red Sox in 2019

On March 23, 2019, Sale signed a five-year, $145 million extension with the Red Sox. Sale earned $15 million in 2019 via a club option in his prior contract, with the extension covering 2020 through 2024 plus a vesting option for 2025. Manager Alex Cora named Sale as Boston's starting pitcher for Opening Day. Sale started the season 0–4 with an 8.50 ERA, a performance he called "flat-out embarrassing." On May 8, Sale threw an immaculate inning for the first time in his career, striking out three straight Orioles batters on a total of nine pitches. On May 14 against Colorado, Sale struck out 17 batters, a new career-high; he left after seven innings and received a no decision as Boston lost in extra innings. He pitched his second immaculate inning on June 5, in a complete-game shutout against Kansas City, striking out 12. On August 13, Sale recorded the 2,000th strikeout of his major league career; he reached that mark in 1,626 innings pitched, the fewest innings needed to accomplish the feat in MLB history. On August 17, Sale was placed on the 10-day injured list due to left elbow inflammation, retroactive to August 14. After meeting with James Andrews on August 19, it was determined that Sale did not need surgery; however, the inflammation in his elbow was expected to end his season. On September 1, the Red Sox moved him to the 60-day injured list. For the 2019 season, Sale had a 6–11 record with 4.40 ERA and 218 strikeouts in 147 1/3 innings. He had 14 games with 10+ strikeouts, including a period from April 21 to June 26 when he recorded 10+ strikeouts in 10 out of 13 starts.

==== 2020 ====
On February 27, 2020, Red Sox manager Ron Roenicke announced that Sale would not be ready for Opening Day due to his progress in spring training being hampered by pneumonia. Two weeks later, the season was delayed due to COVID-19 pandemic concerns. On March 19, the team announced that Sale would undergo Tommy John surgery, thereby ending his 2020 season. On March 30, the Red Sox announced that Sale successfully underwent the surgery, which was performed in Los Angeles. On June 28, days before the restart of preseason training, the team placed Sale on the 45-day injured list (reduced from 60-day for 2020).

In an article in The New York Times, "Was That Pitcher's Surgery Truly Essential?", columnist Tyler Kepner discussed the Tommy John surgery of both Sale and Noah Syndergaard in a time when the coronavirus pandemic had led federal, state, and local authorities to restrict medical procedures to essential services only. Sale, who had been receiving treatment by Andrews at his Florida clinic, had his surgery performed at the Cedars-Sinai Medical Center in Los Angeles after Andrews suspended all non-emergency medical surgery in compliance with Florida's coronavirus pandemic policy.

==== 2021 ====
On February 18, 2021, Sale was placed on the 60-day injured list as he continued to recover from Tommy John surgery. He later stated that he had "a mild case" of COVID-19 in January. On June 8, Sale threw a practice session in the bullpen at Fenway Park for the first time since 2019. On July 15, the team optioned Sale to the Florida Complex League (FCL) for a rehabilitation assignment. He pitched three innings for the FCL Red Sox on July 15, allowing no runs on four hits while striking out five batters. The team next sent him to Double-A on a rehabilitation assignment, where he pitched 3 2/3 innings for the Portland Sea Dogs on July 20 without allowing a hit. He subsequently pitched in Triple-A for the Worcester Red Sox. Sale was added to Boston's active roster on August 14, for a start against the Orioles.

On August 26 against Minnesota, Sale recorded the third immaculate inning of his career. He tied a record set by Sandy Koufax for the most major-league immaculate innings thrown. On September 10, Sale was placed on the COVID-related injured list, due to a positive test; he returned to the team on September 17. Overall during the regular season, Sale made nine starts for Boston, pitching to a 5–1 record with 3.16 ERA and striking out 52 batters in 42 2/3 innings. In the postseason, Sale made three starts, taking one loss and allowing 10 runs (eight earned) in nine innings as the Red Sox advanced to the American League Championship Series.

==== 2022 ====
In February, Sale sustained a right rib stress fracture while throwing batting practice at Florida Gulf Coast University. Prior to the start of the regular season, he was placed on the 60-day injured list. On July 1, Sale pitched for the Portland Sea Dogs in a rehabilitation assignment, allowing one run on four hits in four innings while striking out seven batters. During a rehab start in Triple-A on July 7, a video captured Sale destroying items in the dugout tunnel after he issued five walks and allowed one run in 3 2/3 innings. He returned to Boston's lineup on July 12, receiving a no decision after allowing no runs on three hits in five innings. On July 17, he suffered a left fifth-finger fracture after being struck by a line drive hit by Aaron Hicks. Sale underwent surgery, involving open reduction and internal fixation, the next day. He was officially added to the injured list on July 22. On August 6, Sale broke his right wrist while riding his bicycle to lunch, ending his season. Chief Baseball Officer Chaim Bloom commented that the Red Sox needed to find whoever had a "Chris Sale voodoo doll", referring to his list of injuries since the 2019 season. In two starts for the Red Sox, Sale posted an 0–1 record with 3.18 ERA while striking out five batters in 5 2/3 innings.

==== 2023 ====
Sale began the season in Boston's rotation, posting a 5–2 record with a 4.58 ERA through 11 starts. On June 1, he was removed from a game against the Cincinnati Reds after experiencing shoulder discomfort; he was placed on the injured list the next day. On June 9, Sale was transferred to the 60-day injured list after being diagnosed with a stress reaction in the scapula. He was activated for a start against the Detroit Tigers on August 11. He finished the season with a 6–5 record and a 4.30 ERA in 20 starts. He pitched over 102 2/3 innings, more than double what he pitched in 2021 and 2022 combined.

=== Atlanta Braves (2024–present) ===
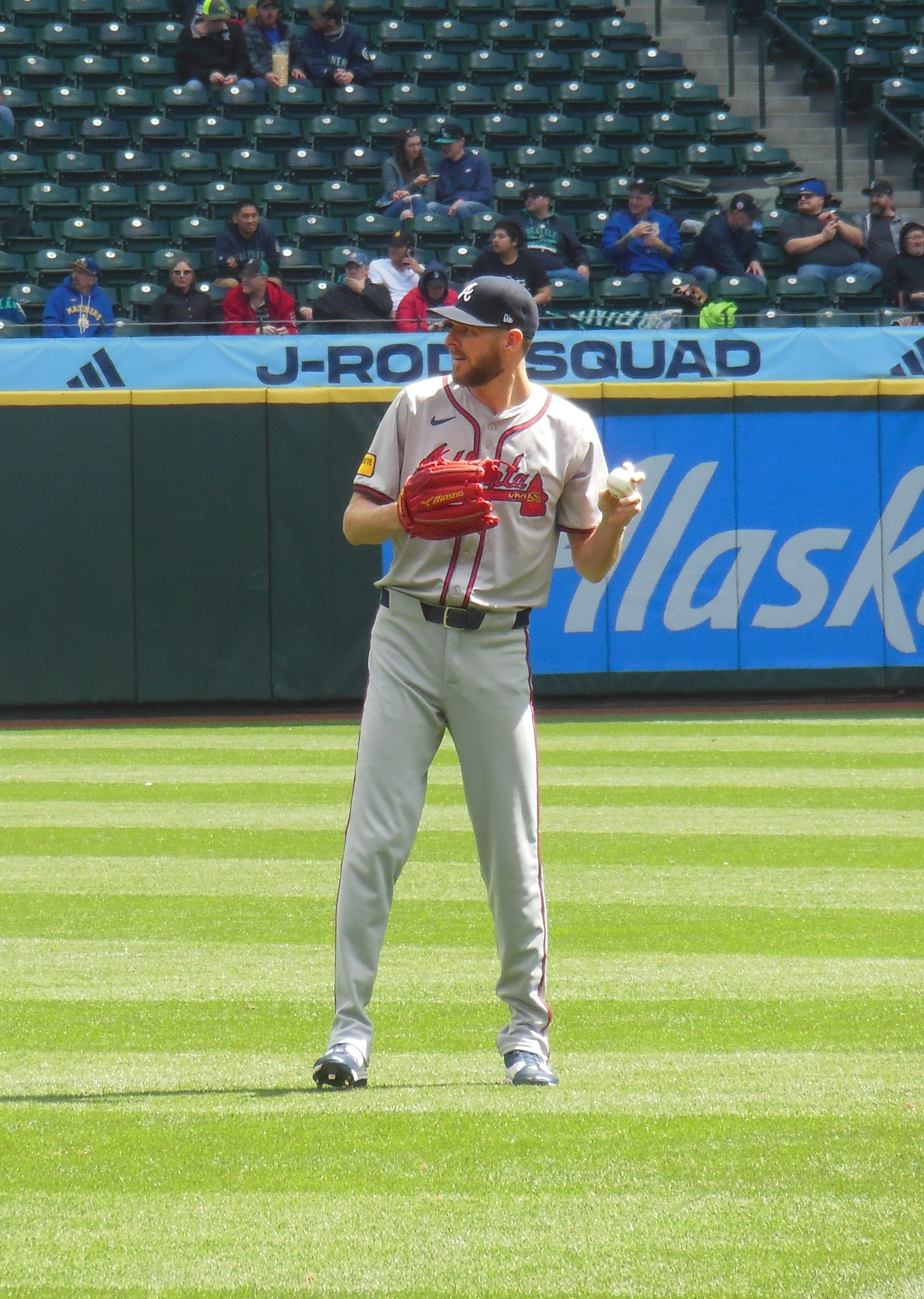
Sale warming up before a start for the Braves in 2024

On December 30, 2023, the Red Sox traded Sale and cash considerations to the Atlanta Braves in exchange for Vaughn Grissom. Days later, Sale signed a two-year, $38 million contract extension with the Braves with an $18 million club option for the 2026 season.

==== 2024 ====
Sale was selected to the 2024 All-Star Game roster as a reserve, alongside teammates Marcell Ozuna and Reynaldo López.

On August 13, against the San Francisco Giants, Sale recorded his 11th game with no earned runs, 3 or fewer hits allowed, and at least 12 strikeouts, tying Sandy Koufax for third-most all-time, behind Nolan Ryan (23) and Randy Johnson (13). That same game, he and Giants pitcher Blake Snell matched shutout innings for six innings; the game was decided in extras, with the Braves winning 1–0. On September 3, Sale recorded his 200th strikeout of the season while facing the Colorado Rockies. It was the eighth time in his career and the first time in five seasons that Sale had reached the milestone. He also set a franchise record by allowing two or fewer earned runs in 15 consecutive starts.

Sale finished the regular season with a record of 18–3 and led the NL in ERA (2.38), strikeouts (225), and wins (18). He became the first Braves pitcher to win a Triple Crown. Detroit Tigers pitcher Tarik Skubal earned the Triple Crown in the AL, marking the first time since 2011 that the milestone had been achieved in both leagues. Sale also won a Gold Glove Award, the NL Comeback Player of the Year Award, was named to the All-MLB First Team, and won the NL Cy Young Award, all career firsts. Skubal also won the AL Cy Young Award, marking the third time in major league history that both Cy Young recipients in one season were left-handed pitchers.

==== 2025 ====
On May 29, 2025, Sale recorded his 2,500th strikeout in the sixth inning against the Philadelphia Phillies when he struck out Edmundo Sosa. He became the 38th pitcher in MLB's modern era (since 1901) and the 40th pitcher in MLB history to reach this mark. Sale also became the fastest to reach 2,500 strikeouts in 2,026 innings, breaking the record of 2,107 2/3 innings by Randy Johnson. On June 18, Sale pitched 8 2/3 scoreless innings against the New York Mets, for his longest appearance since a complete game shutout on June 5, 2019. During the ninth inning, he made a diving play from the mound, which was later attributed as the cause of a fractured rib cage. Sale was transferred to the 60-day injured list on July 1. Sale made the All-Star Game roster as a player and coach selection. Sale returned to the active roster on August 30.

==== 2026 ====
On February 24, 2026, Sale and the Braves agreed to a one-year, $27 million contract extension through 2027, which included a club option for 2028. On April 26, Sale picked up his 150th career win against the Philadelphia Phillies, where he pitched six innings, allowed only one hit, walked two batters, and struck out nine in a 6–2 victory. On July 4, Sale recorded his 500th strikeout as a Brave, and was selected to the tenth All-Star Game of his career. He was named NL Pitcher of the Month in July (for the sixth time across both leagues), posting a 4–0 record and 2.00 ERA with 34 strikeouts in 27 innings in the month.

On August 27, 2026, Sale pitched his first complete game since 2019 in a 1–0 win over the Los Angeles Dodgers, completing a series sweep in a late-season matchup of division leaders. Sale gave up five hits, struck out 11 batters and walked none on 109 pitches. It was his fourth double-digit strikeout game of the season and the 95th of his career, seventh-most in major league history. It was his seventeenth career complete game and fourth shutout. Sale's 100.1 mph pitch to Shohei Ohtani in the third inning was his first 100+ mph fastball since July 2018. The win came against Dodgers counterpart ace, Yoshinobu Yamamoto, who gave up a home run to Drake Baldwin with his first pitch, which proved to be the game-winner. In Sale's final start of the regular season, he threw his 200th strikeout, matching Randy Johnson for most 200-strikeout seasons by a left-handed pitcher.

In November, Sale finished third in voting for the National League Cy Young Award, after Jacob Misiorowski and Cristopher Sánchez, and was named to his second All-MLB First Team.

== Awards and achievements ==
Award	Times	Year	Ref
Atlantic Sun Conference Pitcher of the Year	1	2010	
Collegiate Baseball Player of the Year	1	2010	
Cy Young Award	1	2024	
Major League Baseball All-Star	10	2012–2018, 2024–2026	
MLB Pitcher of the Month	6	2012 May, 2015 June, 2018 June–July, 2024 May, 2026 July	
The Sporting News Starting Pitcher of the Year	3	2017, 2018, 2024	
Gold Glove Award	1	2024	
NL Comeback Player of the Year	1	2024	

Major League Baseball records
Achievement	Number of Innings	Ref
Fewest innings pitched to reach 2,000 strikeouts	1,626	
Fewest innings pitched to reach 2,500 strikeouts	2,026	

Major League Baseball annual statistical leader
Category	Times	Dates
Adjusted ERA+ leader	2	2014, 2024
Complete games leader	2	2013, 2016
Fielding independent pitching leader	3	2015, 2017, 2024
Hit batsmen leader	2	2015, 2016
Innings pitched leader	1	2017
Strikeout leader	3	2015, 2017, 2024
Strikeout-to-walk ratio leader	1	2015
Strikeouts per 9 innings pitched leader	4	2014, 2015, 2017, 2024
Notes: Through 2025 season. Per Baseball Reference.

== Pitching style ==
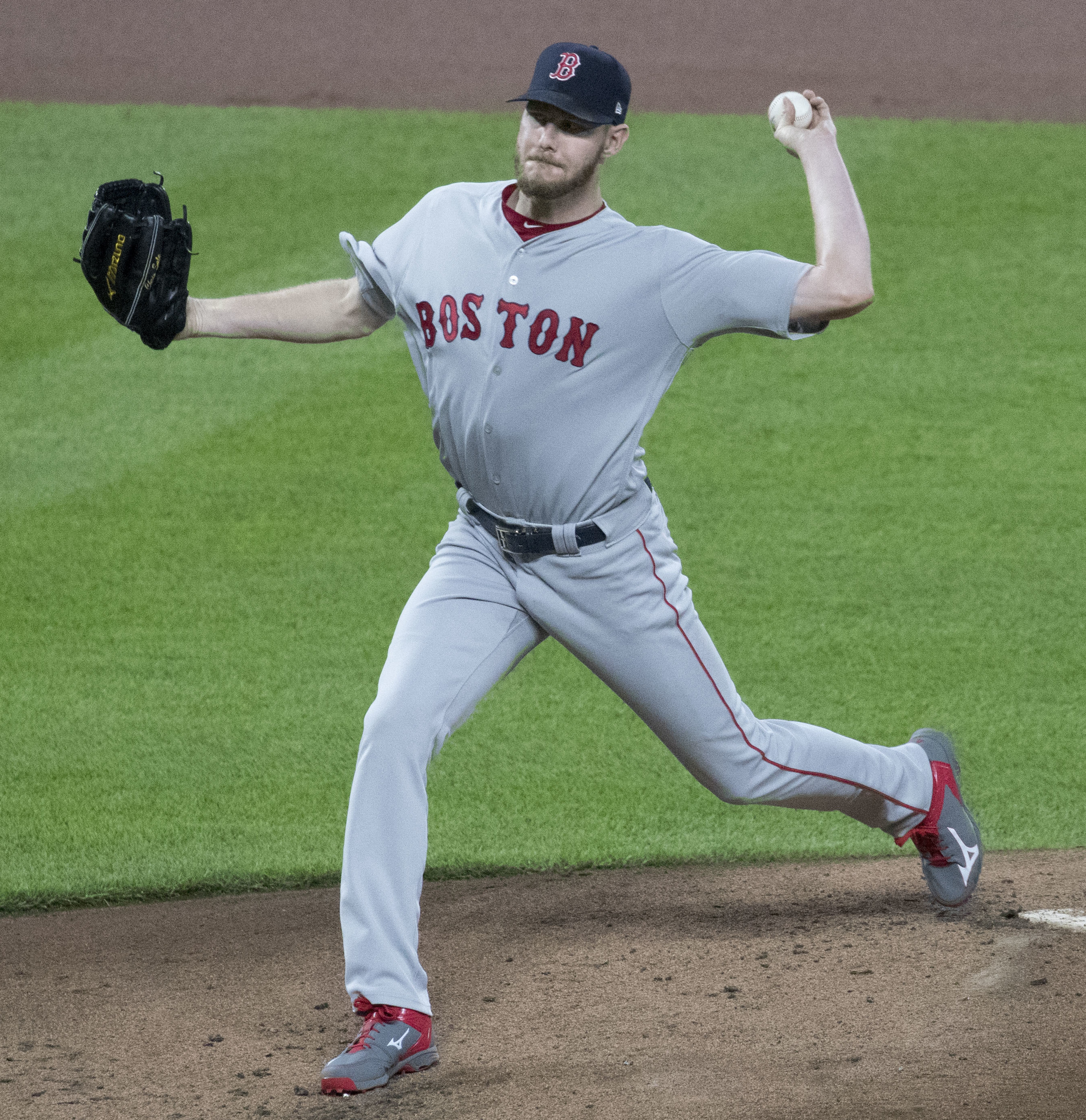
Sale delivers a pitch for the Red Sox in 2017

Sale relies on four pitches: a fastball he throws between 93–101 miles per hour (150–163 km/h), a changeup at 83–89 miles per hour (134–143 km/h), a sinker at 90–94 miles per hour (145–151 km/h), and a slider at 77–84 miles per hour (124–135 km/h). The slider, which carries a career whiff rate of 38%, is Sale's most common two-strike pitch to hitters from both sides of the plate.

Sale throws with a "funky" sidearm throwing motion, a modified motion that he learned while he stayed in college after being drafted in 2007. He is nicknamed "The Condor" because his unorthodox delivery makes him resemble a California condor. His moniker was first coined on SB Nation's South Side Sox site on April 17, 2012.

== Personal life ==
Sale and his wife have three sons. They reside in Naples, Florida.

== See also ==
- List of Major League Baseball career WHIP leaders
- List of Major League Baseball career strikeout leaders
- List of Major League Baseball annual strikeout leaders
- List of Major League Baseball pitchers who have thrown an immaculate inning

Awards and achievements
Preceded by Jake Peavy; Dallas Keuchel; Justin Verlander; Ranger Suárez; Logan Webb	Major League Baseball Pitcher of the Month; May 2012; June 2015; June–July 2018; May 2024; July 2026	Succeeded by Matt Harrison; Scott Kazmir; Blake Snell; Cristopher Sánchez; Jesús Luzardo
