= Nathaniel Lowe =

American baseball player (born 1995)

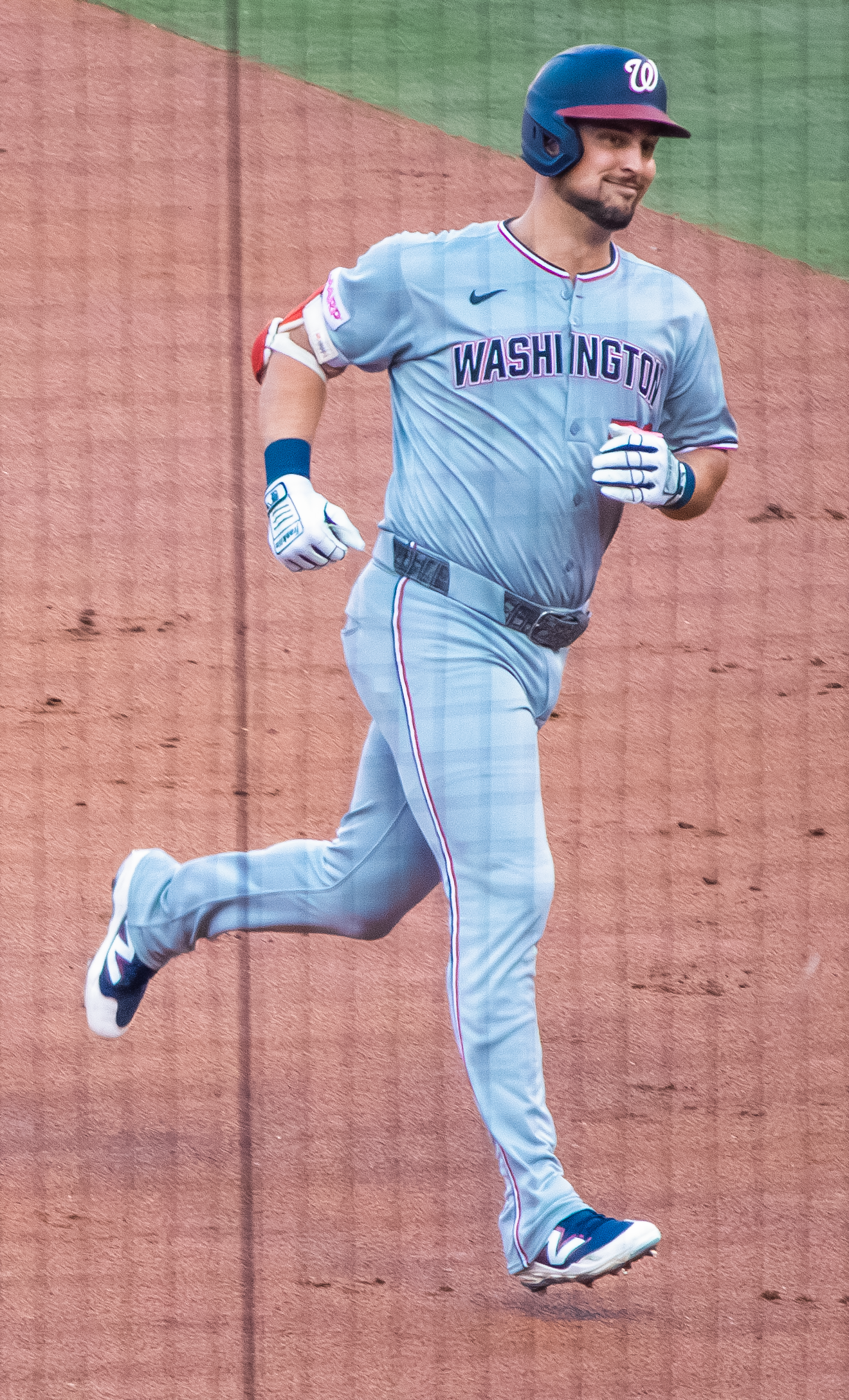
- Lowe with the Washington Nationals

Free agent
- First baseman
- Born: July 7, 1995 (age 31); Norfolk, Virginia, U.S.
- Bats: Left Throws: Right

MLB debut
- April 29, 2019, for the Tampa Bay Rays

MLB statistics (through 2026 season)
- Batting average: .262
- Home runs: 124
- Runs batted in: 477
- Stats at Baseball Reference

Teams
- Tampa Bay Rays (2019–2020); Texas Rangers (2021–2024); Washington Nationals (2025); Boston Red Sox (2025); Cincinnati Reds (2026); Cleveland Guardians (2026)

Career highlights and awards
- World Series champion (2023); Silver Slugger Award (2022); Gold Glove Award (2023)

David Nathaniel Lowe (/loʊ/ LOH; born July 7, 1995) is an American professional baseball first baseman who is a free agent. He has played in Major League Baseball (MLB) for the Tampa Bay Rays, Texas Rangers, Washington Nationals, Boston Red Sox, Cincinnati Reds, and Cleveland Guardians. He made his MLB debut in 2019 with the Rays.

== Amateur career ==
Lowe attended Pope High School in Marietta, Georgia, where he also played upright bass in orchestra and jazz bands. He enrolled at Mercer University and played college baseball for the Mercer Bears in 2014. He transferred to St. Johns River State College for the 2015 season, and transferred to Mississippi State University to play for the Mississippi State Bulldogs for 2016. That year, he was named a second-team All-American by Louisville Slugger.

== Professional career ==
=== Tampa Bay Rays ===
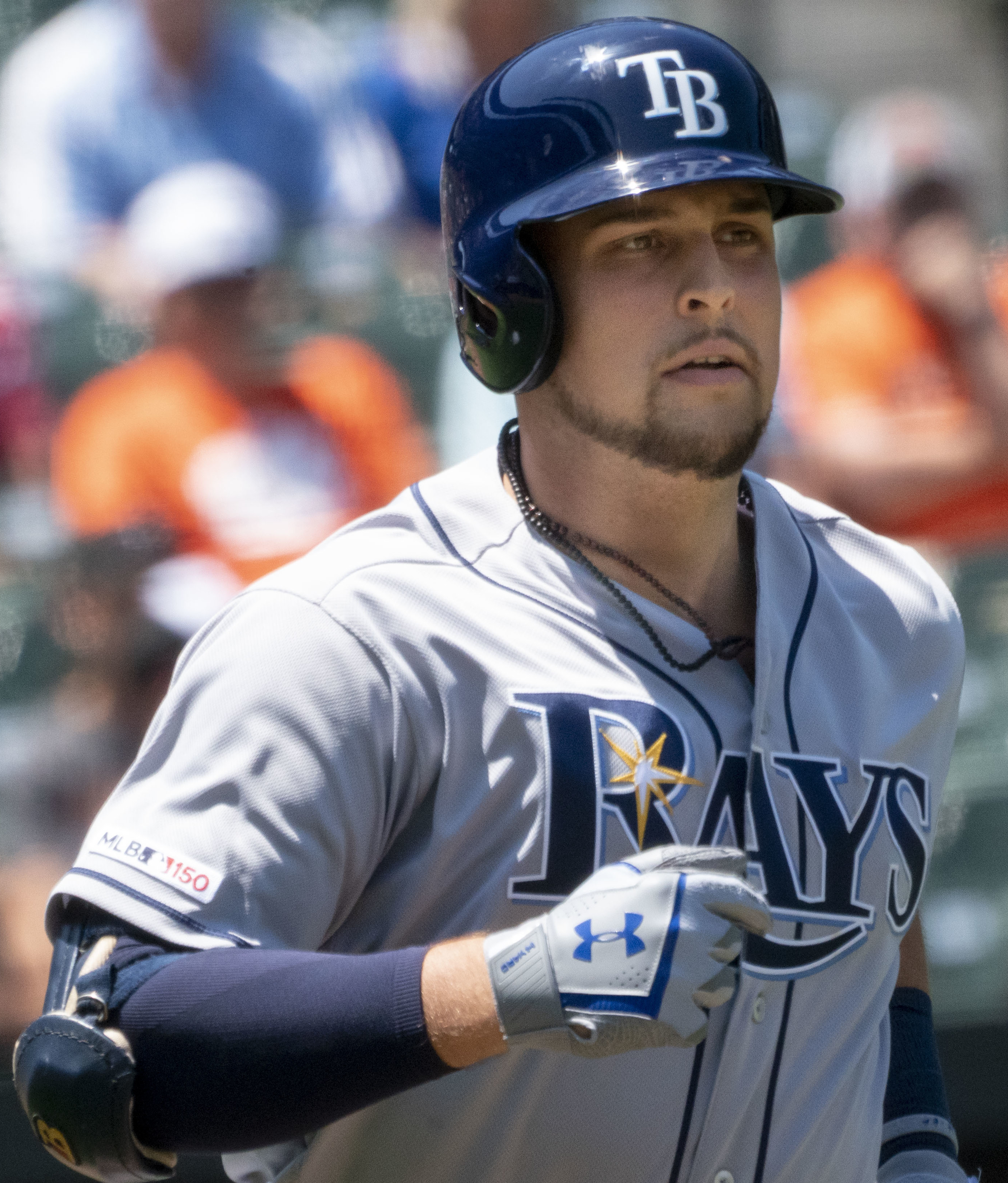
Lowe with the Tampa Bay Rays

The Tampa Bay Rays selected Lowe in the 13th round, with the 390th overall selection, of the 2016 Major League Baseball draft. He signed and made his professional debut with the Hudson Valley Renegades of the Low–A New York-Penn League, batting .300/.382/.437 with four home runs and 40 runs batted in (RBI) in 67 games. He played for both the Bowling Green Hot Rods of the Single–A Midwest League and the Charlotte Stone Crabs of the High–A Florida State League in 2017, hitting .274 with seven home runs and 59 RBI in 115 games between both teams.

Lowe began the 2018 season with Charlotte. He received a midseason promotion to the Montgomery Biscuits of the Double–A Southern League, and was named to represent the Rays in the 2018 All-Star Futures Game. The Rays promoted Lowe again, to the Durham Bulls of the Triple–A International League, in August. Lowe was named to the 2018 MLB Pipeline team of the year after hitting .330/.416/.568 with 27 home runs and 102 RBI in 130 games between the three clubs. He returned to Durham to begin 2019.

The Rays promoted Lowe to the major leagues for the first time on April 29, 2019. On July 5, he hit his first major league home run against the New York Yankees. On July 13, Lowe recorded his first multi home run game. In 2020 for the Rays, Lowe appeared in 21 games, slashing .224/.316/.433 with 4 home runs 11 RBI in 76 at–bats.

=== Texas Rangers ===
On December 10, 2020, the Rays traded Lowe to the Texas Rangers along with Jake Guenther and Carl Chester in exchange for Heriberto Hernández, Osleivis Basabe, and Alexander Ovalles. Over 157 games in 2021, Lowe hit .264/.357/.415/.771 with 18 home runs and 72 RBIs.

On June 15, 2022, Lowe became the first player to strike out in two immaculate innings in one game versus the Houston Astros. It was also the first occurrence in major league history of more than one immaculate inning thrown on the same date. The first was hurled in the second inning by starter Luis Garcia and the second in the seventh inning by reliever Phil Maton.

Lowe hit into 3–6 triple play in the fourth inning on August 22, lining out to Minnesota Twins first baseman José Miranda, who put out Corey Seager and threw to shortstop Carlos Correa to put out Marcus Semien at second base. For the week ending August 28, 2022, Lowe was named AL Player of the Week. In six games, he batted .385/.407/.923/1.331 (10-for-26) with four home runs and 11 RBI. He led all MLB players in RBI, home runs (tied), and total bases (tied-24).

Lowe finished the 2022 season hitting .302/.358/.492/.851 with 27 home runs and 76 RBI. He received the 2022 American League Silver Slugger Award for first basemen.

On January 13, 2023, Lowe agreed to a one-year, $4.05 million contract with the Rangers for the 2023 season, avoiding salary arbitration. Over 161 games in 2023, Lowe hit .262/.360/.414/.775 with 17 home runs and 82 RBI. Lowe and Texas won the 2023 World Series. Lowe won the American League Gold Glove Award for first base in 2023, the first of his career.

In 2024, Lowe played in 140 games for the Rangers, batting .265/.361/.401 with 16 home runs and 69 RBI.

=== Washington Nationals ===
On December 22, 2024, the Rangers traded Lowe to the Washington Nationals in exchange for Robert Garcia. His salary for the 2025 season was set at $10.3 million by the arbitration process. On June 21, 2025, Lowe hit his 100th career home run against the Los Angeles Dodgers off pitcher Dustin May. On August 13, Lowe hit his first grand slam home run, in a game against the Kansas City Royals. One day later, Lowe was designated for assignment, following Dylan Crews' activation from the injured list. In 119 appearances for Washington, Lowe slashed .216/.292/.373 with 16 home runs and 68 RBI. He was placed on release waivers by the Nationals on August 16.

=== Boston Red Sox ===
On August 18, 2025, the Boston Red Sox signed Lowe to a one-year, major league contract. He made 34 appearances for Boston, batting .280/.370/.420 with two home runs and 16 RBI. Lowe was designated for assignment by the Red Sox on November 18. On November 21, he was non-tendered by Boston and became a free agent.

=== Cincinnati Reds ===
On February 13, 2026, Lowe signed a minor league contract with the Cincinnati Reds. On March 23, the Reds selected Lowe's contract after he made the team's Opening Day roster.

=== Cleveland Guardians ===
On August 3, 2026, the Reds traded Lowe to the Cleveland Guardians in exchange for minor league pitcher Alejandro Rivera.

== Personal life ==
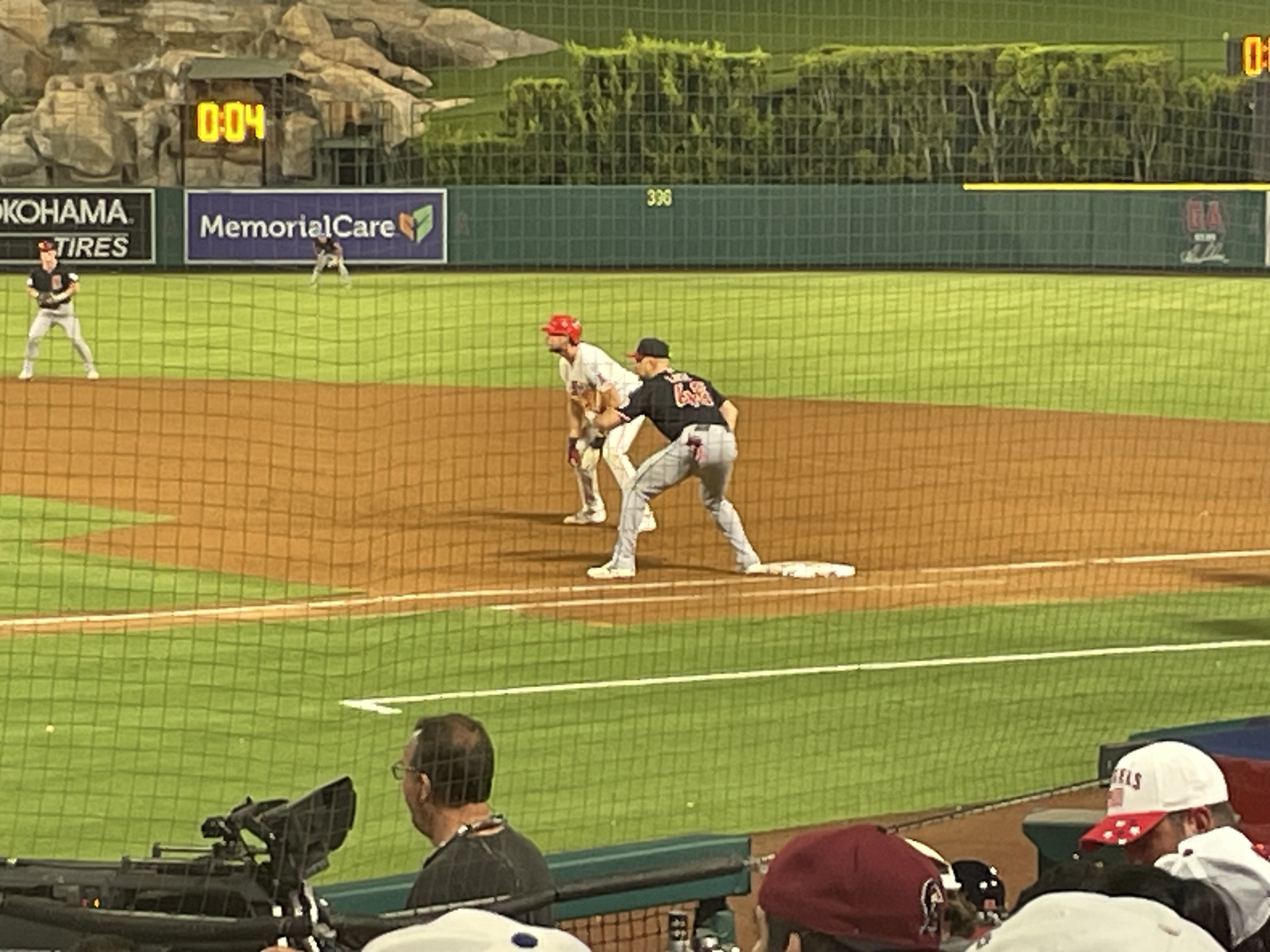
Nathaniel and his brother Josh at first base in Angel Stadium .

His brother, Josh Lowe, is also a baseball player. They were teammates on Bowling Green and Charlotte. They were also in the Tampa Bay Rays organization at the same time, but did not share a Major League roster. His father, David, was drafted by the Seattle Mariners in the 1986 MLB draft, but instead attended the U.S. Naval Academy and became a naval aviator and career fighter pilot in the U.S. Navy for 20 years.

Prior to the 2021 MLB season, Lowe was known as Nate Lowe. However, Lowe's mother asked for him to be known as Nathaniel professionally after seeing a birthday tweet by Bally Sports Southwest calling him Nate.
