= Yoán Moncada =

Cuban baseball player (born 1995)

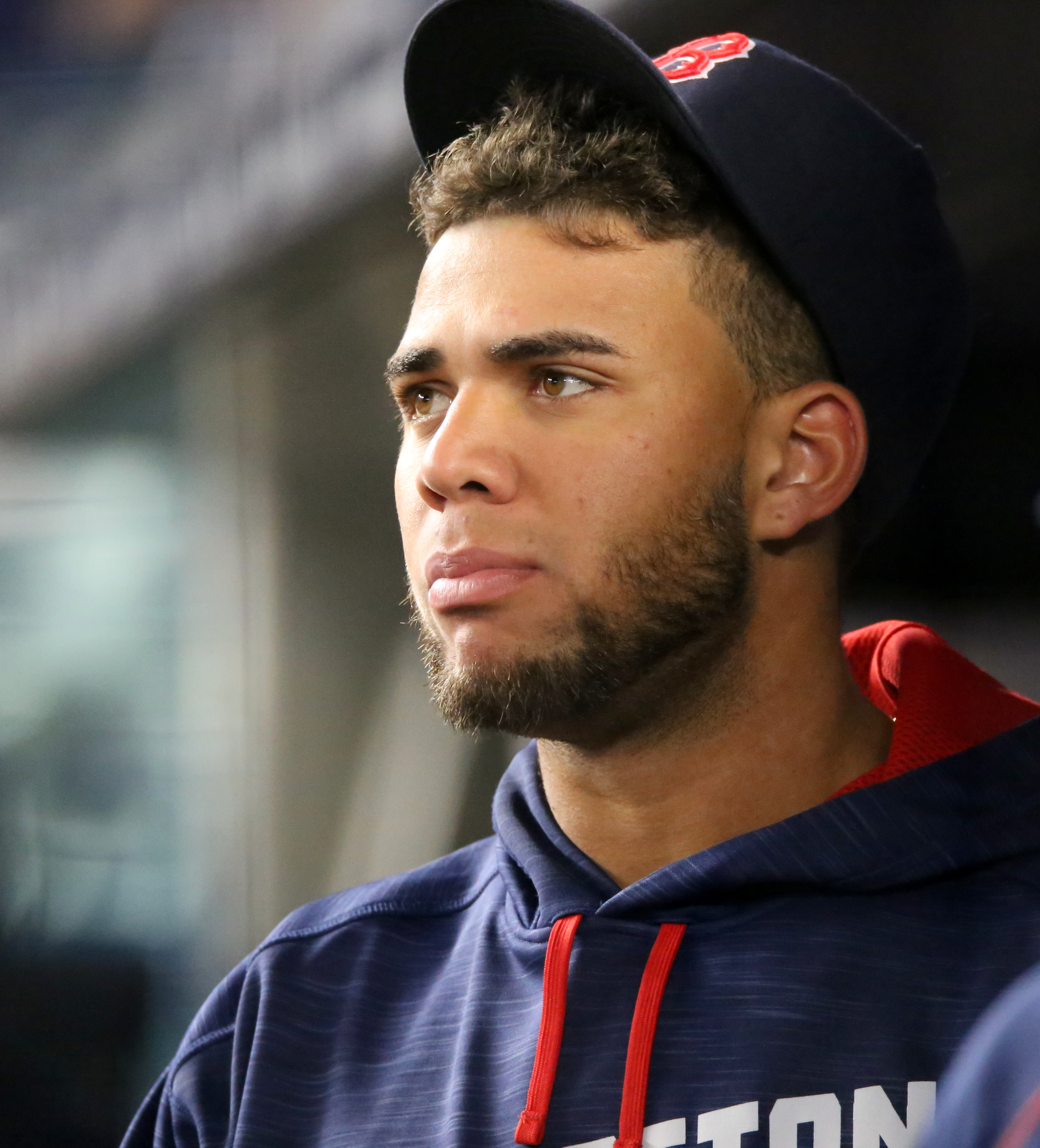
- Moncada with the Boston Red Sox in 2016

Free agent
- Third baseman
- Born: May 27, 1995 (age 31); Abreus, Cuba
- Bats: Switch Throws: Right

MLB debut
- September 2, 2016, for the Boston Red Sox

MLB statistics (through 2026 season)
- Batting average: .250
- Home runs: 108
- Runs batted in: 384
- Stats at Baseball Reference

Teams
- Boston Red Sox (2016); Chicago White Sox (2017–2024); Los Angeles Angels (2025–2026)
Medals
Men's baseball
Representing Cuba
World Youth Baseball Championship
Silver medal – second place	2011 Mexico	Cuba
18U Baseball World Cup
Bronze medal – third place	2013 Taichung	Team
World Port Tournament
Gold medal – first place	2013 Rotterdam	Team

Yoán Manuel Moncada Olivera (born May 27, 1995) is a Cuban professional baseball third basemanwho is a free agent. He has played in Major League Baseball (MLB) for the Boston Red Sox, Chicago White Sox, and Los Angeles Angels. He made his MLB debut with the Red Sox in 2016, and was traded to the White Sox during the 2016–2017 offseason. He is one of the first active MLB players to represent the Cuban national team in international competition.

== Professional career ==
=== Elefantes de Cienfuegos ===
Moncada made his debut for Cienfuegos of the Cuban National Series in 2012. In his two years with Cienfuegos he hit .277/.388/.380 with four home runs and 21 stolen bases. Moncada left Cuba in June 2014. Before signing with the Red Sox, Moncada was a highly sought after Cuban free agent. He was seen as a generational, five-tool talent, being compared to the likes of Robinson Canó.

=== Boston Red Sox ===
==== Minor leagues ====
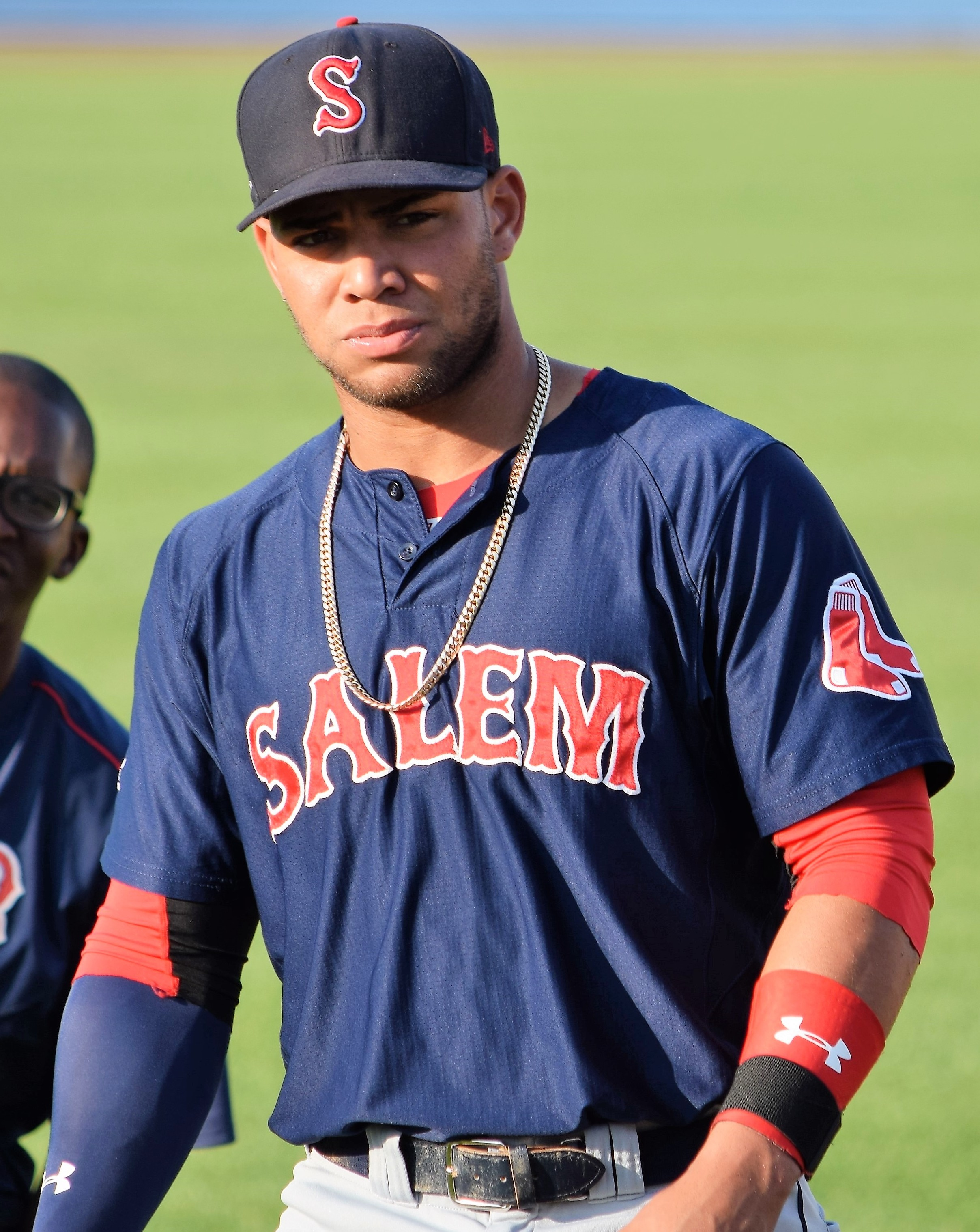
Moncada with the Salem Red Sox in 2016

On February 23, 2015, the Boston Red Sox reportedly agreed to terms with Moncada, for a signing bonus of $31.5 million. The contract was finalized on March 12. He made his professional debut with the Greenville Drive of the Class A South Atlantic League on May 18. In the winter of 2015, he was consistently cited as one of the top prospects in the Red Sox system.

Entering the 2016 season, MLB.com, Baseball America, and Baseball Prospectus ranked Moncada as one of the seven best prospects in Major League Baseball.

==== Major leagues ====
Moncada was called up and made his major league debut on September 2, 2016, against the Oakland Athletics. In his first plate appearance, he walked and subsequently scored a run. He recorded his first major league hit the following day. Moncada finished the 2016 MLB season with a .211 batting average (4-for-19) with one RBI.

=== Chicago White Sox ===
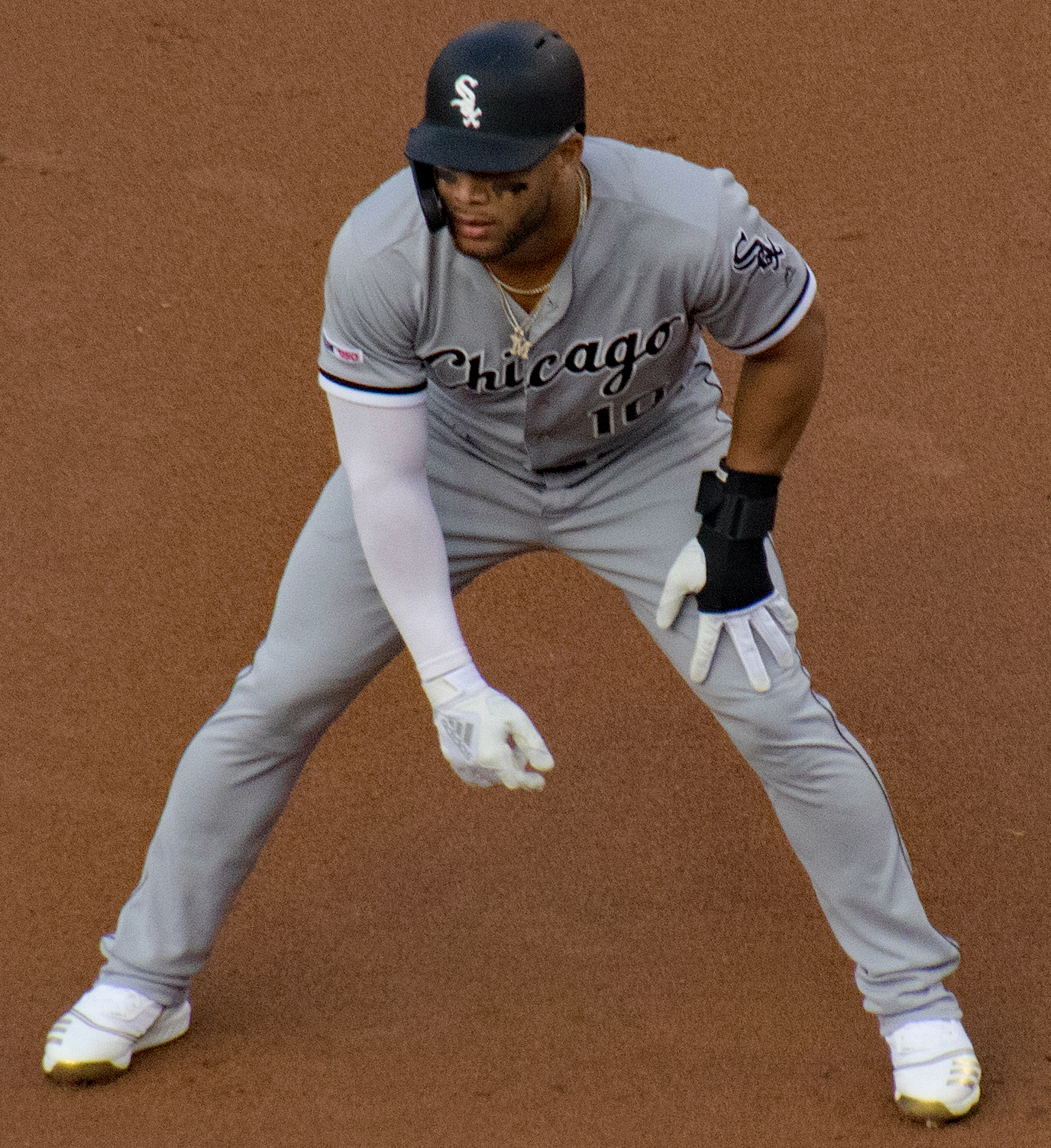
Moncada with the White Sox in 2019

On December 6, 2016, the Red Sox traded Moncada, Michael Kopech, Luis Alexander Basabe, and Victor Diaz to the Chicago White Sox for Chris Sale.

Moncada began the 2017 season with the Charlotte Knights of the Triple-A International League. On July 19, 2017, he was called up after the trade of Todd Frazier to the New York Yankees. Later that day, he made his White Sox debut against the Los Angeles Dodgers. He worked a walk in his first at bat, against Kenta Maeda.

On July 26, 2017, Moncada hit his first career major league home run off of Jake Arrieta of the Chicago Cubs. On August 25, he was placed on the 10-day disabled list due to shin issues. He played 54 games in 2017, finishing year with a .231 batting average, 8 home runs, and 22 RBIs.

In 2018, Moncada played 149 games, finishing with a .235 batting average, 32 doubles, 17 home runs, 61 RBI, and struck out an MLB-leading 217 times. He had the lowest fielding percentage among major league second basemen, at .963.

In the 2019 campaign, Moncada set career highs in numerous batting areas, such as hits (161), doubles (34), home runs (25), RBI (79), and batting average (.315), among others, with his batting average ranking third in the American League.

Overall, in 2020, Moncada batted .225 with six home runs and 24 RBI in 52 games. In 2021, Moncada batted .263 with 14 home runs and 61 RBI across 144 games for Chicago.

Moncada began the 2022 season on the injured list with an oblique strain. On May 9, Moncada was activated off the IL and made his season debut that day against the Cleveland Guardians, going 1-for-4. In 104 total games, he batted .212/.273/.353 with 12 home runs and 51 RBI. Moncada made 92 appearances for the White Sox in 2023, slashing .260/.305/.425 with 11 home runs and 40 RBI.

On April 10, 2024, Moncada suffered a strained adductor while running to first base, and was ruled out for 3-to-6 months. He was activated from the injured list on September 16. In 12 total games for the White Sox, Moncada batted .275/.356/.400 with one stolen base. The White Sox declined his team option for 2025 on November 1, making him a free agent.

=== Los Angeles Angels ===
On February 16, 2025, Moncada signed a one-year, $5 million contract with the Los Angeles Angels. He made 84 appearances for the Angels, slashing .234/.336/.448 with 12 home runs and 35 RBI.

On February 2, 2026, Moncada re-signed with Los Angeles on a one-year, $4 million contract. On May 22, Moncada was placed on the 10-day injured list with right knee inflammation. He had three home runs, 10 RBI, and a .189 batting average on the season up to that point. Moncada was moved to the 60-day IL on June 8. That same day, it was announced that Moncada would require knee surgery to address his injury.

== International career ==
Moncada was named to the Cuban national team for 2023 World Baseball Classic. Along with White Sox teammate Luis Robert Jr., he became the first active MLB player to play for the Cuban national team. In the tournament, Moncada batted .435/.519/.739, with a team-leading 10 hits in 23 at-bats.

== Musical career ==
In 2021, Moncada recorded "Desastre Personal" with artists El Chacal and Lenier.
