= Osleivis Basabe =

Venezuelan baseball player (born 2000)

Free agent
- Infielder
- Born: September 13, 2000 (age 26); Bobures, Zulia, Venezuela
- Bats: Right Throws: Right

MLB debut
- August 13, 2023, for the Tampa Bay Rays

MLB statistics (through 2026 season)
- Batting average: .208
- Home runs: 6
- Runs batted in: 25
- Stats at Baseball Reference

Teams
- Tampa Bay Rays (2023); San Francisco Giants (2026)

Osleivis José Basabe Chourio (born September 13, 2000) is a Venezuelan professional baseball infielder who is a free agent. He has previously played in Major League Baseball (MLB) for the Tampa Bay Rays and San Francisco Giants.

== Career ==
=== Texas Rangers ===
On December 23, 2017, Basabe signed with the Texas Rangers as an international free agent. He made his professional debut in 2018 with the Dominican Summer League Rangers, hitting .344/.414/.474 with 1 home run, 34 RBI, and 12 stolen bases. He split the 2019 season between the rookie–level Arizona League Rangers and Low–A Spokane Indians, hitting a combined .323.352/.398 with 32 RBI. Basabe did not play in a game in 2020 due to the cancellation of the minor league season because of the COVID-19 pandemic.

=== Tampa Bay Rays ===
On December 10, 2020, the Rangers traded Basabe, Heriberto Hernández, and Alexander Ovalles to the Tampa Bay Rays in exchange for Nathaniel Lowe, Jake Guenther, and Carl Chester. He split his first season in the Rays organization between the Charleston RiverDogs and Bowling Green Hot Rods, hitting .282/.347/.388/.734 with 3 home runs, 36 RBI, and 18 stolen bases. Basabe split the 2022 campaign between Bowling Green and the Montgomery Biscuits, hitting a combined .324/.385/.462/.847 with 4 home runs, 47 RBI, and 21 stolen bases.

On November 15, 2022, the Rays added Basabe to their 40-man roster to protect him from the Rule 5 draft. Basabe was optioned to the Triple-A Durham Bulls to begin the 2023 season. On August 13, Basabe was promoted to the major league for the first time. Basabe hit his first career home run, a grand slam against the Colorado Rockies, on August 22. In 31 games during his rookie campaign, he batted .218/.277/.310 with one home run and 12 RBI.

Basabe was optioned to Triple–A Durham to begin the 2024 season. In 66 games for Durham, he batted .248/.293/.336 with five home runs, 29 RBI, and four stolen bases. Basabe was designated for assignment following the acquisition of Alex Faedo on February 3, 2025.

=== San Francisco Giants ===
On February 6, 2025, Basabe was traded to the San Francisco Giants in exchange for cash considerations. He was optioned to the Triple-A Sacramento River Cats to begin the season, and hit .242/.287/.352 with four home runs, 20 RBI, and three stolen bases across 53 appearances. On June 11, Basabe was designated for assignment by San Francisco. He cleared waivers and was sent outright to Triple-A Sacramento on June 16.

On November 22, 2025, Basabe re-signed with the Giants on a minor league contract. He made 75 appearances for the River Cats, slashing .268/.344/.388 with five home runs, 43 RBI, and 12 stolen bases. On July 28, 2026, the Giants placed Casey Schmitt on the injured list with a left meniscus tear, and Basabe had his contract selected to the major league roster. On August 1, against the San Diego Padres, Basabe made his first start since the 2023 season, batting ninth and starting at second base. He was not originally slated to start, but entered the lineup after Luis Arraez was scratched before first pitch due to cramps. Basabe hit a two-run home run off Walker Buehler in the third inning and later hit a game-tying two-run double off Mason Miller in the eighth inning. He finished the game 2-for-4 with four RBI in the loss.

On November 2, he was sent outright off the 40-man roster and elected free agency.

== Personal life ==
Basabe's cousins, Luis Matos, Luis Alexander Basabe, and Luis Alejandro Basabe, have played in MLB.
