= Luis Matos (baseball, born 2002) =

Venezuelan baseball player (born 2002)

Free agent
- Center fielder
- Born: January 28, 2002 (age 24); Valera, Venezuela
- Bats: Right Throws: Right

MLB debut
- June 14, 2023, for the San Francisco Giants

MLB statistics (through 2026 season)
- Batting average: .230
- Home runs: 15
- Runs batted in: 61
- Stats at Baseball Reference

Teams
- San Francisco Giants (2023–2025); Milwaukee Brewers (2026)

Luis Eduardo Matos (born January 28, 2002) is a Venezuelan professional baseball center fielder who is a free agent. He signed with the San Francisco Giants as an international free agent in 2018, and made his Major League Baseball (MLB) debut in 2023.

== Early life ==
Matos was born in Valera, Venezuela, and was raised in the small town of Bobures, alongside Lake Maracaibo in Zulia State, Venezuela. His father (Jose), uncle (Malvin), and a number of his cousins (including Luis Alexander Basabe, Osleivis Basabe, and Luis Alejandro Basabe) have played baseball professionally.

== Career ==
=== San Francisco Giants ===
Matos signed with the San Francisco Giants as an international free agent on July 2, 2018 for a signing bonus of $725,000. He spent his first professional season in 2019 at 17 years of age with the Dominican Summer League Giants and Rookie-level Arizona League Giants, batting a combined .367/.438/.566 with 65 runs, seven home runs, 48 RBI, and 21 stolen bases in 24 attempts in 251 at-bats over 60 games. In the Dominican Summer League (DSL), Matos led the league with 24 doubles and batted .362(8th in the league)/.430/.570(9th) in 234 at-bats with 60 runs (3rd), seven home runs (7th), 47 RBI (3rd), and 12 hit by pitches (3rd). He was a DSL mid-season All Star, a DSL postseason All Star, and a Baseball America DSL All Star.

Matos did not play in a game in 2020 due to the cancellation of the minor league season because of the COVID-19 pandemic. He played the 2021 season with the Low-A San Jose Giants, as one of the youngest players in the league. Over 109 games, Matos led the California League with 84 runs, 86 RBI, 35 doubles, 21 stolen bases, and five sacrifice flies and slashed .313(7th in the league)/.359/.495(9th) in 451 at bats with 15 home runs (2nd), 28 walks (5th), and seven hit by pitches (3rd). He was the California League Most Valuable Player, a California League post-season All Star, and an MiLB Organization All Star.

In 2022, playing for the Rookie-level Arizona Complex League Giants (for only seven at-bats) and High–A Eugene Emeralds in the minor leagues, Matos batted an aggregate .215/.280/.356 in 376 at-bats with 58 runs, 12 home runs, and 47 RBI, while dealing with an injured quadriceps. With the Emeralds, he had the lowest strikeout rate among qualified hitters in the league. Matos then played for the Scottsdale Scorpions in the Arizona Fall League, batted .233/.280/.361 in 86 at bats, and was named Arizona Fall League Defensive Player of the Year. He was ranked # 2 in the Giants 2022 MLB Prospect Rankings. On November 15, 2022, the Giants added Matos to their 40-man roster to protect him from the Rule 5 draft.

Matos began the 2023 season with the Double–A Richmond Flying Squirrels, and batted .304/.399/.444 in 115 at-bats. He was then promoted to the Triple–A Sacramento River Cats, where he was 5.7 years younger than his fellow Pacific Coast League ballplayers, and batted .398(leading the league)/.435/.685(4th) in 108 at-bats with six steals in seven attempts, before he was called up on June 14, 2023, for his major league debut. At 21 years of age, Matos was the youngest player in Triple–A.

Matos was promoted after left fielder Mitch Haniger suffered fractured forearm in the previous night's game, and Matos was slotted in the lineup as the starting center fielder against the St. Louis Cardinals. On June 14, 2023, Matos batted second and went 1-for-3 with a run scored in his MLB debut. At 21 years of age, he became the second-youngest position player in MLB; only Cardinals outfielder Jordan Walker was younger. In 76 games during his rookie campaign, he batted .250/.319/.342 with two home runs and 14 RBI.

Matos was optioned to Triple–A Sacramento to begin the 2024 season. After being called up in mid-May, he drove in 17 runs in his first six starts, becoming the first Giant awarded National League Player of the Week since Brandon Belt in 2018. In 45 games for San Francisco, Matos slashed .213/.237/.347 with five home runs and 25 RBI.

Matos made 57 appearances for the Giants during the 2025 season, batting .221/.266/.424 with a career–high eight home runs, 22 RBI, and four stolen bases. On March 25, 2026, Matos was designated for assignment by San Francisco.

=== Milwaukee Brewers ===
On March 30, 2026, the Giants traded Matos to the Milwaukee Brewers in exchange for cash considerations. He played in nine games for Milwaukee, going 4-for-20 (.200) with one walk. On April 24, Matos was designated for assignment by the Brewers. He cleared waivers and was sent outright to the Triple-A Nashville Sounds on April 29. He elected free agency on November 2.
