= Luis Alejandro Basabe =

Venezuelan baseball player (born 1996)

Free agent
- Second baseman
- Born: August 26, 1996 (age 30); El Vigía, Mérida, Venezuela
- Bats: Switch Throws: Right
- Stats at Baseball Reference

Luis Alejandro Basabe (bah-sah'vay) (born August 26, 1996) is a Venezuelan professional baseball second baseman who is a free agent.

== Career ==
=== Boston Red Sox ===
In 2012, the Boston Red Sox made a pair of international signings that were unusual. The team signed identical twins from Venezuela, both named Luis Basabe, both switch-hitters who throw right-handed, both were around the same size and weight, and each of whom signed for a $450,000 bonus when they turned 16 on August 26. Relatively new to baseball, the Basabe twins started to play the game a short time before signing, as they spent most of their childhood playing soccer. Luis Alejandro is a middle infielder with plus speed, an advanced glove and limited power but outstanding feel to reach first base without the benefit of a base hit. He also has shown better ability to manipulate the bat head than his brother, Luis Alexander, a speedy center fielder with a strong arm who has raw power and potential to add strength. They debuted with the Dominican Summer League Red Sox in its 2013 season.

In his first season, Luis Alejandro appeared in 58 of the team's 70 games. He hit just .192 with one home run and 14 runs batted in (RBI), but compiled a .332 on-base percentage with 25 runs scored and nine stolen bases in 11 attempts. Basabe then was limited to 29 games in 2014 because of injury, and finished with a .222/.403/.273 slash line, 19 runs, and nine steals.

Once recovered from his injury, Basabe joined the Gulf Coast League Red Sox in 2015, dividing his playing time between second base and shortstop in only 28 games, as he was sidelined by another injury. Even so, Basabe improved his average to .260 and recorded a .387 OBP, while scoring 22 runs with six RBI, and eight steals.

In 2016, Basabe was moved up two levels and rejoined his sibling twin with the Greenville Drive, where Luis Alejandro had his breakthrough season. He was unstoppable out of the leadoff spot from that Spring, reaching base safely in 46 of his first 50 games, including 17 multi-hit contests, 38 runs, 18 RBI, and a club-high 13 stolen bases, all while posting a .311/.414/.463 line. Basabe was selected as utility infielder for the Southern Division team at the South Atlantic League All-Star Game.

=== Arizona Diamondbacks ===
On July 9, 2016, the Arizona Diamondbacks acquired Basabe and right-handed pitcher Jose Almonte from the Red Sox in exchange for relief pitcher Brad Ziegler. Basabe was assigned to the D-Backs’ farm team, the Kane County Cougars, and he finished the season there. In 109 total games between Greenville and Kane County, Basabe batted .272 with seven home runs and 38 RBI. He returned to Kane County in 2017 and played in 53 games, batting .229, with two home runs, and seven RBI. He missed the last three months of the season due to a knee injury that ultimately required surgery.

In 2018, Basabe split time between Kane County and the Visalia Rawhide, batting .249 with two home runs and 22 RBI in 90 games between the two clubs. He spent 2019 with Visalia, slashing .293/.402/.390 with four home runs, 51 RBI, and 16 stolen bases over 117 games. Basabe did not play in a game in 2020 due to the cancellation of the minor league season because of the COVID-19 pandemic.

Basabe spent the 2021 campaign with the Double-A Amarillo Sod Poodles, playing in 83 games and hitting .226/.299/.396 with 10 home runs, 32 RBI, and seven stolen bases. Basabe elected free agency following the season on November 7, 2021.

== Personal life ==
Two of Basabe's cousins (Osleivis Basabe and Luis Matos) currently play in Major League Baseball (MLB) for the San Francisco Giants and Milwaukee Brewers, respectively.
