= Devon Williams =

Devin or Devon Williams may refer to:

- Devin Williams (baseball) (born 1994), American professional baseball player
- Devin Williams (basketball) (born 1994), American professional basketball player
- Devon Williams (decathlete) (born 1994), American decathlete
- Devon Williams (footballer) (born 1992), Jamaican footballer
- Devon Williams (rugby union) (born 1992), South African rugby union player
- Devon Williams, a guitarist and vocalist for bands Lavender Diamond, Osker and Fingers Cut Megamachine
