= Luis Alexander Basabe =

Venezuelan baseball player (born 1996)

- Outfielder
- Born: August 26, 1996 (age 30); El Vigía, Mérida, Venezuela
- Batted: Both Threw: Right

MLB debut
- August 27, 2020, for the San Francisco Giants

Last MLB appearance
- September 22, 2020, for the San Francisco Giants

MLB statistics
- Batting average: .143
- Home runs: 2
- Runs batted in: 1
- Stats at Baseball Reference

Teams
- San Francisco Giants (2020)

Luis Alexander Basabe (bah-sah'vay) (born August 26, 1996) is a Venezuelan former professional baseball outfielder. He played in Major League Baseball (MLB) for the San Francisco Giants. Listed at 6' 0" (1.83 m), 160 lb. (73 k), he is a switch hitter and throws right handed. The Boston Red Sox signed Basabe as an international amateur free agent in 2012. He made his MLB debut in 2020.

== Career ==
=== Boston Red Sox ===
The Boston Red Sox signed Basabe as an international amateur free agent in 2012 out of Venezuela for $450,000, at the same time that they signed his twin brother, Luis Alejandro Basabe. Basabe gained attention from scouts due to his tool set at a young age, displaying plus speed, plus arm strength in center field, raw power, athleticism, plate discipline, and the ability to hit from both sides of the plate. From 2013–2015, the Basabes played together after signing in the Dominican Summer and Gulf Coast leagues. He finished the year with the Gulf Coast League Red Sox, hitting .248/.328/.324 in 32 games, before being promoted to the Lowell Spinners the next season.

Basabe hit .243/.340/.401 with 15 runs and 13 RBIs in 56 games for the Spinners in 2015, tying for third with teammate Andrew Benintendi in the short-season New York–Penn League with seven home runs despite being its third-youngest regular at age 18 in a league full of former college players. He showed speed on the basepaths as well, leading Lowell with 15 stolen bases. That was also good for 10th in the NYPL. Besides, he became the first player in Lowell's 20-year history to homer from both sides of the plate in one game, doing so in June and again in July, and also represented his team in the NYPL All-Star Game.

Basabe opened 2016 at Low-A Class Greenville Drive, where he showed his potential and rare combination of power and speed in 105 games. Though he scuffled in the first half, Basabe emerged in the second half and hit .298/.361/.502, including a .363 average in the month of July, to bring his season line to .261/.328/.451, hitting 8 triples (fourth in the South Atlantic League), 12 home runs, and stealing 25 bases (ninth in the league) while being caught only five times. In addition, he drove in 52 runs and scored 61 times. Furthermore, he was selected to the South Atlantic League post-season All-Star team, and a Baseball America Low Class A All Star.

After being promoted to the Salem Red Sox for the last week of the season and postseason, Basabe seemed to be fitting right into the High-A Class. In five games, he went 8-for-22 and slashed .364/.391/.545 with two doubles and one triple. Overall, he ranked fourth among the Sox minor leaguers in steals, sixth in homers, seventh in runs, eighth in triples (8), and tenth in hits (104) and doubles (24). He was eligible for selection in the Rule 5 draft in December.

=== Chicago White Sox ===
On December 6, 2016, Basabe was traded to the Chicago White Sox, along with Yoan Moncada, Michael Kopech, and Victor Diaz, for Chris Sale. He spent his first season in the White Sox organization with the High-A Winston-Salem Dash where he batted .221/.320/.320 with five home runs, 17 stolen bases (while being caught 6 times), and 36 RBIs.

The White Sox added Basabe to their 40-man roster after the 2017 season. He spent 2018 with Winston-Salem, with whom he was a mid-season Carolina League All Star, and the Double–A Birmingham Barons, slashing .258/.354/.445 with 15 home runs, 56 RBIs, and 16 stolen bases (while being caught 12 times) over 119 games. He was an All-Star Futures Game selection with Birmingham.

Basabe spent the majority of 2019 with Birmingham while also playing in five games with the Kannapolis Intimidators, batting .250/.331/.341 with three home runs and 10 stolen bases (while being caught five times) over 74 games between the two teams.

On August 4, 2020, Basabe was designated for assignment following the selection of Brady Lail to the 40-man roster.

=== San Francisco Giants ===
On August 9, Basabe was traded to the San Francisco Giants in exchange for cash considerations. On August 27, 2020, he was promoted to the major leagues for the first time and made his debut that day against the Los Angeles Dodgers.

On February 4, 2021, Basabe was designated for assignment by the Giants to open a 40-man roster spot for Tommy La Stella. On February 11, Basabe was outrighted to the Triple-A Sacramento River Cats.

=== Chicago White Sox (second stint) ===
On November 21, 2021, Basabe signed a minor league contract with the Chicago White Sox. He was assigned to the Triple-A Charlotte Knights to begin the 2022 season. After limping to an .080/.115/.160 slash with no home runs or RBI in 9 games for Charlotte, Basabe was released by the White Sox organization on May 3, 2022.

== Personal life ==
Two of Basabe's cousins, Osleivis Basabe and Luis Matos, have played in MLB.
